= Whitby Goth Weekend =

Music festival in North Yorkshire, England

- Whitby Goth Weekend logo and image of Whitby Abbey
- Genre: Gothic rock; dark wave; synth-pop; future pop; gothic metal; doom metal
- Dates: October/November (1994–present), April (1997–present)
- Venue: Whitby Spa 1997–2018, Metropole Hotel (overspill venue) 1999–2006, Abbey Wharf 2019–present
- Locations: Whitby, North Yorkshire, England
- Years active: 1994–present
- Founders: Jo Hampshire
- Website: whitbygothweekend.co.uk

Whitby Goth Weekend is a twice-yearly music festival for the goth subculture, in Whitby, North Yorkshire, England, organised by Jo Hampshire. The event is an alternative music festival, consisting of two nights of live bands, and three days (Friday, Saturday and Sunday) of alternative trade stalls at the Whitby Leisure Centre, and Whitby Brunswick Centre.

The term "Whitby Goth Weekend" is sometimes used as a generic term to describe events during the week in Whitby as a whole, although the name of the event and its associated logo are registered trademarks of Jo Hampshire of Top Mum Promotions.

== History ==
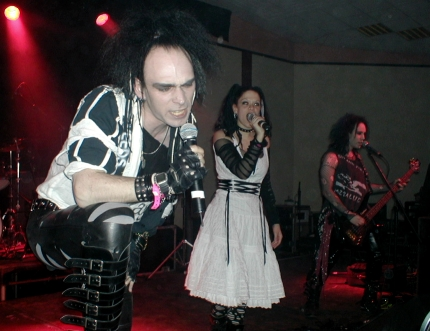
Screaming Banshee Aircrew on stage at Whitby Goth Weekend, April 2005

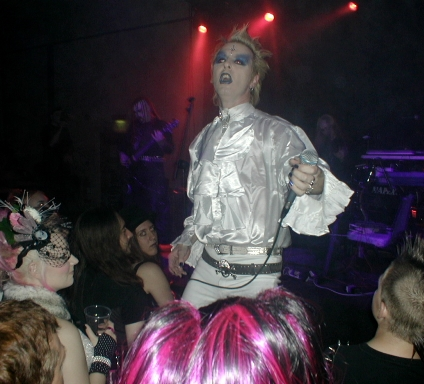
Uninvited Guest on stage at Whitby Goth Weekend, October 2006

The origins of WGW are in a meeting of around forty of Hampshire's pen-pals in 1994. The first meeting was held in the Elsinore public house in Whitby along with the Little Angel, which continues to be a meeting point during the weekend. Hampshire said Whitby was chosen for its Dracula connections, although probably more so because the connection had already fostered a sense of acceptance on the part of locals and businesses rather than any inherent romanticism regarding the location. Until 1997, the festival was held yearly, after which it became twice-yearly in April and October. It has since grown into one of the world's most popular goth music events with thousands of attendees from across the UK and beyond.

In the mid-2000s the October weekend on or near Halloween began to attract large numbers of non-goths in Halloween, horror, historical, fantasy and sci-fi costume, which led to an increase in photographers and visitors. The weekend now attracts other alternative subcultures, including Victorian vampires, rockers, punks and steampunks. Some regulars consider it no longer a purely "goth" weekend, and it was acknowledged by Hampshire in the 2014 Whitby Goth Weekend Guide that in order to survive the event would have to diversify into other areas that have influenced goth. In recent years the costumed attendees now outnumber the goth attendees. Whitby Goth Weekend is now not as relevant on the Goth scene as it was 10-15 years ago.

The October 2007 festival was dedicated to the memory of the murdered Goth Sophie Lancaster (who had attended three Whitby Goth Weekends) and a collection of more than £3,000 was raised from various events to fund a memorial bench to her in the town.

Newbies who have not attended the event before are referred to as "Whitby Virgins". To help introduce them to the event, there was a WGW Virgins Meet Up on the Friday morning at the Spa until about 2014.

In 2016, concerns were raised by locals about disrespect being shown to the graves in St. Mary's Churchyard by photographers using them for photographic purposes which has resulted in a petition to have the area closed during the event. The proposal was supported by Whitby Goth Weekend, saying that "behaviour displayed in the churchyard is disrespectful and offensive". In 2016 The Bram Stoker Film Festival, which also took place in the town, rehashed a proposal to build a film set graveyard which photographers would be charged to use.

In June 2018 there was a breakdown in the relationship between WGW and SIV Live, who operate the Spa. WGW was therefore unable to book the Spa for bands for October 2018. In July a new promoter was found to put bands on at the Spa in October. Subsequently, WGW announced a different set of 2019 dates to those announced by the Spa and the new promoter, with bands at Abbey Wharf, a large pub in Whitby.

== Economy ==
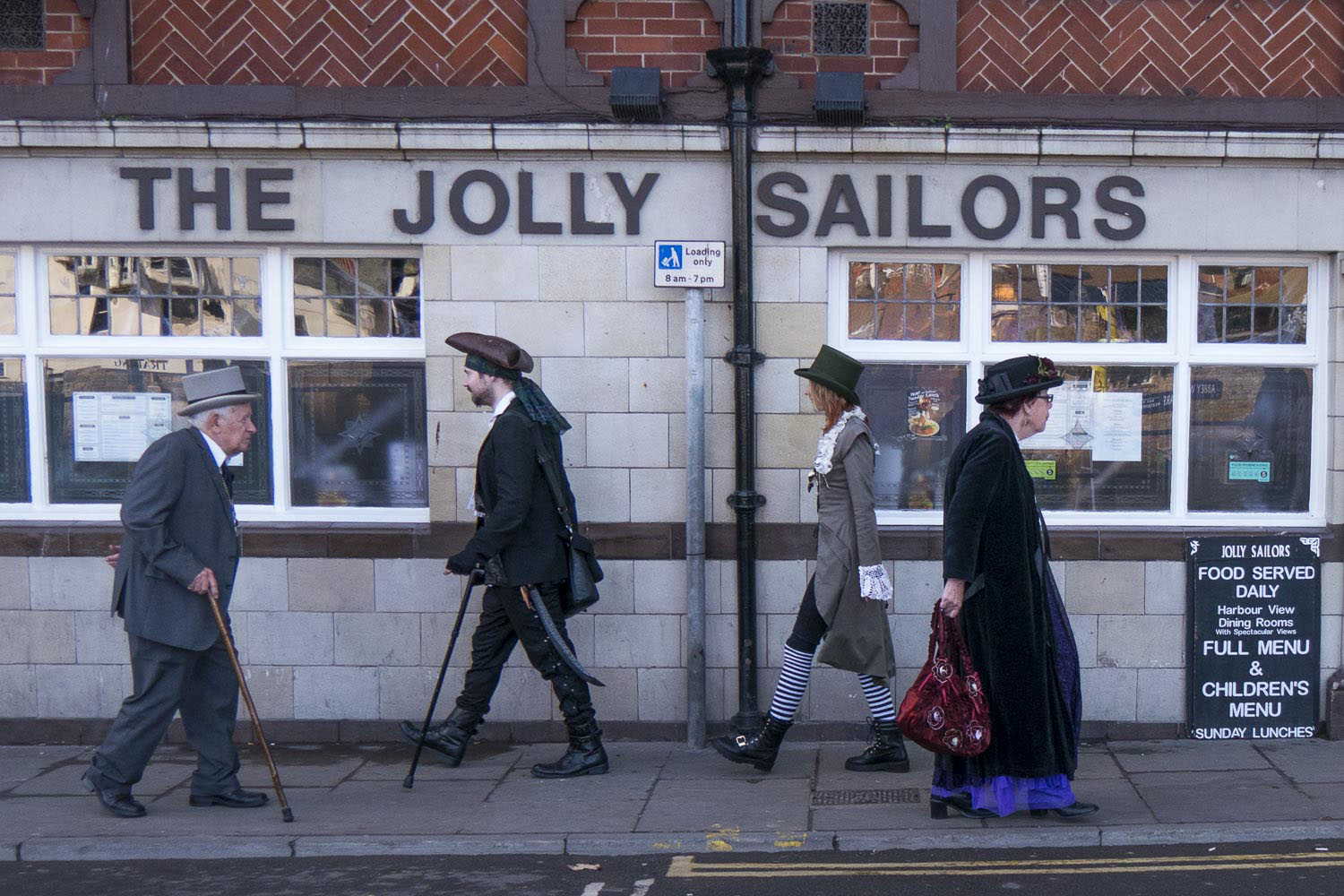
Visitors to Whitby in November 2016

The event results in business for the town in general, with attendees spending around 10,000 bed-nights in Whitby and the weekend contributing £1.1 million per annum to the local economy.

== Location and events ==
The "weekend" starts during the day on Friday and fringe events are held on Thursday, Sunday and Monday including club nights, markets, and a charity football match between visiting goth team Real Gothic, and local team Stokoemotiv Whitby. During the October/November event there is an independent custom car show, 'Whitby Kustom' in the grounds of West Cliff School. There are also several "meet ups" aimed at goths with a particular interest, e.g. Gothic Lolita.

The main event was held in the town's largest venue, the Whitby Pavilion (known as the Spa) and the Bizarre Bazaar 'Goth Market' is also held there and at Whitby Leisure Centre and the Brunswick Centre. Access to the Spa in the evening required a ticket and live bands played on both Friday and Saturday from 08:00 until about midnight. The Metropole was often used as an overspill venue for the Spa, with bands due to play the next evening/or playing from the previous evening. In recent years it has been used as a venue for the markets as well as the clubs, Manic Monday and Sexy Sunday. The Rifle Club, The Metropole and the Whitby Rowing Club hosting an official SOPHIE Lancaster Fundraising Event, Dark Souls and Monster Mash (Dead Skool Disco) are used for unofficial events.

For many years there was a 1980s music night held at Laughtons. The night would traditionally end with the song Vagabonds. In 2010 this venue became a Wetherspoons Hotel, but the lineal descendant of the 80's night continues to take place on the Sunday night.

=== Lineups ===
(*) indicates headline act for each night/event

Event #	Title	Date	Bands (split into nights where applicable)			
1	Whitby 1	2–4 September 1994	Friday: Manuskript*	Saturday: Inkubus Sukkubus*, 13 Candles, Nightmoves, All Living Fear		
2	Whitby 2	1–3 September 1995		Saturday: Children On Stun*, Shadowmaker, Suspiria, The Horatii, Manuskript		
3	Whitby 3	27–29 September 1996	The Marionettes*, Die Laughing, Midnight Configuration	London After Midnight*, Corpus Delicti		
4	Whitby 4	25–26 April 1997	Friday: James Ray's Gangwar*, Dream Disciples, Libitina	Saturday: Stun*, The Merry Thoughts, Judith	Sunday: Emma Conquest, Robed In Desire, The Tortured, Violet Times	
5	Whitby 4.5	31 October – 1 November 1997	Inkubus Sukkubus*, Manuskript, Psycho TV	Rosetta Stone*, The Horatii, Sunshine Blind		
6	Whitby 5	24–25 April 1998	Die Laughing*, Nekromantik	All Living Fear*, These Crimson Dreams, Isobels Shrine		
7	Whitby 5.5	30–31 October 1998	Sunshine Blind*, Funhouse, Nervosa, Dream Disciples (at overspill venue), Passion Play (at overspill venue)	Rosetta Stone*, Emma Conquest, Faithful Dawn, Sunshine Blind (at overspill venue), The Sisters Of Murphy (tribute act at overspill venue)		
8	Whitby 6	23–24 April 1999	Switchblade Symphony*, The Last Dance, Denyze & Ed Alleyne-Johnson	Manuskript*, This Burning Effigy, Star 80		
9	Whitby 6.5	5–6 November 1999	Dream Disciples*, Manuskript, Passion Play, The Breath Of Life (band) (at overspill venue), Sneaky Bat Machine (at overspill venue)	The Breath Of Life*, The Narcissus Pool, The Chaos Engine, Sneaky Bat Machine, Manuskript (at overspill venue), Dream Disciples (at overspill venue), The Chaos Engine (at overspill venue)		
10	Whitby 7	28–29 April 2000	Mesh*, Saints of Eden, The Chaos Engine	Sigue Sigue Sputnik*, VNV Nation, Putra-Chic		
11	Whitby 7.5	3–4 November 2000	Clan of Xymox*, Screaming Dead, Mist Of Avalon	Inkubus Sukkubus*, Emma Conquest		
12	Whitby 8	27–28 April 2001	Dream Disciples*, Attrition, Adfinem	Je$us Loves Amerika, The Last Days, Seize, The Faces Of Sarah		
13	Whitby 8.5	2–3 November 2001	Andi Sex Gang*, Sorrow	D.U.S.T., Finger Puppets, Swarf, Rome Burns, Cauda Pavonis		
14	WGW 9	26–27 April 2002	Paradise Lost*, Manuskript, Passion Play, Je$us Loves Amerika	Action Directe, Arkam Asylum, Little Match Girl, Synthetic		
15	WGW 9.5	1–2 November 2002	Last Rites*, The Narcissus Pool, Swarf	Beautiful Deadly Children, Ordinary Psycho, Season's End, Spermwhale		
16	WGW 10	11–12 April 2003	Belisha, deadfilmstar, Scary Bitches, The Ghost Of Lemora, Torsohorse	Red Lorry Yellow Lorry*, Spares, Synthetic, Psychophile		
17	WGW X	30 October – 1 November 2003	Thursday: Inkubus Sukkubus*, Faith and the Muse, DeathBoy	Friday: Wayne Hussey*, The Chaos Engine, All Living Fear	Saturday: Icon of Coil*, Sheep on Drugs, Goteki	Sunday: All About Eve*, Manuskript, Rose McDowall
18	WGW 11	23–24 April 2004	The Damned*, Earth Loop Recall, Zombina and the Skeletones	The Mission*, Dream Disciples, Libitina		
19	WGW 11.5	29–31 October 2004	Manuskript*, The Last Dance, Corrosion, Faetal	Zodiac Mindwarp and the Love Reaction*, Claytown Troupe, Beautiful Deadly Children, Torsohorse	Alien Sex Fiend*, Glass, Ovni	
20	WGW 12	22–23 April 2005	Gene Loves Jezebel*, Voltaire, Psychophile, Screaming Banshee Aircrew	In the Nursery*, QueenAdreena, Devilish Presley, Greenhaus		
21	WGW 12.5	28–29 October 2005	Doctor and the Medics*, NFD, DeathBoy, Katscan	Rico*, Mechanical Cabaret, The Modern, Neon Zoo		
22	WGW 13	21–22 April 2006	Manuskript*, Swarf, Misty Woods & GDM, History Of Guns	The Breath Of Life*, Frankenstein, Zombina and the Skeletones, Spares		
23	WGW 13.5	27–28 October 2006	The Damned*, Vampire Beach Babes, Trauma Pet, Xykogen	XPQ-21*, Katzenjammer Kabarett, Inertia, Uninvited Guest		
24	WGW 14	27–28 April 2007	The Last Dance*, Sohodolls, D.U.S.T., RazorBladeKisses	The Crüxshadows*, Bella Morte, Machine Gun Symphony, Rome Burns		
25	WGW 14.5	26–27 October 2007	The Cassandra Complex*, Crud, Ghost of Lemora, Voices of Masada	The Birthday Massacre*, Sins of the Flesh, All Living Fear, Pro-jekt		
26	WGW 15	26–27 April 2008	Star Industry*, Skeletal Family, Cauda Pavonis, Dyonisis	Clan of Xymox*, Mercurine, Screaming Banshee Aircrew, Snuff Radio		
27	WGW 15.5	31 October – 1 November 2008	Specimen*, Christian Death, Rezurex	Wayne Hussey*, Voltaire, The Beauty of Gemina		
28	WGW 16	24–26 April 2009	Abney Park*, The Last Dance, Zeitgeist Zero	Diary of Dreams*, The House of Usher, RazorBladeKisses		
29	WGW 16.5	30 October – 1 November 2009	The Eden House*, Zombina and the Skeletones, Grooving In Green	Faith and The Muse*, Adoration, Rhombus		
30	WGW 17	22–25 April 2010	Justin Sullivan*, Deviant UK, In Isolation	Anne-Marie Hurst*, Pretentious Moi?, Vendemmian		
31	WGW 17.5	29–31 October 2010	Wayne Hussey (with special guests Simon Hinkler, Miles Hunt and Erica Nockalls)*, Autumn Cannibals, The Last Cry	Manuskript*, The Stripper Project, Pro-jekt		
32	WGW 18	25–27 March 2011	Red Lorry Yellow Lorry*, Fuzzbox, Dr Arthur Krause, Black Moth, Dutch Order	The Damned*, Frankenstein, The Beauty Of Gemina, Luxury Stranger, Pink Hearse		
33	WGW 18.5	4–6 November 2011	Abney Park*, The Mist of Avalon, Devilish Presley, Cryogenica, Berlin Black	Chameleons vox*, Voltaire, Rhombus, The Dark Shadows, The Death Notes		
34	WGW 19	27–29 April 2012	In The Nursery*, Ugly Buggs, The Spiritual Bat, Last July	Gene Loves Jezebel*, Die Laughing, The Bellwether Syndicate, Red Sun Revival, Dead Eyes Opened		
35	WGW 19.5	2–4 November 2012	Mesh*, Fangs On Fur, Inertia, Dutch Order, Last July	Alien Sex Fiend*, Blitzkid, All Living Fear, The Last Cry, Bad Pollyanna		
36	WGW 20	26–28 April 2013	Voltaire*, Doctor and the Medics, Zombina and the Skeletones, Pussycat and the Dirty Johnsons	Clan Of Xymox*, Skeletal Family, The Danse Society, Deviant UK, William Control		
37	WGW 20.5	1–3 November 2013	William Control*, Fearless Vampire Killers, Ashestoangels, Bad Pollyanna	Diary Of Dreams*, Bella Morte, Rabia Sorda, Method Cell		
38	WGW 21	25–27 April 2014	Toyah*, Vince Ray & The Boneshakers, Cold In Berlin, Alexa De Strange	New Model Army*, The Last Cry, UK Decay, Jordan Reyne		
39	WGW 21.5	31 October – 2 November 2014	Heaven 17*, Visage, Deviant UK, Black Volition	Voltaire*, Hugh Cornwell, Rhombus, Bad Pollyanna, Lesbian Bed Death		
40	WGW 22	23–26 April 2015	Thursday: The Birthday Massacre*, Abney Park*, The Red Paintings, Ashestoangels	Friday: The Crüxshadows*, Bella Morte*, Sigue Sigue Sputnik Electronic, The Last Dance	Saturday: Sex Gang Children*, Andi Sex Gang*, The Chameleons Vox*, Manuskript, Jordan Reyne	Sunday: The Damned*, William Control*, Doctor And The Medics, Pussycat And The Dirty Johnsons
41	WGW 22.5	30 October – 1 November 2015	Altered Images*, Fearless Vampire Killers, Bad Pollyanna, Chasing Dragons	Spear of Destiny*, The Last Cry, Vince Ripper and the Rodent Show, In Isolation		
42	WGW 23	22–24 April 2016	Therapy?*, The Red Paintings, Lene Lovich, Hands Off Gretel	Wayne Hussey*, Fuzzbox, Rhombus, She Made Me Do It		
43	WGW 23.5	4–6 November 2016	Heaven 17*, Sigue Sigue Sputnik Electronic, Manuskript, Kitty in a Casket	The Mission*, Skeletal Family, Children On Stun, Chasing Dragons		
44	WGW 24	21–23 April 2017	Toyah*, Bad Pollyanna, Deviant UK, Healthy Junkies	Voltaire*, Abney Park*, The Men That Will Not Be Blamed For Nothing, Magic Eight Ball		
45	WGW 24.5	27–28 October 2017	Theatre of Hate*, The Membranes, Hands Off Gretel, Pussycat and the Johnsons	The Birthday Massacre*, Fuzzbox (cancelled), Vince Ripper and the Rodent Show, Massive Ego		
46	WGW 25	27–29 April 2018	Dr Haze's Circus of Horrors, Desmond O'Connor, Rayguns Look Real Enough	Aurelio Voltaire, The Last Cry, Sigue Sigue Sputnik Electronica, 1919		
47	WGW 25.5	25–28 October 2018	Thursday @ Abbey Wharf: As Sirens Fall	Saturday @ Abbey Wharf: Soraya Vivian, Dead Ringers		
48	WGW 26	11–14 April 2019	Thursday @ Abbey Wharf: Chasing Dragons	Saturday @ Abbey Wharf: David Live (David Bowie tribute)		

== See also ==
- List of gothic festivals
- List of industrial music festivals
- List of electronic music festivals

== Bibliography ==
- Waters, Colin (2009). Gothic Whitby. History Press. ISBN 978-0-7524-5291-3.
