= The Black Bible =

Compilation album by Various artists
- Released: October 13, 1998
- Genre: Industrial; EBM; gothic rock
- Length: 269:21
- Label: Cleopatra

The Black Bible is a various artists compilation album released on October 13, 1998 by Cleopatra Records.

== Reception ==
Professional ratings
Review scores
Source	Rating
AllMusic	1.5/5 stars

Keith Farley of AllMusic credits The Black Bible for starting well but criticizes it for stagnating once the second disc starts and presenting "more than 30 tracks of middling-to-downright-obnoxious industrial music."

== Track listing ==
Disc one: The Old Testament
No.	Title	Writer(s)	Artist	Length
1.	"In the Flat Field"	Daniel Ash; David Haskins; Kevin Haskins; Peter Murphy	Bauhaus	4:46
2.	"Blacklist"	Edward Ka-Spel; Phil Knight; Patrick Wright	The Legendary Pink Dots	6:43
3.	"Dead Heaven"	Gary Numan	Gary Numan	5:22
4.	"Everyday Is Halloween"	Al Jourgensen	Ministry	6:25
5.	"Laura"	Carl McCoy; Gary Wisker; Paul Wright; Nod Wright	Fields of the Nephilim	3:53
6.	"Pagan Lovesong"	Mary D'Nellon; Dik Evans; Gavin Friday; Derek Rowen; Trevor Rowan	Virgin Prunes	3:46
7.	"Christian Says"	Daniel Ash; Glenn Campling; Kevin Haskins	Tones on Tail	3:42
8.	"Jipp"	Chris Reed	Red Lorry Yellow Lorry	2:57
9.	"Rosary"	John Aston; Michael Aston; Ian Hudson; Albie DeLuca; Julianne Regan; Steve Marshall	Gene Loves Jezebel	5:49
10.	"Holes"	Chris Bell; Tim Huthert; Jon Klein; Johnny Melton; Kevin Mills; Jonathon Trevisick; Oliver Wisdom	Specimen	4:40
11.	"She's a Killer"	Johnnie Freshwater; David James; Christine Wade; Nicholas Wade	Alien Sex Fiend	6:42
12.	"Kagami"	Philippe Fichot	Die Form	3:52
13.	"Supernaut" (Black Sabbath cover)	Geezer Butler; Tony Iommi; Ozzy Osbourne; Bill Ward	1000 Homo DJs	6:39
14.	"Fatherland" (Sisters of Mercy Mix)	Jürgen Engler; Chris Lietz	Die Krupps	4:37
15.	"V's Theme (Outro)"	Haskins	David J	1:52

Disc two: The New Testament
No.	Title	Writer(s)	Artist	Length
1.	"Somnolent"	Rhys Fulber; Bill Leeb	Delerium	4:35
2.	"Drool (Mother)"	Tina Root; Susan Wallace	Switchblade Symphony	5:10
3.	"Allegedly, Dancefloor Tragedy"	Matthew Carl Lucian; Mark Tansley	Suspiria	4:38
4.	"An Exit"	Matt Green; Athan Maroulis; Eric Powell	Spahn Ranch	4:14
5.	"Adrenaline"	Karl North; Porl King	Rosetta Stone	3:42
6.	"Love and Solitude"	John Clare; Love Is Colder Than Death	Love Is Colder Than Death	3:49
7.	"Torturous"	Damien DeVille; Dominic LaVey; Dante Savarelle	Nosferatu	4:35
8.	"Eyelash"	David Block; Deborah Denton; Dr. Ruth; Paul Sadler	Big Electric Cat	4:47
9.	"The Lake"	Christophe Baudrion; Sébastien Pietrapiana; Laurence Romanini; Jérôme Schmitt	Corpus Delicti	3:01
10.	"Irresistible"	Timo Väänänen; Jyrki Witch	Two Witches	4:37
11.	"Angel"	Rudolf Ratzinger	wumpscut:	4:24
12.	"4 Walls Black"	Chuck Lenihan; Vincent Saletto; David Vincent; Gen Vincent	Genitorturers	3:28
13.	"Clownhead"	Mark S. Walsh	The New Creatures	5:30
14.	"Psychocult"	Marvin Arkham	The Merry Thoughts	4:47
15.	"Invocation (Salome's Dream)"	John Berry; Rachel Speight	Die Laughing	3:22
16.	"Malvasia"	Janis Kalifatidis; Jens Gellner; Mario Lang; Gen Vincent; Markus Wymetalik	Into the Abyss	6:01
17.	"Serenade for the Dead"	Claus Larsen	Leæther Strip	3:56

Disc three: The New Revelations
No.	Title	Writer(s)	Artist	Length
1.	"Waves (Take Me Alive)"	Jim Field; Sue Hutton	Rhea's Obsession	4:44
2.	"Wake Up"	Olaf Lupp; Christian Lehmann; Peter Wizki; Andreas Menge	Crimson Joy	2:57
3.	"Odio en el Alma"	Rasco Agroyam; Erk Aicrag	Hocico	6:12
4.	"Write My Name in Blood"	Chris Bradshaw; Sean Beavan; Mick Cripps; Charlie Clouser	Burning Retna	3:32
5.	"Subversion III"	Chris McCarter; Dino Molinaro	Ikon	4:22
6.	"Seasoned"	David Cerequas; Sheena Colbath; Karl Schulz	Numeralia	3:27
7.	"Untitled"	Santeria	Santeria	2:20
8.	"Birth"	Joe Rolland	Gravedance	3:26
9.	"The Shepherds Deathline" (Leæther Strip Mix)	Benoît Blanchart; Séba Dolimont	Aïboforcen	5:10
10.	"Chains"	Cook; Kai	Strap on Halo	3:46
11.	"Monsters"	Tim Curry; Virgil DuPont; Sean Flanagan	The Crüxshadows	4:48
12.	"100 Crimes"	Brian Castillo; Eamon Collier; Anne Hadlock; Jeremy Lightfoot; Gordan Raphael; Josh Recap	Absinthee	4:04
13.	"Desperado"	Haruhiko Ash; Siva	Eve of Destiny	4:32
14.	"Scar Tissue"	Adam Christian	Adam Christian	3:43
15.	"You Can Never Cut Your Hair"	Askelon Sain	Trance to the Sun	4:07
16.	"Infusion"	Mark Andrews; Shelly Stewart; Static	Lucifer Scale	3:54
17.	"One Mind"	Anders Odden; Vilde Lockert	Magenta	3:31

Disc four: The Apocrypha
No.	Title	Writer(s)	Artist	Length
1.	"Halloween Theme" (John Carpenter cover)	John Carpenter	The Electric Hellfire Club	2:31
2.	"Transylvanian Concubine" (The Marilyn Manson Mix)	Melora Creager	Rasputina	2:54
3.	"Black Light District"	Boyd Rice	Boyd Rice	1:42
4.	"Writhing"	Paul Barker; Roland Barker; William Rieflin; Erich Werner	The Blackouts	3:39
5.	"Chain"	Daniel Vahnke	Vampire Rodents	2:55
6.	"Annabell Lee"	Giovanni Pagliari; Francesca Nicoli; Vittorio Vandelli	Ataraxia	2:41
7.	"Suicide"	Daniel C; Robert Brothers; Troy Payne; James Tramel; Richard Witherspoon	The Wake	4:38
8.	"A Flock of Birds"	Chako Hattori	Chako	2:55
9.	"This Mirage"	Eric Westfall; Rozz Williams	Christian Death	2:23
10.	"The Hop"	Kirk Brandon; Jim Walker; Jon Werner; Simon Werner	Theatre of Hate	2:47
11.	"Party Time"	Don Bolles; Paul Cutler	45 Grave	3:29
12.	"Cathedral in Ice"	Pete Lisa; Athan Maroulis; Ed Salek; Shelly Stewart	Fahrenheit 451	3:31
13.	"This Garden of Mine"	De Coy; Daniel Kleczyński; Leszek Rakowski	Fading Colours	8:40
14.	"1969" (The Stooges cover)	Dave Alexander; Iggy Pop; Ron Asheton; Scott Asheton	The Stooges	2:58
15.	"Cinerarium Waltz"	Eerie Von; Mike Morance	Eerie Von & Mike Morance	3:28
16.	"Interview"	Siouxsie Sioux	Siouxsie Sioux	0:43
17.	"Interview"	Robert Smith	Robert Smith	2:28

== Personnel ==
Adapted from The Black Bible liner notes.

- Athan Maroulis – compiling
- Brian Perera – compiling

== Release history ==
Region	Date	Label	Format	Catalog
United States	1998	Cleopatra	CD	CLP-0387
