= This Is Goth! =

Compilation album by Various artists
- Released: May 30, 2000
- Genre: Gothic rock; industrial
- Length: 160:58
- Label: Cleopatra

This Is Goth! is a various artists compilation album released on May 30, 2000, by Cleopatra Records.

== Reception ==
Professional ratings
Review scores
Source	Rating
AllMusic	3/5 stars

MacKenzie Wilson of AllMusic said "This Is Goth is one of Cleopatra's many goth-rock/darkwave compilations, another look at the forerunners of the eclectic musical genre and those pushing the brooding art into the new millennium."

== Track listing ==
Disc one
No.	Title	Writer(s)	Artist	Length
1.	"Ignore the Machine" (Electrode Mix)	Johnnie Freshwater; David James; Christine Wade; Nicholas Wade	Alien Sex Fiend	5:07
2.	"Spellbound" (Siouxsie & The Banshees cover)	Susan Ballion; Peter Edward Clarke; John McGeoch; Steven Severin	Inkubus Sukkubus	4:15
3.	"Firedance"	John Berry; Rachel Speight	Die Laughing	5:50
4.	"Always a Flame" (Leæther Strip Remix)	Jay Aston; Michael Aston; Ian Hudson; Rachel Speight	Gene Loves Jezebel	5:00
5.	"Haunting Picture"	Franck Amendola; Christophe Baudrion; Sébastien Pietrapiana; Laurence Romanini	Corpus Delicti	3:43
6.	"Oh My Goth!"	Romell Regulacion	Razed in Black	5:45
7.	"Now Is the Time"	Paul Lemos; Chris Moriarty; Joe Papa	Controlled Bleeding	3:44
8.	"Christabel"	David Block; Deborah Denton; Dr. Ruth; Paul Sadler	Big Electric Cat	6:00
9.	"Thalia"	Barry Galvin	Mephisto Walz	6:53
10.	"Alice" (The Sisters of Mercy cover)	Andrew Eldritch	The Prophetess	3:44
11.	"Permanent Red"	Bob Davidson; Ivan Hart; Robert Hyman; Brian Naughton; Jim Retterer	Usherhouse	3:30
12.	"Agony"	Timo Väänänen; Jyrki Witch	Two Witches	2:18

Disc two
No.	Title	Writer(s)	Artist	Length
1.	"Butterfly on a Wheel"	Craig Adams; Mick Brown; Simon Hinkler; Wayne Hussey	The Mission UK	5:20
2.	"Witches"	Tina Root; Susan Wallace	Switchblade Symphony	4:18
3.	"Shadow of Love"	Roman Jugg; Bryn Merrick; Christopher John Millar; Dave Vanian	The Damned; Roman Jugg	4:02
4.	"Futurist Unlimited"	Matt Green; Athan Maroulis	Spahn Ranch	4:28
5.	"Nazarene"	Daniel C; Robert Brothers; Troy Payne; James Tramel; Richard Witherspoon	The Wake	3:45
6.	"Allurance"	Rhys Fulber; Bill Leeb	Delerium	4:21
7.	"Pagan Love Song"	Mary D'Nellon; Dik Evans; Gavin Friday; Derek Rowen; Trevor Rowan	Virgin Prunes	4:07
8.	"Diamonds Are a Girl's Best Friend" (Carol Channing cover)	Leo Robin; Jule Styne	Rosetta Stone vs. Marilyn Monroe	3:52
9.	"Walking on Your Hand"	Chris Reed	Red Lorry Yellow Lorry	2:40
10.	"Snake Dance"	Tom Ashton; Simon Denbigh; Loz Elliott	The March Violets	4:09
11.	"Vague Inklings"	Oliver Henkel; Tatrin Mallon	Edera	4:21
12.	"Non-Union"	Chuck Collison; Rozz Williams	Premature Ejaculation	13:27

Disc three
No.	Title	Writer(s)	Artist	Length
1.	"Down in the Park" (20th Anniversary Edition)	Gary Numan	Gary Numan	5:15
2.	"Gone to Hell"	Ronny Baleo; Richard Frost; Rev. Dr. Luv; Thomas Thorn	The Electric Hellfire Club	3:06
3.	"Assassin Soul"	Matthew Carl Lucian; Mark Tansley	Suspiria	4:16
4.	"11:11"	Warren Mansfield	Screams for Tina	3:37
5.	"Spiritual Cramp"	Rozz Williams	Christian Death	2:17
6.	"Schubert Trio in E-flat" (Franz Schubert cover)	Franz Schubert	Vampire Rodents	2:28
7.	"A Heavenly Melancholy"	Gitane Demone; Pieter Rekvelt; Edward Smidt	Gitane Demone	5:26
8.	"Sin City" (KMFDM Remix)	Chuck Lenihan; Vincent Saletto; David Vincent; Gen Vincent	Genitorturers	4:34
9.	"Specimen"	Chris Bell; Tim Huthert; Jon Klein; Johnny Melton; Kevin Mills; Jonathon Trevisick; Johnny Melton; Oliver Wisdom	Specimen	3:20
10.	"Freemasons of Enochian Magick" (Front Line Assembly Remix)	Jason Hubbard; Dee Madden; Andy Shaw; Chris Shinkus	Penal Colony	6:19
11.	"Hollow"	Neil Ash; Pete Finnemore; Simon Manning	Children on Stun	3:09
12.	"Memories & Discontent"	D. A. Sebasstian	Kill Switch...Klick	2:32

== Personnel ==
Adapted from the This Is Goth! liner notes.

== Release history ==
Region	Date	Label	Format	Catalog
United States	2000	Cleopatra	CD	CLP 0845
