= Grooving in Green =

British gothic rock band

Grooving In Green
- Also known as: GIG
- Origin: United Kingdom
- Genres: Gothic rock; Post-punk; Darkwave
- Years active: 2008–present
- Labels: Inquisition Records; afmusic
- Members: General Megatron Bison; Pete Finnemore; Switchblade Switch; Simon Rippin
- Past members: Simon Manning; Joffie Lovett; Thomas T Cat
- Website: groovingingreen.co.uk

Grooving In Green is a British gothic rock band formed in 2008 by guitarists Pete Finnemore and Simon Manning in Hastings, England, joined by vocalist and lyricist General Megatron Bison later in the year.

In 2009, Grooving In Green released two EPs, Ascent EP and Dirt, on the independent record label Inquisition Records, catching the attention of producer Stephen Carey (The Eden House), which led to Grooving In Green releasing its debut album Post Traumatic Stress in 2010 and the follow-up album Stranglehold in 2012.

Following the departure of founding member Manning, the band went through various lineup changes before stabilising for its third album A Second Chance... in 2019.

Grooving In Green is currently working on its fourth album.

== History ==
=== 2008–2009: Early years ===
Grooving In Green formed in 2008, when guitarist Pete Finnemore and Simon Manning decided to write music together for the first time since Children on Stun's 1994 album, Tourniquets Of Loves Desire. Just like with Children on Stun, the pair once again took their name from a song by The March Violets. Later that year, General Megatron Bison, whom had left Northern Irish band Solemn Novena the previous year, completed the line-up after successfully auditioning with the Children on Stun song "Cats Or Devil's Eyes".

By January 2009, Finnemore and Manning had written "five or so" instrumental demos, four of which were selected for an EP and then sent to Bison for lyrics. In March, the trio assembled in engineer and producer Stuart Harper's Two Ways Sound Studio in Battle, East Sussex to record four songs for their debut EP. A week after the recording session, the band were asked to contribute a song to a German compilation that was being prepared, so the band returned to the studio to record a cover of "Cats Or Devil's Eyes", which was added to the EP as a hidden track. The EP, titled Ascent EP, was ready for sale by the time of GIG's first gig – which was in Leeds, June 2009.

In October 2009, the band returned to Two Ways Sound Studio to record a second EP in time for their appearance at Whitby Goth Weekend that same month. Four tracks were originally planned for the release but due to time issues and a drum track going missing, GIG had to shelve the planned studio recording of the demo Escape Myself. The three remaining tracks were released as the Dirt EP.

=== 2010–2011: Post Traumatic Stress ===
In early 2010, GIG travelled to Stanton Manor Studios in Hertfordshire to record its debut studio album, Post Traumatic Stress, which was produced by Stephen Carey. Carey provided additional guitars on the title track, "Post Traumatic Stress", as well as on the track, "Escape Myself". The album was mastered by Andy Jackson, best known for his work with the British progressive rock band Pink Floyd.

Post Traumatic Stress was released on 8 October 2010 by Inquisition Records. The album was well received by critics, with music writer Mick Mercer stating that the album was "a cool collection, with plenty of musically combustible uppity carousing you can’t fail to enjoy". Dominion Magazine, the Goth offshoot of Terrorizer Magazine, placed the album at #15 in their Top 20 Albums of 2010, with reviewer Piers Sixx calling it “a proper goth record, in the traditional sense", adding that there are "melodies to swoon to, vocals to please the ear and that nasty/nice guitar sound that made Children on Stun such a great band. A must have”. Russia's Gothic Rock placed the album at #5 in their Top 8 of 2010, describing the album as "brilliant and full of fun".

The front cover features artwork by graphic artist John D'Anter depicting the band members outside the gates of Bedlam psychiatric hospital and asylum surrounded by various people and creatures including lunatics, masked figures and a plague doctor.

To promote the album, GIG embarked on a tour of the UK followed by a headline slot at Helldorado festival 2011 in Norway. During the tour, new material was debuted that would ultimately feature on the next album.

On 29 August 2011, the band signed to Independent label Glory & Honour Records.

=== 2012–2013: Stranglehold and hiatus ===
Writing for a new studio album continued in early 2012 as GIG toured Europe, entering the studio in March. Stephen Carey returned as producer with Andy Jackson again handling mastering duties. Due to Glory & Honour Records mishandling the release of Stranglehold by printing the incorrect artwork resulting in nearly all of the copies having to be destroyed, German label afmusic picked up the worldwide release and distribution.

The artwork for the album was created by Finnemore based on an image of the Aztec sun stone housed in the National Museum of Anthropology, Mexico.

The album was met with generally favourable reviews, the review website I DIE:YOU DIE said the band "made enough subtle modernizations to their sound to make their sophomore LP feel like a solid step forward, rather than a retreat into nostalgic conservatism".

On 2 December 2012, it was announced that Simon Manning would be leaving the band with immediate effect. The reason being he felt "he cannot commit fully due to distance and he also wants to put everything into his personal life". Two months later, Joffie Lovett was announced as Manning's replacement for the Emergency Exit Festival in Austria.

Grooving In Green entered hiatus on 30 March 2013 due to a number reasons. Finnemore and Lovett were relocated to Brighton to focus on becoming a "tighter, better unit" and advertised that they were looking for new members to join the trio. The break granted the opportunity to continue writing music and to rework the live set, removing all Children on Stun songs that had until then been a staple of a GIG show, as it had been decided that the time had come for Grooving In Green to become its own entity.

=== 2014–2017: Line-up changes and Rebirth EP ===
The hiatus ended in March 2014 when Lovett revealed that Grooving In Green had expanded to a five-piece, with drummer Thomas Watson-Lightfoot (The Marionettes) and Italian bassist Eleonora Rossi, better known by their stage names Thomas T Cat and Switchblade Switch respectively, joining the line-up. Shortly after the official announcement of the two new members on 21 April, Lovett departed the band.

In November 2014, GIG returned to Stanton Manor Studios to record a new EP with Producer Stephen Carey playing guitar. The EP, titled Rebirth EP and released on 1 June 2015 via Bandcamp, contained four remixed and re-imagined tracks from the first two studio albums. Twelve days after the release of Rebirth EP, Watson-Lightfoot died.

The band made their live return in September at Sacrosanct Festival 2015 with The Eden House members Stephen Carey, providing guitars, and Simon Rippin on drums. In 2016, the line-up stabilised with Bison on vocals, Finnemore on guitars, Rossi on bass and Rippin on drums, playing their first gig at Death Disco in Greece followed by dates in Belgium and Germany.

In October 2017, the band undertook a tour of Poland with bands including Theatre of Hate and Jordan Rayne, debuting new material. This tour led to the band being featured on Polish TV. Returning from Poland, GIG co-headlined the Absinthe Music Festival in Whitby with Utah Saints.

=== 2018–2019: A Second Chance... ===
Grooving In Green, with drummer Simon Rippin producing, entered the studio in mid-January to record their third studio album, A Second Chance..., with recording completed by mid-February. The first single, Post Truth 66.6FM, was released via Bandcamp on 3 May 2018. The song was remixed and produced by Roni Pimpsin and differed from the version that would appear on the album.

A Little Soul, the second single from the album, was released on 11 November 2018 along with a music video filmed at Newhaven Fort, East Sussex.

In early 2019, GIG supported Frank the Baptist on their tour of the UK, followed by a triple bill co-headlining tour with Cold In Berlin and the band of All About Eve bassist Andy Cousin and Skeletal Family vocalist Anne Marie Hurst, Killing Eve.

June 2019 marked Grooving In Green's 10th anniversary, with the band releasing their third album A Second Chance... via Bandcamp on 21 June 2019. The front cover was illustrated by artist and vocalist Louise Crane and depicts a gothic take on the Three wise monkeys proverb. Class Of Sounds listed the album at #9 of its Top 10 albums of the year.

Grooving In Green were announced as one of the bands to play the inaugural Hard Rock Hell Goth in 2020 and also featured in the Summer 2019 edition of the American publication World Of Goth Magazine.

On Hallowe'en 2019, GIG continued to mark its 10th anniversary with the release of a free new single, Warning Signs, featuring a new song and two re-recordings of older songs.

The band ended the year with a gig supporting The Nosferatu at The Underworld Camden.

== Band members ==
Current members

- General Megatron Bison – lead vocals (2008–present)
- Pete Finnemore – guitars (2008–present)
- Eleonora Rossi (Switchblade Switch) – bass (2014–present)
- Simon Rippin – drums (2015–present)

Touring musicians

- Stephen Carey – guitars (2015)
- Andy Cousin – bass (2020)

Former members

- Simon Manning – guitars, bass (2008–2012)
- Joffie Lovett – guitars (2013)
- Thomas T Cat – drums (2014–2015)

== Discography ==
=== Studio albums ===
Year	Album details
2010	Post Traumatic Stress: Released: 8 October 2010; Label: Inquisition Records; Format: CD, digital
2012	Stranglehold: Released: 4 October 2012; Label: Glory & Honour Records, afmusic (Germany); Formats: CD, digital
2019	A Second Chance...: Released: 21 June 2019; Label: Self-Released; Format: CD, digital

=== Extended Plays and singles ===
Year	Title	Format	Track listing	Label	Cat #
2009	"Ascent EP"	CD, digital	Premonition • Scene Whore • Descent • Choices (Mk.II) • Cats Or Devil's Eyes (GIG Mix)	Inquisition Records	Crimp002
2009	"Dirt"	CD, digital	Drowning Without You • Dirt • Nothing	Inquisition Records	Crimp003
2015	"Rebirth EP"	digital	9th Circle • Escape Myself • Stranglehold • Some Kind Of Saviour	Self-Released	n/a
2018	"Post Truth 66.6FM"	digital	Post Truth (The Fake Mix 66.6FM)	Self-Released	n/a
2018	"A Little Soul"	digital	A Little Soul • A Little Soul (Alotta Narcotta Mix) • Post Truth (Alternative Facts Mix)	Self-Released	n/a
2019	"Warning Signs"	digital	Warning Signs • Drowning Without You (Redux) • Premonition (Redux)	Self-Released	n/a

=== Music videos ===
Year	Title	Album
2015	"Ninth Circle"	Rebirth EP
2018	"Post Truth 66.6FM (The Fake Mix)"	Post Truth 66.6FM
2018	"A Little Soul"	A Second Chance...
