= Screaming Banshee Aircrew =

English rock band

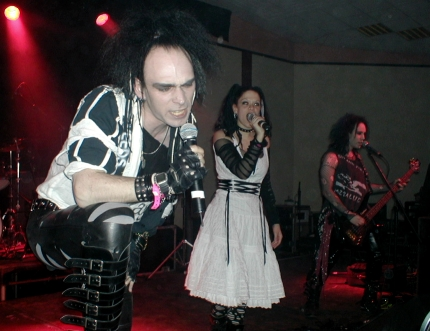
- Screaming Banshee Aircrew on stage at Whitby Goth Weekend, April 2005

Background information
- Origin: York, England
- Genres: Post-punk; alternative rock; gothic rock
- Years active: 2001–2010
- Past members: Chris Banshee; Mister Ed; Nix-Mix; Vix Hun; Jo Violet; Neal Unreal; Donnie Blue; Tina Smash; Tori Pink
- Website: www.bansheeaircrew.com

Screaming Banshee Aircrew were an English rock band originating from York. Formed in 2001, their varied music appealed to the gothic scene, and their energetic performances attracted a significant following across the UK. During their career, they released three full-length albums, Fishnet Messiah (2004), When All Is Said And Done (2007), and Sugar (2010), on the Resurrection Records label. The band was a frequent fixture at major festivals such as Whitby Gothic Weekend and toured with notable acts like The Birthday Massacre before disbanding in July 2010.

== Formation ==
Formed in April 2001 by Nick Daniel and Ed Tuke, starting out as a four-piece alternative/deathrock/post-punk band, they made their debut performance featuring a mixture of their own material and Rocky Horror covers on 16 November 2001 at The Winning Post, York for the Deviation clubnight. Their initial sound varied from tongue in cheek humour and rockabilly to sombre ballads and dancefloor stompers, influences include bands such as The March Violets, The Horatii, The Cramps, The Cure, Bauhaus, David Bowie and New Model Army.

The band quickly gained a reputation as an energetic live act and were to gather a fanbase across the UK, especially within the Gothic Rock circuit (see Goth subculture), during this time with an act that featured DAT tape backing, guitars and interwoven male and female lead vocals.

== Early releases ==
Self-released material during this period include the No Camping EP (2001) and Titanic Verses (2003), followed in the same year by a compilation album Titanic Verses – Now With Extra Wreckage. Titanic Verses was to receive a favourable review in the Summer 2003 issue of Meltdown Magazine and the band appeared in a two-page spread interview for Bubblegum Slut Fanzine following their first South of England show at Insanitorium in Colchester that year.

After their second appearance in London, the band was signed to the Resurrection Records label in early 2004. As a result of this, the album Fishnet Messiah was released worldwide on the Resurrection Records label in October 2004 with the album launch show taking place at the Camden Underworld along with fellow label-mates The Ghost Of Lemora and The Scary Bitches. SBA toured throughout the UK including festival appearances at Dark City (Edinburgh), Whitby Gothic Weekend, Carnival of Souls, Morecambe Goth Festival, Misery Of Sound, Malediction Festival (Reading), Gotham Festival (Islington Academy), Gotherham Festival, Symphony In Black and the Beyond The Veil Festival (Leeds) where they were interviewed by East Leeds Radio.

== Gothic scene popularity ==
Hello Mr Hyde, a track from the new Fishnet Messiah album was regularly making the playlist of Natasha's Batcave on Total Rock Radio, broadcasting weekly on both streaming internet and Sky Digital. The album received a favourable a review in the Winter 2004 issue of Kaleidoscope, this publication also featured the band in its Top Ten section. Interviews with the band also appeared in the Summer 2004 issue of Kaleidoscope and The Worst Fanzine. Their performance at the Beyond The Veil Festival was to be reviewed in the May 2004 edition of Starvox Music Zine and the band was featured in the Bands to watch out for this year section of Meltdown Magazine (Winter 2004). May 2004 the Screaming Banshee Aircrew were interviewed on University Radio York and by 2006 their music was being used for soundtracks on Meltdown TV (a show aired on the Detonator.tv channel) and the August edition of CGI comic drama Bloodspell (later to be compiled into the Bloodspell movie).

In January 2005, the band headlined a Tsunami Charity event in York, which was covered by the York Daily Gazette.

Screaming Banshee Aircrew performed on 3 March 2006 at the 'Eating the Elephant' club night at The White Room in Hull reviewed by Sandman magazine.

The track Uproot Them from their debut release was included on the German compilation album Kultur Ruine 2005 release.

In 2007 after the departure of founder member Nick Daniel, the band had increased their lineup to a six-piece and added live drums and violin to their stageshow. This lineup was to release a live DVD, Screaming Banshee Aircrew: Do London, distributed by Resurrection Records and featuring footage of their London show in February 2008 at famous music venue the Bull And Gate, London.

The second album on the Resurrection Records deal, When All Is Said And Done was released in June 2007.

Events during this year included an opening performance at Leeds Metropolitan University with Chris Reed Unit (ex-Red Lorry Yellow Lorry), Salvation, James Ray and the newly reunited The March Violets in their homecoming show.

A second appearance in April at the Whitby Gothic Weekend also resulted in the band being mentioned in the 2008 publication The Dead Travel Fast: Stalking Vampires from Nosferatu To Count Chocula. The band featured in the May 2007 Guardian/Observer article "We bonded over the goths and the punks" by Ed Vulliamy as a result of their UK 2007 tour support for The Birthday Massacre. Other coverage during this period included two-page interview in The Worst Fanzine, a review of When All Is Said And Done in Unscene Magazine, an interview in the Nemesis to Go online magazine, a full page article by Brian Heywood in the Luton News and an appearance in the Goth Incoming section of the September 2007 issue of Metal Hammer. The band also appeared in several issues of The Mick (Issues 8 to 12), an online magazine by author and ex Melody Maker writer Mick Mercer as well as in his 2009 book publication, Music to Die For (Cherry Red Books).

Between 2001 and 2008, Screaming Banshee Aircrew performed with numerous European and US bands within the gothic, deathrock, and alternative genres, including Nosferatu, Skeletal Family, Zombina and the Skeletones, Penetration, and Clan Of Xymox.

== Final appearances ==
2009 saw the band reduce to a four-piece and switch focus towards a darker minimal, post-punk sound with tribal drumming and increased use of violin. Their final album, Sugar, was produced by Jim Spencer (best known for his work with The Charlatans) and released on the Resurrection Records label in July 2010. This lineup appeared extensively in London, including a notable performance for the Red Stripe Awards, as reviewed by The Fly. During this period, the Screaming Banshee Aircrew performed with a range of post-punk acts such as Wayne Hussey, Violet Violet, The Mai 68s, I Concur, Object, Luxury Stranger, GLASS, The Vile Imbeciles, The Gaa Gaas, Hindley, Cold In Berlin, ROMANCE, and The Dogbones. Sugar was reviewed on Sphere Magazine and the band were featured on the NME website's NME: Freakscene – The Screaming Banshee Aircrew – Make Some Noise!. Around this time, SBA were to be referenced in "The Bats Have Left The Bell Tower", an article on the role London plays in Goth music on LondonNet.

== Dissolution ==
The Screaming Banshee Aircrew finally disbanded in July 2010 with a set of performances for Chamber at New Cross in London and the DV8 Festival in York which featured a guest appearance from original guitarist, Nick Daniel. This final performance was reviewed in the Terrorizor Magazine pull-out, Dominion Magazine and they would record their final interview at this event for Sphere Magazine.

In September 2010, an article on the Terrorizer website cited Screaming Banshee Aircrew as an example of a band that attempted to bridge the gap, between mainstream perceptions of Goth music and the underground Goth scene in the UK. Screaming Banshee Aircrew were also covered (and pictured) in Worldwide Gothic: A Chronicle of a Tribe by respected journalist and presenter, Natasha Scharf.

The final lineup consisted of: Mister Ed, Chris Banshee, Jo Violet and Neal Unreal.

Following the breakup, Jo Violet, Neal Unreal and Chris Banshee joined Alexander King of York band GLASS to begin performing under the name Berlin Black And The Shades Of Grey, which had previously been Chris Banshee's solo project. Berlin Black were to perform their debut performance at the DV8 Festival the day after the final Screaming Banshee Aircrew show.

In June 2010, Chris Banshee and Neal Unreal were announced as the new members of Simon York's band Luxury Stranger, in time for a European tour supporting Chameleons Vox.

Nick Daniel went on to join Scream Arena, releasing their self-titled album on Mighty Music / Target Group records. He is currently working on his musical space rock opera 'Elevate' – which features guest appearances from both Ed Tuke and Chris Tuke. Chris Banshee went on to run the Trash Vogue Records independent record label. Neal Unreal continues to work closely with John Richards, Danai Pappa and the Dirty Electronics Ensemble. Singer/songwriter Ed Banshee (Mister Ed) made a guest appearance with Devilish Presley in March 2011, and went on to co-found the Partly Faithful with Gemma Thompson (Hindley, John and Jehn, Savages) and Chris Brown (Somewhere Outside New York, Dr Vampire).

As well as her work with Berlin Black And The Shades Of Grey, Jo Violet joined The March Violets as bassist, taking part in their Islington Academy 2010 reunion show and subsequently recording on their new album.

== Members ==
- Mister Ed (Ed Tuke) – vocals (2001–2010)
- Chris Banshee (Chris Tuke) – bass, guitar, drums (2001–2010)
- Vix-Hun – vocals (2001–2002)
- Nick Daniel – guitar (2001–2006)
- Jo Violet (Joanna Moy) – vocals, bass, guitar, violin (2002–2010)
- Neal Unreal (Neal Spowage) – keyboards, drums, guitar (2007–2010)
- Donnie Blue (Donovan Bocek) – drums (2007)
- Tina Smash (Tina Williams) – drums (2007–2008)
- Tori Pink (Tori Kemp) – bass (2007–2008)

== Discography ==
- 2001: No Camping (EP): EP
- 2002: The Screaming Banshee Video Showcase: VHS Video
- 2003: Titanic Verses: EP
- 2003: Titanic Verses – Now With Extra Wreckage: compilation Album
- 2004: Fishnet Messiah: Album (Worldwide release by the Resurrection Records label)
- 2005: Kulture Ruin: Fishnet Messiah track 'Uproot Them' part of this German compilation Album
- 2007: When All Is Said And Done: Album (Worldwide release by the Resurrection Records label)
- 2008: Screaming Banshee Aircrew: Do London: DVD Video (UK distribution by the Resurrection Records label)
- 2008: Goth Is What You Make It [Seven]: When All Is Said And Done track 'Crazy Cats' part of this German compilation Album
- 2009: Sugar: Album (Worldwide release by the Resurrection Records label)
