= Dream Disciples =

- Origin: Scotland
- Genres: Gothic rock, Industrial rock, Electronic rock
- Years active: 1990–2004
- Past members: Col Lowing – vocals; Julian "Sid" Bratley – guitar, keyboards; Stephen McKean – bass guitar; Scott Prentice – drums; Gordon Young – guitar, keyboards; Karl North – bass guitar

Dream Disciples were a Scottish band, formed in 1990 by Col Lowing (vocals), Julian 'Sid' Bratley (guitar and keyboard) and Stephen McKean (bass guitar). Soon joined by Scott Prentice on drums, they made their debut with the mini-album Veil of Tears. They were later joined by Gordon Young (guitar and keyboards) and Karl North (ex Rosetta Stone) (bass guitar). Their musical style combined elements of goth, industrial, rock, and electronic.

The band sold over 16,000 albums in their history, with their last studio album, Asphyxia, rated at 8/10 in Rock Sound magazine, 4K in Kerrang! and 8.5 in Terrorizer. Their 1995 album In Amber received a glowing review in The Catholic Times, where it was named 'Album of the month'.

Mick Mercer's Hex Files: The Goth Bible (1996) described the Dream Disciples as "one of the hardest working bands around." This was partly due to the band's extensive touring around Europe. In 2001, they played at the Eurorock festival (in Neerpelt, Belgium); they also headlined the Whitby Gothic Weekend (England), playing a total of four times, with a final performance in April 2004, supporting The Mission. Dream Disciples split up later that year.

== Discography ==
- 1991 – Veil of Tears (studio album)
- 1992 – Activation (cassette EP)
- 1993 – Sundance (cassette EP)
- 1995 – In Amber (studio album)
- 1996 – A Cure for Pain (studio album)
- 1997 – At the Edge of the Abyss (live album)
- 1998 – Subatomic (studio album)
- 2001 – Asphyxia (studio album)
- 2002 – Gestalt (live album)
