= Die Laughing =

Die Laughing may refer to:

- Death from laughter
- Die Laughing (album), a stand-up comedy album by Doug Stanhope
- Die Laughing (band), a British goth band
- Die Laughing (film), a 1980 American film
- "Die Laughing" (song), a song by Therapy?
- Die Laughing, a 1998 Batman/Judge Dredd crossover
