= Rome Burns =

British post-punk/gothic rock band

- Origin: Cambridgeshire, England
- Genres: Post punk Alternative rock Gothic rock
- Years active: 1995–Present
- Members: Simon Satori Hendley; Daevid Jael; Gregor Samsa; Nevla
- Past members: Stoo; Matti; Tori Pink; Heather
- Website: http://www.romeburns.co.uk/

Rome Burns are a British three-piece post-punk/gothic rock band from Cambridgeshire, England. Formed in 1995, they have had a number of line-up changes, currently consisting of a lead vocalist, two guitarists, and a drum machine. Despite not being signed to a label, their music has received worldwide distribution via Resurrection Records (London, UK), CD-Baby (Portland OR, USA) and also online streaming services.

Generally considered (by the genre's press) as the "Politest Band in Goth", Rome Burns have supported Gene Loves Jezebel, Eva O, The Last Dance, The Crüxshadows, Inkubus Sukkubus and NFD.

== Career ==
Previous bass player Tori Pink, has also been a member of Screaming Banshee Aircrew, touring extensively with them and appearing on their album, When All is Said and Done. In June 2009, Tori Pink left the band to concentrate on her career, but has not ruled out the possibility of appearing live on a future tour. After a hiatus the band got back together at the beginning of 2010 and hired a new bassist, Heather, in February 2010.

Rome Burns guitarist, Nevla, was also part of the revolving live line-up for All Living Fear, as well as contributing some material towards their album Fifteen Years After. In late 2010 he also joined the Gothic/Electronica band Last July, to add a layer of guitar to their synth sounds. He announced he was leaving the band in late 2011 in order to focus more on Last July and in preparation for his imminent fatherhood. He played his last concert on 28 January 2012 at The Library in Leeds.

Frontman Simon Satori Hendley has written a number of books. His first novel, Assumptions and Carnations was published in 2006 by Storm Constantine's publishing house Immanion Press. His second book, Apathy: A Cause Not Worth Fighting For, was published in 2007 by Crombie Jardine Publishing Limited.

In 2005 their second album, Non Specific Ghost Stories, received critical acclaim from journalist Mick Mercer, who described it as a "work of magnificent inspiration."

Their third album, The Static Murmur was released in November 2008. It was again favourably reviewed by Mick Mercer, who described it as "beautifully produced... more than enough variety and endless layers of lyrical idiosyncrasies to ponder upon." Hard Wired magazine described the album as "imaginative".

The album was released in the US via CD Baby and also again by Resurrection Records in Europe. The album was also made available for digital download via Apple's iTunes service, Napster and other digital retailers. May 2009 saw the release of the band's first video, for the track "The Escapologist", taken off the same album. The video features a live escapologist, whilst the lyrics use escapology as a metaphor for being trapped inside a relationship.

After many months of inactivity, it was announced on 15 August that Rome Burns would be calling it a day after 17 years. Nevla was approached to play at the final two planned concert dates but had to decline due to prior commitments to both his band Last July and to his family. Just prior to this announcement Heather had decided to leave the band, and Tori was persuaded to rejoin the band for these final two gigs. The 'final' Rome Burns concert was held on 22 September 2012, at the Slimelight club, London.

Despite splitting up in 2012, Rome Burns have failed to ‘stay split’ and have continued to get together to play occasional gigs in the UK and mainland Europe. Simon Satori has also been lending his vocals to Sol Invictus, performing on the Ghostly Whistlings EP in 2017 and the Necropolis album in 2018.

In 2019, they completed a successful Kickstarter campaign to raise money to make a new album, entitled All Monsters to Angels. Principal recording for this took place in September 2019, with a release in December 2019. Also in December 2019, all their previous album releases were rereleased through Distrokid, after ending their long-term partnership with CD Baby.

In the summer of 2022 the band embarked on their first proper tour of the UK, labelled "The Triumvirate Tour" with fellow UK acts The Way of All Flesh, and Byronic Sex and Exile

== Band Members ==
=== Current ===
- Simon Satori Hendley
- Gregor Samsa
- Daevid Jael
- Nevla

=== Past ===
- Stoo Goff
- Matti
- Tori Pink
- Heather

=== Session ===
- Mike Uwins

== Discography ==
- All Monsters to Angels album (released through Distrokid, December 2019)
- The Static Murmur album (released through CD Baby+Resurrection Records, November 2008)
- Non Specific Ghost Stories album (released via Resurrection Records), November 2004)
1. "Non Specific Ghost Story" - 5:17
2. "ZD576" - 4:22
3. "Empty Samsara" - 1:54
4. "The Nexus" - 5:24
5. "Seeking Mr Hyde" - 3:35
6. "Waterbabes Drowning" - 6:51
7. "Stone Garden" - 4:49
8. "Apocatastasis" - 4:55
9. "War of the Pygmies" - 3:45
10. "Blue Boy" - 4:26
- Untitled Album Demo CDR (Self Release, March 2003)
- Swoon Promotional CDR (Self release, 1999)
- Done and Dusted album (Self release, 1999)
- Bereaved or Bereft EP (Self release, 1998)
- The Eventual Eclipse Cassette (Self release, 1997)
