= Sanctuary Medicines =

Studio album by Rico
- Released: 1999
- Genre: Industrial rock
- Label: Chrysalis

Rico chronology
Sanctuary Medicines (1999)	Violent Silences (2004)

Sanctuary Medicines is the debut album of Scottish industrial rock artist Rico, released in 1999 by Chrysalis Records. It is the precursor to his independently released Violent Silences album.

== Track listing ==
#	Track
1	Shave Your Head
2	Aeroplane
3	Smokescreen
4	Black Limo
5	Float
6	Overload
7	Sanctuary Medicines
8	This + That
9	State
10	Attack Me
11	Dear God
