= All Living Fear =

English gothic rock band, formed 1992

- Origin: England
- Genres: Gothic rock; post-punk; alternative rock
- Years active: 1992–2000; 2001–2012; 2017 – present
- Labels: Dangernoise
- Members: Matthew North; Andrew Racher; Paul Roe; Michael Webb
- Past members: Michael Soundy; Niall Parker; Nevla; Steven Howson; Caroline Jago; Steve Takle; Ant Whitehouse; Steve Williams
- Website: www.alllivingfear.co.uk

All Living Fear are an English gothic rock band from the South West of England. The band was formed in 1992 by Matthew North and the core of the band was sealed in 1994 with the arrival of vocalist Andrew Racher.

The band were prolific in the mid-1990s British gothic scene and gained a large underground following: their debut single, "Jessica", sold out of its first pressing in just a few weeks Kerrang! magazine's review comparing Racher's vocals to Dave Vanian of The Damned. "Jessica" was the only release to have a drummer (John Macklin, from the progressive rock band Legend) and to be produced by Steve Paine (also from Legend).

All Living Fear were described by Mick Mercer in his Hex files book as "The hardest working band in this section" (ref UK Bands)

All Living Fear toured extensively in the UK, picking up support slots with major UK goth bands including Nosferatu, Inkubus Sukkubus, James Ray's Gangwar, Spear of Destiny and Flipper. All Living Fear played the first ever Whitby Gothic Weekend and have played it several times since.

The band's first album, The Widow's Blame, had a two-page review in Sound on Sound magazine. This album and its follow-up, Minimum Resistance, both sold out of their initial pressings and subsequent pressings were released through Resurrection Records.

Racher left in 1998 and was replaced by Paul Roe, under whose influence the band took a more rock-orientated direction. A third album, Into the Light, was released before the band split, with North and Roe going on to form Corrosion. In 2001 Racher and North reformed All Living Fear and released a fourth album, Home Too Soon, which they promoted with support slots for Wayne Hussey, The Damned and All About Eve.

In November 2007 the Dangernoise label released 15 Years After, a double CD comprising new recordings of some of the band's tracks, some unreleased songs, new material and remixes. It featured guest performances from Arthur Brown (with whom North had worked extensively), Julianne Regan, Nick Pynn, Christian Riou (Claytown Troupe) and Steve Bronski (Bronski Beat).

In August 2009, Racher announced he was leaving the band after almost 15 years' involvement, in order to spend more time with his family. The band continue with North as vocalist and guitar, Niall Parker on bass, Steve Williams (Complicity, Christian Death, Altered States) on guitar and Nevla (Rome Burns) on guitar.

In 2010 Matthew announced he was forming a new band, Secrets For September, and in 2012 via Facebook that the band would re-form for its 20th anniversary for some shows in the autumn, including the Whitby Gothic Weekend; this ended up being a new version of the band fronted by North, and they also released a new album Coming Home with a cameo performance from Roger O'Donnell of The Cure on the last track. North joined the Mike Westbrook Uncommon Orchestra in 2014 they released the album A Bigger Show produced by Jon Hiseman in 2016. North Released his debut solo album Stimm THINKING? still DREAMING in 2017 on Dangernoise records.

In a post to Facebook on 10 December 2016 the band announced a reunion of the mid-1990s duo format of Matthew North and Andrew Racher to play live for the band's 25th anniversary.

On 11 November 2017, All Living Fear performed with Paul Roe (bass guitar) and Michael Webb (guitar). This is now regarded as the current lineup.

== Discography ==
=== Singles ===
- "Jessica" (1994) (Pagan Media / Second Pressing- Ossia Germany)
- "The Widow's Blame" (2007) (With Arthur Brown iTunes only)
- "Twenty Nine Point Nine" (2010) (Download 3 track EP)
- "Broken Dream" (2010) (Download 4 track EP)
- "Breaking The Fire" (2011) (Download 3 track EP)
- "Crimson" (2014) (iTunes / Amazon / Spotify)

== Albums ==
- The Widow’s Blame (1995) (Resurrection)
- Minimum Resistance (1996) (Resurrection)
- Vintage Fear (1997) (Self Release)
- Into The Light (1998) (Resurrection)
- Home Too Soon (2003) (Resurrection)
- Fifteen Years After (2007) (Dangernoise)
- Coming Home (2012) (Dangernoise)

=== DVDs and videos ===
- 'Fear On The Road' (VHS 1996)
- 'Official Bootleg Video' (VHS 1999)
- 'Video Anthology 1994–2004' (VHS and DVD 2005)
- 'Live In Concert' (DVD 2009)
