= Zombina and the Skeletones =

English horror punk band

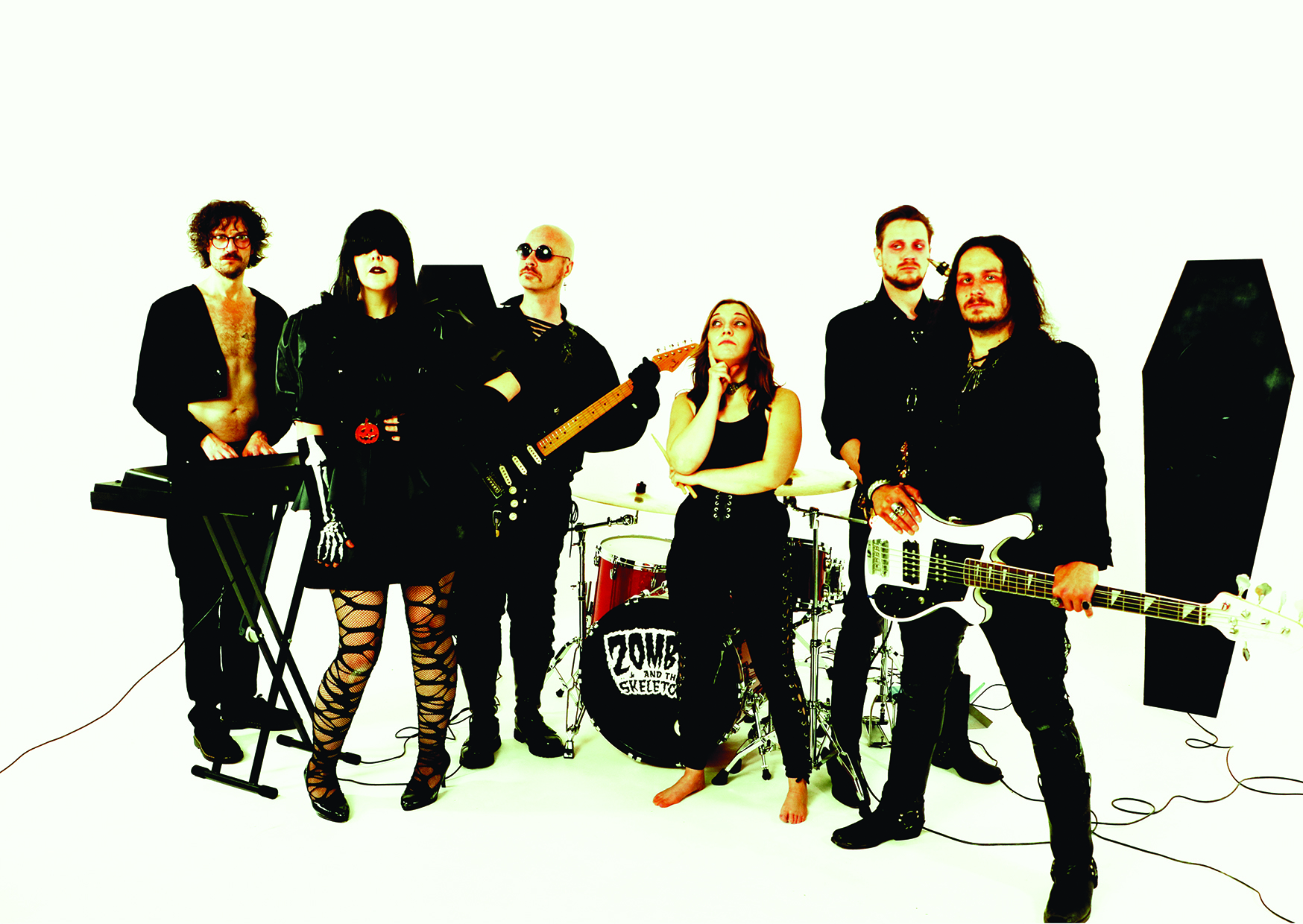
- Zombina and the Skeletones on the set of the "Don't Kick My Coffin" music video

Background information
- Also known as: ZATS
- Origin: Liverpool, England
- Genres: Horror punk; deathrock; gothic rock
- Years active: 1998–present
- Labels: 9x9 Records, Fiend Force, Ectoplastic
- Members: Zombina; Doc Horror; X-Ray Speck; Petelgeuse "All Hallows" Eve; Chopin Bloc
- Website: www.zombina.co.uk

Zombina and the Skeletones are an English rock band from Liverpool, formed in 1998 with vocalist Zombina and songwriter Doc Horror.

Their musical style is pop-oriented, with elements of garage punk, doo-wop and hard rock. Due to their apparent obsession with B-movies and black humour, their fanbase extends to the gothic rock, deathrock and psychobilly scenes. The majority of their lyrical content deals with themes of horror and science fiction.

== History ==
=== Formation ===
Zombina met Doc Horror at Calderstones School in 1998. They started a band called The Deformed, producing a demo tape "No Sleep 'Til Transylvania", in early 1999. This tape featured songs that would later be featured on Zombina and the Skeletones albums: "The Grave... And Beyond!", "Braindead" and "Leave My Brain Alone". Since the early years of their formation, the band established a strong B-Movie informed horror theme recalling the early efforts of Misfits and The Cramps.

=== Career ===
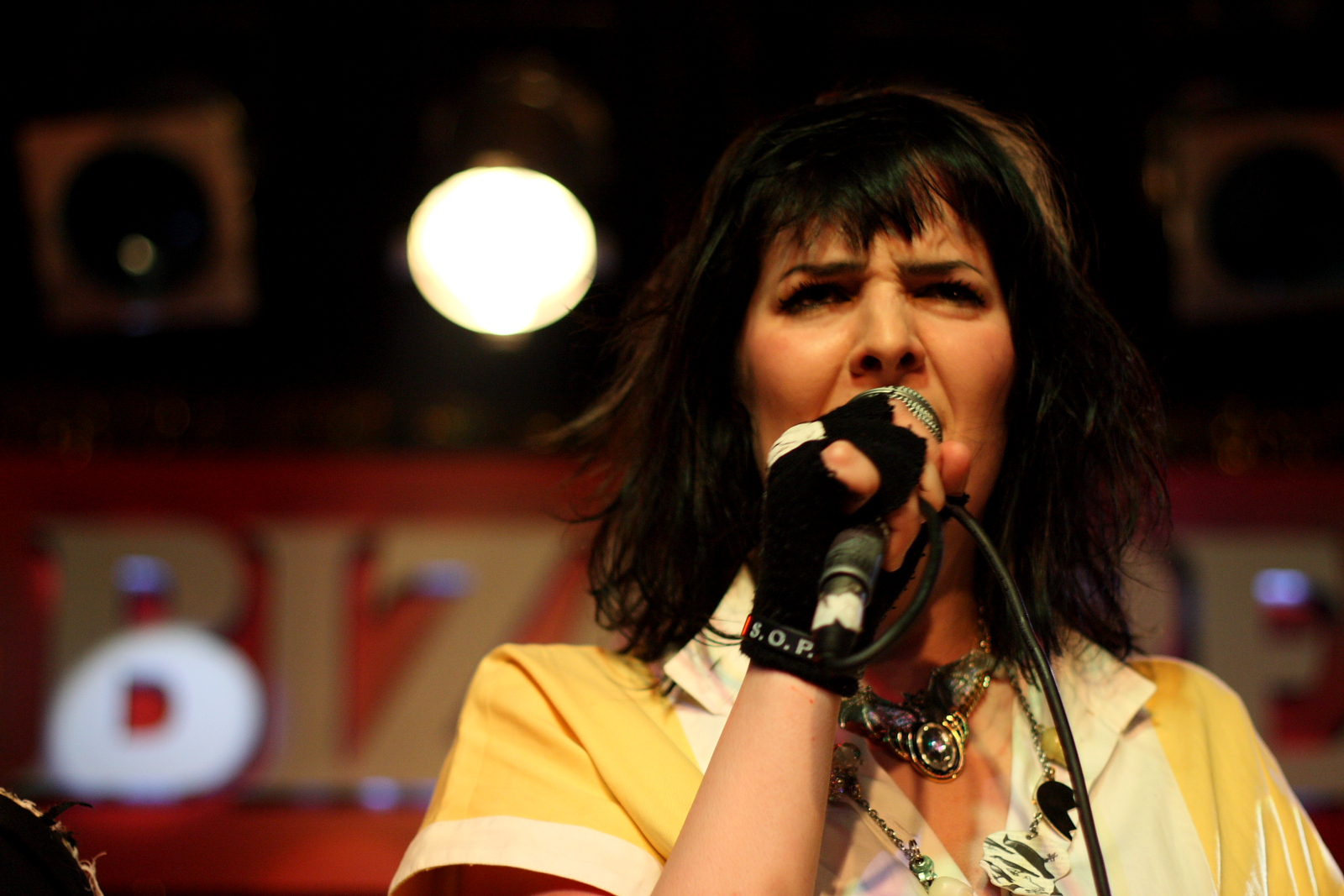
Zombina performs with the band in London in May 2009

In 2005, Zombina and the Skeletones were a featured unsigned band on Mark Radcliffe's show on BBC Radio 2. They have also toured the UK with bands such as the Damned, Misfits and The Meteors.

2006 saw the band headlining Lumous Gothic Festival, Finland. Then in 2007, they played at the Wave-Gotik-Treffen, the very large goth/alternative festival in Leipzig, Germany. They have also played the British Whitby Gothic Weekend four times, first in 2004 and most recently in 2013.

Zombina and the Skeletones have been featured in the UK magazine, Bizarre, and played live at the 2008 "Bizarre Ball" in London. They were scheduled to appear at "Abertoir, the Welsh Horror Festival", and performed as part of the festival.

The band was largely in hiatus during 2012, performing only one show (supporting the Primitives). A new EP, That Doll Just Tried to Kill Me, was released at Halloween 2012, with a Halloween show on 3 November 2012 in Liverpool, anticipating an album release in early 2013.

The whole line-up of Zombina and the Skeletones guest-starred in Cuban American singer Voltaire's 2014 album Raised by Bats, providing additional vocals for the track "Oh, My Goth!".

=== Reviews ===
The band has received positive reviews from the UK music scene website Drowned in Sound. Their 2005 "Counting on your Suicide" was selected by goth/punk journalist Mick Mercer as one of his "Thirty best goth records of all time".

== Members ==
- Zombina Venus Hatchett - Vocals/Theremin (1999–present)
- Doc Horror - Guitar/Bass/Vocals (1999–present)
- X-Ray Speck - Saxophone (2008–present)
- "All Hallows" Eve - Drums (2022–present)
- Chopin Block - keyboard (2013-2015, 2023-present)
- Petelgeuse - Bass (2024-present)
- Kyle K'Thulu - Bass (2008–present)

=== Past members ===
- Jay Hem - Drums (2014–2017)
- Ben Digo - Drums (2006–2017) (ex-The Dangerfields and Bus Station Loonies)
- John Paul Ghostier - Saxophone (2013)
- Para Normal - Bass (2013)
- Velma DeVine - backing vocals (1999–2002)
- Tiddles - backing vocals/cello (1999–2002)
- Grim Outlook - guitar (1999–2004)
- Taylor Woah - guitar (2004)
- Ratt-Lynn Bones aka Kit Shivers - drums/guitar (1999–2005)
- Louie Diablo - guitar/vocals/handclaps (2004–2006)
- Pete Martin - drums (2006)
- Jonny Tokyo - keyboard/bass/vocals (1999–2008)
- Jettison Dervish - bass (2005 – 17 May 2008)

== Discography ==
=== Albums ===
- Taste the Blood of Zombina and the Skeletones (2002)
- Death Valley High (2006)
- Monsters on 45 (2006) reissued 2009 with extra track
- Out of the Crypt and Into Your Heart (2008)
- Charnel House Rock (2014)
- The Call of Zombina (2024)
- In Sinistereo (2025)

=== Compilations ===
- The Eerie Years (comprises the Love Bites and Silver Bullet EPs)
- Get Thee Behind Me Santa (Puppy Dog Records 2002) - includes 'Transylvanian Xmas'
- Too Much Horror Business A Tribute to The Misfits - includes 'Misfits Medley'
- When the Kids Go Go Go Crazy - A Tribute To The Groovie Ghoulies
- Paid in Black Vol. 2 - A Tribute To Johnny Cash

=== EPs ===
- Loves Bites (2000)
- Halloween Hollerin'! (2003) (now available as a download EP with an extra track)
- 7 Song Promo EP (2004)
- 3 Songs vs. Your Brain (2006)
- A Chainsaw for Christmas (download EP) (2006)
- Halloween Party Classics (download EP) (2007)
- That Doll Just Tried To Kill Me (2012)
- In Sinistereo (Part One) (2015)
- In Sinistereo (Part Two) (2015)
- In Sinistereo (Part Three) (2016)
- In Sinistereo (Part Four) (2017)

=== 7" EP Trilogy ===
- I Was a Human Bomb for the F.B.I. (2004)
- Mondo Zombina! (2005)
- Staci Stasis (2005)

=== Singles ===
- "Silver Bullet" (2001)
- "Frankenlady" (2002)
- "Nobody Likes You When You're Dead" b/w "Deflesh Mode" (remix) (2002)
- "Dracula Blood" b/w "Deep Vein Thrombosis" (remix) download single (2007)
- "Teenage Caveman Beat Gargantua" / "Futurelife" (2011)
- "Love Is Strange" (2014) (featuring Argyle Goolsby of Blitzkid)
- "Love Like Blood" (2023) (Side Z on "Split Up!" single, Blitzkid cover)
- "Don't Kick My Coffin" b/w "Touch Me and Die" (2024)

=== Soundtracks ===
- Poultrygeist: Night of the Chicken Dead (2006)
- Shakespeare's Shitstorm (2020)

=== Bootlegs ===
- Dial Z for Zombina (recorded live at Club Useless 14 September 2004)
