= Rhombus (UK band) =

British gothic rock band

- Origin: Huddersfield, England
- Genres: Gothic rock, alternative rock
- Years active: 2002–present
- Labels: Models Own Records, Resurrection Records, afmusic
- Members: Rob Walker; Alixandrea Corvyn; Edward Grassby; Lee Talbot
- Past members: Ben Grassby; Liz Grassby; Simon "Scardy" Cardwell; Ian "FTG" Grinn (Pringle); Mya (Lloyd); Ed Wolstenholme; Andy Holmes
- Website: rhombus.band

Rhombus are a British gothic rock band based in West Yorkshire, England.

== History ==
Originally formed in Bristol, England, in 2002 by bass player Ed Grassby and featuring his brother and sister-in-law on guitars, the band started to gain momentum after Ed relocated to Huddersfield, West Yorkshire and recruited new guitarists Robert Walker and Simon Cardwell.

The band played extensively around the UK for the next few years gaining a reputation for solid live performances; and intelligent and often witty lyrics.

The band's profile rose as they acquired support gigs with bands such as the Damned and NFD as well as playing with a number of bands who went on to form the base of the contemporary UK Goth Rock scene.

A string of self-released EPs (Rat City, 2003, Attention Seeker, 2004, The Closing Time EP, 2006) led to their music being added to club and alternative radio playlists around the world.

In July 2007, the band put out their first full album. Remembrance Day was released on CD and digital download through Resurrection Records. The album was well received gaining solid reviews which led to more club and radio play, bigger gigs and a support tour with NFD. The album featured a number of guest artists including female rock singer Mya and musician Ian Grinn, both of whom had originally met Rhombus at the band's first gig when Rhombus supported The Sisters of Murphy, a Sisters of Mercy tribute act.

Shortly after the completion of the album, the band asked Mya to join full-time adding a well received extra dimension to the band's sound. At this time the band started to put more effort into their stage appearance and to take their business a little more seriously.

In June 2009, Simon Cardwell quit the band. With a string of high-profile dates already booked, the band approached Ian Grinn to ask if he would step in as second guitarist so that the band could honour the bookings. After a positive reaction, Grinn was asked to join full-time. Grinn was better known as a punk, hard rock and folk singer-songwriter though he had been involved in gothic rock as a long serving member of The Sisters of Murphy.

With the new line-up settled and a new rockier sound, the band set about writing and recording their second album. The addition of Mya and Grinn as both experienced songwriters and recording musicians to the fold allowed Ed and Rob, hitherto the creative force behind the band to raise their game further and the result was the album Open the Sky which the band completed recording at their own studio in October 2009. However, unhappy with the initial mastered mix, the band took the decision to stop the pressing and drafted in Stephen Carey of This Burning Effigy, Adoration and The Eden House to remix.

The band played a main venue set at the Whitby Gothic Weekend on 1 November, where they issued a free CD-R named Monked Up the Sky to fans by way of apology for the delayed album release.

The remixed and remastered Open the Sky was eventually released through Resurrection Records in the UK and digitally on af-Music worldwide in January 2010. The album received a raft of excellent reviews and the band's profile raised another step.

In January 2011, Rhombus released The Anywhere EP, a four track release composed of the song "Anywhere" and two new tracks "Timeless and Elegant" and "Nowhere". Carey was once again given mixing duties and produced an extended remix of "Anywhere" to complete the EP.

2011 saw the band pick up their first European dates, their debut being in Berlin in support of former Skeletal Family and Ghost Dance lead singer Anne-Marie Hurst.

== Members ==
Current

- Rob Walker - lead guitar
- Alixandrea Corvyn - vocals
- Edward Grassby - vocals, bass
- Lee Talbot - drums

Former

- Ben Grassby
- Liz Grassby
- Simon "Scardy" Cardwell
- Ian "FTG" Grinn (Pringle)
- Mya (Lloyd)
- Ed Wolstenholme
- Andy Holmes

== Discography ==
=== Albums ===
- 2003: Rat City (Models Own Records)
- 2007: Remembrance Day (Models Own Records / Resurrection Records)
- 2010: Open the Sky (Resurrection Records / afmusic)
- 2013: Here Be Dragons (Models Own Records)
- 2021: The Longest Day (Models Own Records)

=== EPs ===
- 2002: The Rough Demo (Models Own Records)
- 2003: The Soul The Spirit & The Wish (Models Own Records)
- 2004: Attention Seeker (Models Own Records)
- 2006: The Closing Time EP (Models Own Records)
- 2011: Anywhere EP (Models Own Records / afmusic)
- 2015: Purity & Perversion (Models Own Records)
- 2016: Purity & Perversion (Deluxe Edition) (Models Own Records)

=== Singles ===
- 2020: Magnificent (Models Own Records)
- 2021: Sodium Sunrise (Models Own Records)
- 2022: Always Hope (Models Own Records)
