= The Breath of Life (band) =

Belgian band

- Origin: Belgium
- Genres: Gothic rock; darkwave
- Years active: 1985–present
- Label: Big Bang / Hall of Sermon / Danse Macabre Records /
- Members: Isabelle Dekeyser; Philippe Mauroy; Didier Czepczyk; Giovanni Bortolin
- Website: the-breath-of-life.com

The Breath of Life is a Belgian rock band.

== Musical style ==
I guess you can say that The Breath of Life are an institution in the Belgian Goth scene. During decades they were, without any doubt, the sole Belgian band who was able to blend ethereal darkwave, gothrock and post-punk. Or perhaps it is better just to think of The Breath of Life as they created a very personal sound.

— Peek A Boo magazine, February 2015

== History ==
The group was born in 1985 in Gembloux when Isabelle Dekeyser (vocals), Philippe Mauroy (guitar) and Benoît Sokay (bass) met up for the first time. In 1990, with the arrival of Giovanni Bortolin (keyboards & violin – ex Jo Lemaire + Flouze) and the decision to use a Drum machine the group began to get foothold and refined its musical style. That same year, they won the Verdur Rock contest in Namur and self-produced a 10 tracks tape. In 1991 the band went on tour in Czechoslovakia and again the following year. Their first CD Live in Praha 92 highlights a recording of a concert in Prague.

This first production is followed the same year by the first studio album Painful Insanity recorded by Gilles Martin, cult producer of Coldwave (Minimal Compact, Tuxedomoon, Anna Domino, Colin Newman, Malaria, The Names, ... and in other styles Deus, Miossec or Indochine). 1993 saw the release of Taste of Sorrow which remains for many their iconic album. Also produced by Martin it contains the title "Nasty Cloud" that became a classic gothic hit. "The songs are endearing and energetic, with the bass well forward, nerve guitars, original use of the violin, electronic stormy moods and sometimes lyrical, sometimes angry voices" as describes in the book "Carnets Noirs" in the chapter on the Dark-Wave international scene. In 1995 the band released Lost Children which developed more delicate atmospheres in ethereal wave style. The Group signed with Hall of Sermon for the next album Sweet Party released in 1997. This marks a more pop and electronic turn. In 2000 Silver Drops was released with Martin behind the mixing desk again. The melancholic pop tinged with Trip hop orientation is confirmed. This album was the last one with Martin at production. Shortly after Mauroy left the band and Didier Czepczyk took over on guitars.

Albums Everlasting Souls (2005) and Whispering Fields (2012) marked a return to more gothic atmospheres, the abandonment of the drum machine and the arrival of drummer Marc Haerden. The group is then signed by the label Danse Macabre. Benoît Sokay, bassist since the beginning left in 2014. In January 2015 Philippe Mauroy rejoined the band almost 15 years after having left it.

In May 2017 the album Under The Falling Stars is released and see the return of Gilles Martin behind the mixing desk. The album has received excellent reviews. In August 2017 it reached the 6th place of German Alternative Charts.

In 2020, the band decided to record their 10th album during the COVID-19 pandemic and while Belgium was still in lockdown. This was therefore done in a particular way, each members recording their parts of the songs at home and sharing their files using WeTransfer. However, two members of the band travelled to France and met Gilles Martin for the final mix when rules in regards to COVID-19 allowed it. The album entitled "Spark Around Us" came out in November 2020 and was well received by fans and critics.

During the lockdown in Belgium the band recorded three covers : Winning from The Sound, Ashes To Ashes from David Bowie, Inner Station from Minimal Compact. These three songs has been only released on Bandcamp. In 2022, for different compilation projects, they have been asked by the Belgian record label Alfa Matrix to cover a song from the Belgian electro project Implant, a song from the electro pop band Psy'Aviah and a song from the Italian project Imjudas.

The Breath of Life has among others played at the Dour Festival (B), Whitby Goth Weekend (GB), M'era Luna Festival (D), Zillo festival (D), Wave-Gotik-Treffen (D), Castle Party Festival (PL), Underworld Camden (GB) ... The group performed in Belgium, Czech Republic, Denmark, England, France, Germany, Greece, Hungary, Italy, Lithuania, Luxembourg, the Netherlands, Poland, Slovakia, Spain and Switzerland.

== Discography ==
=== Live album ===
- Live in Praha '92 CD (Azyl records/Magic Language records 1992)

=== Studio albums ===
- Painful Insanity CD (Big Bang Records/Magic Language Records, 1992)
- Taste of Sorrow CD (Third Fingers/Magic Language Records/Hall of Sermon, 1994)
- Lost Children CD (Magic Language Records/Hall of Sermon, 1996)
- Sweet Party CD (Magic Language Records/Hall of Sermon, 1996)
- Silver Drops CD (Magic Language Records/Hall of Sermon, 2000)
- Everlasting Souls CD (Magic Language Records/Dark Wings/Subzero/Musicflash, 2005)
- Whispering Fields CD (Magic Language Records/Danse Macabre 2012)
- Under The Falling Stars CD & Vinyl (Wool-E discs / Magic Language Records, 2017)
- Sparks Around Us CD & Vinyl (Wool-E discs / Magic Language Records, 2020)

=== Maxi CD ===
- Shining MCD (Third finger records/magic language records/Hall of sermon1995)

=== Compilations ===
- Rock en stock cd (Wallonie Bruxelles musiques 1992) including "Walking Line" & "Time"
- L'appel de la muse vol.3 cd (Alea jacta est 1993) including "Fat Brutus"
- Touched by the hand of Goth cd (Subterranean 1995) including "Nasty Cloud"
- Rock pop Bratislava cd (Gato loco 1995) including "Shining"
- Zillo dark progressive soundsampler 1 cd (Zillo 1996) including "Idyll" remix version
- Touched by the hand of Goth vol.2 cd (Subterranean 1996) including "The last four days"
- Heavenly voices part 4 cd (Hyperium 1996) including "Kutna Hora"
- Hex files vol. 1 cd (nova tek – credo 1996) including "Living in a dream"
- Gothic compilation part 8 cd (Gothic magazine # 28 gothic records 1998) including "The wind"
- Hex files vol. 3 cd (nova tek – credo 1998) including "Shining"
- Sanctuary French club hits cd (Zoomshot 1999) including "Nasty cloud"
- Angel's delight cd (Zoomshot 1999) including "Worries"
- Ladies, queens and sluts cd (Hall of sermon 1999) including "Fly"
- Elegy numéro 8 sampler cd (Elegy 2000) including "Silver sky"
- Gothicworld sampler vol 1 cd (2000) including "Tower"
- Castle party 2000 cd (Koch international 2000) including "Silver sky"
- Eurorock sonic seducer festival 2000 cd (Oblivion 2000) including "Nasty cloud"
- Dark feelings festival 2004 free sampler vol.1 cd (Dark feelings 2004) including "The last four days"
- W-Fest compilation 2018 cd (Wool-E discs 2018) including "Hide"
- A Wool-E Sampler 2018 cd (DWool-E discs 2018) including "From The Storms"
- Macadam Tribute cd (North Shadows Records 2018) Tribute to Bérurier Noir including "Tzigane"
- La Danse Macabre 8 digital (At Sea Compilations 2020) including "Inner Station" (Minimal Compact Cover)
- Implant Cognitve Dissonance CD (Alfa Matrix 2022) including “The Last Record” (Implant cover)
- B52 music club “locked in the dressing room” compilation (Rotator 2021) including “Kutná Hora”
- Psy'Aviah Rediscovered compilation 2022 (Alfa Matrix 2022) including “The Parts You can't see” (Psy'Aviah cover)
- Anthologies 3 compilation (Je m'en Fish 2022) including “The Dark Side”
- A Starnge Play vol 2 (Alfa Matrix & Spleen+ 2023) including “The Lovecats” The Cure cover
- Sounds From The Matrix (Alfa Matrix & Spleen+ 2026) including “Slowly Crashing”
- Recovery 2 For You Tribute to Front 242 (Alfa Matrix 2026) including “No Shuffle”

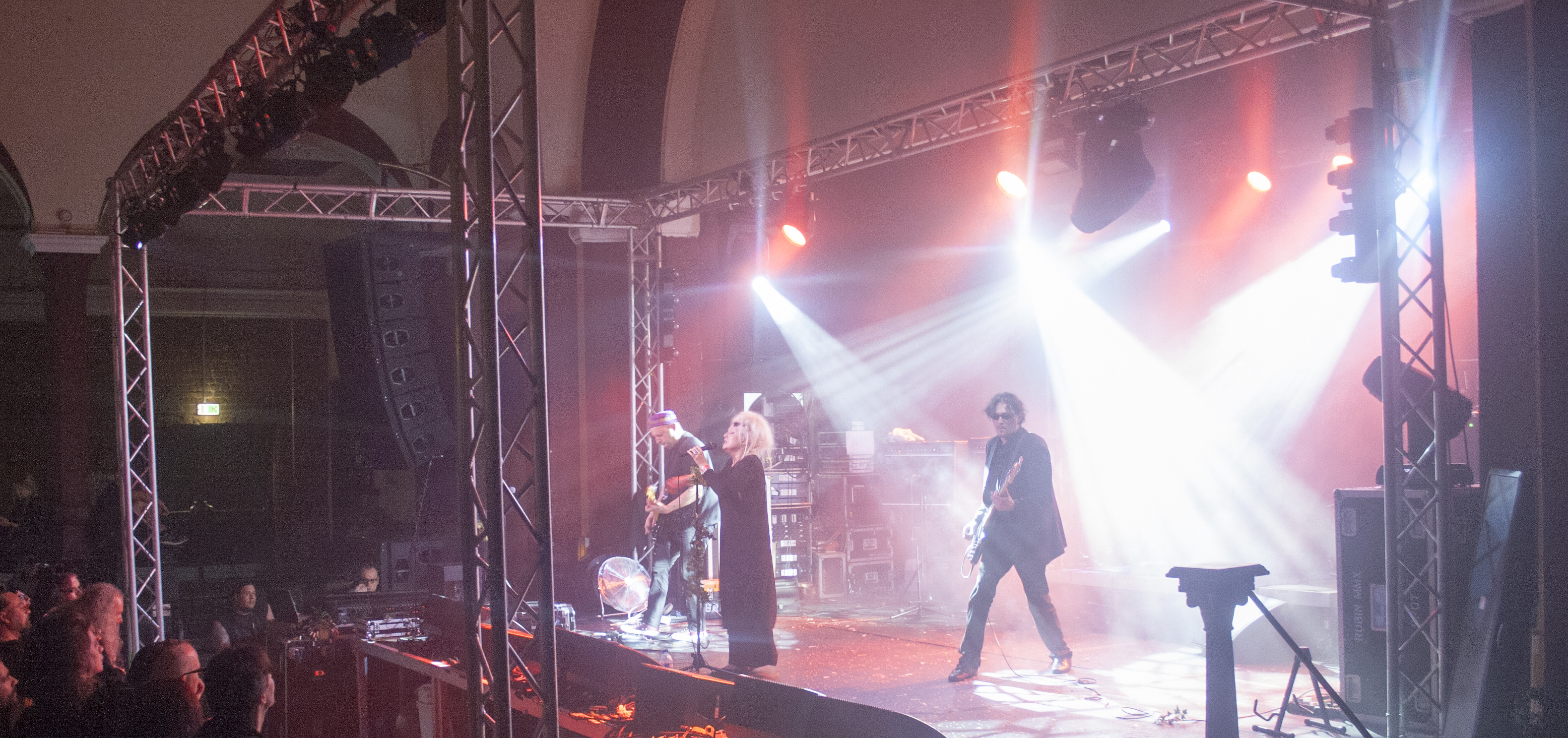
The Breath Of Life @ Wave Gothic Treffen (D) 2017

== Members ==
- From 1985 to 2000
  - Isabelle Dekeyser (Vocals), Philippe Mauroy (Guitar, programing), Giovanni Bortolin (Keyboards & violin), Benoît Sokay (Bass)
- From 2000 to 2014
  - Isabelle Dekeyser (Vocals), Didier Czepczyk (Guitar), Giovanni Bortolin (Keyboards & violin), Benoît Sokay (Bass), Marc Haerden (Drums)
- From 2015
  - Isabelle Dekeyser (Vocals), Didier Czepczyk (Bass), Philippe Mauroy (Guitar, programing), Giovanni Bortolin (Keyboards & violin)
