= Porl King =

British musician

Porl King (born 19 October 1967 on the Wirral Peninsula, United Kingdom) is a British musician.

He is the singer, songwriter and guitarist for the goth band Rosetta Stone from its inception in the late 1980s ; though its hiatus in 1998. Rosetta Stone re-emerged in the 2000s; with Porl as the only musician at times. As of 2025, Rosetta Stone, with Porl at the head, was going strong. Rosetta Stone albums with Porl still at the helm and current dates (2025) are widely available for purchase.

When Rosetta Stone was on hiatus; King began writing and recording his own material late in 2005 under the guise of miserylab. On 17 July 2007, miserylab released The Vaporware EP, consisting of four tracks, through Myspace.

In recent years, King has worked on a project called In Death It Ends.
