= Swarf (band) =

English electronic band from Brighton

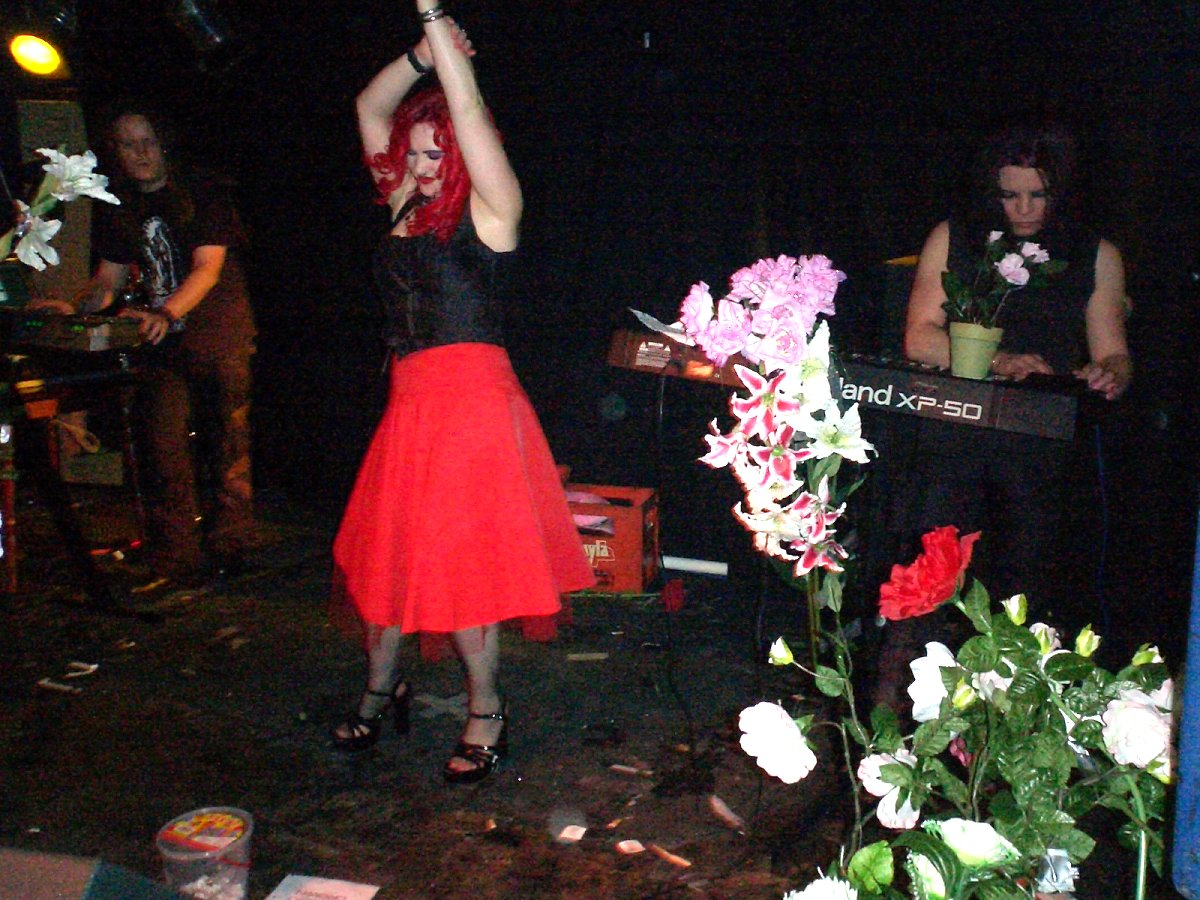

Background information
- Origin: Brighton, Sussex, England
- Labels: Wasp Factory
- Members: Liz Green; Andrew Stock; Chris Kiefer

Swarf were an English electronic band from Brighton, Sussex, England.

== Background ==
The lineup was Liz Green (vocals and lyrics), Andrew Stock (synths, programming) and Chris Kiefer (synths, programming). The band was formed in 2001 by Green and Stock, with Kiefer joining later.

After a 2004 UK tour with Ultravox veteran John Foxx the band released Art, Science, Exploitation, Swarf's first and only full album to date. Several tracks were produced by Marc Heal of Cubanate.

The band's original following stemmed from the goth and Industrial genres, but the band themselves never followed the scene's usual clichés. More recently, the group have moved away from their original audience and seem to have found a niche in the dance scene, featuring on several trance compilation albums. BBC South have also broadcast a live session.

== Discography ==
- Fall (CD single) (Wasp Factory, 2001)
- Art, Science, Exploitation (Cryonica, 2004)

=== Compilation albums ===
- Working With Children And Animals Vol 2 (Wasp Factory, 2002) – "Drown", "Shadows"
- Cryotank Vol 1 (Cryonica, 2003) – "Supine", "Grey (version)", "Subtext (Weirdo Bold Mix)"
- Interbreeding: Industrial Cyberlords (BLC Productions) – "Shadows"
- "Whirly Waves 3" Whirl-Y-Gig compilation album. "Subtext" (Weirdo mix)
