= Abbey Wharf Market =

Historic building in Whitby, North Yorkshire, England

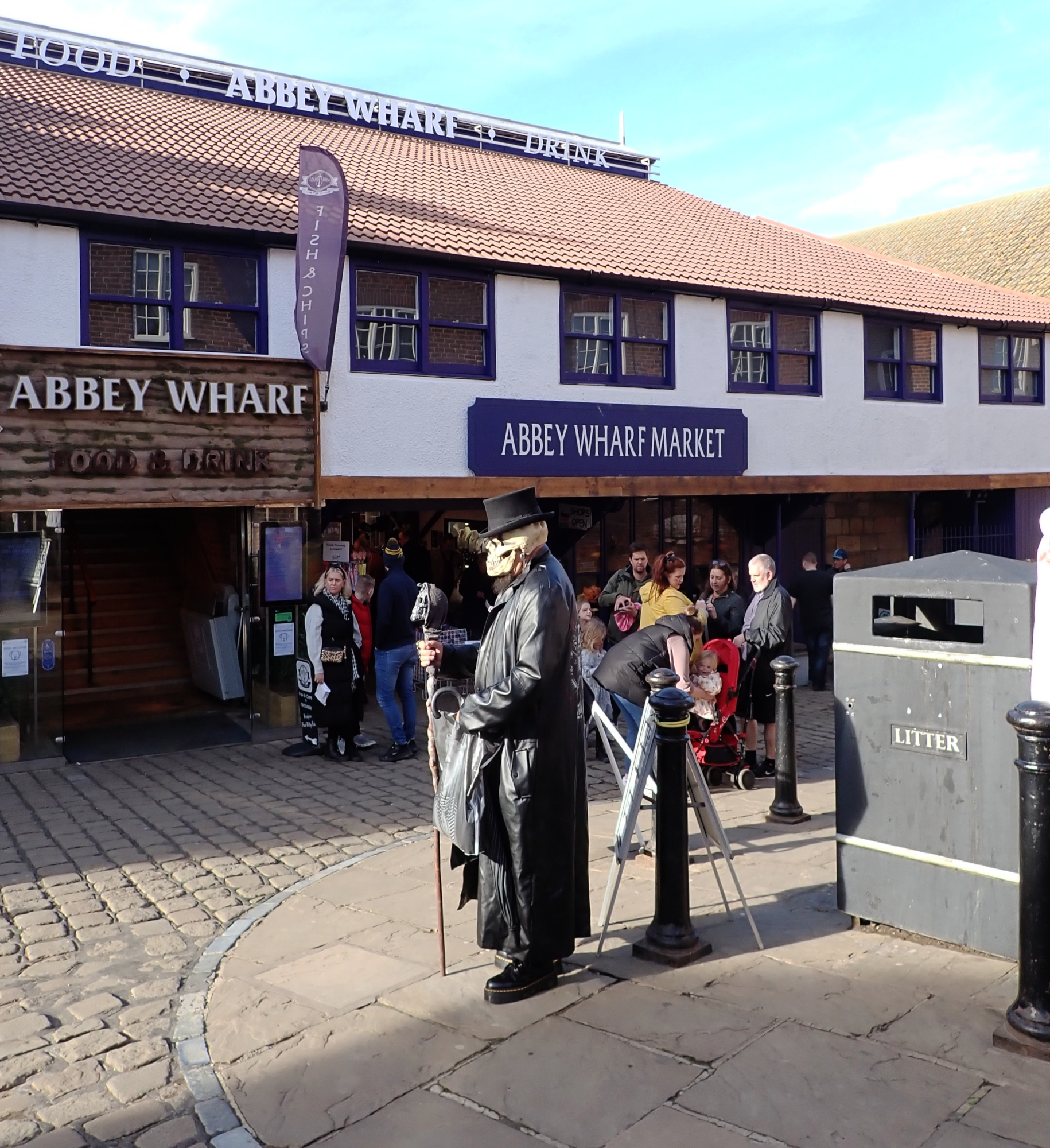
- The building in 2022

- Location within North Yorkshire

General information
- Location: Sandgate, Whitby, North Yorkshire, England
- Coordinates: 54°29′16″N 0°36′46″W
- Year built: Mid-19th century

Listed Building – Grade II
- Official name: Clothing factory
- Designated: 4 December 1972
- Reference no.: 1254057

Abbey Wharf Market (officially listed as Clothing factory) is a historic building on Sandgate in Whitby, a town in North Yorkshire, England.

The building was constructed in the mid-19th century, as an indoor market. It closed after the Second World War, and the building was purchased by Burberry and converted into a clothing factory. It was extended in the 1960s. This operated until 2001, after which it was converted into a craft centre, restaurant and a museum dedicated to the television programme Heartbeat. It later became an indoor market once more, with the restaurant continuing to operate on the upper floor. In 2023, it was reported as in being in poor condition, when an application to extend a mezzanine and construct a balcony were rejected. The building has been Grade II listed since 1972.

The building is rendered on a stone base, and has a hipped tile roof. It has two storeys, the upper storey overhanging on iron and wood supports, and is nine bays wide. The windows on the upper floor are sashes. There is a section in stone at right angles with two storeys and a modern asbestos roof.

== See also ==
- Listed buildings in Whitby (central area - east)
