= The Merry Thoughts =

German Gothic rock band

- The Merry Thoughts

Background information
- Origin: Germany
- Genres: Gothic rock
- Years active: 1983–2000
- Labels: Dion Fortune, SPV Oblivion
- Members: Marvin Arkham - Voice; Aldi Althaus - Guitar; The Thoughtmachine - Drums, Strings, Bass, Synthesizers
- Past members: Sonja Jordan - Guitar, Bass; Carsten Mainz - Guitar, Synthesizer; Olaf Wollschläger - Synthesizer, Drum Machine; Pino Eichhorn - Guitar

The Merry Thoughts are a German Gothic rock band based in Neuss.

== History ==
Carsten Mainz (guitar, synthesizer) and Olaf Wollschläger (synthesizer, drum machine) formed The Merry Thoughts in 1983 in Neuss, Germany. Marvin Arkham first joined on the synthesizer, later moving to vocals. Sonja Jordan also joined in late 1983 to play synthesizer before taking over guitar duties later.

By the early 90s, Olaf Wollschläger had left to pursue electronic music and Carsten Mainz left to form Behind the Scenes. Sonja Jordan and Marvin Arkham recorded a demo of 'Second Generation', one of the band's first songs which helped them land a label deal with Big Noise Records, a German independent label. Big Noise released 'Second Generation' in 1993 as The Merry Thoughts' first single. The band moved to Big Noise's subsidiary for gothic and darkwave music, Dion Fortune Records, where they released their second single, 'Pale Empress', and their debut album 'Millennium Done I: Empire Songs' (both released in 1993).

For their second album The Merry Thoughts moved to SPV, one of the largest independent record companies in the world. In 1996, SPV released 'Psychocult' on their Oblivion imprint. The album entered the German Alternative Charts Top Twenty where it would stay for more than two months.

Due to problems with their record company and the long process of recording, the band was basically destroyed after finishing 'Psychocult'.

Up until 2000 Sonja and Marvin still played live and continued to record and write new material. Sonja Jordan left the group in 2000 after their last concert at Albion New York City.

The band played a number of high-profile shows throughout Europe during their career, including an appearance at the Wave Gotik Treffen in Leipzig in 1995, and the Whitby Gothic Weekend in 1997.

According to Marvin Arkham, influences of The Merry Thoughts include David Bowie, Queen and Deutsch Amerikanische Freundschaft. The Merry Thoughts are often considered to be gothic-rock because of their great success in the 90s gothic-rock scene and uncanny similarity to The Sisters of Mercy. The band describes their music as 'counterpop'.

== Discography ==
=== Albums ===
- Millennium Done I: Empire Songs (1993)
- Psychocult: The Interim Versions (1996)

=== Singles and EPs ===
- "Pale Empress EP" (1993 - CD Maxi)
- "Second Generation" (1993 - CD EP)
- "Wires Hum" (2011 - CD Maxi)

=== Compilations ===
- Angel Child CD (M&A Music Art)
- New Alternatives 2 CD (Nightbreed Recordings)
- German Mystic Sound Sampler Vol. III CD (Zillo 1992)
- Dion Fortune Sampler Vol. 2 CD (Dion Fortune 1993)
- Andromeda - The Spectral Compilation CD (Discordia 1993)
- Dion Fortune Sampler Vol. 3 CD (Dion Fortune 1994)
- Touched By The Hand Of Goth CD (Sub Terranean 1995)
- Reconstruction Time CD (Khazad-Dum 1996)
- 2222 Tage CD (Dion Fortune 1997)
- Touched By The Hand Of Goth Vol. III CD (Sub Terranean 1997)
- Touched By The Hand Of Goth Vol. IV CD (Sub Terranean 1998)
- The Black Bible IV CD (Cleopatra 1998)
- Selections from the Black Bible CD (Cleopatra 1998)
