= Sunshine Blind =

- Origin: New Jersey, U.S.
- Genres: Gothic Rock
- Years active: 1991–2003, 2014, 2018, 2024-present
- Labels: Scream; Energy; Underground, Inc.
- Spinoffs: Fear Makes Perfect; Caroline Blind
- Members: Caroline Blind; CWHK
- Past members: Mark 27; Gregg Ziemba; Geoff Bruce; Cousin Al; J.T. Murphy

Sunshine Blind is an American goth/trip hop/darkwave band started in 1991 by CWHK and Caroline Blind. They released four albums before breaking up in 2003. In 2024 they reunited for live appearances, with new material released in 2025.

== History ==
Sunshine Blind was formed in New York/New Jersey area in 1991 by core members CWHK and Caroline Blind. In 1994 they launched a demo cassette, Sunshine Blind, and one year later they launched their first professional album, Love the Sky to Death, with Scream Records. The band moved to San Francisco in 1994 where they were reputed to have been removed from a gig by Andrew Eldritch of The Sisters of Mercy for allegedly looking "too goth."

The band played at the first three Convergence festivals between 1995 and 1997. In 1997 they launched a new album, Liquid, with Energy Records (of New York, not the Scandinavian label) and started to work in new songs.

In 1997 after many tours in the United States, Energy Records disappeared and Sunshine Blind couldn't find a new distributor. Caroline Blind recalled about those years: "Since we had a lot of bills and debts to pay, we had to live on day jobs for a while." Eventually they reunited to do a UK tour and started to work on a fourth CD. In 2003 they launched their new album, I Carry You, but then dissolved some months later.

The various band members drifted apart to work on their own projects and with other bands, but came together to play Convergence #20 in 2014 and again to play Convergence #24 in 2018.

== Legacy ==
Next project by most of the remaining members was Fear Makes Perfect, which never found its sound before it dissolved in October 2004. Caroline Blind, who participated in both bands, went solo under her own name.

== Discography ==
- Sunshine Blind (1994)
- Love the Sky to Death (1995)
- Liquid (1997)
- I Carry You (2003)

== Personnel ==
- Caroline Blind - Vocals, Guitar
- CWHK - Guitar
- Mark 27 - Bass
- Gregg Ziemba - Drums

Other members:

- Geoff Bruce - Drums
- Cousin Al - Bass
- J.T. Murphy - Bass
