= Die Laughing (band) =

British goth band

- Origin: Nottingham, England
- Genres: Gothic rock Alternative; Ethereal wave
- Years active: 1986–present
- Labels: Grave News; Cleopatra Records; Belle Antique
- Members: John Berry; Rachel Iden
- Past members: Allison Turner; Stuart Salt; Ian Fletcher; Ricki Martin; Ian Holman; Dave Shiner; Ruth Tyson; Mike Uwins; Bob Malkowski
- Website: Die Laughing on Facebook

Die Laughing are an English goth band formed in 1986 by John Berry.

Die Laughing are mainly remembered for their input to the 1990s goth scene with the classic lineup of Rachel Iden (formerly Rachel Speight) (vocals), John Berry (guitar) and Ian Holman (guitar). Between 1992 and 1999 this line-up went on to release several albums and headline major venues and festivals throughout the UK and Europe.

Mick Mercer said in his book Hex Files: The Gothic Bible what they have "which virtually every other UK act lacks, is this knowledge of melody and how to twist things into delightful forms". They were notable from their contemporaries because of the way they combined driving female vocals with hard edged gothic rock, a style typically dominated by male vocalists. Their unique and influential sound would lead them to become one of Britain's most popular gothic ethereal bands in the 1990s.

== History ==
=== 1986 to 1992 ===
Die Laughing's roots go back into the mid 1980s when the band was formed in Nottingham, UK by John Berry and vocalist Alison Turner. The name Die Laughing was chosen after Alison became hysterical with laughter during rehearsal. This line up was completed by bassist Stuart 'Rock God' Salt and Drummer Ian Fletcher, The band played a number of live shows with this original line up and recorded Two Demos - Insomnia (originally recorded for a 3 Track Single) & Wake, The title track "Wake" was Also re-recorded at Hemingbrough Hall Studios and featured on the rare compilation album "Underground Resistance" Shortly After this Ian Fletcher left and Was Replaced By Ricki 'baby face' Martin, The band split in 1988 after the release of their final 4 track demo "Of Hearts & Tears" when Alison left the band. Auditions were held but a new vocalist was not found and the band remained in hiatus until 1992.

=== 1992 to 1994 ===
In 1992, Berry met vocalist Rachel Iden and the second incarnation of Die Laughing was born. The pair began writing new tracks and further band members Dave Shiner and Ruth Tyson were recruited alongside a drummer to complete the live line up. The band recorded their first demo Poems of Your Life at Cage Studios in Sheffield which saw the group record four tracks from the first incarnation of the band. After purchasing a drum machine (Dr Duck), the band played their first live show on 12 February 1993, at The Narrow Boat venue in Nottingham.

The band's second demo Love Amongst The Ruins was recorded in March 1993. Extended touring around the UK during the summer of 1994 with Children On Stun followed, with the band making the decision to enhance the live sound with the addition of second guitarist, Ian Holman. Ian was felt by the band to complement the songwriting dynamic and joined as a permanent member later the same year. October 1994 saw the release of the three track Shadows & Silhouettes demo on cassette which was engineered by Matt Howden (Sieben).

=== 1995 to 1997 ===
Ian made his recording debut with Die Laughing on the band's final visit to Cage Studios in 1995 after the band had been approached by independent London label Grave News Ltd and Gothic Rock's Mick Mercer. Following critical acclaim within the genre media, and growing popularity on the live music circuit, the band recorded two new songs which appeared on two important and notable gothic rock compilations, "Harlequin" for the "Dreams in the Witch House" compilation (Grave News), and "Safe Little World" for Mick Mercer's Gothic Rock Volume 2: 80's into 90's compilation (Jungle Records), both released in 1995. During this time they were interviewed by the BBC World Service for their views on the goth music scene whilst playing a live show at The Marquee, London.

Die Laughing were now gaining worldwide fans and publicity, with the track "Nemesis" receiving regular club play in the goth venues of New York. The band was signed by Grave News 1995 and released a seven-track mini-album Glamour & Suicide which was notable in the fact that it sold out on pre-orders prior to release. The band chose to record the album at Purple Studios in Great Yarmouth which was owned and run by Richard Hammerton the vocalist of indie band Stare. Shortly after the album had been recorded it was announced that live keyboard player Ruth, and then a few months later bassist Dave, were both to leave the band due to work commitments.

The band were signed to Grave News in 1995 for a second full-length album and EP releases. In January 1996 the band returned to Purple Studios in Great Yarmouth to record Heaven in Decline. The band spent one week recording the 13 tracks but opted for a month break before returning to finish and mix the album. The album was released in May and saw Die Laughing embarking on a short tour of Germany with Vendemmian to promote the album in Europe. The album received positive coverage in mainstream rock/metal magazine Kerrang! and global goth underground magazines.

The band continued gigging throughout 1996 headlining the Marquee Club in London and playing The Drachma Club in Turin, Italy. At the same time, the band wrote a new single Queen of Swords which made its live debut in August at the Sacrosanct Festival at London Astoria where they played to a full house of 2000 people. They also made their first appearance at the Whitby Gothic Weekend. The album 'Heaven in Decline' had achieved significant sales in Japan on import which led Japanese label 'Belle Antique' to license a limited-edition version with the additional bonus rare track 'Plus ca Change' for this market only.

=== 1998 to 1999 ===
The Temptress EP (Queen of Swords) was recorded at The Vestry in Ealing, West London over the Christmas & New Year period 1996–97 but the recording was interrupted when Rachel was taken seriously ill and admitted to hospital with penicillin poisoning whilst in the studio. Once she had recovered the recording was completed, with the EP finally released later in the year alongside the album "Caged" which was a compilation of the band's discontinued 1992–1994 demo tapes.

In 1998 the band were approached by U.S label Cleopatra Records to release a compilation of Die Laughing album tracks together with 4 new unreleased tracks from the third album which the band had already begun to write. Incarnations (a retrospective) became the final album the band would release in the 1990s. In 1998 Die Laughing headlined the Whitby Gothic Weekend playing to over a thousand people. In the summer of 1999 Die Laughing played their final gig at London's The Borderline.

=== 1999 to 2012 ===
The band drew to a close in the summer of 1999, and the members moved onto new projects. Despite no longer being active, Die Laughing continued to grow their fanbase due to their tracks being featured on a number of compilations including an album which was notable as "a definitive look at some of darkwave/goth-rock's most innovating female performers". John co-founded in Isolation, Rachel became a fashion accessories designer/illustrator and musically, a member of Pretentious, Moi?. Ian continues to write music.

=== 2012 reunion ===
2012 saw the 20th anniversary of the second incarnation of Die Laughing featuring the core songwriting partnership of Iden and Berry now joined by Mike Uwins (of Manuskript on bass) and Bob Malkowski (previously of The Modern/Inertia on rhythm guitar). Their acclaimed first reunion show took place at Whitby Gothic Weekend on 28 April 2012. A new limited-edition single, "Tangled", was released to coincide with the festival.

== Discography ==
=== Albums ===
- Glamour & Suicide (CD, Grave News, Fetish 13, 1995)
- Heaven in Decline (CD, Grave News, Fetish 15, 1996)
- Heaven in Decline (Japanese only release with bonus track "Plus ca Change) (CD, Grave News/Belle Antique, Fetish 15/BELLE 96310, 1996)
- Caged (Demos 1992–1994) (CD, Grave News, Limited Edition, 1997)
- Incarnations (A Retrospective) (CD, Cleopatra Records, CLP-0438, 1998)

=== Singles and EPs ===
- "Queen of Swords" (7" vinyl, Numbered Limited Edition, Grave News, 1997)
- "The Temptress EP" (CD, Grave News, Fetish 17, 1997)
- "Tangled" (CD, Limited Edition, 2012)

=== Compilations ===
- Safe Little World Various – Gothic Rock 2 (3xLP / 2xCD, Comp) Jungle Records 1995
- Labyrinthine Various – New Alternatives II (CD, Comp) Nightbreed Recordings 1995
- Nemesis Various – Goth Box (4xCD, Comp) Cleopatra records 1996
- Firedance Various – The Sounds of New Hope (3xCD, Comp) Alice In... 1996
- Children (93 Version) Various – The Gothic Grimoire – Compilation 1/1996 (CD, Comp) Celtic Circle Productions 1996
- Garden of Thorns Various – Darkend – Gothic Rock Compilation Vol. 1 (2xCD, Comp) Darkend 1997
- Queen of Swords Various – The Black Book Compilation – Goths' Paradise (2xCD/Dig, Comp) Orkus 1998
- Invocation (Salome's Dream) Various – The Black Bible (4xCD, Comp) Cleopatra records 1998
- In Chimera's Shadow (Acoustic Version) Various – Kaleidoscope Issue 5 (CD, Comp) Kaleidoscope 1999
- Queen of Swords (Intravenous Mix) Various – Angels' Delight (2xCD, Comp) Zoomshot Media Entertainment 1999
- Firedance Various – This Is Goth! (3xCD, Comp) Cleopatra records 2000
- Nemesis Various – Gothic Divas (CD, Comp) Cleopatra records 2000
- Queen of Swords Various – Pagan Love Songs – Antitainment Compilation (2xCD, Comp) Alice In... 2004
- In Chimera's Shadow Various – Gothic Compilation Part XXXII (2xCD, Comp, Dig) Batbeliever Releases, Indigo (2) 2006
- Safe Little World Gothic Rock – The Ultimate Collection (5xCD, Comp + Box) Jungle Records 2008
- Malediction Various – Another Gift From Goth – 90's Gothic Rock Compilation (2xCD, Comp) Strobelight Records 2011
- Rusalka Various – Gotisch II (Cass, Comp) Bats And Red Velvet Unknown
- Heaven Various – Never Ending Alternatives (Cass, Comp) Nightbreed Recordings Unknown
