= Rico (Scottish singer) =

Scottish singer (1971–2022)

- Born: 23 June 1971; Paisley, Scotland
- Died: 16 August 2022 (aged 51) Govan, Glasgow, Scotland
- Genres: Industrial rock
- Instruments: Vocals, Guitar, Drums
- Years active: 1999–2022
- Labels: EMI/Chrysalis, Manufractured Records

Ricardo Capuano (23 June 1971 – 16 August 2022), better known as Rico, was a Scottish rock singer-songwriter.

== Life and works ==
Capuano was born in Paisley, Renfrewshire in 1971. He was the singer with the band Perfect World in the mid-1990s. Record company interest did not translate into a record deal, and he later went solo, recording as simply Rico.

His debut album Sanctuary Medicines was released by EMI/Chrysalis in 1999, and was described by the Glasgow Evening Times as being "as black as it was intense".

He supported Gary Numan on his UK tour in 2003, and had a hit with Numan in 2003 with "Crazier", which reached number 13 on the UK Singles Chart. Second album Violent Silences was released in 2004, and featured collaborations with Numan and Tricky.

Capuano produced a project by the band LUNG, a French/British duo with singer-guitarist Chris Loung and drummer-programmer Ric Chandler. The album, LUNG, was released in February 2013 on the American label octopus wreckords.

Starting in 2011, Rico was involved in Behind The Noise, a Glasgow-based music business education programme. The programme took young people through the music industry, including recording, production, promotion and live gigs at the Classic Grand. The project stopped running in 2019 after they were unable to secure funding.

Capuano died in Govan, Glasgow, on 16 August 2022. His death was announced by friend and collaborator Gary Numan.

== Discography ==
Albums

- Sanctuary Medicines (1999), EMI/Chrysalis
- Violent Silences (2004), Manufactured/Artful
