= Whitby Pavilion =

Theatre in Whitby, North Yorkshire, England

Coordinates: 54.4908°N 0.6197°W

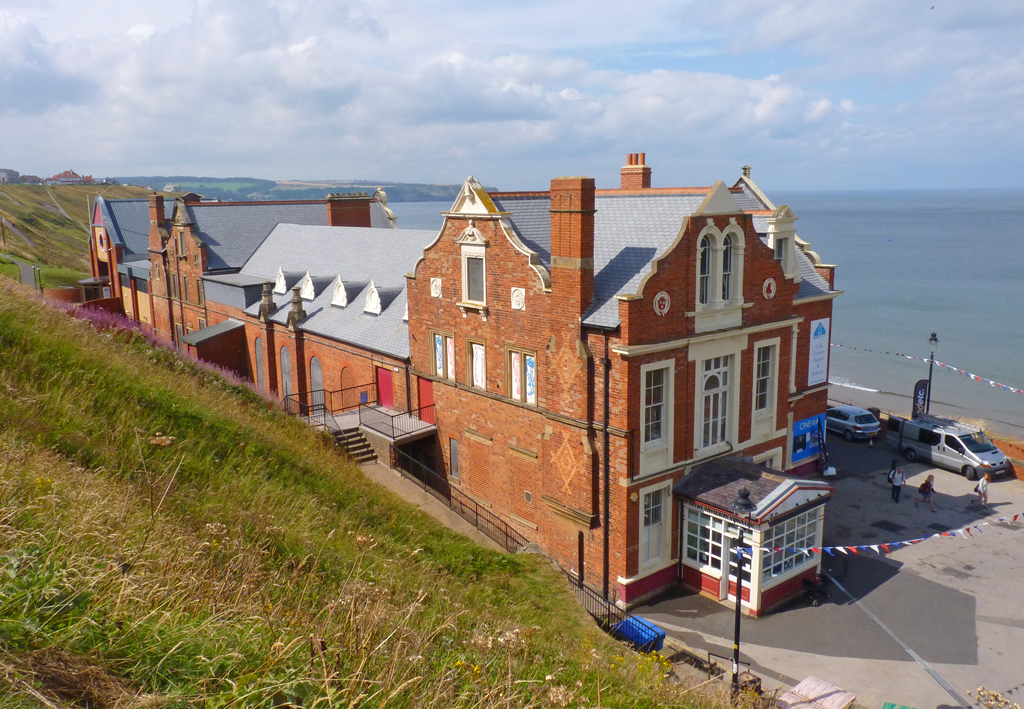
The building, from the cliffs, in 2013

The Whitby Pavilion is a theatre and events venue in Whitby, a town in North Yorkshire, in England.

The building was constructed between 1876 and 1879, on the initiative of George Elliott. It was designed as a theatre, with a saloon and surrounded by pleasure grounds. After World War I, a large extension was constructed, known as the Floral Hall, used primarily for dances. The hall became dilapidated, and was demolished in 1989. The theatre was renovated, and the Northern Lights Suite was constructed in 1990, providing a cafe, and space for exhibitions and markets. The theatre can now seat 380 people, and the stalls can be removed to create a dancefloor.

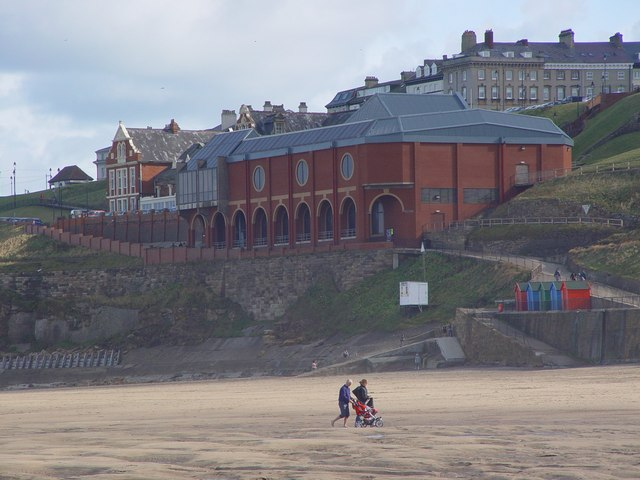
View from the beach, in 2007

Since 2011, the theatre has also been used as a cinema. In 2012, Scarborough Borough Council partnered with Sheffield International Venues to operate the premises, but this was terminated in 2020 as it proved unprofitable.

The building was designed by Julius Mayhew and Edward Smales in the Queen Anne style. It is described by Historic England as "a plain Victorian building of domestic appearance". The older section has a barrel vaulted ceiling.
