= Rosetta Stone (band) =

English gothic rock band

- Origin: England
- Genres: Gothic rock, post-punk, alternative rock, darkwave
- Years active: 1988–1998, 2019–present
- Labels: Cleopatra Records; Expression Records; Minority / One Records; DEppressION Records; Futurity Records
- Members: Porl King
- Past members: Karl North; Porl Young

Rosetta Stone are an English gothic rock band formed in the 1980s by Porl King (guitar/vocals/keyboards) and Karl North (bass), plus their drum machine and synthesizer rack nicknamed "Madame Razor".

The band is named after the Rosetta Stone, an Egyptian historical artifact, and the band used much ancient mythological imagery, especially in their earlier work.

Their early style and first album reflected the jangly-guitar sounds of 1980s gothic rock, and their first big break came after live gigs supporting the then already well-established band The Mission. The band then moved to a more electronic sound before disbanding in 1998.

After time spent on different music projects, new Rosetta Stone material appeared in 2019, 2020, 2024, and 2025.

== History ==
After playing live gigs around Liverpool and then nationally from 1988 onwards and releasing several independently produced singles to increasing popularity, Rosetta Stone recorded their first full-length album, An Eye for the Main Chance, releasing it in 1991. They also recruited Porl Young as a second guitarist and toured extensively to promote the album.

Following on from this, the band released their most successful single, the 12" Adrenaline. Porl Young subsequently left the band to produce Children on Stun whilst Porl King and Karl North released a cover version of The Rattles' 1970 hit The Witch.

The band went on to sign a US record and distribution deal with Cleopatra Records who released much of their early cassette and vinyl singles and EPs in 1993 as an album under the title Foundation Stones, and a CD album Adrenaline which, along with the title track, also featuring earlier singles such as An Eye for the Main Chance and The Witch. In the UK they released a CD album (on Minority One) entitled On The Side Of Angels, compiling previous vinyl singles and their various remixes.

Using the advance money for 1995's The Tyranny of Inaction, Porl King purchased an Alesis ADAT multi-track digital recorder, the use of which substantially changed Rosetta Stone's sound. That album and most subsequent work featured a much more industrial/electronic sound, with extensive use of sampling.

Following an accident in late 1997, Porl King lost part of his left little finger, which changed his guitar style considerably.

The band split in 1998 after releasing Chemical Emissions and a radical remix of Tyranny as a limited release CD gENDER cONFUSION and playing a final headlining live performance at the Whitby Gothic Weekend festival in October that year. Karl North went on to join the already-established UK band, the Dream Disciples.

Porl King produced one more album (contractually) of 80s new romantic cover versions under the name Rosetta Stone for Cleopatra Records. He then went on to work on other projects. Rosetta Stone was presumed to have finished as a band.

In May 2019, Rosetta Stone, still consisting solely of Porl King, released a new album Seems Like Forever on Cleopatra Records, which included some new material plus songs previously released under Porl's Miserylab project re-recorded with more of Rosetta's signature guitar sound. The album was mixed by Jürgen Engler of Die Krupps. A video was released to promote the track "Tomorrow For Us".

A further full-length album, Cryptology, was released in August 2020. Consisting completely of new material, it continued the social commentary of Seems Like Forever, tackling issues such as Brexit, racism and austerity in the UK.

== Members' related works ==
Porl King wrote and produced his own music throughout the 2000s and early 2010s under the name Miserylab. King also operated as a remixer and producer, working for the likes of the Mercury Music Award -nominated Elbow and the Fluke side-project Syntax.

In the 2010s, King worked on the solo project In Death It Ends. The dark, foreboding nature of this project abandons prior interest in politics, and is connected with the witch house scene. Porl returned to release a new album under the Rosetta Stone name in 2019.

The Dream Disciples (Karl North) ceased to be active after their performance at Whitby Gothic Weekend in April 2004.

Young was resident DJ at Heaven in London. He is co-owner of the Tuff Twins label, and has produced and mixed several club tunes.

== Discography ==
=== Studio albums ===
- An Eye for the Main Chance (1991)
- The Tyranny of Inaction (1995)
- Chemical Emissions (1998)
- Seems Like Forever (2019)
- Cryptology (2020)
- Under the Weather (2024)
- Dose Makes the Poison (2025)
- Executing Nostalgia (2026)

=== Cover albums ===
- Unerotica (2000)
- Nothing is Sacred (2025)

=== Live albums ===
- Under the Rose (1991)

=== Compilation albums ===
- On the Side of Angels (1993)
- Adrenaline (1993)
- Foundation Stones (1993)
- Anthology 1988-2012 (2020)
- Demos and Rare Tracks 1987-1989 (2022)

=== Singles and EPs ===
- Darkness and Light (1989)
- Leave Me for Dead (1991)
- An Eye for the Main Chance (1991)
- Adrenaline (1992)
- The Witch (1992)
- Epitome E.P. (1993)
- Nothing (1994)
- Hiding in Waiting (1996)
- Tomorrow for Us (2019)

=== Demos and fan club releases ===
- Recreate and Emulate (1988, cassette only)
- Whispers (1988, cassette only)
- Chapter and Verse (1988, cassette only)
- Retribution (1989, cassette only)
- And How They Rejoice (1989, cassette only)
- Gender Confusion (1998, CD)

=== Tribute albums ===
- Shout at the Remix: A Tribute to Mötley Crüe (Cleopatra Records, 2000)
- Don't Blow Your Cover: A Tribute to KMFDM (2000)
- A Tribute to Tool (Cleopatra Records, 2002)
- We Will Follow: A Tribute to U2 (Cleopatra Records, 1999)

=== Project albums ===
As Complicity (featuring members of Vendemmian, Altered States with production and keys/additional vocals from Rosetta Stone under the moniker wHATEver pRODUCTIONS) Playing God (17 March 1997; CD album; UK, Grave News Limited - Catalog# FETISH 16)
