= Big Electric Cat =

Australian gothic rock band

- Origin: Sydney, New South Wales, Australia
- Genres: Gothic rock; post-punk; dark wave
- Years active: 1993–present
- Members: Paul Sadler; David Block; Deborah Denton; Dr. Ruth
- Past members: Pre 1993: Ian Williams, Michael Jordan, Bernie Decasanova, Darren Evans; Post 1993: William Jackson, Damien Gillette

Big Electric Cat is a gothic rock group from Sydney, Australia, formed by musicians Paul Sadler and Deborah Denton, who had moved from London to Sydney in 1989. In 1991, inspired by Philip K. Dick's sci-fi novel Do Androids Dream of Electric Sheep? and the future noir movie Blade Runner, and inspired by the film's dark, futuristic, and other themes, they formed Big Electric Cat.

In 1993 they were joined by drummer Scott Charaneka and local bassist David Block. After Scott's departure, live drumming was dropped in favour of a drum machine named "Dr. Ruth" after the famous sex therapist Dr. Ruth; thus the band's sound was born.

After sell-out gigs across Australia and the resurgence of the gothic scene, the band recorded their 4-track demo "Suspira." After several attempts to get signed to an Australian record label, they sent a demo to the newly formed Goth label Cleopatra Records in Los Angeles, and were immediately offered a three-album deal.

The band's first full album was titled "Dreams of a Mad King" and was released in 1994. Recorded at Damien Gerrard Studios in Sydney and engineered by Russ Pilling it featured the hits "Christabel", "Orchid Dreaming", "Paris Skies", and "Red Roses" which defined their sound. At the suggestion of Cleopatra Records label boss Brian Perera, their second release, in October 1995, was the seven-track remix EP Burning Embers, overseen by Q/Überzone/Death Method.

In 1997 the band embarked on the 40-city "Congregation Tour" of the US with labelmates Christian Death and Switchblade Symphony. On their return to Australia, Denton left the band while Sadler and Block continued to write and record the second full-length album, Eyelash. Recorded at Powerhouse Studios, Sydney, and released in August 1997, the songs took a darker, electronic journey; the title track "Eyelash" was dedicated to Sadler's father, who had recently died.

With more live commitments and increasing popularity William Jackson was recruited for live keyboard duties, and when David Block quit unexpectedly later that year, he was replaced by Damien Gillette on bass.

== Line-up ==
=== Current members ===
- Paul Sadler - vocals, guitars
- Changeling - bass, keyboards (2000–present)
- Rainey Daye - guitar, keyboards (2000–present)
- Dr. Ruth - drums

=== Former members ===
- Deborah Denton - keyboards, backing vocals
- David Block - bass
- William Jackson - keyboards
- Damien Gillett - bass

== Releases ==
- Suspira (1993, 4-track demo)
- Dreams of a Mad King (1994)
- Burning Embers (1995, remix EP)
- Eyelash (1997)

=== Tracks featured on compilations ===
- Gothic Rock Vol2
- The Black Bible 1998 (Cleopatra Records)
- Vampire Themes (Cleopatra Records)
- The Goth Anthology (Cleopatra Records 2006)
- Gothik (Cleopatra Records 2006)
- Art of Gothic (Talitha Records 1994)
- In Goth Daze (Cleopatra Records 1994)
- Gothic Rock 2 (Jungle Records UK 1995)
- Gothik: Music From The Dark Side (Cleopatra Records 1995)
- New Alternatives II (Nightbreed Recordings UK 1995)
- Goth Box (Cleopatra Records 1996)
- Goth's Undead (Cleopatra Records 1997)
- Songs To Wake The Dead (Black Rat Recordings 1997)
- Vampire Themes (Cleopatra Records 1997)
- Gothspotting (Cleopatra Records 1998)
- The Black Bible (Cleopatra Records 1998)
- Goth Oddity - A Tribute To David Bowie (Cleopatra Records 1999) Cover version of Cat People (Putting Out Fire) originally by David Bowie/Giorgio Moroder
- Gothic Maladies (Cleopatra Records 1999)
- Zillo Mystic Sounds 8 (Zillo Germany 1999)
- Dancing on Your Grave (Cleopatra Records 2003)
- The Goth Anthology (Metro Triples 2006)
- This is Gothic-The Batcave Anthology (Cleopatra Records 2006)
- Horror Themes (2007 Big Eye Records)
- Music Inspired by Twilight( 2008 Big Eye Music)
- Alternative Club Hits of the 80's and 90's (Cleopatra Records 2009)

=== DVDs ===
- Gothic Industrial Alternative Visuals DVD (Cleopatra Records 2006)
- Goth - The Ultimate Collection (2007 DVD Warner Vision Australia/Cleopatra Records)

== See also ==
- List of Gothic rock bands
