= Children on Stun =

English gothic rock band

- Origin: England
- Genres: Gothic rock, deathrock
- Years active: 1991–1998, 2015-present
- Members: Neil Ash / Kyle Whipp
- Past members: Simon Treen; Simon Manning; Stuart Harper; Pete Finnemore; Gordon Young
- Website: http://www.childrenonstun.uk/

Children on Stun is the name of an English gothic rock band. Formed in 1991, the original line-up consisted of Neil Ash, Simon Manning, Peter Finnemore and Simon Treen.

== Biography ==
Formed in August 1991 and taking their name from a song by the band The March Violets. Treen left within a year of the band forming. The band's first gig took place at a club called "The Crypt" in Hastings. In the same year, the band also recorded their first demo, entitled "Elegance", and also made an appearance in Mick Mercer's second book on the gothic rock genre.

In 1992, the band supported the popular goth rock band Rosetta Stone on their UK tour. Later on that year, they released their second demo, "Choices".

The band went on to release two more demos in 1993, entitled "Monochrome I" and "Monochrome II". They used the profits from these demos to release their first single, "Hollow". The band secured a record contract with Cleopatra Records in 1994 and released the album Tourniquets of Love's Desire. This album was well received within the UK goth scene and boosted the band's popularity.

"Towards the end of the year, the band was approached by the label M&A and asked to produce an EP. This resulted in the Overland EP being released."

In the summer of 1994 Pete Finnemore left the band. Neil and Simon played several shows as a two-piece, with the bass guitar on a backing track, and Simon as the sole guitarist. Kyle Whipp (formerly of Soul Inside) joined the band as their new bass player and they played their first show with this new line up in 1995 at London's Camden Underworld. The EP Celebration Drug was released later on in the year and included the track "Whiskey a-go-go". In August of the same year, the band went on a tour of Scandinavia. As well as this, the band released another EP titled Celibacy and Anadin which included remixes by Rosetta Stone. After the release of this EP, the band ended their contract with Cleopatra.

In 1996, the band began to record their new album, Mondo Weird, which was not released until 1997. The band also released the single "Pin ups, Soap Operas and Natural Disasters" in this year.

A remix LP called Outrageous, Outlawed, Outspoken was released by M&A in 1998: during the same year, the band announced that they would be splitting up. They played their final gig at the Camden Underworld on 24 May 1998. Resurrection Records also released a CD of this gig, entitled Seven Year Itch.

In 2005, M&A released a compilation called Rough Trade on a Cheap Promotion, featuring the band's b-sides, alternate song versions and demos.

On 15 May 2015, Children on Stun played a reunion gig at the o2 Academy2 in Islington, London and within a few weeks announced they would be reforming. On 4 July 2015, Simon Manning died in his sleep from a heart attack. On 24 October the Stun had a charity fundraising birthday party in memory of Manning. They were joined by his long term bandmate and friend Stuart Harper [Felo-De-Se] who stood in his place. Also paying tribute were Vendemmian, whom Manning had joined for a short time and The Last Cry a favourite band of Manning's, giving their services for free. The money raised was split between the British Heart Foundation and the Sophie Lancaster Foundation. Dancing with Mr Punch a strictly limited edition CD of 100 copies, compiled by John D'Anter, containing all four early studio demos on CD was made available to attendees of the birthday memorial gig with the proceeds also going to charity.

The band decide to continue with Stuart Harper joining permanently on guitar. On 22 October 2016, a second charity event [The Birthday Bash 2] was organized in their hometown of Hastings in memory of Manning. That same night a limited edition CD, This Sideshow Burlesque was released first to all attendees. Only 100 hand-numbered copies were pressed with all profits from the release going to two heart charities. The track-list contained rare live tracks from the band's early career.

In 2017, after headlining the Gotham Sounds Festival in Germany and during the recording of new material, the band announced they would be splitting up again. The following year, the group made a surprise return at the Hope & Anchor in Islington, London on 4 May. The band recorded two new songs "All the Pain of Love" and "Echoes" at Savage Sounds Studio, Hastings, as part of a planned Mini-LP. In June 2018, Harper left the band and, in September 2018, Ex-Dream Disciples guitarist Gordon Young joined the group. In December that year, Children on Stun sign to Armalyte Industries.

In March 2019, Echoes a five track EP of new material was released with Gordon Young producing. The track "Another Love, Another Beginning" was originally written by Whipp/Ash as part of a planned but unrecorded, second Stripper Project album.

The band played their final live date on 1st Sept 2023 in New York at the Bowery Ballroom as part of the Murder of Crows festival.

February 2025 Whipp & Ash recorded 'Living Fractures' & 'Made for you' at Ford Lane Studio in Arundel with producer, 'Porl Young'. The band was again put on ice with no further plans to continue.

== After the original split ==
Manning formed Spares in 1999 with Alison Gann. Whipp and Ash formed The Stripper Project with Hannah Neech in 2007.

2008 saw the release of an official DVD entitled Bootleg Television, comprising three hours of archive footage from the band's personal archives, compiled by filmmaker D/Evil. Included is the band's final concert in Camden, a 45-minute rockumentary of the 'Mondo Tour', three unreleased tracks with unseen footage, a stills gallery, a rare Norwegian television interview, three songs from the band's Scandinavian tour plus a remastered copy of the rarely seen Celebration video. Only 100 are made and marked "limited edition" and signed by the band.

Manning joined Grooving in Green in 2009.

== Spares ==
Since its incarnation, Simon Manning and Alison Gann released several albums and EPs, and been joined by various musicians, including Jamie Smith (Libitina) and Kyle Whipp (Children on Stun/Stripper Project).

=== Discography ===
- Tired & Bizarre CD album, 2000, M&A Music Art
- End of the Line EP, 2001, M&A Music Art
- Download CD, 2003, Black Planet
- Suffering Fools Gladly CD, 2004, Black Planet
- Half Light Zone CD, 2006, Signet Records
- After-Life three track EP (internet only release, 2008)
- Beautiful Liar, 2009

== The Stripper Project ==
Whipp and Ash formed The Stripper Project with Hannah Neech in late 2007. In 2008 the outfit released two singles. "Reasons Not to Go to Work" [Be Yourself and Mean It, Punch Drunk Love, Smiling Judas] was recorded at Arundel's Pilot Sounds studio in January 2008 and was produced by Porl Young. "Filthy Wonderful" [Filthy Wonderful, Kill La Shoes]. was recorded in April 2008 again at Pilot Sounds studio with Young. Originally another track, "Born to Lose", was recorded at the same time but never used. Also of note, Filthy Wonderful is a tribute to artist and pioneer transsexual, Lili Elbe.

In 2009, Hannah Neech left the project. A ten track debut album Brilliant Life was released on 29 October 2010. In review, author and music writer Mick Mercer, [Gothic Rock book/Hex Files] included Brilliant Life in his albums of the year. In 2013, Danny Tartaglia joined the project on bass.

With the reunion of Children on Stun on 15 May 2015, the band is left on ice with a planned second album written but unrecorded.

== Members ==
- Simon Manning - bass and guitars (1991–1998, 2015)
- Simon Treen - drums (1991)
- Kyle Whipp - bass and guitars (1995–1998, 2015-)
- Neil Ash - vocals, keyboards and drums (1991–1998, 2015- )
- Pete Finnemore - Guitar (1991 - 1994)
- Stuart Harper - guitar (2015 - 2018)
- Gordon Young - guitar (2018 - 2024)

== Discography ==
- Elegance (1991) 3 Track Demo Tape
- Choices (1992) 4 Track Demo Tape
- Monochrome I (1993) 4 Track Demo Tape
- Monochrome II (1993) 4 Track Demo Tape
- Hollow (1993) 4 Track Vinyl EP
- Tourniquets of Loves Desire (1994) CD Album
- Overland EP (1994) CD Album
- Celibacy & Anadin (1995) CD EP
- Celebration Drug (1995) CD Single
- Mondo Weird (1997) CD Album
- Pin Ups, Soap Operas and Natural Disasters (1997) CD Single
- Outrageous, Outlawed, Outspoken (1998) Vinyl Picture Disc Remix Album
- Seven Year Itch (1998) CD Live Album of The Stuns Last Stand
- Rough Trade on a Cheap Promotion - Rare Stuff (2006) CD Album
- Bootleg Television (2008) Limited Edition of 100 DVD
- Dancing with Mr Punch Limited Edition CD (2015)
- This Sideshow Burlesque Limited Edition CD (2016)
- Echoes 5 track EP (2019)
