= Suspiria (band) =

British rock band

- Origin: Nottingham, England
- Genres: Gothic rock, dark wave
- Years active: 1993–1998
- Labels: Nightbreed, Cleopatra
- Past members: Matthew Carl Lucian; Mark Tansley

Suspiria were an English darkwave/gothic rock band. Formed in Nottingham in 1993, the line-up consisted of vocalist Matthew Carl Lucian and guitarist and programmer Mark Tansley.

== History ==
Although initially formed in late 1993 as a guitar-driven fourpiece band, the band would later become primarily active as a duo, marking a decisive break in the UK goth music scene from The Sisters of Mercy-influenced guitar rock that had dominated the scene. Drawing on late 1970s techno experimentalists such as Cabaret Voltaire and The Human League, and the early 1980s synthesizer sound of artists such as Depeche Mode and Alphaville, Suspiria fused crisp electronics with heavily effected guitars to produce a much more dancefloor-orientated sonic backdrop to the melodramatic vocal stylings of frontman Lucian.

The 1994 release of the debut Tragedy E.P. on the Nottingham label, Nightbreed Recordings, led to widespread international club and radioplay and established Suspiria as one of the most sought after bands in the underground goth scene. This was followed up with the 1995 album, The Great and Secret Show, which featured a number of tracks that would become major club hits, including "Night Time" and a haunting cover of Depeche Mode's "Behind the Wheel".

Suspiria had by this point become one of the leading underground UK goth bands with a series of live performances in the UK and in Europe, and a promotional campaign based on the sale of a wide selection of affordable T-shirt designs further broadening their audience base during 1995 and 1996.

Without question the high point for the band, and in many respects for the UK goth scene in the 1990s, was the second full-length album, Drama. Recorded over the period of nearly a year and at what was then considered great cost for an underground artist, Drama was released in 1997 to widespread acclaim. A number of live festival performances and compilation appearances supported Drama, which went on to become the single biggest selling album in Nightbreed's history. The success of the band in Europe finally began to filter through to the United States, where the guitar rock sound had persisted much longer. Leading US goth label Cleopatra Records released a re-mastered combination of the Tragedy E.P. and The Great and Secret Show in 1997 entitled Primitive Attentions, followed in 1998 with the Dancefloor Tragedy: The Best of Suspiria.

Internal tensions during the recording of Drama however had begun to take its toll on the band, with Lucian in particular suffering nervous attacks at shows in Paris and London. The band played a final live show at the 1998 Carnival of Souls festival to a packed out crowd.

== Current status ==
Lucian dropped out of music entirely after Suspiria split and appears to have pursued a career in art.

Tansley went on to provide a number of remixes for Cleopatra whilst also forming a new band, Intra-Venus, with vocalist Apollos. Intra-Venus extended the electronic sound of Suspiria with the heavily dance-infused synthpop and E.B.M. that had come to dominate the dark underground in the early 2000s. After two releases and a smattering of high-profile live performances Intra-Venus broke up in 2003.

In January 2008, Tansley reworked the club hit "Allegedly, Dancefloor Tragedy", with vocals provided by Subterfuge frontman Clifford Ennis.

== Band members ==
- Matthew Carl Lucian – Vocals
- Mark Tansley – Guitars and programming

== Discography ==
=== Studio releases ===
- Tragedy E.P. – (Nightbreed, 1993)
- The Great and Secret Show – (Nightbreed, 1995)
- Drama – (Nightbreed, 1997)
- Primitive Attentions – (Cleopatra, 1997)
- Dancefloor Tragedy: The Best of Suspiria – (Cleopatra, 1998)
