= Mick Mercer =

British journalist and writer

Michael Mercer
- Born: 19 July 1957
- Occupations: Photographer, author, journalist
- Known for: Goth subculture

Mick Mercer (born Michael Mercer, 19 July 1957) is a journalist and author best known for his books, photographs and reviews of the goth and punk scenes.

== Life and work ==
Mercer is primarily a writer focused on the gothic rock scene that emerged from the initial post-punk era in the late 1970s and early 1980s. He has also photographed bands from the Punk era onwards, publishing a monthly online magazine, The Mick, for over ten years. Mercer now hosts a weekly live internet radio show, Mick Mercer Radio, as well as providing daily reviews and/or photo galleries in his online newsletter, Mick Mercer's Panache, now largely shared in ongoing fashion via subscription-based publishing platform Substack, with which he continues to cover contemporary post-punk acts and culture.

Mercer ran one of the first punk fanzines, Panache, from 1976 to 1992. In 1978, he began writing for British music paper Record Mirror, then freelanced for ZigZag magazine, later becoming its editor until the magazine folded in 1986. During the 1980s, he wrote regularly for the British music weekly Melody Maker, and edited Siren magazine in the 1990s. He has written five books on gothic music, in addition to numerous self-published material.

Mercer's Music to Die For compendium (2009) was described by The Quietus as having "a far greater stylistic variety than the casual observer might imagine", and as being "stuffed full of the best and most artistic music the world has to offer".

In 2023, some of Mercer's photographs were exhibited as a part of "The Batcave Exhibition" at the Museum of Youth Culture on Berwick Street in Soho. The journalist's important - predominantly goth-based - photo archive may be sampled at this page on the Redbubble website:

== Bibliography ==
- Mercer, Mick (1988). Gothic Rock Black Book. Omnibus Press. ISBN 0-7119-1546-6
- Mercer, Mick (1991). Gothic Rock: All You Ever Wanted to Know...but Were Too Gormless to Ask. Pegasus Publishing. ISBN 1-873892-01-2
- Mercer, Mick (1997). Hex Files: The Goth Bible. Overlook Press; First American edition. ISBN 0-87951-783-2
- Mercer, Mick (2002). 21st Century Goth. Reynolds & Hearn. ISBN 1-903111-28-5
- Mercer, Mick (2009). Music to Die For. Cherry Red Books. ISBN 978-1-901447-26-2

== Discography ==
The second and third books spawned a series of CD compilations, with detailed sleeve notes provided by Mercer.

- Gothic Rock, (double CD)
- Gothic Rock 2, September 1995 (double CD)
- Gothic Rock 3: Black on Black, (double CD)
- Hex Files—The Goth Bible Vol. 1, 1997 (double CD)
- Hex Files—The Goth Bible Vol. 2, (double CD)
- Hex Files—The Goth Bible Vol. 3, 1998 (double CD)
