= Uvula (band) =

Popular Russian dreampop band

Uvula Увула
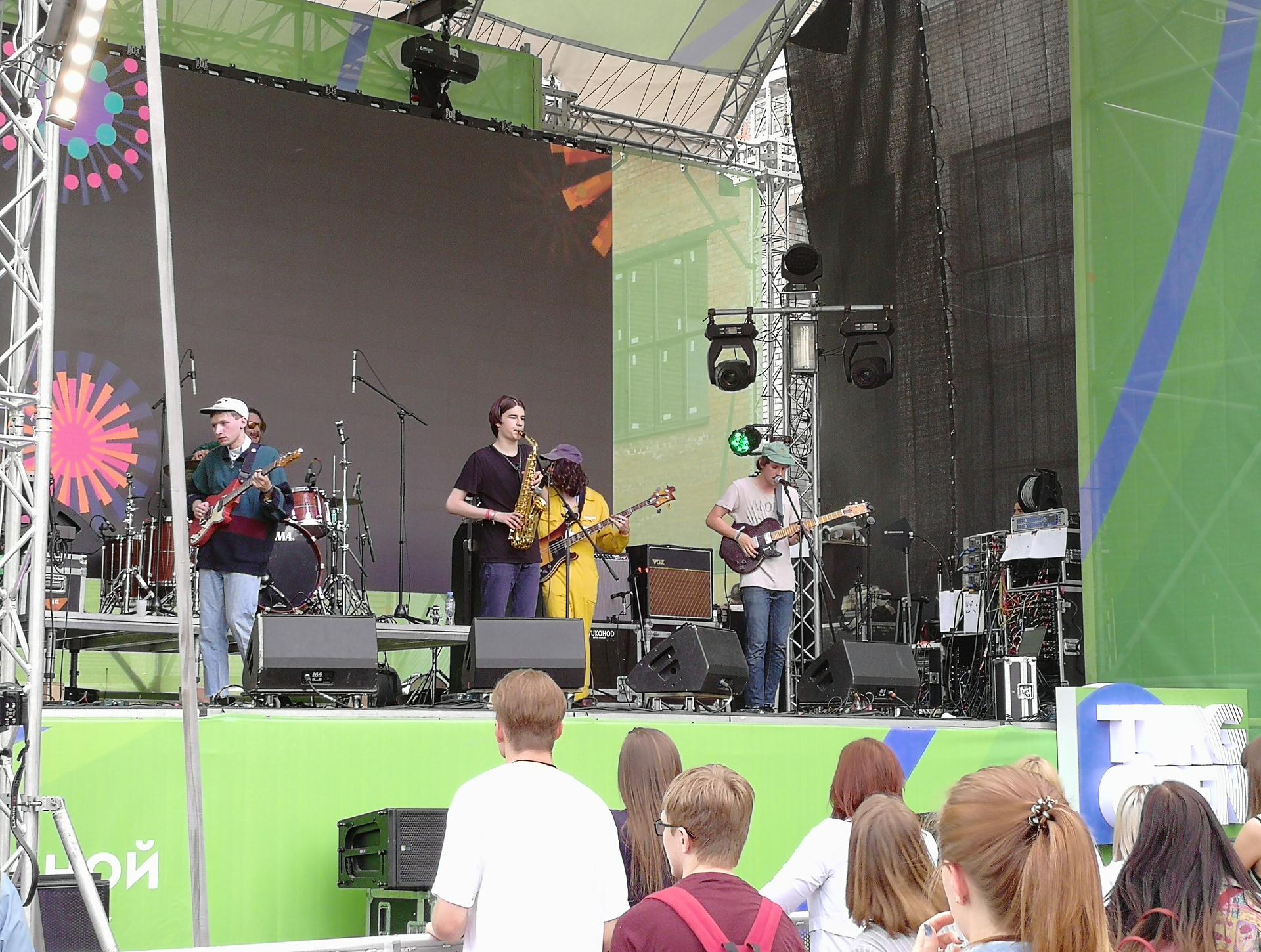
- Uvula performing at Stereoleto in St. Petersburg (2018)

Background information
- Origin: St. Petersburg, Russia
- Genres: Indie-rock, dreampop, shoegaze, surf rock
- Years active: 2015-2022, 2025-present
- Labels: None, (previously) Homework
- Spinoffs: Nami; Lek
- Spinoff of: Fleece flower
- Members: Aleksey Avgustovsky (vocals and guitar); Aleksandr Smirnov (guitar); Denis Shilovsky (drums), Artemy Shilo (bass guitar); Roma Kuzankin (keyboard)
- Past members: Aleksandr Tovarishchev (keyboard)
- Website: https://uvula.bandcamp.com/

Uvula (Russian: Увула) is a Russian indie-rock band from St. Petersburg, founded in 2015 by frontman Aleksey "Lek" Avgustovsky and guitarist Aleksandr Smirnov. According to Avgustovsky, in 2023, they were put on a performing blacklist in Russia and were prohibited from playing concerts at large venues. The group announced its disbandment in November 2022. [26] However, it resumed its activity in 2025.

== Background ==
The name of the band was chosen by Avgustovsky; it comes from a cyrillicization of the (Latin-derived) English word uvula. In an interview with The Flow, Avgustovsky recalled hearing the word while in a class at university.

Because Uvula is a loan word in Russian, there is some confusion about its pronunciation. Though the band members place stress on the second vowel (i.e. Russian: Уву́ла, romanized: Uvúla), they have also said that they are open to their fans pronouncing it however they like.

== History ==
=== 2015-2016: Creative beginnings and Nikak ===
In an interview, frontman Aleksey Avgustovsky said that he and lead guitarist Aleksandr Smirnov were living in tents in the south of Russia (near Anapa) when they decided to form a band in 2015. The other members, with the exception of Aleksandr, left the project after a year.

Uvula got their start playing in the St. Petersburg bar Ionoteka (Russian: Ионотека), known for its connection to the Russian underground music scene. The clubs states on its VK page that it is, "The same place where Buerak, Elektroforez, Ploho, RSAC, Ubiytsy, Kazuskoma, Sonic Death, Shortparis, Shchenki and other heroes of the domestic scene began."

The group released its first LP, Nikak (Russian: Никак, lit. 'No way'), on 4 April 2016. Released on the label Colanade Magic Bros, the record is notable for its shoegaze style.

In September 2016, Uvula performed at the Russian indie-music festival Homecultism alongside groups Padla Bear Outfit, Sonic Death, and others. During this performance, the band played songs from Nikak along with several early versions of songs that would end up on its second album Ya dumal u menya poluchit'sya (Russian: Я думал у меня получиться, lit. 'I thought I would succeed'). A compilation featuring the songs, “pulpy” and “natural behavior,” titled Homecultism Vol. 1 was released in 2016 by the label POW! POP KIDS. The songs “pulpy” and “natural behavior” would later be re-worked to become the songs “We” (Russian: Мы, romanized: My) and “Intro” respectively.

=== 2016-2019: Ya dumal u menya poluchit'sya and rising popularity ===
As the band gained a small following on the Russian social network VK, Avgustovsky became more serious about continuing the project. According to the group, following the release of Ya dumal u menya poluchit'sya in 2017 Uvula began to attract more fans and received various opportunities to play at larger venues. Though they began to make money through merch sales and concerts, the travel and housing costs affected the members. In 2019, Avgustovsky sold his car in order to produce more merch.

=== 2019-2020: Nam ostayotsya lish' zhdat', Nothing supernatural, and the COVID-19 pandemic ===
On April 1, 2019, Uvula released their third LP Nam ostayotsya lish' zhdat' (Russian: Нам остается лишь ждать, lit. 'We can only wait'). To present the album, the band held a concert in Moscow at the Aglomerat on April 30, 2019, supported by Avtosport (Russian: Автоспорт, lit. 'Autosport').

On 21 June 2019, Uvula played a concert at Nike Box in Gorky Park, Moscow. On 4 July 2019, they released the full recording of the concert on YouTube.

In 2020, Uvula joined Homework (Russian: Домашняя Работа, romanized: Domashnyaya Rabota), a label created by members of the group Pasosh: Kirill Gorodniy, Petar Martich and Grigoriy Drach.

On 5 March 2020, Uvula released their first EP, Nothing Supernatural (Russian: Ничего сверхъестественного, romanized: Nichevo sverkh"estestvennovo).

On 25 March 2020, the music festival Bol' (Russian: Боль, lit. 'Pain') held an online concert entitled "Karantin eto bol'" (Russian: Карантин – это боль, lit. 'Quarantine is pain') in which they collected funds for bands who had shows cancelled due to the COVID-19 pandemic. This included Uvula. Avgustovsky said in an interview with Sobaka that the band donated the money from this concert to the Sozidanie Foundation to help doctors in Russia.

Later, in March 2020, the group performed their song “Elektricheskiy Tok” (Russian: Электрический ток, lit. 'Electric current') on the Russian talk show Evening Urgant (Russian: Вечерний Ургант).

In April 2020, Uvula contributed a song titled Pobeg to the compilation album Ne vykhodya iz doma for the Institute of Music Initiatives (IMI). The album highlighted several local musicians who were affected by the pandemic, including Bicycles for Afghanistan, Intourist, and Soyuz among many others.

In April 2021, IMI hosted Aleksey Avgustovsky on a YouTube livestream entitled How to write good songs without in-depth songwriting knowledge (Russian: Как писать хорошие песни без углубленных знаний сонграйтинга). In the video, Avgustovsky shares tips from his experience with Uvula and songwriting in general.

=== 2021-2022: Severe Weather and disbandment ===
==== Leaving the label Homework ====
In 2021, the label Homework ceased operations after allegations of domestic violence were raised against Petar Martich, one of the founders of the group Pasosh. Aleksey Avgustovsky spoke out about these accusations and announced Uvula would be leaving the label. Avgustovsky stated on Uvula's telegram channel,

This morning, the band gathered to discuss everything preventing us from publishing the usual tour notes. Our band has decided to leave the label Homework, due to the accusations made against one of its founders. For us, a label is a community of people united by common ideas. We worked for creativity's sake, but unfortunately, now it has become something completely different, something not close to us.

We expected that the response would be dictated by the values that the label had previously promoted. We stood for honesty in our actions, equality, the LGBT+ community, for normal society and different Russia. We saw something else that annoyed us as musicians and people. Namely, backlash in the form of accusations. We support Anya Zosimova and worry about her.

==== Severe Weather ====
On 1 October 2021, the group released their most recent LP to date, Severe Weather (Russian: Устойчивая непогода, romanized: Ustoychivaya nepogoda, lit. 'Persistent bad weather'). Avgustovsky said in an interview that this was the first album the group had recorded on a tape recorder, with previous albums being mixed but not recorded in analog.

==== Leaving VK ====
In June 2022, the band released a statement on its group on Russian social network VK stating that they were no longer comfortable posting their music on the site. They also announced that they were removing their music from both VK Music and Yandex Music. The post made clear that the band did not want to use services from companies that “cooperate with the state,” and they also discouraged their followers from using services like VK.

On 30 November 2022, the group ceased operations after being placed on a list of “opinion leaders” by the Russian Federal communications, technology, and mass media agency Roskomnadzor. Following this, the group says, they were no longer able to perform at large venues within the Russian Federation.

On 15 December 2022, the group released a collection of Avgustovsky's demos to raise money for “humanitarian aid.”

=== Breakup ===
In 2023 every member of the group was placed on a list of “opinion leaders” in Russia by the state censorship agency Roskomnadzor following a crackdown on "foreign agents" in Russia which included many artists and opposition journalists. Aleksey has hinted numerous times at a blacklist which forced the group to stop performing at large concert venues. Aleksey and other members of the group fled to Yerevan, Armenia where they performed a concert and lived for some time.

=== 2023–present: Post-breakup ===
On 12 October 2023, the group released a set of merchandise ahead of their final EP.

On 1 January 2025, the group released the single "Tut i tam" (Russian: тут и там, romanized: Here and There) with the promise of new releases to come soon. Then, on 26 February 2025, the group released the single "Kafe" (Russian: Кафе, romanized: Cafe), telling fans on their Telegram channel that the "banquet" of new music would continue on 5 March. On that day, the group released the EP dancing with myself. Unlike previous releases, this EP was written and performed by Avgustovsky without the participation of the other band members.

On 8 October 2025 the group announced a China and Central Asia tour on their Instagram.

== Musical style and influences ==
Uvula's style is characterized by an indie rock sound that blends elements of jazz, synthwave, and post-punk. The art and culture website Colta.ru described the style as "atmospheric and romantic dream pop, immersed in a cozy '80s-style guitar twang..." One festival organizer described them as the “Russian version of The Smiths.” Uvula has often been described as a dreampop or surf rock band, sometimes even compared to Midwest emo, though the band itself rejects these comparisons. Furthermore, Avgustovsky stated in an interview that he thinks the band being termed post-punk is “rather rash.”

The band's earlier works (before 2020) have been described as "...extremely relaxed, as if melting in the pre-dawn mist..."

Commenting on Uvula's album Severe Weather, Avgustovsky noted:

We have become "heavier", it seems. The guitars have more pronounced tones, the bass is boosted in many places, and we may indeed have moved closer to alternative rock without intending to. This is hardly a bad thing, since, as a rule, our genre is defined for us, and the more assumptions there are, the more interesting the associations we evoke in the listener.

== Discography ==
=== LPs ===
Title	Year released	Notes
Nikak	2016	
Ya dumal u menya poluchitsya	2017	
Nam ostayotsya lish' zhdat'	2019	
Snova vozrashchayus' domoy	2020	Collaboration with the group Pasosh; Released on the label Homework
Severe Weather	2021	

=== EPs ===
Title	Year released	Notes
Nichego sverkh"estestvennogo	2020	
Dancing with myself	2025	

=== Singles ===
Title	Year released	Notes
Syorf	2017	
Den' 20!8	2017	
Without U (ft. SALUKI)	2017	
With U (ft. SALUKI)	2018	
Ty i tvoya ten'	2018	
Dom (ft. cherry candy)	2018	
Lyublyu (ft. 044 ROSE)	2018	
Novyy tvoy (ft. istochnik)	2019	
Ver' mne	2019	
Mnogo oshibok (ft. tima ishchet svet)	2019	
Dnyom s ognyom (ft. foresteppe)	2019	
Pobeg	2020	
Snova vozvrashchayus' domoy (ft. Pasosh)	2020	Released on the label Homework
Ne vidimsya	2020	Released on the label Homework
Syorf (live)	2020	
Fukc 2020	2020	Released on the label Homework
Uvidel drugoy	2021	
Wake me up when 2021 ends	2022	
Tut i tam (here and there)	2025	
Kafe (Cafe)	2025	

=== Demos ===
Title	Year released
Vneshnie vody	2016
Lek demos 16-22 pt.1	2022

=== Featuring Uvula ===
Title	Artist	Year released
No Way (ft. Uvula & Ars Was Taken)	Kindy King & SALUKI	2018
Molody Demo (ft. Uvula)	044 ROSE	2019
TRANSGRESSION (ft. Uvula)	Marble Bust	2019
Vnov' i vnov' (ft. Uvula)	BEJENEC	2021
V otele "Priboy" (ft. Uvula)	Trud	2021

== Band members ==
- Aleksey "Lek" Avgustovsky — guitar, lead vocals
- Aleksandr Smirnov — guitar
- Denis Shilovsky — drums
- Artemy Shilo — bass
  - Shilo frequently uses the Hohner B2A, a headless bass guitar introduced in the 1980s.
- Roma Kuzankin — keyboard

== Other projects ==
=== Circle K ===
Circle K (stylized: circle k) was a joint video production project between Aleksey Avgustovsky and Alyona Koleso. Together they recorded the music video for “ты и твоя тень.” That video now has more than one million views on YouTube (as of December 2023). They have also created music videos for musicians such as Sexhater and Tima ischet svet.

==== Releases ====
YouTube catalogue
Title	Artist	Type of work	Year
Kak ne boyat'cya	Sexhater	Music video	2020
Sobaka	Tima ischet svet	Music video (unofficial)	2020
fukc 2020	Uvula	Music video	2020

Other works
Title	Artist	Type of work	Year
Ty i tvoya ten'	Uvula	Music video	2018

=== Fleece Flower ===
Fleece Flower (stylized: fleece flower) is a project created by Aleksey Avgustovsky, producing EDM and Dance-inspired music with Avgustovsky's signature vocals. However, most of these songs have been removed from streaming services like Apple Music and Spotify. Recordings still exist on Bandcamp, YouTube, and SoundCloud.

==== Releases ====
LPs
Title	Year
Chto ty vidish'	2017
1999–2000	2019

Singles
Title	Year
Neznakomiy drug	2018
Izganannik	2019

=== Lek ===
Lek (stylized: lek) is a solo project created by Aleksey Avgustovsky. In 2022 he released his first LP entitled 1000 i 1 razbitoe serdtse.
