= Ash Code =

Italian dark wave band

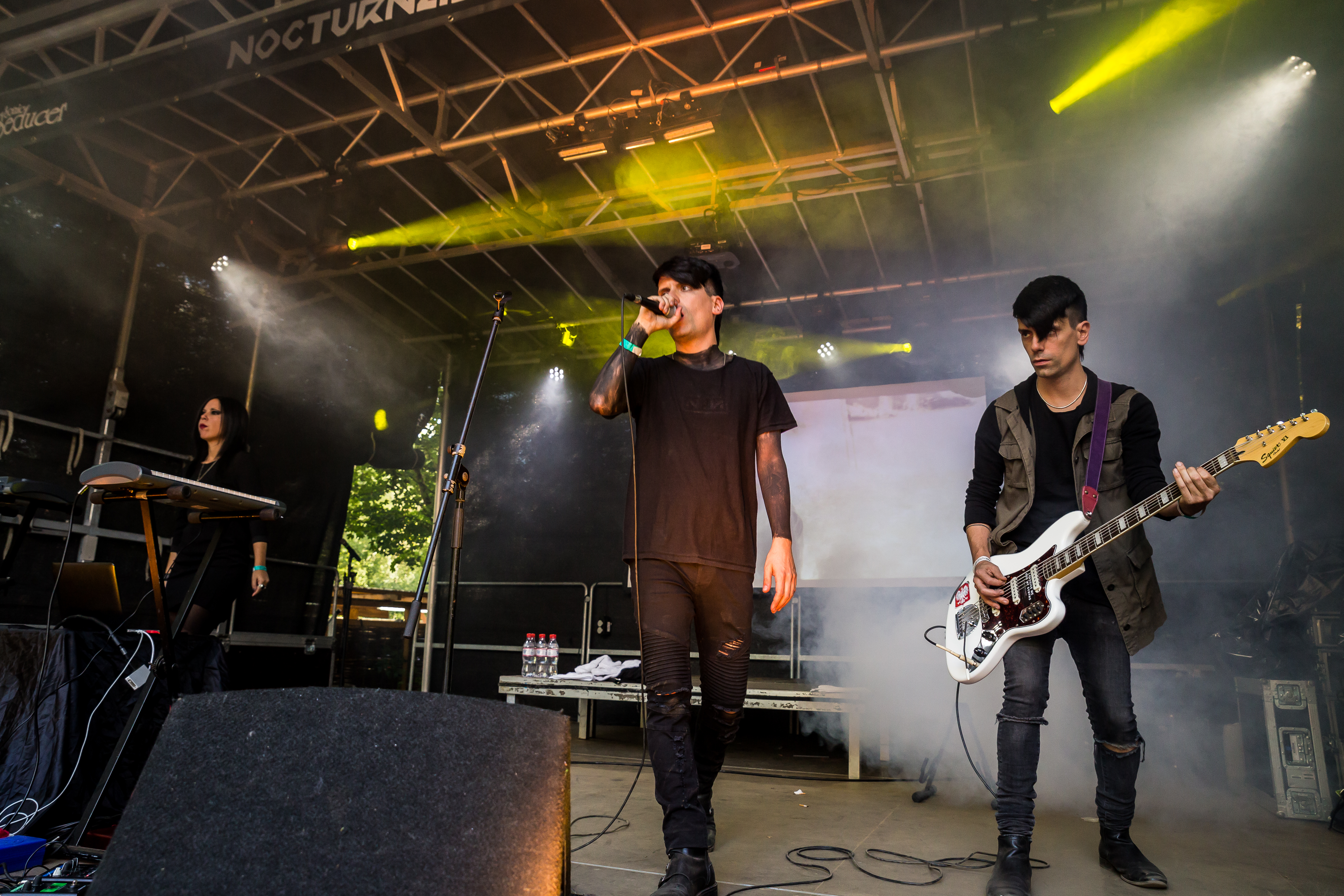
- Ash Code at Nocturnal Culture Night 2017

Background information
- Origin: Naples, Italy
- Genres: Dark wave
- Years active: 2014–present
- Labels: Metropolis Records; Swiss Dark Nights; Manic Depression Records; Icy Cold BPitch Control
- Spinoffs: Neila Invo
- Members: Alessandro Belluccio; Claudia Nottebella; Adriano Belluccio
- Website: ashcode.eu

Ash Code is an Italian dark wave band formed in 2014 in Naples by the singer Alessandro Belluccio, the keyboardist Claudia Nottebella and the bass player Adriano Belluccio. Ash Code's music encompasses a wide range of influences, including post-punk, synth-pop and EBM.

== History ==
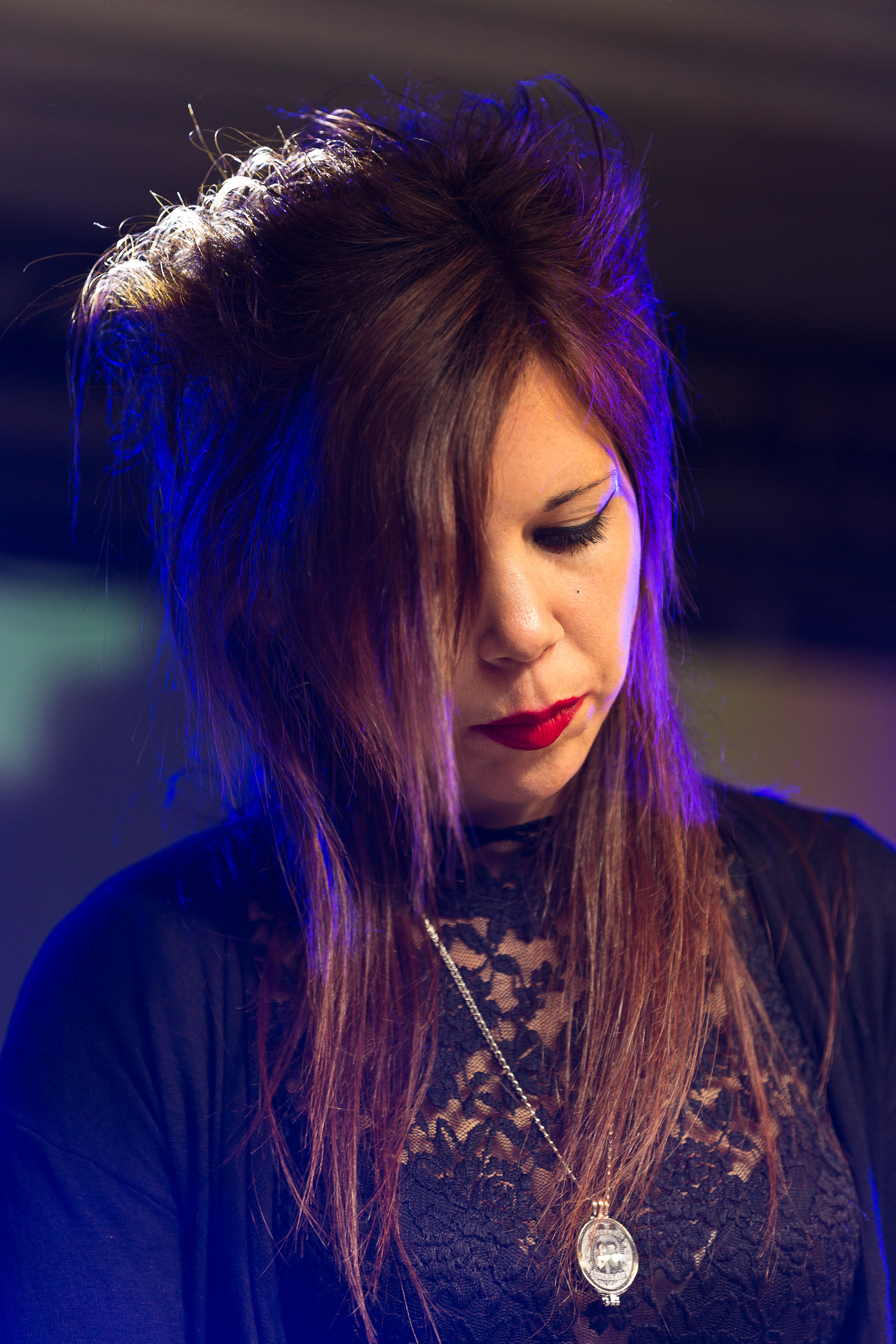
Claudia at NCN 2015

=== Early days ===
The band started informally when Alessandro began working with Claudia on two unfinished songs from his previous band. In January 2014, "Dry your Eyes" and "Unnecessary Songs" were released online. Positive feedback from the online releases prompted Alessandro and Claudia to begin more serious work as a band, bringing Alessandro's brother Adriano in to complete the trio. In a matter of weeks, they signed with the Greek label Gehemnis Records for releasing a 7" single (300 numbered copies in June 2014) and an extended mix of "Dry Your Eyes" was included in the third volume of "Pagan Love Songs" compilation (compiled by Ralf Thyssen and Thomas Thyssen) alongside other important bands like She Past Away, Linea Aspera, The Chameleons, Psyche, Ulterior, Miserylab.

A second digital single for the song "Empty Room" was released in June 2014 including the cover of "I can't escape myself" from The Sound as b-side.

=== 'Oblivion' LP (2014) ===
On October 15, 2014, Ash Code released their first full-length album, ‘Oblivion’ on CD under the Swiss Dark Nights label. The concept of oblivion described by the band is interpreted in accordance with Nietzschean philosophy, where forgetfulness was described as an active force to forget what one suffers and afflicts us without getting caught in a spiral of negative feelings and depression. It is one way to react positively to life, to avoid further pain and suffering. The work reached 2nd in the "Soundcheck" chart of Sonic Seducer and it was described as feverish and restless debut, capable of translating the Icy Expressionist theme pairing with the abrasive sweep of the neo industrial; essentially 10 tracks between Darkwave and black electro pop, succeeding at capturing the early days yet blending them into present time by means of modern Synthpop, catchy and tormented hints delivering one of the best Darkwave albums of 2014.

A second press of the CD was released in May 2015 with inverted colours for the cover, as well as a vinyl version under the label Manic Depression Records.

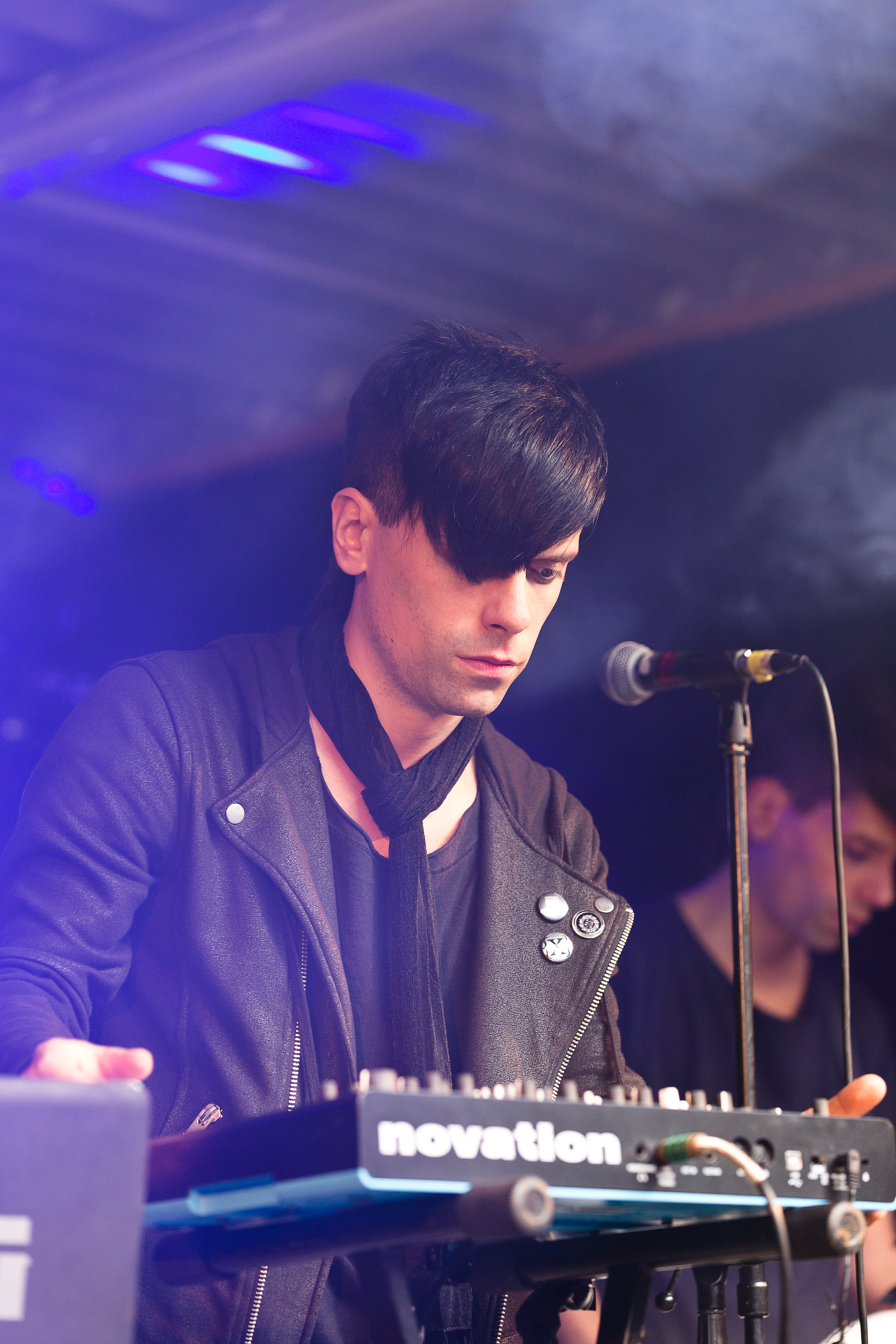
Alessandro at NCN 2015

=== 'Posthuman' LP (2016) ===
On 27 February 2016 their second LP "Posthuman" was released under the Swiss Dark Nights label. According to the band, we live in a posthuman era. It is an era of technology, of multiculturalism, of the transformation of every aspect of the world around us. In this radical change, the individual must relocate ethically, socially and politically while men must reformulate their values, with the understanding that they do not own the world but rather share it with other natural beings. The album reached the 2nd position in the "Soundcheck" chart of Sonic Seducer again and was described as a hectic work of obsessive rhythm and markedly post-punk.

The sepulchral vocals and dark catchiness of the supporting melodies, being constantly on the edge of a glacial minimalism made the album pretty much reverberating electrogoth similar to other seminal bands such as Clan Of Xymox, Depeche Mode, The Sisters of Mercy. The band used minimal wave structures ultimately intended for the dance floor and adhered to the dandy apocalyptic manifesto claiming Gary Numan, Soft Cell and Neon as inspirational fathers. Posthuman is also depicted as an album where the trio searches for new paths, personalizing the sound with noisy analog DIY synthesisers and instruments such as Mellotron and Theremin, being overall a more mature work and even more accessible than "Oblivion" .

In April 2016 a vinyl version with inverted colours for the cover was released under the label Manic Depression Records.

During the last months of 2016 they start to remix songs from their favourite bands like Moby, Hante, She Past Away and Massive Ego.

=== Perspektive LP (2018) and the first USA tour ===
A new single, "Icy Cold", was released on 9 June 2017 as a 7" single, as the first taste of the band's new direction. In the video the musicians can be seen playing inside the cold eyes of the protagonist.

On May 18, 2018, the band released the third album Perspektive on Swiss Dark Nights / Manic Depression Records. The LP reached the first position in the "Soundcheck" chart of Sonic Seducer and was selected as "Album of the month" too.

During September 2018 the band announced to have signed with Metropolis Records and every record is repressed on CD and vinyl in exclusive editions for North and South America during the autumn of 2018.

In the summer of 2019, the band toured the United States for the first time. After their final show in Los Angeles on September 9, they recorded a 'Part Time Punks' session at Comp NY Studio with Be Hussey, which was later released on CD including the bonus track "1981".

=== Coronavirus days + Fear EP (2020/2022) ===
On 14 February 2020, a remix of "She" from Clan of Xymox was released. The arrival of the Coronavirus spoiled all the band's plans, a LATAM tour in July 2020 was cancelled and a US tour scheduled for September 2020 too, but the band did not lose heart and was among the first ones to experiment a live streaming from home in March, raising funds for a local hospital.

Thanks to the success of the initiative, the band has been at the forefront working for the organization of the Gothicat Festivals, a series of charity online festivals made with contributions from the best bands of the darkwave/goth scene.

During the summer 2020 Claudia started the side project Neila Invo, a post-punk female trio.

On 19 March 2021 Fear EP was released, the work includes three brand new songs and remixes by Clan of Xymox, Molchat Doma and Forever Grey. The EP was presented during a live in streaming performance featuring Mike Dudley (The Sound), Eric 13 (Combichrist) and Jon Siren (Iamx, Front Line Assembly, Psyclon Nine, Dismantled).

In December 2021 the band released a cover of the famous Bauhaus's song "All We Ever Wanted Was Everything" as a tribute to the English band.

In July 2022 Kill Shelter released "Feed the Fire" featuring Ash Code on vocals and synths, the song is included in the Asylum LP.

On 28 October 2022 the American skateboarding lifestyle brand Supreme used "Sand" song for a promotional video on their social media.

=== Dance and Kill (2023) ===
The year 2023 opens with a new course for the band: at the beginning of April the imminent publication of Dance and Kill is announced, an EP on vinyl containing 3 unreleased tracks composed in collaboration with the famous techno legend Ellen Allien. The collaboration was born by chance online and developed several times throughout 2022.

The second single "Everything collapses" was premiered on 16 May 2023 on BBC Radio 6 Music by Mary Anne Hobbs and on Billboard Italia.

Lol Tolhurst (co-founder The Cure) references the band in his book Goth: A History, specifically in the section dedicated to contemporary musical acts that delve into the realm of dark and moody soundscapes.

In January 2024, the photographer Michel Haddi (famous for his shots of Tupac, David Bowie, Kate Moss and many others) decides to use the music of Ash Code for "Caserta Royal", a short film dedicated to the fashion brand Sapio.

=== Synthome (2024 – Present) ===
On 5th September 2025 Ash Code released their fourth studio album 'Synthome'. The work, inspired by the Lacanian concept of the “sinthome”, was developed after a period of personal and artistic crisis and explores themes of grief, resilience and rebirth. Mainly mixed and mastered by Doruk Öztürkcan of She Past Away, the album was anticipated by many singles, in particular 'Ángel Oscuro', whose video features lyrics partly in Spanish. Synthome was issued on CD, cassette and several vinyl editions, and was described by the press as a darker and more mature chapter in the band’s career, blending Darkwave, EBM and synth-pop with a more cinematic approach.

== Live performances ==
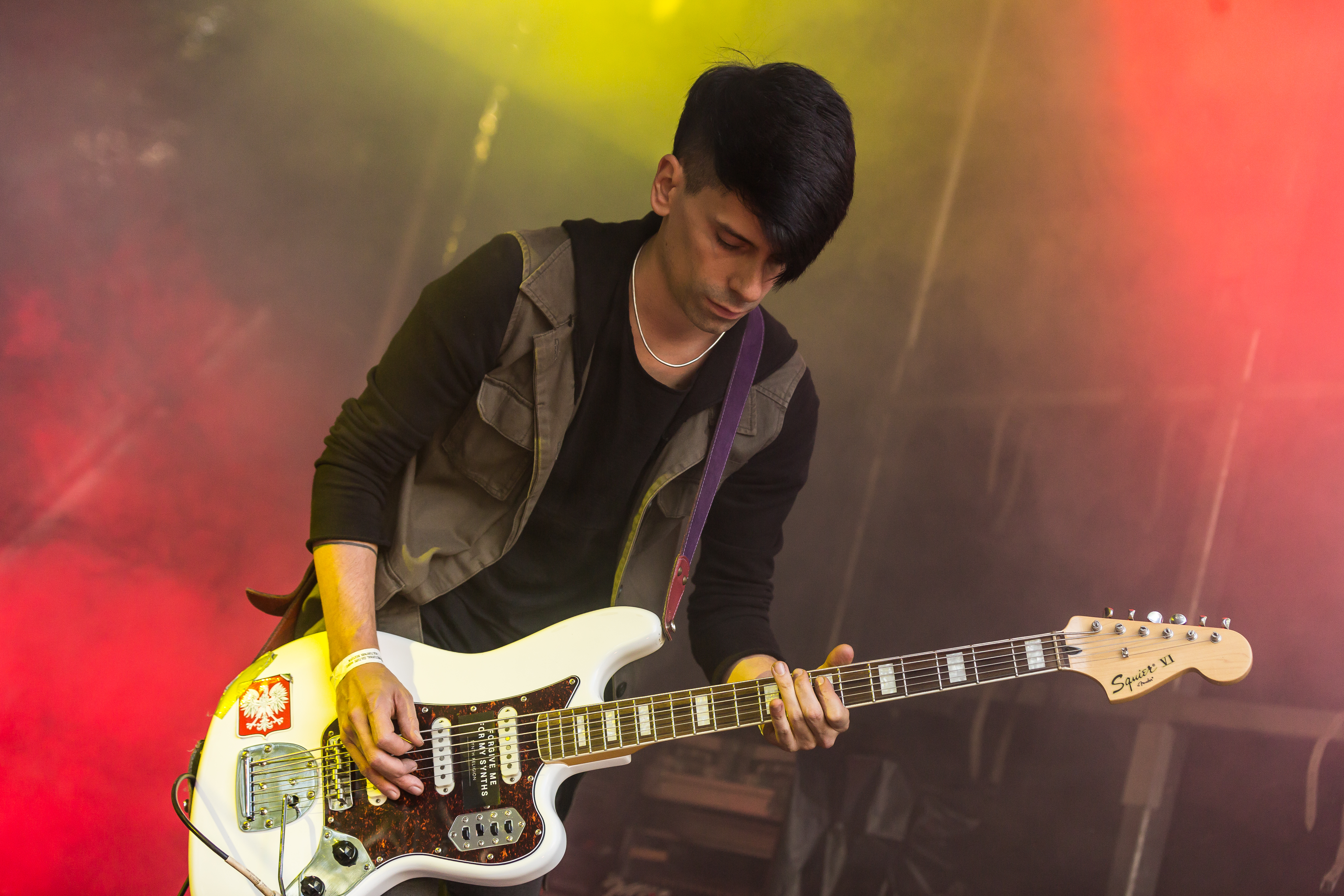
Adriano at NCN 2017

The band toured Europe, US, Latin America, Russia, visiting 27 different countries and sharing the stage with important bands of the scene such as Gang of Four, Mr.Kitty, IAMX, Lebanon Hanover, Clan of Xymox, She Past Away, Cold Cave, Boy Harsher, Drab Majesty, The Soft Moon, Twin Tribes, Traitrs, ULTRA SUNN, Actors, Kælan Mikla, Selofan, Front Line Assembly, Hante, Covenant, Minuit Machine, Agent Side Grinder, Trisomie 21, The Frozen Autumn, Skeletal Family, Pink Turns Blue, Sigue Sigue Sputnik, Lord of the Lost, UK Decay, Balaam and the Angel, New Model Army, Kirlian Camera, The Invincible Spirit, Sixth June, Veil of Light, Creux Lies and Wingtips.

They have also performed at festivals such as Wave-Gotik-Treffen (2015, 2018, 2023, 2026), Grauzone (2023), Amphi Festival (2019,2022), Entremuralhas (2015), Castle Party (2019, 2026), Cold Waves Festival (2023), Nocturnal Culture Night (2015,2017,2025), W-Festival (2018), Dark Storm Festival (2018), Cold Hearted Festival (2022), Prague Gothic Treffen XIII (2018), E-Only (2020), Tomorrow's Ghosts Festival(2025), Fekete Zaj Fesztivál (2019) and A Murder of Crows Festival (2019)

== Name, sound and influences ==
The two words of the band's moniker have the initials A and C corresponding to those of the band members. They chose "Ash" in homage to the Vesuvius, the active volcano near Naples and to Daniel Ash. "Code" was added to evoke something indefinite yet existentialist. Their music is deeply influenced by early 80's tunes from bands like Depeche Mode and The Sisters of Mercy, a sound devoted to the drum machine, powerful synthesisers and benefitting from the versatility of a Fender VI bass, a formula previously used by New Order and The Cure.

== Band members ==
Current members

- Alessandro Belluccio – lead vocals, programming
- Claudia Nottebella – keyboards, backing vocals
- Adriano Belluccio – bass

== Discography ==
=== LP ===
- Oblivion (2014) Swiss Dark Nights / Metropolis Records / Manic Depression Records / Icy Cold
- Posthuman (2016) Swiss Dark Nights / Metropolis Records / Manic Depression Records
- Perspektive (2018) Swiss Dark Nights / Metropolis Records / Manic Depression Records
- Synthome (2025) Swiss Dark Nights

=== EP ===
- Fear (2021) Swiss Dark Nights
- Dance And Kill (2023) BPitch Control

=== Singles 7" ===
- Dry Your Eyes (2014) Gehemnis Records
- Icy Cold (2017) Synth Religion

=== Live ===
- Live Dark Entries (2016) Swiss Dark Nights
- Live in Freiburg (with Hapax & Geometric Vision)(2017) Swiss Dark Nights
- Part Time Punks Session(Live in Los Angeles)(2020) Swiss Dark Nights

=== Remixes made by Ash Code ===
- She Past Away – Katarsis(Ash Code REMIX) (2016)
- Hante – Living In A French Movie(Ash Code REMIX) (2016)
- Moby – Are You Lost In The World Like Me?(Ash Code Remix) (2017)
- Massive Ego – For The Blood In Your Veins (Ash Code Remix) (2017)
- Antipole – Closer(Ash Code Remix) (2018)
- Holygram – Daria(Ash Code Remix) (2018)
- Euringer(Jimmy Urine/Mindless Self Indulgence side project) – Problematic(Ash Code Remix) (2019)
- SJÖBLOM – The Last Call(Ash Code Remix) (2019)
- RED INDUSTRIE – Körper Reich (Ash Code Remix) (2019)
- JE T'AIME – Dance (Ash Code Remix) (2020)
- Clan of Xymox – She (Ash Code Remix) (2020)
- Porn (fr) – Low Winter Hope (Ash Code Remix) (2020)
- Chelsea Wolfe – Erde (Ash Code Remix) (2020)
- ELZ AND THE CULT – ULTRAVIOLENCE (Ash Code Remix) (2020)
- Clan of Xymox – All I ever know (Ash Code Remix) (2020)
- Geometric Vision – Slowemotion (Ash Code Remix) (2020)
- undertheskin – End This Summer (Ash Code Remix) (2020)
- Agent Side Grinder – Inner Noises (Ash Code Remix) (2020)
- Twin Tribes – Fantasmas (Ash Code Remix) (2021)
- Whispers in the shadow – Passion Project (Ash Code Remix ) (2021)
- Bestial Mouths – The Bleed (Ash Code Remix ) (2021)
- Elektroforez – Зло (Ash Code Remix) (2021)
- This Eternal Decay – (Ash Code Remix) (2021)
- Nürnberg – Abdymi (Ash Code Remix) (2021)
- Neila Invo – Murder's Prayer (Ash Code Remix) (2021)
- Wires And Lights – Drive (Ash Code Remix) (2021)
- Creux Lies - Misunderstanding (2023)
- Caron Dimonio - Grey (2026)
- Modele - Pleasure For the Holy (2026)
- The Spoiled - Hole In A Chest (2026)

=== Remixes of Ash Code's songs ===
- Oblivion – Minuit Machine Remix (2014)
- Dry your eyes – Ken Utterson Remix (2014)
- Unnecessary Songs – Tr80R remix (2014)
- Nite Rite – Delphine Coma Remix (2016)
- Tide – Orax Remix (2016)
- Posthuman – Electrogenic Remix (2016)
- Alone in Your Dance – Emerson Dracon Remix (2016)
- Disease – Hante Remix (2018)
- Perspektive – We Are Temporary Remix (2018)
- If You Were Here – She Pleasures Herself Remix (2018)
- Glow – Agent Side Grinder Remix (2018)
- Perspektive – The Ne-21 Remix (2018)
- Icy Cold – Selfishadows Remix (2018)
- Fear – Clan Of Xymox Remix (2021)
- Fear – Molchat Doma Remix (2021)
- Fear – Forever Grey Remix (2021)
- Nostalgia – The Spoiled Remix (2024)
- Living For The Sound – Nürnberg Remix (2025)
- Scar - Antipole (2025)
- Àngel Oscuro - Dave Clarke (2026)
- Dancing To The Noise Tobias Bernstrup (2026)

== Videography ==
- Dry Your Eyes (2014)
- Empty Room (2014)
- Oblivion (2014)
- Crucified (2015)
- Nite Rite (2015)
- Tide (2016)
- Posthuman (2016)
- Icy Cold (2017)
- Perspektive (2018)
- Black Gloves (2018)
- Disease (2019)
- 1981 (2020)
- Fear (2021)
- Fear – Clan Of Xymox Remix (2021)
- Fear – Molchat Doma Remix (2021)
- All We Ever Wanted Was Everything (2021)
- Dance And Kill feat. Ellen Allien (2023)
- Everything Collapses feat. Ellen Allien (2023)
- Shining On You feat. Ellen Allien (2023)
- Tear You Down (2023)
- Nostalgia (2024)
- Living For The Sound (2025)
- Scar (2025)
- Ángel Oscuro (2025)
- Dancing To The Noise (2025)
- Run In The Dark (2025)
