= Stereopolina =

Russian singer-songwriter (born 1995)

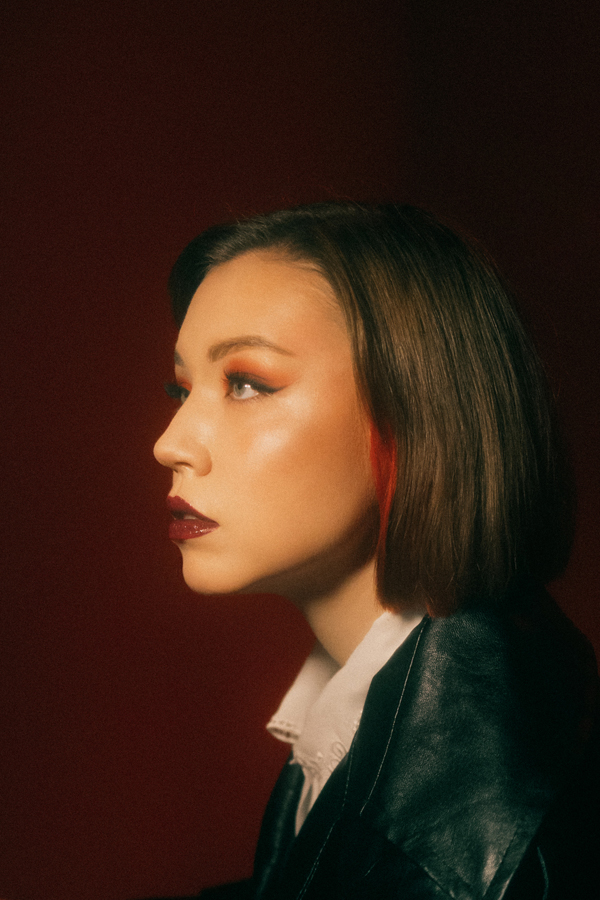
Stereopolina in 2023

Stereopolina (Russian: Стереополина, real name - Karina Nailevna Morgunova, May 5, 1995, Kazan) is a Russian synthpop, synthwave, postpunk and electroclash singer and songwriter. She has participated in multiple music festivals (VK fest, Stereoleto, Motherland, Moscow Music Week, XX Moscow Synthetic Snow Festival).

== Early life ==
Morgunova was born on May 5, 1995, in Kazan. In 2001, at the age of six, she entered 28 school of music in Kazan in the class of piano. She doesn't have a family with a history in the arts. As a teenager she became a member of a folk-metal band, in which she played bass guitar.

After graduating from high school she entered the Kazan State Institute of Culture and Arts in the Department of Film and TV.

== Career ==
While studying at the institute, she began to work as chief audioengineer at the Na Bulake Youth Theatre in Kazan. She worked there until she moved to St. Petersburg, when she was a fifth-year student.

In August 2018, her debut album "Twilight Zone" (Russian: «Сумеречная зона») was released. In October 2018, she performed as a warm-up act for Molchat Doma in St. Petersburg, at the presentation of their album, Etazhi.

In January 2020, she released her second album, "Institute of Culture and Recreation" (Russian: «Институт культуры и отдыха»), which proved to be a landmark album for her career. After releasing the album, Morgunova started doing work in the genres of synthpop and retrowave.

In 2021, the music video for the song "Last Date" was released and made it to MTV's "12 Angry Viewers" (Russian: «12 злобных зрителей») show and the Silver Screening selection at the Berlin Music Video Awards. Later that same year, she released the album "Institute of Culture and Recreation" (record edition by Maschina Records; CD and CD-cassette edition by Siepien Records). In October 2021 she released her third album, "Superluniye" (Russian: «Суперлуние»).

In February 2022, the music video for the song "Sunny Boy" (Russian: «Солнечный мальчик») was released. In the fall, she released the third mini album "Guests With No Future" (Russian: «Гости без будущего»). Among the recorded songs is a joint song with Lyokha Nikonov and a cover of the song "Love is power" (Russian: «Любовь — это власть») by the band Banda Chetyryokh (Russian: «Банда четырёх»).

== Reception ==
"Institute of Culture and Recreation", Stereopolina's was included in several year-end tops, namely "Nozh" magazine and National Public Radio. The song "Last date" (Russian: «Последнее свидание») made it to the year-end tops of Post-Punk.com and "100 Best Songs" by Afisha Daily.

Her 2021 album "Superluniye" was among the top 50 best albums of 2021 according to The Flow and among the best pop albums according to Afisha Daily.

The music video for the song "Sunny Boy" which was nominated for Best Narrative at the Berlin Music Video Awards as part of their 2022 nominees. Stereopolina's mini album "Guests With No Future" was included in the top 100 best albums of the year by "Pravila Zhizni" magazine. It was included in the personal top 10 best albums of the year 2022 by music critic Andrei Bukharin.

== Discography ==
=== Studio albums ===
- "Twilight Zone" «Сумеречная зона» (2018)
- "Institute of Culture and Recreation" «Институт культуры и отдыха» (2020)
- "Instrumental" (2020)
- "Superluniye" «Суперлуние» (2021)

=== EPs ===
- EP "Yad" «Яд» (2018)
- EP "August" «Август» (2019)
- EP "Gosti bez budushchevo" «Гости без будущего» (2022)

=== Singles ===
- «Je suis riche» feat. Nikita Sokolov (2018)
- "Silent cinema" «Немое кино» (2019)
- "Sunny boy" «Солнечный мальчик» (2020)

=== Tributes ===
- "Louder!" «Еще громче!» (tribute to Tarakany) (2021)
- «Мы вышли из Кино 2» (tribute to Kino) (2022)
- "Colibri" «Колибри», tribute (2023)
- "Ricochet" Рикошет, tribute (soon) (2023)

=== Featured ===
- "In years" «Через года» - Фирма-Однодневка feat. Stereopolina (2019)
- "Bezhat' proch'" «Бежать прочь» - Аудиопреступление feat. Stereopolina (2020)
- "Poydu gulyat'" «Пойду гулять» - Нюдовый Чес feat. Stereopolina (2020)
- «НВГДН» - Валентин Дядька feat. Stereopolina (2020)
- "Nye vremya dlya sna" «Не время для сна» - Кирилл Коперник, Paella, Stereopolina (2021)
- «Я.Х.Б.С.Т.» MIMIKO feat. Стереополина (2021)
- "Vlyubilas' nechayanno" «Влюбилась нечаянно» - розовый рап feat. Stereopolina (2021)
- «Б=Л» - MIMIKO feat. Stereopolina (2022)
- "Secret" «Секрет» - Культурное Наследие feat. Stereopolina (2021)
- "V zimnem parke" «В зимнем парке» - Гипнобаза feat. Stereopolina (2021)
- "Krovavaya luna" «Кровавая луна» - Rigos feat. Stereopolina (2021)
- "Lepestok" «Лепесток» - Парнишка feat. Stereopolina (2022)
- "Pora tantsevat'" «Пора танцевать» - Кирилл Коперник feat. Stereopolina (2022)
- "Bad trip" «Бэдтрип» - MIMIKO, Stereopolina feat. слеза (2022)
- "Plany" «Планы» - Серцелев, Stereopolina (2022)
- "Nye smeshno" «Не смешно» - Влажность, Stereopolina (2023)
- "Nye geroy" «Не герой» Колибри трибьют - Komplimenter, Stereopolina (2023)
- «Bladerunner» - grust200, Stereopolina (2023)
- "Proshchay mir" «Прощай, мир!» - ГАФТ, Stereopolina (2023)

== Videography ==
- Последнее свидание on YouTube director: Arseniy Kuznetsov (2020)
- Полтинник on YouTube, director: Kseniya Morochkovskaya (2021)
- Солнечный мальчик on YouTube, director: Arseniy Kuznetsov (2022)
- Лепесток on YouTube, director: Evgeniy Klimov (2022)

== Interviews ==
- KUDAGO, Казань глазами Стереополины
- Большой Город, Как создавался мини-альбом “Гости без будущего”
- TimeOut, Стереополина, певица и саундпродюсер: «Я музыкальный фанатик с малых лет»
- Правила Жизни, Стереополина: в современной мейнстриме не хватает искренности
