= Etazhi =

Etazhi Этажи

Studio album by Molchat Doma
- Released: 7 September 2018
- Recorded: 2017–2018 in Minsk
- Genres: Post-punk; cold wave; new wave; synth-pop
- Length: 33:13
- Language: Russian
- Labels: Detriti, Sacred Bones
- Producer: Roman Komogortsev (Note: Credited for recording and mixing.)

Molchat Doma chronology
S krysh nashikh domov (2017)	Etazhi; Этажи (2018)	Monument (2020)

Singles from Etazhi
- 1. "Коммерсанты" Released: 24 July 2017

Etazhi (Russian: Этажи, IPA: [ɪtɐˈʐɨ], "Floors") is the second studio album by Belarusian post-punk band Molchat Doma, first released on 7 September 2018 through Detriti Records. Following the band's signing with Sacred Bones Records in January 2020, the album was released in North America for the first time on 27 March 2020.

== Composition ==
The production of Etazhi has been described as lo-fi but slightly more clean and reminiscent of '80s music than the band's 2017 debut album, С крыш наших домов (From Our Houses' Rooftops). A drum machine, programmed by the band's guitarist and sound engineer Roman Komogortsev, is used throughout in place of a standard acoustic drummer. Maximilian Turp-Balazs of Emerging Europe drew comparisons to New Order's 1983 album Power, Corruption & Lies, especially for the album's opening track, "На дне" ("At the Bottom"). "Судно (Борис Рыжий)" is the musicalized version of the poem "Эмалированное судно" ("Enamelled Bedpan") by the late poet and writer Boris Ryzhy.

== Release ==
Over a year prior to the release of the album, the eighth track, "Коммерсанты" ("Businessmen"), was self-released as a digital single through Bandcamp on 24 July 2017. Etazhi was first released on 7 September 2018 through German independent label Detriti Records as a download and 12-inch vinyl. The album was also unofficially uploaded in full to YouTube by a user named "Harakiri Diat", who had also uploaded full albums by other post-punk and synthwave bands. That upload of Etazhi garnered two million listens before eventually being taken down due to a copyright notice in 2020.

In January 2020, Molchat Doma signed with American independent label Sacred Bones Records, who later reissued Etazhi on 27 March 2020. The reissue was also the first North American pressing of the album. Throughout the first half of 2020, the album's seventh track, "Судно (Борис Рыжий)" ("Bedpan (Boris Ryzhy)"), gained viral popularity as a result of the song being used often as background music on TikTok; the song has appeared in around 225,000 videos on the platform. The song peaked at number two on the Spotify Global Viral 50 chart and number one on the United States Viral 50 chart in early May.

== Album cover ==
The building on the cover of the album is Hotel Panorama, a work of Soviet modernist architecture which is located in Štrbské Pleso, Slovakia. The design of the building was made by Czech architect Zdeněk Řihák.

== Track listing ==
All lyrics are written by Egor Shkutko, except "Sudno" by Boris Ryzhy; all music is composed by Roman Komogortsev.

Этажи (Etazhi) track listing
No.	Title	Length
1.	"На дне" (Na dne, "At the Bottom")	4:07
2.	"Танцевать" (Tantsevat' (officially romanized as Tancevat), "Dance")	3:22
3.	"Фильмы" (Fil'my, "Films")	4:17
4.	"Волны" (Volny, "Waves")	4:21
5.	"Тоска" (Toska, "Yearning")	3:09
6.	"Прогноз" (Prognoz, "Forecast")	3:04
7.	"Судно (Борис Рижий)" (Sudno (Boris Ryzhy), "Bedpan (Boris Ryzhy)")	2:21
8.	"Коммерсанты" (Kommersanty, "Businessmen")	3:49
9.	"Клетка" (Kletka, "Stairwell")	4:43
Total length:		33:13

== Personnel ==
Molchat Doma

- Egor Shkutko – vocals
- Roman Komogortsev – guitar, synthesizers, drum machine, mixing, recording, mastering
- Pavel Kozlov – bass guitar, synthesizers

== Release history ==
Region	Date	Format	Label	Catalog no.	Ref.
Various	7 September 2018	Download, streaming	Detriti	—N/a	
Europe	7 September 2018	12-inch vinyl	Detriti	DR-004	
North America	27 March 2020	12-inch vinyl	Sacred Bones	SBRLP3037	
North America	27 March 2020	CD	Sacred Bones	SBRCD3037	
