= Monument (Molchat Doma album) =

Monument Монумент

Studio album by Molchat Doma
- Released: 13 November 2020
- Recorded: 2020 in Minsk
- Genres: Post-punk; cold wave; new wave; synth-pop
- Length: 40:11
- Language: Russian
- Label: Sacred Bones
- Producer: Roman Komogortsev (Note: Credited for recording and mixing.)

Molchat Doma chronology
Etazhi (2018)	Monument; Монумент (2020)	Belaya Polosa (2024)

Singles from Monument
- 1. "Не смешно" Released: 15 September 2020; 2. "Дискотека" Released: 14 October 2020; 3. "Ответа нет" Released: 29 October 2020

Monument (Russian: Монумент) is the third studio album by Belarusian post-punk band Molchat Doma. It was released on 13 November 2020 through Sacred Bones Records, their first release with the label after signing with them in January 2020. It was recorded in their home town of Minsk in the midst of the COVID-19 pandemic, which caused the cancelation of their previously planned 2020 tour. The singles "Не смешно" (Not Funny), "Дискотека" (Discotheque), and "Ответа нет" (No Answer) were released in promotion of the album. Monument received positive reviews from critics and entered some US Billboard charts, including Top Album Sales at number 97 and World Albums at number 12.

== Background ==
Molchat Doma's second studio album, Etazhi (Floors), was released in September 2018. Throughout the next year, the album slowly gained popularity on YouTube through an unofficially uploaded stream of the album, which gained roughly two million listens before being taken down due to a copyright notice, as well as recommendations and playlists on the platform. While touring in 2019, the band performed the then-unrecorded songs "Не смешно" (Not Funny) and "Ответа нет" (No Answer), both of which would later appear on Monument.

The band later signed with American independent record label Sacred Bones Records in January 2020. Around the same time, one of the songs from Etazhi, "Судно (Борис Рыжий)" (Vessel (Boris Ryzhy)), began gaining popularity on the video sharing platform TikTok as a result of it being used frequently as background music in videos on the platform; this would cause the song to eventually reach No. 2 on the Spotify worldwide Viral 50 chart and No. 1 on the United States Viral 50 chart. Molchat Doma were set to tour North America, alongside American singer-songwriter Chrysta Bell, in 2020, but were forced to postpone their tour dates when the COVID-19 pandemic had severely impacted the continent. While isolating in their home town of Minsk due to the severity of the pandemic, they began recording a new album.

== Promotion and release ==
Monument was officially announced as Molchat Doma's third studio album on 15 September 2020. On the same day, they released the lead single from the album, "Не смешно". A music video for the song was released on 29 September. A second single from the album, "Дискотека" (Discotheque), was released on 14 October, with a music video also being released on the same day. The third and final pre-release single for the album, "Ответа нет" was released on 29 October, with an accompanying lyric video also being released for it. The band also performed the song live on the Russian late night talk show Evening Urgant.

Monument was released on 13 November 2020 through Sacred Bones Records, the band's first release through the label. It received releases on digital platforms for download and streaming as well as physical releases. It received standard releases as a CD, cassette, and black 12-inch vinyl. The album also received multiple exclusive vinyl releases. Through Sacred Bones' website, a blue vinyl limited to 2,000 copies, "blue ice" vinyl limited to 1,000 copies, and blue vinyl with deluxe packaging limited to 400 copies were made available. Members of Sacred Bones' Record Society club were also able to exclusively order a "purple stardust" vinyl through the website. Exclusive versions were also sold by Rough Trade in the United Kingdom as a "black and clear splatter" vinyl, Newbury Comics in the United States as a silver vinyl, and Seasick Records in the United States as a "blue stardust" vinyl.

== Critical reception ==
Professional ratings
Aggregate scores
Source	Rating
Metacritic	80/100
Review scores
Source	Rating
AllMusic	4/5 stars
Loud and Quiet	8/10
MusicOMH	4/5 stars
Pitchfork	7.0/10
PopMatters	8/10 stars
Spectrum Culture	80%

Monument received positive reviews from music critics. At Metacritic, which assigns a normalised rating out of 100 to reviews from professional publications, the album received an average score of 80, based on 5 reviews, indicating "generally favorable reviews". AllMusic's Paul Simpson felt that Monument sounded "brighter and more polished" than Etazhi as well as "more overtly danceable than their earlier records". Simpson further stated that the album contained "some of their most hook-filled songs to date". Nick Soulsby of PopMatters wrote that "the album's clearest virtue is its precision: nine songs, no filler, no visible weaknesses — Monument is as solid as the monoliths to which it harkens".

Matt Cotsell of musicOMH complimented the album's title and overall imagery, adding that "Molchat Doma are having a blast reclaiming their heritage and proving themselves to be a more than an entertaining chip off the old Bloc". Writing for The Quietus, Laviea Thomas wrote that "in so many ways, Monument encapsulates everything Molchat Doma has to offer", feeling that it was a proper finish to a successful year for the band that included a signing to Sacred Bones Records and an uptick in streams. Pitchfork's Ashley Bardhan felt the album's performances sounded "more confident" with the music sounding "less muddy", also complimenting the band's decision not to "[pander] to the audience attracted by their improbable TikTok breakthrough".

== Commercial performance ==
In the United States, Monument failed to enter the Billboard 200, the primary album chart for the country, although it entered other Billboard charts. On the Top Album Sales chart, which counts only pure album sales, the album entered at No. 97. On the World Albums chart, which ranks the best-selling world music albums, the album entered at No. 12. Additionally, it peaked at No. 14 on the Top Tastemaker Albums chart and number 21 on the Heatseekers Albums chart.

== Album cover ==
The monument depicted on the cover of the album is the Monument to Party Founding in Pyongyang, the capital of North Korea. This aligns with Molchat Doma's tendency to portray Soviet-style architecture and aesthetics, as they had with earlier album Etazhi.

== Track listing ==
All lyrics are written by Egor Shkutko; all music is composed by Roman Komogortsev.

Monument track listing
No.	Title	Length
1.	"Утонуть" (Utonut', "Drown")	5:44
2.	"Обречен" (Obrechen, "Doomed")	4:08
3.	"Дискотека" (Diskoteka, "Discotheque" (officially translated as "Discoteque" [sic]))	4:04
4.	"Не смешно" (Ne smeshno, "Not Funny")	3:52
5.	"Ответа нет" (Otveta net, "No Answer")	4:02
6.	"Звезды" (Zvezdy, "Stars")	3:46
7.	"Удалил твой номер" (Udalil tvoy nomer, "Deleted Your Number")	5:10
8.	"Ленинградский блюз" (Leningradskiy blyuz, "Leningrad Blues")	4:00
9.	"Любить и выполнять" (Lyubit' i vypolnyat', "To Love and Fulfill")	5:26
Total length:		40:12

== Personnel ==
Personnel adapted from album liner notes.

Molchat Doma

- Egor Shkutko – vocals
- Roman Komogortsev – guitar, lead synthesizer, drum machine programming, mixing, recording engineer, mastering, arrangements
- Pavel Kozlov – bass guitar, synthesizer

Other personnel

- Kanaplev-Leydik – photography
- Molchat Doma – cover art concept
- Andrey Yakovlev – cover art design

Equipment

- Korg Mono/Poly
- Korg Polysix
- LEL-0041
- Linn LM-1 (samples only)
- Minimoog Model D
- Roland Alpha Juno-2
- Roland Juno-106
- Roland JX-3P
- Yamaha DX7

== Charts ==
Chart performance for Monument
Chart (2020)	Peak position
US Heatseekers Albums (Billboard)	21
US Top Album Sales (Billboard)	97
US Indie Store Album Sales (Billboard)	14
US World Albums (Billboard)	12
