= Buerak =

Russian rock band

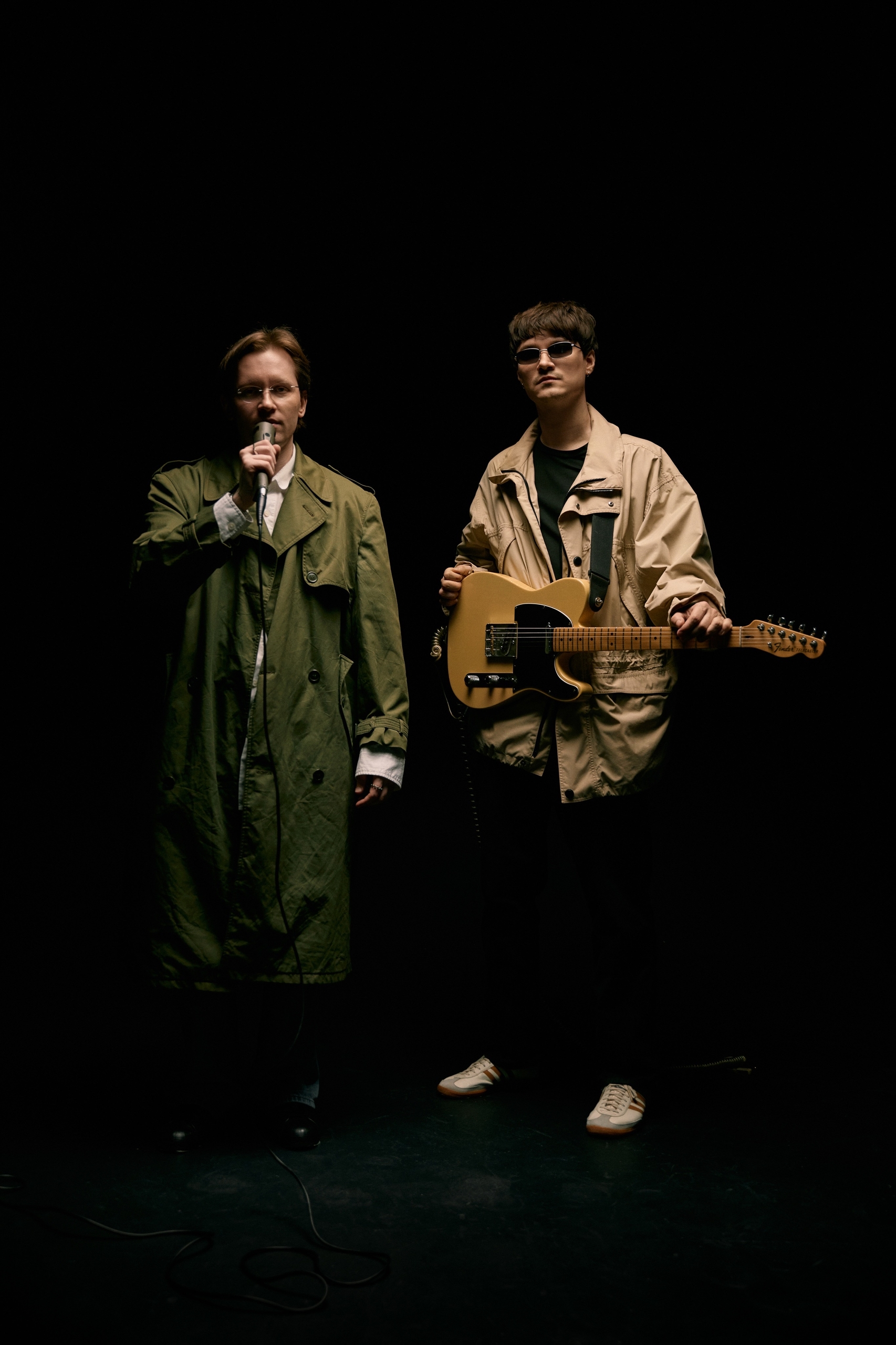
- A photo of Buerak from their VK page

Background information
- Origin: Novosibirsk, Russia
- Genres: Post-punk
- Years active: 2014–present
- Label: Свет и Тени
- Members: Artyom Cherepanov Alexandr Makeyev

Buerak (Russian: Буерак, "Gully") is a post-punk band from Novosibirsk, Russia. It was founded in 2014 by Artyom Cherepanov and Alexandr Makeyev. According to Afisha magazine, Buerak is one of the main groups of the "new Russian wave". In 2017, the musicians of the band accused their former tour manager Stepan Kazaryan of fraud.

== Discography ==
=== Studio albums ===
- 2016 – Танцы По Расчёту
- 2017 – Скромные Апартаменты
- 2018 – Репост Модерн
- 2019 – Шоу-бизнес
- 2020 - Компактные откровения
- 2021 - Танцы По Расчёту 2
- 2022 - Музей устаревшего искусства
- 2023 - Ожидание/Реальность
- 2025 - Ткстуры

=== Extended plays ===
- 2014 – Преступность / Крестьянство
- 2015 – Пролетариат
- 2016 – Корни
- 2019 – Готика
- 2019 – Китайский Квартал
- 2019 - SEND NUDES
- 2020 – Среди них ты
- 2022 - Акустика
- 2023 - Некролог
- 2024 - Провинциальный Неформал
- 2024 - Отпуск Без Конца

=== Singles ===
Title	Year	Peak chart positions	Album
Title	Year	RUS	Album
"Портреты"	2014	—	Non-album single
"Спортивные Очки"	2014	—	Пролетариат
"Полны любви"	2014	—	Non-album single
"Двойник"	2015	—	Non-album single
"Формы"	2015	—	Non-album single
"Зимние песни"	2015	—	Non-album single
"Страсть к курению"	2016	—	Танцы По Расчёту
"Влюбленный Альфонс"	2016	—	Non-album single
"Усталость от безделья"	2017	—	Скромные Апартаменты
"Летние дворы"	2017	—	Non-album single
"Друг"	2018	—	Non-album single
"Собутыльник"	2018	—	Non-album single
"Бесплатный вход"	2018	—	Non-album single
"Культ тела"	2019	—	Шоу-бизнес
"Дурачок"	2019	—	Шоу-бизнес
"Сотка (В кармане зимней куртки)"	2019	—	Non-album single
"Боль"	2019	—	SEND NUDES
"Лузер блюз"	2020	—	Non-album single
"Не Станет Хитом"	2020	—	Non-album single
"На старых сидениях кинотеатра 2"	2021	—	Танцы По Расчёту 2
"Ушёл в себя"	2021	—	Танцы По Расчёту 2
"Там где ты"	2021	—	Non-album single
"Не вижу её"	2021	—	Non-album single
"Бесконтактное общение"	2022	—	Non-album single
"Спортивные очки 2"	2022	—	Музей устаревшего искусства
"Пульс Стучит"	2022	—	Non-album single
"Sigma"	2023	—	Ожидание/Реальность
"Бармен"	2023	—	Ожидание/Реальность
"Ужин с вампиром"	2023	—	Non-album single
"Б9"	2024	—	Non-album single
"Провинциальный неформал"	2024	—	Non-album single
"Что-то с чем-то"	2024	—	Non-album single
"Ложь"	2024	—	Non-album single
"Весна"	2025	—	Non-album single
"Кофейная Ломка"	2025	—	Ткстуры
"Криминальные Разборки"	2025	—	Ткстуры
"Будь Моей Куклой"	2026	—	Non-album single
"Терапевтический Зффект"	2026	—	Non-album single
"—" denotes a recording that did not chart or was not released in that territory.

== Music videos ==
- 2016 — Страсть к курению
- 2016 — Шаги
- 2017 — Усталость от безделья
- 2017 — Упал
- 2017 — Летние дворы
- 2017 — Твоя фигура
- 2018 — Я люблю людей лишь в фильмах
- 2018 — Тупой
- 2018 — Нет любви
- 2019 — На старых сидениях кинотеатра
- 2019 — Дурачок
- 2020 — Изоляция в квартире
- 2020 — Грустно с тобой
- 2021 — Короткий роман
- 2021 — Ушёл в себя

== See also ==
- Ploho
- Molchat Doma
- Kino (band)
