= Belaya Polosa =

Belaya Polosa Белая Полоса

Studio album by Molchat Doma
- Released: 6 September 2024
- Genres: Post-punk; cold wave; new wave; synth-pop
- Length: 48:11
- Language: Russian
- Label: Sacred Bones
- Producer: Roman Komogortsev (Note: Credited for recording and mixing.)

Molchat Doma chronology
Monument (2020)	Belaya Polosa; Белая Полоса (2024)

Singles from Belaya Polosa
- 1. "Сон" Released: 11 June 2024; 2. "Ты Же Не Знаешь Кто Я" Released: 16 July 2024; 3. "Белая Полоса" Released: 7 August 2024

Belaya Polosa (Russian: Белая Полоса, ”White Stripe") is the fourth studio album by Belarusian post-punk band Molchat Doma, first released on 6 September 2024 through Sacred Bones Records. The album was written and recorded in Los Angeles following the band's relocation from Minsk, and continued the “coldwave” style of its predecessors. It was promoted with the singles “Son,” “Ty Zhe Ne Znaesh Kto Ya,” and “Belaya Polosa," as well as a 60-date world tour. Upon release, Belaya Polosa received generally favorable reviews from critics.

The album cover art portrays the unrealized conceptual design "Palazzo dell'acqua e della Luce" (Italian for 'Palace of Water and Light') designed by Italian architect Pier Luigi Nervi around the year 1940. Nervi's family has given Molchat Doma explicit permission to use the design for Belaya Polosa.

== Track listing ==
All tracks are written by Molchat Doma.

No.	Title	Length
1.	"Ты Же Не Знаешь Кто Я (Ty Zhe Ne Znaesh' Kto Ya, "You Don't Know Who I Am")"	4:58
2.	"Колесом (Kolesom, "Wheel")"	4:24
3.	"Сон (Son, "Dream")"	6:07
4.	"Белая Полоса (Belaya Polosa, ”White Stripe")"	4:54
5.	"Безнадежный Вальс (Beznadezhnyy Val's, "Hopeless Waltz")"	3:12
6.	"Черные Цветы (Chernye Cvety, "Black Flowers")"	5:00
7.	"III"	4:32
8.	"Не Вдвоем (Ne Vdvoem, "Not Together")"	4:51
9.	"Я Так Устал (Ya Tak Ustal, "I'm so tired")"	5:00
10.	"Зимняя (Zimnyaya, "Winter")"
Total length:		48:11

== Credits ==
- Egor Shkutko – vocals
- Roman Komogortsev – guitar, synthesizer, drum machine programming, production, design
- Pavel Kozlov – bass, synthesizer
- Andrei Babrouka – record, mastering, mixing
- Pavel Tretyak – female voice arrangement (track 7)
- Maria Metelskaya (aka MARFA) – backing vocals (track 7)
- Alina Pasok – photography
- Karim Belkasemi – photography
