= Nikolai Komyagin =

Russian poet and musician

Nikolai Komyagin Николай Комягин
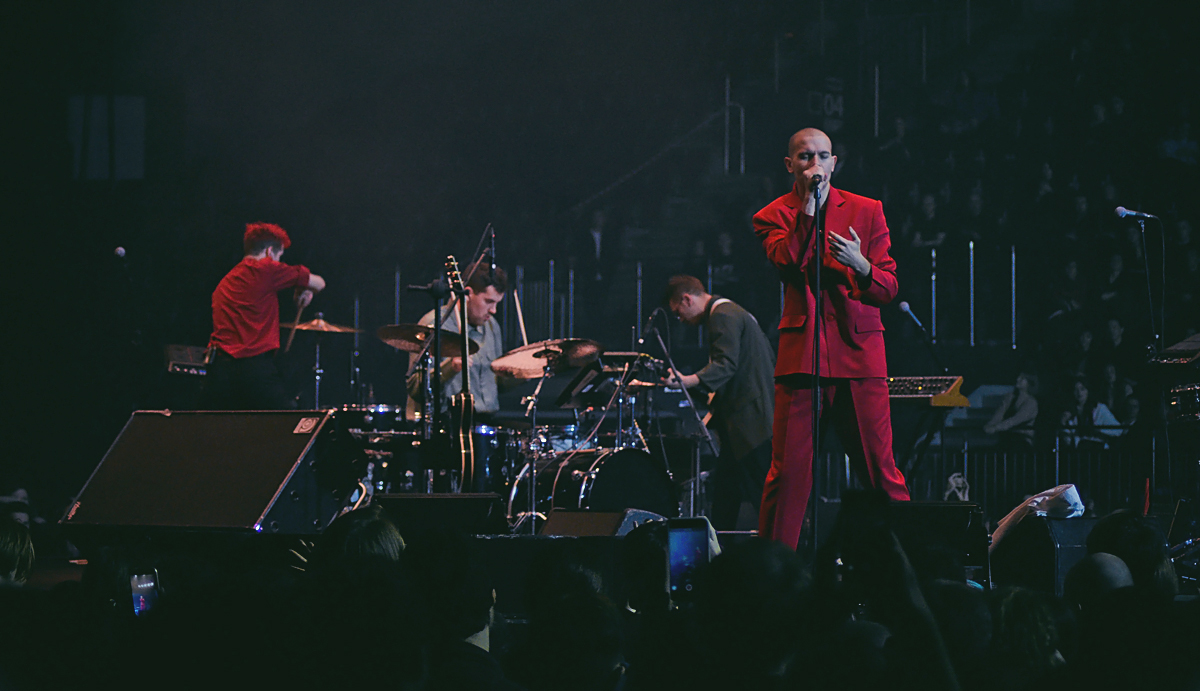
- Komyagin performing with Shortparis in 2019

Background information
- Born: 31 January 1987; Novokuznetsk, Kemerovo Oblast, Russia
- Died: 20 February 2026 (aged 39)
- Years active: 2003–2026
- Formerly of: Shortparis, Fools On Time Square, Пол-Седьмого Ноября, Плохая Идея, Sound Wave

Nikolai Vladimirovich Komyagin (Russian: Николай Владимирович Комягин; 31 January 1987 – 20 February 2026) was a Russian poet and musician, best known for being the vocalist of the experimental band Shortparis. He also worked as an actor.

== Biography ==
Komyagin was born in Novokuznetsk on 31 January 1987.

Shortparis was established by Alexander Ionin, Pavel Lesnikov and Komyagin in Saint Petersburg in 2012, with Komyagin taking on the roles of lead singer, keyboard player, and the group's primary creative force. The band later became known for their distinctive fusion of folk, pop, post-punk, avant-garde rock, and electronica. Though appreciated in niche cultural circles, Shortparis broke into wider public awareness only after the 2018 release of the politically charged video "Strashno," ("Scary") which aptly explores themes of social anxieties and neo-Nazism in Russia and drew international attention.

Komyagin's band appeared in Kirill Serebrennikov's film Leto ("Summer", 2018), performing a cover of David Bowie's "All the Young Dudes." His biggest acting role was playing the Russian poet Vladimir Mayakovsky in the series Карамора (2022) by Danila Kozlovsky.

In 2019, the band performed at Liverpool Sound City and The Great Escape Festival.

Komyagin died on 20 February 2026. No cause of death was given. He is buried in the Smolensky Cemetery in Saint Petersburg.

== Political views ==
During the first weeks of the 2022 Russian invasion of Ukraine, Shortparis released a music video for the song "Яблонный сад" ("Apple Orchard") protesting the war. In the video the band is performing an alternative version of the song together with the F.M. Kozlov Veteran's Choir.

== Reception ==
Komyagin was described as one of the most uncompromising and gifted figures in contemporary Russian music. He played an important role in Russian alternative culture over the past decade.

According to Meduza critic Lev Gankin, Komaygin's performances and recordings combined thunderous beats, striking visual elements, and visceral stage presence to evoke physical and emotional responses, making "beautiful" and "terrifying" inseparable aspects of the artistic identity. The sound and imagery drew on influences from totalitarian spectacle and contemporary Russian social reality, inviting multiple interpretations without prescribing a singular political or ideological reading. Komyagin's artistic approach was described as prioritizing experiential immersion over explicit narrative, situating Shortparis at the intersection of avant-garde expression and cultural critique.

Stepan Kazaryan characterized Komyagin not just as a talented musician but as a "genius," highlighting his singular approach to music, performance and visual art that repeatedly defied genre boundaries and engaged audiences on visceral, conceptual levels. Under his leadership, Shortparis's live shows and self-produced videos were noted for their intensity and originality, contributing to the group's reputation as one of the most compelling live acts in Europe and solidifying Komyagin's influence on contemporary alternative music culture.

== Filmography ==
Year	Film	Role
2018	Leto ("Summer")	
2019	Complex Subject (Short)	Evgueni
2022	Karamora (TV series)	Vladimir Mayakovsky
2024	Limonov: The Ballad	
