= Shortparis =

Russian music band

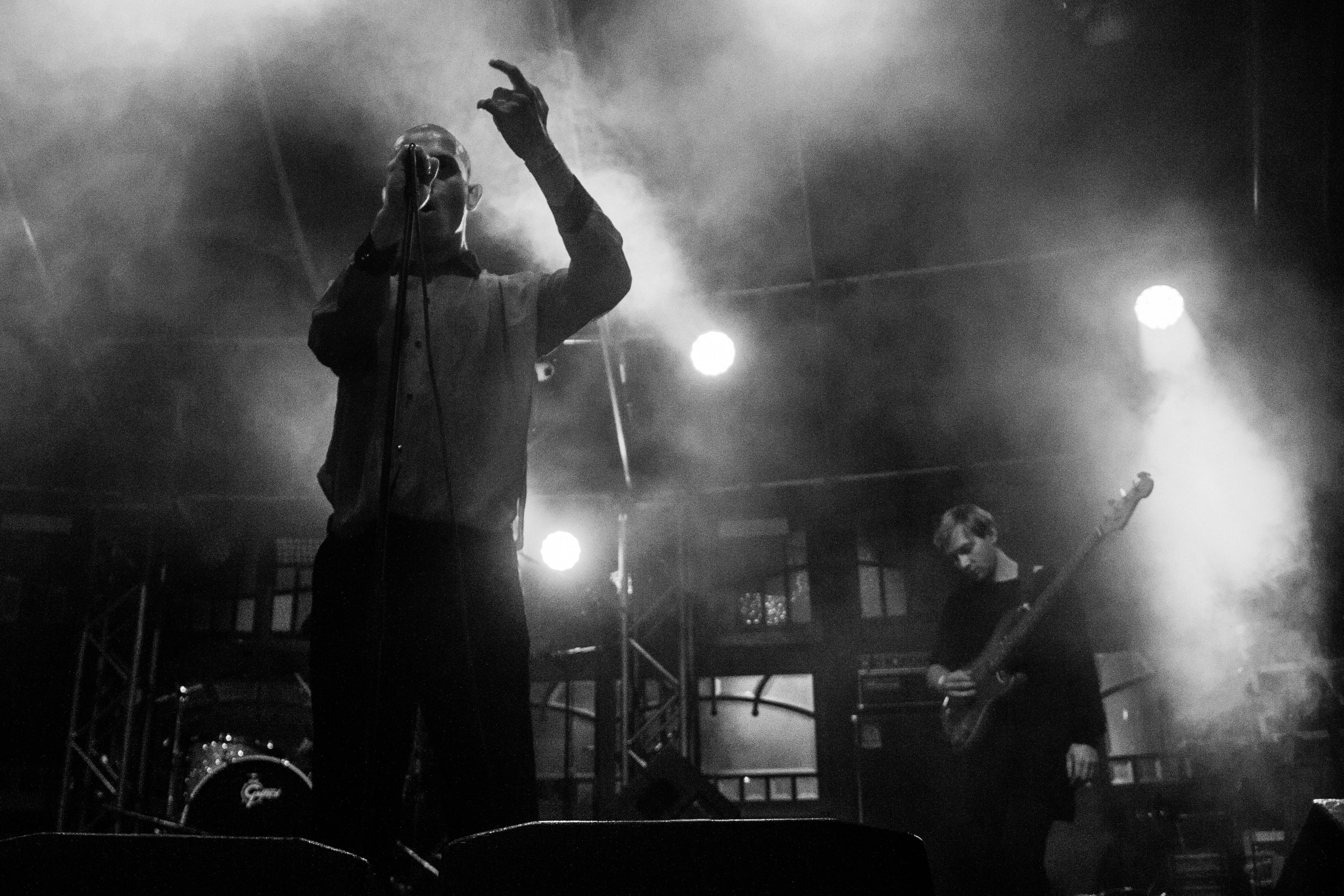
- Shortparis at Haldern Pop 2018

Background information
- Origin: Saint Petersburg, Russia
- Genres: Electronic music, avant-pop, dark wave, art punk
- Years active: 2011–present
- Labels: Fenix Music; Universal Music Russia
- Members: Alexander Ionin; Pavel Lesnikov; Danila Kholodkov
- Past members: Nikolai Komyagin; Alexander Galyanov
- Website: shortparis.com

Shortparis is a Russian experimental music band formed in Saint Petersburg in 2011.

== History ==
Nikolai Komyagin, Alexander Ionin, and Pavel Lesnikov met in their hometown, Novokuznetsk, and formed Shortparis in 2011 upon moving to Saint Petersburg. They were later joined by St. Petersburg natives Danila Kholodkov and Alexander Galyanov.

In 2013, Shortparis released their debut album Docheri (Russian: «Дочери», lit. 'Daughters'), with songs in English and French. In 2017, they released the album Paskha (Russian: «Пасха», lit. 'Easter'). In contrast to their previous album, all of the songs on Paskha are in Russian. In 2019, Shortparis released their third album, Tak zakalyalas' stal (Russian: «Так закалялась сталь», lit. 'Thus the Steel Was Tempered').

In September 2020, Shortparis released the single "KoKoKo / Struktury ne vykhodyat na ulitsy" (Russian: «КоКоКо / Cтруктуры не выходят на улицы», lit. 'CluckCluckCluck (Structures Don't Take To The Streets)') and an accompanying music video. The title of the track refers to a piece of graffiti from the 1968 Paris riots.

In January 2021, Shortparis contributed a track to the album Sokhrani moyu rech' navsegda (Russian: «Сохрани мою речь навсегда», lit. 'Keep My Words Forever'), a compilation of songs based on Osip Mandelstam's work, released in honor of the 130th anniversary of the poet's birth.

In June 2021, Shortparis released their fourth studio album, Yablonny sad (Russian: «Яблонный сад», lit. 'Apple Orchard').

During the 2022 Russian invasion of Ukraine, Shortparis released a music video protesting against war.

On 20 February 2026, it was revealed that the band's frontman Nikolai Komyagin had died at the age of 39. He reportedly felt sick after a boxing workout, and shortly after, his heart stopped.

== Live performances ==
Shortparis opened for The Kooks in 2015 and alt-J in 2017 at Saint Petersburg's A2. The band started gaining attention in English-language music publications for their performances at Haldern Pop Festival, MENT Festival, OFF Festival, Pop-Kultur Berlin, and Station Narva Festival in 2018. In April 2018, Shortparis performed alongside Kazuskoma, Spasibo, Glintshake, and Elektroforez in Minsk, Warsaw, Poznan, Berlin, and Kaliningrad as part of a tour showcasing Russian bands. In May 2019, Shortparis undertook their first UK tour, including performances at Liverpool Sound City and The Great Escape Festival. In August 2019, they played at Brave! Factory Festival in Kyiv.

== Musical style ==
Shortparis performs songs in Russian, French, and English. According to John Doran of The Quietus, Shortparis is following in Sergey Kuryokhin's legacy of provocative performance art; Doran describes the group as "Ambitious, bombastic, incredibly pretentious, erotic, thrilling, impossible to pin down, vaguely deviant, fun to dance to and full of revolutionary potential".

== Members ==
=== Current line-up ===
- Alexander Ionin – bass, guitar, bayan (2011–present)
- Pavel Lesnikov – drums, sampling (2011–present)
- Danila Kholodkov – percussion, drums (2012–present), backing vocals (2018–present), bass (2023–present)

=== Former members ===
- Nikolai Komyagin – vocals (2011–2026), keyboards (2022–2026; his death)
- Alexander Galyanov – keyboards, guitar, backing vocals (2014–2022)

== Discography ==
=== Studio albums ===
- 2013 — Docheri (Russian: «Дочери», lit. 'Daughters')
- 2017 — Paskha (Russian: «Пасха», lit. 'Easter')
- 2019 — Tak zakalyalas stal (Russian: «Так закалялась сталь», lit. 'Thus the Steel Was Tempered')
- 2021 — Yablonny sad (Russian: «Яблонный сад», lit. 'Apple Orchard')
- 2026 — Iliada (Russian: «Илиада», lit. 'Iliad')

=== EPs/mini-albums ===
- 2013 — The Daughters (B-Sides)
- 2022 — Zov ozera (Russian: «Зов озера», lit. 'The Call of the Lake') (soundtrack for the theatre play "Берегите ваши лица" ("Take Care of Your Faces"))
- 2022 — NOVOE NOVOE (Russian: «НОВОЕ НОВОЕ», lit. 'NEW NEW')
- 2023 — Grozdya gneva (Russian: «Гроздья гнева», lit. 'The Grapes of Wrath')
- 2025 — Rodnaya zemlya aka Limonov: The Ballad (Russian: «Родная земля», lit. 'Native Land') (soundtrack for the movie "Лимонов. Баллада" ("Limonov: The Ballad"))

=== Singles ===
- 2012 — Amsterdam
- 2015 — Novokuznetsk (Russian: «Новокузнецк»)
- 2015 — Ma Russie
- 2017 — Tutu (Russian: «Туту»)
- 2018 — Styd (Russian: «Стыд», lit. 'Shame')
- 2018 — Strashno (Russian: «Страшно», lit. 'Scary')
- 2020 — KoKoKo / Struktury ne vykhodyat na ulitsy (Russian: «КоКоКо / Cтруктуры не выходят на улицы», lit. 'CluckCluckCluck / Structures Don't Take to the Streets')
- 2021 — Govorit Moskva (Russian: «Говорит Москва», lit. 'Moscow Speaking')
- 2023 — O, kak nebo cherno / Shire Volgi (Russian: «О, как небо черно / Шире Волги», lit. 'Oh, How the Sky Is Black / Wider Than the Volga')
- 2023 — V pervy raz (Russian: «В первый раз», lit. 'For the First Time')
- 2023 — Grozdya gneva (Russian: «Гроздья гнева», lit. 'The Grapes of Wrath')

== Awards and nominations ==
Shortparis made the shortlist for GQ Russia's "Discovery of the Year" award in 2019. At the 2019 Jager Music Awards, Shortparis won Band of the Year, as well as Single of the Year and Video of the Year for "Strashno" (Russian: «Страшно», lit. 'Scary').

== Media appearances ==
Shortparis appeared in the 2018 film Leto (Russian: Лето, lit. 'Summer'), performing a cover of David Bowie's "All the Young Dudes". In 2019, their song "Chto-to osoboe vo mne" (Russian: Что-то особое во мне) featured in the episode "Chapter 4: SYZYGY" of season 2 of The OA. In 2019 they were nominated in the Best Director category at the Berlin Music Video Awards, for their work 'Scary'.
