= Ploho =

Russian band

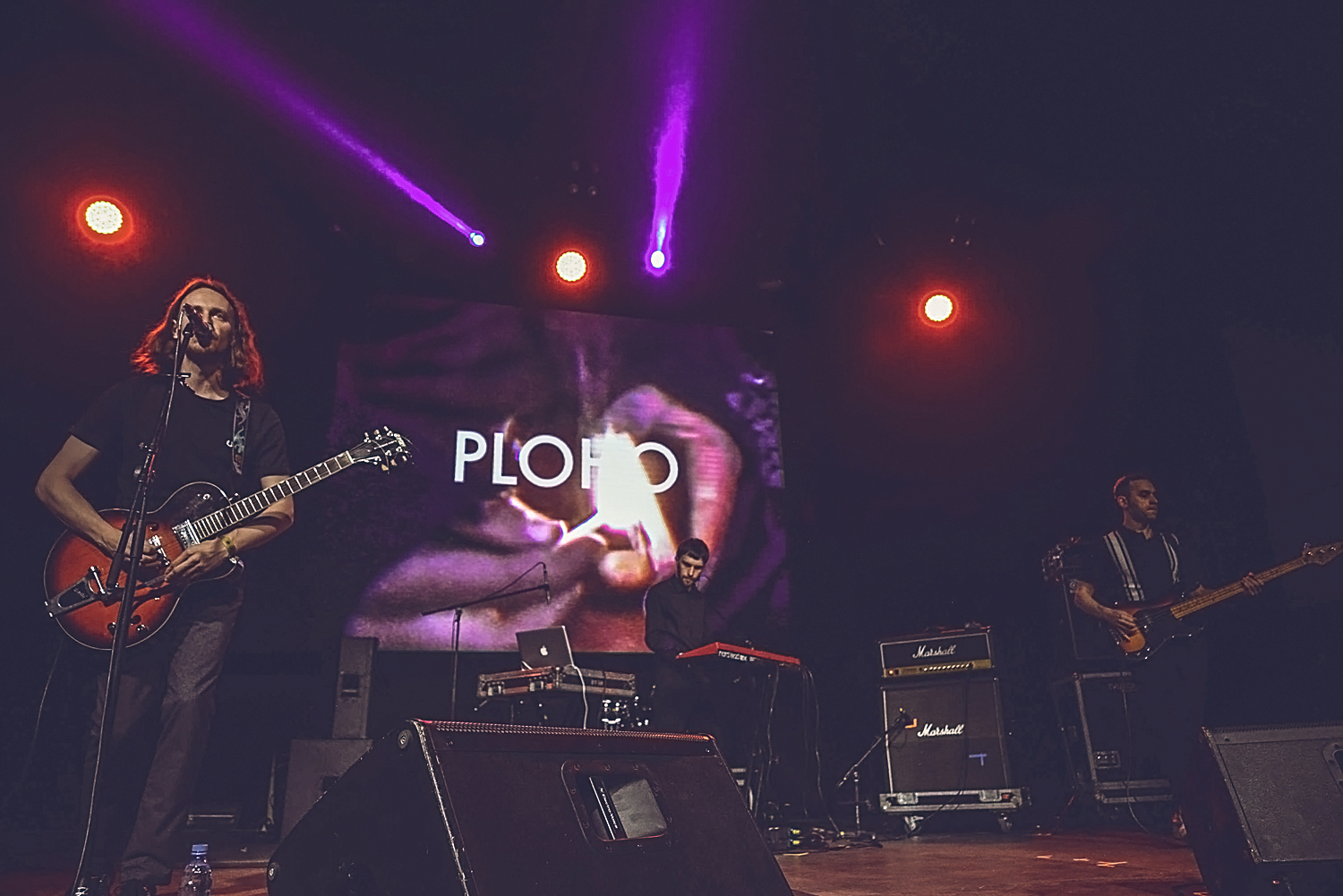

Background information
- Origin: Novosibirsk, Russia
- Genres: Post-punk, Cold wave
- Years active: 2013–present
- Labels: RDS; Sierpien; Artoffact
- Members: Viktor Uzhakov; Andrei Smorgonsky; Igor Starshinov

Ploho (Russian for "bad") (Note: From Russian: плохо, romanized: plokho.) is a Russian post-punk band from Novosibirsk, formed in 2013.

== History ==
The group was established in Novosibirsk in 2013. In an interview with Post-Punk.com the band cited growing up in the "rather cold and dark time" of "total crime and chaos" of Russia in the 1990s as drawing the band members towards punk music from an early age. Most influential to the band in this period was the seminal Soviet 80s post punk band Kino.

In 2018, the American radio station XRAY.fm listed the band's album Kuda ptitsy uletayut umirat (Russian: Куда птицы улетают умирать, lit. 'Where the birds fly away to die') in their ranking of the top 25 best albums of the year.

In June 2020, the band signed with Canadian record label Artoffact Records. In February 2021, the band released Fantomniye chuvstva (Russian: Фантомные Чувства, lit. 'Phantom Feelings').

The band relocated to Serbia in March 2022 after the Russian invasion of Ukraine.

== Studio albums ==
Year	Original title	Translated title
2014	Смирение и отрицание	Humility and denial
2014	Добрая песня	Kind song
2015	Новостройки	New buildings
2016	Культура доминирования	Dominance culture
2016	Тот, кто гасит свет	One who puts out the light
2016	Хотеть тепла	To want warmth
2017	Бумажные бомбы	Paper bombs
2018	Куда птицы улетают умирать	Where the birds fly away to die
2019	Пыль	Dust
2021	Фантомные Чувства	Phantom Feelings
2022	Когда душа спит	When the soul sleeps
2024	Почва	Soil

== Cameo role in Isaac ==
The group made a cameo in the film Isaac from the Lithuanian director Jurgis Matulevičius. They cameo as a band during a scene and play their songs "Crosses" and "Down".

== See also ==
- Buerak
- Molchat Doma
