= Agent Side Grinder =

Swedish industrial rock band

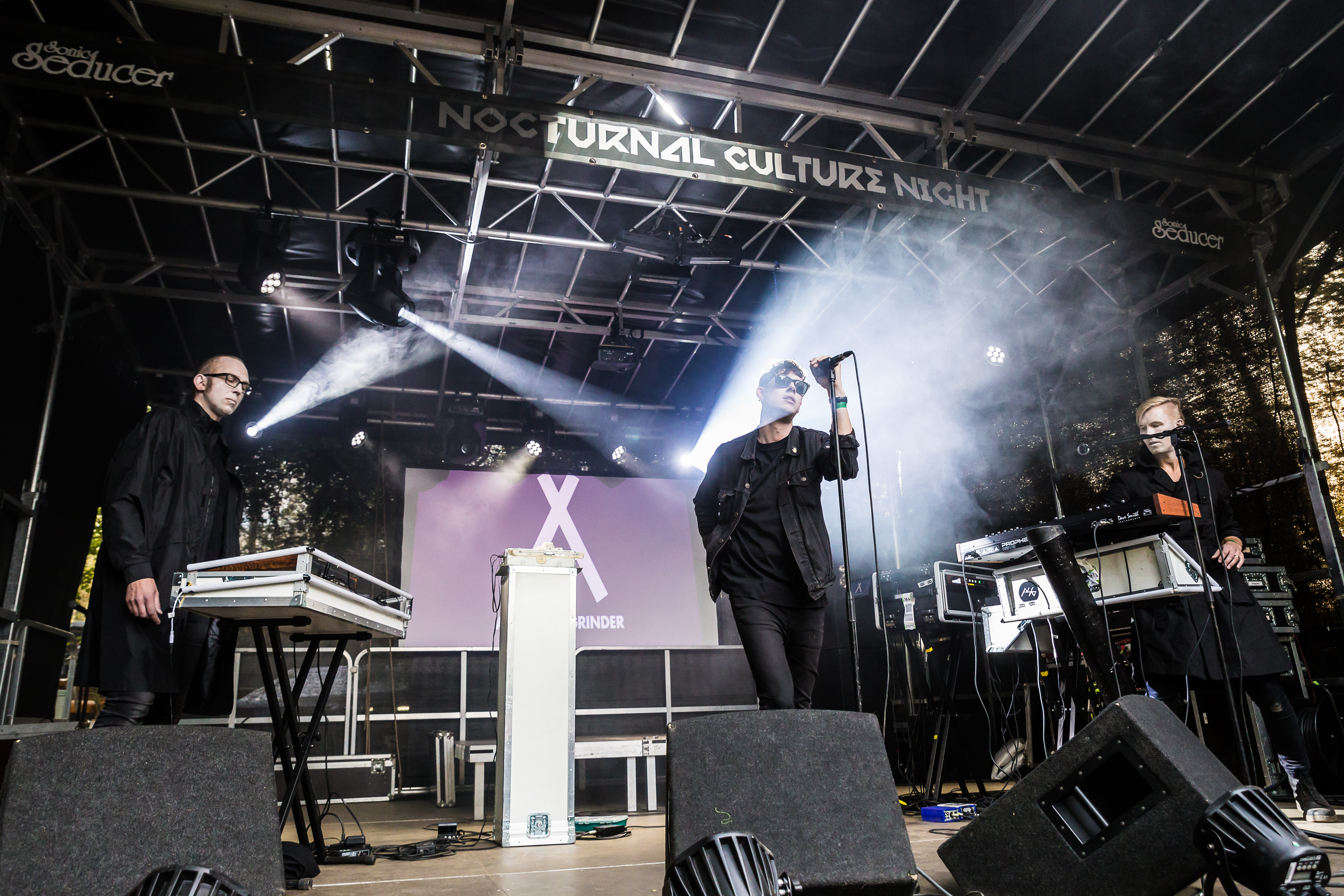
- Agent Side Grinder at Nocturnal Culture Night 2018 in Germany.

Background information
- Origin: Stockholm, Sweden
- Genres: Electronica, post-punk, industrial, darkwave
- Years active: 2005–present
- Labels: Enfant Terrible, Hästen & Korset, Klangarkivet, Energy Rekords, Complete Control Productions, Progress Productions, Oráculo Records, Kollaps Records, Wave Tension Records
- Members: Johan Lange; Peter Fristedt; Emanuel Åström
- Past members: Aleksander Blomqvist; Kristoffer Grip; Henrik Sunbring; Thobias Eidevald
- Website: www.agentsidegrinder.com

Agent Side Grinder is a Swedish electronic band from Bromma, Stockholm, which was formed in 2005. The band has made seven albums and two remix albums, they've toured extensively throughout Europe.

== History ==
Agent Side Grinder's first two albums, Agent Side Grinder (2008) and Irish Recording Tape (2009) were rooted in post-punk, industrial and dark electro.

Their third album Hardware (2012) showed a bigger and more textured sound. It was named "album of the month" in Vice Magazine, topped several annual "best of-lists" including Dagens Nyheter, Metro and Time Out Paris and won the Manifest-award (Swedish indie-grammy) for best synth album in 2013. also on the album were Swedish musicians Skriet and Henric de la Cour.

In 2015 they released Alkimia, a dramatic and melodic album that exceeded the success of "Hardware" (another Manifest win). The album contains a guest appearance by Nicole Sabouné.

After Kristoffer Grip, Henrik Sunbring and Thobias Eidevald decided to leave the band in 2017, Johan Lange and Peter Fristedt together with new singer Emanuel Åström returned in 2019 with their comeback album A/X.

Agent Side Grinder has done seven European tours and played festivals such as M'era Luna Festival, Wave-Gotik-Treffen, The Great Escape, Eurosonic, Les Transmusicales de Rennes, Entremurahlas, Bimfest, Drop Dead Festival and Arvikafestivalen. They have opened for bands such as Suicide and Laibach and collaborated with artists like Dirk Ivens, Kite and Henric de la Cour.

In 2020 the band released a second version of A/X titled 'REMA/X'. The album features 13 tracks, the majority of the tracks being remixes of songs from the previous album. REMA/X features remixes from bands such as Ash Code, She Pleasures Herself and many more. The album also includes a new song from Agent Side Grinder titled 'The Archives'.

In 2023 Agent Side Grinder released the album 'Jack Vegas' consisting of 8 new tracks. The album won the award for 'best synth' in the 2024 Manifestgalan Awards, this marks the bands third time winning the award and fourth time being nominated.

== Members ==
Current members

- Johan Lange – synthesizer, keyboard, programming, percussion, backing vocals
- Peter Fristedt – modular synthesizer, tape loops
- Emanuel Åström – vocals

Former members

- Alexander Blomqvist – bass guitar (2007–2011)
- Henrik Sunbring – synthesizer (2007–2017)
- Kristoffer Grip – vocals
- Thobias Eidevald – bass guitar (2011–2017)
Agent Side Grinder, Line-up live at Nocturnal Culture Night 2018 in Deutzen

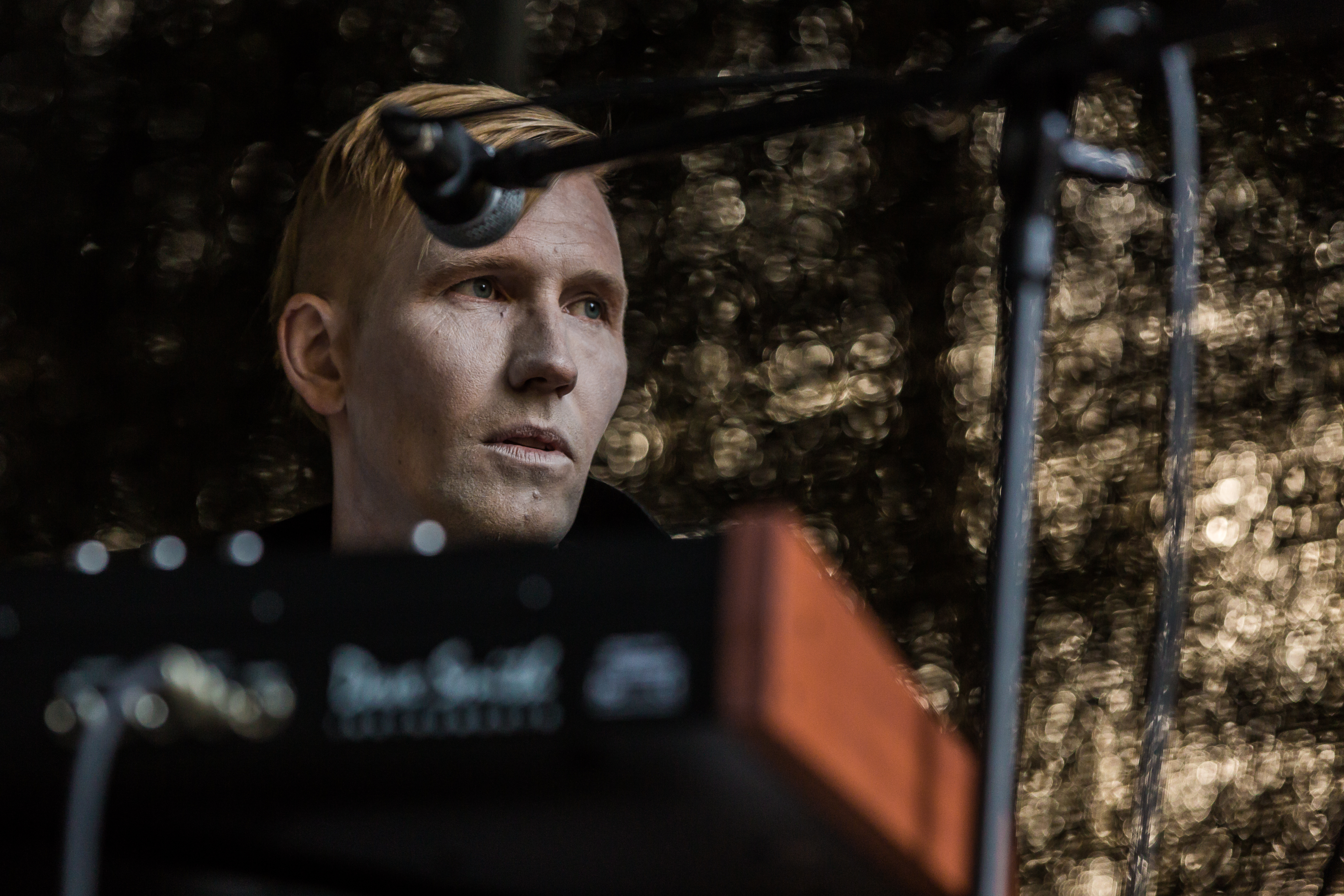
Johan Lange

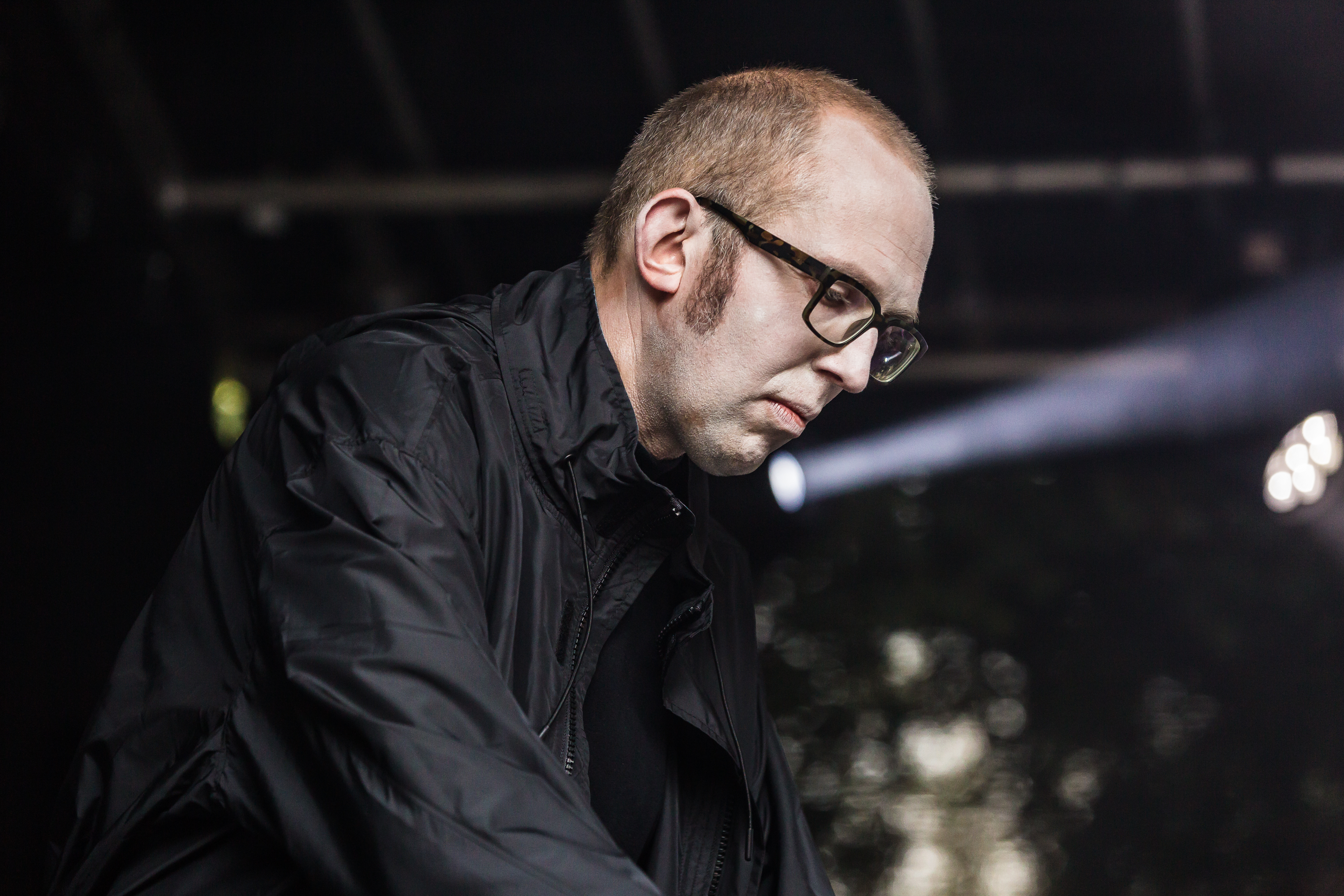
Peter Fristedt

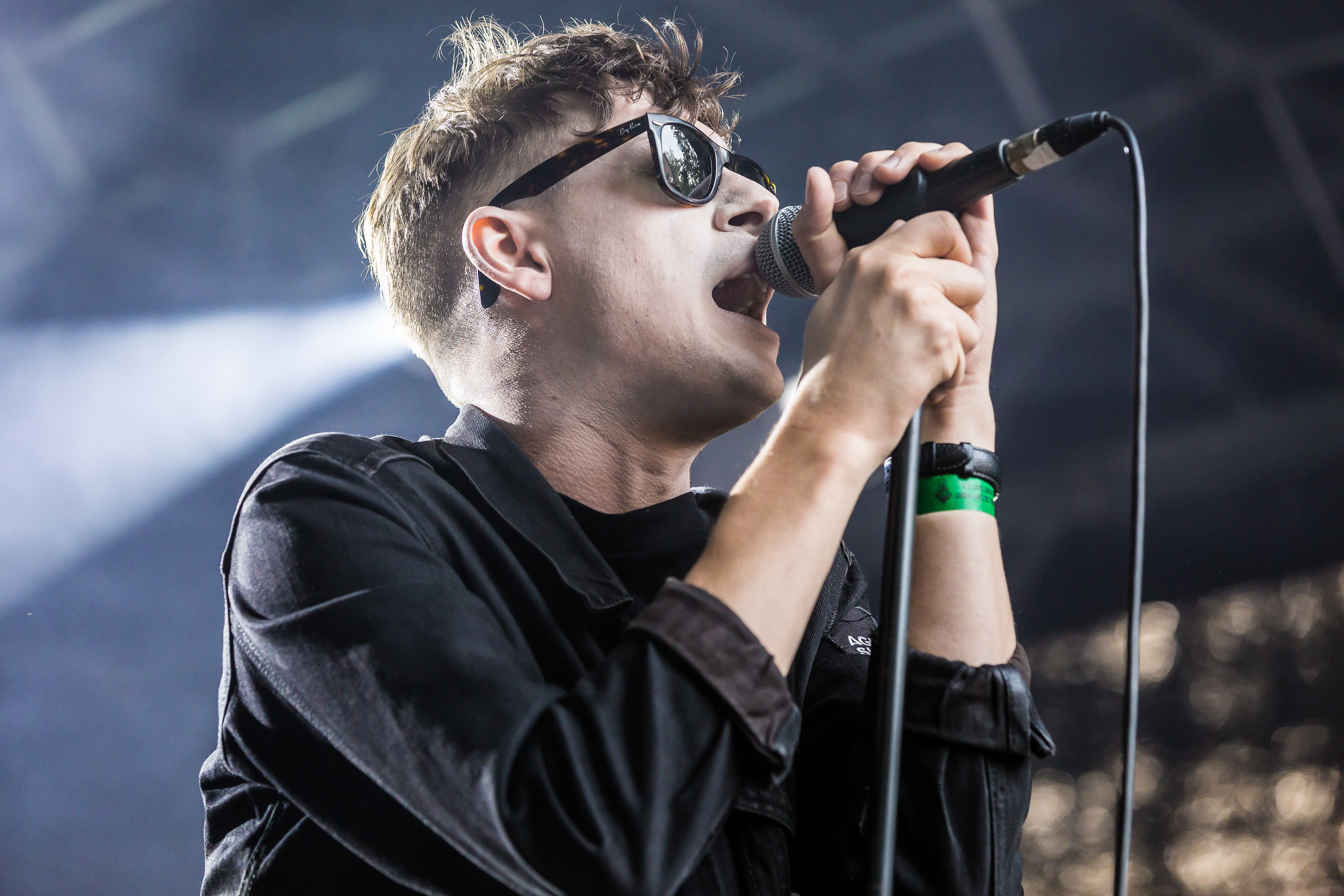
Emanuel Åström

== Discography ==
Studio albums
Title	Format	Year	Label
Agent Side Grinder	LP	2008	Enfant Terrible
Agent Side Grinder	CD	2010	Kill Shaman
Agent Side Grinder	LP reissue	2011	Energy Rekords
The Transatlantic Tape Project	Tape	2009	Hästen & Korset
The Transatlantic Tape Project	LP	2009	Enfant Terrible
Irish Recording Tape	LP	2009	Enfant Terrible
Irish Recording Tape	CD	2010	Klangarkivet
Irish Recording Tape	LP reissue	2016	Progress Productions
Hardware	CD	2012	Klangarkivet
Hardware	Tape	2012	Klangarkivet
Hardware	LP	2012	Energy Rekords
Hardware (SFTWR included)	2xCD	2013	Artoffact Records
SFTWR (Remixes)	CD	2013	Klangarkivet
Alkimia	CD	2015	Progress Productions
Alkimia	LP	2015	Progress Productions
A/X	CD	2019	Progress Productions
A/X	LP	2019	Progress Productions
REMA/X (Remixes)	CD	2020	Progress Productions
Jack Vegas	CD	2023	Progress Productions

Live albums
Title	Format	Live Date	Year	Label
Live at TMPL	Tape	June 9, 2007	2007	Self Released
Live at Delicious Goldfish Records	Tape	June 10, 2007	2007	Self Released
Two Nights With ASG	Tape	October 24, 2008 & October 25, 2008	2008	Self Released
Live in Paris 2009-10-02	Tape	October 2, 2009	2010	Self Released
Industrial Beauty	Tape	Spring 2010	2010	Self Released
Industrial Beauty	CD	Spring 2010	2011	Manic Depression
Live in Switzerland (with Suicide)	Tape	September 4, 2010	2010	Klangarkivet
Live Targets	Tape	March 2012	2012	Klangarkivet
Hardware Comes Alive	CD	May 17, 2012	2012	Complete Control Productions
Live in Brussels 2012-12-08 (with unhappybirthday)	Tape	December 8, 2012	2013	Self Released

Singles
Title	Format	Year	Label
Untitled	7"	2007	Enfant Terrible
Wolf Hour	CD Promo	2011	Klangarkivet
Go (Bring It) Back (with Dirk Ivens)	12"	2014	Kollaps Records
This Is Us	12"	2014	Progress Productions
Rip Me	12"	2015	Oráculo Records
Doppelgänger	7"	2018	Progress Productions
Stripdown	USB	2018	Progress Productions

Compilation album
Title	Format	Year	Label
Industrial Beauty	CD	2011	Manic Depression
Industrial Beauty Extended	CD	2016	Manic Depression

Compilation album various
Title	Format	Song	Year	Label
Hoera! Een Hex Voor Thuis!	LP	In Line With Me (Compressed Version)	2007	Hex Grammofoonplaten
Festival Der Genialen Dissidenten	LP + 7"	There Is A Sound That Always Goes Out	2008	Enfant Terrible
Darkness Before Dawn Volume 3	CD	Die To Live (Darkness Before Dawn Edit)	2011	UpScene
Dödgrävardisko – En Samling Svensk Elektronik 1980–2012	Tape	Billy	2012	Dödsdans Rekords
Inside The Volcano Volume One	CD	Life in Advance (Crash Course in Science Remix)	2013	Complete Control Productions
My Precious! A Waves Radio Show Compilation 1	LP	Giants Fall (Kinex Kinex remix)	2016	Red Maze Records
Spring Equinox	Digital	Into The Wild (Kill Shelter Remix)	2017	Unknown Pleasures Records
30 Years Of Black Celebration – A Compilation Of Exclusive Depeche Mode Cover Versions	CD	A Question Of Time	2016	Sonic Seducer
Det Är Grymt I Norr	LP	Doppelgänger (Person:A Remix)	2018	Electronic Emergencies
We Are Electric: Gary Numan Revisited	LP	I'm An Agent	2018	Wave Tension Records
Absolute Body Control – 1980/2020	3xLP	Love at First Sight	2020	Oraculo Records
