= Molchat Doma =

Belarusian band

Molchat Doma Молчат Дома
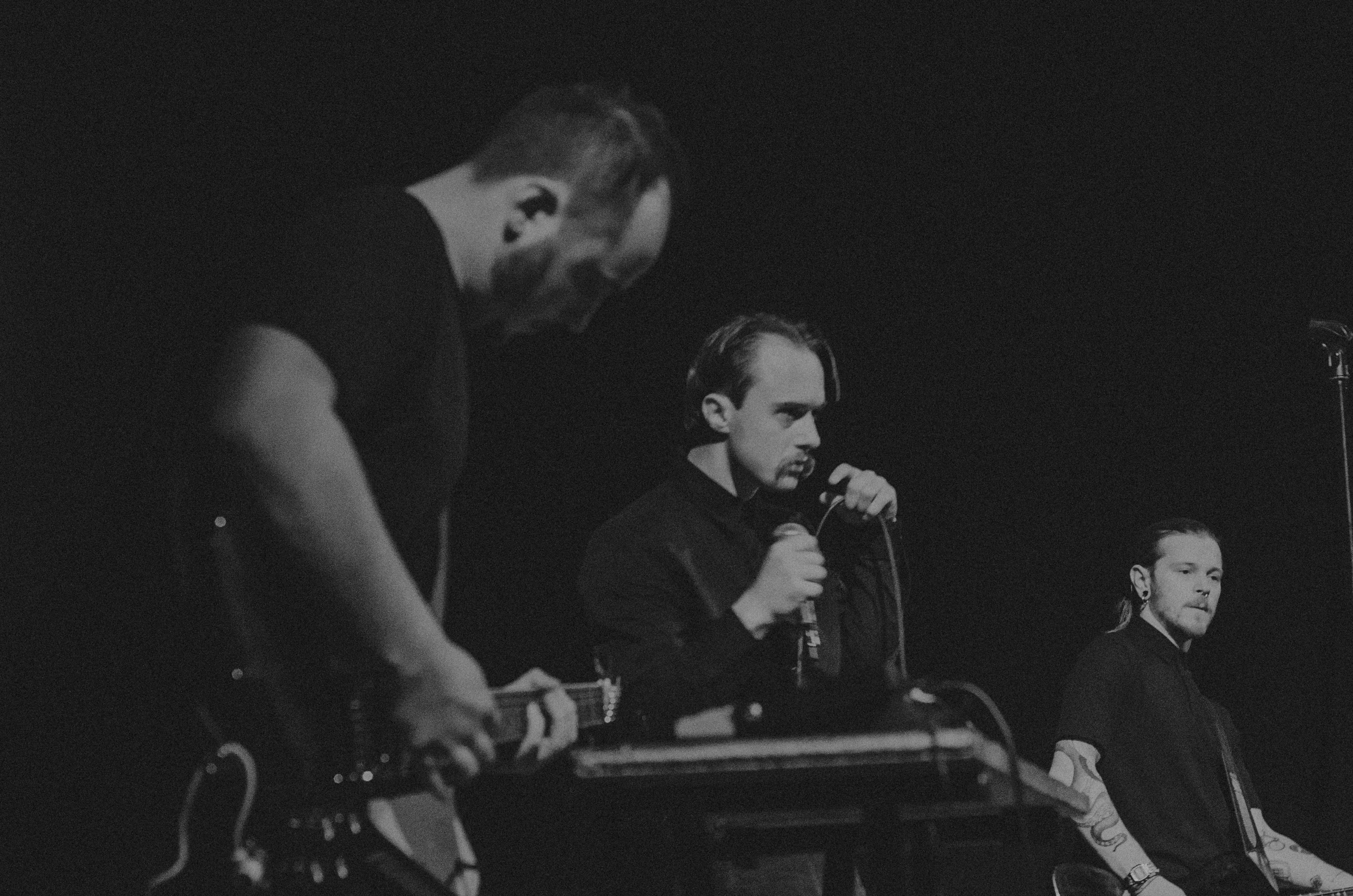
- Molchat Doma performing in Lithuania in 2019

Background information
- Origin: Minsk, Belarus
- Genres: Post-punk; dark wave; new wave; synth-pop; cold wave; minimal wave
- Years active: 2017–present
- Labels: Sacred Bones; Detriti
- Members: Egor Shkutko; Roman Komogortsev; Pavel Kozlov
- Website: molchatdoma.com

Molchat Doma (Russian: Молчат Дома, lit. 'Houses are silent', pronounced [mɐlˈt͡ɕat dɐˈma]) is a Belarusian band from Minsk, formed in 2017. Its current lineup is Egor Shkutko (vocals), Roman Komogortsev (guitar, synthesizer, drum machine), and Pavel Kozlov (bass guitar, synthesizer). Its style has been called post-punk, new wave, synth-pop, and cold wave.

Molchat Doma self-released its first album, S krysh nashikh domov (С крыш наших домов, 'From The Roofs of Our Houses') in 2017 and released its second album, Etazhi (Этажи, 'Floors') in 2018, through German independent label Detriti Records. After gaining popularity worldwide, in 2020, they signed to American independent label Sacred Bones Records, which reissued its albums, marking its first releases in North America. Its third studio album, Monument (Монумент), was released on 13 November 2020, and its fourth, Belaya Polosa (Белая полоса, 'White Stripe'), on 6 September 2024.

== History ==
=== Foundation, S krysh nashikh domov and Etazhi (2017–2019) ===
Molchat Doma formed in Minsk, the capital of Belarus, and began releasing music in 2017. It self-released its debut studio album, S krysh nashikh domov (Russian: С крыш наших домов, 'From The Roofs of Our Houses'), on 24 April 2017. In July 2017, it released the song Kommersanty (Коммерсанты, 'Businessmen') as a single. Later that year, S krysh nashikh domov was re-released by German independent label Detriti Records. On 7 September 2018, the band released its second album, Etazhi (Этажи, 'Floors'), which included Kommersanty, also through Detriti. The label released the album digitally and on vinyl.

Over time, the band's first two albums gained popularity through YouTube and Bandcamp. The music was uploaded to YouTube unofficially by a user named Harakiri Diat, who also uploaded music by other bands with similar sounds. By the end of 2019, Etazhi had gained roughly two million listeners through the upload of the album. The band was not initially as popular in Belarus as in the rest of Europe; it had played sold-out shows across the continent but never in Belarus. The members have said they have no interest in performing a sold-out show at Minsk-Arena. In September, the band released two singles, "Zvezdy" ("Звезды", 'Stars') and "Po krayu ostrova" ("По краю острова", 'Along the Edge of the Island'), a collaboration with Russian post-punk band Ploho.

=== Signing with Sacred Bones Records and Monument (2020–2022) ===
In January 2020, Molchat Doma signed with American independent label Sacred Bones Records, who later reissued their first two albums on vinyl in North America. During the first half of 2020, the band gained popularity through the online video platform TikTok, specifically their song "Sudno (Boris Ryzhy)" (Russian: "Судно (Борис Рыжий)", 'Vessel (Boris Ryzhy)'), from Etazhi; the song had been used as the soundtrack to numerous videos created on the platform. Some notable videos that used the song include one made by a user based in San Francisco, California, who compiled several clips of his native country of Russia, adding that he misses being there, as well as a "challenge" that involves a fast photo compilation of the video creator trying on as many clothes in their wardrobe as possible within a time limit. The song's popularity during this time resulted in it reaching No. 2 on the Spotify worldwide Viral 50 chart.

Molchat Doma had planned to tour in North America for the first time, alongside American singer-songwriter Chrysta Bell, but the original tour dates were canceled once the COVID-19 pandemic had impacted the continent. The band contributed to a Black Sabbath tribute album, along with other signees of Sacred Bones, titled What Is This That Stands Before Me? They covered their song "Heaven and Hell" (Russian: "Небеса и ад"), with a dark wave sound and Russian lyrics, for the album. The album was released in May 2020, and their "Heaven and Hell" cover was released as a standalone single on digital platforms later that month.

On 15 September 2020, Molchat Doma announced their first album through Sacred Bones, titled Monument, and its release date of 13 November. Alongside the announcement was the release of the album's lead single, "Ne smeshno" ("Не смешно", 'Not Funny').

The band performed at the Coachella festival in Indio, California, on 16 and 23 April 2022.

On 20 May 2023, the band performed at the Cruel World Festival in Pasadena, California.

=== Belaya Polosa (2023–present) ===
On 18 November 2023, the band performed at the Darker Waves Festival in Huntington Beach, California with Tears for Fears, New Order, the Human League, Echo & the Bunnymen, and others.

On 11 June 2024, the band announced their fourth album through Sacred Bones, titled Belaya Polosa (White Stripe); they also premiered the first single, "Son" ("Dream"), with an accompanying music video directed by Bryan M. Ferguson. On 16 July 2024, the second single from the album was released, "Ty Zhe Ne Znaesh Kto Ya" ("You Don't Know Who I Am"), followed by the third single "Belaya Polosa" on 7 August.

During their 2024 European tour, the band recorded live renditions of the three songs "Toska" ("Yearning"), "Chernye Tsvety" ("Black Flowers"), and "Sudno" ("Bedpan") outside Zdeněk Řihák's Panorama Hotel in Štrbské Pleso, Slovakia, which featured on the cover of their album Etazhi. As well as a YouTube and digital release, the live album would see a limited-run vinyl pressing.

On 3 March 2025, the band performed live on KEXP-FM in Seattle.

== Musical style and lyrics ==
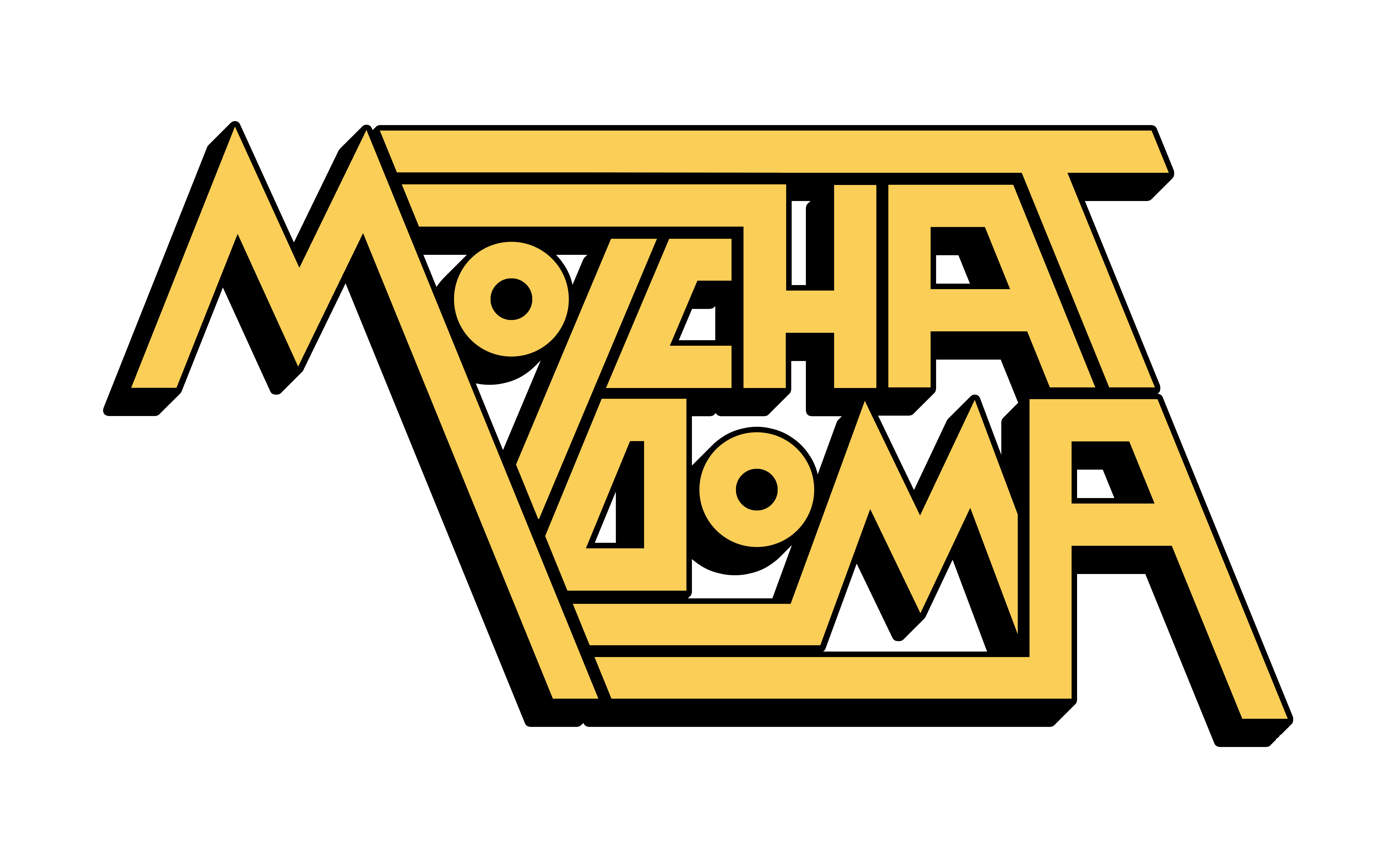
Molchat Doma's logo

Molchat Doma's members have said that they were influenced by 1980s Russian rock music from the perestroika era, especially Kino. They have also drawn comparisons to the Cure and Joy Division; Shkutko's vocal style and on-stage appearance have been described as similar to Joy Division singer Ian Curtis's. Pitchfork's Cat Zhang called Shkutko's vocals "spectral and disembodied", saying his "droning voice" is often "clouded in reverb". Molchat Doma has praised the Cure singer Robert Smith and Depeche Mode singer Dave Gahan, and enjoys the idea of having either appear at one of their shows. OMD have also been noted as an influence.

Molchat Doma described its sound as "post-punk, new wave, and darker ends of synth-pop". Writers have also called its sound post-punk, new wave, synth-pop, and cold wave. The band has no drummer, using a drum machine instead. Molchat Doma has often been connected with "doomer music", a specific type of music listened to by doomers. It typically features cold and gloomy atmospheres, sad and introspective lyrics usually focusing on loneliness, and an overall dystopian sound. Many of the band's songs have appeared on "doomer playlists" and in videos of gameplay and episodic miniseries featured from the 2017 tactical first-person shooter Escape from Tarkov on YouTube as a result; this also helped the band gain popularity on the platform.

== Members ==
- Egor Shkutko (Belarusian: Yahor Shkutko) – lead vocals, lyrics
- Roman Komogortsev (Raman Kamahortsau) – guitar, synthesizer, drum machine
- Pavel Kozlov (Pavel Kazlou) – bass guitar, synthesizer

== Political views ==
In 2020, during protests across Belarus following the country's presidential elections, the band's members supported the protesters in their VK group, and later took part in the creation of a music charity collection, For Belarus, the proceeds from which went to support the victims of the protests.

In early summer 2021, the band participated in the "Agents of Summer" music marathon, hosted by Meduza. The band expressed support for the publication, which had lost funding due to its "foreign agent" status in Russia.

In late February 2022, the band recorded a video message condemning 2022 Russian invasion of Ukraine. The musicians announced that a portion of the proceeds from their planned concerts would be donated to civilians affected by the war.

== Discography ==
=== Studio albums ===
List of studio albums
Title	Album details	Peak chart positions	
Title	Album details	US Heat.	US World
S krysh nashikh domov, «С Крыш Наших Домов»	Released: 24 April 2017; Label: Self-released (Note: S krysh nashikh domov was originally self-released by Molchat Doma but received a re-release in 2017 through Detriti Records.); Format: CD, LP, CS, DL	—	—
Etazhi, «Этажи»	Released: 7 September 2018; Label: Detriti (Note: Etazhi was originally released through Detriti Records but received a re-release in 2020 through Sacred Bones Records.); Format: CD, LP, CS, DL	—	—
Monument, «Монумент»	Released: 13 November 2020; Label: Sacred Bones; Format: CD, LP, CS, DL	21	12
Belaya Polosa, «Белая Полоса»	Released: 6 September 2024; Label: Sacred Bones; Format: CD, LP, CS, DL	—	9

=== EPs ===
List of EPs
Title	Album details	Peak chart positions	
Title	Album details	US Heat.	US World
Live at Panorama Hotel	Released: 10 January 2025; Label: Sacred Bones; Format: LP, DL	—	—
Belaya Polosa Remixes	Released: 22 August 2025; Label: Sacred Bones; Format: DL	—	—

=== Singles ===
List of singles
Title	Year	Album
"Коммерсанты" "Businessmen"	2017	Этажи; Floors
"Звезды" "Stars"	2019	—N/a
"По краю острова" "At the Edge of the Island" (with Ploho)	2019	—N/a
"Небеса и Ад" "Heaven and Hell"	2020	What Is This That Stands Before Me?
"Не смешно" "Not Funny"	2020	Монумент; Monument
"Дискотека" "Discotheque"	2020	Монумент; Monument
"Ответа нет" "No Answer"	2020	Монумент; Monument
"Мёртв внутри" "Dead Inside" (with Elektroforez)	2021	505
"Люди-инвалиды" "Handicapped People"	2022	200 по встречной (трибьют-альбом); 200 [km/h] Against the Traffic (Tribute Album)
"Сон" "Dream"	2024	Белая Полоса; Belaya Polosa
"Ты же не знаешь кто я" "You Don't Know Who I Am"	2024	Белая Полоса; Belaya Polosa
"Белая полоса" "White Stripe"	2024	Белая Полоса; Belaya Polosa

=== Other charted songs ===
Title	Year	Peak chart positions	Album
Title	Year	Spotify Viral 50	Album
"Судно (Борис Рыжий)" "Vessel (Boris Ryzhy)"	2018	2	Этажи; Floors

=== Remixes ===
- Geometric Vision – "Slowemotion" (Molchat Doma Remix)
- Antipole – "Marble" feat. Paris Alexander (Molchat Doma Remix)
- Ash Code – "Fear" (Molchat Doma Remix)
- d3adc0de – "Call Out The Liars" (Molchat Doma Remix)
