= Miserylab =

miserylab
- Origin: Liverpool; Leeds, England
- Genres: Post-punk, alternative rock
- Years active: 1998–2012
- Labels: Carbon Neutral Digital; Shadowplay Release
- Members: Porl King

Miserylab is a music project of Porl King, formed in the late 1990s after the disbanding of Rosetta Stone in 1998.

== History ==
Miserylab was originally conceived as a moniker for remix and production purposes, such as work that King had done for My Vitriol and the Mercury Music Award-winning Elbow. The name was originally spelled "misery:lab", but King chose to remove the colon to make it easier to find in Internet search engines. The name can be seen as both a serious comment on animal experimentation and a self-deprecating comment on King and his musical output. A number of tracks were written in 2000, but were not released whilst production work remained the priority.

== Music ==
=== Early years and first releases (2005–2009) ===
Early physical releases from miserylab: Function Creep, miserylab T-shirt, A Death That We Can Cure, Freedom Is Work, Lab Samples.

In 2005, King created a profile on MySpace, reworking and uploading some of his early miserylab material. In 2007, four of these tracks were made available as a free download, complete with downloadable artwork, known as the Vaporware EP.

Encouraged by a positive response, and with the successful relocation of his home studio to Leeds, King began writing the full-length Function Creep in November 2007. Released in April 2008 as both a download and limited-edition CD, the album had a more guitar-driven, post-punk feel than did the previous EP. King had a preference for download-only releases, only making Function Creep available as a CD following requests for physical version. Function Creep was immediately followed by a downloadable extended version of the track "Be There Tomorrow."

A second album, A Death That We Can Cure, was released on 5 November 2008. (It was consciously released on the anniversary of the Gunpowder Plot). The unusual title is a Bushism. A graph on the back cover shows that many more people die of starvation than as a result of terrorism.

A third album, Freedom Is Work, was released in May 2009. Around the same time, King was approached by a Russian record label, which resulted in the release of a compilation album in Russia in August that year. Lab Samples compiled a selection of tracks from the first two albums, plus "No Cure For Life" from the Vaporware EP.

=== From Which No Light Escapes and Void of Life (2010–2011) ===
From Which No Light Escapes, the fourth album, was released in February 2011. During its creation, many of the lyrics were scrapped and replaced to better reflect the events of 2010, and the album title also changed. The track "Downplay" was made available for preview via the miserylab Facebook page. An additional three tracks from the album's recording session—"Futile", "Machines" and "Heart"—were posted two months later on the audio distribution site SoundCloud, under the name From Which No Light Out-Takes. The Terrorizer magazine supplement Dominion gave the album a positive review, comparing the sound to that of Joy Division and early Killing Joke. Glass magazine described it as eloquent and dark, with a "defined maturity in the songs." They also detected a stronger new wave influence than was present on early miserylab albums, and discussed the album's social commentary.

On 18 May 2011, miserylab's single "Appeal to Fears" was made available for preview via SoundCloud. The track includes Kathryn Woolley as a backup vocalist. It was officially released to the public via miserylab's official website on 19 May 2011.

The track "Gods Amongst Your Friends", a track that Porl had decided to not include in the fifth album, was released on 7 June 2011. The track also includes backup vocals by Woolley.

The first track, "Children of the Poor", from miserylab's fifth album was released on 21 July 2011 as a free digital download. An accompanying video was also released on YouTube. Describing a disenfranchised youth ignored by a political elite, the song preceded the 2011 England riots by a matter of weeks. The track was also used by footwear retailer Schuh in its 30th-anniversary advertising campaign, which began on 22 August 2011.

The limited-edition Void of Life album became available for order between 9 and 15 October 2011, and was manufactured and shipped by the end of the month. An extended remix of "Children of the Poor" was made available for download with all orders, and the album was preceded by a promotional video for a new track, "People".

The release exhibited higher production values than did the early albums and their original, pared-back sound. The Brutal Resonance e-zine gave the album a rating of 9/10, complimenting regimented guitar arrangements and the "unpleasant observations" within the lyrics. The publication also give high praise to the final track, "Last Day", commenting, "Not since the Cure did the song 'The Top' has a musical outing ever left me feeling so drained." Dominion ranked it as the second-best album of 2011, awarding the number-one spot instead to Esben and the Witch.

2011 ended with the release of two further tracks, "five:one one" and "Fear for the Future".

=== Somewhere Between and Documentary (2012–present) ===
In 2012, "Children of the Poor" and "People" were re-released as a seven-inch vinyl single. Limited to just 120 copies, it could be ordered in combination with a new download known as the Somewhere Between EP.

A second miserylab compilation became available in September 2012. Documentary was a combined CD and seven-inch vinyl release, held within a single gatefold sleeve. Available via the Paris-based D-monic label, it included tracks from Freedom Is Work onward. The CD includes 17 tracks, four of which are also present in vinyl form.

2012 also saw the emergence of In Death It Ends, a new music project used by King to explore occult and dark ambient sound. The first release, Forgotten Knowledge, was made on cassette tape to evoke a retro 1970s mystique. As In Death It Ends continued to maintain King's interest, miserylab went into hiatus. In Death It Ends continues to be an active project.

In May 2019, King released a number of miserylab songs as a new album titled Seems Like Forever under the name of Rosetta Stone, his previous band from the late 1980s to mid-1990s. Rosetta Stone resumed with further new material in 2020.

== Discography ==
| Title | Format | Label | Date |
|---|---|---|---|
| Vaporware EP | download EP | Carbon Neutral Digital | 2007-07 |
| Function Creep | download album / CD | Carbon Neutral Digital | 2008-04 |
| "Be There Tomorrow (Extended Version)" | download single | Carbon Neutral Digital | 2008-05 |
| "Will We Ever Learn" | download single | Carbon Neutral Digital | 2008-07 |
| "Up in Arms" | download single | Carbon Neutral Digital | 2008-10 |
| A Death That We Can Cure | download album / CD | Carbon Neutral Digital | 2008-11 |
| "Making a Bomb" | download single | Carbon Neutral Digital | 2008-12 |
| "In the Line of Fire (Extended Remix)" | download single | Carbon Neutral Digital | 2008-12 |
| Freedom Is Work | download album / CD | Carbon Neutral Digital | 2009-05 |
| Lab Samples (Compilation) | download album / CD | Shadowplay Records | 2009-08 |
| Dystopian / The Skin Thing | download EP | Carbon Neutral Digital | 2009-09 |
| From Which No Light Escapes | download album / CD | Carbon Neutral Digital | 2011-02 |
| Lab Samples (Compilation, re-release) | download album / CD | Carbon Neutral Digital | 2011-03 |
| From Which No Light Out-Takes | download EP | Carbon Neutral Digital | 2011-04-15 |
| "Appeal to Fears" | download single | Carbon Neutral Digital | 2011-05-19 |
| "Gods Amongst Your Friends" | download single | Carbon Neutral Digital | 2011-06-07 |
| "Cut : To Bits [Extended Remix]" | download single | Carbon Neutral Digital | 2011-07-07 |
| "Children of the Poor" | download single | Carbon Neutral Digital | 2011-07-21 |
| Void of Life | download album / CD | Carbon Neutral Digital | 2011-10-26 |
| "five:one one" | download single | Carbon Neutral Digital | 2011-11-04 |
| "Fear for the Future" | download single | Carbon Neutral Digital | 2011-11-19 |
| "Tomorrow for Us" | download single | Carbon Neutral Digital | 2012-06-06 |
| Documentary (Compilation) | double gatefold CD + 7" vinyl | D-Monic Records | 2012-09-15 |

=== Remixes ===
| Artist | Title | Label | Number | Date |
|---|---|---|---|---|
| Mellow | "Shinda Shima" | Atmospheriques | ATM24016 | 2001 |
| Nylon Pylon | "Sister Siam" | Booneytunes | BOONCD1 | 2001 |
| Elbow | "Coming Second" | V2 Records | VVR5018708 | 2002 |
| My Vitriol | "The Gentle Art of Choking" | Infectious Records | INFEC 107CDSX | 2002 |
| Mellow | "Take Me Higher" | Rivolizione Sessantanove Atmospheriques | B00008LOLM | 2003 |
| New Skin | "Sweettalk" | Cleopatra Records | CLP 1630-2 | 2006 |
