= Boris Ryzhy =

Russian poet (1974–2001)

- Борис Рыжий
- Born: 8 September 1974; Chelyabinsk, Russian SFSR, Soviet Union
- Died: 7 May 2001 (aged 26); Yekaterinburg, Russia
- Education: Ural State Mining University (Geology)
- Known for: Poetry, Geology
- Notable work: Opravdaniye zhizni ("A Reason to Live")

Boris Borisovich Ryzhy (Note: Also transliterated as Ryzhii or Ryzhiy) (Russian: Борис Борисович Рыжий; 8 September 1974 – 7 May 2001) was a Russian poet and geologist. Some of his poems have been translated into English, Italian, German, Dutch and Serbian. He died by suicide on 7 May 2001, at the age of 26. He was born in Chelyabinsk, but had lived in Sverdlovsk (renamed Yekaterinburg after the dissolution of the Soviet Union) since 1980.

== Family and death ==
At the time of his death, Ryzhy's reputation had burgeoned and he was starting to receive recognition as one of the premier poets of his generation. He was awarded the Anti-Booker Prize and accepted an invitation to the Rotterdam Poetry Festival. Ryzhy took his own life by hanging on 7 May 2001, at the age of 26. His suicide, seen by some skeptics as an act to gain recognition and fame (the kind of which had occurred in Russia since Sergei Esenin's suicide in a St. Petersburg hotel in 1925), may have been a consequence of his bipolar disorder and substance abuse. Shortly afterwards, he was posthumously awarded the Northern Palmyra, one of the most highly sought-after prizes in Russian poetry, for his collection Opravdaniye zhizni ("A Reason to Live"). He had at least one prior suicide attempt in 1999.

His only son, Artem (born 19 January 1993) died of a cardiac arrest in September 2020, at the age of 27.

== Legacy ==
Since his death in 2001, his poetry has been lauded and added to the canon of Russian poets. Many of his poems and collections have been added to the volumes of essential literature in the last several years, and he has gained huge popularity for his verse. His own depression and addiction to alcohol figure prominently. He was from the intelligentsia class, and had an impressive education in geology and nuclear geophysics and published many scientific papers.

Curiously, his reputation has been slow to grow outside of Russia. Following his death, a few translations have appeared in English, Italian, German, Dutch and Spanish. In 2024, several of his poems were included in Buenos Aires Poetry n°1, in Russian, English and Spanish.

Aliona van der Horst made the documentary Boris Ryzhy in 2009, and has received several awards including the Best Feature Documentary at the Edinburgh International Film Festival 2009.

Belarusian post-punk band Molchat Doma adapted the lyrics for their 2018 song Судно ("Bedpan"), from Ryzhy's poem Эмалированное судно ("Enameled Bedpan").
