= Elektroforez =

Russian musical group

Elektroforez Электрофорез
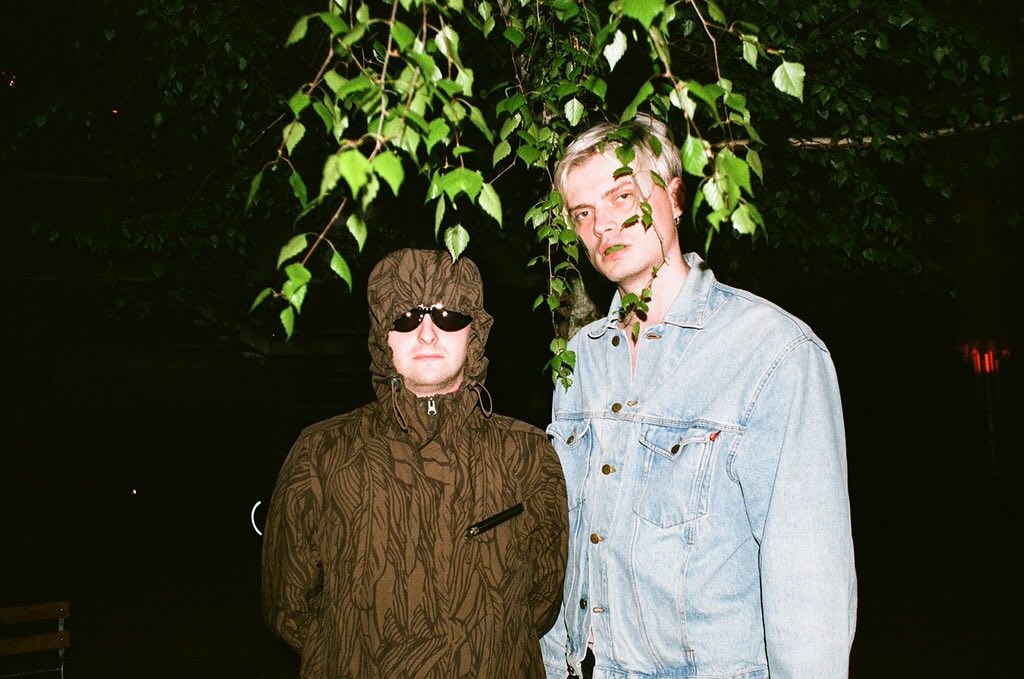

Background information
- Origin: Saint Petersburg, Russia
- Genres: Synth-pop, darkwave
- Years active: 2012–present
- Members: Ivan Kurochkin; Vitaly Talyzin

Elektroforez (Russian: Электрофорез, lit. 'Electrophoresis') is a Russian synth-pop group, founded in Saint Petersburg in 2012 by Ivan Kurochkin and Vitaly Talyzin.

== Career ==
In 2013, the American band Xiu Xiu released an official remix of the song "Eshafot" (Russian: «Эшафот», lit. 'Scaffold'). Elektroforez performed twice at the 10th edition of Manifesta, the European Biennial of Contemporary Art, held in Saint Petersburg. In 2014, Afisha named the group's album Quo Vadis? as one of the most anticipated Russian albums. In 2016, the song "Vse bylo tak" (Russian: «Всё было так», lit. 'Everything Was Thus') was used in the film Gorodskie ptichki (Russian: «Городские птички», lit. 'City Birds'), directed by Yuliya Belaya and featuring actors from the Gogol Center in the lead roles. Since 2016, the group has been actively touring, playing over 100 concerts in Russia, Belarus, the Baltic states, Germany, and Ukraine. In 2017, the group won the Golden Gargoyle music award in the Electronic Project category. In the same year, the group performed in Tallinn Music Week.

In April 2018, Elektroforez performed in Minsk, Warsaw, Poznan, Berlin, and Kaliningrad as part of a showcase of Russian bands including Kazuskoma, Spasibo, Glintshake, and Shortparis. During the tour, the group caught the attention of a number of Polish promoters. The group also performed at Stereoleto Festival.

At the end of 2018, the group released the music video for the song "Ikea" (Russian: Икея).

In 2019, Elektroforez was featured in The Quietus's series on the Russian alternative music scene.

== Discography ==
=== Studio albums ===
- 2012 — #1
- 2017 — Quo Vadis?
- 2021 — 505

=== EPs ===
- 2012 — Electroforez
- 2013 — EP #2
- 2015 — EP #3
- 2016 — EP #4
- 2018 — EP #5

=== Singles ===
- 2013 — "Moskva" (Russian: Москва, lit. 'Moscow')
- 2014 — "Vsyo bylo tak" (Russian: «Всё было так», lit. 'Everything was thus')
- 2014 — "Pora!" (Russian: Пора!, lit. 'It's time!')
- 2017 — "Russkaya printsessa" (Russian: Русская принцесса, lit. 'Russian princess')
- 2017 — "Couci-Couça"
- 2019 — "Alkogol moy vrag" (Russian: Алкоголь мой враг, lit. 'Alcohol is my enemy')
- 2019 — "Panicheskaya ataka" (Russian: Паническая атака, lit. 'Panic attack')
- 2019 — "Vezhlivyy Otkaz" (Russian: Вежливый отказ, lit. 'Polite refusal')
- 2019 — "Vsyo budet normal'no?" (Russian: Всё будет нормально?, lit. 'Everything will be alright?')

=== Remixes ===
- Shortparis — "Amsterdam" Elektroforez remix
- Svidanie — "Kate Moss" (Russian: Кейт Мосс) Elektroforez remix
- Barto — "Sama!" (Russian: Сама!, lit. 'Myself') Elektroforez remix
