= Venus (disambiguation) =

Venus is the second planet from the Sun.

Venus or VENUS commonly refers to:

- Venus (mythology), a Roman goddess

Venus or VENUS may also refer to:

== Arts and entertainment ==
=== Films ===
- Venus (1929 film), a silent French film
- Venus (1932 film), an Italian film
- Venus (2006 film), a British comedy-drama
- Venus (2017 film), a Canadian comedy-drama
- Venus (2022 film), a Spanish-language horror

=== Music ===
==== Bands ====
- Venus (Belgian band)

==== Albums ====
- Venus (Ari Brown album) (1998)
- Venus (Hello Venus EP) (2012)
- Venus (We Are the Fury album) (2007)
- Venus (Joy Williams album) (2015)
- Venus (Zara Larsson album), (2024)
- Vénus, a 2008 album by Sheryfa Luna
- Venus, a 2014 EP by Jett Rebel

==== Songs ====
- "Venus" (Frankie Avalon song), released in 1959
- "Venus" (Lady Gaga song), released in 2013
- "Venus" (Shocking Blue song), also prominently covered by Bananarama
- "Venus" (Tackey & Tsubasa song)
- "Venus", a song from the 2004 album Talkie Walkie by Air
- "Venus", a 2013 song by Azealia Banks
- "Venus", a song from the 1993 album Cyberpunk by Billy Idol
- "Venus", a song from the 2001 album Weird Revolution by Butthole Surfers
- "Venus", a song from the 2012 album Soundtrack for the Voices in My Head Vol. 02 by Celldweller
- "Venus", a song from the 1998 album Supersystem by The Feelers
- "Venus", a song from the 2011 album Eclipse by Journey
- "Venus", a 1997 single by Low
- "Venus", a song from the 2012 album The Return by Shinhwa
- "Venus", a song from the 1977 album Marquee Moon by Television
- "Venus", a song from the 1998 album Aégis by Theatre of Tragedy

==== Other music ====
- "Venus, the Bringer of Peace", a movement from Gustav Holst's orchestral suite The Planets
- Venus (opera), a 1922 opera by Othmar Schoeck

=== Literature ===
- Venus (novel), a 2000 science fiction novel by Ben Bova
- Venus series, a series of science fiction novels by Edgar Rice Burroughs
- Venus (Marvel Comics), the name of two comic book characters
  - Venus (comic book)

=== Other uses in arts and entertainment ===
- Venus (mural), by Knox Martin
- Venus (play), by Suzan-Lori Parks, 1996
- Venus Award, a German adult film award

== Businesses ==
- Venus Centre, a dubbing company in Syria
- Venus Fashion, a fashion retailer
- Venus Optics, a manufacturer of photographic lenses
- Venus Pencils, a pencil brand
- Venus Records, a Japanese jazz record label
- Venus Records & Tapes, an Indian record label
- Venus Zine, a quarterly US magazine

== People and fictional characters ==
- Venus (given name), including a list of people and fictional characters with the name
- Venus (surname), a list of people

== Places ==
=== United States ===
- Venus, Florida, an unincorporated community
- Venus, Missouri, an unincorporated community
- Venus, Nebraska, an unincorporated community
- Venus, Pennsylvania, an unincorporated community
- Venus, Texas, a town
- Venus, West Virginia, an unincorporated community

=== Elsewhere ===
- Venus, Chennai, India, a neighborhood
- Venus, Romania, a summer resort
- Venus Bay, South Australia, Australia
- Venus Bay, Victoria, Australia
- Venus Bay (New Zealand)
- Venus Glacier, Alexander Island, Antarctica
- Point Venus, Tahiti, a peninsula

== Science and technology ==
- Venus (bivalve), a genus of clams
- VENUS (Victoria Experimental Network Under the Sea), an oceanographic observatory in British Columbia, Canada
- VENμS, a joint satellite mission between the Israeli Space Agency and the CNES
- Venus, a yellow fluorescent protein derivative
- Gillette Venus, a razor
- LG Venus, a mobile phone
- Microsoft Venus, an aborted set-top operating system
- Walter Venus, a 1920s aircraft engine
- Venus Automobile, a 1950s American custom car
- Venus Engine, an image processing system for cameras

== Ships ==
- Venus (ship), several ships
- French ship Vénus, several French ships and vessels
- HMS Venus, several ships of the Royal Navy
- MV Venus, several merchant ships
- SS Venus, several steamships
- Swedish frigate Venus (1783)
- TSS Princess Maud (1934), later renamed Venus
- USS Venus (AK-135), a US Navy cargo ship
- Venus (yacht), a yacht built for Steve Jobs

== Other uses ==
- Venus (astrology), a planet in astrology
- Venus (cat), a cat with unusual markings
- Venus (typeface)
- FC Venus București, a Romanian football team
  - Stadionul Venus, a stadium in Bucharest

== See also ==
- Venus de Milo (disambiguation)
- Venus figurine, Paleolithic carvings
- Venus Flytrap (disambiguation)
- Venus Project (disambiguation)
- Venus Wars, 1980s anime film
- Venous, pertaining to veins
