= Lumous Gothic Festival =

Goth festival in Tampere, Finland (2001–2020)

- Genre: gothic rock, deathrock, industrial, EBM, neofolk
- Locations: Tampere, Finland
- Years active: 2001 – 2020
- Website: Lumous Gothic Festival

Lumous Gothic Festival (more commonly known as Lumous) was the largest festival dedicated to the goth subculture in Finland and the northernmost Gothic festival in the world. The four-day event was organised every summer in Tampere in late June or early July. While its primary focus was on music, covering musical genres such as gothic rock, deathrock, industrial, EBM and neofolk, other cultural and arts events were also organised as part of the festival. Lumous Festival consisted mainly of club nights organised in bars and clubs at the centre of Tampere, and also included a cruise dubbed die dunkle Seereise on the lake Pyhäjärvi.

Lumous was organised yearly by Lumous Gothic Ry, and its history dates back to 2001 when a handful of Tampere club nights decided to join forces and organise a three-day event called Extreme Gothic Weekend with performances from Two Witches, Nik, The Candles Burning Blue and Viola. Since then, the name of the event was changed in 2002 to the current Lumous Gothic Festival, the festival gained popularity within Finland and beyond, and also expanded to a four-day event. Previous years have seen international acts such as Zombina and the Skeletones, Das Ich, Haujobb, Pro-jekt and Killing Miranda play at Lumous, along with local bands such as Two Witches, Masquerade, Virgin in Veil and Suruaika.

== Program by year ==
=== 2001 Lumous Gothic Festival I ===
Originally known as Extreme Gothic Weekend

Bands

- Two Witches (FI)
- The Candles Burning Blue (FI)
- Viola (FI)
- Niklas Carlsson of Dark Side Cowboys (SE)

=== 2002 Lumous Gothic Festival II ===
Bands

- Ordo Rosarius Equilibrio (SE)
- No Festival Of Neither Light Order Roses Nor Equilibrium (SE)
- Tabloid (SE)
- Suruaika (FI)
- The Candles Burning Blue (FI)
- A.Z.O.I.C. (FI)
- J. Witch & M. Hautamäki Acoustic (FI)

Special guest DJ
Frey (FI)

=== 2003 Lumous Gothic Festival III ===
Bands

- Sepulcrum Mentis (DE)
- Varjo (FI)
- Imaginary Walls (SE)
- Martin Kasprzak & Marko Hautamäki (DE/FI)
- The Cyan Velvet Project (FI)
- UltraNoir (FI)
- Nyx (FI)
- Gravehill (FI)

=== 2004 Lumous Gothic Festival IV ===
Bands

- Killing Miranda (UK)
- Coph Nia (SE)
- Haujobb (DE)
- VJ Fetish 23 (SE)
- Suruaika (FI)
- Machine Park (FI)
- Scarecrow (FI)

=== 2005 Lumous Gothic Festival V ===
Bands

- Angels & Agony (NL)
- Midnight Configuration (UK)
- Two Witches (FI)
- The Protagonist (SE)
- Pro-jekt (UK)
- Neon Zoo (UK)
- Angelica Kult (FI)
- Mesmer (FI)
- The Mimic (FI)

=== 2006 Lumous Gothic Festival VI ===
Bands

- Zombina & The Skeletones (UK)
- Inertia (UK)
- Raison d'Etre (SE)
- Libitina (UK)
- Doppelgänger (RU)
- Suruaika (FI)
- Silene (FI)
- UltraNoir (FI)
- Nevernettles (FI)

=== 2007 Lumous Gothic Festival VII ===
Bands

- Das Ich (DE)
- All Gone Dead (UK)
- Venus Fly Trap (UK)
- KnifeLadder (UK)
- Suicidal Romance (EE)
- Suruaika (FI)
- SinMasters (FI)
- Machine Park (FI)
- 80th Disorder (FI)
- Varjopiiri (FI)

Special guest DJ
Trevize (FI)
Lecture
Sofi Oksanen (FI)

=== 2008 Lumous Gothic Festival VIII ===
Bands

- Psyche (CA/DE)
- Kirlian Camera (IT)
- Star Industry (BE)
- The Last Days of Jesus (SK)
- Desiderii Marginis (SE)
- Voices of Masada (UK)
- Forgotten Sunrise (EE)
- Novus (UK)
- Beati Mortui (FI)
- Curtain Call (FI)

Documentary
Vuoden Synkin Juhla (about Finnish Goth scene)

=== 2009 Lumous Gothic Festival IX ===
Bands

- Project Pitchfork (DE)
- Inkubus Sukkubus (UK)
- Vendemmian (UK)
- Deviant UK (UK)
- Patenbrigade:Wolff (DE)
- Golden Apes (DE)
- Trümmerfrau (DE)
- Grunt (FI)
- Silene (FI)
- Murnau's Playhouse (FI)
- Silent Scream (FI)
- The Mimic (FI)
- -Sihil (FI)

Lecturer
Timo Vuorensola (FI)

=== 2010 Lumous Gothic Festival X ===
Bands

- Leæther Strip (DK)
- XP8 (IT)
- Nosferatu (UK)
- Two Witches (FI/DE)
- Deutsch Nepal (SE)
- The Cemetary Girlz (FR)
- Waves Under Water (SE)
- Grooving In Green (UK)
- Silene (FI)
- Chaos Research (FI)
- Kuroshio (FI)
- Haeretici 7074 (FI)
- Maria (FI)

Documentary
Vuoden Synkin Juhla (about Finnish Goth scene)

=== 2011 Lumous Gothic Festival XI ===
Bands

- Klutæ (DK)
- Star Industry (BE)
- Anne-Marie Hurst Skeletal Family (UK)
- Attrition (UK)
- Freakangel (EE)
- Larva (ES)
- Lloyd James & Edel Braun (UK)
- Silent Scream (FI)
- UltraNoir (FI)
- Wreckdance (FI)
- -Sihil (FI)
- Loistava Polku (FI)
- Impakt! (FI)
- Depressed Blokes (FI)
- Single Sound (FI)

Special guest DJ
[M4RC] (NL)

=== 2012 Lumous Gothic Festival XII ===
Bands

- Extinction Front (ES)
- Soviet Soviet (IT)
- The Last Days of Jesus (SK)
- Chaos All Stars (SE)
- Bloodygrave & Die Lust! (DE)
- Emplosia (RU)
- Jemek Jemowit (DE)
- Psyyke (FI)
- Oldschool Union (FI)
- Impakt! (FI)
- Harmony Garden (FI)
- Whrmcht (FI)

Special guest DJ
Meke (FI)

=== 2013 Lumous Gothic Festival XIII ===
Bands

- Spiritual Front (IT)
- Cryo (SE)
- Dark Side Cowboys (SE)
- Darkrad (RU)
- Silent Scream (FI) - acoustic special
- Erila-Z (FI)
- Ovro (FI)
- Loistava Polku (FI)
- Masquerade (FI)
- Wreckdance (FI)
- Protectorate (FI)

Special guest DJ
K-109 (FI)

=== 2014 Lumous Gothic Festival XIV ===
Bands

- Leæther Strip (DK)
- Ordo Rosarius Equilibrio (SE)
- Two Witches (FI/DE)
- Malaise (SE)
- Autogen (LV)
- Psyyke (FI)
- Chaos Research (FI)
- Blastromen (FI)
- Unzyme (FI)
- The Flatfield (FI)
- Juha Raution Duo Perikato (FI)
- J.K.Ihalainen (FI)

Special guest DJs
Nik Carlsson (SE), Kari Berg (SE)
Special storytellers
Antti Lautala (FI), Matthew Pallasoja (FI)

=== 2015 Lumous Gothic Festival XV ===
Bands

- Das Ich (DE)
- Red Sun Revival (UK)
- Los Carniceros Del Norte (ES)
- Golden Apes (DE)
- Sleetgrout feat. Zynthexia (RU)
- Forgotten Sunrise (EE)
- Afghan Dance (DE/FI)
- Silene (FI)
- Wreckdance(FI)
- Harmony Garden (FI)
- The Flatfield (FI)
- Bodykomplex (FI)

Special storytellers
J. Witch, M. Hautamäki, Toby (FI)
Special guest DJs
Jaakko (FI), 4-Got-10 (EE)
Lecture
Trestalkers (FI)
Documentary
Industrial Soundtrack For the Urban Decay

=== 2016 Lumous Gothic Festival XVI ===
Bands

- Aesthetic Perfection (US)
- SHIV-R (AU)
- Two Witches (FI)
- Canis Lupus (SE)
- Naevus - Solo (UK)
- Blastromen (FI)
- Chaos Research (FI)
- Masquerade (FI)
- Unzyme (FI)
- Cardinal Noire (FI)
- Virgin In Veil (FI)
- Sortaja (FI)
- Submission (FI)

Special guest DJs
Shades (FI), Slackerbitch (SE)
Special storytellers
Advanced Art (FI)

=== 2017 Lumous Gothic Festival XVII ===
Bands

- Nachtmahr (AT)
- Spiritual Front (IT)
- Double Echo (UK)
- Thinner (LV)
- Severance (MX)
- Giant Waves (RU)
- Nemuer (CZ)
- The Flatfield (FI)
- Many Happy Returns (FI)
- Hexdrive (FI)
- Bodykomplex (FI)
- Miseria Ultima (FI)
- Aus Tears (FI)

Special guest DJ
Shades (FI)

=== 2018 Lumous Gothic Festival XVIII ===
Bands

- Terrolokaust (ES)
- Metallspürhunde (CH)
- Randolph's Grin (US/AT)
- The Doctors (FR)
- Auger (UK)
- Novus (UK)
- Agnosia (FI)
- Astral Zombie (FI)
- Chaos Research (FI)
- Hateful Chains (FI)
- Riot Kitten (FI)
- Sekret Teknik (FI)

Special guest DJs
Niklas Carsson (SE), Jussi40 (FI)
Poetry performance
Artemis Kelosaari (FI)
Lecturer
Eero Ojanen (FI)

=== 2019 Lumous Gothic Festival XIX ===
Bands

- Das Ich (DE)
- The Danse Society (UK)
- Inertia (UK)
- Golden Apes (DE)
- Black Volition (UK)
- Blood Magick (SE)
- My Own Burial (ES)
- Raven Said (RU)
- Tyburn Blossom (IE)
- Aeronaut V (FI)
- Murnau's Playhouse (FI)
- Plastic Bitch (FI)
- UltraNoir (FI)
- Virgin In Veil (FI)

Special guest DJ
NightOwl (SE)
Lecturer
Asko Alanen (FI)

=== 2020 Lumous Gothic Festival XX – The Final Episode ===
Bands

- Two Witches (FI)
- Oldschool Union (FI)
- Chaos Research (FI)
- Sekret Teknik (FI)

== See also ==
- List of gothic festivals
- List of industrial music festivals
- List of electronic music festivals
