= María Enriqueta =

Mexican bolero singer (1922–1996)

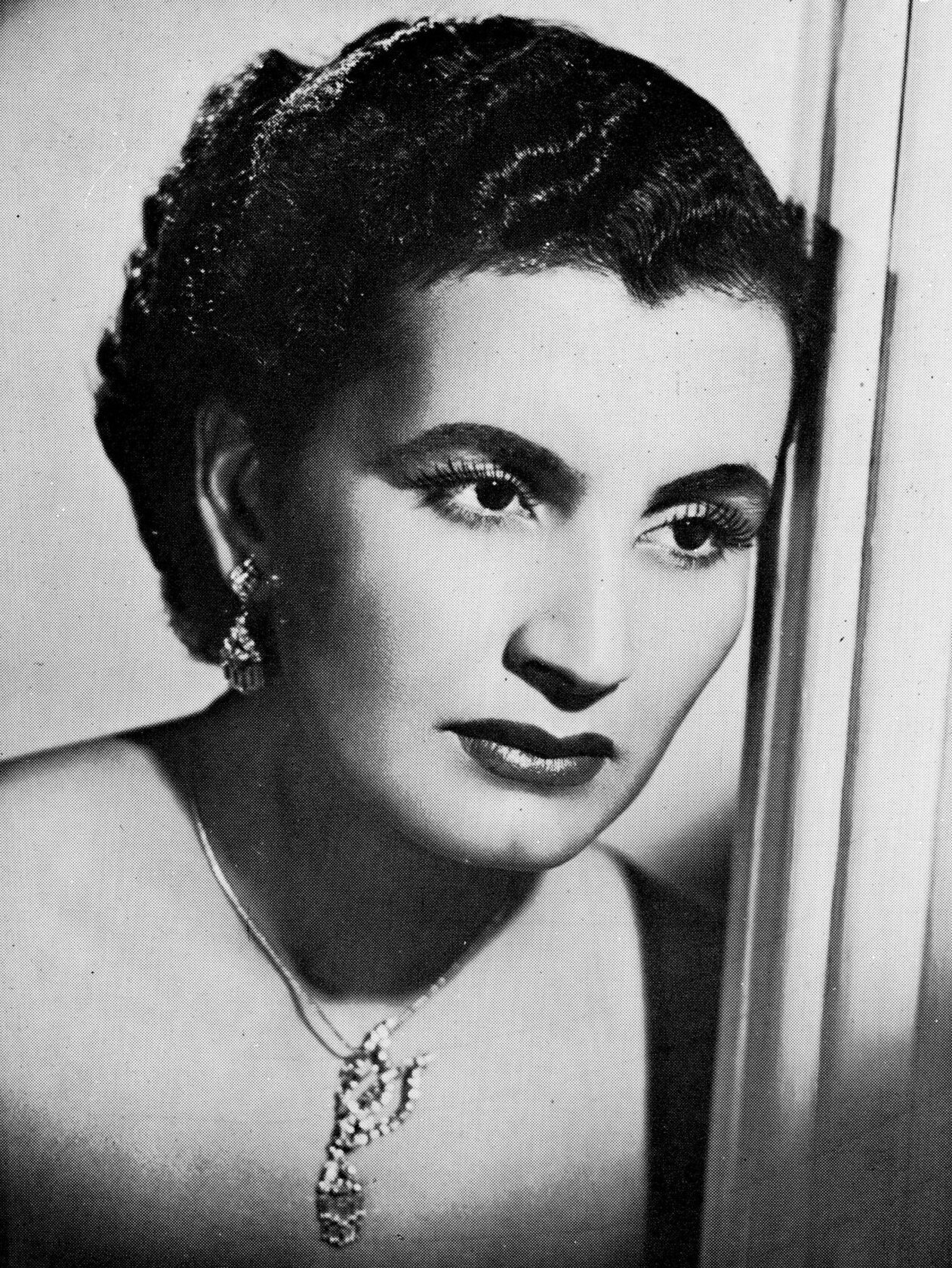
- María Enriqueta in 1954

Background information
- Born: Enriqueta García Escoto c. 1922; Tampico, Tamaulipas, Mexico
- Died: 16 January 1996 (aged 74) Mexico City, Mexico
- Genre: Bolero
- Occupation: Singer
- Instrument: Vocals
- Labels: RCA Victor; Musart

Enriqueta García Escoto (c. 1922 – 16 January 1996), known as María Enriqueta, was a Mexican bolero singer. Her dark complexion and great physical beauty earned her the nickname "La Venus Morena" (The Swarthy Venus [de Milo]).

She was born c. 1922 in Tampico, Tamaulipas, Mexico. Her father, Estanislao García Espinoza, was a founding director of the marching band of the Mexican Navy. Her mother's name was Ángela Escoto.

She was most famous in the 1950s when she achieved popularity as a radio performer and was one of RCA Victor Records' best-selling Mexican artists. She also recorded for Musart Records.

The noted orchestra conductor Eleazar Martínez was the father of her daughter, Cecilia Martínez García. María Enriqueta lived in Coyoacán with her husband, Roberto Monter Carpio. She died of pneumonia at the age of 74 on 16 January 1996 in Tlalpan, Mexico City. Her remains were cremated at the Panteón Español in Mexico City.
