= Venus Flytrap (disambiguation) =

The Venus flytrap (Dionaea muscipula) is a carnivorous plant.

Venus Flytrap or Venus Fly Trap may also refer to:

== Music ==
- Venus Fly Trap (band), a British alternative rock group
- Venus Flytrap (group), a Thai pop music group
- "Venus Fly Trap" (song), a 2021 song by Welsh singer-songwriter Marina
- "Venus Flytrap", a 2011 song by Philippine rock duo Turbo Goth
- “venus fly trap”, a song by singer-songwriter Brakence

== Other uses ==
- Venus Flytrap (film) (aka Akuma no Niwa (The Devil's Garden) and The Revenge of Doctor X), a 1970 American/Japanese horror film
- Venus Flytrap (WKRP in Cincinnati), a character on the television situation comedy WKRP in Cincinnati
- Venus flytrap sea anemone, a large sea anemone resembling a Venus flytrap
- Venus the Flytrap, a 1990 video game for Amiga and Atari ST

== See also ==
- Venus (disambiguation)
- Venus McFlytrap, a character from Monster High
- Venus Firetrap, a character in the Super Mario video game series
- "Venus Fly", a song by Grimes from her 2015 album Art Angels
