= Venus Genetrix =

Venus Genetrix may refer to:

- Venus Genetrix, epithet of the goddess Venus
- Venus Genetrix (sculpture), the name for a type of sculptural depiction of the goddess
- Temple of Venus Genetrix, a ruined temple in the Forum of Caesar, Rome

== See also ==
- Genetrix (disambiguation)
- Venus (disambiguation)
