= Venus and Anchises =

Venus and Anchises may refer to:

Mythology

- Parents of Aeneas
- Venus and Anchises, a story in Ovid's Metamorphoses

Art

- Venus and Anchises, a work in the painting series The Loves of the Gods (Carracci) by Annibale Carracci
- Venus and Anchise (Richmond), painting by William Blake Richmond
- Venus and Anchise (Fletcher), or Britain's Ida, or Venus and Anchises, 1628 poetry attributed to Phineas Fletcher
- Venus and Anchise (Haydon), painting by Benjamin Robert Haydon
- Venus and Anchises, accompanied by Cupid, painting by Wallerant Vaillant
- Anchises and Venus 1822 work by Jean-Baptiste Paulin Guérin
- Venus and Anchise (Piranesi), drawing by Giovanni Battista Piranesi
- Venus, Anchises and Cupid, painting by Thomas Rowlandson

== See also ==
- Venus (disambiguation)
- Anchises
