= Castel Sainte-Claire =

Villa in Var, France

Coordinates: 43.1211°N 6.1250°E

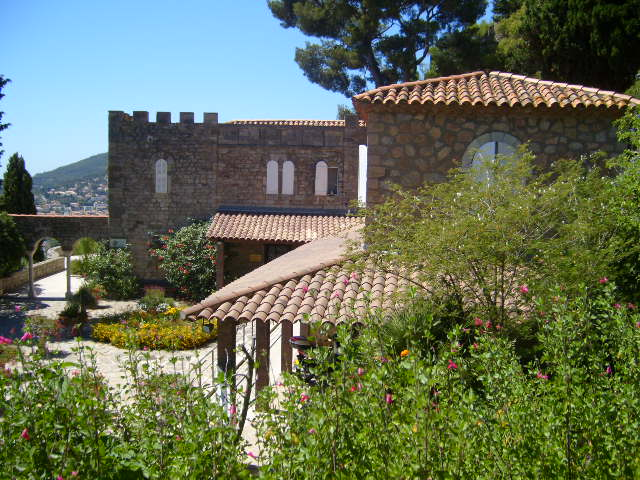
The Castel Sainte-Claire

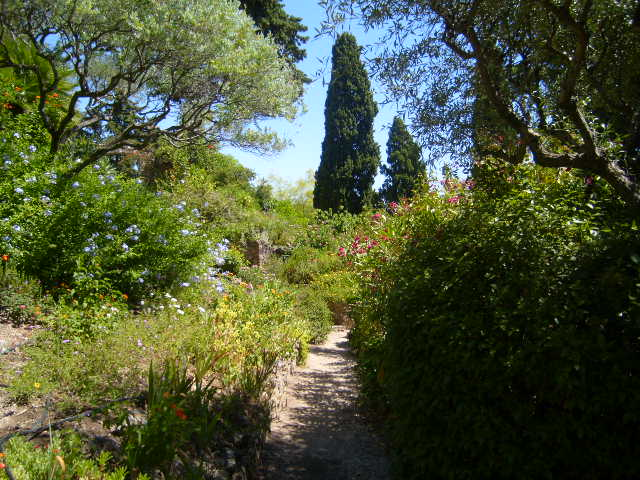
The Garden of the Castel Sainte-Claire

The Castel Sainte-Claire (French pronunciation: [kastɛl sɛ̃tklɛʁ]) is a villa in the hills above Hyères, in the Var department of France, which was the residence of Olivier Voutier, a French officer who brought the Venus de Milo to France in 1820, and later of the American novelist Edith Wharton. Its garden is classified as one of the Remarkable Gardens of France.

== History ==
The Castel Sainte-Claire is located in the hills just above the old town of Hyères. Its park contains the ruins of part of the old walls of the city, dating to the end of the 12th century. The walls were destroyed by the order of Cardinal Richelieu during the reign of Louis XIII.

In the 17th century, the site was occupied by a convent belonging to the order of the Institute of Poor Women, created in Assisi in 1212, of which Sainte-Claire was the first Mother Superior. Following the French Revolution, the convent was closed, the convent was demolished, and the land was sold.

In 1820, the land was sold to the French naval officer and archeologist Olivier Voutier, best known as the man who brought the Venus de Milo from Greece to France. Voutier constructed the present villa, which he called La Villa Sainte Claire, and restored the ramparts of the old city between the villa and the ruins of an old tower. Voutier's grave is located in the park, next to the ruined tower.

In 1927, the property was purchased by the American novelist Edith Wharton, who used it as her summer residence. She called it "Sainte-Claire du Château" and created the garden in its present form, filling it with cacti and sub-tropical plants.

The villa was purchased by the city of Hyères in 1955, and the park became a public garden. Since 1990 it has been the office of the National Park of Port-Cros and the Botanical Preserve of Porquerolles (the island park off the coast of Hyères).
