= Olivier Voutier =

French naval officer (1796–1877)

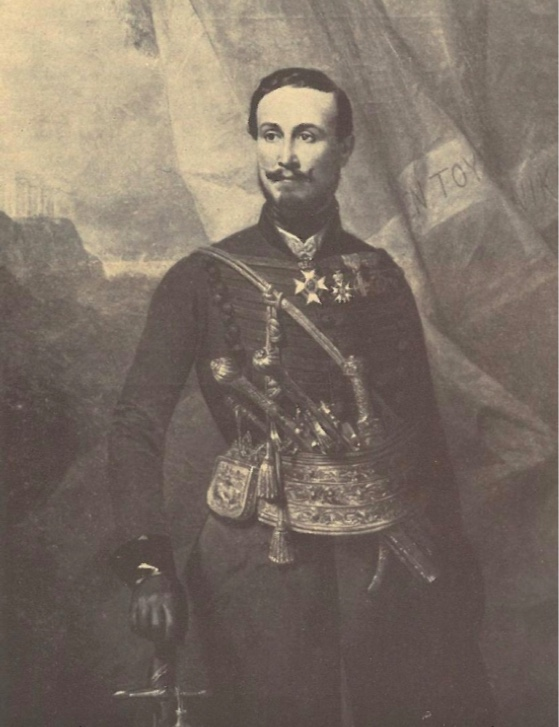
- Born: 30 May 1796; Thouars, France
- Died: 18 April 1877 (aged 80); Hyères, France
- Military career
- no: 1820–1847
- Rank: Colonel
- Conflicts: Greek War of Independence

Olivier Voutier (30 May 1796 – 18 April 1877) was a French naval officer who discovered the statue of the Venus de Milo in 1820, and fought in the Greek War of Independence.

== Discovery of the Venus de Milo ==
Voutier was the son of a naval officer, and at the age of fifteen entered the Naval School in Brest. In April 1820, at the age of twenty-three he was an ensign on the French naval schooner Estafette stopping at the island in Milos in the Aegean. He was interested in the history of ancient Greece, and decided to see if he could find any objects of interest. He took two sailors with shovels and picks, and began digging in the ruins of an ancient theater located on the side of the island's highest hill. Voutier and the sailors found marble fragments, a bust, a carved foot, and two statues missing their heads, hands and feet.

While Voutier was searching, he witnessed a Greek farmer discover part of a sculpture. Voutier encouraged the farmer to continue digging, and he eventually unearthed the marble sculpture of the Venus, in two large parts, alongside a few other sculptural fragments. Contrary to some accounts, the statue did not have its arms when it was discovered, as shown in drawings that Voutier made of the statue at the time.

The farmer, whose name was Yorgos Ketrotas, was interested in selling the statue. Over the next ten days, Voutrier brought Louis Brest, the French vice-consul on Milos, to see what he had found, along with a number of sailors and naval officers. One was a naval officer named Jules Dumont d'Urville. D'Urville, a classicist, recognized the identity of the statue and the importance of the discovery. However, the Captain of the Chevrette would not take the statue onto the ship. D'Urville wrote to the French Ambassador in Constantinople, the Marquis de Riviere, then went in person and persuaded him to buy the statue for France, which he did. A ship was sent to take the statue back to Toulon, and in 1821, the statue was presented to King Louis XVIII, who in turn donated it to the Louvre.

== Greek War of Independence ==
In 1821, Voutier resigned from the Navy and joined the Greek insurgents in the Greek War of Independence, under the command of Demetrios Ypsilantis. He took part in the siege of Tripolizza, where he arrived in September 1821, in the company of a British supporter of Greek independence, Thomas Gordon. In March 1822 the Minister of War of the provisional government of Greece, Ioannis Kolettis, gave Voutier the assignment of laying siege to the center of Athens without damaging its monuments. He was later named a colonel in the Greek Army.

He retired to the city of Hyères in 1847, where he purchased the land of a former convent in the hills and constructed a villa called the Castel Sainte-Claire. He is buried in the park of the villa.

== Bibliography ==
- Curtis, Gregory, Disarmed - The Story of the Venus de Milo. Vintage, 2004.
- Colonel Voutier, Découverte et acquisition de la Vénus de Milo, Hyères, 1874, in-8° br.
- Jean-Paul Alaux, La Vénus de Milo et Olivier Voutier, Collection du galion d’or chez Jean-Paul Alaux, Paris, 1939.
- Jules Sébastien César Dumont d'Urville, Marie-Louis-Augustin Demartin du Tyrac et Olivier Voutier, L’Enlèvement de Vénus, La Bibliothèque, 1994 (ISBN 2909688062).
- Takis Thédoropoulos : L'invention de la Vénus de Milo Sabine Wespieser Editeur, ISBN 978-2-84805-064-5
