= Venus de Milo (disambiguation) =

Venus de Milo is an ancient Greek marble statue of a semi-nude Aphrodite.

Venus de Milo may also refer to:

== Music ==
- "Venus de Milo", a song by D.I. (band)
- "Venus De Milo", a song by Bob Manning (pop singer)
- "Venus de Milo", a jazz standard by Gerry Mulligan covered by Miles Davis in 1949
- "Venus de Milo", a song by Michael Nyman from And Do They Do/Zoo Caprices
- "Venus de Milo", a song by Prince from Parade (Prince album)

== Other ==
- Venus (Teenage Mutant Ninja Turtles), a fictional character
- Frances O'Connor (performer), sideshow performer billed as the "living Venus de Milo"

== See also ==
- Venus de Miles, women's annual bicycle event
- X-Statix, Marvel Comics superhero team including Venus Dee Milo
