= Parian marble =

Type of marble stone from Greece

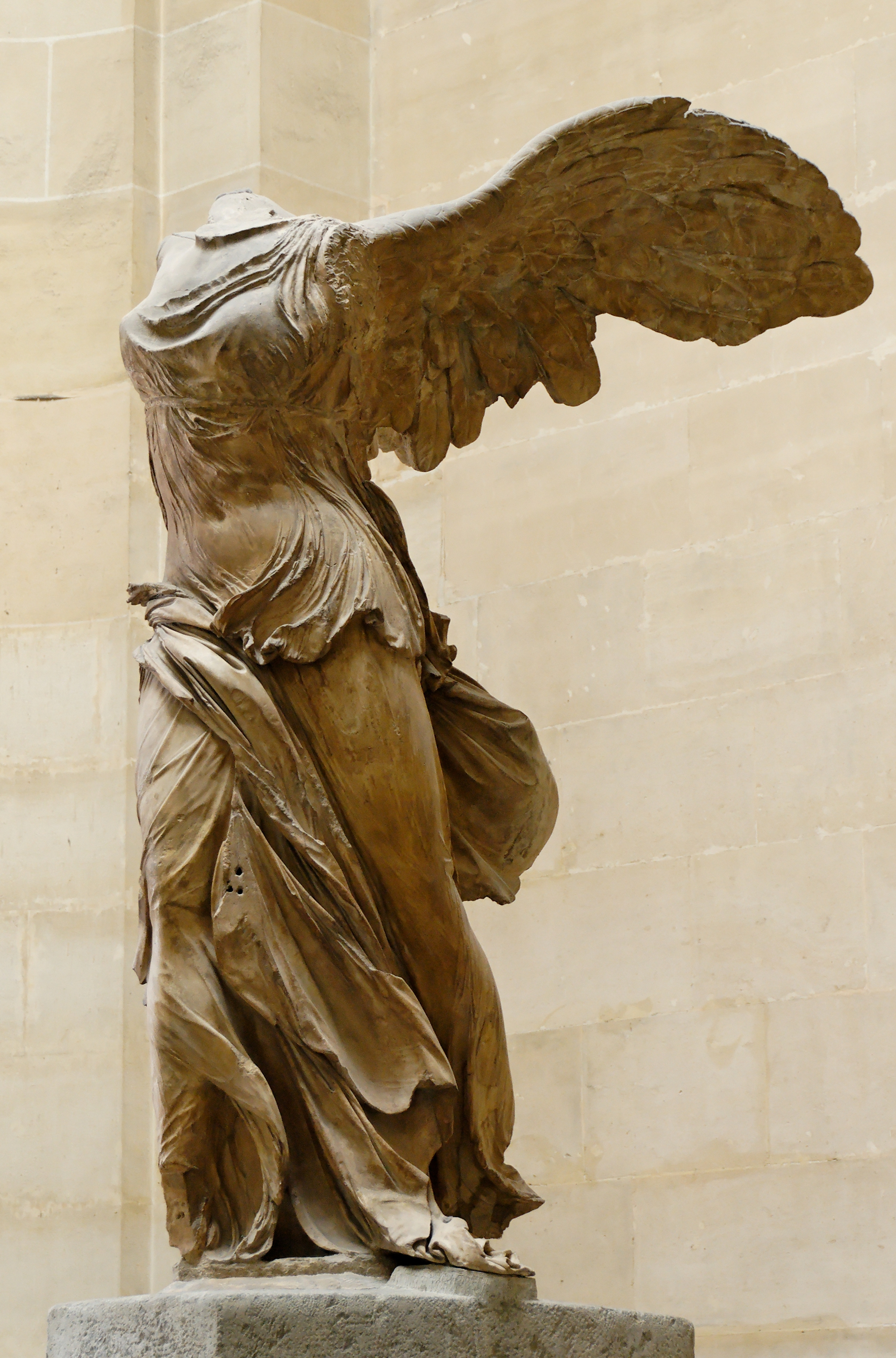
The Nike of Samothrace is made of Parian marble (c. 220–190 BC)

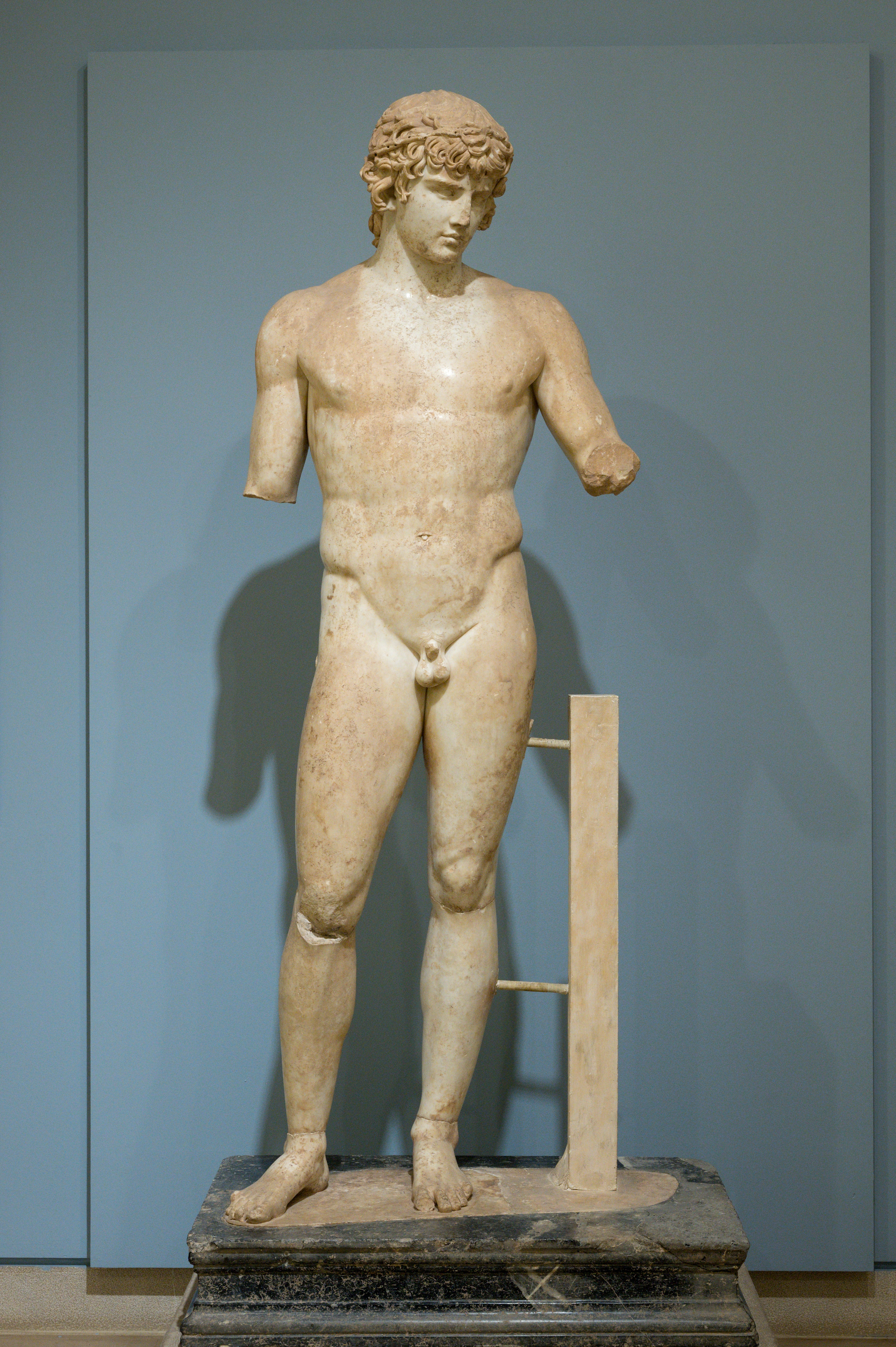
Statue of Antinous (Delphi), polychrome Parian marble, made during the reign of Hadrian (r. 117–138 AD)

Parian marble is a fine-grained, semi translucent, and pure-white marble quarried during the classical era on the Greek island of Paros in the Aegean Sea. A subtype, referred to as Parian lychnites, was particularly notable in antiquity by ancient Greeks as a material for making sculptures.

Some of the greatest masterpieces of ancient Greek sculpture were carved from Parian marble, including the Medici Venus, the Venus de Milo, and the Winged Victory of Samothrace.

Archeological fieldwork on Paros has identified extensive ancient marble open-pit quarries, with the most significant sites being found at Chorodaki, Marathi, and Agios Minas. In addition to these open-pit quarries, shaft quarries were also used to mine Parian marble. There were two notable shafts in the valley of Agios Minas, identified as the "Grotto of the Nymphs" and the "Grotto of Pan" because of the relief carvings located near the entrances to the shafts, and the size of these two shafts led to a mistaken assumption by some scholars, influenced by the writing of Raniero Gnoli in his book Marmora romana, that Parian marble could only be obtained in small blocks (roughly c. 1 m³).

The Parian's main rival in antiquity was Pentelic marble, which is also flawless white, albeit with a uniform, faint yellow tint that makes it shine with a golden hue under sunlight. It is today mined mostly on the neighbour island of Paros, Naxos, in the mountains near the village of Kinidaros.

Parian ware is an artificial substitute for marble, originally a brand name for a variety of unglazed biscuit porcelain, developed in 1842 in England. This is cast in moulds, typically for small busts and figurines, rather than carved.

== Notable uses ==
- Venus de Milo
- Peplos Kore
- Lycian sarcophagus of Sidon
- Statue of Augustus from Prima Porta
- Hermes and the Infant Dionysus
- Parthenon's roof tiles
- Poseidon of Melos
