= Poseidon of Melos =

Ancient Greek statue

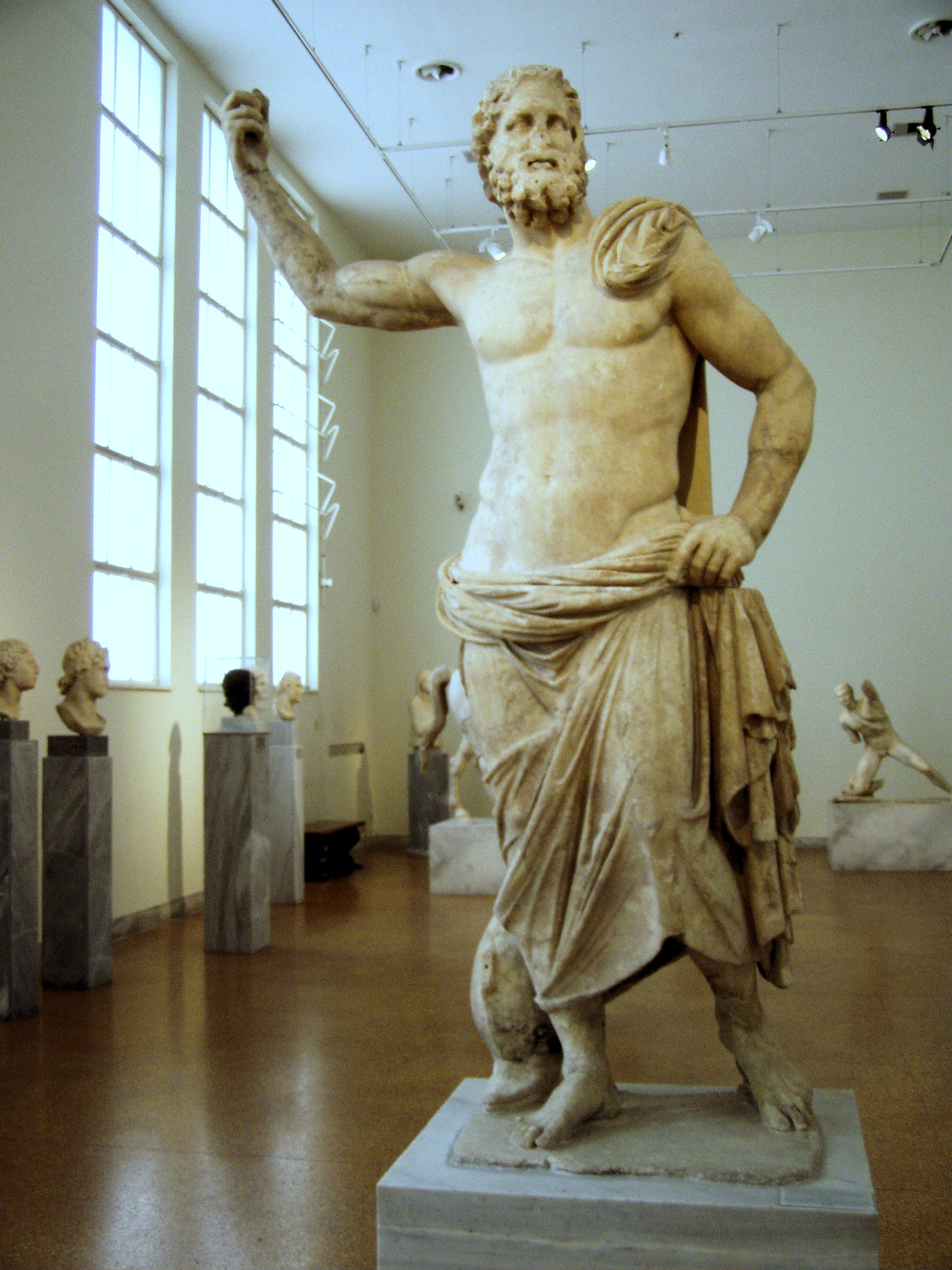
Frontal view of the statue in its current location in room 30 of NAMA ( in the background)

The Poseidon of Melos (Ancient Greek: Ποσειδῶν τῆς Μήλου) is a statue of Poseidon in the National Archaeological Museum, Athens (NAMA), with an inventory number 235, which is dated to the last quarter of the second century BC, thus to the Hellenistic Period.

The statue was found in 1877 on the island of Melos, where the famous Venus de Milo was also found, in 1820. It is made of Parian marble and has a height of 2.35 metres, which makes it more than lifesize. The statue was found in several pieces, which have been reattached to one another. Portions of the left foot and of the himation are modern recreations. Parts of the nose, beard and hair are missing.

The sea god is depicted naked to the waist in an awe-inspiring pose, with his muscular right arm raised, probably in order to hold a trident (now lost). His himation hangs around his hips, covering his legs and genitals; he holds it in place at his side with his left hand. His back is also partially covered; a bit of cloth lies, mysteriously suspended, on his left shoulder. His weight rests on his right leg, his left leg is left free. The musculature of his arms and his body generally are very finely worked. The head is slightly tilted to the left and his gaze is directed into the distance. There is a dolphin behind the statue to the right, which serves as additional support for the weight of the statue. The pose is a standard one for Poseidon, Zeus, and Hades.

== Bibliography ==
- Kaltsas, Nikolaos (2002). Τα γλυπτά. Εθνικό Αρχαιολογικό Μουσείο, κατάλογος [Sculpture in the National Archaeological Museum, Athens]. Los Angeles: The J. Paul Getty Museum. p. 290. ISBN 0-89236-686-9.
