= Genetrix =

Genetrix may refer to:

- Genetrix, novel by Francois Mauriac
- Project Genetrix
- the biotechnology company Genetrix, acquired by Genzyme in 1996 and now a part of Sanofi through its acquisition of Genzyme

== See also ==
- Venus Genetrix (disambiguation)
