= Alexandros of Antioch =

Hellenistic sculptor of the Venus de Milo

Venus de Milo
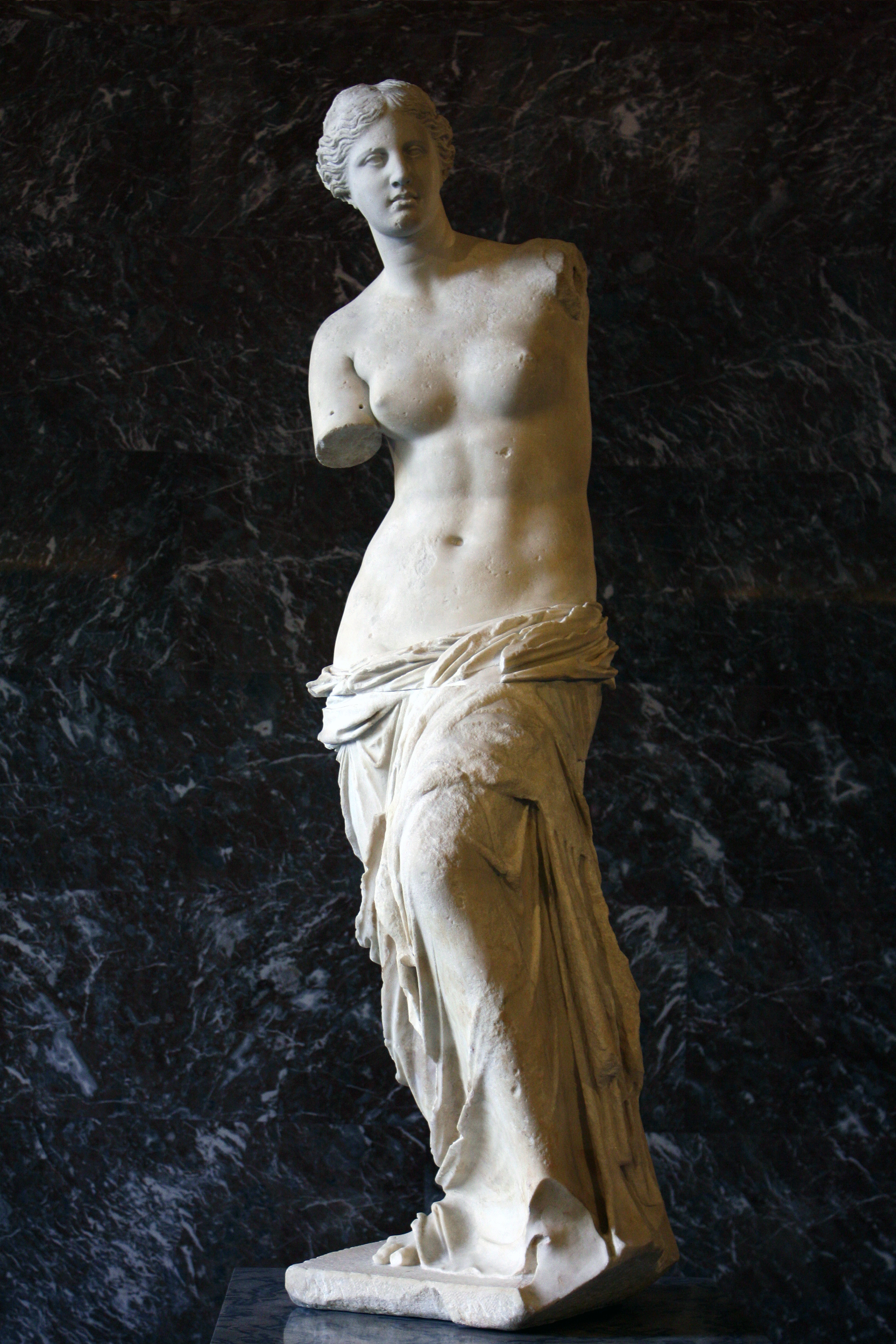
- Artist: Alexandros of Antioch
- Year: Between 130 and 100 BC
- Type: Marble
- Location: Louvre Museum; Paris, France

Alexandros of Antioch (Greek: Ἀλέξανδρος) (2nd – 1st century BC) was a Greek sculptor of the Hellenistic age. He is thought to be the sculptor of the famous Venus de Milo statue.

== Life ==
Alexandros appears to have been a wandering artist who worked on commission. According to inscriptions at the ancient city of Thespiae near Mount Helicon in Greece, he was a winner in contests for composing and singing. The inscriptions date to around 80 BCE. His father's name was Menides according to all the inscriptions. Alexandros is thought to have sculpted a statue of Alexander the Great that is also displayed at the Louvre. This statue was discovered on the Greek island of Melos. His dates of birth and death are unknown.

Alexandros is best known today for the Venus de Milo (Aphrodite of Milos) at the Louvre Museum in Paris, France. The attribution is based on an inscription from a now-missing plinth that was a part of the statue but was removed and "lost" due to museum politics and national pride at the Louvre in the 1820s. The inscription and the style of its lettering cast into doubt the claim that the statue was an original by the master sculptor Praxiteles from Attica.
