= Paul Jamot =

French painter, art critic and museum curator (1863–1939)

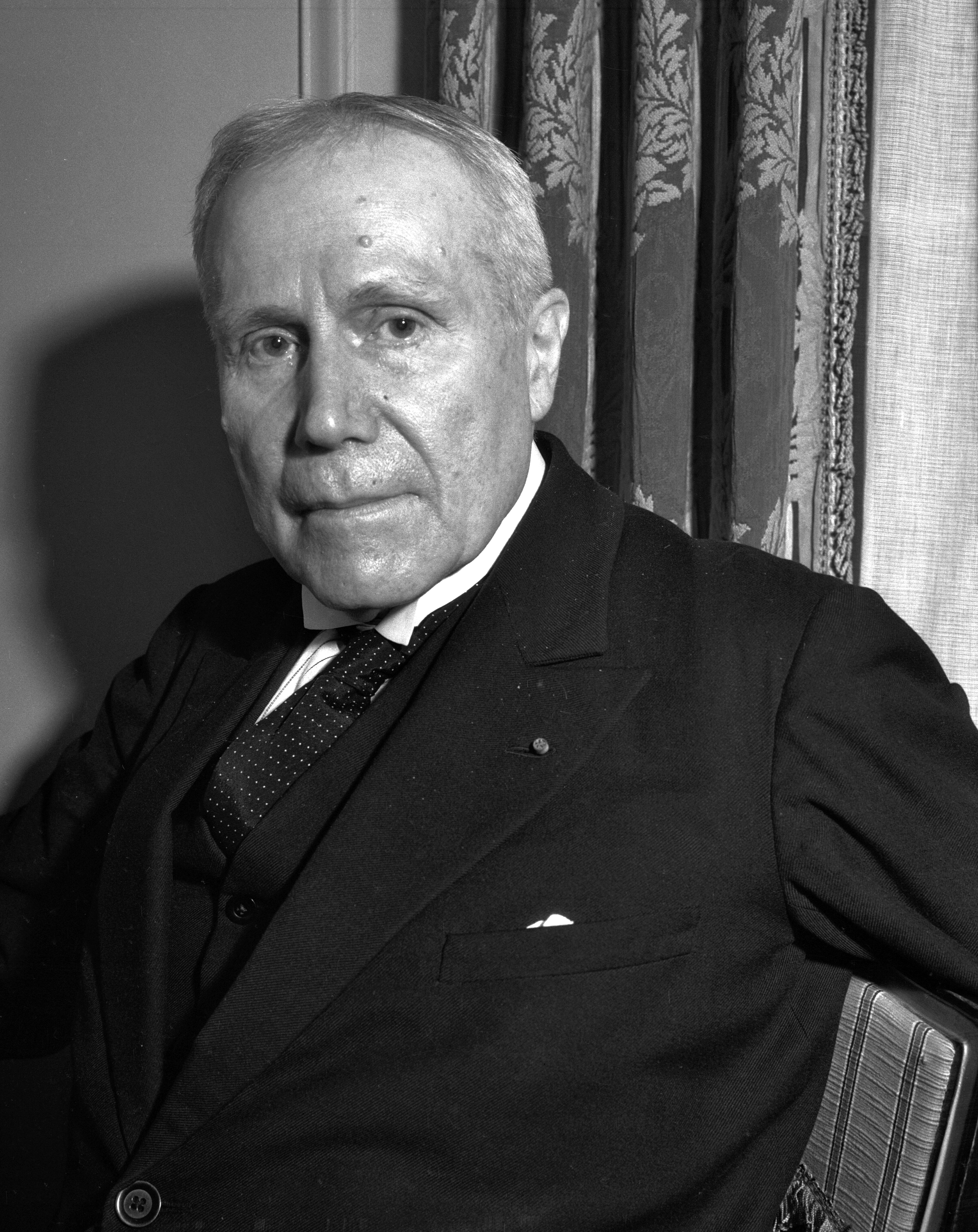
- Jamot in 1934
- Born: 22 December 1863; Paris
- Died: 13 December 1939 (aged 75); Villerville (Calvados)
- Occupations: Painter; Art critic Curator
- Spouse: Madeleine Dauphin-Dornès

Paul Jamot (English: /ʒæˈmoʊ/ zha-MOH, French: [pɔl ʒamo]; 22 December 1863 – 13 December 1939) was a French painter, art critic and museum curator.

== Biography ==
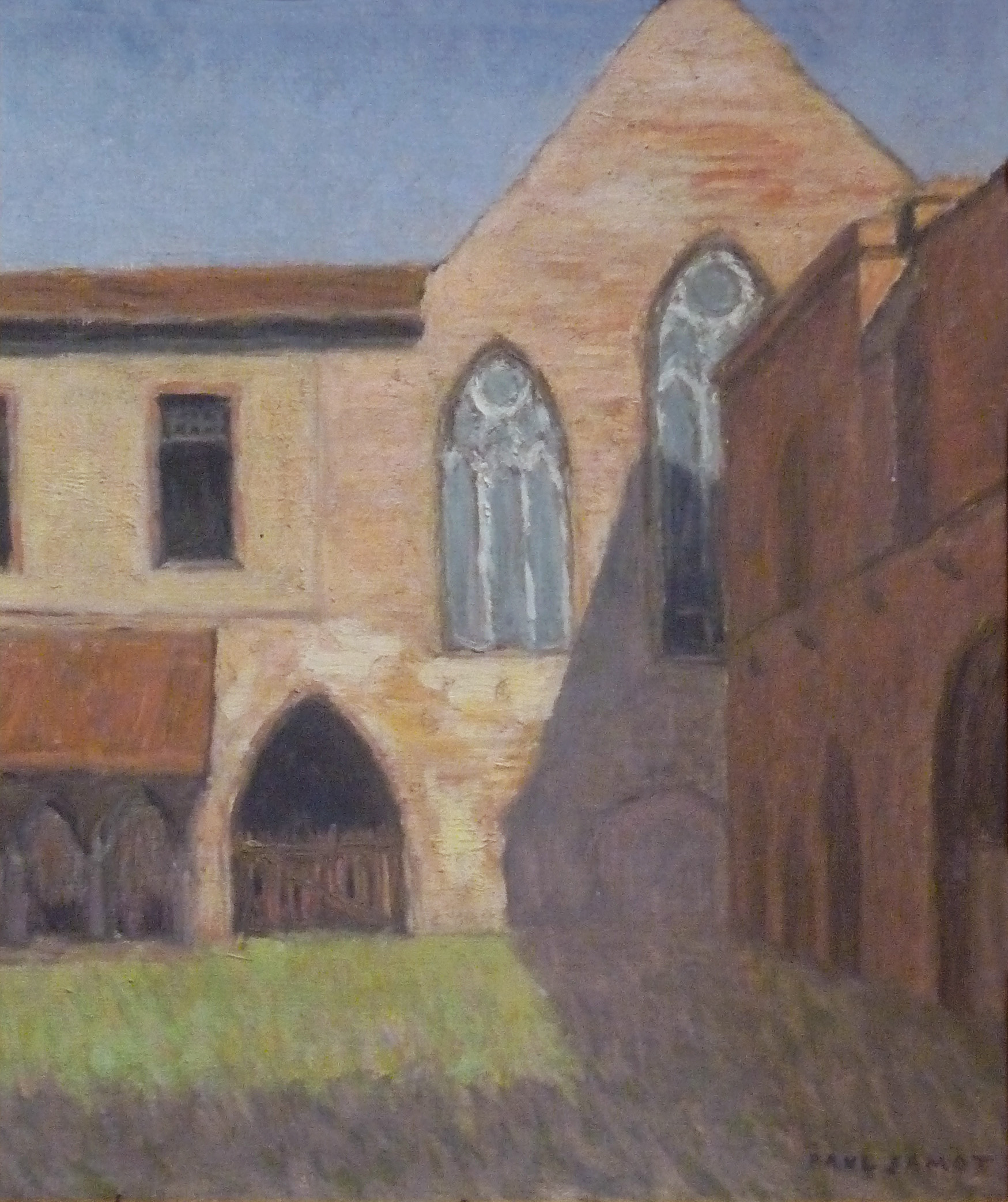
Cloître des Jacobins à Toulouse

An École normale supérieure alumni, Paul Jamot was a member of the French School at Athens (1887). He explored Argos and the valley of the Spercheios. He led the excavations in the valley of the Muses in Thespies between 1888 and 1891. He collected many inscriptions including that of the so-called stele of Hesiod. He published a travelogue: En Grèce avec Charalambos Eugénidis.

He became curator of national museums, a member of the Institute of France, commandeur of the Legion of Honour, honorary curator of the Louvre, Reims museum director from 1927 to 1939.

He bequeathed to the city a rich collection of paintings, represented by Corot, Carpeaux, Courbet, Delacroix, Maurice Denis, Forain, Ingres, Picasso, Renoir, etc. and of valuable objects, as well as to the musée du Louvre, the musée du Luxembourg and the Carnavalet Museum. A room of the musée d’Orsay was given his name.

In September 1913, Jamot organized the hall of the new musée des beaux-arts de Reims and, in 1938, the artistic part of the inauguration festivities of Notre Dame and the exhibition "Treasures of Reims" at the Orangery of the Palais des Tuileries and at the fine arts museum of Reims. Paul Jamot imposed only one condition to the City of Reims, ending his will with this sentence: Finally I leave the Reims Museum the jewelry that I had made for my wife by René Lalique; I request that they be placed in the room where the paintings bequeathed by me will be grouped, as close as possible and if possible, below the portrait of my wife by Ernest Lawrence. This wish was not fulfilled.

He is buried in Paris, at Montparnasse Cemetery, under the monument he had erected by architect Auguste Perret and Maurice Denis, for his wife Madeleine Dauphin-Dornès in 1913. Albert Besnard make a pastel portrait of the latter.

Paul Jamot also wrote several collections of poetry: Préludes (1912), Des voix dans la nuit (1918), Sacrifice du soir (1929).

Ernest Laurent painted a portrait of M. et Mme Paul Jamot, as well as a Portrait de Madame Paul Jamot, née Madeleine Dauphin-Dornès (1864-1913). Both paintings are kept at the Musée d'Orsay.

In 1922, sculptor Paul Paulin made a bust of Paul Jamot, also in the Musée d'Orsay.

== Sources ==
- This article contains text from a document on the La vie rémoise site.
