= Venus de Miles =

American all-women's bike ride

Venus de Miles is an all-women's bike ride in Colorado and Illinois. The event is organized by and benefits Greenhouse Scholars, a nonprofit organization that provides scholarship, mentorship, leadership training, and more to high-performing, under-resourced students in college.

== Description ==
Venus de Miles is a non-competitive ride that started in 2008 with 650 riders and grew to over 2,000 riders in 2011. The Colorado course starts and ends in Prospect New Town, Longmont, Colorado, and the routes range in distance from 30 to 100 miles long. The Illinois course is new in 2012 and will start and end in Lake Forest. The festival following the ride includes gourmet lunch, spa services, a cocktail lounge, and live music. Top sponsors are Trek and WhiteWave Foods. 100% of net income from Venus de Miles benefit the students of Greenhouse Scholars, and the event raises funds to provide scholarships and other support services to approximately 16 students each year.

== Recognition ==
Competitor Magazine named Venus de Miles the Best Cycling Event in Colorado in 2009, and several renowned athletes ride in the event each year, including Alison Dunlap, Susie Wargin, Connie Carpenter-Phinney, Tricia Downing, and Colleen Cannon.

== Venus Bike Club (formerly Venus de Miles Bike Club) ==
Full Cycle, the oldest bike shop in Boulder, Colorado USA, started the Venus de Miles Bike Club in 2009 as a way to introduce women to cycling, help them train for the Venus de Miles ride, have fun, and benefit Greenhouse Scholars. The Venus Bike Club now has over 200 members and 1,000+ followers. This recreational, non-competitive, no-drop, women's cycling club is about sisterhood—supporting members' emotional and physical growth into strong, beautiful women.
