= SS Venus =

A number of steamships have been named Venus, including

- SS Venus (1920), a Danish cargo ship in service 1921–41
- SS Venus (1931), a Norwegian ocean liner in service 1931–39 and 1948–68
- SS Venus (1951), a Bulgarian cargo ship in service during 1977
