= MV Venus =

MV Venus may refer to a number of ships.

- MV Venus, launched in 1939 as Empire Jonquil
- MV Venus, the summer name of the MV Black Prince between 1970 and 1985
- MV Venus, a Philippine ferry that sank in 1984.
- MV S Venus a ship hijacked by pirates in January, 2009
