= Venus Project =

Venus Project can mean:

- The Venus Project, which advocates a model for a future society by Jacque Fresco
- Pioneer Venus project, a NASA mission to the planet Venus
- VENUS project - "Virtual and E-mobility for Networking Universities in Society" project, a project of the European Commission Directorate-General for Education and Culture
- "Venus Project", a song by the death metal band Elysium's album Feedback
- "Venus Project", a song by the thrash metal band Vektor's album Outer Isolation
- Venus Project (franchise), a Japanese media franchise
