= UltraNoir =

Finnish synthpop/gothic rock/post-punk band

UltraNoir is a Finnish synthpop / gothic rock / post-punk trio founded in 2004.

Starting as a pop group, UltraNoir is influenced by shoegaze and post-rock as well as early eighties post-punk acts such as Joy Division, The Cure along with the Sisters Of Mercy and Bauhaus. These elements blended with political (anarchist) lyrics. UltraNoir's themes considered bleak visions of fascism, globalisation, social classes, sexism and existential complications of western moral codes over dreamy melody streams and laconic vocals.

Their first single "Reach Me, Helen Keller" (2006) reached chart position No. 4 in Finland.

After former guitarist Jan left the group to form Heroin and Your Veins, the remaining members Anton, Utu and Jesi continued to tour without a guitarist. Eventually Jesi too parted ways with the band leaving Anton and Utu to perform as a duo and reducing the sounds to a bleak wall of nihilism. In 2009 Niki Vaan from Cherry Stained and Nokia Missio joined their ranks, first as a tour guitarist and then as a recognized member of the band.

In early 2011, Janne Perttula rejoined UltraNoir, leading the group working on its second album UltraNoia that was released in September 2013.

There were plenty of line-up changes after the album UltraNoia.

In 2025 Ultranoir activated again with two new members; Jesperi Vaan (The Switchblades, Nokia Missio, ex-Royal Cocks) on the guitar and programming together with Spike ”Gravey Davey” Larkin (The Switchblades, Likaiset Pikkarit, ex-Refugees) taking care of the machinery.

== Discography ==
- UltraNoir/Romantic Vision 7" split "Godspeed For Good" / "Worldwide Panic" (2004)
- Compilation New Dark Age vol.3 (Strobelight, 2005)
- CDs Reach Me, Helen Keller (Quiet Life, 2006)
- Album Suffer No Fiction (Quiet Life, 2006)
- Compilation Independent Rock (Bianca-Pop, 2007)
- Compilation Smoke and spotlight vol. 5 (Inside Agitator, 2011)
- Album Ultranoia (2013)

== Members ==
=== Current ===
- Anton Vaan (vox, prog)
- Jesperi Vaan (guitar, prog) 2025 —
- Gravey Davey Spike (machinery) 2025 —

=== Previous ===
- Niki Vaan (guitar)
- Janne Perttula (guitar, prog.)
- Utu Vaan (synth)
- Jesi Vaan (bass, synth)
- Jerry Lemmiwinks (guitar, prog)
- Antse (synth)
- Miia (synth)
