= Charles François de Riffardeau, marquis de Rivière =

French diplomat (1763–1828)

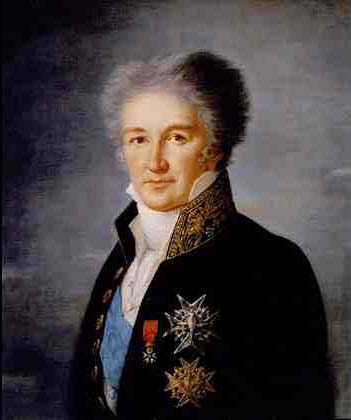
Charles de Riffardeau, by Vigée-Lebrun

Charles François de Riffardeau, marquis, then duc de Rivière (Ferté-sur-Cher, 17 December 1763 – 1828) was a French diplomat who served as the ambassador to the Sublime Porte of the Ottoman Empire from 1815 to 1821, for which service he was made duc in 1825. He played a role in getting the Venus de Milo for the Musée du Louvre.

Rivière joined the Guards at the age of seventeen. He fled at the opening of the French Revolution with the first wave of émigrés headed by Louis XVI's brother, the comte d'Artois, later Charles X, whom he followed as aide de camp to London with "a degree of superabundant loyal zeal". The comte d'Artois entrusted him with several missions to Brittany and the Vendée. In the time of Napoleon he returned to France with Charles Pichegru in 1804 and was implicated in the conspiracy against the Emperor's life headed by Georges Cadoudal; though Rivière was sentenced to death, his sentence was commuted to life imprisonment, and he was interned at Fort de Joux. He was not released until the Bourbon Restoration, when Louis XVIII made him a Peer of France and appointed him ambassador to the Ottoman court. On his return to France he was made Captain of the Guards to Charles X, was made a duke in 1825, and became tutor to the duc de Bordeaux in March 1826.

The series of lithographed Vues de Londres (Paris, 1862) were executed by his son, also Charles François de Riffardeau, duc de Rivière.

The Mémoires posthumes, lettres et pièces authentiques touchant la vie et la moirt de Charles François, duc de Rivière, edited by Joseph Jacques, vicomte de Naylies, was published in Paris, 1829.
