= French ship Vénus =

Many ships of the French Navy have borne the name Vénus in honour of the Roman goddess of love Venus:

- French frigate Vénus (1706), a 16-gun frigate
- French frigate Vénus (1723), a 26-gun frigate
- French frigate Vénus (1780), a 32-gun frigate, lead ship of her class.
- French frigate Vénus (1782), a Hébé-class frigate
- French corvette Vénus (1794), a 26-gun corvette
- French corvette Vénus (1795), a captured 20-gun Dutch corvette
- French galley Vénus (1797), a captured Venetian galley
- French fluyt Vénus (1799), a fluyt
- French frigate Vénus (1806), a Junon-class frigate
- French corvette Vénus (1810), a captured 20-gun Dutch corvette
- French frigate Vénus (1823), a 52-gun frigate, lead ship of her class.
- French frigate Vénus (1865), a steam frigate, lead ship of her class.
- French ship Vénus (1914), an armed cargo ship
- French ship Vénus (1918), an armed cargo ship
- French submarine Vénus (1935), a Minerve-class submarine
- French submarine Vénus (S649) (1966), a Daphné-class submarine

also:

- French auxiliary patrol vessel Vénus (1898), a trawler requisitioned 1914-1919 and 1940-1940
- French auxiliary patrol vessel Vénus (1906), a fishing vessel requisitioned 1918-1919
- French auxiliary patrol vessel Vénus I, a trawler requisitioned 1914-1919 and, as Vénus II (AD76), 1939-1940
- French auxiliary patrol vessel Vénus II, a trawler requisitioned 1914-1916
- French auxiliary patrol vessel Vénus III, a trawler requisitioned 1915-1919

== Sources and references ==
- Roche, Jean-Michel (2005). Dictionnaire des bâtiments de la Flotte de guerre française de Colbert à nos jours. Vol. 1. Group Retozel-Maury Millau. ISBN 978-2-9525917-0-6. OCLC 165892922.
- Roche, Jean-Michel (2013). Dictionnaire des bâtiments de la Flotte de guerre française de Colbert à nos jours. Vol. 2. Group Retozel-Maury Millau. ISBN 978-2-9525917-3-7. OCLC 165892922.
- NetMarine
