= Venus Automobile =

The Venus Automobile is a one-piece fiberglass-bodied custom car produced in the early to mid-1950s in the United states. The prototype was mounted on a 1949 Ford chassis and powered by a Ford flathead V8 motor with high-performance heads and intake manifold. The car's designer, Kenneth McLoad, received a US Design Patent, number 177,499 in April 1956. The Venus also appeared on the cover of the May 1953 issue of Motor Trend Magazine. Fewer than 10 of these car bodies were made, and only 2 are currently known to exist, both in Texas.
