= Forgotten Sunrise =

Estonian musical group

- Origin: Tallinn, Estonia
- Genres: Industrial, experimental
- Years active: 1992–present
- Members: Anders Melts; Kadri Sammel; Jaan Pullerits
- Past members: Gerty Villo; Pavel Torpan; Ragnar Kivi; Ott Evestus; Margus "George" Aro; Andrus Valtenberg; Jan Talts; Keijo Koppel; Margus "Kusti" Gustavson; Meelis Looveer; Renno Süvaoja; Riivo Torstenberg; Tiiu Kiik; Tarvo Valm; Andrey Voinov
- Website: www.forgottensunrise.com

Forgotten Sunrise is an Estonian industrial band founded in Tallinn, the capital of Estonia. Their sound has been described as "outdustrial" or "deathbeat" and compared to a mixture of Dead Can Dance, David Lynch, Katatonia, Celtic Frost and Clock DVA.

== History ==
=== 1992–1994 ===
Forgotten Sunrise was formed in summer 1992 as the result of common interest of Anders Melts and Jan Talts to make death metal in Estonia. Two friends with previous experiences, Margus Gustavson and Tarvo Valm, joined the yet unnamed band. After six months and having their first songs, in 1993 a demo “Behind The Abysmal Sky” was recorded. A few months later, a contract with a Finnish label, Rising Realm Records, was signed and by the end of the year the “Forever Sleeping Greystones” mini-CD had been recorded. The mini-album was released at the end of 1994. The band attracted a great deal of attention and played concerts until differences caused the drummer and the guitarist to leave the band.

=== 1996–1999 ===
With Meelis Looveer, Renno Süvaoja and Tiiu Kiik joining the group, computers were now a part of the process of making the music. In the meantime the band's style had progressed and in 1996, Forgotten Sunrise basically started again from the beginning. A period of studies and experimenting followed until Forgotten Sunrise was again ready for the stage.

In 1997, they appeared with a new sound. Though old atmospheric death metal was mixed with trip hop, techno, folk and drum'n'bass merged with shoegaze and indie-pop, the dreary grim atmosphere and severe message were still intact. With the style the group itself called Deathbeat, the first promotional CD was out in 1999 and a self-released mini-album “a.Nimal f.Lesh" in 2000.

=== 2003–2008 ===
Forgotten Sunrise signed a two album contract with the Italian label, My Kingdom Music. The first album, Ru:mipu:dus, was released in January 2004 and before that a full-length single “Ple:se Disco-Nnect Me” was given out. The album received positive reviews. In 2005, the track “Never(k)now” was given out as a promotional single.

The second album, Willand, was recorded in fall 2005 and was released in spring 2007.

In 2006, Gerty Villo joined the band with keyboards and female vocals. In 2007, Pavel Torpan joined with guitars and Different Knots of Ropelove, a 12 track remix CD (including remixes by Alec Empire, Pehr Herb, Darkmen etc.), was released.

=== 2009 ===
A full-length CD-single, "The Moments When God Was Wrong", was self-released and the demo tape "Behind The Abysmal Sky" with a mini-CD "Forever Sleeping Greystones" with 7 live bonus tracks was re-released on CD.

=== 2010 ===
Ragnar Kivi joined the band with electronic drums.

=== 2012-2014 ===
Celebrating 20 years of the band, the compilation "Time Flies" was released, containing previously unheard remixes, demos and rare tracks. In 2013, the third full-length album "Cretinism" was released by the legendary German record label Out Of Line. As 20 years also passed since the first demo release, Forgotten Sunrise's first line-up came back together for one night to play live in Hard Rock Laager.

In 2014, Forgotten Sunrise continued briefly as the solo project of founder Anders Melts. The 7" double-single with Horricane was released, with "Tule Eest" contributed by Forgotten Sunrise and "Deportation" by Horricane on the other side. In the same year, Kadri Sammel joined the band, sharing production and vocal duties.

=== 2015-2019 ===
As a duo, the band released the singles "Sepapoisid", "Guardian Curtains" and "Dusturn" in the following years. In 2019, the Hungarian label Old Skull Productions reissued Forgotten Sunrise's first demo cassette "Behind The Abysmal Sky".

=== 2020-present day ===
In 2020, Jaan "Suva" Pullerits joined the band, completing the line-up in its current three-piece form.

As Forgotten Sunrise reached the 30 year milestone in 2022, a compilation titled "Dirty Years Of Sunraisk" with further rare and unreleased material was released.

The year 2023 was especially eventful, as 30 years passed since the first demo release. This, as well as the first EP that followed, were re-released in two different colour 12" editions. The first line-up also reunited once again to play the old material at Käbliku Beer Camp & Rock'N'Roll festival. Just one month after that, Forgotten Sunrise released their fourth full-length album after ten years, titled "elu". It's marked to be the middle chapter in the upcoming trilogy "Hall elu jah!".

"elu" was re-released in 2CD format in 2025. It contained the original tracks as well as 21 remixes by artists such as G.G.F.H., Statiqbloom, ESA and Nigh/T\mare among many others.

== Members ==
=== Present members ===
- Anders "Kuratino" Melts - vocals, bass, percussions, programming (from 1992)
- Kadri Sammel - keyboards, vocals, bass, programming, visuals (from 2014)
- Jaan "Suva" Pullerits - controlling the arrangements of chaos (from 2020)

=== Former members ===
- Gerty Villo – keyboards, female vocals (2006-2014)
- Pavel Torpan – guitars (2007-2013)
- Ragnar Kivi - electronic drums (2010-2014)
- Andrey Voinov – bass guitar (1999–2001, 2004–2007)
- Ott Evestus – drums (2003–2005)
- Margus "George" Aro – keyboards (1993–1995)
- Andrus Valtenberg – electronic instruments (2005–2006)
- Jan Talts – bass guitar (1992–1999)
- Keijo Koppel – guitar (1997–1999)
- Margus "Kusti" Gustavson – guitar (1992–1995)
- Meelis Looveer – programming (1996–2001)
- Renno Süvaoja – guitar (1996–2006)
- Riivo Torstenberg – bass guitar (2001–2004)
- Tarvo Valm – drums (1992–1995)
- Tiiu Kiik – female vocals, keyboards (1997–2005)

== Discography ==
=== Albums ===
- Ru:mipu:dus (2004)
- Willand (2007)
- Cretinism (2013)
- elu (2023)
- elu + dELUx reMIXes (2025)

=== EPs / mini-albums ===
- Behind The Abysmal Sky (1993) demo
- Forever Sleeping Greystones (1994)
- Forgotten Sunrise (1999)
- a.Nimal f.Lesh – Looma Liha (2000)
- Behind The Abysmal Sky (2019) re-release

=== Singles ===
- Ple:se Disco-Nnect Me (2003)
- Never(k)now (2005)
- Different Knots of Ropelove (2007)
- The Moments When God Was Wrong (2009)
- Tule Eest / Deportation (with Horricane, 2014)
- Sepapoisid (2015)
- Guardian Curtains (2016)
- Dusturn (2017)

=== Compilations ===
- Behind The Abysmal Sky / Forever Sleeping Greystones (2009) re-release
- Time Flies - Rare and Unreleased 1992-2012 (2012)
- Dirty Years Of Sunraisk (2022)
- Behind The Abysmal Sky / Forever Sleeping Greystones (2023) 12" re-release
