= Masquerade (Finnish band) =

Finnish post-punk band

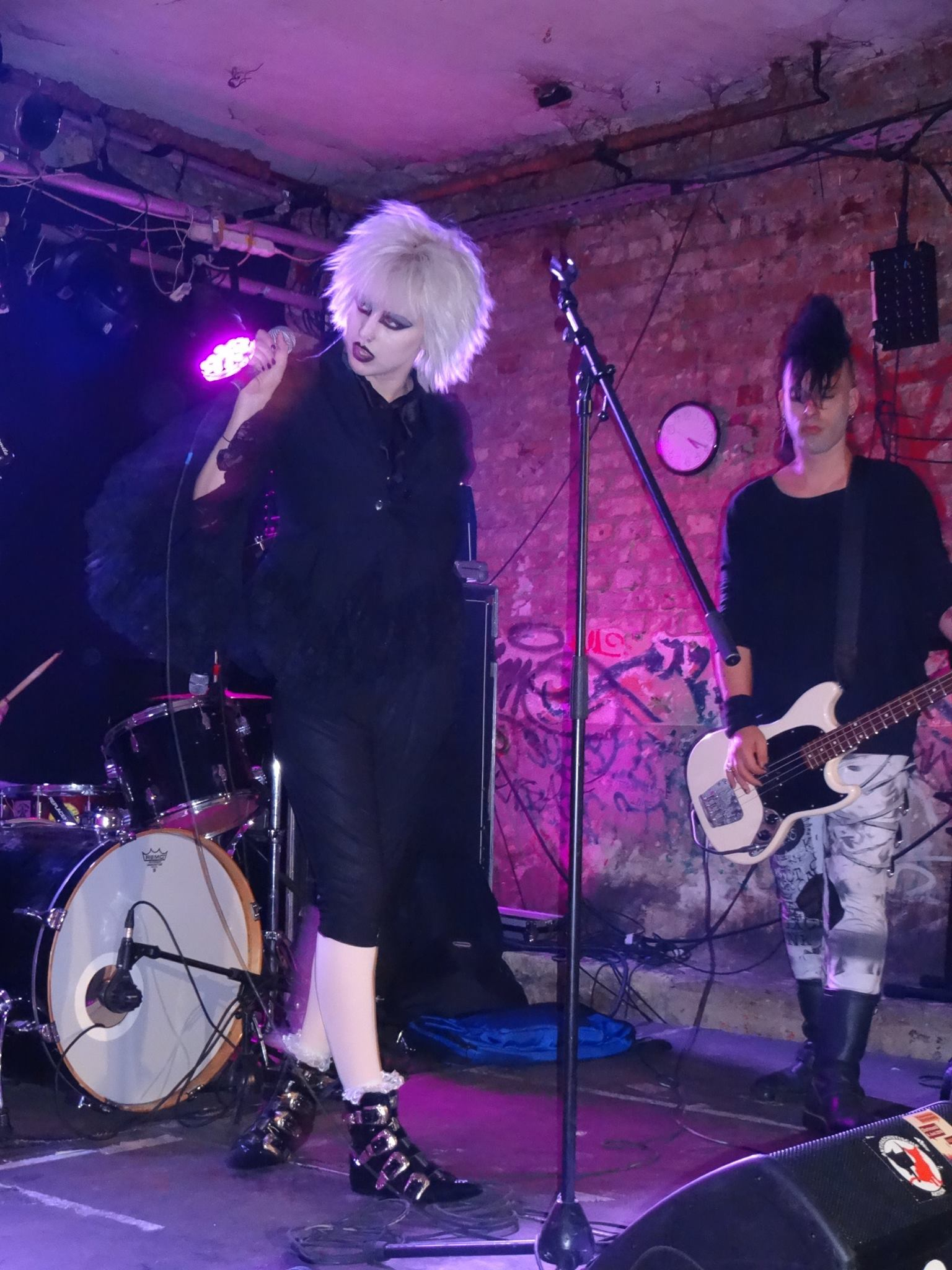

Background information
- Origin: Helsinki, Finland
- Genres: Post-punk gothic rock
- Years active: 2012–2020
- Members: Suzi Sabotage; Jacques Saph; William Freyermuth
- Website: www.masquerade.fi

Masquerade was a post-punk band from Finland, formed in late 2012. They have made television appearances on Finnish channels Yle Teema and MTV3, and appeared on Helsingin Sanomat. They have toured United States of America, Japan, Brazil, Mexico, and in numerous European countries. In August 2016, Masquerade signed on Danse Macabre Records.

In June 2017, the band played at Wave-Gotik-Treffen, one of the largest dark alternative music festivals in the world.

== Band members ==
- Suzi Sabotage – vocals
- Jacques Saph – bass
- William Freyermuth – drums, percussion

== Discography ==
- demo (August 2013)
- Blood is the New Black, EP, (October 2014)
- Ritual, LP, (15 July 2016)
- Ritual, CD, (14 October 2016)
- Where Nobody Can Hear You Scream (13 November 2018)

=== Music videos ===
- Needle Through a Bug, (October 2013)
- All Things Hurt, (June 2014)
- Panic Paranoia, (December 2015)
- Deathmarch, (December 2016)
- Too Depressed to Dance, (June 2017)
- Russian Roulette, (August 2018)
