= Venus (surname) =

Venus is a surname. Notable people with the surname include:

- Brenda Venus, American actor and ballet dancer
- Mark Venus (born 1967), English football coach and former player
- Michael Venus (born 1987), New Zealand tennis player
- Michael Venus (entertainer) (born 1973), Canadian television personality
