= Venus Fly Trap (band) =

English alternative rock band

- Origin: Northampton, England
- Genres: Alternative rock
- Years active: 1986–present
- Labels: Tuesday, Danceteria, Spectre, Soundbuster, Big Blue
- Members: Alex Novak; Andy Denton
- Past members: Tony Booker; Dave Freak; Chris Evans; John Novak; Tim Perkins; Curtis Johnson; Nigel Jones; Lucci; Nathan Bundy; Gary Lennon; Neil Ridley; Alex Ward; Brian Ansell; Matt Felce; Simon Alexander
- Website: www.spiralarchive.com

Venus Fly Trap are a British alternative rock band formed in Northampton in the late 1980s. They have released eight studio albums, the first in 1988 and the most recent in 2018.

== History ==
The band was formed by Alex Novak (vocals, formerly of Religious Overdose, Attrition, and The Tempest) and John Novak (guitar, vocals, formerly Where's Lisse?), and Tony Booker on bass guitar prior to their debut twelve-inch single "Morphine" in March 1988.

A further single followed later that year - the three-track Desolation Railway 12 inch EP - before they signed to French label Danceteria and released their debut mini album Mars in 1988, collecting tracks from the earlier singles alongside several new numbers.

The band's lineup changed frequently, with key members including guitarists Curtis Johnson and John Novak, Dave Freak (guitar, percussion, vocals), Chris Evans (bass) and Andy Denton (initially on drums, later guitar, programming, vocals). Their next album, Totem, was released in late 1989, preceded by a single featuring a cover version of Suicide's "Rocket USA" produced by Kevin Haskins (Love & Rockets / Bauhaus) and featuring The Jazz Butcher.

During this period the band played across the UK and Europe, and supported a variety of acts including Spacemen 3, Tom Verlaine, The Mission, and Red Lorry Yellow Lorry.

In 1990 Nathan Bundy (keyboards) and Denton joined Novak, Curtis and Nigel Jones (bass) to form the band that would tour Czechoslovakia in early 1991 culminating with the release of their only live album Jewel - Live In Prague. Pandora's Box produced by Pat Fish (The Jazz Butcher) followed in 1992, their last studio album for Danceteria, although the label issued a compilation Shedding Another Skin later that year.

The line-up changed again, with Novak and Denton reforming the band with Gary Lennon (guitar) and Neil Ridley (bass) releasing the album Luna Tide in early 1995. They toured extensively in Europe where they had a large fanbase, and released the electronic influenced album Dark Amour for German label Soundbuster in 1997, with tracks produced by Martin Bowes (Attrition).

As of the 2000s the permanent members are Novak and Denton, the duo co-writing the albums Zenith (2004) and Nemesis (2011) for the Polish label Big Blue, and most recently Icon (2018) for Glass Modern. Playing live constantly they have supported the likes of Martin Degville Sputnik2, Theatre of Hate, Spear of Destiny, Pop Will Eat Itself, Killing Joke and Attrition.

Novak also released more electronic-oriented music under the names Nova Galaxie Robotnik and Novak State Conspiracy with Simon Coleby (2000AD Comic Book Artist).

== Musical style ==
The band described their sound as "Bladerunner sci-fi rock 'n' roll mixed with acidic cinematic visions". MC5 and The Stooges were other reference points while the use of drum-machine on early singles recalls Sisters Of Mercy. They have been characterised as experimental rock, drawing comparisons to Christian Death, also being compared to Joy Division, with goth rock influences. Novak's vocals were often compared to Jim Morrison. Allmusic described their sound as "darkened noise that's accompanied by a flowing of sense of bleak, electronic rhythm".

== Discography ==
=== Albums ===
- Mars (1988), Danceteria - expanded edition released 2007
- Totem (1989), Danceteria
- Pandora's Box (1992), Danceteria
- Luna Tide (1995), Spectre
- Dark Amour (1997), Soundbuster
- Zenith (2004), Big Blue
- Nemesis(2011), Big Blue
- Icon (2018), Glass Modern

Live albums

- Jewel - Live In Prague (1991), A.Z.Y.L.

Compilations

- Shedding Another Skin (1992), Danceteria
- Anthology of the Food (2001), Spiral Archive
- Metamorphosis 1987 - 2007 (2007), Big Blue

=== Singles and EPs ===
- "Morphine" (1988), Tuesday
- "Desolation Railway" (1988), Tuesday
- "Rocket USA" (1989), Danceteria
- Europa EP (1990), Danceteria
- "Achilles Heel" (1991), Danceteria

=== DVD ===
- Celluloid (2006)
