= Venus de Milo =

Ancient Greek marble statue of Aphrodite

- Ἀφροδίτη τῆς Μήλου
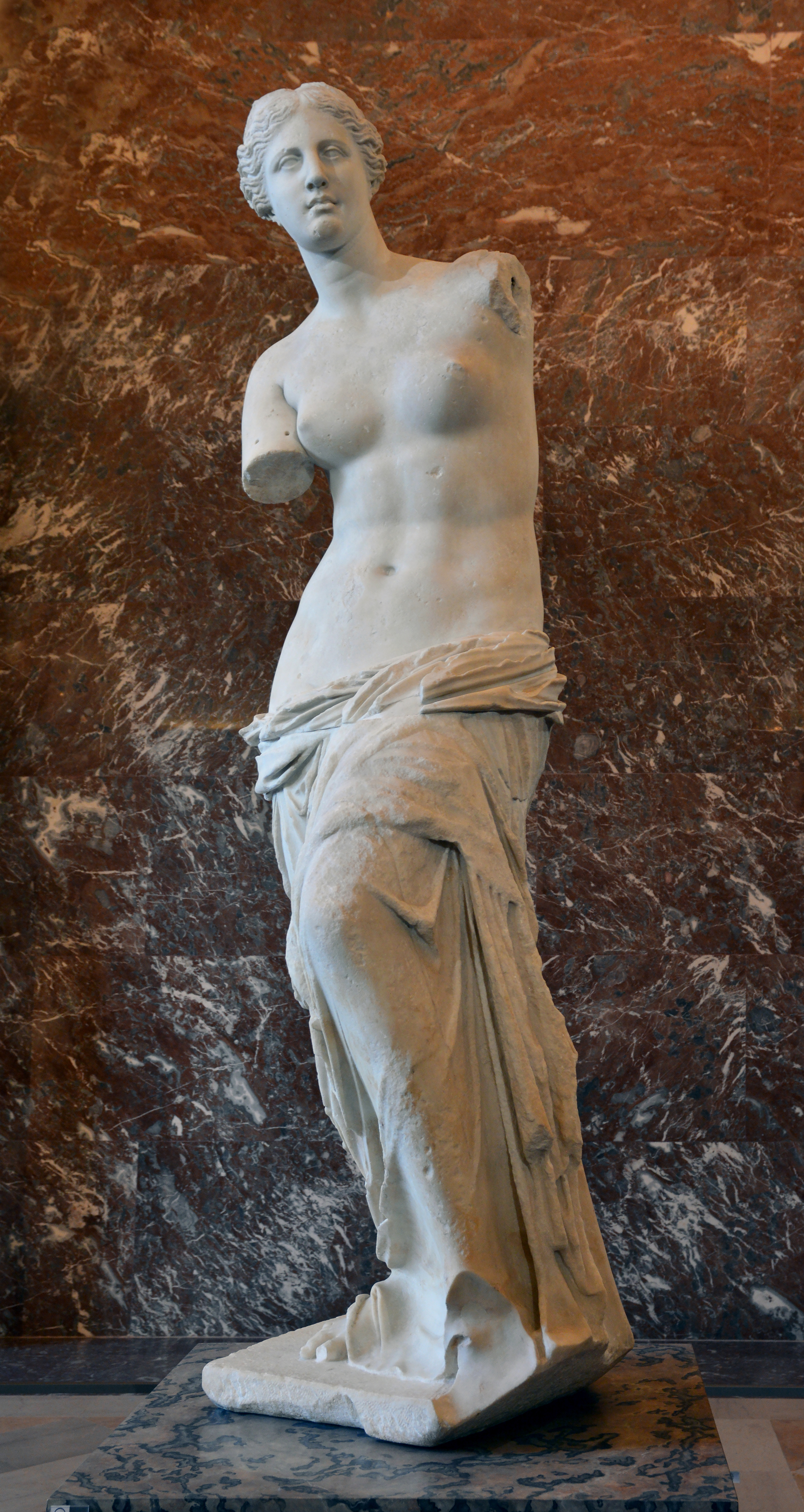
- Year: 2nd century BC
- Medium: Parian marble
- Subject: Aphrodite (Venus)
- Dimensions: 204 cm (6 ft 8 in) (Note: Sources vary on the exact height of the Venus. Gregory Curtis reports that it is 201 cm (6 ft 7 in). Brill's New Pauly says 203 cm (6 ft 8 in). The Louvre's online catalogue states 204 cm (6 ft 8 in). Christofilis Maggidis says 211 cm (6 ft 11 in). Alain Pasquier says 204 cm (6 ft 8 in) excluding the plinth, or 211 cm (6 ft 11 in) including it.)
- Condition: Arms broken off; otherwise intact
- Location: Louvre, Paris

The Venus de Milo or Aphrodite of Melos (Note: /də ˈmaɪloʊ, də ˈmiːloʊ/ də MY-loh, də MEE-loh; Ancient Greek: Ἀφροδίτη τῆς Μήλου, romanized: Aphrodítē tēs Mḗlou) is an ancient Greek marble sculpture that was created during the Hellenistic period. Its exact dating is uncertain, but the modern consensus places it in the 2nd century BC, perhaps between 160 and 110 BC. It was discovered in 1820 on the island of Milos, Greece, and has been displayed at the Louvre in Paris since 1821. Since the statue's discovery, it has become one of the most famous works of ancient Greek sculpture in the world.

The Venus de Milo is believed to depict Aphrodite, the Greek goddess of love, whose Roman counterpart was Venus. Made of Parian marble, the statue is larger than life size, standing over 2 metres (6 ft 7 in) high. The statue is missing both arms. The original position of these missing arms is uncertain. The sculpture was originally identified as depicting Aphrodite holding the apple of discord as a marble hand holding an apple was found alongside it; recent scientific analysis supports the identification of this hand as part of the sculpture. On the basis of a now-lost inscription found near the sculpture, it has been attributed to Alexandros from Antioch on the Maeander, though the name on the inscription is uncertain and its connection to the Venus is disputed.

The Venus de Milo rapidly became a cornerstone of the Louvre's antiquities collection in the aftermath of the Napoleonic Wars, and its fame spread through distribution in photographs and three-dimensional copies. The statue inspired over 70 poems, influenced 19th-century art and the Surrealist movement in the early 20th century, and has been featured in various modern artistic projects, including film and advertising. Classical scholars initially considered the sculpture to date to early fourth century BC, considered the high point of classical art, and widely praised its technical excellence. However, following its reinterpretation in the late nineteenth century as a work of the Hellenistic period, some scholars have been more critical of the Venus.

== Description ==
The Venus de Milo is an over 2 metres (6 ft 7 in) tall Parian marble statue of a Greek goddess, most likely Aphrodite, depicted with a bare torso and drapery over the lower half of her body. The figure stands with her weight on her right leg, and the left leg raised; her head is turned to the left. The statue is missing both arms, the left foot, and the earlobes. There is a filled hole below her right breast that originally contained a metal tenon that would have supported the right arm.

The Venus' flesh is polished smooth, but chisel marks are still visible on other surfaces. The drapery is more elaborately carved on the right-hand side of the statue than the left, perhaps because on the left-hand side it was originally obscured from view. Likewise the Venus is less finely-finished from behind, suggesting that it was originally intended to be viewed only from the front. While the body of the Venus is depicted in a realistic style, the head is more idealised. The lips are slightly open, showing teeth, and the eyes and mouth are small. The sculpture has been minimally restored: only the tip of the nose, lower lip, big toe on the right foot, and some of the drapery. (Note: Initially, a plaster left foot was also added to the statue; it was removed in 1883.)

Stylistically, the sculpture combines elements of classical and Hellenistic art. Features such as the small, regular eyes and mouth, and the strong brow and nose, are classical in style, while the shape of the torso and the deeply carved drapery are Hellenistic.

Kenneth Clark describes the figure as "the last great work of antique Greece", and "of all the works of antiquity one of the most complex and the most artful. ...[the sculptor] has consciously attempted to give the effect of a 5th-century work", while also using "the inventions of his own time"; "the planes of her body are so large and calm that at first we do not realise the number of angles through which they pass. In architectural terms, she is a baroque composition with classic effect".

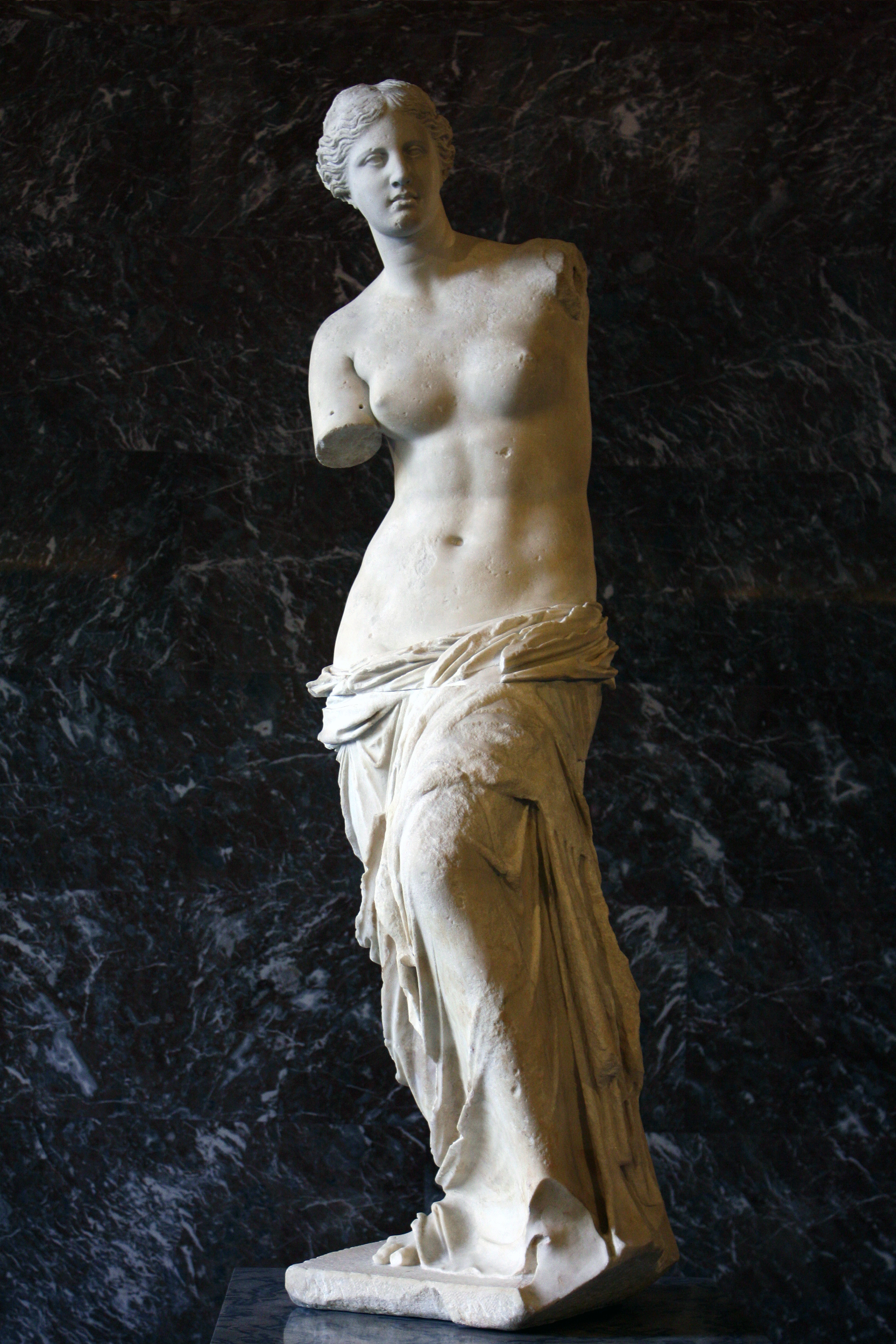
Front view

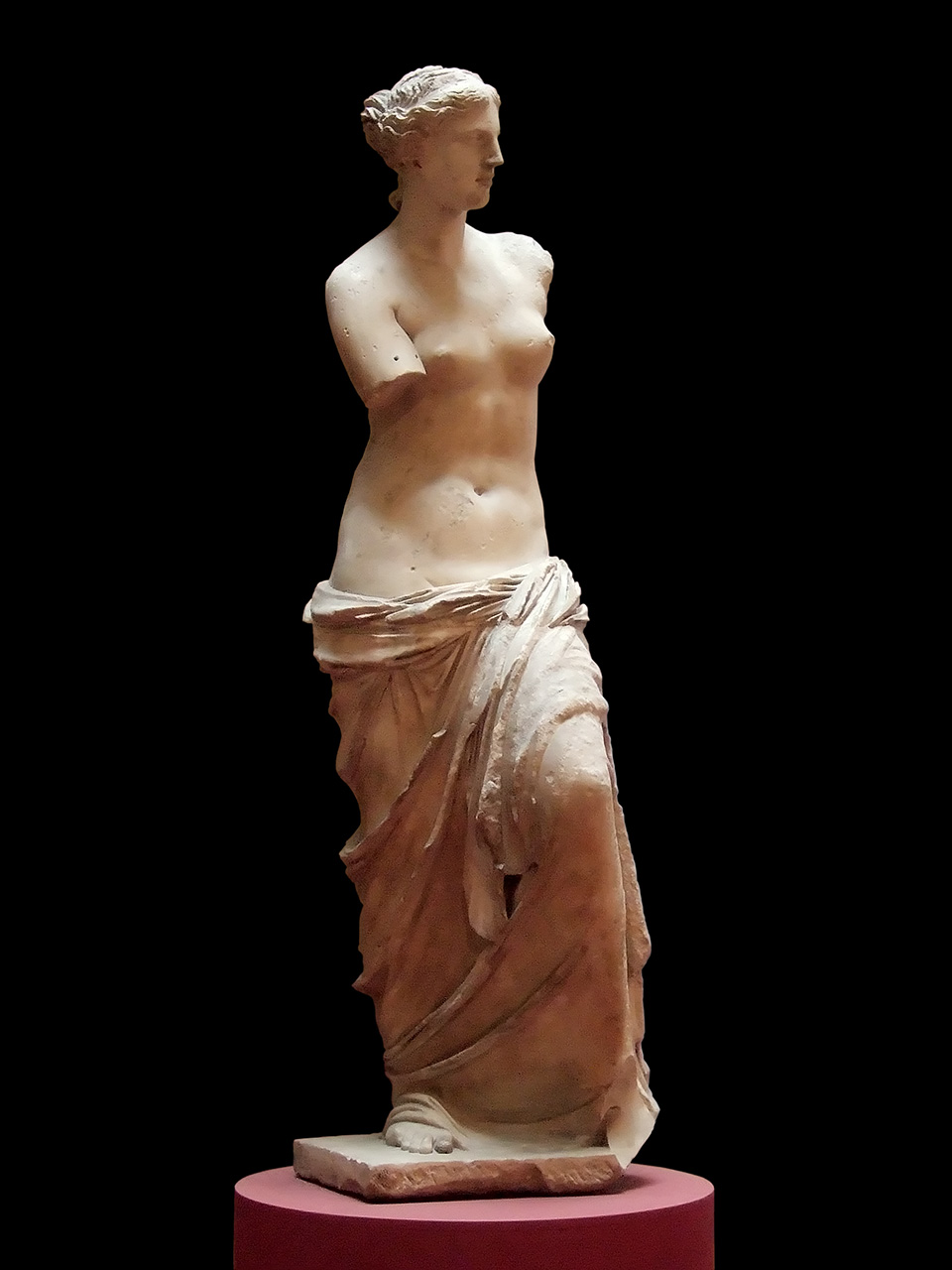
Three-quarter view

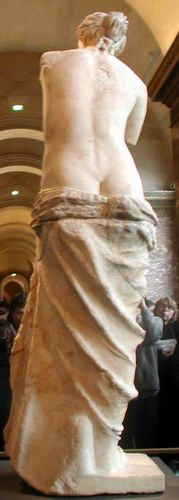
Back view

== Discovery ==
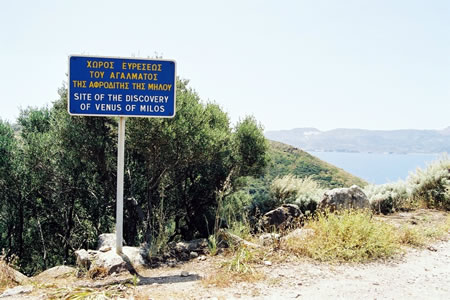
Site of the discovery of the Venus de Milo

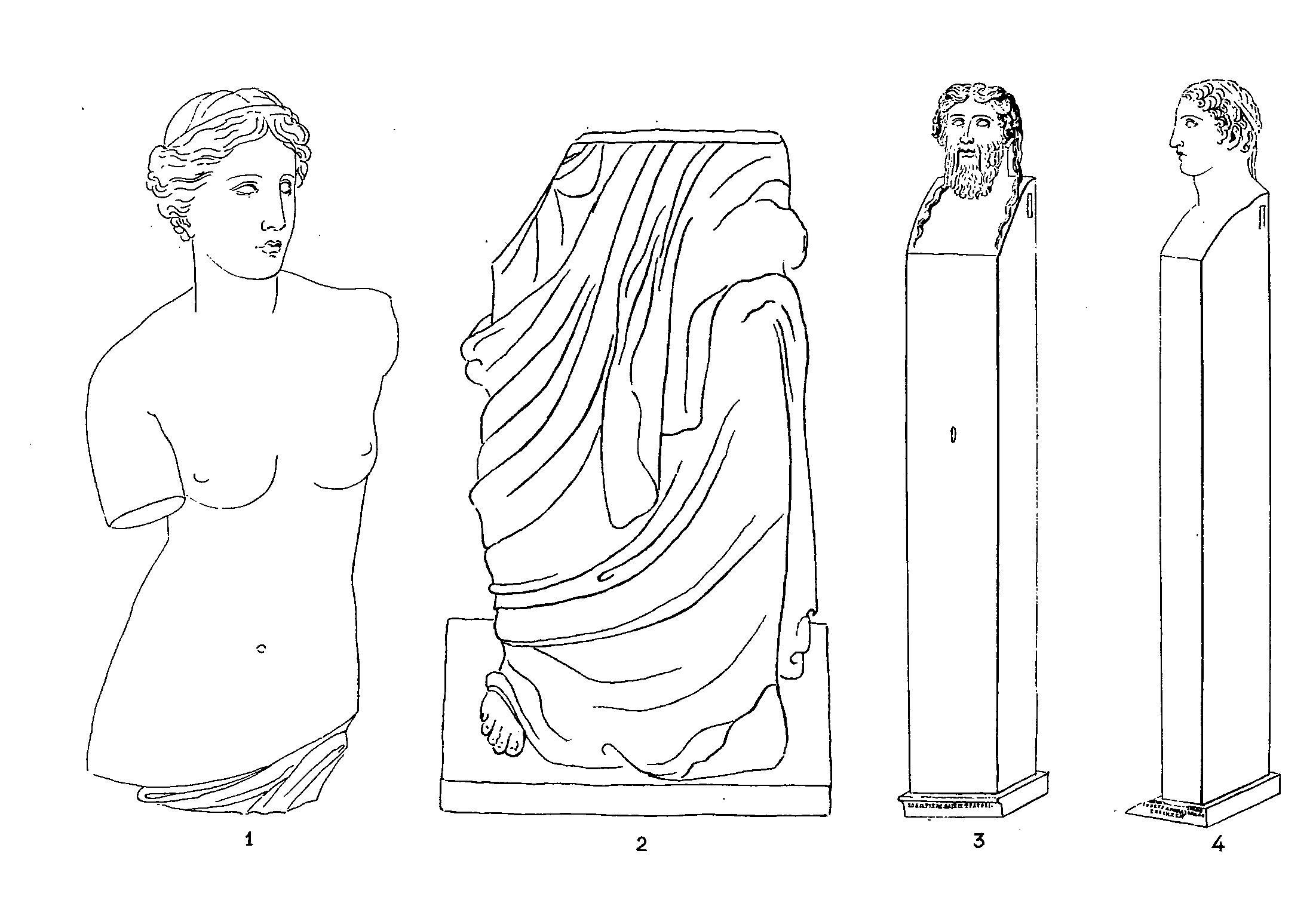
Sketch of the Venus and two herms found with it by Olivier Voutier, made shortly after the discovery

The Venus de Milo was discovered on 8 April 1820 by a Greek farmer on the island of Milos, then still part of the Ottoman Empire. Olivier Voutier, a French sailor interested in archaeology, witnessed the discovery and encouraged the farmer to continue digging. Voutier and the farmer uncovered two large pieces of the sculpture and a third, smaller piece. A fragment of an arm, a hand holding an apple, and two herms were also found alongside the statue. Two inscriptions were also apparently found with the Venus. One, transcribed by Dumont D'Urville, a French naval officer who arrived on Milos shortly after the discovery, commemorates a dedication by one Bakchios son of Satios, (Note: The name Satios is not otherwise known; it has been suggested that the inscription should be emended to read Sattos or S. Atios.) the assistant gymnasiarch. The other, recorded on a drawing made by Auguste Debay, preserves part of a sculptor's signature. Both inscriptions are now lost. Other sculptural fragments found around the same time include a third herm, two further arms, and a foot with sandal.

Dumont D'Urville wrote an account of the find. According to his testimony, the Venus statue was found in a quadrangular niche. If this findspot were the original context for the Venus, the niche and the gymnasiarch's inscription suggests that the Venus de Milo was installed in the gymnasium of Melos. An alternative theory proposed by Salomon Reinach is that the findspot was instead the remains of a lime kiln, and that the other fragments had no connection to the Venus; this theory is dismissed by Christofilis Maggidis as having "no factual basis".

After stopping in Melos, D'Urville's ship sailed to Constantinople, where he reported the find to the Comte de Marcellus, assistant to Charles François de Riffardeau, marquis de Rivière, the French ambassador. Rivière agreed that Marcellus should go to Melos to buy the statue. By the time Marcellus arrived at Melos, the farmer who discovered the statue had already received another offer to buy it, and it had been loaded onto a ship; the French intervened and Marcellus was able to buy the Venus. It was brought to France, where Louis XVIII had it installed in the Louvre. (Note: Sources differ on the exact details of the Louvre's acquisition of the Venus. Either de Rivière gave the sculpture to the king, or Louis bought it; according to Gregory Curtis, de Rivière "offered" the Venus to the king for the Louvre and the comte de Forbin, the curator of the Louvre, reimbursed de Rivière for the cost of the sculpture.) Contrary to the usual practice at the time, on the recommendation of Quatremère de Quincy, the Venus was not significantly restored but was exhibited in the state in which she was discovered. Quatremère, who believed that the Venus was originally part of a group with a sculpture of Mars, argued that as the entire Mars was missing it was impossible to restore the sculpture.

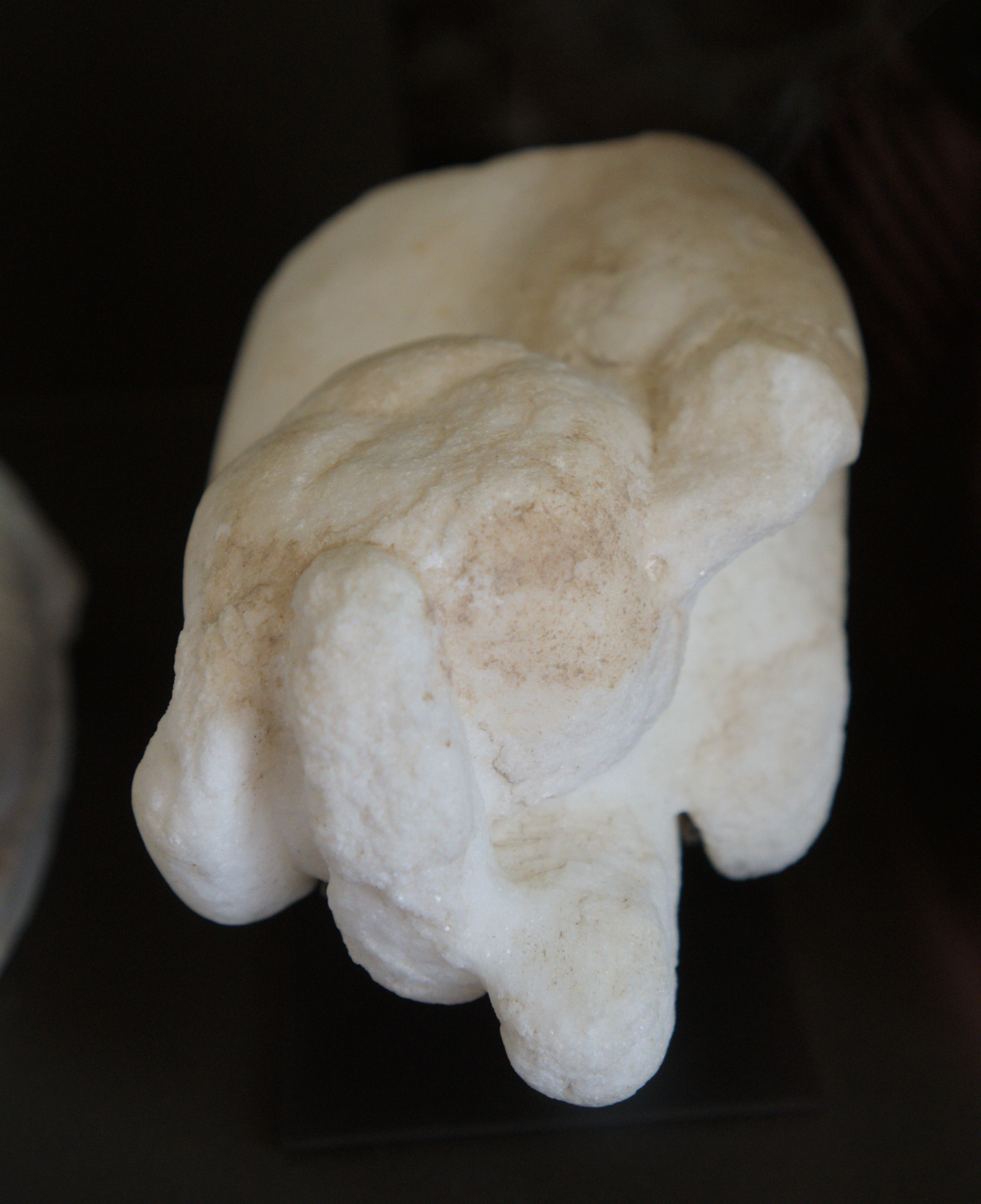
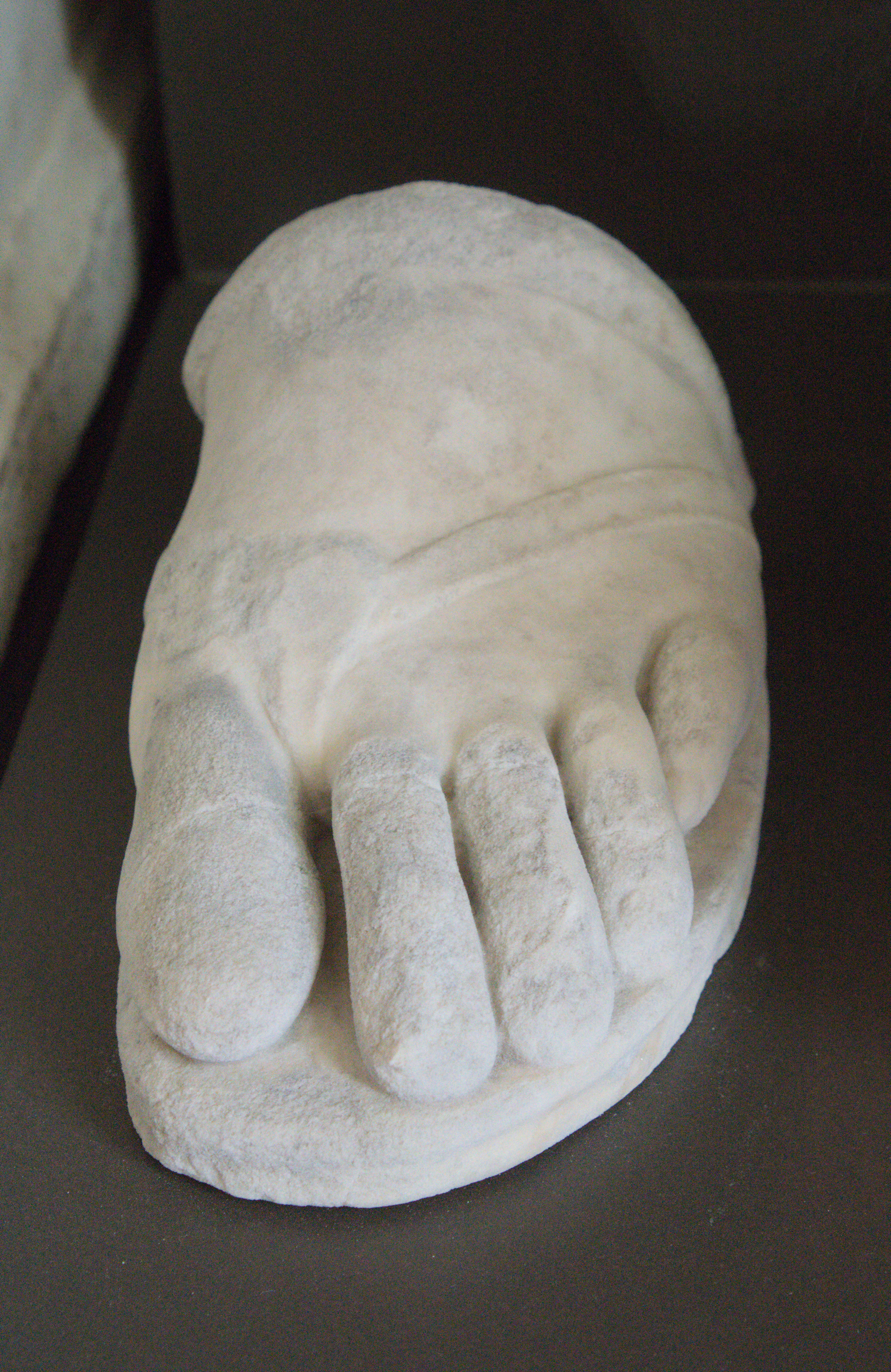
Two of the marble fragments found alongside the Venus: a hand holding an apple and a left foot

== Display ==
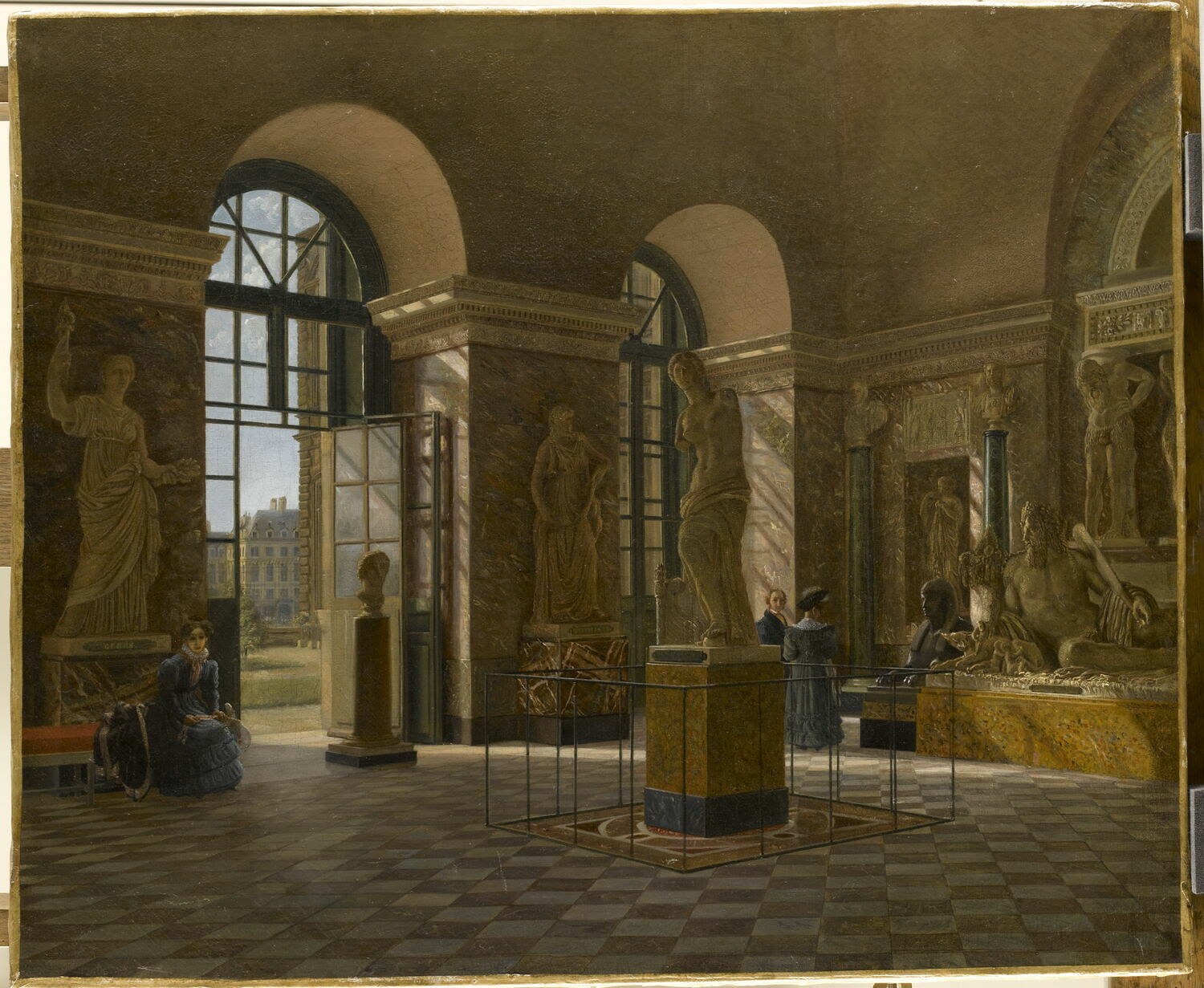
The Venus de Milo on display in the Louvre, c. 1824–1830, attributed to Joseph Warlencourt

The Venus de Milo was initially installed in the Louvre in 1821; it was rapidly moved twice before finding a long-term home in the Salle du Tibre where it remained until 1848. From there it was moved to the Salle de l'Isis, where it remained until being removed from the museum in 1870 for protection during the Paris Commune. When the Salle de l'Isis was renovated in the 1880s, the Venus was given a new pedestal which allowed spectators to rotate the sculpture; at the same time the approach to the sculpture was filled with other ancient Venus statues.

The Venus was among the works evacuated from Paris to the Church of the Jacobins in Toulouse during the First World War. After the war, the curator Paul Jamot proposed to display the Venus alongside the Leonardo's Mona Lisa and Michelangelo's Dying Slave and Rebellious Slave; this was never carried out. In 1936, the sculpture was once again moved, to the Salle de la Vénus de Milo to accommodate the volume of visitors to the Louvre; the other Venus statues were removed to focus visitors on the Venus de Milo. At this time the route for visitors through the Louvre was modified to be more chronological, coming through galleries of archaic and classical sculpture before arriving in a gallery dedicated to the Hellenistic period; the Venus de Milo was placed between the classical and Hellenistic galleries.

During the Second World War the sculpture was once again removed from the Louvre for safekeeping, and stored in the Château de Valençay; a plaster replica was displayed in its place. In 1964 it was exhibited in Tokyo and Kyoto; this is the only time the sculpture has left France since it was acquired by the Louvre. In 1972 an experiment was made with a new site for the sculpture, and it was temporarily moved to allow renovations in the 1980s and 1990s; by 1999 the volume of visitors to the Venus was causing problems and the Louvre authorities were considering returning the sculpture to its previous setting. In 2010 the sculpture was installed in its new setting, with the sculptural fragments discovered alongside it on display in the same room.

== Interpretation ==
=== Identification ===
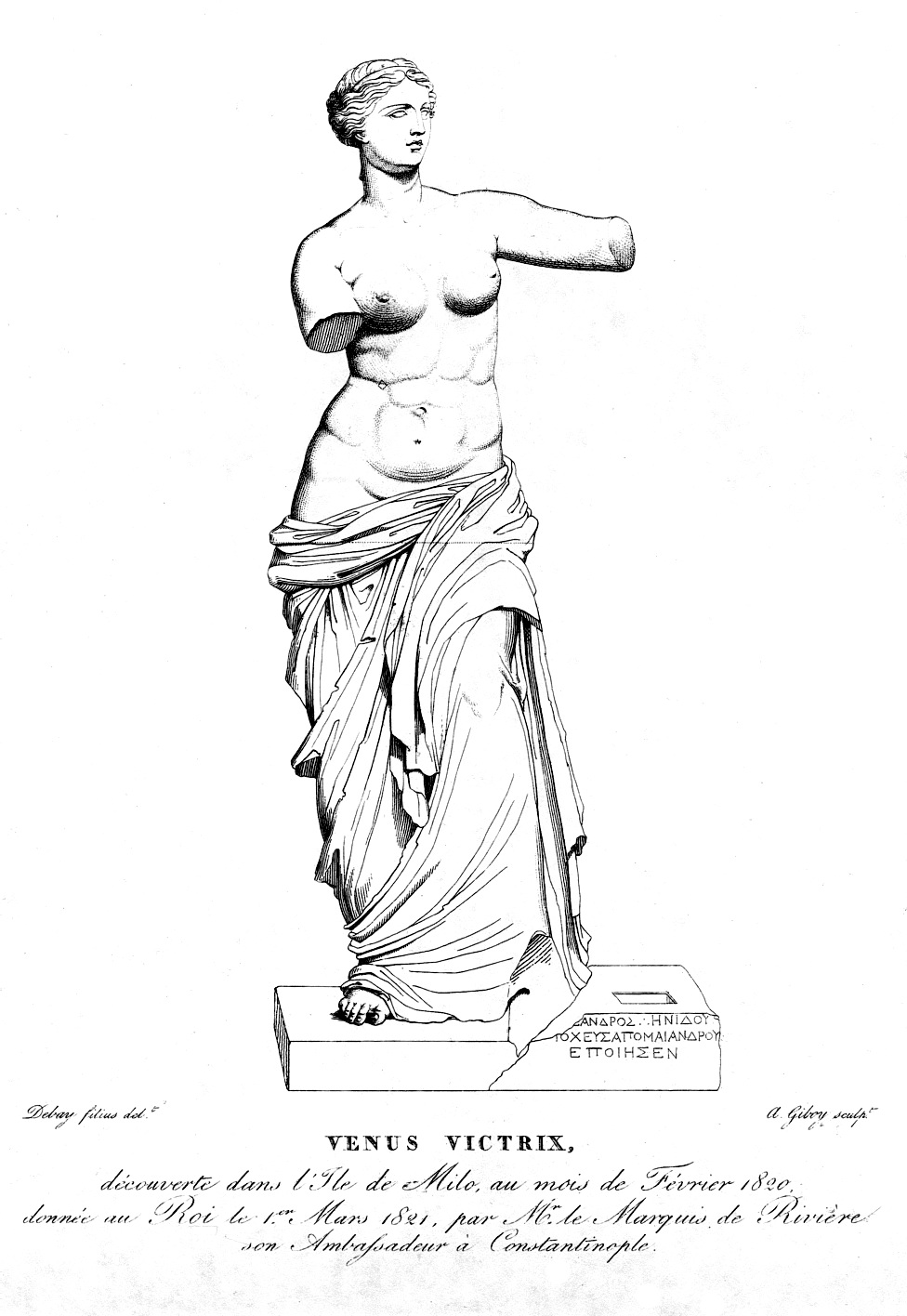
Venus de Milo drawn by Auguste Debay. The inscribed plinth, if originally part of the Venus, identifies the sculptor as [---]andros of Antioch on the Maeander and supports a date for the work in the Hellenistic period.

The Venus de Milo is likely a sculpture of the goddess Aphrodite, but its fragmentary state makes secure identification difficult. The earliest written accounts of the sculpture, by a French captain and the French vice-consul on Melos, both identify it as representing Aphrodite holding the apple of discord, apparently on the basis of the hand holding an apple found with the sculpture. An alternative identification proposed by Reinach is that she represents the sea-goddess Amphitrite, and was originally grouped with a sculpture of Poseidon from Melos, discovered in 1878. Other proposed identifications include a Muse, Nemesis, or Sappho.

The authorship and date of the Venus de Milo were both disputed from its discovery. Within a month of its acquisition by the Louvre, three French scholars had published papers on the statue, disagreeing on all aspects of its interpretation: Toussaint-Bernard Éméric-David thought it dated to c. 420 BC – c. 380 BC, between sculptors Phidias and Praxiteles; Quatremère de Quincy attributed it to the mid-fourth century and the circle of Praxiteles; and the Comte de Clarac thought it a later copy of a work by Praxiteles. The scholarly consensus in the 19th century was that the Venus dated to the fourth century BC. In 1893, Adolf Furtwängler was the first to argue that it was in fact late Hellenistic, dating to c. 150 BC – c. 50 BC, and this dating continues to be widely accepted.

One of the inscriptions discovered with the statue, which was drawn by Debay as fitting into the missing section of the statue's plinth, names the sculptor as [---]andros, son of [M]enides, of Antioch on the Maeander. (Note: The name has been restored as either Hagesandros or Alexandros. In 1901, Friedrich Hiller von Gaertringen argued for the restoration of the name as Alexandros, and associated the sculptor with a poet Alexandros, also from the Maeander region, who is named on an inscription from the Valley of the Muses at Thespiae.) The inscription must date to after 280 BC, when Antioch on the Maeander was founded; the lettering of the inscription suggests a date of 150–50 BC. Maggidis argues based on this inscription, as well as the style of the statue and the increasing prosperity of Melos in the period due to Roman involvement on the island which he suggests is a plausible context for the commissioning of the sculpture, that it probably dates to c. 150 BC – c. 110 BC. Rachel Kousser agrees with Furtwängler's dates for the sculpture. Marianne Hamiaux suggests c. 160 BC – c. 140 BC.

The association of the fragmentary artist's signature with the sculpture, and thus the identification of the sculptor as Alexandros of Antioch, is not universally accepted. Kousser and Jean-Luc Martinez both question this connection. Kousser notes that though the plaque is shown fitting into the broken base of the Venus in Debay's drawing, the drawing shows no evidence of the sculpture's missing left foot which would have rested on it, while in Voutier's sketch of the finds the plaque is shown as the base of one of the herms found alongside the Venus. As the inscription is lost, its connection to the Venus cannot be either proven or disproven.

Magiddis suggested that the Venus de Milo was carved by the same sculptor who also made the Poseidon of Melos. Isméni Trianti has suggested that three further sculptures found in Melos can be attributed to the same artist: two statues of women, and a colossal statue of a god.

=== Reconstructions ===
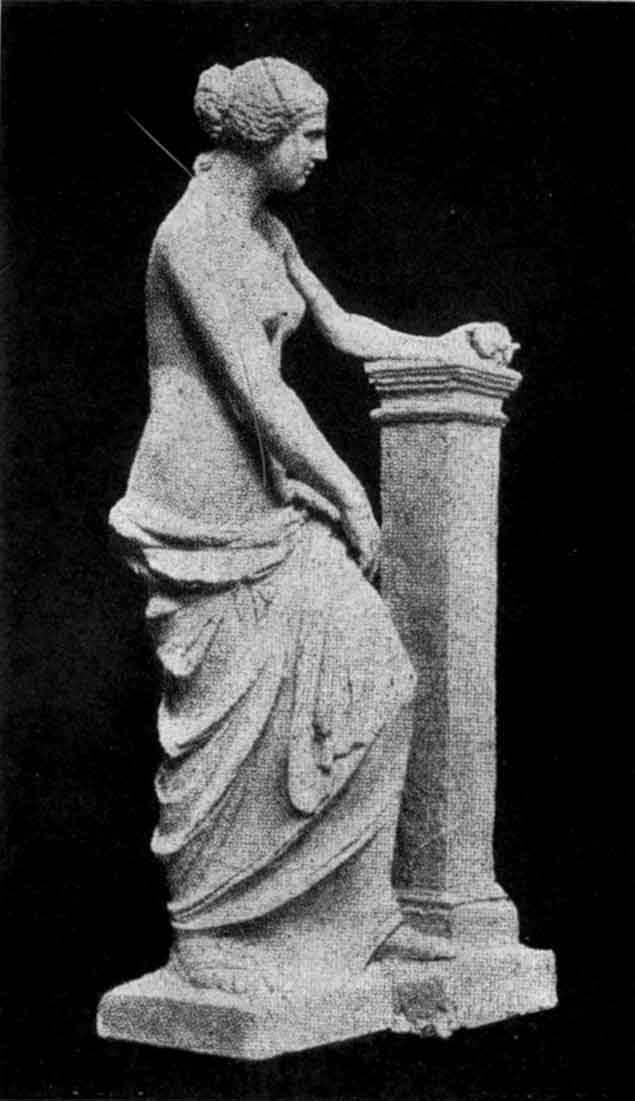
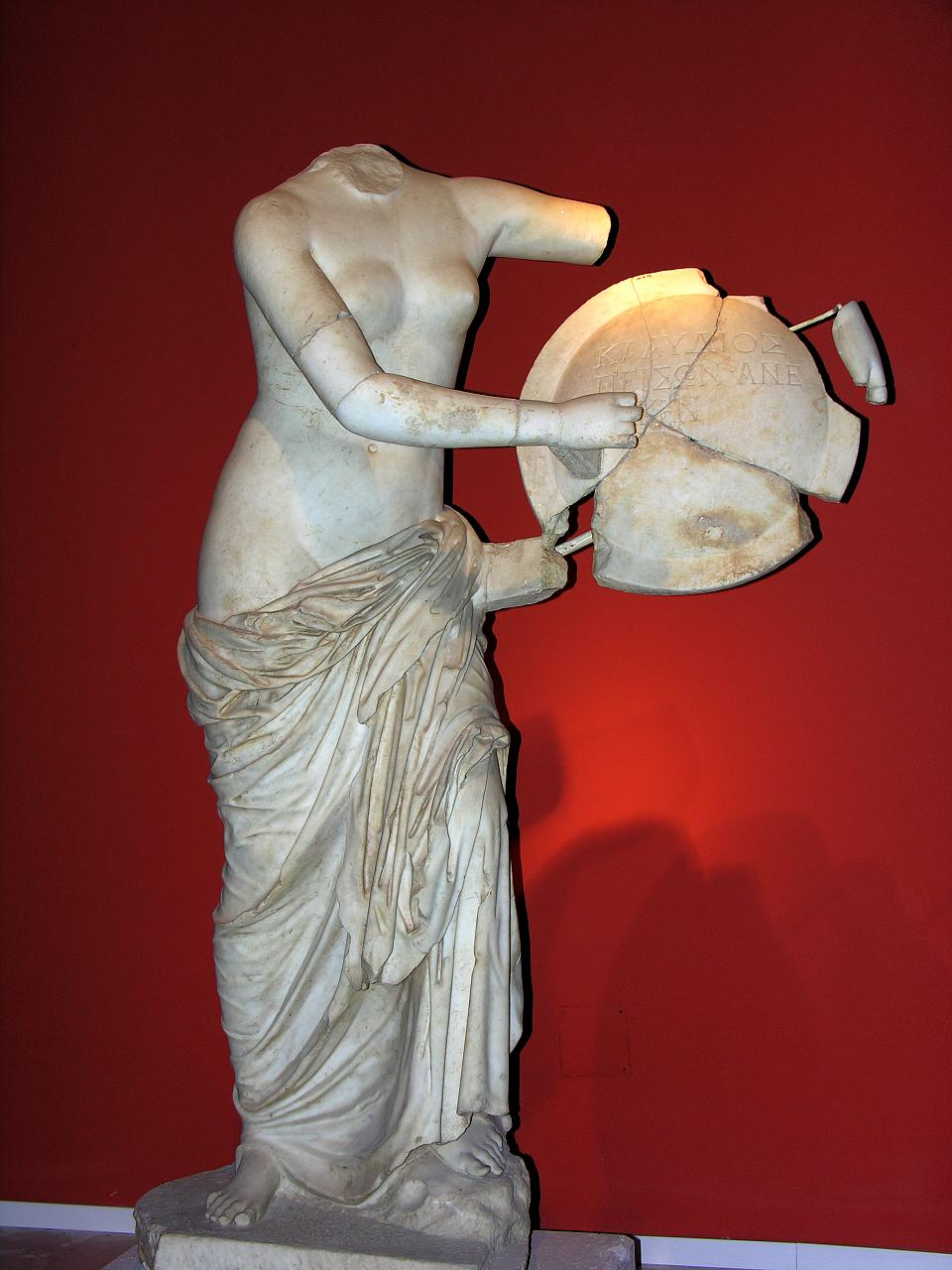
Many reconstructions of the Venus de Milo's original pose have been suggested. Adolf Furtwängler's suggestion (left) of Venus holding the apple is widely accepted. Marianne Hamiaux has argued that the figure originally held a shield, like the Perge Aphrodite (right).

Without arms, it is unclear what the statue originally looked like. The original appearance of the Venus has been disputed since 1821, with de Clarac arguing that the Venus was a single figure holding an apple, whereas Quatremere held that she was part of a group, with her arms around another figure. Other proposed restorations have included the Venus holding wreaths, a dove, or spears.

Wilhelm Fröhner suggested in 1876 that the Venus de Milo's right hand held the drapery slipping down from her hips, while the left held an apple; this theory was expanded on by Furtwängler. Kousser considers this the "most plausible" reconstruction. Scientific analyses conducted during restoration of the Venus in 2010 supported the theory that the arm fragment and hand holding the apple found alongside the sculpture were originally part of the Venus; Martinez argues that the identification of the sculpture as Venus holding an apple is thus definitively proved.

Hamiaux suggests that the Venus de Milo is of the same sculptural type as the Capuan Venus and another sculpture of Aphrodite from Perge. She argues that all derive from the cult statue in the temple of Aphrodite on the Acrocorinth, which depicted Aphrodite admiring herself in a shield. Christine Mitchell Havelock, who believes the Capuan Venus was based on the Venus de Milo, by contrast considers the Melian sculpture "a fresh invention" of the Hellenistic period.

== Reception ==
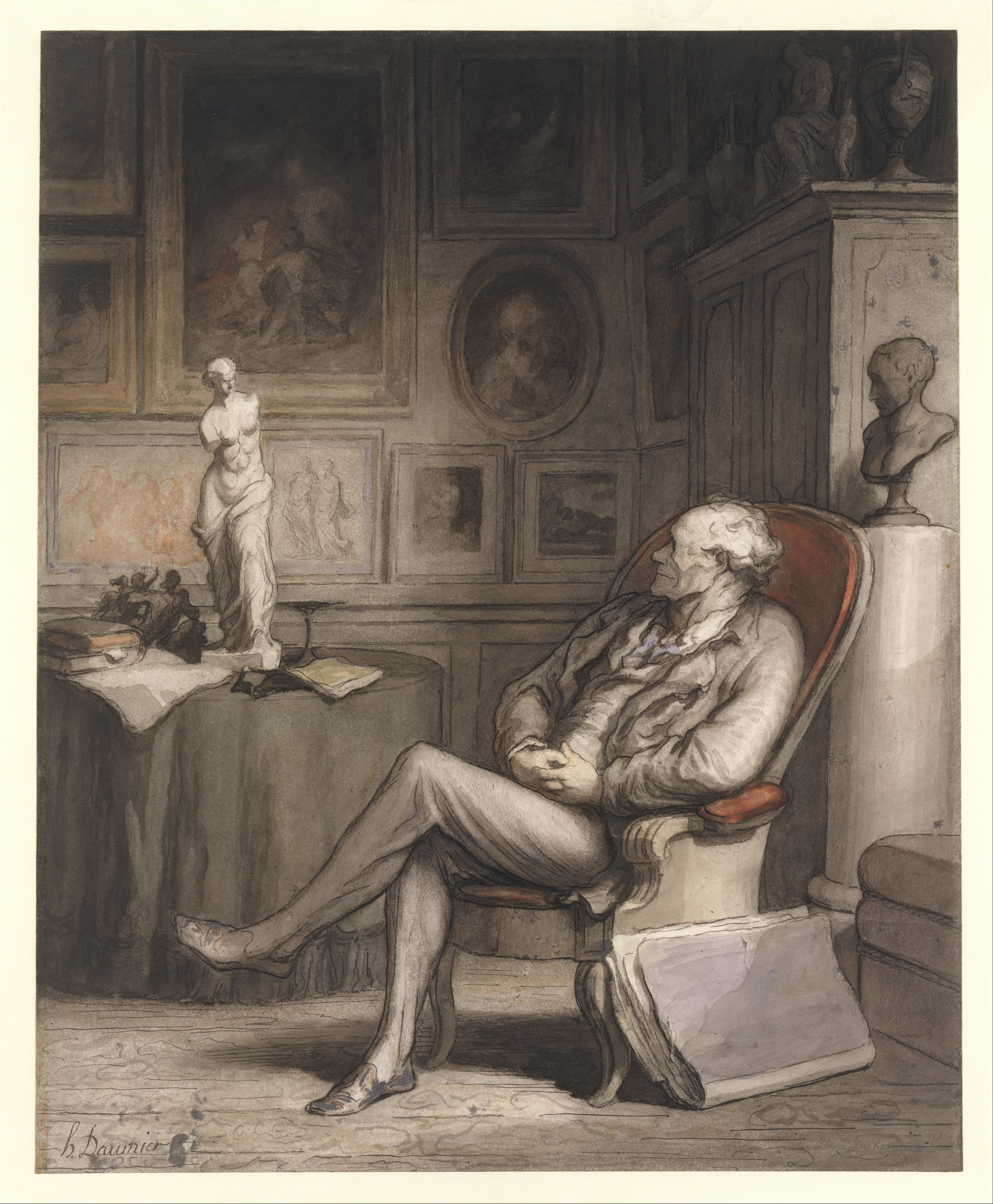
The Connoisseur (c. 1860 – c. 1865), by Honoré Daumier

No ancient source can be securely identified as discussing the Venus de Milo, and there are neither enough surviving ancient statues, nor enough evidence about how ancient Greeks judged artistic quality, to judge how the sculpture would have been received in the ancient world.

But, according to Kenneth Clark (in 1949), "within a few years of her discovery in 1820, the Venus de Milo had taken the central, impregnable position formerly occupied by the Venus de' Medici, and even now that she has lost favour with connoisseurs and archaeologists she has held her place in popular imagery as a symbol, or trade mark, of Beauty".

Today the Venus de Milo is perhaps the most famous ancient Greek statue in the world, seen by more than seven million visitors every year. It established itself as a key part of the Louvre's antiquities collection soon after its discovery. At this time, the Louvre had recently lost several major works following the Napoleonic Wars, as objects acquired by Napoleon were returned to their countries of origin. The Venus was soon one of the most famous antiquities in Europe; in the 19th century it was distributed in plaster casts, photographs, and bronze copies. A plaster cast was sent to the Berlin Academy in 1822, only a year after the Louvre acquired the Venus, and a cast was displayed at The Crystal Palace.

The Venus de Milo has been the subject of both literature and the visual arts since its discovery. More than 70 poems about the Venus have been published. 19th-century ekphrastic poetry about the Venus, for example that written by several Parnassian poets, helped establish its place as a significant piece in the art-historical canon, while in the early twentieth century poetry about the Venus focused more on the statue's erotic appeal. In the 19th century, paintings of the Venus often depicted statuettes of the figure, for instance in Honoré Daumier's The Connoisseur. 19th-century artists also used the Venus as a model: Max Klinger based the Minerva in his Judgement of Paris on the Venus de Milo; Eugène Delacroix may have used it for Liberty Leading the People.

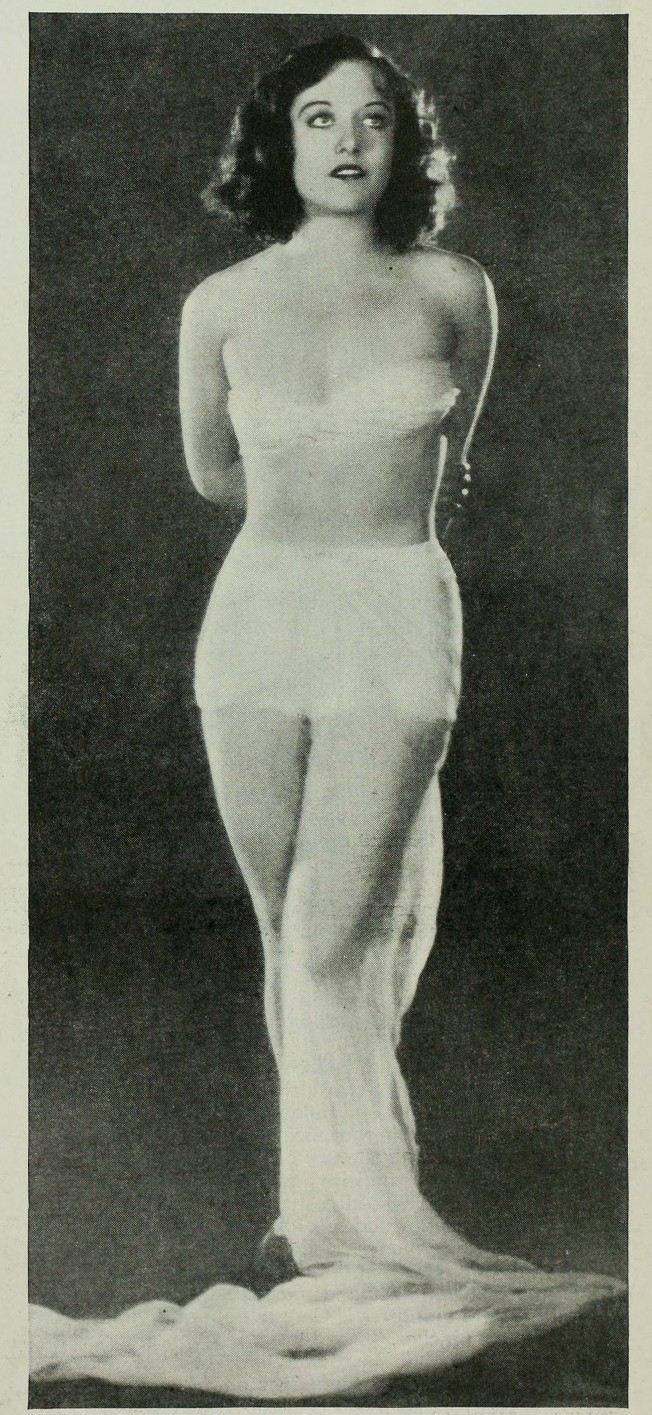
Joan Crawford posing as the Venus de Milo for a 1928 article in Photoplay

In the early 20th century, the Venus de Milo caught the attention of the surrealist movement. Erwin Blumenfeld and Clarence Sinclair Bull both made photomontages based on the Venus. Max Ernst used the Venus in his "instruction manuals"; René Magritte painted a plaster copy of the Venus, making her body pink, her robe blue, and leaving the head white; and Salvador Dalì based several paintings and sculptures, including his painting The Hallucinogenic Toreador, on her. In contemporary art, Niki de Saint-Phalle has used a reproduction of the Venus in a performance, Yves Klein produced a copy in International Klein Blue, and artists including Arman, Clive Barker, and Jim Dine have all made sculptures inspired by the Venus.

The iconic status of the Venus de Milo has meant that in the 20th century it has been used in film and advertising: a poster for the 1932 film Blonde Venus shows Marlene Dietrich as the Venus de Milo, while in 2003 Eva Green, wearing only a white sheet and black arm-length gloves, recreated the sculpture in The Dreamers. Actresses have frequently been compared to the Venus: an article in Photoplay in 1928 concluded the Joan Crawford was the Hollywood actress whose measurements most resembled the Venus de Milo, Clara Bow and Jean Harlow were both photographed as the Venus for magazines. Advertisements for Kellogg's cornflakes, an early speakerphone made by General Telephone & Electronics, Levi's jeans and Mercedes-Benz cars have all used the Venus.

In contrast with the popular and artistic appreciation of the Venus, since Fürtwangler re-dated the sculpture to the Hellenistic period some scholars have been more critical. In his History of Greek Art, Martin Robertson argues that the sculpture's reputation is due more to propaganda than to its own artistic merit. Scholars have concentrated on studying copies of classical sculpture mentioned in ancient sources, such as the Aphrodite of Knidos, over the Venus de Milo, even when those copies are generally considered to be technically inferior to the Venus; Elizabeth Prettejohn argues that this is due to classicists' bias towards written sources over visual ones.

== Sources ==
- Bonazzoli, Francesca; Robecchi, Michele (2014). Mona Lisa to Marge: How the World's Greatest Artworks Entered Popular Culture. New York: Prestel. ISBN 978-3791348773.
- Clark, Kenneth (1960) [1949]. The Nude: A Study in Ideal Form. Pelican.
- Curtis, Gregory (2003). Disarmed: The Story of the Venus de Milo. New York: Alfred A. Knopf. ISBN 978-0375415234. OCLC 51937203.
- Hamiaux, Marianne (2017). "Le type statuaire de la Venus de Milo". Revue archéologique. 1 (63): 65–83. doi:10.3917/arch.171.0065. JSTOR 44710356.
- Havelock, Christine Mitchell (1995). The Aphrodite of Knidos and her Successors: a Historical Review of the Female Nude in Greek Art. Ann Arbor: University of Michigan Press. ISBN 0-472-10585-X.
- Hiller von Gaertringen, Friedrich (1901). "Ein Beitrag zur Geschichte der Venus von Milo". Hermes. 36 (2): 305–308. JSTOR 4472781.
- Hinz, Berthold (2006). "Venus de Milo". Brill's New Pauly: Classical Tradition. doi:10.1163/1574-9347_bnp_e15308860.
- Kousser, Rachel (2005). "Creating the Past: The Vénus de Milo and the Hellenistic Reception of Classical Greece". American Journal of Archaeology. 109 (2): 227–250. doi:10.3764/aja.109.2.227. ISSN 0002-9114. JSTOR 40024510. S2CID 36871977.
- Lathers, Marie (2002). "A Masterpiece for a Modern Museum: The Venus de Milo". Contemporary French Civilisation. 26 (2).
- Maggidis, Christofilis (1998). "The Aphrodite and the Poseidon of Melos: A Synthesis". Acta Archaeologica. 69.
- Martinez, Jean-Luc (2022). La Vénus de Milo. Paris: Louvre éditions. ISBN 9-788412-154832.
- Milián, Orsolya (2024). "Ecphrastic Poetry on the Venus de Milo". Encounters In/Among Language, Literature, and Arts. Sapientia Hungarian University of Transylvania. doi:10.47745/ausp-2024-0009.
- Pasquier, Alain (1985). La Vénus de Milo: Les Aphrodites du Louvre. Paris: Éditions de la Réunion des Musées National. ISBN 2711802566.
- Pasquier, Alain (September 1999). "Les Voyages de la Vénus de Milo". Revue des Deux Mondes: 35–44. JSTOR 44187862.
- Prettejohn, Elizabeth (2006). "Reception and Ancient Art: The Case of the Venus de Milo". In Martindale, Charles; Thomas, Richard (eds.). Classics and the Uses of Reception. Malden, MA: Blackwell. ISBN 9780470774007.
- Suhr, Elmer G. (1960). "The Spinning Aphrodite in Sculpture". American Journal of Archaeology. 64 (3): 253–264. doi:10.2307/502465. JSTOR 502465. S2CID 191404726.
- Winkler, Martin (2018). "Aphroditê kinêmatographikê: Venus' varieties and vicissitudes". In Harloe, Katherine; Momigliano, Nicoletta; Farnoux, Alexandre (eds.). Hellenomania. London: Routledge. ISBN 9781315277370.
