= Miguel and the Living Dead =

Polish post punk goth rock death rock and gothabilly band

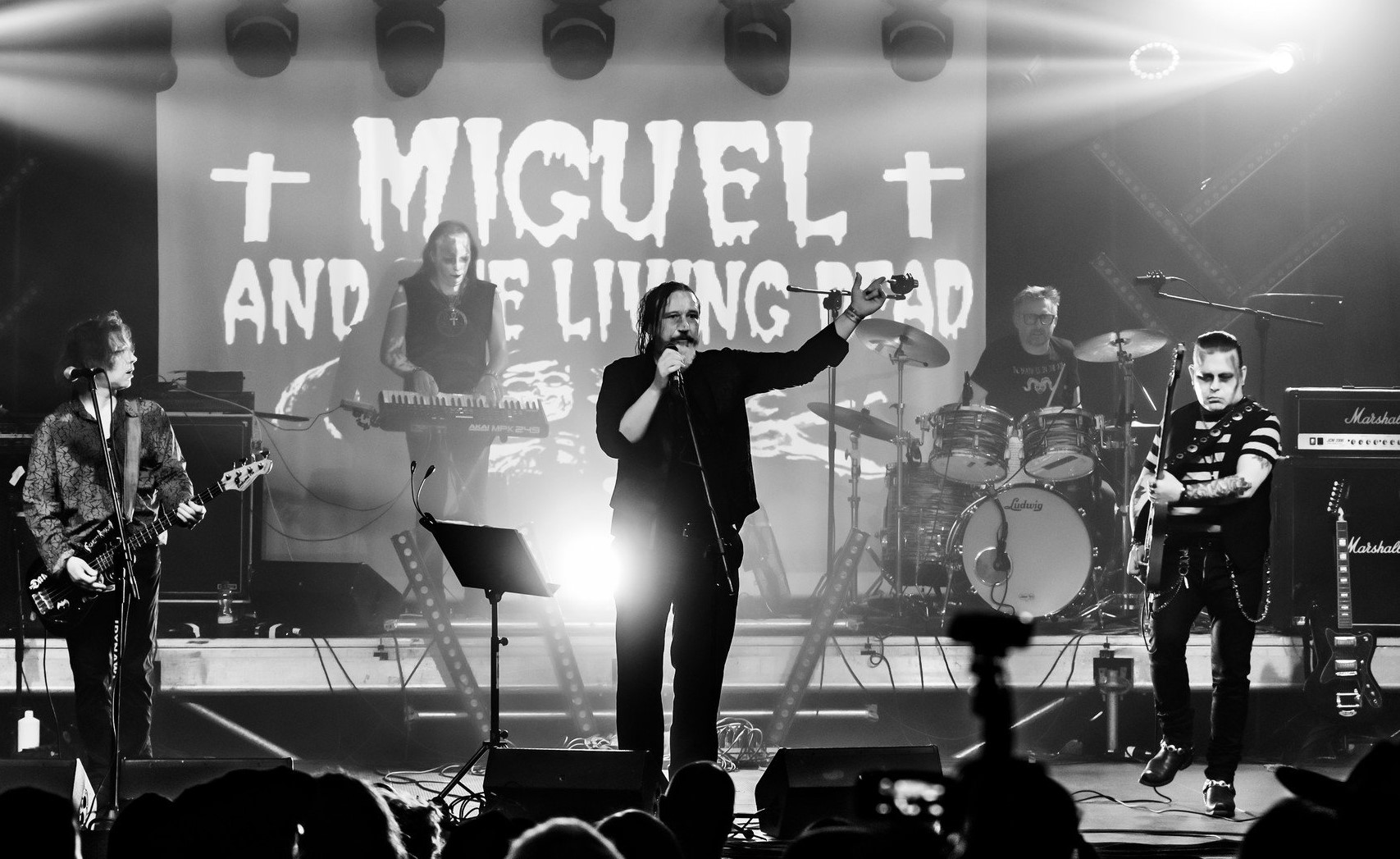
- MATLD in 2022: Klaus, Vins, Slavik, Stach, Pete

Background information
- Origin: Warsaw, Poland
- Genres: Post-punk, goth rock, horror punk, death rock, gothabilly
- Years active: 2001–2010, 2017–present
- Labels: Strobelight Records, Noise Annoys, Bat-Cave Productions, Piranha Music
- Spinoffs: Eva, Past, Wrony Na Śniegu, Hatestory, One Million Bulgarians, Syrbski Jeb, La Casa Usher, Miniskirt Blues, The Underrunners, TZN Xenna, Devilish Presley, Red Crap, Moron’s Morons, Zuvembie Necroneon
- Members: Pete Vincent; Killer Klaus; Slavik; Vins Vilaplana; Don Dzwonson
- Past members: see members list below
- Website: https://www.matld.com/

Miguel and the Living Dead are a Polish band established in Warsaw in 2001. Their music blends several styles associated with alternative rock scenes, including gothic rock, punk, deathrock, and psychobilly. From the beginning, the group has developed a recognizable stage aesthetic, performing in stylized costumes and theatrical make-up. Their lyrics and imagery frequently reference classic horror films and the visual atmosphere typical of 1980s pop culture.

Musically, the band draws on a wide range of influences. These include European gothic, punk, and post-punk groups, as well as the American deathrock tradition. Their sound also reflects elements of psychobilly and early rock and roll of the 1950s and 1960s, alongside stylistic touches associated with surf music, garage rock, rockabilly, country and ska.

== History ==
=== Formation and early years (2001-2004) ===
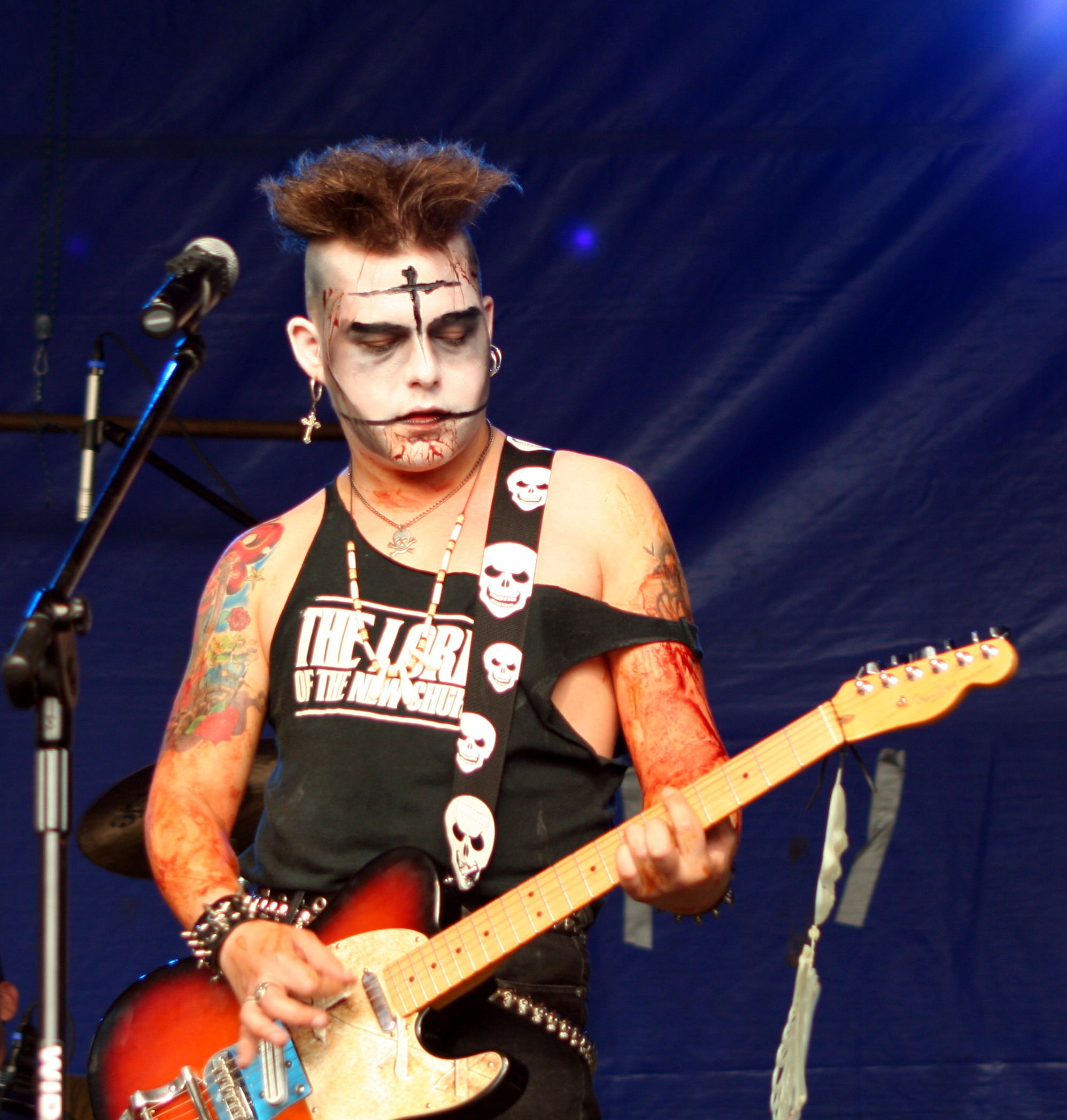
Pete Vincent aka Nerve 69, founder

Miguel and the Living Dead began as a one-man musical project created by Pete Vincent (also known as Nerve 69) in 2001. The earliest songs were written and recorded at home using a small personal computer. Among the first tracks were “Salem’s Lot,” “Night of Terror,” “Aliens Wear Sunglasses,” and “Train of the Dead.” At the turn of 2003 and 2004, Pete Vincent was joined by former members of the post-punk band Eva: Slavik (vocals), Killer Klaus (bass guitar), and El Diablo (drums).

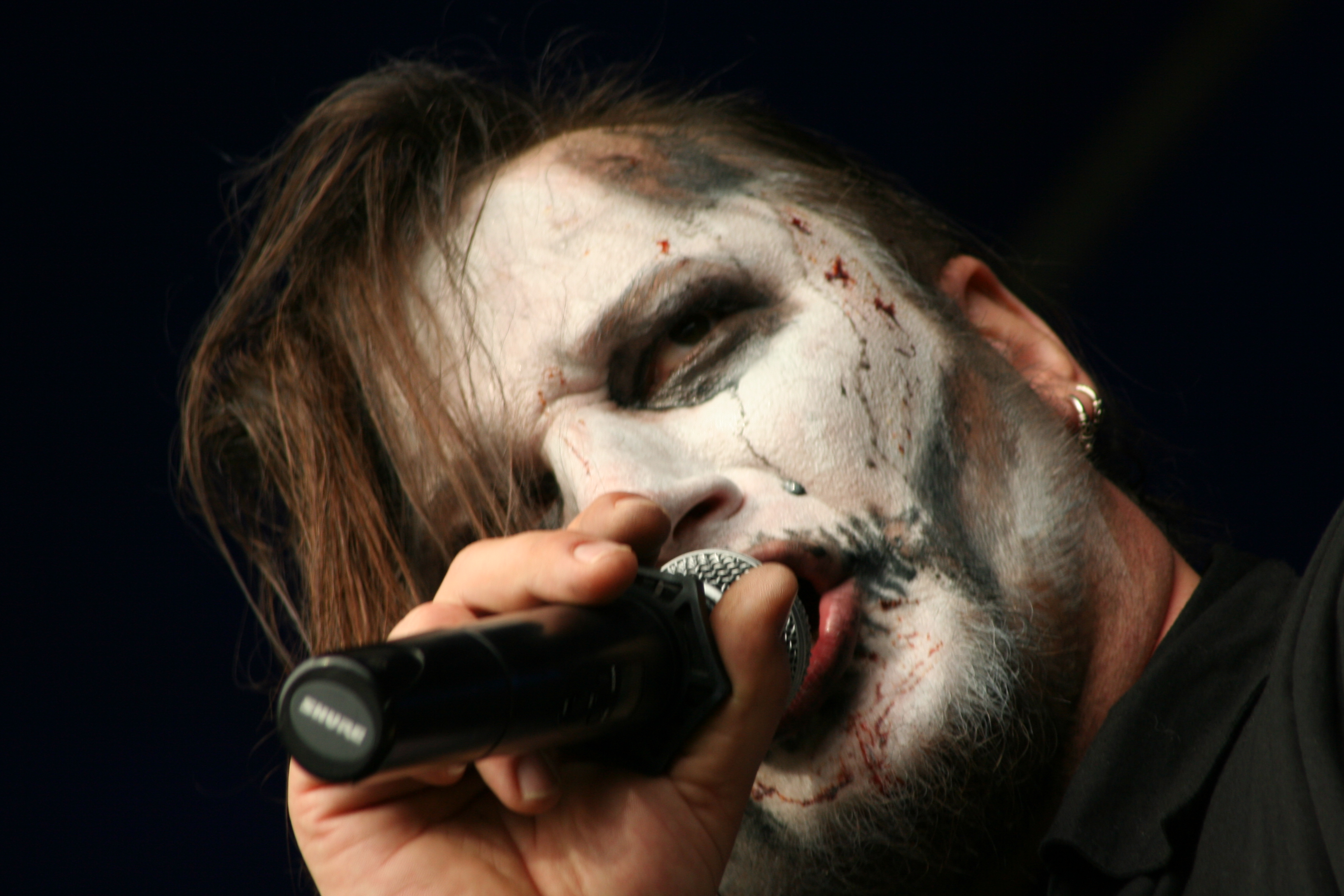
Slavik, vocalist

In February 2004, the band performed their first concert in Warsaw. Shortly before their live debut, the group released a CD-R titled Demo 2004. The recording included five songs written between 2001 and 2003, with Pete Vincent performing the instrumental parts and Slavik providing the vocals.

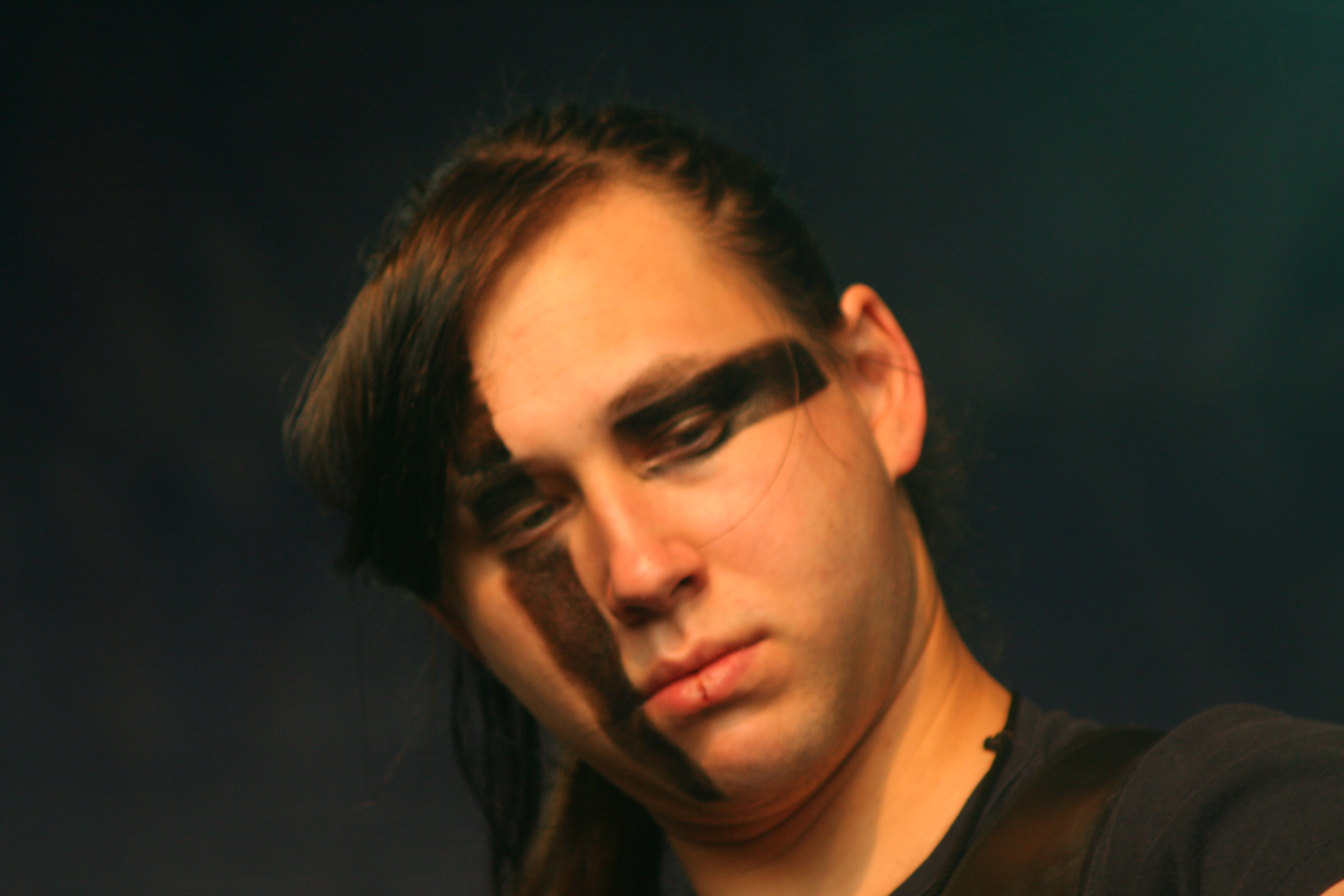
Killer Klaus, bass guitar

In the spring of 2004, keyboard player Goozzolini joined the band, completing the five-member line-up. The group subsequently performed a series of concerts throughout Poland, including a show at the Old Skull club in Warsaw alongside Phantom Limbs. Around the same time, they also played their first concert abroad, appearing at the Punk Aid festival in the Czech Republic, where they shared the stage with bands such as The Damned, Sex Gang Children and The Last Days Of Jesus.

During this period, the band received strong support from their friend and mentor Tomasz Zrąbkowski (also known as Maniak or Ghostmaniac), a Polish alternative and gothic music journalist, DJ, and the founder of the Old Skull event series.

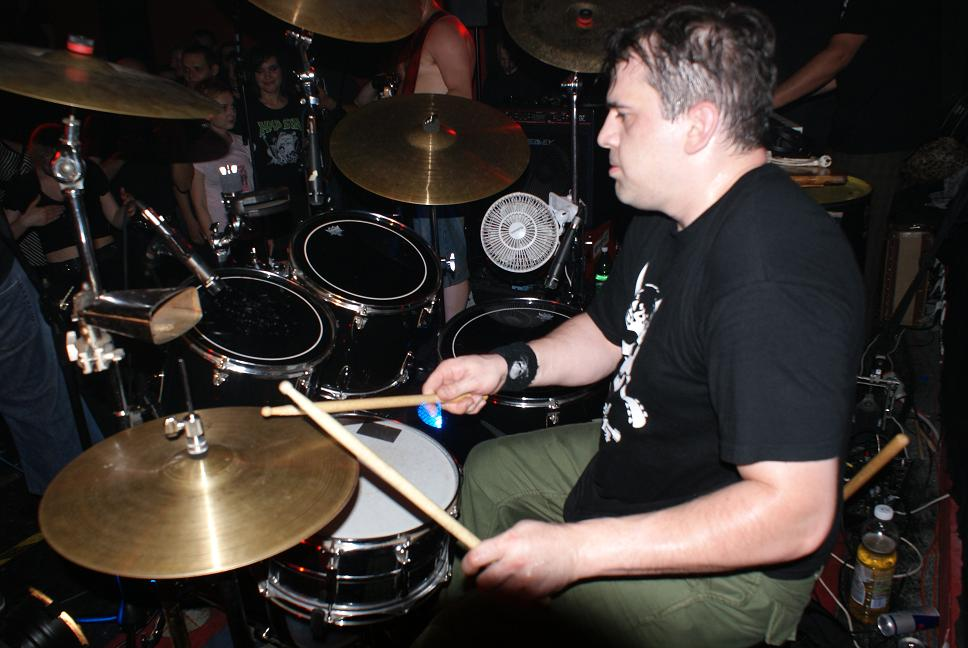
Niuniek El Diablo, drummer in the years: 2004-2010

=== Alarm!!! and Postcards From The Other Side (2005-2007) ===
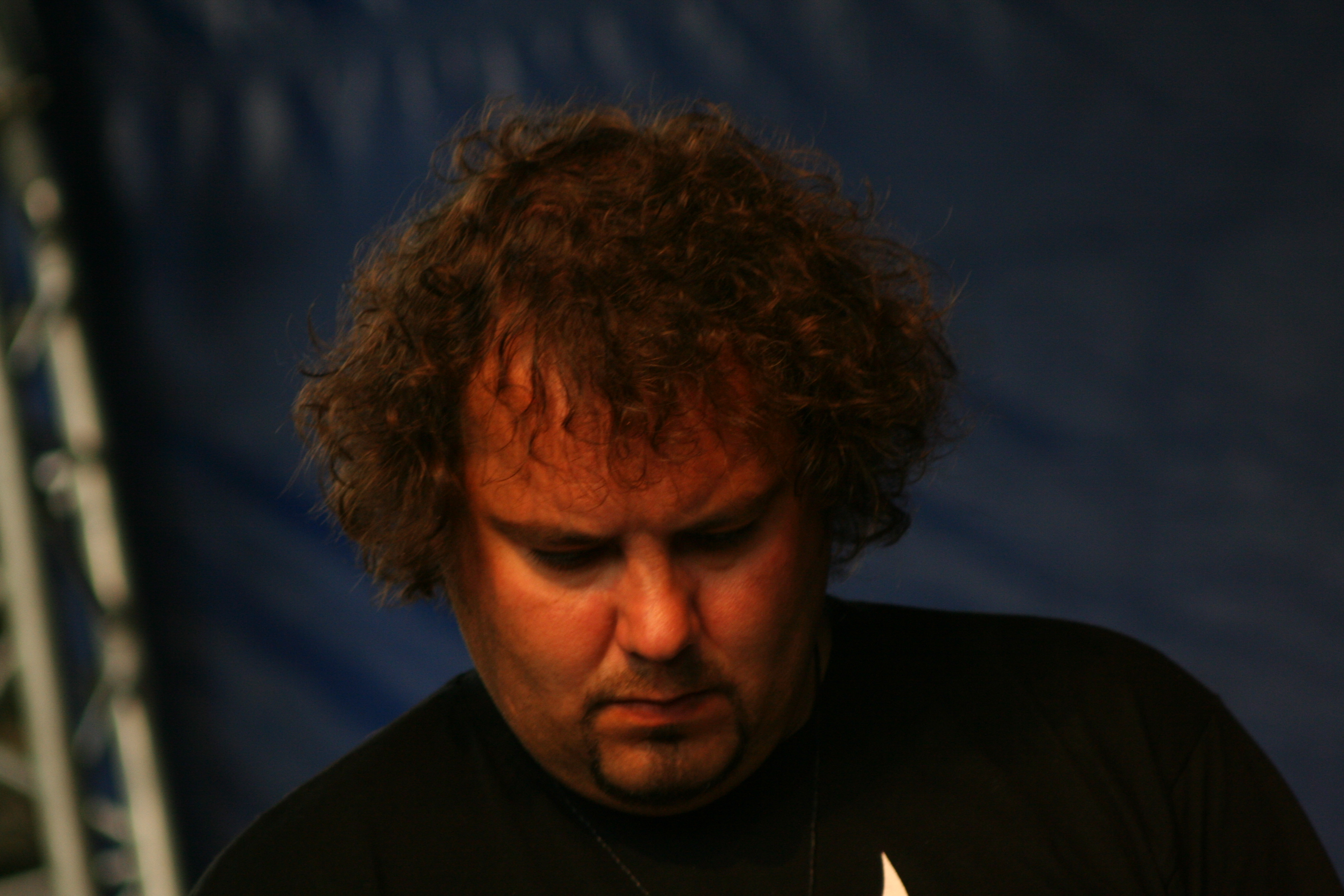
Burza, keyboards: 2005-2010

In July 2005, the band’s debut album Alarm!!! was released by the German–Austrian label Strobelight Records. The record received very positive reviews in music magazines and the specialist press, which helped the group gain wider recognition and led to concerts across Europe, including performances in Italy, France, Austria, the Czech Republic, Slovakia, Luxembourg, and Germany. That same year the band changed its keyboard player — Goozzolini left the group and was replaced by Burza. Around this time, Miguel and the Living Dead also appeared on several compilation albums, such as Gothic Magazine, New Dark Age Vol. 3, and Cold Zine.

In 2006, the band continued touring and performed in countries including the United Kingdom, Austria, and Germany. One of the most important live appearances of this period was certainly a very well-received show at the Wave Gotik Treffen Festival in Leipzig, in front of over 1000 people (alongside Clan Of Xymox, Combichrist, Dark Sanctuary, Deathstars, Decoded Feedback, Deine Lakaien, Feindflug, Katatonia, Lacrimosa, Nitzer Ebb, Samael, Theatre Of Tragedy, VNV Nation). In July the band also performed at the famous Polish rock music festival in Jarocin, where they received a special mention from the jury. Allegedly, the only obstacle to winning the award was that the group had lyrics only in English. Released in the same year German compilation New Dark Age vol.4 included a new song called "Lycantropia, which was a harbinger of the band's upcoming second album.

During the summer of 2007, Miguel and the Living Dead released their second studio album, Postcards From The Other Side, issued by the Polish independent label Noise Annoys. The record contained ten new songs that continued the musical direction established on their debut. Material from both Alarm!!! and the new album was later presented live at the well-known European gothic festival Castle Party 2007 in Bolków(along with such bands as The Legendary Pink Dots, Suicide Commando, Diary of Dreams, Front Line Assembly). The release received several favorable reviews in both underground publications and official music press.

=== Hiatus (2010-2017) and reunion (Since 2017) ===
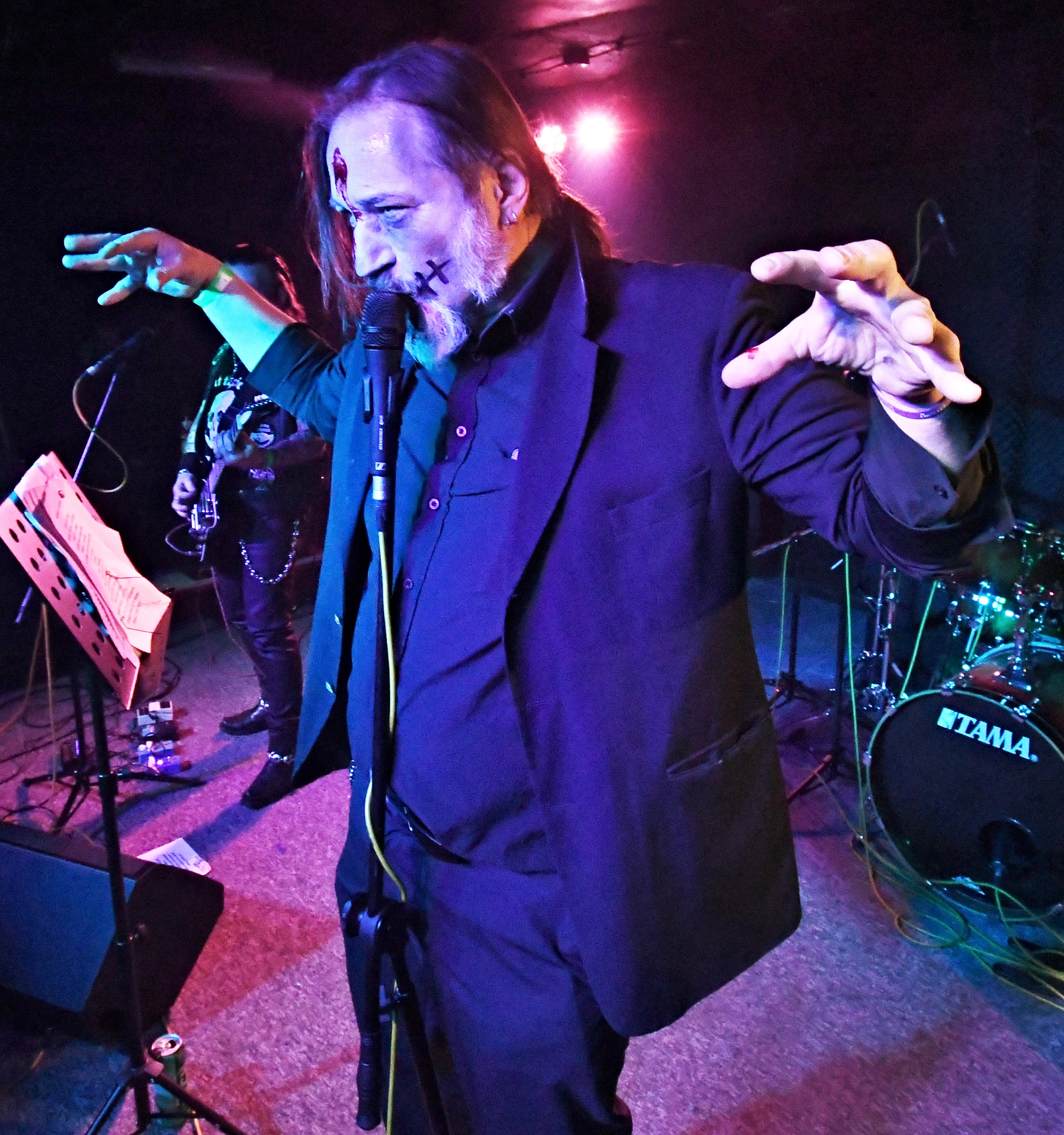
Slavik, lead vocal, 2022

In late summer 2007, the band’s founder Pete Vincent relocated permanently to the United Kingdom.

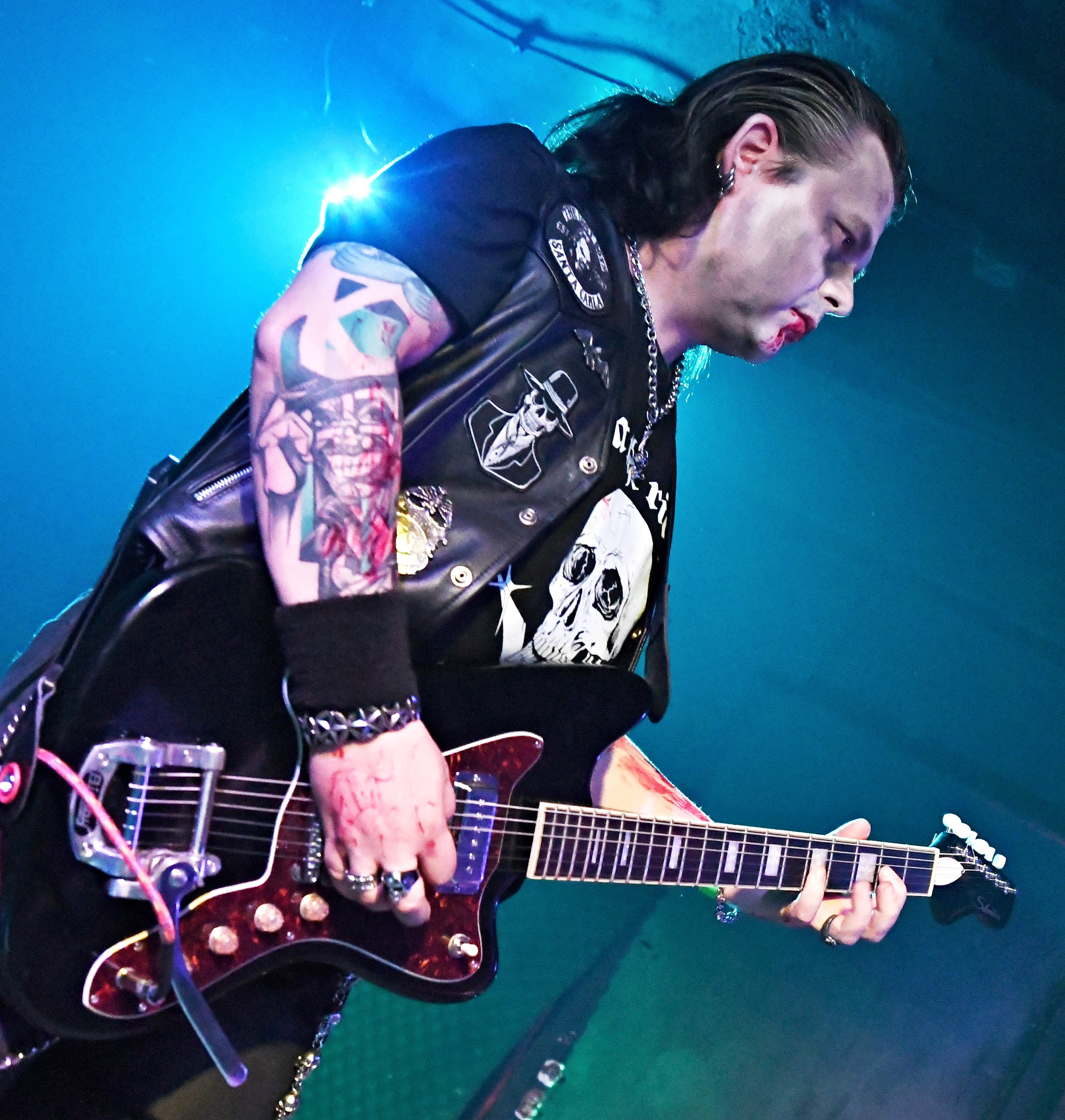
Pete Vincent, guitar and backing vocals, 2022

As a consequence, the group gradually reduced its activity and eventually entered a period of hiatus. Although they still played occasional shows in Poland and abroad, the band finally decided to end its activities in 2010 after a highly praised performance at the well-known goth and deathrock festival Drop Dead in Vilnius. Despite the split, all former members continued to stay active musically, performing and recording with various bands and projects, including Hatestory, Past, TZN Xenna, Wrony Na Śniegu, Miniskirt Blues, Devilish Presley, The Underrunners and several others.

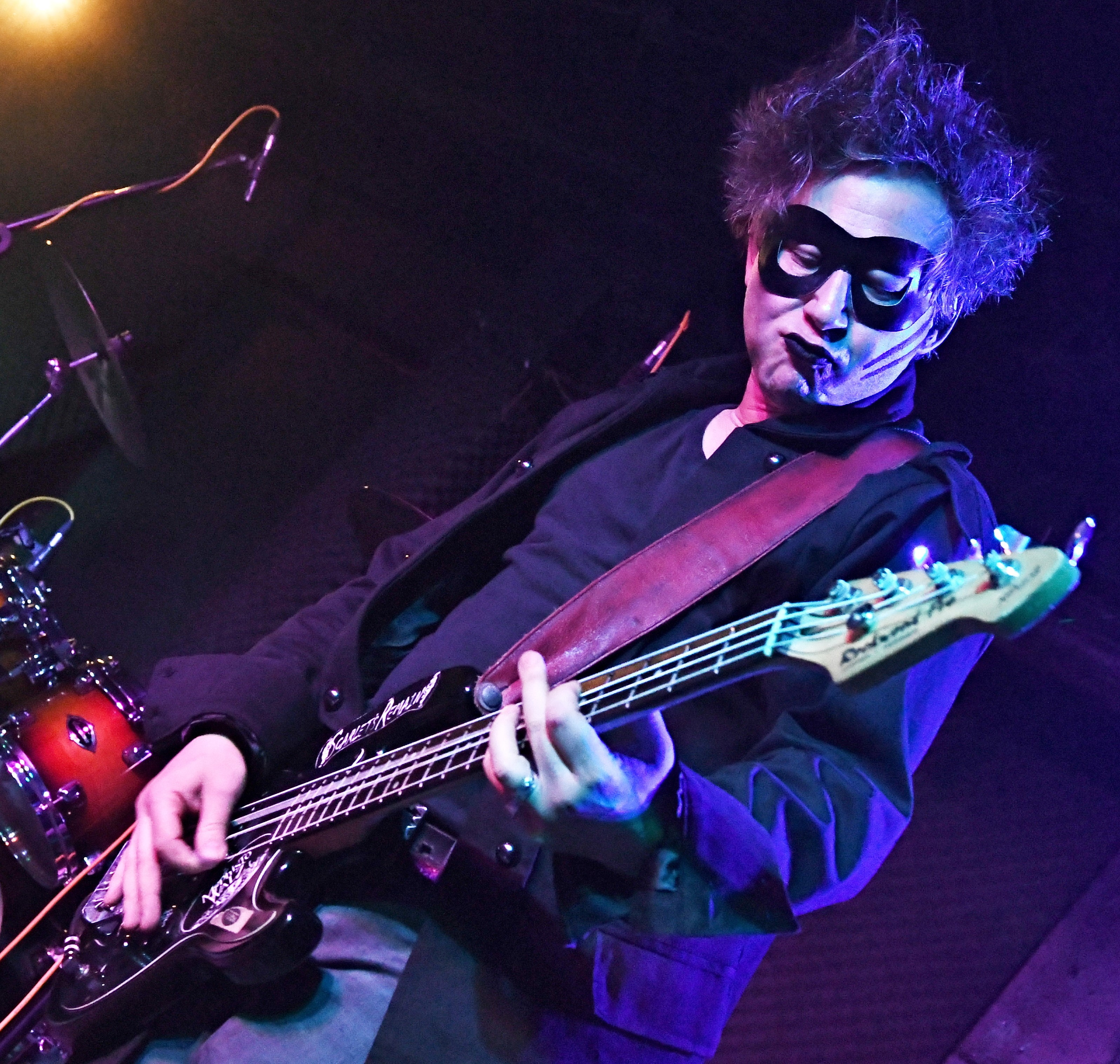
Klaus, bass guitar and backing vocals, 2022

The band returned in 2017 with a renewed line-up consisting of Slavik (vocals), Pete Vincent (guitar), Killer Klaus (bass), Staszek (drums; Syrbski Jeb, Hatestory), and Vins Vilaplana (keyboards; formerly of La Casa Usher). With Pete and Vins living in London—Vilaplana being of Spanish origin—the group effectively became an international project operating between two countries. The musicians began working on new material and preparing for their comeback.

In April 2019, Miguel and the Living Dead officially returned to the stage with a concert at the legendary Old Skull club in Warsaw, the same venue where they had played their first show back in 2004 (At that time (27 April 2019), MATLD featured Sindicato Vertical - a post-punk band from Alicante, Spain, and Kraft - a Warsaw-based musical project). Later that year, in October, they appeared at the Return to the Batcave festival in Wrocław, sharing the bill with internationally known acts such as Pink Turns Blue, Screaming Dead, Altar De Fey, Ötzi and Bootblacks.

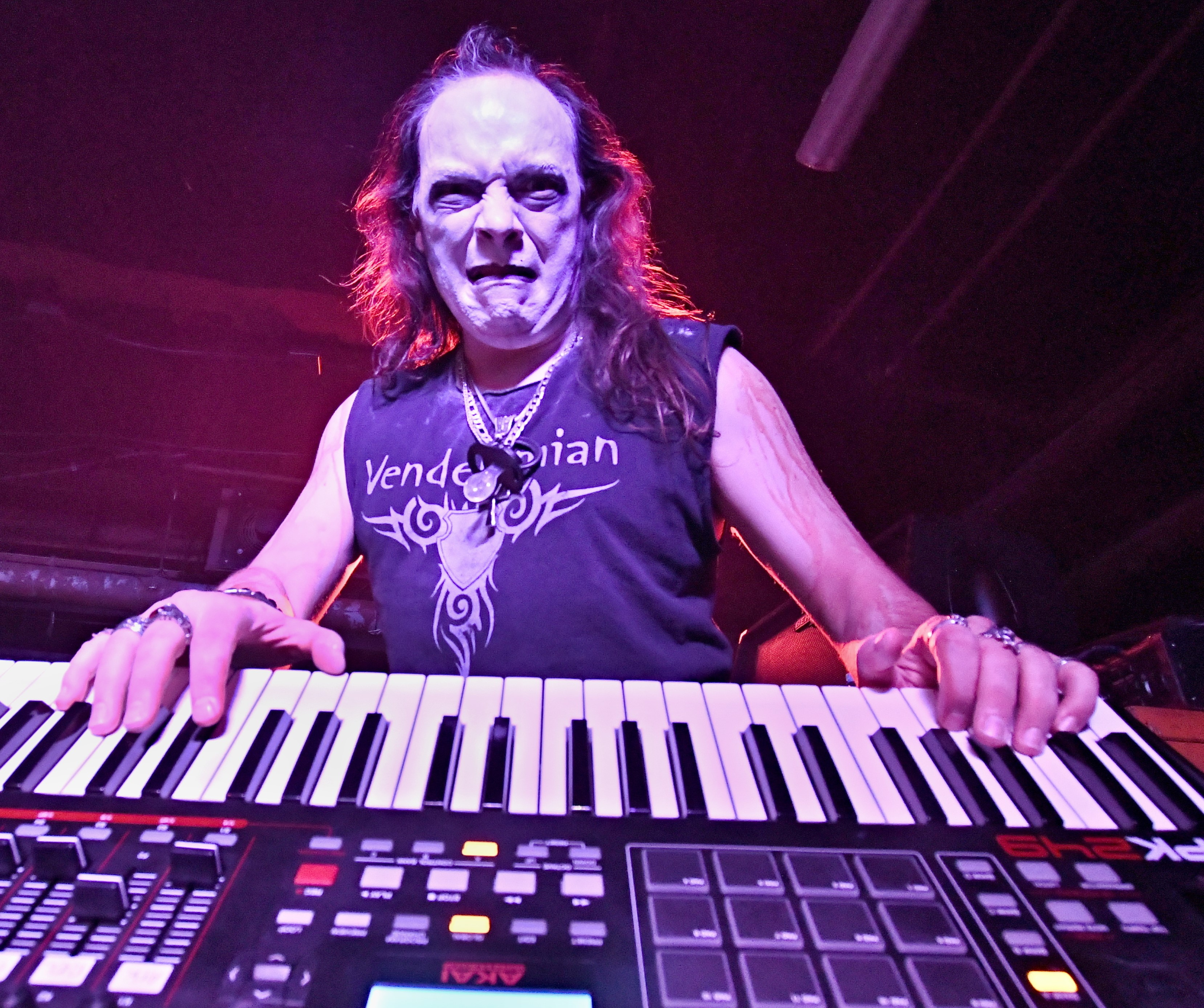
Vins, keyboards, 2017-present

Both concerts were warmly received by audiences and featured a mixture of classic songs from the band’s earlier period along with new material. In 2021, the debut album Alarm!!! was remastered and reissued on vinyl by the independent label Batcave Productions.

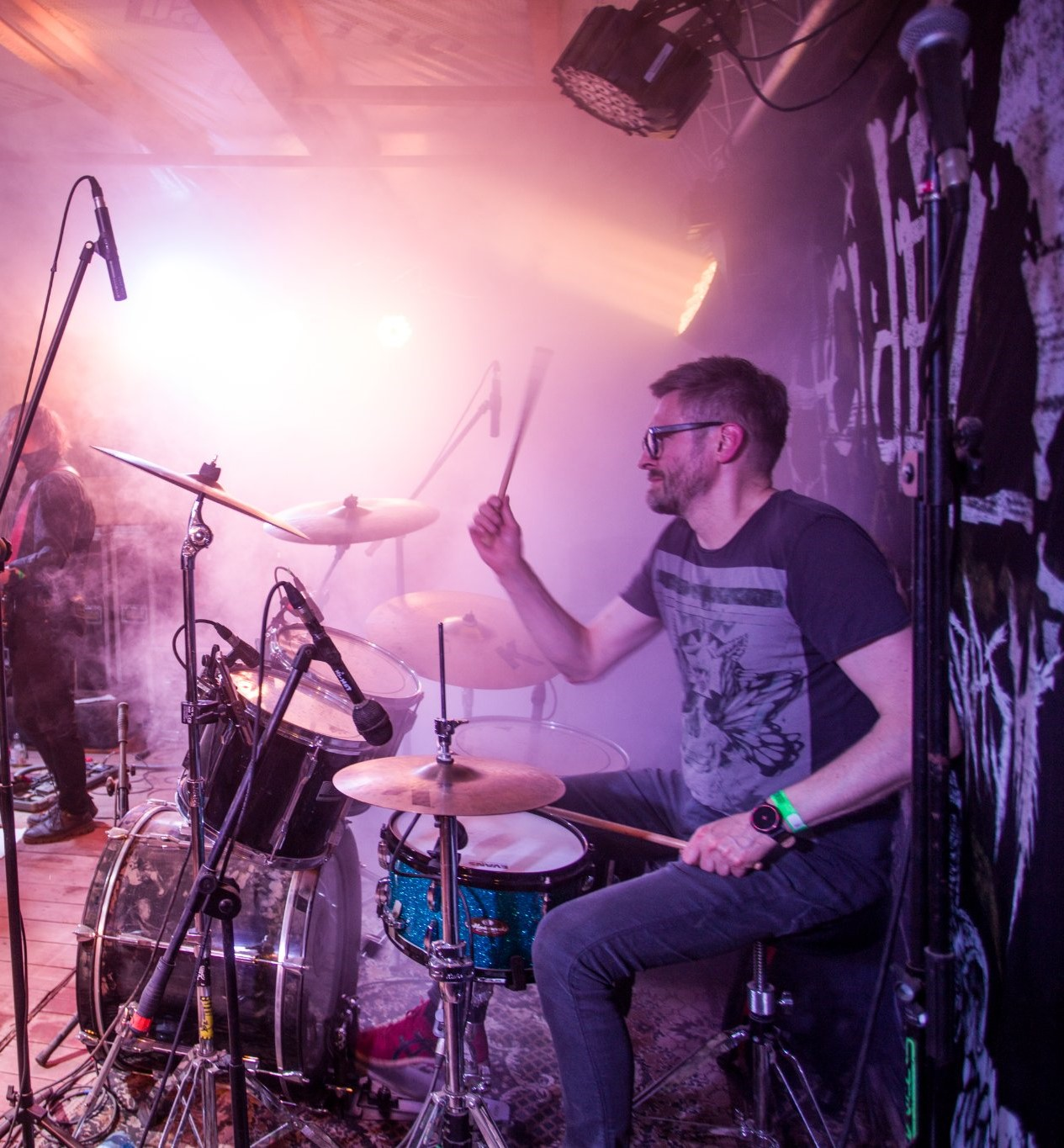
Stach Wysocki, drums: 2017 - 2024

Because of the COVID-19 pandemic, the group paused its activities during the lockdown period. They resumed performing in 2022, playing several concerts in Poland, including the Ultra Chaos Picnic Festival in Żelebsko and another appearance at the Castle Party Festival in Bolków alongside artists such as New Model Army, Sex Gang Children, She Past Away, Screaming Dead, XIII. Století, Lacuna Coil, Blutengel, Nitzer Ebb and Me And That Man.

In the autumn of 2022, the band began recording a new studio album, with the sessions being completed in the spring of 2023. In May of that year, they played their first international concert after the reunion at the well-known Gothic Pogo Festival in Leipzig, Germany.

In April 2024, Miguel and the Living Dead marked the 20th anniversary of their first live performance. To celebrate the occasion, they played during a special two-day edition of the Old Skull event held at the Hydrozagadka club in Warsaw. The celebration also coincided with the 20th anniversary of the Old Skull series itself. Other performers at the event included Section 25, Corpus Delicti, 1984, Wieże Fabryk and Ksy.

Later in 2024, the band underwent another line-up change when Don Dzwonson became the new drummer. He made his live debut with the group at the Return to the Batcave festival in Wrocław (October 3–5, 2024), performing a full set with the band. His next appearance took place on November 2, 2024, at the Potok club in Warsaw during a Halloween Party event.

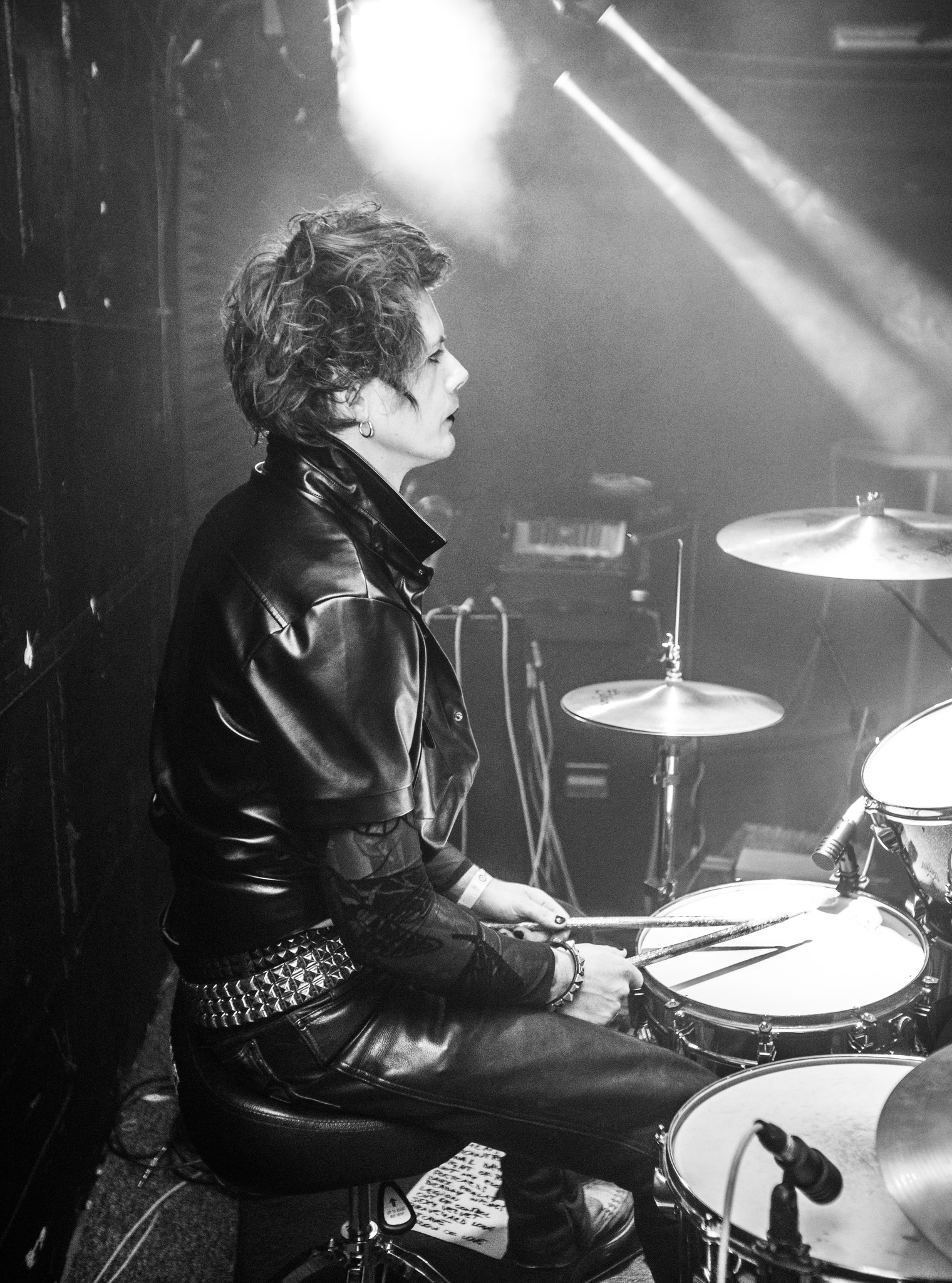
Don Dzwonson, drums: 2024 - present

On March 1, 2025, Miguel and the Living Dead performed in Mexico at the Tenochtitlán Oscura Fest. The concert attracted significant interest from Mexican fans, who had been waiting for the band to play there for many years. Miguel and the Living Dead performed alongside bands such as Bloody Dead and Sexy, Twisted Nerve, New Skeletal Faces, N:UN, Acid Bats, and Neolin.

=== Official return and Hyenaz! EP (2025–2026) ===
After nearly two decades without new releases, Miguel and the Living Dead returned in 2025 with the song “Hyenaz”, accompanied by a music video released on 31 May 2025. A second music video, for the song “Speaking in Smoke”, was released on 12 March 2026.

On 13 March 2026, the band released the four-track EP Hyenaz!, their first official release since their 2007 album. The EP was issued by the independent label Piranha Music. The mixing was handled by Marian Lech, who has also been involved in the production of albums by Polish artists such as Elektryczne Gitary, Artur Rojek, Krystyna Prońko, Hunter, Sarsa and Patrycja Markowska.

The official music video for "(I Am) The Outcast" was released on June 16, following its filming on March 13, 2026.

On August 14 of this year, the band performed in Rogoźnica at Batbeque / Chlewik Party 2026.

=== VII: This Is Not My Blood (2026–present) ===
On 13 November 2026, Miguel and the Living Dead released their third studio album, VII: This Is Not My Blood, once again through the Polish independent label Piranha Music. Featuring ten new tracks, the album was issued on CD, vinyl and digital platforms. The release was preceded by the single "Not My Blood", accompanied by a music video that premiered on 28 October 2026.

== Members ==
=== Current members ===
- Pete Vincent – guitar, keyboards, backing vocals (2001–present)
- Slavik – lead vocals (2003–present)
- Killer Klaus – bass guitar, backing vocals (2004–present)
- Vins Vilaplana – keyboards (2017–present)
- Don Dzwonson – drums (2024–present)

=== Past members ===
- Bartłomiej "Goozzolini" Guzowski– keyboards (2004–2005)
- Mariusz "Niuniek El Diablo" Markiewicz – drums (2004-2010)
- Krzysztof "Burza" Burzycki – keyboards (2005-2010)
- Stach Wysocki – drums (2017-2024)

== Discography ==
- Demo 2004 (2004)
- Alarm!!! (2005)
- Postcards From The Other Side (2007)
- Hyenaz! EP (2026)
- VII: This Is Not My Blood (2026)

== Music videos ==
- 2025: „Hyenaz”
- 2026: „Speaking In Smoke”
- 2026: „(I Am) The Outcast”
- 2026: „Not My Blood”
