= Frank the Baptist =

American alternative rock band

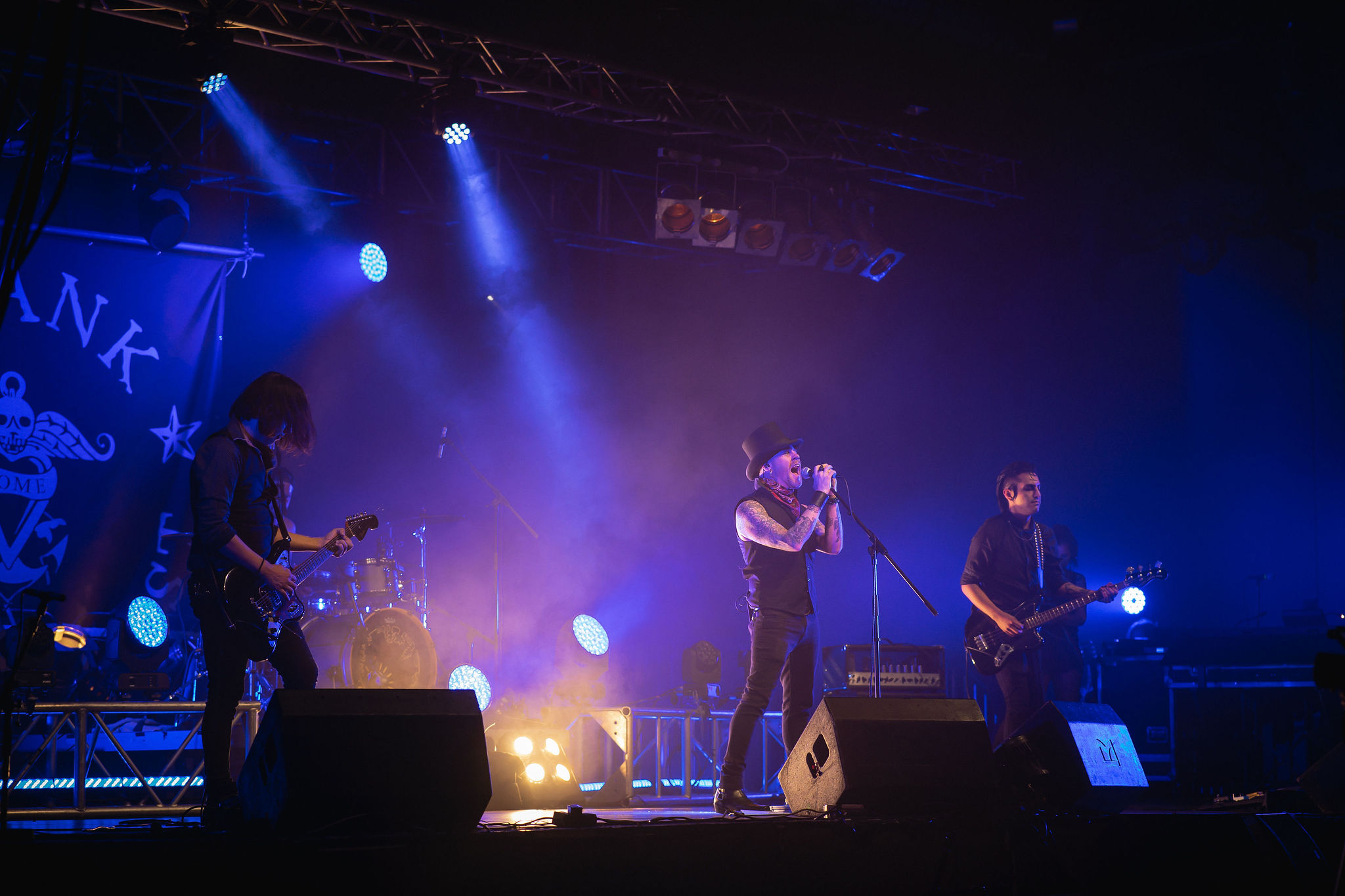
- Frank the Baptist performing in 2020

Background information
- Origin: San Diego, California, U.S.
- Label: Dark Dimensions
- Members: Frank Vollmann; Fez Wrecker; Lena Lonley; Stevie Nixx; Matteo Forgione
- Website: frankthebaptist.com

Frank the Baptist is an American alternative rock band founded in San Diego, California, by frontman Frank Vollmann, based in Berlin, Germany since 2006.

== History ==
Strobelight Records was founded to release their first album, Different Degrees of Empty, in 2003. In 2004, the band toured Europe for the first time to support their second album, Beggars Would Ride. The band played at the Wave-Gotik-Treffen music festival in May 2005.

Frank Vollmann relocated to Berlin in 2006, joining long-time comrades Fez Wrecker (Bonniwell Music Machine, The Fuzztones) and Benn Ra (Hatesex, ex-Diva Destruction), both of whom had coincidentally played in early incarnations of Frank the Baptist in San Diego in 1997–1998. East Berliner Phantomas joined on drums, and the new line-up of the Berlin Chapter debuted at The Villa in Leipzig on Friday 13, 2006.

In November 2006, the band went into Studio Wong in Berlin-Kreuzberg and recorded the band's 3rd album, The New Colossus.

From 2006 to 2009, the band maintained a headquarters of sorts at a bar run by Frank and Fez, called "The Speakeasy Berlin".

From 2009 to 2014, the band went through various periods of touring and festival appearances, and lineup changes. In 2015, they self-released their 4th album As the Camp Burns as the long-awaited follow up to the critically successful New Colossus. 2019 saw the group join Dark Dimensions label, and released their 5th album Road Omen.

In 2021, guitarist and fellow San Diegan Fez Wrecker rejoined the group as second guitarist, marking the beginning of the FTB 5-person lineup. After recruiting bassist Stevie Nixx and drummer Matteo Forgione, the group supported Me and That Man on a Northern European tour in the Spring of 2024—with early FTB alumnus Scotty 'Thunders' Evans rounding out the lineup on second guitar.

In 2025, the band teamed up again with Andi Bukelini and Studio Wong in Berlin, with whom they recorded The New Colossus in 2006, and the long-awaited 6th album is due for release in 2026.

== Current members ==
- Frank Vollmann – vocals
- Fez Wrecker – guitars
- Stevie Nixx – bass
- Lena Lonley – guitars
- Matteo Forgione - drums

Past members

- Gerrit Hassler – guitars
- Ralf Huenefeld - guitars
- Salo Bosse – drums
- Julio Cardador - bass
- Benn Ra – bass
- Thomas Fietz – drums
- Justin Stephens – bass
- Mario Usai (Clan of Xymox) – bass
- Carsten Klatte (Project Pitchfork, Peter Hepner)
- Ilija Gavrilenko – bass
- Scot "The Hoople" Evans – guitar
- Barry "The Dead" Perzan – bass
- Eric "E-train" Schlosser – bass
- "Camp" Dave Hamersma – drums
- Thomas Fuhr – guitar
- Rob Podzunas – bass
- Wood – bass
- Anthony De La Cruz – keyboards

== Discography ==
- Different Degrees of Empty (2003)
- Beggars Would Ride (2004)
- The New Colossus (2007)
- As the Camp Burns (2015)
- Road Omen (2019)
