= Blendwerk Antikunst (EP) =

Blendwerk Antikunst EP

EP by Stillste Stund
- Released: (Germany) 2006
- Recorded: Schallschmiede Würzberg, Germany
- Genre: electronic music, cantastoria
- Length: 24:09
- Producer: Oliver Uckermann

The Blendwerk Antikunst EP of Stillste Stund is an EP that was given out for promotional purpose.
It contains several remixes of album tracks from the album Blendwerk Antikunst.

== Track listing ==
1. "Untertage (Abraum Version)"- 4:55
2. "Kein Mittel gegen dieses Gift (Antigift Version)"- 4:38
3. "Die Teufelsbuhle (666 Version)"- 4:52
4. "Blendwerk Antikunst (Blender & Motten Version)"- 4:48
5. "Apocalyptic Noon (Dawn Version)"- 4:54
