= Von Rosen und Neurosen – Eine erlesene Sammlung grausamster Albträume =

Von Rosen und Neurosen - Eine erlesene Sammlung grausamster Albträume

Studio album by Stillste Stund
- Released: March 14, 2008 (Germany)
- Recorded: Schallschmiede Würzberg, Germany
- Genre: darkwave, electronic music, cantastoria
- Length: 1:09:12; 42:02 (bonus disc); 1:51:14 (both discs)
- Label: Alice In... (Germany)
- Producer: Oliver Uckermann

Stillste Stund chronology
Blendwerk Antikunst (2005)	Von Rosen und Neurosen - Eine erlesene Sammlung grausamster Albträume (2008)

Von Rosen und Neurosen – Eine erlesene Sammlung grausamster Albträume is the fifth studio album by Stillste Stund. The album was additionally released with a bonus disc.

== Track listing ==
All tracks are written by Oliver Uckermann.

No.	Title	Length
1.	"Käfigseele"	5:20
2.	"Viktor (Von Rosen und Nekrosen)"	5:06
3.	"Alice III (Schwesterherz)"	5:19
4.	"Tiefenritt"	5:14
5.	"Kammerspiel"	6:43
6.	"Sternenwacht"	5:48
7.	"Speichel, Laub & Saitenspiel"	7:45
8.	"Heidnisch Barbastella"	5:41
9.	"Marsch in Unschärfe Verlorener"	5:50
10.	"Die Hure Babylon"	6:03
11.	"Der Galaktische Zoo"	4:56
12.	"Licht frisst Stille, Schwarz frisst Licht"	5:24
Total length:		69:12

=== Bonus Disc: Alice EP - Projektionen, Reflexionen, Variationen ===
All tracks are written by Oliver Uckermann.

No.	Title	Length
1.	"Multiple Spiegelwelt (Prolog)"	2:18
2.	"Alice (Der Spiegeltanz) - remastered"	5:56
3.	"Dissoziatives Wunderland (Zwischenspiel I)"	2:03
4.	"Alice II (Nie allein mit dir) - ungekürzte Version"	7:11
5.	"Diffuse Leibhaft (Zwischenspiel II)"	1:07
6.	"Alice III (Schwesterherz) - ungekürzte Version"	6:08
7.	"Präfinales Schattenwerk (Epilogue)"	2:58
8.	"Letzte Führung"	1:55
9.	"Nekrolog A. (Lesung)"	8:13
10.	"Alice III (Das Ich-Remix)"	4:10
Total length:		42:02

== Info ==
- Oliver Uckermann – music, lyrics, acoustic, electronic instruments, programming, production, and vocals
- Birgit Strunz – vocals
- Birgit Strunz – vocals (tracks 1–4, 6, 8, 11)
- Birgit Strunz – artwork and photography
