= Alice In... =

German record label

- Founded: 1992
- Founder: Frank D'Angelo
- Distributor: Nova Media Distribution
- Genre: Gothic rock, darkwave, industrial, EBM
- Country of origin: Germany
- Location: Hesse
- Official website: darkdimensions.de

Alice In... is an indie industrial-oriented record label based in Hesse, Germany.

== History ==
Alice In... was founded in the early 1990s by Frank D'Angelo. Its first signings were in 1995 with the bands The Hall of Souls, Misantrophe, No Critics, and Babylon Will Fall. Parallel to the publications of German Newcomer, Alice In... had made a narrow collaboration with English record labels, like Resurrection Records and Grave News. Inkubus Sukkubus, Sensorium, and This Burning Effigy, among others were also signed to Alice In... The first official Alice In... release, was No Critics' Prayers Behind the Door. Then, the label released Misantrophe's "Der Tod zerfraß die Kindlichkeit".

Alice In..., as well as Schwarzrock, Scanner and ProNoize, are sub-labels of Dark Dimensions label group.

Later releases include work by Stillste Stund and by Bloody Dead and Sexy.

In 1997, the label signed a distribution deal with Nova Media Distribution.

== Notable artists (past and present) ==
- Bloody Dead and Sexy
- Corpus Delicti
- Diva Destruction
- Empyrean
- Hatesex
- Inkubus Sukkubus
- Kiss The Blade
- Mephisto Walz
- Mondsucht
- Monica Richards
- Nekromantik
- Relatives Menschsein
- Sensorium
- Shadow Project
- Stillste Stund
- Sunshine Blind
- Suspiria
- The Last Days of Jesus

== See also ==
- Category:Alice In... albums
- List of record labels
