= Ursprung Paradoxon =

Studio album by Stillste Stund
- Released: October 22, 2001 (Germany)
- Recorded: Schallschmiede Würzberg, Germany
- Genre: Electronic, cantastoria, gothic rock, dark wave, industrial, new wave, neoclassical dark wave, spoken word, theatrical, experimental
- Length: 68:09
- Label: Alice In... (Germany)
- Producer: Oliver Uckermann

Stillste Stund chronology
Ein Mensch, ein Ding, ein Traum (2000)	Ursprung Paradoxon (2001)	Biestblut - Zwei in Einem (Ein Gedankenkonstrukt in sieben Szenen) (2003)

Professional ratings
Review scores
Source	Rating
Discogs	5/5 stars
Amazon.de	5/5 stars

Ursprung Paradoxon is the 2nd album of German music group Stillste Stund.

== Track listing ==
1. "Gambit" – 4:39
2. "Mühle Mahlt" – 6:15
3. "Grotesk" – 4:36
4. "Wir sind Energie" – 5:15
5. "Nexus" – 4:32
6. "Alice (Der Spiegeltanz)" – 5:50
7. "Ebenholz, Schnee & Blut" – 5:11
8. "Leben ist nur ein Traum" – 6:07
9. "Unter Kreuzen" – 6:10
10. "An das Morgenlicht" – 7:51
11. "Ursprung Paradoxon" – 7:09
12. "Die Macht der Stille" – 3:53

== Info ==
- All tracks arranged, recorded, mixed, written and produced by Oliver Uckermann
- Lyrics on track 9 written by Oliver Uckermann & Birgit Strunz
- Male vocals by Oliver Uckermann
- Female vocals on tracks 1, 3, 4, 6, 7 and 9 by Birgit Strunz
- Female vocals on track 2 by Inanis Kurzweil
- Female vocals on track 8 by Birgit Strunz & Inanis Kurzweil
- Album artwork and sleeve design by Birgit Strunz
