= Javůrek (surname) =

Javůrek (feminine: Javůrková) is a Czech surname. It is a diminutive of javor, i.e. 'maple'. Slovak equivalent is Javorek. Notable people with the surname include:

- Josef Javůrek (1876–1942), Czech fencer
- Karel Javůrek (1815–1909), Czech painter
- Petr Javůrek (born 1968), Czech table tennis player

== See also ==
- Jabůrek
