= Willkommen im Jenseits =

Studio album by Mondsucht
- Released: January 31, 2000
- Recorded: Audiodrom Mannheim, Germany
- Genre: Electronic music, goth rock, darkwave
- Length: 42:11
- Label: Alice In...
- Producer: Mondsucht

Mondsucht chronology
Willkommen im Jenseits (2000)	Für die Nacht gemacht (2002)

Willkommen im Jenseits is the first full-length album of the German band Mondsucht.

== Track listing ==
All songs written and produced by Mondsucht.

1. "Eiskalter Engel" – 4:54
2. "Bittersüßer Tod" – 4:37
3. "Der Totentanz" – 4:45
4. "Das Versprechen" – 4:12
5. "Dunkle Seelen" – 4:40
6. "Das Jenseits" – 2:43
7. "Die Stadt" – 4:12
8. "Verlies der Ewigkeit" – 4:28
9. "Ohne Dich" – 5:00
10. "Zahnloser Vampir" – 4:00

== Personnel ==
- Robert N. – vocals
- Astrid M. – vocals
