= Run Cold =

Studio album by Diva Destruction
- Released: September 25, 2006
- Genre: Electronic music; gothic rock; darkwave; industrial
- Length: 48:22
- Label: Alice In... (Germany)
- Producer: Debra Fogarty

Diva Destruction chronology
Exposing the Sickness (2003)	Run Cold (2006)

Run Cold is the third full-length album from Diva Destruction.

The album was rated 3.5 out of 5 stars by AllMusic.

== Track listing ==
1. "Run Cold"– 4:17
2. "Rewriting History"– 4:43
3. "The 4th Knife"– 3:56
4. "Electric Air"– 4:06
5. "Escape"– 4:44
6. "Subterfuge"– 4:23
7. "Screaming Inside"– 4:39
8. "Illusion's End"– 4:31
9. "Kiss The Stars"– 4:06
10. "Safe With Me"– 4:29
11. "Resolution"– 3:47

== Info ==
- All tracks written, performed, recorded, mixed, and produced by Debra Fogarty.
