= Biestblut – Zwei in Einem (Ein Gedankenkonstrukt in sieben Szenen) =

Biestblut - zwei in einem (Ein Gedankenkonstrukt in sieben Szenen)

Studio album by Stillste Stund
- Released: November 17, 2003 (Germany)
- Recorded: Schallschmiede Würzberg, Germany
- Genre: Electronic, cantastoria, gothic rock, dark wave, industrial, new wave, neoclassical dark wave, theatrical, experimental
- Length: 77:00
- Label: Alice In... (Germany)
- Producer: Oliver Uckermann

Stillste Stund chronology
Ursprung Paradoxon (2001)	Biestblut - zwei in einem (Ein Gedankenkonstrukt in sieben Szenen) (2003)	Blendwerk Antikunst (2005)

Professional ratings
Review scores
Source	Rating
Discogs	link
Amazon.de	link

Biestblut - zwei in einem (Ein Gedankenkonstrukt in sieben Szenen) (German: Beast Blood-Two in One; A Thought Construct in Seven Scenes) is the third album by Stillste Stund.

== Track listing ==
1. Prolog "Geist-Dämmerung" - 3:02
2. Szene 1: Prokreation & Geburt "Vorahnung" - 2:34
3. Szene 1: Prokreation & Geburt "Erwachen in der Kälte" – 3:00
4. Szene 1: Prokreation & Geburt "Weltwinternacht" – 4:44
5. Szene 2: Das Vermächtnis "Treibjagd" – 2:08
6. Szene 2: Das Vermächtnis "Fraß oder Fresser" – 3:48
7. Szene 2: Das Vermächtnis "Darwin" – 4:58
8. Szene 3: Die Wölfe "Gleich dem Ende der Welt" – 2:16
9. Szene 3: Die Wölfe "Alphawolf" – 2:42
10. Szene 3: Die Wölfe "Sublunaris" – 4:18
11. Szene 4: Die Elfen "Tellereisen" – 1:54
12. Szene 4: Die Elfen "Spottgesang einer Elfe" – 2:45
13. Szene 4: Die Elfen "Wo die Wirklichkeit schweigt" – 6:08
14. Szene 5: Der Schläfer "Für die Ewigkeit eines Lidschlags" – 2:52
15. Szene 5: Der Schläfer "Galerie der Träume" – 2:32
16. Szene 5: Der Schläfer "Nebelland" – 4:49
17. Szene 6: Das Gott-Kalkül "Geliebt" – 1:29
18. Szene 6: Das Gott-Kalkül "Zweites Erwachen" – 2:55
19. Szene 6: Das Gott-Kalkül "Golem" – 5:00
20. Szene 7: Reminiszenz & Tod "Entleibung" – 1:40
21. Szene 7: Reminiszenz & Tod "Auflösung und Erlösung" – 2:42
22. Szene 7: Reminiszenz & Tod "Solar Plexus" – 5:36
23. Epilog "Der Gedanke eines anderen" – 2:25

== Info ==
- All songs written by Oliver Uckermann, except tracks 7 and 16: lyrics by Birgit Strunz and Oliver Uckermann
- Arranged, produced, record and mixed by Oliver Uckermann
- Male vocals by Oliver Uckermann
- Female vocals on tracks 4, 7, 10, 13, 16 and 22 by Birgit Strunz
- Additional female vocals by Inanis Kurzweil
- Photography by Norbert Strunz
- Album artwork by Birgit Strunz
