= Sylphes =

Studio album by Corpus Delicti
- Released: 1994
- Genre: Gothic rock
- Length: 52:35
- Label: Glasnost Records

Corpus Delicti chronology
Twilight (1993)	Sylphes (1994)	Obsessions (1995)

Sylphes is the second album by gothic rock band Corpus Delicti, released in 1994. It was reedited in 2008 under the name A New Sarabande of Sylphes.

== Track listing ==
No.	Title	Length
1.	"Patient"	1:41
2.	"The Lake"	2:59
3.	"...Of All Desperations"	4:09
4.	"Saraband"	5:29
5.	"Noxious (The Demon's Game)"	6:15
6.	"The Smile of Grace"	3:53
7.	"Circle"	2:45
8.	"Dusk of Hallows"	4:09
9.	"Red"	3:28
10.	"Private Slaughter"	1:11
11.	"The Awakening"	8:03
12.	"Sylphes"	4:28
