= Für die Nacht gemacht =

Album by Mondsucht

Studio album by Mondsucht
- Released: (Germany) April 15, 2002
- Genre: electronic music Gothic music Darkwave; Industrial
- Length: 46:50
- Label: Alice In... (Germany)
- Producer: Mondsucht

Mondsucht chronology
Für die Nacht gemacht (2002)	Allein unter Schatten (2004)

Professional ratings
Review scores
Source	Rating
Rockezine	link

Für die Nacht gemacht is the second full-length album of Mondsucht.

== Track listing ==
1. "Abenddämmerung"– 2:45
2. "Tiefenstille"– 4:10
3. "Zwei Wege"– 4:13
4. "Schwarzes Herz"– 4:23
5. "Die Zeit"– 4:15
6. "Keine Träume"– 3:32
7. "Mitten in der Nacht"– 4:14
8. "Zeig mir Dein Gesicht"– 3:53
9. "Alles für Dich"– 4:40
10. "Nachtfalter"- 4:45
11. "Morgengrauen"– 5:53

== Info ==
- All tracks written and produced by Mondsucht
- Male vocals by Robert N.
- Female vocals by Astrid M.
