= Cannoneer Jabůrek =

1884 song

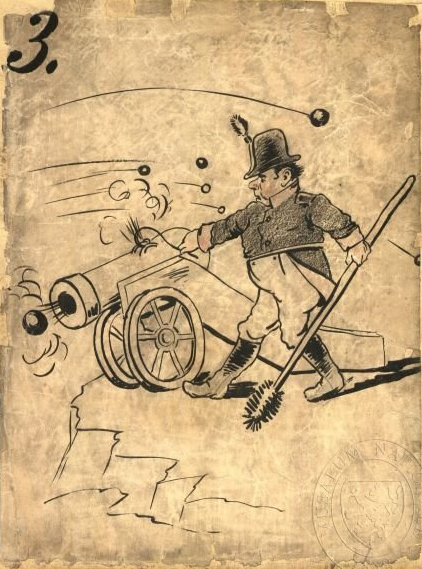
Kanonýr Jabůrek by František Kolár

Cannoneer Jabůrek (Czech: Kanonýr Jabůrek), published in 1884, is a cantastoria that mocks war propaganda that often made up stories about military heroism. It is one of the most popular parodies of kramářská píseň, the Czech form of cantastoria.

== The song ==
The song is a story of a valiant cannoneer Jabůrek who, as the song says, took part in the Battle of Königgrätz (1866). Even after the enemy's cannonballs tore off both his arms, he continued to load his cannon with bare feet, etc. When his head was torn off, it flew to the general and said: "Reporting, I cannot give a salute." The song further says that for his valiance he was promoted into nobility to be named Edler von den Jabůrek, and that he had no head, no big deal, because there was plenty of headless nobility already. No real event is described in the song; however, at the times there were newspaper reports and legends describing various kinds of exaggerated heroism.

1. Tam u Královýho Hradce, lítaly tam koule prudce
z kanónů a flintiček do ubohých lidiček.

R: A u kanónu stál a pořád ládo-, ládo-, ládo-,
u kanónu stál a furt jen ládoval.

2. Kmáni, šarže, oficíři, kobyly i kanonýři
po zemí se válejí, rány je moc pálejí.

R: A u kanónu stál...

There is a Ukrainian language variant sung by Ukrainian Sich Riflemen, a Ukrainian unit within the Austro-Hungarian Army during the First World War, titled "При каноні стояв" ("He Stood by a Cannon"). The overall idea is the same, but the text is rather different:

При каноні стояв
І фурт-фурт ладував,
І фурт-фурт, і фурт-фурт,
І фурт-фурт ладував.
Гостра куля летіла
Йому руку відтяла.
Але він все стояв
І фурт-фурт ладував.
<etc.>

== In culture ==
=== Czech ===
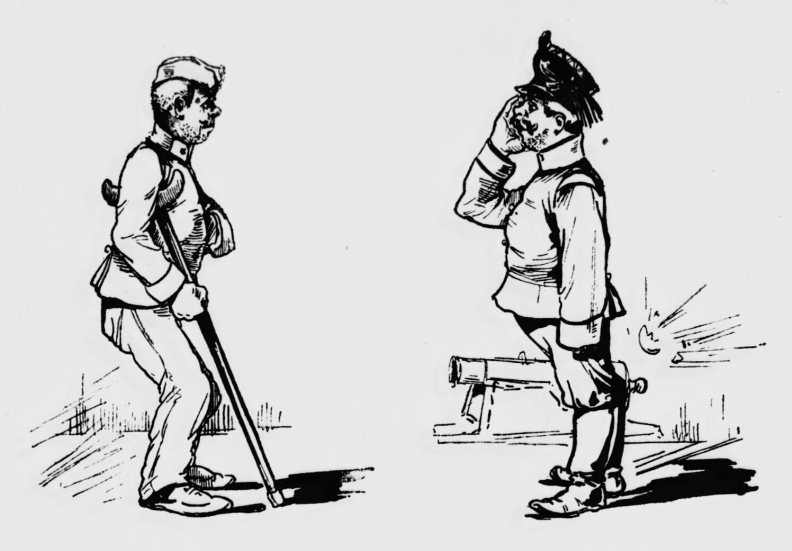
Jabůrek and Kalina (1895)

There was a comic duetto "Stará vojna" featuring two fictional military invalids: Cannoneer Jabůrek and Private Kalina, music by Josef Paukner, lyrics by Josef Šváb.

The song about Jabůrek is performed in the book The Good Soldier Švejk by a duet of Švejk and Volunteer Marek in a military prison cell. Somewhat later Marek starts inventing similar military feats about heroism of their military comrades. For example, with head torn off, the body shoots down an enemy plane.

The brave cannoneer is in the center of the plot of a 1986 satirical "historical fiction radio play" Jaburek by Austrian playwright Franz Hiesel.

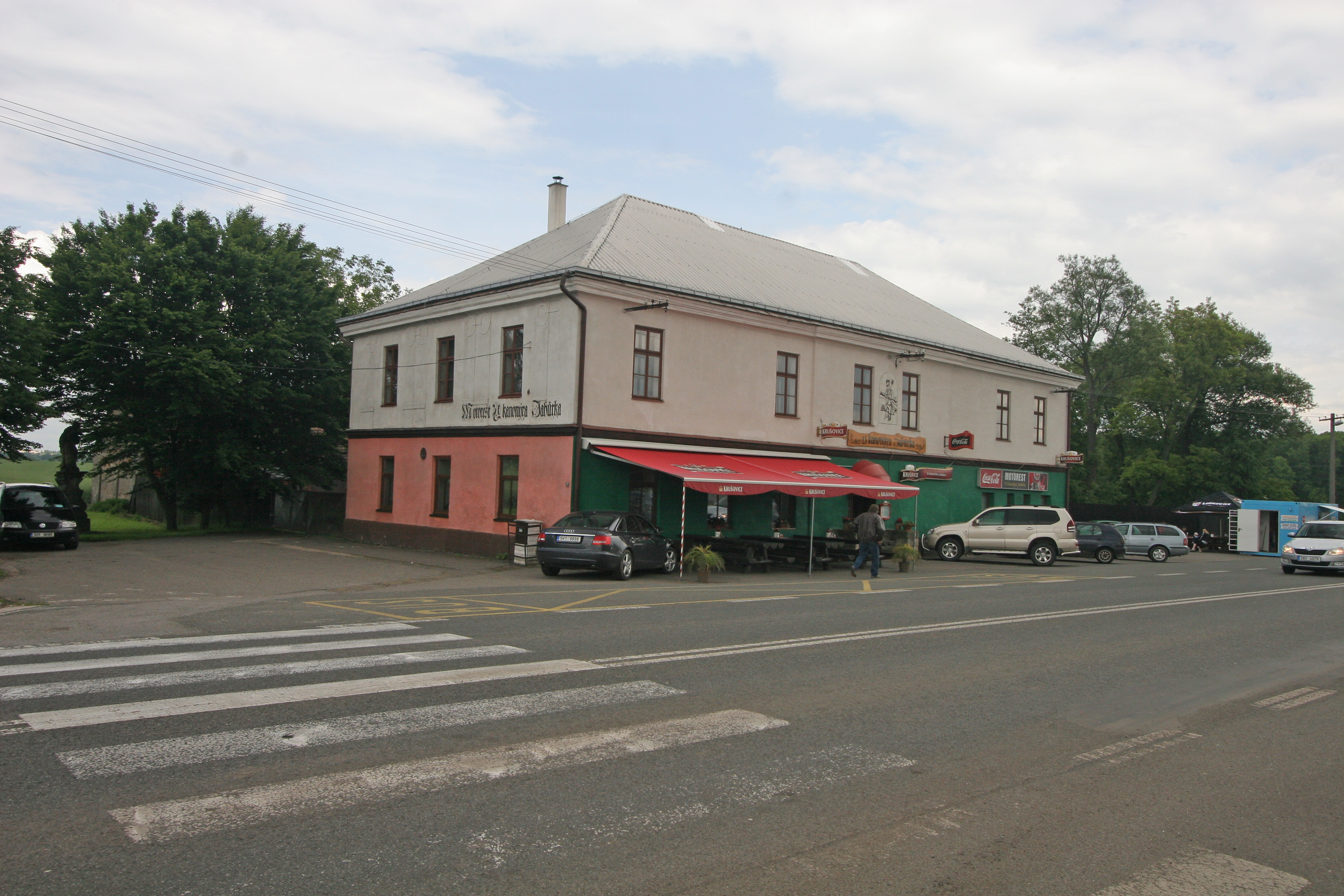
U Kanonýra Jabůrka

There is a tavern U Kanonýra Jabůrka in Sadová, a place around which the battle was held.

In 1968 Rudolf Pellar recorded a single, Králové Hradecké Zvony / Kanonýr Jabůrek.

In 1985 the Czech folk band Kantoři recorded the song with Supraphon in the LP album Tam u Královýho Hradce.

In 2022 Czech Television produced an episode U kanónu stál in series Folklorika.

=== Ukrainian ===
The fragments of the Ukrainian version of the song are quoted in the epic novel Shruba (Шруба) by Yaroclav Vereshchak as the skeleton of the plot.

The song is performed in the 1990 film Tall Tales about Ivan (Небилиці про Івана) directed by Borys Ivchenko.

The song has been performed by a number of Ukrainian bands, see the Ukrainian version of the article.

== See also ==
- List of anti-war songs
- Javůrek
