= Syn:Drom =

Studio album by Corpus
- Released: 1998
- Genre: Industrial
- Label: Season of Mist

Corpus chronology
The Best of Corpus Delicti (1996)	Syn:Drom (1998)

Syn:Drom is the only album released by Corpus Delicti after changing their name to Corpus. The name change reflects the drastic change in sound, from their previous gothic rock to industrial.

== Track listing ==
1. "Plug"
2. "Diamonds"
3. "Syn:Drom"
4. "Satellites"
5. "Train 147"
6. "b?d?itch"
7. "Lift Off"
8. "Oneself"
9. "Fear as Reject"
10. "All Wrong"
11. "Horses are Green and Purple"
12. "Season (Fifth and Last)"
