= Inkubus Sukkubus =

British goth and pagan band

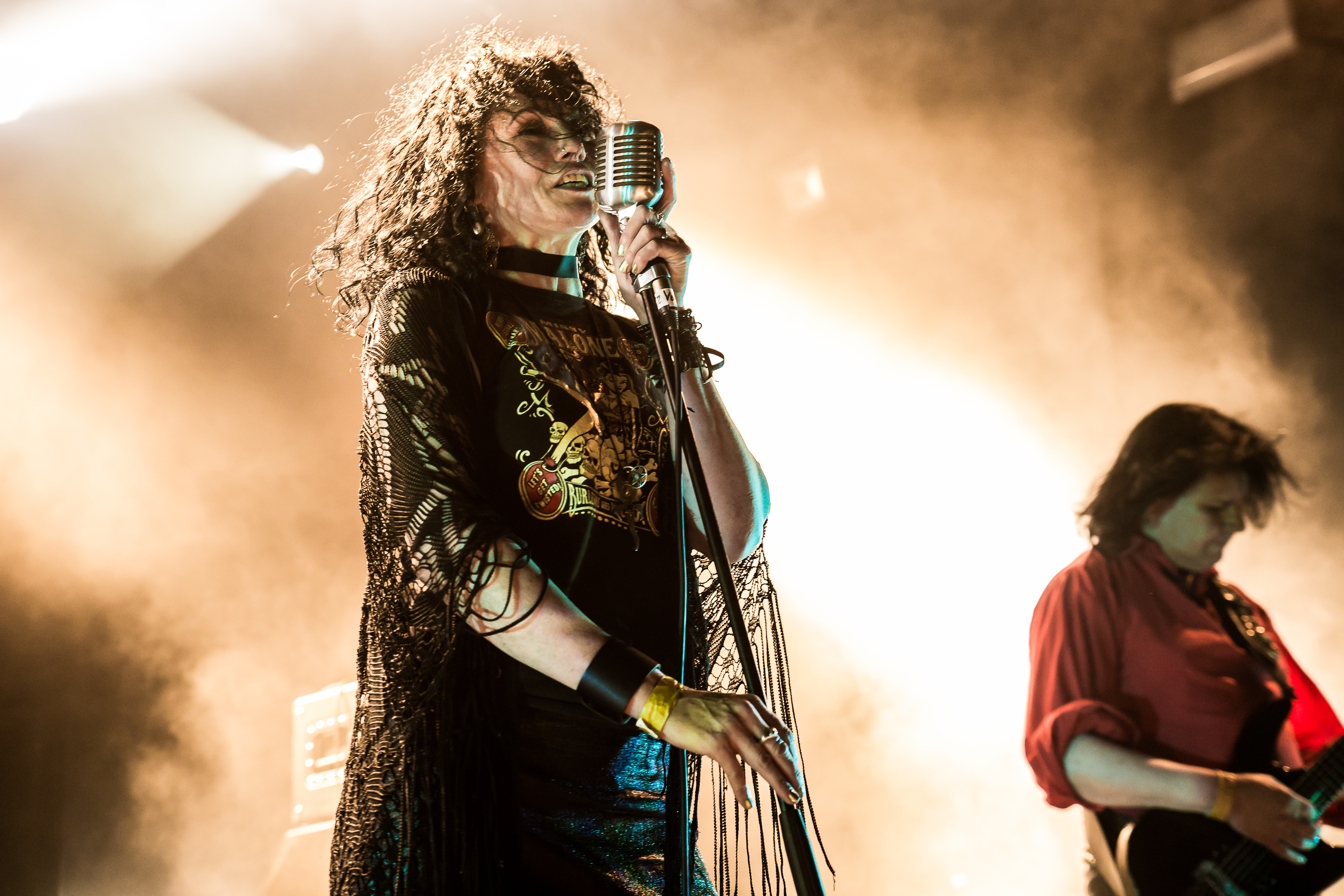
- Candia Ridley of Inkubus Sukkubus at Wave-Gotik-Treffen (2019)

Background information
- Origin: Cheltenham, Gloucestershire, England
- Genres: Gothic rock; pagan rock
- Years active: 1989–present
- Labels: Resurrection Records; Cleopatra Records; Alice In...
- Members: Candia Ridley; Tony McKormack; Roland Link
- Past members: Bob Gardener; Adam Henderson; Howard Worf; Jamie Garner; Matt Rogers; Jason Sutton; DJ Loki; Dave Saunders; Dean Rhodes
- Website: inkubussukkubus.org

Inkubus Sukkubus are an English gothic and pagan rock band, formed in 1989 by Candia Ridley, Tony McKormack, and Adam Henderson, who have been described as one of the most enduringly popular underground goth bands in the UK. They also have been described by Mick Mercer as a "zombie version of Fleetwood Mac" in his book Hex Files: The Goth Bible.

== History ==
Inkubus Sukkubus have released albums and toured the UK and internationally ever since their formation as Incubus Succubus in 1989.

In 1995, the band adopted the name Inkubus Sukkubus, citing numerology as the reason for the change, and signed to Resurrection Records. The live line-up changed significantly, adopting the use of a drum machine and sequenced backing, with some additional support by a bodhrán, and Adam Henderson moving back to bass.

In 1996, the band appeared live on British national television on Channel 4's The Big Breakfast, performing the track 'Heartbeat Of The Earth'.

The band have played many of Europe's major dark alternative festivals, including Amphi, M'era Luna, and the Wave-Gotik-Treffen at Leipzig.

In June 2017, the band hosted a weekend event at St Briavels Castle in the Forest of Dean – a celebration of midsummer with storytelling, history, Egyptian dancing, and a handfasting ceremony.

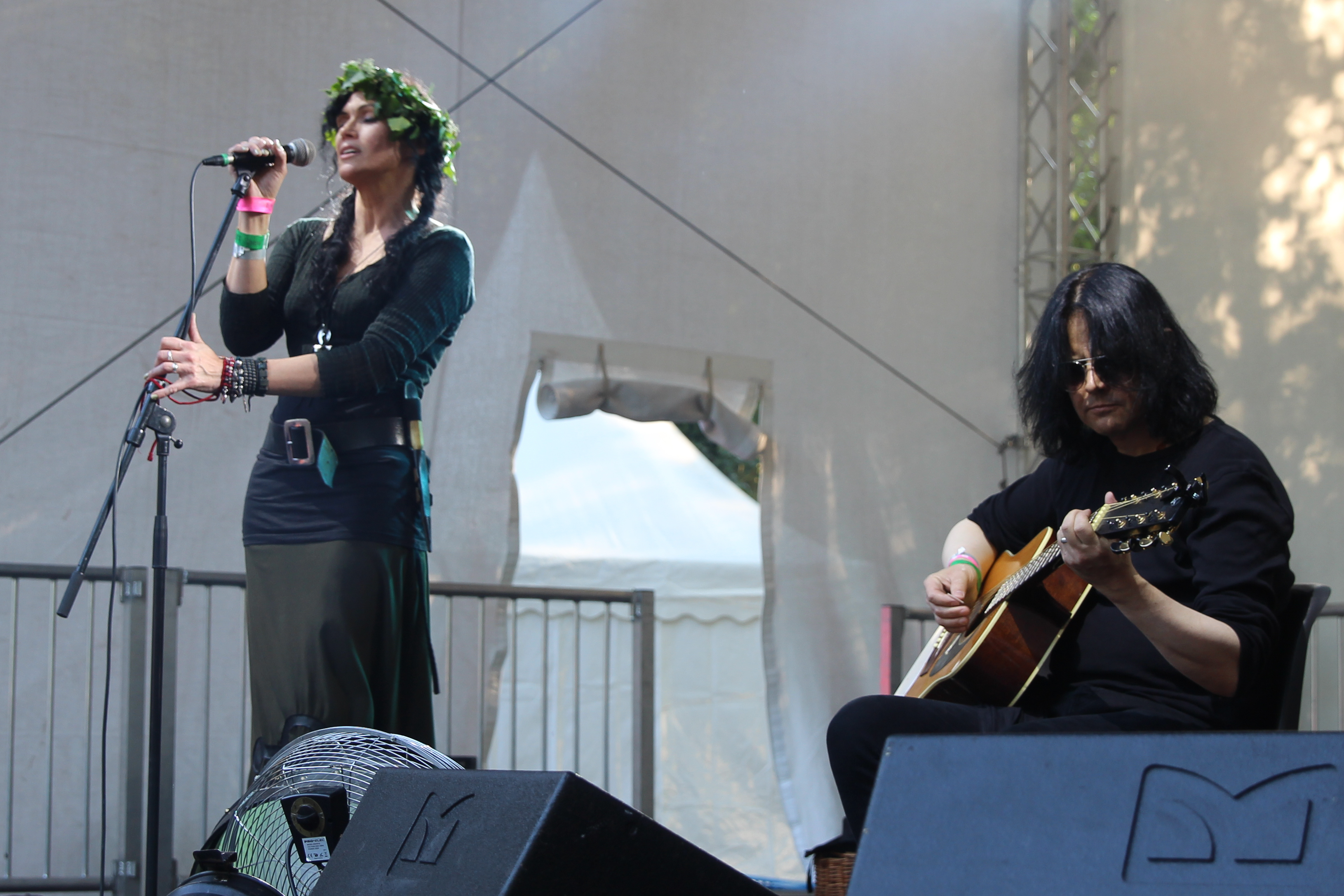
Candia and Tony McKormack at Wave Gotik Treffen, Leipzig (2014)

== Members ==
The group currently consists of guitarist Tony McKormack (ex-Screaming Dead), vocalist Candia McKormack and bassist Roland Link. The band uses a drum machine and sequencer to provide percussion and orchestral backing. They also perform as a fully acoustic act with Abigail Blackman on cello, Nick Gibbs on violin, and Marcus Gilvear on drums.

- Candia McKormack – vocals, lyrics, bodhrán
- Tony McKormack – guitar, keyboards, mandolin, lute, production, songwriting, lyrics, programming, video creation, vocals (ex-Screaming Dead, also in Vampire Division)
- Roland Link – bass guitar

In 2013, Candia was the model for a painting called The Sukkubus, by the award winning fantasy artist, Larry Elmore for use in his Kickstarter.

In 2016, Candia was painted by artist Russell Haines for her 'Faith' exhibition, at Gloucester Cathedral. The band also performed at the launch event which the Bishop of Gloucester, Rachel Treweek, attended. (Members of Inkubus Sukkubus are wiccans)

== Discography ==
=== Albums ===
- 1990: Beltaine (independent release)
- 1993: Belladonna & Aconite
- 1994: Wytches
- 1995: Heartbeat of the Earth
- 1997: Vampyre Erotica
- 1998: Away with the Faeries
- 1999: Wild
- 2001: Supernature
- 2003: The Beast with Two Backs
- 2007: Science & Nature
- 2008: Viva la Muerte
- 2010: The Dark Goddess
- 2011: The Goat
- 2013: Queen of Heaven, Queen of Hell
- 2014: Love Poltergeist
- 2015: Mother Moon
- 2016: Barrow Wake: Tales of Witchcraft and Wonder, Volume One
- 2016: Wikka Woman
- 2017: Belas Knap: Tales of Witchcraft and Wonder, Volume Two
- 2018: Vampire Queen
- 2018: Sabrina – Goddess of the Severn: Tales of Witchcraft and Wonder, Volume Three
- 2019: Lilith Rising
- 2021: The Way Of The Witch
- 2023: She Of A Thousand Names
- 2026: Eternal Monsters

=== Compilation albums ===
- 1998: Away with the Faeries
- 2005: Wytches and Vampyres: The Best Of (Greatest Hits compilation released by US record label Cleopatra Records)
- 2013: The Anthology (Greatest Hits)

=== Singles and EPs ===
- 1991: "Beltaine"
- 1994: "Corn King"
- 2005: Witch Queen (EP)
- 2018: Melancholy Blue limited-edition 12-inch coloured vinyl

=== Movie soundtracks ===
- 2010: The Vampires of Bloody Island

=== Bibliography ===
- 2020: Tales Of Witchcraft And Wonder

== See also ==
- Neopagan music
