= Hatesex =

American goth rock band

- Origin: Los Angeles, California, United States
- Genres: Deathrock; Gothic rock Industrial rock
- Years active: 2003 - 20??(not active in 2022)
- Label: Alice In...
- Members: Benn Ra; Krisanna Marie

Hatesex is an American, Los Angeles–based goth rock band, founded by former Diva Destruction guitarist Benn Ra and vocalist Krisanna Marie.

== History ==
Hatesex was formed in 2003 by Benn Ra, ex-guitarist for Diva Destruction and vocalist Krisanna Marie after meeting through a musicians' advertisement. Working together, the band began developing material for their first release, The Spiritual Palsy, an EP limited to 100 copies. The EP showcased the wide variety of influences the band exhibited and featured a collaboration with Swiss band Celtic Frost on a "gothicized" version of the 1983 Slayer song "Black Magic". The EP met with worldwide acclaim and all four songs featured on the EP received widespread play in dance clubs all over Europe.

The EP's success led to the band signing a recording contract with the Dark Dimensions label group based in Germany. The band's first full-length CD, entitled Unwant, was released on September 26, 2005 and featured 11 songs, including the four songs from The Spiritual Palsy EP. The 2005 release followed a 2006 performance at the Wave-Gotik-Treffen festival in Leipzig, Germany. On February 18, 2011, they released their second album A Savage Cabaret, She Said, which features artwork by photographer and artist Tas Limur. The album was influenced by Marie's involvement in the Cabaret and Burlesque community and is considered a concept album where the lyrics match the CD artwork in an overall theme. The concept was based loosely off of The Seven Deadly Sins. In a 2011 Zillo magazine interview, Marie stated "I was staying in Italy and someone had scraped the words ‘Savage Cabaret’ on the back door at a pizza parlor. It stuck with me for days. A few nights later I sat on a balcony with some friends discussing and trying to remember all the names of the seven sins. The next day I was in Rome waiting to catch a plane back to Berlin and this vision came to me that life was a bizarre cabaret production full of strange characters and sins."

== Line-up ==
- Benn Ra – Guitars, bass and programming
- Krisanna Marie – Vocals and programming

== Discography ==
Releases:

- The Spiritual Palsy EP (CD, EP) Suffer Creek 2004
- Unwant (CD, Album) Alice In... 2005
- A Savage Cabaret, She Said (CD, Album) Alice In... 2011

Tracks appear on:

- Dark Awakening Vol. 4 (2xCD) The Clockwork Heart COP International 2003
- New Dark Age Vol. 1 (2xCD, Comp) Spiritual Palsy Strobelight Records 2003
- New Signs & Sounds 10/05 (CD, Sampler) Subculture Queen Zillo 2005
- Orkus Compilation 13 (CD, Sampler, Enh) The Vapor Chariot Orkus 2005
- Sonic Seducer Cold Hands Seduction Vol. 52 (CD, Sampler, Enh) Unwant Sonic Seducer 2005
- Gospels from Your Stereo (CD, Comp) The Vapor Chariot Strobelight Records 2006
- Gothic Compilation Part XXXI (2xCD, Comp) Hatesex BatBeliever Releases, Indigo (2) 2006
- Goth Is What You Make It [Seven] (2xCD, Comp) Serpentine (Fatale Mix) Batbeliever Releases 2008
- Darkness Before Dawn (2xCD, Comp) A Rose Without Eyes Indigo 2009
- Cold Hands Seduction Vol. 116 (2xCD, Comp) Wanderlust Sonic Seducer 2011
- Gothic Compilation Part LI (2xCD, Comp) Wanderlust Batbeliever Releases 2011
- Zillo CD 03/2011 (CD, Comp) The Forest of I Zillo 2011
