= Mondsucht =

German electronic music group

- Origin: Germany
- Genres: electronic music Gothic; Darkwave; Industrial
- Years active: 1998-present
- Labels: Alice In... Dark Dimensions
- Members: Astrid M. Robert N. Olaf K.

Mondsucht is a German electronic musical group. It was formed by Astrid M., Robert N. and Olaf K. in 1998. The lyrics are in German and/or English, supported by male and female vocals.

== History ==
Mondsucht formed in February 1998. Shortly after, they were signed to record label Alice In... of the Dark Dimensions label group and released their debut album "Der Totentanz" (German for The Death Dance).

In 2000, the band released their first full-length album Willkommen im Jenseits, which featured eight new tracks.

The band's next album, Für die Nacht gemacht was released two years later. Club hits like "Der Totentanz" and "Eiskalter Engel" gained Mondsucht increasing popularity among the German darkwave scene.

Allein unter Schatten, the latest album from Mondsucht appeared in 2004.

== Line-up ==
- Robert N. - Male vocals, composition, production, programming, and lyrics
- Astrid M. - Female vocals and lyrics
- Olaf K. - Music and co-production

== Discography ==
=== Albums ===
- 2000: Willkommen im Jenseits
- 2001: Nachtfalter
- 2002: Für die Nacht gemacht
- 2004: Allein unter Schatten

=== Exclusive tracks appearing on compilations ===
- Ghosts from the Darkside Vol. 3 – "Verlies der Ewigkeit"
- Devil Dance - Flash Club Hits - "Gefangen Im Eigenen Ich"
- Wellenreiter In Schwarz Vol. 4 – "Keine Gnade"
- Nachtschwärmer 3 – "Dunkle Seelen"
- Schattentanz I – "Bittersüßer Tod"
- Sonic Seducer – Cold Hands Seduction Vol. III – "Der Totentanz"
- Zillo Club Hits 5 – "Eiskalter Engel"
- Nachtschwärmer 4 – "Keine Träume"
- New Signs & Sounds 10/2004 (Zillo Compilation) - "Demon Lover"
- Orkus Compilation 3 – "RIP"
- Extreme Sündenfall 1 – "Gier"
