= Blendwerk Antikunst =

Studio album by Stillste Stund
- Released: October 4, 2005 (Germany)
- Recorded: Schallschmiede Würzberg, Germany
- Genres: Electronic, cantastoria, gothic rock, dark wave, industrial, new wave, neoclassical dark wave, spoken word, theatrical, experimental
- Length: 74:00 - bonus disc: 28:25
- Label: Alice In... (Germany)
- Producer: Oliver Uckermann

Stillste Stund chronology
Biestblut - Zwei in Einem (Ein Gedankenkonstrukt in sieben Szenen) (2003)	Blendwerk Antikunst (2005)	Von Rosen und Neurosen - Eine erlesene Sammlung grausamster Albträume (2008)

Blendwerk Antikunst is the fourth album of Stillste Stund. This album was also available in digipack format with a bonus disc.

== Track listing ==
1. "Untertage"– 5:46
2. "Apocalyptic Noon"– 5:53
3. "Alice II (nie allein mit Dir)"– 5:42
4. "Kein Mittel gegen dieses Gift"– 5:05
5. "Darksomely"– 5:49
6. "Ananke"– 6:49
7. "Die Teufelsbuhle"– 7:00
8. "Secludia X"– 6:12
9. "Obsessed with Purple"– 5:32
10. "Geistunter (Psychoclonehardcorechrist)"– 4:33
11. "Blendwerk Antikunst"– 7:22
12. "Lass uns der Regen sein"– 7:36

== Bonus disc: Endwerk EP ==
1. "Endwerk"– 23:02
2. "Endwerk (Short Shylock Version)"– 5:24

== Info ==
- Music & lyrics, instruments, audio sculpturing & production by Oliver Uckermann
- Male vocals by Oliver Uckermann
- Female vocals by Birgit Strunz
- Lyrics & vocal-parts tracks 2, 6, 9 by Birgit Strunz
- Album artwork by Birgit Strunz
- Booklet images track 7 "Die Teufelsbuhle" by courtesy of the Kriminalmuseum Rothenburg
