= Pagan rock =

Genre of rock music

- Stylistic origins: Gothic rock; post-punk; neofolk; dark wave; neo-medieval
- Cultural origins: Late 1980s, United Kingdom

Other topics
- Neopagan music; Modern paganism; Paganism; Goth; Darkwave; Neofolk; Pagan metal; occult rock

Pagan rock is a genre of rock music created by neopagans and which contains themes of neopagan beliefs and traditions. It can also be used to describe bands which are not strictly pagan but are favoured by modern pagans. It developed as a distinct genre in 1980s, and often overlaps with or contains elements of gothic rock and folk music. Pagan rock music involves themes such as spirituality, nature, and folklore.

== History ==
The earliest examples of pagan elements in rock music come from the 1960s and 1970s, with bands like The Beatles, Led Zeppelin, and Black Sabbath using pagan themes such as Norse mythology, occultism, and witchcraft to some degree in their lyrics. However, pagan rock as a distinct genre emerged in the United Kingdom in the 1980s from gothic rock and similar post-punk genres such as darkwave. Gothic rock had become popular among younger pagans as an alternative to the singer-songwriter style which had dominated neopagan music since the 1960s. One of the first bands to be labeled as pagan rock by the press and by their own members was Inkubus Sukkubus, founded in 1989. Inkubus Sukkubus have Wiccan members and their songs use pagan imagery and themes. After Inkubus Sukkubus had achieved a following with their debut album Belladonna & Aconite in 1993, many gothic rock and darkwave bands emerged with neopagan members and pagan lyrical themes. By the mid-2000s, pagan rock had become fully integrated into the mainstream of neopagan institutions, with festivals such as Wave-Gotik-Treffen openly welcoming pagan audiences and bands.

== Characteristics ==
The term "pagan rock" differentiates the genre from new-age music, and from the traditional folk music found at many Neopagan events and gatherings. While many bands under this loose category do incorporate rock and roll styles, one can also find bands inspired by gothic rock, medieval music, the darker elements of traditional and folk music, Celtic music, neofolk and neo-classical, darkwave, ethereal, ambient, industrial and experimental music.

In many ways, the label of "pagan rock" carries with it the same complexities and problems as Christian rock. Like contemporary Christian rock, it is more an umbrella term than a cohesive musical genre. The Pagan rock label can include bands like Inkubus Sukkubus and The Moon and the Nightspirit who explicitly state their allegiance to Neopaganism; bands like Abney Park who have Neopagans in the band but do not label themselves as pagan rock, and bands like Unto Ashes who sing songs involving occult and Neopagan themes but avoid publicly labeling their personal belief systems.

== See also ==
- Neopagan music
- Wave-Gotik-Treffen
- Folk rock
- Goth subculture
- Dark wave
- Neofolk
- Pagan metal
- Viking rock
