= Obsessions (album) =

Studio album by Corpus Delicti
- Released: 1995, Re-released in 1997
- Genre: Gothic rock
- Length: 47:54
- Label: Cemetery records, Nightbreed recordings

Corpus Delicti chronology
Sylphes (1994)	Obsessions (1995)	Sarabands (1996)

Obsessions is an album by gothic rock band Corpus Delicti. The album contains a cover of the song "Atmosphere" by Joy Division. It was remastered and re-released in 1997 with bonus tracks.

== Track listing ==
No.	Title	Length
1.	"An Obsession"	2:08
2.	"Broken"	4:30
3.	"Atmosphere" (Joy Division cover)	3:24
4.	"The Drift"	4:47
5.	"Treasures"	4:22
6.	"Motherland"	6:11
7.	"Dragon Song (Phantom Song)"	3:46
8.	"Dancing Ghost"	3:14
9.	"Appealing Skies"	3:57
10.	"Lies Spoken"	11:34
Total length:		47:53
