= Nachtfalter (album) =

Studio album by Mondsucht
- Released: (Germany) November 26, 2001
- Genre: Electronic music Gothic music Darkwave; Industrial
- Label: Alice In... (Germany)
- Producer: Mondsucht

Professional ratings
Review scores
Source	Rating
Discogs	link

Nachtfalter is the second musical release of Mondsucht.

== Track listing ==
1. "Nachtfalter (Club Version)"–
2. "Nachtfalter (Original)"–
3. "Beast"–
4. "Nachtfalter (M-Version)"–

== Info ==
- All tracks written and produced by Mondsucht
- Male vocals by Robert N.
- Female vocals by Astrid M.
