= Exposing the Sickness =

Studio album by Diva Destruction
- Released: 24 February 2003
- Length: 62:36
- Label: Alice In... (Germany)
- Producers: Debra Fogarty, Benn Ra

Diva Destruction chronology
Passion's Price (2000)	Exposing the Sickness (2003)	Run Cold (2006)

Exposing the Sickness is the second full-length album from Diva Destruction.

The album was rated 1.5 out of 5 stars by AllMusic.

== Track listing ==
1. "Heathcliff"– 4:51
2. "Hypocrite"– 4:45
3. "Black Heart"– 4:02
4. "The One"– 4:22
5. "Playing the Liar"– 4:15
6. "Forgotten"– 4:03
7. "Tempter"– 5:11
8. "Valley of the Scars"– 3:42
9. "You're My Sickness"– 4:56
10. "The Abuser"– 4:40
11. "When Trees Would Dance"– 5:02
12. "Survive"– 4:18
13. "Stolen Bliss"– 4:49
14. "Dance Remix of Trees (By Julian Beeston)"-5:40
