= Stillste Stund =

German musical group

- Origin: Germany
- Genres: Darkwave, Avant-garde, Electronic music
- Years active: 1998–present
- Labels: Alice In...; Dark Dimensions
- Members: Oliver Uckermann; Birgit Strunz
- Past members: Inanis Kurzweil

Stillste Stund (German: Stillest Hour) is a German musical group formed by Oliver Uckermann and female vocalist Birgit S. in 1998. Their songs are written primarily in German, supported by male and female vocalists. The band's name comes from Friedrich Nietzsche's most famous book: Also sprach Zarathustra. Thus Spoke Zarathustra, Part II - Die Stillste Stunde.

== History ==
Stillste Stund released a Demo-Version of Ein Mensch, ein Ding, Ein Traum in 2000. They signed a record contract with music label 'Alice In...' of the Dark Dimensions label group shortly after that.

There were originally two supporting female vocalists: Birgit S. and Inanis Kurzweil. Inanis appeared on the band's first three releases.

Ein Mensch, ein Ding, Ein Traum, the band's debut album, was released in mid-2000. In May 2002, Stillste Stund was nominated as Best Newcomer Band by German music magazine Orkus. The ever-popular "Der Untergang" from Ein Mensch, ein Ding, Ein Traum, was featured on four different compilations, all in two years. Some of the lyrical content is inspired by legends and fairy tales along with the thoughts of such notable German philosophers and novelists as Friedrich Nietzsche, Hugo von Hofmannsthal, Joseph von Eichendorff, and Hermann Hesse.

In 2001, the band released their second full-length album, Ursprung Paradoxon. Its release gained Stillste Stund much popularity throughout Europe and even parts of South America . The music consists of theatrical, classical, and industrial influences. The band's album artwork and sleeve design and website design is all made by Birgit S. This album featured the first part of the Alice Trilogy named "Alice (Der Spiegeltanz). The track was originally written for the anniversary of their label Alice In... and was inspired by Alice's Adventures in Wonderland.

Their next album Biestblut – Zwei in Einem (Ein Gedankenkonstrukt in sieben Szenen) appeared in late 2003. The musical content of this concept album has a much more classical influence and "Nebelland", "Golem", "Weltwinternacht", "Sublunaris", and "Wo die Wirklichkeit schweigt" are among some of the notably popular tracks from Biestblut. This was also the last album featuring additional female vocal support from Inanis Kurzweil.

In 2005, Stillste Stund presented their fourth album Blendwerk Antikunst as a worthy successor to Ursprung Paradoxon. The lyrics are written mostly in German except for three songs in English: "Apocalyptic Noon", "Darksomely", and "Obsessed with Purple".

The most recent album Von Rosen und Neurosen - Eine erlesene Sammlung grausamster Albträume was released on March 14, 2008. The standard edition features twelve tracks all sung in German. The limited edition of this album includes a bonus disc named "Alice EP" with ten tracks that continue and end the very popular story that began on the second album Ursprung Paradoxon with the track "Alice (Der Spiegeltanz)" (amongst other titles, the EP features a remastered version of "Alice (Der Spiegeltanz)" and full-length versions of "Alice II" and "Alice III").

== Ending ==
Stillste Stund claimed to be a "project" instead of a band. It announced that the production of Alice III would complete the project, and that Stillste Stund would dissolve, having fulfilled its purpose. There was speculation about more music being released under a new name, but to date, there has been no further official information.

== Line-up ==
=== Current members ===
- Oliver Uckermann – Since Oliver has been active as a musician for many years and worked with several other bands and projects, the band's debut album Ein Mensch, ein Ding, ein Traum consists of earlier material from the late 80s. The lyrical content, much of which is written by Uckermann himself, is inspired by legends and German fairy tales. "Ebenholz, Schnee & Blut" from Ursprung Paradoxon is based on the Brothers' Grimm fairy tale Snow White. Uckermann explained in an interview with Rock-E-Zine that the thoughts of people like Friedrich Nietzsche and Hermann Hesse are, in part, his inspiration for philosophical lyrics. "Furchtbare Herrin," the prologue from Ein Mensch, ein Ding, ein Traum comes from Friedrich Nietzsche's novel: Thus Spoke Zarathustra, which is where the band's name came from.
- Birgit Strunz – Joined the band alongside Inanis Kurzweil when it was formed in 1998 and has been working with cohort Oliver Uckermann since then. At first, she only provided vocals to the project, but soon began to co-write the lyrics and contribute her song ideas. Together, she and Oliver wrote the lyrics for "Unter Kreuzen", on Ursprung Paradoxon and the two songs "Darwin" and "Nebelland" on Biestblut. Birgit is also the artist behind the visual concept for the Stillste Stund project. She independently wrote the lyrics for the songs "Apocalyptic Noon", "Ananke", "Obsessed With Purple", and most recently, "Tiefenritt" on the band's fifth and newest release Von Rosen und Neurosen - Eine erlesene Sammlung grausamster Albträume.

=== Former members ===
- 1998–2003: Inanis Kurzweil – female vocals

== Discography ==
=== Official albums ===
- 2000: Ein Mensch, ein Ding, ein Traum
- 2001: Ursprung Paradoxon
- 2003: Biestblut – Zwei in Einem (Ein Gedankenkonstrukt in sieben Szenen)
- 2005: Blendwerk Antikunst
- 2008: Von Rosen und Neurosen - Eine erlesene Sammlung grausamster Albträume

=== Promotional releases ===
- 2005: Blendwerk Antikunst EP

=== Compilation contributions ===
- 1999–present: Compilation contributions by Stillste Stund

=== Miscellaneous releases ===
- TV series: Buffy The Vampire Slayer, episode 7x02 Beneath You - Von der Tiefe (inoff. Remix) (2002)
- REMIX for album Cabaret/Variete by Das Ich - Cabaret (2006)
- HÖRSPIEL (Radio play) Schattenreich, Folge (episode) 04 Nachthauch - Darksomely (2007)
- Mindradio.de 13.03.3008 21.00-23.00h cet, Radio Special with Interview, Songs etc. (2008)
