= Unwant =

Studio album by Hatesex
- Released: September 29, 2005
- Recorded: Galvin Recording, Simi Valley, California
- Genre: Gothic; Industrial; Death Rock
- Length: 45:45
- Label: Alice In... (Germany)
- Producer: Bari Bari; Benn Ra

The 1st full-length album of Hatesex.

== Track listing ==
1. "The Crown of Inhuman"– 3:10
2. "Hatesex (Reborn)"– 6:16
3. "Subculture Queen"– 3:06
4. "The Clockwork Heart"– 4:21
5. "Stepdaughter of the Vainglory Empire"– 3:55
6. "Blue Zygote"– 4:17
7. "The Greed of Our Stare"– 5:07
8. "Black Magic"– 6:09
9. "Spiritual Palsy"– 3:44
10. "Unwant"– 3:23
11. "The Vapor Chariot"– 3:37

== Info ==
- All songs recorded and mixed Bari-Bari except for where noted.
- Lyrics on "Spiritual Palsy" written by Benn Ra and Krisanna Marie
- Lyrics on "Unwant," and "The Vapor Chariot" written by Benn Ra
- Additional Vocals on "Unwant" by Benn Ra
- Album artwork by Benn Ra
- Lead vocals on "Black Magic" by Martin Eric Ain of Celtic Frost.
- Lead guitar solo on "Black Magic" by Erol Unala (Apollyon Sun/Ex-Celtic Frost)
- Drums on "The Vapor Chariot" by Tony Havoc (Scarlet's Remains)
- Martin and Erol's tracks were produced my Tom G. Fischer at the Bunker in Zurich, Switzerland.
- Bass guitar on "BlueZygote" by Carl Tapia.

== Notes ==
- "Hatesex (Reborn)" is a version of a song by one of Benn's previous bands, The Secular.
- "Black Magic" was originally performed by Slayer.
