= Bloody Dead and Sexy =

German deathrock band

- Origin: Germany
- Genres: Deathrock
- Years active: 1997–present
- Label: Alice In...
- Members: Rosa Iahn; Tim Schande; Björn Henningson; Matias 13
- Past members: Wolfgang Reetz d'hAmm

Bloody Dead and Sexy is a German deathrock band formed in 1997.

== History ==
The band was founded in 1997 by Rosa Iahn, Tim Schande, Björn Henningson, and Wolfgang Reetz. In 2000, founding member Wolfgang Reetz died in a motorcycle accident and was replaced by guitar player d'hAmm. After some years of touring in Europe and contributing songs to compilations (most well known is the song "Bloody Rose"), Bloody Dead and Sexy signed to the well-known German goth-label Alice In... and released two albums, "Paint It Red" in 2001 and "Narcotic Room" in 2005. In 2004, Bloody Dead and Sexy toured the United States. Their popularity among the followers of the deathrock-scene worldwide became clear, when they were asked to headline the Wave Gotik Treffen, the world's biggest goth-festival in Leipzig, two years in a row (2005 and 2006). After some exchanges of the guitar player in the following years, Matias 13 joined the band in 2006. The band would perform again in Wave-Gotik-Treffen in 2010.

The latest album, Bad Ambient, features former Christian Death singer Gitane Demone and was released in May 2013.

== Discography ==
- 7" Here Come the Flies (2002)
- CD Paint It Red (2003)
- CD Narcotic Room (2005)
- CD Narcotic Room (2005) + Bonus EP (4 Tracks)
- CD Paint It Red Re-release (2006) (+ 4 Extra-Tracks)
- CD An Eye on You (2010)
- MCD Liquid Grey (2011)
- CD Bad Ambient (2013)
- CD Crucifixion Please! (2017)
- CD/LP Fade to Glitter (2022)
