= Allein unter Schatten =

Studio album by Mondsucht
- Released: (Germany) September 27, 2004
- Genres: electronic music Gothic music Darkwave; Industrial
- Length: 57:14
- Label: Alice In... (Germany)
- Producer: Mondsucht

Allein unter Schatten is the third full-length album of Mondsucht.

== Track listing ==
1. "Herbstabend"– 2:31
2. "Never Again"– 3:53
3. "Gier"– 3:41
4. "Schattenwelt"– 3:39
5. "Nichts"– 3:43
6. "Demon Lover"– 4:10
7. "RIP"– 3:12
8. "Im Schatten"– 5:00
9. "Alles für Dich"– 4:40
10. "Immer Fort"- 3:54
11. "Weißes Licht"– 4:35
12. "Süße Wonne"-4:26
13. "Waterfalls"-3:06
14. "Alles Für Dich 2004"-5:02
15. "Schwarzes Herz 2004"-4:22

== Info ==
- All tracks written and produced by Mondsucht
- Male vocals by Robert N.
- Female vocals by Astrid M.
