= Screaming Dead =

English punk rock band

- Origin: Cheltenham, England
- Genres: Punk rock, horror punk
- Years active: 1980–1985, 1997–1999, 2014–present
- Labels: No Future, Angel, Resurrection Records
- Members: Sam Bignall (formerly Sam Missile); Mal Page; Mazzy; Hugh Fairlie
- Past members: Tony McKormack; Mark Ogilvie; Nick Upton

Screaming Dead are a punk rock band from Cheltenham formed in 1980, who have often been characterized as "horror punk". They released several singles and EPs with indie chart success, before splitting up in 1985. They reformed in 1997; disbanded again in 1999; and reformed in 2014.

== History ==
The band - named after the English title of Drácula contra Frankenstein, the 1972 horror film directed by Jesús Franco - was formed by guitarist Tony McCormack (later McKormack), who recruited former singer with The Waste, Sam Missile (Simon Bignall), bass guitarist Mal Page, and drummer Mark Ogilvie. The band built up a strong local following which spread farther afield with coverage in fanzines such as Gez Lowery's Rising Free and through sales of their demo tape. They followed their first tape with a more formal release, the Children of the Boneyard Stones cassette, which came with a badge and a copy of the band's own fanzine, Warcry. They then self-financed their debut vinyl release, the "Valley of the Dead" single, initially released on their own Skull Records label, but when it sold out of its first pressing within a week it was picked up by No Future records. The band's next release, the "Night Creatures" 12-inch single, saw them break into the UK Indie Chart, reaching number 22 in September 1983. While the band were at times tagged as Goths, the label was rejected by Bignall, who in a posthumous interview stated "Screaming Dead were a punk rock band, there's no doubt about that! We had a bit of an interest in the horror theme, and that was how we decided to present ourselves." For their next release, the band recorded a cover of the Rolling Stones' "Paint It Black" which was also an indie hit, and was recorded as a tribute of sorts to Brian Jones who is buried in their home town of Cheltenham. In 1984, taking inspiration from X-Ray Spex, the band recruited saxophonist Nick Upton, the band also signing to Nine Mile Records, who issued their last two releases on the Angel label. The change in sound lost a lot of fans, and with interest in punk rock declining, the band split up in 1985.

In 1989, McKormack formed pagan gothic rock band Incubus Succubus with Candia Ridley and Adam Henderson, and in 1997 formed a new version of Screaming Dead, without Page or Upton, touring Germany twice and recording the album Death Rides Out, released on Resurrection Records, before they disbanded again in 1999.

The band reformed in 2014 with a line up of Sam Bignall, Mal Page, Mazzy, and Hugh Fairlie.

== Discography ==
Chart placings from the UK Indie Chart

=== Singles and EPs ===
- "Valley of the Dead" 7" (1982), Skull - reissued by No Future
- "Night Creatures" 12" (1983), No Future (no. 22)
- "Paint It Black" 7" (1984), No Future (no. 38)
- The Danse Macabre Collection 12" (1984), Angel (no. 31)
- "A Dream of Yesterday" (1985), Angel (no. 42)

=== Albums ===
- Children of the Boneyard Stones (cassette-only) (1982), Recreational Tapes
- Bring Out Yer Dead (1993), Angel
- Death Rides Out (1997), Resurrection
