= Javorek (surname) =

Javorek, Czech female Javorková, Slovak Javoreková, is a Slavic surname. Javor means maple. Notable people with the surname include:

- Anna Javorková
- Istvan Javorek (born 1943), American sports conditioning coach
- Justín Javorek (1936–2021), Slovak footballer and manager
- Petr Javorek (born 1986), Czech footballer
