= Corpus Delicti (band) =

French gothic rock band

- Origin: Nice, France
- Genres: Post-punk, gothic rock
- Years active: 1993–1998; 2020-present
- Labels: Twilight Music, Cleopatra Records
- Website: http://www.corpusdelicti.com

Corpus Delicti are a French band formed in Nice in 1992. Its members are Sébastien (vocals), Franck (guitar), Chrys (bass) and Roma (drums). Their debut album Twilight (1993) became a benchmark for the post-punk rock genre.

After two more albums, they broke up in 1997 but the cult around Corpus Delicti continued to grow. A comprehensive biography (La Déliquescence des ombres by Tony Leduc-Gugnalons) was published by Camion Blanc in 2011. In 2019, the American label Cleopatra signed the band for a series of reissues.

In 2020, 23 years after their split, the original quartet resumed rehearsals with the aim of returning to the stage. Unfortunately, the pandemic and Roma's health problems (osteoarthritis of the hands) decided otherwise and the band had to find a new drummer. Corpus Delicti finally came back to life live, with a first sold-out concert on 7 May 2022 at the MJC Picaud in Cannes. This date kicked off a series of sold-out concerts: London, Rome, Madrid, Athens, Paris and Mexico City. This was followed by major summer festivals in Germany, Portugal and Belgium.

In 2023, they released a new single, "Chaos". In 2024, the band played in Manchester Cathedral and went on tour throughout Latin America, in Peru, Costa Rica, Colombia and a return to Mexico City. At the end of the year, the band captured these concerts on record, with the release of a double live album recorded in Mexico City in 2023 and entitled From Dust to Light, followed by a new single, "A Fairy Lie".

The band will be releasing a new album, Liminal, on 28 November 2025.

== Reception ==
The website Sens Critique lists them as one of the 35 must-haves of the genre, alongside the likes of the Cure, Bauhaus and Joy Division, stating that "their second album is a masterpiece of the genre". The Italian music magazine Ascension refers to them as "an incredible mix between Bowie, Bauhaus and Christian Death". In 2025, the prestigious UK magazine Uncut published a special issue on the 200 essential gothic rock albums, and they were one of only two French bands to feature on the list (alongside Kas Product), with the album Sylphes.

== Members ==
- Sébastien Pietrapiana alias "Sebastian" - vocals and synths
- Laurence Romanini alias "Roma" - drums and percussion
- Jérôme Schmitt alias "Jerome" - guitar, synths and programming
- Christophe Baudrion alias "Chrys" - bass
- Franck Amendola alias "Franck" - guitar (on Twilight)

== Discography ==
=== Albums ===
- Twilight (1993), Hit Import/Glasnost Records
- Sylphes (1994), Hit Import/Glasnost Records
- Obsessions (1995), Cemetery Records (remastered and re-released in 1997 with extra tracks on Nightbreed Recordings)
- Syn:Drom (1998, as Corpus), Season of Mist
- From Dust to Light (2024), Twilight Music
- Liminal (2025), Twilight Music

=== Compilations ===
- Sarabands (1996), Cleopatra
- The Best of Corpus Delicti (1998), Cleopatra
- The History of Corpus Delicti (1998), Radio Luxor
- From Dawn to Twilight (2006), D-monic
- A New Saraband of Sylphes (2007), D-monic
- Highlights (2010), D-monic
- Last Obsessions (2011), D-monic

=== Singles ===
- "Noxious (The Demon's Game)" (1994), Hit Import/Glasnost Records
- "Chaos" with B-side "The Crown", 7" vinyl/digital (2023), Twilight Music
- "A Fairy Lie", digital (2024), Twilight Music
