= The Last Days of Jesus =

Slovak rock band

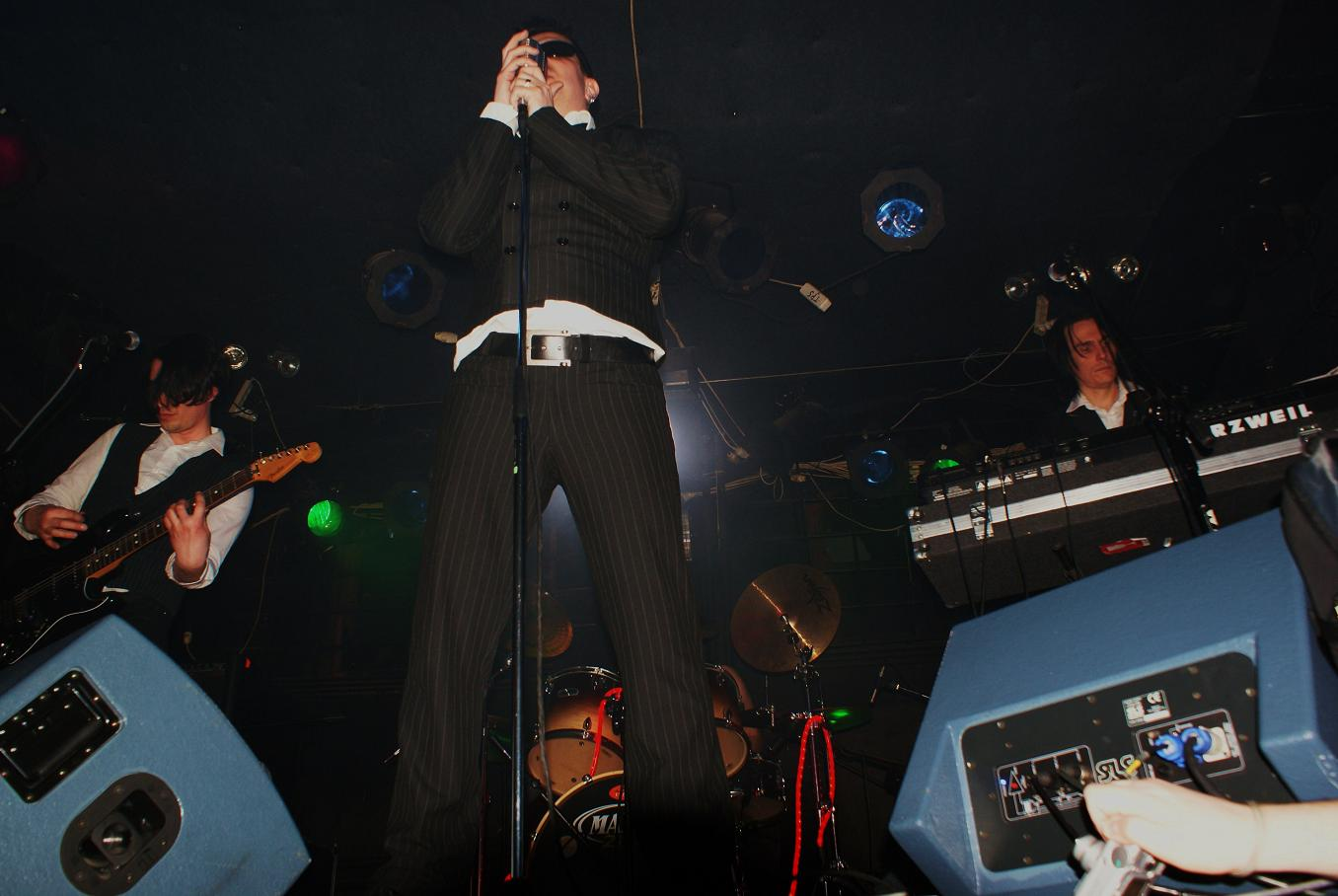
- The Last Days of Jesus during Old Skull festival in Warsaw, Poland, 2009

Background information
- Origin: Slovakia
- Genres: Deathrock; post-punk; gothic rock
- Years active: 1993–present
- Label: Strobelight
- Members: MaryO; Vajco; Feššy; Anjou

The Last Days of Jesus is a Slovak rock band. Formed in Bratislava in May 1992, the band combines the spirit of old school deathrock with new musical sounds and patterns. The name originates from a headline band member MaryO read in an American newspaper.

== History ==
MaryO formed the band with Vajco on drums and Sulo, an organist. They then collected Feššy and Andrea, an early bass player. During 1994 this line-up recorded their first demotape and played several shows around Slovakia culminating in a support slot for Das Ich and Faith and the Muse. They continued to tour throughout 1995 including Germany with Marquee Moon and Forthcoming Fire and completed another demo tape, gaining considerable interest within the European goth scene. A few lineup changes have occurred since then and apart from bringing in a session bass player for their studio albums their current lineup continues to record and play live.

The band has made many (mainly gothic) festival appearances almost every year since their formation including Wave-Gotik-Treffen five times. In 2003 and 2004 they did two mini-tours of the UK which included Beyond the Veil and Dead and Buried. Also in 2004 they were featured in a Slovak music TV show which resulted in their only live album to date. On the side MaryO organises regular events under BatCave.SK

== Personnel ==
- MaryO (vocals)
- Feššy (guitar)
- Anjou (keyboards)
- Vajco (drums)
- Bajo (bass)

== Discography ==
=== Albums ===
- The Time of Crucifixtion (Demotape, 1994)
- Sepulcrum Christi Viventis (Demotape, 1995)
- Arma Christi (Alice in..., 1997)
- Narrentanz (Musik für die Massen) (New Christian Music, 1999)
- Songs From the Psycho TV (Monitor-EMI, 2001)
- Monsters Paranoia Circus (Live Album) (The Last Days of Jesus, 2004)
- Alien Road(Strobelight Records, 2004)
- Dead Machines' Revolution! (Strobelight Records, 2007)
- The Last Circus (Zim-Zum, 2017)

=== Extended plays ===
- Once Upon a Time in the East (Strobelight Records, 2011)

=== Singles ===
- Guns'n'Drums'n'March'n'Fun (Batcave.sk, 2003)

=== Other releases ===
- Animal Boy & Mechanical Toy (2005) (CD Single supplement for a book "Kvapky krvi, štruktúry sadomasochizmu" Drops of Blood, Structures of Sadomasochism by Martin Gerboc)

=== Compilation tracks ===
- "Der Trug" on The Gothic Grimore Compilation Vol.2 (1996)
- "Dark Side of My Mind" on The Sounds of New Hope (1997)
- "Still Alive" (f.r.s.t. version) on Künstler zum 7. Wave- und Gotik-Treffen (Orkus, 1998)
- "Still Alive" on New Alternatives Vol.5 (Nightbreed, 2001)
- "Arrest the Angels" on Cold (2001)
- "Guns'n'Drums'n'March'n'Fun" on New Dark Age Vol.1 (Strobelight Records, 2004)
- "Everyday Is Halloween" on Gothic Compilation XXIV (Batbeliever, 2004)
- "Pet Sematary" on Gabba Gabba Metal: A Metal Tribute to the Ramones (2004)
- "Guns'n'Drums'n'March'n'Fun" on Death Dizko Vol.1 (Death Dizko Division, 2005)
- "Death Song" on Sonic Seducer/Cold Hands Seduction (Sonic seducer, 2005)
- "Connected or Infected" on New Dark Age Vol.2 (Strobelight Records, 2005)
- "Everyday Is Halloween" on Castle Party 2005 (Metal Mind Records, 2005)
