= Diva Destruction =

American rock band

- Origin: Los Angeles, California, U.S.
- Genres: Dark wave; gothic rock
- Years active: 1998–present
- Labels: Alice In..., Metropolis Records
- Members: Debra Fogarty

Diva Destruction is an American rock band. It was formed by singer-songwriter Debra Fogarty in 1998. Diva Destruction signed to German music label Alice In... of the Dark Dimensions label group. Diva Destruction is also signed to Metropolis Records in North America.

== Line-up ==
Current members

- Debra Fogarty - vocals, lyrics, songwriting, keyboards, drum programming, and production on all albums (from 1998 until present)

Past members

- Benn Ra - guitars, programming and production on Exposing the Sickness (from 2000 until 2003)
- Sharon Blackstone - backup vocals on Exposing the Sickness and live performances (from 2000 until 2003)
- Jimmy Cleveland - drums (live performances and a song on Exposing the Sickness) (from 2000 until 2004)
- Anthem - drumkit (live performances and recording of Exposing the Sickness) (from 2001 until 2003)
- Severina Sol - vocals, lyrics (from 1999 until 2000)

== Discography ==
Albums

- 2000: Passion's Price
- 2003: Exposing the Sickness
- 2006: Run Cold

Singles

- 2023: Break Free
- 2024: Don't You Dare
- 2025: UnBroken

Tracks appearing on compilations

- Unquiet Grave 2000 – The Broken Ones
- Der Seelen Tiefengrund 3 · Music for Candlelight & Redwine – Hate You To Love You
- Unquiet Grave III: Unearthing the Ground – Enslaved
- Zillo Romantic Sounds 3 – Lover's Chamber
- Orkus Compilation IV – Tempter
- Sonic Seducer Cold Hands Seduction Vol. 63 – Rewriting History
- Anyone Can Play Radiohead - Climbing Up The Walls
- A Gothic Tribute To The Cocteau Twins - Persephone
