= Cantastoria =

Form of visual entertainment

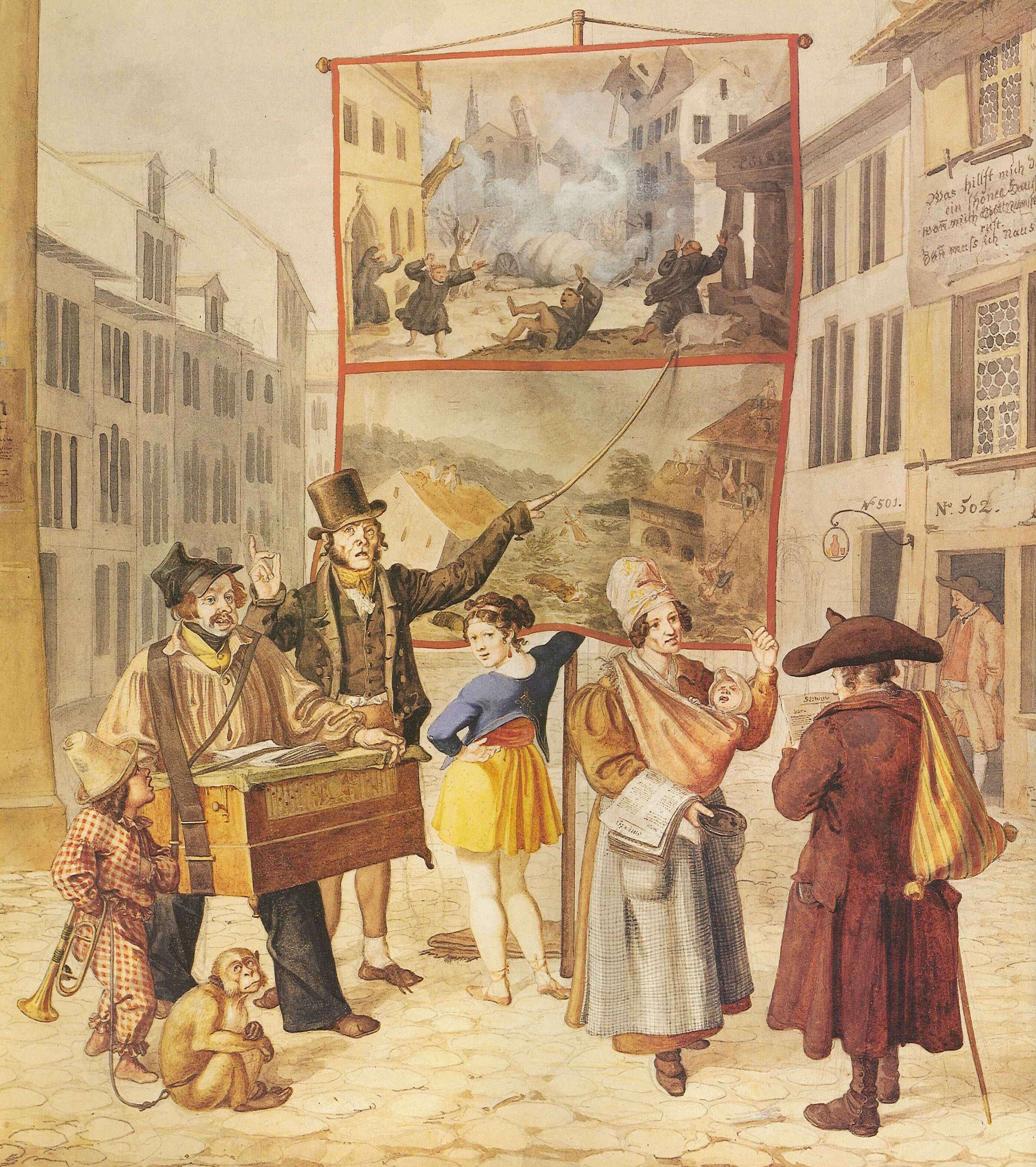
A moritat singer in Basel depicted in a 19th-century drawing

Cantastoria (Italian: [ˌkantaˈstɔːrja]; also spelled cantastorie [ˌkantaˈstɔːrje], canta storia or canta historia) comes from Italian for "story-singer" and is known by many other names around the world. It is a theatrical form where a performer tells or sings a story while gesturing to a series of images. These images can be painted, printed or drawn on any sort of material.

== Asia ==
In 6th-century India, religious tales called saubhikas were performed by traveling storytellers who carried banners painted with images of gods from house to house. Another form called yamapapaka featured the storytellers carrying vertical cloth scrolls and sung stories of the afterlife. In recent times, this is still performed by Chitrakar women from West Bengal, India.

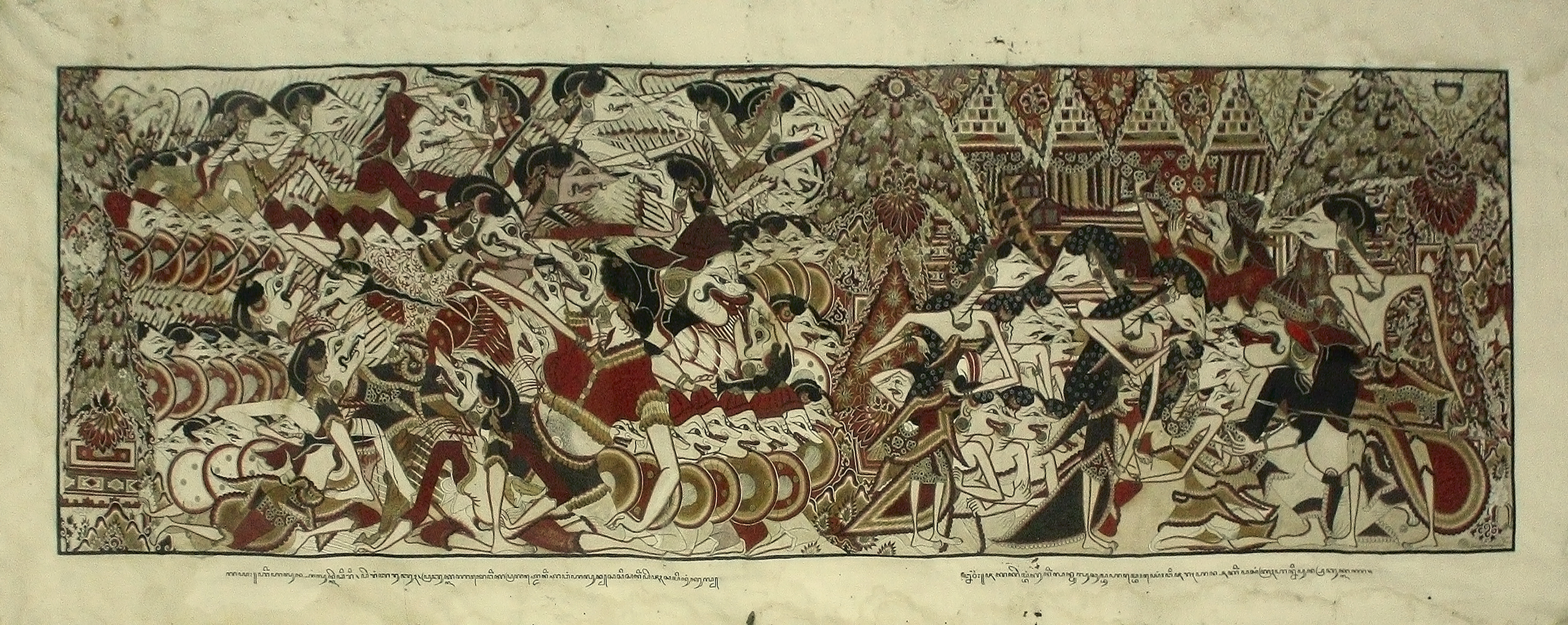
Wayang beber, a Javanese form of cantastoria art thought to be extinct but was rediscovered in the 1960s.

In Tibet, this was known as ma-ni-pa and in other parts of China this was known as pien. In Indonesia, the scroll was made horizontally which is called the wayang beber and employed four performers: a man who sings the story, two men who operate the rolling of the scroll, and a woman who holds a lamp to illuminate particular pictures featured in the story. Other Indonesian theater forms, which are labelled as shadow play are the wayang kulit and wayang golek which uses rod puppetry, these are still performed today.

In Japan, cantastoria appears as etoki (絵解) or emaki (絵巻) in the form of hanging scrolls divided into separate panels, foreshadowing the popular modern manga, or Japanese comics. Etoki sometimes took the shape of little booklets, or even displays of dolls posed on the roadside with backgrounds behind them. In the 20th century, Japanese candymen on bicycles would bring serial shows called kamishibai (紙芝居) where the story was told on a series of changing pictures that slid in and out of an open-framed box. Some kamishibai shows had a raree show element to them, where a viewer could pay extra to peer through a hole and see a supposed artifact from the story.

== Europe ==
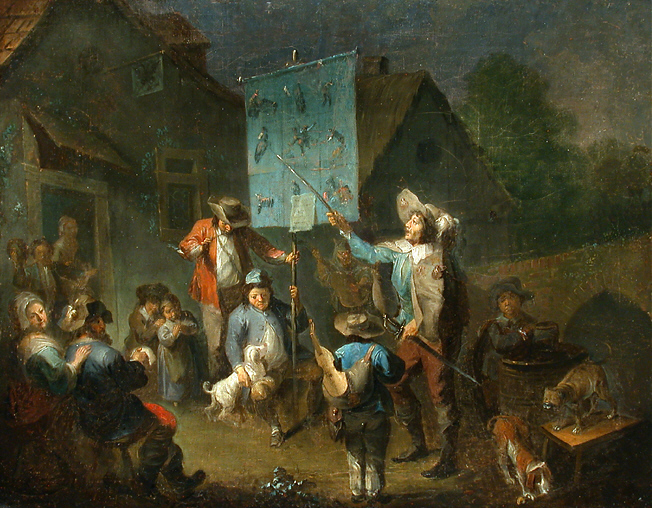
Depiction of a Dutch liedjeszanger ("song-singer") and his Bänkelsang from the 17th or 18th century

In 16th-century Italy, prayers would often be sung in the presence of illuminated scrolls while secular society produced the cantambanco or "singing bench" where a person would stand on a bench pointing to pictures with a stick. In Spain up to the 19th century there were blind men who would be accompanied by a young helper who would make a living by going from town to town where they would display illustrations, and the blind man would recite or sing a story, often about crimes, while his helper pointed at the illustration relevant at that point. These were called "romances de ciego" (blind man stories).

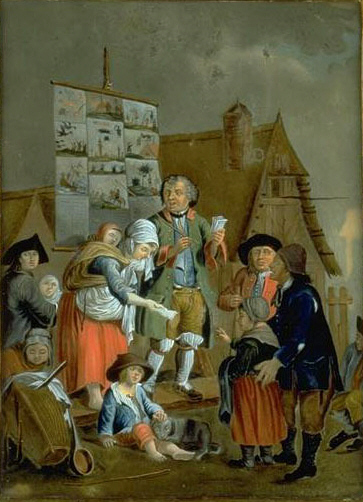
A Bänkelsänger in Switzerland

The singing bench migrated northward to Central and Northern Europe where it served as sensationalist quasi-news about murder, fires, death, affairs, sex and scandals. Performers of such controversial bench songs were seen as vagrants and troublemakers and were often arrested, exiled, or ostracised for their activities.

In Germany, itinerant balladeers performed Bänkelsang (bench song) banner shows for four centuries until the Nazis banned the practice in the 1940s. A subgenre of Bänkelsang is the Moritat, a type of murder ballad. The German Bänkelsang and Moritat survive in Bertolt Brecht's The Threepenny Opera (German: Die Dreigroschenoper) in the Ballad of Mack the Knife (German: Die Moritat von Mackie Messer) as well as in the performance work of Peter Schumann.

In the Czech lands, banner shows were called kramářská píseň. Most of them fell into oblivion, with the notable exception of a parody song Cannoneer Jabůrek. In Hungary, the term is called képmutogatás.

== See also ==
- Storytelling
- Oral storytelling
- Oral tradition

== Sources ==
- Mair, Victor H., Painting and Performance: Chinese Picture Recitation and its Indian Genesis. Honolulu: University of Hawaii Press, 1988.
- Too Many Captain Cooks, film by Penny McDonald starring Paddy Wainburranga
- Mariangela Giusti and Urmila Chakraborty (editors), Immagini Storie Parole. Dialoghi di formazione coi dipinti cantati delle donne Chitrakar del West Bengal, 2014, ISBN 978-88-97683-39-1
