= Kerli discography =

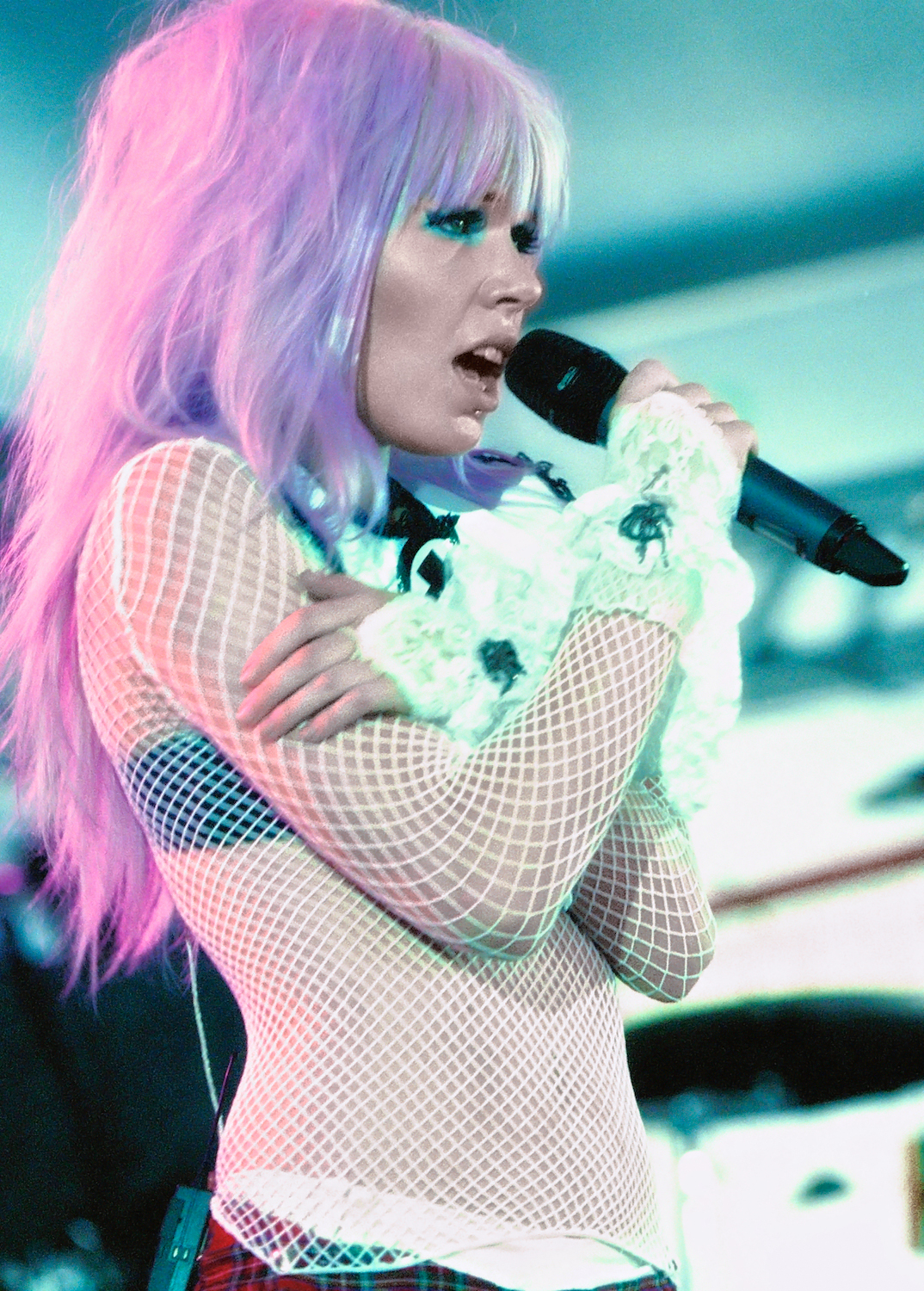
- Kerli performing in 2011
- Studio albums: 2
- Extended plays: 3
- Singles: 16
- Music videos: 15

The discography of Estonian singer-songwriter Kerli consists of two studio albums, three extended plays (EPs), sixteen singles and fifteen music videos. Kerli signed a record deal with Island Records in 2006 and released in July 2008 her debut album Love Is Dead, which peaked at number 126 on the Billboard 200 chart in the United States. The album's lead single "Walking on Air" reached the top 40 of European territories such as Austria, Germany, Italy and Switzerland, resulting in its summit at number seventy-five on the European Hot 100 Singles.

In 2010, Kerli's "Tea Party" was a single from the Alice in Wonderland film inspired soundtrack Almost Alice. After the singles "Army of Love" (2011) and "Zero Gravity" (2012)—which peaked at number one and six on the U.S. Hot Dance Club Songs, respectively—her second EP, originally intended to be a full studio album, Utopia, was released in March 2013, with "The Lucky Ones" released as its lead single. Kerli's second studio album, Shadow Works, was released in 2019.

== Studio albums ==
Title	Details	Peak chart positions					Sales
Title	Details	BEL (FL)	BEL (WA)	ITA	SWI	US	Sales
Love Is Dead	Released: 7 July 2008; Label: Island; Formats: CD, digital download	61	52	64	92	126	US: 67,000 (Note: United States sales figures for Love Is Dead as of May 2011.)
Shadow Works	Released: 22 February 2019; Label: Seeking Blue; Formats: CD, digital download	—	—	—	—	— (Note: Shadow Works peaked at number 24 on the Billboard Heatseekers Albums chart in the United States.)	

== Extended plays ==
Title	Details	Peak chart positions
Title	Details	US
Kerli	Released: 16 October 2007; Label: Island; Formats: CD, digital download	—
Utopia	Released: 19 March 2013; Label: Island Def Jam; Formats: CD, digital download	196
Deepest Roots	Released: 29 November 2016; Label: Tiny Cute Monster; Formats: CD	—
OVERSOUL	Released: 7 June 2024; Label: Tiny Cute Monster; Formats: CD, LP, digital download, streaming	—

== Singles ==
=== As lead artist ===
Title	Year	Peak chart positions							Album
Title	Year	AUT	BEL (FL)	BEL (WA)	GER	ITA	SWI	US Dance	Album
"Let's Go" (with Locatellis)	2003	—	—	—	—	—	—	—	Non-album single
"Walking on Air"	2008	35	32	12	25	20	37	—	Love Is Dead
"The Creationist"^{[B]} (featuring Cesare Cremonini)	2009	—	—	—	—	61	—	—	Love Is Dead
"Tea Party"	2010	—	—	—	—	—	—	—	Almost Alice
"Army of Love"	2011	—	—	—	—	—	—	1	Non-album singles
"Zero Gravity"	2012	—	—	—	—	—	—	6	Non-album singles
"The Lucky Ones"	2012	—	—	—	—	—	—	1	Utopia
"Love Me or Leave Me"	2013	—	—	—	—	—	—	(Note: Love Me or Leave Me did not enter the Billboard Dance Club Songs chart, but peaked at number 31 on the Dance/Electronic Songs chart.)	Utopia
"Feral Hearts"	2016	—	—	—	—	—	—	—	Deepest Roots
"Blossom"	2016	—	—	—	—	—	—	—	Deepest Roots
"Diamond Hard"	2016	—	—	—	—	—	—	—	Deepest Roots
"Spirit Animal"	2016	—	—	—	—	—	—	—	Non-album single
"Sound of Walking Away" (with Illenium)	2017	—	—	—	—	—	—	50	Awake
"Savages"	2018	—	—	—	—	—	—	—	Shadow Works
"Better"	2019	—	—	—	—	—	—	—	Shadow Works
"Legends"	2019	—	—	—	—	—	—	—	Shadow Works
"21st Century Kids"	2023	—	—	—	—	—	—	—	Non-album single
"Alchemise"	2024	—	—	—	—	—	—	—	OVERSOUL
"The Witching Hour"	2024	—	—	—	—	—	—	—	OVERSOUL
"Search + Destroy"	2024	—	—	—	—	—	—	—	OVERSOUL
"The Art of Being Alone"	2024	—	—	—	—	—	—	—	OVERSOUL
"—" denotes releases that did not chart.

=== As a featured artist ===
Title	Year	Peak chart positions	Album
Title	Year	US EDM & Dance	Album
"Glow in the Dark" (tyDi featuring Kerli)	2012	—	Non-album singles
"Something About You" (tyDi featuring Kerli)	2013	—	Non-album singles
"Stardust" (tyDi featuring Kerli)	2014	—	Non-album singles
"Worlds Apart" (Seven Lions featuring Kerli)	2014	—	Worlds Apart
"Kaleidoscope" (Benny Benassi featuring Kerli)	2014	—	Non-album singles
"Back to Life" (Don Diablo featuring Kerli) - (Uncredited)	2014	—	Non-album singles
"Raindrops" (SNBRN featuring Kerli)	2015	25	Non-album singles
"Build The Cities" (Karma Fields featuring Kerli)	2015	—	New Age | Dark Age
"Sound of Where'd You Go" (Illenium featuring Kerli, Said The Sky and 1788-L)	2018	—	Awake
"Another Life: Motion Picture Collection" (Motionless in White featuring Kerli)	2020	—	Another Life / Eternally Yours: Motion Picture Collection
"By the Light of the Moon" (Seven Lions featuring Kerli)	2025	—	Asleep in the Garden of Infernal Stars

=== Promotional singles ===
Title	Year	Album
"Love Is Dead"	2007	Love Is Dead
"Creepshow"	2008	Love Is Dead

== Guest appearances ==
List of non-single guest appearances, with other performing artists
Title	Year	Other artist(s)	Album
"Beautiful Inside"	2004	—N/a	Kevad Hitt 2004
"When Nobody Loves You"	2008	—N/a	007: Quantum of Solace
"Strange"	2010	Tokio Hotel	Almost Alice
"Immortal"	2012	None	Frankenweenie Unleashed! (Music Inspired by the Motion Picture)
"City / Light / Nintendo / Fuck"	2012	Vespertine	The End of the World Suite
"Here and Now"	2013	Cash Cash	Overtime
"Keep It Close"	2014	Seven Lions	Worlds Apart
"Perfect Crush"	2014	tyDi	Redefined
"Never Surrender" (Credited as "Tiny Cute One")	2015	Hector Fonseca	FT.
"Never Gone"	2018	Said the Sky	Wide-Eyed
"What’s Wrong With Us"	2022	Josh Cumbee	TRUSTFALL
"… Thrice Woven"	2025	Seven Lions	Asleep in the Garden of Infernal Stars
"Fly Around The World"	2026	Zeds Dead	Return to the Return (of the Spectrum of Intergalactic Happiness)

== Music videos ==
Title	Year	Director(s)
"Goodbye"	2007	Dave Schwep
"Love Is Dead"	2008	Josh Mond
"Walking on Air"	2008	Aggressive
"Creepshow"	2008	Daniel Müntinen and Jaagup Metsalu
"Tea Party"	2010	Justin Harder
"Army of Love"	2011	Kaimar Kukk
"Zero Gravity"	2012	Alon Isocianu
"Glow in the Dark" (tyDi featuring Kerli)	2012	Darren Teale
"The Lucky Ones"	2012	Ethan Chancer
"Worlds Apart" (Seven Lions featuring Kerli)	2014	Bobby Galvan
"Feral Hearts"	2016	CJ Kask
"Feral Hearts" (The Sacred Forest Sessions)	2016	CJ Kask
"Blossom"	2016	CJ Kask
"Blossom" (The Halls of Heaven Session)	2016	CJ Kask
"Diamond Hard"	2016	Kerli
"Savages"	2019	Everett Lee Sung
"21st Century Kids"	2023	Kerli
"By the Light of the Moon" (Seven Lions featuring Kerli)	2026	Gundars Magone

== Songwriting credits ==
Song	Year	Artist(s)	Album
"Ishy"	2009	Bad Boy Bill & Alyssa Palmer	The Album
"Too Much Is Never Enough"	2009	Lisa Lois	Smoke
"I Feel Immortal"	2010	Tarja Turunen ft. Jason Hook	What Lies Beneath
"Iialgi"	2010	Violina ft. Birgit Õigemeel	Maagline
"Skyscraper"	2011	Demi Lovato	Unbroken
"Is It Worth It"	2013	Soraya Arnelas	Universe In Me
"Pop"	2014	Mord Fustang featuring Links	—N/a
"See Through"	2014	Pentatonix	PTX, Vol. III
"Ghost"	2015	Conjure One	Holoscenic
"Immortality"	2015	Cartoon ft. Kristel Aaslaid	—N/a
"I Wanna Be"	2016	Katy B & Chris Lorenzo	Honey
"Fade Away"	2020	Cartoon & Ewert and The Two Dragons	—N/a
"La Última"	2022	Aitana	La Última
"Bad Habit"	2023	Jéja & Zaug	—N/a
"I Like It With You"	2023	Daniel Levi	14/02
