= Shadow Works =

2019 album by Kerli

Studio album by Kerli
- Released: 22 February 2019
- Genre: Electropop
- Length: 42:21
- Label: Seeking Blue
- Producer: AFSHeeN; Crash Cove; Josh Cumbee; EvanS; Kerli; Kill Dave; Said the Sky; Ago Teppand; Varien

Kerli chronology
| Deepest Roots (2016) | Shadow Works (2019) |

Singles from Shadow Works
- 1. "Savages" Released: 30 November 2018; 2. "Better" Released: 18 January 2019; 3. "Legends" Released: 8 February 2019

Shadow Works is the second studio album by Estonian singer and songwriter Kerli. It was released on 22 February 2019 via Seeking Blue. It was preceded by the singles "Savages", "Better", and "Legends". The album reached number 24 on the Billboard Heatseekers Albums chart in the United States. It was executive produced by Cyrus Saidi.

== Background ==
Following the cancellation of the release of Utopia as her second studio album instead of an EP, Kerli left Island Records and joined Ultra Music, where she released some songs as a featured artist. Kerli eventually left Ultra and decided to become an independent artist. During this time she released her third EP Deepest Roots. This EP was released only as limited signed CDs as she wanted to please the fans who had pledged for the project after its delay. Deepest Roots featured all the singles released so far from the project ("Feral Hearts", "Blossom" and "Diamond Hard") as well as remixes, audio commentaries and the instrumental track Journey Through the Elven Kingdom. The original version of the album was intended to be released around 2016-2017, but this version ended up being scrapped.

In 2018, she joined the label Seeking Blue, which ended up publishing the album. Kerli considers Shadow Works as her third studio album, as she also still considers Utopia as the second.

== Composition ==
Shadow Works is a relative return to Kerli's first album Love Is Dead and her EP Kerli, which has a gothic, deeply rock-inspired sound, however, the album features more electronic sounds, akin to her EP's Utopia and Deepest Roots.

Kerli described the album as “an exploration of (her) own shadow, it’s a collection of music designed to connect the listener to their own disowned parts and to honor their hidden self. I explore the feelings of victim-hood, co-dependence, lust, guilt and defeat. There are also frequencies that symbolize the eventual triumph over darkness. The vocal scapes that start, part and end the collection are designed to bring the listener into a meditative state so that Shadow Work can be performed.”

== Singles and promotion ==
The first single "Savages" was released on 30 November 2018 along the announcement and cover of the album. It reached the fourth position as one of the most successful songs of 2018 by Estonian artists on Raadio 2. The song's music video was released on Kerli's YouTube channel on 21 March 2019. The second single "Better" was released on 18 January 2019 and the third and final before the album's release, "Legends", on 8 February 2019. The day before its official released, the album was premiered via livestream on YouTube channel MrSuicideSheep.

A vinyl release of the album was announced in June of 2021 from Diggers Factory.

== Track listing ==
| No. | Title | Writer(s) | Producer(s) | Length |
|---|---|---|---|---|
| 1. | "Opening of the Way" (intro) | Kerli Kõiv | Kerli | 1:51 |
| 2. | "Mimicry" | Kõiv; Even Sarucco | EvenS | 4:34 |
| 3. | "Everybody Bleeds the Same" | Kõiv; Andrew Richard Burns | Crash Cove | 4:02 |
| 4. | "Savages" | Kõiv; David Dahlquist; Sarucco | Kill Dave | 3:11 |
| 5. | "One" | Kõiv; Ago Teppand; Afshin Salmani | Teppand; AFSHeeN | 3:20 |
| 6. | "Purification" (interlude) | Kõiv | Kerli | 1:04 |
| 7. | "Legends" | Kõiv; Marcello Pagin; Josh Cumbee; Salmani; Gennesse Lewis; Christian Buettner; Caitlin Morris | Cumbee; AFSHeeN | 2:58 |
| 8. | "Where the Dark Things Are" | Kõiv; Nicolas Karl Pittsinger | AFSHeeN; Varien | 3:40 |
| 9. | "Better" | Kõiv; Burns | Crash Cove | 3:44 |
| 10. | "Giving Up the Ghost" | Kõiv | Said the Sky | 4:12 |
| 11. | "Tuleloits / The Invocation of Fire" | Kõiv | Kerli | 6:08 |
| 12. | "Shadow Works" (outro) | Kõiv | Kerli | 3:43 |
| Total length: | | | | 42:32 |

== Charts ==
| Chart (2019) | Peak position |
|---|---|
| US Heatseekers Albums (Billboard) | 24 |

== Release history ==
List of release dates, showing region, edition(s), format(s), label(s) and reference(s)
| Region | Date | Format(s) | Label | Ref. |
|---|---|---|---|---|
| Various | 22 February 2019 | Digital download; streaming | Seeking Blue | |
| Various | 15 March 2019 | CD (limited edition) | Seeking Blue | |
| Estonia | 28 March 2019 | CD (limited edition) | Seeking Blue | |
