= Brian Malouf =

American music producer

- Born: Brian Malouf; September 8, 1955 (age 71); Hollywood, California; United States
- Genres: Rock; pop; R&B; soul; new wave; Country
- Occupations: Record producer; engineer; mixer; A&R; Dolby Atmos mixer
- Years active: 1981–present

Brian Malouf (born September 8, 1955) is an American producer, engineer, and mixer who has worked with acts such as Michael Jackson, Queen, Madonna, Pearl Jam, Stevie Wonder, Freya Skye, Dave Matthews Band, Doja Cat, Sabrina Carpenter, Laufey, All Time Low, Almost Monday, Kevin Abstract, and The Marías. Also serving as an executive at several major record labels over the years, his work has amassed a total of 53 gold, platinum, and double platinum records to date, along with 28 billion streams (and counting).

== Early life ==
Malouf grew up in Los Angeles, playing drums from a young age. In high school he experimented with instruments such as the trombone and upright bass, writing for the school's big band, but he returned to his percussive roots when he attended Cal State Northridge, where he was serving as the first-chair symphonic percussionist in the orchestra by the time he graduated. After his fifth year Malouf, weary of counting rests in the classical repertoire, left school and began playing drum set again in noted LA rock band Giant City. He later began doing sound engineering for live bands at night, and apprenticing for the late, great engineer/producer Dave Jerden during the day.

== Musical career ==
In 1981, Malouf went to work for Can-Am Recorders in Tarzana, California, where he'd been working for several years when he first met Michael Jackson. One day, while the Jacksons were recording there, Michael asked if Malouf would like to engineer for him that evening. Said Malouf to Mix Magazine: "He came to me on one of their sessions and said, 'Hey Brian, I want to come back tonight and do my own stuff. Can you do it with me?' And that was the beginning of working with him for a year and a half..." The songs they recorded together would eventually comprise the Bad album.

By 1990, Malouf had risen to the top of his field as a mix engineer, working with Madonna, Queen, Hall & Oates, and Smokey Robinson in the same year, and continuing to grow his high-profile clientele list. In 1994 he was offered the position of vice-president of A&R at RCA Records in New York, where he remained for eleven years while continuing to mix and produce. Working for various labels over the years as a consultant and senior A&R executive, including a four-year run as the VP of A&R at Walt Disney Records, he now owns Cookie Jar Recording in Sherman Oaks, California. He is managed by Bennett Kaufman at BK Entertainment.

== Selected discography ==
Year	Artist	Album	Label	Details
2026	Weezer	Pinkerton	Geffen (IGA Universal)	Immersive Mixer
2025	21 Savage	What Happened to the Streets?	Epic Records	Immersive Mixer
2025	Kaytranada	Timeless (LP)	Columbia Records	Immersive Mixer
2025	Malcom Todd	Eponymous	Columbia Records	Immersive Mixer
2024	ODESZA	The Last Goodbye LP	Ninja Tune	Immersive Mixer
2024	Mac Miller	Balloonerism LP/Film	Warner Records	Immersive Mixer
2024	Teddy Swims	Bad Dreams, Funeral	Warner Records	Immersive Mixer
2023	Benson Boone	Fireworks & Rollerblades LP	Warner Records	Immersive Mixer
2023	Weezer	The Blue Album	Geffen (IGA Universal)	Immersive Mixer
2023	Matchbox 20	Mad Season	Atlantic Records	Immersive Mixer
2023	Girl in Red	We Fell in Love in October	AWAL	Immersive Mixer
2022	Omar Apollo	Invincible	AWAL	Immersive Mixer
2022	The Head and the Heart	Every Shade of Blue	Warner Records	Immersive Mixer
2022	5 Seconds of Summer	2011	BMG	Immersive Mixer
2021	Regina Spektor	Home Before and After	Sire Records	Immersive Mixer
2021	Jessie Murph	Sobriety	Columbia Records	Immersive Mixer
2021	Leon Bridges	Purple Snowflake, Summer Rain	Columbia Records	Immersive Mixer
2021	Jagged Little Pill	Broadway Cast Album	Atlantic Records	Immersive Mixer
2018	Debbie Gibson	Legendary Freedom	Independent	Mixer
2017	Max and Harvey	Trade Hearts	Hollywood Records	Mixer
2016	Kerli	Shadow Works	Tiny Cute Monster	Mixer
2016	Waterparks	Double Dare	Equalvision Records	Mixer
2015	Allen Stone	Bear Creek Sessions	ATO Records	Mixer
2015	Sabrina Carpenter	Eyes Wide Open	Hollywood Records	Mixer
2014	Smokey Robinson	Smokey and Friends	Verve Records	Mixer
2014	Joel Crouse	Even the River Runs	Show Dog-Universal Music	Mixer
2014	Colbie Caillat	The Walking Dead Songs of Survival, Vol. 2: "The Way I Was"	Universal Republic Records	Mixer
2014	Sabrina Carpenter	Can't Blame a Girl for Trying (EP)	Hollywood Records	Producer, mixer
2014	The Strange Familiar	This is Gravity	Krian Music	Mixer
2014	Devour the Day	Time and Pressure	Fat Lady Music	Additional production, mix
2013	Caitlin Crosby	Save That Pillow	Anders Music Records	Mixer
2013	Big Time Rush	24/Seven	Columbia Records	Mixer
2013	Victoria Justice	"Ain't Nobody Else" (from upcoming album Shake)	Columbia Records	Mixer
2012	Barbra Streisand	Release Me	Columbia Records	Remixer; tape restoration
2012	Meiko	The Bright Side (various tracks)	Fantasy Records	Mixer
2012	Poema	Remembering You	Tooth & Nail Records	Mixer
2012	The Strange Familiar	Chasing Shadows	Krian Music Group	Producer, mixer, engineer, instrumentalist
2011	The Muppets	The Muppets [Original Soundtrack]	Disney Records	Mixer
2010	Wolfmother	Almost Alice (Alice in Wonderland soundtrack): "Fell Down a Hole"	Buena Vista Records	Mixer, exec producer
2010	All Time Low	Almost Alice (Alice in Wonderland soundtrack): "Painting Flowers"	Buena Vista Records	Mixer, exec producer
2010	Tokio Hotel w/ Kerli	Almost Alice (Alice in Wonderland soundtrack): "Strange"	Buena Vista Records	Mixer, exec producer
2010	The All-American Rejects	Almost Alice (Alice in Wonderland soundtrack): "The Poison"	Buena Vista Records	Mixer, exec producer
2010	Fefe Dobson	Joy: "More Than Words"	Island Def Jam	Mixer
2009	All Time Low	"Too Much"	Hopeless Records	Mixer
2009	Hannah Montana	Hannah Montana: The Movie [soundtrack]: "Let's Do This"	Disney Records	Mixer
2008	High School Musical 3	Original Soundtrack	Disney Records	Mixer
2008	O.A.R.	All Sides	Atlantic Records	Mixer
2008	Taproot	Our Long Road Home	Velvet Hammer	Mixer
2007	Dave Matthews/Tim Reynolds	Live at Radio City Music Hall	RCA Records	Mixer
2006	Dave Matthews Band	The Best of What's Around, Vol. 1	RCA Records	Live mixes
2006	Pussycat Dolls	Live in London DVD	A&M Records	Mixer
2006	Ziggy Marley	Love is My Religion (various tracks)	Tuff Gong	Mixer
2006	Michael Franti & Spearhead	Yell Fire! Live	Anti Records/Epitaph Records	Mixer
2005	Natasha Bedingfield	Peace of Me (single)	BMG	Mixer
2005	O.A.R.	Stories of a Stranger	Atlantic Records	Mixer
2005	Antigone Rising	Don't Look Back (EP)	Lava Records	Mixer
2002	The Calling	Sweet Home Alabama [soundtrack]: "Keep Your Hands to Yourself"	Hollywood Records	Mixer
2000	Live	The Dolphin's Cry (single)	Radioactive Records	Mixer
2000	David Gray	Babylon (single)	RCA	Remixer
1999	Lit	A Place in the Sun	RCA	Mixer
1999	Kid Rock	Bawitdaba (single)	Atlantic Records	Mixer
1998	Lisa Loeb & Nine Stories	Rugrats Soundtrack: "All Day"	Interscope	Mixer
1998	Ednaswap	Wonderland Park	Island Records	Mixer
1998	The Verve Pipe	Great Expectations [Original Soundtrack]: "Her Ornament"	Radioactive Records	Mixer, producer
1998	The Verve Pipe	The Freshman: "Spoonful of Sugar" (bonus track)	RCA	Mixer
1997	Sister Hazel	All For You (single)	Uptown/Universal Records	Mixer
1997	Eve 6	Eve 6: "Inside Out," "Leech," "Tongue-Tied"	RCA	Mixer, A&R
1996	3T ft Michael Jackson	Why: "Didn't Mean to Hurt You"	Epic Records	Mixer
1996	The Verve Pipe	Villains	RCA	A&R
1995	Everclear	Sparkle & Fade	Capitol Records	Mixer, producer
1995	Lisa Loeb & Nine Stories	Tails	Geffen	Mixer
1994	Oingo Boingo	Boingo: "Insanity"	Giant Records	Mixer
1994	Pearl Jam	Ten: "Even Flow"	Epic Records	Mixer
1994	Take 6 ft Stevie Wonder	Join the Band: "Why I Feel This Way"	Reprise Records	Engineer
1993	Celine Dion	The Colour of My Love: "Next Plane Out"	550 Records/Sony	Mixer
1993	Brian May	Driven By You (single)	Hollywood Records	Mixer
1992	Pearl Jam	Singles [Original Soundtrack]: "Breathe"	Epic Records	Mixer
1991	Queen	Jazz: "Fat-Bottomed Girls" (bonus remix)	Hollywood Records	Remixer
1991	Queen	Innuendo (US): "I Can't Live With You"	Hollywood Records	Remixer
1991	Seal	Seal: "Crazy" (single)	ZTT	Mixer
1991	Roxette	Joyride (Single)	EMI	Mixer
1991	Amy Grant	Heart in Motion (various tracks)	RCA	Mixer
1991	Natural Selection	Do Anything (single)	EastWest	Mixer
1990	Madonna	I'm Breathless - Music From and Inspired by the Film Dick Tracy	Sire, Warner Bros. Records	Mixer, engineer
1990	Hall & Oates	Change of Season: "Heavy Rain" (single)	Arista Records	Mixer
1990	Queen	Live at Wembley '86	Hollywood Records	Mixer
1990	Smokey Robinson	Love, Smokey: "Everything You Touch," "Take Me Through the Night"	Motown	Mixer
1990	Extreme	More Than Words (single)	A&M	Mixer
1987	Michael Jackson	Bad	Epic Records	Engineer
1987	Starship	No Protection (various tracks)	RCA	Mixer
1986	Wang Chung	Mosaic	Geffen Records	Mixer, engineer
1984	Starship	Youngblood soundtrack: "Cut You Down to Size"	RCA	Mixer
1984	Mickey Thomas	Youngblood soundtrack: "Stand in the Fire"	RCA	Mixer
