= Frankenweenie =

Frankenweenie may refer to:

- Frankenweenie (1984 film), a short live action film directed by Tim Burton
- Frankenweenie (2012 film), Burton's full-length stop motion remake
  - Frankenweenie (soundtrack), soundtrack album to the 2012 film
