= The Lucky Ones (song) =

2012 song by Kerli

Single by Kerli

from the album Utopia
- Released: October 29, 2012
- Recorded: 2012: Westlake Recording Studios, Los Angeles, California; Stockholm, Sweden
- Genre: Dance
- Length: 3:55
- Label: Island
- Songwriters: Kerli Kõiv; Svante Clas Halldin; Jakob Gustav Hazell
- Producer: SeventyEight

Kerli singles chronology
""Glow in the Dark"" (2012)	"The Lucky Ones" (2012)	"Something About You" (2013)

"The Lucky Ones" is a song by Estonian singer-songwriter Kerli from her second extended play, Utopia. Following the release of two promotional singles from the album ("Army of Love" in 2011 and "Zero Gravity" in 2012), it was announced by Universal Motown Records vice-president Chris Anokute that "The Lucky Ones" would serve as the first single from the extended play. It was written by Kerli, Svante Halldin and Jakob Hazell, while production was handled by the latter two as the production team SeventyEight and was released on October 29, 2012, through Island Records.

The song, a dance track, was written after Kerli's best friend's cancer diagnosis was reversed, which inspired its lyrics' message that encourages listeners to be thankful and "to never judge anybody because you don't know what's going on in their lives". Its accompanying music video, which amplifies this message, was released in December 2012.

It is Kerli's third song to enter the top ten on Billboard's Hot Dance Club Songs (all of which are from Utopia), peaking at number one.

== Background and release ==
In 2011 and 2012 Kerli released respectively two songs as promotional singles from her upcoming second studio album, Utopia: "Army of Love" and "Zero Gravity". "Zero Gravity" had been initially announced as the first official single from the album. In 2012, Kerli and Swedish production team SeventyEight, formed by Svante Halldin and Jakob Hazell, started working on songs for the album in the Westlake Recording Studios, Los Angeles, and in Stockholm, Sweden. Kerli noted that she felt comfortable working in the studio with the duo, who she mentioned as her "songwriting soul mates", adding that when they "[...] were in the studio together the energy was full of electricity." Their collaboration resulted in songs such as "The Lucky Ones". In August 2012, Universal Motown Records vice-president Chris Anokute announced through his Twitter account that a song titled "Lucky Ones" would serve as the lead single from the album.

Kerli spoke about the meaning of the song after a performance on Livestream Sessions in January 2013. Her best friend was informed of enigmatic lumps inside his body which were thought to be cancerous. On his first day of chemotherapy, his mother recovered old x-rays which showed that the lumps had always been present. The discovery came moments before treatment began and he was sent home. Kerli stated that she "always wanted to believe in miracles but that day [she] was really lucky to witness one" and that they had been "given a second chance". She began to pen "The Lucky Ones" immediately after.

On October 26, 2012, "The Lucky Ones" premiered on Perez Hilton's blog. Three days later, the song was made available for digital download through Island Records.

== Composition ==
"The Lucky Ones"
A 30-second sample of "The Lucky Ones" featuring the final chorus.

"The Lucky Ones" is a dance song. Its synthesizer influenced production contains trance-like beats. Kerli sings lines such as "And when the world is crumbling down/ I can make it better/ When you're lost, need to be found/ I will look forever", while in the chorus she sings "We are the lucky ones!"

== Music video ==
Kerli walks down the street running her hand against a wall which features posters that read "Join the Army of Love." Makeup artist Mynxii White said Kerli's appearance in the video was "acid, grunge, ... early 90s inspired".

The official music video for the song was premiered on December 5, 2012. It was directed by Brian Ziff and Ethan Chancer.

The video features Kerli dancing and walking down the streets of Los Angeles while singing the song. In between these scenes are three separate scenes depicting other people. The first scene shows a couple fighting in a club. The woman storms off and before walking into the pathway of an oncoming car, her boyfriend quickly pulls her back and they hug. The second scene shows a woman desolately staring out of a window as she plays with her hair, prescription pill bottles are shown in her room as well as a man asleep in her bed. She returns to bed before the man affectionately places his hand on her face and removes her wig. The third scene shows a couple arguing as a child sits in front of them watching. He leaves the room to put on a cape and exits the building. On the rooftop, apparently preparing to jump, the couple races behind him to save him.

In a press release, Kerli stated that "some of the more important messages in the video are having less judgment as we simply don't know other people's stories and being precious about the time we get to spend with the people we love and time in general", and that she wanted to give her fans "something more gritty and real this time that hopefully inspires them the way they have inspired" her.

== Chart performance ==
On the issue dated December 8, 2012, "The Lucky Ones" debuted at number forty-one on the US Billboard's Hot Dance Club Songs. In its eighth week on the chart, the song jumped from number 7 to number 5, giving Kerli her third top ten hit on the chart and her second top five song. The single would reach number one in the February 16, 2013, issue, giving Kerli her second number-one single on this chart. In its thirteenth and fourteenth weeks, the song fell to number 11 and then 12, respectively, making this Kerli's longest charting single on the chart.

== Track listing ==
- Digital download
1. "The Lucky Ones" – 3:55
- Remix EP
1. "The Lucky Ones" (Morgan Page Extended Club) – 5:35
2. "The Lucky Ones" (Morgan Page Instrumental) – 5:34
3. "The Lucky Ones" (Rich Morel's Hot Sauce Mix) – 7:24
4. "The Lucky Ones" (Rich Morel's Hot Sauce Dub) – 7:03
5. "The Lucky Ones" (Hector Fonseca Club Mix) – 7:01
6. "The Lucky Ones" (Hector Fonseca & Tommy Love Tribal Dub) – 6:07
7. "The Lucky Ones" (Syn Cole Vs. Kerli Club) – 6:21
8. "The Lucky Ones" (Syn Cole Vs. Kerli Dub) – 6:20
9. "The Lucky Ones" (tyDi Remix) – 5:48
10. "The Lucky Ones" (tyDi Dub) – 5:47
11. "The Lucky Ones" (Cole Plante Extended Remix) – 5:52
12. "The Lucky Ones" (Oliver Twizt Remix) – 5:23

== Charts ==
=== Weekly charts ===
Chart (2012–13)	Peak position
US Dance Club Songs (Billboard)	1
US Hot Dance/Electronic Songs (Billboard)	12

=== Year-end charts ===
Chart (2013)	Position
US Dance Club Songs (Billboard)	21
US Hot Dance/Electronic Songs (Billboard)	83

== Release history ==
Region	Date	Format	Label
Canada	October 29, 2012	Digital download	Island Records
Mexico	October 29, 2012	Digital download	Island Records
United States	October 29, 2012	Digital download	Island Records
Germany	November 5, 2012	Digital download	Island Records
United Kingdom	November 5, 2012	Digital download	Island Records
United States	December 4, 2012	Digital download: remixes	Island Records

== See also ==
- List of number-one dance singles of 2013 (U.S.)
