= Men in Black 3 (soundtrack) =

2012 film score by Danny Elfman

Men in Black 3 (Original Motion Picture Soundtrack) (Note: also marketed and released as MIB³ (Original Motion Picture Soundtrack))

Soundtrack album by Danny Elfman
- Released: May 29, 2012
- Recorded: 2012
- Studios: Sony Scoring Stage, Sony Pictures Studios, Culver City, California; Studio Della Morte, Los Angeles, California
- Genre: Film score
- Length: 53:38
- Label: Sony Classical
- Producers: Danny Elfman; Steve Bartek; Bill Abbott

Danny Elfman chronology
Dark Shadows (2012)	Men in Black 3 (Original Motion Picture Soundtrack) (2012)	Frankenweenie (2012)

Men in Black 3 (Original Motion Picture Soundtrack) is the score soundtrack to the 2012 film Men in Black 3, the third film in the Men in Black franchise and a sequel to Men in Black II (2002), starring Will Smith, Tommy Lee Jones and Josh Brolin. The film's musical score is composed by Danny Elfman and released through Sony Classical Records on May 29, 2012, four days after the film.

== Background ==
As with the previous instalments, Danny Elfman composed the score for Men in Black 3. Elfman utilized the musical ideas from the predecessors and used predominantly orchestral elements in the score, which was being transitioned to electronic and rock music along with the choir elements being provided in the finale. The score was recorded at Sony Scoring Stage and Elfman's Studio Della Morte. Sony Classical Records released the film's soundtrack consisting of Elfman's score, on May 29 in CDs.

== Critical reception ==
A reviewer from Filmtracks.com wrote "The element of humor is restrained, but the better developed orchestral bravado of the franchise themes and the loyalty to them add up to a pleasantly satisfying whole." A. O. Scott of The New York Times criticized the score, summarizing "The music sounds less like a score by Danny Elfman than like a score by Danny Elfman’s smartphone app, and it carries dreadful intimations of forced fun." Drew Taylor of IndieWire wrote "Danny Elfman's groovy galactic score, makes for a pretty intoxicating experience." A review from The Hollywood Reporter summarized "Danny Elfman's score, continue the winning look and feel established in the first film."

== Track listing ==
All music is composed by Danny Elfman.

Men in Black 3 (Original Motion Picture Soundtrack) track listing
No.	Title	Length
1.	"Men in Black 3 – Main Titles"	5:54
2.	"Spiky Bulba"	2:17
3.	"The Set-Up"	3:35
4.	"Headquarters"	1:59
5.	"Regret"	3:03
6.	"Wrong"	1:02
7.	"Not Funny"	1:48
8.	"Big Trouble"	1:14
9.	"Out on a Limb"	2:00
10.	"Time Jump"	1:14
11.	"Bad Fortune"	1:14
12.	"Forget Me Not"	1:27
13.	"Into the Past"	1:37
14.	"Griffin Steps Up"	1:40
15.	"True Story"	0:41
16.	"The Prize – Monocycles"	3:56
17.	"Boris Meets Boris"	1:26
18.	"Under the Bridge"	5:51
19.	"The Mission Begins"	5:27
20.	"Mission Accomplished"	3:07
21.	"A Close One"	1:33
22.	"Men in Black 3 – Main Title Revisited"	1:33

== Personnel ==
Credits adapted from liner notes.

- Music – Danny Elfman
- Score producer – Danny Elfman, Steve Bartek
- Album producer – Bill Abbott
- Engineer – Greg Maloney
- Arrangements – Edward Shearmur, T. J. Lindgren
- Recording – Noah Snyder, Dennis Sands, Shawn Murphy
- Mixing – Dennis Sands, Shawn Murphy
- Mastering – Patricia Sullivan

Orchestra

- Orchestration – David Slonaker, Edgardo Simone, Steve Bartek
- Conductor – Pete Anthony
- Orchestra contractor – Gina Zimmitti
- Scoring crew – Adam Michalak, David Marquette, Greg Loskorn, Mark Eshelman

Vocals

- Vocal contractor – Bobbi Page
- Alto – Amy Fogerson, Baraka May Williams, Clydene Jackson, Debbie Hall Gleason, Donna Medine, Julie Minasian, Karen Harper, Kate Reid, Leanna Brand, Luana Jackman, Melissa Mackay, Sandy Howell
- Baritone and bass – Bob Joyce, Guy Maeda, Michael Geiger, Randy Crenshaw, Rick Logan, Ryan Alvarez
- Soprano – Beth Andersen, Bobbi Page, Christine Guter, Diane Reynolds, Elin Carlson, Joanna Bushnell, Karen Schnurr, Kimberly Lingo Hinze, Sandie Hall, Susie Stevens, Suzanne Waters, Teri Koide
- Tenor – Amick Byram, Antonio Sol, Dick Wells, Gerald White, Scott Oatley, Walt Harrah

Instruments

- Acoustic guitar – George Doering
- Bass – Bruce Morgenthaler, Chris Kollgaard, Drew Dembowski, Ed Meares, Nico Abondolo, Oscar Hidalgo, Steve Dress, Sue Ranney
- Bassoon – Damian Montano, John Steinmetz, Ken Munday, Rose Corrigan
- Cello – Andrew Shulman, Tony Cooke, Armen Ksajikian, Cecilia Tsan, Dennis Karmazyn, Erika Duke, Giovanna Clayton, Paul Cohen, Steve Erdody, Steve Richards, Tim Landauer, Trevor Handy
- Clarinet – Don Foster, Gary Bovyer, Ralph Williams, Stuart Clark
- Drums – Joey Waronker, Josh Freese
- Electric bass – Chris Chaney, Gus Seyffert
- Electric guitar – Lyle Workman, Michael Ripoll
- Flute – Dan Higgins, Heather Clark, Jenni Olson
- French horn – Daniel Kelley, Dylan Hart, Jenny Kim, Joe Meyer, Mark Adams, Nathan Campbell, Phil Yao, Steve Becknell
- Harp – Katie Kirkpatrick, Marcia Dickstein
- Oboe – Leslie Reed, Phil Ayling
- Percussion – Bob Zimmitti, Dan Greco, Don Williams, Emil Richards, Michael Fisher
- Piano – Randy Kerber
- Timpani – Peter Limonick
- Trombone – Alex Iles, Bill Reichenbach, Charlie Loper, Phil Teele
- Trumpet – Barry Perkins, Jon Lewis, Marissa Benedict, Rick Baptist
- Tuba – Doug Tornquist
- Viola – Alma Fernandez, Andrew Duckles, Brian Dembow, Darren McCann, David Walther, Keith Greene, Matt Funes, Rob Brophy, Roland Kato, Shawn Mann, Thomas Diener, Vicki Miskolczy
- Violin – Alyssa Park, Bruce Dukov, Carol Pool, Darius Campo, Jackie Brand, Joel Derouin, Josefina Vergara, Julie Gigante, Julie Rogers, Katie Sloan, Katia Popov, Lily Ho Chen, Marc Sazer, Natalie Leggett, Neel Hammond, Nina Evtuhov, Phil Levy, Richard Altenbach, Roberto Cani, Roger Wilkie, Sara Parkins, Sarah Thornblade, Shalini Vijayan, Sid Page, Tammy Hatwan, Tereza Stanislav

== Accolades ==
Accolades for Men in Black 3 (Original Motion Picture Soundtrack)
Award	Date of ceremony	Category	Result	Ref(s)
International Film Music Critics Association	February 21, 2013	Film Composer of the Year	Won (Note: also for Dark Shadows, Frankenweenie, Men in Black 3, Silver Linings Playbook and Promised Land)	
