= Utopia (EP) =

2013 EP by Kerli

EP by Kerli
- Released: 19 March 2013
- Genres: EDM; pop
- Length: 24:21
- Label: Island Def Jam
- Producers: Kerli; SeventyEight; Switch; Brian Ziff; Uma Makesh

Kerli chronology
Love Is Dead (2008)	Utopia (2013)	Deepest Roots (2016)

Singles from Utopia
- 1. "The Lucky Ones" Released: 29 October 2012; 2. "Love Me or Leave Me" Released: 5 March 2013

Utopia is the second extended play (EP) by Estonian recording artist and songwriter Kerli. It was released on 19 March 2013 by The Island Def Jam Music Group. The album was produced in the five years following the release of Kerli's debut album Love Is Dead (2008) and was originally intended as Kerli's second studio album.

The songs from the EP feature an overall positive message and a heavily electronic dance-influenced sound (a stark contrast from Love Is Dead) and feature production by Swedish production duo SeventyEight as well as English producer and DJ Switch.

Two songs that were written for the album, "Army of Love" and "Zero Gravity", were released as buzz singles in 2011 and 2012 respectively prior to release of the EP's lead single in 2013 titled "The Lucky Ones". Two other songs intended for the album (which were written by Kerli, Toby Gad, and Lindy Robbins) titled "I Feel Immortal" and "Skyscraper" were recorded by artists Tarja Turunen and Demi Lovato for their albums What Lies Beneath (2010) and Unbroken (2011) respectively, the latter song peaking at number ten on the Billboard Hot 100.

Although Kerli's version of "Skyscraper" was never officially released, her version of "I Feel Immortal" titled "Immortal" was released on Frankenweenie Unleashed! in 2012 and the demo version of "Skyscraper" sung by Kerli leaked online the same year. "Zero Gravity", "Army of Love", and "The Lucky Ones" all charted in the top ten of Billboard's Hot Dance Club Songs chart, the last two peaking at number one. Utopia peaked at number 196 on the Billboard 200 for the week of 6 April.

== Background ==
In describing Utopia, Kerli said it was "about [her] search for love and happiness" and that she underwent a "huge transformation personally" while writing it. She also noted the contrast between Love Is Dead's darker, more rock-influenced sound and Utopia's more uplifting and electronic dance-influenced sound, which she analogized as "sweaty angels raving in the desert."

== Composition ==
According to Kerli, the first track of the album, "Can't Control the Kids", is about "the power that kids these days have because of technology and internet" and that "everyone with a laptop can make something amazing and share it with the rest of the world. Everyone can have a voice" and that it was that "kind of rebellious and badass energy [she] was trying to channel." The following song, "The Lucky Ones", was written after a friend's cancer scare after which she said they had been "given a second chance". Both of these tracks are electronic dance medleys produced by Svante Halldin and Jakob Hazell (SeventyEight), the following track, also produced by SeventyEight, is the piano-driven ballad "Love Me or Leave Me", which Kerli released as the iTunes Store's "countdown single" on March 5. The next track, "Sugar", is a simple electronic track with acoustic elements produced by English producer and DJ Switch characterized by breathy vocals and repeated moaning from Kerli. "Here and Now", the following track, is another EDM song produced by SeventyEight, and features a more progressive house influence. The album's final track, "Chemical", is a softer piano ballad written solely by Kerli and produced by Brian Ziff.

== Artwork ==
The artwork for the EP was designed by photographer Brian Ziff and artist Natalia Shau, who designed the artwork for Kerli's debut studio album Love Is Dead (2008). The artwork displays Kerli wearing a white, short dress, with a blue background. The singer holds a bottle in her right hand. Behind her, there is a structure, decorated with dragons and curved lines, and surrounded by a white light.

== Promotion ==
Promotion for Utopia was limited; it began with a club tour where the album's lead single "The Lucky Ones" and the previous promotional singles "Zero Gravity" and "Army of Love" were performed. Kerli made her American television debut on 17 April 2013 on Dancing with the Stars; Vibe called the performance a "major milestone in the [electronic dance music] world."

== Critical reception ==
Professional ratings
Review scores
Source	Rating
AllMusic	3.5/5 stars

David Jeffries of AllMusic wrote that "perhaps the extra material would help explain the dance diva's evolution from gothic to grand dame, but she's just as persuasive here with this more positive material, especially during the you-only-live-once dance anthem 'The Lucky Ones'."

== Track listing ==
No.	Title	Writer(s)	Producer(s)	Length
1.	"Can't Control the Kids"	Kerli Kõiv; Svante Halldin; Jakob Hazell	SeventyEight	3:08
2.	"The Lucky Ones"	Kõiv; Halldin; Hazell	SeventyEight	3:54
3.	"Love Me or Leave Me"	Kõiv; Halldin; Hazell	SeventyEight	4:10
4.	"Sugar"	Kõiv; Dave Taylor; Danny Taylor	Switch	3:26
5.	"Here and Now"	Kõiv; Halldin; Hazell	SeventyEight	3:49
6.	"Chemical"	Kõiv; Brian Ziff; Uma Makesh	Ziff	2:47
7.	"The Lucky Ones" (Syn Cole Remix)	Kõiv; Halldin; Hazell	SeventyEight; Syn Cole	3:07
Total length:				24:21

== Awards and nominations ==
Year	Nominee / work	Award	Result
2014	Utopia	Estonian Music Award for Best Female Album	Nominated
2014	Utopia	Estonian Music Award for Best Pop Album	Nominated

== Personnel ==
Credits adapted from the Utopia liner notes.

- Kerli – background and lead vocals, songwriter (1,2,3,4,5,6), producer (6)
- Carl Bagge – string arranger (3)
- Claudia Bonfiglioli – strings (3)
- Erik Holm – strings (3)
- Tomas Lundström – strings (3)
- SeventyEight – drums, keyboards, songwriter, producer (1,2,3,5)
- Switch – mixer, producer, songwriter (4)
- Fredrik Syberg – strings (3)
- Phil Tan – mixer (1,2,3,5)
- Danny Taylor – songwriter (4)
- Brian Ziff – keyboards, producer (6)

== Charts ==
Chart performance for Utopia
Chart (2013)	Peak position
US Billboard 200	196
US Top Dance Albums (Billboard)	9
US Heatseekers Albums (Billboard)	7
