= Nashville Pride =

Annual LGBT event in Nashville, Tennessee

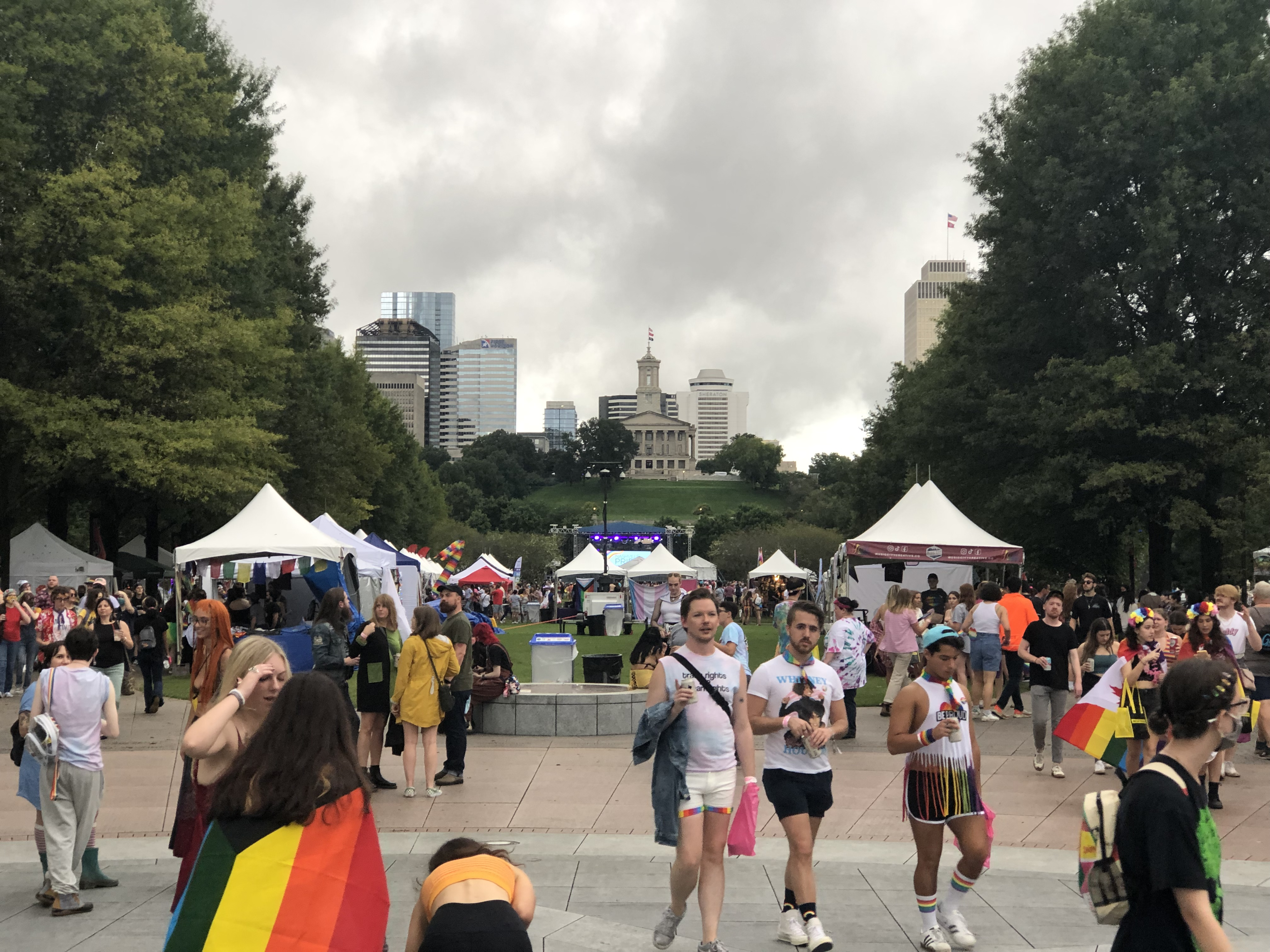
- Nashville Pride Festival in September 2021
- Status: Active
- Genre: Pride parade
- Inaugurated: June 1988
- Website: nashvillepride.org

Nashville Pride is a non-profit based in Nashville, Tennessee that produces a yearly LGBT Pride Festival. Its goal is to celebrate the existence and identity of the LGBT community and "connect people with the services and resources that they need in order to thrive" according to Nashville Pride's Community Affairs Director Phil Cobucci. It is the largest LGBT event based in Tennessee.

== History ==
The first Nashville pride parade took place in June 1988 with help from the National Gay and Lesbian Task Force; about 250 people marched from Fannie Mae Dees Park to Centennial Park. National attention was garnered by the festival in 2010 when headlining entertainer, Vanessa Carlton, came out to the attendees; she began her set by saying "I've never said this before, but I am a proud bisexual woman." The 2015 festival drew an estimated 15,000–20,000 people, making it the largest gathering since the event began. Records continued to be shattered in subsequent years and the 2018 Nashville Pride festival boasted 35,000 attendees over a two-day period, with nearly 8,000 marching in the Equality Walk. The 2019 festival drew a record crowd of over 75,000 people for two days of planned events.

The festival and march were canceled in 2020 and delayed in 2021 in response to the COVID-19 pandemic; the delayed festival, held in September 2021, required COVID-19 vaccinations or a negative test result but nonetheless gathered thousands of attendees and around 100 booths operated by LBGT-supporting businesses and nonprofits. However, due to heavy rain at the Bicentennial Mall venue, the festival was reduced to a one-day event. The festival was held two weeks after a same-sex couple was denied a tour of a wedding venue in Nashville, which Nashville Pride's Phil Cobucci labeled a discriminatory act.

== See also ==
- Pride parade
