= Spirit Animal (song) =

2016 song by Kerli

Single by Kerli
- Released: December 19, 2016
- Recorded: 2016
- Genre: Electro-folk
- Length: 3:21
- Label: Tiny Cute Monster
- Songwriter: Kerli Kõiv
- Producers: Kerli; Brian Ziff

Kerli singles chronology
"Diamond Hard" (2016)	"Spirit Animal" (2016)	"Sound of Walking Away" (2017)

"Spirit Animal" is a song performed by Estonian singer Kerli. It was released as a standalone single on December 19, 2016, prior to being performed at Eesti Laul 2017, Estonia's pre-selection for the Eurovision Song Contest 2017.

== Background and promotion ==
On November 8, 2016, it was revealed that Kerli would participate in Eesti Laul 2017 contest with a brand new song titled "Spirit Animal". In December, the song was released for free download on December 15 and for digital purchase on December 19. Kerli performed the song in the contest, and was a favourite to win. Kerli reached the Eesti Laul final, in which the song obtained second place, failing to win Estonia's ticket to Kyiv. This marks the second time Kerli has been runner up in Estonia's pre-selection, losing out in Eurolaul 2004 to Neiokõsõ. After the competition, the singer uploaded a vlog in her YouTube official account, stating that there would be no music video for the song, since the performances were very expensive to make and costed a lot.

== Composition ==
"Spirit Animal" is set at a 4/4 time signature, and runs at a moderate tempo of 89 beats per minute during the verses, and then shifting to 91 beats per minute during the choruses. The instrumentation is based in drums and synths. Lyrically, Kerli stated about the song that she "wanted to create a world. It’s more like a journey. You enter this journey and you start walking and all these animals appear and these colours and shapes. The twin flames are like finding your true soulmate".

== Track listing ==
=== Digital download ===
1. "Spirit Animal" 3:21
