= Jack & Coke (songwriters) =

Swedish production and songwriting team

- Origin: Stockholm, Sweden
- Years active: 2010–present
- Members: Svante Halldin; Jakob Hazell

Jack & Coke (formerly known as SeventyEight) is a Swedish production and songwriting team consisting of Svante Halldin and Jakob Hazell. They have produced and written songs for artists such as Rita Ora, Charli XCX, Tove Lo, Nick Jonas and Hayley Kiyoko. Both "Find You" by Jonas and "Curious" by Kiyoko placed on Top 40 hits on US radio. They have also co-produced the Eurovision Song Contest-winning song "Euphoria" by Loreen which is the most sold and played Eurovision song in history.

== Songwriting and production credits ==
Title	Year	Artist(s)	Album	Contributing Member(s)	Credits	Written with	Produced with
"Starstruck"	2010	Christopher Wilde	Starstuck: OST	Jakob Hazell	Co-writer	Teddy Sky, Joacim Persson, Niclas Molinder	-
"Kiss It Goodbye"	2010	Miley Cyrus	Hannah Montana Forever	Jakob Hazell	Co-writer/ Producer	Christoffer Wikberg, Charlie Masson, Joacim Persson, Niclas Molinder	-
"Zero Gravity"	2012	Kerli	Non-album single	Jakob Hazell, Svante Halldin	Co-writer/ Producer	Kerli Kõiv	-
"The Lucky Ones"	2012	Kerli	Utopia EP	Jakob Hazell, Svante Halldin	Co-writer/ Producer	Kerli Kõiv	-
"Euphoria"	2012	Loreen	Heal	Jakob Hazell, Svante Halldin	Co-producer	-	Peter Boström
"Crying Out Your Name"	2012	Loreen	Heal	Jakob Hazell, Svante Halldin	Co-writer/ Producer	Ana Diaz, Gino Yonan, Moh Denebi, Niklas Jarl	-
"Stardust" (featuring Kerli)	2013	TyDi	Non-album single	Jakob Hazell, Svante Halldin	Co-writer	Kerli Kõiv	-
"Heartquake"	2013	Mads Langer	In These Waters	Jakob Hazell, Svante Halldin	Producer	-	Mads Langer
"Glass House"	2013	Mads Langer	In These Waters	Jakob Hazell, Svante Halldin	Co-writer/ Producer	Mads Langer	Mads Langer
"Elephant"	2013	Mads Langer	In These Waters	Jakob Hazell, Svante Halldin	Co-writer/ Producer	Mads Langer	Mads Langer
"No Gravity"	2013	Mads Langer	In These Waters	Jakob Hazell, Svante Halldin	Co-writer/ Producer	Mads Langer	Mads Langer
"Dire Straits"	2013	Mads Langer	In These Waters	Jakob Hazell, Svante Halldin	Co-writer/ Producer	Mads Langer	Mads Langer
"Never Forget You"	2013	Mads Langer	In These Waters	Jakob Hazell, Svante Halldin	Co-writer/ Producer	Mads Langer	Mads Langer
"Not Meant To Be Broken"	2013	Mads Langer	In These Waters	Jakob Hazell, Svante Halldin	Co-writer/ Producer	Mads Langer	Mads Langer
"Ghost Town"	2013	Mads Langer	In These Waters	Jakob Hazell, Svante Halldin	Co-writer/ Producer	Mads Langer	Mads Langer
"In These Waters"	2013	Mads Langer	In These Waters	Jakob Hazell, Svante Halldin	Co-writer/ Producer	Mads Langer	Mads Langer
"Satellites"	2013	Mads Langer	In These Waters	Jakob Hazell, Svante Halldin	Co-writer/ Producer	Mads Langer	Mads Langer
"When Silence Falls"	2013	Mads Langer	In These Waters	Jakob Hazell, Svante Halldin	Co-writer/ Producer	Mads Langer	Mads Langer
"Can't Control the Kids"	2013	Kerli	Utopia EP	Jakob Hazell, Svante Halldin	Co-writer/ Producer	Kerli Kõiv	-
"Love Me or Leave Me"	2013	Kerli	Utopia EP	Jakob Hazell, Svante Halldin	Co-writer/ Producer	Kerli Kõiv	-
"Here and Now"	2013	Kerli	Utopia EP	Jakob Hazell, Svante Halldin	Co-writer/ Producer	Kerli Kõiv	-
"Honest"	2016	JoJo	Mad Love	Jakob Hazell, Svante Halldin	Co-writer/ Producer	Joanna Lovesque, Hayley Warner, Jason Dean, Joseph Kirkland	-
"Rise Up"	2016	JoJo	Mad Love	Jakob Hazell, Svante Halldin	Co-writer/ Producer	Joanna Lovesque, Hayley Warner, Jason Dean, Joseph Kirkland	-
"Perfect Day"	2017	Oh My Girl	Coloring Book	Jakob Hazell, Svante Halldin	Co-writer/ Producer	MaFly, KeyFly, Andreas Öberg, Hugo Bjork, Michael Lerios, Demitri Lerios, SYMON	Hugo Bjork
"Life of the Party"	2017	All Time Low	Last Young Renegade	Jakob Hazell, Svante Halldin	Co-writer/ Producer	Alexander Gaskarth, Kevin Fisher	Blake Harnage, Colin Brittain
"Dark Side of Your Room"	2017	All Time Low	Last Young Renegade	Jakob Hazell, Svante Halldin	Co-writer/ Producer	Alexander Gaskarth	Blake Harnage, Colin Brittain
"Same to You"	2017	The Vamps	Night & Day: Night; Edition	Jakob Hazell, Svante Halldin	Co-writer/ Producer	Brad Simpson, James McVey, Connor Ball, Tristan Evans	-
"Paper Hearts"	2017	The Vamps	Night & Day: Night; Edition	Jakob Hazell, Svante Halldin	Producer	-	Andrew Bolooki
"Find You"	2017	Nick Jonas	TBA	Jakob Hazell, Svante Halldin	Co-writer/ Producer	Nicholas Jonas, Simon Wilcox	-
"Shivering Gold"	2017	Tove Lo	Blue Lips	Jakob Hazell, Svante Halldin	Producer	-	Ludvig Soderberg
"Curious"	2018	Hayley Kiyoko	Expectations	Jakob Hazell, Svante Halldin	Co-writer/ Producer	Hayley Alcroft, Lisa Vitale, Brandon Colbein	Jono Dorr
"Focus"	2018	Charli XCX	Non-album single	Jakob Hazell, Svante Halldin	Co-writer/ Producer	Charlotte Aitchison, Alexander Guy Cook	A. G. Cook
"Pictures of Us"	2018	The Vamps	Night & Day: Day; Edition	Jakob Hazell, Svante Halldin	Co-writer/ Producer	Alexandra Hughes, Ammar Malik, Jacob Kasher Hindlin, Phil Shaouy	-
"Hopeful"	2018	AJ Mitchell	Hopeful EP	Jakob Hazell, Svante Halldin	Co-writer/ Producer	Aaron Mitchell, Michael Pollack	-
"Been There Done That" (featuring Tove Styrke)	2018	NOTD	TBA	Jakob Hazell, Svante Halldin	Co-writer	Magnus Danielsson, Samuel Brandt, Tove Styrke, Kennedi Lykken	-
"New Look"	2018	Rita Ora	Phoenix	Jakob Hazell, Svante Halldin	Co-writer/ Producer	Jonnali Parmenius, Ilsey Juber, Jordan Suecof	-
"Why Do You Believe Me"	2019	Broods	Don't Feed the Pop Monster	Jakob Hazell, Svante Halldin	Co-writer/ Producer	Georgia Nott, Caleb Nott	-
"Someone New"	2019	Astrid S	TBA	Jakob Hazell, Svante Halldin	Co-writer/ Producer	Jonnali Parmenius, Astrid Smeplass, Charlotte Aitchison	-
"Years"	2019	Astrid S	Down Low	Jakob Hazell, Svante Halldin	Co-writer/ Producer	Astrid Smeplass, Tia Scola	-
"Sweettalk My Heart"	2019	Tove Lo	Sunshine Kitty	Jakob Hazell, Svante Halldin	Co-writer/ Co-producer	Ebba Nilsson, Ludvig Soderberg	A Strut
"Shifted"	2019	Tove Lo	Sunshine Kitty	Jakob Hazell, Svante Halldin	Co-writer/ Co-producer	Ebba Nilsson, Ludvig Soderberg	A Strut
"Anywhere U Go"	2019	Tove Lo	Sunshine Kitty	Jakob Hazell, Svante Halldin	Co-writer/ Co-producer	Ebba Nilsson, Ludvig Soderberg	A Strut
"Stay Over"	2019	Tove Lo	Sunshine Kitty	Jakob Hazell, Svante Halldin	Co-producer	Ebba Nilsson, Ludvig Soderberg, Jakob Jerstrom	A Strut
"Come Undone"	2019	Tove Lo	Sunshine Kitty	Jakob Hazell, Svante Halldin	Co-producer	Ebba Nilsson, Ludvig Soderberg, Jakob Jerstrom	A Strut
"Baggage" (with AlunaGeorge)	2019	Gryffin, Gorgon City	Gravity	Jakob Hazell, Svante Halldin	Co-writer/ Co-producer	Aluna Francis, Daniel Griffith, Ilsey Juber, Noonie Bao	Gryffin, Gorgon City, Dilby
"Bikini Porn"	2020	Tove Lo	Bikini Porn	Jakob Hazell, Svante Halldin	Co-writer/ Co-producer	Ebba Nilsson, Finneas O'Connell, Ludvig Söderberg	A Strut, Finneas
"I Do"	2020	Astrid S, Brett Young	I Do	Jakob Hazell, Svante Halldin	Co-writer/ Producer	Astrid Smeplass, Julia Karlsson, Tia Scola	-
"Felt This Way"	2020	Carly Rae Jepsen	Dedicated Side B	Jakob Hazell, Svante Halldin	Co-writer	Carly Rae Jepsen, John Hill, Jordan Palmer, Tavish Crowe	-
"Stay Away"	2020	Carly Rae Jepsen	Dedicated Side B	Jakob Hazell, Svante Halldin	Co-writer/ Producer	Carly Rae Jepsen, Tavish Crowe	-
"Dance Dance Dance"	2020	Astrid S	Dance Dance Dance	Jakob Hazell, Svante Halldin	Co-writer/ Co-producer	Astrid Smeplass, Litens Anton Nilsson	Astrid S
"Marilyn Monroe"	2020	Astrid S	Marilyn Monroe: Single	Jakob Hazell, Svante Halldin	Co-writer/ Co-producer	Astrid Smeplass, Eyelar Mirzazadeh, Fred Ball, Frederik Castenschiold Eichen	Fred Ball
"Can't Forget"	2020	Astrid S	Leave it Beautiful	Jakob Hazell, Svante Halldin	Co-writer/ Co-producer	Astrid Smeplass, Boy Matthews	Astrid S
"Hits Different"	2020	Astrid S	Leave it Beautiful	Jakob Hazell, Svante Halldin	Co-writer/ Co-producer	Astrid Smeplass, Tia Scola	Astrid S
"It's OK If You Forget Me"	2020	Astrid S	Leave it Beautiful	Jakob Hazell, Svante Halldin	Co-writer/ Co-producer	Astrid Smeplass, Caroline Pennell	Astrid S
"Airpods"	2020	Astrid S	Leave it Beautiful	Jakob Hazell, Svante Halldin	Co-writer/ Co-producer	Amy Wadge, Astrid Smeplass	Astrid S
"Good Choices"	2020	Astrid S	Leave it Beautiful	Jakob Hazell, Svante Halldin	Co-producer	Astrid Smeplass, Caroline Ailin, The 23rd	Astrid S
"Obsessed"	2020	Astrid S	Leave it Beautiful	Jakob Hazell, Svante Halldin	Co-writer/ Co-producer	Astrid Smeplass	Astrid S
"If I Can't Have You"	2020	Astrid S	Leave it Beautiful	Jakob Hazell, Svante Halldin	Co-writer/ Co-producer	Astrid Smeplass, Maria Hazell	Astrid S
"Leave It Beautiful"	2020	Astrid S	Leave it Beautiful	Jakob Hazell, Svante Halldin	Co-writer/ Co-producer	Emily Warren, Astrid Smeplass, Ludvig Söderberg	A Strut
"First Time"	2020	Daya	TBA	Jakob Hazell, Svante Halldin	Writer/ Producer	Grace Tandon, Shy Martin	-
"Better"	2020	The Vamps	Cherry Blossom	Jakob Hazell, Svante Halldin	Co-writer/ Co-producer	Bradley Simpson, Peter Rycroft	Lostboy
"Limited Edition"	2022	Nina Nesbitt	Älskar	Jakob Hazell, Svante Halldin	Co-writer/producer	Nina Nesbitt	-
"Kamikaze"	2023	Carly Rae Jepsen	The Loveliest Time	Jakob Hazell, Svante Halldin	Co-writer/producer	Carly Rae Jepsen	
"More Then This Was"	2024	Zara Larsson	Venus	Both	Co-writer/producer	Zara Larsson, Danja, Amanda Ibanez	Danja
"Optimist"	2024	Crash Adams	TBA	Both	Songwriter and Producer		
"Call It Love"	2024	Picture This	TBA	Both	Producer		
"Purple Irises"	2024	Gwen Stefani	Bouquet	Both	Songwriter		
"Marigolds"	2024	Gwen Stefani	Bouquet	Both	Songwriter		
"Girls Will B Girls"	2025	Natalie Jane	TBA	Both	Songwriter and Producer		
"My House"	2025	Alessia Cara	Nobody Wants This Season 2: The Soundtrack	Both	Songwriter		
"Love Depressed"	2026	Carly Rae Jepsen	Day and Night	Both	Songwriter and Producer	Carly Rae Jepsen, Annie Schindel	Kyle Shearer, Billboard
