= Kerli =

Estonian musician (born 1987)

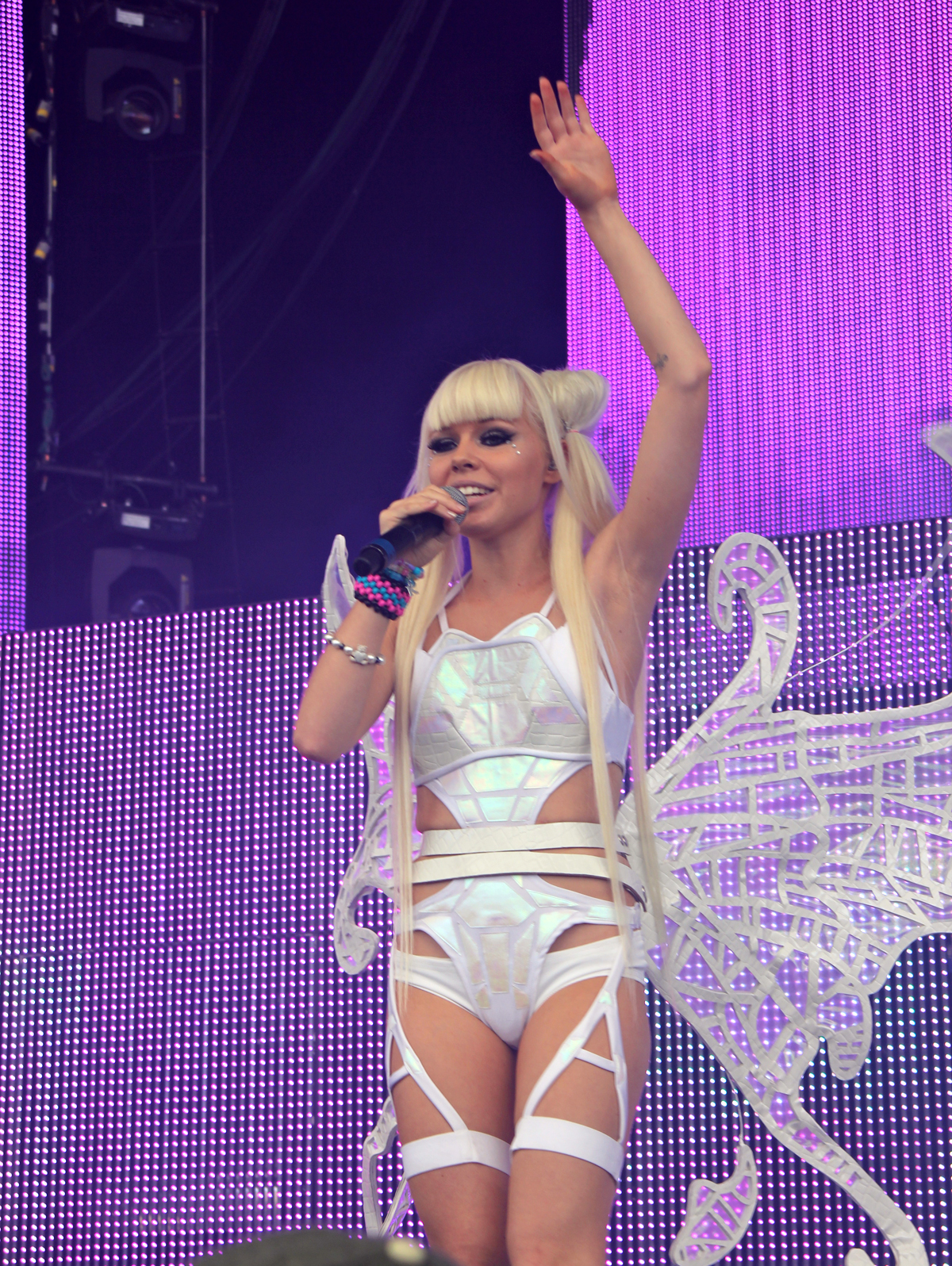
- Kerli performing at the Identity Festival in Houston, Texas in August 2012
- Born: Kerli Kõiv; 7 February 1987 (age 39); Elva, then part of Estonian SSR, Soviet Union
- Occupations: Singer; songwriter
- Musical career
- Genres: Pop; alternative rock; electronic; dance-pop; goth-pop
- Instruments: Vocals; piano
- Years active: 2002–present
- Labels: Stolen Transmission; Republic; Island; Ultra; Monstercat; Tiny Cute Monster; Seeking Blue
- Website: kerlimusic.com

Kerli Kõiv (Estonian: [ˈkerli ˈkɤ.iʋ]; born 7 February 1987), known mononymously as Kerli, is an Estonian singer and songwriter.

Kerli entered multiple singing competitions before LA Reid signed her to Island Records in 2006. She released her debut self-titled EP (2007) and her debut studio album Love Is Dead (2008), the latter charting on the Billboard 200. The lead single from the album, "Walking on Air", charted in several European countries; it was also featured as the iTunes Store's Single of the Week, being downloaded over 500,000 times to set a new record. Kerli contributed the song "Tea Party" to the album Almost Alice (2010). With her 2010 single "Army of Love", she began to move away from her alternative rock sound for a more electronic and dance-influenced sound.

Kerli released her second EP Utopia (2013), which became her second release to chart on the Billboard 200. "Army of Love" and "Zero Gravity" were released as singles from the EP prior to the first official single "The Lucky Ones". All three songs entered the top 10 of the Billboard Hot Dance Club Songs chart, two of them peaking at No. 1. Two songs co-written by Kerli for Utopia, "Skyscraper" and "I Feel Immortal", were left off the EP and later respectively covered by Demi Lovato and Tarja Turunen. Kerli's version of "I Feel Immortal" was later released on Frankenweenie Unleashed! (2012).

Kerli performed twice on Dancing with the Stars in 2013. Vibe called the performances a "major milestone in the EDM world". In November 2013, Kerli left Island Records and signed a record deal with Ultra Music. She later released her second studio album Shadow Works (2019).

== Early life ==
Kerli Kõiv was born in Elva on 7 February 1987, the daughter of social worker Piret and auto mechanic Toivo Kõiv. Her younger sister, Eliisa, is also a musician who competed on Eesti otsib superstaari. In 2003, when she was 16, her parents separated. Her father later married Leelo Suidt, chairwoman of Elva City Council, and faced up to three years in prison for a domestic violence incident against her in 2010. Kerli later said that when writing her 2013 track "Supergirl", a song about domestic violence, "I put myself in my mother's body and said things that I wished she would've said to my dad when I was little."

As a child, Kerli practiced ballroom dancing five days a week for eight years. She was first introduced to music by her kindergarten teacher, who told her mother that Kerli had "nice pitch" and that she was interested in taking her to various singing competitions. At eight years old, Kerli gained an interest in classical music; as there was an absence of music in her early life, she only possessed two cassettes, which were albums by Bonnie Tyler and Phil Collins. She began writing stories, mini books, and poems at the age of 10 to escape to an "imaginary world" from her abusive household. Against the advice of her mother and teachers, she dropped out of school at the age of 16 to pursue music.

== Career ==
=== 2002–2005: Career beginnings ===
In 2002, Kerli competed in the singing competition Laulukarussell in the age group category 13–15 and on 18 May won with the song "Bridge over Troubled Water". Also in 2002, she falsified her age to enter the Baltic song contest Fizz Superstar, as the minimum age was fifteen. She ended up winning the contest, gaining a singing contract to Universal Republic Records by Rob Stevenson. She was later dropped as Stevenson's position at the label changed. Later, Estonian media began to use the term "Kerli Syndrome" as a synonym for "failure". Kerli has stated, however, that she feels no resentment towards her home country. In a 2008 interview she said the following:

No, I don't feel any resentment [towards Estonia]. For a while, because I left Estonia and Estonians didn't hear anything about me so all these Estonian young singers were like... I guess they're slowly turning around now and understanding that I really was doing something here.

Stevenson later signed Kerli to his label Stolen Transmission but the label went bankrupt. At the age of 16, Kerli moved to Stockholm where she competed in Melodifestivalen in 2003 but was eliminated in the second semifinals. In 2004, she was the runner-up in that year's Eurolaul – a televised competition that determines the song that will represent Estonia in the Eurovision Song Contest – with her song "Beautiful Inside". While in Stockholm for two years, she worked with numerous producers and due to lack of money as the contracts she had gained previously were unsuccessful, she ate nothing but rice for three months, lived in an abandoned house during winter and slept on a cot. At the age of 18, she moved to the United States where she continued to perform and write songs, ultimately getting an audition with L.A. Reid, who signed her to The Island Def Jam Music Group in 2006.

=== 2006–2009: Love Is Dead ===
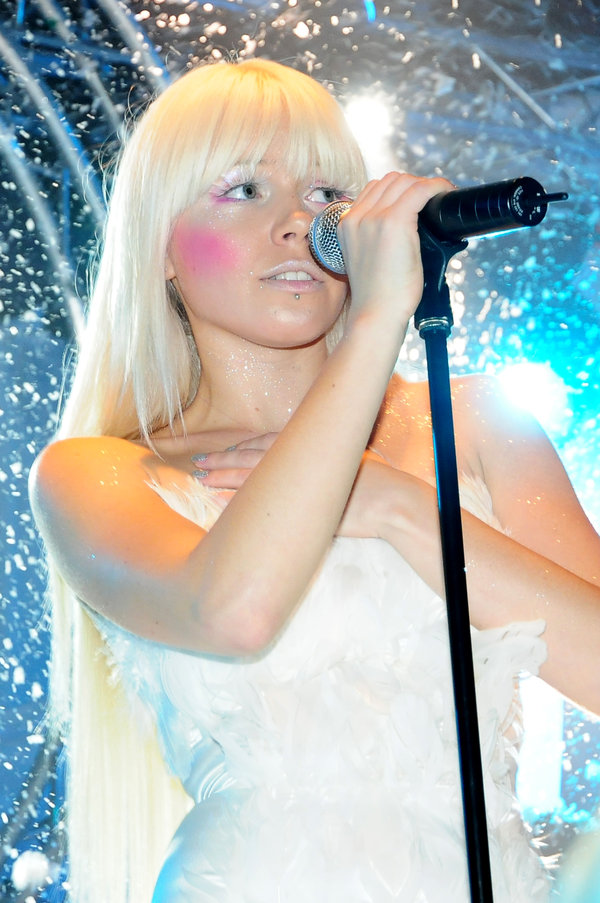
Kerli performing in 2008

In 2006, Kerli worked with producer, songwriter, and mixer David Maurice on an autobiographical set of songs, the first set of which were released on a self-titled EP in 2007. She finally released her debut album, titled Love Is Dead on 8 July 2008, following her debut single "Walking on Air" which charted at number 75 on the European Hot 100, and a promotional single "Creepshow". "Creepshow" was featured in the TV series Fringe, The City, as well as in the video game Burnout Paradise. The music video for the song "Love Is Dead" was released on 29 February 2008 and the music video for "Walking on Air" premiered on MTV Overdrive on 20 May 2008. "Walking on Air" was downloaded 550,000 times when it was featured as iTunes' "Single of the Week", which was a record at the time. The song appeared twice on So You Think You Can Dance? as well in an advertisement for Fringe. Love Is Dead charted at number 126 on the Billboard 200 for the week of 26 July.

Later in 2008, she was selected to perform a song titled "When Nobody Loves You" for the video game 007: Quantum of Solace, as well as the song "Bulletproof" on the official soundtrack of Punisher: War Zone.

In 2009, Kerli performed at the Estonian music festival Õllesummer in Tallinn. On 10 September 2009, Island Def Jam announced Kerli's iPhone application and the first song, "Saima", was released the following month. Kerli re-released her song "The Creationist" as a duet with the Italian songwriter Cesare Cremonini.

Kerli received a European Border Breakers Award for the success of the album Love Is Dead in Estonia.

=== 2010–2014: Utopia, and label change ===
On 2 March 2010, Almost Alice, a compilation album featuring music inspired by Disney's Alice in Wonderland was released. It contains two songs performed by Kerli, "Tea Party" and "Strange", the latter being a collaboration with Tokio Hotel. A remix album of "Tea Party" was released on 15 June 2010. She covered the song "Nature Boy" for a promo for the tenth season of Smallville.

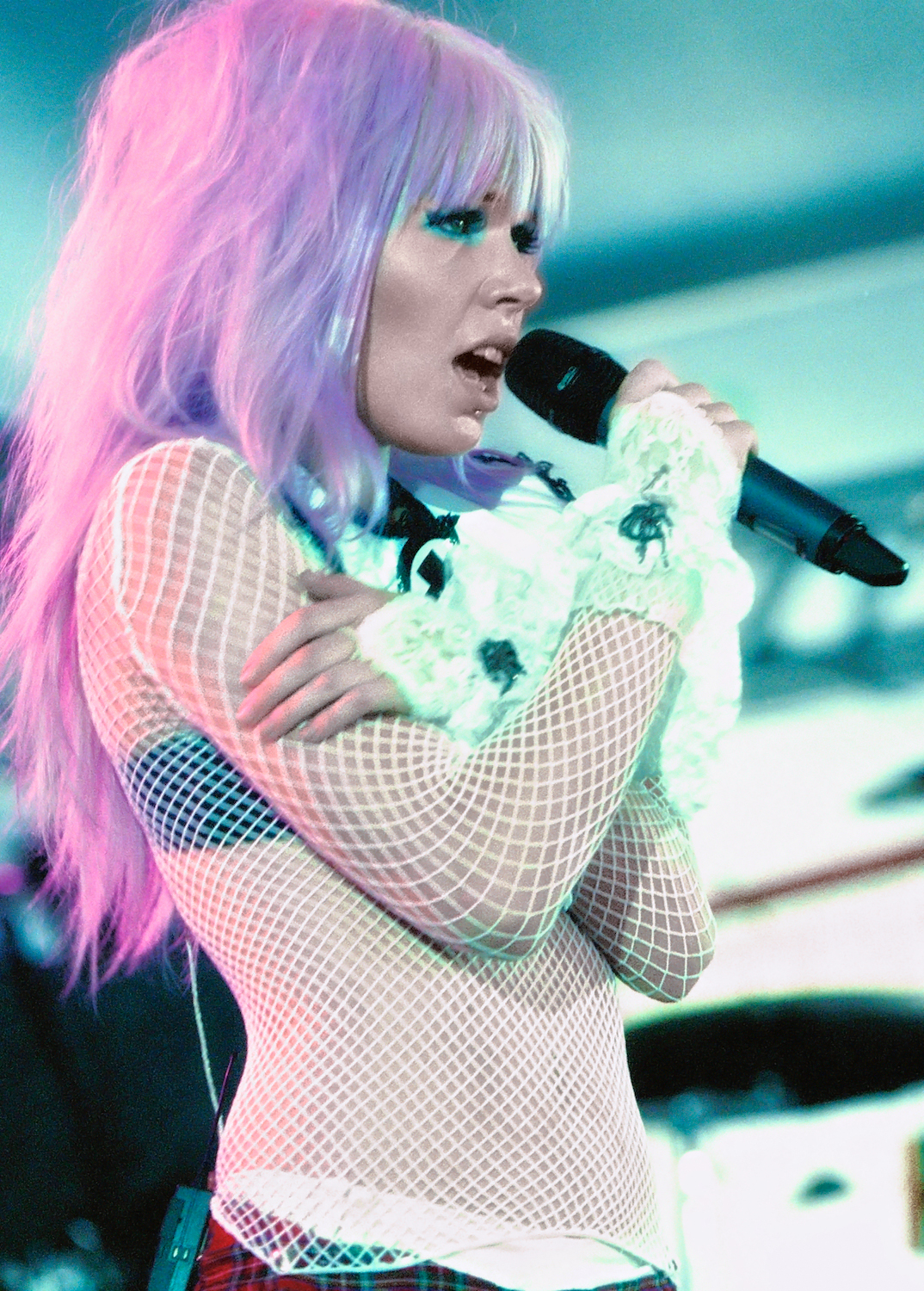
Kerli performing in 2011

On 19 December 2010, Kerli performed a song in Estonian titled "Sa kuldseks jää" ("Stay Golden") at her grandparents' art show in Estonia. Kerli stated that she wished to officially release the song in Estonia to gain local airplay.

After the release of Love Is Dead, Kerli began working on her second studio album, which later became her third major release and second EP titled Utopia. She has stated that she has developing a "new musical style called Bubble Goth" and that the Love Is Dead album was "really moody and dark and introverted, so this album is actually more fun, but it still has that twistedness" and that she has "trying to develop a whole new sound-scape that [she does not think she has] heard before". She has also said that it is "a very strong album" about "overcoming the darkness in [her]..overcoming blaming the world for what's wrong...taking responsibility, being inspired and inspiring others." "Army of Love" was released for free via download on Kerli's official website. It was then released as a single for purchase on 12 April 2011. The song was considered for promotion to become the album's lead single. The music video for "Army of Love" was filmed over several days in Estonia during early November. The video "sets the undertone of [her] entire new album". The music video officially premiered on December 22, 2010. "Army of Love" peaked at number one on Billboard's Hot Dance Club Songs chart for the week of 7 May 2011.

A song titled "Skyscraper" was written by Toby Gad, Lindy Robbins, and Kerli for Utopia however the song did not make it to her album and instead Kerli gave it to be recorded by American musician Demi Lovato for her album Unbroken. Kerli was very pleased by Lovato's recording and responded by saying "I really think that artists are story tellers and are here to deliver a message and there's no better person that I can think of right now than her to deliver that very story. So although I did write this song for my album, it's really her song. She nails it, she owns it. I am just the Santa's little helper here." Gad, Robbins, and Kerli also penned a song titled "I Feel Immortal" for Kerli that also did not make it to her album. The song was eventually recorded by Finnish musician Tarja for her album What Lies Beneath. A version of the track titled "Immortal" recorded by Kerli appears on Frankenweenie Unleashed!, an album consisting of tracks from and inspired by the Tim Burton film Frankenweenie.

The music video for "Zero Gravity" began production on 25 January and premiered on 21 March. It is directed by Canadian director Alon Isocianu. It was supposed to be the first single from the new album as well as "Army of Love", but later Kerli stated that neither "Zero Gravity" nor "Army of Love" were official singles and that they were only buzz singles. In May 2012, Kerli wrote on Facebook the album was finished and mastered, and in September confirmed that a single from the album titled "The Lucky Ones" would be released on 29 October 2012. It was written by Kerli, Svante Halldin, and Jakob Hazell. A press release by Warner Music Group stated the album would be released in spring 2013. The music video for the song is directed by Ethan Chancer, and was released on 5 December. In March 2013, the official tracklist as well as the artwork for Utopia EP was released. It was actually first supposed to be a full LP, but as it completely leaked in the middle of December, the label wanted to cut out some songs for March and wanted to release it as an EP; the final official track listing for the EP only includes "Can't Control the Kids", "The Lucky Ones", "Sugar", "Love Me or Leave Me", "Here and Now", "Chemical" and a "The Lucky Ones" remix by one of the Estonian rising DJs Syn Cole, leaving out six songs: "Made For Loving You", "Last Breath", "Supergirl", "Speed Limit", "Kaleidoscope" (which was later released as a Benny Benassi collaboration featuring Kerli), and also "Zero Gravity" was left out, which was first supposed to be on the album too. The EP was finally released digitally on 19 March and physically on 13 May (only in the Baltic states and Finland).

In October 2012, Kerli participated in ASCAP's week-long songwriting retreat at the Château Marouatte in Dordogne before joining Warner/Chappell Music. Kerli also collaborated with Australian trance musician tyDi on the tracks "Glow in the Dark" and "Something About You", as well as with Cash Cash on a track titled "Here and Now". Kerli is currently working on her third studio album and has stated that she would like it to be "a little more punk rock" and "a little more raw" than her previous work.

In November 2013, Kerli parted ways with Island Records and joined Ultra Music. Kerli collaborated with Seven Lions in two songs for his EP Worlds Apart, with the title song being released as a single by Ultra Records at 3 June 2014. An accompanying music video for the song was released by 16 August. Kerli teamed up with Benny Benassi on 21 July; for a re-edit of "Kaleidoscope", a song originally recorded for her shelved second album Utopia. By the end of September, Kerli worked again with Australian DJ tyDi in a song called "Perfect Crush" for tyDi's album Redefined.

In 2014, Kerli co-wrote the song "See Through" by Pentatonix with Joonas Angeria and Thomas Kirjonen for their third extended play, PTX, Vol. III.

=== 2015–present: Eesti Laul and Shadow Works ===
On 5 November 2015, it was revealed that Kerli composed a song for Eesti Laul 2016, Estonia's national selection for the Eurovision Song Contest 2016. In 2015, Kerli left Los Angeles and returned to Estonia, where she spent nine months with no running water and only her music-making gear to keep her company, where she produced her first independent album.

Her single "Feral Hearts" was released digitally worldwide on 19 February 2016. The music video for "Feral Hearts" was released the following week on February 25. "Blossom", the second single from her second studio album, followed with a video on 28 April and the song's release on iTunes the next day.

On 26 June, Kerli released the song "Racing Time". She explained that it was one of three songs written for the 2016 film Alice Through the Looking Glass. She had previously contributed to the Almost Alice concept album for the 2010 film Alice in Wonderland. However, the songs were not included on the latest movie's soundtrack. On 27 July, she released the third single from her upcoming sophomore studio album, "Diamond Hard", along with its music video.

On 22 April 2016, Kerli was featured as a vocalist and co-wrote a song on British artist Katy B's Honey album. She co-wrote and sang the hook on "I Wanna Be".

On 8 November 2016, it was revealed that Kerli would compete in Eesti Laul 2017, with the song "Spirit Animal". She reached the final and finished second in the competition. She was later announced to be representing Estonia in the OGAE Second Chance Contest 2017 with "Spirit Animal", held in Warsaw. On 24 April 2017, Kerli and Illenium released their collaboration song "Sound of Walking Away", included in Illenium's second studio album Awake (2017).

By late 2018, the original second studio album, including the 2016 singles, was announced to be scrapped. To replace it, on 12 November 2018, it was announced that Kerli's new album, which was a brand new project, will be released on 22 February 2019, with three singles being released prior the album. The first one, titled "Savages", on 30 November 2018. "Better" was released as the second on 18 January 2019, and "Legends" followed as the third on February 8, 2019. The album cover and the track listing were revealed on 30 November, along with the pre-order of the album on iTunes. It was also announced that only two videos from the three singles would be released, one being "Savages" and the other is yet to be announced. The music video for "Savages" was released. The album, titled Shadow Works, was released in 2019.

On 11 August 2020, Kerli was featured on the album Another Life/Eternally Yours: Motion Picture Collection by the heavy metal band Motionless in White. A re-recording of their song "Another Life" featured Kerli on guest vocals. In February of 2023, Kerli released a single titled "21st Century Kids", following it up with an EP titled "Oversoul" in 2024.

== Artistry ==
=== Style and influences ===
In an interview, Kerli recalled buying The Miseducation of Lauryn Hill by Lauryn Hill (which she called "one of [her] favourite records of all time") at a metro station in Russia. She asked them to "give [her] something else really good", "something that people buy". She was given Greatest Hits by Björk, whom she was unfamiliar with at the time. She now cites Björk as a major influence and her favourite musician. Kerli cites Bonnie Tyler and Phil Collins as influences as well as they recorded the only two albums she possessed prior to this.

Among her other influences are Anouk, Joni Mitchell, Janis Joplin, Massive Attack, Kidneythieves, Pendulum, the Cocteau Twins, A Perfect Circle, Deftones, Incubus, Apparat, and Imogen Heap.

Artists like [Imogen Heap] are the biggest inspiration for me because when Imogen wins a Grammy for engineering, that to me is the real shit. Somebody else writing your record and the whole 'pop stardom fame' stuff, I can't really connect to that at all. I'm rooting for Imogen. I'm rooting for Björk. I'm rooting for those chicks. And I'm trying to make that essence and inspiration [in my music] and make it a little more pop.

— Kerli,

"Zero Gravity" (2012)
Kerli's modern music contains an electronic dance and rave influenced sound, entirely different from her older music.

Kerli also attributes her beliefs in angels and fairies to be an influence in her music, and said the song "Xtal" by Aphex Twin was her "favourite piece of music of all time". She has also spoken of influence from Sigur Rós and has cited them as her favourite band.

After the release of Love Is Dead, Kerli was labelled as "goth" and a disagreeing critic said she was more along the lines of "bubblegum goth." Kerli stated "that's exactly what I am" and that she was "going to take this concept and roll with it" and she created the derivative "BubbleGoth". Described by Kerli, BubbleGoth is "putting together light and dark, opposites, and things that you don't really necessarily think go together." Kerli cites the Spice Girls as being a major influence on BubbleGoth, which she stated is "like a gothic spice girl".

Kerli is fond of wearing various unique and colourful hairstyles, often inspired by cyberpunk and goth fashion.

The difference in musical style and composition in Love Is Dead compared to Kerli's further releases is significant. Love Is Dead being alternative rock and her current music being along the lines of synthpop. Kerli describes herself as being very depressed during the production of Love Is Dead and that she felt "scattered" and describes the transition to the new sound as an attempt to "make it really radio friendly without losing what people already love about [her]." In response to criticism concerning her sound compared to her older sound, Kerli said she was "not the same person anymore", stating "Maybe I will be [on] my third album. Maybe I'll be totally depressed and write another really dark album. I have no idea where I'm going to go. All I know is that I'm just always going to try to grow and do my best. And whatever comes out of me is just going to be a reflection of who I am at that moment."

=== Public image ===
One of Kerli's logos which features "Moon Marks"

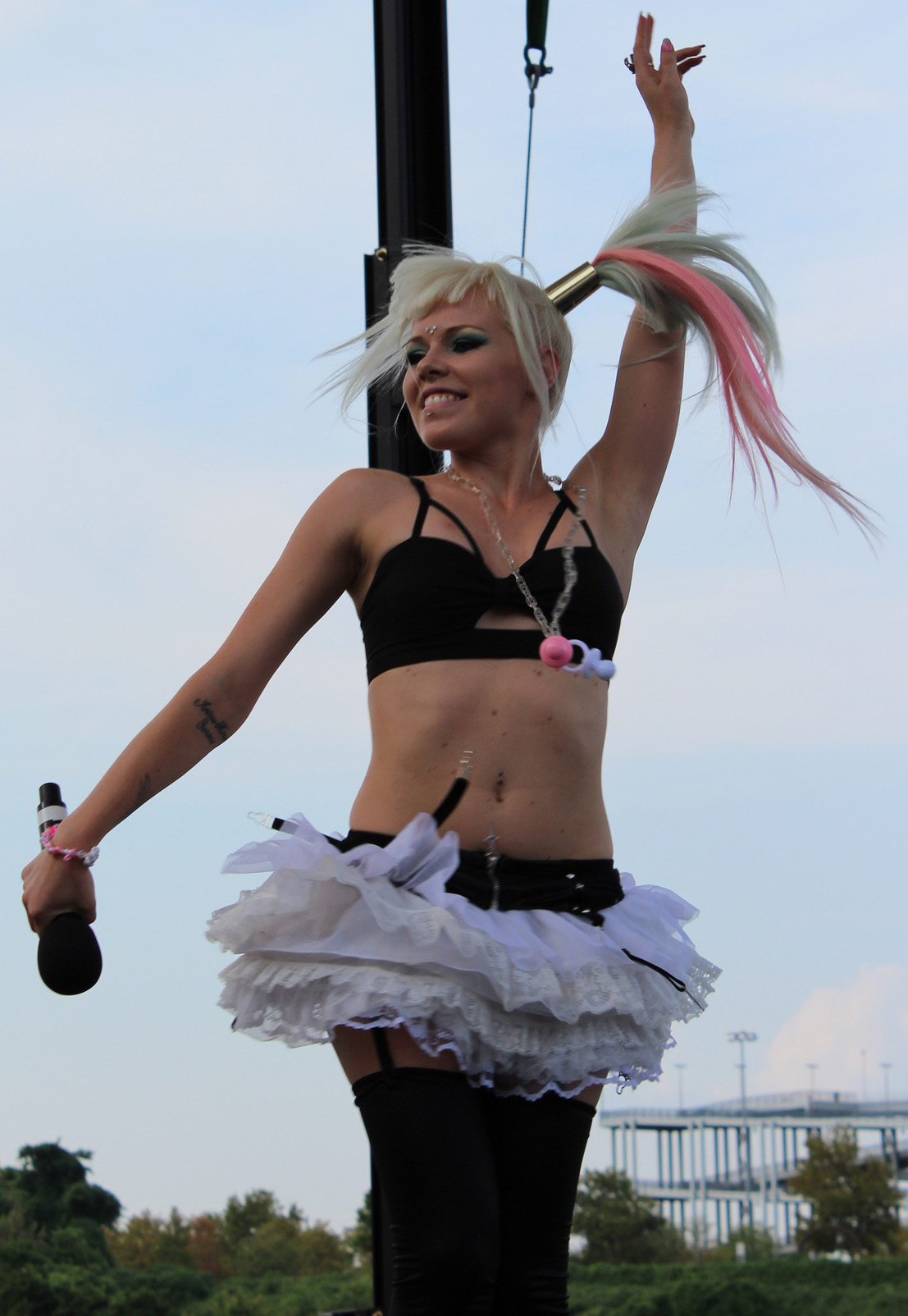
Kerli performing at the 2012 Nashville Pride Festival

Kerli frequently wears three dots called "moon marks" that represent integrity, love and unity, three things that are also followed by Moon Children: an elaborated fan community/street team established by Kerli in 2006 for people who "feel too much and find it hard to exist in this world, so that they wouldn't think they're crazy." It originally began as a "gathering for Indigo kids" but developed into a "movement of Integrity, Love and Unity" which is "trying to be the best you can be, taking responsibility for your reality and living with your eyes open. It's not some religious preachy thing, rather being a passenger in this dimension, trying to make the most of your experience and striving for perfection while understanding it's okay not to be perfect."

In regards to LGBT rights, she has stated that she wishes "the world would already be in a place where everyone is equally able to marry, adopt and live their life without having to explain themselves" and that it is "not a matter of political views, it's a matter of human rights. All humans need to have equal rights, straight or gay. As long as one likes to go to church and believe in God and that makes them a better, nicer person, that's great. Once hatred and superiority comes to play, I'm against religion." In 2011, Kerli stated that in Estonia, "there really is no gay scene" but that "it's starting to emerge, and [she's] trying to support it as much as [she] can." In June 2011 and 2012, Kerli performed at pride festivals in Boston, Detroit, Nashville, and San Francisco. She is also a participant in the NOH8 Campaign.

In 2011, Kerli was listed as one of the 100 Most Influential Estonian Women.

== Personal life ==
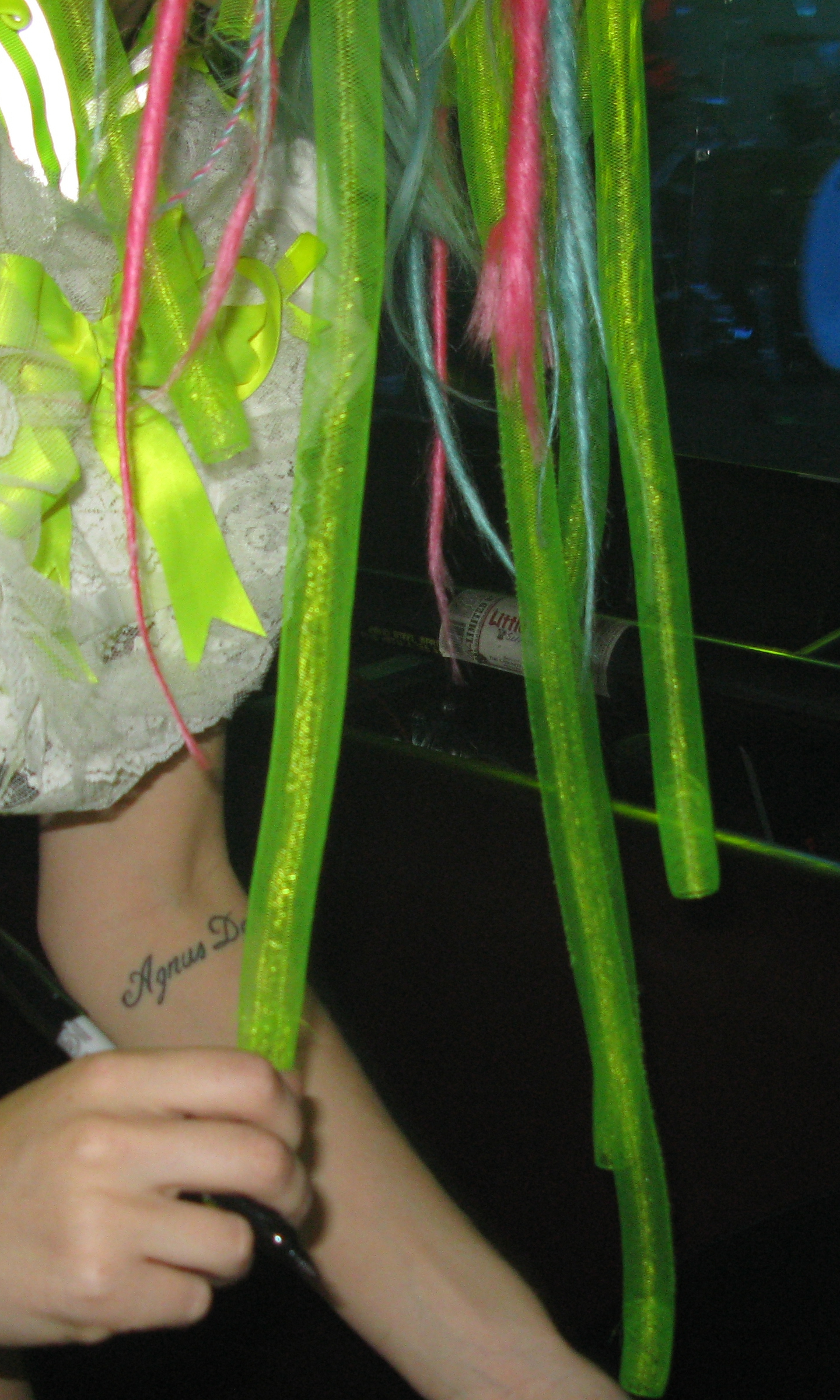
Kerli's Agnus Dei tattoo

At the age of 15, Kerli asked her mother for a tattoo reading 音乐 (Chinese for "music"). Her mother said she could do it if she read "every book in town" on China and wrote a report on it; she did as requested, and her mother took her to get the tattoo the day before her 16th birthday. She has three tattoos on her forearm: one is of a butterfly which symbolises "living every day like it was [her] last" and that she would never "leave a person that [she] loves without them knowing how much [she] loves them", one is the Triple Goddess symbol, and the other states is the Latin phrase Amicus Humani Generis, which she translates to "a friend of the human race". A tattoo on her left forearm, again in Latin, reads Agnus Dei (Lamb of God). On her right foot, she has the letter E, the initial of someone who "broke [her] heart". In 2017, she got a tattoo of a snake around her wrist.

While not belonging to any religion nor labelling herself as such, Kerli believes in reincarnation, other forms of the afterlife, fairies (which she has cited as a large part of her life), angels, and demons, once defining them as "reflections" of one's "inner light" and "inner darkness". Besides thanking her guardian angels in the liner notes for Love Is Dead, she has also stated she feel angels are beings, as well as using "angel cards".

Kerli has said that she has depression and bipolar disorder, and attempted suicide when she was 17 as a result of her troubled upbringing. She said that her background has "made [her] stronger and now [she] can be here for other kids who are like [her]" and that she is happy to be alive, describing life as a "beautiful and rare gift". During a live video chat with fans in October 2011, she recalled a time when she was 17 and would ask her doctor to sedate her with medication because it "hurt [her] so much to be awake" due to her depression. She also recalled an instance around the same time when she was home alone, and covered the windows with dark towels to block out the sunlight before cutting herself with rusty scissors because she "wanted to die" and "couldn't feel any physical pain at all because [she] was just hurting so much inside".

== Discography ==
=== Studio albums ===
- Love Is Dead (2008)
- Shadow Works (2019)

=== EPs ===
- Kerli (2007)
- Utopia (2013)
- Deepest Roots (2016)
- OVERSOUL (2024)

=== Music Videos ===
- "Goodbye" (2007) Directed By Dave Schwep
- "Love Is Dead" (2007) Directed By Josh Mond
- "Walking On Air" (2008) Directed By Alex Topaller & Daniel Shapiro
- "Creepshow" (2008) Directed By Daniel Muntinen and Jaagup Metal
- "Tea Party" (2009) Directed By Justin Harder
- "Army of Love" (2011) Directed By Kaiser Kukk
- "Zero Gravity" (2012) Directed By Alon Isocianu
- "Glow in the Dark" (2012) Directed By Darren Teale
- "The Lucky Ones" (2012) Directed By Ethan Chancer
- "Worlds Apart" (2014) Directed By Bobby Galvan
- "Feral Hearts" (2016) Directed By CJ Kask
- "Feral Hearts (Sacred Forrest Session)" (2016) Directed By CJ Kask
- "Blossom" (2016) Directed By CJ Kask
- "Blossom (The Halls Heaven Session)" (2016) Directed By CJ Kask
- "Diamond Hard" (2016) Directed By Kerli
- "Diamond Hard (360)" (2016) Directed By CJ Kask
- "Savages" (2019) Directed By Kerli & Everett Lee-Sung
- "21st Century Kids" (2023) Directed By Kerli
- "By the Light of the Moon" (2026) Directed By Gundars Magone

== Awards and nominations ==
Year	Nominee / work	Award	Result
2008	Herself	MTV Europe Music Award for Best Baltic Act	Nominated
2008	"Walking on Air"	MTV Europe Music Award for Best Video	Nominated
2009	"Walking on Air"	Raadio 2 Hit of the Year	Won
2009	"Walking on Air"	Estonian Music Award for Music Video of the Year	Won
2009	Herself	Estonian Music Award for Pop Artist of the Year	Won
2009	Herself	Estonian Music Award for Female Artist of the Year	Won
2009	Love Is Dead	Estonian Music Award for Album of the Year	Nominated
2010	Love Is Dead	European Border Breakers Award	Won
2010	"Army of Love"	Raadio 2 Hit of the Year	Nominated
2011	"Army of Love"	Estonian Music Award for Music Video of the Year	Won
2012	"Zero Gravity"	MP3 Music Award for The BNA Award	Nominated
2013	"Zero Gravity"	Estonian Music Award for Music Video of the Year	Won
2014	Utopia	Estonian Music Award for Best Female Album	Nominated
2014	Utopia	Estonian Music Award for Best Pop Album	Nominated
2017	"Feral Hearts"	Estonian Music Award for Music Video of the Year	Nominated
