= Tea Party (song) =

2010 song by Kerli

Single by Kerli

from the album Almost Alice
- Released: 15 June 2010
- Genre: Dance-pop; electropop
- Length: 3:29
- Label: Buena Vista
- Songwriter(s): Kerli; Brian Ziff
- Producer(s): Brian Ziff

Kerli singles chronology
"The Creationist" (2009)	"Tea Party" (2010)	"Army of Love" (2011)

Music video
- "Tea Party" on YouTube

"Tea Party" is a song by Estonian singer Kerli. It is featured on the album Almost Alice, a multi-artist compilation album which features music inspired by the 2010 film Alice in Wonderland released on 2 March 2010.

"Tea Party" was released as a single from the Almost Alice soundtrack through a maxi single featuring the song and six remixes that was released digitally on 15 June 2010.

The music video, which is directed by Justin Harder, premiered on 10 March 2010.

== Composition ==
Kerli stated she wanted to create something "psychedelic [and] twisted" and inspired by the Alice in Wonderland film.

== Release ==
Kerli stated it was intended that the song would never see its proper release as a single as she feels her upcoming second studio album is better and she "didn't want the label to fully go with something like 'Tea Party' as a single and then not push all the other stuff if 'Tea Party' didn't do everything they needed it to." However, a remix single was given a digital release on 15 June 2010.

== Critical reception ==
USA Today gave "Tea Party" a positive review while criticizing the Almost Alice album as a whole, citing it as "curiously meek" and stating the album lacked an Alice in Wonderland theme with the exception of "Tea Party": a "bouncy, innuendo-packed slice of dance pop that will have parents wondering how it slipped past Disney censors."

About.com opined that the track "meld[s] the styles of Avril Lavigne and Lady Gaga for an energetic electro-pop number that seems uncharacteristic for her, despite how much fun it is."

The Houston Chronicle gave Almost Alice a negative review along with "Tea Party", saying the song could have "benefited from a more adventurous arrangement".

== Music video ==
Kerli pours potion into the tea before it is served.

The music video is directed by Justin Harder and debuted on 10 March 2010. It features Kerli throwing a lavish tea party with her guests in abstract make-up and costumes. It is revealed towards the end Kerli added a potion to the tea which causes the guests to turn into dolls which she collects and places on a shelf.

== Live performances ==
Kerli performed "Tea Party", "Walking on Air" and "Strange" at the Alice in Wonderland Ultimate Fan Event at the Hollywood and Highland Center on 19 February 2010. The performance was a promotion of the Alice in Wonderland film and its soundtrack.

On 26 May 2010, Kerli performed "Tea Party" at the opening night of the Fashion Institute of Design & Merchandising exhibit for Walt Disney Studios in Los Angeles, California.

== Track listing ==
- Digital maxi single
1. "Tea Party" – 3:28
2. "Tea Party" (Jason Nevins Radio Remix) – 3:12
3. "Tea Party" (Jason Nevins Extended Remix) – 5:55
4. "Tea Party" (Jason Nevins Extended Instrumental) – 5:55
5. "Tea Party" (Chew Espresso Fix) – 3:49
6. "Tea Party" (Chew Espresso Fix Extended) – 5:55
7. "Tea Party" (Chew Espresso Fix Extended Instrumental) – 5:55
