= Army of Love =

2010 song by Kerli

Single by Kerli
- Released: December 16, 2010
- Genre: Dance-pop; electropop
- Length: 3:24
- Label: Island
- Songwriter(s): Kerli Kõiv; Jean Baptiste; Michael McHenry; Ryan Buendia
- Producer(s): Free School; Jean Baptiste

Kerli singles chronology
"Tea Party" (2010)	"Army of Love" (2010)	"Zero Gravity" (2012)

Music video
- "Army Of Love" on YouTube

"Army of Love" is a single released by Estonian recording artist Kerli, from her shelved second studio album Utopia. The song was written by Kerli, Jean Baptiste, Mick McHenry and Ryan Buendia and was produced by Free School Music and Jean Baptiste. It was released on December 16, 2010, via free download on Kerli's official website. It was released for purchase as a single on April 12, 2011. A 9-track remix EP was released on May 3, 2011, and part 2 was released on June 21, 2011.

The song charted on Billboard's Hot Dance Club Play Songs chart for a total of 11 weeks, and peaked at number 1 for the week of May 7, 2011. "Army of Love" was number 12 on the 2011 Billboard Year-End Dance/Club Songs chart.

== Background ==
Kerli announced on November 4, 2010, that the first promotional single from her sophomore album would be titled "Army of Love" and that the video had nearly finished production.

== Composition ==
"Army of Love"
A 30 second sample of "Army of Love", which features the first verse, build and chorus.

"Army of Love" was written by Kerli, Jean Baptiste, Michael McHenry and Ryan Buendia. It was produced by Free School Music and Baptiste. "Army of Love" features a very distinct rhythmic electronic beat primarily consisting of an electronic keyboard, synths and a short drum beat. The song samples melody from 3 AM Eternal by the KLF. The song is composed in the key of C♯ minor with a moderate tempo of 124 beats per minute.

== Critical reception ==
About.com Dance Music / Electronica's DJ Ron Slomowicz selected the track as "Song of the Day", stating "Whether blatantly selling out or making a true artistic shift in musical direction, 'Army of Love' is catchy and may just make Kerli more accessible across the board. "

== Chart performance ==
The song debuted at number 51 on the Billboard's Hot Dance Club Songs chart and after eleven weeks, peaked at number 1. It also peaked at number 3 on the "Raadio Uuno Top 40" and number 10 on the Estonian Top 40.

== Music video ==
The music video officially premiered on December 22 on YouTube through Kerli's Vevo channel.

=== Development ===
The video was filmed over several days in Estonia. It was directed by Kaimar Kukk.

=== Synopsis ===
The first scene of the video is Kerli sitting a child's bedroom in a rocking chair, playing with a Rubik's Cube. The video cuts to Kerli in an abandoned warehouse where she picks up a phone and announces "Moonchildren, prepare to take over the universe". The song then begins with Kerli singing the lyrics into a megaphone as various people (presumably Moonchildren) emerge from different places and march alongside her as she continues singing, thus building the "army" mentioned throughout the song. They follow her into a forest, where she finds a unicorn. Several cut-in scenes depict Kerli as an elven princess swinging on a wooden swing, as well as Kerli performing the song on a truck stage for an audience of enthusiastic Moonchildren. The final scene of the video is the Moonchildren marching after Kerli as she rides the unicorn off into the forest, and the video is subsequently concluded by a title screen proclaiming "To Be Continued..." In the first half of video, up until the point where the song begins, the words "integrity", "love", and "unity" can be heard whispered by Kerli. Phrases such as "integrity", "love", "unity", "we're coming", "follow me," and "K713" also blink on and off screen throughout the video.

=== Reception ===
As of January 2015, the music video has 4,607,958 views on YouTube. Review site Idolator said that the song's music video is the "hottest rave to hit Middle Earth, " referencing the works of J. R. R. Tolkien due to Kerli's elfin appearance in the video and the forest setting.

== Track listings and formats ==
- Digital download
1. "Army of Love" - 3:24
- Digital remix EP
1. "Army of Love (Mixin Marc & Tony Svejda Radio Edit)" - 4:12
2. "Army of Love (Chew Fu Rain Las Vegas Radio Edit)" - 3:46
3. "Army of Love (Sultan & Ned Shepard Radio Edit)" - 3:39
4. "Army of Love (Mixin Marc & Tony Svejda Remix)" - 7:02
5. "Army of Love (Chew Fu Rain Las Vegas Refix Extended Club)" - 5:35
6. "Army of Love (Sultan & Ned Shepard Extended Club Mix)" - 5:15
7. "Army of Love (Mixin Marc & Tony Svejda Instrumental)" - 7:01
8. "Army of Love (Chew Fu Rain Las Vegas Refix Dub)" - 5:35
9. "Army of Love (Sultan & Ned Shepard Club Dub)" - 4:59
- Digital remix EP, pt. 2
1. "Army of Love (Extended Army)" - 5:20
2. "Army of Love (WAWA Edit)" - 3:32
3. "Army of Love (Cherry Cherry Boom Boom Edit)" - 3:14
4. "Army of Love (WAWA Extended Mix)" - 6:17
5. "Army of Love (Cherry Cherry Boom Boom Refreak Mix)" - 4:39
6. "Army of Love (DJ Lynnwood Club Mix)" - 7:07
7. "Army of Love (WAWA Dub)" - 6:17
8. "Army of Love (DJ Lynnwood Dub)" - 6:09
- Digital remix EP, pt. 3
1. "Army of Love (Sonny Wharton Dub)" - 6:30
2. "Army of Love (Sonny Wharton Remix)" - 6:29
3. "Army of Love (Sonny Wharton Radio Edit)" - 3:25
4. "Army of Love (Riley & Durrant Radio Edit)" - 3:37
5. "Army of Love (Riley & Durrant Dub)" - 5:18
6. "Army of Love (Riley & Durrant Vocal Mix)" - 5:48

== Charts ==
Chart (2011)	Peak position
US Billboard Hot Dance Club Songs	1

=== Year-end charts ===
Chart (2011)	Position
US Hot Dance Club Songs (Billboard)	12

== Release history ==
Region	Date	Format
Worldwide	December 16, 2010	Digital download (free via Kerli's website)
United States	April 12, 2011	Digital download (for purchase)
United States	May 3, 2011	Digital remix EP
United States	June 21, 2011	Digital remix EP, pt. 2

== See also ==
- List of number-one dance singles of 2011 (U.S.)
