= Love Is Dead (Kerli album) =

2008 album by Kerli

Studio album by Kerli
- Released: 8 July 2008
- Genres: Alternative; pop; rock; electronica
- Length: 46:13
- Label: Island
- Producers: David Maurice; Lester Mendez; Guy Chambers; Benji Madden; Joel Madden; Jason Epperson; Mathias Wollo

Kerli chronology
| Kerli (2007) | Love Is Dead (2008) | Utopia (2013) |

Singles from Love Is Dead
- 1. "Walking on Air" Released: 8 April 2008; 2. "The Creationist" Released: 4 December 2009

Love Is Dead is the debut studio album by Estonian recording artist Kerli. It was released in the United States on 8 July 2008 by Island Records.

Love Is Dead is a pop, rock, alternative and electronica record that incorporates gothic influences. Its sound has been noted to contain influences from the music of artists such as Natasha Bedingfield and Björk, while it has been described as both uplifting and dark. The album received overall mixed reviews, nonetheless reviewers lauded its uniqueness and composition, while praising Kerli's vocals. The album peaked at number 2 on the US Heatseekers Albums chart, which measures the popularity of albums by new artists. It also reached number 126 on the Billboard 200 in the United States.

== Background and writing ==
Kerli began writing for her debut album at the age of 14 but after two failed recording contracts with Universal Republic Records and Stolen Transmission, she spent two years in Sweden writing music with other writers at the request of a Swedish publisher who took an interest in her music. She later caught the attention of Island Records and landed an audition with L.A. Reid who signed her. During the audition, which was Kerli's first visit to the United States, she later remarked she was "so out of it" which came off as rude, saying "I guess he liked that I wasn't kissing his ass".

In a 2008 interview, Kerli said she was grateful she was not in a position to release an album after gaining her first contract because, saying "I wasn't ready as a person. I didn't stand behind my vision the way I do now, and everything was much more about my ego and need for attention. It's about people now. It's about delivering something magical." She described the process of creating the album as a "10-year struggle".

== Composition ==
Kerli cites her upbringing in an abusive household as one of the main influences on Love Is Dead, saying "This is the place that I created for myself to escape to, and I want to share it with people now".

A lot of the songs I wrote when I was really depressed, and then the later songs I wrote after coming out from my depression, so the theme of the album pretty much is overcoming obstacles and overcoming the darkness. I’m really grateful for all these experiences because I believe that until you are absorbed by darkness you can't overcome it and face the light.

— Kerli

=== Lyrical content ===
The lyrics of the songs on Love Is Dead focus around Kerli's depression at the time as well as her life in Estonia. She noted a feeling of oppression and hostility still present in Estonia after the Soviet occupation ended, saying "I felt like everybody was always trying to break my spirit. I felt very lonely because I was always very passionate and very over the top. I was not scared to be different. I had to create my own world. I had to work hard and dream hard to get out of that environment." While citing "Walking on Air" and "Love Is Dead" as her favorite tracks from the album, she cites "Butterfly Cry" as the most meaningful song for her as it was the first song she wrote after coming out of her depression. It was written when she was 17 with Krister Linder, who she says was her "spiritual mentor".

"Walking on Air" and "Creepshow" discuss Kerli's childhood. Kerli has noted autobiographical connections to specific lyrics from "Walking on Air" such as "She has a little creepy cat" and "little rocking chair and an old blue hat" by recalling a feral cat she rescued as well as frequently wearing old hats as a child. "Creepshow" concerns Estonia specifically where Kerli says "being different is not really accepted" and that "it felt like even more of a creepshow than this little town environment that I wanted to get out of."

== Release and promotion ==
Originally due to be released in April 2008, the album was pushed back to July 29 and then pushed up to July 8. It eventually gained a wider European release in 2009 with a release in Italy in February, in Germany in April, and in Austria and Ireland in summer 2009. "Bulletproof" was part of Punisher: War Zone Original Motion Picture Soundtrack too.

=== Singles ===
"Love Is Dead" was released as the first promotional single on November 21, 2007 with "Walking on Air" being released on 8 April 2008 as the lead single and was a moderate success. "Creepshow" was released as the second promotional single in late 2008, "The Creationist" was released as the album's second and final commercial single exclusively in Italy in December 2009. This version also had new vocals from singer Cesare Cremonini.

== Critical reception ==
Professional ratings
Aggregate scores
| Source | Rating |
|---|---|
| Metacritic | 57/100 |
Review scores
| Source | Rating |
| About.com | 4.5/5 stars |
| AllMusic | 3.5/5 stars |
| Artistdirect | 4.5/5 stars |
| Los Angeles Times | 2/4 stars |
| Slant Magazine | 3/5 stars |
| Vail Daily | 3/5 stars |

Love Is Dead received positive reviews from music critics. Rick Florino of Artistdirect raved that the album is "more than just 'alternative music;' it's alternative art. Kerli's vision extends far beyond the notes recorded on her CD, and that's instantly apparent from her twisted fairytale aesthetic." Heather Phares of AllMusic concluded that "despite its faults, it is one of the most unique albums released by a major label in 2008." About.com's Ben Norman agreed, stating that it is "one of the best and most unique major label offerings of 2008, and hardly something to miss. With Kerli's emergence into the dance scene, I predict that this is the album to watch." Slant Magazine reviewer Sal Cinquemani complimented the album's first three tracks, "Love Is Dead", "Walking on Air", and "The Creationist", commenting that "they display enough diversity and musical savvy, if not actual talent, to warrant an endorsement", but criticized songs like "Creepshow" ("over-the-top") and "Butterfly Cry" ("plodding"). He also added that "[t]he formulas employed throughout Love Is Dead are often trite but the undeniable excitement and awe with which she approaches them is just as frequently refreshing."

Christy Grosz from the Los Angeles Times wrote that "[a]lthough her songs occasionally feature the alto piano of Apple or the otherworldly trilling of Morissette or Björk, her voice can sound thin and inconsistent, giving the whole thing a somewhat derivative feel" and that "a little more creepiness would give Kerli the edge that her appearance advertises." In his review for Blender, Andrew Harrison noted that "Love Is Dead's gothic gray walls of riff and throbbing drum machines are convincing enough, and Kerli has clearly lived a tough old life so far. Unfortunately, it translates into kohl-eyed pantomime, rather than cathartic music, with lyrics so hopelessly trite they sound like a feel-good tract for preschoolers." Vail Daily's Charlie Owen felt that the album "reveals Kerli's talent but sounds more like she's trying to find a direction than blazing a trail."

== Commercial performance ==
The album debuted at number 126 on the Billboard 200 in the United States, selling 5,500 copies in its first week. It also entered at number three on the Top Heatseekers chart (peaking at number two, two weeks later) and peaked at number 141 on the Top Digital Albums chart. With this, Kerli is the first Estonian artist to chart on the Billboard 200, where the album spent four weeks before dropping off. Despite having four single releases, the only song that made any impact on the charts was "Walking on Air".

== Track listing ==
| No. | Title | Writer(s) | Producer(s) | Length |
|---|---|---|---|---|
| 1. | "Love Is Dead" | Kerli Kõiv; David Maurice; Miles Gregory | Maurice | 4:36 |
| 2. | "Walking on Air" | Kõiv; Lester Mendez | Mendez | 4:27 |
| 3. | "The Creationist" | Kõiv; Guy Chambers | Chambers | 3:38 |
| 4. | "I Want Nothing" | Kõiv; Maurice | Maurice | 3:58 |
| 5. | "Up Up Up" | Kõiv; Maurice | Maurice | 3:26 |
| 6. | "Bulletproof" | Kõiv; Thomas Who | Maurice | 5:01 |
| 7. | "Beautiful Day" | Kõiv; Benji Madden; Joel Madden; Jason Epperson | Madden; Madden; Epperson | 3:51 |
| 8. | "Creepshow" | Kõiv; Maurice; Vanessa Bley | Maurice | 3:12 |
| 9. | "Hurt Me" | Kõiv; Mendez | Mendez | 3:37 |
| 10. | "Butterfly Cry" | Kõiv; Krister Linder | Mathias Wollo | 4:39 |
| 11. | "Strange Boy" | Kõiv; Maurice | Maurice | 3:18 |
| 12. | "Fragile" | Kõiv; Peter Agren; Anders Lennartsson | Maurice | 4:11 |

iTunes bonus track
| No. | Title | Writer(s) | Producer(s) | Length |
|---|---|---|---|---|
| 13. | "Heal" | Kõiv; Maurice | Maurice | 6:05 |

Note

- "Love Is Dead" contains samples of "Love Don't Live Here Anymore" by Rose Royce (written by Miles Gregory).

== Personnel ==
Credits adapted from Love Is Dead liner notes.

Production

- Guy Chambers – producer
- John Deley – string arranger
- T.J. Doherty – engineer
- Jason Epperson – producer
- John Ewing, Jr. – engineer
- Ill Factor – drum programmer
- Richard Flack – additional programmer, mixer
- Matty Green – assistant mixer
- Mike Green – engineer, mixer, assistant mixer
- Keith Gretlein – assistant engineer
- Benji Madden – producer
- Joel Madden – producer
- Lasse Mårtén – engineering, recording
- Mathias Mårtén – engineering, recording
- Tony Maserati – mixer
- David Maurice – drum programmer, engineer, mixer, producer
- Lester Mendez – producer, arranger
- Christian Olsson – programmer
- Neal Pogue – mixer
- Mark Roule – Pro Tools engineer, assistant mixer
- Natalie Shau – label art
- Paul Stanborough – acoustic guitar, programmer, recorder
- Oliver Strauss – string engineer
- Charles Wilson, Jr. – assistant mix engineer
- Mathias Wollo – arranger, producer, recorder
- Joe Wohlmuth – engineer

Musicians

- Peter Ågren – composer
- Mio Alt – violins
- Gregg E. August – double bass
- Vanessa Bley – backing vocals, composer
- Karl Brazil – drums, percussion
- Inbal Brener – cello
- Guy Chambers – ace tone rhythm ace, acoustic guitar, backing vocals, bass guitar, composer, fuzz guitar, synths, upright piano
- John Deley – keyboards
- Fil Eisler – guitars, bass guitar
- Per Eklund – drums, percussion
- Tony Falanga – double bass
- Fleshquartet – strings
- Richard Fortus – guitar
- Josh Freese – drums
- Tanesha Gary – backing vocals
- Josh Garza – drums
- Mike Green – bass
- Miles Gregory – composer ("Love Don't Live Here Anymore" sample)
- Mattias Hellden – cello
- Örjan Högberg – viola
- Jennifer Karr – backing vocals
- Kerli Kõiv – vocals, composer
- Yoon Kwon – violins
- Anders Lennartsson – composer
- Andreas Lavander – bass, organ
- Krister Linder – composer
- Jonas Lindgren – violin
- Benji Madden – composer, guitars
- Joel Madden – composer
- Audrey Martells – backing vocals
- David Maurice – bass guitar, composer, guitars, keyboards
- Lester Mendez – composer
- Emily Ondrovek – violins
- Joel W. Noyes – cello
- Sebastian Oberg – cello
- Inbal Segev – cello
- Sonus Quartet – strings
- Philip Spetzer – violins
- Jonathan Vinocour – viola
- Skoota Warner – drums
- Thomas Who – composer
- Mathias Wollo – guitars, kalimba, organ
- Alison Zlotow – violins

== Charts ==
Chart performance for Love Is Dead
| Chart (2008–2009) | Peak position |
|---|---|
| Belgian Albums (Ultratop Flanders) | 61 |
| Belgian Albums (Ultratop Wallonia) | 52 |
| Estonian Albums (Eesti Tipp-40) | 1 |
| Italian Albums (FIMI) | 64 |
| Swiss Albums (Schweizer Hitparade) | 92 |
| US Billboard 200 | 126 |
| US Heatseekers Albums (Billboard) | 2 |

== Release history ==
Release history and formats for Love Is Dead
| Country | Date | Format | Label |
|---|---|---|---|
| United States | 8 July 2008 | CD, digital download | Island |
| Belgium | 25 July 2008 | CD, digital download | Universal |
| Italy | 27 February 2009 | CD, digital download | Universal |
| Germany | 24 April 2009 | CD, digital download | Universal |
| Poland | 7 August 2009 | CD, digital download | Universal |
