= Zero Gravity (Kerli song) =

2012 song by Kerli

Single by Kerli
- Released: March 20, 2012
- Recorded: 2011–2012
- Genre: Dance-pop
- Length: 3:51
- Label: Island Def Jam
- Songwriter(s): Kerli Kõiv; Svante Halldin; Jakob Hazell
- Producer(s): SeventyEight

Kerli singles chronology
"Army of Love" (2011)	"Zero Gravity" (2012)	"Glow in the Dark" (2012)

"Zero Gravity" is a single by the Estonian recording artist Kerli. Produced by Jakob Hazell and Svante Halldin, it was officially released on March 20, 2012 by The Island Def Jam Music Group on digital media stores. The song draws heavy inspiration from space tourism, air, and more prominently, sylphs, as reflected in the music video which premiered on March 22. The song is about "merging with the spirit, becoming all love."

"Zero Gravity" debuted at number 32 on Billboard's Hot Dance Club Songs chart for the week of April 28, 2012. During its eighth week on the chart, the song peaked at number 6 for the week of June 16.

== Background ==
Kerli debuted "Zero Gravity" during a performance in Chicago in August 2011 and a demo of the studio version premiered on the Seattle radio station C89.5 on September 2, 2011. On March 6, 2012, C89.5 premiered the final version of the song.

== Composition ==
Kerli recalled thinking to herself upon hearing of space tourism, specifically the project of Richard Branson (who Kerli admires) "This is incredible! Who would have known I can witness this during my lifetime? I should write a song about this and it should be called 'Zero Gravity'." Kerli began to write the song shortly before abandoning it. A year later, Kerli was scheduled for two studio sessions while in Stockholm. With only five hours remaining in the second session, Kerli "had kinda given up on the idea that any producer would actually get [her] and become [her] musical soulmate" before meeting her "favorite producers and friends for life", Svante Halldin and Jakob Hazell (the team known as "SeventyEight", who also collaborated on "Lucky Ones" by Kerli). Kerli played for them the Wolfgang Gartner song "Space Junk" (2010), stating she "wanted to channel that but also mix some ethereal elements into that. Something like Enya or classical music. Something that sounds like angels on acid." The song was finished in the final hours of the session.

Kerli stated the lyrics of the song were written in "the honor of" the air spirit, sylph, and that song is about "merging with the spirit, becoming all love", continuing to say she "[loves] the air element and it kinda seems to be something that keeps popping up throughout the music [she makes]."

Hopefully you will feel love when you listen to it cause that's honestly the only kinda emotion I'm into bringing into the world at this point. Hopefully you're coming on this journey with me cause our potential as spiritual beings is limitless and we are meant to be beautiful, full of joy and celebrating every moment of being alive. We're given breath when we're born and it's taken away from us when we die so I don't wanna waste any time not feeling, giving and receiving all the goodness there is.

— Kerli

The song begins with a simple 10-note piano chord before being picked up by a synthy drum beat. The pre-chorus features a dizzying up and down feel before the chorus merges the drum beat with the piano chord and some more prominent synths. The second chorus finds a dubstep-like wobble bass before the bridge brings a heavier take on the pre-chorus's dizzy feel, also containing a drop, drawing further inspiration from dubstep. The song ends with the piano chord.

== Critical reception ==
"Zero Gravity" received mostly positive reviews from critics. Bill Lamb of About.com called Zero Gravity "straightforward dance pop", saying "the imagery of the accompanying video is more unique". Bradley Stern of MTV called the song "a trip" and compared it to Alexandra Burke's song "Elephant".

== Commercial performance ==
"Zero Gravity" debuted at number 32 on the Billboard Hot Dance Club Songs chart, which "Army of Love" previously peaked at number 1 on. "Zero Gravity" peaked at number 6 during its eighth week on the chart.

== Music video ==
The two characters ("the Sky Princess" on the left, "Cosmic Geisha" on the right) hold their hands out as the sphere glows in between them.

The music video premiered on March 22, 2012. It is directed by Canadian director Alon Isocianu. The video begins with Kerli hanging upside down from inside a chrysalis in a forest. Two sylphs wander by and remove her from it. The scene cuts to Kerli singing above clouds in the sky before cutting back to her, now indoors, with the two sylphs who are grooming her. A new scene cuts featuring Kerli as a character which she named "the Sky Princess" performing in front of another character portrayed by herself, "Cosmic Geisha." After the performance, Kerli walks off the stage to meet with her. They each hold out their arms before the glowing sphere in between them explodes. Many creative elements of the music video came from an early treatment written by transmedia artist Jan Lucanus and filmmaker Aurore Barry and developed with Kerli herself. Original designs of the Cosmic Geisha were created by comic book artist Mihailo Vukelic in collaboration with Creative Impulse Entertainment as part of plans for a larger Kerli-themed project.

== Track listing ==
- Digital download
1. "Zero Gravity" - 3:51
- Digital remix EP
1. "Zero Gravity (Album Version)" – 3:51
2. "Zero Gravity (Extended Version)" – 6:33
3. "Zero Gravity (Laidback Luke Remix Edit)" – 4:03
4. "Zero Gravity (Laidback Luke Remix)" – 5:25
5. "Zero Gravity (Laidback Luke Remix Instrumental)" – 5:18
6. "Zero Gravity (Almighty Edit)" – 3:35
7. "Zero Gravity (Almighty Extended)" – 6:32
8. "Zero Gravity (Ruff Loaderz Dub)" – 7:17
9. "Zero Gravity (It's The DJ Kue Edit!)" – 4:04
10. "Zero Gravity (It's The DJ Kue Extended Remix!)" – 7:05

== Charts ==
Chart (2012)	Peak position
US Billboard Hot Dance Club Songs	6
