= Diamond Hard =

2016 song by Kerli

Single by Kerli

from the EP Deepest Roots
- Released: 27 July 2016
- Recorded: 2015
- Genre: Dance
- Length: 4:01
- Label: Tiny Cute Monster
- Songwriter(s): Kerli Kõiv
- Producer(s): Kerli Kõiv

Kerli singles chronology
"Blossom" (2016)	"Diamond Hard" (2016)	"Spirit Animal" (2016)

"Diamond Hard" is a song performed by Estonian singer Kerli. It was released on July 27, 2016 as a single included in Kerli's third extended play, Deepest Roots (2016). The song is about resilience and self-empowerment. An EP containing four remixes of the song was made available on November 16, 2016 on iTunes.

== Music video ==
The music video marked Kerli's debut as director. The music video debuted the same day of the single release.

== Composition ==
"Diamond Hard" runs at a moderate tempo of 90 beats per minute. Musically, it incorporates heavy electronic beats, hits, and strings. Lyrically, it deals with resilience and self-empowerment.

== Track listing ==
=== Digital download ===
1. "Diamond Hard" 4:01

=== Remixes EP ===
1. "Diamond Hard (Reuben Keeney Remix)" 4:42

2. "Diamond Hard (Curt Reynolds Remix)" 2:58

3. "Diamond Hard (Flinch Remix)" 4:12

4. "Diamond Hard (Akcent Remix)" 3:09
