= Kerli (EP) =

2007 EP by Kerli

EP by Kerli
- Released: 16 October 2007
- Length: 14:28
- Label: Island
- Producer: David Maurice; Lester Mendez

Kerli chronology
Kerli (2007)	Love Is Dead (2008)

Kerli is the debut self-titled EP by Estonian singer-songwriter Kerli. It was released on 16 October 2007, 17 through Island Records. After being signed to Island in 2006, Kerli began producing her debut album Love Is Dead and released the EP as a teaser for the album. The music from the EP is influenced by genres such as electropop, alternative rock, and pop rock while its lyrical topics include individuality and rebellion. From the three-song release, which contains the cover of Bauhaus' "She's in Parties", "Walking on Air" and "Love Is Dead" were later included in Love Is Dead (2008). Kerli received a positive review for its musical diversity.

== Background and composition ==
In June 2006, following two failed contracts with Universal Republic Records and Stolen Transmission Estonian singer-songwriter Kerli signed a record deal with Island Records after auditioning to L.A. Reid and began the development of her then upcoming debut album Love Is Dead, whose producers include David Maurice and Lester Mendez. She released her self-titled debut extended play (EP) as a digital download on 16 October 2007 as a teaser for Love Is Dead; a promotional CD containing the songs was also released.

Lyrically, the songs included talk about individuality and rebellion. "Walking on Air" is a semi-autobiographical track which portrays "a little girl wishing to use her talents to find a better life" and has synth rhythms in its production. "Love Is Dead" talks about a lost love, with lyrics like "All I want, all I want is right here / But love don't live here anymore". Kerli has described the song as "hard and dark enough, yet beautiful and light." "She's in Parties" is a Bauhaus cover with "industrial, chugging guitars and augmented strings", compared to the original version. Both "Walking on Air" and "Love Is Dead" were later included in Love Is Dead (2008).

== Track listing ==
Kerli track listing
No.	Title	Writer(s)	Producer(s)	Length
1.	"Walking on Air"	Kerli Kõiv; Lester Mendez	Mendez	4:29
2.	"Love Is Dead"	Kõiv; Miles Gregory; David Maurice	Maurice	4:38
3.	"She's in Parties"	Daniel Ash; David J; Kevin Haskins; Peter Murphy		5:21
Total length:				14:28

== Personnel ==
- Kerli – lead vocals
- Lester Mendez – producer
- Neal Pogue – mixing
- David Maurice – mixing
