= Almost Alice =

Almost Alice: Music Inspired by the Motion Picture

Soundtrack album by various artists
- Released: March 2, 2010
- Recorded: 2009–10
- Genre: Psychedelic rock; alternative rock; pop rock; synthpop
- Length: 58:16
- Label: Buena Vista

Singles from Almost Alice
- 1. "Alice" Released: January 27, 2010; 2. "Tea Party" Released: June 15, 2010

Deluxe Edition

Almost Alice: Music Inspired by the Motion Picture is a 2010 concept album of various artists' music inspired by Tim Burton's film, Alice in Wonderland. The album is also notable for featuring songs that were inspired from quotes directly from Lewis Carroll's original 1865 novel Alice's Adventures in Wonderland. For example, both "The Lobster Quadrille" (by Franz Ferdinand) and "You Are Old, Father William" (by They Might Be Giants) are both word-for-word performances of poems from the original Alice as quoted by the Mock Turtle (the former) and Alice herself to the Caterpillar (the latter). Furthermore, "Very Good Advice" by Robert Smith is a cover of Kathryn Beaumont's "Very Good Advice" from Disney's 1951 animated adaptation of Alice in Wonderland.

The album was released by Buena Vista Records on March 2, 2010. It debuted at No. 5 on the Billboard 200 US albums chart. On June 1, 2010, iTunes released a deluxe edition of the album. The lead single, "Alice" by Avril Lavigne is played during the end credits of Alice in Wonderland and is the only song of the album featured in the film. It premiered on January 27, 2010, on the radio program On Air with Ryan Seacrest. The second single was the song "Tea Party" by Estonian pop singer Kerli. A special edition of the album with three extra songs is exclusive to Hot Topic, though it was also sold online in Mexico by the Mixup Music Store. On June 1, 2010, the special edition was released on iTunes.

== Reception ==
Professional ratings
Review scores
Source	Rating
AllMusic	3/5 stars
Entertainment Weekly	C−
Blogeroni	4/5 stars

William Ruhlmann of AllMusic focused part of his review on Lavigne's track, "Alice", describing it as "a typical piece of self-assertive adolescent pop/rock", noting that it was "ideally suited for heavy rotation on Radio Disney". Singling out "White Rabbit" and "Very Good Advice" as the album "oddities", Ruhlmann otherwise decided the album was more appealing for children, with nearly all of the songs being "schoolyard chants".

== Track listing ==
No.	Title	Artist	Length
1.	"Alice"	Avril Lavigne	3:35
2.	"The Poison"	The All-American Rejects	3:53
3.	"The Technicolor Phase"	Owl City	4:27
4.	"Her Name Is Alice"	Shinedown	3:38
5.	"Painting Flowers"	All Time Low	3:25
6.	"Where's My Angel"	Metro Station	3:39
7.	"Strange"	Tokio Hotel and Kerli	3:51
8.	"Follow Me Down"	3OH!3 featuring Neon Hitch	3:23
9.	"Very Good Advice"	Robert Smith	2:58
10.	"In Transit"	Mark Hoppus with Pete Wentz	4:02
11.	"Welcome to Mystery"	Plain White T's	4:28
12.	"Tea Party"	Kerli	3:29
13.	"The Lobster Quadrille"	Franz Ferdinand	2:08
14.	"Always Running Out of Time"	Motion City Soundtrack	3:00
15.	"Fell Down a Hole"	Wolfmother	5:04
16.	"White Rabbit"	Grace Potter and the Nocturnals	3:21

Hot Topic bonus tracks
No.	Title	Artist	Length
17.	"Seawhatweseas"	Never Shout Never	3:10
18.	"Topsy Turvy"	Family Force 5	3:25
19.	"Extreme"	Valora	3:47

iTunes bonus tracks
No.	Title	Artist	Length
17.	"You Are Old, Father William"	They Might Be Giants	2:32
18.	"Alice's Theme"	Danny Elfman	5:08

iTunes deluxe edition
No.	Title	Artist	Length
17.	"You Are Old, Father William"	They Might Be Giants	2:32
18.	"Alice's Theme"	Danny Elfman	5:08
19.	"Seawhatweseas"	Never Shout Never	3:10
20.	"Topsy Turvy"	Family Force 5	3:25
21.	"Extreme"	Valora	3:47
22.	"Tea Party" (Jason Nevins Radio Remix)	Kerli	3:11
23.	"Tea Party" (music video)	Kerli	3:28

== Charts ==
Chart (2010)	Peak position
Australian Albums Chart	32
Austrian Albums Chart	35
Canadian Albums Chart	5
Mexican Albums Chart	16
Spanish Albums Chart	74
U.S. Billboard 200	5
U.S. Billboard Top Rock Albums	1
U.S. Billboard Alternative Albums	1
U.S. Billboard Top Soundtracks	1

== See also ==
- Dick Tracy
- Rhythm of the Pride Lands
- Music Inspired by The Chronicles of Narnia: The Lion, the Witch and the Wardrobe
- Muppets: The Green Album
- Nightmare Revisited
- Frankenweenie Unleashed!
- Tron: Legacy Reconfigured
- Avengers Assemble
- The Lone Ranger: Wanted
