= Blossom (Kerli song) =

2016 song by Kerli

Single by Kerli

from the EP Deepest Roots
- Released: 29 April 2016
- Recorded: 2015
- Length: 3:59
- Label: Tiny Cute Monster
- Songwriter(s): Kerli Kõiv; Ago Teppand
- Producer(s): Ago Teppand

Kerli singles chronology
| "Feral Hearts" (2016) | "Blossom" (2016) | "Diamond Hard" (2016) |

"Blossom" is a song performed by Estonian singer Kerli. Released as a single included in Kerli's third extended play, Deepest Roots (2016), it premiered on 29 April 2016, with the music video being released one day before. A choral version of the song, titled "Blossom (The Halls of Heaven Sessions)" was released on 27 May 2016.

== Composition ==
The song is based on a soft electronic beat, complemented with pads and atmospheric instrumentation. It runs at a slow tempo of 68 BPM. On the lyrics, Kerli states that "creating this story from the perspective of a tiny seed growing underground and ultimately bursting through the spring frost to find the sun felt like the most natural thing in the world". "Blossom" deals with "survival" and "healing" themes.

== Track listing ==
=== Digital download ===
1. "Blossom" 3:59

=== Halls of Heaven Sessions ===
1. "Blossom (Halls of Heaven Sessions)" 2:34
