= Feral Hearts (song) =

2016 song by Kerli

Single by Kerli

from the EP Deepest Roots
- Released: 19 February 2016
- Recorded: 2015
- Genre: Electronic
- Length: 4:38
- Label: Tiny Cute Monster
- Songwriter(s): Kerli Kõiv; Lester Mendez
- Producer(s): Lester Mendez

Kerli singles chronology
"Build the Cities" (2015)	"Feral Hearts" (2016)	"Blossom" (2016)

"Feral Hearts" is a song performed by Estonian singer Kerli. It is a single included in Kerli's third extended play, Deepest Roots (2016). She released it on February 19, 2016, as an independent artist, but she published it on February 10 to her official SoundCloud page. It is about "returning to your roots" and finding your instincts. A music video was debuted on Kerli's official YouTube profile on February 25, 2016. An EP containing three remixes of the song was made available on iTunes on April 8.

== Release and promotion ==
Kerli first performed the song on February 18, 2016, in the medieval tower Kiek in de Kök, and, a day after, the song was released on iTunes for purchase. The music video for the song was released on February 25, with the release of a teaser on February 18 via her Instagram; on February 26, Kerli released a piano version of the song titled "Feral Hearts (The Sacred Forest Sessions)" on iTunes.

== Composition ==
"Feral Hearts" is set at a 3/4 time signature, with a fast tempo of 180 beats per minute. The equivalent of this tempo in 4/4 signature is 120 beats per minute. Musically, "Feral Hearts" incorporates strings and atmospheric instrumentation, as well as background vocals accompanying Kerli's voice throughout the chorus.

== Music video ==
The music video for "Feral Hearts" was released on February 25, 2016. Kerli designed the four characters she portrays in it: a butterfly, a mermaid, a spider, and a white stag.

== Track listing ==
=== Digital download ===
1. "Feral Hearts" - 4:38

=== The Sacred Forest Sessions ===
1. "Feral Hearts (The Sacred Forest Sessions)" - 5:03

=== Remixes EP ===
1. "Feral Hearts (Melvv Remix)" 5:04

2. "Feral Hearts (Fatum Remix)" 3:59

3. "Feral Hearts (Varien Remix)" 4:31
