= Frankenweenie (soundtrack) =

Multiple soundtrack releases

Frankenweenie: The Original Motion Picture Soundtrack is the film score for the Disney film, Frankenweenie, by Danny Elfman, and was released on September 25, 2012.

A separate soundtrack concept album titled, Frankenweenie Unleashed!: Music Inspired by the Motion Picture by various artists was also released on the same date. The packaging for Frankenweenie: Unleashed was distributed in a digipak CD format with phosphorescent cover art.

Each album was released by Walt Disney Records physically on CD and via digital download on various online platforms including the iTunes Store.

"Wonder Volt" by Kaela Kimura is the theme song for the Japanese version.

== Frankenweenie (Original Motion Picture Soundtrack) ==
=== Track listing ===
Frankenweenie (Original Motion Picture Soundtrack)

Film score by Danny Elfman
- Released: September 25, 2012
- Genre: Classical
- Length: 55:58
- Label: Walt Disney
- Producer: Tim Burton

Professional ratings
Review scores
Source	Rating
Filmtracks	4/5 stars

All tracks are written by Danny Elfman.

No.	Title	Length
1.	"Frankenweenie Disney Logo (Note: Original "When You Wish Upon a Star" melody composed by Leigh Harline; 2006–2022 Disney logo melody written and composed by Mark Mancina and co-arranged with and conducted by David Metzger)"	0:37
2.	"Main Titles"	2:19
3.	"Mr. Burgermeister/Noses Meet"	2:16
4.	"Game of Death"	2:20
5.	"The Funeral"	2:38
6.	"Electricity"	3:27
7.	"Re-Animation"	5:15
8.	"Sparky's Day Out"	1:53
9.	"Dad's Talk"	0:49
10.	"The Bride/Edgar Knows"	2:19
11.	"Invisible Fish/Search for Sparky"	4:41
12.	"A Premonition"	1:25
13.	"The Speech"	1:20
14.	"Mom's Discovery/Farewell"	1:29
15.	"Getting Ready"	2:38
16.	"Making Monsters"	6:43
17.	"Pool Monsters Attack"	1:50
18.	"Mad Monster Party"	1:58
19.	"Final Confrontation"	2:56
20.	"Happy Ending"	3:25
21.	"Alternate Main Titles"	2:18
22.	"Over the Fence"	1:15
Total length:		55:58

== Frankenweenie Unleashed! (Music Inspired by the Motion Picture) ==
Frankenweenie Unleashed! (Music Inspired by the Motion Picture)

Soundtrack album by Various artists
- Released: September 25, 2012
- Genres: Alternative rock; art punk; indie pop; indie rock; neo-psychedelia; piano rock; punk rock; industrial rock
- Length: 52:22
- Label: Walt Disney
- Producer: Mitchell Leib

Professional ratings
Review scores
Source	Rating
Allmusic	3.5/5 stars

Only the tracks "Strange Love" and "Praise Be New Holland", are actually used in the film. Artists Grace Potter, Kerli, the Plain White T's, and Robert Smith were previously featured on Almost Alice, a similar compilation album consisting of tracks from and inspired by the Tim Burton film Alice in Wonderland by various artists.

=== Background ===
Karen O was approached by the film's director Tim Burton with the intent of the singer writing a song especially for the film. The singer has said that her song, "Strange Love" was inspired by "the same era of B-movie fright film references sprinkled throughout the film. I went in the direction of exotica and calypso stylistically because it's quirky, good vibes music of that era, and when you throw in a Theremin solo, it's a marriage made in heaven. I remember Beetlejuice introducing me to the genius of Harry Belafonte's calypso record, so I wanted to give a nod to that, too." The brief line "Love, love is strange," as well as its melody, which are repeated several times in "Strange Love", are drawn directly from the 1957 No. 1 hit record, "Love Is Strange" by Mickey & Sylvia.

=== Track listing ===
No.	Title	Writer(s)	Performer(s)	Length
1.	"Strange Love"	Karen O	Karen O (from Yeah Yeah Yeahs)	3:03
2.	"Electric Heart (Stay Forever)"	Tyler Glenn	Neon Trees	4:41
3.	"Polartropic (You Don't Understand Me)"	Mark Foster	Mark Foster (from Foster the People)	4:22
4.	"Almost There"	Michael Angelakos	Passion Pit	4:16
5.	"Pet Sematary"	Dee Dee Ramone, Joey Ramone, Johnny Ramone, Daniel Rey	Plain White T's	3:46
6.	"With My Hands"	Kimbra Johnson, Damian Taylor	Kimbra	3:33
7.	"Everybody's Got a Secret"	Aaron Bruno	Awolnation	3:43
8.	"Immortal"	Kerli Koiv	Kerli	4:16
9.	"My Mechanical Friend"	Wayne Coyne, Grace Potter	Grace Potter featuring The Flaming Lips	4:16
10.	"Lost Cause"	Alexander Grant, Josh Mosser, Dan Reynolds	Imagine Dragons	3:50
11.	"Underground"	Sean Gadd, Hannah Hooper, Ryan Rabin, Andrew Wessen, Christian Zucconi	Grouplove	3:10
12.	"Building a Monster"	Alexander Grant, Skylar Grey	Skylar Grey	4:22
13.	"Witchcraft"	Cy Coleman, Carolyn Leigh	Robert Smith (from The Cure)	4:11
14.	"Praise Be New Holland"	John August, Danny Elfman	Winona Ryder	0:53
Total length:				52:22

Amazon.com bonus tracks
No.	Title	Performer(s)	Length
1.	"Minds on Fire"	Finger Eleven	3:07
2.	"Hind Legs"	Sleeper Agent	2:23

iTunes bonus tracks
No.	Title	Performer(s)	Length
1.	"This Song is a Curse"	Frank Iero	2:22
2.	"Lost in You"	The Royal Concept	4:08

Target bonus tracks
No.	Title	Performer(s)	Length
1.	"Only You"	The Pretty Reckless	3:38
2.	"Another Night on Earth"	The Veils	3:54

=== Charts ===
Year	Chart	Peak position
2012	US Billboard Soundtrack Albums	6

=== Personnel ===
"Strange Love"

- Karen O — vocals
- Jaleel Bunton – guitar, ukulele, bass, tambourine, lap steel guitar
- Yusuke Yamamoto — vibraphone, percussion, piano, synthesizer
- J. G. Thirlwell — Keyboard, electronics

"Electric Heart (Star Forever)"

- Neon Trees
  - Tyler Glenn – vocals, keyboards
  - Brandon Campbell – bass
  - Christopher Allen – guitars
  - Elaine Bradley – drums, backing vocals
- Justin Meldal-Johnsen — programming, keyboards

"Polartropic (You Don't Understand Me)"

- Mark Foster — production
- Isom Innis — mixing

"Pet Sematary"

- Dan Monahan – production
- Augie Schmidt – production
- Joe Zook – mixing

"With My Hands"

- Damian Taylor – production, mixing

"Everybody's Got A Secret"

- Aaron Bruno — production
- Eric Stenman – engineering, mixing

"Immortal"

- Kerli — leading and backing vocals
- Toby Gad — instruments, programming
- Jon Rezin – electric bass, vocal editing
- Josh Cumbee — string programming

"My Mechanical Friend"

- Grace Potter — vocals, keyboards, machine noises, engineering
- The Flaming Lips
  - Wayne Coyne — vocals,
  - Steven Drozd — bass, drums, guitars
- Rich Costey — mixing
- Chris Kaysch – assisting
- Mack Hawkins – engineering

"Lost Cause"

- Imagine Dragons
  - Dan Reynolds — writer, vocals, recording engineer
- Alex Da Kid — writer, producer
- Josh Mosser — writer, recording engineer

"Witchcraft"

- Robert Smith — voice, instruments
