= Love and Rockets discography =

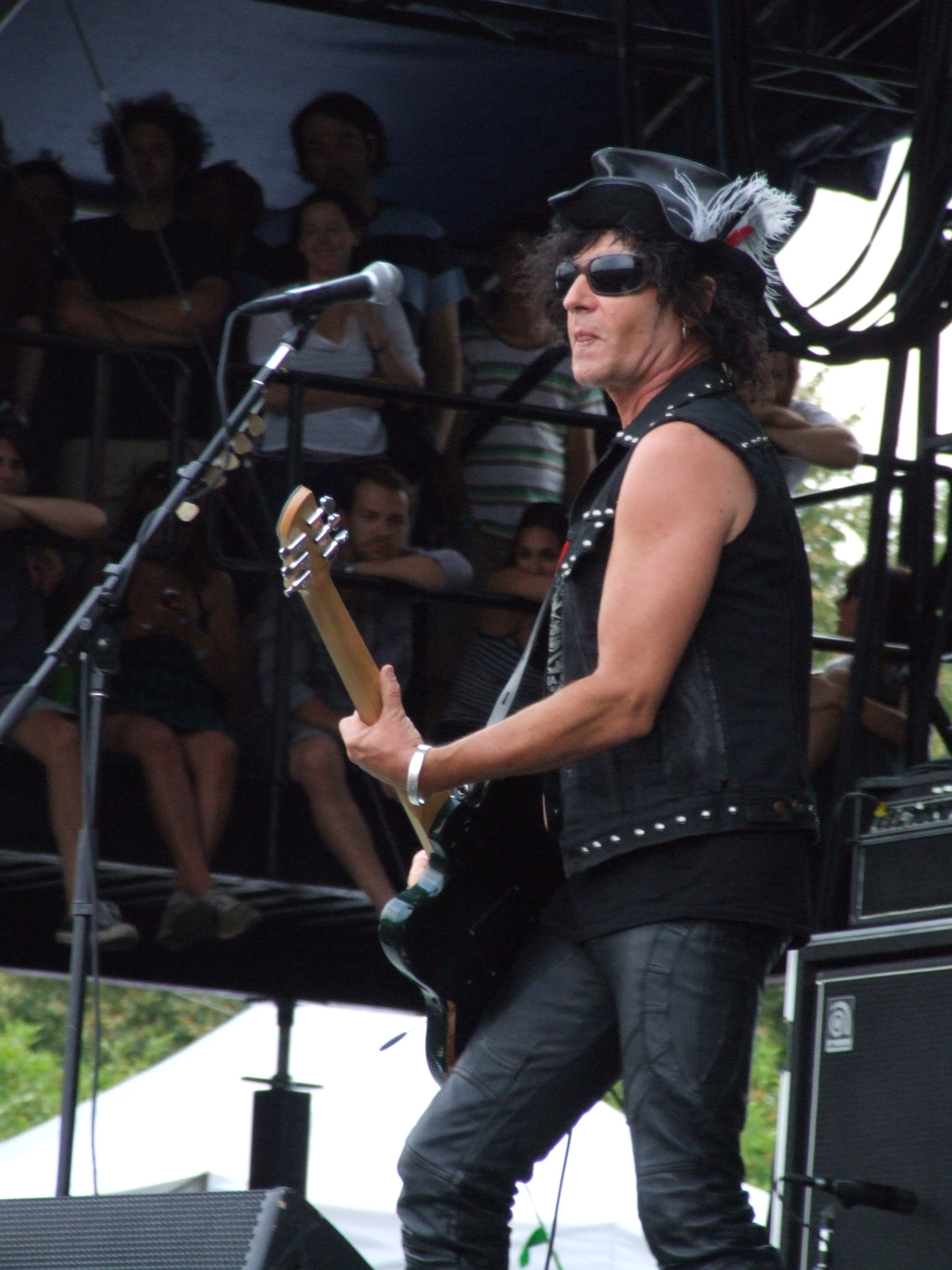
- Daniel Ash at Lollapalooza 2008.
- Studio albums: 7
- Live albums: 1
- Compilation albums: 1
- Tribute albums: 1
- Singles: 21
- Video albums: 2

The discography of Love and Rockets, an English alternative rock band, consists of seven studio albums, three compilation albums, one live album, two video albums, and 21 singles.

== Albums ==
=== Studio albums ===
List of studio albums, with selected chart positions and certifications
Title	Album details	Peak chart positions		Certifications
Title	Album details	US	CAN	Certifications
Seventh Dream of Teenage Heaven	Released: 11 October 1985; Label: Beggars Banquet	—	54	
Express	Released: 15 September 1986; Label: Beggars Banquet	72	85	
Earth, Sun, Moon	Released: 9 September 1987; Label: Beggars Banquet	64	60	
Love and Rockets	Released: 7 March 1989; Label: Beggars Banquet	14	10	MC: Platinum; RIAA: Gold
Hot Trip to Heaven	Released: 26 September 1994; Label: Beggars Banquet, American	—	—	
Sweet F.A.	Released: 19 March 1996; Label: American	172	68	
Lift	Released: 13 October 1998; Label: Red Ant	—	—	

=== Compilation albums ===
- Sorted! The Best of Love and Rockets (2003)
- Assorted! (included in the 5 Albums box set) (2013)
- My Dark Twin (2023)

=== Live albums ===
- So Alive (2003)

== Videos ==
- The Haunted Fishtank (1989)
- Sorted! The Best of Love and Rockets (2003)

== Singles ==
List of studio albums, with selected chart positions
Song	Year	Peak chart positions							Album
Song	Year	US	US Alt	US Rock	US Dance	AUS	NZ	UK	Album
"Ball of Confusion"	1985	—	x	—	—	—	—	—	Seventh Dream of Teenage Heaven
"If There's a Heaven Above"	1985	—	x	—	—	—	—	—	Seventh Dream of Teenage Heaven
"Kundalini Express"	1986	—	x	—	—	—	—	—	Express
"Yin and Yang (The Flowerpot Man)"	1986	—	x	—	—	—	—	—	Express
"All in My Mind"	1986	—	x	49	—	—	—	—	Express
"The Light"	1987	—	x	—	—	—	—	—	Earth, Sun, Moon
"No New Tale to Tell"	1987	—	x	18	—	—	—	—	Earth, Sun, Moon
"Waiting for the Flood"	1987	—	x	—	—	—	—	—	Earth, Sun, Moon
"Mirror People"	1988	—	x	—	—	—	—	—	Earth, Sun, Moon
"Lazy"	1988	—	x	—	—	—	—	—	Earth, Sun, Moon
"Motorcycle"	1989	—	20	—	—	—	—	—	Love and Rockets
"So Alive"	1989	3	1	9	20	24	16	79	Love and Rockets
"Rock & Roll Babylon"	1989	—	29	—	—	—	—	—	Love and Rockets
"No Big Deal"	1989	82	19	—	—	—	—	—	Love and Rockets
"This Heaven"	1994	—	—	—	—	—	—	—	Hot Trip to Heaven
"Body and Soul"	1994	—	—	—	—	—	—	—	Hot Trip to Heaven
"Sweet Lover Hangover"	1996	— (Note: "Sweet Lover Hangover" did not enter the Billboard Hot 100, but peaked at number 66 on the Hot 100 Airplay chart.)	10	—	—	—	—	—	Sweet F.A.
"Fever"	1996	—	—	—	—	—	—	—	Sweet F.A.
"Resurrection Hex"	1998	—	—	—	—	—	—	—	Lift
"Holy Fool"	1998	—	—	—	—	—	—	—	Lift
"R.I.P. 20C"	1998	—	—	—	—	—	—	—	Lift
"—" denotes recordings that did not chart or were not released in that territory. "x" denotes that the chart did not exist at the time.
