= Stripped (Daniel Ash album) =

Remix album by Daniel Ash
- Released: 2014
- Genre: Alternative rock, EDM
- Label: Drastic Plastic

Daniel Ash chronology
Come Alive (2005)	Stripped (2014)

Professional ratings
Review scores
Source	Rating
Allmusic	link

Stripped is Daniel Ash's fifth album and his first studio album since his 2002 release, Daniel Ash. The album features reworkings of songs from his previous work with bands Bauhaus, Tones on Tail and Love and Rockets, as well as one original track.

== Background ==
Daniel Ash had originally intended to release an album of some of his older work stripped down acoustically, but later decided that the idea was boring. Ash taught himself how to use Logic Pro and stripped down the songs electronically, then rebuilt them with elements of EDM, including dubstep, as well as elements of reggae. In 2014 he funded the album on PledgeMusic and asked fans to select the songs to be included on the album, which was released later that year by GO! Studio. The album was also reissued in 2016 by MVD Entertainment Group and Main Man Records.

== Track listing ==
1. So Alive (from the Love and Rockets album Love and Rockets)
2. Love Me (from the Love and Rockets album Express)
3. OK, This Is the Pops (from Tones on Tail EP Burning Skies)
4. All in My Mind (from the Love and Rockets album Express)
5. Too Much Choice (from the Love and Rockets album Lift)
6. No Big Deal (from the Love and Rockets album Love and Rockets)
7. Slice of Life (from the Bauhaus album Burning from the Inside)
8. Mirror People (from the Love and Rockets album Earth, Sun, Moon)
9. Christian Says (a Tones on Tail single released in 1984)
10. Come On (original track)
11. There's Only One (a Tones on Tail single released in 1982)
12. An American Dream (from the Love and Rockets album Express)
