= Sorted! The Best of Love and Rockets =

Greatest hits album by Love and Rockets
- Released: 3 June 2003
- Genre: Alternative rock, gothic rock
- Label: Beggars Banquet
- Producer: Doug DeAngelis, John Fryer, Love and Rockets, Sylvia Massy, John A. Rivers

Love and Rockets chronology
| So Alive (2003) | Sorted! The Best of Love and Rockets (2003) |

Professional ratings
Review scores
| Source | Rating |
|---|---|
| Allmusic | 4.5/5 stars |

Sorted! The Best of Love and Rockets is a greatest hits album by English alternative rock band Love and Rockets. It was released on 3 June 2003.

== Track listing ==
All tracks are written by Love and Rockets, except where noted

| No. | Title | Writer(s) | Length |
|---|---|---|---|
| 1. | "Kundalini Express" | | 5:48 |
| 2. | "The Dog-End of a Day Gone By" | | 7:36 |
| 3. | "Mirror People '88 (Single Version)" | | 3:58 |
| 4. | "Ball of Confusion (That's What the World Is Today) (Single Version)" | Barrett Strong, Norman Whitfield | 3:32 |
| 5. | "Yin and Yang (The Flowerpot Man) [Single Edit]" | | 4:18 |
| 6. | "Holiday on the Moon" | | 6:05 |
| 7. | "So Alive (Single Version)" | | 3:46 |
| 8. | "Holy Fool" | Ash, Jill Cunniff, Doug DeAngelis | 3:19 |
| 9. | "No New Tale to Tell" | | 3:24 |
| 10. | "No Big Deal (Single Version)" | | 3:55 |
| 11. | "Haunted When the Minutes Drag" | | 8:01 |
| 12. | "It Could Be Sunshine" | | 4:58 |
| 13. | "Shelf Life" | | 3:21 |
| 14. | "Sweet Lover Hangover" | | 5:06 |
| 15. | "Saudade" | | 4:57 |

== Personnel ==
Love and Rockets

- Daniel Ash – guitar
- Kevin Haskins – drums
- David J – bass guitar, artwork, concept, sleeve notes

Production

- Fin Costello – photography
- Doug DeAngelis – production
- John Dent – mastering
- John Fryer – production
- Mitch Jenkins – photography
- Love and Rockets – production
- Oscar Marzaroli – photography
- Sylvia Massy – production
- John A. Rivers – production
- Derek Tompkins – assistant
- Steve Webbon – layout design
