= So Alive =

So Alive may refer to:

- So Alive (album), a 1989 album by Love and Rockets
  - "So Alive" (Love and Rockets song), 1989
- "So Alive" (Ryan Adams song), 2004
- "So Alive" (Skepta and N-Dubz song), 2011
- So Alive, an EP by Gerard McMahon recording as G Tom Mac
- So Alive, an album by Ann Lee
- So Alive, an EP by The Product, 2012
- "So Alive", a song by Goo Goo Dolls from Boxes
