= So Alive (album) =

Live album by Love and Rockets
- Released: 13 May 2003
- Recorded: 5 December 1987, 23 March 1996
- Genre: Alternative rock
- Label: Psychobaby
- Producer: Marc Kordelos, Ritchie Rees

Love and Rockets chronology
Lift (1998)	So Alive (2003)	Sorted! The Best of Love and Rockets (2003)

Professional ratings
Review scores
Source	Rating
Allmusic	3/5 stars

So Alive is a live album by English alternative rock band Love and Rockets. It was released on 13 May 2003. It comprises two of the band's live performances: one on 5 December 1987 and the other on 23 March 1996.

== Track listing ==
All tracks are written by Love and Rockets, except where noted.

No.	Title	Writer(s)	Length
1.	"Intro"		0:25
2.	"Ball of Confusion (That's What the World Is Today)"	Norman Strong, Barrett Whitfield	4:54
3.	"Judgment Day"		4:11
4.	"Natacha"		5:19
5.	"Rock On"		3:25
6.	"Fever"		3:48
7.	"So Alive"		2:51
8.	"Use Me"		4:04
9.	"Sweet F.A."		3:30
10.	"No New Tale to Tell"		3:21
11.	"Spiked"		3:14
12.	"The Light"		5:49
13.	"Sweet Lover Hangover"		4:24
14.	"Mirror People"		4:23
15.	"Bubble Man Intro"		1:08
16.	"Seventh Dream of Teenage Heaven"		7:30
17.	"Love Me"		4:54
18.	"It Could Be Sunshine"		4:58

== Personnel ==
Love and Rockets

- Daniel Ash – guitar, vocals
- Kevin Haskins – drums
- David J – bass guitar, backing vocals

Production

- Marc Kordelos – executive production
- Ritchie Rees – executive production
- Don C. Tyler – mastering
