= Hot Trip to Heaven =

Studio album by Love and Rockets
- Released: 26 September 1994
- Genre: Ambient techno
- Length: 64:03
- Label: American
- Producer: Love and Rockets

Love and Rockets chronology
Love and Rockets (1989)	Hot Trip to Heaven (1994)	Sweet F.A. (1996)

Singles from Hot Trip to Heaven
- 1. "This Heaven" Released: September 1994; 2. "Body and Soul" Released: December 1994

Hot Trip to Heaven is the fifth studio album by British rock band Love and Rockets, released in 1994 on Beggars Banquet in the United Kingdom and American in the United States. Released after a five-year hiatus, the album saw the band drop their former gothic, alternative rock sound in favour of a hi-tech electronic, ambient direction, taking influences from ambient techno artists such as the Orb and Orbital, while retaining the band's psychedelic focus. The group first became interested in making electronic music at the start of the decade.

Hot Trip to Heaven features longer songs than Love and Rockets' earlier albums, exploring a wider tonal range. Natacha Atlas, with whom Daniel Ash and Kevin Haskins had worked with previously, adds vocals and percussion, giving the album a world music flavour. Promoted by the singles "Body and Soul" and "This Heaven", Hot Trip to Heaven was released to indifference from fans, alienating much of their core college rock audience, and was a commercial failure. However, the album received generally positive reviews from music critics, who praised the band's radical new direction, with some calling the album sensual and among the band's greatest work to date. Lead singer Daniel Ash remains proud of the album.

== Background and recording ==
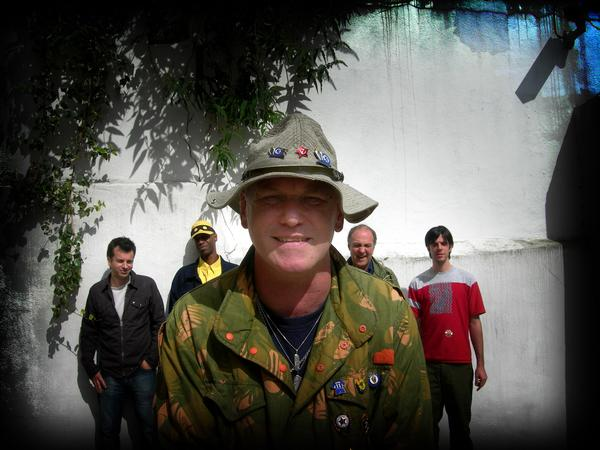
Artists such as the Orb (pictured) helped inspire the band's change in sound on Hot Trip to Heaven.

After the commercial success of alternative rock band Love and Rockets' self-titled fourth album from 1989, which produced the hit single "So Alive", which reached number 3 on the US Billboard Hot 100 chart the same year, the band took a hiatus in the early 1990s, during which the band worked on solo material and on other projects, including the band's drummer Kevin Haskins producing material by Egyptian-Belgian singer Natacha Atlas of Trans-Global Underground.

The band became intrigued in recording dance-oriented music around 1989–1990, as the band listened to the music of Happy Mondays, Spiritualized and the Orb. Furthermore, Haskins had been using drum machines for some time, whereas vocalist Daniel Ash used a $35 drum machine when recording as Tones on Tail in the early 1980s. Ash later recalled that it was primarily listening to the Orb, Orbital and Leftfield that sparked the band's interest in making electronic music: "I started to hear that stuff in the '90s. It completely seduced Love and Rockets. We completely fell in with that attitude toward music. That's why we made Hot Trip to Heaven."

After the band's break, the band began working on Hot Trip to Heaven around 1993, deliberately starting work on the album without any guitars "so that it would be something new and novel for us." This was a departure from the band's 1980s work, where the band started songs and them worked on them using guitar, bass and drums. The band self-produced Hot Trip to Heaven, while working with engineer Kevin White. While the band remained signed to Beggars Banquet in their native United Kingdom, they were dropped by the label in the United States for failing to follow-up on hit single "So Alive", and signed to Rick Rubin's label American Recordings for the release of the album.

== Music ==
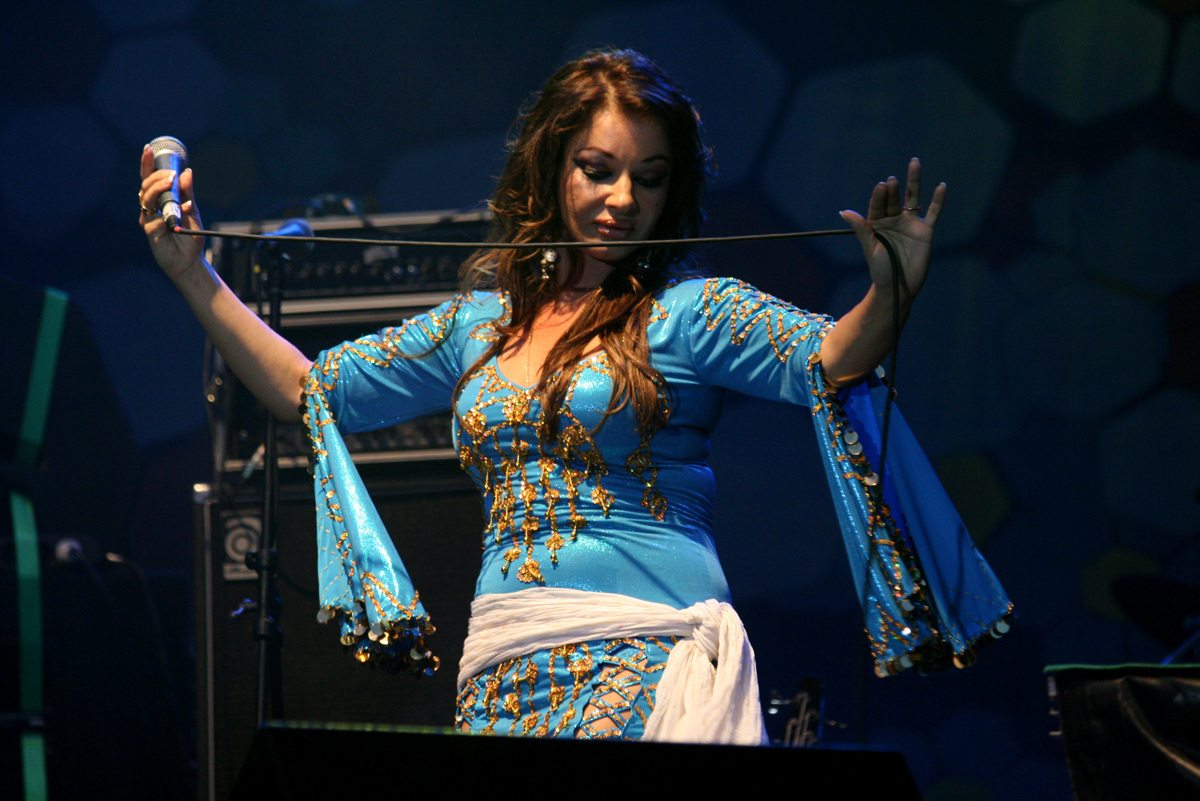
Natacha Atlas contributed additional vocals and percussion to the album.

Hot Trip to Heaven is a diverse and experimental album, radically replacing the alternative rock sound of their previous work with electronic and dance influences, including from genres such as ambient, techno, ambient techno, trip hop, and house, and incorporating elements from Britain's house and ambient dance scenes. Hot Press described the album as a highly unique hybrid of trance, ambient, techno, world and industrial music. Billboard felt the album saw the band reinventing themselves "as moody, ambient groovemeisters."

The songs on the album are longer and possess a broader tonal range in comparison to the band's previous records. Ash's guitar work on the album has been compared to Robert Fripp and Phil Manzanera, though critic Fay Wolftree felt the shaping of his guitar sound "owes more to Brian Eno and his bank of analogue synths than any player of stringed instruments." David J's bass playing largely leans towards dub, while also running with Haskins' drumming "to maintain an insistent sense of threat or promise." Natacha Atlas, who had worked with earlier in the 1990s, also contributes additional vocals and percussion to the album, which Wolftree feel largely contribute to the album's "world and ethnic feel," feeling Atlas' sporadic singing and warm percussion contrast well with Ash's voice.

=== Songs ===
The hypnotic 14-minute long "Body and Soul", inspired particularly by The Orb, opens the album, signalling the band's new direction with whispered vocals and "pulsing cycles of electrotones," before reaching a lengthy, chiming main phase "of repetitive psychedelic melodies" that pay homage to Eno and the Beatles, two of the band's biggest influences. Journalist Frank Tortorici described the song as "electronica meets the Beatles." Wolftree called the song "insistently trancey" with a conspicuous rhythm section. "Ugly", one of the songs to feature Atlas' Middle Eastern-inflicted vocals, features a "mysterious," chugging dance beat, whereas "Trip and Glide" combines Atlas' wordless vocals with "Bolan-meets-Seal atmospherics."

"This Heaven" flirts with an alternative house style reminiscent of Stereo MC's with its usage of a distorted rap and arousing samples, while its thrust beat and "breathy female panting and cooing" led Wolftree to describe it as "the nineties answer to Donna Summer's awesome dancefloor hit 'I Feel Love', as the more enlightened club DJs in London have already realised." She described the song's style as "sex trance dub or hardbeat world trance." "No Worries" features sitar sounds, while "Voodoo Baby" features tingling keys and a brooding bassline. "Be the Revolution" features wiry and wry vocals from David J and a guitar loop from Louis Metoyer. The title track, which appears halfway through the album, is the first track where Ash uses his signature fuzz bass guitar. Wolfree said of the song: "More than a little reminiscent of Bolan in Twentieth Century Boy mode plus a twinge of Jim Foetus, it’s still a fuck-off hard dance track."

== Release and reception ==
Professional ratings
Review scores
Source	Rating
AllMusic	2/5 stars
Hot Press	(favourable)
Colin Larkin	3/5 stars
New York Magazine	(favourable)
Trouser Press	(favourable)

The band's first album in five years, Hot Trip to Heaven was released on 26 September 1994 by Beggars Banquet in the UK American Recordings in the US. One writer noted the album's scheduled release date coincided with that of the Cult's self-titled album, also that band's comeback album. "Body and Soul" and "This Heaven" were released as singles, though failed to chart. Similarly, while the album did make the CMJ Top 75 Alternative Radio Play chart, reaching number 49 in January 1995, the album ultimately failed to chart highly on any alternative chart, or at all on the pop charts.

Many fans of the band were disillusioned by the album. Ash recalled the album was "commercial suicide because we were sort of known as a guitar band. I heard stories of, especially in the U.S., of people taking the CD back and saying, 'This isn't Love and Rockets. I want my money back'." It was also reported that fans of ambient and techno music felt the album's "spacious dance tracks" were compromised by the inclusion of vocals. However, the album was released to generally positive reviews. Fay Wolftree of Hot Press said Hot Trip to Heaven was "their most mature and cohesive work to date" and "the sex album of the year," citing the album's "sheer throbbing sensuality," and concluding: "Put simply, if Hot Trip To Heaven doesn’t make your body want to dance or make love (or both) you’re dead."

"We don't see what makes [the album] any worse than, say, funk-futurist Bill Laswell's recent exploits or even the chill-out godhead Aphex Twin."

— New York Magazine, 1994

Greg Fasolino and Ira Robbins of Trouser Press wrote: "Beyond the simple surprise of resurrection, Love and Rockets' Hot Trip to Heaven is a radical rethink." They said the album was an unusual case of a band creating "something vital and new after such an extended hibernation," and praised the band's "penchant for diversity [working] hand in hand with the band's fresh, creative ideas." New York Magazine called the album "hypnotic, glistening, dark and crashing–everything you'd expect from the musician side of goth rock progenitors, Bauhaus [Love and Rockets' previous band.]" AllMusic's Stephen Thomas Erlewine was less receptive, saying "they sound like they're trying to figure out what the hell is going on," though colleague Bill Cassel wrote that the album, "though flawed, boasted strong songwriting and an intriguing mix of electronics and old-fashioned instruments."

=== Legacy and aftermath ===
Hot Trip to Heaven has been hailed in retrospect by some critics in ways it had not been upon its release. Chris Molanphy of CMJ New Music Monthly wrote in 1998 that the album reimagined the band "as an electronica collective before that term had been coined." Meanwhile, Westword called it one of Ash's "best and most interesting albums," later noting in 2013 that "Love and Rockets all but committed career suicide with its daring, largely synth-driven 1994 album Hot Trip to Heaven, but like OMD's Dazzle Ships, the project is coming to be seen as a masterpiece ahead of its time." Sandy Masuo of the Los Angeles Times wrote that with Hot Trip to Heaven, "the group demonstrated that the suave, gritty pop it's cultivated is as effective stretched across wide, ambient spaces as it is compressed into more concise, rock-related forms." In 2002, critic Dave Thompson praised Hot Trip To Heaven, saying it "should have been Love And Rockets' biggest album yet."

Ash reflected on Hot Trip in Heaven in 2013, saying "as a band we needed to do that to keep it fresh for us. But, you know, I was hoping it was going to be our Dark Side of the Moon. It was either going to be that, or it was going to be a flop. Unfortunately it was a flop. But I'm still proud of the record." American Recordings persuaded Love and Rockets to return to a more guitar-based alternative rock sound on their next album, 1996's Sweet F.A., which helped retrieve some of the band's earlier fans who felt puzzled by Hot Trip to Heaven, before further exploring electronic music on their swan song, 1998's Lift, where the band had "free reign [sic] to tinker and experiment" after creating their own label.

== Track listing ==
All tracks are written by Love and Rockets (Daniel Ash, David J, Kevin Haskins).

No.	Title	Length
1.	"Body and Soul (Parts 1 & 2)"	14:14
2.	"Ugly"	7:25
3.	"Trip and Glide"	5:19
4.	"This Heaven"	7:06
5.	"No Worries"	7:13
6.	"Hot Trip to Heaven"	7:34
7.	"Eclipse"	2:18
8.	"Voodoo Baby"	3:25
9.	"Be the Revolution"	6:43
10.	"Set Me Free"	2:44

== Personnel ==
- Daniel Ash – guitar, saxophone, and vocals
- David J – bass and vocals, harmonica
- Kevin Haskins – drums and synthesizers
