= Go! (Tones on Tail song) =

1984 song by Tones on Tail

Song by Tones on Tail
- Language: English
- Genre: New wave; dance-punk; post-punk
- Songwriters: Daniel Ash, Glenn Campling, Kevin Haskins
- Producer: Tones on Tail

"Go!" is a song by English post-punk band Tones on Tail.

The song was initially a hit in dance clubs but made a number of appearances in popular culture in later years. In 1990, American electronic musician Moby used a sample of it in his 1990 dance hit of the same title. In 1997, it was featured in the film Grosse Pointe Blank and appeared on the second volume of the soundtrack. The song was also notably featured in the 2003 cult film Party Monster.

== Single release ==
"Lions"/"Go!"
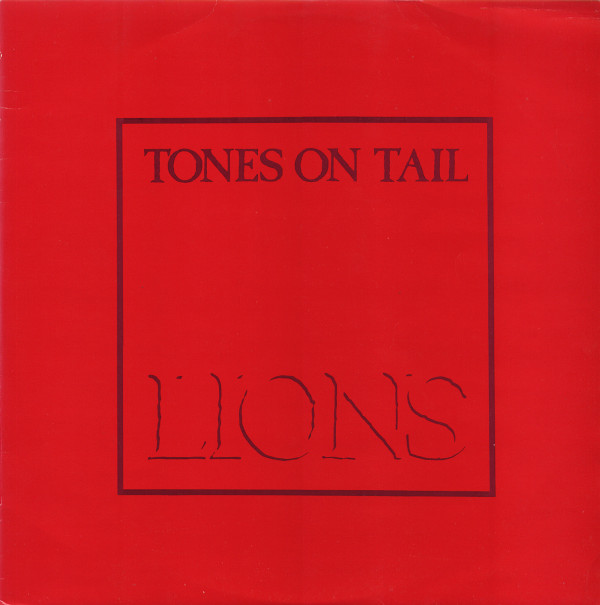

Single by Tones on Tail
- A-side: "Lions"
- B-side: "Go!"
- Released: 1984
- Genre: New wave; dance-punk; post-punk
- Length: 2:33 ("Lions" B-side version) 3:21 (7" single version) 4:33 (12" version, "Club Mix")
- Label: Beggars Banquet
- Songwriters: Daniel Ash, Glenn Campling, Kevin Haskins
- Producer: Tones on Tail

Tones on Tail singles chronology
"Performance" (1984)	"Lions" / "Go!" (1984)

"Go!" was initially released as the B-side to their May 1984 single "Lions", which originally appeared on the band's only studio album, Pop, released in the same year. This version of "Go!" has a running time of 2:33, although the 12" single version utilizes the 'Club Mix', with a running time of 4:33.

"Go!" was eventually released as a single in its own right, with a running time of 3:21.

== Critical reception ==
AllMusic called the song "one of the defining moments of early-'80s new wave dance" that "remains a wonderful atypical dancefloor smash".

== In popular culture ==
"Go!" appears in the following:

- It was used in the Beverly Hills, 90210 episode "U4EA" (the song plays while Brandon and Emily are dancing at a downtown Los Angeles rave).
- In a 2008 commercial by the Ford Motor Company for their Mercury Mariner.
- It was used in the 1991 film Career Opportunities, which starred Frank Whaley and Jennifer Connelly.
- During the class reunion disco scene in the 1997 film Grosse Pointe Blank. which starred John Cusack, Minnie Driver, and Dan Aykroyd.
- The scene in the 2003 film Party Monster where Michael and company pile into a truck in which there is a party, driven by a minor character played by Marilyn Manson.
- In the Stranger Things season 2 episode "Chapter Three: The Pollywog," Steve Harrington and Billy Hargrove face off during a game of basketball.
- In the Say Nothing episode "The Cause", the song appears during a bank robbery scene.
- Additionally, "Go!" was used in the trailer for the second season of Rick and Morty on Adult Swim.
