= Everything! (Tones on Tail album) =

Compilation album by Tones on Tail
- Released: April 7, 1998
- Length: 115:22
- Label: Beggars Banquet Records

Tones on Tail chronology
Tones on Tail (1990)	Everything! (1998)	Something! (1998)

Professional ratings
Review scores
Source	Rating
AllMusic	3.5/5 stars

Everything! is a compilation album by British post-punk band Tones on Tail, released in 1998 as a double CD.

The first disc features the original Pop album, while the second disc collects the Burning Skies and Tones on Tail EPs, along with the "There's Only One!", "Performance", "Lions" and "Christian Says" singles. The order of songs "When You're Smiling" and "You, the Night and the Music" was reversed on this compilation. Included as a bonus was a live performance of Elvis Presley's "Heartbreak Hotel" (the only officially released Tones on Tail live recording), followed by a radio interview with Daniel Ash.

A handful of alternate mixes were not released as part of this collection: the radio edits of "Go!" and "Burning Skies", as well as an extended mix of "Twist", were released on the promo EP Something!.

"Copper" was originally designated as playable at either 45 or 33 1/3 RPM, as it was originally released on vinyl; the 45 RPM version of the song is included in this set.

== Reception ==
Writing for AllMusic, critic Ned Raggett said that the need for a complete compilation of Tones on Tail work "was long overdue". Describing the group's underground hit "Go!", he said: "It remains a wonderful, atypical dancefloor smash, with Ash's loopy 'ya-ya' chorus, Haskins' nutty percussion patterns, Campling's great fuzz bassline, and more all coming together in weird and fun ways".

== Track listing ==
=== Disc One ===
All tracks are written by Tones on Tail.

No.	Title	Length
1.	"Lions"	3:57
2.	"War"	3:18
3.	"Happiness"	3:08
4.	"The Never Never (Is Forever)"	3:21
5.	"Performance"	4:12
6.	"Slender Fungus"	3:35
7.	"Movement of Fear"	3:51
8.	"Real Life"	5:06
9.	"Rain"	8:27

=== Disc Two ===
All tracks are written by Tones on Tail, except for "Heartbreak Hotel" by Mae Boren Axton, Tommy Durden and Elvis Presley.

No.	Title	Length
10.	"Go! (Club Mix)"	4:27
11.	"Christian Says"	3:42
12.	"Twist"	5:10
13.	"Burning Skies"	6:27
14.	"OK, This Is the Pops"	3:03
15.	"You, the Night and the Music" (instrumental)	5:00
16.	"When You're Smiling" (instrumental)	5:47
17.	"There's Only One!"	4:03
18.	"Now We Lustre"	4:29
19.	"A Bigger Splash"	4:31
20.	"Copper"	3:06
21.	"Means of Escape"	3:51
22.	"Instrumental"	3:29
23.	"Performance (7″ Version)"	3:12
24.	"Shakes"	3:54
25.	"Heartbreak Hotel (Live)" (Elvis Presley cover)	12:17

==== Notes ====
- Tracks 1–9 from the Pop studio album (1984)
- Track 10 from the "Lions" single (1984)
- Tracks 11–12 from the "Christian Says" single (1984)
- Tracks 13–16 from the Burning Skies EP (1983)
- Tracks 17–18 from the "There's Only One!" single (1982)
- Tracks 19–22 from the Tones on Tail EP (1982)
- Tracks 23–24 from the "Performance" single (1984)
- Track 25 from the Night Music compilation (1987)
