= The Haunted Fishtank =

Video by Love and Rockets
- Released: 1989
- Genre: Alternative rock

Love and Rockets chronology
Love and Rockets (1989)	The Haunted Fishtank (1989)	Hot Trip to Heaven (1994)

Professional ratings
Review scores
Source	Rating
Allmusic	4/5 stars

The Haunted Fishtank is a VHS video tape and LaserDisc by English alternative rock band Love and Rockets. It was released in 1989 and comprises nine of the band's music videos along with the video for "The Bubblemen Are Coming" by the band's side project The Bubblemen.

== Track listing ==
1. "Ball of Confusion" – 3:31
2. "Yin and Yang (The Flowerpot Man)" – 4:17
3. "All in My Mind" – 4:43
4. "The Light" – 4:01
5. "No New Tale to Tell" – 3:54
6. "Mirror People" – 3:52
7. "The Dog - End of a Day Gone By" – 5:40
8. "Motorcycle" – 3:36
9. "So Alive" – 4:06
10. "The Bubblemen Are Coming" – 4:03
