= FTD =

FTD may refer to:

== People ==
- Frederick Thomas Dalton (1855–1927), British caricaturist

== Places ==
- Fak Tha District, Uttaradit Province, Thailand
- Fatehabad Chandrawatiganj Junction railway station, in Madhya Pradesh, India

== Music ==
- Follow That Dream Records, a Sony label for re-issuing Elvis Presley recordings
- Follow That Dream (band), a Dutch pop band

=== Instruments ===
- Fender Telecaster Deluxe, an electric guitar
- Fender Tweed Deluxe, a guitar amplifier

=== Songs ===
- "Festival Te Deum", an 1872 composition by Arthur Sullivan
- "From This Day", a 1999 single by American heavy metal band Machine Head
- Foolish Thing Desire, a 1992 song off the eponymous Daniel Ash album Foolish Thing Desire
- Fixin' to Die, 2011 cover of 1940 song Fixin' To Die Blues, off the eponymous album by G. Love, Fixin' To Die

=== Albums ===
- Fixin' To Die, 2011 album by G. Love
- Foolish Thing Desire, 1992 album by Daniel Ash
- From The Depths, 2012 album from British progressive death metal band Karybdis

== Medicine ==
- Formal thought disorder
- Frontotemporal dementia

== Sports ==
- FC Tytan Donetsk, a Ukrainian football team
- FK Tekstilac Derventa, a Bosnian football club

== Technology ==
- Field test display
- Flight training device

== Other uses ==
- Failure to deliver
- Federal Territory Day in Malaysia
- Financial Times Deutschland, a German financial newspaper
- Florists' Transworld Delivery, a floral wire service, retailer and wholesaler
- Foreign Technology Division, a former division of the United States Air Force
- From The Depths, a highly detailed science fiction naval engineering and strategy game
