= Pop (Tones on Tail album) =

Studio album by Tones on Tail
- Released: 6 April 1984
- Recorded: December 1983
- Studio: Beck, Wellingborough, England; Rockfield, Monmouth, Wales; RG Jones, London, England
- Genre: Post-punk, gothic rock
- Label: Beggars Banquet
- Producer: Tones on Tail

Tones on Tail chronology
Burning Skies (1983)	Pop (1984)	Tones on Tail (1985)

Singles from Pop
- 1. "Performance" Released: 1984; 2. "Lions" Released: 1984

Pop is the only studio album by the English post-punk band Tones on Tail, a side project of the Bauhaus members Daniel Ash and Kevin Haskins (who later went on to form Love and Rockets with David J), and the Bauhaus roadie Glenn Campling. It was released on 6 April 1984 by Beggars Banquet Records.

== Critical reception ==
Professional ratings
Review scores
Source	Rating
AllMusic	4/5 stars

Trouser Press opined, "while Pop [...] reveals some draggy recidivist Bauhaus tendencies, it also has real songs of modern music that show taste, delicacy and moderate imagination". Writing for AllMusic, Ned Raggett called it "an impressive, wide-ranging effort collaging a range of influences into an inspired, often unpredictable experience".

Dave Thompson, in Alternative Rock, considered the album "more serviceable ideas than realized majesty", but nonetheless a recording that "holds its place in time".

Erica Bettina Wexler of Spin wrote, "There is something elusive and haunting about their music. This first album provides no immediate hooks or grooves, no instant good time. But give a serious two-ear listen, and you'll be surprised by its hypnotic power."

== Track listing ==
All tracks are written by Daniel Ash, Glenn Campling and Kevin Haskins. All lyrics by Ash.

Side one
No.	Title	Length
1.	"Lions"	3:57
2.	"War"	3:18
3.	"Happiness"	3:08
4.	"The Never Never (Is Forever)"	3:21
5.	"Performance"	4:12

Side two
No.	Title	Length
1.	"Slender Fungus"	3:35
2.	"Movement of Fear"	3:51
3.	"Real Life"	5:06
4.	"Rain"	8:27

== Personnel ==
Credits adapted from Everything! CD liner notes.

Tones on Tail

- Daniel Ash
- Glenn Campling
- Kevin Haskins

Additional musicians

- Juan Pedro Diego Ignatius Barraclough y Valls – rhythm guitar on "War"
- Caroline Lavelle – cello on "Performance"

Technical

- Tones on Tail – producers
- Ted Sharp – engineer (A3 and B1–B4)
- Derek Tompkins – engineer (A3 and B1–B4)
- Louis Austin – engineer (A5)
- Mr. Atlas – cover photo
