= Coming Down (album) =

Studio album by Daniel Ash
- Released: September 1990
- Genre: Alternative rock
- Length: 42:04
- Label: Beggars Banquet
- Producer: John Fryer, Daniel Ash, John A. Rivers

Daniel Ash chronology
Coming Down (1991)	Foolish Thing Desire (1992)

Coming Down is the first solo album by former Bauhaus, Tones on Tail, and Love and Rockets guitar player Daniel Ash, released by Beggars Banquet in September 1990. The first single, "This Love", was a number two hit on the Billboard Modern Rock Tracks chart in the United States. Natasha Atlas sings on many of the album's tracks.

The album peaked at No. 109 on the Billboard 200.

== Critical reception ==
Professional ratings
Review scores
Source	Rating
AllMusic	3.5/5 stars
The Encyclopedia of Popular Music	3/5 stars
Entertainment Weekly	A−
MusicHound Rock: The Essential Album Guide	3/5 stars
Q	2/5 stars
The Rolling Stone Album Guide	2.5/5 stars

Entertainment Weekly called the album "insidiously listenable — all thick, pulsating drums and sinewy melodies, topped by Ash’s studio-processed and thus inhuman-sounding vocals." Trouser Press wrote that the album "takes off in a bunch of different directions, from sedate cocktail swing to low-key salsa (!) to somber atmospherics to jittering dance noise." The Buffalo News praised the "furtive, moody, electronically draped reflections on reality and romance." Q described it as "sometimes playful, sometimes moody tinkering [that] is for close friends and relatives only".

== Track listing ==
1. "Blue Moon" (Richard Rodgers, Lorenz Hart) 0:50
2. "Coming Down Fast" 2:54
3. "Walk This Way" (Ash, Tito Puente) 3:01
4. "Closer to You" 3:40
5. "Day Tripper" (John Lennon, Paul McCartney) 3:11
6. "This Love" 3:45
7. "Blue Angel" 3:45
8. "Me and My Shadow" (Dave Dreyer, Billy Rose, Al Jolson) 4:34
9. "Candy Darling" 3:45
10. "Sweet Little Liar" 3:55
11. "Not So Fast" 3:27
12. "Coming Down" 5:17

== Personnel ==
- Daniel Ash: Vocals, guitars (all tracks), bass (tracks 1, 2–5 and 8–11), keyboards (track 1), saxophone (track 8), drum programming (track 8)
- Natacha Atlas: Vocals (tracks 1, 3–6, 7, 8, 11 and 12), bass (track 3), keyboards (track 3)
- Sylvan Richardson: Bass (track 6)
- John A. Rivers: Keyboards (track 6), drum programming (track 10)
- Robin Jones: Percussion (track 3)
- Kevin Haskins: Sampler (track 3), drums (track 4)
- Kathy Schaer: Snapping (track 4)
- Leo Casey: Cello (track 10)
