= Come Alive (Daniel Ash album) =

Live album by Daniel Ash
- Released: 2005
- Genre: Alternative rock
- Label: Psychobaby Records

Daniel Ash chronology
Daniel Ash (2002)	Come Alive (2005)	Stripped (2014)

Professional ratings
Review scores
Source	Rating
Allmusic	link

Come Alive is Daniel Ash's first solo live album and was recorded in early 2002 at The Galaxy Theater in Santa Ana, California, and Slim's in San Francisco, California. The setlist features songs from Ash's time with Love and Rockets, Tones on Tail and Bauhaus as well as his solo career.

== Track listing ==
1. Come Alive
2. Trouble
3. Walk on the Moon
4. Get Out of Control
5. Sweet FA
6. Spooky
7. So Alive
8. Ghost Writer
9. Christian Says
10. Mirror People
11. Slice of Life
12. An American Dream
13. Coming Down
14. OK This Is the Pops
15. Go

Performers: Daniel Ash: Guitar and Vocals, John Desalvo: Drums, Mike Peoples: Bass
