= Come Alive =

Come Alive may refer to:

== Music ==
- Come Alive (Daniel Ash album), 2005
- Come Alive (Paulini album), 2015
- Come Alive (Mark Schultz album), 2009

=== Songs ===
- "Come Alive" (Paris Hilton song), 2014
- "Come Alive (The War of the Roses)", a 2009 song by Janelle Monáe
- "Come Alive" (Netsky song), 2012
- "Come Alive", a song by Biohazard from Reborn in Defiance, 2012
- "Come Alive", a song by Gotthard from Domino Effect, 2007
- "Come Alive", a song by Hurricane No. 1 from Only the Strongest Will Survive, 1999
- "Come Alive", a song by Jackson Wang from Magic Man, 2022
- "Come Alive", a song by Jeremy Camp from Reckless, 2013
- "Come Alive", a song by Leona Lewis from Glassheart, 2012
- "Come Alive," a song by Hugh Jackman from The Greatest Showman, 2017
- "Come Alive", a song by Madonna from Madame X, 2019
- "Come Alive", a song by Pendulum, 2021
