= Daniel Ash (album) =

Studio album by Daniel Ash
- Released: 2002
- Genre: Alternative rock, alternative dance
- Label: Psychobaby Records

Daniel Ash chronology
Foolish Thing Desire (1992)	Daniel Ash (2002)	Come Alive (2005)

Professional ratings
Review scores
Source	Rating
Allmusic	3/5 stars

Daniel Ash is the third solo album from former Bauhaus, Tones on Tail, and Love and Rockets guitar player Daniel Ash. The album marks a departure from Ash's musical style as he experiments with electronica and dance elements in addition to his well-known groove rock guitar style of earlier works.

== Track listing ==
1. Hollywood Fix
2. The Money Song
3. Mastermind
4. Come Alive
5. Ghost Writer
6. Kid 2000
7. Chelsea
8. Burning Man
9. Spooky
10. Sea Glass
11. Trouble
12. Walk on the Moon
13. Rattlesnake
14. Lights Out (hidden track)
