= Express (album) =

Studio album by Love and Rockets
- Released: 15 September 1986
- Recorded: Woodbine Street Studios, in the town of Leamington Spa, in Warwickshire county, England
- Genre: Alternative rock; neo-psychedelia
- Length: 40:08 (original LP); 70:18 (2001 reissue)
- Label: Beggars Banquet
- Producer: John A. Rivers, Love and Rockets

Love and Rockets chronology
Seventh Dream of Teenage Heaven (1985)	Express (1986)	Earth, Sun, Moon (1987)

Singles from Express
- 1. "Kundalini Express" Released: 2 June 1986; 2. "Yin and Yang (The Flowerpot Man)" Released: 8 September 1986; 3. "All in My Mind" Released: November 1986

Express is the second studio album by English rock band Love and Rockets. It was released on 15 September 1986 on Beggars Banquet Records. An even greater departure from the band members' previous work as Bauhaus, the album's fusion of underground rock with pop stylings can be seen as an early example of alternative rock music, a genre that reached mainstream popularity in the early 1990s.

"Kundalini Express" was featured in the 1986 Italian horror film Demons 2 and appeared on an episode of the T.V. show Miami Vice.

== Reception ==
Professional ratings
Review scores
Source	Rating
AllMusic	4.5/5 stars
Kerrang!	4/5 stars

In their retrospective review, AllMusic gave the album four-and-a-half stars out of five, writing, "rich in sonic detail, the neo-psychedelic Express offers a listening experience like no other album – guitars spiral to dizzying heights from beds of sound, arrangements swirl, songs change and mutate."

== Release history ==
In 2001, the album was remastered and expanded to include two single remixes and several contemporaneous B-sides, including a cover of Pink Floyd's "Lucifer Sam". Two short experimental pieces that had been found on the studio tape masters labelled as "B Side #1" and "B Side #2" were also added. "Ball of Confusion" was released before Seventh Dream of Teenage Heaven, but since the USA mix could not be fit on the reissue of that album, it was appended to the Express reissue.

== Track listings ==
All tracks are written by Love and Rockets, except "Ball of Confusion", written by Barrett Strong and Norman Whitfield.

Original LP release
No.	Title	Lyrics	Length
1.	"It Could Be Sunshine"	Daniel Ash	5:00
2.	"Kundalini Express"	David J	5:47
3.	"All in My Mind"	Ash	4:45
4.	"Life in Laralay"	J	3:35
5.	"Yin and Yang (The Flowerpot Man)"	Ash, J	5:56
6.	"Love Me"	Ash	3:54
7.	"All in My Mind (Acoustic)"	Ash	5:08
8.	"An American Dream"	Ash	6:04

Original US and UK CD releases
No.	Title	Lyrics	Length
1.	"Angels and Devils"		6:00
2.	"It Could Be Sunshine"	Ash	5:00
3.	"Kundalini Express"	J	5:47
4.	"All in My Mind"	Ash	4:45
5.	"Life in Laralay"	J	3:35
6.	"Ball of Confusion (Special Mix)"		6:16
7.	"Holiday on the Moon"	J	6:01
8.	"Yin and Yang (The Flowerpot Man) (Remix)"	Ash, J	6:06
9.	"Love Me"	Ash	3:54
10.	"All in My Mind (Acoustic Version)"	Ash	5:08
11.	"An American Dream"	Ash	6:04

1986 US vinyl release
No.	Title	Lyrics	Length
1.	"It Could Be Sunshine"	Ash	5:00
2.	"Kundalini Express"	J	5:47
3.	"All in My Mind"	Ash	4:45
4.	"Life in Laralay"	J	3:35
5.	"Ball of Confusion"		6:16
6.	"Yin and Yang (The Flowerpot Man) (Remix)"	Ash, J	6:06
7.	"Love Me"	Ash	3:54
8.	"All in My Mind (Acoustic)"	Ash	5:08
9.	"An American Dream"	Ash	6:04

1986 US cassette release
No.	Title	Lyrics	Length
1.	"It Could Be Sunshine"	Ash	5:00
2.	"Kundalini Express"	J	5:47
3.	"All in My Mind"	Ash	4:45
4.	"Life in Laralay"	J	3:35
5.	"Ball of Confusion (US Mix)"	Ash, J	6:16
6.	"Yin and Yang (The Flowerpot Man)"	Ash, J	6:06
7.	"Love Me"	Ash	3:54
8.	"All in My Mind (Acoustic)"	Ash	5:08
9.	"An American Dream"	Ash	6:04

2001 remastered reissue
No.	Title	Lyrics	Length
1.	"It Could Be Sunshine"	Ash	4:58
2.	"Kundalini Express"	J	5:52
3.	"All in My Mind"	Ash	4:43
4.	"Life in Laralay"	J	3:32
5.	"Yin and Yang (The Flowerpot Man)"	Ash, J	5:56
6.	"Love Me"	Ash	3:54
7.	"All in My Mind (Acoustic)"	Ash	5:04
8.	"An American Dream"	Ash	6:09
9.	"Angels and Devils"		6:10
10.	"Holiday on the Moon"	J	6:07
11.	"Lucifer Sam"	Syd Barrett	3:21
12.	"B Side No. 1"		1:16
13.	"B Side No. 2"		1:31
14.	"Yin and Yang (The Flowerpot Man) (Remix)"	Ash, J	5:29
15.	"Ball of Confusion (USA Mix)"		6:16

== Personnel ==
Love and Rockets

- Daniel Ash – guitar, saxophone, vocals
- David J – bass guitar, vocals
- Kevin Haskins – drums, synthesizer

Additional personnel

- Allan Baker – choir master
- Alan Brookes – choir vocalist on "An American Dream"
- James Lowry – choir vocalist on "An American Dream"
- John A. Rivers – additional keyboards
- Robert Willey – choir vocalist on "An American Dream"

Production

- Love and Rockets – sleeve design
- Mitch Jenkins – sleeve photography
