= Earth, Sun, Moon =

Studio album by Love and Rockets
- Released: 9 September 1987
- Genre: Indie rock
- Length: 49:55
- Label: Beggars Banquet, Big Time
- Producer: Derek "Guru" Tompkins, Love and Rockets

Love and Rockets chronology
Express (1986)	Earth, Sun, Moon (1987)	Love and Rockets (1989)

Singles from Earth, Sun, Moon
- 1. "The Light" Released: June 1987; 2. "No New Tale to Tell" Released: September 1987; 3. "Waiting for the Flood" Released: December 1987; 4. "Mirror People" Released: March 1988; 5. "Lazy" Released: June 1988

Professional ratings
Review scores
Source	Rating
Allmusic	4.5/5 stars
Kerrang!	5/5 stars

Earth, Sun, Moon is the third studio album by English alternative rock band Love and Rockets, released in 1987 on Beggars Banquet.

The album was remastered, but not expanded (unlike their previous albums), in 2001. Most of the tracks that would have appeared on an expanded edition were included on disc 5 of their 2013 CD box set 5 Albums.

== Background ==
While the album continued in a psychedelic vein, the band also experimented with a folk-based indie rock sound. Vestiges of a gothic rock sound remained, but the band continued to sound less like their previous group, Bauhaus.

Earth, Sun, Moon featured Love and Rockets' first hit, "No New Tale to Tell". The song reached number 18 on the US Mainstream Rock chart.

A flurry of recording activity bridges Earth, Sun, Moon to the self-titled album that followed just over a year later. The punched-up 1988 single version of "Mirror People", released as a follow-up to "No New Tale to Tell", can be found on 2003's hits collection Sorted! The Best of Love and Rockets, while the extended "Mirror People ‘88 (Full Length Version)" can be found on disc 5 of 2013's 5 Albums CD box set. The B-side of "Mirror People" ("David Lanfair"), in which a somewhat bumbling fan tapes himself asking a number of one-sided interview questions—mostly about Bauhaus—over which the band themselves play a gentle but characteristic instrumental track, can also be found on 5 Albums, as can the contents of the following novelty 12" single by the band's alter ego The Bubblemen. The live B-sides of "No New Tale to Tell" ("Seventh Dream of Teenage Heaven" and "Love Me", recorded live on 6 December 1987) are available on 5 Albums along with several previously unreleased songs from that concert. The newer, cleaner remix of "Dog-End of a Day Gone By" released to promote the 1988 international reissue of Seventh Dream of Teenage Heaven and featured as a B-side to the "Lazy" single can also be found as the audio track for the music video which is included on the band's compilation DVD Sorted!. The other B-side from "Lazy", a devolved version of "Waiting For The Flood" called "The Purest Blue", appears on their 1989 self-titled album.

== Track listings ==
All tracks are written by Love and Rockets.

Original LP release
No.	Title	Lyrics	Length
1.	"Mirror People"	Daniel Ash	4:05
2.	"The Light"	Ash	4:16
3.	"Welcome Tomorrow"	Ash, David J	3:36
4.	"No New Tale to Tell"	J	3:26
5.	"Here on Earth"	J	3:10
6.	"Lazy"	Ash	3:12
7.	"Waiting for the Flood"	J	3:58
8.	"Rain Bird"	J	3:17
9.	"The Telephone Is Empty"	Ash	3:59
10.	"Everybody Wants to Go to Heaven"	J	5:13
11.	"Earth, Sun, Moon"	Ash	3:34
12.	"Youth"	Ash	4:42
13.	"Mirror People (Slow Version)"	Ash	4:26

"Mirror People (Slow Version)" is only available on the CD releases.

== Personnel ==
- Daniel Ash – guitar, saxophone, and vocals
- David J – bass and vocals
- Kevin Haskins – drums and synthesizers
