= Poptone =

English–American post-punk band

- Origin: Los Angeles, U.S.
- Genres: Post-punk
- Years active: 2017–present
- Members: Daniel Ash; Kevin Haskins; Diva Dompé
- Website: www.facebook.com/poptonemusic/ www.instagram.com/poptonetheband/

Poptone is an English–American post-punk band formed in early 2017 by British musicians Daniel Ash and Kevin Haskins with Diva Dompé (Haskins' daughter). Ash and Haskins were both formerly of the bands Bauhaus, Tones on Tail, Love and Rockets, and the Bubblemen.

In their initial press release, the band announced: "Daniel and Kevin are revisiting their storied catalogue and presenting in a fresh, new direction, to combine their histories with a reinvigorated outlook for new tours and potentially new music."

An eponymous live album recorded at various stops on the tour was self-released on 17 December 2017, funded through PledgeMusic.

== Reception ==
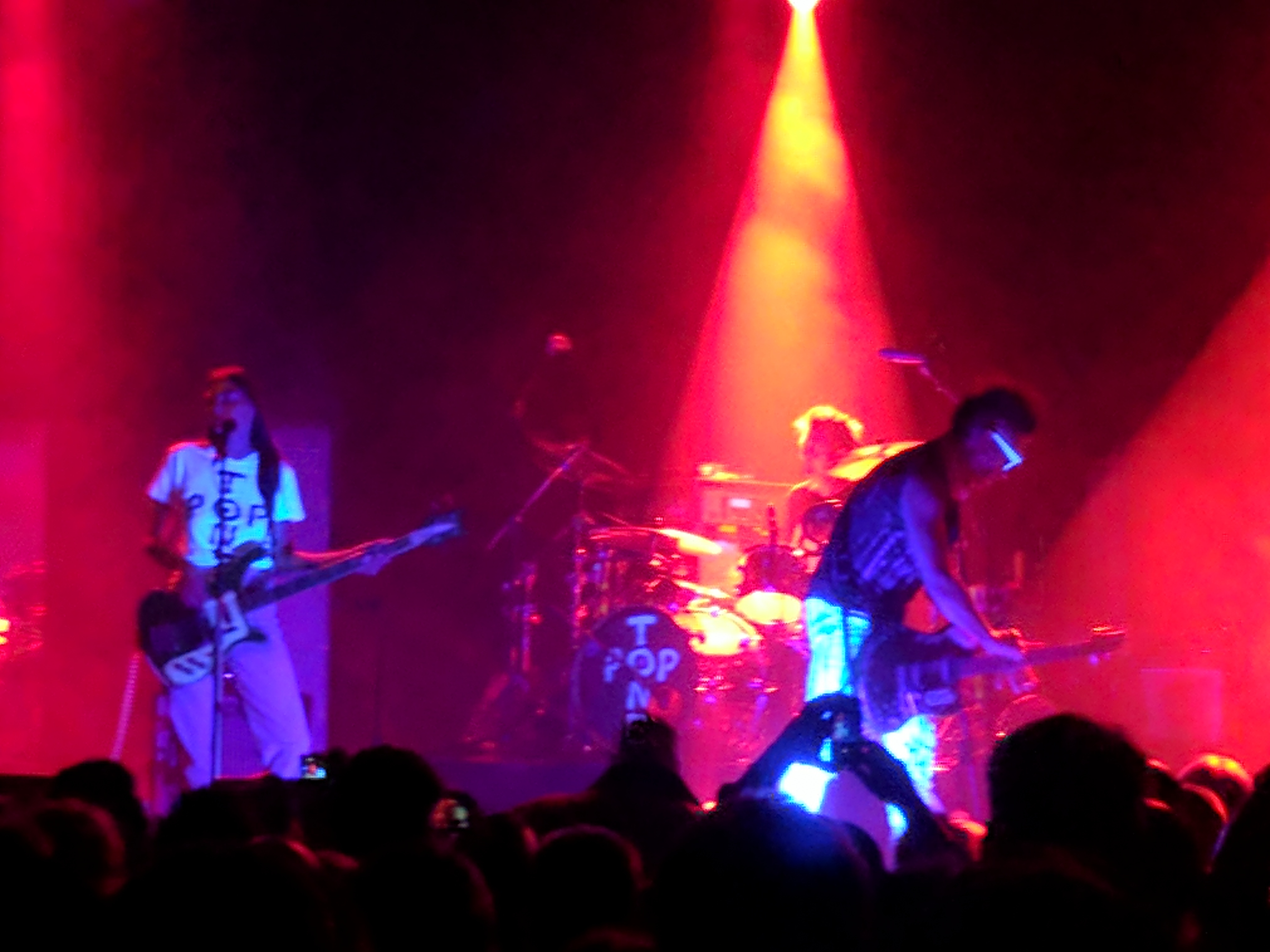
Poptone (Daniel Ash, Kevin Haskins, Diva Dompé) performing at the Regency Ballroom in San Francisco.

Riff Magazine critic Rachel Goodman reviewed a Poptone concert in San Francisco, saying "It was easy to forget just how many amazing songs Ash and Haskins have in their arsenal."

== Discography ==
=== Live albums ===
- Poptone (2017), self-released

=== Studio albums ===
- Poptone (2018), Cleopatra Records
