= New Tales to Tell: A Tribute to Love and Rockets =

Compilation album by Various artists
- Released: June 28, 2009
- Label: Arsenal Rock n Roll; Justice

New Tales to Tell: A Tribute to Love and Rockets is a tribute album to Love and Rockets, released on June 28, 2009 by record labels Arsenal Rock n Roll and Justice.

== Track listing ==
No.	Title	Artist	Length
1.	"All in My Mind"	Black Francis	5:00
2.	"Holiday on the Moon"	Puscifer	5:09
3.	"Love Me"	War Tapes	3:55
4.	"No New Tale to Tell"	Blaqk Audio	3:17
5.	"I Feel Speed (Rock Mix)"	Dubfire	3:37
6.	"Inside the Outside"	The Dandy Warhols	5:16
7.	"Kundalini Express"	The Flaming Lips	3:48
8.	"Life in Laralay"	Sweethead	3:33
9.	"An American Dream"	Film School	5:43
10.	"The Light"	A Place to Bury Strangers	3:16
11.	"Mirror People"	Monster Magnet vs Adrian Young	4:11
12.	"Fever"	The Stone Foxes	4:48
13.	"No Big Deal"	Frankenstein 3000	4:29
14.	"It Could Be Sunshine"	VEX	4:12
15.	"So Alive"	Better Than Ezra	3:27
16.	"Lazy"	Chantal Claret vs Adrian Young	4:08
17.	"Sweet F.A."	Lossy Coils with Ian Moore	4:32
18.	"No Words No More"	Snowden	4:09
