= Sweet F.A. (album) =

Studio album by Love and Rockets
- Released: 19 March 1996
- Genre: Alternative rock
- Length: 61:02
- Labels: American, Beggars Banquet
- Producers: Love and Rockets, John Fryer

Love and Rockets chronology
Hot Trip to Heaven (1994)	Sweet F.A. (1996)	Lift (1998)

Singles from Sweet F.A.
- 1. "Sweet Lover Hangover" Released: March 1996; 2. "Fever" Released: June 1996

Professional ratings
Review scores
Source	Rating
AllMusic	2/5 stars

Sweet F.A. is the sixth studio album by English alternative rock band Love and Rockets, released in 1996 by American Recordings and Beggars Banquet.

== Background ==
Sweet F.A. mostly exchanged Hot Trip to Heaven's electronic sound for a harder rock sound, showcasing more conventional songwriting. Despite the presence of loud guitars common to the airwaves in the late 1990s ("Sweet Lover Hangover" was a minor alternative radio hit), the album follows the structure of a classic head album, growing more experimental and disjointed as it progresses, culminating in the aggressive electronic dance of "Here Come the Comedown" and the chaotic "Spiked".

The title refers to the expression "sweet fuck all" or its minced oath version "sweet Fanny Adams", which is common British naval slang for "nothing". "Fuck all else" is prominently sung by Daniel Ash throughout the title track.

"Natacha" was written for singer Natacha Atlas, a friend of the band who appeared on Ash's first solo album.

In April 1995, during the recording of Sweet F.A., a fire broke out in the house owned by American Recordings, where the band were living and recording. All of the members were uninjured, but their visiting friend Genesis P. Orridge of Psychic TV was injured escaping the fire. The band lost their gear (a photo of a burnt guitar was used for the album cover) and months of work on the album.

== Track listing ==
All tracks are written by Love and Rockets (Daniel Ash, David J, Kevin Haskins).

No.	Title	Length
1.	"Sweet F.A."	4:07
2.	"Judgement Day"	4:21
3.	"Use Me"	4:10
4.	"Fever"	5:01
5.	"Sweet Lover Hangover"	5:11
6.	"Pearl"	4:12
7.	"Shelf Life"	3:23
8.	"Sad & Beautiful World"	5:57
9.	"Natacha"	4:53
10.	"Words of a Fool"	6:34
11.	"Clean"	5:38
12.	"Here Come the Comedown"	3:47
13.	"Spiked"	3:59
14.	"Sweet F.A. (Reprise)"	1:13

== Personnel ==
- Daniel Ash – guitar, saxophone, and vocals
- David J – bass and vocals
- Kevin Haskins – drums and synthesizers
