= Lift (Love and Rockets album) =

Studio album by Love and Rockets
- Released: 13 October 1998
- Genre: Electronica
- Length: 69:08
- Label: Red Ant
- Producers: Love and Rockets, Doug de Angelis

Love and Rockets chronology
Sweet F.A. (1996)	Lift (1998)	So Alive (2003)

Singles from Lift
- 1. "Resurrection Hex" Released: August 1998; 2. "Holy Fool" Released: October 1998; 3. "R.I.P. 20C" Released: December 1998

Professional ratings
Review scores
Source	Rating
Allmusic	3/5 stars

Lift is the seventh and final studio album by English alternative rock band Love and Rockets, released in 1998 on Red Ant Records.

== Background ==
Lift overlooked the harder rock of Sweet F.A. in favor of Hot Trip to Heaven's electronic sound. The album produced three singles: the club-oriented "Resurrection Hex", which features samples of Bauhaus' "Stigmata Martyr" and "In the Night"; the pop-oriented "Holy Fool", featuring background vocals by Luscious Jackson's Jill Cunniff; and the promo-only, acronym-laden electronica trip "R.I.P. 20 C."

The sound and title of "Resurrection Hex" instantly fed rumors of a much-anticipated Bauhaus reunion, which was officially announced almost immediately upon release of the record. The simultaneous bankruptcy of the Red Ant Records label — on which Peter Murphy was also an artist — and the subsequent success of the 1998–99 Bauhaus Resurrection tour led to the ultimate demise of Love and Rockets as a project.

== Track listing ==
All tracks are written by Love and Rockets (Daniel Ash, David J, Kevin Haskins).

No.	Title	Length
1.	"Lift (Malibu Mix)"	4:16
2.	"R.I.P. 20 C."	6:40
3.	"Holy Fool"	3:22
4.	"Too Much Choice"	4:50
5.	"Pink Flamingo"	3:53
6.	"Delicious Ocean"	4:06
7.	"Ghosts of the Multiple Feature"	4:42
8.	"Bad for You"	3:54
9.	"Resurrection Hex"	6:21
10.	"My Drug"	8:43
11.	"Deep Deep Down"	9:18
12.	"Party's Not Over"	5:10
13.	"Lift"	4:03

== Personnel ==
- Daniel Ash – guitar, saxophone, and vocals
- David J – bass and vocals
- Kevin Haskins – drums and synthesizers
