= Love and Rockets (album) =

Studio album by Love and Rockets
- Released: May 1989
- Recorded: album recorded 1988 at Blackwing Studios, South-East London, England except "The Purest Blue" at Far Heath Studios, Northampton, England radio sessions recorded 05th July 1989 on "SNAP with Deirdre O'Donoghue", on KCRW, Santa Monica College for NPR
- Genres: Alternative rock; neo-psychedelia
- Length: 41:44 (original); 127:20 (reissue)
- Labels: Beggars Banquet, Sonolux, Vertigo, Big Time, RCA
- Producers: John Fryer, Love and Rockets

Love and Rockets chronology
Earth, Sun, Moon (1987)	Love and Rockets (1989)	Hot Trip to Heaven (1994)

Singles from Love and Rockets
- 1. "Motorcycle" Released: February 1989; 2. "So Alive" Released: May 1989; 3. "Rock & Roll Babylon" Released: August 1989; 4. "No Big Deal" Released: November 1989

Professional ratings
Review scores
Source	Rating
AllMusic	3.5/5 stars

Love and Rockets is the fourth studio album by English alternative rock band Love and Rockets; it was released in 1989 by Beggars Banquet Records on cassette, vinyl, and compact disc.

== Background ==
Love and Rockets dismissed Earth, Sun, Moon's folk sound in favour of a stronger rock sound. Hints of the band's former psychedelic and gothic rock sound remain. Chief songwriters Daniel Ash and David J had begun concentrating strictly on their own material (rather than writing together) on Earth, Sun, Moon.

The album featured Love and Rockets' biggest hit, the Ash-penned "So Alive". The song was a surprising number 3 hit on the Billboard Hot 100, and stayed at number 1 for five weeks on the US Modern Rock chart. Because of the popularity of the single in the US, Love and Rockets became the band's best-selling album in America. It did very well in Canada as well, being certified platinum there in 1989, largely on the strength of "So Alive" which was a #1 single.

After the release of the album, the band embarked on a long worldwide tour. Afterward, instead of recording a new album and a follow-up single to "So Alive", J and Ash both focused on their solo careers, continuing in the directions represented on this album. They each released two solo albums after the break (with drummer Kevin Haskins working primarily with Ash) before returning as a band to record Hot Trip to Heaven in 1994.

In 2002, the album was remastered and expanded into a double album. The bonus tracks featured a single remix, three b-sides, all five songs from the aborted Swing! EP, and a radio session. The Swing! project was to be an outlet for some of the band's eccentric output, but the material was never released, except for "Bad Monkey", which ended up on the Glittering Darkness EP in 1996.

"The Purest Blue" is a radical reworking of "Waiting for the Flood" from Earth, Sun, Moon, and "**** (Jungle Law)" was later reworked as "Bad Monkey", recorded as part of the Swing! project.

== Track listing ==
All tracks are written by Love and Rockets.

No.	Title	Lyrics	Length
1.	"**** (Jungle Law)"	David J	4:32
2.	"No Big Deal"	Daniel Ash	4:56
3.	"The Purest Blue"	J	3:43
4.	"Motorcycle"	Ash	3:31
5.	"I Feel Speed"	Ash	3:24
6.	"Bound for Hell"	J, Traditional	6:01
7.	"The Teardrop Collector"	Ash	4:09
8.	"So Alive"	Ash	4:16
9.	"Rock and Roll Babylon"	J	3:22
10.	"No Words No More"	Ash, Gary Ash	3:50

2002 CD reissue bonus tracks
No.	Title	Lyrics	Length
11.	"Bike"		3:54
12.	"Bikedance"		7:07
13.	"No Big Deal (Remix)"		7:11
14.	"Dreamtime"	J	8:41

Swing! EP
No.	Title	Lyrics	Length
1.	"Wake Up!"	Ash	3:58
2.	"Cuckoo Land"	J	2:48
3.	"The Early Worm"	J	2:13
4.	"1000 Watts of Your Love"	Ash	2:48
5.	"Bad Monkey"	J	4:20

Live on SNAP with Deirdre O'Donoghue
No.	Title	Length
6.	"Introduction"	0:58
7.	"1000 Watts of Your Love"	3:08
8.	"No Words No More"	4:11
9.	"Interview"	34:19

== Personnel ==
=== Love and Rockets ===
- David J – vocals, bass guitar, harmonica, guitars, bass feedback, keyboards
- Daniel Ash – vocals, guitars, saxophone, bass guitar, fuzz bass, keyboards
- Kevin Haskins – drums, keyboards, samples, vibraphone, guitar feedback, percussion

=== Additional personnel ===
- "Mr. Drum Machine" – drum programming on "The Purest Blue"
- John Fryer – string synthesizer on "The Teardrop Collector"
- Lorna Wright, Sylvia Mason-James, Ruby James – backing vocals on "So Alive"
- Bill Thorp – string arrangement on "Rock & Roll Babylon" (Bill Thorp & Brian Brooks: violin; Josie Abbott: cello; Penny Thompson: viola)

== Production ==
- Produced by John Fryer and Love and Rockets
- Recorded and mixed by John Fryer at Blackwing Studios (London) except "The Purest Blue"; recorded and mixed by "Whispering Angus" at Far Heath Studios (Northamptonshire)
