= Karybdis (band) =

- Origin: London, England
- Genres: Melodic death metal
- Years active: 2009–present
- Members: Rich O'Donnell; Dave Klussmann; Jay Gladwin; Mitch McGugan
- Website: www.karybdis.com

Karybdis are an English heavy metal band from London, formed in 2009. Described by Metal Hammer as an "eclectic blend of melodic death metal, 21st-century metalcore and prog-tinged technicality", Karybdis have been bringing their live shows to audiences nationwide since 2009. They released their third studio album In the Shadow of Paradise independently on 2 November 2018.

== History ==
The band's name is shared with a sea monster from Greek mythology (spelt Charybdis) which was said to be a spawner of whirlpools who, together with Scylla, created a smashing gauntlet of death from which few seafarers escaped.

Their debut album From The Depths (produced by Russ Russell) embraced a Gothenburg-tinged sound, twinned by an unfaltering hardcore groove that elevated them to the upper echelons of the UK underground. Following a storming performance at UK Tech Fest 2013 the band began work on their sophomore release.

Produced by Mark Lewis at Audio Hammer Studios, Samsara saw the addition of guitarist Matthew Lowry. The band were invited to play Bloodstock in 2016.

Their next album, In The Shadow Of Paradise, was released on 2 November 2018. It was produced by Pavel Daniels of CoreTone Studios.

Following the amicable departure of founding member and guitarist, Pierre Dujardin, Karybdis began searching for a new guitarist to complete their lineup. After opening up auditions, they were contacted by long time fan Pete Rogers, who impressed the band with his both his technical ability and his attitude towards the music. The new line-up played a packed out album launch show at the Unicorn Camden on 21 November 2018.

The band released an EP in 2021, titled Order & Chaos.

== Members ==
- Rich O'Donnell – vocals (2009 – Present)
- Jay Gladwin – bass (2009 – Present)
- Mitch McGugan – drums (2009 – Present)
- Dave Klussmann - Guitar (2020 - Present)
- Matt Lowry - guitar (2015–2020)
- Pete Rogers - guitar (2018–2021)
- Pierre Dujardin – guitar (2009–2018)
- Harsha Dasari – guitar (2009–2015)

== Discography ==
- From the Depths (Beasting Records, 2012)
- Samsara (Beasting Records, 2016)
- In The Shadow of Paradise (2018)
