= The Stone Foxes =

American rock band

- Origin: San Francisco, California, U.S.
- Genres: Blues rock, hard rock, soul, rock and roll
- Years active: 2005–present
- Labels: Buff Records, Kaleidoscopic Wondersound Records
- Members: Shannon Koehler; Spence Koehler
- Past members: Aaron Mort; Avi Vinocur; Vince Dewald; Ben Andrews; Brian Bakalian; Elliott Peltzman
- Website: Thestonefoxes.com

The Stone Foxes is an American rock and roll band based in San Francisco, California, United States.

== History ==
The Stone Foxes originated in the foothills of California's Central Valley where founding members Aaron Mort and brothers Spence Koehler (guitar) and Shannon Koehler (drums, vocals) grew up. After high school, they went to college at San Francisco State University. A couple of years later, after living with the three founding members and discovering their similar musical tastes, Avi Vinocur (guitar, bass) joined the band.

Formed in late 2005, The Stone Foxes spent their first few years together working on balancing out their musical style. The end product is a style infused with country, rock, blues, and a touch of San Francisco. The group's songs are characterized by classic blues structures and shout-along moments.

In April 2011, keyboardist Elliott Peltzman joined the band. Later that year, they opened for Cage The Elephant and Grammy winners The Black Keys at Mesa Amphitheatre in Phoenix, Arizona. Their cover of Slim Harpo's "I'm A King Bee" was featured in the national ad campaign for Jack Daniel's Tennessee Honey.

In 2013, following the departures of Aaron Mort and Avi Vinocur, the band underwent a major change in personnel marked by the additions of multi-instrumentalist Brian Bakalian, singer/guitarist/bassist Vince Dewald, and guitarist/violinist Ben Andrews. The new lineup released the album Small Fires that same year, featuring the singles "Everybody Knows," Ulysses Jones," and "Cotto."

On their fourth album, The Stone Foxes took a different approach to releasing their new music, launching Foxes First Friday. Beginning with "Locomotion" on September 5, 2014, the band detailed plans to release a new song for free on the first Friday of every month. Coupled with live versions, bonus tracks, and photos from the road, each song was compiled into an album titled Twelve Spells, which was released in August 2015. That same year, the band was covered in Forbes for their DIY success that came without the help of a record label.

In February 2016 The Stone Foxes embarked on their first UK tour with Bath-based, Zambian brother duo Bite The Buffalo. Most dates on the tour sold out.

In 2017, the band released the Visalia EP, a collection of songs they created while camping in the town of the same name. Singles included "Fight," "Shake Like Buddy Holly," and the autobiographical "If I Die Tonight," about lead singer/drummer Shannon Koehler's lifelong struggle with a congenital heart condition.

On September 18, 2018, the band announced members Elliott Peltzman, Brian Bakalian, and Vince Dewald would be leaving the band. The band continued with a new lineup of Shannon and Spence Koehler. That year, The Stone Foxes released two singles, "City on the Water" and "Gimme Some Truth". The following year in 2019, they released another single, entitled "Death of Me".

During 2020 the band released two more singles, "Can't Go Back" and "Patriots", as well as an EP entitled Gold. Gold, released on February 28, 2020, features five tracks that center on themes of deception, greed, and loss. The band's latest release is a single entitled "Electric Stomp", released in 2021.

The Stone Foxes' music has been featured in numerous television, movie, advertisement, and radio slots. Some accolades include the feature of their track "Hyde and Pine" in the 2018 Oscar-winning film Free Solo, their song "Young Man" being included on season one, episode twelve of Fox's Deputy, and multiple songs being featured on a variety of episodes of FX's Sons of Anarchy.

The band has also played at many well-known festivals and supported noteworthy artists. Credits include playing at Outside Lands, VooDoo Music Experience, and SXSW, and performing with artists such as The Black Keys, Cage the Elephant, and ZZ Top.

== Philanthropy ==
The Stone Foxes founded the Goodnight Moon Project to combat homelessness. The band has also partnered with SuperFood Drive to collect and donate healthy food at their shows to those locally in need.

== Members ==
Current members of the band are

- Shannon Koehler // Vocals, Harmonica, Drums
- Spence Koehler // Guitar, Vocals

=== Past members ===
- Aaron Mort // Vocals, Guitar, Bass
- Avi Vinocur // Vocals, Guitar
- Vince Dewald // Vocals, Bass, Guitar
- Ben Andrews // Guitar, Violin, Vocals
- Brian Bakalian // Drums, Bass, Guitar, Vocals
- Elliott Peltzman // Keys, Vocals, Bass, Drums

== Appearances in media ==
=== TV ===
- Shameless (Showtime)
- Sons of Anarchy (FX)
- Ray Donovan (Sky)
- Elementary (CBS)
- NFL on Fox (Fox)
- NASCAR (Fox)
- Bar Rescue (Spike)
- Body Language (Showtime)
- Legit (FXX)
- The Returned (A&E)
- White Collar Brawlers (Esquire)
- Deputy (Fox)
- Reacher (Prime Video)
- Dexter: Resurrection (Paramount+ with Showtime)

=== Film ===
- 12 Men of Christmas
- Conception
- Abel's Field
- Free Solo

=== Advertisements ===
The band has appeared in advertisements:

- Jack Daniel's
- BMW
- Quiksilver Snow
- Ariat Boots
- RIDGID TOOLS
- JanSport
- Clif Bar, GreenNotes partnership
- Budweiser

=== Video games ===
- Tap Tap Revenge

=== Radio ===
The band was featured on NPR's "World Cafe: Next" in July 2010. "Mr. Hangman" off Bears & Bulls was in Power Rotation on X103.9 Phoenix, and Bears & Bulls peaked at No. 4 on FMQB's Sub Modern albums chart, with single "Stomp" coming in at No. 7.

== Discography ==
Source: Spotify

=== Albums and EPs ===
- Black Rolling Thunder (2006)
- The Stone Foxes (2008)
- Bears & Bulls (2010)
- Small Fires (2013)
- Twelve Spells (2015)
- Live from the Loin (2016)
- Visalia EP (2017)
- Gold EP (2020)
- On the Other Side (2022)

=== Compilation albums ===
- New Tales to Tell: A Tribute to Love and Rockets (Justice Records) (2009): "Fever"

=== Singles ===
- "Stomp" (2010)
- "Mr. Hangman" (2010)
- "Psycho" (2011)
- "Everybody Knows" (2012)
- "Eye for Love" (2015)
- "Fight" (2017)
- "Shake Like Buddy Holly" (2017)
- "City on the Water" (2018)
- "Gimme Some Truth" (2018)
- "Death of Me" (2019)
- "Can't Go Back" (2020)
- "Patriots" (two-song single, 2020)
- "Electric Stomp" (2021)

=== Cover versions ===
- "Rollin and Tumblin", Muddy Waters
- "I'm a King Bee", Slim Harpo
- "Little Red Rooster", Willie Dixon
- "Spoonful", Willie Dixon
- "Gimme Some Truth", John Lennon
- "Fever", Love and Rockets
