= Burning Skies =

EP by Tones on Tail
- Released: 6 May 1983
- Genre: Gothic rock, post-punk
- Label: Situation Two
- Producer: Tones on Tail

Tones on Tail chronology
Tones on Tail (1982)	Burning Skies (1983)	Pop (1984)

Burning Skies is an EP by English post-punk band Tones on Tail. It was released on 6 May 1983 on record label Situation Two.

== Track listing ==
All tracks are written by Daniel Ash and Glenn Campling, except "OK, This Is the Pops", written by Ash, Campling and Kevin Haskins

Side A
No.	Title	Length
1.	"Burning Skies"	6:27
2.	"OK, This Is the Pops"	3:04

Side B
No.	Title	Length
1.	"When You're Smiling"	5:48
2.	"You, the Night and the Music"	5:01

== Critical reception ==
Professional ratings
Review scores
Source	Rating
AllMusic	3/5 stars

Trouser Press commented that the EP "offers very little songwriting content, merely scanty ideas in service of largely pointless studio fiddling".

== Personnel ==
Tones on Tail

- Daniel Ash – production
- Glenn Campling – production
- Kevin Haskins – production

Technical

- Derek Tomkins – engineering
