= Seventh Dream of Teenage Heaven =

Studio album by Love and Rockets
- Released: 11 October 1985
- Recorded: Woodbine Studios, Leamington Spa, Warwickshire, England
- Genre: Psychedelia; post-punk
- Length: 42:30
- Label: Beggars Banquet
- Producer: John A. Rivers, Love and Rockets

Love and Rockets chronology
Seventh Dream of Teenage Heaven (1985)	Express (1986)

Singles from Seventh Dream of Teenage Heaven
- 1. "If There's a Heaven Above" Released: 13 September 1985

Seventh Dream of Teenage Heaven is the debut studio album by English rock band Love and Rockets. It was released on 11 October 1985, through record label Beggars Banquet. Seventh Dream was preceded by the non-album single "Ball of Confusion" on 17 May 1985, and the album's first proper single "If There's a Heaven Above" on 13 September 1985.

The album was remastered in October 1999 and reissued in the year 2000 with six bonus tracks (both sides of the non-album single Ball of Confusion, three remixes of If There's a Heaven Above and one remix of Haunted When the Minutes Drag) and new album cover artwork.

== Reception ==
Professional ratings
Review scores
Source	Rating
AllMusic	4/5 stars

AllMusic wrote, "Though the years have deadened its impact somewhat, there is still a visceral thrill to be drawn from replaying the first Love and Rockets album, a sense of the first step taken towards a brave new world", calling the album "as profound an experience as any of the lauded trips of the original psychedelic era."

== Track listing ==
All tracks are written by Love and Rockets (Daniel Ash, David J, Kevin Haskins), except where noted.

Side A
No.	Title	Lyrics	Length
1.	"If There's a Heaven Above"	Ash, J	4:57
2.	"A Private Future"	Ash	5:06
3.	"The Dog-End of a Day Gone By"	J	7:38
4.	"The Game"	Ash	5:09

Side B
No.	Title	Lyrics	Length
5.	"Seventh Dream of Teenage Heaven"	Ash, J	6:37
6.	"Haunted When the Minutes Drag"	Ash, J	8:03
7.	"Saudade"		5:00

2000 CD reissue bonus tracks
No.	Title	Writer(s)	Length
8.	"Ball of Confusion" (UK 12" Mix)	Norman Whitfield, Barrett Strong	7:20
9.	"Inside the Outside"		4:22
10.	"If There's a Heaven Above" (UK 12" Mix)		7:00
11.	"God and Mr. Smith"		4:49
12.	"Haunted When the Minutes Drag" (USA Mix)		4:32
13.	"If There's a Heaven Above" (Canada Mix)		4:26

== Personnel ==
Love and Rockets

- Daniel Ash – vocals, guitar, keyboards, production, sleeve design
- David J – vocals, bass guitar, keyboards, electric guitar on "Saudade", production, sleeve design
- Kevin Haskins – drums and keyboards, production, sleeve design

Additional personnel

- John A. Rivers – keyboards, string arrangement on "Saudade", engineering, production

Technical

- Mitch Jenkins – back cover photography
