= Foolish Thing Desire =

Studio album by Daniel Ash
- Released: 1992
- Studio: Woodbine
- Genres: Gothic rock, alternative rock
- Length: 54:19
- Label: Beggars Banquet Records/PolyGram/Columbia Records
- Producers: John A. Rivers, Daniel Ash

Daniel Ash chronology
Coming Down (1991)	Foolish Thing Desire (1992)	Daniel Ash (2002)

Foolish Thing Desire is the second solo album by the English musician Daniel Ash. It was released in 1992. It was a success on Billboard's Alternative Albums chart. Ash supported the album with a North American tour.

== Critical reception ==
Professional ratings
Review scores
Source	Rating
AllMusic	4.5/5 stars
Calgary Herald	D
Los Angeles Times	2/4 stars
The Philadelphia Inquirer	1/4 stars

The Calgary Herald deemed the album "boring as hell." Newsday wrote that "songs such as 'Here She Comes Again' and 'The Hedonist' spotlight Ash's no-holds-barred guitar style." The Philadelphia Inquirer concluded that "'Bluebird', perhaps the only song of interest on this 10-cut disc, finds Ash masquerading as a goth Kenny Loggins."

== Track listing ==
- All songs written by Daniel Ash, except 4, 8 and 9 (Ash, John A. Rivers)
1. Here She Comes 4:51
2. Foolish Thing Desire 5:27
3. Bluebird 5:11
4. Dream Machine 6:54
5. Get Out of Control 4:25
6. The Void 5:39
7. Roll On 5:30
8. Here She Comes Again 5:51
9. The Hedonist 6:44
10. Higher Than This 3:47
11. Paris '92 (exclusive to Japanese Version)
12. Acid Rain (exclusive to Japanese Version)
13. Firedance (exclusive to Japanese Version)

== Personnel ==
- Daniel Ash: Vocals, Guitars, Keyboards, Bass
- John A. Rivers: Keyboards and Drum Programming, Bass on "Here She Comes" and "Dream Machine"
- Sylvan Richardson: Bass on "Here She Comes"
- Natacha Atlas: Backing Vocals on "Bluebird"
- She Rocola: Backing Vocals on "Here She Comes"
