= The Product =

American alternative rock band

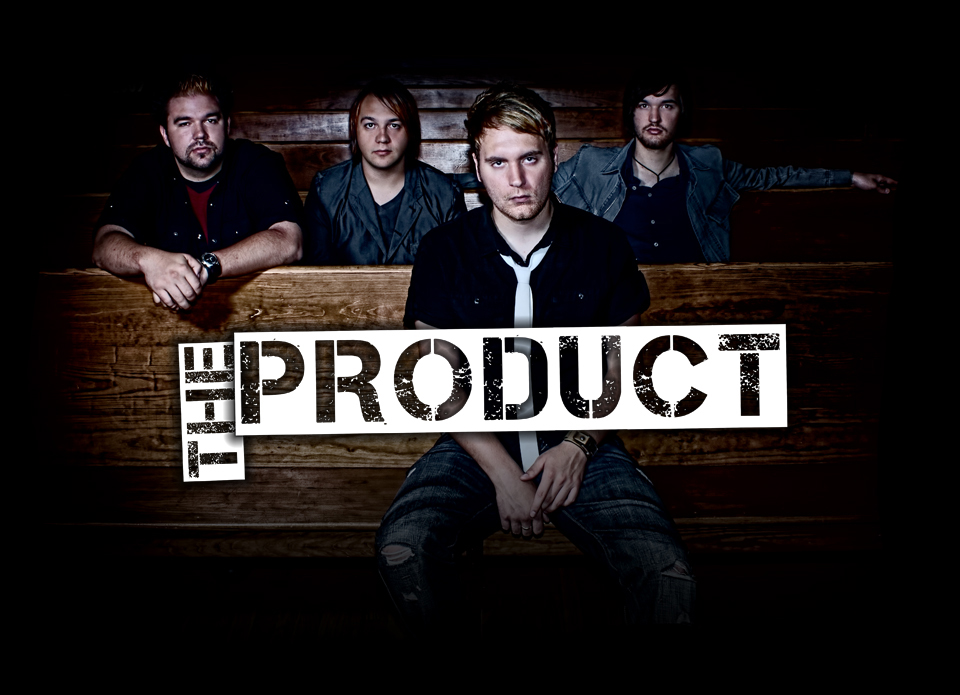

Background information
- Origin: Goodells, Michigan
- Genres: Alternative rock
- Members: B.J. Perry; R.J. Perry; Rich Bennett; Charlie Jewell
- Past members: Jerome Reilly

The Product is an alternative rock band based out of Goodells, Michigan. The Product formed in early 2009 with the original line-up of B.J. Perry, R.J. Perry, Rich Bennett and Jerome Reilly. Several months later the band parted ways with Jerome, and picked up former bandmate and high school friend Charlie Jewell. They have released two E.P.'s titled "Break The Silence" and more recently "So Alive."

== History ==
=== Break the Silence (2009) ===
Their debut EP, Break the Silence, was self-released in 2009 and generated an instant buzz throughout the Midwest. The track "Nightmare" stayed at Number 1 on Alternative Addiction's top ten Unsigned Bands list for several months. The band went on to tour the Midwest extensively and sold over 4,000 copies of BTS. Also, the track from the E.P. "Better Off This Way" had a clip appear in the hit MTV show Jersey Shore

=== One (Early 2010) ===
In 2010, the band covered the song "One" by Harry Nilsson, which was more famously covered by Three Dog Night.

=== Make Your Move (Late 2010 – early 2011) ===
Make Your Move was the theme song for Total Nonstop Action's Final Resolution (2010). The song is also being used by the Detroit Red Wings organization being played at home games at the Joe Louis Arena as well being featured in a hits collage on their website. The song is expected to be re-released on The Product's follow up release "So Alive" expected in 2011. The Product was also named the number one unsigned band of the year by voters on Alternative Addiction, as well as featured on the music discovery site Daily Unsigned.

=== So Alive (2012 – present) ===
The Product released their follow up E.P. "So Alive" in June 2012, it was product by Brian Virtue (30 Seconds To Mars, Puddle Of Mudd, Chevelle). Out of Control was the theme song for Total Nonstop Action's Final Resolution (2012).

== Tour ==
The Product has toured throughout the Midwest gaining a loyal following in those states. They won the Ernie Ball Warped Tour Battle of the Bands and played the Detroit date at Comerica Park, as well as opening up for nationals like Cavo, Mayday Parade, and Pop Evil, and Danko Jones at the sold out WWBN Banana Binge Before Christmas Show in 2010.

== Band members ==
- B.J. Perry - lead vocals/rhythm guitar
- R.J. Perry - drums
- Rich Bennett - bass/vocals
- Charlie Jewell - lead guitar/vocals
