= From the Depths =

From The Depths

Studio album by Karybdis
- Released: 21 November 2012
- Recorded: 2011, Parlour Studios, England
- Genre: Melodic death metal
- Length: 47:53
- Label: Beasting Records
- Producer: Russ Russell

Professional ratings
Review scores
Source	Rating
Hit The Floor	10/10 stars
One Metal	4.5/5 stars
Rock n Reel	4/5 stars
Lyric Lounge	9/10 stars

From The Depths is the debut full-length album from British progressive death metal band Karybdis. It was recorded in 2011 at Parlour Studios and mixed and mastered by Russ Russell. It was released in July 2012 digitally and in physical format on 21 November 2012.

== Track listing ==
All tracks are written by Karybdis

No.	Title	Length
1.	"Minotaur"	4:59
2.	"From The Depths"	4:11
3.	"Without Wings"	3:45
4.	"Arson Aesthetics"	5:11
5.	"Worth It"	5:35
6.	"I Say"	3:50
7.	"Medusa"	4:08
8.	"Maelstrom"	6:08
9.	"The Hourglass"	2:58
10.	"Deathtoll"	7:06

== Personnel ==
- Rich O'Donnell – vocals
- Pierre Dujardin – guitar
- Harsha Dasari – guitar
- Jay Gladwin – bass
- Mitch McGugan – drums
