= Tones on Tail =

British post-punk band

Background information
- Origin: Northampton, England
- Genres: Post-punk; gothic rock
- Years active: 1982–1984, 2024
- Labels: 4AD, Situation 2, Beggars Banquet
- Members: Daniel Ash; Glenn Campling; Kevin Haskins

Tones on Tail were a British post-punk band formed in 1982, originally as a musical side project of Daniel Ash of the gothic rock group Bauhaus. Their music was described by one critic as "doom-and-dance-pop."

== History ==
While still a member of Bauhaus, Ash formed Tones on Tail early in 1982, originally as a duo with Glenn Campling, an art school friend and flatmate who had also been a roadie for Bauhaus. The band's name was a reference to the way calibration tones were recorded on the "tail" of reel-to-reel tape.

The pair issued their debut eponymous EP on 4AD in March 1982, followed by the single "There's Only One!", released by Beggars Banquet Records on 24 September. Ash sang and played guitar, Campling played bass, and both played percussion and keyboards. After the break-up of Bauhaus in 1983, Ash and Campling were joined by Bauhaus's drummer Kevin Haskins and the band became a full-time concern for all three members. Their first release as a trio was the Burning Skies EP, issued by Situation Two on 6 May 1983.

Their sole studio album, Pop, was released by Beggars Banquet on 6 April 1984 in the UK, featuring the singles "Performance" (released 9 March) and "Lions" (released 11 May). The album was also issued in North America in altered form as The Album Pop. "Go!", the popular B-side of "Lions", was issued on its own as a single in Canada, licensed by Vertigo Records. Throughout October of that year, the group embarked on a short 12-date tour of the US; in concert, the band sported all white outfits. The final Tones on Tail single, "Christian Says", was issued on 9 November. They disbanded later that year, and Ash and Haskins quickly formed Love and Rockets with former Bauhaus bassist David J.

The 1998 compilation Everything! compiled every Tones on Tail track in remastered form, plus a radio interview with Ash and Haskins.

In 2017, Ash and Haskins, along with Haskins' daughter Diva Dompé on bass, formed the band Poptone, performing songs by Bauhaus, Love and Rockets and Tones on Tail in concert. On 11 May 2024, Tones on Tail performed their first official set since 1984 at the Cruel World Festival, with Dompé filling in for Campling.

== Reception ==
Richard Williams of The Michigan Daily said, "Tones on Tail carries on with the traditional Bauhaus taste for the macabre, but charts new courses of twisting the pop thing." James Muretich of The Calgary Herald wrote, "From the ashes of Bauhaus has arisen a British trio that is turning into one of the most impressive and macabre dance bands around." Writing retrospectively for AllMusic, critic Ned Raggett said, "With their former band's generally gloomier shadows left behind, what Ash and Haskins draw from their time with Bauhaus is that group's melange of styles—their most underappreciated strength".

== Discography ==
Studio albums

- Pop (1984, Beggars Banquet)

EPs

- Tones on Tail (1982, 4AD)
- Burning Skies (1983, Situation Two)
- Something! (1998, Beggars Banquet)

Singles

- "There's Only One!" (1982, Beggars Banquet)
- "Burning Skies" (1983, Situation 2) No. 11 UK Indie
- "Performance" (1984, Beggars Banquet)
- "Lions" (1984, Beggars Banquet)
- "Go!" (1984, Vertigo)
- "Christian Says" (1984, Beggars Banquet)

Compilation albums

- Tones on Tail (1985, Situation Two)
- Night Music (1987, Beggars Banquet)
- Tones on Tail (1990, RCA/Beggars Banquet)
- Everything! (1998, Beggars Banquet)
- Weird Pop (2011, Beggars Banquet)
