= So Alive (Love and Rockets song) =

1989 single by Love and Rockets

Single by Love and Rockets

from the album Love and Rockets
- B-side: "Dreamtime"; "Motorcycle"; "Bike"
- Released: 1989
- Genre: Alternative rock; glam rock; funk; dance-pop; gothic pop
- Length: 4:15
- Label: Beggars Banquet; RCA
- Songwriters: Daniel Ash; David Haskins; Kevin Haskins
- Producers: Love and Rockets; John Fryer

Love and Rockets singles chronology
"Motorcycle" (1989)	"So Alive" (1989)	"Rock & Roll Babylon" (1989)

Music video
- "So Alive" on YouTube

"So Alive" is a song by British alternative rock band Love and Rockets, released in 1989 as the second single from their self-titled fourth album. The song reached No. 1 in Canada and charted within the top 30 in the United States, Australia, and New Zealand. In the US, it topped the Billboard Modern Rock Tracks chart for five weeks and was ranked No. 1 on that listing's year-end chart for 1989. The song's music video was directed by Howard Greenhalgh and produced by Pamela James.

== Background ==
At a party one Saturday night, singer Daniel Ash saw a beautiful woman with long brown hair on the other side of a dark, shadowy room. He didn't go talk to her because he was married, but he was infatuated for the rest of the weekend. "It was like I'd known her in a different lifetime or something. It was just this thing that hit me like a ton of bricks. I couldn't stop thinking about her," he said.

On Monday, he took a bottle of whiskey into the basement of Blackwing Studios in London, and put together chords and lyrics about the woman in 45 minutes. His bandmates provided bass and drums. Inspired by "Walk on the Wild Side" by Lou Reed, the band brought in female backing singers the next day, and finished the song in under 24 hours.

== Critical reception ==
Billboard magazine described "So Alive" as "delectable" as well as the "best T. Rex tune that Marc Bolan never wrote." Ned Raggett of AllMusic wrote that the song was the only track on the album capable of receiving airplay and also noted the T. Rex similarities.

== Chart performance ==
The single was Love and Rockets' biggest hit in the United States, peaking at No. 3 on the Billboard Hot 100 and No. 1 on the Billboard Modern Rock Tracks chart, where it stayed for five weeks, as well as achieving a peak of No. 9 on the Billboard Album Rock Tracks chart. It was the most successful modern rock song of 1989 in the United States, ranking in at No. 1 on the chart's year-end edition. The song peaked at No. 1 on Canada's RPM 100 Singles chart for two weeks, finishing 1989 as Canada's sixth-best-performing single. "So Alive" also reached No. 79 on the UK Singles Chart, No. 24 on the Australian Singles Chart, and No. 16 on the New Zealand Singles Chart.

== Track listings ==
- UK, US, and Canadian 7-inch single

UK and Canadian 12-inch single
UK and US cassette single
A. "So Alive" – 4:18 (4:15 in North America)
B. "Dreamtime" – 8:42 (8:40 in North America)

- UK CD single
1. "So Alive" – 3:48
2. "Dreamtime" – 8:42
3. "Motorcycle" – 3:32
4. "Bike" – 3:46
- European and Australasian 7-inch single

A. "So Alive" – 4:15
B. "Bike" – 3:56 (3:46 in Australasia)

- European and Australian 12-inch single

A1. "So Alive" – 4:15
B1. "Bike" – 3:56 (3:46 in Australia)
B2. "Dreamtime" – 8:40

== Charts ==
=== Weekly charts ===
Chart (1989–1990)	Peak position
Australia (ARIA)	24
Canada Top Singles (RPM)	1
New Zealand (Recorded Music NZ)	16
UK Singles (Official Charts)	79
US Billboard Hot 100	3
US Album Rock Tracks (Billboard)	9
US Dance Club Play (Billboard) with "Bike Dance"	20
US Modern Rock Tracks (Billboard)	1

=== Year-end charts ===
Chart (1989)	Position
Canada Top Singles (RPM)	6
US Billboard Hot 100	51
US Album Rock Tracks (Billboard)	44
US Modern Rock Tracks (Billboard)	1

== See also ==
- List of Billboard Modern Rock Tracks number ones of the 1980s
