= Love and Rockets (band) =

English rock band

- Origin: Northampton, England
- Genres: Alternative rock; post-punk
- Works: Discography
- Years active: 1985–1999, 2007–2009, 2023, 2024
- Labels: Beggars Banquet, RCA, American, Red Ant
- Spinoffs: The Bubblemen; Poptone
- Spinoff of: Bauhaus; Tones on Tail
- Members: Daniel Ash; Kevin Haskins; David J

Love and Rockets are an English rock band formed in 1985 by former Bauhaus members Daniel Ash (vocals, guitar and saxophone), David J (bass guitar and vocals) and Kevin Haskins (drums and synthesisers) after that group split in 1983. Ash and Haskins had recorded and performed in another band, Tones on Tail, between 1982 and 1984.

Love and Rockets's style is a fusion of underground rock music with elements of pop music. Their 1989 single "So Alive" reached No. 3 on the Billboard Hot 100 chart. They released seven studio albums before breaking up in 1999, and reformed briefly in 2007 for a few live shows before splitting again in 2009. They reformed in 2023 and announced several tour dates.

== History ==
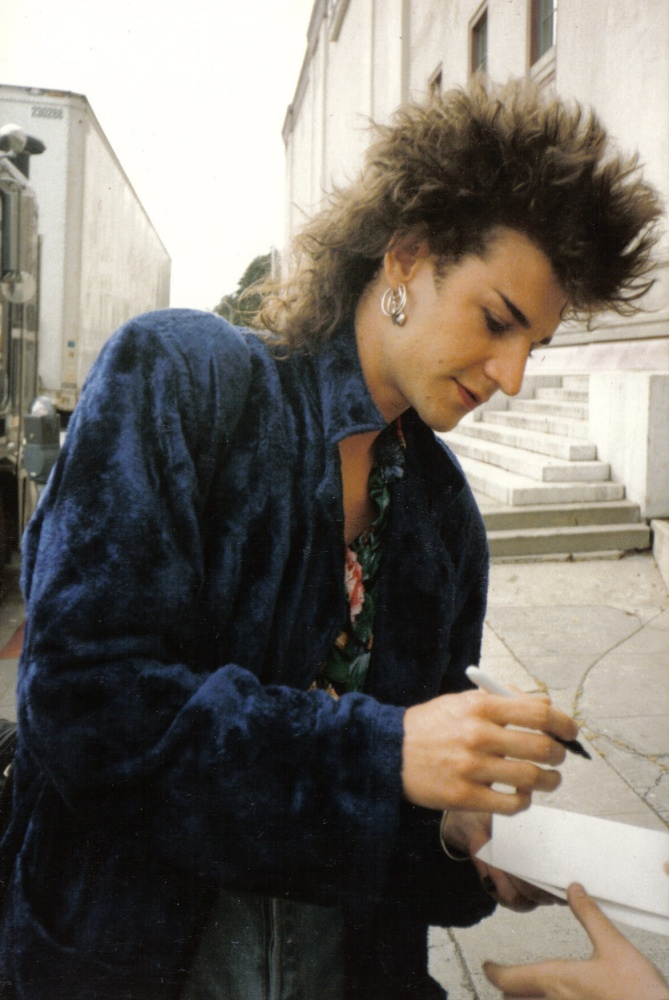
Daniel Ash in 1986, while with the band in Oakland, California, outside of the Kaiser Convention Center

The band's name was taken from the comic book series Love and Rockets by the Hernandez brothers. Gilbert Hernandez later referred to the confusion caused by this in his book Love and Rockets X, as there were several different bands named "Love and Rockets" for a period.

Despite their previous band's status as a gothic rock act, Love and Rockets moved towards a slightly brighter and more pop-influenced sound, as demonstrated by their first minor hit, a cover of the Motown classic "Ball of Confusion" (reached #18 on the Canadian charts in January 1986). Their first studio album was 1985's Seventh Dream of Teenage Heaven (1985). Their second album, 1986's Express, continued in the same vein, adding even more of a pop feel to the mix. It included the dance hit "Yin and Yang (The Flowerpot Man)". The 1987 follow-up, Earth, Sun, Moon, had a more acoustic sound and spawned the minor hit "No New Tale to Tell". The following year, they released the single "The Bubblemen Are Coming" under the alias The Bubblemen. A music video was also produced. It was issued by Beggars Banquet Records in several format variations, including additional tracks "Bubblemen Rap", "Bubblemen Rap (Dub Version)" and "Bees". A brief excerpt of "The Bubblemen are Coming!" appeared in the Love and Rockets videos "No New Tale to Tell" and "Yin and Yang (The Flowerpot Man)".

In 1989, the band released their self-titled album, which presented a more AOR sound. The second single from the album was the T. Rex-inspired song "So Alive", which became a hit and reached No. 3 on the Billboard Hot 100, a feat no Bauhaus-related band or artist has achieved before or since.

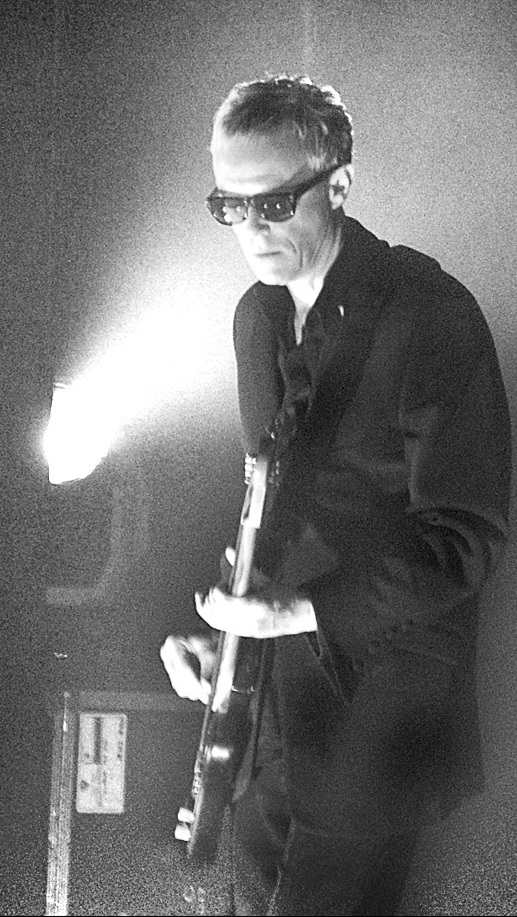
Co-founder David J on bass, pictured in 2006

After a gruelling tour schedule in support of their big hit, Love and Rockets took a few years off before returning to the studio. The result was a move to an electronic sound that had more in common with the Orb than their rock or goth roots. Their label, RCA Records, dropped them. They signed with Rick Rubin's American Recordings to release Hot Trip to Heaven in 1994, followed in 1996 by Sweet F.A.. In April 1995, during the recording of Sweet F.A., a fire broke out in the house owned by American Recordings, where the band were living and recording. None of the members were injured, but their visiting friend Genesis P. Orridge of Psychic TV was injured whilst escaping the fire. The band lost their gear (a photo of a burnt guitar was used for the album cover of Sweet F.A.) and months of work on the album. There was a lengthy legal battle between the band, their label, and the label's insurance company. Love and Rockets were found not responsible for the fire, but were left with a large legal bill. Lift came out in 1998 on Red Ant Records, and, after performing in Toronto in April, 1999, Love and Rockets disbanded.

Love and Rockets announced in October 2007 on their MySpace page that they would reform to play one song at "Cast a Long Shadow", a tribute to Joe Strummer and benefit for Strummerville, the Joe Strummer Foundation for New Music, on 22 December 2007 at the Key Club in West Hollywood, California. They covered the Clash's "Should I Stay or Should I Go", playing the song twice, the second time inviting members of the audience to join them onstage to sing along. They performed on 27 April 2008 at the Coachella Valley Music and Arts Festival, and at Lollapalooza on 3 August 2008 in Chicago.

In an interview in June 2009, Ash emphatically stated he had no further plans to play with Love and Rockets. "We've worked together since 1980. I really want to work with new people, I'm sure everybody feels the same."

A tribute album titled New Tales to Tell: A Tribute to Love and Rockets was released on 18 August 2009, featuring contributions from the Flaming Lips, Frank Black, Puscifer, A Place to Bury Strangers, Film School, Better Than Ezra, Johnny Dowd, the Dandy Warhols, Blaqk Audio, the Stone Foxes and Monster Magnet.

On 23 January 2023, Love and Rockets announced a reunion for an appearance at the Cruel World Festival in Pasadena, California on 20 May 2023, the band's first concert in 15 years. They later announced a 2023 U.S. tour in support of their appearance at Cruel World. A Bauhaus reunion was aborted in 2022 after Peter Murphy forced the band to cancel the tour as he entered rehab. Ash said the 2023 tour would be the band's last.

In May 2024, it was announced Love and Rockets would be touring with Jane's Addiction, but the tour was cancelled part way through after Perry Farrell had an altercation with Dave Navarro on stage during a show in Boston.

== Discography ==
Studio albums

- Seventh Dream of Teenage Heaven (1985)
- Express (1986)
- Earth, Sun, Moon (1987)
- Love and Rockets (1989)
- Hot Trip to Heaven (1994)
- Sweet F.A. (1996)
- Lift (1998)
