= Kevin Haskins =

English drummer (born 1960)

- Also known as: Kevin Michael Dompe
- Born: Kevin Michael Haskins; 19 July 1960 (age 66); Northampton, Northamptonshire, England
- Genres: Gothic rock; post-punk; alternative rock; electronic; psychedelic rock
- Occupations: Musician; drummer; songwriter; composer
- Instruments: Drums; synthesizer; keyboards; percussion
- Years active: 1978–present
- Labels: Beggars Banquet; RCA; 4AD
- Member of: Poptone
- Formerly of: Bauhaus, Love and Rockets, Tones on Tail, The Bubblemen

Kevin Michael Dompe (born 19 July 1960), born and best known as Kevin Michael Haskins, is an English drummer, best known from the British rock group Bauhaus. He was also a member of Tones on Tail and Love and Rockets.

== Early career ==
As a child, Haskins banged on flowerpots and kitchen pots and pans. He eventually moved to bongos and then to drums. It wasn't until Haskins attended a Sex Pistols gig that he and his brother David J formed a band called the Submerged Tenth. The band was short-lived, but Haskins and J collaborated again in another band which featured guitarist Daniel Ash.

== Influences ==
The beginnings of the post-punk scene had a strong effect on Haskins. He cited drummers who "had an influence on me namely, Stephen Morris from Joy Division and Kenny Morris from Siouxsie and the Banshees. I liked how Stephen played sixteenth notes on the hi hat and he used this wonderful electronic drum called The Synare drum which I ran out and bought immediately! With Kenny I loved how he would use the tom tom drums rather than hi hats and cymbals."

== Bauhaus ==
The band took its name from the German Bauhaus art school and design movement of the 1920s, because of its "stylistic implications and associations", according to David J, who chose the name for the band. The band also chose to use the same typeface used on the Bauhaus school building in Dessau, Germany. Although there were bands before them that prefigured the style, Bauhaus is generally regarded as the first Gothic rock group.

Bauhaus combined a number of influences (punk, glam rock, even funk and dub) to create a gloomy, but passionate sound which appealed to many looking for something new in the wake of punk's collapse. Their sound proved inspiring and brought attention to a whole wave of post-punk groups delving in the gloomy style that would eventually come to be known as gothic rock. Bauhaus became one of the most influential goth rock bands. Bauhaus officially broke up (for the first time) in July 1983.

In 1998, Haskins reunited with Bauhaus for the popular "Resurrection" tour. The band reformed again in 2005 to co-headline the Coachella Valley Music and Arts Festival held in Indio, California, which was followed by another tour through North America, Mexico, and Europe. In the summer of 2006 Bauhaus toured with Nine Inch Nails on the summer leg of the With Teeth tour.

== Tones on Tail / Love and Rockets ==
When Daniel Ash pursued his first side project Tones on Tail with bassist Glenn Campling, he asked Haskins to play drums. He again utilized Kevin for his next band Love and Rockets which also featured David J. Despite their previous band's goth status, Love and Rockets moved away from that genre. Their first release, Seventh Dream of Teenage Heaven (1985), leaned more towards psychedelic music. In 1987, Earth, Sun, Moon had a folkier sound and spawned the minor hit "No New Tale to Tell".

In 1989, Love and Rockets released "So Alive", a top ten hit. After a grueling tour schedule in support of their big hit Love and Rockets took five years off before returning to the studio together. The result was a move to a much more electronic sound that had more in common with the Orb than their rock or Goth roots. A few more records were released including Sweet F.A. and Lift, but interest in the group increasingly dwindled and the band's members went in different directions in 1998. It was then when Kevin decided to make music from his home so he could spend more time with his wife and two daughters.

== Messy Music ==
In the autumn of 1998, Haskins began composing scores for video games, film and television, under the name Messy Music, with partner Doug DeAngelis. The duo met as producer and artist during the making of the Love and Rockets album Lift.

DeAngelis and Haskins describe Messy as electronic alternative music, featuring guests like Michael Balzary from Red Hot Chili Peppers, Jessicka from Scarling., among others. Messy's credits include music for Myst III, The Crow: Salvation, Saw II, 2Gether, NBC's Third Watch, Things Behind the Sun, and trailers for Skechers, PlayStation 2, and IFC.

== Personal life ==
He lives in Los Angeles, California, with his psychologist wife Pamela Dompe, and two daughters, Diva Lynn and Lola Rose. Haskins's daughters were all born in England.

Both daughters played in the band Blackblack. Additionally, Haskins and his daughter Diva are in the band Poptone, with Daniel Ash. Lola Dompe was the drummer in the Los Angeles-based band Automatic from its 2017 founding to 2025.
