= David J =

British rock musician (born 1957)

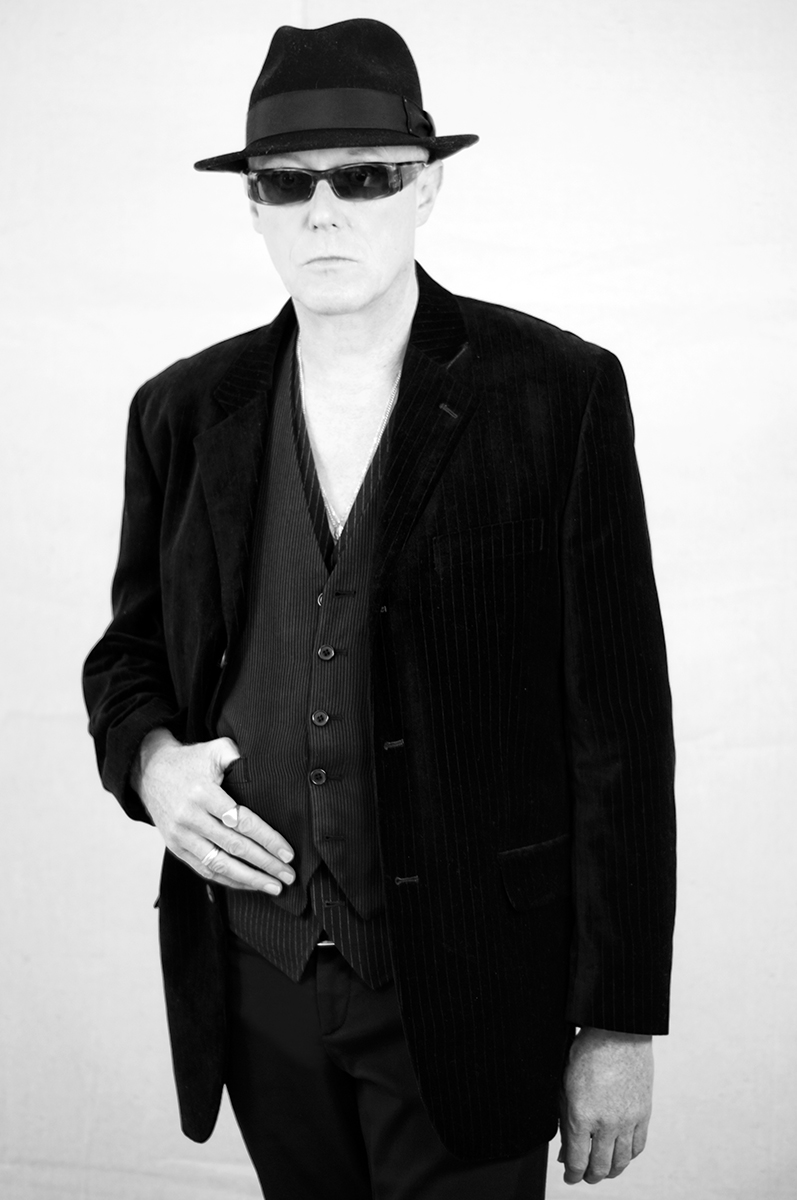
- David J in 2014, photo by Mila Reynaud

Background information
- Born: David John Haskins; 24 April 1957 (age 69); Northampton, Northamptonshire, England
- Genres: Alternative rock; indie folk; gothic rock; post-punk; psychedelic rock
- Instruments: Vocals; bass; guitar; keyboards; harmonica
- Years active: 1979–present
- Labels: MCA; Beggars Banquet; Glass; No Devotion Records
- Formerly of: Bauhaus; Love and Rockets
- Website: Official website

David John Haskins (born 24 April 1957), professionally known as David J, is a British alternative rock musician, producer, and writer. He is the bassist for the gothic rock band Bauhaus and for Love and Rockets.

He has composed the scores for a number of plays and films, and also wrote and directed his own plays, Silver for Gold (The Odyssey of Edie Sedgwick), in 2008, which was restaged at REDCAT in Los Angeles in 2011, and The Chanteuse and The Devil's Muse in 2011. His artwork has been shown in galleries internationally, and he has been a resident DJ at venues such as the Knitting Factory.

David J has released a number of singles and solo albums, and in 1990 he released one of the first No. 1 hits on the then nascent Modern Rock Tracks charts, with "I'll Be Your Chauffeur". His single "The Day That David Bowie Died" entered the UK vinyl singles chart at number 4 in 2016. The track appears on his double album, Vagabond Songs.

David J has also released singles and albums with the Mexican label No Devotion Records.

== Early life ==
David John Haskins was born on 24 April 1957 in Northampton, Northamptonshire, England. He is the elder brother of Kevin Haskins, also a musician and member of Bauhaus and Love and Rockets.

== Music career ==
=== Bauhaus, early years ===
David J was a founding member of the highly influential English post-punk band Bauhaus in 1978, playing bass. David J wrote the lyrics of several Bauhaus songs (including their first single, "Bela Lugosi's Dead"). He sang backing vocals on many songs, and sang lead on "Who Killed Mr Moonlight?". Bauhaus first broke up in 1983, reforming periodically at later times.

His first venture outside of Bauhaus was a collaborative single, "Armour" / "Nothing", with artist and poet René Halkett, of the original Weimar Bauhaus school of art and design.

He began writing music for a solo career while still in the band, and continued after the band's break-up, releasing the dark Etiquette of Violence and Crocodile Tears and the Velvet Cosh, and played bass on two Jazz Butcher albums (A Scandal in Bohemia and Sex and Travel), both of which he also produced. J was also a part of the very short-lived band The Sinister Ducks, which included saxophonist Alex Green and comics writer Alan Moore. J also released an EP that was intended as a soundtrack to Moore's graphic novel V for Vendetta. In 1996, he once again collaborated with Moore alongside musician Tim Perkins when the trio recorded two spoken-word-with-music CDs, The Grand Egyptian Theatre of Marvels and The Birth Caul.

=== Love and Rockets ===
In 1985, J, his brother Kevin Haskins, and Daniel Ash, all former members of Bauhaus, formed Love and Rockets; J once again played bass guitar and also shared songwriting and vocal duties with guitarist Daniel Ash. His most notable lead vocal from this period was the minor hit "No New Tale to Tell". J maintained his solo career during breaks from Love and Rockets, releasing Songs from Another Season and Urban Urbane after his band's success with the single "So Alive". He also released one of the first No. 1 hits from the newly created Modern Rock Tracks charts, with "I'll Be Your Chauffeur". J participated in a Bauhaus reunion in 1998. Love and Rockets broke up in 1999, after seven albums. Following what was billed as a one-off performance of Bauhaus at the 2005 Coachella concert festival, Bauhaus reformed for a successful tour of the Americas in late 2005 and Europe in early 2006 as well as a final album, Go Away White.

=== 2003–2010 ===
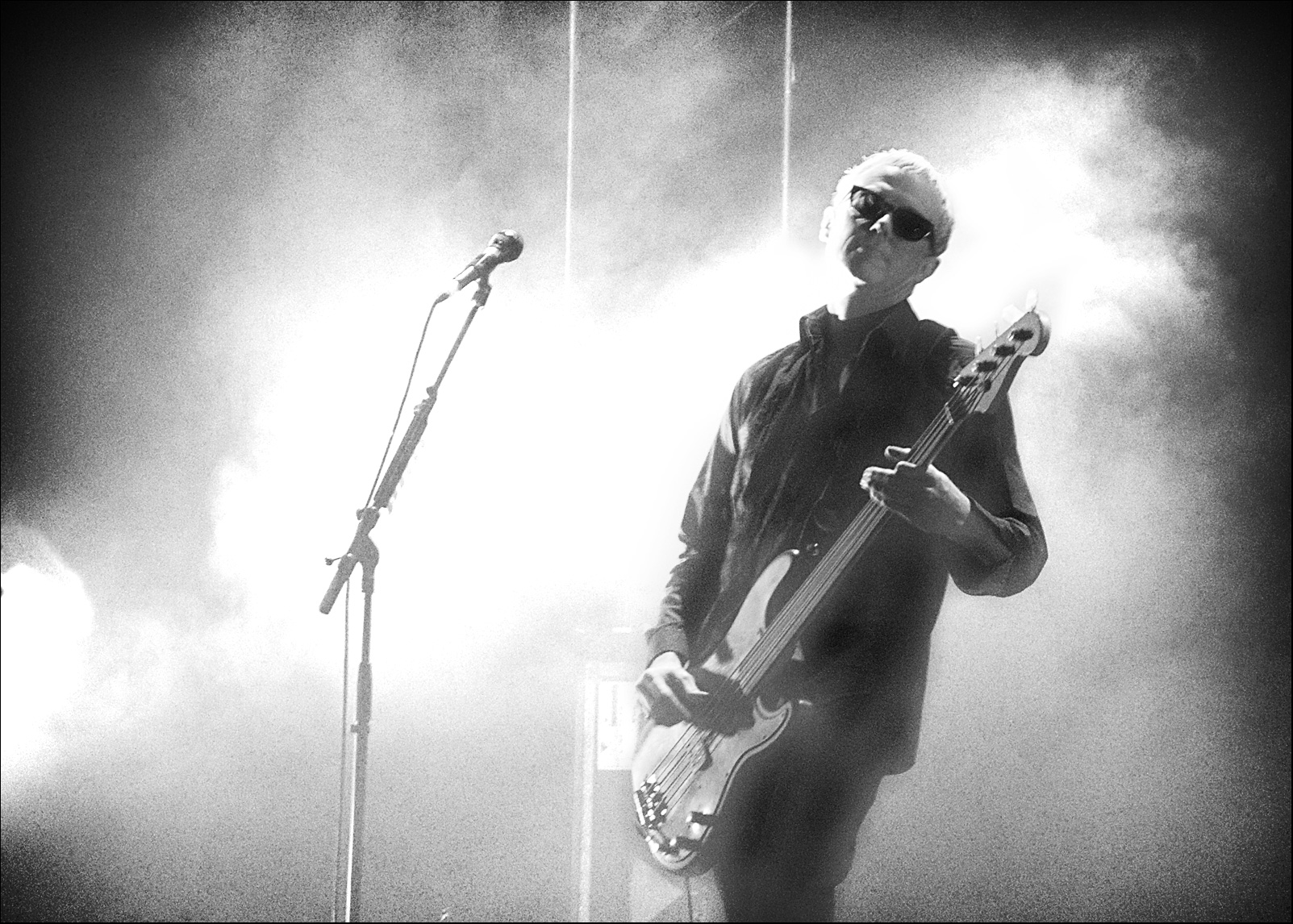
David J performing on bass in 2006

J has also appeared on releases by Porno for Pyros and Jane's Addiction, and co-wrote the latter's 2003 album title track, "Strays". In 2005, J joined with cellist Joyce Rooks and electronica musician Don Tyler to make up the instrumental ensemble Three, who released their first album Evocations later that year. He played bass guitar for several tracks on the electro musician Mount Sims' 2005 release Wild Light.

In 2003, J started work on the song cycle score for an independent film about Elizabeth Short directed by Ramzi Abed, entitled The Devil's Muse. The soundtrack included guest artists and singers such as Ego Plum, Johnny Dowd, Jill Tracy, Abby Travis and Nora Keyes. He has also regularly shown his art in galleries across the globe, as well as being a resident DJ at various Hollywood hot-spots including The Standard Hotel, Kung Pao Kitty, and Knitting Factory.

In 2004, his first play Anarchy in the Gold Street Wimpy was staged in Atlanta by the Dad's Garage' Theatre Company. In 2005, he composed the original music for a stage production of Samuel Beckett's Cascando. In 2008, J wrote and directed a play, Silver for Gold (The Odyssey of Edie Sedgwick), which was restaged at REDCAT in Los Angeles in 2011. In 2008 J also released Go Away White with his Bauhaus bandmates and reformed Love and Rockets, who played at Coachella Music & Arts Festival as well as Lollapalooza that same year.

2008 also saw David J contributing lyrics and vocals on a track entitled "Sleaze" for the Dutch band Strange Attractor. This appeared on their album Mettle (2011). He worked with the band again when he supplied lyrics and vocals on "The Corridor" for the album Anatomy of a Tear (2011). In a similar vein, J wrote the lyrics and sang the lead vocal on the track "Spalding Grey Can't Swim", which appeared on George Sarah's 2012 release Who Sleeps The Sleep of Peace.

=== Recent years ===
In 2011, J released a new solo album that was dark cabaret-oriented, Not Long for This World, and provided bass for Voltaire's album Riding a Black Unicorn Down the Side of an Erupting Volcano While Drinking from a Chalice Filled with the Laughter of Small Children!. The following year he recorded bass for the song "Melody Dean" on the album Theatre Is Evil by Amanda Palmer & the Grand Theft Orchestra. He co-wrote the track "The Autumn Carnival" with Courtney Taylor-Taylor for the Dandy Warhols' album This Machine (2012). Also in 2012, he toured using his opening act Adrian H and the Wounds as a backing band.

David J produced and played bass, organ and sang on Starfishing (2012), the debut album by Darwin. He also co-produced, played bass and appeared on Darwin's follow up EP Souvenir (2014). featured David, Victor DeLorenzo (Violent Femmes) and Emily Jane White.

In 2013, he collaborated with producer Dub Gabriel, playing bass, bells and Farfisa organ alongside U Roy and Juakali. He also played bass on the Dub Gabriel-produced Jajouka Sound System track "Salahadeen", which featured Bashir Attar, leader of The Master Musicians of Jajouka on gaita.

At Halloween 2013, J, in collaboration with Jill Tracy, released "Bela Lugosi's Dead (Undead is Forever)". This was a dramatic cinematic reworking of the original Bauhaus song.

In 2014 David produced and played bass on a cover by Stellarum of the Blondie hit "Heart of Glass", which was met with very positive response from the song's composers Debbie Harry and Chris Stein. He played bass on the band's debut album, which he also produced.

His memoir Who Killed Mister Moonlight? (Bauhaus, Black Magick and Benediction) was published by Jawbone Press in the winter of 2014, to critical acclaim.

In 2015, J performed with Ego Plum on the theme of the Nickelodeon TV show Harvey Beaks.

In 2016, J recorded with the Theatre Bizarre Orchestra for a record entitled Carpe Noctem under the name M.C. Nightshade.

In 2018 J teamed up again with Peter Murphy on a world tour, celebrating 40 years of Bauhaus and in particular the album In the Flat Field.

In 2020 J released the track "(I walk away) from the girl in yellow" for the Mexican label No Devotion Records compilation named "We are not safe yet."

On February 25, 2022, David announced his latest album on Los Angeles/Minneapolis-based label Give/Take in collaboration with Mexicali-based No Devotion Records, What The Patrons Heard. A collection of originals and covers recorded over the timespan of 34 years, originally only available digitally to David J's Patreon subscribers.

On Record Store Day, November 24, 2023, Independent Project Records released Tracks from the Attic, a 3 LP collection of demo recordings from 1984-2004 in a hand-letterpress sleeve. A standard release followed on May 4, 2024.

== Writing credits ==
=== Theatre ===
- 2004: Anarchy in the Gold Street Wimpy – writer
- 2009: Silver for Gold: The Odyssey of Edie Sedgwick – writer, director
- 2011: The Chanteuse and The Devil's Muse – writer, director

=== Books ===
- 2014: Who Killed Mister Moonlight? (Bauhaus, Black Magick and Benediction) (Jawbone Press)

== Discography ==
=== Solo ===
==== Studio albums ====
List of full-length albums by David J
Year	Album title	Release details
1983	Etiquette of Violence	Released: Nov. 1983, 1990, Nov. 2013; Label: Situation Two, Cherry Red; Format: Vinyl, CD
1985	Crocodile Tears and the Velvet Cosh	Released: March 1985, 2006; Label: Glass, Plain Recordings; Format: CD, digital
1986	On Glass (singles compilation)	Released: March 1986, 1998, 2006; Label: Glass, Cleopatra, Plain; Format: LP, cass, CD
1990	Songs from Another Season	Released: June 1990, 1999; Label: Beggars Banquet; Format: LP, cass, CD, digital
1992	Urban Urbane	Released: 1992 (non-UK); Label: MCA; Format: Cass, CD
1996	The Birth Caul by David J/Alan Moore/Tim Perkins	Released: 1996; Label: Charmm Records; Format: CD
1996	The Moon and Serpent Grand Egyptian Theater of Marvels by David J/Alan Moore/Tim Perkins	Released: 1996; Label: Cleopatra; Format: CD
2003	Estranged	Released: 2003 (non-UK); Label: Heyday; Format: CD, digital
2003	Embrace Your Dysfunction (singles compilation)	Released: 2003 (non-UK); Label: Heyday; Format: CD
2005	Evocations (Three)	Released: 2005; Label: Arena Rock Recording Co.; Format: CD
2011	Not Long For This World	Released: 2011; Label: Starry/Saint Rose; Format: CD/LP, digital
2014	An Eclipse of Ships	Released: April 2014
2016	Carpe Noctem (as M.C. Nightshade & the Theatre Bizarre Orchestra)	Released: October 2016; Label: Hold Fast; Format: LP & Single
2022	What The Patrons Heard	Released: March 2022; Label:No Devotion Records, Give/Take; Format: Vinyl, CD, Digital

==== EPs ====
List of studio and live EPs by David J
Year	Album title	Release details
1983	The Promised Land by David J and The J-Walkers	Released: November 1983; Label: Glass Records; Format: 7"/12" vinyl
1984	V for Vendetta by David J	Released: April 1984, 2006; Label: Glass/Plain Recordings (reissue); Format: 12" vinyl, CD
1985	Blue Moods Turning Tail by David J	Released: July 1985; Label: Glass; Format: 12" vinyl
2002	The Guitar Man by David J	Released: 2002; Label: Heyday (non-UK); Format: CD
2003	Mess Up by David J	Released: 2003; Label: Heyday (HEY056-2); Format: CD
2003	The Devils Muse by David J + Ego Plum	Released: 2008; Label: Urbane Music; Format: CD ltd.

==== Singles ====
Incomplete list of singles by David J
Yr	Single	Artist(s)	Label	Notes	
1981	"Nothing/Armour"	David Jay + René Halkett	4AD, Urbane Music	7" vinyl, CD reissue 2001	
1983	"March of the Sinister Ducks"	The Sinister Ducks (David J, Alex Green, Alan Moore)	Situation Two	7" in August 1983	
1983	"Joe Orton's Wedding"	David J	Situation Two	7"/12" vinyl	
1984	"I Can't Shake This Shadow of Fear"	David J	Glass Records	7"/12" vinyl	
1985	"Crocodile Tears And The Velvet Cosh"	David J	Glass Records	7"/12" vinyl	
1990	"I'll Be Your Chauffeur"	David J	Beggars Banquet, RCA (US)	7"/12" vinyl. One of the first No. 1 hits on Modern Rock Tracks	
1990	"Fingers in the Grease"	David J	RCA (non-UK release)	CD	
1992	"Candy on the Cross"	David J	MCA (non-UK release)	CD, 12" vinyl	
1992	"Some Big City"	David J	MCA (non-UK release)	CD, cassette	
1992	"Space Cowboy"	David J	MCA (non-UK release)	CD	
2007	"The Bottle, The Book or the Dollar Bill"	David J & The Glossines	Andromeda Records	7" vinyl ltd. with DVD	
2010	"Hank Williams to the Angel of Death"	David J	iTunes exclusive	Digital	
2010	"Tidal Wave of Blood" / "Blood Sucker Blues"	David J + Shok (with Jill Tracy)	Saint Rose	7", Ltd	
2012	"In The Temple of the Id"	David J + Ego Plum	Custom Made Music	Vinyl, 7", Ltd	
2013	"Bela Lugosi's Dead (undead is forever)	David J + Jill Tracy	2026	Ice Too Cold To Thaw|No Devotion Records	Digital
2014	Toxic covering Britney Spears	David J + Adrian H, with The Wounds & Sasha Grey		Digital on YouTube	

=== Film and theatre scores ===
- 2003: Cascando by Samuel Beckett (no label)
- 2007: The Devil's Muse (Ebola Music)
- 2009: Silver for Gold: The Odyssey of Edie Sedgwick by David J (Urban Urbane Music)
- 2012: The Chanteuse and The Devil's Muse (Urban Urbane)

=== Contributing musician ===
As a musician

- 1984: A Scandal in Bohemia by Jazz Butcher – bass, glockenspiel
- 1985: Sex and Travel by Jazz Butcher – bass
- 1996: "Porpoise Head" by Porno for Pyros – bass
- 2003: "Strays" by Jane's Addiction – bass
- 2003: "She's in Fiesta's" by Panoptica – bass
- 2005: Evocations by Three (David J, Joyce Rooks, Don Tyler) – bass, arrangements
- 2005: Wild Light by Mount Sims – bass
- 2005: "Splinters of The Cross" by Basic – lead vocal
- 2005: "Angel David" from The Men Album by Jarboe – vocals / lyrics (with Robert Kaechele – programming)
- 2008: "Sleaze" by Strange Attractor – lead vocal
- 2008: Repo! The Genetic Opera (movie soundtrack) – bass
- 2010: "Stormwinds" by Armed Love Militia (Fairuza Balk & John Flannery) – bass, keys
- 2011: "The Corridor" by Strange Attractor – lead vocal
- 2011: "Salahadeen" by Jajouka Soundsystem (Bachir Attar & Dub Gabriel) – bass
- 2011: Riding a Black Unicorn by Voltaire – bass
- 2012: Starfishing by Darwin – production, bass, organ, vocals
- 2012: Theatre Is Evil by Amanda Palmer & the Grand Theft Orchestra – bass on track "Melody Dean"
- 2012: "Spalding Grey Can't Swim" by George Sarah – lead vocal
- 2013: "Luv n Liv" by U-Roy + Dub Gabriel – bass, glockenspiel
- 2013: "Take You Back" by Juakali + Dub Gabriel – bass, Farfisa organ
- 2013: "Take You Deep", "Blood Bound", "Voyage of The Damned" – shared vocals (with Johnette Napolitano) & acoustic guitar
- 2014: "Heart of Glass" by Stellarum – bass
- 2014: "Stellarum" by Stellarum – bass
- 2014: Souvenir EP by Darwin – co-production, bass
- 2020: Oracle Of The Horizontal by Duende with David J – production, lead vocals, bass

As a songwriter

- 2003: Strays by Jane's Addiction – co-wrote track "Strays"
- 2005: Splinters of The Cross by Basic – co-wrote track "Splinters of The Cross"
- 2005: The Men Album by Jarboe – co-wrote track "Angel"
- 2008: Mettle by Strange Attractor – co-wrote track "Sleaze"
- 2011: "Anatomy of a Tear" by Strange Attractor – co-wrote track "The Corridor"
- 2012: "Who Sleeps The Sleep of Peace" by George Sarah – co-wrote track "Spalding Grey Can't Swim"
- 2013: "Take You Deep", "Blood Bound", "Voyage of The Damned" by Tres Vampires – co-wrote tracks
- 2014: "This Machine" by the Dandy Warhols – co-wrote track "The Autumn Carnival"
- 2020: Oracle Of The Horizontal by Duende with David J

== See also ==
- Bauhaus
- Love and Rockets
