= Daniel Ash =

English singer-songwriter (born 1957)

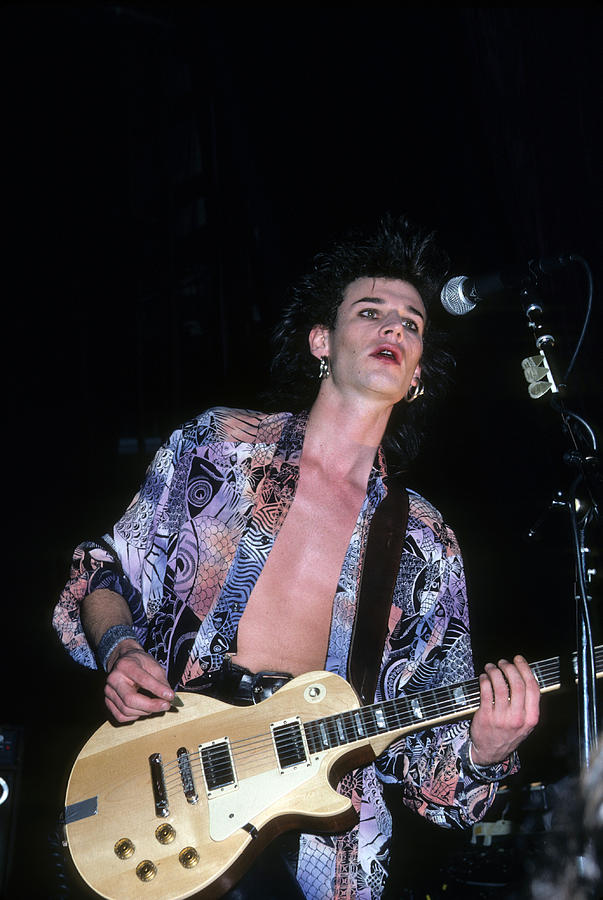
- Ash on stage with Love and Rockets, c. 1989

Background information
- Born: Daniel Gaston Ash; 31 July 1957 (age 69); Northampton, Northamptonshire, England
- Genres: Alternative rock; gothic rock; post-punk; electronic
- Instruments: Vocals; guitar; keyboards; saxophone
- Years active: 1979–present
- Labels: Columbia; Beggars Banquet
- Member of: Poptone
- Formerly of: Bauhaus; Love and Rockets; Tones on Tail; The Bubblemen

Daniel Gaston Ash (born 31 July 1957) is an English musician, songwriter and singer. He became prominent in the late 1970s as the guitarist for the goth rock band Bauhaus, which spawned two related bands led by Ash: Tones on Tail, Love and Rockets and more recently Ashes and Diamonds. He also reunited with bandmate Kevin Haskins to form Poptone, a retrospective of their respective careers, featuring Kevin's daughter Diva Dompe on bass. He has also recorded several solo albums. Several guitarists have listed Ash as an influence, including Dave Navarro of Jane's Addiction, Kim Thayil of Soundgarden, Hide of X Japan and John Frusciante of the Red Hot Chili Peppers.

== Life and work ==
Ash was born to a half-French and half-Belgian mother and spent his childhood in Northampton. After going to concerts in his teenage years, Ash decided to perform on a stage in some way. He started playing guitar around the age of 15, but confessed to having been very lazy and learning only three chords, and nothing more, for about three years. He began playing in cover bands, often together with future bandmates David J and Kevin Haskins, whom he had known since nursery school. His first gig was in the Glasgow Rangers Workman's Club.

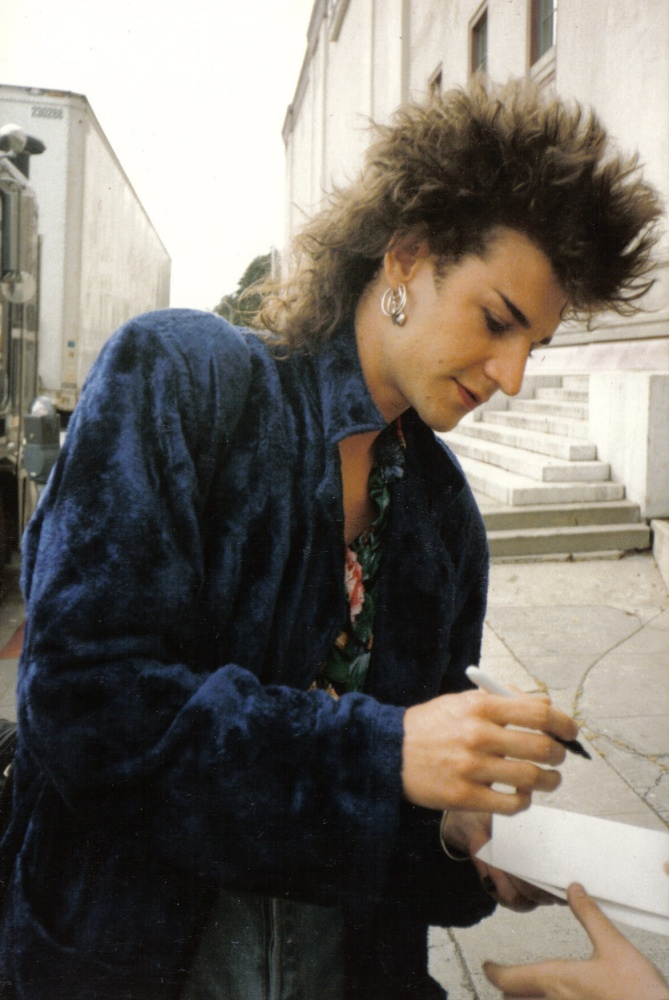
Daniel Ash in 1986, while in Love and Rockets

Ash had become friends with Peter Murphy during his teenage years. Ash went to art school and Murphy went to work in a printing factory. They met up again five years later and Ash suggested forming a band. Rigging up a makeshift rehearsal space, Ash played a 12-bar blues, while Murphy sang a series of newspaper articles. Four weeks later, they formed Bauhaus and recorded "Bela Lugosi's Dead".

That song, released in 1979, became one of the most influential songs in gothic rock music, even though they saw themselves as a "dark glam" band and have always distanced themselves from the gothic label. From early on, he was intent on sounding original, and often tried to "make the guitar not sound like a guitar". He worked to develop a guitar style that included other-worldly and atmospheric sounds. In an interview with John Robb, he said that he first bought an EBow in 1981. He typically has used a Telecaster guitar, HH amplifiers and Marshall 4x12 cabinets for his stage gear. Later in his career, he relied heavily on the Fernandes Sustainer system to achieve sounds similar to the EBow.

After nearly five years of recording and performing, Bauhaus broke up and Ash put together Tones on Tail with Bauhaus drummer Kevin Haskins. As Ash described them: "We were a motley crew of individuals who essentially wanted to sound like a band from Venus or Mars!" In 1984, Tones on Tail was disbanded; Ash founded Love and Rockets in 1985 with Haskins and David J, also of Bauhaus. In an interview in June 2009, Ash emphatically stated that he had no further plans to play with Love and Rockets.

Ash has stated that guitar solos do not interest him much, since they rely on a musician's ego. He cares much more for the craft of songwriting and the overall production of a song rather than a focus on guitar or any other single instrument. During the last ten years, he has been experimenting more with electronic music, both with Love and Rockets and solo, limiting the use of guitar as an extra element to the songs. In an extensive interview by Visual Music Japan (VMJ) with Mandah Frénot, Ash said:

"Shredding is all testosterone and ego (laughs) — just too academic. It becomes this exercise in cramming as many notes as possible into three seconds. It's like ego-wanking, really. No soul, no feeling [...] It leaves me absolutely cold [...] By the time I picked up a guitar, it felt like everything had already been done — and done better than I could do it. I mean, I loved Jimi Hendrix, but what's the point in trying to compete with someone who was already a master? I just didn't see any originality in copying that kind of playing. Also — and I've said this before — I was probably a bit lazy. I didn't have the discipline or the interest to learn scales or technique in that academic way. That route just didn't appeal to me. So, I went the experimental path because it felt more creative and more authentic to who I was. I never even considered doing it the normal way — I was just following what felt interesting to me."

In 1994, Ash moved to Los Angeles for the motorcycle culture, one of his passions. Ash said:

"I've loved bikes ever since I was about twelve. My dad had Lambretta scooters, and I'd sneak out on those around the neighborhood. The day I was legally old enough to ride a motorcycle, I was on one. From about 16 or 17, I've always had a bike on the road. Living near the mountains now means I can get out of the city every day if I want. I really appreciate that solitude more and more as I grow older. Riding has been part of my life since I was twelve years old. It's more than a hobby — it's how I stay mentally balanced. I never go for a walk, I don't swim, I don't do yoga, I don't meditate — I ride bikes. Every day, if I can. It's the one thing that resets me. If I'm feeling low, anxious, depressed, or just scattered, a long ride puts me right again. Some people might find peace in nature or through exercise."

In 2008, Bauhaus released Go Away White, (their first studio album in 25 years) which was followed by a world tour.

Love and Rockets played at Coachella Music and Arts Festival and Lollapalooza in 2008.

In June 2009, Ash released a cover of the David Essex song "Rock On", featuring singer Zak Ambrose on vocals. Recorded at the Swing House rehearsal and recording complex in Hollywood, the track is on the Swing House Sessions Vol 1 EP. Later in 2009, Ash released a four-song EP exclusively through iTunes, entitled "It's A Burn Out".

In March 2017, Daniel Ash, Kevin Haskins and Haskin's daughter Diva Dompé announced Poptone and a US tour, featuring songs by Tones on Tail, Love and Rockets and Bauhaus.

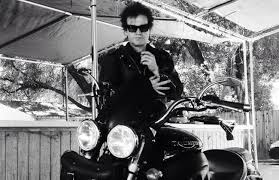
Daniel Ash with a motorcycle

In 2020, during the COVID-19 pandemic, Ash created a new band, Ashes and Diamonds, comprising Paul Denman on bass, formerly of Sade, and Bruce Smith the former drummer with The Pop Group, Rip Rig + Panic and Public Image Ltd.

Ash joined Jane's Addiction on stage at Madison Square Garden in 2022 to perform Jane's Addiction's "Jane Says" and "Slice of Life" by Bauhaus.

Love and Rockets reunited in 2023 for a short reunion tour of the United States between May and June 2023, making their first performance since 2008 at Pasadena's annual Cruel World Festival at the Rose Bowl.

Ash reunited with Kevin Haskins and Diva Dompe under the Tones on Tail moniker at Cruel World in May 2024.

Ashes and Diamonds had begun to record in 2020 but due to the pandemic, the release was postponed. Ashes and Diamonds released their debut album, Ashes and Diamonds are Forever on October 31, 2025 via Cleopatra Records to outstanding reviews. Ash wrote many of the lyrics for the album: " “So they’d send me stuff, and I’d get the headphones on. I used this cut-up method that William Burroughs used, as did David Bowie. I’d get a bunch of headlines from tacky magazines: The Sun, The National Enquirer. All the gossip mags! They’d have all the best headlines, so I’d cut them up and put them on the kitchen table [while] listening to the backing tracks. If I were lucky, I’d get a song out of it by the end of the day. All this mix and match!”

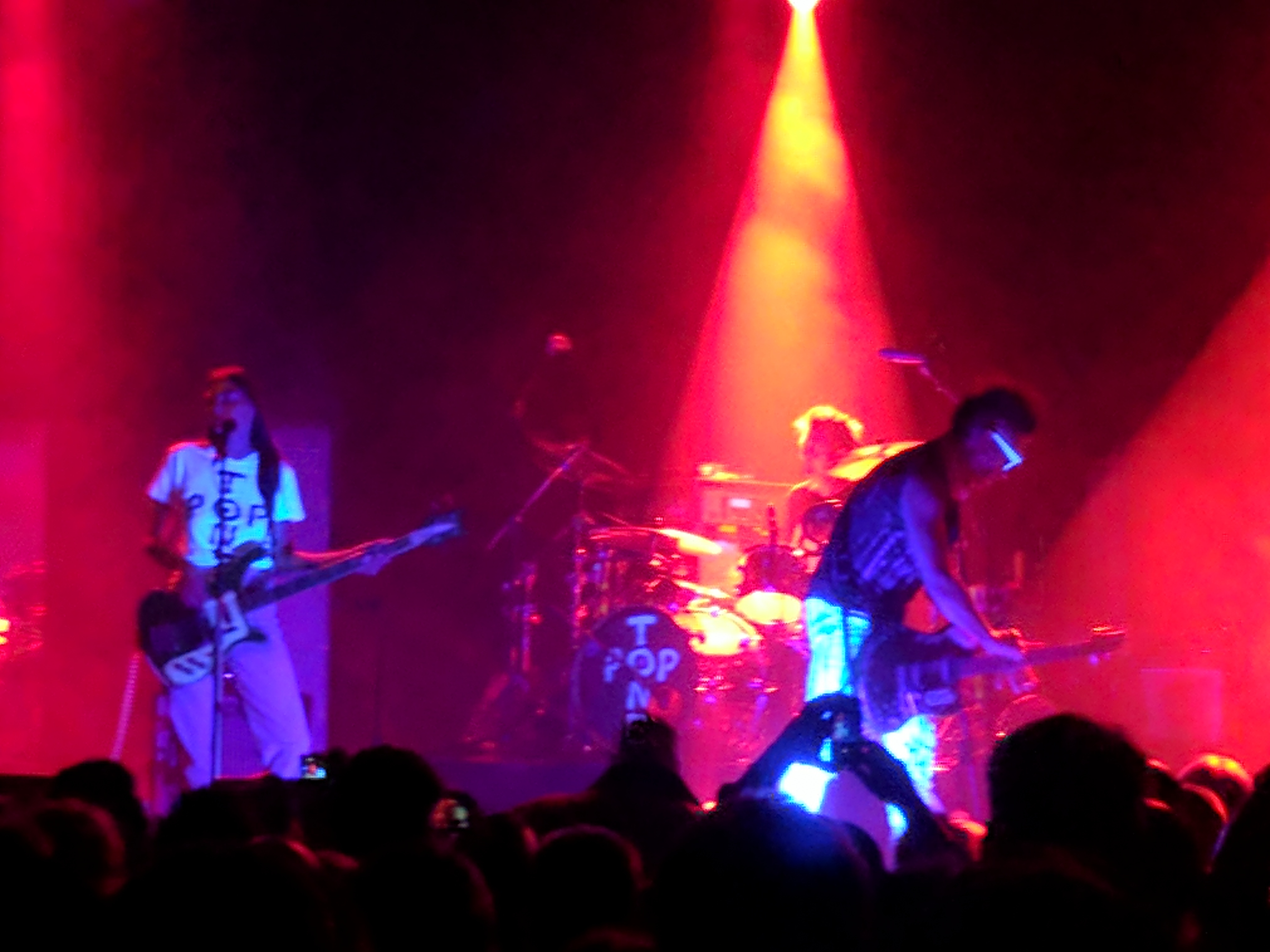
Poptone (Daniel Ash, Kevin Haskins, Diva Dompé) performing at the Regency Ballroom in San Francisco.

== Discography as band member ==
- Bauhaus discography
- Tones on Tail discography
- Love and Rockets discography
- The Bubblemen Discography

== Solo discography ==
=== Studio albums ===
Year	Album details
1990	Coming Down: Label: Beggars Banquet Records
1992	Foolish Thing Desire: Label: Beggars Banquet Records
2002	Daniel Ash: Label: Psychobaby Records
2005	Come Alive: Label: Psychobaby Records
2014	Stripped: Label: GO! Studio [Reissued 2016 by MVD / Main Man]
2017	Freedom I Love

=== Singles, EPs and promos ===
Year	Album information
1990	"This Love": Label: Beggars Banquet Records
1991	"Walk This Way": Label: Vertigo Records
1992	"Get Out of Control": Label: Columbia Records/Sony BMG/Beggars Banquet Records
1993	"Here She Comes": Label: Columbia Records/Sony BMG/Beggars Banquet Records
2000	Daniel Ash EP: Label: Self Released
2000	"Burning Man": Label: Plastik Records
2001	"Spooky": Label: Psychobaby Records
2002	Burning Man x6 + 1: Label: Psychobaby Records
2009	"Rock On (Dirty Queen)": Label: Arsenal Records
2009	It's A Burn Out EP: iTunes Exclusive
2010	The Soldiers of Everyday: Label: Self Released
2011	The Push: iTunes Exclusive
2011	That's What She Said: iTunes Exclusive

=== Compilations ===
Year	Album information
2013	Anthology: Label: Cherry Red; Contained his two albums for Beggars Banquet with B-sides and a bonus disc of collaborations, compilations tracks and more.

=== Other ===
- 1991 – "Heaven Is Waiting", a B-side from the "This Love" and "Walk This Way" singles, was included on the Beggars Banquet Records compilation album Money Is Not the Answer
- 2000 – "Trouble" from Daniel Ash appeared in the 2000 film American Psycho
- 2001 – Ash provided vocals and guitar on the title track from DJ Keoki's album Jealousy
- 2003 – Ash recorded a version of "Fever" for the FX (TV network) program Nip/Tuck, which was included on the Nip/Tuck: Original TV Soundtrack
- 2004 – "Come Alive" from Daniel Ash appeared in the role-playing video game Vampire: The Masquerade – Bloodlines
- 2008 – Ash provided guitar on several tracks from the rock opera film Repo! The Genetic Opera.
- 2017 – Ash remixed the track "maniera" for sukekiyo's Adoratio album, released in June.
