= Bauhaus discography =

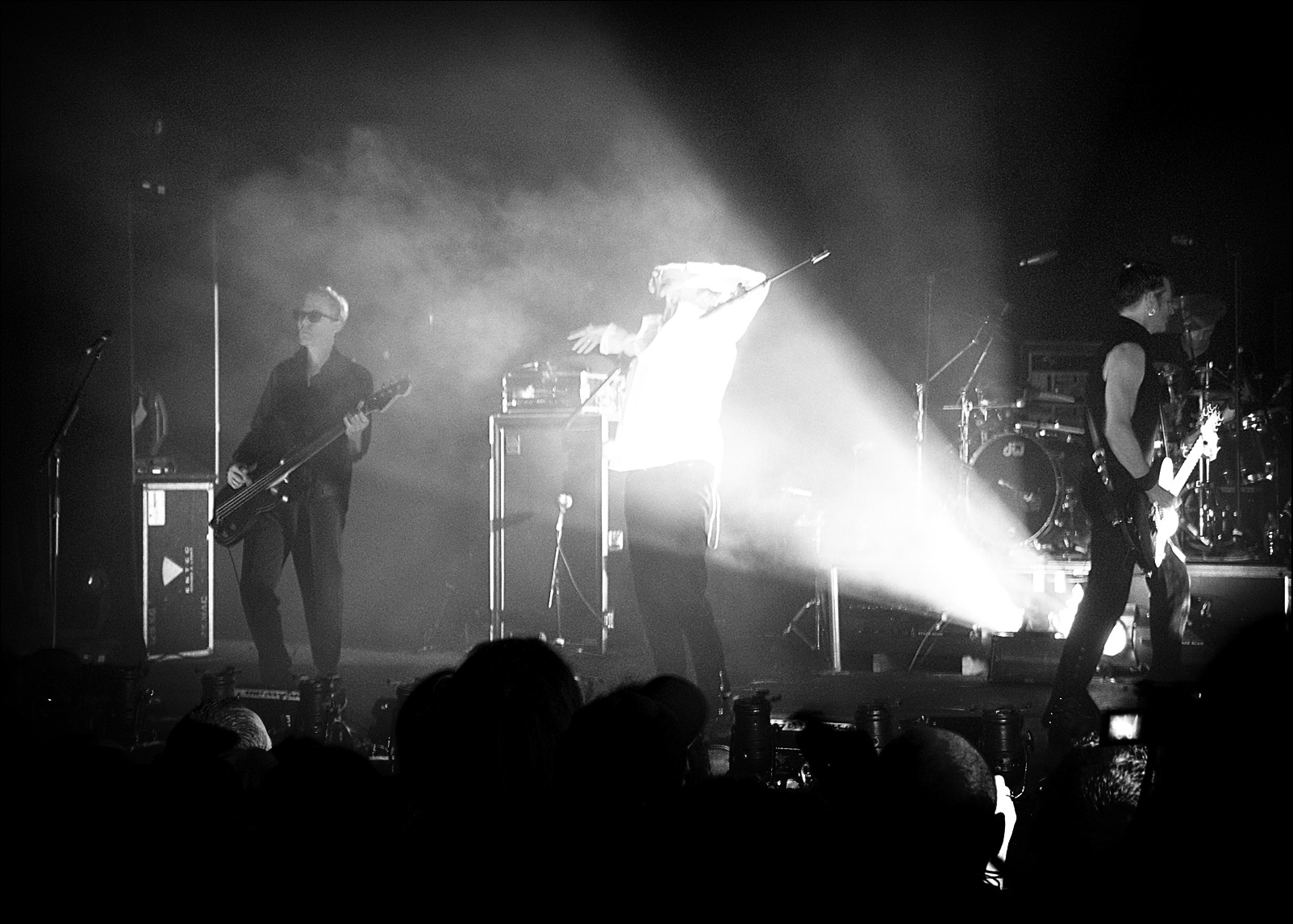
- Bauhaus in concert in 2006
- Studio albums: 5
- Extended plays: 5
- Live albums: 4
- Compilation albums: 3
- Singles: 11
- Video albums: 3
- Music videos: 5

The discography of Bauhaus, a British gothic rock band, consists of five studio albums, four live albums, three compilation albums, four extended plays (EPs), eleven singles and three video albums. The band was formed in Northampton in 1978 by Daniel Ash (guitar), David J (bass), Kevin Haskins (drums) and Peter Murphy (vocals).

Released in August 1979 on Small Wonder Records, Bauhaus's debut single—the nine-minute-long "Bela Lugosi's Dead"—failed to make the UK Singles Chart. The band signed with 4AD in 1980 and released three more singles, all of which failed to chart. They also released their debut album, In the Flat Field, in 1980 and this became the band's first release to chart when it reached No. 72 on the UK Albums Chart. After changing labels again in 1981 to Beggars Banquet Records, the band made the UK Singles Chart for the first time with "Kick in the Eye", which reached No. 59.

Their follow-up single, "The Passion of Lovers", reached No. 56. After the band's second album, Mask (1981), reached No. 30 on the UK Albums Chart, the next two singles failed to reach the Top 40 of the UK Singles Chart. October 1982 saw the band's highest showing in the UK Singles Chart when they released a cover version of David Bowie's "Ziggy Stardust", which reached No. 15—as well as reaching No. 13 on the Irish Singles Chart. Also released in October 1982, The Sky's Gone Out reached No. 4 on the UK Albums Chart. The band released two more singles and an album in 1983, all of which failed to capitalise on the success of their releases in late 1982, before disbanding.

After disbanding, all four members of Bauhaus undertook various solo projects before Ash, David J and Kevin Haskins reformed as Love and Rockets in 1985. Bauhaus reformed for the Resurrection Tour in 1998 and for a one-off concert in April 2005. Another reunion tour followed towards the end of 2005, before work started on a new album Go Away White, released in March 2008. The album charted poorly, only reaching No. 120 on the UK Albums Chart, but gave the band their first entry for a studio album on the US Billboard 200 when it reached No. 105. Following the release of the album, Bauhaus disbanded again.

== Albums ==
=== Studio albums ===
List of studio albums, with selected chart positions and certifications
Title	Details	Peak chart positions					Certifications
Title	Details	UK	UK Indie	FRA	NZ	US	Certifications
In the Flat Field	Released: 7 November 1980; Label: 4AD; Formats: LP, MC	72	1	—	—	—	
Mask	Released: 16 October 1981; Label: Beggars Banquet; Formats: LP, MC	30	—	—	—	—	BPI: Silver
The Sky's Gone Out	Released: 22 October 1982; Label: Beggars Banquet; Formats: LP, MC	4	—	—	26	—	BPI: Silver
Burning from the Inside	Released: 15 July 1983; Label: Beggars Banquet; Formats: LP, MC	13	—	—	—	—	
Go Away White	Released: 3 March 2008; Label: Bauhaus Music, Cooking Vinyl; Formats: LP, CD, digital download	120	13	183	—	105	
"—" denotes a recording that did not chart or was not released in that territory.

=== Live albums ===
List of live albums, with selected details
Title	Details
Press the Eject and Give Me the Tape	Released: 10 December 1982; Label: Beggars Banquet; Formats: LP, CD; First released as a bonus disc with initial copies of The Sky's Gone Out
Rest in Peace: The Final Concert	Released: August 1992; Label: Nemo; Format: 2×CD
Live in the Studio 1979	Released: 1997; Label: Nemo; Format: CD; Distributed with the book Beneath the Mask.
Gotham	Released: November 1999; Label: Metropolis; Format: 2×CD
This Is for When...	Released: November 2009; Label: Vinyl 180; Format: 2×LP; On CD as part of the Omnibus edition of Mask but released separately on vinyl

=== Compilation albums ===
List of compilation albums, with selected chart positions and certifications
Title	Details	Peak chart positions		Certifications
Title	Details	UK	US	Certifications
Bauhaus 1979–1983	Released: November 1985; Label: Beggars Banquet; Formats: 2×LP, MC, CD; Released as two separate CDs: 1979–1983 Volume 1 and 1979–1983 Volume 2.	36	—	BPI: Silver
Swing the Heartache: The BBC Sessions	Released: 10 July 1989; Label: Beggars Banquet; Formats: 2×LP, MC, CD	—	169	
Crackle	Released: 7 July 1998; Label: Beggars Banquet; Format: CD	—	—	
Singles	Released: 22 November 2013; Label: Beggars Banquet; Format: CD, vinyl, digital download	—	—	
"—" denotes a recording that did not chart or was not released in that territory.

=== Video albums ===
List of video albums, with selected details
Title	Details
Shadow of Light	Released: 1984; Labels: Beggars Banquet, Hendring; Formats: VHS, Betamax, Laserdisc, DVD^{^{[A]}}
Archive	Released: 1984; Label: Beggars Banquet; Formats: VHS, Laserdisc, DVD^{^{[A]}}
Gotham	Released: 1999; Label: Metropolis; Formats: VHS, DVD

- A^{^1^2} DVD release contains Shadow of Light and Archive.

== EPs ==
List of EPs, with selected details
Title	Details	UK	UK Indie	NZ
Kick in the Eye (Searching for Satori E.P.)	Released: February 1982; Label: Beggars Banquet; Formats: 7", 12"	45	—	—
Bauhaus E.P.	Released: February 1983; Label: A&M; Format: 7"	—	—	—
4AD	Released: September 1983; Label: 4AD; Format: 12"	81	5	30
The Singles 1981–1983	Released: October 1983; Label: Beggars Banquet; Format: 12"	52	—	—
The Bela Session	Released: 23 November 2018; Label: Leaving Records; Format: CD, DL, 12"	—	—	—
"—" denotes a recording that did not chart or was not released in that territory.

== Singles ==
List of singles, with selected chart positions
Title	Year	Peak chart positions					Album
Title	Year	UK	UK Indie	IRE	NZ	US Dance	Album
"Bela Lugosi's Dead"	1979	—	8	—	—	—	non-album singles
"Dark Entries"	1980	—	17	—	—	—	non-album singles
"Terror Couple Kill Colonel"	1980	—	5	—	—	—	non-album singles
"Telegram Sam"	1980	—	3	—	12	—	non-album singles
"Kick in the Eye"	1981	59	—	—	—	29	Mask
"The Passion of Lovers"	1981	56	—	—	—	—	Mask
"Spirit"	1982	42	—	—	—	—	The Sky's Gone Out
"Ziggy Stardust"	1982	15	—	13	20	—	non-album singles
"Lagartija Nick"	1983	44	—	—	—	—	non-album singles
"She's in Parties"	1983	26	—	28	47	—	Burning from the Inside
"Drink the New Wine"	2022	—	—	—	—	—	non-album single
"—" denotes a recording that did not chart or was not released in that territory.

=== Other singles ===
Title	Year	Notes	Album
"Satori in Paris"	1982	Inserted into LP copies of ''Press the Eject and Give Me the Tape''.	non-album singles
"A God in an Alcove"	1982	Released as part of a ''Flexipop'' magazine promo.	non-album singles
"The Sanity Assassin"	1983	Released as a free fan club single.	non-album singles

== Music videos ==
List of music videos
Title	Year	Director
"Telegram Sam"	1980	Mick Calvert
"Mask"	1981	Christopher Collins
"Spirit"	1982	Christopher Collins
"Ziggy Stardust"	1982	Mick Calvert
"She's in Parties"	1983	Howard Guard
