= Crackle (album) =

Greatest hits album by Bauhaus
- Released: 7 July 1998
- Recorded: 1979–1983
- Genre: Post-punk, gothic rock
- Length: 75:26
- Label: Beggars Banquet
- Producer: Bauhaus

Bauhaus compilation album chronology
Swing the Heartache: The BBC Sessions (1989)	Crackle (1998)

Crackle (also known as Crackle: Best of Bauhaus) is a greatest hits album by English goth-rock band Bauhaus. The album was released in 1998 by record label Beggars Banquet, during the band's Resurrection Tour. It includes remastered versions of some of their single hits and most popular songs.

== Content ==
Crackle is a considerably shorter compilation of Bauhaus's work than their previous 'best of' album 1979-1983. A booklet accompanying the CD contains photographs, excerpts from the lyrics, credits, discography and a poem.

== Release and reception ==
Professional ratings
Review scores
Source	Rating
AllMusic	4.5/5 stars
Pitchfork	8.8/10

Crackle was released in 1998 by record label Beggars Banquet, during the band's Resurrection Tour.

Stephen Thomas Erlewine of AllMusic described it as "an excellent single-disc overview" of the group's work.

== Track listing ==
All tracks are written by Bauhaus (Daniel Ash, Kevin Haskins, David J and Peter Murphy), except "Ziggy Stardust" written by David Bowie

No.	Title	Length
1.	"Double Dare" (from In the Flat Field)	4:53
2.	"In the Flat Field" (from In the Flat Field)	5:02
3.	"The Passion of Lovers" (from Mask)	3:53
4.	"Bela Lugosi's Dead" (non-album single)	9:36
5.	"Sanity Assassin" (non-album single)	4:11
6.	"She's in Parties" (edit, from Burning from the Inside)	3:45
7.	"Silent Hedges" (from The Sky's Gone Out)	3:11
8.	"Hollow Hills" (from Mask)	4:47
9.	"Mask" (from Mask)	4:37
10.	"Kick in the Eye" (alternate version; original version from Mask)	3:37
11.	"Ziggy Stardust" (non-album single)	3:14
12.	"Dark Entries" (non-album single)	3:52
13.	"Terror Couple Kill Colonel" (non-album single)	4:24
14.	"Spirit" (alternate version / edit, from The Sky's Gone Out)	3:47
15.	"Burning from the Inside" (from Burning from the Inside)	9:23
16.	"Crowds" (B-side to "Telegram Sam" single)	3:14

== Personnel ==
Bauhaus

- Daniel Ash – guitar
- Kevin Haskins – drums, percussion
- David J – bass guitar
- Peter Murphy – vocals

Technical

- John Dent – remastering
- Steve Webbon – coordination
- Coleman Barks – translation
- Dominic Davies – sleeve photography
- Antoine Giacomoni – sleeve portraits
- Mitch Jenkins – sleeve portraits
- Timothy O'Donnell – sleeve design
- Rumi – poetry
