= Bauhaus 1979–1983 =

Compilation album by Bauhaus
- Released: November 1985
- Genres: Post-punk; gothic rock
- Label: Beggars Banquet
- Producers: Bauhaus, Hugh Jones

Bauhaus compilations chronology
The Singles 1981–1983 (1983)	Bauhaus 1979–1983 (1985)	Swing the Heartache: The BBC Sessions (1989)

Professional ratings
Review scores
Source	Rating
AllMusic	4.5/5 stars

Bauhaus 1979–1983 (sometimes referred to as simply 1979–1983) is a compilation album by English post-punk band Bauhaus, released in 1985 by record label Beggars Banquet.

== Release ==
Bauhaus 1979–1983 was originally released as a double album on vinyl in 1985. The album reached number 36 on the UK Albums Chart and has been certified silver by the British Phonographic Industry.

It was first released on CD in 1986 in two volumes as 1979–1983 Volume 1 and 1979–1983 Volume 2.

In 2009, Volume 1 was named by Spin as one of eight essential goth music albums.

== Track listing ==
All tracks are written by Bauhaus, except as noted.

Side 1
No.	Title	Originally released on	Length
1.	"Double Dare"	In the Flat Field
2.	"In the Flat Field"	In the Flat Field
3.	"Dark Entries"	non-album single
4.	"Stigmata Martyr"	In the Flat Field
5.	"Bela Lugosi's Dead" (Live Version)	Press the Eject and Give Me the Tape

Side 2
No.	Title	Writer(s)	Originally released on	Length
1.	"Telegram Sam"	Marc Bolan	non-album single
2.	"St. Vitus Dance"		In the Flat Field
3.	"Spy in the Cab"		In the Flat Field
4.	"Terror Couple Kill Colonel"		non-album single
5.	"The Passion of Lovers"		Mask
6.	"Mask"		Mask

Side 3
No.	Title	Writer(s)	Originally released on	Length
1.	"Kick in the Eye"		Mask
2.	"Hollow Hills"		Mask
3.	"In Fear of Fear"		Mask
4.	"Ziggy Stardust"	David Bowie	non-album single
5.	"Silent Hedges"		The Sky's Gone Out
6.	"Lagartija Nick"		non-album single

Side 4
No.	Title	Writer(s)	Originally released on	Length
1.	"Third Uncle"	Brian Eno	The Sky's Gone Out
2.	"Spirit"		The Sky's Gone Out
3.	"All We Ever Wanted"		The Sky's Gone Out
4.	"She's in Parties"		Burning from the Inside
5.	"Sanity Assassin"		non-album single
6.	"Crowds"		"Telegram Sam" single

1986 CD version disc one: 1979–1983, Volume 1
No.	Title	Writer(s)	Originally released on	Length
1.	"Double Dare"
2.	"In the Flat Field"
3.	"Dark Entries"
4.	"Stigmata Martyr"
5.	"Bela Lugosi's Dead (Live Version)"
6.	"God in an Alcove"		non-album single
7.	"Telegram Sam"	Bolan
8.	"St. Vitus Dance"
9.	"A Spy in the Cab"
10.	"Terror Couple Kill Colonel"
11.	"Dancing"		Mask
12.	"Hair of the Dog"		Mask
13.	"The Passion of Lovers"
14.	"Mask"

Disc two: 1979–1983, Volume 2
No.	Title	Writer(s)	Originally released on	Length
1.	"Kick in the Eye"
2.	"Hollow Hills"
3.	"In Fear of Fear"
4.	"Ziggy Stardust"	Bowie
5.	"Silent Hedges"
6.	"Lagartija Nick"
7.	"Paranoia, Paranoia"		"Lagartija Nick" B-side
8.	"Swing the Heartache"		The Sky's Gone Out
9.	"Third Uncle"	Eno
10.	"Spirit"
11.	"All We Ever Wanted Was Everything"
12.	"Slice of Life"		Burning from the Inside
13.	"She's in Parties"
14.	"Sanity Assassin"
15.	"Who Killed Mr. Moonlight?"		Burning from the Inside
16.	"Satori"		"Kick in the Eye"
17.	"Crowds"

== Personnel ==
=== Bauhaus ===
- Peter Murphy – vocals
- Daniel Ash – guitar, vocals, saxophone, piano, keyboards
- David J – bass, vocals
- Kevin Haskins – drums, percussion

=== Technical personnel ===
- Peter Murphy, Daniel Ash, David J, Kevin Haskins – producer
- Hugh Jones – producer ("Spirit")
