= Rest in Peace: The Final Concert =

Live album by Bauhaus
- Released: August 1992
- Recorded: 5 July 1983
- Studio: Hammersmith Palais, London, England
- Length: 96:51
- Label: Nemo

Bauhaus live albums chronology
Press the Eject and Give Me the Tape (1982)	Rest in Peace: The Final Concert (1992)	Live in the Studio 1979 (1997)

Professional ratings
Review scores
Source	Rating
AllMusic	2/5 stars

Rest in Peace: The Final Concert is a live album by English gothic rock band Bauhaus of a concert performed in 1983 at the Hammersmith Palais in London.

The first disc is the concert and the second disc is the encore.

== Track listing ==
Disc one
No.	Title	Length
1.	"(Introduction) Satori"	4:36
2.	"Burning from the Inside"	7:09
3.	"In Fear of Fear"	3:21
4.	"Terror Couple Kill Colonel"	3:45
5.	"The Spy in the Cab"	4:46
6.	"Kingdom's Coming"	3:35
7.	"She's in Parties"	4:15
8.	"Antonin Artaud"	3:41
9.	"King Volcano"	2:51
10.	"Passion of Lovers"	3:31
11.	"Slice of Life"	3:42
12.	"In Heaven"	3:01
13.	"Dancing"	2:54
14.	"Hollow Hills"	5:27
15.	"Stigmata Martyr"	3:40
16.	"Kick in the Eye"	3:21
17.	"Dark Entries"	4:34

Disc two
No.	Title	Length
1.	"Double Dare"	4:58
2.	"In the Flat Field"	4:20
3.	"Boys"	2:41
4.	"God in an Alcove"	4:04
5.	"Hair of the Dog"	2:53
6.	"Bela Lugosi's Dead"	9:46

== Personnel ==
- Peter Murphy – vocals, guitar
- Daniel Ash – guitar
- David J – bass guitar
- Kevin Haskins – drums
