= The Singles 1981–1983 =

Greatest hits album by Bauhaus
- Released: October 1983
- Genre: Post-punk, gothic rock
- Label: Beggars Banquet
- Producer: Bauhaus, Hugh Jones, John Sparrow

Bauhaus compilation chronology
The Singles 1981–1983 (1983)	1979–1983 (1985)

Professional ratings
Review scores
Source	Rating
AllMusic	1.5/5 stars

The Singles 1981–1983 is a greatest hits mini-album by English post-punk band Bauhaus. It was released in 1983 by record label Beggars Banquet.

== Content ==
The version of "Ziggy Stardust" included on the EP is taken from the live session recorded for the BBC Radio 1 David Jensen Show which was first broadcast on 22 July 1982.

== Track listing ==
All tracks are written by Bauhaus (Daniel Ash, Kevin Haskins, David J and Peter Murphy), except "Ziggy Stardust", written by David Bowie

Side A
No.	Title	Length
1.	"The Passion of Lovers"	3:48
2.	"Kick in the Eye"	3:29
3.	"Spirit"	3:31

Side B
No.	Title	Length
1.	"Ziggy Stardust"	3:07
2.	"Lagartija Nick"	3:02
3.	"She's in Parties"	3:43

== Personnel ==
Bauhaus

- Daniel Ash – guitar, backing vocals, production
- David J – bass guitar, backing vocals, production
- Kevin Haskins – drums, percussion
- Peter Murphy – lead vocals, production

Technical

- Hugh Jones – production on "Spirit"
- John Sparrow – production on "Ziggy Stardust"
- Derek Tomkins – engineering on "Lagartija Nick" and "She's in Parties"
