= Swing the Heartache: The BBC Sessions =

Compilation album by Bauhaus
- Released: 10 July 1989
- Recorded: 3 January 1980 – 17 February 1983
- Length: 68:30
- Label: Beggars Banquet/Ada

Bauhaus compilations chronology
1979–1983 (1985)	Swing the Heartache: The BBC Sessions (1989)	Crackle (1998)

Professional ratings
Review scores
Source	Rating
AllMusic	3/5 stars
Hi-Fi News & Record Review	A:1/1*

Swing the Heartache: The BBC Sessions is a compilation album by the English gothic rock band Bauhaus, released in 1989 by Beggars Banquet Records.

== Track listing ==
1. "A God in an Alcove" (4:08) – broadcast 3 Jan 1980 for John Peel
2. "Telegram Sam" (2:25) – broadcast 3 Jan 1980 for John Peel
3. "Double Dare" (4:55) – broadcast 3 Jan 1980 for John Peel
4. "The Spy in the Cab" (4:09) – broadcast 3 Jan 1980 for John Peel
5. "In the Flat Field" (3:46) – recorded for David Jensen
6. "St. Vitus Dance" (2:28) – recorded for David Jensen
7. "In Fear of Fear" (2:46) – recorded for David Jensen
8. "Poison Pen" (3:40) – recorded for David Jensen
9. "Party of the First Part" (5:35) – broadcast 12 April 1982 by John Peel
10. "Departure" (4:53) – broadcast 12 April 1982 by John Peel
11. "The Three Shadows Part II" (2:58) – broadcast 12 April 1982 by John Peel
12. "Silent Hedges" (3:07) – broadcast 1 July 1982 by David Jensen
13. "Swing the Heartache" (5:12) – broadcast 1 July 1982 by David Jensen
14. "Third Uncle" (5:17) – broadcast 1 July 1982 by David Jensen
15. "Ziggy Stardust" (3:12) – broadcast 1 July 1982 by David Jensen
16. "Terror Couple Kill Colonel" (3:31) – recorded 17 February 1983 for David Jensen
17. "Night Time" (3:11) – recorded 17 February 1983 for David Jensen
18. "She's in Parties" (4:41) – recorded 17 February 1983 for David Jensen
