= The Bela Session =

EP by Bauhaus (band)

EP by Bauhaus
- Released: 23 November 2018
- Recorded: 26 January 1979
- Studios: Beck Studios, Wellingborough
- Genres: Post-punk; gothic rock; dub reggae
- Length: 20:41
- Label: Leaving

The Bela Session is an extended play (EP) by the English post-punk band Bauhaus. Released on November 23, 2018, by Leaving Records in advance of the 40th anniversary of the band's formation, the EP features five songs recorded by the group during their first recording session, which took place on 26 January 1979. The tracklist consists of the original version of group's debut single, "Bela Lugosi's Dead", as well as "Harry" (originally released in 1982 as a B-side to "Kick in the Eye"), and three previously unreleased tracks: "Some Faces", "Bite My Hip" and "Boys (Original Version)". "Bite My Hip" has been reworked, re-recorded, and released as "Lagartija Nick" in 1983.

== Reception ==
Philip Sherburne of Pitchfork gave The Bela Session a score of 7.9 out of 10, praising "Bela Lugosi's Dead" as a unique song, and a "more vivid" improvement compared to the version of the song featured on Bauhaus' 1982 live album Press the Eject and Give Me the Tape. Sherburne was less complimentary towards the other tracks on the EP, referring to "Harry" as "largely a curio" and writing that "'Some Faces' might as well be the work of a pub-rock band"; he summarised: "While it's nice to have these songs available, they serve largely as reminders of how far Bauhaus soon traveled from their origins—and how distinct 'Bela Lugosi's Dead' still sounds."

== Track listing ==
No.	Title	Length
1.	"Bela Lugosi's Dead" (Official Version)	9:36
2.	"Some Faces"	2:22
3.	"Bite My Hip"	2:51
4.	"Harry"	2:46
5.	"Boys" (Original Version)	3:03
Total length:		20:41
