= 4AD (EP) =

EP (Compilation EP) by Bauhaus
- Released: October 1983
- Label: 4AD
- Producer: Bauhaus

Bauhaus chronology
Kick in the Eye EP (1982)	4AD (1983)	The Singles 1981–1983 (1983)

Professional ratings
Review scores
Source	Rating
AllMusic	2.5/5 stars

4AD is a compilation EP released by the British band Bauhaus. It was released in October 1983 by 4AD and comprises three singles and three B-sides from those singles.

== Track listing ==
All tracks are written by Bauhaus, except where noted

12" (BAD 312)
No.	Title	Length
1.	"Dark Entries"	3:51
2.	"Terror Couple Kill Colonel"	4:22
3.	"Telegram Sam" (Marc Bolan)	2:08
4.	"Terror Couple Kill Colonel (Version)"	4:33
5.	"Rosegarden Funeral of Sores" (John Cale)	5:31
6.	"Crowds"	3:13

== Personnel ==
- David J – bass, backing vocals, cover design
- Kevin Haskins – drums, percussion
- Daniel Ash – guitar, backing vocals
- Peter Murphy – lead vocals
- Bauhaus – producer
- Emmanuel Sougez – photographer (front cover)
- Stella Watts – photographer (back cover)
