= Paul Bloomquist =

United States Army officer (1932–1972)

Paul A. Bloomquist
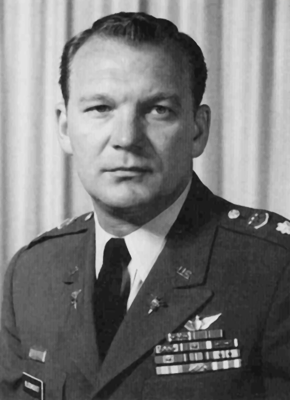
- Bloomquist in 1966
- Born: 30 October 1932; American Fork, Utah, United States
- Died: 11 May 1972 (aged 39); Frankfurt, West Germany
- Military career
- Allegiance: United States of America
- Branch: US Army
- Rank: Lieutenant colonel
- Awards: Purple Heart; Air Medal; Distinguished Flying Cross

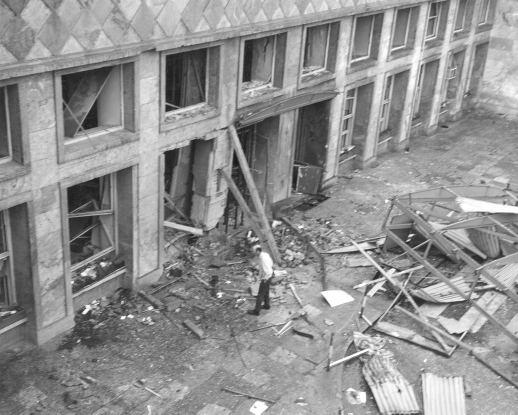
The aftermath of the Red Army Faction bombing at the IG Farben Building where Bloomquist was killed.

Paul A. Bloomquist (30 October 1932 – 11 May 1972) was an American pilot and officer of the United States Army, who was the first American killed by the Red Army Faction. A veteran of the Vietnam War stationed in West Germany, Bloomquist died in a bombing attack at the IG Farben Building on 11 May 1972.

== Biography ==
Paul A. Bloomquist was born on October 30, 1932, in American Fork, Utah. He attended West High School and the University of Utah, before joining the United States Army in 1951. He served extensively with the Army during the Vietnam War, from 1964 to 1965 with the 57th Medical Detachment (Helicopter Ambulance), and from 1968 to 1969 in the 498th Medical Company (Air Ambulance). Bloomquist received the Purple Heart three times, the Air Medal 37 times, the Distinguished Flying Cross four times, and was the 1964 "Army Aviator of the Year". After his time in Vietnam, he was appointed commander of a battalion stationed in Frankfurt, West Germany, and by 1971 was a major serving as the commanding officer of the 45th Medical Battalion 3d Armored Division based in Hanau. Later that year he was promoted to lieutenant colonel, and was on assignment to the V Corps working on a drug rehabilitation program for troops.

== Death ==
On 11 May 1972, Bloomquist was killed by a bombing attack on the headquarters of the V Corps in the IG Farben Building in Frankfurt. The attack was committed by the Red Army Faction, a West German far-left militant organization that targeted US military facilities and personnel in West Germany. The bombing was one of the Red Army Faction's first attacks, and was one of a series of bombings as part of the "May Offensive", and operation in retaliation for the United States' re-escalation of the Vietnam War.

== Posthumous awards ==
Bloomquist was inducted into the DUSTOFF Association Hall of Fame, which honors Army Medical personnel engaged in Army aeromedical evacuation programs. The Dustoff Hall of Fame states the following: "LTC Paul A. Bloomquist exemplified the DUSTOFF spirit throughout his career. Spending nearly 35 months in Vietnam, he earned 4 awards of the Distinguished Flying Cross, 37 Air Medals, and 3 Purple Hearts. One DFC citation reports that even though he was wounded himself, he continued flying for nearly 13 hours during which time he rescued many casualties under heavy enemy fire. He was selected "Army Aviator of the Year" in 1964 and the U.S. Chamber of Commerce honored him as an "Outstanding Young American." Following a battalion command in Germany, his life was cut short when a terrorist group exploded several bombs at the V Corps Headquarters in Frankfurt. In recognition of his service, the US Army installation at Ziegenberg, Germany, home of the 68th Medical Group, was renamed "Camp Paul Bloomquist." Paul Bloomquist was inducted into the DUSTOFF Hall of Fame on 22 February 2003."

Bloomquist was also inducted into the Utah Aviation Hall of Fame, which is located at the Hill Aerospace Museum at Hill AFB, in 2010.

The barrack of the 68th Medical Group was named Camp Paul Bloomquist in his honor.

== Popular culture ==
The song "Terror Couple Kill Colonel" by Bauhaus refers to the murder of Paul Bloomquist.
