= Live in the Studio 1979 =

Live album by Bauhaus
- Released: 1997
- Recorded: 1979
- Studio: London, England
- Label: Nemo

Bauhaus live albums chronology
Rest in Peace: The Final Concert (1992)	Live in the Studio 1979 (1997)	Gotham (1999)

Live in the Studio 1979 is a live album by English gothic rock band Bauhaus. It was released in 1997 by record label Nemo, included with the Andrew Brooksbank book Bauhaus: Beneath the Mask.

== Background and critical reception ==
Months after its formation, the band then known as Bauhaus 1919 inadvertently recorded eight tracks that would make up Live in the Studio 1979. Predating their debut studio album, the songs during this 25-minute rehearsal were performed live in one take with no overdubs, after the band had finished their official recording duties. The recording of this session was distributed in 1997 by Nemo Records (Beggars Banquet), included with the Andrew Brooksbank book Bauhaus: Beneath The Mask. Since 2010, it has been available through the Beggars Archive website.

Author Dave Thompson called the recording "raw, rough, and blistered by the shattered promise of punk's sordid dream, it captures Bauhaus before anything else got its claws in them." Thompson described the track "Honeymoon Croon" as "a psychotic 'My Sharona'". Tom Schulte of AllMusic said the album "is a fascinating document exhibiting the forbidding goth birth from the body of its parent and antipode." Schulte remarked that it featured the group's "hallmark sound: attenuated pop guitar lines played low and hauntingly to frame Peter Murphy's dungeon vocals."

== Track listing ==
No.	Title	Length
1.	"In the Night"	3:14
2.	"A God in an Alcove"	3:32
3.	"Dark Entries"	3:36
4.	"Telegram Sam" (T. Rex cover)	2:29
5.	"Nerves"	5:27
6.	"Honeymoon Croon"	3:10
7.	"Kamikazi Dive"	2:49
8.	"Shows (Fragment)"	1:18
