= Soul Merchants =

American deathrock band

- Origin: Denver, Colorado, U.S.
- Genres: Deathrock, gothic rock
- Years active: 1985–1987
- Labels: Smooch, Iron Gate
- Past members: Malcom Black; Michael Moore; Paul Ciciora; Robert Ferbrache; Jerry Cuba

Soul Merchants were an American deathrock band formed in March 1985 in Denver, Colorado by vocalist Malcolm Black and guitarist Michael Moore. They are regarded as Denver's first goth rock band. Their sound were compared to other goth rock groups such as the Sisters of Mercy and Joy Division. In fact, they have been regarded as the Denver's version of the Sisters of Mercy. The band incorporated genres such as Goth Rock (like their influences such as the Sisters of Mercy and Bauhaus), Psychedelia, Punk rock and Glam rock. The group described their music as "Psychedelic Death Rock". They were noted for their live shows for performing a different cover song (with one exception) in every live show they made. They have performed a cover of Iron Butterfly's In-A-Gadda-Da-Vida in one of their live shows. The group had disbanded in March 1987.

A complication album titled, 1985-1987, was released by Smooch Records, 20 years after their disbandment to preserve their legacy.

== Discography ==
Studio albums

- God's Hand Touched Him, And He Slept (1985, Iron Gate)
- Before The Gates (1987, Iron Gate)

LPs

- Gates Of Heaven (1986, Iron Gate)

Compilation albums

- 1985-1987 (2007, Smooch)
