= Go Away White =

Studio album by Bauhaus
- Released: 3 March 2008
- Recorded: 2006
- Studios: Zircon Skye, Ojai, California, United States
- Genres: Gothic rock; funk rock; post-punk
- Length: 48:54
- Labels: Cooking Vinyl; Bauhaus Music
- Producer: Bauhaus

Bauhaus chronology
| Burning from the Inside (1983) | Go Away White (2008) |

Go Away White is the fifth and final studio album by English gothic rock band Bauhaus, and was internationally released on 3 March 2008 by record labels Cooking Vinyl in the UK and Bauhaus Music. It was the band's first album of new material since Burning from the Inside in 1983.

Shortly after the release, the band announced this would be their final record and the end of the band, and that there would be no tour to support the album. However, the band did play the song "Adrenalin" on some dates of their 2022 tour.

== Recording ==
Go Away White was recorded in 2006 in 18 days at Zircon Skye in Ojai, California. The band played together in one room, taking first takes as final cuts. Drummer Kevin Haskins said in an interview that they "were getting along really well, but there was an incident that occurred". As a result, "some of us just felt that we didn't want to carry on as a working unit". No details on the incident were given.

Bassist David J later described the incident as "a big fight in the studio. We weren't going to carry on, and we were just going to dump the album. We were waiting for Peter [Murphy] to turn up. Our beef was with him. So he comes in, and he does this shocking and brilliant thing. Pure zen. He comes in, and he just spits rose petals in our faces. It just cut through everything. We couldn't argue with that. So we just went in and continued recording."

Peter Murphy described the album as "spontaneous", and while it doesn't sound much like what they did in the past, it has some "positives" and "playfulness" to it.

== Cover art ==
The front cover is a photo by Dominique Duplaa of the Bethesda Terrace, called "Bethesda, Angel of the Healing Waters".

== Critical reception ==
Professional ratings
Aggregate scores
| Source | Rating |
|---|---|
| Metacritic | 68/100 |
Review scores
| Source | Rating |
| AllMusic | 4/5 stars |
| Drowned in Sound | 6/10 |
| Entertainment Weekly | C+ |
| Filter | 4/5 stars |
| Mojo | 3/5 stars |
| Pitchfork | 7.5/10 |
| Q | 2/5 stars |
| Rolling Stone | 3/5 stars |
| Spin | 7/10 |
| Uncut | 3/5 stars |

Ned Raggett of AllMusic wrote, "perhaps the best and most surprising thing about Go Away White is that it doesn't resemble Burning from the Inside or any other Bauhaus album – rather than trying to recapture the past, the four members sought to meet in the middle where they had ended up, at least in part". D. Shawn Bosler of Pitchfork called it an "impressive and surprisingly true-to-form swan song". Jason Heller of The A.V. Club wrote, "While many cult bands can't make a dignified comeback to save their lives, the raw, slithering, true-to-its-roots Go Away White is more than a swansong. It's a minor masterpiece that proves Bauhaus has been nicely preserved."

On the other hand, Drowned in Sound wrote, "There's indisputable evidence that the sonic territory they forged was vital at the time and has remained influential, but in the year 2007 we have gatekeepers to dramatic, fearless rock twice as vital. Nick Cave, for one, cannot be killed... Bauhaus are a stone mausoleum by comparison, standing stately, but of another time." Under the Radar wrote, "It's disappointing that this epilogue couldn't have been crafted with more care."

Barry Walters of Spin observed, "Bauhaus may have godfathered goth at the end of the 1970s, but their combustive early dance singles like “Kick in the Eye” could give most current disco-rock trendies a smackdown. For their first studio disc in 25 years, the English quartet flit from riff-fueled social criticism to anguished balladry, often sounding more like a cross between singer Peter Murphy’s brooding solo efforts and splinter group Love and Rockets’ buzzing groove rock than the dubbed-up glampunk band that birthed both. Yet even a tastefully matured Bauhaus produce enough fractured guitar and howling melodrama to wake the undead."

== Track listing ==
All tracks are written by Bauhaus (Daniel Ash, David J, Kevin Haskins and Peter Murphy).

| No. | Title | Length |
|---|---|---|
| 1. | "Too Much 21st Century" | 3:53 |
| 2. | "Adrenalin" | 5:39 |
| 3. | "Undone" | 4:46 |
| 4. | "International Bulletproof Talent" | 4:02 |
| 5. | "Endless Summer of the Damned" | 4:44 |
| 6. | "Saved" | 6:27 |
| 7. | "Mirror Remains" | 4:58 |
| 8. | "Black Stone Heart" | 4:32 |
| 9. | "The Dog's a Vapour" | 6:49 |
| 10. | "Zikir" | 3:04 |

iTunes bonus live concert footage tracks
| No. | Title | Length |
|---|---|---|
| 1. | "Bela Lugosi's Dead" (from Coachella Festival 2005) |
| 2. | "Dark Entries" (from Coachella Festival 2005) |

== Personnel ==
- Peter Murphy – vocals
- Daniel Ash – guitars
- David J – bass
- Kevin Haskins – drums
- Ken Eros – engineer (recording, mixing)
- Jeff Evans – engineer (recording, mixing)
- Doug Sax – engineer (mastering)

== Charts ==
Weekly chart performance for Go Away White
| Chart (2008) | Peak position |
|---|---|
| French Albums (SNEP) | 183 |
| UK Albums (Official Charts) | 120 |
| UK Independent Albums | 13 |
| US Billboard 200 | 105 |
