= Third Uncle =

1974 song by Brian Eno

Song by Brian Eno

from the album Taking Tiger Mountain (By Strategy)
- Released: November 1974
- Recorded: September 1974
- Studio: Basing Street Studios, London
- Genre: Art rock; proto-punk
- Length: 4:48
- Label: Island Records
- Songwriters: Brian Eno, Brian Turrington
- Producer: Brian Eno

"Third Uncle" is a 1974 song by the English musician Brian Eno, released on his second solo album Taking Tiger Mountain (By Strategy). The song was recorded at Basing Street Studios in Notting Hill, London, in September 1974, and produced by Eno. It has been highly influential and covered by many artists, most notably by Bauhaus in 1982.

The song is based around a bass guitar riff by Brian Turrington, which borrows from Pink Floyd's "One of These Days" in its use of delay. Behind this are two rhythm guitar parts, one by Eno and one by his former Roxy Music bandmate Phil Manzanera, each playing frenetic, staccato chords. Eno's vocals are sung in a near-monotone.

Along with the title track and "Baby's On Fire" from his 1974 debut album Here Come the Warm Jets, "Third Uncle" remains one of Eno's best-known and most influential songs. A live recording featuring Eno and Manzanera appears on the supergroup 801's 1976 album 801 Live; this version has been cited as a forerunner of punk rock, and was described by AllMusic writer Dave Thomas as "furious...positive madness."

== Bauhaus cover ==
"Third Uncle"

Song by Bauhaus

from the album The Sky's Gone Out
- Released: 22 October 1982
- Recorded: 1982
- Studio: Rockfield Studios, Monmouthshire, Wales
- Genre: Post-punk; art punk; gothic rock
- Length: 5:14
- Label: Beggars Banquet
- Songwriter: Brian Eno

"Third Uncle" was covered by the English gothic rock band Bauhaus as the opening track on their 1982 album The Sky's Gone Out. In 2017, Miles Raymer of Pitchfork opined that this "somehow less sinister" cover version made historical sense in light of how Eno helped shape "goth’s sonic DNA, especially in his love for synthesizers and abstract instrumentation. His pre-ambient solo career is full of aggressive, gleefully perverse proto-goth songs."

== Personnel ==
- Brian Eno – vocals, electronics, electric guitar, keyboards
- Phil Manzanera – electric guitar
- Brian Turrington – bass guitar
- Freddie Smith – drums
- Robert Wyatt – percussion

== Sources ==
- Sheppard, David. On Some Faraway Beach: The Life and Times of Brian Eno. Chicago Review Press, 2008. ISBN 978-1-55652-942-9
