= The Sky's Gone Out =

Studio album by Bauhaus
- Released: 22 October 1982
- Recorded: 1982
- Studio: Rockfield, Monmouth; Beck, Wellingborough; BBC Maida Vale London
- Genre: Gothic rock; experimental
- Length: 42:24
- Label: Beggars Banquet
- Producer: Bauhaus

Bauhaus chronology
Mask (1981)	The Sky's Gone Out (1982)	Burning from the Inside (1983)

Singles from The Sky's Gone Out
- 1. "Spirit" Released: July 1982

The Sky's Gone Out is the third studio album by English gothic rock band Bauhaus, released in 1982 by record label Beggars Banquet.

The album's production was markedly more difficult than the band's previous records, featuring conflict between the band members and with their record label. Critical reception was also more muted than for their previous works, though the album has been more warmly reevaluated over time.

== Background ==
Bauhaus' first two albums, In the Flat Field and Mask were both successful for the band and helped to establish Gothic rock as a genre. However, during the recording of their third album, The Sky's Gone Out, the band began to experience major conflict with their record label, Beggars Banquet.

When creating the first single off their third album, the song was produced by Hugh Jones, atypical of the band who usually produced their own music, and subsequently leading to conflict. David J explained, "There was so much agonizing over it more from the producer than us."

The band then filmed a music video for the song, originally intended to show a spirit and "a single dancer with a white face mask and body paint who would come onto the stage whilst the band performed the song and literally 'lift' Peter and give him wings," as the song was about, "a 'fifth member' of the band—a spirit they [The band] felt occupied the stage, lifting them to a higher plane when they were playing well." However, the producers changed the video much to the band's displeasure, who refilmed the video using their own money. However, according to David J, "We did it. Delivered the master to Beggars Banquet. Next week—this was at the time of the video jukebox craze—we went into a pub and we see the original horrible version on the video. So we immediately rang Beggars Banquet and said; 'What's going on?' and they'd send out the wrong one and it had gone off to TV and everything."

== Recording ==
The band wanted to produce their third LP, The Sky's Gone Out, themselves, but arguments ensued in the studio among the band members over creative direction. The band members realized that they needed an objective perspective on their music, and producer Derek Tompkins was hired. Tompkins commented: "I was, however, quite willing to act as an engineer provided the resident engineer was responsible for the engineering and I was only responsible for interpreting what they wanted to him and helping a bit creatively myself."

The band were booked into Rockfield Studios in Wales for one month to record the album. Most of the album was created through experimentation and done on the spot. Although the sessions were successful, conflicts arose between the band and engineer, with Tompkins as the mediator. Although Tompkins did not understand the album's music or lyrics, he "always used to ask them what the song was about so I knew what mood I was aiming for".

== Music ==
NME said about the music: "[singer] Peter Murphy comes across like David Bowie imitating Jacques Brel declaiming a pastiche of Lautréamont backed by the early [Siouxsie and the] Banshees." The album features further experimentation from the band, with the album including ballads, disco, ska and reggae.

The lyrical content of the album was more personal, and less about the taboo and disturbing topics Bauhaus concerned themselves with in the past."All We Ever Wanted Was Everything", according to David J, "evokes nostalgic memories of a time of innocence and naive yearning.

== Release ==
The album's release was preceded by the release of their seventh single, "Spirit", which peaked at No. 42 and lasted for five weeks on the chart.

The Sky's Gone Out was released in October 1982 by the record label Beggars Banquet. It featured a cover version of Brian Eno's "Third Uncle" and a rerecording of "Spirit". The album became the band's greatest commercial success, peaking at No. 3 on the UK Album Charts.

The initial limited edition included the live album Press the Eject and Give Me the Tape as a bonus. The compact disc reissue dropped the run-out speech from the final track "Exquisite Corpse" (which, like the snoring on the song itself, was done by the band's sound engineer Derek Tompkins). The full length track (6:50) was used for the version released as part of the 5CD box set BBQCD2110. The Canadian edition of this album also contained a free 12" vinyl single featuring "Ziggy Stardust", "Kick in the Eye" and "Lagartija Nick". This version did not have the distinctive artwork from the US and UK editions but was presented as a white field with the album title and band logo in the upper right corner.

== Reception ==
Professional ratings
Review scores
Source	Rating
AllMusic	3/5 stars
Record Collector	3/5 stars

In his retrospective review of the album, Ned Raggett of AllMusic wrote, "On balance it's quite a fine album, but unlike Mask it misses the infusion of a more positive energy, and simply doesn't gel as perfectly, more notable for individual songs than as a whole."

== Legacy ==
In their feature on the album in 2001 Alternative Press described The Sky's Gone Out as one of the Top 10 essential goth albums.

== Track listing ==
All tracks are written by Bauhaus (Daniel Ash, David J, Kevin Haskins and Peter Murphy), except as noted.

No.	Title	Writer(s)	Length
1.	"Third Uncle"	Brian Eno	5:14
2.	"Silent Hedges"		3:09
3.	"In the Night"		3:05
4.	"Swing the Heartache"		5:51
5.	"Spirit"		5:28
6.	"The Three Shadows, Part I"		4:21
7.	"The Three Shadows, Part II"		3:12
8.	"The Three Shadows, Part III"		1:36
9.	"All We Ever Wanted Was Everything"		3:49
10.	"Exquisite Corpse"		5:39

CD reissue bonus tracks
No.	Title	Writer(s)	Length
11.	"Ziggy Stardust" (David Bowie cover)	Bowie	3:13
12.	"Party of the First Part"		5:27
13.	"Spirit" (single version)		3:45
14.	"Watch That Grandad Go"		5:40

== Personnel ==
Bauhaus

- Peter Murphy – vocals, additional guitar
- Daniel Ash – guitars, backing vocals on "Exquisite Corpse," album cover painting
- David J – bass, backing vocals on "Exquisite Corpse"
- Kevin Haskins – drums, congas on "Third Uncle"

== Charts ==
Chart (1982)	Peak position
New Zealand Albums (RMNZ)	26
UK Albums (Official Charts)	3

== Certifications ==
Certifications for The Sky's Gone Out
Region	Certification	Certified units/sales
United Kingdom (BPI)	Silver	60,000^{^}
^{*} Sales figures based on certification alone.

== Sources ==
- Shirley, Ian (1994). Dark Entries: Bauhaus and Beyond. SAF. ISBN 0-946719-136.
