= In the Flat Field =

Studio album by Bauhaus
- Released: 7 November 1980
- Recorded: December 1979 – July 1980
- Studios: BBC Maida Vale and Southern, London
- Genres: Post-punk; gothic rock
- Length: 37:44
- Label: 4AD
- Producer: Bauhaus

Bauhaus chronology
| In the Flat Field (1980) | Mask (1981) |

In the Flat Field is the debut studio album by the English gothic rock band Bauhaus. It was recorded between December 1979 and July 1980, and released on 7 November 1980 by record label 4AD, the first full-length release on that label. The cover artwork is a reproduction of Duane Michals' 1949 photograph, Homage to Puvis de Chavannes.

The band recorded the album after releasing their first three singles, "Bela Lugosi's Dead", "Dark Entries", and "Terror Couple Kill Colonel", conceiving the record with influences from post-punk bands such as Siouxsie and the Banshees and glam rock figures such as David Bowie.

In the Flat Field initially received polarized reviews. Over time, however, its standing has improved, and it is now highly regarded as one of the first and most influential gothic rock albums.

== Background ==
Bauhaus initially saw success with their debut single "Bela Lugosi's Dead", widely regarded as a pioneering gothic rock record. However, the band chose to leave their label, Small Wonder Records, citing a lack of support from the label. Signing with the 4AD label, Bauhaus released two more singles, "Dark Entries" in January 1980 and "Terror Couple Kill Colonel" in June 1980.

== Recording ==
Following a 30-date tour, Bauhaus went to Southern Studios in Wood Green, London, to record their first album. The band had a clear conception of how they wanted the record to sound, and so they opted to produce it themselves. While most of the album was completed in time for the planned release date of September 1980, the group found it difficult to record a version of "Double Dare" as good as the one they had performed on DJ John Peel's BBC Radio 1 programme. The band applied to the BBC for permission to use the Peel session version on the album, but due to obstruction from the Musicians' Union, the process took over a month.

== Music ==
NME's Andy Gill wrote that the dark atmosphere of the record was reminiscent of contemporaries such as Siouxsie and the Banshees, Adam and the Ants, and Joy Division. In his AllMusic review, critic Ned Raggett described Bauhaus as a "glam-inspired rock band" comparing vocalist Peter Murphy to Iggy Pop and David Bowie and guitarist Daniel Ash's performance to that of Bowie sideman Mick Ronson. Raggett noted that the album concluded with "a dramatic ending" with the song "Nerves".

The album's lyrics feature many taboo subjects such as martyrdom, paranoia, madness, obsession and prostitution. "Stigmata Martyr", for instance, is about "a person whose religious obsession with Christ takes the form of a physical manifestation of the crucifixion; i.e. nail marks on the hands: 'In a crucifixion, ecstacy, Lying cross checked in agony, Stigmata bleed continuously, Holes in head, hands, feet, and weep for me.' When delivering these lyrics Peter became the stigmata." Another song, "Dark Entries", tells the story of title character Dorian Gray from Oscar Wilde's novel The Picture of Dorian Gray, which is Murphy's favorite novel. Murphy explains: "It was the first book with real substance that I chose for myself. It's a story of great narcissism and esoteric interior, and brilliantly written. It's a window into this personality, this Oscar Wilde chap I'd heard about. The language is so opulent. It's a rock star's story, really." The track "In the Flat Field" was inspired by "the quotidian mundaneness of life in Northampton, and the desire to escape that 'flat' existence."

== Release ==
In the Flat Field was released on 7 November 1980 by record label 4AD. It was met with a negative response from professional critics in the UK, but topped the UK Independent Albums Chart and made the UK Albums Chart for one week at No. 72.

The album was first released on CD by 4AD in April 1988 with eight bonus tracks, including three non-album singles: "Dark Entries", "Terror Couple Kill Colonel", and a cover of T. Rex's "Telegram Sam". Five of these bonus tracks had been previously compiled on the 4AD EP in 1983.

On 19 October 2009, 4AD and Beggars Banquet reissued the album as an "Omnibus Edition", featuring a 24-bit John Dent remaster of the original nine-track album on CD in a replica mini-LP sleeve (with corresponding inner sleeve featuring the lyrics), plus a 16-track bonus disc of singles, outtakes, alternate recordings, and original versions. The set came inside a semi-long box, coupled with a 48-page book that included comments from band members, photos, complete lyrics, complete tour date information for 1979 and 1980, and an essay by Andrew Brooksbank on the formation and creation of the band, the singles, and the album.

== Critical reception ==
Professional ratings
Review scores
| Source | Rating |
|---|---|
| AllMusic | 4/5 stars |
| Classic Rock | 8/10 |
| Drowned in Sound | 9/10 |
| Pitchfork | 9.2/10 |
| Record Collector | 5/5 stars |

While In the Flat Field received positive reviews in fanzine publications, the album was "absolutely slated" by the British weekly music press according to Bauhaus biographer Ian Shirley. Andy Gill of NME described the album as "nine meaningless moans and flails bereft of even the most cursory contour of interest, a record which deserves all the damning adjectives usually levelled at grim-faced 'modernists,'" ultimately dismissing them as "a hip Black Sabbath". Dave McCullough of Sounds was also negative: "No songs. Just tracks (ugh). Too priggish and conceited. Sluggish indulgence instead of hoped for goth-ness. Coldly catatonic."

The American Trouser Press, however, described it as "a dense, disjointed patchwork of sounds and uncertain feelings, supported by a pressured, incessant beat. Delving deep into the dark side of the human psyche, Bauhaus conjures up unsettling images of a world given over to death and decay."

In his AllMusic retrospective review, Ned Raggett praised the album, writing that "few debut albums ever arrived so nearly perfectly formed". while Treble's Jeff Terich described the songs as "twisted, glam-inspired post-punk raveups". Jonathan Selzer of Classic Rock magazine described the album as "remarkably self-possessed, a distillation of influences down to a potent curtains-drawn universe of Bauhaus's own."

== Legacy ==
AllMusic's Raggett wrote: "In the Flat Field practically single-handedly invented what remains for many as the stereotype of goth music—wracked, at times spindly vocals about despair and desolation of many kinds, sung over mysterious and moody music". In 2012, Sonic Seducer ranked In the Flat Field at No. 4 on its list of "10 Key Albums for the Gothic Scene", calling it a work that had shattered outdated ideas of rock music. Music author Dave Thompson described it as "one of the most courageous albums of the age." Writing for Louder Than War, John Robb noted it as "a staple record for the true post-punk scene". American musician and audio engineer Steve Albini called the album a "masterpiece" in a 2020 interview.

In the Flat Field was listed in Tom Moon's 2008 book 1,000 Recordings to Hear Before You Die.

In 2020, Rolling Stone included the album at No. 61 on its list of "The 80 Greatest Albums of 1980".

== Track listing ==
All tracks are written by Bauhaus (Peter Murphy, Daniel Ash, David J, Kevin Haskins), except as noted.

Side A
| No. | Title | Length |
|---|---|---|
| 1. | "Double Dare" | 4:54 |
| 2. | "In the Flat Field" | 4:00 |
| 3. | "A God in an Alcove" | 4:08 |
| 4. | "Dive" | 2:13 |
| 5. | "Spy in the Cab" | 4:31 |

Side B
| No. | Title | Length |
|---|---|---|
| 6. | "Small Talk Stinks" | 3:35 |
| 7. | "St. Vitus Dance" | 3:31 |
| 8. | "Stigmata Martyr" | 3:46 |
| 9. | "Nerves" | 7:06 |

1988 CD reissue version
| No. | Title | Writer(s) | Length |
|---|---|---|---|
| 1. | "Dark Entries" (single version) | | 3:52 |
| 2. | "Double Dare" | | 4:54 |
| 3. | "In the Flat Field" | | 5:00 |
| 4. | "A God in an Alcove" | | 4:08 |
| 5. | "Dive" | | 2:13 |
| 6. | "Spy in the Cab" | | 4:31 |
| 7. | "Small Talk Stinks" | | 3:35 |
| 8. | "St. Vitus Dance" | | 3:31 |
| 9. | "Stigmata Martyr" | | 3:46 |
| 10. | "Nerves" | | 7:06 |
| 11. | "Telegram Sam" (single version) | Marc Bolan | 2:11 |
| 12. | "Rosegarden Funeral of Sores" | John Cale | 5:34 |
| 13. | "Terror Couple Kill Colonel" (single version) | | 4:21 |
| 14. | "Scopes" | | 1:34 |
| 15. | "Untitled" | | 1:27 |
| 16. | "God in an Alcove" | | 4:09 |
| 17. | "Crowds" | | 3:15 |

Omnibus Edition bonus disc
| No. | Title | Writer(s) | Length |
|---|---|---|---|
| 1. | "Dark Entries" (single A-side – AD 3[A]) | | 3:52 |
| 2. | "A God in an Alcove" (original version) | | 4:09 |
| 3. | "Untitled" (single B-side – AD 3[B]) | | 1:28 |
| 4. | "Terror Couple Kill Colonel" (original Beck version) | | 4:45 |
| 5. | "Telegram Sam" (original Beck version) | Bolan | 2:19 |
| 6. | "Terror Couple Kill Colonel" (single B-side – AD 7[B]) | | 4:34 |
| 7. | "Scopes" (single B-side – AD 7[B]) | | 1:34 |
| 8. | "Terror Couple Kill Colonel" (Southern mix #2) | | 4:26 |
| 9. | "Crowds" (single B-side – AD 17T[B]) | | 3:16 |
| 10. | "Dive" (out-take / alternative mix) | | 2:15 |
| 11. | "Spy in the Cab" (out-take / alternative mix) | | 4:31 |
| 12. | "Stigmata Martyr" (out-take / alternative mix) | | 3:45 |
| 13. | "Rosegarden Funeral of Sores" (single B-side – AD 17T[B]) | Cale | 5:32 |
| 14. | "Double Dare" (alternative version / mix #4) | | 5:34 |
| 15. | "Telegram Sam" (alternative mix #1) | Bolan | 2:24 |
| 16. | "Untitled 2" | | 1:11 |

Note: In Canada, "Telegram Sam" was included as track 2 on side B.

== Personnel ==
Credits are sourced from the liner notes of the original release.

- Bauhaus – production, instruments, lyrics, arrangements, sleeve design
- Tony Cook – engineering
- Glenn Campling – sleeve design
- Stella Watts – photography
- Geoff Smith – photography
- Piers Bannister – photography
- Eugene Merinov – photography
- Duane Michals – Front cover photograph "Homage to Puvis de Chavannes", credited to Artists Postcards 1978. N.Y.C. (Series II)

== Charts ==
Chart performances for In the Flat Field
| Chart (1980) | Peak position |
|---|---|
| UK Albums (Official Charts) | 72 |
| UK Independent Albums | 1 |

== Sources ==
- Brooksbank, Andrew J. (1997). Bauhaus: Beneath the Mask. Nemo.
- Reynolds, Simon (2005). Rip It Up and Start Again: Postpunk 1978–1984. Penguin. ISBN 0-14-303672-6.
- Shirley, Ian (1994). Dark Entries: Bauhaus and Beyond. SAF. ISBN 0-946719-136.
