= Press the Eject and Give Me the Tape =

Live album by Bauhaus
- Released: 1982
- Recorded: 31 October 1981; 9 November 1981; 24 February 1982
- Studio: Old Vic, London; Royal Court Theatre, Liverpool; Hammersmith Palais, London, England
- Length: 48:22
- Label: Beggars Banquet

Bauhaus live albums chronology
Press the Eject and Give Me the Tape (1982)	Rest in Peace: The Final Concert (1992)

Professional ratings
Review scores
Source	Rating
AllMusic	2.5/5 stars

Press the Eject and Give Me the Tape is a live album by the British gothic rock band Bauhaus, released in 1982 on Beggars Banquet Records, and recorded in London and Liverpool in 1981 and 1982.

== Content ==
The album cover is a photograph by Eugene Merinov.

== Release ==
The album was originally a bonus disc with the initial limited edition of the 1982 studio album The Sky's Gone Out. Later in the year it was released as a separate album, with initial copies receiving a free single and poster pack. The "Satori in Paris" single features live versions of "Double Dare" and "Hair of the Dog" not recorded at the same gigs from the album, the poster being a montage of the band's history on stage and beyond.

The album was reissued in 1988 with six bonus tracks, including the previously unissued "Of Lillies and Remains" and a cover of the Velvet Underground's "Waiting for the Man" recorded live at Fagins, Manchester, 22 October 1981, featuring Nico on vocals (this track was also a track on the "Ziggy Stardust" single). The version of "Terror Couple Kill Colonel" had previously been released on the b-side of the "Spirit" 7" single.

== Track listing ==
All tracks are written by Bauhaus unless otherwise noted.

Side one
No.	Title	Recorded	Length
1.	"In the Flat Field"	24 February 1982 at The Old Vic, London	4:27
2.	"Rosegarden Funeral of Sores" (John Cale)	24 February 1982 at The Old Vic, London	5:14
3.	"Dancing"	31 October 1981 at The Royal Court Theatre, Liverpool	2:33
4.	"The Man With X-Ray Eyes"	9 November 1981 at Hammersmith Palais, London	3:41
5.	"Bela Lugosi's Dead"	24 February 1982 at The Old Vic, London	9:35

Side two
No.	Title	Recorded	Length
6.	"The Spy in the Cab"	31 October 1981 at The Royal Court Theatre, Liverpool	4:06
7.	"Kick in the Eye"	31 October 1981 at The Royal Court Theatre, Liverpool	3:38
8.	"In Fear of Fear"	31 October 1981 at The Royal Court Theatre, Liverpool	2:52
9.	"Hollow Hills"	24 February 1982 at The Old Vic, London	4:12
10.	"Stigmata Martyr"	31 October 1981 at The Royal Court Theatre, Liverpool	3:35
11.	"Dark Entries"	31 October 1981 at The Royal Court Theatre, Liverpool	4:29

Re-release bonus tracks
No.	Title	Recorded	Length
12.	"Terror Couple Kill Colonel"	3 December 1981 at Le Rose Bon Bon, Paris	3:41
13.	"Double Dare"	3 December 1981 at Le Rose Bon Bon, Paris	5:48
14.	"In the Flat Field"	3 December 1981 at Le Rose Bon Bon, Paris	4:14
15.	"Hair of the Dog"	3 December 1981 at Le Rose Bon Bon, Paris	2:48
16.	"Of Lillies and Remains"	3 December 1981 at Le Rose Bon Bon, Paris	3:28
17.	"Waiting for the Man" (Lou Reed; featuring Nico on vocals)	28 October 1981 at Fagins, Manchester	4:48

== "Satori in Paris" ==
The "Satori in Paris" single was a free insert in the first UK press release of the Press the Eject and Give Me the Tape LP, and on the New Rose label in France. Both tracks are live versions recorded at Le Rose Bon Bon, Paris, France on 3 December 1981. Both tracks are included as bonus tracks on CD reissues of the LP.

=== Track listing ===
1. "Double Dare"
2. "Hair of the Dog"
