= Gotham (album) =

Live album by Bauhaus
- Released: November 1999
- Recorded: 28 August & 9–10 September 1998
- Studio: Hammerstein Ballroom, New York City; Chicago Recording, Chicago, United States
- Length: 98:04
- Label: Metropolis

Bauhaus live albums chronology
Live in the Studio 1979 (1997)	Gotham (1999)

Professional ratings
Review scores
Source	Rating
AllMusic	4.5/5 stars

Gotham is a double-disc live album by English gothic rock band Bauhaus of a concert performed in 1998, released in 1999 by record label Metropolis. The album also includes one appended studio track, a cover of "Severance", originally recorded by Dead Can Dance on their 1988 album The Serpent's Egg.

== Track listing ==
Disc one
No.	Title	Length
1.	"Double Dare"	6:20
2.	"In the Flat Field"	4:08
3.	"A God in an Alcove"	4:25
4.	"In Fear of Fear"	3:35
5.	"Hollow Hills"	6:29
6.	"Kick in the Eye"	3:48
7.	"Terror Couple Kill Colonel"	3:58
8.	"Silent Hedges"	3:49
9.	"Severance" (Dead Can Dance cover)	7:23
10.	"Boys"	4:04
11.	"She's in Parties"	5:54
12.	"The Passion of Lovers"	3:36
13.	"Dark Entries"	3:56

Disc two
No.	Title	Length
1.	"Telegram Sam" (T. Rex cover)	2:23
2.	"Ziggy Stardust" (David Bowie cover)	3:25
3.	"Bela Lugosi's Dead"	13:31
4.	"All We Ever Wanted"	4:38
5.	"Spirit"	5:22
6.	"Severance (Studio Version)" (Dead Can Dance cover)	7:20

== Personnel ==
- Peter Murphy – vocals, guitar
- Daniel Ash – guitar
- David J – bass guitar
- Kevin Haskins – drums
