= Mask (Bauhaus album) =

Studio album by Bauhaus
- Released: 16 October 1981
- Recorded: 1981
- Studios: Playground and Jam, London
- Genres: Post-punk, gothic rock, experimental
- Length: 34:19
- Label: Beggars Banquet
- Producer: Bauhaus

Bauhaus chronology
In the Flat Field (1980)	Mask (1981)	The Sky's Gone Out (1982)

Singles from Mask
- 1. "Kick in the Eye" Released: 20 March 1981; 2. "The Passion of Lovers" Released: 19 June 1981

Mask is the second studio album by English gothic rock band Bauhaus. It was released on 16 October 1981 by record label Beggars Banquet, their first album on the label. The album features experimentation from the band, incorporating keyboards and acoustic guitar, for instance.

The album received positive reviews from critics, acclaimed by many as an improvement over their debut, In the Flat Field. It is included in the book 1001 Albums You Must Hear Before You Die.

== Background ==
After the success of the band's first album, In the Flat Field and the resulting tour, the band left their record label, 4AD, due to the label's resources being unable to keep up with their growing success. The band released two singles on their new record, "Kick in the Eye" and "The Passion of Lovers". "Kick in the Eye" charted at No. 29 on the US Club Play Singles chart, while "The Passion of Lovers" peaked at No. 56 in the UK Singles Chart.

== Content ==
Bauhaus expanded their style a bit on Mask, particularly by incorporating keyboards and acoustic guitar on songs such as "The Passion of Lovers", and funk rhythms and saxophone on tracks like "Kick in the Eye", "Dancing" and "In Fear of Fear". Murphy said, "One of our loves is to make each single totally different from the last, not to be tied down by a style or sound."

The album cover is a drawing by guitarist Daniel Ash. The original artwork for the album was a gatefold sleeve with blue text on the inside and a stark black-and-white image of the band. On later editions this inside was replaced with white text and a montage from the promotional video for the song "Mask".

== Release ==
Mask was released in October 1981 by record label Beggars Banquet. In addition to the singles released for the album, the group shot a video for the album's title track, filmed in a hazardous and abandoned Victorian shoe factory in Northampton.

The 19 October 2009 CD reissue, subtitled the Omnibus Edition, included a remastered version of the original album as disc 1, a second disc of B-sides and alternate versions called Singles and Out-Takes, as well as a live CD called This Is for When..., recorded at Hammersmith Palais in London on 9 November 1981.

== Reception and legacy ==
Professional ratings
Review scores
Source	Rating
AllMusic	4/5 stars
Classic Rock	8/10
Drowned in Sound	8/10
Record Collector	4/5 stars

In his retrospective review of the album, Ned Raggett of AllMusic called Mask "arguably even better than the band's almost flawless debut". Trouser Press described the album as "[Bauhaus'] finest achievement". Classic Rock reviewer Jonathan Selzer remarked how on Mask "Bauhaus managed to sound more expansive and less withdrawn, without losing any of their austere aura", gaining "a newfound accessibility that would see them break into the Top 30."

Mask was also included in the book 1001 Albums You Must Hear Before You Die. In the album's entry in the book, Australia's Fiend Magazine editor and contributing critic Alexandra Heller-Nicholas wrote that "The sounds were harder-edged than those of Bauhaus' debut, but the introduction of more pop-friendly melodies helped to make Mask digestible for a mainstream audience."

== Track listing ==
All tracks are written by Bauhaus (Daniel Ash, David J, Kevin Haskins and Peter Murphy).

Side A
No.	Title	Length
1.	"Hair of the Dog"	2:43
2.	"The Passion of Lovers"	3:53
3.	"Of Lilies and Remains"	3:18
4.	"Dancing"	2:29
5.	"Hollow Hills"	4:47

Side B
No.	Title	Length
6.	"Kick in the Eye"	3:39
7.	"In Fear of Fear"	2:58
8.	"Muscle in Plastic"	2:51
9.	"The Man with X-Ray Eyes"	3:05
10.	"Mask"	4:36

CD reissue bonus tracks
No.	Title	Length
11.	"In Fear of Dub"	2:55
12.	"Earwax"	3:15
13.	"Harry"	2:47
14.	"1. David Jay 2. Peter Murphy 3. Kevin Haskins 4. Daniel Ash"	6:37
15.	"Satori"	4:36

Bonus disc: Singles and Out-Takes
No.	Title	Writer(s)	Length
1.	"Kick in the Eye" (original single version; BEG 54[A])		3:38
2.	"Satori" (BEG 54T[B])		4:35
3.	"In Fear of Fear" (original version; previously unreleased)		2:43
4.	"In Fear of Dub" (BEG 74T[A])		2:57
5.	"Muscle in Plastic" (rough mix version; previously unreleased)		3:01
6.	"Dancing" (rough mix version)		2:33
7.	"Hair of the Dog" (rough mix version; previously unreleased)		2:53
8.	"Monkey (Poison Pen)" (rough mix version; previously unreleased)		3:17
9.	"Ziggy Stardust" (rough demo version; previously unreleased, also includes a rehearsal of "Cracked Actor")	David Bowie	4:12
10.	"Earwax" (full unedited version; previously unreleased)		3:29
11.	"1-2-3-4" (a.k.a. "1. David Jay 2. Peter Murphy 3. Kevin Haskins 4. Daniel Ash"; BEG 59[B])		6:33
12.	"Muscle in Plastic" (rejected album mix; previously unreleased)		3:22
13.	"Hollow Hills" (rejected album mix; previously unreleased)		4:49
14.	"Hair of the Dog" (rejected album mix; previously unreleased)		2:38
15.	"Poison Pen" (previously unreleased)		3:18
16.	"Kick in the Eye" (single re-mix version; BEG 54T[A])		4:01
17.	"Dave and Danny's Waspie Dub #2" (previously unreleased)		5:53

Bonus disc: This Is for When...
No.	Title	Writer(s)	Length
1.	"This Is for When" (performed by Alan Moore)	Moore	1:31
2.	"The Passion of Lovers"		3:35
3.	"In the Flat Field"		4:10
4.	"Silent Hedges"		3:30
5.	"In Fear of Fear"		3:18
6.	"Terror Couple Kill Colonel"		3:43
7.	"The Man with X-Ray Eyes"		3:59
8.	"Dancing"		2:57
9.	"Mask"		5:50
10.	"Rosegarden Funeral of Sores"	John Cale	5:20
11.	"Hair of the Dog"		3:13
12.	"Kick in the Eye"		4:15
13.	"A God in an Alcove"		3:48
14.	"Hollow Hills"		4:29
15.	"Stigmata Martyr"		3:55
16.	"Dark Entries"		5:55
17.	"Bela Lugosi's Dead"		9:48

== Personnel ==
Bauhaus

- Peter Murphy – vocals, additional guitar, production
- Daniel Ash – guitars, saxophone, album cover illustration, production
- David J – bass guitar, vocals, production
- Kevin Haskins – drums, keyboards, production

Technical

- John Etchells – engineering
- Kenny Jones – engineering
- Mike Hedges – engineering
- Arun Chakraverty – mastering
- Sheila Rock – sleeve photography
- John Dent – 2009 CD remastering

== Charts ==
Chart performances for Mask
Chart (1981)	Peak position
UK Albums (Official Charts)	30

== Certifications ==
Certifications for Mask
Region	Certification	Certified units/sales
United Kingdom (BPI)	Silver	60,000^{^}
^{*} Sales figures based on certification alone.

== Sources ==
- Shirley, Ian (1994). Dark Entries: Bauhaus and Beyond. SAF. ISBN 0-946719-136.
