= Burning from the Inside =

Studio album by Bauhaus
- Released: 15 July 1983
- Studio: Rockfield, Wales
- Genre: Post-punk
- Length: 40:35
- Label: Beggars Banquet, A&M (US only)
- Producer: Bauhaus

Bauhaus chronology
The Sky's Gone Out (1982)	Burning from the Inside (1983)	Go Away White (2008)

Burning from the Inside is the fourth studio album by English gothic rock band Bauhaus, released on 15 July 1983 by record label Beggars Banquet. It peaked at No. 13 on the UK Albums Chart. The single "She's in Parties" reached No. 26 on the UK Singles Chart.

== Recording and production ==
During the recording of the album, singer Peter Murphy was ill, leaving the rest of the band to undertake much of the writing and recording process without him. As evidence of how much input the rest of the band had on the album, bassist David J and guitarist Daniel Ash sang lead vocals on four of the songs. This, combined with the fact that the band started recording without Murphy, led to internal difficulties, and by the time the album was released, they had already broken up. In 2015, David J announced in a solo performance that the album's title came from an incident in which he and Ash were smoking hash in a car and the car caught fire, burning from the inside.

== Reception ==
Professional ratings
Review scores
Source	Rating
AllMusic	3/5 stars

Ned Raggett, writing for The Quietus in 2013, called the album "a compelling sprawl at its best, a case for fragmentation as beauty".

== Track listing ==
All tracks are written by Bauhaus (Daniel Ash, David J, Kevin Haskins and Peter Murphy).

No.	Title	Length
1.	"She's in Parties"	5:49
2.	"Antonin Artaud"	4:09
3.	"Wasp" (instrumental)	0:20
4.	"King Volcano"	3:29
5.	"Who Killed Mr. Moonlight"	4:55

Side B
No.	Title	Length
6.	"Slice of Life"	3:43
7.	"Honeymoon Croon"	2:52
8.	"Kingdom's Coming"	2:25
9.	"Burning from the Inside"	9:21
10.	"Hope"	3:17

CD reissue bonus tracks
No.	Title	Length
11.	"Lagartija Nick"	3:30
12.	"Here's the Dub (Special Effects By 'Loonatik & Drinks')"	3:18
13.	"Departure"	4:49
14.	"Sanity Assassin"	4:05

== Personnel ==
Bauhaus

- Peter Murphy – lead vocals
- Daniel Ash – guitars, backing vocals, saxophone, lead vocals on "Slice of Life"
- David J – bass, backing vocals, lead vocals on "Who Killed Mr. Moonlight"
- Kevin Haskins – drums, keyboards

== Charts ==
Chart performances for Burning from the Inside
Chart (1983)	Peak position
UK Albums (Official Charts)	13
