= Bela Lugosi's Dead =

1979 single by Bauhaus

Single by Bauhaus
- B-side: "Boys"
- Released: August 1979
- Recorded: 26 January 1979
- Studio: Beck Studios, Wellingborough
- Genre: Gothic rock; dub
- Length: 9:36
- Label: Small Wonder
- Songwriters: David J; Kevin Haskins; Peter Murphy; Daniel Ash

Bauhaus singles chronology
"Bela Lugosi's Dead" (1979)	"Dark Entries" (1980)

"Bela Lugosi's Dead" is the debut single by the English post-punk band Bauhaus, released in August 1979 on the Small Wonder label. Retrospectively it is often considered the first gothic rock record.

== History ==
"Bela Lugosi's Dead" was recorded live in the studio in a single take during a six-hour session at Beck Studios in Wellingborough on 26 January 1979. It was the first work they recorded together, six weeks after the band had formed. All four band members are credited as writers of the song: vocalist Peter Murphy, guitarist Daniel Ash, drummer Kevin Haskins and bassist David J (as David Haskins). David J has claimed that he wrote the lyrics. Alternate versions of "Bela Lugosi's Dead" also included a portion of the early demo recording of their next single, "Dark Entries".

Four additional songs were also recorded during the same session: "Boys"; "Bite My Hip"; "Some Faces" and the ska-reggae tune "Harry", which was about Deborah Harry, the lead singer of Blondie. Regarding this session, Kevin Haskins said, "There's power pop in there, and ska too. We were trying to find our voice."

Of the songs recorded during that session (aside from "Bela Lugosi's Dead") only "Harry" found an official release, in 1982 as a B-side to the single "Kick in the Eye." A version of "Boys" recorded at Beck Studios later in 1979 was used as a B-side to the original release of the "Bela Lugosi's Dead" single. The remaining tracks, including the original recording of "Boys", remained unreleased until 2018 when The Bela Session was released on vinyl and CD, and made available for digital download by the band. Of the additional tracks, Classic Rock magazine wrote that, "The rest of the material finds a band fumbling for direction, even touching on ska."

== Content and critical reception ==
"We were very influenced by reggae, especially dub. I mean, basically Bela was our interpretation of dub."

— David J

The song is over nine minutes long; the vocals start (in the studio version) almost three minutes into the track. The dub-influenced guitar sound was achieved by using partial barre chords and leaving the top E and B strings open.

The song takes its name from the horror film star Bela Lugosi, who is known for his role as the title character in the 1931 film Dracula. After a career decline in his later years, Lugosi died in 1956 at the age of 73.

The sleeve cover art was taken from the 1926 film The Sorrows of Satan, directed by D. W. Griffith.

The single was reviewed in Sounds on 22 September 1979. They wrote the song was "a surprise peach... the record becomes heavier and heavier as the moody intensity builds... A nice experience".

== Releases ==
"Bela Lugosi's Dead" was released in August 1979, but did not enter the UK charts. The original 12″ release was on black vinyl pressed at the WEA pressing plant in London. Once this had sold out the record was unavailable for some months. It was re-pressed in late 1980, including a limited edition of 5,000 copies on white vinyl. Various other releases are included in the following:

- Black vinyl with black-on-white sleeve (up to five versions exist, based on comparisons of runout matrices on each of the releases and sleeve format)
- Blue vinyl with blue-on-white sleeve
- Clear vinyl with brown-on-white sleeve
- Green transparent vinyl with green-on-white sleeve
- Pink vinyl with pink-on-white sleeve
- Purple transparent vinyl with purple-on-white sleeve
- Glow-in-the-dark vinyl picture disc with clear plastic sleeve

It had a few releases on CD single:

- Small Wonder, 1988 (black-on-white cover in J-case; without "Dark Entries (Demo)")
- Bauhausmusik, 1998 (cover image with black border and red band logo and title on cardboard sleeve)
- Self-released, 2005 (cover image imposed on moon photo with black background and white band logo on cardboard sleeve; without "Dark Entries (Demo)", but adding "The Dog's a Vapour")

The song was included on the 1998 Bauhaus compilation album Crackle. In 2018, the track was released again on vinyl, CD and digital download as part of The Bela Session, along with four other recordings made during the same session in early 1979, three of which were unreleased up to that point.

=== Other releases ===
In the 1983 erotic horror film The Hunger, Bauhaus performs the song during the opening credits and introduction. A 7″ promotional record featuring an edited version of the song was released to theaters playing the film. A live version of the track, released in 1982 and recorded on 24 February 1982 at The Old Vic, London, is found on Press the Eject and Give Me the Tape, and the same version is also found on the band's compilation album Bauhaus 1979–1983. For the 1998 greatest-hits collection Crackle, Beggars Banquet stitched together the "Tomb Raider Version" from outtakes and live recordings. The band never approved it and refers to it instead as the "Frankenstein version".

== Legacy ==
"Bela Lugosi's Dead" is roundly established by goth historians as the first true record in the genre. For comparison's sake, goth icons the Cure and Siouxsie and the Banshees were certainly releasing records at the same time that Bauhaus delivered its premiere single, but the aforementioned bands didn't go full-on goth until 1980–81. The song also precedes all the early recognized alt-rock masterworks.

— "Bela Lugosi's Dead": 30 Years of Goth, Gloom, and Post-Post-Punk, PopMatters, October 2009.

"Bela Lugosi's Dead" is considered the harbinger of gothic rock music and has been immensely influential on contemporary goth culture. In an article by The Guardian titled "Bauhaus invent goth", the newspaper ranked the song number 19 on their list of the 50 key events in indie music history, stating:

"Bela Lugosi's Dead" would have been just another piece of post-punk experimentation had it not been for the lyrics, which depicted the funeral of the Dracula star, with bats swooping and virgin brides marching past his coffin. The effect was so irresistibly theatrical that dozens of bands formed in its wake. So many, in fact, that goth quickly became a very codified musical genre.

Speaking retrospectively while on tour in 1990, Peter Murphy remarked:

"People thought it was dead serious," Murphy said with a full-bodied laugh. "It was actually dead funny, a song 9 1/2 minutes long called "Bela Lugosi's Dead", with all the seriousness of a Shakespeare play. It's hilarious to see Bela Lugosi as the hero of a song."

The song was ranked #60 in Rolling Stone's "The 100 Greatest Debut Singles of All Time" listicle in 2020.

== Other versions ==
=== "Bela Lugosi's Dead (Undead Is Forever)" ===
- Bauhaus bassist David J, in collaboration with Jill Tracy, released "Bela Lugosi's Dead (Undead Is Forever)" on 31 October 2013.

=== Cover versions ===
- Nine Inch Nails covered it with Peter Murphy during a live performance in 2009.
- Trent Reznor covered it with Peter Murphy and TV on the Radio during a live performance in 2006.
- Massive Attack covered it during a live performance in 2013 and 2019.
- Dead Cross covered it for their album Dead Cross (2017).
- The Damned covered it during a live performance in 2019.

== Track listing ==
12″ single

Side A
No.	Title	Length
1.	"Bela Lugosi's Dead"	9:36
Total length:		9:36

Side B
No.	Title	Length
2.	"Boys"	3:06
3.	"Dark Entries (Demo)"	1:23
Total length:		4:29

The Hunger Mix

No.	Title	Length
1.	"Bela Lugosi Is Dead (The Hunger Mix)"	6:53

The Bela Session EP

No.	Title	Length
1.	"Bela Lugosi's Dead (Official Version)"	9:36
2.	"Some Faces"	2:22
3.	"Bite My Hip"	2:51
4.	"Harry"	2:46
5.	"Boys (Original Version)"	3:03

== Personnel ==
Bauhaus

- Peter Murphy: vocals
- Daniel Ash: guitars
- David J: bass
- Kevin Haskins: drums
