= Spirit (Bauhaus song) =

1982 single by Bauhaus

Single by Bauhaus

from the album The Sky's Gone Out
- B-side: "Terror Couple Kill Colonel (Live in Paris)"
- Released: July 1982
- Genre: Post-punk; gothic rock
- Length: 5:28
- Label: Beggars Banquet
- Songwriters: Daniel Ash; Kevin Haskins; David J. Haskins; Peter Murphy
- Producer: Hugh Jones

Bauhaus singles chronology
"The Passion of Lovers" (1981)	"Spirit" (1982)	"Ziggy Stardust" (1982)

"Spirit" is the seventh single released by British gothic rock band Bauhaus. It was released in 7" format by Beggars Banquet Records as a regular release with the band's distinctive logo on both sides (front black on white, back white on black) and as a picture disc in a clear vinyl pouch with white text printed on the reverse.

It peaked at No. 42 in the UK Singles Chart.

A different and longer version of "Spirit" is available on The Sky's Gone Out LP.

== Background ==
Atypical of the band, who usually produced their own music, the song was produced by Hugh Jones.

This resulted in conflict between the band, Jones, and their label. David J explained: "It took ages and ages. Usually we recorded very quickly—we'd do an album in three weeks from start to finish—but that took about nine days, which for us was absurd. There was so much agonising over it more from the producer than us." The song was about "a 'fifth member' of the band—a spirit they felt occupied the stage," with the music video originally intended to show a physical representation of the spirit. It also included "a single dancer with a white face mask and body paint who would come onto the stage whilst the band performed the song and literally 'lift' Peter and give him wings." However, the producers changed the spirit to a spectral female figure "who would walk through the theatre along with a motley crew of clowns and jugglers." The band disliked the music video and wanted to redo it, using their own money to refilm it. David J then claims that, "We did it. Delivered the master to Beggars Banquet. Next week—this was at the time of the video jukebox craze—we went into a pub and we see the original horrible version on the video. So we immediately rang Beggars Banquet and said; 'What's going on?' and they'd send out the wrong one and it had gone off to TV and everything."

== Music ==
The song uses an acoustic guitar with a bossa nova drumbeat. Lyrically, the song was about "a 'fifth member' of the band—a spirit they felt occupied the stage, lifting them to a higher plane when they were playing well."

== Release ==
The single was released in July of 1982, and was intended to break into the Top 30 but only reached No. 42 and lasted for five weeks on the chart. The band was displeased with the single and rerecorded it in 1982 for their third album, The Sky's Gone Out.

== Track listing ==
Spirit
No.	Title	Length
1.	"Spirit"
2.	"Terror Couple Kill Colonel (Live in Paris)"

== Sources ==
- Shirley, Ian (1994). Dark Entries: Bauhaus and Beyond. SAF. ISBN 0-946719-136.
