= Lagartija Nick =

1983 single by Bauhaus

Single by Bauhaus
- Released: 15 January 1983
- Genre: Post punk, gothic rock
- Label: Beggars Banquet Records
- Songwriters: Peter Murphy; Daniel Ash; Kevin Haskins; David J

Bauhaus singles chronology
"Ziggy Stardust" (1982)	"Lagartija Nick" (1983)	"She's in Parties" (1983)

"Lagartija Nick" is a song by English gothic rock band Bauhaus, released as a stand-alone single in 7" and 12" format on the Beggars Banquet Records label in January 1983.

It reached number 44 in the UK Singles Chart.

A version of the song was first recorded as "Bite my Hip" in 1979 at the band's first recording session where their first single was recorded. Murphy and Ash composed the song but did not develop it as the group thought it was too "simplistic". Later, Murphy and David J reworked it, incorporating references to the Devil ("Lagartija Nick" being an old Spanish term) and Leopold von Sacher-Masoch.

== Track listings ==
=== 7" version ===
No.	Title	Length
1.	"Lagartija Nick"
2.	"Paranoia, Paranoia"

=== 12" version ===
No.	Title	Length
1.	"Lagartija Nick"
2.	"Watch That Grandad Go"
3.	"Paranoia, Paranoia"
4.	"In the Flat Field (Live in Paris)"
