= The Passion of Lovers =

Single by Bauhaus

from the album Mask
- Released: 19 June 1981
- Genre: Gothic rock
- Length: 3:51
- Label: Beggars Banquet
- Songwriters: Peter Murphy; Daniel Ash; Kevin Haskins; David J
- Producer: Bauhaus

Bauhaus singles chronology
| "Kick in the Eye" (1981) | "The Passion of Lovers" (1981) | "Spirit" (1982) |

"The Passion of Lovers" is the sixth single released by British gothic rock band Bauhaus. It was released in 7" format on the Beggars Banquet label in 1981. The initial copies came with the lyrics on a printed insert.

It peaked at No. 56 in the UK Singles Chart.

== Content ==
The B-sides of the single featured a montage made up of recordings that each member of the band created individually, the fourth part featuring the backwards masking techniques that Daniel Ash focused on in later recordings, particularly with the band Tones on Tail.

The actual words Ash says are: "Naturally enough ... the others have been doing their utmost to match this performance ... this is something people get when they continually drink whisky... I can't drink... I hardly eat these days.... okay, that's fine".

== Track listing ==
1. "The Passion of Lovers"
2. "1. David Jay 2. Peter Murphy 3. Kevin Haskins 4. Daniel Ash"

== Personnel ==
Adapted from the Mask liner notes.

- Peter Murphy - lead vocals
- Daniel Ash - guitar, backing vocals, backwards vocals (track 2)
- David J - bass, lead vocals, backing vocals, keyboards, piano (track 2)
- Kevin Haskins - drums, percussion, drum machine (track 2), Tibetan bell (track 2)
