= She's in Parties =

Single by Bauhaus

from the album Burning from the Inside
- Released: April 1983
- Genre: Gothic rock; post-punk
- Length: 5:49 (12" mix); 3:45 (7" edit)
- Label: Beggars Banquet
- Songwriters: Bauhaus (Daniel Ash, David J, Kevin Haskins and Peter Murphy)
- Producer: Bauhaus

Bauhaus singles chronology
"Lagartija Nick" (1983)	"She's in Parties" (1983)	"Sanity Assassin" (1983)

"She's in Parties" is a song by English gothic rock band Bauhaus. It was released in April 1983 as a single in both 7" and 12" format on the Beggars Banquet label. An extended version of the song appeared on both the 12” single and on the group's fourth studio album, Burning from the Inside.

The official video was directed by Howard Guard and the model is Gail Lawson. It was the band's final commercially released single. The song reached No. 26 in the UK Singles Chart.

== Legacy ==
The song was used in The Ongoing History of New Music 1998 episode "What's the Big Deal About Bauhaus?". The line "She's in parties" is frequently quoted in "What Was Her Name?" by Dave Clarke and Chicks on Speed.

The song was covered by Estonian artist Kerli on her self-titled EP (2007), by English heavy metal band A Forest of Stars as a bonus track on their third album, A Shadowplay for Yesterdays (2012) and by English new wave band In Isolation as a double A-side digital single alongside "TRAPPIST-1" (2017).

Uruguayan gothic rock band RRRRRRR covered the song in 2010 and released as a single from the album Gothic BA "Echoes of Darkness Compilation Vol. 1".

English rock band Crippled Black Phoenix covered the song on their 2020 album Ellengæst.

English indie rock band She's In Parties, who released their debut EP in 2023, are named after the song.

The title of the track was parodied by Birkenhead-based band Half Man Half Biscuit as "She's in Broadstairs" on their 2001 album Cammell Laird Social Club.

== Track listings ==
=== 7" version ===
Side A
No.	Title	Length
1.	"She's in Parties"	3:45

Side B
No.	Title	Length
1.	"Departure"	4:49

=== 12" version ===
Side A
No.	Title	Length
1.	"She's in Parties"	5:49

Side B
No.	Title	Length
1.	"Here's the Dub" (Special Effects by "Loonatik & Drinks")	3:18
2.	"Departure"	4:49
