= Terror Couple Kill Colonel =

1980 single by Bauhaus

Single by Bauhaus
- Released: 2 June 1980
- Genre: Post-punk, gothic rock
- Label: 4AD
- Songwriters: Daniel Ash; Kevin Michael Dompe; David John Haskins; Peter Murphy

Bauhaus singles chronology
"Dark Entries" (1980)	"Terror Couple Kill Colonel" (1980)	"Telegram Sam" (1980)

"Terror Couple Kill Colonel" is a song by English gothic rock band Bauhaus, released as a stand-alone single in June 1980.

== Release ==
"Terror Couple Kill Colonel" reached No. 5 in the UK Independent Singles Chart.

The title came from a newspaper headline reporting a Red Army Faction attack that killed Paul Bloomquist.

Original sleeves were printed on a textured fabric. Two versions of this record exist; each having a different recording of "Terror Couple Kill Colonel (Version)" on the B-side. The rarer (mispressing) is noted by the matrix "TA1PE AD 7 AA1" in the run-out groove.

== Track listing ==
1. "Terror Couple Kill Colonel"
2. "Scopes"
3. "Terror Couple Kill Colonel (Version)"
