= Bauhaus (band) =

English rock band

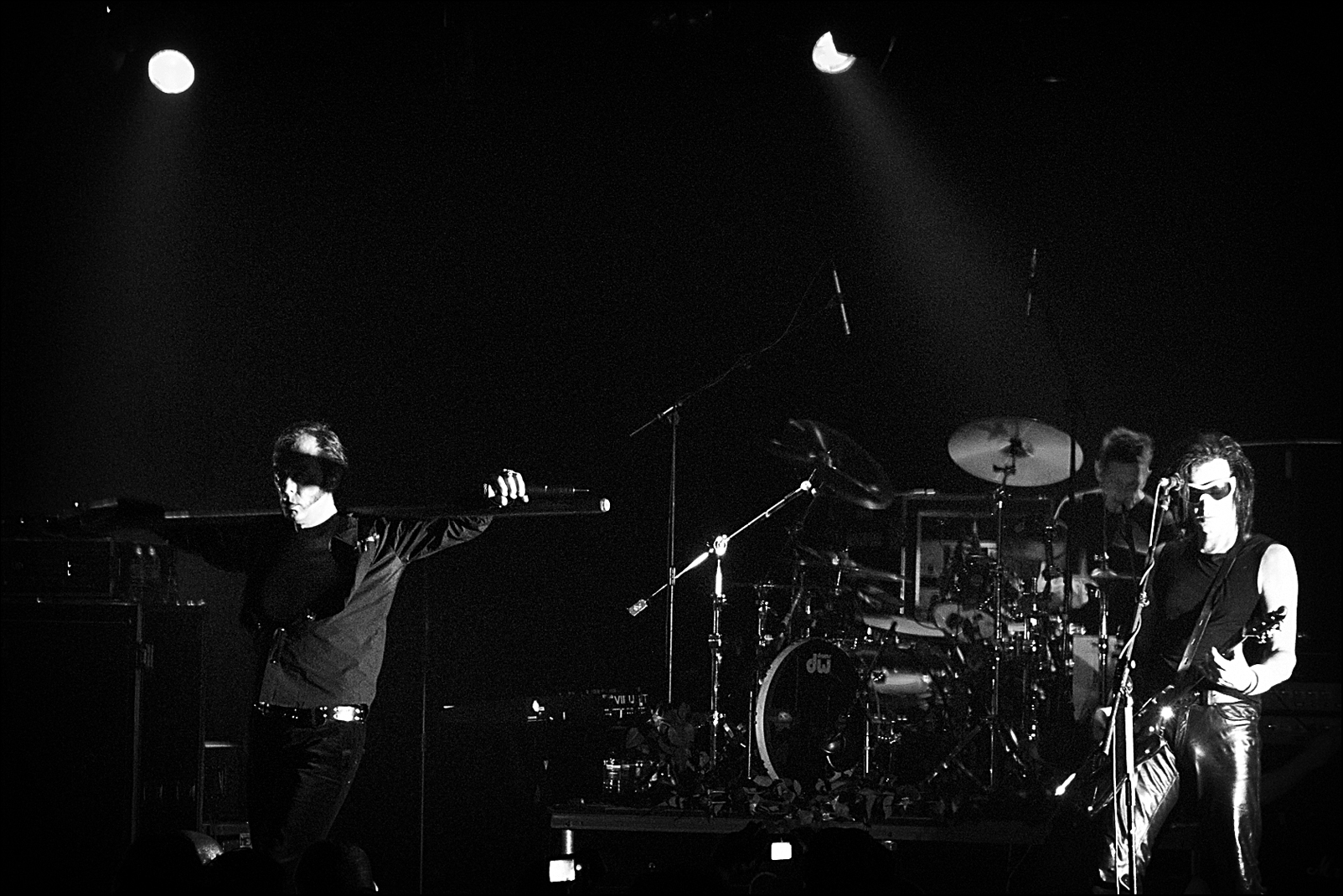
- Bauhaus performing in 2006

Background information
- Also known as: S.R. (1978); Bauhaus 1919 (1978)
- Origin: Northampton, England
- Genres: Post-punk; gothic rock; art rock; avant-garde; experimental
- Works: Bauhaus discography
- Years active: 1978–1983; 1998; 2005–2008; 2019; 2022
- Labels: Small Wonder; 4AD; Beggars Banquet
- Spinoffs: Dalis Car; Love and Rockets; Poptone; Tones on Tail
- Spinoff of: The Craze
- Past members: Daniel Ash; Peter Murphy; Kevin Haskins; David J

Bauhaus were an English rock band formed in Northampton in 1978. Known for their dark image and gloomy sound, Bauhaus are one of the pioneers of gothic rock, although they mixed many genres, including dub, glam rock, psychedelia, and funk. The group consisted of Daniel Ash (guitar, saxophone), Peter Murphy (vocals, occasional instruments), Kevin Haskins (drums) and David J (bass).

The band formed under the name Bauhaus 1919, in reference to the first operating year of the German art school Bauhaus, but they shortened this name within a year of formation. Their 1979 debut single "Bela Lugosi's Dead" is considered one of the harbingers of gothic rock music and has been influential on contemporary goth culture. Their debut album, In the Flat Field, is regarded as one of the first gothic rock records. Their 1981 second album Mask expanded their sound by incorporating a wider variety of instruments—such as keyboards, saxophone and acoustic guitar—and experimenting with funk-inspired rhythms on tracks like "Kick in the Eye".

Bauhaus went on to achieve mainstream success in the United Kingdom with their third album, The Sky's Gone Out, which peaked at No. 3 on the UK Albums Chart in 1982. That same year, they also reached No. 15 on the Singles Chart with a standalone cover of David Bowie's "Ziggy Stardust", earning them an appearance on Top of the Pops. During recording sessions for their next album, Murphy fell ill and spent much of his time away from the studio, leaving the rest of the band to compensate for his absence. This created a rift between the singer and his bandmates, culminating in the group breaking up on 5 July 1983, one week before Burning from the Inside was released. Featuring the Top 30 UK single "She's in Parties", it would be their final studio album composed entirely of new material for a quarter of a century.

After Bauhaus's break-up, Murphy formed Dalis Car with bassist Mick Karn before beginning a solo career, while Ash and Haskins continued as Tones on Tail and, later, reunited with David J to form Love and Rockets. Murphy's solo career enjoyed greater commercial success in the United States than Bauhaus, as did Love and Rockets. Bauhaus eventually reunited for a 1998 tour, again from 2005 to 2008, and in 2019 and 2022.

== History ==
The emblem of the German art school Bauhaus, designed by Oskar Schlemmer in 1922: it was reused by the members of Bauhaus in the 1980s for promoting their music via posters and record sleeves

Daniel Ash, his friend David J. Haskins and Haskins' younger brother Kevin had played together in various bands since childhood such as Jam and Jackplug & the Sockets, playing cover songs by the Rolling Stones and the Beatles. Ash initially tried unsuccessfully to convince his school friend Peter Murphy to join him in a band. According to Ash: "Pete didn't think about it at all, it wasn't on his mind as such." Ash's band the Craze performed several times around Northampton in 1978. When the Craze dissolved, Ash once again tried to convince Murphy to join him, simply because Ash thought that Murphy had the right look for a band. Murphy, who was working in a printing factory, agreed to try it, although he had never written any lyrics or music. During their first rehearsal, he co-wrote the song "In the Flat Field".

Ash's old bandmate Kevin Haskins joined as the drummer. Ash intentionally avoided inviting David J, the driving force in their previous bands, because he wanted a band that he could control. Instead, Chris Barber was recruited to play bass, and together the four musicians formed the band S.R. However, within a few weeks, Ash relented and replaced Barber with David J, who suggested the new name of Bauhaus 1919. David J had already agreed to tour American airbases with another band but decided that joining his friends' group was "the right thing to do". With their line-up complete, the band played their first gig at the Cromwell pub (since demolished) in Wellingborough on New Year's Eve 1978.

The band had chosen the name Bauhaus 1919, a reference to the German Bauhaus art movement of the 1920s, because of its "stylistic implications and associations", according to David J. The band also chose the same typeface used on the Bauhaus college building in Dessau, Germany, as well as the Bauhaus emblem, designed by Oskar Schlemmer. Bauhaus associate Graham Bentley said that the group was unlike any Northampton band of the time, most of whom played predominantly cover songs. Bentley videotaped a performance by the group, which was sent to several record labels, in the hope of obtaining a contract. This approach was hindered partly because many record companies did not have home-video equipment, so the group opted to record a demo.

=== "Bela Lugosi's Dead" and 4AD ===
==== "Bela Lugosi's Dead" ====
"We'd been talking about the erotic quality of vampire movies, even if they were the Hammer horror type. There was this conversation about the sexuality and eroticism of Dracula. Danny talked about his fascination with this and the occult connotations. So, we carried on that conversation and made it into a song."

— Peter Murphy, on the origins of "Bela Lugosi's Dead"

After only six weeks as a band, Bauhaus entered the studio for the first time, meeting at Beck Studios in Wellingborough to record a demo. In rehearsal, the band experimented with echo and delay effects on the drums. The first of five tracks recorded during the session, "Bela Lugosi's Dead", exceeded nine minutes in length but was released as the group's debut single on Small Wonder Records, in August 1979 according to Alexis Petridis. The BBC archives mentioned that radio DJ John Peel first broadcast "Bela Lugosi's Dead" in his show in September 1979. The single was reviewed in Sounds on 22 September 1979 as a record with "a moody intensity". The band was listed simply as Bauhaus, with the "1919" abandoned.

"Bela Lugosi's Dead" was strongly influenced by the band's interest in reggae and dub, styles in which the bass and the drums play prominent roles. The recording was completed on the first take. It was also the first time that Murphy had sung into a studio microphone, although he was sick with a cold when he recorded the song. Kevin Haskins' drumbeat was based on a bossa nova style. Daniel Ash explained the inception of the song: "I was talking to David (J, bass) on the blower one night and told him I had this riff, using these trick chords that had a very haunting quality to it. He went: 'It's so weird you should say that because I've got these lyrics about Bela Lugosi, the actor who played a vampire.'" David J further elaborated: "There was a season of old horror films on radio, and I was telling Daniel about how much I loved them. The one that had been on the night before was Dracula [1931]. I was saying how Bela Lugosi was the quintessential Dracula, the elegant depiction of the character." Ash elaborated about the chords: "My riff has these mutant chords – they're not even minor chords – but it's rooted in an old Gary Glitter song, slowed right down. I didn't realize that when I was doing it." Ash also explained how he was able to achieve the echo effects for the song: "...David had this old HH echo unit, which would crap out on you all the time. We hooked up the guitar and snare drum to this echo unit and I was just sliding the HH amp thing to trigger all these echoes as the song went through." David J explained the song's recording process: "We didn't really talk about what we were doing. Daniel started scratching away on the guitar, Kevin started his rhythm and there was this atmosphere building. I came in with those descending chords and Peter was just prowling up and down, slowly, like a big cat."

Murphy explained: "There's an erotic, alluring element to the vampire. We didn't want to write an ode to Bela Lugosi, ostensibly. The kitsch element was his name because he was the biggest icon, yet he was the most unlikely vampire-looking person. So there was that Brit angle to it, but it wasn't at all negative. It was perfect. The idea of Bela Lugosi being dead or undead is classic." Because the song was nine-and-a-half minutes long, with the instrumental introduction alone longer than many entire singles, the band struggled to find a label willing to release it. Peter Stennet of Small Wonder Records, however, ultimately agreed to do so, having favourably compared it to Velvet Underground's 17-minute improvised noise track "Sister Ray".

The single received a positive review in Sounds and stayed on the British independent charts for two years. It received crucial airplay on BBC Radio 1 and DJ John Peel's evening show. The band recorded a session for Peel's show, which was broadcast on 3 January 1980. After the band introduced themselves on his show, Peel said, "We've got Bauhaus in the studio, they're from Northampton and they have a new single out called 'Bela Lugosi's Dead'. It's nine and a half minutes long and this will probably be the first and last time I'll play this." After the initial broadcast, according to Murphy, "The BBC switchboard was jammed with listeners wanting him to play it again." Of the additional tracks, Classic Rock wrote that, "The rest of the material finds a band fumbling for direction, even touching on ska."

==== In the Flat Field ====
Despite the success of their signature song, the band left Small Wonder Records because of its lack of support for touring stemming from budget issues. Stennet stated: "The trouble is we just can't afford to send the bands on tour or anything like that, and a group needs that sort of support." Signing with the 4AD label, Bauhaus released two more singles, "Dark Entries" in January 1980 and "Terror Couple Kill Colonel" in June 1980, before issuing their first album In the Flat Field in October 1980. The album's cover image, selected by David J, is a photograph titled Homage to Purvis de Chavannes by Duane Michals, an image of a naked man blowing a horn instrument. NME reviewer Andy Gill described it as "Gothick-Romantick pseudo-decadence" and dismissed the band as "a hip Black Sabbath". Despite negative reviews, In the Flat Field topped the indie charts and spent one week at No. 72 on the UK Albums Chart. Although the band was satisfied with the album, they later admitted that it had failed to capture everything that they had wanted and that its intensity level was too high, but it was "the purest statement of what [we] were like then".

In August 1980, the band travelled to North America to play four dates in cities such as Toronto, Chicago and New York. One of Bauhaus' first US shows was in a venue called Space Place in Chicago, Illinois in September 1980, booked by Jim Nash and Dannie Flesher, the owners of the independent record label Wax Trax! Records. The band returned to England in October 1980 for a 20-date tour in England and in Europe to promote their first album. In December 1980, Bauhaus released a cover version of "Telegram Sam", originally a hit by glam-rock pioneers T. Rex, as a single.

=== Beggars Banquet and breakup ===
==== Mask ====
Bauhaus' growing success outstripped 4AD's resources, so the band moved to 4AD's parent label, Beggars Banquet Records. Bauhaus released "Kick in the Eye" in March 1981 as its debut release on the label. The single reached No. 59 on the charts. The following single, "The Passion of Lovers", peaked at No. 56 in July 1981. Murphy said, "One of our loves is to make each single totally different from the last, not to be tied down by a style or sound." David J explained the techniques, effects and his reaction regarding the content of the title track to the album: "I can still recall with crystal clarity overdubbing the echoed bass part and using a metal bottleneck to achieve the cascade effect that comes in at the point where Daniel's acoustic twelve-string part starts. Hearing these sounds in ultra-sharp coke-intensified focus through headphones produced an ecstatic heart-bursting emotion on the edge of orgasmic release."

Bauhaus released their second album, Mask, in October 1981. The band employed more keyboards, and a variety of other instruments, to add to the diversity of the record. The front and back cover of the album was an impressionistic drawing created by Ash.

In an unconventional move, the group shot a video for the album's title track as a promotional tool for the band, rather than any specific song from the record, filmed in a hazardous and abandoned Victorian shoe factory in Northampton. The video was filmed early in the morning across from a police station, and made with a minuscule budget; the gear used in the video were powered off car batteries and roll film. The video's imagery and lighting borrowed heavily from German Expressionism. David J commented on the content of the music video: "We improvised around the loose idea of a ritualistic resurrection, with Peter lain out like a corpse on a wooden slab. Each of us would administer some kind of shamanistic voodoo to assist in the raising of the dead. The place was freezing cold, dank, and dripping with filthy water. The lights kept going out, and we would be plunged into complete darkness until they were restored." When the scenes of the factory were finished, the group went to another location for filming. David J explained: "Once we had filmed the scenes in the factory, we set off for a second location: the woods on the grounds of the Spencer family's country estate – another illegal situation, and a potential threat to the monarchy. We did have fun that night! The finished film looked great: a fog-cloaked atmospheric drama that was redolent of a German Expressionist silent horror flick." David J also mentioned that the music video was more of an art piece than a traditional music video and commented that Chris Collins "did a brilliant job of capturing the visual essence of the band." Ultimately, the finished video made only one appearance on British TV.

Around the same time, "In keeping with our surrealist leaning...", the band also employed the "exquisite corpse" technique to an experimental film they made called "Consequences", where each member was given an amount of time to film whatever they wished. It was shown on tour in place of a support band. The band toured broadly to promote the album by playing a 16-date tour of England and 13 dates in Europe.

==== "Spirit" and The Sky's Gone Out ====
In July 1982, Bauhaus released the single "Spirit", produced by Hugh Jones. This was unusual for the band because they typically produced their own music. Conflicts and compromises subsequently occurred in the studio. David J explained: "It took ages and ages. Usually we recorded very quickly—we'd do an album in three weeks from start to finish—but that took about nine days, which for us was absurd. There was so much agonising over it more from the producer than us." The song used an acoustic guitar with a bossa nova drumbeat. According to Shirley, the song was about "a 'fifth member' of the band—a spirit they felt occupied the stage, lifting them to a higher plane when they were playing well." The music video was originally intended to show a physical representation of the spirit, including "a single dancer with a white face mask and body paint who would come onto the stage whilst the band performed the song and literally 'lift' Peter and give him wings." However, the producers changed the spirit to a spectral female figure "who would walk through the theatre along with a motley crew of clowns and jugglers." When the band returned from their tour of the United States, they disliked the music video and wanted to redo it. The record label refused, unwilling to provide more money for it, but according to David J, "We raised the money ourselves out of our own bank balances and pooled our money and so we went in and re-edited it, trying to get it into some kind of shape. We did it. Delivered the master to Beggars Banquet. Next week—this was at the time of the video jukebox craze—we went into a pub and we see the original horrible version on the video. So we immediately rang Beggars Banquet and said; 'What's going on?' and they'd send out the wrong one and it had gone off to TV and everything." The single was intended to break into the Top 30 but only reached No. 42. The band was displeased with the single and rerecorded it in 1982 for their third album, The Sky's Gone Out. Nico made a guest appearance when the band played a gig in Salford University for a cover performance of the Velvet Underground song, "I'm Waiting for the Man".

The band wanted to produce their third LP, The Sky's Gone Out, themselves, but arguments ensued in the studio among the band members over creative direction. The band members realized that they needed an objective perspective on their music, and producer Derek Tompkins was hired. Tompkins commented: "I was, however, quite willing to act as an engineer provided the resident engineer was responsible for the engineering and I was only responsible for interpreting what they wanted to him and helping a bit creatively myself."

The band were booked into Rockfield Studios in Wales for one month to record the album but had little original material written beforehand. Murphy explained: "The third LP was one of those unwritten albums that was done on the spot. An album of experimentation which was enjoyable to us because we didn't have any songs and we didn't feel like writing stuff and we said, "OK that's fine. If we don't have any songs we'll make the songwriting environment the studio." Although the sessions were successful, conflicts arose between the band and engineer, with Tompkins as the mediator. Although Tompkins did not understand the album's music or lyrics, he "always used to ask them what the song was about so I knew what mood I was aiming for". Some of the lyrics reflected the band's personal feelings and experiences, such as "All We Ever Wanted Was Everything". According to David J, the song "evokes nostalgic memories of a time of innocence and naive yearning." David J praised Murphy's vocals on the song as "emoting the bittersweet sentiment so perfectly, every word ringing true."

That same year, Bauhaus scored their greatest hit with a cover of David Bowie's "Ziggy Stardust", which was recorded during a BBC session. The song was chosen by the band in response to critics who had accused them of copying Bowie's sound. Ash explained: "[W]e thought we'd do the opposite of what they'd expect and promptly release 'Ziggy'." The song reached No. 15 on the British charts and earned the band an appearance on the television show Top of the Pops. The Sky's Gone Out also became the band's greatest album success, peaking at No. 3. That same year, Bauhaus appeared in the horror film The Hunger, performing "Bela Lugosi's Dead" during the opening credits. The final cut of the scene focused on Murphy; this, coupled with his modelling work in a popular ad campaign for Maxell, caused resentment among his bandmates.

==== Burning from the Inside ====
Prior to the recording of their fourth album, Burning from the Inside (1983), Murphy was stricken with pneumonia, which prevented him from contributing much to the album. Ash and David assumed control of the album and performed lead vocals on several tracks. The album's song "Who Killed Mister Moonlight" was described by David J as a "surrealistic ballad inspired in part by the murder of John Lennon". Also, the mysterious character of Mister Moonlight had a symbolic meaning, which was seen by the band "as being representative of the dreamy, poetic aspect of Bauhaus". The album's lead single "She's in Parties" reached No. 26 on the charts and earned Bauhaus their third and final Top of the Pops appearance. Bauhaus then embarked on an international promotional tour for the album, with dates in Europe and the Far East. On the night before they were supposed to perform two shows at Hammersmith Palais in London, the group decided to disband.

The band played their farewell show on 5 July 1983 at the Hammersmith Palais. Fans had been warned by the band's crew to not miss the show, without telling them it was the last. After a long encore, consisting of some of their early songs, David J left the stage with the words "rest in peace". Burning from the Inside was released one week later. The album received largely positive reviews and reached No. 13 on the charts. Bauhaus released the single "Sanity Assassin" in limited quantities as a farewell gift to their fan-club members.

=== Post-Bauhaus careers and solo projects ===
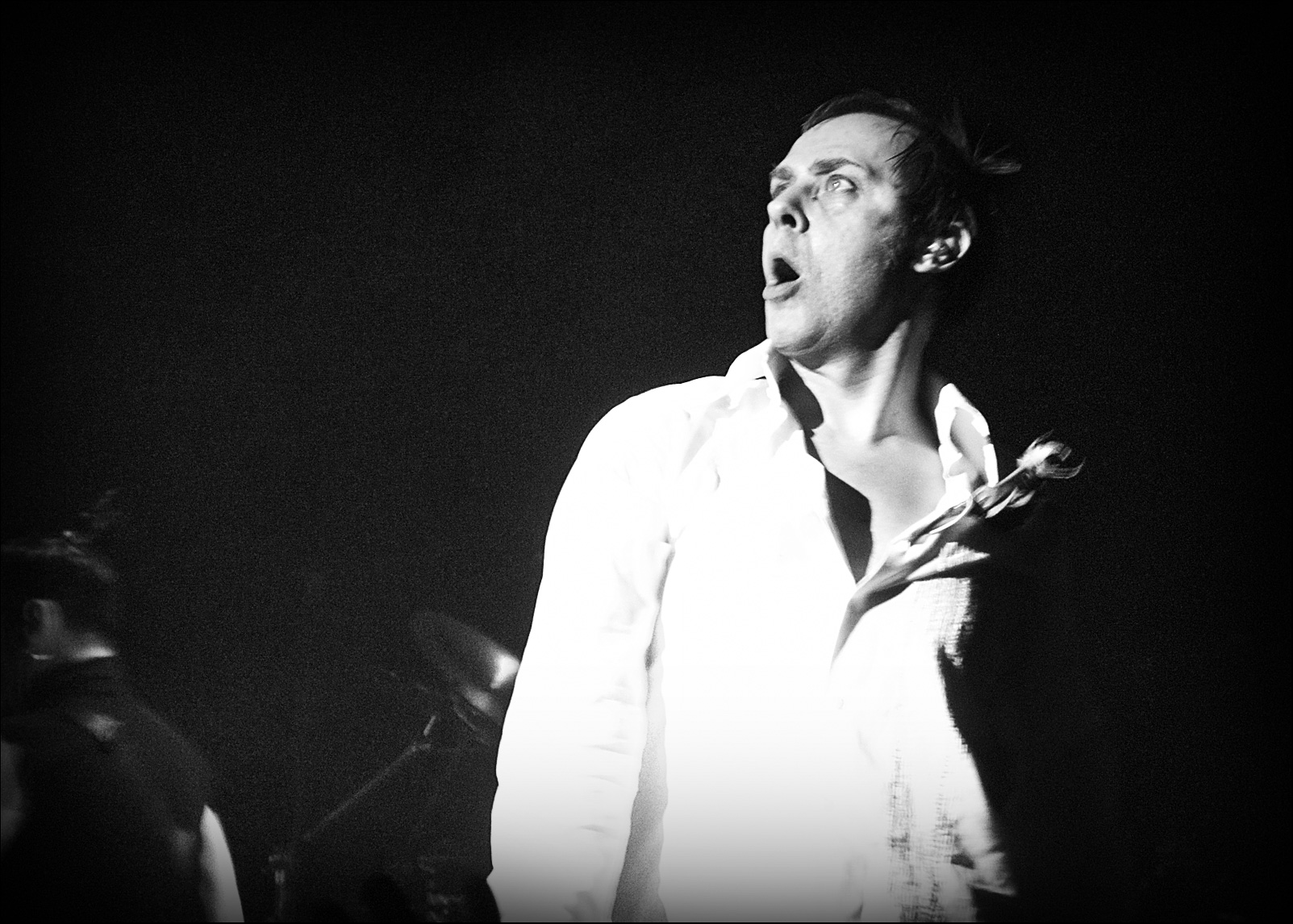
Vocalist Peter Murphy

During the band's initial lifecycle, solo projects would be initiated at times. In 1981, while still a member of Bauhaus, David J started a solo project with Rene Halkett, an original student of the Bauhaus art school. This correspondence came about due to Halkett's younger neighbour telling him of hearing about a group called Bauhaus on the John Peel Show on BBC radio. This intrigued Halkett and he soon wrote to Peel about getting in touch with the band. They eventually met, discussed poetry and decided to send David a cassette tape that contained Halkett reciting two of his poems, in hopes of enticing David to collaborate with him. After listening intensely to the tape, David decided to go to a recording studio where he created backing music for the tape.

This collaboration resulted in a single called "Armour/Nothing" which was released by 4AD. Halkett commented on his contribution to the single: "I felt that the two poems required something more than print because they depend on things which can only be expressed in musical signs... It (the single) falls between music and poetry and is not entirely either. With "Nothing", David has written a perfect arrangement for what is a quite concentrated philosophical idea and it becomes so much more than the words..."

After Bauhaus disbanded, the members of the band began solo work. Murphy worked briefly with bassist Mick Karn of Japan in the band Dalis Car before embarking on a solo career with albums such as Should the World Fail to Fall Apart (1986), Love Hysteria (1988) and Deep (1989). Ash had already started Tones on Tail with Bauhaus roadie Glen Campling as a side project in 1982. After Bauhaus disbanded, Kevin Haskins joined the group and the trio released an album and several EPs but disbanded after a 1984 American tour. During this time, David J released two solo albums and collaborated with other musicians, recording two albums with the Jazz Butcher, and also with comics writer/spoken-word artist Alan Moore in the short-lived band the Sinister Ducks.

The former members of Bauhaus planned to reform and arranged a rehearsal, but Murphy failed to appear on the scheduled day. However, the other three band members rehearsed and were inspired by the chemistry that they developed as a trio, leading to the formation of Love and Rockets in 1985. Love and Rockets released several highly acclaimed albums and penetrated the American charts with "So Alive" in 1989. The band dissolved in 1999, briefly reunited for a festival tour in 2009 and then reunited in 2023. Both Ash and David J released solo albums during the Love and Rockets years, and Murphy contributed backing vocals to David J's 1992 single "Candy on the Cross".

=== Subsequent developments: reunions and a final album ===
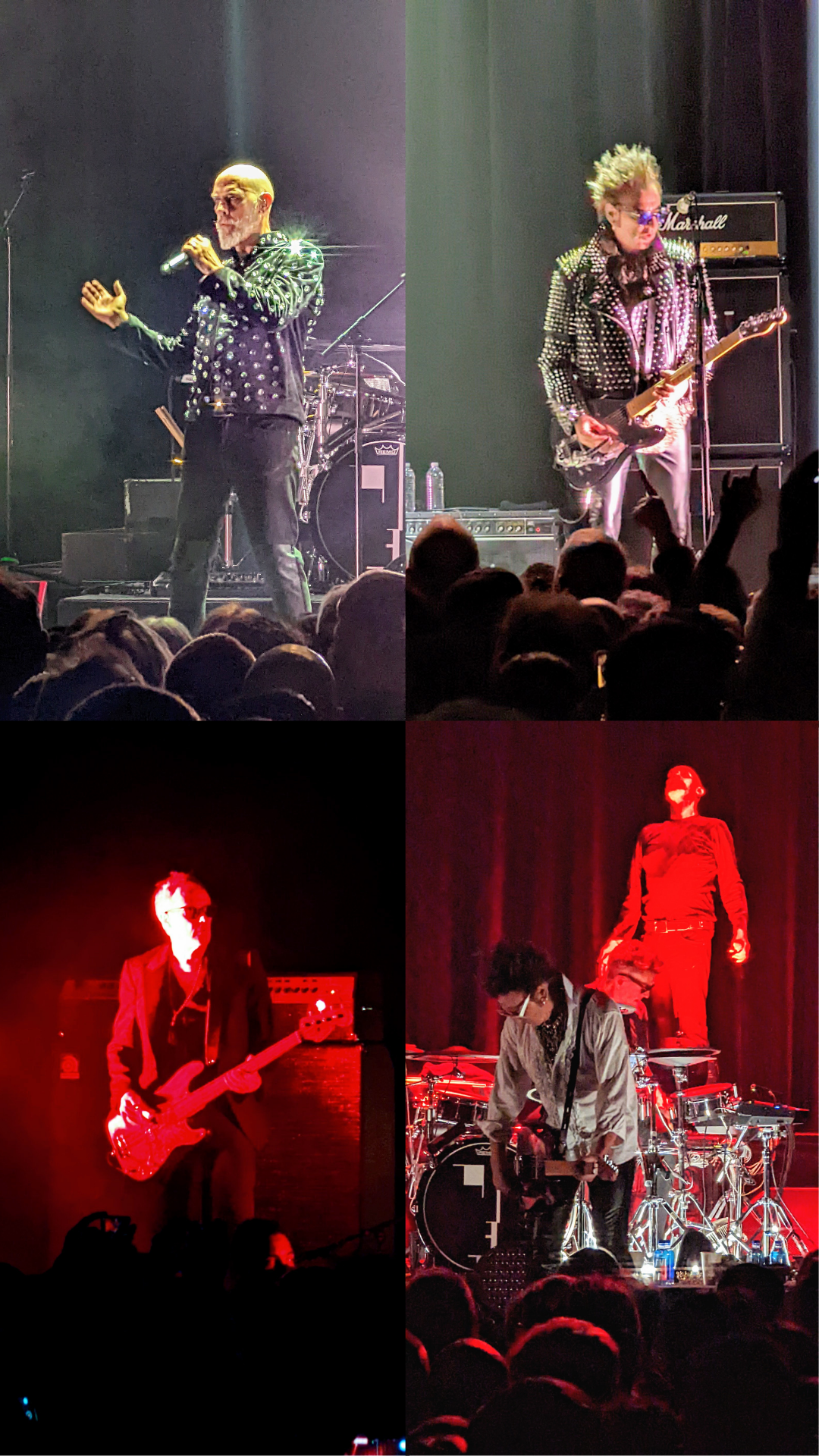
Bauhaus performs at the SF Masonic Auditorium (May 2022).

Bauhaus reunited for the Resurrection Tour in 1998. Their stage show opened with Double Dare and Murphy singing to the audience on a television screen. The tour featured a new song, "The Dog's a Vapour", which was also included in the Heavy Metal 2000 film soundtrack. A live album was recorded during the tour, Gotham, which was released the following year. It included a studio recording of Bauhaus' cover of the Dead Can Dance song "Severance".

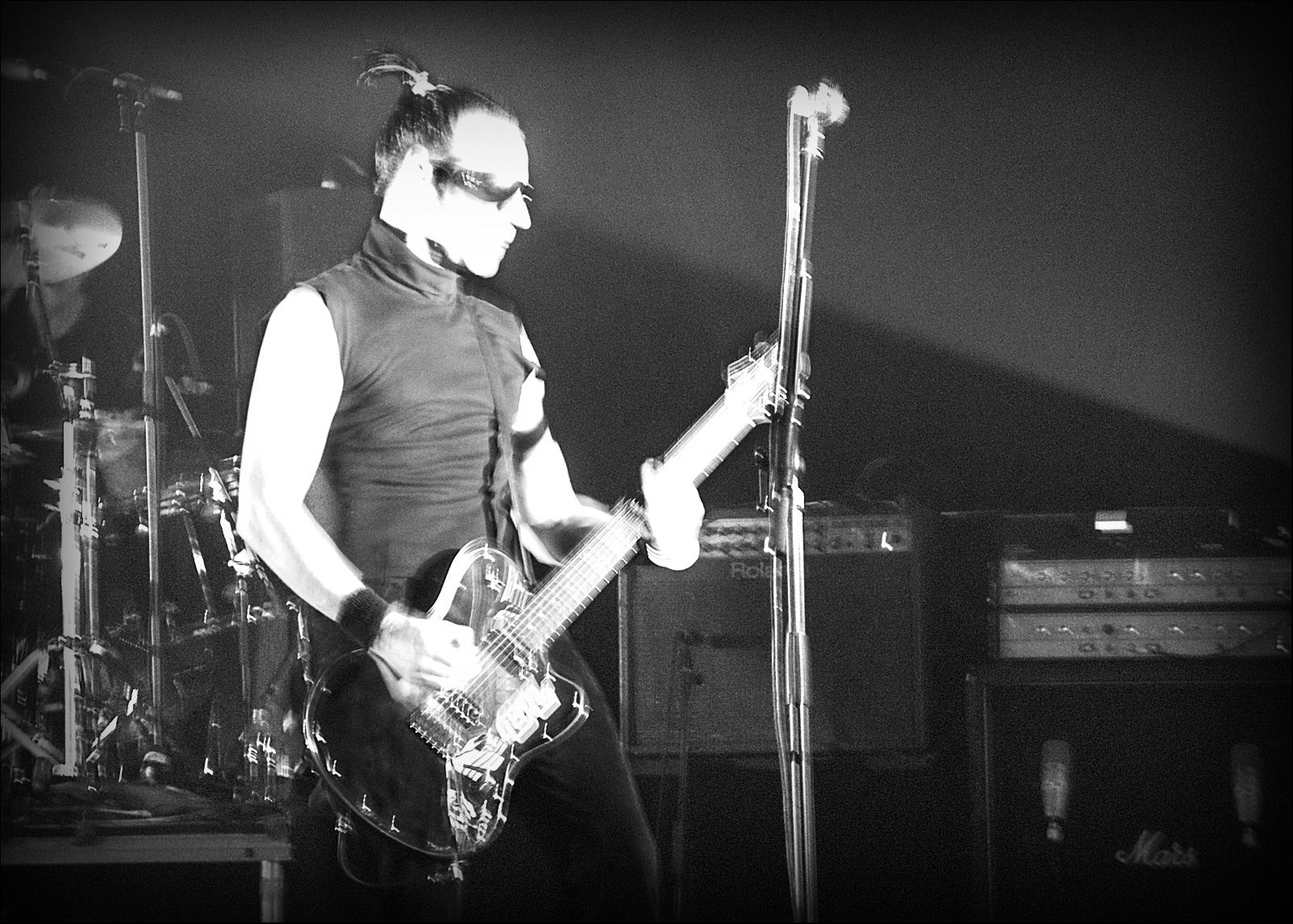
Daniel Ash in 2006

Bauhaus reunited again in 2005, playing the Coachella Festival in Indio, California. Their set opened with Murphy being lowered upside-down to the stage while singing "Bela Lugosi's Dead". Following Murphy's 2005 tour, Bauhaus embarked on a full tour beginning in North America in Autumn 2005 and ending in Europe in February 2006. During the tour, Bauhaus covered Joy Division's "Transmission". The band also mentioned that they hoped to record new music. In May, they performed as the opening act during Nine Inch Nails' American tour.

In 2008, Bauhaus released their first new studio album since 1983, Go Away White, on the Cooking Vinyl label. However, it marked the band's end, and the album had no promotional tour. Haskins later said: "We were getting along really well, but there was an incident that occurred ... Some of us just felt that we didn't want to carry on as a working unit." In early 2008, Murphy claimed that he "was most satisfied with the bonding on an emotional level. It was good to be working together and to put the past behind us and it was very positive. The result was coming out really fast, so it was exciting and it was very enjoyable", but in the end, "that rocky character worked and I think it was a bit right to finish it, really". David J commented on the breakup: "You have a test tube, and you pour in one chemical, and you pour in another chemical, and something happens. It starts to bubble. Pour in another chemical, and it starts to bubble a bit more. You pour in a fourth chemical, and it bubbles really violently, and then explodes. That's my answer".

In 2017, Ash and Haskins toured as Poptone with Haskins' daughter Diva Dompe on bass. The group performed songs by Bauhaus, Tones on Tail and Love and Rockets, along with cover songs. A live album recorded at various stops on the tour was released through PledgeMusic.

In 2018, Murphy and David J announced a tour of New Zealand, Australia and Europe to celebrate the 40th anniversary of Bauhaus, performing In the Flat Field in its entirety.

In September 2019, after a 13-year hiatus, Bauhaus announced a show at the 4,000-seat Hollywood Palladium with all original members on 3 November. A second show was added for the following night after all tickets for the first show sold quickly. A third date at the same venue was confirmed for 1 December.

In March 2022, Bauhaus released their first new song in 14 years with "Drink the New Wine", which was recorded separately by all four members during the COVID-19 lockdown. The recording process used the exquisite corpse method whereby each artist adds to the piece without hearing what the others have done.

Bauhaus toured Europe and the West Coast of the United States in 2022. The band was due to tour the East Coast of the United States, but the tour was cancelled on 31 August as Murphy announced that he was entering rehab. On 19 April 2023, Ash confirmed that the Bauhaus reunion had ended, and the remaining members reformed Love and Rockets.

== Musical style and influences ==
=== Influences ===
"Our influences were many. The obvious ones were glam rock and punk rock, but when we were recording, when we finished each day, we'd usually record in a residential studio so we would all stay together at night time. So when we'd wind down, we'd always play either dub reggae or late Beatles, like Sgt. Pepper. When I mention that to people they're kind of surprised. So we weren't listening to dark music, there were many influences."

— Kevin Haskins, regarding the band's influences.

"We were very influenced by reggae, especially dub. I mean, basically Bela was our interpretation of dub."

— David J, regarding reggae's influence on the band.

According to David J, the bands Bauhaus related to in the post-punk scene were Joy Division, Pere Ubu, Devo, Gang of Four, Cabaret Voltaire, and the Pop Group. Among bands and singers who influenced Bauhaus, they cited Siouxsie and the Banshees, David Bowie, T-Rex, Roxy Music, Syd Barrett's Pink Floyd, New York Dolls, Velvet Underground, Iggy Pop and the Stooges, the Doors, Alice Cooper, MC5, Ramones, the Sex Pistols, the Clash, the Residents, Captain Beefheart, Suicide, Kraftwerk, Neu!, Can, Faust, the Beatles, the Rolling Stones, the Who, Van der Graaf Generator, Bob Dylan, Tom Waits, Serge Gainsbourg, Lee Scratch Perry, King Tubby, Mikey Dread, Kurt Weill, Scott Walker, and Jacques Brel. Specific recordings that were influential on the band include the compilation album Nuggets, Lou Reed's albums Berlin and Transformer, the "Bits and Pieces" single by the Dave Clark Five and the "Double Barrel" single by Dave and Ansell Collins.

In terms of early influences from childhood, David J said that he was interested in jazz and its musicians such as Miles Davis, Charlie Parker and Thelonious Monk. He has also listed Television's Marquee Moon as one of his all-time favourite albums. Peter Murphy cited Doris Day, Simon and Garfunkel, the Beatles, the Everly Brothers and his experiences from Mass in Catholic school as highly influential to his singing. He mentioned that the first 7-inch single he ever bought was "A Hard Day's Night" by the Beatles and also listed Brian Eno's Music for Airports as one of his favourite albums. Daniel Ash was interested in music at a young age, first being impressed by the stomping of the Dave Clark Five's "Bits and Pieces" song and later going through his older brother's music collection of records from the Beatles, the Rolling Stones, Faces and the Kinks. The first record he bought was Dave and Ansell Collins' "Double Barrel". When Ash was asked about how he developed his playing style and guitar influences, he replied: "My style of playing comes from a mixture of extreme laziness to learn proper scales/chords and a burning desire to sound original and new. Although I am a huge fan of Hendrix and Mick Ronson, Robert Fripp on Bowie tracks is also fab, and what about Earl Slick!" Ash also mentioned his appreciation of bands such as the Only Ones, the Damned, Television, Richard Hell and the Voidoids and said that the Stooges' Raw Power as one of his all-time favourite records. Kevin Haskins at 14 years old went to see Led Zeppelin and the drummer's (John Bonham) drum solo impressed him and called it "amazing". However at the same time, he was depressed as well due to feeling inadequate about his own musical abilities and never reaching the skill of Bonham. He even had thoughts of giving up music altogether. However, the nascent punk scene and seeing bands such as the Sex Pistols and the Clash gave him the confidence he needed to pursue in music.

Around 1970, David J was intrigued by the ska music, roots reggae and dub music coming out of Jamaica. He mentioned that reggae "...was the first music that I was seriously into." It was from this exposure from these musical styles that made David J choose a bass guitar instead of a lead guitar. David explained: "I loved [dub]. It was so exciting because it was my first exposure to this other world really. Something subterranean, dark, sexually charged, violent and compelling. This dark music was played in these dark places and was just captivating. I realised very quickly that what was powerful about this sound was the bass. I recalled that when we got guitars, no-one wanted to be the bass player – we had various bands just a bunch of friends who wanted to play pop music and they all wanted to play lead guitar – so I went; 'Well, I'll play the bass'. I retained my six string guitar and just played the bottom four strings and just used to play along with the records and work out the bass lines. I just got into it and found it really satisfying and saved up and bought a bass guitar."

Given their mixture of reggae and punk rock, Murphy said that musically, they were "more aligned to the Clash than anything else that was going around." When asked about the influence of reggae on Bauhaus' music, Murphy stated that it was "massive. We were listening to toasting music all the time, and David brought in a lot of bass lines that were very lead riffs ... those bass lines really formed the basis of the music" In particular, dub reggae was highly influential to the band, so far that David J mentioned that their signature song, "Bela Lugosi's Dead", was intended as dub.

The band members Daniel, David and Kevin once attended a Rastafarian event that became quite influential to their music. As David explained:

At the time, Northampton had a large Rastafarian population, centred around the Matta Fancanta Youth Movement, which had its base at the old Salvation Army Citadel on the corner of Sheep Street, just across from Derngate Bus Station. It was run by Trevor Hall, whose uncle had started the famed Count Shelly sound system, which Trevor inherited. They would hold monthly events featuring two outfits competing against each other, spinning dub plates—instrumental tracks direct from Jamaica—and blasting them over the huge speakers while their respective 'toasters' took turns freestyling over the top. They would really go to town, painting up the entire place in the red, green, and gold of the Ethiopian flag and wearing suits and outsized hats to match, while the women would dye their hair. There were quotations from Haile Selassie all around the walls, and the air was thick with ganja smoke and the gamey aroma of goat's head soup. It was a true 'temporary autonomous zone', to quote the anarchist writer and poet Hakim Bey, and the police would wisely keep their distance. Daniel, Kevin, and I would be the only white faces in the throng, but there was never any trouble—quite the opposite—and the amazing music that we heard in that place became a big influence on us, 'Bela Lugosi's Dead' being a good example.

The band's other musical influences included various forms of rock (garage, glam, art, electronic, prog, psychedelic, heavy metal, folk, experimental, krautrock), as well as avant-garde music, ambient music, traditional pop, disco and funk. Outside of music, Bauhaus's influences were often artistic and literary and included William S. Burroughs, Brion Gysin, Allen Ginsberg, Jack Kerouac, Bertolt Brecht, Arthur Rimbaud, Charles Baudelaire, Comte de Lautréamont, Jean Cocteau, André Breton, Surrealism, German Expressionism, Greek Mythology, Ingmar Bergman, David Lynch, Oscar Wilde, Franz Kafka and Antonin Artaud. In regards to the influence of the original Bauhaus movement on the band, Murphy stated that "Bauhaus had no influence on Bauhaus (the band) except for being the sound, shape, energetic, and sensory birth name of our group."

=== Sound ===
Bauhaus combined these influences to create a gloomy, earnest and introspective version of post-punk, which appealed to many music fans who felt disillusioned in the wake of punk's collapse. Its crucial elements included Murphy's deep and sonorous voice, Ash's jagged guitar playing and David J's dub-influenced bass. Their sound and gloomy style would eventually come to be known as gothic rock or simply "goth".

According to David J, the band were "...always keen not to be a traditional 'rock' band, and we would go to great pains to avoid that well-trodden road." They experimented with various techniques and methods for song composition such as the Exquisite corpse on tracks such as "1. David Jay 2. Peter Murphy 3. Kevin Haskins 4. Daniel Ash" along with the use of Brian Eno's Oblique Strategies cards. To achieve some of the sound effects in their songs, various instruments were implemented such as bottlenecks, echo units and a Syndrum.

In their second album Mask, expanded their sound with the addition of synthesizers, electronics and a saxophone to "add color and dynamics to each song." The album was less structured and more spontaneous compared to their first album. The song Of Lillies and Remains is an example of this method. According to Murphy: ""Of Lillies and Remains" is a song that was written as it happened. None of it was rehearsed, worked out or played beforehand. We simply told the engineer to turn on the tape. That was incredibly exciting. That said a lot for our confidence and courage and total absurdity; that it was possible to demonstrate that those ideas form an artistic point of view, come from another outside force – i.e. the collective creative thing." In an interview with John Robb, Ash mentioned that he bought an EBow in 1981.

=== Lyrics ===
In their first album and singles, Bauhaus' songs dealt with taboo subjects such as martyrdom, paranoia, madness, obsession and prostitution. For example, Shirley described the song "Stigmata Martyr" as about "a person whose religious obsession with Christ takes the form of a physical manifestation of the crucifixion; i.e. nail marks on the hands: 'In a crucifixion, ecstacy, Lying cross checked in agony, Stigmata bleed continuously, Holes in head, hands, feet, and weep for me.' When delivering these lyrics Peter became the stigmata." Murphy also commented on the misconceptions of the lyrics of the song: "I don't think the other members of the band really got what I was writing about, and the collective intention suddenly became very anti-religious. And that song is not an anti-religious song at all. The message is, really, the dangers of obsession, of almost psychosomatic induction of that masochism. That alone can be an illusion. And it's way off the mark as to the actual source of the message of any religious God. God doesn't want you to be in pain and die. It wasn't anti-religious. It wasn't demonic. It was alluding to the manifestation. Is it truly a mark of the Holy Ghost or is it simply an obsession condition? That's all there is to it." Another song, "Dark Entries", tells the story of title character Dorian Gray from Oscar Wilde's novel The Picture of Dorian Gray, which is Murphy's favourite novel. Murphy explains: "It was the first book with real substance that I chose for myself. It's a story of great narcissism and esoteric interior, and brilliantly written. It's a window into this personality, this Oscar Wilde chap I'd heard about. The language is so opulent. It's a rock star's story, really." The song "A God in an Alcove" was about "the story of a fallen idol." The track "In the Flat Field" was inspired by "the quotidian mundaneness of life in Northampton, and the desire to escape that 'flat' existence."

Other songs from later albums and singles, explored subjects such as nostalgia, desire, reflection, self-realization and hope. For example, the song "All We Ever Wanted Was Everything" was about the "...nostalgic memories of a time of innocence and naive yearning." Also, some of the song titles came from literary sources. For example, the song title "Kick in the Eye" was based on a line from the novel Satori in Paris by Jack Kerouac.

The construction of their lyrics were inspired by the cut-up technique method. An example of their approach to lyric structure is the amalgamation of individual lyrics from each member in the song "Of Lillies and Remains", as Murphy explained: "I'd written a dream out on a piece of paper and Dave picked up this piece of paper at random and found a blank side and wrote out a lyric. He turned it over and asked what it was. I said, "It's a dream." And so he said: "Let's do this." So David went in to do his half – no rehearsal – and then I took it from where he left off. That was a typical way of working."

=== Live performances ===
In terms of live performances, Bauhaus' stage theatrics, specifically their lighting, was inspired by a Judas Priest concert that Murphy attended with Bauhaus' manager. They predominantly used black and white lighting for their live shows. When they were asked why in early interviews, David J responded, "...coloured lights are for Christmas trees." Their lighting was so minimal that sometimes the band would play in almost complete darkness where they were glimpsed rather than seen in their shows. Their manager Graham Bentley helped with the lighting, "I started doing lights for Bauhaus – which obviously came about because I was the person who was there – I got into it very much from the start. I love the shadows. I used to call it a dark show rather than a light show. The essential emphasis was less light." Bentley used industrial lights for the lighting and put the lights on the floor rather than the ceiling. Also, a strobe light would be used for Murphy to hold on to his body and move around with it on stage.

== Legacy and influence ==
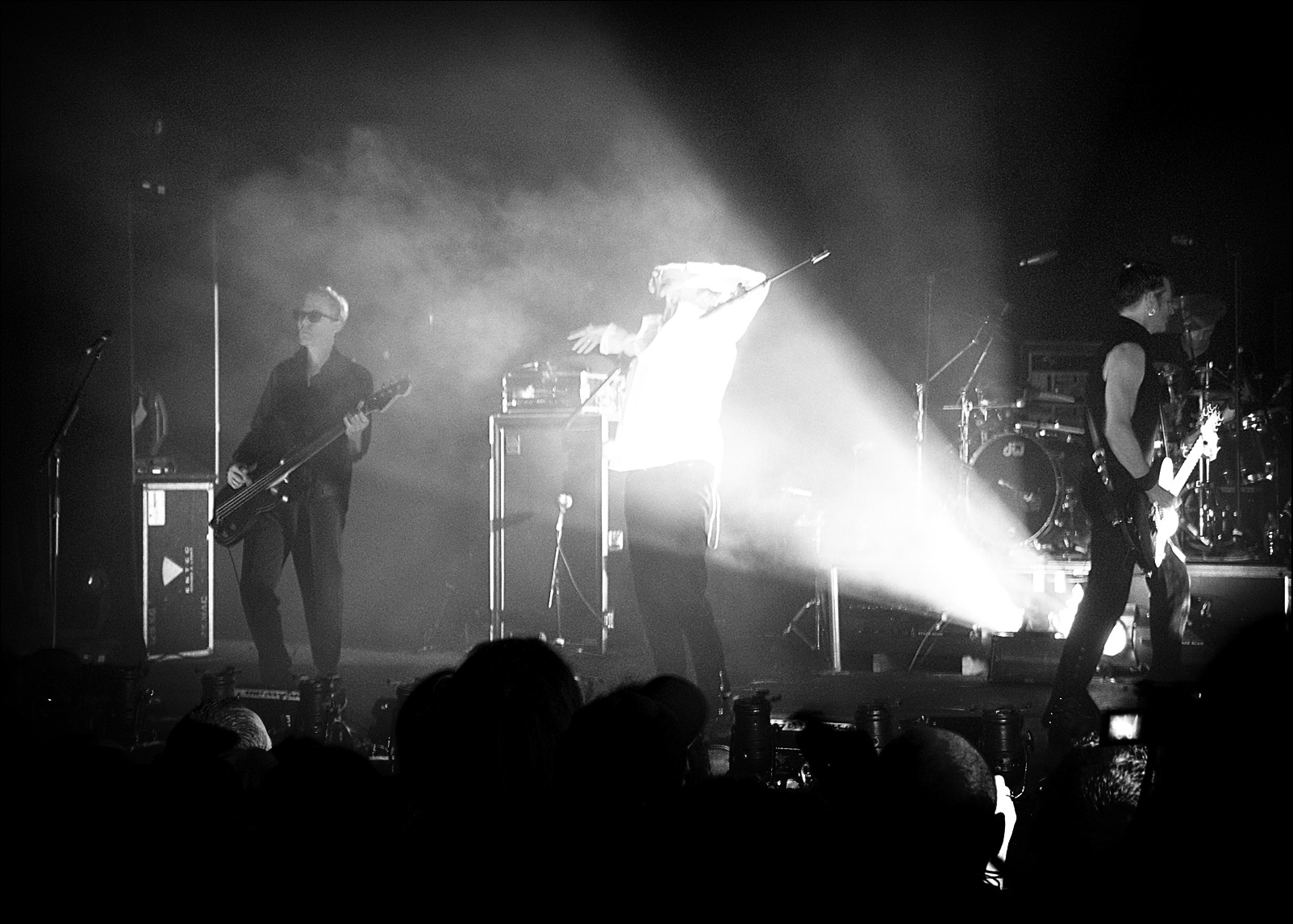
Brixton Academy in London, England, 3 February 2006

Bauhaus are frequently considered to be the inventors of goth; however, the band rejected this label, preferring to describe their style as "dark glam". Ash nevertheless admitted: "if you wear black and your first single is "Bela Lugosi's Dead", you've pretty much got a stamp on you. That's always been one of our strongest songs, so it's sort of undeniable".

Various bands and artists with goth associations pointed to Bauhaus as an inspiration, including Type O Negative, Alien Sex Fiend, Zola Jesus, Deine Lakaien, AFI, Buck-Tick, Lycia, Jaz Coleman (of Killing Joke), the Cult, Glenn Danzig (of Misfits), Greg Mackintosh (of Paradise Lost), She Wants Revenge, the Dresden Dolls, Soul Merchants, She Past Away and Wolfsheim. The Mission's Wayne Hussey even sang with Murphy on stage in 2013. Bauhaus were also influential upon many industrial rock groups and artists, like Ministry, Marilyn Manson, Nine Inch Nails, Nitzer Ebb, and Skinny Puppy.

In addition, Bauhaus were hailed by various alternative/indie rock performers and groups, including the Flaming Lips, Steve Albini (of Big Black), Jehnny Beth of Savages, Stephen Malkmus (of Pavement), Alan Sparhawk (of Low), Bradford Cox (of Deerhunter), Mark Lanegan (of Screaming Trees), Jesse Hughes (of the Eagles of Death Metal), Courtney Taylor-Taylor (of the Dandy Warhols), Jeff Ament (of Pearl Jam), Alex Henry Foster (of Your Favorite Enemies), Nicholas Thorburn (of Islands), Matt Noveskey (of Blue October), Jane's Addiction, Soundgarden, the Smashing Pumpkins, A Neon Rome, ...And You Will Know Us by the Trail of Dead, Hole, whose lead singer Courtney Love admitted that a lot of her songs are "complete Bauhaus rip-offs", Interpol, My Chemical Romance, the Twilight Sad, Shearwater, and Elliott Smith.

The group have been namechecked by several other prominent musical acts from other genres, including Jello Biafra (of the Dead Kennedys), Jonathan Davis (of Korn), the extreme metal band Celtic Frost, the lo-fi musician Ariel Pink, Maynard James Keenan (from Tool), electronic act Carl Craig, American record producer DJ Premier (of Gang Starr), the American comedian/musician Reggie Watts, the Iranian musician Azam Ali, the Japanese Visual kei musician Hide (of X Japan), the Japanese post-rock Mono, the Japanese heavy metal band Dir En Grey, whose lead singer Kyo listed Press the Eject and Give Me the Tape as his top record he would take to a desert island, the electronica act Moby, the trip hop band Massive Attack, the crust punk band Amebix, the shoegaze band Drop Nineteens, the psychedelic rock band White Hills, the noise rock band Today Is the Day, the nu metal band Coal Chamber, the extreme metal band Behemoth, the grindcore band Napalm Death, Randy Blythe (of Lamb of God), Fred Durst (of Limp Bizkit), Serj Tankian (of System of a Down), Sean Yseult (of White Zombie), Bilinda Butcher (of My Bloody Valentine), Stuart Braithwaite (of Mogwai) Blink-182 namedropped Bauhaus on their song "She's Out of Her Mind" on their California album. Duff McKagan of Guns N' Roses listed the Bauhaus compilation Bauhaus 1979–1983 in his 100 favorite albums list.

Alternative Press included Bauhaus in its 1996 list of "100 underground inspirations of the past 20 years".

The Bauhaus song "All We Ever Wanted Was Everything" (from The Sky's Gone Out) was covered by several artists and bands, including John Frusciante (guitarist of the Red Hot Chili Peppers), MGMT and Xiu Xiu (who recorded it in 2006 for their Tu mi piaci EP). Billy Corgan of the Smashing Pumpkins sang T. Rex's "Telegram Sam" and "All We Ever Wanted Was Everything" live on stage with Bauhaus in 1998. "Double Dare" was covered by the alternative rock band the God Machine. "Hollow Hills" was covered by System of a Down. "Silent Hedges" (along with "Double Dare") was covered by the power metal band Nevermore.

"Bela Lugosi's Dead", was covered by numerous acts, including Until December (1986), the Electric Hellfire Club (1996), Opera IX (on 2000 album The Black Opera: Symphoniæ Mysteriorum in Laudem Tenebrarum), Sepultura (on 2001 album Nation), Nouvelle Vague (on 2006 album Bande à part), Chris Cornell (2007), Nine Inch Nails (2009), Trent Reznor with Murphy and TV on the Radio (2013), Massive Attack (2013), David J with Jill Tracy (2013), Chvrches (for the 2014 Vampire Academy soundtrack), Dead Cross (on their 2017 debut album), the Damned (2019).

=== Cultural references ===
Bauhaus's fanbase extends beyond music; the American novelist Chuck Palahniuk was influenced by "Bela Lugosi's Dead" when writing his 2005 novel Haunted. In James O'Barr's 1989 comic book The Crow, the facial features of Eric Draven were based on those of Peter Murphy. In Neil Gaiman's series The Sandman, Dream's face and appearance were also based on Murphy. Additionally, comic book writer Alan Moore wrote the sleeve notes of Mask and contributed an anonymous Bauhaus review called "Phantoms of the Teenage Opera" to the UK music paper Sounds.

The 1984 music video of the song "You're the Inspiration" from the American band Chicago featured lead singer Peter Cetera wearing a Bauhaus T-shirt.

In an interview at the CBGB, Axl Rose from Guns N' Roses is seen wearing a Bauhaus T-shirt. In the Beavis and Butt-head season 3 episode "Meet God, Part II" (1993), they view and comment on a music video for Bauhaus' Bowie cover, "Ziggy Stardust". Susie Lewis, the co-creator of the American animated series Daria, is a fan of the band and used their song "1. David Jay 2. Peter Murphy 3. Kevin Haskins 4. Daniel Ash" in the closing credits of episode 213, "Write Where it Hurts". In the 2003 South Park episode "Raisins", Henrietta Biggle (one of the "goth kids") had a bedroom poster of "Blauhaus", a parody version of the band.

In the 2015–2016 American Horror Story season "American Horror Story: Hotel", "Bela Lugosi's Dead" is used in the opening episode, in line with the underlying horror/vampire theme of the series. In the 2017 The Americans episode "Darkroom", the Bauhaus song "Slice of Life" is played in the background of the red room scene. It was ranked number 8 in Vulture's list of "The 10 Best Musical Moments in The Americans". Saturday Night Live's recurring "Goth Talk" skit used "Bela Lugosi's Dead" as its theme song.

The 2016 single "She's Out of Her Mind" by American pop punk band Blink-182 describes a girl with "a black shirt, black skirt and Bauhaus stuck in her mind".

Bauhaus' performance at Coachella in 2005 has been ranked number 5 among LA Weekly as one of "The 20 Best Coachella Sets of All Time".

Bauhaus' appearance in the Tony Scott film The Hunger has been ranked number 20 by Rolling Stone as "The 30 Greatest Rock & Roll Movie Moments". and number 17 by Time Out as "The 50 Best Uses of Songs in Movies".

== Band members ==
=== Final lineup ===
- Daniel Ash – guitars, saxophone, backing and lead vocals (1978–1983, 1998, 2005–2008, 2019, 2022–2023)
- Peter Murphy – lead and backing vocals, acoustic guitar, keyboards, melodica, congas (1978–1983, 1998, 2005–2008, 2019, 2022–2023)
- Kevin Haskins – drums, percussion, keyboards, piano, backing vocals (1978–1983, 1998, 2005–2008, 2019, 2022–2023)
- David J – bass, keyboards, percussion, backing and lead vocals (1978–1983, 1998, 2005–2008, 2019, 2022–2023)

=== Former ===
- Chris Barber – bass (1978)

== Discography ==
Studio albums

- In the Flat Field (1980)
- Mask (1981)
- The Sky's Gone Out (1982)
- Burning from the Inside (1983)
- Go Away White (2008)
