= Kick in the Eye =

1981 song by Bauhaus

Single by Bauhaus

from the album Mask
- Released: 20 March 1981
- Length: 3:40
- Label: Beggars Banquet
- Songwriters: Daniel Ash; Kevin Michael Dompe; David John Haskins; Peter Murphy
- Producer: Bauhaus

Bauhaus singles chronology
"Telegram Sam" (1980)	"Kick in the Eye" (1981)	"The Passion of Lovers" (1981)

Kick in the Eye (Searching for Satori E.P.)

EP by Bauhaus
- Released: February 1982
- Length: 9:23 (7"); 12:15 (12"); 13:17 (12" MP)
- Label: Beggars Banquet
- Producer: Bauhaus

EP chronology
Mask (1981)	Kick in the Eye (Searching for Satori E.P.) (1982)	The Sky's Gone Out (1982)

"Kick in the Eye" is a song by English gothic rock band Bauhaus. It was released in 1981 as one of two singles released along their second studio album, Mask (1981) and was released the following year as an EP titled Kick in the Eye (Searching for Satori E.P.).

== Release ==
"Kick in the Eye" was released on 20 March 1981 as a single from the band's second studio album, Mask (1981). It reached number 59 in the UK Singles Chart.

"Kick in the Eye" was rereleased in February 1982 in EP form, titled Kick in the Eye (Searching for Satori E.P.). This version contains an audibly different mix, where the guitar is significantly louder. The EP reached number 45 in the same chart.

== Track listing ==
All tracks written by Bauhaus.

7" single

1. "Kick in the Eye"
2. "Satori"

=== Kick in the Eye (Searching for Satori E.P.) ===
7"

1. "Kick in the Eye (Searching for Satori)" – 3:31
2. "Harry" – 2:39
3. "Earwax" – 3:13

12"

1. "Kick in the Eye (Searching for Satori)" – 3:31
2. "In Fear of Dub" – 2:52
3. "Harry" – 2:39
4. "Earwax" – 3:13

Note: A rare misprint of the 12" exists, including "Poison Pen" instead of "In Fear Of Dub". This rare 12" is only identifiable via listening, as the sleeve and vinyl are identical to the normal version.

== Personnel ==
Bauhaus

- David J – bass guitar, backing vocals, production
- Kevin Haskins – drums, percussion, production
- Daniel Ash – guitar, backing vocals, production
- Peter Murphy – lead vocals, production
