= Wild Birds: 1985–1995 =

Wild Birds 1985-1995: The Best of the Beggars Banquet Years

Greatest hits album by Peter Murphy
- Released: 22 February 2000
- Recorded: 1985–1995
- Genre: Alternative rock; gothic rock
- Length: 74:42
- Label: Beggars Banquet
- Producer: Pascal Gabriel; Howard Hughes; Gerry Kitchingham; Peter Murphy; Simon Rogers; Mike Thorne; Ivo Watts-Russell

Peter Murphy chronology
Cascade (1995)	Wild Birds 1985-1995: The Best of the Beggars Banquet Years (2000)	Dust (2002)

Professional ratings
Review scores
Source	Rating
AllMusic	4.5/5 stars
Pitchfork	6.0/10

Wild Birds: 1985–1995 is a compilation album of Peter Murphy's songs that was released in 2000.

== Track listing ==
1. "Cuts You Up" (Edit) (4:57)
2. "Subway" (4:36)
3. "The Scarlet Thing in You" (4:18)
4. "Indigo Eyes" (Edit) (4:09)
5. "Keep Me from Harm" (Edit) (4:01)
6. "Final Solution" (3:56)
7. "Deep Ocean Vast Sea" (4:08)
8. "Strange Kind of Love" (3:47)
9. "Hit Song" (Single Edit) (4:44)
10. "Huuvola" (5:51)
11. "All Night Long" (Single Edit) (4:37)
12. "Dragnet Drag" (Edit) (5:03)
13. "I'll Fall With Your Knife" (4:25)
14. "The Sweetest Drop" (4:16)
15. "Roll Call" (6:34)
16. "Jemal" (Version 2) (5:32)
