= B-Movie (band) =

English new wave band

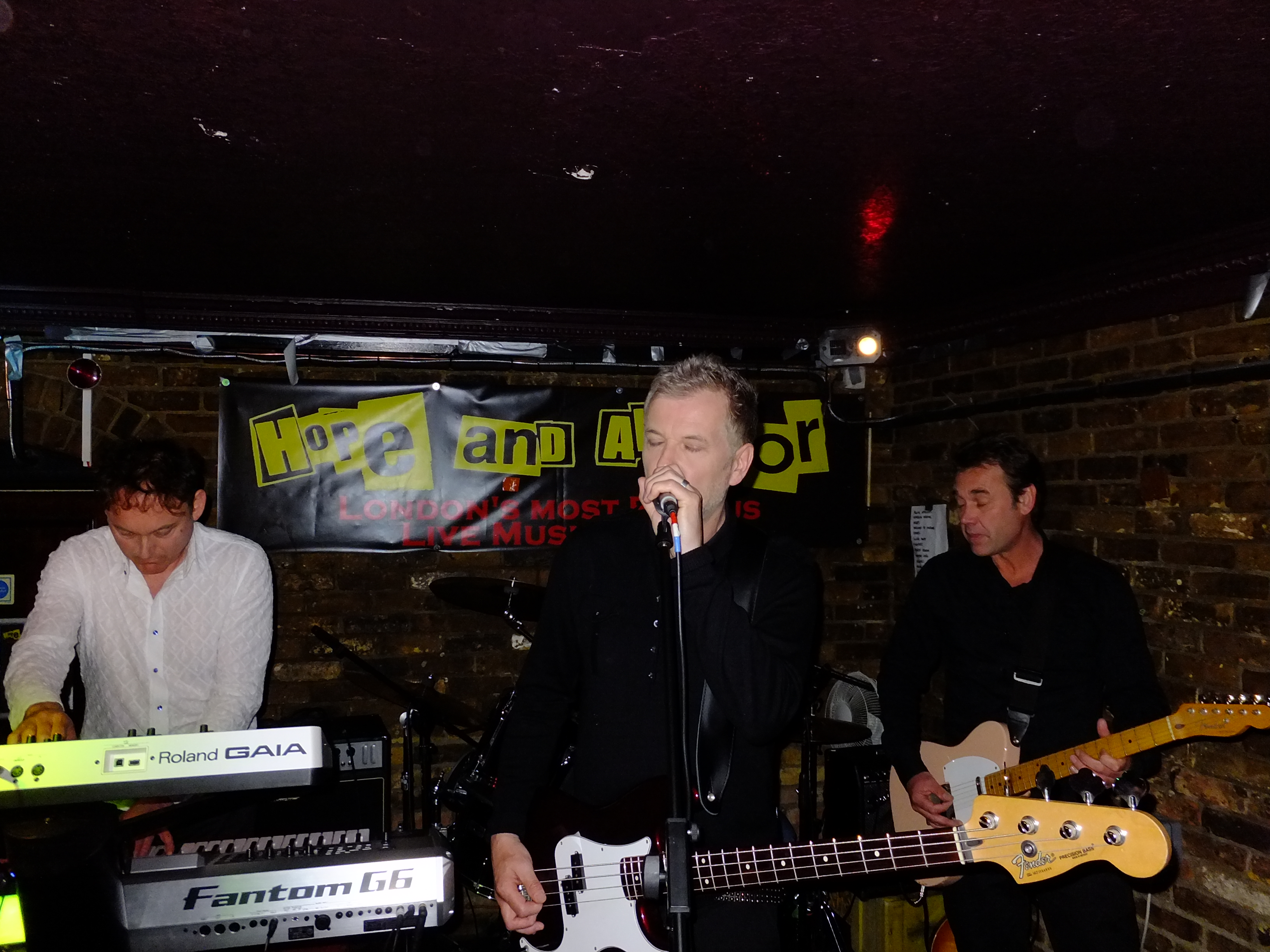
- B-Movie performing at Hope and Anchor in London, 2013

Background information
- Origin: Mansfield, England
- Genres: Synth-pop; post-punk; new wave
- Years active: 1979–1985; 2006; 2011–present
- Labels: Some Bizzare; Dead Good; Deram; Sire; Wax; No Emb Blanc; Cherry Red; Warner Platinum; Loki
- Members: Steve Hovington; Paul Statham; Graham Boffey; Rick Holliday
- Past members: Al Cash; Adi Hardy; Mike Peden; Martin Winter (aka Smedley)

B-Movie are a new wave band from Mansfield, England, initially active in the first half of the 1980s.

== History ==
The band's original line-up included lead vocalist and bassist Steve Hovington, guitarist Paul Statham, keyboardist Rick Holliday and drummer Graham Boffey. Musical influences included Ultravox, The Cure, Wire, The Only Ones, OMD, David Bowie and Brian Eno. Over time, the band absorbed additional influences such as The Doors, Hawkwind and early Pink Floyd.

B-Movie's initial 1980 EP releases, the Take Three 7-inch and Nowhere Girl 12-inch, were issued on the small UK indie label Dead Good Records. They were eventually signed to the Some Bizzare label, and their song "Moles" was featured on the original 1981 Some Bizzare Album.

In 1981, B-Movie signed with Phonogram imprint Deram, and had their biggest UK commercial success with the single "Remembrance Day", which reached No. 61 on the UK Singles Chart. The follow-up single, "Marilyn Dreams", failed to chart.

In 1982, they re-released "Nowhere Girl" as a single, which reached No. 67 in the UK, but there was no immediate follow-up or studio album.

A revolving door of members started at this point. Drummer Boffey left and was replaced by Andy Johnson, while Martin Winter (aka Smedley) joined on bass. Next, Holliday left in 1983 to form Six Sed Red with Soft Cell associate Cindy Ecstasy (their biggest success came when Six Sed Red's song "Dream Baby" was covered by Bananarama on that band's 1984 eponymous studio album). Statham switched from guitar to keyboards and was briefly replaced by Stuart McLean (Charming Snakes) for a tour of Israel. B-Movie then resurfaced in early 1984 (with Al Cash on drums) with the single "A Letter from Afar", produced by John "Jellybean" Benitez but it only reached No. 81 on the UK Singles Chart. Cash then left, leaving B-Movie as a three piece of Hovington, Statham and Winter augmented by session players.

Towards the end of 1985, they finally released a studio album on Sire Records called Forever Running, containing re-recorded versions of their two hits, but both it and the single "Switch On – Switch Off" were flops despite a tour to promote them. The band broke up soon after.

Frontman Hovington formed a band called One in the late 1980s with Seven Webster and drummer Bob Thompson, releasing an album and two singles on Chrysalis. He later formed another band called Laughing Gas, releasing one 7-inch single.

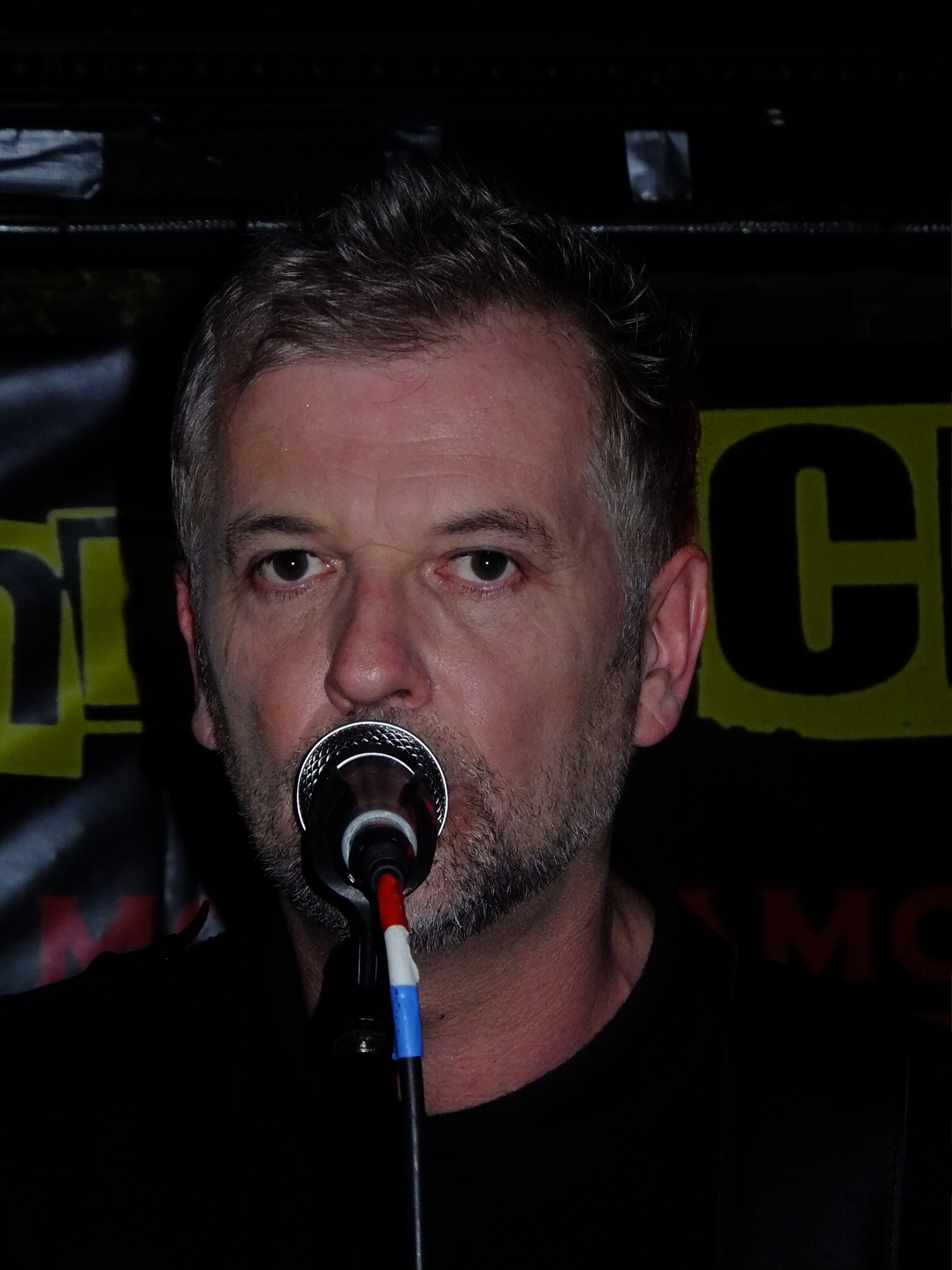
B-Movie performing at Hope and Anchor in London, 2013

After his departure, Boffey joined Slaughterhouse 5, releasing two singles, "Pathetic Girlfriend" and "Things She Did", and a studio album, Wide Open on IRS. After this venture, Boffey and Davy Lawrence formed Enormous.

Guitarist Statham collaborated with ex-Bauhaus lead vocalist Peter Murphy, successfully participating as part of Murphy's solo backing band, the Hundred Men. He co-wrote and performed on Murphy's solo studio albums Love Hysteria (1988) and Deep (1990). He co-wrote Dido's first single "Here with Me", which became an international hit single, and also the title track of her debut studio album No Angel (2001), which has sold almost 20 million copies. Statham also co-wrote several songs, including "Return of the King", on Simple Minds lead vocalist Jim Kerr's first solo studio album, Lostboy! AKA Jim Kerr.

After a long hiatus, B-Movie reformed and played one-off shows in October 2004 (with the original line-up) and March 2006 (featuring Hovington and Statham) at The Metro nightclub in London, followed by additional one-off shows from the original line-up in Mansfield, Nottingham, London and Germany.

In 2012, they digitally released the track Echoes, their first new release in 22 years. This was followed in 2013 by the Distant Skies EP and The Age of Illusion album, both available digitally and on CD. The band played a short tour in June 2013, visiting Portsmouth, Cambridge, London and Nottingham.

Their third studio album, Climate of Fear, was released on 18 March 2016. It included new material as well as a re-recorded version of "Nowhere Girl".

On 23 July 2018, B-Movie previewed two tracks from the forthcoming Take 2 EP on Statham's label Loki Records.

== Discography ==
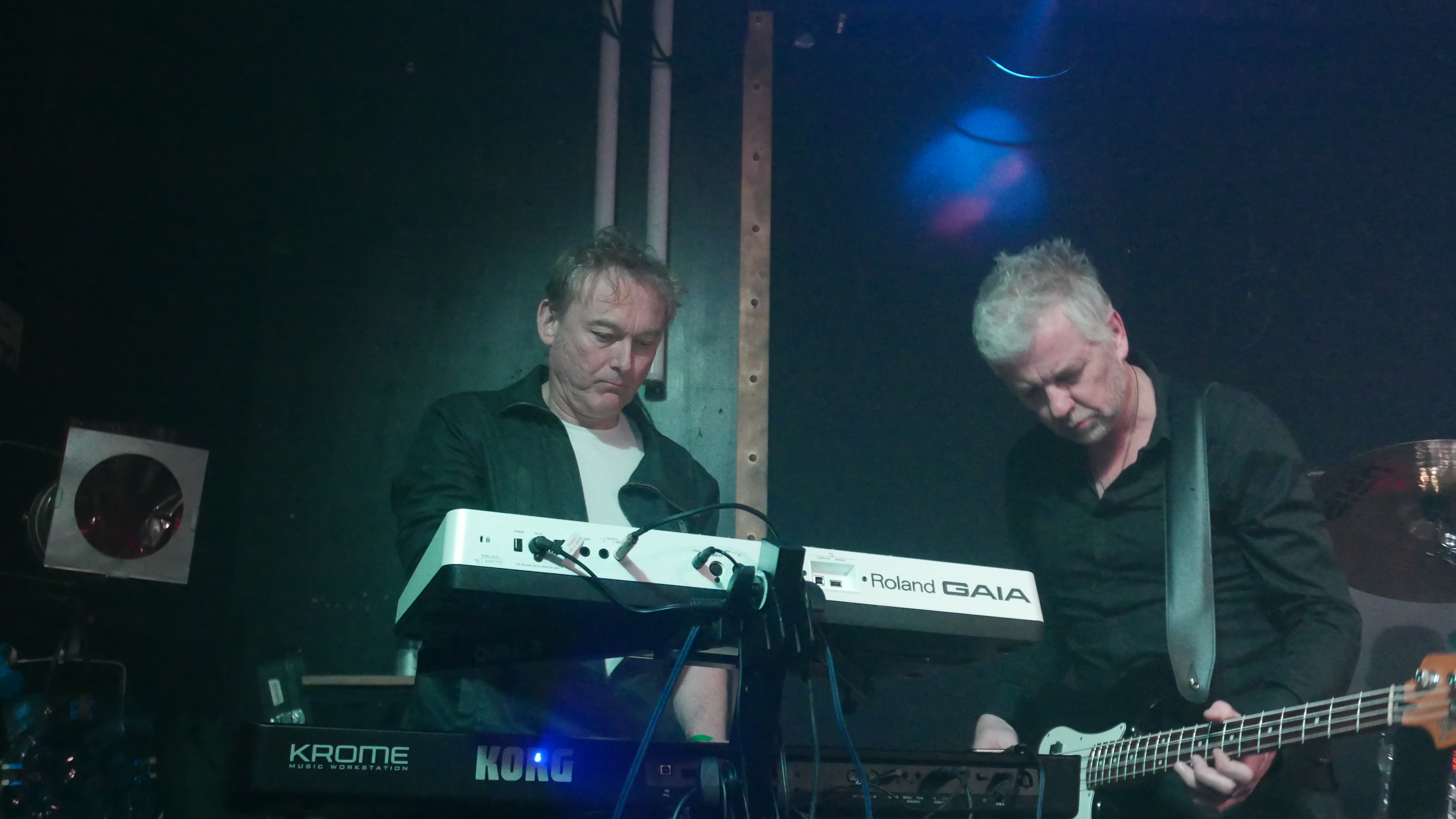
B-Movie performing at Electrowerkz in London, 2015

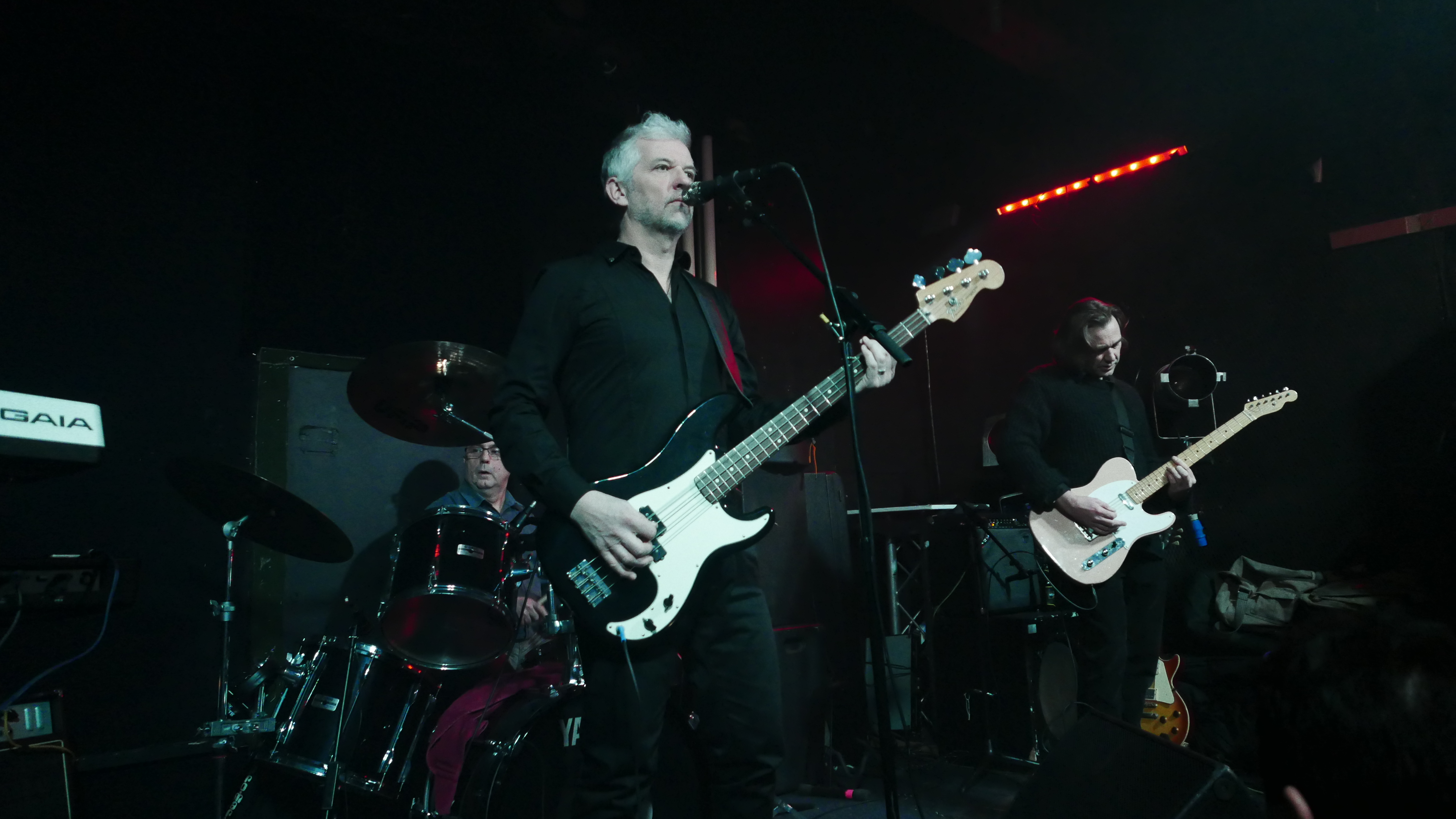
B-Movie performing at Electrowerkz in London, 2015

Studio albums

- Forever Running (1985, Sire Records)
- The Age of Illusion (2013, No Emb Blanc)
- Climate of Fear (2016, No Emb Blanc)
- Hidden Treasures (2025, Wanderlust)

Singles and EPs

- Take Three 7-inch EP (1980, Dead Good Records)
- Nowhere Girl 12-inch EP (1980, Dead Good Records)
- "Remembrance Day" (1981, Some Bizzare/Deram) UK No. 61
- "Marilyn Dreams" (1982, Some Bizzare/Sire)
- "Nowhere Girl" (re-release) (1982, Some Bizzare) UK No. 67
- "A Letter from Afar" (1985, Sire)
- "Switch On – Switch Off" (1985, Sire)
- "Polar Opposites" (1989, Wax Records)
- Distant Skies EP (2013, No Emb Blanc)
- Demo 7-inch single (2015, Vinyl Revival)
- Take 2 EP (2018, Loki Records)

Compilation albums

- The Dead Good Tapes (1988, Wax Records)
- Volume 1 – Remembrance Days (1995, Dead Good Records)
- Volume 2 – Radio Days (1995, Dead Good Records)
- Remembrance Days – The Dead Good Years (1997, Cherry Red)
- BBC Radio Sessions 1981–84 (2001, Cherry Red)
- The Platinum Collection (2006, Warner Platinum Records)

Compilation appearances

- "Man on a Threshold" and "Refugee" on East (1980, Dead Good Records)
- "Moles" on Some Bizzare Album (1981, Some Bizzare)
- "Nostalgia" on Generation Blitz: Concrete and Chrome (2022, State of Bass)

== Sources ==
- Sutton, Michael. "B-Movie". AllMusic.
