= Lion (Peter Murphy album) =

Studio album by Peter Murphy
- Released: 2 June 2014
- Genres: Alternative rock, gothic rock, industrial rock
- Length: 56:10
- Label: Nettwerk
- Producer: Youth

Peter Murphy chronology
Ninth (2011)	Lion (2014)	Silver Shade (2025)

Singles from Peter Murphy
- 1. "Hang Up" Released: 8 April 2014

Lion is the tenth solo album by English musician Peter Murphy. It was released on 2 June 2014 in the United Kingdom and 3 June 2014 in the United States through Nettwerk Records. The album was produced by Killing Joke bassist Youth alias Martin Glover.

A teaser trailer for the album was released on 27 March 2014. The track "Hang Up" was released as a single on 8 April 2014 and was accompanied by a music video. The remixed version track was also released as limited 7" Record Store Day single, with the b-side track "I’m On Your Side". Murphy embarked a North American tour in 2014 in support of the album.

It was his first album to chart on the US Billboard 200 since his 1992 album, Holy Smoke.

== Background ==
The album is a product of sessions with Youth, with whom Murphy got together "just to see how it went." Murphy described the album as "a mixture of stuff, almost like operas for the dispossessed" and "romantic and very deep and emotional, quite symphonic in places." He also further stated:

"It's a mixture of 'The White Album,' which goes into 'Helter Skelter,' and kind of 'I Am the Walrus' type of arrangement stuff. It's a lot — kind of like, 'Who is that person? How can he imagine he can do all that?' I just think I'm out of place, really. I'm like Bowie, Iggy, Frank Sinatra, Elvis all rolled into one, and it's kind of like, 'What planet did he come from?"

The album was recorded in a rapid manner, with songs improvised. Murphy wondered if he would be able to replicate the performances while on tour:

"The songs are all in a high register — so now I have to learn to sing that way. I keep asking, 'My God, how did I get that high? How do I get that high again, and how do I sustain it for an hour?'"

== Track listing ==
1. "Hang Up" – 5:44
2. "I Am My Own Name" – 5:46
3. "Low Tar Stars" – 4:12
4. "I’m On Your Side" – 5:29
5. "Compression" – 6:12
6. "Holy Clown" – 4:14
7. "The Rose" – 3:36
8. "The Ghost of Shokan Lake" – 6:28
9. "Eliza" – 3:23
10. "Loctaine" – 6:25
11. "Lion" – 4:41

== Release history ==
Country	Date	Label
United Kingdom	2 June 2014	Loma Vista/Nettwerk Records
United States	3 June 2014	Loma Vista/Nettwerk Records

== Personnel ==
- Peter Murphy - vocals
- Eddie Banda - drums, keyboards, programming, engineering, mixing
- Martin Destroyer - guitar (track 4)
- Pavan Sharda - guitar (track 5)
- Michael Rendall - keyboards, programming, engineering, mixing
- Youth - bass guitar, guitar, keyboards, programming, production, mixing
- Emilio DiZefalo - violin
