= You're So Close =

Single by Peter Murphy

from the album Holy Smoke
- Released: 06/1992
- Genre: Alternative rock, gothic rock
- Length: 5:31
- Label: Beggars Banquet, RCA
- Songwriter(s): Peter Murphy and Paul Statham
- Producer(s): Mike Thorne, Peter Murphy

Peter Murphy singles chronology
"The Sweetest Drop" (1992)	"You're So Close" (1992)	"Hit Song" (1992)

"You're So Close" is a song by English musician Peter Murphy, from his fourth solo studio album Holy Smoke (1992). Written by Murphy and Paul Statham, the song was released in 1992 as the second single from the album, through Beggars Banquet and RCA Records. Despite not matching with the success of the lead single off the album, "The Sweetest Drop", the song charted on Billboard Modern Rock Tracks, peaking at number 18.

== Music ==
The song starts with a low, ascending keyboard loop and understated bassline. The chorus, which was described to have "a jaw-dropping impact" comes through the overdub of Murphy's "almost conversational lead lyrics" and his crooning, crying backing vocals. After the second chorus, the song returns to the "calm style of the opening", before returning for one last verse and extended chorus.

== Critical reception ==
In his review for Holy Smoke, Ned Raggett of Allmusic praised the song's "anthemic, stunning chorus and a flat-out brilliant vocal." In his separate track review, Raggett described the song as "a sleeper hit of sorts from Holy Smoke" and "a note-perfect combination of righteous rock energy and often astonishing beauty." He also criticized the fact that the song wasn't the lead single, stating: "Quite why this didn't surface as the lead single instead of "The Sweetest Drop" will have to remain a mystery for the gods to deduce." High Fidelity News noted the song's "sinister crawl", interpreting that the song "suggest a man who is finally finding his own musical identity." Dave Thompson, the author of The Dark Reign of Gothic Rock: In the Reptile House with the Sisters of Mercy, Bauhaus and The Cure, described the song as "claustrophobic."

== Track listing ==
U.S. maxi single
No.	Title	Length
1.	"You're So Close"	5:31
2.	"Line Between The Devil's Teeth (And That Which Cannot Be Repeat) (Live)"	5:34
3.	"Cuts You Up (Live)"	6:51
4.	"All Night Long (Live)"	5:10

UK and Germany CD
No.	Title	Length
1.	"You're So Close"	5:31
2.	"The Sweetest Drop (Edit)"	4:17
3.	"Cuts You Up (Live)"	6:51
4.	"All Night Long (Live)"	5:10

== Personnel ==
- Peter Murphy – vocals, production, composition, guitar (6); keyboards (7)

The Hundred Men

- Terl Bryant – drums, percussion
- Eddie Branch – bass
- Peter Bonas – guitar, acoustic guitar

Other personnel

- Mike Thorne – production, synclavier
- Jason Appleton – production assistant
- Jack Skinner – mastering
- Fernando Kral – engineering, mixing
- Stuart Every – assistant engineer
- Laura Janisse – production assistant

== Chart performances ==
Chart (1992)	Peak position
US Billboard Modern Rock Tracks	18
