= Holy Smoke (Peter Murphy album) =

Studio album by Peter Murphy
- Released: 14 April 1992
- Recorded: Maison Rouge Studios, London; The Stereo Society, New York
- Genre: Alternative rock, gothic rock, art rock
- Length: 48:46
- Label: Beggars Banquet
- Producer: Mike Thorne, Peter Murphy

Peter Murphy chronology
Deep (1989)	Holy Smoke (1992)	Cascade (1995)

Singles from Peter Murphy
- 1. "You're So Close" Released: 1992; 2. "The Sweetest Drop" Released: 1992; 3. "Hit Song" Released: 1992

Professional ratings
Review scores
Source	Rating
Allmusic	2.5/5 stars
Entertainment Weekly	B

Holy Smoke is the fourth solo studio album by English musician Peter Murphy. It was released on 14 April 1992 through Beggars Banquet Records. Produced by Mike Thorne, the album features contributions from Alison Limerick, Jonathan Carney, Audrey Riley and The Hundred Men, his backing band since 1988's Love Hysteria album.

Although the album didn't meet with the commercial success of its predecessor, Deep (1990), it peaked at number 108 on Billboard 200 chart. The lead single off the album, "The Sweetest Drop", peaked at number 2 on Billboard Modern Rock Tracks chart.

== Critical reception ==
Ned Raggett of AllMusic was mixed in his assessment of the album. He stated: "Released in the initial craze of the grunge/alternative mega-crossover, Smoke's elegant ballads and angular, arty rockers simply didn't fit in." Nevertheless, he also described the album as "quite a strong release, due to "avoiding any cloning of Deep or "Cuts You Up" in favor of a different approach meant to bring out the band's live power more directly." He also praised Mike Thorne's production work, commenting that it gives the album "a crisp, solid punch throughout, even during its quieter moments." Bill Wyman of Entertainment Weekly also praised the albums "sophisticated" production, calling it as "lush and very adult." He also wrote: "When the music and lyrics come together, it's almost touching, as on the sardonically named "Hit Song", which sounds to me like a vampire pleading for his mortality back."

== Track listing ==
All tracks are written by Peter Murphy and Paul Statham except where noted

No.	Title	Writer(s)	Length
1.	"Keep Me From Harm"		4:26
2.	"Kill the Hate"	Murphy	4:48
3.	"You're So Close"		5:30
4.	"The Sweetest Drop"		6:55
5.	"Low Room"	Murphy, Eddie Branch, Peter Bonas, Terl Bryant	4:23
6.	"Let Me Love You"	Murphy	3:33
7.	"Our Secret Garden"	Murphy	5:46
8.	"Dream Gone By"		6:05
9.	"Hit Song"	Murphy, The Hundred Men	5:32
10.	Untitled (hidden track)		0:48
Total length:			48:46

== Personnel ==
- Peter Murphy – vocals, production, composition, guitar (6); keyboards (7)

The Hundred Men

- Terl Bryant – drums, percussion
- Eddie Branch – bass
- Paul Statham – bass (6); acoustic guitar (7); keyboards
- Peter Bonas – guitar, acoustic guitar

Additional musicians

- Gini Ball – strings (9)
- Jonathan Carney – strings (9)
- Zoe Caryl – backing vocals (4, 9)
- Alison Limerick – vocals (4, 9)
- Chris Pitsillides – strings (9)
- Audrey Riley – strings (9)
- Rick Shaffer – guitar (5, 8)
- John Vartan – ney (1); zurna (1); tambura (7)

Other personnel

- Mike Thorne – production, synclavier
- Jason Appleton – production assistant
- Jack Skinner – mastering
- Fernando Kral – engineering, mixing
- Anton Corbijn – photography
- Stuart Every – assistant engineer
- Laura Janisse – production assistant

== Chart positions ==
Album

Chart (1992)	Peak position
US Billboard 200	108

Singles

Year	Song	Chart	Peak position
1992	"You're So Close"	Modern Rock Tracks	18
1992	"The Sweetest Drop"	Modern Rock Tracks	2
