= Should the World Fail to Fall Apart =

Studio album by Peter Murphy
- Released: July 1986
- Recorded: 1986
- Studios: Blackwing Studios, London; RG Jones, London
- Genre: Alternative rock
- Length: 53:00
- Labels: RCA, Beggars Banquet
- Producers: Ivo Watts-Russell, Peter Murphy, Howard Hughes, Gerry Kitchingham

Peter Murphy chronology
Should the World Fail to Fall Apart (1986)	Love Hysteria (1988)

Singles from Should the World Fail to Fall Apart
- 1. "Final Solution" Released: 1985; 2. "Blue Heart" Released: 1986; 3. "Tale of the Tongue" Released: 1986

Professional ratings
Review scores
Source	Rating
AllMusic	4/5 stars
The Encyclopedia of Popular Music	2/5 stars
MusicHound Rock: The Essential Album Guide	4/5 stars

Should the World Fail to Fall Apart is the debut album by the British solo artist Peter Murphy, formerly of the gothic rock band Bauhaus. The album contains Murphy's covers of Magazine's "The Light Pours Out of Me" and Pere Ubu's "Final Solution." It was released in 1986.

== Production ==
Many guest musicians appear on the album, including Howard Hughes and John McGeoch.

== Critical reception ==
Trouser Press wrote: "If Murphy could remove the melodrama from his delivery, a lot of the songs might have been quite nice. But even at low volume and languorous tempo, he can’t shake the old goth theatrics out of his voice." The Spin Alternative Record Guide called the album "the least perfunctory" of Murphy's solo releases.

== Track listing ==
=== Original LP track listing ===
All tracks composed by Peter Murphy and Howard Hughes (Stephen Betts); except where indicated

1. "Canvas Beauty (Romance Version)"
2. "The Light Pours Out of Me" (Howard Devoto, Pete Shelley, John McGeoch)
3. "Confessions"
4. "Should the World Fail to Fall Apart"
5. "Never Man" (Peter Murphy)
6. "God Sends"
7. "Blue Heart"
8. "The Answer Is Clear"
9. "Final Solution" (David Thomas, Craig Bell)
10. "Jemal" (Peter Murphy)

=== Canadian LP track listing ===
The Canadian version of the LP, released on Vertigo/PolyGram, has a different cover as well an alternative track listing:

1. "Should the World Fail to Fall Apart"
2. "Never Man"
3. "Tale of the Tongue"
4. "God Sends"
5. "Blue Heart"
6. "The Answer Is Clear"
7. "Confessions
8. "Final Solution"
9. "Jemal"
10. "The Light Pours Out of Me"

In addition to reordering, the track "Canvas Beauty" was dropped in favor of "Tale of The Tongue", which had been released in the UK as a non-album single.

=== 2011 deluxe edition bonus CD ===
In July 2011, Cherry Red Records released a 25th anniversary deluxe edition of the album with a bonus disc of 13 B-sides and remixes:

1. "Canvas Beauty" (Fast Version)
2. "The Light Pours Out of Me" (Original version)
3. "Confessions" (Remix)
4. "Should the World Fail to Fall Apart" (Version 3)
5. "Stay"
6. "Tale of the Tongue" (12″ Version)
7. "Blue Heart" (12″ Version)
8. "The Answer Is Clear" (Version)
9. "Final Solution" (Club mix)
10. "Jemal" (Version 2)
11. "Should the World Fail to Fall Apart" (Unreleased version)
12. "Final Solution" (Full version)
13. "Final Solution" (Third and final mix)
- Track 1 released on Beggars Banquet 12″ EP SOVE 2359 (CA), 1986
- Track 2 released on a Various Artists sampler, 1985
- Tracks 3, 4 and 10 released on Beggars Banquet 12″ BEG 179T (U.K.), 1987
- Track 5 exact origin unknown
- Track 6 released on Beggars Banquet 12″ BEG 174T (U.K.), 1986
- Track 7 released on Beggars Banquet 12″ BEG 162T (U.K.), 1986
- Track 8 released on Beggars Banquet 7″ BEG 143 (U.K.), 1985
- Tracks 9 and 12 released on Beggars Banquet 12″ BEG 143T (U.K.), 1985
- Track 11 is a previously unreleased alternate mix
- Track 13 released on Beggars Banquet 12″ BEG 143TP (U.K.), 1985

== Personnel ==
- Peter Murphy - "naive" guitar, keyboards, drum programming, lead vocals, harmony vocals
- Howard Hughes - guitar, keyboards, backing vocals, drum programming, piano
- Chris Pye, John McGeoch, Peter Bonas, Philip Rambow, Steve Turner - guitar
- Daniel Ash - "manic" guitar
- Erkan Oğur - acoustic guitar, EBow
- Eddie Branch, Paul Cover - bass
- Steven Young - drum programming
- Martin McCarrick - cello
- Gini Bell - violin
- Joji Hirota - congas
- Jon Keleihor - "potty" percussion
- Paul Vincent Lawford - "complementary rhythms" percussion
- Jon Self - harmonica

Technical

- Gerry Kitchingham, John Fryer - engineer
- Carlos 'Sosa' - cover painting
