= Silver Shade =

Studio album by Peter Murphy
- Released: 9 May 2025
- Length: 57:22
- Label: Metropolis
- Producer: Youth

Peter Murphy chronology
Peter Live - Volume Two - Blender Theater At Gramercy NYC 2008 (2024)	Silver Shade (2025)

Singles from Silver Shade
- 1. "The Artroom Wonder" Released: 24 March 2025

Silver Shade is the tenth studio album by English musician Peter Murphy. It was released on 9 May 2025, by Metropolis Records. It is his first studio album in eleven years following the release of Lion in 2014.

Consisting of twelve songs, including collaborations with Trent Reznor, Boy George, Danny Carey and Justin Chancellor, the album features a total runtime of approximately fifty-seven minutes with each song averaging between three and seven minutes. It was produced by Killing Joke bassist Youth. The album's lead single, "The Artroom Wonder", was released on 24 March 2025.

== Reception ==
Professional ratings
Review scores
Source	Rating
Mojo	3/5 stars
Spill	4.5/5 stars
Under the Radar	6/10 stars

Victoria Segal of Mojo Magazine rated the album three stars and noted it "delivered with an enduring conviction and (off-message, perhaps) vitality." Spill Magazine assigned it a rating of four and a half out of five, describing it as "a brilliant album and a welcomed return from a friend who has been very missed." Under the Radar gave Silver Shade a rating of six out of ten, referring to it as "a noble effort and a pleasant enough listen, but one that is weighed down by its own dramatic inclinations." Spin remarked, "Silver Shade is what we can all hope to be at 67: imperfect, maybe expected, but also loud, lively, and unapologetically ourselves."

== Track listing ==
All tracks are written by Peter Murphy and Martin Glover, except where noted.

Silver Shade track listing
No.	Title	Writer(s)	Length
1.	"Swoon"		5:16
2.	"Hot Roy"		3:45
3.	"Sherpa"		3:32
4.	"Silver Shade"	Murphy; Paul Statham	4:07
5.	"The Artroom Wonder"		5:00
6.	"Meaning of My Life"		5:51
7.	"Xavier New Boy"		5:45
8.	"Cochita Is Lame"	Murphy; Kevin Haskins; Peter DiStefano; Eric Avery; Doug DeAngelis	4:29
9.	"Soothsayer"		3:27
10.	"Time Waits"	Murphy; Mark Mason	4:31
11.	"Sailmaker's Charm"		6:26
12.	"Let the Flowers Grow" (with Boy George)	Murphy; Boy George; Glover	5:13
Total length:			57:22

== Personnel ==
Credits adapted from the album's liner notes.

- Peter Murphy – vocals
- Youth – production, guitar (all tracks); bass (tracks 1–11)
- Michael Rendall – recording, mixing (all tracks); programming (tracks 3–12), synthesizer (3–7, 9–12), keyboards (5, 7, 9, 11), strings (6)
- Eddie Banda – engineering assistance (all tracks), synthesizer (tracks 1–4, 7, 8, 10, 12), drums (1–3, 5, 7–12), programming (1, 2, 4, 7, 8, 12), percussion (3, 11)
- Lore Young – engineering assistance
- Tim Debney – mastering
- Trent Reznor – vocals (tracks 1, 2, 4)
- Danny Carey – drums (tracks 4, 6), percussion (4)
- Justin Chancellor – bass (tracks 5–8, 11)
- Emilio DiZefalo – violin (track 6)
- Amir John Haddad – oud (tracks 7, 10–12), bouzouki (7, 10, 12), acoustic guitar (10, 11), handclaps (10), electric guitar (11, 12), flamenco guitar (12)
- Boy George – vocals (track 12)
- Tim Dawson – additional engineering (tracks 4, 6)
- Robert Hakalski – cover art, design
