= The Sweetest Drop =

Single by Peter Murphy

from the album Holy Smoke
- Released: 04/1992
- Genre: Alternative rock, gothic rock, art rock, new wave
- Length: 6:55
- Label: Beggars Banquet, RCA
- Songwriters: Peter Murphy, Paul Statham
- Producers: Mike Thorne, Peter Murphy

Peter Murphy singles chronology
"A Strange Kind of Love" (1990)	"The Sweetest Drop" (1992)	"You're So Close" (1992)

"The Sweetest Drop" is a song by English musician Peter Murphy, from his fourth solo studio album, Holy Smoke (1992). Written by Murphy and Paul Statham, the song was released as the lead single off the album in 1992, through Beggars Banquet and RCA Records. The album reached number 108 on the Billboard 200 chart, while the single peaked at number 2 on the Billboard Modern Rock Tracks chart.

A music video for the song was directed by Tim Pope.

== Music ==
The song builds the "miasmic" soundscapes over wall-of-sound proportions. The soundscapes are then followed by a chorus, which is described to be "rumbling in like a panzer division." The song then continues with pounding dance rhythms and muted wah-wah guitars, accompanied by the backing singers.

== Critical reception ==
In his album review for Holy Smoke, Ned Raggett of Allmusic stated that the track "You're So Close" would have been a better choice as a lead single. Nevertheless, another Allmusic critic Dave Thompson praised "The Sweetest Drop" in his separate track review, describing it as "the best Roxy Music song that Roxy Music never performed." He stated that the song "drifts in gently to echo the masters' Flesh and Blood/Avalon era", comparing Murphy's vocals to the former Roxy Music member Bryan Ferry. He also noted that "the influence of former bandmates Love and Rockets' "So Alive" does hang around the arrangements a little."

== Track listing ==
1. "The Sweetest Drop (Radio Edit)" - 4:19
2. "Low Room (Album Version)" - 4:24
3. "All Night Long (Live)" - 5:10
4. "The Line Between The Devils Teeth (And That Which Cannot Be Repeat) (Live)" - 6:59
5. "The Sweetest Drop (Album Version)" - 6:53

== Personnel ==
- Peter Murphy – vocals, production, composition

The Hundred Men

- Terl Bryant – drums, percussion
- Eddie Branch – bass
- Peter Bonas – guitar, acoustic guitar

Additional musicians

- Zoe Caryl – backing vocals (4, 9)
- Alison Limerick – vocals (4, 9)

Other personnel

- Mike Thorne – production, synclavier
- Jason Appleton – production assistant
- Jack Skinner – mastering
- Fernando Kral – engineering, mixing
- Stuart Every – assistant engineer
- Laura Janisse – production assistant

== Chart positions ==
Chart (1992)	Peak position
US Billboard Modern Rock Tracks	2
