= Electrowerkz =

Alternative club venue in Islington, London

Coordinates: 51°31′57″N 0°6′19″W

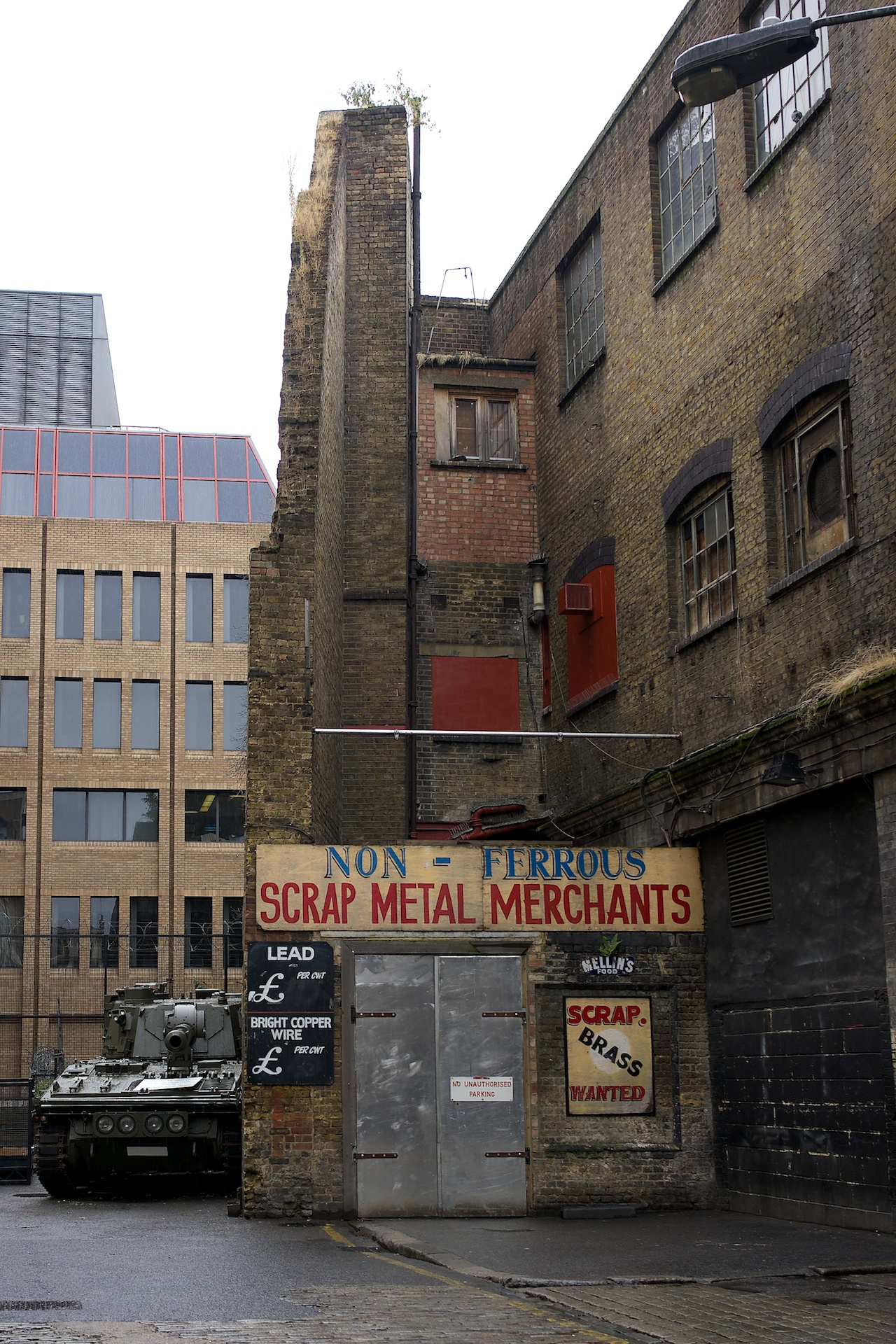
The Electrowerkz building

Electrowerkz is a late 19th-century industrial warehouse and former steel works factory which has been operating as a night club and event space since 1987. Electrowerkz club program includes BASH, ROAST, Slimelight, RIOT, Torture Garden, HUNTER, VOODOO, RIOT, GRIP, To The Left, Rave Story and Ziber. In 2025, Electrowerkz started two new club nights, KARMA KLUB and the members-only party THE LOCK IN. Electrowerkz also operates as a unique hireable space for corporate events, brand launches, parties, filming and photographic shoots.

== Layout ==
Electrowerkz has five floors of club rooms and event spaces. Much of the layout of the ground floor was shaped to accommodate Carsten Höller's pop-up restaurant Double Club in collaboration with Prada, which used the venue in November 2008–July 2009.

== Slimelight ==
Electrowerkz is home to Slimelight Slimelight, the world's longest running goth night, which has operated at the venue since it opened in 1987. Slimelight, also known as "Slimes", is an internationally renowned club night and dark scene community showcasing DJ's and live music performances playing goth, industrial, industrial techno, dark techno, dark electro, dark wave and cold wave music genres.

As well as DJs, Slimelight also regularly has live acts before the club or during it. Artists who have performed at Slimelight include VNV Nation, The Crüxshadows, Combichrist, Clan of Xymox and Nitzer Ebb.

To comply with premises licence laws when Slimelight began, the club set up a membership scheme that required existing members to approve new members. Although this membership policy is no longer necessary, the membership scheme still exists and provides members with a cheaper entrance fee.

While UK entertainment venues were restricted from holding in-person events during the COVID-19 pandemic, the club moved online with multiple livestream DJ events on Twitch.

Since 2022, Slimelight has been run by Ricardo Castro, a major name in London's dark club scene.

== Filming ==
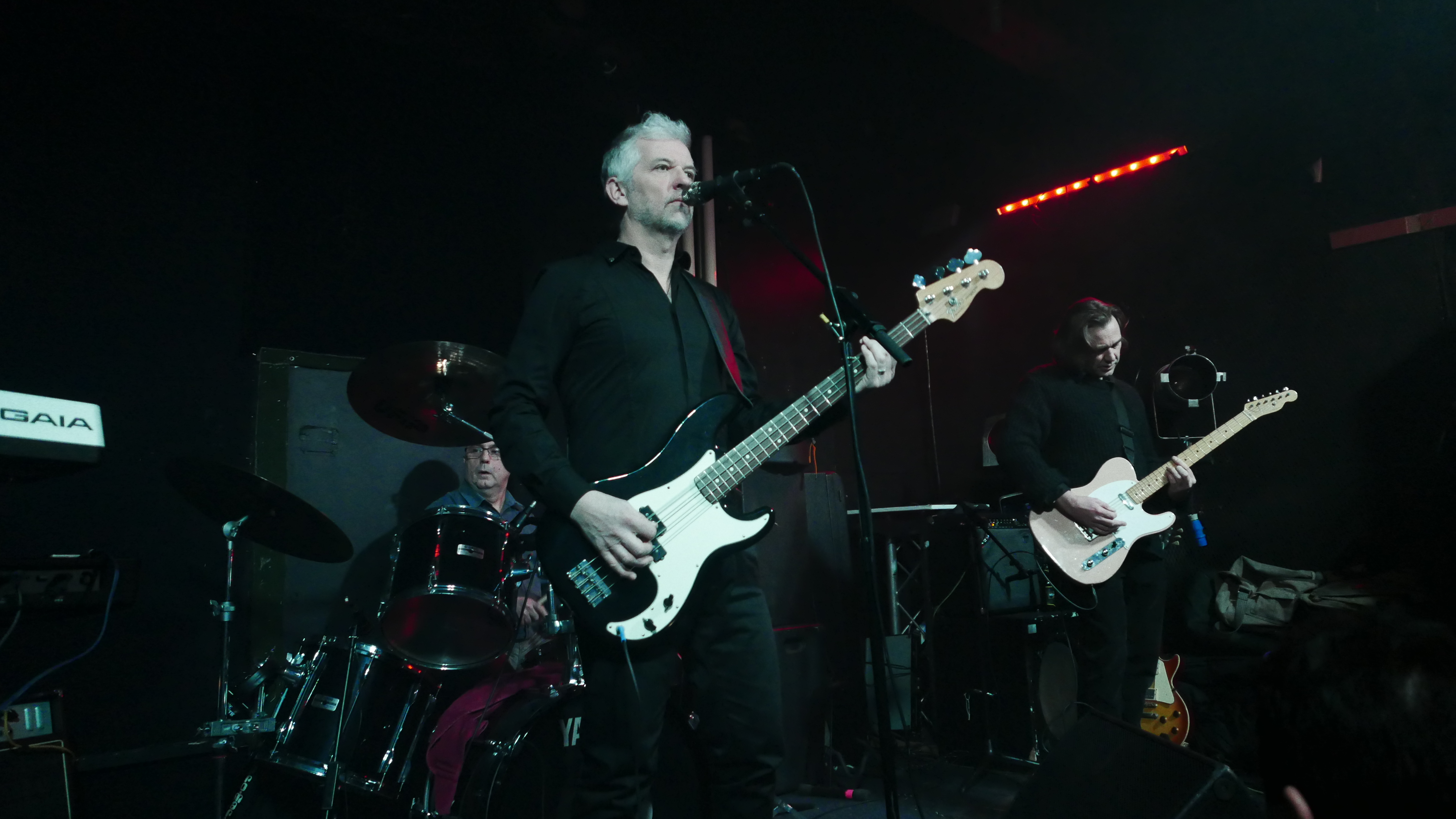
B-Movie performing at Electrowerkz in 2015

Electrowerkz was a filming location for the Black Mirror episode San Junipero. The venue was also a filming base for Roger Spottiswoode's 2016 film A Street Cat Named Bob and Idris Elba's 2018 film Yardie.

== Other events ==
Electrowerkz is also hired out for brand launches, fashion shows, exhibitions and as a film location with event profits going back into the club nights and community events.

== Mayuan Mak ==
Mayuan Mak was the owner of Electrowerkz until his death in December 2020. He was also the co-founder of Slimelight. He previously ran a scrap metal business from the building which now houses Electrowerkz.
