= Unshattered =

Studio album by Peter Murphy
- Released: 19 October 2004
- Genre: Alternative rock
- Length: 50:44
- Label: Viastar
- Producer: Gardner Cole

Peter Murphy chronology
| Dust (2002) | Unshattered (2004) | Ninth (2011) |

Professional ratings
Review scores
| Source | Rating |
|---|---|
| Allmusic | 3.5/5 stars |

Unshattered is the seventh solo studio album by English musician Peter Murphy. It was released on 19 October 2004, through Viastar Records. Produced by Gardner Cole, the album features contributions from various musicians, including Jane's Addiction members Stephen Perkins and Eric Avery, Porno for Pyros guitarist Peter DiStefano, former Bauhaus drummer Kevin Haskins and Canadian composer Ned Bouhalassa.

== Track listing ==
All lyrics are written by Peter Murphy

| No. | Title | Music | Length |
|---|---|---|---|
| 1. | "Idle Flow" | Peter DiStefano | 5:18 |
| 2. | "Kiss Myself" | Murphy, Paul Statham | 4:19 |
| 3. | "Piece of You" | Murphy, Statham | 5:19 |
| 4. | "Face the Moon" | Murphy, Statham | 5:24 |
| 5. | "Emergency Unit" | Murphy, Statham | 4:05 |
| 6. | "Thelma Sings to Little Nell" | Murphy, Kurt Swinghammer | 3:33 |
| 7. | "The Weight of Love" | Murphy, Statham | 4:09 |
| 8. | "Give What He's Got" | Ned Bouhalassa | 4:20 |
| 9. | "Blinded Like Saul" | Eric Avery, Doug DeAngelis, DiStéfano, Kevin Haskins | 3:58 |
| 10. | "The First Stone" | Bouhalassa | 4:15 |
| 11. | "Breaking No One's Heaven" | Gardner Cole, Murphy, Statham | 6:04 |
| Total length: | | | 50:44 |

== Personnel ==
- Peter Murphy - vocals, lyrics, arrangement

Other musicians

- Stephen Perkins - drums (1, 9, 10)
- Peter DiStefano - guitar (2, 9)
- Harry Gregson-Williams - programming (1); associate production (1)
- Ioannis Goudelis - accordion (1, 6)
- Sheetal Bhagat - backing vocals (2, 3)
- Ned Bouhalassa - programming (8, 10)
- Eric Avery - bass (10)
- Kevin Haskins - drums (9)
- Deon Estus - bass (3, 4, 7)
- Ramy Antoun - drums (3–8)
- Tim Pierce - guitar (1, 5, 6, 8–10)
- Paul Statham - programming (2–5, 7, 11); associate production (2–4, 7)

Technical personnel

- Gardner Cole - production; engineering (3, 4, 6–8); keyboards (2–5, 7, 8, 10, 11); guitar (4, 11); bass (6, 8, 11); drums (11); piano (6); bongo (10)
- Chauncey Gardner - engineering
- Bo Caldwell - assistant engineering
- Simeon Spiegel - engineering
- Daniel Cinelli - engineering (2, 5, 10, 11)
- Doug DeAngelis - engineering (9)
- Lisa Melanson - management
- Bruno Harvey - management
- Louisa Dery - management
- Howie Weinberg - mastering
- John Potoker - mixing
- Koray Birand - photography
- Orkan Telhan - graphic design
