= Peter Murphy (musician) =

English musician (born 1957)

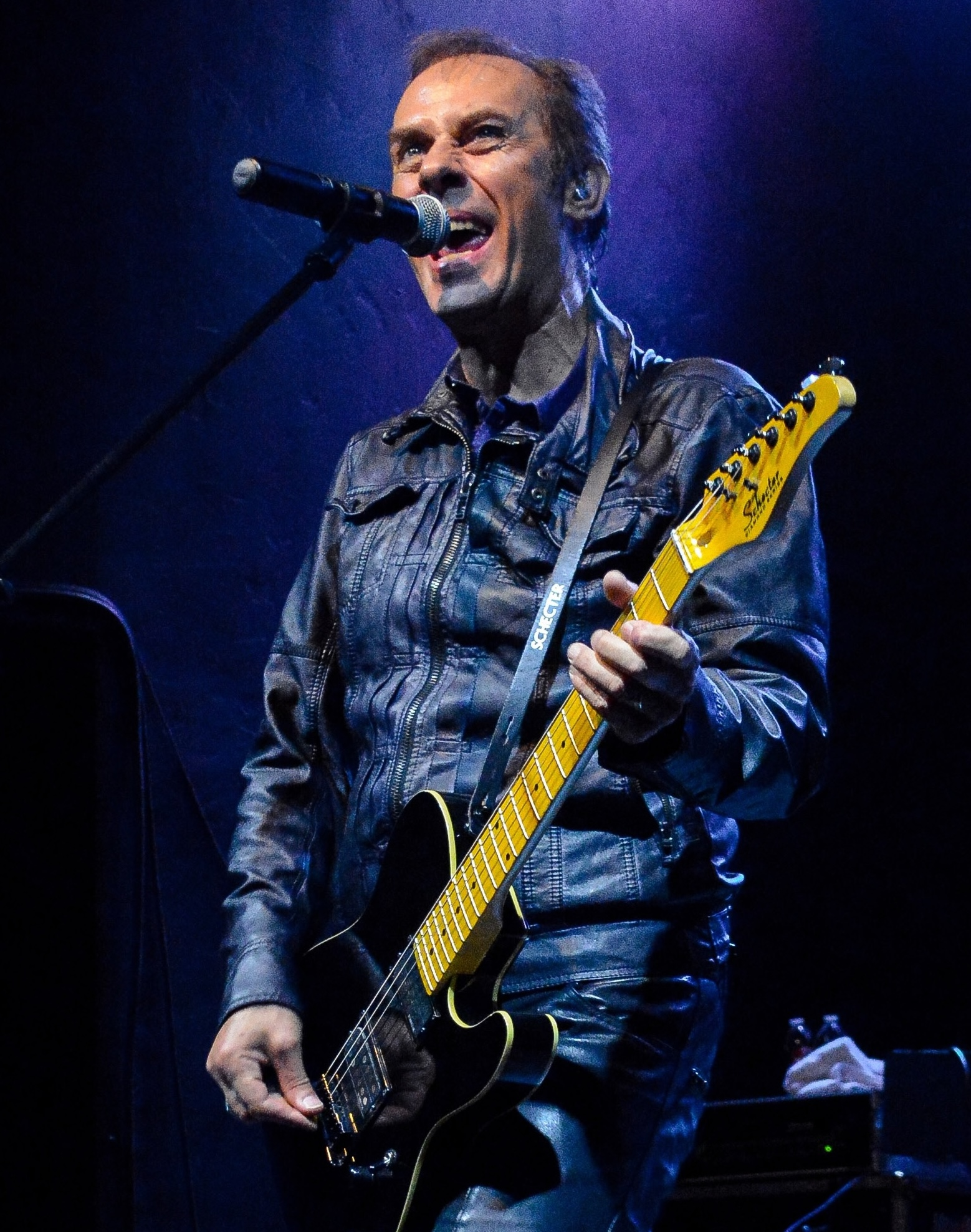
- Murphy performing in 2013

Background information
- Also known as: Godfather of Goth
- Born: Peter John Joseph Murphy; 11 July 1957 (age 69); Northampton, England
- Origin: Wellingborough, England
- Genres: Post-punk; gothic rock; alternative rock; world; ambient; experimental
- Instruments: Vocals; guitar; keyboards; melodica; congas
- Years active: 1978–present
- Labels: Beggars Banquet; Nettwerk
- Formerly of: Bauhaus; Dalis Car
- Website: petermurphy.info

Peter John Joseph Murphy (born 11 July 1957) is an English singer and songwriter. He is the vocalist for the post-punk band Bauhaus, which he co-founded with Daniel Ash in 1978. After Bauhaus disbanded, Murphy formed Dalis Car with Japan's bassist Mick Karn and released one album, The Waking Hour (1984). He went on to release a number of solo albums, including Should the World Fail to Fall Apart (1986) and Love Hysteria (1988).

In 1990, Murphy achieved commercial success with his album Deep, which reached No. 44 on the Billboard 200. It was accompanied by the single "Cuts You Up", which reached No. 55 on the Billboard Hot 100. In 1992, Murphy released Holy Smoke, which reached No. 108 on the Billboard 200 chart, featuring lead single "The Sweetest Drop". After the release of Holy Smoke, he moved from England to Turkey with his family and from there he released Cascade in 1995. Bauhaus then reunited for the Resurrection Tour in 1998, which was documented on the live album Gotham (1999).

In 2002, Murphy released Dust with Turkish-Canadian composer and producer Mercan Dede, which largely abandoned rock music for traditional Turkish instrumentation and eclectic genre influences. He followed this up two years later with Unshattered (2004), a return to alternative rock. The next several years would see a second reunion of Bauhaus from 2005-2007 during which they recorded their fifth and final album Go Away White, released in 2008 after they had broken up again. Murphy then returned to his solo efforts, releasing Ninth in 2011. In 2014, he released Lion, produced by Youth, which reached No. 173 on the Billboard 200. On 9 May 2025 Murphy released Silver Shade, again produced by Youth. Three singles from the album preceded its release, "Let the Flowers Grow" - a song with Boy George, "Swoon" - which had Trent Reznor contributing vocals, and "The Artroom Wonder."

Thin with prominent cheekbones, a baritone voice, and a penchant for gloomy poetics, he is often called the "Godfather of Goth".

== Early life ==
Peter John Joseph Murphy was born on 11 July 1957 in Northampton, Northamptonshire, the seventh child of a large rural working-class family of Irish descent. He has an older sister Shirley and two elder brothers, Daniel, and Christopher, after whom Murphy so soon followed that their family called them twins. He was raised in Wellingborough, Northamptonshire, where he had a strict Catholic upbringing in the town's Kingsway area. He described having a happy childhood with a close family which had a "great emphasis on Catholicism in a very sincere, deep, profound way. Always aware of the mysteries of life, mortality, Heaven, Hell, angels, saints and purgatory: all these images. What is allowed and what is not allowed." Murphy's first interest in music was inspired by his mother, who would frequently hum songs. As a teenager, he was introverted but attracted to the arts.

At school, Murphy became friends with Daniel Ash, describing their first meeting: "The first moment I saw him, literally, I really loved him. It was not sexual; I was attracted to him in a fateful sense. Something told me that this guy was important. I remember being enamoured by him. I felt very close to him. Extremely. It was almost like a bonding that was immediate and whole. I think I recognised a lot of my own faults in him. I felt there was someone who could understand me. I saw him as the mirror of myself. He was always the person who would be positive and practical and not be lazy and always wanted to be in a band. And so I would have done anything for him in that sense because I wanted to be around him."

Murphy and Ash's musical tastes were shared by their fondness of the glam movement and its artists such as David Bowie and T. Rex. When Ash received his first electric guitar, he would bring Murphy during the lunch hour to hear him play it. Ash was interested in being in a band and told Murphy that he could be in one too, because of his looks. Despite this comment, Murphy was not interested. According to Ash, "Pete didn't think about it at all, it wasn't on his mind as such."

When Murphy was sixteen, he left school to work at a local family printing business, while Ash enrolled in an art college. Murphy worked for his family's printing business for five years, first as a bookbinder and then as a printer. When Murphy came into contact with Ash after two years, Ash suggested that he should apply to art college. Due to his introversion, he subsequently eschewed an opportunity to attend art college, opting instead to work as a printer's assistant while working on painting, writing and singing on the side.

While still working at the printing firm, Murphy maintained an interest in music. He explained: "I was very interested in figures like Bowie, Bolan and Iggy. I related to their psyches more than their music." He loved Iggy Pop's albums such as The Idiot and Lust for Life, and went to see artists and bands such as David Bowie (during his Thin White Duke tour) and Judas Priest. He then went to a local pub and saw Ash's latest band at the time, "Jackplug and The Sockets". The band consists of Ash on guitar, David J on bass and Kevin Haskins on drums and played mainly cover songs from the Rolling Stones. After the concert, Ash caught sight of Murphy and continued to mentioned to him that "You must be in a band". However, nothing came about it. After some months later, Ash's latest band split up which caused him to become depressed. However, Ash was still determined to form another band. He needed a singer and remembered his old friend from the pub with his old band, months ago. Ash explained how he approached Murphy for this offer: "I didn't ring him up or anything. I just arrived at his door and he was just arriving back home from work on his little motorcycle. I got out the car, knocked on the door and was surprised to see me. I just played him this tape (a demo of Jackplug songs) and I asked him if he wanted to get something going."

Murphy finally accepted Ash's offer and explained about his decision: "I thought, Yes, I don't mind. Yes. If you're doing it, I'll do it because you fascinate me." After Murphy accepted Ash's offer, they got together over a weekend in a mobile classroom at the Northampton's Teacher Training College and used that room as a rehearsal room. Ash explained this meeting: "Just Pete and myself went in. I drove him from Wellingborough to Northampton. He didn't have any lyrics or anything, he didn't know if he could sing or anything as such, but he had a newspaper and I just put loads of echo on the mike to give him confidence, make him sound good and I just started playing a riff - anything that came into head and he just started singing from the newspaper. As soon as I heard him sing I knew within five minutes - I honestly thought it was just a matter of time. He had the voice, the charisma, the good looks - the whole thing."

== Career ==
=== Bauhaus ===
Daniel Ash convinced Murphy to join Bauhaus, one of the establishing acts of the goth movement. Their use of spacey recording effects and theatrical aesthetics was evocative of glam rock; they became an influential group in the early days of gothic rock. In 1983, Bauhaus appeared during the opening sequences of the horror film The Hunger, performing one of their most popular songs, "Bela Lugosi's Dead". The camera focused almost exclusively on Murphy during most of the scene, panning only briefly to the stars David Bowie and Catherine Deneuve. Bauhaus reformed in 1998 for a tour, and later reunited again in 2005, culminating in a tour with the band Nine Inch Nails in 2007, and a final album, Go Away White, released in 2008 shortly before disbanding again. They reunited once more in late 2019 for three reunion shows in Los Angeles, California, and launched a reunion tour post pandemic which ended in 2022.

=== Dalis Car and solo career ===
==== Break from music and Dalis Car: 1983–1984 ====
By 1983, Bauhaus had broken up and Murphy went on to new projects not involving Bauhaus members Kevin Haskins, David J or Daniel Ash. He received an offer to play Fletcher Christian in a remake of Mutiny on the Bounty. He also auditioned for a role of Tarzan in Greystoke. The British director Derek Jarman was interested in using him in his film Caravaggio. Murphy turned many of these offers down due to his insecurity of his slight stammer as he was very self-conscious about it. This speech impediment made Murphy anxious about branching out to film, TV and radio work despite the encouragement of his ex-manager Harry Isles to accept some of these roles. He even refused a follow-up ad for Maxell since in his words, "they wanted me to go through space with this dolly bird." However, Murphy did focus a significant amount of time to dance and his interest in this activity strengthened with his new girlfriend and future wife, Beyhan Foulkes, who was a choreographer. As Murphy explained: "She’s introduced me to new aspects of movement and dance that I’d like to try. I’ve always liked the modern Ballet Rambert style of dance and I’d like to co-ordinate that with my music…writing the music and dance together." Murphy made an appearance on the TV arts programme Riverside, one month after Bauhaus split up, where he performed a dance routine in a sandpit in a "locationally obscure" beach with a female dance partner, Annie Cox. The background music for this routine was the Bauhaus track "Hollow Hills". It was not received well by the public and even Murphy admitted that, "it didn’t work. It looked rather silly really." Despite his interest in the subject, Murphy did not want to be a serious dancer. He found dance to be useful skill for his repertoire. As Murphy explained: "I’ve learnt things and I’m storing them for whenever the need comes to use them." He also made an appearance to take part of Nicholas Treadwell's Superhumanist Exhibition at an old manor house that was converted into a studio and gallery in Canterbury. Murphy explained this experience: "I appeared as the Father of Time in one dance. It was an environmental Dance installation which people would experience as they walked through the gallery." After some brief dabbling with acting and dance – including a television performance to Bauhaus's "Hollow Hills". In the aftermath of Bauhaus splitting up, Beggars Banquet had offered him a recording contact as a solo artist but Murphy declined. Murphy showed no interest in making music for one year after the band's break up.

After one year, Murphy wanted to record music again. However, he had difficulties with creating music at the time since his bandmates from Bauhaus had come up with the musical ideas and use them in their work. Murphy's input was limited to writing and interpreting lyrics, creating vocal rhythms, adding vocal parts into songs. Also, despite Murphy's input to the occasional sound effect on a Wasp synthesiser, playing a few percussion instruments and efforts of basic guitar, he did not play any musical instruments professionally. Murphy later explained this: "As a solo artist I had to learn to make records without this machine I had been part of. I had no skill. No idea what I should do. I was suddenly a solo person writing from where? From what perspective? So I was looking to find what I had to offer." Murphy was in need of a collaborator at the time. Around the same time, the bass player Mick Karn from the new wave band Japan was struggling with his solo career as well when his band split up. Despite his musical ability, recorded demos and session work, Karn was struggling to get a record deal since he was mainly interested in making instrumental music rather than pop songs. In order to secure a record deal, he needed to convince a record company that his work has commercial prospects. Karn was looking for a frontman.

In 1984, Murphy and Karn formed Dalis Car. The origins of the band started during an Murphy's interview by a Japanese journalist for the Magazine "Quiet Life", where he spoke of his admiration for Mick Karn's work and his unique bass style. The same journalist interviewed Karn a week before Murphy's interview and had Karn's telephone number. Murphy jotted Karn's number down and called Karn for a conversation. This led to a meeting and dinner in a restaurant and both discovered that they had a connection with each other. Did led to the creation of Dalis Car along with drummer, Paul Vincent Lawson. Despite the popular belief that the group took their name from a Captain Beefheart song from his seminal album, Trout Mask Replica, this was apocryphal. Instead, the name came from a dream from Murphy's friend, where he dreamed of buying a car belonging to Salvador Dalí. There were issues and conflicts during this time. Karn explained one issue on how each of them had a different way to construct music: "There would be whole sections I'd leave for the vocals to take over the track, whereas Pete saw it from a completely different musical perspective; "Well, this is such a nice musical break I don't want to touch it."So I guess there was a certain amount of friction caused by that because we both heard the tracks in a completely different way." Another issue was their drummer, Paul Lawson. As Karn explained: "He was supposed to be the other third of the band. Originally, that was the idea. He would be playing live drums – we got on with him very well, he was very young and eager – unfortunately when we got into the studio we found that nerves took over and he couldn’t actually play so much. So we ended up having him programme most of the patterns rather than play them." Despite not touring in front of live audience due to these previous issues, they did make a performance of their single "His Box" on The Old Grey Whistle Test where they played over a backing track. One commentator mentioned their reaction to their appearance in the performance by saying: "In their sober suits they looked like investment bankers who had just had a bad day on the stock market". The group recorded only one album called The Waking Hour. The cover was the painting Daybreak by American artist Maxfield Parrish. The album went overbudget and was not successful and despite Karn's willingness to continue on with the group, Murphy was not interested based on the lack of success. In fact, he did not even show up when Karn established the bonus tracks for their single, where Murphy would prefer to stay in Turkey with this wife. According to Karn: "by that point it became obvious that Peter didn't want to carry on with it."

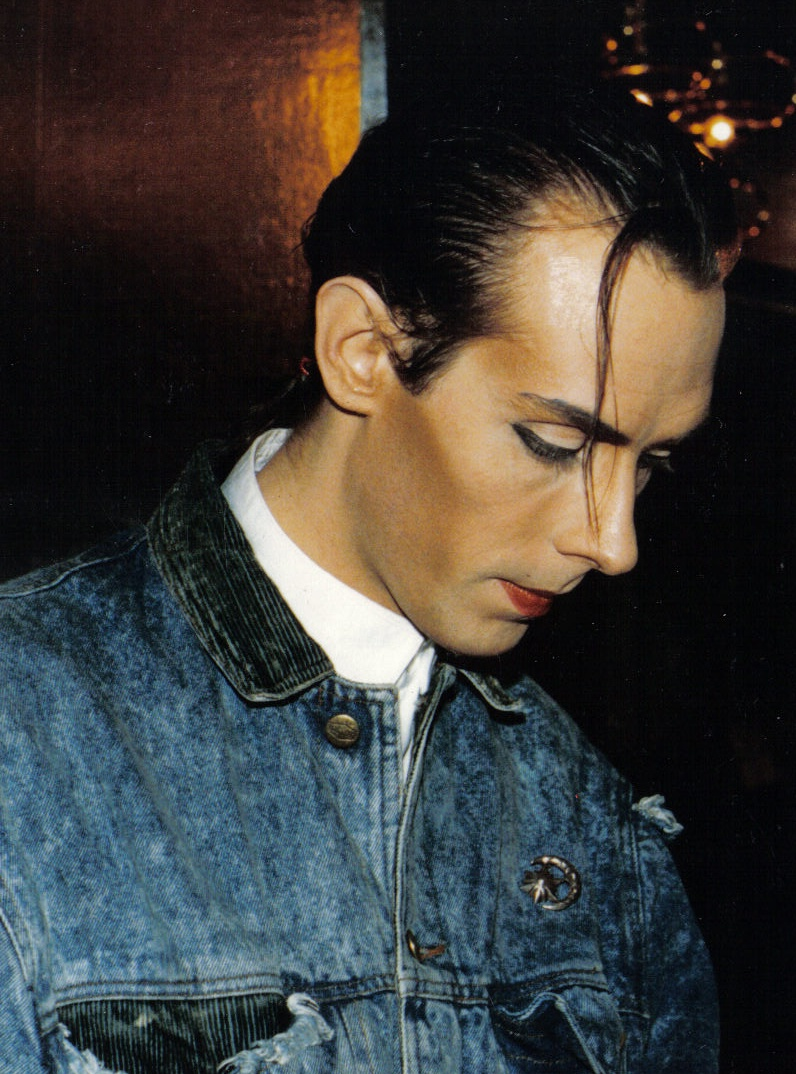
Murphy in San Francisco, 1987

==== Should the World Fail to Fall Apart: 1985–1986 ====
After Dalis Car's lack of commercial success, Murphy wanted to have more creative control and influence to the record that he wanted to make. As he explained that he wanted: "to see if there was anything worth pursuing as a solo artist, to fish around and see if I was talented enough to make something interesting". He was still in need of a collaborator and wanted to find someone to work with than oppose. He eventually choose L. Howard Hughes from the Associates, who he had met six months previously when he was still in Dalis Car. Initially Peter Kent, who was somewhat Murphy’s manager at the time, recommended Hughes to him as an ideal candidate for Murphy. They had a meeting together, however, Murphy was still committed to Dalis Car at the time, so Hughes did not think much of it until he got a call from Murphy after Dalis Car was finished, asking to collaborate. They then decided to have a meeting at Cornwall, where Howard was living at the time. So, Murphy took a train to Cornwall and they both met in the train station and Hughes drove him to his house. During this meeting, Hughes admitted to never having heard Bauhaus before. As Hughes explained: "I just knew you were this band with this crazy singer." Murphy in jest demanded that he drive him back to the station.

During the days after they had their last meeting, they both recorded some demos (such as "Confessions of a Mask" and "Canvas Beauty") and sent them to Beggars Banquet. They liked the demos and were put into a studio because of this. Murphy picked Ivo Watts-Russell of 4AD records as the producer his first solo record. Despite Watts-Russell never producing a record before at the time, Murphy chose him due to wanting a non-musician and liking his mixing work of music with different musicians in the record It'll End in Tears. Hughes motivated Murphy to participate in musical ideas for his solo album. This allowed Murphy to contribute to musical fragments and then Hughes could take those fragments and transform them into music. Hughes explained the process of this procedure: "Pete had melodic ideas and he also had a lot of other ideas, guitar ideas and bits of drum patterns. I said, 'whatever, we'll just make it up'. It was quite an easy and free way to work. At that time I was really influenced by Talking Heads’ Remain In Light album. All of tracks have two or three note bass lines all through the track, and all of the music on top would go in all sorts of different directions but the bass lines always remained the same." Murphy wanted to gather all sorts of people who he thought was going to make an interesting contribution to his album. For his cover of Magazine’s "The Light Pours Out Of Me", he got in John McGeoch to recreate his guitar part of the song. Other notable contributors would include a Turkish guitarist Erkan Oğur and Daniel Ash. Ironically, one of the song of the album, "The Answer is Clear" was a response to Daniel Ash regarding a perceived song about him called "Movement of Fear" with Ash's band Tones on Tail. Murphy explained the origins of this song: "[Ash's Movement of Fear] seemed like it was about me and I really objected to him writing about me in public. I felt that it was impolite. Breaking confidence. So I wrote a song, 'The Answer Is Clear'."

They sent the music to Beggars Banquet and approved of the album. In regard to the finishing tapes, Ivo Watts-Russell was responsible for the initially mixing the album. While Murphy was intrigued with the ambient style of mixing, both he and Hughes took the tapes and decided to mix them by themselves. However, Ivo’s contribution of the single "Final Solution" were kept and the "ambient" mix of the title track of the album did show up on the B-side of the single. Murphy had full control of choosing the cover art for the album. The album cover art was contributed by a Venezuelan artist Carlos Sosa, who was a friend of Murphy. Murphy decided to convince Beggars Banquet to pay for Sosa’s plane ticket from Venezuela to England to get the cover art. Murphy explained his friend's style of painting and how it contributed to the cover art: "His stuff was now very simple, childlike, unknowing and naïve. He thought that was how my album was. So we painted (the cover) together in my attic. It was like a nursery picture." Murphy's first solo album, Should the World Fail to Fall Apart (1986), was similarly overlooked. Should the World Fail to Fall Apart did spawn several singles, including a cover of Pere Ubu's "Final Solution". Murphy showed some concerns and reluctance to perform the album live. Murphy explained his reasons on why: "I was pressed to get a band together. I was almost dragged into it by necessity to earn money. I didn’t really feel like going out on the road at all after the exhaustive Bauhaus tours. I was very shy, didn’t really feel confident enough to confront name musicians or really didn’t have any idea of who to choose. After working with Bauhaus, such a creative set of people and such a definite identity, it was going to be difficult to follow that up. To follow it up with a reflection of Bauhaus or something that was in the same direction would be very stupid and unnecessary and not work at all. You just couldn’t get that power."

After getting motivated by his manager Graham Bentley, Murphy decided he wanted to go touring again despite his shyness. He interested in setting a backing band to his solo career for live performances. He auditioned several musicians like drummer Terl Bryant, bassist Eddie Branch, guitarist Pete Bonas and keyboardist Paul Statham from B-Movie. Murphy was adamant that the music of his first solo album sound exactly like the LP and the band complies with his request. He also included some Bauhaus songs due to Murphy's awareness of his audience's expectations based on his reputation. While Murphy wanted his solo career to be distinct from his former band’s work, he was aware of some of the advantages that came from it. As Hughes explained: "We listened to the originals and we did what was there. We weren’t Bauhaus, we didn’t have the Bauhaus attitude or the magic but Pete was singing it so we were 90% there because of that. We just took them apart, put them back together and did them." They played shows in Italy as a warm-up to get Murphy to played live again after being on hiatus and they were successful. However, when the band returned to England to play three shows, the audience were small in comparison to his Bauhaus’ days. When setting up for a tour for America, Howard Hughes decided to leave the band, despite Murphy’s dismay, to focus full time on his own band ‘The Western Approaches’. While Hughes enjoyed being in Murphy’s band, however, the deciding factor of him leaving was when he playing in Japan, where a girl came up to him and asked him to sign his own band’s single, which Hughes remarked: "God knows how she got it. It was on a really small label in the UK." Hughes also mentions: "Pete came around to my house and said; 'I really want you to come to the States with me.' But I really didn't want to go. I definitely wanted to stay here with my own band. I had the same thing with The Associates. I always worked with other people although at the end of the day I wanted to do my own stuff." With Hughes’ departure, Statham took more assignments with full-time keyboard duties, playing some rhythm guitar parts and became Murphy’s new songwriting contributor based on the recommendation from Hughes. Around the same time, his manager Graham Bentley also decided to leave as well. The 19-date North American tour began in Boston on 10 February 1987, and ended in Santa Clara almost month later.

==== Love Hysteria: 1987–1988 ====
When returning to England, in alliance with Paul Statham, they decided to begin writing songs for his second solo album. Statham explained the process of this: "He was living in Primrose Hill, he had this attic and just a little four track in there and he'd lock me in there with all his stuff and I'd just sit up there and write some backing tracks for him. I wrote the music first 'All Night Long', 'Indigo Eyes' and 'His Circle and Hers Meets', those three tracks ended up on Love Hysteria and he sang on them. It was really creative, really fun because I didn't know how it was going to turn out. I was thinking what is he going to do on this? The stuff I'd done originally, the versions were very similar to what turned out on the record but more commercial a bit more sweet and he kind of knocked the sweetness out of them." Murphy also worked on the material of the album by himself. In regards to producing, despite talks of having Daniel Lanois and Brian Eno, Murphy decided to choose Simon Rogers for production of the album and Beggars Banquet approved of the decision. Murphy's decision was based on his and Rogers's shared musical tastes in "world music and ambient stuff". The backing band also contributed to the album songwriting on such tracks such as "Time Has Got Nothing To Do With It" was written with Pete Bonas and "I've Got A Miniature Secret Camera" with Eddie Branch. One of the tracks called "Socrates The Python" was improvised. Rogers explained this improvisation: "That was pretty much me and [Murphy] and some percussion and some overdubs. We just sat down and played a few things and it was one of the occasions it worked." Rogers also contributed to filling in the gaps of the album by incorporating samples of Japanese fishermen and incorporating Jean Cocteau on the track "All Night Long". Murphy's record company gave him complete control in the creation of the album.

When completing the album, Murphy explained that he wanted to "reflect a sense of happiness, strength and optimism which I am currently feeling." In regards to the album's lyrics, the meaning were more subtle than specific, which made the listener to form their own interpretation to them. As Murphy explained: "Love Hysteria has a lot of other world stories and fairy tales for adults and children – that's the sort of imagery I want. I don't really find commenting on the solid world interesting." The track "All Night Long" became a single along with a promotional music video was created with director Matt Mahurin. Murphy was optimistic about the LP and also wished that it will put labels such as "Grandfather of Goth" behind him. Love Hysteria was his first official solo release to America since Beggars Banquet managed to license Murphy to RCA Records.

The follow-up, Love Hysteria (1988), was not successful in the UK, although it performed better than his previous solo releases in the US. The album also marked the beginning of a long-term collaboration with songwriter Paul Statham from B-Movie, who co-wrote songs with Murphy until 1995. The resulting singles "All Night Long" and "Indigo Eyes" helped attract a wider following, and the black-and-white video for "All Night Long" entered rotation on MTV. The album received a significant amount of airplay on college radio networks in the United States. Due to being more commercial compared to his previous albums, it also allowed Murphy to garner a whole new audience compared to his previous audience with Bauhaus, which in turn, baffled some of his fans. To promote the album, Murphy toured and performed live in the United States with the Australian band The Church. Murphy also played a cover of Prince's "Purple Rain" during his Love Hysteria tour. Around this time, in order to give Murphy's backing band an identity, they were named after a line from his single "All Night Long" called The Hundred Men.

==== Deep: 1988–1990 ====
The pinnacle of Murphy's solo popularity in the US came with the release of Deep (1989). For this album, Murphy sported hair dyed platinum blonde and returned to the more aggressive alt-rock sound that was a trademark of early Bauhaus. The single "Cuts You Up" from Deep held on to the top spot on the Billboard Modern Rock Tracks chart for seven weeks. "Cuts You Up" remains Murphy's most popular song to date.

His lead single, "Cuts You Up" would become a surprise success along with his upcoming album Deep. According to Simon Rogers regarding the single, "It was pretty much exactly like the demo. That violin part just came out. It was just there. (Peter) did it with a sample. We actually got someone to play it. We thought it would be bliss if someone actually played that line. We got a really great viola player in to do it – it was shit – he played it great but it didn't sound as good as the sample. It didn't have that atmosphere – it was too moody." The success of Deep allowed Murphy to graduate into larger venues. Sometimes, the crowds would get frantic around that time as well. For example, when Murphy, supported by Jane's Addiction, played at the Fender Ballroom in Los Angeles, the scene become chaotic. According to Pete Bonas: "We were playing 'God Sends' – this light vibe – and there was all mayhem in the audience. People passing out, a crush at the front of the stage, people unconscious, unconscious people on the stage – oxygen bottles. It was crazy." The single "Cuts You Up" topped the college radio charts for 13 weeks and hit number 10 in the AOR chart as well. The success of the single caught the record label, RCA Records, by surprise. According to Statham: "Cuts You Up sold 250,000 copies in three weeks and they were caught on the hop. So they threw themselves into a mad frenzy of promotion across the country. At Tower Records in Los Angeles they placed a big cardboard figure of Pete in the car forecourt. They suddenly realised that they were onto something. They went mad. It was like Spinal Tap, after every gig there was twenty to thirty people from RCA (backstage) in every town". The album eventually sold 350,000 copies and reached up to number 41 in the Billboard charts. The follow-up single "A Strange Kind of Love" did not achieve the same success as its predecessor. Paul Statham recalled his feeling when they faced with such significant success and reduction in such as short time, "We found out what it was like to be flavour of the month. For one month." Despite this, the success of Deep allowed Murphy to play in front of large audiences and even played in the Universal Amphitheatre in California to 25,000 people. Murphy played a cover of Captain Beefheart’s song "Clear Spot" on his Deep tour.

During this time, the band The Hundred Men wanted to be recognised by their own name rather than being Murphy's backing band. They wanted to have their name billed with Murphy. However, despite Murphy willing to accommodate this request, the promoters and management were not interested in satisfying this request considering that the public wanted to see Murphy rather than the backing band. During the zenith of the Deep era, RCA actually did discuss about having The Hundred Men signed up as a recording act their own right. However, nothing came out of this discussion. In contrast to his involvement with Bauhaus where "we had to listen to each other in the studio", Murphy liked his solo career where he can make sure that things were done according to his own discretion regarding on stage and in the studio as well. According to Statham, "Nobody was interested in us. It was Pete, Pete, Pete, Pete, Pete. So of course he had to do everything."

==== Holy Smoke: 1990–1992 ====
Based on the success of Deep, Murphy was confident that his next LP would continue to move him up the charts. However, after touring incessantly, he wanted to have a break and spend more time with his family in Turkey. So he worked in his own pace and divided his time between London and Turkey. Two years later, Murphy decided to record again with, at the suggestion of Martin Mills, Mike Throne as a producer. Murphy liked and appreciated his work with bands such as Wire, Marc Almond and The Communards and even two singles from Paul Statham's old band B-Movie.

Regarding the sound of the LP, Murphy explained: "I wanted to make use of the band properly this time – wanted to capture the live feel of the band then texture them". This contrasts with his two earlier albums that had been constructed together by substantial sampling of the musicians. The pre-production, which lasted for two weeks in New York, only involved Murphy, Throne, and Statham. The main content of four tracks were created at that time, during which several issues arose. Murphy was very aware his next LP after Deep could potentially help him break the charts and cross over into the mainstream. This awareness made Murphy nervous and thus made him arduous in maintaining a bond with Thorne. Also, his band did not produce the results that Murphy wanted, and Murphy continued the sessions until he got everything that he wanted. Thorne recalled that this was the longest time he spend on a LP.

This LP was called Holy Smoke, which was released in 1992. In America, it sold only an underwhelming 100,000 copies. There was a single called "Hit Song". Mike Thorne commented on the track: "We all genuinely enjoyed the song despite its straight ahead ballad style - there was no deliberate straining for crossover success. If anything Peter's self-consciousness lay in avoiding potential crossover sounds and conventional music marketry producing to the detriment of impact." Bauhaus author Ian Shirley suggested that the album did not do so well due to the time lapse when grunge broke into the mainstream consciousness and lack of standing out. It has been suggested that Murphy's previous marketing team for Deep were removed when RCA Records was taken over by BMG. Despite this, his new marketing team did manage to get Murphy booked on his first American TV exposure on the Dennis Miller Show on April 22, 1992, where he performed the song, "You're So Close"; the single that RCA Records wanted to have as the first single. Murphy commented on this experience, "I look back on that. That was my first ever major exposure in America. I turned up in a cassock! Artistically it was natural, full of the imagery I wanted for the live show. But in the context of the Dennis Miller Show I suddenly saw how I appeared to people en masse and it was as an obscure English artist, some weird bloke looking theatrical but in a way that was inappropriate."

For the cover of the album, Murphy chose photographer Anton Corbijn to do a session for it, where he came up with a variation of shots in different locations, poses along with numerous techniques. Murphy commented on the photo that ultimately became the cover of his LP, "I lined the photographs up in my house for a week. This one photograph was really haunting me, it was kind of very powerful and quite difficult to deal with – and to contemplate it as an album cover was quite radical, very brave actually at a point where I was following up Deep." Also, according to Murphy regarding the message of the picture, he was making, "A radical statement against image, the plastic use of image, personality and forced charisma in the music business. It was an obvious statement against that." This did not help his album sales as some of his fans were baffled of the image considering his imagery in the past.

Shirley suggested that Murphy's mistakes were made worse when he got Paul Morley to do his press release, which did not help sell Murphy to the masses. In his speech, Morley admitted: "I know very little about Peter Murphy. I know his name, and I know the shape of his head, because it's a shape I've always been very jealous of. I think anyone with a head shaped like that, all kind of sharp and hollow and almost sinister, must have something of the magical about him. I wonder if it's a fluke that he has a head like that, a splendid accident of birth, or has it been sheer vain anxious will-power that has shaped Peter Murphy's head into something so positively Artaudian, if you'll pardon my French. I know also that he has eyes as hollow as a dream, eyes that seem incapable of shame, and a decayed mouth that could but for the grace of God eat you alive and kiss you to death." At the end of the tour promoting the album, the band "The Hundred Men" was split up by Murphy, who commented that "the band run its course. It was a wonderful band but I knew something was going to change." Shirley suggested that the poor sales of the LP along with financial issues since the band had no contractual associations with either Beggars Banquet or RCA and instead were paid a weekly payment by Murphy's management company for seven years, could be the main factors for the band's spilt.

Murphy moved to Turkey with his wife, and a Middle Eastern influence can be heard in his later albums. 1992's Holy Smoke mixed some traditional Turkish influences into the music while continuing the sound pioneered on Deep.

==== Cascade: 1992–1995 ====
Around this time after Holy Smoke, Murphy decided to permanently reside in Turkey with his family. Despite not touring or recording, he still continued to write songs with Paul Statham. In 1994, Murphy decided to record a new album with Statham and producer Pascal Gabriel. The basic programming for the LP was done at Peter Gabriel’s Real World Studios near Bath. They then moved to Spain for a period of six weeks. Murphy was interested to have musicians such as Robert Fripp (from King Crimson) and Peter Brook contribute to the album. However, this interest did not come into fruition.

In 1995, Murphy embraced a lower-key, ambient pop sound for Cascade, featuring producer Pascal Gabriel, guest work from "infinite guitarist" Michael Brook, and overall a much stronger incorporation of electronics. This album was also to be his last major collaboration with Paul Statham, who departed to form Peach with Gabriel and eventually write songs for Dido and Kylie Minogue. Cascade was also Murphy's last original release for Beggars Banquet Records, which had been his label since Bauhaus. To promote the album, Murphy was a musical guest on MTV's The Jon Stewart Show, performing his song "The Scarlet Thing in You" on May 23, 1995. The American folk musician Jewel was the opening act for Murphy on his North American tour in support of the album.

==== 1995–2000 ====
Shortly after his departure from Beggars Banquet, Murphy recorded the Recall EP for the newly formed Red Ant records, featuring a few new songs and some new, heavily electronic versions of older material, reworked in conjunction with Sascha Konietzko, Bill Rieflin and Tim Skold of the band KMFDM. Once again, Murphy became label-mates with former Bauhaus alums Love and Rockets, who had also signed to Red Ant. This generated a significant number of rumours regarding a possible reformation of Bauhaus. While Red Ant quickly folded, Bauhaus did reform in 1998 for the Resurrection tour, one performance of which (at the Hammerstein Ballroom, New York City) was recorded and released on DVD by Metropolis Records as Gotham. The tour was a success.

==== 2000s ====
In 2000, Murphy performed his international Just for Love tour, which resulted in the album aLive Just for Love. It is a live recording of a fully uninterrupted set from the El Rey Theatre in Los Angeles on 30 November 2000. During the tour, Murphy chose to perform with only two back-up musicians, Canadian electric violinist Hugh Marsh and Peter DiStefano from Porno for Pyros on guitar, although former Bauhaus bassist David J sometimes joined the trio for an encore. At this point, Murphy also contributed to works by film composer Harry Gregson-Williams.

Also in 2000, Murphy gave a nod to the North American goth scene, where his solo works and his works with Bauhaus are still popular, by making a surprise guest appearance at the sixth annual Convergence festival in Seattle, to perform a low-key, acoustic solo set.

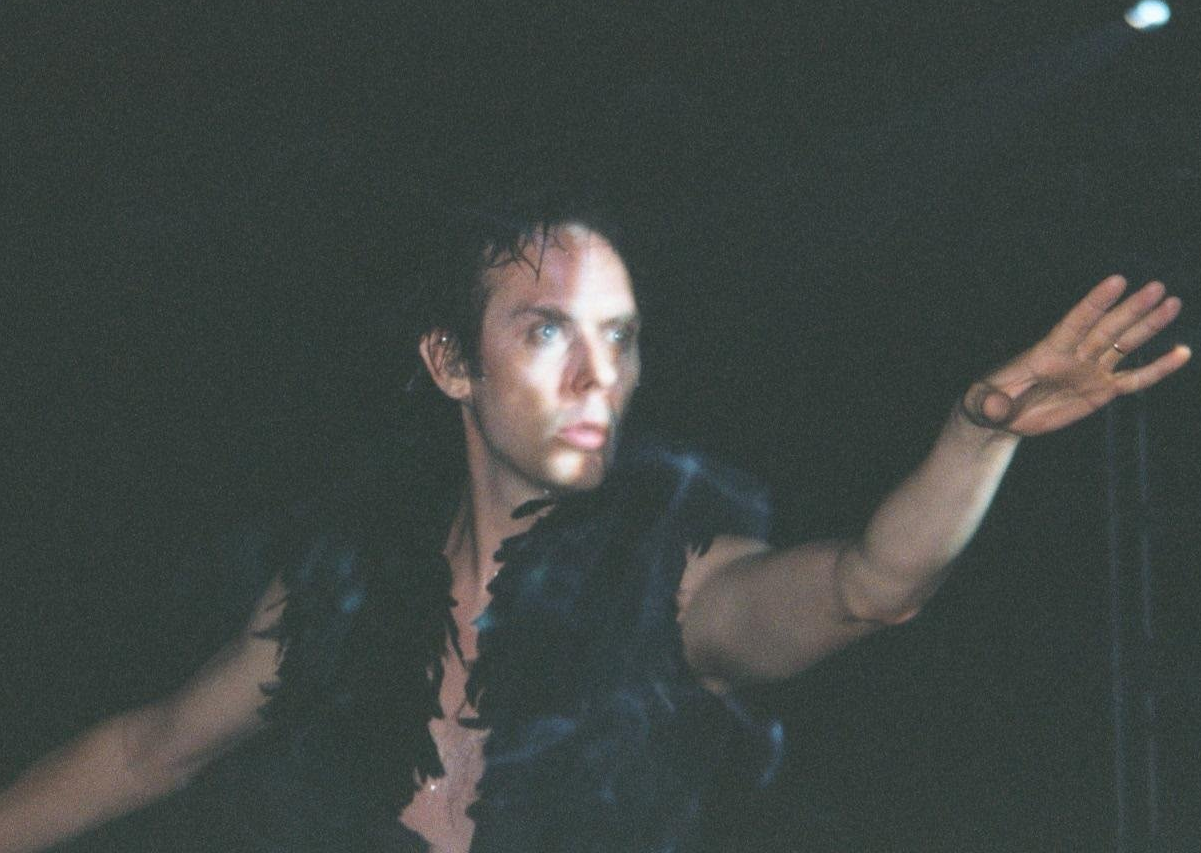
Murphy performing on the 2002 Dust tour

Shortly thereafter, Murphy collaborated with the Turkish artist Mercan Dede on the album Dust (2002). Heavily steeped in traditional Turkish instrumentation and songwriting, coupled with Dede's trademark atmospheric electronics, the album showed Murphy all but abandoning his previous pop and rock incarnations. Dust, released on goth/industrial stalwart label Metropolis Records, alienated many fans who had expected a more uptempo Murphy album (especially post-Recall), but it garnered some critical praise. Murphy considers it his most unusual work to date and is most proud of the song "Your Face" from the album.

In 2004, Murphy signed to yet another new label, Viastar, which was home to several other 1980s pop artists who had moved into more eclectic areas. Despite numerous problems with the label, the album Unshattered was released that year, showcasing Murphy returning to a more pop sound.

Murphy undertook extensive tours of Europe and the US to promote Unshattered in 2005, with a live band featuring guitarist Mark Thwaite, (The Mission, Tricky) on guitar, Jeff Schartoff of Human Waste Project and Professional Murder Music on bass and Justin Bennett of Skinny Puppy on drums. Murphy and the band reconvened in November 2007 for shows in Portugal and Spain, with Nick Lucero replacing Bennett on drums. In May 2008, Murphy recorded a cover of the song "Warm Leatherette" with Trent Reznor and Jeordie White from Nine Inch Nails. This was played live at an intimate studio performance, and the video recording was released on both the official Nine Inch Nails website and on YouTube.

In 2009, Murphy appeared at shows across the United States with Reznor and the band members Reznor had for the Lights in the Sky Over North America 2008 tour. He also appeared with Nine Inch Nails in August 2009 at Terminal 5 as a special guest musician. Additionally, he appeared with Nine Inch Nails on 28 and 29 August at the Aragon Ballroom.

Throughout 2009, Murphy released a series of cover songs exclusively through iTunes. The released songs are "Instant Karma!" (originally by John Lennon), "Space Oddity" (originally by David Bowie), "Transmission" (originally by Joy Division), and "Hurt" (originally by Nine Inch Nails). In support of these releases, Murphy underwent an international tour entitled The Secret Covers Tour. During this time, an additional cover song, "Soul of the World", was released through his official website.

==== 2010—present ====
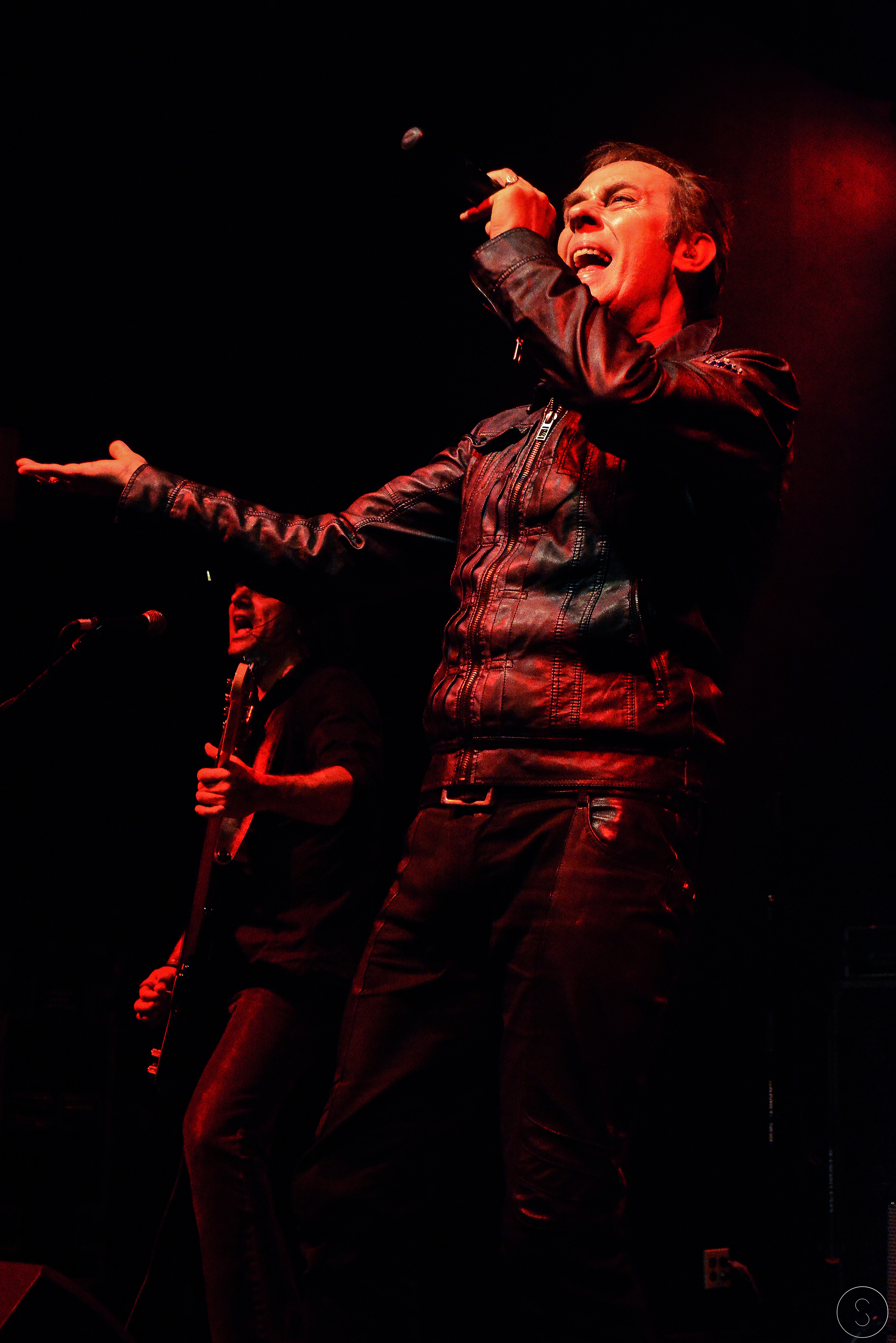
Murphy performing in Barcelona, 2013

In 2010, Murphy made a cameo appearance in The Twilight Saga: Eclipse as "The Cold One". In the summer of 2010, Murphy began his Dirty Dirt Tour in promotion of his studio album Ninth.

In August 2010, on a video blog on his MySpace page, Murphy announced that he was once again going to be working with Mick Karn on a second Dalis Car album, adding that this would be the first time they had seen each other since 1983. Several months prior to this announcement, Karn had been diagnosed with stage-four cancer. The recording session took place in September 2010; however, because of Karn's increasingly severe illness, they only managed to record four songs during the session. Karn died on 4 January 2011 and his website announced that the songs the duo recorded would be released as an EP later in 2011. The finished five-track EP, InGladAloneness, was released in 2012.

In February 2011, Murphy announced a 29-date tour across North America to support his upcoming album, Ninth, released in June 2011. Murphy released the song "I Spit Roses" as a digital single through online retailers in March 2011, as well as single "Seesaw Sway" that May.

In September 2012, Murphy performed a duet with the Comic book writer Stan Lee on the song "That Old Black Magic" for his Comikaze expo.

Starting in April 2013, Murphy toured Europe and the US on the Mr Moonlight Tour, celebrating 35 years of Bauhaus, with longtime guitarist Mark Thwaite, drummer Nick Lucero and bassist Emilio DiZefalo-China. He later replaced guitarist Mark Thwaite (who left the band in September 2013) with Andee Blacksugar in October, who finished out the remaining tour dates in China, Russia, Australia and New Zealand.

In June 2014, Murphy released his tenth studio album, Lion. In June 2015, he released Remixes from Lion, featuring remixes by Youth along with four bonus songs from the Lion recording sessions.

Murphy released his eleventh studio album, Silver Shade, in May 2025.

== Influences ==
The first 7-inch single Murphy bought was "A Hard Day's Night" by the Beatles. In a 2018 interview with The Rockpit, Murphy further elaborated on his musical beginnings:

Well I was like the bookbinder printer-skilled chap, and Danny (Ash) had left school and he went to Art School four years or five years later and I got onto a course there with just one week's worth of work that I'd just scraped together, but I didn't want to go I felt very introverted and didn't want that, it was more about going into that environment. So I internalised and listened to my music. After school everyone had split and gone their own ways, all the friends I had were artists but I was a kid who was interested in a multitude of things, I loved literature, all kinds of things, anything I turned my hand to, but there was no outlet for it. Which is typical because in that fertile earth of Britain where nothing happens a lot comes out you know. So I'd really been listening to music from being a baby, from 1st World War and 2nd World War songs through to Doris Day, then Simon and Garfunkel, Rolling Stones, the Beatles, to all the early Reggae stuff. It was a very musical family in terms of listening and singing, there was lots of music in the house and then in 1966 the Beatles explode and the radio is everywhere. Everywhere you go there's music but on reflection now what's happening is that there's just this generic mush everywhere, you know what I mean? ...But I love to listen to vocal harmonies so there's the Beatles and the Everly Brothers, and voices… Plus there was a very strong influence from Mass, you know the Catholic Mass at school where hymns were always really choral, and that was inspiring even from the first day when I was five. School itself was in this lovely little old building with this high ambient ceiling, a very 'reverb' place a where we sang 'Ave Maria' with this Spanish Teacher who was so inspired to get us to sing. So all this was going on in my head and I didn't have any other context other than loving it, and I would sing all the time."

== Personal life ==
In 1992, Murphy moved to Istanbul with his Turkish wife, Beyhan, who is the head choreographer of the Turkish National Modern Dance group. They have two children, a daughter and a son. In adulthood, Murphy converted from Roman Catholicism to Sufism.

In August 2019, on the eighth night of a two-week residency at New York City's (Le) Poisson Rouge, Murphy was hospitalized at Lenox Hill Hospital for a heart attack. Murphy underwent an angioplasty and had two stents implanted in his heart; he released a statement ten days later that thanked his medical team for saving his life. He stated that he had made a "full recovery" and "was up and running again," sufficiently enough to perform the remaining rescheduled dates in January 2020.

== In popular culture ==
- In 1980, Murphy appeared in a short film called The Grid directed by Joanna Woodward aka JoWonder who was his girlfriend at the time.
- In the early 1980s, Murphy appeared in the "Break the Sound Barrier" advertising campaign for Maxell audio cassettes in the UK.
- The Bulgarian Folk compilation album Le Mystère des Voix Bulgares (The Mystery of Bulgarian Voices) was recommended by Murphy to Ivo Watts-Russell of the indie label 4AD, which licensed and reissued the album, where it garnered worldwide interest.
- In Neil Gaiman's comic book series The Sandman, Dream's face and appearance is based on Murphy. Gaiman explained that Murphy was the original model for Morpheus. Gaiman also stated that Sandman artist Dave McKean based Dream's face on the cover of Sandman No. 1 on Murphy.
- In James O'Barr's comic book The Crow, Eric's face was heavily based on Murphy.
- On May 23, 1995, Murphy was a musical guest on MTV's The Jon Stewart Show, performing his song "The Scarlet Thing in You" and "I'll Fall with Your Knife" to promote his album Cascade.
- In 2008, Murphy appeared as a vocalist in the song "One of a Kind" for season 1, episode 26 of the PBS children's show Mama Mirabelle's Home Movies.

== Discography ==
=== Studio albums ===
- Should the World Fail to Fall Apart (1986) (UK No. 82)
- Love Hysteria (1988) (US No. 135)
- Deep (1989) (US No. 44)
- Holy Smoke (1992) (US No. 108)
- Cascade (1995)
- Dust (2002)
- Unshattered (2004)
- Ninth (2011)
- Lion (2014) (US No. 173)
- Remixes from Lion (2015)
- Silver Shade (2025)

==== Live albums ====
- aLive Just for Love (2001)
- Mr. Moonlight Tour – 35 Years of Bauhaus (2014)
- Wild Birds Live Tour (2015)
- Bare-Boned and Sacred (2017)
- Live in London (2019)
- Peter Live - Volume One - Covers (Silver Shade Records/Cadiz Music) CD, Vinyl LP, Music Cassette (2024)
- Peter Live - Volume Two - Blender Theater At Gramercy NYC 2008 (Silver Shade Records/Cadiz Music) CD, Vinyl LP, Music Cassette (2024)
- Peter Live - Volume Three - 4th & B San Diego 2000 (Silver Shade Records/Cadiz Music) CD, Vinyl LP (2025)
- Peter Live - Volume Four - Metro Chicago 1990 (Silver Shade Records/Cadiz Music) CD, Vinyl LP (2025)

==== Compilations ====
- Wild Birds: 1985–1995 (2000)

=== Singles and EPs ===
| Year | Title | Chart positions | | | | | Album |
| Year | Title | US | US Mod. Rock | US Main. Rock | AUS | UK | Album |
|---|---|---|---|---|---|---|---|
| 1985 | "Final Solution" | – | – | – | – | 92 | Should the World Fail to Fall Apart |
| 1986 | "Blue Heart" | – | – | – | – | – | Should the World Fail to Fall Apart |
| 1986 | "Tale of the Tongue" | – | – | – | – | – | Should the World Fail to Fall Apart |
| 1988 | "All Night Long" | – | – | – | – | 100 | Love Hysteria |
| 1988 | "Blind Sublime" | – | – | – | – | – | Love Hysteria |
| 1988 | "Indigo Eyes" | – | – | – | – | 95 | Love Hysteria |
| 1989 | "The Line Between the Devil's Teeth (And That Which Cannot Be Repeat)" | – | 18 | – | – | – | Deep |
| 1990 | "Cuts You Up" | 55 | 1 | 10 | 96 | – | Deep |
| 1990 | "A Strange Kind of Love" | – | 21 | – | – | – | Deep |
| 1992 | "The Sweetest Drop" | – | 2 | – | – | – | Holy Smoke |
| 1992 | "You're So Close" | – | 18 | – | – | – | Holy Smoke |
| 1992 | "Hit Song" | – | – | – | – | – | Holy Smoke |
| 1995 | "The Scarlet Thing in You" | – | – | – | – | – | Cascade |
| 1995 | "I'll Fall with Your Knife" (promo only) | – | – | – | – | – | Cascade |
| 1997 | Recall EP | – | – | – | – | – | Non-album EP |
| 2009 | "Instant Karma!" | – | – | – | – | – | iTunes Secret Covers |
| 2009 | "Space Oddity" | – | – | – | – | – | iTunes Secret Covers |
| 2009 | "Transmission (Live and Cracklin)" | – | – | – | – | – | iTunes Secret Covers |
| 2009 | "Hurt" | – | – | – | – | – | iTunes Secret Covers |
| 2011 | "I Spit Roses" | – | – | – | – | – | Ninth |
| 2011 | "Seesaw Sway" | – | – | – | – | – | Ninth |
| 2011 | The Secret Bees of Ninth EP | – | – | – | – | – | Non-album EP |
| 2014 | "Hang Up" | – | – | – | – | – | Lion |
| 2014 | "I Am My Own Name" | – | – | – | – | – | Lion |

== Sources ==
- Baddeley, Gavin; Woods, Paul A. (2006). Woods, Paul A. (ed.). Goth Chic: A Connoisseur's Guide to Dark Culture (Second ed.). London, England: Plexus. ISBN 978-0-859-65382-4.
- Jones, Kelly (2004). McCabe, Joseph (ed.). Hanging Out With the Dream King: Conversations with Neil Gaiman and His Collaborators. Seattle, Washington: Fantagraphics. ISBN 978-1-560-97617-2.
- Kilcher, Jewel (2015). Never Broken: Songs are Only Half the Story. New York City, New York: Penguin Publishing Group. ISBN 978-0-399-17433-9.
- Larkin, Colin (2011). The Encyclopedia of Popular Music. London, England: Omnibus Press. ISBN 978-0-857-12595-8.
- McKean, Dave; Gaiman, Neil (1997). The Collected Sandman Covers, 1989–1997. New York City, New York: Watson-Guptill. ISBN 978-0-823-04632-4.
- Romanowski, Patricia; George-Warren, Holly; Pareles, Jon, eds. (1995). Rolling Stone Encyclopedia of Rock & Roll. San Francisco, California: Rolling Stone. ISBN 978-0-684-81044-7.
- Shirley, Ian (1994). Dark Entries: Bauhaus and Beyond. Wembley, England: SAF. ISBN 978-0-946-71913-6.
- Smith, Evans Lansing; Brown, Nathan (2008). The Complete Idiot's Guide to World Mythology. New York City, New York: Penguin. ISBN 978-1-436-26810-3.
- Voger, Mark (2006). The Dark Age. Raleigh, North Carolina: TwoMorrows Publishing. ISBN 978-1-893-90553-5.
