= Ninth (Peter Murphy album) =

Studio album by Peter Murphy
- Released: 7 June 2011
- Studio: Sun Mountain (Boiceville, New York)
- Genres: Alternative rock, gothic rock
- Length: 46:03
- Label: Nettwerk
- Producer: David Baron

Peter Murphy chronology
Unshattered (2004)	Ninth (2011)	Lion (2014)

Singles from Peter Murphy
- 1. "I Spit Roses" Released: 2011; 2. "Seasaw Sway" Released: 2011

Professional ratings
Aggregate scores
Source	Rating
Metacritic	65/100
Review scores
Source	Rating
Allmusic	4/5 stars
The A.V. Club	C
Consequence of Sound	3.5/5 stars
PopMatters	7/10
The Phoenix	3.5/4 stars

Ninth is the ninth solo album, and eighth studio album, by English musician Peter Murphy. Produced by David Baron, the album was released on 7 June 2011 on Nettwerk Records. The first single from the album was "I Spit Roses" coupled with "The Prince & Old Lady Shade", which was released 22 March 2011. The second single, "Seasaw Sway", was also released in 2011.

== Background ==
Speaking with the Los Angeles Times about the album, Murphy said "The whole intention was to really reference that spark and crackle of people playing together in a room. It's about time I reclaimed my legacy . . . It's going 'OK, this is how it's done.' You don't have to spend three years and $4 million on an album. Listen to this. It's full of swagger and immediacy." Speaking with Wired News Murphy described the album as "a continuation of the Go Away White trajectory, it has testosterone pouring out of it. At the same time, it's as beautiful as any female siren."

== Critical reception ==
Upon its release, Ninth received positive reviews from music critics. At Metacritic, which assigns a normalized rating out of 100 to reviews from critics, the album received an average score of 65, which indicates "generally favorable reviews", based on 9 reviews. The Allmusic review by David Jeffries awarded the album 4 stars stating "It's all put together in a right-sized package, too, with no filler to speak of, then wrapped in warm production from David Baron, who finds the proper balance of shadows and light. "The Godfather of Goth" sounds like the genre's savior here, coming on strong with those Bowie-sized aspirations and nailing that attractive Nosferatu-meets-Art-School style." Writing for PopMatters, critic Maria Schurr said "Ninth has a few overindulgently drony moments, but for the most part it is a virile return to form." Consequence of Sound critic David Buchanan said "the album's music lingers in a sonic age when Joy Division still reigned supreme." Critic Jeff Miers said "The first thing you notice about the album is the visceral power of the recording, which producer David Baron has configured as both fittingly modern and timelessly post-rock." in a review for the Buffalo News of New York. Michael Christopher of The Phoenix stated: "Ninth provides a dose of gloom so savory it would bring tears of overwrought emotion to the eyes of contemporaries like Robert Smith and Andrew Eldritch, though it's not exactly a nostalgia trip — more like grown-up melancholy with an aggressive rock streak." while also describing the album as "a striking return to form."

Nevertheless, Jason Heller of The A.V. Club had a mixed opinion on the album, commenting: "Where his menace once oozed, though, it now hiccups." Mojo also described the album as "his most conventional and, frankly, dull album, pursuing a plodding take on alt rock, in the uninteresting middle ground between early U2 and Stiltskin, with occasional dashes of doom-lite."

== Track listing ==
All lyrics written by Peter Murphy; all music composed by Peter Murphy and David Baron, except where noted.

1. "Velocity Bird" – 2:53
2. "Seesaw Sway" – 4:15
3. "Peace To Each" – 3:40
4. "I Spit Roses" – 4:03
5. "Never Fall Out" (Murphy, Paul Statham) – 4:09
6. "Memory Go" – 4:03
7. "The Prince & Old Lady Shade" – 4:44
8. "Uneven & Brittle" (Murphy, Mark Gemini Thwaite) – 4:48
9. "Slowdown" – 3:51
10. "Secret Silk Society" – 4:09
11. "Crème de la Crème" – 5:28

== Personnel ==
- Peter Murphy – vocals, lyrics, arrangement

Additional musicians

- John Andrews - acoustic guitar, electric guitar
- Mark Gemini Thwaite - electric guitar
- Jeff Schartoff - infinite bass guitar
- Nick Lucero - drums
- Darrett Adkins - cello (5, 7, 11)
- Kenji Bunch - viola (5, 7, 11)
- Antoine Silverman - violin (5, 7, 11)
- Cornelius Dufallo - violin (5, 7, 11)
- Kerem Özyeğen - additional guitar (10)

Technical personnel

- David Baron - production, keyboards
- John Siket - engineering, mixing
- Alan Wolmark - management
- Fred Kevorkian - mastering
- Thomas Tadeus Bak - artwork, photography, design

== Charts ==
Chart (2011)	Peak position
US Billboard Independent Albums	38
US Billboard Tastemaker Albums	20
