= Nowhere Girl (song) =

Single by B-Movie

from the album Forever Running
- B-side: "Scare Some Life into Me"
- Released: 2 November 1980, 1982
- Genre: New wave; post-punk
- Label: Some Bizzare, Sire
- Songwriter(s): Steve Hovington, Rick Holliday
- Producer(s): Steve Brown (1982); Steve Stewart-Short (1985)

B-Movie singles chronology
"Remembrance Day" (1980)	"Nowhere Girl" (1980)	"A Letter from Afar" (1984)

"Nowhere Girl" is a single by English new wave band B-Movie. It was originally released on 2 November 1980, and later re-released in 1982, reaching No. 67 in the UK and No. 20 in Sweden. The song has been described as a tale of alienation. It later appeared re-recorded on the band's first studio album, the Sire Records release Forever Running in 1985. It became a chart-topping single across Europe and received much airplay at the time and was performed on the Spanish TV show Tocata. The band also re-recorded the song in 2016 for their newest album Climate of Fear released by Cleopatra Records.

== Charts ==
Chart (1986)	Peak Position
Sweden Singles Chart (Sverigetopplistan)	20
UK Singles (OCC)	67
