= Dust (Peter Murphy album) =

Studio album by Peter Murphy
- Released: 23 April 2002
- Recorded: The Planet, Montreal, Canada; Audeon Studios, Istanbul, Turkey
- Genre: Alternative rock, progressive rock, world, electronic, classical
- Length: 68:09
- Label: Metropolis
- Producer: Peter Murphy, Mercan Dede

Peter Murphy chronology
Cascade (1995)	Dust (2002)	Unshattered (2004)

Dust is the sixth solo studio album by English musician Peter Murphy. It was released on 23 April 2002 through Metropolis Records. Produced by Turkish musician Mercan Dede, Dust utilizes traditional Turkish instrumentation and songwriting, abandoning Murphy's previous pop and rock incarnations, and juxtaposing elements from progressive rock, trance, classical music and Middle Eastern music, coupled with Dede's trademark atmospheric electronics.

Dust features extensive contributions from various Turkish musicians, as well as other musicians such as violinist Hugh Marsh and jazz bassist Jamaaladeen Tacuma. The album also includes re-recorded versions of two songs from earlier in Murphy's career: "Subway" from Cascade (1995) and "My Last Two Weeks" from Love Hysteria (1988). It charted on Billboard Independent Albums, peaking at number 38.

== Critical reception ==
Professional ratings
Aggregate scores
Source	Rating
Metacritic	66/100
Review scores
Source	Rating
Allmusic	4/5 stars
Alternative Press	3.5/5 stars
Q	3/4 stars

Upon its release, Dust received generally positive reviews from music critics. At Metacritic, which assigns a normalized rating out of 100 to reviews from critics, the album received an average score of 66, which indicates "generally favorable reviews", based on 6 reviews. MacKenzie Wilson of Allmusic wrote: "Dust is a stunning look into his exotic, sharp imagination and a vibrant effort for those who've watched him evolve." He also further stated: "Murphy has bravely restructured the simplicities of each song, introducing a massy richness. Dust itself materializes into a new chapter for Murphy." Michael Hubbard of musicOMH stated: "From the beginning of 'Things To Remember', it is clear that ex-Bauhaus frontman Peter Murphy has done more than just move to Turkey. On the evidence of this new album, he now lives and breathes the place.", while describing the record as "one of the most individual albums of the year." Alternative Press described the album as "an emotive, evocative, electrifying mystery," while Q magazine wrote that the album is "perverse, contrary and, on stand-out tracks "No Home Without Its Sire" and "Just For Love", surprisingly engaging."

Will Harris of PopMatters criticized the album, writing: "There are no particular melodies to highlight on Dust, however, and, as a result, it’s just one long drag." He also further expanded his comments, stating: "This is just one big gloomfest, and, to the album’s detriment, Murphy never once opts to crack a smile."

== Track listing ==
All tracks are written by Peter Murphy, except where noted

No.	Title	Writer(s)	Length
1.	"Things To Remember"		7:44
2.	"Fake Sparkle Or Golden Dust?"		8:20
3.	"No Home Without Its Sire"		6:47
4.	"Just For Love"		6:35
5.	"Girlchild Aglow"		7:14
6.	"Your Face"		8:58
7.	"Jungle Haze"		7:36
8.	"My Last Two Weeks"		7:02
9.	"Subway (Epilogue)"	Murphy, Paul Statham	7:36
Total length:			68:09

== Personnel ==
- Peter Murphy - vocals, production, mixing; keyboards (4, 7, 9); programming (3)

Other musicians

- Mercan Dede - production, mixing; percussion (1, 3, 6–7, 9); electronic sound effects (2, 5–9); backing vocals (4); drums (8); turntables (8); samples (3)
- Jamaaladeen Tacuma - bass (1, 3, 5, 7, 9)
- Göksel Baktagir - kanun (1, 5, 8–9)
- Yurdal Tokcan - oud (2, 9); cümbüş (2); fretless guitar (7)
- Hugh Marsh - electric violin (1–2, 4–9); keyboards (7); pizzicato strings (8)
- Scott Russell - drums (1, 2); drum programming (2, 6); keyboards (1)
- Michael Brook - infinite guitar (2, 6–7)
- L. Shankar - tabla (4); dholak (7)
- Matthew Burton - bass (3, 7); programming (3, 7); sound effects (4); didgeridoo (4)
- Ertan Tekin - ney (6, 9)
- Neva Özgen - classical kemençe (4)
- Yelda Özgen - cello (4)
- Jesse Owen-Sims - programming (5); sound effects (5)

Technical personnel

- Orkan Telhan - graphic design
- Daniel Cinelli - engineering, recording, editing, mixing
- Wolfman - mastering
- Tom Tiberio - additional recording
- Kemal Çetinkaya - recording supervision (Istanbul)

== Charts ==
Chart (2002)	Peak position
US Independent Albums (Billboard)	38
