= A Strange Kind of Love =

Single by Peter Murphy

from the album Deep
- Released: July 1990
- Genre: Alternative rock
- Length: 3:51
- Label: Beggars Banquet, RCA
- Songwriter: Peter Murphy
- Producers: Peter Murphy, Simon Rogers

Peter Murphy singles chronology
"Cuts You Up" (1990)	"A Strange Kind of Love" (1990)	"The Sweetest Drop" (1992)

"A Strange Kind of Love" is a song by English musician Peter Murphy, from his third solo studio album, Deep (1989). Produced by Murphy himself and Simon Rogers, it was released as the third single off the album in 1990 through Beggars Banquet and RCA Records.

Even though the song didn't maintain the mainstream success of the previous single, "Cuts You Up", it charted on US Billboard Modern Rock Tracks, peaking at number 21.

== Versions ==
There are up to four different versions of this song:

- A Strange Kind Of Love (Version One): this is the Deep album version. It is based in acoustic guitar, keyboards and vocals, without electric guitars, bass or drums. Length: 3:48

- A Strange Kind Of Love (Version Two): this version is totally different from the version one. Another recording of the song now with drums, bass and guitars from the beginning of the song and different vocal take. It sounds more pop than the Version One. You can find this version in the B side of the singles: "The Line Between the Devil's Teeth" and "Cuts You Up". Also it was released like bonus track in some editions of "Deep". Length: 5:20

- A Strange Kind Of Love (Remix Version): this is the single and video clip version, really it is the Deep album version remixed with drums, electric guitars and bass at the end part of the song. A harder version than the first ones. Length: 3:53

- A Strange Kind of Love (Remix Long Version): this is the extended version of the Remix Version and you can find it in the b side of the single. Length: 5:08

== Music ==
The song mostly features the use of acoustic guitar. Murphy sings first with low intensity. In the mid-song transition, the slightly-reverbed vocals are performed with "more overt projection and power," which were described to be "just enough to give the arrangement a sense of vastness." The song also features a "mournful synth-reed part" towards the song's conclusion, performed by collaborator Paul Statham, described by Ned Raggett of AllMusic as "almost a gentle requiem."

== Critical reception ==
In his review for Deep, Ned Raggett of Allmusic described "A Strange Kind of Love" as "a striking love song, with acoustic guitar and plaintive Statham keyboards supporting one of Murphy's strongest lyrics and performances." In his separate track review, Raggett also described it as "an understated ballad that finds Murphy at his most personal and affecting, one that contrasts greatly with the equally close but musically surging 'Cuts You Up'" and stated that "Strange Kind of Love" is "perhaps one of Murphy's most affecting overall works in solo or group work either way." CD Review magazine wrote that "A Strange Kind of Love" "communicates feelings of hope," in contrast to "the dreary melodies and dark, foreboding rhythms that defined much of Bauhaus' music."

== Track listing ==
U.S. CD
No.	Title	Length
1.	"A Strange Kind of Love (Remix Version)"	3:53
2.	"A Strange Kind of Love"	3:51
3.	"A Strange Kind of Love (Remix Long Version)"	5:08
4.	"All Night Long (Live)"	5:43

Canadian CD
No.	Title	Length
1.	"A Strange Kind of Love (Remix Version)"	3:49
2.	"A Strange Kind of Love"	3:45
3.	"A Strange Kind of Love (Long Remix Version)"	5:05

German 7" vinyl
No.	Title	Length
1.	"A Strange Kind of Love (Radio Version)"	4:00
2.	"A Strange Kind of Love (Version Two)"	5:21

== Personnel ==
- Peter Murphy – vocals, lyrics, mixing, design, production

The Hundred Men

- Terl Bryant – drums, percussion
- Eddie Branch – bass
- Paul Statham – guitar, keyboards
- Peter Bonas – guitar

Technical personnel

- Simon Rogers – production, acoustic guitar, mixing
- Ian Grimble – engineering
- Steve Rooke – mastering
- Alastair Johnson – recording
- Roland Herrington – recording

== Chart performances ==
Chart (1990)	Peak position
US Billboard Modern Rock Tracks	21

== Cover versions ==
- In 2006, Murphy recorded a new live rendition of the song during a Boston radio performance, collaborating with Nine Inch Nails frontman Trent Reznor, bassist Jeordie White and producer Atticus Ross.
- German electronic music act Rotersand covered the song on their 2010 EP, Waiting To Be Born.
- American singer-songwriter Diane Birch covered the song on her 2010 EP, The Velveteen Age, backed up by Phenomenal Handclap Band.
