= Cascade (Peter Murphy album) =

Studio album by Peter Murphy
- Released: 11 April 1995
- Recorded: Recorded at El Cortijo Studios, Andalusia, Spain, Mayfair Studios, London, England.
- Genres: Alternative rock, gothic rock, electronic, ambient, experimental
- Length: 52:49
- Labels: Atlantic, Beggars Banquet
- Producer: Pascal Gabriel

Peter Murphy chronology
Holy Smoke (1992)	Cascade (1995)	Dust (2002)

Singles from Peter Murphy
- 1. "The Scarlet Thing in You" Released: 1995

Cascade is the fifth studio album by English musician Peter Murphy. It was released on 11 April 1995, through Atlantic and Beggars Banquet Records. Produced by Pascal Gabriel, it is Murphy's last album on Beggars Banquet and first album not to feature his backing band, The Hundred Men, which disbanded after Holy Smoke tour.

Murphy embarked a five-week joint North American tour in 1995 with American singer Jewel in support of Cascade and Jewel's debut album, Pieces of You.

== Critical reception ==
Professional ratings
Review scores
Source	Rating
AllMusic	4/5 stars

Ned Raggett of AllMusic was positive in his assessment of the album. Raggett wrote: "Another step further up in Murphy's continuing embrace of generally positive, inspiring work, Cascade shows him once again not repeating himself." Raggett particularly lauded "I'll Fall with Your Knife", calling it "Murphy's best song" and stating that "With a slightly quirky Statham keyboard loop starting things out, it develops from a minimal vocal/electric guitar combination into a huge, skybound declaration of love and devotion. It's Murphy at his most commanding and passionate, and the band's brilliant performance doesn't let up a jot." CMJ reviewer Chris Molanphy described the album as "the sort of stuff MTV used to play after midnight five years ago – groovy, inoffensive, unfashionable and kinda stupid. As guilty pleasures go, you could do a lot worse."

== Track listing ==
All tracks are written by Paul Statham and Peter Murphy except where noted.

No.	Title	Writer(s)	Length
1.	"Mirror to My Woman's Mind"		5:34
2.	"Subway"		4:37
3.	"Gliding Like a Whale"		4:24
4.	"Disappearing"	Murphy	4:54
5.	"Mercy Rain"		3:43
6.	"I'll Fall with Your Knife"		4:31
7.	"The Scarlet Thing in You"		4:24
8.	"Sails Wave Goodbye"		4:44
9.	"Wild Birds Flock to Me"		3:48
10.	"Huuvola"		5:54
11.	"Cascade"		6:08
Total length:			52:49

== Personnel ==
- Peter Murphy – vocals, lyrics, cover concept

Additional musicians

- Anna Ross – backing vocals
- Gary Twigg – bass
- Geoff Dugmore – drums
- Kevin Armstrong – guitar
- Michael Brook – infinite guitar
- Paul Statham – guitar, keyboards, programming

Other personnel

- Pascal Gabriel – production, programming
- Pete Schwier – mixing, engineering
- Shamil Agun – cover art
- Sevil Sert – photography
- Eric Tims – photography
- Stephen Webbon – design

== Charts ==
Chart (1995)	Peak position
CMJ Top 75	21
