= Deep (Peter Murphy album) =

Studio album by Peter Murphy
- Released: 19 December 1989
- Recorded: 1989
- Studio: The Wool Hall (Bath); Rockfield (Rockfield, Wales); Master Rock (London); Abbey Road (London)
- Genre: Alternative rock, gothic rock
- Length: 53:34
- Label: Beggars Banquet
- Producer: Simon Rogers

Peter Murphy chronology
Love Hysteria (1988)	Deep (1989)	Holy Smoke (1992)

Singles from Peter Murphy
- 1. "The Line Between the Devil's Teeth (And That Which Cannot Be Repeat)" Released: November 1989; 2. "Cuts You Up" Released: March 1990; 3. "A Strange Kind of Love" Released: July 1990; 4. "Deep Ocean Vast Sea" Released: September 1990 (Spain only)

Deep is the third solo studio album by English musician Peter Murphy. Produced by Simon Rogers, the album was released on 19 December 1989 through Beggars Banquet Records in the UK and RCA (original issue)/Atlantic Records (reissue) in the US. The album features contributions from Murphy's backing band, The Hundred Men.

The album spawned three singles: "The Line Between the Devil's Teeth (And That Which Cannot Be Repeat)", "Cuts You Up" and "A Strange Kind of Love". The track "Cuts You Up" became a modern rock hit in 1990, spending seven weeks at the top of the U.S. charts and crossing over to Billboard Hot 100, where it peaked at number 55. The other singles also charted on the Modern Rock Tracks chart, peaking at numbers 18 and 21, respectively.

== Critical reception ==
Professional ratings
Review scores
Source	Rating
AllMusic	4.5/5 stars

Ned Raggett of AllMusic praised the album, stating that "Deep showed Murphy balancing mass appeal and his own distinct art with perfection," and also wrote that "Murphy simply sounds like he's having the time of his life, singing both for the sheer joy of it and for the dramatic power of his commanding voice."

== Track listing ==
All tracks are written by Peter Murphy and Paul Statham; except where indicated.

No.	Title	Writer(s)	Length
1.	"Deep Ocean Vast Sea"		4:09
2.	"Shy"		4:36
3.	"Crystal Wrists"		4:09
4.	"Marlene Dietrich's Favourite Poem"		5:21
5.	"Seven Veils"		5:59
6.	"The Line Between the Devil's Teeth (And That Which Cannot Be Repeat)"	Murphy	5:37
7.	"Cuts You Up"		5:27
8.	"A Strange Kind of Love" (Version One)	Murphy	3:48
9.	"Roll Call"		6:35

CD and cassette bonus track
No.	Title	Length
10.	"Roll Call (Reprise)"	8:17

Limited edition CD bonus track
No.	Title	Writer(s)	Length
11.	"A Strange Kind of Love" (Version Two)	Murphy	5:20

== Personnel ==
- Peter Murphy – vocals, lyrics, mixing, design

The Hundred Men

- Terl Bryant – drums, percussion
- Eddie Branch – bass
- Paul Statham – guitar, keyboards
- Peter Bonas – guitar

Other musicians

- Gill Tingay – harp (4)
- Jim Williams – guitar (5)

Technical personnel

- Simon Rogers – production, acoustic guitar; mixing (2, 4–10)
- Ian Grimble – engineering
- Steve Rooke – mastering
- Nick Rogers – mixing (1, 3)
- Paul Cox – photography
- Alastair Johnson – recording
- Roland Herrington – recording

== Charts ==
=== Weekly charts ===
Chart (1990)	Peak position
US Billboard 200	44

=== Singles ===
Song	Peak positions		
Song	US 100	US Mod	US Main
"The Line Between the Devil's Teeth"	—	18	—
"Cuts You Up"	55	1	10
"A Strange Kind of Love"	—	21	—
"—" denotes a release that did not chart.
