= Love Hysteria =

Studio album by Peter Murphy
- Released: March 1988
- Recorded: 1987
- Genre: Alternative rock
- Length: 49:46 (vinyl); 60:08 (CD); 119:06 (2CD re-release)
- Label: RCA/Beggars Banquet
- Producer: Simon Rogers

Peter Murphy chronology
Should the World Fail to Fall Apart (1986)	Love Hysteria (1988)	Deep (1989)

Singles from Love Hysteria
- 1. "All Night Long" Released: 1988; 2. "Blind Sublime" Released: 1988; 3. "Indigo Eyes" Released: 1988

Professional ratings
Review scores
Source	Rating
Allmusic	4/5 stars
Underground	(23/4/3)

Love Hysteria is the second solo album by the British solo artist Peter Murphy, formerly of the gothic rock band Bauhaus. It was released in 1988.

The album was largely written with former B-Movie keyboard player Paul Statham, who had joined Murphy's band, The Hundred Men. It was produced by former member of The Fall, Simon Rogers.

== Critical reception ==
A review at the time of its release in Underground described the album as "a coherent, tuneful package with tracks that are, on the whole, pretty listenable". Ned Raggett, writing for Allmusic, identified a continuing David Bowie influence, but stated that the album "shows Murphy fully coming into his own as a performer".

Looking back on the album retrospectively, Murphy said, "When Love Hysteria came out, people said they were confused by the lyrics. I thought it was fine when I wrote the songs, but then a couple of years later, I read the lyrics and thought, 'This is confusing.'"

== Track listing ==
=== Original 1988 release ===
All songs written by Peter Murphy & Paul Statham; except where noted.

1. "All Night Long" — 5:42
2. "His Circle and Hers Meet" — 6:01
3. "Dragnet Drag" — 5:46
4. "Socrates the Python" — 6:47
5. "Indigo Eyes" — 5:54
6. "Time Has Got Nothing to Do with It" — 5:21
7. "Blind Sublime" (Peter Murphy) — 3:55
8. "My Last Two Weeks" — 6:38
9. "Funtime" (David Bowie, Iggy Pop) — 3:49
- Bonus tracks on CD reissue:
1. "I've Got a Miniature Secret Camera" (Peter Murphy, Eddie Branch) — 4:25
2. "Funtime (Cabaret Mix)" (David Bowie, Iggy Pop) — 5:57

=== 2013 re-release ===
Disc 1

1. "All Night Long" — 5:42
2. "His Circle and Hers Meet" — 6:01
3. "Dragnet Drag" — 5:46
4. "Socrates the Python" — 6:47
5. "Indigo Eyes" — 4:54
6. "Time Has Got Nothing to Do with It" — 5:21
7. "Blind Sublime" — 3:55
8. "My Last Two Weeks" — 6:38
9. "Funtime" (Bowie, Pop) — 3:49

Disc 2

1. "All Night Long" (demo) — 5:23
2. "His Circle and Hers Meet" (demo) — 4:29
3. "Dragnet Drag" (demo) — 5:48
4. "Indigo Eyes" (demo) — 5:35
5. "Blind Sublime" (demo) — 4:09
6. "My Last Two Weeks" (demo) — 5:14
7. "Funtime" (demo) — 3:33
8. "I've Got a Miniature Secret Camera" — 4:25
9. "Funtime (In Cabaret)" — 6:00
10. "All Night Long" (single edit) — 4:36
11. "Indigo Eyes" (single edit) — 4:09
12. "Blind Sublime" (Remix Edit) — 3:50
13. "Blind Sublime" (Blind Beats Mix) — 4:38
14. "Blind Sublime" (Dance Remix) — 7:23

== Personnel ==
- Peter Murphy - vocals, "naive" keyboards
- Fuat Güner, Peter Bonas, Simon Rogers - guitar
- Eddie Branch, Peter Bonas - bass
- Matthew Seligman - fretless bass
- Paul Statham, Simon Rogers - keyboards
- Howard Hughes - piano
- Terl Bryant - drums, percussion
- Ian Grimble – engineer
- Gareth Cousins – assistant engineer
