= Cuts You Up =

1990 single by Peter Murphy

Single by Peter Murphy

from the album Deep
- Released: 1990
- Genre: Alternative rock
- Length: 5:24 (album version); 4:13 (radio edit)
- Label: Beggars Banquet
- Songwriters: Peter Murphy; Paul Statham
- Producer: Simon Rogers

Peter Murphy singles chronology
"The Line Between the Devil's Teeth (And That Which Cannot Be Repeat)" (1989)	"Cuts You Up" (1990)	"A Strange Kind of Love" (1990)

Music video
- "Cuts You Up" on YouTube

"Cuts You Up" is a song by English musician Peter Murphy, released in 1990 by Beggars Banquet Records, as the second single from his third solo studio album, Deep (1989). The song is co written by Murphy with Paul Statham, and produced by Simon Rogers. It became Murphy's most successful release, topping the US Billboard Modern Rock Tracks chart and appearing on the Billboard Hot 100, Cash Box Top 100 and Billboard Album Rock Tracks charts, peaking at numbers 55, 57 and 10. The live versions of the song appear on the B-side of "You're So Close" (1992) single and Alive Just for Love live album, released in 2001.

== Background and recording ==
"Cuts You Up" features a melodic violin line over a bed of acoustic guitars, keyboards, percussion, and bass guitar. Peter Murphy described the song as "having a very driving, acoustic quality to it and lots of sort of hooky, melodic overtones to it with a not-so-straight lyric." Producer Simon Rogers stated that "Murphy brought the song to the sessions in more-or-less its final form," describing it as "pretty much exactly like the demo."

Murphy also visualized the violin part that runs through the performance and used a sample. Rogers recruited a viola player to play the line. Nevertheless, he was not satisfied with the live recording of the strings, stating that "it didn't have the atmosphere and was too moody." The sample was eventually retained for the finished release.

In a 1990 interview, Murphy spent several minutes attempting to explain the song, eventually concluding, "Cuts You Up is about two people who are in love, but not strictly romantically. They're bonded not only emotionally, but also in a spiritual sense."

== Reception ==
=== Commercial ===
"Cuts You Up" was the second single from the record. It became a modern rock hit in United States in 1990, spending seven weeks at the top of the Billboard Modern Rock Tracks chart. It also charted on the Billboard Hot 100, Cash Box Top 100 and Billboard Album Rock Tracks chart, peaking at numbers 55, 57 and 10, respectively. The single sold over 250,000 copies in three weeks in the US. Following its success, Deep reached number 44 on the Billboard 200 album chart. "Cuts You Up" also charted in Canada, peaking at number 41 on the RPM Top Singles chart, and in Australia, where it reached number 96 on the ARIA Singles Chart.

=== Acclaim ===
Ned Raggett of AllMusic described the song as "a love song with solid energy and an inspired vocal" and "a perfect calling card for the album as a whole." Allmusic staff editor Stephen Thomas Erlewine also labeled the song as "Bowie-esque."

Annie Zaleski of Billboard.com described the song as "striking and mysterious" and "Lyrically, the song is poetic and elliptical, with vague references to something profoundly transformative that provokes soul-searching."

In 2018, the track was listed at number nine on Billboard's Greatest of All Time Alternative Songs chart; a 2023 update ranked it at number 13.

The track was also featured as number 40 on PopMatters' "The 100 Greatest Alternative Singles of the ‘80s" list.

== Track listing ==
No.	Title	Length
1.	"Cuts You Up" (Edit)	4:13
2.	"Roll Call (Reprise)"	8:20
3.	"Cuts You Up"	5:24
4.	"A Strange Kind of Love" (Version II)	5:20

== Personnel ==
- Peter Murphy – vocals, lyrics, mixing, design, samples

The Hundred Men

- Terl Bryant – drums, percussion
- Eddie Branch – bass
- Paul Statham – guitar, keyboards
- Peter Bonas – guitar

Technical personnel

- Simon Rogers – production, acoustic guitar; mixing (2-4)
- Ian Grimble – engineering
- Steve Rooke – mastering
- Alastair Johnson – recording
- Roland Herrington – recording
- Nick Rogers – mixing (1)

== Charts ==
Chart (1990)	Peak position
Australia (ARIA)	96
Canada Top Singles (RPM)	41
US Billboard Hot 100	55
US Alternative Airplay (Billboard)	1
US Mainstream Rock Airplay (Billboard)	10
US Cash Box Top 100	57

== See also ==
- Number one modern rock hits of 1990
