= List of the Cult band members =

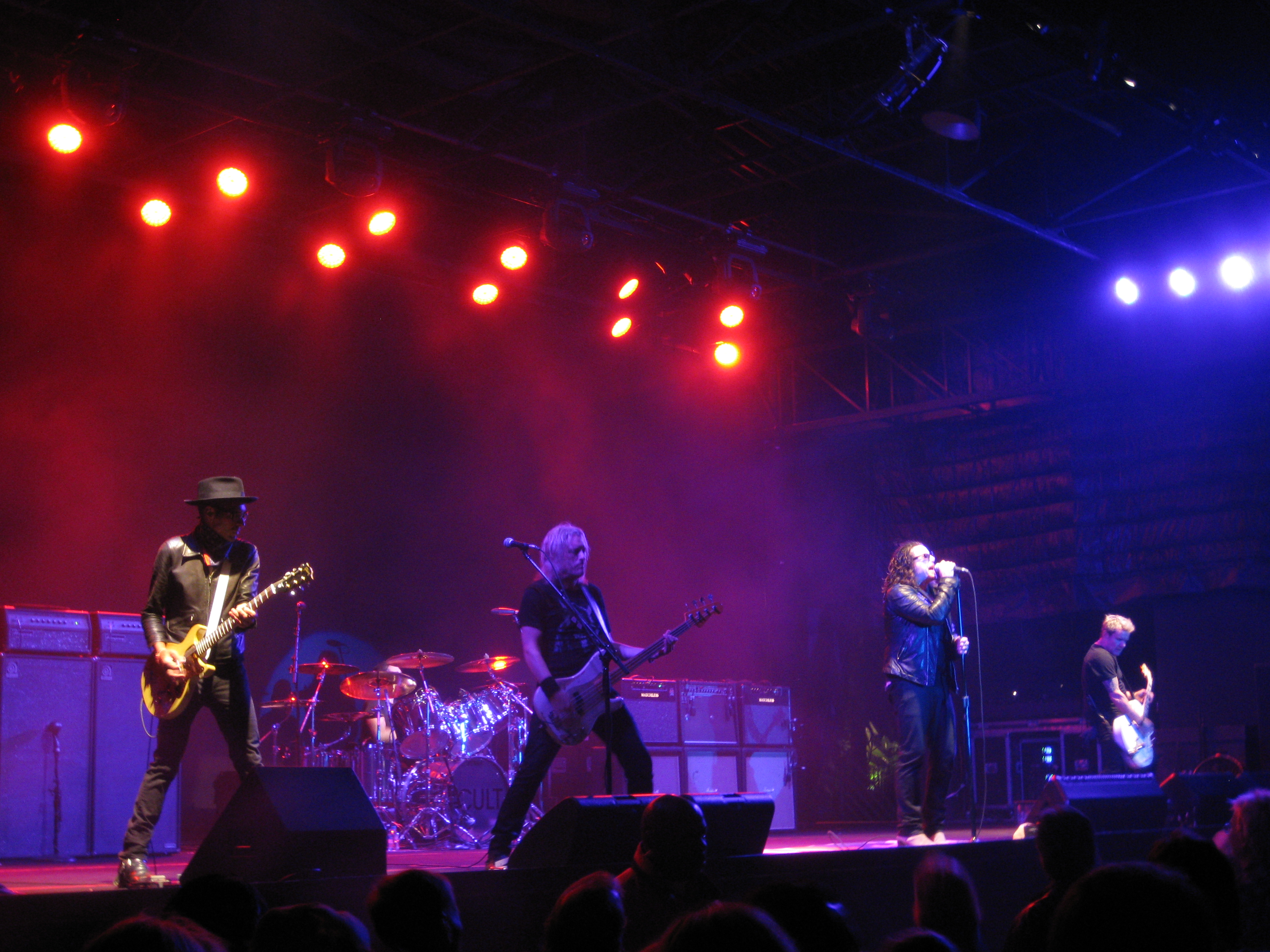
(left to right) Mike Dimkich, John Tempesta, Chris Wyse, Ian Astbury and Billy Duffy

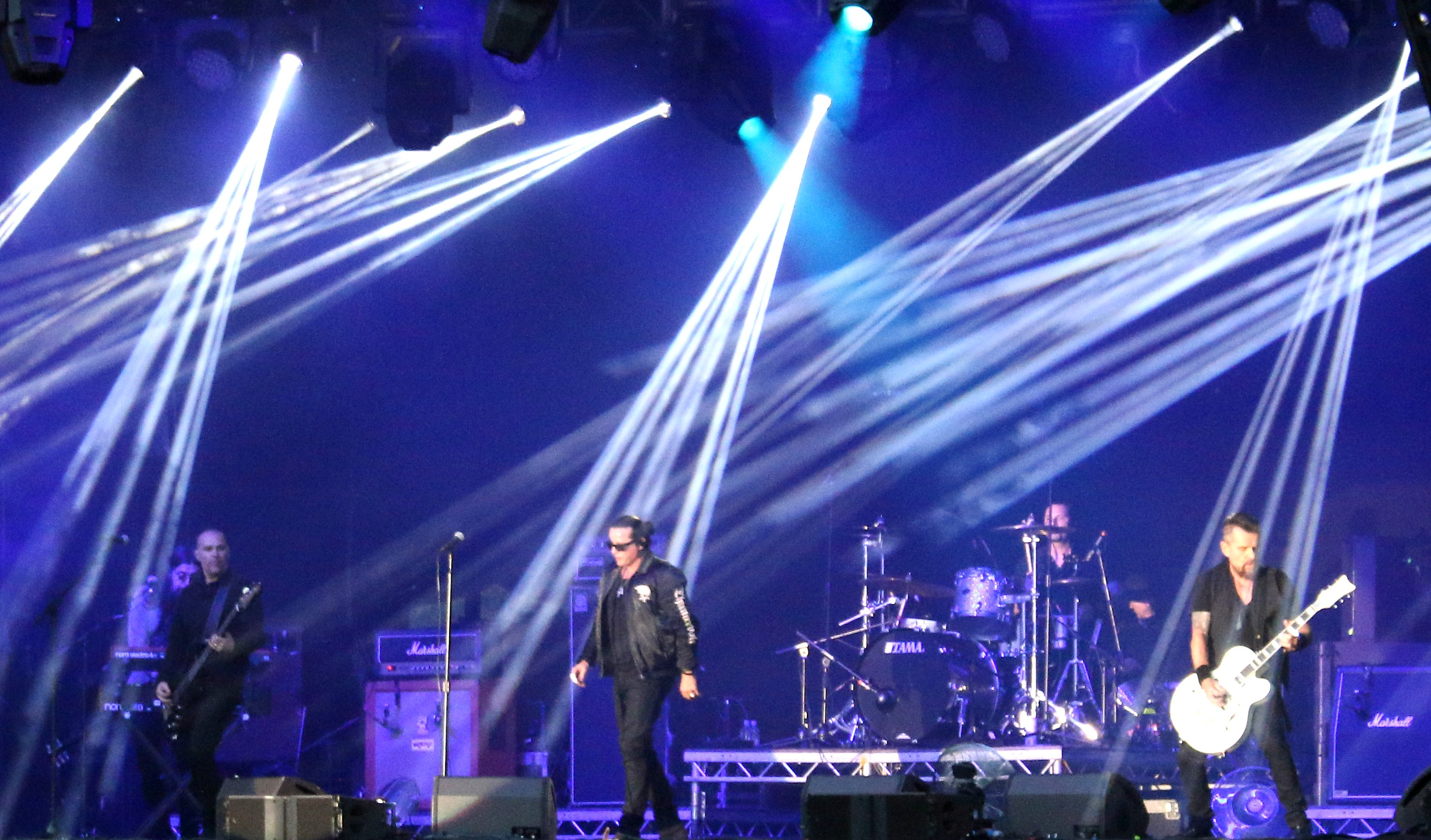
(left to right) Damon Fox, Grant Fitzpatrick, Ian Astbury, John Tempesta and Billy Duffy

Two lineups of The Cult performing 2012 and 2018

The Cult are an English hard rock band from Bradford. Formed in April 1983, the group were originally known as Death Cult, but shortened their name to simply The Cult. They featured vocalist Ian Astbury, guitarist Billy Duffy, bassist Jamie Stewart and drummer Ray "Mondo" Taylor-Smith. The group's current lineup includes Astbury and Duffy, alongside drummer John Tempesta (since 2006), bassist Charlie Jones (since 2020), and keyboardist Mike Mangan (since 2022).

== History ==
=== 1983–1988 ===
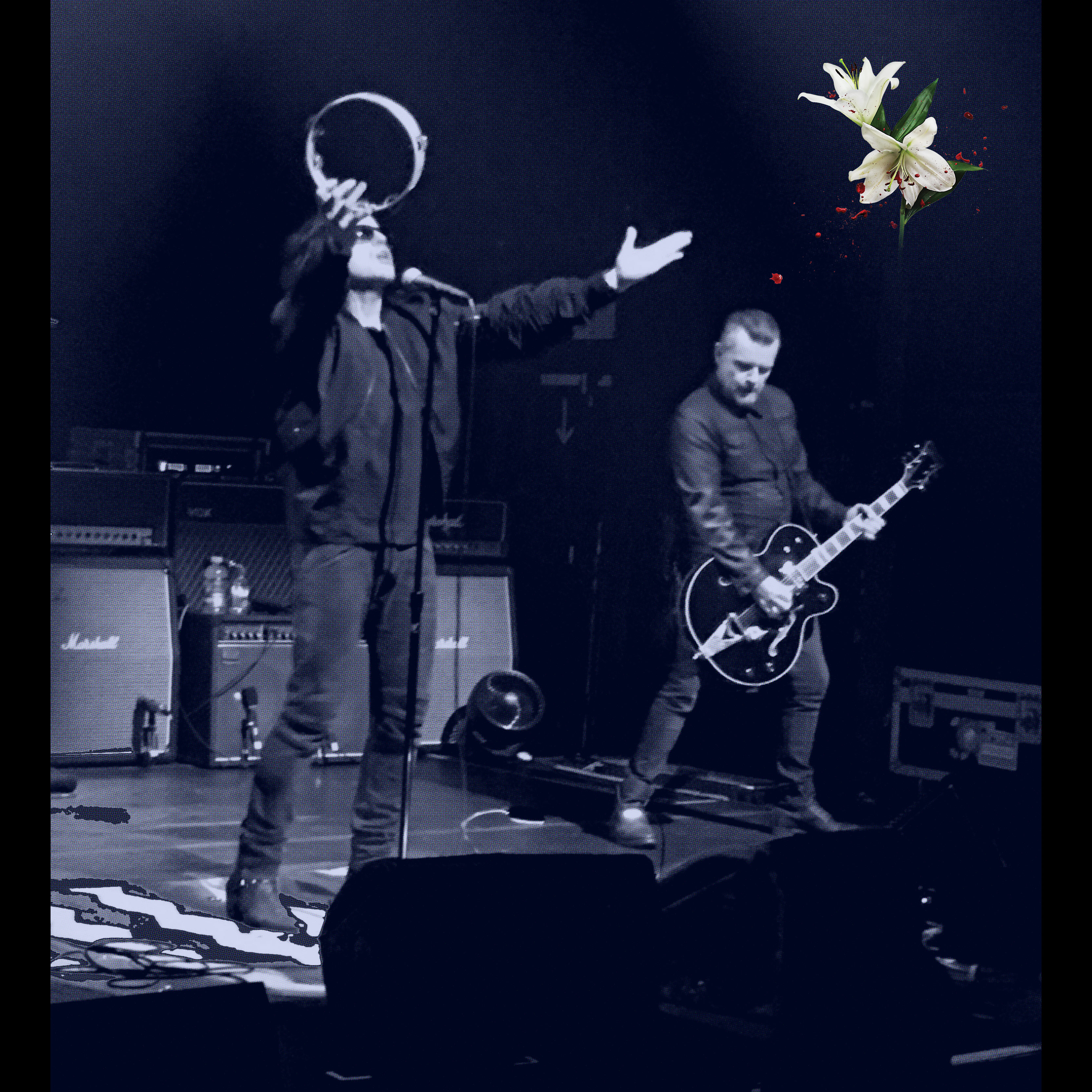
Ian Astbury (left) and Billy Duffy (right) formed Death Cult in April 1983 and are constant members.

Ian Astbury and Billy Duffy formed Death Cult in April 1983, enlisting Ritual members Jamie Stewart and Ray Mondo as a rhythm section to complete the band's initial lineup. After the release of a self-titled debut EP, the group fired Mondo in September and replaced him with Nigel Preston of Sex Gang Children (Mondo took Preston's place in Sex Gang Children). Death Cult issued one more release under their original name, "Gods Zoo", before renaming themselves the Cult in January 1984. The band released their full-length debut Dreamtime in September, early copies of which were packaged with Dreamtime Live at the Lyceum. Another single, "Ressurection Joe", followed at the end of the year. Shortly after the release of "She Sells Sanctuary" in May 1985, Preston was fired from the Cult as he had "become too unreliable".

Mark Brzezicki of Big Country, who had initially substituted for Preston at the filming of the "She Sells Sanctuary" music video after he hadn't shown up, recorded drums for the rest of the 1985 album Love as a session member. During the sessions, Les Warner took over as the band's new permanent drummer. The new lineup recorded a planned third album Peace in late 1986, however the result was scrapped and remained unreleased until it was featured on the 2000 box set Rare Cult. Working with new producer Rick Rubin, the group issued Electric in April 1987. For the album's tour, Stephen "Kid Chaos" Harris from Zodiac Mindwarp and the Love Reaction joined on bass and Stewart switched to guitar. Harris has claimed that he actually contributed to the recording of Electric, having joined the band in January 1987.

=== 1988–1995 ===
After the conclusion of the Electric touring cycle, Harris and Warner were both fired at the beginning of 1988. The group returned to the studio to record several demos, first with Badlands drummer Eric Singer and later with Chris Taylor from producer Bob Rock's group Rock and Hyde, before tracking the final version of Sonic Temple with Mickey Curry of Bryan Adams's band. For the subsequent promotional tour, Matt Sorum was hired on drums after auditioning in addition to Taylor. After the tour ended in April 1990, founding bassist Stewart left the Cult "to concentrate on producing, composing, and spending time with his wife". He was followed in July by Sorum, who was hired to replace Steve Adler in Guns N' Roses. After a brief hiatus, Astbury and Duffy reconvened to record a collection of new demos with bassist Todd Hoffman and drummer James Kottak in early 1991. As with Sonic Temple in 1989, drums on the final version of Ceremony were performed by Mickey Curry, while Keith Richards's bandmate Charley Drayton was brought in to contribute bass.

The Cult returned to touring in October 1991, with Astbury and Duffy joined by bassist Kinley Wolfe and drummer Michael Lee. The tour spawned a live album, Live Cult, which was released in 1993. At the beginning of that year, Wolfe and Lee were replaced by Craig Adams (formerly of the Mission) and Scott Garrett (formerly of Dag Nasty), respectively. Mike Dimkich, formerly of Channel 3, joined the band as touring rhythm guitarist at the same time, before he was replaced by James Stevenson the following year. In between the two tours, the band's core lineup recorded their only album with Adams and Garrett, The Cult, which was released in October 1994. In March 1995, the band cancelled a string of tour dates and broke up, which was attributed primarily to tensions between Astbury and Duffy.

=== Since 1999 ===
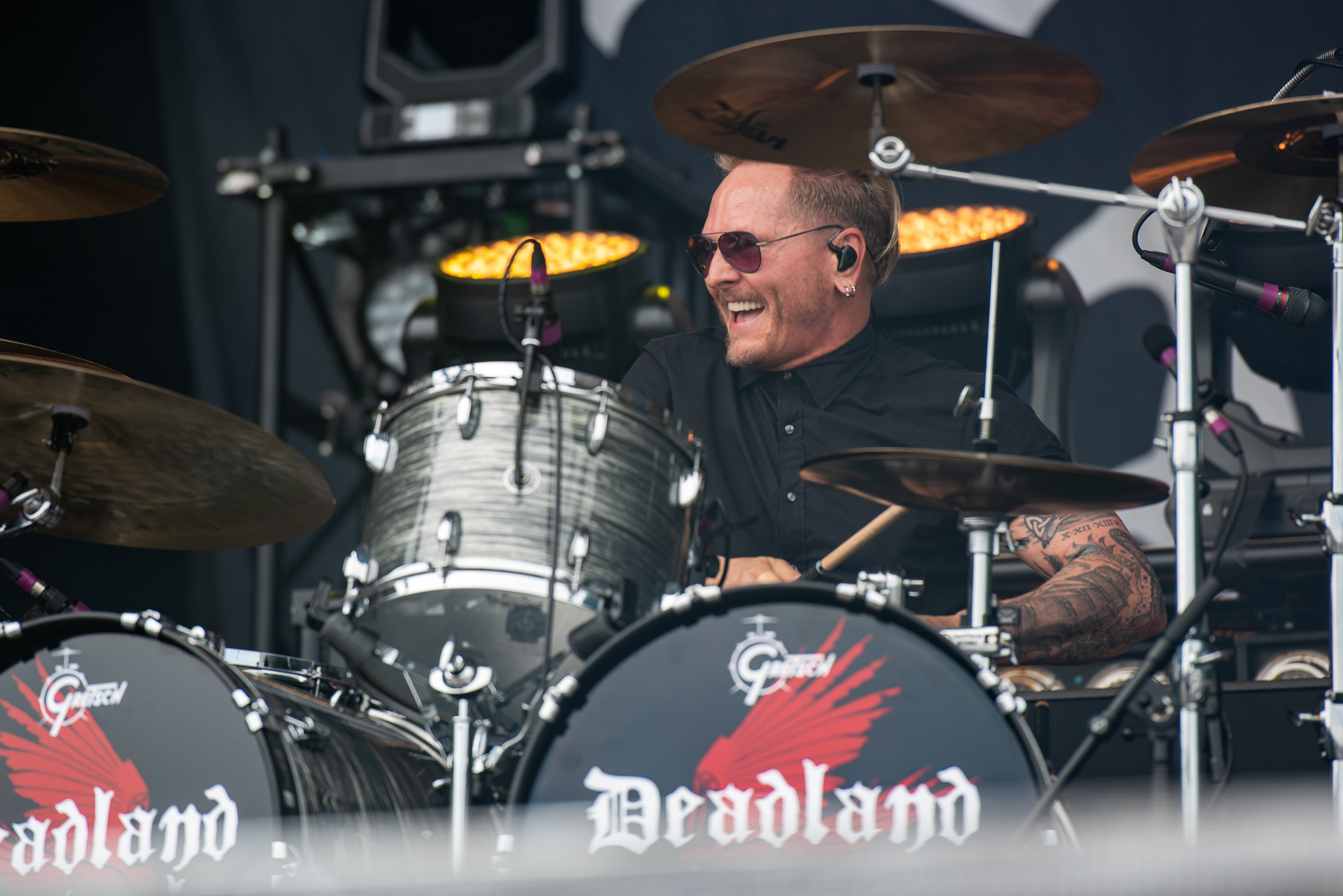
Matt Sorum left the Cult in 1990 to join Guns N' Roses, but later rejoined for the band's 1999–2002 tenure.

After four years away, Astbury and Duffy reformed the Cult in April 1999 with returning drummer Matt Sorum and new bassist Martyn LeNoble. Mike Dimkich also returned as touring rhythm guitarist. LeNoble left after tour dates ending in the summer of 2000, with Chris Wyse taking his place for the bulk of the recording for 2001's Beyond Good and Evil. In preparation for the album's promotional tour, LeNoble was reported in March 2001 to be returning, however by May this had changed to be Billy Morrison in a touring capacity. In February 2002, it was reported that the band had been dropped by their label Atlantic Records and all but disbanded, which according to Sorum was again due to tensions between Astbury and Duffy. After a short tour with returning members Craig Adams and Scott Garrett, the band officially went on hiatus in October.

Following several months of rumours, a second Cult reunion was announced in January 2006, with bassist Chris Wyse and drummer John Tempesta (formerly of Exodus, Testament and more) added to the band's lineup the next month. This lineup remained stable for several years, releasing Born into This in 2007, two singles in 2010, and Choice of Weapon in 2012. In July 2013, touring guitarist Dimkich left to join Bad Religion, with James Stevenson taking his place again. By early 2015, both Stevenson and Wyse had left, with Chris Chaney contributing the majority of bass recordings on the group's 2016 album Hidden City. After the album was finished, the band returned to touring with new members Grant Fitzpatrick on bass and Damon Fox on keyboards and rhythm guitar.

The band released their eleventh studio album Under The Midnight Sun in 2022 which featured new bassist Charlie Jones and session drummer Ian Matthews of Kasabian, the album was also the last (to date) studio appearance of Damon Fox who was replaced by Mike Mangan later in the year.

== Members ==
=== Current ===
Image	Name	Years active	Instruments	Release contributions
	Ian Astbury	1983–1995; 1999–2002; 2006–present	lead vocals; percussion; additional guitars (1993–1994, 2014–2015); songwriting	all Cult releases
	Billy Duffy	1983–1995; 1999–2002; 2006–present	lead and rhythm guitars; backing vocals (1983–1995, 2006–2012); songwriting	all Cult releases
	John Tempesta	2006–present	drums; percussion; songwriting	all Cult releases from Born into This (2007) onwards except Under The Midnight Sun (2022)
	Charlie Jones	2020–present	bass; backing vocals	Under The Midnight Sun (2022)

=== Former ===
Image	Name	Years active	Instruments	Release contributions
	Jamie Stewart	1983–1990	bass; rhythm guitar (1987-1988); keyboards (1985, 1988); backing vocals	all Cult releases from Death Cult (1983) to Sonic Temple (1989); Ghost Dance (1996); Peace (2000); Rare Cult: The Demo Sessions (2002) – all except The Red Zone Demos 1991 and Ceremony Session Mixes 1991
	Ray Mondo (Raymond Taylor-Smith)	1983	drums	Death Cult (1983)
	Nigel Preston	1983–1985 (died 1992)	drums	all Cult releases from "Gods Zoo" (1983) to Love (1985) – one track only on Love; Ghost Dance (1996)
	Les Warner	1985–1988	drums	Electric (1987); Peace (2000); Rare Cult: The Demo Sessions (2002) – The E.Zee Sessions June 1986 and The Hot Nights Demos 1986
	Kid Chaos (Stephen Harris)	1987–1988	bass; backing vocals	none
	Matt Sorum	1989–1990 (touring); 1999–2002	drums; percussion; backing vocals	Beyond Good and Evil (2001); Music Without Fear: Live from the Grand Olympic Auditorium, Los Angeles (2002); Rare Cult: The Demo Sessions (2002) – The Jam Demos 1989
	Kinley "Barney" Wolfe	1991–1993	bass; backing vocals	Live Cult (1993)
	Michael Lee	1991–1993 (died 2008)	drums	Live Cult (1993)
	Scott Garrett	1993–1995; 2002	drums	The Cult (1994)
	Craig Adams	1993–1995; 2002	bass; backing vocals; songwriting	The Cult (1994)
	Martyn LeNoble	1999–2000; 2001	bass	Beyond Good and Evil (2001) – four tracks
	Chris Wyse	2000 (session); 2006–2015	bass; backing vocals	Beyond Good and Evil (2001) – remaining tracks; all Cult releases from Born into This (2007) to Weapon of Choice (2012)
	Grant Fitzpatrick	2015–2020	bass; backing vocals	none
	Damon Fox	2015–2022	keyboards; rhythm guitar (live only); backing vocals	Under The Midnight Sun (2022)

=== Touring ===
Image	Name	Years active	Instruments	Details
	John Webster	1988–1990	keyboards	Webster performed on 1989's Sonic Temple and the subsequent promotional touring cycle through 1990.
	John Sinclair	1991–1993	keyboards	Sinclair joined the Cult's touring lineup following the release of Ceremony, featuring on 1993's Live Cult.
	Mike Dimkich	1993; 1999–2013	rhythm guitar	Dimkich first joined the Cult's touring lineup for the band's 1993 touring cycle. He was replaced by James Stevenson the following year, but returned when the group reformed in 1999 and remained until 2013. During his time with the band Dimkich appeared on the live album Music Without Fear: Live from the Grand Olympic Auditorium, Los Angeles (2002)
	James Stevenson	1994–1995; 2013–2015	rhythm guitar; backing vocals	Stevenson replaced Dimkich for the 1994 tour in promotion of The Cult, and again when he left in 2013.
	Billy Morrison	2001–2002	bass; backing vocals	After the recording of Beyond Good and Evil, Morrison joined the Cult as the band's touring bassist. Morrison appeared on the live album Music Without Fear: Live from the Grand Olympic Auditorium, Los Angeles (2002)
	Mike Mangan	2022–2023	keyboards; backing vocals	Joined for the Under the Midnight Sun tour.

=== Session ===
Image	Name	Years active	Instruments	Details/release contributions
	Mich Ebeling	1984	backing vocals	Dreamtime (1984)
	Mae McKenna	1985	backing vocals	Love (1985)
	Lorenza Johnson	1985	backing vocals	Love (1985)
	Jackie Challenor	1985	backing vocals	Love (1985)
	Mark Brzezicki	1985	drums	"She Sells Sanctuary" music video; Love (1985)
	Eric Singer	1988	drums	Sonic Temple (1989) demos; Rare Cult: The Demo Sessions (2002)
	Chris Taylor	1988	drums	Sonic Temple (1989) demos; Rare Cult: The Demo Sessions (2002)
	Iggy Pop	1988	backing vocals	Sonic Temple (1989)
	Bob Buckley	1988	string arrangement	Sonic Temple (1989)
	Mickey Curry	1988; 1991	drums	Sonic Temple (1989); Ceremony (1991)
	James Kottak	1991 (died 2024)	drums	Ceremony (1991) demos
	Todd Hoffman	1991	bass	Ceremony (1991) demos
	Charley Drayton	1991	bass	Ceremony (1991)
	Tommy Funderburk	1991	backing vocals	Ceremony (1991)
	Donny Gerrard	1991	backing vocals	Ceremony (1991)
	Mona Lisa	1991	backing vocals	Ceremony (1991)
	Yvonne St. James	1991	backing vocals	Ceremony (1991)
	Suzie Katayama	1991	cello	Ceremony (1991)
	Benmont Tench	1991	organ; piano; mellotron	Ceremony (1991)
	Scott Thurston	1991	synthesizer; piano	Ceremony (1991)
	Richie Zito	1991	keyboards; harmonium	Ceremony (1991)
	Alex Acuña	1991	percussion	Ceremony (1991)
	Jim McGiueray	1993–1994	percussion	The Cult (1994)
	Scott Humphrey	1993–1994	keyboards; programming	The Cult (1994)
	Bob Rock	1993–1994; 2014–2015	acoustic guitar; rhythm guitar; additional guitars; bass; songwriting	The Cult (1994); Hidden City (2015)
	Youth	2007	additional bass tracks	Born into This (2007)
	David Nock	2007	additional drum tracks	Born into This (2007)
	Jamie Edwards	2011–2012	keyboards; strings	Choice of Weapon (2012)
	Chris Goss	2011–2012	guitars; backing vocals	Choice of Weapon (2012)
	A.J. Celi	2011–2012	backing vocals	Choice of Weapon (2012)
	Chris Chaney	2014–2015	bass	Hidden City (2015)
	Jamie Muhoberac	2014–2015	piano; keyboards	Hidden City (2015)
	Dan Chase	2014–2015	additional drums	Hidden City (2015)
	Ian Matthews	2020–2022	drums; percussion	Under the Midnight Sun (2022)
	Tom Dalgety	2020–2022	additional guitars; keyboards; songwriting	Under the Midnight Sun (2022)

== Lineups ==
Period	Members	Releases
April – September 1983 (as Death Cult)	Ian Astbury – lead vocals; Billy Duffy – guitars, backing vocals; Jamie Stewart – bass, backing vocals; Ray Mondo – drums	Death Cult (1983)
September 1983 – June 1985 (as Death Cult until January 1984)	Ian Astbury – lead vocals; Billy Duffy – guitars, backing vocals; Jamie Stewart – bass, backing vocals; Nigel Preston – drums, percussion	"Gods Zoo" (1983); Dreamtime (1984); Dreamtime Live at the Lyceum (1984); "Ressurection Joe" (1984); "She Sells Sanctuary" (1985); Ghost Dance (1996); Love (2009) – four bonus tracks
June – July 1985	Ian Astbury – lead vocals; Billy Duffy – guitars, backing vocals; Jamie Stewart – bass, backing vocals, keyboards; Mark Brzezicki – drums (session guest)	Love (1985)
July 1985 – January 1987	Ian Astbury – lead vocals; Billy Duffy – guitars, backing vocals; Jamie Stewart – bass, backing vocals; Les Warner – drums	Electric (1987); Peace (2000); Rare Cult: The Demo Sessions (2002) – The E.Zee Demos and The Hot Nights Demos
January 1987 – early 1988	Ian Astbury – lead vocals; Billy Duffy – lead guitar, backing vocals; Jamie Stewart – rhythm guitar, backing vocals; Les Warner – drums; Kid Chaos – bass, backing vocals	none – Electric tour dates only
Spring – summer 1988	Ian Astbury – lead vocals; Billy Duffy – guitars, backing vocals; Jamie Stewart – bass, backing vocals; Eric Singer – drums (session)	Rare Cult: The Demo Sessions (2002) – The Track Record Demos, June 1988
Summer – fall 1988	Ian Astbury – lead vocals; Billy Duffy – guitars, backing vocals; Jamie Stewart – bass, backing vocals; Chris Taylor – drums (session)	Rare Cult: The Demo Sessions (2002) – The Track Record Demos, August 1988
Fall – late 1988	Ian Astbury – lead vocals; Billy Duffy – guitars, backing vocals; Jamie Stewart – bass, backing vocals, keyboards; John Webster – keyboards (session); Mickey Curry – drums (session)	Sonic Temple (1989)
Spring 1989 – April 1990	Ian Astbury – lead vocals; Billy Duffy – guitars, backing vocals; Jamie Stewart – bass, backing vocals; John Webster – keyboards (touring); Matt Sorum – drums, backing vocals (touring)	Rare Cult: The Demo Sessions (2002) – The Jam Demos, 1989
April – July 1990	Ian Astbury – lead vocals; Billy Duffy – guitars, backing vocals; Matt Sorum – drums, backing vocals	none – band on hiatus
July 1990 – January 1991	Ian Astbury – lead vocals; Billy Duffy – guitars, backing vocals	none – band on hiatus
January – spring 1991	Ian Astbury – lead vocals; Billy Duffy – guitars, backing vocals; Todd Hoffman – bass (session); James Kottak – drums (session)	Rare Cult: The Demo Sessions (2002) – The Red Zone Demos and Ceremony Session Mixes
Spring – summer 1991	Ian Astbury – lead vocals; Billy Duffy – guitars, backing vocals; Charley Drayton – bass (session); Mickey Curry – drums (session)	Ceremony (1991)
October 1991 – January 1993	Ian Astbury – lead vocals; Billy Duffy – guitars, backing vocals; Kinley Wolfe – bass, backing vocals; Michael Lee – drums; John Sinclair – keyboards (touring)	Live Cult (1993)
January – June 1993	Ian Astbury – lead vocals; Billy Duffy – lead guitar, backing vocals; Craig Adams – bass, backing vocals; Scott Garrett – drums; Mike Dimkich – rhythm guitar (touring)	none – Hair of the Underdog tour dates only
Summer 1993 – September 1994	Ian Astbury – lead vocals; Billy Duffy – lead guitar, backing vocals; Craig Adams – bass, backing vocals; Scott Garrett – drums; Bob Rock – rhythm guitar, bass (session); Scott Humphrey – keyboards (session); Jim McGiueray – percussion (session)	The Cult (1994)
September 1994 – March 1995	Ian Astbury – lead vocals; Billy Duffy – lead guitar, backing vocals; Craig Adams – bass, backing vocals; Scott Garrett – drums; James Stevenson – rhythm guitar, backing vocals (touring)	none – Beauty Is on the Streets tour dates only
Band inactive March 1995 – April 1999
April 1999 – fall 2000	Ian Astbury – lead vocals; Billy Duffy – lead guitar; Matt Sorum – drums, backing vocals; Martyn LeNoble – bass; Mike Dimkich – rhythm guitar (touring)	Beyond Good and Evil (2001) – four tracks
Fall – late 2000	Ian Astbury – lead vocals; Billy Duffy – lead guitar; Matt Sorum – drums, backing vocals; Mike Dimkich – rhythm guitar (touring); Chris Wyse – bass (session)	Beyond Good and Evil (2001) – eight tracks
March – May 2001	Ian Astbury – lead vocals; Billy Duffy – lead guitar; Matt Sorum – drums, backing vocals; Mike Dimkich – rhythm guitar (touring); Martyn LeNoble – bass	none – Beyond Good and Evil tour rehearsals only
May 2001 – February 2002	Ian Astbury – lead vocals; Billy Duffy – lead guitar; Matt Sorum – drums, backing vocals; Mike Dimkich – rhythm guitar (touring); Billy Morrison – bass, backing vocals (touring)	Music Without Fear: Live from the Grand Olympic Auditorium, Los Angeles (2002)
August – October 2002	Ian Astbury – lead vocals; Billy Duffy – lead guitar; Mike Dimkich – rhythm guitar (touring); Craig Adams – bass, backing vocals; Scott Garrett – drums	none – tour dates only
Band inactive October 2002 – February 2006
February 2006 – March 2011	Ian Astbury – lead vocals; Billy Duffy – lead guitar; Mike Dimkich – rhythm guitar (touring); Chris Wyse – bass, backing vocals; John Tempesta – drums, percussion	Born into This (2007); "Every Man and Woman Is a Star" (2010); "Embers" (2010)
March 2011 – July 2013	Ian Astbury – lead vocals; Billy Duffy – lead guitar, backing vocals; Chris Wyse – bass, backing vocals; John Tempesta – drums, percussion; Mike Dimkich – rhythm guitar (touring); Jamie Edwards – keyboards, strings (session); Chris Goss – third guitar, backing vocals (session)	Choice of Weapon (2012); Weapon of Choice (2012)
July 2013 – early 2015	Ian Astbury – lead vocals; Billy Duffy – lead guitar; Chris Wyse – bass, backing vocals; John Tempesta – drums, percussion; James Stevenson – rhythm guitar, backing vocals (touring)	none – tour dates only
Early – fall 2015	Ian Astbury – lead vocals; Billy Duffy – lead guitar; John Tempesta – drums, percussion; Bob Rock – rhythm guitar, bass (session); Chris Chaney – bass (session); Jamie Muhoberac – piano, keyboards (session)	Hidden City (2016)
Fall 2015 – August 2022	Ian Astbury – lead vocals; Billy Duffy – lead guitar; John Tempesta – drums, percussion; Damon Fox – keyboards, rhythm guitar, vocals; Grant Fitzpatrick – bass, backing vocals	none – tour dates only
August 2020 – April 2022	Ian Astbury – lead vocals; Billy Duffy – lead guitar; Damon Fox – keyboards; Charlie Jones – bass (session); Tom Dalgety – rhythm guitar, keyboards (session); Ian Matthews – drums, percussion (session)	Under The Midnight Sun (2022)
April 2022 – present	Ian Astbury – lead vocals; Billy Duffy – guitars; John Tempesta – drums, percussion; Charlie Jones – bass, backing vocals; Mike Mangan – keyboards, backing vocals	none to date -
Oct 2023 – present	Ian Astbury – lead vocals; Billy Duffy – guitars; John Tempesta – drums, percussion; Charlie Jones – bass, backing vocals	none to date
