= High Octane Cult =

Compilation album by The Cult
- Released: 5 November 1996
- Recorded: 1984–1995
- Genre: Hard rock
- Label: Beggars Banquet
- Producer: Various

The Cult chronology
The Cult (1994)	High Octane Cult (1996)	Pure Cult: The Singles 1984–1995 (2000)

High Octane Cult is a United States and Japan greatest hits compilation featuring every single The Cult had released at the time, with the additional "Beauty's on the Street" and "In the Clouds". It was released by The Cult's then record company Beggars Banquet Records without The Cult's participation. In the years since its release, singer Ian Astbury and guitarist Billy Duffy have occasionally been vocal about their dislike of this release, with Astbury calling it "sad" on their official website in 2006. Beggars Banquet had planned on using handmade drawings by Ian Astbury for the album's artwork, but when the drawings were lost, the record company subsequently replaced it with less than stellar car photos, and the band photo from The Cult's Sonic Temple record was used in the jacket sleeve, along with a short bio about the band, which guitarist Billy Duffy publicly expressed his disapproval about.

== Reception ==
A negative review in the Sun-Sentinel declared the compilation to be "more fumes than fuel".

== Track listing ==
All songs written by Ian Astbury and Billy Duffy except "In the Clouds", which was written by Ian Astbury, Billy Duffy, Craig Adams.

1. "In the Clouds" (previously unreleased) - 4:00
2. "She Sells Sanctuary" - 4:13
3. "Fire Woman" - 5:12
4. "Lil' Devil" - 2:46
5. "Spiritwalker" - 3:50
6. "The Witch" (single version) - 4:19
7. "Revolution" (single version) - 4:16
8. "Coming Down" (single version) - 4:01
9. "Love Removal Machine" - 4:18
10. "Rain" - 3:56
11. "Edie (Ciao Baby)" (single version) - 4:02
12. "Heart of Soul" (single version) - 4:31
13. "Star" (single version) - 4:00
14. "Wild Flower" - 3:36
15. "Resurrection Joe" (single version) - 4:16
16. "Wild Hearted Son" (single version) - 4:25
17. "Sweet Soul Sister" (single version) - 3:29
18. "Beauty's on the Street" (previously unreleased) - 4:42
