= Rare Cult =

2000 CD box set by the Cult

Box set by The Cult
- Released: 21 November 2000
- Recorded: 1984–1994
- Genre: Rock
- Label: Beggars Banquet
- Producer: John Brand, Chris Kimsey, Steve Brown, Rick Rubin, Tom Werman, Bob Rock, Richie Zito

The Cult chronology
Pure Cult: The Singles 1984–1995 (2000)	Rare Cult (2000)	Beyond Good and Evil (2001)

Rare Cult is a limited edition, six-CD box set (early copies with a seventh bonus disc) from British rock band the Cult, released in November 2000. The chronologically organized set contains 90 tracks (48 previously unreleased) of studio B-sides, radio sessions, 12-inch mixes, alternate mixes, demos and the complete then-unreleased Peace album (also known as the "Manor sessions", later re-released with Electric as Electric Peace). The set is packaged in a matte black box with gold lettering, containing three 2-disc gatefold digipaks and an extensive 80-page booklet of liner notes and photos.

Only 15,000 copies were produced, with only the first 5,000 copies including a bonus seventh disc of remixes. The Rare Cult box set is complemented by the single-disc compilation The Best of Rare Cult and the 2002 5-CD release Rare Cult: The Demo Sessions.

== Track listing ==
All tracks were written by Ian Astbury and Billy Duffy unless otherwise noted.

=== Disc One ===
1. "Ghost Dance" (Radio Session) 3:20
2. "Bad Medicine Waltz" (Radio Session) 4:26
3. "Resurrection Joe" (Radio Session) 5:11
4. "Go West (Crazy Spinning Circles)" (Radio Session) 4:15
5. "Bone Bag" 3:47
6. "Sea And Sky" 3:31
7. "She Sells Sanctuary" (Howling Mix) 8:26
8. "No. 13" 4:41
9. "The Snake" 8:10
10. "(Here Comes the) Rain" 6:19
11. "Little Face" 4:54
12. "Spiritwalker" (Radio Session) 3:57
13. "Revolution" (Radio Session) 6:02
14. "All Souls Avenue" (Radio Session) 4:18
15. "Big Neon Glitter" (Radio Session) 4:35

=== Disc Two ===
1. "Revolution" (Full Length Remix) 5:29
2. "Judith" 5:30
3. "Sunrise" 5:11
4. "All Souls Avenue" 4:46
5. "Electric Ocean" (Original Version) 4:02
6. "Go Go Guru" (Original Version) 4:05
7. "Love Removal Machine" (Radio Session) 4:03
8. "Conquistador" (Radio Session) 2:48
9. "King Contrary Man" (Radio Session) 3:53
10. "Electric Ocean" (Radio Session) 4:10
11. "Zap City" (Demo) 4:45
12. "Love Trooper" (Demo) 3:53
13. "El Progresso" (Demo) 2:45
14. "Peace (Dog)" (Demo) 4:07 – a version of "Peace Dog"
15. "Oink" (Version One) (Demo) 3:51
16. "Waltz" (Demo) 3:49
17. "Untitled (One)" (Demo) 2:50
18. "Groove Co." (Demo) 3:37
19. "Untitled (Two)" (Demo) 2:29

=== Disc Three - The 'Peace' album ===
See also Electric

1. "Love Removal Machine" 5:16
2. "Wild Flower" 4:12
3. "Peace Dog" 5:10
4. "Aphrodisiac Jacket" 4:26
5. "Electric Ocean" 4:14
6. "Bad Fun" 6:26
7. "Conquistador" 2:54
8. "Zap City" 5:16
9. "Love Trooper" 3:57
10. "Outlaw" 5:08
11. "Groove Co." 4:22
12. "Walk My Way" (Jam Session) 8:57

=== Disc Four ===
1. "Wild Flower" (Extended Rock Mix) 5:50 – remix by François Kervorkian and Ron St. Germain
2. "Outlaw" (Alternate Mix) 2:54
3. "Wolf Child's Blues" 7:20
4. "Go Go Guru" (Rubin Version) 3:59
5. "Down So Long" 5:58
6. "Soldier Blue" (Werman Version) 4:39
7. "Zodiac" (Demo) 3:29
8. "Yes Man" (Demo) 5:08
9. "Citadel" (Demo) 4:15
10. "The Crystal Ocean" (Demo) 5:09 – a version of "Electric Ocean"
11. "Lay Down Your Gun" (Version One) (Demo) 6:53
12. "Bite on the Bullet" (Demo) 5:07
13. "Iron Star" (Demo) 4:24
14. "Star Child" (Demo) 3:39
15. "Messin' Up the Blues" 5:45
16. Sonic Temple Radio Promo 0:30 – unlisted track

=== Disc Five ===
1. "Fire Woman" (NYC Rock Mix) 7:21 – remix by Billy Duffy, François Kervorkian, and Goh Hotada
2. "Medicine Train" (Demo) 4:31
3. "New York City" (Demo) 5:01
4. "Sweet Soul Sister" (Rock's Mix) 6:55 – remix by Billy Duffy and Bob Rock
5. "Bleeding Heart Graffiti" 4:59
6. "The River" 6:52
7. "Indian" (Demo) 3:39
8. "Spanish Gold (Version One)" (Demo) 5:51
9. "Host of Angels" (Demo) 5:49
10. "Northern Man" (Demo) 4:53
11. "Auto" (Demo) 3:37
12. "Red Jesus" 4:55
13. "Join Hands" 5:03
14. "Edie (Ciao Baby)" (Acoustic) 4:17
15. "Love Removal Machine" (Live Session) 5:12

=== Disc Six ===
1. "Faith Healer" 5:17 – written by Alex Harvey and Hugh McKenna
2. "Full Tilt" (Live Session) 4:54
3. "Earth Mofo" (Live Session) 4:48
4. "Heart of Soul" (Acoustic) 4:33
5. "The Witch" (Full Version) 6:56
6. "Coming Down (Put the Boot In)" 7:09 – remix by the Butcher Brothers
7. "Breathing Out" 5:59
8. "Gone (Degenerate)" 4:20 – remix by the Butcher Brothers
9. "Down on Me" 5:16
10. "Beauty's on the Street" 4:42
11. "Splunge / Relapse" 5:08
12. "North" 4:36
13. "Sacred Heart" 6:05
14. "In the Clouds" (Alternate Edit) 3:57 – written by Astbury, Duffy, and Craig Adams

=== Bonus Disc Seven - Mixes ===
This bonus CD contains the additional mixes and extended versions released on the original singles and was only available with the initial 5,000 pressings of Rare Cult.

1. "Resurrection Joe" (Long Version) 6:07
2. "Assault on Sanctuary" 7:30 – remix of "She Sells Sanctuary" by the Cult and Steve Brown
3. "Love Removal Machine" (Extended Version) 5:39
4. "Wild Flower" (Guitar Dub) 3:38 – remix by François Kervorkian and Ron St. Germain
5. "Soldier Blue" (Extended Version) 5:59
6. "Fire Woman" (LA Rock Mix) 10:04 – remix by Billy Duffy, Jamie Stewart, and Mike Fraser
7. "The Witch" (Remix) 10:25
8. "Coming Down" (Butchered) 7:08 – remix by the Butcher Brothers
9. "Gone" (Dub Vocal) 5:05
10. "Love Removal Machine" (Small Soldiers Mix) 6:19 – remix by Mickey Petralia
11. "Resurrection Joe" (Hep Cat Mix Long Version) 6:04

== The Best of Rare Cult ==
The Best of Rare Cult

Compilation album by The Cult
- Released: 17 October 2000
- Genre: Rock
- Length: 74.53
- Label: Beggars Banquet
- Producer: Bob Rock, Steve Brown, John Brand, Richie Zito

The Cult chronology
Pure Cult: The Singles 1984–1995 (2000)	The Best of Rare Cult (2000)	Beyond Good and Evil (2001)

The Best of Rare Cult is a single-disc compilation of selected songs from the Rare Cult box set, including five tracks not featured in the box set. The cover artwork by American artist Rick Griffin (of Grateful Dead fame) is adapted from Griffin's original cover for the abandoned 1987 single release for "Soldier Blue." The CD was released on 21 October 2000, before the box set.

=== Track listing ===
1. Love Removal Machine (Peace remix)* - 5.15
2. Zap City - 5.14
3. Faith Healer (written by Alex Harvey and Hugh McKenna) - 5.16
4. She Sells Sanctuary (long version)* - 6.57
5. Edie (Ciao Baby) (acoustic) - 4.16
6. Little Face - 4.53
7. Spanish Gold* - 4.54
8. Love Trooper - 3.54
9. The River - 6.50
10. Lay Down Your Gun (version two) (demo)* - 5.10
11. No.13 - 4.38
12. Bleeding Heart Graffiti - 4.58
13. Sea And Sky - 3.30
14. Go West (Crazy Spinning Circles) (original mix)* - 3.45
15. Join Hands - 5.03
- The * indicates that the song is unavailable on the Rare Cult box set.
- All Songs By Ian Astbury/Billy Duffy unless otherwise stated.
- 'Bleeding Heart Graffiti' is misspelled throughout the album's liner notes as 'Bleeding Heart Graffiti'.

== Rare Cult: The Demo Sessions ==
Rare Cult: The Demo Sessions

Box set by The Cult
- Released: 12 August 2002
- Recorded: 1986–1991
- Genre: Rock
- Label: Beggars Banquet

The Cult chronology
Rare Cult (2000)	Rare Cult: The Demo Sessions (2002)	Born Into This (2007)

Rare Cult: The Demo Sessions is a five-CD box set released in August 2002 including all available demo sessions recorded by The Cult between 1986 and 1991. The set contains 77 tracks, 51 of which were previously unreleased. Only 3,000 numbered copies were available exclusively from the Beggars Banquet online store. The packaging is designed to resemble the previous Rare Cult set, but with images of the actual studio worksheets and tape reels used during the demo sessions.

=== Track listing ===
==== Disc One – The E.Zee Demos ====
Having toured North America during March and April 1986 and played a handful of European dates in May, The Cult returned to the UK that June to play festivals and their own headline date at Brixton Academy in London on 28 June. They had premiered four new songs on a radio session the previous February and attempted to record a new single, Electric Ocean, in Montreal at the start of their North American tour.

Already booked to start recording the following month for their third album at the Manor studios in Oxfordshire, the band took advantage of their time off touring to record demos of songs and rough ideas at E.zee studios in North London.

Though nine of these tracks appeared on the Rare Cult box set, the entire session is included on this release in its proper context, with the unedited introductions and in the order that the songs were recorded.

1. Love Removal Machine 4:44
2. Peace 4:15
3. Zap City 4:46
4. Love Trooper 3:56
5. Angel 5:17
6. Tom Petty 4:02
7. Brown's Gone To Ausy Land 5:58
8. Babywalker 4:13
9. Surf Nazi 3:09
10. Groove Co. (Backing Track) 3:39
11. Oink (Version One) 3:53
12. Oink (Version Two) 3:52
13. Waltz 3:50
14. Blues One 3:03
15. Untitled (1) 2:50
16. El Progresso 2:46
17. Untitled (2) 2:32
18. Groove Co. 3:38

==== Disc Two – The Sonic Temple Demos ====
On 11 June 1988 The Cult entered Track Record studios in Hollywood, CA to record fourteen tracks and on the following day they laid down a further seven. The second session, recorded on 13 August 1988 at Track Record, was the serious pre-production for Sonic Temple, with both producer Bob Rock and engineer Mike Fraser in attendance.

The Track Record Demos - June 1988

1. Medicine Train (One) 4:20
2. New York City (One) 5:19
3. American Horse (One) 5:10
4. Sun King (One) 5:33
5. Automatic Blues 4:53
6. Yes Man 5:13
7. Zodiac 3:31
8. Fire (One) 6:03
9. Wake Up Time For Freedom (One) 4:58
10. Bite On The Bullet 5:11
11. Fred Divinyls 3:44
12. Citadel 4:19
13. The River 6:51
14. The Crystal Ocean 5:07

==== Disc Three – The Sonic Temple Demos ====
The Track Record Demos - June 1988

1. Cashmere 6:51
2. Edie (One) 5:41
3. Bleeding Heart Revival 5:17
4. Lay Down Your Gun (One) 6:58
5. My Love 3:59
6. Iron Star 4:29
7. Star Child 3:42

The Track Record Demos – August 1988

1. Wake Up Time For Freedom (Two) 5:20
2. Lay Down Your Gun (Two) 5:16
3. Medicine Train (Two) 4:34
4. New York City (Two) 5:01
5. Fire (Two) 5:13
6. American Horse (Two) 4:46
7. Sun King (Two) 4:49
8. Edie (Two) 4:32

==== Disc Four – The Ceremony Demos ====
The Red Zone tracks are the pre-production recordings for Ceremony, recorded on 23–25 January 1991. Most of the songs from the finished album sessions are present here, though many would undergo lyrical revision and several have alternate, ‘working’ titles. Recorded live in one take with a scratch rhythm section and featuring rough guide vocals, the tracks provide a raw snapshot of the genesis of the album.

The Red Zone Demos - January 1991

1. Ceremony 6:12
2. Full Tilt 5:07
3. Earth Mother 4:11
4. Crazy Hearted Lover 4:23
5. Friend 6:21
6. Wonderland 7:01
7. Bangkok Rain 5:04
8. Red Eye 5:28
9. Spanish Gold (Take Two) 4:19
10. White 7:20
11. Host Of Angels 5:55
12. Black Cat 5:28
13. Pre-Take Jam 1:15
14. Northern Man 4:56
15. Auto 3:30

==== Disc Five – Demos and Out-Takes ====
===== Hot Nights Demos – October 1986 =====
The Hot Nights demos were discovered on a 7" reel of tape by Billy Duffy, too late for inclusion in the original box set. Neither Duffy nor producer Steve Brown could remember details of the recording which took place in October, 1986.

1. Angel (Lil' Devil) 3:14
2. Upbeat Track 3:58
3. Downbeat Track 4:07

===== Jam Demos – March 1989 =====
Recorded by Craig Thomson and mixed 25–27 March 1989, the Jam demos are the last studio recordings to feature Jamie Stewart and the only tracks featuring Matt Sorum on drums prior to the 2001 release of Beyond Good and Evil. On the tape boxes, the songs are simply titled Track One to Track Eight but the subsequent given titles have been used on the release.

1. Tight Lip (Full Tilt) 4:53
2. Spanish Gold ('89) 5:51
3. White ('89) 4:55
4. Track Four 5:55
5. Indian ('89) 3:41
6. Track Six 5:58
7. Track Seven 5:00
8. Track Eight 3:44

===== The Ceremony Sessions Mixes / Demos – Spring 1991 =====
The Ceremony outtakes were found on working DATs from the sessions.

1. Spanish Gold (Take One) (extra take from demos) 4:08
2. Northern Man (The Witch) (Session Mix) 5:15
3. Host Of Angels (Session Mix) 6:19
4. Sweet Salvation (Session Mix) 6:13
