= Pure Cult =

1993 compilation album by The Cult

Pure Cult: for Rockers, Ravers, Lovers, and Sinners

Greatest hits album by The Cult
- Released: 1 February 1993
- Recorded: 1984–1992
- Genre: Hard rock; gothic rock
- Length: 77:21
- Label: Beggars Banquet
- Producer: Various

The Cult chronology
Ceremony (1991)	Pure Cult: for Rockers, Ravers, Lovers, and Sinners (1993)	The Cult (1994)

Pure Cult: The Singles 1984–1995

Compilation album by The Cult
- Released: 05 June 2000
- Recorded: 1984–95
- Genre: Hard rock; gothic rock
- Length: 77:29
- Label: Beggars Banquet
- Producer: Various

The Cult chronology
High Octane Cult (1996)	Pure Cult: The Singles 1984–1995 (2000)	The Best of Rare Cult (2000)

Pure Cult is the first of several greatest hits compilations by the British rock band The Cult, released in 1993. The title of the original release was Pure Cult: for Rockers, Ravers, Lovers, and Sinners while the 2000 reissue was titled Pure Cult: The Singles 1984–1995.

== Background ==
Released on 1 February 1993. Singer Ian Astbury and guitarist Billy Duffy admitted that they did not have high hopes for this record's release, thinking it would be of interest only to collectors and die hard fans. However, the first week of release it was number one on the British charts and went double platinum, selling over 200,000 copies, which led to it being issued later in several other countries in Europe (where it reportedly reached number one also in Portugal) and Asia.

Released in many forms, either as a single cd compilation of all work up to 1993 or as a double cd with a "Live" disc from a recording at the Marquee Club in November 1991. A four album boxset version included the full greatest hits compilation and live set (but omitting the "amplification breakdown" portion) from the Marquee show, or as a double album containing only the greatest hits compilation. In Poland it was released as a two-cassette tape set, with slightly different artwork, as Pure Cult - For Rockers, Ravers, Lovers, and Sinners, Volumes One and Two.

Some of the various pressings released were:

- In the UK, a two-LP set, consisting of the greatest hits compilation.
- Also in the UK, a four LP box set, consisting of the greatest hits compilation (with the full seven-minute version of "The Witch") and the two LP version of the Marquee Club show, minus the amplification breakdown section.
- Another UK release was a two-CD set, the first disc is the greatest hits compilation (with the four minute version of "The Witch") and the second disc is the first half of the Marquee Club.
- In Portugal and Brazil, it was released as a two-LP set, consisting of the greatest hits compilation.
- In Italy and the Netherlands, it was released as a single cd greatest hits compilation, and also some copies included the second "Live at the Marquee Club" disc. Both versions in Italy and the Netherlands use the four minute version of "The Witch".
- In Poland, it was issued as a two-cassette tape set, with the entire greatest hits compilation and the four minute version of "The Witch", but none of the live album. This version was an unauthorised release.
- In the Philippines, it was issued as a single cassette tape with the entire greatest hits compilation, with the four minute version of "The Witch". It was also reissued on cassette tape again at a later date in the Philippines.
- In Canada, two versions were released on cd, one by Polygram and the other by Beggars Banquet Records. Both versions were nearly identical, except the Polygram version used white lettering on the back cover, whereas and the Beggars Banquet version uses black lettering on the back cover.

Professional ratings
Review scores
Source	Rating
Allmusic	link
AllMusic	(The Singles 1984–1995)
The New Rolling Stone Album Guide	(The Singles 1984–1995)
Release Magazine	6/10 (The Singles 1984–1995)

== Track listing ==
=== Pure Cult: for Rockers, Ravers, Lovers, and Sinners ===
All compositions by Ian Astbury and Billy Duffy.

1. "She Sells Sanctuary"
2. "Fire Woman"
3. "Lil' Devil"
4. "Spiritwalker"
5. "The Witch"*
6. "Revolution"**
7. "Wild Hearted Son"**
8. "Love Removal Machine"
9. "Rain"
10. "Edie (Ciao Baby)"**
11. "Heart of Soul"**
12. "Love"
13. "Wild Flower"
14. "Go West (Crazy Spinning Circles)"
15. "Ressurection Joe"**
16. "Sun King"
17. "Sweet Soul Sister"**
18. "Earth Mofo"

*(4:18 on CD, 7:03 on vinyl only) **(Single version)

- Songs with (*) are single edits, rather than album versions.
- Tracks 4, 14 taken from Dreamtime.
- Tracks 1, 6, 9, 12 taken from Love.
- Tracks 3, 8, 13 taken from Electric.
- Tracks 2, 10, 16, 17 taken from Sonic Temple.
- Tracks 7, 11, 18 taken from Ceremony.
- Track 5 taken from Songs from the Cool World.
- Track 15 (non-album single).

=== Pure Cult: The Singles 1984–1995 ===
All songs written by Ian Astbury and Billy Duffy except "In the Clouds", which was written by Astbury, Duffy and Craig Adams.

1. "She Sells Sanctuary" – 4:12
2. "Fire Woman" – 5:07
3. "Lil' Devil" – 2:44
4. "Spiritwalker" – 3:11*
5. "The Witch" – 4:17*
6. "Revolution" – 4:16*
7. "Love Removal Machine" – 4:17
8. "Rain" – 3:54
9. "In the Clouds" – 3:59
10. "Coming Down (Drug Tongue)" – 4:01*
11. "Edie (Ciao Baby)" – 3:59*
12. "Heart of Soul" – 4:30*
13. "Wild Flower" – 3:37
14. "Star" – 3:59*
15. "Ressurection Joe" – 4:18
16. "Go West" – 3:56
17. "Sun King" – 4:55*
18. "Wild Hearted Son" – 4:24*
19. "Sweet Soul Sister" (video version) – 3:29*
- Songs with (*) are single edits, rather than album versions.
- Tracks 4, 16 taken from Dreamtime.
- Tracks 1, 6, 8 taken from Love.
- Tracks 3, 7, 13 taken from Electric.
- Tracks 2, 11, 17, 19 taken from Sonic Temple.
- Tracks 12, 18 taken from Ceremony.
- Track 5 taken from Songs from the Cool World.
- Tracks 10, 14 taken from The Cult.
- Track 9 taken from High Octane Cult.

== Live Cult ==
Live Cult

Live album by The Cult
- Released: February 1993
- Recorded: 27 November 1991
- Venue: Marquee Club, London, England
- Genre: Rock
- Length: 87:00
- Label: Beggars Banquet
- Producer: The Cult

The Cult live albums chronology
Dreamtime Live at the Lyceum (1984)	Live Cult (1993)

Live Cult was recorded live at the Marquee Club, London on 27 November 1991. The album was originally released in 1993 with the purchase of the Pure Cult: For Rockers, Ravers, Lovers and Sinners. However, only disc one of this two-disc set was included, as well as an order form to purchase disc two. In 2000, the album was re-released with both CDs. According to the liner notes this recording was "completely live" with no overdubs or edits in the final version on CD.

=== Track listing ===
All tracks written by Ian Astbury and Billy Duffy.

Part One

1. "Nirvana" 4:36
2. "Lil' Devil" 2:59
3. "Spiritwalker" 3:53
4. "Horse Nation" 3:52
5. "Zap City" 5:09
6. "Brother Wolf, Sister Moon" 6:41
7. "Revolution" 6:16
8. "Love" 5:58
9. "Rain" 5:21

Part Two

1. "The Phoenix" 4:59
2. "Wild Flower" 4:14
3. "She Sells Sanctuary" 4:36
4. "Full Tilt" 4:48
5. (amplification breakdown) 5:28
6. "Peace Dog" 4:12
7. "Love Removal Machine" 5:52
8. "Earth Mofo" 6:13
9. "Fire Woman" 6:19

The track marked "amplification breakdown" refers to an unplanned break in the show when Billy Duffy's amp stopped working and had to be repaired, while Ian briefly talks with the audience to pass the time and keep the audience from getting angry with the unexpected break in the show.

=== Personnel ===
The Cult

- Ian Astbury – vocals
- Billy Duffy – Guitar
- Kinley Wolfe – Bass
- Michael Lee – drums
- John Sinclair – keyboards

Technical

- Mixed by Chris Sheldon
- Engineered by Gary Stewart

== Charts ==
=== Weekly charts ===
Chart (1993)	Position
Australian Albums (ARIA)	7
Dutch Albums (Album Top 100)	31
German Albums (Offizielle Top 100)	32
New Zealand Albums (RMNZ)	1
Swedish Albums (Sverigetopplistan)	28
UK Albums Chart	1

=== Year-end charts ===
Chart (1993)	Position
New Zealand Albums (RMNZ)	19
UK Albums (OCC)	93

== Certifications ==
=== Pure Cult: for Rockers, Ravers, Lovers, and Sinners ===
Region	Certification	Certified units/sales
Australia (ARIA)	Gold	35,000^{^}
Canada (Music Canada)	2× Platinum	200,000^{^}
^{^} Shipments figures based on certification alone.

=== Pure Cult: The Singles 1984–1995 ===
Region	Certification	Certified units/sales
Canada (Music Canada)	Platinum	100,000^{‡}
^{‡} Sales+streaming figures based on certification alone.
