= BXI (EP) =

EP by Boris and Ian Astbury
- Released: September 2010
- Recorded: 2010
- Studios: Sound Square, Bazooka, Peace Music
- Genre: Alternative rock
- Length: 20:10
- Label: Southern Lord
- Producers: Boris, Ian Astbury

Boris chronology
Variations (2010)	BXI (2010)	Klatter (2011)

Ian Astbury chronology
Spirit\Light\Speed (2000)	BXI (2010)

BXI is a collaborative EP by the Japanese band Boris and the Cult lead vocalist Ian Astbury. The EP was released in September 2010 in CD, black, blue and pink vinyl, and digital formats through Southern Lord Records. Boris and Ian Astbury had performed live together, including on May 30, 2010, at the Sydney Opera House and on September 7, 2010, at the Brooklyn Masonic Temple in Brooklyn, New York.

Professional ratings
Review scores
Source	Rating
Allmusic	3/5 stars
Drowned in Sound	6/10
Pitchfork Media	3.3/10
Popmatters	5/10
The Skinny	4/5 stars
Sputnikmusic	4/5
The Sunday Times	3/5 stars
Washington Times Communities	8.5/10

== Track listing ==
No.	Title	Length
1.	"Teeth and Claws"	5:17
2.	"We Are Witches"	4:13
3.	"Rain" (The Cult cover)	5:01
4.	"Magickal Child"	5:39
Total length:		20:10

== Personnel ==
Per the album liner notes.

- Ian Astbury – vocals, lyrics
- Takeshi – bass guitar, rhythm guitar
- Wata – vocals, lead guitar
- Atsuo – drums, percussion
- Michio Kurihara – guitar on "Rain" and "Magickal Child"

=== Production and design ===
- Tetsuya "Cherry" Tochigi – recording, mixing
- "Fangsanalsatan" – recording, engineering
- Soichiro Nakamura – mixing, mastering
- Tadashi Hamada – artists and repertoire
- André Fromont – Polaroid photography
- Miki Matsushima – BXI photograph
- Stephen O'Malley – design
