= Under the Midnight Sun (disambiguation) =

Under the Midnight Sun may refer to

- Under the Midnight Sun, a studio album by the British rock band The Cult
- Under the Midnight Sun, a 1915 novel in the Corto Maltese series
- Alternative title of Journey Under the Midnight Sun, a 1999 novel by Keigo Higashino
