= Choice of Weapon =

2012 studio album by the Cult

Studio album by The Cult
- Released: 18 May 2012
- Recorded: March 2011–January 2012
- Genre: Hard rock
- Length: 41:40 (Original); 58:10 (Deluxe Edition)
- Label: Cooking Vinyl
- Producer: Chris Goss, Bob Rock

The Cult chronology
Born into This (2007)	Choice of Weapon (2012)	Hidden City (2016)

Choice of Weapon is the ninth album by the British rock band The Cult. The album was initially planned for release in 2011, but the release date was pushed back to May 2012. It was initially released on 18 May in Europe, before being released in the UK on 21 May and then in the US the following day.

Recording sessions for Choice of Weapon began in March 2011 with Chris Goss, who produced the 2010 Capsule EPs. The sessions took place at studios in New York City, Los Angeles, California, and the "California desert". The album was finished in January 2012. During the recording sessions, Bob Rock teamed up with The Cult for the first time since 2001's Beyond Good and Evil and co-produced Choice of Weapon. Choice of Weapon was named iTunes "Rock Album of the Year" in 2012.

This album marks the first and, so far, only time the band did not make any personnel changes over two consecutive albums. However, it would end up being their final album with bassist Chris Wyse.

== Background and recording ==
After a four-year hiatus, The Cult returned in 2006 and released the studio album Born into This in 2007. Although Born into This sold well, The Cult were dropped from Roadrunner Records, and in July 2009, frontman Ian Astbury stated that The Cult would not make any more albums. Asked in September 2009 why The Cult would not make another album, Astbury replied, "It's a dead format; we don't have the attention span for albums. By the time you put it out, it's already been leaked. It's a year-and-a-half worth's of work down the fucking tubes. We need to put out bite-sized chunks." Instead of releasing albums, The Cult released two EPs, titled Capsule 1 and Capsule 2, released in September and November 2010 respectively and the band toured to support them.

During The Cult's concert at the Hammersmith Apollo in London on 21 January 2011, Astbury declared that The Cult would be recording a new album directly after the tour. They announced that they would be working with Chris Goss, who performed with Masters of Reality as a supporting act the same evening. On 11 March 2011, it was announced that The Cult were back in the studio recording the album with Goss. By May, the band had been writing and recording new demos at its Witch Mountain studio hideaway in the Hollywood Hills, and began recording a new album at Hollywood Recording Studios. In October 2011, bassist Chris Wyse stated the album was almost finished and expected to be released in April 2012. Wyse also described it as a "Zep/Stooges mix of energy." On 29 November 2011, it was announced that the album would be produced by Bob Rock, who provided the same role on Sonic Temple, The Cult and Beyond Good and Evil.

The first single from Choice of Weapon, titled "For the Animals", was made available for online streaming via the Rolling Stone website on 23 March 2012, and was released to radio on 26 March.

This album marks the only time the band did not make any personnel changes over two consecutive albums. However, it would end up being their final album with bassist Chris Wyse.

In October 2012, Weapon of Choice, a collection of ten demo tracks, was made available through iTunes.

RECORD STORE DAY 2026 18 April 2026 Available for the first time on vinyl, "Weapon of Choice" Strictly limited to 3,000 copies worldwide. Tracklist A1. Aurora A2. A Pale Horse A3. The Bones A4. Decado A5. Elemental Light B1. Gibraltar B2. Twisted And Bleeding B3. Militant B4. Supreme B5. Lucifer

== Artwork ==
The album cover features an image of a Plains Indian shaman of an unspecified tribe. Astbury stated that he had owned the photograph for many years and chose it for the cover to reflect his long-standing interest in Indigenous cultures, which developed at an early age.

== Reception ==
Professional ratings
Aggregate scores
Source	Rating
Metacritic	76/100
Review scores
Source	Rating
AllMusic	4/5 stars
Premier Guitar	4.5/5

The album debuted at number 15 in Canada and number 36 in USA. In its first week of sales, the album gained the Number 1 spot on the U.K. Rock Chart on 27/05/2012 (according to the Radio 1 Official Chart).

== Track listing ==
All tracks are written by Ian Astbury and Billy Duffy.

No.	Title	Length
1.	"Honey from a Knife"	3:06
2.	"Elemental Light"	4:45
3.	"The Wolf"	3:33
4.	"Life>Death"	5:32
5.	"For the Animals"	4:28
6.	"Amnesia"	3:02
7.	"Wilderness Now"	4:33
8.	"Lucifer"	4:40
9.	"A Pale Horse"	3:14
10.	"This Night in the City Forever"	4:45
Total length:		41:40

Deluxe Edition bonus tracks
No.	Title	Length
11.	"Every Man And Woman Is A Star"	3:26
12.	"Embers"	5:01
13.	"Until The Light Takes Us"	4:19
14.	"Siberia"	3:36
Total length:		58:10

== Personnel ==
The Cult

- Ian Astbury – lead vocals
- Billy Duffy – guitars, backing vocals
- Chris Wyse – bass
- John Tempesta – drums

Additional musicians

- Jamie Edwards – keyboards, strings
- Chris Goss – guitars, backing vocals
- A.J. Celi – backing vocals on "Honey from a Knife"

== Charts ==
Chart (2012)	Peak position
Austrian Albums (Ö3 Austria)	57
Belgian Albums (Ultratop Flanders)	87
Belgian Albums (Ultratop Wallonia)	69
Canadian Albums (Billboard)	15
Dutch Albums (Album Top 100)	32
French Albums (SNEP)	122
German Albums (Offizielle Top 100)	30
Italian Albums (FIMI)	64
Scottish Albums (Official Charts)	18
Spanish Albums (Promusicae)	33
Swedish Albums (Sverigetopplistan)	50
Swiss Albums (Schweizer Hitparade)	42
UK Albums (Official Charts)	20
UK Independent Albums (Official Charts)	6
UK Rock & Metal Albums (Official Charts)	1
US Billboard 200	36
US Independent Albums (Billboard)	9
US Top Hard Rock Albums (Billboard)	3
US Top Rock Albums (Billboard)	17
