= Holy Barbarians =

Holy Barbarians may refer to:

- Holy Barbarians (band), a band formed by former The Cult frontman Ian Astbury
- The Holy Barbarians, a 1959 book by Lawrence Lipton
