= Ceremony (The Cult album) =

1991 studio album by the Cult

Studio album by The Cult
- Released: 23 September 1991
- Recorded: 1991
- Genres: Hard rock; alternative rock
- Length: 63:38
- Labels: Beggars Banquet, Sire
- Producer: Richie Zito

The Cult chronology
Sonic Temple (1989)	Ceremony (1991)	Pure Cult (1993)

Singles from Ceremony
- 1. "Wild Hearted Son" Released: 1991; 2. "Heart of Soul" Released: 1992

Professional ratings
Review scores
Source	Rating
AllMusic	2/5 stars
Metal Hammer	4/5 stars
Q	2/5 stars
Rock Hard	9/10

Ceremony is the fifth studio album by British rock band The Cult, first released on 23 September 1991. The album reached no. 25 at the Billboard 200 charts in the US and no. 9 at the Albums Chart in the UK, and was certified gold in the UK. Ceremony spawned the singles "Wild Hearted Son" and "Heart of Soul".

== Background ==
Ceremony represented a period of great turmoil within the band. Longtime bassist Jamie Stewart had departed prior to recording, and the working relationship between vocalist Ian Astbury and guitarist Billy Duffy was at an all-time low. The pair reportedly rarely agreed to appear at the studio together, opting to record their parts separately at different times.

The album was highly anticipated by both music critics and fans as a result of the band's previous worldwide successes with their 1987 album Electric and its 1989 follow-up Sonic Temple. It was heavily inspired by Native American culture.

The band was sued for $61,000,000 by the parents of the Native American boy pictured on the album cover. In New York, the case against Warner Bros. Records was dismissed in February 1997 for lack of personal jurisdiction. A separate case was filed in the District Court of South Dakota on April 10, 1995, but was terminated on May 16, 1995.

The album reached no. 25 in the US and no. 9 in the UK, while achieving platinum status in Canada and gold in the UK, but sales suffered with the arrival of grunge and time spent dealing with the lawsuit. Some countries, including South Korea and Thailand, did not see the record's release until 1992 and it was unreleased in Turkey until the Cult played several shows in Istanbul in June 1993. It reached #16 on the US Cashbox charts.

== Track listing ==
All tracks are written by Ian Astbury and Billy Duffy.

No.	Title	Length
1.	"Ceremony"	6:27
2.	"Wild Hearted Son"	5:41
3.	"Earth Mofo"	4:42
4.	"White"	7:56
5.	"If"	5:25
6.	"Full Tilt"	4:51
7.	"Heart of Soul"	5:55
8.	"Bangkok Rain"	5:47
9.	"Indian"	4:53
10.	"Sweet Salvation"	5:25
11.	"Wonderland"	6:10
Total length:		63:38

== Track information ==
Both "Ceremony" and "Wild Hearted Son" begin with Native American Indian dances. "White" includes an excerpt from Lawrence Lipton's 1959 book 'The Holy Barbarians', which was later the name of Astbury's band, formed in 1996. "Heart of Soul" begins with the lyric "Down and out in London, Los Angeles, and Paris too", which is a reference to George Orwell's 'Down and Out in Paris and London', with Los Angeles being where the band were based at that time.

"Wild Hearted Son" (UK#40, Canada #41) was the first officially released single, followed by "Heart of Soul" (UK#51). "Sweet Salvation" and "Heart of Soul" were both released as promotional only singles in Argentina in 1992, and "Ceremony" was released as a promotional single in Spain.

== Personnel ==
The Cult

- Ian Astbury – vocals, backing vocals (tracks 1, 2, 5, 6, 8, 11)
- Billy Duffy – guitar

Additional personnel

- Mickey Curry – drums (all tracks)
- Charley Drayton – bass (all tracks)
- Richie Zito – additional keyboards (tracks: 1, 4), keyboards (tracks: 2, 11), harmonium (track 10)
- Benmont Tench – organ (tracks 1, 7, 10), piano (track 5), mellotron (track 4)
- Tommy Funderburk – backing vocals (tracks 1, 2, 5 to 11)
- Scott Thurston – synthesizer and additional piano (track 5)
- Suzie Katayama – cello (track 9)
- Alex Acuña – percussion (tracks 9, 11)
- Donny Gerrard, Mona Lisa, Yvonne St. James – backing vocals (track 10)

Technical

- Mixed by Mike Fraser

== Charts ==
Chart (1991)	Peak position
Australian Albums (ARIA)	7
Canada Top Albums/CDs (RPM)	14
Dutch Albums (Album Top 100)	48
Finnish Albums (The Official Finnish Charts)	6
German Albums (Offizielle Top 100)	38
New Zealand Albums (RMNZ)	3
Swedish Albums (Sverigetopplistan)	21
Swiss Albums (Schweizer Hitparade)	38
UK Albums (Official Charts)	9
US Billboard 200	25

Chart (2019)	Peak position
Scottish Albums (Official Charts)	57
UK Independent Albums (Official Charts)	15
UK Rock & Metal Albums (Official Charts)	3

== Certifications ==
Region	Certification	Certified units/sales
Canada (Music Canada)	Platinum	100,000^{^}
^{^} Shipments figures based on certification alone.
