= Under the Midnight Sun =

Studio album by the Cult
- Released: 7 October 2022
- Recorded: 2020–2022
- Studios: Rockfield Studios, Psalm Studios, Wax Studios, Clearlake Audio, & Anti Machine Machine Studio
- Genres: Hard rock; gothic rock
- Length: 35:02
- Label: Black Hill Records
- Producer: Tom Dalgety

The Cult chronology
Hidden City (2016)	Under the Midnight Sun (2022)

Singles from Under the Midnight Sun
- 1. "Give Me Mercy" Released: 7 July 2022

Under the Midnight Sun is the eleventh studio album by the British rock band the Cult, released on 7 October 2022 through Black Hill Records. The record was produced by Tom Dalgety primarily at Rockfield Studios, where the band had recorded their debut album Dreamtime in 1984.

== Background ==
In a June 2019 interview with LA Weekly, vocalist Ian Astbury stated that the Cult were "long overdue" to release new music, noting that "we do have some stuff we've been working on, but it's yet to see the light of day." Six months later, Astbury told Atlantic City Weekly that the band was going to start working on new music in 2020, saying "we've got a few pieces lying around in various stages of completion. The intention is to get together in the New Year and take a look at what we've got and decide how we are going to go about moving forward. It's an essential part of any creative lifeblood." On May 6, 2020, the Cult announced on their Twitter page that they had signed to Black Hill Records.

On August 15, 2020, guitarist Billy Duffy announced on his Twitter that the band had begun recording with producer Tom Dalgety at Rockfield Studios. Progress was slow for nearly two years, hampered by the COVID-19 pandemic, and the album being recorded remotely, with the half of the band tracking it at Rockfield Studios and Astbury in the United States. In May 2022, Duffy told The Yorkshire Post that the ‘main bulk’ of the album was finished and mastered. On July 7, 2022, the band announced the album title and released "Give Me Mercy" as its first single. Astbury said of the single, "it perfectly fit these thoughts I’d been having about our culture’s need to move past assumptions of duality. We need new language because words can’t express where we’re going."

The album name is said to have come from Astbury's experience during the 1986 Provinssirock festival in Finland. Astbury was quoted recollecting about the event: “It’s three in the morning, the sun’s up, and there’s all these beautiful people in this halcyon moment. People are laying on the grass, making out, drinking, smoking. It was an incredible moment. When the world stopped [for the pandemic], I had this moment to write in real time, to calculate. I was compelled by this vision, this anomaly, this memory, of being under the midnight sun."

The album is the first album since Beyond Good and Evil (2001) not to feature drummer John Tempesta who was absent from the recording sessions for unknown reasons but continued to be a member of the band. Drums on the album were instead provided by Ian Matthews of Kasabian. Tempesta later announced his departure from the group on 7 November 2026.

== Reception ==
Professional ratings
Aggregate scores
Source	Rating
Metacritic	70/100
Review scores
Source	Rating
AllMusic	3/5 stars
Blabbermouth.net	8.5/10
Clash	7/10
Classic Rock	4/5 stars
Distorted Sound	8/10
Mojo	4/5 stars
PopMatters	6/10
The Telegraph	3/5 stars

Under the Midnight Sun has received generally positive reviews from critics. Blabbermouth.net contributor Dom Lawson praised the new album, noting that it "imagines a new strain of muscular rock, where psychedelic string sections, the desert-bound twang of Duffy's guitar and prosaic but gripping melodies drift in and out of the motoring throng." Similarly, Classic Rock writer Dave Everley mentioned that "there are moments [in the album] that are as good as anything the Cult recorded back in their 80s heyday."

On a more critical level, AllMusic writer Thom Jurek commented that the album "is solid but also has a real shortcoming: it lacks musical diversity. Too many of these melodies are similar enough that they're indistinguishable from one another.” Additionally, The Telegraph contributor Nick Ruskell said that “for much of its second half, [the album’s] magic doesn’t catch quite so well." Yet, John Garrat of PopMatters more clearly noted that the album's "second half is sturdier overall, though it lacks the first half’s proportions of highs and lows."

== Track listing ==
All tracks are written by Ian Astbury, Billy Duffy and Tom Dalgety, except where noted.

No.	Title	Writer(s)	Length
1.	"Mirror"		3:48
2.	"A Cut Inside"	Astbury, Duffy	3:59
3.	"Vendetta X"	Astbury, Duffy	3:23
4.	"Give Me Mercy"		3:37
5.	"Outer Heaven"		4:54
6.	"Knife Through Butterfly Heart"	Astbury, Duffy	6:04
7.	"Impermanence"		4:13
8.	"Under The Midnight Sun"		5:04
Total length:			35:02

== Personnel ==
Credits adapted from album's liner notes

- Ian Astbury – vocals, percussion
- Billy Duffy – electric and acoustic guitar
- Charlie Jones – electric and upright bass
- Ian Matthews – drums, percussion
- Damon Fox – grand piano, Fender Rhodes
- Tom Dalgety – additional guitar, keyboards

Technical

- Engineered by Tom Dalgety, Jack Boston, Eric Milos & Scott Ryper
- Mastered by Howie Weinberg

== Charts ==
Chart (2022)	Peak position
Belgian Albums (Ultratop Flanders)	144
Belgian Albums (Ultratop Wallonia)	175
German Albums (Offizielle Top 100)	89
Italian Albums (FIMI)	100
Scottish Albums (Official Charts)	4
Spanish Albums (Promusicae)	71
Swiss Albums (Schweizer Hitparade)	53
UK Albums (Official Charts)	15
UK Album Downloads (Official Charts)	8
UK Independent Albums (Official Charts)	1
UK Rock & Metal Albums (Official Charts)	1
US Top Album Sales (Billboard)	17
