= Spirit\Light\Speed =

Studio album by Ian Astbury
- Released: 20 June 2000
- Recorded: 1998–1999
- Genre: Alternative rock
- Length: 52:11
- Label: Beggars Banquet Records
- Producer: Chris Goss

Professional ratings
Review scores
| Source | Rating |
|---|---|
| AllMusic | https://www.allmusic.com/album/r428293 |

Spirit\Light\Speed is the debut solo studio album by English singer Ian Astbury of the Cult. It was recorded in the late 1990s but sat unreleased until summer of 2000, when it was ultimately released to little fanfare. It included a re-recording of the Cult's song "The Witch".

== Track listing ==
1. "Back on Earth" - 5.00
2. "High Time Amplifier" - 4.23
3. "Devil's Mouth" - 5.51
4. "Tonight (Illuminated)" - 5.47
5. "Metaphysical Pistol" - 4.56
6. "The Witch (Slt Return)" - 4.58
7. "It's Over" - 5.23
8. "El Che / Wild Like a Horse" - 4.59
9. "Tyger" - 5.01
10. "Shambala (R.F.L)" - 5.43

== Single ==
The album spawned the single "High Time Amplifier".

1. "High Time Amplifier" - 3.36
2. "Tyger (Demo Version)" - 6.34
3. "High Time Amplifier (Witchman Mix)" - 4.38

A 12-inch promo version came with four versions of "High Time Amplifier", the Witchman Mix, Album Version, One True Parker Mix and Mental Defectives League Mix.

== Personnel ==
Arranged by, Producer, Written-By, Acoustic Guitar, Electric Guitar, Bass, Keyboards, Backing Vocals, Synthesizer – Chris Goss

Compiled by, Edited by, Producer – PK, Steve Feldman

Executive Producer – Victor Murgatroyd Producer, Programmed by (additional) – Witchman

Recorded by – Martin Schmelzle

Strings – Novi Novog, Stefanie Fifie

Written-By, Arranged By, Producer, Vocals, Electric Guitar, Guitar, Percussion – Ian Astbury

== Notes ==
Recorded and mixed at Monkey Studios

℗ 1973 Electronic University (Alan Watts) Electric University Publishing 'Metaphysical Pistol' contains spoken-word samples from 'Myth and Religion' and 'Democracy In Heaven' by philosopher Alan Watts.

'Tyger' contains a sample of 'Countdown to Nowhere' composed & arranged by Manfred Hübler & Siegfried Schwab.

== See also ==
- Ian Astbury
- The Cult
