= Fire Woman =

1989 single by The Cult

Single by the Cult

from the album Sonic Temple
- B-side: "Automatic Blues"
- Released: 20 March 1989
- Genre: Heavy metal; funk rock
- Length: 5:11
- Label: Beggars Banquet
- Songwriters: Ian Astbury; Billy Duffy
- Producer: Bob Rock

The Cult singles chronology
"Wild Flower" (1987)	"Fire Woman" (1989)	"Edie (Ciao Baby)" (1989)

Professional ratings
Review scores
Source	Rating
Number One	3/5 stars

"Fire Woman" is a song by British rock band the Cult, written by singer Ian Astbury and guitarist Billy Duffy. It was the first single released from their fourth studio album, Sonic Temple, and was subsequently featured on all of the Cult's compilation/greatest hits albums, as well as being a steady fixture of the band's live performances.

"Fire Woman peaked at No. 2 on the US Billboard Modern Rock Tracks chart and No. 46 on the Billboard Hot 100. It also reached No. 1 on New Zealand's Recorded Music NZ (then RIANZ) chart and No. 15 on the UK Singles Chart. Two remixed versions of the song were released as B-sides or promos—the "LA Rock Mix" and the "NYC Rock Mix". Astbury claims the eponymous "fire woman" is a universal symbol, along the lines of a primary element.

== Track listings ==
UK 7-inch single

A Side: "Fire Woman"
B Side: "Automatic Blues"

UK 12-inch single

A Side: "Fire Woman", "Automatic Blues"
B Side: "Messing Up the Blues"
A Side: "Fire Woman (LA Rock Mix)"
B Side: "Fire Woman (NYC Rock Mix)"

== Charts ==
=== Weekly charts ===
Chart (1989)	Peak position
Australia (ARIA)	24
Canada Top Singles (RPM)	22
Europe (Eurochart Hot 100)	46
Ireland (IRMA)	7
Netherlands (Single Top 100)	81
New Zealand (Recorded Music NZ)	1
UK Singles (Official Charts)	15
US Billboard Hot 100	46
US Alternative Airplay (Billboard)	2
US Mainstream Rock (Billboard)	4

=== Year-end charts ===
Chart (1989)	Position
New Zealand (RIANZ)	13
US Album Rock Tracks (Billboard)	9
US Modern Rock Tracks (Billboard)	25

== Certifications ==
Region	Certification	Certified units/sales
Canada (Music Canada)	Platinum	80,000^{‡}
New Zealand (RMNZ)	Gold	15,000^{‡}
^{‡} Sales+streaming figures based on certification alone.

== Cover versions ==
Crush 40, best known for their contributions to Sega's Sonic the Hedgehog video game series, featured a cover of "Fire Woman" as the ninth track on their 2009 compilation album The Best of Crush 40 - Super Sonic Songs and as the tenth track on their first live album, Live!.

== In popular culture ==
- The song was used during the closing credits of every Australian broadcast of the Formula One season since 2007.
- The song was used in the 2013 Doctor Who episode "Journey to the Centre of the TARDIS".
- The song, along with its video, was featured in the first episode of the second season of Beavis and Butt-Head.
- The song was used in the closing credits of the Severance season 2 episode "Sweet Vitriol".
- The song was used in the 2023 horror film, The Pope's Exorcist.
