= Holy Barbarians (band) =

Rock band

- Origin: Liverpool, England
- Genres: Rock; garage rock
- Years active: 1995–1997
- Labels: Beggars Banquet
- Members: Ian Astbury; Patrick Sugg; Matt Garrett; Scott Garrett
- Website: thecult.us

Holy Barbarians was a short-lived rock band formed in 1996 after English frontman Ian Astbury left the Cult. Astbury was joined with three musicians from the United States, guitarist Patrick Sugg along with brothers Matt and Scott Garrett. The band recorded one album, Cream.

Astbury chose the name of the group in reference to the 1959 novel by Lawrence Lipton of the same name. The one album recorded by the group was recorded at Parr Street Studios in Astbury's hometown of Liverpool; it was named Cream after a local club the band frequented during the recording process. Astbury and Sugg wrote the album's songs together, after having first met at a Wayne Kramer show in the United States.

Their album was reasonably well received by music critics, who described it as taking influences from 1960s psychedelic music, mixing it with a rock sound. Promotional videos were shot for the tracks Brothers Fight and Space Junkie and, between February and November 1996, the band toured extensively throughout Europe and North America. After beginning to write a new album in 1997, the band dissolved, with Astbury going on to record a solo record in 1998 (unreleased until 2000) and reforming the Cult in 1999.

== Members ==
- Ian Astbury − vocals, guitar, tambourine
- Patrick Sugg − guitar, backing vocals
- Matt Garrett − bass
- Scott Garrett − drums

== Discography ==
- Cream (May 1996)
1. Brother Fights – 4:21
2. Dolly Bird – 4:08
3. Cream – 5:37
4. Blind – 4:01
5. Opium – 4:39
6. Space Junkie – 3:19
7. She – 4:05
8. You Are There – 4:46
9. Magick Christian – 6:33
10. Bodhisattva – 4:06

== Touring ==
- Holy Barbarians Concert Setlists
