= Sonic Temple =

1989 studio album by the Cult

Studio album by The Cult
- Released: 10 April 1989
- Recorded: September – November 1988
- Studios: Little Mountain Sound Studios, Vancouver
- Genres: Hard rock; heavy metal
- Length: 52:23
- Labels: Beggars Banquet; Sire
- Producer: Bob Rock

The Cult chronology
Electric (1987)	Sonic Temple (1989)	Ceremony (1991)

Singles from Sonic Temple
- 1. "Fire Woman" Released: 20 March 1989; 2. "Edie (Ciao Baby)" Released: 26 June 1989; 3. "Sun King" Released: 6 November 1989; 4. "Sweet Soul Sister" Released: 26 February 1990

Sonic Temple is the fourth studio album by British rock band The Cult, released on 10 April 1989. Produced by Bob Rock, the album features some of the band's most popular songs, including "Fire Woman" and "Edie (Ciao Baby)". Described by guitarist Billy Duffy as "rock music from a European perspective with the sensibilities of punk", Sonic Temple was the last album recorded with longtime bassist Jamie Stewart, who left in 1990, and the first to feature session drummer Mickey Curry.

== Production ==
During 1988, The Cult recorded the first 14-track demo version of Sonic Temple with Eric Singer (later of Kiss) on drums. Later on, they tracked a new demo version of the album, tracking fifteen songs with Chris Taylor, drummer of producer Bob Rock's band Rock and Hyde. However, after things did not work out with Singer and Taylor, Mickey Curry was hired to record the final album.

Recorded at Little Mountain Sound Studios in Vancouver from September to November 1988, Sonic Temple marked the first time the band worked with Rock, who would later produce The Cult, Beyond Good and Evil, Choice of Weapon and Hidden City.

== Musical style ==
While Sonic Temple continued in the hard rock and heavy metal vein of its predecessor Electric, it saw the band lean towards a heavier sound with blues, progressive and arena rock influences.

Duffy's approach to the guitar changed significantly on this album, with the guitarist stating, "I'd come full circle with the Les Paul. (...) I started taking the front off the Les Paul and went back to the natural finish while also playing the wah pedal half-closed like [Mick Ronson]. It was back to guys like Mick Ronson, Mick Ralphs, Thin Lizzy and Jimmy Page."

== Album cover ==
The cover of Sonic Temple features Duffy with his Les Paul in front of a green and red background, partially obscuring a picture of vocalist Ian Astbury. This was chosen to be the album's cover because the band wanted "to capture the essence of what a powerchord felt like."

== Reissues ==
On 4 October 2019, Sonic Temple was re-released as a 5-CD box set and as a 2 LP/1 cassette box set, with a different cover, the original album digitally remastered, numerous rarities, a live album recorded at the London Wembley Arena and a comprehensive booklet featuring rare photos and background info on the album and the band. The LP/cassette edition has a limited release of 3500 copies worldwide.

== Reception ==
=== Critical reception ===
Professional ratings
Review scores
Source	Rating
AllMusic	3.5/5 stars
Classic Rock	8/10
Los Angeles Times	2/5 stars
Mojo	4/5 stars
NME	7/10
Q	4/5 stars
Rolling Stone	3/5 stars
The Rolling Stone Album Guide	3.5/5 stars
Uncut	7/10
The Village Voice	B−

The album received mixed reviews, with some interpreting the change in sound positively and some negatively. John Leland of The New York Times deemed Sonic Temple "both [the Cult's] most conventional album and its most convincing", continuing: "Using a few simple riffs and images, the Cult creates an entire environment, one more exciting and stimulating than our own. Bob Rock, the album's producer, washes blunt, powerful sound over the broadness of most of the band's strokes. Sonic Temple makes a virtue of its lack of subtlety."

In a less enthusiastic review for The Village Voice, Robert Christgau wrote: "Having risen from cultdom as a joke metal band metal fans were too dumb to get, they transmute into a dumb metal band. Dumb was the easy part. Ha ha." Los Angeles Times critic Chris Willman lambasted the album as "stupid". In his book Perfect from Now On, writer John Sellers criticised the Cult for "emulating a hair-metal band" on Sonic Temple, commenting that "the Cult had moved from the hearts of alternative-music fans to the Walkmans of Warrant disciples—completely unacceptable."

Karen Douthwaite of Hi-Fi News & Record Review noticed that the band "recycling the same riffs for the last few albums" and "guitar sound intensified and metallized to AC/DC proportions." Parke Puterbaugh of Stereo Review considered that the band "borrows its inspiration" from Led Zeppelin, Queen and other AOR heroes from the hard rock Seventies, but "there's something perversely addictive about this music, with its upfront aggression and its slow-motion orgasms of drums and guitars building to a raunchy climax."

=== Commercial performance ===
The album reached the Cult's highest chart position in the US, peaking at No. 10 on the Billboard 200 charts, and was certified Platinum by the RIAA in 1990.

=== Accolades ===
Publication	Country	Accolade	Year
Guitar World	US	Top 20 Hair Metal Albums of the Eighties	2015
Ulltimate Classic Rock	US	Top 30 Glam Metal Albums	2021

== Track listing ==
All tracks are written by Ian Astbury and Billy Duffy.

No.	Title	Length
1.	"Sun King"	6:09
2.	"Fire Woman"	5:11
3.	"American Horse"	5:19
4.	"Edie (Ciao Baby)"	4:46
5.	"Sweet Soul Sister"	5:08
6.	"Soul Asylum"	7:26
7.	"New York City"	4:41
8.	"Automatic Blues"	3:51
9.	"Soldier Blue"	4:36
10.	"Wake Up Time for Freedom"	5:17
Total length:		52:23

=== Bonus tracks ===
- "Medicine Train" – 4:42 (On CD, in some countries, cassette release, and 30th Anniversary LP)
- "The River" (Only on Russian, Eastern European, and 30th Anniversary LP pressings)
- "Bleeding Heart Graffiti" (On 30th Anniversary LP)
- "Messin' Up The Blues" (On 30th Anniversary LP)
- "Fire Woman (NYC Rock Mix)" (On 30th Anniversary LP)
- "Edie (Ciao Baby) (Acoustic)" (On 30th Anniversary LP)
- "Lay Down Your Gun" (Version 2) (Only on Russian and Eastern European pressings)

=== Saudi Arabian version ===
There was a Saudi Arabian version released, with the track listing expanded (although "Soul Asylum" had been removed) and slightly rearranged:

1. "Sun King"
2. "Fire Woman"
3. "American Horse"
4. "Edie (Ciao Baby)"
5. "Sweet Soul Sister"
6. "NYC"
7. "Automatic Blues"
8. "Soldier Blue"
9. "Wake Up Time for Freedom"
10. "Medicine Train"
11. "Electric Ocean"
12. "King Contrary Man"
13. "Born to Be Wild"
14. "Outlaw"

== Personnel ==
The Cult

- Ian Astbury – vocals, percussion
- Billy Duffy – guitar
- Jamie Stewart – bass, keyboards

Additional personnel

- Eric Singer – drums during first demo version of Sonic Temple 1988 (credited with "special thanks")
- Chris Taylor – drums during second demo version of Sonic Temple 1988
- Mickey Curry – drums
- Iggy Pop – backing vocals on "New York City"
- John Webster – keyboards
- Bob Buckley – string arrangement on "Edie (Ciao Baby)"

Technical

- Engineered and mixed by Mike Fraser

== Charts ==
Chart (1989)	Peak position
Australian Albums (ARIA)	13
Canada Top Albums/CDs (RPM)	2
Dutch Albums (Album Top 100)	23
Finnish Albums (The Official Finnish Charts)	5
German Albums (Offizielle Top 100)	39
Italian Albums (Musica e Dischi)	13
New Zealand Albums (RMNZ)	6
Swedish Albums (Sverigetopplistan)	13
Swiss Albums (Schweizer Hitparade)	19
UK Albums (Official Charts)	3
US Billboard 200	10

Chart (2019)	Peak position
Scottish Albums (Official Charts)	26
Spanish Albums (Promusicae)	50
UK Independent Albums (Official Charts)	12
UK Rock & Metal Albums (Official Charts)	4

== Certifications ==
Region	Certification	Certified units/sales
Australia (ARIA)	Gold	35,000^{^}
Canada (Music Canada)	2× Platinum	200,000^{^}
United Kingdom (BPI)	Gold	100,000^{^}
United States (RIAA)	Platinum	1,000,000^{^}
^{^} Shipments figures based on certification alone.
