= The Cult (album) =

Studio album by The Cult
- Released: 10 October 1994
- Recorded: 1993–1994
- Studios: Warehouse Studios, Vancouver, British Columbia, Canada
- Genres: Alternative rock; grunge
- Length: 61:39
- Labels: Beggars Banquet, Sire
- Producer: Bob Rock

The Cult chronology
Live Cult (1993)	The Cult (1994)	High Octane Cult (1996)

Singles from The Cult
- 1. "Coming Down (Drug Tongue)" Released: 26 September 1994; 2. "Star" Released: 1994

The Cult is the sixth studio album from English rock band The Cult. It was released in October 1994 on Beggars Banquet Records and is the band's last album on Sire Records in the US. The album is the band's second release with producer Bob Rock self titled, with a Manx Loaghtan black sheep on the front cover. This was The Cult's last album prior to their initial disbandment in the spring of 1995; the band would not release another album until 2001's Beyond Good and Evil.

== Musical style and lyrical themes ==
The style of music on the album is more reminiscent of the grunge and alternative rock music popular at the time, and of noise rock, with its use of distortion and feedback. Vocalist Ian Astbury referred to the record as "very personal, and very revealing" songs about his life, with the subject matter ranging from sexual abuse at the age of 15, to the death of Nigel Preston (friend and former drummer for The Cult), to his directionless years spent in Glasgow in the late 1970s. The album also features a rare occasion of Ian Astbury and Billy Duffy sharing a writing credit with another band member, as bassist Craig Adams is credited as co-writer of "Universal You".

== Reception ==
Professional ratings
Review scores
Source	Rating
Allmusic	3/5 stars

Upon release, the album reached no. 69 on the US charts and no. 21 in the UK, before quickly falling off the charts. Reportedly, it reached number one on the charts in Portugal, but quickly dropped off there as well. The single "Coming Down (Drug Tongue)" (UK#51) was released with the band going on tour in support of the new album. Only one more single, "Star" (UK#65), was officially released. That song began life in 1986 as "Tom Petty" before being dropped by the band during rehearsals. In 1993 the song was resurrected once again as "Starchild", and was finally completed for the record in 1994 as, just simply, "Star".

"Be Free" was also released as a single both in Canada, as a promotional CD with a purchase of a party pack of Labatt Genuine Draft, and in France by Virgin Records as an extremely rare edited version along with the edit of "Coming Down (Drug Tongue)". "Sacred Life" was released as a promotional only single in Spain and the Netherlands.

"Gone" was released as a limited edition (only 2000 made) 7 inch vinyl single with artwork and handwritten lyrics by Ian Astbury.

The Australian version contains an extra CD, with nine songs recorded live at the Marquee Club in London in November 1991.

The album peaked at #64 on the US Cashbox charts.

== Track listing ==
All tracks are written by Ian Astbury and Billy Duffy, except where noted.

No.	Title	Writer(s)	Length
1.	"Gone"		3:50
2.	"Coming Down (Drug Tongue)"		6:36
3.	"Real Grrrl"		4:25
4.	"Black Sun"		6:23
5.	"Naturally High"		4:23
6.	"Joy"		4:46
7.	"Star"		5:02
8.	"Sacred Life"		5:47
9.	"Be Free"		3:48
10.	"Universal You"	Astbury, Duffy, Craig Adams	5:17
11.	"Emperor's New Horse"		4:22
12.	"Saints Are Down"		6:54
Total length:			61:39

== Personnel ==
The Cult

- Ian Astbury – vocals, acoustic guitar, occasional guitar, tambourine
- Billy Duffy – guitar
- Craig Adams – bass
- Scott Garrett – drums

Additional personnel

- Bob Rock – fender and string bass (track 2), acoustic guitar (tracks 3, 8, 12), rhythm guitar (tracks 7, 11), mixing, producer
- Scott Humphrey – keyboards, programming
- Jim McGiueray – percussion

Technical

- Mario Caldato, Jr. – mixing
- George Marino (at Sterling Sound) – mastering

== Charts ==
Chart (1994)	Peak position
Australian Albums (ARIA)	7
Canada Top Albums/CDs (RPM)	12
Dutch Albums (Album Top 100)	61
Finnish Albums (The Official Finnish Charts)	6
German Albums (Offizielle Top 100)	45
New Zealand Albums (RMNZ)	8
Scottish Albums (Official Charts)	31
Swedish Albums (Sverigetopplistan)	21
Swiss Albums (Schweizer Hitparade)	30
UK Albums (Official Charts)	21
UK Rock & Metal Albums (Official Charts)	3
US Billboard 200	69

Chart (2023)	Peak position
Scottish Albums (Official Charts)	24
UK Independent Albums (Official Charts)	11
UK Rock & Metal Albums (Official Charts)	3

== Certifications ==
Region	Certification	Certified units/sales
Canada (Music Canada)	Gold	50,000^{^}
^{^} Shipments figures based on certification alone.
