= Born into This =

Born Into This

Studio album by The Cult
- Released: 1 October 2007
- Recorded: February 2007
- Genre: Hard rock
- Length: 40:57
- Label: Roadrunner
- Producer: Youth

The Cult chronology
Beyond Good and Evil (2001)	Born Into This (2007)	Choice of Weapon (2012)

Professional ratings
Aggregate scores
Source	Rating
Metacritic	58/100
Review scores
Source	Rating
Allmusic	3.5/5 stars
Now Magazine	3/5 stars
Paste	(56/100)
Uncut	4/5 stars

Born into This is The Cult's eighth studio album, and was released on October 2, 2007 in the US, Canada, South Africa, and Sweden. It was released in Hungary, Denmark, Spain and France on 1 October, and in Finland on the 3rd.

== Background and recording ==
Born into This is the follow-up to 2001's Beyond Good and Evil, the band's first reunion album, and also its first (and only) release on Roadrunner Records. It was recorded at Britannia Row Studios in London, with additional recording in Los Angeles and Buenos Aires.

The band initially recorded 13 songs for use on the record, and performed one song, "I Assassin", live on their June 2007 European tour. The first single was "Dirty Little Rockstar", released in mid-August.

A special edition of the album, called the "Savage Edition", containing an extra CD with 5 additional tracks (two demos, two unreleased album outtakes and one full-length version), was also released. The Taiwanese versions were released with an obi strip, and Japanese pressings contains lyrics in Japanese.

It debuted at #72 on the UK album chart the week after its release, and #63 in Italy. In the United States it debuted at #70 on the top 100, #17 on the Top Rock Albums chart. In Canada it debuted at #29, and the Top Alternative Albums chart at #3. In Croatia it debuted at #7. In Germany at #81.

In 2009, citing issues about albums, frontman Ian Astbury said that Born into This would likely be the last studio album released by the band. However, he has since changed his mind and the band released the follow-ups, Choice of Weapon in 2012 and Hidden City in 2016.

On September 7, 2018, the album was released on pink Vinyl, limited to 2000 copies.

== Track listing ==
All tracks are written by Ian Astbury and Billy Duffy.

No.	Title	Length
1.	"Born Into This"	4:04
2.	"Citizens"	4:32
3.	"Diamonds"	4:06
4.	"Dirty Little Rockstar"	3:40
5.	"Holy Mountain"	3:42
6.	"I Assassin"	4:13
7.	"Illuminated"	4:07
8.	"Tiger in the Sun"	5:09
9.	"Savages"	3:54
10.	"Sound of Destruction"	3:30
Total length:		40:57

Savage Edition bonus disc
No.	Title	Length
1.	"Stand Alone"	5:13
2.	"War Pony Destroyer"	4:21
3.	"I Assassin" (Demo)	4:37
4.	"Sound of Destruction" (Demo)	4:25
5.	"Savages" (Full Length Version)	4:32

== Personnel ==
The Cult

- Ian Astbury – vocals
- Billy Duffy – guitar
- Chris Wyse – bass
- John Tempesta – drums

Additional personnel

- Mike Dimkitch – live rhythm guitar
- Youth – additional bass tracks, production
- David Nock – additional drum tracks

== Charts ==
Chart (2007)	Peak position
Australian Albums (ARIA Charts)	121
Dutch Albums (Album Top 100)	71
French Albums (SNEP)	143
German Albums (Offizielle Top 100)	81
Italian Albums (FIMI)	58
Scottish Albums (Official Charts)	81
Spanish Albums (Promusicae)	86
Swedish Albums (Sverigetopplistan)	56
UK Albums (Official Charts)	72
UK Rock & Metal Albums (Official Charts)	3
US Billboard 200	70
US Top Hard Rock Albums (Billboard)	6
US Top Rock Albums (Billboard)	7

== Release history ==
Region	Date
Bulgaria	1 October 2007
Croatia	1 October 2007
Denmark	1 October 2007
France	1 October 2007
Hungary	1 October 2007
Russia	1 October 2007
Spain	1 October 2007
United Kingdom	1 October 2007
Canada	2 October 2007
South Africa	2 October 2007
Sweden	2 October 2007
United States	2 October 2007
Finland	3 October 2007
Australia	10 October 2007
Hong Kong	10 October 2007
Japan	10 October 2007
Malaysia	10 October 2007
Taiwan	10 October 2007
