= Electric (The Cult album) =

Studio album by the Cult
- Released: 6 April 1987
- Recorded: December 1986
- Genres: Hard rock; heavy metal
- Length: 38:51
- Labels: Beggars Banquet; Sire
- Producer: Rick Rubin

The Cult chronology
Love (1985)	Electric (1987)	Sonic Temple (1989)

Singles from Electric
- 1. "Love Removal Machine" Released: 16 February 1987; 2. "Lil' Devil" Released: 20 April 1987; 3. "Wild Flower" Released: 27 July 1987

Electric is the third album by British rock band the Cult, released in 1987. It was the follow-up to their commercial breakthrough Love. The album equalled its predecessor's chart placing by peaking at number four in the UK but exceeded its chart residency, spending a total of 27 weeks on the chart (the most successful run for an album by The Cult).

The album marked a deliberate stylistic change in the band's sound from gothic rock to more traditional hard rock. Rick Rubin, the producer on Electric, had been specifically hired to remake the band's sound in an effort to capitalize on the popularity of hard rock, glam metal and heavy metal in the 1980s. The album was featured in the book 1001 Albums You Must Hear Before You Die.

In 2013, the album was re-released as a double CD set under the title Electric Peace, with one disc featuring the originally released album and the second containing the entire Peace album recorded during the Manor Sessions.

== Production ==
After the breakthrough success of their second album, Love, the Cult began working on a follow-up with producer Steve Brown. In the summer of 1986, they recorded twelve tracks at the Manor Studio in Oxfordshire. These recordings, which came to be known as the Manor Sessions, were to make up a new album, tentatively entitled Peace. According to singer Ian Astbury, the band was dissatisfied with the results of the sessions, stating, "We were in a residential studio in Oxfordshire, packed with booze, unsupervised. It was probably the same for the Stone Roses making The Second Coming. We spent a quarter of a million pounds making an album that sounded like soup."

The Cult travelled to New York with the intention of having Rick Rubin, who was known for producing albums for hip hop artists and thrash metal band Slayer, remix one of the tracks. Rubin criticized the use of guitar effects used in the band's previous records for being "way too overblown." Rubin instead asked the band if they would be interested in recording something more akin to AC/DC or early Led Zeppelin. According to Astbury, "Rick asked us: 'Do you guys wanna make English pussy music, or do you want to rock?' When it’s thrown down like that, in New York, you’re like, 'We wanna rip the speakers out.'"

The band opted to re-record all tracks with Rubin as producer. As per Rubin's hard rock-oriented vision for the album, Billy Duffy played a Gibson Les Paul guitar through a Marshall amplifier on the album and, according to the guitarist, "no effects pedals [were] allowed apart from wah-wah.'" Duffy has maintained that the change in sound was organic, stating, "The Cult's always been a riff-driven band, even in the early stages with the Death Cult and Southern Death Cult, it was just that we started to get into the more forbidden fruit, which was blues-rock riffs. It changed the rhythmic sense of the band, which was very tribal in the early 80s, changing to a more rock, swing beat."

Engineer Tony Platt has stated that Rubin would compare the instrumentation on the album to "the guitar sounds from Back in Black, the drum sound from Highway to Hell, and the voice sound from Led Zeppelin," playing snippets of each record during mixdown. Rubin's production emphasized the bass drum, owing to his background as a hip hop producer.

Although all twelve of the Manor Sessions tracks were initially scrapped, four of them would turn up as B-sides to singles from Electric. A further five of them appeared on a limited edition EP, and with the release of Rare Cult in 2000, the rest of the unreleased Steve Brown-produced tracks were made available, albeit in a limited edition format. They were finally made available on a mainstream release in 2013 as part of the Electric Peace release.

== Critical reception ==
Professional ratings
Review scores
Source	Rating
AllMusic	4.5/5 stars
Kerrang!	3/5 stars
The Rolling Stone Album Guide	3.5/5 stars
The Village Voice	B+

Rolling Stone wrote that "despite the hovering shades of Zeppelin, Bon Scott and others, Electric does more than pilfer bygone metal mayhem. It swaggers, crunches and howls, all right, but it does so with irreverence (not surprising with raunch expert Rick Rubin behind the board)." Trouser Press wrote: "As sensually gratifying as it is cornball retro-moronic, Electric can lay claim to one of history's worst versions of 'Born to Be Wild.'"

== Track listing ==
All tracks are written by Ian Astbury and Billy Duffy, except where noted.

No.	Title	Writer(s)	Length
1.	"Wild Flower"		3:37
2.	"Peace Dog"		3:34
3.	"Lil' Devil"		2:44
4.	"Aphrodisiac Jacket"		4:11
5.	"Electric Ocean"		2:49
6.	"Bad Fun"		3:33
7.	"King Contrary Man"		3:12
8.	"Love Removal Machine"		4:17
9.	"Born to Be Wild"	Mars Bonfire	3:55
10.	"Outlaw"		2:52
11.	"Memphis Hip Shake"		4:01
Total length:			38:51

=== The Manor Sessions EP / Peace track listing ===
Electric arose from the sessions for the unreleased Peace album and featured several rerecorded songs from the Peace sessions. Tracks 2, 5, 6 and 10 below first appeared on The Manor Sessions EP in 1988. Tracks 7, 8, 9 and 11 were issued as B-sides to singles from Electric in 1987. The full Peace album was not released in its entirety until 2000, when it was included as Disc 3 of the Rare Cult boxed set. In 2013, the Peace album was released as part of a two-disc set alongside Electric, under the title Electric Peace.

No.	Title	Length
1.	"Love Removal Machine"	5:16
2.	"Wild Flower"	4:10
3.	"Peace Dog"	5:09
4.	"Aphrodisiac Jacket"	4:25
5.	"Electric Ocean"	4:13
6.	"Bad Fun"	6:24
7.	"Conquistador"	2:53
8.	"Zap City"	5:15
9.	"Love Trooper"	3:55
10.	"Outlaw"	5:07
11.	"Groove Co."	4:13

== Personnel ==
The Cult

- Ian Astbury – lead vocals
- Billy Duffy – guitars
- Jamie Stewart – bass
- Les Warner – drums

== Charts ==
Chart (1987)	Peak position
Australian Albums (Kent Music Report)	34
Canada Top Albums/CDs (RPM)	3
Dutch Albums (Album Top 100)	15
Finnish Albums (The Official Finnish Charts)	12
New Zealand Albums (RMNZ)	16
Swedish Albums (Sverigetopplistan)	24
Swiss Albums (Schweizer Hitparade)	22
UK Albums (Official Charts)	4
US Billboard 200	38

Chart (2023)	Peak position
Scottish Albums (Official Charts)	58
UK Independent Albums (Official Charts)	19
UK Rock & Metal Albums (Official Charts)	7

== Certifications ==
Region	Certification	Certified units/sales
Canada (Music Canada)	2× Platinum	200,000^{^}
United Kingdom (BPI)	Gold	100,000^{^}
United States (RIAA)	Platinum	1,000,000^{^}
^{^} Shipments figures based on certification alone.
