= Ian Astbury =

British singer (born 1962)

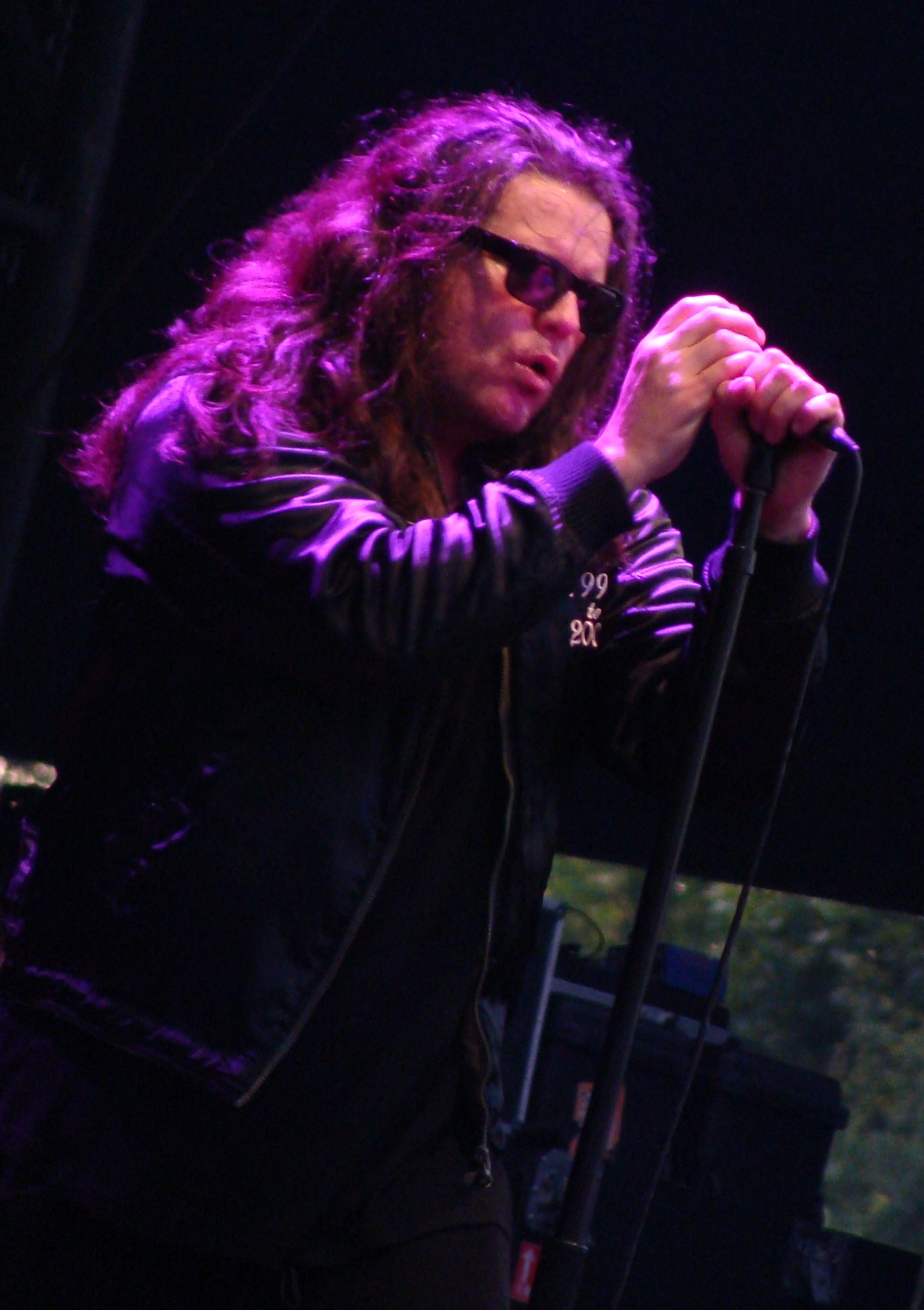
- Astbury performing with The Cult in 2011

Background information
- Born: Ian Robert Astbury; 14 May 1962 (age 64); Heswall, Cheshire, (Note: Heswall was part of Cheshire in 1962. It later became part of Merseyside upon the county’s establishment in 1974.) England
- Genres: Hard rock; gothic rock; post-punk
- Occupations: Singer; songwriter
- Instruments: Vocals; percussion; guitar
- Years active: 1981–present
- Member of: The Cult
- Formerly of: Southern Death Cult; Death Cult; The Doors of the 21st Century; Holy Barbarians

Ian Robert Astbury (born 14 May 1962) is a British singer, best known as the lead vocalist, frontman and a founding member of the rock band The Cult. During various hiatuses from the Cult, Astbury fronted the short-lived band Holy Barbarians in 1996, and later from 2002 to 2007 served as the lead singer of Doors of the 21st century, a Doors tribute band that also featured original Doors members Ray Manzarek and Robby Krieger. Astbury replaced Rob Tyner during an MC5 reunion in 2003, and has contributed guest vocals on several recordings by other artists.

== Early life ==
Ian Astbury was born in Heswall, Cheshire, near Liverpool, and is of Scottish and English descent. He moved with his family to Hamilton, Ontario, Canada, from England in 1973 when he was 11. He attended Glendale Secondary School. He has said that, whilst in Canada, "the other kids in my group were indigenous, native to the local reservation, Six Nations. I went there and was around indigenous kids. ... I became fascinated by their culture. And then that evolved over the years." "I've had an affinity for indigenous culture since I came to Canada because they embraced me. When I came here, I felt ostracized and the main white Anglo-European culture and the indigenous kids were cool and just took me for who I was. Then, learning about their culture, it was always a love affair with the indigenous culture and the indigenous people. So that's an area I find myself drawn to."

Astbury's early musical influences took root in Hamilton, where he became a fan of David Bowie, Iggy Pop and New York Dolls. He did not start performing until after his return to the UK.

In 1979, while living in Glasgow, Astbury was influenced by the Doors' song "The End", which he heard while watching the film Apocalypse Now, later describing this as "a religious experience".

== Career ==
=== Early career ===
In 1980, Astbury was in Liverpool, where he was active on the punk scene based around Eric's Club. He moved to Bradford in late 1980, and by 1981 he helped found the post-punk band Southern Death Cult, which lasted until March 1983. Along with guitarist Billy Duffy, bassist Jamie Stewart and drummer Raymond Taylor Smith, Astbury formed a new band, Death Cult, and released the Death Cult extended play (EP). To help broaden their appeal, the band changed its name to "the Cult" in January 1984 before appearing on the Channel 4 television show, The Tube.

The Cult's debut studio album, Dreamtime, was released in 1984, followed by Love in 1985. Love featured the single "She Sells Sanctuary", which introduced the band to an international audience. Many songs of these early albums focus on Native American themes, a particular interest of Astbury's. On their third studio album, Electric (1987), the Cult made a transformation to a hard rock sound with the help of producer Rick Rubin.

After the release of the 1989 studio album Sonic Temple and the single "Fire Woman", Astbury relocated to Los Angeles, California, US.

=== 1990s ===
In 1994, the Cult returned with an eponymous studio album and a musical change of pace. Their hard rock sound was gone, as a result of Astbury's growing interest in alternative music, fashion and introspective lyrics. Although the album produced two singles ("Coming Down" and "Star"), it was not a commercial success. They toured to support the album, but in Brazil creative differences with guitarist Duffy reached their nadir, which resulted in him leaving the band.

Astbury soon assembled another group of musicians and began writing new songs. He called the band Holy Barbarians, and in 1996 the band released the studio album Cream, which was not a commercial success. The band appeared at the small Tunbridge Wells Forum, where Vic Reeves joined the band onstage for a rendition of "Wildflower".

Personal difficulties and a drive for further introspection drove Astbury away from his new group, and he began working on a solo studio album, eventually released as Spirit/Light/Speed in 2000.

In 1999, Astbury and Duffy reformed the Cult. The band signed a new recording contract with Atlantic Records, and in 2001 Beyond Good and Evil was released. The band initially enjoyed radio success with the single "Rise", until a falling out with Atlantic, which ended all commercial promotions and radio play for the album. Disillusioned by the fight with the record label, Astbury brought the Cult to another hiatus in 2002.

=== 2000–present ===
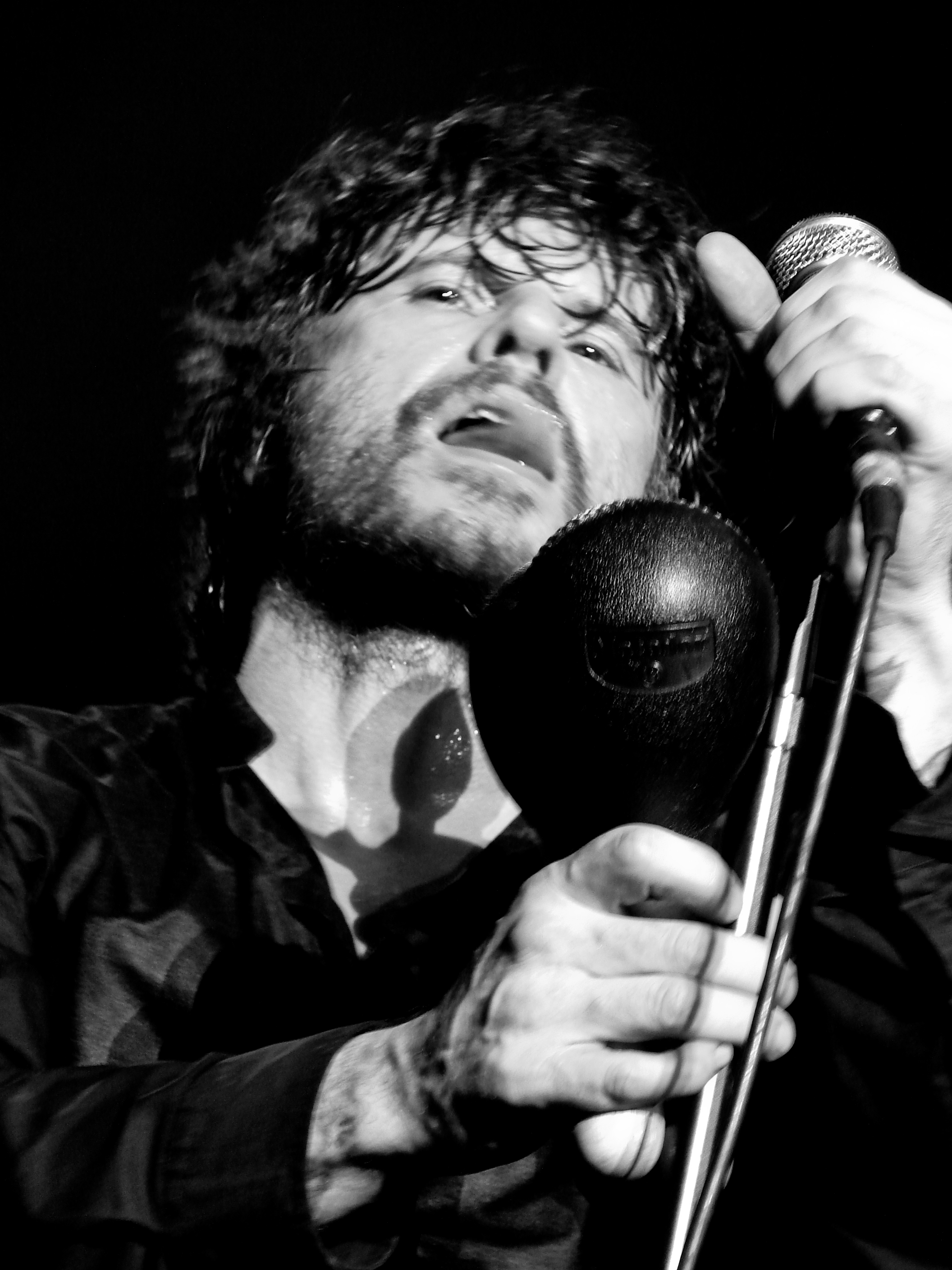
Astbury performing in 2007

Astbury became lead vocalist of the Doors of the 21st Century in 2002. The group featured original Doors members Robby Krieger and Ray Manzarek.

In 2003, Astbury performed with the surviving members of MC5 at the 100 Club in London.

He re-formed the Cult with Duffy in 2006, for a series of live shows. In October 2007, the Cult released Born into This, which included the single "Dirty Little Rockstar". In 2009, the band embarked on a tour with shows across Canada, the US, and various countries in Europe where they performed their 1985 studio album Love in its entirety.

On 29 May 2010, the Japanese band Boris performed "The End" with Ian Astbury at Vivid Festival in Sydney. Boris and Astbury released a four-song EP in September 2010 on Southern Lord and Daymare Records, containing four tracks entitled "Teeth and Claws," "We are Witches," "Rain" and "Magickal Child."

=== Other musical ventures ===
Astbury is featured on the UNKLE tracks "Burn My Shadow", "When Things Explode" and "Forever." He also sings "Flame On" on Black Sabbath lead guitarist Tony Iommi's debut solo studio album Iommi (2000), and recorded a duet with Debbie Harry on her 1989 solo studio album Def, Dumb and Blonde, called "Lovelight".

In 2010, he provided the vocals for the song "Ghost" on guitarist Slash's self-titled solo studio album. The track also featured former Guns N' Roses guitarist Izzy Stradlin on rhythm guitar. Astbury is also credited for playing the drums on a track called "Gasp" by Japanese Cartoon.

== Personal life ==
Astbury lives in Los Angeles. He has played on the amateur soccer team Hollywood United with Billy Duffy and Steve Jones of Sex Pistols. He is a supporter of English Premier League club Everton. On 26 May 2012, Astbury married the Black Ryder singer and guitarist Aimee Nash in Las Vegas.

== Discography ==
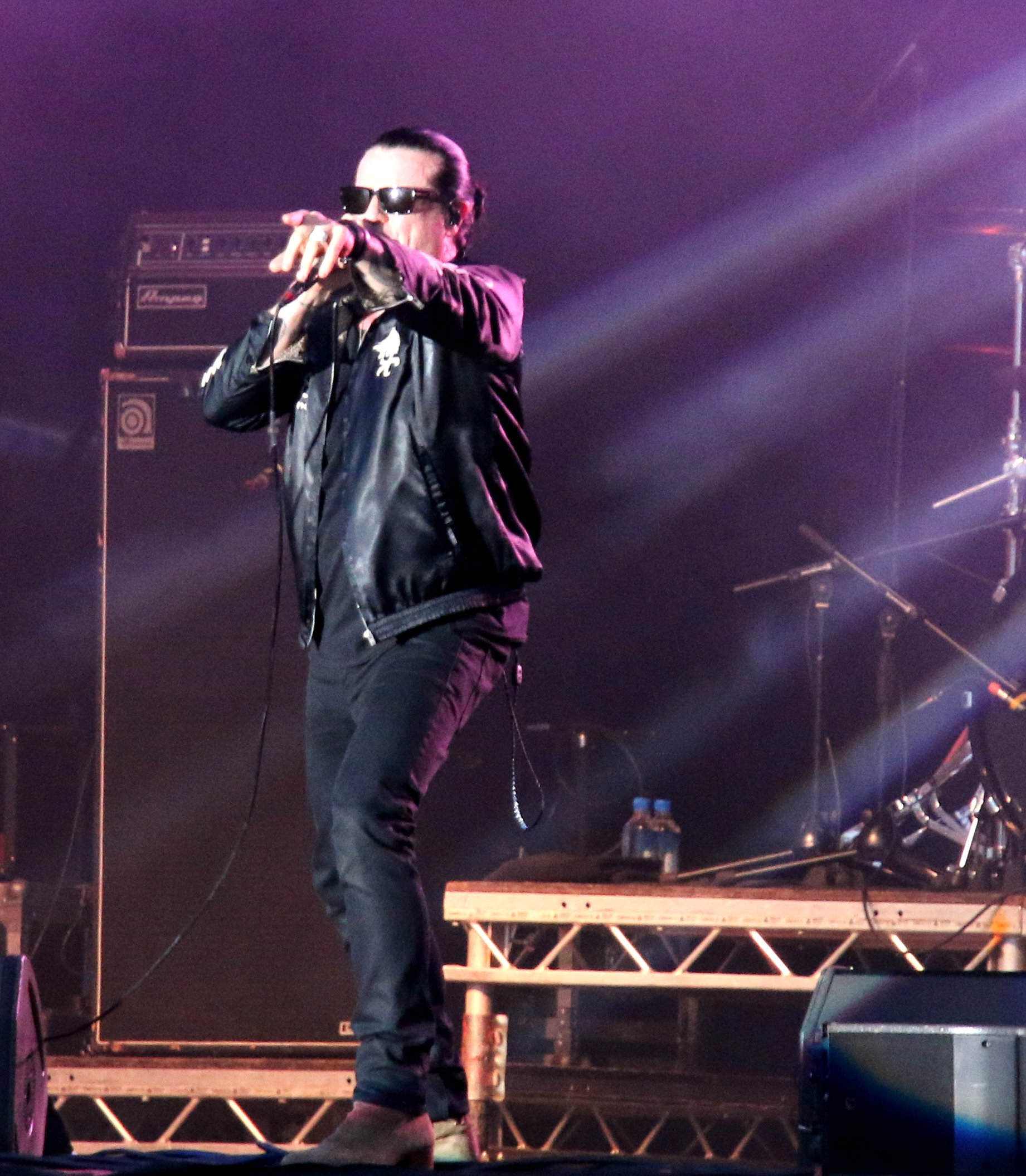
Astbury performing in 2018

=== The Cult ===
- Dreamtime (1984)
- Love (1985)
- Electric (1987)
- Sonic Temple (1989)
- Ceremony (1991)
- The Cult (1994)
- Beyond Good and Evil (2001)
- Born into This (2007)
- Choice of Weapon (2012)
- Hidden City (2016)
- Under the Midnight Sun (2022)

=== Holy Barbarians ===
- Cream (1996)

=== Solo ===
- Spirit\Light\Speed (2000)

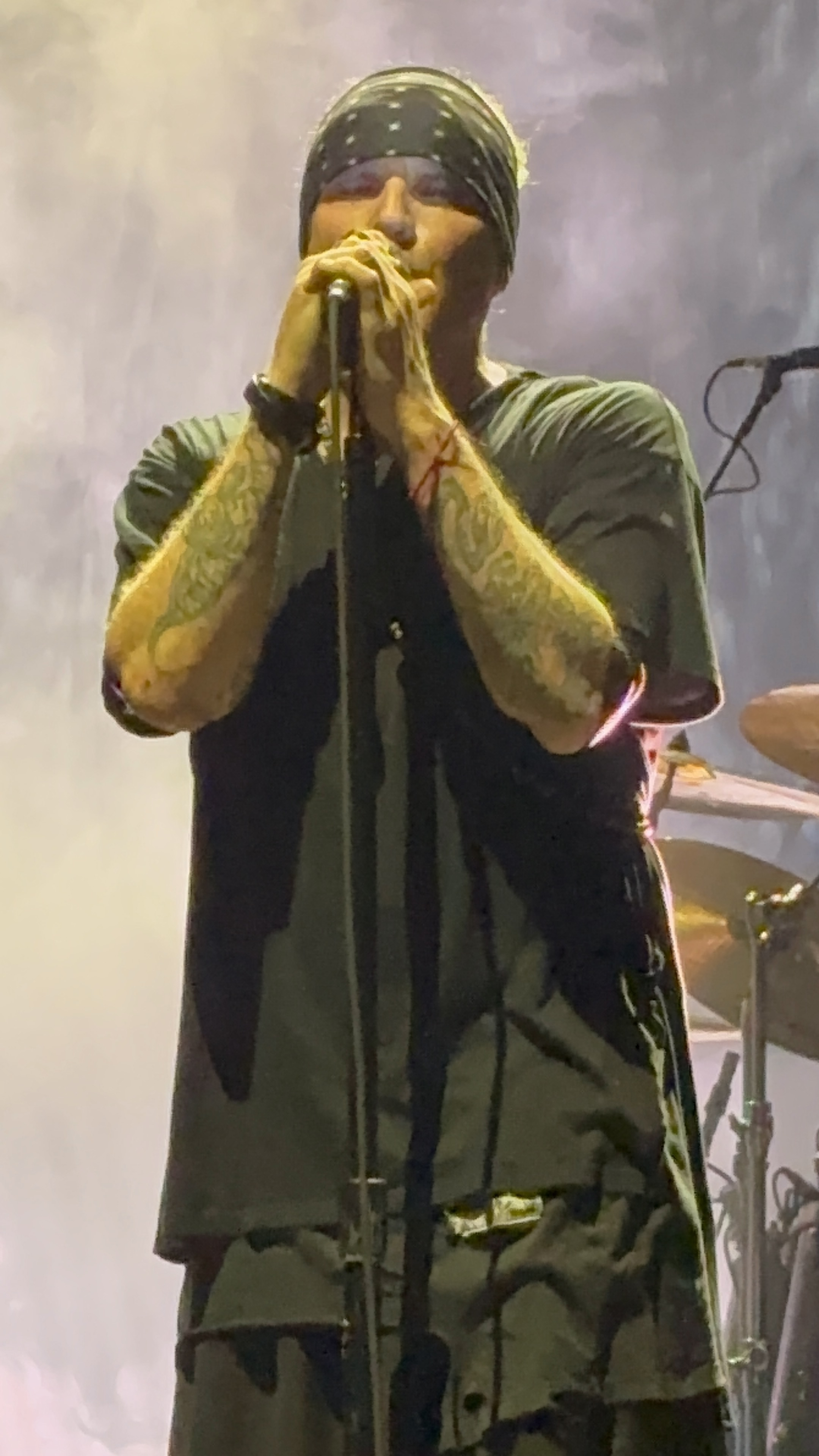
Ian Astbury performs at the Beacon Theatre in New York City with The Cult on October 14, 2025.

=== Guest appearances ===
- Care band by Ian Broudie, Paul Simpson (1983) Very short-lived band whose album "Love Crowns And Crucifies" (a collaboration between the duo with Ian Astbury, Paul Sangster, Tony Wikelan and Alan Wills never saw the light of day due to Simpson and Broudie's opposing musical views and imminent split a year later.
- Deborah Harry, Def, Dumb & Blonde (1989) – backing vocals on "Lovelight"
- The Fuzztones – (1989) "Down On The Street" guest vocals
- Steve Jones, Fire and Gasoline (1989) – Co-producer, words, percussion, backing and lead vocals
- The Four Horsemen, Rockin Is Ma Business (1991) – percussion, backing vocals
- Messiah, 21st Century Jesus (1993) – vocals on "Creator" and samplers on more 4 songs
- Circus of Power, Magic and Madness (1993) – vocals on "Shine"
- The Future Sound of London , (1995) vocals on (unreleased track) "The Shinning Path"
- The Wondergirls, (1999) backing vocals on "Let's Go All The Way"
- Tony Iommi, (2000) Iommi – vocals on "Flame On"
- Various artists. Stoned Immaculate: The Music of The Doors (2000) – vocals on "Touch Me" and ´´Wild Child´´
- Various artists, Sonic Revolution: A Celebration of The MC5 (2001) – vocals on "Kick Out the Jams"
- Unkle, War Stories (2006) – vocals on "Burn My Shadow" and "When Things Explode"
- Slash, Slash (2010) – vocals on "Ghost"
- The Fuzztones – (2010) "Cheyenne Rider" *recorded in 1989 and another 5 songs live
- Japanese Cartoon – (2010) In the Jaws of the Lords of Death drums on "Gasp"
- Boris and Ian Astbury, BXI EP (2010)
- Boris, Heavy Rocks (2011) – backing vocals on "Riot Sugar"
- Unkle, Only the Lonely EP (2011) – vocals on bonus track "Forever"
- The Fuzztones (2013) Snake Oil vocals on "Kick Out The Jams (Live)"
- George Harrison (2016) George Fest: A Night To Celebrate The Music Of George Harrison vocals on "Be Here Now"
- David Bowie (2017) Cast – Celebrating David Bowie – Celebrating David Bowie vocals on "Rock 'n Roll Suicide"
