= Beyond Good and Evil (album) =

Studio album by The Cult
- Released: 5 June 2001
- Recorded: 2000
- Genres: Hard rock; nu metal
- Length: 51:03
- Labels: Atlantic, Lava
- Producer: Bob Rock

The Cult chronology
The Best of Rare Cult (2000)	Beyond Good and Evil (2001)	Born into This (2007)

Singles from Album
- 1. "Rise" Released: 2001; 2. "Breathe *promotional only" Released: 2001; 3. "True Believers *promotional only" Released: 2002

Beyond Good and Evil is the seventh studio album by English rock band The Cult. Released in 2001, it marked their first new recording in six and a half years. It also marked the return of Matt Sorum. He previously toured with the band on the Sonic Temple tour in 1989 and 1990, but this was the first time that he had recorded a studio album with the band.

Beyond Good and Evil debuted at No. 37 on the charts in the United States, No. 22 in Canada and No. 25 in Spain. Only one single, "Rise", was released and had a music video, though "Breathe" and "True Believers" were released as promotional singles. The album was rereleased as a coloured double vinyl on 31 January 2025

== Background and writing ==
The title of the record is a reference to Friedrich Nietzsche's 1886 book of the same title, and it briefly had the mock working title of Bring Me the Head of Dave Grohl, referencing the frontman of Foo Fighters, and also the former drummer of Nirvana. Ian Astbury's original choice for the record's title was The Demon Process.

"My Bridges Burn" was originally titled "Save Me"; "Breathe" originally had the slightly longer title "Breathe (You Bastard)" along with an overdub of keyboards after the guitar solo which was later removed; and "Speed of Light" went through several different titles: originally titled "Black California", then "Who Plays the Devil" before the band decided on its final title.

== Reception ==
Professional ratings
Aggregate scores
Source	Rating
Metacritic	60/100
Review scores
Source	Rating
AllMusic	3/5 stars
Rolling Stone	3/5 stars

Q Magazine described Beyond Good & Evil as combining "Metallica, nu-metal and the slightly psychedelic ambience of '85's Love" while AllMusic praised the album as "heavy metal for the new millennium."

== Track listing ==
All tracks are written by Ian Astbury and Billy Duffy, except where noted.

No.	Title	Writer(s)	Length
1.	"War (The Process)"		4:12
2.	"The Saint"		3:36
3.	"Rise"		3:39
4.	"Take the Power"		3:55
5.	"Breathe"	Astbury, Duffy, Mick Jones, Marti Frederiksen	4:59
6.	"Nico"		4:49
7.	"American Gothic"		3:56
8.	"Ashes and Ghosts"	Astbury, Duffy, Bob Rock	5:00
9.	"Shape the Sky"		3:29
10.	"Speed of Light"	Astbury, Duffy, Rock	4:22
11.	"True Believers"		5:07
12.	"My Bridges Burn"		3:51
Total length:			51:03

Australia and Japan bonus track
No.	Title	Length
13.	"Libertine"	4:30

== Personnel ==
The Cult

- Ian Astbury – vocals
- Billy Duffy – guitar
- Matt Sorum – drums, percussion

Additional musicians

- Martyn LeNoble – bass on tracks 5, 10, 11, 12
- Chris Wyse – bass on tracks 1, 2, 3, 4, 6, 7, 8, 9, 13

== Charts ==
Chart (2001)	Peak position
Australian Albums (ARIA Charts)	61
Austrian Albums (Ö3 Austria)	73
Finnish Albums (Suomen virallinen lista)	21
French Albums (SNEP)	140
German Albums (Offizielle Top 100)	21
Hungarian Albums (MAHASZ)	37
New Zealand Albums (RMNZ)	33
Scottish Albums (Official Charts)	76
Swiss Albums (Schweizer Hitparade)	93
UK Albums (Official Charts)	69
UK Rock & Metal Albums (Official Charts)	7
US Billboard 200	37

Chart (2025)	Peak position
Hungarian Physical Albums (MAHASZ)	16
