= Billy Duffy =

British guitarist

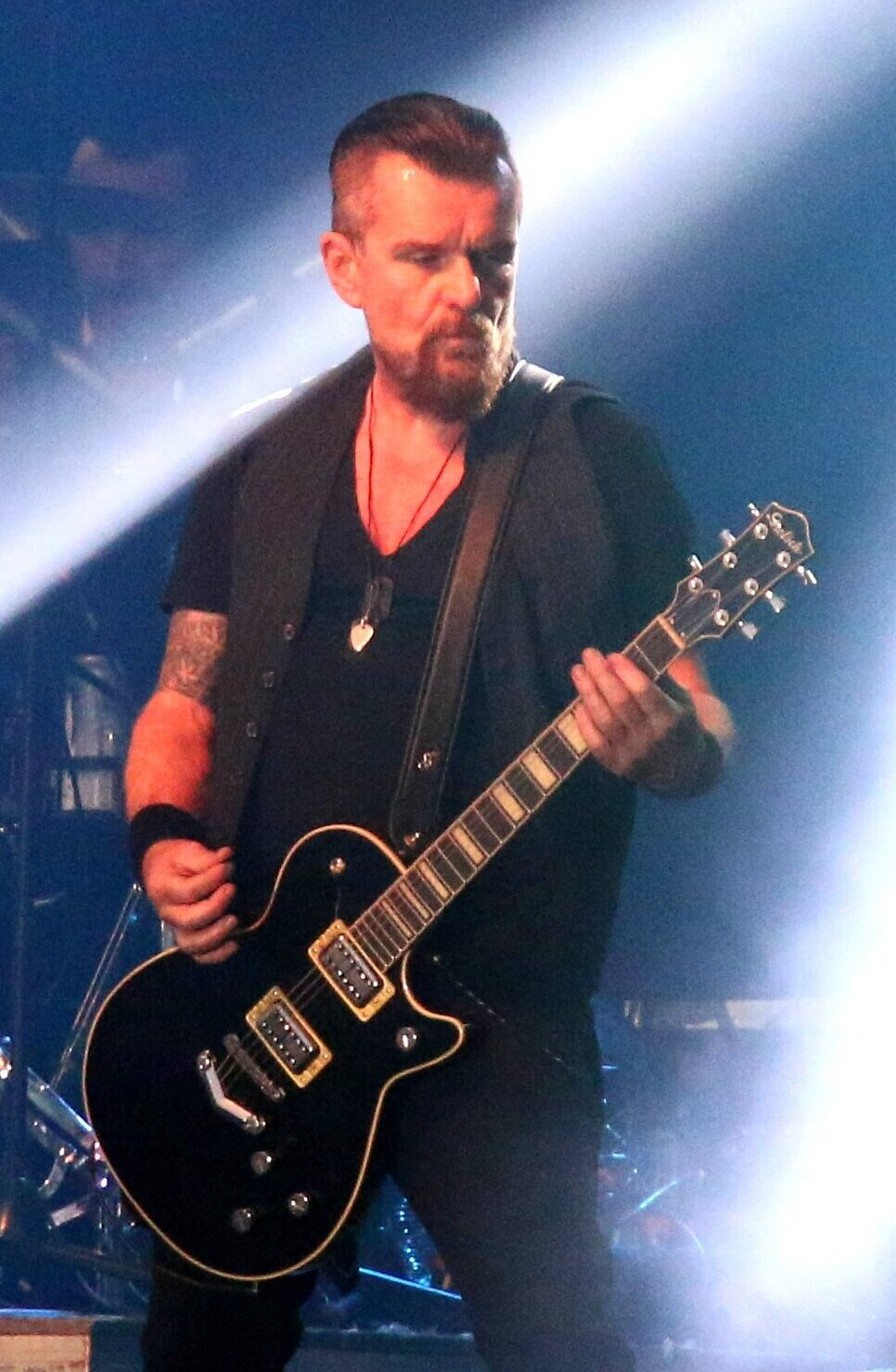
- Duffy performing in 2018

Background information
- Born: William Henry Duffy; 12 May 1961 (age 65); Hulme, Manchester, England
- Genres: Hard rock; rock; alternative rock; post-punk; gothic rock; heavy metal
- Occupation: Guitarist
- Years active: 1979–present
- Labels: Virgin; Situation Two; Beggars Banquet; Atlantic
- Member of: The Cult
- Website: billyduffy.com

William Henry Duffy (born 12 May 1961) is an English rock musician, best known as the guitarist in the band The Cult.

== Early life ==
Duffy was born and grew up in Manchester, England. He has Irish and Jewish heritage and ancestry. He began playing the guitar at the age of fourteen, being influenced by the music of Queen, Thin Lizzy, the Who, Aerosmith, Blue Öyster Cult, and the early work of Led Zeppelin. In the late 1970s he became involved in the punk movement, influenced by the New York Dolls, the Stooges, Buzzcocks, the Sex Pistols, and AC/DC. He started playing lead guitar with a number of different punk rock acts whilst still in school in the late 1970s, including the Studio Sweethearts, a band composed of ex members of Slaughter & The Dogs and early UK punk rock group Eater (band),working with sound engineer Vic Maile and promoted by ex- David Bowie manager, Kenneth Pitt.

== Career ==
=== Playing for Theatre of Hate and Subsequent Formation of The Cult ===
After leaving school, Duffy left Manchester when the Studio Sweethearts moved to London, working as an assistant at the exclusive Johnsons clothing, at 406 King's Road, in the Chelsea neighbourhood World's End. Johnson's clothes were popular with music fans and fashion followers, particularly after being championed in British style magazines such as The Face. Duffy was also playing live around London with punk rock band, Lonesome no More (though he does not appear on their "Turned Insane" 45, released in 1981 on Rage Records). The Studio Sweethearts subsequently broke up and Duffy began playing lead guitar with the band Theatre of Hate.

In August 1981, Mick Jones of The Clash produced Westworld, Theatre of Hate's only studio album to be released on Burning Rome Records prior to the band's dissolution the following year. Billy Duffy joined the band soon after the album had been recorded, but he appears on the Top 40 showing of the single "Do You Believe in the West World" on Top of the Pops. Duffy also plays on “The Hop” single, released in 1982, and on the second version of their iconic He Who Dares Wins Live LP aka You Have A Choice, which was recorded in Berlin, also in 1982, and released on Burning Rome record label.

Duffy also played at the Futurama Festival with Theatre of Hate in 1981, appearing on the same bill with Bauhaus, UK Decay and The Sisters of Mercy. Author I.M. Trowell writes of the performance in "Floors, Harsh Sounds and the Northern Anti-Festival: Futurama 1979-1983" that Theatre of Hate “were developing a hard punk-rockabilly blend” at this stage of their stylistic trajectory.

Shortly after he met Ian Astbury, then frontman/lead vocalist with Southern Death Cult, who was sufficiently impressed with Duffy's talents that he quit Southern Death Cult to start a new band with him called Death Cult. After releasing two singles, the band shortened its name to The Cult. In The Cult's debut single "Spiritwalker (song)", Duffy created a distinctive flanged sound using a mid-1970s Gretsch White Falcon, which he chose partly due to the influence of Adam and the Ants-Bow Wow Wow guitarist, Matthew Ashman. The guitar was Duffy's trademark instrument from his earliest days with Theatre of Hate. The Cult's debut album, Dreamtime, was released in 1984, followed in 1985 by Love, which featured the hit "She Sells Sanctuary".

=== Late 1980s and 1990s ===
For The Cult's third album, 1987's Electric, Duffy helped change the sound into metal-blues. In 1988, Duffy moved to Los Angeles with Astbury, where they both still reside. There, the two writing partners (with longtime bassist Jamie Stewart) turned to stadium rock and recorded Sonic Temple. The Cult reached a larger, mainstream audience, but the public's attention could not be sustained with their next album, Ceremony, at the dawn of the grunge age.

Following the 'Ceremonial Stomp' tour of 1992, Astbury pressured Duffy to return to their roots, with The Cult's self-titled album. This would ultimately lead to Astbury's departure from Duffy and The Cult in 1995.

During The Cult's four-year hiatus, Duffy played with Mike Peters of The Alarm in a project called Coloursound. Duffy also played on the title track from Japanese musician J's 1997 debut album, Pyromania.

=== The Cult reformation and hiatus ===
Duffy reformed The Cult with Astbury in 1999, which led to a new recording contract with Atlantic Records. This was capped off by a show at Atlanta's Music Midtown Festival in May 2001, where over 60,000 people watched them perform, leading up to the release of Beyond Good and Evil.

Their single to promote it, "Rise", which reached No. 125 in the US and No. 3 for 6 weeks on the mainstream rock chart, was removed from radio rotation a week after the album's release. Disappointing sales, reviews, and tour attendance ensued. In 2002, Astbury sent The Cult onto a hiatus once more, when he accepted an offer to sing with The Doors.

=== 2004 and onward ===
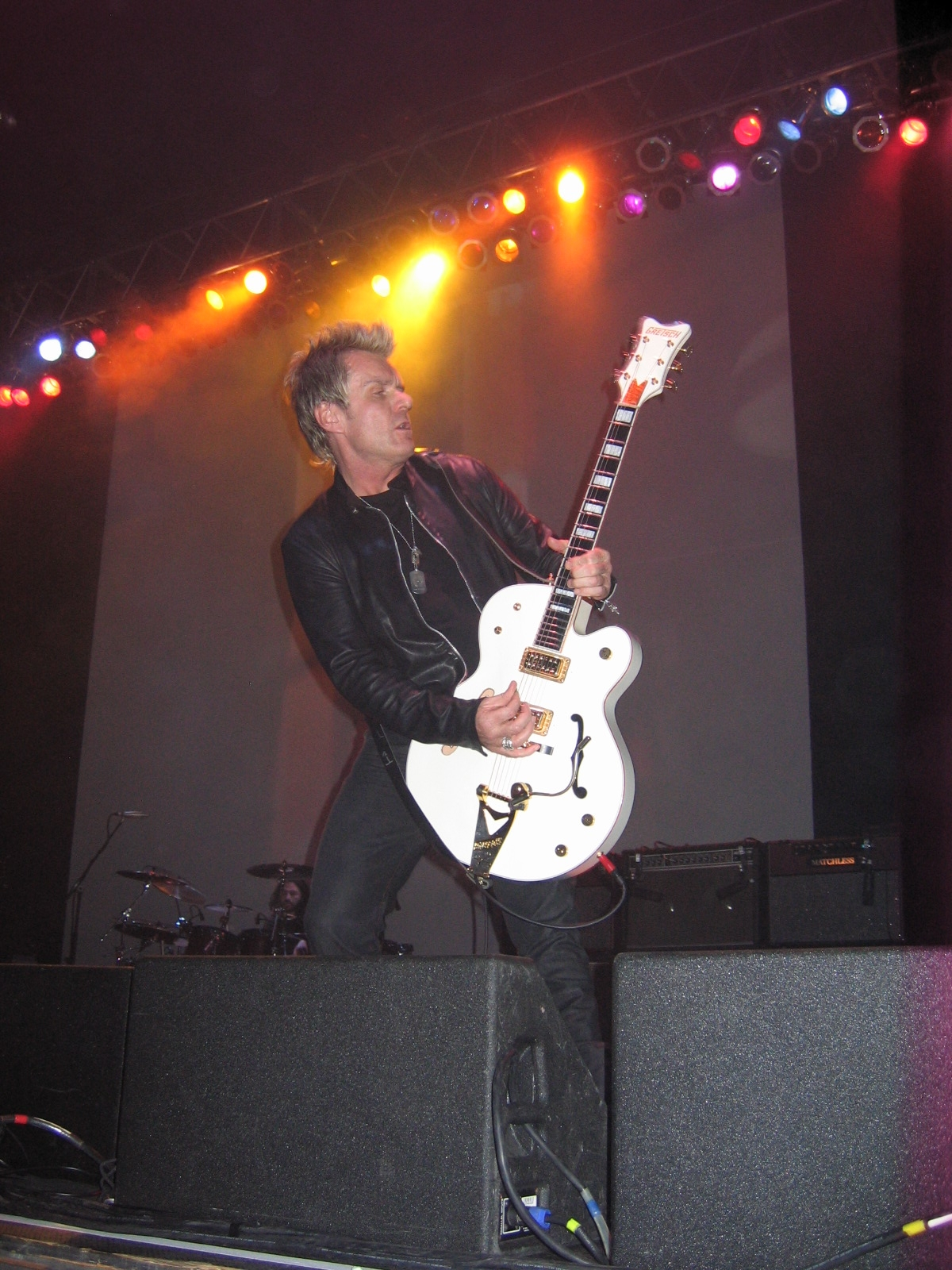
Duffy playing his White Gretsch with The Cult in New York in 2009

In early 2004, Duffy formed the covers band Cardboard Vampyres alongside Alice in Chains guitarist/vocalist Jerry Cantrell. Also in the band were Mötley Crüe and Ratt vocalist John Corabi, The Cult bassist Chris Wyse and drummer Josh Howser. The band played at various venues in the United States between 2004 and 2005. They predominantly played along the West Coast. No albums were released by the band.

The Cult reformed in early 2006 and after playing several US concerts toured Europe. Duffy appeared in Ethan Dettenmaier's film, Sin-Jin Smyth, which was filmed in 2006, but remains unreleased.

In early 2006 Duffy recorded a debut album with his new band, Circus Diablo: Duffy played lead guitar, with former Cult touring bass player Billy Morrison on lead vocals and bass guitar, Ricky Warwick playing rhythm guitar, and Matt Sorum playing drums.

After the completion of the album, former Fuel member Brett Scallions was added as bassist so Morrison could focus on being the lead singer. Then Jeremy Colson, formerly with Steve Vai, was brought in to be the full-time drummer for the band. Duffy's involvement ended in 2007.

In 2007, he was a judge on Bodog Music's Battle of the Bands.

In 2010, Duffy appeared on the TV series, Married to Rock, which starred his then-girlfriend AJ Celi. In October 2012, he performed with Sammy Hagar and Michael Anthony at the Cabo Wabo Cantina for Sammy Hagar's Birthday Bash in Cabo San Lucas, Mexico.

In an October 2016 interview with PopMatters journalist J.C. Maçek III, Duffy spoke about his favorite Cult song, saying "Jonesy [former Sex Pistols guitarist turned radio host Steve Jones] on Jonesy's Jukebox just played 'Love' from the Love album and that's my favorite Cult song," he tells me proudly. "I actually got, I have to admit, a teeny bit of a goose bump because it just captured exactly what I wanted to say with that kind of haunting rock. Kind of swaggery but not heavy, it's got ... Duffy searches for the right words to express his emotion at hearing the song from the outside, "I mean nobody ... I don't know who makes music like that!" Between 2012 and 2016, Duffy appeared with the Kings of Chaos.

== Personal life ==
In 2020, Duffy became engaged to former glamour model Leilani Dowding. Duffy is an avid Manchester City F.C. fan.

== Guitars and equipment ==
Duffy is known for playing Gretsch White Falcon and Gibson Les Paul Custom guitars throughout his career. In January 2013, Gretsch introduced the Billy Duffy White Falcon G7593T guitar.

== Portrayals in media ==
In the 2017 feature film England Is Mine, a biopic about the early years of Morrissey, Duffy is portrayed by Adam Lawrence.

== Discography ==
The Cult

- Dreamtime (1984)
- Love (1985)
- Electric (1987)
- Sonic Temple (1989)
- Ceremony (1991)
- The Cult (1994)
- Beyond Good and Evil (2001)
- Born into This (2007)
- Choice of Weapon (2012)
- Hidden City (2016)
- Under the Midnight Sun (2022)
