= The Cult discography =

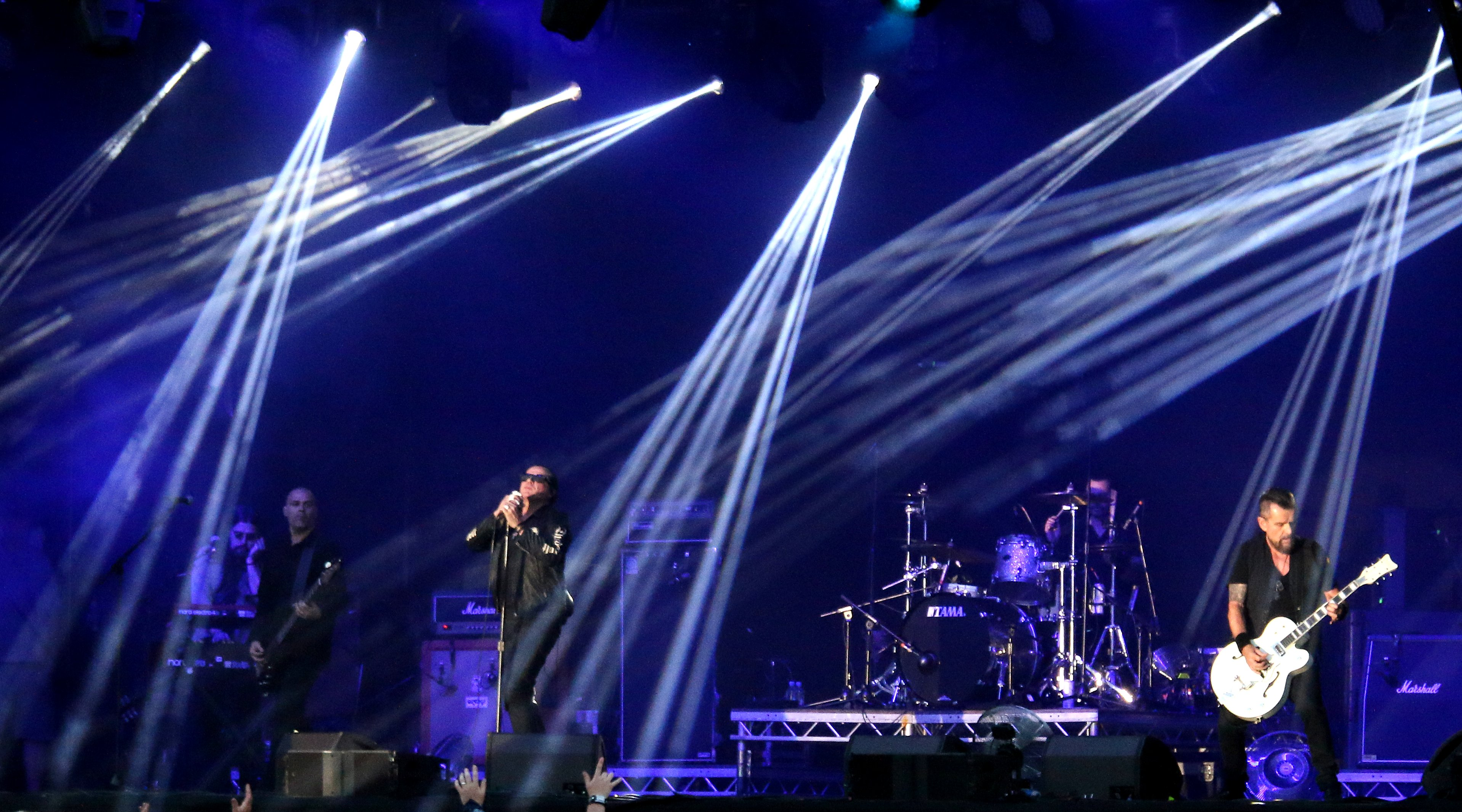
- The Cult in concert in 2018
- Studio albums: 11
- Extended plays: 22
- Live albums: 2
- Compilation albums: 6
- Singles: 38
- Video albums: 7
- Box sets: 5

The discography of British rock band The Cult includes 11 studio albums, two live albums, six compilation albums, seven video albums, five box sets, 20 EPs and 38 singles. The band was formed in 1983 and released their debut album the following year, with their latest studio album being released in 2022.

== Albums ==
=== Studio albums ===
Title	Album details	Peak chart positions										Certifications
Title	Album details	UK	AUS	CAN	GER	NL	NZ	SPA	SWE	SWI	US	Certifications
Dreamtime	Released: 31 August 1984; Label: Beggars Banquet; Formats: CD, LP, 2xLP, MC	21	—	—	—	—	—	—	46	—	—	BPI: Silver
Love	Released: 18 October 1985; Label: Beggars Banquet; Formats: CD, LP, MC	4	—	5	—	20	37	—	—	—	87	BPI: Gold; MC: 2× Platinum; RIAA: Gold
Electric	Released: 6 April 1987; Label: Beggars Banquet; Formats: CD, LP, MC	4	34	3	—	15	16	—	24	22	38	BPI: Gold; MC: 2× Platinum; RIAA: Platinum
Sonic Temple	Released: 10 April 1989; Label: Beggars Banquet; Formats: CD, LP, MC	3	13	2	39	23	6	—	13	19	10	ARIA: Gold; BPI: Platinum; MC: 2× Platinum; RIAA: Platinum
Ceremony	Released: 23 September 1991; Label: Beggars Banquet; Formats: CD, LP, MC	9	7	14	38	48	3	28	21	38	25	BPI: Gold; MC: Platinum
The Cult	Released: 10 October 1994; Label: Beggars Banquet; Formats: CD, 2xLP, MC	21	7	12	45	61	8	34	21	30	69	MC: Gold
Beyond Good and Evil	Released: 5 June 2001; Label: Atlantic, Lava; Formats: CD, MC	69	61	—	21	–	33	28	—	93	37	
Born into This	Released: 1 October 2007; Label: Roadrunner; Formats: CD, 2xCD	72	121	29	81	71	—	86	56	79	70	
Choice of Weapon	Released: 18 May 2012; Label: Cooking Vinyl; Formats: CD, 2xCD LP, digital download	20	73	15	30	32	—	33	50	42	36	
Hidden City	Released: 5 February 2016; Label: Cooking Vinyl; Formats: CD, 2xLP, digital download	19	42	80	51	36	—	41	—	50	153	
Under the Midnight Sun	Released: 7 October 2022; Label: Black Hill Records; Formats: CD, 2xLP, digital download	15	—	—	89	—	—	—	—	53	—	
"—" denotes releases that did not chart or were not released in that territory.

=== Live albums ===
Title	Album details
Dreamtime Live at the Lyceum (Note: Dreamtime Live at the Lyceum was initially released with the first 30,000 copies of Dreamtime in the UK on 31 August 1984. The live album was later released as a separate album in Japan in September 1985 and in Canada in 1986.)	Released: 31 August 1984; Label: Beggars Banquet; Formats: LP, MC
Live Cult Marquee London MCMXCI	Released: February 1993; Label: Beggars Banquet; Formats: 2xCD, 2xLP
Paradise Live (as Death Cult)	Released: January 2026; Label: Beggars Banquet; Formats: CD, 2xLP

=== Compilation albums ===
Title	Album details	Peak chart positions								Certifications
Title	Album details	UK	AUS	CAN	FIN	GER	NL	NZ	SWE	Certifications
Pure Cult: For Rockers, Ravers, Lovers, and Sinners	Released: 1 February 1993; Label: Beggars Banquet; Formats: CD, 2xCD, 2xLP, 4xLP, MC	1	7	5	19	32	31	1	28	ARIA: Gold; BPI: Gold; MC: 2× Platinum; RMNZ: Platinum
High Octane Cult: Ultimate Collection 1984–1995	Released: 5 November 1996; Label: Beggars Banquet; Formats: CD, MC	—	—	—	—	—	—	—	—	
Pure Cult: The Singles 1984–1995	Released: 5 June 2000; Label: Beggars Banquet; Formats: CD	—	—	—	—	—	—	—	—	MC: Platinum
Best of Rare Cult	Released: 17 October 2000; Label: Beggars Banquet; Formats: CD	—	—	—	—	—	—	—	—	
Weapon of Choice (Note: Weapon of Choice was announced as an exclusive iTunes release that would be available for a limited time until December 2012. However, in some countries, the album is still available to stream and download from iTunes, and it is even available on some other streaming sites, such as Spotify.)	Released: 16 October 2012; Label: Cooking Vinyl; Formats: digital download	—	—	—	—	—	—	—	—	
Electric Peace (Note: This is a re-packaging of the 1987 album Electric and Peace, which had only previously been available on the 2000 box set Rare Cult.)	Released: 16 July 2013; Label: Beggars Banquet; Formats: 2xCD, 2xLP	—	—	—	—	—	—	—	—	
"—" denotes releases that did not chart or were not released in that territory.

=== Box sets ===
Title	Album details
Singles Collection 1984–1990 (Note: Only 10,000 copies were produced. A similar, partially unofficial box set, entitled E.P. Collection '84–'90, consisting of 11 CDs was also released, with only 500 copies produced.)	Released: 5 August 1991; Label: Beggars Banquet; Formats: 7xCD
Rare Cult (Note: Only 15,000 copies were produced, with the first 5,000 copies including a bonus disc of remixes)	Released: 21 November 2000; Label: Beggars Banquet; Formats: 6xCD, 7xCD
Rare Cult: The Demo Sessions (Note: Only 3,000 copies were produced)	Released: 12 August 2002; Label: Beggars Banquet; Formats: 5xCD
Love: Omnibus Edition	Released: 21 September 2009; Label: Beggars Banquet; Formats: 4xCD
Sonic Temple 30	Released: 10 September 2019; Label: Beggars Banquet; Formats: 5xCD, 3xLP+MC, digital download

=== Video albums ===
Title	Album details	Certifications
Dreamtime Live at the Lyceum	Released: September 1984; Label: Beggars Banquet; Formats: VHS, Betamax	
Electric Love: The Videosingles	Released: November 1987; Label: Beggars Banquet; Formats: VHS	MC: Platinum
Sonic Ceremony: The Video Singles	Released: June 1992; Label: Beggars Banquet; Formats: VHS	
Pure Cult: For Rockers, Ravers, Lovers, and Sinners	Released: February 1993; Label: Beggars Banquet; Formats: VHS	
Pure Cult Anthology 1984–1995	Released: October 2001; Label: Beggars Banquet; Formats: DVD	MC: Gold
Music Without Fear: Live from the Grand Olympic Auditorium, Los Angeles	Released: November 2002; Label: Beggars Banquet; Formats: DVD	
Live at the Fillmore New York at Irving Plaza November 13, 2006	Released: October 2007; Label: The Cult Live; Formats: DVD	

== EPs ==
Title	Album details	Peak chart positions
Title	Album details	UK
Death Cult (as Death Cult) (Note: Released on CD in 1988 with two additional tracks, before being released as a 10-track album in 1996 as Ghost Dance.)	Released: 29 July 1983; Label: Situation Two; Formats: 12"	103
Revolution E.P.	Released: 22 November 1985; Label: Beggars Banquet; Formats: 12", MC	—
Love Removal Machine	Released: 1987; Label: Vertigo; Formats: 2x12"; Canada-only release	—
Lil' Devil	Released: 1987; Label: Vertigo; Formats: 2x12"; Canada-only release	—
Wildflower	Released: 1987; Label: Vertigo; Formats: 2x12"; Canada-only release	—
Wildflower – Special Ltd Edition Australian Tour E.P.	Released: 1987; Label: Vertigo; Formats: CD, 12"; Australia-only limited release	—
The Manor Sessions	Released: 12 December 1988; Label: Beggars Banquet; Formats: CD	—
Fire Woman	Released: 1989; Label: Vertigo; Formats: CD, 12", MC; Canada-only release	—
The Love Mixes	Released: 1989; Label: Beggars Banquet; Formats: CD	—
Edie (Ciao Baby)	Released: 1989; Label: Vertigo; Formats: CD, 12", MC; Canada-only release	—
The Electric Mixes	Released: 27 November 1989; Label: Beggars Banquet; Formats: CD	—
Sweet Soul Sister	Released: 1990; Label: Vertigo; Formats: CD, 12", MC; Canada-only release	—
Spiritwalker • Go West	Released: 1991; Label: Beggars Banquet; Formats: CD	—
Ressurection Joe • She Sells Sanctuary	Released: 1991; Label: Beggars Banquet; Formats: CD	—
Rain • Revolution	Released: 1991; Label: Beggars Banquet; Formats: CD	—
Love Removal Machine • Lil' Devil	Released: 1991; Label: Beggars Banquet; Formats: CD	—
Wildflower • Live 1986 / 1987	Released: 1991; Label: Beggars Banquet; Formats: CD	—
Fire Woman • Edie (Ciao Baby) • Sun King	Released: 1991; Label: Beggars Banquet; Formats: CD	—
Sweet Soul Sister • Live 1987 / 1989	Released: 1991; Label: Beggars Banquet; Formats: CD	—
The White EP	Released: 1992; Label: Vertigo; Formats: CD; Canada-only release	—
Capsule I	Released: 14 September 2010; Label: Aderra/New Wilderness; Formats: CD, digital download	—
Capsule II	Released: 16 November 2010; Label: Aderra/New Wilderness; Formats: CD, digital download	—
"—" denotes releases that did not chart or were not released in that territory.

== Singles ==
Title	Year	Peak chart positions										Certifications	Album
Title	Year	UK	AUS	CAN	FIN	IRE	NL	NZ	US	US Alt	US Main	Certifications	Album
"Gods Zoo" (as Death Cult)	1983	124	—	—	—	—	—	—	—	—	—		Non-album single
"Spiritwalker"	1984	77	—	—	—	—	—	—	—	—	—		Dreamtime
"Go West (Crazy Spinning Circles)"	1984	90	—	—	—	—	—	—	—	—	—		Dreamtime
"Ressurection Joe"	1984	74	—	—	—	—	—	—	—	—	—		Non-album single
"She Sells Sanctuary"	1985	15	—	11	—	27	35	—	—	—	—	BPI: Platinum; MC: 2× Platinum	Love
"Rain"	1985	17	—	—	—	17	—	—	—	—	—		Love
"Revolution"	1985	30	—	—	—	—	—	—	—	—	—		Love
"Love Removal Machine"	1987	18	58	36	—	—	24	25	—	—	15	MC: Gold	Electric
"Lil' Devil"	1987	11	—	—	25	13	90	—	—	—	34		Electric
"Wild Flower"	1987	24	69	—	—	16	—	5	—	—	39		Electric
"Fire Woman"	1989	15	24	22	23	7	81	1	46	2	4	MC: Platinum	Sonic Temple
"Edie (Ciao Baby)"	1989	32	77	62	—	21	40	17	93	—	17		Sonic Temple
"Sun King"	1989	39	—	—	—	25	—	19	—	21	18		Sonic Temple
"Sweet Soul Sister"	1990	42	109	—	—	16	—	37	—	—	14		Sonic Temple
"Wild Hearted Son"	1991	40	27	47	4	13	—	13	—	4	12		Ceremony
"Heart of Soul"	1992	51	92	—	—	—	—	—	—	21	41		Ceremony
"The Witch"	1992	—	112	—	—	—	—	36	—	—	—		Cool World (soundtrack)
"Sanctuary MCMXCIII"	1993	15	51	—	—	22	—	9	—	—	—		Pure Cult: For Rockers, Ravers, Lovers, and Sinners
"Coming Down (Drug Tongue)"	1994	50	40	69	—	—	—	—	—	26	13		The Cult
"Star"	1994	65	70	—	—	—	—	—	—	—	—		The Cult
"Painted on My Heart"	2000	—	198	—	—	—	—	—	—	—	26		Gone in 60 Seconds (soundtrack)
"Rise"	2001	86	—	—	—	—	—	—	125	19	3		Beyond Good and Evil
"Breathe"	2001	—	—	—	—	—	—	—	—	—	—		Beyond Good and Evil
"True Believers"	2002	—	—	—	—	—	—	—	—	—	—		Beyond Good and Evil
"Dirty Little Rockstar"	2007	—	—	45	—	—	—	—	—	—	38		Born into This
"Illuminated"	2008	—	—	—	—	—	—	—	—	—	—		Born into This
"Every Man and Woman Is a Star"	2010	—	—	—	—	—	—	—	—	—	—		Non-album singles
"Embers"	2010	—	—	—	—	—	—	—	—	—	—		Non-album singles
"For the Animals"	2012	—	—	—	—	—	—	—	—	—	—		Choice of Weapon
"Honey from a Knife"	2012	—	—	—	—	—	—	—	—	—	—		Choice of Weapon
"Lucifer"	2012	—	—	—	—	—	—	—	—	—	—		Choice of Weapon
"The Wolf"	2012	—	—	—	—	—	—	—	—	—	—		Choice of Weapon
"Twisted and Bleeding"	2012	—	—	—	—	—	—	—	—	—	—		Weapon of Choice
"Deeply Ordered Chaos"	2016	—	—	—	—	—	—	—	—	—	—		Hidden City
"Dark Energy"	2016	—	—	—	—	—	—	—	—	—	—		Hidden City
"Hinterland"	2016	—	—	—	—	—	—	—	—	—	—		Hidden City
"G.O.A.T."	2016	—	—	—	—	—	—	—	—	—	—		Hidden City
"Give Me Mercy"	2022	—	—	—	—	—	—	—	—	—	—		Under the Midnight Sun
"—" denotes releases that did not chart or were not released in that territory.
