= Jamie Stewart (English musician) =

British bassist

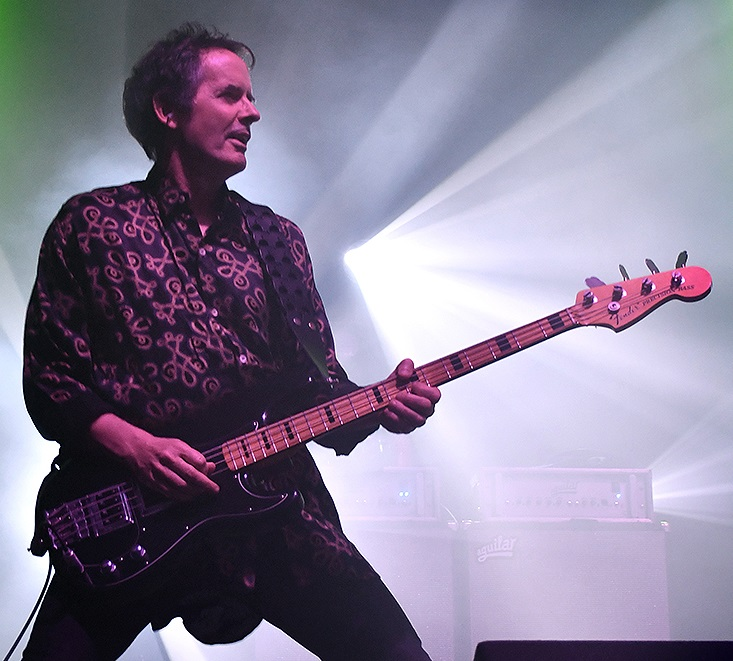
- Jamie Stewart playing with Death Cult at Birmingham O2 Institute 14 Nov 2023

Background information
- Born: James Alec Stewart; 31 January 1964 (age 62); Harrow, Middlesex, England
- Genres: Post-punk; gothic rock; hard rock
- Occupation: Musician
- Instruments: Bass; guitar; keyboards
- Years active: 1983–1994, 2009, 2013, 2023

James Alec Stewart (born 31 January 1964) is a retired British musician who was the bassist of the post-punk/hard rock band The Cult. He recorded on The Cult's first four albums, Dreamtime, Love, Electric and Sonic Temple.

== Early life ==
Stewart was born in Harrow, Middlesex, on 31 January 1964. His mother, Myra (née Kidd), was a dancer with the International Ballet, and his father, Donald Stewart, was a violinist with the London Symphony Orchestra.

== Performance career ==
Stewart's musical career began playing guitar in Harrow-based band Ritual. Ritual gigged extensively in London's gothic rock/post-punk scene but rarely outside. Ritual's first output was a four-song radio session for BBC Radio 1 DJ John Peel in 1981. This led the way for a self-compiled and released cassette album, Songs for a Dead King, which was available only at gigs and by mail order. In 1982, Ritual signed to Red Flame Records and released one single, "Mind Disease" (1982) and one EP, Kangaroo Court (1983).

=== The Cult ===
In 1983, Ritual drummer Ray Mondo was recruited by Ian Astbury and Billy Duffy to form a new act entitled Death Cult (later The Cult). Stewart, after prompting from Mondo, attended auditions for the Death Cult bass player role and was subsequently hired.

From their beginning, Death Cult had a commitment to Beggars Banquet Records. In April 1983, Death Cult released an EP, Death Cult, on Beggars offshoot label Situation Two. In Sep 1983, Ray Mondo was replaced by Nigel Preston, Duffy's former bandmate in Theatre of Hate. At the time, Preston was playing with post-punk/goth band Sex Gang Children. A drummer swap was agreed between the bands, feeling that the playing styles of each drummer were better suited to the future direction of the other band. In October 1983, Death Cult released a single, "God's Zoo", with Preston on drums. The group changed their name to The Cult minutes before a live performance of the song "Spiritwalker" on the Channel 4 series The Tube. Stewart continued to play bass on all Cult recordings until 1990. He also played keyboards on several songs on the Sonic Temple album.

Following the recording of the band's third long-player, Electric, in 1987, the band felt that a second guitarist was needed on tour to reproduce the music of Electric. The role was filled by Stewart, having a familiarity with the songs and style, and being a former guitarist. For the tours, Kid Chaos (formerly of Zodiac Mindwarp and the Love Reaction) was recruited as bassist. Stewart continued to appear on bass in the first two promotional videos for Electric: "Love Removal Machine" and "Lil Devil". The five-piece line-up with Stewart on guitar was used for the 3rd video, Wild Flower. Stewart moved back to bass for the recording and touring of the Sonic Temple album. Keyboards for the recording were played by John Webster (Aerosmith, Tom Cochrane), and by Webster and John Sinclair (Ozzy Osbourne, Uriah Heep) on tour.

In 1990, following the tour, Stewart left the band, citing the distance that had grown between Astbury and Duffy, and a wish to start a family, as the main reasons for departure. His final appearance with The Cult was at the Universal Amphitheater in Los Angeles on 3 April 1990.

== Music production career ==
Having relocated to London, Stewart moved into studio work, producing an EP on Beggars Banquet Records for Goat, featuring Adrian Oxaal, later guitarist with James. During this time, Stewart joined Adrian Smith of Iron Maiden in a low-key band The Untouchables (which became Psycho Motel), playing informal gigs, mainly around London. In 1991, following the birth of his daughter, he moved with his family to Toronto, Canada, to pursue a production career. In 1992, Stewart produced the Joni Mitchell song "A Case of You" with Toronto-based band Sloan for the tribute album Back to the Garden. The song became the album's most successful single. In 1993, Stewart worked at Le Studio, in Morin Heights, Quebec, with the band Les Respectables. The recordings remained unreleased until some songs surfaced on their 1996 album Full Regalia. Stewart worked with Ripped in 1994 to produce songs for their debut album Bloodshot. While in Toronto, Stewart also took other opportunities for studio performance. In 1993, he co-wrote, produced and played bass on an EP for Polygram Canada with Toronto singer/guitarist Ed McDonald, entitled Masterstroke. In 1994, he played bass on Memory Thief, the second album by Polygram artists Lost & Profound.

== Post-music career ==
Stewart retired from the music industry in 1994 and moved back to the United Kingdom with his family. He now works in software and user interface design, and lives in Oxfordshire with his family.

== Reunions with The Cult ==
On 10 October 2009, on a tour celebrating the 25th anniversary of the release of the Love album, Stewart played bass again with his former bandmates on stage at London's Royal Albert Hall for two encores, Phoenix and She Sells Sanctuary. He was also joined onstage by the original drummer for one of the recordings, Mark Brzezicki (then formerly of Big Country).

Again, for the 25th anniversary of the release of the Electric album in 2013, Stewart made several other guest appearances:

- 26 October 2013 - Glasgow Barrowland - Love Removal Machine (on guitar), Horse Nation & Spiritwalker (on bass)
- 31 October 2013 - London Roundhouse - Love Removal Machine (guitar), Horse Nation & Spiritwalker (on bass)
- 1 November 2013 - London Roundhouse - Sun King & Horse Nation (on bass).

For the 40th anniversary of the release of the Death Cult EP (the band's first release), Stewart made two guest appearances:

- 14 November 2023 - Birmingham, O2 Institute - Ressurection Joe & Horse Nation (on bass)
- 21 November 2023 - London, Electric Brixton - Ressurection Joe & Horse Nation (on bass)

== Discography ==
=== Ritual ===
- 1981 - Songs for a Dead King (album)
- 1982 - "Mind Disease" (single)
- 1983 - Kangaroo Court (EP)

=== Death Cult ===
- 1983 - Death Cult (EP)
- 1983 - "Gods Zoo" (single)

=== The Cult ===
- 1984 - "Ressurection Joe" (single)
- 1984 - Dreamtime
- 1985 - Love
- 1987 - Electric
- 1989 - Sonic Temple

=== Masterstroke ===
- 1993 - Masterstroke (EP)
