= Dreamtime (The Cult album) =

Studio album by the Cult
- Released: 31 August 1984
- Studio: Rockfield (Rockfield, Wales)
- Genre: Gothic rock; post-punk; alternative rock
- Length: 37:15
- Label: Beggars Banquet
- Producer: John Brand, Joe Julian

The Cult chronology
Death Cult (1983)	Dreamtime (1984)	Love (1985)

Singles from Dreamtime
- 1. "Spiritwalker" Released: 11 May 1984; 2. "Go West" Released: 3 August 1984

Dreamtime is the debut studio album by the English rock band the Cult. Released on 31 August 1984 by Beggars Banquet Records, it peaked at No. 21 on the UK Albums Chart and was later certified silver by the BPI after having sold 60,000 copies. The first single, "Spiritwalker", peaked at No. 1 on the UK Independent Singles Chart. Dreamtime has subsequently been reissued (or in some cases bootlegged) in roughly 30 countries worldwide.

Lyrics to the song "Horse Nation" are taken almost verbatim from the non-fiction book Bury My Heart at Wounded Knee (1970). "Spiritwalker" is a reference to shamanism, while "Dreamtime" is inspired by mythology of the Aboriginal Australians and 'Butterflies' is a reference to the Hopi ceremonial butterfly dance. "A Flower in the Desert" is a reworking of the Southern Death Cult's song "Flowers in the Forest".

The music of the album is characterized as dramatic, moody, dark psychedelic, with "crystalline guitar not that far off from what U2 was going after". In 1985 Ian Astbury noted that the Cult were "like Big Country and U2, only better!".

The record was originally being produced by Joe Julian, but after recording the drums, the band decided to replace him, and Beggars Banquet suggested John Brand. The record was ultimately produced by Brand, but guitarist Billy Duffy has said that the drum tracks used on the record were those produced by Julian, as band drummer Nigel Preston had become too unreliable by that time.

Professional ratings
Review scores
Source	Rating
AllMusic	4/5 stars
The Encyclopedia of Popular Music	2/5 stars
The New Rolling Stone Album Guide	2/5 stars

== Album information ==
The record was largely recorded at Rockfield Studios, near Monmouth, Wales, in late March and early April 1984, mixed at Eel Pie Studios, Twickenham, from 16 to 24 April 1984, and mastered on 27 April 1984.

This record was originally intended to be released on Situation Two, with a catalogue number SITU 57 (or 12). This pressing was to include the original version of "Go West (Crazy Spinning Circles)" which uses a psychedelic phasing on the end choruses. Only a small handful of white label test pressings were made of this record before the band decided they didn't like that version. They subsequently recorded a new version of the song after signing to Beggars Banquet Records, and that second, more "finalised" version of the song was released. The re-recording of "Go West (Crazy Spinning Circles)" was done at Livingston Recording Studios on 22 June 1984. The original test pressing of "Dreamtime" stands as one of the more rare and collectable studio Cult vinyl pressings.

"Bone Bag" (sometimes listed as "Bonebag") was the original B-side on the "Spiritwalker" single. "Sea and Sky" was the original B-side of "Go West (Crazy Spinning Circles)" and "Ressurection Joe" (not spelled in the correct form "Resurrection Joe" but intentionally misspelled) was a new single recorded in November 1984 and released on 14 December 1984. They are included as bonus tracks on the original CD pressings in all countries except the original CD pressing in the Netherlands, where only the 10 original songs are present. The first CD version in the Netherlands also uses different artwork for the back cover. In Germany, the CD version incorrectly lists 13 songs on the back cover, but only includes the 10 original songs as were on vinyl.

== Release ==
Dreamtime was released on 31 August 1984 as a double album, accompanied by a nine-song live album titled Dreamtime Live at the Lyceum, recorded at the Lyceum Theatre in London on 20 May 1984. There were only 30.000 copies of the live record originally manufactured. It was also released in the UK with different artwork, and on 23 November 1984 also as a picture disc LP.

The record was released in Malaysia for the first time in July 1990, with the second version of the artwork used for the cover. In Czechoslovakia in January 1991, two versions of this record were released by Globus International: one is on black vinyl, and the other is on blue vinyl. The blue vinyl version is apparently quite rare. Both Czechoslovak pressings use the artwork from the second British pressing. In 2003, the album was remastered and reissued on CD in the Russian Federation, Belarus and Lithuania with the three bonus tracks and different artwork. In October 2004 the record was also remastered and reissued on CD with different artwork in Japan.

== Track listing ==
All songs written by Ian Astbury and Billy Duffy, except where noted.

=== LP ===
Side one
No.	Title	Length
1.	"Horse Nation"	3:45
2.	"Spiritwalker"	3:39
3.	"83rd Dream"	3:38
4.	"Butterflies"	3:00
5.	"Go West (Crazy Spinning Circles)"	3:59

Side two
No.	Title	Writer(s)	Length
1.	"Gimmick"		3:33
2.	"A Flower in the Desert"	Ian Astbury, Barry Jepson, David Burroughs, Haq Qureshi	3:42
3.	"Dreamtime"		2:47
4.	"Rider in the Snow"		3:11
5.	"Bad Medicine Waltz"		5:55

=== Compact Cassette ===
Side one

The complete album is recorded on the first side.

1. "Horse Nation"
2. "Spiritwalker"
3. "83rd Dream"
4. "Butterflies"
5. "Go West (Crazy Spinning Circles)"
6. "Gimmick"
7. "A Flower in the Desert"
8. "Dreamtime"
9. "Rider in the Snow"
10. "Bad Medicine Waltz"

Side two

Dreamtime Live at the Lyceum is recorded on the second side.

1. "83rd Dream"
2. "Gods Zoo"
3. "Bad Medicine"
4. "Dreamtime"
5. "Christians"
6. "Horse Nation"
7. "Bone Bag"
8. "Brothers Grimm"
9. "Moya"

=== CD bonus tracks ===
1. "Bone Bag" – 3:47
2. "Sea and Sky" – 3:32
3. "Ressurection Joe" – 6:07
4. "Love Removal Machine" ("Peace" version) (Russian and eastern Europe only)
5. "Zap City" (Russian and eastern Europe only)

There is a slightly longer version of "Spiritwalker", with a running time of 3:54.

In France, a special promotional 12" record was issued, consisting of three tracks:

1. "Spiritwalker"
2. "Go West (Crazy Spinning Circles)"
3. "83rd Dream" (recorded live at the Lyceum on 20 May 1984)

The full album was later released in France, packaged with the live album Dreamtime live at the Lyceum.

The Japanese LP features a photo of the band on the front cover, instead of the original artwork. When remastered and reissued on CD in 1996, only the 10 original songs were included.

On the original Canadian vinyl pressing and cassette, the track listing is re-arranged for unknown reasons:

1. A1 "Go West" – 3:59
2. A2 "Spiritwalker" – 3:39
3. A3 "83rd Dream" – 3:38
4. A4 "Butterflies" – 3:00
5. A5 "Bad Medicine Waltz" – 5:55
6. B1 "Horse Nation" – 3:45
7. B2 "A Flower in the Desert" (Astbury, Jepson, Burroughs, Quereshi) – 3:42
8. B3 "Dreamtime" – 2:47
9. B4 "Rider in the Snow" – 3:11
10. B5 "Gimmick" – 3:33

== Personnel ==
Credits are adapted from the Dreamtime liner notes.

The Cult

- Ian Astbury – lead vocals
- Billy Duffy – guitars
- Jamie Stewart – bass, backing vocals
- Nigel Preston – drums, percussion

with:

- Mich Ebeling – backing vocals on "Gimmick"

== Charts ==
Chart (1984–85)	Peak position
Swedish Albums (Sverigetopplistan)	46
UK Albums (OCC)	21

Chart (2024)	Peak position
Scottish Albums (OCC)	26
UK Independent Albums (OCC)	17
UK Rock & Metal Albums (OCC)	4

== Certifications ==
Region	Certification	Certified units/sales
United Kingdom (BPI)	Silver	60,000^{^}
^{^} Shipments figures based on certification alone.
