= Death Cult (EP) =

- Original 12" EP

EP by Death Cult
- Released: 1983; 1996 (as "Ghost Dance")
- Genre: Gothic rock; post-punk
- Length: 23:21
- Label: Situation Two (SIT 23T)
- Producer: Jeremy Green

Death Cult chronology
| Death Cult (1983) | Dreamtime (1984) |

1996 cover
- 1996 re-release

Death Cult is the debut four-track EP by the post punk/gothic rock band Death Cult (who later shortened their name to the Cult). Released in July 1983 on the Situation Two label, the EP reached No. 2 on the UK Independent Chart. The EP is often erroneously referred to as Brothers Grimm (after the song title of the first track on the A-side of the record).

In 1988, the EP was released on compact disc coupled with the contents of the group's only other official release, "Gods Zoo", retaining the same eponymous title.

In 1996, the contents of the 1988 CD release were remastered and reissued with an additional four tracks from a BBC Radio 1 session. This release was titled Ghost Dance.

== Development ==
Death Cult formed in April 1983 when Ian Astbury (formerly of Southern Death Cult) and Billy Duffy (formerly of Theatre of Hate) joined forces after meeting each other when Southern Death Cult supported Theatre of Hate on a number of dates during the latter's tour. By June 1983, the group had written 10 songs, four of which would be recorded for their debut EP.

The first track, "Brothers Grimm", was originally written by Duffy and UK Decay vocalist Steve "Abbo" Abbott after both musicians had left their respective bands (and prior to Duffy joining Astbury to form Death Cult).

Two of the songs delved into Astbury's respect and fascination with the Native American cultures previously explored during his tenure with Southern Death Cult. "Ghost Dance" was inspired by the Ghost Dance religious movement as well as the writings and teachings of spiritual leader Wovoka, whose name is mentioned in the lyrics ("Wovoka had a vision"...), while the lyrics to "Horse Nation" were taken nearly verbatim from the book Bury My Heart at Wounded Knee.

Astbury and Duffy's interest in the Vietnam War was also in evidence, both in the photograph that appeared on the picture sleeve, as well as the lyrical content of the final track, "Christians", which directly referenced the war and featured lyrics referring to the Chiêu Hồi program and the tiger stripe camouflage pattern worn by United States infantrymen. At the time, certain groups within the British post punk subculture developed a "trendy" fascination with the Vietnam War that spilled over into dress and music. According to Astbury:

"My interest in Viet Nam started when I saw 'Apocalypse Now'. What they were doing was the closest to some uplifting experience that you can get".

During Death Cult's 1983 tour, Duffy was often seen wearing a green beret with a Vietnam War-era 5th Special Forces Group beret flash along with tiger stripe fatigues. Duffy later referred to it as "Apocalypse Now chic".

== Original 1983 EP ==
The original EP was released only in 12" format, solely in the United Kingdom, France and Japan. The photograph that appeared on the front sleeve was taken by renowned Vietnam War photographer Tim Page. The group's logo and the lettering on the EP picture sleeve were done by bassist Jamie Stewart.

The initial UK 12" release included a folded A4 insert written by Tom Vague which included information on the group in the form of a series of short interviews.

=== UK 12": Situation Two SIT 23T ===
1. "Brothers Grimm"
2. "Ghost Dance"
3. "Horse Nation"
4. "Christians"

=== French 12": Situation Two/New Rose Records SIT 23T ===
1. "Brothers Grimm"
2. "Ghost Dance"
3. "Horse Nation"
4. "Christians"

=== Japanese 12": Nexus International K15P 517 ===
1. "Brothers Grimm"
2. "Ghost Dance"
3. "Horse Nation"
4. "Christians"

== 1988 compact disc ==
In 1988, the group's label, Beggars Banquet (via its subsidiary label Situation Two, which Death Cult was originally signed to), issued a compact disc edition, marked "SPECIAL LOW PRICE CD FEATURING THE COMPLETE RECORDINGS", in the UK only. This CD collected the original EP along with the single "Gods Zoo". The material was allegedly remastered, but no evidence exists to support this claim. This CD release retained the eponymous title of the original EP.

=== UK CD: Situation Two SIT2329CD ===
1. "Gods Zoo" – 3:25
2. "Brothers Grimm" – 3:31
3. "Ghost Dance" – 3:58
4. "Horse Nation" – 3:24
5. "Christians" – 3:48
6. "Gods Zoo (These Times)" – 5:09

== Ghost Dance ==
In 1996, Beggars Banquet remastered and reissued the 1988 eponymous Death Cult compact disc. This new collection was released in the UK and US simultaneously (marking the first time Death Cult material was released in the US). The compact disc collection featured new artwork and was given the title Ghost Dance.

In addition to the material from the 1988 compact disc, the 1996 CD appended a four-track David Jensen BBC Radio 1 session engineered by Dale Griffin and broadcast on 27 October 1983. One of these BBC tracks, "A Flower in the Desert", was a rewritten version of "Flowers in the Forest", originally written and recorded by Astbury's earlier group Southern Death Cult. This track had previously been released as the B-side to the 1984 "Spiritwalker" single, released shortly after the group changed its name to the Cult. "Too Young" was later rewritten as "Rider in the Snow", appearing as such on the group's debut album, Dreamtime. "With Love" was originally titled "The Waste of Love", and only changed to "With Love" when it was recorded during the BBC radio session. The song was later rewritten and recorded (as the Cult) during the "Go West (Crazy Spinning Circles)" recording sessions on 22 June 1984, under the working title of "Ship of Fools". The track was then retitled "Sea and Sky" and released as the B-side of the "Go West (Crazy Spinning Circles)" single.

=== UK/US CD: Beggars Banquet BBL 2008 CD ===
1. "Gods Zoo" – 3:25
2. "Brothers Grimm" – 3:31
3. "Ghost Dance" – 3:58
4. "Horse Nation" – 3:24
5. "Christians" – 3:48
6. "A Flower in the Desert" – 3:14
7. "Too Young" – 2:56
8. "Butterflies" – 2:47
9. "With Love" – 3:25
10. "Gods Zoo (These Times)" – 5:09

== Personnel ==
- Ian Astbury – lead vocals
- Billy Duffy – guitars
- Jamie Stewart – bass guitar
- Ray Mondo – drums (on the original four-track EP)
- Nigel Preston – drums (on "Gods Zoo" single and BBC sessions)

== Death Cult 8323 Tour and Associated Releases ==
In 2023, The Cult commemorated their 40th anniversary by reviving their early moniker, Death Cult, for a special 8323 tour. The November 2023 Death Cult tour included performances in Los Angeles and several cities across the UK and Ireland, where the band revisited material from their early days, including tracks from Southern Death Cult, Death Cult, and their first two albums, Dreamtime and Love.

Setlists for the Death Cult 8323 tour were identical at each gig, featuring the following songs in order: 83rd Dream, Christians, Gods Zoo, Brothers Grimm, Ghost Dance, Butterflies, A flower in the Desert, Resurrection Joe, The Phoenix, Horse Nation, Go West, Dreamtime, Spiritwalker, Rain, with Moya and She Sells Sanctuary presented as the encore.

The tour included original Death Cult members Ian Astbury (vocals) and Billy Duffy (guitar), supplemented by The Cult band members Charlie Jones (bass) and John Tempesta (drums). The tour also saw the release of a dual double A-side single, featuring new songs ‘FLESH AND BONE’ and ‘C.O.T.A’. This single was essentially developed as an expanded edition of the Cults 2022 album Under The Midnight Sun.

Additionally, in 2024, Ian Astbury and Billy Duffy curated the previously released Death Cult collection Ghost Dance, and recompiled the tracks for a 2024 release titled Paradise Now. Track listing for Paradise Now was as follows:

A1. Horse Nation

A2. Ghost Dance

A3. Brothers Grimm

A4. Christians

B1. Gods Zoo (These Times)

B2. A Flower In The Desert

B3. Butterflies

B4. With Love (Sea and Sky).
