= Go West (Crazy Spinning Circles) =

Single by The Cult

from the album Dreamtime
- B-side: "Sea And Sky"; "Brothers Grimm (live)"
- Released: 3 August 1984
- Genre: Post-punk, gothic rock
- Label: Beggars Banquet (BEG 115)
- Songwriters: Ian Astbury; Billy Duffy
- Producer: John Brand

The Cult singles chronology
"Spiritwalker" (1984)	"Go West (Crazy Spinning Circles)" (1984)	"Ressurection Joe" (1984)

"Go West (Crazy Spinning Circles)" is a single by the English rock band The Cult and was released on 3 August 1984. Often truncated as just "Go West", it is the second single from the Dreamtime album.

== B-Side ==
The B-side of the seven-inch single is the song "Sea And Sky". The song originated from when the group was still Death Cult where it was entitled "The Waste Of Love". When the group recorded the song for the radio sessions for the David Jenson show on BBC Radio One (later released on the compact disc collection of Death Cult recordings entitled Ghost Dance) the title of the song had been changed to "With Love". When "Sea And Sky" was finally recorded by The Cult, during the "Go West (Crazy Spinning Circles)" recording sessions (on 22 June 1984), it was done so under the working title of "Ship Of Fools". "Sea And Sky" was later, in 1986, included on the first United Kingdom compact disc versions of the Dreamtime album (Beggars Banquet catalogue number BEGA 57CD) as a bonus track.

The B-side to the twelve-inch single is also "Sea And Sky" along with a live version of the Death Cult song "Brothers Grimm". The song was recorded live on 20 May 1984 at the Lyceum Ballroom in London, England. Most of the entire live performance from that concert was originally released, on 10 September 1984, on the Dreamtime Live At The Lyceum album sans "Brothers Grimm".

== Music video ==
No "official" music video was recorded for the song "Go West (Crazy Spinning Circles)". When the group released the music video collection Pure Cult: The Singles 1984-1995 (the companion to the Pure Cult: The Singles 1984–1995 album) their live performance of "Go West (Crazy Spinning Circles)" from their concert film Dreamtime Live At The Lyceum (the companion to their 1984 Dreamtime Live At The Lyceum album) was included in place of a "proper" music video.

What some thought was a "promotional video" for "Go West (Crazy Spinning Circles)" was posted on YouTube in 2010. The music video featured the group lip synching the single version of song in front of an open-air public swimming pool (something seemingly awkward for the group). It was later discovered that the music video was recorded for the German television show Music Convoy and was not an "official" music video for the song. During the performance, Astbury holds the back of his guitar up to the camera. A sign, reading "SIGN US NOW!," is taped to the back. According to Duffy, "At the time we didn’t have a record deal in Europe and Ian stuck a sign to the back of his guitar saying ‘SIGN US NOW’. It was also just before we recorded Ressurection Joe in Germany."

== Charts ==
Chart	Peak position
UK Singles Chart	90

== Track listing ==
Release information pertains to the United Kingdom release only.

=== 7": Beggars Banquet BEG 115 ===
1. "Go West (Crazy Spinning Circles)"
2. "Sea and Sky"

=== 12": Beggars Banquet BEG 115T ===
1. "Go West (Crazy Spinning Circles)"
2. "Sea and Sky"
3. "Brothers Grimm (live)"

== Foreign releases ==
Along with the United Kingdom releases, "Go West (Crazy Spinning Circles)" was also released as a single in Australia/New Zealand and France.

The Australia/New Zealand version was only issued in the seven-inch single format and was distributed by the Roxy Records label (catalogue number 104371). It was released in 1984, but the specific day and month of the release is unknown. The track listing is the same as the United Kingdom seven-inch single.

The French version was only issued in the seven-inch single format and was distributed by the Disc' AZ label (catalogue number 1012). It was released in 1984, but the specific day and month of the release is unknown. Unlike the United Kingdom release, the A-side is "Go West (Crazy Spinning Circles)" while the B-side is "Dreamtime".

== Personnel ==
- Ian Astbury - vocals
- Billy Duffy - guitars
- Jamie Stewart - bass guitar
- Nigel Preston - drums

Also credited:

- John Brand - producer and engineer
- David Fathers - sleeve design
