= Spiritwalker (song) =

Single by The Cult

from the album Dreamtime
- B-side: "A Flower in the Desert"; "Bone Bag"
- Released: 11 May 1984
- Genre: Gothic rock
- Label: Situation Two (SIT 33)
- Songwriters: Ian Astbury; Billy Duffy
- Producer: John Brand

The Cult singles chronology
"Gods Zoo" (1983)	"Spiritwalker" (1984)	"Go West" (1984)

"Spiritwalker" is a song by English rock band the Cult, released on 11 May 1984 as the lead single from their debut studio album Dreamtime.

== Song origins ==
"Spiritwalker" was written while the group was still called Death Cult. It was never recorded by the group but was integrated into their set list during their second United Kingdom tour in late 1983. The song, musically, was much different, but, lyrically, it was nearly the same as the final recorded version.

The song has its origins in Ian Astbury's earlier group, Southern Death Cult. On 29 October 1981, at the group's second live performance ever, Southern Death Cult played Queen's Hall in Bradford, England. During their set they performed an untitled song (later referred to as "The War Song") that featured many of the same lyrics as "Spiritwalker". The song was never performed by Southern Death Cult again.

Apparently, Astbury incorporated the lyrics of "The War Song" into the creation of "Spiritwalker" but no credit was given to the other members of Southern Death Cult and it is unknown whether they contributed to the writing of the original version.

== B-side ==
The B-side of the seven-inch single is a radio session of "A Flower in the Desert" recorded while the group was still Death Cult. The song, an acoustic version, was recorded for the David Jensen show on BBC Radio One and was engineered by Dale Griffin. The song was first broadcast on 27 October 1983. The song "A Flower in the Desert" is a re-written version of "Flowers in the Forest" originally recorded by Astbury's earlier group Southern Death Cult. Thus the song is credited as Astbury/Jepson/Burroughs/Qureshi (the members of Southern Death Cult). The song, along with the entire radio session, was later released on the compact disc collection of Death Cult recordings entitled Ghost Dance.

The B-side to the twelve-inch single is also "A Flower in the Desert" along with the song "Bone Bag" (which was recorded during the Dreamtime album sessions). "Bone Bag" (often erroneously spelled "Bonebag") was later, in 1986, included on the first United Kingdom compact disc versions of the Dreamtime album (Beggars Banquet catalogue number BEGA 57CD) as a bonus track.

== Music video ==
No "official" music video was recorded for the song "Spiritwalker". When the group released the music video collection Pure Cult: The Singles 1984-1995 (the companion to the Pure Cult: The Singles 1984–1995 album) their live performance of "Spiritwalker" on The Tube was included in place of a "proper" music video. The performance is one of notoriety as it was broadcast live on 13 January 1984, and announcer Jools Holland introduced the group as "...just now The Cult". The group, prior to the performance, had decided to change its name from Death Cult to simply The Cult.

== Chart positions ==
Chart	Peak position
UK Indie Chart	1
UK Singles Chart	77

== Track listings ==
Release information pertains to the United Kingdom release only.

7": Situation Two SIT 33

1. "Spiritwalker"
2. "A Flower in the Desert"

12": Situation Two SIT 33T

1. "Spiritwalker"
2. "A Flower in the Desert"
3. "Bone Bag"

== Personnel ==
- Ian Astbury – vocals
- Billy Duffy – guitars
- Jamie Stewart – bass guitar
- Nigel Preston – drums

Also credited:

- John Brand – producer and engineer
- David Fathers/The Engine Room – sleeve design
