= Ritual (post-punk band) =

UK post-punk band

- Origin: Harrow, London, England
- Genres: Post-punk, gothic rock
- Years active: 1981–1983
- Label: Red Flame Records
- Past members: Errol Blyth; Mark Bond; Steve Pankhurst; Ray Mondo; Jamie Stewart

Ritual was an early 1980s Harrow-based post-punk band that were later aligned with the early UK-based gothic rock movement. The group is commonly associated with Death Cult (later the Cult), which two Ritual members later joined.

== History ==
=== Formation ===
Ritual was formed out of the remnants of the Harrow-based punk band General Confusion, which included Steve Pankhurst on drums. Formed in December 1979, General Confusion played its first gig at Watford College supporting Toyah.

After two name changes (Suppressed Emotion and Stigma) and personnel shifts (a new drummer, Peter Gould, was brought onboard and Pankhurst switched to saxophone), the band finally settled on a permanent line-up and the name Ritual in 1981. The new line-up consisted of Errol Blyth (vocals), Mark Bond (bass), Pankhurst (saxophone), Ray Mondo (simply referred to as "Ray", drums), and the newly recruited 17-year-old Jamie Stewart (guitar). The band's name did not carry any religious significance but was instead chosen for its "sharpness" and the fact "it goes with the music to an extent".

=== Demo and John Peel ===
The group began writing songs which were, according to Bond, "written together as a band, although most of the music comes from the more musical Jamie". The band compiled a four-track demo (consisting of "Human Sacrifice", "Mind Disease", "Playtime" and "Brides") to shop around to independent labels in London. As part of their self-promotion of the demo, the band described themselves as a cross between the Birthday Party and Theatre of Hate. The band distributed approximately 60 copies of the tape and received positive responses from two labels (Situation Two and 4AD) but neither was ready to sign the band.

Ritual played their first gig at the Windsor Castle in Harrow Road in September 1981. Shortly afterward, they were invited to perform on John Peel's BBC Radio 1 show. The session was recorded on 7 December 1981 (consisting of "Playtime", "Mind Disease", "Human Sacrifice" and "Brides") at Maida Vale 4 and later broadcast on 14 December 1981.

=== Songs for a Dead King ===
While shopping their demo around, the band compiled a cassette tape of live tracks and demo recordings to sell to fans. Titled Songs for a Dead King, it was structured with the material in the format the band wished to record its first album. The majority of the material was never fully developed and only two of the songs made it to the band's two subsequently released singles. A prophetically-named track (for Stewart), which appeared on the A-side, was simply titled "Nine".

=== Touring and "Mind Disease" ===
After receiving national exposure via the Peel session, the band spent the majority of 1982 gigging around London, playing some of the more infamous punk and post-punk venues in support of groups like Sex Gang Children. By mid-year the band had signed with Dave Kitson's independent Red Flame Records, and on 6 October 1982, released the "Mind Disease" 7" single. More London touring followed in support of the release and the band found themselves headlining gigs as well as supporting groups like UK Decay.

=== Kangaroo Court and dissolution ===
In February 1983, the band released the Kangaroo Court EP on Red Flame, followed by a few more gigs. By March 1983, the band had dissolved. Mondo was the first to leave, being recruited by Ian Astbury and Billy Duffy to form Death Cult. Stewart was later suggested by Ray Mondo for the bass slot (after the band had auditioned some 30 hopefuls) even though Stewart was a guitarist. Stewart accepted the position and remained with the band after the name change (to the Cult).

Blyth and Bond, along with drummer Colin Rocks and ex-UK Decay guitarist Steve Spon, formed in Excelsis in 1983. The band released a number of singles and an album before breaking up in 1984. Bond later former the short-lived band Famous. After the split of Ritual, Pankhurst dropped out of the music business.

== Personnel ==
- Errol Blyth - vocals
- Mark Bond - bass guitar
- Steve Pankhurst - saxophone
- Ray Mondo - drums
- Jamie Stewart - guitars

== Discography ==
=== Studio albums ===
- Songs for a Dead King cassette (1981, self-released)

=== Singles and EPs ===
- "Mind Disease" 7" single (1982, Red Flame Records)
- Kangaroo Court 12" EP (1982, Red Flame Records)

=== Compilation appearances ===
- "Mind Disease" on In Goth Daze (1994, Anagram Records/Cleopatra Records)
- "Mind Disease" on Flesh, Fangs & Filigree (1994, Dressed to Kill)
- "Questioning the Shadow" on Gothic Rock 3 - Black on Black - Best of 80's Collection (1998, Jungle Records)
- "Mind Disease" on Night Creatures - The Best of Gothic Rock (1999, Music Club)
