= Ressurection Joe =

Single by The Cult
- B-side: "Ressurection Joe (Hep Cat Mix)"; "Ressurection Joe (Long Version)"; "Ressurection Joe (Hep Cat Mix Long Version)"
- Released: 14 December 1984
- Genre: Post-punk, gothic rock
- Label: Beggars Banquet (BEG 122)
- Songwriters: Ian Astbury; Billy Duffy
- Producer: Chris Kimsey

The Cult singles chronology
"Go West" (1984)	"Ressurection Joe" (1984)	"She Sells Sanctuary" (1985)

"Ressurection Joe" is a single by the English rock band the Cult. It was released as a non-album single on 14 December 1984.

"Ressurection Joe" was later, in 1986, included on the first United Kingdom compact disc versions of Dreamtime as a bonus track.

== Spelling ==
Often the title of the song is indicated as being misspelled. While the correct spelling of the word is resurrection, Jamie Stewart stated that he accidentally misspelled the word when designing the single's picture sleeve and the misspelled title was retained as the "official" song title. On some subsequent compilation releases, the group's label has spelled the word in conventional form.

== Song origins ==
The song was originally written and performed live under the title "The Ressurection Song". The earliest versions bore no resemblance, musically or lyrically, to the final version. The song was gradually transformed into the final version during the later months of 1983, while the group was on its second concert tour of the United Kingdom.

== B-side ==
The B-side of the seven-inch single is a remixed version of the song entitled "Ressurection Joe (Hep Cat Mix)". The title of the remix comes from a lyric in the song and is, in turn, a reference to a 1940s slang term.

The A-side to the twelve-inch single features an extended version of the song entitled "Ressurection Joe (Long Version)". The B-side of this release features the title song along with an extended and remixed version, entitled "Ressurection Joe (Hep Cat Mix Long Version)".

== Music video ==
An official music video was produced for the song. For years this fact was unknown, due to no exposure or promotion of the music video, until it was released on the music video collection Pure Cult: The Singles 1984-1995 (the companion to the Pure Cult: The Singles 1984–1995 album).

The music video, filmed at Kirkstall Abbey Museum (in Leeds, England), is set in a semi-Victorian/Dickensian period with Ian Astbury as "Joe", a snake oil salesman hawking "Joe's Ressurection Elixir". Astbury is initially rejected by patrons of a bar as he tries to hawk his elixir. The band's other members appear as invalids (Billy Duffy as a blind man, Nigel Preston as a cripple, and Jamie Stewart with some bad orthodontics) that are miraculously "cured" by the elixir. After seeing the others "cured", the people Astbury had been trying to sell the elixir to earlier gladly accept bottles and drink it. They are all promptly turned from adults to infants as Astbury and the rest of the group exit the tavern.

Interspersed in the music video is live footage of the group performing. The live footage is from their concert film Dreamtime Live At The Lyceum (the companion to their 1984 Dreamtime Live At The Lyceum album). The footage is spliced from different songs they performed, as "Ressurection Joe" was not performed during that concert.

== Chart positions ==
Chart (1984)	Peak position
UK Singles (Official Charts)	74

== Track listing ==
Release information pertains to the United Kingdom release only.

=== 7": Beggars Banquet BEG 122 ===
1. "Ressurection Joe"
2. "Ressurection Joe (Hep Cat Mix)"

=== 12": Beggars Banquet BEG 122T ===
1. "Ressurection Joe (Long Version)"
2. "Ressurection Joe"
3. "Ressurection Joe (Hep Cat Mix Long Version)"

== Picture sleeve ==
The picture sleeve to both the seven-inch and twelve-inch releases were produced in both die-cut and non die-cut versions. Further both die-cut and non die-cut versions were produced with untextured and textured sleeves. To date there is no explanation as to why this was done.

== Double pack ==
In 1991 a record store in England advertised for sale, in Goldmine Magazine, the layout for a seven-inch "double pack" gatefold version of "Ressurection Joe". The layout carried the catalogue number BEG 122D (which was consistent with Beggars Banquet catalogue numbering at the time) and was allegedly to have collected all four versions of "Ressurection Joe" on two seven-inch records.

This packaging version was never released and, to date, the validity of the item has never been verified. However, the group's label did release other seven-inch "double pack" versions of some of the group's future singles in exactly the same format which lends some credibility to the claim that the item was "in the works".

== Japanese release ==
"Ressurection Joe", as a single, was released only in the United Kingdom and Japan. The Japanese version was only issued in the twelve-inch EP format and was distributed by the Nexus International/Jade Music label (catalogue number K15P-516). It was released in 1985, but the specific day and month of the release is unknown. The track listing is radically different from the United Kingdom single as follows:

=== 12": Nexus International K15P-516 ===
1. "Ressurection Joe"
2. "Sea and Sky"
3. "A Flower in the Desert"
4. "Dreamtime"
5. "Ressurection Joe (Bonus Track)"

== Personnel ==
- Ian Astbury - vocals
- Billy Duffy - guitars
- Jamie Stewart - bass guitar
- Nigel Preston - drums

Also credited:

- Chris Kimsey - producer
