= Gods Zoo =

Single by Death Cult
- B-side: "Gods Zoo (These Times)"
- Released: 23 October 1983
- Genre: Post-punk; gothic rock
- Length: 3:26
- Label: Situation Two (SIT 29)
- Songwriter: Death Cult
- Producer: Jeremy Green

Death Cult singles chronology
"Gods Zoo" (1983)	"Spiritwalker" (1984)

"Gods Zoo" is the first single by the English post-punk/gothic rock band Death Cult (who later shortened their name to the Cult), released on 23 October 1983 by Situation Two. The song is often, erroneously, spelled "God's Zoo" (with an apostrophe in the word "Gods", indicating possessive case).

== Picture sleeve ==
No credit is given to the design of the picture sleeve for the single. The front features the group's name centered between four stereoscopic printed television sets. Within each television is an image. Clockwise from top left the images are as follows: (1) the group's Mickey Mouse "skull" logo; (2) a nude female drawing (artist unknown, but the image is often credited to singer Ian Astbury, even though this has never been confirmed); (3) a portion of a Tim Page photograph of ARVN soldiers interrogating a Viet Cong suspect (the group's first release, the eponymous Death Cult EP, also featured a Tim Page Vietnam photograph on its picture sleeve, and both Astbury and guitarist Billy Duffy have expressed an interest in the history of the Vietnam War, which was also apparently a trend in the United Kingdom at the time); (4) a portion of a photograph of Jimi Hendrix (one of the group's influences).

== B-side ==
The single is labeled A SIDE, and AA SIDE (for the B-side), which is an extended and remixed version of the title track titled "Gods Zoo (These Times)".

== History ==
"Gods Zoo" was released while the group was still recording and performing as Death Cult (they would not change their name to the Cult until 13 January 1984) and was intended to be the lead single for Death Cult's first album (tentatively titled A Flower in the Desert). A joint 4AD and Beggars Banquet 7" promotional EP, titled A Sampling Above the Rest (catalogue number VTO 1), featured "Gods Zoo (These Times)" as a promotional track with the following description: "taken from the forthcoming Death Cult cassette and album".

A full-length Death Cult album never materialized. The group's developed material was eventually incorporated into what would become the Dreamtime album, which was released nearly a year later and under the group's new name. Conspicuously missing from the finalized album was "Gods Zoo", making it a stand-alone single.

== Chart positions ==
Chart	Peak position
UK Indie Chart	4

== Track listings ==
Release information pertains to the United Kingdom release only.

7": Situation Two SIT 29

1. "Gods Zoo" – 3:26
2. "Gods Zoo (These Times)" – 5:09

12": Situation Two SIT 29T

1. "Gods Zoo" – 3:26
2. "Gods Zoo (These Times)" – 5:09

== Australian release ==
"Gods Zoo", as a single, was released only in the UK and Australia. The Australian version was only issued in the 7" format and was distributed by the Powderworks Records label (catalogue number POW 0179). It was released in 1983, but the specific day and month of the release is unknown. The track listing was the same as the UK single.

== Personnel ==
- Ian Astbury - vocals
- Billy Duffy - guitars
- Jamie Stewart - bass guitar
- Nigel Preston - drums

Also credited:

- Jeremy Green - producer and engineer

"Gods Zoo" marked the debut of Death Cult's new drummer, Nigel Preston. Preston replaced the group's previous drummer, Ray Mondo, just prior to entering the studio to record the single.

Preston had previously worked with Duffy in Theatre of Hate. After his departure from Theatre of Hate, Preston joined Sex Gang Children in September 1982. When Preston was recruited to join Death Cult in September 1983, he essentially "swapped" with Ray Mondo. Ray Mondo played his last gig with Death Cult on 19 September 1983 at the Brixton Ace in London. Shortly afterwards, he filled the vacant drummer position with Sex Gang Children.

== Death Cult EP ==
Both tracks from the "Gods Zoo" single were collected, along with the contents of the earlier eponymous EP, on a single compact disc in 1988, simply titled Death Cult. The same material was remastered and reissued (along with some radio session material) in 1996 as Ghost Dance.

== A Historical Debt ==
In 1991, the Cult donated the track "Gods Zoo", royalty free, for the compilation album A Historical Debt. released by Beechwood Music Limited. The album's intent was to help independent groups and labels caught in the wake of the Rough Trade Distribution collapse.
