= The Cult =

English rock band

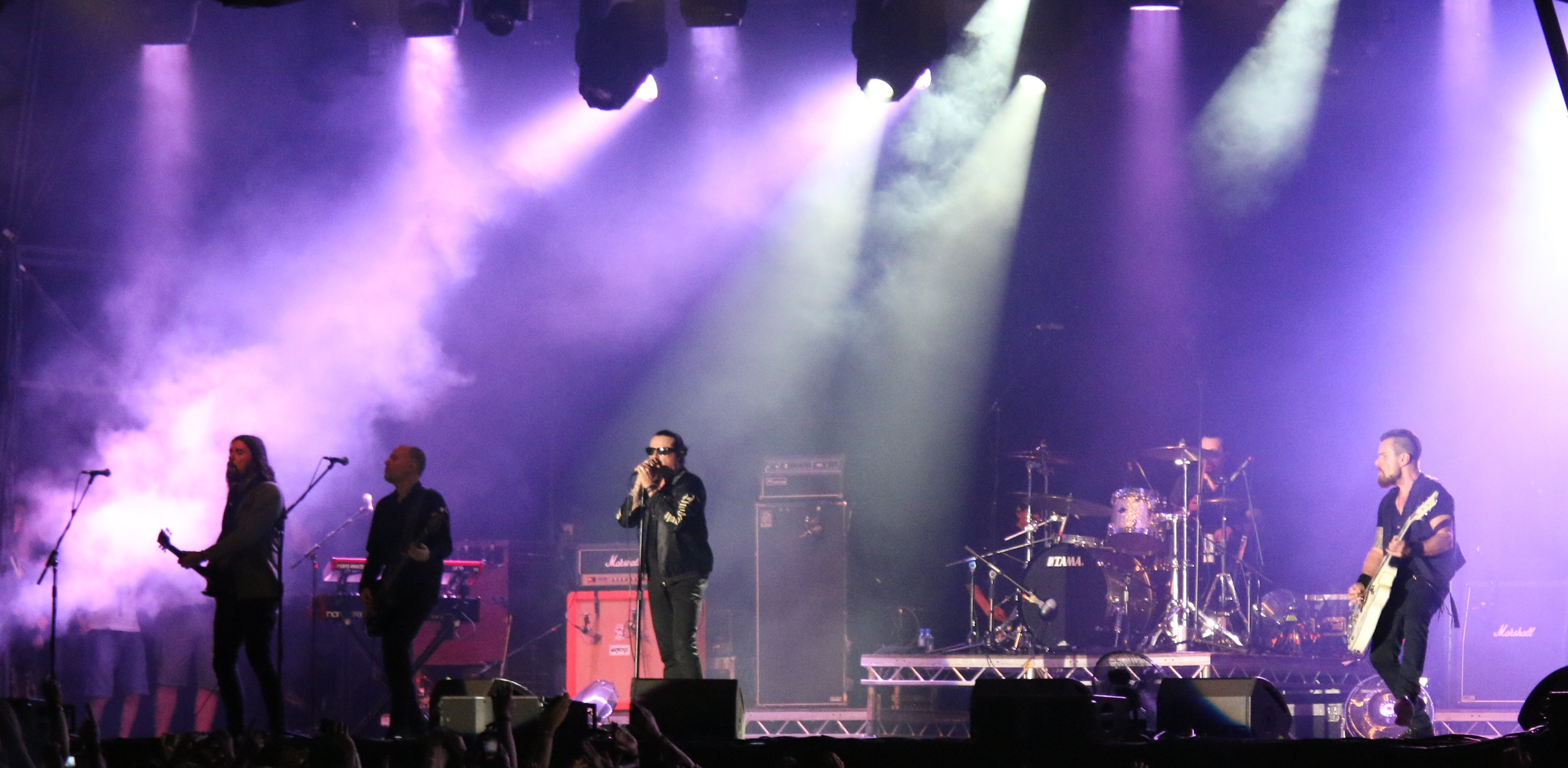
- The Cult headlining Ramblin' Man Fair 2018

Background information
- Also known as: Death Cult (1983–1984, 2023–present)
- Origin: Bradford, England
- Genres: Hard rock; gothic rock; alternative rock; heavy metal; post-punk (early)
- Works: Discography
- Years active: 1983–1995; 1999–2002; 2006–present
- Labels: Situation Two; Beggars Banquet; Atlantic; Roadrunner; Sire; Warner Bros.; Aderra; Cooking Vinyl; Dine Alone; Black Hill
- Spinoff of: Southern Death Cult
- Members: Ian Astbury; Billy Duffy; Charlie Jones
- Past members: Jamie Stewart; Ray Mondo; Nigel Preston; Les Warner; Kid Chaos; Matt Sorum; Michael Lee; Scott Garrett; Kinley Wolfe; Craig Adams; Martyn LeNoble; Chris Wyse; Damon Fox; Grant Fitzpatrick; John Tempesta
- Website: thecult.us

The Cult are an English rock band formed in Bradford in 1983. Before settling on its current name in January 1984, the band had performed under the name Death Cult, which was an evolution of the name of lead vocalist Ian Astbury's previous band Southern Death Cult. They gained a dedicated following in the United Kingdom in the mid-1980s as a post-punk and gothic rock band, with singles such as "She Sells Sanctuary", before breaking into the mainstream in the United States in the late 1980s establishing themselves as a hard rock band with singles such as "Love Removal Machine". Since its initial formation in 1983, the band have had various line-ups: the longest-serving members are Astbury and guitarist Billy Duffy, who are also their two main songwriters.

The Cult's debut studio album Dreamtime was released in 1984 to moderate success, with its lead single "Spiritwalker" reaching No. 1 on the UK Indie Chart. Their second studio album, Love (1985), was also successful, charting at No. 4 in the UK and including singles such as "She Sells Sanctuary" and "Rain". The band's third studio album, Electric (1987), launched them to new heights of success, also peaking at No. 4 in the UK and charting highly in other territories, and spawned the hit singles "Love Removal Machine", "Lil' Devil" and "Wild Flower". On that album, the Cult supplemented their post-punk sound with hard rock; the polish on this new sound was facilitated by producer Rick Rubin. After moving to Los Angeles, where the band have been based for the remainder of their career, the Cult continued the musical experimentation of Electric with its follow-up studio album Sonic Temple (1989), which marked their first collaboration with Bob Rock, who would produce several of the band's subsequent studio albums. Sonic Temple was their most successful studio album to that point, entering the Top 10 on the UK and US charts, and included one of the band's most popular songs "Fire Woman".

By the time of their fifth studio album Ceremony (1991), tensions and creative differences began to surface between the band members. This resulted in the recording sessions for Ceremony being held without a stable line-up, leaving Astbury and Duffy as the only two official members, and featuring support from session musicians on bass guitar and drums. The ongoing tension had carried over within the next few years, during which the band recorded one more studio album – The Cult (1994) – before disbanding in 1995. The Cult reformed in 1999 and released their seventh studio album Beyond Good and Evil two years later. The commercial failure of the album and resurfaced tensions led to the band's second dissolution in 2002. The Cult reunited once again in 2006, and have since released four more studio albums: Born into This (2007), Choice of Weapon (2012), Hidden City (2016) and Under the Midnight Sun (2022).

== History ==
=== Early history (1981–1984) ===
The band's origins can be traced to 1981, in Bradford, Yorkshire, where lead vocalist and songwriter Ian Astbury formed a band called Southern Death Cult. The name was chosen with a double meaning. It was derived from the academic term Southern Death Cult, used to describe a cluster of 14th-century Native American groups now classified as the Southeastern Ceremonial Complex. The name Southern Death Cult also inspired by what the band viewed was the centralisation of political and economic power in Southern England (including the power of the music industry); there has long been a perceived notion of an England North–South divide based on social, historic and economic reasons. Astbury was joined by guitarist Buzz Burrows, bassist Barry Jepson and drummer Aki Nawaz Qureshi; they performed their first show at the Queen's Hall in their hometown of Bradford on 29 October 1981. The band were at the forefront of an emerging style of music, in the form of post-punk and gothic rock, they achieved critical acclaim from the press and music fans.

The band signed to independent record label Situation Two, an offshoot of Beggars Banquet Records, and released a three-track, triple A-side single, "Moya", in 1982. They toured through England headlining some shows and touring with Bauhaus and Theatre of Hate. Southern Death Cult played their final performance in Manchester during February 1983, meaning after only 16 months the band were over. A compilation album named The Southern Death Cult was released, this being a collection of the single, radio sessions with John Peel for Radio One and live performances – one of which an audience member recorded with a tape recorder.

In April 1983, Astbury teamed up with guitarist Billy Duffy and formed the band "Death Cult". Duffy had been in the Nosebleeds (along with Morrissey, later of the Smiths), Lonesome No More and then Theatre of Hate. In addition to Astbury and Duffy, the band also included bassist Jamie Stewart and drummer Raymond Taylor Smith (later known as Ray Mondo), both from the Harrow, London based post-punk band, Ritual. Death Cult made their live debut in Oslo, Norway on 25 July 1983 and also released the Death Cult EP in the same month, then toured through mainland Europe. In September 1983, a deal was made to switch drummers, Mondo would be replaced by Nigel Preston, as the drummer for Sex Gang Children and Preston would join Death Cult. The single "Gods Zoo" was released in October 1983. Another European tour, with UK dates, followed that autumn. To tone down their name's gothic connotations and gain broader appeal, the band changed its name to the Cult in January 1984 before appearing on the Channel 4 television show, The Tube.

The Cult's debut studio album, Dreamtime, was recorded at Rockfield Studios, in Monmouth, Wales in 1984. The record was to be produced by Joe Julian, but after recording the drum tracks, the band decided to replace him with John Brand. Brand produced the record, but guitarist Duffy has said the drum tracks were produced by Julian, as Preston had become unreliable.

The band recorded the songs which later became known as "Butterflies", "(The) Gimmick", "A Flower in the Desert", "Horse Nation", "Spiritwalker", "Bad Medicine (Waltz)", "Dreamtime", "With Love" (later known as "Ship of Fools", and also "Sea and Sky"), "Bone Bag", "Too Young", "83rd Dream", and one untitled outtake. It is unknown what the outtake was, or whether it was developed into a song at a later date. Songs like "Horse Nation" showed Astbury's intense interest in Native American issues, with the lyrics to "Horse Nation", "See them prancing, they come neighing, to a horse nation", taken almost verbatim from the book Bury My Heart at Wounded Knee (1970), while "Spiritwalker" dealt with shamanism, and the record's title and title track are overtly influenced by Australian Aboriginal beliefs.

On 4 April 1984, the Cult released the single "Spiritwalker", which reached No. 1 on the independent charts in the UK, and acted as a teaser for their forthcoming studio album Dreamtime. This was followed that summer by a second single, "Go West (Crazy Spinning Circles)", before the release of Dreamtime in September; the album reached No. 21 in the UK, and sold over 100,000 copies in the UK alone. On 12 July 1984, the band recorded five songs at the BBC Maida Vale 5 studio for a Richard Skinner session. Before and after the album's release, the Cult toured throughout Europe and England before recording another single, "Ressurection Joe" (UK No. 74), released that December. Following a Christmas support slot with Big Country, the Cult toured Europe with support from the Mission (then-called the Sisterhood). Dreamtime was released initially only in the UK, but after its success, and as the Cult's popularity grew worldwide, it was issued in approximately 30 countries.

=== Mainstream success (1985–1990) ===
In May 1985, the Cult released their fourth single, "She Sells Sanctuary", which peaked at No. 15 in the UK and spent 23 weeks in the Top 100. The song was recently voted No. 18 in VH1's Indie 100. In the following month, after his increasingly erratic behaviour, Preston was fired from the band. Big Country's drummer Mark Brzezicki was picked to replace Preston, and was also included in the music video for "She Sells Sanctuary". The Cult then finished recording their second studio album, Love, in July and August 1985. The band's music and image shifted from their punk-oriented roots to 1960s psychedelia influences. Love was a chart success, peaking at No. 4 in the UK and selling 100,000 copies there toward a total of 500,000 copies throughout Europe, as well as 100,000 in Australia and 500,000 copies in the United States. Love reached number 20 on the charts in the Netherlands, where it remained for 32 weeks. To date, the record has sold over two and a half million copies worldwide.

From late September 1985 to June 1986, the band went on a worldwide tour with new drummer Les Warner (who had played with Julian Lennon and Johnny Thunders). Two more singles from the Love album followed; "Rain" (charting in the UK at No. 17) and "Revolution" (charting in the UK at No. 30). Neither charted in the US. Another single, "Nirvana", was issued only in Poland. The album version of "Rain", as well as the remix "(Here Comes the) Rain", were used in the Italian horror film Demons 2 (1986). Once back in England, the band booked themselves into the Manor Studios in Oxfordshire, with producer Steve Brown (who had produced Love), and recorded over a dozen new songs. The band were unhappy with the sound of their new studio album, titled Peace, and they decided to go to New York so producer Rick Rubin could remix the first single, "Love Removal Machine".

Rubin agreed to work with the band, but only if they re-recorded the song. Rubin eventually talked them into re-recording the entire album. The band's record company, Beggars Banquet, was displeased with this, as two months and £250,000 had already been spent on the record. However, after hearing the initial New York recording, Beggars Banquet agreed to proceed. The first single, "Love Removal Machine", was released in February 1987, and the new version of the album appeared in April that year, now renamed as Electric, reaching No. 4 and eventually outselling Love. The band toured with Kid Chaos (also known as "Haggis" and "The Kid") on bass guitar, with Stewart on rhythm guitar. Two more singles, "Lil Devil" and "Wild Flower", were released during 1987. A few tracks from the original Peace album appeared on the single versions of "Love Removal Machine", and "Lil Devil". The full Peace album would not be released until 2000, when it was included as Disc 3 of the Rare Cult box set.

In the US, the Cult, now consisting of Astbury, Duffy, Stewart, Warner and Kid Chaos, were supported by a then-unknown Guns N' Roses. The band also appeared at Roskilde Festival in Denmark in June 1987. During the Australian part of the world tour, the band wrecked £30,000 worth of equipment, and as a result they could not tour Japan as no company would rent them new equipment. At the end of the tour the Electric album had been certified Gold in the UK, and sold roughly 3 million copies worldwide, but the band were barely speaking to each other by then. Haggis left the band at the end of the Electric tour to form the Four Horsemen for Rubin's Def American label. Astbury and Duffy fired Warner and their management team Grant/Edwards, and moved to Los Angeles with Stewart. Warner sued the band several times for his firing, as well as for what he considered were unpaid royalties for his performance on the Electric album, resulting in lengthy court battles. The Cult signed a new management deal and wrote 21 new songs for their next album.

For the next studio album, Stewart returned to playing bass guitar, and John Webster was brought in to play keyboards. The band used Chris Taylor to play drums during rehearsals and record the demos, with future Kiss drummer Eric Singer performing during the second demo recording sessions. The Cult eventually recruited session drummer Mickey Curry to fill the drumming role and Aerosmith sound engineer, Bob Rock, to produce. Recorded in Vancouver from October to December 1988, and released in April of the following year, Sonic Temple went Top 10 in both the UK and the US, where it was certified Gold and Platinum respectively. The band went on tour in support of the new album and new single "Fire Woman" (UK No. 15) (NZ No. 1), with yet another new drummer, Matt Sorum, and Webster as keyboardist. The next single, "Edie (Ciao Baby)" (UK No. 25) has become a regular song at concerts for many years.

In Europe, the band toured with Aerosmith, and in the US, after releasing another single "Sun King" (UK No. 42), they spent 1989 touring in support of Metallica before heading out on their own headlining tour later that same year. The fourth and final single, "Sweet Soul Sister" (UK No. 38), was released in February 1990, with the video having been filmed at Wembley Arena in London on 25 November 1989. "Sweet Soul Sister" was partially written in Paris and was inspired by the bohemian lifestyle of that city. Released as a single in February 1990, the song was another hit in the UK, and reportedly reached number one on the rock charts in Brazil. After playing a show in Atlanta in February 1990, the band's management told Astbury that his father had just died of cancer; as a result, the remainder of the tour was cancelled after a final leg of shows were performed in April. After the tour ended, the band were on the verge of breaking up due to Stewart retiring and moving to Canada to be with his wife, and Sorum leaving to join Guns N' Roses.

In 1990, Astbury organised the Gathering of the Tribes festival in Los Angeles and San Francisco with artists such as Soundgarden, Ice-T, Indigo Girls, Queen Latifah, Iggy Pop, the Charlatans, the Cramps and Public Enemy appearing. This two-day festival drew 40,000 people. Also in 1990, a ten CD box set was released in the UK, containing rare songs from the Cult's singles. The CDs in this box set were all issued as picture discs with washi paper covers, housed in a white box called Singles Collection, or a black box called E.P. Collection '84 - '90. In 1991, director Oliver Stone offered Astbury the role of Jim Morrison in Stone's film The Doors. He declined the role because he was not happy with the way Morrison was represented in the film, and the role was ultimately played by Val Kilmer.

=== Ceremony and the lawsuit (1991–1993) ===
By 1991, Astbury and Duffy were writing again for their next studio album. During the demo recordings, Todd Hoffman and James Kottak played bass guitar and drums, respectively. During the actual album recording sessions, Curry was recruited again to play drums, with Charley Drayton on bass guitar, and various other performers. Astbury and Duffy's working relationship had disintegrated by that time, with the two men reportedly rarely even being in the studio together during recording. The resulting studio album Ceremony was released in September 1991 to mixed responses. The album climbed to US No. 34, but sales were not as impressive as the previous three studio albums, only selling around one million copies worldwide. Only two official singles were released from the record: "Wild Hearted Son" (UK No. 34, Canada No. 41) and "Heart of Soul" (UK No. 50), although "White" was released as a single only in Canada, "Sweet Salvation" was released as a single (as "Dulce Salvación") in Argentina in 1992, and the title track "Ceremony" was released in Spain.

The Cult's Ceremonial Stomp tour went through Europe in 1991 and North America in 1992. In 1991 the Cult played a show at the Marquee Club in London, which was recorded and released in February 1993, packaged with some vinyl UK copies of their first greatest hits release. Only a handful of CD copies of it were ever manufactured originally, however it was subsequently reissued on CD in 1999. An incomplete bootleg video of this show is also in circulation.

The band were sued by the parents of the Native American boy pictured on the cover of Ceremony, for alleged exploitation and for the unauthorised use of the child's image. The parents stated that the boy felt he had been cursed by the band's burning of his image, and was "emotionally scarred." This image of the boy is also burned in the video for "Wild Hearted Son". This lawsuit delayed the release of Ceremony in many countries including South Korea and Thailand, which did not see the album's release until late 1992, and it was unreleased in Turkey until the Cult played several shows in Istanbul in June 1993.

A world tour followed with backing from drummer Michael Lee (Page & Plant, Little Angels), bassist Kinley "Barney" Wolfe (Lord Tracy, Black Oak Arkansas), and keyboardist John Sinclair (Ozzy Osbourne, Uriah Heep) returning one last time, and the Gathering of the Tribes moved to the UK. Here artists such as Pearl Jam performed. The warm-up gig to the show, in a small nightclub, was dedicated to the memory of Nigel Preston, who had died a few weeks earlier at the age of 28. Following the release of the single "The Witch" (No. 9 in Australia) and the performance of a song for the 1992 Buffy the Vampire Slayer movie soundtrack entitled "Zap City", produced by Steve Brown and originally a B-side to "Lil' Devil", two volumes of remixes of "She Sells Sanctuary", called Sanctuary Mixes MCMXCIII, volumes one and two, and in support of Pure Cult: for Rockers, Ravers, Lovers, and Sinners, a greatest hits compilation which debuted at No. 1 on the British charts and later went to number one in Portugal, Astbury and Duffy fired the "backing band" and recruited Craig Adams (the Mission) and Scott Garrett for performances across Europe in 1993, with some shows featuring Mike Dimkich on rhythm guitar. This tour marked the first time the band performed in Turkey, Greece, and the Slovak Republic.

=== The Cult and first break-up (1994–1998) ===
With the same line-up still in place, the band released The Cult in October 1994, produced by Bob Rock. Astbury referred to the record as a collection of "very personal and very revealing" songs about his life, with the subject matter ranging from sexual abuse at the age of 15, to the death of Nigel Preston, to his directionless years spent in Glasgow in the late 1970s.

The record achieved little success, only reaching No. 69 in the US and No. 21 in the UK. Duffy remarked that he thought that the record wouldn't sell well due to the offensive lyrics. The record went to number one in Portugal also, but quickly dropped out of sight. The single "Coming Down (Drug Tongue)" was released with the band going on tour in support of the new album. Only one more single, "Star", was officially released with a live appearance on UK TV show The Word. "Star" began life in 1986 as "Tom Petty" and was recorded at the Sonic Temple demo sessions as "Starchild", being dropped by the band during rehearsals. In 1993, the song was resurrected and was finally completed for the record in 1994 as, just simply, "Star".

When the band began the Beauty's On the Streets tour in winter 1994, they augmented the line-up with James Stevenson on rhythm guitar. As with the Ceremony record several years earlier, no other official singles were released, but several other songs were released on a strictly limited basis: "Sacred Life" was released in Spain and the Netherlands, "Be Free" was issued in Canada and France. During this tour, the Cult made their first ever appearance in Norway.

During the Black Rain tour of South America in the spring of 1995, despite the fact that several more new songs had already been recorded, the tour was cancelled after an appearance in Rio de Janeiro in March, and the band broke up citing unspecified problems on a recent South American tour. Astbury started up a garage band called Holy Barbarians a few months later. The band made their debut at the 100 Club in London in February 1996 and released their first (and only) studio album Cream in May 1996, and toured throughout North America and Europe for the rest of 1996. The band started writing material for a second studio album in 1997, but the band was dissolved and Astbury began writing and recording a solo album. Throughout 1997 and 1998 Astbury recorded his debut solo studio album, originally to be titled Natural Born Guerilla, later called High Time Amplifier. Ultimately the album remained unreleased until June 2000 when it was released under the name Spirit\Light\Speed. Astbury played one solo concert in 1999.

In November 1996, a number of CD reissues were released: the band's American record company released High Octane Cult, a slightly updated greatest hits compilation released only in the US and Japan; The Southern Death Cult, a remastered edition of the fifteen-song compilation CD; a ten-song compilation CD by Death Cult called Ghost Dance, consisting of the untitled four-song EP, the single "God's Zoo", and four unreleased songs from a radio broadcast; and a remastered repackaging of the Dreamtime album, containing only the ten original songs from the record in their original playing order and almost completely different but original artwork. Dreamtime Live at the Lyceum was also remastered and issued on video and for the first time on CD, with the one unreleased song from the concert, "Gimmick".

=== First reunion, Beyond Good and Evil and second hiatus (1999–2005) ===
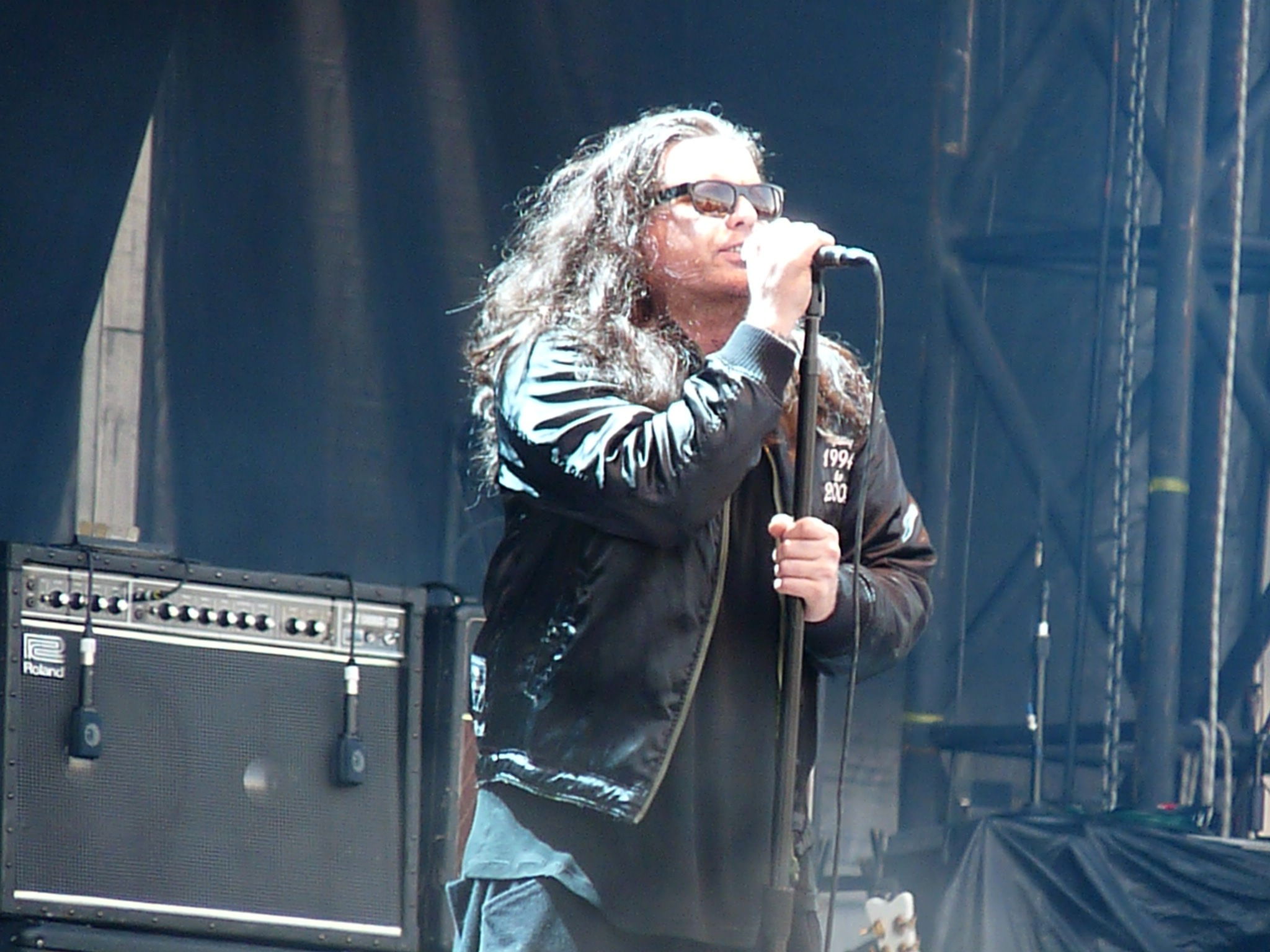
Frontman Ian Astbury in 2011

In 1999, Astbury and Duffy reformed the Cult with former drummer Matt Sorum and ex-Porno for Pyros bassist Martyn LeNoble. Their first official concert was at the Tibetan Freedom Concert in June 1999, after having rehearsed at shows in the Los Angeles area. The band's 1999 Cult Rising reunion tour resulted in a sold out 30 date tour of the US, ending with 8 consecutive sold out nights at the House of Blues in Los Angeles. In 2000, the band toured South Africa for the first time, and North and South America, and contributed the song "Painted on My Heart" to the soundtrack of the movie Gone in 60 Seconds. The song was featured prominently and the melody was fused into parts of the score. In June, Astbury's long-delayed debut solo studio album was finally released as Spirit\Light\Speed, but it failed to gain much success. In November 2000, another authorised greatest hits compilation was released, Pure Cult: The Singles 1984–1995, along with an accompanying DVD, which was later certified gold in Canada. The Cult, as well as Ian Astbury, performed on separate tracks on the Doors tribute album, Stoned Immaculate: The Music of The Doors, covering "Wild Child" and "Touch Me".

In November 2000, Beggars Banquet released 15,000 copies of a six-disc box set (with a bonus seventh disc of remixes for the first 5000 copies) titled Rare Cult. The box set consists of album out-takes, demos, radio broadcasts, and album B-sides. It is most notable for including the previously unreleased Peace album in its entirety. In 2001, the band signed to Atlantic Records and recorded a new studio album, Beyond Good and Evil, originally being produced by Mick Jones of Foreigner, until Jones bowed out to tour with Foreigner. Astbury and Duffy co-wrote a song with Jones, an odd occurrence, as in the past, neither Astbury or Duffy would co-write their material. Bob Rock was the producer, with LeNoble and Chris Wyse as recording bassists, as Mike Dimkich played rhythm guitar on tour, and Sorum returning as drummer. Although Sorum has previously toured with the band on the Sonic Temple tour in 1989, this was the first time that he had recorded a studio album with the band.

However, Beyond Good and Evil was not the comeback record the band had hoped for. Despite reaching No. 37 in the US, No. 22 in Canada, and No. 25 in Spain, sales quickly dropped, only selling roughly 500,000 copies worldwide. The first single "Rise", reached No. 41 in the US, and No. 2 on the mainstream rock charts, but Atlantic Records quickly pulled the song from radio playlists. Astbury would later describe the experience with Atlantic to be "soul destroying", after Atlantic tried to tamper with the lyrics, the record cover, and choice of singles from the record.

After the first single from the record, the band's working relationship with Atlantic was on paper only, with Atlantic pulling "Rise" from the radio stations playlists, and stopping all promotion of the record. The second single "Breathe" was only released as a radio station promo, and the final single "True Believers" was only on a compilation sampler disc released in January 2002 (after the Cult's tour had already ended). Despite "True Believers" receiving radio airplay in Australia, both singles went largely unnoticed, and both Astbury and Duffy walked away from the project. LeNoble rejoined the band for the initial dates in early 2001, and Billy Morrison filled in on bass guitar for the majority of the 2001 tour.

The European tour of 2001 was cancelled, largely due to security concerns after the 9/11 terrorist attacks, and the band flew back to the US to tour again with Aerosmith. But the eleven-week tour was considered by fans to be a disaster, as the band played only a brief rundown of their greatest hits. In October 2001, a show at the Grand Olympic Auditorium in Los Angeles was filmed for release on DVD. After the tour ended in December 2001, the band took most of 2002 off, apart from a few shows in the US to promote the release of the DVD, with Scott Garrett and Craig Adams rejoining the band.

Despite the commercial disappointment of Beyond Good and Evil and its supporting tour, the band was voted "Comeback of the Year" by Metal Edge readers in the magazine's 2001 Readers' Choice Awards.

In late 2002, Ian Astbury declared the Cult to be "on ice" indefinitely, after performing a brief series of dates in October 2002 to promote the release of the Music Without Fear DVD. During this second hiatus, Astbury performed as a member of the Doors (later dubbed the Doors of the 21st Century, later still renamed D21c, and most recently known as Riders on the Storm) with two of the original members of that group. D21c was sued numerous times, both by Jim Morrison's family and by drummer John Densmore. Astbury supposedly started work on recording another solo studio album that later became the backbone for the Cult's Born into This (2007).

At the same time, Duffy was part of Coloursound with bassist Craig Adams and ex-Alarm frontman Mike Peters, then Dead Men Walking (again with Peters) and later Cardboard Vampyres. Sorum became a member of the hard rock supergroup Velvet Revolver. In 2003, all of the Cult's records were issued on CD, with several bonus tracks being issued on the Russian, Belarusian, and Lithuanian versions. These eastern European releases had many printing mistakes on the jacket sleeves and lyric inserts. In October 2004, all of the Cult's records were again remastered and issued again on CD, this time in Japan in different cardboard foldout sleeves. "She Sells Sanctuary" appeared in the 2001 video game Gran Turismo 3: A-Spec, in the NTSC-U version and 2002 videogame Grand Theft Auto: Vice City, playing on rock station V-Rock.

=== Second reunion, Born into This and Capsule EPs (2006–2010) ===
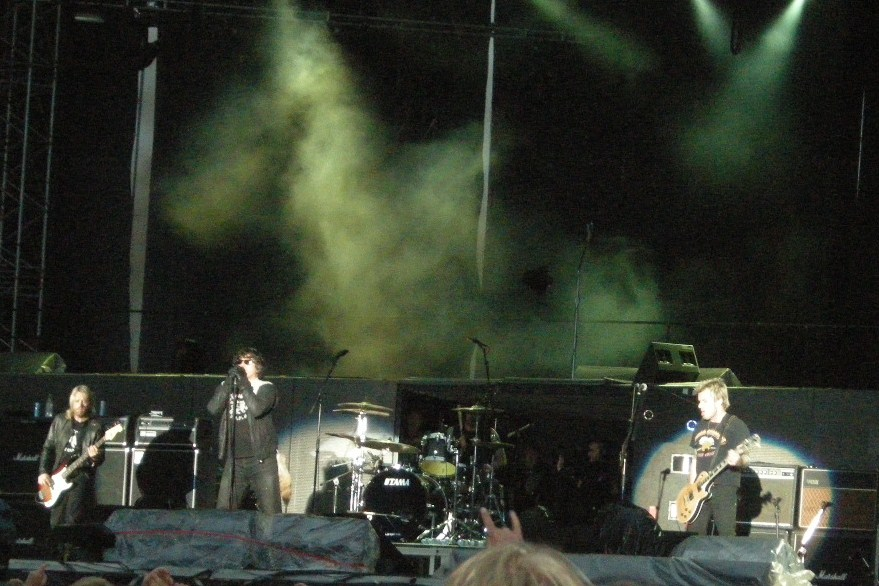
The Cult performing in 2009

Despite Astbury's previous statement from 2004 that a reunion would not happen, The Cult announced in January 2006 that they were reuniting for "some limited gigs" throughout the year. A month later, the band made their first live appearance in three-and-a-half years on The Late Late Show with Craig Ferguson. Their line-up consisted of Astbury (lead vocals), Duffy (lead guitar), John Tempesta (drums), Dimkich (rhythm guitar) and Wyse (returning as bassist). Their first stage show was held in March 2006 in San Francisco, California, at the Fillmore. The entire tour was recorded by Instant Live and sold after each show. In May, they did an eight date tour in Canada. Later that summer, they toured central and eastern Europe and played their first concerts in Bulgaria, Poland and Serbia. An eleven-date UK tour followed as well as several more dates in the United States, finishing with a South American tour in December. That year, Duffy began the band Circus Diablo with Billy Morrison, Sorum, Brett Scallions and Ricky Warwick.

During these tours, the band occasionally played an extended set, including several songs the band had not performed in decades: "King Contrary Man" and "Hollow Man", neither of which had been performed since 1987; also, "Libertine" was performed approximately three times, for the first time since 2000, and "Brother Wolf, Sister Moon", which was only performed one time since 1986 (for this particular song, the band played an abridged version which has never been performed before or since).

Astbury announced in February 2007 that he was leaving Riders on the Storm and returning to the Cult. He stated: "I have decided to move on and focus on my own music and legacy." The Cult was featured on Stuffmagazine.com's list of ultimate air guitar players. On 21 March 2007, it was announced that the band would be touring Europe with the Who. The first confirmed tour date was in Rotterdam, the Netherlands, in early June, with at least a dozen shows set to follow. The band played a gig in London's West End at the CC Club on 7 June 2007, along with nearly two dozen shows across continental Europe during summer. The tour also includes the first performance in Romania and Croatia.

On 29 May 2007, the band signed a deal with major metal label Roadrunner Records. Their eight studio album, titled Born into This was released on 16 October, and was produced by Martin "Youth" Glover, bassist for Killing Joke. Born into This was released as regular single disc and limited edition double disc, the second disk being a bonus 5-track CD holding the following tracks: "Stand Alone", "War Pony Destroyer", "I Assassin (Demo)", "Sound of Destruction (Demo)" and "Savages (Extended Version)". Prior to the album's release, the band played festival and headline dates, and supported the Who in Europe through summer 2007, with a US headline tour to follow.

The band's appearance at Irving Plaza in New York City in early November 2006 was filmed and was released in 2007. The Cult New York City, issued by Fontana North and is the Cult's first high definition DVD release. Meanwhile, Astbury lent vocals on two tracks of the 2007 Unkle studio album "War Stories", one of them being the first single from the album, "Burn My Shadow".

The band performed a UK and European tour in late-February and early-March 2008. On 24 March, they began their North American tour including a major 13-city tour in Canada. During September 2008, the Cult did a brief series of dates in the northeast United States, and they toured in Brazil as part of the South American tour in October 2008. By May 2008, according to The Gauntlet, the Cult were no longer under contract with Roadrunner Records. In October 2008, it was announced that the Cult would headline the inaugural Rock 'n' Roll Marathon in San Antonio, to be run 16 November 2008. The Cult announced plans for a tour showcasing their 1985 Love album across the US and then the UK in October where they would play at the Royal Albert Hall.

Coinciding with the remastered Love album and four-disc Omnibus boxed set, the Cult kicked off the long-awaited Love Live Tour in late summer. Performing their classic Love album in its entirety, each show was played with the Love tracks opening with "Nirvana" to "Black Angel". A quick intermission followed, then other Cult hits were played (varying by venue): "Sun King", "Dirty Little Rock Star", "Electric Ocean", "Illuminated". Then followed the favourites "Fire Woman", "Lil Devil", "Wild Flower", and lastly "Love Removal Machine". In the evening of 10 October 2009 at the Royal Albert Hall in London, the band performed a second encore with original Cult bassist Jamie Stewart and drummer Mark Brzezicki, who played drums with the band during the Love album recording sessions in July and August 1985. The band sold Love Live USB flash drives for each show during the tour.

The Cult continued their Love Live Tour and played dates in the United States, New Zealand, Australia, and Japan during 2010. The band finished recording a four-track "Capsule" with producer Chris Goss. Capsule 1 was said to be the first of three or four to be released sometime in summer 2010. Release formats include CD-DVD DualDisc, 12-inch vinyl, and digital downloads. Capsule 1 was released on 14 September 2010. The band officially announced the release of its first new studio recording since 2007, "Every Man and Woman Is a Star". The new single was released through the iTunes Store on 31 July 2010.

On 1 August 2010, the band played the sold-out music festival Sonisphere, which marked their first UK performance since the tour for their Love album. During the performance they debuted their new single, "Every Man and Woman is a Star", which was released on 1 August 2010. On 14 September 2010 the band embarked on a new US tour and released Capsule 1 in conjunction with media technology company Aderra Inc. and made it available in multiple formats including a CD-DVD DualDisc, USB flash drive, 12 inch vinyl, FLAC download and MP3 download. The collection includes a short film made by Ian Astbury and Rick Rogers.

On 26 October 2010 the band and Aderra Inc. announced the release of a new song, "Embers", for 1 November 2010 and Capsule 2 available through their web store on 16 November 2010. Pictures from the Cult's tour stop in Chicago on 28 October 2010 can be seen at a local radio station website.

On 17 September 2010, the band performed live at the Fall Frenzy concert at the Tempe Beach Park in Tempe, Arizona. Other bands that played at this concert were Stone Temple Pilots, Shinedown, and Sevendust.

On 4 December 2010, the band performed a live set for Guitar Center Sessions on DirecTV. The episode included an interview with the band by program host, Nic Harcourt.

=== Choice of Weapon and Hidden City (2011–2017) ===
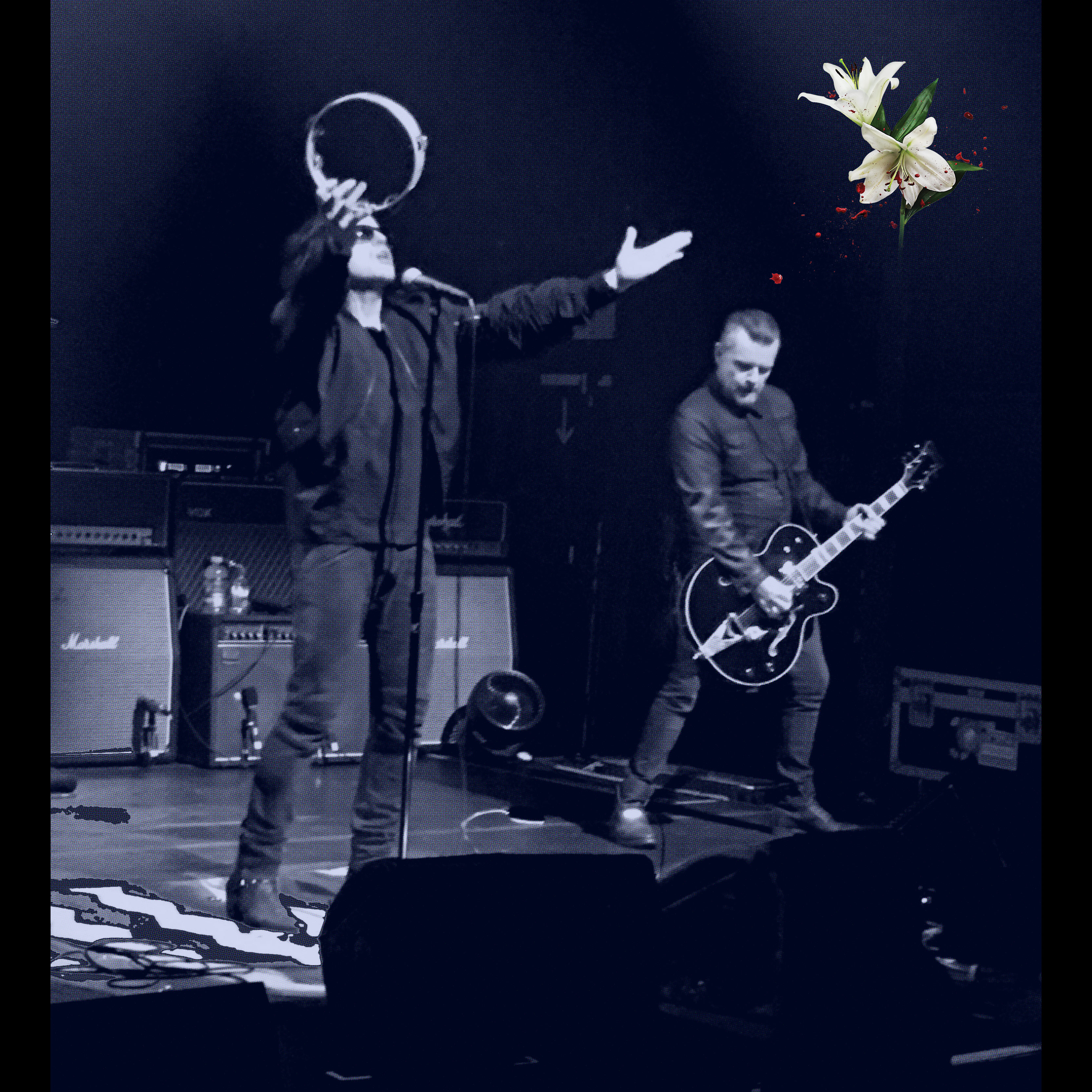
Founding members Ian Astbury (left) and Billy Duffy performing in 2016

During the Cult's concert at the Hammersmith Apollo in London on 21 January 2011 Ian Astbury declared that the Cult would be recording a new studio album directly after the tour. They also announced that they would be working with Chris Goss, who performed with Masters of Reality as an opening act the same evening. On 11 May 2011, it was announced that the Cult were signed to Cooking Vinyl Records, who would release the new studio album in early 2012. Commented guitarist Billy Duffy: "We are very much looking forward to returning to our U.K. roots in many ways working with Cooking Vinyl." Lead vocalist Ian Astbury added, "We look forward to a long and fruitful relationship with Cooking Vinyl." By May 2011, the band had been writing and recording new demos at its Witch Mountain studio hideaway in the Hollywood Hills, and began recording their new album at Hollywood Recording Studios. In October 2011, bassist Chris Wyse stated the album was almost finished and expected to be released in April 2012. Wyse also described it as a "Zep/Stooges mix of energy."

On 29 November 2011, it was announced that the album would be produced by Bob Rock, who provided the same role on Sonic Temple, The Cult and Beyond Good and Evil. The studio album, entitled Choice of Weapon, was released on 22 May 2012. The band partnered with Rolling Stone to premiere the first song from the album titled "Lucifer" on 30 January. On 5 February 2012, the Cult song "She Sells Sanctuary" was used as the soundtrack for a Budweiser beer commercial in a mashup with Flo Rida aired during Super Bowl XLVI. In May 2012 the Cult appeared on Jimmy Kimmel Live! and played "For the Animals".

On 28 September 2012, it was announced that the band would release Weapon of Choice, a "prequel" album to accompany the band's latest studio album, Choice of Weapon. The digital-only release, available exclusively on iTunes for two months only beginning 16 October, features the songs that were ultimately included in Choice of Weapon at an earlier stage of development. Explaining the motivations behind the release, lead vocalist Ian Astbury said that "These songs were turned over and over, forged in long rehearsals and writing sessions, and emanated from challenges both personal and professional. We put our guts into this; [Producer Chris] Goss was able to create an environment where the songs were born through playing and turning over lyrics, through hard work and intense sessions." Astbury added "These songs have an integrity and rawness of their own. In many ways it's a different album to the one we released and reveals the foundations of Choice of Weapon. We were able to close the doors and begin to explore spaces we had not been in for a while." The song "Twisted and Bleeding" was made available for free download at the band's website ahead of the full digital release.

On 20 June 2013, the band announced the release of Electric-Peace which comprises the entire Electric album plus the Peace album which was previously released on the now discontinued Rare Cult box set in 2000. It was released in the US on 30 July. In 2013, Mike Dimkich left the band and joined Bad Religion to replace guitarist Greg Hetson. James Stevenson, from the Beauty's on the Streets tour in 1994, replaced Dimkich as the Cult's rhythm guitarist.

In March 2013, Billy Duffy told the Argentine journalist Fabrizio Pedrotti that the Cult had begun work on a new studio album for a 2014 release. The band were expected to begin work on the album after they finish their 2013 world tour, where they played the Electric album in its entirety. In August 2014, Duffy added that the next album, which was not expected to be released before 2015 at the earliest, would "be more guitar heavy".

On 5 November 2015, it was announced that the Cult would release their new studio album, entitled Hidden City, on 5 February 2016. The album is said to be the final part of a trilogy that began with Born into This, and marks the fifth time Bob Rock had produced a Cult album. The band also announced that they had hired Australian-born bassist Grant Fitzpatrick (ex-Mink) as the replacement for Chris Wyse. Chris Chaney (Jane's Addiction, Camp Freddy) and producer Bob Rock performed session bass on the album. In support of Hidden City, the Cult opened for Guns N' Roses on the Not in This Lifetime... Tour.

In an October 2016 interview with PopMatters journalist J.C. Maçek III, Cult guitarist Billy Duffy spoke of the band's playlist while on tour, saying "Obviously you want to make an impactful [show]," he continues. "There are some practical, pragmatic decisions made. If you're playing to a crowd who are not very familiar with you, there's no point of going too deep but we do always make sure we play a new song. Like on Guns N' Roses' [tour] we had fifty minutes which is ten songs all in. So, you know we just made sure that in those ten songs we played 'Deeply Ordered Chaos' which we're proud of and it makes a certain statement. And it just alerts people to the fact that, yes, we have made a record in the last 30 years. You know and that's a good thing. Psychologically, that's the blood transfusion that we need. And we're very mindful, we have a very loyal fan base. We don't pander as you well know."

=== Under the Midnight Sun (2018–2022) ===
In an April 2018 interview with Guitar World, guitarist Billy Duffy was asked if an eleventh studio album by the Cult was in the works. He replied, "Never say never! Ian and I enjoy the process of making new music, and we feel it's vital to keep the band healthy, even if it's pretty much in the law of diminishing returns area now. Who knows if it will be a whole album a series of singles or an EP? I can say new Cult music will be forthcoming, but these days we don't rush it as there's no point. Quality is key. We are past the point of having to release stuff so if we feel it's good enough, then we will release it in some shape or another."

On 2 April 2018, a tour of the United States of America called "Revolution 3 Tour" was announced for the summer. They performed as one of the three headliners, along with Stone Temple Pilots and Bush.

In April 2019, the Cult announced that they would celebrate the 30th anniversary of the release of their fourth studio album Sonic Temple with a world tour, which began on 2 May in Houston, Texas and was expected to wrap up in 2020.

In a June 2019 interview with LA Weekly, lead vocalist Ian Astbury stated that the Cult were "long overdue" to release new music. He was quoted as saying: "We do have some stuff we've been working on, but it's yet to see the light of day." Six months later, Astbury told Atlantic City Weekly that the band was going to start working on new music in 2020: "We've got a few pieces lying around in various stages of completion. The intention is to get together in the New Year and take a look at what we've got and decide how we are going to go about moving forward. It's an essential part of any creative lifeblood." On 6 May 2020, the Cult announced on their Twitter page that they had signed to Black Hill Records.

On 15 August 2020, Duffy announced on his Twitter that the band were recording their eleventh studio album with producer Tom Dalgety at Rockfield Studios, where the Cult had recorded their debut studio album Dreamtime 36 years earlier. Progress was slow for nearly two years, hampered by the COVID-19 pandemic, and the album being recorded remotely, with the half of the band tracking it at Rockfield Studios and Astbury in the United States. In May 2022, Duffy told The Yorkshire Post that the "main bulk" of the album was finished and mastered. On 7 July 2022 the band announced Under the Midnight Sun as the title of their album, released on 7 October, and "Give Me Mercy" was released its first single.

Prior to the release of the album, the Cult embarked on a co-headlining six-date UK tour with Alice Cooper and Creeper in May and June 2022, and in the following month, they toured in North America with Black Rebel Motorcycle Club and Zola Jesus.

=== Reunion of Death Cult, hiatus from touring and potential twelfth studio album (2023–present) ===
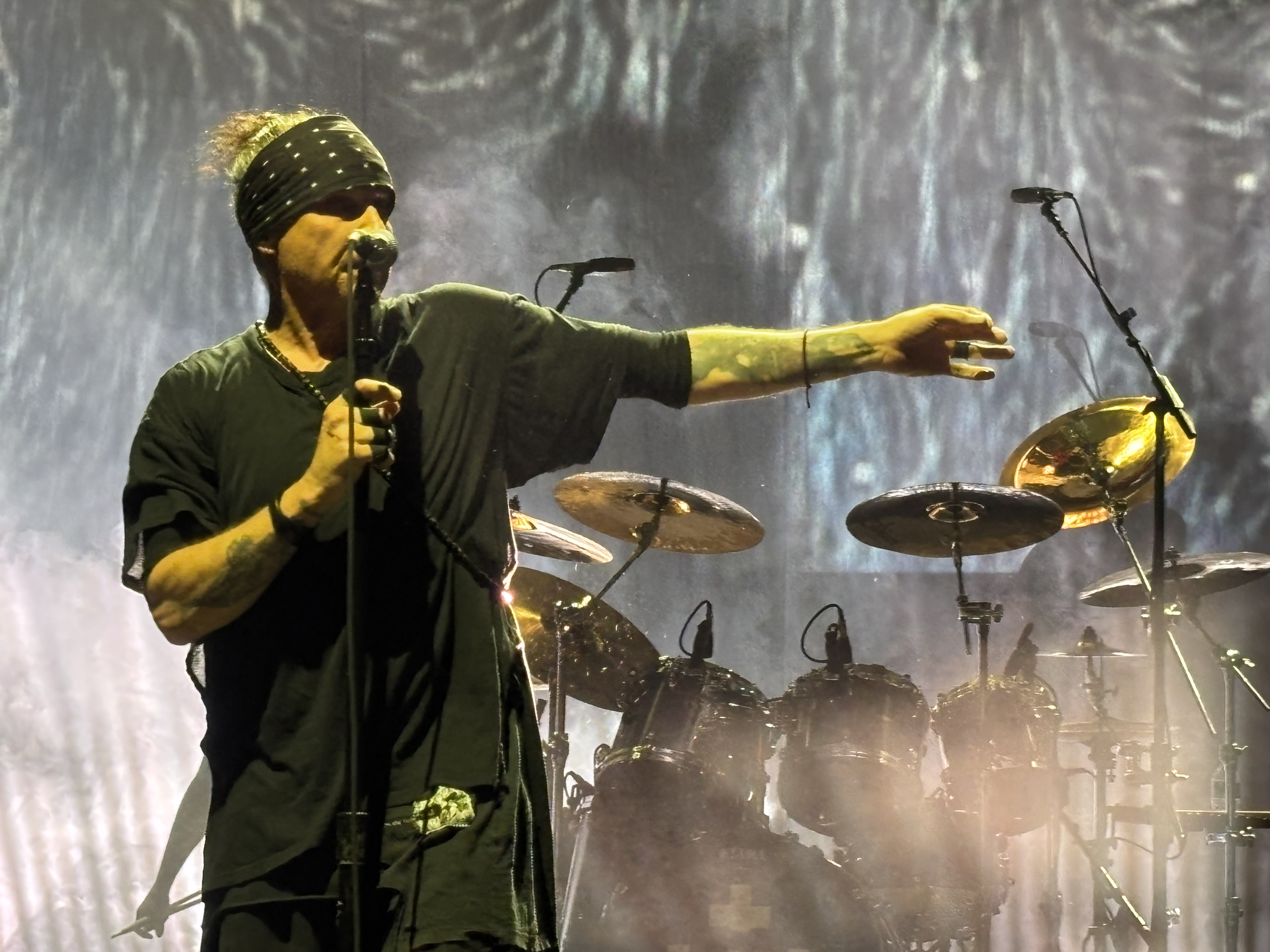
Frontman Ian Astbury performing at the Beacon Theatre in New York City with the Cult on October 14, 2025.

On 14 August 2023, Astbury and Duffy announced a twelve-date tour of the UK, along with a single US date in Los Angeles, under the title "Death Cult 8323". Whilst concentrating on the Death Cult material, the shows also covered Southern Death Cult and the Cult's first two albums, Dreamtime and Love.

On 5 October 2023, The Spokesman-Review reported that the Cult were working on new material for a possible 2024 release. Astbury confirmed in February 2025 that new music from the band was in the works, but expressed uncertainty about releasing another studio album as the Cult: "Albums are dead, pretty much albums are finished. Albums are dead, the concept of making an album, I like the idea of making — if you have a piece of music and it's fresh, put it out."

On 15 July 2025, the band announced a North American tour featuring a set performing music from Death Cult in addition to the Cult.

On 23 October 2025, the Cult announced a hiatus from touring for an "undetermined amount of time" with a focus on "writing, recording new music and exploring other projects that shall be revealed over time."

On 29 September 2026, the Cult announced their return to touring and that they would be opening for A Perfect Circle on their 2027 US tour.

On 7 November 2026, John Tempesta announced that he had left the Cult after 20 years as their drummer.

== Artistry ==
=== Influences ===
The Cult cite their influences as "everything from the Doors to Led Zeppelin." On the band's early influences, Astbury recalled, "We literally went from the front of our record collections to the back. And then along the way we were drawn in by the likes of Public Image Ltd, Joy Division and Siouxsie and the Banshees. You might not hear it in the music but it's there." They also cite Bauhaus among many other post-punk influences. Duffy also praised Johnny Thunders and the Heartbreakers for a major performance he attended in 1977 and Siouxsie and the Banshees who "always had great guitar players with killer riffs." Duffy also hailed AC/DC for "the power of a good three chord riff", Pete Townshend of the Who "in terms of commitment to stage performing" and Brian May of Queen for using "'echoplex' tape delays to orchestrate his own solo".

=== Musical style ===
AllMusic writer Stephen Thomas Erlewine states that The Cult "formed as a goth band" and later became "a stadium-filling hard rock act led by the shamanistic Ian Astbury." American vocal coach Ken Tamplin added that "the band's early sound was heavily influenced by punk rock and post-punk, with their debut album, Dreamtime, released in 1984", on his website. Astbury said, "our music is just melodies and guitars. We're like Big Country and U2, only better!" in 1985.

The songs were too long and just felt bloated and self-indulgent. We'd gone back into the studio too soon, as the label just wanted us to keep laying golden eggs. In reality, we should have kept rehearsing and gone through a pre-production process. We knew something was not right, but didn't quite know what it was.

— Billy Duffy reflecting on the recording of Peace during a Sabotage Times interview.

The Cult's music evolved over the years, blending hard rock, psychedelia and guitar solos with gothic rock on their second album, Love (1985). The band continued this style on their next recordings, but was dissatisfied with the results of the sessions. The tentatively entitled Peace was scrapped in favour of the Rick Rubin-produced Electric (1987), which was the Cult's first foray into an AC/DC-influenced hard rock and heavy metal sound. While the band continued in this vein with their next album Sonic Temple (1989), the first of many Cult albums to be produced by Bob Rock, they leaned more heavily on influences from various genres such as blues, progressive and arena rock. The band were seen as a middle ground between alternative rock and glam metal in the late 1980s, though Astbury rejected the latter label.

The Cult incorporated tribal rhythms on their fifth album, Ceremony (1991), and experimented with grunge and noise rock influences on their self-titled sixth album (1994), with its use of distortion and feedback. The band's seventh, and first post-reunion, album Beyond Good and Evil (2001) marked a return to the hard rock direction of Electric and Sonic Temple; both that album and its predecessor also saw the Cult reunite with Sonic Temple producer Bob Rock. Still, the band are mostly seen as alternative rock, heavy metal, arena rock and as part of the first wave of alternative metal. The band's latest two albums, Hidden City (2016) and Under the Midnight Sun (2022), saw them return to their gothic roots, while retaining a hard rock style.

== Members ==
Current members

- Ian Astbury – lead vocals, percussion (1983–1995, 1999–2002, 2006–present)
- Billy Duffy – guitars (1983–1995, 1999–2002, 2006–present)
- Charlie Jones – bass, backing vocals (2020–present)

== Discography ==
Studio albums

- Dreamtime (1984)
- Love (1985)
- Electric (1987)
- Sonic Temple (1989)
- Ceremony (1991)
- The Cult (1994)
- Beyond Good and Evil (2001)
- Born into This (2007)
- Choice of Weapon (2012)
- Hidden City (2016)
- Under the Midnight Sun (2022)
