= She Sells Sanctuary =

1985 single by the Cult

Single by the Cult

from the album Love
- B-side: "No. 13"; "The Snake"
- Released: 13 May 1985
- Genre: Gothic rock; post-punk; alternative rock
- Length: 4:23; 6:58 (long version)
- Label: Beggars Banquet
- Songwriters: Ian Astbury; Billy Duffy
- Producer: Steve Brown

The Cult singles chronology
"Ressurection Joe" (1984)	"She Sells Sanctuary" (1985)	"Rain" (1985)

Official audio
- "She Sells Sanctuary" on YouTube

1993 remix cover
- "Sanctuary MCMXCIII"

Audio sample
- An excerpt from "She Sells Sanctuary".: file; help

"She Sells Sanctuary" is a song by the English rock band the Cult. It is from their second studio album, Love (1985), and was released as a single on 13 May 1985, peaking at No. 15 on the UK singles chart in July of the same year. In March 2023, the British Phonographic Industry (BPI) awarded the song a platinum certification for sales and streams of over 600,000. In January 1993, the song was re-released as "Sanctuary MCMXCIII" and experienced chart success once more, matching its original peak on the UK singles chart and entering the top 10 in New Zealand. The song is certified double platinum in Canada and platinum in New Zealand and the United Kingdom.

== Background and composition ==
One of the earlier songs written for what would become the Love album, "She Sells Sanctuary" was first performed during the Dreamtime tour in the late 1984 and would become the last song to be recorded with the Cult's longtime drummer, Nigel Preston, who was fired from the band shortly after its release. According to Cult guitarist Billy Duffy, the iconic introduction effects were the result of all the guitar effects pedals being on at the same time. The recording was edited to include the introduction with the effects, whereas earlier versions started the song more abruptly. Duffy says he found a violin bow lying around the studio and started playing the guitar with it "like Jimmy Page" of Led Zeppelin to amuse lead vocalist Ian Astbury, hit every effects pedal he had "to make it sound weirder", and then played the middle section of the song. "And we decided to start the song with that mystical sound. If I hadn't found that violin bow laying around, we wouldn't have gone there," said Duffy.

== Release ==
After its release in 1985, the single reached number 36 during a six-week run on the US Billboard Dance/Disco Club Play chart in early 1986. The band has released various versions of the song. Aside from the original 7-inch single, three other versions had been released around the same time on 12-inch formats: "The Long Version", "The Howling Mix" and "Assault on Sanctuary".

On 18 January 1993, several more mixes were released on two different CD singles and a 12-inch single, titled "Sanctuary MCMXCIII". The "Sundance" remix was remixed by Butch Vig who had previously produced Nirvana's second studio album Nevermind (1991). The "Dog Star Rising" remix was remixed by Youth who produced the Cult's eighth studio album, Born into This (2007). In 2009, two more previously unreleased versions, a demo and the "Olympic Rough Mix" were included in a 4-disc box set of the omnibus edition of Love.

== Critical reception ==
John Leland at Spin described the song as "one of those inane pieces of pomp pop that—through no fault of the band's — transcends its formidable pretensions to become a whomping dance record. The drums drive the thing, but the crucial sound is guitar — lots of it. Electric, acoustic, distorted, echoey, all chasing a snappy riff. Dopey is dopey, but sometimes, with the right sound, you can get away with it."

In a retrospective review, Ned Raggett of AllMusic described Ian Astbury's voice as "strong and commanding". Raggett praised the song's energy and "a triumphant, driving lead melody that's jaw-dropping."

== Track listings ==
=== Original version ===
7-inch single

A. "She Sells Sanctuary"
B. "No. 13"

UK 12-inch single

A1. "She Sells Sanctuary" (long version)
B1. "The Snake"
B2. "No. 13"

=== "Sanctuary MCMXCIII" ===
UK CD1

1. "She Sells Sanctuary" (original) (mix by Steve Brown)
2. "She Sells Sanctuary" (Dog Star Rising) (remix by Youth)
3. "She Sells Sanctuary" (Phlegmatic) (remix by JG Thirlwell)
4. "She Sells Sanctuary" (Flusteresqueish) (remix by JG Thirlwell)

UK CD2

1. "She Sells Sanctuary" (Dog Star Radio) (remix by Youth)
2. "She Sells Sanctuary" (Sundance) (remix by Butch Vig)
3. "She Sells Sanctuary" (Slutnostic) (remix by JG Thirlwell)
4. "She Sells Sanctuary" (Lakeland live)

UK 12-inch single

A1. "She Sells Sanctuary" (Dog Star Rising) (remix by Youth)
A2. "She Sells Sanctuary" (original) (mix by Steve Brown)
B1. "She Sells Sanctuary" (Slutnostic) (remix by JG Thirlwell)
B2. "She Sells Sanctuary" (Sundance) (remix by Butch Vig)

Australian CD single

1. "She Sells Sanctuary" (original) (mix by Steve Brown)
2. "She Sells Sanctuary" (Sundance) (remix by Butch Vig)
3. "She Sells Sanctuary" (Phlegmatic) (remix by JG Thirlwell)
4. "She Sells Sanctuary" (Flusteresqueish) (remix by JG Thirlwell)

Australian cassette single

1. "She Sells Sanctuary" (Dog Star radio mix) (remix by Youth)
2. "She Sells Sanctuary" (original version) (mix by Steve Brown)

== Charts ==
=== Original version ===
Chart (1985–1986)	Peak position
Canada Top Singles (RPM)	11
Europe (European Hot 100 Singles)	45
Ireland (IRMA)	27
Netherlands (Single Top 100)	35
UK Singles (Official Charts)	15
US Dance Club Songs (Billboard)	36
US Dance Singles Sales (Billboard)	43

=== "Sanctuary MCMXCIII" ===
Chart (1993)	Peak position
Australia (ARIA)	51
Europe (Eurochart Hot 100)	57
Ireland (IRMA)	22
New Zealand (Recorded Music NZ)	9
UK Singles (Official Charts)	15

== Certifications ==
Region	Certification	Certified units/sales
Canada (Music Canada)	2× Platinum	160,000^{‡}
New Zealand (RMNZ)	Platinum	30,000^{‡}
United Kingdom (BPI)	Platinum	600,000^{‡}
^{‡} Sales+streaming figures based on certification alone.
