= Ray Mondo =

Sierra Leonean drummer

- Also known as: Ray; The Reverend
- Born: Raymond Taylor-Smith; Sierra Leone
- Origin: United Kingdom
- Genres: Post-punk; gothic rock
- Occupation: Drummer
- Years active: 1981–1984
- Formerly of: Ritual; Death Cult; Sex Gang Children

Raymond Taylor-Smith (born in Sierra Leone) was a drummer for several notable British post-punk and gothic rock groups during the early 1980s. He is best known by his stage name, Ray Mondo.

== Biography ==
Ray Mondo first appeared on the British music scene when he joined the Harrow-based post-punk group Ritual upon its formation in 1981. He drummed for the group for nearly two years, appearing on both of their records, the "Mind Disease" single and Kangaroo Court EP. During this period, he was going simply by "Ray".

In March 1983, Ritual dissolved. Mondo was recruited by Ian Astbury and Billy Duffy in April 1983 to drum for their newly formed group Death Cult. It was Mondo, now going by the moniker "Ray Mondo" and alternately "The Reverend", that suggested Jamie Stewart (his bandmate from Ritual) for the vacant bass guitarist slot (after Astbury and Duffy had auditioned some 30 hopefuls). Mondo drummed on the group's eponymous Death Cult EP and during their summer 1983 European and United Kingdom tour.

By September 1983, the group had decided to eject Mondo. Astbury's reasoning was documented in a 1983 interview:

"The thing with Ray is, he's so good at his style of drumming that he couldn't do the style that we needed for our songs. That wouldn't have been being true to himself. So I thought it would be better if he left and got involved in something where he could be his own man, as opposed to my man. We thought Ray was restricting our individuality. When you feel that what you're doing isn't getting across enough because of another member then they've got to go. I mean, ultimately I started this off, so I'm not willing to compromise to Ray's individuality. It was really fucking hard. We all really love Ray as a mate."

Mondo played his last gig with Death Cult on 19 September 1983 at the Brixton Ace in London. Shortly afterwards, he essentially "swapped" places with drummer Nigel Preston (who had previously worked with Duffy in Theatre of Hate). Preston was drumming for Sex Gang Children at the time. Duffy recruited Preston as the new drummer for Death Cult and Mondo filled the vacated drummer's position with Sex Gang Children in September 1983.

Mondo remained with Sex Gang Children until January 1984, when he was deported back to his native Sierra Leone. He now lives in L.A., California, US and works as an independent audio engineer .
