= Love (The Cult album) =

Studio album by the Cult
- Released: 18 October 1985
- Recorded: July – August 1985
- Studios: Jacobs (Farnham, England); Olympic (London, England)
- Genres: Gothic rock; post-punk; alternative rock; hard rock
- Length: 51:31
- Labels: Beggars Banquet; Sire
- Producer: Steve Brown

The Cult chronology
Dreamtime (1984)	Love (1985)	Electric (1987)

Singles from Love
- 1. "She Sells Sanctuary" Released: 17 May 1985; 2. "Rain" Released: 27 September 1985; 3. "Revolution" Released: 22 November 1985

Love is the second studio album by the English rock band the Cult, released on 18 October 1985 by Beggars Banquet Records. The album was the band's commercial breakthrough, reaching number four in the UK and staying on the chart for 22 weeks. It produced three Top 40 singles in the UK, "She Sells Sanctuary", "Rain", and "Revolution". It has been released in nearly 30 countries and sold an estimated 2.5 million copies. Love was recorded at Jacob's Studios in Farnham, Surrey, in July and August 1985.

== Background ==
Many European CD pressings, as well as Canadian and Australian pressings, include two bonus tracks: "Little Face" as track four, and "Judith" as track eleven. Various other foreign pressings have several other bonus tracks. For unknown reasons, the Korean vinyl and cassette tape editions omitted the songs "Big Neon Glitter" and "Revolution". Also inexplicably, in the Philippines a considerably shorter version of the song "Brother Wolf; Sister Moon" was used; it lasts only 5:18, omitting most of the guitar solos in the second half of the song.

In 2000, the album was remastered and reissued on CD, with only the ten original songs and different artwork. "Big Neon Glitter" and "Hollow Man" are alternately listed with and without the article "The" in their title, respectively.

In 2003, the record was issued on CD in Russia, Belarus and Lithuania, formerly being available only as a bootleg LP in the Soviet Union. These 2003 Eastern European releases came with the bonus tracks "Faith Healer" and "Edie (Ciao Baby)" (acoustic) as tracks 13 and 14, and the word acoustic is misspelled as "accoustic"; the pressings also use a different font for the lettering. There is also an Indonesian cassette tape version which rearranges the track listing, and includes "Dreamtime" and "Bad Medicine Waltz", from the previous Cult studio album, Dreamtime (1984).

To coincide with the band's Love Live Tour in August 2009, the band released two different editions of the album:

1. Version one is the "Expanded Edition", a 2-CD set consisting of the album on one disc as well as extended versions of album cuts, remixes and b-sides on the second disc. This set was released on 8 August 2009 in Varada and the US, and 21 September in Europe.
2. Version two is called the "Omnibus Edition" which features the first two discs from the "Expanded Edition" plus two more discs. Disc three features demos from the Love album presented for the first time, and disc four features a live concert recorded by the BBC at the Hammersmith Odeon in London on 31 October 1985.

Professional ratings
Review scores
Source	Rating
AllMusic	4/5 stars
BBC	(very favourable)
Kerrang!	4.5/5 stars
Metal Hammer	9/10 stars

== Track listing ==
=== Original 1985 release ===
All tracks are written by Ian Astbury and Billy Duffy.

No.	Title	Length
1.	"Nirvana"	5:24
2.	"Big Neon Glitter"	4:45
3.	"Love"	5:35
4.	"Brother Wolf, Sister Moon"	6:49
5.	"Rain"	3:57
6.	"Phoenix"	5:06
7.	"Hollow Man"	4:45
8.	"Revolution"	5:20
9.	"She Sells Sanctuary"	4:23
10.	"Black Angel"	5:22
Total length:		51:31

=== 2009 "Expanded edition" CD 2 track listing ===
1. "She Sells Sanctuary" (Long version) – 6:59
2. "No. 13" – 4:40
3. "The Snake" – 8:09
4. "(Here Comes the) Rain" – 6:19
5. "Little Face" – 4:54
6. "Revolution" (Full length remix) – 5:29
7. "Judith" – 5:29
8. "Sunrise" – 5:11
9. "All Souls Avenue" – 4:45
10. "She Sells Sanctuary" (Howling mix) – 8:26
11. "Assault on Sanctuary" – 7:31

=== Omnibus edition CD 3 and 4 track listings ===
==== CD 3: "The Demos" ====
1. "Brother Wolf, Sister Moon" – 7:54
2. "Hollow Man" – 5:48
3. "She Sells Sanctuary" – 5:21
4. "All Souls Avenue" – 4:56
5. "Little Face" – 5:45
6. "No. 13" – 6:23
7. "Big Neon Glitter" – 6:34
8. "Waltz" (Instrumental) – 4:36
9. "Nirvana" (Instrumental) – 6:04
10. "Revolution" (Instrumental) – 6:50
11. "She Sells Sanctuary" (Olympic mix) – 7:04

==== CD 4: Live at the Hammersmith Odeon, 31 October 1985 ====
1. "Love" – 5:54
2. "Nirvana" – 5:05
3. "Christians" – 4:33
4. "Hollow Man" – 5:01
5. "Big Neon Glitter" – 4:46
6. "Brother Wolf, Sister Moon" – 7:01
7. "Rain" – 5:12
8. "Dreamtime" – 3:10
9. "She Sells Sanctuary" – 5:35
10. "Go West" – 5:02
11. "Spiritwalker" – 4:35
12. "Horse Nation" – 3:17
13. "Phoenix" – 5:19

=== Bonus tracks/international releases ===
- "Little Face" (bonus track, track four in some territories)
- "Judith" (bonus track, track eleven in some territories)
- "Faith Healer" (bonus track, track thirteen in Eastern Europe and Asia)
- "Edie (Ciao Baby)" (acoustic version) (bonus track, track fourteen in Eastern Europe and Asia)
- Indonesian cassette tape versions:
1. Side A: "Love", "She Sells Sanctuary", "Rain", "Nirvana", "Revolution", "Black Angel"
2. Side B: "Phoenix", "The Hollow Man", "Big Neon Glitter", "Brother Wolf Sister Moon", "Dreamtime"*, "Bad Medicine Waltz"*. *From the studio album Dreamtime.

On these Indonesian pressings, the song "Brother Wolf Sister Moon" is incorrectly listed as "Brother Walf Sister Moon", and drummer Nigel Preston is listed as Nigel Reston.

- Saudi Arabian cassette tape versions includes "Spiritwalker", "Dreamtime", "Rider in the Snow" and "A Flower in the Desert" as bonus tracks, but it does not include "Judith" or "Little Face". An alternate Saudi Arabian version includes only nine of the original ten songs, omitting "Revolution" and comes with a different sleeve.

== 2009–2010 Love Live Tour ==
In 2009 and 2010, the Cult played the Love album in its entirety during an extended tour. The setlist typically was formatted as follows.

1. "Nirvana"
2. "Big Neon Glitter"
3. "Love"
4. "Brother Wolf, Sister Moon"
5. "Rain"
6. "Phoenix"
7. "Hollow Man"
8. "Revolution"
9. "She Sells Sanctuary"
10. "Black Angel"

Encore:

1. "Electric Ocean"
2. "Wild Flower"
3. "Illuminated" (later replaced with "Sun King")
4. "Rise"
5. "Fire Woman"
6. "Dirty Little Rockstar"
7. "Love Removal Machine"

On 10 October 2009, Jamie Stewart and Mark Brzezicki joined the band on stage, performing "The Phoenix" and "She Sells Sanctuary".

== Personnel ==
The Cult

- Ian Astbury – lead vocals
- Billy Duffy – guitars, backing vocals on "Hollow Man"
- Jamie Stewart – bass, keyboards and strings, backing vocals on "Hollow Man"
- Nigel Preston – drums on "She Sells Sanctuary", "No. 13" and "The Snake"

Additional personnel

- Mark Brzezicki – drums on all tracks except "She Sells Sanctuary", "No. 13" and "The Snake"
- Simon Kliney – Fairlight CMI
- The Soultanas (Mae McKenna, Lorenza Johnson, Jackie Challenor) – backing vocals on "Rain", "Revolution" and "Phoenix".

== Charts ==
Chart (1985–87)	Peak position
Canada Top Albums/CDs (RPM)	5
Dutch Albums (Album Top 100)	20
Finnish Albums (The Official Finnish Charts)	33
New Zealand Albums (RMNZ)	37
UK Albums (Official Charts)	4
US Billboard 200	87

Chart (2023)	Peak position
Scottish Albums (Official Charts)	12
UK Independent Albums (Official Charts)	5
UK Rock & Metal Albums (Official Charts)	1

== Certifications ==
Region	Certification	Certified units/sales
Canada (Music Canada)	2× Platinum	200,000^{^}
United Kingdom (BPI)	Gold	100,000^{^}
United States (RIAA)	Gold	500,000^{^}
^{^} Shipments figures based on certification alone.
