= Love Removal Machine =

1987 single by the Cult

Single by the Cult

from the album Electric
- Released: 16 February 1987
- Recorded: December 1986
- Genre: Hard rock; heavy metal
- Length: 4:17
- Label: Beggars Banquet
- Songwriters: Ian Astbury; Billy Duffy
- Producer: Rick Rubin

The Cult singles chronology
"Revolution" (1985)	"Love Removal Machine" (1987)	"Lil' Devil" (1987)

"Love Removal Machine" is a song recorded by the British rock band the Cult. It was the first single to be released from the group's 1987 album Electric. First recorded during a radio session, it had a different arrangement when it was recorded for the band's third album, Peace. When that album was scrapped, it was re-recorded for the replacement album, Electric. An extended remix was also created and released on a 12" single. The song's main riff has been compared to that of "Start Me Up" which was released by the Rolling Stones in 1981. "Love Removal Machine" was named the 74th best hard rock song of all time by VH1.

== Track listing ==
Double vinyl 7"

1. "Love Removal Machine"
2. "Wolf Child's Blues"
3. "Conquistador"
4. "Groove Co"

Vinyl 7"

1. "Love Removal Machine"
2. "Wolf Child's Blues"

Vinyl 12"

1. "Love Removal Machine" (extended version)
2. "Love Removal Machine"
3. "Wolf Child's Blues"
4. "Conquistador"
5. "Groove Co"

Cassette

1. "Love Removal Machine"
2. "Wolf Child's Blues"
3. "Conquistador"
4. "Groove Co"
5. "Love Removal Machine" (extended version)

== Charts ==
=== Weekly charts ===
Chart (1987)	Peak position
Australia (ARIA)	58
Canada Top Singles (RPM)	36
Netherlands (Dutch Top 40)	32
Netherlands (Single Top 100)	24
New Zealand (Recorded Music NZ)	25
UK Singles (Official Charts)	18
US Mainstream Rock (Billboard)	15

== Certifications ==
Region	Certification	Certified units/sales
Canada (Music Canada)	Gold	40,000^{‡}
^{‡} Sales+streaming figures based on certification alone.
