= Southern Death Cult =

British post-punk/gothic rock band

- Origin: Bradford, West Yorkshire, England
- Genres: Gothic rock; post-punk
- Years active: 1981–1983
- Labels: Situation Two; Beggars Banquet
- Spinoffs: The Cult
- Past members: Ian Astbury; David "Buzz" Burrows; Barry Jepson; Haq Nawaz "Aky" Qureshi

Southern Death Cult were a British post-punk and gothic rock band that formed in Bradford during the early 1980s. They are now primarily known for having given their lead vocalist and parts of the name to the multi-platinum hard rock band the Cult. Despite the similarities in the names, "Southern Death Cult" were distinct from "Death Cult" and "the Cult".

== History ==
The musical history of Southern Death Cult can be charted as far back as early 1979 in Bradford, Yorkshire with the band Violation. Bassist Barry Jepson and drummer Haq Nawaz "Aki" Qureshi had formed the band with a guitarist Mick Iles, nickname Gary Numan.The band rehearsed for about 7 months before playing their first show. The band played about 20 shows in total over the 18 months that they were together and recorded a set of thirteen demos on a 4 track on 3 and 4 January 1981 at Bradford Community Studio.

Southern Death Cult formed in 1981, with a lineup of vocalist Ian Astbury, guitarist David "Buzz" Burrows, Jepson, and Aky.

The group's name derived from an old term for the Southeastern Ceremonial Complex, a mound-building Native American culture (and the band were also known for their use of Native American imagery), but it also served as a critique of the imbalance of power in the English North-South divide.

The first Southern Death Cult show took place on 29 October 1981 at the Queen's Hall in Bradford. Southern Death Cult toured heavily in the UK to promote the single, including slots opening for Theatre of Hate, Bauhaus and The Pit at Exeter University in December at the end of 1982, but Astbury disbanded the group after a show in Manchester on 26 February 1983.

The band's sole album, The Southern Death Cult, was posthumously issued by Beggars Banquet in 1983, compiling all three tracks from the single, live performances and BBC Radio 1 sessions.

== Later projects ==
Astbury and guitarist Billy Duffy (of the Nosebleeds and Theatre of Hate) came together in April 1983 to form an act with a similar name, first called Death Cult and then, after releasing an eponymous four-song EP and a single later in 1983, renamed the Cult.

The other three ex-members of Southern Death Cult, augmented by vocalist Paul "Bee" Hampshire, formed Getting the Fear, who released one single, "Last Salute", on RCA Records before splitting up in 1985.

Jepson and Hampshire went on to form Into a Circle, releasing the Assassins album in 1988. Jepson later worked as a concert promoter and currently teaches live sound and tour management at the British and Irish Modern Music Institute.

Burrows and Qureshi formed a band called Joy.

Qureshi then went on to form the political Islamic hip-hop group Fun-Da-Mental and created the label Nation Records.

== Discography ==
=== Singles ===
- "Moya/Fatman" a.k.a. The Southern Death Cult 7"/12" (1982, Situation 2)

=== Compilation albums ===
- The Southern Death Cult (1983, Beggars Banquet Records)
