= Situation Two =

British independent record label

- Parent company: Beggars Banquet Records
- Founded: 1981
- Founder: Peter Kent
- Defunct: 1992
- Genre: Alternative rock, indie rock, garage rock
- Country of origin: United Kingdom
- Location: London

Situation Two (a.k.a. Situation 2) was a British independent record label founded in 1981 by Peter Kent as an offshoot of the Beggars Banquet label. The name is a reference to Bauhaus's old management company, Situation 1.

At the time, Beggars Banquet releases were often distributed by WEA; to appeal to the indie audience and to get releases into the UK Indie Chart, Situation Two, as well as its sister label 4AD (which Kent had co-founded a year earlier with Ivo Watts-Russell, but soon left), were created.

During its 11-year history, Situation Two came to prominence as the home for a varied number of indie favourites. These included Madchester band the Charlatans, early incarnations of the Cult, Bauhaus side project Tones on Tail, the solo work of former Bauhaus member David J, and cult bands like the Associates, Fields of the Nephilim, Thee Hypnotics, Gene Loves Jezebel, Play Dead, Red Lorry Yellow Lorry and Buffalo Tom.

When Situation Two was dissolved in 1992, many of the roster's releases were then issued on the parent Beggars Banquet label, and several were later included on the 1999 Beggars compilation album Pspyched!.

== Discography ==
=== Albums ===
1981

- Biting Tongues - Don't Heal (SITU 1)
- Associates - Fourth Drawer Down (SITU 2)
- New Asia - Gates (SITU 3)

1982

- Singers and Players - Revenge of the Underdog (SITU 4)
- The Last Man in Europe Corporation - Songs from the Ark (SITU 5)
- Lydia Lunch - 13.13 (SITU 6)

1983

- Gene Loves Jezebel - Promise (SITU 7)
- David J - Etiquette of Violence (SITU 8)

1984

- The Eternal Triangle - Touch and Let Go (SITU 9)
- Nyam Nyam - Hope of Heaven (SITU 10)
- Various artists - A New Optimism (SITU 11)

1985

- Tones on Tail - Tones on Tail (SITU 12)
- The Fall - Hip Priests and Kamerads (SITU 13)
- Gene Loves Jezebel - Immigrant (SITU 14)
- The Bolshoi - Giants (SITUM 15)
- Hank Wangford Band - Rodeo Radio (SITU 16)
- Various artists - Gunfire and Pianos (SITU 17) (in association with ZigZag magazine)

1987

- Fields of the Nephilim - Dawnrazor (SITUM 18)
- The Folk Devils - Goodnight Irony (SITUP 19)

1988

- Red Lorry Yellow Lorry - Nothing Wrong (SITU 20)
- King Blank - The Real Dirt (SITU 21)
- Fields of the Nephilim - The Nephilim (SITU 22)

1989

- The Fuzztones - In Heat (SITU 23)
- Ian Lowery Group - King Blank to... (SITU 24)
- Red Lorry Yellow Lorry - Blow (SITU 25)
- Thee Hypnotics - Live'r than God (SITUM 26)

1990

- Loop - A Gilded Eternity (SITU 27)
- Thee Hypnotics - Come Down Heavy (SITU 28)
- The Darkside - All That Noise (SITU 29)
- The Charlatans - Some Friendly (SITU 30)
- Buffalo Tom - Birdbrain (SITU 31)

1991

- Carnival Art - Thrumdrone (SITU 32)
- The Dylans - The Dylans (SITU 33)
- Thee Hypnotics - Soul, Glitter and Sin (SITU 35)

1992

- The Darkside - Melomania (SITU 34)
- Buffalo Tom - Let Me Come Over (SITU 36)
- The Charlatans - Between 10th and 11th (SITU 37)
- Terminal Power Company - Run Silent, Run Deep (SITU 38)
- Main - Hydra - Calm (SITL 39 CD)
- The Hair and Skin Trading Company - Jo in Nine G Hell (SITU 40)

=== Singles and EPs ===
1981

- Associates - "Tell Me Easter's on Friday" (SIT 1)
- New Asia - "Central Proposition" (SIT 2)
- Drowning Craze - "Storage Case" (SIT 3)
- Associates - "Q Quarters" (SIT 4)
- Divine - "Born to Be Cheap" (SIT 5)
- Home Service - "Only Men Fall in Love" (SIT 6)
- Associates - "Kitchen Persons" (SIT 7)
- Multivizion - "Work to Live Don't Live to Work" (SIT 8)
- London Underground - "Train of Thought" (SIT 9)
- Associates - "Message Oblique Speech" (SIT 10)
- Associates - "White Car in Germany" (SIT 11)
- John Marlon - "Sister Soul" (SIT 12)
- Drowning Craze - "Trance" (SIT 13)
- The Blackouts - "Exchange of Goods" (SIT 14)
- Orbidoig - "Nocturnal Operation" (SIT 15)

1982

- Drowning Craze - "Heat" (SIT 16)
- Ministry - "Cold Life" (SIT 17)
- Gene Loves Jezebel - "Shaving My Neck" (SIT 18)
- Southern Death Cult - "Moya" (SIT 19)

1983

- Gene Loves Jezebel - "Screaming (For Emmalene)" (SIT 20)
- Tones on Tail - "Burning Skies" (SIT 21)
- Icicle Works - "Birds Fly (Whisper to a Scream)" (SIT 22)
- Death Cult - Death Cult EP (SIT 23)
- Gene Loves Jezebel - "Bruises" (SIT 24)
- The Sinister Ducks - "March of the Sinister Ducks" (SIT 25)
- David J - "Joe Orton's Wedding" (SIT 26)
- Under Two Flags - "False History" (SIT 27)
- Play Dead - "Shine" (SIT 28)
- Death Cult - "Gods Zoo" (SIT 29)

1984

- The Eternal Triangle - "Only in the Night" (SIT 30)
- Gene Loves Jezebel - "Influenza (Relapse)" (SIT 31)
- Under Two Flags - "Masks" (SIT 32)
- The Cult - "Spiritwalker" (SIT 33)
- The Eternal Triangle - "Nothing But a Friend" (SIT 34)
- Gene Loves Jezebel - "Shame" (SIT 35)

1985

- Gene Loves Jezebel - "Cow" (SIT 36)
- Nyam Nyam - "The Architect" (SIT 37)
- The Bolshoi - "Sob Story" (SIT 38)
- Lulu Kiss Me Dead - "The Ultimate Solution" (SIT 39)
- The Bolshoi - "Happy Boy" (SIT 40)
- Gene Loves Jezebel - "Desire" (SIT 41)
- Naffi-Locksman - "We Are Willing" (DOVE 2 - Ark/Situation Two)
- It's Immaterial - Fish Waltz EP (DOVE 3 - Ark/Situation Two)

1986

- Fields of the Nephilim - "Power" (SIT 42)
- Multicoloured Shades - "Teen Sex Transfusion" (SIT 43)
- The Go-Betweens - "The Able Label Singles" (SIT 44T) (12" release only)
- Icicle Works - "Up Here in the North of England" (SIT 45T) (12" release only)

1987

- Fields of the Nephilim - "Preacher Man" (SIT 46)
- The Folk Devils - "The Best Protection" (SIT 47)
- Fields of the Nephilim - "Blue Water (Electrostatic)" (SIT 48)
- Red Lorry Yellow Lorry - "Open Up" (SIT 49)

1988

- Red Lorry Yellow Lorry - "Nothing Wrong" (SIT 50)
- King Blank - "Mouth Off" (SIT 51)
- Fields of the Nephilim - "Moonchild (First Seal)" (SIT 52)
- King Blank - "Blind Box" (SIT 53)
- Red Lorry Yellow Lorry - "Only Dreaming (Wide Awake)" (SIT 54)
- King Blank - "Uptight" (SIT 55)
- Death Cult - Death Cult EP (CD reissue) (SIT 2329)

1989

- Thee Hypnotics - "Justice in Freedom" (SIT 56)
- Fields of the Nephilim - "Psychonaut" (SIT 57)
- The Fuzztones - "Hurt on Hold" (SIT 58)
- The Ian Lowery Group - "Need" (SIT 59)
- Red Lorry Yellow Lorry - "Temptation" (SIT 60)
- The Fuzztones - "Nine Months Later" (SIT 61)
- Thee Hypnotics - "Soul Trader" (SIT 62)
- Goat - "Can't Get By" (SIT 63)
- Loop - "Arc-Lite (Sonar)" (SIT 64)

1990

- God - "Breach Birth" (SIT 65)
- The Darkside - "High Rise Love" (SIT 66)
- Thee Hypnotics - "Half Man Half Boy" (SIT 67)
- Passion Flower Hotel - "Singing in Circles" (SIT 68)
- The Fuzztones - "Action Speaks Louder than Words" (SIT 69)
- The Charlatans - "The Only One I Know" (SIT 70)
- Buffalo Tom - "Birdbrain" (SIT 71)
- The Darkside - "Waiting for the Angels" (SIT 72)
- Thee Hypnotics - "Floatin' in My Hoodoo Dream" (SIT 73)
- The Charlatans - "Then" (SIT 74)

1991

- The Dylans - "Godlike" (SIT 75)
- The Charlatans - "Over Rising" (SIT 76)
- Buffalo Tom - "Fortune Teller" (SIT 77)
- The Dylans - "Lemon Afternoon" (SIT 78)
- Carnival Art - "Blue Food & Black Sparks" (SIT 79)
- Terminal Power Company - "Wired" (SIT 80)
- The Dylans - "Planet Love" (SIT 81)
- Thee Hypnotics - "Shakedown" (SIT 82)
- Main - "Hydra - Flametracer" (SIT 83)
- The Charlatans - "Me in Time" (SIT 84)
- Carnival Art - "Wrestling Swamis" (SIT 85)

1992

- Buffalo Tom - "Velvet Roof" (SIT 86)
- The Hair and Skin Trading Company - "Ground Zero" (SIT 87)
- The Charlatans - "Weirdo" (SIT 88)
- Main - "Calm - There Is Only Light" (SIT 89)
- The Dylans - "Mary Quant in Blue" (SIT 90)
- The Spectrum Zero - "(Will It Hurt) If I Touch the Sun" (SIT 91)
- Terminal Power Company - "The Hunger, The Heat" (SIT 92)
- Carnival Art - "Ray's Jesus" (SIT 93)
- Thee Hypnotics - "Coast to Coast" (SIT 94)
- The Darkside - Mayhem to Meditate EP (SIT 95)
- Buffalo Tom - "Taillights Fade" (SIT 96)
- The Charlatans - "Tremolo Song" (SIT 97)
- Terminal Power Company - "Salvation" (SIT 98)

== See also ==
- List of record labels
