= Nigel Preston =

English drummer

Background information
- Born: 4 April 1963; Birmingham, England, United Kingdom
- Died: 1 April 1992 (aged 28)
- Genres: Punk rock; gothic rock
- Instrument: Drums
- Years active: 1980–1992

Nigel Preston (4 April 1963, Birmingham, England – 1 April 1992) was an English drummer. He was a founding member of the Cult. He also played and recorded with Theatre of Hate, Sex Gang Children, the Baby Snakes, the Gun Club and DeLuca.

He appeared on Top of the Pops for the first time with Theatre of Hate in 1982, playing their Top 40 single "Do You Believe in the West World".

He played on Sex Gang's 1983 single "Mauritia Mayer", then switched places with Death Cult's drummer Ray Mondo that September.

His biggest hit was "She Sells Sanctuary" by the Cult from their Love album. Recorded in March 1985, the song was released as their fourth single and hit No. 15 in the UK Singles Chart. It re-entered the charts at No. 56 in September 1986, spending 14 consecutive weeks on the charts. The song was later voted No. 18 in VH1's Indie 100. Preston refused to accept being put on wages after the song became a hit, and his bandmates believed him to be unreliable due to his use of drugs; these matters led to his firing from the band in June 1985.

After the Cult, Preston worked with Nile Rodgers in New York. He also played in the band DeLuca with Albie DeLuca (Gene Loves Jezebel) and Gary McDowell (Modern English).

In 1990, he joined Irish rock band the Baby Snakes, but soon afterward was sent to prison for armed robbery. After his release, he also performed with the Gun Club.

Preston died of a drug overdose on 1 April 1992, at age 28.

== Notes ==
- Filming the ‘She Sells Sanctuary’ video at Billy Duffy.com
