= Goth subculture =

Contemporary musical subculture

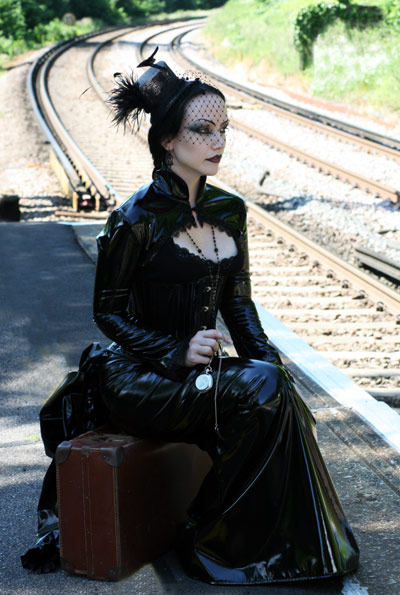
A woman dressed in goth style in June 2008

Goth is a music-based subculture that emerged from nightclubs such as the F Club and Batcave in the United Kingdom during the early 1980s, as well as gothic rock, a genre that evolved from British post-punk. The goth subculture is mainly centered around fashion, music festivals, clubs, and organized meetings.

Styles of dress within the subculture draw on glam rock, punk, new wave, new romantics and from the fashion of earlier periods such as the Victorian, Edwardian, and Belle Époque eras. The style most often includes dark (usually solid black) attire, dark makeup, and black hair. The subculture also drew inspiration from literary and cinematic gothic traditions, including German Expressionism and classic horror films (from Universal Monsters to Hammer horror), with a flair for theatricality and camp.

In the 1990s and 2000s, the goth subculture entered mainstream awareness, with its visual style and fashion influencing various aesthetic variants such as cybergoth and mall goth, while facing public moral panic, with media often linking it to deviance and self-harm. The subculture further developed on early social networking sites such as MySpace and Pure Volume. During the 2010s and 2020s, goth fashion internet aesthetics such as Health Goth and Whimsigoth emerged.

== History ==
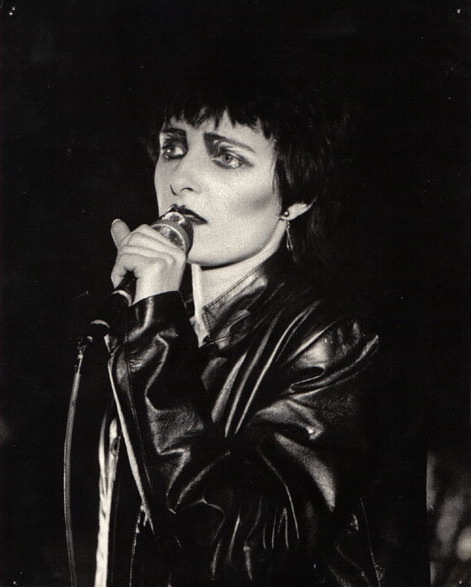
Siouxsie Sioux of Siouxsie and the Banshees in 1980

During the late 1970s, the gothic rock genre emerged from several British post-punk bands such as Siouxsie and the Banshees, Joy Division, Bauhaus and the Cure. However, it was not until the early 1980s that gothic rock became associated with a specific youth subculture.

In February 1981, Sounds writer Steve Keaton published an article on "punk gothique", entitled "The Face of Punk Gothique", a term coined by UK Decay frontman Steve Abbott to describe their music. In the article, Keaton stated, "Could this be the coming of Punk Gothique? With Bauhaus flying in on similar wings could it be the next big thing?" Writer Cathi Unsworth believes that Abbott was the first to ascribe the term to the music and the goth subculture with which it would come to be associated, citing an interview in May 1981 where he once again used the term "punk gothique".

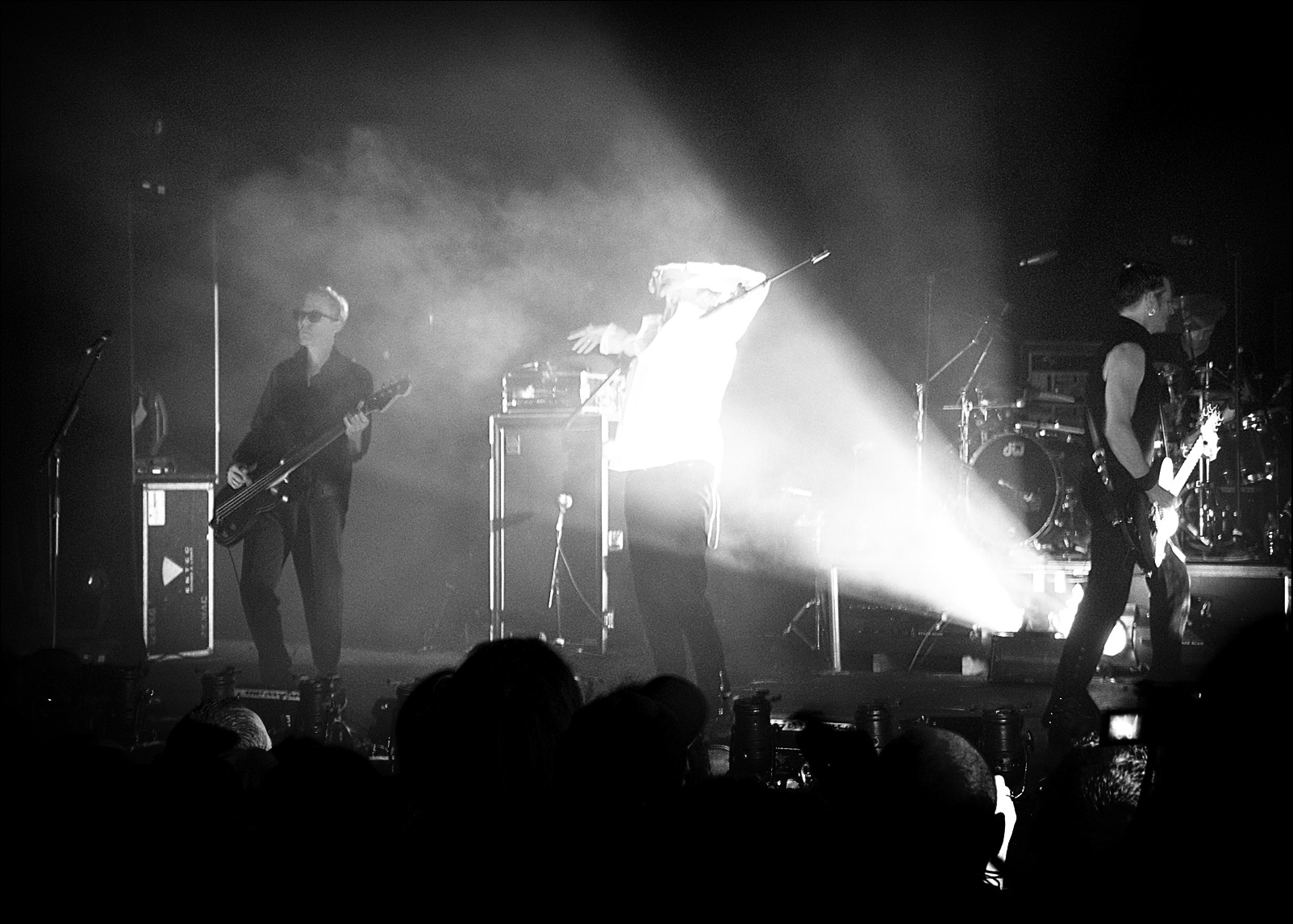
Bauhaus—Live in concert, 3 February 2006

In Leeds, the F Club became instrumental to the development of the goth subculture in the early 1980s, though had originally opened in 1977 as a punk club. By July 1982, the opening of the Batcave in London's Soho provided a prominent meeting point for the emerging scene, which was briefly labelled "positive punk" by the NME in a special issue with a front cover in February 1983. The scene and subculture was centered around the Batcave, and spearheaded by artists such as Alien Sex Fiend, Specimen, the Mob, UK Decay, Sex Gang Children, Rubella Ballet, and Southern Death Cult. On June 14, 1983, BBC radio DJ John Peel noted the NME had dropped the term "positive punk" and had now opted for "goth" to describe the scene and subculture.

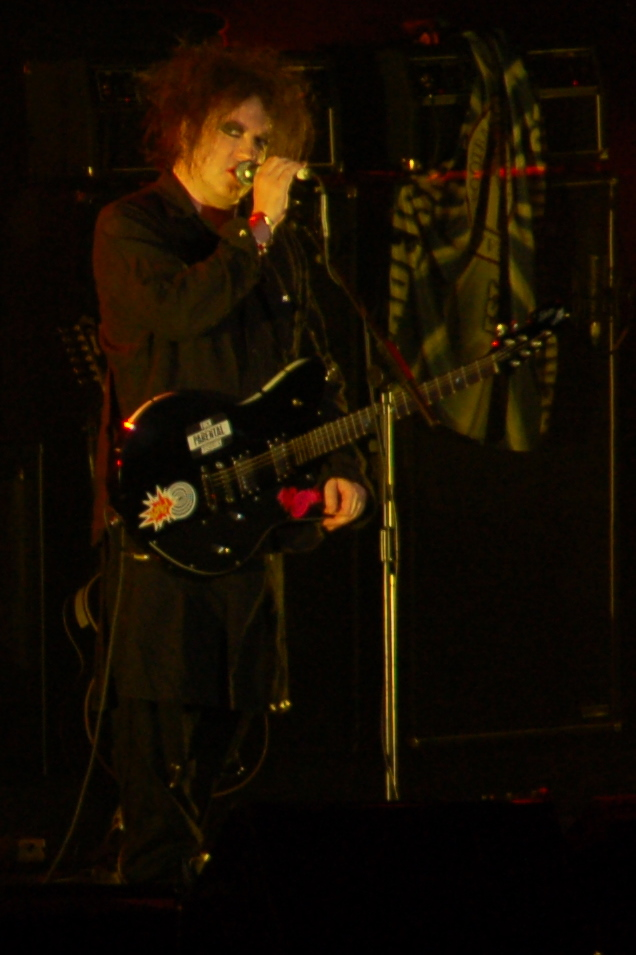
Lead singer and guitarist Robert Smith of the Cure

Some of the bands that defined and embraced the gothic rock genre included Bauhaus, the Cure, the Birthday Party, UK Decay, Virgin Prunes, Killing Joke, and the Damned. In the United States, deathrock developed in California during the late 1970s and early 1980s as a distinct branch of American punk rock, with acts such as Christian Death, Kommunity FK and 45 Grave at the forefront.

By the mid-1980s, bands began proliferating and became increasingly popular, including the Sisters of Mercy, the Mission, Alien Sex Fiend, the March Violets, Xmal Deutschland, the Membranes, and Fields of the Nephilim. Record labels like Factory, 4AD and Beggars Banquet released much of this music in Europe, and through a vibrant import music market in the US, the subculture grew, especially in New York and Los Angeles, California, where many nightclubs featured "gothic/industrial" nights and bands like Black Tape for a Blue Girl, Theatre of Ice, Human Drama and The Wake became key figures for the genre to expand on an nationwide level.

The 1990s saw further growth for some 1980s bands and the emergence of many new acts, as well as new goth-centric U.S. record labels such as Cleopatra Records, among others. According to Dave Simpson of The Guardian, "[I]n the 90s, goths all but disappeared as dance music became the dominant youth cult". As a result, the goth movement went underground and fractured into cyber goth, shock rock, industrial metal, gothic metal, and Medieval folk metal. Marilyn Manson was seen as a "goth-shock icon" by Spin.

== Art, historical and cultural influences ==
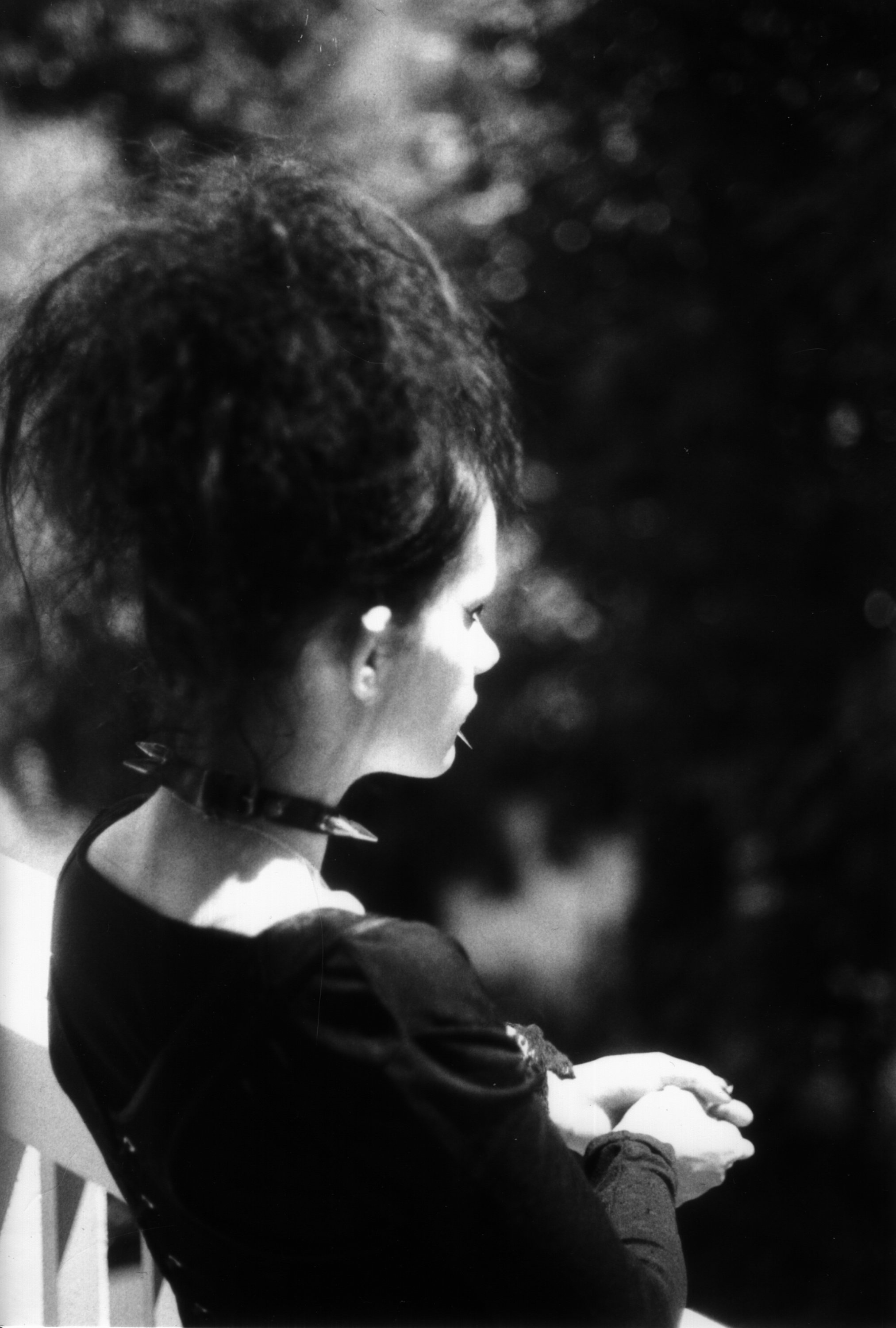
A woman dressed in goth style in the 1980s

The Goth subculture of the 1980s drew inspiration from a variety of sources. Some of them were modern or contemporary, others were centuries-old or ancient. Michael Bibby and Lauren M. E. Goodlad liken the subculture to a bricolage. Among the music-subcultures that influenced it were punk, new wave, and glam. But it also drew inspiration from B-movies, Gothic literature, horror films, vampire cults and traditional mythology. Among the mythologies that proved influential in Goth were Celtic mythology, Christian mythology, Egyptian mythology, and various traditions of Paganism.

=== 18th and 19th centuries' literary influences ===
The figures that the movement counted among its historic canon of ancestors were equally diverse. They included the Pre-Raphaelite Brotherhood, Friedrich Nietzsche (1844‒1900), Comte de Lautréamont (1846‒1870), Salvador Dalí (1904‒1989) and Jean-Paul Sartre (1905‒1980). Writers that have had a significant influence on the movement also represent a diverse canon. They include Ann Radcliffe (1764‒1823), John William Polidori (1795‒1821), Edgar Allan Poe (1809‒1849), Sheridan Le Fanu (1814–1873), Bram Stoker (1847‒1912), Oscar Wilde (1854‒1900), H. P. Lovecraft (1890‒1937), Anne Rice (1941‒2021), William Gibson (1948‒), Ian McEwan (1948‒), Storm Constantine (1956‒2021), and Poppy Z. Brite (1967‒).

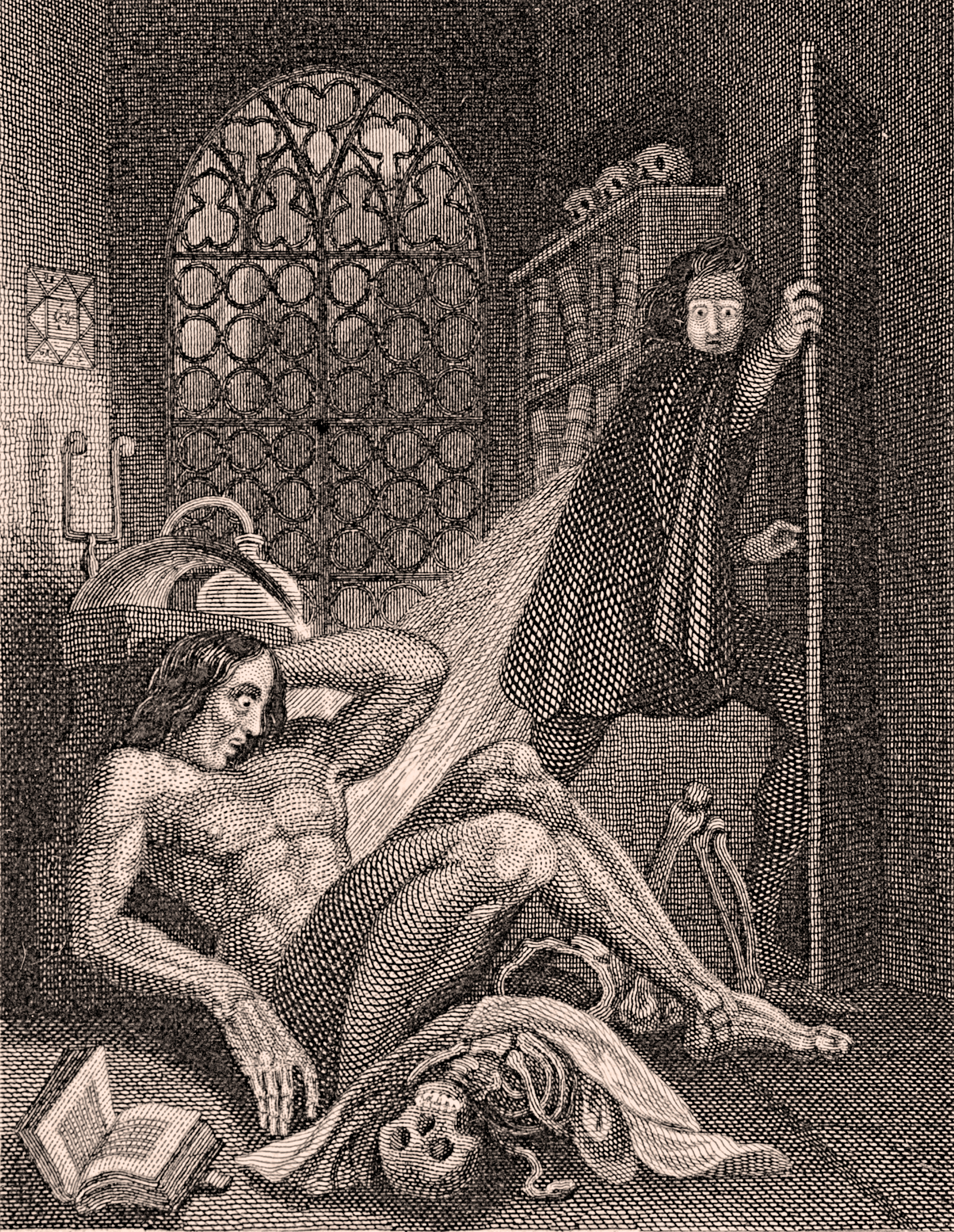
Mary Shelley's Frankenstein; or, The Modern Prometheus (1818) has come to define Gothic fiction in the Romantic period. Frontispiece to 1831 edition shown.

Gothic literature is a genre of fiction that combines romance and dark elements to produce mystery, suspense, terror, horror and the supernatural. According to David H. Richter, settings were framed to take place at "...ruinous castles, gloomy churchyards, claustrophobic monasteries, and lonely mountain roads". Typical characters consisted of the cruel parent, sinister priest, courageous victor, and the helpless heroine, along with supernatural figures such as demons, vampires, ghosts, and monsters. Often, the plot focused on characters ill-fated, internally conflicted, and innocently victimized by harassing malicious figures. In addition to the dismal plot focuses, the literary tradition of the gothic was to also focus on individual characters that were gradually going insane.

English author Horace Walpole, with his 1764 novel The Castle of Otranto is one of the first writers who explored this genre. The American Revolutionary War-era "American Gothic" story of the Headless Horseman, immortalized in "The Legend of Sleepy Hollow" (published in 1820) by Washington Irving, marked the arrival in the New World of dark, romantic storytelling. The tale was composed by Irving while he was living in England, and was based on popular tales told by colonial Dutch settlers of the Hudson Valley, New York. The story would be adapted to film in 1922, in 1949 as the animated The Adventures of Ichabod and Mr. Toad, and again in 1999.

Throughout the evolution of the goth subculture, classic Romantic, Gothic and horror literature has played a significant role. E. T. A. Hoffmann, Edgar Allan Poe, Charles Baudelaire, H. P. Lovecraft, and other tragic and Romantic writers have become as emblematic of the subculture as the use of dark eyeliner or dressing in black. Baudelaire, in fact, in his preface to Les Fleurs du mal (Flowers of Evil) penned lines that could serve as a sort of goth malediction:

C'est l'Ennui! —l'œil chargé d'un pleur involontaire,
Il rêve d'échafauds en fumant son houka.
Tu le connais, lecteur, ce monstre délicat,
—Hypocrite lecteur,—mon semblable,—mon frère!

It is Boredom!—an eye brimming with an involuntary tear,
He dreams of the gallows while smoking his water-pipe.
You know him, reader, this delicate monster,
—Hypocrite reader,—my twin,—my brother!

==== Visual art influences ====
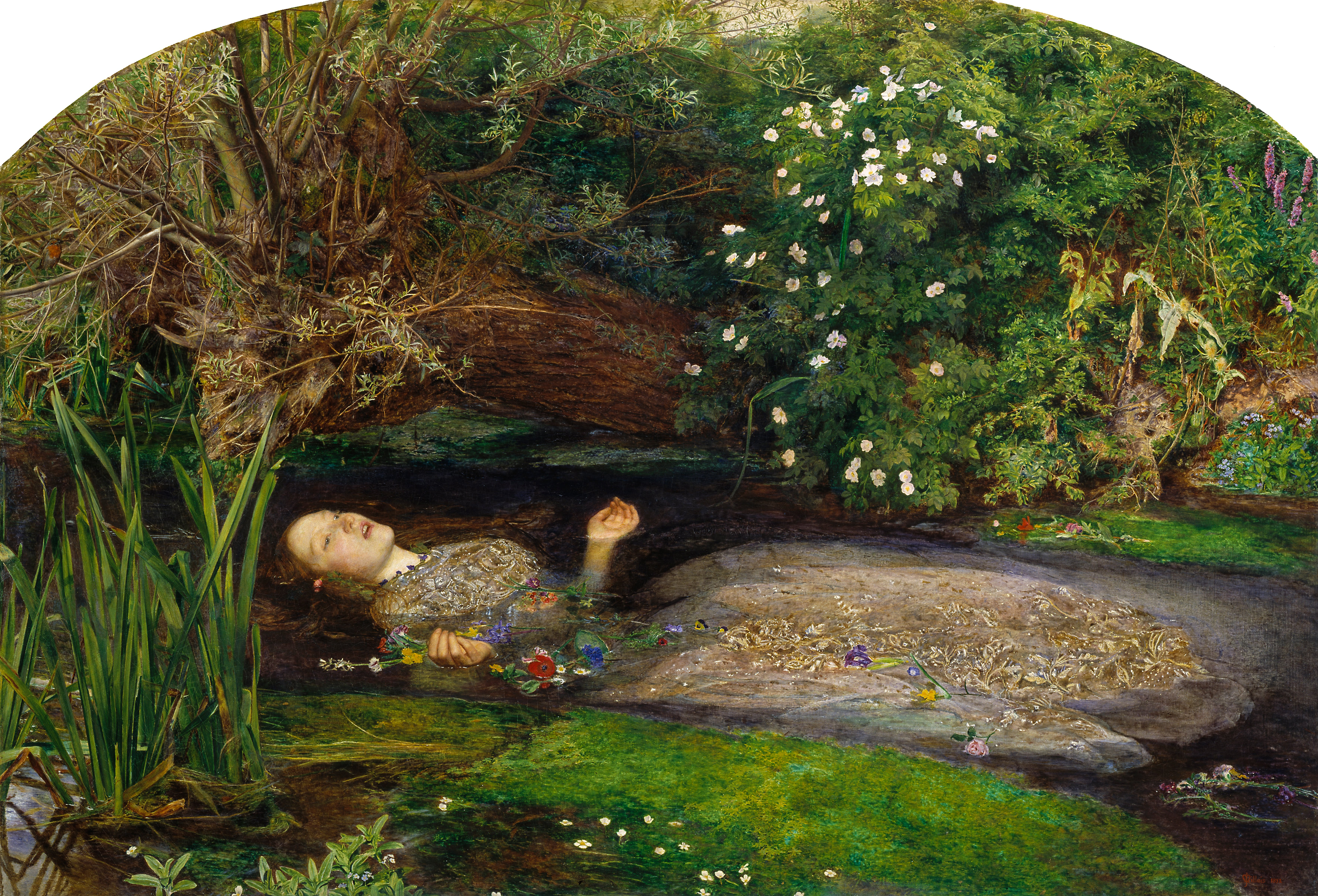
Ophelia (1851) by John Everett Millais

The gothic subculture has influenced different artists—not only musicians—but also painters and photographers. In particular their work is based on mystic, morbid and romantic motifs. In photography and painting the spectrum varies from erotic artwork to romantic images of vampires or ghosts. There is a marked preference for dark colours and sentiments, similar to Gothic fiction. At the end of the 19th century, painters like John Everett Millais and John Ruskin invented a new kind of Gothic.

=== Films and television ===
Film poster for The Hunger, an influence in the early days of the goth subculture

Some of the early gothic rock and deathrock artists adopted traditional horror film images and drew on horror film soundtracks for inspiration. Their audiences responded by adopting appropriate dress and props. Use of standard horror film props such as swirling smoke, rubber bats, and cobwebs featured as gothic club décor from the beginning in The Batcave. Such references in bands' music and images were originally tongue-in-cheek, but as time went on, bands and members of the subculture took the connection more seriously. As a result, morbid, supernatural and occult themes became more noticeably serious in the subculture. The interconnection between horror and goth was highlighted in its early days by The Hunger, a 1983 vampire film starring David Bowie, Catherine Deneuve and Susan Sarandon. The film featured gothic rock group Bauhaus performing Bela Lugosi's Dead in a nightclub. Tim Burton created a storybook atmosphere filled with darkness and shadow in some of his films like Beetlejuice (1988), Batman (1989), Edward Scissorhands (1990), Batman Returns (1992) and the stop motion film The Nightmare Before Christmas (1993), which was produced/co-written by Burton.

As the subculture became well-established, the connection between goth and horror fiction became almost a cliché, with goths quite likely to appear as characters in horror novels and film. For example, The Craft, The Crow, The Matrix and Underworld film series drew directly on goth music and style. The dark comedies Beetlejuice, The Faculty, American Beauty, Wedding Crashers, and a few episodes of the animated TV show South Park portray or parody the goth subculture. In South Park, several of the fictional schoolchildren are depicted as goths. The goth kids on the show are depicted as finding it annoying to be confused with the Hot Topic "vampire" kids from the episode "The Ungroundable" in season 12, and even more frustrating to be compared with emo kids. The goth kids are usually depicted listening to gothic music, writing or reading Gothic poetry, drinking coffee, flipping their hair, and smoking.

Morticia Addams from The Addams Family created by Charles Addams is a fictional character and the mother in the Addams Family. Morticia was played by Carolyn Jones in the 1964 television show The Addams Family and by Anjelica Huston in the 1991 version.

A recurring sketch in the 1990s on NBC's Saturday Night Live was Goth Talk, in which a public access channel broadcast hosted by unpopular young goths would continually be interrupted by the more "normal" kids in school. The sketch featured series regulars Will Ferrell, Molly Shannon, and Chris Kattan.

== Characteristics of the scene ==
=== Icons ===
Goth icons include several bandleaders: Siouxsie Sioux of Siouxsie and the Banshees, Robert Smith of the Cure, Peter Murphy of Bauhaus, Dave Vanian of The Damned; Rozz Williams of Christian Death, Olli Wisdom leader of the band Specimen, and keyboardist Jonathan Melton aka Jonny Slut, who evolved the Batcave style. Nick Cave was dubbed as "the grand lord of gothic lushness".

=== Fashion ===
==== Male and female references ====
One female role model is Theda Bara, the 1910s femme fatale known for her dark eyeshadow.

Siouxsie was particularly influential on the dress style of the gothic rock scene; Paul Morley of NME described Siouxsie and the Banshees' 1980 gig at Futurama: "[Siouxsie was] modeling her newest outfit, the one that will influence how all the girls dress over the next few months. About half the girls at Leeds had used Sioux as a basis for their appearance, hair to ankle". Other singers such as Nico, David Bowie Robert Smith, and Lux Interior are also style icons, like pop culture figures such as Bettie Page, Vampira, Morticia Addams, Musidora and Bela Lugosi,

==== Styling ====
Prior to the emergence of the scene in the early 1980s, Karl Lagerfeld had hosted in 1977 the Soirée Moratoire Noir party, specifying "tenue tragique noire absolument obligatoire" (black tragic dress absolutely required). The event included elements associated with leatherman style.

Gothic fashion is marked by conspicuously dark, antiquated and homogeneous features. It is stereotyped as eerie, mysterious, complex and exotic. A dark, sometimes morbid fashion and style of dress, typical gothic fashion includes colored black hair and black period-styled clothing. Both male and female goths wear dark eyeliner and dark fingernail polish, most especially black. Styles are often borrowed from punk fashion and—more currently—from the Victorian and Elizabethan periods. It also frequently expresses pagan, occult or other religious imagery. Gothic fashion and styling may also feature silver jewelry and piercings.

Ted Polhemus described goth fashion as a "profusion of black velvets, lace, fishnets and leather tinged with scarlet or purple, accessorized with tightly laced corsets, gloves, precarious stilettos and silver jewelry depicting religious or occult themes".

In contrast to the LARP-based Victorian and Elizabethan pomposity of the 2000s, the more Romantic side of 1980s trad-goth—mainly represented by women—was characterized by new wave/post-punk-oriented hairstyles (both long and short, partly shaved and teased) and street-compliant clothing, including black frill blouses, midi dresses or tea-length skirts, and floral lace tights, Dr. Martens, spike heels (pumps), and pointed toe buckle boots (winklepickers), sometimes supplemented with accessories such as bracelets, chokers and bib necklaces. This style, retroactively referred to as Ethergoth, took its inspiration from Siouxsie Sioux and mid-1980s musicians from the 4AD roster like Elizabeth Fraser and Lisa Gerrard.

The New York Times noted: "The costumes and ornaments are a glamorous cover for the genre's somber themes. In the world of Goth, nature itself lurks as a malign protagonist, causing flesh to rot, rivers to flood, monuments to crumble and women to turn into slatterns, their hair streaming and lipstick askew".

Cintra Wilson declares that the origins of the dark romantic style are found in the "Victorian cult of mourning." Valerie Steele is an expert in the history of the style.

==== Reciprocity with fashion designers ====
Goth fashion has a reciprocal relationship with the fashion world. The 1980s established designers such as Drew Bernstein of Lip Service, and the 1990s saw a surge of US-based gothic fashion designers, many of whom continue to evolve the style to the present day. Style magazines such as Gothic Beauty have given repeat features to a select few gothic fashion designers who began their labels in the 1990s, such as Kambriel, Rose Mortem, and Tyler Ondine of Heavy Red.

In the later part of the first decade of the 21st century, designers such as Alexander McQueen, Anna Sui, Rick Owens, Gareth Pugh, Ann Demeulemeester, Philipp Plein, Hedi Slimane, John Richmond, John Galliano, Olivier Theyskens and Yohji Yamamoto brought elements of goth to runways. This was described as "Haute Goth" by Cintra Wilson in the New York Times.

Thierry Mugler, Claude Montana, Jean Paul Gaultier and Christian Lacroix have also been associated with the fashion trend. In Spring 2004, Riccardo Tisci, Jean Paul Gaultier, Raf Simons and Stefano Pilati dressed their models as "glamorous ghouls dressed in form-fitting suits and coal-tinted cocktail dresses". Swedish designer Helena Horstedt and jewelry artist Hanna Hedman also practice a goth aesthetic.

=== Books and magazines ===
A prominent American literary influence on the gothic scene was provided by Anne Rice's re-imagining of the vampire in 1976. In The Vampire Chronicles, Rice's characters were depicted as self-tormentors who struggled with alienation, loneliness, and the human condition. Not only did the characters torment themselves, but they also depicted a surreal world that focused on uncovering its splendour. These Chronicles assumed goth attitudes, but they were not intentionally created to represent the gothic subculture. Their romance, beauty, and erotic appeal attracted many goth readers, making her works popular from the 1980s through the 1990s. While Goth has embraced Vampire literature both in its 19th century form and in its later incarnations, Rice's postmodern take on the vampire mythos has had a "special resonance" in the subculture. Her vampire novels feature intense emotions, period clothing, and "cultured decadence". Her vampires are socially alienated monsters, but they are also stunningly attractive. Rice's goth readers tend to envision themselves in much the same terms and view characters like Lestat de Lioncourt as role models.

Richard Wright's novel Native Son contains gothic imagery and themes that demonstrate the links between blackness and the gothic; themes and images of "premonitions, curses, prophecies, spells, veils, demonic possessions, graves, skeletons" are present, suggesting gothic influence. Other classic themes of the gothic are present in the novel, such as transgression and unstable identities of race, class, gender, and nationality.

The re-imagining of the vampire continued with the release of Poppy Z. Brite's book Lost Souls in October 1992. Despite the fact that Brite's first novel was criticized by some mainstream sources for allegedly "lack[ing] a moral center: neither terrifyingly malevolent supernatural creatures nor (like Anne Rice's protagonists) tortured souls torn between good and evil, these vampires simply add blood-drinking to the amoral panoply of drug abuse, problem drinking and empty sex practiced by their human counterparts", many of these so-called "human counterparts" identified with the teen angst and goth music references therein, keeping the book in print. Upon release of a special 10th anniversary edition of Lost Souls, Publishers Weekly—the same periodical that criticized the novel's "amorality" a decade prior—deemed it a "modern horror classic" and acknowledged that Brite established a "cult audience".

The 2002 release 21st Century Goth by Mick Mercer, an author, noted music journalist and leading historian of gothic rock, explored the modern state of the goth scene around the world, including South America, Japan, and mainland Asia. His previous 1997 release, Hex Files: The Goth Bible, similarly took an international look at the subculture.

In the US, Propaganda was a gothic subculture magazine founded in 1982. In Italy, Ver Sacrum covers the Italian goth scene, including fashion, sexuality, music, art and literature. Some magazines, such as the now-defunct Dark Realms and Goth Is Dead included goth fiction and poetry. Other magazines cover fashion (e.g., Gothic Beauty); music (e.g., Severance) or culture and lifestyle (e.g., Althaus e-zine).

On 31 October 2011, ECW Press published the Encyclopedia Gothica written by author and poet Liisa Ladouceur with illustrations done by Gary Pullin. This non-fiction book describes over 600 words and phrases relevant to Goth subculture.

Brian Craddock's 2017 novel Eucalyptus Goth charts a year in the life of a household of 20-somethings in Brisbane, Australia. The central characters are deeply entrenched in the local gothic subculture, with the book exploring themes relevant to the characters, notably unemployment, mental health, politics, and relationships.

=== Graphic art ===
Visual contemporary graphic artists with this aesthetic include Gerald Brom, Dave McKean, and Trevor Brown as well as illustrators Edward Gorey, Charles Addams, and James O'Barr. The artwork of Polish surrealist painter Zdzisław Beksiński is often described as gothic. British artist Anne Sudworth published a book on gothic art in 2007.

=== Events ===
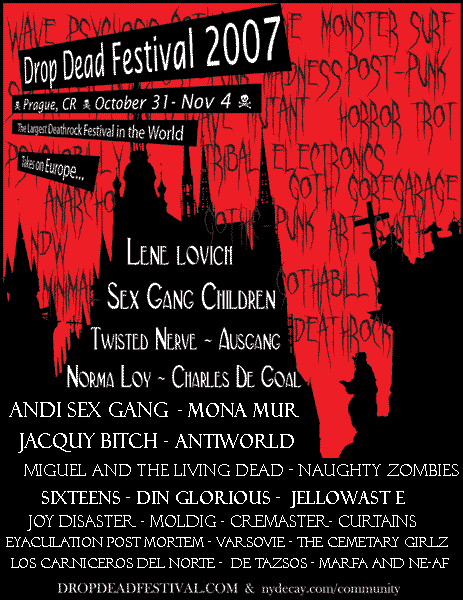
A poster for the 2007 Drop Dead Festival

There are large annual goth-themed festivals in Germany, including Wave-Gotik-Treffen in Leipzig and M'era Luna in Hildesheim, both annually attracting tens of thousands of people. Castle Party is the biggest goth festival in Poland.

== Sociology ==
=== Gender and sexuality ===
Since the late 1970s, the UK goth scene refused "traditional standards of sexual propriety" and accepted and celebrated "unusual, bizarre or deviant sexual practices". In the 2000s, many members "... claim overlapping memberships in the queer, polyamorous, bondage-discipline/sadomasochism, and pagan communities".

Though sexual empowerment is not unique to women in the goth scene, it remains an important part of many goth women's experience: The "... [s]cene's celebration of active sexuality" enables goth women "... to resist mainstream notions of passive femininity". They have an "active sexuality" approach which creates "gender egalitarianism" within the scene, as it "allows them to engage in sexual play with multiple partners while sidestepping most of the stigma and dangers that women who engage in such behavior" outside the scene frequently incur, while continuing to "... see themselves as strong".

Men dress up in an androgynous way: "... Men 'gender blend,' wearing makeup and skirts". In contrast, the "... women are dressed in sexy feminine outfits" that are "... highly sexualized" and which often combine "... corsets with short skirts and fishnet stockings". Androgyny is common among the scene: "... androgyny in Goth subcultural style often disguises or even functions to reinforce conventional gender roles". It was only "valorised" for male goths, who adopt a "feminine" appearance, including "make-up, skirts and feminine accessories" to "enhance masculinity" and facilitate traditional heterosexual courting roles.

=== Identity ===
While goth is a music-based scene, the goth subculture is also characterized by particular aesthetics, outlooks, and a "way of seeing and of being seen". The last years, through social media, goths are able to meet people with similar interests, learn from each other, and finally, to take part in the scene. These activities on social media are the manifestation of the same practices which are taking place in goth clubs. This is not a new phenomenon since before the rise of social media on-line forums had the same function for goths. Observers have raised the issue of to what degree individuals are truly members of the goth subculture. On one end of the spectrum is the "Uber goth", a person who is described as seeking a pallor so much that they apply "...as much white foundation and white powder as possible". On the other end of the spectrum exists what another writer terms "poseurs" - "goth wannabes, usually young kids going through a goth phase who do not hold to goth sensibilities but want to be part of the goth crowd". It has been said that a "mall goth" is a teen who dresses in a goth style and spends time in malls with a Hot Topic store, but who does not know much about goth subculture or its music, thus making them a poseur. In one case, even a well-known performer has been labelled with the pejorative term - a "number of goths, especially those who belonged to this subculture before the late-1980s, reject Marilyn Manson as a poseur who undermines the true meaning of goth".

=== Media and academic commentary ===
The BBC described academic research that indicated that goths are "refined and sensitive, keen on poetry and books, not big on drugs or anti-social behaviour". Teens often stay in the subculture "into their adult life", and they are likely to become well-educated and enter professions such as medicine or law. The subculture carries on appealing to teenagers who are looking for meaning and for identity. The scene teaches teens that there are difficult aspects to life that you "have to make an attempt to understand" or explain.

The Guardian reported that a "glue binding the [goth] scene together was drug use"; however, in the scene, drug use was varied. Goth is one of the few subculture movements that is not associated with a single drug, in the way that the Hippie subculture is associated with cannabis and the Mod subculture is associated with amphetamines. A 2006 study of young goths found that those with higher levels of goth identification had higher drug use.

=== Perception on nonviolence ===
A study conducted by the University of Glasgow, involving 1,258 youth interviewed at ages 11, 13, 15 and 19, found goth subculture to be strongly nonviolent and tolerant, thus providing "valuable social and emotional support" to teens vulnerable to self harm and mental illness.

==== School shootings ====
In the weeks following the 1999 Columbine High School massacre, media reports about the teen gunmen, Eric Harris and Dylan Klebold, portrayed them as part of a gothic cult. An increased suspicion of goth subculture subsequently manifested in the media. This led to a moral panic over teen involvement in goth subculture and a number of other activities, such as violent video games. Harris and Klebold had initially been thought to be members of "The Trenchcoat Mafia"; an informal club within Columbine High School. Later, such characterizations were considered incorrect.

Media reported that the gunman in the 2006 Dawson College shooting in Montreal, Quebec, Kimveer Singh Gill, was interested in goth subculture. Gill's self-professed love of Goth culture was the topic of media interest, and it was widely reported that the word "Goth", in Gill's writings, was a reference to the alternative industrial and goth subculture rather than a reference to gothic rock music. Gill, who committed suicide after the attack, wrote in his online journal: "I'm so sick of hearing about jocks and preps making life hard for the goths and others who look different, or are different".

Mick Mercer stated that Gill was "not a Goth. Never a Goth. The bands he listed as his chosen form of ear-bashing were relentlessly metal and standard grunge, rock and goth metal, with some industrial presence". Mercer stated that "Kimveer Gill listened to metal", "He had nothing whatsoever to do with Goth" and further commented "I realise that like many Neos [neophyte], Kimveer Gill may even have believed he somehow was a Goth, because they're [Neophytes] only really noted for spectacularly missing the point".

=== Prejudice and violence directed at goths ===
In part because of public misunderstanding surrounding gothic aesthetics, people in the goth subculture sometimes suffer prejudice, discrimination, and intolerance. As is the case with members of various other subcultures and alternative lifestyles, outsiders sometimes marginalize goths, either by intention or by accident. Actress Christina Hendricks talked of being bullied as a goth at school and how difficult it was for her to deal with societal pressure: "Kids can be pretty judgmental about people who are different. But instead of breaking down and conforming, I stood firm. That is also probably why I was unhappy. My mother was mortified and kept telling me how horrible and ugly I looked. Strangers would walk by with a look of shock on their face, so I never felt pretty. I just always felt awkward".

On 11 August 2007, while walking through Stubbylee Park in Bacup, Lancashire, a young couple, Sophie Lancaster and Robert Maltby, were attacked by a group of teenagers. Lancaster subsequently died from the severe head injuries she suffered in the attack. It later emerged that the attackers had attacked the couple because they were goths. On 29 April 2008, two of the attackers, Ryan Herbert and Brendan Harris, were convicted for the murder of Lancaster and given life sentences. Three others were given lesser sentences for the assault on her boyfriend Robert Maltby. In delivering the sentence, Judge Anthony Russell stated, "This was a hate crime against these completely harmless people targeted because their appearance was different to yours". He went on to defend the goth community, calling goths "perfectly peaceful, law-abiding people who pose no threat to anybody". Judge Russell added that he "recognised it as a hate crime without Parliament having to tell him to do so and had included that view in his sentencing". Despite this ruling, a bill to add discrimination based on subculture affiliation to the definition of hate crime in British law was not presented to parliament.

In 2013, police in Manchester announced they would be treating attacks on members of alternative subcultures, such as goths, the same as they do for attacks based on race, religion, and sexual orientation.

A more recent phenomenon is the emergence of goth YouTubers who very often address the prejudice and violence against goths. These personalities create videos as a response to problems that they personally face, which include challenges such as bullying, and dealing with negative descriptions of themselves. Viewers often engage closely with these YouTubers, asking them for advice on how to deal with related personal struggles and getting responses in the form of personal messages or videos. These interactions take the form of an informal mentoring which contributes to the building of solidarity within the goth scene.

=== Self-harm studies ===
A study published on the British Medical Journal concluded that "identification as belonging to the Goth subculture [at some point in their lives] was the best predictor of self harm and attempted suicide [among young teens]", and that it was most possibly due to self-selection, with people committing self harm joining the goth subculture in order to get support from individuals with similar experiences.

According to The Guardian, some goth teens are more likely to harm themselves or attempt suicide. A medical journal study of 1,300 Scottish schoolchildren until their teen years found that the 53% of the 25 goth teens sampled had attempted to harm themselves and 47% had attempted suicide. The study found that the "correlation was stronger than any other predictor".

The authors held that most self-harm by teens was done before joining the subculture, and that joining the subculture would actually protect them and help them deal with distress in their lives, while cautioning that the study was based on a small sample size and needed replication to confirm the results. The study was criticized for using only a small sample of goth teens and not taking into account other influences and differences between types of goths.

== See also ==
- Dark academia
- Visual kei
