= For Madmen Only =

For Madmen Only may refer to:

- For Madmen Only (Atomic Opera album)
- For Madmen Only (UK Decay album)
- For Madmen Only (Waxwing album), by Waxwing
- For Madmen Only! (Roadside Picnic album) by Roadside Picnic (band)
- For Madmen Only (American documentary film about comedian Del Close)
