= Furyo =

Furyo may refer to:

- Furyo (film)
- Furyo (band)
