= Ausgang =

British rock band

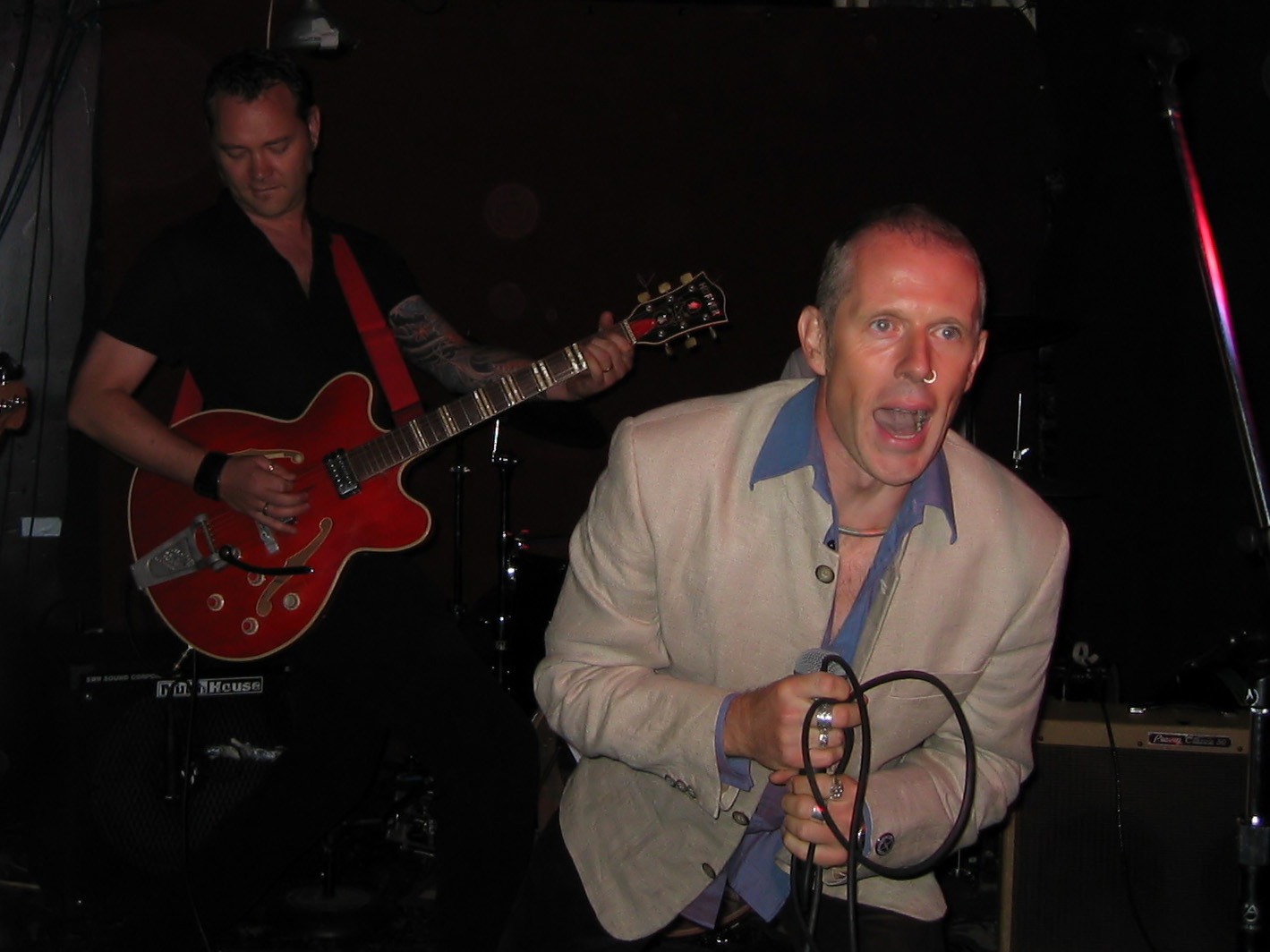
- Ausgang at Drop Dead festival 2004

Background information
- Also known as: Ausgang-A-Go-Go
- Origin: Birmingham, England
- Genres: Gothic rock, deathrock
- Years active: 1983–1987, 2003–present
- Labels: Criminal Damage, FM, Shakedown
- Past members: Max; Cub; Matthew; Ibo; Stu
- Website: ausgang.joshclark.co.uk

Ausgang (German for "exit") is an English deathrock band formed in Birmingham in 1983.

== History ==
Ausgang was formed by members of the band Kabuki. Some members had also been members of another band, the Solicitors. Max (vocals), Cub (bass guitar) and Matthew (guitar) were all previously in Kabuki, who released one 1982 single ("I Am a Horse") before splitting up. With drummer Ibo, they formed Ausgang and played their first gig in September 1983 at the Powerhouse in Birmingham. They played with the likes of Death Cult, Alien Sex Fiend, Sex Gang Children and GBH before signing to Criminal Damage Records, who released their debut EP, The Teachings of Web, in 1984. Their next release, the "Solid Glass Spine" 7" single, reached No. 28 on the UK Indie Chart. Their final release that year, the Head On ! EP, was produced by Andi Sex Gang.

Cub was replaced by Stu, and Ausgang signed to FM Records, who issued the Hunt Ya Down EP in 1985, followed by the band's debut album, Manipulate, in January 1986. After a tour with Gene Loves Jezebel, the band and label parted ways and Ausgang set up their own Shakedown label, returning with the "King Hell" 12" single later that year.

The band briefly lengthened their name to Ausgang-a-Go-Go in an attempt to break away from their 'dark/serious' reputation, releasing the Los Descamisados mini-LP under that name in 1987 before splitting up. A cassette-only collection of demos, In Retrospect (Out Of Our Minds), was released that year on the Fourth Dimension label.

In 2001, Anagram Records issued a collection, Last Exit... The Best of Ausgang.

== Reunion ==
Ausgang reformed in 2003, and issued the Licked album in 2005. The reunited band played at several editions of the Drop Dead Festival, including New York City in 2004 and 2006, and Prague in 2007. After a period of inactivity due to their bass player, Stu, falling ill and subsequently dying, the band recruited a new drummer, Victor Guillamon, and bass player, Jacob Lenadd-O'Shea, and, along with founding members, Max and Matthew continue to play shows all over the world and are in the process of recording a new album.

== Discography ==
=== Studio albums ===
- Manipulate (1985, FM)
- Licked (2005, Shakedown)

=== Singles and EPs ===
- The Teachings of Web 12" EP (1984, Criminal Damage)
- "Solid Glass Spine" 7" single (1984, Criminal Damage)
- Head On ! 12" EP (1984, Criminal Damage)
- Hunt Ya Down 12" EP (1985, FM)
- "Bad Hand" flexi 7" single (1986, Fourth Dimension)
- "King Hell" 12" single (1986, Shakedown)
- Los Descamisados mini-LP (1987, Shakedown) as Ausgang-A-Go-Go

=== Compilation albums ===
- In Retrospect (Out Of Our Minds) cassette (1987, Fourth Dimension)
- Last Exit... The Best of Ausgang (2001, Anagram)
- This Was Our Downfall - Early Demo's/Rarities (2022, Batcave Productions)

== Awards and nominations ==
| Award Ceremony | Year | Nominated work | Category | Result |
|---|---|---|---|---|
| Berlin Music Video Awards | 2019 | Backstabbers | Best Cinematography | Won |
