= The Phlegmatics =

- Origin: Houston, Texas, United States
- Genres: Power Pop Punk
- Years active: 2003–present
- Label: Pretty Good Records
- Website: www.thephlegmatics.com

The Phlegmatics are a power pop band from Houston, Texas. They are distinguished by their songs about video games, sexual angst, ancient history, social ineptitude and other viewpoints of the societal outsider, set to a powerful, melodic and quirky sound. Sara Cress of The Houston Chronicle described The Phlegmatics music as "…a sound that's smarter than blink-182 and less slick than Weezer (that's a good thing), but within the same family of rock."

== Name ==
The Phlegmatics draw their name from the ancient four humors theory of the Greek doctor Hippocrates (460–370 BC), who believed certain human moods, emotions and behaviors were caused by body fluids (called "humors"): blood, yellow bile, black bile, and phlegm. A phlegmatic person is calm and unemotional. Phlegmatic means "pertaining to phlegm", corresponds to the season of winter (wet and cold), and connotes the element of water. While phlegmatics are generally self-content and kind, their shy personality can often inhibit enthusiasm in others and make themselves lazy and resistant to change.

== History ==
Formed in 2003, The Phlegmatics reunited former bandmates Jonathan Marshall and Jonas Velasco (Atomic Opera), (Greytown) in what was originally an attempt to create a musical vehicle for Jonathan's younger brother Ethan. Jonathan, who had previously written songs in a style more akin to Depeche Mode, or The Cure, was already considering writing in some new style for a solo recording when he conceived of a song that would suit Ethan well. Both Jonathan's bandmates and his producer Dave Hartung loved the song, and it was agreed that Jonathan's solo recording would become The Phlegmatics first album Alumnus.

With the release of their first recording, The Phlegmatics were widely regarded as one of the best groups of its type from the Houston area. The band was nominated in both 2005 and 2006 for a Houston Press Music Award, and The Houston Chronicle declared them "Houston’s Ultimate Geek Band" in their 2005 Ultimate Houston section.

In 2007, Jonathan and Ethan's father, Dave Marshall, a veteran lead guitarist who, with Kemper Crabb, has fronted bands such as ArkAngel and Radio Halo, joined while Ethan moved to the drums. The band then recorded and released their sophomore effort, Billy the Starfighter Pilot vs. The Phlegmatics.

== Band members ==
- Jonathan Marshall – vocals, electric guitar
- Jonas Velasco – vocals, bass guitar
- Ethan Marshall – drums, vocals guitar
- Dave Marshall Marshall – electric guitar, vocals, mandolin, dobro

== Discography ==
- Alumnus (2005)
- Billy the Starfighter Pilot vs. The Phlegmatics (2009)
- Life is Better with a Soundtrack (2013)
