= New Hope for the Dead =

Studio album by UK Decay
- Released: 22 April 2013
- Recorded: 2012
- Genre: Post-punk; gothic rock
- Label: Rainbow City
- Producer: Chris Tsangarides

UK Decay chronology
Death, So Fatal (2007)	New Hope for the Dead (2013)

New Hope for the Dead is the second studio album by English rock band UK Decay. It was released 22 April 2013 by record label Rainbow City.

The album was funded via the website PledgeMusic and recorded in Dover with producer Chris Tsangarides.

The album features artwork by Italian painter Franko B.

== Reception ==
The album received positive reviews from critics. In a review for Louder Than War, Dave Jennings stated that the band "have never sounded better". Ross Watson, writing for The Skinny, gave it a four-star review, stating that the band have "proven their relevance with a fruitful set of new recordings".

== Track listing ==
All songs: Farley Hill Music 2013.

1. "Shake ‘em Up"
2. "Heavy Metal Jews"
3. "Next Generation????"
4. "Killer"
5. "This City Is a Cage"
6. "Woman With a Black Heart"
7. "Revolutionary Love Song"
8. "Shout"
9. "All the Faces in History"
10. "I Feel Good"
11. "Drink"

== Personnel ==
- Abbo – vocals, guitar
- Eddie B – bass guitar
- Raymondo – drums
- Spon – guitar, keyboards, fx
- Chairman "Che" – inspiration and cigars

Technical

- Chris Tsangarides – producer
- Franko B – Cover paintings
- Esa – Guy Fawkes painting
- Suzanne Krasnowska – sleeve design and artwork
- Hugo Glendenning – photography
- Kevin Metclafe – mastering
