= UK Decay =

English post-punk band

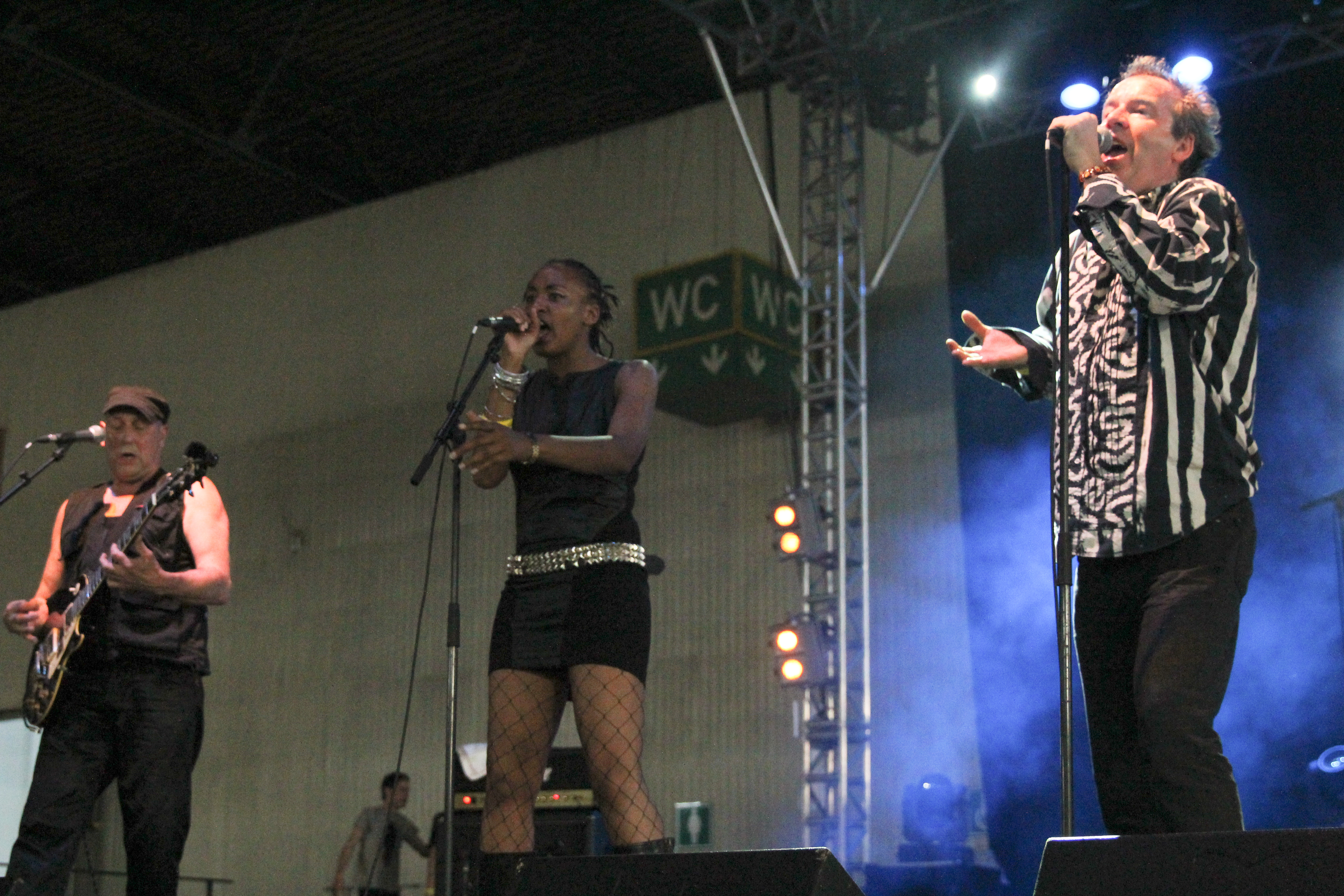
- UK Decay at the Wave-Gotik-Treffen 2014

Background information
- Origin: Luton, England
- Genres: Post-punk; gothic rock
- Years active: 1978–1983, 1993, 2005–present
- Labels: Plastic, Fresh, Corpus Christi, UK Decay, Yak, Rainbow City
- Spinoff of: The Resiztors
- Members: Steve "Abbo" Abbott; Steve Spon; Edwin "Twiggy" Branch; Ray "Raymondo" Philpott; Kyia Links
- Past members: Steven David Harle; Martin "Segovia" Smith; Lorraine "Lol" Turvey; Creetin K-OS; Jon "Guitar" Rickards; Justin Saban

UK Decay are an English post-punk band based in Luton.

== History ==
UK Decay was born from another Luton band called the Resiztors, who had formed in 1978. The Resiztors' line-up consisted of guitarist Steve "Abbo" Abbott, drummer Steven David Harle, bassist Martin "Segovia" Smith and vocalists Ricky Smith and Paul Wilson. After the vocalists' departure in the spring of 1979, the remaining band members changed their name to UK Decay, with Abbott as singer (and guitarist). They soon released the Split Single 7-inch EP in partnership with fellow local band Pneumania, on their own Plastic Records label. The EP featured two tracks from each band, with UK Decay contributing "UK Decay" and "Car Crash". Split Single sold extremely well, mainly thanks to a damning review in the NME by Danny Baker and Charles Shaar Murray. At the same time, some UK Decay members produced their own monthly fanzine The Suss and ran their own punk record and clothes shop called Matrix. Guitarist Steve Spon was soon recruited from Pneumania, allowing Abbo to concentrate on frontman duties.

The next release for Plastic Records was UK Decay's The Black 45 four-song EP, issued in early 1980. It hovered in the UK Indie Chart for 15 months. Alex Howe from Fresh Records offered to license the first two singles, and signed UK Decay to the label. The first official release for Fresh was the single "For My Country", issued in September 1980. "For My Country" received airplay from John Peel (for whom they would record two sessions) and spent eight months in the indie chart, reaching No. 13. The single was promoted by a major UK tour with hardcore punk band Dead Kennedys. By 1981, two further singles had also been released, "Unexpected Guest" and "Sexual". The former achieved the band's highest indie chart placing of No. 4, and paved the way for UK Decay's debut album, For Madmen Only, released by Fresh in December 1981. The album had taken a year to gestate, due to delays caused by a time-consuming US tour and a frustrating search for a new permanent bass player. When original bassist Smith left, Lorraine "Lol" Turvey from the Statics stood in for some UK dates and an early 1981 European tour. For the US jaunt and subsequent UK tours in spring 1981, Creetin K-OS (of US punks Social Unrest) stood in. Following that stint, K-OS returned home and Eddie "Twiggy" Branch from Northampton joined on bass, just in time to finish the album. During this period, Abbo jokingly referred to the band's sound as "goth" in a Sounds interview, helping to immortalize the beginning of the gothic rock movement, although UK Decay considered themselves a punk band first and foremost.

In early 1982, Fresh Records collapsed, and UK Decay were caught up in the ensuing management buyout by what would become Jungle Records. With the help of John Loder and Southern Studios, they managed to buy up the rights to their back catalogue and set up their own label, UK Decay Records. Loder also introduced them to Penny Rimbaud from Crass, which resulted in the Rising from the Dread 12-inch EP (featuring the 10-minute epic "Werewolf") being issued on Crass' Corpus Christi label in August 1982. However, despite a strong showing in the independent charts and an ever-expanding fanbase, the five years of continuous touring took their toll and UK Decay split up in December 1982. Posthumous cassette-only live album A Night for Celebration was released in mid 1983.

Abbo, Harle and Branch would regroup with new guitarist Albie de Luca (formerly of Gene Loves Jezebel) as Furyo in mid-1983, releasing two mini-albums through the following year and recording an unreleased album before splitting again in early 1985.

Spon went on to form In Excelsis with former members of Ritual; the group released several singles and an album on Jungle Records. He later formed the trio the Big Eye, released two EPS and a CD during 1994–95 on the Hydrogen Dukebox label. He also released several solo singles and two techno albums (from 1997 through 2011) under the name "Nostramus".

Branch played bass in Peter Murphy's band from 1986 to 1992, appearing on several albums.

Steve Harle, who like Abbo, later worked in tour management, died in May 1995 in Bangalore, India.

=== Reunion and reformation ===
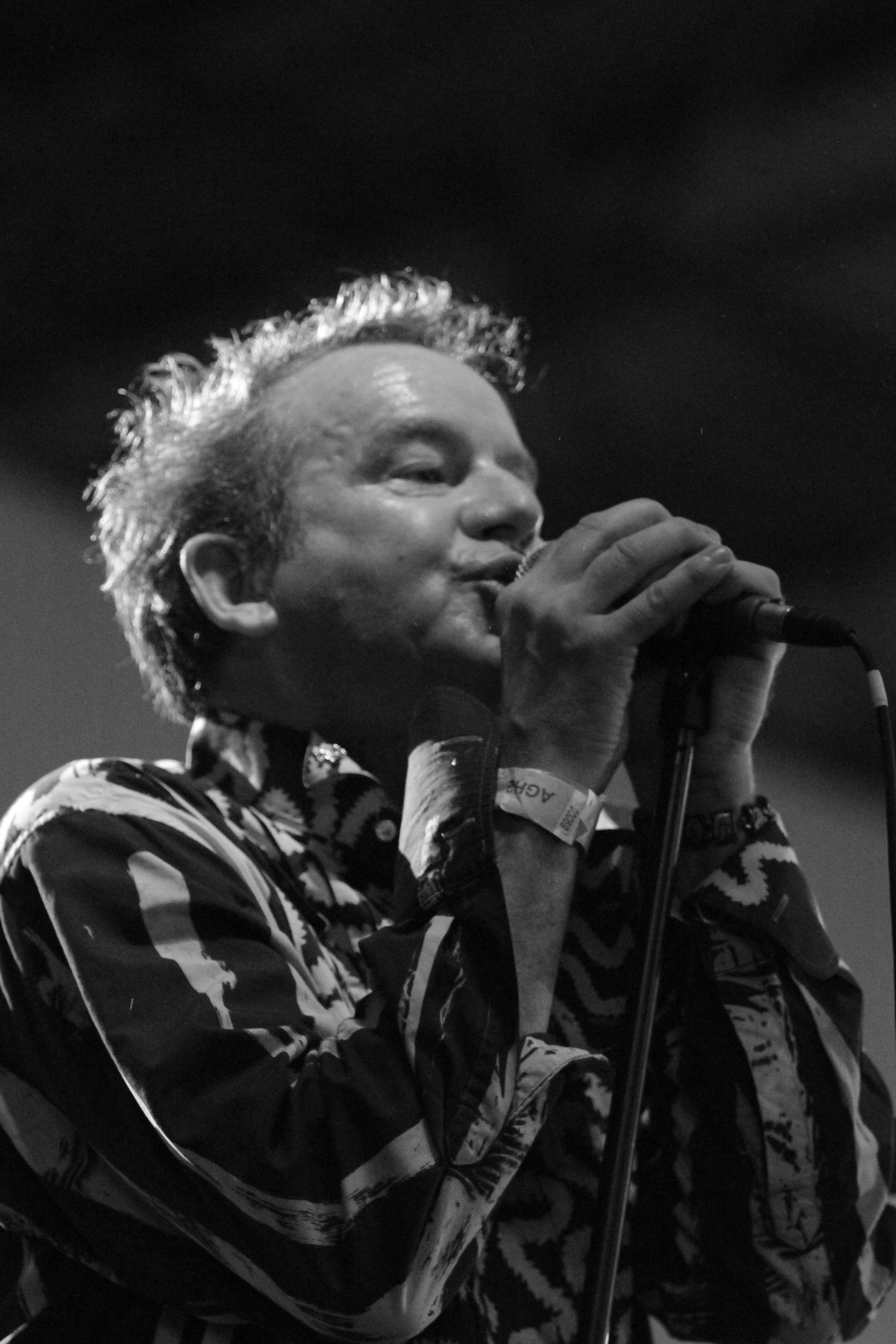
Wave-Gotik-Treffen 2014

Following a brief 1993 reunion (in which three of their older tracks were rerecorded), UK Decay resumed activity in the early 2000s, launching a website and reissuing A Night for Celebration in 2005 in an expanded deluxe edition titled Nights for Celebration. 2007 saw the release of compilation Death, So Fatal, containing a mix of demos, single tracks, Peel sessions and the 1993 remakes.

In 2008, UK Decay reformed for a UK reunion gig and to headline the Drop Dead Festival in Lisbon, Portugal, joined by new drummer Ray "Raymondo" Philpott. Footage from the concert appeared instantly on social media and reignited the band's dormant fanbase as well as the attention of listeners too young to have witnessed the band before. This renewed surge of interest led to further bookings, including a tour of Italy in April 2009, an August 2009 appearance at the Rebellion Festival in Blackpool, and other headlining festival appearances across Europe.

For Madmen Only was reissued on both CD and digital media in 2009, with the Rising from the Dread EP and several single-only tracks appended. Beginning with their November 2012 headlining appearance at the Drop Dead Festival in Berlin, the band were augmented by second guitarist Jon "Guitar" Rickards (like Philpott, a former member of the Hangman's Beautiful Daughters).

The current quartet released the single "Killer"/"Heavy Metal Jews" in February 2013 on the Rainbow City Records label, earning strong reviews. A London concert coinciding with the single affirmed the band's popular resurgence, with journalist Dave Jennings declaring, "Their reunion has proved they are more capable of creating a sound that is current and essential than many of the new young bands that hog the spotlight but actually say very little".

UK Decay's second studio album, New Hope for the Dead, was produced by Chris Tsangarides and released on 22 May 2013, followed by the Wonderful Town EP in April 2014. Rickards then departed from the band, replaced that summer by Justin Saban, and Kyia Links also joined around the same time as a backing vocalist. Saban eventually left in 2020.

== Members ==
Current

- Steve Abbott – lead vocals, guitars (1978–1983, 1993, 2005–present)
- Steve Spon – guitars, keyboards (1978–1983, 1993, 2005–present)
- Eddie Branch – bass (1981–1983, 1993, 2005–present)
- Ray Philpott – drums (2005–present)
- Kyia Links – backing vocals (2014–present)

Former

- Steven Harle – drums (1978–1983, 1993); died 1995
- Martin Smith – bass (1978–1981)
- Lorraine Turvey – bass (1981)
- Creetin K-OS – bass (1981)
- Jon Rickards – guitars (2012–2014)
- Justin Saban – guitars (2014–2020)

== Discography ==
=== Studio albums ===
- For Madmen Only (Fresh Records, October 1981) (reissue UK Decay Records, 2009)
- New Hope for the Dead (Rainbow City Records, May 2013)

=== Live albums ===
- A Night for Celebration cassette (UK Decay Records, 1983)

=== Compilation albums ===
- Death, So Fatal CD (Yak Records, 2007)

=== Singles and EPs ===
- Split Single 7-inch EP (Plastic Records, 1979; split single with Pneumania)
- The Black 45 7-inch EP (Plastic Records, January 1980)
- "For My Country" 7-inch single (Fresh Records, August 1980)
- "Unexpected Guest" 7-inch single (Fresh Records, February 1981)
- "Sexual" 7-inch single (Fresh Records, October 1981)
- Rising from the Dread 12-inch EP (Corpus Christi Records, August 1982)
- "Killer" 7-inch single (Rainbow City Records, February 2013)
- Wonderful Town 7-inch EP (UK Decay Records, April 2014)
