= For Madmen Only (UK Decay album) =

Studio album by UK Decay
- Released: October 1981
- Recorded: February – August 1981
- Genre: Post-punk; gothic rock
- Label: Fresh
- Producer: UK Decay, John Loder

UK Decay chronology
The Black 45 EP (1980)	For Madmen Only (1981)	Rising from the Dread (1982)

For Madmen Only is the first studio album by English rock band UK Decay. It was released in October 1981 by record label Fresh.

== Track listing ==
All songs written by UK Decay.

A1. "Duel"
A2. "Battle of the Elements"
A3. "Shattered"
A4. "Stage Struck"
A5. "Last in the House of Flames"
B1. "Unexpected Guest"
B2. "Sexual"
B3. "Dorian"
B4. "Decadence"
B5. "Mayday Malady"
B6. "For Madmen Only"

== Critical reception ==
Professional ratings
Review scores
Source	Rating
Record Collector	4/5 stars
ZigZag	favourable

Record Collector called the album "a mature statement from beginning to end".

== Personnel ==
- Creeton (Creeton K-OS) – bass guitar, production
- Twiggy – bass guitar, production
- Steven (Steve Harle) – drums, production
- Spon (Steve Spon) – guitar, piano, production
- Abbo (Steven Abbot) – vocals, recording

Technical

- Bernard Chandler – sleeve design and artwork
- Jan Toorop – front cover painting The Disintegration of Faith
- John Loder – engineering, production
- Simon Scofield – engineering
- Tony Cook – engineering
