= Kemper Crabb =

American musician

- Origin: Houston, Texas, U.S.
- Years active: 1982–present
- Labels: Fever Dream
- Website: kempercrabb.net

Kemper Crabb is an American musician. His style is reminiscent of 'Olde English,' and his music has been described as 'Celtic, Medieval, intelligent and sacred'. He has produced over 8 albums, with The Vigil (1982) selling over one hundred thousand copies on vinyl. He is also an Episcopal priest.

He has been a member of the groups ArkAngel, Atomic Opera, and Caedmon's Call.

He has been an associated act with The Phlegmatics and a guest musician on In the Company of Angels.

== Discography ==
- Look Up - as Redemption (1972)
- Warrior - as ArkAngel (1980)
- The Vigil - (1982)
- Illumination - as RadioHalo (1992)
- A Medieval Christmas - (1996)
- Live at the Rivendell Cafe - (1996)
- Flotsam and Jetsam - (2000)
- Live at Cornerstone - (2000)
- Downe in Yon Forrest - (2009)
- Reliquarium - (2010)

== Guest appearances ==
- Be Exalted – John Michael Talbot and friends (1986)
- Faith Hope Love – King's X (1990)
- Penguin Dust – Atomic Opera (1998)
- Gospel Cola – Atomic Opera (2000)
