= Furyo (band) =

English gothic rock band

- Origin: Luton, England
- Genres: Deathrock; Gothic rock
- Years active: 1983–1985
- Labels: Anagram; Furyo Records
- Members: Steven Abbot; Steve Harle; Eddie Branch; Albie de Luca

Furyo were an English gothic rock band who formed in Luton in mid-1983 after UK Decay split. They split early in 1985.

== History ==
UK Decay members Steve "Abbo" Abbot, Steve Harle and Eddie Branch stayed together after that band split. The three recorded under the name Slavedrive on compilation LP The Whip (though the CD reissue credits the song to UK Decay) and as Meat of Youth on LP Young Limbs, Numb Hymns: The Batcave Compilation, with a guitarist named Patrick Egan (ex Where's Lisse) who soon left.

They were joined by guitarist Albie de Luca, formerly of Gene Loves Jezebel, and renamed themselves Furyo. They played their first show in September 1983.

ZigZag described the songwriting as "Brechtian" and Abbo's vocal style as "grandiloquent". Sounds said their style "borrows the instrumental story-telling augmentation found in classical music." Trouser Press described them as "attempting even weightier and more baroque compositions [than UK Decay]".

The band released two mini-albums, Furioso and Furyo, and recorded an unreleased album (announced but not released by Grim Humour fanzine) before splitting again in early 1985.

== Discography ==
=== Albums and singles ===
- Furioso 12" (Furyo/Anagram 12-ANA-24, 1984) - Legacy / Chorus // King of Hearts / Cavalcade
- Furyo LP (Furyo/Anagram MGRAM-12, 1984) - The Gold of Our Lives / Vultures / In the Arena // Monster of a Thousand Heads/ The Opera in the Air
- Unreleased album - Exodus / The Burden of Dreams / The World at War / Wakakoukou // Legacy / Ha Ha Ha / Whisper in the Wind
- Furyo CD (Anagram CDM-GOTH-28, 2007) (contains mini-album and 12")

=== Compilation appearances ===
- In Goth Daze (Anagram, 1994) - "Legacy"
- Gothic Erotica (Dressed To Kill, 1999) - "Legacy"
- Anagram Punk Singles (Anagram, 2000) - "Legacy"
- Flesh, Fangs & Filigree (Livid Music, 2000) - "Legacy"
