= For Madmen Only (Atomic Opera album) =

Studio album by Atomic Opera
- Released: May 10, 1994
- Studio: Rivendell Recorders, Houston, Texas
- Genre: Progressive metal
- Length: 50:39
- Label: Giant / Warner Bros.
- Producer: Sam Taylor

Atomic Opera chronology
For Madmen Only (1994)	Penguin Dust (1997)

Professional ratings
Review scores
Source	Rating
AllMusic	3/5 stars

For Madmen Only is a rock album by the band Atomic Opera, released in 1994. The album was produced by ZZ Top video producer Sam Taylor. Taylor is known for his production and management work with the band King's X early in their career. The title is a reference to a sign above a hidden door, to the Magic Theatre in Steppenwolf by Hermann Hesse.

The CD was out-of-print for many years until 2014, when in celebration of the 20th anniversary of the album's release, Frank Hart released a remastered reissue of the album, including three bonus tracks.

Some Warner Bros. Records CDs (released under the Collision Arts label) were distributed as promotional copies and have gold lettering stating this stamped on the front cover.

The video for the song "Justice" was played approximately 20 times on MTV.

== Track listing ==
1. "Joyride" – 5:11
2. "Justice" – 3:33
3. "Achilles' Heel" – 5:54
4. "I Know Better" – 4:16
5. "All Fall Down" – 3:38
6. "War Drum" – 5:33
7. "Blackness" – 4:09
8. "December" – 5:07
9. "This Side of the Rainbow" - 3:37
10. "New Dreams" - 9:41

== Performers ==
- Frank Hart - Lead vocals, Guitar
- Jonathan Marshall - Guitar, Backing Vocals
- Mark Poindexter - Drums, Backing Vocals
- Jonas Velasco - Bass, Backing Vocals

== Production ==
- Produced by Sam Taylor
- Recorded by Sam Taylor
- Engineered by Steve Ames
- Mastered by George Marino at Sterling Sound Studios, New York, NY
- Art direction by Allison Smythe, ARS Graphica, Houston, TX
- Cover design, illustration and layout by Allison Smythe and Frank Hart
- Photography by Frank Hart, Sam Taylor, Kate Warren
- Illustrations by Frank Hart and Jonas Valesco
- Drum technician: Robbie Parrish
- Guitar technician: John Ziegler
