= The Wake (American band) =

American gothic rock band

- Origin: Columbus, Ohio, United States
- Genre: Gothic rock
- Years active: 1986–present
- Labels: Blaylox Records; Cleopatra Records
- Members: Troy Payne; Richard Witherspoon; Daniel C. James Tramel
- Past members: Robert Brothers; Steven Creighton; Mark Gamiere; J. T. Murphy; Scott Rozanski
- Website: http://www.thewake.com/

The Wake is an American gothic rock band from Columbus, Ohio, United States.

The Wake has been featured on thirty plus compilations worldwide. The band has opened for bands such as NIN, Skinny Puppy, Christian Death, Innocence Mission, Alien Sex Fiend, And Also the Trees, and Shadow Project, touring extensively in the US and playing dates in Europe and Mexico.

== History ==
Formed in 1986 by vocalist Troy Payne and guitarist Richard Witherspoon in Columbus, Ohio, The Wake made its first studio recording Procession using session musicians on drums and bass in 1987. Bassist James Tramel and electronic drummer Scott Rozanski were recruited later the same year.

Drummer Daniel C. replaced Rozanski early in 1989. Keyboardist Robert Brothers joined the band in 1990. The band released their first 7ʺ vinyl single "Harlot" in 1990, along with self-titled EP on cassette.

Following on the success of "Harlot", the band released a second 7″, "Sideshow", on the Blaylox Records label in 1992, then signed with Cleopatra Records in 1993. The Wake's debut album "Masked" was released in October 1993.

After the completion of the "Masked" tour, the band parted ways with bass player James Tramel. Bassist Steven Creighton joined before the release of the Christine EP in 1995. The EP had a decidedly industrial/dance flavor, thanks in part to the re-mixes supplied by Rosetta Stone. The single "Christine" (mixed by The Wake and Zane Eric Brown) broke onto the top ten of Alternative Press's Dance Club charts where it remained for months. Also in 1995, the still popular "Christine" video was filmed in and around Mexico City during the tour supporting the EP.

In 1996, The Wake joined forces with former Ministry engineer "Fluffy" on their third CD, Nine Ways. The album was recorded and mixed at both Chicago Trax and the Chicago Recording Company.

Just before the release of Nine Ways, guitarist and co-founder Rich Witherspoon left the band and former MCA recording artist Mark Gamiere was enlisted to take over on guitar. Although no studio recordings were made with this lineup, Gamiere provided live tour support from 1996 to 2000. Other lineup changes included J. T. Murphy replacing Steven Creighton on bass in 1998, until Murphy's death. The band turned bass playing duty over to a hard-disk recorder in 1999 before the band gave way to a long-term hiatus in 2000.

Released on Blaylox Rec. in 2010, the digitally distributed single "Emily Closer" featured the reunited lineup of Payne, Witherspoon, Tramel, Brothers, and C., and was recorded and self-produced before being mastered by Howie Weinberg at Masterdisk.

In early 2014, The Wake released another online single, "Rusted", as well as a remix thereof by musician/producer John Fryer. Released on Blaylox, the single features the lineup of Troy Payne, Rich Witherspoon, and Daniel C.

In the years since, the band has released an all-new 11-track album, Perfumes and Fripperies (2020), as well as extended versions of two of their older albums, and a remix anthology EP.

== Discography ==
=== Releases ===
- The Wake (1990) EP, cassette; released in 6- and 5-track versions ("Sideshow" being the 6th track); Blaylox Records, US: BLAY 69, BLAY 691
- "Harlot" b/w "Suicide" (1990) 7″ single; black and red vinyl versions, limited edition of 1000; Blaylox: BLAY 069
- On the Ghost Train (1991) 9-track live video, VHS (NTSC), Blaylox: BLAY692GTV
- The Wake (1991, 1992) remastered EP, cassette, in 5- and 4-track versions (5-track minus "Sideshow", 4-track replacing "Sheila", "Nazarene" and "Reverend Mother" with "Sideshow" and "Audrey"); Blaylox: BLAY 0696
- "Sideshow" b/w "Audrey" (1992) 7″ single; black and purple vinyl versions, ltd. edn. of 1000; Blaylox: BLAY 0698
- Masked (1993) 10-track album, CD and cassette, Cleopatra Records, US: CLEO 9187-2, CLEO 9187-4 (2019/2021 vinyl and digital-download reissue: CLO 1279)
- Christine (1995) 7-remix anthology EP, CD, Cleopatra: CLEO 9640-2, CLEO 9187-2
- Nine Ways (1996) 10-track album, CD and cassette, Cleopatra: CLP 9708-2 (2020 vinyl reissue: CLO 1757)
- Blacklist (2007) 13-track anthology, digital download, Cleopatra; (2008) CD + DVD (NTSC) set, MVD Visual, US: MVDV4697
- "Emily Closer" (2010) 1-track single, digital download, Blaylox: DD Blay 859703130695
- "Rusted" (2014) 1-track single, digital download, Blaylox: DD Blay 859711730504
- "Rusted (John Fryer Remix)" (2014) 1-track single, digital download, Blaylox: DD Blay 859711731136
- Masked (2019) 20-track extended album reissue, ltd. edn. CD; Cleopatra: CLO 1279
- Perfumes and Fripperies (2020) 11-track album, CD and digital download, Blaylox: BLAY 0690-3
- Mixers & Elixirs (2021) 5-remix anthology EP, digital download, Blaylox
- Nine Ways (2022) 16-track extended album reissue, CD, Cleopatra: CLO 1757

=== Compilation appearances ===
- "Burial" (1989) Sprogg magazine, US, cassette
- "Nazarene" (1991), live video, Aesthetics magazine, US, CD-V (NTSC)
- "Nazarene" (1991) Gotham compilation, US, cassette
- "Harlot" (1992) Screams of Torture, Germany, cassette: NCT93-107
- "Locomotive Age" (1993) Cold Tears/Darkland of Tears, France, cassette
- "Audrey" (1993) L'appel de la Muse, Vol. III; France, CD: AJE-08
- "Harlot" (1993) The Whip Freud, Jungle Records, UK, CD: 043
- "Silent Siren" (1994) The Fallen Angel, Zoth Ommog, Germany, CD: MSRP002
- "Nazarene" (1994) Mysterious Encounters, Cleopatra Records, US, CD: CLEO 06808-2
- "Locomotive Age" (1994) In Goth Daze Cleopatra, CD: CLEO 09400-2
- "Locomotive Age" (1994) New Alternatives 2, Nightbreed Records, UK, CD
- "Sideshow" (1995) Gothik, Cleopatra, CD: CLEO 09536-2
- "Watchtower" (1995) Stars, Hide Your Fires, Hyperium, Germany, CD
- "Christine" (1995) Gothic Rock 2, Cleopatra, CD: CLEO 09648-2
- "Christine" (1996) Wired Injection, Cleopatra, CD CLEO 09675-2
- "Control" (1996) Goth Box, Cleopatra, CD: Cleo 09798-2
- "Christine" (1996) Goth Box Video: The Visual Companion, Cleopatra, DVD (NTSC): CLEO 9800
- "Watchtower (2.1 Mix)" (1997) Goth's Undead, Cleopatra, CD: CLEO 00038
- "Christine" (1997) Goth's Paradise: The Black Book Compilation, Vol. 1, Orkus, Germany, CD
- "Procession" (1997) Songs to Wake the Dead, Cleopatra/Blackrat, US, CD
- "Lightning" (1998) German Mystic Sound Sampler, Vol. VII, Zillo, Germany, CD
- "Christine" (1998) Undercurrents '98, US, CD
- "Nazarene" (1998) Gothspotting, Cleopatra, CD: CLEO 00224-2
- "Suicide" (1998) The Black Bible, Cleopatra, CD: CLEO 00387
- "Christine" (2000) Remix Collection: Gothic Industrial, Cleopatra, CD: CLEO 00914-2
- "Nazarene" (2000) This Is Goth, Cleopatra, CD
- "Christine" (2000) Dark Noise 2000, Cleopatra, CD
- "Christine" (2003) Dancing on Your Grave, Cleopatra, CD
- "Nazarene" (2004) Gothika, Cleopatra, CD: CLEO 001334-2
- "Watchtower" (2004) Strobelights,Vol 1, Strobelight Records, Austria, CD: STROB 006
- "Christine" (2005) Goth Industrial Club Anthems, Cleopatra, CD: CLEO 1466
- "Nazarene" (2006) This Is Gothic: The Bat Cave Anthology, Cleopatra, CD: CLEO 01606-2
- "Sideshow" (2006) Gothik: Special Anniversary Edition, Cleopatra, CD: CLEO 01610-2
- "Sideshow" (2006) The Goth Anthology: Underground Anthems from Rock's Dark Side, Metro Music UK, CD
- "Suicide" (2007) Gothic Compilation Part XXXVI, Batbeliever Releases, Germany, CD: BAT 038
- "Christine" (2008) Goth as F__k Special Limited Edition, Cleopatra, 12″ vinyl: CLEO 02093-1
- "Sheet Metal Eyes" (2011) Another Gift from Goth: '90s Gothic Rock Compilation, Strobelight, CD: STROB 036
