= Atomic Opera =

American hard rock band

- Origin: Houston, Texas, U.S.
- Genre: Hard rock
- Years active: 1991–present
- Website: atomicopera.com

Atomic Opera is an American hard rock band from Houston, Texas. Their style blends progressive rock, art rock, metal, medieval influences, and eastern music.

== History ==
Formed in September 1991, the band began when founding member Frank Hart moved from Missouri and joined forces with producer/manager Sam Taylor. The lineup consisting of Frank, Jonathan Marshall, Mark Poindexter, and Len Sonnier (brother of Dane Sonnier of the Galactic Cowboys), was fleshed out with a few different Houston-area musicians over the next few years.

In December 1991, Atomic Opera went into Rampart recording studio with producer Sam Taylor, and Engineer Steve Ames to record a demo consisting of the songs "For Madmen Only", "Daze of Love In Grey", "The Meaningless Word" and "everdream". They recorded more demos at Rampart in 1992.

In September 1992, Sonnier quit the band, and was replaced on bass by his good friend and bass tech, Jonas Velasco.

In 1994, after Derek Shulman, president of Collision Arts (a subsidiary of Giant Records) saw the band play live at Zelda's in Houston, he signed them on the spot. Soon, they released their first full album, For Madmen Only. During this time, the band toured with such artists as Dio and King's X. The band's video for "Justice" was played approximately 20 times on MTV.

Often compared with King's X or the Galactic Cowboys, both of whom were managed and produced by Taylor, Atomic Opera forged their own path with poetic lyrics, varied instruments, and strong Christian influences. Unlike some of their contemporaries, the band did little to hide its faith in its lyrics, but in some ways avoided the stereotypes of Christian rock, as most songs focused on challenging the norms of Christianity and on the relationship between God and man. The band was also vocal about their dislike of the Christian music industry.

The band's label Collision Arts ceased operations, and Atomic Opera found itself without a home, and released their next two albums without a supporting label. After struggling to gain mainstream popularity, the band broke up in 1995 and parted ways with Taylor. Hart continued to write music and decided to release a follow-up album in 1997 under the Atomic Opera name called Penguin Dust, recruiting former drummer Mark Poindexter and multi-instrumentalist Kemper Crabb to assist; this album was released directly by Hart and shopped to various independent outlets.

Due to the strength of Penguin Dust, Metal Blade Records quickly signed the band to a long-term deal. Crabb became a full-time member, with longtime Hart friends John Simmons and Ryan Birsinger also rounding out the lineup. While working on new material, Hart compiled the album Alpha and Oranges, a collection of unreleased demos originally from the For Madmen Only lineup, and released this independently as well. In 2000, the band released Gospel Cola on Metal Blade with its new lineup; the album garnered some positive notice in both Christian and mainstream music outlets.

Since that time, the band have endured a lot of setbacks (such as a flooded recording studio) and pursued various side projects (such as raising families, session work, multimedia projects, Hart's role as worship leader and pastor at a Houston area church, and managing Hart's label Feverdream Records). After adding Trip Wamsley to the lineup in 2004, and parting ways with Metal Blade, the band were working on a new album called The Mystery of Hope, but there has been no news on this effort for several years. The band did have a reunion concert with the original lineup in late 2014 to celebrate the 20th anniversary of the release of For Madmen Only, in addition to re-releasing a remaster of the album with bonus tracks (For Madmen Only 20 Years Later).

Marshall and Velasco formed a band called The Phlegmatics and released Alumnus (2006), Billy the Starfighter Pilot Vs. the Phlegmatics (2006), and Life Is Better With a Soundtrack (2013). Hart released the solo albums Human Liturgy (2006), Living Creatures Project (2010), and Fantastical Amazingly Jesus Christmas (2016). Hart also published the memoir Joyride: A Beginning in Every End.

== Band members ==
- Frank Hart - vocals, electric guitar, cello, bass
- Kemper Crabb - vocals, mandolin, recorder, dulcimer, harmonica (on Penguin Dust and Gospel Cola)
- Ryan Birsinger - bass, Chapman Stick, vocals (on Gospel Cola)
- Trip Wamsley - bass (joined after release of Gospel Cola)
- John Simmons - drums, vocals (on Gospel Cola)
- Mark Poindexter - drums, vocals (on For Madmen Only, Alpha and Oranges, and Penguin Dust)
- Jonas Velasco - bass, vocals (on For Madmen Only and Alpha and Oranges)
- Jonathan Marshall - electric guitar, vocals (on For Madmen Only and Alpha and Oranges)
- Len Sonnier - bass, vocals (on Alpha and Oranges)

== Discography ==
- For Madmen Only (1994)
- Penguin Dust (1997)
- Alpha and Oranges (1999)
- Gospel Cola (2000))
- The Mystery of Hope (pending)
