= Cathi Unsworth =

English writer and journalist

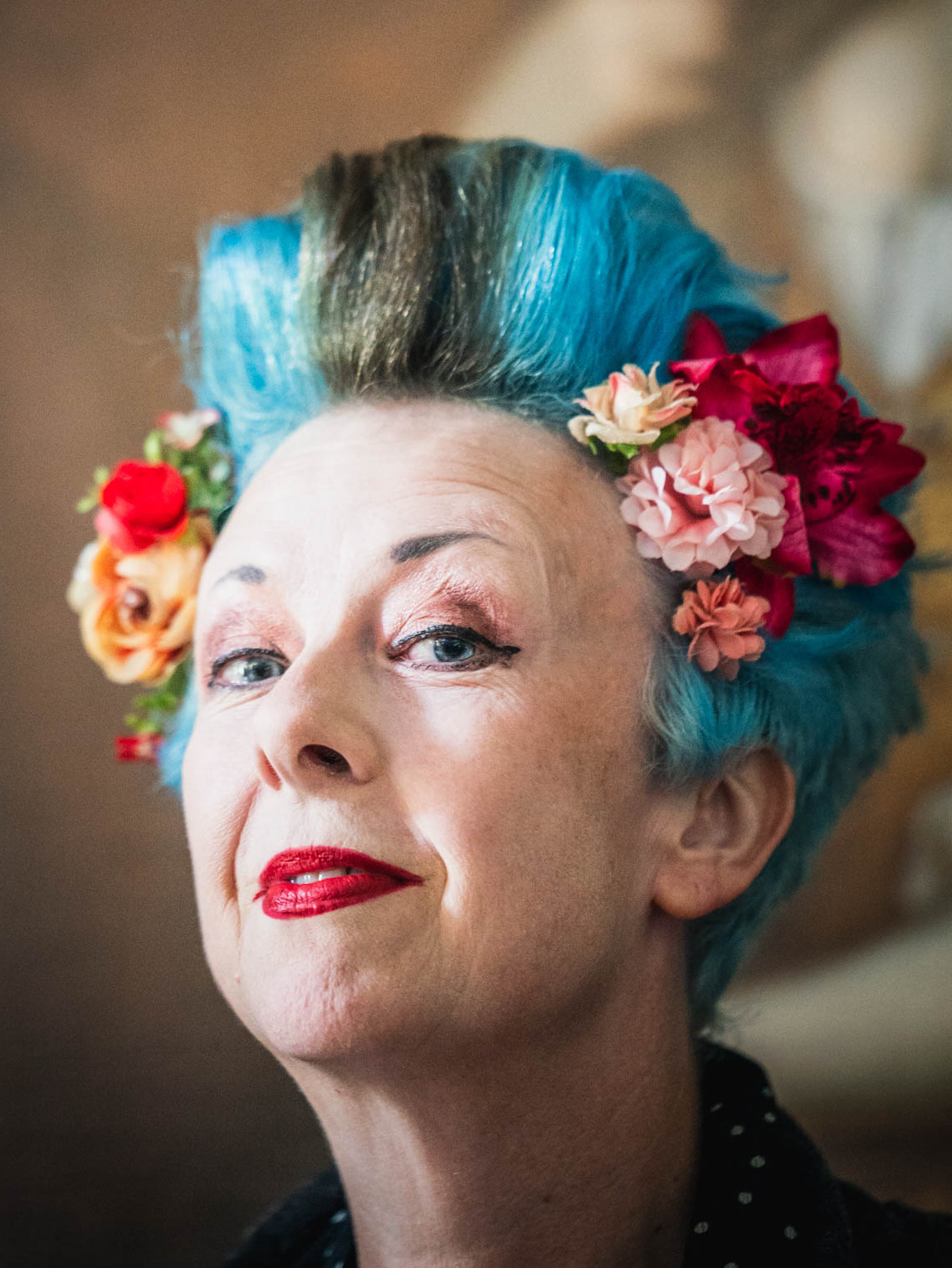
- Unsworth at Krankenhaus 2024
- Born: 11 June 1968 (age 58)
- Occupations: writer and journalist
- Writing career
- Years active: 1987–present
- Website: cathiunsworth.co.uk

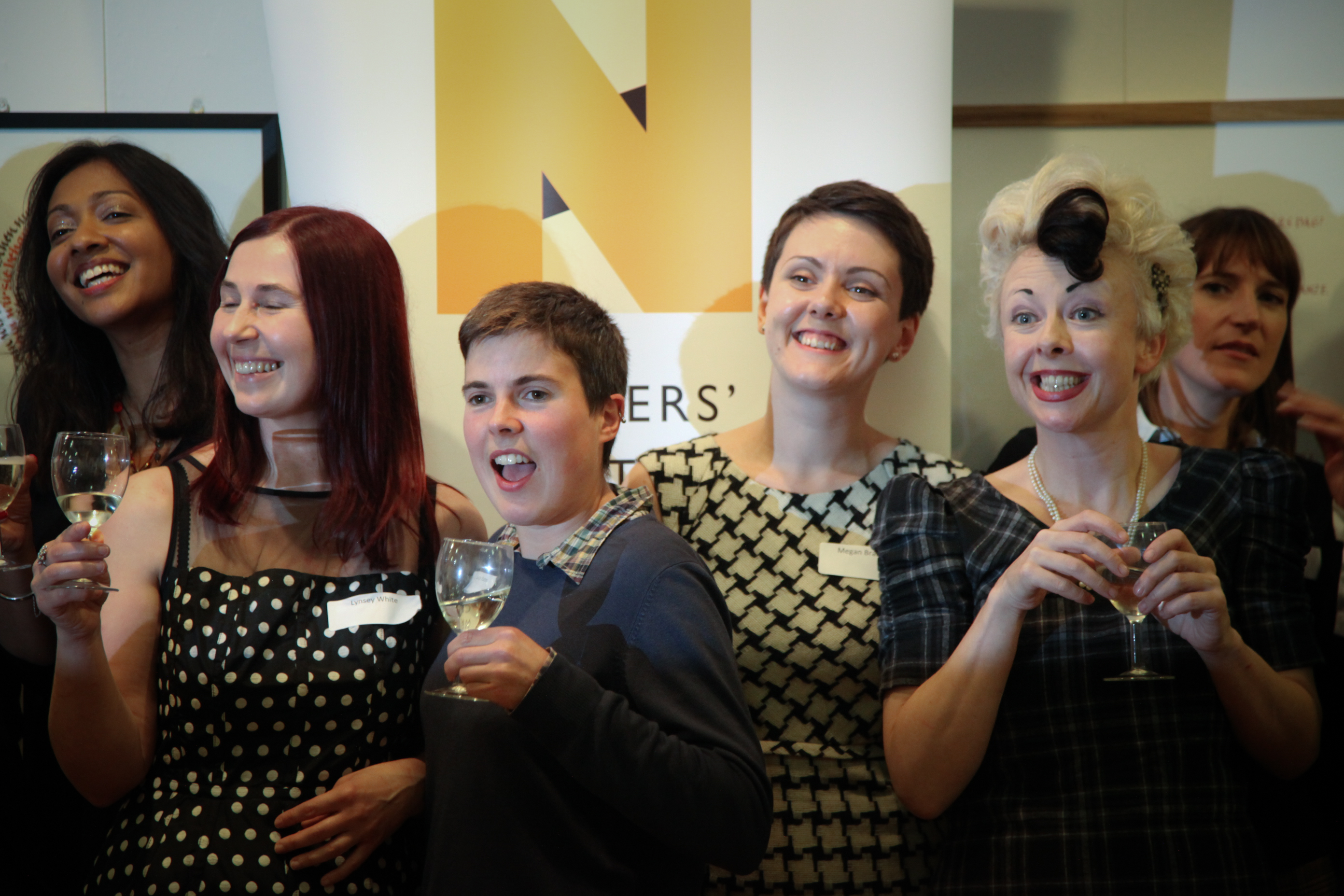
Unsworth (second from right) in 2013

Cathi Unsworth (born 11 June 1968) is an English writer and music journalist. She is the author of several crime novels and books on music history, including Season of the Witch: The Book of Goth (2023).

She has written for magazines including Melody Maker, Dazed & Confused and Bizarre, and has released several novels.

== Biography ==
Unsworth was born on 11 June 1968. She studied at the London College of Fashion and was headhunted by Melody Maker. After working for other magazines, including Purr, Sounds and Bizarre, she began writing novels. Her writing is heavily influenced by the late Derek Raymond.

Her first novels were released by Serpent's Tail. These were an expose of the psychopaths of the London media world titled The Not Knowing, in 2005, and The Singer, about the punk music industry, in 2007. She also edited its London Noir anthology in 2006. Unsworth's 2009 novel Bad Penny Blues was a historical novel following the murders of London prostitutes between 1959-1965 by a killer dubbed "Jack The Stripper" by the media, which remain unsolved.

Unsworth published seaside noir novel Weirdo, about the horrors of teenage friendship, in 2012, followed by Without the Moon in 2015. Her book Season of the Witch: The Book of Goth published in 2023, is about the music genre and the subculture that grew out of it. Mojo's Victoria Segal praised it, saying, it was a "superb history of the dark and all its risings" and adding that "it's as monumental as its subject, a real temple of love".

Unsworth has also contributed the short story Sheena Is A Punk Rocker to the anthology Punk Fiction which was sold to fundraise for the Teenage Cancer Charity Trust.

== Selected works ==
=== Novels ===
- The Not Knowing (2005)
- The Singer (2007)
- Bad Penny Blues (2009)
- Weirdo (2012)
- Without the Moon (2015)
- That Old Black Magic (2018)

=== Books ===
- Season of the Witch: The Book of Goth. Nine Eight Books. (2023) ISBN 978-1788706247

=== Short story collections ===
- London Noir: Capital Crime Fiction (2006) (as editor)

=== Other ===
- Man of Violence An essay for the sleeve notes for the DVD release from the BFI Flipside range.
- That Kind of Girl The sleeve notes for the DVD release from the BFI Flipside range.
- Defying Gravity: Jordan's Story
- The 32-page booklet accompanying the 2023 deluxe reissue of A Little Man and a House and the Whole World Window by Cardiacs.
