= Steve Abbott (musician) =

English producer, A&R executive and artist manager (born 1960)

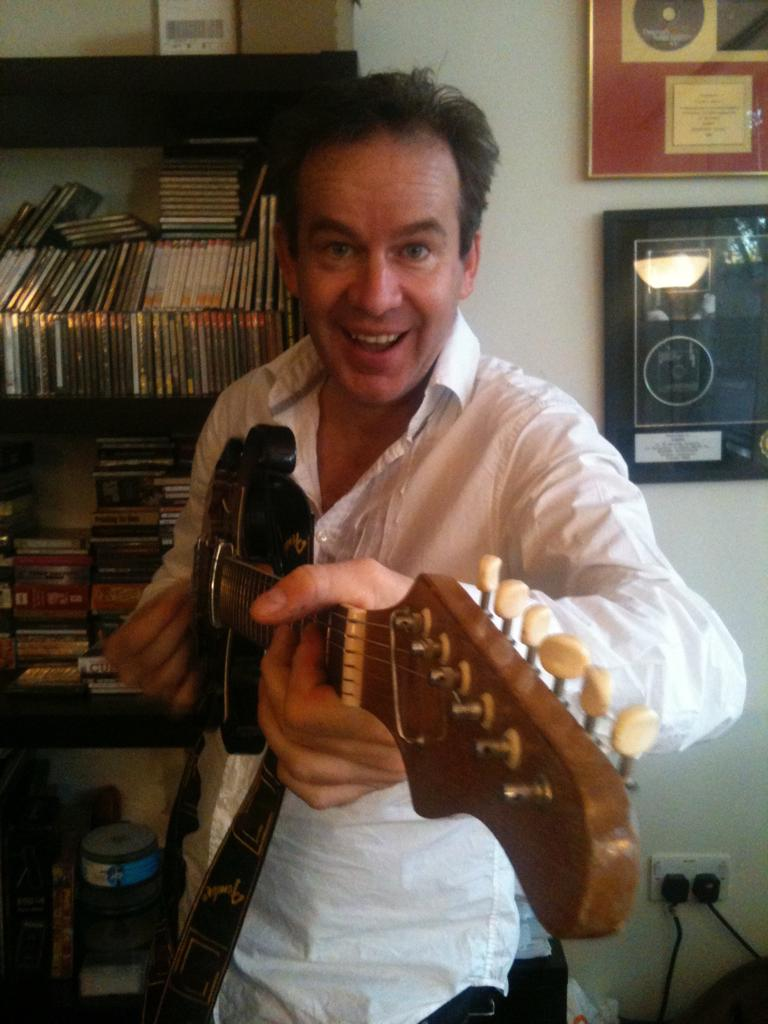
- Steve "Abbo" Abbott

Background information
- Also known as: Abbo
- Born: Steven Paul Abbott; January 1960 (age 66); Luton, England
- Genres: Post-punk; gothic rock
- Occupations: Producer, A&R executive, artist manager and concert promoter
- Years active: 1978–present
- Label: Big Cat Records UK
- Member of: UK Decay

Steven Paul Abbott is an English singer, songwriter, artist manager, concert promoter, live music agent, Artists and repertoire executive and arts consultant. He is the lead vocalist of the British post-punk band UK Decay, who were part of the first wave of gothic rock bands. Among other activities, he set up and curated Lutonia Literature Festival.

== Early life ==
Steven Paul "Abbo" Abbott grew up on the Farley Hill Estate in Luton, England. He attended Farley Junior School, Rotheram High School and Luton VI Form College.

== Career ==
=== UK Decay ===
Abbott joined Luton post-punk band The Resistors in 1978, but renamed the group "UK Decay" after seeing the phrase used on the cover story of the Daily Mirror. In an interview with Steve Keaton of Sounds music paper, Abbott used the term "Goth" to describe the band and has since been credited as the first to use the phrase to describe music and fashion.

The band toured Europe on the rock and art circuits. Having supported the Dead Kennedys on their debut UK tour, the band were invited to play with them in the US and toured for five weeks in March/April 1981, playing on bills with the fledgling West Coast scene bands, including Black Flag, DOA, Circle Jerks, Subhumans, Flipper and Social Unrest. The band were outspoken against racism and discrimination and were often targeted by right-wing political groups at their concerts, and their song "Sexual" was one of the first to take up the issue of "trans" sexuality. They made one album, entitled For Madmen Only, and five singles between 1979 and 1983, spending months in the UK Independent Charts, including the punk standard "For My Country". Abbott split from UK Decay in 1983 and formed Furyo, an experimental four-piece band, releasing a mini-album and EP in the UK and a full-length album in Japan.

== =Subsequent career ==
In 1989, Abbott started the record label called Big Cat Records. He had already been managing musical artists, and founded Bedlam Management in 1979. In the 2000s he also managed classical artists. After Abbott’s partner, Linda Obadiah, sold her 50% of Big Cat to Richard Branson's new V2 Records, Big Cat's UK and US teams became the basis of the new company’s UK and North American offices. Abbott took on the role of Head of International, helping to set the company up worldwide, moving to New York as Head of A&R North America, where he lived from 1999 until 2002.

=== Later career, return to UK Decay ===
In 2007, Abbott was a judge on the BBC Two television reality show Classical Star.

In 2008, the band reformed to perform at a number of Rock Against Racism festivals across Europe. In 2012, they recorded a new album, New Hope for the Dead, produced by Chris Tsangarides. The band also released the Wonderful Town EP in partnership with Luton Town F.C. ‘SOLYD’ and Luton Foodbank, all proceeds going to the two charities.

In 2011, Abbott was an on-screen mentor for the BBC Two series titled Goldie's Band: By Royal Appointment.

== Personal life ==
Abbott married Cerys Matthews in January 2011. Abbott is a stalwart supporter of Luton Town F.C..
