= Drop Dead Festival =

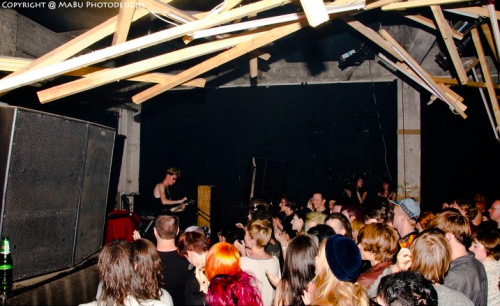
- Drop Dead Festival crowd
- Genre: Punk rock, electronic, experimental
- Locations: New York, New York and Europe with additional smaller events having formerly been held in Los Angeles, Philadelphia, Boston and New Jersey
- Years active: 2003-present
- Founders: NY Decay Productions
- Website: www.dropdeadfestival.org

The Drop Dead Festival is the largest DIY festival for "art-damaged" music. It has as many as 65 bands per event, and has been known to attract attendees from over 30 countries. Drop Dead is an electro, post-punk, electropunk, and experimental multiple-day festival, previously held in New York, New York and Europe with additional smaller events having formerly been held in Los Angeles, Philadelphia, Boston, and New Jersey. The festival is also notable for its elaborate stage designs, bazaar of vendors of scene paraphernalia, movie screenings, and a dancefloor featuring underground DJs from around the world.

== History: USA 2003-2005 ==
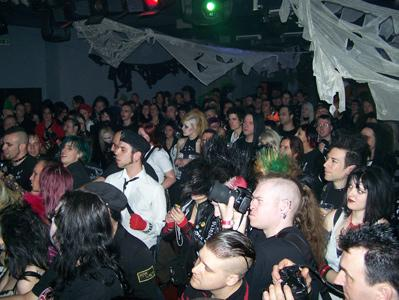
Crowd

The first Drop Dead Festival was held in August 2003, after the success of a series of smaller events put on by NY Decay Productions at the Pyramid in New York City. The festival was originally held at the famous CBGB punk rock club, but subsequent Drop Dead Festivals moved to the much larger Knitting Factory, also in lower Manhattan. Although the main event moved to larger locations, CBGB traditionally held pre-parties and after-parties for the festival until the club closed. In 2005, the Drop Dead Festival grew to four days, during Halloween week. Over 5,000 people attended this event, featuring headliner Nina Hagen.

In 2006 the Drop Dead Festival was held at the Knitting Factory on Labor Day weekend, September 1–3. This was the last regular Drop Dead Festival in the US.

== 2007-2012 ==
Since 2007, Drop Dead has been held in Europe as a traveling festival, including Prague (2007), Portugal (2008), Vilnius, Lithuania (2010), and Berlin (2011, 2012).

== See also ==
- List of electronic music festivals
- List of punk rock festivals
