= Gothic rock =

Genre of rock music

- Other names: Goth rock; goth; positive punk
- Stylistic origins: Post-punk; glam rock
- Cultural origins: Late 1970s, England
- Derivative forms: Ethereal wave; cold wave; dream pop

Subgenres
- Deathrock

Fusion genres
- Gothabilly; gothic country; gothic metal

Local scenes
- Leeds, England

Other topics
- Dark wave; Goth subculture; Gothic fashion; Dark cabaret; New Romantics; Blitz Kids; Industrial music; Shock rock; Horror punk

Gothic rock (also known as goth rock or simply goth) is a subgenre of rock music which grew out of British post-punk in the late 1970s. The genre draws from gothic literature, nihilism, dark romanticism, poetry and tragedy. The style evolved through early post-punk bands such as Siouxsie and the Banshees, Joy Division, Bauhaus, and the Cure, who shifted their music toward darker gothic overtones through an emphasis on minor chords, reverb, dark arrangements, and melancholic melodies.

In 1981, Sounds writer Steve Keaton published an article on "punk gothique", a term coined by UK Decay frontman Steve Abbott to describe their music. By 1983, the NME briefly used "positive punk" to describe a music scene associated with a London club known as the Batcave, which included artists such as Alien Sex Fiend, Specimen, UK Decay, Sex Gang Children, Rubella Ballet and Southern Death Cult. The British press later opted for the term "goth" to define the subculture and style of music, which was further developed by the arrival of the Sisters of Mercy, followed by Flesh for Lulu, Play Dead, Rubella Ballet, Gene Loves Jezebel, Blood and Roses, and Ausgang.

In the United States, 45 Grave and Christian Death further developed the scene, which led to the emergence of deathrock. By the late 1980s and 1990s, gothic rock gave rise to several fusion genres such as gothabilly, gothic country and gothic metal.

== Etymology ==
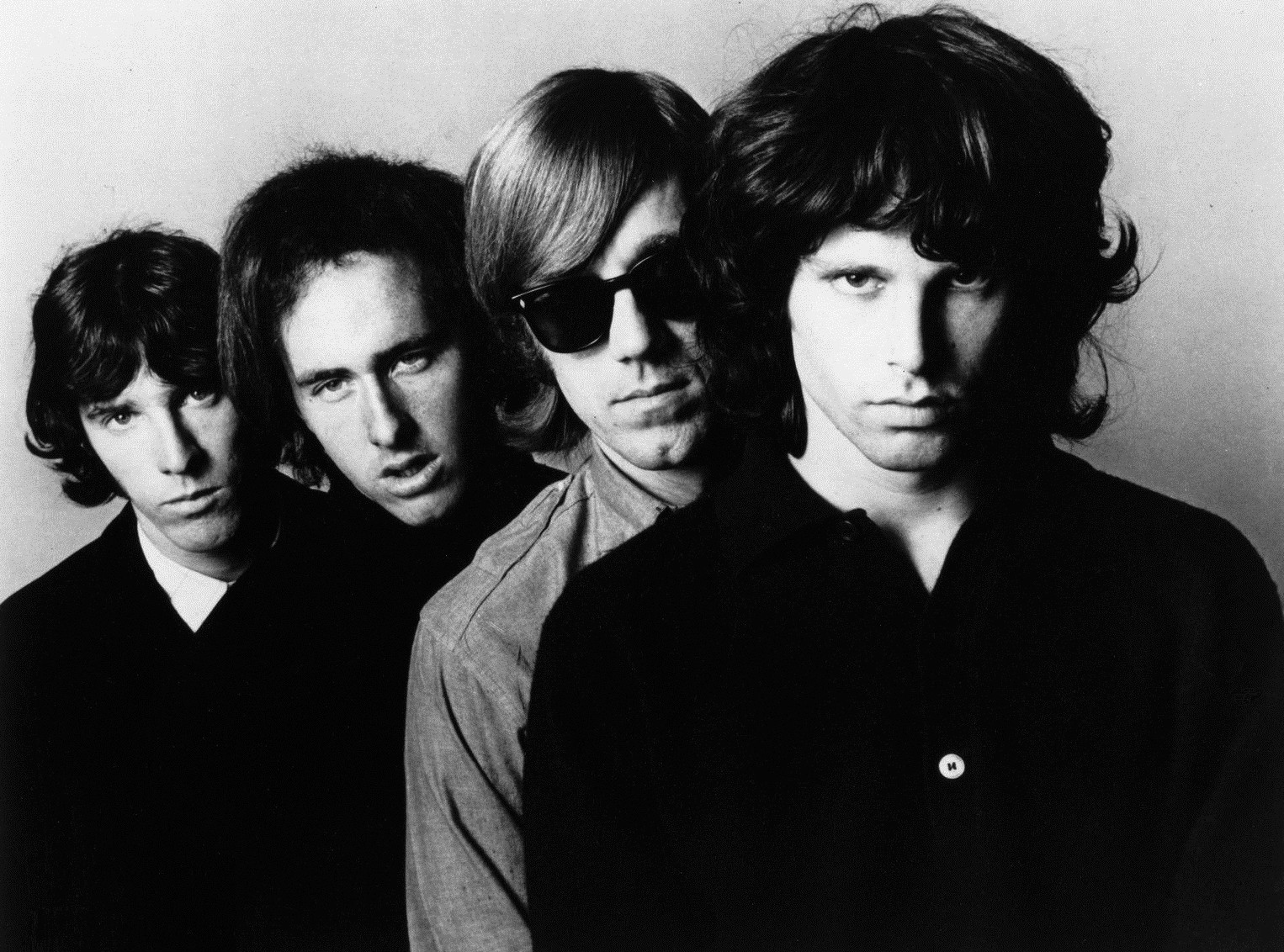
The Doors inspired the coining of the term "gothic rock" and were also an important influence of the genre

The term "gothic rock" was originally coined by critic John Stickney who used the label to describe the music of the Doors in October 1967, in a review published in The Williams Record. Stickney wrote that the band met the journalists "in the gloomy vaulted wine cellar of the Delmonico hotel, the perfect room to honor the gothic rock of the Doors". The author noted that contrary to the "pleasant, amusing hippies", there was "violence" in their music and a dark atmosphere on stage during their concerts. Stickney ultimately titled his article, "Four Doors to the Future: Gothic Rock Is Their Thing".

In April 1977, critic Dave Marsh of The Morning Record described Philip Glass's album North Star as "the best neo-Gothic rock since John Cale and Terry Riley's Church of Anthrax, or more appropriately, the first couple of Doors albums".

On 4 November 1978 Record Mirror's Tim Lott described Pere Ubu's 1975 debut single "30 Seconds Over Tokyo" as "discordant gothic rock". In a review of a Siouxsie and the Banshees' concert in July 1978, critic Nick Kent stated, "parallels and comparisons can now be drawn with gothic rock architects like the Doors and, certainly, early Velvet Underground". In 1980, Joy Division's album Closer was noted for its "dark strokes of gothic rock" by Sounds.

== Characteristics ==
According to music journalist Simon Reynolds, standard musical fixtures of gothic rock include "scything guitar patterns, high-pitched basslines that often usurped the melodic role [and] beats that were either hypnotically dirgelike or tom-tom heavy and 'tribal'". Reynolds described the vocal style as consisting of "deep, droning alloys of Jim Morrison and Leonard Cohen". Several acts used drum machines downplaying the rhythm's backbeat.

Gothic rock typically deals with dark themes addressed through lyrics and the music's atmosphere. The poetic sensibilities of the genre led gothic rock lyrics to exhibit literary romanticism, morbidity, existentialism, religious symbolism, or supernatural mysticism. Gothic rock is an offshoot of post-punk. According to AllMusic, the genre "took the cold synthesizers and processed guitars of post-punk and used them to construct foreboding, sorrowful, often epic soundscapes." Early gothic rock had introspective or personal lyrics, but according to AllMusic, "its poetic sensibilities soon led to a taste for literary romanticism, morbidity, religious symbolism, and/or supernatural mysticism."

Gothic rock creates a dark atmosphere by drawing influence from the drones used by the Velvet Underground, and many gothic singers are influenced by the "deep and dramatic" vocal timbre of David Bowie, albeit singing at even lower pitches.

In terms of fashion, gothic bands incorporated influences from 19th-century Gothic literature along with horror films and, to a lesser extent, the BDSM culture. Gothic fashions within the subculture range from deathrock, punk, androgynous, Victorian, to Renaissance and medieval-style attire, or combinations of the above, most often with black clothing, makeup and hair. Backcombed hair was popular among gothic fans in the 1980s.

== History ==
=== 1950s–1970s: Forerunners ===
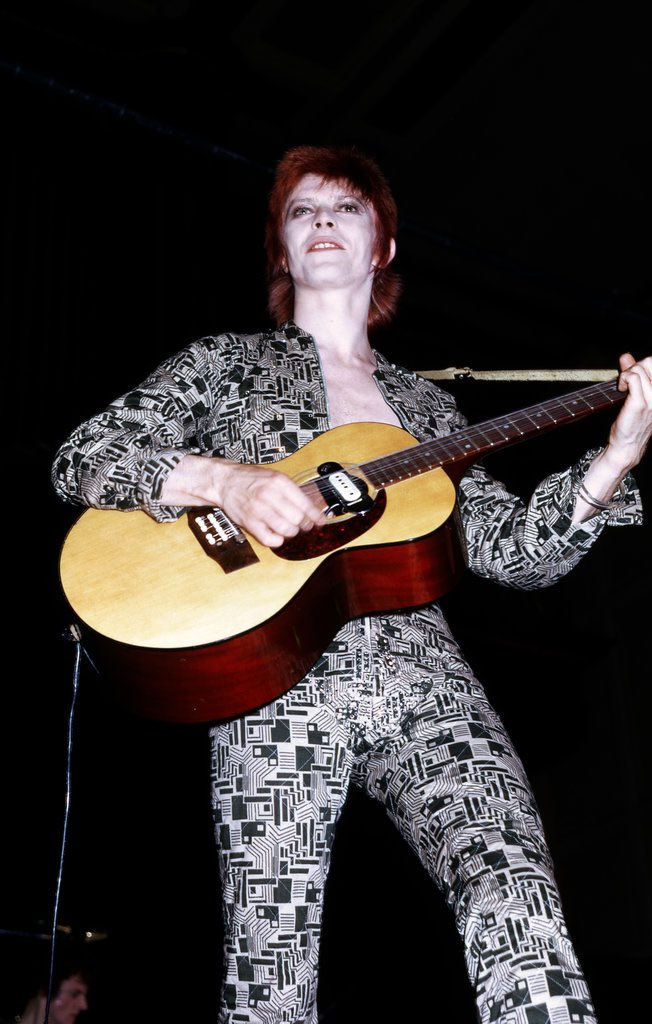
David Bowie influenced the post-punk bands that helped spawn the gothic rock genre

During the late 1960s and early 1970s, several musicians became influential in shaping the aesthetics and musical conventions of gothic rock such as Marc Bolan, Lou Reed and the Velvet Underground, Jim Morrison and the Doors, David Bowie, Brian Eno, and Iggy Pop and the Stooges.

Journalist Kurt Loder would write retrospectively that the song "All Tomorrow's Parties" by the Velvet Underground and Nico is a "mesmerizing gothic-rock masterpiece" while Rolling Stone claimed their song "Venus in Furs" made the band "goth pioneers". Nico's 1968 album The Marble Index has been described by Alternative Press as "the first truly gothic album". With its stark sound, somber lyrics, and dark visual aesthetic. However, music journalist Simon Reynolds considers shock rock artist Alice Cooper as "the true ungodly godfather of goth" due to his "theatrics and black humor", that was inspired by the sound and visual aesthetic of Arthur Brown. Screamin' Jay Hawkins' early style of shock rock, which blended occult imagery and theatricality with rock and roll, as exemplified in his 1956 track "I Put a Spell on You", has also been retroactively recognized as a forerunner to gothic music.

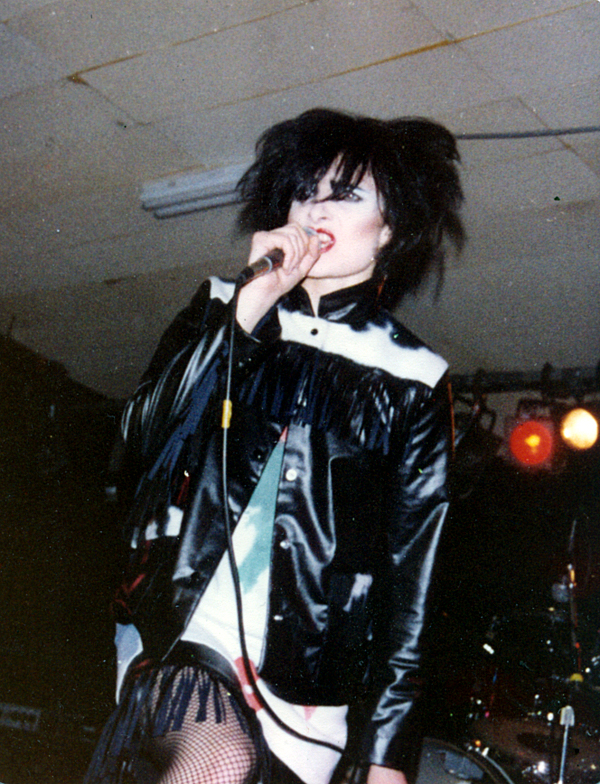
Siouxsie and the Banshees were one of the first British bands to play a post-punk music with gothic overtones; Siouxsie Sioux pictured in November 1980

In the late 1970s, the word "gothic" was used to describe the atmosphere of post-punk bands like Siouxsie and the Banshees, Magazine and Joy Division. In March 1979, Kent used the gothic adjective in his review of Magazine's second album, Secondhand Daylight. Kent noted that there was "a new austere sense of authority" to their music, with a "dank neo-Gothic sound". The second Siouxsie and the Banshees album, also released in 1979, was a precursor in several aspects. The Guardian's Alexis Petridis retrospectively stated, "A lot of musical signifiers of classic gothic rock - scything, effects-laden guitar, pounding tribal drums – are audible, on [...] Join Hands". In September, Joy Division's manager Tony Wilson described their music as "gothic" on the television show Something Else, and their producer Martin Hannett described their style as "dancing music with gothic overtones".

In 1980, Melody Maker wrote that "Joy Division are masters of this gothic gloom". In 1983, The Face's Paul Rambali recalled that there were "several strong Gothic characteristics" in the music of Joy Division. In 1984, Joy Division's bassist Peter Hook named Play Dead as one of their heirs: "If you listen to a band like Play Dead, who I really like, Joy Division played the same stuff that Play Dead are playing. They're similar."

English punk rock band the Damned have been cited as an influence on and forerunner to gothic rock, in both music and aesthetics; their later musical style began shifting to goth, particularly on their 1985 album Phantasmagoria.

Retrospectively, Pitchfork described glam rock as having a pivotal influence of the development of the gothic rock genre, stating, "Although it abandoned the psychedelic color palette and exchanged alien worship for a vampire cult, goth kept glam's theatricality intact, as well as its openness to experimentation", adding that early glam and art rock musician Brian Eno "may have contributed more to goth's sonic DNA" than David Bowie, regarding the 1974 track "Third Uncle" as a "proto-goth" song.

=== 1980s: Origins ===
==== United Kingdom ====
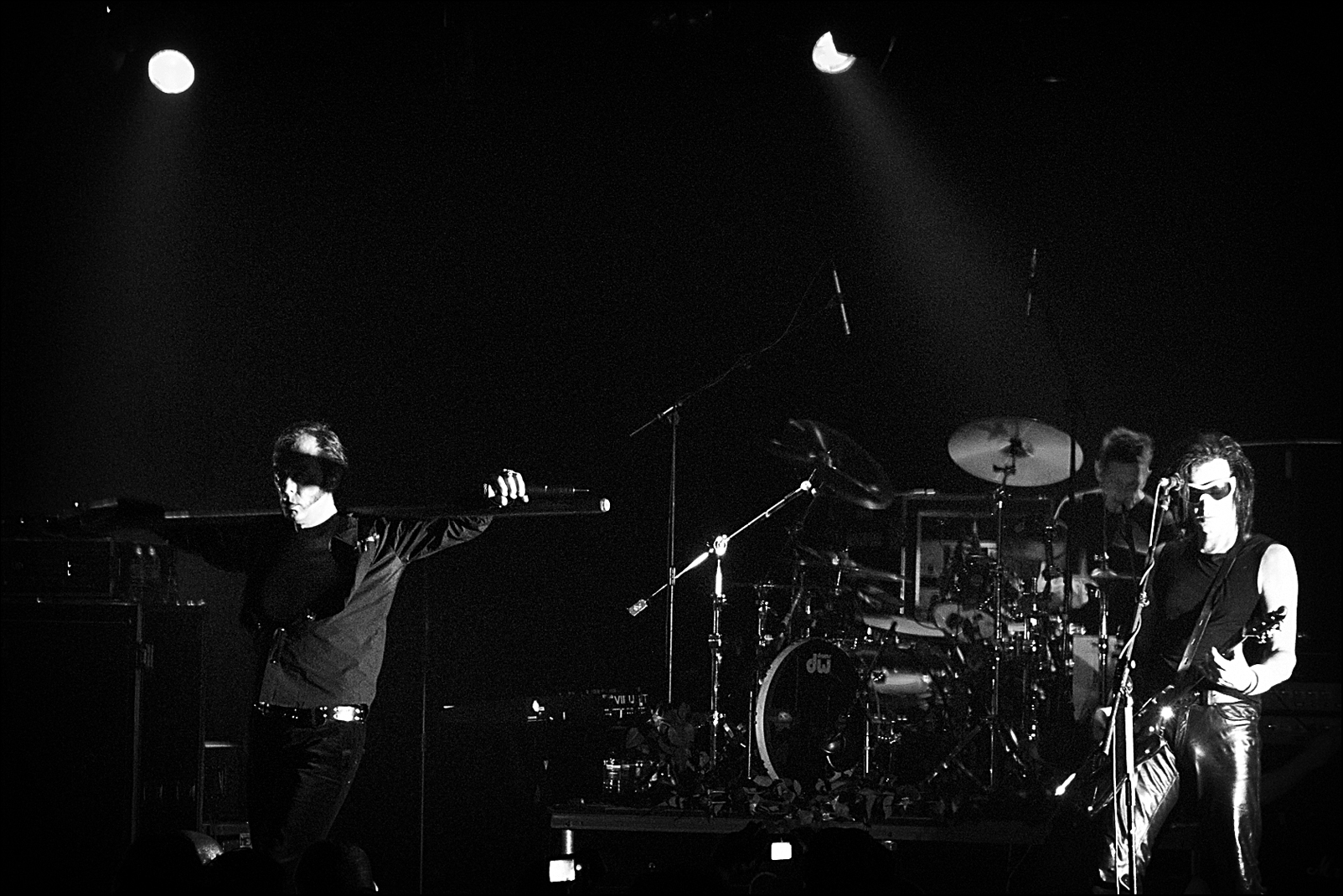
Gothic rock band Bauhaus performing live in August 2006

Not long after, the "gothic" label "became a critical term of abuse" for a band like Bauhaus, who had arrived on the music scene in 1979. At the time, NME considered that "Siouxsie and the Banshees, Adam and the Ants and even... Joy Division" had opened up "a potentially massive market" for newcomers like Bauhaus and Killing Joke: journalist Andy Gill then separated these bands, pointing out that there was a difference "between art and artifice".

However, Bauhaus's debut single, "Bela Lugosi's Dead", released in late 1979, was retrospectively considered to be the beginning of the gothic rock genre. According to Peter Murphy, the song was written to be tongue-in-cheek, but since the group performed it with "naive seriousness", that is how the audience understood it. Bauhaus released their debut album In the Flat Field in 1980, and the album is often considered the first gothic rock album.

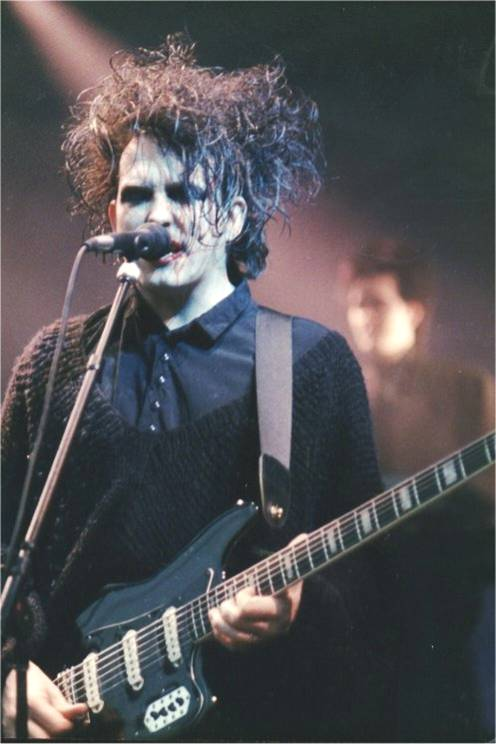
Robert Smith of the Cure in 1989, who was on the front cover of NME Originals: Goth in 2004.

In the early 1980s, post-punk bands such as Siouxsie and the Banshees and the Cure included more gothic characteristics in their music. According to Reynolds, with their fourth album, 1981's Juju, the Banshees included several gothic qualities, lyrically and sonically, whereas according to The Guardian, Juju was art rock on certain album tracks and pop on the singles. Their bassist, Steven Severin, attributed the aesthetic used by the Banshees around that time to the influence of the Cramps. The Cure's "oppressively dispirited" trio of albums, Seventeen Seconds (1980), Faith (1981) and Pornography (1982), cemented that group's stature in the genre. The line "It doesn't matter if we all die" began the Pornography album, which is considered as "the Cure's gothic piece de resistance". They would later become the most commercially successful of these groups. The Cure's style was "withdrawn", contrasting with their contemporaries like Nick Cave's the Birthday Party, who drew on blues and violent turmoil. With the Birthday Party's Junkyard album, Nick Cave combined "sacred and profane" things, using Old Testament imagery with stories about sin, curses and damnation. Their 1981 single "Release the Bats" was particularly influential in the scene.

Killing Joke were originally inspired by Public Image Ltd., borrowing from funk, disco, dub and, later, heavy metal. Calling their style "tension music", Killing Joke distorted these elements to provocative effect, as well as producing a morbid, politically charged visual style. Reynolds identified the Birthday Party and Killing Joke as essential proto-goth groups. Despite their legacy as progenitors of gothic rock, those groups disliked the label. Adam Ant's early work was also a major impetus for the gothic rock scene, and much of the fanbase came from his milieu. Other early contributors to the scene included UK Decay and Ireland's Virgin Prunes.

==== Expansion of the scene ====
In February 1981, Sounds writer Steve Keaton published an article on "punk gothique", entitled "The Face of Punk Gothique", a term coined by UK Decay frontman Steve Abbott to describe their music. In the article, Keaton stated, "Could this be the coming of Punk Gothique? With Bauhaus flying in on similar wings could it be the next big thing?" Writer Cathi Unsworth believes that Abbott was the first to ascribe the term "goth" to the music and subculture with which it would come to be associated, citing an interview in May 1981 where he once again used the term "punk gothique".

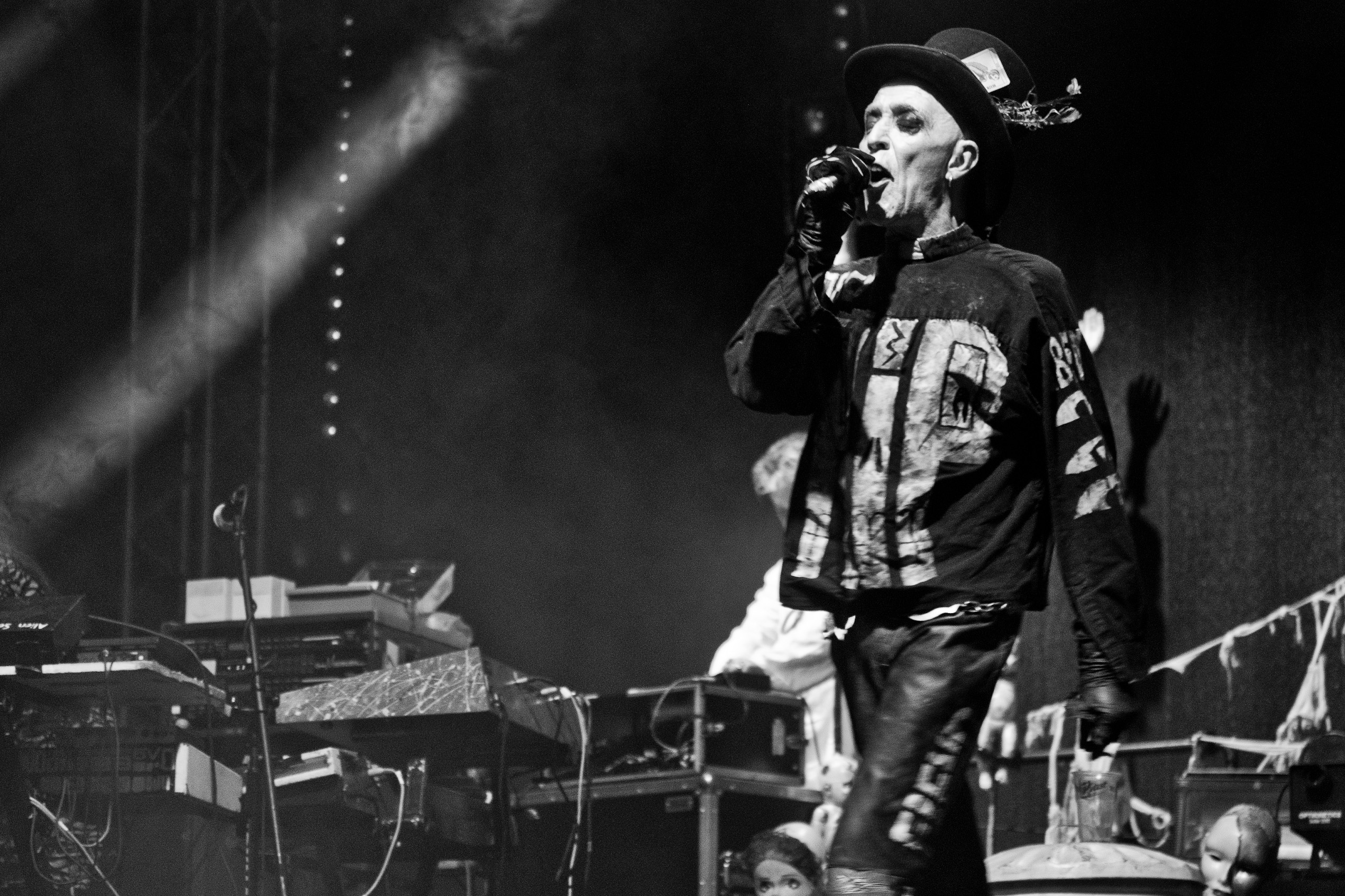
Alien Sex Fiend were originally described as "positive punk" and associated with the Batcave club

Gothic rock would not be adopted as "positive identity, a tribal rallying cry" until a shift in the scene in winter 1982-83. In London, the Batcave club had opened on 21 July 1982: it became a venue for the emerging scene and subculture. Bands like Specimen performed many concerts there. That same year, Ian Astbury of the band Southern Death Cult used the term "gothic goblins" to describe Sex Gang Children's fans. Southern Death Cult became icons of the scene, drawing aesthetic inspiration from Native American culture and appearing on the cover of NME in October.

On 19 February 1983, the emerging scene was described as "positive punk" on the front cover of NME, in an article titled "Punk Warriors" by music journalist Richard North. The article described groups such as Bauhaus, Theatre of Hate and UK Decay as part of the movement. Other associated acts were Alien Sex Fiend, the Mob, Rubella Ballet, Sex Gang Children and Southern Death Cult. On 14 June 1983, BBC radio DJ John Peel noted that the NME had dropped the term "positive punk" and had now opted for "goth" to describe the emerging subculture. That year, myriad goth groups emerged, including Flesh for Lulu, Play Dead, Rubella Ballet, Gene Loves Jezebel, Blood and Roses, and Ausgang.

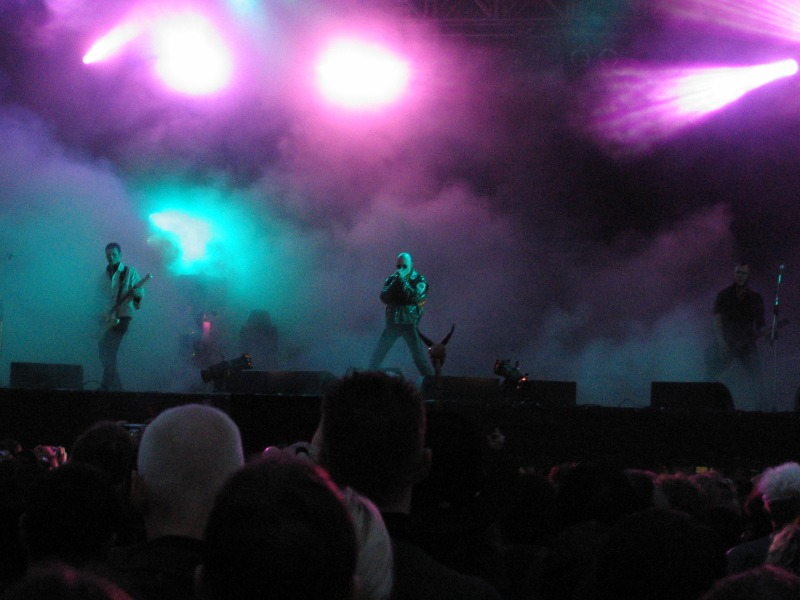
The Sisters of Mercy performing at the M'era Luna Festival in 2005.

Reynolds cited the shift between gothic music to traditional gothic rock or goth rock being primarily influenced by the Leeds band, the Sisters of Mercy. As journalist Jennifer Park put it, "The original blueprint for gothic rock had mutated significantly. Doom and gloom was no longer confined to its characteristic atmospherics, but as the Sisters demonstrated, it could really rock". The Sisters of Mercy, who cited influences such as Leonard Cohen, Gary Glitter, Motörhead, the Stooges, the Velvet Underground, the Birthday Party, Suicide, and the Fall, created a new, harder form of gothic rock. In addition, they incorporated a drum machine. Reynolds identified their 1983 single "Temple of Love" as the quintessential goth anthem of the year, along with Southern Death Cult's "Fatman". The group created their own record label, Merciful Release, which also signed the March Violets, who performed in a similar style. According to Reynolds, the March Violets "imitated Joy Division sonically". Another band, the Danse Society was particularly inspired by the Cure's Pornography period. The 4AD label released music in a more ethereal style, by groups such as Cocteau Twins, Dead Can Dance, and Xmal Deutschland.

"Moonchild", a late 1980s gothic song by Fields of the Nephilim with a more guttural baritone vocal style

Later stages of Gothic Rock in the UK came with a shift in sound and commercial success. Southern Death Cult reformed as the Cult, a more conventional hard rock group. Bauhaus members reformed as the psychedelia-influenced Love and Rockets achieving both critical and commercial success during the late 1980s and '90s. In their wake, the Mission, which included two former members of the Sisters of Mercy (Wayne Hussey and Craig Adams), achieved commercial success in the mid-1980s to early 1990s, as did Fields of the Nephilim and All About Eve. European groups inspired by gothic rock also proliferated, including Clan of Xymox. Other bands associated with the genre included All Living Fear, And Also the Trees, Balaam and the Angel, Claytown Troupe, Dream Disciples, Feeding Fingers, Inkubus Sukkubus, Libitina, Miranda Sex Garden, Nosferatu, Rosetta Stone, and Suspiria.

Record labels like Factory, 4AD and Beggars Banquet released much of this music in Europe, and through a vibrant import music market in the US, the subculture grew, especially in New York and Los Angeles, California, where many nightclubs featured "gothic/industrial" nights and bands like Black Tape for a Blue Girl, Theatre of Ice, Human Drama and The Wake became key figures for the genre to expand on a nationwide level.

===== United States =====
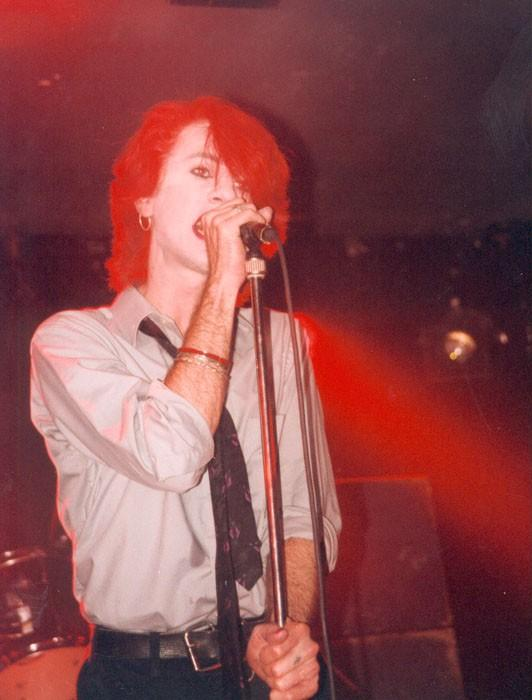
Rozz Williams of Christian Death

American gothic rock began with Californian bands such as 45 Grave and Christian Death, whose harder, more punk rock-influenced style of gothic rock became known as deathrock. Christian Death combined "self-consciously controversial tactics" with Los Angeles punk and heavy metal influences. Their singer Rozz Williams committed suicide by hanging in 1998 at age 34. 45 Grave was more inspired by heavy metal than Christian Death and featured female singer Dinah Cancer. Some punk acts like the Cramps, the Gun Club, Lydia Lunch, the Nuns, the Misfits and T.S.O.L. have been credited to be influential on both the sound and the aesthetics of the Goth subculture in America, being subsequently credited to be pioneers in contemporaneous goth-related styles such as "deathrock", "horror punk", "gothabilly" and "goth punk". Notable 1980s American goth bands include Super Heroines, Human Drama, the Wake and Kommunity FK.

=== 1990s–2000s ===
The 1990s saw a resurgence of the goth subculture, fueled largely by crossover from the industrial music, electronic and metal scenes; and goth culture and aesthetic again worked itself into the mainstream consciousness, inspiring thriving goth music scenes in most cities and notoriety throughout popular culture as well as new goth-centric U.S. record labels such as Cleopatra Records, among others. The Guardian's Dave Simpson stated, "[I]n the 90s, goths all but disappeared as dance music became the dominant youth cult". As a result, the goth movement went underground and fractured into cyber goth, shock rock, industrial metal, gothic metal, and Medieval folk metal.

At the time, gothic metal fused "the bleak, icy atmospherics of goth rock with the loud guitars and aggression of heavy metal." Marilyn Manson was seen as a "goth-shock icon" by Spin, and combined "atmosphere from goth and disco" with "industrial sound". "Undercore", a short-lived movement identified with the bands Deadsy, Orgy and Videodrone, synthesized glam, goth and synth-rock with science fiction. In the 2000s, critics regularly noticed the influence of goth on bands of that time period. English band The Horrors mixed 1960s garage rock with 1980s goth. When referencing female singer Zola Jesus, writers questioned if she announced the second coming of the genre as her music was described with this term.

=== 2010s–2020s ===
Contemporary goth and darkwave acts include Creux Lies, Twin Tribes, She Past Away, Drab Majesty, A Cloud of Ravens, Kælan Mikla, Lebanon Hanover, and Night Club.

== Legacy ==
In the 1990s, several acts such as PJ Harvey, Manic Street Preachers, Nine Inch Nails and the Smashing Pumpkins included gothic characteristics in their music. According to Rolling Stone, PJ Harvey's music in 1993 "careens from blues to goth to grunge, often in the space of a single song". In 1997, Spin qualified Portishead's second album as "gothic", "deadly" and "trippy". Critic Barry Walters observed that the group got "darker, deeper and more disturbing" in comparison to their debut album Dummy. In the late 2010s, the Twilight Sad included gothic elements in their music.

== See also ==
- List of gothic rock bands
- List of gothic festivals
- Goth subculture
- Gothic fashion

== Bibliography ==
=== Books ===
- Charlton, Katherine (2003). Rock Music Styles (Fourth ed.). McGraw-Hill. ISBN 0-07-249555-3.
- Goodlad, L. M. E.; Bibby, M. (2007). Goth: Undead Subculture. Duke University Press. ISBN 978-0-8223-3921-2.
- van Elferen, Isabella (2009). Nostalgia Or Perversion? Gothic Rewriting from the Eighteenth Century Until the Present Day. Ebook. ISBN 978-1282191198.
- van Elferen, Isabella (2012). Gothic Music: The Sounds of the Uncanny. University of Wales Press. ISBN 9780708325186.
- Greene, James Jr. (2013). This Music Leaves Stains: The Complete Story of the Misfits. Scarecrow Press. ISBN 9780810884380.
- Hannaham, James (1999). "Bela Lugosi's Dead and I Don't Feel So Good Either". Stars Don't Stand Still in the Sky: Music and Myth. NYU Press. pp. 78–87. ISBN 0-8147-4727-2.
- Kilpatrick, Nancy (2004). The Goth Bible: A Compendium for the Darkly Inclined. New York: St. Martin's Griffin. ISBN 0-312-30696-2.
- Melton, J. G. (1994). The Vampire Book: The Encyclopedia of the Undead. Visible Ink Press. ISBN 0-8223-3921-8.
- Mercer, Mick (1993). Gothic Rock. Los Angeles: Cleopatra Records. ISBN 0-9636193-1-4.
- Mercer, Mick (1988). Gothic Rock Black Book. London: Omnibus Press. ISBN 0-7119-1546-6.
- Mercer, Mick (1996). The Hex Files: The Goth Bible. Woodstock: Overlook Press. ISBN 0-87951-783-2.
- Partridge, Christopher (2015). Mortality and Music: Popular Music and Awareness of Death. Bloomsbury Publishing. ISBN 9781472526809.
- Reynolds, Simon (2005). "Chapter 22: 'Dark Things: Goth and the Return of Rock'". Rip It Up and Start Again: Postpunk 1978–1984. London: Faber and Faber. ISBN 0-571-21569-6.
- Robb, John (2023). The Art of Darkness : The History Of Goth. Louder Than War Books. ISBN 978-1-914424-86-1
- Sinclair, Mick (2013). Adjusting The Stars: Music journalism from post-punk London. Kindle edition, B00FG9JGVE.
- Steele, Valerie; Park, Jennifer (21 October 2008). Gothic: Dark Glamour. Yale University Press. ISBN 978-0300136944.
- Thompson, Dave (2002). The Dark Reign of Gothic Rock. Helter Skelter. ISBN 9781900924481.
- Unsworth, Cathi (2023). Season of the Witch: The Book of Goth. Nine Eight Books. ISBN 978-1788706247

=== Journals ===
- Collins, Andrew (30 November 1991). "Bluffer's Guide to Goth". NME.
