= Hollywood Vampires (disambiguation) =

The Hollywood Vampires was a celebrity drinking club active in the 1970s.

Hollywood Vampires may also refer to:

- Hollywood Vampires (band), a supergroup formed to honor the club
  - Hollywood Vampires (Hollywood Vampires album), the group's debut album
- Hollywood Vampires (L.A. Guns album)
