= Hidden City (album) =

Studio album by The Cult
- Released: 5 February 2016
- Recorded: 2014–2015
- Genres: Hard rock; gothic rock
- Length: 52:26
- Labels: Cooking Vinyl, Dine Alone
- Producer: Bob Rock

The Cult chronology
Choice of Weapon (2012)	Hidden City (2016)	Under the Midnight Sun (2022)

Singles from Hidden City
- 1. "Dark Energy" Released: 6 November 2015; 2. "Hinterland" Released: 12 January 2016

Hidden City is the tenth studio album by the British rock band The Cult, released on 5 February 2016 through Cooking Vinyl and Dine Alone Records. It is the final part of a trilogy that began with Born into This (2007), and The Cult's first album since their 1994 self-titled album not to feature bassist Chris Wyse; the role was filled by producer Bob Rock and Chris Chaney (Jane's Addiction). It is also their final album with drummer John Tempesta.

== Reception ==
Professional ratings
Aggregate scores
Source	Rating
Metacritic	68/100
Review scores
Source	Rating
AllMusic	3/5 stars
Classic Rock	8/10
Drowned in Sound	7/10
Exclaim!	7/10
The Guardian	4/5 stars
The Irish Times	3/5 stars
laut.de	1/5 stars
The National	3/5 stars
Record Collector	3/5 stars
The Spill Magazine	3.5/5 stars

Hidden City has received generally mixed to positive reviews from critics. AllMusic writer Thom Jurek gave the album three out of five stars, saying that it "touches on almost every period in their history." He continued his review, stating that "Billy Duffy's signature boogie-matic post-Electric riffing struts out in front of drummer John Tempesta's hard-swinging snare and thumping tom-tom vamp. Ian Astbury's baritone remains a tremendous thundering force, authoritatively delivering a typically messy lyric swamp of Tibetan Buddhist mysticism and Native American spirituality that warns of coming karmic consequences for exploitative and destructive behavior. Rock's wildly busy, over the top production swirls around it all." Dom Gourlay writing for Drowned in Sound stated, "despite being active on and off for the best part of 33 years, their creative flame still burns brightly if tenth studio album Hidden City is anything to go by... More importantly, Hidden City slides succinctly into the upper echelons of the band's impressive canon, and that is no mean feat." Exclaim!'s Jibril Yassin wrote, "On the Cult's tenth studio album, Hidden City, the long-running British act seem to have hit a new creative streak. Hidden City is the band's third album in recent years, and it's chock full of call-backs to various points in their career..."

Lauren Murphy in her review of The Irish Times commented, "Atmosphere comes at the expense of innovation, but Hidden City is certainly a listenable collection, if perhaps only one for established fans who already know exactly what to expect." A reviewer of The National commented, "The Cult have had their ups and downs through their 30-year career. Hidden City shows the band climbing new heights." A reviewer of The Press wrote, "The Cult's tenth studio album finds them delivering a powerful mix of the brutal and the beautiful, the spiritual and the reflective." Dave Simpson writing for The Guardian mentioned, "The reinventions aren’t as dramatic now, but they’re still not standing still. Their 10th album darts from brooding postpunk to old-fashioned heavy metal and back again. At the heart is still the curious chemistry between gruff-toned, cosmically inclined singer Ian Astbury and his polar opposite, down-to-earth Mancunian guitarist Billy Duffy, the Cult’s own human riff."

=== Accolades ===
Publication	Accolade	Year	Rank
Mojo	The 50 Best Albums of 2016	2016	15

== Track listing ==
No.	Title	Length
1.	"Dark Energy"	4:28
2.	"No Love Lost"	3:13
3.	"Dance the Night"	4:15
4.	"In Blood"	4:48
5.	"Birds of Paradise"	6:26
6.	"Hinterland"	5:06
7.	"G O A T"	3:18
8.	"Deeply Ordered Chaos"	4:32
9.	"Avalanche of Light"	4:31
10.	"Lilies"	4:16
11.	"Heathens"	3:39
12.	"Sound and Fury"	3:54
Total length:		52:26

== Music videos ==
1. "G O A T" – Dir: Juan Azulay
2. "Hinterland" – Dir: Juan Azulay
3. "Deeply Ordered Chaos" – Dir: Juan Azulay
4. "Dark Energy" – Dir: Juan Azulay

== Personnel ==
The Cult

- Ian Astbury – vocals, tambourine, etc. & additional guitars
- Billy Duffy – guitars
- John Tempesta – drums

Additional personnel

- Chris Chaney – bass
- Bob Rock – bass on "Dance the Night", "Birds of Paradise" and "Deeply Ordered Chaos", and additional guitars
- Jamie Muhoberac – piano, keyboards
- Dan Chase – additional drums on "Sound and Fury"

Technical

- Ted Jensen – mastering engineer

== Note ==
Just prior to this album's release, Damon Fox (keyboards) and Grant Fitzpatrick (bassist) were made full-time members of the band. However, they made no contributions to this album.

== Charts ==
Chart (2016)	Peak position
Australian Albums (ARIA)	42
Austrian Albums (Ö3 Austria)	69
Belgian Albums (Ultratop Flanders)	83
Belgian Albums (Ultratop Wallonia)	71
Canadian Albums (Billboard)	80
Dutch Albums (Album Top 100)	36
French Albums (SNEP)	143
German Albums (Offizielle Top 100)	51
Italian Albums (FIMI)	66
Portuguese Albums (AFP)	41
Scottish Albums (Official Charts)	16
Spanish Albums (Promusicae)	41
Swiss Albums (Schweizer Hitparade)	50
UK Albums (Official Charts)	19
UK Album Downloads (Official Charts)	31
UK Independent Albums (Official Charts)	2
UK Rock & Metal Albums (Official Charts)	1
US Billboard 200	153
US Independent Albums (Billboard)	6
US Top Album Sales (Billboard)	68
US Top Alternative Albums (Billboard)	16
US Top Rock Albums (Billboard)	13
