= Tommy Denander =

Swedish musician

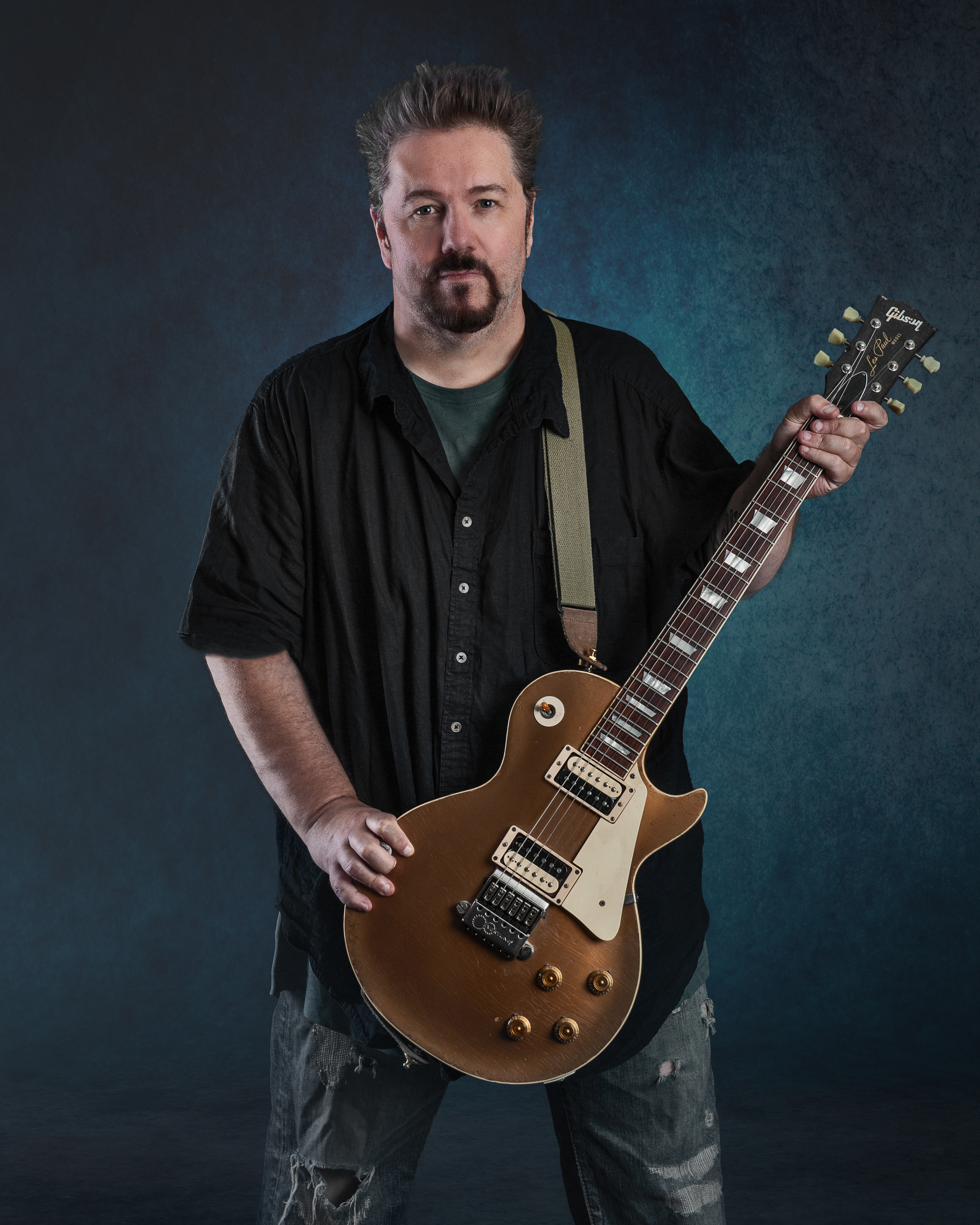
- Denander in 2025

Background information
- Born: Stockholm, Sweden
- Occupations: Musician, songwriter
- Instruments: Guitar, keyboards
- Label: Frontiers Records

Tommy Denander (born in Stockholm, Sweden) is a Swedish guitarist, songwriter and record producer. He is mostly known for his role in the AOR project Radioactive, signed to Frontiers Records.

The 2022 Radioactive album, X.X.X featured guests including Robin McAuley, Robbie LaBlanc, Jerome Mazza, Clif Magness, Mutt Lange and Andreas Carlsson.

Denander has worked with artists including Michael Jackson, Paul Stanley, Alice Cooper (including original members Neal Smith, Dennis Dunaway, Michael Bruce, plus Steve Hunter and Dick Wagner), Deep Purple, Anastacia, Ricky Martin, Hollywood Vampires, Rob Thomas, Jeff Beck, Peter Cetera, Richard Marx, Rob Zombie, Vince Gill, Ke$ha, Steve Perry, Ace Frehley, Peter Frampton, Tokio Hotel and many more. Producers include Robert "Mutt" Lange, David Foster, Max Martin, Eddie Kramer, Bob Ezrin, Desmond Child, Humberto Gatica, Bob Clearmountain, Denniz Pop, and Chris Lord-Alge.

He is the founder of Legends Of Rock, a project that featured rock singers including Bobby Kimball, Jimi Jamison, Joe Lynn Turner, Tony Martin, Graham Bonnet, Mickey Thomas, Fergie Frederiksen, Steve Augeri, and Eric Martin.

His signature VGS guitar features both the Evertune bridge and True Temperament frets.

Together with Bob Ezrin he co-produced and co-wrote Alice Cooper's album, Paranormal, that was released on July 28, 2017. Denander played most of the guitars on the album. Denander also worked on Alice Cooper's Detroit Stories as co-writer, co-producer and musician.

He co-wrote and played on the song "Welcome To Bushwackers", that featured Jeff Beck on lead guitar, plus Denander played on the song "Mr Spider" on the Hollywood Vampires album, Rise (2019).
