= We Wish You a Metal Xmas and a Headbanging New Year =

- United States cover

Studio album by various artists
- Released: October 14, 2008
- Genre: Heavy metal, Hard rock, Christmas
- Length: 67:30
- Label: Armoury
- Producer: Bob Kulick & Brett Chassen

Alternative Cover
- International Cover

We Wish You a Metal Xmas and a Headbanging New Year is an album of Christmas songs played by an all-star collection of hard rock and heavy metal artists released on October 14, 2008. Each track puts together a unique supergroup playing a traditional Christmas selection.

== Track listing ==
1. "We Wish You a Merry Xmas"
  (Jeff Scott Soto / Bruce Kulick / Bob Kulick / Chris Wyse / Ray Luzier)
2. "Run Rudolph Run"
  (Ian "Lemmy" Kilmister / Billy Gibbons / Dave Grohl )
3. "Santa Claws Is Coming to Town"
  (Alice Cooper / John 5 / Billy Sheehan / Vinny Appice )
4. "God Rest You Merry, Gentlemen"
  (Ronnie James Dio / Tony Iommi / Rudy Sarzo / Simon Wright)
5. "Silver Bells"
  (Geoff Tate / Carlos Cavazo / James Lomenzo / Ray Luzier)
6. "Little Drummer Boy"
  (Doug Pinnick / George Lynch / Billy Sheehan / Simon Phillips)
7. "Santa Claus Is Back in Town"
  (Tim "Ripper" Owens / Steve Morse / Juan Garcia / Marco Mendoza / Vinny Appice)
8. "Silent Night"
  (Chuck Billy / Scott Ian / Jon Donais / Chris Wyse / John Tempesta)
9. "Deck the Halls"
  (Oni Logan / Craig Goldy / Tony Franklin / John Tempesta)
10. "Grandma Got Ran Over By A Reindeer"
  (Stephen Pearcy / Tracii Guns / Bob Kulick / Billy Sheehan / Greg Bissonette)
11. "Rockin' Around the Xmas Tree"
  (Joe Lynn Turner / Bruce Kulick / Bob Kulick / Rudy Sarzo / Simon Wright)
12. "Happy Xmas (War Is Over)"
  (Tommy Shaw / Steve Lukather / Marco Mendoza / Kenny Aronoff)

Bonus tracks:

1. "O Tannenbaum (O Christmas Tree)"
  (Doro Pesch / Frankie Banali / Michael Schenker / Tony Franklin)
2. "Auld Lang Syne"
  (Girlschool)
3. "Frosty the Snowman"
  (Bumblefoot / Chris Chaney / Kenny Aronoff / Steve "Lips" Kudlow)
4. "Rudolph the Red-Nosed Reindeer"
  (Dez Fafara / Blasko / Doug Aldrich / John Tempesta)

== Personnel ==
- Mike Exeter – Engineer
- Bob Kulick - Producer
- Brett Chassen - Producer
