= A Cure for Serpents =

- First English-language edition
- Author: Alberto Denti di Pirajno
- Translator: Kathleen Naylor
- Language: Italian
- Genre: Travel
- Publisher: Andre Deutsch
- Publication date: 1955
- English publication date: 1955

A Cure for Serpents: A Doctor in Africa is a 1955 travel book by Alberto Denti di Pirajno, later the Duke of Pirajno, an Italian doctor, writer and former colonial governor of Tripoli. Set in Libya, Ethiopia and Somalia, the book is a collection of anecdotes about various places he visited in his work as a physician in North Africa in the 1920s and the people he met, which includes tribal chieftains, Berber princes, courtesans and Tuareg tribesmen and of a lioness, which became part pet and part guard. The book was translated into English in the same year by Kathleen Naylor. It was republished by Eland in 2005, with an Afterword by Dervla Murphy.
