= Legends – voices of rock =

Constellation

Legends – voices of rock is a constellation where several legendary lead singers perform their biggest hits.

Constellation varies, included artists are Grammy award-winning and platinum selling stars like Bobby Kimball (original lead singer of Toto), Steve Augeri (ex Journey), Joe Lynn Turner (ex Rainbow, Deep Purple), Bill Champlin (formerly of Chicago), Fergie Frederiksen (ex Toto), Bruce Kulick (ex Kiss), Robin Beck and more.

First Legends tour was Japan, June 2012, with shows in Nagoya, Osaka and Tokyo.

The Legends project was presented to the Swedish audience live on national TV4.

Behind the project are the two well-known Swedish guitar players, Tommy Denander and Sayit Dölen. Tommy Denander is a Grammy award nominated world-famous guitarist. He has played on more than 3000 albums. Sayit Dölen has a long career of studio and live work with stars like Enrique Iglesias, Yngwie Malmsteen, Jimi Jamison, Bobby Kimball, Katie Melua and many more.

Top musicians are handpicked for the Legends band in a serious effort to play the hits true to the originals.
