= Rise (Hollywood Vampires album) =

Studio album by Hollywood Vampires
- Released: June 21, 2019
- Length: 56:37
- Label: EarMusic
- Producer: Tommy Henriksen

Hollywood Vampires chronology
Hollywood Vampires (2015)	Rise (2019)

Singles from Rise
- 1. "Who's Laughing Now" Released: April 18, 2019

Professional ratings
Aggregate scores
Source	Rating
Metacritic	57/100
Review scores
Source	Rating
AllMusic	2/5 stars
Rolling Stone	3/5 stars

Rise is the second studio album by American supergroup Hollywood Vampires, consisting of Alice Cooper, Johnny Depp and Joe Perry. It was released on June 21, 2019, on EarMusic.

== Recording ==
The album consists of 13 tracks of original material, plus covers of David Bowie's ""Heroes"", Johnny Thunders' "You Can't Put Your Arms Around a Memory", and The Jim Carroll Band's "People Who Died".

English guitarist Jeff Beck features on the song "Welcome to Bushwackers".

== Critical reception ==
At Metacritic, which assigns a weighted average rating out of 100 to reviews from mainstream publications, this release received an average score of 57, based on 7 reviews, indicating "mixed or average reviews".

== Track listing ==
No.	Title	Writer(s)	Lead vocals	Length
1.	"I Want My Now"	Alice Cooper; Joe Perry; Johnny Depp; Tommy Henriksen	Cooper	7:13
2.	"Good People Are Hard to Find"	Depp; Henriksen	(instrumental)	1:02
3.	"Who's Laughing Now"	Cooper; Perry; Depp; Henriksen	Cooper	4:09
4.	"How the Glass Fell"	Depp; Buck Johnson; Finn; Cooper; Henriksen	(instrumental)	0:30
5.	"The Boogieman Surprise"	Cooper; Perry; Depp; Henriksen	Cooper	3:38
6.	"Welcome to Bushwackers" (featuring Jeff Beck and John Waters)	Cooper; Perry; Depp; Henriksen; Tommy Denander	Cooper	4:13
7.	"The Wrong Bandage"	Depp; Jamie Muhoberac	(instrumental)	0:28
8.	"You Can't Put Your Arms Around a Memory"	Johnny Thunders	Perry	3:51
9.	"Git from Round Me"	Cooper; Perry; Depp; Henriksen	Henriksen and Depp	4:22
10.	"Heroes"	David Bowie; Brian Eno	Depp	4:08
11.	"A Pitiful Beauty"	Depp; Chris Wyse	(instrumental)	1:27
12.	"New Threat"	Cooper; Perry; Depp; Henriksen	Cooper	3:33
13.	"Mr. Spider"	Cooper; Perry; Depp; Henriksen	Cooper	6:02
14.	"We Gotta Rise"	Cooper; Perry; Depp; Henriksen	Cooper and Depp	3:34
15.	"People Who Died"	Jim Carroll	Depp	4:56
16.	"Congratulations"	Cooper; Perry; Depp; Henriksen; Billie Perry; Sheryl Cooper	(spoken word)	3:31

== Charts ==
Chart	Peak position
Australian Albums (ARIA)	44
Belgian Albums (Ultratop Flanders)	34
Belgian Albums (Ultratop Wallonia)	30
Austrian Albums (Ö3 Austria)	14
German Albums (Offizielle Top 100)	12
Scottish Albums (OCC)	7
Spanish Albums (PROMUSICAE)	55
Swiss Albums (Schweizer Hitparade)	12
UK Albums (OCC)	17
UK Independent Albums (OCC)	5
UK Rock & Metal Albums (OCC)	1
US Billboard 200	184
US Top Hard Rock Albums (Billboard)	7
US Top Rock Albums (Billboard)	32

== See also ==
- List of UK Rock & Metal Albums Chart number ones of 2019
