= Chris Wyse =

American musician

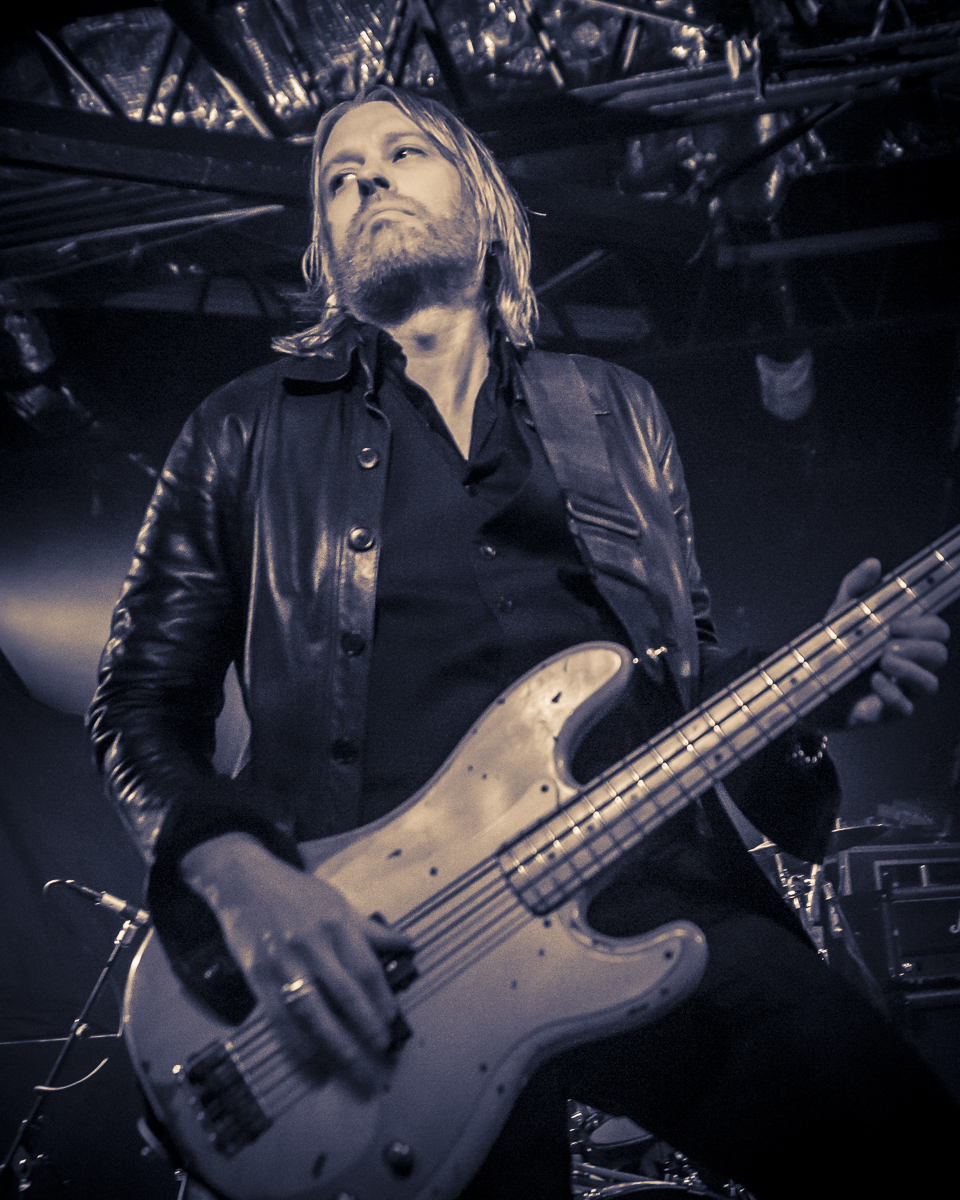
- Wyse in 2013

Background information
- Born: July 15, 1969 (age 57); Queens, New York
- Genres: Hard rock, heavy metal, alternative rock
- Occupations: Bassist, Vocalist, Songwriter, Producer
- Instruments: Bass, vocals
- Years active: 1990–present
- Labels: Roadrunner Records, Cooking Vinyl, Overit
- Member of: Owl; Hollywood Vampires
- Formerly of: The Cult; Ozzy Osbourne; Ace Frehley
- Website: chriswyse.com

Chris Wyse (born July 15, 1969) is an American bassist and vocalist. He is best known for his performances with The Cult, Ozzy Osbourne, Ace Frehley and Hollywood Vampires. He is also the vocalist and bassist for Owl, a band he founded in 2007.

== Early life ==
Wyse is a first-generation Irish American and was born in Queens, New York. He discovered the music of Kiss, The Doors, and Led Zeppelin in grade school, and was inspired by Iron Maiden's Steve Harris to play bass. Performing with local bands in New York, he was profiled in Guitar Player Magazine at 17 and featured in Guitar For the Practicing Musician at 20.

== Career ==
=== Bob Rock, The Cult ===
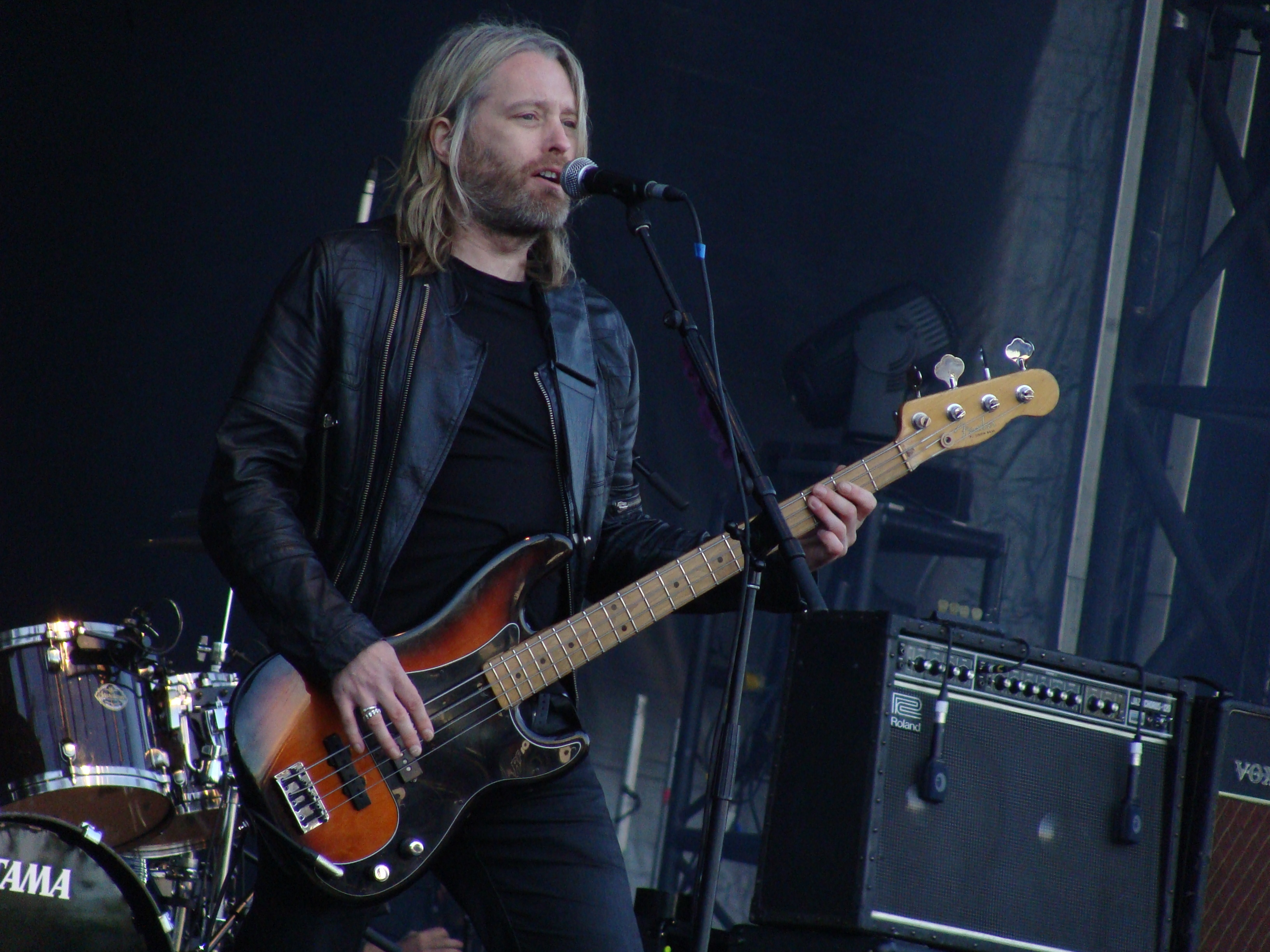
Wyse performing with The Cult in 2011

In 1990, prompted by the success of a studio session with musicians associated with Steve Vai, Wyse moved to Los Angeles, where he devoted most of his time to playing with bands. After performing with artists including the band Lusk (with Guns N' Roses's Chris Pitman and Tool's Paul D'Amour), Wyse was introduced to producer Bob Rock and became Rock's "go-to" bassist. He played with Rock-produced artists including Tal Bachman, as well as artists unaffiliated with Rock, such as Scott Weiland. In 2001, Wyse played on The Cult's album, Beyond Good and Evil, which Rock produced. In 2003, Rock, who was then producing Metallica, suggested to the band that Wyse audition for their bass spot. He was one of a handful of bassists selected to play with Metallica during the audition process, which was documented in the film Some Kind of Monster.

In 2006, he became The Cult's full-time bass player, touring worldwide and recording two additional albums.

=== Ozzy Osbourne, Owl ===
In 2004, Wyse was recruited for Ozzy Osbourne's band by drummer Mike Bordin after they met while playing as part of Jerry Cantrell's solo band. He played on Ozzy's Under Cover album, which was included on Osbourne's box set, Prince of Darkness. Wyse also played in Jerry Cantrell's covers band Cardboard Vampyres. Additionally, Wyse performed and recorded with Bob Rock's band, the Payola$.

In 2007, Wyse founded Owl, an alternative rock band. He is the band's singer, songwriter, and producer, and plays bass guitar and upright bass, sometimes creating "Hendrix-like effect on the upright bass" by using a bow. Wyse formed Owl with his childhood friend, drummer Dan Dinsmore, and LA-based guitarist Jason Achilles Mezilis. Described as "approaching timeless rock structures through a healthy amount of experimentation and instrumental intricacy" Owl released their self-titled debut album in 2009, followed by the album The Right Thing in April 2013. The first music video from the album, the title track's The Right Thing, premiered on Rolling Stone's website in March 2013. Owl released their third album, Things You Can't See, in the summer of 2015. Owl's third album, Things You Can't See, was released in summer 2015. A video for the title track was released in 2018.

=== Ace Frehley, Hollywood Vampires ===
Wyse played bass guitar on Ace Frehley's album, Space Invader. He toured with Frehley following the release of the album and played on his next release, Origins Vol 1, which featured Paul Stanley on vocals for the track "Fire and Water".

Wyse left The Cult in 2015, and has continued to tour and record with Frehley. In January 2018, he played "New York Groove" with Frehley prior to the Bridgestone NHL Winter Classic between the New York Rangers and Buffalo Sabres at Citi Field. The song is a staple at New York sporting events; it is played when the New York Giants score and when the New York Mets win.

Wyse joined the Hollywood Vampires in 2018. A supergroup that includes Joe Perry, Alice Cooper, and Johnny Depp, Wyse performed with the band on world tours in 2018 and 2019, and played on their sophomore album, Rise, released on Ear Music in 2019.

== Discography ==
Year	Artist	Project Title	Credit
1999	Scott Weiland's Big Blue Missile	The Spy Who Shagged Me OST	Bass
1999	Tal Bachman	Tal Bachman	Bass
2000	Nina Gordon	Tonight and the Rest of My Life	Upright Bass
2001	Owl	Flammable: A Tribute To The Red Hot Chili Peppers	Bass, Upright Bass; Producer
2001	Owl	Broken Machine: A Tribute To Nine Inch Nails	Bass, Upright Bass; Producer
2001	Mick Jagger	Goddess in the Doorway	Bass
2001	The Cult	Beyond Good and Evil	Bass
2005	Ozzy Osbourne	Under Cover	Bass
2005	Ozzy Osbourne	Prince of Darkness	Bass
2007	The Cult	Born into This	Bass, Songwriter
2008	Various Artists	We Wish You A Metal Xmas and a Headbanging New Year	Bass
2009	Owl	Owl	Vocals, Bass, Upright Bass; Songwriter, Producer
2012	The Cult	Choice of Weapon	Bass, Upright Bass; Songwriter
2013	Owl	The Right Thing	Vocals, Bass, Upright Bass; Songwriter, Producer
2014	Ace Frehley	Space Invader	Bass guitar
2015	Owl	Things You Can’t See	Vocals, Bass, Upright Bass; Songwriter, Producer
2016	Ace Frehley	Origins Vol. 1	Bass guitar
2019	Hollywood Vampires	Rise	Bass Guitar, Upright Bass; Songwriter

== Videography/Filmography/Television Appearances ==
Year	Artist	Song or Title	Appearance in or on
1999	Tal Bachman	"She's So High"	Music video
1999	Tal Bachman	"If You Sleep"	Music video
2004	Metallica	Metallica: Some Kind of Monster	Film
2006	The Cult	"Wildflower"	Late Late Show with Craig Ferguson
2006	The Cult	"She Sells Sanctuary"	Jimmy Kimmel Live
2006	The Cult	Live at Irving Plaza	DVD
2009	Owl	"Pusher"	Music video
2010	Ace Frehley	Behind the Player	DVD
2012	The Cult	"Honey From A Knife"	Music video
2012	The Cult	"Love Removal Machine", "Wildflower" "She Sells Sanctuary", "For The Animals"	Jimmy Kimmel Live
2012	The Cult	"For the Animals"	Music video
2013	Owl	"Perfect"	Music video
2013	Owl	"Destroyer"	Music video
2013	Owl	"The Right Thing"	Music video
2015	Owl	"Who’s Gonna Save You Now"	Music video
2016	Ace Frehley	"Fire and Water"	Music video
2017	Owl	"Lake Ego"	Music video
2018	Owl	"Things You Can't See"	Music video
2018	Owl	"Believe"	Music video
2019	Hollywood Vampires	"Heroes"	Music video
2019	Hollywood Vampires	"Boogie Man Surprise"	Music video
2019	Hollywood Vampires	"Who's Laughing Now"	Music video
2019	Hollywood Vampires	"Heroes", "I Want My Now"	Jimmy Kimmel Live
2019	Hollywood Vampires	"Heroes", "I Want My Now"	The Late Late Show with James Corden
