= "Heroes" (David Bowie song) =

1977 single by David Bowie

"'Heroes'"
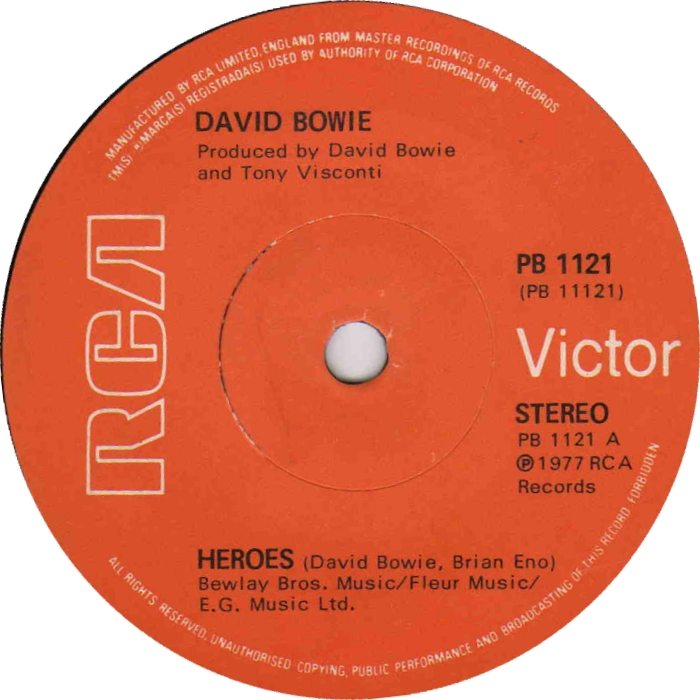
- A-side label of the UK vinyl single

Single by David Bowie

from the album "Heroes"
- B-side: "V-2 Schneider"
- Released: 23 September 1977
- Recorded: July–August 1977
- Studio: Hansa (West Berlin)
- Genre: Art rock
- Length: 6:07 (album version); 3:32 (single version)
- Label: RCA
- Songwriters: David Bowie; Brian Eno
- Producers: David Bowie; Tony Visconti

David Bowie singles chronology
"Be My Wife" (1977)	"'Heroes'" (1977)	"Beauty and the Beast" (1978)

Music video
- "'Heroes'" on YouTube

"'Heroes'" (Note: The quotation marks are part of the title. On some single releases, the title does not include the quotes.) is a song by the English musician David Bowie from his 12th studio album of the same name. Co-written by Bowie and Brian Eno and co-produced by Bowie and Tony Visconti, the song was recorded in mid-1977 at Hansa Studio 2 in West Berlin. The backing track was recorded fully before the lyrics were written; Bowie and Eno added synthesiser overdubs while Robert Fripp contributed guitar. To record the vocals, Visconti devised a "multi-latch" system, in which three microphones were placed at different distances from Bowie and would open when he sang loudly enough. As with other album tracks, he improvised lyrics while standing at the microphone.

An art rock song that builds throughout its run time, "'Heroes'" concerns two lovers, one each from East and West Berlin. Under constant fear of death, they dream they are free, swimming with dolphins. Bowie placed the title in quotation marks as an expression of irony on the otherwise romantic and triumphant words and music. Bowie's lyrics were primarily inspired by seeing Visconti and singer Antonia Maass kiss beside the Berlin Wall; other inspirations included a painting by Otto Mueller and a short story by Alberto Denti di Pirajno. Scholars have associated the song with Cold War-era Berlin, interpreting the divided city as a metaphor for personal struggles and Bowie's recovery from addiction.

On 23 September 1977, the song was released as a single, shortened by two minutes and starting with the third verse. It initially received mostly positive reviews, with some welcoming it as a classic addition to the artist's catalogue. Bowie promoted it with a music video and sang it on numerous television programmes, including Marc Bolan's Marc and Bing Crosby's Merrie Olde Christmas special. Bowie also released German- and French-language versions of "'Heroes'", titled "'Helden'" and "'Héros'", respectively. Despite its heavy promotion, the single only peaked at number 24 on the UK Singles Chart and failed to chart at all on the US Billboard Hot 100 or the Canadian Top 100; however, it reached the top 10 and the top 20 in multiple European countries and Australia.

Over time, the song's reputation has grown substantially, and it is now widely considered one of Bowie's finest songs and one of the greatest songs of all time. His biographers pan the song's single edit for diminishing its power. Following Bowie's death in 2016, it reached a new chart peak of number 12 in the UK.The song remained a staple throughout his concert tours and live performances, and is Bowie's second-most-covered song after "Rebel Rebel" (1974). A version of "'Heroes'" by the Wallflowers was positively received and charted in the US and Canada in 1998. Another version by the series 7 finalists of The X Factor was a UK number one in 2010. The song has also been widely used in advertising over the years and has appeared in several television series and films.

== Writing and recording ==
=== Backing track ===
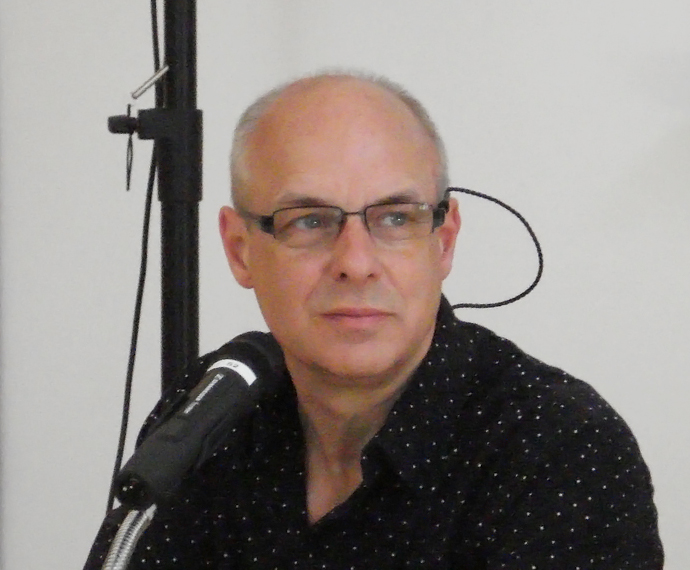
Bowie composed the song with multi-instrumentalist Brian Eno (pictured in 2008), who had the word heroes in mind for the initial chord sequence.

After completing his work co-producing Iggy Pop's Lust for Life (1977) and various promotional events, David Bowie spent a few weeks devising ideas and concepts with multi-instrumentalist Brian Eno for his next studio album. One idea was using the same D–G chord sequence he had used for Pop's "Success". Eno wanted to call it "Heroes", as the sequence "sounded grand and heroic", and "I had that very word – heroes – in my mind". According to the biographer Chris O'Leary, the word also paid reference to the German krautrock band Neu!'s "Hero" (1975). Recording for the album took place entirely in West Berlin between July and August 1977 at Hansa Studio 2, a former concert hall converted into a recording studio that had been used by Gestapo officers as a ballroom during World War II and was about 500 yards from the Berlin Wall. The song was co-produced by Bowie and Tony Visconti, with contributions from Eno.

The backing track began with Bowie on piano and the core band of Carlos Alomar on rhythm guitar, George Murray on bass and Dennis Davis on drums. The band used the initial chord progression, creating a groove that built into a crescendo, lasting eight minutes. Alomar devised the underlying riff while Murray and Davis provided the "hypnotic pulse". Although he had fed Davis's drums through his Eventide H910 Harmonizer on Low (1977), Visconti used it sparingly on the album "Heroes", only during the mixing stage; as such, the drum sound was unaltered. He ran Murray's bass through a flanger.

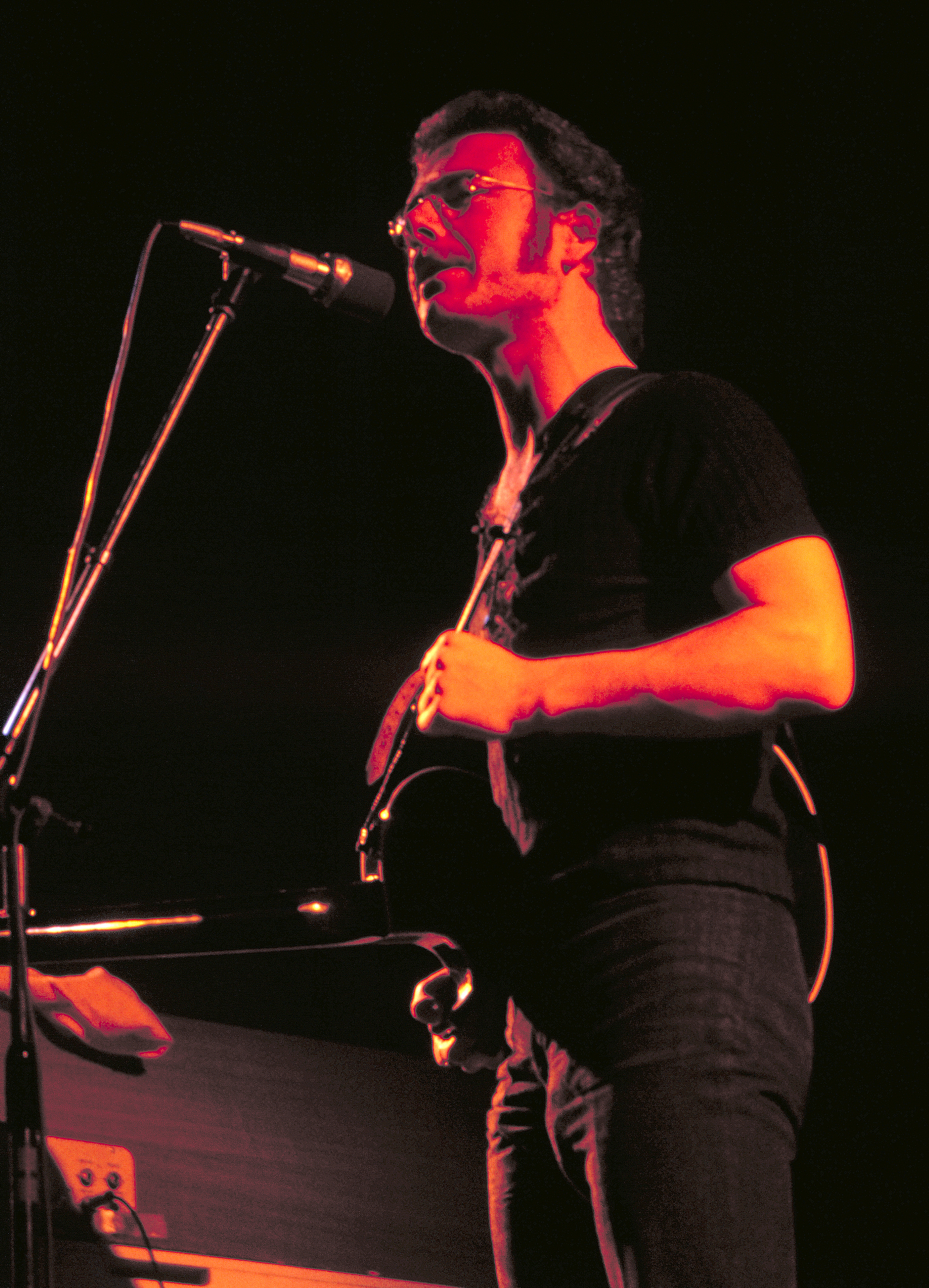
The song features guitar lines from Robert Fripp (pictured in 1974).

According to Visconti, the recording sat for a week before overdubs commenced. Eno brought in his EMS Synthi AKS, a synthesiser built in a briefcase, using its joystick, oscillator knobs and noise filter to create a "shuddering, chattering effect" that slowly builds through the song. Bowie also added parts on a Chamberlin keyboard and high-pitched lines on his ARP String Ensemble synthesiser.

The guitarist Robert Fripp was recruited at Eno's suggestion. Receiving little guidance from Bowie, Fripp created the guitar line through the extensive use of feedback. He produced different feedback pitches by standing at different distances from his amplifier, which he marked on the studio floor with tape. His guitar was in turn fed through Eno's Synthi. Bowie's touring guitarists later recreated the sound with an EBow for live performances, though Fripp did not use one in the studio.

When mixing the backing track, Visconti merged Fripp's three takes onto one track, creating what he called "a dreamy, wailing quality". He buried Davis's kick drum, finding the track "more energetic without it", and elevated Murray's bassline, which Alomar augmented on guitar in a higher register. An intended horn section was simulated with the Chamberlin, while the bassline replaced the originally planned string section. Visconti then added a tambourine part and struck an empty tape canister with a drumstick to mimic a cowbell.

=== Vocals ===
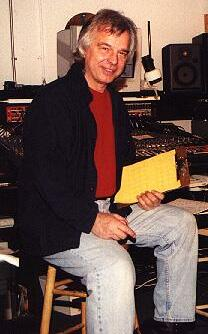
Co-producer Tony Visconti (pictured in 2007) devised the "multi-latch" system used to record the lead vocal and sang backing vocals.

Similarly to Low, Bowie did not write lyrics until all but he and Visconti had departed. As such, the backing track for "'Heroes'" sat untouched for many weeks and, for a time, it was rumoured that the track would remain an instrumental. One day, Bowie asked Visconti to leave him alone in the studio to focus on writing lyrics. As he stared outside the studio window, he saw Visconti and singer Antonia Maass kiss by the Berlin Wall, which he used as the basis for the lyric. (Note: Maass later claimed that the song had been completed before their encounter, so Bowie could not have used them for inspiration.) Like with other songs on "Heroes", he improvised lyrics while standing at the microphone after seeing Pop use the same method during the making of The Idiot (1977) and Lust for Life.

To record the lead vocal, Visconti devised a "multi-latch" system that would make full use of the ambience at Hansa. Three Neumann microphones were used to capture the vocal: the first, a U 47, was set up 9 in (23 cm) from Bowie; the second, a U 87, was set up 20 ft (6.1 m) away; and the third, another U 87, about 50 ft (15 m) away. The two farther microphones were routed through noise gates, which activated them as Bowie raised his voice enough to reach them. Visconti said: "If he sang a little louder, the next microphone would open up with the gate, and that would make sort of this big splash of reverb, and then if he really sang loud, the back microphone would open up, and it would just open up this enormous sound."

Bowie recorded three takes, the last of which mostly appears in the final song, over the course of about two hours. Bowie and Visconti immediately recorded the backing vocals afterwards, harmonising in thirds and fifths below the lead vocal. The final mix was done at Mountain Studios in Montreux, Switzerland, which later became one of Bowie's preferred studios. David Richards, an engineer at Mountain, also became one of his regulars.

== Composition ==
=== Music ===
"'Heroes'"
One of the ambient rock songs to emerge from Bowie's Berlin Trilogy era, "'Heroes'" gained lasting popularity.

"'Heroes'" uses a standard 4/4 time signature and a simple D–G chord progression. At over six minutes in length on the album, it contains five verses, some longer than others, and an outro. The verses move from D major to G major, along with C major on "nothing will keep us together" and a foray into A minor and E minor on "beat them" and "forever". The song is mainly in the D mixolydian mode, wherein the A major dominant chord is replaced with A minor, thereby swapping from the parallel minor D minor back to the tonic D major.

Richard Buskin of Sound on Sound described the song as a "highly experimental piece of art rock". The biographer David Buckley likens it to a Wall of Sound production, with a forceful and noisy arrangement of guitars, percussion and synthesisers. The author James E. Perone finds the song a "great example of contemporary pop music", informed by early 1970s progressive rock and featuring "avant-garde tone color manipulations" from Eno. According to Bowie, the track was "a combination of Brian's piano technique and [mine] which are both dastardly", and was based on the Velvet Underground's "I'm Waiting for the Man" (1967), a song long admired by the artist.

The song is led by Davis's drum beat, described by Tiffany Naiman as "a steadfast marker of rock and roll rhythm ... faded way back in the mix." The scholar Maximilian Feldner compared this to the "monotonous, motoric [sic] beat" of 1970s krautrock bands. Combined with the bass, rhythm guitar, ARP Solina synthesiser and Chamberlin parts, the song's rhythm track features layers of sound on top of one another. Naiman states that Eno's contributions on EMS Synthi "swooshes and chatters, becoming more and more clear as the track continues and develops in intensity". Visconti created the song's soundscapes, which O'Leary called a "pulsating drone". The song builds in intensity throughout its six-minute runtime, aided by percussion. The result is what Buckley calls "a droning, repetitive, oncoming, unstoppable, mechanical black of sound". Fripp's contributions, consisting of mostly feedback, give the song a quality described as "monumental" and "a feeling of infinity". Bowie's vocal performance begins softly with a low croon, becoming increasingly strained before turning into a high shriek during the fifth verse.

=== Lyrics ===
Berlin is a city made up of bars for sad, disillusioned people to get drunk in. ... The title track of 'Heroes' is about facing that kind of reality and standing up to it. The only heroic act one can [...] pull out of the bag in a situation like that is to get on with life and derive some joy from the very simple pleasure of remaining alive, despite every attempt being made to kill you.

— David Bowie, Melody Maker, 1977

"'Heroes'" tells the story of two lovers, one from East Berlin and one from West Berlin. Under constant risk of death, they dream of freedom, swimming with dolphins. Similar to other album tracks "Beauty and the Beast" and "Joe the Lion", the song, at its core, represents two opposing forces: the couple's love for each other, and a sense that the Berlin Wall will separate them. The first verse is from the point of view of the man who stresses unity, while the second describes the couple's explicit love and affection for each other. Perone contends that the instrumental passages separating the third verse, wherein the narrator wishes his lover could "swim like the dolphins", represent a transition in the story. The fourth verse is a reiteration of the first, albeit Bowie sings an octave higher and in a near-scream. In the fifth and final verse, the narrator recalls standing and kissing by the Wall while guards fired bullets above their heads. Perone states that this moment captures the sense that the narrator's love can "overcome anything" and, as dolphins can freely swim as they wish, the proclamation that "we can be heroes ... gets well beyond anything the listener might have anticipated at the start of the piece".

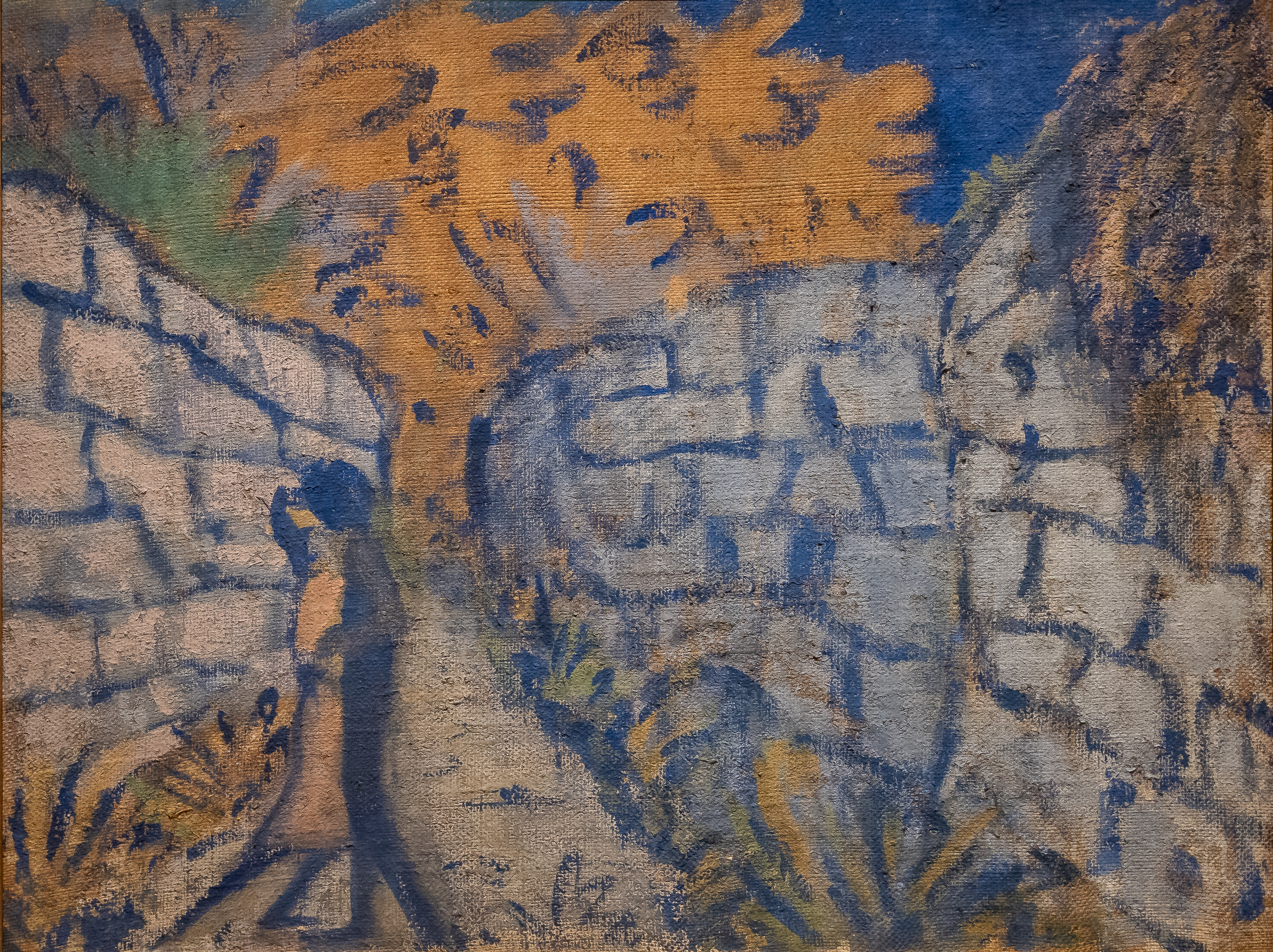
Otto Mueller's 1916 painting Lovers Between Garden Walls partly inspired the lyrics of "'Heroes'"

The song's lyrics were primarily inspired by Bowie's seeing Visconti and Maass kissing near the Berlin Wall. Bowie initially claimed that the lyric was based on an anonymous young couple, but Visconti, who was married to Mary Hopkin at the time, contended that Bowie was protecting him and his affair with Maass. Bowie later confirmed the story in 2003, over two decades after Visconti and Hopkins' eventual divorce. Another source of inspiration included Otto Mueller's 1916 painting Lovers Between Garden Walls, depicting a couple embracing between two walls representing the brutality of World War I, which Bowie and Pop saw at Berlin's Brücke Museum. A third inspiration, which Bowie revealed in the foreword of his wife Iman's 2001 book I Am Iman, was Alberto Denti di Pirajno's 1956 short story A Grave for a Dolphin, concerning a doomed love affair between an Italian soldier and a Somalian girl during World War II. According to Nicholas Pegg, the destiny of the story's female protagonist is linked with that of a dolphin she swims with, and when she dies, so does the dolphin. The phrase "I will be king, you will be queen" was taken directly from the traditional English folk song "Lavender's Blue". (Note: Bowie later incorporated "Lavender's Blue" into performances of "'Heroes'" during the 1983 Serious Moonlight Tour.)

Bowie is also recounted to have used events in his own life for the lyrics, such as his then-marital issues, alcoholism and his inability to swim ("I wish I could swim"). (Note: Bowie revealed in 1987 that he "can do a couple of lengths of the pool", but in 2000, stated that "I've never swum again. I swam once, it was quite enough for me.") In the late 2010s, a story on the Italian Bowie website Blackstar revealed that the artist Clare Shenstone, whom Bowie met in 1969, had visited him during the summer he recorded "'Heroes'". The two spent a day walking along the Wall, which started, in her words, "with David asking me if I dreamed about him because he dreamed about me. I told him I had just had a beautiful dream about swimming with dolphins." In a 2024 documentary, Shenstone claimed the song's lyrics were directly inspired by the day the two spent together, saying the lyrics "like dolphins can swim" were referring to the dream she had and told Bowie about, while other lyrics, such as "and the guns, shot above our heads and we kissed, as though nothing could fall", were Bowie recalling moments from the day when the two were walking by the Wall and kissed there.

=== Analysis ===
Several commentators have argued that "'Heroes'" is not the "feelgood anthem" it is often interpreted as. Peter and Leni Gillman write that the song "is assumed to celebrate bravery and struggle against the odds: a testimony to 'the capacity for greatness [...] within us all.'" According to Bowie, the quotation marks in the title were intended to express "a dimension of irony" on the otherwise romantic or triumphant words and music. He stated it is about "facing reality and standing up to it", about achieving "a sense of compassion" and "deriving some joy from the very simple pleasure of being alive". Pegg writes that the song contains underlying dark themes that juxtapose its uplifting chord sequence and delirious vocal delivery, while the repeated announcement of "nothing will keep us together" asserts that time is short. Additionally, the pronouncement that the narrator wants the relationship to last "just for one day" harkens back to the dark lyrics of "The Bewlay Brothers" (1971) and represents a shift from the Nietzschean Übermensch themes of Bowie's earlier works into the realm of heroism. Discussing the themes, Blurt magazine's Robert Dean Lurie stated:

"'Heroes'" is more akin to alchemy: We may be average and regular in the present moment, but we have the potential, at any time, for heroic thought and action – even if only for one day. The transformation can be brought about by an external event or through an internal change in perspective.

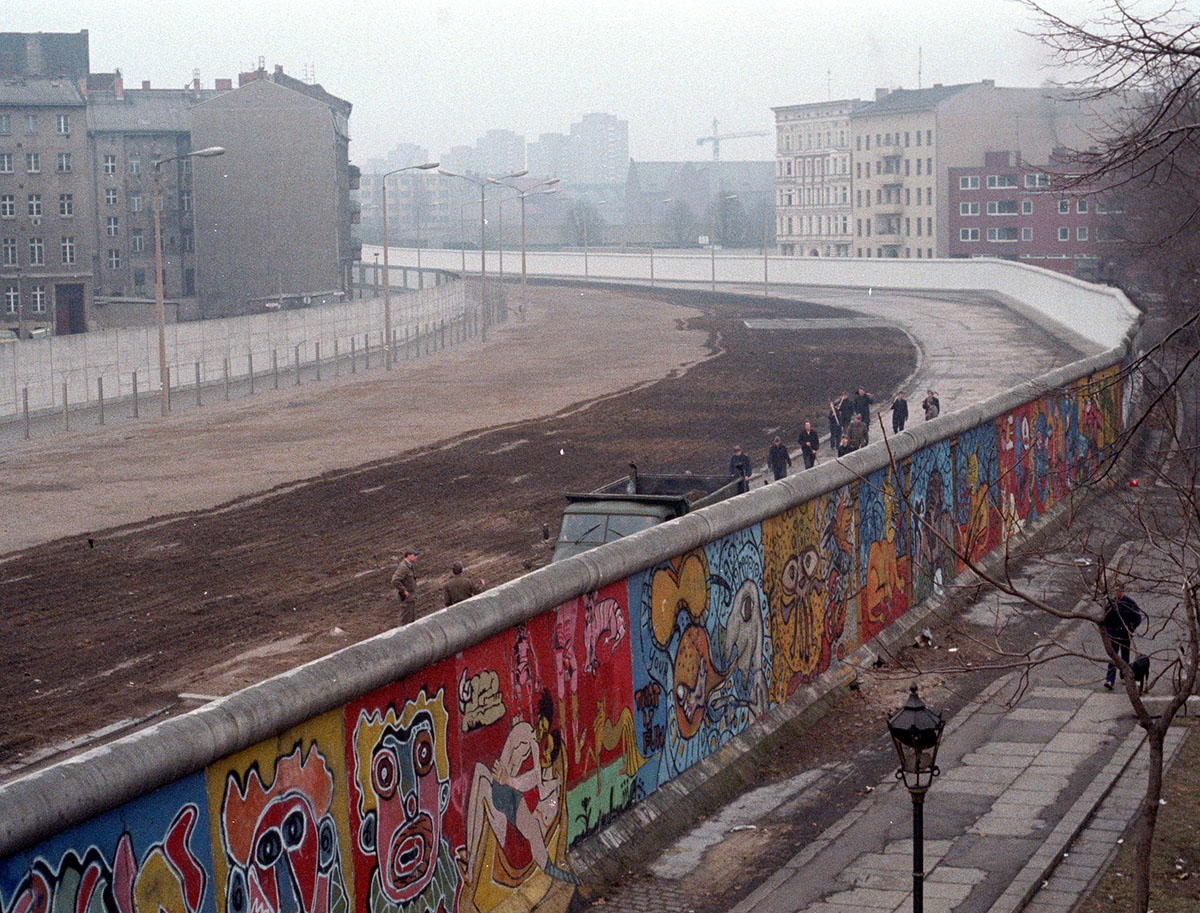
The lyrics of "'Heroes'" reference the Berlin Wall (pictured in 1988); the song has been inextricably linked to Cold War Berlin.

Since its release, "'Heroes'" has been the subject of scholarly analysis. The song has been inextricably tied to Berlin (Note: Including by Robert Dean Lurie and Max Fisher) despite the only reference to the city being "the Wall" in the climactic verse. As a cultural artifact that shapes collective memory, the song has contributed to how Cold War Berlin is remembered. Feldner believes this is due to the circumstances and mythology behind the song's creation. Affirming the Cold War narrative, Max Fisher said in a 2016 Vox article that the lyrics "capture the hopelessness and desperation of a city divided, friends and family in the East kept apart from their loved ones in the West by violence and terror". He compared the lyric about dolphins swimming to the story of Henri Weise, an East German man who drowned trying to cross the Spree river.

In his book Forever Stardust (2017), Will Brooker argues that, despite being attributed to the divided Berlin, the song's meaning is more complex and personal. While "'Heroes'" references the Berlin Wall, the lyrics contain "fantastical" promises ("I will be king, and you, you will be queen"), which Brooker suggests are more about wish fulfillment and internal struggles than true heroism. (Note: Brooker made comparisons to Bowie's 1967 song "When I Live My Dream", a song that, like "'Heroes'", contains "fantastical" lyrics about a narrator attempting to gain the support of a partner with a shared memory.) In a broader context, he argues that it acts as a bridge between public myth and private reality, using Berlin and the Wall as metaphors for striving against overwhelming odds. Furthermore, Brooker and Feldner state that the song is less politically charged than widely assumed. Amidst a struggle for personal survival against adversity, depression and addiction, the song uses the divided Berlin as a backdrop and framework for exploring Bowie's psyche and recovery from addiction. The scholars write that the song's power comes from its ambiguity, inviting different interpretations for different audiences.

== Promotion and release ==
=== Filmed appearances ===
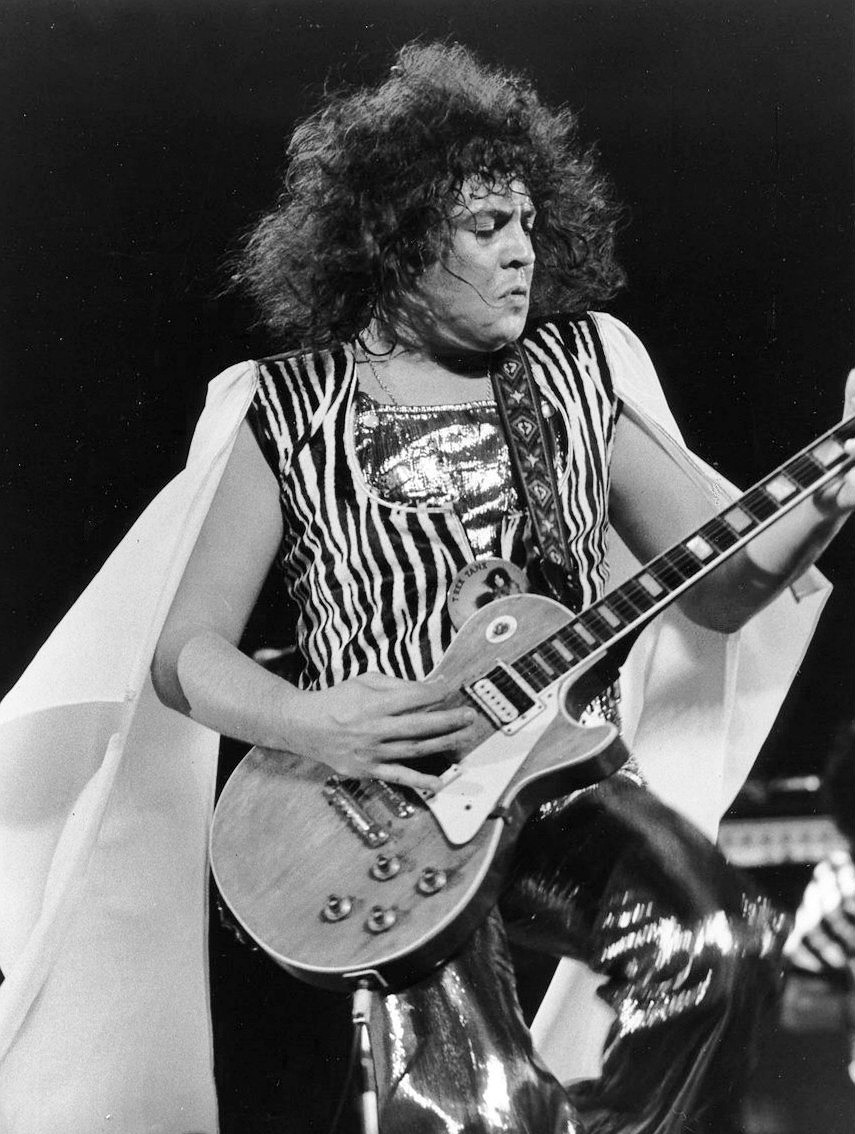
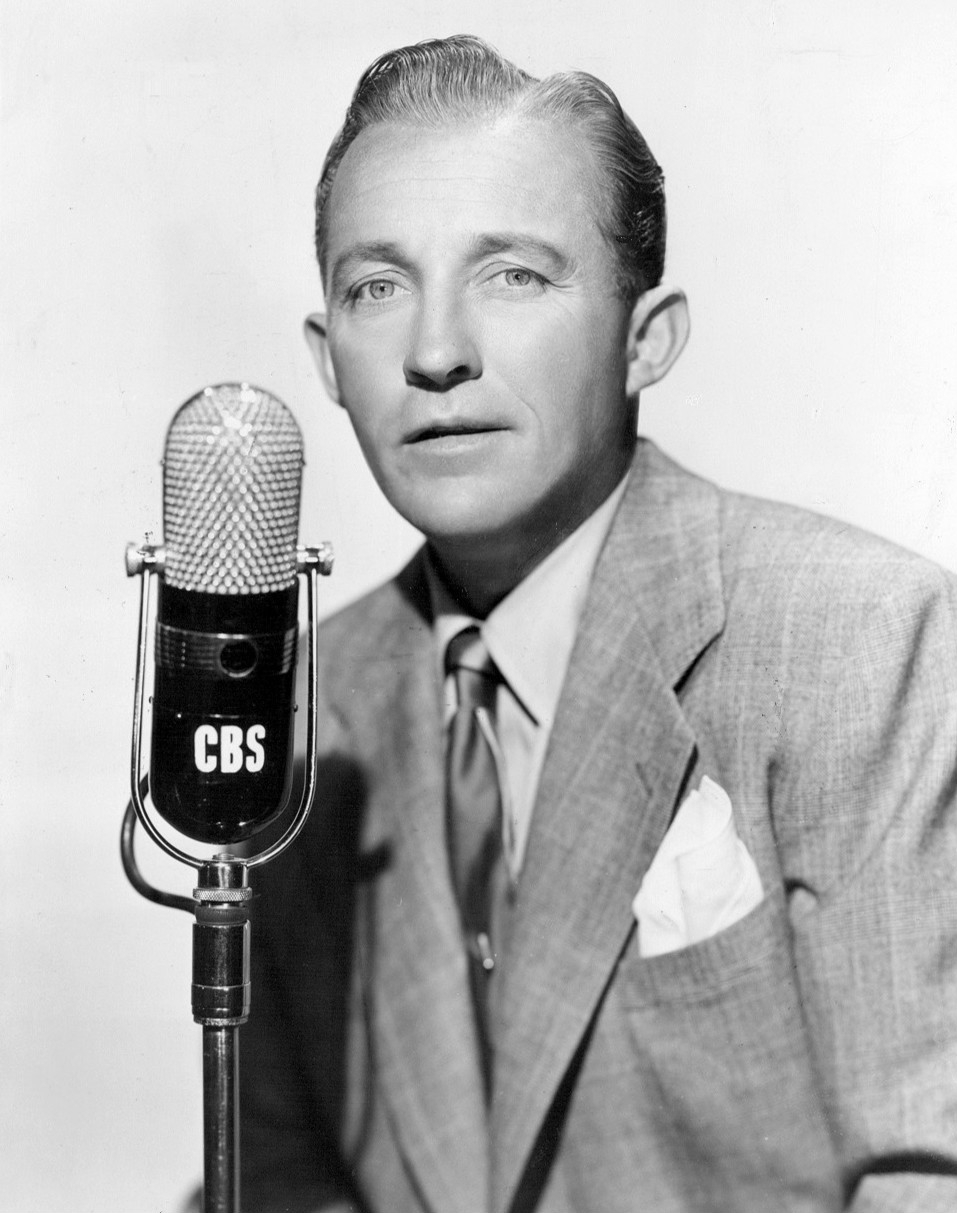
To promote "'Heroes'", Bowie appeared on television programmes hosted by Marc Bolan (left, pictured in 1973) and Bing Crosby (right, pictured in 1951).

After undertaking no promotional events for Low, Bowie promoted "Heroes" extensively. In early September 1977, he agreed to perform the title track on Marc Bolan's Granada Television series Marc, which was recorded on 9 September and broadcast on 28 September, following Bolan's death in a car crash on 16 September. This version has an alternative backing track that was recorded with Bolan playing lead guitar and the T. Rex line up of Dino Dines on keyboards, and the rhythm section of Herbie Flowers on bass and Tony Newman on drums. (Note: Flowers and Newman had played with Bowie on his 1974 album Diamond Dogs and its accompanying tour.) It was released as a 7" picture disc on 22 September 2017.

Two days after filming the Marc appearance, Bowie appeared on Bing Crosby's television special Bing Crosby's Merrie Olde Christmas, performing "'Heroes'" and a new duet with Crosby titled "Peace on Earth/Little Drummer Boy". Crosby died on 14 October before the special's broadcast on Christmas Eve 1977. Bowie later quipped: "I was getting seriously worried about whether I should appear on TV because everyone I was going on with was kicking it the following week." On 19 October, Bowie appeared on BBC's Top of the Pops for the first time since 1973, performing "'Heroes'" using a new backing track featuring Visconti on bass and Sean Mayes on keyboards. Bowie sang live over the backing track with none of the band present. He sang the song again on the Dutch programme TopPop and the Italian programmes Odeon and L'altra domenica later the same month.

=== Single and other releases ===
RCA issued "'Heroes'" as the lead single from the album on 23 September 1977, with the album track "V-2 Schneider" as the B-side. Its shortened 3:32 edit, which begins at the third verse, was made in the hopes of more airplay. A 12" promotional single, containing both the single and album versions, was released in the US by RCA (as JD-11151) the same year. On the "Heroes" album, issued on 14 October, the song was sequenced as the third track, between "Joe the Lion" and "Sons of the Silent Age".

The song's promotional music video was directed by Stanley Dorfman. Shot in Paris, it features footage of Bowie in a dark room against a backdrop of white light and wearing the same bomber-jacket he wore on the "Heroes" cover artwork. Pegg compares the final result to Liza Minnelli's performance of "Maybe This Time" in the Berlin-based 1972 film Cabaret.

Bowie recorded new vocals for the track in both German and French, with lyrics translated by Maass for the German release. These singles, titled "'Helden'" and "'Héros'", respectively, were issued in their respective countries in September. Additionally, for the album releases in Germany and France, the vocals were grafted onto the full-length tracks, following the opening English verses. The single's release in a variety of languages and lengths achieved what the NME editors Roy Carr and Charles Shaar Murray called "a collector's wet dream". Despite an intense promotional push, "'Heroes'" only reached number 24 on the UK Singles Chart, remaining on the chart for eight weeks and failing to chart at all on the US Billboard Hot 100, albeit reaching a low number 126 on Record World's Singles Chart 101–150. Elsewhere, it charted in Australia (6), Austria (19), Belgium Flanders (17), the Irish Singles Chart (8), the Netherlands (9) and New Zealand (34).

=== Later releases ===
"'Heroes'" has subsequently appeared, almost invariably as the single edit, on numerous compilation albums, including The Best of Bowie (1980), Changesbowie (1990), The Singles Collection (1993), The Best of David Bowie 1974/1979 (1998), Best of Bowie (2002), The Platinum Collection (2006), Nothing Has Changed (2014), and Bowie Legacy (2016). The full album track was remastered with its parent album for inclusion on the 2017 box set A New Career in a New Town (1977–1982). The single edit was included on Re:Call 3, part of that box set, while the German single, French single, English-German full-length, and English-French full-length versions were included on an EP in the same set. Additionally, the English-German version of the song appeared on the soundtrack to the film Christiane F. (1981) (Note: The soundtrack was composed of Bowie songs from the late 1970s, and Bowie himself appeared in the film.) and on the Rare album in 1982, while the German single version appeared on Sound + Vision (1989).

== Critical reception ==
Initial reviews for "'Heroes'" were mostly positive. Like Low's "Sound and Vision", some viewed it as the most commercial track from "Heroes". Several welcomed the song as a classic addition to Bowie's catalogue. Record Mirror's Tim Lott deemed it "regal" and a "shocking dream[ingly] powerful" song that stands out as the album's best. He found the lyrics are "in a sense throwaway" but display "simple heroism": "Brick by synthesised brick it builds into a leviathan, a monster track that sucks you in and spews you out grinning ..." Kris Needs of ZigZag magazine also considered the song a "monster" track with its end result being "magic". Ira Robbins went further in Crawdaddy magazine, hailing the song as Bowie's best song in three years, praising the instrumentation and vocal performance, and highlighted Eno's contributions among the track's best features.

In the Los Angeles Times, Robert Hilburn wrote that despite the dreariness of "Heroes" as a whole, the title track contains "compassion and some fleeting hope". A reviewer for Billboard deemed the song one of the album's best tracks. Writing in Hit Parader, American musician and author Patti Smith praised "'Heroes'" as a "pure" and "wonderful" track that "exposes us to our most precious and private dilemma". She predicted that it would become the "theme song for every great movie" that would be "made remade or yet to come". Charlie Gillett gave the single a mixed review in the NME, saying: "Well he had a pretty good run for our money, for a guy who was no singer. But I think his time has been and gone, and this just sounds weary. Then again, maybe the ponderous heavy riff will be absorbed on the radio, and the monotonous feel may just be hypnotic enough to drag people into buying it. I hope not." The magazine placed it at number six in their list of the year's best singles.

== Retrospective appraisal ==
This is a strange phenomenon that happens with my songs Stateside. Many of the crowd favourites were never radio or chart hits, and "'Heroes'" tops them all.

— David Bowie on the song's later success, 2003

"'Heroes'" has greatly grown in stature in the decades following its release. Pegg and O'Leary note that it was not until Bowie's performance of the song at Live Aid in 1985 that it became recognised as a classic. Buckley describes this rendition as "the best version of 'Heroes' [Bowie] had ever sung". Reviewing the song for AllMusic, Ned Raggett described it as arguably Bowie's finest song and a "true classic", writing that with Eno, Fripp and Visconti, Bowie crafted an anthem embellished with German influences while still using the "dramatic power" of rock and roll. Analysing his vocal, he wrote: "Starting with an almost conversational tone, by the end of the song he's turning in a performance that could almost be called operatic, yet still achingly, passionately human."

Pitchfork's Ryan Dombal described "'Heroes'" as "an immortal track all about fleeting wonders", while Ultimate Classic Rock's Allison Rapp found that over time, the track became "one of rock's most-loved anthems of hope". In a list ranking every Bowie single from worst to best, the same publication placed it at number one. In Consequence of Sound, Lior Phillips stated that the track "expertly captures the hopeless reality that nothing lasts and that we all must die — and also the inherent beauty in the fact that we all live and love in our time despite that fact". Moby has said that "'Heroes'" is one of his favourite songs ever written, finding it "inevitable" that his music would be influenced by the song, while Depeche Mode's lead singer Dave Gahan was hired into the band when founder Vince Clarke heard him singing it at a jam session. In his 2023 book Discover UK Shoegaze and Dream Pop, the author Vernon Joynson cited "'Heroes'" as showcasing an early form of shoegaze, stating that the song features "the type of noisy production with distorted and reverberated guitars and a dreamy hazy atmosphere all of which became key ingredients of shoegaze".

Like critics, Bowie's biographers praise "'Heroes'" as a classic and one of Bowie's best tracks, (Note: Attributed to multiple references:) with the author Paul Trynka calling it "his simplest, most affecting and most memorable song". Buckley acknowledges it as Bowie's "most universally admired song" and in 2015, wrote that the song "is perhaps pop's definitive statement of the potential triumph of the human spirit over adversity". O'Leary states that the song is "Bowie at his most empathic and desperate; a wish-chant that offers a tiny regency for the spirit". Despite this, biographers mostly pan the shortened single edit for diminishing the song's power. (Note: Attributed to multiple references:) O'Leary argues that the edit weakens the song as the buildup to the final verses is shortened, noting that Bowie's "heroic" vocal starts roughly two minutes earlier than the full album version. Perone agrees that the edit, which starts at the "dolphins" lyric, destroys the song's pacing, tension and impact, making it "not make as much sense". He further criticised the decision to shorten the single, noting that other highly successful singles of the rock era, such as the Beatles' "Hey Jude" (1968), were longer than the full-length version of "'Heroes'".

Following Bowie's death in January 2016, Rolling Stone named "'Heroes'" one of the 30 most essential songs of Bowie's catalogue. Likewise, numerous publications have considered the song one of Bowie's finest, with NME, Uncut and Smooth Radio labelling it his greatest. Others including Consequence of Sound, Digital Spy and Mojo, named it his second best, behind "Life on Mars?" (1971). In 2018, the readers of NME voted the song Bowie's fourth best track. The Guardian's Alexis Petridis placed it at number five in a list ranking Bowie's 50 greatest songs in 2020. He recognised the track as a "weird, ambiguous song" with an "uplifting sporting-montage-soundtrack ubiquity" that turns six minutes of "pulsing electronic noise, howling guitars and screamed vocals" into "an all-purpose air-punching anthem".

=== Accolades ===
In ensuing decades, "'Heroes'" has appeared on lists of the greatest songs of all time. In a list of the 100 greatest singles of all time, NME placed it at number five. In a similar list, Uncut found it the 16th best single from the post-punk era. In 2004, Rolling Stone rated "'Heroes'" number 46 in its list of the 500 Greatest Songs of All Time, and later moving the song up to number 23 on the 2021 list. NME placed it at number 15 in their similar 2014 list. Time included it in their 2011 list of the "All-Time 100 Songs", while Pitchfork featured the song in The Pitchfork 500, a 2008 guide to the 500 greatest songs from punk to the present. In lists ranking the best songs of the 1970s, NME and Pitchfork listed the song at numbers four and six, respectively. The UK's Radio X also ranked it the 12th best song of all time in 2010, and the seventh best British song in 2016.

=== Later chart success ===
Shortly after Bowie's death, the song charted in numerous countries worldwide and became his most-streamed track on Spotify. In the UK, it reached a new peak of number 12. The song spent two weeks on Billboard's Hot Rock & Alternative Songs chart in the US, peaking at number 11. Its highest positions were number three on Billboard's Euro Digital Song Sales chart, number eight in Scotland and number nine in France. Elsewhere, "'Heroes'" charted in Italy (17), Switzerland (17), Japan (18), Germany (19), Ireland (29), Portugal (32), Australia (36), Sweden (37) and Spain (59). In Italy, the song was certified gold by the Federation of the Italian Music Industry. "'Héros'" also peaked at number 37 in France in 2015.

== Live performances ==
"'Heroes'" remained a staple throughout Bowie's concert tours. He later acknowledged the song's impact on live audiences: "In Europe, it is one of the ones that seemed to have special resonance." During the 1978 Isolar II and 1983 Serious Moonlight tours, the song was usually the second number performed rather than among the shows' encores. Performances from the former have seen release on Stage (1978) and Welcome to the Blackout (2018), while some from the latter appeared on its 1984 concert video and later on Serious Moonlight (Live '83), released as part of the 2018 box set Loving the Alien (1983–1988), and separately the following year. Following Live Aid, Bowie revived "'Heroes'" for the 1987 Glass Spider Tour, as seen in its accompanying concert video (1988). The performance on 6 June 1987 at the German Reichstag in West Berlin has been considered a catalyst to the later fall of the Berlin Wall. Bowie called it "one of the most emotional performances I've ever done" in 2003. The song made subsequent appearances during the 1990 Sound+Vision, 1996–1997 Earthling, 2000 Mini, 2002 Heathen and 2003–2004 A Reality tours. A performance from the A Reality Tour saw release on the accompanying DVD and live album, released in 2004 and 2010, respectively. Another from the Montreux Jazz Festival on 18 July 2002 was released on the box set I Can't Give Everything Away (2002–2016) in 2025.

Outside his tours, "'Heroes'" was performed at The Freddie Mercury Tribute Concert in 1992 by Bowie, his former guitarist Mick Ronson and the surviving members of Queen – Brian May, Roger Taylor and John Deacon. Bowie played a semi-acoustic version at the 1996 Bridge School benefit concerts; the 20 October rendition was released on The Bridge School Concerts Vol. 1 album and The Bridge School Concerts 25th Anniversary Edition DVD. The song was also sung at his 50th birthday concert in January 1997, at the Glastonbury Festival in June 2000, which was released in 2018 on Glastonbury 2000, and a performance two days later at the BBC Radio Theatre, which went unreleased until the Brilliant Adventure (1992–2001) box set in 2021. The song was again performed in 2001 at the Tibet House Benefit concert and the Concert for New York City.

== Cover versions and tributes ==
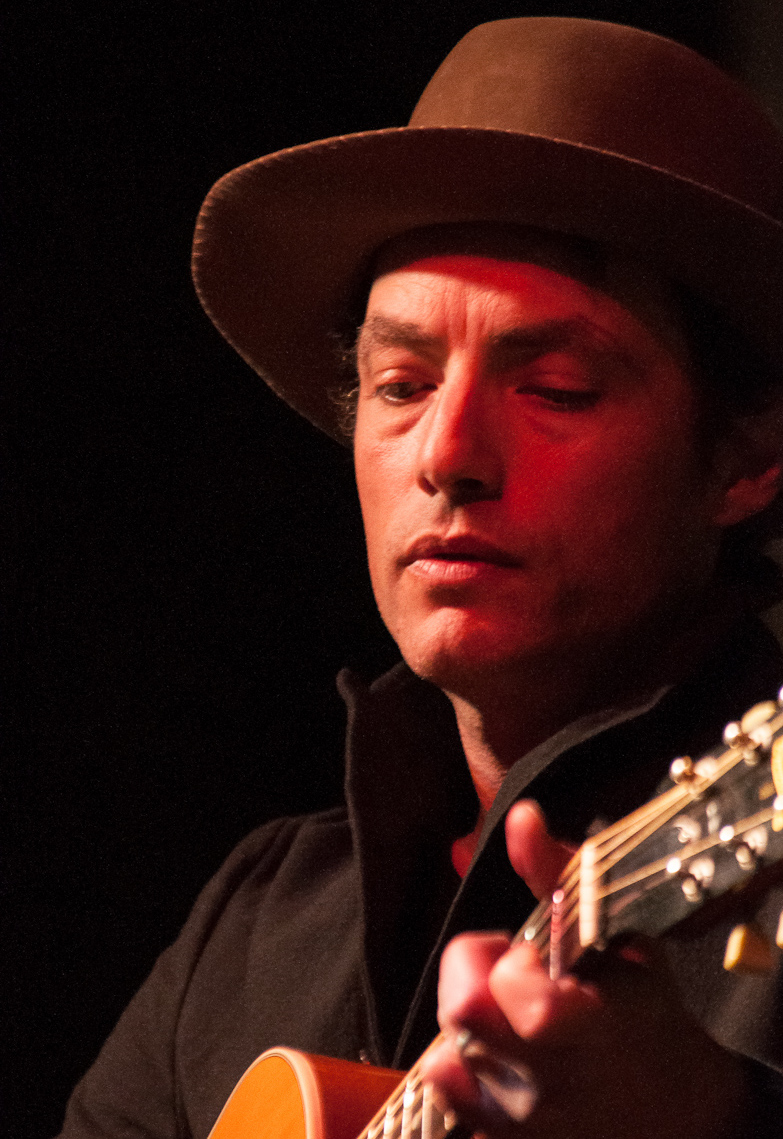
A cover version of "'Heroes'" by the Wallflowers (lead singer Jakob Dylan pictured in 2012) charted in the US and Canada in 1998.

"'Heroes'" is cited by Pegg as Bowie's most covered song after "Rebel Rebel" (1974). Artists who have covered the song on stage or in the studio include Nico, the Smashing Pumpkins, Travis, Arcade Fire and Blondie, whose 1980 live version featured Fripp on guitar. In 1997, Oasis recorded a cover of the single version, which appeared as a B-side of their single "D'You Know What I Mean?" It was sung by Noel Gallagher, who wrote in his diary that the song connected with him because "it actually said something" with the lyrics "We can be heroes / just for one day". The Wallflowers recorded a version for the soundtrack to the 1998 monster film Godzilla. This version, released as a single on 21 April 1998, peaked at number 10 on the US Billboard Modern Rock Tracks chart in 1998, as well as number 27 on the Billboard Hot 100 Airplay chart and number 23 on the Billboard Mainstream Top 40 chart. In Canada, the single topped the RPM Alternative 30 for six weeks and reached number 13 on the RPM Top Singles chart. British duo Dom and Nic directed the song's music video. The Wallflowers' cover was positively received, with Billboard editor Larry Flick writing that it "beautifully illuminates the heart-tugging quality of the lyrics" but noting the lead singer Jakob Dylan failed to replicate the "irony and edge" of Bowie's version. Artists who have covered "'Helden'" include Apocalyptica, Letzte Instanz and David Hasselhoff.

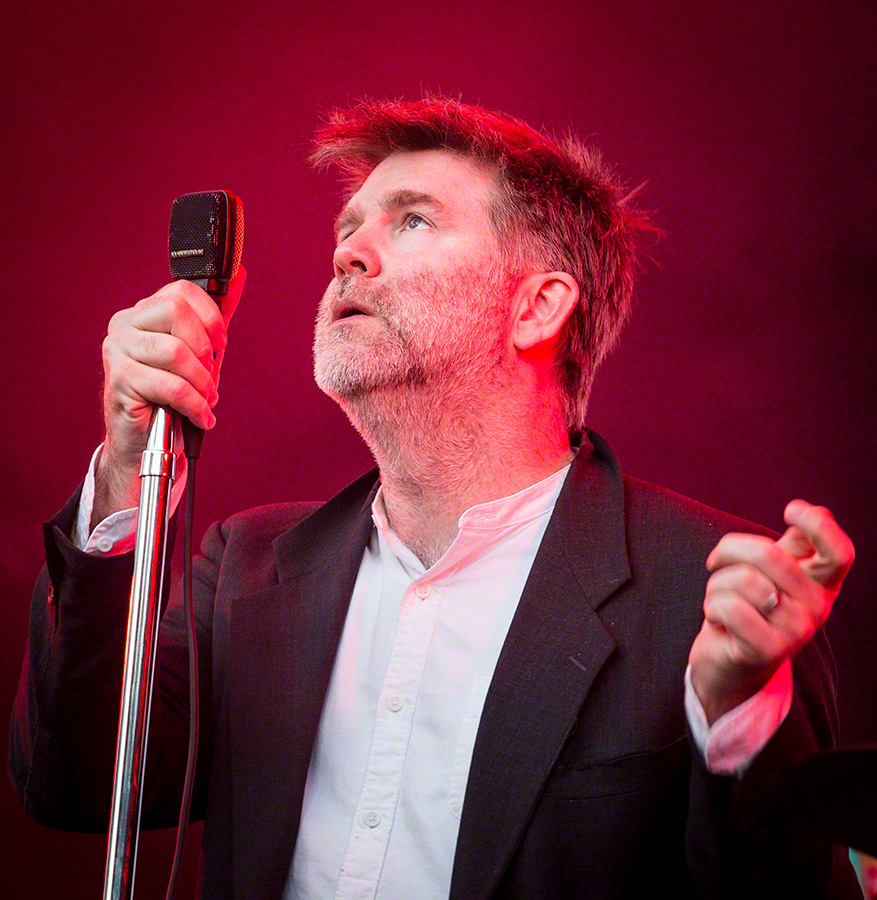
The LCD Soundsystem (frontman James Murphy pictured) track "All I Want" is a tribute to "'Heroes'".

In 1997, the American composer Philip Glass adapted the "Heroes" album into a classical music symphony, titled "Heroes" Symphony, utilising the title track as the root for the first movement. The same year, Aphex Twin remixed Bowie's original vocal onto Glass's adaptation for release on a Japanese 3-inch CD single. The LCD Soundsystem song "All I Want" (2010) is directly based on, and is dubbed a tribute to, "'Heroes'". Pitchfork writer Ryan Dombal dubbed it "the ultimate tribute, finer than a million covers".

At Bowie's own request, TV on the Radio covered "'Heroes'" in 2009 for the charity album War Child Heroes. A year later, Peter Gabriel released a stripped-down version for his covers album Scratch My Back (2010). The same year, the series 7 finalists of The X Factor released a version for the Help for Heroes charity, which reached number one on the Irish, Scottish and UK Singles Chart. Pegg panned this version as introducing "a new generation to David Bowie by subjecting one of his greatest songs to the anodyne arrangements, Eurovision key-changes and sub-Mariah Carey karaoke yodeling which are the core ingredients of The X Factor's ongoing mission to eradicate real music from planet earth".

Following Bowie's death, "'Heroes'" became a favourite at tribute events and was covered by artists such as Coldplay, Blondie, Lady Gaga and Prince, who performed the track regularly shortly before his own death in 2016. On Twitter, the German Foreign Office paid homage to Bowie for "helping to bring down the Wall". Depeche Mode subsequently released a cover to commemorate the song's 40th anniversary, with Dave Gahan stating, "Bowie is the one artist who I've stuck with since I was in my early teens. His albums are always my go-to on tour and covering 'Heroes' is paying homage to Bowie." King Crimson, who had added the song to their live set in 2000 when the band consisted of former Bowie players Fripp and Adrian Belew, recorded a version for their five-track EP Heroes: Live in Europe 2016. Motörhead also released a version on their 2017 album Under Cöver, which was recorded in 2015 during the recording sessions for Bad Magic, and one of the last songs recorded before Lemmy's death that same year. Also in 2017, a cover by the Australian band Gang of Youths was featured in the trailers for the film Justice League. Further covers have been released by Hollywood Vampires for their album Rise (2019), sung by Johnny Depp; Neil Finn in 2020 during the COVID-19 lockdowns; and previous Bowie collaborator Moby in 2021 for his album Reprise. David Byrne, St. Vincent and Arcade Fire performed "'Heroes'" as a medley with Arcade Fire's "Wake Up" during Saturday Night Live's 50th Anniversary concert at Radio City Music Hall on 14 February 2025.

== Usage in media ==
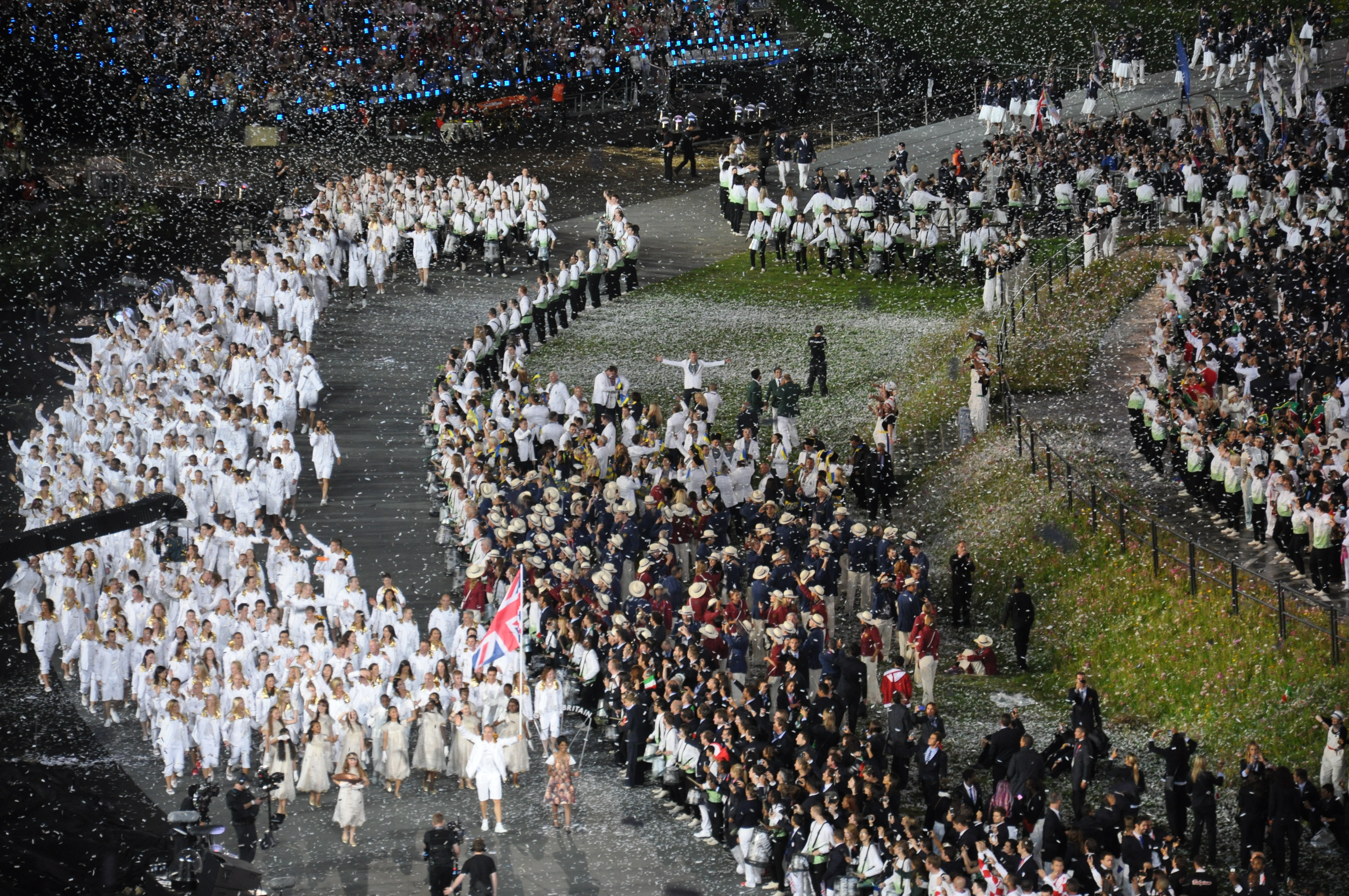
The athletes of Great Britain entering the Olympic Stadium during the opening ceremony of the 2012 Summer Olympics. "'Heroes'" was played during the event.

Bowie allowed "'Heroes'" to be used in advertising campaigns throughout his lifetime, from ads for cell phones, cars and software, to HBO Latin America programming, musical video games and sporting events. One such event was the opening ceremony of the 2012 Summer Olympics, where it was played as the British team entered the Olympic Stadium. In 2001, the song appeared in three prominent feature films: Antitrust, Moulin Rouge! and The Parole Officer.

On television, the song has made appearances in Glee (2012), the US version of The Tomorrow People (2014) and Regular Show (2017), and on soundtrack albums for Heroes and Ninja Assassin (2009). Gabriel's version was used in two episodes of the Netflix series Stranger Things in 2016 and 2019, while Bowie's original played during the end credits in the final episode of the show. The song's usage came from one of the show's actors, Joe Keery, who believed the song would be a "perfect way" to conclude the series. Following its appearance in the final episode, the song experienced a significant spike of almost 500 percent on streaming services. Bowie's original was also featured in the film The Perks of Being a Wallflower (2012), and in the premiere trailer for the Brazilian film Praia do Futuro (2014). Five years later, "'Helden'" was played at the end of Jojo Rabbit.

In 1998, the song featured in the video game NHL 99 as part of the first half of the game's intro. In 2007, a cover version of "'Heroes'" was made available as downloadable content for the Rock Band rhythm game series, as part of the "David Bowie Track Pack 01". The pack also includes "Moonage Daydream" (1972) and a cover version of "Queen Bitch" (1971).

== Personnel ==
According to Chris O'Leary and Benoît Clerc:

- David Bowie – lead and backing vocals, piano, ARP Solina String Ensemble, Chamberlin
- Robert Fripp – lead guitar
- Carlos Alomar – rhythm guitar
- George Murray – bass
- Dennis Davis – drums
- Brian Eno – EMS Synthi AKS, guitar treatments
- Tony Visconti – metal canister, backing vocals, tambourine

Technical

- David Bowie – producer
- Tony Visconti – producer, engineer, mixer (Hansa Studios)
- Colin Thurston – engineer, mixer (Hansa Studios)
- Eduard Meyer, Michael Zimmerling, Peter Burgon – assistant engineers (Hansa Studios)
- David Richards, Eugene Chaplin – assistant engineers (Mountain Studios)

== Charts ==
=== David Bowie version ===
==== Weekly charts ====
1977–78 weekly chart performance
Chart (1977–78)	Peak position
Australia (Kent Music Report)	11
Austria (Ö3 Austria Top 40)	14
Belgium (Ultratop 50 Flanders)	17
Ireland (IRMA)	8
Netherlands (Dutch Top 40)	8
Netherlands (Single Top 100)	9
New Zealand (Recorded Music NZ)	34
UK Singles (Official Charts)	24
US Record World Singles Chart 101–150	126

2016 weekly chart performance
Chart (2016)	Peak position
Australia (ARIA)	36
Euro Digital Song Sales (Billboard)	3
France (SNEP)	9
Germany (GfK)	19
Ireland (IRMA)	27
Italy (FIMI)	17
Japan Hot Overseas (Billboard)	18
Portugal (AFP)	32
Scottish Singles Sales (Official Charts)	8
Spain (Promusicae)	59
Sweden (Sverigetopplistan)	37
Switzerland (Schweizer Hitparade)	17
UK Singles (Official Charts)	12
US Hot Rock & Alternative Songs (Billboard)	11

==== Year-end charts ====
Chart (1977)	Position
Netherlands (Dutch Top 40)	68
Netherlands (Single Top 100)	79

=== The Wallflowers version ===
==== Weekly charts ====
Weekly chart performance
Chart (1998)	Peak position
Australia (ARIA)	38
Canada Top Singles (RPM)	13
Canada Adult Contemporary (RPM)	28
Canada Rock/Alternative (RPM)	1
Germany (GfK)	85
Iceland (Íslenski Listinn Topp 40)	21
US Radio Songs (Billboard)	27
US Adult Alternative Airplay (Billboard)	3
US Adult Pop Airplay (Billboard)	20
US Alternative Airplay (Billboard)	9
US Mainstream Rock Airplay (Billboard)	4
US Pop Airplay (Billboard)	23

==== Year-end charts ====
Year-end chart performance
Chart (1998)	Position
Canada Top Singles (RPM)	62
Canada Rock/Alternative (RPM)	5
US Adult Top 40 (Billboard)	73
US Mainstream Rock Tracks (Billboard)	43
US Modern Rock Tracks (Billboard)	51
US Triple-A (Billboard)	37

== Certifications ==
Sales certifications
Region	Certification	Certified units/sales
Denmark (IFPI Danmark) digital sales since 2011	Platinum	90,000^{‡}
Italy (FIMI) sales since 2009	Gold	25,000^{‡}
New Zealand (RMNZ)	3× Platinum	90,000^{‡}
Spain (Promusicae)	Platinum	60,000^{‡}
United Kingdom (BPI) digital sales since 2004	2× Platinum	1,200,000^{‡}
^{‡} Sales+streaming figures based on certification alone.
