= Owl (band) =

Los Angeles-based hard rock band

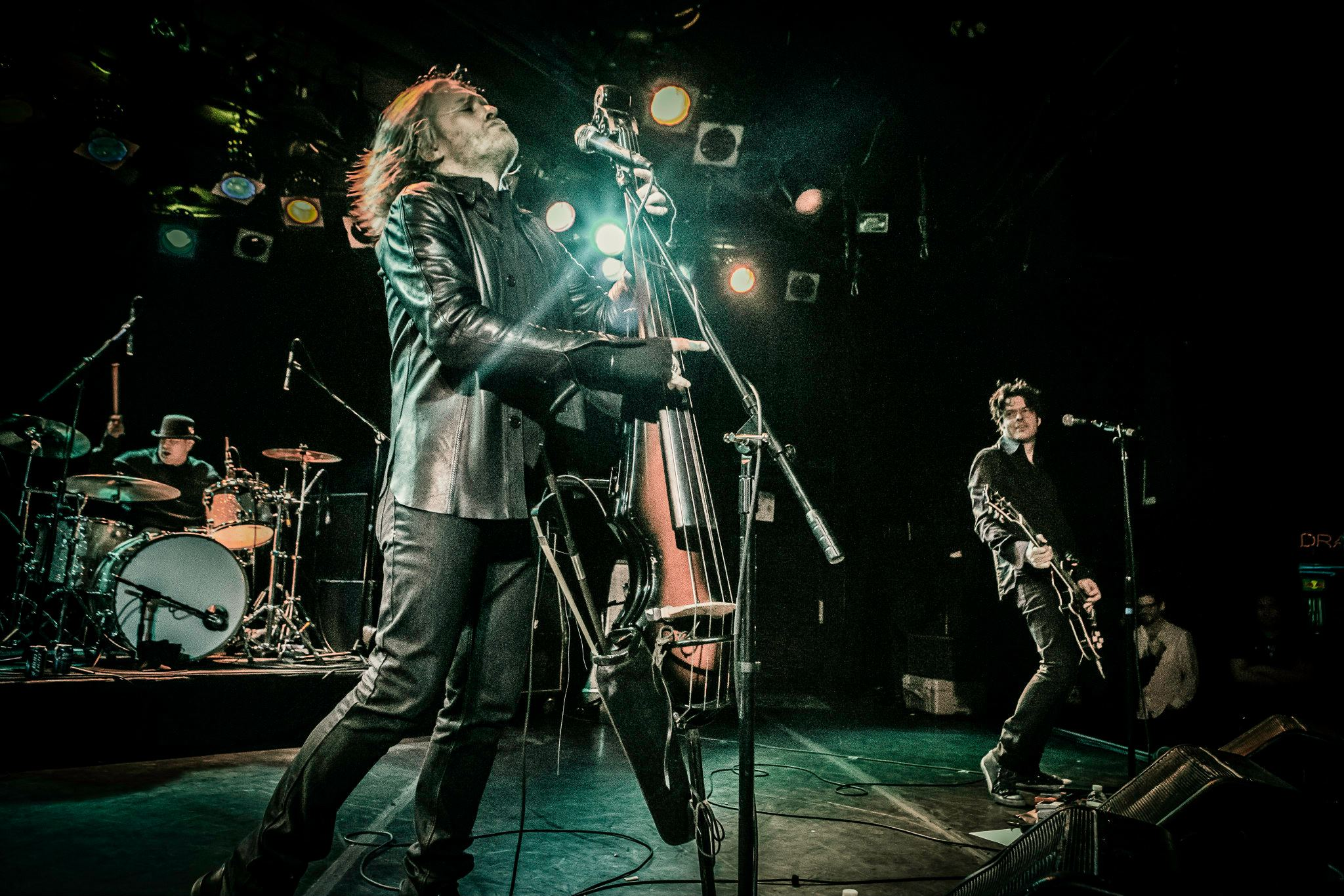
- Owl performing in 2015

Background information
- Origin: Los Angeles, California
- Genres: Hard rock experimental rock alternative rock
- Years active: 2007–present
- Labels: Overit Records, Magnetic Eye Records
- Members: Chris Wyse; Dan Dinsmore; Eric Bradley
- Past members: Jason Achilles Mezilis
- Website: www.owltheband.net

Owl is a three piece Los Angeles-based hard rock band formed in 2007. Led by vocalist/bassist Chris Wyse, the long-time bassist for the Cult and a member of Ace Frehley's band, Owl released their eponymous debut in 2009, their second album, The Right Thing, in 2013 and a third album, Things You Can't See, in 2015.

== History ==
Wyse began playing bass while in grade school in upstate New York. As a teenager, he met drummer Dan Dinsmore, then 17; shortly thereafter, they began playing together in a local band, East Wall. After touring regionally, Wyse, who had garnered national attention as a bass player, moved to Los Angeles, while Dinsmore remained in Albany, joining the industrial rock band The Clay People.

Wyse's success came quickly in Los Angeles, where he played with Guns N' Roses' Chris Pitman, Tool's Paul D'Amour, Tal Bachman, Mick Jagger, Scott Weiland, and Ozzy Osbourne before joining the Cult in 2006. Dinsmore's band also achieved significant success, particularly with the single Awake, from the Strangeland soundtrack which hit #1 on the metal charts. When the Clay People went on hiatus in 2001, Dinsmore continued his career as a drummer, playing with producer Mike Clink, known for his work with Metallica, among others.

In 2002, Wyse met guitarist Jason Achilles Mezilis through a mutual friend. A classically trained pianist, Mezilis had recently graduated from the University of California, Berkeley with a Bachelor of Arts in Music. After graduation, he interned at several prominent recording studios and played guitar with Los Angeles bands, including Your Horrible Smile. In 2011, Mezilis founded Organic Audio Recorders, a boutique analog & digital recording studio in downtown Los Angeles.

An early version of Owl was formed in 2001 to recorded a cover of "Behind The Sun" for the record Flammable: A Tribute To the Red Hot Chili Peppers. In reviewing the album, All Music Guide wrote "Owl's version of "Behind the Sun" is appropriately trippy, and even replicates Flea's dominating bassline with aplomb."

In 2007, Wyse, Mezilis and Dinsmore once again came together as Owl. Although Wyse occasionally performed on the upright bass with the Cult, with Owl, it became his trademark; playing with a bow, and using delays and sound effects techniques, Wyse uses the bass as a lead instrument. In a 2013 interview, Wyse responded to a question regarding the motivation behind the group. "There would be no other format like this unless I created it. When I was a kid people used to say "you can't play bass like that!," he stated. "Rock music is not supposed to have rules. That's the whole point. As soon as I hear about all the rules a band has I get turned off because they are worried about being cool and not a being vibrant artist. I don't want to fit into anyone's idea. I want to show you new ones." Wyse, who is also Owl's main songwriter and vocalist, produced Owl's self-titled debut, which was recorded at Matt Sorum's Drac Studios in Los Angeles and released in 2009. The band supported the record, which was described as a "swirling epic," through a video for the track "Pusher" and through live performances, including shows with Helmet, Jet, In This Moment and Hollywood All Star rock collective Camp Freddy.

Owl began writing what would become the band's self-produced album The Right Thing in early 2011, recording at Matt Sorum's Drac Studios in Los Angeles. In addition, Owl recorded at Overit Studios in upstate New York, a studio Dinsmore opened in conjunction with Overit Media, a media and marketing company he founded in 1993. Deemed a "no nonsense hard rock album with stadium sized hooks," The Right Thing was released on April 9, 2013, on Overit Records and Magnetic Eye Records as a joint release. The first video from the album, "The Right Thing,"premiered on Rolling Stone's website; it was followed by "Destroyer" and "Perfect."

A third album, Things You Can't See, was released in the summer of 2015. Bass Player wrote it was Owl's "boldest and most experimental album." A video for the song "Lake Ego" was released in 2017. It was followed by a performance video for the title track in 2018.

== Discography ==
=== Studio albums ===
- Owl (2009)
- The Right Thing (2013)
- Things You Can't See (2015)

== Videography ==
- Pusher (2009)
- Perfect (2013)
- Destroyer (2013)
- The Right Thing (2013)
- Who's Gonna Save You Now (2015)
- Lake Ego (2017)
- Things You Can't See (2018)
