= Alberto Denti di Pirajno =

Italian writer and doctor (1886–1968)

Alberto Denti di Pirajno (7 March 1886 – 15 January 1968) was an Italian writer, medical doctor, and gastronome. He is now best known for his 1955 book, A Cure for Serpents.

== Biography ==
Alberto Denti, Duke of Pirajno, was born in La Spezia in 1886. He was educated at the University of Florence and spent almost twenty years (1924–1942) as the personal physician of the Duke of Aosta. He was the governor of Tripoli, the capital of Libya, from 1941 until 1943, when he surrendered the city to British forces. His first novel, Ippolita, was awarded the "Orio Vergani" prize.

Alberto Denti died in Rome in 1968.

The lyrics of the David Bowie song "Heroes" (1977) were partly inspired by his book 'A Grave For A Dolphin', one of Bowie's favorite books.

== Works ==
- A Cure for Serpents (1955).
- A Grave for a Dolphin (1956).
- Ippolita (1961).
- The Love Song of Mara Lumera (1964).
