= Juan Azulay =

American architect

Juan Azulay (born February 29, 1972) is a director, media artist, author and designer. As a director and media artist, he is known for his collaboration work with British band The Cult, Icelandic art rock band Sigur Rós, No Wave Legend Lydia Lunch and his directing work alongside Oscar-winner cinematographer Guillermo Navarro. His design work and films have received over a dozen recognized awards in competition and his work has been included in prestigious exhibitions like the 2011 Ville Fertile at Cite de l'Architecture et Patrimoine in Paris and is part of the permanent collection at the MAK in Vienna. Azulay's work is produced through a creative practice called MTTR MGMT, of which he is the creative director.

== Film and Media Arts work ==
- "Flood Stains" with Lydia Lunch. Credited as writer and director. 2010
- "The Blue of Noon" with Maurice Compte. Credited as writer and director. 2011
- "Raven". Starring Deezer D. Credited as director. 2011
- "Blue Eyed Sailor" with Guillermo Navarro and Mia Maestro ~ Music Video. 2012
- "Let Me Be Your Light" with The Black Ryder ~ Music Video. 2015
- "Rumors" with The Bulls ~ Music Video. 2015
- "Dark Energy" with The Cult ~ Lyric Video. 2015
- "Deeply Ordered Chaos" with The Cult ~ Lyric Video. 2015
- "Hinterland" with The Cult ~ Music Video. 2016
- "G O A T" with The Cult ~ Music Video. 2016
- "Sound Bath" with Sigur Rós ~ Visual Media Live Show. 2017
- "Norður og Niður: Liminal Sound Bath" with Sigur Rós and Alex Somers ~ Visual Media Live Show. 2017
- "Form 2018 at Arcosanti" with Sigur Rós and Alex Somers ~ Visual Media Live Show. 2018
- "Give Me Mercy" with The Cult ~ Music Video. 2022
- "Mirror" with The Cult ~ Music Video 2022
- "Vendetta X" with The Cult ~ Music Video. 2023.
- "Solomun at the Vegas Sphere: Glory Box" with Solomun and Anyma ~ Live Show. 2025

== Design work ==
- "Aquatic Terrarium for the New Barcelona Zoo" in the Universal Forum of Cultures of 2004 in Barcelona, Spain. 2000
- "Clifton Middle School" in Monrovia, California. 2003
- "Northview Gymnasium" in Duarte, California. 2005
- "3x1 Housing Project" in Hollywood, California. 2006
- "Glendale Satellite Library" in Glendale, California. 2007
- "MAK t6 Vacant" at the MAK Center Vienna. 2008
- "Master Plan for Shaoxing, China" in Shaoxing, China. 2009
- "Vivarium" at the Southern California Institute of Architecture. 2010
- "7918 Tower" in Miami, Florida. 2017
