= Hollywood Vampires (band) =

American rock band

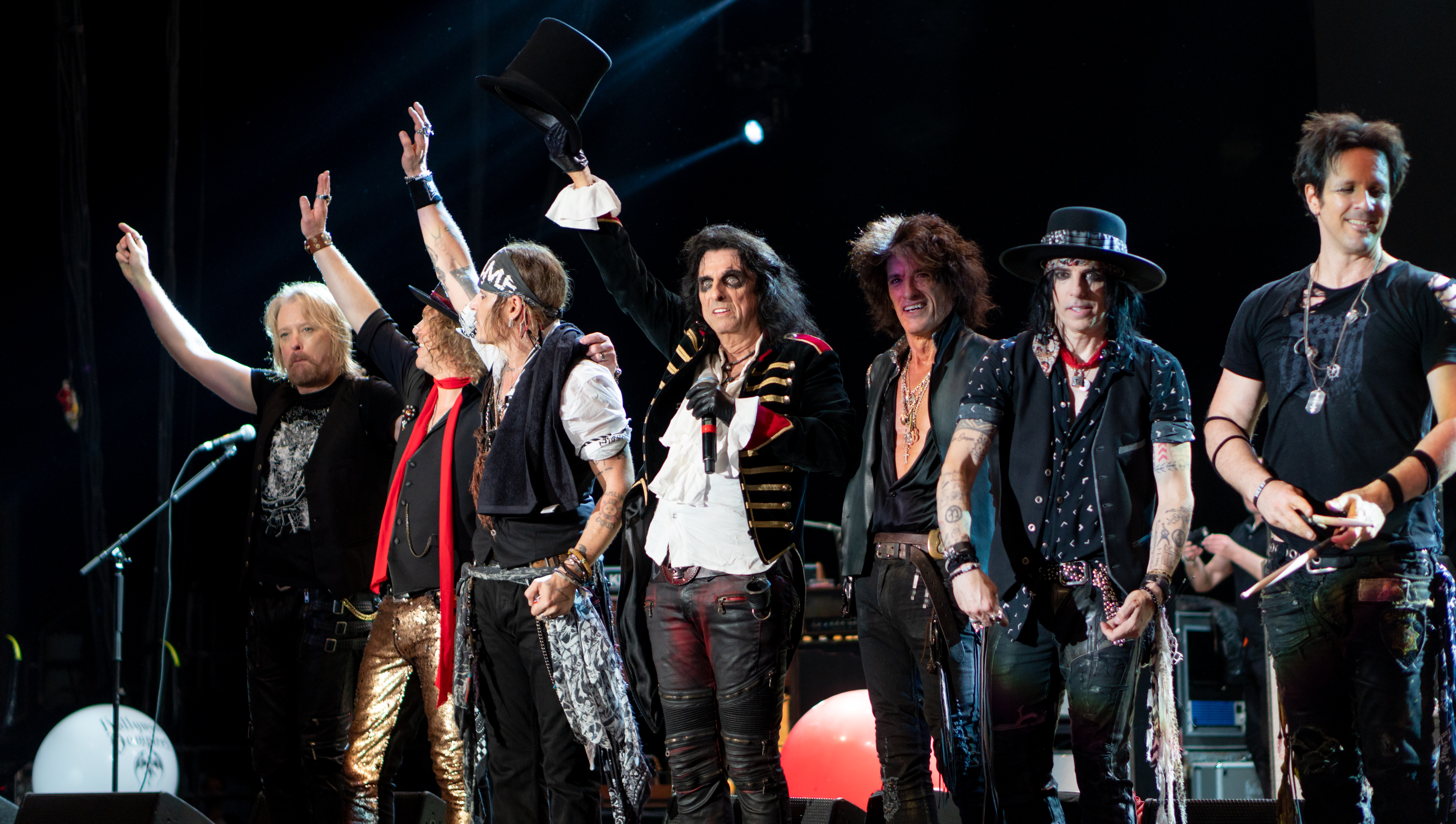
- Hollywood Vampires at Wembley Arena on June 20, 2018. (L-R: Chris Wyse, Buck Johnson, Johnny Depp, Alice Cooper, Joe Perry, Tommy Henriksen and Glen Sobel)

Background information
- Origin: Los Angeles, California, U.S.
- Genres: Hard rock; glam rock; arena rock; blues rock; heavy metal
- Years active: 2012–present
- Labels: Republic; earMUSIC
- Members: Alice Cooper; Johnny Depp; Joe Perry; Tommy Henriksen
- Website: hollywoodvampires.com

Hollywood Vampires is an American rock supergroup formed in 2012 by singer Alice Cooper, actor Johnny Depp, and Aerosmith guitarist Joe Perry. The band name derives from The Hollywood Vampires, a celebrity drinking club formed by Cooper in the 1970s, including John Lennon, Harry Nilsson, Keith Moon of the Who, and Micky Dolenz of the Monkees. Touring members include or have included Duff McKagan and Matt Sorum of Guns N' Roses fame, as well as Robert DeLeo from Stone Temple Pilots.

The band has released two studio albums featuring guest appearances by Paul McCartney, Dave Grohl, Joe Walsh, Zak Starkey and Christopher Lee, among others.

== Origins ==
The band takes its name from a drinking club consisting of mainly Cooper, John Lennon, Keith Moon, Ringo Starr, Micky Dolenz and Harry Nilsson. The mission of the original Hollywood Vampires was to drink until no one could stand up. This took place during the height of Cooper's drinking in the 1970s. Cooper talks in more detail about the Rainbow Bar incarnation of the Hollywood Vampires in the 1991 video biography Prime Cuts.

== Live performances ==
The group's debut live performances were held at Roxy Theatre (West Hollywood) in Los Angeles on September 16 and 17, 2015. The three core members were accompanied by bassist Duff McKagan, drummer Matt Sorum, rhythm guitarist Tommy Henriksen, and Bruce Witkin on keyboards and additional guitar. Guest performers for both nights were Tom Morello, Geezer Butler, Perry Farrell, Zak Starkey, and Kesha, and Marilyn Manson guesting on the second night. The next week, the group performed at Brazil's Rock in Rio festival on September 24, 2015, and was webcast live by AOL. Guest performers were Lzzy Hale, Zak Starkey, and Andreas Kisser.

In February 2016, the group performed at the Grammy Award ceremony as a tribute to Lemmy, who had died at the end of 2015. The group also announced their first concert tour, which began at Turning Stone Resort & Casino on May 24. The group was scheduled to make their first late-night television appearance on The Late Show with Stephen Colbert on July 11, 2016; however, lead guitarist and co-founder Perry collapsed on stage during a performance on July 10. The band continued to perform without Perry prior to his return to the tour on July 22. The group made their first late-night television appearance on Jimmy Kimmel Live! on June 19, 2019.

In June 2022, the band announced a new tour that took place in Europe in the summer of 2023. On April 3, 2023, the band announced additional dates of the tour to take place in the United States in late May and early June; however, those dates were later rescheduled to late July after Johnny Depp suffered an ankle injury.

On July 30, 2023, the band played at Bethel Woods Center for the Arts in Bethel, New York, the site of the 1969 Woodstock Festival, which was the last show of their 2023 tour. The 2023 tour featured Alice Cooper, Johnny Depp, Joe Perry, and Tommy Henriksen.

In 2026, the Hollywood Vampires undertook a 19 date European tour, featuring the now-regular line-up of Alice Cooper, Johnny Depp, Joe Perry, and Tommy Henriksen.

== Band members ==
Current members

- Alice Cooper – lead and backing vocals, harmonica, rhythm guitar, percussion (2012–present)
- Johnny Depp – slide, rhythm and lead guitar, backing and lead vocals, keyboards (2012–present)
- Joe Perry – lead and rhythm guitar, backing and lead vocals (2012–present)
- Tommy Henriksen – rhythm and lead guitar, keyboards, backing and lead vocals, (2015–present; touring 2012–2015)

Current touring musicians

- Glen Sobel – drums (2017–present)
- Chris Wyse – bass guitar, double bass, backing and lead vocals (2018–present)
- Buck Johnson – keyboards, acoustic, rhythm and lead guitar, backing vocals (2018–present)

Former touring musicians

- Duff McKagan – bass guitar, backing vocals (2015–2016)
- Brad Whitford – rhythm and lead guitar (2017)
- Matt Sorum – drums, backing and lead vocals (2015–2017)
- Bruce Witkin – bass guitar, keyboards, rhythm and lead guitar, percussion, backing and lead vocals (2015–2017)
- Robert DeLeo – bass guitar, backing vocals (2016–2017)

Session musicians

- Bruce Witkin – bass guitar, keyboards, rhythm and lead guitar, percussion, backing and lead vocals (2012–2015)
- Glen Sobel – drums (2012–2015)
- Tommy Henriksen – rhythm and lead guitar, keyboards, bass guitar, backing vocals (2012–2019)

=== Timeline ===
This is an approximate timeline of Hollywood Vampires members and their touring band.

== Discography ==
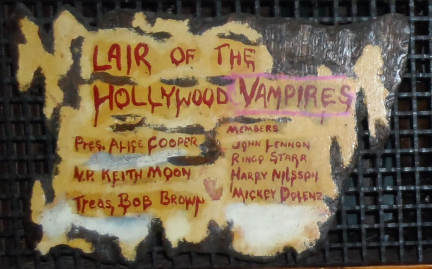
A plaque at the Rainbow Bar and Grill in West Hollywood which honors the drinking club

Studio albums

- Hollywood Vampires (2015)
- Rise (2019)

Live albums

- Live in Rio (2023)
- At Montreux Jazz Festival (2026)
