= Rainbow Bar and Grill =

Bar and restaurant/grocery store in California, United States

- The Rainbow
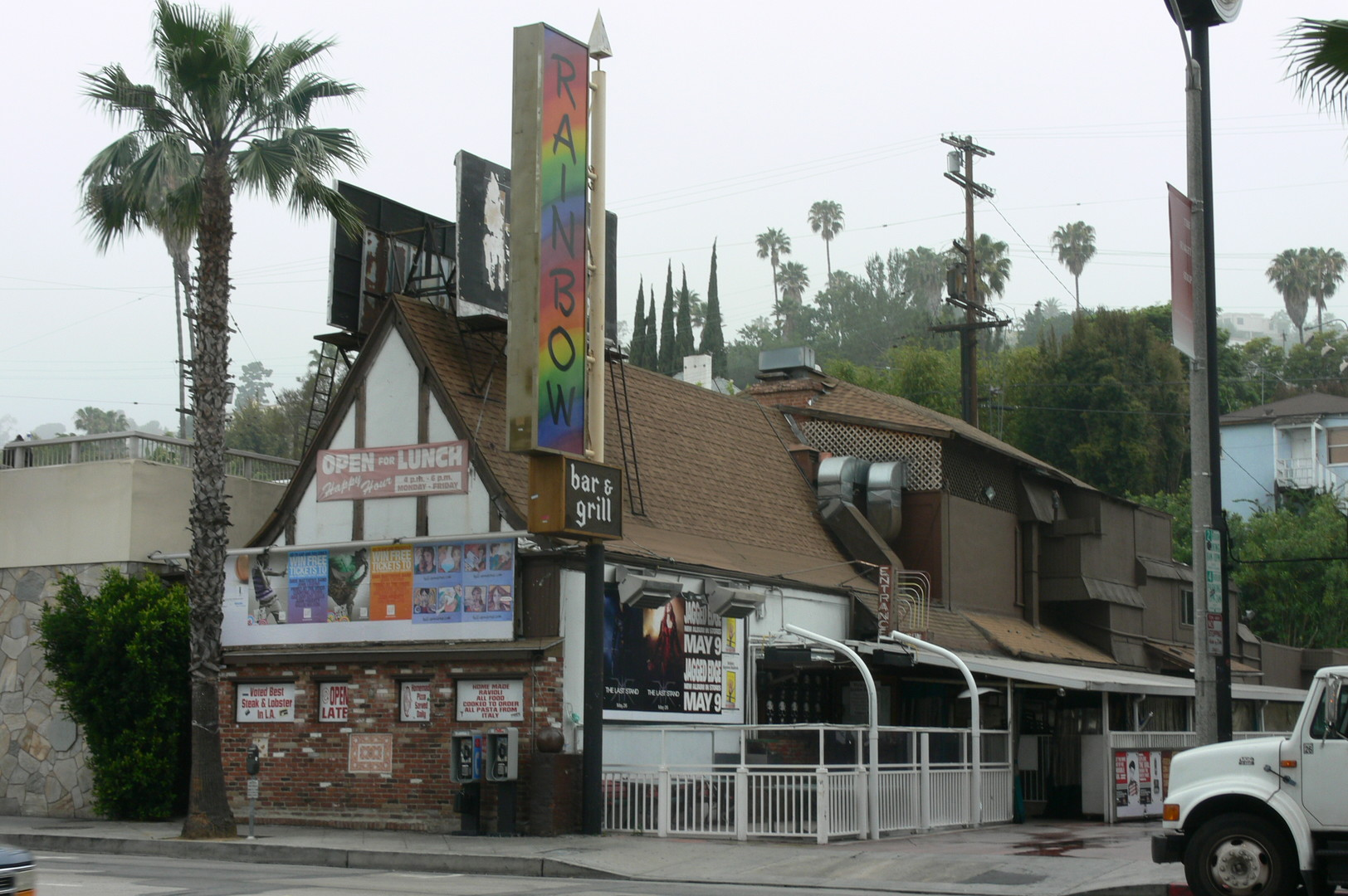
- Interactive map of Rainbow Bar and Grill
- Address: 9015 Sunset Boulevard
- Location: West Hollywood, California
- Coordinates: 34.090621°N 118.388318°W
- Type: Nightclub
- Events: Rock, heavy metal, glam rock, glam metal

Construction
- Opened: 1972

Website
- rainbowbarandgrill.com

The Rainbow Bar and Grill is a bar and restaurant on the Sunset Strip in West Hollywood, California, United States, adjacent to the border of Beverly Hills, California. Its address is 9015 Sunset Boulevard.

The bottom level of the building is The Rainbow Bar and Grill restaurant. Upstairs is a club called "Over the Rainbow" with a full bar, a dance floor and a DJ booth, later continuing to offer live entertainment on some days of the week. The restaurant is next to The Roxy Theatre and on the next block is Keys Nightclub, (formerly 1 OAK, Gazzarri's; Billboard Live, and The Key Club}.

== History ==
Before becoming the Rainbow, the restaurant was the Villa Nova restaurant, which was originally owned by film director Vincente Minnelli, at the time married to Judy Garland. Joe DiMaggio and Marilyn Monroe met at the restaurant on a blind date in 1952, and later married.

After operating for 28 years, Villa Nova closed in 1968, and the building re-opened as the Windjammer, and closed in 1971.

The restaurant was founded in early 1972 by Gary Stromberg and Bob Gibson, heads of the PR firm Gibson & Stromberg. They brought in co-owners Elmer Valentine, Lou Adler, Mario Maglieri and others, opening in late March with a Buddah Records party for NRBQ. On April 16, there was a party for Elton John. At the time, the word "rainbow" signified peace and freedom. It quickly became known as a hangout for celebrities of all types. John Belushi ate his last meal (lentil soup) at table No. 16. The pornography actor Ron Jeremy was also known to regularly hang out there in the 2000s and 2010s. For many years, the owner was Mario Maglieri.

The Rainbow became known as a hangout for rock musicians and their groupies. Notable regulars at the Rainbow in this period include Keith Moon, Alice Cooper, Led Zeppelin, Ritchie Blackmore, Micky Dolenz, Harry Nilsson, John Lennon, Ringo Starr, and Neil Diamond. Elvis Presley and Johnny Cash were known to have occasionally visited the Rainbow. The group of musicians calling themselves The Hollywood Vampires made the Rainbow their home away from home in the mid-1970s. In the last two decades of his life, Motörhead frontman Lemmy was a daily fixture at the Rainbow whenever the band was not on tour, and often played a video poker machine at the end of the bar table.

Producer Kim Fowley used to hang out at the Rainbow, especially in 1975, when he formed the all-girl group The Runaways. Actress and musician Cheryl Smith was given her pseudonym Rainbeaux Smith early in her career as a result of her frequenting the Rainbow; she briefly replaced Sandy West as drummer of The Runaways at the end of that band's existence.

As musical trends on the Strip changed towards heavy metal in the 1980s, the Rainbow followed suit. Members of Mötley Crüe, Poison, and Guns N' Roses frequented the bar. It was mentioned in a number of songs, such as "Sunset and Babylon" by W.A.S.P., "Vampire" by L.A. Guns and "Peach Kelli Pop" by Redd Kross, and featured in the videos of "November Rain", "Estranged" and "Don't Cry" by Guns N' Roses and also, although briefly, "Rock Out" and "Stone Deaf in the U.S.A" by Motörhead.

Anthony Kiedis of the Red Hot Chili Peppers noted in his book Scar Tissue that he often sat with his father at the club along with members of bands such as Led Zeppelin and Kiss. Often the waitresses and bartenders, as well as those who frequented the establishment, were groupies. In Pamela Des Barres' book Let's Spend the Night Together, the author commented that as a barfly in the early 1980s she met a number of celebrities including Billy Idol.

On January 18, 2017, the Rainbow was inducted into the Hall of Heavy Metal History for introducing the world to new heavy metal acts.

On August 21, 2023, a lawsuit was filed by two women against the Rainbow Bar and Grill. The women alleged that employees knew that pornography actor Ron Jeremy sexually assaulted women including themselves, there, and allowed him to do so. On April 15, 2025, it was announced that a global settlement was reached with at least nine women who were suing the Rainbow Bar and Grill. Jeremy himself was found not competent to stand trial in his related criminal matter, but many of Jeremy's accusers were awarded financial compensation by the restaurant.

On November 5, 2023, Mikael Maglieri, who was the second-generation owner of the Whisky a Go Go nightclub and Rainbow Bar and Grill, died.

== In popular culture ==
- In Jimmy Buffett's song lyrics of "You'll Never Work In Dis Business Again" Buffett sings "I parked cars at the Rainbow".
- Hawthorne, California power-pop band Redd Kross mentions the Rainbow in the lyrics of their 1987 song "Peach Kelli Pop": "Laughing at all the assholes at the Rainbow, flying so high on coke - what a joke."
- The musical group Rainbow was named after this club.
- Fragrance company 19-69 released a perfume named after the Rainbow Bar in 2018.
- A documentary entitled The Rainbow directed by Zak Knutson, was released in 2019.
- Several scenes in the 2019 film The Dirt, depicting the career of metal band Mötley Crüe, take place in the Rainbow Bar.

== See also ==
- The Troubadour
- The Viper Room

== Bibliography ==
- Bloom, Jerry (2007). Black Knight. Music Sales Group. ISBN 9780857120533.
