= Hollywood Vampires (Hollywood Vampires album) =

Studio album by Hollywood Vampires
- Released: September 11, 2015
- Recorded: 2012–2014
- Studio: In Los Angeles
- Genre: Rock
- Length: 48:28
- Labels: Republic; UMe
- Producer: Bob Ezrin

Hollywood Vampires chronology
Hollywood Vampires (2015)	Rise (2019)

Hollywood Vampires is the self-titled debut studio album by American rock supergroup Hollywood Vampires, formed in 2015 by Alice Cooper, Johnny Depp and Joe Perry to honor the music of the rock stars who died from excess in the 1970s. Released on September 11, 2015, for Republic Records, the album features guest appearances by Paul McCartney, Robby Krieger, Orianthi, Dave Grohl, Christopher Lee, Slash, Brian Johnson, Joe Walsh, Perry Farrell, and Zak Starkey amongst others.

== Content ==
At his shows, Alice Cooper often performs cover songs as a tribute to his drinking buddies The Hollywood Vampires. For an album of covers based on the latter, Cooper wanted songs specific to their early 70s era. "Jim Morrison and Jimi Hendrix of course were before the Vampires," he conceded. "But they were, like, early, early-breed Vampires. They would have been there every single night."

The songs duly hail from acts who fit the original group's "lore", with the exception of two new tracks by Cooper and Depp titled "My Dead Drunk Friends" and "Raise the Dead". "My Dead Drunk Friends" is named after Cooper's recent favorite turn of phrase. Of that, Cooper says "'My dead drunk friends', they would have laughed at that. It was their sense of humor."

Of McCartney's appearance, Depp recalled: "We're recording live… Alice looks at me with this befuddled little look and he's mouthing the words, 'Oh my god, that's Paul McCartney!' to me… Then I look over at Joe Perry – one of my guitar heroes from when I was a kid – and he looks at me and he says, mouthing it, 'Jesus – look, man, it's Paul McCartney!' It was great to see those two huge stars being starstruck."

The lead track is a spoken word piece titled "The Last Vampire" voiced by Christopher Lee, in which he recites a passage from Bram Stoker's Dracula. This was Lee's final recording for a musical album before his death in June 2015.

A deluxe digital edition was released on February 12, 2016, and features "I'm a Boy", "Seven and Seven Is" and "As Bad as I Am".

== Critical reception ==
Professional ratings
Aggregate scores
Source	Rating
Metacritic	69/100
Review scores
Source	Rating
AllMusic	3/5 stars
Rolling Stone	3.5/4 stars

Upon release, the album received generally positive reviews from music critics. At Metacritic, which assigns a weighted average rating out of 100 to reviews from mainstream publications, this release received an average score of 69, based on 7 reviews, indicating "generally favorable reviews".

== Track listing ==
No.	Title	Writer(s)	Original Artist(s)	Length
1.	"The Last Vampire"	Johnny Depp; Bob Ezrin; Christopher Lee	Original recording	1:35
2.	"Raise the Dead"	Depp; Ezrin; Alice Cooper; Tommy Henriksen; Bruce Witkin; Rob Klonel	Original recording	3:31
3.	"My Generation"	Pete Townshend	The Who	2:47
4.	"Whole Lotta Love"	Jimmy Page; Robert Plant; John Bonham; John Paul Jones; Willie Dixon	Led Zeppelin	4:13
5.	"I Got a Line on You"	Randy California	Spirit	2:48
6.	"Five to One / Break On Through (To the Other Side)"	Jim Morrison; Robby Krieger; Ray Manzarek; John Densmore	The Doors	4:17
7.	"One / Jump into the Fire"	Harry Nilsson	Harry Nilsson	5:07
8.	"Come and Get It"	Paul McCartney	Badfinger	2:59
9.	"Jeepster"	Marc Bolan	T. Rex	2:43
10.	"Cold Turkey"	John Lennon	Plastic Ono Band	3:07
11.	"Manic Depression"	Jimi Hendrix	The Jimi Hendrix Experience	2:43
12.	"Itchycoo Park"	Steve Marriot; Ronnie Lane	Small Faces	2:55
13.	"School's Out / Another Brick in the Wall (Part 2)"	Cooper; Michael Bruce; Glen Buxton; Dennis Dunaway; Neal Smith / Roger Waters	Alice Cooper / Pink Floyd	5:14
14.	"My Dead Drunk Friends"	Depp; Cooper; Ezrin; Witkin; Henriksen	Original recording	4:30

Deluxe Edition bonus tracks
No.	Title	Writer(s)	Original Artist(s)	Length
15.	"I'm a Boy"	Townshend	The Who	2:38
16.	"Seven and Seven Is"	Arthur Lee	Love	3:05
17.	"As Bad as I Am"	Depp; Witkin; Henriksen; Matt Sorum	Original recording	3:45

== Personnel ==
Main musicians:

The band:

- Alice Cooper – lead and backing vocals, harmonica (track 4)
- Johnny Depp – lead and rhythm guitars (tracks 2–14), keyboards (track 1), backing vocals, slide guitar (track 4)
- Joe Perry – lead and rhythm guitars (tracks 8–10, 13), backing vocals

Studio musicians:

- Tommy Henriksen – keyboards (track 4, 9–10, 12, 14), guitar (tracks 2–7, 9–13), backing vocals
- Bruce Witkin – bass (tracks 2–3, 6–7, 9–12, 14), keyboards (tracks 7, 14), guitar (tracks 2, 4, 5, 7, 13–14), backing vocals
- Glen Sobel – drums (tracks 2, 9–10, 12, 14)

Guest vocalists:

- Sir Christopher Lee – vocals (track 1)
- Brian Johnson – vocals (tracks 4, 13)
- Perry Farrell – vocals, backing vocals (tracks 5, 7)
- Sir Paul McCartney – piano, bass and vocals (track 8)

Guest musicians:

- Justin Cortelyou – keyboard (track 1)
- Bob Ezrin – keyboards (tracks 1, 7, 11, 14), backing vocals
- Charlie Judge – keyboards (track 6)
- Orianthi – guitar (track 4)
- Joe Walsh – guitar (tracks 4–5, 11)
- Robby Krieger – guitar (tracks 6–7)
- Slash – guitar (track 13)
- Kip Winger – bass, backing vocals (tracks 4–5)
- Dennis Dunaway – bass (track 13)
- Zak Starkey – drums (tracks 3–4, 11)
- Abe Laboriel Jr. – drums, backing vocals (tracks 5–6, 8)
- Dave Grohl – drums (track 7)
- Neal Smith – drums (track 13)
- Matt Sorum – drums, backing vocals (track 17)

== Charts ==
Chart (2015–19)	Peak position
Australian Albums (ARIA)	34
Austrian Albums (Ö3 Austria)	48
Belgian Albums (Ultratop Flanders)	76
Belgian Albums (Ultratop Wallonia)	34
Dutch Albums (Album Top 100)	47
French Albums (SNEP)	54
Hungarian Albums (MAHASZ)	40
German Albums (Offizielle Top 100)	59
Scottish Albums (Official Charts)	25
Swiss Albums (Schweizer Hitparade)	24
UK Albums (Official Charts)	30
US Billboard 200	43
