= The Hollywood Vampires =

Celebrity drinking club formed by Alice Cooper

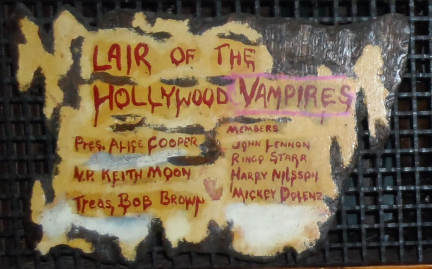
- Plaque from the Rainbow Bar and Grill showing the loft where the club resided along with member information.
- Formation: 1970s
- Founder: Alice Cooper
- Type: Drinking club
- Headquarters: Rainbow Bar and Grill
- Location: West Hollywood, California
- President: Alice Cooper
- Vice president: Keith Moon
- Treasurer: Bob Brown
- Key people: Alice Cooper; Keith Moon; Ringo Starr; John Lennon; Harry Nilsson; Micky Dolenz

The Hollywood Vampires was a celebrity drinking club formed by Alice Cooper in the 1970s. The hazing to get into the club was to outdrink all the members. According to Cooper in the documentary Prime Cuts: "The Speakeasy and Tramps were the place to be in London. There was a little loft at the Rainbow Bar and Grill in LA (W. Hollywood), they only had that for the club."

== Members ==
Cooper listed himself, Keith Moon, Ringo Starr, Micky Dolenz and Harry Nilsson as the club's principal members: "It was that crowd, every night those same people. Every once in a while John Lennon would come into town or Keith Emerson and they would be honorable members of the night. They still have a plaque there at the Rainbow, where it says 'The Lair of the Hollywood Vampires'."

Although Brian Wilson and Iggy Pop often fraternized with members of the club, it remains unclear if they were formally inducted.

Additional members

- Keith Allison
- John Belushi
- Marc Bolan
- Jack Cruz
- Keith Emerson
- Mal Evans
- John Lennon
- Bernie Taupin
- Klaus Voormann

== Supergroup ==
In 2012, Cooper formed a supergroup named after the club with Johnny Depp and Joe Perry. They released their debut studio album, Hollywood Vampires, on September 11.

== See also ==
- Son of Dracula
- The Rat Pack, a similar group originated by Humphrey Bogart that later included Frank Sinatra and Dean Martin.
- The Sons of Lee Marvin
