= List of dark cabaret artists =

This is a list of musical artists who pertain to the dark cabaret genre.

== A ==
- Abby Travis
- Alu
- Amanda Palmer
- American Murder Song
- Andi Sexgang
- Anohni and the Johnsons
- Aurelio Voltaire

== B ==
- Baby Dee
- Battle Circus
- Beat Circus
- Birdeatsbaby
- Bitter Ruin
- Black Tape For A Blue Girl

== C ==
- Caravan of Thieves
- Charming Hostess
- Circus Contraption
- Czesław Śpiewa

== D ==
- Dakh Daughters
- Diablo Swing Orchestra
- The Dresden Dolls (Amanda Palmer and Brian Viglione)

== E ==
- Emilie Autumn
- Evelyn Evelyn

== F ==
- Fantasmagoria
- Friendly Rich

== G ==
- Gaba Kulka
- Gin Wigmore
- Gitane Demone

== H ==
- Hannah Fury
- H.U.M.A.N.W.I.N.E.

== I ==
- IAMX
- Insomniac Folklore

== J ==
- The Jane Austen Argument
- Jason Webley
- Jill Tracy
- Johnny Hollow

== K ==
- Kaizers Orchestra
- Katzenjammer Kabarett
- Klaus Nomi
- The Kransky Sisters

== L ==
- Little Annie
- Lonely Drifter Karen
- Lola Blanc

== M ==
- Majandra Delfino
- Man Man
- Marc Almond (also Marc & The Mambas)
- Marcella and the Forget-Me-Nots
- Meow Meow
- Meret Becker
- Mishkin Fitzgerald
- Momus

== N ==
- Nina Hagen

== P ==
- Pretty Balanced
- Puerto Muerto

== R ==
- Rasputina
- The Romanovs
- Rosin Coven
- Rozz Williams

== S ==
- Sarah and the Safe Word
- Sex Gang Children
- Spiritual Front
- Stolen Babies
- Sxip Shirey

== T ==
- The Real Tuesday Weld
- The Tempers
- The Tiger Lillies
- Tom Waits

== V ==
- Vermillion Lies
- Veronique Chevalier

== W ==
- The World/Inferno Friendship Society
- Will Wood
