= In Tuned Out – Live '93 =

Live album by Shadow Project
- Released: February 22, 1994
- Recorded: 1993
- Genre: Deathrock
- Length: 65:04
- Label: Triple X
- Producer: Mark Linett

Shadow Project chronology
Dreams for the Dying (1992)	In Tuned Out – Live '93 (1994)	From the Heart (1998)

In Tuned Out – Live '93 is a live album by American deathrock band Shadow Project, released in early 1994 by Triple X Records.

== Production ==
During their 1993 tour in support for Dreams for the Dying's release, Shadow Project recorded a concert held in Fullerton, California on June 20, later to be released as In Tuned Out. Alongside tracks culled from their two studio albums, the record features an Alice Cooper medley, a David Bowie cover ("Panic in Detroit") and two unreleased songs. A Christian Death original, "Still Born/Still Life" – dedicated to serial killer Jeffrey Dahmer – was also included in the set.

== Split ==
Three months after this recording Shadow Project broke up. Eva O and Paris left the band to focus on the Eva O Halo Experience CD Demons Fall for an Angel's Kiss. For his part, Williams declared that Shadow Project went as far it could. "Eva wanted to go in one direction and I in another", he justified; he then went on to pursue his own musical interests.

== Track listing ==
No.	Title	Music	Length
1.	"Under Your Wing 3"	Eva O.	2:27
2.	"Holy Hell"	Eva O.	3:36
3.	"Lying Deep"	Eva O.	4:37
4.	"Here and There"	Eva O.	2:06
5.	"Panic in Detroit"	D. Bowie	3:30
6.	"Death Plays His Role"	Eva O.	2:28
7.	"Penny in a Bucket"	Eva O.	3:12
8.	"Static Jesus"	Eva O.	5:39
9.	"Days of Glory"	R. Williams, Eva O.	4:12
10.	"Still Born/Still Life"	R. Williams	2:20
11.	"Knight Stalker"	Eva O.	6:01
12.	"Dead Babies/Killer"	A. Cooper, G. Buxton, D. Dunaway, N. Smith	8:29
13.	"Guilty Stroke"	R. Williams, Paris	5:32
14.	"Epitaph (Time Will Tell)"	R. Williams, J. Emery	3:50
15.	"When the Heart Breaks"	R. Williams	2:23
16.	"Lore"	Eva O., Paris	4:42

== Credits ==
Shadow Project

- Rozz Williams – vocals
- Eva O – guitar, vocals
- Paris – keyboards and samples
- Mark Barone – bass
- Christian Omar Madrigal Izzo – drums

Production

- Mark Linett – producer, mixer
- N. Keller House – design, front cover art
