= Bigger Teeth =

EP by Birdeatsbaby
- Released: 10 October 2010
- Genre: Progressive rock, dark cabaret
- Length: 17:23
- Label: Dead Round Eyes
- Producer: Marc R Norris, Nathan Lornie

Birdeatsbaby chronology
Here She Comes-a-Tumblin' (2009)	Bigger Teeth (2010)	Feast of Hammers (2012)

Bigger Teeth is a 2010 EP by English progressive rock band Birdeatsbaby, released through their own label, Dead Round Eyes.

The track "Enemies Like Me" was later re-recorded and released on the band's 2014 album The Bullet Within.

== Promotion and release ==
On 10 October 2010, the band played a release party for the EP at The Good Ship, Kilburn in London.

After the release of the album, in February 2011, a video for "Rosary", directed and produced by Dominic William Stoate, Kelly Marriot and Tom Marcham, was published to the official Birdeatsbaby Youtube channel.

== Reception ==
The EP received positive reviews. Owain Paciuszko of God Is in the TV gave the EP 4/5, saying, "this Brighton quartet keep their tunes consistently inventive, their compositions punctuated with a certain arch theatricality that's perfectly befitting their kind of anti-folk, classical-punk vibe". Sarah Elliott of Pop Culture Monster called it "vengeful, hyperactive, haunting, joyous, and soulful" and that it "has just the right amount of humour", also saying "this bite size offering will both satiate and leave you hungry for more". A review from Brighton Source praised the production style, calling it "eerily effective as it deliciously taints the initially apparent sweetness of the songs."

== Track listing ==
No.	Title	Length
1.	"The Devil So Charming"	3:09
2.	"The Replacement"	3:03
3.	"Enemies Like Me"	5:20
4.	"Gone!"	2:08
5.	"Rosary"	3:41
Total length:		17:23

== Personnel ==
- Mishkin Fitzgerald - Vocals, piano
- Garry Mitchell - Guitar and bass
- Keely McDonald - Violin, backing vocals, writing
- Ella Stimey - Cello, vocals
- Philippa Bloomfield - Drums
