= Premature Ejaculation (band) =

- Left to right: Ron Athey, Rozz Williams

Background information
- Origin: Los Angeles, United States
- Genres: Industrial, dark ambient, performance art
- Years active: 1981, 1986–1998 2023 - present.
- Labels: Happiest Tapes on Earth, Dark Vinyl, Baader Meinhoff, Gymnastic, Triple XXX, Cleopatra, Malaise Music

Premature Ejaculation is an industrial, experimental, and performance art band from Pomona, California formed in 1981 by Rozz Williams and Ron Athey. They dissolved in less than one year. Premature Ejaculation was reformed in 1986 by Williams with new members. The group disbanded completely after Rozz Williams' death in 1998. Active again since 2023 with Chuck Collison once again at the helm.

== History ==
=== Formation ===
Premature Ejaculation was one of Rozz Williams' many musical projects. Unlike his deathrock band Christian Death, Premature Ejaculation did not use standard "rock band" instruments. Instead, their sound was created using various objects, instruments and lo-fi devices. Early Premature Ejaculation recordings are rare. Much of their original work was only shared among friends.

Premature Ejaculation played few live performances, mostly because clubs refused to book them due to their controversial stage theatrics. One of their older acts included Athey eating a dead cat (the animal was roadkill), documented in the book Hardcore California.

=== Rebirth ===
When the band reformed in 1986, Williams was joined by Chuck Collison. Also joining them were Lee Wildes and Kris Fuller (both deceased). The group's theme remained avant-garde throughout and focused on the bizarre and taboo. They used unexpected sounds and noises to create intense soundscapes. Their refined and overwhelmingly dark use of dark multimedia often left their fans astonished, and sometimes sickened.

Chuck Collison played a major role in the reformed group, especially with regard to their higher quality sound. Collison started his own label 'The Happiest Place on Earth' to release Premature Ejaculation's recordings. The name was soon changed to 'The Happiest Tapes on Earth' in order to avoid potential legal problems with Disney.

The first two full-length recordings were released via Chuck Collison's label. Releases were only available in the cassette format until later releases on vinyl and compact disc. Death Cultures was the first to be released followed by Blood Told in Spine and Assertive Discipline. The reformed group released multiple recordings on other labels, with Anesthesia on Dark Vinyl Records from Germany being among their most popular. The group also released recordings on Cleopatra Records, Triple XXX, and numerous other labels.

Premature Ejaculation was not Rozz Williams' most well-known project. Christian Death remains his most famous group (also see Shadow Project with Eva O). Although not his most famous work, Williams often cited Premature Ejaculation as his favorite musical venture. The group left behind a prolific back catalog including Wound of Exit, released posthumously.

2nd Rebirth.

As of 2023 the project is active again with Chuck Collison having played several live shows in the US as Premature Ejaculation.

== Members ==
- Rozz Williams (1981–1998)
- Ron Athey (1981–1982)
- Chuck Collison (1986–present)
- Lee Wildes (1986–1987)
- Kris Fuller (1986–1989)
- Paris Sadonis
- Ryan Wildstar
- Erik Christides

== Discography ==
- PE – Pt.1 (1981)
- PE – Pt.2 (1981)
- A Little Hard to Swallow
- Living Monstrocities / Descent
- Body of a Crow (1986)
- Death Cultures (1987)
- Assertive Discipline (1988)
- Death Cultures III (1988)
- Night Sweats (1988)
- Blood Told in Spine (1991)
- Blue Honey / Pigface Show & Tell (1988)
- Anesthesia (1992)
- Necessary Discomforts (1993)
- Estimating the Time of Death (1994)
- Dead Horse Riddles (1994)
- Wound of Exit (1998)
- 6 (2001)

Video releases

- Death Cultures III (1988)
- Not the Real Criminal (1989)
- The End is Here (1989)

== References and links. ==
2. Article on the history of Premature Ejaculation by Lazrs3: https://www.lazaruscorporation.co.uk/articles/sound-of-premature-ejaculation

3. Comprehensive 2023 YouTube interview with Chuck Collison by Rozz Williams Scholars Society: https://www.youtube.com/live/bHynSb3DiOk?si=nADTy78cAlRNIGEe
