= Birdeatsbaby =

English progressive rock band

- Origin: Brighton, United Kingdom
- Genres: Dark cabaret; Progressive rock; alternative rock; Heavy metal; Klezmer
- Years active: 2008 – 2024
- Labels: Dead Round Eyes Records; Leesta Vall; Dr. Music Records
- Spinoffs: Crimson Veil
- Members: Mishkin Fitzgerald; Garry Mitchell; Hana Maria; Anna Mylee
- Past members: Ella Stirney; Philippa Bloomfield; Keely McDonald; Charlie Reith-Pert; Katha Rothe; Tessa Gilles; Forbes Coleman; Pablo Paracchino
- Website: www.birdeatsbaby.co.uk

Birdeatsbaby was an English progressive rock band from Brighton, United Kingdom, formed in 2008. At their start, the band's music was considered to be within the dark cabaret genre, but later began to incorporate aspects of heavy metal, klezmer and other musical styles. Their music is noted for its orchestral elements, complex rhythms and exotic instrumentation, with lyrics referencing themes such as religion, alienation, sexual orientation, obsession and animal rights. According to group members, their influences include Chopin, Mozart, Debussy, Queen, Muse and Nick Cave. Since the release of their 2016 album Tanta Furia, their influences have also come from progressive metal artists such as Tool and Opeth.

Birdeatsbaby has toured throughout the UK, North America and Europe. As of 2020, they have released five studio albums and 20 EPs and singles. The band has previously released music through their own label, Dead Round Eyes Records, and since 2018 have been under the label Dr Music Records. In 2024, the members of Birdeatsbaby formed an alternative metal band called Crimson Veil, and stopped releasing music as Birdeatsbaby.

== History ==
=== 2008–2010: Formation and Here She Comes-a-Tumblin' ===
Mishkin Fitzgerald has said that the name “Birdeatsbaby” came from a "lucid nightmare" she had during a particularly long bout of insomnia in her teens. Fitzgerald, a classically trained pianist, met and became friends with Garry Mitchell while at University in Brighton. The two formed a creative partnership and would go on to form Birdeatsbaby, along with Keely McDonald, Ella Stirney and Philippa Bloomfield. Fitzgerald has stated that the band's first gig took place in 2006. Their first EP, China Doll, was released on January 1, 2008.

Beginning on April 9, 2008, the band performed at the Surface Unsigned Festival, where they eventually reached the semi-finals.

In promotion of their then upcoming debut album Here She Comes-a-Tumblin', the band published their first music video, for their song "The Trouble", to their official Youtube channel on April 1, 2009. The full album was released on June 1 of that year. In June and July of that year, the band went on their first tour. Performing with Brighton-based drag queen Mister Joe Black, tour stops included the United Kingdom, France, Germany, the Czech Republic, Slovakia and Austria.

In July 2010, Ella Stirney left Birdeatsbaby to focus on a career as a music teacher. Instead of recruiting another cellist, the band decided to remain a quartet. Their next EP, Bigger Teeth, was released in October of that year, followed by a short tour with fellow Brighton-based duo Bitter Ruin, again in the UK and parts of Europe. The track "Enemies Like Me" from Bigger Teeth was featured on Tom Robinson's BBC Introducing Mixtape in November 2010.

=== 2011–2012: Feast Of Hammers ===
In January 2011, drummer Philippa Bloomfield left the band to pursue a full-time career in film, and was replaced by Charlie Reith-Pert. In February, the band embarked on their first American tour, again performing with Mister Joe Black, as well as with the New York-based band This Way To The Egress. While in the United States, the band worked with producer Jason Rubal at his studio, Seventh Wave, in Pennsylvania to record a new album, entitled Feast of Hammers. In July 2011, the band played at the Secret Garden Party.

On January 16, 2012, the band was featured on the BBC Radio 6 Music program BBC Introducing with Tom Robinson. In October 2011 and February 2012, the band released music videos for two singles from the upcoming album on their Youtube channel; the title track "Feast of Hammers" and "Incitatus", respectively. The full album was released on February 20, 2012. Simon Price reviewed the album for The Independent, and also gave it honorable mention in his review of "The best music of 2012".

The band experienced another change in personnel as it was announced in April 2012 that Reith-Pert had left the band for a trip around the world, his collegiate studies being completed. On May 8 it was announced that percussionist Katha Rothe would be joining the band for the Feast of Hammers tour, with dates in the UK, Europe, and the USA. On May 20, the band again released a music video for the third single from the album, "Anchor", with a video for "The Sailor's Wife" following on July 16.

=== 2013–2014: The Bullet Within ===
On June 5, 2013, it was announced violinist Keely McDonald was leaving Birdeatsbaby, to be replaced by Tessa Gilles. A new single and accompanying music video, "Ghosts", from the band's then forthcoming new album, were released in October 2013. The band resumed touring, opening for ASP in Germany. They then flew to Rome to open for the Italian rock band Belladonna, and later that year supported Coppelius on tour in Germany. In November, the band began a Kickstarter crowdfunding effort to support their new album The Bullet Within.

2014 saw Birdeatsbaby once again in the studio, recording The Bullet Within. Forbes Coleman, who had previously worked on Fitzgerald's 2013 solo album Present Company, had now joined the band full-time as percussionist, technical resource and producer, and Hana Maria had replaced Tessa Gilles on violin and backing vocals. The Kickstarter campaign all-or-nothing amount was set at £10,000; the final total brought in was just over £11,000. It was widely supported by their devoted fan base (known as "The Flock"). Melora Creager from Rasputina recorded cello on the track "Into The Black". Gabby Young (formerly of Other Animals) sang on the track "Spiders", and also appeared in the music video for the song, which was directed by former Birdeatsbaby drummer Philippa Bloomfield. The album was released on Jul 14, 2014. Steven Gullotta of BrutalResonance.com called it "dark, gorgeous, and mature," and, "their best album to date." Much of 2014 was spent on tour in support of the Bullet record; in April the band toured in Denmark with Geoff Berner. In October, the track "Tenterhooks" was included on R2 Magazine's compilation CD, Un-Herd Volume 47.

=== 2015–2016: Patreon and Tanta Furia ===
In lieu of another Kickstarter project, Birdeatsbaby joined the crowdfunding platform Patreon in July 2015 in order to provide more stable funding for the band's work. In October, to promote their Patreon and upcoming tours, the band released an hour long documentary video, titled "Birdeatsbaby - The Documentary", originally published only for their Patrons, and later made widely available on Youtube, featuring in-depth interviews with each member of the band. The band continued to produce Patreon-exclusive content, including a livestream performance of their entire catalogue from the studio. They also continued to write for their next album while on tour, making stops in the UK, Europe, the Eastern United States, and Mexico City.

The new album, Tanta Furia, was released on November 7, 2016. The title, Spanish for "so much fury", was intended as a nod to Birdeatsbaby's devoted Mexican fanbase. The record was also the first from the band to have a vinyl release. Tanta Furia was seen as a step away from the group's cabaret-style roots, toward a heavier, more punk and metal inspired tone, but still featuring much of the orchestration and classical elements on display in their previous records. The band also began to expand their instrumentation, with Fitzgerald playing accordion on the title track, as well as contributions from Brighton-based Gospel choir group The Dulcetones. The Dulcetones also appeared in the band's official music video for the track "Mary". The final track on the record, "Eulogy", Jez Rowden of The Progressive Aspect wrote, was the "magical conclusion of a stunningly good album". Tanta Furia came in at number 67 on NPR's All Songs Considered Listener Poll of the top 100 albums of 2016. In December 2016, Fitzgerald was interviewed by Psychology Today, where she spoke about how her struggle with depression informed her writing of the album and her use of music as a coping mechanism.

=== 2018–2019: Claws and The World Conspires ===
In September 2018, the band put out a their single "Better Man", along with an accompanying music video which Fitzgerald described as "Peaky Blinders themed". In an interview, Fitzgerald said of the song, "it's a feminist anthem about having to take on both genders if you’re a woman in this world and you’re in an environment where you have to survive."

In December 2018, Birdeatsbaby released Claws (A Collection of Covers), a compilation of songs recorded from 2015 to 2018, which, as the title suggests, contains covers from a number of diverse artists, including David Bowie, Lead Belly and My Chemical Romance, among others. The album was released as a free download as a Christmas gift to their fans.

Shortly after Coleman's departure from Birdeatsbaby to concentrate on his production career at AudioBeach Studios, the band brought in drummer Pablo Paracchino to begin work on their next album. Having met Fitzgerald and Maria in Los Angeles through a mutual friend, John Fryer joined the project as producer.

The World Conspires, the band's fifth studio album, and the longest yet, with 15 tracks totaling 67 minutes, was released on October 18, 2019, under the label Dr. Music Records. The record saw the band again expand their repertoire of instruments, including the addition of harp, hurdy-gurdy, flute, saxophone, clarinet and phonofiddle, while relying less on the piano. The album featured more hallmarks of progressive metal - chordal dissonance, complex time signatures, unorthodox harmonies - than any of the band's previous works. Also in evidence were more synthesized keyboards, atonal screaming and related elements of progressive rock. The title track, a duo with Fitzgerald, also saw Mitchell's first foray into vocal performance. Prog magazine included the album track "Lady Grey" on the CD of 10 best new progressive tracks in their November 2019 issue.

== Band members ==
Current members

- Mishkin Fitzgerald (Piano, Accordion, Vocals)
- Garry Mitchell (Guitar, Bass, Vocals)
- Hana Maria (Violin, Harp, Vocals)
- Anna Mylee (Drums)

Former members

- Ella Stirney - Cello, vocals (2008 - 2010)
- Philippa Bloomfield - Drums (2008 - 2011)
- Charlie Reith-Pert - Drums (2011 - 2012)
- Keely McDonald - Violin, vocals (2008 - 2012)
- Katha Rothe - Drums (2012 - 2013)
- Tessa Gilles - Violin, backing vocals (2012 - 2013)
- Forbes Coleman - Drums (2013 - 2018)
- Pablo Paracchino - Drums (2018 - 2019)

== Discography ==
Studio Albums

- Here She Comes-a-Tumblin' (2009)
- Feast of Hammers (2012)
- The Bullet Within (2014)
- Tanta Furia (2016)
- The World Conspires (2019)

Live Albums

- Live in Prague (2016)
- Live in Hannover (2016)

EPs and Singles

- China Doll EP (2009)
- What You Are (2009)
- Bigger Teeth EP (2010)
- Through Ten Walls (2011)
- Feast of Hammers (2011)
- Incitatus (2011)
- Anchor (2012)
- The Bullet (2014)
- Tenterhooks (2014)
- Silence/My Arms Will Open Wide (2014)
- White Hearts (2015)
- Temple (2016)
- No Mirror/Baby Steps (2016)
- Sober (Tool cover) (2017)
- Better Man EP (2018)
- Twelve Steps EP (2018)
- Fortitude EP (2018)
- Painkiller (2019)
- Box of Razorblades (2019)

Compilation albums

- Claws (A Collection of Covers) (2018)
