= Shadow Project (album) =

Studio album by Shadow Project
- Released: 1991
- Genre: Deathrock
- Length: 44:48
- Label: Triple X
- Producer: Shadow Project; Greg Brown; Craig Nepp

Shadow Project chronology
Shadow Project (1991)	Dreams for the Dying (1992)

Professional ratings
Review scores
Source	Rating
AllMusic	4/5 stars

Shadow Project is the debut album of American deathrock band Shadow Project, released in 1991 by Triple X Records.

== Reception ==
AllMusic described Shadow Project's debut as a unique and adventurous "blend of goth, punk and glam", a challenging record that would ultimately prove satisfying after several spins.

== Track listing ==
No.	Title	Length
1.	"Under Your Wing"	2:29
2.	"The Other Flesh"	1:57
3.	"Death Plays His Role"	2:38
4.	"Penny in a Bucket"	2:55
5.	"Epitaph (Time Will)"	3:52
6.	"Red Handed"	4:07
7.	"Here and There"	2:17
8.	"Working On Beyond"	3:23
9.	"Holy Hell"	3:48
10.	"Lying Deep"	6:01
11.	"Into the Light"	7:51
12.	"Holy Holy"	3:34

== Credits ==
Shadow Project

- Rozz Williams – vocals
- Eva O – guitar
- Jill Emery – bass
- Thomas Morgan – drums
- Paris – keyboards

Production

- Shadow Project – production, design
- Greg Brown – producer, engineer
- Craig Nepp – producer, engineer
- Arte DeLeon – photography
- Dino Paredes – design
