= From the Heart =

From the Heart may refer to:

== Music ==
=== Albums ===
- From the Heart (Etta Jones album), a 1962 album by Etta Jones
- From the Heart (Hank Crawford album), a 1962 album by Hank Crawford
- From the Heart (Tom Jones album), third studio album, 1966
- From the Heart (Diana Trask album), a 1969 album by Diana Trask
- From the Heart (Janie Fricke album), a 1979 album by Janie FRicke
- From the Heart, Shadow Project's third and final album, 1998
- From the Heart (Another Level album) compilation
- From the Heart (Doug Stone album)
- From the Heart (Katherine Jenkins album)
- From the Heart (Ankie Bagger album)
- From the Heart, album by Smokie
- From the Heart: Greatest Hits, a Bonnie Tyler compilation album

=== Songs ===
- From the Heart (song), a song by Another Level from Nexus
- "From the Heart", a song by Hoobastank from the 2003 album The Reason
- "From the Heart" a song by Polo G from the 2024 album Hood Poet

== Campaigns ==
- From the Heart, a campaign for the "Yes" vote in the 2023 Australian Indigenous Voice referendum
- From the Heart (TV campaign), a 2013–4 ITV campaign initiative to raise awareness for organ donation in the UK

== Other uses ==
- Mula sa Puso (From the Heart), a 1997 Filipino TV series
- Dil Se.. (From the Heart), a 1998 Indian Hindi film
- From the Heart (novel), a 2017 novel by Susan Hill

== See also ==
- One from the Heart, a musical film directed by Francis Ford Coppola
