= Dreams for the Dying =

Studio album by Shadow Project
- Released: November 10, 1992
- Recorded: 1992 at Track Record (North Hollywood)
- Genre: Deathrock, gothic rock
- Length: 57:15
- Label: Triple X
- Producer: Rozz Williams; Eva O

Shadow Project chronology
Shadow Project (1991)	Dreams for the Dying (1992)	In Tuned Out - Live '93 (1994)

Dreams for the Dying is the second album by American deathrock band Shadow Project, released in late 1992 by Triple X Records.

== Production ==
The album was recorded during the 1992 Los Angeles riots. Because of the curfew the band was in lockdown at the studio. This tension reflected on to the album, coupled by the fact that Eva O. and Rozz Williams "were at the height of our hatred of everything: the world, ourselves, each other, the world, everything that was going on". Former Triple X A&R Director Bruce Duff thought this was "one of the most genuinely evil records ever recorded".

== Themes ==
Rozz Williams continued to deal with some his favorite subjects in this record, such as death ("Funeral Rites"), religion ("Static Jesus," "Thy Kingdom Come") and violence ("Knight Stalker"). "Knight Stalker" was dedicated to serial killer Richard "Night Stalker" Ramirez.

== Track listing ==
No.	Title	Lyrics	Music	Length
1.	"Static Jesus"	Eva O	Eva O	5:36
2.	"Days of Glory"	Rozz Williams, Eva O	R. Williams	4:17
3.	"Funeral Rites (with Equestrian Sympathies)"	R. Williams	R. Williams, Paris Sadonis	7:16
4.	"Zaned People"	Eva O, R. Williams	Eva O	7:28
5.	"Thy Kingdom Come"	R. Williams	R. Williams	7:54
6.	"Knight Stalker"	Eva O	Eva O	7:19
7.	"Holding You Close"	Eva O	Eva O	7:30
8.	"Lord of the Flies"	R. Williams	R. Williams	6:18
9.	"The Circle and the Cross"	R. Williams	R. Williams	3:02

== Credits ==
Shadow Project

- Rozz Williams – voices, guitars and piano
- Eva O – voices and guitars
- Jill Emery – bass
- Paris – keyboards and samples
- Peter Tomlinson – drums and samples

Guest musician

- Ace Farren Ford – saxophones and musette

Production

- Rozz Williams – producer, cover concept and design
- Eva O – producer, cover concept and design
- Brian Virtue – engineer
- Darian Sahanaja – assistant engineer
- Greg Geitzenuer – assistant engineer
- Dino Paredes – cover and package design
- Dean Karr – photography
