= Modern warfare (disambiguation) =

Modern warfare generally refers to contemporary warfare as contrasted with previous methods.

Aspects of modern warfare:

- Early modern warfare
- 18th-century warfare
- Napoleonic Wars
- Industrial warfare
- Mechanized warfare
- Total war
- Fourth-generation warfare

== Modern Warfare ==
- Modern warfare, book of Roger Trinquier written in 1961
- Modern Warfare (band), punk rock band from Long Beach, California
- "Modern Warfare" (Community), episode of the television series Community
- The Modern Warfare series of Call of Duty, a video game franchise
  - Call of Duty 4: Modern Warfare, released in 2007
    - Call of Duty 4: Modern Warfare (Nintendo DS), companion of the above game for Nintendo DS
  - Call of Duty: Modern Warfare 2, 2009 sequel to Call of Duty 4
  - Call of Duty: Modern Warfare – Mobilized, a companion of the above game for Nintendo DS
  - Call of Duty: Modern Warfare 3, 2011 sequel to Modern Warfare 2 and final installment in the original trilogy.
  - Call of Duty: Modern Warfare, first installment of the reboot series, released in 2019
  - Call of Duty: Modern Warfare II, sequel to Modern Warfare of 2019, released in 2022
  - Call of Duty: Modern Warfare III, released in 2023
  - Call of Duty: Modern Warfare 4, fourth and final installment of the rebooted series, released in 2026

== See also ==
- Military history
