= Dream Home Heartache =

Studio album by Rozz Williams and Gitane Demone
- Released: 1995
- Recorded: Between March 28 and April 5, 1995, Netherlands
- Genre: Experimental; dark cabaret
- Label: Triple X

Rozz Williams and Gitane Demone chronology
Every King a Bastard Son (1992)	Dream Home Heartache (1995)	The Whorse's Mouth (1997)

Professional ratings
Review scores
Source	Rating
AllMusic	4.5/5 stars

Dream Home Heartache is an experimental dark cabaret collaboration album featuring American musicians Rozz Williams and Gitane Demone, both former members of Christian Death. It was released in late 1995 by Triple X Records after being recorded between March 28 and April 5, 1995 in the Netherlands. Williams and Demone toured Europe and North America in support of the album, provoking a riot in Mexico City when fans were unable to enter the sold-out venue. The album is named after the Roxy Music song "In Every Dream Home a Heartache", a cover of which is the first and last track. The album features synthesisers, pianos and accordions, with cabaret-influenced (at times nearly a cappella) vocals.

The album has been described in print as "a stunning collection of bluesy cabaret songs", "on the pretty side of goth", and as "quite possibly Williams' most appealing work outside of Christian Death." Greg Fasolino, Katherine Yeske and Scott Ferguson, of alternative music magazine Trouser Press, describe the album as "a surreal experience that could be the score to some warped, shadowy Broadway musical".

== Track listing ==
Track	Song	Writer	Length	Notes
1	"In Every Dream Home a Heartache"	Ferry	7:33	Cover of Roxy Music's song of the same name
2	"These Vulnerable Eyes"	Demone, Rekvelt	3:46	
3	"The Pope's Egg Hat"	Rekfelt, Williams	5:11	
4	"Manic Depression"	Hendrix	6:03	Cover of Jimi Hendrix's song of the same name
5	"Flowers"	Williams	6:07	Featured on Projekt Records' A Dark Cabaret
6	"A World Apart"	Gaumer, Rekvelt, Williams	3:48	
7	"Moon Without a Tear"	Demone	2:32	
8	"In Every Dream Home a Heartache (Reprise)"	Ferry	2:31	Cover of Roxy Music's song of the same name
