= The Whorse's Mouth =

Studio album by Rozz Williams
- Released: June 3, 1996
- Genre: Spoken word Experimental music
- Length: 60:37
- Label: Hollows Hill, Triple X
- Producer: Gary Dobbins, Rozz Williams

Rozz Williams chronology
| Every King a Bastard Son (1992) | The Whorse's Mouth (1996) | Live in Berlin (2000) |

The Whorse's Mouth is an experimental spoken word studio album by American musician Rozz Williams. It was released on June 3, 1996, by Hollows Hill, and was Williams' last studio album before his suicide in 1998. The Whorse's Mouth deals with Williams' heroin addiction, and features artwork consisting of collages compiled by Williams and Erik Christides. The album was re-released by Triple X Records in 2000.

== Track listing ==
| No. | Title | Writer(s) | Length |
|---|---|---|---|
| 1. | "Temptation" | Christides, Freeman, Gaumer, Paris, Williams | 5:35 |
| 2. | "Life Is But a Dream" | Freeman, Gaumer, Paris, Williams | 5:01 |
| 3. | "Raped" | Gaumer, Paris, Williams | 4:38 |
| 4. | "Who's in Charge Here? (Beneath the Triumph of Shadows)" | Gaumer, Paris, Williams | 3:56 |
| 5. | "A Fire of Uncommon Velocity" | Gaumer, Paris, Williams | 5:47 |
| 6. | "Her Only Sin" | Paris, Williams | 4:58 |
| 7. | "Interlude" | Paris, Williams | 2:02 |
| 8. | "A Brother of Low Degree" | Gaumer, Williams | 6:06 |
| 9. | "Dear Skin" | Gaumer, Paris, Williams | 4:58 |
| 10. | "Maggot Drain" | Gaumer, Paris, Williams | 3:56 |
| 11. | "Dec. 30, 1334" | Paris, Williams | 8:58 |
| 12. | "Best of the Breed" | Gaumer, Paris, Williams | 4:29 |

== Personnel ==
The album production team consisted of

- Gary Dobbins – producer
- Jeff Zimmitti – design
- Paris Sadonis – clarinet, keyboards, producer
- Rozz Williams – bass guitar, vocals, lyrics, production, lead vocals, design, album artwork
- Ryan Gaumer – lyrics, backing vocals
- Christian Omar Madrigal Izzo – drums on "Best of the Breed" and "Who's in Charge Here"
- Anne Marie – violin on "A Fire of Uncommon Velocity"
- Erik Christides – album artwork
