= Feast of Hammers =

Studio album by Birdeatsbaby
- Released: 20 February 2012
- Studio: Seventh Wave, Pennsylvania, USA
- Genre: Progressive rock; dark cabaret
- Length: 41:36
- Label: Dead Round Eyes
- Producer: Jason Rubal

Birdeatsbaby chronology
Bigger Teeth (2010)	Feast of Hammers (2012)	The Bullet Within (2014)

Feast of Hammers is the second studio album by English progressive rock band Birdeatsbaby, first released on 20 February 2012, through the band's own label, Dead Round Eyes.

== Background, promotion and release ==
In February 2011, while on their first American tour, the band worked music producer Jason Rubal, recording the album at his studio, Seventh Wave, in Pennsylvania. The album was recorded over three weeks.

Prior to the release of the album, the band released three music videos, all directed by Dominic Stoate and Tom Marcham, and published on the official Birdeatsbaby Youtube channel. In April 2011, a music video for the song "Through Ten Walls", additionally directed by Kelly Marriot, and featuring the band playing in a dimly lit, cramped and crumbling basement, was released.

On 14 October of that year, the band released a music video for the song "Feast of Hammers." Inspired by the horror films The Hills Have Eyes and The Wickerman, the video portrays Mishkin Fitzgerald and the rest of the band being taken captive in the woods by a group of strange, masked people. One by one, the band has plastic bags put over their heads, their heads smashed with hammers, and their brains eaten. Both a "censored version" and a more graphic "explicit version" of the video were released, as well as an "alternate ending" where Fitzgerald, having escaped, runs out of the forest.

On 3 February 2012, a third music video was released, this time for the song "Incitatus". This video features Fitzgerald as a patient in an asylum with Keely McDonald as an evil nurse, and took stylistic inspirations from the film Gothika. The track was also released as a single, with a remix by Avon Bosco as a B-side, on February 6.

On 16 January 2012, the band was featured on the BBC Radio 6 Music program BBC Introducing with Tom Robinson.

In April 2012, it was announced that drummer Charlie Reith-Pert was leaving the band, and on May 8 the band announced that percussionist Katha Rothe would be joining them for the Feast of Hammers tour, with dates in the UK, Europe, and the USA.

After the album's release, a further two music videos for songs from the album, "Anchor" and "The Sailor's Wife", were released 20 May and 16 July 2012 respectively. The latter was directed by former Birdeatsbaby drummer Philippa Bloomfield. "Anchor" was released as a single with the song "Hanging Tree" as a B-side on 23 May 2012.

== Lyrics and themes ==
Many of the songs reference water, the sea, or nautical themes, as is reflected in the album's packaging.

Fitzgerald stated in an interview that the song "Through Ten Walls" was written about her experience being sexually assaulted as a teenager. She said, "The guy then moved in down my street, just a stone’s throw away from my house, that’s when I wrote, “Through Ten Walls”. Many of my songs are based around experience, I couldn’t help but use it at [sic] a subject matter as that kind of trauma can consume you and if you don’t get it out, then it can destroy you.""

== Reception ==
The album received generally positive reviews. Simon Price of The Independent said the album "carries heavy reverberations of the Dresden Dolls," but also that it "has an operatic quality which elevates it above mere pastiche", and also gave the album an honorable mention in his review of "The best music of 2012". Ben Graham of the Quietus described Fitzgerald's vocals as "softly seductive yet fiercely demanding you keep your distance, shifting suddenly from a whispery falsetto to a deep menacing growl". A review in Jason's Jukebox heralded the band as "the real deal", and praised Rubal's production, calling it "a clean production style, allowing each instrument to be heard clearly – which is a very effective style for this music." Joachim Brookes of the German publication Rock Times called the album "captivating" and noted its "drama" and "apocalyptic mood", praising Fitzgerald as a "brilliant composer and pianist" as well as her "colleagues who are able to act on an equal footing."

== Track listing ==
No.	Title	Length
1.	"Intro"	0:27
2.	"Love Will Bring You Nothing"	3:13
3.	"Anchor"	4:09
4.	"What The Water Gave Me"	2:56
5.	"Feast of Hammers"	4:13
6.	"The Sailor's Wife"	3:06
7.	"Incitatus"	4:49
8.	"Interlude"	0:51
9.	"Double Nine"	4:27
10.	"Through Ten Walls"	3:13
11.	"Tastes Like Sympathy"	3:50
12.	"Victoria"	3:55
13.	"Finale"	2:20
Total length:		41:36

== Personnel ==
Birdeatsbaby

- Mishkin Fitzgerald - Vocals, piano
- Garry Mitchell - Guitar and bass
- Keely McDonald - Violin, backing vocals
- Charlie Reith-Pert - Drums

Technical

- Jason Rubal - Recording, mixing and mastering
