= Mishkin Fitzgerald =

- Born: 10 February 1985 (age 41)
- Genres: Dark cabaret, progressive rock, alternative rock
- Occupation: Musician
- Instruments: Piano, vocals, accordion
- Years active: 2008–present
- Labels: Dead Round Eyes Records, Leesta Vall, Dr. Music Records

Mishkin Fitzgerald (born 10 February 1985) is an English musician from Brighton, England, most widely known as the lead vocalist and pianist of the progressive rock bands Birdeatsbaby and Crimson Veil.

== Early life and career ==
Born on 10 February 1985 to a church minister and a math teacher, Fitzgerald has described her upbringing as "religious and conservative". She learned music at an early age by singing hymns at church and playing piano for the congregation, as well as learning the flute at school. Initially teaching herself to play the piano by ear, Fitzgerald was subsequently classically trained by three different teachers, including Robert Orledge. Fitzgerald soon discovered rock and metal, and decided to she wanted to pursue music as a career.

While studying music at University in Brighton, Fitzgerald met and became friends with Garry Mitchell, and the two went on to found the group Birdeatsbaby. The original line up consisted of Fitzgerald on piano and vocals, Mitchell on guitar and bass, Keely McDonald on violin, Ella Stimey on cello, and Philippa Bloomfield on drums. They went on to release their first album Here She Comes-a-Tumblin' in 2009. Fitzgerald and Mitchell have gone on to release five studio albums as well as 20 EPs and singles with the band, with various lineups of other band members, and have toured throughout the UK, Europe, and North America.

In November 2012, a music video for the title track of Fitzgerald's then upcoming debut solo album, Present Company, was published to the official Birdeatsbaby Youtube channel. The video, directed by Dominic William Stoate and Matthew Kinealy, features Fitzgerald as a boxer who gets knocked out in the ring. The full album was released in May 2013. Her second solo album, Seraphim, was released in May 2017. In 2020, Fitzgerald released two instrumental albums: The Piano Conspires, a reworking of the 2019 Birdeatsbaby album The World Conspires arranged for solo piano, in August, and Alkonost in December.

Fitzgerald also wrote music for the 2019 musical Sex and Disability by Brighton based writer Damian Darkness. In 2021, Fitzgerald collaborated with fellow Brighton-based musician Georgia Train, of the band Bitter Ruin, on a new EP titled Mankind. Fitzgerald also teamed up with fellow Birdeatsbaby member Hana Maria (under the name Hana Piranha) to form HVIRESS, self-described as an "electronic occult duo". Their debut single "Arrival" was released on May 28, 2021.

Since 2010, Fitzgerald has also worked as a music teacher.

== Personal life ==
Fitzgerald has suffered from depression for most of her life. She has said that the name "Birdeatsbaby" came to her in a dream after a particularly long bout of insomnia in her teenage years, and that much of the material for the band's first album, Here She Comes-a-Tumblin', came from the nightmares and hallucinations she was experiencing at that time.

Fitzgerald has also openly discussed being sexually assaulted in her teen years, and how this has influenced her songwriting, stating, "Many of my songs are based around experience, I couldn’t help but use it at [sic] a subject matter as that kind of trauma can consume you and if you don’t get it out, then it can destroy you."

Fitzgerald is a feminist, as well as a vegan and animal rights activist.

She resides in Brighton with two pugs called Henry and George.

== Selected discography ==
Solo

- Present Company - 2013
- Ten Suitably Melancholy Pieces for the Gothic Piano Player - 2017
- Seraphim - 2017
- The Piano Conspires - 2020
- Alkonost - 2020

With Birdeatsbaby

- Here She Comes-a-Tumblin' - 2009
- Feast of Hammers - 2012
- The Bullet Within - 2014
- Tanta Furia - 2016
- The World Conspires - 2019

With CRIMSON VEIL

- HEX - 2024
