= Here She Comes-a-Tumblin' =

Studio album by Birdeatsbaby
- Released: 1 June 2009
- Genre: Progressive rock, dark cabaret
- Length: 38:59
- Producer: Alex Ball

Birdeatsbaby chronology
China Doll EP (2009)	Here She Comes-a-Tumblin' (2009)	Bigger Teeth (2010)

Here She Comes-a-Tumblin' is the debut studio album by English progressive rock band Birdeatsbaby, first released on 1 June 2009.

== Promotion and release ==
The album was preceded by the China Doll EP, which featured three tracks from the full album, released on 1 January 2008, as well as the free single "What You Are", released on 5 May 2009, which had been cut from the record.

On 1 April 2009 the band released their first ever music video, for the song "The Trouble..." to their official Youtube channel. The video, which features stop motion-style imagery of the band performing the song, remains the most popular one on the channel with over 470,000 views as of 2021. Videos for the songs "I Always Hang Myself With The Same Rope" and "Miserable" were also uploaded around this time, but have since been made private.

Shortly after the album's release, beginning on 18 June 2009, the band went on their first tour to promote the album, making stops in the UK and Europe. Brighton-based drag queen Mister Joe Black accompanied them as their supporting act.

== Reception ==
The album received generally positive reviews. The Glasgow-based independent music review site Bluesbunny said of Here She Comes A Tumblin', "There might well still be hope for popular music. Pomp, circumstance and dare I say it, real style are making a comeback." Danny Wadeson of The 405 praised the instrumentation and commented, "It’s not often that a band or one of their albums conveys such a strong sense of personality, not contrived, just an unchained force of eccentric passion, and rarer still on a debut."

== Track listing ==
All tracks are written by Mishkin Fitzgerald (except where noted)

No.	Title	Writer(s)	Length
1.	"Intro"		0:31
2.	"Seventeen"		5:33
3.	"I Always Hang Myself With The Same Rope"	Fitzgerald, McDonald	4:10
4.	"Shiver Up The Spine"		3:58
5.	"Miserable"		2:13
6.	"Jim"		2:39
7.	"Here She Comes-a-Tumblin'"		1:05
8.	"Hymn"		3:07
9.	"Jacqueline"		3:18
10.	"China Doll"		3:33
11.	"The Trouble..."		4:36
12.	"Letter to Charlie"	Fitzgerald, McDonald	4:10
Total length:			38:59

== Personnel ==
- Mishkin Fitzgerald (credited as Mishkin Mullaly) - Vocals, piano, writing
- Garry Mitchell - Guitar and bass
- Keely McDonald - Violin, backing vocals, writing
- Ella Stimey - Cello
- Philippa Bloomfield - Drums, artwork
