= Pig (1998 film) =

- Original 1998 VHS cover of Pig.
- Directed by: Rozz Williams; Nico B.
- Written by: Rozz Williams; Nico B.
- Produced by: Nico B.
- Starring: Rozz Williams; James Hollan
- Production companies: Open Eye Productions; Cult Epics
- Distributed by: CAV Distributing
- Release date: 1998
- Running time: 23 minutes
- Country: United States
- Language: English

Pig is a 1998 experimental, psychological horror, short film directed and produced by American underground film maker Nico B. and co-directed by and starring deathrock pioneer Rozz Williams. The film co-stars James Hollan and was distributed by the CAV Distributing company in South San Francisco and produced by the studios Open Eye Productions and Cult Epics. (The latter of which Nico B. is the founder and owner.)

== Background ==
Running about 23 minutes, Pig is a disjointed, heavily stylized and minimalistic film depicting a serial killer (Williams) journeying out to an abandoned house in Death Valley where he proceeds to ritualistically murder an unidentified man (Hollan). The film details their unspoken relationship through sadomasochism and symbolism.

== Plot ==
Pig opens with a scene of the black-garbed killer preparing to leave a small house. The individual places several items into a briefcase, appearing among them a deck of cards, a notebook, and a copy of the children's novel Mr. Pig and Sonny Too — an actual publication written in 1977 by the American author Lillian Hoban.

The individual closes up his briefcase, standing upright and turning to reveal on camera the bleeding, half-naked body of another man lying prostrate on the floor. The living man kicks aside the corpse of the dead one and continues downstairs, placing his belongings into a black car and driving away along a deserted road.

The driver continues through the outstretched desert, with power lines lining the side of the dirt trail. His vehicle passes an outcrop of rocks with an inscription painted on its face. Although perhaps being unintelligible, it appears to read either as "ELLE" or "ELLIE". Another sign crops up immediately after, written in black, reading Dead Man’s Point, though this is almost unreadable.

The film cuts to another individual, the unidentified man (Hollan), masked in white bandages covering his head. He wanders through the desert until reaching a telephone pole and sitting down, cross-legged.

The driver's car pulls up to the side of the road, and the masked figure enters on the passenger's side. The two drive down another path and stop at a small house. Upon exiting the vehicle, the film continues to a shot of the driver/killer leading the masked figure by a rope which binds his wrists, all the while carrying his briefcase. The dilapidated doorway to the house is shown to have the number "1334" laid out in small bones at the top, otherwise adorned with dominoes, a crucifix, caution tape, a glove, a knife, and various photographs of someone's arms and head being bound.

As the camera zooms onto the door frame, the scene cuts to the victimized masked man's arms being tied with gauze tape, and then finally at the bottom of the doorway a box of dominoes opens up to reveal a keyhole. Through the keyhole, a pig mask can be seen sticking through a broken wall. It is revealed that the killer is wearing the mask and pacing about the house.

The scene cuts again to a corridor in the house—the word "Look" is graffitied along the wall, where the masked man is bound at the wrists to a rope connected to the ceiling. The camera spins around the room before showing the two men outside again, this time the masked victim being led by his rope into a cellar. There the victimizer empties his entire briefcase, among his things a deck of pornographic cards, a large metal key, a wig, a black die with a chaosphere engraved on one side, a bondage mask, gloves, a chain, a bowie knife and other assorted cutlery, a cleaver, a pair of pliers, papers, at least two pairs of scissors, a plastic funnel with a feeding tube, and (perhaps most importantly) a book entitled Why God Permits Evil, among other items.

The captor places his hand on the head of the now once-more bound-to-the-ceiling victim and pulls part of the bandage-mask from his eye, exposing his darting gaze and sense of fear. A collection of pliers, knives, scissors, syringes, and other instruments from the briefcase can be seen below.

In the next scene, the killer is turning through the pages of Why God Permits Evil, revealing strange, graphic art and religious quotes. The camera then cuts to the victim, his head still gauzed, with the feeding tube in his mouth. The killer pours what appears to be blood through the funnel, into the victim's mouth, causing him to gag and choke, spitting it up onto his naked torso.

== Cast ==
- James Hollan
- Rozz Williams

== Release ==
=== Home media ===
The film was released for the first time on DVD by Cav Distribution on April 2, 2002. It was later released by Cult Epics on March 27, 2007 as a part of its Cinema of Death movie pack. Cult Epics later re-released the film as a double-feature on January 29, 2013, alongside 1334 (2012).

== Reception ==
Dan Lopez from Digitally Obsessed.com gave the film a grade B, stating that the film "manages to be very disturbing and artistically impressive by doing very little, despite being a bit heavy-handed with some of its imagery." Horror News.net gave the film a positive review, comparing the film to E. Elias Merhige's Begotten (1989), writing, "Rozz has attempted to transition his collage work stylings into film resulting in a very odd culty kind of short film experience. It’s a film that beckons discussion alluding to more philosophical statements in dissection." William Harrison of DVD Talk, while stating the film was not for everyone, praised the film as being both "disturbing", and a deep exploration into death, pain, and human nature.
