= Every King a Bastard Son =

Studio album by Rozz Williams
- Released: October 16, 1992
- Genre: Spoken word
- Label: Cleopatra Records
- Producer: Rozz Williams

Rozz Williams chronology
Every King a Bastard Son (1992)	Dream Home Heartache (1995)

Every King a Bastard Son is the debut solo album by American musician Rozz Williams, formerly of deathrock band Christian Death. It was released on October 16, 1992. It was described by reviewer Benjamin Harper as "alternatingly demonic, melancholic and tragic." He described "The Evil Ones" as a track "of special note". Authors for alternative music magazine Trouser Press described the album's lyrics as "the most hair-raising poetry likely to be encountered outside a satanic cult read-in", calling the album a "deliberately horrific creation" featuring "sickening" sound effects.

== Track listing ==
No.	Title	Length
1.	"Whorse"	3:51
2.	"Mind Fuck (Soundtrack to Murder)"	4:51
3.	"The Beast (Invocation)"	6:10
4.	"Currents"	4:05
5.	"To He Who Shall Come After (Mystic Fragments)"	4:47
6.	"The Evil Ones"	3:27
7.	"No Soldier (Cloak of Shit)"	8:12
8.	"Walls/Voices"	6:09

== Personnel ==
- Donato Canzonieri - Arrangement, bass, guitar and album text
- Erik Christides - Artwork and cover design
- Ace Farren Ford - Arrangement, cello and musette
- Wayne James - Engineering and mixing
- Paris Sadonis - Arrangement and keyboards
- Rozz Williams - Arrangement, artwork, collage, keyboards, vocals, production and slide guitar
