= Hyaena Gallery =

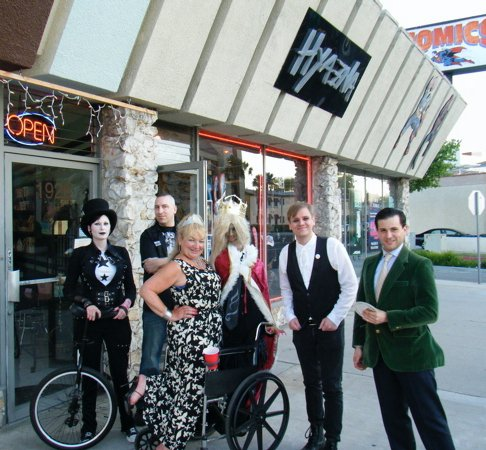
- Artists gather outside Hyaena Gallery for a book signing (L to R) artist Spinestealer, owner Bill Shafer, Public Access star Francine Dancer, author and illustrator Lorin Morgan-Richards, and magician Joseph Schneider. Burbank, California, 2010.
- Established: April 1, 2006
- Location: Burbank, California; 1928 W Olive Ave
- Website: www.hyaenagallery.com

Hyaena Gallery is located in Burbank, California with a specialty in macabre, low-brow and outsider art.

Owner Bill Shafer began the gallery in 2006 and has since won accolades for Best Darks Arts Gallery (2011) and Best Spooky Emporium (2012) as well as received national attention for celebrity related shows such as for Charlie Sheen in 2011, internationally artist participated tribute shows and hosting unique museum exhibits, including one for the late Rozz Williams curated by A Raven Above Press. The gallery also represents the art of artist and co-founder of Marilyn Manson, Gidget Gein

The Hyaena Gallery is notable for its permanent exhibition of horror related film pieces and artwork made by serial killers. Shafer curates to "highlight what I think is truly valuable, not just what is perceived as valuable because it is a current trend."
