= The Bullet Within =

Studio album by Birdeatsbaby
- Released: 14 July 2014
- Studios: AudioBeach, Brighton & Hove, UK
- Genres: Progressive rock, dark cabaret
- Length: 38:59
- Label: Dead Round Eyes
- Producer: Forbes Coleman

Birdeatsbaby chronology
Feast of Hammers (2012)	The Bullet Within (2014)	Tanta Furia (2016)

The Bullet Within is the third studio album by English progressive rock band Birdeatsbaby, released on 14 July 2014 through the band's own label, Dead Round Eyes. Production of the album was largely funded via the crowdfunding platform Kickstarter.

== Background, promotion and release ==
On 8 October 2013 the band released a music video for a new single, "Ghosts", on their official Youtube channel, directed by Matt Pulzer and Mishkin Fitzgerald.

Having spent much of 2013 recording for The Bullet Within with producer Forbes Coleman at AudioBeach Studios in Brighton, the band could not afford to finish the process of mixing, mastering, promotion and distribution, and decided to set up a Kickstarter campaign in order to finish the album and go on another tour. The campaign was launched on 4 November that year, with an all-or-nothing goal of £10,000. Rewards at various tiers included limited edition merchandise, tickets to the album launch party, and the opportunity to have dinner with the band, among other things. On 7 November musician Amanda Palmer tweeted her support for the project, and on 18 November burlesque performer Veronica Varlow did the same. On 2 December, three days before the end of the campaign, the project met its funding goal. On 3 December a 30-second "teaser" video for the album was uploaded to the Birdeatsbaby Youtube channel. That same day, author Neil Gaiman also tweeted his support of the project. The Kickstarter ended on 5 December, with a final total of just over £11,000.

On 15 March 2014 a music video for the track "The Bullet", directed an animated by Simon Carter, was released on the official Birdeatsbaby Youtube channel. The song was also released as a single with a cover of Muse's "Muscle Museum" as a B-side. On 1 July a video was released for the song "Spiders", featuring Gabby Young and directed by former Birdeatsbaby drummer Philippa Bloomfield.

In the summer of 2014, the band went on a short tour of the UK and Ireland, beginning at the YouBloom Festival in Dublin on 14 June. On 11 July 2014 the band held an album launch party, playing a show at The Macbeth in London, featuring musician Emberhoney as their opening act. The full album was released on 14 July.

After its release, the band continued to put out music videos for songs from the album, beginning with "Hands Of Orlac" on 5 February 2015. This was followed by a videos for "Tenterhooks" (11 March) and the B-side track "Muscle Museum" (13 May). A video for the song "Silence" was released on 28 September, directed by longtime Birdeatsbaby collaborator Dominic William Stoate. The video features graphic imagery of slaughterhouses, provided by the animal rights organizations PETA and Viva!, projected over Fitzgerald's face as she sings. Finally, a video for "My Arms Will Open Wide", directed by Richard Anthony Dunford, was released on 4 November 2015.

== Music and lyrics ==
Fitzgerald has categorized The Bullet Within as a concept album, saying, "From the artwork to the lyrics- everything is related and connected. Each song will take you to a different place, different instrumentation, different ideas, but with the Birdeatsbaby signature dark sound going all the way through." She also expressed a desire for the album to span more genres, reach a wider audience and break out of the "niche" she felt the previous two Birdeatsbaby albums had been stuck in, while still appealing to their "cult-like" fanbase. On their Kickstarter page, the band described the album as "based on the concept of personal struggle, a burden, something that everyone carries with them like 'a bullet within'," but also that it "celebrates the highs and lows of the human condition", with themes touching on disillusionment, escapism, alcoholism, and suicide.

It was also a step away from the sound of the band's previous two albums, being the first Birdeatsbaby record to heavily feature synthesizer.

Fitzgerald has stated that the song "My Arms Will Open Wide" was written "as a suicide letter" during a depressive episode. This is reflected in the video for the song, which portrays Fitzgerald leaving behind a literal suicide note before jumping off of a bridge. She said, "When we made the video I was standing on the bridge and I was like, f*ck, I really don’t want to fall. It was a good feeling to not want to die. It turns out I had more albums to write and a lot more music to give the world."

"Hands of Orlac" is a reference to the film of the same name.

== Reception ==
Professional ratings
Review scores
Source	Rating
Louder Than War	9/10 stars
Brutal Resonance	8.5/10 stars

The album garnered generally positive reviews. Paul Scott-Bates of Louder Than War gave the album 9 out of 10 and said, while at times overly-complex, "BirdEatsBaby have nailed it with their attempt of a punk-rock meets classical meets cabaret effort," and called it, "nothing short of superbly arranged and produced". Steven Gullotta of Brutal Resonance called it "dark, gorgeous, and mature," saying the album "presents some of the finest gothic music I've heard in a while." Michael Johnson of Nemesis To Go said of the album, "Birdeatsbaby don't so much write songs as mini-musicals," and "Dynamics, atmospherics, and theatrics are cunningly deployed throughout, and it's all given a big, rich production that puts the listener front-centre of the stalls in Birdeatsbaby's opera house." Adam Kidd of Brigtonsfinest praised the production style, saying "sonically this album is light years ahead of their earlier releases, each song boasts layers of clever little audio details which reward the attentive listener." The track "Tenterhooks" was included on R2 Magazine's compilation CD, Un-Herd Volume 47.

== Track listing ==
No.	Title	Length
1.	"The Bullet"	4:06
2.	"Drinking In The Day"	3:43
3.	"Enemies Like Me"	5:54
4.	"Ghosts"	3:29
5.	"Hands of Orlac"	3:25
6.	"Into The Black"	1:08
7.	"Interlude"	0:57
8.	"Tenterhooks"	3:26
9.	"Spiders"	3:52
10.	"The Lighthouse"	3:56
11.	"My Arms Will Open Wide"	3:42
12.	"Silence"	4:13
Total length:		41:56

== Personnel ==
Musicians

- Mishkin Fitzgerald - Vocals, piano
- Garry Mitchell - Guitar, bass
- Tessa Giles - Violin, backing vocals
- Katha Rothe - Drums, backing vocals
- Forbes Coleman - Synths, programming, additional guitar and drums
- Keely McDonald - Additional violin, viola and vocals
- Ella Stirmey - Additional cello and vocals
- Melora Creager - Cello on track 6
- Gabby Young - Additional vocals on track 9

Technical

- Forbes Coleman - Recording and mixing
- Phil Joannides - Mastering
- Jack Flamel - Cover art
- Marcos Alegria - Photography
