= Welcome to Our Nightmare: A Tribute to Alice Cooper =

Welcome To our Nightmare: A Tribute To Alice Cooper

Compilation album by Various artists
- Released: 1993
- Genres: Heavy metal; glam rock; punk rock; industrial music; no wave; post-punk; noise rock; alternative rock
- Length: 110:25
- Label: Triple X
- Producers: Peter Heur; Dean Naleway

Welcome To our Nightmare: A Tribute To Alice Cooper is a tribute album to Alice Cooper. Released in 1993 on Triple X Records, the album features covers of various Alice Cooper songs from a variety of rock artists.

== Liner notes ==
The album features liner notes by Wayne Kramer, MC5 guitar player and founder. It reads:

So I'm sitting in the dressing room of this club in Philadelphia back in '69 waiting for show time, and somebody sticks a head in the door and asks, "is the MC5 gonna wear their sparkly clothes tonight?" "Who wants to know?" I ask. "Alice Cooper," is the response. So I'm wondering why this woman from the other band is interested in what my band is wearing. Sure, we had some flashy stage outfits, sorta James Brown meets the Who. It wasn't until later that night I discovered Alice Cooper was no girl singer, but a guy with a very weird bunch of other guys with some very strange ideas of their own.

Soon after this gig they moved their base of operations from L.A. to Detroit, and we began seeing more and more of them. Since we shared booking agents, we often appeared on the same bill together. And for a moment, there may have been a friendly rivalry over which band would be the most outrageous.

As for the MC5, outrageousness got us fired for unprofessional conduct. Outrageousness got us arrested, beaten, jailed, and ultimately dissed by a system that didn't want to hear what we were saying.

The good news is that Alice Cooper got over. Like a big dog. Their brand of gothic horror camp entertainment found its audience in the disconnected youth of the Seventies. It was a time when local detroit area gigs at teen clubs and mini-pop festivals were turning into arena-rock on a grand scale. It's to Alice's credit that his vision helped make this happen. This wasn't the Partridge Family or Saturday Night Fever. More like the Addams Family with electric guitars at the Saturday Night Massacre. Great fun. Very healthy.

These CDs represent a body of work of which Alice and his bandmates can be justifiably proud. The groups that covered the material have all done an exceptional job of being true to the spirit of the originals while putting some Nineties energy on it. Twenty-three songs by twenty-three bands is a big order. Musically, Alice (and the bands here) always seemd [sic] to find a slightly skewed way of playing, of avoiding the commonplace chord changes or guitar melodies. Shows that thinking can be fun. You don't have to dig very deep to hear the influence of Alice had on the current crop of metal bands.

It's not a pretty job to explore the dark side. Good thing Alice Cooper has this way come.

== Track listing ==
Disc One
No.	Title	Music	Performer(s)	Length
1.	"Reflected"	Alice Cooper	Dramarama	3:07
2.	"Levity Ball"	Alice Cooper	Wallison Ladmoh	4:52
3.	"Refrigerator Heaven"	Alice Cooper, Michael Bruce, Glen Buxton, Dennis Dunaway and Neal Smith	John Trubee & The Ugly Janitors Of America	1:59
4.	"Lay Down and Die, Goodbye"	Alice Cooper	Of Cabbages and Kings	5:21
5.	"Caught in a Dream"	Michael Bruce	Rubber City Rebels	2:58
6.	"Black Juju"	Dennis Dunaway	Lydia Lunch & Rowland S. Howard	9:22
7.	"Second Coming/Ballad of Dwight Fry"	Alice Cooper and Michael Bruce	Bug Lamp	9:40
8.	"Sun Arise"	Harry Butler and Rolf Harris	Flaming Lips	5:21
9.	"Under My Wheels"	Michael Bruce, Dennis Dunaway and Bob Ezrin	Bulimia Banquet	4:03
10.	"Halo of Flies"	Alice Cooper, Dennis Dunaway, Michael Bruce and Glen Buxton	Haunted Garage	7:31
11.	"Desperado"	Alice Cooper and Michael Bruce	Chris Connelly	3:26

Disc Two
No.	Title	Music	Performer(s)	Length
1.	"Dead Babies/Killer"	Alice Cooper, Neal Smith, Glen Buxton, Michael Bruce, Dennis Dunaway	Shadow Project	9:09
2.	"School's Out"	Alice Cooper and Michael Bruce	Reverb Motherfuckers	3:33
3.	"Generation Landslide"	Alice Cooper, Glen Buxton, Dennis Dunaway, Neal Smith and Michael Bruce	Claw Hammer	5:00
4.	"Working Up a Sweat"	Alice Cooper and Michael Bruce	Royal Court of China	3:58
5.	"Teenage Lament"	Alice Cooper and Michael Bruce	Tyla	2:26
6.	"Welcome To My Nightmare"	Alice Cooper and Dick Wagner	Cold Ethyl	5:14
7.	"Cold Ethyl"	Alice Cooper and Robert Ezrin	Carnival Art	2:43
8.	"Only Women Bleed"	Alice Cooper and Dick Wagner	The Hangmen	7:26
9.	"Serious"	Alice Cooper, Steve Lukather, David Foster and Bernie Taupin	Sloppy Seconds	2:17
10.	"Clones"	David Carron	They Eat Their Own	3:51
11.	"Pain"	Alice Cooper, Fred Mandel and David Johnstone	Dutchess de Sade	4:19
12.	"Poison"	Alice Cooper, Desmond Child and John McCurry	The Vandals	2:49

== Personnel ==
- Bruce S. L. Duff — Project Coordinator (Tapes & Phones)
- Peter Heur — Executive Producer
- Dean Naleway — Executive Producer
- Dan Hirsch — Mastering
- Lisa Sutton — Art direction
- David Griffith - Cover Photo
- Alex Leon, Jr. (Shark) - Inside Photos
