= Live in Berlin (Rozz Williams album) =

Live album by Rozz Williams
- Released: February 15, 2000
- Recorded: October 19, 1993
- Venues: Pfefferberg, Berlin, Germany
- Length: 40:43

Rozz Williams chronology
Whorse's Mouth (1997)	Live in Berlin (2000)	Accept the Gift of Sin (2003)

Live in Berlin is the first live album by the American musician Rozz Williams, formerly of the deathrock band Christian Death. It was released by Triple X Records on February 15, 2000. Musically, the album is a lot heavier than many of Williams's other releases, with a sound similar to the Spiders from Mars or the New York Dolls. It was recorded in October 1993, shortly before the CD/Vinyl release of Daucus Karota. The album includes songs that had never before been released.

== Credits ==
- Brian Butler - Guitar
- Edward Colver - Photography
- Christian Omar Madrigal Izzo - Drums
- Rozz Williams - Vocals
- Jeff Zimmitti - Design

== Track listing ==
No.	Title	Length
1.	"Love Lies"	3:01
2.	"Sunken Rags"	3:42
3.	"Red Handed"	3:54
4.	"2 Steps"	4:51
5.	"Nothing"	4:21
6.	"Lord of the Flies"	6:45
7.	"World Inside"	3:28
8.	"Working on Beyond"	4:50
9.	"The Stranger"	2:54
10.	"Days of Glory"	2:57
