= Modern Warfare (band) =

American punk rock band

- Origin: Long Beach, California
- Genres: Punk rock, hardcore punk
- Years active: 1980–1983
- Labels: Bemisbrain Records; Enigma Records
- Past members: Jimmy Bemis; Tim Gains; Steve Sinclair; Ron Gowdy; Randy Scott; Tish Lucca

Modern Warfare was an American early-1980s punk rock band from Long Beach, California. It featured Jim Bemis (guitar and lead vocals), Tim Gaines (bass), Steve Sinclair (bass), Ron Goudie (lead guitar), Randy Scott (drums), and Tish Lucca (Keyboards).

Bemis wrote most of the songs, and also lent his name to the band's label, Bemisbrain Records (sometimes written as two words, "Bemis Brain"). Bemisbrain (the name was reportedly a play on the Bemis Manufacturing Company, maker of toilet seats, though this was never confirmed by the band) issued records by several other punk and deathrock bands, including Tex & the Horseheads, Nip Drivers, Mnemonic Devices, and Super Heroines, as well as the two Hell Comes to Your House compilation albums.

== Discography ==
- Modern Warfare (7-inch EP, 1980, Bemisbrain Records)
- Modern Warfare No. 2 (7-inch EP, 1981, Bemisbrain Records)

=== Compilation appearances ===
- Hell Comes to Your House (1981)
  - Includes "Out of My Head" and "Street Fightin' Man"
- American Youth Report (1982)
  - Includes "One for All"
- Life Is Boring So Why Not Steal This Record (1983)
  - Includes "Moral Majority"
