= Tanta Furia =

Studio album by Birdeatsbaby
- Released: 7 November 2016
- Studio: AudioBeach, Brighton & Hove, UK
- Genre: Progressive rock
- Length: 47:00
- Label: Dead Round Eyes
- Producer: Forbes Coleman, Mishkin Fitzgerald

Birdeatsbaby chronology
The Bullet Within (2014)	Tanta Furia (2016)	The World Conspires (2019)

Tanta Furia is the fourth studio album by English progressive rock band Birdeatsbaby, first released 7 November 2016 through the band's own label, Dead Round Eyes.

== Promotion and release ==
After the successful crowd funding of their previous album, The Bullet Within, via Kickstarter, the band launched a Patreon page to provide a more stable source of funding.

In early 2015, the band announced their new lineup, including Forbes Coleman (who had produced The Bullet Within and Mishkin Fitzgerald's 2013 solo album Present Company) as drummer, and violinist Hana Maria (also known as Hana Piranha).

In April 2016, the band put out the double side-A single No Mirror / Baby Steps, embarking on a short tour of Europe to promote it. Throughout the Summer of 2016, they continued to preview songs from the new album on Patreon.

In September of that year, Birdeatsbaby toured the East coast of the US with the band Sit Kitty Sit. The two bands also collaborated on a split single, Creeping / Part of Me, available only as a limited edition vinyl release. The first single from Tanta Furia, "Temple", along with an accompanying music video, was released on 16 September.

On 5 November, the band performed an album launch party at Surya in London, with the band Hands Off Gretel opening. This served as the start of another tour of Europe and the UK, this time to promote the new album. Tanta Furia was released in full, as both a CD and an MP3 download, on 7 November. In May 2017, the album was also released as a limited edition orange vinyl record. The title, Spanish for "so much fury", was intended as a nod to Birdeatsbaby's devoted Mexican fanbase.

As with all their previous releases, the band released several music videos to their official Youtube channel both before and after the release of the album, first for the song "Temple" on 16 September 2016. This was followed by a video for the song "Mary", directed by Richard Anthony Dunford, on 3 November which features Fitzgerald as a demonic priest.

On 22 February, the band released a video for "Eulogy", in which Fitzgerald walks around Brighton in a daze while drinking from a bottle Jim Beam. Fitzgerald expressed her desire for the video to be honest about her struggle with depression, saying "Let's just say it might be a little close to the bone and some of you may have experienced this too." A video for "Spit" was released on 11 August. The final video from the album, "Deathbed Confession", was released on 17 August and features the band dressed in military garb and riding a tank, taking stylistic inspirations from the comic Tank Girl.

== Music and lyrics ==
Themes of religion, sexuality and death are prevalent throughout much of the album.

The song "Mary", inspired by Fitzgerald's rejection of her religious upbringing, was written as a comment on the disparity between the Virgin Mary's significance as "the feminine symbol of God", and the treatment of women by the Catholic church: "So I turned the Hail Mary into a poem about how the church uses a male figure to press down on women and keep them in place."

Fitzgerald has said that "Deathbed Confession", written some time in 2010, was not about any person in particular, but about "politics, human nature" and the tendency for religion to be "used as a reason to go to war".

The song "Temple" used to be introduced on stage, according to Fitzgerald, with the words "a good song should make you want to fight someone, f*ck someone or kill yourself".

Tanta Furia was seen as a step away from the group's cabaret-style roots, toward a heavier, more punk and metal inspired tone, but still featuring much of the orchestration and classical elements on display in their previous records. The album as saw the band begin to expand their instrumentation, with Fitzgerald playing accordion on the title track, as well as contributions from Brighton-based Gospel choir group The Dulcetones.

== Reception ==
The album received generally positive reviews. Mike Aniscoe of Louder Than War said the album "confirms their position as a band with an originality in combining orchestral and intricate arrangements with a sense of the absurb and splashes of the weird. A musical oddity but all the better for their vaguely avant garde conceptions." Jez Rowden of The Progressive Aspect said of the album, "The songs are exquisitely dark, full of pointed words and open expressions of emotion," and "The success of Tanta Furia lies in the fact that the influences are taken and moulded into a whole that is fully representative of the band as they now stand." Emma Roebuck of Progradar said "This record is not for everyone, it’s marmite in the same way that Knifeworld are but also a musical universe away," while also saying, "The music is dark, chaotic, manically varied and caustic but, most of all, it’s brilliant fun." Adam Kidd of Brightonsfinest said, "This is certainly Birdeatsbaby’s most ambitious work to date, a perfect dose of esoterica for fans of theatrical rock music and alternative aesthetics."

Tanta Furia came in at number 67 on NPR's All Songs Considered Listener Poll of the top 100 albums of 2016.

== Track listing ==
All tracks are written by Mishkin Fitzgerald (except where noted)

No.	Title	Writer(s)	Length
1.	"In Spite Of You"		5:35
2.	"Part of Me"		3:05
3.	"Scars"	Fitzgerald, Maria	4:27
4.	"Deathbed Confession"		4:19
5.	"Temple"	Fitzgerald, Maria	3:51
6.	"Elliot"		3:44
7.	"Spit"	Fitzgerald, Mitchell	3:14
8.	"Mary"		4:55
9.	"Bones of God"		4:07
10.	"Tanta Furia"		4:12
11.	"Eulogy"		5:25
Total length:			47:00

== Personnel ==
Musicians

- Mishkin Fitzgerald - Vocals, piano, accordion
- Garry Mitchell - Guitar, bass, backing vocals
- Hana Maria - Violin, cello, backing vocals
- Forbes Coleman - Drums, synths, programming, backing vocals
- Alfie Weedon - Double bass
- The Dulcetones - Gospel choir

Technical

- Forbes Coleman - Recording and mixing
- Phil Joannides - Mastering
- Jack Flamel - Artwork
