= Super Heroines =

American deathrock band

- Super Heroines (from left: Del Mar Richardson, Eva O, Sandra Lynn Rosendin)

Background information
- Origin: Los Angeles, California, United States
- Genres: Deathrock
- Years active: 1981-1988
- Labels: Bemisbrain, Cleopatra
- Past members: Eva O (Eva Ortiz), Sandra Ross (Sandra Lynn Rosendin), Del Mar Richardson, Jill Emery, Steve Darrow, China Figueroa, Cat Noel (Cathy Falanga)

The Super Heroines were an American deathrock trio founded in Los Angeles by guitarist and vocalist Eva O (Eva Ortiz) in 1981. The original line-up included bassist Sandra Ross (Sandra Lynn Rosendin), a member of Eva O's previous group, the Speed Queens, and drummer Del Mar Richardson. Along with Christian Death, 45 Grave, and Kommunity FK, the band helped define the Los Angeles deathrock genre that emerged from the L.A. punk-rock scene in the late 1970s and early 1980s.

The group's influences included Joan Jett and the Runaways, Alice Cooper, Black Sabbath, and Kiss. Guitarist Rikk Agnew of the Adolescents, said of the band:

They rocked with somewhat of a dark tone… they had that dark look… yet it was rock, it was interesting. I was really fascinated by their appearance, their presence was really cool.

The Super Heroines performed at house parties and clubs in and around Los Angeles and San Francisco. They appeared at venues such as the Whisky a Go Go, the Cathay de Grande, and Anti Club and shared bills with other notable Los Angeles-based bands including Christian Death, Nervous Gender and Black Randy and the Metro Squad.

== Recordings ==
The band's first release, two songs that were originally intended for the Speed Queens, were Death on the Elevator and Embalmed Love. Both appeared on the 1981 compilation Hell Comes to Your House, released by Long Beach-based label Bemisbrain Records. Two other Speed Queens songs, I'm Not Here and Red, appeared on the group's first full-length album, Cry for Help, released by Bemisbrain the following year.

The band toured and recorded extensively following the release of their second album Souls that Save. Their third and final album, Love and Pain, includes material recorded in 1983 and other previously unreleased material, such as Black and Blue, recorded by the original line-up and intended for the Hell Comes to Your House compilation. It was released in 1993 by Cleopatra Records, some five years after the group had disbanded. The anthology, Super Heroines - Anthology 1982 - 1985, released in 2006, consists of recordings from their first two albums and rare tracks from Love and Pain.

== Influence ==
Dubbed the "queen of darkness", Eva O is regarded as an influential figure in the deathrock genre along with frontwomen Dinah Cancer of 45 Grave and Voodoo Church's Tina Winter.

== Post-band careers ==
Eva O was the only member of the Super Heroines to remain throughout its various line-up changes.

Some past members continued to perform with other groups while others pursued careers in radio, acting, modeling, and visual arts.

Bassist Sandra Lynn Rosendin, daughter of Los Angeles band-leader Freddie Ross, went on to perform along with her husband Jimmy Lee Smith in the Jimmy Lee Smith Band. The Las Vegas, Nevada-based group played blues and rock covers and released an album entitled You Keep Saying You're Leaving. The duo performed as members of a worship group in Nevada.

Original drummer Del Mar Richardson continued his music career and later pursued acting and modeling as well as radio and voiceover work. From 1988 to 1989, he was a member of the Bachelors Anonymous. In 2009, he appeared in the Eagles music video for "Busy Being Fabulous" and later in the KT Tunstall music video for "Feel It All" (2013). He produced, edited and wrote the fictional radio series Peter Tulkin: From Far Away (2018–2020) for Barcelona City FM 107.3 radio.

Eva O and bassist Jill Emery, along with Christian Death frontman Rozz Williams, formed the Shadow Project in 1987. Emery went on to play bass in alternative rock band Hole on their 1991 debut album Pretty on the Inside and later played bass in Mazzy Star and Teardrain. She is currently a visual artist.

Drummer Cat Noel (Cathy Falanga), with the band from 1986 to 1988, went on to appear on Manchester, Vermont-based radio station WEQX. She would later co-host the Darwin and Cat morning talk show on WINU, New York (formerly WZMR). She appeared on Wife Swap as a shock jock who trades lives with a woman who runs a pet crematorium. Since January 2012, Noel has appeared on the podcast version of Darwin and Cat.

Drummer Steve Darrow went on to play in Hollywood Rose, the pre-Guns N' Roses band that featured Axl Rose and Izzy Stradlin.

== Discography ==
=== Albums ===
- 1982 – Cry for Help, Bemisbrain Records
- 1983 – Souls that Save, Cleopatra Records
- 1993 – Love and Pain, Cleopatra

=== Singles ===
- 2011 – Embalmed Love, Horror Rock Records

=== Compilations ===
- 1981 – Hell Comes to Your House, Bemisbrain
- 2006 – Super Heroines - Anthology 1982 - 1985, Cleopatra
- 2006 – L.A. Riot Grrrls - The Best Of 1982-1985, Cleopatra
