= Pretty Balanced =

American piano rock band

- Pretty Balanced in 2007. Left to right: Forest Christenson, Jude Shimer, and Parker Ross. (photo by Noah A. Alloy)

Background information
- Origin: Columbus, Ohio, United States
- Genres: Piano rock, baroque pop
- Years active: 2004–2010
- Members: Jude Shimer; Forest Christenson; Parker Ross
- Past members: John Siddall

Pretty Balanced was an American band based in Columbus, Ohio, United States. Its unique sound is the result of a fusion of instruments often associated with chamber music, such as violin, cello, and piano, playing rock compositions, and often employing electronic production. Its members are Jude Shimer (also of The Sneaky Mister) on piano and cello, Forest Christenson (of Solarist, formerly The Liberty Tax, and Starving Goliath) on drums and violin, and Parker Ross (of El Jewbacabra) on bass.

== History ==
The band formed in 2004, while the members were attending Fort Hayes Metropolitan Education Center. The original lineup included John Siddall on bass, but he was replaced by Ross after leaving Columbus for college.

In 2005, the Pretty Balanced song "Simon's Sleeping" was featured on Projekt Records' compilation A Dark Cabaret, which sold nationally in Hot Topic stores.

In 2006, the band won second place in the Columbus Dispatch Battle of the Bands 3, winning $300 and five hours of recording time at John Schwab Recording.

After the members graduated from high school in 2006, the band went on a partial-hiatus, but still played shows throughout the Eastern and Midwest United States, and performed in the UK in 2008 and 2009.

In early 2009 they changed their name to "The Alphabet" and, in 2010, Shimer announced the band's breakup on their blog.

== Discography ==
Studio albums:

- Icicle Bicycle, 2006
- Conical Monocle, 2008
- Scarlet Starlet, 2009 (as The Alphabet)

Other releases:

- Free Public Consumption, 2005 (Demo)
- Re-mix-a Spektor, 2005 (EP)
- The Tape Dust, 2005 (EP)
- i.B. ReLease, 2006 (Live concert recording)

=== Appears on ===
- A Dark Cabaret, 2005

== See also ==
- Amanda Palmer
- List of dark cabaret artists
- Regina Spektor
- Evelyn Evelyn
