= Katzenjammer Kabarett =

French dark cabaret band

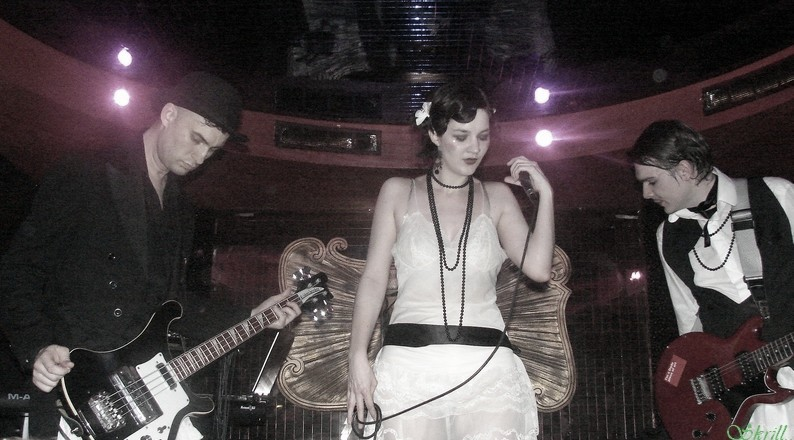
- Live in Paris (2008)

Background information
- Origin: Paris, France
- Genres: Dark cabaret, deathrock, electropunk
- Years active: 2004–present
- Labels: Subterfuge, Projekt
- Members: Herr Katz; Mary Komplikated; Klischee; Mr. Guillotine
- Website: www.katzenjammer-kabarett.com

Katzenjammer Kabarett is a French four-piece dark cabaret band from Paris, France. Aesthetically inspired by German Weimar-era cabarets and burlesque shows, the band's name is of German origin and literally translates to "cat's wail cabaret"; Katzenjammer also generally means "discordant sound" and is used as a synonym for a hangover. The band's other stylistic influences include Dadaism, Futurism, Symbolism and Postmodernism.

== History ==
The band was founded in 2004 by vocalist Mary Komplikated, guitarist Herr Katz, keyboardist Klischee and bass player Mr. Guillotine. In 2005 they released a self-titled EP which was freely distributed on their website. It was followed by their likewise self-titled debut album in 2006.

The band received critical acclaim and performed at several festivals, including the Wave-Gotik-Treffen 2006 in Leipzig, the Amphi Festival 2007 in Cologne and the Summer Darkness festival 2009 in Utrecht. They also performed as a supporting act for the American dark cabaret band The Dresden Dolls, to whom they are often compared. In January 2009, they released their second studio album, Grand Guignol & Variétés, on America's Projekt Records.

The band split up in 2009. In 2011, Klischee and Mr Guillotine formed a new band called Katzkab.

== Style ==
The band's musical style is a mixture of different genres including post-punk, death rock, electropunk, gothic rock, new wave music, electronic music, classical music and German "Lieder" (Romantic-era art songs). Referring to themselves as "death rock cabaret", "multireferential post-punk" and "baroque krautpop", the band also cites early New and dark wave bands like Bauhaus, Christian Death and Siouxsie and the Banshees as influences.

== Discography ==
=== Studio albums ===
- Katzenjammer Kabarett (2006)
- Grand Guignol & Variétés (2009)
- Object No. 1 (2013)

=== EPs ===
- Katzenjammer Kabarett (2005)

=== Compilations ===
- "Gemini Girly Song" on New Dark Age Vol. 2 (2004)
- "Eve at the Mansion" on Pagan Love Songs (2004)
- "Lie Sucks Not" on Gothic compilation No. 29 (2005)
- "Gemini Girly Song" on A Dark Cabaret (2005)
