= From the Heart (Shadow Project album) =

Studio album by Shadow Project
- Released: April 21, 1998
- Recorded: 1997–1998 at Trauma Ward
- Genre: Gothic rock, folk rock
- Length: 58:32
- Label: Hollows Hill
- Producer: Rozz Williams; Eva O

Shadow Project chronology
In Tuned Out - Live '93 (1994)	From the Heart (1998)	The Original Christian Death (2005)

From the Heart is the third and final album by American deathrock band Shadow Project, released in 1998 by Hollows Hill Records.

== Production ==
After Shadow Project's first split in 1993, Rozz Williams and Eva O divorced (but remained friendly) and Williams' heroin addiction increased. In 1997, they would once again reunite to record From the Heart. Nathan Van Hala of Christian metal group Saviour Machine was drafted to fill in the keyboard duties.

== Musical style ==
Considered a departure from previous albums, From the Heart included band material from previous records stripped down to just acoustic guitar and vocal duets.

== Themes ==
Released in 1994, Eva O's first solo debut shocked fans: she had converted to Christianity, and crafted a born-again concept album titled Demons Fall for an Angel's Kiss.

== Track listing ==
No.	Title	Lyrics	Music	Length
1.	"Static Jesus"	Eva O	Eva O	5:50
2.	"Forever Came Today"	Rozz Williams	Rozz Williams	4:35
3.	"Alpha and Omega"	Eva O	Eva O	5:31
4.	"Hall of Mirrors"	Rozz Williams	Rozz Williams	3:42
5.	"Million Years"	Eva O	Eva O	3:11
6.	"By God"	Eva O	Eva O	3:43
7.	"Holy Hell"	Eva O	Eva O	4:51
8.	"Hounds Upon the Hare"	Rozz Williams	Rozz Williams	4:52
9.	"Lying Deep"	Eva O	Eva O	5:36
10.	"Bitter Man"	Eva O	Eva O	4:10
11.	"Home Is Where"	Rozz Williams	Rozz Williams	5:06
12.	"Maybe Someday"	Eva O	Eva O	7:25

== Credits ==
Shadow Project

- Rozz Williams – vocals
- Eva O – vocals, backing vocals and acoustic guitar
- Michael Ciravolo – nylon-string guitar, 12-string guitar and bass guitar
- Nathan Van Hala – keyboards and programming
- Brian Virtue – keyboards and programming

Production

- Michael Ciravolo – producer, mixer
- Shadow Project – producer
- Michael Rozon – assemblage
- Mark Chalecki – mastering
- Lorin Crosby – photography
- Eva O – CD concept & design
