= Leesta Vall =

Leesta Vall Sound Recordings
- Founded: 2012
- Founder: Aaron Zimmer
- Defunct: 2024
- Country of origin: U.S.
- Location: Brooklyn, NY
- Official website: http://www.leestavall.com/

Leesta Vall Sound Recordings, or simply Leesta Vall, was an independent record label based in Brooklyn, NY. They specialized in limited runs of direct-to-vinyl 7" singles, each of which captured a unique take.

== Background ==
Leesta Vall was founded by musician Aaron Zimmer in 2012 as a booking agency. They discontinued the agency side of the business and as of 2017 focused exclusively on recording direct-to-vinyl releases that captured live performances. Each individual performance was lathe-cut directly to a 7" vinyl record using modified antique equipment from the 1950s. As of December 2024, the studio permanently ceased operations due to "circumstances beyond our control".

== Artists ==
Artists included Sondre Lerche, Wakey Wakey (band), Pat McGee, Matthew Mayfield, Tony Lucca, Gabe Dixon, Chris Ayer, and Phoebe Hunt (former member of The Belleville Outfit). While artists could apply to record at Leesta Vall, Zimmer described the roster as "pretty selective".

== See also ==
- List of record labels
