= Eva O =

American singer, songwriter, and guitarist (born 1961)

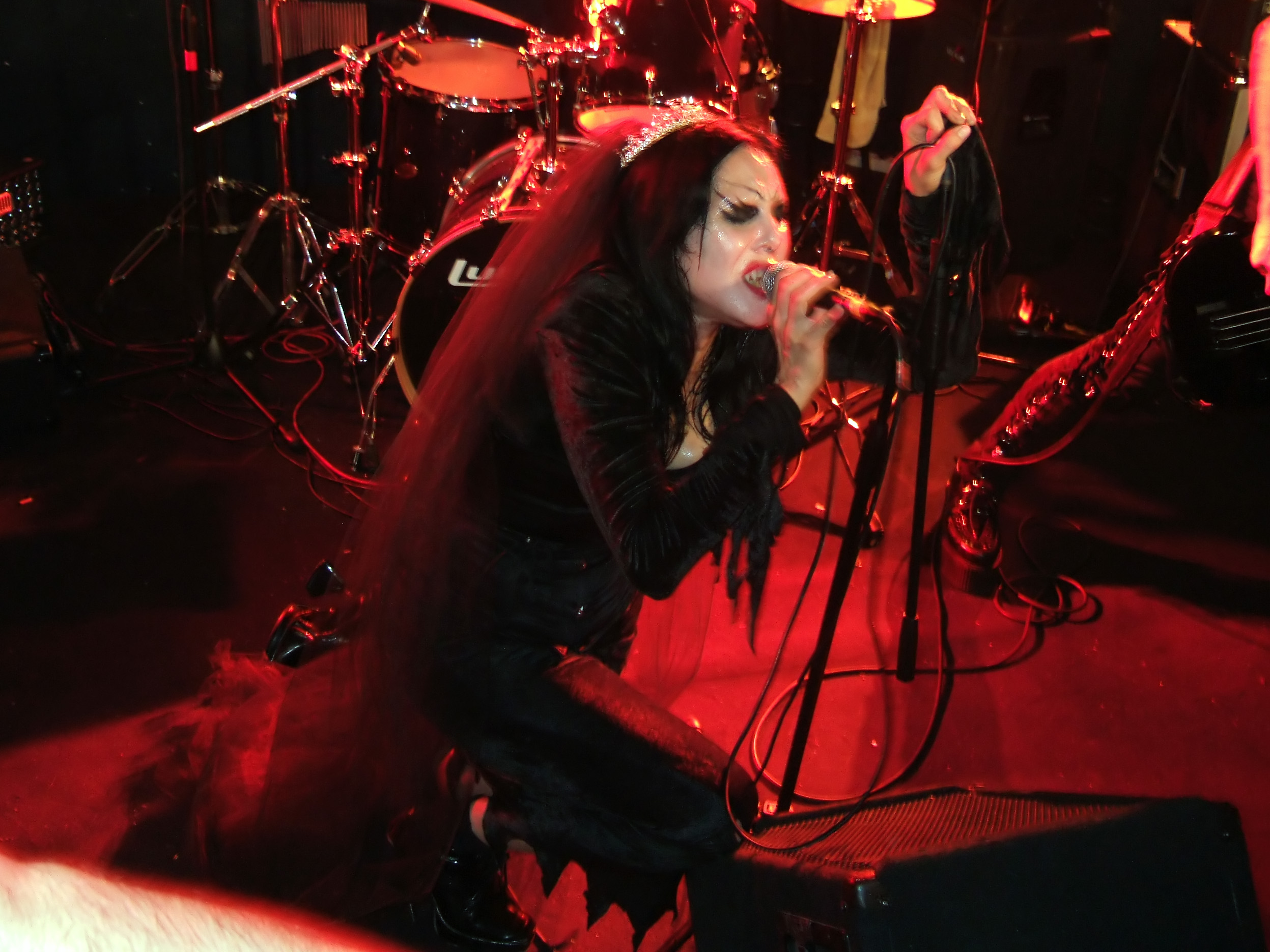
- Eva O performing with Christian Death 1334 in Italy, November 2007

Background information
- Born: Eva Ortiz; January 11, 1961 (age 65); Las Vegas, Nevada, U.S.
- Origin: Los Angeles, California, U.S.
- Genres: Deathrock, gothic rock, punk rock
- Occupations: Musician; singer; songwriter; guitarist; video artist
- Instruments: Vocals, guitar
- Years active: 1980–present
- Labels: Bemisbrain, Cleopatra, Triple X, Massacre
- Formerly of: Speed Queens, Super Heroines, Christian Death, Shadow Project
- Spouse(s): Rozz Williams (m. 1987; div. 1998); Alan Clayton (m. 1997; div. 1999) Edwin Borsheim (m. 2008; div. 2010)
- Website: https://evao.com

Eva Ortiz (born January 11, 1961), known professionally as Eva O, is an American singer, songwriter, guitarist, and video artist. A pioneer of the Los Angeles deathrock scene, she founded the all-female punk band Speed Queens in the late 1970s and the seminal deathrock trio Super Heroines in 1981. She provided backing vocals on Christian Death's influential 1982 debut Only Theatre of Pain and later contributed to reunion lineups. In 1987, she co-founded Shadow Project with her then-husband Rozz Williams of Christian Death.

Emerging from the L.A. punk underground, Eva O's theatrical performances, heavy guitar style, and macabre, introspective lyrics helped define deathrock alongside bands like Christian Death, 45 Grave, and Voodoo Church. Press and fans dubbed her the "Queen of Darkness" for her commanding presence and dark aesthetic. She has released a number of solo albums since the 1990s, including her latest, The Rise of Eva O (2018).

== Early life ==
Eva Ortiz was born on January 11, 1961, in Las Vegas, Nevada, to a Catholic military family. Of Mexican descent, with grandparents from Mexico, she grew up in modest circumstances with limited exposure to Spanish at home.

She began playing acoustic guitar as a child, becoming serious about the instrument at age 16, influenced by folk artist Cat Stevens.

At 18, in 1979, she relocated to Hollywood, Los Angeles, aspiring to form an all-girl band inspired by The Runaways' musicianship and defiance of "cutesy" stereotypes.

Her rock-guitar influences include Jimi Hendrix, Jimmy Page, Paul Stanley and Tony Iommi and she counts among her other influences David Bowie, Black Sabbath, Deep Purple, and Kiss.

== Career ==
=== Early bands ===
In Los Angeles, Eva O formed The Anemics (1979–1980), soon renamed the Speed Queens—an all-female hard punk band whose name was inspired by the American appliance maker. They played locally but disbanded before recording, though bassist Sandra Ross (Sandra Lynn Rosendin) carried over to her next project.

In 1981, she founded the Super Heroines with Ross and drummer Del Mar Richardson. The trio supplied two tracks to the 1981 Bemisbrain compilation Hell Comes to Your House.

Around this time, she met Rozz Williams and contributed backing vocals to Christian Death's 1982 debut Only Theatre of Pain. She briefly filled in on guitar after Rick Agnew's departure from the band.

Reflecting on the early L.A. scene: "There was a group of punk type people that all looked like vampire types... It was just a style. All of us were more into the macabre type things but we were still punk rock."

The Super Heroines released their debut album Cry for Help in 1982, followed the next year by Souls That Save (1983), blending punk aggression with emerging gothic elements. The band performed at venues like the Whisky a Go Go and shared bills with Christian Death, Nervous Gender, and others.

Super Heroines disbanded around 1987 amid internal issues as Eva O and Williams moved to San Francisco.

=== Shadow Project ===
In 1987, out of boredom and creative synergy, Eva O co-founded Shadow Project with husband Rozz Williams. The duo (with rotating members like Paris Sadonis on keyboards) released two studio albums: Shadow Project (1991) and Dreams for the Dying (1992) on Triple X, plus the live In Tuned Out (1994) and acoustic From the Heart (1998).

Despite Eva O contributing the bulk of the songwriting to the self-titled debut, her role was frequently overshadowed in the press by Williams—sometimes with the entire project wrongly attributed to him alone. In one instance, a photo of Eva O performing was mislabeled as Rozz Williams.

Frustrated, she contributed fewer songs to the second album. Their music evolved to darker, rage-filled themes amid personal struggles, including the 1992 L.A. riots during sessions.

She counts among her favorite shows a performance at New York City's Limelight, calling it "an awesome dream"

=== Solo career and later projects ===
Eva O launched her solo career in the early 1990s, releasing Past Time (1993), Demons Fall for an Angel's Kiss (1994), Damnation (Ride the Madness) (1999), Damnation/Salvation (2005), Eva O MDX1 Mental Mayhem (2014), and the acoustic-focused The Rise of Eva O (2018).

She formed projects like Mz. O and Her Guns and MDX1 featuring her daughter, Scarlet Dream, on bass. She also contributed to later works, including Charles East's 2024 album Dislocated.

She contributed original material, guitar and vocals to albums including The Iron Mask (1992), Path of Sorrows (1993), and Rage of Angels (1994).

While composing Angels Fall for a Demon's Kiss, reflecting her earlier involvement with darker, occult-influenced themes, Eva O underwent a spiritual transformation, eventually becoming an Orthodox Christian, and flipped the title of the record to Demon's Fall for an Angel's Kiss (1994). The album deals with themes of redemption, liberation, and light overcoming darkness.

In the 2020s, Eva O continued occasional live performances, including headline sets at goth and deathrock events. Notable appearances include Phantasmagoria Los Angeles on January 13, 2023, where she performed material from MDX and Shadow Project eras, and a May 7, 2023, show at DNA Lounge in San Francisco with guest musicians such as Alicia Vigil (Dragonforce) on bass. She also provided guest vocals on the track Resting in My Blood from South African experimental/piano-doom artist Charles East's debut full-length album Dislocated (released December 17, 2024, via Brucia Records), blending her gothic vocal style with the album's post-punk and doom elements. A music video for the track was released on Halloween 2024.

=== Christian Death reunions ===
Eva O participated in Christian Death reunions, including the 2007 "1334" lineup with Rikk Agnew and James McGearty, performing Only Theatre of Pain in its entirety.

On April 13, 2007, the group performed at the Henry Fonda Theatre in Los Angeles, "a highly emotional event with people flying in from all over the world to experience the original members re-creating the magik of what a Christian Death concert was like," according to Metal Underground. Christian Death 1334 subsequently toured in Europe.

In April 2026, she performed at the United Theater in Los Angeles in conjunction with the premiere of Rozz Williams: Romeo’s Distress, a documentary directed by Nico B. The performance featured Rikk Agnew and James McGearty, the guitarist and bassist, respectively, who appear on Only Theater of Pain.

== Artistry and Influence ==
Eva O is widely regarded as a foundational figure in deathrock, influencing subsequent generations of goth and punk musicians, particularly women in heavy music. Her evolution from punk roots to spiritually infused gothic work has been noted in scene histories.

Eva O's style emphasizes storytelling over technical musicianship: "I am more of a storyteller not musician ... I strive to stir passion, evoke emotion, thought and feeling in my audiences." Of her art, she has said: "My art, expression, creations all are my way I reach out, voice what I have experienced, seen or things that have touched me in such a way I feel I need to share. I strive to stir passion, evoke emotion, thought and feelings in my audience's eyes." Of performing: "I have high respect for performance. It is magic. I approach the set and open up myself for all the energies to pour into and out through. Like a medium."

== Equipment ==
She uses no effects, relying on an overdriven Marshall JCM2000 amplifier. Primary guitars include an Ibanez Iceman, ESP angel model, and Ovation acoustics.

== Personal life ==
Eva O married Rozz Williams in 1987; they divorced in 1998. She has a daughter, Scarlet Dream, with second husband Alan Clayton. She married Norwegian-born musician and film director Edwin Borsheim on August 8, 2008. She resides in Southern California.

== Discography ==
This is a selected discography of Eva O's major releases as a solo artist and with her primary associated bands.

=== Solo ===
- Past Time (1993, Cleopatra Records)
- Demons Fall for an Angel's Kiss (1994, Cleopatra Records; credited to Eva O Halo Experience; originally titled Angels Fall for a Demon's Kiss but rewritten post-conversion)
- Damnation (Ride the Madness) (1999, Massacre Records / Swan Lake)
- Damnation/Salvation (2005, Massacre Records; credited to Mz Eva O and Her Guns)
- Eva O MDX1 Mental Mayhem (2014, Cleopatra Records)
- The Rise of Eva O (2018, Cleopatra Records)

=== With Super Heroines ===
- Hell Comes to Your House (1981, Bemisbrain Records; various artists compilation, Super Heroines contribution)
- Cry for Help (1982, Bemisbrain/Enigma Records)
- Souls That Save (1983, Bemisbrain/Enigma Records)
- Love and Pain (1993, Cleopatra Records)
- Anthology 1982-1985 (2006, Cleopatra Records; compilation)
- Embalmed Love (2011, Horror Rock; single)

=== With Shadow Project ===
- Shadow Project (1991, Triple X Records)
- Dreams for the Dying (1992, Triple X Records)
- In Tuned Out (1994, Triple X Records; live)
- From the Heart (1998, Triple X Records; acoustic)

=== With Christian Death (selected) ===
Eva O contributed guitar and vocals to these albums during reunions/collaborations with Rozz Williams' version of the band.

- Only Theatre of Pain (1982, Frontier Records; backing vocals)
- The Iron Mask (1992, Cleopatra Records)
- Path of Sorrows (1993, Cleopatra Records)
- Rage of Angels (1994, Cleopatra Records)

=== Guest appearances and notable collaborations ===
Eva O has made numerous guest appearances, primarily providing vocals or guitar on goth, deathrock, and compilation releases.

- "Oh Holy Night" on Excelsis (A Dark Noël) (1995, Projekt Records; various artists compilation)
- Guest vocals on "Resting in My Blood" from Charles East – Dislocated (2024, Brucia Records)
