= Shadow Project =

American deathrock band

- Band shot from Shadow Project's inner sleeve

Background information
- Origin: San Francisco, California, U.S.
- Genres: Deathrock; gothic rock
- Years active: 1987–1993, 1997–1998, 2019
- Labels: Triple X; Hollows Hill Sound; Alice in Wetzlarer
- Past members: Rozz Williams; Eva O; Jill Emery; Thomas Morgan; Paris Sadonis; Peter Tomlinson; Aaron Schwartz; Donato Canzonieri; Chuck Collison; Mark Barone; Christian Omar Madrigal Izzo; Brian Virtue; Michael Ciravolo; William Faith

Shadow Project was a rock band formed in 1987 featuring former members of Los Angeles deathrock groups Christian Death and Super Heroines. After recording two LPs the group experienced a three-year hiatus, reconvening for a third and final album. Shadow Project definitively folded after vocalist Rozz Williams committed suicide on April 1, 1998. The band briefly returned in 2019 under the moniker "Shadow Project 1334" for 13 shows only, vowing to never perform again together after that.

== History ==
=== Formation ===
The band was named after a study of the effects of nuclear bombs in Hiroshima. Centered around Rozz Williams and Eva O, Shadow Project gave its first performance in San Francisco in 1987, but did not maintain much of a profile until Williams and Eva O returned to Los Angeles in 1990. Once there, they recruited keyboardist Paris Sadonis, Super Heroines bassist Jill Emery, and drummer Tom Morgan, formerly from Los Angeles punk band the Flesh Eaters. After touring the city's club circuit – including the legendary Whisky a Go Go – they signed with Triple X Records, responsible for launching Jane's Addiction's successful career.

=== Triple X years ===
The early, scrawled form of Shadow Project's logotype

The band's self-titled first album was released in 1991. AllMusic described Shadow Project's debut as a unique and adventurous "blend of goth, punk and glam", a challenging record that would ultimately prove satisfying after several spins. With Peter Tomlinson replacing Morgan, the group completed a follow-up, Dreams for the Dying, recorded during the 1992 Los Angeles riots. Jill Emery left to concentrate on her Hole duties. After Emery's departure they recruited former Kathedral bassist Donato Canzonieri who finished recording Dreams for the Dying (uncredited). Donato can be seen on the album cover with Eva O. and would also go on to record on Rozz Williams spoken word album Every King A Bastard Son. The following year Shadow Project participated on Triple X's Alice Cooper tribute Welcome to Our Nightmare with a "Dead Babies/Killer" medley. The band personnel for this recording featured yet another line-up change, with Aaron Schwartz now on bass and Chuck Collison handling the track's samples. Shadow Project then toured the United States in the summer, and after that had plans to tour Europe in the Fall, namely France, Germany, the Netherlands, Belgium and the United Kingdom.

During their 1993 tour in support for Dreams for the Dying's release, Shadow Project recorded a concert held in Fullerton, California on June 20, later to be released as the In Tuned Out live album. Alongside tracks culled from their two studio albums, the record features an Alice Cooper medley, a David Bowie cover ("Panic in Detroit") and two unreleased songs. A Christian Death original, "Still Born/Still Life" – dedicated to serial killer Jeffrey Dahmer – was also included in the set.

=== Split ===
After the American tour, Eva O and Paris left the band to focus on Eva O Halo Experience CD Demons Fall for an Angel's Kiss. This effectively ended Shadow Project. For his part, Williams declared that Shadow Project went as far it could. "Eva wanted to go in one direction and I in another", he justified; he then went on to pursue his own musical interests. The German leg of their European tour had already been booked by then, so Rozz Williams went to tour with another band in place, Daucus Karota.

=== Final days ===
After Shadow Project split, Rozz Williams and Eva O. divorced (but remained friendly) and Williams' heroin addiction increased. In 1997 they would once again reunite to record the final Shadow Project release, From the Heart. The album included band material from previous records stripped down to just acoustic guitar and vocal duets. Nathan Van Hala of Christian metal group Saviour Machine was drafted to fill in the keyboard duties. But before From Heart came out Shadow Project's career was again cut short, this time by Rozz Williams' suicide. The singer hanged himself on April Fool's Day, leaving no suicide note. His former Christian Death bandmate, Valor Kand, said that beside suffering from bipolar disorder, Williams battled alcohol and heroin abuse all his life.

== Style and influences ==
In Terrorizer magazine's accessement, Shadow Project "seamlessly blended" all of Rozz Williams' talents: art, music and poetry. In that sense the group had a wide range of influences, raging from glam rock icons David Bowie and T. Rex, West Coast punk bands The Germs and The Alley Cats, to symbolist poet Arthur Rimbaud, "Theatre of Cruelty" creator Antonin Artaud and the cut-up technique of Beat writer William S. Burroughs. Rozz also held pioneer hard rock and heavy metal groups such as Black Sabbath, Led Zeppelin, Kiss and Alice Cooper in great esteem.

Eva O described Shadow Project's music as "a strange mixture of metallic death rock and punk". For his part, Williams stated that Shadow Project's music wasn't "Gothic-Rock"; in fact, the music of Shadow Project was "beyond labeling".

Rozz Williams felt frustrated that he couldn't quite steer from "goth" tag due to the legendary status of his former band, Christian Death. Williams didn't consider himself part of the gothic scene anymore, stating that:

I dont go out to the clubs, so I don't really see it much unless I'm doing a show, and then sometimes it seems a wee bit superficial, you know. It's just funny seeing the whole image and dress and style and everything, which can be really great, but it seems like for a lot of the people, thats their main concern. They dont have many questions behind what they're doing.

== Themes ==
Rozz Williams' favorite subject matter revolved around death, religion and violence. Regarding the latter, the singer was obsessed with serial killers – especially Charles Manson – and dedicated a song ("Still Born/Still Life") to Jeffrey Dahmer. He explained that, to him, "they've crossed a barrier that... well, obviously, you're not supposed to and you're not allowed to, supposedly. It's kind of a fascination with that".

== Discography ==
Studio albums

- Shadow Project (1991)
- Dreams for the Dying (1992)
- From the Heart (1998)

Live albums

- In Tuned Out – Live '93 (1994)

EPs

- The Original Shadow Project (2005)

Demos

- Helter Skelter (1987)

Videos

- And Then There Was Death (2005)

Compilation appearances

- Triple X Records – Compilation Five (1991)
- Welcome to Our Nightmare: A Tribute to Alice Cooper (1993)
- The Fallen Angel – Kyrandia's First Gate (1994)
- Catch 22 (1995)
- Must Be Mental II (1995)
- Hollows Hill (1998)
- Hex Files – The Goth Bible Vol. 3 (1998)
- The Nature of Mother Dance (1998)
- The Black Book Compilation – Goths' Paradise II (1999)
- The Whip (2001)
- Strobelights Vol. 1 (2004)
- Kaliffornian Deathrock (2006)
