= Hell Comes to Your House =

Compilation album by Time Bomb Recordings
- Released: 11 November 1981
- Recorded: Randy Burns - Orange County Recorders
- Genres: Deathrock; punk
- Labels: Bemisbrain; Time Bomb Recordings
- Producers: Steve Sinclair; Ron Goudie

Professional ratings
Review scores
Source	Rating
AllMusic	4/5 stars

Hell Comes to Your House is an American deathrock and punk compilation of Southern California bands. It is notable for releasing the first ever Christian Death song Dogs, as well as including the first studio recordings of Social Distortion and the Super Heroines and one of the earliest performances of Redd Kross.

The album was originally released in 1981 but reissued in 1998.

Engineer Randy Burns went on to produce other punk, thrash and death metal bands including Suicidal Tendencies, Death, Possessed, the Fontanelles, and Megadeth.

The album credits the producer of "Dogs" as Mike Patton. This is not the Ipecac Recordings label head/Faith No More singer, Mike Patton. This Mike Patton was in the band Middle Class and he also produced The Blue Album by the influential Orange County band, Adolescents as well as the Danger Zone EP by China White. He was also the bass player with T.S.O.L.'s Jack Grisham's post TSOL Goth/Dance band, Cathedral of Tears and Trotsky Icepick.

A UK version of Hell Comes to Your House was released by the label Riot State Records in 1982. This version omits Redd Kross's contribution. "Puss 'n' Boots" was replaced by Outer Circle's "Blind Venetians."

== Reception ==
Writing for Louder Than War, Joel Gausten described Hell Comes to Your House as an "absolutely flawless album" that "remains essential listening for adventurous music fans 30 years after its original release". The album was recommended by Billboard magazine, and received a positive review from BAM magazine.

== Track listing ==
1. "Lude Boy" - Social Distortion
2. "Telling Them" - Social Distortion
3. "Daddy's Gone Mad" - Legal Weapon
4. "Puss 'n' Boots" - Redd Kross
5. "Out of My Head" - Modern Warfare
6. "Street Fightin' Man" - Modern Warfare
7. "Deception" - Secret Hate
8. "New Routine/Suicide" - Secret Hate
9. "Suburban Bitch" - The Conservatives
10. "Just Cuz/Nervous" - The Conservatives
11. "Evil" - 45 Grave
12. "Concerned Citizen" - 45 Grave
13. "45 Grave" - 45 Grave
14. "Dogs" - Christian Death
15. "Reject Yourself" - 100 Flowers
16. "Marry It" - Rhino 39
17. "Death on the Elevator" - Super Heroines
18. "Embalmed Love" - Super Heroines

== See also ==
- List of punk rock compilation albums
