= Bitter Ruin =

English "experimental pop" duo

- Origin: Brighton, East Sussex, England
- Genres: Alternative, Folk, Pop
- Years active: 2007—present
- Members: Ben Richards; Georgia Train
- Website: bitterruin.bandcamp.com

Bitter Ruin are an English "experimental pop" duo from Brighton, UK, formed in 2007 by Georgia Train (lead vocals, backing vocals, piano) and Ben Richards (lead vocals, backing vocals, guitar, piano, bass).

== Biography ==
Richards and Train met in 2007 as music students at Brighton Institute of Modern Music, and performed, mostly in Brighton and London, and recorded a few EPs. In 2010 they played a short tour supporting Evelyn Evelyn. Matt Lucas helped manage the band, as well as performing with the band at several of their shows.

The band's 2011 single, "Trust", was placed at no 19 in the UK Independent Singles Breakers Chart on Sunday 16 October.

In October 2012 the band recorded The Rocket Sessions EP at Rocket Studios in London. The band raised £33,000 in 2013 on Kickstarter to build a home studio for the recording of their second album Waves. They were invited by Kickstarter to talk about their experience at an industry conference at Somerset House, London on 22 October 2013. The band supported Ben Folds Five on their European reunion tour in December.

The band released another single in January 2014, "Diggers". It was reviewed by Q, Clash and the French Les InRocks, and was played on BBC Introducing and from the independent station Xfm.

On 12 February 2019, the band announced the release of a new single, "Caution to the Wind", their first new music together in 5 years.

In September of 2024 they announced a brand new album set to release in 2025. In the following months they released two new singles from the upcoming album and revealed the album's art, name, and date. Bitter Ruin's 3rd studio album "Arches & Enemies" is set to release on May 15, 2025.

== Discography ==
Singles

- "Trust" (2011)
- "Diggers" (2013)
- "Caution to the Wind" (2019)
- "Rubble" (2020)
- "Blood Blue" (2020)
- "Brother" (2021)
- "Criticise" (2024)
- "Through the Bricks" (2025)

EPs

- Bitter Ruin (2007)
- We're Not Dancing (2008)
- The Rocket Sessions (2012)

Albums

- Hung, Drawn & Quartered (2010)
- Waves (2014)
- Arches & Enemies (2025)
