= Rozz Williams =

American singer (1963–1998)

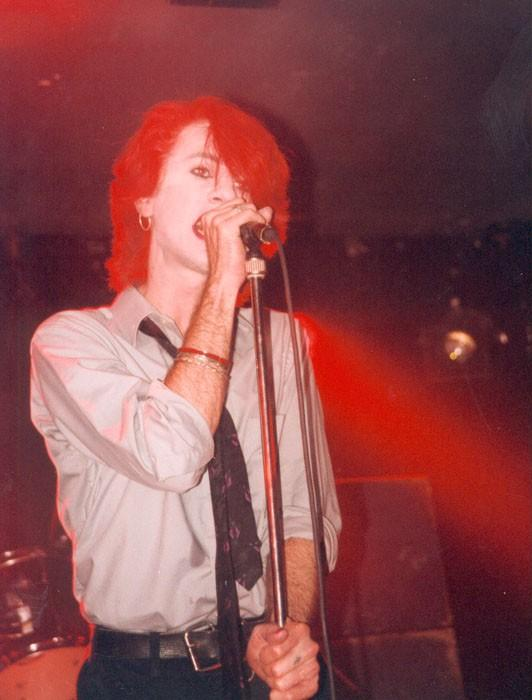
- Rozz Williams performing live with Daucus Karota

Background information
- Also known as: Rozz Williams
- Born: Roger Alan Painter; November 6, 1963; Pomona, California, U.S.
- Died: April 1, 1998 (aged 34) West Hollywood, California, U.S.
- Genres: Deathrock; gothic rock; post-punk; industrial; industrial rock; punk rock; dark ambient; dark cabaret; experimental
- Occupations: Singer; collage artist; songwriter; poet; filmmaker
- Instrument: Vocals
- Years active: 1978–1998
- Labels: Cleopatra; Frontier; Triple X; Hollows Hill Sound
- Formerly of: Christian Death; Shadow Project; Premature Ejaculation; Daucus Karota; Heltir; EXP; Gitane Demone
- Spouse: Eva O (1987-1998)

Rozz Williams (born Roger Alan Painter; November 6, 1963 – April 1, 1998) was an American singer and songwriter known for his work with the bands Christian Death, Shadow Project (with musician Eva O), and the industrial project Premature Ejaculation. Christian Death is cited by some as a pioneer of the American gothic rock scene as well as deathrock, and is considered to be one of the most influential figures of the scene. However, Williams disliked the "goth" label and actively worked to shed it during the 1980s and 1990s by focusing on punk rock, hard rock, cabaret, and spoken word music. Williams was also involved with his groups Daucus Karota, Heltir, EXP, Bloodflag, and his own version of Christian Death (Christian Death featuring Rozz Williams), along with recording a handful of solo albums. In addition to music, Williams was also an avid painter, poet, and collage artist.

After battling a long lasting heroin addiction and bi-polar disorder, Williams died by suicide on April 1, 1998, at 34 years old.

== Early life ==
Rozz Williams was born Roger Alan Painter on November 6, 1963, in Pomona, California, and was raised in a strict Southern Baptist family. His father Robert Norman Painter was an artist. Rozz had three older siblings (Janet, Bobby, and Larry). After being expelled from his high school in Pomona for lack of attendance, he transferred to Claremont High School, where he was again expelled in ninth grade.

As a child, he was a fan of David Bowie, Lou Reed, Roxy Music, T. Rex, Alice Cooper, Iggy Pop and the New York Dolls.

== Career ==
=== Early bands ===
At the age of fifteen, Painter formed his first band the A-Sexuals. In an interview with Nico B, Jill Emery stated of the A-Sexuals: "I thought it was funny because considering we were kind of coming out of the closet to a degree and we were, and in my mind later in life, like even last year, why can't the asexuals – and I don't mean the band; I mean in general — be in the gay parade too? Why can't they be in the back of it? Like, they are people too, and they have their preference, but it's just funny. We were just kids. We weren't that straight edge". In addition to being the lead vocalist, he played the organ and guitar, with Jill Emery also contributing vocals as well as playing bass, and Steve Darrow on drums. The A-Sexuals disbanded after a few months, with Emery and Darrow morphing the band into the Decadents at the end of 1978.

Following this, Painter became friends with John "Jay" Albert, with whom he would attempt to form several bands with under names including No and the Crawlers. These groups never performed live and most rarely even rehearsed. In Mikey Bean's book Phantoms, Albert called them "nonexistent band[s]". Around this time, Painter began an intimate relationship with Darby Crash, vocalist of the Germs, under whose influence he decided to take a stage name. There exists an urban myth that the name "Rozz Williams" was derived from a gravestone in Pemona, however in Phantoms, Albert, Darrow and George Belanger claim that this is untrue, with Belanger stating that the first name came as a suggestion from their friend Ann Miller.

=== Christian Death ===
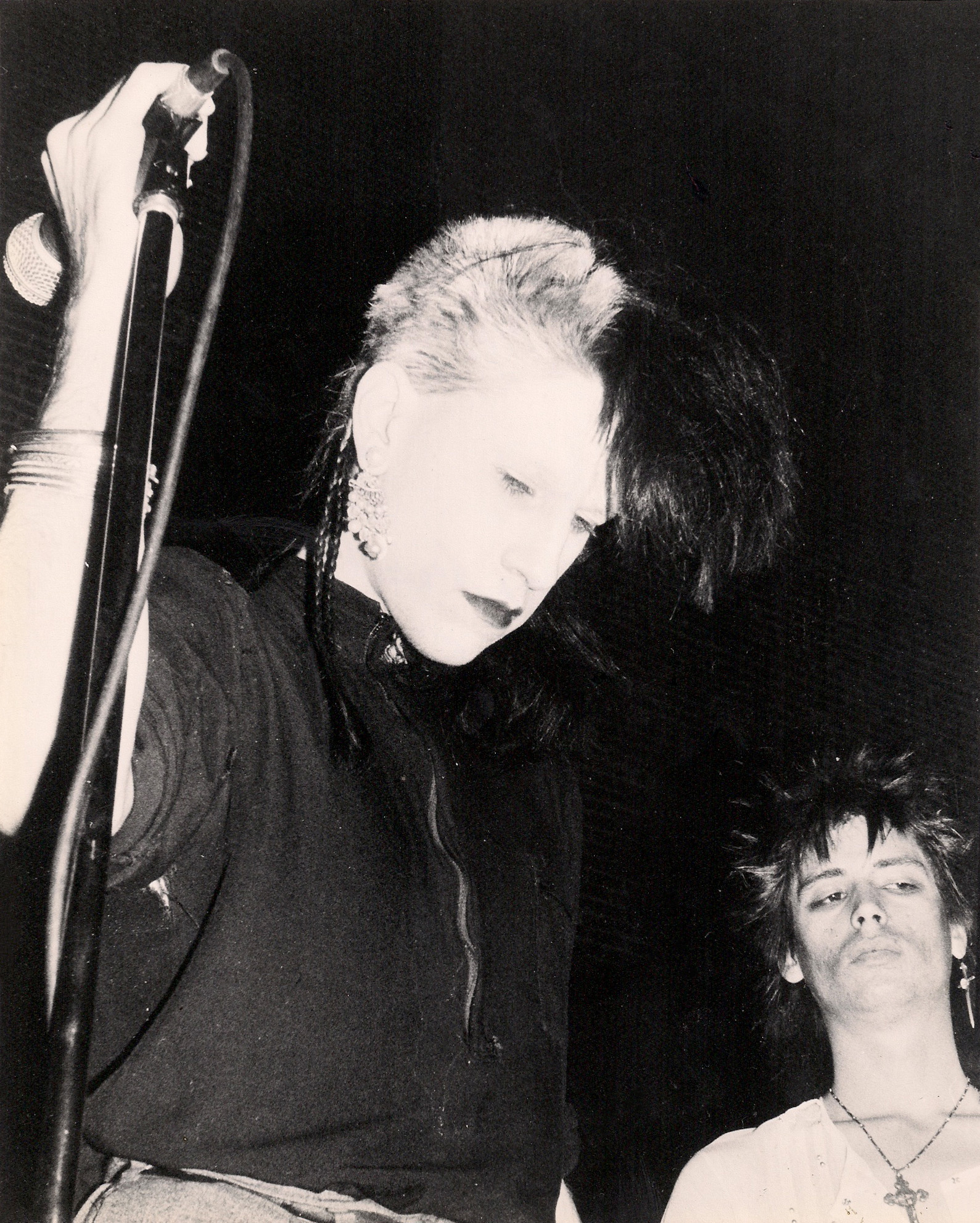
Williams (front) and Johnnie Sage performing with Christian Death in 1983

Albert and Williams formed Christian Death in October 1979 alongside bassist James McGearty and drummer George Belanger. At this time, the band was a punk rock band musically indebted to the Germs. As the band progressed their music slowed and began to incorporate religious symbolism. Their first live performance was an impromptu set at the Hong Kong Cafe in Los Angeles supporting Castration Squad, replacing Killer Pussy after they were booed off stage.

After a physical altercation involving Belanger took place, he was left unable to play drums for their upcoming at on February 14, 1981. Williams asked Steve Darrow to fill in, however Belanger decided moments before their set to still try and play, leading to Belanger performing the first few songs then Darrow finishing the set. This incident angered Albert, who left the band permanently mid-set. Subsequently, Christian Death was halted, with Albert and Williams forming noise band Daucus Karota with drummer Mary Torcivia. Williams, McGearty and Belanger regrouped a few months later, now accompanied by guitarist Rikk Agnew, who had just left the Adolescents. With this lineup, they made their first vinyl appearance with the song "Dogs" on the 1981 L.A. scene compilation album Hell Comes to Your House. The following year, they signed with Frontier Records and released their debut studio album, Only Theatre of Pain, on March 24.

The following year Belanger left the band after becoming disheartened by the growing darkness of the band's image and increasing drug abuse. Belanger's role was filled by Rod "China" Figueroa, whose first performance with the band was a record signing on April 10, 1982. Later that year, while the band were getting ready for a domestic tour, Agnew, distressed by his own drug use and troubles in his relationship, began to experience panicked episodes where he would imagine Williams and his boyfriend Ron Athey being subject to homophobic attacks in Southern states and the band being arrested for drug possession. This culminated in him leaving the band as they were preparing to go on stage. The band then hired Mikaleno Amundson to play guitar, who moved in with Figueroa. However, when Amundson and Figueroas' girlfriends fell out with each other, Amundson was forced to move out and leave the band after "about three to five shows." Because of this, Eva O briefly became the band's guitarist. On October 30, 1982, this lineup opened for Angelic Upstarts at SIR Studios alongside Pompeii 99. Following this, Michael Montano and Johnnie Sage both began playing guitar in the band, and they played again with Pompeii 99. By the end of the year, McGearty had left the band. With Williams as the only founding member remaining, Christian Death disbanded.

Around this point, Pompeii 99 too were going through a number of lineup changes. Subsequently, six months after Christian Death's disbandment, Williams joined Pompeii 99, which at that time consisted of only guitarist and vocalist Valor Kand and drummer David "Glass" Parkinson. Under Williams' suggestion, the band's session keyboard player and Kand's partner Gitane DeMone officially joined the band. After Williams was approached by Yann Farcy of French record label L'Invitation au Suicide to record another Christian Death album and tour Europe, the band hired bassist Constance Smith (later Redgrave) and changed their name to Christian Death. This culminated in Christian Death's second studio album Catastrophe Ballet (1984). Recorded at Rockfield studios in Monmouth, Wales, much of this album's instrumentals were written by Kand, with Williams contributing entirely to lyrics and partially to melody writing. It was a departure the band's angry punk influenced style and was dedicated to surrealist André Breton. While in France, Smith departed from the group due to a mental health struggle, being replaced by Dave Roberts of Sex Gang Children.

In autumn 1984 the band returned to America and recorded Ashes, which was released the following year. In mid-1985, Williams departed from the group, frustrated by Kand's increasing control of the band and perceived disregard for how touring affected the members' ventures outside of music. He originally planned to do this under the pretext that DeMone would also be leaving, however she soon decided not to, as that would also mean separating Kand from their child together. Following Williams' departure, the remaining members made an effort to change the band's name to Sin and Sacrifice, transitioning to that name through booking their next tour as the Sin and Sacrifice of Christian Death. However, the promoters did not adhere to this change, instead having them booked as simply Christian Death. This issue then became exacerbated once they were offered a record deal which they could only accept if they continued on as Christian Death.

Williams recorded for Cleopatra Records in 1992. Williams had been the only original member of Christian Death left when he departed the group in 1985, yet the remaining members continued to perform earlier Christian Death material and released several albums under the original group name.

Williams had already recorded two more songs, "Haloes" and "Spectre (Love Is Dead)", with Eric Westfall, but these were not officially released for five years. The songs appeared on the Heavens and Hells cassettes, which also included live performances Williams selected from his own tapes. A third, unfinished song from the session with Eric Westfall was called "This Mirage". This was only completed many years after, with assistance from Erik Christides, and released for the first time in 1998.

=== Premature Ejaculation, Shadow Project and Christian Death featuring Rozz Williams ===
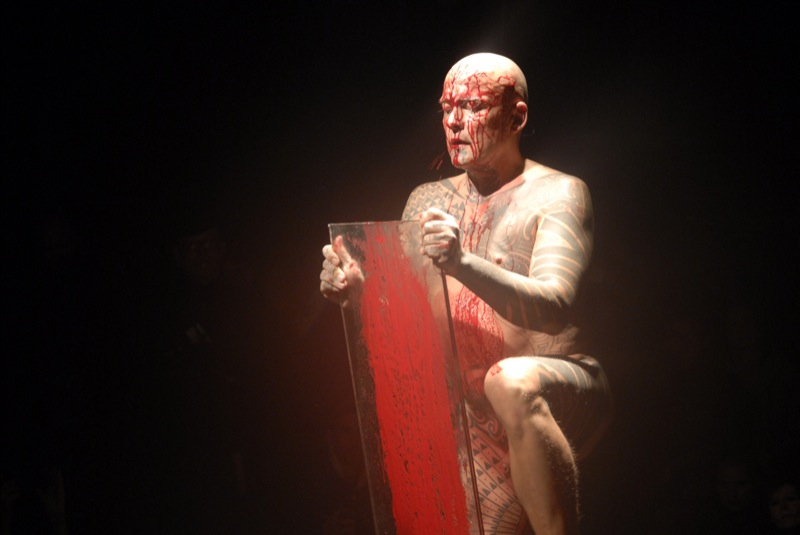
Ron Athey, with whom Williams formed Premature Ejaculation in 1981

Williams formed Premature Ejaculation in 1981 with performance artist Ron Athey. After only a few live performances, including one which involved Athey eating a crucified road-kill cat, clubs began refusing to book them.

Williams formed Shadow Project with Eva O in 1987. The band lineup included Johann Schumann (bass) and also Barry Galvin and David Glass, both of whom also recorded with post Ashes-era Christian Death. The name "Shadow Project" was taken from the tests in Hiroshima following the nuclear bomb which left impressions or "shadows", but no bodies.

Later on, Williams reformed Shadow Project with Eva O, Jill Emery (bass), Tom Morgan (drums) and Paris Sadonis (keyboards). At the time, Rozz was increasingly falling under the influence of the philosophy of Charles Manson. Jill Emery left the band early in 1992 to concentrate her duties on Hole, who would become an internationally successful act, and Aaron Schwartz was brought in to record "Dead Babies/Killer" for the Welcome to Our Nightmare compilation CD consisting of cover versions of Alice Cooper songs. Chuck Collison also contributed samples to these tracks.

Williams, Eva, Listo (bass) and David Melford (drums) started recording new versions of Christian Death songs for The Iron Mask album in February 1992. The album was made, in part, to finance the Shadow Project European tour of February and March 1992, when they were supported by Mephisto Walz. Peter Tomlinson had replaced Tom Morgan on drums for this tour.

Williams also occasionally took part in Christian Death reunions during the late 1980s and early 1990s with Rikk Agnew, the guitarist on the band's first album.

In 1992, with the help of Eva O, Paris Sadonis, William Faith, Sevan Kand (son of Valor Kand), Scat Elis, Stevyn Grey, Kris Kohls, Brian Virtue, Wayne James, Armon Christoff and Aaron Schwartz, Rozz Williams recorded two new Christian Death studio albums entitled The Path of Sorrows and The Rage of Angels. Williams had been quoted as saying "The Path of Sorrows is probably my favorite Christian Death album".

For the last time in June 1993 at Los Angeles' Patriotic Hall, Christian Death regrouped for a one show, captured on the CD and live video Iconologia. Williams was joined by Rikk Agnew, George Belanger and Casey (bass). Following his brother's decision not to come back on stage to play the encores, Frank Agnew was credited as additional guitarist on the recordings. During some live performances, Williams could be seen wearing a T-shirt which sported the words "Never Trust a Valor".

At this time, there were effectively two bands recording and performing material under the name "Christian Death". This eventually precipitated a heated legal battle between Williams and Valor Kand which was never satisfactorily resolved.

In 1993, Shadow Project toured America. The band consisted of Williams, Eva, Paris Sadonis, Mark Barone (bass) and Christian Omar Madrigal Izzo (drums). After this American tour, Eva O and Paris left the band to work on the Eva O Halo Experience CD Demons Fall for an Angel's Kiss. Shadow Project had come to an end; however, a German tour for October had already been booked. Although all tickets, flyers and publicity for this tour were credited to Shadow Project, Williams had decided that the band name should change to Daucus Karota. He sang on the tour, Brian Butler was the guitarist, Mark Barone played bass and Christian Omar Madrigal Izzo was on drums. For one show, Demone drove from her home in Amsterdam to Germany to meet up with Williams backstage. The Shrine EP by Daucus Karota was recorded in January 1994 with Mark Barone (bass), Christian Omar Madrigal Izzo (drums) and Roxy (guitars). The EP was reviewed favourably by Trouser Press. Daucus Karota returned to Europe for a month-long European tour in November 1994, with Demone filling the support slot. The tour had Todd Dixon on drums, Michael Saavedra on bass and Brian Hansen on guitar. Hansen had replaced Rolf Donath, who had been the guitarist for the band at shows in Los Angeles and Mexico during that summer.

=== Later career ===
Demone and Williams came together to release the album Dream Home Heartache in 1995. It was recorded by Williams and Demone in Gent, Belgium between March 28 and April 5, 1995, with help from Pieter Rekfelt. The producer was Ken Thomas who had previously worked with David Bowie on Hunky Dory. Williams and Gitane played a few shows together in April 1995 and again in December 1995. They toured the UK in April 1996.

In 1995, following his return from Europe, Williams joined up with Paris Sadonis and Ryan Wildstar to work on the spoken word album, The Whorse's Mouth. The lyrics, co-written with Ryan Wildstar, chronicle a period of heroin addiction from which the two eventually escaped. Shortly following the recording of The Whorse's Mouth, Williams began playing bass for EXP, the musical troupe created by Paris and Ryan Wildstar. He went on to play bass on their self-titled debut album with bandmates Paris (keyboards), Ryan Wildstar (vocals), Doriandra (vocals), Ace Farren Ford (horns/violin), Justin Bennett (drums) and Ignacio Segovia (percussion).

In 1997, Williams again paired up with Eva O to record the final Shadow Project album, From the Heart. He also recorded Wound of Exit, his last solo CD as Premature Ejaculation.

=== Other interests ===
In addition to his musical activities, Williams had a keen interest in painting, along with collaging, and several of his pieces have been exhibited at some dark art shows through Los Angeles and Atlanta through his friend Snow Elizabeth. He also co-directed and scored Pig, a 1998 experimental psychological horror silent short film with underground film maker Nico B. The film stars Rozz Williams and James Hollan and was produced and directed by Nico B. Pig was the last work Williams did.

== Personal life ==
Williams did not like to discuss his sexual orientation publicly, however in a 1997 interview with John Sabien Ellenberger for Golgotha Magazine, he called himself gay. In the same interview with Ellenberger, while discussing The Whorse's Mouth he revealed how he was hesitant to have his family listen to the album, Williams stated, "There's certain things I don't feel like need to be shared with them. It was a really difficult thing for me to call, and just say like 'well guess what? I'm gay'. You know, my mom's response was 'Well son, I'm not stupid.'" In the 1980s, he was in a long-term relationship with performance artist Ron Athey, and together they would both enter an intimate relationship with Eva O. After Athey and Williams split, Williams would continue his relationship with Eva O, whom he married in 1987, and then divorced in 1998.

Williams regularly performed in drag, a trait that put him at an inverse to the prevailing hypermasculinity of the hardcore punk scene he was involved in. He began doing this as an act of rebellion against the jock types who became involved in punk. Music archivist Danny Fuentes compared his style of performance to political activism, stating: "The gender bending of his persona and the in-your-face delivery made it a form of queer activism... that is what was brave about him, he never felt the need to explain himself." However, as time passed it became intrinsically linked to his identity; he began to explore the practice of "living in drag", where for stretches of time he would only ever be seen in women's clothes, an aspect that lessened later in life. Musician Anohni cited this aspect of Williams as influential upon both her understanding of her own identity and the style of performance in her group Blacklips, saying in an interview with Artforum that she "think[s] of Rozz more and more as such a foundational presence in a certain line of underground queer dreaming. Rozz... definitely had a huge impact on me and Johanna, as did Diamanda Galás." Andrew D'Angelo too cited Williams as influential upon his understanding of gender and sexuality.

Williams was raised in a strict Southern Baptist family, but abandoned this as he formed Christian Death. As the years went on, as he stated in an interview with Ellenberger, he eventually became a Satanist and practiced magic in the privacy of his home. However, in 1996, he stated in another interview with Ellenberger that he had developed a "personal relationship with God."

And What About the Bells?, a collection of Williams' poetry compiled and edited by Ryan Wildstar, was released posthumously in 2010. An updated, hardcover edition, featuring scans of Williams' journals, a new foreword, and an in-depth interview with Ryan Wildstar was released on June 9, 2023.

== Suicide ==
In the introduction for the book And What About the Bells?, Ryan Wildstar (born Ryan Gaumer), Williams' friend and roommate of eight years, stated that on March 31, the night before Williams took his own life, they watched the film Isadora (1968), about dancer Isadora Duncan, during which Wildstar retired to bed despite Williams' protest, who said, "You don't even know how it ends!" Wildstar replied that he knew Isadora hangs to death at the end after her scarf gets caught on the spokes of her car's wheel, and went to bed. Williams made final phone calls to friends and family in the early morning hours the next day. Wildstar said that if he had not been distraught over the death of his boyfriend Erik Christides, who died of a heroin overdose on November 27, 1997 (Thanksgiving Day), he would have seen the warning signs to Williams' suicide more clearly.

On April 1, 1998, Williams hanged himself in his West Hollywood apartment, at the age of 34. His body was discovered by Wildstar, who heard worried messages on the answering machine and broke down the door to Williams' bedroom when he returned home that afternoon. Williams had left a rose on the coffee table in the living room, along with several items, including The Hanged Man tarot card. He left no note. A memorial was held at the El Rey Theatre shortly after his death, and a small gathering of family and friends scattered his ashes at Runyon Canyon Park in the Hollywood Hills.

Theories have arisen regarding the reason for Williams's suicide, including failing health, depression, bipolar disorder, financial instability, and his fascination with the number 1334, which can be found in the liner notes of his albums, in his signature, and also on his urn. It is also unknown why Williams chose April Fools' Day as the date of his death.

The cabinet in which he hanged himself as well as a few pieces of original artwork are on display at the L.A. Museum of Death.

== Legacy ==
Williams' creativity had a profound effect on the Goth subculture and was also influential in poetry and collage artwork. Annually, fans pay tribute to his life and work. In 2010, Gothic Beauty Magazine and a short film Necessary Discomforts an Artistic Tribute to Rozz Williams featured one such event at the Hyaena Gallery.

The Mountain Goats' 2000 album, The Coroner's Gambit, was dedicated to Williams, and several songs refer to singer John Darnielle's reaction to Williams' death.

On April 1, 2018, to commemorate twenty years since Williams's death, Cult Epics and Dark Vinyl Records released two albums: In the Heart, recorded during the "Dream Home Heartache Tour", and On the Altar, from Williams's last European tour.

In 2018, Cult Epics released a box set to commemorate the 20th anniversary of his film Pig, which starred Williams. Only twenty-five were made. Each included one of the few remaining VHS copies of the film (numbered up to 1334), an exclusive t-shirt, a postcard, lobby cards, a limited edition print of one of Williams' collages, a commemorative pin, and a portion of the original 8 mm film strip. Each box was signed and dated by Nico B., and each VHS tape was signed as well.

Cult Epics had released also the book "The Art of Rozz Williams: From Christian Death to Death" in a Hardcover re-issue in 2018 as well "Christian Death: OTOP Photography by Edward Colver", in Hardcover and Softcover editions in 2022.

== Discography ==
=== Christian Death (1981–1985) ===
- Deathwish (EP; recorded 1981/released 1984)
- Only Theatre of Pain (1982)
- Catastrophe Ballet (1984)
- Ashes (1985)
- The Decomposition of Violets (live; 1985)
- The Doll's Theatre: Live Oct. 31. 1981 (live; 1994)

=== Christian Death featuring Rozz Williams (1989–1993) ===
- The Iron Mask (1992)
- Skeleton Kiss EP (1992)
- Stick a Finger Down Its Throat (1992)
- The Path of Sorrows (1993)
- Iconologia (1993)
- Sleepless Nights: Live 1990 (1993)
- Invocations: 1981–1989 (1993)
- The Rage of Angels (1994)
- Tales of Innocence: A Continued Anthology (1994)
- Christian Death: Live (video; 1995)
- Death in Detroit (1995)
- Death Mix (1996)
- The Best of Christian Death (Featuring: Rozz Williams) (1999)
- Death Club (2005)
- Six Six Sixth Communion (2007)
- Death Box (box set; 2012)

=== Shadow Project (1987–1998) ===
- Is Truth a Crime? (1989)
- Shadow Project (1991)
- Dreams for the Dying (1992)
- Dead Babies/Killer (1992)
- In Tuned Out – Live '93 (1994)
- From the Heart (1998)
- The Original Shadow Project (2005)

=== Premature Ejaculation (1981–1998) ===
- PE – Pt.1 (1981)
- PE – Pt.2 (1981)
- A Little Hard to Swallow (1982)
- Living Monstrocities/Descent (1985)
- Death Cultures (1987)
- Assertive Discipline (1988)
- Death Cultures III (1988)
- Blood Told in Spine (1991)
- Death Cultures (1989)
- Anesthesia (1992)
- Necessary Discomforts (1993)
- Estimating the Time of Death (1994)
- Wound of Exit (1998)

=== Happiest Place on Earth (1986–1990) ===
- Body of a Crow (1986)
- PULSE (1989)
- Environments: Birth, Death, Decay (1990)

=== Daucus Karota (1979, 1986, 1993–1994) ===
- Shrine EP (1994)

=== Heltir (1987–1998) ===
- Il banchetto dei cancri/VC-706 (1989)
- 69 Rituals (1989)
- Neue sachlichkeit (1994)

=== EXP (1991–1996) ===
- EXP (1996)

=== Rozz Williams (solo and duo works—1992–1998) ===
- Every King a Bastard Son (1992)
- Dream Home Heartache (1995) (with Gitane DeMone)
- The Whorse's Mouth (1996)

=== Posthumous albums ===
- Pig Original Soundtrack (1999)
- Untitled (1999; available with "The Art of Rozz Williams")
- Live in Berlin (2000)
- Accept the Gift of Sin (2003)
- Sleeping Dogs (2013)
- In the Heart (2018)
- On the Altar (2018)

== Filmography ==
- Is Truth a Crime??? (1989)
- Pig (1998)
- 1334 (2012; posthumous)

== Bibliography ==
- The Art of Rozz Williams: From Christian Death To Death (Softcover 1999) (Hardcover 2016, 2021)
- Le théâtre des douleurs... and What About The Bells? (2010)
- Christian Death - Only Theatre of Pain: Photography by Edward Colver (2022)
