= Paris Sadonis =

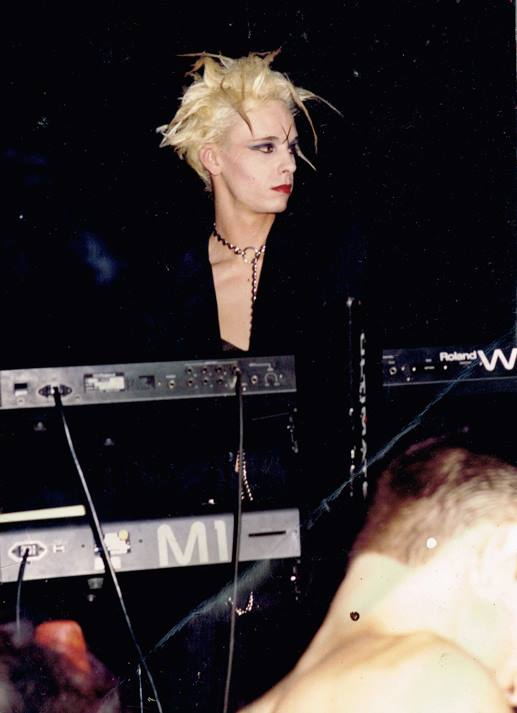
- Paris with Shadow Project

Background information
- Born: Paris Anthony Sadonis; May 6, 1972 (age 54); Los Angeles, California, United States

Paris Anthony Sadonis (born May 6, 1972) is a Los Angeles-based keyboardist, painter, performance artist and musician.

== History ==
Best known for his work alongside Rozz Williams, Eva Ortiz and Jill Emery with deathrock band Shadow Project. He is featured on the 1991 self-titled "Shadow Project", "Dreams for the Dying", "Dead Babies/Killer" single, as well as the live "In Tuned Out - Live '93" released in 1994.

A multi-instrumentalist, he performed and recorded with Christian Death on "The Path Of Sorrows" (1993) and "The Rage Of Angels" (1994) as well as Rozz Williams' solo material "Every King a Bastard Son" (1992) and "The Whorse's Mouth" (1996).

With The Eva O Halo Experience - "Demons Fall For an Angels Kiss" (1994) he composed using a variety of instruments including keyboards, piano and organ.

Paris went on to found the experimental band EXP in 1992 with Ryan Wildstar, Doriandra Smith, Rozz Williams and Ace Farren Ford. EXP is one of the most interconnected projects within the Family collective, featuring Rozz Williams and a broad range of members, former members, collaborators, and guest musicians. The project released one self-titled full-length album, as well as a limited-edition, handmade 7-inch single..

Also collaborating with Premature Ejaculation and elaborating upon boundary-pushing performance art, he is featured on the album "Wound of Exit" (1998), The group's themes remained avant-garde throughout this time, focusing on the bizarre and taboo. Paris also contributed to Erik Christides Bloodflag - Stain (Mk I) (1998 - Daughters of Darkness).

He toured with Gitane Demone following his work with Penal Colony's "5 Man Job" Tour alongside EXP collaborator Justin Bennett, who around that time started to get into a lot of experimental noise, branching out from EXP to put out an all ambient noise album with Paris under the name "Face" (A Picture Of End - 1997). Eventually the concept behind Face evolved into the ambient project "The Implicate Order" (Volume One: Enfolded 2002).

Involution is an experimental electronic group made up of CEvin Key (Skinny Puppy) and Paris Sadonis (Christian Death/Shadow Project). They released one self-titled album on Tone Casualties Records in 1998.

From the inside cover of the CD: “We come from the center and circumference of everything, radiating, drawing forth the Divine Influx. Together through our cosmic conceptions, we sublimate Omnipresence for all existing in and out this mirror of matter; who trusts and believes. ‘Cause when our brainclouds glisten - and our eyes glide aside - our frequencies mesh - and through our vibes, all consciousize. It is done unto you as you believe. What it does for us - it must do through us. Trust the invisible - for it is the sole cause of which is visible. Nothing moves but mind.”

—

Gravehill Paris Witch was a side project featuring Jyrki and Marko from Two Witches and Paris (EXP, Rozz William's Christian Death). Musically, leaning towards Cold Meat Industry reminiscent urban dark ambient soundscapes. "Arte Astratta" was released in limited edition in Finland (2006).

Foxfairy is a live electronic project formed by Paris Sadonis and Justin Rickles in Los Angeles during 2011. Amir Derakh's Circuit Freq Records released a self-titled EP (2011) as well as a full-length LP - Zero (2013) It has been called "Downtempo From the LA Underground, Massive Attack with a chiptune influence, The soundtrack to the cyberspace afterparty."
