= Dark cabaret =

Genre of cabaret influenced by goth and punk

- Other names: Punk cabaret
- Stylistic origins: Cabaret; burlesque; vaudeville; jazz; swing; circus; music hall
- Cultural origins: 1970s–1990s, Western and Central Europe

Other topics
- Artists; steampunk; gothic rock; deathrock

Dark cabaret is a music genre that draws on the aesthetics of burlesque, vaudeville and Weimar-era cabaret, generally played by groups with origins in rock music.

The genre traces its roots to 1930s Weimar Republic experimental cabaret of Bertolt Brecht and Kurt Weill, and their influence upon 1960s rock bands including the Doors. In the 1970s, the dark cabaret genre began to emerge with Steve Harley & Cockney Rebel's The Human Menagerie (1973) and Nico's The End... (1974). During the 1980s, the genre was adopted by groups with origins in post-punk, new wave and gothic rock, including Marc Almond, the Virgin Prunes, Nina Hagen and Sex Gang Children. These disparate forms of the genre were largely codified during the 1990s, through the works of the Tiger Lillies, as well as Rozz Williams and Gitane Demone's Dream Home Heartache (1995). During this decade, the neo-burlesque movement began, which allowed acts in the 2000s such as the Dresden Dolls, the World/Inferno Friendship Society, Jill Tracy and Katzenjammer Kabarett to gain mainstream attention. Amidst this period, the genre's influence from embraced by some prominent groups in the indie rock and emo pop genres.

== History ==
=== Precursors ===
In a 2019 article for The New York Times writer Christopher R. Weingarten stated that "Any journey into cabaret-punk begins with the work of Bertold Brecht and Kurt Weill". The pair's work merged Weimar-era cabaret with elements of the country's pop music, American jazz music and socialist themes. Weingarten specifically cited the "Alabama Song" (1930), as performed by Lotte Lenya, as a notable precursor, as well as its 1967 cover by rock band the Doors. Furthermore, the 1972 film Cabaret's dark and cynical take on cabaret performance anticipated dark cabaret.

=== Origins (1970s–1990s) ===
In his book The Music Sound, academic Nicolae Sfetcu traced the origins of dark cabaret to German musician Nico's 1974 album The End... and its songs "You Forgot to Answer" and "Secret Side". Dave Thompson's review for AllMusic also cited Steve Harley & Cockney Rebel's 1973 album The Human Menagerie as dark cabaret. and The Psychomodo. In the following years, this style was also adopted by Marc Almond, the Virgin Prunes and Nina Hagen. Sex Gang Children, too, incorporated elements of cabaret into their macabre, early 1980s gothic rock sound.

One of the earliest bands to play mainly or exclusively in a style which might now be described as dark cabaret were the Tiger Lillies, formed in London in 1989. In the 1980s satirical cabaret had been revived and popularised by London-based bands such as Fascinating Aïda and Kit and The Widow but the Tiger Lillies incorporated themes of blasphemy, prostitution and bestiality in their songs, sung by Martyn Jacques in a menacing style with a falsetto voice. A collaboration between Rozz Williams and Gitane Demone – both former members of Christian Death, entitled Dream Home Heartache (1995) – was described by reviewers as "cabaret noir" or "glam cabaret".

=== Mainstream success (2000s) ===
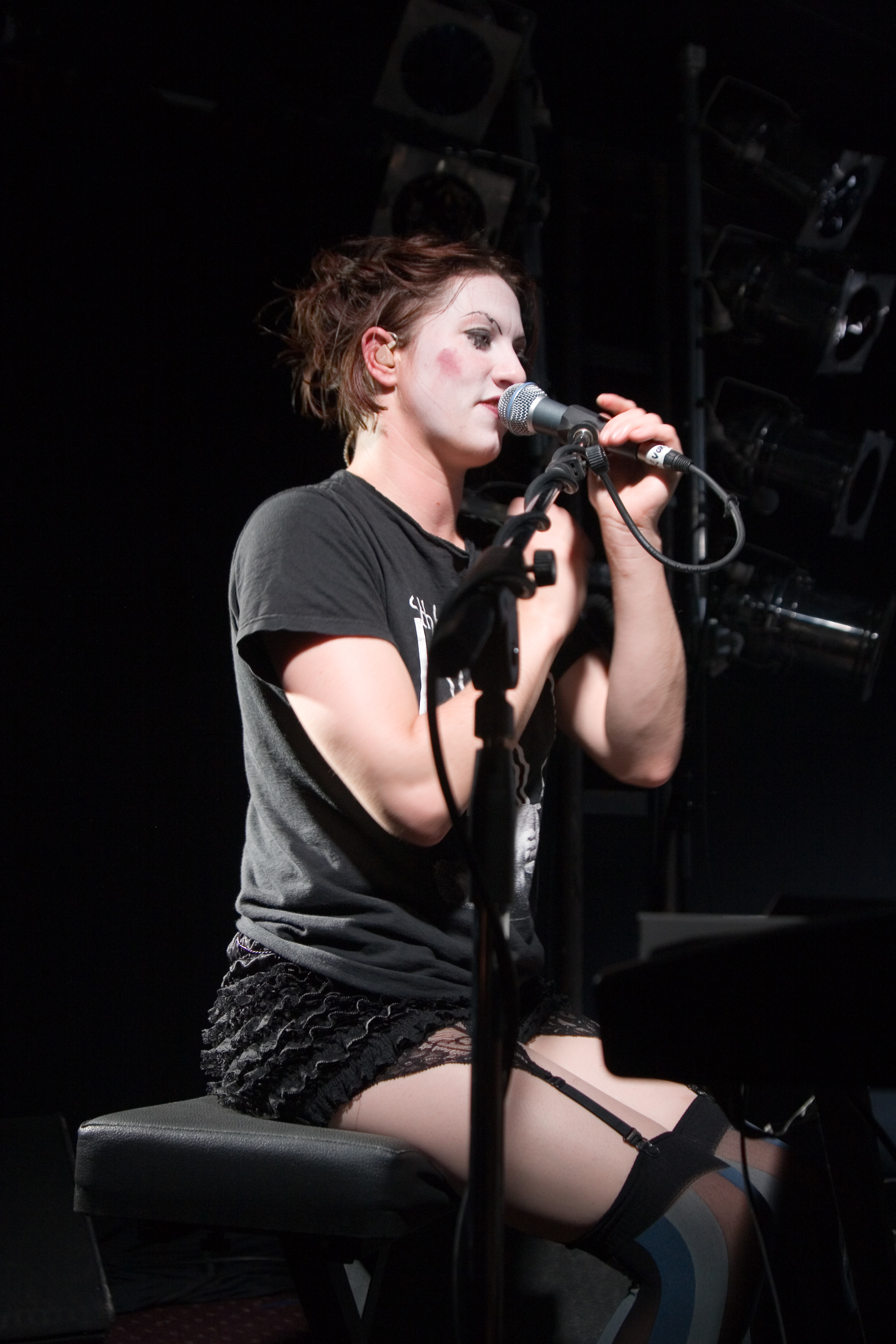
The Dresden Dolls' Amanda Palmer

The late 1990s saw the rise of Neo-Burlesque, which revived interest in cabaret, appearance of performers such as the Chicago burlesque orchestra Apartment (1997–2005) and the emergence of gothic bellydance. Collaboration with burlesque performers was given by Brian Viglione as the inspiration for the Dresden Dolls' look. By the 2000s, burlesque was receiving a revived mainstream interest, with the films Moulin Rouge! (2001), Big Fish (2003) and A Series Of Unfortunate Events gaining significant attention, the high profile public persona of burlesque dancer Dita Von Teese and the medium being incorporated into music videos released by musical artists including Big Brovaz, the Killers and Modest Mouse.

Dark cabaret as a distinct musical movement began to solidify around the mid-2000s, notably represented by Projekt Records's 2005 compilation album Projekt Presents: A Dark Cabaret, which largely popularised the genre. The album included "Flowers" from Dream Home Heartache sung by Rozz Williams together with, among others, "Evil Night Together" by Jill Tracy, "Sometimes, Sunshine" by Revue Noir, and "Coin-Operated Boy" by the Dresden Dolls. Formed by Amanda Palmer and Brian Viglione in 2000, The Dresden Dolls described their music as "Brechtian punk cabaret", a term coined by Amanda Palmer in early 2003 in part to preclude being labelled by the media as goths. Nevertheless, with their musical style and appearance in white face makeup and reduced period clothing, the Dresden Dolls and their fans quickly became the most readily identified with the newly evident dark cabaret genre, garnering the most mainstream attention. The band's popularity led to an increased interest in prior acts in the genre namely the Tiger Lillies and the World/Inferno Friendship Society, and bands began categorising themselves and their performance as dark cabaret, such as Katzenjammer Kabarett in France, or Ray Childish in Austria. At this time, elements of dark cabaret also began to be embraced by practitioners of emo pop music, including My Chemical Romance and Panic! at the Disco.

== Record labels ==
- Projekt Records
- No Comment Records
- The End Records

== See also ==
- List of dark cabaret artists
