= Christian Death discography =

Discography of Christian Death, all three versions: 1) originally fronted by Rozz Williams, 2) fronted by Valor Kand, 3) parallel version formed by Rozz Williams in the late 1980s.

== Fronted by Rozz Williams ==
=== Albums ===
- Only Theatre of Pain (1982)
- Catastrophe Ballet (1984)
- Ashes (1985)

=== EPs ===
- Deathwish (1984) (recorded 1981)

=== Live albums ===
- Catastrophe Ballet Live (1989)
- The Decomposition of Violets (1985)
- Iconologia (1993)
- The Doll's Theatre (1994) (recorded 1981)

=== Other ===
- Singles + Demos (1979)

=== Compilation albums ===
- Invocations 1981–1989 (live and studio archival recordings) (1993)

== Fronted by Valor Kand ==
=== Albums ===
- Atrocities (1986) - UK Indie #10
- The Scriptures (1987)
- Sex and Drugs and Jesus Christ (1988) - US CMJ Import #19 - UK Indie #17
- All the Love All the Hate (Part 1 – All the Love) (1989)
- All the Love All the Hate (Part 2 – All the Hate) (1989)
- Insanus, Ultio, Proditio, Misericordiaque (1990)
- Sexy Death God (1994)
- Prophecies (1996)
- Pornographic Messiah (1998)
- Born Again Anti Christian (2000)
- American Inquisition (2007)
- The Root OF ALL Evilution (2015)
- Evil Becomes Rule (2022)

=== EPs ===
- The Wind Kissed Pictures (1985)

=== Live albums ===
- Jesus Christ Proudly Presents (1987)
- The Heretics Alive (1989)
- Amen (1995)

=== Compilation albums ===
- Anthology of Live Bootlegs Vol. 1 (1988)
- Anthology of Live Bootlegs Vol. 2 (1989)
- Past Present and Forever (1988) (re-release of The Wind Kissed Pictures along with further tracks)
- Jesus Points the Bone at You? (1991)
- The Bible (1999)
- Love and Hate (2001)

=== Singles ===
- "Believers of the Unpure" (1986)
- "Sick of Love" (1987) - UK Indie #49
- "Church of No Return" (1988) - UK Indie #6
- "What's the Verdict" (1988) - UK Indie #11
- "Zero Sex" (1989)
- "We Fall Like Love"/"I Hate You" (1989)

== Christian Death II (also known as Christian Death featuring Rozz Williams) ==
=== Albums ===
- The Path of Sorrows (1993)
- The Rage of Angels (1994)

=== Live albums ===
- Heavens and Hells (1990)
- Sleepless Nights: Live 1990 (1993)
- Christian Death: Live (video; 1995)

=== Compilation albums ===
- The Iron Mask (re-recordings of old Christian Death songs and a live cover of Down in the Park) (1992)
- Mandylion (released solely in Europe under the name Christ Death) (1993)
- Invocatons (early live and demo recordings of Christian Death and a live cover of David Bowie's Dodo of 1989) (1993)
- Death in Detroit (4 remixes of Panic in Detroit and remixes of other songs) (1995)
- Death Mix (1996)
- The Best of Christian Death (Featuring: Rozz Williams) (1999)
- Death Club 1981–1993 (2005)
- Six Six Sixth Communion (2007)
- Death Box (box-set; 2012)

=== Singles ===
- "Skeleton Kiss" (1992)
- "Spiritual Cramp" (split with Sex Gang Children) (1992)
