= Dreadful Shadows =

German rock band

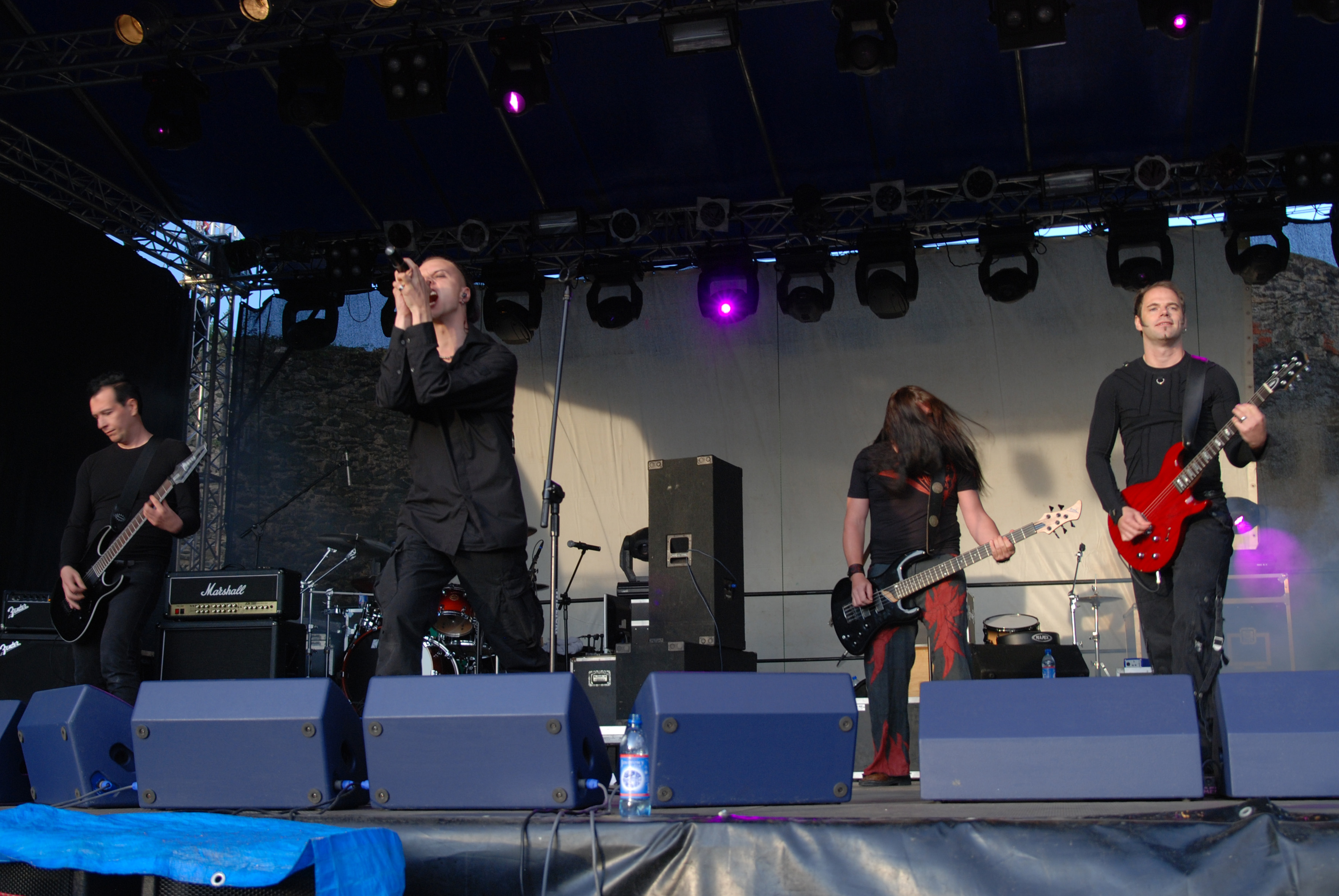
- Dreadful Shadows in 2009

Background information
- Origin: Berlin, Germany
- Genres: Gothic rock, gothic metal, darkwave
- Years active: 1993–2000; 2007–present
- Labels: Sounds of Delight, Deathwish Office, Oblivion
- Spinoffs: Zeraphine
- Members: Sven Friedrich (vocals, keyboard, acoustic guitar); André Feller (guitar); Norman Selbig (guitar); Jens Riediger (bass); Ron Thiele (backing vocals)
- Past members: Reiko Jeschke (1993); Stefan Neubauer (1993–1996); Franc Hofer (1993–1996); Sebastian Olive Lange (1996)
- Website: dreadful-shadows.de

Dreadful Shadows is a German rock band formed in 1993 in Berlin. Initially part of the gothic rock and dark wave movement, the band had developed considerably by the time of the release of their debut album, incorporating metal elements and modern electronics, causing the band to be considered part of the gothic metal genre. Dreadful Shadows disbanded in 2000 to work on separate projects.

== History ==
=== Formation ===
In 1993, Sven Friedrich, Reiko Jeschke, Franc Hofer, Jens Riediger and Ron Thiele founded Dreadful Shadows in Berlin and recorded their first demo. In the same year, guitarist Reiko was replaced by Stefan Neubauer. The band made some appearances in Germany, England and Denmark. The second demo was published, and was discovered by label Sounds of Delight. In December, the band began work on their first full-length album Estrangement, which appeared in April 1994. Dreadful Shadows commenced a European tour (touring with Love Like Blood, Nosferatu and The Eternal Afflict, among others), making a name for themselves in the Netherlands, England and Denmark.

There followed in 1994 and 1995 some sampler contributions, further concerts and a festival (with Christian Death, Armageddon Dildos and The Eternal Afflict at the Zillo festival in December 1994) helping to increase Dreadful Shadows' popularity in Germany. In February 1995, the band went back into the studio to record the Homeless EP, which appeared in June 1995. The cover version of the New Order classic True Faith established itself in some clubs as dance hit. Subsequently, the band appeared with Cyan Kills E.Coli, at the Mise Noire festival in Madrid, along with bands Mephisto Walz and Girls Under Glass.

=== 1995–2000 ===
In December 1995, Dreadful Shadows separated from label Sounds of Delight. The band subsequently signed to Deathwish Office, the band-owned label of Love Like Blood. In March 1996, work began on the second LP Buried Again. During the process, the two guitarists Stefan Neubauer and Franc Hofer left Dreadful Shadows due to internal conflicts. Sven Friedrich and Tom Tony took over the guitar parts. In July 1996 André Feller left and a temporary guitarist in Sebastian Oliver Lange (In Extremo) was found. The latter was replaced on a long-term basis by Norman Selbig. The new line-up made an appearance at the Wave-Gotik-Treffen, followed by the album Buried Again and a tour of Germany and Europe (including an appearance at the Sacrosanct festival in London with bands such as Rosetta Stone and Vendemmian in August 1996).

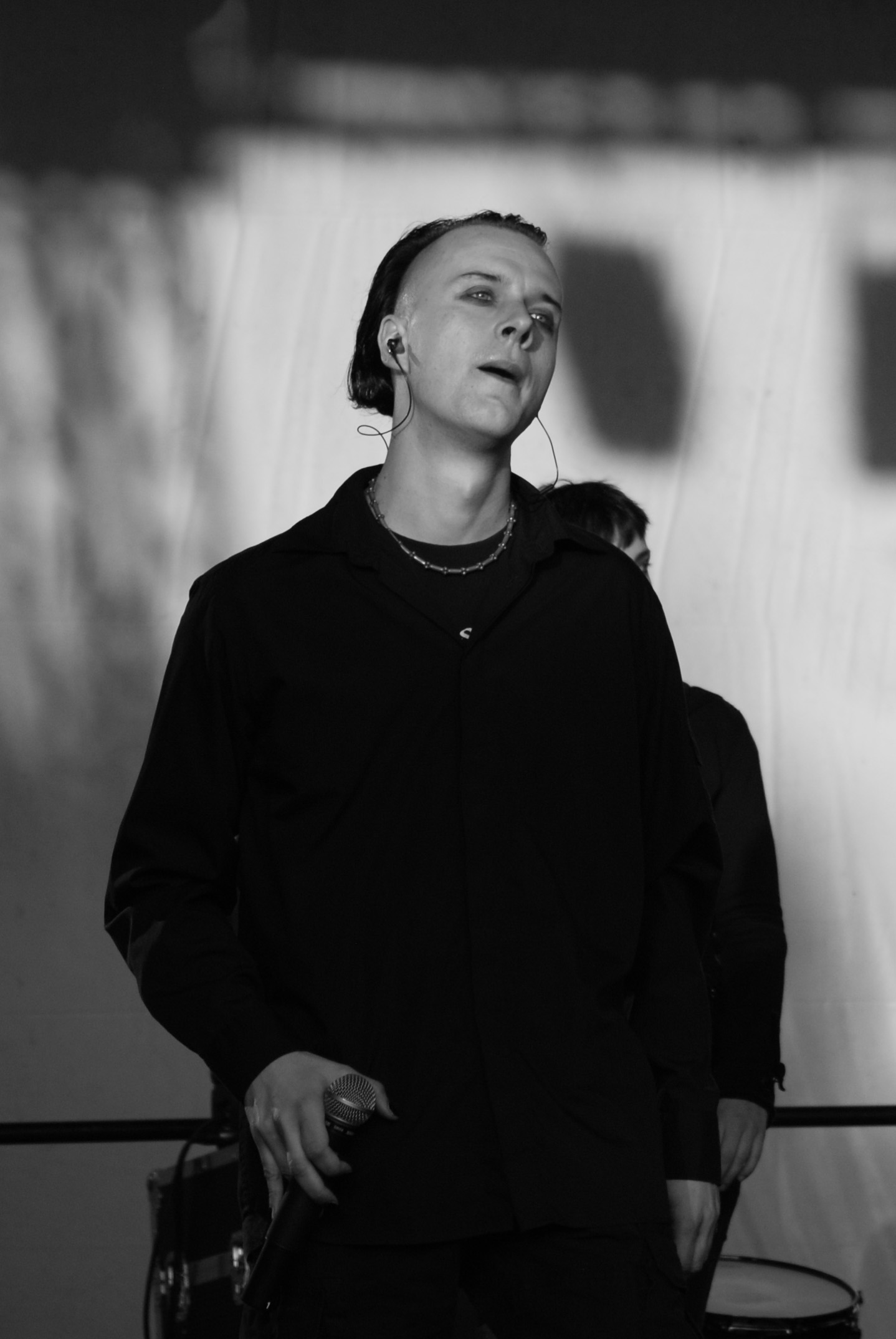
Frontman Sven Friedrich

In 1997, Dreadful Shadows moved to the record company Oblivion, releasing the single Burning the Shrouds. Following a support tour with fellow gothic metal band Paradise Lost, the band's third studio album, Beyond The Maze, was released in February 1998. The promo tour took the band to Beirut/Lebanon. The release of the Tanita Tikaram cover Twist in My Sobriety concluded a successful year. Their qualities as live band were proved in 1999 when the Dreadful Shadows embarked on an extensive European tour.

In July 1999, the band recorded tracks for Gitane Demone's Stars of Trash album at Thommy Hein Tonstudios in Berlin.

Dreadful Shadows' last studio album, The Cycle, was released in September 1999. The band embarked on their final tour of Germany in the year 2000. Sven Friedrich and Norman Selbig formed Zeraphine shortly after the split. André and Ron formed 'Coma 51', whilst Jens formed his own label Andromeda Records and also the band 'Thanateros'.

=== 2000–2007: Post-breakup ===
During the years that followed, many of the Dreadful Shadows albums were remastered and re-released. First, in 2000 the double CD Estrangement + Homeless was released. It featured edited artwork and remixed sound. And later, in 2003, Buried Again was re-released with similar treatment and bonus tracks, such as cover versions of David Bowie and Marilyn Manson, and remixed versions of "Dusk" and "Paradize".

Also, in 2001, Beyond the Maze and The Cycle were repackaged and sold as one double CD by the label Oblivion, but they were not remastered.

=== 2007: Live shows and solo projects ===
In 2007, several concerts were planned with Dreadful Shadows performing together as a group. The band stated that this was not a reunion, as no new material was being performed or recorded. Fans could vote for the songs they wanted to hear on the band's website.

In related news, vocalist Sven Friedrich launched his solo project, Solar Fake. Solar Fake is an electro project and brings what Friedrich describes as "pulsating sequencers, driving beats and sometimes wild and aggressive vocals with intensive melodies and melancholic moments." A debut album was planned for release in February 2008 via Synthetic Symphony/SPV.

== Discography ==
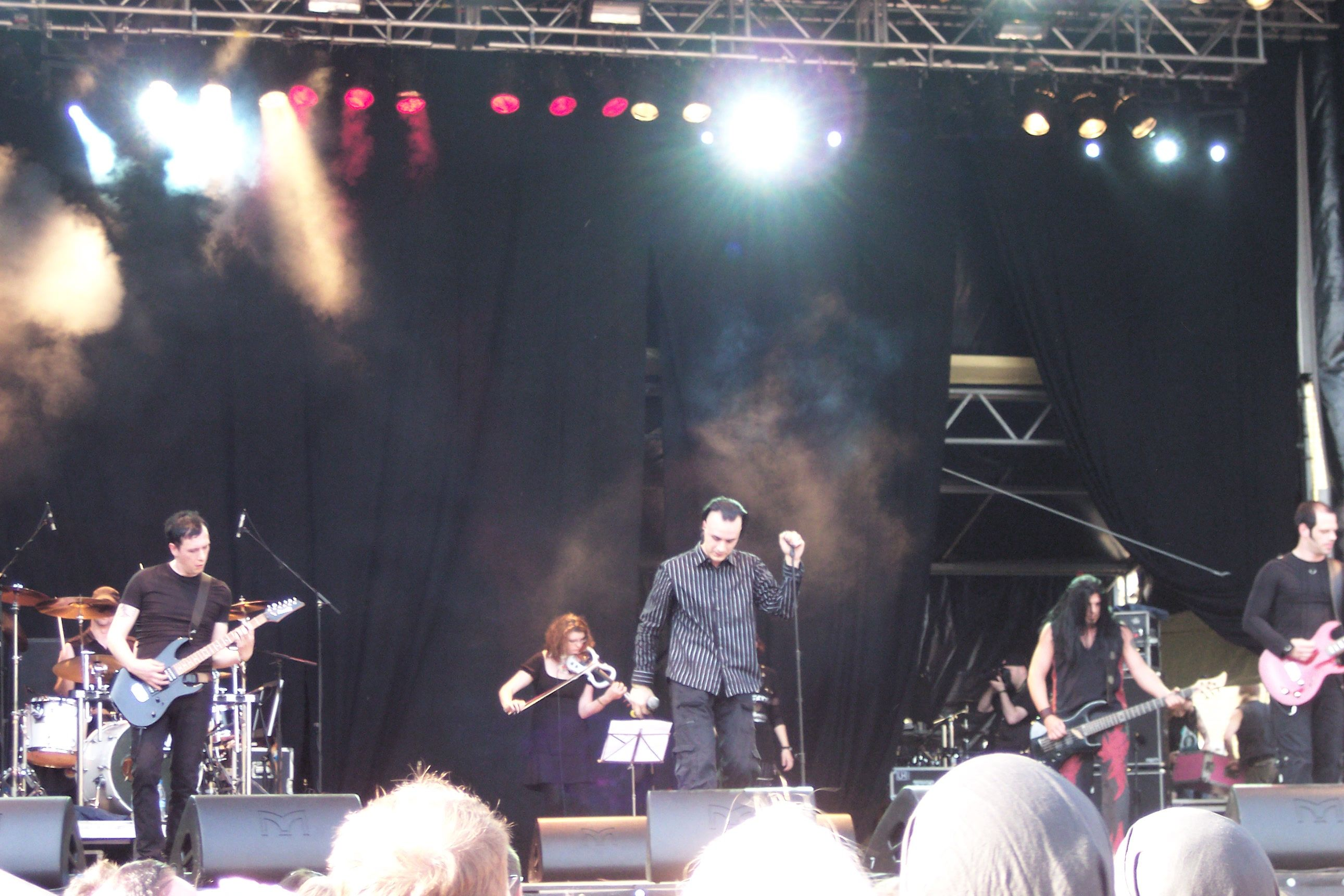
Dreadful Shadows at Zita Rock Festival 2008

=== Albums ===
- Estrangement (1994)
- Buried Again (1997; re-released 2003 with bonus tracks)
- Beyond the Maze (1998; limited edition issued with bonus live CD)
- The Cycle (1999)

=== Singles and EPs ===
- "Homeless EP" (1994) EP
- "Burning the Shrouds" (1998) single
- "Twist in My Sobriety" (1999) single
- "Futility" (1999) single
- Apology EP (2000) sold only at shows
