= The Scriptures (album) =

Studio album by Christian Death
- Released: 1987
- Recorded: 1987
- Label: Normal Records; Jungle Records Cleopatra Records; Candlelight Records
- Producer: Valor

Christian Death chronology
Atrocities (1986)	The Scriptures (1987)	Sex and Drugs and Jesus Christ (1988)

The Scriptures was Christian Death's fifth album and is seen as an essay on comparative world religions. The liner notes state that the work is "a translation of world beliefs by Valor." The album, like Atrocities, is split into two acts, though later reissues would omit these subtitles. The first 10,000 versions of the original LP record came with a free seven inch single containing two songs: "Jezebel's Tribulation" and "Wraeththu". Some CD reissues of the album feature these songs as bonus tracks. The completion of recording on The Scriptures would see David Glass leave the group and like previous members Barry Galvin and Johann Schumann, would go on to play in Mephisto Walz.

== Reception ==
Professional ratings
Review scores
Source	Rating
AllMusic	3/5 stars
Trouser Press	unfavorable

AllMusic described the album as "rather grandiose and pretentious", but "one of the band's strongest albums" released by Valor Kand's incarnation of the band. Trouser Press described it as "a laughable comparative history of religion" and "truly offensive".

== Track listing ==
"The Days of Yore and Nonce"

1. "Prelude" (Valor) – 1:57
2. "Song of Songs" (Valor) – 5:15
3. "Vanity" (Valor) – 2:55
4. "The Four Horsemen" (Valor) – 4:48
5. "1983" (Jimi Hendrix cover) – 9:58

"The Womb of Time"

1. "Omega Dawn" (Valor, David Glass) – 3:19
2. "A Ringing in Their Ears" (Valor, Glass) – 1:37
3. "Golden Age" (Valor, Kota) – 3:29
4. "Alpha Sunset" (Valor, Glass) – 2:01
5. "Spilt Blood" (Valor, Glass) – 0:58
6. "Raw War" (Valor, Glass) – 6:32
7. "Reflections" (Valor, R. Spitzer, Glass) – 6:20

== Personnel ==
- Valor – vocals, guitar, violin, piano
- Gitane DeMone – vocals, keyboards
- Kota – bass
- James Beam – guitar, vocals
- David Glass – drums
