= The Wind Kissed Pictures =

EP by Christian Death
- Released: 1985
- Recorded: 1985
- Labels: Nostradamus Records, Supporti Fonografici
- Producers: Valor Kand, Christian Death

Christian Death chronology
| Ashes (1985) | The Wind Kissed Pictures (1985) | Atrocities (1986) |

Singles from The Wind Kissed Pictures
- 1. "Believers of the Unpure" Released: 1985

The Wind Kissed Pictures is an EP by American deathrock band Christian Death, and is the debut release featuring Valor Kand on vocals. It was released in 1985 through Nostradamus Records and has spawned one single, "Believers of the Unpure". On the album, the band's title is made longer, calling themselves For Sin and Sacrifice Must We Die a Christian Death. Allmusic gave the album two stars out of five. However, they claimed it to be "some of the finest post-Rozz Williams work Christian Death would produce."

== Release ==
The Wind Kissed Pictures was released in 1985 through Nostradamus Records on twelve-inch vinyl. As well as a regular 4-track vinyl release, it was released with a single sided seven-inch of the song "Lacrima Christi". On the vinyl release, side A plays at 45 rpm and side B 33 ⅓ rpm. The same year they released "Believers of the Unpure" as a single on 12" vinyl, backed with "Between Youth" and "After the Rain". In 1986, the EP was made available on cassette with a new cover in the US, as well as it being released again on vinyl.

== Track listing ==
All songs written by Valor Kand, except where noted

A side

1. "Believers of the Unpure" - 8:32

B side

1. "Overture" - 3:32
2. "The Wind Kissed Pictures" - 7:06 (Valor Kand, Barry Galvin, Johann Schumann)
3. "The Lake of Fire" - 2:39

== Release history ==
| Region | Date | Format(s) |
|---|---|---|
| Worldwide | 1985 | 12" vinyl |
| UK, US | 1986 | cassette, 12" vinyl |
| UK | 31 December 1999 | CD |

== Personnel ==
Christian Death

- Valor Kand - vocals, lead guitar, keyboards
- Barry Galvin - guitar, keyboards
- Gitane DeMone - keyboards, backing vocals
- Johann Schumann - bass
- David Glass - drums

Design

- Cover - Valor Kand, David Glass, Johann Schumann
- Booklet design - Valor Kand
- Illustration - Renzo Vespignani (pages 2, 4, 6)
- Back cover poem - Gitane DeMone
