= Atrocities (album) =

Atrocitites

Studio album by Christian Death
- Released: 1986
- Recorded: 1985
- Studio: Rockfield (Monmouth, Wales)
- Length: 41:03
- Label: Normal Records
- Producer: Valor

Christian Death chronology
The Wind Kissed Pictures (1985)	Atrocitites (1986)	The Scriptures (1987)

Professional ratings
Review scores
Source	Rating
AllMusic	3/5 stars
Trouser Press	unfavorable

Atrocities is the fourth studio album by American rock band Christian Death, released in 1986 through record label Normal.

The album's subject matter deals almost exclusively with the Holocaust, including songs about Auschwitz and Josef Mengele. Recorded at Rockfield Studios in Monmouth, Wales it also featured the songwriting and arrangement skills of Barry Galvin, who, along with Johann Schumann, would leave the group upon the completion of Atrocities – both went on to form Mephisto Walz.

It is the first Christian Death record with Valor Kand taking over main duties following Rozz Williams' departure.

== Track listing ==
Prologue

1. "Will-o-the-Wisp" (Valor) – 3:15
2. "Tales of Innocence" (Valor, B. Galvin) – 6:23
3. "Strapping Me Down" (Valor, B. Galvin) – 2:36
4. "The Danzig Waltz" (Valor) – 3:31
5. "Chimere De-ci De-la" (Valor) – 4:41

Finale

1. "Silent Thunder" (Valor, B. Galvin) – 6:32
2. "Strange Fortune" (Valor) – 3:52
3. "Ventriloquist" (Valor) – 4:31
4. "Gloomy Sunday" (Sam M. Lewis, Rezső Seress) – 3:01
5. "The Death of Josef" (Valor, D. Glass) – 4:41

== Personnel ==
- Valor Kand – vocals, guitar, violin, piano
- Gitane Demone – vocals, keyboards
- Johann Schumann – bass
- Barry Galvin – guitar, vocals
- David Glass – drums
