= Pompeii 99 =

American post-punk band

- Origin: Los Angeles, California, U.S.
- Genres: Post-punk
- Years active: 1981–1983
- Labels: Nostradamus Records
- Spinoffs: Christian Death
- Past members: Valor Kand; Gitane DeMone; David Glass; Cram Netod; Poli-Sci

Pompeii 99 was an American post-punk band formed in Los Angeles in 1981. They released one single and one album before the core members of the band (Valor Kand, Gitane DeMone and David Glass) joined Rozz Williams for a new version of Christian Death in 1983, and eventually continued with the Christian Death name after all the original members had left the group. Aside from Kand, the main songwriter during this period was Cram Netod (Marc Doten), who later went on to perform with Double Naught Spy Car.

== History ==
The group began in 1981 in Los Angeles when guitarist/vocalist Kand responded to an ad for "female vocalist available" in Los Angeles newspaper The Recycler, placed by singer Demone. A subsequent ad in this paper yielded drummer Glass (aka David Parkinson), who introduced Kand to bassist Netod, who in turn introduced keyboardist Poli-Sci (Polly Klemmer).

After the release of the bands' 1982 debut album, Look at Yourself (1982), on their own Nostradamus label, they began to receive radio airplay in California and notoriety in the Los Angeles press. Until this time they had only played shows in local clubs, including support slots for visiting UK bands including Public Image Ltd, New Order and Angelic Upstarts. Their second release on Nostradamus, later in 1982, was the Ignorance Is the Control 7-inch EP. At the final stages of an imminent record deal with A&M Records, A&R rep Aaron Jacoves was fired and the deal was canceled.

Kand and Glass later began talks with Rozz Williams, the singer of the then-defunct Christian Death, and Williams joined Pompeii 99 in August 1983. The band was offered a record deal with French label L'Invitation Au Suicide, whose president, Yann Farcy, persuaded the band to change their name from Pompeii 99 to Christian Death. After reluctantly agreeing to the name change, Pompeii 99 ceased.

== Members ==
- Valor Kand – vocals, guitar
- Gitane DeMone – vocals, guitar
- David Glass – drums
- Poli-Sci – vocals, organ, synth
- Cram Netod – bass, piano, guitar, vocals

== Discography ==
Studio albums

- Look at Yourself (1982, Nostradamus Records)

EPs

- Ignorance Is the Control 7-inch (1982, Nostradamus Records)
