= Diet of Worms (disambiguation) =

Diet of Worms most commonly refers to the Diet of Worms of 1521 at which Martin Luther was outlawed as a heretic. It may also refer to:

== Historic events ==
Meetings of the Imperial Diet of the Holy Roman Empire in the city of Worms, Germany, including:

- Diet of Worms (1076), an ecclesiastical synod and diet at the beginning of the Investiture Controversy
- Diet of Worms (1122), a diet producing the Concordat of Worms, an agreement between the Catholic Church and the empire ending the Investiture Controversy
- Diet of Worms (1495), a diet at which comprehensive political reforms of the empire began
- Other diets convened at Worms in the years 829, 895, 926, 1231 and 1545

== Media ==
- Diet of Worms (comedy group), an Irish comedy and theatre group based in Dublin and London
- "Diet of Worms", a song by This Heat from their self-titled album
- Diet of Worms, a band fronted by former Savatage vocalist Damond Jiniya

== Medicine and science ==
- A colloquialism for helminthic therapy, an immunotherapy for inflammatory bowel diseases by means of parasitic worms

== See also ==
- Worms as food
