= Deathwish (EP) =

EP by Christian Death
- Released: 1984
- Recorded: 1981
- Studios: Orange County Studios, California, United States
- Genre: Deathrock
- Length: 19:49
- Label: l'Invitation au Suicide

Christian Death chronology
Only Theatre of Pain (1982)	Deathwish (1984)	Catastrophe Ballet (1984)

Deathwish is an EP by American deathrock band Christian Death. It consists of demos recorded by the band in 1981, prior to the release of Christian Death's debut album Only Theatre of Pain, but was not released until 1984 by French record label l'Invitation au Suicide.

Deathwish was recorded in 1981 at Orange County Studios in California, prior to the band signing to Frontier Records for Only Theatre of Pain (1982).

== Critical reception ==
Professional ratings
Review scores
Source	Rating
AllMusic	3/5 stars

In a retrospective review for AllMusic, critic Ned Raggett gave the EP 3 out of 5 stars and wrote that "[the EP is] a great peek into some of the band's roughest beginnings".

== Track listing ==
Side A
No.	Title	Length
1.	"Deathwish"	2:13
2.	"Romeo's Distress" (Nouvelle Version)	3:22
3.	"Dogs"	2:52

Side B
No.	Title	Length
1.	"Desperate Hell"	4:21
2.	"Spiritual Cramp" (Nouvelle Version)	3:15
3.	"Cavity" (Nouvelle Version)	3:46
Total length:		19:49

== Personnel ==
- Rozz Williams – lead vocals
- Rikk Agnew – guitars
- James McGearty – bass guitars
- George Belanger – drums
