= Music Connection =

US magazine

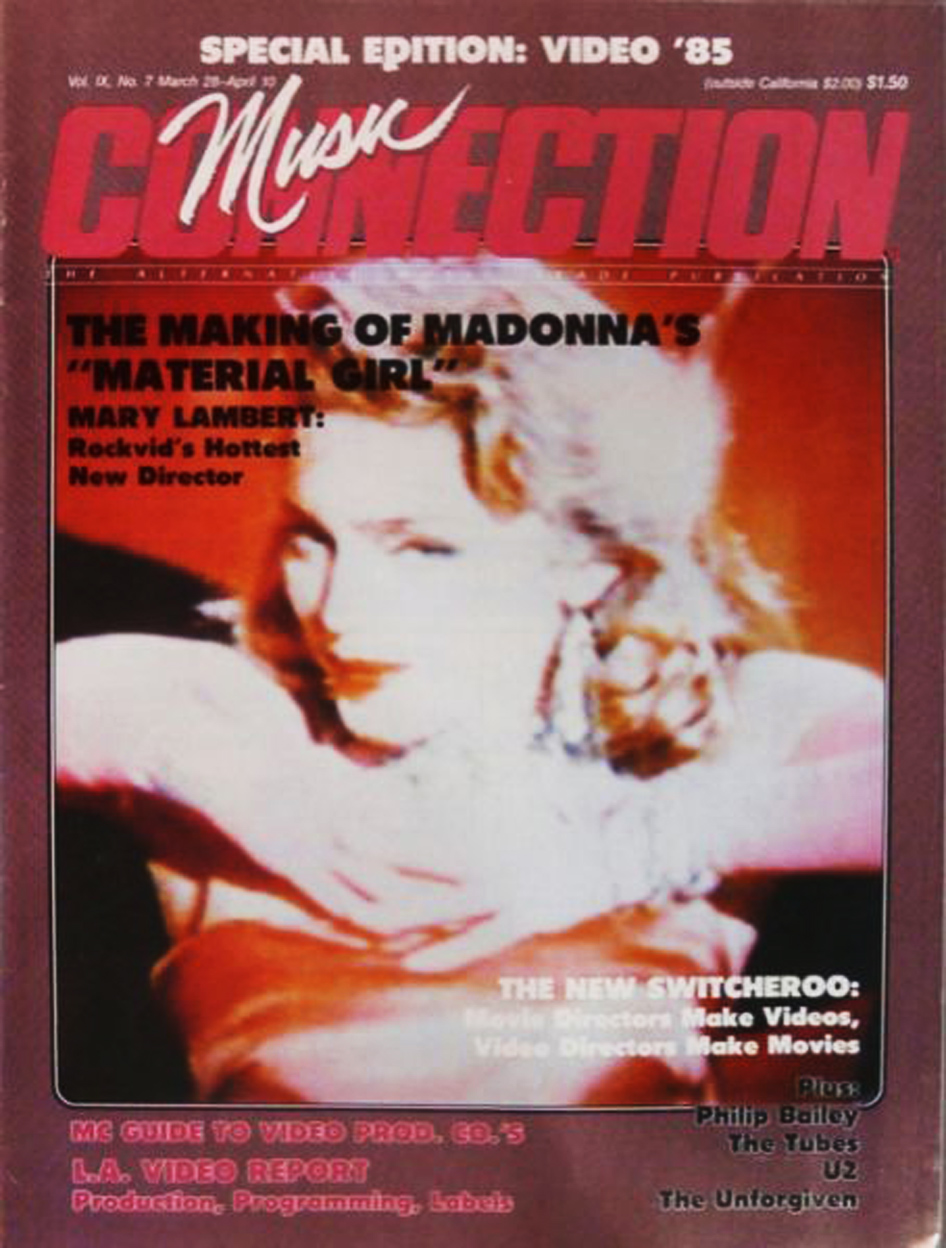
- Cover for March 1985, featuring Madonna
- Editor: Brett Callwood
- Categories: Music magazine
- Frequency: Monthly
- Publisher: E. Eric Bettelli
- Total circulation (2011): 75,000
- First issue: November 10, 1977
- Company: Music Connection Inc.
- Country: United States
- Based in: Glendale, California
- Language: English
- Website: musicconnection.com
- ISSN: 1091-9791

Music Connection is a United States–based monthly music trade magazine that began publication in 1977. The magazine caters to career-minded musicians, songwriters, recording artists, and assorted music industry supporting personnel. Initially, the magazine focused solely on the Southern California music scene, but has since expanded to a national distribution. The publication and its website provide information about the music business, including directories of contact information for professionals and free classifieds for musicians. Music Connection also publishes reviews of unsigned and independent live performers and recording artists. Several acclaimed artists achieved their first music magazine cover status from Music Connection including Guns N' Roses, Madonna, Jane's Addiction, Alanis Morissette, The White Stripes, and Adele.

== Beginnings ==
Music Connection magazine was founded in 1977 in Los Angeles, California, by J. Michael Dolan, an unsigned singer-songwriter who worked as a background engineer and projectionist at various film and TV studios. Looking for songwriting opportunities but finding limited resources, Dolan conceived the idea of a weekly music publication, featuring articles and reviews comparable to those in Cashbox and Billboard, alongside free classifieds inspired by The Recycler. He invited Eric Bettelli to join the company as its first Vice President of Advertising. The publication eventually gained recognition among industry executives and musicians, who referred to it as “the musician’s bible.” Subsequently, Michael launched Songwriter Connection magazine, which became part of the Music Connection suite of products and services. In 2010, after 33 years as CEO, Michael sold his shares of Music Connection Inc. to Eric Bettelli, who is now serves as the sole publisher, with then-senior editor Mark Nardone promoted to Associate Publisher/Senior Editor.

== Online ==
Music Connection has maintained an online presence since 1997. The digital edition has an archive dating back to January 2008. The company launched the AMP Network in 2007.

== Annual Top Artist lists ==
At the end of each year, Music Connection publishes a "Hot 100 Live Unsigned Artists and Bands" list of live performers, and a "Top 25 New Music Critiques" list of unsigned recording artists. Artists who have appeared on the Hot 100 list include Holy Ghost!, Sara Bareilles, and Steel Panther.

== National Directories ==
Music Connection publishes a series of annually updated directories containing music industry contact information. The directories cover areas such as music attorneys, record label A&R representatives, music schools, vocal coaches, mastering studios, film/TV music supervisors, music publishers, producers, engineers, managers, booking agents, guitar and bass instructors, recording studios, indie record labels, marketers and promoters, publicists, rehearsal studios, gear rental/cartage/tech services, duplicators and replicators, and merchandise manufacturers.
