= All the Love =

All the Love may refer to:

- All the Love (album), 2001 album by Oleta Adams
- All the Love All the Hate (Part One: All the Love), 1989 album by Christian Death
- "All the Love" (Ayra Starr song), 2025
- "All the Love" (Kanye West song), 2026
- "All the Love" (The Outfield song), 1986
- "All the Love", song by Kate Bush from the album The Dreaming
- "All the Love", song by Katy Perry from the album 143
