= Michael Helding =

German Roman Catholic bishop, scholar, writer and humanist

The Most Reverend Michael Helding
- Auxiliary Bishop of Mainz; Titular Bishop of Sidon
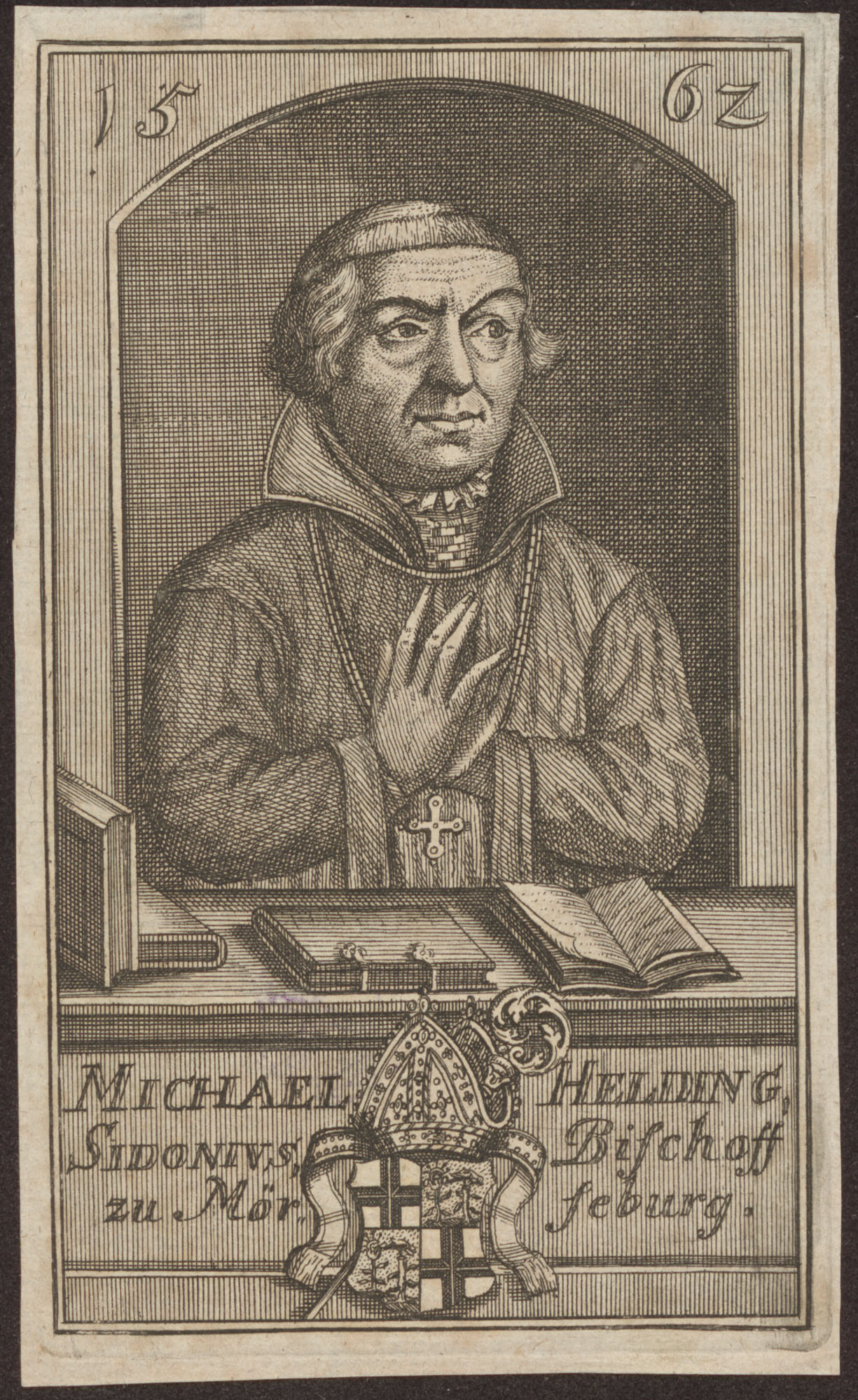
- Michael Helding
- Church: Roman Catholic
- Diocese: Diocese of Merseburg
- In office: 1549–1561
- Previous post: Auxiliary Bishop of Mainz (1538–1549)

Orders
- Ordination: 1533
- Consecration: 4 August 1538 by Albert of Brandenburg

Personal details
- Born: 1506 Langenenslingen, Germany
- Died: 30 September 1561 (aged 54–55) Merseburg, Germany

Michael Helding (1506–30 September 1561) was a Roman Catholic bishop, scholar, writer and humanist. He is also known by his pen-name of Sidonius.

== Life ==
Helding was born in Langenenslingen bei Riedlingen/Sigmaringen, a miller's son. In autumn 1525 he matriculated at the University of Tübingen. At Pentecost in 1527 he graduated BA and at Christmas 1528 as MA. He became a lecturer in Mainz, where he became rector of the Domschule (cathedral school) in 1531. There he began his lifelong close contact with humanism. After being ordained as a priest, he worked under Cardinal Albrecht of Brandenburg at Mainz Cathedral from 1533 onwards.

On 18 October 1537 he was selected to become auxiliary bishop of Mainz and was ordained to that role on 4 August the following year. He was also appointed titular bishop of Sidon. In 1543 he graduated as a doctor of theology. He served as a Roman Catholic delegate at the 1540-1541 Diet of Worms. He also attended the Council of Trent; Helding arrived at Trent on 18 May 1545 as Albrecht's procurator, and left on 8 January 1546, being recalled to Germany to attend the Diet of Regensburg.

At the 'armoured' Diet of Augsburg of 1547-48 he became the co-author of the Augsburg Interim, drawing harsh polemics from Matthias Flacius and other Protestants. In December 1550 he became the successor to the Protestant George III, Prince of Anhalt-Dessau as the last Catholic Bishop of Merseburg. He was present at the Council of Augsburg in 1555 and in the autumn of 1557 at the Colloquy of Worms, where his questions caused internal conflict between Lutheran theologians. In 1561, less than a year before Helding's death, Ferdinand I appointed him head of the Imperial Council in Vienna. He died in Vienna, aged about 55.

Helding is considered one of the most important proponents of Catholic Reform of his time, who tried to use his speeches and writings to maintain Christian unity and to contribute actively towards what he saw as a necessary reform of the Roman Catholic church. He remained true to Catholicism, but was still friendly to reform and tolerant towards the Protestant denominations and other faiths.

== Bibliography ==
- Paul Tschackert: Helding, Michael. In: Allgemeine Deutsche Biographie (ADB). Band 34, Duncker & Humblot, Leipzig 1892, S. 164–166.
- Friedrich Wilhelm Bautz: HELDING, Michael. In: Biographisch-Bibliographisches Kirchenlexikon (BBKL). Band 2, Bautz, Hamm 1990, ISBN 3-88309-032-8, Sp. 696–698.

Catholic Church titles
| Preceded by Antoine, Auxiliary Bishop of Paris | Titular Bishop of Sidon; 1538–1549 | Succeeded by Georg Neumann (bishop) |
| Preceded by | Auxiliary Bishop of Mainz; 1538–1549 | Succeeded by |
| Preceded by Sigismund von Lindenau | Bishop of Merseburg; 1549–1561 | Succeeded by |
