= Zeraphine =

German rock band

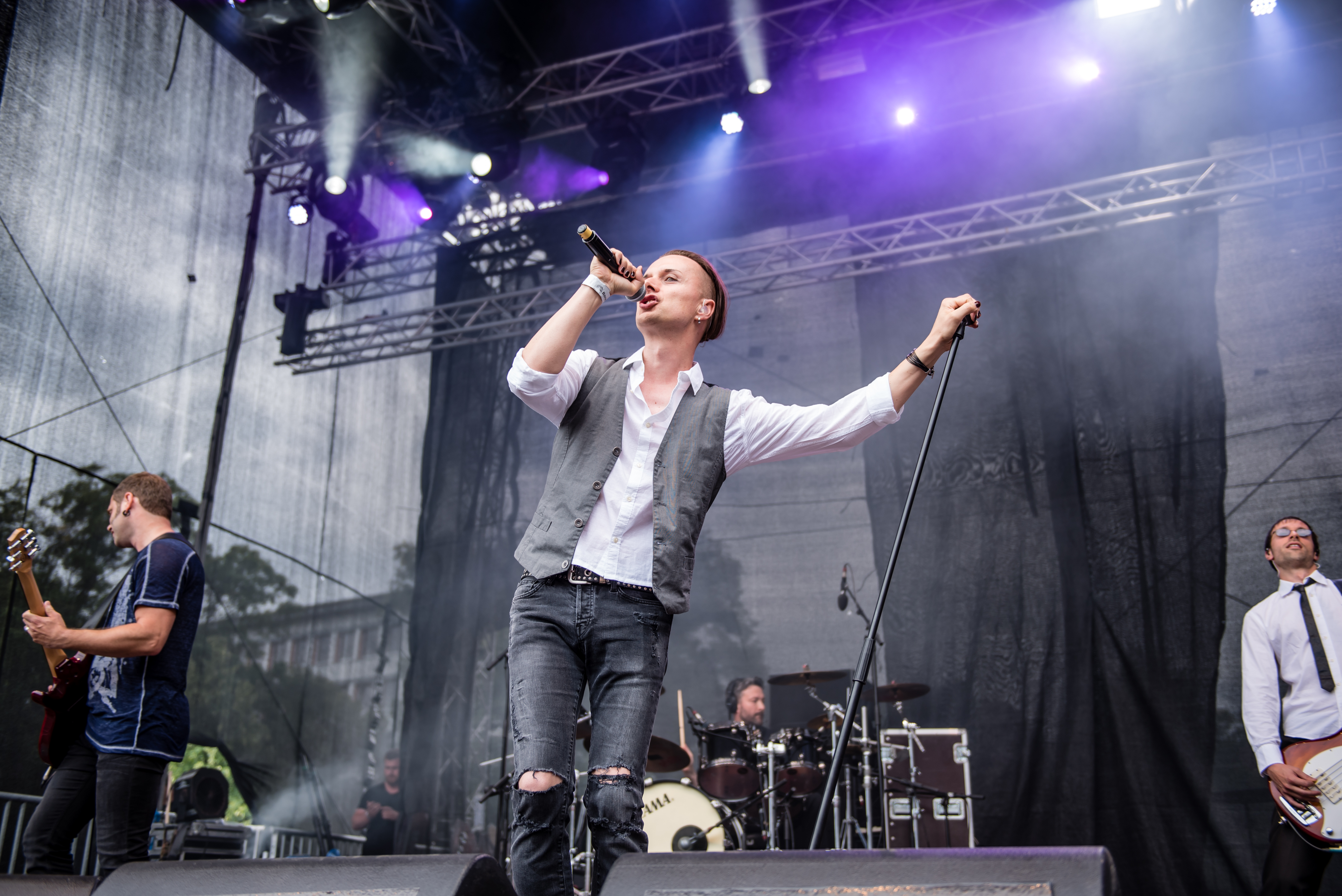
- Zeraphine in 2015

Background information
- Origin: Germany
- Genres: Alternative rock; gothic rock; gothic metal; dark rock
- Years active: 2000–present
- Labels: Phonyx; Drakkar
- Spinoffs: Solar Fake
- Members: Sven Friedrich (vocals, programming); Norman Selbig (guitars); Manuel Senger (guitars); Michael Nepp (bass); Marcellus Puhlemann (drums)
- Website: zeraphine.de

Zeraphine is a German rock band from Berlin formed in 2000 by Sven Friedrich (vocals, programming, lead songwriting) and Norman Selbig (guitars) from the then-defunct Dreadful Shadows.

== History ==
After the acclaimed goth rock band Dreadful Shadows decided to split and go their separate ways, Sven and Norman collaborated with ex-Dreadful Shadows producer Thommy Hein on a project called Helix. However, since the Helix name was taken by another band, they were forced to rename themselves Zeraphine – taken from the Hebrew Bible's concepts of the seraph (or seraphim), a class of angel in traditional Judaism and Orthodox Christianity. Once Zeraphine, the band signed onto the Drakkar Entertainment record label.

Originally, additional band members Manuel Senger (guitars), Michael Nepp (bass), and Marcellus Puhlemann (drums) joined the project as studio musicians. This changed after their debut album was released, and each member began contributing music and ideas to all following releases.

Zeraphine's debut album, Kalte Sonne (2002), gained notoriety for its lyrics; unlike Dreadful Shadows, whose songs were written entirely in English, Sven elected to pen an album completely in German, citing that "I simply tried to transfer my style of writing to my mother tongue and I liked it quite a lot. I always thought it would be impossible." Their following album, Traumaworld (2003), saw Sven return to English, with only two songs written in German. Tonally, the album's lyrics were harsher, as the band drew inspiration from their feelings on the Iraq War. However, when it came to promoting the album, the more upbeat "Be My Rain" (2003) was chosen as the single. A music video was made for "Be My Rain" (consisting of live footage), and a limited promo CD was released, featuring album, radio, and club mixes of the title track, and a cover of the Depeche Mode song "In Your Room".

In 2004, Zeraphine joined HIM on an acclaimed tour of Europe, which exposed the band to an even wider audience. In anticipation for the tour, Zeraphine hit the studio again to record the single "New Year's Day" (2004), featuring a cover version of the U2 song, and two other original tracks. Promptly after the tour finished, Zeraphine again entered the studio and churned out another single, "Die Macht in dir" (2004), which promised a full album at the beginning of the following year. The single, as well as the title track, consisted of alternative versions of "Kaltes Herz", "Die Macht in dir", (and on the limited edition release) "Until I Finally Drown". Blind Camera (2005) was released with a positive response by both fans and critics, and sent Zeraphine on the road once more, headlining their own trip across Europe. A particular point of well-reception was the balance in German and English lyrics – nearly half the songs on Blind Camera are written in German. The record itself was written as a semi-concept album, dealing with themes such as perception and reality.

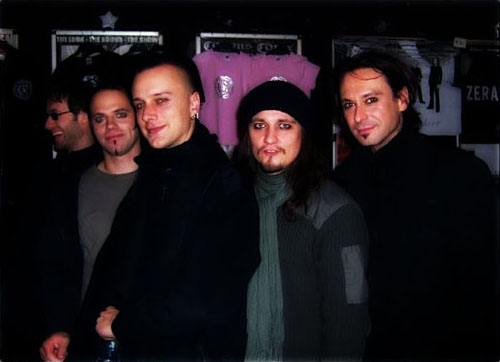
Zeraphine in 2006

In 2006, Zeraphine announced that they were severing their ties with their label, Drakkar Entertainment, so that they could have more creative control over their next record. Still (2006), released on the Phonyx Records label (a record label managed by the band themselves, and producer Thommy Hein), was handled with noticeably less 'polish' than their previous albums. This was per the band's decision to move to a less studio-oriented, more live sounding style of recording. Two editions of the album were released, a regular and an enhanced version; the enhanced featuring an additional song, and the music video (and outtakes) to the title track and single, "Still". The record's title is meant to represent both its German and English meanings, commenting on the duality of the album's lyrical content.

The band was decidedly less active in 2007, when Sven and Norman rejoined Dreadful Shadows for live shows exclusively. Also during this time, Sven began working on a side project, an electronic solo project titled Solar Fake. A compilation album was also released during this time, titled Years in Black (2007), by Phoynx Records and Drakkar Entertainment; It contained songs from all four albums, and while no unreleased material was put on it (an update on their official website cited such an act as a "fan rip-off"), the currently out-of-print radio mix of "Be My Rain" was added in place of the album version. Zeraphine continued to tour and do festivals throughout 2007 and 2008, with a few new songs slipping into setlists during the later half of 2008.

== Discography ==
=== Albums ===
- Kalte Sonne (2002)
- Traumaworld (2003)
- Blind Camera (2005)
- Still (2006)
- Whiteout (2010)
- Tributes (2019; 11-tracked cover album released in a limited edition of 1,000 copies, exclusively for Shadowplay fanclub members.)

=== Compilations ===
- Years in Black (2007)

=== Singles ===
- "Die Wirklichkeit" (2002 promo-only single)
- "Be My Rain" (2003 promo-only single)
- "New Year's Day" (2004)
- "Die Macht in dir" (2004)
