= Lover of Sin =

American band

- Origin: United States
- Genres: Black metal, deathrock
- Years active: 2002–present
- Label: Candlelight Records
- Members: Valor Kand; Maitri; Akadian; Nabu Kadnezzer; Ishtar; Juan 'Punchy' Gonzalez

Lover of Sin is an American black metal/deathrock band containing members of Christian Death (Maitri/Valor), Diet of Worms (band) member Juan "Punchy" Gonzalez, Tony Norman (live) from Monstrosity and Morbid Angel, Howard Davis (live) from Genitorturers, and guest vocals by Damond Jiniya of Savatage. The band released their self-titled debut in 2003 through Candlelight Records. It was often mistaken for a Christian Death album.

Lover of Sin released a new record in June 2012 entitled Horny Beast. Maitri, Punchy, and Allister Pike returned for the second release. The record featured guest performances by George Kollias, Karl Sanders, Destructhor, Elizabeth Schall, and Ralph Santolla.
