= All the Love All the Hate (Part One: All the Love) =

All the Love

Studio album by Christian Death
- Released: 1989
- Genre: Hard rock, progressive rock, heavy metal
- Label: Jungle Records, Normal Records
- Producer: Nick Farr, Valor Kand

Christian Death chronology
Sex & Drugs & Jesus Christ (1988)	All the Love (1989)	All the Hate (1989)

Singles from All the Love
- 1. "We Fall Like Love" Released: 1989

All the Love is the seventh studio album by American deathrock band Christian Death, released through Jungle Records in 1989. It is the first part of the two-part series All the Love and All the Hate, the next being All the Hate. The album was released on cassette, CD and vinyl. The vinyl release of the album was available on regular black vinyl, and limited edition pink marble vinyl. One single was released from the album, "We Fall Like Love", on seven-inch and twelve-inch vinyl.

== Track listing ==
All songs written by Valor Kand, except where noted

Appollyon

1. "Live Love Together" – 3:20
2. "We Fall Like Love" – 5:03
3. "Love Don't Let Me Down" – 8:48 (Nick Farr, Kand)
4. "Suivre la trace de quelqu'un" – 4:33 (Farr, Kand)

Birth

1. "Love Is Like a (B)Itchin' in My Heart" – 4:46 (Farr, Kand)
2. "I'm Using You (For Love)" – 6:04
3. "Deviate Love" – 3:14
4. "Angel" – 4:45 (Jimi Hendrix)
5. "Woman to Mother Earth" – 4:36
