= Sigismund von Lindenau =

German bishop

The Most Reverend Sigismund von Lindenau
- Bishop of Merseburg
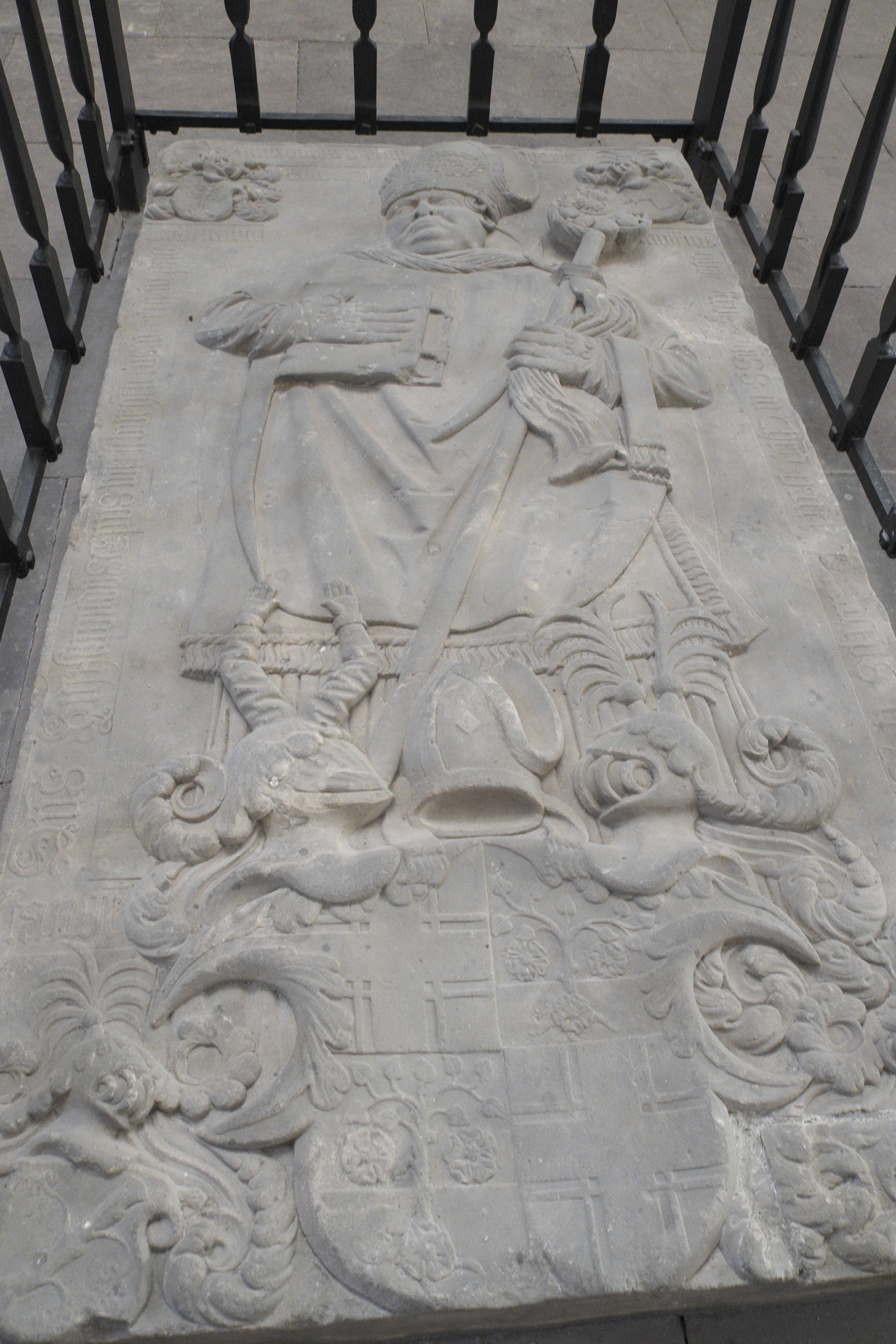
- Tomb of Bishop Sigismund von Lindenau in Merseburg Cathedral
- Church: Roman Catholic
- Diocese: Diocese of Merseburg
- In office: 1535–1544
- Predecessor: Vincent of Schleinitz
- Successor: Augustus of Saxony

Personal details
- Born: c. 1484
- Died: 4 January 1544

Sigismund von Lindenau (c. 1484 – 4 January 1544) was Bishop of Merseburg from 1535 to 1544.

Sigismund came from the von Lindenau family, named after Lindenau, now a district of Leipzig. He was the last Catholic bishop of the Merseburg diocese until Michael Helding was appointed in 1549. Lindenau's successor was the Protestant administrator Augustus of Saxony, who asserted his influence as Elector of Saxony and drew the neighboring bishoprics to himself. In the diocese itself, the majority of the population embraced the new faith, and even Sigismund was open to the new faith. Just one year after Sigismund's death, Martin Luther preached in Merseburg Cathedral.

Sigismund carried out structural measures at Lützen Castle. He expanded the cathedral. In the castle of Bad Lauchstädt, his coat of arms bears witness to his building activity.

== Literature ==
- Saxonia: Museum of Saxon patriotism, Volume 3
