= American Inquisition =

Studio album by Christian Death
- Released: October 15, 2007 (worldwide); October 22, 2007 (USA)
- Recorded: Little Squaw Studios, Squaw Mountain, Maine; DOW Studios, Tampa, Florida
- Genre: Gothic rock; industrial rock; Gothic Metal
- Length: 69:45
- Label: Season of Mist
- Producer: Valor Kand, Maitri

Christian Death chronology
Born Again Anti-Christian (2000)	American Inquisition (2007)	The Root of All Evilution (2015)

Professional ratings
Review scores
Source	Rating
Allmusic	3/5 stars

American Inquisition is the thirteenth studio album by the band Christian Death. The album was released on Season of Mist on October 15, 2007, worldwide, and on October 23, 2007, in USA and Canada in an exclusive digipak complete with embossing and spot lacquering. The catalogue number is SOM166.

It was previously thought that the next Christian Death album would be called Ten Excuses for Suicide as announced on the official site back in 2003, but this has proved not to be the case.

== Track listing ==
1. "Water into Wine" – 5:54
2. "Stop Bleeding on Me" – 4:00
3. "Narcissus Metamorphosis Of" – 5:38
4. "Victim X" – 5:50
5. "To Disappear" – 4:23
6. "Dexter Said No to Methadone" – 4:18
7. "Angels and Drugs" – 4:57
8. "Seduction Thy Destruction" – 5:06
9. "Worship Along the Nile" – 4:17
10. "See You in Hell" – 5:08
11. "Surviving Armageddon" – 5:34
12. "Last Thing" – 4:44
13. "XIII" – 9:50

== Personnel ==
- Valor Kand - vocals, guitars, acoustic strings, synths, drums, percussion
- Maitri - vocals, bass, percussion
- Nate Hassan - drums
- Tila - acoustic keyboards

Additional musicians

- Juan "Punchy" Gonzalez - power guitar on "Stop Bleeding on Me"
- Coyote - additional guitar on "Narcissus Metamorphosis Of"
- Adeline Bellart - French monologue
