= Damond Jiniya =

American singer

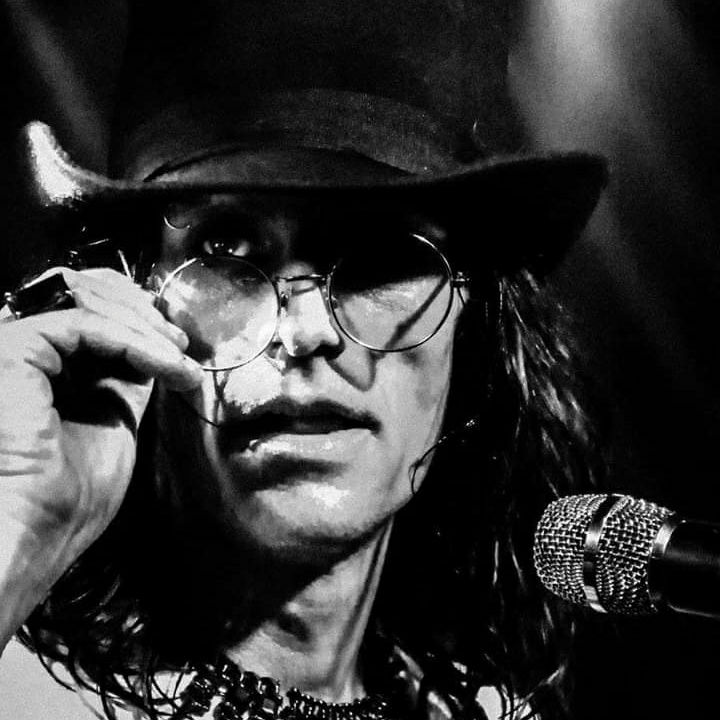
- Damond Jiniya 2022

Background information
- Born: Damond Micheal Jiniya; December 16, 1974 (age 51); Palm Springs, California, United States
- Origin: Palm Springs, USA
- Genres: Progressive metal, emo
- Occupations: author; musician; songwriter; influencer
- Instruments: vocals, guitar, piano
- Years active: 1978–present
- Website: http://www.earthstonespirit.com

Damond Jiniya is an American vocalist, lyricist and author. He was born December 16, 1974, in Palm Springs, California. He is known for his unique vocal abilities having been publicly compared to artists such as Jon Oliva, Jim Morrison, Rob Halford, and Prince. Damond achieved international notoriety in 1996 with his electro-metal pop band Diet of Worms. He briefly fronted metal band Savatage. He recorded with Lover of Sin (Christian Death) in 2005.

Damond has performed at festivals such as Wacken Open Air (DE), Graspop (BE), "Gods of Metal (IT) and the Dracfest UK. He has been featured worldwide in publications such as NME (U.K), Metal Edge (U.S.A), Rock Hard (DE), Metal Maniacs (U.S.A), Aardschok (NL) and most recently Roadie Crew (Brazil). Damond began his 20+ year career as a touring lighting director for the likes of Morbid Angel, Mayhem, and Monster Magnet, among other artists.

In early 2022, Damond published 2 full literary books. "Wandering Poems for Dreamers" and "Amerikan Family Ultra". 2026 will see Damond's 14th international music release "Pure Herman Nebula". Damond joined Louisville KY. U.S.A premiered regional rock band "Wicked Sensation" in January 2026.

== Early life ==
Damond was born in Palm Springs, California December 16, 1974. He comes from a family of performers. His grandmother, mother, sister and niece all sing professionally. His mother was a country singer. He joined his mother onstage at age 2 and became part of her show. His most notable talent is reportedly his 7.5 octave vocal range. He also plays 5 musical instruments.

Damond traveled the United States extensively with his Mother exclusively throughout most of his childhood, living in New Hampshire, Tennessee, Washington, Arizona, Nevada and Florida. He put together his first band at age 12 in Nashville, TN.

== Diet of Worms (1996–2004) ==
Damond founded Diet of Worms with guitarist, producer Juan "Punchy" Gonzalez in 1996. They recorded a demo entitled "Diet of Worms" The demo was well received by critics and fans alike. The duo quickly went on the road with acts such as Godhead, Mortiis, Switchblade Symphony and Christian Death touring the U.S., Canada, Mexico and Europe (1997–2003) DOW became a trio in 1998 adding Christian Death drummer Steven "Divine" Wright. The band played their last show in Haarlem, NL in 2003. Diet of Worms disbanded in 2004 citing personal differences. Damond began his touring career in 1995 as a lighting technician for Morbid Angel, Mayhem and Monster Magnet DOW recorded 3 studio albums and 1 EP.

== Savatage (2001–2003) ==
Damond joined Savatage in March 2001 after the departure of their former lead vocalist Zachary Stevens. Damond traveled extensively with Savatage to support their 2001 release Poets and Madmen. The band headlined in Europe, Brazil, and the U.S.A. They also played/headlined festivals with Suicidal Tendencies, Megadeth, W.A.S.P., Bruce Dickinson, Living Colour, Motörhead etc. In 2001 they opened for Judas Priest in Europe on their "Demolition" tour. There were immediate plans to record a follow up record, but Savatage went on indefinite hiatus in 2003 and the album was never recorded.

== Various projects (2005–present) ==
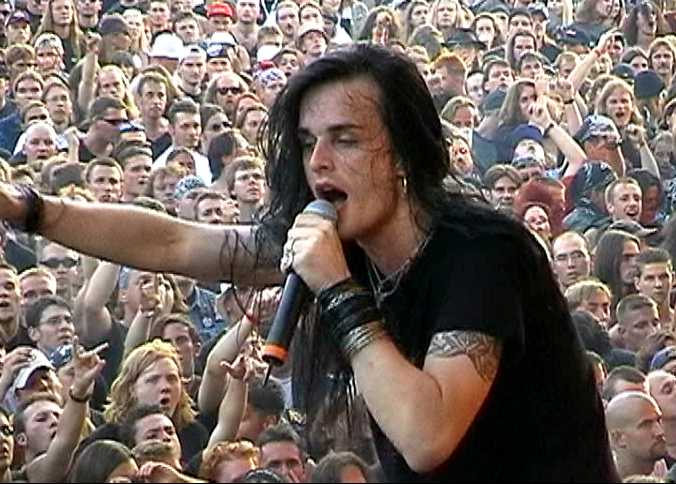
Jiniya in 2002

After his departure from Savatage in 2010, Damond briefly took up acting. He starred in a low-budget independent film called Chasing the Tiger with Jennifer Karnes. He released his fifth studio album called The Neglected in 2005. In 2006 Damond released "Starclone". In 2008 he released "Nebulas on Doomsday". Damond released his 8th international independent recording "Herman Nebula" in 2013.

Damond has been featured on blabbermouth.com, Roadie Crew, Metalsucks and Brave Words online. In a 2018 interview, he mentioned that he was working on two books, including a poetry/biography and a fictional piece. In 2018 he formed Blackbird Sanctuary Media. In 2019 he released two full-length recordings "Dreaming of Snakes" and "Down the Tracks" In 2020, he and his wife developed Earth Stone Spirit.com. This is a successful online everything store. In 2020 he celebrated 20 years as a successful vocal coach. In February 2022, Damond wrote and released his first book, Wandering Poems, worldwide.

In 2023 Damond was signed by legendary manager and mogul, David Krebs, from the famed William Morris Agency, where he booked Don McLean. Following his work with WMA, Krebs was co-manager of the New York Dolls, Aerosmith, AC/DC, The Scorpions, Ted Nugent, and Adam Bomb. He is rumored to be releasing his 14th international sound recording, "Pure," in 2026.

=== Books ===
- Wandering Poems (for Dreamers) (2021)
- American Family Ultra(2022)

=== Discography ===
- Diet of Worms (1996)
- To Thine Own Self (1997)
- Aquarius (1999)
- Tantrumland (2004)
- The Neglected (2005)
- Starclone (2006)
- Nebulas on Doomsday (2008)
- Herman/Nebula (2014)
- Fake New Flyers EP (2018)
- Down the Tracks (2020)
- Dreaming of Snakes (2021)
- Pure (2024)

=== Compilations ===
- Black Sunshine 2 (Cleopatra Records)
- 1er. Festival Oscuro (Dilemma Records MX)
