= All the Love All the Hate (Part Two: All the Hate) =

All the Hate

Studio album by Christian Death
- Released: 1989
- Genre: Gothic Metal , Deathrock , Heavy metal
- Label: Jungle Records, Normal Records
- Producer: Nick Farr, Valor Kand

Christian Death chronology
All the Love (1988)	All the Hate (1989)	Insanus, Ultio, Proditio, Misericordiaque (1990)

Singles from All the Hate
- 1. "I Hate You" Released: 1989

All the Hate is the eighth album by American deathrock band Christian Death, released in 1989 through Jungle Records. It is second part in the two part series All the Love All the Hate, its predecessor being All the Love. It was released in 1989 on vinyl, cassette and CD. While being available on plain black vinyl, it was also made available on brown coloured vinyl.

== Music and themes ==
With All the Love having a more poppier side to it, All the Hate is very heavy and angry and continues the deathrock sound they have established. However, this album has more heavy metal influences on it, and is generally a heavy album. "I Hate You" is a simple song which features Kands son, Seven Kand, singing the song, which contains him saying that he hates him. "Climate of Violence" is split into three parts: "The Relinquishment", "The Satanic Verses" and "A Malice of Prejudice". The song starts off with a quiet beautiful melody before Kand suddenly screams, and the music kicks in.

As the title suggests, the album is a concept album about hate. The album deals with the Nazis, proven by songs such as "Nazi Killer", and hate within children proven by "I Hate You".

== Track listing ==
1. "Born in a Womb, Died in a Tomb" – 4:42
2. "Baptised in Fire" – 4:58
3. "I Hate You" – 4:19
4. "Children of the Volley" – 3:09
5. "Kneel Down" – 5:35
6. "Climate of Violence" – 7:47
  "Part One: The Relinquishment"
  Part Two: "The Satanic Verses (Rushdie's Lament)"
  "Part Three: A Malice of Prejudice"
7. "The Final Solution" – 3:25
8. "Nazi Killer" – 5:45
9. "Man to Father Fire" – 5:19
