= The Eternal Afflict =

German darkwave/industrial band

- Also known as: Romantic Affliction
- Origin: Germany
- Genres: Electronic body music; darkwave
- Years active: 1989–present
- Labels: Glasnost; Scanner; Afflict:Me
- Members: Andrè Kampmann; Markus Borowski

The Eternal Afflict is a band from Essen, Germany, started in 1989.

== History ==
The band started as a collaboration between Markus Borowski ("Mark") and André Kampmann ("Cyan"). They released 3 demo tapes under the name Romantic Affliction. In 1991, they created their debut album Atroci(-me)ty, followed by the EP Luminographic. Both of these contain their best known and most popular track: San Diego. They performed at the first official Wave-Gotik-Treffen in 1992. In 1993 they released the album Trauma Rouge, followed by a supporting tour called The Trauma over Europe. 1994 saw the release of their album War on Gymnastic Records. The band broke up in 1995 due to internal strife, with Mark and Cyan concentrating on solo work such as Cyan Kills E.Coli. After a four year break, The Eternal Afflict published their best of album Nothing meant Forever in 1998. They also performed at the fourth Woodstage Summer Open Air festival in Glauchau. However, it was another five years before they finally got back together and produced a new album, Katharsis in 2003, with producer Winus Rilinger ("Winus") on board. They also performed at Wave-Gotik-Treffen 2003. This was followed by the album Black Heritage in 2004, which included cover versions of their favourite songs and one new track, Schwarz. In 2005, the band released Euphoric & Demonic, followed by a European tour and a 2 year break. The title track, Euphoric & Demonic, was on the Deutsche Alternative Charts for 7 weeks, peaking at #9.

== Discography ==
=== Albums ===
- Atroci(-me)ty (Glasnost Records, 1991)
- (Luminographic) Agony (Glasnost Records, 1992)
- Trauma Rouge (..Now Mind Revolution) (Glasnost Records, 1992)
- The Awakening (Glasnost Records, 1993)
- In Times Like These... (1993)
- War (Gymnastic Records, 1994)
- Katharsis (Scanner, 2003)
- Black Heritage (Scanner, 2004)
- Euphoric & Demonic (Scanner, 2005)
- [-ion] (Afflict:Me Records, 2009)

=== Singles and EPs ===
- San Diego 2K9 (feat Qntal) (Afflict Me, 2009)
