= Mephisto Walz =

American gothic rock band

- Origin: United States
- Genres: Gothic rock; ethereal wave; deathrock
- Years active: 1985–present
- Labels: Alice In..., Cleopatra, The Fossil Dungeon
- Members: Barry Galvin; Myriam Galvin
- Past members: Sara Reid; Johan Schumann; David Glass; William Coulter; Steven Greene; Christine Leonard
- Website: mephistowalz.com

Mephisto Walz is an American gothic rock band formed in 1986 by Barry Galvin (known as Bari-Bari) and John Schuman (known as Johann) after they departed from the deathrock band Christian Death.

== History ==
=== Christian Death ===
Barry Galvin (Bari-Bari) joined Christian Death as the bassist when Rozz Williams was the lead vocalist. After Williams left the band in 1985, guitarist Valor Kand took over as lead singer and became the principal songwriter.

Galvin, along with Barry Schuman and drummer David Glass, contributed to Christian Death’s 1985 album Atrocities, as well as the EPs The Wind Kissed Pictures and Believers of the Unpure. Galvin is credited with writing several tracks on Atrocities, including "Tales of Innocence," "Strapping Me Down," and "Silent Thunder."

The 1985 EP The Wind Kissed Pictures included Bari-Bari's compositions "The Wind Kissed Pictures" and "Lacrima Christi". The 1986 single Believers of the Unpure featured his song "Between Youth".

Bari-Bari and Johann departed Christian Death due to creative differences with Valor Kand.

=== 1986: Mephisto Walz's beginnings ===
Mephisto Walz was formed in Düsseldorf, West Germany, in February 1986. The founding lineup consisted of Galvin, Schuman (who named the band), a drummer known as Arndt, and a vocalist named Jörge. Their self-titled debut album was released the same year by the Italian label Supporti Fonografici.

In 1987, the band relocated to Los Angeles; Johann did not join them. In 1988, Bari-Bari began collaborating with Steven Grey in Hollywood. They reformed the band with David Harmon (bass), Mondo (vocals), and Nariki Shimooka (guitar). This line-up performed material from the first EP and Bari-Bari's songs from Christian Death, while also developing new material that would later appear on the Crocosmia, Terra-Regina, and Thalia releases. Material that became Rarities 1989 was recorded live in the studio during this period.

=== 1991: New vocalist and tour ===
In 1991, Christine Leonard (Christianna) joined as vocalist. Bari-Bari stated his reason for introducing a female vocalist was that the "male vocals sounded too similar to Williams and Christian Death". The band began working with Gymnastic Records, appearing on the compilation American Gothic with the song "Tangia". Crocosmia was subsequently recorded for European release, featuring both new tracks and older songs re-recorded with Christianna on vocals.

In 1992, a co-headlining tour with Shadow Project took Mephisto Walz back to Germany. The band remained there to record As Apostles Forget. Bari-Bari also wrote material intended for Terra-Regina and Thalia before returning to the U.S.

Upon returning to Los Angeles, Johann and Glass rejoined the band, replacing William Faith and Steven Grey. Bari-Bari and Christianna then commenced work on three full-length albums: Eternal Deep, Terra-Regina, and Thalia, which were released through Cleopatra Records.

=== 1994-1999: Covers and Nightingale ===
From 1994 to 1999, Bari-Bari and Christianna collaborated on cover singles for Cleopatra Records, in addition to releasing their albums "Early Recordings" and "Immersion."

They later recorded the "Nightingale" EP in 2002 for the Fossil Dungeon label, followed by their album "Insidious" in 2004.

For several years afterward, Bari-Bari was active performing and recording with the band Scarlet's Remains, while also recording other groups at his Los Angeles studio.

=== 2011-2017: IIIrd Incarnation, New Apostles, and Scoundrel ===
In 2011, "IIIrd Incarnation" was recorded, featuring Bari-Bari and Sara Reid on vocals. The album showcased a more aggressive guitar style.

Two years later, "New Apostles" was recorded, with Bari-Bari and Myriam Galvin on vocals. Christian Omar Madrigal Izzo performed drums on four tracks.

The 2017 release "Scoundrel" was written and recorded by Bari-Bari and Myriam Galvin, with Omar Madrigal Izzo again contributing drums on select songs.

== Discography ==
=== Albums and EPs ===
- 1992: Crocosmia (Compilation)
- 1992: As Apostles Forget (EP)
- 1993: Terra-Regina
- 1994: The Eternal Deep
- 1995: Thalia
- 1995: Mosaique (Compilation)
- 1998: Immersion
- 2000: Early Recordings 1985–1988 (Compilation)
- 2004: Insidious
- 2011: IIIrd Incarnation
- 2013: New Apostles
- 2017: Scoundrel
- 2018: Immersion II
- 2018: Rarities 1989 (Compilation)
- 2020: All These Winding Roads

=== Exclusive tracks appearing on compilations ===
- Gothik: Music from the Dark Side – "Mephisto Walz"
- Gothic Erotica – "Israel"
- Dancing on Your Grave – "Facade"
- Künstler Zum 13. Wave-Gotik-Treffen – "Before These Crimes"
- Sonic Seducer – Cold Hands Seduction Vol. 39 – "One Day Less"
- Strobe Lights Vol. 2 – "Hunter's Trail (Strobe Light Mix)"
- Kaliffornian Deathrock – "Eternal Deep"
- Virgin Voices - "Skin" (Madonna cover)
- Gothic Daydreams - "One Less Day"
