= Catastrophe Ballet =

Studio album by Christian Death
- Released: 1984
- Recorded: 1983–1984
- Genre: Gothic rock Deathrock
- Label: Contempo
- Producers: Eric Westfall; Valor Kand; Rozz Williams

Christian Death chronology
Only Theatre of Pain (1982)	Catastrophe Ballet (1984)	Ashes (1985)

Catastrophe Ballet is the second studio album by American rock band Christian Death. It was released in 1984, through record label Contempo.

Besides founder Rozz Williams, the lineup on the album is completely different from the band's debut, Only Theatre of Pain, and is the first record to feature future band leader Valor Kand. This and the follow-up record Ashes would be the final releases to feature Williams before his departure in mid 1985.

== Content ==
Catastrophe Ballet, featured a change in Williams' vocal delivery. While Only Theatre of Pain and the Deathwish EP had Williams presenting a rhythmic spoken word style with an almost androgynous pitch to his voice, Catastrophe Ballet showed a richer, less harsh side to his vocal stylings, with more influence from David Bowie and Lou Reed. Rather than the occult-oriented lyrics from the first album, the singer showed a new-found interest in Surrealism and the Dada movement. Kand, Demone and Glass shared these interests, and the synergy between them helped cultivate the musical change from the old band's murky, dark punk to a more elegant, romantic strain of guitar-driven rock, though a tribalistic drumming was also added into the mix.

=== Album cover ===
The popular front cover art of this album was by Serge Burner of the Invitation Au Suicide label staff.

== Reception ==
Professional ratings
Review scores
Source	Rating
AllMusic	4/5 stars
Trouser Press	favorable

Trouser Press described the album as "a gem" and "goth that can afford to take itself seriously".

== Track listing ==
- Arranged by Valor. All songs copyright QAH Music U.S.A.
1. "Awake at the Wall" (Music-Williams-Demone-Valor, Lyrics-Williams)
2. "Sleepwalk" (Music-Williams & Valor, Lyrics-Williams)
3. "The Drowning" (Music & Lyrics-Williams)
4. "The Blue Hour" (Music-Williams & Valor, Lyrics-Williams)
5. "As Evening Falls" (Music-Williams & Valor, Lyrics-Williams)
6. "Androgynous Noise Hand Permeates" (Music-Valor & Parkinson)
7. "Electra Descending" (Music-Williams & Valor, Lyrics-Williams)
8. "Cervix Couch" (Music-Williams-Demone-Valor, Lyrics- Williams)
9. "This Glass House" (Music-Williams & Valor, Lyrics-Williams)
10. "The Fleeing Somnambulist" (Music-Williams & Valor)

== Re-releases ==
The album was re-released in 1987 as A Catastrophe Ballet with Rhapsody of Youth and Rain with three bonus tracks:

1. "The Somnolent Pursuit" ("The Fleeing Somnabulist" backwards)
2. "Between Youth" (B-side track from Believers of the Unpure)
3. "After the Rain" (B-side track from Believers of the Unpure)

In 1999 it was released with live recordings of "Awake at the Wall" and "The Drowning" and a CD-Rom track with pictures.

In 2009, the album was re-released once more with an unreleased studio track entitled "Beneath His Widow" featuring Rozz Williams.

== Personnel ==
- Rozz Williams – lead vocals
- Valor Kand – guitars, backing vocals
- Gitane Demone – keyboards, backing vocals
- Constance Smith – bass
- David Glass – drums

Production

- Eric Westfall – production, recording, engineering
- Rozz Williams – production
