= Worms as food =

Worms as food can refer to:

- annelids as food;
- insects as food;
  - mealworm as food, a beetle larva;
  - mopane worm as food, a caterpillar;
  - sago worm as food, a beetle larva;
  - silkworm as food, a caterpillar;
- shipworm as food, a mollusc.

== See also ==
- Buffalo worm
- Maguey worm
- Mezcal worm
- Food for Worms
