= Sex and Drugs and Jesus Christ =

Studio album by Christian Death
- Released: 18 October 1988
- Recorded: 1988
- Genre: Gothic rock
- Label: Nostradamus; Jungle; Cleopatra
- Producer: Valor

Christian Death chronology
The Scriptures (1987)	Sex and Drugs and Jesus Christ (1988)	All The Love (1989)

Professional ratings
Review scores
Source	Rating
AllMusic	2/5 stars
Metal Storm	8.6/10
Trouser Press	unfavourable

Sex and Drugs and Jesus Christ is the sixth album by American deathrock band Christian Death. It was released on 18 October 1988.

== Content ==
=== Album cover ===
The cover artwork for Sex and Drugs and Jesus Christ has incited controversy. It depicts an image of Jesus Christ in a self-made tourniquet, injecting heroin.

According to Jungle Records' website, the artwork affected the band, leading to a cancellation of shows in Boston. The website claims the artwork was censored in NME and Melody Maker magazine, with the NME rating it a 1 out of 10, saying "may the good lord strike them down."

== Release ==
Released on 18 October 1988, Sex and Drugs and Jesus Christ is reportedly Christian Death's highest selling album from the 1980s.

== Reception ==
Trouser Press described the record as "awful", "rudimentary" and "barely musical".

== Track listing ==
1. "This Is Heresy" - 4:21
2. "Jesus Where's the Sugar" - 3:14
3. "Wretched Mankind" - 4:24
4. "Tragedy" - 04:09
5. "Third Antichrist" - 10:21
6. "Erection" - 5:23
7. "Ten Thousand Hundred Times" - 4:42
8. "Incendiary Lover" - 3:01
9. "Window Pain" - 9:15

CD version contains the additional song "Tragedy" as track 4.

== Personnel ==
- Valor Kand - vocals, guitar, violin, piano
- Gitane Demone - vocals, keyboards
- Kota - bass
- Webz - drums
