= Only Theatre of Pain =

Studio album by Christian Death
- Released: March 24, 1982
- Genre: Deathrock
- Length: 32:20
- Label: Frontier
- Producers: Christian Death; Thom Wilson

Christian Death chronology
Only Theatre of Pain (1982)	Deathwish (1984)

Alternative cover
- Alternative Only Theatre of Pain cover used for L'Invitation Au Suicide publishings in France.

Only Theatre of Pain is the debut studio album by the American rock band Christian Death, released on March 24, 1982, by the Frontier record label.

It is considered by most critics to be the harbinger of the deathrock style of music, as well as being highly influential on the American gothic music scene.

== Content ==
Describing the album's themes, The A.V. Club said the record is "relentless in its morbid embrace of Christian eschatology. Williams was raised in a Southern Baptist family, which makes his adversarial appropriation of Catholic imagery more nuanced than simple blasphemy; he’s approaching the cross from the perspective of both Protestantism and what one can only assume to be either atheism or Satanism".

== Critical reception ==
Professional ratings
Review scores
Source	Rating
AllMusic	4.5/5 stars
Record Collector	5/5 stars
Melody Maker	favourable
Sounds	(1982) (1983)
Trouser Press	generally favorable

Only Theatre of Pain was praised by critics on its release. Mick Mercer of Melody Maker called it the "gothic album to out-gothic all others".

Around the time of its release, a presenter on a religious TV program, in a special on "Satanic influences", reportedly broke a copy of the album on air.

In its retrospective review, Record Collector wrote, "Only Theatre of Pain's influence should not be underestimated." The A.V. Club wrote that, of the group's musical peers, "none had exemplified the nascent subgenre [gothic rock] with as much sinew, vision, and iconoclasm", calling it "a depraved masterpiece".

Alex Ogg, writing in The Rough Guide to Rock, was less favourable, calling the album "self-aggrandizing doom rock redeemed only by strong musicianship".

== Anniversary concert ==
On April 13, 2007, the remaining members of the Only Theatre of Pain line-up of Christian Death reunited as Christian Death 1334 to perform the album in full at the Henry Fonda Theatre in Los Angeles, California. The addition of "1334" to the end of the band's name was reportedly to make a distinction from the Valor Kand-led version of the band, which includes none of the group's original members; "1334" was also Rozz Williams' "signature number". At the time, it was reported by Blabbermouth that the band was working on new songs and was to begin the recording of a new album later in the year, but this never materialized.

== Track listing ==
All tracks are written by Rikk Agnew and Rozz Williams, except where noted.

Side one
No.	Title	Writer(s)	Length
1.	"Cavity – First Communion"		4:06
2.	"Figurative Theatre"	Rozz Williams	2:41
3.	"Burnt Offerings"		3:43
4.	"Mysterium Iniquitatis"		2:46
5.	"Dream for Mother"	Rikk Agnew; James McGearty; Williams	3:21

Side two
No.	Title	Writer(s)	Length
1.	"Stairs – Uncertain Journey"	McGearty; Williams	3:06
2.	"Spiritual Cramp"	Williams	2:55
3.	"Romeo's Distress"		3:15
4.	"Resurrection – Sixth Communion"		3:45
5.	"Prayer"		2:41
Total length:			32:20

1993 CD bonus tracks
No.	Title	Writer(s)	Length
11.	"Deathwish"	Agnew; George Belanger; McGearty; Williams	2:11
12.	"Romeo's Distress"		3:20
13.	"Dogs"	Agnew; Belanger; McGearty; Williams	2:52
14.	"Desperate Hell"	McGearty; Williams	4:22
15.	"Spiritual Cramp"	Williams	3:18
16.	"Cavity"		3:45
Total length:			52:08

== Personnel ==
Christian Death

- Rozz Williams – lead vocals, production, sleeve drawings, cover concept
- Rikk Agnew – guitars, production
- James McGearty – bass guitars, production
- George Belanger – drums, production

Additional personnel

- Eva O – backing vocals
- Ron Athey – backing vocals

Technical

- Thom Wilson – production
- Ed Colver – sleeve photography
