= Maitri (musician) =

Dutch musician

Maitri Nicolai
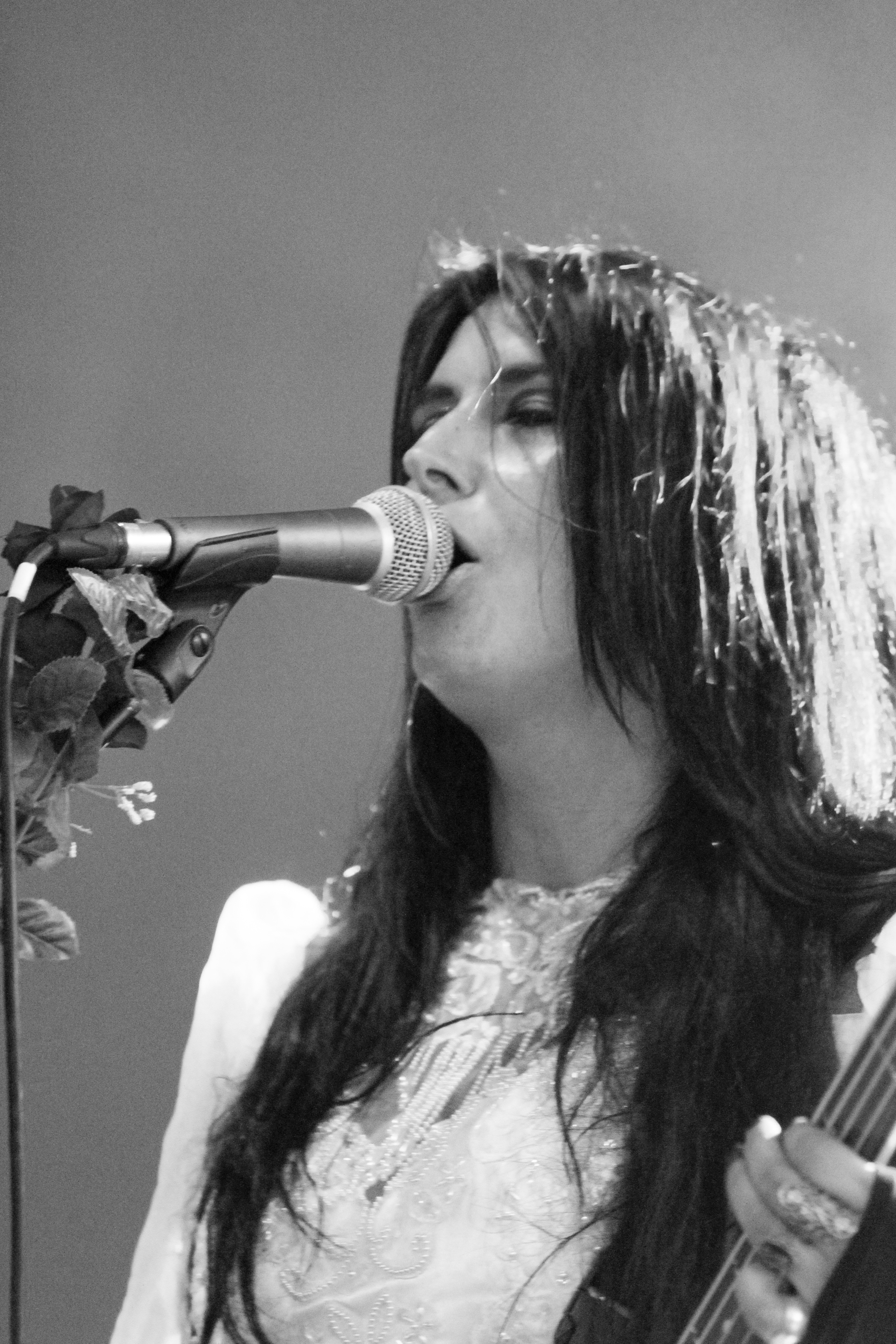
- Maitri performing at the Wave-Gotik-Treffen in Leipzig, Germany, 2014

Background information
- Born: Maitri Nicolai; Rotterdam, Netherlands
- Genres: Gothic rock; deathrock; black metal
- Occupations: Singer; songwriter; musician
- Instruments: Bass guitar; vocals
- Member of: Christian Death; Lover of Sin

Maitri Nicolai, known under her stage name Maitri, is a Dutch singer, songwriter and musician.

== Career ==
Maitri is best known as the bassist, songwriter, and female vocalist of the gothic rock band Christian Death. She joined the band in 1991, taking to the stage for her first performance at the Contemporary Festival, held at the Anfiteatro delle Cascine in Florence, Italy, on 12 July 1991. Maitri made her studio debut on the compilation album Jesus Points the Bone at You, performing on the new version of the track "The Nascent Virion", recorded especially for that collection. Maitri is also the lead vocalist and songwriter of the black metal band Lover of Sin.
