= Gitane DeMone =

American musician

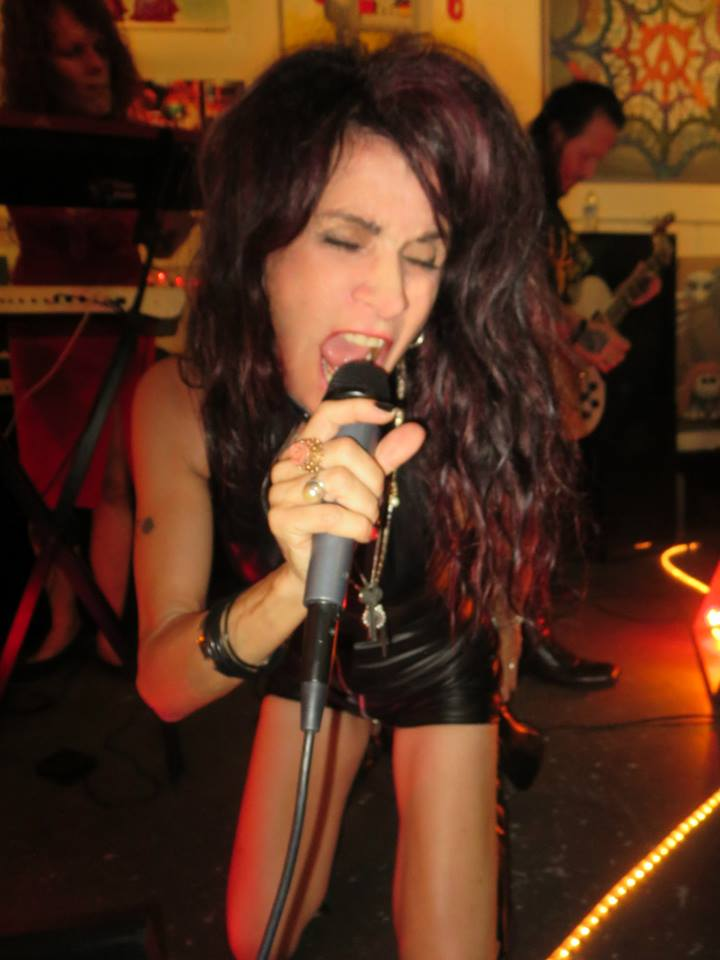
- DeMone performing

Background information
- Born: May 16, 1958 (age 68); San Francisco, California, U.S.
- Origin: Los Angeles, California, U.S.
- Genres: Death rock; gothic rock; experimental; dark cabaret; jazz
- Occupations: Singer; musician; songwriter
- Instruments: Vocals; piano
- Years active: 1981–present
- Labels: Torso Dance; Cleopatra; Cult; Hypnobeat; Triple X; Apollyon; Hollows Hill; EFA; Andromeda; Alone; Manic Depression; Mystic Moon

Gitane DeMone (also spelled Demone) is an American singer, musician and visual artist. Her career spans more than 30 years. She came to prominence in the mid-1980s as the keyboardist and backing vocalist of the influential death rock band Christian Death. In addition to her work with Christian Death, Demone was previously a member of Pompeii 99, worked with Dreadful Shadows, and has had a solo career which has included three studio albums: Am I Wrong?, Stars of Trash and The Reflecting Shadow.

== Early years ==
In high school, she discovered the works of Billie Holiday, and played and sang with local bands at parties. After high school, she became a writer and illustrator.

== Pompeii 99 ==
In 1981, DeMone placed an ad in The Recycler met Valor Kand, and began Pompeii 99. Kand was fascinated by Nostradamus and took the band name from a prophecy. Kand and DeMone found drummer David Glass through auditions, also working with members Marc Doten and Polly Klemmer.

Pompeii 99 gained an audience in the Los Angeles club scene, and in 1981, formed a record label, Nostradamus, to release their debut album Look at Yourself. In 1982, they followed this with an EP, Ignorance Is the Control. Pompeii 99 were scheduled to open for Christian Death on a European tour, but when that band's lineup collapsed, lead singer Rozz Williams decided along with Kand, DeMone and Glass to combine the two bands into a new version of Christian Death.

== Christian Death ==
The new lineup of Christian Death, including DeMone, went on to record two new albums, 1984's Catastrophe Ballet (with bassist Constance Smith) and 1985's Ashes (with bassist Randy Wilde).

In mid-1985, after Williams left, Kand took over leadership of the band, working as lead vocalist and songwriter. With bassist Johann Schumann and guitarist/keyboardist Barry Galvin, the band recorded an EP for the Italian label Supporti Fonografici titled The Wind Kissed Pictures, credited to "The Sin and Sacrifice of Christian Death". The EP was later reissued in Germany and the U.S., credited only to Christian Death.

The band's first post-Williams album was 1986's Atrocities, a concept album about the aftereffects of World War II on the European psyche. This was followed by 1987's The Scriptures, recorded by a revamped lineup of Kand, DeMone, Glass, guitarist James Beam and bassist Kota. During this period, the band found their biggest successes on the UK Independent Chart with the 1987–89 singles "Sick of Love", "Church of No Return" and "Zero Sex" and the 1988 album Sex and Drugs and Jesus Christ. Following the release of the "Zero Sex" single, Demone split from both Kand and Christian Death in 1989.

== Solo career ==
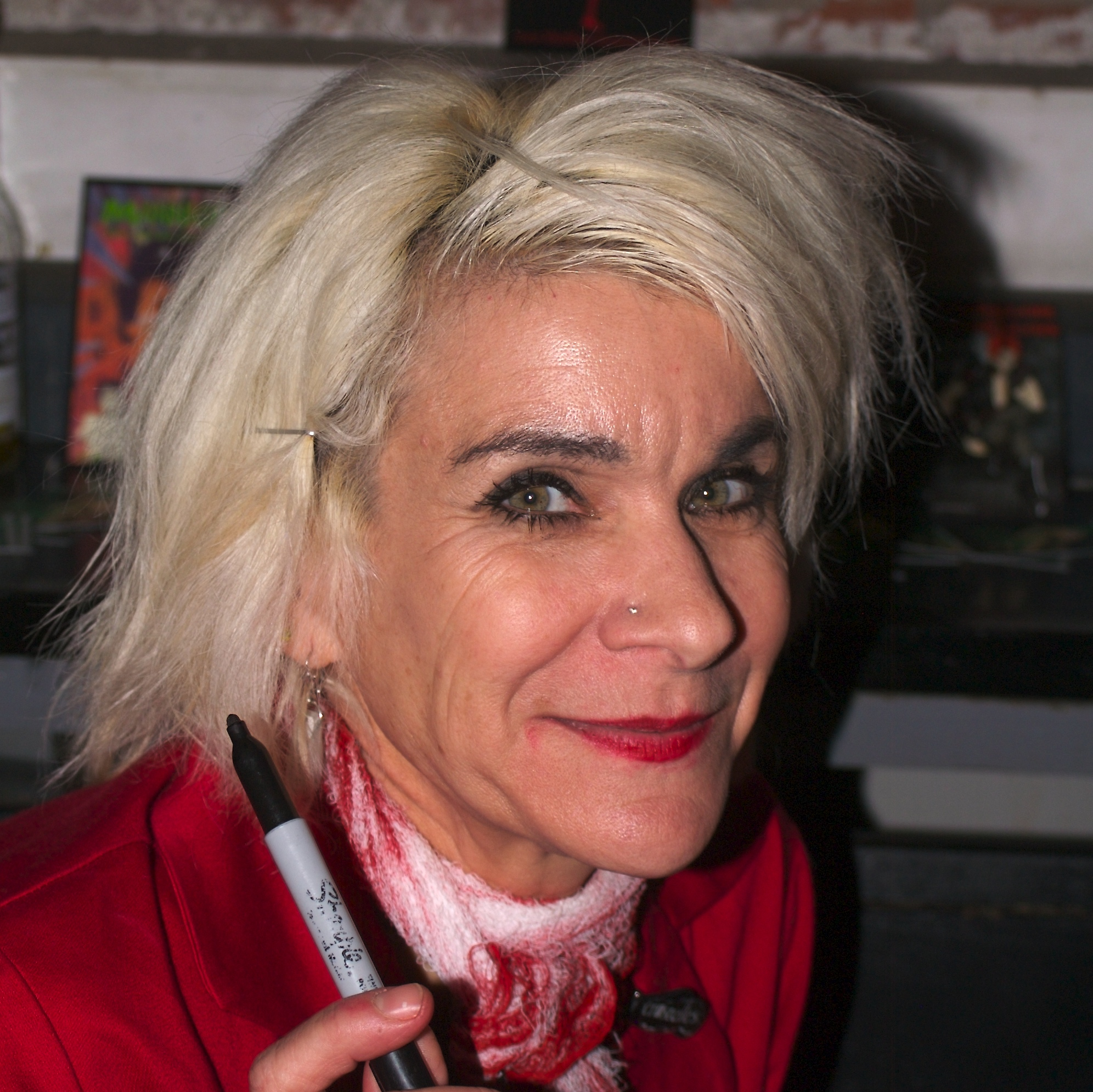
DeMone in 2007

In 1989, DeMone relocated to Amsterdam and began a solo career, combining her background in punk, death rock and gothic rock with a passion for jazz and legendary female vocalists, most notably Billie Holiday. She maintained a rubber-clad S&M visual image, and the fetish theme carried through into her lyrics.

DeMone's first two solo releases, the "A Heavenly Melancholy" maxi-single (1992, Torso Dance) and Lullabies for a Troubled World EP (1993, Cult Music), were collected, along with some 1993 live tracks, as the 1993 Cleopatra Records compilation Facets in Blue. She also issued two live albums during this period: Love for Sale (1993, Cult Music) and With Love & Dementia (Live in Cannes 1994) (1995, Hypnobeat).

She renewed her friendship with former Christian Death band member Williams, and the pair toured together and recorded the album Dream Home Heartache in 1995, which included both cover versions and their own material. DeMone then paired up with Mark Ickx to produce a studio album Never Felt So Alive, released in 1994; it was reissued under the title Demonix in 1996 by Cleopatra.

In 1996, DeMone recorded her first studio album Am I Wrong?, released by Apollyon in 1998. The following year she released a second studio album Stars of Trash (Andromeda), composed by DeMone and recorded with the assistance of the band Dreadful Shadows.

In 2008, a two-disc DVD by DeMone titled Life After Death was released by Cult Epics, featuring footage from throughout her career, including a live performance with Williams. From 2008 to 2011, DeMone was involved in a project called the Crystelles with daughter Zara Kand, and also performed with the experimental noise band +DOG+.

In 2013, she collaborated with Loopool and Syphilis Sauna under the name Hedone Tears, self-releasing a digital single, "Moonlit Paradise". "Moonlit Paradise", backed by an untitled track, was released again in 2015 as the Hedone Tears 7" single (Mystic Moon Records), under her own name.

As the Gitane DeMone Quartet, DeMone currently records and performs backed by other musicians including Rikk Agnew, Paul Roessler (The Screamers, etc.) and Deb Venom.

A published writer, DeMone's other artistic activities also include composing poetry and painting.

== Personal life ==
Besides being partners in Pompeii 99, DeMone and Kand were married in 1983. They had a son and daughter together. DeMone became engaged to fellow former Christian Death member Rikk Agnew on May 3, 2013.

== Discography ==
- "A Heavenly Melancholy" single (1992)
- Lullabies for a Troubled World EP (1993)
- Facets of Blue (1993 – compilation of previous EPs)
- Love for Sale (1993 – Live in Bern)
- Never Felt So Alive (1994 – as Demonix)
- With Love & Dementia (Live in Cannes 1994) (1995)
- Dream Home Heartache (1995 – as Rozz Williams and Gitane DeMone)
- The Happy Hour (1997 – with the Alpha Project)
- Am I Wrong? (1998)
- The Cycle (1999 – with Dreadful Shadows)
- Life in Death '85-'89 (1999 – collection of the Christian Death songs she sang)
- Never Felt So Alive (The Lost Mixes) (1999 – as Demonix)
- Stars of Trash (1999)
- "Solitary War" CD single (2000)
- Life After Death DVD (2008)
- Attach and Detach (2010 – with The Crystelles)
- "Moonlit Paradise" digital single (2013 – with Hedone Tears)
- The Reflecting Shadow (2013)
- Hedone Tears 7" (2015)
- Standard Upright digital single (2015 – Gitane DeMone Quartet)
- Past the Sun (2015 – Gitane DeMone Quartet)
- Substrata Strip (2018 – Gitane DeMone Quartet)
- The New Young Kings of Midnight (2023 – with Paul Roessler)
- Despair - The Opera 4 LP set(2024 – with N)
