= Valor Kand =

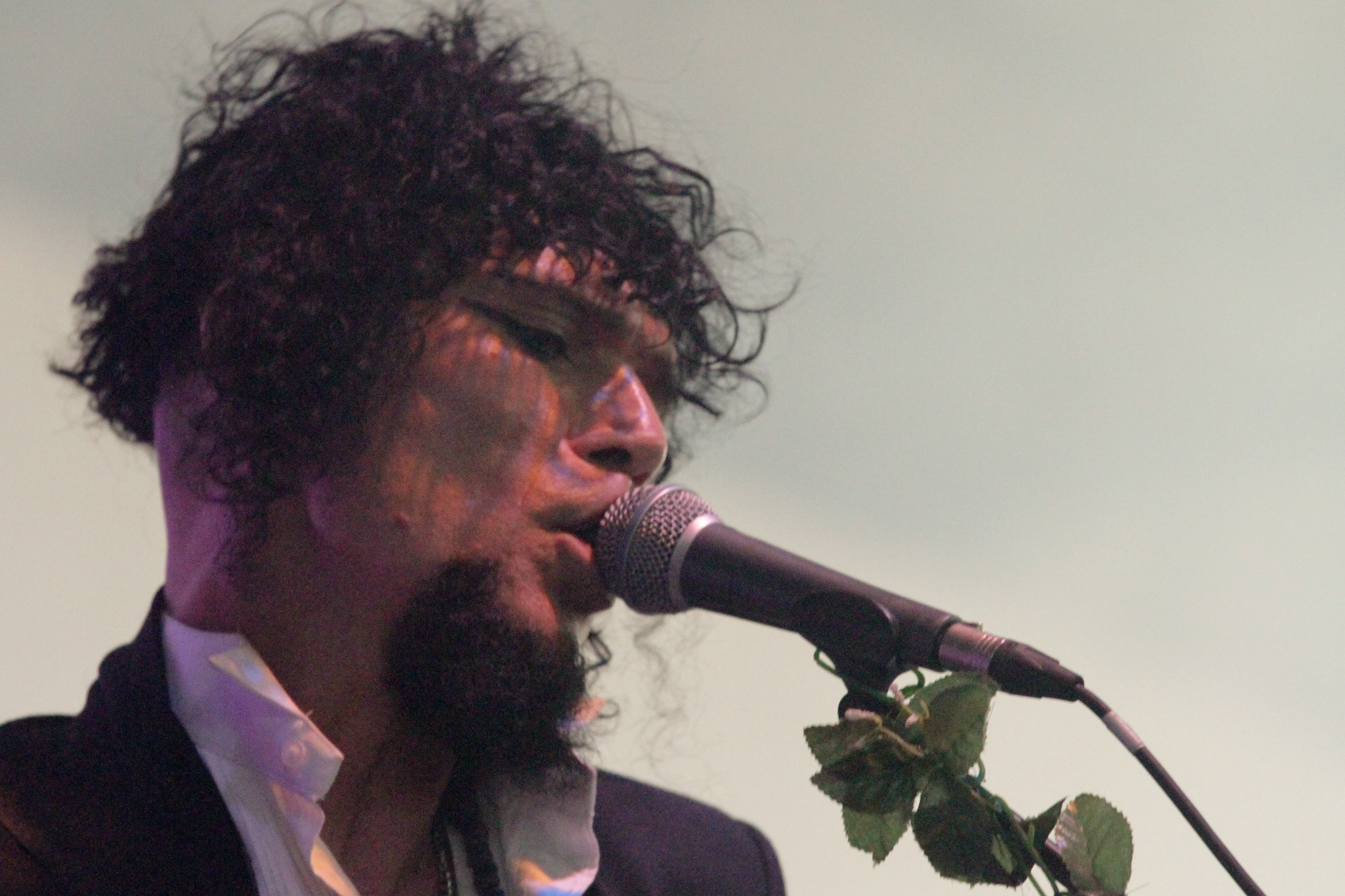
- Kand performing at the Wave-Gotik-Treffen in Leipzig, Germany, 2014

Background information
- Genres: Death rock; gothic rock; classical; ambient
- Occupations: Singer; guitarist; songwriter
- Instruments: Vocals; guitar; keyboards; bass; drums; percussion; violin; viola; cello
- Member of: Christian Death; Lover of Sin
- Formerly of: Pompeii 99

Valor Kand is a singer, guitarist and songwriter best known for his involvement with Christian Death, an American death rock and gothic rock band.

== Early years ==
Kand started his music career as a drummer, but "...had to progress to other instruments as time went by just to create the sounds I wanted to hear, whether that be keyboards, or horns, or guitars, or anything I could put my hands on."

== Pompeii 99 ==
In 1981, aspiring vocalist Gitane DeMone placed an ad in Los Angeles newspaper The Recycler saying, "female vocalist available." The ad was answered by Kand, who had recently graduated from high school. The pair formed the post-punk band Pompeii 99. Kand was fascinated by Nostradamus and took the band's name from a prophecy. Kand and DeMone found drummer David Glass (aka David Parkinson) through auditions and also worked with members Cram Netod (Marc Doten) and Poli-Sci (Polly Klemmer).

Pompeii 99 gained an audience in the L.A. club scene, and released their 1981 debut studio album, Look at Yourself on their own Nostradamus label, which was financed in part by their parents. In 1982, they followed this with a 7-inch EP, Ignorance Is the Control. Pompeii 99 was scheduled to open for Christian Death on a European tour, but when the band's line-up collapsed, leader Rozz Williams decided along with Kand, DeMone and Glass to combine the two bands into a new version of Christian Death.

== Christian Death ==
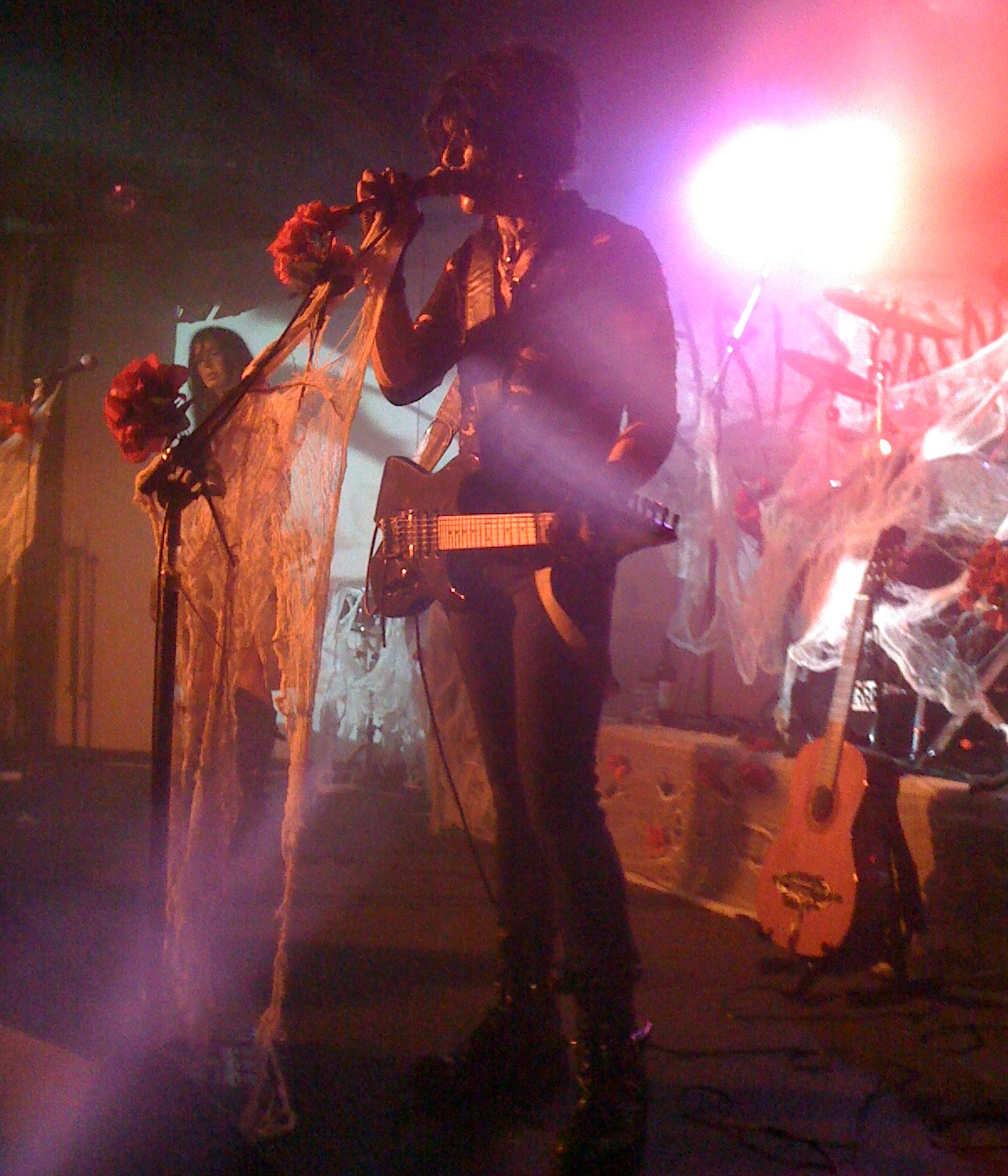
Christian Death performing live in 2010

Kand stayed with the band when it joined with Williams in 1983 to become the new line-up of Christian Death. The band went on to record their next two studio albums, 1984's Catastrophe Ballet with bassist Constance Smith and 1985's Ashes with bassist Randy Wilde.

In mid-1985, Kand took over leadership of the band after Williams left, working as lead vocalist and songwriter. With bassist Johann Schumann and guitarist and keyboardist Barry Galvin, the band recorded an EP for the Italian label Supporti Fonografici called The Wind Kissed Pictures, credited to "The Sin and Sacrifice of Christian Death". The EP was later reissued in Germany and the U.S., credited only to Christian Death.

The band's first studio album post-Williams release was 1986's Atrocities, a concept album about the aftereffects of World War II on the European psyche. This was followed by 1987's The Scriptures, recorded by a revamped line-up of Kand, DeMone, Glass, guitarist James Beam and bassist Kota. During this period, the band found their biggest successes on the UK Indie Chart with the 1987–89 singles "Sick of Love", "Church of No Return" and "Zero Sex" and the 1988 studio album Sex and Drugs and Jesus Christ. Following release of the "Zero Sex" single, DeMone split from both Kand and Christian Death in 1989.

In the early 1990s, Williams attempted to reclaim the Christian Death name. However, Kand already had the rights to the name due to Williams' departure from the group and subsequent neglect of the moniker. Williams billed his version of the band as "Christian Death featuring Rozz Williams". Williams died by suicide on April 1, 1998, after his close friend and associate Erik Christides died of an overdose.

Valor continued performing and recording with Christian Death, issuing the two-part concept work All the Love, All the Hate in 1989 and the 1990 studio album Insanus, Ultio, Proditio, Misercordiaque, on which Kand conducted the English Abbey Choir and the Commonwealth Chamber Orchestra. The band added bassist Maitri in 1991. Her first concert with Christian Death took place at the Contemporary Festival, held at the Anfitheatro delle Cascine in Florence, Italy on 12 July 1991. The band released the Sexy Death God studio album in 1994, the double-live set Amen in 1995, the Nostradamus-themed Prophecies in 1996, and Pornographic Messiah in 1998. In 2000, the band added drummer Will Sarginson and toured Europe with Britain's Cradle of Filth in support of their Born Again Anti Christian studio album.

In 2002, Valor produced an album by Maitri, black metal and death rock band Lover of Sin, releasing the studio album Lover of Sin.

For Christian Death's 2003 tour, they added Cradle of Filth guitarist Gian Peres to the line-up. In 2007, the band released the American Inquisition studio album, featuring new drummer Nate Hassan. In 2014, Christian Death embarked on the 30th Anniversary Catastrophe Ballet tour, beginning in Europe and continuing through to the year's end in North, South and Central America. In August 2015, the band released the PledgeMusic album The Root of All Evilution.

== Personal life ==
Kand is an ex-lover of Gitane DeMone, with whom he had two children. Williams was their godfather.
