= The Recycler =

American defunct newspaper company

- Type: Biweekly newspaper
- Format: Berliner
- Founder(s): Gunter and Nancy Schaldach
- Publisher: Stefanie Unland
- Deputy editor: William Roszczyk
- Associate editor: Katherine Fernelius
- Managing editor: Stefanie Unland
- Founded: July 1973
- Language: English
- Headquarters: 303 N. Glenoaks Blvd. #L105
- City: Burbank, California
- Country: United States
- Circulation: 540,000
- Price: £120,000
- ISSN: 0458-3035 (print); 2045-2047 (web)
- OCLC number: 50550085
- Website: recycler.com

The Recycler was a U.S. newspaper first published, in July 1973, under the name E-Z Buy E-Z Sell by the Canadians Gunter and Nancy Schaldach after they moved to Los Angeles, California, and modeled after a similar publication in Vancouver.

It started as a biweekly, mimeographed, 16-page publication. The intention was to sell the paper for 25 cents, but most of the initial 15,000 copies were given away for free. "At the beginning it was kind of a chicken-egg thing," recalled John Dorman, who joined the operation in 1974. "People would buy it to get access to advertising, but there weren't very many ads. But we had to sell papers to get ads."

The name was changed to The Recycler to capitalize on the popularity of recycling in the early 1970s.

By 1975, the paper had become profitable, and started being published weekly. The sale of display ads became an important source of revenue, and the company was able to hire its first full-time salesperson.

By the 1980s, The Recycler was published in seven editions, covering L.A., the San Fernando Valley, the South Bay, the San Gabriel Valley, Orange County, San Diego and the Inland Empire.

In 1988, the paper was sold in over 6,000 stores, and had a weekly readership of more than 540,000. By then, the company had more than 200 employees, plus another 120 who worked for McDuck Distribution. Single copies of the paper retailed for 55 cents to $1.25, depending on the edition. A sister publication, Photo Buys Weekly, which featured ads accompanied by a photograph, was started in 1982.

The publication was bought by the Los Angeles Times in 1997. They came in, cleaned the house of managers and employees, and destroyed the family environment for which the Recycler classifieds were known.

The Recycler classified newspaper helped launch the careers of many Los Angeles bands, including X, Dead Kennedys, The Bangles, Guns N' Roses, Metallica, Mötley Crüe, and Hole. The company was sold by the Los Angeles Times to Target Media Partners in 2007 is now located in North Hollywood, California. The Recycler was relaunched in 2010 as a website.

The Recycler closed operations as of November 2025, posting the following message on its website: "After five decades of serving our incredible customers in Southern California, we have made the difficult decision to close down Recycler.com."

== Influence on music ==
John Doe and Billy Zoom both responded to each others advertisements that they had placed in the magazine, founding X in 1977. James Hetfield responded to an advertisement in the magazine written by Lars Ulrich, founding Metallica. Mick Mars entered Mötley Crüe after Nikki Sixx responded to an advertisement Mick placed in the magazine that read, "Loud, rude, and aggressive guitarist available." Slash answered an ad in The Recycler to join Guns N' Roses from Izzy Stradlin. Eric Erlandson responded to an advertisement created by Hole frontwoman Courtney Love in 1989: "I want to start a band. My influences are Big Black, Sonic Youth, and Fleetwood Mac." Dead Kennedys formed in 1978 after vocalist Eric Boucher responded to an advertisement placed in The Recycler by guitarist Raymond Pepperell.
