= Christian Death =

American gothic rock band

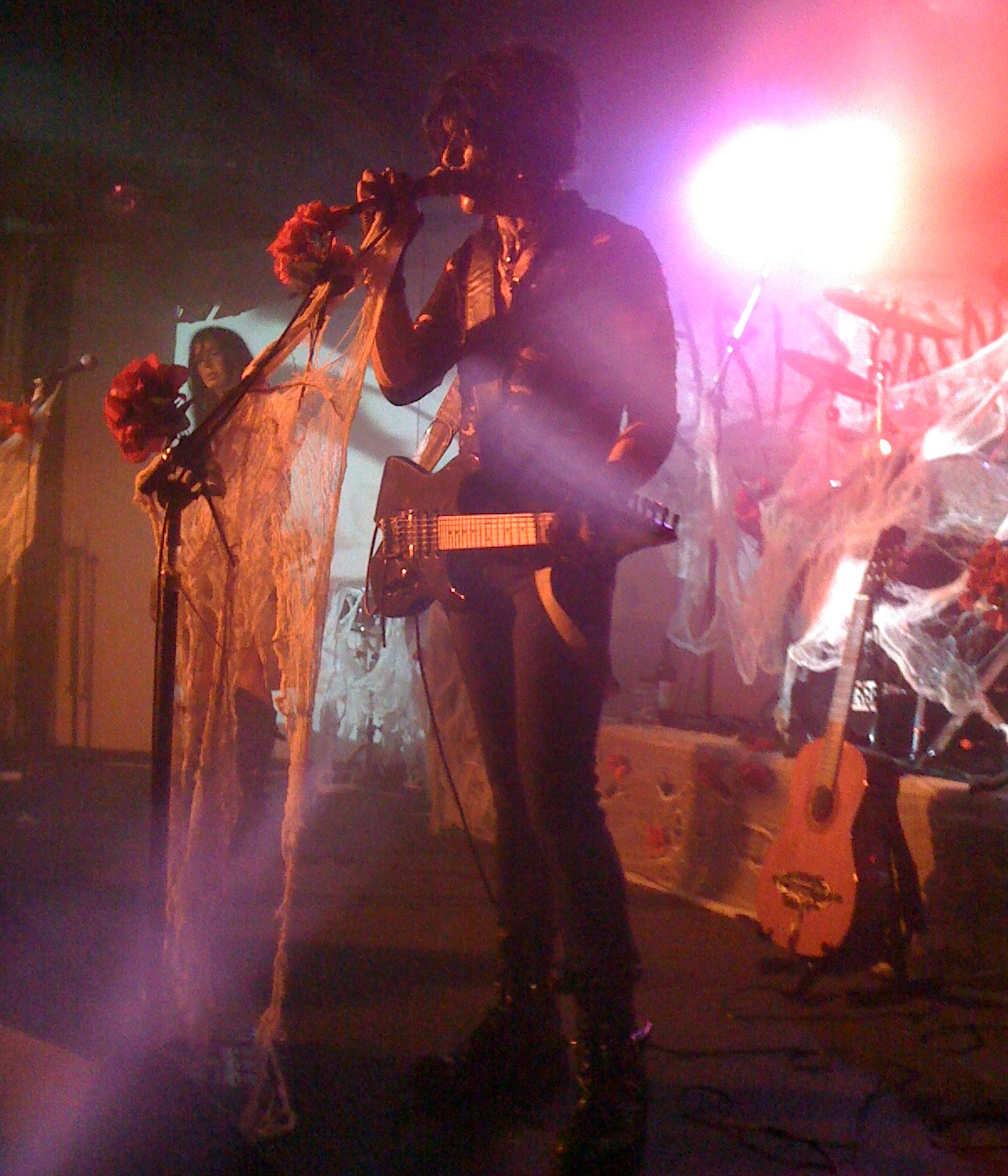
- Christian Death performing live in 2010. Left to right: Maitri, Valor Kand

Background information
- Also known as: Sin and Sacrifice
- Origin: Los Angeles County, California, U.S.
- Genres: Gothic rock; deathrock; art punk
- Years active: 1979–1982, 1983–present
- Labels: Frontier; L'Invitation au Suicide; ROIR; Nostradamus; Cleopatra; Normal; Jungle; Contempo; Century Media; Sad Eyes/Trinity; Candlelight; Season of Mist
- Members: Valor Kand; Maitri; Jason Frantz
- Past members: Rozz Williams; John "Jay" Albert; James McGearty; Hugh Jarse; George Belanger; Rikk Agnew; Mikaleno Amundson; China Figueroa; Michael Montano; Gitane DeMone; Voxx Voltair; David Glass; Constance Smith; Randy Wilde; Barry Galvin; Johann Schumann; Johnnie Sage; James Beam; Kota; PJ Phillips; Nick the Bastard; Vic De Boer; Ian Thompson; Casey Chaos; Eva O; David Melford; William Faith; Stevyn Grey; Kris Kohls; Steven "Devine" Wright; Alex X; Flick Fuck; Will Sarginson; Nate Hassan; Tiia; Gian Peres; Sean Franks; Paris Sadonis
- Website: officialchristiandeath.com

Christian Death is an American rock band formed in Claremont, California, in 1979 by Rozz Williams, John "Jay" Albert, James McGearty and George Belanger. It was during this period that much of the writing was done for what would become their early songs. With major line-up changes over the years, Christian Death has retained "a relentlessly confrontational stand against organized religion and conventional morality".

Williams was eventually joined by guitarist Rikk Agnew of the band Adolescents, James McGearty on bass guitar and George Belanger on drums. This line-up was responsible for producing the band's best known work, their 1982 debut studio album Only Theatre of Pain, which was highly influential in the development of the style of music known as deathrock, as well as on the American gothic scene which also produced bands such as Kommunity FK and 45 Grave.

Following the release of Only Theatre of Pain, Christian Death's line-up fell apart, and by the time of the band's second studio album, Catastrophe Ballet (1984), Rozz had been joined by Valor Kand of tour mates Pompeii 99 on vocals and guitar. Following the release of the band's third studio album, Ashes, in 1985, Williams left the band and Kand became frontperson, with no original members of the band remaining. This resulted in a divide in the band's fanbase and created controversy that has continued to this day.

== History ==
=== Formation and Only Theatre of Pain (1979–1982) ===
Guitarist John "Jay" Albert, vocalist Rozz Williams, bassist James McGearty and drummer George Belanger formed Christian Death in October 1979. At this time, the band was a punk rock band musically indebted to the Germs. As the band progressed their music slowed and began to incorporate religious symbolism. Their first live performance was an impromptu set at the Hong Kong Cafe in Los Angeles supporting Castration Squad, replacing Killer Pussy after they were booed off stage.

After a physical altercation involving Belanger took place, he was left unable to play drums for their upcoming show on February 14, 1981. Williams asked Steve Darrow to fill in, however Belanger decided moments before their set to still try and play, leading to Belanger performing the first few songs then Darrow finishing the set. This incident angered Albert, who left the band permanently mid-set. Subsequently, Christian Death was halted, with Albert and Williams forming noise band Daucus Karota with drummer Mary Torcivia. Williams, McGearty and Belanger regrouped a few months later, now accompanied by guitarist Rikk Agnew, who had just left the Adolescents. With this lineup, they made their first vinyl appearance with the song "Dogs" on the 1981 L.A. scene compilation album Hell Comes to Your House. The following year, they signed with Frontier Records and released their debut studio album, Only Theatre of Pain, on March 24.

The following year Belanger left the band after becoming disheartened by the growing darkness of the band's image and increasing drug abuse. Belanger's role was filled by Rod "China" Figueroa, whose first performance with the band was a record signing on April 10, 1982. Later that year, while the band were getting ready for a domestic tour, Agnew, distressed by his own drug use and troubles in his relationship, began to experience panicked episodes where he would imagine Williams and his boyfriend Ron Athey being subject to homophobic attacks in Southern states and the band being arrested for drug possession. This culminated in him leaving the band as they were preparing to go on stage. The band then hired Mikaleno Amundson to play guitar, who moved in with Figueroa. However, when Amundson and Figueroas' girlfriends fell out with each other, Amundson was forced to move out and leave the band after "about three to five shows." Because of this, Eva O briefly became the band's guitarist. On October 30, 1982, this lineup opened for Angelic Upstarts at SIR Studios alongside Pompeii 99. Following this, Michael Montano and Johnnie Sage both began playing guitar in the band, and they played again with Pompeii 99. By the end of the year, McGearty had left the band. With Williams as the only founding member remaining, Christian Death disbanded.

=== Reformation, Catastrophe Ballet and Ashes (1983–1985) ===
Around this point, Pompeii 99 too were going through a number of lineup changes. Subsequently, six months after Christian Death's disbandment, Williams joined Pompeii 99, which at that time consisted of only guitarist and vocalist Valor Kand and drummer David "Glass" Parkinson. Under Williams' suggestion, the band's session keyboard player and Kand's partner Gitane DeMone officially joined the band. After Williams was approached by Yann Farcy of French record label L'Invitation au Suicide to record another Christian Death album and tour Europe, the band hired bassist Constance Smith (later Redgrave) and changed their name to Christian Death. This culminated in Christian Death's second studio album Catastrophe Ballet (1984). Recorded at Rockfield Studios in Monmouth, Wales, much of this album's instrumentals were written by Kand, with Williams contributing entirely to lyrics and partially to melody writing. It was a departure from the band's angry punk-influenced style and was dedicated to surrealist André Breton. While in France, Smith departed from the group due to a mental health struggle, being replaced by Dave Roberts of Sex Gang Children. In autumn 1984, the band returned to America and recorded Ashes, which was released the following year.

=== Valor Kand era (1985–present) ===
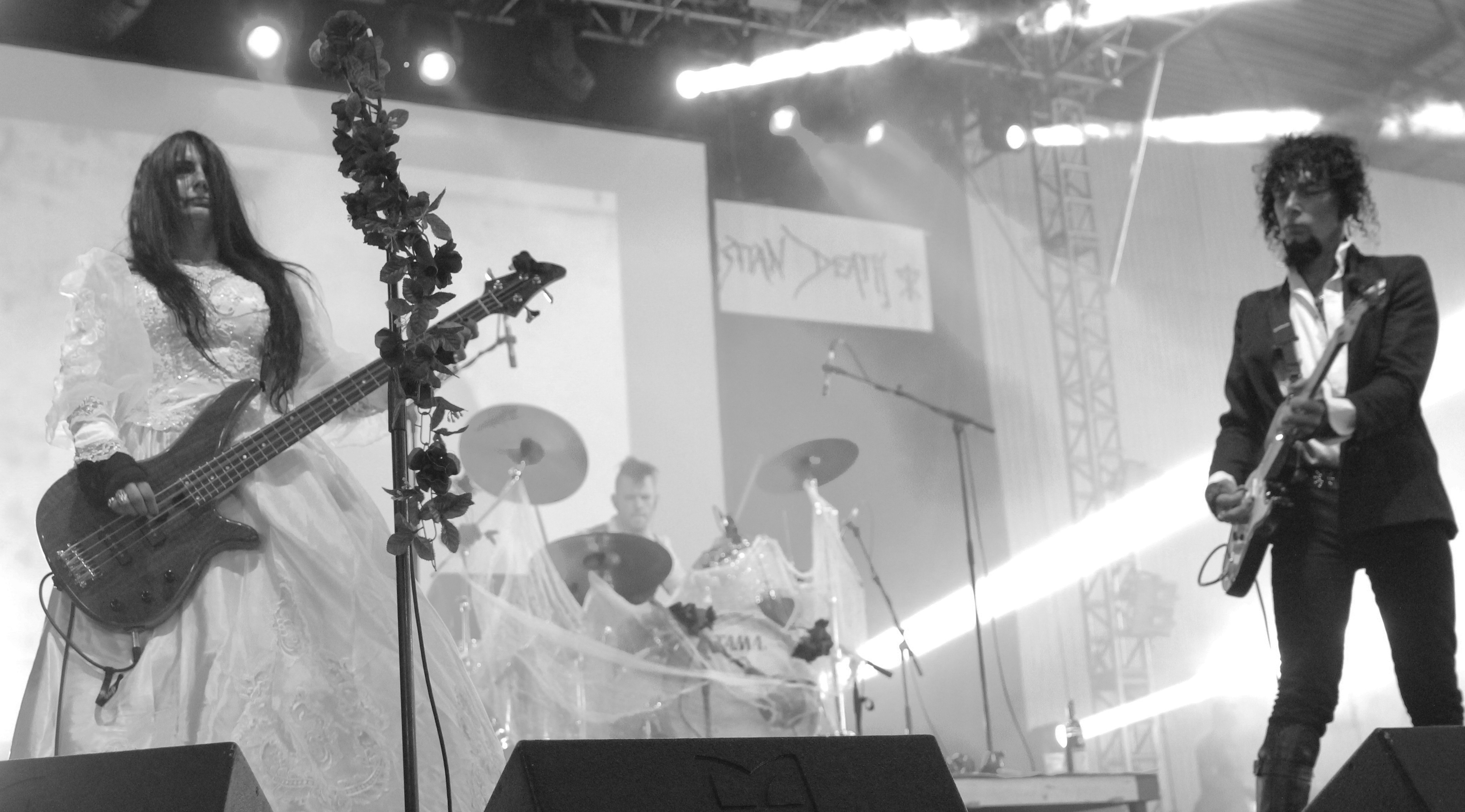
Christian Death performing at Wave-Gotik-Treffen in Leipzig, Germany, 2014

In mid-1985, Williams departed from the group, frustrated by Kand's increasing control of the band and perceived disregard for how touring affected the members' ventures outside of music. He originally planned to do this under the pretext that DeMone would also be leaving, however she soon decided not to, as that would also mean separating Kand from their child together. Following Williams' departure, the remaining members made an effort to change the band's name to Sin and Sacrifice, transitioning to that name through booking their next tour as the Sin and Sacrifice of Christian Death. However, the promoters did not adhere to this change, instead having them booked as simply Christian Death. This issue then became exacerbated once they were offered a record deal by Supporti Fonografici which they could only accept if they continued on as Christian Death. Augmented by bassist Johann Schumann and guitarist and keyboardist Barry Galvin, the band recorded an EP for Supporti Fonografici titled The Wind Kissed Pictures, credited to "For Sin and Sacrifice Must We Die a Christian Death". The EP was later reissued in Germany and the U.S., credited to Christian Death.

Their first post-Williams studio album was 1986's Atrocities, a concept album about the aftereffects of World War II on the European psyche, which was followed by 1987's The Scriptures, recorded by a revamped line-up of Kand, DeMone, Glass, guitarist James Beam and bassist Kota. Longtime drummer Glass left the group following the release of The Scriptures and returned to California, where he eventually worked with several Williams side projects.

The band had their biggest successes on the UK Independent Chart with the 1987–89 singles "Sick of Love", "Church of No Return" and "Zero Sex" and the 1988 studio album Sex and Drugs and Jesus Christ. Following the "Zero Sex" single, DeMone opted to leave the band.

Valor recorded the two-part All the Love All the Hate concept album (1989) in collaboration with Nick the Bastard, which spawned the double A-side single "We Fall Like Love"/"I Hate You".

During the late 1980s, while also recording as Shadow Project, Williams resurrected his own version of Christian Death, with his wife Eva O contributing guitar as well as vocals. Billing themselves as the original Christian Death, they were rejoined by first-album guitarist Agnew for a 1989 tour of Canada. The band was signed to Cleopatra Records, and released The Iron Mask studio album and Skeleton Kiss EP in 1992. Williams' reclamation of the Christian Death name sparked a fierce battle with Kand. However, Kand already had the rights to the name due to Williams' departure from the band and subsequent neglect of the moniker. Williams consequently billed his version of the band as "Christian Death featuring Rozz Williams". After this, Williams' version released The Path of Sorrows studio album in 1993 and The Rage of Angels in 1994. A 1993 show featuring Only Theatre of Pain-era members Williams, Agnew and Belanger (along with bassist Casey Chaos) performing live at Los Angeles' Patriot Hall was recorded and later released in 2001 as a DVD by Cleopatra. Williams pursued other projects before committing suicide on April 1, 1998.

Meanwhile, Kand's Christian Death continued performing and recording, issuing the studio album Insanus, Ultio, Proditio, Misercordiaque (1990), on which Kand used unused vocals from Rozz on the song Infanus Vexatio. Kand conducted the English Abbey Choir and the Commonwealth Chamber Orchestra. The band added bassist Maitri in 1991. Her first concert with Christian Death took place at the Contemporary Festival, held at the Anfitheatro delle Cascine in Florence, Italy on 12 July 1991. The band released the studio album Sexy Death God in 1994, the double-live set Amen in 1995, the Nostradamus-themed Prophecies in 1996, and Pornographic Messiah in 1998.

In 2000, Christian Death added drummer Will Sarginson and toured Europe with Britain's Cradle of Filth in support of the Born Again Anti Christian studio album.

Kand and Maitri also formed another band, black metal and deathrock act Lover of Sin, releasing the studio album Christian Death Presents Lover of Sin in 2002.

For Christian Death's 2003 tour, they were augmented by Cradle of Filth guitarist Gian Pyres.

Christian Death released American Inquisition in 2007, featuring new drummer Nate Hassan.

In 2014, the band embarked on the 30th Anniversary Catastrophe Ballet tour, beginning in Europe and continuing through the year's end in North, South and Central America.

In January 2015, Christian Death announced the planned release of the PledgeMusic funded studio album, The Root of All Evilution. The album was digitally released on August 14, 2015, by Knife Fight Media, and on vinyl on October 16, 2015, by Season of Mist. A CD release was announced for December 18, 2015, on The End Records.

The band's next studio album, titled Evil Becomes Rule, was released in May 2022.

John Albert, who had co-founded Christian Death with Williams and later went on to briefly play drums in Bad Religion, died on May 3, 2023.

== Musical style and content ==
Christian Death's style is considered gothic rock, deathrock and art punk. According to Steve Huey of AllMusic, Christian Death's music "relied on slow, doomy, effects-laden guitar riffs and ambient horror-soundtrack synths". According to Huey, Christian Death's lyrics involve shock value and are often about topics like "blasphemy, morbidity, drug use, and sexual perversity". Necrophilia also is a topic that has been used in Christian Death's lyrics. Liz Ohanesian of LA Weekly wrote that Christian Death experiments "with dirgey guitars, tribal drums and overtly spooky imagery". According to author Liisa Ladouceur, along with "spooky guitars and keyboards", elements of genres such as post-punk and spoken word also have been used in Christian Death's music.

== Legacy ==
Artists that have been inspired by Christian Death include Celtic Frost, Tribulation, In Solitude, Tombs, Type O Negative, the 69 Eyes, Prayers, Marilyn Manson, Ghostemane, Greg Mackintosh of Paradise Lost, Perry Farrell of Jane's Addiction, Aesop Dekker of Agalloch and Ludicra, Trent Reznor of Nine Inch Nails and Jonathan Davis of Korn. The band's bleak, anti-Christian aesthetic and lyrics were also particularly influential on the bands of black metal's second wave.

== Discography ==
Rozz Williams-led line-ups

- Only Theatre of Pain (1982)
- Catastrophe Ballet (1984)
- Ashes (1985)
- The Iron Mask (1992) (Christian Death featuring Rozz Williams)
- The Path of Sorrows (1993) (Christian Death featuring Rozz Williams)
- The Rage of Angels (1994) (Christian Death featuring Rozz Williams)

Valor Kand-led line-ups

- Atrocities (1986)
- The Scriptures (1987)
- Sex and Drugs and Jesus Christ (1988)
- All the Love All the Hate (Part One: All the Love) (1989)
- All the Love All the Hate (Part Two: All the Hate) (1989)
- Insanus, Ultio, Proditio, Misericordiaque (1990)
- Sexy Death God (1994)
- Prophecies (1996)
- Pornographic Messiah (1998)
- Born Again Anti Christian (2000)
- American Inquisition (2007)
- The Root of All Evilution (2015)
- Evil Becomes Rule (2022)
