= The Oresteia in the arts and popular culture =

Reflections of the Oresteia in the arts and popular culture show the influence of the classic trilogy of tragedies by Aeschylus.

== Opera, ballet and incidental music ==
- Several composers have written musical treatments of all or part of Aeschylus's trilogy. From the late 19th century comes Sergey Taneyev's full-length opera Oresteia. In the 20th century Soviet composer Yury Alexandrovich Falik composed a one-act ballet Oresteia; Darius Milhaud supplied incidental music for the plays, the Vienese composer Ernst Krenek wrote Leben des Orest (The Life of Orestes) (1929), and Iannis Xenakis wrote at least three works for voices and instruments based on the trilogy. There is a one-act opera Il furore di Oreste by Flavio Testi (from The Libation Bearers) and "Prologue", by Harrison Birtwistle (from Agamemnon), for tenor and chamber ensemble. Mozart's opera Idomeneo features Electra as a major character. Elektra (opera) is a one-act opera by Richard Strauss, first performed at the Dresden State Opera on January 25, 1909. Choreographer Martha Graham created the evening-length dance drama Clytemnestra, in 1958, giving the Oresteia a feminist spin. In this version, the murdered queen recalls the events of the trilogy from her point of view, and is absolved of dishonor.

== Cinema ==
- The 1947 film Mourning Becomes Electra, based on Eugene O'Neill's play of the same name and directed by Dudley Nichols, utilizes concepts and inspiration from Greek mythology in a modern-day setting. Starring Rosalind Russell as the "Electra", Michael Redgrave as the "Orestes", Katina Paxinou as the "Clytemnestra", Leo Genn as the "Aegisthus", Raymond Massey as the "Agamemnon", Kirk Douglas as the "Pylades", et al. Both Redgrave and Russell received Academy Award nominations, for Best Actor and Best Actress, respectively.
- The Italian poet and filmmaker Pier Paolo Pasolini planned to make a version of the trilogy, set in an unnamed African colony. His goal was to use the Oresteia to comment on the emergence of democracy in Africa; however, during a research expedition captured in the documentary Notes Towards an African Orestes (1975), a group of African students objected to the project on the grounds that an ancient European text would have little to say about modern African history and that Pasolini was treating Africa as a single entity and not as a continent of diverse, complex cultures. Pasolini abandoned the project.
- A version of Oresteia, set in modern Greece, is presented in 1975 film The Travelling Players by Theo Angelopoulos. Chrysothemis is an important figure here apart from Clytemnestra, Aegisthus, Agamemnon and Pylades. She was invented by Sophocles as Electra's sister and does not appear in Aeschylus where Iphigeneia is sacrificed. Angelopoulos represents through this tragedy the history of 20th-century Greece, the political turmoils, widespread political violence, fratricide through civil war and foreign intervention.
- The Spaghetti Western Il pistolero dell'Ave Maria, also known as The Forgotten Pistolero, is based on the myth and set in Mexico following the Second Mexican Empire. Ferdinando Baldi, who directed the film, was also a professor of classical literature who specialized in Greek tragedy.

== Radio ==
In 2014 BBC Radio 3 broadcast the entire Oresteia over the course of three weeks as part of their Drama on 3 series:

- Agamemnon (12 January 2014) adapted by Simon Scardifield, directed by Sasha Yevtushenko
- The Libation Bearers (19 January 2014) adapted by Ed Hines, directed by Marc Beeby
- The Furies (26 January 2014) adapted by Rebecca Lenkiewicz, directed by Sasha Yevtushenko

The casts included Lesley Sharp as Clytemnestra, Will Howard as Orestes, Joanne Froggatt as Electra, Sean Murray as Aegisthus/Judge, Georgie Fuller as Iphigenia, Joel MacCormack as Pylades/Apollo, Hugo Spear as Agamemnon, Anamaria Marinca as Cassandra, Karl Johnson as Calchas and Chipo Chung as Athena.

== Theatre ==
- Irish-American playwright, William Alfred, closely based his 1953 verse play "Agamemnon" on the first play of Aeschylus' trilogy.
- English playwright Steven Berkoff wrote an adaption of Agamemnon in 1977.
- Irish playwright Marina Carr loosely borrows the plot of the first two parts of the Oresteia in her 2002 play, Ariel, which is set in the contemporary Irish midlands.
- French playwright and philosopher Jean-Paul Sartre closely based his play The Flies (French: Les Mouches) on the Oresteia. He tellingly recreates the intense persecution of Orestes by the Furies, but the reactions of Orestes are transformed by Sartre's existentialist philosophy mixed with material highly suggestive of rebellion. This undoubtedly because it was written during the Nazi occupation of France.
- American playwright Eugene O'Neill based Mourning Becomes Electra on the Oresteia. It is likewise composed of three plays, with themes corresponding to Aeschylus' trilogy. It takes place at the end of the American Civil War as opposed to the Trojan War.
- South African theater artist Yael Farber based her piece Molora (Ashes) on the Orestia. She set its themes within the context of the Truth and Reconciliation Commission hearings of South Africa in the demise of apartheid. Molora was originally produced at the Market Theatre in Johannesburg.
- Big Art Group based their participatory serial project The People (2007) on a retelling of the Oresteia using community and ensemble members in a multimedia performance projected on a public building
- American deaf director Ethan Sinnott creates the first deaf translation of the Oresteia's Agamemnon in 2008. This play was designed specifically for deaf actors to perform for deaf audiences, but also provided captioning for hearing audience members, and makes use of the strong visual-based storytelling of the trilogy of the Oresteia.
- Northwestern University theater group Sit & Spin Productions produced a show in May 2008 called Memory Furies, which used video projection to combine elements from the 1959 French New Wave film Hiroshima mon amour with the Oresteia.
- Action To The Word Theatre Company performed Alexandra Spencer-Jones' second world war-time reworking of Agamemnon at Camden People's Theatre, London in October 2010 directed by Alexandra Spencer-Jones
- Action To The Word Theatre Company performed Alexandra Spencer-Jones' 1953 reworking of Agamemnon at St Giles In The Field in May 2011 directed by Alexandra Spencer-Jones
- American playwright David Foley created an update of the Oresteia in his play The murders at Argos
- In 2014 MacMillan Films staged the entire Oresteia using Peter Arnott's translation of Agamemnon, Libation Bearers and Eumenides.
- American director Jonathan Vandenberg conceived and directed Oresteia, an avant-garde work inspired by Aeschylus' trilogy. It first performed at Riverside Theatre in 2011. It was presented as part of the Greek Festival at Classic Stage Company in 2015.

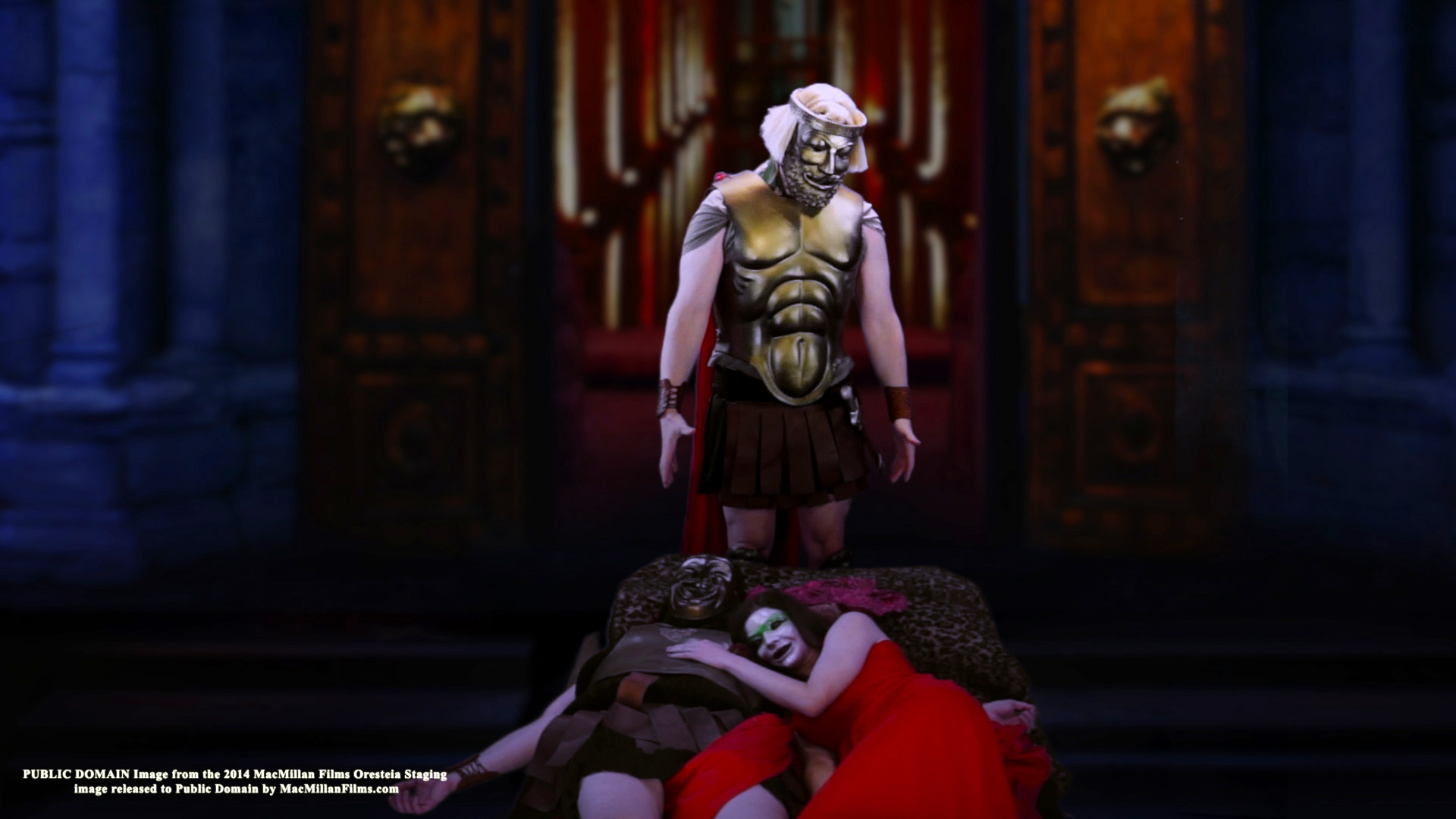
Orestes over his slain mother in the MacMillan Films 2014 Oresteia Staging.

== Fiction ==
- The Furies metaphorically plague the character Lily Bart in Edith Wharton's novel The House of Mirth and the character Gwendolen Harleth in George Eliot's Daniel Deronda
- Franco-American novelist Jonathan Littell draws on The Eumenides in his 2006 novel The Kindly Ones.
- American novelist Joyce Carol Oates took elements of the story and adapted them to the modern day upper-class enclaves of Washington DC in her 1981 novel Angel of Light.
- British author J. K. Rowling cites a passage from The Libation Bearers in the preface of the seventh and final Harry Potter novel, Harry Potter and the Deathly Hallows.
- In writing his novel Watership Down, Richard Adams based both the concept and role of Fiver's character on Cassandra and the role she plays in the first part of the Oresteia. The connection is most evident in the book's first chapter (which is headed by an epigraph from the play), in which Fiver has a vision of his birthplace drenched in blood, echoing Cassandra's doom-laden prophecies which are not seen for what they truly are.
- Galician author Álvaro Cunqueiro rewrote the story with major changes to the plot (including the ending) in his 1969 novel Un hombre que se parecía a Orestes (A man who looked like Orestes).
- American author Philip K. Dick was influenced by the Oresteia in creating the premise behind the short story Minority Report.
- American author Thomas Berger retold the story in his 1990 novel Orrie's Story, setting it in small town America at the close of the Second World War.
- Neil Gaiman's influential graphic novel Sandman, among many other mythical and classical allusions, includes a major storyline called "The Kindly Ones" roughly based on The Eumenides (which name "the kindly ones" is a direct translation of.)
- The episode "All Great Neptune's Ocean" in Andromeda (TV series) made explicit reference to Orestes.
- Book One of Thomas Wolfe's autobiographical novel "Of Time and the River" is entitled "Orestes: Flight Before Fury".
- The novel House of Names by Colm Tóibín is a retelling of The Oresteia.
- The Songs of Penelope trilogy by Claire North includes a retelling of parts of The Oresteia.

== Poetry ==
- Poet Robinson Jeffers's The Tower Beyond Tragedy is a modern, verse version of the Oresteia including references to the World Wars.
- Poet T. S. Eliot's play The Family Reunion is based on The Eumenides.
- Poet Sylvia Plath's poem The Colossus alludes to the blue sky of the Oresteia.

== Popular song ==
- La Tragedie d'Oreste et Electre: Album by British band The Cranes (band) which is a musical adaptation of Jean-Paul Sartre's The Flies.
- Popular singer Monica Richards of Faith and the Muse has based work in the play. Specifically, "The Chorus of the Furies" which appears on the album Evidence of Heaven by Faith and the Muse references this story.
- A Perfect Circle's debut album, Mer de Noms, includes a track titled "Orestes". The lyrics written by Maynard James Keenan are recognisable as referring to the ancient fable; the chorus states "[I've] got to cut away, clear away, snip away and sever this umbilical residue [that's] keeping me from killing you."
- Virgin Steele based two concept albums on the Oresteia.
- Two of German power metal group Blind Guardian's songs from their seventh album A Night at the Opera, Under the Ice and And Then There Was Silence are centered around Cassandra, though Under the Ice is the only one of the two based specifically on the events of The Orestia.

== Visual arts ==
- Three Studies for Figures at the Base of a Crucifixion, a 1944 triptych painted by artist Francis Bacon, is based on the Eumenides—or Furies.
- Francis Bacon painted Triptych Inspired by the Oresteia of Aeschylus (1981).
