= William Faith =

American goth/punk musician

- Born: August 28, 1967 (age 58)
- Genres: Gothic rock, darkwave, anarcho-punk, deathrock
- Instruments: Vocals, guitar
- Years active: 1970s–present
- Labels: Mortarhate Records; Alice In... Cleopatra Records; The Fossil Dungeon; Metropolis Records
- Website: http://www.thebellwethersyndicate.com/william-faith/

William Faith (born August 28, 1967) is an American goth/punk musician. He is best known for his work as part of Faith and the Muse.

He is a former member of the gothic bands Rozz Williams' Christian Death, Shadow Project, Mephisto Walz and briefly as support for Sex Gang Children during a one-off performance in 1993 at The Roxy Theatre. Faith was a founding member of the goth-punk band Wreckage (where he was known as Bill E. Bones), as well as anarcho-punk collective Anima Mundi.

Faith is perhaps best known as a founding member of Faith and the Muse. A longtime member of the Los Angeles gothic rock and punk scene, Faith has also produced records for a range of artists.

His younger sister, Cynthia Coulter, is a member of the bands Mercury's Antennae, This Ascension, and was also a touring member of Faith and the Muse.

In 2011, William Faith relocated to Chicago, Illinois and formed his current project The Bellwether Syndicate with his partner Sarah "Scary Lady Sarah" Rose Faith. William and Sarah also work as a DJ duo called The Pirate Twins, and were married in August 2016.

In addition to his current work with The Bellwether Syndicate, Faith maintains his role as guitarist for English anarcho-punk stalwarts Conflict and bassist for The March Violets, although he announced leaving The March Violets on January 2, 2024.

== Selected discography ==
=== Faith and the Muse ===
- Elyria (Tess Records) (1994)
- Annwyn, Beneath the Waves (Tess Records) (1996)
- Evidence of Heaven (Neue Ästhetik Multimedia) (1999)
- Vera Causa (Metropolis Records) (2001)
- The Burning Season (Metropolis Records) (2003)
- ankoku butoh (Danse Macabre Records) (2009)

=== Christian Death ===
- The Rage of Angels (Cleopatra) (1994)
- The Path of Sorrows (Cleopatra) (1993)
- Death in Detroit (Cleopatra) (1995)

=== Mephisto Walz ===
- Crocosmia (Gymnastic) (1992)
- Terra Regina (Cleopatra) (1993)
- As Apostles Forget EP (Gymnastic) (1992)
- The Eternal Deep (Cleopatra) (1994)
- V/A The Disease of Lady Madeline (Anubis) (1994)

=== Wreckage ===
- Crawling From The Wreckage (1994)
- The Good, The Bad, The Ugly, and The Dead (Mere Mortal) (1996)
- V/A Goth Box (Cleopatra) (1996)
- V/A Tantrum (Cocktail) (1990)
- V/A Children of the Damned (Apollyon) (1996)
- Subways's End (Noise Pollution) (1990)

=== Anima Mundi ===
- Anima Mundi (Mortarhate Records, 2007)

=== The Bellwether Syndicate ===
- The Night Watch EP (The Bellwether Underground, 2013)
- Vestige & Vigil (2023)

== See also ==
- Faith and the Muse
- Christian Death
- Shadow Project
- Monica Richards
