= Arianrhod (disambiguation) =

Arianrhod is a figure in Welsh mythology. Other notable uses of the name Arianrhod include:

- "All lovers Lost/Arianrhod", a music track on the album Vera Causa by Faith and the Muse
- Arianrhod Hyde, fictional character in the novel The Merlin Conspiracy by Diana Wynne Jones
- Arianrhod RPG, Japanese fantasy role-playing game
- Robyn Arianrhod, Australian historian of science
