= Ancile =

Sacred shields in ancient Rome

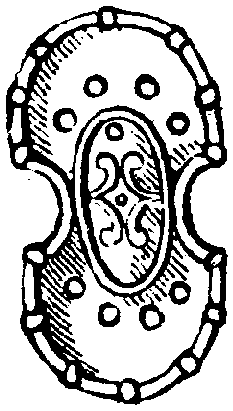
Ancient shield illustration from Nordisk familjebok

The ancile (Latin, plural ancilia) was a sacred shield of ancient Rome. According to legend, the divine shield fell from heaven during the reign of Numa Pompilius, the second king of Rome. He ordered eleven copies made to confuse would-be thieves, since the original shield was regarded as one of the pignora imperii (pledges of rule), sacred guarantors that perpetuated Rome as a sovereign entity. The shields were kept in the Temple of Mars.

The shields are identified by their distinct 'figure of eight' shape which is said to be derived from Mycenaean art. As described by Plutarch, the shape of the ancile is a standard shield, neither round or oval, which has curved indentations on both sides.

The ancilia were kept by the Salii, a body of twelve priests instituted for that purpose by Numa. The Salii wielded them ritually in the procession of the Quinquatrus in March. According to Varro, the ancilia may have also made an appearance in the Armilustrium ('Purification of Arms') in October. The Salii were said to beat their shields with staves while performing ritual dances and singing the Carmen Saliare.

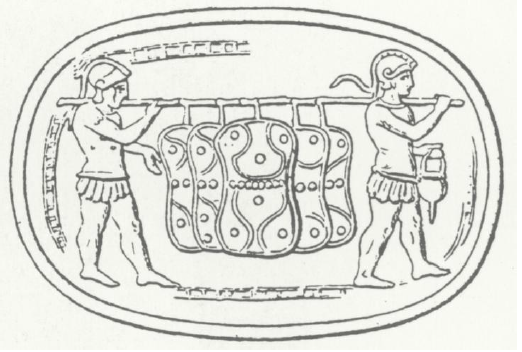
This image depicts five ancilia being carried

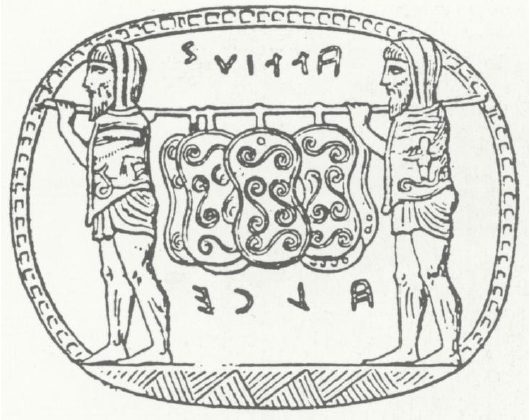
This image depicts the ancilia being carried. The "figure-8" shape is seen clearly and each have a detailed design on them.

== Etymology ==
Ancient sources give varying etymologies for the word ancile. Some derive it from the Greek ankylos (ἀγκύλος), "crooked". Plutarch thinks the word may be derived from the Greek ankōn (ἀγκών), "elbow", the weapon being carried on the elbow. Varro derives it ab ancisu, as being cut or arched on the two sides, like the bucklers of the Thracians called peltae.

== Myth ==
When the original ancile fell, a voice was heard which declared that Rome should be mistress of the world while the shield was preserved. The shield was said to have been sent down from heaven by Jupiter to Numa. Numa, by the advice, as it is said, of the nymph Egeria, ordered eleven others, perfectly like the first, to be made. This was so that if anyone should attempt to steal it, as Ulysses did the palladium of Troy, they might not be able to distinguish the true ancile from the false ones. According to Ovid’s Fasti, Mamurius Veturius agreed to forge the eleven replicas of the original ancile, if he was given glory by Numa and mentioned in the Carmen Salire. Thus, this myth provides the etiological story for the Cult of Mamurius which was popular in the Augustan Age. The gifting of the ancile to Numa is viewed as a legend which reveals a successful and favorable interaction Numa had with Jupiter.

== Ancile as pignora imperii ==
Maurus Servius Honoratus, an early 4th century grammarian, lists the ancile as one of the seven pignora imperii of the Roman empire in his In Vergilii Aeneidem commentarii (‘Commentary on Virgil’s Aeneid’). Alongside it, Servius includes six other pignora: the stone of the Mother of the Gods, the terracotta chariot of the Veientines, the ashes of Orestes, the sceptre of Priam, the veil of Iliona, and the palladium. Livy mentions the ancilia in a passing reference again in book 5 of Ab Urbe Condita, but does not directly assign them the label of pignus imperii. He only assigns this label to the Palladium and the eternal flame of Vesta.
