= The Burning Season (album) =

Studio album by Faith and the Muse
- Released: July 8, 2003
- Recorded: January – April 2003 at Wisperthal
- Genre: Gothic rock
- Length: 52:15
- Label: Metropolis Records
- Producer: Faith and the Muse

Faith and the Muse chronology
Vera Causa (2001)	The Burning Season (2003)	ankoku butoh (2009)

Professional ratings
Review scores
Source	Rating
Allmusic	4.5/5 stars
Stylus	(C)

The Burning Season is the fourth studio album by Faith and the Muse.

== Track listing ==
No.	Title	Length
1.	"Bait and Switch"	1:15
2.	"Sredni Vashtar"	3:54
3.	"Boudiccea"	5:47
4.	"The Burning Season"	5:39
5.	"Whispered in Your Ear"	4:05
6.	"Gone to Ground"	4:28
7.	"Relic Song"	2:48
8.	"In the Amber Room"	6:33
9.	"Failure to Thrive"	4:58
10.	"Visions"	4:31
11.	"Prodigal"	3:26
12.	"Willow's Song"	4:51
Total length:		52:15

== Credits ==
- All instruments and voices performed by William Faith and Monica Richards except:
  Drums on Tracks 1, 2, 3 & 11 by Chad Blinman
  Violins on 10 & 12 performed and recorded by Matt Howden/Sieben at Redroom, Sheffield, England
  "Gone To Ground" performed with the Happy One-Time Orchestra at Cafe Society
- Produced by Faith and the Muse
- Additional programming and treatments by Chad Blinman
- All songs composed by Faith and the Muse © Elyrian Music 2003, BMI except:
  "Willow's Song" written by Paul Giovanni
- Recorded by William Faith at Wisperthal, Los Angeles, California January - April 2003
- Mixed by Chad Blinman at the Eye Socket, Venice, California
- Mastered by Joe Gastwirt at Joe Gastwirt Mastering, Oak Park, California
- Photos by Clovis IV
- Design and Layout by Monica Richards
- William Faith used Schecter Guitars exclusively for this album.
- Original lyrics by Monica Richards, except "Failure to Thrive", written by William Faith.
