= Vera Causa =

Compilation album by Faith and the Muse
- Released: 2001
- Genre: Gothic rock
- Label: Metropolis Records
- Producer: Faith and the Muse

Faith and the Muse chronology
Evidence of Heaven (1999)	Vera Causa (2001)	The Burning Season (2003)

Professional ratings
Review scores
Source	Rating
Allmusic	4/5 stars

Vera Causa is a two-disc collection of demos, live and rare tracks by Faith and the Muse.

== Track listing ==
=== The Night ===
Live In Heaven:

1. "Cantus"
2. "Scars Flown Proud"
3. "Sparks"
4. "The Silver Circle"
5. "All lovers Lost/Arianrhod"
6. "The Unquiet Grave"
7. "Annwyn, Beneath the Waves"
  Remixes:
8. "Elyria" (Toby Dammit mix) by Full Fathom Five/The Trace (band)
9. "Mercyground" (Rhea's Obsession mix) by Jim Field
10. "The Silver Circle" (Gears and Teeth mix) by Statik/Collide
11. "Shattered In Aspect" (bassX_rmX) by Thomas Rainer/L'ame Immortelle
12. "The Sea Angler" (Vast Ocean mix) by Kevin Kipnis/Purr Machine
13. "Scars Flown Proud" (Hong Kong Hotel mix) by Rodney Orpheus/The Cassandra Complex
14. "Porphyrogene" (Laboratory X Version) by Chad Blinman/Laboratory X

=== The Morning ===
Compilation Appearances, Covers, Acoustic Versions & Rarities:

1. "Frater Ave Atque Vale"
2. "In Dreams of Mine"
3. "Running Up That Hill" — Kate Bush
4. "Patience Worth" (piano version)
5. "Hollow Hills" — Bauhaus
6. "Soul In Isolation" — The Chameleons (live)
7. "The Breath of a Kiss" (demo)
8. "Muted Land"
9. "Annwyn, Beneath the Waves" (acoustic)
10. "A Winter Wassail"
11. "Romeo's Distress" — Christian Death (live)
12. "Drown" — Strange Boutique (acoustic)
13. "All Lovers Lost" (demo)
14. "Heal" (original demo)

== Credits ==
- Booklet Text Compiled by Ginger Collins
- Back Traycard photo by Sabine Eichmann
- Back Booklet Cover photo by E. Katie Holm
- Cover painting & Graphic design by Monica Richards
- Mastered by Ramon Breton at Ocean View Digital Mastering, West Los Angeles, California

All titles written by Faith and the Muse except Cover songs/Frater lyrics - p Metropolis Records 2001

=== Night ===
- Live tracks recorded April 2000 in Leipzig, Germany and Gent, Belgium
- Live Musicians:
  Kenton Holmes: guitars, keyboards & percussion
  Monica Richards: vocals & recorder
  Cynthia Coulter: bass guitar, hammered dulcimer, violin & percussion
  Jeremy George: percussion & keyboards
  Stevyn Grey: drums & percussion
  William Faith: guitars, cello, mandolin, percussion & vocals
- Live Recording by Chad Blinman
- Mixed by William Faith at Wisperthal, Los Angeles,
- Thanks to Raif Jurgens for live sound on the European shows, Patty Hele and Mother Dance, Sabine Eichmann, Brian Necro, Wayne Hays, Clovis IV and Grant George

=== Morning ===
Covers:

"Running Up That Hill"

Guest Drummers: Stevyn Grey and Jeremy George
Recorded February, 2001 at Audio International- Ojai, California
Produced by Faith and the Muse
Recorded by Chad Blinman Mixed by William Faith
© Kate Bush - Kate Bush Music Ltd.

"Hollow Hills"

Recorded August, 1993
at New American Sound - Santa Barbara, CA
Produced by F&TM • Recorded and Mixed by Mark Casselman
© Bauhaus - Beggars Banquet Music Ltd.

"Soul In Isolation" (live)

© The Chameleons - Man-Ken Music Ltd. (BMI)

"Romeo's Distress" (live)

© Christian Death - American Lesion Music/Artshow Noises (BMI)

"Drown"

Guest Guitarist: Frederick E. Smith Jr
Recorded July, 2001 at Wisperthal - Los Angeles, CA
Produced by Faith and the Muse
Recorded and Mixed by William Faith
© Strange Boutique - Copyright Control
