= Elyria (album) =

Studio album by Faith and the Muse
- Released: 1994, 2001 re-release
- Recorded: March–April 1994 at New American Sound
- Genre: Gothic rock, darkwave
- Length: 56:55
- Label: TESS Records (1994); Metropolis Records (2001)
- Producer: Faith and the Muse

Faith and the Muse chronology
Elyria (1994)	Annwyn, Beneath the Waves (1996)

Professional ratings
Review scores
Source	Rating
AllMusic	2.5/5 stars

Elyria is the debut studio album by rock band Faith and the Muse.

== Critical reception ==
The Washington Post gave the album a mixed review, writing: "A meeting of gothic minds, Faith and The Muse's debut, Elyria, fails to avoid some of the genre's more hackneyed cliches: Gonging church bells and whipping winds conjure a requisitely dank atmosphere, and [Monica] Richards's lyrics reinforce the overwrought ambience." The review ultimately judged the album to be "richly textured" and "an engaging, if melodramatic, effort."

== Track listing ==
No.	Title	Length
1.	"Elyria"	4:27
2.	"Sparks"	6:49
3.	"All Lovers Lost"	4:48
4.	"Interlude: Annabell"	1:58
5.	"Vervain"	7:07
6.	"The Unquiet Grave"	2:46
7.	"Iago's Demise"	3:46
8.	"Interlude: Maleficio"	1:25
9.	"When to Her Lute Corinna Sings"	2:17
10.	"Caesura"	2:47
11.	"The Trauma Coil"	7:29
12.	"Mercyground"	6:39
13.	"Heal"	2:11
14.	"Epilogue: Twilight"	2:26
Total length:		56:55

== Credits ==
- All instruments and voices performed by William Faith and Monica Richards
- Mastered by Tom Baker at Future Disc Systems, Hollywood, California
- All titles composed by Faith and the Muse c and p Elyrian Music, BMI, 1994, except:
  "When to Her Lute Corinna Sings," text by Thomas Campion - Anno Domini 1600
- Artwork and layout by Monica Richards
- Photography by Clovis IV (photographer)|Clovis IV of Vertigo Graphic Arts, Santa Barbara, California
- Original lyrics by Monica Richards, except "The Trauma Coil", written by William Faith.
  "The Unquiet Grave", traditional ballad circa 1400
