= Beneath the Waves =

Beneath the Waves may refer to:

== Film and TV ==
- Beneath the Waves by director Renee Marie Freya Tingley

== Music ==
- Annwyn, Beneath the Waves, album

=== Songs ===
- Beneath the Waves (Ayreon song)
- "Beneath the Waves", song by Battlelore from Evernight
- "Beneath the Waves", song by Future of the Left The Plot Against Common Sense
- "Beneath the Waves", song by Warbringer from War Without End
- "Beneath the Waves", song by Young Guns from All Our Kings Are Dead
