= F&TM =

F&TM may refer to:

- Faith and the Muse, a gothic rock band
- Florence and the Machine, featuring singer-songwriter Florence Welch
