= Agathoergi =

The Agathoergi (Ancient Greek: ἀγαθοεργοί) were a special designation for a group of Spartan knights (ἱππεῖς), who were part of a larger body of 300 knights serving as bodyguards to the kings of Sparta during times of war. Every year, five men from the 300 were selected to serve as Agathoergi for specific diplomatic missions to foreign states. A famous one was Lichas, who according to the legends played a key role in fulfilling an oracle that required the Spartans to obtain the bones of Orestes in order to conquer Tegea.

== Role and Function ==
The primary function of the Agathoergi was to undertake important diplomatic missions to foreign states. Their service was considered an honorable and prestigious task, and they were entrusted with the responsibility of representing Sparta's interests abroad. Their duties lasted for one year, after which they retired from their mission.

== Selection Process ==
While it has traditionally been believed that the Agathoergi were selected based on seniority from among the 300, some scholars have argued that they were chosen by the ephors, the elected magistrates of Sparta, without regard to age.
