= Mamuralia =

Roman religious festival

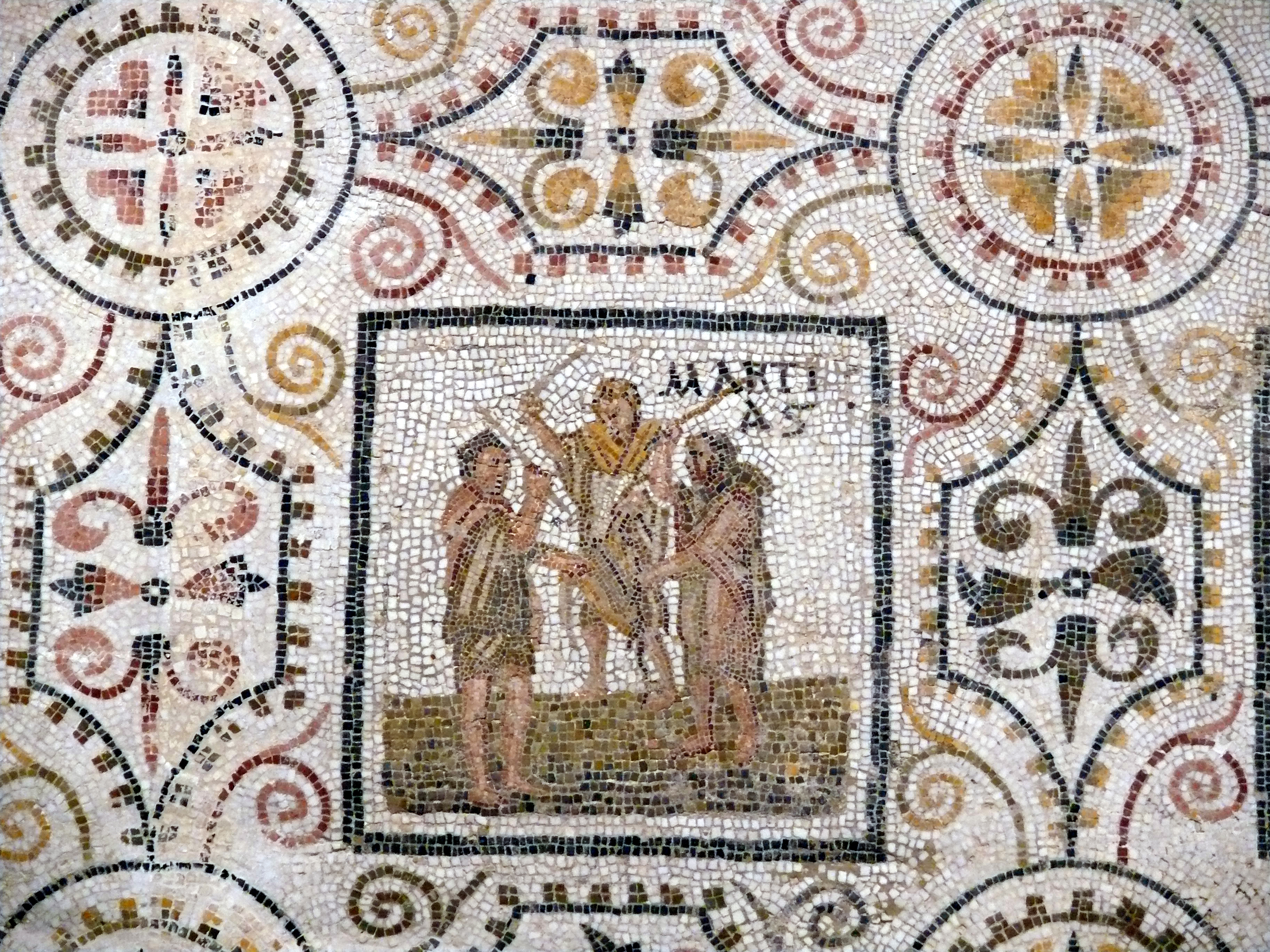
March panel from a mosaic of the months, possibly the Rite of Mamurius (from El Djem, Tunisia, first half of 3rd century AD); despite the late date, March is positioned as the first month of the year

In ancient Roman religion, the Mamuralia or Sacrum Mamurio ('Rite for Mamurius') was a festival held on March 14 or 15, named only in sources from late antiquity. According to Joannes Lydus, an old man wearing animal skins was beaten ritually with sticks. The name is connected to Mamurius Veturius, who according to tradition was the craftsman who made the ritual shields (ancilia) that hung in the temple of Mars. Because the Roman calendar originally began in March, the Sacrum Mamurio is usually regarded as a ritual marking the transition from the old year to the new. It shares some characteristics with scapegoat or pharmakos ritual.

== The craft of Mamurius ==
According to legend, Mamurius was commissioned by Numa, second king of Rome, to make eleven shields identical to the sacred ancile that fell from the heavens as a pledge of Rome's destiny to rule the world. The ancile was one of the sacred guarantors of the Roman state (pignora imperii), and the replicas were intended to conceal the identity of the original and so prevent its theft; it was thus a kind of "public secret."

The shields were under the care of Mars' priests the Salii, who used them in their rituals. As payment, Mamurius requested that his name be preserved and remembered in the song sung by the Salii, the Carmen Saliare, as they executed movements with the shields and performed their armed dance. Fragments of this archaic hymn survive, including the invocation of Mamurius. Several sources mention the invocation of the hymn and the story of the smith, but only Lydus describes the ritual as the beating of an old man.

Mamurius was also supposed to have made a bronze replacement for a maple statue of Vertumnus, brought to Rome in the time of Romulus. He may have been Oscan and thought to have been buried in his homeland, since at the end of a poem about Vertumnus, Propertius has the god express a wish that the Oscan earth should not wear away Mamurius's skilled hands. Veturius is considered either an Etruscan or Oscan family name.

"Mamurius Veturius" became the nickname of Marcus Aurelius Marius Augustus, a former smith or metalworker who was briefly Roman emperor in 269.

== Calendar and name ==
The divine shield is supposed to have fallen from the sky on March 1, the first day of the month Martius, named after the god Mars. In the earliest Roman calendar, which the Romans believed to have been instituted by Romulus, the ten-month year began with Mars' month, and the god himself was thus associated with the agricultural year and the cycle of life and death. The number of ancilia corresponds to the twelve months in the reformed calendar attributed to Numa, and scholars often interpret the Mamuralia as originally a New Year festival, with various explanations as to how it was moved from the beginning of the month to the midpoint.

The Mamuralia is named as such only in calendars and sources dating from the 4th century of the Christian era and later. On the Calendar of Filocalus (354 AD), it is placed on March 14, but by Lydus on the Ides. The earliest extant calendars place an Equirria, one of the sacral chariot races in honor of Mars, on March 14. The festival of Anna Perenna, a goddess of the year (annus), took place on the Ides. Macrobius understood her doubled name to mean "through the year" (perennis, English "perennial"). Jane Ellen Harrison regarded Anna Perenna as the female equivalent of Mamurius, representing the lunar year to his solar year. The Ides were supposed to be determined by the full moon, reflecting the lunar origin of the Roman calendar. On the earliest calendar, the Ides of March would have been the first full moon of the new year.

H. S. Versnel has argued that adjustments made to the calendar over time caused the Mamuralia to be moved from an original place as the last day of the year (the day before the Kalends of March) to the day before the Ides, causing the Equirria on February 27 to be repeated on March 14. Mamurius in this view was associated with Februarius, the month of purifications and care of the dead that originally ended the year, and represented concepts of lustration, rites of passage, and liminality.

Because the name Veturius can be explained as related to Latin vetus, veteris, "old," the ritual figure of Mamurius has often been interpreted as a personification of the Old Year, and the rite as its expulsion. Mamurius may be a form of Mamers, the name of Mars in Oscan (Latin Mavors). The Roman personal name Mamercus was derived from Mamers, which was itself formed from doubling the vocative stem of the god's name; Mamurius would thus be related to the vocative Marmar in the Carmen Arvale, the cult song of the Arval Brothers. Mamurius Veturius would be "old Mars" as the embodiment of the year.

The late Republican scholar Varro, however, takes the name Mamuri Veturi as it appears in the Salian song and analyzes it within a semantic field pertaining to "memory", deriving the reduplicative verb meminisse ("to remember") from memoria ("memory"), "because that which has remained in the mind is again moved." He also places the causative verb monêre, "to warn, advise, remind," in this same group, explaining that the verbal action is meant to create a memory or monimenta, "monument(s)." Therefore, Varro says, when the Salii chant Mamuri Veturi, they are symbolically referring (significant) to archaic memory. Plutarch, in an extended passage on the shields in his Life of Numa, also notes that Mamurius was invoked by the Salii, but that "some say" the phrase means not the name, but veterem memoriam, an "ancient remembrance."

William Warde Fowler, in his 1899 work on Roman festivals, agreed with Mommsen that the story of Mamurius might be "one of those comparatively rare examples of later ritual growing itself out of myth." The name of Mamurius as chanted by the Salii in March may have become attached to the March 14 Equirria, which is omitted from sources that list the Mamuralia.

== Ritual ==
The fullest description of the ritual known as the Mamuralia is given by Joannes Lydus in his 6th-century work De mensibus ("Regarding the Months"). Lydus records that an old man, addressed as Mamurius, was clothed in animal skins and beaten with white sticks, meaning branches that have been peeled, stripped of bark; in a structuralist interpretation, the peeled sticks thus reverse the covering of smooth human flesh with rough animal hides. Lydus does not state that the old man was driven out of the city, but scholars generally infer that he was. As portrayed in the myth of the ancilia, the craftsman Mamurius would seem to be a beneficent figure, and his punishment unearned.

The lateness of this account has raised questions about the festival's authenticity or antiquity, since references in Republican and Imperial calendars or literary sources are absent or oblique. Lydus may have misunderstood descriptions of the Salian rites. Servius says that a day was consecrated to Mamurius on which the Salii "struck a hide in imitation of his art," that is, the blows struck by a smith. A passage from Minucius Felix indicates that the Salii struck skins as the shields were carried in procession. Two mosaics of the Imperial era have been interpreted as illustrating the rite of Mamurius. The calendar mosaic from El Djem, Tunisia (Roman Africa), which places March as the first month, shows three men using sticks to beat an animal hide.

Lydus's understanding of Mamurius may be connected to medieval lore of the wodewose or wild man of the wood, who could play a similar role in winter or new year ceremonies pertaining to Twelfth Night and carnival.

== Statua Mamuri ==
A bronze statue of Mamurius stood near the Temple of Quirinus along the Alta Semita, in Regio VI Alta Semita. It is likely to have been connected with the Curia Saliorum Collinorum, the curia of the Colline Salii, who may have dedicated it.

== Clivus Mamurius ==
"Mamurius Street" appears in medieval records, and took its name from the statue. According to Pomponio Leto, the Italian humanist, the statue and "Mamurius's neighborhood" (Vicus Mamuri) were at the Church of S. Susanna on the Quirinal Hill, though the regionary catalogues locate it nearer the Capitolium Vetus.
