= Annwyn, Beneath the Waves =

Studio album by Faith and the Muse
- Released: June 11, 1996; 2001 re-release
- Recorded: October 1995–March 1996 at The Eye Socket
- Genre: Gothic rock, folk rock
- Length: 58:08
- Label: TESS Records (1996), Metropolis Records (2001)
- Producer: Faith and the Muse, Chad Blinman

Faith and the Muse chronology
Elyria (1994)	Annwyn, Beneath the Waves (1996)	Evidence of Heaven (1999)

Professional ratings
Review scores
Source	Rating
Allmusic	3/5 stars

Annwyn, Beneath the Waves is the second album by Faith and the Muse.

== Track listing ==
No.	Title	Length
1.	"Annwyn, Beneath the Waves"	6:29
2.	"The Silver Circle"	3:07
3.	"Cantus"	4:50
4.	"The Dream of Macsen"	4:53
5.	"Fade and Remain"	4:50
6.	"Arianrhod"	2:08
7.	"Branwen Slayne"	4:52
8.	"Hob Y Derri Dando"	1:23
9.	"Cernunnos"	3:37
10.	"The Hand of Man"	5:50
11.	"The Sea Angler"	4:00
12.	"The Birds of Rhiannon"	3:15
13.	"Rise and Forget"	5:07
14.	"Apparition"	3:47
Total length:		58:08

== Credits ==
- All instruments and voices performed by William Faith and Monica Richards
- Treatments and Programming by Chad Blinman
- Produced by Faith and the Muse and Chad Blinman
- All titles composed by Faith and the Muse c and p Elyrian Music, BMI, 1996 except:
  "Hob Y Derri Dando," Traditional Welsh song
  "The Sea Angler," text by Johann Wolfgang von Goethe
  "Rise and Forget," by Monica Richards, William Faith and Stevyn Grey
- Recorded and mixed October 1995-March 1996 by Chad Blinman at The Eye Socket, Venice, California
- Mastered by Joe Gastwirt and Ramón Bretón at Ocean View Digital, Los Angeles, California
- Cover painting "Annwyn, Beneath the Waves" by Monica Richards, acrylic and glass on canvas, 1995 (with a nod to the great Gustav Klimt)
- Layout, Artwork and Design by Monica Richards
- All Photography and additional Graphics by Clovis IV of Vertigo Graphic Arts, Santa Barbara, California
- Original lyrics by Monica Richards, except "The Hand of Man" and "Cernunnos", written by William Faith, "Rise & Forget" cowritten by Monica & William.
