= Lichas (Spartan) =

Ancient Spartans with the name Lichas may refer to:

- Lichas (Ancient Greek: Λίχας) or Liches (Ancient Greek: Λίχης) was a Spartan Agathoergi who played a key role in fulfilling an oracle that required the Spartans to obtain the bones of Orestes in order to conquer Tegea. Lichas discovered a giant coffin under a blacksmith's shop in Tegea, which matched the oracle’s description. He reported this back to Sparta, and, after being pretended to be banished, he returned, convinced the blacksmith to let him use the house, and dug up the bones. He then brought them back to Sparta, and from that point on, the Spartans were victorious over the Tegeans. The event is believed to have occurred early in the reign of Spartan kings Anaxandrides and Ariston, around 560 BCE.
- Lichas, a Spartan son of Arcesilaus, was a prominent figure in several key events of the Peloponnesian War. In 422 BCE, he unsuccessfully proposed a renewal of the truce between Sparta and Argos. In 420 BCE, after the Spartans were excluded from the Olympic Games, Lichas sent a chariot representing the Boeotian commonwealth. When his horses won, he crowned the charioteer, claiming the victory for himself, which led to public punishment by the Eleians. In 418 BCE, he helped negotiate peace between Sparta and Argos after the Battle of Mantineia. In 412 BCE, Lichas opposed treaties with Persia, particularly a clause recognizing the king’s claim over ancestral territories. However, he also advised caution towards Persia and opposed the violent actions of the Milesians against their Persian garrison. After his death in Miletus, the Milesians refused to allow his burial in the desired place due to his earlier protests. Lichas was well-known across Greece for his hospitality, particularly during the Gymnopaedia, and was famous for this trait.
