= Temple of Cybele (Palatine) =

Temple of Cybele

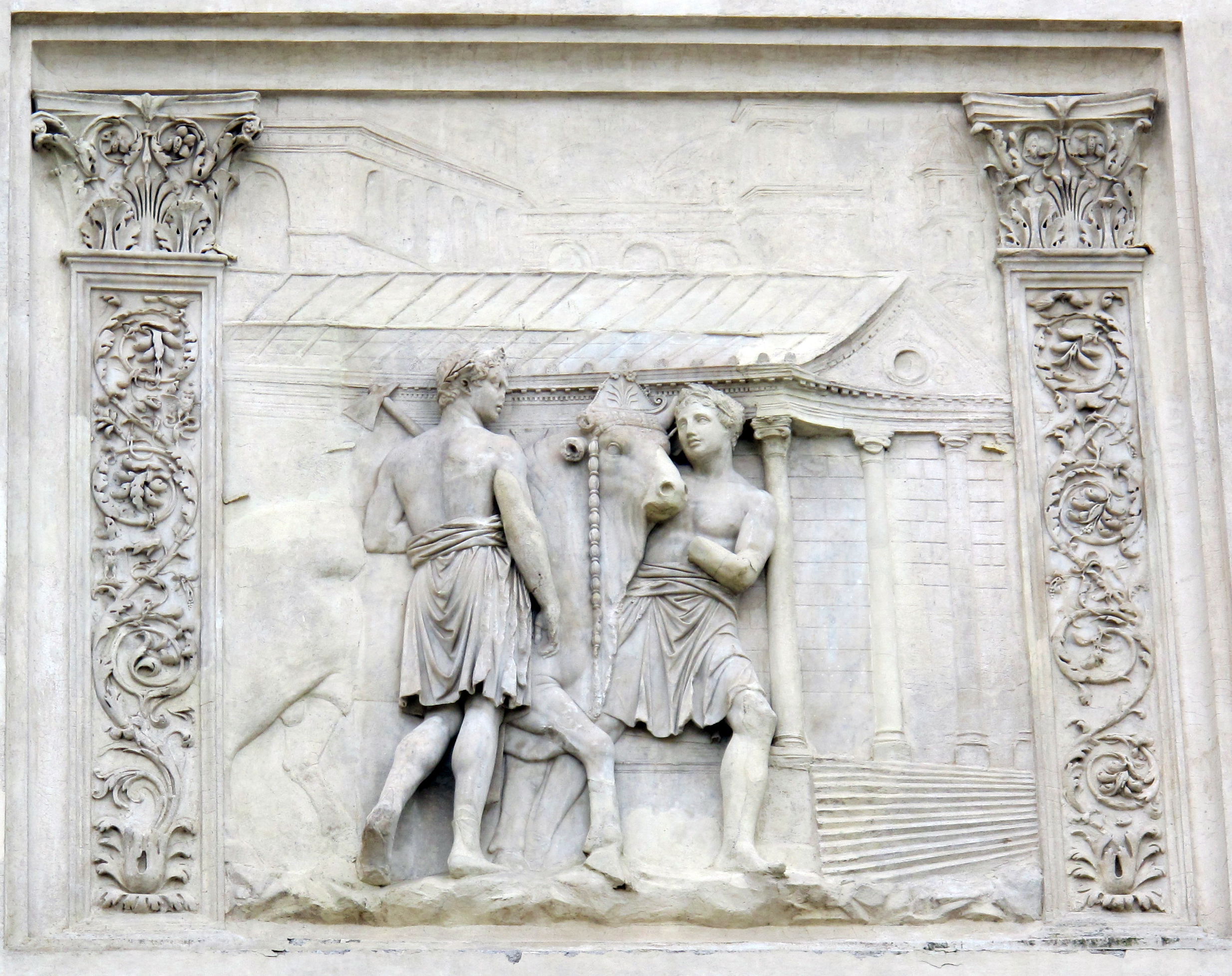
- Temple of Magna Mater on a relief now in Villa Medici, Rome

- Shown in ancient Rome
- Interactive map of Temple of Cybele
- 41°53′22″N 12°29′06″E

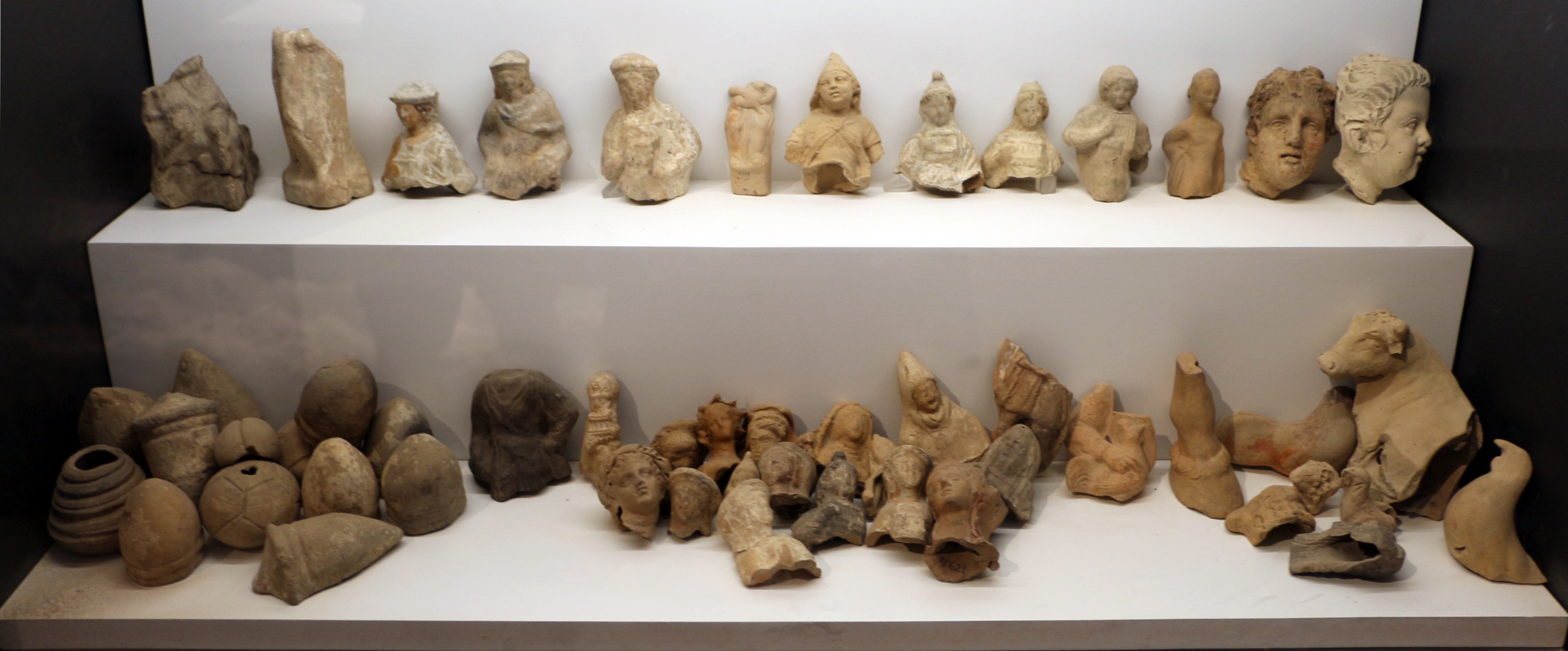
Ex voto, 210-100 BC

The Temple of Cybele or Temple of Magna Mater was Rome's first and most important temple to the Magna Mater ("Great Mother"), who was known to the Greeks as Cybele. It was built to house a particular image or form of the goddess, a meteoric stone brought from Greek Asia Minor to Rome in 204 BC at the behest of an oracle and temporarily housed in the goddess of Victory's Palatine temple. The new temple was dedicated on 11 April 191 BC, and Magna Mater's first Megalesia festival was held on the temple's proscenium.

The temple was sited on the high western slope of the Palatine, overlooking the valley of the Circus Maximus and facing the temple of Ceres on the slopes of the Aventine. It was accessible via a long upward flight of steps from the flattened area or proscenium below, where the goddess's festival games and plays were staged. The goddess's altar was visible both from the proscenium and the temple's interior. The original temple burned down in 111 BC, and was restored by one Metellus, possibly Gaius Caecilius Metellus Caprarius. It burned on a further two occasions in the early Imperial era, and was restored each time by Augustus; his second rebuilding was probably the more sumptuous of the two.

== Description ==
The temple was 33.18 metres deep, and its frontage 17.10 metres wide, accessed by steps of the same width. It was built in the prostyle hexastyle of the Corinthian order. The whole was supported by a massively walled, stucco-faced podium of irregular, thickly mortared tufa and peperino. A coin of Faustina the Elder is thought to show the same temple, with curved roof and a flight of steps.

At the top of the steps is a statue of Cybele enthroned, with a turreted crown and lion attendants. This is consistent with a colossal, fragmentary statue of the goddess, found within the temple precincts. The goddess' meteoric stone may have been kept on a pedestal within the temple cella; or incorporated into the face of a statue and set on a pediment. This stone was known as the acus Matris Deum or the needle of Cybele, described by Servius as being "conical in shape, of a deep brown color" with the appearance of molten rock and sharp to a point. This acus is identified by Servius as a pignora imperii, one of the seven sacred objects which maintained imperial rule.

The temple pediment is shown on the Ara Pietatis relief, which represents Magna Mater in aniconic mode; her empty throne and crown are flanked by two figures of Attis reclining on tympanons; and by two lions who eat from bowls, as if tamed by the goddess' unseen presence.

The temple remained in use until the late 4th century. It was destroyed in 394 AD, on the orders of Emperor Theodosius I during the Persecution of pagans in the late Roman Empire.

== See also ==
- List of Ancient Roman temples

== Sources ==
- Magna Mater, aedes at LacusCurtius
- Roller, Lynn Emrich (1999). In Search of God the Mother: The Cult of Anatolian Cybele. Berkeley and Los Angeles, California: University of California Press. ISBN 0-520-21024-7.
