= Orestes =

Figure in Greek mythology

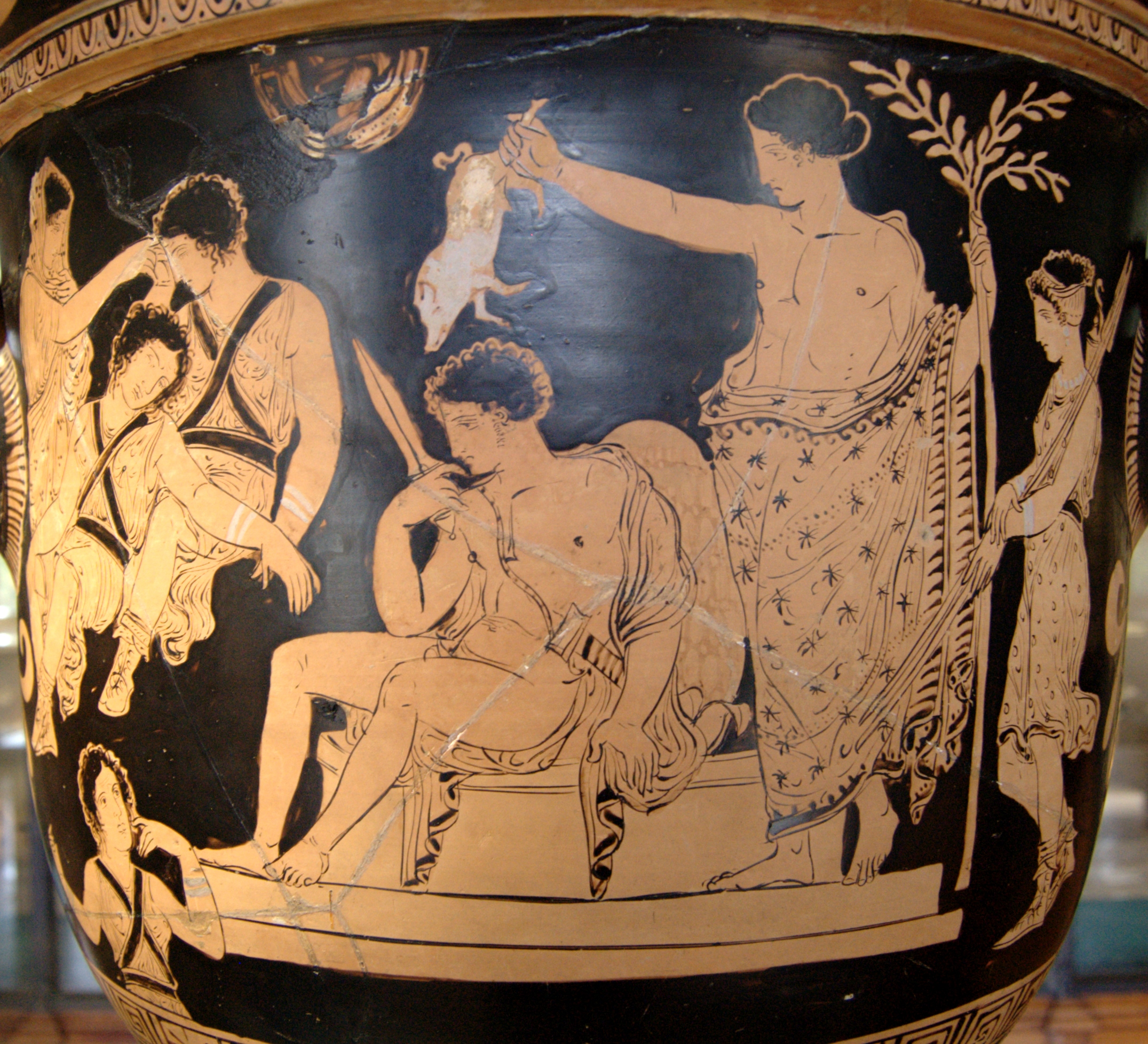
- Orestes being purified by Apollo, red-figure bell-krater, 380–370 BC

Genealogy
- Parents: Agamemnon (father); Clytemnestra (mother)
- Siblings: Iphigenia, Electra
- Spouse: Hermione
- Children: Tisamenus, Penthilus

In Greek mythology, Orestes or Orestis (/ɒˈrɛstiːz/; Ancient Greek: Ὀρέστης [oréstɛːs]) was the son of Agamemnon and Clytemnestra, and the brother of Electra and Iphigenia. He was also known by the patronymic Agamemnonides (Ἀγαμεμνονίδης), meaning "son of Agamemnon." He is the subject of multiple Ancient Greek plays (including Aeschylus' Oresteia), which depict his revenge, madness, and ritual purification.

Orestes was forced into exile after his mother and her lover Aegisthus murdered his father. In an act of revenge, he killed them both. For the crime of matricide he was haunted by the Furies, who drove him to madness. Athena cleansed him of his crime in a divine trial, curing him of his madness. Following his absolution, Orestes ascended to the throne as the king of Mycenae and Sparta, ruling over most of the Peloponnese until his death from a snakebite.

== Etymology ==
The Greek name Ὀρέστης, having become "Orestēs" in Latin and its descendants, is derived from Greek ὄρος (óros, "mountain") and ἵστημι (hístēmi, "to stand"), and so can be thought to have the meaning "stands on a mountain".

== Greek literature ==
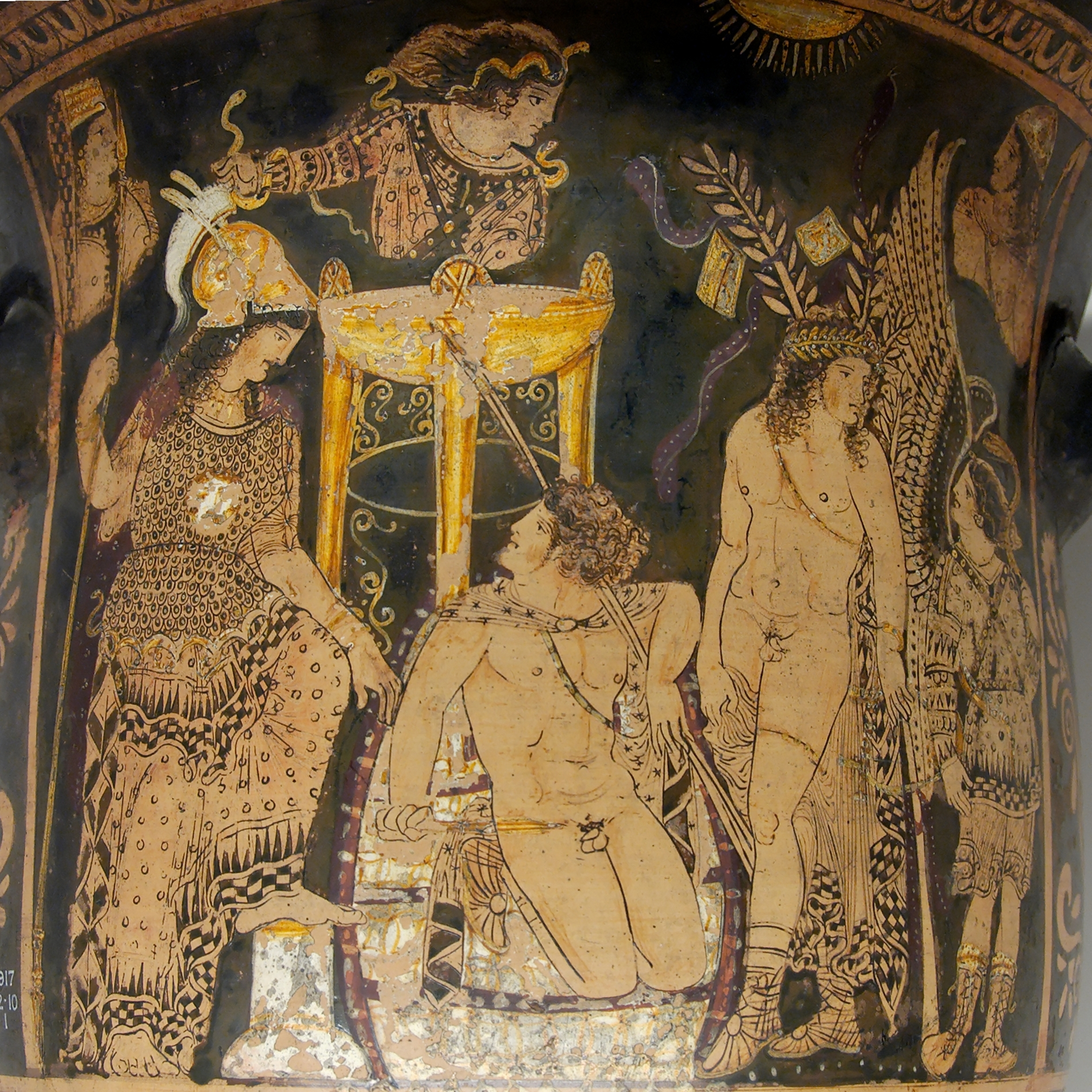
Orestes at Delphi flanked by Athena and Pylades among the Erinyes and priestesses of the oracle, perhaps including Pythia behind the tripod – Paestan red-figured bell-krater, c. 330 BC

=== Homer ===
In the Homeric telling of the story, Orestes is a member of the doomed house of Atreus, which is descended from Tantalus and Niobe. He is absent from Mycenae when his father, Agamemnon, returns from the Trojan War with the Trojan princess Cassandra as his concubine and thus not present for Agamemnon's murder by Aegisthus, the lover of his wife, Clytemnestra. Seven years later Orestes returns from Athens and avenges his father's death by slaying both Aegisthus and his own mother, Clytemnestra.

In the Odyssey Orestes is held up as a favorable example to Telemachus, whose mother, Penelope, is plagued by suitors.

=== Pindar ===
In Pindar's version, the young Orestes was saved by his nurse Arsinoe (Laodamia) or his sister Electra, who conveyed him out of the country when Clytemnestra wished to kill him. In the familiar theme of the hero's early eclipse and exile, he escaped to Phanote on Mount Parnassus, where King Strophius took charge of him.

In his twentieth year, he was urged by Electra to return home and avenge his father's death. He returned home, along with his first cousin Pylades, son of Anaxibia (sister to Agamemnon) and Strophius.

== Greek drama ==
The story of Orestes was the subject of the Oresteia of Aeschylus (Agamemnon, Choephori, Eumenides), of the Electra of Sophocles, and of the Electra, Iphigeneia in Tauris, Iphigenia at Aulis and Orestes, all of Euripides. He also appears in Euripides' Andromache.

=== Aeschylus ===
In Aeschylus's Eumenides, Orestes goes mad after killing his mother and is pursued by the Erinyes (Furies), whose duty it is to punish any violation of the ties of family piety. He takes refuge in the temple at Delphi; but, even though Apollo had ordered him to kill his mother, the god is powerless to protect Orestes from the consequences. At last Athena receives him on the Acropolis of Athens and arranges a formal trial of the case before twelve judges, including herself. The Erinyes demand their victim; Orestes asserts that it was indeed he who killed his mother, though he was acting on the orders of Apollo. At the close of the trial, Athena votes on the verdict last, announcing that she is for acquittal; the votes are counted and the result is a tie, forcing an acquittal in accordance with the rules previously stipulated by Athena. The Erinyes, who insisted on Orestes' responsibility in the murder, are converted into the Eumenides, who now offer him wisdom and counsel. They are then propitiated by the establishment of a new ritual, in which they are worshipped as "Semnai Theai", "Venerable Goddesses", and Orestes dedicates an altar to Athena Areia.

=== Euripides ===
As Aeschylus tells it, Orestes' punishment for matricide ended after a trial, but according to Euripides, in order to escape the persecutions of the Erinyes, Orestes was ordered by Apollo to go to Tauris, carry off the statue of Artemis that had fallen from the heavens, and bring it to Athens. Orestes traveled to Tauris with Pylades, where the pair were at once imprisoned by the people, among whom the custom was to sacrifice all Greek strangers in honor of Artemis. The priestess of Artemis, whose duty it was to perform the sacrifice, was Orestes' sister Iphigenia. She offered to release him if he would carry home a letter from her to Greece; he refused to go, but he implored Pylades to deliver the letter while he stayed to be slain. After a conflict of mutual affection, Pylades at last yielded, but the brother and sister finally recognized each other due to the letter, and all three escaped together, carrying with them the image of Artemis.

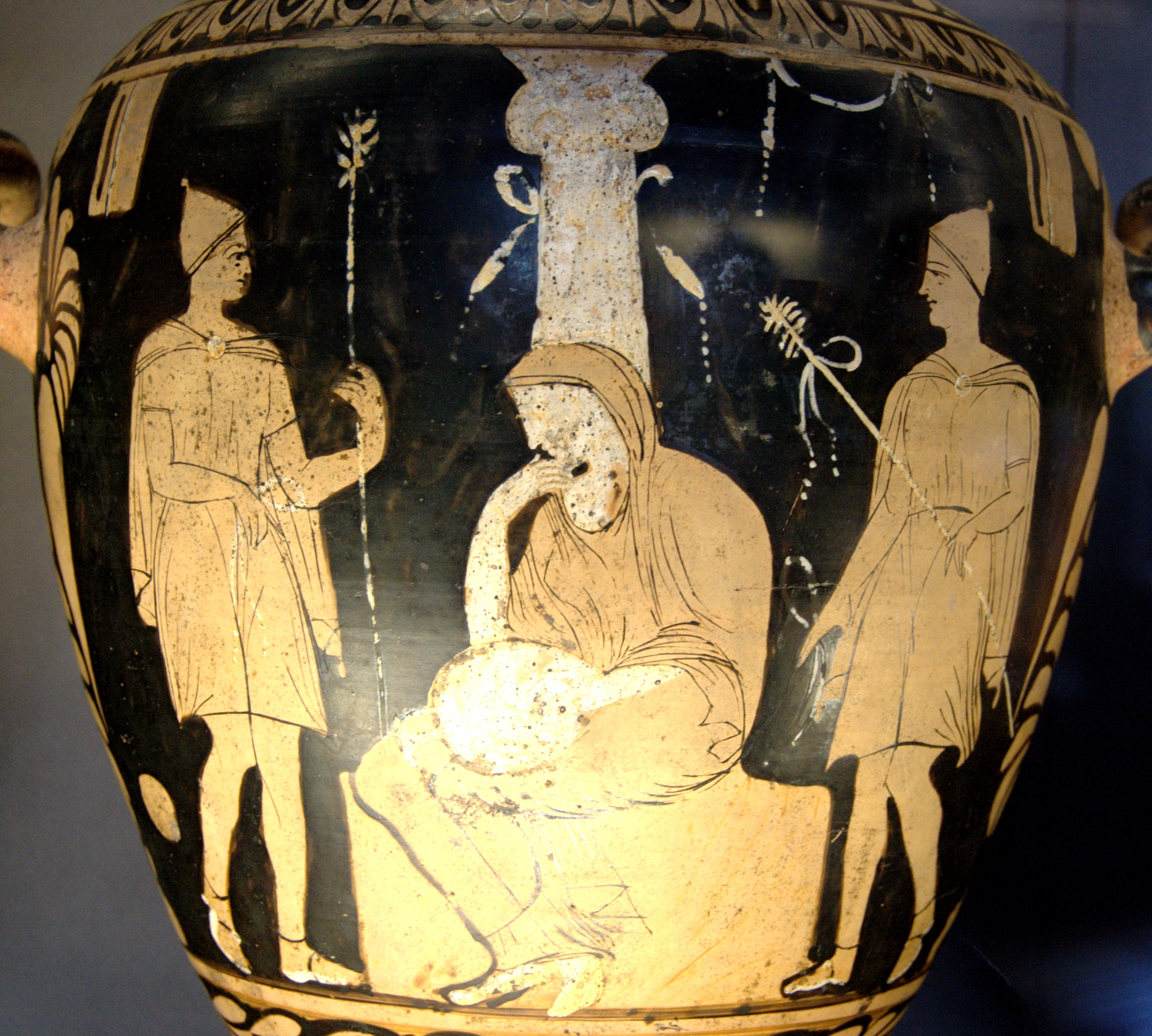
Orestes, Elektra, and Pylades at the tomb of Agamemnon - Campanian red-figure hydria, c. 330 BC

== Other literature and media ==
After his return to Greece, Orestes took possession of his father's kingdom of Mycenae (killing his half-brother Aletes, who was the son of Clytemestra and Aegisthus), to which were added Argos and Laconia. Orestes was said to have died of a snakebite in Arcadia. His body was conveyed to Sparta for burial (where he was the object of a cult) or, according to a Roman legend, to Aricia, when it was removed to Rome (Servius on Aeneid, ii. 116).

Before the Trojan War, Orestes was to marry his first cousin Hermione, daughter of Menelaus and Helen. Things soon changed after Orestes committed matricide: Menelaus then gave his daughter to Neoptolemus, son of Achilles and Deidamia. According to Euripides' play Andromache, Orestes slew Neoptolemus just outside a temple and took off with Hermione. He seized Argos and Arcadia after their thrones had become vacant, becoming ruler of all the Peloponnesus. His son by Hermione, Tisamenus, became ruler after him but was eventually killed by the Heracleidae.

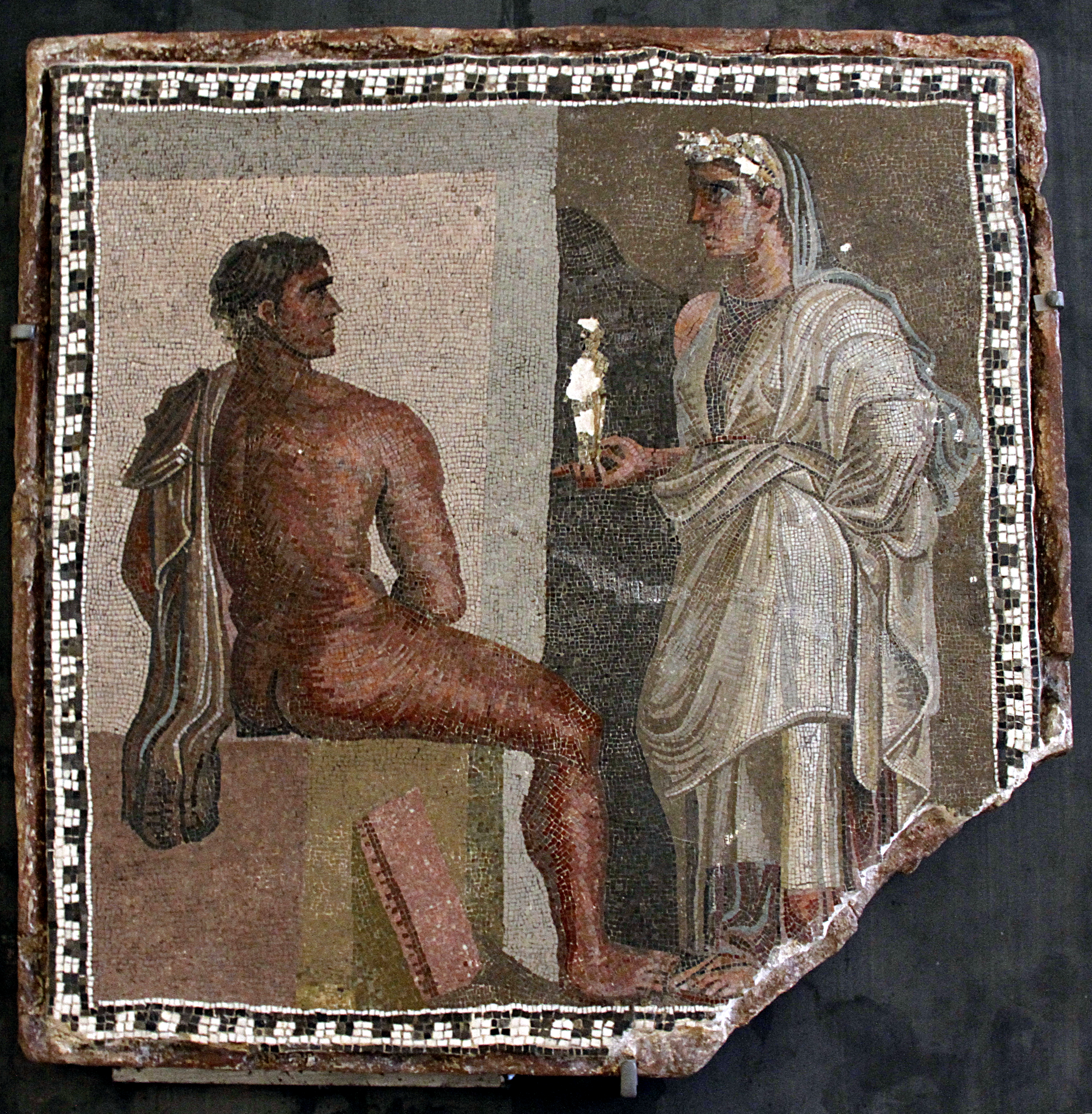
Orestes and Iphigeneia on an antique mosaic, Musei Capitolini

There is extant a Latin epic poem, consisting of about 1000 hexameters, called Orestes Tragoedia, which has been ascribed to Dracontius of Carthage.

Orestes appears also to be a dramatic prototype for all persons whose crime is mitigated by extenuating circumstances. These legends belong to an age when higher ideas of law and of social duty were being established; the implacable blood-feud of primitive society gives place to a fair trial, and in Athens, when the votes of the judges are evenly divided, mercy prevails.

In one version of the story of Telephus, the infant Orestes was kidnapped by King Telephus, who used him as leverage in his demand that Achilles heal him.

According to some sources Orestes fathered an illegitimate son, Penthilus, by his half-sister, Erigone. In other accounts he married her. According to one source Tisamenus is his child with Erigone.

For modern treatments see the Oresteia in the arts and popular culture.

== Reported remains ==
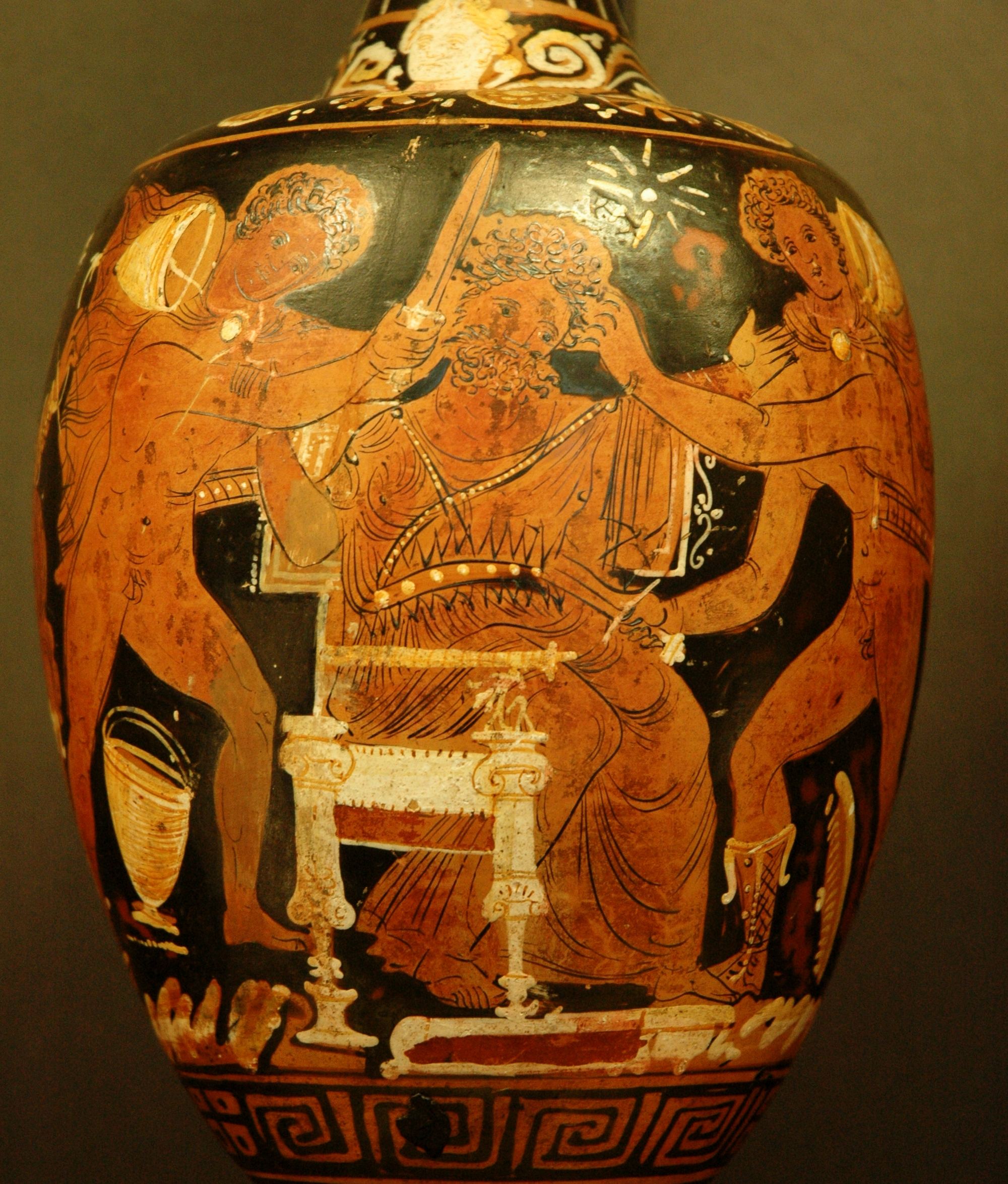
Murder of Aegisthus by Orestes and Pylades - red-figure Apulian oinochoe (wine jug), c. 430-300 BC

=== Brought to Sparta ===
In The History by Herodotus, the Oracle of Delphi foretold that the Spartans could not defeat the Tegeans until they moved the bones of Orestes to Sparta. Lichas discovered the body, which measured 7 cubits long (311.5 cm if 1 cubit is 44.5 cm). Thus, Orestes would have been a giant. These remains could have belonged to a huge animal from the Pleistocene epoch. Huge bones found in caves in nearby areas of Greece have been attributed to horses (Equus abeli), mammoths, elephants, deer, bovids and cetaceans.

=== The ashes of Orestes as Pignora Imperii ===
Maurus Servius Honoratus, an early 4th century grammarian, regards the ashes of Orestes (Cineres Orestis) as one of the seven pignora imperii of the Roman empire in his In Vergilii Aeneidem commentarii ('Commentary on Virgil's Aeneid'). Alongside the ashes, Servius lists the other six pignora: the stone of the Mother of the Gods, the terracotta chariot of the Veientines, the ancile, the sceptre of Priam, the veil of Iliona and the palladium.

The ashes were kept at the Temple of Jupiter Optimus Maximus on the Capitolium.

== Orestes and Pylades ==
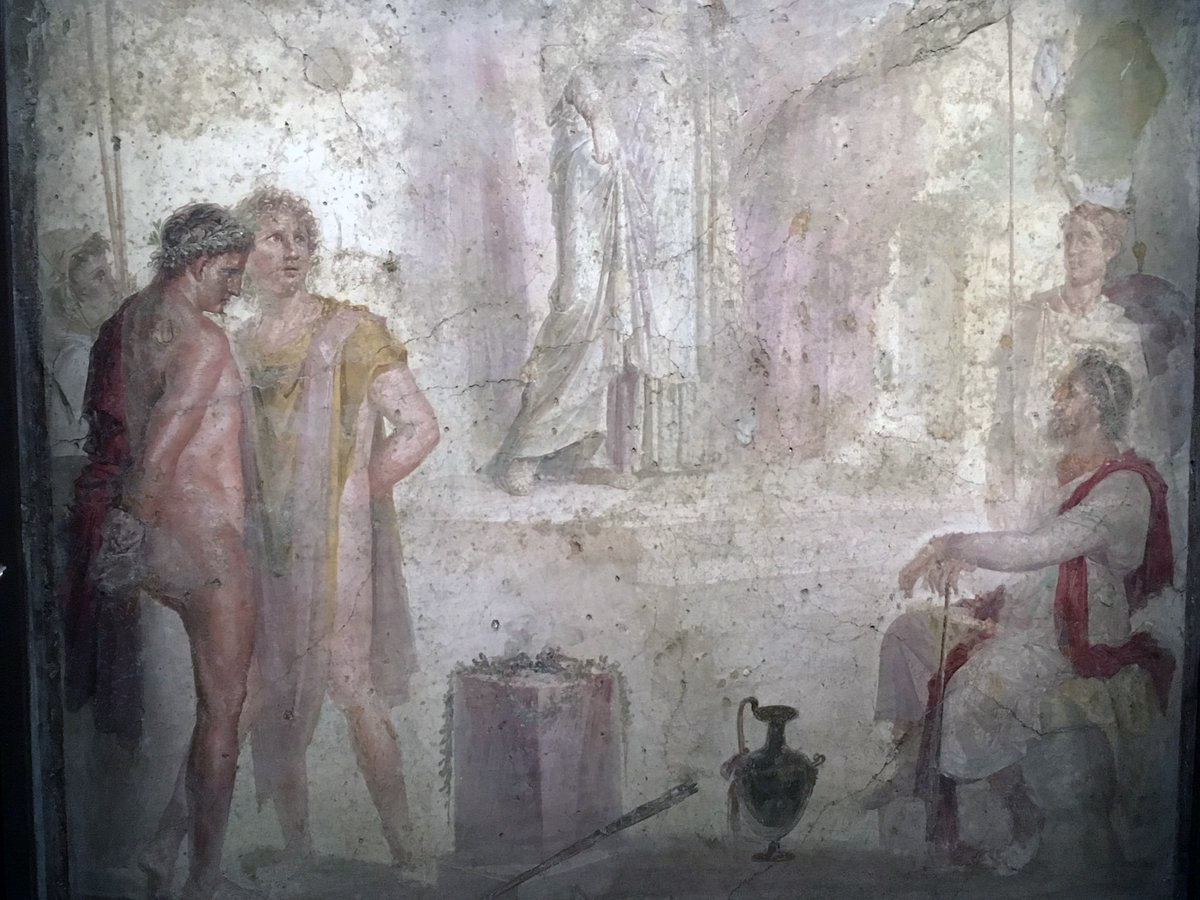
An antique fresco in Pompeii depicting a scene from 'Iphigenia in Tauris' showing Orestes, Pylades and King Thoas

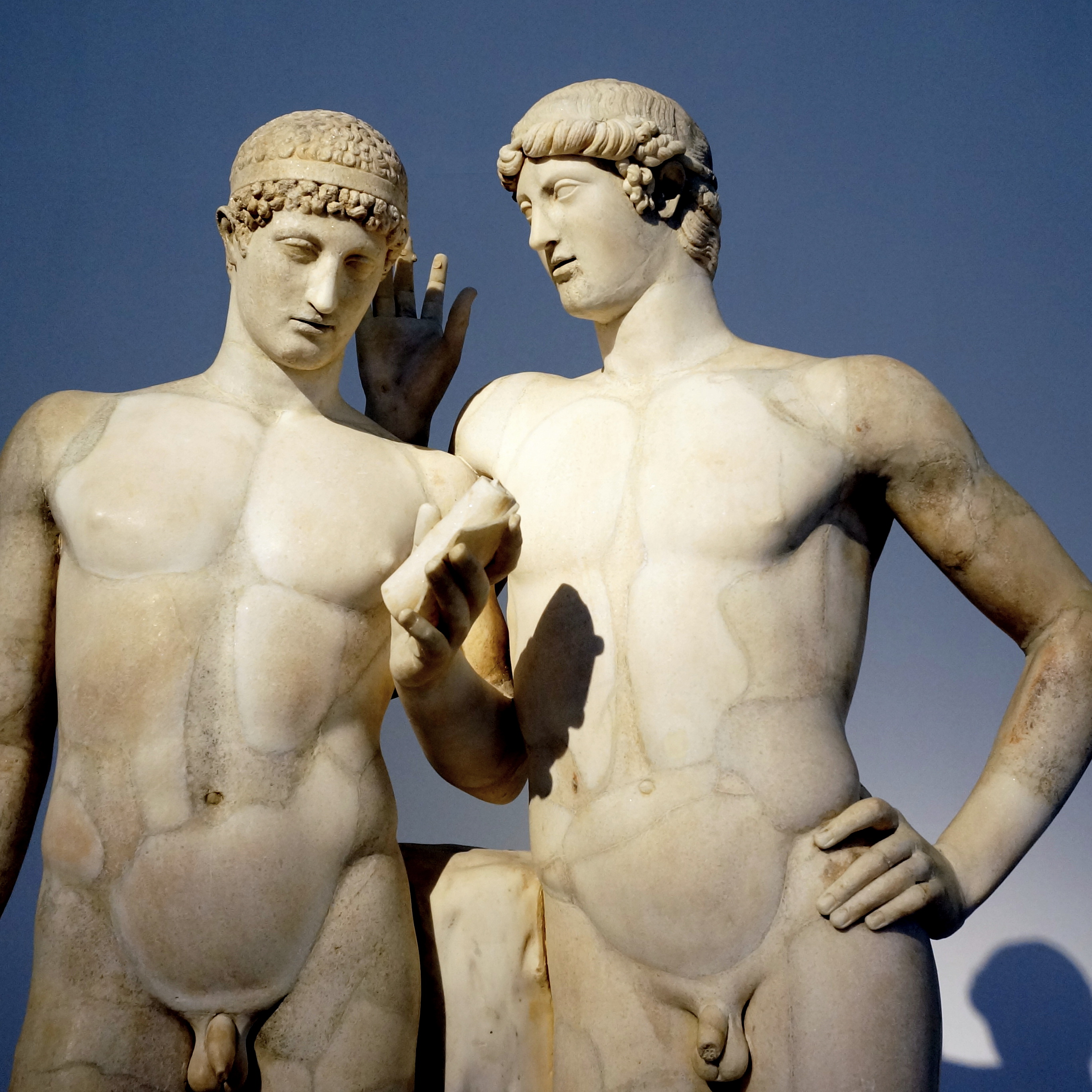
Orestes and Pylades, attributed to Pasiteles school

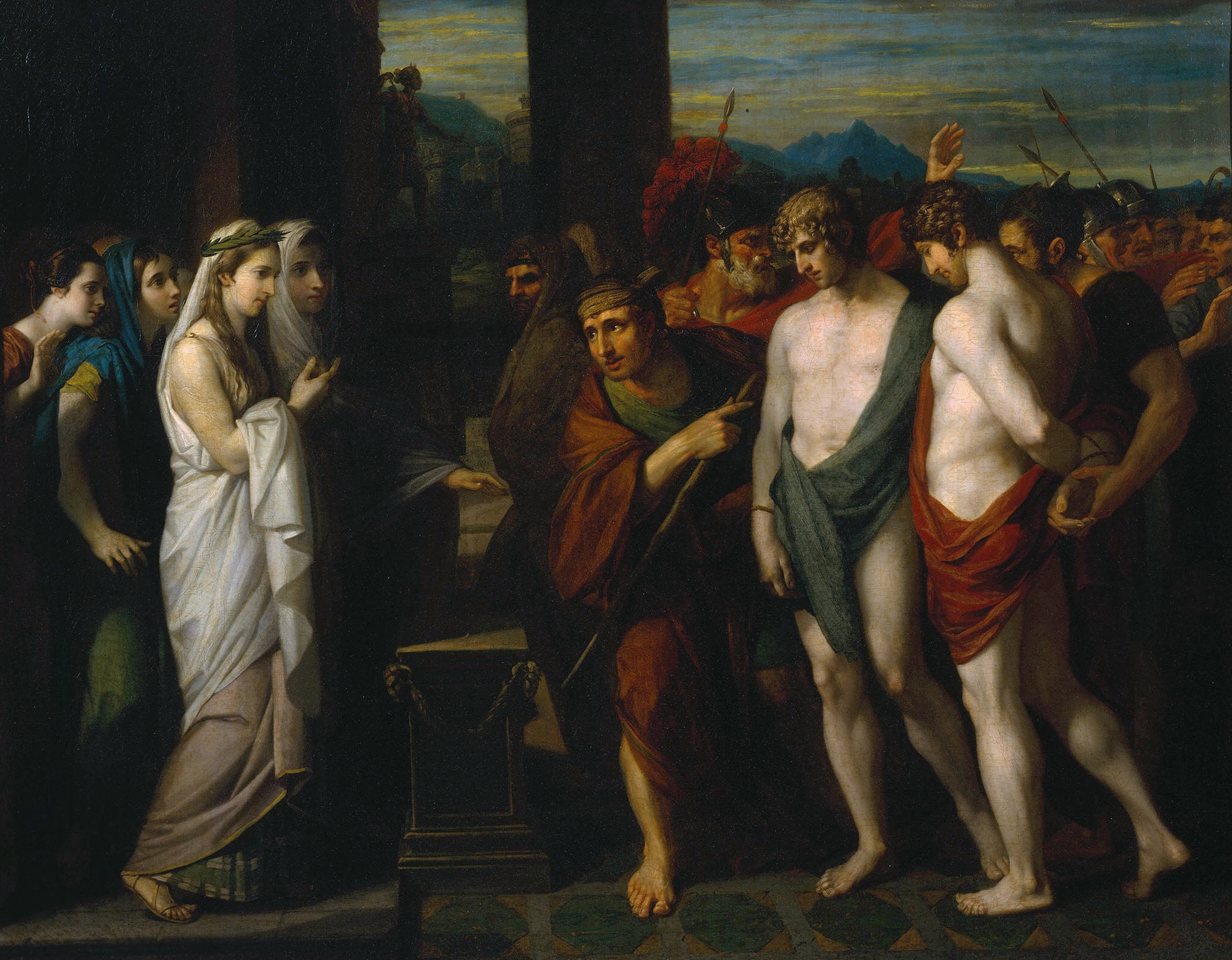
Pylades and Orestes Brought as Victims before Iphigenia, by Benjamin West, 1766

The relationship between Orestes and Pylades has been presented by some authors of the Roman era (not by classic Greek tragedians) as romantic or homoerotic. A dialogue entitled Erotes ("Affairs of the Heart") and attributed to Lucian compares the merits and advantages of heterosexuality and homoeroticism, and Orestes and Pylades are presented as the principal representatives of homoerotic friendship:

Taking the love god as the mediator of their emotions for each other, they sailed together as it were on the same vessel of life...nor did they restrict their affectionate friendship to the limits of Hellas....as soon as they set foot on the land of the Tauride, the Fury of matricides was there to welcome the strangers, and, when the natives stood around them, the one was struck to the ground by his usual madness and lay there, but Pylades "did wipe away the foam and tend his frame and shelter him with a fine well-woven robe," thus showing the feelings not merely of a lover, but also of a father. But when it had been decided that, while one remained to be killed, the other should depart for Mycenae to bear a letter, each wished to remain for the sake of the other, considering that he himself lived in the survival of his friend. But Orestes refused to take the letter, claiming Pylades was the fitter person to do so, and thus showed himself almost to be the lover rather than the beloved.

L'Orestie d'Eschyle (47)

In 1734 George Frederic Handel's opera Oreste (based on Giangualberto Barlocci's Roman libretto of 1723) was premiered in London's Covent Garden.

L'Orestie d'Eschyle (1913–1923) is an opera in three parts by Darius Milhaud based on The Oresteia triptych by Aeschylus in a French translation by his collaborator Paul Claudel.

== Sanctuary of Maniae ==
Pausanias writes that at the road from Megalopolis to Messene there was a sanctuary of goddesses Maniae (meaning madness). Citizens said that it was there that madness overtook Orestes.

Regnal titles
Preceded by Cylarabes	King of Argos	Succeeded by Tisamenus
Preceded by Menelaus	Mythical Kings of Sparta c. 1200 BC	Succeeded by Tisamenus
