= Evidence of Heaven =

Studio album by Faith and the Muse
- Released: July 27, 1999, 2000 re-release, 2001 re-release
- Recorded: May – July 1999 at Wisperthal
- Genre: Gothic rock, darkwave
- Length: 50:02
- Label: Neue Ästhetik Multimedia (1996), Mercyground Label (2000), Metropolis Records (2001)
- Producer: Faith and the Muse

Faith and the Muse chronology
Annwyn, Beneath the Waves (1996)	Evidence of Heaven (1999)	Vera Causa (2001)

Professional ratings
Review scores
Source	Rating
Allmusic	3/5 stars

Evidence of Heaven is the third studio album by Faith and the Muse.

== Track listing ==
No.	Title	Length
1.	"Joy"	0:42
2.	"Scars Flown Proud"	4:24
3.	"Shattered in Aspect"	4:09
4.	"The Chorus of the Furies"	3:37
5.	"Patience Worth"	3:42
6.	"Dead Leaf Echo"	5:41
7.	"Porphyrogene"	2:17
8.	"Through the Pale Door"	4:09
9.	"And Laugh - But Smile No More"	1:34
10.	"Plague Dance"	3:23
11.	"Denn Die Todten Reiten Schnell"	4:58
12.	"Importune Me No More"	3:45
13.	"Reine La Belle"	4:31
14.	"Old Souls"	3:10
Total length:		50:02

== Credits ==
- All instruments and voices performed by William Faith and Monica Richards (except "Joy")
- All titles composed by Faith and the Muse © and p Elyrian Music, BMI, 1999 except:
  "Old Souls", Written by Paul Williams
  "Importune Me No More", Lyrics most likely written by Elizabeth I, late 16th century
  "Joy", Performed by Joy Richards from her Classical repertoire, 1959
- Recorded May – July 1999 by William Faith at Wisperthal, Los Angeles, California and produced by Faith and the Muse except
  "Denn Die Todten Reiten Schnell", Recorded Fall 1996 at The Eyesocket, Venice, California - Produced by Faith and the Muse and Chad Blinman
- Layout, Artwork and Design by Monica Richards
  Band Photo by kaRIN
- Original lyrics by Monica Richards, except "Through the Pale Door" and "Denn Die Todten" written by William Faith.
