= Strange Boutique (band) =

American gothic rock band

- Origin: Washington, D.C.
- Genres: Gothic rock; ethereal wave; post-punk; dream pop; shoegaze
- Years active: 1987–1994; 2004; 2019–present
- Labels: BoutiqueThings; The Circle Music; Bedazzled
- Formerly of: Madhouse (1983-1987)
- Members: Monica Richards; Steve Willett; Dennis Kane
- Past members: Frederick E. Smith Jr.; Rand Blackwell; Danny Ingram; Mark Shellhaas
- Website: strangeboutiquedc.com; strangeboutique.bandcamp.com

Strange Boutique is a band from Washington, D.C. They were active between the years of 1987 and 1994 and released 4 full-length albums and 2 live albums on the Bedazzled Records label. They are also featured on several compilation albums. Monica Richards, the lead singer of Strange Boutique, later went on to form the underground band Faith and the Muse.

== History ==
=== Early years, Easter Island EP and The Loved One (1987-1991) ===
Monica Richards and drummer Daniel Ingram had formed the band Madhouse in Washington DC in 1983, and throughout its four-year history, had transformed from punk-rock into a melodic mix, featuring the bass playing of Franz Kellner and the guitar work of Fred Smith, who joined the band in 1986 after leaving Beefeater.

In 1987, Madhouse sold their name to a jazz ensemble who was on a major label. Through a classified ad in the weekly DC City Paper, bassist Steve Willett joined the group; the chemistry was instant and within a short time an entirely new set of songs was written. As Strange Boutique, the band's material incorporated elements of the DC post-punk scene and melody. Developing a guitar-driven ethereal pop sound with world music influences, Strange Boutique was described as having "a swirling, soaring guitar, ethereal vocals, and a pulsating rhythm section."

Early recordings of “Step Softly” and “Feast Your Eyes” wound up on DC-based compilations and provided a calling card for the new lineup and sound. The band's first EP, Easter Island, featuring the pulsing lead track, “Quicksand Minds" followed in May of 1989. The new record and live shows received local attention. The performances featured a combination of Fred's guitar work, Monica's vocals, and the rhythm section of Danny and Steve.

Following a performance supporting Killing Joke in D.C., the two bands struck an immediate friendship, and KJ gave Strange Boutique the support slot for their next UK shows. The band took the chance and flew to London, performing a number of well-received shows in support of Killing Joke.

In between live shows the band worked constantly on new material. Quickly leaving the early material behind, the group found its stride in yet another new batch of songs. The new stuff had a swagger and a groove... the edges were soaked in reverb and Monica found a place on top of it all. A limited 7” single featuring “A Happy Death” and a cover of Magazine’s “A Song From Under the Floorboards” was released on Y&T records.

Strange Boutique entered the studio in February, 1991 to record their long-awaited debut album The Loved One. The album, which featured a new recording of their EP favorite "Quicksand Minds", was released on their own Bedazzled Records in the Fall of 1991 Around this time, drummer Daniel Ingram left the band to explore his expanding musical interests. He joined England's Swervedriver for their 1992 world tour, and moved to London. Rand Blackwell joins the band as the new drummer.

=== Charm, The Kindest Worlds and breakup (1992-1994) ===
The band recorded and released a new single, In A Heaven with a cover of David Bowie's "Heroes" on the B-side. The band performed extensively, touring the East Coast in support of the release.

In November 1992, Strange Boutique began recording their next record, again for their own Bedazzled Records. The second album, Charm, was released in February 1993. This album is considered the band's favorite; it finds SB in their most classic style.

The group traveled to the West Coast in March 1993 for a tour with This Ascension, as well as a show at San Francisco's House of Usher with Switchblade Symphony. During this tour, the band performed for audiences in California and returned with an increased national fanbase.

1993, though, was a very difficult year for the band. All members experienced personal hardships, and the strain became all too apparent. Strange Boutique continued writing and touring in the ensuing months, but for numerous personal reasons, the band decided to go on a possibly permanent respite. The band entered the studio in November, 1993, one last time to record the last songs written, which became their third and final album, The Kindest Worlds, released in 1994.

When Strange Boutique said farewell in 1993, the band scattered across the country and found new creative outlets. Singer Monica Richards formed Faith and the Muse, guitarist Fred Smith landed in Blaxmyth and bassist Steve Willett joined DC guitar ensemble Tone. Drummer Rand Blackwell retreated to the mountains of North Carolina.

=== First reunion and Collection release (2004) ===
On Saturday, July 3, 2004, Strange Boutique celebrated a brief reunion at The Black Cat in Washington DC. The band played with This Ascension and Siddal. This one-off show coincided with the release of Strange Boutique: The Collection - 1988-1994, on Metropolis Records.

This event would be the last time they performed with Fred "Freak" Smith on guitar.

=== Fred Smith's death, reunion and band's revival (2017-present) ===
After the death of guitarist Fred “Freak” Smith in 2017, singer Monica Richards and bassist Steve Willett began reminiscing about their love of Fred and the music they wrote with him. This began a dialogue about getting together in Washington DC for an evening of music.

In 2019, Strange Boutique reunited to begin practice for a single show in honor of Fred, yet something unexpected happened... While rehearsing with Dennis Kane who was filling in on guitar, it became apparent that even after such an extended hiatus, all the music of Strange Boutique came naturally to the new lineup. In June of that year, the club DC9 in Washington DC was the site of a Strange Boutique performance in celebration of Smith's life. Following the reception for the new lineup and the experience of performing together, the band decided to write new material.

Strange Boutique released their first new music in over 15 years, the Jet Stream EP. in 2021.

The band released a new single called "The Night Birds" on November 1st, 2024, from their upcoming fourth record, Let the Lonely Heart Sing, set to be released on June 10th, 2025. This marks their first full record after more than thirty years after their last album, The Kindest Worlds.

== Members ==
- Monica Richards - vocals (1987-1994, 2019-present)
- Frederick "Fred/Freak" Smith - guitar (1987-1994) (died 2017)
- Steve Willett - bass guitar (1987-1994, 2019- present)
- Dennis Kane - guitar (2019-present)
- Rand Blackwell - drums (1991-1994)
- Danny Ingram - drums (1987-1991)

== Discography ==
- Easter Island EP (1989)
- The Loved One (1991)
- Charm (1993)
- The Kindest Worlds (1994)
- The Strange Boutique Collection|The Collection: 1988-1994 (2004)
- Jet Stream EP (2021)
- Let the Lonely Heart Sing (2025)
