= Ankoku butoh =

ankoku butoh

Studio album by Faith and the Muse
- Released: October 31, 2009
- Genre: Gothic rock
- Length: 45:50
- Label: Danse Macabre
- Producer: Faith and the Muse

Faith and the Muse chronology
The Burning Season (2003)	ankoku butoh (2009)

:ankoku butoh: is the fifth studio album by Gothic rock band Faith and the Muse. It comprises one CD and one DVD. It was the band's first release on the Danse Macabre label.

Thematically, the album reflects elements of Shinto and Japanese culture. In accordance with this, the booklet accompanying the album was printed back-to-front.

== Track listing (CD) ==
_{All tracks by Faith and the Muse}

No.	Title	Length
1.	"The Woman of the Snow"	2:45
2.	"Kamimukae"	1:08
3.	"Blessed"	3:56
4.	"Battle Hymn"	4:24
5.	"Bushido"	2:38
6.	"Nine Dragons"	4:35
7.	"Harai"	1:34
8.	"When We Go Dark"	4:26
9.	"The Red Crown"	4:21
10.	"Kodama"	3:36
11.	"She Waits By the Well"	4:25
12.	"Sovereign"	4:26
13.	"To Be Continued"	3:36
Total length:		45:50

== DVD track Listing ==
Videos

1. Battle Hymn (album video) (link opens in a new page)
2. Blessed (album video)
3. Interview with the band

Live Concert Film

1. Scars Flown Proud
2. The Silver Circle
3. Bait & Switch / Sredni Vashtar
4. Relic Song
5. Shattered in Aspect
6. Paul Mercer: Solo
7. The Burning Season
8. The Trauma Coil
9. All Lovers Lost / Arianrhod
10. Fade and Remain
11. Sparks
12. Cantus

Rarities & Extras

1. Sparks (1994 Video)
2. Annwyn, Beneath the Waves (live at WGT 1998)
3. The Burning Season (2004 Video)
4. Into My Own (2007 Video)
5. Anafae (Official Trailer)

== Personnel ==
- All instruments and voices performed by William Faith and Monica Richards except:
- Violin by Paul Mercer • Cello by Marzia Rangel
- Dragon Artwork by Jim Neely
- Produced by Faith and the Muse
- Recorded by William Faith @ Zone 0, Los Angeles, CA
- Mixed and mastered by Chad Blinman @ The Eye Socket, Los Angeles, California
