= Arianrhod RPG =

Tabletop role-playing game

- Arianrhod RPG renewal cover (paperback)
- Designers: Takeshi Kikuchi, F.E.A.R.
- Publishers: Fujimi Shobo, Game Field
- Publication: 2004
- Genres: fantasy
- Systems: custom

Arianrhod RPG is a Japanese fantasy role-playing game released in 2004. At present, Arianrhod RPG is one of the most popular traditional RPG in Japan along with Sword World 2.0, Alshard and Dungeons & Dragons. The related books including rulebooks, supplements, replays and novels were published 59 books until November 2010.

The game's flavor is similar to that of MMORPGs. For example, guild skills shared by the party, skills similar to Final Fantasy XI's combos, and manga-like illustrations.

The basic setting's world, named Erindyll continent, is an orthodox fantasy world. In 2008, the new series Arianrhod Saga began, and the new setting of another continent named Aldion was provided for a campaign setting suitable for war chronicle stories. Arianrhod Saga contains several series of side stories named Across, Break, Concerto (manga), Death March, Étude, Fanbook (a replay with a drama CD), and several novels.

Arianrhod RPG is known for several voice actors such as Noriko Rikimaru, Ema Kogure, Naoki Yanagi, Kanako Sakai, Megumi Kojima, and Miyu Ohtake playing in official game sessions. These session logs are commercially published as replays.

== Game mechanics ==
=== Success rolls ===
Arianrhod RPG uses only 6 sided dice. To determine whether the action is successful or not the player rolls only nd6 (basically 2d6, skills and fates increase the number of dice), if the total of the dice rolled by the player and ability adjustments is more than or equal to difficulty score the action succeeds. Hero points are called fates, power of the fortune goddess "Arianrhod". Using fate points enable re-roll, increase the number of dice or the other effects. Every player character gains 5 or 6(human only) fate points at the start. If a player rolls over two dice that show a 6, the role is critical success, the number of dice to determine damage are also increased same as the number of dice that show a 6.

=== Classes ===
Arianrhod RPG used a dual-class system. Players can choose from 4 base classes (Warrior, Acolyte, Mage, Thief) for the main class, the definer of the core abilities. Players also choose from 4 base classes plus Alchemist, Bard, Dancer, Gunslinger, Monk, Ninja, Ranger, Sage, Samurai, Summoner and regional classes (Gladiator, Healer, Shaman, Viking, Forecaster and Preacher) for the support class. Moreover, 12 advanced classes for high-level characters, Warlord, Knight, Priest, Paladin, Wizard, Sorcerer, Explorer, Scout, Tamer, Dragoon, Highlander and Mentor are present.
