= Pignora imperii =

Sacred tokens in ancient Rome

The pignora imperii ("pledges of rule") were objects that were supposed to guarantee the continued imperium of ancient Rome. One late source lists seven. The sacred tokens most commonly regarded as such were: the Palladium, the wooden image of Minerva (Greek Athena) that the Romans claimed had been rescued from the fall of Troy and was in the keeping of the Vestals; the sacred fire of Vesta tended by the Vestals, which was never allowed to go out; and the ancilia, the twelve shields of Mars, wielded by his priests—the Salii—in their processions, dating to the time of Numa Pompilius (the second king of Rome).

In the later Roman Empire, the maintenance of the Altar of Victory in the Curia took on a similar symbolic value for those such as Symmachus who were trying to preserve Rome's religious traditions in the face of Christian hegemony. The extinguishing of the fire of Vesta by the Christian emperor Theodosius I is one of the events that mark the abolition of Rome's ancestral religion and the imposition of Christianity as a state religion that excluded all others.

In late antiquity, some narratives of the founding of Constantinople claim that Constantine I, the first emperor to convert to Christianity, transferred the pignora imperii to the new capital. Though the historicity of this transferral may be in doubt, the claim indicates the symbolic value of the tokens.

== Servius' list ==
The 4th-century scholar Servius notes in his commentary to Vergil's Aeneid that "there were seven tokens (pignora) which maintain Roman rule (imperium Romanum)," and gives the following list:

1. the needle of the Mother of the Gods (Acus Matris Deum), kept in the Temple of Cybele on the Palatine Hill; (Note: It is disputed what the item was precisely. Meteor showers during the Second Punic War motivated the Romans, after consulting the Sibylline Books, to introduce the cult of the Great Mother of Ida (Magna Mater Idaea, also known as Cybele) to the city. With the aid of their ally Attalus I (241-197 BC), they brought the goddess' most important image, a large black stone that was said to have fallen from the sky, from Pessinus to Rome (Livy 10.4-11.18). This was called a baetylus.)
2. the terracotta four-horse chariot brought from Veii (Quadriga Fictilis Veientanorum), supposed to have been commissioned by the last king of Rome Tarquinius Superbus, which was displayed on the roof of the Temple of Jupiter Optimus Maximus on the Capitolium;
3. the ashes of Orestes (Cineres Orestis), kept at the same temple;
4. the scepter of Priam (Sceptrum Priami), brought to Rome by Aeneas;
5. the veil of Ilione (Velum Ilionae), daughter of Priam, another Trojan token attributed to Aeneas;
6. the Palladium, kept in the Temple of Vesta;
7. the Ancile, the sacred shield of Mars Gradivus (Note: "He who walks into battle") given to Numa Pompilius, kept in the Regia hidden among eleven other identical copies to confuse would-be thieves. All twelve shields were ritually paraded each year through Rome by the Salii during the Agonum Martialis.

Classicist Alan Cameron notes that three of these supposed tokens were fictional (the ashes, scepter, and veil) and are not named in any other sources as sacred guarantors of Rome. The other four objects were widely attested in Latin literature, but have left no archaeological trace. In the 1720s excavations of the Palatine Hill by Francesco Bianchini, he noted a stone matching the description of Cybele's needle; however its ultimate fate is unknown, and it was likely destroyed.

== See also ==
- Translatio imperii
- Palladium (protective image), the general concept
