= Faith and the Muse =

American rock band

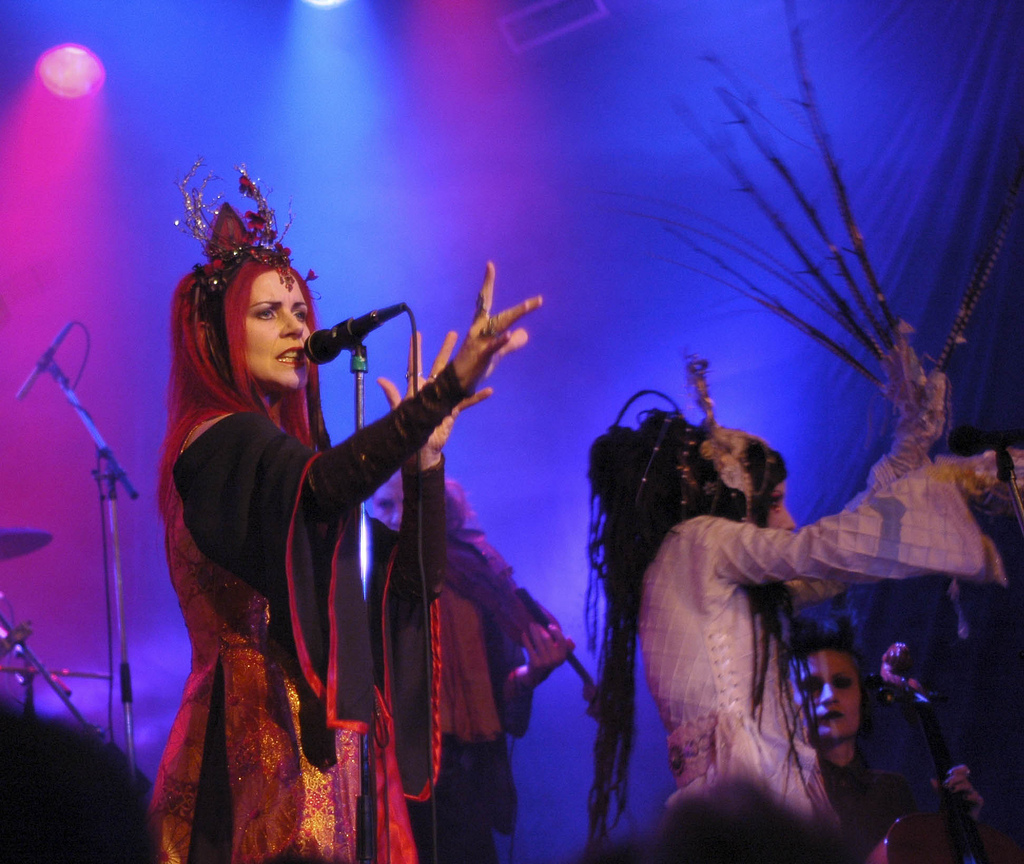

Background information
- Origin: United States
- Genres: Gothic rock; dark wave; ethereal wave
- Years active: 1994–present
- Labels: Metropolis Records, Danse Macabre Records
- Members: William Faith; Monica Richards

Faith and the Muse is an American rock band composed of Monica Richards and William Faith. Their music encompasses many genres, from folk music to dark wave, drawing on many sources and influences, notably Dead Can Dance. Richards is the primary singer, although Faith sings one or two tracks on each album. Their influences include dark alternative, gothic rock, Celtic, and other folk influences. Welsh and Irish mythology have often served as inspiration to many of the band's songs.

== Biography ==
Monica Richards, a native of Washington, D.C., is a musician/artist/poet/scholar. She met William Faith in 1992 when her band, Strange Boutique, opened for Shadow Project in Norfolk, VA. Before starting Faith and the Muse, both had had experience in the gothic rock and post-punk culture of the 1980s. Richards had sung for the band Strange Boutique, while Faith had performed with gothic/death rock icons Shadow Project, Christian Death, Mephisto Walz, and Sex Gang Children. Faith and the Muse was started in 1993 with Richards and Faith exchanging tapes while Richards was still living on the east coast. Shortly thereafter she moved to Los Angeles where the duo was based.

They recorded their debut album Elyria in March 1994, following it in 1995 with the concept album Annwyn, Beneath the Waves, based around Welsh mythology. The band followed this up with an extensive touring schedule, playing with both guest musicians as a full line-up and as an acoustic duo - the latter tour documented on the Vera Causa album in 2001.

Their third album, Evidence of Heaven (1999), marked the end of the first creative phase of Faith and the Muse. They then modernised both their image and their overall sound, the result appearing on their 2003 album The Burning Season - their first on Metropolis Records.

Their most recent efforts were 2009's :ankoku butoh:, a compact disc/dvd/book release, steeped in Japanese myth, sound and atmosphere. This was followed by the : shoumei : dvd in 2010, capturing the band performing during the :ankoku butoh: tour in Houston, TX.

They have toured extensively in North America, South America and Europe, and have performed at major music festivals such as Wave-Gotik-Treffen and M'Era Luna in Germany, several Whitby Gothic Weekends in the UK and at Convergence festival 4 and 13 in the U.S. Their live performances feature a full band with a rotating line-up of live musicians.

Outside of the band, Faith and Richards are permaculture designers, whose most public project was Ars Terra - the retrofit their home into a practical example of a sustainable suburban homestead.

Richards has also recently been active contributing vocals to The Eden House - a collaborative musical project initiated by Tony Pettitt (Fields of the Nephilim and formerly of Rubicon) and Steve Carey (formerly of This Burning Effigy) and involving a varied collection of guest musicians and vocalists.

== Discography ==
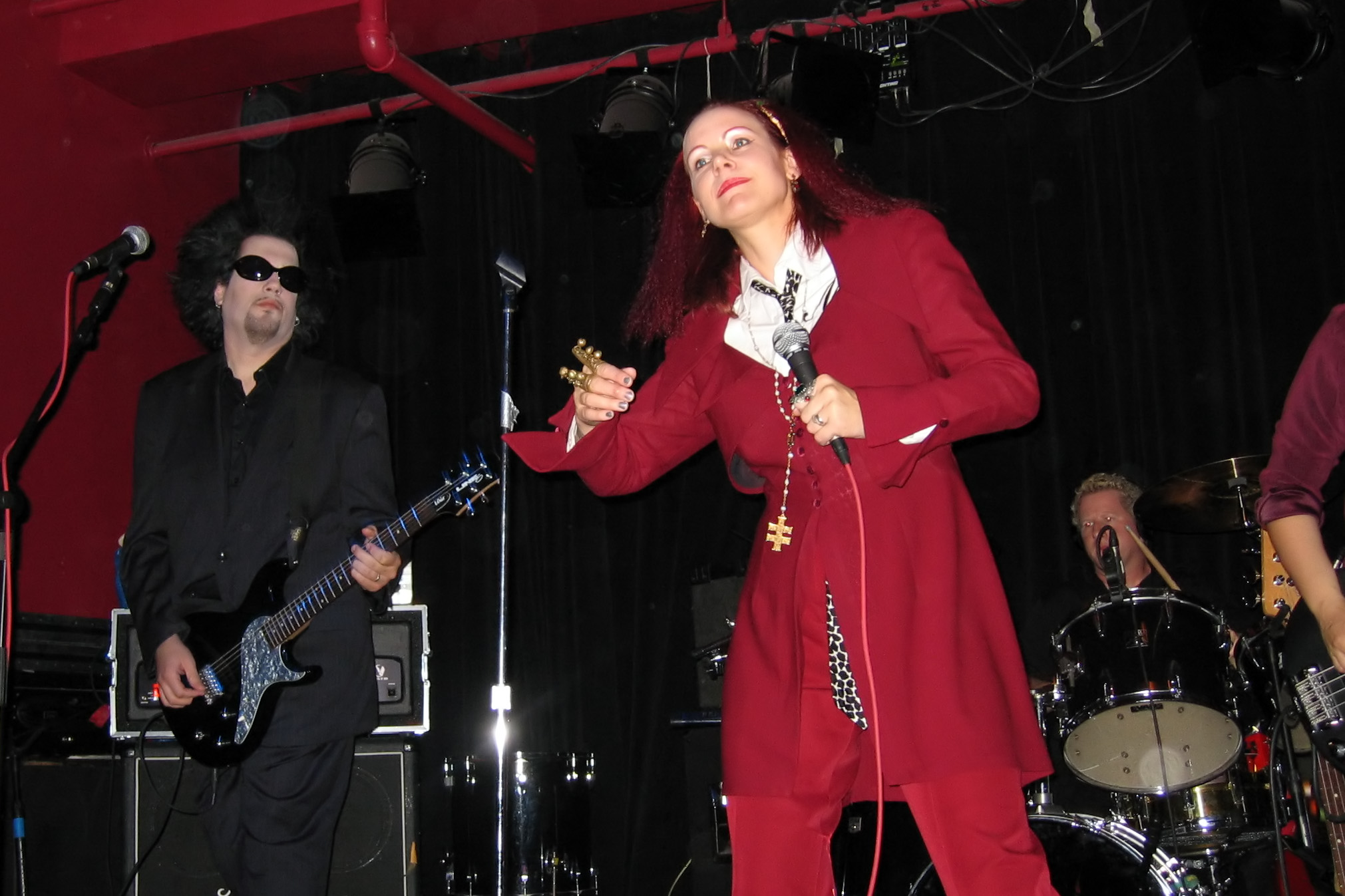
Faith and the Muse performing in support of their 1994 album 'Elyria'

- Elyria (TESS Records) (1994)
- Annwyn, Beneath the Waves (TESS Records) (1996)
- Live in Mainz (16.10.1997) (1997)
- Evidence of Heaven (Neue Ästhetik Multimedia) (1999)
- Vera Causa (Metropolis Records) (2001)
- The Burning Season (Metropolis Records) (2003)
- Ankoku butoh (Danse Macabre) (2009)
