= Palladium (classical antiquity) =

Protective cult image in Greek and Roman mythology

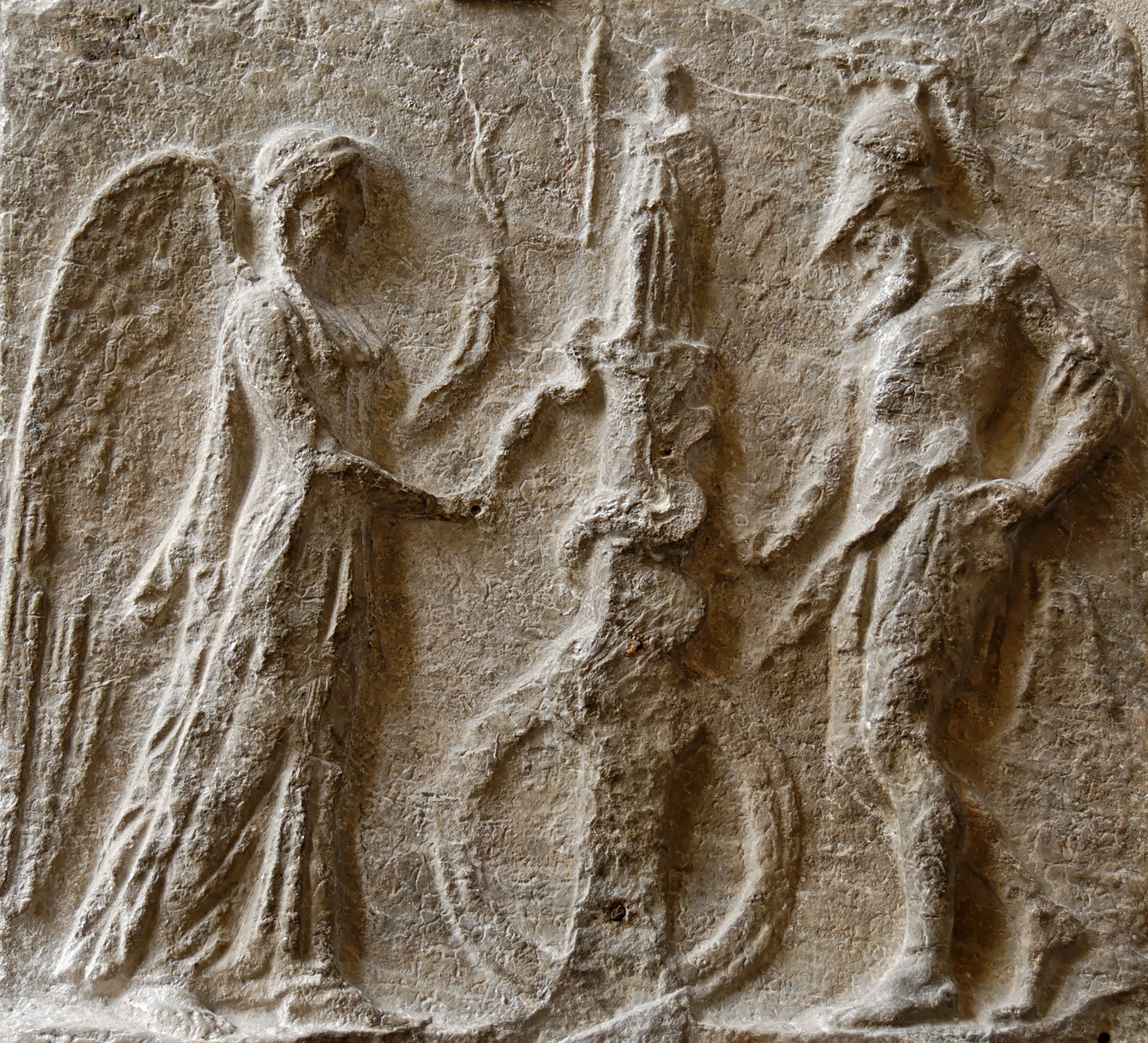
Nike (Victory) offers an egg to a snake entwined around a column surmounted by the Trojan Palladium. (Marble bas relief, Roman copy of the late 1st century AD. After a neo-Attic original of the Hellenistic era.)

In Greek and Roman mythology, the Palladium or Palladion (Greek Παλλάδιον (Palladion), Latin Palladium) was a cult image of great antiquity on which the safety of Troy and later Rome was said to depend, the wooden statue (xoanon) of Pallas Athena that Odysseus and Diomedes stole from the citadel of Troy and which was later taken to the future site of Rome by Aeneas. The Roman story is related in Virgil's Aeneid and other works. Rome possessed an object regarded as the actual Palladium for several centuries; it was in the care of the Vestal Virgins for nearly all this time.

Since around 1600, the word palladium has been used figuratively to mean anything believed to provide protection or safety, and in particular in Christian contexts a sacred relic or icon believed to have a protective role in military contexts for a whole city, people or nation. Such beliefs first become prominent in the Eastern church in the period after the reign of the Byzantine Emperor Justinian I, and later spread to the Western church. Palladia were carried in procession around the walls of besieged cities and sometimes carried into battle.

== The Trojan Palladium ==
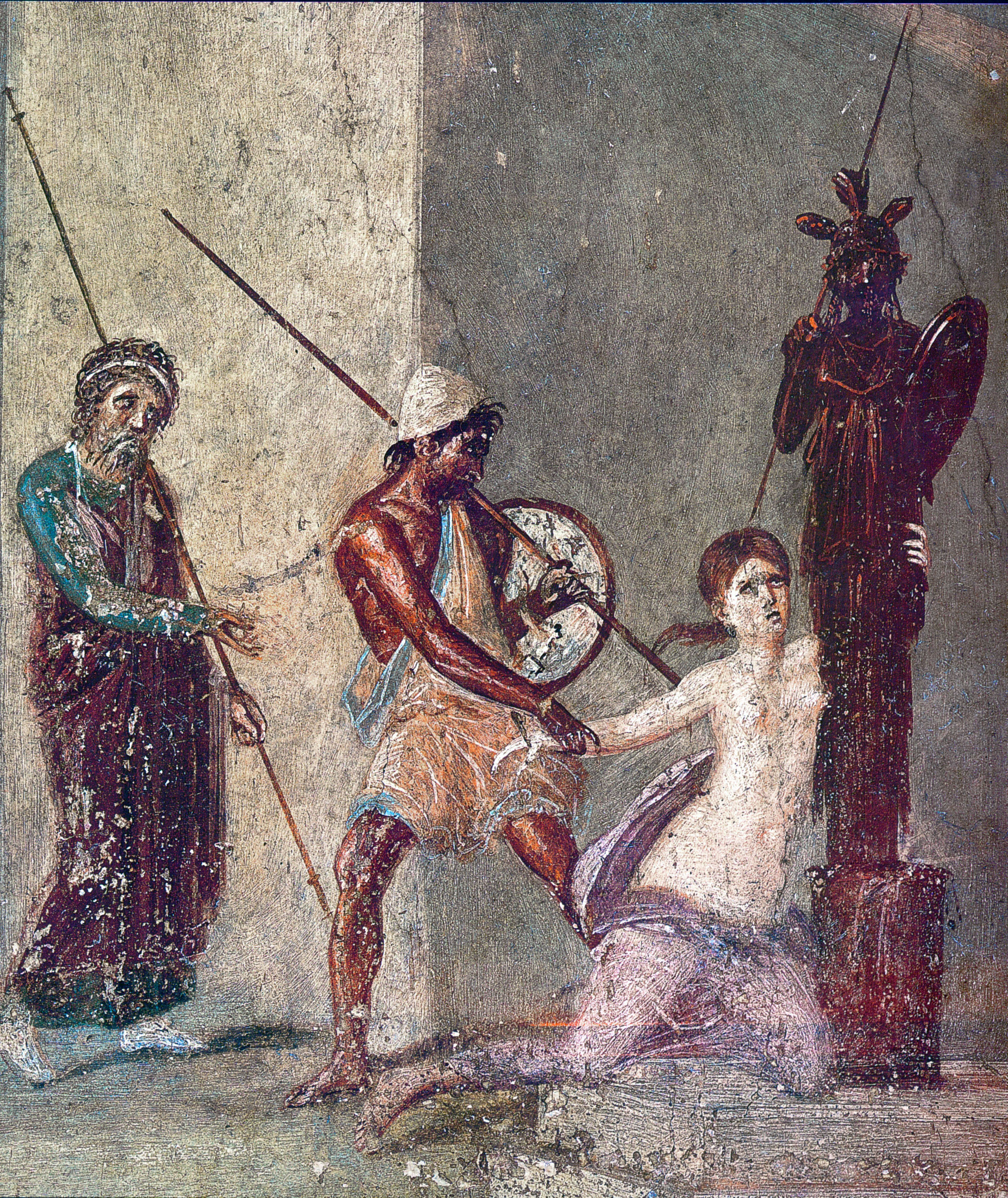
Ajax the Lesser drags Cassandra from the Palladium. Detail from a Roman fresco in the atrium of the Casa del Menandro (I 10, 4) in Pompeii.

=== Origins ===
The Trojan Palladium was said to be a wooden image of Pallas (whom the Greeks identified with Athena and the Romans with Minerva) and to have fallen from heaven in answer to the prayer of Ilus, the founder of Troy.

"The most ancient talismanic effigies of Athena", Ruck and Staples report, "were magical found objects, faceless pillars of Earth in the old manner, before the Goddess was anthropomorphized and given form through the intervention of human intellectual meddling."

=== Arrival at Troy ===
The arrival at Troy of the Palladium, fashioned by Athena in remorse for the death of Pallas, as part of the city's founding myth, was variously referred to by Greeks, from the seventh century BC onwards. The Palladium was linked to the Samothrace mysteries through the pre-Olympian figure of Elektra, mother of Dardanus, progenitor of the Trojan royal line, and of Iasion, founder of the Samothrace mysteries. Whether Elektra had come to Athena's shrine of the Palladium as a pregnant suppliant and a god cast it into the territory of Ilium, because it had been profaned by the hands of a woman who was not a virgin, or whether Elektra carried it herself or whether it was given directly to Dardanus vary in sources and scholia. In Ilion, King Ilus was blinded for touching the image to preserve it from a burning temple.

=== Theft ===
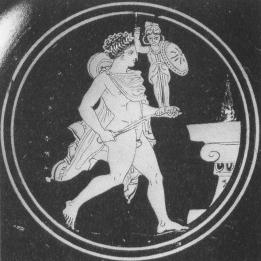
Diomedes with the Palladium approaches an altar

During the Trojan War, the importance of the Palladium to Troy was said to have been revealed to the Greeks by Helenus, the prophetic son of Priam. After Paris' death, Helenus left the city but was captured by Odysseus. The Greeks somehow managed to persuade the warrior seer to reveal the weakness of Troy: the city would not fall while the Palladium remained within its walls. The perilous task of stealing this sacred statue again fell upon the shoulders of Odysseus and Diomedes. The two stole into the citadel in Troy by a secret passage and carried it off, leaving the desecrated city open to the deceit of the Trojan Horse.

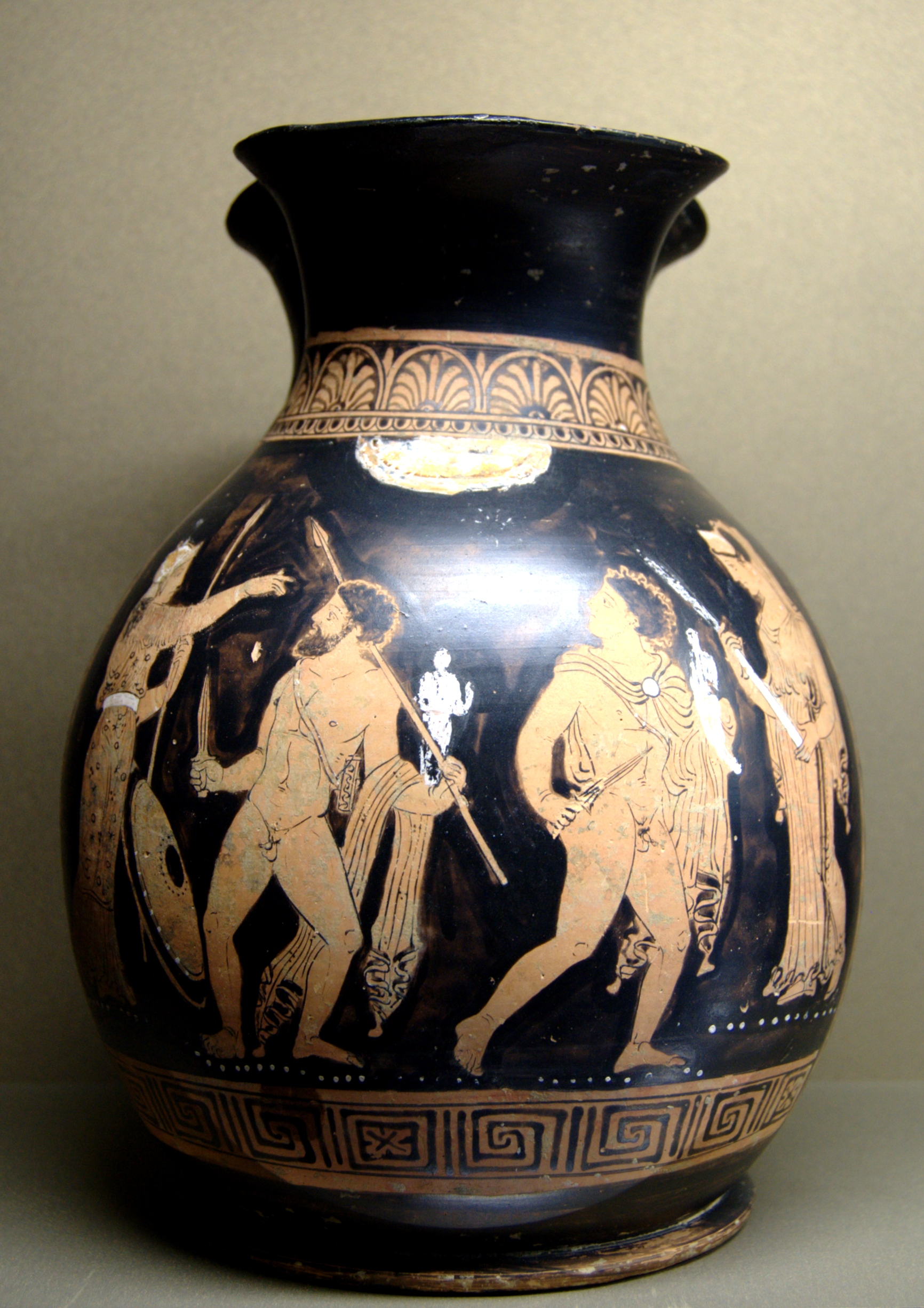
Odysseus and Diomedes steal the Palladium from Troy. (Apulian red-figure oinochoe of c. 360–350 BC from Reggio di Calabria.)

Odysseus, according to the epitome of the Little Iliad (one of the books of the Epic Cycle) preserved in Proclus's Chrestomathia, went by night to Troy disguised as a beggar. There he was recognized by Helen, who told him where to find the Palladium. After some stealthy killing, he went back to the ships. He and Diomedes then re-entered the city and stole the sacred statue. Diomedes is sometimes depicted as the one carrying the Palladium to the ships. There are several statues and many ancient drawings of him with the Palladium.

According to the Narratives of the Augustan period mythographer Conon, while the two heroes were on their way to the ships, Odysseus plotted to kill Diomedes and claim the Palladium (or perhaps the credit for gaining it) for himself after the latter had refused to help him up the wall and taken the Palladium, and upon returning to Odysseus lied that he had not found the real one, which proved to be false when the statue moved. Presumably angered at the betrayal, Odysseus raised his sword to stab Diomedes in the back. Diomedes was alerted to the danger by glimpsing the gleam of the sword in the moonlight. He disarmed Odysseus, tied his hands, and drove him along in front, beating his back with the flat of his sword. From this action was said to have arisen the Greek proverbial expression "Diomedes' necessity", applied to those who act under compulsion. Because Odysseus was essential for the destruction of Troy, Diomedes refrained from injuring him. Diomedes took the Palladium with him when he left Troy. According to some stories, he brought it to Italy; others say that it was stolen from him on the way.

=== Arrival at Rome ===
According to various versions of this legend the Trojan Palladium found its way to Athens, Argos, Sparta (all in Greece) or Rome in Italy. To this last city it was either brought by Aeneas, the exiled Trojan (Diomedes, in this version, having only succeeded in stealing an imitation of the statue) or surrendered by Diomedes himself.

An actual object regarded as the Palladium was undoubtedly kept in the Temple of Vesta in the Roman Forum for several centuries. It was regarded as one of the pignora imperii, sacred tokens or pledges of Roman rule (imperium).

Pliny the Elder said that Lucius Caecilius Metellus had been blinded by fire when he rescued the Palladium from the Temple of Vesta in 241 BC, an episode alluded to in Ovid and Valerius Maximus. When the controversial emperor Elagabalus (reigned 218–222 AD) transferred the most sacred relics of Roman religion from their respective shrines to the Elagabalium, the Palladium was among them.

In Late Antiquity, it was rumored that the Palladium was transferred from Rome to Constantinople by Constantine the Great and buried under the Column of Constantine in his forum. Such a move would have undermined the primacy of Rome, and was naturally seen as a move by Constantine to legitimize his reign and his new capital.

== The Athenian Palladium ==
The goddess Athena was worshipped on the Acropolis of Athens under many names and cults, the most illustrious of which was of the Athena Poliás, "protectress of the city". The cult image of the Poliás was a wooden effigy, often referred to as the "xóanon diipetés" (the "carving that fell from heaven"), made of olive wood and housed in the east-facing wing of the Erechtheum temple in the classical era. Considered not a man-made artefact but of divine provenance, it was the holiest image of the goddess and was accorded the highest respect. It was placed under a bronze likeness of a palm tree and a gold lamp burned in front of it.

The centerpiece of the grand feast of the Panathenaea was the replacement of this statue's woolen peplos (a garment) with a newly woven one. It was also carried to the sea by the priestesses and ceremonially washed once a year, in the feast called the Plynteria ("washings"). Its presence was last mentioned by the Church Father Tertullian who described it derisively as nothing but "a rough stake, a shapeless piece of wood". Earlier descriptions of the statue have not survived.

== See also ==
- Tutelary deity

== General and cited references ==
- Chisholm, Hugh, ed. (1911). "Palladium" . Encyclopædia Britannica. Vol. 20 (11th ed.). Cambridge University Press. p. 636.
- Cameron, Averil (1993). The Later Roman Empire. Harvard University Press. ISBN 9780674511941.
- Kitzinger, Ernst (1954). "The Cult of Images in the Age before Iconoclasm". Dumbarton Oaks Papers. Vol. 8. Dumbarton Oaks, Trustees for Harvard University. pp. 83–150. doi:10.2307/1291064. JSTOR 1291064.
