= Monica Richards =

American poet

Monica Vivienne Richards (born May 24, 1965) is an American singer, songwriter, artist and author. A graduate of the American University with honors in literature and a minor in anthropology, she is considered to be an icon of the goth subculture and has been the frontwoman of numerous bands including Madhouse, Strange Boutique, Faith and the Muse and The Eden House as well as being a solo artist.

== Biography ==
Richards started singing when she was in her teens and was one of the earliest female singers in the harDCore scene. Hate From Ignorance, Madhouse, Strange Boutique and Faith and the Muse are among the bands she has fronted. She performed at the same time as other bands including Bad Brains, Minor Threat, and State of Alert.

Richards works in a number of different media for her visual art. In her early days as an artist she designed punk rock flyers, album covers and local business logos, among other things. Her work now ranges from painting to graphic art.

Richards' first book, a compilation of art, poetry, essays, and re-writings of Welsh-Celtic tales called The Book of Annwyn, was released in early 1998. She is currently working on a graphic novel based on her short stories called 'Anafae'.

Richards celebrated her Welsh ancestry by headlining the 2011 West Coast Eisteddfod: Welsh Festival of Arts.

== Discography ==
=== Studio albums ===
- 2007: InfraWarrior
- 2011: The Strange Familiar (EP)
- 2012: Naiades
- 2013: Kindred
- 2018: Syzygy (EP, with Anthony Jones)
- 2019: Aestuarium (with Anthony Jones)

== See also ==
- Faith and the Muse
- Strange Boutique
- The Eden House
