= List of deathrock bands =

This is a list of notable deathrock bands. Deathrock (or death rock) is a rock music subgenre incorporating horror elements and gothic theatrics.

== List of artists ==
- 45 Grave
- Alien Sex Fiend
- Ausgang
- Black Ice
- Bloody Dead and Sexy
- Burning Image
- Christian Death
- Devil Master
- Grave Pleasures
- Kommunity FK
- The Last Days of Jesus
- Lover of Sin
- Mephisto Walz
- The Phantom Limbs
- Rudimentary Peni
- Samhain
- Sex Gang Children
- Shadow Project
- Son of Sam
- Specimen
- Super Heroines
- Theatre of Ice

== See also ==
- List of gothic rock artists
