= Love... Is Like Dying =

1986 album by Theatre of Ice

Studio album by Theatre of Ice
- Released: 1986
- Genre: Deathrock
- Label: Orphanage Records

Theatre of Ice chronology
The Resurrection (1986)	Love... Is Like Dying (1986)	In The Attic (1987)

Love... Is Like Dying is the sixth album by the American deathrock band, Theatre of Ice and their first for Orphanage Records.

Orphanage Records, an American label with a solid reputation in the Gothic rock and Deathrock music scenes, offered to re-release The Resurrection; but were unable to obtain any of the masters, except for the two live recordings, from Demented Mind Mill Records. So Orphanage Records asked the band to re-record 7 of the songs from the album, one from The Haunting, two from Beyond the Graves of Passion, 5 new originals, and reuse the two live recordings. These 17 "new" songs were released in 1986 as Love... Is Like Dying. Even though John Johnson is credited as playing on the album, he had previously left the group and only appears on the two live recordings.

Love... Is Like Dying was an immediate success for both the band and for their new label. With Songs as diverse as Dreams of Fire and In The Attic, the album greatly increased their fan base and for the first time put them on the radar of college radio stations across the country. This opened the door for the band to tour parts of the country it had never played live to, it was just up to their label to assure them that "nothing bad would happen" if they were to go on an extended tour.

== Musicians ==
- Brent Johnson - Vocals, Guitars, Effects, Drums
- John Johnson - Guitar, Synthesizer, Keyboards, Percussion
- Dale Garrard - Guitars, Vocals, Ice

== Track listing ==
1. Gone With The Worms
2. She Sleeps
3. In The Attic
4. Dark Haired Lady
5. Somewhere Anywhere
6. You Don't Know What You're Doin
7. Funeral Games (live)
8. Under a Cold Blue Moon
9. Livin in Fiction
10. Dark Horizons
11. Dreams of Fire
12. Crawl
13. Golden Girl
14. Hungry For Ruin
15. Creature
16. Santa Claws (live)

== Reviews ==
- OPtion Magazine - The title says it all—gloomy, overdone Halloween music. Moanings through delays, delayed guitars, morbid lyrics, spooky synthesizer, and drum machine. I think it's great, in the same kind of way as a Herschell Gordon Lewis film. I'm not sure how much of the cheesiness is tongue-in-cheek, although I suspect quite a bit of it is, but either way there are some great sounds here, and it's thoroughly enjoyable to listen to. Come Halloween I'm gonna play this out my window, watch the little kids run, and save myself some money on candy. -- Scott Lewis.
