= List of gothic rock artists =

The following is a list of notable artists who have been described as gothic rock or dark rock by reliable sources. "Gothic rock" is a term typically used to describe a musical subgenre of post-punk and alternative rock that formed during the late 1970s. According to both Pitchfork and NME, proto-gothic bands included Siouxsie and the Banshees, Joy Division, Bauhaus and the Cure. The term was first used by critic John Stickney in 1967 to describe the music and accompanying performances by the Doors. The Doors' lyrics and their "audience-antagonizing performances" have even been seen as the beginning of gothic rock.

== 0–9 ==
- 1919
- 45 Grave
- The 69 Eyes

== A ==
- AFI
- Alien Sex Fiend
- All About Eve
- And Also the Trees
- Andi Sexgang
- ASP
- Asylum Party
- Ausgang

== B ==
- Balaam and the Angel
- The Batfish Boys
- Bauhaus
- Big Electric Cat
- The Birthday Party
- The Breath of Life
- Buck-Tick

== C ==
- Cemetery Skyline
- Children on Stun
- Christian Death
- The Church
- City of Caterpillar
- Clan of Xymox
- Closterkeller
- Cocteau Twins
- Corpus Delicti
- Cradle of Thorns
- The Crüxshadows
- The Cult
- The Cure

== D ==
- Damien Done
- The Damned
- The Danse Society
- Dead Can Dance
- Deadsy
- Death in June
- Diva Destruction
- Drab Majesty

== E ==
- The Eden House
- The Eighties Matchbox B-Line Disaster
- Eva O

== F ==
- Faith and the Muse
- Fields of the Nephilim
- Flesh for Lulu

== G ==
- Gene Loves Jezebel
- Ghost Dance
- Gitane Demone
- Grave Pleasures
- Grinderman

== H ==
- HIM

== I ==
- Ikon
- Inkubus Sukkubus

== J ==
- Joy Division

== K ==
- Katatonia
- Killing Joke
- Kommunity FK
- Komu Vnyz

== L ==
- Lacrimosa
- L'Âme Immortelle
- Lapko
- The Last Days of Jesus
- Lebanon Hanover
- London After Midnight
- Lord of the Lost
- The Lords of the New Church
- Lorelei
- Lost Velvet
- Love Like Blood
- Lycia

== M ==
- Madrugada
- Malice Mizer
- Mandragora Scream
- The March Violets
- Marilyn Manson
- Mephisto Walz
- The Merry Thoughts
- Miranda Sex Garden
- The Mission
- Mono Inc.
- Mors Syphilitica

== N ==
- Nic Nassuet
- Nightingale
- Nightmare
- Nosferatu

== O ==
- Orgy

== P ==
- Paradise Lost
- Paralysed Age
- Party Day
- Pink Turns Blue
- Play Dead

== Q ==
- Queenadreena

== R ==
- Razed in Black
- Red Lorry Yellow Lorry
- Rome Burns
- Roselia
- Rosetta Stone

== S ==
- Samhain
- Scarling
- Screams for Tina
- Sex Gang Children
- Shadow Project
- ShamRain
- She Wants Revenge
- Siiiii
- Sinnergod
- Siouxsie and the Banshees
- The Sisters of Mercy
- Skeletal Family
- Sluka (band)
- Soul Merchants
- Southern Death Cult
- Specimen
- Strange Boutique
- Super Heroines
- Switchblade Symphony

== T ==
- Theatre of Hate
- Theatre of Ice
- Theatre of Tragedy
- These New Puritans
- This Mortal Coil
- Tones on Tail
- Trivalia
- Two Witches

== U ==
- UK Decay
- Unto Others
- Untoten
- Urban Tales

== V ==
- The Veils
- Virgin Prunes
- Voltaire

== W ==
- The Wake
- Wolf Parade

== X ==
- Xmal Deutschland

== Y ==
- You Shriek

== Z ==
- Zeraphine

== See also ==
- List of gothic metal bands
- List of deathrock bands
