= The Resurrection (Theatre of Ice album) =

Studio album by Theatre of Ice
- Released: 1986
- Genre: Deathrock
- Label: Demented Mind Mill Records

Theatre of Ice chronology
Mouse Blood (1985)	The Resurrection (1986)	Love... Is Like Dying (1986)

The Resurrection is the fifth album by the American deathrock band, Theatre of Ice.

== Background ==
With Dale Garrard, John and Brent Johnson all playing guitar as well as other instruments the album took on a very dark, heavy, near metal sound; this was not seen initially as a positive direction for the band by their label who wanted them to stick closer to the sound of their previous two albums, which had become the biggest commercial successes Demented Mind Mill Records had. The label soon changed its mind when promotional versions of "Gone With The Worms", and "Tomorrow Never Comes", the first two songs released for the new album, received very favorable responses from radio stations across Europe.

The Resurrection was the first album the band did not attempt to record entirely at some remote “haunted” location. No haunted houses, and with the exception of 2 songs, no cemeteries. It is not completely known chronologically which songs were recorded first – so it is not known whether the events that occurred when recording "She Sleeps" and "Holy Holy Cry" led to the decision to end the "haunted location recording sessions" or not. What is well documented is that the band chose a small unused and seldom cared for cemetery to record these two previously mentioned dark and moody pieces. During the play-back of "Holy Holy Cry" it is reported by all who were present that something could be heard rapidly moving through the grass, weeds, and bushes toward the grave where the band had set up to record. The sound was almost like that of galloping beast, it is said. Suddenly an invisible force burst out of the darkness and fell upon all who were there – and then left just as suddenly. It is widely held that this event led to John Johnson leaving the band upon completion of the album.

Recording completed just before Christmas 1985 and the album was set to be released in early 1986. Despite their commitment to never play live again, at the conclusion of the recording process the band played an impromptu concert in the isolated mountain town of Payson, Arizona. Live versions of the previously released "Funeral Games" and the newly penned "Santa Claws" (written 30 minutes before they took the stage) were included on The Resurrection in an attempt to end the rumors that the band had indeed committed suicide 6 months earlier in the "Mouse Blood Fire", a rumor that had continued to grow despite the announced release of a newly recorded album.

The Resurrection proved, however, to be the death knell for Demented Mind Mill Records. Although another critical success for the band it sold very poorly. It is debatable whether its poor sales led to the closing of the Demented Mind Mill or whether the impending bankruptcy of the Demented Mind Mill led to the albums poor sales. To this date it is unknown how many actual copies were pressed or sold, the album is almost impossible to find and rarely comes up for sale on any of the internet auction sites.

== Musicians ==
- Brent Johnson – Vocals, Guitars, Effects, Drums
- John Johnson – Guitar, Synthesizer, Keyboards, Percussion
- Dale Garrard – Guitars, Vocals, Ice

== Track listing ==
1. Gone With The Worms
2. She Sleeps
3. Somewhere Anywhere
4. Livin in Fiction
5. Beneath the Stones
6. Relentless
7. Dark Haired Lady
8. Of Blood and Ice
9. You Don't Know What You're Doin
10. Funeral Games (live)
11. Tomorrow Never Comes
12. Resurrect
13. ...and the Buzzards Shall Feast
14. In the Coming Years
15. Holy Holy Cry
16. Hungry For Ruin
17. Santa Claws (live)

== Reviews ==
- OPtion Magazine, Los Angeles – The experimental underground meets death rock and the results are, alternately, genuinely menacing, tongue in cheek, eerie, and oddball. The sound quality could be (much) better, but besides that, this is an engaging view of life – looking out from the crypt. –Bob Morris.
- Sporadic Droolings – Shiver me timbers! They're branching out to say the least. "Gone With The Worms" glimpses at a surf or spy theme interplayed with Theatre of Ice's twisted imbalance. "Dark Haired Lady" slides into the scheme of things as a love song – no gloom but plenty of electricity nonetheless. They pull it off alright. "You Don't Know What You're Doin" is about as funky as TOI ever have gotten. Who actually rendered themselves a fountain of disinformation by saying that TOI was a horror experimental band and nothing more? The live cut had me yearning to witness the full experience. Hopefully that won't be the last live performance for the band as was stated in the lyric booklet. The distortion-laden gitz that comprised only a minimal area of the style has now been bolstered, boosting the overall impact. It suits the acidic keyboards and tape manipulations just fine. Theatre of Ice are simply the last word in horror-leaning sounds. Nobody comes near their competence. And innovation is merely one facet of the TOI experience. Try this experience if you haven't already. Disappointment won't exist as far as the listener is concerned.
