= Stevenson Sedgwick =

American songwriter

Stevenson Sedgwick is an American musician, record producer, author, programmer and professional gambler, most known for his compositions as the songwriter for the post-punk, experimental, deathrock group The Phantom Limbs, and as one of the principal songwriters for Black Ice. He is also known for work as producer assistant and mixer for artists including electronic music pioneer Gary Numan.

== Composer for The Phantom Limbs ==
Stevenson Sedgwick was the founder and composer for the post-punk/deathrock band The Phantom Limbs, which gained notoriety in the San Francisco bay area and later internationally (including two world tours) for Stevenon's unique keyboard-driven compositions, and the outrageous stage behavior of their singer, Hopeless (aka Loto Ball). They garnered the attention of Jello Biafra of Dead Kennedys fame to his Alternative Tentacles label, which put out their critically acclaimed debut Applied Ignorance as well as the subsequent Displacement and Accept the Juice albums. Upon their demise, Biafra wrote that he "missed them more than any band in recent history"

== Songwriter for Black Ice ==
Sedgwick, along with Skot B, also a member of The Phantom Limbs, formed Black Ice, a more experimental group that also became notable in the San Francisco Bay area and later internationally.

== Other notable group membership ==
Sedgwick was also a member of San Francisco-based groups The Holy Revolver Society, The Electrocution Boys and the Los Angeles-based Factory of Angst and Bloody Malynda.

== Author ==
Sedgwick has provided commentary to the zines 'I Like Tuesdays', 'Not Peace But a Sword' as well as fiction to 'The Utne Reader', and 'Youth Writes' magazine.

== Professional gambler ==
Sedgwick is a founder of Mungaso.com, a home for his bands and related bands as well as a site for other interests, such as exploits into thoroughbred handicapping skills. The site provides tools free of charge to assess overlays in thoroughbred wagering.

== Co-founder of Polish American History Quarter ==
Sedgwick, along with Sasha Bokor is a founder of "Polish American History Quarter", designated as the first three months of the year, dedicated to Polish-Americans contributions to American.
