= Death music =

Death music may refer to one of several styles of music with the prefix "death-":

- Death metal
- Death rock
- Deathcore
