= The Haunting (Theatre of Ice album) =

Studio album by Theatre of Ice
- Released: 1982
- Recorded: Nevada, 1981
- Genre: Deathrock
- Label: Demented Mind Mill Records

Theatre of Ice chronology
The Haunting (1982)	Beyond the Graves of Passion (1983)

The Haunting is the first full-length album by the American deathrock/gothic rock band Theatre of Ice, recorded in 1981 and released in 1982.

The recording sessions took place in a supposedly haunted house somewhere in the deserts of Nevada. While many at the time thought it nothing more than a gimmick, the band claimed that it inspired them to create what is now considered one of the more deranged albums ever recorded. Rather than opting for one musical style, the album alternates between hard, razor-sharp, creepy-crawly punk rock with echo-like wolf howls to textural synthesizer soundtracks filled with strange noises. But while the musical style varied, the themes remained rooted in modern horror.

== Critical reception ==
- Maximum Rock N' Roll, San Francisco, California – "Unlike anything I've heard before. Whether that is a good thing or a bad thing is yet to be determined. Very weird."
- OPtion Magazine, Los Angeles – "Hard, razor sharp, creepy crawly rock'n'roll with echo-like wolf howls. Rumored to have been recorded in an actual haunted house in the Nevada desert, with khemical/magikal rituals to 'inspire' the musicians and derange their music. 'A Wagonload of Corpses' sounds like time warp travel back to Middle Ages Black Plague Epidemic Rot. These maniacs were born to score horror flicks." – Nik Wax.
- Unsound Magazine, San Francisco, California – "This is the first release from the band which describes their sound as a fusion of Suicide's minimalism, Chrome's psychedelia, Snakefinger's pop and Throbbing Gristle's violent confusion. This album is well produced and moves smoothly within its conceptual nature. Their focus is the morbid, bloody horror of B-monster movies with the campy mystery of blood and guts. Textural synthesizer lines and strange noises create a soundtrack style piece, a great substitute for ghost stories around the campfire."
- Flipside (fanzine), Los Angeles, California – "Moody post punk to experimental droney music. Perhaps the 'scariest' album ever."
- OP, Seattle – "The Haunting by Theatre of Ice features end-of-world vocals over throbbing industrial beats. Abrupt cuts of TV audio, weird hypnotic trumpets (?), synths. Excellent. Unlike anything before it."
- Cause and Effect, Indianapolis, Indiana – "Theatre of Ice are masters of the B-monster movie sound. This is raw primitive punk music whose subject matter deals with the morbid and macabre. Features a savage, echoey guitar sound and vocals straight-from-the-crypt. Recorded in a haunted house in the middle of the Nevada desert, The Haunting is made up of 21 tracks with titles like The Burning Man, Monsters From Beyond, A Wagonload of Corpses, Brain Damage and, From the Ruins of my Mind."
- SPAMM, Sacramento, California – "Extra moody experimental music. Throbbing synth, spastic but melodic guitars and haunting vocals makes this the music to blast out the window this October 31 to scare the trick or treaters away, the Halloween soundtrack of the 80's. Every composition is well above exceptional standards."
- Phoenix New Times, Phoenix, Arizona – "The Haunting is a success in bringing a modern approach to gothic-horror themes. The band seems to have tackled the idea of a futuristic, underground spook show, but even as an alternative offering there are grave (sorry) deficiencies. At its best, The Haunting shows Theatre of Ice as an outfit with a future in soundtracks and/or audio performance art. The album's droning ambiance and scattered electronic background cries at times almost pulls the listeners inside the gloomy atmosphere. At its worst, the album is a Mr. Hyde of monotonous noise that leaves the listener gasping for a quick, clean pop song. It will now be interesting to hear how the group decides to progress–either as underground practitioners of the macabre, or more accessible musicians who can wrap it all up in a song."

== Track listing ==
1. "A Militant Hymn"
2. "Down Arizona Way"
3. "Theatre of Ice"
4. "You Are The Children"
5. "Puppet Love"
6. "The Burning Man"
7. "A Single Bullet"
8. "The Ghost Did A Scarey Walk"
9. "Driven"
10. "Monsters From Beyond"
11. "A Wagonload of Corpses"
12. "Fade To Red"
13. "The Sound"
14. "Creature on the Hill"
15. "On and On"
16. "Comfort"
17. "Brain Damage"
18. "Message From Home"
19. "From the Ruins of My Mind"
20. "Procession"
21. "Golden Girl"

== Musicians ==
- Brent Johnson – vocals, guitars
- John Johnson – vocals, guitar, keyboards
- Mark Johnson – drums
- Eric Johnson – bass guitar
- Lyle Johnson – keyboards
