= Mouse Blood =

Studio album by Theatre of Ice
- Released: 1985
- Genre: Deathrock
- Label: Demented Mind Mill Records

Theatre of Ice chronology
A Cool Dark Place to Die (1984)	Mouse Blood (1985)	The Resurrection (1986)

Mouse Blood was intended to be Theatre of Ice's final offering as brothers Brent and John moved to Utah to attend college at Brigham Young University and brothers Eric and Mark departed on missions for the Church of Jesus Christ of Latter-day Saints in Georgia and Connecticut. Labeled as "A limited edition sampling of the works of Theatre of Ice as chosen by friends who hate the band" it included songs from their first three albums as well as a few new releases. The album, however, was heralded by the music press as one of the most innovative albums of the decade.

== Musicians ==
- Brent Johnson - Vocals, Guitars & Effects
- John Johnson - Guitar, Synthesizer & Keyboards
- Mark Johnson - Drums & Things
- Eric Johnson - Guitar, Continuity

== Track listing ==
1. It's All Over Now
2. Driven
3. Fox
4. Just Let It Go
5. A Cool Dark Place To Die
6. The Burning Man
7. The Last
8. Starlight Drive
9. Watch The Skies
10. Chill Factor
11. In The Burning Church
12. One Two
13. From the Ruins of my Mind
14. Miron
15. Beneath the Stones
16. Life is a Circus
