= Beyond the Graves of Passion =

Studio album by Theatre of Ice
- Released: 1983
- Studio: Demented Mind Mill and "various other locations" between January 4th and May 13th, 1984.
- Genre: Deathrock
- Label: Demented Mind Mill Records
- Producer: Brent G. Johnson

Theatre of Ice chronology
The Haunting (1982)	Beyond the Graves of Passion (1983)	A Cool Dark Place to Die (1984)

Beyond the Graves of Passion is the second album recorded by the Deathrock/Gothic rock band Theatre of Ice. It was recorded in 1982 and 1983 in an actual haunted house, and released on Demented Mind Mill Records in 1983. The album had the effect of polarizing their audience into two camps; those that considered them to be basically a kitschy novelty act and those that thought they were prophets from the underworld and began following the band from show to show. Ultimately the album failed to gain much attention outside of their cult following. Several bizarre altercations between the band and their devotees led to the band formally disbanding in 1983. One of the most famous altercations led to the band being abducted by a group of crazed fans who believed the band could aid them in summoning demons.

== Musicians ==
- Brent Johnson - Vocals, Guitars
- John Johnson - Vocals, Guitar, Synthesizer
- Mark Johnson - Vocals, Drums
- John Baradet - Percussion
- Eric Johnson - Bass Guitar
- Shareen Sorensen - Violin, Keyboards

== Track listing ==
1. "Red Asphalt"
2. "Fox"
3. "Steps Toward Sanity"
4. "The Creature"
5. "It's All For Fun"
6. "The Hour Has Come"
7. "The Classics"
8. "Going Nowhere"
9. "Termination"
10. "But To Love You"
11. "In Our Haunted World"
12. "The Apparition"
13. "Miron"
14. "It Doesn't Matter"
15. "Bizarre Thoughts"
16. "Funeral Games"
17. "It's Time For You"
18. "Moon Dance Daze"
19. "Chill Factor"
20. "A Haunting Melody"
21. "From the Tomb"

== Reviews ==
- OPtion Magazine, Los Angeles - Horror rock recorded in a haunted house somewhere in the Nevada Desert. 21 songs which bubble around with no pauses; voices, guitars, drums and things, violin (essential in ghost music), and keyboards. Cover is a skull with a skeleton hand holding a pistol to the earplace, from a deserted Nevada ghost town. -- Robin James.
- Untune the Sky, Las Vegas, Nevada - This album is chock full of scary stuff! These brothers from the desolate and incredibly boring Fallon, Nevada have produced some pretty demented and diverse music using whatever instruments and line-up that sounded best at the time. They seem driven by an environment that includes a dead animal disposal site, haunted cemeteries, child molesters and serial killers. This album has "festered" on me. I first dismissed it as pseudo intellectual pud-whacking–I now embrace it as one of the best albums of the decade.
- Artitude Magazine, New York City - Recorded in a haunted house located somewhere in the Nevada desert, these songs are both trashy and serious. Concerned mostly with the topics of death and fear in a somewhat overstated manner, this is saved by its sense of humor and by its relative sincerity. The humor comes in the way that the main themes are repeated in each song - hence the sincerity, in the group's single-mindedness. The music itself is somewhat-trashy, grating rock, sometimes sounding strangely normal and sometimes a bit more unconventional.
- Cause and Effect, Indianapolis, Indiana - The newest release by Theatre of Ice further refines their doom-gloom horror-rock sound. More songs about corpses, graveyards, zombies, blood, teen suicide and dead things. 21 new horror rock classics. Scream your head off. Theatre of Ice is the winner of the 1983 Most Obnoxious Band of the Year Award.
- Unsound Magazine, San Francisco, California - One song intersects with the next in this never ending tragedy on ice. 21 songs comprise this haunting album. I think a lot is missed because of the recording quality, although it adds to the macabre nature.
- Wild Planet, Nebraska - B-movie gloom and doom splatter rock! Unlike a lot of groups in this genre, Theatre of Ice don't sound derivative, and their sound is varied, ranging from bleak industrial soundscapes to moody post punk. Sure, there are obvious influences, Siouxsie Sioux, Chrome, Suicide, Throbbing Gristle, Velvet Underground and others. But Theatre of Ice takes these influences and distle them into their own distinctive sound. Beyond the Graves of Passion is simultaneously the scarier and the more accessible of their two albums, the sound has been refined and even includes some haunting (sorry) melodies, even some spacey synth pieces. A must for fans of the macabre!
- SPAMM, Sacramento, California - This album is much more evolved than The Haunting. It seems as though Theatre of Ice now not only know what they want to do, but they can also transform those ideas into music. Music that hints of industrial throb, maniac hardcore, rough edged pop, and just plain weird shit. Once again, as with their prior release, you have to be kinda warped to truly appreciate such assaults to the mind. Great!
- Factsheet Five, Massachusetts - Imagine 4 brothers in Nevada. The Johnson boys are into horror and music. They think fear is God's gift to mankind. So what do they do? They start a band and make some of the scariest music ever. Whether you call this, industrial or horror rock, the point is that these guys do it well, and are more accessible to the average listener than most industrial music. Their albums could be the soundtracks to your worst nightmares, but they're not oppressive–there are lots of lyrics to pick out and lots of short and medium length songs so the albums never get boring. "It only took a second to cut of her head/I watched it as her golden hair turned to red".
