= In the Attic (Theatre of Ice album) =

EP by Theatre of Ice
- Released: 1987
- Recorded: December 31, 1986
- Genre: Deathrock
- Label: Orphanage Records

Theatre of Ice chronology
Love... Is Like Dying (1986)	In the Attic (1987)	The Dead (1987)

During the fall of 1986 the band Theatre of Ice committed to its only extended tour of the United States. To accommodate the tour, three new members were added to the band; Jay Planty on guitar, Ted Preiss on bass, and Jason Cobb on drums.

For the most part the tour was uneventful, playing mostly as a supporting act, the group performed before crowds that were largely unfamiliar with their history. On New Year's Eve, 1986, the tour concluded in Fallon, Nevada, the birthplace of the band, with a performance in what had long been alleged to be a haunted slaughterhouse. A large concrete edifice, the abandoned slaughterhouse had been the site of many strange sightings and the subject of local ghost stories for over 20 years. More of a video shoot and recording session than an actual concert, it was made open to the public and several hundred of the locals braved the spirits and the cold to attend the show. With their now stripped down, punkier sound, the band tore through several versions of In the Attic, Miron, Gone With the Worms, A Cool Dark Place to Die, Red Asphalt and Within the Ruins of a Mind.

The concert was intended to conclude at the stroke of midnight, ushering in the New Year. But sometime slightly after 11:00pm a bizarre event occurred; all the power suddenly turned off and the slaughterhouse was thrown into total blackness. A few seconds later an unearthly moan howled forth from every speaker and amplifier. Another worldly wail that lasted nearly 30 seconds. Stunned and terrified, the majority of the crowd hastily dispersed and the concert came to a screeching halt. To this date it is still a matter of speculation as to whether this was an actual supernatural occurrence or was staged by the band in an attempt to add to their mystic and legend. What is known is that Jay Planty, Ted Preiss, and Jason Cobb left the band after the event. Planty and Preiss would return several years later, but this was the last time the band recorded at any alleged haunted sites or cemeteries.

Three of the Songs from the session were chosen to be released as the band's first 7-inch ep, In the Attic. Along with the title track the record included Gone with the Worms and Within the Ruins of a Mind. The record was a howling success and was the first in what would be a long string of 7 inch eps the band would release.

== Musicians ==
- Brent Johnson - Vocals
- Dale Garrard - Guitar
- Jay Planty - Guitar
- Ted Preiss - Bass
- Jason Cobb - Drums

== Track listing ==
1. "In The Attic" (Brent Johnson, Dale Garrard) – 3:42
2. "Gone With The Worms" (Brent Johnson, Dale Garrard) – 3:30
3. "Within The Ruins Of A Mind" (Jay Planty, Brent Johnson, Ted Preiss) – 7:12

== Reviews ==
- OPtion Magazine - First 7" vinyl release from this band who've previously released several albums. Musically and lyrically this outfit continues to offer dark, atmospheric, yet slashing horror rock. While this genre has become pretty formulaic, Theatre of Ice nevertheless demonstrate a distinctive sound. though they're hurt here by average production, which fails to bring out the vocals and instrumentation as clearly as it should. -- Steve Kiviat.
- Maximum Rock N' Roll, San Francisco, California - Very weird and funny production for a band that depends on ambience. Three songs, all in the spooky/cold vein. Bleak tunes, atmospheric guitar, and echoey vocals. -- TY.
- Flipside (fanzine), Los Angeles, California - Hidden beneath the layers of distortion are some catchy, spooky and funny songs. Bauhaus fans might to take note. -- Kirk.
- Burning Toddlers - Raw, gloomy rock that drags the listener along the razor's edge of insanity and despair. When TOI is at its best, it strikes a chord - then proceeds to rip that chord out full force.
- Spinal Jauntice - The ever mysterious TOI supposedly began more or less as "hard rock", now abandoning that realm for more experimental outings. "In the Attic" I suppose falls in between as the two merge, making the closest thing I've heard to an auditory hallucination. The two songs on side one are evil, in fact, but the voice just doesn't seem to click in well. That would have been enough for the makings of an average, visions-of-rapidly-splattering-bodies record. Then comes the epic 7-minute "Within the Ruins of a Mind", that totally grinds, with a shuddering, metallic sound that doesn't let up until it's over. A deathly 7".
