= A Cool Dark Place to Die =

Studio album by Theatre of Ice
- Released: 1984
- Genre: Deathrock
- Label: Demented Mind Mill

Theatre of Ice chronology
Beyond the Graves of Passion (1983)	A Cool Dark Place to Die (1984)	Mouse Blood (1985)

A Cool Dark Place to Die is an album by Theatre of Ice, released in 1984.

Initially conceived as a solo project for lead vocalist Brent Johnson, it instead became the band's third album and one of their most critically acclaimed works. Since the band would only reform on the condition that they were never asked to perform live again, a commitment they were never able to keep, the songs took on a far more experimental and unearthly quality. Featuring an effective spooky ambiance, they all but totally abandoned their punk rock roots for a far more electronic sound. This time the band chose to record in various ghost town cemeteries located throughout the Nevada desert. Perhaps more mood than music, it was still reviewed by almost every music magazine as death rock and acclaimed as being unlike anything heard before.

== Track listing ==
Source: Discogs

1. Welcome to My World
2. "A Cool Dark Place to Die"
3. "Radio Has Gone Insane"
4. "Deliverance"
5. "Love"
6. "Twilight Messiah"
7. "Witchcraft"
8. "Circle of Stars"
9. "The Calling"
10. "Rejoice"
11. Life is a Circus
12. "Oblivion"
13. "It's All Over Now"
14. "Riding the Nightmare"
15. "Candlemas"
16. "The Murdering Mind"
17. "One Two"
18. "Overcoming Peace of Mind"
19. "The Horror That Comes in the Night"
20. "Death... and Beyond"
21. "The Last"

== Musicians ==
- Brent Johnson – vocals, guitars and effects
- John Johnson – guitar, synthesizer and keyboards
- Mark Johnson – drums and things
- Eric Johnson – invisibility
