= In the Attic =

In the Attic may refer to:

- In the Attic (Theatre of Ice album)
- In the Attic (webcast), a live weekly webcast
- R.E.M.: In the Attic – Alternative Recordings 1985–1989, an album by R.E.M.
- In the Attic (film), a 2009 animated fantasy film
