= Nic =

Nic is a given name, almost always masculine, often short for Nicholas, Nicolas or variations thereof. It is also a component of Irish-language female surnames. It may refer to:

== Arts and entertainment ==
- Nic Dalton (born 1964), Australian musician
- Nic Endo (born 1976), Japanese-German-American noise musician
- Nic Fiddian-Green (born 1963), British sculptor
- Nic Gotham (1959–2013), Canadian jazz musician
- Nic Harcourt (born 1957), English-American radio and TV presenter
- Nic Hill (born 1981), American film director
- Nic Jones (born 1947), English folk musician
- Nic Nac (born 1989), American record producer and rapper
- Nic Nassuet, American musician
- Nic Pizzolatto (born 1975), American writer and producer
- Nic Potter (1951–2013), British musician and painter
- Nic Romm (born 1974), German actor
- Nic Sadler (born 1965), British cinematographer
- Nic Schiøll (1901–1984), Norwegian sculptor
- Nic Schröder (born 1980), Swedish actor and singer
- Nic Testoni (born 1972), Australian actor and presenter
- Nic Westaway (born 1989), Australian actor and singer

== Politics ==
- Nic Curry (fl. 2016–2019), Canadian politician
- Nic Dakin (born 1955), British politician
- Nic Kipke (born 1979), American politician
- Nic Leblanc (born 1941), Canadian politician
- Nic Lott (born 1979), American politician
- Nic Street (born 1979), Australian politician

== Sports ==
=== Australian rules football ===
- Nic Fosdike (born 1980), Australian rules football player
- Nic Naitanui (born 1990), Australian rules football player
- Nic Newman (born 1993), Australian rules football player

=== Basketball ===
- Nic Belasco (born 1973), Filipino-American basketball player
- Nic Moore (born 1992), American basketball player
- Nic Wise (born 1987), American basketball player

=== Gridiron football ===
- Nic Anderson (born 2004), American football player
- Nic Grigsby (born 1988), American-born Canadian football player
- Nic Demski (born 1993), Canadian football player
- Nic Harris (born 1986), American football player
- Nic Jacobs (born 1991), American football player
- Nic Jones (American football) (born 2001), American football player
- Nic Scourton (born 2004), American football player

=== Rugby union ===
- Nic Berry (born 1984), Australian rugby union player and referee
- Nic Cudd (born 1988), Welsh rugby union player
- Nic Fitisemanu (born 1978), New Zealand rugby union player
- Nic Groom (born 1990), South African rugby union player
- Nic Henderson (born 1981), Australian rugby union player
- Nic Johnson (born 1983), American rugby union player
- Nic Mayhew (born 1988), New Zealand rugby union player
- Nic Reynolds (born 1989), Welsh rugby union player
- Nic Rouse (born 1981), English rugby union player
- Nic Sestaret (born 1982), French rugby union player
- Nic Stirzaker (born 1991), Australian rugby union player
- Nic White (born 1990), Australian rugby union player

=== Other sports ===
- Nic Beveridge (born 1987), Australian paratriathlete
- Nic Fink (born 1993), American swimmer
- Nic Grindrod (born 1975), English racing driver
- Nic Kerdiles (1994–2023), American ice hockey player
- Nic Lentz (born 1989), American baseball umpire
- Nic Maddinson (born 1991), Australian cricketer
- Nic O'Brien (born 1980), New Zealand hurdler
- Nic Pothas (born 1973), South African cricketer
- Nic Rausch (1900–1977), Luxembourgian cyclist in the 1924 Olympics
- Nic Roeser (1896–1997), Luxembourgian gymnast in the 1928 Olympics
- Nic Roldan (born 1982), American polo player and model
- Nic Stene (1921–2006), Norwegian speed skater in the 1952 Olympics
- Nic Strange (born 1987), Welsh badminton player
- Nic Taylor (born 1991), English-Montserratian footballer
- Nic Woods (born 1995), New Zealand field hockey player
- Nic Youngblud (born 1981), Canadian water polo player

== Other fields ==
- Nic Knudtzon (1922–2013), Norwegian telecommunications engineer
- Nic Parry, Welsh TV presenter
- Nic Robertson (born 1962), British CNN correspondent
- Nic Radford (born 1977), American engineer
- Nic Szeremeta (born 1943), English poker player
- Nic Waal (1905–1960), Norwegian psychiatrist

== See also ==
- Nick (disambiguation)
