= To Die For (Integrity album) =

Studio album by Integrity
- Released: September 23, 2003
- Genre: Metalcore
- Length: 22:46
- Label: Deathwish (DWI25)
- Producer: Ben Schigel

Integrity chronology
Closure (2001)	To Die For (2003)	The Blackest Curse (2010)

Professional ratings
Review scores
Source	Rating
AllMusic	4/5 stars
Punknews.org	4/5 stars

To Die For is a studio album by the metalcore band Integrity. The album was released on September 23, 2003 through Deathwish Inc.—a label that was founded by Jacob Bannon of Converge who also designed the album's cover art. To Die For was seen as Integrity's "comeback album" as it was the band's first release of new material after having recently reformed.

== Track listing ==
No.	Title	Length
1.	"Taste My Sin"	2:54
2.	"Dreams Bleed On"	3:47
3.	"Blessed Majesty"	0:52
4.	"Heavens Final War"	2:41
5.	"Nothing Left"	2:13
6.	"Hated of the World"	4:17
7.	"Lost Without You"	1:19
8.	"Burn It Down"	2:59
9.	"To Die For"	1:44

== Personnel ==
Integrity

- Dwid Hellion – vocals
- Blaze Tishko – guitar, vocals
- Michael Jochum – guitar
- Steve Rauckhorst – bass
- Tony "Chubby Fresh" Pines – drums
- John Comprix – guitar

Production

- Ben Schiegel – Production and recording

Artwork and design

- Jacob Bannon – Design, illustration
- Dwid Hellion – Extra artwork on Backbite Records reissue
