= Howling, For the Nightmare Shall Consume =

Howling, for the Nightmare Shall Consume

Studio album by Integrity
- Released: July 14, 2017
- Recorded: September 2016–February 2017
- Studio: Developing Nations Studios
- Genre: Metalcore
- Length: 57:32
- Label: Relapse
- Producer: Kevin Bernsten

Integrity chronology
Suicide Black Snake (2013)	Howling, for the Nightmare Shall Consume (2017)

Professional ratings
Aggregate scores
Source	Rating
Metacritic	82/100
Review scores
Source	Rating
Exclaim!	9/10
Pitchfork	7.7/10

Howling, for the Nightmare Shall Consume is the tenth studio album by American hardcore punk band Integrity. It was released in July 2017 under Relapse Records.

== Track listing ==
No.	Title	Length
1.	"Fallen to Destroy"	1:20
2.	"Blood Sermon"	2:55
3.	"Hymn for the Children of the Black Frame"	2:16
4.	"I Am the Spell"	2:55
5.	"Die With Your Boots On"	2:58
6.	"Serpent of the Crossroads"	6:40
7.	"Unholy Salvation of Sabbaticai Zevi"	7:24
8.	"7 Reece Mews"	6:56
9.	"Burning Beneath the Devils Cross"	3:03
10.	"String Up My Teeth"	4:18
11.	"Howling, for the Nightmare Shall Consume"	6:45
12.	"Viselle de Drac"	5:00
13.	"Entartete Kunst"	1:03
14.	"Deathly Fighter"	3:59

== Personnel ==
Personnel per booklet:

Integrity

- Dwid Hellion – vocals, design
- Domenic Romeo – lead guitar, rhythm guitar, lap steel guitar, sitar, bass, organ, noise

Production

- Kevin Bernsten – recording, sound engineer
- Integrity – production
- Brad Boatright – mastering
- Jimmy Hubbard – photography
- Dwid Hellion – artwork

Additional musicians

- Joshy Brettell – drums, percussion
- Greta Thomas – violin (tracks 7, 12)
- Tony Hare – guitars (track 5)
- Deacon Douglas Williams – backing vocals (track 10)
- Monique Harcum – backing vocals(track 10)
- Le Mabuse Kaiser – backing vocals (track 13)
- Damien Romeo – composer, backing vocals (track 12)
- Evelyn Romeo – backing vocals (track 12)
- Reagan Romeo – backing vocals (track 12)
- Lenore McLimans – backing vocals (track 12)
- Lucian Jack McLimans – backing vocals (track 12)
- Roxanne Lichtenstein – backing vocals (track 12)
