= The Blackest Curse =

Studio album by Integrity
- Released: June 8, 2010
- Genre: Metalcore
- Length: 37:15
- Label: Deathwish Inc. (DWI76)

Integrity chronology
To Die For (2003)	The Blackest Curse (2010)	Thee DestroyORR (2011)

Professional ratings
Review scores
Source	Rating
NME	9/10
Metal Hammer	6/7

The Blackest Curse is a studio album by American hardcore punk band Integrity. it was released on June 8, 2010, through Deathwish Inc. The Blackest Curse is a concept album based on a book written by frontman Dwid.

== Track listing ==
No.	Title	Length
1.	"Process of Illumination"	3:01
2.	"Through the Shadows of Forever"	3:03
3.	"Simulacra"	2:32
4.	"Learn to Love the Lie"	3:46
5.	"Secret Schadenfreude"	3:02
6.	"Before the World Was Young"	8:03
7.	"The Last Great Seance"	3:37
8.	"Spiderwoven"	2:19
9.	"Invocation of the Eternally Coiling Serpent"	6:08
10.	"Take Hold of Forever"	1:44

== Personnel ==
Integrity

- Dwid Hellion – Vocals
- Michael Jochum – Guitar
- Steve Rauckhorst – Bass, guitar
- Nate Jochum – Drums
- Matt Brewer – Guitar

Guest Musicians

- Tom Shaffner – Additional guitar on "Simulacra" and "Before The World Was Young"
- Boyd Rice – Additional vocals on "Learning To Love The Lie"
- Thorsten A. Wilhelm – Additional vocals on "Learning To Love The Lie"
- Nick Fiction – Additional vocals on "Secret Schadenfreude"
- Jack Abernathy – Additional vocals on "Invocation of the Eternally Coiling Serpent"
- Mike Cheese – Vocals and electronics on "Take Hold of Forever"

Production

- Tom Shaffner – Production, engineering and mixing
- Kris Belaen – Engineering
- Vincent Tetaert – Engineering
- Devin Ocampo – Mastering

Artwork and design

- Samuel Nicholas Horn – Photography
- Dwid Hellion – Illustration, photography
