= Integrity (band) =

American hardcore punk band

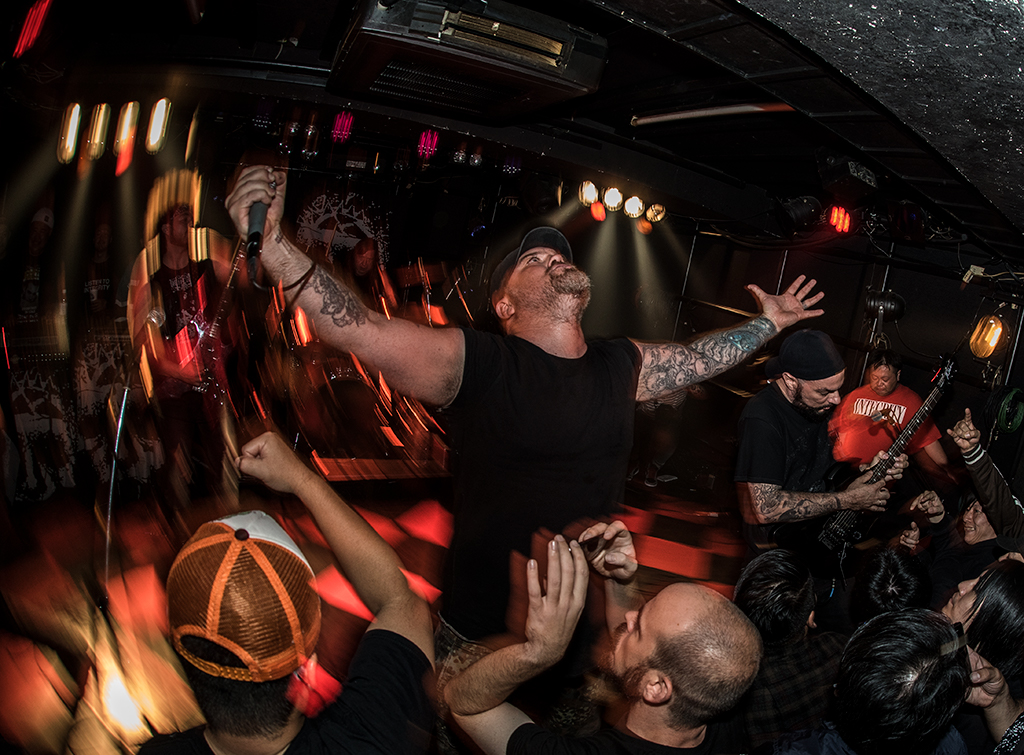
- Integrity in 2017

Background information
- Also known as: Integ2000 (1999–2000)
- Origin: Cleveland, Ohio, U.S.
- Genres: Metalcore; hardcore punk
- Years active: 1988–present
- Labels: Relapse; A389; Deathwish; Holy Terror; Victory; Magic Bullet; Organized Crime
- Members: Dwid Hellion; Alex "The Beast" Henderson; Francis "Darkest Prince" Kano; Justin "Sexminn" Ethem; Asa Dunn; Harley McCoy
- Website: holyterror.com

Integrity is an American hardcore punk band formed in Cleveland, Ohio in 1988, but based in Belgium since 2003. A pioneer of the metalcore genre, the band's merger of influences from hardcore punk and heavy metal music, as well as gothic rock, industrial, noise, doomsday cults and western esotericism, was widely influential on the subsequent development of hardcore and metal. The band was a defining part of the 1990s hardcore scene, influencing similarly influential bands such as Converge, Hatebreed and Killswitch Engage.

During the 1980s, Dwid Hellion had enjoyed creating "fake bands", whom he would devise backstories and print merchandise for, spreading stories of these bands through word of mouth and calling in to radio shows. One of these fake bands was a supposedly twisted and violent straight edge band named Integrity. Following the disbandment of Hellion's legitimate straight edge youth crew band Die Hard, he morphed this vision into a real band, forming Integrity in 1988 with guitarist Aaron Melnick, who was also in Die Hard, as well as drummer Tony "Chubby Fresh" Pines and bassist Tom Front. The band's classic lineup consisted of Hellion and brothers Aaron and Leon Melnick, who were accompanied by various drummers during this time, releasing the band's first four studio albums. In 1999, Hellion recruited brothers Dave and Steve Felton of Mushroomhead, as well as bassist Craig Martini, renaming the group Integ2000. By 2001, the band had returned to simply Integrity, releasing an additional five studio albums.

== History ==
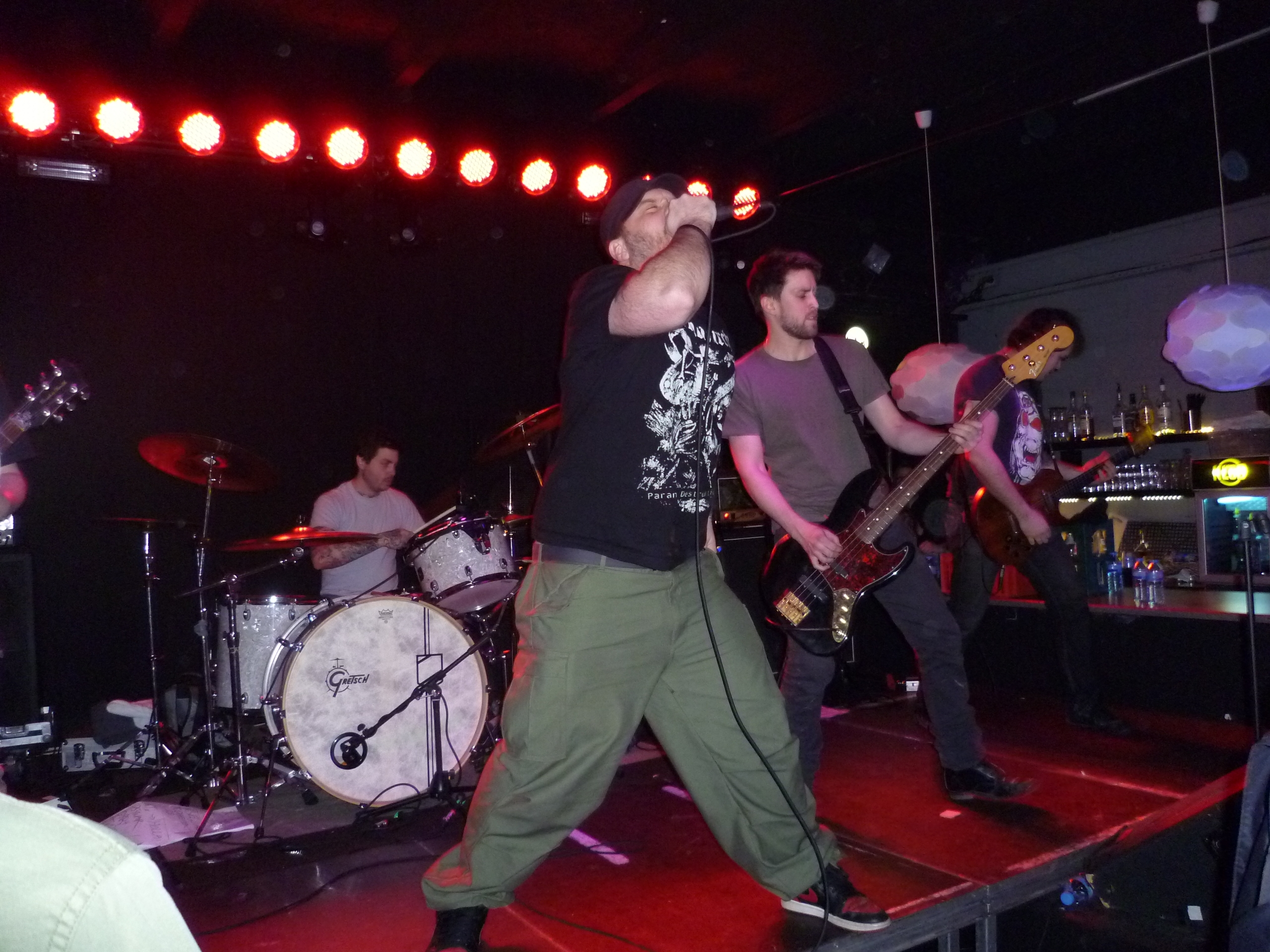
Integrity performing live in 2012

While in his teens, Dwid Hellion would often create fake band logos and backstories, and then print and sell merchandise for them. One such band was "Integrity", whose logo he created from a scan of a cover of a book of the same name he had found in a second hand shop. The story he envisioned for this band was that they were the darkest and most violent straight edge band, who would assault concertgoers who were drinking.

In the following years, Hellion met Aaron Melnick while both working as road crew, and they shared over their similarly broad musical taste. Together they formed the band Die Hard. Following the disbandment of Die Hard, Hellion and Melnick formed Integrity along with drummer Tony "Chubby Fresh" Pines and bassist Tom Front, making use of the concepts and artwork Hellion had designed years prior. The band released their first demo tape Harder They Fall in 1989. Following the departure of Front, Melnick's brother Leon, who was only in middle school at the time, took over the role as the band's bassist. Soon, they hired second guitar Chris Smith, who was in the band False Hope.

The band released their debut album Those Who Fear Tomorrow in 1991. Its fusion of metal and hardcore led to Integrity becoming one of the earliest cornerstones of the metalcore genre. The album was universally panned by critics, many saying it would "ruin hardcore". Despite this, the album was largely influential in the hardcore scene, pushing many groups to incorporate darker elements and metal influences. Following the album's release, recruited drummer Mark Konopka who was previously a member of Outface. Their second album They hired guitar Chris Smith, who was in the band False Hope, and Mark Konopka who was previously a member of Outface.Systems Overload was released in 1995, by which time metalcore was beginning to become the most prominent style in the hardcore scene. Their third album Humanity is the Devil was released in 1996, followed by Seasons In The Size Of Days in 1997.

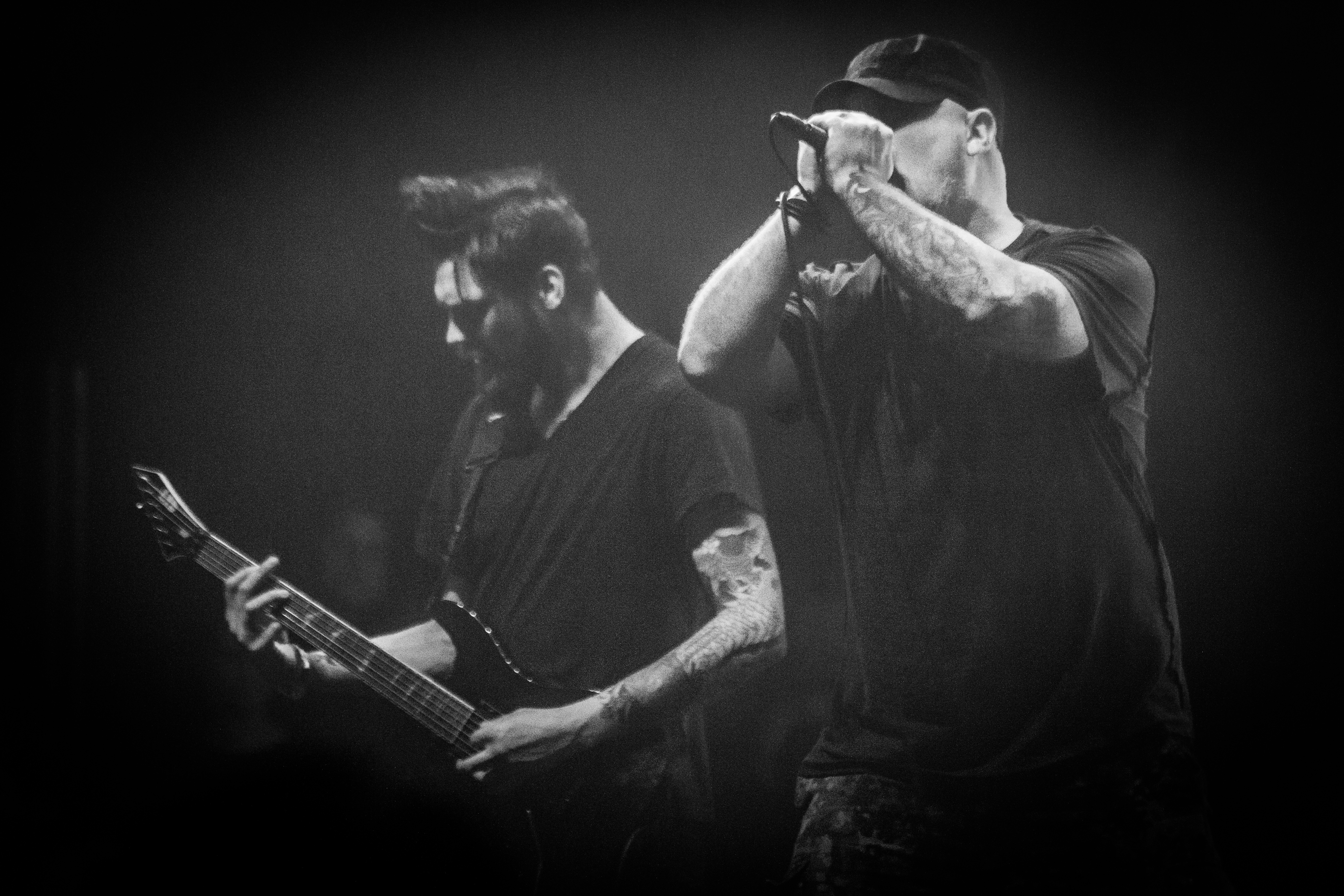
Integrity in 2017

In 1999, the Melnick brothers departed from the group, leading to Hellion hiring Dave and Steve Felton of Mushroomhead, as well as bassist Craig Martini. This lineup changed its name to Integ2000. Following the departure of the Felton brothers, the band's name returned to simply "Integrity". This lineup released the band's fifth album Integrity 2000 in 1999. Their sixth album Closure was released in 2001.

Their seventh studio album To Die For (2003) was advertised as their "comeback" album, seeing the return of the band's founding drummer Tony Pines. The same year, the band relocated to Belgium.

Their eighth studio album The Blackest Curse was released in 2010. In early 2012, the band played at the A389 Bash music festival, an annual event organized by Pulling Teeth guitarist Domenic Romeo. Their ninth studio album Suicide Black Snake was released in 2013. That same year, the band began recording with its Systems Overload era lineup: Hellion, Aaron and Leon Melnick, Chris Smith and Mark Konopka. This culminated in the 7th Revelation: Beyond The Realm Of The VVitch EP, which was first sold on January 18, 2014, the A389 X Bash concert, where the lineup performed. The EP was then officially released on February 7, 2014 by A389 Recordings. Their tenth studio album Howling, For the Nightmare Shall Consume was released in 2017.

== Musical style and legacy ==
Integrity's music combines elements of disparate genres, including hardcore punk, industrial, techno, noise, gothic rock, blues, jazz, thrash metal, doom metal, classic rock, 1950s pop music and Americana. Decibel write Michael Wohlberg called them "apocalyptic hardcore" while Vice Media writer Andy Capper called them "thrillingly nihilistic, gothic hardcore". Invisible Oranges writer Neill Jameson called Closure (2001) "Southern Gothic".

Integrity have cited musical influences including G.I.S.M., Raw Power, Max and Igor Cavalera of Sepultura and Cavalera Conspiracy, Amebix, Slayer, Judge, Cro-Mags, Straight Ahead, Gorilla Biscuits, Underdog, Suicidal Tendencies, Negative Approach, Project X, Side by Side, Whitehouse, Danzig, Randy Uchida Group, Sex Messiah, G.A.T.E.S., Zouo, LSD, Arkha Sva, Kriegshog, AVM, Zyanose, Rapes, Alan Lomax, Howlin' Wolf, Celtic Frost, Septic Death, Black Sabbath, Samhain, Metallica, Joy Division, Bauhaus and Throbbing Gristle. Additionally, they have cited non-musical influences including Arthur Rimbaud, Charles Manson, the Bible, Francis Bacon, Tristan Tzara and André Breton.

=== Lyrical themes ===
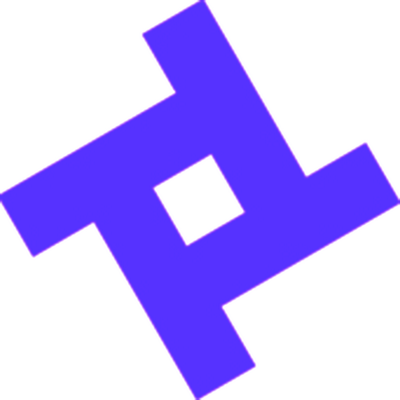
The logo for the Process Church of the Final Judgement, a recurring symbol in Integrity's imagery, and the logo for their record label Holy Terror Records

Integrity's lyrics often discuss religions and the occult. Criminal and cult leader Charles Manson is a common topic of the band's lyrics, whom Hellion described as "both a political prisoner and religious martyr. A messenger and a bard." Hellion maintained a personal relationship with Manson, releasing a number of recordings the cult leader had made in prison, Manson even endorsing Integrity's album Humanity is the Devil (1996). Additionally, the Process Church of the Final Judgement is also often discussed. It has even been suggested by Noisecreep that Hellion, under the pseudonym Jack Abernathy, founded the Process Church splinter group the Holy Terror Church of Final Judgment. The band often write concept albums, exploring a single story across an album's wrong run-time, with Humanity is the Devil being based on the beliefs of the Process Church. Furthermore, Howling, For the Nightmare Shall Consume (2017) telling a story of Francis Bacon's involvement in a séance leading to him being lead through a number of esoteric events and gaining the ability to see the demons with humans.

=== Legacy ===
Integrity was a pioneer of the metalcore genre. Those Who Fear Tomorrow (1991) merged hardcore with apocalyptic lyrics and metal's guitar solos and chugging riffs to create one of the primeval albums in the genre. The term "holy terror" refers to the specific style of metalcore that Integrity helped to pioneer, which is typified by soaring guitar leads, gravelly vocals and lyrics discussing western esotericism. Revolver magazine writer Elis Enis stated that the album "influenced practically every breakdown that's been recorded since". Philip Trapp of Loudwire stated that Integrity "charted the course for metalcore to come", citing Dwid Hellion as one of the genre's most iconic vocalists.

In the 2013 Decibel "Hall of Fame", Integrity's Systems Overload (1995) was referred to as "the landmark work in a grand and heretical oeuvre". In 2020, John Hill of Loudwire included the band's debut album in his list of the "Top 25 Metalcore Albums of All Time."

Integrity have been cited as an influence by bands including All Pigs Must Die, Clear, Converge, Full of Hell, Hatebreed, Killswitch Engage, Overcast, Pulling Teeth, Ringworm, Rise and Fall and Unbroken.

== Members ==
=== Current members ===
- Dwid Hellion – vocals, programming, keyboards (1988–present)
- Francis "Darkest Prince" Kano – bass (2017–present)
- Justin "Sexman" Ethem – guitar (2018–present)
- Asa Dunn – guitar (2024–present)
- Harley McCoy – guitar (2025-present)
- Camille Gaudou - drums (2021-present)

=== Former members ===
- Aaron Melnick – guitar, vocals (1988–1998, 2013–2014)
- Tom Front – bass (1988–1989)
- Tony "Chubby Fresh" Pines – drums (1988–1991, 2002–2003)
- Frank Cavanaugh – guitar (1991)
- Bill Mckinney – guitar (1991)
- Chris Smith II – guitar (1991–1996, 2013–2014)
- Mark Konopka – drums (1994–1996, 2013–2014)
- Frank "3 Gun" Novineck – guitar (1995–1998)
- Dave "Gravy" Felton – guitar (1998–2000)
- Vee Price – guitar, bass, vocals (2000–2002)
- John Comprix – guitar (2003)
- Blaze Tishko – guitar, vocals (2003)
- Mike Jochum – guitar (2003–2009)
- Matt Brewer – guitar (2005–2006)
- Rob Orr – guitar, bass, drums (2006–2013)
- Domenic Romeo – guitar, bass, organ (2014–2023)
- Leon Micha Melnick – bass (1989–1998, 2013–2014)
- Craig Martini – bass (1998–2000)
- Steve Rauckhorst – bass (2003–2010)
- David Nicholi Araca – drums (1991–1994)
- Chris Dora – drums (1996–1998)
- Steve Felton – drums (1998–2000)
- Nate Jochum – drums (2005–2009)

== Discography ==
=== Studio albums ===
- Those Who Fear Tomorrow (1991), Overkill
- Systems Overload (1995), Victory
- Humanity Is the Devil (1996), Victory
- Seasons in the Size of Days (1997), Victory
- Integrity 2000 (1999), Victory
- Closure (2001), Victory
- To Die For (2003), Deathwish
- The Blackest Curse (2010), Deathwish
- Suicide Black Snake (2013), A389/Magic Bullet
- Howling, For the Nightmare Shall Consume (2017), Relapse

=== EPs ===
- Den of Iniquity (1993)
- Hooked, Lung, Stolen Breath Cunt (1994)
- Final Taste of Every Sin (1999)
- In Contrast of Tomorrow (2001, 2006)
- 7th Revelation: Beyond the Realm of the VVitch (2013)

=== Other releases ===
- Harder They Fall (demo) (1989)
- Palm Sunday (live) (2006), Aurora Borealis
- All Death Is Mine: Total Domination (compilation) (2024), Relapse
