= Horror film score =

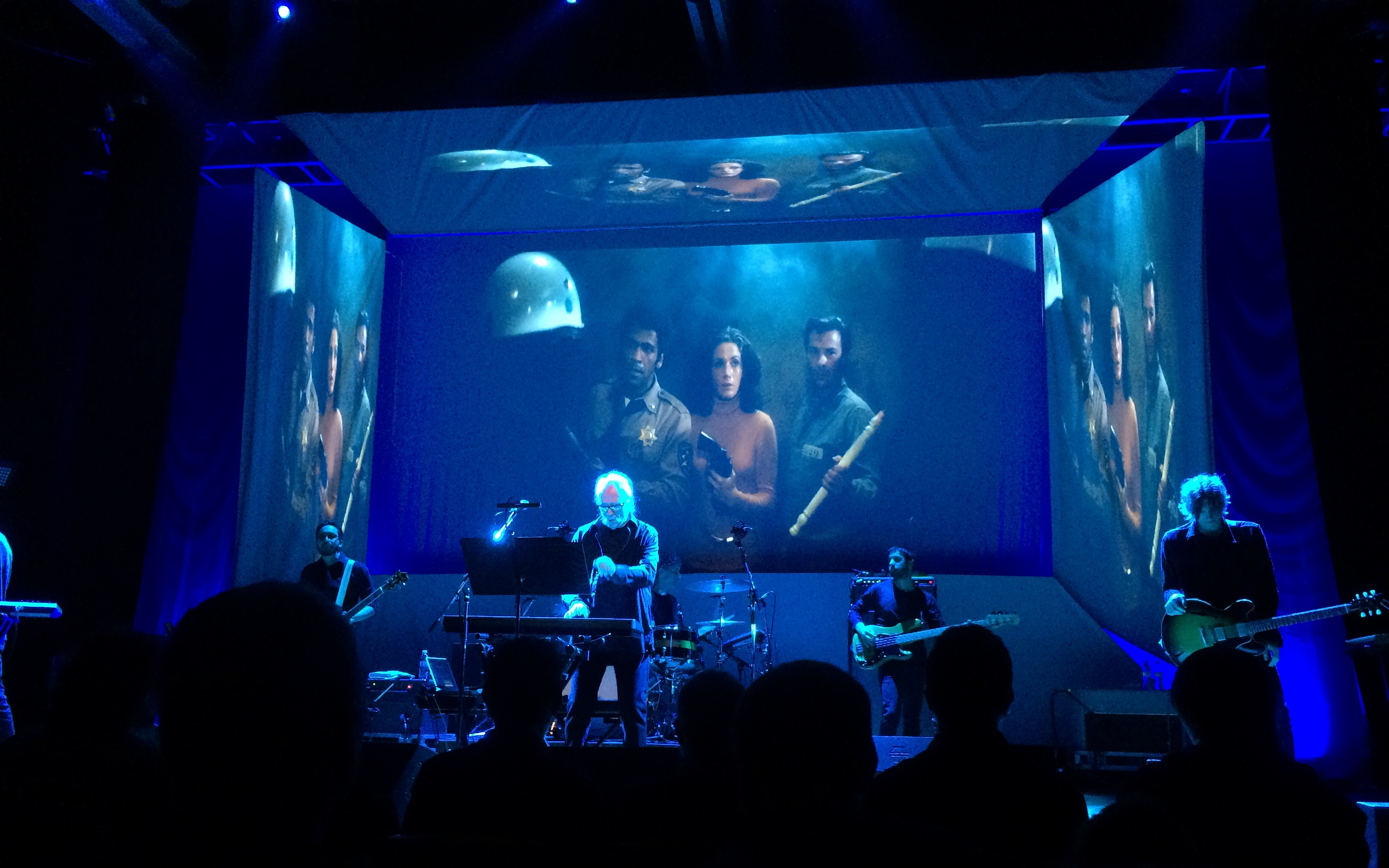
John Carpenter performing in 2016. Carpenter has directed and scored numerous horror films throughout his career.

A horror film score is music used and often specially written for films in the horror genre.

== History ==
Early sound film scores included little music. Universal Studios was among several studios that had a policy of no music under their dialogue, which they felt interfered with it. What little music existed in early sounds films from the studio consisted of a combination of original compositions, classical music, and published music which had been composed for use accompanying silent films. In early 1931, Paramount Pictures initiated the idea of scoring films from beginning to end with music, other studios followed, including Universal creating a fully fledged score for Frankenstein (1931). Just as Universal tended to reuse similar characters, actors and writers for their horror films, they also did so with their music, often using the same music again and again in film in their series.

Film journalist and musician Stephen Thrower stated that following Bernard Herrmann's score to Psycho (1960), horror film soundtracks have rarely been mere background music, noting that James Bernard's music for horror film productions by Hammer have been "gallopingly melodramatic, although one has to say it often raises more giggles than goosebumps".

Neil Lerner, in his book Music in the Horror Film, found that stylistically, the genre allowed for greater freedom for composers to experiment with harmony and instrumentation. Approaches in the 1960s and 1970s included work from Ennio Morricone, who Thrower described as bringing "shuddering, paranoiac quality" based around jazz, electronic effects and "rampant atonal twanging" to films by Dario Argento, Aldo Lado and Lucio Fulci. A short lived trend in the 1970s was for progressive rock scores in horror films following the release of The Exorcist (1973) with "Tubular Bells". Italian progressive rock band Goblin contributed to several scores for Argento, about whom Thrower stated that "like Morricone, they occasionally gave brilliant work to dumb movies" noting their scores to Spasmo and Contamination. The shades of progressive rock were also found in other American productions, such as Carpenter's Halloween, with its main theme having the piano tap out five beats to the bar.

Thrower found that by the 1990s, horror film soundtracks were "stuffed with pop and rock in the hope that the album might shift enough units to reach the charts.", noting the popular success of the soundtrack to Flashdance.

== See also ==
- Halloween music
