= Black Ice (band) =

Black Ice is an American no wave/deathrock band formed in 1999 Oakland, California, by members of The Phantom Limbs, Stevenson Sedjwick and Skot Brown. Additionally, Sedjwick has played in Factory Of Angst, Bloody Melinda and other bands; while Brown has been a member of Anal Kitties, Oliver Klossoff, The Applicators, and Holy Revolver Society.

Initially, Black Ice concentrated on making music with acoustic instruments, samples, and found sounds that they tweaked and twisted through a myriad of studio effects. Their early music was primarily instrumental and was often used in art performances in and around the SF Bay Area at places like Cell Space in San Francisco and Mungasoland in Oakland.

In 2001 Miss Kel (of Red Voice Choir, Sister Mary Shoelace and Noise Collage) joined the band with lead vocals. 2001 also saw the inclusion of the Black Ice track Departure on the "Charm" motion picture soundtrack (5 rue christine). 2001 also saw the addition of Miss Kel (Sister Mary Shoelace) on vocals. The band, now a three piece, set to work on a four-song demo.

Black Ice began by recording a four-song demo in March 2002. Later that year, Kevin Brown and Melanie X of Unicorn Stickers joined the group, respectively playing guitar/drums and keyboards. In 2005 they released Terrible Birds on Hungry Eye Records.

== Discography ==
- 4 Song Demo (band website erroneously credits same six songs as the 10") CDr (Mungaso004) March 2002
- Eve EP 10" (Atakra002), March 2003
- Terrible Birds CD (EYE07), June 2005
- Myopia CD (Eye14), 2007
- Block Ice EP CDr (Mungaso006), 2009
- Before The First Light CD (EYE19), March 2010
- Sooner or Later 7" (ET004), 2011

=== Compilation appearances ===
- A Golden Grouper- "eve e (cello version)"
- GSL Records November 2004
- Nostalgia Del Buio - "striped body"
- Cochon Records August 2004
- Oakland: The Secret is Out - "my eyes hurt"
- Warm and Fuzzy Records August 2004
- New Dark Age Vol. 1 - "eve e"
- Strobelight Records October 2003
- Witches of the West - "stitched up", "the sous"
- Louise Gas & Skot B Records August 2003
- KFJC: Live from the Devil's Triangle Vol. IV - "eve e (live)"
- kfjc 89.7 December 2002
- Charm Motion Picture Soundtrack - "departure"
- 5 rue Christine (ger014) May 2001
