= Nic Nassuet =

- Also known as: Nick Ortiz-Trammell
- Born: Nicholas Bryan Trammell
- Origin: Denver, Colorado
- Genres: Folk, gothic rock, alternative rock, indie rock, indie
- Labels: Dolor Records
- Website: Nic Nassuet

Nicholas Bryan Trammell, better known by his stage name Nic Nassuet and also known professionally as Nick Ortiz-Trammell, is an American gothic-folk musician based in Hollywood, California.

== Career ==
After years of work with theater group PHAMALY and as a part of the SAG-AFTRA national communications committee where he was noted for facilitating SAG eligibility, Nassuet's debut album Eleutherios was released in 2015 to critical acclaim. Jetset Magazine described his debut release as "[a] blend of Celtic, blues, rock, folk, grunge and goth" that "explores and transcends his [Nassuet's] musical boundaries with a true sense of freedom." He also saw radio play on a variety of independent stations.

== Musical style ==
The Huffington Post, has referred to his signature style as "Gothic Folk", a moniker echoed in a June 2015 review by Guardian Liberty Voice. The Global Music Awards gave Nassuet a gold medal for "Alternative Rock Gothic Folk". Review Fix said that Nassuet "put a definable face on the gothic rock genre." Blogcritics compared his style to the Celtic music, Operatic Rock, and Grunge genres. and Big Sky State Buzz said that Eleutherios contained "hints of rock and roll." Nassuet's music has been compared to Jim Morrison, Jeff Buckley, Nick Drake, Richie Havens, Lindsay Buckingham, and Danny Elfman, Meanwhile, his singing has garnered comparisons to singers like Lindsey Buckingham, Axl Rose, and Kate Bush.

== Discography ==
Throe (2015, Dolor Records)

Eleutherios (2015, Dolor Records)

== Awards ==
Year	Award	Nominated work	Category	Result	
2015	Hollywood Music in Media Awards	"She Rides Moonlight"	Best Americana/Folk/Acoustic Song	Nominated	
2015	International Music And Entertainment Association Awards	"The Giver"	Alternative Song Of The Year	Won	
2015	International Music And Entertainment Association Awards	"Eleutherios"	Alternative Album Of The Year	Nominated	
2015	International Music And Entertainment Association Awards	"Eleutherios"	Folk Artist Of The Year	Nominated	
2015	International Music And Entertainment Association Awards	"Eleutherios"	Adult Contemporary Artist Of The Year	Nominated	
2015	International Music And Entertainment Association Awards	"Down"	Adult Contemporary Song Of The Year	Nominated	
2015	"Immured"	Best Americana/Alternative Rock Song	Won		
2015	"The Nothing"	Best Folk/Alternative Rock Song	Won		
2015	"Black Dress"	Best Alternative/Acoustic Rock Song	Won		
2015	"Eleutherios"	Best Rock Album	Won		
2015	2015	Australian Songwriters Association	"Black Dress"	International	Nominated
2015	Global Music Awards	"Eleutherios"	Emerging Artist	Won	
2015	Global Music Awards	"Eleutherios"	Album	Won	
2015	Global Music Awards	"Eleutherios"	Alternative Rock: Gothic Folk	Won	
2015	Indie Music Awards	"When It Falls"	Best Alternative Male Artist	Won	
2015	Indie Music Awards	"Immured"	Best Male Folk Artist	Nominated	
2015	Indie Music Awards	"The Nothing"	Best Male Folk Artist	Nominated	
2015	Indie Music Awards	"Immured"	Best Folk Recording	Nominated	
2015	Indie Music Awards	"She Rides The Moonlight"	Best Folk Recording	Nominated	
2016	Indie Music Awards	"Down"	Best Alternative Artist	Won	
2016	Indie Music Awards	"The Giver"	Best Alternative Artist	Nominated	
2016	Indie Music Awards	"Down"	Best Alternative Song	Nominated	
2016	Indie Music Awards	"The Giver"	Best Alternative Song	Nominated	
2016	Indie Music Awards	"How The Gods Kill"	Best Alternative Demo	Nominated	
2016	Indie Music Awards	"Down"	Best Alternative Recording	Nominated	
2016	Indie Music Awards	"The Giver"	Best Alternative Recording	Nominated	
2016	Indie Music Awards	"The Giver"	Best Alternative Band	Nominated	
2016	Indie Music Awards	"Down"	Best Alternative Band	Nominated	
2016	Indie Music Awards	"Down"	Best Folk Artist	Nominated	
2016	Indie Music Awards	"The Giver"	Best Folk Artist	Nominated	
2016	Indie Music Awards	"How The Gods Kill"	Best Folk Demo	Nominated	
2016	Indie Music Awards	"Eleutherios"	Album Of The Year	Nominated	

== Honors ==
Proclamation of Heroism, Denver city council.

Nic Nassuet Day, May 22, 2016, Issued by proclamation of the Mayor of Denver

Diploma of Merit, Association of the Knights of St. Sylvester

== See also ==
- Neofolk
- List of gothic rock artists
