= Devil Master =

US musical group

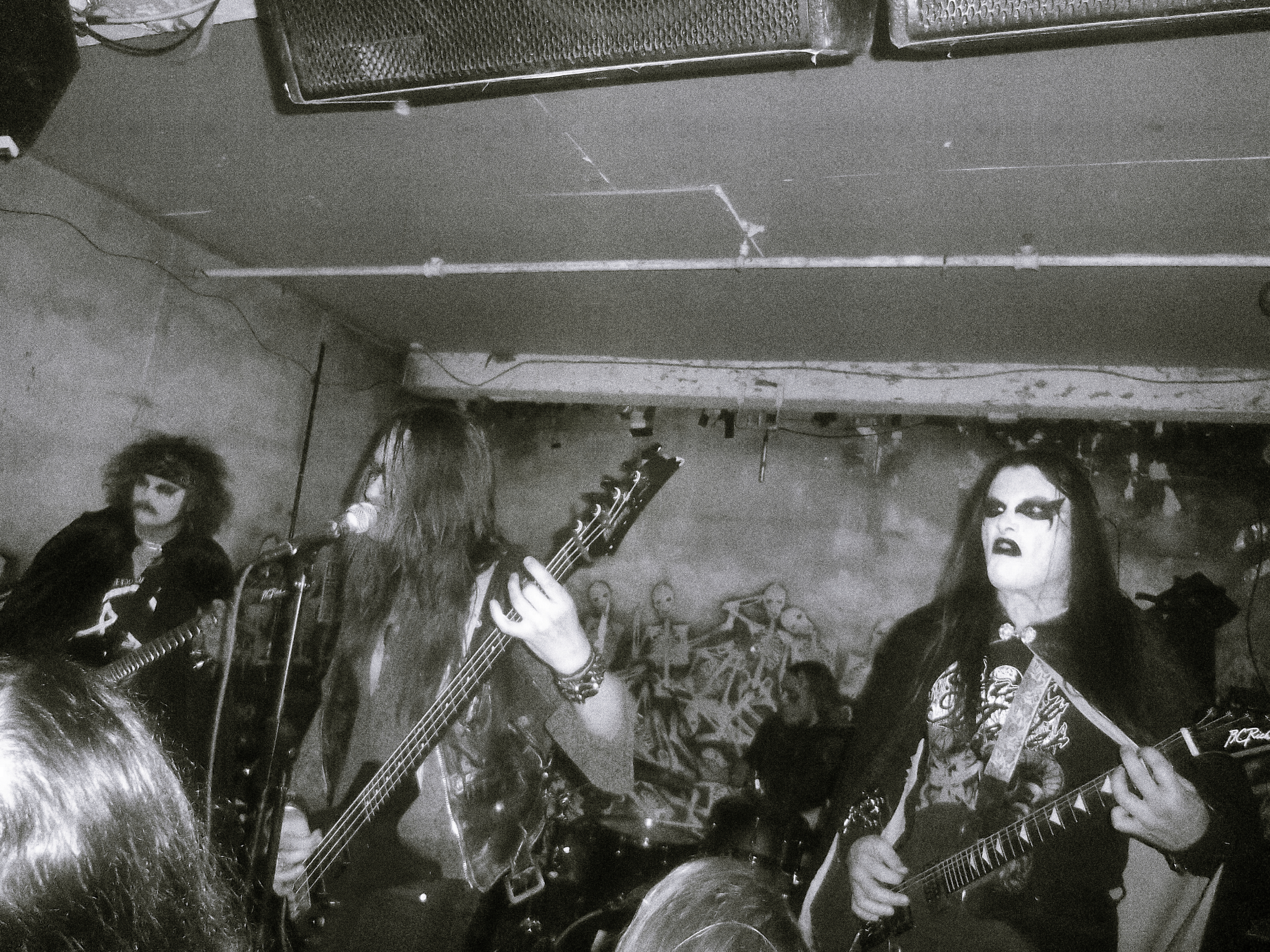
- Devil Master performing live in 2024

Background information
- Origin: Philadelphia, Pennsylvania, U.S.
- Genres: Black metal; deathrock
- Years active: 2015–present
- Labels: Relapse, Bat Magick
- Spinoffs: Scarab
- Spinoff of: Cape of Bats; Low Charge; Slutlust
- Members: Francis Kano; John Hayes; Max Hamell; Sean Lafferty
- Past members: Cassidy McGinley; Max Gordon; Zach "Del" Worshim

Devil Master is an American rock band from Philadelphia, Pennsylvania. Formed in 2015, the band embraced Japanese hardcore, while also merging black metal and deathrock. They have released two studio albums, two demos, and a live album.

== History ==
Devil Master was formed in late 2015 by Francis Kano and John Hayes to explore their interest in early Japanese hardcore. Hayes recruited vocalist Max Hammel, whom he had played with in Slutlust, while Kano recruited bassist Cassidy McGinley, whom he played with in Cape of Bats, and keyboard player Max Gordon, whom he played with in Low Charge. Gordon enlisted Zach "Del" Worshim. The band released their debut self-titled demo on October 27, 2016, through Grim Winds Records, which sold all 100 physical cassette tape versions.

On October 30, 2017, they released their second demo, Inhabit The Corpse, which too sold all its physical copies. On September 18, 2018, a music video for the demo's song "Obscene Charade" was released, edited by Dwid Hellion. That day, the band announced they had signed to Relapse Records, and that their two demos would be released on vinyl as the Manifestations compilation album.

On January 8, 2019, the band released the single "Desperate Shadow", and announced it would be a part of their debut album, Satan Spits on Children of Light. The album's second single, "Black Flame Candle", was released on February 5, 2019, and its third single, "Her Thirsty Whip", was released on February 26. The album was officially released on March 1. Between May 1 and June 3, they toured the United States, supporting Skeletonwitch, alongside Soft Kill, Martyrdöd, Wiegedood and Portrayal of Guilt. Between September 27 and October 25, they toured the United States and Canada supporting Obituary alongside Abbath and Midnight. Between November 7 and December 7, they toured the United States and Canada supporting High on Fire and Power Trip, alongside Creeping Death.

On March 8, 2022, the band released the single "Acid Black Mass", as well as announced new drummer and keyboardist Chris Ulsh, a member of Power Trip. On March 29, 2022, they released the single "The Vigour Of Evil", accompanied by a music video directed by Hayden Hall. The singles were included as a part of the band's second album, Ecstasies of Never Ending Night, released on April 29, 2022. Between May 29 and 23 July 2022, they headlined a tour of the United States and Canada. This was followed by three dates supporting My Chemical Romance: August 29 in Philadelphia, September 27 in Houston and September 28 in Dallas. From April 12 to 24, they headlined a tour of Europe with support from Lamp of Murmuur. Between October 31 and December 3, 2023, they headlined a tour of the United States and Canada, with support from Fuming Mouth and Final Gasp.

On January 8, 2024, the band announced their own record label, Bat Magick Records, releasing the band's live cassette Vile Twisted Magick Process and the debut self-titled EP by drummer Sean Lafferty's band Glorious Decent the same day. From April 8 to 20, they toured Europe supporting Cult Leader. Between February 21 and March 18, 2024, they toured the United States alongside Hulder, Necrofier and Worm.

== Musical style and influences ==
Critics have categorized Devil Master's music as black metal and deathrock. Writers for Metal Injection and Decibel have used the term "vampunk" to reference their sound, while MetalSucks editor-in-chief Emperor Rhombus calls them "sleaze-thrash", and BrooklynVegan and Metal Injection have used "blackened punk". They often incorporate elements of glam metal, burning spirits, anarcho-punk, crust punk, glam rock, punk rock, post-punk, San Diego emo, the new wave of British heavy metal, Japanese hardcore, thrash metal, death metal and D-beat. Writer G.S. Richter described them as "an intoxicating brew that sounds like first-era Christian Death caught in mid-lycanthropic transformation into Sabbat." Treble magazine writer Jeff Terich stated their sound is "As much hardcore as they are metal, and as much metal as they are goth and death-rock".

They make use of tongue-in-cheek pseudonyms, imagery and themes referencing those of black metal, while members also acknowledge their own beliefs in Satanism and practice of chaos magic.

They have cited musical influences including G.I.S.M., Zouo, Morbid, Mobs, Gastunk, Ghoul, the Execute, Christian Death, Bathory, Celtic Frost, Gorgoroth, Mighty Sphincter, Mayhem and Darby Crash of the Germs. They have also cited the films of David Lynch, particularly Eraserhead (1977), Dario Argento, Kenneth Anger, Carnival of Souls and The Vampyr; the writings of Comte de Lautréamont, Charles Baudelaire and Arthur Rimbaud; as well as the soundtracks of Castlevania, Mega Man and Dark Souls as impactful.

== Members ==
Current

- Francis "Darkest Prince" Kano – guitar (2015–present)
- John "Hades Apparition" Hayes – guitar (2015–present)
- Max "Disembody Through Unparalleled Pleasure" Hamell– vocals (2015–present), bass (2020–present)
- Sean "Wrought by Fathomless Hands" Lafferty – drums (2023–present)

Former

- Cassidy "Spirit Mirror" McGinley – bass (2015–2020)
- Max "Dodder" Gordon – keyboard (2015–2020)
- Zach "Del" Worshim – drums (2015–2020)
- Chris "Festering Terror in Deepest Catacomb" Ulsh – drums, keyboard (2022–2023)

== Discography ==
Albums

- Satan Spits on Children of Light (2019)
- Ecstasies of Never Ending Night (2022)
- Bloody Dreams (2026)

Demos

- Devil Master (2016)
- Inhabit The Corpse (2017)

Live

- Vile Twisted Magick Process (2024)

Compilations

- Manifestations (2018)
