= Sluka (band) =

- Origin: San Diego, California, U.S.
- Genres: Rock, gothic rock
- Years active: 1989–present
- Labels: Meldac (1989–1990); Time Warner (1993); Steel Flower Music (1994–present)
- Members: Christopher Sluka; Anna Eppink; Lis Viegas; Alexandra Holt
- Past members: Charlton Pettus; Chris Iannuzi; Denis Sluka; Nico Looser

Sluka is an American rock band based in San Diego, California, led by musician and songwriter Christopher Sluka. The band has released multiple studio albums since 1989, initially on the Japanese label Meldac before founding their own imprint, Steel Flower Music, in 1994.

== History ==
Sluka began developing a following in New York City while Christopher Sluka was studying at New York University and Queens College. Recordings under the Sluka name were subsequently made in Japan, where they recorded and released the debut studio album, Emotional Battlefield, on Meldac Records in 1989. A second album, Fear of Ordinary Life, followed on the same label in 1990.

In 1993, Sluka released Lost in This World in Italy through Time Warner, with publishing handled by Warner Chappell Music Italiana.

Sluka later became based in San Diego and began releasing recordings through Steel Flower Music, through which all subsequent recordings have been released. Over the following two decades, the band released a series of studio albums on the imprint, including A Matter of Perception (1997), A San Diego Zoo (1999), Social Anxiety (2001), Gothic Cavalier, Solo Flight, Introversions (2016), Colorful Radiation (2017), Ready to Connect (2019), and Figure It Out (2021).

The 2021 album "Figure It Out" was reviewed by Cody Conard in The Big Takeover, who described it as one of the band's most theatrical and orchestral releases.

The band released "Cautionary Yell" in 2024. The album was produced by Grammy Award-winning recording engineer and producer Alan Sanderson, based in San Diego who has worked with artists including Fiona Apple, Weezer, and Switchfoot.

== Band members ==
=== Current ===
- Christopher Sluka – guitar, keyboards, vocals
- Anna Eppink – bass, vocals
- Lis Viegas – drums, vocals
- Alexandra Holt – street can, theremin, vocals

=== Past ===
- Charlton Pettus – guitar
- Chris Iannuzi – keyboards
- Denis Sluka – bass
- Nico Looser – drums
