= You Shriek =

American band

- Left to right: John Oleary and Raziel Panic

Background information
- Origin: Boston, Massachusetts, United States
- Genres: Gothic rock, darkwave, industrial
- Years active: 1990–present
- Members: Raziel Panic (1990–); John Oleary (1994–); Skot Kremen (1994–)
- Past members: Jason Arnone (1990-1996)
- Website: youshriek.com

You Shriek is an American band founded in 1990 by Raziel Panic. Their sound includes influences from 1980s 4AD, New Romantic, goth and industrial. They are associated with underground club scenes catering to fans of darkwave, futurepop, and EBM.

== History ==
In late 1990, after briefly seeking and auditioning traditional rock band members, Raziel Panic invited college mate Jason Arnone to record, program and perform with him, alongside MIDI-sequenced synthesizers and other electronic instruments. In 1991 they began playing shows as a duo and released their first cassette mini-album, Suicide Note. The album was made at Boston’s historic Downtown Recorders, where Panic was working as an assistant engineer.

John Oleary (guitar and synthesizers) and Skot Kremen (bass and synthesizers) joined in 1994 to form a complete studio and live act. That year they also released the CD EP, Grim. In 1996, after building a local following on-stage, and releasing their mixes directly to dance clubs, they signed with Mere Mortal Productions to make their first full-length album, Burn Something Dear. Before touring to support the release, Arnone left the group to commit to his work in the visual arts. Panic, Oleary, and Kremen continued to headline and open for touring acts, becoming a staple at Boston goth hotbed Manray.

After Mere Mortal ceased operations, the band took time off from playing live as Panic assembled the Zero Zero Island project studio, with plans to self-produce future releases. The result was the second full-length album, 2004’s Unreal Cities.

By late 2006, the band had completed demos for what was intended to be their first album for their recent signing to Invisible Records, however personal obligations outside the music business had made requisite pre-release touring impossible, and the deal was never completed. To decide on a new direction, the group withdrew from the scene, solely releasing episodes of the video podcast Spies On Zero Zero Island though 2009.

Subsequently, the band began work on new recordings for the aborted third album, re-imagining it as a continuum back to several early, unreleased demos. During this period, Panic contributed to the lengthy beta-test for the Rock Band Network, a user-generated content initiative by game developer Harmonix, where ex-member Arnone was now employed. Two You Shriek songs were made available for the launch of RBN on Xbox 360. Panic cites that rearranging songs for this new medium had a direct impact on their final mixes for the third album, Somewhere Between (Heaven & Sorrow), eventually released in 2011.

== Discography ==
=== Albums ===
- Burn Something Dear (1996)
- Unreal Cities (2003)
- Somewhere Between (Heaven & Sorrow) (2011)

=== Singles and EPs ===
- Suicide Note EP (1991)
- Bela Lugosi’s Dead (1993)
- Grim EP (1994)
- Caesium Fallout EP (2011)
- Hagiography I (2012)

=== Compilation appearances ===
- Oxygen Denial, "Bela Lugosi's Dead" (Duct Tape Terrorism, 1993)
- For Crying Out Loud Chapter 3, "Liars, Beggars, Thieves" and "Trip On This" (FCOL, 1993)
- IndustrialnatioN Sound Compilation Vol. 1, "Bela Lugosi's Dead (V2.0)" (IndustrialnatioN Magazine, 1994)
- Ceremonial: A Tribute To Joy Division, "Warsaw" (Mere Mortal Productions, 1995)
- Mind / Body Compilation Volume 3, "One Point Zero" (Atomic Novelties, 1996)
- Death For Life Vol. 1, "Pandora" (Mere Mortal Productions, 1998)
- Attack [Patterns], "V.01" (Apocalypse Magazine, 1999)
- Tribute: A Tribute To Public Image Limited, "Ease" (Underground Inc., 2005)
- The Free For All! Tour, "New Romantic Circuitry" (Underground Inc., 2005)
- Drowned Visions, "Ever and Anon (DHR Strobe Light Mix)" (Dark Horizons, 2011)
