= Theatre of Ice =

American deathrock band

- Origin: Fallon, Nevada, U.S.
- Genres: Deathrock, gothic rock, horror punk, post-punk
- Years active: 1978–1990
- Labels: Demented Mind Mill, Orphanage
- Past members: Brent Johnson; John Johnson; Eric Johnson; Mark Johnson; Lyle Johnson; John Baradat; Felton Thomas; Dale Garrard; Jay Planty; Ted Priess; Jason Cobb; Craig Moore; George Carlston; Richard Hillquist; Anthony Payton; Doskocil

Theatre of Ice was an American early deathrock band that formed in the Nevada desert in December 1978. Initially formed to record a soundtrack for a horror movie, the members instead evolved into what some claim was the first deathrock band. Owing more initially to experimental groups such as Throbbing Gristle, Suicide and Chrome, the band also cited bands as diverse as Iron Butterfly, Blue Öyster Cult, The Moody Blues and Roxy Music as major influences. Theatre of Ice brought a modern approach to gothic-horror themes by tackling the idea of an underground spook show in the contemporary world.

"Our world is rapidly becoming a theatre of ice. A place where cold passionless vision rules. A place where fear and horror dominate out thinking. Theatre of Ice is a natural extension of this twisted world of ours. Its members seek only to recreate through music the insanity and terror they believe is all around them. They offer the world, both through their live performances and taped offerings, the opportunity to hear what only they have seen."

== The Nevada years (1978–1985) ==
Originally calling themselves The Bleeding Hearts the band recorded several demos during 1978 and 1979. The name was changed to Theatre of Ice at the end of 1979 and reflected the bands notion of a person sitting alone bathed in the silvery cold light of their television, slowing losing touch with reality. They burst onto the cassette culture scene in 1980 with the release of Mouse Blood (a title they would later re-use). Sixty minutes of bizarre noise and songs about death and the end of the world, more than 1000 copies were disseminated throughout the world and garnered the band a recording contract with fledgling Demented Mind Mill Records. Their first album The Haunting was recorded in 1981 in an actual haunted house in the Nevada desert. While thought by many to be just a gimmick the band claimed that it inspired them to create what is one of the more deranged albums to ever be recorded. Rather than opting for one musical style the album alternates between hard razor-sharp, creepy-crawly punk rock with echo like wolf howls to textural synthesizer soundtracks filled with strange noises. But while the musical style varied the themes remained rooted in modern horror.

The original line up included Brent Johnson (vocals, guitar) and his brothers John Johnson (guitar, keyboards, and vocals), Eric Johnson (bass guitar), Mark Johnson (drums) and Lyle Johnson (electronics). In describing the songmaking process Brent Johnson was quoted as saying: "We approach every song like painting a picture. The subject comes first, then the tones, color and shades necessary to set the mood. The actual structure of the song (i.e. the tune) is the least important. We never set out to do something "different" or "original", nor do we attempt to be "mainstream" -- things just end up how they end up."

Their second album Beyond the Graves of Passion received much of the same critical acclaim that their first album received. Simultaneously scarier and more accessible, the album had the effect of polarizing their audience into two camps; those that considered the band to be basically a kitschy novelty act and those that thought Theatre of Ice to be unholy prophets from the underworld. Ultimately the album failed to garner the group a wider audience beyond their small, but rabid, cult following and was considered a major disappointment by their record company. It was also during this time that groups of devotees began following the band from show to show often performing bizarre rituals before, during and after shows. Several altercations between the band and their devotees, combined with poor album sales, lead the band to consider disbanding. The most infamous of these altercations occurred in August 1983 when a group of crazed fans abducted the band for nearly 48 hours before a performance in Reno, Nevada. No arrests were ever made but the band refused to play live for many years and to this date most of their performances go unpublicized.

The final live performance of Theatre of Ice (at least that is what it was believed to be at the time) took place during the autumnal equinox in 1983 in a vast alkaline desert flat, littered with hundreds of dead animal skeletons, and located about 25 miles from the family's farm in remote Fallon, Nevada. A huge wooden TOI symbol was burned while the band played nearly every song from their first 2 albums along with several earlier works. Although the location was remote and was not well publicized, several hundred "devotees" attended the performance. The similarities in location and date between this event and what some few years later would become known as the Burning Man Festival are quite startling. Ironically the band closed the event playing "The Burning Man" from The Haunting.

A Cool Dark Place to Die was initially conceived as a solo project for lead vocalist Brent Johnson but instead became the band's third and one of their most critically acclaimed work. Since the only condition under which the band would reform was if they were never asked to perform live again, a commitment they were never able to keep, the songs took on a far more experimental and unearthly quality. Featuring incredibly effective spooky ambiance, they all but totally abandoned their punk rock roots for a far more electronic sound. This time the band choose to record in various ghost town cemeteries located throughout the Nevada desert. Perhaps more mood than music it was still reviewed by almost every music magazine as Death Rock and acclaimed as unlike anything heard before. "Densely rich cemetery songs. Synthesizers projecting ethereal dischords to the back of the head; quiet but crashing guitars; unconventional percussion, and vocals that sound as if they are about to commit suicide. Oh baby, groove to the sound of the gentle annihilation beat. I've had to rescue this album from coveters more than once. Morbid minds think alike and perversity is a shared trait. Mortals stick with this – prophets should be heard if not endured".

Mouse Blood was intended to be the band's final offering as brothers Brent and John moved to Utah to attend college at Brigham Young University and brothers Eric and Mark departed on missions for the Church of Jesus Christ of Latter-day Saints in Georgia and Connecticut. Labeled as "A limited edition sampling of the works of Theatre of Ice as chosen by friends who hate the band" it included songs from their first three albums as well as a few newly recorded tracks. The new songs were recorded in an old abandoned barn located on the family farm. At the conclusion of the recording process the band chose to set fire to the barn and with it destroy all lyric sheets, correspondences, tapes, photos and videos that were in their possession. They basically were attempting to destroy any and all evidence that the band had ever existed (with the obvious exception of the 4 albums they had recorded). Lead singer Brent Johnson was quoted as saying, "Only fire can destroy the monsters we have created". It was also rumored that the band had committed suicide in the firery blaze, a rumor it is believed the band encouraged.

The album, however, was heralded by the music press as one of the most innovative albums of the decade. Alternative Press wrote: "Think of Poe's Black Cat as a reference point for Mouse Blood. As in Poe the suggestion of insanity always lays close to a formal artistic surface. Imagine Poe living in the contemporary family, and then you'll sense how Mouse Blood flows through the dark night of domestic horror. Theatre of Ice sounds far more uncompromising than Bauhaus or The Cure in their search for the sublime within the dark hidden regions of themselves. What stands revealed is the core connection between gothic rock and American Romanticism. Theatre of Ice is concerned not only with the geography of the soul but that of the American West. In this sense, their songs of premature burial take on a deep suggestiveness. The formal horror of Theatre of Ice is nothing less than bizarre horror of the American West; a land of nuclear test sites, animal carcass dumps, and Mormon catacombs."

== The Utah years 1985–1988 ==
With Mouse Blood selling in record numbers and receiving such high critical acclaim, the Demented Mind Mill convinced Brent and John Johnson to record one more album. The label had recently released a number of highly unsuccessful albums and was in need of money badly. Dale Garrard, who had spent time as a guitarist in both Chrome and P.O.A. joined the band as lead guitarist, and Theatre of Ice was once again "creating monsters". The brothers Johnson actually first meet Garrard in a Provo, Utah, cemetery at almost precisely the stroke of midnight. The Johnsons were there to take some flash photos for their new album, what Garrard was doing there is not known. But the idea of running into a guitarist of his caliber in a cemetery at midnight was seen as a sign of "interesting" things to come.

The band immediately began work on their fifth album The Resurrection, the title referring to the band rising once again from the dead. With Dale Garrard, John and Brent Johnson all playing guitar as well as other instruments the album took on a dark, heavy, near metal sound; this was not seen initially as a positive direction for the band by their label who wanted them to stick closer to the sound of their previous two albums, which had become the biggest commercial successes the Demented Mind Mill had. The label soon changed their mind when promotional versions of "Gone With The Worms", and "Tomorrow Never Comes", the first two songs released for the new album, received favorable responses from radio stations across Europe.

The Resurrection was the first album the band did not attempt to record entirely at some remote haunted" location. No haunted houses, and with the exception of 2 songs, no cemeteries. It is not completely known chronologically which songs were recorded first – so it is not known whether the events that occurred when recording "She Sleeps" and "Holy Holy Cry" led to the decision to end the "haunted location recording sessions" or not. What is well documented is that the band chose a small unused and seldom cared for cemetery to record these two previously mentioned dark and moody pieces. During the play-back of "Holy Holy Cry" it is reported by all who were present that something could be heard rapidly moving through the grass, weeds, and bushes toward the grave where the band had set up to record. The sound was almost like that of galloping beast, it is said. Suddenly an invisible force burst out of the darkness and fell upon all who were there – and then left just as suddenly. It is widely held that this event led to John Johnson leaving the band upon completion of the album.

Recording completed just before Christmas 1985 and the album was set to be released in early 1986. Despite their commitment to never play live again, at the conclusion of the recording process the band played an impromptu concert in the isolated mountain town of Payson, Arizona. Live versions of the previously released Funeral Games and the newly penned Santa Claws (written 30 minutes before they took the stage) were included on The Resurrection in an attempt to end the rumors that the band had indeed committed suicide six months earlier in the "Mouse Blood Fire", a rumor that had continued to grow despite the announced release of a newly recorded album.

The Resurrection proved, however, to be the death knell for the Demented Mind Mill. Although another critical success for the band it sold very poorly; it is debatable whether its poor sales led to the closing of the Demented Mind Mill or whether the impending bankruptcy of the Demented Mind Mill led to the albums poor sales. To this date it is unknown how many actual copies were pressed or sold, the album is almost impossible to find and rarely comes up for sale on any of the internet auction sites.

Orphanage Records, an American label with a solid reputation in the Gothic Rock and Death rock music scenes, offered to re-release The Resurrection; but were unable to obtain any of the masters, except for the two live recordings, from the Demented Mind Mill. So Orphanage Records asked the band to re-record seven of the songs from the album, one from The Haunting, two from Beyond the Graves of Passion, nine new originals, and reuse the two live recordings. These 17 "new" songs were released in 1986 as Love... Is Like Dying. Even though John Johnson is credited as playing on the album, it is a known fact that he had previously left the group and only appears on the two live recordings.

Love... Is Like Dying was an immediate success for both the band and for their new label. With songs as diverse as "Dreams of Fire" and "In The Attic", the album greatly increased their fan base and for the first time put them on the radar of college radio stations across the country. This opened the door for the band to tour parts of the country it had never played live to, it was just up to their label to assure them that "nothing bad would happen" if they were to go on an extended tour.

During the fall of 1986 the band committed to its only extended tour of the United States. To accommodate the tour three new members were added to the band; Jay Planty on guitar, Ted Preiss on bass, and Jason Cobb on drums. For the most part the tour was uneventful, playing mostly as a supporting act, the group performed before crowds that were largely unfamiliar with their history. On New Year's Eve, 1986, the tour concluded in Fallon, Nevada, the birthplace of the band, with a performance in what had long been alleged to be a haunted slaughterhouse. A large concrete edifice, the abandoned slaughterhouse had been the site of many strange sightings and the subject of local ghost stories for over 20 years. More of a video shoot and recording session than an actual concert, it was made open to the public and several hundred of the locals braved the spirits and the cold to attend the show. With their now stripped down, punkier sound, the band tore through several versions of "In the Attic", "Miron", "Gone With the Worms", "A Cool Dark Place to Die", "Red Asphalt" and "Within the Ruins of a Mind". The concert was intended to conclude at the stroke of midnight, ushering in the New Year. But sometime slightly after 11:00pm a bizarre event occurred; all the power suddenly turned off and the slaughterhouse was thrown into total blackness. A few seconds later an unearthly moan howled forth from every speaker and amplifier. An other worldly wail that lasted nearly 30 seconds. Stunned and terrified, the majority of the crowd hastily dispersed and the concert came to a screeching halt. To this date it is still a matter of speculation as to whether this was an actual supernatural occurrence, or was staged by the band in an attempt to add to their mystique and legend. What is known is that Jay Planty, Ted Preiss, and Jason Cobb left the band after the event. Planty and Preiss would return several years later, but this was the last time the band recorded at any alleged haunted sites or cemeteries. Three of the Songs from the session were chosen to be released as the band's first seven-inch EP, In the Attic. Along with the title track the record included "Gone with the Worms" and "Within the Ruins of a Mind". The record was a howling success and was the first in what would be a long string of seven inch EPs the band would release.

Immediately after returning from Nevada the band began work on their next album, The Dead. The first album to be recorded entirely in a studio, all of the tracks were written and recorded by Brent Johnson and Dale Garrard. The album departed greatly from all of their previous efforts and included several mainstream sounding rock songs with slick production values. The departure was so great that Orphanage Records decided not to release it under the band's name, choosing instead to release it under the name Oblivion Now. It was only through a miscommunication with the printers and pressing plant that the wrong cover and labels were printed and The Dead became the band's seventh album. A tremendous failure with fans and non-fans alike, the album was literally pulled from the shelves and scrapped.

To erase the failure of The Dead the decision was made to record a live album. Three new members were again added to the band; Craig Moore on guitar, George Carlston on bass, and Richard Hillquist on drums. Live… Beyond the Graves of Utah was recorded during the summer of 1988. "Summertime in small-town Utah. Beautiful tree lined streets, families picnicking in the park, children laughing and playing. A scene straight out of Leave it to Beaver. But something was about to descend upon happy valley. During the summer of 1988 Theatre of Ice toured Utah playing anywhere they could – V.F.W. halls, jr. high auditoriums, movie theaters, skating rinks, hamburger joints, even an abandoned grocery store. The crowds varied in size and enthusiasm, but one thing was certain, they'd never forget what they saw and heard. It's been said by many before; Theatre of Ice was a lousy band live. So why a live CD? Perhaps their detractors expected them to try and reproduce their dark, gloomy syntho-beats live. But that's not what a Theatre of Ice show was about. Instead they packed away their patented electronic experimentation, cranked up the guitars and stepped into high gear. Vocals shouted rather than sung, guitars thrashed and drums beaten rather than played. It was always more about the experience than the music. Songs about killing girlfriends, suicidal maniacs, and child molesters were undoubtedly not the normal family home evening fare in small-town Utah. But for one evening during the summer of 1988 it was. You can make your own decision as to whether Theatre of Ice was a lousy band live or not. Just ask yourself one question – would you like to have been one of the unsuspecting present when Theatre of Ice took the stage?"

During the tour, the newly penned song, "Kill Your Girlfriend," quickly became the climax of each performance. So it was no surprise that Orphanage Records decided to release a live version of the song as the title track of the band's next 7 inch ep. Easily the crudest and sloppiest recording the band had yet to release, it rapidly became the group's largest selling record. Punk rock periodicals like Flipside (fanzine) and Maximum Rock N' Roll, which had previously dismissed the band as arty and pretentious, wrote rave reviews of the record. "Demented, sick, deranged, perverted, degrading -- In other words, pure enjoyment. This is brilliant raunchy rock and roll, obviously the product of disturbed minds. Parental guidance suggested." With the band now at the zenith of its popularity, the decision was made to relocate to Phoenix, Arizona; the home of Orphanage Records.

== Death of band members ==
Brent Johnson, founder of Theatre of Ice, died on February 20, 2017, in Avondale, Arizona.

Mark Johnson, an original member of Theatre of Ice, died December 4, 2003, near Florence Junction, Arizona.

== Discography ==
Studio albums

Title	Year	Label
Mouse Blood 1981	1981	Demented Mind Mill
The Haunting	1982	Demented Mind Mill
Beyond the Graves of Passion	1983	Demented Mind Mill
A Cool Dark Place to Die	1984	Demented Mind Mill
Mouse Blood	1985	Demented Mind Mill
The Resurrection	1986	Demented Mind Mill
Love... Is Like Dying	1986	Orphanage Records
The Dead	1987	Orphanage Records
Murder the Dawn	1990	Orphanage Records

Live albums

Title	Year	Label
Live Beyond the Graves of Utah	1988	Harsh Reality Music
Live is a Wild and Scarey Thing	1993	Orphanage Records

EPs

Title	Year	Label
In The Attic	1987	Orphanage Records
Kill Your Girlfriend	1988	Orphanage Records
This is What You Get for Christsmas	1988	Orphanage Records
It's All Over Now	1989	Orphanage Records
Rock Star Autopsy	1991	Orphanage Records
Radio Has Gone Insane	1991	Orphanage Records

Compilation albums

Title	Year	Label
Life is a Wild and Scarey Thing Greatest Hits Package	1992	Orphanage Records
Lurid Little Lies Greatest Hits Package	2001	Self-released
More Fun Than You Deserve Pop Hits Package	2001	Self-released
Death Becomes You Punk/Garage Hits Package	2002	Self-released
From the Cold Dark Regions Gothic/Deathrock Package	2002	Self-released
