= The Phantom Limbs =

- Origin: Oakland, California
- Genres: Post-punk, no wave, horror punk, deathrock, gothic rock, electropunk
- Years active: 1999–2004
- Labels: Alternative Tentacles, Gold Standard Labs, Hungry Eye Records, Atakra, Mungaso Productions, Trans Solar
- Website: www.thephantomlimbs.com

The Phantom Limbs were a rock band formed in Oakland, California, in 1999. The group combined the unusual keyboard-driven compositions of Stevenson Sedgwick with an aggressive, punk-influenced rhythm section and a very odd singer, Loto 'Hopeless' Ball, whose howled lyrics and unpredictable stage behavior quickly gained them an infamous reputation in the SF Bay Area.

They were quickly approached by Sam Atakra of the fledgling Atakra records label, which released their first 3-song 7-inch, featuring their seminal "Hot Knives and Hornets."

With critical acclaim for their live shows and 7-inch recordings, the group was approached by Jello Biafra of the Dead Kennedys and were signed to his seminal label, Alternative Tentacles, on the spot. After seeing the band at 924 Gilman St in Berkeley, he declared them the strangest band that he had ever see there, let alone that the punks actually liked.

Their debut full-length Applied Ignorance was released on Alternative Tentacles in 2001. A US tour followed. The group released two more full-length records on Alternative Tentacles, as well as singles, an EP and many compilation tracks on various labels including Gold Standard Labs, Hungry Eye Records and Trans Solar in Germany.

The band completed two more US tours and a two tours of Europe, playing over 200 shows in total. The group played shows with many notable acts including Jello Biafra, the Melvins, Neurosis, The Vanishing, The Fleshies, Neptune, and The Holy Kiss, among others.

== History ==
On 6 November 1999 the Phantom Limbs played their first show at the Port-Lite, a dive bar in Oakland.

August 2000 – Jason "Jumanji" Miller permanently joins the limbs on guitar.

November 2000 – Release of first 7-inch on Atakra Records.

In December 2000, Jello Biafra of the Dead Kennedys witnessed the Limbs at 924 Gilman Street in Berkeley, declares they are the strangest band he has ever witnessed at Gilman and signs them to his label, Alternative Tentacles on the spot.

In May 2001, the Phantom Limbs and Fleshies release a split seven-inch. Each covers a song from the other band.

May 2001 – Limbs release the Chicago Kid / Mungaso production The Early Years 1999-2000 DVD

12 May 2001 – Limbs play infamous gig at the Alternative Tentacles Showcase at the Great American Music Hall and ruin the carpet.

August 2001 – Applied Ignorance is released on Alternative Tentacles.

September 2001 – First US tour.

June 2002 – Second US tour.

October 2002 – First European tour.

May 2003 – Limbs record with Dan Rathbun of SleepyTimeGorillaMuseum at Polymorph Studios in Oakland, CA.

September 2003 – Limbs release their second album, Displacement on Alternative Tentacles.

October 2003 – 4 song Euro 7-inch w/ Mono Brutal comic comes out on Trans-solar Records in Germany. Features exclusive cover of the Screamers "122 Hours of Fear"

October 2003 – Third and final US Tour. Limbs go to Graceland. Their beloved '79 Dodge B200 breaks down outside of Tupelo. Limbs spend several days in the hometown of Elvis.

October 2003 – Limbs voted best "rock" band in San Francisco by San Francisco Weekly readers poll.

December 2003 – split 7-inch with the Vanishing released on Hungry Eye Records

May(?) 2004 – Limbs play last San Francisco show ever at Edinburg Castle.

May(?) 2004 – Displacement released on Trans-Solar Records in Europe.

September 2004 – Limbs play last US show ever in Oakland.

October 2004 – Second and Final European tour.

23 October 2004 – limbs play last show ever in Berlin, Germany @ Mad n' Crazy.

March 2005 – Limbs release final record, Random Hymns EP on GSL. The controversial track, "Jackalope Rising", is alternately called "stunning", "one of the more original, in your face tracks in recorded history", and "a great mistake" by the critics.

31 October 2005 – Limbs officially disband.

2009 Limbs release "Accept the Juice / Whole Loto Love" CD/DVD - a CD of rarities and a DVD of live footage and bonus features

17 June 2018 - Limbs reunite for Jello Biafra's 60th birthday party at Great American Music Hall in San Francisco, California.

== Members ==
- Loto Hopeless Ball: vocals
- Stevenson Sedgwick: keyboards, songwriting
- Sköt B: bass, keyboard
- Jason Miller: guitar
- Mike Klösoff: drums

Additional members:

- Ben H.: original guitarist for first three shows
- Kundalini: guitar, appeared on the track "Murder Us Windpipes"

== Discography ==
=== Albums ===
- Applied Ignorance (LP, Alternative Tentacles (Virus 263), August 2001)
- Displacement (LP, Alternative Tentacles (Virus 305)/Tran Solar, September 2003)
- Random Hymns (EP, Gold Standard Labs (GSL 104) February 2005)
- Accept the Juice / Whole Loto Love (CD/DVD Alternative Tentacles (Virus 392) 2009)

=== Seven inch singles ===
- "Hot Knives and Hornets" (Atakra 001, November 2000)
- "Fleshies/Phantom Limbs Split" (Mungaso 002/SPAM 032, May 2001)
- "Patience" (Hungry Eye 002, December 2003)
- "The Euro 7-inch w/ Mono Brutal Comic" (Trans Solar 016, October 2003)
- "Vanishing/Phantom Limbs Split" (Hungry Eye 003, December 2003)

=== Other media ===
- The Phantom Limbs: The Early Years 1999-2000 (Video - Mungaso 003 / DVD - Mungaso 005, May 2001)
