= Option (music magazine) =

American music magazine

- Issue #69, July/August 1996.
- Executive editor: Scott Becker
- Categories: Music magazine
- Frequency: Bimonthly
- Circulation: 14500 (1989); 27000 (1995)
- Publisher: Scott Becker
- First issue: March–April 1985
- Final issue Number: July–August 1998; 81
- Company: Sonic Options Network; Supersonic Media Inc.
- Country: United States
- Based in: Los Angeles
- Language: English
- Website: Option at the Wayback Machine (archived 2012-08-08)
- ISSN: 0882-178X

Option (subtitled Music Alternatives, then Music Culture) was a music magazine based in Los Angeles, California, US. It covered independent, underground and alternative music and multiple musical genres for an international subscription base. Its print run began in 1985 and ended in 1998.

== History ==
Originally called OPtion, it, along with Sound Choice, were the dual successors to the earlier music magazine OP, published by John Foster and the Lost Music Network and known for its diverse scope and the role it played in providing publicity to DIY musicians in the midst of the cassette culture. When Foster ended OP after only twenty-six issues, he held a conference, offering the magazine's resources to parties interested in carrying on; attendant journalist David Ciaffardini went on to start Sound Choice, while Scott Becker, alongside Richie Unterberger, founded Option. Whereas Sound Choice was described as a low-budget and "chaotic" publication in spirit, Option was characterized as a "profit making operation" right at the start, meant to compete with the newly founded Spin.

The magazine began as a small press publication, described by the New Music Periodicals review of the Music Library Association as "encompassing rock, jazz, classical, and electronic forms". The New York Times noted its dedication to coverage of indie music releases, with each issue containing "hundreds" of reviews: "not all rock by any means, but it's hard to imagine the existence of Option before punk rock." The magazine used 40-50 unpaid reviewers at a time, few of whom were professional critics.

One given issue's musicians profiled included "New Orleans's proto-jazz outfit the Dirty Dozen Brass Band and bluesman Walter "Wolfman" Washington; Indian pop-traditionalist Najma Akhtar; vanguard composer and pianist Cecil Taylor; Yugoslavia's ideological rockers, Laibach; Texas R&B veteran Doug Sahm; Brit dance funkateers Wolfgang Press". According to Becker, the editors conscientiously debated as to whether cover subjects such as Frank Zappa and Siouxsie and the Banshees were "too well known".

By the late 1980s, Option had built up a reputation for its coverage of alternative and underground music scenes, regardless of genre or nationality. The San Francisco Chronicle called it "the top all-round music mag in the States today" in terms of "covering music from anywhere but the mainstream", and The Washington Post called it the "best" for "a broader spectrum of contemporary music". In 1989, the magazine had subscribers in 26 countries outside the United States. The advertising section was largely dedicated to small record labels; in 1997, Becker stated that advertising remained affordable to such companies due to the magazine keeping to a small circulation (27000 at the time).

1995 saw a graphical re-design of the magazine, focused mainly on improving readability. The logo typeface was changed to Frutiger, interior text was limited to Garamond and Triplex from the more eclectic mixture used previously, and the subtitle became instead Music Culture. These changes took place in the 10th anniversary issue (March/April 1995). On the elimination of the "alternatives" tag, Becker commented, in that issue's editorial and elsewhere, that "alternative" had been reduced to a "marketing platform" in culture and the media, becoming "watered down": "The sense that 'alternative' means 'other' - or 'all' - music is lost."

In July 1998, Becker announced that Option would go on hiatus, in order to consider the issues of finances and online competition; however, the July/August issue proved to be its last. The Los Angeles Times later attributed the end of the magazine to a mid-1990s jump in the price of paper, which the size of the publication could not accommodate for.

On March 1, 2010, 1990s-era Option editor Mark Kemp – with support and encouragement from Becker – assembled a new Option team rounded out by media director Herman Marin and his brother, art director Juan Miguel Marin. The web-only publication soft-launched in December with a Kemp-penned review of the Girl Talk album All Day and his report from Morocco's Fez Festival of World Sacred Music. The new Option used earlier name writers such as Neil Strauss, Stanley Booth and Karen Schomer as well as younger newcomers, and included interactive sections inviting users to participate in the musical and cultural dialog. After three homepage "cover" stories – Yo La Tengo, Girl Talk and Steve Earle – it, too, went on hiatus when Kemp returned as editor in chief of Creative Loafing Charlotte in September 2011.

== Features ==
=== Covers ===
Early issues of Option were numbered alphabetically: as the twenty-six issues of OP were numbered A-Z, Option was published starting from issue #A2 (A-Squared). Issue #S2 (S-Squared) (March/April 1988) ended this system, and subsequent issues were numbered from #20 onwards. The pro-active rationale at the time, as OPtion was approaching the end of the squared alphabet, was to eliminate repeating the original OP alphabet yet again, and thus avoid cubed letters. In addition, just as OP used the letter of each issue as a theme, selecting musicians and topics named beginning with that issue's letter, early lettered issues of Option also carried on this practice. Very early covers emphasized the connection to OP magazine by capitalizing the first two letters of OPtion.

Artists who have appeared multiple times on the cover of Option include Brian Eno, on #E2 (E-Squared) (November/December 1985) and #37 (March/April 1991); Sonic Youth, on #G2 (G-Squared) (March/April 1986) and #79 (March/April 1998); and Meat Puppets, on #R2 (R-Squared) (January/February 1988) and #64 (September/October 1995). Issue #64 also featured a non-music headline banner, covering the death of Cesar Rene Arce.

The cover of the final issue, #81, featured Elliott Smith.

=== Subscription incentives ===
In the mid-1990s, Option included various record label sampler CDs with subscriptions. These included Particle Theory: A Compendium of Lightspeed Incursions and Semiotic Weapons From Warner/Reprise (Reprise Records, 1993) and No Balls (4AD, 1995).

== Staff ==
Scott Becker was Option's owner and publisher for its entire history from the mid-1980s until 1998. He created a world-class, innovative, music magazine that quickly became a distinguished icon within both the counter-culture and mainstream rock music worlds. Unlike most other publishers, Becker saw his magazine as a complex organism, a work of graphic art, music, thought, and underground mass communication for the "true" indy music scene. Shunning personal publicity, he gradually became more and more involved in his own personal and spiritual evolution, resisting the growing effects of the internet upon the music magazine business. Becker finally pulled the plug on Option in 1998 as the alternative publishing and indy music markets both began to falter drastically, no longer being the truly independent scenes they were when he first started the magazine in the 1980s. Following Option's closure, Becker has since become a full-time artist.

Richie Unterberger served as editor from 1985 to mid-1991, and subsequently became a major contributor to Allmusic.

Mark Kemp succeeded Unterberger as editor from 1991 to 1996, when he was hired by Rolling Stone as an editor. His successor, Jason Fine, was also hired by Rolling Stone a year later, and remains there to date.

Steve Appleford followed Jason Fine for most of 1997. Becker then edited the final two issues of the magazine himself with the assistance of senior editor Erik Pedersen.

Kristin Bell was Option's art director from its inception as a Xeroxed sheet in the late 1980s through its coming of age in the mid-1990s, creating the incredible style, avant-garde layouts, photography and edgy feel for which the magazine became famed. In 1989 Barry Walker took over as art director for issues 24-28. It was in July 1989 that the Washington Post writer Richard Harrington called the magazine "well-designed" when reviewing issue 27 alongside other music publications. While at Option Bell was at the very forefront of the then industry-wide shift away from manual compositing to Apple-based digital layouts, her groundbreaking digital compositing playing a great role in the magazine's fresh look, growth and success. Prior to Option, she served as art director of Los Angeles–based Rock Magazine in the mid-1980s. After leaving Option in 1995, she subsequently became co-producer of Lee Lew-Lee's multi-award-winning documentary on the 1960s US civil rights movement, All Power to the People, which was broadcast in 24 nations, as one of the few globally watched and acclaimed documentaries on the subject. She now serves as consultant to SFDM, INC., a high-performance super-computing company, specializing in rich media, 3D modeling, HDTV and 3D film rendering, as well as "petaflop scale" scientific R&D and HPC. After leaving Option, Barry Walker worked at Surfing magazine and was later art director of both Bodyboarding and Volleyball magazines, all published by Western Empire Publications in San Clemente, California.

Barbara "Bix" Jordan served as Option's Assistant Editor from the late 1980s until early '90s.

== Spin-offs ==
An issue of UHF magazine.

=== UHF ===
In January 1995, Sonic Options Network launched UHF (Ultra High Frequency), an alternative fashion magazine, after including it in Option itself as a supplement for two issues, starting in June 1994. The magazine targeted ages ranging from teens to 20s, focusing on concerns such as affordability; early issues were distributed at Urban Outfitters outlets. Later, in 1997, Becker characterized the launch as a failure.

=== Option.FM ===
Option.FM was an electronic dance music compilation album released in conjunction with Moonshine Records in 1998. Tracks were selected by Moonshine president Steve Levy and Becker, who wrote the liner notes to the album. A second volume, planned to be released within the year, never materialized.

1. "Westway" – Dub Pistols
2. "I Am the Freshmaka" – The Freshmaka
3. "We All Want to Be Free" (Skull Valley dub) – Tranquility Bass
4. "Why?" (DJ Vadim remix) – Gus Gus
5. "You Don't Get Me" (Urban Takeover mix) – Espiritu
6. "Frequency 019" – Snow
7. "Children of Summer" – Color Filter
8. "Ballet Mechanique" – DJ Spooky with Burro Banton
9. "Banano's Bar" – Plastilina Mosh
10. "Halfway Around the World" – Thievery Corporation
11. "Billy Club" (original) – Junkie XL
12. "Madness" (DJ Dara remix) – Keoki
13. "Neon Ray" – Lunatic Calm
