= Deathrock =

Rock music subgenre

- Other names: Horror rock
- Stylistic origins: Punk rock; horror film score; glam rock
- Cultural origins: Early 1980s, Los Angeles, US

Other topics
- List of deathrock bands; horror punk; gothabilly; punk rock in California

Deathrock (or death rock) is a subgenre of rock music that merges punk rock with gothic and glam rock visuals, alongside elements of horror film scores. Often overlapping with, and sometimes considered a subgenre of, gothic rock, the genre was pioneered by bands from the early 1980s Los Angeles punk scene, including Christian Death, Kommunity FK, 45 Grave and the Super Heroines.

By the middle of the decade, the genre had begun to interact with the United Kingdom's gothic rock scene, leading to the formation of English deathrock bands like Sex Gang Children and Alien Sex Fiend though the scene quickly declined and its name largely fell out of use. By the late 1990s, a revival of the genre began with groups like Bloody Dead and Sexy, the Phantom Limbs and Tragic Black expanding the scope of the genre to include elements of psychobilly, electronic body music and futurepop.

== Characteristics ==
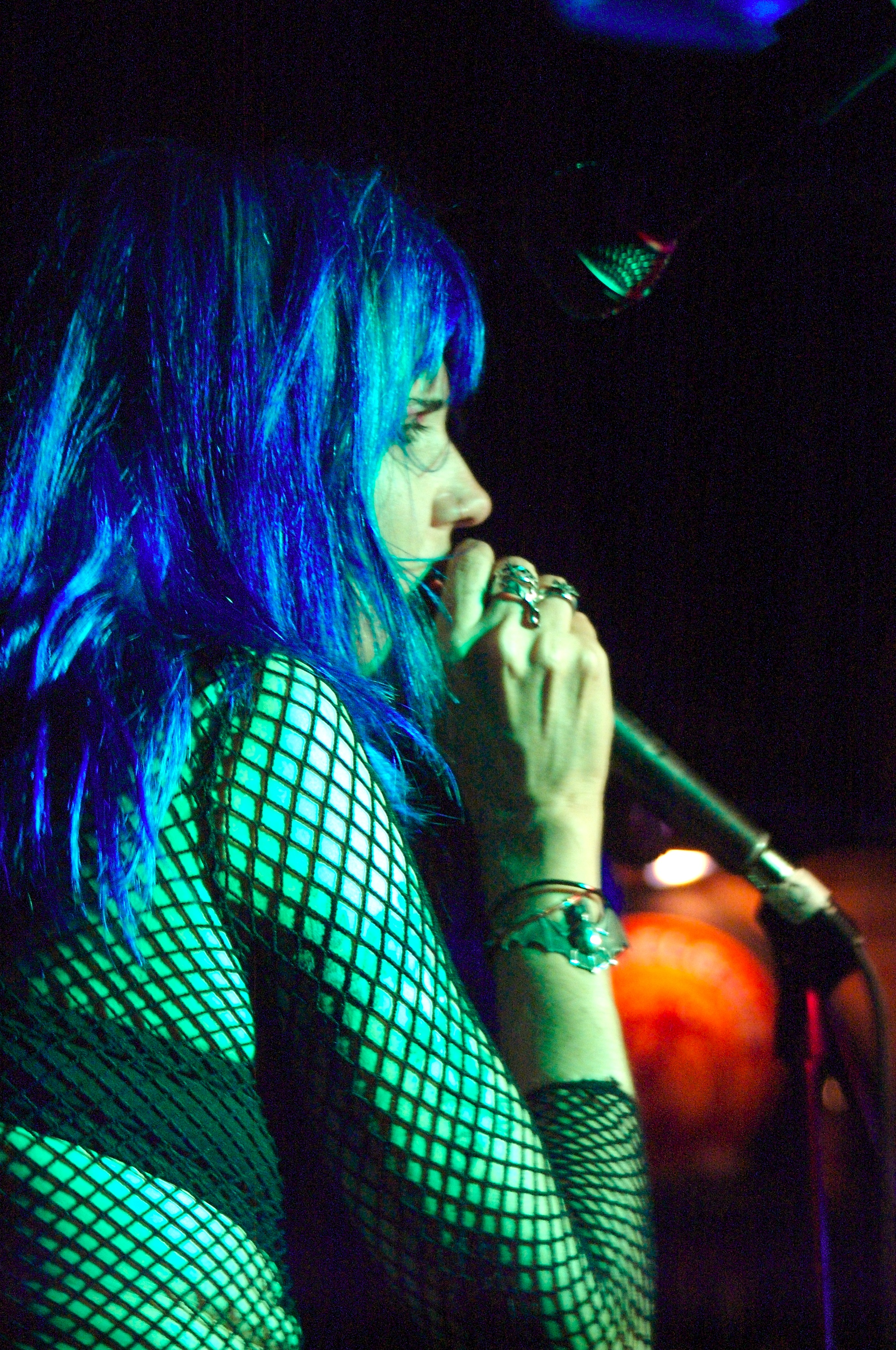
45 Grave vocalist Dinah Cancer in 2007

Deathrock songs usually incorporate a driving, repetitive rhythm section; the drums and bass guitar laying the foundation within a 4/4 time signature while the guitars either play simple chords or effects-driven leads to create atmosphere. Chorus effects, such as those produced by the Boss CE-2 pedal, are commonly used by deathrock guitarists to create a wider and more haunting tone. The use of lyrics can vary, but are typically introspective and surreal, and deal with the dark themes of isolation, gloom, disillusionment, loss, life, death, etc.; as can the style, varying from harsh and dark to upbeat, melodic, and tongue-in-cheek. Deathrock lyrics and other musical stylistic elements often incorporate the themes of campy horror and sci-fi films. Despite the similar-sounding name, deathrock has no connection to death metal, which is a subgenre of heavy metal.

== Etymology ==
The term "deathrock" was first used in the 1950s to describe a thematically related genre of rock and roll, which began in 1958 with Jody Reynolds' "Endless Sleep" and ended in 1964 with J. Frank Wilson's "Last Kiss". The term was also applied to the Shangri-Las' "Leader of the Pack". These songs about dead teenagers were noted for their morbid yet romantic view of death, spoken word bridges, and sound effects. In 1974, the term "deathrock" was used by Gene Grier to describe the same phenomenon in rock music. The term later re-emerged to describe the sound of various West Coast punk bands.

The re-emergence of the term "deathrock" during the early 1980s most likely came from one of three sources: Rozz Williams, the founding member of Christian Death, to describe the sound of his band; the music press, reusing the 1950s term to describe an emerging subgenre of punk; and/or Nick Zedd's 1979 film They Eat Scum, which featured a fictitious cannibalistic "deathrock" punk band called "Suzy Putrid and the Mental Deficients."

== History ==
=== 1950s–1970s: Forerunners ===
The earliest influences for some deathrock acts can be traced to the horror-themed novelty rock and roll acts of the late 1950s and early 1960s such as Bobby "Boris" Pickett and the Crypt-Kickers and Zacherle with "Monster Mash"; Screamin' Jay Hawkins with "I Put a Spell on You"; Screaming Lord Sutch & the Savages with "Murder in the Graveyard"; and Don Hinson and the Rigormorticians with "Riboflavin-Flavored Non-Carbonated Poly-Unsaturated Blood".

Other influences included the Doors, David Bowie, Alice Cooper, the Cramps, Black Sabbath and the Damned. Subsequently, the 1979 single "Bela Lugosi's Dead" by British post-punk group Bauhaus was one of the major influences amongst the early deathrock scene. Additionally, Roky Erickson coined the term "horror rock" in 1980, when describing the music of his band Roky Erickson and the Aliens, the term would later be used to describe the early deathrock scene in L.A.

=== Late 1970s–1980s: Origins ===
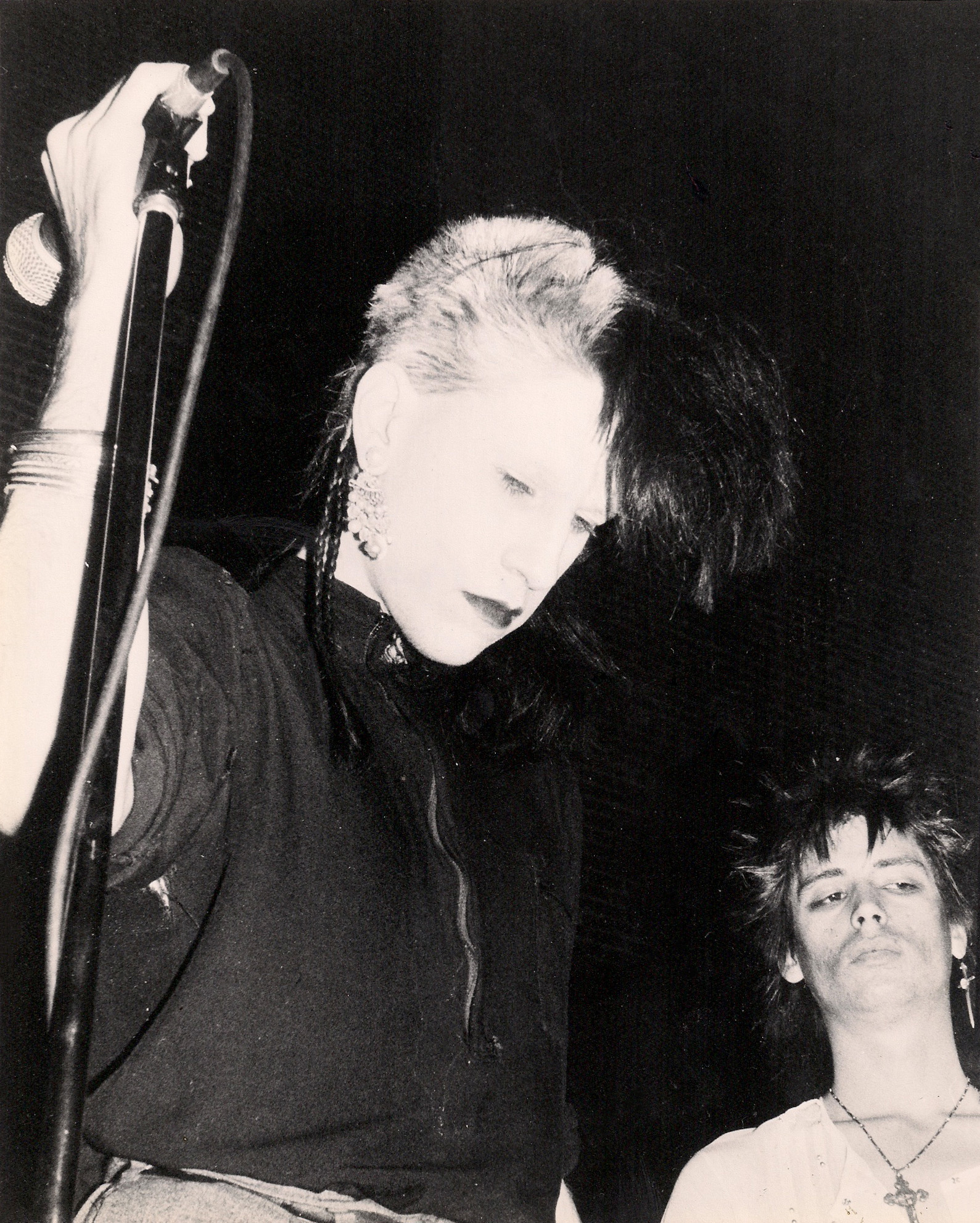
Christian Death members Rozz Williams and Johnnie Sage performing in 1983

During the late 1970s, the Los Angeles punk rock scene emerged, with bands like the Gun Club and the Flesh Eaters grim take on punk becoming a notable precursor to deathrock. Furthermore, T.S.O.L. were a defining group in the scene who briefly embraced gothic and deathrock elements. By the early 1980s, deathrock emerged as an offshoot of the Los Angeles punk rock scene, differentiating itself through its greater emphasis on horror. In 1983, music journalists Peter Belsito and Bob Davis released the book Hardcore California: A History of Punk and New Wave, referring to deathrock as a "horror-rock" scene that emerged in L.A. during the late 1970s to early 1980s, stating ,"Horror Rock brought some much needed bands out of the woodwork, such as the Cramps [...] and the re-formed Flesheaters," followed by referring to deathrock bands such as Voodoo Church and Christian Death as "horror-rock".

According to a 2006 article by Stylus Magazine, one popular theory as to the reason for this split was the 1980 suicide of Germs vocalist Darby Crash. According to this interpretation, Crash's death led to a period of mourning amongst many of those in the scene and eventually to a fascination with the macabre. Nonetheless, amongst this splinter bands began to form merging the sounds of Los Angeles punk rock with these darker elements to create deathrock. The most prominent of these groups were Christian Death, 45 Grave, Super Heroines and Kommunity FK. Tracks by several of these acts were featured on 1981's Hell Comes to Your House compilation LP, which represented an early attempt to collect and promote local artists on the cutting edge of this new, darker version of L.A. punk. The bands generally performed and congregated at the Anti-Club, a club night in Hollywood that would change venues every few weeks; the O.N. Klub, located in Silver Lake, also frequently hosted deathrock acts throughout the genre's early period. Outside of this scene, Theatre of Ice from Fallon, Nevada independently created a sound which some sources have considered as pioneering deathrock.

During this time, deathrock bands often performed alongside both hardcore punk and new wave bands. However, deathrock bands were not generally viewed as their own distinct genre, instead being seen as darker punk bands or sometimes even conflated with horror punk.

By the early 1980s, the United States' deathrock scene became increasingly connected to the United Kingdom's gothic rock scene, a genre which journalist James Greene described as "very much in line" with deathrock. This cross-pollination was particularly influenced by the Gun Club's European tour in 1983, and Christian Death's tour in 1984. Subsequently, Christian Death departed from their early deathrock sound in favour of the gothic rock of Catastrophe Ballet, while the sound of deathrock had begun to be embraced by English bands including Sex Gang Children and Alien Sex Fiend.

The band Rudimentary Peni are described by Brooklyn Vegan as anarcho-punk/deathrock; Invisible Oranges characterised the sound of band Part 1 as goth/deathrock mixed with anarcho-punk. By the time that the Sisters of Mercy gained widespread success in the scene, the term "deathrock" had predominantly fallen out of use and the style was viewed as simply a subgenre of gothic rock.

=== 1990s–2020s: Revival ===
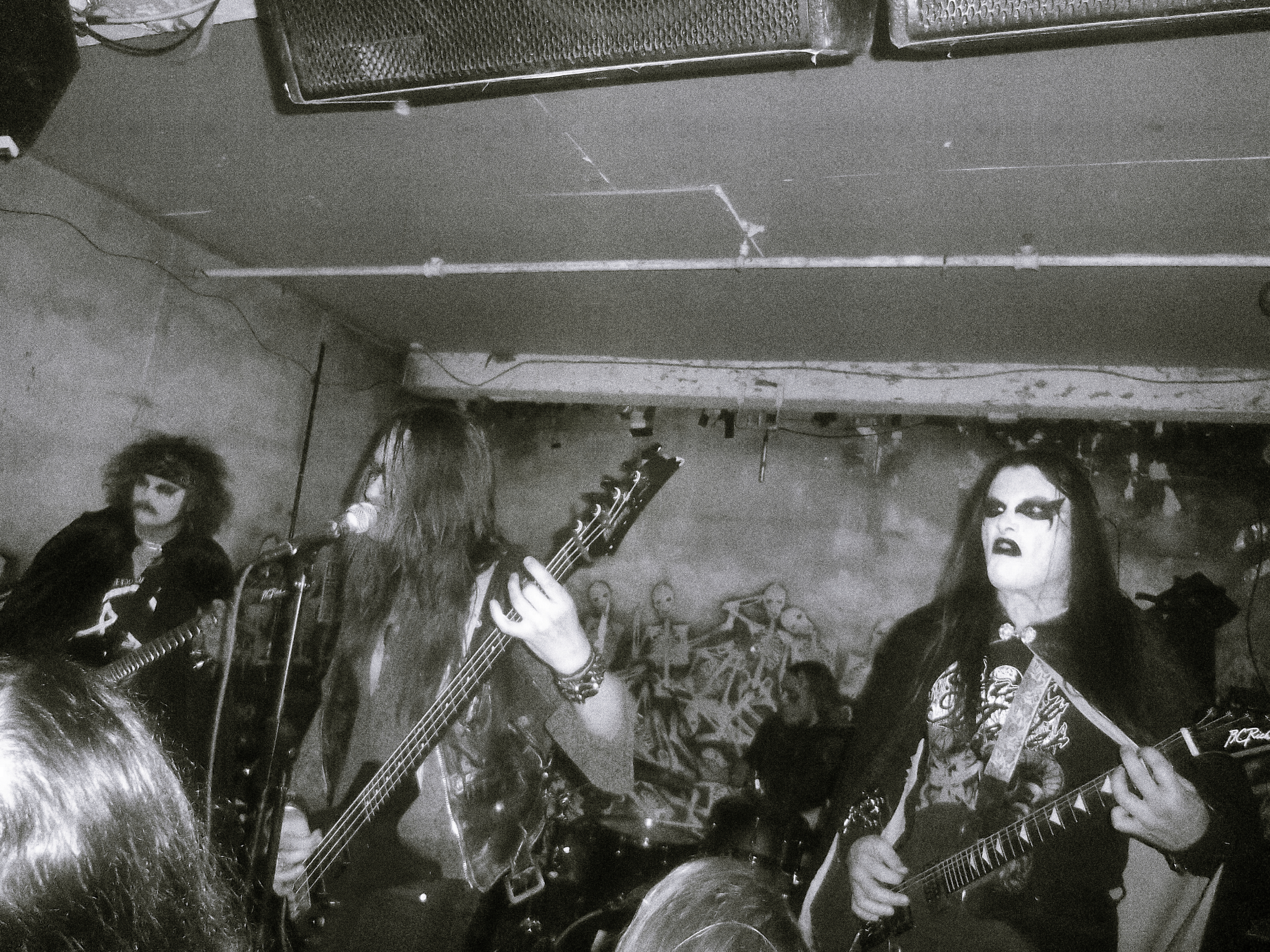
Devil Master, a contemporary band who merge elements of deathrock and black metal

The mid-1990s marked a third wave of gothic rock, as the music drifted its furthest from the original punk and post-punk sound by incorporating many elements of the industrial music scene at the time (which itself had moved away from experimental noise and into a more dance-rock oriented sound) and the more repetitive and electronic sounds of electronic body music. Some clubs have even entirely removed deathrock and first-generation gothic rock from their setlists.

Halloween 1998 saw the launch of Release the Bats, a monthly goth and deathrock club night in Long Beach, California. During its run time it became southern California's most frequented goth night and Long Beach's longest running club night, launching the careers of deathrock bands like Mephisto Walz. The success of the club caused many other deathrock club nights to be established in the following years. This, along with the rise of online music piracy led to the increased popularity of older deathrock bands and establishment of new, international deathrock groups, like Bloody Dead and Sexy, commencing the first deathrock revival. During this period groups like the Phantom Limbs and Black Ice began to merge deathrock with elements of no wave and synthpunk. Many groups from this period, most notably Tragic Black, began to make use of an aesthetic heavily inspired by Batcave fashion. This era was mostly based online, through websites including deathrock.com, post-punk.com, MySpace and LiveJournal. Furthermore, it embraced a broader spectrum of influences, including psychobilly, electronic body music and futurepop.

During the 2010s, deathrock's influence was revived, in the form of the dark punk and G-beat styles. In these genres, bands including Deathcharge, Cemetery, Lost Tribe and Christ vs Warhol, merged deathrock into hardcore punk and D-beat templates. Furthermore, during this time, bands such as Devil Master emerged, who merge the genre with black metal, and Gatecreeper who incorporate the genre's influence into death metal.

== See also ==
- List of deathrock bands
- Gothabilly
- Dark cabaret
