= Mascara and Monsters: The Best of Alice Cooper =

Greatest hits album by Alice Cooper
- Released: January 16, 2001
- Recorded: 1970–1989
- Genre: Hard rock; heavy metal
- Length: 76:44
- Label: Rhino
- Producer: Varies

Alice Cooper chronology
| Brutal Planet (2000) | Mascara and Monsters: The Best of Alice Cooper (2001) | The Definitive Alice Cooper (2001) |

Professional ratings
Review scores
| Source | Rating |
|---|---|
| AllMusic | 5/5 stars |
| The Rolling Stone Album Guide | 4/5 stars |

Mascara and Monsters: The Best of Alice Cooper is a compilation album by rock singer Alice Cooper, released by Warner Archives/Rhino in 2001 in the United States only. Its worldwide companion release is The Definitive Alice Cooper compilation album, which has a slightly different track listing and different packaging, though both compilations feature the same back cover, tray insert and disc image. The album features material from his solo career and from his tenure with the Alice Cooper band; however, like the 1974 Greatest Hits compilation, material from Pretties for You and Easy Action is not present on Mascara and Monsters.

The album cover features Cooper in the mid-1970s looking at his mascara-eyed monstrous alter-ego.

== Track listing ==
| No. | Title | Original album (year) | Length |
|---|---|---|---|
| 1. | "I'm Eighteen" | Love It to Death (1971) | 3:00 |
| 2. | "Is It My Body" | Love It to Death | 2:39 |
| 3. | "Desperado" | Killer (1971) | 3:26 |
| 4. | "Under My Wheels" | Killer | 2:48 |
| 5. | "Be My Lover" | Killer | 3:22 |
| 6. | "School's Out" (single version) | School's Out (1972) | 3:29 |
| 7. | "Elected" (single version) | Billion Dollar Babies (1973) | 4:08 |
| 8. | "Hello Hooray" (single version) | Billion Dollar Babies | 3:01 |
| 9. | "Generation Landslide" | Billion Dollar Babies | 4:31 |
| 10. | "No More Mr. Nice Guy" | Billion Dollar Babies | 3:07 |
| 11. | "Billion Dollar Babies" | Billion Dollar Babies | 3:42 |
| 12. | "Teenage Lament '74" | Muscle of Love (1973) | 3:52 |
| 13. | "Muscle of Love" | Muscle of Love | 3:45 |
| 14. | "Only Women Bleed" (single version) | Welcome to My Nightmare (1975) | 3:30 |
| 15. | "Department of Youth" | Welcome to My Nightmare | 3:20 |
| 16. | "Welcome to My Nightmare" (single version) | Welcome to My Nightmare | 2:48 |
| 17. | "I Never Cry" | Alice Cooper Goes to Hell (1976) | 3:44 |
| 18. | "You and Me" (single version) | Lace and Whiskey (1977) | 3:25 |
| 19. | "How You Gonna See Me Now" | From the Inside (1978) | 3:55 |
| 20. | "From the Inside" (single version) | From the Inside | 3:31 |
| 21. | "Clones (We're All)" (single version) | Flush the Fashion (1980) | 2:53 |
| 22. | "Poison" | Trash (1989) | 4:30 |
