= Greatest Hits (Alice Cooper album) =

Alice Cooper's Greatest Hits

Greatest hits album by Alice Cooper
- Released: August 1974
- Recorded: 1970–73
- Genre: Hard rock
- Length: 41:41
- Label: Warner Bros.
- Producers: Jack Richardson, Jack Douglas, Bob Ezrin

Alice Cooper chronology
Muscle of Love (1973)	Alice Cooper's Greatest Hits (1974)	Welcome to My Nightmare (1975)

Singles from Greatest Hits
- 1. "I'm Eighteen" Released: August 1974

Alice Cooper's Greatest Hits is the only greatest hits album by American rock band Alice Cooper, and their last release as a band until the release of their 2025 comeback album The Revenge of Alice Cooper. Released in August 1974, it features hit songs from five of the band's seven studio albums. It does not include any material from their first two albums, Pretties for You and Easy Action.

This compilation's song versions were remixed by Jack Richardson at the time, with the remix of "I'm Eighteen" being released as a single in the US. The reason behind remixing the songs was perhaps to boost its appeal as "new" versions because no new tracks were available for inclusion by the group as they were on hiatus at the time.

This compilation was expanded upon when, in 2001, Rhino released Mascara & Monsters: The Best of Alice Cooper, which includes the original single versions of the songs in addition to a number of Cooper's post-1974 hits as a solo artist, filling up the entire CD. The liner notes of this compilation also include a then-complete album discography spanning from 1969 to 2000.

== Artwork ==
The album's cover art was designed by Ernie Cefalu and features a sepia-toned Drew Struzan illustration of the band members in front of a 1930s garage, accompanied by such period movie stars as Humphrey Bogart, Clark Gable, Robert Taylor, Edward G. Robinson, Jean Harlow, Peter Lorre, and Groucho Marx. The inner sleeve features a similar illustration of the band surrounded by these and other stars of Hollywood's golden age such as Marilyn Monroe, Gary Cooper, Judy Garland, Errol Flynn, Clara Bow, Boris Karloff, Zasu Pitts, Tyrone Power, Bela Lugosi, Marlene Dietrich, Tallulah Bankhead, Betty Grable, Veronica Lake and Alan Ladd. A depiction of the St. Valentine's Day Massacre is in the upper middle. The album was released by Friday Music records on vinyl in 2013 with a Gatefold cover, mimicking the 1974 Australian release of the album, which was the only territory where it was originally released with a Gatefold sleeve.

Professional ratings
Review scores
Source	Rating
AllMusic	5/5 stars
Christgau's Record Guide	A−
The Rolling Stone Album Guide	4.5/5 stars

== Track listing ==
Side one

1. "I'm Eighteen" (Alice Cooper, Glen Buxton, Michael Bruce, Dennis Dunaway, Neal Smith) – 2:58
  - Original version on Love It to Death
2. "Is It My Body" (Cooper, Buxton, Bruce, Dunaway, Smith) – 2:41
  - Original version on Love It to Death
3. "Desperado" (Cooper, Bruce) – 3:29
  - Original version on Killer
4. "Under My Wheels" (Bruce, Dunaway, Bob Ezrin) – 2:46
  - *Original version on Killer
5. "Be My Lover" (Bruce) – 3:22
  - *Original version on Killer
6. "School's Out" (Cooper, Buxton, Bruce, Dunaway, Smith) – 3:30
  - Original version on School's Out

Side two

1. "Hello Hooray" (Rolf Kempf) – 4:18
  - Original version on Billion Dollar Babies
2. "Elected" (Cooper, Buxton, Bruce, Dunaway, Smith) – 4:08
  - Original version on Billion Dollar Babies
3. "No More Mr. Nice Guy" (Cooper, Bruce) – 3:07
  - Original version on Billion Dollar Babies
4. "Billion Dollar Babies" (Cooper, Bruce, Smith) – 3:43
  - Original version on Billion Dollar Babies
5. "Teenage Lament '74" (Cooper, Smith) – 3:54
  - Original version on Muscle of Love
6. "Muscle of Love" (Cooper, Bruce) – 3:45
  - Original version on Muscle of Love

== Personnel ==
Alice Cooper Band

- Alice Cooper – vocals, harmonica
- Glen Buxton – lead guitar
- Michael Bruce – rhythm guitar, keyboards, backing vocals
- Dennis Dunaway – bass guitar, backing vocals
- Neal Smith – drums, backing vocals

with:

- Steve Hunter – guitar solos on "Billion Dollar Babies" and "Hello Hooray"

== Charts & certifications ==
=== Weekly charts ===
Chart (1974)	Peak position
Australian (Kent Music Report)	71
Canada Top Albums/CDs (RPM)	8
US Billboard 200	8

=== Year-end charts ===
Chart (1974)	Position
Canada Top Albums/CDs (RPM)	57

=== Certifications ===
Region	Certification	Certified units/sales
Canada (Music Canada)	3× Platinum	300,000^{^}
United States (RIAA)	Platinum	1,000,000^{^}
^{^} Shipments figures based on certification alone.
