= Halo of Flies (song) =

Single by Alice Cooper

from the album Killer
- B-side: "Under My Wheels"
- Released: June 1973
- Genre: Hard rock; progressive rock; psychedelic rock
- Length: 8:21
- Label: Warner Bros.
- Songwriter(s): Alice Cooper, Glen Buxton, Michael Bruce, Dennis Dunaway, Neal Smith
- Producer(s): Bob Ezrin

Alice Cooper singles chronology
"Billion Dollar Babies" (1973)	"Halo of Flies" (1973)	"Teenage Lament '74" (1973)

"Halo of Flies" is a 1973 single by rock band Alice Cooper taken from their 1971 album Killer. The single was only released in the Netherlands, two years after the song appeared on the album. The song was, according to Cooper's liner notes in the compilation The Definitive Alice Cooper, an attempt by the band to prove that they could perform King Crimson-like progressive rock suites, and was supposedly about a spy organization.

Upon its 1973 single release, the song became a top 10 hit in the Netherlands and also charted in neighboring Belgium because of imports. The single release featured the B-side "Under My Wheels", also from the Killer album, which had already been released as a single two years prior.

The noise rock band Halo of Flies named themselves after this song. Jello Biafra and The Melvins covered the song on their release Sieg Howdy!, while Haunted Garage covered it for the 1993 Cooper tribute Welcome to Our Nightmare. The song was also used in the VR experience Dreams of Dali.

This song was performed live by Tripping Daisy Aug 27, 2022 at the Kessler Theatre as part of a Homage Nation tribute to the Alice Cooper band.

== Track listing ==
1. "Halo of Flies" (Alice Cooper, Glen Buxton, Michael Bruce, Dennis Dunaway, Neal Smith) - 8:21
2. "Under My Wheels" (Michael Bruce, Dennis Dunaway, Bob Ezrin) - 2:51

== Personnel ==
- Alice Cooper - vocals
- Glen Buxton - lead guitar
- Michael Bruce - rhythm guitar, keyboards
- Dennis Dunaway - bass guitar
- Neal Smith - drums

== Charts ==
Year	Chart	Peak Chart Position
1973	Dutch Singles Chart	5
1973	Belgian (Flemish) Singles Chart	15
