= Paranormal (Alice Cooper album) =

Studio album by Alice Cooper
- Released: July 28, 2017
- Genre: Hard rock
- Length: 34:11
- Label: earMusic
- Producer: Bob Ezrin; Tommy Henriksen; Tommy Denander

Alice Cooper chronology
Welcome 2 My Nightmare (2011)	Paranormal (2017)	Live from the Astroturf (2018)

Singles from Paranormal
- 1. "Paranoic Personality" Released: June 7, 2017; 2. "Paranormal" Released: July 14, 2017; 3. "The Sound of A" Released: February 23, 2018

Professional ratings
Aggregate scores
Source	Rating
Metacritic	72/100
Review scores
Source	Rating
AllMusic	3.5/5 stars
Blabbermouth.net	8/10 stars
Rolling Stone	3.5/5 stars

Paranormal is the twentieth solo and twenty-seventh overall studio album by American rock singer Alice Cooper, released on July 28, 2017. It features three tracks performed by the original line-up of the Alice Cooper band (Neal Smith, Dennis Dunaway, and Michael Bruce, without Glen Buxton, who died in 1997) plus Larry Mullen Jr. from U2, Roger Glover from Deep Purple, Billy Gibbons from ZZ Top, Swedish songwriter and session guitarist Tommy Denander, Alice Cooper bandmate Tommy Henriksen, Steve Hunter. "Holy Water" is a cover of the Villebillies song.

== Track listing ==
No.	Title	Writer(s)	Length
1.	"Paranormal"	Alice Cooper, Tommy Denander, Roger Glover, Bob Ezrin	4:11
2.	"Dead Flies"	Cooper, Denander, Ezrin	2:22
3.	"Fireball"	Dennis Dunaway, Cooper	4:49
4.	"Paranoiac Personality"	Cooper, Denander, Ezrin, Tommy Henriksen	3:12
5.	"Fallen in Love"	Cooper, Denander, Ezrin, Henriksen	3:34
6.	"Dynamite Road"	Cooper, Denander, Ezrin	2:43
7.	"Private Public Breakdown"	Cooper, Parker Gispert, Ezrin	3:26
8.	"Holy Water"	Cooper, Stanley Demaree, Duston Monyhan, Tim Bernauer, Malcolm McLaughlin, Lewis Richards, Ezrin	3:08
9.	"Rats"	Cooper, Henriksen, Ezrin	2:39
10.	"The Sound of A"	Cooper, Dunaway	4:07

Bonus tracks (with members of original Alice Cooper band)
No.	Title	Writer(s)	Length
11.	"Genuine American Girl"	Cooper, Neal Smith, Ezrin	4:27
12.	"You and All of Your Friends"	Cooper, Dunaway, Ezrin	2:41

Bonus tracks (live in Columbus, Ohio, May 6, 2016, with current Alice Cooper band)
No.	Title	Writer(s)	Length
13.	"No More Mr. Nice Guy"	Alice Cooper, Michael Bruce	3:10
14.	"Under My Wheels"	Bruce, Dennis Dunaway, Bob Ezrin	2:56
15.	"Billion Dollar Babies"	Cooper, Bruce, Reggie Vinson	3:38
16.	"Feed My Frankenstein"	Mark Manning, Ian Richardson, Nick Coler, Cooper	5:01
17.	"Only Women Bleed"	Cooper, Dick Wagner	5:08
18.	"School's Out"	Cooper, Glen Buxton, Bruce, Dunaway, Neal Smith	6:06

== Personnel ==
=== Studio album ===
- Alice Cooper – vocals (all tracks), backing vocals (track 7)
- Tommy Denander – guitar (all tracks), co producer
- Tommy Henriksen – guitar (all tracks), backing vocals (all tracks), percussion (tracks 4, 6, and 9), sound effects (track 4, 6, 9, and 10), keyboards (track 9), co producer
- Larry Mullen Jr. – drums (tracks 1–8, and 10)
- Bob Ezrin – production, keyboards (tracks 1 and 9), organ (tracks 3 and 10), sound effects (tracks 4), backing vocals (track 7)
- Roger Glover – bass (track 1)
- Billy Gibbons – guitar (track 5)
- Jimmie Lee Sloas – bass (tracks 2, and 4–8)
- Dennis Dunaway – bass (tracks 3, 9 and 10)
- Parker Gispert – guitar (track 7), backing vocals (track 7)
- Steve Hunter – lead guitar (track 8, 11 and 12)
- Demi Demaree – backing vocals (tracks 8 and 10)
- Johnny Reid – backing vocals (tracks 8 and 10)
- Jeremy Rubolino – horns (track 8)
- Adrian Olmos – horns (track 8)
- Chris Traynor – horns (tracks 8)
- Michael Bruce – guitar (track 9)
- Neal Smith – drums (track 9)
- Nick Didkovsky – guitar (tracks 3 and 10)

=== Bonus tracks with original members ===
- Michael Bruce – guitar (both tracks)
- Neal Smith – drums (both tracks)
- Dennis Dunaway – bass (both tracks)
- Steve Hunter – guitar (track 11), lead guitar (track 12)
- Bob Ezrin – keyboards (track 11), backing vocals (track 11)
- Tommy Denander – guitar (both tracks)
- Nick Didkovsky – guitar (track 12)
- Tommy Henriksen – backing vocals (track 12)

=== Bonus tracks live in Columbus ===
- Chuck Garric – bass, backing vocals
- Nita Strauss – guitar, backing vocals
- Glen Sobel – drums
- Tommy Henriksen – guitar, backing vocals
- Ryan Roxie – guitar, backing vocals

== Charts ==
Chart (2017)	Peak position
Australian Albums (ARIA)	4
Austrian Albums (Ö3 Austria)	8
Belgian Albums (Ultratop Flanders)	15
Belgian Albums (Ultratop Wallonia)	5
Canadian Albums (Billboard)	17
Czech Albums (ČNS IFPI)	7
Dutch Albums (Album Top 100)	24
Finnish Albums (Suomen virallinen lista)	9
French Albums (SNEP)	57
German Albums (Offizielle Top 100)	4
Hungarian Albums (MAHASZ)	10
Italian Albums (FIMI)	47
Japanese Albums (Oricon)	186
New Zealand Albums (RMNZ)	33
Norwegian Albums (VG-lista)	15
Scottish Albums (Official Charts)	3
Spanish Albums (PROMUSICAE)	31
Swedish Albums (Sverigetopplistan)	6
Swiss Albums (Schweizer Hitparade)	3
UK Albums (Official Charts)	6
UK Rock & Metal Albums (Official Charts)	1
US Billboard 200	32
US Independent Albums (Billboard)	1
US Top Hard Rock Albums (Billboard)	1
US Top Rock Albums (Billboard)	6
