= Be My Lover (Alice Cooper song) =

Single by Alice Cooper

from the album Killer
- B-side: "Yeah, Yeah, Yeah" (US) "You Drive Me Nervous" (UK)
- Released: February 1972
- Genre: Glam rock
- Length: 3:15
- Label: Warner Bros.
- Songwriter: Michael Bruce
- Producer: Bob Ezrin

Alice Cooper singles chronology
"Under My Wheels" (1971)	"Be My Lover" (1972)	"School's Out" (1972)

"Be My Lover" is a song by American rock band Alice Cooper, released in 1972 as the second single from their fourth album Killer. The song was written by guitarist Michael Bruce and produced by Bob Ezrin.

The song's lyrics are semi-autobiographical, coming from the perspective of a musician trying to seduce a woman and telling her what he does for a living ("I told her that I came from Detroit city / and I played guitar in a long-haired rock and roll band"). The musician recalls that the woman "asked me why the singer’s name was Alice." The song reached No. 49 on the Billboard Hot 100 singles chart, remaining on the chart for ten weeks.

Record World called it Alice Cooper's "best single since "Eighteen". Cash Box called it an "autobiographical groupie tune [that] should outdistance 'Under My Wheels' and hit on the order of their 'Eighteen.'"

== Releases on albums ==
- Killer – 1971
- The Whole Burbank Catalog – 1972 (Warner Bros./Reprise sampler LP)
- Alice Cooper's Greatest Hits – 1974
- The Beast of Alice Cooper – 1989
- The Life and Crimes of Alice Cooper – 1999
- Mascara & Monsters: The Best of Alice Cooper – 2001
- The Essentials – Alice Cooper – 2002
- School's Out and Other Hits – 2004

== Cover versions ==
The following artists have covered "Be My Lover":

- Mojo Nixon and Skid Roper (1986)
- Joan Jett & the Blackhearts (1993)
- Scream featuring Sim Cain (2010)
