= Alice Cooper =

American rock singer (born 1948)

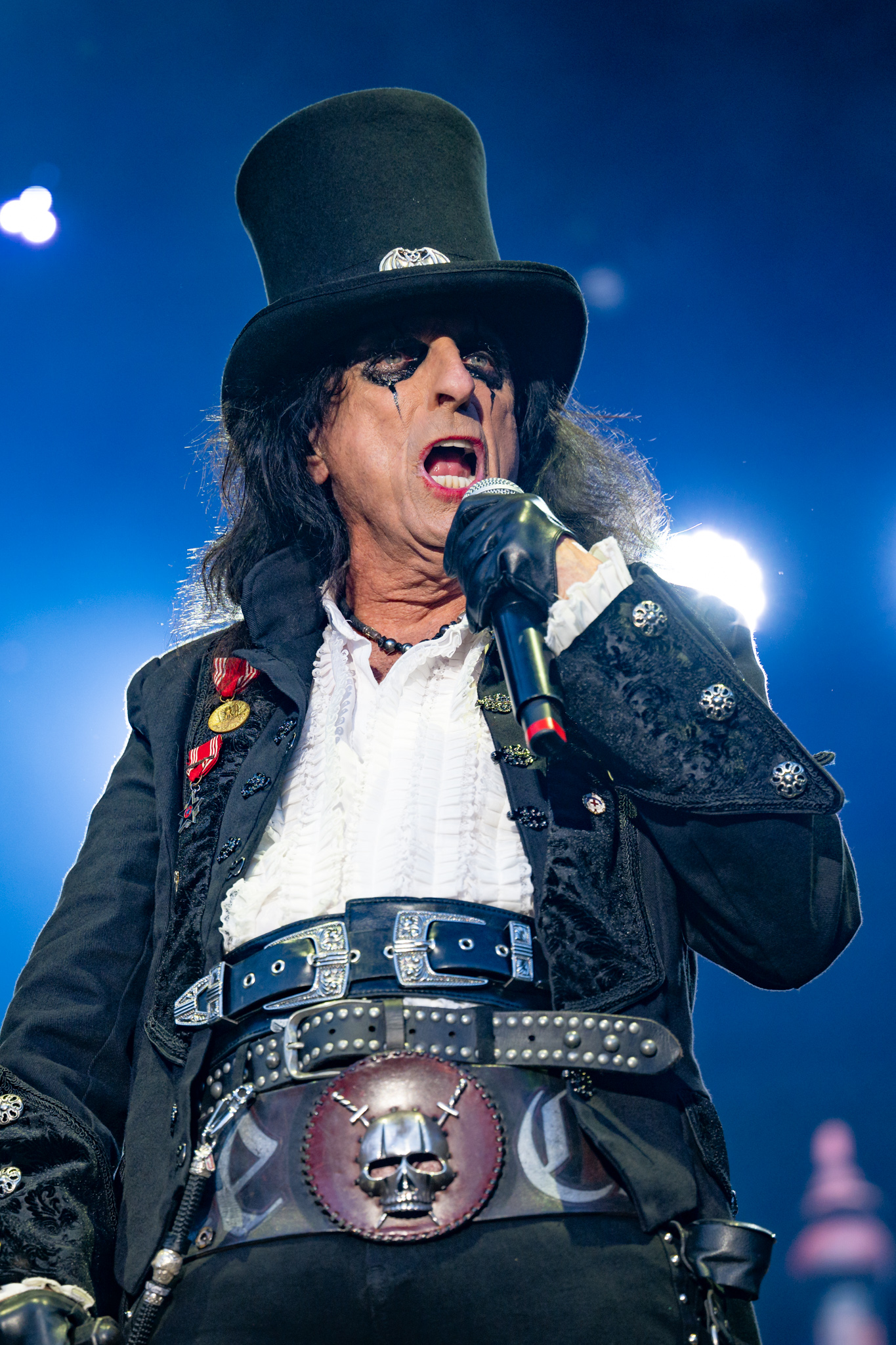
- Cooper performing in Nuremberg, Germany, 2024
- Born: Vincent Damon Furnier; February 4, 1948 (age 78); Detroit, Michigan, U.S.
- Occupations: Singer; songwriter
- Years active: 1964–present
- Works: Discography; filmography
- Spouse: Sheryl Goddard (m. 1976)
- Children: 3, including Calico Cooper
- Musical career
- Origin: Phoenix, Arizona, U.S.
- Genres: Hard rock; shock rock; glam rock; heavy metal
- Instruments: Vocals; harmonica
- Labels: Straight; Warner Bros.; Atlantic; MCA; Epic; Spitfire; Steamhammer; UMe; earMusic
- Member of: Alice Cooper (solo); Alice Cooper (band); Hollywood Vampires
- Members: List of solo band members
- Website: alicecooper.com

Alice Cooper (born Vincent Damon Furnier; February 4, 1948) is an American singer and songwriter. With a career spanning six decades, he is known for his raspy singing voice and theatrical stage shows that feature numerous props and illusions. Cooper is considered by music journalists and peers to be "The Godfather of Shock Rock". He has drawn from horror films, vaudeville, and garage rock to pioneer a macabre and theatrical brand of rock designed to shock audiences.

Originating in Phoenix, Arizona in 1964, Alice Cooper was originally a band consisting of Furnier, guitarists Glen Buxton and Michael Bruce, bassist Dennis Dunaway, and drummer Neal Smith. The band released seven studio albums from 1969 to 1973 and hit singles such as "I'm Eighteen", "School's Out", and "No More Mr. Nice Guy". Following their disbandment in 1975, Furnier legally changed his name to Alice Cooper and began a solo career with the concept album Welcome to My Nightmare (1975). His hit singles as a solo artist include "Only Women Bleed", "You and Me", and "Poison". Over the course of his career, Cooper has released 30 studio albums and sold over 50 million records worldwide. The original Alice Cooper band was inducted into the Rock and Roll Hall of Fame in 2011.

Cooper has experimented with various musical styles, mainly hard rock, glam rock, heavy metal, and glam metal, as well as new wave, art rock, and industrial rock. He helped shape the sound and look of heavy metal, and he has been described as the artist who "first introduced horror imagery to rock'n'roll, and whose stagecraft and showmanship have permanently transformed the genre". Cooper is also known for his wit offstage, with The Rolling Stone Album Guide calling him the world's most "beloved heavy metal entertainer". His philanthropic work includes his Solid Rock Foundation, which provides free music, art, and vocational programs for at-risk youth in Phoenix, Arizona.

== Early life ==
Vincent Damon Furnier was born on February 4, 1948, in Detroit, Michigan, the son of Ether Moroni Furnier (1924–1987) and his wife Ella Mae (née McCart; 1925–2022). He was named after his uncle, Vincent Collier Furnier, and the short-story writer Damon Runyon. His father was an evangelist in The Church of Jesus Christ, and his paternal grandfather Thurman Sylvester Furnier was a leader and later president (1963–1965) of that church organization.

The Furnier family resided in East Detroit on Lincoln Avenue near Kelly Road, a few blocks from Eastland Mall. Cooper attended Kantner Elementary School, recalled watching horror movies at the Eastown Theatre (where he would later perform), and local neighborhood trick-or-treating on Halloween, the "biggest night of the year", which he took "very seriously". Cooper was active in his church at ages 11 to 12. Following a series of childhood illnesses, he moved with his family to Phoenix, Arizona, where he attended Cortez High School.

== Career ==
=== 1960s ===
==== The Spiders and Nazz ====
In 1964, 16-year-old Furnier was eager to participate in Cortez High School's annual Letterman's talent show, so he gathered four fellow cross country teammates to form a group for the show: Glen Buxton, Dennis Dunaway, John Tatum, and John Speer. (Note: Cooper describes in detail in his first autobiography, Me, Alice (1976), how he was tasked with organizing an act for the show.) They named themselves the Earwigs. They dressed up in costumes and wigs to resemble the Beatles and performed several parodies of Beatles songs, with the lyrics modified to refer to the track team: in their rendition of "Please Please Me", for example, the line "Last night I said these words to my girl" was replaced with "Last night I ran four laps for my coach". Of the group, only Buxton knew how to play an instrument—the guitar—so Buxton played guitar while the rest mimed on their instruments. The group got an overwhelming response from the audience and won the talent show. As a result of their positive experience, the group decided to try to turn into a real band. They acquired musical instruments from a local pawn shop and learned to play them, with Buxton doing most of the teaching and much of the early songwriting. They soon renamed themselves the Spiders, featuring Furnier on lead vocals, Buxton on lead guitar, Tatum on rhythm guitar, Dunaway on bass guitar, and Speer on drums.

In 1966, the Spiders graduated from Cortez High School and, after North High School football player Michael Bruce replaced John Tatum on rhythm guitar, the band released their second single, "Don't Blow Your Mind", an original composition which became a local No. 1 hit, backed by "No Price Tag".

By 1967, the band had begun to make regular road trips to Los Angeles to play shows. They soon renamed themselves Nazz and released the single "Wonder Who's Lovin' Her Now", backed with future Alice Cooper track "Lay Down and Die, Goodbye". Around this time, drummer John Speer was replaced by Neal Smith. By the end of the year, the band relocated to Los Angeles.

==== Name change to Alice Cooper ====
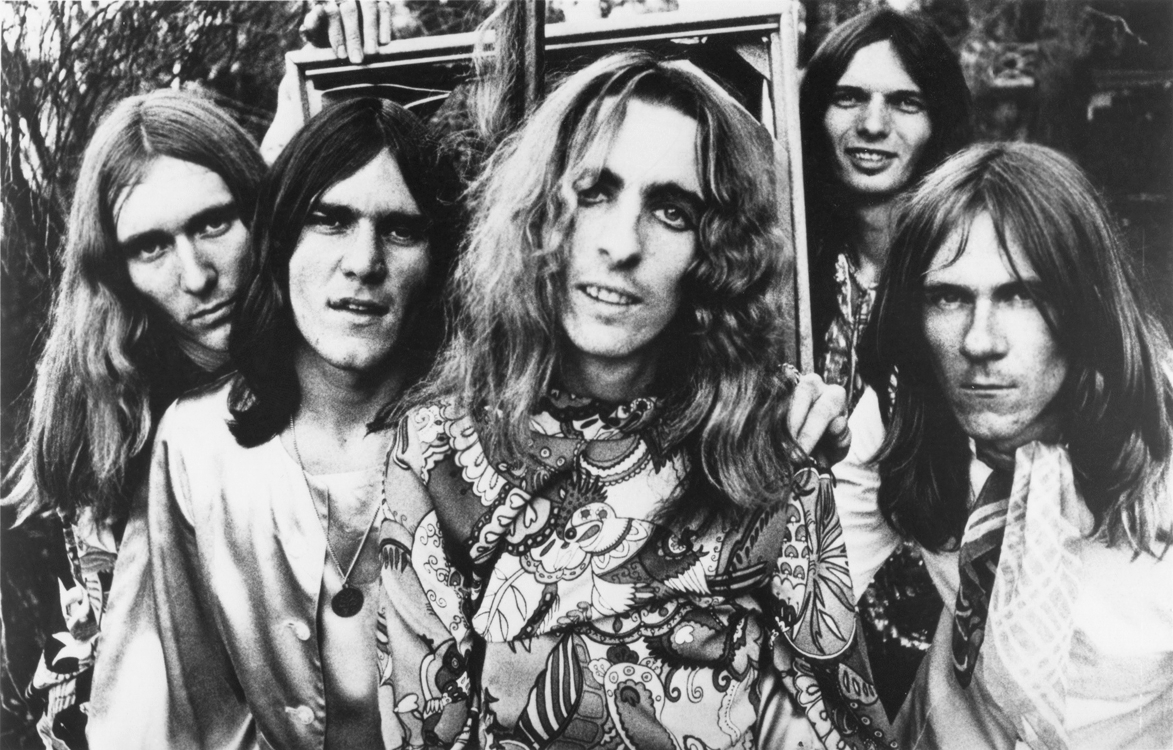
Alice Cooper band in 1969. L-R: Neal Smith, Michael Bruce, Cooper (then Vincent Furnier), Dennis Dunaway, Glen Buxton.

In 1968, the band learned that Todd Rundgren also had a band called Nazz, which was signed to a major label, and found themselves in need of another name. Furnier also believed that the group needed a gimmick to succeed, and that other bands were not exploiting the showmanship potential of the stage. They chose the name "Alice Cooper" largely because it sounded innocuous and wholesome, in humorous contrast to the band's image and music. In his 2007 book Alice Cooper, Golf Monster, Cooper stated that his look was inspired in part by films. One of the band's all-time favorite movies was What Ever Happened to Baby Jane? (1962) starring Bette Davis: "In the movie, Bette wears disgusting caked makeup smeared on her face and underneath her eyes, with deep, dark, black eyeliner." Another movie the band watched over and over was Barbarella (1968): "When I saw Anita Pallenberg playing the Great Tyrant in that movie in 1968, wearing long black leather gloves with switchblades coming out of them, I thought, 'That's what Alice should look like.' That, and a little bit of Emma Peel from The Avengers."

The classic Alice Cooper group lineup consisted of Furnier, lead guitarist Glen Buxton, rhythm guitarist Michael Bruce, bassist Dennis Dunaway, and drummer Neal Smith. With the exception of Smith, who graduated from Camelback High School (which is referred to in the song "Alma Mater" on the band's fifth studio album School's Out), all of the band members were on the Cortez High School cross-country team. Furnier, Buxton, and Dunaway were also art students, and their admiration for the works of surrealist artists such as Salvador Dalí further inspired their stage antics.

One night after an unsuccessful gig at the Cheetah club in Venice, Los Angeles, where the band emptied the entire room of patrons after playing just ten minutes, they were approached and enlisted by music manager Shep Gordon, who saw the band's negative impact that night as a force that could be turned in a more productive direction. Shep then arranged an audition for the band with composer and renowned record producer Frank Zappa, who was looking to sign bizarre music acts to his new record label, Straight Records. For the audition Zappa told them to come to his house "at 7 o'clock." The band mistakenly assumed he meant 7 o'clock in the morning. Being woken up by a band willing to play that particular brand of psychedelic rock at seven in the morning impressed Zappa enough for him to sign them to a three-album deal. Another Zappa-signed act, the all-female GTOs, who liked to "dress the Cooper boys up like full size Barbie dolls," played a major role in developing the band's early onstage look. (Note: Barry Miles's biography of Frank Zappa includes a vivid description of how the GTOs influenced Cooper to wear makeup and dress in drag onstage.)

The band's debut studio album, Pretties for You (1969), was eclectic and featured an experimental presentation of their songs in a psychedelic context.

Alice Cooper's "shock rock" reputation apparently developed almost by accident at first. An unrehearsed stage routine involving a feather pillow and a live chicken garnered attention from the press; the band decided to capitalize on the tabloid sensationalism, creating in the process a new subgenre, shock rock. Cooper claims that the infamous "Chicken Incident" at the Toronto Rock and Roll Revival concert in September 1969 was an accident. A chicken somehow made its way onto the stage into the feathers of a feather pillow that was opened during Cooper's performance and, not having any experience with farm animals, Cooper presumed that, because the chicken had wings, it would be able to fly. He picked it up and threw it out over the crowd, expecting it to fly away. The chicken instead plummeted into the first few rows occupied by wheelchair users, who reportedly proceeded to tear the bird to pieces. (Note: Cooper confirms this version of events in an interview in Alice Cooper: Prime Cuts.) The next day the incident made the front page of national newspapers, and Zappa phoned Cooper and asked if the story, which reported that he had bitten off the chicken's head and drunk its blood on stage, was true. Cooper denied the rumor, whereupon Zappa told him, "Well, whatever you do, don't tell anyone you didn't do it." (Note: Five years later, the Chicken Incident was parodied in the second verse of the Ray Stevens song "The Moonlight Special", with Cooper referred to as Agnes Stoopa.)

The band later claimed that this period was highly influenced by Pink Floyd, especially their debut studio album The Piper at the Gates of Dawn (1967), the only Pink Floyd album made under the leadership of founding member Syd Barrett (lead vocals and guitar). Glen Buxton said he could listen to Barrett's guitar for hours at a time.

=== 1970–1974 ===
Despite the publicity from the chicken incident, the band's second studio album, Easy Action, produced by David Briggs and released in June 1970, fared even worse than its predecessor, entirely failing to chart within the Billboard Top 200. Around this time, fed up with Californians' indifference to their act, they relocated to Pontiac, Michigan, where their bizarre stage act was much better received by Midwestern crowds accustomed to the proto-punk styles of local bands such as the Stooges and the MC5. Despite this, Cooper still managed to receive a cream pie in the face when performing at the Cincinnati Pop Festival. Michigan remained their steady home base until 1972. "L.A. just didn't get it," Cooper stated. "They were all on the wrong drug for us. They were on acid and we were basically drinking beer. We fit much more in Detroit than we did anywhere else."

Alice Cooper appeared at the Woodstock-esque Strawberry Fields Festival near Toronto, Ontario, in August 1970. The band's mix of glam and increasingly violent stage theatrics stood out in stark contrast to the bearded, denim-clad hippie bands of the time. As Cooper himself stated: "We were into fun, sex, death and money when everybody was into peace and love. We wanted to see what was next. It turned out we were next, and we drove a stake through the heart of the Love Generation".

In autumn 1970, the Alice Cooper group teamed with producer Bob Ezrin for the recording of their third studio album, Love It to Death. This was the final album in their Straight Records contract and the band's last chance to create a hit. That first success came with the single "I'm Eighteen", released in November 1970, which reached number 21 on the Billboard Hot 100 in early 1971. Not long after the album's release in January 1971, Warner Bros. Records purchased Alice Cooper's contract from Straight and re-issued the album, giving the group a higher level of promotion.

Love It to Death proved to be their breakthrough studio album, reaching number 35 on the U.S. Billboard 200 album charts. It was the first of 11 (Note: See the Alice Cooper entry under List of albums produced by Ezrin at Ezrin's Wikipedia page) Alice Cooper group and solo albums produced by Ezrin, who is widely seen as being pivotal in helping to create and develop the band's definitive sound.

The group's 1971 tour featured a stage show involving mock fights and gothic torture modes being imposed on Cooper, climaxing in a staged execution by electric chair, with the band sporting tight, sequined, color-contrasting glam rock-style costumes made by prominent rock-fashion designer Cindy Dunaway (sister of band member Neal Smith, and wife of band member Dennis Dunaway). Cooper's androgynous stage role had developed to present a villainous side, portraying a potential threat to modern society. The success of the band's single and album, and their tour of 1971, which included their first tour of Europe (audience members reportedly included Elton John and a pre-Ziggy Stardust David Bowie), provided enough encouragement for Warner Bros. to offer the band a new multi-album contract.

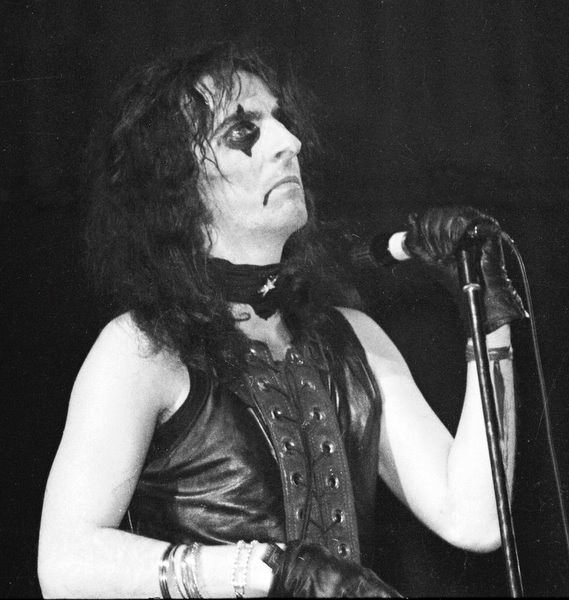
Cooper performing in 1972

Their follow-up studio album Killer, released in November 1971, continued the commercial success of Love It to Death and included further single success with "Under My Wheels", "Be My Lover" in early 1972, and "Halo of Flies", which became a Top 10 hit in the Netherlands in 1973. Thematically, Killer expanded on the villainous side of Cooper's androgynous stage role, with its music becoming the soundtrack to the group's morality-based stage show, which by then featured a boa constrictor hugging Cooper on stage, the murderous axe chopping of bloodied baby dolls, and execution by hanging at the gallows. In January 1972, Cooper was again asked about his peculiar name, and told talk show hostess Dinah Shore that he took the name from a "Mayberry RFD" character.

The summer of 1972 saw the release of the single "School's Out". It went Top 10 in the U.S. and to number 1 in the UK, and remains a staple on classic rock radio to this day. The studio album School's Out reached No. 2 on the US charts and sold over a million copies. The band relocated to their new mansion in Greenwich, Connecticut. With Cooper's on stage androgynous persona completely replaced with brattiness and machismo, the band solidified their success with subsequent tours in the United States and Europe, and won over devoted fans in droves while at the same time horrifying parents and outraging the social establishment. In the United Kingdom, Mary Whitehouse, a Christian morality campaigner, persuaded the BBC to ban the video for "School's Out", although Whitehouse's campaign did not prevent the single also reaching number one in the UK. Cooper sent her a bunch of flowers in gratitude for the publicity. Meanwhile, British Labour Member of Parliament Leo Abse petitioned Home Secretary Reginald Maudling to have the group banned altogether from performing in the country.

In February 1973, Billion Dollar Babies was released worldwide and became the band's most commercially successful studio album, reaching No. 1 in both the US and UK. "Elected", a late-1972 Top 10 UK hit from the album, which inspired one of the first MTV-style story-line promo videos ever made for a song (three years before Queen's promotional video for "Bohemian Rhapsody"), was followed by two more UK Top 10 singles, "Hello Hooray" and "No More Mr. Nice Guy", the latter of which was the last UK single from the album; it reached No. 25 in the US. The title track, featuring guest vocals by Donovan, was also a US hit single. Around this time Glen Buxton left Alice Cooper briefly because of waning health.

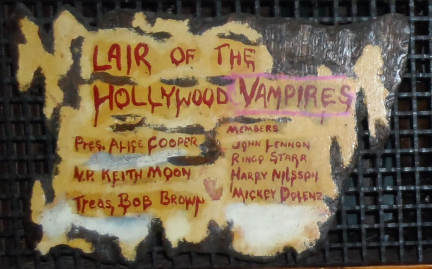
In the 1970s, Cooper founded a celebrity drinking club, the Hollywood Vampires, headquartered at the Rainbow Bar and Grill in West Hollywood, California

With a string of successful concept albums and several hit singles, the band continued their grueling schedule and toured the United States again. Continued attempts by politicians and pressure groups to ban their shocking act only served to fuel the legend of Alice Cooper further and generate even greater public interest. Their 1973 US tour broke box office records previously set by the Rolling Stones and raised rock theatrics to new heights; the multi-level stage show by then featured numerous special effects, including Billion Dollar Bills, decapitated baby dolls and mannequins, a dental psychosis scene complete with dancing teeth, and the ultimate execution prop and highlight of the show: the guillotine. The guillotine and other stage effects were designed for the band by magician James Randi, who appeared on stage during some of the shows as executioner. In 2012 at Dragon Con, Randi and Cooper discussed their working relationship during this period. The Alice Cooper group had now reached its peak and it was among the most visible and successful acts in the industry. Beneath the surface, however, the repetitive schedule of recording and touring had begun to take its toll on the band.

Muscle of Love, released at the end of 1973, was to be the last studio album from the classic lineup, and marked Alice Cooper's last UK Top 20 single of the 1970s with "Teenage Lament '74". An unsolicited theme song was recorded for the James Bond spy film The Man with the Golden Gun (1974), but a different song of the same name by Lulu was chosen instead. By 1974, the Muscle of Love album still had not matched the top-charting success of its predecessor, and the band began to have constant disagreements. For various reasons, the members agreed to take what was expected to be a temporary hiatus. "Everyone decided they needed a rest from one another", said manager Shep Gordon at the time. "A lot of pressure had built up, but it's nothing that can't be dealt with. Everybody still gets together and talks." Journalist Bob Greene spent several weeks on the road with the band during the Muscle of Love Christmas Tour in 1973. His book Billion Dollar Baby, released in November 1974, painted a less-than-flattering picture of the band, showing a group in total disharmony. Cooper later wrote an autobiography with Steven Gaines called Me, Alice (1976) which gave Cooper's version of that era of his career, among other things.

During this time, Cooper relocated back to Los Angeles and started appearing regularly on television shows such as The Hollywood Squares, and Warner Bros. released the Greatest Hits compilation album. It featured classic-style artwork and reached the US Top 10, performing better than Muscle of Love. However, the band's 1974 feature film Good to See You Again, Alice Cooper (consisting mainly of 1973 concert footage with 'comedic' sketches woven throughout to a faint storyline), released on a minor cinematic run mostly to drive-in theaters, saw little box office success. On March 5, 1974, Cooper appeared on episode 3 of The Snoop Sisters playing a Satanic cult singer. The final shows by Alice Cooper as a group were in Brazil in March and April 1974, including the record indoor attendance estimated as high as 158,000 fans in São Paulo on March 30, at the Anhembi Exposition Hall at the start of the first ever South American rock tour.

=== 1975–1979 ===
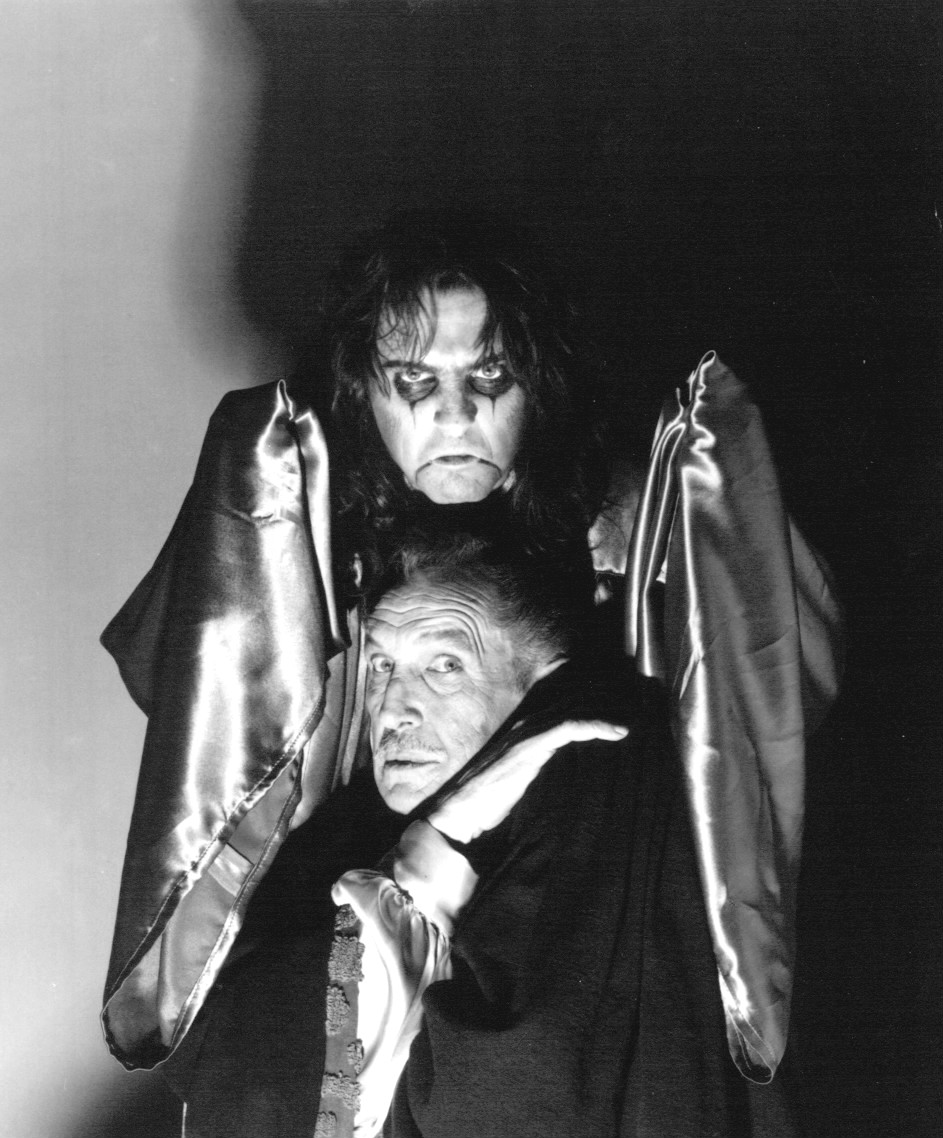
Cooper and Vincent Price in Alice Cooper: The Nightmare, 1975

In 1975, Alice Cooper returned as a solo artist with the release of Welcome to My Nightmare. To avoid legal complications over ownership of the group name, "Alice Cooper" had by then become Furnier's new legal name. Speaking on the subject of Alice Cooper continuing as a solo project as opposed to the band it once was, Cooper stated in 1975, "It got very basically down to the fact that we had drawn as much as we could out of each other. After ten years, we got pretty dry together." Manager Gordon added, "What had started in a sense as a pipe-dream became an overwhelming burden." The success of Welcome to My Nightmare marked the final breakup of the original members of the band, with Cooper collaborating with their producer Bob Ezrin, who recruited Lou Reed's backing band, including guitarists Dick Wagner and Steve Hunter, to play on the album. Spearheaded by the US Top 20 hit ballad "Only Women Bleed", the album was released by Atlantic Records in March of that year and became a Top 10 hit for Cooper. It was a concept album that was based on the nightmare of a child named Steven, featuring narration by classic horror movie film star Vincent Price, and serving as the soundtrack to Cooper's new stage show, which now showcased more theatrics than ever, including an 8-foot-tall (2.4 m) furry Cyclops which Cooper decapitated and killed.

Accompanying the album and stage show was the television special Alice Cooper: The Nightmare, starring Cooper and Vincent Price, which aired on US prime-time TV in April 1975. The Nightmare (which was later released on home video in 1983 and gained a Grammy Award nomination for Best Long Form Music Video) was regarded as another groundbreaking moment in rock history. Adding to it all, a concert film, Welcome to My Nightmare, produced, directed, and choreographed by West Side Story cast member David Winters and filmed live at London's Wembley Arena in September 1975, was released to theaters in 1976. The film was released in a special edition DVD in 2017.

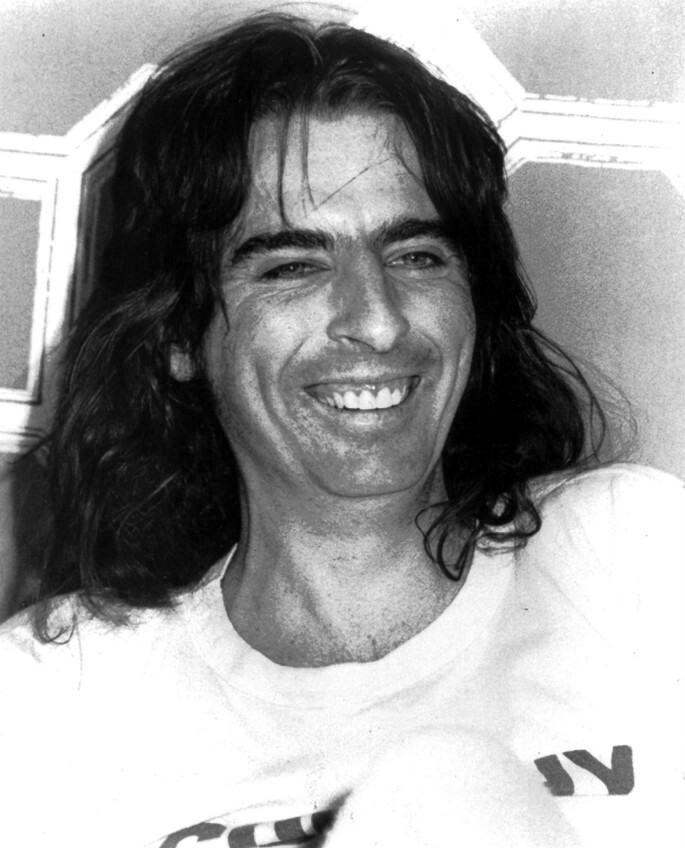
Cooper in 1976

Such was the immense success of Cooper's solo project that he decided to continue as a solo artist, and the original band became officially defunct. Bruce, Dunaway, and Smith went on to form the short-lived band Billion Dollar Babies, producing one studio album—Battle Axe—in 1977. While occasionally performing with one another and Glen Buxton, they did not reunite with Alice until October 23, 1999, at the second Glen Buxton Memorial Weekend for a show at CoopersTown in Phoenix. They reunited for another show, with Steve Hunter on guitar, on December 16, 2010, at the Dodge Theatre in Phoenix. This lineup performed together again (televised) on March 14, 2011, at the induction of the original Alice Cooper group into the Rock and Roll Hall of Fame, as well as on May 11, 2011, at London's Battersea Power Station at the Jägermeister Ice Cold 4D event (webcast). In 2011, Bruce, Dunaway, and Smith appeared on three tracks they co-wrote on Alice's solo studio album Welcome 2 My Nightmare. In 2017, they appeared on two tracks they co-wrote on Alice's solo studio album Paranormal, released in July, and in November they joined his current live band for five tour dates in the United Kingdom.

Following the 1976 US No. 12 ballad hit "I Never Cry"; two studio albums, Alice Cooper Goes to Hell and Lace and Whiskey; and the 1977 US No. 9 ballad hit "You and Me", it became clear during his 1977 US tour that Cooper was in dire need of help with his alcoholism (at his alcoholic peak it was rumored that he was consuming up to two cases of Budweiser beer and a bottle of Seagram's Seven Crown whiskey a day). Following the tour, Cooper had himself hospitalized in a sanitarium for treatment, during which time the live album The Alice Cooper Show was released.

In 1978, a sobered Cooper used his experience in the sanitarium as the inspiration for his semi-autobiographical studio album From the Inside, which he co-wrote with Bernie Taupin, known for his work with Elton John; it spawned yet another US Top 20 hit ballad, "How You Gonna See Me Now". The subsequent tour's stage show was based inside an asylum, and was filmed for Cooper's first home-video release, The Strange Case of Alice Cooper, in 1979. Around this time, Cooper performed "Welcome to My Nightmare", "You and Me", and "School's Out" on The Muppet Show (episode #307) on March 28, 1978 (he played one of the devil's henchmen trying to dupe Kermit the Frog, Gonzo and Miss Piggy into selling their souls). He also appeared in an against-typecasting role as a piano-playing disco waiter in Mae West's final film, Sextette, and as a villain in the film Sgt. Pepper's Lonely Hearts Club Band. Cooper also led celebrities in raising money to remodel the famous Hollywood Sign in Los Angeles, California. Cooper himself contributed over $27,000 to the project, buying an O in the sign in memory of close friend and comedian Groucho Marx. In 1979, Cooper also guest starred on good friend Soupy Sales' show, Lunch with Soupy Sales and was hit in the face with a pie, as part of the show. When asked about the experience, Cooper had this to say about his friend: "Being from Detroit, I came home every day and watched Soupy at lunch (Lunch with Soupy Sales). One of the greatest moments of my life was getting pie-faced by Soupy. He was one of my all time heroes."

=== 1980s ===
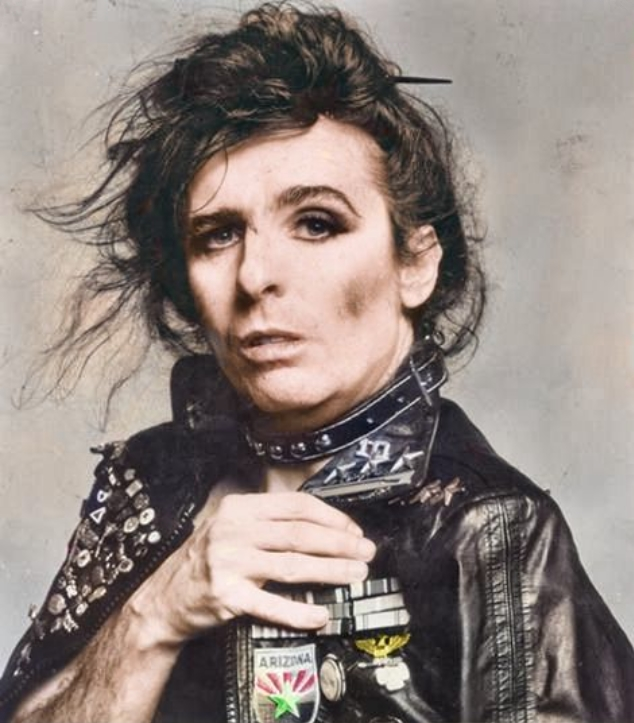
Cooper in 1981

Cooper's studio albums from the beginning of the 1980s have been referred to by Cooper as his "blackout albums" because he cannot remember recording them, owing to the influence of his new, and increasing, cocaine addiction. Flush the Fashion (1980), Special Forces (1981), Zipper Catches Skin (1982) and DaDa (1983) saw a gradual commercial decline, with the last two not charting within the Billboard Top 200. Flush the Fashion, produced by Roy Thomas Baker, known for his work with Queen and the Cars, had a thick, edgy new wave musical sound that baffled even longtime fans, though it still yielded the US Top 40 hit "Clones (We're All)". The track also surprisingly charted on the US Disco Top 100 chart. Special Forces featured a more aggressive but consistent new wave style, and included a new version of "Generation Landslide" from Billion Dollar Babies (1973). His tour for Special Forces marked Cooper's last time on the road for nearly five years; it was not until 1986, for Constrictor, that he toured again. 1982's Zipper Catches Skin was a more pop-punk-oriented recording, containing many quirky high-energy guitar-driven songs along with his most unusual collection of subject matters for lyrics, and Patty Donahue of the Waitresses provided guest vocals and "sarcasm" on the track "I Like Girls". 1983 marked the return collaboration of producer Bob Ezrin and guitarist Dick Wagner for the haunting epic DaDa, the final studio album in his Warner Bros. contract.

In mid-1983, after the recording of DaDa was completed, Cooper was hospitalized for alcoholism again, and cirrhosis of the liver. He credits his Christian faith for a recovery doctors described as "miraculous" and he talks of how he did not "recover" but how his addiction was "taken away" by Jesus Christ. Cooper was finally stable and sober (and has remained sober since that time) by the time DaDa and The Nightmare home video (of his 1975 TV Special) were released in the fall of that year; however, both releases performed below expectations. Even with The Nightmare scoring a nomination for 1984's Grammy Award for Best Long Form Music Video (he lost to Duran Duran), it was not enough for Warner Bros. to keep Cooper on their books. By February 1984, Cooper became a "free agent" for the first time in his career.

Cooper spent a lengthy period away from the music business dealing with personal problems. His divorce from Sheryl Cooper was heard at Maricopa County Superior Court, Arizona, on January 30, 1984, but a decision was made by the couple not to move forward with the divorce. The following month he guested at the 26th Annual Grammy Awards alongside co-presenter Grace Jones. He also returned to his native Phoenix, Arizona: "It was kind of a dramatic move back, because I had just finished my thirteen-year alcoholic career in Los Angeles. To me, the Hollywood social scene was nothing but drinking and partying every night."

Behind the scenes Cooper kept busy musically, working on material with Aerosmith guitarist Joe Perry. The spring of 1984 was taken up with filming, Cooper acting in the B-grade horror movie Monster Dog, filmed in Torrelodones, Spain. Shortly thereafter he reconciled with Sheryl.

The year closed with more writing sessions, this time in New York during November with Hanoi Rocks guitarist Andy McCoy. In 1985, he met and began writing songs with guitarist Kane Roberts. Cooper was subsequently signed to MCA Records, and appeared as guest vocalist on Twisted Sister's song "Be Chrool to Your Scuel". A music video for the song featured actor Luke Perry and Cooper donning his black snake-eyes makeup for the first time since 1979, but neither the song nor video drew public interest.

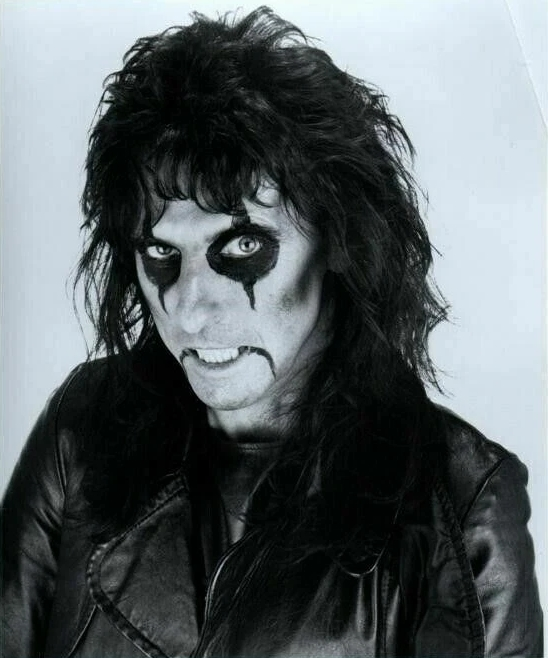
Cooper in 1986

In 1986, Alice Cooper officially returned to the music industry with the studio album Constrictor. The album spawned the hits "He's Back (The Man Behind the Mask)" (the theme song for the movie Friday the 13th Part VI: Jason Lives; in the video for the song Cooper was given a cameo role as a deranged psychiatrist) and the fan favorite "Teenage Frankenstein". The Constrictor album was a catalyst for Cooper to make a triumphant return to the road for the first time since the 1981 Special Forces project, on a tour titled The Nightmare Returns. The Detroit leg of this tour, which took place at the end of October 1986 during Halloween, was captured on film as The Nightmare Returns (1987), and is viewed by some as being the definitive Alice Cooper concert film. It was released on DVD in 2006. The concert, which received rave reviews in the rock music press, (Note: For example, see the November 13, 1986, issue of Kerrang! music magazine, whose front cover bears the headline 'The Night He Came Home ... Alice Knocks 'Em Dead in Detroit'.) was also described by Rolling Stone magazine as bringing "Cooper's violent, twisted onstage fantasies to a new generation". The Constrictor album was followed by Raise Your Fist and Yell in 1987, which had an even rougher sound than its predecessor, as well as the Cooper classic "Freedom". The subsequent tour of Raise Your Fist and Yell, which was heavily inspired by the slasher horror movies of the time such as the Friday the 13th series and A Nightmare on Elm Street, served up a shocking spectacle similar to its predecessor, and courted the kind of controversy, especially in Europe, that recalled the public outrage caused by Cooper's public performances in America in the early 1970s.

In Britain, Labour MP David Blunkett called for the show to be banned, saying "I'm horrified by his behaviour – it goes beyond the bounds of entertainment." The controversy spilled over into the German segment of the tour, with the German government actually succeeding in having some of the gorier segments of the performance removed. It was also during the London leg of the tour that Cooper met with a near fatal accident during rehearsal of the hanging execution sequence that occurs at the end of the show.

Constrictor and Raise Your Fist and Yell were recorded with lead guitarist Kane Roberts and bassist Kip Winger, both of whom left the band by the end of 1988 (although Kane Roberts played guitar on "Bed of Nails" on Cooper's 1989 studio album Trash).

In 1987, Cooper made a brief appearance as a vagrant in the supernatural horror film Prince of Darkness, directed by John Carpenter. His role had no lines and consisted of generally menacing the protagonists before eventually impaling one of them with a bicycle frame.

Also in 1987, Cooper appeared at WrestleMania III, escorting wrestler Jake "The Snake" Roberts to the ring for his match against The Honky Tonk Man. After the match, which Roberts lost, ended, Cooper got involved and threw Jake's snake Damien at Honky's manager Jimmy Hart. Roberts considered the involvement of Cooper to be an honor, as he had idolized Cooper in his youth and was still a huge fan. WrestleMania III, which attracted a WWF record 93,173 fans, was held in the Pontiac Silverdome near Cooper's home town of Detroit.

Cooper recorded a music video for the "Poison" B-side "I Got a Line on You" after the song was featured on the soundtrack to Iron Eagle II (1988).

On April 7, 1988, Cooper nearly died of asphyxiation after a safety rope broke during a rehearsal concert wherein he pretended to hang himself, a stunt he often performed during live concerts.

In 1988, Cooper's contract with MCA Records expired and he signed with Epic Records. Then in 1989 his career finally experienced a legitimate revival with the Desmond Child produced and Grammy-nominated studio album Trash, which spawned a hit single "Poison", which reached No. 2 in the UK and No. 7 in the US, and a worldwide arena tour.

=== 1990s ===
In 1991, Cooper released his nineteenth studio album Hey Stoopid featuring several notable rock musicians guesting on the record. Released as glam metal's popularity was on the wane, and just before the explosion of grunge, it failed to have the same commercial impact as its predecessor. The same year also saw the release of the video Alice Cooper: Prime Cuts which chronicled his entire career using in depth interviews with Cooper himself, Bob Ezrin, and Shep Gordon. One critic has noted that Prime Cuts demonstrates how Cooper had used (in contrast to similar artists who succeeded him) themes of satire and moralization to such good effect throughout his career. It was in the Prime Cuts video that Bob Ezrin delivered his own summation of the Alice Cooper persona: "He is the psycho killer in all of us. He's the axe murderer, he's the spoiled child, he's the abuser, he's the abused; he's the perpetrator, he's the victim, he's the gun slinger, and he's the guy lying dead in the middle of the street".

During the early 1990s, Cooper guested on records by the most successful bands of the time, such as the Guns N' Roses third studio album Use Your Illusion I, on which he shared vocal duties with Axl Rose on the track "The Garden". He also had a brief appearance as the abusive stepfather of Freddy Krueger in the A Nightmare on Elm Street slasher film Freddy's Dead: The Final Nightmare (1991).

Cooper made a cameo appearance in the 1992 comedy film Wayne's World. Cooper and his band first appear on stage performing "Feed My Frankenstein" from their studio album Hey Stoopid. Afterward at a backstage party, the movie's main characters Wayne Cambell and Garth Algar discover that when offstage, Cooper is a calm, articulate intellectual as he and his band discuss the history of Milwaukee in depth. Wayne and Garth respond to an invitation to hang out with Cooper by kneeling and bowing reverently before him while chanting "We're not worthy! We're not worthy!"

In 1994, Cooper released The Last Temptation, his first concept album since DaDa (1983). The album deals with issues of faith, temptation, alienation and the frustrations of modern life, and has been described as "a young man's struggle to see the truth through the distractions of the "sideshow" of the modern world". Concurrent with the release of The Last Temptation was a three-part comic book series written by Neil Gaiman, fleshing out the album's story. This was to be Cooper's last album with Epic Records since according to Brian "Renfield" Nelson, Cooper's personal assistant, "Alice was interested in going to Hollywood Records even before 'The Last Temptation' was released because Bob Pfeifer, who originally signed Alice to Epic, was now the President of Hollywood Records. After 'The Last Temptation' was finished, Alice requested that Sony/Epic let him go so that he could make the switch to Hollywood. He just wanted to go where his friends are." and was his last studio release for six years, though during this period the live album A Fistful of Alice (1997) was released, and in 1997 he lent his voice to the intro track of Insane Clown Posse's The Great Milenko.

During his absence from the recording studio, Cooper toured extensively every year throughout the latter part of the 1990s, including, in 1996, South America, which he had not visited since 1974. Also in 1996, Cooper sang the role of Herod on the London cast recording of the musical Jesus Christ Superstar.

In 1999, the four-disc box set The Life and Crimes of Alice Cooper appeared, which contained the authorized biography of Cooper, Alcohol and Razor Blades, Poison and Needles: The Glorious Wretched Excess of Alice Cooper, All-American, written by Creem magazine editor Jeffrey Morgan.

=== 2000s ===
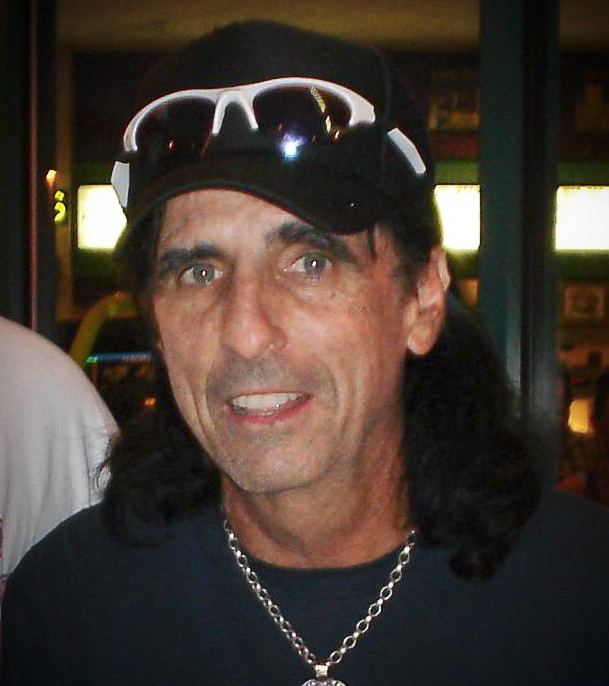
Cooper in 2006

The first decade of the 21st century saw a sustained period of activity from Alice Cooper, the decade in which he turned 60. He toured extensively releasing a steady stream of studio albums to favorable critical acclaim. Beginning in 2000 with Brutal Planet, a return to horror-filled heavy metal, industrial rock, set in a dystopian post-apocalyptic future. The album was produced by Bob Marlette, with longtime Cooper production collaborator Bob Ezrin returning as executive producer. The accompanying world tour, which included Cooper's first concert in Russia, also resulted in Brutally Live (2000), a DVD of a concert, recorded in London, England, on July 19, 2000.

Cooper made a guest appearance in 2001 on a third-season episode of That '70s Show titled "Radio Daze", in which he partook in a game of Dungeons & Dragons.

Brutal Planet was succeeded by the sonically similar and acclaimed sequel Dragontown (2001), which saw Bob Ezrin back as producer. The album has been described as leading the listener down "a nightmarish path into the mind of rock's original conceptual storyteller" and by Cooper himself as being "the worst town on Brutal Planet". Like The Last Temptation, both Brutal Planet and Dragontown are albums which explore Cooper's born-again Christianity. It is often cited in the music media that Dragontown forms the third chapter in a trilogy begun with The Last Temptation; however, Cooper has indicated that this in fact is not the case.

Cooper again adopted a leaner, cleaner sound for his critically acclaimed 2003 release The Eyes of Alice Cooper. Recognizing that many contemporary bands were having great success with his former sounds and styles, Cooper worked with a somewhat younger group of road and studio musicians who were familiar with his oeuvre of old. The resulting Bare Bones tour adopted a less-orchestrated performance style that had fewer theatrical flourishes and a greater emphasis on musicality.

Cooper's radio show Nights with Alice Cooper began airing on January 26, 2004, in several US cities. The program showcases classic rock, Cooper's personal stories about his life as a rock icon and interviews with prominent rock artists. The show is broadcast on nearly 100 stations in the US and Canada, and has been broadcast internationally.

A continuation of the songwriting approach adopted on The Eyes of Alice Cooper was again adopted by Cooper for his seventeenth solo studio album Dirty Diamonds, released in 2005. Dirty Diamonds became Cooper's highest-charting album since 1994's The Last Temptation at the time. The Dirty Diamonds tour launched in America in August 2005 after several European concerts, including a performance at the Montreux Jazz Festival in Switzerland on July 12. Cooper and his band, including Kiss drummer Eric Singer, were filmed for a DVD released as Alice Cooper: Live at Montreux 2005 (2006). One critic, in a review of the Montreux release, commented that Cooper was to be applauded for "still mining pretty much the same territory of teenage angst and rebellion" as he had done more than 30 years previously.

In December 2006, the original Alice Cooper band reunited to perform six classic Alice Cooper songs at Cooper's annual charity event in Phoenix, entitled "Christmas Pudding". (Note: Damon Johnson, a guitarist in Cooper's then band, filled in for the deceased Glen Buxton.)

On July 1, 2007, Cooper performed a duet with Marilyn Manson at the B'Estival event in Bucharest, Romania. The performance represented a reconciliation between the two artists; Cooper had previously taken issue with Manson over his overtly anti-Christian on stage antics and had sarcastically made reference to the originality of Manson's choosing a female name and dressing in women's clothing. Cooper and Manson have been the subject of an academic paper on the significance of adolescent antiheroes.

In January 2008, Cooper was one of the guest singers on Avantasia's third studio album The Scarecrow, singing the seventh track "The Toy Master". In July 2008, after lengthy delays, Cooper released Along Came a Spider, his eighteenth solo studio album. It was Cooper's highest-charting album since 1991's Hey Stoopid, reaching No. 53 in the US and No. 31 in the UK. The album, visiting similar territory explored in 1987's Raise Your Fist and Yell, deals with the nefarious antics of a deranged serial killer named "Spider" who is on a quest to use the limbs of his victims to create a human spider. The album generally received positive reviews from music critics, though Rolling Stone magazine opined that the music on the record sorely missed Bob Ezrin's production values. The resulting Theatre of Death tour of the album (during which Cooper is executed on four separate occasions) was described in a long November 2009 article about Cooper in The Times as "epic" and featuring "enough fake blood to remake Saving Private Ryan".

During this period Cooper was also recognized and awarded in various ways: given a star on the Hollywood Walk of Fame in 2003; in May 2004 he received an honorary doctoral degree from Grand Canyon University. In June 2005, he was inducted into the Michigan Rock and Roll Legends Hall of Fame. In May 2006 he was given the key to the city of Alice, North Dakota. He won the living legend award at the 2006 Classic Rock Roll of Honour Awards event; and he won the 2007 Mojo music magazine Hero Award. He received a Rock Immortal award at the 2007 Scream Awards.

Cooper appeared on the British TV series Room 101 where a balloon model of him was featured.

=== 2010s ===
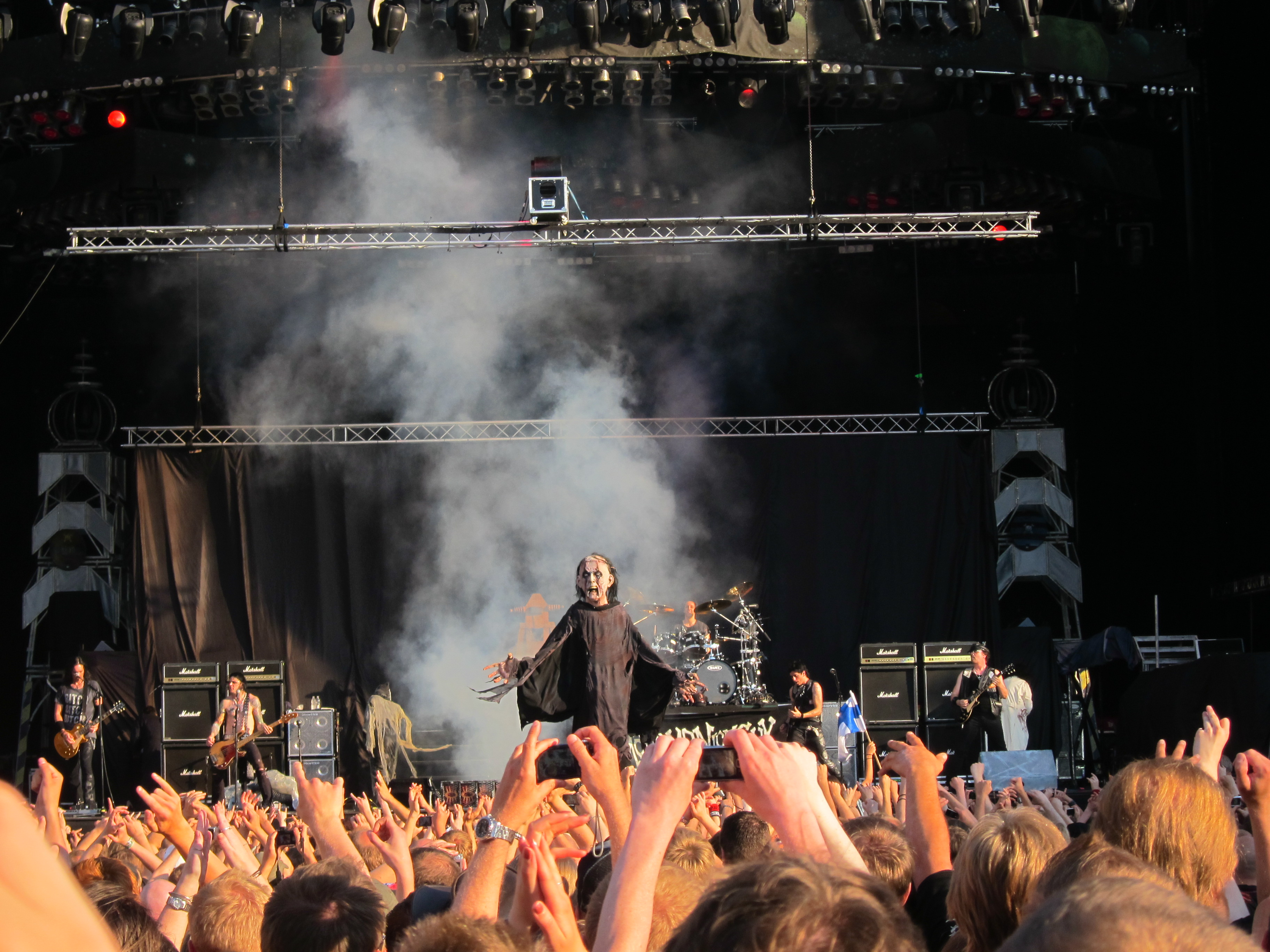
Cooper performing at the Helsinki Olympic Stadium in Helsinki, Finland, 2011

In January 2010, it was announced that Cooper would be touring with Rob Zombie on The Gruesome Twosome Tour. In May 2010, Cooper made an appearance during the beginning of the season finale of the singing competition show American Idol, in which he sang "School's Out".

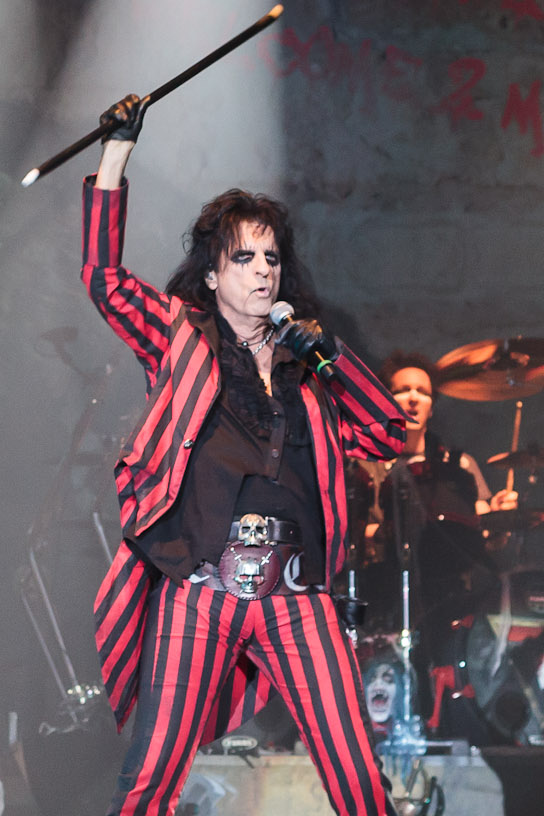
Cooper performing live at Wembley Arena in London, England, 2012

With his daughter, and former band member Dick Wagner, Cooper scored the music for the indie horror flick Silas Gore (2010).

During 2010, Cooper began working on a new studio album, dubbed Welcome 2 My Nightmare, a sequel to the original Welcome to My Nightmare (1975). In a Radio Metal interview, he said that "We'll put some of the original people on it and add some new people ... I'm very happy with working with Bob (Ezrin) again."

On December 15, 2010, it was announced Cooper and his former band would be inducted into the Rock and Roll Hall of Fame. The induction ceremony took place on March 14, 2011, where Cooper was inducted by fellow horror-rocker Rob Zombie. Original members Bruce, Cooper, Dunaway, and Smith all made brief acceptance speeches and performed "I'm Eighteen" and "School's Out" live together, with Steve Hunter filling in for the late Glen Buxton. Cooper showed up for the event wearing a (presumably fake) blood-splattered shirt and had a live albino Burmese python wrapped around his neck. Cooper told Rolling Stone magazine that he was "elated" by the news and that the nomination had been made for the original band, as "We all did go to the same high school together, and we were all on the track team, and it was pretty cool that guys that knew each other before the band ended up going that far".

On March 10, 2011, Jackson Browne, David Crosby, Graham Nash, Cooper, Jennifer Warnes, and others performed at a benefit concert in Tucson, Arizona, benefiting The Fund for Civility, Respect and Understanding, a foundation that raises awareness about and provides medical prevention and treatment services to people with mental disorders. In June 2011, Cooper took his place as the Star in a Reasonably-Priced Car at the BBC motoring show Top Gear.

On June 9, 2011, Cooper was awarded the Kerrang! Icon Award at Kerrang! magazine's annual awards show. Cooper used the opportunity to hit out at the "anaemic" rock music that dominates the charts, and said he has no intention of retiring from the industry.

Cooper supported Iron Maiden on their Maiden England World Tour from June to July 21, 2012, and then headlined Bloodstock Open Air on Sunday August 12. On September 16, 2012, Cooper appeared at the Sunflower Jam charity concert at the Royal Albert Hall, London, performing alongside Brian May lead guitarist of Queen, bassist John Paul Jones of Led Zeppelin, drummer Ian Paice of Deep Purple, and Iron Maiden lead vocalist Bruce Dickinson.

Cooper cameos as himself in the 2012 Tim Burton adaptation of Dark Shadows that starred Johnny Depp, Michelle Pfeiffer and Helena Bonham Carter. Assuming his name to be that of a woman, Depp's character in the film Barnabas Collins describes Alice as the ugliest woman he has ever seen.

In 2013, Cooper announced that he had finished recording a covers album, based on songs by his rock star drinking buddies in the 1970s who had since died from excess, and that it was scheduled for a spring 2014 release. Later he announced that the album would likely be released in 2015.

On January 28, 2014, it was officially revealed that Alice Cooper would be the opening act for Mötley Crüe's final tour, spanning 2014 and 2015. Cooper was featured on the song "Savages" on Theory of a Deadman's fifth studio album.

Cooper was the subject of Super Duper Alice Cooper, a biographical documentary film by Canadian directors Sam Dunn, Scot McFadyen and Reginald Harkema. The film won a Canadian Screen Award for Best Feature Length Documentary at the 3rd Canadian Screen Awards in 2015. In October, Cooper released the live album and video Raise the Dead: Live from Wacken, which was recorded at Germany's Wacken heavy metal festival the previous year.

In 2015, Cooper premiered Hollywood Vampires, a supergroup featuring Johnny Depp and Joe Perry with a new studio album of rock covers, featuring many guest artists including Paul McCartney, and live dates at L.A.'s Roxy Theatre and at Brazil's Rock in Rio festival in September. In 2016, Cooper made headlines again as he resumed his running gag of campaigning for the US presidency. Cooper featured as a co-headliner with Deep Purple and Edgar Winter for several tour dates from August to early September 2017.

Cooper released his twentieth solo studio album Paranormal in July 2017. It featured contributions from drummer Larry Mullen Jr. of U2, Billy Gibbons of ZZ Top on guitar and Roger Glover from Deep Purple on bass guitar. Guitarists Tommy Denander and Tommy Henriksen contributed most of the guitars.

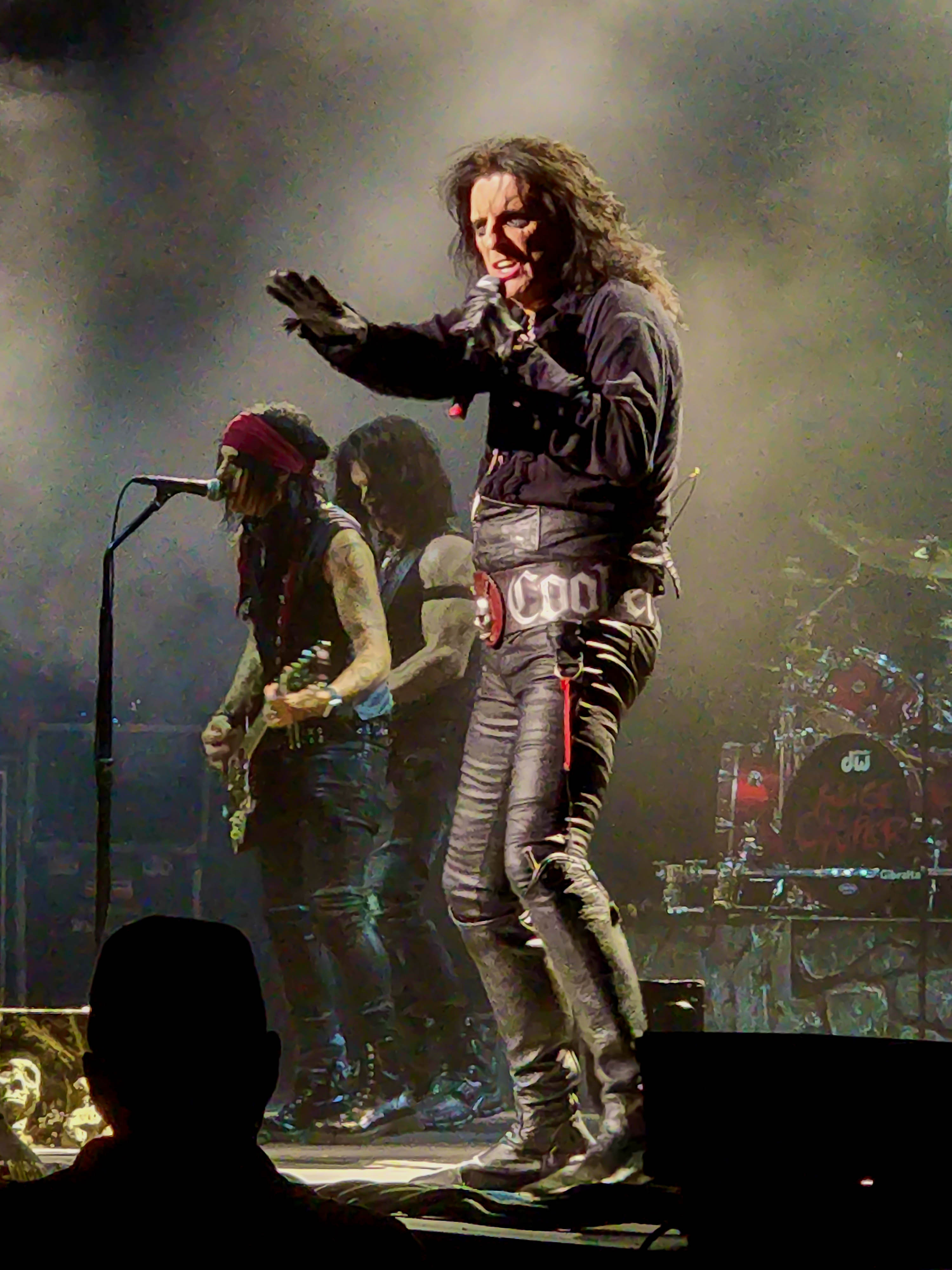
Cooper performing live at Caesars Windsor in Windsor, Ontario, 2022

On Easter Sunday, 2018, Cooper performed as Herod in NBC's live performance of Andrew Lloyd Webber's Jesus Christ Superstar Live in Concert. Reviews were positive, with The New York Times' critic Noel Murray praising "Alice Cooper's magnificently scenery-chewing performance" as a "startling moment of clarity," and Lorraine Ali of the Los Angeles Times describing his performance as, "Weird? Yes, but also perfect in a campy, dramatic and evil 'Billion Dollar Babies' kind of way. Cooper's part was small but indelible." Cooper had previously recorded the song (though not performed it live) in 2000, with the 1996 London revival cast.

=== 2020s ===
Cooper released his twenty-first solo studio album, Detroit Stories, on February 26, 2021. In May, he announced a fall tour to promote the album, supported by Ace Frehley, which began in September 2021.

Cooper wrote the afterword to Jeffrey Morgan's autobiography Rock Critic Confidential which was published by New Haven on June 28, 2021.

Cooper participated as a judge on the music competition television show No Cover season 1 that started to be aired in the Sumerian Records YouTube Channel in April 2022.

On July 11, 2022, touring guitarist Nita Strauss announced she had departed the band. A few days later, it was announced Kane Roberts had rejoined the band, replacing Strauss. On March 6, 2023, it was announced Strauss had rejoined the band.

Cooper's twenty-second studio album Road was released on August 25, 2023.

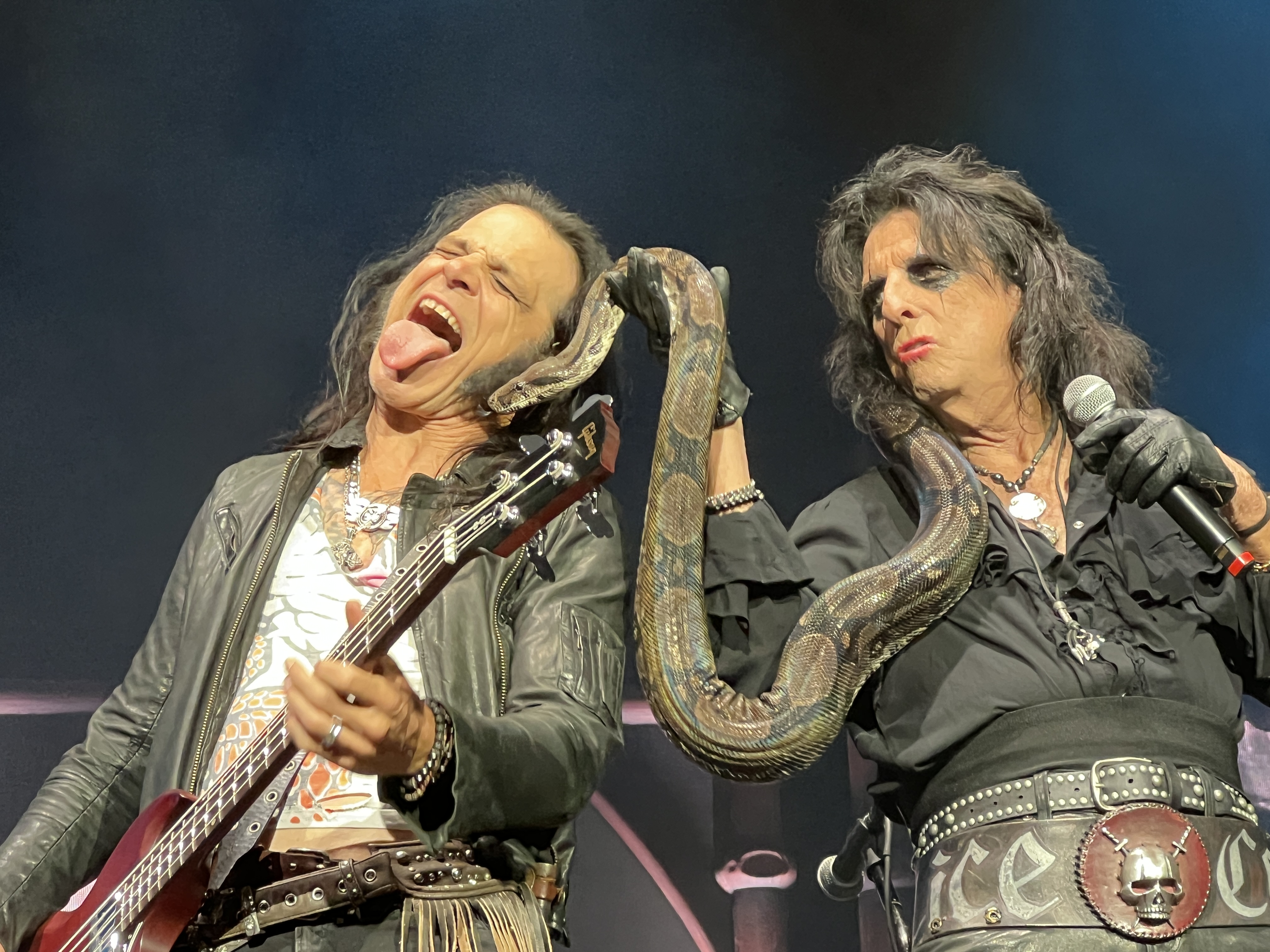
Alice Cooper and his band performing at the White River Amphitheatre in Washington state in 2023.

In the fall of 2023, Cooper co-headlined the Freaks on Parade tour with Rob Zombie, with Filter and Ministry acting as the opening acts. The tour spanned one month, lasting from August 24, 2023, until September 24, 2023, visiting 19 venues across the United States and Canada.

Cooper presents a show five weekdays on the UK's Planet Rock.

Cooper recorded the album Solid Rock Revival with different, child-friendly lyrics for his songs and those of other artists. "School's Out" became "School's In", "No More Mr. Nice Guy" became "Now, I'm Mr. Nice Guy" and "I'm Eighteen" became "I'm Thirteen". With Rob Halford he recorded "Pleasant Dreams", and with Darryl McDaniels he recorded a hip-hop version of "In the Midnight Hour" called "Midday Hour". Proceeds go to Norelli Family Foundation and Cooper's Solid Rock Foundation.

In January 2024, a newly revamped syndicated radio show, Alice's Attic with Alice Cooper syndicated by Superadio Networks debuted on over 70+ radio stations in the US and worldwide.

In April 2025, it was announced that Cooper had reunited with Michael Bruce, Dennis Dunaway and Neal Smith for a new album, titled The Revenge of Alice Cooper, making it the first since 1973's Muscle of Love to be released under the Alice Cooper band rather than as a solo album. It was released on July 25, 2025, and also includes never-before-released tracks by their original guitarist Glen Buxton.

In 2026, Cooper started performing with illusionist Criss Angel at Planet Hollywood for a set list named "Welcome to Our Nightmare".

Cooper released a memoir, Devil on My Shoulder: A Memoir, on October 6, 2026.

== Artistry ==
During an interview for the program Entertainment USA in 1986, Cooper told interviewer Jonathan King that the Yardbirds were his favorite band of all time. Cooper had as far back as 1969 said that it was music from the mid-sixties, and particularly from British bands the Beatles, the Who, and the Rolling Stones, as well as the Yardbirds, that had the greatest influence on him. Cooper later paid homage to the Who by singing "I'm a Boy" for A Celebration: The Music of Pete Townshend and The Who in 1994 at Carnegie Hall in New York, and performing a cover version of "My Generation" on the Brutal Planet tour of 2000. During an interview with Ozzy Osbourne from radio program Nights with Alice Cooper on May 22, 2007, Cooper again affirmed his debt of gratitude to these bands, and to the Beatles in particular. During their discussion, Cooper and Osbourne bemoaned the often inferior quality of songwriting coming from contemporary rock artists. Cooper stated that in his opinion the cause of the problem was that certain modern bands "had forgotten to listen to the Beatles".

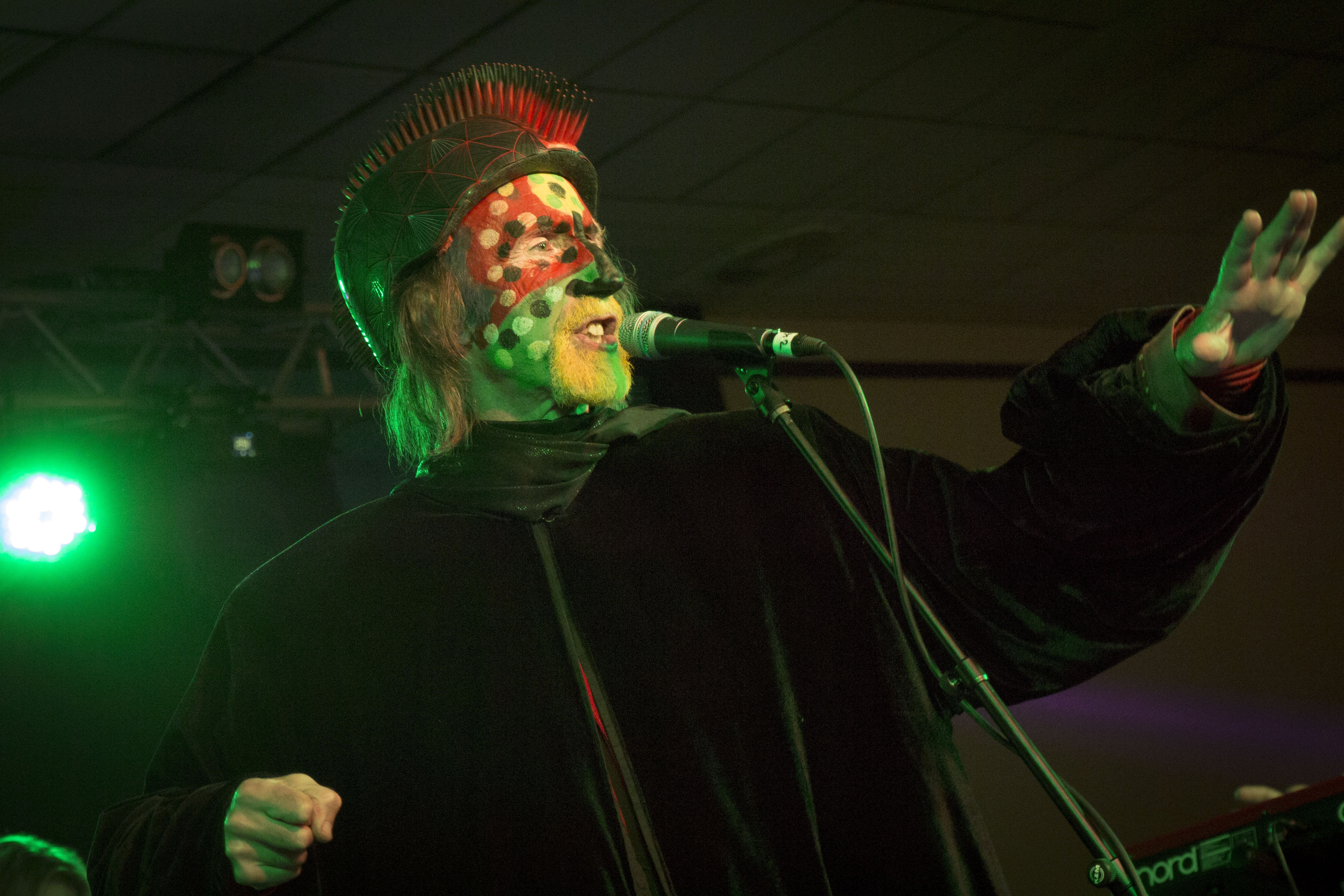
Arthur Brown was a major influence on Cooper. During live performances and in the promotional video, Brown performed the 1968 song "Fire" wearing black and white makeup (corpse paint) and a burning headpiece.

On seeing shock rock pioneer Arthur Brown performing his US number two hit "Fire" in 1968, Cooper states, "Can you imagine the young Alice Cooper watching that with all his make-up and hellish performance? It was like all my Halloweens came at once!" A 2014 article on Alice Cooper in The Guardian mentioned Arthur Brown and his flaming helmet, "British rock always was more theatrical than its US counterpart. Often this involved destruction or macabre gimmickry", with Cooper responding, "That's why most people thought we were British at first."

Evidence of Cooper's eclectic tastes in classic and contemporary rock music can be seen in the track listings of his radio show; in addition, when he appeared on the BBC Radio 2 program Tracks of My Years in September 2007, he listed his favorite tracks of all time as being: "19th Nervous Breakdown" (1966) by the Rolling Stones; "Turning Japanese" (1980) by the Vapors; "My Sharona" (1979) by the Knack; "Beds Are Burning" (1987) by Midnight Oil; "My Generation" (1965) by the Who; "Welcome to the Jungle" (1987) by Guns N' Roses; "Rebel Rebel" (1974) by David Bowie; "Over Under Sideways Down" (1966) by the Yardbirds; "Are You Gonna Be My Girl" (2003) by Jet; and "A Hard Day's Night" (1964) by the Beatles, and when he appeared on Desert Island Discs in 2010 he chose the songs "Happenings Ten Years Time Ago" by the Yardbirds; "I Get Around" by the Beach Boys; "I'm a Boy" by the Who; "Timer" by Laura Nyro; "21st Century Schizoid Man" by King Crimson; "Been Caught Stealing" by Jane's Addiction; "Work Song" by the Paul Butterfield Blues Band; and "Ballad of a Thin Man" by Bob Dylan.

Rob Zombie, former lead vocalist of White Zombie, claims his first "metal moment" was seeing Alice Cooper on Don Kirshner's Rock Concert. Zombie has also claimed to have been heavily influenced by Cooper's costumes. In a 1978 interview with Rolling Stone, Bob Dylan stated, "I think Alice Cooper is an overlooked songwriter."

In the foreword to Alice Cooper's CD retrospective box set The Life and Crimes of Alice Cooper, John Lydon of the Sex Pistols pronounced Killer (1971) as the greatest rock album of all time, and in 2002 Lydon presented his own tribute program to Cooper on BBC radio. Lydon told the BBC that "I know the words to every Alice Cooper song. The fact is, if you can call what I have a musical career, it all started with me miming to 'I'm Eighteen' on a jukebox."

The Flaming Lips are longtime Alice Cooper fans and used the bassline from "Levity Ball" (an early song from the 1969 release Pretties for You) for their song "The Ceiling Is Bending". They also covered "Sun Arise" for an Alice Cooper tribute album. (Cooper's version, which closes the album Love It to Death, was itself a cover of a Rolf Harris song.)

In 1999, Cleopatra Records released Humanary Stew: A Tribute to Alice Cooper featuring a number of contributions from rock and metal all-star collaborations, including Dave Mustaine of Megadeth, Roger Daltrey of the Who, Ronnie James Dio, Slash of Guns N' Roses, Bruce Dickinson of Iron Maiden, and Steve Jones of Sex Pistols. Sonic.net described it as "intriguing combinations of artists and material" while AllMusic noted "the novel approach will definitely hold interested listeners' attention".

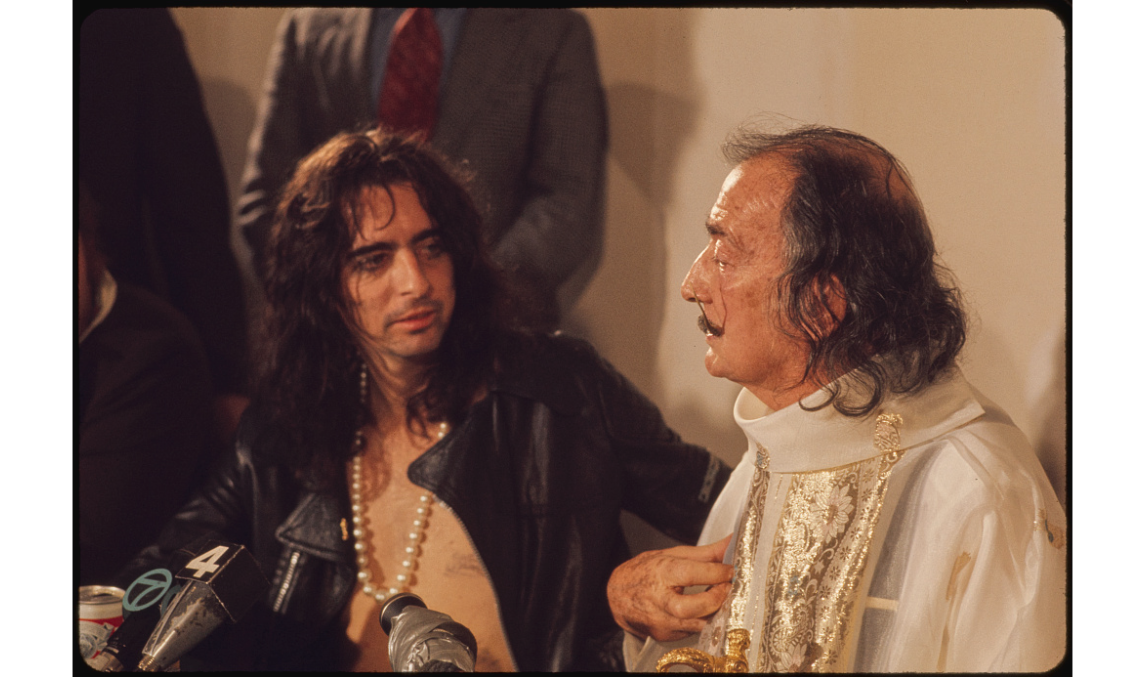
Cooper (left) and Salvador Dalí in 1973

Unlikely non-musician fans of Cooper have included comedian Groucho Marx and actress Mae West, who both reportedly saw the early shows as a form of vaudeville revue, and artist Salvador Dalí, who on attending a show in 1973 described it as being surreal, and made a hologram, First Cylindric Chromo-Hologram Portrait of Alice Cooper's Brain. (Note: A replica of the hologram can be seen at the Salvador Dalí Museum in St. Petersburg, Florida. Cooper and original band members Dennis Dunaway and Glen Buxton studied Dalí as art students at Cortez High School in Phoenix, Arizona, and the cover art of Cooper's eighth solo studio album DaDa (1983) features a slightly altered version of Dalí's painting Slave Market with the Disappearing Bust of Voltaire (1940).)

== Personal life ==
In the early 1970s, a story was widely reported that Leave It to Beaver actor Ken Osmond had become "rock star Alice Cooper". According to Cooper, the rumor began when a college newspaper editor asked him what kind of child he was, to which Cooper replied, "I was obnoxious, disgusting, a real Eddie Haskell," referring to the fictional character Osmond portrayed. However, the editor ended up reporting that Cooper was the real Haskell. Cooper later told the New Times: "It was the biggest rumor that ever came out about me. Finally, I got a T-shirt that said, 'No, I am not Eddie Haskell.' But people still believed it."

On June 20, 2005, ahead of his June–July 2005 tour, Cooper had a wide-ranging interview with interviewer of celebrities Andrew Denton for the Australian ABC TV's Enough Rope. Cooper discussed various issues during the talk, including the horrors of acute alcoholism and his subsequent cure, being a Christian, and his social and work relationship with his family. During the interview, Cooper remarked "I look at Mick Jagger and he's on an 18-month tour and he's six years older than me, so I figure, when he retires, I have six more years. I will not let him beat me when it comes to longevity."

Cooper frequently refers to himself in the third person as "Alice" as a way to distance himself from his stage persona.

=== Marriage and relationships ===
In the period when the Alice Cooper group was signed to Frank Zappa's Straight label, Miss Christine of the GTOs became Cooper's girlfriend. Miss Christine (real name Christine Frka), who had recommended Zappa to the group, died on November 5, 1972, of an overdose. (Note: Cooper describes how he fell for Miss Christine in his autobiography Me, Alice (1976).) Another long-time girlfriend of Cooper's was Cindy Lang, with whom he lived for several years.

After his separation from Lang, Cooper was briefly linked with actress Raquel Welch, although according to Dick Wagner, Cooper rejected Welch's advances. Cooper ended up marrying ballerina instructor and choreographer Sheryl Goddard, who performed in the Alice Cooper show from 1975 to 1982. They married on March 20, 1976. In November 1983, at the height of Cooper's alcoholism, Goddard filed for divorce, but by mid-1984, she and Cooper had reconciled. They have three children: daughters Sonora and Calico, and son Dashiell.

Cooper and his wife started Solid Rock foundation in 1995. The first of several teen centers opened in Phoenix, Arizona in 2012. Another opened in Mesa, Arizona in 2021. The centers offer vocational and arts training.

In a 2019 interview, Cooper said that he and his wife Sheryl have a death pact, wherein they will die at the same time, sparking a flurry of headlines. But Cooper clarified his comments, telling USA Today, "What I was meaning was that because we're almost always together, at home and on the road, that if something did happen to either of us, we'd most likely be together at the time. But neither of us has a suicide pact. We have a life pact."

=== Use of alcohol and other drugs ===
Since overcoming his own addiction to alcohol in the mid-1980s, Cooper has continued to help and counsel other rock musicians with addiction problems. "I've made myself very available to friends of mine – they're people who would call me late at night and say, 'Between you and me, I've got a problem.'" In 1986, thrash metal band Megadeth opened for Cooper on his US Constrictor tour. After noticing how Megadeth's band members abused alcohol and other drugs, Cooper personally approached the band to try to help them get clean. He has stayed close to lead vocalist Dave Mustaine, who considers Cooper to be his "godfather". In recognition of the work he has done in helping other addicts in the recovery process, in 2008 Cooper was given the MusiCares MAP Fund's Stevie Ray Vaughan Award at the fourth annual MusiCares MAP Fund benefit concert in Los Angeles.

=== Religion ===
Cooper is a born-again Christian. During an interview with Johnnie Walker on BBC Radio 2 in September 2007, Cooper said that he was not a Christian when he gave up drinking, but stated that he thanks God for "taking it away", saying, "I mean if He [God] can part the Red Sea and create the universe, He can certainly take alcoholism away from somebody." Cooper has stated he believes in the Old Testament “explicitly”, that there’s evolution “inside each species”, and that he believes God created the universe in 7 days. He has advocated for separating his persona from his real life, likening it to Jekyll & Hyde. He has stated he teaches Bible studies for Sunday school occasionally and that he reads the Bible every morning.

=== Politics ===
Throughout his career, Cooper's philosophy regarding politics is that politics should not be mixed with rock music. Cooper has usually kept his political views to himself, and in 2010 said, "I am extremely non-political. I go out of my way to be non-political. I'm probably the biggest moderate you know. When John Lennon and Harry Nilsson used to argue politics, I was sitting right in the middle of them, and I was the guy who was going 'I don't care.' When my parents would start talking politics, I would go in my room and put on the Rolling Stones or the Who as long as I could avoid politics. And I still feel that way."

On occasion, Cooper has spoken out against musicians who promote or opine on politics; for example, in the build-up to the 2004 presidential election, he told The Canadian Press that the rock stars campaigning for and touring on behalf of Democratic candidate John Kerry were committing "treason against rock n' roll". He added, upon seeing a list of musicians who supported Kerry, "If I wasn't already a Bush supporter, I would have immediately switched. Linda Ronstadt? Don Henley? Geez, that's a good reason right there to vote for Bush." (Note: On Zimbio's list of "Famous Republicans" (accessed May 8, 2012), Cooper is a Republican.) In December 2018, Cooper predicted that the next U.S. president would be "worse" than Donald Trump, while arguing that musicians talking politics to their fans was an "abuse of power".

Every four years since releasing his single "Elected" in 1972, Cooper has satirically run for president.

In 2023, Cooper made remarks against the transgender community and suggested women would be sexually assaulted in bathrooms if men were permitted access and called most instances of transgender identity a "fad", resulting in the loss of a cosmetics branding deal.

In a 2025 interview with The Times, Cooper stated that: "(America) got so 'woke' with the [Joe] Biden people, even they thought it was crazy. If a guy says to a coworker, 'I like your new dress,' that means he now gets fired? That's crazy. It got so over the top that whoever ran against the Democrats was going to win. America got sick of the stupidness and all I can say is, in a shooting war, you don't want a poodle; you want a pitbull."

=== Sports ===
Cooper is a fan of both the NHL's Detroit Red Wings and Arizona Coyotes. On February 18, 2012, the Coyotes gave away his bobblehead in a promotion for the first 10,000 fans for a game with the Dallas Stars. Cooper is a longtime baseball fan, supporting the Arizona Diamondbacks and Detroit Tigers. As a child, he dreamed of playing left field in the Tigers outfield alongside Tigers Hall of Famer Al Kaline. He has coached Little League baseball teams since his son played in the early 1990s. Cooper is also a fan of NBA basketball, supporting both the Detroit Pistons and the Phoenix Suns.

Cooper is an avid golfer and says that the sport played a major role in him overcoming his addiction to alcohol, and has even gone so far as to say that when he took up golf, it was a case of replacing one addiction with another. The importance that the game has had in his life is also reflected in the title to his 2007 autobiography, Alice Cooper, Golf Monster. Cooper, who has participated in a number of pro–am competitions, (Note: Details of the pro-am events Cooper has participated in can be found in Alice Cooper, Golf Monster.) plays the game six days a week, off a handicap of four. He also, through golf, enjoyed an unlikely friendship with country guitarist and singer Glen Campbell after they became neighbors, playing together "nearly every other day".

Cooper has also appeared in commercials for Callaway Golf equipment and was a guest of veteran British player and broadcaster Peter Alliss on A Golfer's Travels. He wrote the foreword to the Gary McCord book Ryder Cup and participated in the second All-Star Cup in Newport, Wales.

=== In popular culture ===
Cooper, a fan of The Simpsons, was asked to contribute a storyline for the September 2004 edition of Bongo Comics's Bart Simpson's Treehouse of Horror, a special Monsters of Rock issue that also included stories plotted by Gene Simmons, Rob Zombie and Pat Boone. The title of his song "Can't Sleep, Clowns Will Eat Me", from Dragontown, is a reference to the series.

In October 1979, Cooper was featured in the Marvel comic book Marvel Premiere, Volume 1, Number 50 loosely adapting his From the Inside studio album.

Cooper is also the subject of the "We're not worthy" meme, which was popularized during his cameo in Wayne's World with Mike Myers and Dana Carvey in 1992.

Cooper contributed his likeness and over 700 voice lines to Alice Cooper's Nightmare Castle, a pinball machine released in 2018 by Spooky Pinball that also features ten songs performed by Cooper. Only 500 machines were made.

At the Musical Instrument Museum of Phoenix, Cooper is honored with a dedicated exhibit showcasing props and instruments from his career, including one of the dummy heads used during the infamous guillotine stunt.

== Band members ==
Alice Cooper and musicians at Rockharz 2026

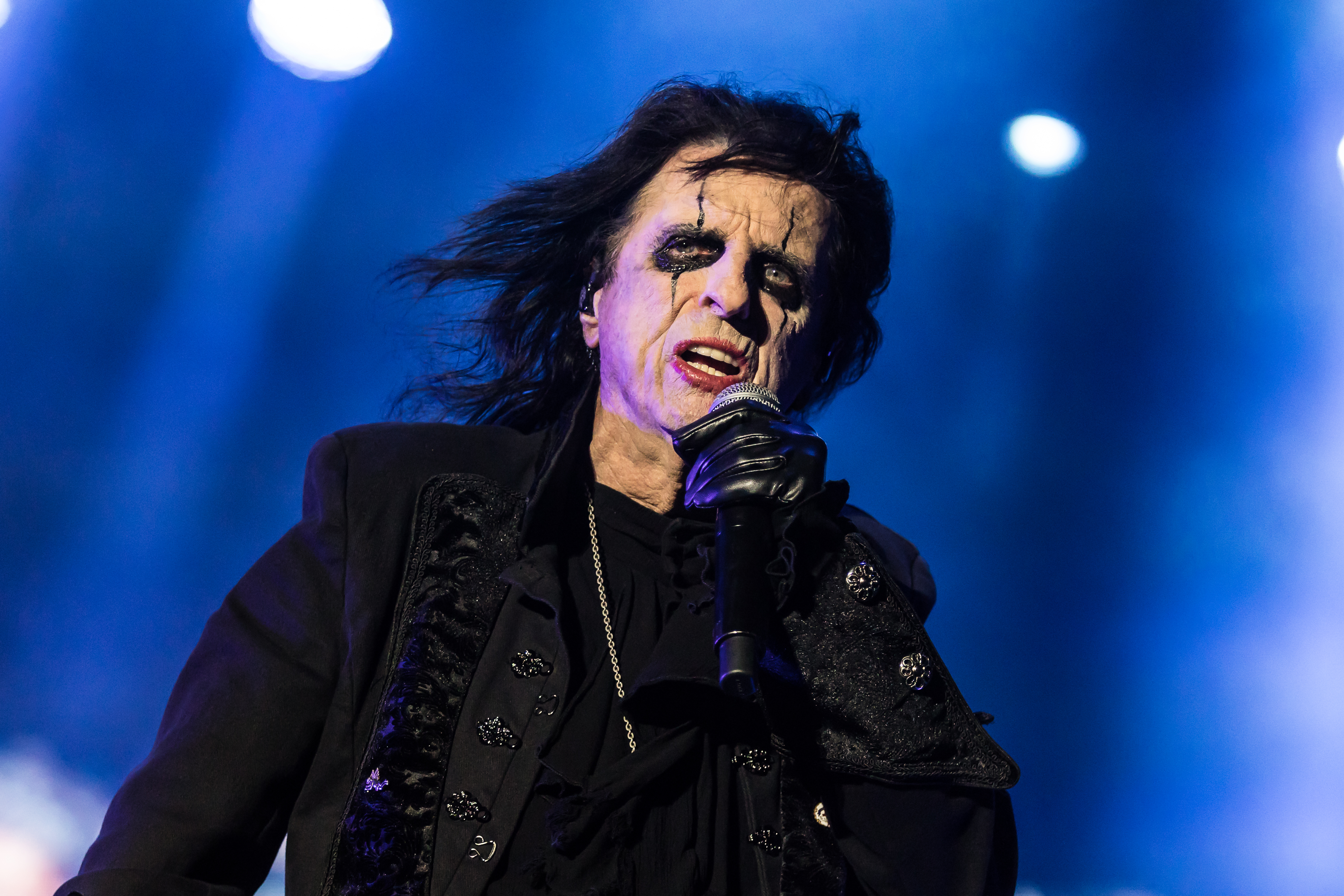
Alice Cooper, lead vocals, harmonica, guitars, percussion, synthesizer

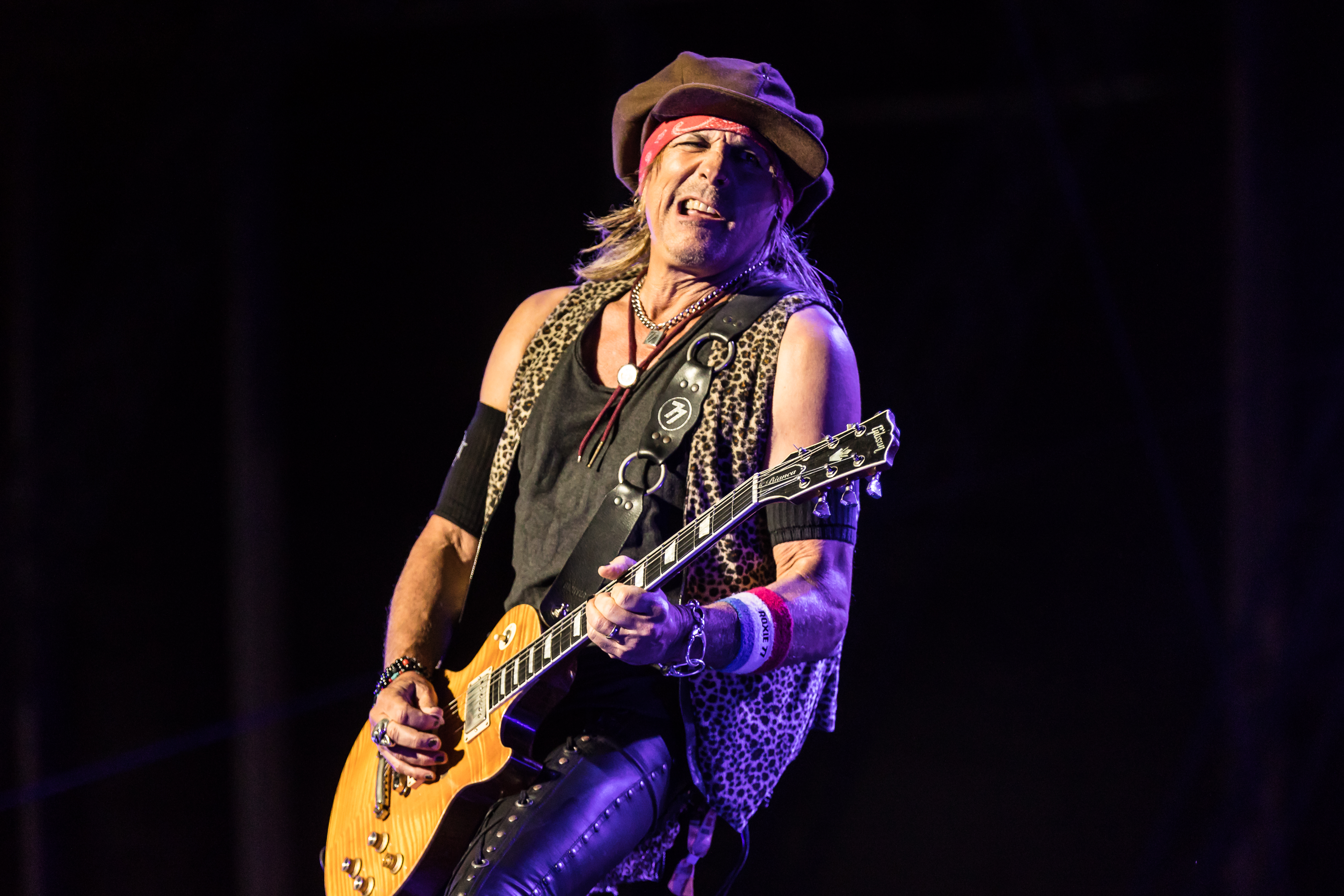
Ryan Roxie, guitars, backing vocals

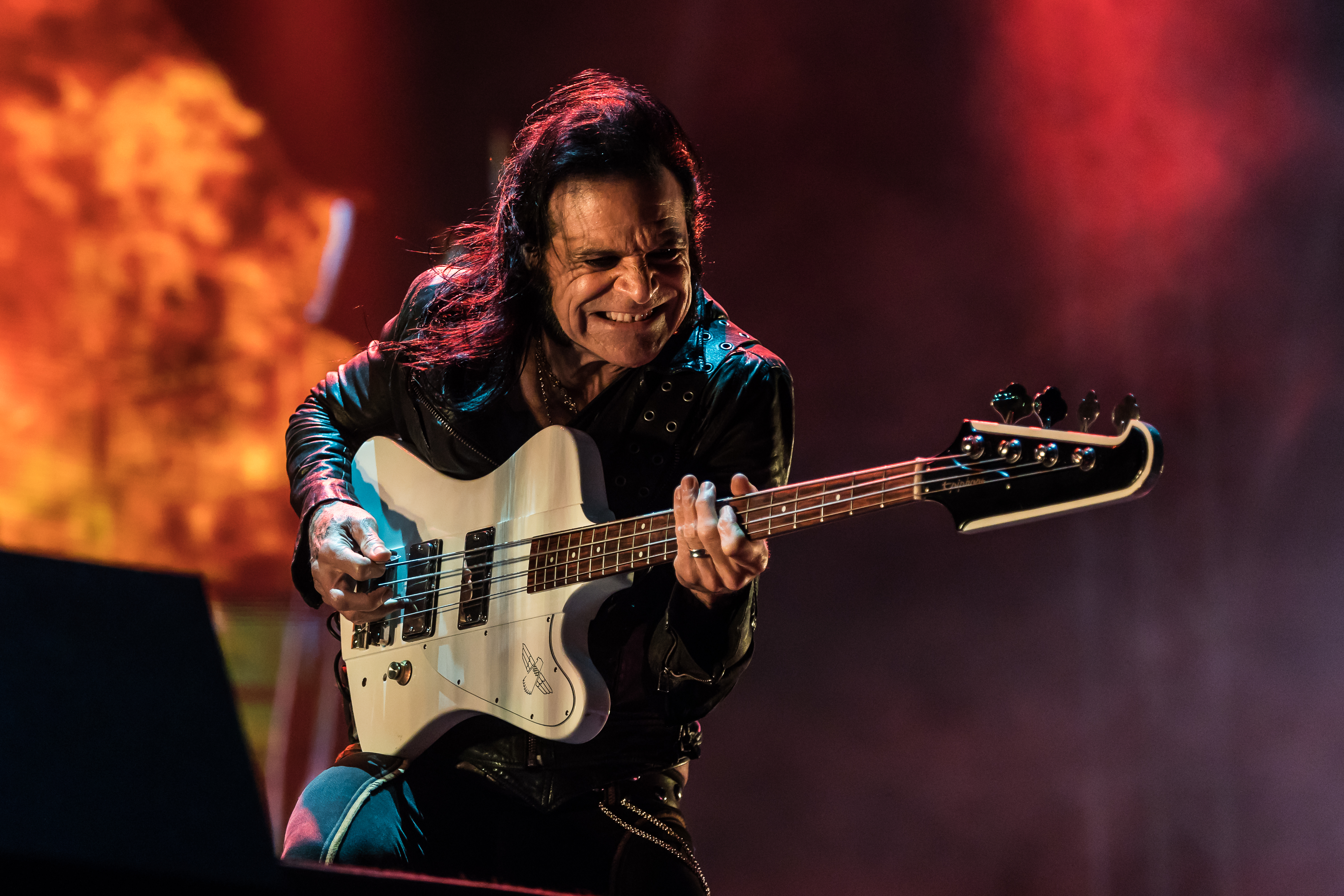
Chuck Garric, bass, backing vocals

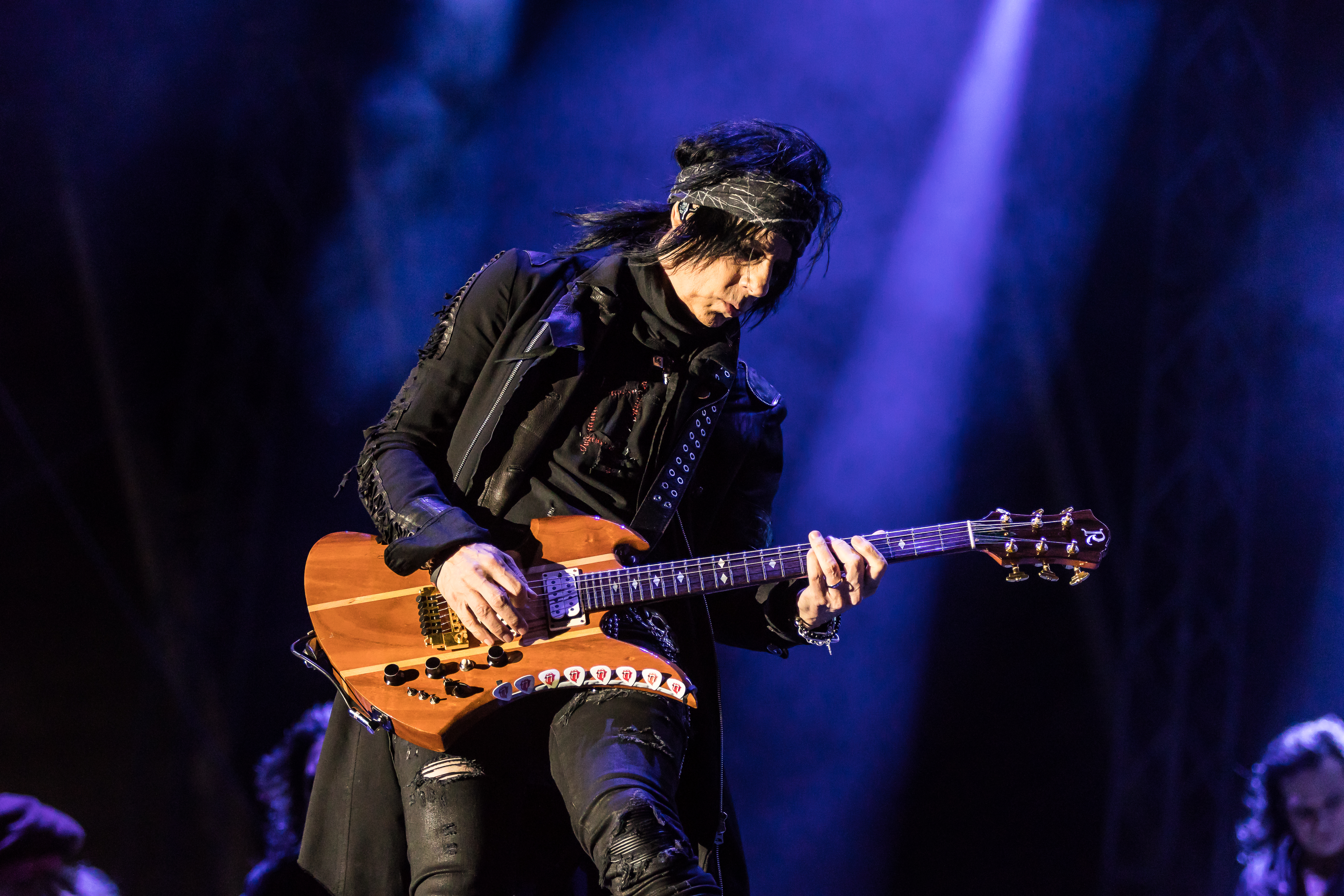
Tommy Henriksen, guitars, backing vocals

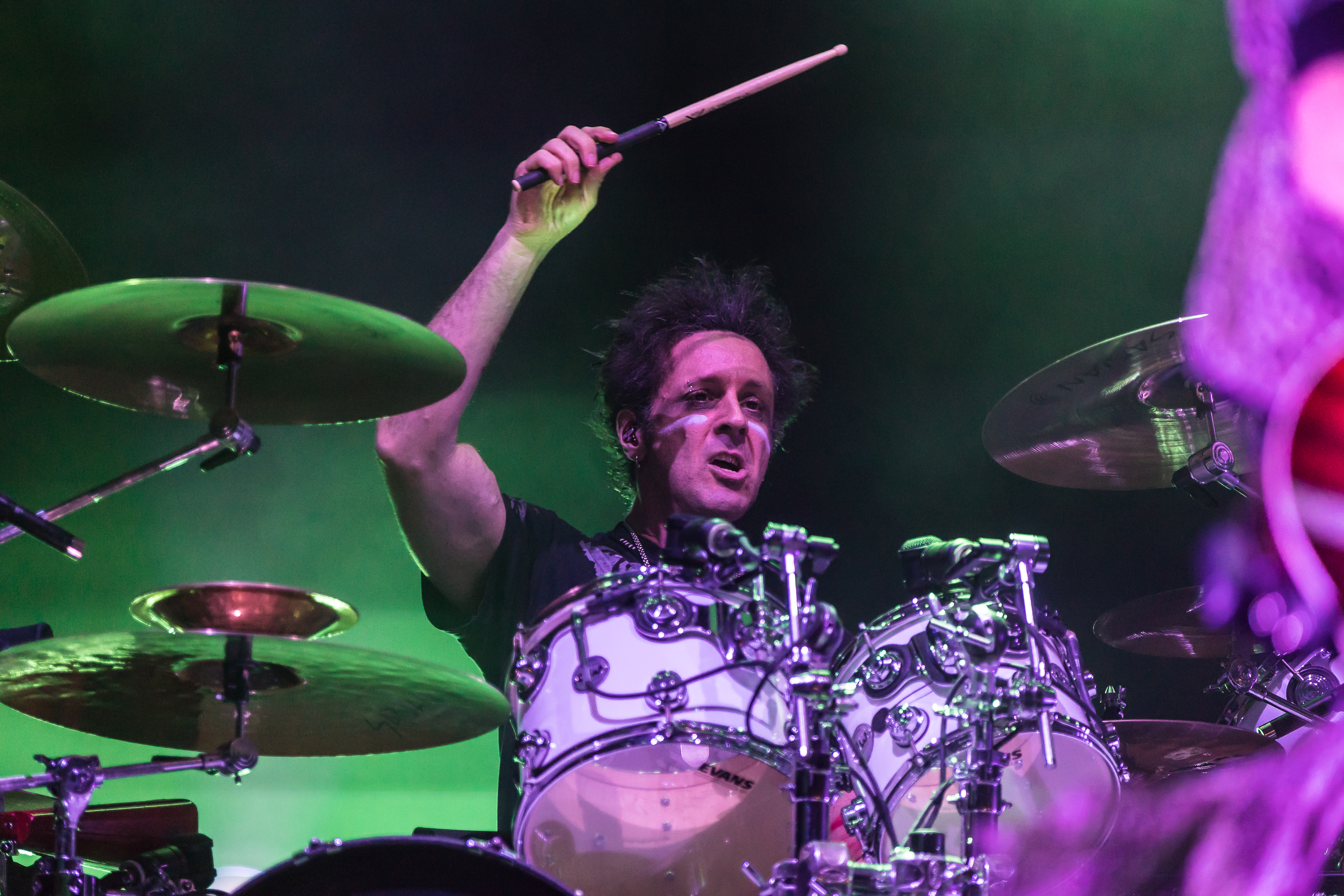
Glen Sobel, drums, percussion

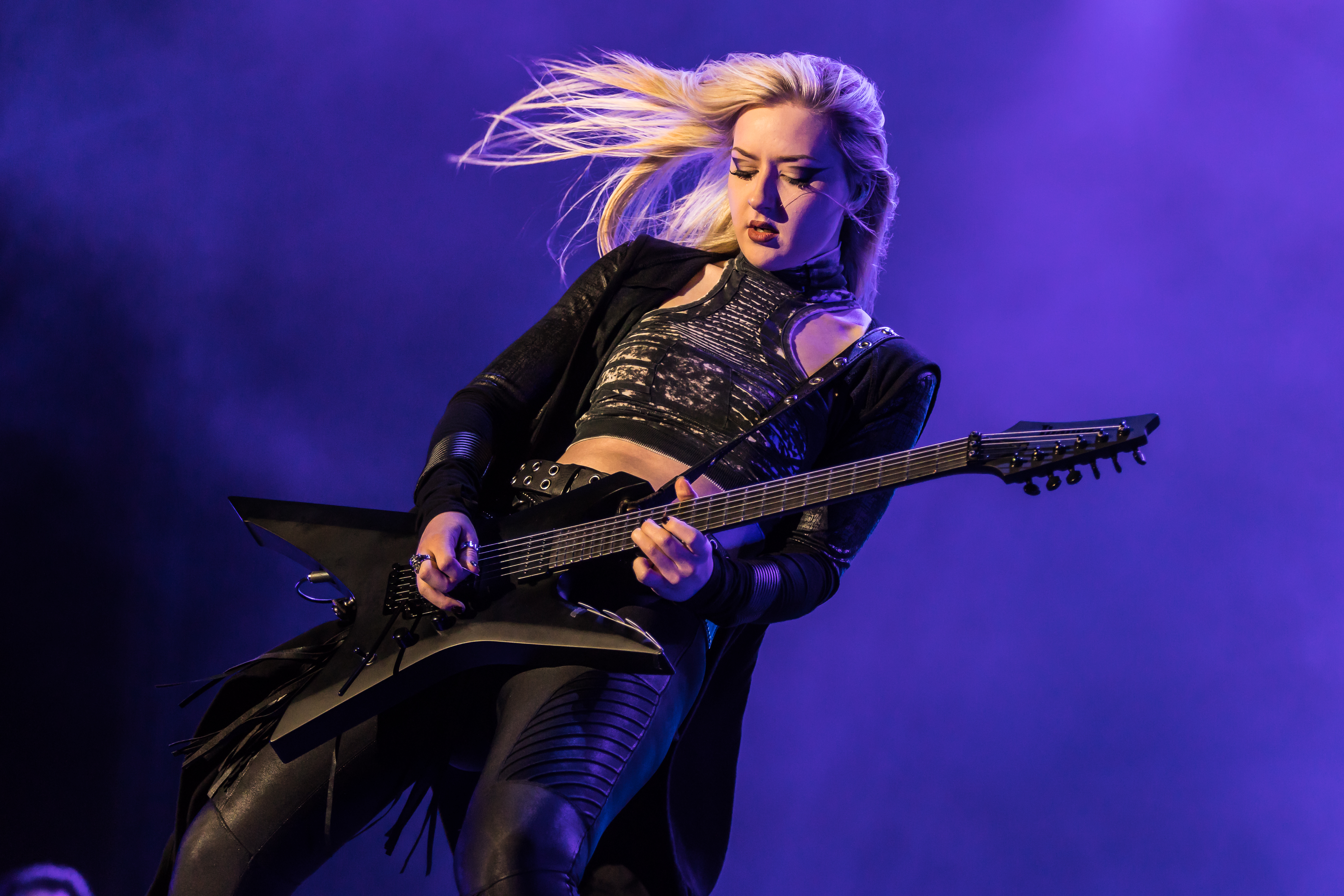
Anna Cara, guitars, backing vocals

Current members

- Alice Cooper – lead vocals, harmonica, guitars, percussion, synthesizer (1974–present)
- Ryan Roxie – guitars, backing vocals (1996–2006, 2012–present)
- Chuck Garric – bass, backing vocals (2002–present)
- Tommy Henriksen – guitars, backing vocals (2011–present)
- Glen Sobel – drums, percussion (2011–present)
- Anna Cara – guitars, backing vocals (2026–present)

== Discography ==
Band studio albums

- Pretties for You (1969)
- Easy Action (1970)
- Love It to Death (1971)
- Killer (1971)
- School's Out (1972)
- Billion Dollar Babies (1973)
- Muscle of Love (1973)
- The Revenge of Alice Cooper (2025)

Solo studio albums

- Welcome to My Nightmare (1975)
- Alice Cooper Goes to Hell (1976)
- Lace and Whiskey (1977)
- From the Inside (1978)
- Flush the Fashion (1980)
- Special Forces (1981)
- Zipper Catches Skin (1982)
- DaDa (1983)
- Constrictor (1986)
- Raise Your Fist and Yell (1987)
- Trash (1989)
- Hey Stoopid (1991)
- The Last Temptation (1994)
- Brutal Planet (2000)
- Dragontown (2001)
- The Eyes of Alice Cooper (2003)
- Dirty Diamonds (2005)
- Along Came a Spider (2008)
- Welcome 2 My Nightmare (2011)
- Paranormal (2017)
- Detroit Stories (2021)
- Road (2023)

== Tours ==
Concert tours

- Pretties for You Tour (1968–1970)
- Easy Action Tour (1970–1971)
- Love It to Death Tour (1971)
- Killer Tour (1971–1972)
- School's Out for Summer '72 Tour (1972)
- Billion Dollar Babies Tour (1973–1974)
- Welcome to My Nightmare Tour (1975–1977)
- King of the Silver Screen Tour (1977)
- School's Out for Summer '78 Tour (1978–1979)
- Madhouse Rocks Tour (1979)
- Flush the Fashion Tour (1980)
- Special Forces Tour (1981–1982)
- The Nightmare Returns Tour (1986–1987)
- Live in the Flesh Tour (1987–1988)
- Trash Tour (1989–1990)
- Operation Rock & Roll (with Judas Priest) (1991)
- Nightmare on Your Street Tour (1991)
- Hey Stoopid Tour (1991)
- South America '95 Tour (1995)
- School's Out for Summer '96 Tour (1996)
- School's Out for Summer '97 Tour (1997)
- Rock N' Roll Carnival Tour (1997–1998)
- New Year's Rotten Eve Tour '98 (1998)
- Life and Crimes of Alice Cooper Tour (1999)
- Brutal Planet Tour (2000–2001)
- British Rock Symphony Tour (2000)
- Descent into Dragontown Tour (2001–2002)
- Bare Bones Tour (2003)
- The Eyes of Alice Cooper Tour (2003–2004)
- Dirty Diamonds Tour (2005–2006)
- Psychodrama Tour (2007–2009)
- Theatre of Death Tour (2009–2010)
- No More Mr. Nice Guy Tour (2011–2012)
- Raise the Dead Tour (2012–2015)
- Spend the Night with Alice Cooper Tour (2016–2017)
- A Paranormal Evening with Alice Cooper Live Tour (2018)
- Ol' Black Eyes Is Back (2019–2020)
- Detroit Muscle Tour (2021–2022)
- Freaks on Parade (with Rob Zombie) (2023–2025)
- Too Close for Comfort (2023–2025)
- Judas Priest / Alice Cooper (with Judas Priest) (2025)
- Alice's Attic Tour (2025–2026)

Concert residencies

- The Alice Cooper Show (1977)
- Welcome to Our Nightmare (with Criss Angel) (2026)

== Accolades ==
=== Awards and nominations ===
Year	Nominee / work	Award association		Result	Ref(s)
Year	Nominee / work	Award ceremony / media	Category	Result	Ref(s)
1972	Alice Cooper (band)	Bravo magazine	International Band of the Year	Won	
1973	School's Out (album)	Grammy Awards	Best Recording Package	Nominated	(Note: Wilkes & Braun, Sound Packing Corp., and Robert Otter also received credit.)
1973	Alice Cooper (band)	NME Awards	World Stage Band	Won	
1974	Billion Dollar Babies (album)	Grammy Awards	Best Recording Package	Nominated	(Note: Pacific Eye & Ear also received credit.)
1974	Alice Cooper (band)	NME Awards	World Stage Band	Won	
1984	Alice Cooper: The Nightmare (video)	Grammy Awards	Best Video Album	Nominated	
1994	Alice Cooper	Foundations Forum	Lifetime Achievement	Won	
1996	Alice Cooper	Motor City Music Awards	Lifetime Achievement	Won	
1997	"Hands of Death (Burn Baby Burn)" (track)	Grammy Awards	Best Metal Performance	Nominated	
1997	Alice Cooper	Eyegore Awards	Eyegore Award	Won	
2001	Alice Cooper	International Horror Guild Awards	Living Legend	Won	
2006	Alice Cooper	Classic Rock Roll of Honour Awards	Living Legend	Won	
2007	Alice Cooper	Mojo magazine	Hero Award	Won	
2007	Alice Cooper	IEBA Live Music Industry Awards	Lifetime Achievement	Won	(Note: Alice Cooper's manager, Shep Gordon, also received an award.)
2007	Alice Cooper	Scream Awards	Scream Rock Immortal	Won	
2008	Alice Cooper	MusiCares MAP Fund Awards	Stevie Ray Vaughan Award	Won	
2009	Alice Cooper	Texas Frightmare Weekend	Lifetime Achievement	Won	
2011	Alice Cooper	Revolver Golden Gods Awards	Golden God	Won	
2011	Alice Cooper	Kerrang! Awards	Kerrang! Icon	Won	
2011	Alice Cooper	Eyegore Awards	Eyegore Award	Won	
2013	Alice Cooper	—N/a	Caesars Sold Out Award	Won	
2014	Supermensch: The Legend of Shep Gordon	Classic Rock Roll of Honour Awards	Film of the Year	Nominated	
2015	Alice Cooper	Kerrang! Awards	Kerrang! Legend	Won	
2015	Alice Cooper	Kerrang! Awards	Best Radio Show	Won	
2015	Welcome to My Nightmare	Classic Rock Roll of Honour Awards	Classic Album	Won	
2016	Nights with Alice Cooper	Kerrang! Awards	Best Radio Show	Won	
2017	Alice Cooper (band)	Music Biz	Outstanding Achievement Award	Won	
2017	"Live from the Astroturf" (single)	Making Vinyl Hollywood Packaging Awards	Best 45-RPM Package Award	Won	
2018	Paranormal	Detroit Music Awards Foundation	Outstanding National Major Label Recording	Nominated	
2018	"Paranoiac Personality"	Detroit Music Awards Foundation	Outstanding National Single	Nominated	
2018	The Sound of A	Detroit Music Awards Foundation	Outstanding Video / Major Budget	Nominated	
2018	Alice Cooper	The Rocks Awards	Best Worldwide Solo Artist	Won	
2019	Jesus Christ Superstar Live in Concert	Grammy Awards	Best Musical Theater Album	Nominated	
2019	Alice Cooper	The Rocks Awards	Best Worldwide Solo Artist	Nominated	
2019	Live from the Astroturf, Alice Cooper (film)	Phoenix Film Festival	Best Documentary Short Film	Won	
2019	Live from the Astroturf, Alice Cooper (film)	Dallas International Film Festival	Audience Award for Best Documentary	Won	
2019	Live from the Astroturf, Alice Cooper (film)	WorldFest-Houston International Film Festival	Documentary under 60 minutes	Won	
2019	Live from the Astroturf, Alice Cooper (film)	WorldFest-Houston International Film Festival	Editing	Won	
2019	Live from the Astroturf, Alice Cooper (film)	Northeast Mountain Film Festival	Best Film of 2019	Won	
2019	Live from the Astroturf, Alice Cooper (film)	Madrid International Film Festival	Best Editing of a Documentary	Nominated	
2019	Live from the Astroturf, Alice Cooper (film)	Madrid International Film Festival	Best Director of a Feature Documentary	Nominated	(Note: Steve Gaddis, director, also received credit.)
2019	Live from the Astroturf, Alice Cooper (film)	Madrid International Film Festival	Best Feature Documentary	Nominated	
2019	Live from the Astroturf, Alice Cooper (live album)	Making Vinyl Hollywood Packaging Awards	Best Record Store Day – Vinyl	Won	(Note: Good Records, a store co-owned by Chris Penn, also received credit.)
2020	"Breadcrumbs"	Detroit Music Awards Foundation	Outstanding National Major Label Recording	Won	

=== Others ===
Year	Title	Notes	Ref(s)
2002	Arizona Music & Entertainment Hall of Fame	Inductee	
2003	Hollywood Walk of Fame	Inducted with a star	
2004	Honorary Doctorate of Performing Arts degree	Honoree; Grand Canyon University in Phoenix, AZ	
2005	Michigan Rock and Roll Legends Hall of Fame	Inductee	
2007	KSHE-95 Real Rock Museum Hall of Fame	Inductee; Virtual museum	
2011	Rock and Roll Hall of Fame	Inductee with the original Alice Cooper band	
2012	Honorary Doctorate of Music degree	Honoree and Keynote Speaker; Musicians Institute in Los Angeles, CA	
2012	Arizona Chamber of Commerce and Industry Heritage Award	Honoree	
2025	Radio Hall of Fame	Honoree	

== See also ==
- List of Alice Cooper solo band members
- List of glam metal bands and artists
