= Killer (Alice Cooper album) =

Studio album by Alice Cooper
- Released: November 9, 1971
- Recorded: 1971
- Studios: RCA, Chicago
- Genres: Hard rock; glam rock; garage rock
- Length: 37:08
- Label: Warner Bros.
- Producer: Bob Ezrin

Alice Cooper chronology
Love It to Death (1971)	Killer (1971)	School's Out (1972)

Singles from Killer
- 1. "Under My Wheels" Released: December 1971; 2. "Be My Lover" Released: February 1972

Killer is the fourth studio album by American rock band Alice Cooper, released on November 9, 1971, by Warner Bros. Records. The album peaked at No. 21 on the Billboard 200 album chart, and the two singles "Under My Wheels" and "Be My Lover" reached No. 49 and No. 59 respectively on the Billboard Hot 100 chart.

== Songs ==
Cooper said in the liner notes of A Fistful of Alice (1997) and In the Studio with Redbeard, which spotlighted the Killer and Love It to Death (1971) albums, that the song "Desperado" was written about his friend Jim Morrison, who died the year this album was released. According to an NPR radio interview with Alice Cooper, "Desperado" was written about Robert Vaughn's character from the movie The Magnificent Seven (1960). "Halo of Flies" was, according to Cooper's liner notes in the compilation The Definitive Alice Cooper (2001), an attempt by the band to prove that they could perform King Crimson-like progressive rock suites, and was supposedly about a SMERSH-like organisation. "Desperado", along with "Under My Wheels" and "Be My Lover", has appeared on different compilation albums by Cooper. The song "Dead Babies" stirred up some controversy following the album's release, despite the fact that its lyrics conveyed an "anti-child abuse" message.

== Reception ==
=== Critical reception ===
Professional ratings
Review scores
Source	Rating
AllMusic	5/5 stars
Christgau's Record Guide	B−
Classic Rock	4.5/5 stars
Rolling Stone	(favorable)

Rolling Stone's Lester Bangs gave it a favorable review. He explained that "it brings all the elements of the band's approach to sound and texture to a totally integrated pinnacle that fulfills all the promise of their erratic first two albums" and that "each song on [the] album finds him in a different role in the endless movie he is projecting on them." He concluded by calling Alice Cooper "a strong band, a vital band, and they are going to be around for a long, long time."

Robert Christgau rated the album a B−, stating that "a taste for the base usages of hard rock rarely comes with a hit attached these days, much less 'surreal', 'theatrical', and let us not forget 'transvestite' trappings". However, he said that "[the album] falters after 'Under My Wheels' and 'Be My Lover', neither of them an 'I'm Eighteen' in the human outreach department."

AllMusic's Tim Sendra rated "Killer" five out of five stars. He stated that "it offers moments of sweaty rock & roll brilliance, oddball horror ballads, and garage rock freak outs, all wrapped up in a glammy, sleazy package" and that "Each and every track is handled with the same kind of unbridled glee that lets the listener know the band is having a blast; it's hard not to be swept along for the ride." He concluded by claiming that "Killer is the moment where they put all the pieces together and began to soar."

=== Live performances ===
Killer is the third-most-represented album in Alice Cooper's concert setlists behind Welcome to My Nightmare (1975) and Billion Dollar Babies (1973), accounting for 13.3 percent of the songs he has played live. Alongside Welcome to My Nightmare, it is one of only two Alice Cooper albums where every song has been played live, although "Yeah, Yeah, Yeah" has never been played since the end of the supporting Killer Tour, while "You Drive Me Nervous" was not played subsequent to the Killer Tour until 1999, and has never been performed since 2006. "Desperado" was performed only once prior to the Trash Tour in 1989, but has been frequent since.

=== Influence ===
John Lydon of the Sex Pistols and Public Image Ltd called Killer the greatest rock album of all time. Punk icons Jello Biafra and the Melvins covered the song "Halo of Flies" on their 2005 release Sieg Howdy!. Minneapolis rock band Halo of Flies took their name from this song as well. Rockabilly musicians Mojo Nixon and Skid Roper covered the song "Be My Lover" on their 1986 release Frenzy. Heavy metal band Iced Earth covered the song "Dead Babies" for their 2002 release Tribute to the Gods. Guns N' Roses (featuring Alice Cooper) covered the song "Under My Wheels" on the soundtrack of The Decline of Western Civilization Part II: The Metal Years (1988). Manic Street Preachers covered "Under My Wheels" in 1992.

== Track listing ==
Side one
No.	Title	Writer(s)	Length
1.	"Under My Wheels"	Michael Bruce; Dennis Dunaway; Bob Ezrin	2:51
2.	"Be My Lover"	Bruce	3:21
3.	"Halo of Flies"	Alice Cooper; Neal Smith; Dunaway; Bruce; Glen Buxton	8:22
4.	"Desperado"	Cooper; Bruce	3:30

Side two
No.	Title	Writer(s)	Length
5.	"You Drive Me Nervous"	Cooper; Bruce; Ezrin	2:28
6.	"Yeah, Yeah, Yeah"	Cooper; Bruce	3:39
7.	"Dead Babies"	Cooper; Smith; Buxton; Bruce; Dunaway	5:44
8.	"Killer"	Bruce; Dunaway	6:57
Total length:			37:08

== Personnel ==
Credits are adapted from the Killer liner notes.

Alice Cooper

- Alice Cooper – vocals; harmonica
- Glen Buxton – lead guitar
- Michael Bruce – rhythm guitar; keyboards; backing vocals
- Dennis Dunaway – bass guitar; backing vocals
- Neal Smith – drums; backing vocals

with:

- Bob Ezrin – keyboards
- Rick Derringer – additional guitar, "Under My Wheels" and "Yeah, Yeah, Yeah"

== Charts ==
Chart (1971–1972)	Peak position
Canada Top Albums/CDs (RPM)	11
Finnish Albums (The Official Finnish Charts)	22
US Billboard 200	21
UK Albums (Official Charts)	27

Chart (2023)	Peak position
Belgian Albums (Ultratop Wallonia)	113
Scottish Albums (Official Charts)	22
Swiss Albums (Schweizer Hitparade)	82

Chart (2025)	Peak position
Greek Albums (IFPI)	59

== Certifications ==
Region	Certification	Certified units/sales
United States (RIAA)	Platinum	1,000,000^{^}
^{^} Shipments figures based on certification alone.
