= Teenage Lament '74 =

Single by Alice Cooper

from the album Muscle of Love
- B-side: "Working Up a Sweat"
- Released: November 28, 1973
- Genre: Glam rock
- Length: 3:20
- Label: Warner Bros. 7762
- Songwriters: Alice Cooper, Neal Smith
- Producers: Jack Douglas, Jack Richardson

Alice Cooper singles chronology
"Halo of Flies" (1973)	"Teenage Lament '74" (1973)	"Muscle of Love" (1974)

"Teenage Lament '74" is a song by Alice Cooper. It was released on the album Muscle of Love, and was written by Cooper and Neal Smith.

The song reached #12 on the UK Singles Chart in 1974. The song also reached #16 on the Ireland chart, #43 on Germany's Media Control Chart, #48 on the Billboard Hot 100, and #89 on Australia's ARIA chart.

Record World said that it has "clever lyrics throughout and Alice's vocals never sounded better."

The song was produced by Jack Douglas and Jack Richardson.

Liza Minnelli, Ronnie Spector, and the Pointer Sisters provided backing vocals for the song.

== Other versions ==
- Big Country released a version of the song on their 2001 covers album, Under Cover.
- Tyla released a version of the song on the 1993 tribute album, Welcome to Our Nightmare: A Tribute to Alice Cooper.
