= Under My Wheels =

Single by Alice Cooper

from the album Killer
- B-side: "Desperado"
- Released: December 1971
- Genre: Hard rock; blues rock
- Length: 2:51
- Label: Warner Bros.
- Songwriters: Michael Bruce; Dennis Dunaway; Bob Ezrin
- Producer: Bob Ezrin

Alice Cooper singles chronology
"Caught in a Dream" (1971)	"Under My Wheels" (1971)	"Be My Lover" (1972)

"Under My Wheels" is a song by American rock band Alice Cooper, released in 1971 as the first single from their fourth studio album Killer. The song was written by Michael Bruce, Dennis Dunaway and Bob Ezrin. The song peaked at #59 on the Billboard Hot 100 in the US.

The Alice Cooper band performed the song on the British TV show The Old Grey Whistle Test in 1971. They also performed it in West Germany on the show Beat-Club. Since then, "Under My Wheels" has been a staple of Cooper's live shows. It is the third most-performed song in his catalogue behind only "School’s Out" and "I’m Eighteen". It is tied for third-place with "Billion Dollar Babies". Cooper has performed "Under My Wheels" on every tour he has undertaken since the single's release.

It was re-recorded in 1988 by Cooper and Guns N' Roses, with the vocals performed as a duet between Cooper and Axl Rose, for the soundtrack of The Decline of Western Civilization Part II: The Metal Years on Slash Records, which came out after the release of the Raise Your Fist and Yell (1987) album, with its supporting US tour being opened by Guns N' Roses. Cooper would later make a guest appearance on the song "The Garden" from the group's 1991 album Use Your Illusion I.

== Album appearances ==
- Killer – 1971
- Alice Cooper's Greatest Hits – 1974 (as a remixed version)
- The Beast of Alice Cooper – 1989
- The Life and Crimes of Alice Cooper – 1999
- Mascara & Monsters: The Best of Alice Cooper – 2001
- School's Out and Other Hits – 2004

== Cover versions ==
Joe Elliott, Phil Collen, Bob Kulick, Chuck Wright, Pat Torpey and Clarence Clemons covered the song for the 1999 tribute album Humanary Stew: A Tribute to Alice Cooper.

A live cover version by Manic Street Preachers was included on the CD single of "Motorcycle Emptiness".

It was also covered by Hanoi Rocks on their album All Those Wasted Years.

The song can be heard sung by Dave 'on the radio' in the background during the chase segment of the Megadeth remastered version of the song "502".

In 1991, the song was covered by Gumball for the Sub Pop Singles Club.

Foo Fighters - with Chris Shiflett on lead vocals - performed the song on the Concrete and Gold tour 2017/2018.
