= Toronto Rock 'n' Roll Revival 1969, Volume IV =

Live album by Alice Cooper
- Released: Toronto Rock 'n' Roll Revival 1969, Volume IV: 1982; Nobody Likes Us: 2012
- Recorded: 1969
- Genres: Psychedelic rock; hard rock
- Length: Toronto Rock 'n' Roll Revival 1969, Volume IV: 25:20; Nobody Likes Us: 75:48
- Labels: Toronto Rock 'n' Roll Revival 1969, Volume IV: Accord; Nobody Likes Us: Applebush
- Producer: Uncredited

Alice Cooper chronology
Zipper Catches Skin (1982)	Toronto Rock 'n' Roll Revival 1969, Volume IV (1969)	DaDa (1983)

Alternative cover

Professional ratings
Review scores
Source	Rating
AllMusic	1.5/5 stars

Toronto Rock 'n' Roll Revival 1969, Volume IV is a live album of the Alice Cooper Band. Due to the fact that the recording is owned by a private party, it is unauthorized but not a bootleg. It features Alice Cooper's infamous chicken-throwing performance at the Toronto Rock and Roll Revival festival at Varsity Stadium in Toronto on September 13, 1969, and showcases the early psychedelic music style of Cooper and his band in support of their first album release, Pretties for You.

Although the album was originally released on vinyl in 1982, it has been re-released many times over the years on vinyl, cassette, CD, and digital download by various record labels under different titles, using alternative track titles and track orders. Many of these re-releases additionally include two 1964 studio tracks by Ronnie Hawkins, falsely credited on the album to Alice Cooper.

In 1996, Brian Nelson, Alice Cooper's personal assistant, said concerning this releases: "The rights to the recording were sold by Alice's management at the time of the recording to a third party. That party has licensed out the rights to the recording many times to various companies. Alice Cooper do not make a penny from it. My theory is that the two non-Alice songs somehow wound up on the original master tape. The distributors not knowing and not particularly caring, put the album out of the tape as is. When the album was pressed again later by other companies, they didn't bother to check if all the songs were Alice or not. They would have no particular reason to."

In 2014, the label Applebush released another version of this concert with the title Nobody Likes Us under the moniker of The Alice Cooper Group. This is the first known CD release to feature the whole concert speed corrected, correct song titles, and chronological track listing. Guitarist Michael Bruce advised how to name and to arrange the titles correctly. The sound quality is also better than on all of the other releases. As a bonus it also contains recordings of a concert at the Avalon Ballroom in San Francisco on March 30, 1969, but the sound quality of that show is poor.

== Track listing ==
=== Track listing of completely correct release Nobody Likes Us ===
No.	Title	Writer(s)	Additional information	Length
1.	"Intro... No Longer Umpire (Live)"	Alice Cooper, Glen Buxton, Michael Bruce, Dennis Dunaway, Neal Smith	Recorded in Toronto (original version on Pretties for You)	4:23
2.	"Lay Down and Die, Goodbye (Live)"	Cooper, Buxton, Bruce, Dunaway, John Speer	Recorded in Toronto (original version on Nazz single Lay Down and Die, Goodbye)	5:01
3.	"Fields of Regret (Live)"	Cooper, Buxton, Bruce, Dunaway, Smith	Recorded in Toronto (original version on Pretties for You)	6:32
4.	"Nobody Likes Me (Live)"	Cooper, Buxton, Bruce, Dunaway, Smith	Recorded in Toronto (original version on The Life and Crimes of Alice Cooper)	3:23
5.	"Don't Blow Your Mind (Live) (Neal Smith Solo, Prisoner, Animal Pyjamas, Don't Blow Your Mind (Reprise))"	Cooper, Dunaway, Smith	Recorded in Toronto (original version on Spiders single Don't Blow Your Mind)	20:56
6.	"No Longer Umpire (Live)"	Cooper, Buxton, Bruce, Dunaway, Smith	Bonus Track; Recorded in San Francisco (original version on Pretties for You)	2:38
7.	"Reflected (Live)"	Cooper, Buxton, Bruce, Dunaway, Smith	Bonus Track; Recorded in San Francisco (original version on Pretties for You)	3:51
8.	"10 Minutes Before the Worm (Live)"	Cooper, Buxton, Bruce, Dunaway, Smith	Bonus Track; Recorded in San Francisco (original version on Pretties for You)	1:40
9.	"Swing Low, Sweet Cherio (Live)"	Cooper, Buxton, Bruce, Dunaway, Smith	Bonus Track; Recorded in San Francisco (original version on Pretties for You)	6:24
10.	"B.B. on Mars (Live)"	Cooper, Buxton, Bruce, Dunaway, Smith	Bonus Track; Recorded in San Francisco (original version on Pretties for You)	1:39
11.	"Fields of Regret (Live)"	Cooper, Buxton, Bruce, Dunaway, Smith	Bonus Track; Recorded in San Francisco (original version on Pretties for You)	6:23
12.	"Nobody Likes Me (Live)"	Cooper, Buxton, Bruce, Dunaway, Smith	Bonus Track; Recorded in San Francisco (original version on The Life and Crimes of Alice Cooper)	3:18
13.	"Don't Blow Your Mind (Live)"	Cooper, Dunaway	Bonus Track; Recorded in San Francisco (original version on Spiders single Don't Blow Your Mind)	9:33
Total length:				75:48

=== Track listing of first release Toronto Rock 'n' Roll Revival 1969, Volume IV ===
No.	Title	Writer(s)	Additional information	Length
1.	"Ain't That Just Like a Woman"	Claude Demetrius, Fleecie Moore	Studio recording performed by Ronnie Hawkins, not by Alice Cooper; recorded at Hallmark Studios in Toronto in late 1964 (Louis Jordan and His Tympany Five cover)	2:36
2.	"Painting a Picture (Live)"	Alice Cooper, Glen Buxton, Michael Bruce, Dennis Dunaway, Neal Smith	Recorded in Toronto proper song title: "No Longer Umpire"	2:09
3.	"Group Instrumental (Live)"	Cooper, Buxton, Bruce, Dunaway, John Speer	Recorded in Toronto proper song title: "Lay Down and Die, Goodbye (Part 1)"; named "An Instrumental", "A.C. Instrumental", "AC Instrumental", "Alice Cooper Instrumental", "A. Cooper Instrumental", "Instrumental" or "For Alice" on other releases	2:31
4.	"I've Written Home to Mother (Live)"	Cooper, Buxton, Bruce, Dunaway, Speer	Recorded in Toronto proper song title: "Lay Down and Die, Goodbye (Part 2)"	2:01
5.	"Freak out Song (Live)"	Cooper, Dunaway	Recorded in Toronto proper song title: "Don't Blow Your Mind"; named "Freak out" on some releases	3:50
6.	"Goin' to the River"	Dave Bartholomew, Antoine "Fats" Domino Jr.	Studio recording performed by Ronnie Hawkins, not by Alice Cooper; recorded at Hallmark Studios in Toronto in late 1964 (Fats Domino cover)	2:09
7.	"Nobody Likes Me (Live)"	Cooper, Buxton, Bruce, Dunaway, Smith	Recorded in Toronto song title is correct	3:18
8.	"Science Fiction (Live)"	Cooper, Buxton, Bruce, Dunaway, Smith	Recorded in Toronto proper song title: "Fields of Regret"	6:46
Total length:				25:20
