= Live from the Astroturf =

- 2022 release cover

Live album by Alice Cooper
- Released: November 23, 2018
- Recorded: October 6, 2015
- Venue: Good Records, Dallas, Texas, U.S.
- Genre: Hard rock
- Length: 38:44
- Label: Good

Alice Cooper chronology
Paranormal (2017)	Live from the Astroturf (2018)	Detroit Stories (2021)

Live from the Astroturf is the 12th live album by rock group Alice Cooper, originally released through Good Records on November 23, 2018, before receiving a worldwide release from Earmusic on September 30, 2022. It features eight songs performed by the original line-up of the Alice Cooper band (Neal Smith, Dennis Dunaway, and Michael Bruce, with Ryan Roxie filling in for the late Glen Buxton) recorded on October 6, 2015, at Good Records in Dallas, Texas.

In addition to the live concert album, a documentary film titled Live from the Astroturf, Alice Cooper, produced by Christopher Todd Penn and directed by Steven Gaddis, was made that featured the concert, its inception and events leading up to it, and a Q&A session with original Alice Cooper group members that took place following the concert. The film premiered at the Phoenix Film Festival April 4 to 14, 2019, in the group's birthplace of Phoenix, Arizona, where it was awarded Best Documentary Short Feature; the four surviving original members of Alice Cooper were in attendance at the World Premiere event on April 5, 2019. The film also was the Official Selection to be shown in the Detroit Freep Film Festival, the Dallas International Film Festival, and the Northeast Mountain Film Festival.

== Background ==
On October 6, 2015, fans attending a book signing at Good Records, Dallas, Texas, in support of bassist Dennis Dunaway's autobiography, Snakes! Guillotines! Electric Chairs!, were treated to a surprise reunion by the four surviving members of the original Alice Cooper group.

Alice Cooper, Dennis Dunaway, Neal Smith and Michael Bruce were joined by Ryan Roxie (in place of the late Glen Buxton) to perform an intimate set of eight hits in front of 200 people ("Caught in a Dream" without Alice and featuring Michael Bruce on vocals; "Be My Lover"; "Eighteen"; "Is It My Body"; "No More Mr Nice Guy"; "Under My Wheels"; "School's Out"; "Elected"). This marked the first performance by the surviving members since they were inducted into the Rock and Roll Hall of Fame in 2011. It was also the longest time that they had spent together on stage since the group broke up in 1974.

== Release ==
The performance was initially released on Record Store Day in 2016 as a two track 7" 45 vinyl release called Live from the Astroturf (the single taking its name from the pink astroturf located on the stage where the band performed). The two tracks included were "Eighteen" and "(Is It My) Body", which featured together on the original single of Eighteen in 1970. The release was limited to 2,700 units worldwide.

A 12" vinyl release featuring the full eight-song set list was released on Record Store Day in 2018, 50 years on from the renaming of 'The Nazz' to 'Alice Cooper'. The release was limited to 5,000 units worldwide.

Limited cassette and 8-track releases (100 units each) were also produced.

The wide release of a repackaged version of the album in September 2022 came in a variety of formats, including several colors of vinyl each with a DVD, as well as a CD and Blu-ray edition. It includes the band talking and joking between songs as "banter" interludes as well as an instrumental of "Desperado" for a total of 17 tracks.

== Track listing ==
Live from the Astroturf 2022 release track listing
No.	Title	Length
1.	"The Eighth Wonder of the World..." (intro)	0:59
2.	"Caught in a Dream"	3:19
3.	"Be My Lover"	3:30
4.	"Whatever He's Doing It's Illegal" (banter)	0:27
5.	"I'm Eighteen"	3:33
6.	"We Haven't Done This One in About, What, 40 Years?" (banter)	0:25
7.	"Is It My Body"	2:40
8.	"Threatened for a Month" (banter)	0:40
9.	"No More Mr. Nice Guy"	3:08
10.	"I Guess Things Are Getting Better for You" (banter)	0:53
11.	"Under My Wheels"	3:00
12.	"It's a Dangerous Place to Be" (banter)	1:15
13.	"School's Out"	3:19
14.	"More Fun Than It's Supposed to Be" (banter)	3:17
15.	"Elected"	3:59
16.	"School's Not Over Until You Vote" (outro)	0:53
17.	"Desperado" (instrumental bonus track; theme from the documentary film Live from the Astroturf, Alice Cooper)	3:27
Total length:		38:44

== Charts ==
Chart performance for Live from the Astroturf
Chart (2022)	Peak position
Belgian Albums (Ultratop Flanders)	191
Belgian Albums (Ultratop Wallonia)	120
German Albums (Offizielle Top 100)	21
Swiss Albums (Schweizer Hitparade)	39
