= Reflected (song) =

- 7" 45 RPM single

Single by Alice Cooper

from the album Pretties for You
- B-side: "Living"
- Released: May 19, 1969
- Recorded: 1968
- Genre: Psychedelic rock
- Length: 3:17 (album version); 2:59 (single version)
- Label: Straight
- Songwriters: Vincent Furnier, Glen Buxton, Michael Bruce, Dennis Dunaway, Neal Smith
- Producer: Jack Richardson

Alice Cooper singles chronology
| "Reflected" (1969) | "Shoe Salesman" (1970) |

"Reflected" is a song by American rock band Alice Cooper, released in 1969 as the only single from their debut album Pretties for You. It preceded the album, which was released on June 25, and failed to chart.

== Composition ==
Written by all five members of the band, "Reflected" comments on the false lure of Hollywood glitz. Alice Cooper called the lyrics "stupid". "It was that fake, quasi-spiritual 60s thing. We didn't know what we were talking about."

== Legacy ==
The band performed the song during a party scene in the film Diary of a Mad Housewife (1970).

Both the riff and part of the melody were recycled for "Elected", which appeared on their 1973 album Billion Dollar Babies.

== Track listing ==
| No. | Title | Length |
|---|---|---|
| 1. | "Reflected" | 2:50 |
| 2. | "Living" | 2:59 |

== Album appearances ==
- Pretties for You – 1969
- School Days: The Early Recordings – 1973
- The Life and Crimes of Alice Cooper – 1999

== Personnel ==
- Alice Cooper – vocals, harmonica
- Glen Buxton – lead guitar
- Michael Bruce – rhythm guitar, backing vocals
- Dennis Dunaway – bass guitar
- Neal Smith – drums
