= School Days: The Early Recordings =

Compilation album by Alice Cooper
- Released: 1973
- Recorded: 1968–1970
- Genre: Rock, garage rock, psychedelic rock
- Length: 71:15
- Label: originally: Straight, Enigma Retro this compilation: Warner Brothers
- Producer: Alice Cooper/David Briggs

Alice Cooper chronology
Billion Dollar Babies (1973)	School Days: The Early Recordings (1973)	Muscle of Love (1973)

School Days: The Early Recordings is a compilation album by Alice Cooper, released in 1973. It contains the band's first two albums, Pretties for You and Easy Action. The original albums were released by Straight Records, but since Warner signed the band later on, they got the rights to re-release the material. The album was not released in the U.S.

== Track listing ==
All songs were written by Alice Cooper, Glen Buxton, Michael Bruce, Dennis Dunaway and Neal Smith.

Pretties for You

1. "Titanic Overture" – 1:12
2. "10 Minutes Before the Worm" – 1:39
3. "Sing Low, Sweet Cheerio" – 5:42
4. "Today Mueller" – 1:48
5. "Living" – 3:12
6. "Fields of Regret" – 5:44
7. "No Longer Umpire" – 2:02
8. "Levity Ball" (Live at the Cheetah) – 4:39
9. "B.B. on Mars" – 1:17
10. "Reflected" – 3:17
11. "Apple Bush" – 3:08
12. "Earwings to Eternity" – 1:19
13. "Changing Arranging" – 3:03

Easy Action

1. "Mr. and Misdemeanor" – 3:05
2. "Shoe Salesman" – 2:38
3. "Still No Air" – 2:32
4. "Below Your Means" – 6:41
5. "Return of the Spiders" – 4:33
6. "Laughing at Me" – 2:12
7. "Refrigerator Heaven" – 1:54
8. "Beautiful Flyaway" – 3:02
9. "Lay Down and Die, Goodbye" – 7:36
