= I'm Eighteen =

Single by Alice Cooper

from the album Love It to Death
- B-side: "Is It My Body"
- Released: November 11, 1970 (US): April 23, 1971 (UK)
- Recorded: 1970
- Genre: Hard rock; glam rock
- Length: 2:59
- Label: Straight; Warner Bros.
- Songwriters: Alice Cooper; Michael Bruce; Glen Buxton; Dennis Dunaway; Neal Smith
- Producers: Bob Ezrin; Jack Richardson

Alice Cooper singles chronology
"Shoe Salesman" (1970)	"I'm Eighteen" (1970)	"Caught in a Dream" (1971)

Audio sample
- file; help

"I'm Eighteen", or simply "Eighteen", is a song by American rock band Alice Cooper, first released as a single in November 1970 backed with "Is It My Body". It was the band's first top-forty success—peaking at number 21—and convinced Warner Bros. that Alice Cooper had the commercial potential to release an album. The song and its B-side feature on the band's first major-label album Love It to Death (1971), their third album overall.

An arpeggiated guitar riff and aggressive vocal performance power the anthem. The lyrics describe the anxiety that comes with being "in the middle" of childhood and adulthood. It began as an eight-minute jam that young Canadian producer Bob Ezrin persuaded the band into tightening into a tight three-minute rocker.

The song was the band's breakthrough, and left a considerable influence on hard rock, punk, and heavy metal. Joey Ramone wrote his first song for the Ramones based on the chords to "I'm Eighteen", and John Lydon auditioned for the Sex Pistols by miming to the song. Bands such as thrash metalers Anthrax have covered the song, and Kiss settled out of court for plagiarism of the song over the 1998 track "Dreamin'".

== Background ==
The Alice Cooper band formed in the mid-1960s and adopted its name in 1968, presenting an origin story that it came from a 17th-century witch whose name they learned from a session with a ouija board. The group's first two albums, Pretties for You (1969) and Easy Action (1970), appeared on Frank Zappa's Straight Records label, and failed to find an audience. The band relocated to Detroit and found itself in the midst of a music scene populated with the hard-driving rock of the MC5, the stage-diving Iggy Pop with the Stooges, and the theatricality of George Clinton's Parliament and Funkadelic. The Alice Cooper band incorporated these influences into a tight hard-rock sound coupled with an outrageous, theatrical live show. Zappa sold Straight Records to Warner Bros. in 1970 for $50,000.

While at the Strawberry Fields Festival in Canada in April 1970, band manager Shep Gordon contacted producer Jack Richardson, who sent nineteen-year-old Bob Ezrin in his place. Ezrin initially turned down working with the band, but changed his mind when he saw them perform at Max's Kansas City in New York City the following October. Ezrin was impressed with the band's audience-participation rock-theater performance and the cult-like devotion of the band's fans, who dressed up and knew the lyrics and actions to the music. Ezrin returned to Toronto to convince Richardson to take on the band; Richardson did not want to work directly with such a group but agreed on condition that Ezrin took the lead.

The band and Bob Ezrin did pre-production for the album in Pontiac, Michigan, in November and December 1970. Ezrin, with his classical and folk background, attempted to have the band tighten its loosely structured songs. The band resisted at first, but came to see things Ezrin's way, and ten to twelve hours a day of rehearsal resulted in a tight set of hard-rocking songs with little of the psychedelic freak-rock aesthetic of the first two albums. According to Cooper, Ezrin "ironed the songs out note by note, giving them coloring, personality", including cutting down "I'm Eighteen" from an eight-minute jam to a tight three-minute rocker, a song whose aggressive chorus he misheard at first as "I'm Edgy".

"I'm Eighteen" was a sixteen-track recording made at RCA Mid-American Recording Center in Chicago. Ezrin found it a challenge to capture Cooper's raspy vocals with standard techniques; he settled on using a Shure SM57 microphone with high compression and judicious addition of treble and midrange equalization.

== Composition ==
The distorted, and arpeggiated main guitar riff in E minor drive the dark, aggressive song. Glen Buxton and Michael Bruce play similar rhythm guitar parts with slight differences; both used Gibson SG guitars. A pair of acoustic guitars subtly round out the sound—one filtered through a Leslie speaker. Dennis Dunaway plays a moving, melodic bass part rather than taking the typical rock strategy of holding to the root. The performance also features some distorted lead guitar, vocalist Cooper on harmonica during the intro, and an organ that joins the band for the closing chord.

Cooper's sings with raspy vocals of the existential anguish of being at the cusp of adulthood, decrying in each verse being "in the middle"—"of life" or "of doubt". The chorus switches to a series of crashing power chords building from A, the vocals proclaiming: "I'm eighteen / And I don't know what I want ... I gotta get out of this place / I'll go runnin' in outer space". The song turns around at the conclusion with an embrace of those things that had been such anguish: "I'm eighteen and I like it!" There are no harmonies or doubling in the vocals.

== Personnel ==
Alice Cooper: Vocals, harmonica
Glen Buxton: Lead guitar
Michael Bruce: Guitar, organ
Dennis Dunaway: Bass guitar
Neal Smith: Drums

== Release and reception ==
In November 1970, the group released a single of "I'm Eighteen" (shown on the label simply as "Eighteen") backed with "Is It My Body", and Warner Bros. agreed that if it sold well the group could go forward with an album. The band posed as fans and made hundreds of calls to radio stations to request the song, and Gordon is said to have paid others a dollar per radio request. Soon the song was on the airwaves across the country—even on mainstream AM radio—and peaked at number 21 on the charts. In Canada it broke the top ten, peaking at number 7. The success convinced Warner to allow the band to go ahead with Love It to Death, released March 1971. The band's next single was "Caught in a Dream" backed with "Hallowed Be My Name" in May 1971.

Record World called the single "a tight number that is for once as dynamic as the group really is."

== Legacy ==
The band played "I'm Eighteen" live on the German television show Beat-Club in 1972. Cooper appeared on the floor in a Wonder Woman T-shirt gripping a whiskey bottle. During an extended intro, Cooper declares "I ain't twenty-one", then "twenty-two" and on until "twenty-five" before the band delivers an aggressive, heavily distorted performance of the song.

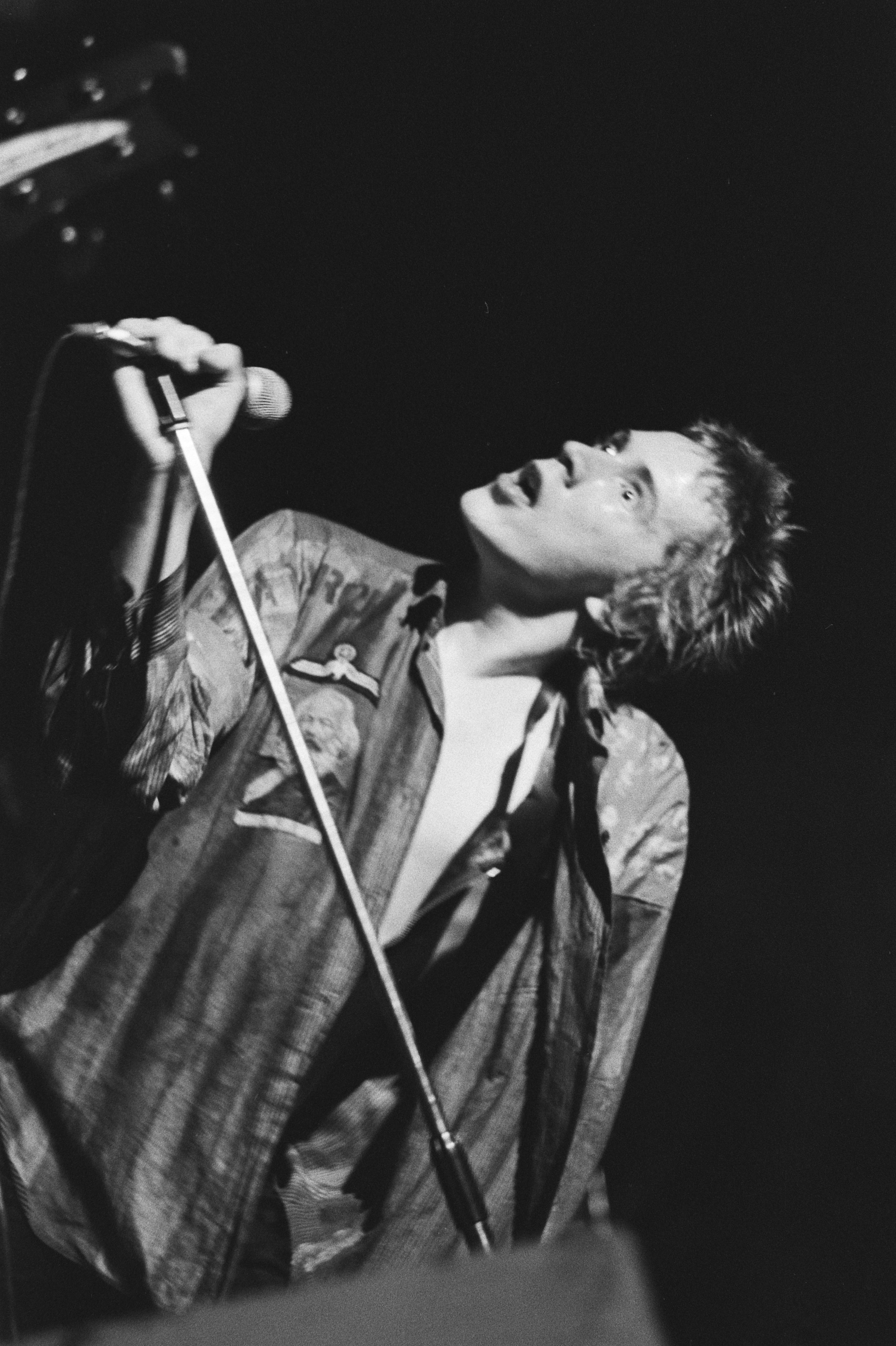
Legend has it John Lydon auditioned for the Sex Pistols by miming to "I'm Eighteen".

Vocalist Joey Ramone based the first song by New York punk band the Ramones, "I Don't Care", on the chords of the main riff to "I'm Eighteen". John Lydon wrote the song "Seventeen" on the Sex Pistols album Never Mind the Bollocks in response to "I'm Eighteen", and is said to have auditioned for the Sex Pistols by miming to an Alice Cooper song—most frequently reported as "I'm Eighteen".

The song "Dreamin'" on the 1998 Kiss album Psycho Circus bears such a resemblance to "I'm Eighteen" that a month after the album's release Cooper's publisher filed a plagiarism suit, settled out of court in Cooper's favor.

Rolling Stone included the song in 2004 on its "500 Greatest Songs of All Time" list at No. 482 and at No. 487 in 2010. "I'm Eighteen" was selected by the Rock and Roll Hall of Fame as one of the 500 Songs that Shaped Rock and Roll. It was voted No. 38 in Detroit's 100 Greatest Songs, a 2016 Detroit Free Press poll. The song ranked No. 39 on VH1's 40 Greatest Metal Songs in 2006.

== Covers ==
Thrash metal band Anthrax included a cover of "I'm Eighteen" on its debut album Fistful of Metal (1984). Creed provided a cover version of the song for the soundtrack to the 1998 teen horror movie The Faculty.

The song was also covered by Camp Freddy with Slash of Guns N' Roses on guitar and Chester Bennington of Linkin Park on vocals.

Don Dokken, Bob Kulick, John Norum, Tim Bogert, Gregg Bissonette and David Glen Eisley performed the song on the 1999 tribute album Humanary Stew: A Tribute to Alice Cooper.

The song featured as a 'b-side' track on the Big Country CD single "You Dreamer" in 1995.

== Charts ==
Weekly charts
Chart (1971)	Peak position
Canadian RPM	7
U.S. Billboard Hot 100	21

Year-end charts
Chart (1971)	Rank
Canada	87
U.S. (Joel Whitburn's Pop Annual)	160

== Works cited ==
- Talevski, Nick (2010). Rock Obituaries: Knocking On Heaven's Door. Omnibus Press. ISBN 9780857121172.
- Baseford, Chris (February 11, 2010). "Secrets of the Masters: "I'm Eighteen" by Alice Cooper". Premier Guitar.
- Billboard staff (February 6, 1971). "Alice Produced by Richardson". Billboard. Nielsen Business Media. p. 68. ISSN 0006-2510.
- Billboard staff (May 8, 1971). "Billboard Album Reviews". Billboard. Nielsen Business Media. p. 66. ISSN 0006-2510.
- Brackett, Nathan; Hoard, Christian David, eds. (2004). "Alice Cooper". The New Rolling Stone Album Guide. Simon & Schuster. p. 11. ISBN 978-0-7432-0169-8.
- Crouse, Richard (2012). Who Wrote The Book Of Love?. Doubleday Canada. ISBN 978-0-385-67442-3.
- English, Timothy (2007). Sounds Like Teen Spirit. iUniverse. pp. 46–47. ISBN 978-0-595-90692-5.
- Ellis, Iain (2012). Brit Wits: A History of British Rock Humor. Intellect Books. ISBN 978-1-84150-565-7.
- Faulk, Barry (2013). British Rock Modernism, 1967–1977: The Story of Music Hall in Rock. Ashgate Publishing. ISBN 978-1-4094-9413-3.
- Harrington, Joe S. (2002). Sonic Cool: The Life & Death of Rock 'n' Roll. Hal Leonard Corporation. ISBN 978-0-634-02861-8.
- Hartley, Jason (2010). Advanced Genius Theory: Are They Out of Their Minds or Ahead of Their Time?. Simon and Schuster. ISBN 978-1-4391-1748-4.
- Hodgson, Jay (2010). Understanding Records: A Field Guide To Recording Practice. Bloomsbury Publishing. ISBN 978-1-4411-2409-8.
- Interactive Guitar staff (March 2012). "Alice Cooper Band Members Talk About Their Dual-SG Sound". Interactive Guitar. Archived from the original on December 7, 2014.
- Konow, David (2009). Bang Your Head: The Rise and Fall of Heavy Metal. Crown Publishing Group. ISBN 978-0-307-56560-0.
- Leigh, Mickey (2011). I Slept with Joey Ramone: A Family Memoir. Simon and Schuster. ISBN 978-1-4516-3986-5.
- Marcus, Greil (2009). Lipstick Traces. Harvard University Press. ISBN 978-0-674-03480-8.
- Prown, Pete; Newquist, Harvey P. (1997). "Alice Cooper". Legends of Rock Guitar: The Essential Reference of Rock's Greatest Guitarists. Hal Leonard Corporation. ISBN 978-0-7935-4042-6.
- Rolling Stone staff (April 7, 2011). "Alice Cooper, 'I'm Eighteen'". Rolling Stone. Archived from the original on July 6, 2012.
- RPM staff (May 8, 1971). "RPM 100 Singles". RPM. 15 (12). Archived from the original on November 7, 2014.

Shapiro, Marc (2000). Creed: From Zero to Platinum. St. Martin's Press. ISBN 978-0-312-27637-9.

- Sherman, Dale (2009). The Illustrated Collector's Guide to Alice Cooper. Collector's Guide Publishing, Incorporated. ISBN 978-1-894959-93-3.
- Strausbaugh, John (2002). Rock 'til You Drop: The Decline from Rebellion to Nostalgia. Verso. ISBN 978-1-85984-486-1.
- Thompson, Dave (2012). Welcome To My Nightmare: The Alice Cooper Story. Music Sales Group. ISBN 978-0-85712-781-5.
- VH1 staff (2006). "The Greatest: 40 Greatest Metal Songs". VH1. Archived from the original on September 13, 2006.
- Waksman, Steve (2009). This Ain't the Summer of Love: Conflict and Crossover in Heavy Metal and Punk. University of California Press. ISBN 978-0-520-94388-9.
- Walker, Michael (2013). What You Want Is in the Limo: On the Road with Led Zeppelin, Alice Cooper, and the Who in 1973, the Year the Sixties Died and the Modern Rock Star Was Born. Random House Publishing Group. ISBN 978-0-679-64415-6.
- Wall, Mick (2010). Enter Night: A Biography of Metallica. St. Martin's Press. ISBN 978-1-4299-8703-5.
- Whitburn, Joel (2000). Joel Whitburn's Pop Annual, 1955–1999. Record Research. ISBN 978-0-89820-141-3.
