= The Revenge of Alice Cooper =

Studio album by Alice Cooper
- Released: July 25, 2025
- Recorded: 2024
- Studios: Carriage House (Stamford); Soultrain (Nashville); Pentavarit (Nashville); Noble Street (Toronto); The Village (West Los Angeles); Tempest (Phoenix); Whitney (Glendale); Sunwest (Hollywood)
- Genres: Hard rock, Shock rock, Glam rock
- Length: 54:20
- Label: earMusic
- Producer: Bob Ezrin

Alice Cooper chronology
Road (2023)	The Revenge of Alice Cooper (2025)

Singles from The Revenge of Alice Cooper
- 1. "Black Mamba" Released: April 23, 2025; 2. "Wild Ones" Released: June 4, 2025; 3. "Up All Night" Released: July 16, 2025

Professional ratings
Aggregate scores
Source	Rating
Metacritic	75/100
Review scores
Source	Rating
AllMusic	4/5 stars
The Arts Desk	4/5 stars
Classic Rock	4/5 stars
Mojo	3/5 stars
musicOMH	3/5 stars
Record Collector	5/5 stars
Uncut	7/10

The Revenge of Alice Cooper is the eighth studio album by American rock band Alice Cooper. It was released on July 25, 2025, by earMusic and is the group's first full collaboration since 1973's Muscle of Love.

== Background ==
The surviving members of the original Alice Cooper band reunited for some songs on Cooper's albums, Welcome 2 My Nightmare (2011), Paranormal (2017) and Detroit Stories (2021). Producer Bob Ezrin and Alice Cooper said that a new album with the surviving members would be possible.

On April 19, 2025, it was announced that Alice Cooper had reunited with former band members Michael Bruce, Dennis Dunaway, and Neal Smith for the first time in 51 years to release The Revenge of Alice Cooper. The album was released on July 25 via earMusic and also features guitarists Gyasi Heus and Rick Tedesco filling in for original guitarist Glen Buxton who died in 1997, although some unreleased guitar recordings by Buxton are heard on the album on the songs "What Happened to You", and "Return of the Spiders 2025".

== Production ==
The album is produced by Bob Ezrin, who worked with the original group on previous albums such as Love It to Death, Killer, School’s Out, and Billion Dollar Babies as well as 11 solo albums by lead vocalist Alice Cooper including 1975's Welcome To My Nightmare.

== Release ==
The album's first single, "Black Mamba", debuted on April 22, 2025, on Cooper's syndicated radio show Alice's Attic.

The project was released on various formats including CD digipack, double black vinyl LP, a double yellow vinyl LP, an autographed double pink & black swirl vinyl LP and a special limited edition box set featuring CD, 7 inch vinyl, art print, and T-shirt.

== Track listing ==
The Revenge of Alice Cooper track listing
No.	Title	Writer(s)	Length
1.	"Black Mamba"	Alice Cooper; Bob Ezrin; Michael Bruce	4:57
2.	"Wild Ones"	Cooper; Ezrin; Dennis Dunaway	4:17
3.	"Up All Night"	Cooper; Ezrin; Bruce	3:07
4.	"Kill the Flies"	Cooper; Ezrin; Neal Smith	4:13
5.	"One Night Stand"	Cooper; Ezrin; Dunaway	3:06
6.	"Blood on the Sun"	Dunaway	6:03
7.	"Crap That Gets in the Way of Your Dreams"	Cooper; Ezrin; Smith	3:00
8.	"Famous Face"	Bruce	4:19
9.	"Money Screams"	Cooper; Bruce; Smith	3:44
10.	"What a Syd"	Cooper; Dunaway	2:42
11.	"Intergalactic Vagabond Blues"	Cooper; Ezrin; Bruce; Smith	3:11
12.	"What Happened to You"	Cooper; Ezrin; Dunaway; Glen Buxton; Bruce; Smith	4:00
13.	"I Ain't Done Wrong"	Keith Relf	3:43
14.	"See You on the Other Side"	Cooper; Dunaway; Smith	3:58

7-inch LP bonus tracks
No.	Title	Writer(s)	Length
15.	"Return of the Spiders 2025"	Cooper; Bruce; Dunaway; Buxton; Smith	4:17
16.	"Titanic Overunderture"	Cooper; Bruce; Dunaway; Buxton; Smith	1:27

== Personnel ==
Credits adapted from the album's liner notes.

=== Alice Cooper ===
- Alice Cooper – lead vocals (all tracks), backing vocals (tracks 1–4, 6–9, 11); snaps, gang vocals (10); harp (11, 13, 15), claps (11)
- Neal Smith – drums (1–14), percussion (1, 6)
- Dennis Dunaway – bass (1–14), backing vocals (1, 4, 6, 14), guitar (6), gang vocals (10)
- Michael Bruce – guitar (1–14), backing vocals (1, 2, 5, 8, 12, 14), lead vocals (8); piano, synthesizer (8); Rhodes electric piano (10), organ (16)
- Glen Buxton – guitar (12, 15)

=== Additional contributors ===
- Bob Ezrin – production, mixing (all tracks); backing vocals (2, 4–9, 11, 12, 14), tambourine (3, 12), organ (4, 6), synthesizer (4), percussion (7); snaps, gang vocals (10); claps (11)
- Gyasi Heus – guitar (1–14), glockenspiel (4)
- Anthony Iordanov – engineering, mixing (1–14)
- McLee Mathiaus – engineering (1–14)
- Justin Cortelyou – engineering (1–14)
- Bobby Holland – engineering (1–14)
- Nichole Schmidt – engineering (1–14)
- Clarke Rigsby – engineering (1–14), backing vocals (8)
- Dick Kunc – engineering (16)
- Barry Keene – engineering (15)
- Kyle Blunt – engineering assistance (1–14)
- Louis Remenapp – engineering assistance (1–14)
- Jasper Terpstra – engineering assistance (1–14)
- Diego Diaz – pre-production engineering (1–14)
- Julian Shank – mixing (1–14)
- Kim Markovchick – production management (1–14)
- Robert Vosgien – mastering (1–14)
- Robby Krieger – lead guitar (1)
- Rick Tedesco – guitar (2–4, 6–8, 11, 14)
- Steve Potts – guitar (8)
- Conrad Varela – guitar (8)
- AD Adams – percussion, backing vocals (8)
- Lynn Bruce – additional bass, backing vocals (8)
- Tom Booth – B3 organ, backing vocals (8)
- Jeff Burkett – backing vocals (8)
- Ross Harwood – piano (12)
- David Briggs – production (15)
- Len DeLessio – photography
- Graham Humphreys – art direction, cover design
- Marek Swiatek – layout design

== Charts ==
Chart performance for The Revenge of Alice Cooper
Chart (2025)	Peak position
Australian Albums (ARIA)	12
Austrian Albums (Ö3 Austria)	3
Belgian Albums (Ultratop Flanders)	12
Belgian Albums (Ultratop Wallonia)	6
Croatian International Albums (HDU)	2
Dutch Albums (Album Top 100)	30
Finnish Albums (Suomen virallinen lista)	14
French Albums (SNEP)	32
French Rock & Metal Albums (SNEP)	2
German Albums (Offizielle Top 100)	2
Japanese Western Albums (Oricon)	22
Scottish Albums (Official Charts)	3
Swedish Albums (Sverigetopplistan)	3
Swiss Albums (Schweizer Hitparade)	2
UK Albums (Official Charts)	9
UK Independent Albums (Official Charts)	2
UK Rock & Metal Albums (Official Charts)	1
US Billboard 200	72
US Independent Albums (Billboard)	14
US Top Rock & Alternative Albums (Billboard)	16
