= School's Out (song) =

1972 single by Alice Cooper

- Cover of the 1972 US single

Single by Alice Cooper

from the album School's Out
- B-side: "Gutter Cat"
- Released: April 26, 1972
- Recorded: 1972
- Genre: Hard rock; glam rock
- Length: 3:29
- Label: Warner Bros.
- Songwriters: Alice Cooper; Michael Bruce; Glen Buxton; Dennis Dunaway; Neal Smith
- Producer: Bob Ezrin

Alice Cooper singles chronology
"Be My Lover" (1972)	"School's Out" (1972)	"Elected" (1972)

Alternative cover
- Cover of the 1972 German single

"School's Out" is a song first recorded as the title track of Alice Cooper's fifth studio album. It was released as the album's only single on April 26, 1972. "School's Out" was Alice Cooper's biggest international hit and it has been regarded as their signature song and reached number seven on the Billboard Hot 100, number three in the Canadian RPM 100 Singles chart, number two on the Irish Singles Chart and number one on the UK Singles Chart.

In 2015, the song was inducted into the Grammy Hall of Fame.

== Inspiration and writing ==
Cooper has said he was inspired to write the song when answering the question, "What's the greatest three minutes of your life?". Cooper said: "There's two times during the year. One is Christmas morning, when you're just getting ready to open the presents. The greed factor is right there. The next one is the last three minutes of the last day of school when you're sitting there and it's like a slow fuse burning. I said, 'If we can catch that three minutes in a song, it's going to be so big."

Cooper has also said it was inspired by a line from a Bowery Boys movie. On his radio show, Nights with Alice Cooper, he joked that the main riff of the song was inspired by a song by Miles Davis. Cooper said that guitarist Glen Buxton created the song's opening riff.

The lyrics of "School's Out" indicate that not only is the school year ended for summer vacation, but ended forever, and that the school itself has been literally blown up. It incorporates the childhood rhyme, "No more pencils, no more books, no more teachers' dirty looks" into its lyrics. It also featured children contributing some of the vocals. "Innocence" in the lyric " ... and we got no innocence" is frequently changed in concert to "intelligence" and sometimes replaced with "etiquette." The song appropriately ends with a school bell sound that fades out.

Later performances saw Alice Cooper incorporate parts of the first verse of "Another Brick in the Wall, Part 2", a song by Pink Floyd (also about school, and produced by Bob Ezrin) into "School's Out".

== Release and reception ==
"School's Out" became Alice Cooper's first major (and highest-charting) hit single, reaching number seven on the US Billboard Hot 100 pop singles chart and propelling the album to number two on the Billboard 200 pop albums chart. Its number-seven peak position was matched only by "Poison" among Cooper's solo efforts. Billboard ranked it as the number-75 song for 1972. In Canada, the single went to number three on the RPM 100 Singles Chart following the album reaching number one. In Britain, the song went to number one on the UK Singles Chart for three weeks in August 1972. It also marked the first time that Alice Cooper became regarded as more than just a theatrical novelty act.

The single version of the song is a slightly sped-up narrow stereo remix of the album version with one major difference—the "turn-off" effect used upon the school bell and sound effects at the end of the album version is not used on the single version, allowing the school bell and effects to simply fade out.

Some radio stations banned the song from their airwaves, stating that the song gave the students an impression of rebelliousness against childhood education. Teachers, parents, principals, counselors, and psychologists also shunned the song and demanded several radio stations ban the song from ever being played on the air.

Upon the release of the single, Record World said: "Heavy seasonal rocker will have Alice's hordes of fans swinging all summer. Their best since 'Eighteen,' and a super hit."

"School's Out" was ranked number 326 on Rolling Stone's list of The 500 Greatest Songs of All Time. In 2009 it was named the 35th best hard rock song of all time by VH1 and the song appeared on the TV show American Idol in 2010. The Guardian placed it as number 3 on its list of "The 20 best glam-rock songs of all time." In 2018, Ian Chapman and Pittsburgh Post-Gazette called it a "glam rock anthem." Nick Talevski has called it a "hard rock anthem" in his book Rock Obituaries: Knocking On Heaven's Door. The Independent placed the song tenth in the list "Gold Dust: Glam rock's top 10 singles."

== Use in popular media ==
The song was used in the 1979 comedy film Rock 'n' Roll High School as well as in the 1993 film, Dazed and Confused. The song can be heard in The Simpsons episode Kamp Krusty, and the Family Guy episode Don't Be a Dickens at Christmas.

The song was also used in the 1996 slasher film, Scream.

In 2004, the song was also used in a Staples television commercial for the back to school retail period in which Cooper appeared as himself.

== Personnel ==
- Alice Cooper – lead vocals
- Glen Buxton – lead guitar
- Michael Bruce – rhythm guitar, keyboards, backing vocals
- Dennis Dunaway – bass guitar, backing vocals
- Neal Smith – drums, backing vocals

== Notable cover versions ==
Krokus released the album Change of Address in 1986, which featured a cover of "School's Out". This version peaked at number 67 on the Hot 100.

== Charts ==
=== Weekly charts ===
Chart (1972)	Peak position
Australia (Go-Set)	22
Australia (KMR)	39
Austria (Ö3 Austria Top 40)	12
Canada Top Singles (RPM)	3
Germany	5
Ireland (IRMA)	2
Netherlands (Single Top 100)	9
New Zealand (Listener)	9
Norway (VG-lista)	6
UK Singles (Official Charts)	1
US Billboard Hot 100	7
US Cash Box Top 100	6

=== Year-end charts ===
Chart (1972)	Position
Canada (RPM)	48
US Billboard Hot 100	75
US Cash Box	51

== Certifications ==
Region	Certification	Certified units/sales
United Kingdom (BPI)	Silver	200,000^{‡}
^{‡} Sales+streaming figures based on certification alone.
