= School Days =

School Days may refer to:

== Film and fiction ==
- School Days (1920 film), American comedy starring Larry Semon
- School Days (1921 film), American comedy starring Wesley Barry
- School Days (1932 film), a Flip the Frog cartoon
- School Days (1995 film), Taiwanese teen drama
- "School Days", an episode of The Wind in the Willows
- School Days (novel), 2005 novel by Robert B. Parker
- School Days (video game), 2005 Japanese video game
- Chemin d'école, a novel by Patrick Chamoiseau, published in English as School Days

== Music ==
- School Days (album), a 1976 album by Stanley Clarke
- School Days: The Early Recordings, a 1973 album by Alice Cooper
- School Days, a 1951 album by Dizzy Gillespie
- "School Days" (Chuck Berry song), 1957
- "School Days" (Will D. Cobb and Gus Edwards song), a 1907 American pop song by Will Cobb and Gus Edwards
- "Schooldays", a 1972 song by Gentle Giant from the album Three Friends
- "Schooldays", a 1975 song by The Kinks from the album Schoolboys in Disgrace
- "School Days", a 1977 song by The Runaways from the album Waitin' for the Night
- "School Days", a 1991 song by Joe Walsh from the album Ordinary Average Guy
- School Days (band), a free-jazz quintet including Paal Nilssen-Love

== See also ==
- School Daze (disambiguation)
- Skool Daze, a 1985 ZX Spectrum game
