= Edward Beardsley =

American artist (died 2017)

Edward Beardsley was an American artist who has also been a professor, dean of the division of fine arts and the founder and program director of the UCR/California Museum of Photography. Possibly his most well-known work was featured on the cover of Alice Cooper's debut album, Pretties For You. He died in 2017 at the age of 78.
