= Love It to Death =

- Original, uncensored album cover

Studio album by Alice Cooper
- Released: March 9, 1971
- Recorded: November–December 1970
- Studios: RCA Mid-American Recording Center (Chicago, Illinois)
- Genres: Hard rock; glam rock; shock rock; proto-punk
- Length: 36:58
- Labels: Straight; Warner Bros.
- Producers: Jack Richardson; Bob Ezrin

Alice Cooper chronology
Easy Action (1970)	Love It to Death (1971)	Killer (1971)

Singles from Love It to Death
- 1. "I'm Eighteen" Released: November 1970; 2. "Caught in a Dream" Released: May 1971

Love It to Death is the third studio album by American rock band Alice Cooper, released on March 9, 1971. It was the band's first commercially successful album and the first album that consolidated the band's aggressive hard-rocking sound, instead of the psychedelic and experimental rock style of their first two albums. The album's best-known track, "I'm Eighteen", was released as a single to test the band's commercial viability before the album was recorded.

Formed in the mid-1960s, the band took the name Alice Cooper in 1968 and became known for its outrageous theatrical live shows. The loose, psychedelic freak rock of the first two albums failed to find an audience. The band moved to Pontiac, MI in 1970 where they were influenced by the aggressive hard rock scene. A young Bob Ezrin was enlisted as producer; he encouraged the band to tighten its songwriting over two months of rehearsing ten to twelve hours a day. The single "I'm Eighteen" achieved Top 40 success soon after, peaking at No. 21. This convinced Warner Bros. that Alice Cooper had the commercial potential to release an album. After its release in March 1971, Love It to Death reached No. 35 on the Billboard 200 albums chart and has since been certified platinum. The album's second single, "Caught in a Dream", charted at No. 94.

The original album cover featured the singer Cooper posed with his thumb protruding so it appeared to be his penis; Warner Bros. soon replaced it with a censored version. The Love It to Death tour featured an elaborate shock rock live show: during "Ballad of Dwight Fry"—about an inmate in an insane asylum—Cooper would be dragged offstage and return in a straitjacket, and the show climaxed with Cooper's mock execution in a prop electric chair during "Black Juju". Ezrin and the Coopers continued to work together for a string of hit albums until the band's breakup in 1974. The album has come to be seen as a foundational influence on hard rock, punk, and heavy metal; several tracks have become live Alice Cooper standards and are frequently covered by other bands.

== Background ==
Detroit-born vocalist Vincent Furnier co-formed the Earwigs in the mid-1960s in Phoenix, Arizona. The band released a few singles and went through a few name changes before settling on a lineup with guitarist Glen Buxton, guitarist and keyboardist Michael Bruce, bassist Dennis Dunaway, and drummer Neal Smith. In 1968 the band adopted the name Alice Cooper—a name Furnier later adopted as his own—and presented a story that it came from a 17th-century witch whose name they learned from a session with a ouija board.

At some point Buxton painted circles under his eyes with cigarette ashes, and soon the rest followed with ghoulish black makeup and outlandish clothes. The band moved to Los Angeles and became known for its provocative, theatrical shock rock stage show. In an incident during a performance at the Toronto Rock and Roll Revival in 1969, Cooper threw a live chicken into the audience, who tore it to shreds.

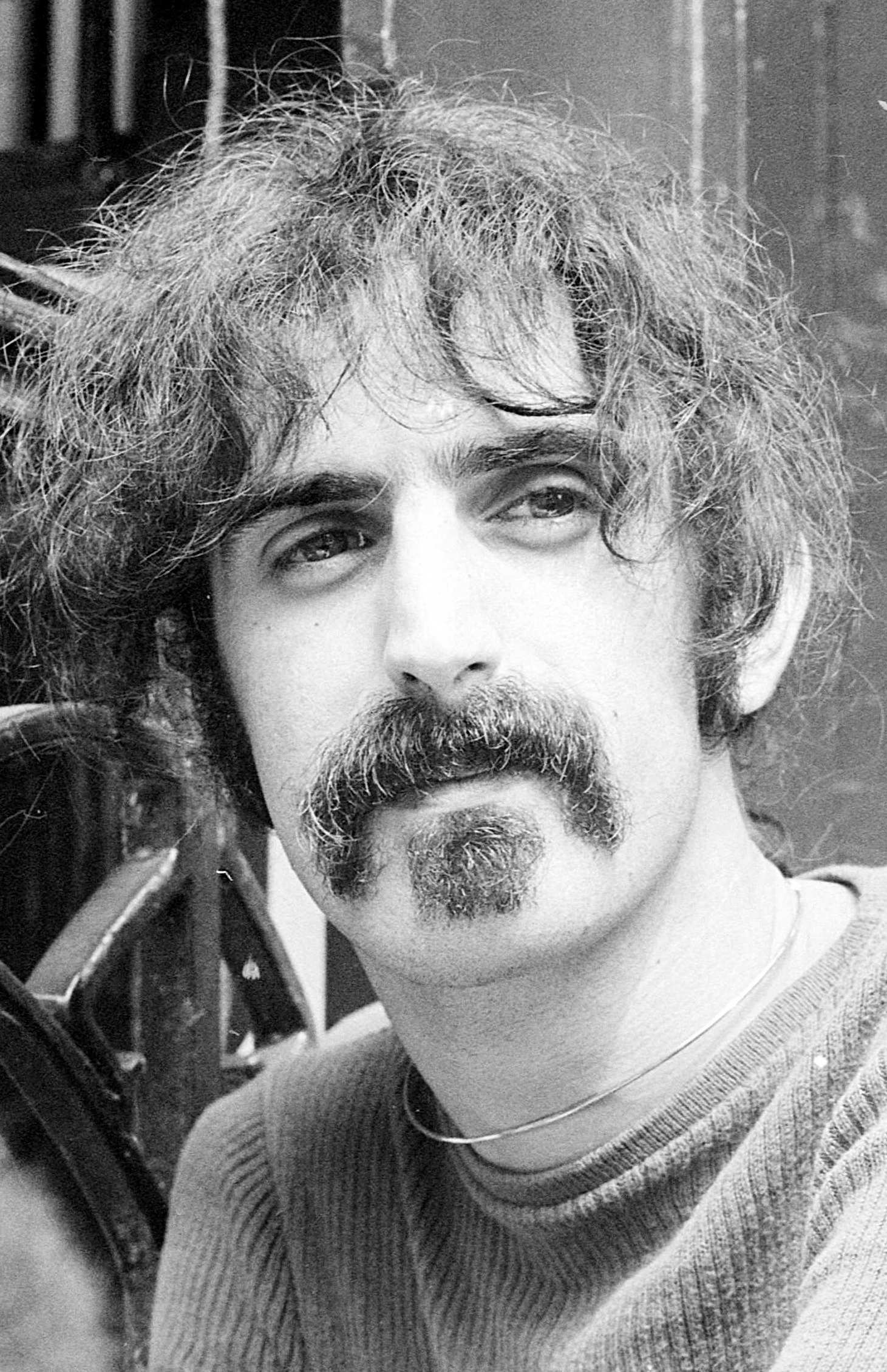
Frank Zappa (pictured 1970) signed Alice Cooper and released the band's first three albums.

The group's first three albums, Pretties for You (1969), Easy Action (1970), and Love It to Death (1971), appeared on Frank Zappa and Herb Cohen's Straight Records label; Pretties for You and Easy Action failed to find an audience. The band relocated to Detroit and found itself in the midst of a music scene populated with the hard-driving rock of the MC5, the stage-diving Iggy Pop with the Stooges, and the theatricality of George Clinton's Parliament and Funkadelic. The Alice Cooper band incorporated these influences into a tight hard-rock sound coupled with an outrageous live show.

While at the Strawberry Fields Festival in Canada in April 1970, band manager Shep Gordon contacted producer Jack Richardson, who had produced hit singles for the Guess Who. Richardson was uninterested in producing the Alice Cooper band himself, and sent the young Bob Ezrin in his place. Cooper recalled the junior producer as "a nineteen-year-old Jewish hippie" who reacted to meeting the outlandish band "as if he had just opened a surprise package and found a box full of maggots".

Ezrin initially turned down working with the band, but changed his mind when he saw them perform at Max's Kansas City in New York City the following October. Ezrin was impressed with the band's audience-participation rock-theater performance and the cult-like devotion of the band's fans, who dressed up and knew the lyrics and actions to the music, which Ezrin compared to the later cult following of The Rocky Horror Picture Show. Ezrin returned to Toronto to convince Richardson to take on the band; Richardson did not want to work directly with such a group but agreed on condition that Ezrin take the lead.

== Recording and production ==
The band and Ezrin did pre-production for the album in Pontiac, Michigan, in November and December 1970, and recorded at the RCA Mid-American Recording Center in Chicago in December. Richardson and Ezrin produced the album for Richardson's Nimbus 9 Productions, with Richardson as executive producer.

Ezrin, with his classical and folk background, attempted to have the band tighten the loosely structured songs. The band resisted at first but came to see things Ezrin's way, and ten to twelve hours a day of rehearsal resulted in a tight set of hard rock songs with little of the psychedelic freak-rock aesthetic of the first two albums. According to Cooper, Ezrin "ironed the songs out note by note, giving them coloring, personality". Ezrin rearranged "I'm Eighteen" from an eight-minute jam piece called "I Wish I Was 18 Again" to a taut three-minute rocker.

Both Buxton and Bruce used Gibson SG guitars and tended to double up, playing similar parts with subtle differences in phrasing and tone. Dunaway often played a moving counter-melody bass part, rather than following the typical rock strategy of holding to the chord's root.

Zappa and Herb Cohen sold Straight Records to Warner Bros. in 1970 for $50,000. That November (Note: October, according to some sources.) the group released a single of "I'm Eighteen" backed with "Is It My Body"; (Note: "Is It My Body" was incorrectly listed as "Body" and then "(Is It My) Body" on early pressings of the single.) and Warner Bros. agreed to allow the group to proceed with an album if the single sold well. The band posed as fans and made hundreds of calls to radio stations to request the song, and Gordon is said to have paid others a dollar per radio request. Soon the song was on the airwaves across the US—even on mainstream AM radio—and peaked at No. 21 on the charts. The success of the single convinced Warner to contract Richardson to produce Love It to Death.

Ezrin was intent on developing a cohesive sound for the album, and his earnestness was a source of humor for the band. At a time when the Beatles had a reputation that made them seem beyond criticism, the Alice Cooper band intended "Second Coming" as a jab at the recently released track "The Long and Winding Road" with Phil Spector's elaborate production—the hyperbolic acclaim it received struck the band as if it were the Second Coming of a master composer on the order of Beethoven—as well as Ezrin's attempts to bring such production values to Alice Cooper's music. Ezrin did not realize the joke was largely at his expense. When recording the "I wanna get out of here" sequence of "Ballad of Dwight Fry", Ezrin had Cooper lie on the floor surrounded by a cage of metal chairs to create an element of realism to the singer's frantic screams. "Black Juju" was the only track recorded live in the studio. "I'm Eighteen" was a sixteen-track recording at 15 IPS; other tracks were recorded at 30 IPS.

== Music and lyrics ==
A dark, aggressive song whose distorted guitar riff is in E minor scale, "I'm Eighteen" was the band's first to hit global audience. In raspy vocals against arpeggiated guitar backing, the lyrics describe the existential anguish of being at the cusp of adulthood, decrying in each verse being "in the middle" of something, such as "life" or "doubt". The chorus switches to a series of power chords building from A, the vocals proclaiming: "I'm eighteen / And I don't know what I want ... I gotta get out of this place / I'll go runnin' in outer space". The song turns around at the conclusion with an embrace of those things that had caused such anguish: "I'm eighteen and I like it!"

"I'm Eighteen"
"I'm Eighteen", with its heavy riff, was a youth anthem and the band's first hit.

"I'm Eighteen" comes between two straight-ahead rockers: "Long Way to Go" and album opener "Caught in a Dream". Both follow simple hard-rock formulas, trading heavy riffing with guitar fills and solos. The album title derives from lyrics in "Long Way to Go". "Caught in a Dream" was the album's second single and features irreverent, tongue-in-cheek lyrics such as "I need everything the world owes me / I tell that to myself and I agree". The first side closes with "Black Juju" by bassist Dunaway, a lengthy track in the vein of the Doors, and Pink Floyd's "Interstellar Overdrive"—both bands Alice Cooper earlier had opened for—with an organ part derived from Pink Floyd's "Set the Controls for the Heart of the Sun". The band named the song after a stray dog in Pontiac.

"Is It My Body", the B-side to the "I'm Eighteen" single, opens the second side of the album. The verses pose the questions: "What have I got? / That makes you want to love me? / Is it my body?"—and declare in the chorus: "Have you got the time to find out / Who I really am?" "Hallowed Be My Name" follows with lyrics such as "Screaming at mothers / Cursing the Bible". "Second Coming" continues on the theme of religion: "... have no other gods before me / I'm the light / The devil's getting smarter all the time" The track developed from one of Cooper's lyrical fragments—"Time is getting closer / I read it on a poster"—and is set to a delicate piano by Ezrin.

"Ballad of Dwight Fry"
"Ballad of Dwight Fry" mixes acoustic and electric guitars to detail the breakdown of a man in an insane asylum.

"Ballad of Dwight Fry" is a dramatic piece about the inmate of a mental asylum. It opens with a young girl's voice asking if her "Daddy" will "ever come home", (Note: The voice of the little girl was performed by a friend of the band, Monica Lauer. Neal Smith did the voice for the band's live shows.) against a childlike piano backdrop. The song shifts to acoustic guitar and Cooper singing presumably in the persona of the girl's father, at first in a wavering almost-whisper. His voice builds with his persona's increasing instability, eventually shouting in the heavy, guitar-backed chorus: "See my only mind explode / Since I've gone away". After the second chorus there is a softer, creepy keyboard break written by Bruce but played by Ezrin, and when the vocals reappear they repeat "I wanna get out of here", at first tentative and imploring, before climaxing in the character's total mental breakdown and a return to the chorus. The song's main character is named for Dwight Frye, an actor Hollywood media dubbed "the man with the thousand-watt stare" who portrayed Renfield, the lunatic slave of the titular vampire in the 1931 film Dracula starring Bela Lugosi, and Fritz, Dr. Frankenstein's assistant in the 1931 film Frankenstein.

The album closes with a cover of "Sun Arise" by Australian entertainer Rolf Harris. The upbeat pop song had been a show-opener for the band throughout 1970, and contrasts with the darkness of the rest of the album.

== Release and critical reception ==
Professional ratings
Review scores
Source	Rating
AllMusic	4.5/5 stars
Encyclopedia of Popular Music	4/5 stars
The Great Rock Discography	8/10
MusicHound Rock	4/5
The Rolling Stone Album Guide	4/5 stars
The Village Voice	B–

"I'm Eighteen" was the band's first top 40 in the US, a success that led to a recording deal with Warner Bros. Records. It spent eight weeks on the US charts, peaking at No. 21. In Canada it broke the top ten, peaking at No. 7.

Love It to Death was released on March 8, 1971; a British release of the album followed in June on the Straight label. Love It to Death was the first of the band's albums on which the members received individual credit for songs; previously the band as a whole was credited with all material. Although the original sleeve stated that the album was a Straight release, Straight had already been purchased by Warner Bros. and the album bore Warner disc labels. The album reached No. 35 on the US album charts, No. 28 in Britain, and No. 34 in Canada. The RIAA certified the album gold on November 6, 1972, and platinum on July 30, 2001. Alice Cooper was the first band on Warner Music Canada's roster to sell more than 100,000 copies each of four albums in Canada. In 1973 the band was awarded platinum albums in Canada for Love It to Death, Killer, School's Out, and Billion Dollar Babies. The album first appeared on CD in October 1990.

The original cover shows the long-haired band members in dresses and makeup, and Cooper holding a cape around himself with his thumb sticking out to give the illusion of an exposed penis. This led Warner Bros. to censor it—first that December by covering it with white strips, then by having the photo touched up with paint (Note: And not airbrushed, as is common when retouching photos.) (Note: Cassettes of the album have used the uncensored cover, whereas CDs have used the censored version.) in pressings beginning in 1972. Both front and back cover photos were taken by Roger Prigent, credited as "Prigent". The gatefold features a close-up photo by Dave Griffith of Cooper's eyes heavily made-up with spidery eyelashes; in his pupils appear photos of the other band members.

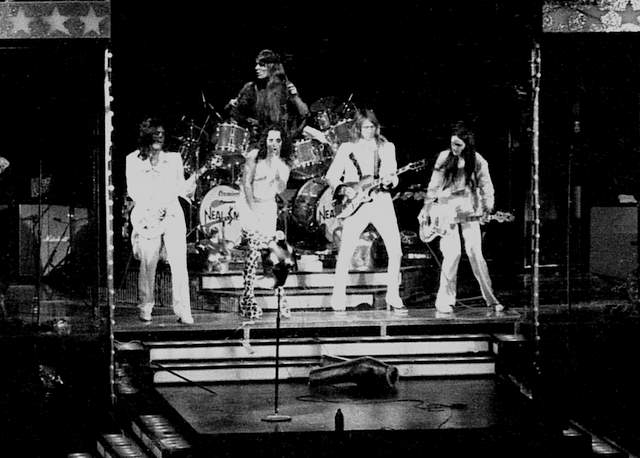
The band's success grew rapidly after the release of Love It to Death with a reputation for its flamboyant live show (pictured in 1973).

"Caught in a Dream" was released as a single backed with "Hallowed Be My Name" on April 27, 1971; it peaked in the US at No. 94. The group supported the album with extensive touring. "Ballad of Dwight Fry" was a dramatized set piece in the live show, featuring an actress dressed as a nurse (Note: The nurse was played by drummer Neal Smith's sister Cindy, who later married bassist Dennis Dunaway.) who dragged Cooper offstage and brought him back on straitjacketed in time for the second verse's "Sleepin' don't come very easy / In a strait white vest". At the song's climax, Cooper would break free of the straitjacket and hurl it into the audience. The Love It to Death tour of 1971 featured an electric chair in the earliest staged executions of the singer. These executions were to become an attraction of the band's shows, which became progressively more flamboyant; the shows in the Billion Dollar Babies tour of 1973 concluded with Cooper's execution by prop guillotine. The Love It to Death tour grossed so much the band bought a forty-two room mansion from actress Ann-Margret in Greenwich, Connecticut, which was to be its home base for the next few years.

The album garnered mixed reviews. Billboard called the album "artfully absurd third-generation rock" and the group "the first stars of future rock". John Mendelsohn gave the album a favorable review in Rolling Stone, writing that it "represents at least a modest oasis in the desert of dreary blue-jeaned aloofness served up in concert by most American rock-and-rollers". However, referring to "Black Juju" he also said that "the one bummer on this album is so loud a bummer that it may threaten to neutralize the ingratiating effect" of the other tracks. Robert Christgau wrote in The Village Voice, "The singles ('Caught in a Dream' and 'I'm Eighteen') are fantastic, but the album is freighted with post-psychedelic garbage, the kind of thing that's done better by the heavy metal kids down the block."

The band saw its popularity rise over the next several albums. Killer followed in November 1971 and reached No. 21 on the US charts, and the band finally topped those charts in 1973 with its sixth album, Billion Dollar Babies. Unreleased demos of Love It to Death have circulated among fans; highlights include outtakes of "Ballad of Dwight Fry" with alternative lyrics, and early versions of "You Drive Me Nervous", which did not have an official release until it appeared on Killer.

=== Live performances ===
In contrast to the first two albums, which have been entirely unrepresented in Cooper's band and solo concerts since the release of Killer, Love It to Death is the fourth-most-represented album in these setlists, behind Welcome to My Nightmare, Billion Dollar Babies and Killer. Nevertheless, Love It to Death's strong concert representation is almost entirely due to three songs—"I'm Eighteen", "Is It My Body" and "Ballad of Dwight Fry"—which have each seen over a thousand performances. "Hallowed Be My Name" has never been played live, "Black Juju" and "Sun Arise" have never been performed since the release of Killer, whilst "Second Coming" was not played after Killer's release until 2025. Even "Caught in a Dream" and "Long Way to Go" disappeared from Cooper's setlist soon after Killer was released and were revived only for individual tours beginning with the former song on the Brutal Planet tour.

== Legacy ==
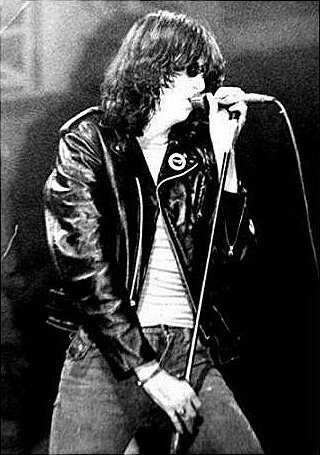
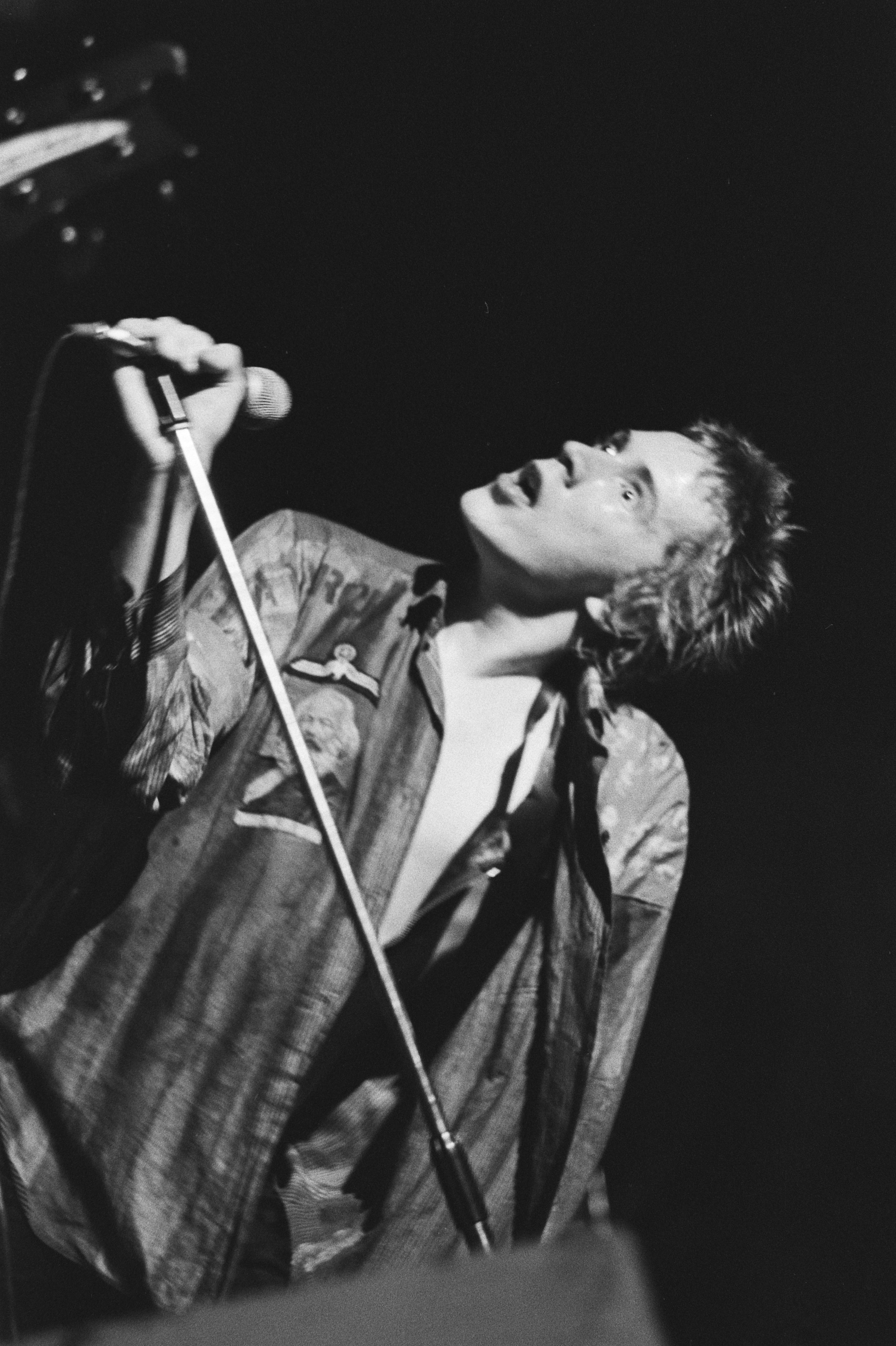
"I'm Eighteen" was a formative influence on punk idols. Joey Ramone wrote the first Ramones song "I Don't Care", based on its chords, and Johnny Rotten auditioned for the Sex Pistols by miming to it.

Love It to Death is seen as one of the foundational albums of the heavy metal sound, along with contemporary releases by Black Sabbath, Led Zeppelin, Deep Purple, and others. A review in British magazine Melody Maker called it "an album for the punk and pimply crowd" a few years before punk rock became a phenomenon. Pioneer punk band the Ramones found inspiration in Alice Cooper's music and Love It to Death in particular. Vocalist Joey Ramone based the group's first song, "I Don't Care", on the chords of the main riff to "I'm Eighteen". Johnny Rotten wrote the song "Seventeen" on the Sex Pistols only studio album Never Mind the Bollocks (1977) in response to "I'm Eighteen", and is said to have auditioned for the Sex Pistols by miming to an Alice Cooper song—most frequently reported as "I'm Eighteen". Love It to Death inspired Pat Smear to pick up the guitar at age twelve; he went on to co-found the Germs, tour as second guitarist for Nirvana, and play rhythm guitar for the Foo Fighters.

Hit Parader included Love It to Death in its heavy metal Hall of Fame in 1982, and placed the album twenty-first on its list of "Top 100 Metal Albums" in 1989. In 2012 it was ranked No. 454 on Rolling Stone's 500 Greatest Albums of All Time. Greg Prato of AllMusic called Love It to Death "an incredibly consistent listen from beginning to end" and "the release when everything began to come together for the band". To Pete Prown and HP Newquist, the groups's theatrical arrangements help its two guitarists "[transcend] the all-too-common clichés" in their simple hard-rock riffing and soloing "that were part and parcel of early seventies rock".

The band was pleased with the collaboration with Ezrin, and he remained their producer (with the exception of Muscle of Love, released in 1973) until Cooper's first solo album, Welcome to My Nightmare in 1975. Love It to Death launched Ezrin's own production career, which went on to include prominent albums such as Aerosmith's Get Your Wings (1974), Kiss's Destroyer (1976), and Pink Floyd's The Wall (1979).

Songs from Love It to Death continued to be frequent requests long after Cooper went solo. In response, when writing material for his 1989 album Trash, Cooper and producer Desmond Child spent time listening to Love it to Death and the band's 1974 Greatest Hits album to "find that vibe and match it to" a style appropriate to the 1990s.

Thrash metal band Anthrax included a cover of "I'm Eighteen" on its debut album Fistful of Metal in 1984. Alternative metal band the Melvins covered "Second Coming" and "Ballad of Dwight Fry" on their album Lysol in 1992. The song "Dreamin'" on the 1998 Kiss album Psycho Circus bears such a resemblance to "I'm Eighteen" that a month after the album's release Cooper's publisher filed a plagiarism suit, settled out of court in Cooper's favor. Swedish death metal band Entombed released an EP in 1999 entitled Black Juju that included a cover of "Black Juju". No-wave pioneer Lydia Lunch also covered "Black Juju".

Alternative rock band Sonic Youth recorded covers of "Hallowed Be My Name" (as "Hallowed Be Thy Name") and "Is It My Body"—the latter of which is bassist Kim Gordon's favorite of her own vocal performances. Gordon used the song's title for a 1993 essay on the artist Mike Kelley, in which she described the Coopers as "anti-hippie[s] reveling in the aesthetics of the ugly". The essay appeared in 2014 in a collection by Gordon also titled Is It My Body?

== Track listing ==
Side one
No.	Title	Writer(s)	Length
1.	"Caught in a Dream"	Michael Bruce	3:10
2.	"I'm Eighteen"	Bruce; Alice Cooper; Dennis Dunaway; Neal Smith; Glen Buxton	2:59
3.	"Long Way to Go"	Bruce	3:04
4.	"Black Juju"	Dunaway	9:14
Total length:			18:27

Side two
No.	Title	Writer(s)	Length
5.	"Is It My Body"	Cooper; Dunaway; Bruce; Smith; Buxton	2:34
6.	"Hallowed Be My Name"	Smith	2:30
7.	"Second Coming"	Cooper	3:04
8.	"Ballad of Dwight Fry"	Bruce; Cooper	6:33
9.	"Sun Arise"	Harry Butler; Rolf Harris	3:50
Total length:			18:31

== Personnel ==
The band members and recording personnel for Love It to Death:

Alice Cooper band

- Alice Cooper – lead vocals, harmonica
- Glen Buxton – lead guitar
- Michael Bruce – rhythm guitar, keyboards, backing vocals
- Dennis Dunaway – bass, backing vocals
- Neal Smith – drums, backing vocals

Additional musicians

- Bob Ezrin – keyboards on "Caught in a Dream", "Long Way to Go", "Hallowed Be My Name", "Second Coming", and "Ballad of Dwight Fry" (credited as "Toronto Bob Ezrin")

Production

- Jack Richardson and Bob Ezrin – production
- Jack Richardson – executive production
- Brian Christian – session engineering
- Randy Kring – mastering engineering
- Bill Conners – recording technician

== Charts ==
Chart (1971–1972)	Peak position
Canada Top Albums/CDs (RPM)	39
US Billboard 200	35
UK Albums (Official Charts)	28

== Certifications ==
Region	Certification	Certified units/sales
United States (RIAA)	Platinum	1,000,000^{^}
^{^} Shipments figures based on certification alone.
