= Easy Action =

Studio album by Alice Cooper
- Released: March 24, 1970
- Recorded: November–December 1969
- Studios: Sunwest Studios, Hollywood
- Genres: Psychedelic rock; hard rock; acid rock; garage rock; experimental rock
- Length: 34:13
- Label: Straight
- Producer: David Briggs

Alice Cooper chronology
Pretties for You (1969)	Easy Action (1970)	Love It to Death (1971)

Singles from Easy Action
- 1. "Shoe Salesman" Released: June 1970

Easy Action is the second studio album by the American rock band Alice Cooper, released by Straight Records in March 1970. The title comes from a line from one of the band's favorite films, the musical West Side Story. As with Pretties for You, the band's debut from the previous year, Easy Action was neither a commercial nor critical success. Singles include "Shoe Salesman" with "Return of the Spiders".

Drummer Neal Smith later said of the record producer David Briggs, "David hated our music and us. I recall the term that he used, referring to our music, was 'Psychedelic Shit'. I think Easy Action sounded too dry, more like a TV or radio commercial and he did not help with song arrangement or positive input in any way." None of Easy Action’s songs have ever been performed live by Cooper since the tour in support of their third album Love It to Death; in fact, only "Return of the Spiders" was performed on the tour for that album.

A small number of early U.S. copies were pressed on the blue Bizarre Records label. These copies carry the same catalog number WS-1845 and album cover as the regular Straight Records release.

Though perhaps considered overlooked work relative to later releases, Easy Action tracks "Mr. & Misdemeanor" and "Refrigerator Heaven" were both later included in the well-received compilation album The Life and Crimes of Alice Cooper. "Refrigerator Heaven" was also included in the Warner Bros. compilation album Zapped, which showcased acts signed or produced by Frank Zappa. The closing track "Lay Down And Die, Goodbye", which was originally written and recorded as a single B-side by the band when it was called Nazz, begins with a sample of Tom Smothers saying "You are the only censor; if you don't like what I'm saying, you have a choice: you can turn me off". This is followed by an instrumental jam and finishes with the chorus from the demo. The last part of the song is listed on the Science Fiction album as "I've Written Home to Mother", while the instrumental jam section is listed as "For Alice" or "An Instrumental".

== Production ==
Cooper and Dennis Dunaway were fond of the musical film West Side Story, and quotes from the film appear in the song "Still No Air" ("Got a rocket in your pocket", and "When you're a Jet, you're a Jet all the way"). In fact, it was another quote from the film that inspired the album's title.

== Release and reception ==
Professional ratings
Review scores
Source	Rating
Christgau's Record Guide	C

The album appeared in 1970 with a cover on which the band posed turned away from the camera, their uncovered backs exposed except where covered with their long hair. A radio commercial that accompanied the album's release touted the band as "unisex, raw, together, and violent—just like you, fellow American".

The staff of Rolling Stone did not like the album, stating that "there's nothing nearly that interesting" and that "the pretty stuff sounds like something Walt Disney had the good sense to leave in the can". Robert Christgau, in The Village Voice, rated it a C, explaining that it has very few of the "pseudo-decadent and -psychedelic charms" shown on Pretties for You, along with "tuneless singing, tuneless playing, tuneless tunes, and pseudo-musique concrete".

The music showed little of the hard rock the band became famous for. The songs on its first two albums are more reminiscent of the pop-rock and psychedelia of bands such as mid-1960s the Who and Jefferson Airplane. They failed to find an audience and sold poorly. The group moved to the Detroit area (Pontiac, Michigan), and with the next album, Love It to Death, producer Bob Ezrin had them strip down their sound and simplify the songwriting. That album and its first single, "I'm Eighteen", were the first in a string of big successes.

== Legacy ==
AllMusic's Joe Viglione feels that the album "might be the perfect picture of an evolving Alice Cooper Group". And that it "gives evidence that Cooper has more of a voice than he got credit for". He concludes by saying: "That this band could run the gamut from [Frank] Zappa to [David] Bowie, and perhaps inspired both, makes Easy Action a good study and entertaining record." An alternate version of "Return of the Spiders", recorded during the Easy Action sessions in 1969, was released in 2025 as a bonus track on some versions of The Revenge of Alice Cooper.

== Track listing ==
All tracks are written by Alice Cooper, Glen Buxton, Michael Bruce, Dennis Dunaway and Neal Smith.

Side one
No.	Title	Length
1.	"Mr. & Misdemeanor"	3:05
2.	"Shoe Salesman"	2:38
3.	"Still No Air"	2:32
4.	"Below Your Means"	6:41

Side two
No.	Title	Length
5.	"Return of the Spiders"	4:33
6.	"Laughing at Me"	2:12
7.	"Refrigerator Heaven"	1:54
8.	"Beautiful Flyaway"	3:02
9.	"Lay Down and Die, Goodbye"	7:36

== Personnel ==
Alice Cooper band

- Alice Cooper – vocals
- Glen Buxton – lead guitar
- Michael Bruce – rhythm guitar, piano on "Mr. & Misdemeanor" and "Beautiful Flyaway", backing vocals, lead vocals on "Below Your Means" and "Beautiful Flyaway"
- Dennis Dunaway – bass guitar, backing vocals
- Neal Smith – drums, backing vocals

with:

- David Briggs – piano on "Shoe Salesman"
