= Caught in a Dream =

- Japan picture sleeve

Single by Alice Cooper

from the album Love It to Death
- B-side: "Hallowed Be My Name"
- Released: May 1971
- Recorded: December 1970
- Genre: Hard rock; garage rock
- Length: 3:10
- Label: Warner Bros.
- Songwriter(s): Michael Bruce
- Producer(s): Bob Ezrin

Alice Cooper singles chronology
| "I'm Eighteen" (1970) | "Caught in a Dream" (1971) | "Under My Wheels" (1971) |

"Caught in a Dream" is a song by American rock band, Alice Cooper. It was written by the band's guitarist Michael Bruce and released in May, 1971 as the second single from their third album Love It to Death. It was backed with "Hallowed Be My Name", and peaked in the US at number 94.

As the album's opening track, it comes just before Love It to Death's signature hit "I'm Eighteen". A straight-ahead rocker that follows simple hard-rock formulas, trading heavy riffing with guitar fills and solos, "Caught in a Dream" was the album's second single and featured irreverent, tongue-in-cheek lyrics such as "I need everything the world owes me / I tell that to myself and I agree".
