= School Daze (disambiguation) =

School Daze is a 1988 film by Spike Lee.

School Daze may also refer to:

- School Daze (soundtrack), a soundtrack album from the film
- "School Daze" (Garfield and Friends), a television episode
- "School Daze" (Law & Order), a television episode
- "School Daze" (My Little Pony: Friendship Is Magic), a television episode
- "School Daze", a song by W.A.S.P. from W.A.S.P., 1984
- "School Daze", the 12th episode of "Blossom"
- "School Dazed", the 253rd episode of "Happy Days"

== See also ==
- Skool Daze, a 1980s ZX Spectrum and later Commodore 64 video game
- My School Daze, a Singaporean TV series
- School Days (disambiguation)
