= Glen Buxton =

American guitarist (1947–1997)

Background information
- Born: Glen Edward Buxton; November 10, 1947; Akron, Ohio, U.S.
- Died: October 19, 1997 (aged 49) Mason City, Iowa, U.S.
- Genres: Shock rock; rock; hard rock; heavy metal
- Occupation: Musician
- Instruments: Guitar

Glen Edward Buxton (November 10, 1947 – October 19, 1997) was an American guitarist who played lead guitar for the rock band Alice Cooper. In 2003, Rolling Stone magazine ranked him number 90 on its list of the "100 Greatest Guitarists of All Time". In 2011, Buxton was posthumously inducted into the Rock and Roll Hall of Fame as a member of the original Alice Cooper band.

== Early life ==
Born in Akron, Ohio, Buxton moved to Phoenix, Arizona, and attended Cortez High School. Cortez High School had a paper called the Tip Sheet which detailed events going on at the school. Alongside Dennis Dunaway and Vince Furnier, Glen Buxton contributed to the school paper. His contribution was as photographer. Dunaway was sports writer for the paper and Furnier was writer of a witty editorial column. In 1964, at Cortez High School, he made his debut in a rock band called The Earwigs. It was composed of fellow high school students Dennis Dunaway, Vincent Furnier, John Tatum and John Speer. At the onset, Buxton was the only member who could play an instrument, and thus taught some of the other members to play after the group decided to take a shot at becoming a real band. They became popular locally, and changed their name to The Spiders in 1965 and later to The Nazz in 1967. In 1966–67, guitarist John Tatum and drummer John Speer left the group, and rhythm guitarist/keyboardist Michael Bruce and drummer Neal Smith joined. In 1968, to avoid legal entanglements with the Todd Rundgren-led Nazz the group changed their name to Alice Cooper, premiering their new name at their performance at the Santa Barbara County Fairgrounds on March 20, 1968.

== Alice Cooper ==
Buxton was the co-writer of hit songs like "School's Out", "I'm Eighteen", "Elected," and "10 Minutes Before the Worm". He is credited as lead guitarist on seven albums by Alice Cooper, including the chart-topping Billion Dollar Babies. However, he was "not invited" to play on 1973's Muscle of Love and does not appear, although he is credited due to management's concerns about band image with the fans. Buxton had co-written four songs for Muscle of Love but does not play on any of them. According to drummer Neal Smith, the absence was due to "problems that Glen was having with the demons of rock and roll at that particular time..." The band sought out other guitar players to fill in, including Dick Wagner and fellow Cortez High School alum Mick Mashbir.

In an interview with Marc Maron, according to Alice Cooper, "Glen ended up being one of the great rock guitar players of all time. He created 'School's Out'. He created all that stuff." In a separate interview, Cooper stated, "Glen was not a songwriter. He would write riffs, though. They would show up on the album, and even great guitar players would say, 'What is that line? It's so weird, but it's catchy.' Mike (Bruce) was much more into chord structure. So, Glen was always sort of our icing on the cake."

== Post Alice Cooper years ==
Throughout the late 1970s and 1980s, Buxton maintained a low profile, playing only occasional club gigs with bands like Shrapnel and Virgin.

In the 1990s, Buxton lived in Clarion, Iowa, performing with local artists. In 1994 Buxton founded the band Buxton-Flynn with his long time friend, Michael Flynn. The band played shows throughout southern Minnesota and north Iowa.

Buxton worked for Goodyear Aerospace for about five years, and got in trouble with the IRS for failing to pay taxes on his share of proceeds from an investment fund created by the Alice Cooper band. Additionally, Buxton suffered from stomach ulcers and liver issues, but his sister said Buxton "hated doctors" and neglected medical care.

== Death ==
Shortly before his death, Buxton visited and played music with Michael Bruce and Neal Smith, longtime friends and former Alice Cooper bandmates. Buxton, Smith, and Bruce performed on a morning radio show in Houston on October 10, 1997, and performed a concert at nightclub Area 51 in Houston on October 12, 1997. Bassist Richie Scarlet (Frehley's Comet) filled in for Dennis Dunaway (who was unable to attend due to illness), and John Glenn joined on keyboards.

Buxton mentioned having some pain at the nightclub and his friends urged him to see a doctor, but Buxton replied he would wait until he got home. On October 19, his fiancée drove him to the hospital near his home in Clarion, Iowa. Buxton died of complications from pneumonia at a hospital in Mason City, Iowa, on October 19, 1997, aged 49.

He is buried in Evergreen Cemetery in Clarion, Iowa.

== Discography ==
=== with Alice Cooper ===
- Pretties for You (1969)
- Easy Action (1970)
- Love It to Death (1971)
- Killer (1971)
- School's Out (1972)
- Billion Dollar Babies (1973)
- Muscle of Love (1973) (Songwriting only; does not play on the album.)
- The Revenge of Alice Cooper (2025) (Two songs)

=== With Ant-Bee ===
- Lunar Muzik (1997)
