= Michael Bruce (musician) =

American rock musician (born 1948)

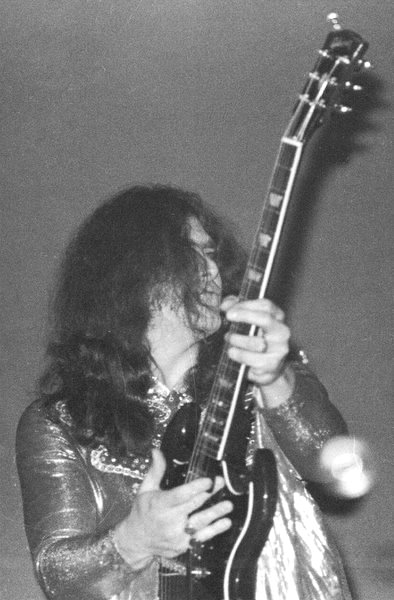

Background information
- Born: Michael Owen Bruce; March 16, 1948 (age 78)
- Genres: Rock; pop; folk; shock rock; hard rock; heavy metal
- Occupation: Musician
- Instruments: Guitar; keyboards; piano
- Years active: 1965–present
- Labels: Warner Bros.; Polydor; ERT; One Way Records; New Millennium Communications Ltd./Burning Airlines

Michael Owen Bruce (born March 16, 1948) is an American rock musician who was a founding member of the original Alice Cooper band.

== 1966-1973: Early life and Alice Cooper Group ==
Michael Bruce started playing guitar and piano in early adolescence and was heavily influenced by the Beatles. In 1966, Bruce replaced John Tatum in popular Phoenix-based group The Spiders alongside Vincent Furnier, Glen Buxton, Dennis Dunaway, and John Speer. The group quickly established themselves as a top regional act, sharing the stage with such notable groups as The Yardbirds, The Animals, and The Hollies. After relocating to Los Angeles, the group rebranded themselves as the Nazz.

In 1968, after discovering that Todd Rundgren had formed a group called Nazz, Bruce and company changed the name of their project to Alice Cooper, reflecting the sardonic humor that characterized the group and their style. With Bruce's contributions as a songwriter, guitarist and keyboardist, the band released a string of hit albums in the 1970s, including Love It to Death, Killer, School's Out, and Billion Dollar Babies.

Bruce's distinctive rhythm guitar riffs became an essential component of the group’s sound, and his songwriting skills added to the band's success. He was the sole composer of the songs "Be My Lover" and "Caught in a Dream", and he co-wrote many of the band's other famous hits, including "I'm Eighteen", "Under My Wheels", "School's Out", "No More Mr. Nice Guy" and "Billion Dollar Babies".

== 1973-75: In My Own Way ==
In 1973, Bruce began working on his own recordings with a group of musicians that included Mick Mashbir (guitars and vocals), Bob Dolin (keyboards and vocals), Frank Crandall (bass and vocals), and Don Lindley (percussion and vocals). Mashbir and Dolin had performed as members of the touring band with the Alice Cooper Billion Dollar Babies tour. This line-up recorded and produced four songs ("King of America", "As Rock Rolls On", "Oh, My Love" and "Nothing on Earth") that producer Jack Douglas mixed.

When Bruce decided to leave Connecticut in 1974 and move to Lake Tahoe, Crandall and Lindley did not follow. Bruce, Dolin and Mashbir were then faced with finding a new rhythm section. Drummers such as William "Curly" Smith (Jo Jo Gunne) and John Barbata (The Turtles; Crosby, Stills, Nash & Young) came to play and record at Bruce's Nevada home.

Bruce's album In My Own Way was recorded over the course of three months in 1975 with producers Gene Cornish and Dino Danelli of The Rascals. Many different musicians came to the Record Plant and participated in the sessions for the album, including Keith Moon (The Who), Gerry Beckley (America), Jackie Lomax (Badger), Ricky Fataar (The Beach Boys), David Foster (Airplay), Hunt Sales (Todd Rundgren, Iggy Pop), Tony Sales (Todd Rundgren, Iggy Pop), Mylon LeFevre, Lynn Carey, and many more. American fashion photographer Francesco Scavullo did a shoot for Bruce that yielded the cover of In My Own Way.

== 1976-77: Billion Dollar Babies (band) ==
Billion Dollar Babies was the name of the band founded in 1976 by Michael Bruce, Mike Marconi, Dennis Dunaway, Bob Dolin and Neal Smith after they split from Alice Cooper. Originally, Billion Dollar Babies started out in the hope that Alice would return and Battle Axe would be the new record from the Alice Cooper group. Time Magazine featured the group in a brief but hopeful write-up in 1977. There had been a theatrical stage show planned in which Bruce and Marconi would battle each other in the fashion of gladiators. Despite the positive start, the band was embroiled in a legal suit over the use of the name. The stage show was far too costly and the tour was quite brief. Their only release was 1977's Battle Axe. The Battle Axe record lost any momentum it had when it was recalled for mastering problems which caused the turntable needle to skip. Jack Douglas, who had worked on Muscle of Love with Jack Richardson, was hired to fix the mastering problem. With so many problems weighing them down, the group disbanded.

== Solo career ==
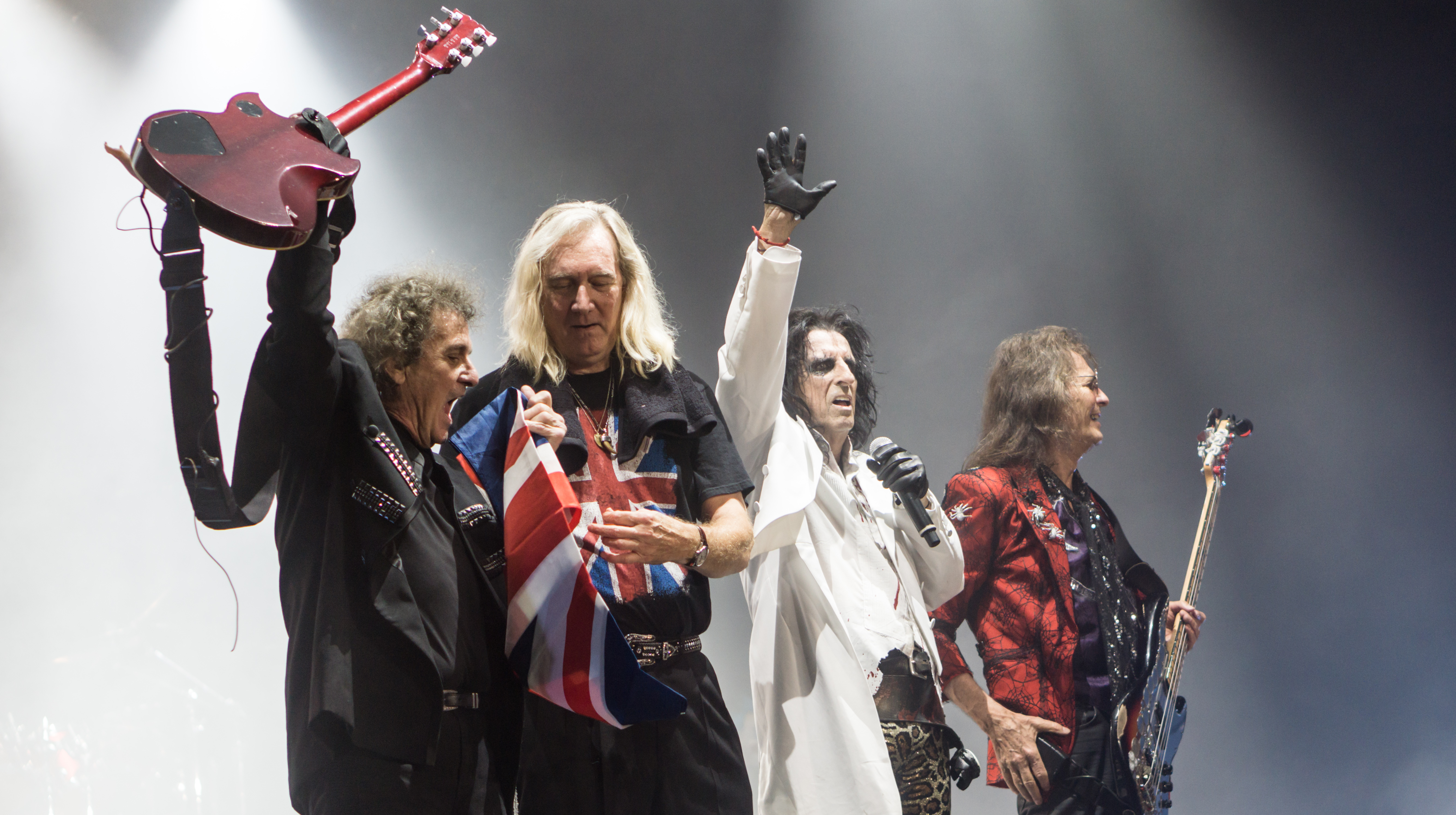
Bruce (far left) on stage with his ex-Alice Cooper bandmates in 2017

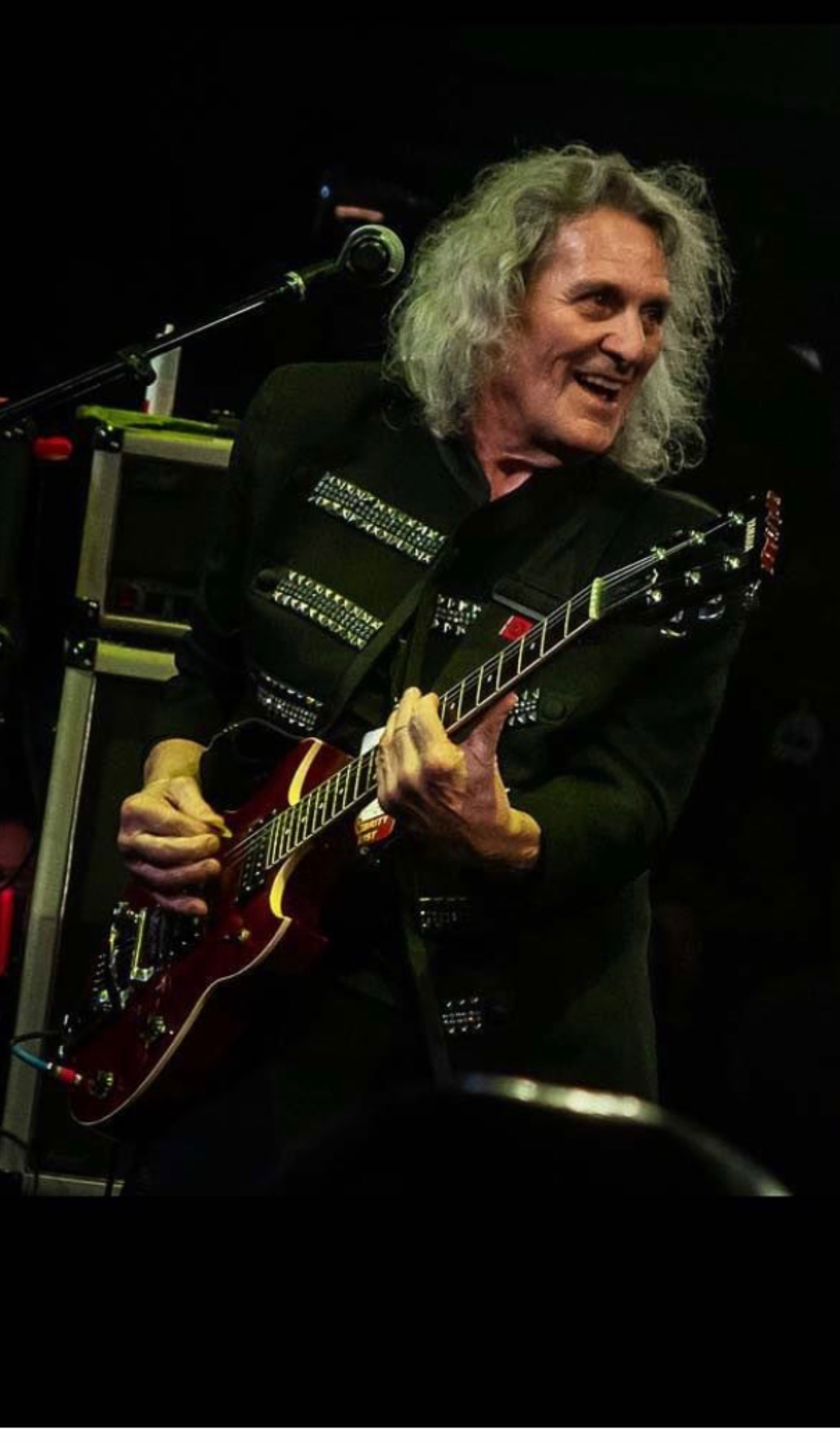
Michael Bruce performing at Alice Cooper's Christmas Pudding, 2019.

During 2010, Bruce was called on for participation in a new Alice Cooper record Welcome 2 My Nightmare (the sequel to the original Welcome to My Nightmare). Bruce co-wrote the song "When Hell Comes Home" on the album. Welcome 2 My Nightmare also featured performances by Neal Smith, Dennis Dunaway, Dick Wagner and Steve Hunter. Additionally, Alice invited Bruce, Hunter, Dunaway and Smith to perform with him that December at his annual Christmas Pudding fundraiser at The Dodge Theatre in Phoenix, Arizona.

In spring 2011, Bruce (as a member of the original Alice Cooper group) was inducted into the Rock and Roll Hall of Fame in the "Performer" category.

In early 2016, Bruce's new band, Michael Bruce Force, played a show at Asylum Records celebrating Record Store Day on April 6, 2016, in Mesa, Arizona.

Bruce was featured on three songs on Alice Cooper's next release, the 2017 album Paranormal: the song "Rats", as well as two bonus tracks featuring original Alice Cooper band members: "Genuine American Girl" and "You and All of Your Friends". He was subsequently featured on several tracks on Cooper's 2021 album Detroit Stories.

In 2023, Bruce was inducted into the Arizona Music & Entertainment Hall of Fame.

The Michael Bruce Band currently consists of Michael on guitar backed by his wife Lynette Bruce on bass, John Aquilino from Icon (band) on lead guitar, Matt Indes on drums, and Josh Decker from Black Oak Arkansas on vocals and keys. Steve Potts additionally contributed lead guitar parts to numerous studio sessions.

== Discography ==
=== Solo ===
- In My Own Way, Polydor (Issued 1975 but not released) Re-issued on CD by One Way Records in 1997)
- Rock Rolls On, ETR (Euro-Tech Records & Tapes) (1983) (Re-issued on CD by Gonzo Multimedia in 2018)
- Halo of Ice (Live in Reykjavik, Iceland, May 2001), Burning Airlines (2002)
- The Second Coming of Michael Bruce - Alive and Re-Cooperated (Live in Akureyri and Reykjavik, Iceland, October 2002; plus bonus studio tracks), GB Records (2005)
- Be Your Lover - Michael Bruce Anthology, Evangeline Records (2011)

=== With Billion Dollar Babies ===
- Battle Axe (1977)

=== With Alice Cooper Group ===
- Pretties For You (1969)
- Easy Action (1970)
- Love It to Death (1971)
- Killer (1971)
- School's Out (1972)
- Billion Dollar Babies (1973)
- Muscle of Love (1973)
- Alice Cooper's Greatest Hits (1974)
- Welcome 2 My Nightmare (2011)
- Paranormal (2017)
- Live From The Astroturf (2018)
- Detroit Stories (2021)
- The Revenge of Alice Cooper (2025)

== Bibliography ==
- Michael Bruce; Billy James (2000). No More Mr. Nice Guy: The Inside Story of the Original Alice Cooper Group. SAF Publishing Ltd. ISBN 0-946719-32-2.
- Bob Greene (1974). Billion Dollar Baby. Simon & Schuster. ISBN 978-0-689-10616-3.
