= Alice Cooper (band) =

American rock band

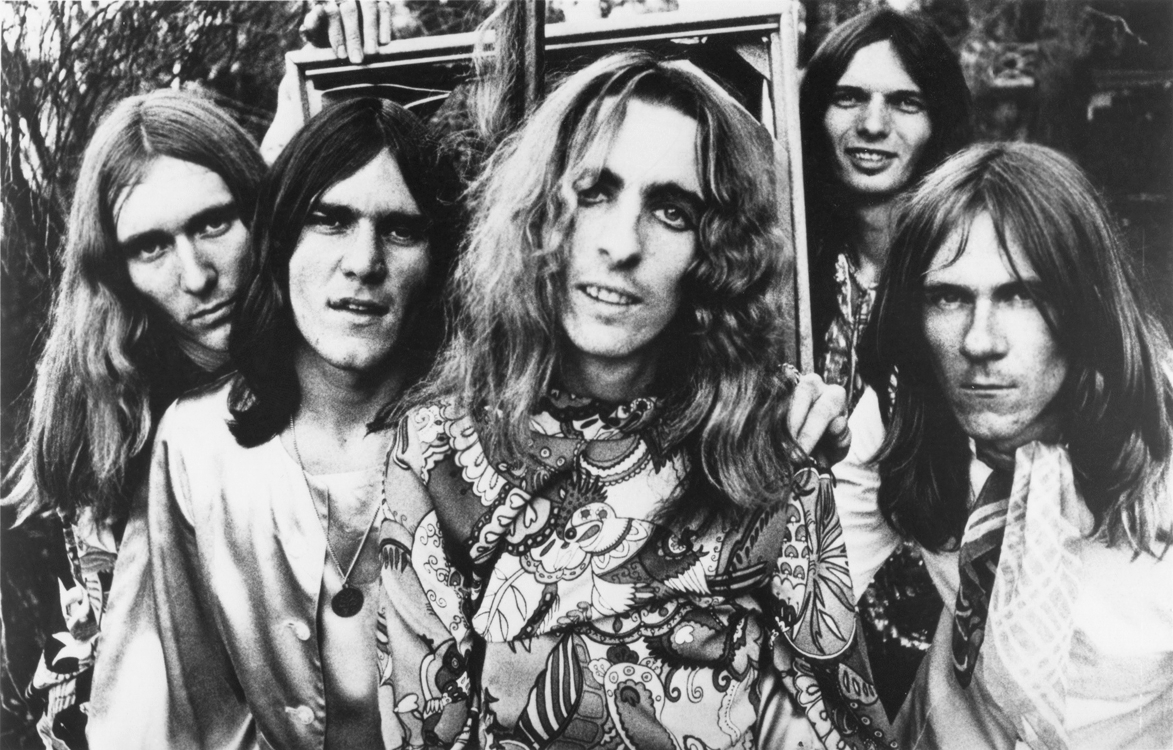
- Alice Cooper band in 1969. L-R: Neal Smith, Michael Bruce, Vincent Furnier, Dennis Dunaway, Glen Buxton

Background information
- Also known as: Alice Cooper Band; Alice Cooper Group
- Origin: Phoenix, Arizona, U.S.
- Genres: Hard rock; glam rock; shock rock; psychedelic rock (early)
- Years active: 1968–1975; 1999; 2010; 2011; 2015; 2017; 2025–present
- Labels: Straight; Warner Bros.; earMusic
- Spinoffs: Billion Dollar Babies
- Spinoff of: The Spiders
- Members: Alice Cooper; Michael Bruce; Dennis Dunaway; Neal Smith
- Website: alicecooper.com

Alice Cooper, also known as the Alice Cooper Group or the Alice Cooper Band, is an American rock band formed in Phoenix, Arizona, in 1968. During their original run, the band consisted of lead singer Vincent Furnier (who adopted the stage name Alice Cooper), lead guitarist Glen Buxton, rhythm guitarist and keyboardist Michael Bruce, bassist Dennis Dunaway, and drummer Neal Smith. The band was notorious for their elaborate, theatrical shock rock stage shows.

The Alice Cooper band was one of the few glam rock acts to achieve mainstream popularity in the United States, rising to fame in 1971 with the hit single "I'm Eighteen" from their third album, Love It to Death. Success continued with the US top 10 and UK No. 1 single "School's Out" from the album of the same name (1972). The band peaked in popularity in 1973 with their sixth album Billion Dollar Babies, which topped the charts in the US and UK and produced three UK top 10 singles. The supporting tour broke box-office records previously held by the Rolling Stones.

The band split up in 1974. Furnier legally changed his name to Alice Cooper and began a successful solo career. In 2011, the original Alice Cooper band was inducted into the Rock and Roll Hall of Fame. Between 1999 and 2021, there were occasional reunions of the band before reuniting in 2025 for their first studio album in 52 years, The Revenge of Alice Cooper.

== History ==
=== Formative years: The Spiders ===
The Spiders

Background information
- Origin: Phoenix, Arizona, U.S.
- Genres: Garage rock; rock and roll; proto-punk
- Years active: 1964–1968
- Past members: Vincent Furnier; Dennis Dunaway; Glen Buxton; John Tatum; John Speer; Michael Bruce; Mike Hughes; Neal Smith

In 1964, 16-year-old Furnier, then a student at Cortez High School, was eager to participate in the local annual Letterman's talent show, so he gathered four teammates from his high school's cross-country team to form a group for the show: Glen Buxton, Dennis Dunaway, John Tatum and John Speer. They named themselves the Earwigs. They dressed up in costumes and wigs to resemble the Beatles, and performed several parodies of Beatles songs, with the lyrics modified to refer to the track team: in their rendition of "Please Please Me", for example, the line "Last night I said these words to my girl" was replaced with "Last night I ran four laps for my coach". Of the group, only Buxton and Tatum knew how to play an instrument—the guitar—so Buxton and Tatum played guitars while the rest mimed on their instruments. The group got an overwhelming response from the audience and won the talent show. As a result of their positive experience, the group decided to try to turn into a real band. They acquired musical instruments from a local pawn shop, and proceeded to learn how to play them, with Buxton doing most of the teaching, as well as much of the early songwriting. They soon renamed themselves the Spiders, featuring Furnier on vocals, Buxton on lead guitar, Tatum on rhythm guitar, Dunaway on bass guitar, and Speer on drums. Musically, the group was inspired by artists such as the Beatles, the Rolling Stones, the Who, the Kinks, the Doors, and the Yardbirds. For the next year the band performed regularly around the Phoenix area with a huge black spider's web as their backdrop, the group's first stage prop.

In 1965, the Spiders recorded their first single, "Why Don't You Love Me". The single's B-side track was the Marvin Gaye Tamla Records hit, "Hitch Hike". The single was released by local record label, Mascot Records, owned by Jack Curtis, a concert promoter who also owned the Stage 7 teen club which later became the VIP Club where the Spiders were the house band. At the VIP Club the band supported bands including the Lovin' Spoonful, the Yardbirds, Them, the Animals, the Kinks and the Byrds.

In 1966, the Spiders graduated from high school and after North High School footballer Michael Bruce replaced John Tatum on rhythm guitar, the band released their second single, "Don't Blow Your Mind", an original composition which became a local number one hit, backed by "No Price Tag". The single was recorded at Copper State Recording Studio and issued by local micro-imprint, Santa Cruz Records.

By 1967, the band had begun to make regular road trips to Los Angeles to play shows. They soon renamed themselves Nazz and released the single "Wonder Who's Lovin' Her Now", backed with future Alice Cooper track "Lay Down and Die, Goodbye". Around this time, drummer John Speer was replaced by Neal Smith. By the end of the year, the band had relocated to Los Angeles. In Los Angeles, the band's lifestyle involved regular car trips into the desert. Activities included shooting rabbits with a 0.22 rifle. In 1967, Neal Smith moved into the range of Furnier's rifle as the latter was about to fire. Smith was hit in the ankle. He has the fragment in his ankle to this day. Around this time, the band and three others were driving in Los Angeles in a van. An incident on the road caused the driver to lose control of the van and it went off the road rolling over four times. The van was destroyed, but all band members and the three other passengers survived without serious injury.

=== New band name: Alice Cooper ===
In 1968, the band learned that Todd Rundgren also had a band called the Nazz, and found themselves in need of another stage name. Furnier also believed that the group needed a gimmick to succeed, and that other bands were not exploiting the showmanship potential of the stage. The legend is that the name "Alice Cooper" came from a session with a Ouija board, largely chosen because it sounded innocuous and wholesome, in humorous contrast to the band's image and music. However, in an interview with Mark Radcliffe on the Radcliffe and Maconie show on BBC Radio 2 on November 30, 2009, Vince Furnier described the incident with the ouija board as an urban legend. He said "We literally got that whole story about the witch thing the way you guys got it. It was like just pure urban legend. I heard about the witch thing probably the same day you did, but it was a great story." Eventually Furnier adopted this stage name as his own from 1969 onwards, being referred to as Alice Cooper on the cover of the band's debut album. He recalled:

We were called the Nazz and we found out about Todd Rundgren's band who were called the Nazz. So I said let's not come up with a name that's dark, because they're expecting that. I said, "What if we sounded like we were somebody's aunt?" It was kind of like the all-American, sweet little old lady name. And I wasn't Alice Cooper. I was just the singer in the band Alice Cooper, like Manfred Mann. Pretty soon everybody called me Alice, they just assumed that the singer's name was Alice. So, at that point, I legally changed my name to Alice Cooper. It was a total outrage at the time. Now it's a household name.

The singer considers the name change one of his most important and successful career moves.

The classic Alice Cooper group line-up consisted of Furnier, lead guitarist Glen Buxton, rhythm guitarist/keyboardist Michael Bruce, bassist Dennis Dunaway and drummer Neal Smith – all former members of the Spiders. This lineup stayed intact through 1974.

The band's first gig that used the name Alice Cooper was on March 16, 1968, at Earl Warren Fairgrounds in Santa Barbara. The posters still showed the band as the Nazz. After a 1968 gig at the Cheetah club in Venice, California, where most of the club's patrons left after hearing the band play just ten minutes, they were approached by music manager Shep Gordon, who saw the band's negative impact that night as a force that could be turned in a more productive direction. Shep arranged an audition for the band with renowned musical artist and record producer Frank Zappa, who was looking to sign bizarre music acts to his new record label, Straight Records. Zappa told them to come to his house "at 7 o'clock" for an audition. The band mistakenly assumed he meant 7 o'clock in the morning. Being woken up by a band willing to play that particular brand of music at seven in the morning impressed Zappa enough for him to sign them to a three-album deal. "Frank was the only one who stuck out his neck for us, for me," recalled Furnier himself. "He was the one who said, 'Here's a band that everybody in the business is laughing at – I like 'em.' ... He was the outcast in L.A. and so were we." The first three Alice Cooper albums were released on Zappa's Straight label.

Another Zappa-signed act, the all-female GTOs, were encouraged to dress up the Alice Cooper band members in women's clothing and heavy makeup, and played a major role in developing the band's early onstage look.

In June 1969, Alice Cooper released its first album, Pretties for You, which barely cracked the Billboard Top 200 albums chart at No. 193. The band was the subject of media criticism after Furnier threw a live chicken into the audience during the 1969 Toronto Rock 'n' Roll Revival Festival. The audience ripped the chicken, whose name was Dutchess, to shreds.

In March 1970, the band released the album Easy Action, which did not chart. Also in 1970, the band had two songs ("Titanic Overture" and "Refrigerator Heaven") that appeared on a Warner Bros sampler album, Zapped, featuring acts produced by Zappa.

=== Finding success ===
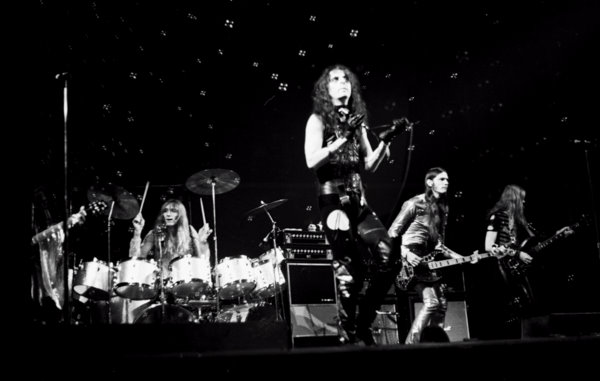
The band touring for Killer, 1972

Slow sales of the band's first two albums, as well as Californians' indifference to their act, led the band to relocate again in 1970, this time to Pontiac, Michigan near Furnier's original home town of Detroit. Here, their bizarre stage act was much better received by Midwestern crowds accustomed to the proto punk styles of local bands such as the Stooges and the MC5. "L.A. just didn't get it," Furnier stated. "They were all on the wrong drug for us. They were on acid and we were basically drinking beer. We fit much more in Detroit than we did anywhere else."

Hooking up with young producer Bob Ezrin, Alice Cooper released the single "I'm Eighteen" in November 1970, and it became a surprise Top 40 hit by early 1971. The single's success convinced Warner Bros that the band could be a viable commercial act, leading to much stronger investment in the third Alice Cooper album, Love It to Death. The album was initially released on Straight Records, but was reissued on the Warner label following its buyout of the imprint from Zappa, giving Alice Cooper even greater exposure. Under Ezrin's direction, the band's sound moved from psychedelic rock to a tighter, guitar-driven hard rock sound, even as much of the lyrical content continued to explore "decadence, perversion and psychosis."

In 1971 the band was doing its first headliner tour. Backstage at a gig in Florida, a young woman came in with a boa constrictor coiled around her arm. This gave Furnier a fright, and after experiencing this kind of reaction, the idea of using a snake in the stage performance began. With Love It to Death and its follow-up album Killer both charting well, the band was able to afford a more elaborate stage show, including sophisticated props and elements of gothic horror, and they became a highly popular concert attraction in the US and UK over the next few years. Calls by members of British Parliament in 1972 to have the group banned from performing in the UK only solidified the band's legend, and the next year's Billion Dollar Babies tour broke box office records. Cindy Dunaway (Neal Smith's sister who married Dennis Dunaway) designed the band's costumes and occasionally performed in the stage show (she was the "dancing tooth" on the Billion Dollar Babies tour). A 1973 gig in São Paulo, Brazil, was performed in front of 158,000 people. The Guinness Book of World Records gave the band the world record for playing in front of the biggest indoor audience ever.

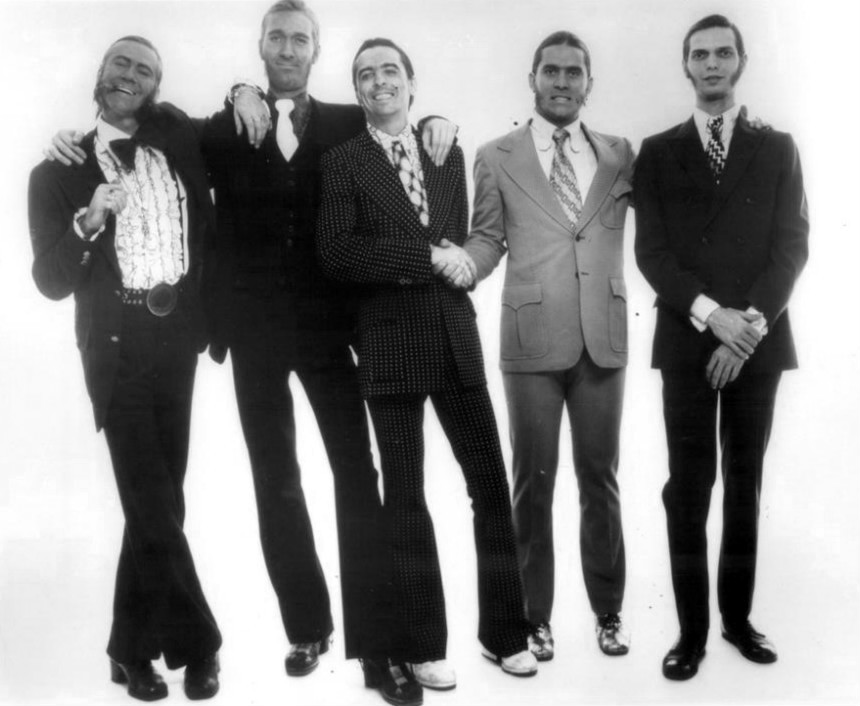
Alice Cooper band in 1973

Following Killer, Alice Cooper released three more top ten albums. The song "School's Out" (1972) from the album of the same name became the band's highest-charting single, reaching #7 in the US, #3 in Canada and #1 in the UK. The pinnacle of the band's success was 1973's Billion Dollar Babies which rose all the way to No. 1 on both the US and UK album charts. The band headlined highly successful tours from 1972 to 1974, before breaking up. The band made so much money in 1973 that Furnier appeared on the cover of an April 1973 issue of Forbes Magazine. The article listed him among the highest-earning American "music superstars": "Lounging in a $160-a-day Beverly Hills Hotel suite, Alice Cooper, who's a he, ..."

=== Breakup of the original band ===
The original Alice Cooper band played their final show on April 8, 1974, in Rio de Janeiro, Brazil. There are varying reasons former band members have given for the breakup. Smith said the members wanted to take a year off to slow down and possibly do solo projects, and just never reunited. Cooper said there was disagreement over how much money to sink back into stage shows, which had become costly. Bruce contends that Buxton's issues with substance abuse, which at one time led him to pull a switchblade on the band's tour manager, likely hastened the breakup.

The breakup was made public in 1975. Vincent Furnier continued using his stage name "Alice Cooper", carrying on with a new group of musicians. He also adopted the name legally. Bruce, Dunaway and Smith would go on to form the short-lived band Billion Dollar Babies, producing one album – Battle Axe – in 1977.

=== 2010–present: Reunions and The Revenge of Alice Cooper ===
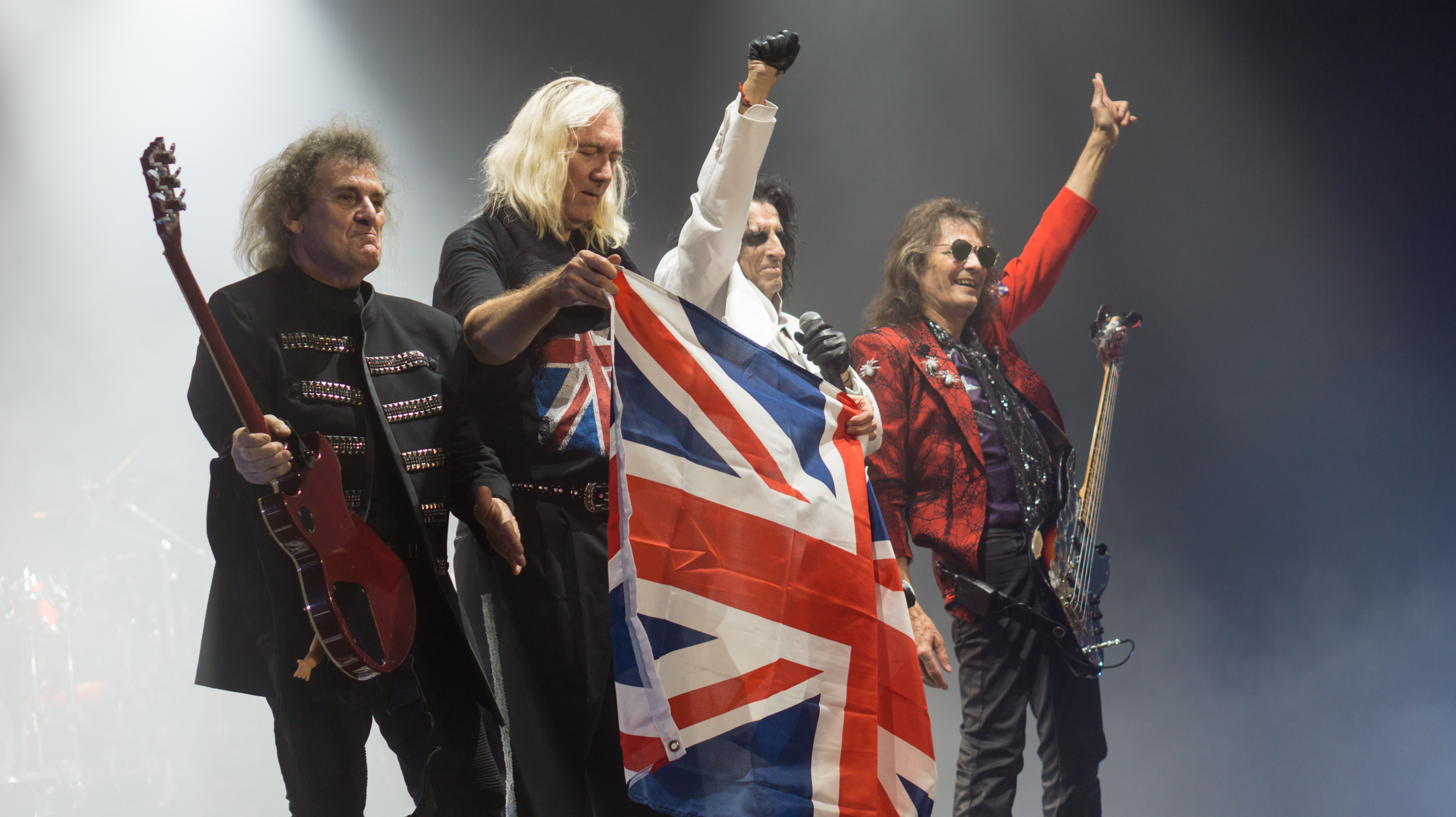
The four surviving original members of Alice Cooper at Wembley Arena in November 2017. L-R: Michael Bruce, Neal Smith, Alice Cooper, Dennis Dunaway

While occasionally performing with one another and Glen Buxton, they would not reunite with Alice until October 23, 1999, at the second Glen Buxton Memorial Weekend for a show at CoopersTown in Phoenix (Buxton having died in 1997). They reunited for another show, with Steve Hunter on guitar, on December 16, 2010, at the Dodge Theatre in Phoenix. This lineup would perform together again (televised) on March 14, 2011, at the induction of the original Alice Cooper group into the Rock and Roll Hall of Fame, as well as on May 11, 2011, at London's Battersea Power Station at the Jägermeister Ice Cold 4D event (webcast). Bruce, Dunaway and Smith appeared on three tracks they co-wrote on Alice's 2011 album Welcome 2 My Nightmare.

A documentary about the band entitled Super Duper Alice Cooper premiered at the Tribeca Film Festival on April 17, 2014, and was scheduled to be screened at the Hot Docs Canadian International Documentary Festival a week later.

On October 6, 2015, a surprise reunion show took place in Dallas at Dunaway's book signing session. He was joined by Bruce, Smith, Cooper and Ryan Roxie, who replaced the late Glen Buxton. The surviving members of the band were set to record and release an album. However, the only material to surface was two bonus tracks on Cooper's 27th studio album Paranormal.

The four surviving original members reunited again for a five-song set on May 14, 2017, at a show in Nashville, Tennessee. The four reunited yet again later that same year for a UK tour.

In 2021, the surviving members of the band reunited for Cooper's Detroit Stories album. Producer Bob Ezrin as well as Cooper himself have said that a new album with the surviving members would be possible.

On April 19, 2025, it was announced that Alice Cooper had reunited with Michael Bruce, Dennis Dunaway, and Neal Smith for the band's first studio album together in 52 years, The Revenge of Alice Cooper. Released on July 25 via earMusic, the album was produced by Bob Ezrin and includes previously unreleased contributions by original guitarist Glen Buxton.

== Musical style ==
Alice Cooper's music is typically seen as "sleazy" and "gritty but anthemic" hard rock, but also as glam rock, shock rock, heavy metal, glam punk, proto-punk and rock 'n' roll. Their first two albums, Pretties for You and Easy Action, have a psychedelic rock, acid rock, and experimental rock sound, more fitting for their then-label, Frank Zappa's Straight Records, but on Love It to Death, they transitioned to a "motor city garage rock" style, that continued on Killer and Muscle of Love. Alice Cooper are seen as precursors to punk rock, but also influenced hard rock, glam rock, heavy metal, new wave, gothic rock and the bands Sex Pistols, Nine Inch Nails, Ramones, New York Dolls, Guns N' Roses, Devo, Cheap Trick, Ozzy Osbourne, The Cramps, Kiss, Plasmatics, Misfits, White Zombie and Marilyn Manson.

Alice Cooper took inspiration from 50s and 60s rock, such as Elvis Presley, Chuck Berry, The Beatles, The Rolling Stones, The Who, The Yardbirds, Love, The Doors, Jim Morrison, Pink Floyd and The Beach Boys, but also proto-punk, such as MC5 and The Stooges. Many people over the years have brought up Arthur Brown and Screaming Lord Sutch as obvious influences, but this has never been confirmed by the band.

== Band members ==
Current line-up

- Alice Cooper – lead vocals, harmonica (1968–1975, 1999, 2010, 2011, 2015, 2017, 2025-present)
- Michael Bruce – rhythm guitar, keyboards, backing vocals (1968–1975, 1999, 2010, 2011, 2015, 2017, 2025-present)
- Dennis Dunaway – bass, backing vocals (1968–1975, 1999, 2010, 2011, 2015, 2017, 2025-present)
- Neal Smith – drums, backing vocals (1968–1975, 1999, 2010, 2011, 2015, 2017, 2025-present)

Former members

- Glen Buxton – lead guitar (1968–1975; died 1997)
- Mick Mashbir – rhythm guitar (1973–1974)
- Bob Dolin – keyboards, backing vocals (1973–1974)
- Steve Hunter – lead guitar (2010, 2011)
- Ryan Roxie – lead guitar (2015, 2017)

== Discography ==
Studio albums

- Pretties for You (1969)
- Easy Action (1970)
- Love It to Death (1971)
- Killer (1971)
- School's Out (1972)
- Billion Dollar Babies (1973)
- Muscle of Love (1973)
- The Revenge of Alice Cooper (2025)

Compilations

- School Days: The Early Recordings (1973)
- Greatest Hits (1974)

== Sources ==
- Hoffmann, Frank, ed. (2005). Encyclopedia of Recorded Sound. Routledge. ISBN 0-415-93835-X.
- Mojo (2007). The Mojo Collection: The Ultimate Music Companion (4th ed.). Canongate Books. ISBN 978-1-8419-5973-3.
- Phillips, William; Cogan, Brian (2009). Encyclopedia of Heavy Metal Music. Greenwood Press. ISBN 978-0-313-34800-6.
