= Pete Prown =

American musician and writer

Pete Prown (born 1963) is an American writer and magazine editor, painter, guitarist, and music journalist. He has worked as the editor-in-chief of Guitar Shop magazine and music editor for Vintage Guitar. His writing has also appeared in publications such as Guitar Player, Guitar One, Guitar for the Practicing Musician, Car Stereo Review, Musician's Planet, InTune Monthly, Music Alive, and Philadelphia Magazine.

From 1993 to 1998 Prown was the editor in chief of the international magazine Guitar Shop, followed by his role as a music editor at Vintage Guitar. From 1998 to 2013, Pete Prown was also editor of the gardening magazine Green Scene for the Pennsylvania Horticultural Society, based in Philadelphia. He has also edited several books (such as Jane Godshalk's Flower Arranging Secrets), and is an accomplished photographer and communicator.

== Works ==
=== Music ===
- Guitar Garden - China Rose (2006)
- Guitar Garden - Secret Space (2007)
- Sir Clive & the Raging Cartographers - Guitar Safari (2009)
- Guitar Garden - Guitar Garden III (2011)
- Oval Planet - Trench Poems (2019)
- Gordon/Prown/King - Moorish Code (2020)

=== Books ===
Non-fiction

- Modal Riffs for Rock Guitar (1995)
- Legends of Rock Guitar (co-written with HP Newquist, 1997)
- Gear Secrets of the Guitar Legends (co-written with Lisa Sharken, 2003)
- Shred! The Ultimate Guide to Warp-Speed Guitar (co-written with Rich Maloof, 2006)
- Ultimate Heavy Metal Guitars (Quarto Motorbooks, 2023)

Fiction

- Thimble Down (2013)
- Devils & Demons (2014)
- The Lost Ones (2016)
- Master Black (2017)
