= Mick Mashbir =

American guitarist

Mick Mashbir is a guitarist who played on Alice Cooper's Billion Dollar Babies and Muscle of Love albums. Mick also played on both tours. 1978, he toured with Flo & Eddie of Frank Zappa's band. In 1985, he played with The Turtles. In 2006, he released his solo album Keepin the in Vibe Alive. In 2025 he released another solo album on YouTube, Strungout On Strings which included the single American Weirdo.
