= Pretties for You =

Pretties For You

Studio album by Alice Cooper
- Released: June 25, 1969
- Recorded: November 1968
- Studios: Whitney Studios, Los Angeles
- Genres: Hard rock; psychedelic rock; acid rock; art rock; experimental rock
- Length: 38:10
- Label: Straight
- Producers: Ian Underwood, Herb Cohen, Frank Zappa, Alice Cooper

Alice Cooper chronology
Pretties For You (1969)	Easy Action (1970)

Singles from Pretties for You
- 1. "Reflected" Released: May 19, 1969

Pretties For You is the debut studio album by American rock band Alice Cooper, released on June 25, 1969, by Straight Records. "Alice Cooper" referred to the band and not its lead singer Vincent Furnier, although he also used the band's name as a stage name. The album has a more progressive and psychedelic style to it and the group had yet to develop the more concise hard rock sound that they would become famous for.

Produced by Furnier along with Frank Zappa, his manager, Herb Cohen and his fellow Mother of Invention, Ian Underwood, most of the tracks feature unusual time signatures and arrangements, jarring syncopation, expressive dynamics, sound effects, and an eclectic range of music influences. A few songs, such as "Levity Ball", show the influence of Syd Barrett-era Pink Floyd, with whom the band hung out during the British group's U.S. tour. Alice Cooper guitarist Glen Buxton stated he could listen to Barrett's guitar playing for hours on end.

The artwork for this album is a painting by Edward Beardsley. It was originally hanging on the wall of the living room in Zappa's house, and his wife Gail stated that it was later stolen from them.

Pretties for You was a critical and commercial failure, briefly appearing on the Billboard Top 200, and none of its songs have ever been played live by Cooper since the release of the band's breakthrough album Love It to Death. The song "Reflected", Alice Cooper's first single, was later rewritten as "Elected", which features on their 1973 album Billion Dollar Babies.

== Production ==
According to Alice Cooper's band manager Shep Gordon, when recording at Whitney Studios in Burbank, Frank Zappa left his brother in charge of recording while Zappa left the studio. Zappa returned later that day and informed them the album was finished, having only recorded the band rehearsing. Gordon states that there was no producer during recording, that the band had no complete songs written, that Zappa "didn't spend 5 minutes in the studio" and never asked to hear their material, and that the band's debut album was made up entirely of that rehearsal recording, aside from the live recording of "Levity Ball".

== Reception ==
In a 1969 review of Pretties for You for Rolling Stone, music journalist and critic Lester Bangs felt that "there are none of the gross, ugly, idiotic juxtapositions of the totally incongruous found in much other studio-assembled art-rock. But neither is there any hint of life, spontaneity, joy, rage, or any kind of authentic passion or conviction." However, he stated that "within the context of [Alice Cooper's] self-imposed limitations, the album is listenable." He concluded the review by saying that "Alice Cooper's music is, for this reviewer at any rate, totally dispensable."

Pretties for You won an award in Germany for "Best Arranged Album of 1969".

AllMusic's Stephen Thomas Erlewine feels that the album "was an earnest but flawed stab at psychedelia that occasionally caught fire".

== Track listing ==
All tracks are written by Alice Cooper, Glen Buxton, Michael Bruce, Dennis Dunaway and Neal Smith.

Side one
No.	Title	Length
1.	"Titanic Overture" (Instrumental)	1:12
2.	"10 Minutes Before the Worm"	1:39
3.	"Sing Low, Sweet Cheerio"	5:42
4.	"Today Mueller"	1:48
5.	"Living"	3:12
6.	"Fields of Regret"	5:44

Side two
No.	Title	Length
7.	"No Longer Umpire"	2:02
8.	"Levity Ball"	4:39
9.	"B.B. on Mars"	1:17
10.	"Reflected"	3:17
11.	"Apple Bush"	3:08
12.	"Earwigs to Eternity"	1:19
13.	"Changing Arranging"	3:03

== Live covers ==
On November 8, 2015, the entire record was performed live at The Stone in NYC as part of Nick Didkovsky's residency there. Neal Smith, Dennis Dunaway and Cindy Smith Dunaway were in attendance. Dennis Dunaway joined the band for "Nobody Likes Me" as an encore, a song that was originally slated to be on the record.

== Personnel ==
Alice Cooper band

- Vincent Furnier – lead vocals, harmonica
- Glen Buxton – lead guitar
- Michael Bruce – rhythm guitar, backing vocals, keyboards
- Dennis Dunaway – bass guitar, backing vocals
- Neal Smith – drums, backing vocals

== Charts ==
Chart (1969)	Peak position
US Billboard 200	193
