= Neal Smith (drummer) =

American musician

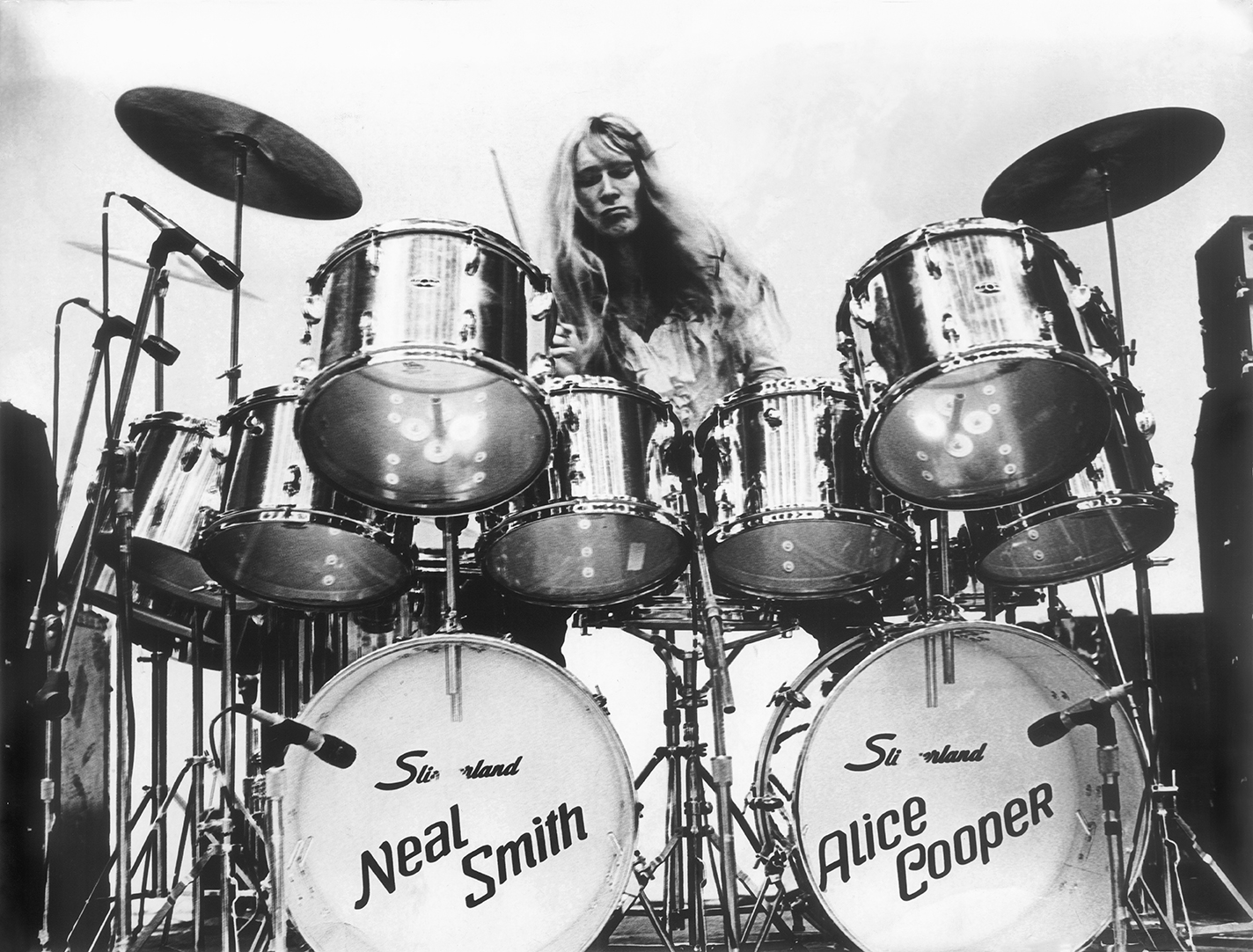
- Neal Smith at his 22 chrome Slingerland. Photo taken by Carl Dunn in 1972 at the "School's Out" concert at the Memorial Auditorium in Dallas Texas.

Background information
- Born: September 23, 1947 (age 79); Akron, Ohio, U.S.
- Genres: Rock, hard rock, heavy metal
- Occupations: Musician, songwriter
- Instruments: Drums, percussion, guitar, vocals
- Website: http://nealsmithrocks.com/

Neal Smith (born September 23, 1947) is an American musician, best known as the drummer for the rock group Alice Cooper from 1967 to 1974. He performed on the group's early albums Pretties for You and Easy Action, their breakout album Love It to Death and the subsequent successful albums Killer, School's Out, and Billion Dollar Babies. The last new studio album with the five original Alice Cooper group members participating in new music was Muscle of Love in 1973. The original group's Greatest Hits studio album was released in 1974. In 2018 (fifty years after the original group debuted its new group name Alice Cooper in 1968), a live performance album Live from the Astroturf recorded in 2015 was released, featuring four of the original group members performing eight of their hit songs, with long-time Alice Cooper solo band guitarist and friend Ryan Roxie interplaying lead guitar parts with original group rhythm guitarist Michael Bruce, on behalf of original group lead guitarist Glen Buxton, who died in 1997 of pneumonia at age 49.

In 2011, Smith was inducted into the Rock and Roll Hall of Fame, in the "Performer" category, as a member of the original Alice Cooper group.

== Music career ==
Smith graduated in 1965 from Camelback High School in Phoenix, while three of his Alice Cooper band members graduated from Cortez High School and one from North High School. Smith talks about his high school in the song "Alma Mater" sung by Alice Cooper. Neal Smith's drum part on the title track of Billion Dollar Babies is considered one of the most original and dynamic amongst musicians and fans of the group.

Billion Dollar Babies was also the name of the band founded by former Alice Cooper group musicians Michael Bruce, Dennis Dunaway and Neal Smith along with Bob Dolin and Mike Marconi after they split from Alice Cooper in 1974. This band was embroiled in a legal suit over the usage of the name. They released only one album, 1977's Battle Axe, before disbanding.

Smith has been selling real estate in New England since the early 1980s. He is also still active in music, and performed with Alice Cooper during a show in 1998. In 1999, he released his first solo album, Platinum God, recorded in 1975. He is also currently the drummer/percussionist and songwriter for Bouchard, Dunaway & Smith (BDS), composed of Smith, former Blue Öyster Cult bassist Joe Bouchard, and original Alice Cooper bassist Dennis Dunaway. The band has co-written songs with Ian Hunter. BDS has released two albums: 2001's Back From Hell, and 2003's BDS Live In Paris. Smith has also released two albums under the group name Cinematik, with guitarist Robert Mitchell and bassist Peter Catucci, produced by Rob Fraboni. Cinematik has a loose, jam-laden world-beat sound, as opposed to BDS's more classic-rock sound.

Smith has also recorded with Buck Dharma of Blue Öyster Cult (Flat Out, 1982), Plasmatics (Beyond the Valley of 1984, 1981), and Deadringer (Electrocution of the Heart, 1989). Neal played on Bruce Cameron's CD Midnight Daydream along with an all-star cast of Jack Bruce, Buddy Miles, Billy Cox, Mitch Mitchell, Harvy Dalton Arnold and Ken Hensley. Neal Smith also has an industrial rock project called Killsmith. Killsmith's sophomore release underway makes Neal Smith set to be the first member of the original Alice Cooper Group to have a project of original material released after the group's induction to the Rock 'n' Roll Hall of Fame.

On July 1, 2010 when talking about the album, Welcome 2 My Nightmare, Alice Cooper said in a Radio Metal interview: "We’ll put some of the original people on it and add some new people, I’m very happy with working with Bob (Ezrin) again." Musicians who appeared on the album included Rob Zombie, Vince Gill, Steven Hunter and Dick Wagner. Smith, Dennis Dunaway and Michael Bruce played on 3 songs on the album, and Smith co-wrote the song "I'll Bite Your Face Off".

In 2015, Smith played drums on the Hollywood Vampires cover of "School's Out / Another Brick in the Wall part 2" on the album Hollywood Vampires.

He featured on two tracks on Cooper's 2021 album Detroit Stories.

The Alice Cooper Band reunited in 2025 for a new album, The Revenge of Alice Cooper.

== Personal ==
Neal Smith's sister, Cindy, married Alice Cooper bassist Dennis Dunaway. She often performed in the band's stage shows.

== Discography ==
Solo

- Platinum God (1999)
- Cinematik (2001)
- Cinematik: One Full Moon Away (2002)
- Killsmith: Sexual Savior (2008)
- Killsmith Two (2011)
- Killsmith & The Greenfire Empire (2014)

With Alice Cooper

- Pretties for You (1969)
- Easy Action (1970)
- Love It to Death (1971)
- Killer (1971)
- School's Out (1972)
- Billion Dollar Babies (1973)
- Muscle of Love (1973)
- 1969 Live at the Whisky A Go-Go (1992)
- Welcome 2 My Nightmare (2011)
- Paranormal (2017)
- Detroit Stories (2021)
- The Revenge of Alice Cooper (2025)

With Billion Dollar Babies

- Battle Axe (1977)

With Plasmatics

- Beyond the Valley of 1984 (1981)

With Buck Dharma

- Flat Out (1982)

With Deadringer

- Electrocution of the Heart (1989)

With Ant-Bee

- Lunar Muzik (1997)

With Bruce Cameron

- Midnight Daydream (1999)

With Bouchard, Dunaway & Smith

- Back From Hell (2001)
- BDS Live in Paris (2003)

With Hollywood Vampires

- Hollywood Vampires (2015)
