= Dennis Dunaway =

American musician

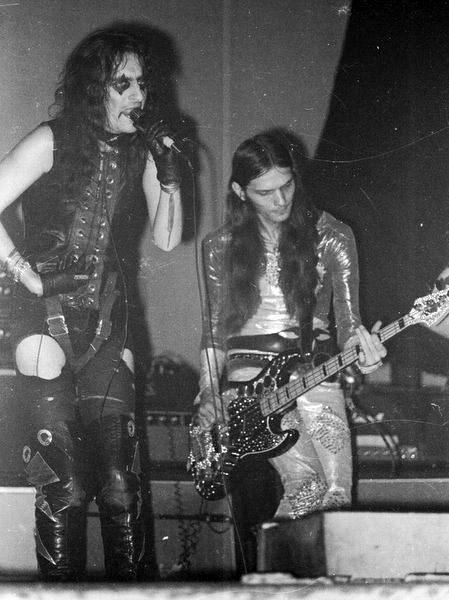
- Dennis Dunaway (right) with singer Alice Cooper

Background information
- Born: December 9, 1946 (age 79); Cottage Grove, Oregon
- Genres: Rock, hard rock, shock rock
- Occupations: Musician, songwriter
- Instrument: Bass

Dennis Dunaway (born December 9, 1946) is an American musician, best known as the original bass guitarist for the rock band Alice Cooper. He co-wrote some of the band's most notable songs, including "I'm Eighteen" and "School's Out".

== Career ==
Dunaway's first bass was a short-scale Airline. This was used on Alice Cooper's debut album Pretties for You. The band's sophomore album, Easy Action, featured Dunaway playing a short-scale Höfner.

Later, Dunaway procured a Gibson EB-0 short scale bass, modified with a Fender Precision Bass split pickup in the treble position, that he spray painted green and called "the frog". He can be seen with it on the back cover of the Love it to Death album. Dunaway used this bass exclusively in the making of the original Alice Cooper group's first three albums. It currently is on loan to the Rock and Roll Hall of Fame. Dunaway would later switch to a Fender Jazz bass.

Michael Bruce, Mike Marconi, Dennis Dunaway, Bob Dolin, and Neal Smith started a group called Billion Dollar Babies after they left Alice Cooper in 1974. This band was embroiled in a legal suit over the usage of the name. They only released one album, 1977's Battle Axe, before disbanding.

Dennis is married to Cindy (Smith) Dunaway, Alice Cooper's original costume designer who helped create the Shock Rock fashion style. Cindy is the sister of original Alice Cooper drummer Neal Smith.

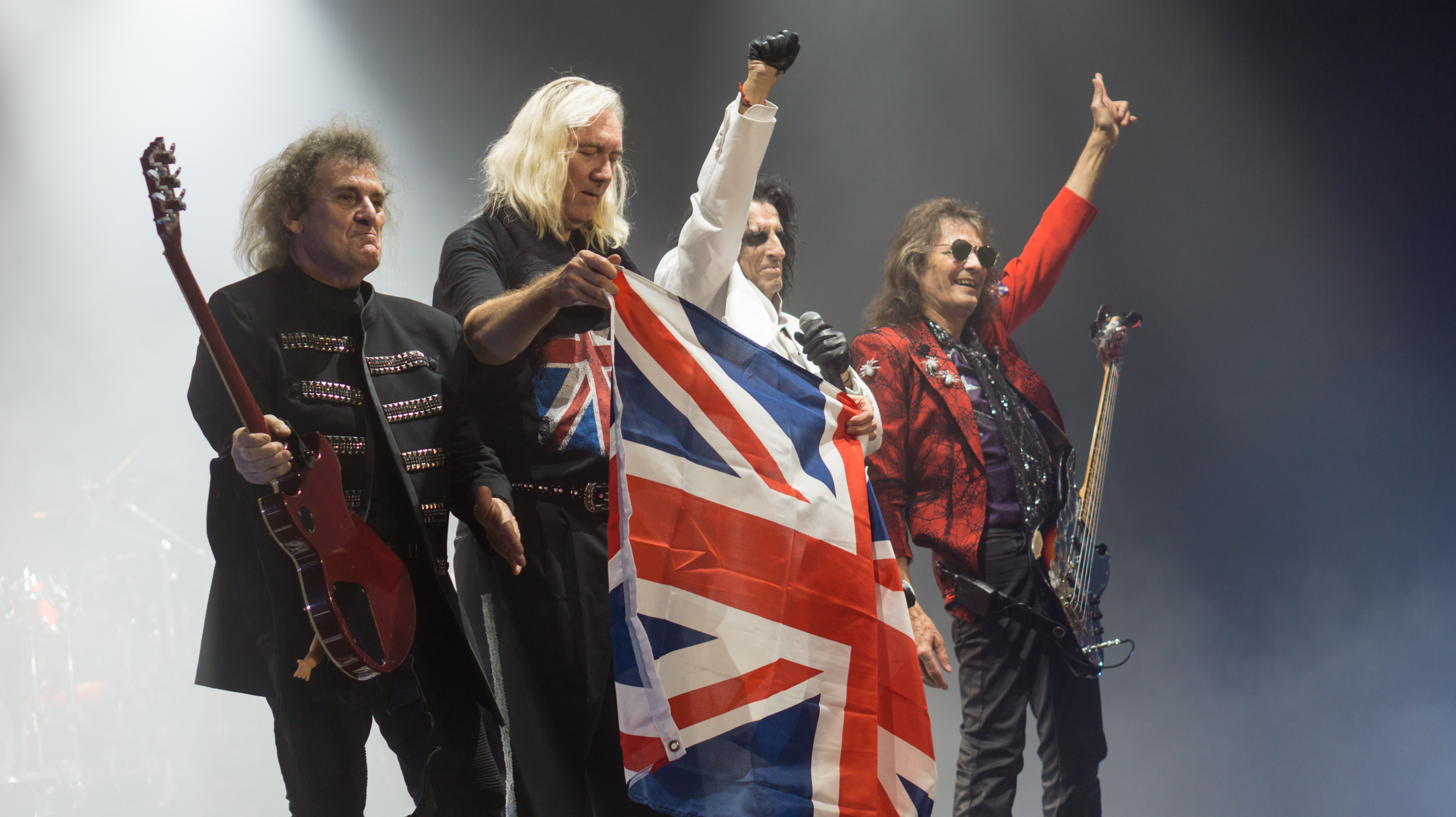
Dunaway (far right) and the three surviving original Alice Cooper band members at Wembley Arena in 2017

Dennis performs on Alice Cooper's Welcome 2 My Nightmare. On July 1, 2010, when talking about the newly retitled album, Welcome 2 My Nightmare, Alice said in a Radio Metal interview: "We’ll put some of the original people on it and add some new people, I’m very happy with working with Bob (Ezrin) again." Other names mentioned were: Slash, Neal Smith, Dennis Dunaway, Steven Hunter and Dick Wagner. Dunaway and Smith wrote two songs and perform, along with Michael Bruce, on three tracks on the album, released in September 2011. That same year, Dunaway and his former Alice Cooper bandmates were inducted into the Rock and Roll Hall of Fame, in the "Performer Category".

Dennis currently plays with his group Blue Coupe, which also includes Joe and Albert Bouchard of Blue Öyster Cult, and his group 5th Avenue Vampires. Blue Coupe's most recent single "You (Like Vampires)", written by John Elwood Cook, can be heard on iTunes or Pledgemusic. Dennis released his memoirs Snakes! Guillotines! Electric Chairs! (Thomas Dunne Books) in June 2015. The book has been penned with Rolling Stone writer, Chris Hodenfield.

Dunaway appears on bonus tracks for Alice Cooper's 2017 album Paranormal and on two songs of Cooper's 2021 album Detroit Stories. He also co-wrote the Detroit Stories track "Drunk and in Love".

In 2022, Dunaway wrote the afterword to Alice Cooper Confidential by authorized Alice Cooper biographer Jeffrey Morgan.

== Discography ==
Solo (billed as Dennis Dunaway Project)

- Bones from the Yard (2006)

With Alice Cooper

- Pretties for You (1969)
- Easy Action (1970)
- Love It to Death (1971)
- Killer (1971)
- School's Out (1972)
- Billion Dollar Babies (1973)
- Muscle of Love (1973)
- 1969 Live at the Whisky A Go-Go (1994)
- Welcome 2 My Nightmare (2011)
- Paranormal (2017)
- Detroit Stories (2021)
- The Revenge of Alice Cooper (2025)

With Billion Dollar Babies

- Battle Axe (1977)

With Deadringer

- Electrocution of the Heart (1989)

With Ant-Bee

- Lunar Muzik (1997)

With Bouchard, Dunaway & Smith

- Back From Hell (2001)
- BDS Live in Paris (2003)

With 5th Avenue Vampires

- Drawing Blood (2010)

With Blue Coupe

- Tornado on the Tracks (2010)
- Million Miles More (2013)
- Eleven Even (2019)

With Hollywood Vampires

- Hollywood Vampires (2015)
