= 2005 in heavy metal music =

This is a timeline documenting the events of heavy metal in the year 2005.

== Newly formed bands ==
- 5 Star Grave
- A Plea for Purging
- Abnormality
- Acrania
- Agrimonia
- AM Conspiracy
- Anew Revolution
- Antagonist A.D.
- Arise and Ruin
- Arsonists Get All the Girls
- As Hell Retreats
- Attila
- Ava Inferi
- Battle Beast
- Benedictum
- Beyond Creation
- Beyond Fear
- Birds of Prey
- Black Tusk
- Bleed from Within
- Bloodred Hourglass
- Blotted Science
- Bonded by Blood
- Borealis
- Brain Drill
- The Browning
- The Burial
- Carnifex
- Century
- Child Bite
- Dark the Suns
- Dawn of Solace
- Death Breath
- The Devil Wears Prada
- Divine Heresy
- Five Finger Death Punch
- The Foreshadowing
- Ghost Brigade
- Hatchet
- Ihsahn
- Impending Doom
- In This Moment
- Ithilien
- Kauan
- Keldian
- Lazarus A.D.
- Lifelover
- Light Bringer
- Motionless in White
- Periphery
- Powerglove
- Red Fang
- Silent Civilian
- Stream of Passion
- Svartsot
- Swashbuckle
- Ten Tonne Dozer
- Thou
- Varg
- Vildhjarta
- We Came as Romans
- We Were Gentlemen
- Wednesday 13
- Wodensthrone

== Reformed bands ==
- Alice in Chains
- Anthrax
- Devourment
- Emperor
- Nothingface
- Terrorizer

== Disbanded bands ==
- Child's Play
- Conducting from the Grave
- Exhumed (indefinite hiatus)
- Gorguts
- Sentenced
- Symphony in Peril
- The 3rd and the Mortal

== Events ==
- Winter Solstice releases the music video for "Following Caligula" premiered through Yahoo! Music on May 25, 2005.
- Despised Icon releases the music video for "The Sunset Will Never Charm Us" premiered through Yahoo! Music on October 17, 2005.
- Korn guitarist Brian "Head" Welch leaves the band.
- Soilwork guitarist Peter Wichers leaves the band in late December after playing in the band for ten years to concentrate on record producing.
- Static-X lead guitarist Tripp Eisen was arrested in February for "lewd conduct against children", and was fired from the band.
- Vocalist Tarja Turunen was fired from Nightwish.
- Jason Jones departure from Drowning Pool was publicly announced on June 14, 2005, due to irreconcilable differences. On August 25 at the Ozzfest date in Dallas, Texas, Drowning Pool did a guest shot performance on the main stage debuting their new singer Ryan McCombs.
- Visions of Atlantis lead vocalist Nicole Bogner quits and is replaced by ex-Aesma Daeva vocalist, Melissa Ferlaak. Guitarist Werner Fielder quits and is replaced by Wolfgang Koch.
- Kittie bassist Jennifer Arroyo quits and is replaced by Trish Doan. Session guitarist Lisa Marx quits and is replaced by Tara McLeod.
- Hellhammer becomes Dimmu Borgir's new drummer.
- American Head Charge guitarist Bryan Ottoson dies at 27.
- Motörhead picked up their first Grammy in the awards of 2005 in the Best Metal Performance category for their cover of Metallica's "Whiplash" on Metallic Attack: The Ultimate Tribute.
- Sentenced members announce their break-up and the release of their last album The Funeral Album. On October 1, they play and record their final show Buried Alive (released on 2006) on their hometown Oulu, Finland.
- Dave Mustaine, frontman of Megadeth puts together music festival Gigantour for the first time.

== Deaths ==
- May 10 – David Wayne, former vocalist of Metal Church, died from health complications following injuries sustained in a car accident at the age of 47.
- May 22 – Mike "Yaz" Jastremski, former bassist of Heathen, died from a heart attack at the age of 42.
- August 18 – Krzysztof "Docent" Raczkowski, formed drummer of Vader, died from heart failure at the age of 34.
- August 26 – Denis "Piggy" D'Amour, founder and guitarist of Voivod, died from colon cancer complications at the age of 45.
- Mika Ervaskari, original Stratovarius keyboardist, died by suicide.

== Albums released ==
=== January ===
Day	Artist	Album
10	Kreator	Enemy of God
17	Grave Digger	The Last Supper
18	Fozzy	All That Remains
24	Draconian	Arcane Rain Fell
24	Sturmgeist	Meister Mephisto
25	Dark Tranquillity	Character
28	Chimp Spanner	Imperium Vorago
31	Masterplan	Aeronautics
31	Runemagick	Envenom

=== February ===
Day	Artist	Album
1	High on Fire	Blessed Black Wings
1	Korpiklaani	Voice of Wilderness
1	Mötley Crüe	Red, White & Crüe (Compilation)
1	Tristania	Ashes
1	WarCry	¿Dónde Está La Luz?
5	Immolation	Harnessing Ruin
7	Primordial	The Gathering Wilderness
7	Scar Symmetry	Symmetric in Design
8	Crowbar	Lifesblood for the Downtrodden
15	American Head Charge	The Feeding
17	Lordi	The Monster Show
21	Communic	Conspiracy in Mind
28	Trail of Tears	Free Fall Into Fear

=== March ===
Day	Artist	Album
1	Judas Priest	Angel of Retribution
1	Nokturnal Mortum	Weltanschauung
4	HammerFall	Chapter V: Unbent, Unbowed, Unbroken
8	Black Label Society	Mafia
8	Impaled	Death After Life
8	Into the Moat	The Design
8	Novembers Doom	The Pale Haunt Departure
8	Soilwork	Stabbing the Drama
8	Winter Solstice	The Fall of Rome
9	Dir En Grey	Withering to Death
11	Heidevolk	De strijdlust is geboren
15	Cephalic Carnage	Anomalies
15	Kamelot	The Black Halo
15	Origin	Echoes of Decimation
15	Trivium	Ascendancy
16	Mournful Congregation	The Monad of Creation
17	Paradise Lost	Paradise Lost
22	Kylesa	To Walk a Middle Course
22	Overkill	ReliXIV
22	Queens of the Stone Age	Lullabies to Paralyze
22	Strapping Young Lad	Alien
23	Galneryus	Advance to the Fall
29	Mourning Beloveth	A Murderous Circus
29	Reggie and the Full Effect	Songs Not to Get Married To
29	Theory of a Deadman	Gasoline

=== April ===
Day	Artist	Album
5	Despised Icon	The Healing Process
5	Graveworm	(N)utopia
12	Cog	The New Normal
12	Mudvayne	Lost and Found
17	Aborted	The Archaic Abattoir
21	Epica	Consign to Oblivion
25	Metalium	Demons of Insanity – Chapter Five
25	Napalm Death	The Code Is Red...Long Live the Code
26	Opiate for the Masses	The Spore

=== May ===
Day	Artist	Album
2	Limp Bizkit	The Unquestionable Truth (Part 1) (EP)
3	Candlemass	Candlemass
3	Jacobs Dream	Drama of the Ages
3	Nine Inch Nails	With Teeth
16	Meshuggah	Catch Thirtythree
16	Wrench in the Works	Prodigal Transmission
17	Def Leppard	Rock of Ages: The Definitive Collection
17	The Red Chord	Clients
17	System of a Down	Mezmerize
20	Crashdïet	Rest in Sleaze
21	Freedom Call	The Circle of Life
23	Bruce Dickinson	Tyranny of Souls
23	Queenadreena	The Butcher and the Butterfly
24	The Agony Scene	The Darkest Red
24	Nile	Annihilation of the Wicked
24	Seether	Karma and Effect
31	Sentenced	The Funeral Album

=== June ===
Day	Artist	Album
7	Avenged Sevenfold	City of Evil
7	Dream Theater	Octavarium
10	Stick to Your Guns	For What It's Worth
14	As I Lay Dying	Shadows Are Security
14	Life of Agony	Broken Valley
14	Static-X	Start a War
18	The Legion of Hetheria	Choices…
19	Winds of Plague	A Cold Day in Hell
21	Clutch	Robot Hive/Exodus
28	DevilDriver	The Fury of Our Maker's Hand
28	Haste the Day	When Everything Falls
28	Hate Eternal	I, Monarch
28	Throwdown	Vendetta

=== July ===
Day	Artist	Album
4	Alice Cooper	Dirty Diamonds
12	The Black Dahlia Murder	Miasma
12	Obituary	Frozen in Time
26	Arch Enemy	Doomsday Machine
26	Chiodos	All's Well That Ends Well
26	Dope	American Apathy
26	Nevermore	This Godless Endeavor
26	Yngwie Malmsteen	Unleash the Fury

=== August ===
Day	Artist	Album
9	Chimaira	Chimaira
16	Stryper	Reborn
22	Destruction	Inventor of Evil
22	Fear Factory	Transgression
22	Xandria	India
23	The Bled	Found in the Flood
23	Every Time I Die	Gutter Phenomenon
24	Sonata Arctica	The End of This Chapter (Compilation)
24	Swallow the Sun	Ghosts of Loss
29	Opeth	Ghost Reveries
30	Becoming the Archetype	Terminate Damnation
30	From Autumn to Ashes	Abandon Your Friends
30	Gorefest	La Muerte
30	Protest the Hero	Kezia

=== September ===
Day	Artist	Album
5	Beseech	Sunless Days
5	Hypocrisy	Virus
5	Stratovarius	Stratovarius
6	Between the Buried and Me	Alaska
6	Ion Dissonance	Solace
8	After Forever	Remagine
12	Hortus Animae	The Blow of Furious Winds
12	Parkway Drive	Killing with a Smile
14	Children of Bodom	Are You Dead Yet?
20	Bon Jovi	Have a Nice Day
20	Coheed and Cambria	Good Apollo, I'm Burning Star IV, Volume One: From Fear Through the Eyes of Madness
20	Disturbed	Ten Thousand Fists
20	God Forbid	IV: Constitution of Treason
20	Zero Hour	A Fragile Mind
24	Arkona	Vo slavu velikim!
27	Gojira	From Mars to Sirius

=== October ===
Day	Artist	Album
3	Bullet for My Valentine	The Poison (UK Release)
4	Black Label Society	Kings of Damnation 98–04
4	Deftones	B-Sides & Rarities
4	Exodus	Shovel Headed Kill Machine
4	Shinedown	Us and Them
4	Soulfly	Dark Ages
10	Massacration	Gates of Metal Fried Chicken of Death
11	Early Man	Closing In
11	Gamma Ray	Majestic
11	Roadrunner United	The All-Star Sessions
11	Sevendust	Next
11	Story of the Year	In the Wake of Determination
15	Primal Fear	Seven Seals
17	Sunn O)))	Black One
18	Cryptopsy	Once Was Not
18	Fireball Ministry	Their Rock Is Not Our Rock
18	Priestess	Hello Master
18	Scars of Tomorrow	The Horror of Realization
18	Solefald	An Icelandic Odyssey
24	Stream of Passion	Embrace the Storm
25	Demon Hunter	The Triptych
25	Through the Eyes of the Dead	Bloodlust
28	Rammstein	Rosenrot
31	Helloween	Keeper of the Seven Keys: The Legacy
31	Riverside	Second Life Syndrome

=== November ===
Day	Artist	Album
1	Deep Purple	Rapture of the Deep
7	Power Quest	Magic Never Dies
8	August Burns Red	Thrill Seeker
8	Elfonía	This Sonic Landscape
11	Bolt Thrower	Those Once Loyal
11	Devourment	Butcher the Weak
11	Dimmu Borgir	Stormblåst MMV
19	Darkspace	Dark Space II
22	Buckethead	Kaleidoscalp
22	System of a Down	Hypnotize
28	Sacrificium	Escaping the Stupor
28	Sólstafir	Masterpiece of Bitterness
29	The Darkness	One Way Ticket to Hell... and Back

=== December ===
Day	Artist	Album
6	Job for a Cowboy	Doom
6	Korn	See You on the Other Side
16	Faith	Sorg
20	Whispering Gallery	Shades of Sorrow

== See also ==
- 2005 in Swiss music

Preceded by 2004	Heavy Metal Timeline; 2005	Succeeded by 2006
