= Road (Alice Cooper album) =

Studio album by Alice Cooper
- Released: August 25, 2023
- Studio: 2022
- Genre: Hard rock, heavy metal
- Length: 47:43
- Label: earMusic
- Producer: Bob Ezrin

Alice Cooper chronology
Detroit Stories (2021)	Road (2023)	The Revenge of Alice Cooper (2025)

Singles from Road
- 1. "I'm Alice" Released: June 14, 2023; 2. "White Line Frankenstein" Released: July 19, 2023; 3. "Welcome to the Show" Released: August 8, 2023; 4. "Dead Don't Dance" Released: October 30, 2023

Road is the twenty-second solo and overall twenty-ninth studio album by American rock musician Alice Cooper, released through Earmusic on August 25, 2023. It was recorded live in the studio by Cooper and his touring band—guitarists Nita Strauss, Ryan Roxie and Tommy Henriksen, bassist Chuck Garric and drummer Glen Sobel. The album was announced on June 14, 2023, alongside the release of the lead single "I'm Alice" which was followed by the album's second single, "White Line Frankenstein" (featuring Tom Morello), on July 19, 2023, and the album's third single, "Welcome to the Show" on August 8, 2023. Cooper promoted the album with a tour of US stadium shows supporting Mötley Crüe and Def Leppard in August, followed by a co-headlining tour with Rob Zombie into September.

== Background and recording ==
For the album, Cooper wanted to showcase his live band and for them to be "involved in the foundation of all the songs". He insisted on no overdubs as the "whole idea of this album is showing off how good this band is live". Prior to announcing Road, Cooper spoke of it being a "concept album" about "things that happen on the road. There's a lot of humor in it. There's a couple of heartbreakers, but it's very guitar-driven because that's what I look for in an album."

== Critical reception ==
Professional ratings
Aggregate scores
Source	Rating
Metacritic	76/100
Review scores
Source	Rating
AllMusic	3.5/5 stars
American Songwriter	4/5 stars
Classic Rock	4/5 stars
Mojo	4/5 stars
Uncut	7/10

Road received a score of 76 out of 100 on review aggregator Metacritic based on seven critics' reviews, indicating "generally favorable" reception. Uncut remarked that it is "all great fun and played by a road-hardened band full of vigour", while Mojo described it as "a hugely enjoyable hoot". Classic Rock called it a "cohesively themed album lathered in multi-tiered guitars, anthemic choruses and high-density power riffage, tempered by road-honed dynamism and built for the stage". Hal Horowitz of American Songwriter felt that "while Road is no five-star masterpiece like the recently reissued and expanded Killer or School's Out collections", it is "perhaps unexpectedly, worthy of being mentioned in the same breath as his best". AllMusic's Fred Thomas summarized it as "primarily killer and only a little bit of filler, with Alice tapping into the power he harnessed in his younger days to create a surprisingly inspired collection of new material".

== Track listing ==
Road track listing
No.	Title	Writer(s)	Length
1.	"I'm Alice"	Alice Cooper; Anders Fästander; Bob Ezrin; Kee Marcello; Ryan Roxie	3:55
2.	"Welcome to the Show"	Cooper; Ezrin; Chuck Garric; Glen Sobel; Nita Strauss; Roxie; Tommy Henriksen	3:36
3.	"All Over the World"	Cooper; Ezrin; Garric; Sobel; Strauss; Roxie; Henriksen	3:52
4.	"Dead Don't Dance" (featuring Kane Roberts)	Cooper; Ezrin; Evan Magness; Kane Roberts	3:30
5.	"Go Away"	Cooper; Ezrin; Keith Nelson	4:20
6.	"White Line Frankenstein" (featuring Tom Morello)	Cooper; Ezrin; Morello	3:40
7.	"Big Boots"	Cooper; Ezrin; Garric; Sobel; Strauss; Roxie; Henriksen	3:14
8.	"Rules of the Road"	Cooper; Ezrin; Wayne Kramer	3:48
9.	"The Big Goodbye"	Cooper; Ezrin; Garric; Sobel; Strauss; Roxie; Henriksen	3:32
10.	"Road Rats Forever"	Cooper; Dick Wagner	4:04
11.	"Baby Please Don't Go"	Cooper; Ezrin; Nelson	3:29
12.	"100 More Miles"	Cooper; Ezrin; Garric; Jim Bacchi	3:04
13.	"Magic Bus"	Pete Townshend	3:39
Total length:			47:43

== Personnel ==
- Alice Cooper – lead vocals (all tracks), backing vocals (tracks 5–10, 11, 13)
- Ryan Roxie – guitars (all tracks), acoustic guitar (tracks 11, 13), backing vocals (track 13)
- Nita Strauss – guitars (all tracks), acoustic guitar (track 11), backing vocals (track 13)
- Tommy Henriksen – guitars (all tracks), acoustic guitar (tracks 11, 13), keyboards (tracks 1–3, 5, 6, 8, 11, 12), piano (track 7), additional bass (tracks 7, 11), percussion (tracks 1–3, 5–13), backing vocals (tracks 1–3, 6–13), "Party Animal" (track 8)
- Chuck Garric – bass (all tracks except track 11), backing vocals (track 13)
- Glen Sobel – drums (all tracks)
- Bob Ezrin – backing vocals (tracks 1–8, 10, 11), acoustic guitar (track 11), horn synth (track 12)
- Kane Roberts – guitar (track 4)
- Tom Morello – guitar (track 6), backing vocals (track 6)
- Burleigh Johnson – piano (track 10)
- Keith Miller – acoustic guitar (track 11)
- Roger Glover – bass (track 11)
- Sheryl Cooper – backing vocals (track 8)

== Charts ==
Chart performance for Road
Chart (2023)	Peak position
Australian Albums (ARIA)	19
Austrian Albums (Ö3 Austria)	3
Czech Albums (ČNS IFPI)	78
Dutch Albums (Album Top 100)	49
Finnish Albums (Suomen virallinen lista)	17
French Albums (SNEP)	16
German Albums (Offizielle Top 100)	2
Hungarian Physical Albums (MAHASZ)	34
Norwegian Albums (VG-lista)	39
Polish Albums (ZPAV)	51
Scottish Albums (OCC)	2
Spanish Albums (PROMUSICAE)	43
Swedish Albums (Sverigetopplistan)	24
Swiss Albums (Schweizer Hitparade)	6
UK Albums (OCC)	8
UK Independent Albums (OCC)	2
UK Rock & Metal Albums (OCC)	1
US Billboard 200	160
US Independent Albums (Billboard)	25
US Top Hard Rock Albums (Billboard)	7
US Top Rock Albums (Billboard)	25
