= The Eyes of Alice Cooper =

Studio album by Alice Cooper
- Released: September 23, 2003
- Recorded: 2003
- Genre: Hard rock; garage rock; glam rock; punk rock
- Length: 44:11
- Label: Spitfire
- Producer: Alice Cooper, Mudrock

Alice Cooper chronology
Hell Is (2002)	The Eyes of Alice Cooper (2003)	School's Out and Other Hits (2004)

Professional ratings
Review scores
Source	Rating
Allmusic	3/5 stars
Rolling Stone	2/5 stars

The Eyes of Alice Cooper, released in 2003, is the sixteenth solo and twenty-third studio album overall by American rock musician Alice Cooper. With this album, Cooper returned to his earlier hard rock sound, in the vein of The Last Temptation, and left the heavy industrial metal sound found in his last two studio albums. Of note is the album cover, which was released in four different versions, featuring alternate colours in Cooper's eyes and the crescent around the 'A' in the title. It was available in blue, green, purple and red.

In the 2010 Behind the Music Remastered on Alice Cooper, "Between High School & Old School" was described as "a modern Alice Cooper classic" for its return to the topic of school (a reference to "School's Out").

== Track listing ==
All tracks are written by Alice Cooper, Eric Dover and Ryan Roxie, except where noted.

No.	Title	Writer(s)	Length
1.	"What Do You Want from Me?"	Cooper, Dover, Mikal Reid	3:24
2.	"Between High School & Old School"		3:01
3.	"Man of the Year"		2:51
4.	"Novocaine"		3:07
5.	"Bye Bye, Baby"		3:27
6.	"Be with You Awhile"	Cooper, Dover	4:17
7.	"Detroit City"	Cooper, Roxie, Chuck Garric	3:58
8.	"Spirits Rebellious"		3:35
9.	"This House Is Haunted"		3:30
10.	"Love Should Never Feel Like This"		3:32
11.	"The Song That Didn't Rhyme"		3:17
12.	"I'm So Angry"		3:36
13.	"Backyard Brawl"		2:36

== Personnel ==
- Alice Cooper - vocals
- Eric Dover - guitar
- Ryan Roxie - guitar, backing vocals, co-lead vocals on "What Do You Want from Me?"
- Chuck Garric - bass
- Eric Singer - drums
- Wayne Kramer - additional guitar on "Detroit City"
- Calico Cooper - voice and theremin

== Trivia ==
Ted Nugent, Iggy Pop, The MC5, Eminem, Kid Rock, Insane Clown Posse, Bob Seger and The Silver Bullet Band and David Bowie (as Ziggy Stardust), Creem Magazine and WRIF radio are all mentioned in the song "Detroit City". Also, 1967 Detroit riot is referenced in the second verse.

For the Breadcrumbs EP & the following Detroit Stories album, Alice Cooper re-recorded the song as Detroit City 2021, with updated lyrics including a new reference to Suzi Quatro.

== Charts ==
Chart (2003)	Peak position
Austrian Albums (Ö3 Austria)	72
Finnish Albums (Suomen virallinen lista)	40
German Albums (Offizielle Top 100)	78
Scottish Albums (OCC)	99
Swedish Albums (Sverigetopplistan)	59
UK Independent Albums (OCC)	7
US Billboard 200	184
US Independent Albums (Billboard)	10
