= Theatre of War =

Theatre of War or Theater of War may refer to:

- Theater (warfare), a military term for an area where an armed conflict takes place
- Theatre War, a war between Denmark-Norway and Sweden in 1788-1789
- Theater of War (album), a 2001 music album by the band Jacob's Dream
- Theater of War (film), a 2008 documentary film by director John Walter
- Theatre of War (2018 film), an Argentine documentary film
- Theatre of War, a 1994 Doctor Who novel by Justin Richards
- Theatre of War (Three-Sixty), a 1992 computer game by Three-Sixty Pacific
- Theatre of War (video game), a 2007 computer game by 1C Company
- War of the Theatres, a rivalry between playwrights Ben Johnson, John Marston, and Thomas Dekker from 1599 to 1602
- Theater of War Productions, a social impact theater company that produces readings of plays to address public health and social issues
