= Detroit Stories =

Studio album by Alice Cooper
- Released: February 26, 2021
- Recorded: 2019–2020
- Studios: Anarchy Studios, Nashville, Tennessee, US; Loud Mouse Studios, Toronto, Canada; Nassau, Bahamas & Zurich, Switzerland; Rust Belt Studios, Royal Oak, Michigan, US; Solid Rock Studios, Phoenix, US; The Saltmine Studios, Mesa, Arizona, US; Twangmeister Studios, North East Lincolnshire, England
- Genres: Hard rock; blues rock
- Length: 50:28
- Label: earMusic
- Producer: Bob Ezrin

Alice Cooper chronology
Live from the Astroturf (2018)	Detroit Stories (2021)	Road (2023)

Singles from Detroit Stories
- 1. "Don't Give Up" Released: May 15, 2020; 2. "Rock & Roll" Released: November 13, 2020; 3. "Our Love Will Change the World" Released: December 11, 2020; 4. "Social Debris" Released: February 4, 2021

Detroit Stories is the twenty-first solo and twenty-eighth overall studio album by American rock musician Alice Cooper. The album was released on February 26, 2021, by Earmusic. It crowned Billboard's Top Album Sales chart (dated March 3, 2021) debuting at No. 1 and was the first chart-topper for Cooper in the 29-year history of the Top Album Sales chart. The album was produced by Bob Ezrin, who also added various instruments. As a solo album, it incorporates a variety of artists contributing on a number of instruments.

The album features themes consistent with the rest of Alice Cooper's discography, with the grandeur and exaggerated shock-rock narratives that he has exhibited in previous work. However, the album also features a significant aspect of nostalgia, as Detroit Stories notes many influences from traditional hard-rock origins in Detroit, and attempts to return to the age of hard-rock that Cooper originated in.

Detroit Stories sold 13,000 copies in its first week of sales (ending March 4) across CD, of which 9,500 were sold, vinyl LP, which generated 2,000 sales, and digital download formats making up the remaining 1,500 sales. Additionally, it topped the Tastemaker Albums chart, which assesses releases based on their sales at independent and small chain music shops, from which 38% of the albums first-week sales originated from.

On the all-genre Billboard 200, Detroit Stories topped at number 47, number 2 on Hard Rock Albums, number 5 on Top Rock Albums, number 7 on Independent Albums and number 18 on Vinyl Albums.

== Release ==
On November 11, 2020, Alice Cooper announced the release of his twenty-first studio album.

=== Singles ===
"Rock & Roll", a cover of the Velvet Underground song, was released as the first single on November 13, 2020, and is essentially a remake of the 1971 version by Detroit with Mitch Ryder, some of producer Bob Ezrin's first work.

On December 11, 2020, Alice Cooper released the second single, "Our Love Will Change the World". The single is a cover of American power pop band Outrageous Cherry's 2005 song of the same name.

The third single, "Social Debris", was released on Alice's 73rd birthday on February 4, 2021. It was available as a free download for a limited time.

"Hanging On by a Thread (Don't Give Up)" had previously been released as a single by Alice on May 15, 2020, simply titled "Don't Give Up", to help fans through COVID-19. The lyrics were subsequently altered for the album to raise awareness on mental health.

== Context ==
Detroit Stories is written about Alice Cooper's origins in music, and the history of hard rock in Detroit, Michigan (Hughes, 2021). As stated by Cooper, he attempted to incorporate something that "tasted like Detroit" into every aspect of the album. Released in a time when hard rock no longer topped the popular music charts, Cooper wrote an album attempting return to the roots of rock and roll and make a "real rock and roll album".

Thus, Cooper incorporates many musical aspects resonant of the musical era from which he came, and other musicians of the era who inspired him and grew in popularity with him from Detroit.

In accordance with this, there are many Detroit and wider Michigan rock influences throughout the album's track list. For example, Cooper covers Michigan band Outrageous Cherry's song "Our Love will Change the World," infusing it with his own, more aggressive style. The song "Go Man Go" includes a guitar part written by Detroit hard rock band MC5's guitarist Wayne Kramer. In his cover of The Velvet Underground's "Rock 'n' Roll," Cooper changes lyrics that originally reminisced on New York to that of Detroit, and in "Despite all the Amputations," Cooper takes an opportunity to lend credit to a plethora of famous Detroit rockers who inspired him and came from the same hard rock scene, such as Iggy Pop, Ted Nugent and Suzi Quattro. The album furthermore features a number of contributions and credits from many Detroit/Michigan musicians such as Wayne Kramer from MC5 and Mark Farner from the influential Flint, Grand Funk Railroad, a Michigan group, as well as the surviving members of the Alice Cooper group and blues musician Joe Bonamassa.

== Hard rock origins in Detroit, Michigan ==
Cooper was born and raised in Detroit; however, his family moved to Arizona when he was ten years old. He formed his first band in Phoenix, later moving to Los Angeles in an attempt at musical success, however, they were not able to find success until they returned to Detroit. The band's hard rock, infused with psychedelic influences in their early work did not do well in Los Angeles, but rather found itself more at home in Detroit.

The Alice Cooper band had begun to garner a reputation, seen in the rumours that spread through the country of Vincent Furnier (Alice Cooper front man, who adopted the Alice Cooper name as his own during the band period; he kept the Alice moniker for his solo work) ripping the head off of a chicken and drinking its blood on stage. This reputation managed to find a home in Detroit, Cooper stating that "Detroit understood us" as they began to frequent more shows in Detroit by 1969, before permanently moving there several months later in 1970.

Cooper's specific brand of 'shock rock' was birthed in Detroit with their theatrical and strange performances. Cooper would appear in front of audiences with a boa constrictor around him, the band would frequently perform cross-dressed and could perform a mock execution on Cooper during the show. The Alice Cooper bands hard-rock and reaction-provoking performances grew out of Detroit, as they would perform alongside other famous Detroit rockers such as MC5 and The Stooges. As stated by Cooper, Detroit Stories is a record that attempts to take audiences back to this time in Detroit, as he believes it to be the "home of hard rock".

Cooper's history in music is rooted in themes of sex and violence, with an electronic influence born in Detroit, as opposed to the blues influences that dominated the time period. It is these themes that he is reminiscing upon on his album Detroit Stories. Identifying with the youth and rebellion of the time, Cooper's music thrived in the environment of Detroit. The cult status that his band gathered in this time remains an important part of his musical success and writing to this day.

While the cult status and heavily 'Detroit' sound defined Alice Cooper's music, his appeal managed to surpass similar Detroit bands of the time, such as the MC5 and The Stooges and reach much higher success. This influence has had a large influence on much of the more flashy, glam and 'glitter' rock that emerged following Alice Cooper in the seventies.

It was following the bands move to Phoenix that Cooper branched out into solo work, with his first solo album coming out in 1975. The same aesthetic and energy that defined The Alice Cooper band continued in much the same spirit in Coopers later solo work. Cooper continued to deliver similar live performances in the spirit of his Detroit performances through the eighties, and his music continued in much the same vein. Detroit Stories can be seen as a celebration of this brand of hard rock, as Cooper reminisces on his time in Detroit, and his origins in music.

== Critical reception ==
Professional ratings
Aggregate scores
Source	Rating
Metacritic	71/100
Review scores
Source	Rating
AllMusic	2.5/5 stars
American Songwriter	3.5/5 stars
Metal Hammer	3.5/5 stars
Rolling Stone	3.5/5 stars

At Metacritic, which assigns a weighted average rating out of 100 to reviews from mainstream publications, this release received an average score of 72 based on 10 reviews, and a 7.3 out of 10 in their 'user score' category. These reviews were taken from Under the Radar, Classic Rock Magazine, musicOMH.com, The Independent (UK) and Mojo, (all scoring an 80 out of 100). Additionally, from Punknews.org, Rolling Stone and American Songwriter (all scoring a 70 out of 100). Finally, from Uncut (scoring a 60 out of 100) and AllMusic (scoring a 50 out of 100).

Gareth Williams from Wall of Sound scored the album a perfect 10/10, stating that "diehard fans of Alice Cooper will embrace this album for what it is, back to his roots mix of blues, jazz, soul, hard rock, humor and heart. Casual fans may be surprised at the rocker's versatility, but Alice has never been one dimensional." Writing for AllMusic, Fred Thomas said "Detroit Stories is stuck in a confusing limbo somewhere between tribute to Detroit and another album of the kind of campy, theatrical, radio-geared hard rock Cooper has been turning in since Hey Stoopid. Never quite committing to either concept, Detroit Stories ends up feeling like a handful of solid covers of classic Detroit tunes with some Alice Cooper extras thrown in at random."

Kory Grow of Rolling Stone described the "enduring appeal" of Alice Cooper's music, stating that when he "hits his stride," the record is a funny and entertaining listening experience, in which the spirit of Alice Cooper's earlier music shines through. However, Grow does criticize Cooper for falling flat in some of the record's humor, and not being able to smoothly integrate attempts at serious songs.

Gus Ironside of Louder Than War scored the album a four out of five. Ironside spoke very positively of Cooper's record, describing it as a "boisterous celebration" of the seventies and sixties metal and hard rock from which Alice Cooper and his band The Alice Cooper Band emerged from. Similar to Grow, Ironside sees the album as an immense amount of fun to listen to, describing the "joi de vivre" of the album as "impossible to resist." Ironside additionally contextualizes the album, claiming it to be one of the greatest things to come out of the twenty-twenty to twenty-twenty one COVID-19 pandemic.

The critical appraisal of Detroit Stories is centered around a nostalgia for the earlier days of Alice Cooper's music and admires the elements of his music that originated in and became popular in Detroit and Cooper's earlier solo work. Aspects such as the shocking and heavy content and presence of his music, as well as the tongue-in-cheek and often dark sense of humor are the focus of most positive receptions of Detroit Stories.

On the other hand, negative responses to Detroit Stories are defined by a frustration or tiring from the style of Alice Cooper's music that originated in his early work in Detroit.

== Inspiration ==
Inspiration for Detroit Stories largely came from Furnier's memories and experiences in the hard-rock scenes of 1970s and 1980s Detroit. He draws heavily on the aesthetic of the 'motor city' that he grew up in and became renowned in, attempting to return to the hard rock 'roots' that he found there. Stylistically the album is very gritty, and follows the same punk, metal and shock-rock inspired sound of the earlier days of the Alice Cooper Group and the Detroit music scene (Grow, 2021). Inspired by the grandeur of his earlier days in rock and roll, Detroit Stories is full of exaggerated narratives and symbols.

Alice Cooper's 21st studio album is also largely inspired by his entire history in music. A deeper dive into the history of his music and music in Detroit is prompted in this album. Detroit Stories is a reflection upon the music of Alice Cooper, not just a certain time period in music. Thus, inspiration for Detroit Stories has also been drawn from Cooper's entire career in music. Further, not only the music of Alice Cooper, but the aesthetic of his music and performances are a large inspiration for this album, as similar themes are seen all throughout the album.

The music in Detroit Stories is a reflection upon Cooper's time in the music industry as well as a celebration of his origins in music, which is seen stylistically throughout the album.

== Track listing ==
Detroit Stories track listing
No.	Title	Writer(s)	Length
1.	"Rock & Roll" (The Velvet Underground cover)	Lou Reed	4:43 5:45 (vinyl)
2.	"Go Man Go"	Alice Cooper, Bob Ezrin, Tommy Henriksen, Wayne Kramer	2:40
3.	"Our Love Will Change the World" (Outrageous Cherry cover)	Matthew Smith	3:39
4.	"Social Debris"	Cooper, Ezrin, Neal Smith	3:05
5.	"$1000 High Heel Shoes"	Cooper, Ezrin, Kramer	3:29
6.	"Hail Mary"	Cooper, Ezrin, Henriksen	3:15
7.	"Detroit City 2021"	Cooper, Ezrin, Henriksen, Ryan Roxie, Chuck Garric	3:20
8.	"Drunk and in Love"	Cooper, Ezrin, Dennis Dunaway	3:52
9.	"Independence Dave"	Cooper, Ezrin, Kramer	2:57
10.	"I Hate You"	Cooper, Ezrin, Dunaway	2:34
11.	"Wonderful World"	Cooper, Ezrin, Henriksen, Tommy Denander	3:20
12.	"Sister Anne" (MC5 cover)	Fred "Sonic" Smith	4:47
13.	"Hanging On by a Thread (Don't Give Up)"	Cooper, Ezrin, Henriksen	3:36
14.	"Shut Up and Rock"	Cooper, Ezrin, Henriksen, Denander	2:09
15.	"East Side Story" (Bob Seger & The Last Heard cover)	Bob Seger	2:52
Total length:			50:28

== Personnel ==
- Alice Cooper – vocals (all tracks), backing vocals (tracks 1, 7), harp (tracks 8, 12)
- Michael Bruce – guitar (tracks 4, 10), vocals (track 10)
- Dennis Dunaway – bass (tracks 4, 10), guitar (track 10), vocals (track 10)
- Neal Smith – drums (tracks 4, 10), vocals (track 10)
- Bob Ezrin – organ (track 1), cowbell (track 1), percussion (tracks 2, 6), piano (tracks 3, 15), backing vocals (tracks 1–3, 6, 7, 11, 13, 15), programming (track 13), keyboards (track 13)
- Johnny "Bee" Bedanjek – drums (tracks 1–3, 5–9, 11–13, 15), backing vocals (track 1)
- Garret Bielaniec – guitar (tracks 1–3, 5–9, 11–15)
- Tommy Henriksen – guitar (tracks 2–4, 6, 7, 9, 11, 13–15), percussion (tracks 3, 4, 11, 15), backing vocals (tracks 2–4, 6, 7, 9, 11, 13–15), programming (tracks 10, 13)
- Wayne Kramer – guitar (tracks 2, 3, 5–7, 9, 11–13, 15), backing vocals (tracks 1, 12)
- Paul Randolph – bass (tracks 1–3, 5–9, 11–13, 15), backing vocals (tracks 1, 12)
- Joe Bonamassa – guitar (tracks 1, 8)
- Mark Farner – guitar (tracks 2, 6, 7, 12), backing vocals (tracks 12)
- Steve Hunter – guitar (track 1), lead guitar (track 13)
- Tommy Denander – guitar (tracks 11, 14), keyboards (tracks 11, 13)
- Steven Crayn – lead guitar (track 4)
- Matthew Smith – guitar (track 13)
- Rick Tedesco – guitar (tracks 4, 10)
- Jimmy Lee Sloas – bass (track 14)
- Larry Mullen Jr – drums (track 14)
- Calico Cooper – backing vocals (tracks 1, 3, 15)
- Sheryl Cooper – backing vocals (tracks 1, 3, 15)
- James Shelton – organ (tracks 1, 5)
- Carla Camarillo – backing vocals (tracks 5, 9)
- Camille Sledge – backing vocals (track 5)
- Debra Sledge – backing vocals (track 5)
- Tanya Thillet – backing vocals (track 5)
- Keith Kaminski – saxophone (track 5)
- John Rutherford – trombone (track 5)
- Walter White – trumpet (track 5)

== Charts ==
Chart performance for Detroit Stories
Chart (2021)	Peak position
Australian Albums (ARIA)	3
Austrian Albums (Ö3 Austria)	3
Belgian Albums (Ultratop Flanders)	17
Belgian Albums (Ultratop Wallonia)	7
Canadian Albums (Billboard)	56
Czech Albums (ČNS IFPI)	27
Dutch Albums (Album Top 100)	51
Finnish Albums (Suomen virallinen lista)	6
German Albums (Offizielle Top 100)	1
Hungarian Albums (MAHASZ)	23
Italian Albums (FIMI)	39
Norwegian Albums (VG-lista)	22
Polish Albums (ZPAV)	39
Spanish Albums (Promusicae)	21
Swedish Albums (Sverigetopplistan)	7
Swiss Albums (Schweizer Hitparade)	3
UK Albums (Official Charts)	4
UK Rock & Metal Albums (Official Charts)	2
US Billboard 200	47
US Top Hard Rock Albums (Billboard)	2
US Top Rock Albums (Billboard)	5
