= Jacobs Dream (album) =

Studio album by Jacobs Dream
- Released: 2000
- Genre: Power metal, christian metal
- Length: 47:53
- Label: Metal Blade Records
- Producer: Rick May

Jacobs Dream chronology
Jacobs Dream Demo (1997)	Jacobs Dream (2000)	Theater of War (2001)

Jacobs Dream is the self-titled debut by the Ohio-based Christian power metal band Jacobs Dream. The album was released on Metal Blade Records in the year 2000.

== Track listing ==
1. "Kinescope" - 3:34
2. "Funambulism" - 4:34
3. "Scape Goat" - 5:07
4. "Mad House of Cain" - 3:01
5. "Tale of Fears" - 4:30
6. "Crusade" - 4:10
7. "Black Watch" (instrumental) - 3:56
8. "Love & Sorrow" - 4:15
9. "The Gathering" - 3:25
10. "Never Surrender" - 4:13
11. "The Bleeding Tree" - 3:49
12. "Violent Truth" (bonus track) - 3:19

== Credits ==
- James Evans - Bass
- John Berry - Guitar, Synth
- Gary Holtzman - Guitar
- David Taylor - Vocals
- Rick May - Drums
