= Pawnshop Guitars =

Studio album by Gilby Clarke
- Released: July 26, 1994
- Genre: Rock
- Length: 43:40
- Label: Virgin
- Producer: Waddy Wachtel

Gilby Clarke chronology
Pawnshop Guitars (1994)	Blooze EP (1995)

Professional ratings
Review scores
Source	Rating
AllMusic	4/5 stars
Q	3/5 stars

Pawnshop Guitars is the debut solo album by former Guns N' Roses guitarist Gilby Clarke, released in 1994 via Virgin Records. The album was produced by session guitarist Waddy Wachtel, and along with most of the then-current or former members of Guns N' Roses, it features contributions from Pixies vocalist Frank Black, guitarist Ryan Roxie and then-Skid Row drummer Rob Affuso among others.

== Track listing ==
All songs by Gilby Clarke, unless otherwise stated.

1. "Cure Me... Or Kill Me..." (feat. Slash) – 4:56
2. "Black" (feat. Matt Sorum & Dizzy Reed)– 4:21
3. "Tijuana Jail" (feat. Slash & Matt Sorum) – 5:08
4. "Skin & Bones" – 3:17
5. "Johanna's Chopper" – 4:08
6. "Let's Get Lost" (feat. Dizzy Reed) (Clarke/Daniel) – 3:31
7. "Pawn Shop Guitars" (feat. Matt Sorum) – 3:51
8. "Dead Flowers" (feat. Axl Rose) (Mick Jagger, Keith Richards) – 4:13
9. "Jail Guitar Doors" (feat. Duff McKagan & Frank Black) (Joe Strummer, Mick Jones) – 3:10
10. "Hunting Dogs" – 3:15
11. "Shut Up" (feat. Dizzy Reed) – 3:58
12. "West Of The Sunset" – 3:17 (Japanese Edition Bonus Track)

== Personnel ==
- Gilby Clarke – vocals, guitars, piano, sitar

Additional musicians

- Axl Rose – vocals, background vocals on "Dead Flowers", piano
- Slash – lead guitar on "Cure Me... Or Kill Me..." and "Tijuana Jail"
- Duff McKagan – bass and drums on "Jail Guitar Doors"
- Matt Sorum – drums on "Black", "Tijuana Jail", and "Pawn Shop Guitars"
- Dizzy Reed – mellotron, Hammond organ, calliope
- Jo Almeida – guitar
- Frank Black – guitars, background vocals on "Jail Guitar Doors"
- Ryan Roxie – guitars
- Waddy Wachtel – guitars, producer
- Teddy Andreadis – Hammond organ
- Will Effertz – bass
- Jonathan Daniel – bass
- Rob Affuso – drums, percussion
- Marc Danzeisen – drums, percussion, background vocals
- Eric Skodis – drums, background vocals, jaw harp
- John Schubert – drums
- Roberta Freeman – background vocals
- Joel Derouin – fiddle
- Dean Clark – cowbell
