= Get Damned =

Studio album by The Agony Scene
- Released: October 23, 2007
- Genre: Metalcore
- Length: 36:38
- Label: Century Media
- Producer: Andreas Magnusson and The Agony Scene

The Agony Scene chronology
The Darkest Red (2005)	Get Damned (2007)	Tormentor (2018)

Singles from The Agony Scene
- 1. "Barnburner"

Alternative cover
- Uncensored cover with the above slip-cover removed.

Get Damned is the third studio album by American metalcore band The Agony Scene, released on October 23, 2007 by Century Media Records. The original release contained only 11 tracks. The cover art that is most commonly displayed is not the true "cover", to say; it is merely a cardboard slip-cover. The small, inverted coffin (superimposed with a ↓/downward-facing arrow) is a cut-out window in the outer sleeve, which exposes a portion of the art beneath it. Once removed, the true cover is revealed: a skull (minus the jaw bone), which is impaled with skewers throughout. The coffin and arrow we see through the slip-cover window is etched into the middle of the skull's forehead. There is no text on this "skull" version of the cover. The inverted coffin/arrow seems to be a symbolic representation of the album, as it is re-printed in a multitude of places, including the front cover, back cover, liner notes, and on the CD pressing, itself.

In early 2008, a special edition of the album was released to a European-only audience containing two additional tracks that are cover songs, and which are unavailable from the U.S. version of the iTunes Store.

The song "Barnburner" is featured in the 2008 video game Saints Row 2.

== Track listing ==
1. "Barnburner" – 3:05
2. "Predation" – 3:27
3. "Dances with Devils" – 3:02
4. "Adversary" – 3:28
5. "White Nights" – 4:15
6. "Rapture" – 3:21
7. "Deliverance" – 2:46
8. "Rattle Me Bones" – 2:29
9. "The Opposition" – 3:03
10. "Will to Bleed" – 3:08
11. "Old Scratch" – 4:29
12. * "Do What You Want" – 1:08 (Bad Religion cover, *only available on Special Edition release)
13. * "Kill the Poor" – 3:02 (Dead Kennedys cover, *only available on Special Edition release)

== Personnel ==
The Agony Scene

- Mike Williams – vocals
- Chris Emmons – lead guitar
- Brian Hodges – rhythm guitar, bass

Guest/Session

- Matt Horwitz – drums

== Reception ==
Get Damned
Review scores
Source	Rating
About.com	3.5/5 stars

Get Damned was received with fairly weak reviews compared to previous efforts. In contrast to their self-titled The Agony Scene release and their 2005 effort, The Darkest Red, Get Damned took on a much more "punk" feel, particularly in the drumming style. As a result, their sound seemed to fit more easily into the punk metal genre than their established metalcore foundation. This attribute was likely a result of the replacement of existing drummer Brent Masters (who wrote and recorded drum tracks from The Agony Scene's first two studio albums) with newcomer Ryan Folden in 2006. With a new member bringing his unique style into the mix, the structure and overall "feel" of Get Damned was quite different upon first listening. The resulting polarization of opinions in reviews of the album was quite obvious.

== Legacy ==
This album would prove to be the last from The Agony Scene for nearly ten years. Shortly after its release, they unexpectedly pulled out of their European supporting tour with Himsa, citing "major personal situations". The band quietly broke up in Spring of 2008, without much publicity other than a statement from the band's frontman Mike Williams. The band returned and released a new album in 2018.
