= Ryan Roxie =

American musician (born 1965)

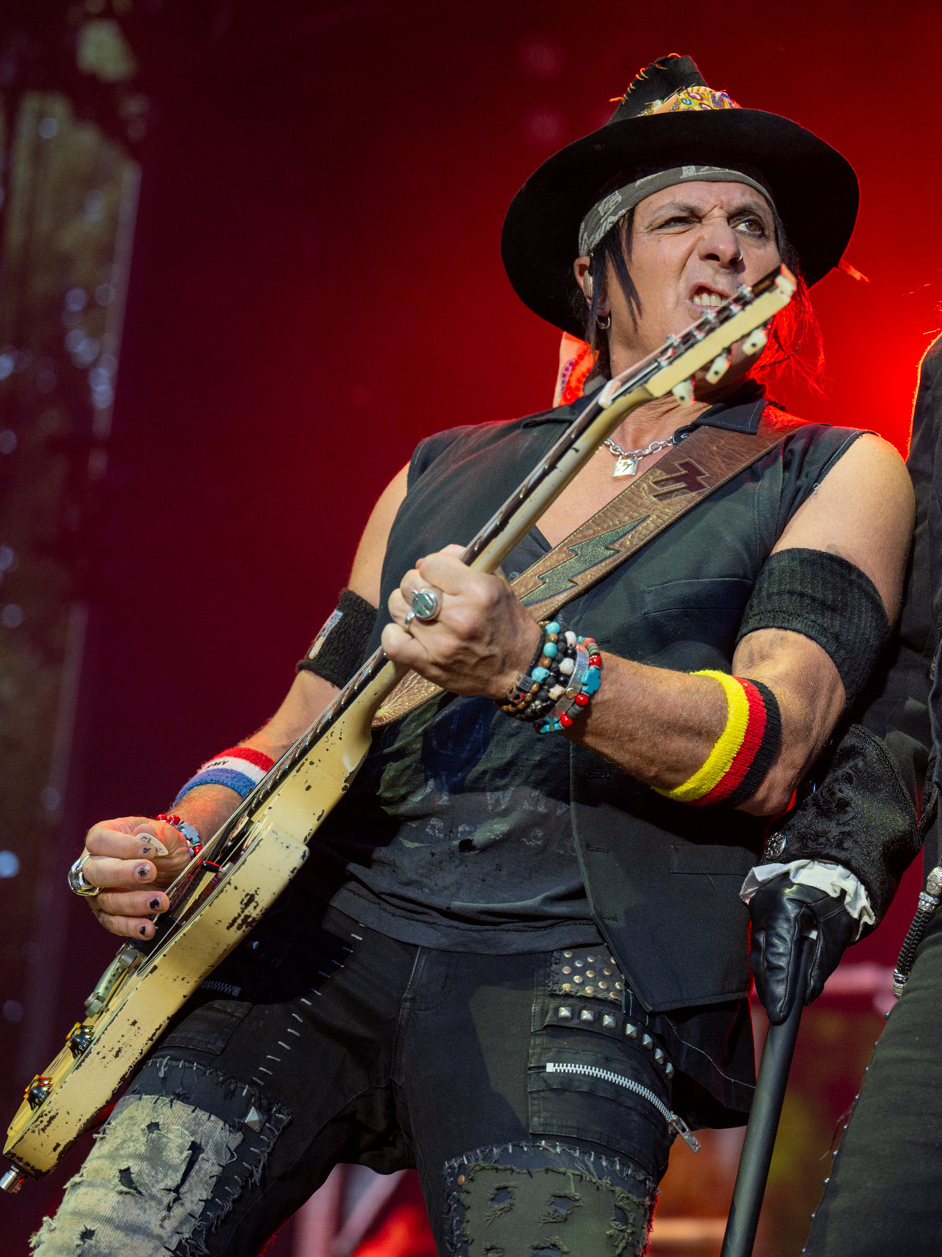
- Roxie performing with Alice Cooper in 2024

Background information
- Born: Ryan Rosowicz; December 1, 1965 (age 60); Sacramento, California
- Genres: Hard rock, glam metal
- Occupations: Musician, songwriter
- Instruments: Guitar, vocals
- Years active: 1977–present
- Label: Wax-Tone
- Website: ryanroxie.com

Ryan Roxie (born Ryan Rosowicz, December 1, 1965) is an American guitarist, singer and songwriter best known as a solo artist and for playing guitar with Alice Cooper, Casablanca, Gilby Clarke, and Slash's Snakepit. Roxie is the primary founder of the System-12 Guitar Method and also hosts the weekly In the Trenches with Ryan Roxie podcast.

== Early years ==
Roxie was born in Sacramento, California and grew up in the East Bay in Pleasanton. Roxie's father, Polish, was a trumpet player and his mother was a drummer in her high school marching band. When he was about the age of five Roxie picked up the guitar but was more interested in drums. It wasn't until he was around eleven or twelve that he started taking guitar seriously.

Roxie learned to play guitar from an old record player and invented his own form of scratching, going through many records in the process, picking out guitar parts. He was influenced by albums like Van Halen and has had many guitar heroes including Brian May from Queen, Steve Stevens, Elliot Easton from The Cars as well as Neil Geraldo from Pat Benatar and Rick Nielsen of Cheap Trick.

== Career ==
=== 1977–1990: Candy & Electric Angels ===
Candy were a band featuring original members Kyle Vincent, Jonathan Daniel, John Schubert, and guitarist Geoff Siegel. Gilby Clarke replaced Siegel after six months. The album Whatever Happened To Fun was released in 1985. Later in the same year, Gilby Clarke replaced Kyle Vincent as lead vocalist, and Roxie joined the lineup on guitar. After Gilby left to form his own band "Kill for Thrills" the remaining band members joined up with new lead vocalist Shane and became the "Electric Angels".

The band then moved to New York where they were signed to Atlantic Records at a show opening for Dogs D'amour and Mother Love Bone (some of whose members went on to form Pearl Jam). Their self-titled album, produced by Tony Visconti (best known for his work with T Rex, Bowie and Thin Lizzy to name a few) was released in 1990 and the band toured with Danger Danger, Ace Frehley, and Icon. The band began work on a second album (tentatively called New York Times) but was dropped by Atlantic and the record was not released until 2017, then under the name "Lost in the Atlantic", a dig at Atlantic Records.

=== 1991–2000: Alice Cooper, Gilby Clarke, Slash & DPM ===
Between 1994 and 1996 Roxie worked with various artists. He provided guitar on Gilby Clarke's albums, Pawnshop Guitars, Blooze, The Hangover and Rubber. Though uncredited Roxie also played guitar for Tal Bachman. Roxie played on the hit single "She's So High" produced by Bob Rock. Roxie played guitar on Inhale by James Michael (from Sixx AM). In 2000 Roxie also wrote and recorded several songs on Slash's Snakepit's second album Ain't Life Grand.

Roxie began working with Alice Cooper in 1996; after a recommendation from Gilby Clarke, and a shady character known as 'Bobby from Mates', Roxie impressed during an audition. He was offered a 'one year tour' playing with Cooper. His first show with the Cooper band was at Sammy Hagar's Cabo Wabo club in Cabo San Lucas.

In 1997 Roxie joined up with long-time friends drummer Mike Fasano and bassist Will Effertz to create the band Dad's Porno Mag. After Effertz left, guitarist Keri Kelli and bassist Stefan Adika joined. Their album, produced by Jim Mitchell (Ugly Kid Joe) and Mark Schulman (Simple Minds), with additional production by Alex Woltman and friend Gilby Clarke, was released on Wax-Tone Records; the album went out of print but was later re-released in 2000 from Robinson Records.

In 1999, Roxie formed GlamNation under the alias Peter Kensington; the band was a glam-rock cover band that played covers of early glam bands such as The Sweet, David Bowie, Queen, T.Rex and Gary Glitter. The band played a number of shows in L.A. in 1999 and had a regular spot at The Gig (Club American Style) and a show in Scandinavia in 2000. The band at various times consisted of the following musicians playing under their GlamNation Aliases, Ryan Roxie ("Peter Kensington), guitars; Eric Singer ("Doyle Harris"), drums and vocals; Eric Dover ("J.C. Jackson"), vocals and guitars; Stefan Adika ("Yashiya"), bass; Derek Sherinian ("Ricky Lemons"), keyboards. In 2000 Teddy Andreadis ("Dr. Midnight") replaced Derek Sherinian on keyboards. In 2000 Roxie recorded his first studio album with Alice Cooper, Brutal Planet, and except for Stefan Adika the other members of GlamNation played in the band Alice Cooper used on the Brutal Planet Tour. Later without Teddy Andreadis, Roxie and GlamNation went on to co-write and record the 2003 Alice Cooper release The Eyes of Alice Cooper.

=== 2000–2009: Alice Cooper, Roxie77 & Happypill ===
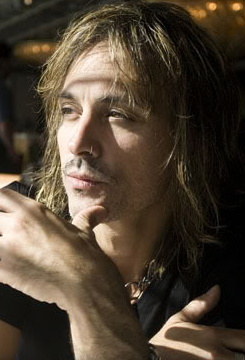
Ryan Roxie, c. 2000s

Through 2000 to 2005 Roxie collaborated with Cooper on several albums including Dragontown, The Eyes of Alice Cooper and Dirty Diamonds, co-writing a number of songs on the latter two albums.

In 2002 Roxie formed Roxie 77 and wrote a song whose influences lie somewhere in between the Beatles and the Beastie Boys. Roxie 77's 11-song debut album, Peace, Love & Armageddon, was released under the small indie Wax-Tone Records label in 2004. The songs span from talking about acting like a punk kid to facing the reality of actually having a child. Roxie 77's second album Two Sides to Every Story, was released in July 2009. The band added a downloadable song every week, with 24 songs in all (each song in a full band and acoustic version).

On July 7, 2005, Roxie aired the first Roxie 77 podcast – Roxie's Big Rock Show. There were seven podcasts which featured interviews with long-time friend Stefan Adika, as well as Calico Cooper, Damon Johnson, Eric Singer, Alice Cooper. Cheap Trick's Rick Nielsen and Bun E. Carlos were also interviewed. The podcast also played Roxie's favourite songs, some rare tracks and two unreleased Roxie tracks including "Consequence Of The City" with ex-Alice Cooper band member and friend Eric Dover on vocals.

In October 2006 Roxie hosted his own radio show on Rocket 95.3 FM (The Rock Home of Stockholm) The show ran weekly and featured a variety of music. The website featured live streaming, an online chat and webcam of Roxie in the studio during broadcasts.

=== 2010–2021: Solo career, Alice Cooper, Casablanca & TED ===
From 2010 through to 2014, Roxie recorded two albums with the Stockholm-based, Casablanca: Apocalyptic Youth and Riding a Black Swan.

In March 2012 it was announced that Ryan Roxie was rejoining the Alice Cooper band for the forthcoming 2012 tour, joining Tommy Henriksen and Orianthi on guitar, Chuck Garric on bass and Glen Sobel on drums.

In 2014, Roxie 77 released a six-song EP, The Ameriswede. The record was rather a unique release, with one "American side", mixed by Tommy Henriksen, and one "Swedish side", mixed by Jon Bordon with a more garage-indie sound.

Late in 2017, while on the road with Alice Cooper, Roxie released a new solo single, a cover of The Move's "California Man" featuring guest vocals from Robin Zander of Cheap Trick (who had covered the same song on their Heaven Tonight record).

Roxie continued touring with Alice Cooper though 2018, and also released two new solo singles the first "Over & Done" in March followed by "To Live and Die in L.A." in May.

Roxie's first official solo album "Imagine Your Reality" was released May 25, 2018, and followed by a U.S. Tour billed as the "Planet Axe Tour". Five singles were released from the record, and the band toured the U.K. in 2019.

Roxie participated in TEDxStockholm Wonderland in 2019; Ryan was praised for his entertaining segment (particularly as it was on short notice with very little preparation). He played a number of songs and spoke in between; he went on to state that his success was based on the ‘’three P’s practice": Practice, Persistence and Patience, work towards a goal and it will happen. Ironically after seeing his first TEDTalk some years before, it had become a goal of Ryan's to one day deliver a TEDTalk himself...

December 2018 Ryan Roxie is announced as a Headline act for "The Cancer on the Rocks Macmillan Benefit Fundraiser 2019" to be held on the 23 and 24 February in Cheshire.

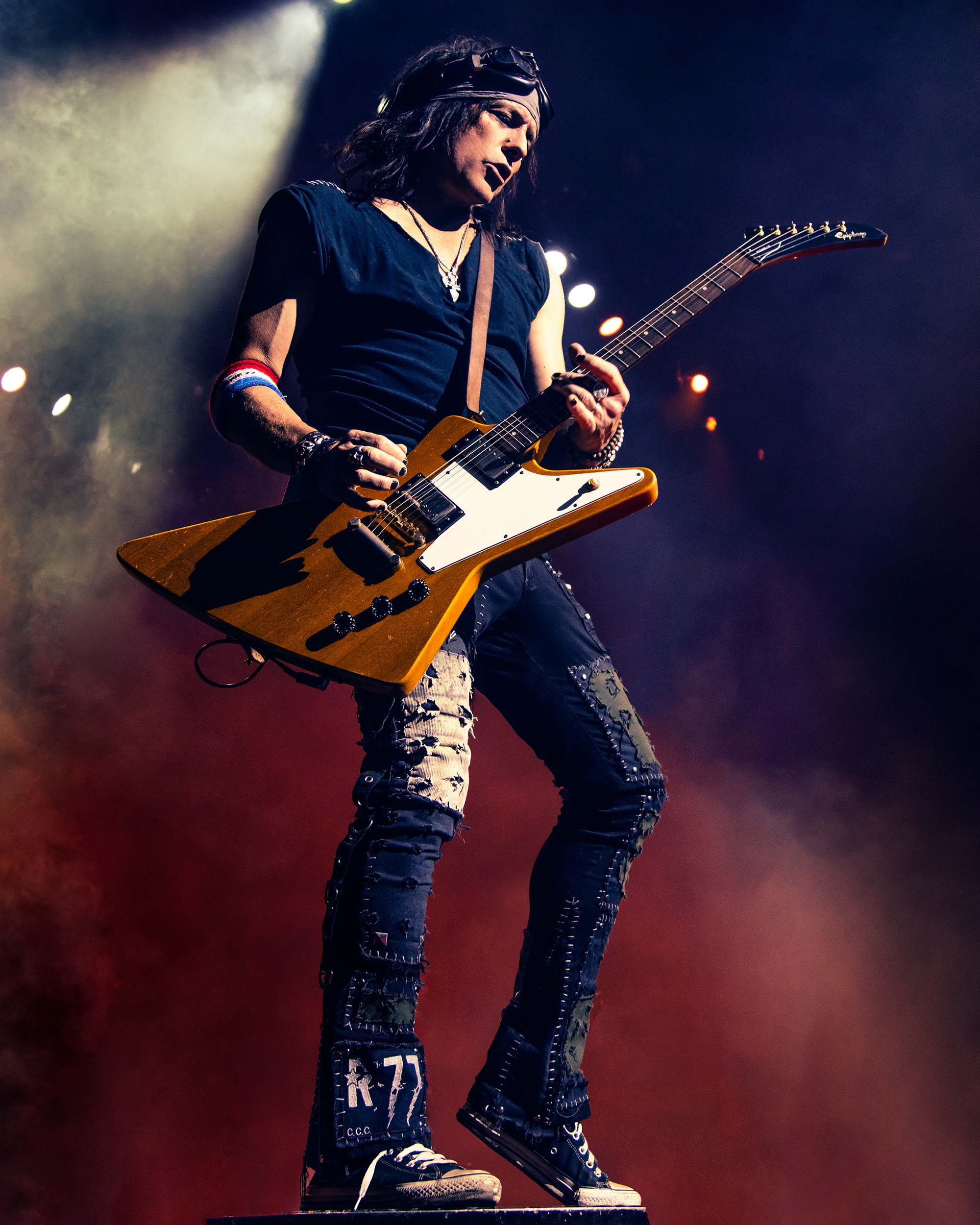
Roxie with Alice Cooper in 2018

December 2018 Ryan Roxie releases the 6th single "Big Rock Show" from "Imagine your Reality" the song guests his bandmates from the current Alice Cooper band Glen Sobel on drums and Tommy Henriksen on bass. The lyric video was filmed on an iPhone XR designed for viewing in portrait mode on smartphones and tablets. On the day of the single release Ryan had the unique idea to stream a LIVE guitar lesson on how to play the song with help from his friends at PlayAlong Music. The idea was a success with viewers able to ask Ryan questions live via Facebook or Instagram through the duration of the stream.

December 31, 2018 Ryan Roxie reforms with GlamNation to perform at Rava Wines in Paso Robles, California with the original GlamNation (2000) line up and special guests Brent Woods, Sebastian Bach, FIFI LaRUE, Jesse Adika, Kenny Lee Lewis, and Brett Scallions.

January 2019 Ryan Roxie announces first solo show of 2019 for February 2 Thessaloniki, Greece.

January 2019 New Official Ryan Roxie Website released

January 2019 following the popularity of the Big Rock Show single release live guitar lesson, Ryan continues to take requests from fans of songs they would like to learn and every few weeks broadcasts a new lesson including Ryan's track "Me Generation", Alice Coopers "Brutal Planet" and Cheap Tricks "Surrender".

February 2019 Ryan Roxie is announced as a guest on the 2019 Bandit Rock Awards and performs songs from Imagine Your Reality.

February 2019 Ryan Roxie announces an April 2019 U.S. Planet Axe Tour with Brandon Gibbs, Joel Kosche, Robby Miller, and Kenny Bailey in addition to a busy schedule with Alice Cooper on the "Old Black Eyes is Back" 2019 Tour

March 2019 Ryan Roxie to appear at the Crow Club in Athens Greece with Alice Cooper tribute band Snakebite, the show is billed as "Ryan Roxie of the Alice Cooper Band meets Snakebite the Alice Cooper Tribute Band"

April 2019 Ryan Roxie tours the U.S. with Brandon Gibbs, Joel Kosche, Robby Miller, Kenny Bailey, and Jacob Cade for the Planet Axe 2.0 Tour

April 12, 2019 Ryan Roxie releases his 7th single "Look Me In The Eye" from "Imagine your Reality". The video is directed by Gustav Kronfelt & filmed by Anton Körberg and, in true Roxie style, includes hidden messages throughout the video which Ryan uses to run competitions on social media.

April 23, 2019 Ryan Roxie (known for his huge presence on social media) posts his 1000th Facebook post

May 2019 Ryan Roxie to again join Alice Cooper on the "Old Black Eyes" Tour through the U.S and Europe beginning on May 4 at the Domination Festival, Mexico and finishing at the Motorpoint Arena Cardiff in the UK on October 12.

May 18, 2019 Ryan Roxie returns to Rava Wines in Paso Robles CA for a special performance with "The Sunset Winos", the all-star band also featured Eric Dover, Stefan Adika, Teddy Andreadis, Johnny Griparic, Jimmy DeGrasso, Slim Jim Phantom, and Paul Black.

June 8, 2019 Ryan Roxie plays with Blue Coupe at the Sweden Rock Festival. Blue Coupe features Dennis Dunaway (bass player and founding member of the original Alice Cooper Group), as well as Joe Bouchard and Albert Bouchard original founders of Blue Öyster Cult.

July 7, 2019 (7/7 Roxie day) Ryan Roxie releases a special edition of Ryan Roxie's Imagine Your Reality through Bellyache Records, known as the ‘Alternate Reality - Purple Skull’ Special Edition LP. The record is pressed on ‘Translucent Purple’ vinyl in honour of Purple Skull Music, the studio in Stockholm Sweden where the bulk of the album was recorded. To mark its exclusivity each copy is hand-numbered and only 85 copies were pressed.

July 16, 2019 Ryan Roxie debuts "In the Trenches with Ryan Roxie" a new podcast series promoted as a show that features in depth conversations with the world's hardest working musicians...the ones that grind, the ones that commit, the ones who make their dreams come true...in the trenches. Some of the featured interviewed artists include Phil X, Steve Stevens, Joe Satriani and Desmond Child.

July 2019 Ryan Roxie joins the Alice Cooper band for the "Alice Cooper-O’l Black Eyes Is Back Tour " in early July and "Alice Cooper/Halestorm Motionless in White Summer Tour 2019 " (a double headline tour which runs through from mid-July to mid-August) before returning to the Alice Cooper-O’l Black Eyes Is Back Tour which will visit UK, North America, Australia, New Zealand and Europe’

August 20, 2019 Ryan Roxie appears on the Pink Carpet At the ‘Live from the Astroturf w/ Alice Cooper" premiere event in NYC.

September 2019 Ryan Roxie announces he will be joining supergroup Lost Angels for the "Good to the Last Drop UK Tour" for a series of shows beginning on the 17th October in Grimsby with Troy Patrick Farrell, EJ Curse and his old Alice Cooper/Glamnation bandmate Eric Dover.

October 16, 2019 Ryan Roxie Releases the first of three lyric videos for ‘Nevermind Me' from the Ryan Roxie solo album 'Imagine Your Reality'. In true Roxie style access to versions two and three of the ‘Nevermind Me' video you must follow the hidden clues within the preceding video to work out the links... November 28, 2019, Ryan Roxie is a guest on Couch Riffs with Mike Squires. The concept of the show being Mike gives the artist a list of songs to choose from, builds the drum track to record on it...however, you only get one opportunity to record the entire song from start to finish. The chosen song was Cheap Tricks 'He's a Whore' which was just about perfect...

December 26, 2019, Ryan Roxie begins... The 12 Days of 'Pickmas' and continues to release a new pick each day on social media for the following twelve days allowing fans to get a glimpse of the upcoming 2020 guitar pick range with varying themes.

January 13, 2020, leading into the upcoming 2020 Australian Tour it is announced Ryan Roxie will join Alice Cooper at a fundraising concert at the ANZ Stadium in Sydney, Australia, billed as Fire Fight Australia on the Sunday 16 February 2020 playing alongside multiple international and local acts including other headliners Queen + Adam Lambert, Olivia Newton-John and k.d. lang to raise funds for the 2019–20 Australian Bushfire Crisis. The concert sold out in about 5 hours selling in excess of 65,000 tickets.

March 2020, Roxie released a special “live stream edition” of "In the Trenches with Ryan Roxie" Episode #7009 Podcast featuring Alice Cooper bandmate and Hollywood Vampire Tommy Henriksen. The live stream version is well received and is used occasionally from this point on allowing fans to interact with Ryan and his guests.

On March 24, 2020, Roxie debuted "Sunday Livestream Sunday" a live stream show where Roxie performed some songs acoustically, general chit chat and news. Most importantly, he used the platform to launch his new online guitar lesson platform the System-12 Guitar Method.

On March 24, 2020, Roxie launched his new System-12 Guitar Method, The online guitar lesson platform was received well by both the public and fans alike, Guitar International Online magazine releases an interview with Ryan and promotes the release. Popular website Blabbermouth also take interest and release a story on the project.

On April 14, 2020, Roxie was interviewed by Metaltalk.net and spoke about, lockdown, guitar lesson, Alice Cooper, Slash, Motely Crue and much more. June 14, 2020 sees the release of “Heart's in Trouble” the 9th single from 'Imagine Your Reality'. On October 16, 2020, Roxie appeared in promotional video testing Aloha by Elk product, the platform essentially lets the user connect over internet and play together like they are in the same room in real time.

On November 29, Roxie was a special guest on Talkulture with kid cadet and Danica Jenelle a Live Q&A

On January 1, 2021, Roxie released “The Uh-Oh Song”. the 10th and final video release for the ‘Imagine Your Reality' Album.

== In The Trenches - With Ryan Roxie ==
Debuting on July 16, 2019, "In the Trenches with Ryan Roxie" is a podcast hosted by Roxie. The show features in depth conversations with musicians; the show is billed as featuring "the worlds hardest working musicians...the ones that grind, the ones that commit, the ones who make their dreams come true...in the trenches".

=== Episode list ===
Date	Episode	Guest	Overview
July 16, 2019	#7001	Charlie Starr	Guitarist for Blackberry Smoke
July 2019	#7002	Steve Brown	Guitarist known for his work with Trixter and Def Leppard
July 2019	#7003	Phil X	Guitarist for Bon Jovi and much more
October 11, 2019	#7004	Joel Hoekstra	Guitarist for Whitesnake
November 26, 2019	#7005	Jimmy Webb	Jimmy Webb of I Need More Clothing, N.Y.C.
January 27, 2020	#7006	Michael Staertow	Journeyman guitarist for Slaughter, Lou Gramm
February 23, 2020	#7007	Nita Strauss	Alice Cooper bandmate, guitarist extraordinaire also known for her work with Femme Fatale and The Iron Maidens. (This was the first time Ryan had interviewed a bandmate for "In the Trenches").
March 10, 2020	#7008	Johan Becker	Swedish musician singer and songwriter
March 2020	#7009	Tommy Henriksen	Special Livestream event - Guitarist extraordinaire, Alice Cooper bandmate and Hollywood Vampire. (This was the first special live stream event).
March 20, 2020	#7010	Steve Stevens	Special Livestream event - Guitarist superstar known for his work with Billy Idol, Michael Jackson, Bozzio Levin Stevens, his amazing solo work and much more...
March 25, 2020	#7011	Dennis Dunaway	Original Alice Cooper Group Bassist who is also known for Blue Coupe
April 1, 2020	#????	Brandon Gibbs	Special livestream event- Guitarist and vocalist known for his work with Planet Axe and the Devil City Angels
April 5, 2020	#2012	Jared James Nichols	Guitarist Singer Songwriter
April 8, 2020	#2013	Calico Cooper	Special Livestream event - Actress, Beasto Blanco vocalist and Alice Cooper band performer
April 15, 2020	#7014	Michael Des Barres	Musician, Actor and Radio host
April 17, 2020	#7015	Matt Heafy	Guitarist and vocalist known for his work with Trivium
April 18, 2020	#7016	Andreas Jones and Andy Dick	Ryan Roxie's friends, actors and musicians Andreas Jones and Andy Dick
April 22, 2020	#7017	Kane Roberts	Special livestream event – Guitarist songwriter known for his work with Alice Cooper and as a solo artist
April 24, 2020	#7018	Joel O’Keeffe	Guitarist and vocalist of Australian band Airbourne
April 29, 2020	#7019	Ryan Roxie	Guitarist, Singer, and Podcast Host. Interviewed by Robby Miller....
May 6, 2020	#7020	Michael Monroe	Vocalist, saxophonists, harmonica player and songwriter
May 13, 2020	#7021	Chuck Garric	Vocalist/Bassist/Songwriter of the band Beasto Blanco and The Alice Cooper Band
May 19, 2020	#7022	THE LOST ANGELS REUNION EPISODE	This episode features the reunion of The Lost Angels. A collective musical entity that includes - John Corabi, Eric Dover, Ryan Roxie, EJ Curse, Eric Brittingham, Troy Patrick Farrell and more.
May 24, 2020	#7023	Adam Slack	Guitarist of the Struts
June, 2020	#2024	Guy Griffin	Quireboys Guitarist
June 5, 2020	#2025	Acey Slade	Multi-instrumentalist known for his work with Dope and the Murderdolls.
June 10, 2020	#7026	Michael Monroe	Part II of the in-depth conversation with Vocalist/songwriter Michael Monroe
June 17, 2020	#7027	Gilby Clarke	Guitarist, Singer-Songwriter, Producer, and Cleveland Ohio native
June 20, 2020	#7028	Pete Thorn	Guitarist, Songwriter and music entrepreneur
June 24, 2020	#7029	Joe Hottinger	Guitarist of American Rock Band Halestorm
July 1, 2020	#7030	Davey Johnstone	Guitarist for Elton John
July 8, 2020	#7031	Marty Schwartz	Guitarist
July 15, 2020	#7032	Andreas Kisser	Guitarist of the Brazilian Metal Band Sepultura
July 22, 2020	#7033	Kane Roberts	Part 2 with Guitarist/Vocalist Kane Roberts
July 29, 2020	#7034	Glen Sobel	Drummer of The Alice Cooper Band & Hollywood Vampires
August 5, 2020	#7035	Rick Nielsen	Guitarist, songwriter and legend of Cheap Trick
August 12, 2020	#7036	Kip Winger	Winger front man, former Alice Cooper bassist and more
August 19, 2020	#7037	Todd Kerns	Special livestream episode - Episode is a combined 'Duo-Podcast' with Todd Kerns (Slash featuring Myles Kennedy and the Conspirators, The Age of Electric, Static in Stereo, more).
August, 2020	#7038	Orianthi	Guitarist, singer/ songwriter
August, 2020	#7039	Mike Fasano	Drummer, for Warrant, Dads Porno Mag, Tiger Army and more…
August 2020	#7040	Chip Z'Nuff	member of American Rock Band Enuff Z'Nuff
August, 2020	#7041	Kai Ross-Best	Episode features YouTube sensation Kai Ross-Best with our theme of growing up in a world of 'Sick Things UK'! Also appearing will be very special guests Si Halley (Sick Things UK Founder) & Bill Crowe (Longtime Alice Cooper Snake Wrangler)
August, 2020	#7042	Kyler Clarke	Bassist, Photographer, and Alice Cooper Insider Kyler Clark
August, 2020	#7043	Alex Gonzalez	Drummer for Mana
August, 2020	#7044	Joe Satriani	This 'Secret Sauce' episode features the world's most successful solo guitarist who is also from the band Chickenfoot and more.
August, 2020	#7044	Mike Fasano	Drummer, for Warrant, Dads Porno Mag, Tiger Army and more…
October 14, 2020	#7045	Desmond Child	This 'Secret Sauce' episode features Hall of Famer Desmond Child, one of our generations most successful songwriters whose credits include Livin' on a Prayer (Bon Jovi), I Hate Myself for Loving You (Joan Jett), Livin' La Vida Loca (Ricky Martin), POISON (Alice Cooper) and more!
October, 2020	#7046	Leon Harrison	Lead Singer/Frontman of the Hard-Hitting Aussie Rock Band The Lazys.
October, 2020	#7047	Sheryl Cooper	Dancer/Performer of the Alice Cooper Band
October, 2020	#7048	Joey Sykes	Guitarist/Songwriter/Producer - The Babys, Coward, Meredith Brooks, Honey River and more.
October, 2020	#7049	Roger Fisher	Guitarist and founding member of the band Heart
October, 2020	#7050	Satchel	Guitarist and Enigma of the band Steel Panther
October, 2020	#7051	John Schubert	Drummer and founding member of the bands Candy, Electric Angels, and The Loveless.
October, 2020	#7052	Birthday Special	Special Birthday 'Best of' Episode features some of the most memorable clips taken from this past year's ITT episodes and SLS livestreams...hand-selected and discussed by the members of the R.G.A. and System-12 team!
October, 2020	#7053	Ross the Boss	Co-Founder of the bands Manowar and The Dictators.
October, 2020	#7054	Mike Squires	Creator of Couch Riffs as well as guitarist for the bands Loaded, Harvey Danger and more.
December, 2020	#7055	Michael Monroe	The 'Christmas Special' Episode featuring Michael Monroe (Hanoi Rocks) PART III
January 6, 2021	#7056	Michael Bruce	Guitarist and founding member of the Alice Cooper Band.
January 13, 2021	#7057	Jamie Kilstein	Musician, Writer and Comedian
January 19, 2021	#7058	Paul Blazek	Musician, Drummer/Percussionist
January 27, 2021	#7059	Adam Reader	The Professor of Rock
February 3, 2021	#7060	Share Ross	Vixen, Down 'n' Outz, The Dogs D'Amour
February 9, 2021	#7061	Teddy Zig-Zag Andreadis	Guns N'Roses, Alice Cooper, Carol King, Chuck Berry, The Boxmasters and more
February 16, 2021	#7062	Ricky Byrd (special guest Bassist Dennis Dunaway)	Guitarist, Singer-Songwriter & Producer - Joan Jett & the Blackhearts and proclaimed Rock n' Roll Recovery Troubadour
February 23, 2021	#7063	Jay Jay French	Guitarist Twisted Sister
February 27, 2021	####	Special Event - Alice Cooper Band Meeting	Featured - Alice Cooper, Nurse Sheryl, Bob Ezrin, Tommy Henriksen, Nita Strauss, Ryan Roxie, Chuck Garric and Glen Sobel
March 2, 2021	#7064	Eric Weinstein	Mathematician, economist and managing director of Thiel Capital
March 9, 2021	#7065	Suzi Quatro	Queen of glam rock: Singer-Songwriter, Musician, Actress
March 22, 2021	#7066	Rob Halford	Judas Priest and more
March 23, 2021	#7067	Alex Kane	Guitarist of Life Sex & Death, Enuff Z'Nuff, Starz and many more
March 31, 2021	#7068	South African Special!	Featuring: Joe Satriani, Satchel, Michael Monroe, Gilby Clarke and much, much more!
April 6, 2021	#7069	Dr. Jordan B. Peterson	Clinical psychologist, author, and YouTube personality
April 13, 2021	#7070	Tracii Guns	Guitarist L.A. Gunns
April 20, 2021	#7071	Doug Stanhope – Part 1	Comedian, Author, and American Treasure
April 20, 2021	#7072	Doug Stanhope – Part 2	Comedian, Author, and American Treasure
April 28, 2021	#7073	Doro	Metal Queen

== Discography ==
Year	Artist	Album	Label
2003	Candy	Teenage Neon Jungle	Song Tree Records
1990	Electric Angels	Electric Angels	Atlantic Records
1994	Gilby Clarke	Pawnshop Guitars	Virgin Records
1995	Gilby Clarke	Blooze	Virgin Records
1997	Dad's Porno Mag	Dad's Porno Mag	Wax-Tone Records
1997	Gilby Clarke	The Hangover	Paradigm Records
1997	Alice Cooper	A Fistful of Alice	Guardian Records
1998	Tal Bachman	Tal Bachman	Columbia Records
1998	Gilby Clarke	Rubber	Pavement Records
1999	Dad's Porno Mag	Dad's Porno Mag (Re-Release)	Robinson / Conspiracy Records
2000	Slash's Snakepit	Ain't Life Grand	Koch Records
2000	Alice Cooper	Brutal Planet	Spitfire Records
2000	Alice Cooper	Brutally Live	Eagle Records
2001	Alice Cooper	Dragontown	Spitfire Records
2003	Alice Cooper	The Eyes of Alice Cooper	Spitfire Records
2004	Roxie 77	Peace, Love and Armageddon	Wax-Tone Records
2005	Alice Cooper	Dirty Diamonds	New West / Eagle Records
2005	Alice Cooper	Live at Cabo Wabo '96	Angel Records
2006	Alice Cooper	Live at Montreux	Eagle Records
2008	Happypill	This Year (Single Release)	R77Sound Records
2009	Roxie 77	Two Sides To Every Story	Bandcamp/R77Sound Records
2010	Casablanca	Downtown (Single Release)	
2010	Casablanca	La Voix (Single Release)	
2012	Casablanca	Apocalyptic Youth	Rocket Songs
2013	Ryan Roxie(collaborative with DPM, Roxie 77, and various artists)	The Roxie Box	R77 Records
2014	Casablanca	Riding a Black Swan	Sony/Gain Records
2014	Alice Cooper	Raise the Dead: Live from Wacken	UDR Music
2015	Roxie 77	The Ameriswede EP	Bellyache Records
2016	Alice Cooper	Live From The Astroturf	Good Records
2017	Alice Cooper	Paranormal (bonus live tracks)	earMUSIC
2017	Ryan Roxie	California Man - Featuring Special Guest Robin Zander (single release)	Lenata Records, Cargo Records, Bellyache Records
2018	Ryan Roxie	Over & Done (Single Release)	Lenata Records, Cargo Records, Bellyache Records
2018	Ryan Roxie	To Live and Die in L.A. (Single Release)	Lenata Records, Cargo Records, Bellyache Records
2018	Ryan Roxie	Imagine Your Reality	Lenata Records, Cargo Records, Bellyache Records
2018	Ryan Roxie	Me Generation (Single Release)	Lenata Records, Cargo Records, Bellyache Records
2018	Alice Cooper	A Paranormal Evening At The Olympia, Paris	earMUSIC
2018	Ryan Roxie	God Put A Smile On Your Face (Single Release)	Lenata Records, Cargo Records, Bellyache Records
2018	Ryan Roxie	Big Rock Show (Single Release)	Lenata Records, Cargo Records, Bellyache Records
2019	Ryan Roxie	Look Me In The Eye (Single Release)	Lenata Records, Cargo Records, Bellyache Records
2019	Ryan Roxie	Imagine Your Reality (‘Alternate Reality - Purple Skull’ Special Edition LP)	Lenata Records, Cargo Records, Bellyache Records
2019	Alice Cooper	The Breadcrumbs EP (writing credits - Detroit City 2020)	earMUSIC
2019	Ryan Roxie	Nevermind Me (Single Release)	Lenata Records, Cargo Records, Bellyache Records
2020	Ryan Roxie	Heart's in Trouble (Single Release)	Lenata Records, Cargo Records, Bellyache Records
2021	Ryan Roxie	The Uh-Oh Song (Single Release)	Lenata Records, Cargo Records, Bellyache Records
2021	Alice Cooper	Detroit Stories (writing credits - Detroit City 2021)	earMUSIC
2023	Alice Cooper	Road	earMUSIC

== Filmography ==
Year	Title	Role	Notes
1983	TV20 Dance Party Featuring - Fair Warning	Himself - Guitar	TV performing: Eruption and You Really Got Me
1990	Electric Angels - Rattlesnake Kisses	Himself - Guitar	Video Clip
1994	Gilby Clarke & Slash - Tijuana jail	Himself - Guitar	Video Clip
1994	Gilby Clarke "Johannas Chopper"	Himself - Guitar	Video Clip (not official release)
1994	Gilby Clarke "Cure Me or Kill Me" video	Himself - Guitar	Video Clip
1997	Later show with Tommy Davidson	Himself – Guitar with Gilby Clarke	TV
1997	Karl martindahl (charlie emm) Them	Himself - Guitar	Video Clip
1997	A Fistfull of Alice	Himself - Guitar	TV
1997	The Tonight Show with Jay Leno	Himself - Guitar	TV performing: I'm Eighteen
1999	Late Show With David Letterman	Himself - Guitar	TV performing: No More Mr. Nice Guy
2000	Alice Cooper @TFI Friday Show	Himself - Guitar	TV performing: Blow Me a Kiss
2000	Live@NPA Alice Cooper	Himself - Guitar	TV performing: Blow Me a Kiss
2000	Alice Cooper: Brutally Live	Himself - Guitar	Video / DVD
2003	The Late Late Show with Craig Kilborn	Himself – Guitar	TV performing: Man of The Year
2005	The Late Late Show	Himself – Guitar	TV performing: Sunset Babies, All got Rabies
2006	Alice Cooper: Live at Montreux 2005	Himself – Guitar	Video / DVD
2007	Junkfood Horrorfest	Composer	Movie
2007	Happypill - This year	Himself - Vocals / Guitar	Video Clip
2008	HappyPill live at TV4 Nyhetsmorgon	Himself - Vocals / Guitar	TV (Swedish Morning Show) performing: This Year
2009	ROXIE 77 - This Year	Himself – Vocals / Guitar	Video Clip
2010	DPM (Dad's Porno Mag) - BIG FAT SONG	Himself – Vocals / Guitar	Video Clip
2010	Casablanca - Downtown	Himself - Guitarist	Video Clip
2012	Casablanca - Love and Desperation	Himself - Guitarist	Video Clip
2013	Casablanca - The Giant Dreamless Sleep	Himself - Guitarist	Video Clip
2014	ROXIE 77 - The Solution	Himself – Vocals / Guitar	Video Clip
2014	Alice Cooper Raise the Dead: Live From Wacken	Himself - Guitarist	DVD, Blu-Ray
2015	An Evening with Alice Cooper	Himself – Guitar & Composing Credits	TV movie, Pay Per View
2015	ALICE COOPER Live From Austin 2015 DVD	Himself – Guitar	DVD
2015	ALICE COOPER LIVE Fox and Friends Manhattan	Himself – Guitar	TV
2015	The Gothic Clown Killer of Rock and Roll	Himself	Documentary (not yet released)
2015	Le Comité des Reprises	Himself	TV mini-series
2015	ROXIE 77 - Anna	Himself – Vocals / Guitar	Official 'Song Cartoon' created by Annette DeLorean
2016	ROXIE 77 - IDIOTS AND IDOLS (American Mix)	Himself – Vocals / Guitar	VIDEO - SET TO PSYCHO GIRLFRIENDS
2016	Hired Gun	Himself	Documentary (credit only)
2016	Alice Cooper Jimmy Kimmel Live!	Himself - Guitarist	TV
2016	Hair I go again	Guitarist – Alice Cooper	Movie
2017	Joe Dick	Writer / Composer "Second Chances" & "Slice of Fame"	Movie
2017	Alice Cooper - Rock in Rio 2017 LIVE	Himself - Guitarist	TV special
2018	Live from the Astroturf: Alice Cooper	Himself - Guitarist	Concert (not yet released)
2018	Ryan Roxie - Me Generation	Himself – Vocals / Guitarist	Official Lyric Video
2018	Ryan Roxie - To Live and Die in L.A.	Himself - Vocals / Guitarist	Official Lyric Video
2018	Ryan Roxie - Over & Done	Himself - Vocals / Guitarist	Official Lyric Video
2018	Ryan Roxie – "California Man" with Special Guest Vocals from Robin Zander	Himself - Vocals / Guitarist	Official Lyric Video
2018	Ryan Roxie - God Put a Smile Upon Your Face	Himself - Vocals / Guitarist	Official Lyric Video
2018	TEDxStockholm: Wonderland	Himself - Vocals / Guitarist / Spoken Word	TEDxStockholm: Wonderland - LIVE EVENT
2018	Ryan Roxie - Big Rock Show	Himself - Vocals / Guitarist	Official Lyric Video
2019	Ryan Roxie - Look Me In The Eye	Himself - Vocals / Guitarist	Official Lyric Video
2019	Ryan Roxie - Nevermind Me (Versions 1, 2 & 3)	Himself - Vocals / Guitarist	Official Lyric Video
2020	Ryan Roxie - Heart's in Trouble	Himself - Vocals / Guitarist	Official Lyric Video
2021	Ryan Roxie - The Uh-Oh Song	Himself - Vocals / Guitarist	Official Lyric Video
2021	Alice Cooper - A Paranormal Evening At The Olympia, Paris (2017)	Himself – Guitarist	DVD, Blu-Ray (limited release with special editions of Detroit Stories)
