= Blooze =

EP by Gilby Clarke
- Released: 1995
- Genre: Rock
- Label: Virgin Records

Gilby Clarke chronology
Pawnshop Guitars (1994)	Blooze (1995)	The Hangover (1997)

Blooze is an EP by the former Guns N' Roses guitarist Gilby Clarke, released in 1995. The EP was a limited run for the Japanese market.

== Track listing ==
1. "Tijuana Jail" (Live) – 9:29
2. "Melting My Cold Heart" – 3:37
3. "Life's a Gas" – 2:27
4. "He's a Whore" – 2:44
5. "Skin & Bones" (Plugged) – 3:17

== Personnel ==
- Gilby Clarke - lead guitar, lead vocals
- Marc Danzeisen - drums, backing vocals
- Will Effertz - bass, backing vocals
- Ryan Roxie - guitar
- Eric Scotis, Dean Clark, Kenneth - additional backing vocals
