= School's Out and Other Hits =

Greatest hits album by Alice Cooper
- Released: September 14, 2004
- Genre: Hard rock; shock rock; garage rock
- Length: 32:25
- Label: Rhino

Alice Cooper chronology
| The Eyes of Alice Cooper (2003) | School's Out and Other Hits (2004) | Dirty Diamonds (2005) |

Professional ratings
Review scores
| Source | Rating |
|---|---|
| Allmusic | 3.5/5 stars |

School's Out and Other Hits is a 2004 greatest hits album by American rock musician Alice Cooper. The album focuses on Alice Cooper's hits with his former band of the same name and as a solo artist.

== Track listing ==
1. "School's Out"
2. "Under My Wheels"
3. "Be My Lover"
4. "Elected"
5. "No More Mr. Nice Guy"
6. "Only Women Bleed"
7. "Welcome to My Nightmare"
8. "I Never Cry"
9. "Clones (We're All)"
10. "I'm Eighteen"
