= The Hangover (Gilby Clarke album) =

Studio album by Gilby Clarke
- Released: September 23, 1997
- Genre: Rock
- Length: 36:06
- Label: Paradigm Records
- Producer: C.J. DeVillar, Gilby Clarke

Gilby Clarke chronology
Blooze EP (1995)	The Hangover (1997)	Rubber (1998)

Professional ratings
Review scores
Source	Rating
AllMusic	3/5 stars

The Hangover is the second solo album by the former Guns N' Roses guitarist Gilby Clarke, released in 1997. Clem Burke and Eric Singer played on the album.

== Critical reception ==
The Hartford Courant called the album "pretty dull stuff best suited for Harley dudes." Guitar Player wrote: "A devotee of the New York Dolls and T Rex, Gilby goes straight for the jugular on 'Punk Rock Pollution', a sarcastic swipe at three-chord wannabes."

AllMusic deemed the album "an endearing collection of hard rock indebted to glam, sleazy boogie and blues-rock."

== Track listing ==
All tracks by Clarke unless otherwise stated.

1. "Wasn't Yesterday Great" – 2:45
2. "It's Good Enough for Rock N' Roll" – 3:12
3. "Zip Gun" – 3:17
4. "Higher" – 3:20
5. "Mickey Marmalade" – 3:17
6. "Blue Grass Mosquito" – 3:24
7. "Happiness Is a Warm Gun" (John Lennon, Paul McCartney) – 2:56
8. "Hang on to Yourself" (David Bowie) – 2:29
9. "The Worst" – 3:39
10. "Captain Chaos" – 5:12
11. "Punk Rock Pollution" – 2:29

== Personnel ==
- Gilby Clarke - lead vocals, guitars, bass, mellotron, drums
- Waddy Wachtel - guitars
- Ryan Roxie - guitars
- Teddy Andreadis - piano, Hammond organ, harmonica
- C.J. DeVillar - bass, backing vocals
- Will Effertz - bass, backing vocals
- Phil Soussan - bass
- Clem Burke - drums
- Sandy Chila - drums, percussion
- Mike Fasano - drums
- Eric Singer - drums
- Roberta Freeman - backing vocals
- Ovis - backing vocals, horns
- Kyle Vincent - backing vocals
- Jason Alt - backing vocals
