= Souls Highway =

Studio album by Beseech
- Released: August 13, 2002
- Genre: Gothic Metal
- Length: 51:43
- Label: Napalm Records

Beseech chronology
| Black Emotions (2000) | Souls Highway (2002) | Drama (2003) |

Professional ratings
Review scores
| Source | Rating |
|---|---|
| Allmusic | 4.5/5 stars |

Souls Highway is Beseech's third album, released in 2002 by Napalm Records. The CD features 11 tracks.

== Track listing ==
1. "Illusionate"
2. "Between the Lines"
3. "Souls Highway"
4. "Blinded"
5. "Endless Waters"
6. "Fiction City"
7. "Sunset 28"
8. "A Last Farewell"
9. "A Season in Green"
10. "Beyond the Skies"
11. "Gimme! Gimme! Gimme! (A Man After Midnight)"
