= The Darkest Red =

Studio album by The Agony Scene
- Released: May 24, 2005
- Genre: Metalcore
- Length: 37:24
- Label: Roadrunner
- Producer: Rob Caggiano

The Agony Scene chronology
The Agony Scene (2003)	The Darkest Red (2005)	Get Damned (2007)

Professional ratings
Review scores
Source	Rating
AbsolutePunk	(89%)
The Metal Forge	Positive

The Darkest Red is an album from The Agony Scene that was released under Roadrunner Records in 2005. The song "Prey" was included on the 2005 game Infected, released on the PSP. The video for "Prey" was included as one of three bonus videos on the game.

== Track listing ==
All tracks are written by The Agony Scene, except where noted.

No.	Title	Writer(s)	Length
1.	"Prelude"	Rob Caggiano	1:15
2.	"The Darkest Red"		3:50
3.	"Scars of Your Disease"		3:30
4.	"Screams Turn To Silence"		2:55
5.	"Sacrifice"		2:58
6.	"Prey"		3:48
7.	"Procession"		4:36
8.	"Suffer" (includes hidden track)		4:32
9.	"My Dark Desire"		3:49
10.	"Scapegoat"		2:56
11.	"Forever Abandoned"		3:15

Special Edition bonus track
No.	Title	Length
12.	"Devilock"	1:39

== Personnel ==
The Agony Scene

- Mike Williams – vocals
- Chris Emmons – lead guitar
- Stephen Kaye – rhythm guitar
- Brian Hodges – bass
- Brent Masters – drums

Additional

- Rob Caggiano – production, engineer, mixing, additional guitar
- Paul Orafino – engineer, mixing
- Michael Rich – mixing
- Justin Borucki – photography
- Mike Gitter – A&R
