= Theater of War (album) =

Album by Jacobs Dream

Studio album by Jacobs Dream
- Released: 2001
- Recorded: John Schwab Studios
- Genre: Power metal, christian metal
- Length: 44:59
- Label: Metal Blade Records
- Producer: Jacobs Dream with Joe Viers

Jacobs Dream chronology
Jacobs Dream (2000)	Theater of War (2001)	Drama of the Ages (2001)

Theater of War is the second album by the Ohio-based Christian power metal band Jacobs Dream. It was released in 2001 on Metal Blade Records.

== Track listing ==
1. "Sanctuary" - 4:45
2. "Theater of War" - 4:47
3. "Traces of Grace" - 5:25
4. "Wisdom" - 5:34
5. "The Warning" - 4:22
6. "Sarah Williams" - 7:08
7. "De Machina Est Deo" - 3:42
8. "Black Souls" - 3:50
9. "Critical Mass" - 5:26

== Credits ==
- James Evans - Bass
- John Berry - Guitar, Synth
- Derek Eddleblute - Guitar
- David Taylor - Vocals
- Billy Queen - Drums
