= The Agony Scene =

American metal band

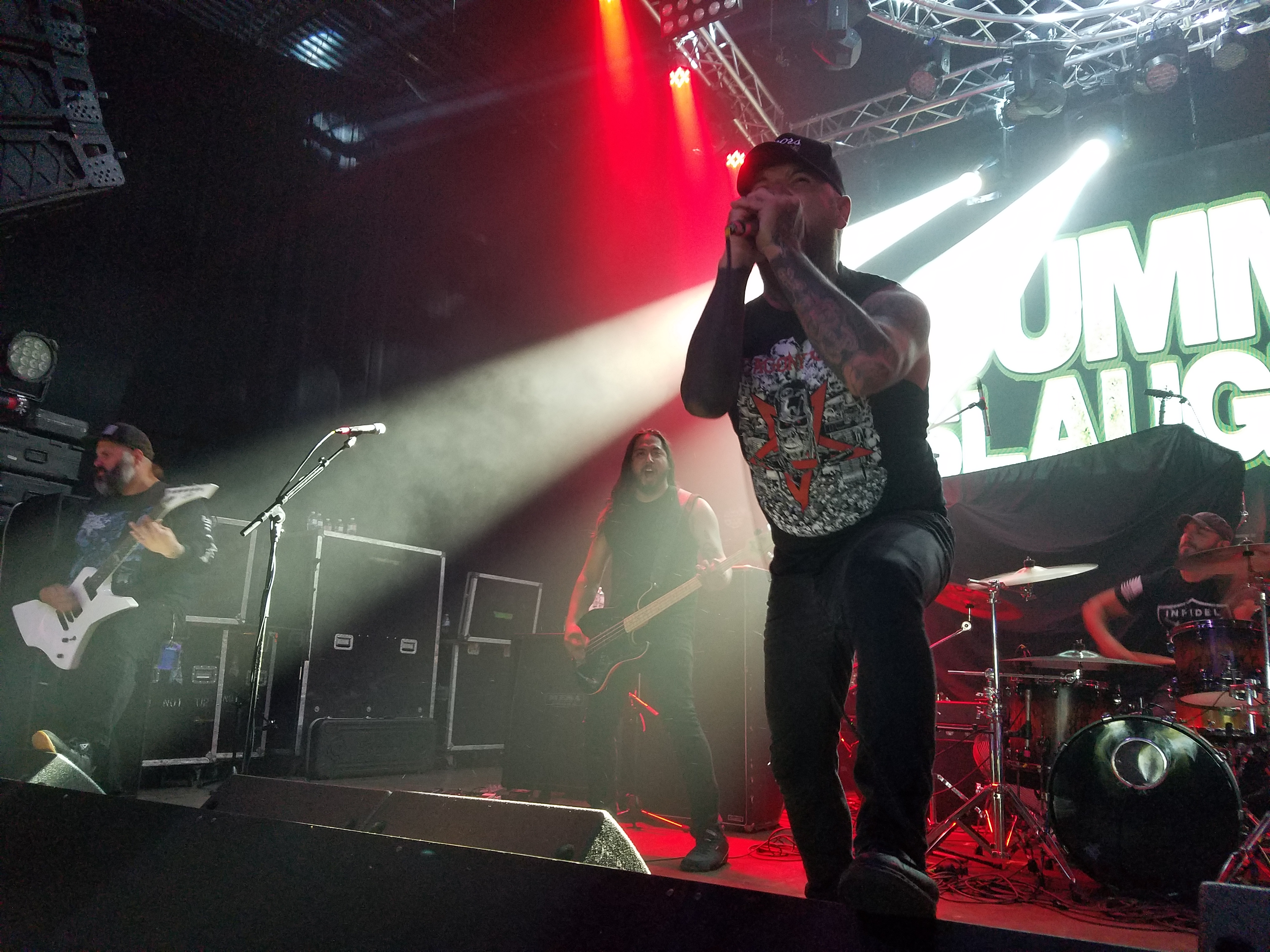
- The Agony Scene in 2018

Background information
- Origin: Tulsa, Oklahoma, U.S.
- Genres: Metalcore, melodic death metal
- Years active: 2001–2008, 2013–2019, 2025–present
- Labels: Solid State; Roadrunner; Abacus; Century Media; Outerloop
- Members: Chris Emmons; Mike Williams; Brian Hodges; BJ Sampson
- Past members: Jay White; Brian Stewart; Rod Burguiere; Matt Shannon; Ryan Folden; Matt Horwitz; Johnny Lloyd; Steven Kaye; Garrett Grover; Pete Webb; Brent Masters; Chris Rye

The Agony Scene is an American heavy metal band from Tulsa, Oklahoma. Formed in 2000, the group currently consists of lead guitarist Chris Emmons, vocalist and bassist Mike Williams, and rhythm guitarist and bassist Brian Hodges.

The band has released four albums, one on Solid State Records, one on Roadrunner Records, one on Century Media Records, and one on Outerloop Records. They had been signed to Abacus Records for a while until it folded.

== History ==
In 2000, three Tulsa musicians—Johnny Lloyd, Rod Burguiere, and Daniel Hickman— started a band named The Agony Scene. Originally looking to form a Christian metal band in the same vein as Zao and Overcome, Lloyd and Hickman took guitar duties with Burguiere on vocals. The arduous search for a rhythm section eventually exasperated Hickman, who left to join Tulsa metalcore outfit Enlow. Burguiere then looked to his former bandmates Mike Williams and Brent Masters and things began to mesh. The four piece, with Williams on bass and Masters on drums, eventually came across Chris Emmons as a second guitar and the lineup was solidified.

For the first year The Agony Scene made a name for themselves in the Tulsa hardcore scene and playing shows around the Midwest with fellow Tulsa acts Enlow and Plan B. In late 2001, Williams left the band to join Tulsa grind outfit Thirty Called Arson and was replaced by Garrett Grover.

The Agony Scene released their first studio recorded demo in January 2002, which subsequently landed in the hands of Seattle-based label Solid State Records, that eventually granted the band a record deal. Immediately following their performance at Cornerstone that year, Burguiere stepped down from vocal duties and was replaced by former bassist Mike Williams.

Although the band was signed on with Solid State Records for a time, which mostly signs Christian acts, The Agony Scene confirmed in an interview with HM magazine that they were not a religious band.

In late 2006 the band parted ways with drummer Brent Masters and invited Ryan Folden - a Spokane, Washington based drummer - to join the band.

In early 2008 the band dropped out of a tour with Himsa due to "some major personal situations that make performing on this tour impossible", according to Himsa's management, It was unknown at the time whether the group has subsequently managed to resolve such issues or had in fact broken up. The group's official website had also been shut down, which furthered the assumption that the group had disbanded. Vocalist Mike Williams put these assumptions to rest by explaining why they disbanded.

On August 10, 2016, the band announced that they were working on a new EP. On November 26, 2016, the band announced that they were not going to release an EP but rather release a full-length record, as well as tour extensively following its completion.

On April 25, 2018, the band announced that they have signed to Outerloop Records. They released their fourth full-length album, Tormentor, on July 20, 2018.

On September 1, 2020, the band issued a statement informing fans that Jay White, the band's former bassist, died of undisclosed causes.

On October 17, 2025 the band announced that their fifth album was in the works and that BJ Sampson (formerly of Enterprise Earth) had joined the band as a writer and guitar player.

== Members ==
Current members

- Chris Emmons – lead guitar (2001–2008, 2013–present)
- Mike Williams – lead vocals (2002–2008, 2013–present), bass (2001, 2003–2004, 2015–2016, 2020–present)
- Brian Hodges – rhythm guitar (2005–2008, 2013–present), bass (2004–2005, 2015–2016, 2020–present)
- BJ Sampson - third guitar (2025–present)

Former members

- Daniel Hickman – rhythm guitar (2001)
- Rod Burguiere – lead vocals (2001–2002)
- Brent Masters – drums (2001–2006, 2013–2015)
- Garrett Grover – bass (2001–2002)
- Johnny Lloyd – rhythm guitar (2001–2004)
- Matt Shannon – bass (2002–2003)
- Stephen Kaye – rhythm guitar (2004–2005)
- Brian Stewart – bass (2005–2006)
- Ryan Folden – drums (2006–2008)
- Chris Rye – bass (2006–2008, 2013–2015)
- Jay White – bass, backing vocals (2016–2020; died 2020)

Touring members

- Brandon Park – drums (2018–present)

Timeline

== Discography ==
Date of release	Title	Peak chart positions				Label
Date of release	Title	US (Note: All these peaks are from Billboard's Top Current Albums chart, not the regular Billboard 200 chart that also ranks catalog albums alongside current releases.)	US Heat	US Indie	US Rock (Note: All these peaks are from Billboard's Rock Album Sales chart, not the regular Top Rock Albums chart.)	Label
June 10, 2003	The Agony Scene	—	—	—	—	Solid State Records
May 24, 2005	The Darkest Red	—	17	—	—	Roadrunner Records
October 23, 2007	Get Damned	—	26	—	—	Century Media Records
July 20, 2018	Tormentor	57	—	9	14	Outerloop Records

=== Music videos ===
- "We Bury Our Dead at Dawn" (2003)
- "Prey" (2005)
- "Barnburner" (2007)
- "Hand of the Divine" (2018)
