= Jacobs Dream =

American power metal band

Jacob's Dream
- Origin: Columbus, Ohio, U.S.
- Genres: Power metal, progressive metal, Christian metal
- Years active: 1996–present
- Labels: Metal Blade
- Members: James Evans; Jon Noble; Gary Holtzman; Kevin Wright; David Taylor; Krin Val Christi
- Past members: Billy Queen; Derek Eddleblute; Patrik DePappe; Rick May; Chaz Bond; John Berry
- Website: jacobsdreamusa.wix.com/jacobs-dream/

Jacob's Dream is an American power metal band originally based in Columbus, Ohio. The band formed in the mid-1990s under the name of Iron Angel. Their first three full-length releases were released on the Metal Blade Records label.

== Biography ==
The band features bassist James Evans, guitarists Jon Noble and Krin Val Christi, drummer Gary Holtzman, and frontman Kevin Wright. The group's first major release was in 2000 with their self-titled album Jacobs Dream, which was released on Metal Blade Records. The band's original vocalist David Taylor left after the second album Theater of War due to family commitments. Taylor was replaced by ex-BioGenesis vocalist Chaz Bond, who first appeared on the 2005 album Drama of the Ages. In 2008, the band released the album Dominion Of Darkness, and the album Beneath the Shadows in 2009. In late 2013, Chaz bond left the band to concentrate on BioGenesis and was replaced by Kevin Wright. In July 2016, David Taylor returned to the band but unfortunately other commitments led to his departure in September 2018. Kevin Wright has returned to the band and is the current vocalist.

== Band members ==
Current

- James Evans - bass (1998-present)
- Jon Noble - lead guitar (1996-1999, 2000-2001, 2002-present)
- Gary Holtzman - drums (1996-1999, 2003-present), guitars (1999-2000)
- Kevin Wright - vocals (2014-2016, 2018-present)
- David Taylor - vocals (1996-2002, 2016-2018, 2023-present)
- Krin Val Christi - rhythm guitar (2023-present)

Former members

- John Berry - guitars, keyboards, vocals (1996-2022)
- Chaz Bond - vocals (2003-2013)
- Rick May - drums (?-2000)
- Derek Eddleblute - guitars (2001-2002)
- Billy Queen - drums (1999-2002)
- Steve Vaughan - drums
- Patrik DePappe - guitars, bass (1996-1998)
- Paul Whitt - guitars (1996-1999)
- Andy Frasure - guitars
- Ben Lamb - bass
- Mike Armstrong - drums

== Discography ==
- Jacobs Dream Demo (indie 1997)
- Jacobs Dream (Metal Blade 2000)
- Theater of War (Metal Blade 2001)
- Drama of the Ages (Metal Blade 2005)
- Dominion of Darkness (Indie 2008)
- Beneath the Shadows (2009)
- Sea of Destiny (2017)
