= Beseech =

Swedish gothic metal band

- Origin: Borås, Sweden
- Genre: Gothic metal
- Years active: 1992–2006; 2013–present
- Labels: Metal Blade Records; Pavement Music; Napalm Records; Despotz Records
- Members: Erik Molarin; Lotta Havaas (ex Höglin); Manne Engström; Daniel Lindgren (ex Elofsson); Jonas Strömberg; Christian Silver
- Past members: Tony Lejvell; Anna Andersson; Morgan Gredåker; Andreas Wiik; Nicklas Svensson; Jörgen Sjöberg; Mikael Back; Robert Vintervind; Klas Bolin; Johan Örnborg; Håkan Carlsson; Angelina Sahlgren Söder
- Website: Official website

Beseech is a gothic metal band from Borås, Sweden. They disbanded in 2006, and re-formed with a different line-up at the end of 2013 and again in 2024 now with the vocal duo Erik Molarin and Lotta Havaas (ex Höglin). Also rejoining the band is Daniel Lindgren (ex Elofsson) and Jonas Strömberg and a new drummer Christian Silver

== Band members ==
=== Current members ===
- Jonas Strömberg – drums (1999–2006), guitar (2024–)
- Erik Molarin – vocals (2001–2006, 2024–)
- Manne Engström – guitar (2004–2006) (2013–)
- Lotta Havaas (ex Höglin) – vocals (2000–2006, 2024–present)
- Daniel Lindgren (ex Elofsson) – bass guitar (1999–2006, 2024–present)
- Christian Silver – drums (2024–present)

=== Past members ===
- Mikael Back – keyboard (1997–2006)
- Jörgen Sjöberg – vocals (1992–1998) (1999–2001)
- Nicklas Svensson – drums (1998–1999)
- Andreas Wiik – bass guitar (1994–1998)
- Morgan Gredåker – drums (1992–1998)
- Anna Andersson – keyboard and vocals (1994–1996)
- Tony Lejvell – bass guitar (1992–1994)
- Robert Vintervind – guitar, programming, arrangements (1992–2006) (2013–2024)
- Klas Bohlin – guitar and backing vocals (1992–2003), vocals (2013–2024)
- Angelina Sahlgren Söder – vocals (2013–2024)
- Johan Örnborg – bass guitar (2013–2024)
- Håkan Carlsson – drums (2013–2024)

=== Live members ===
- Conny Pettersson - drums (2002)

== Discography ==
=== Demos ===
- A Lesser Kind of Evil (1992)
- Last Chapter (1994)
- Tears (1995)
- Beyond the Skies (2001)

=== Studio albums ===
- ...From a Bleeding Heart (1998)
- Black Emotions (2000)
- Souls Highway (2002)
- Drama (2004)
- Sunless Days (2005)
- My Darkness, Darkness (2016)
- Future. Present. Past. (2026)

=== Videos ===
- "Manmade Dreams" (2000)
- "Between the Lines" (2002)
- "Innerlane" (2005)
- "Gimme! Gimme! Gimme!" (Live 2006)
- "Highwayman" (2015)
- "The Shimmering" (2016)
- "Boundless Space" (2026)
- "End This" (2026)
- "Hesitation" (2026)

=== Singles ===
- "Beating Pulse" (2015)
- "Highwayman" (2015)
- "The Shimmering" (2016)
- "Gimme Gimme Gimme" (2025)
- "Boundless Space" (2026)
- "End This" (2026)
- "Hesitation" (2026)
- "Future. Present. Past." (2026)
