= Ten Tonne Dozer =

British groove metal band

- Origin: Shetland Islands, UK
- Genres: Groove metal; heavy metal; hard rock
- Years active: 2005–present
- Label: Unsigned
- Members: Dave Kok; Jamie Duncan; Jamie Dalziel; Barrie Scobie; Dean Williamson
- Past members: Matthew Robertson; Angus Goodlad; Gordon Gibson; Magnus Bradley; Jonathan Stevens; Michael Tait; Keith Nicol; Philip Hawick; Keith Neill

Ten Tonne Dozer is a groove metal band from the Shetland Islands, formed in 2005 by Tasmanian frontman Dave Kok and Shetlander Jamie Duncan. The current line-up consists of Kok on lead vocals, Duncan on guitar, Jamie Dalziel on guitar, Barrie Scobie on bass, and Dean Williamson on drums.

== History ==
The band have been active since 2005 and have appeared in numerous newspapers and magazines throughout the UK and abroad, as well as receiving much radio play nationally and internationally.

Tours include: Ten Tonne Rage Tour of UK/Europe in July 2008, Dozer Rage Tour of UK/Europe in May 2009, Stolen Dozer Tour in Sept 2009, March of the Dozer Tour of UK/Europe in June 2010, Mad As A Snake in a Hat Tour of UK 2011, and the Inside the Black Moon Tour covering UK/Europe in May 2012, which featured a gig slot at Wootrock VI in Heemskerk, NL. Joining them on this tour was Aberdeen metal act SEMPERFI. The last tour (pre-covid) was the Punching Through The Glory Hole which had the band gigging throughout UK/Europe in May 2014. 2023 sees the band on the UK tour Old Growth, New Blood.

In 2012, Ten Tonne Dozer came equal first winning 'Best International Act' for the Fudge Awards in Aberdeen, as well as winning the 'Best Metal' award for the Scottish Alternative Music Awards held in Glasgow.

2013 saw the band releasing their latest live album 'Uit de Buik – Duivel te Koop' which was recorded in Belgium during their 2012 UK/European tour.

In summer 2015, the band released their long-awaited studio album 'Monster'.

As of October 2015, the band has been on a break due to several family commitments among the members.

December 2017, finally sees the band slowing firing up again and getting back into action. A large tour was planned for 2019/2020 but due to the covid pandemic everything was put on hold.

In Dec 2022 the band finally gets back to playing gigs in England and Scotland after a 7-year hiatus of no mainland UK gigs. April and August 2023 has the band back on tour throughout the UK.

== Band members ==
=== Current members ===
- Dave Kok – vocals (2005–present)
- Jamie Duncan – lead guitar (2005–present)
- Jamie Dalziel – guitar (2012–present)
- Barrie Scobie – bass (2017–present)
- Dean Williamson – drums (2023–present)

=== Former members ===
- Matthew Robertson – bass (2005–2006)
- Angus Goodlad – drums (2005–2006)
- Gordon Gibson – bass (2006–2007)
- Magnus Bradley – bass (2007–2008)
- Jonathan Stevens – drums (2006–2010)
- Michael Tait – guitar (2005–2012)
- Keith Nicol – bass (2008–2013)
- Philip Hawick – bass (2013–2017)
- Keith Neill – drums (2010–2023)

=== Session/touring musicians ===
- Jamie Hatch – bass & guitar (since 2009 – gig musician when required)
- Capt Steve – guitar (since 2015 – gig musician when required)

== Discography ==
=== Studio albums ===
- Sheep Skull Buggery (2010)
- Black Moon Rising (2012)
- Monster (2015)
- I Smell Skin (2017)

=== Extended plays ===
- The Devil Rides Out (2005)
- The Valley (2007)

=== Live albums and DVDs ===
- Live March of the Dozer (2006)
- The Metal Chapter – Live in the Netherlands on RTW FM (2008)
- Ten Tonne Dozer – Live in Gouda DVD (2009)
- Live @ The Invergordon Arts Centre (2009)
- March of the Dozer DVD (2011)
- Uit De Buik – Duivel Te Koop (2013)
- MLK (Mareel Lockdown Knickers) (2021)
- Ho Ho Boom (2022)
- Mad as a Snake in a Hat Tour DVD (TBA)
