= Dirty Diamonds =

Studio album by Alice Cooper
- Released: July 4, 2005 (Europe, UK); August 2, 2005 (US)
- Studio: Future House Studios, Culver City, CA & Westside Independent Studios, Beverly Hills, CA
- Genre: Rock; hard rock; heavy metal
- Length: 46:46
- Label: New West, Spitfire
- Producer: Steve Lindsey, Rick Boston

Alice Cooper chronology
| School's Out and Other Hits (2004) | Dirty Diamonds (2005) | Live at Montreux 2005 (2006) |

Dirty Diamonds is the seventeenth solo and overall twenty-fourth studio album by American rock musician Alice Cooper, released on July 4, 2005, internationally, and August 2 in the US.

The album peaked on Billboard's "Top Independent Albums" chart at #17, and the Billboard 200 album chart at #169 – Cooper's highest-charting album since The Last Temptation, 11 years prior.

Professional ratings
Review scores
| Source | Rating |
|---|---|
| Allmusic | link |
| Blabbermouth.net | 6.5/10 link |
| Jukebox:Metal | link |
| Melodic.net | link |
| Revelationz | link |

== Track listing ==
| No. | Title | Writer(s) | Length |
|---|---|---|---|
| 1. | "Woman of Mass Distraction" | Alice Cooper, Damon Johnson, Ryan Roxie, Chuck Garric, Rick Boston | 3:59 |
| 2. | "Perfect" | Cooper, Johnson, Roxie | 3:30 |
| 3. | "You Make Me Wanna" | Cooper, Roxie, Garric, Boston | 3:30 |
| 4. | "Dirty Diamonds" | Cooper, Johnson, Garric, Boston | 4:02 |
| 5. | "The Saga of Jesse Jane" | Cooper, Roxie | 4:15 |
| 6. | "Sunset Babies (All Got Rabies)" | Cooper, Johnson, Roxie | 3:28 |
| 7. | "Pretty Ballerina" | Michael Brown | 3:01 |
| 8. | "Run Down the Devil" | Cooper, Mark Hudson, Mike Elizondo, Benji Hughes | 3:29 |
| 9. | "Steal That Car" | Cooper, Johnson, Roxie, Garric | 3:16 |
| 10. | "Six Hours" | Cooper, Roxie | 3:24 |
| 11. | "Your Own Worst Enemy" | Cooper, Roxie | 2:15 |
| 12. | "Zombie Dance" | Cooper, Roxie, Boston | 4:27 |
| 13. | "Stand (feat. Xzibit)" (bonus track on all releases) | Cooper, Boston, Bridget Benenate, Xzibit | 4:04 |
| 14. | "The Sharpest Pain" (bonus track on Russian and UK promo CD releases) | Cooper, Roxie | 3:59 |

== Personnel ==
- Alice Cooper – vocals, harmonica
- Ryan Roxie – guitars, backing vocals
- Damon Johnson – guitars, backing vocals (bass on "Perfect")
- Chuck Garric – bass, backing vocals
- Tommy Clufetos – drums, backing vocals
- Xzibit – rap on "Stand"
- Eric Singer – frequent drummer for Alice Cooper is pictured on the album booklet/tray, but does not play on Dirty Diamonds.

== Charts ==
| Chart (2005) | Peak position |
|---|---|
| Austrian Albums (Ö3 Austria) | 66 |
| Dutch Albums (Album Top 100) | 88 |
| French Albums (SNEP) | 159 |
| German Albums (Offizielle Top 100) | 71 |
| Scottish Albums (OCC) | 91 |
| Swedish Albums (Sverigetopplistan) | 40 |
| UK Albums (OCC) | 89 |
| UK Rock & Metal Albums (OCC) | 6 |
| US Billboard 200 | 169 |
| US Independent Albums (Billboard) | 17 |
