= Sheryl Cooper =

American dancer and stage performer

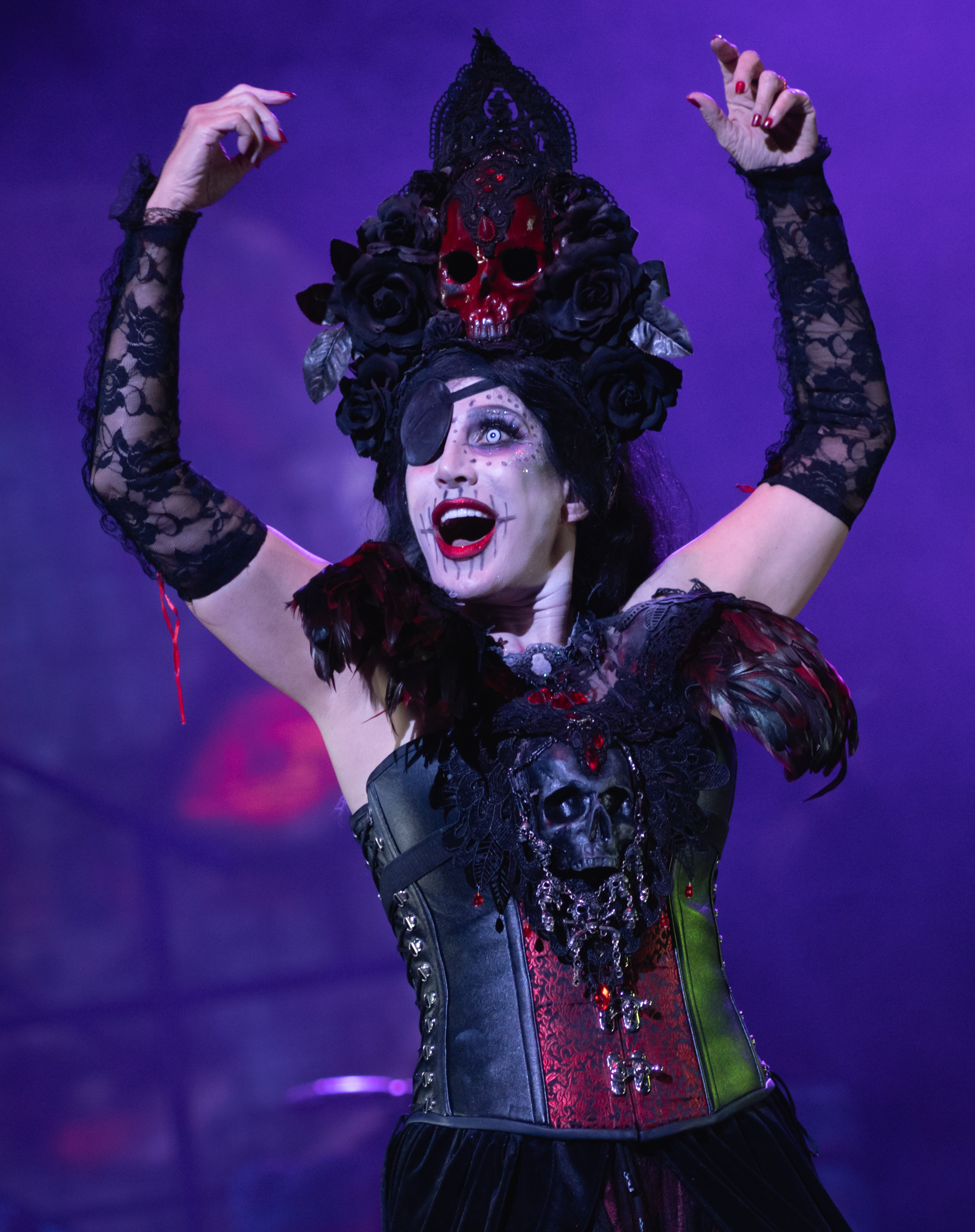
- Cooper in 2022
- Born: Sheryl Goddard; 1956 or 1957 (age 69–70); Denver, Colorado, U.S.
- Education: Citrus College
- Occupations: Dancer; dance instructor; theatrical producer; theater director; choreographer
- Spouse: Alice Cooper (m. 1976)
- Children: 3, including Calico

Sheryl Cooper (née Goddard, c. May 20, 1956) is an American dancer, stage performer, and the wife of the shock rock singer Alice Cooper. In addition to regularly performing on tour with her husband, she teaches, choreographs, produces, and directs children's dance and theatre in the Phoenix, Arizona area. She was also one of three co-founders of Alice Cooper's Solid Rock, a non-profit foundation for inner-city teens in Arizona.

== Biography and touring career ==
Sheryl Cooper was born Sheryl Goddard in Denver, Colorado. At age 3, her family moved to Connecticut while her father studied at Yale University. They then re-located to the Pasadena area of California. She began dancing at a young age, training in classical ballet until age 16, when she switched to jazz. Part of her schooling included an apprenticeship with Joffrey Ballet.

Sheryl met Alice in 1975 at the age of 18, when she auditioned as a dancer for his "Welcome to My Nightmare" tour. She was studying jazz at Citrus College when she became aware that Alice Cooper was holding auditions for two female and two male dancers for a one-and-one-half year contract which included a world tour, a television special, and stage appearances. With her classical music background, she was unfamiliar with rock music. "I knew everything about Bach, Rachmaninoff, Schumann, Mozart – but nothing about rock and roll. I could tell you who the Beatles were, and that was about it." When she found out about the auditions for Cooper's tour, she responded "Wow. Alice Cooper. Who is she?" "I thought I was auditioning for some blond, female folk singer." Around 3,000 women auditioned for the roles, and after two days, Sheryl was successful in landing a position as one of the dancers. At the time, Cooper's combination of rock and theater and the inclusion of dancers was unprecedented. At first, the two did not get along well. The first time she touched him, she was teaching him how to stretch and she hurt him. However, one night during the tour, Goddard joined other musicians and dancers at Cooper's hotel suite after a concert to eat pizza and watch horror movies. She found herself so engaged in conversation with Cooper that she failed to notice everyone else gradually leaving the room. When she got up to leave, he jokingly asked if she would kiss him goodnight. Sheryl granted him the request, more passionately than she expected. They dated for 12 months and married on March 20, 1976, in Acapulco, Mexico.

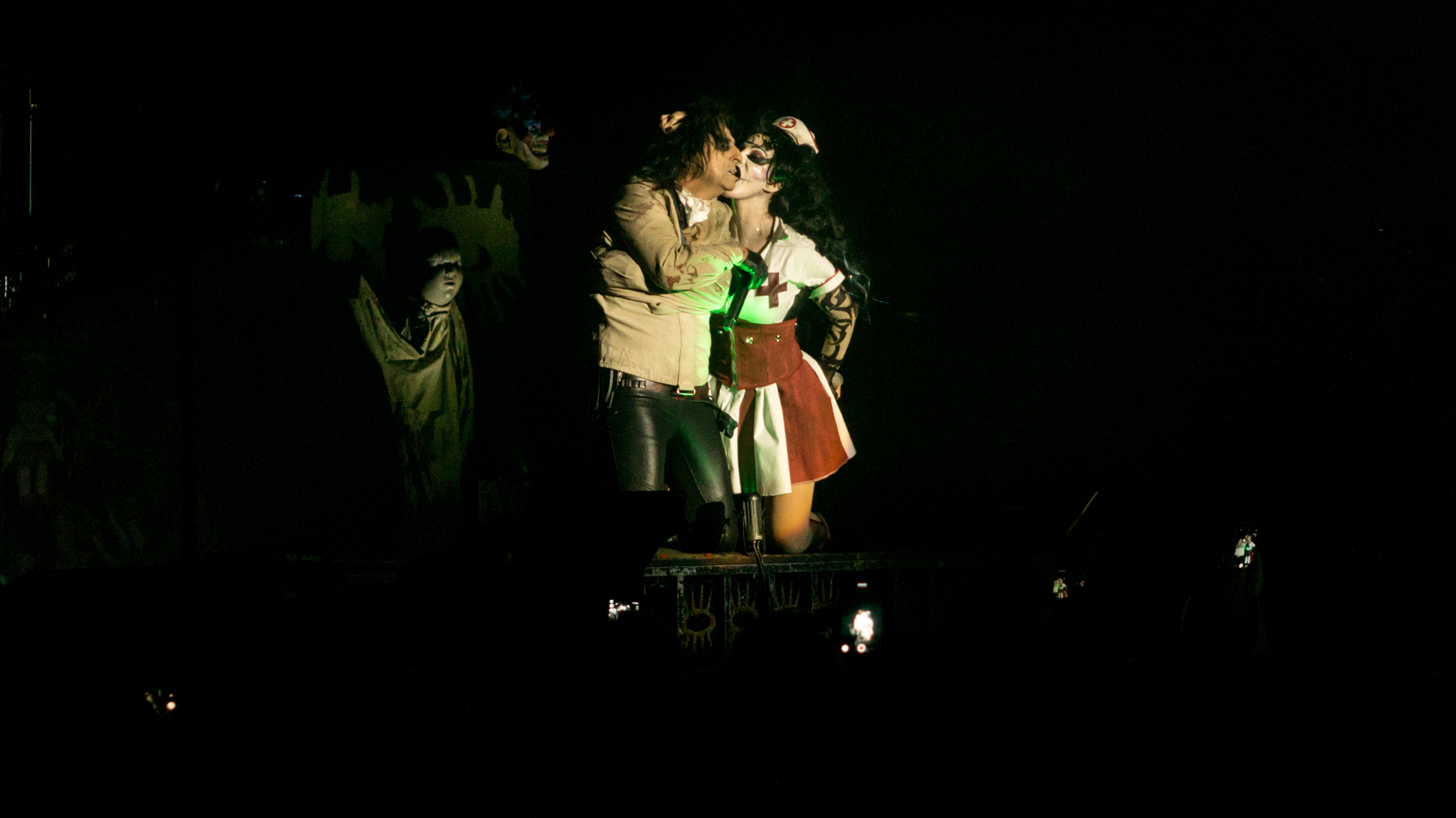
Sheryl (right) performing with Alice (left) at Wembley Arena in 2017.

In the second half of the 1970s, Alice became deeply consumed by alcoholism, going to rehab twice, in 1976 and 1979. Sheryl attempted to intervene for him. In the early 1980s, Alice also developed a cocaine addiction so severe that he has no memory of recording, or touring for, three albums from that period. Sheryl initiated divorce proceedings in November 1983. Alice finally committed to sobriety that year, and Sheryl reconciled with him months later in 1984.

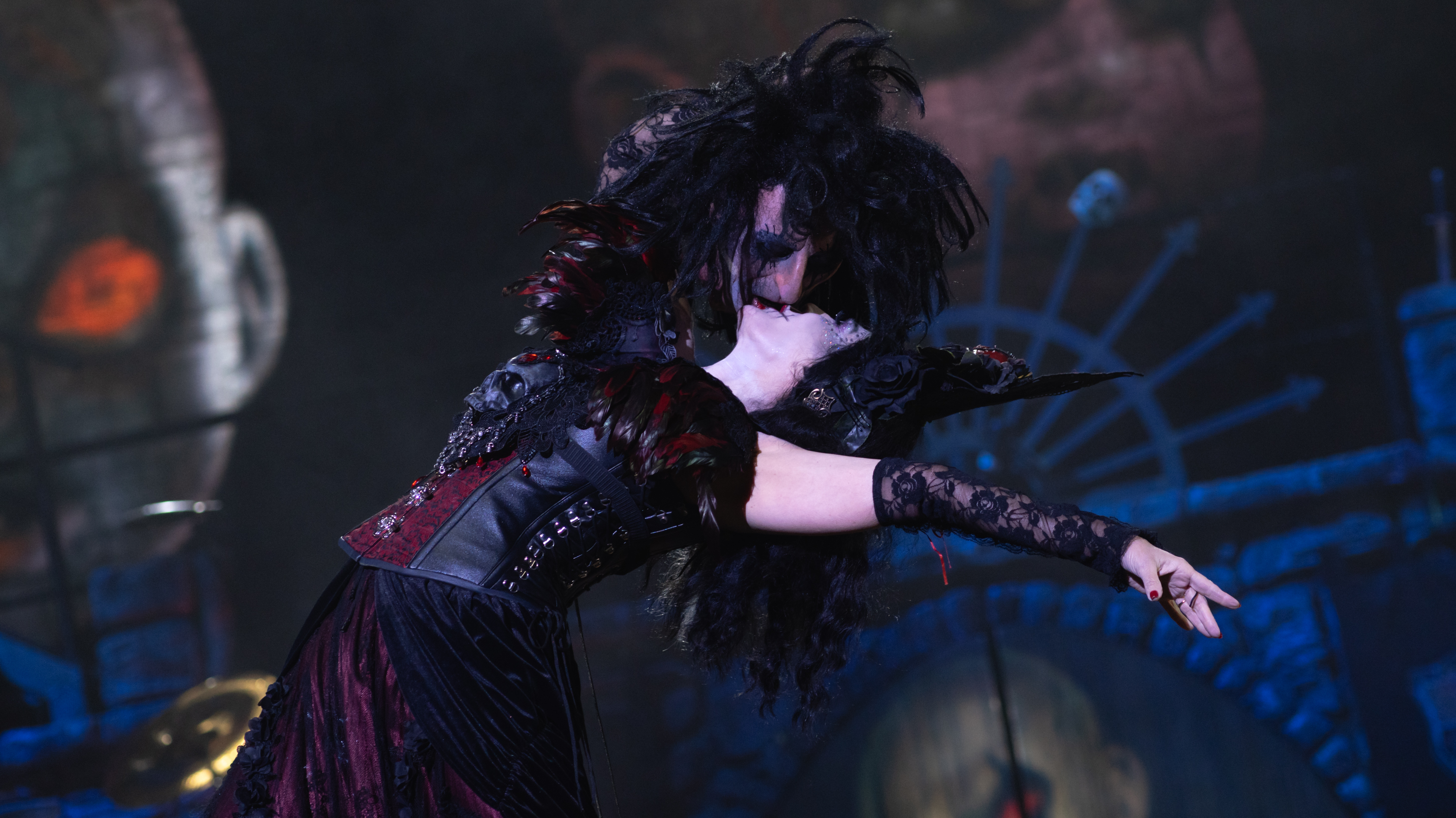
Cooper kissing a mock-up of Alice's severed head. At The O2 Arena in Greenwich, May 2022.

Since the start of her career in 1975, Sheryl frequently tours with her husband as a dancer, choreographer, and backing singer, although she went on hiatus when their children were young. Some performances have involved acts where Alice kills her or fails in his attempt to do so. A longstanding act is her portraying a sadistic ghoulish nurse (sometimes alongside their daughter Calico performing a similar character), a character who often beheads him. The beheadings are then followed up by her holding up and sometimes kissing the severed head while the band plays "I Love the Dead". In 1987, when Alice returned to touring after recovering from addiction, Sheryl portrayed a giant spider. Recent acts have seen her as a devil, a ghost, and a Marie Antoinette-style character which helps apprehend Alice and sends him to the guillotine. When her daughter Calico was hired by Alice in 2001 to perform instead of herself in the Brutal Planet tour, Sheryl instructed Calico in dancing while using a bullwhip, the "bullwhip girl" being a character Sheryl had previously portrayed.

== Additional work and projects ==
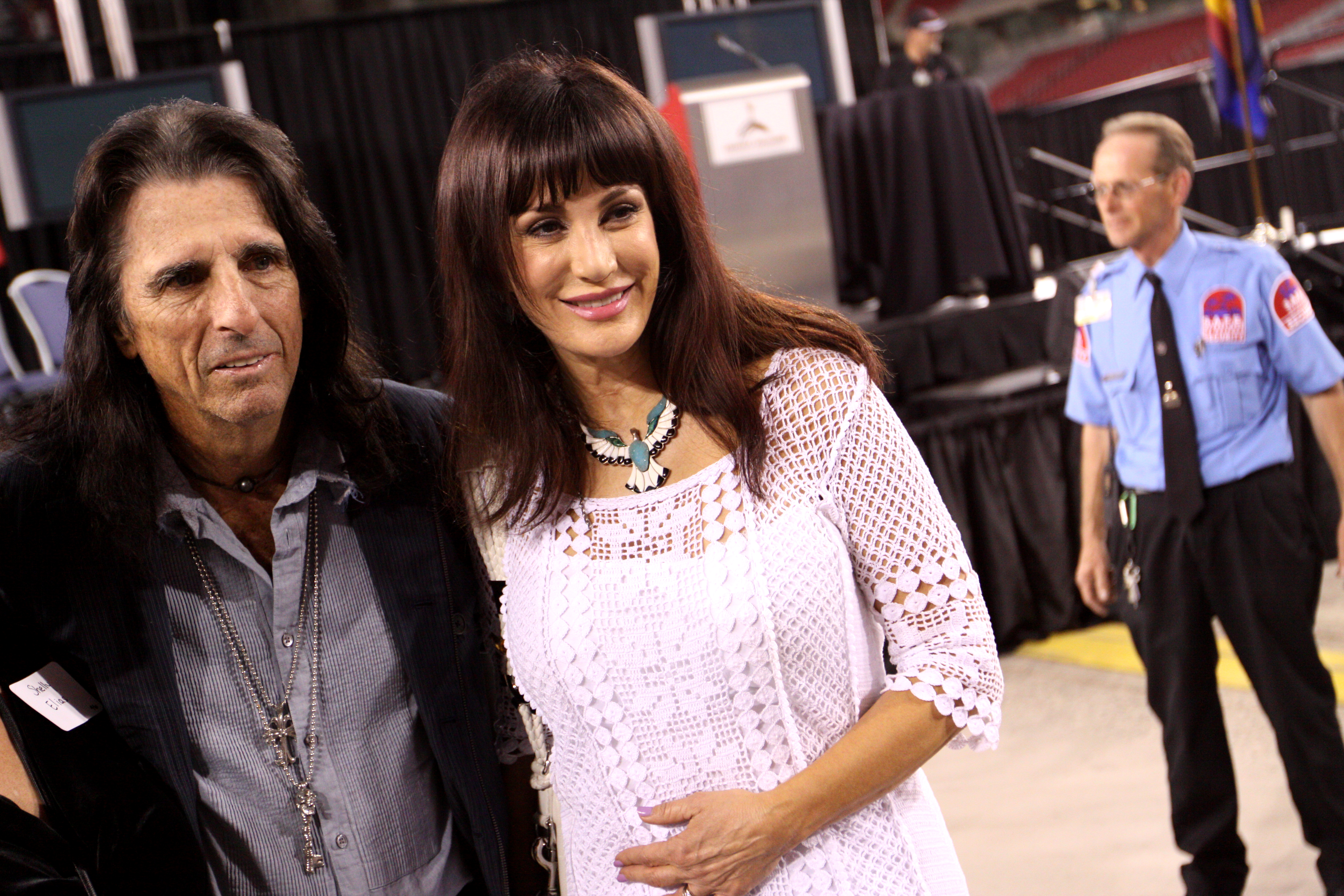
Alice and Sheryl Cooper at the Arizona Chamber of Commerce's 2013 Heritage Awards Dinner at the University of Phoenix Stadium in Glendale, Arizona

Cooper has instructed dance and choreography for decades. In the early 1980s, she taught at two Valley Profile for Dance studios in Paradise Valley, Arizona. In 1998, she was a choreography instructor for CC Dance. Since the mid-1990s, she and Alice have written, produced, and performed at the Hopi Variety Show, a talent show for Hopi Elementary School. In 1995, Sheryl and Alice, along with their friend Chuck Savale, founded Alice Cooper's Solid Rock, a non-profit foundation for inner-city teens in Arizona. After finding a benefactor, Genesis Church, the first center was opened in 2012, a second center opened in 2020, and the forthcoming opening of a third was announced 2023. An annual fundraiser for the non-profit, Alice Cooper's Christmas Pudding, is held every December in the form of a variety show and contest. In 2003, Cooper opened a 500-student dance school called Destiny Dance International. She then closed the school in 2007 to teach weekly at a Scottsdale location and devote more time to Solid Rock. She and her friend Lisa Savale co-founded a women's aerobics ministry at their church, Camelback Bible Church.

== Family ==
Sheryl and Alice have three children – Calico, Dashiel, and Sonora – and four grandchildren. Since 1985, she and Alice have lived in Paradise Valley.

== Discography ==
Year	Title	Artist	Credit
1977	From the Inside	Alice Cooper	Vocals
1999	The Life and Crimes of Alice Cooper	Alice Cooper	Vocals
2019	Rise	Hollywood Vampires	Vocals, composition, engineering
2021	Detroit Stories	Alice Cooper	Vocals, dancer
2023	Road	Alice Cooper	Vocals

== Videography ==
Year	Title	Role	Notes	Ref.
1975	Alice Cooper: The Nightmare	Cold Ethyl	Television special	
1976	Welcome to My Nightmare	Cold Ethyl	Concert video	
1977	"(No More) Love at Your Convenience" (by Alice Cooper)	Herself	Music video	
1978	Sgt. Pepper's Lonely Hearts Club Band		Feature film	
1979	The Strange Case of Alice Cooper	Herself - dancer	Concert video	
1980	Roadie	Herself - dancer	Feature film	
1982	Alice Cooper a Paris	Herself - dancer	Television special	
2014	Super Duper Alice Cooper	Herself; photography	Documentary	
2019	"Beginning of the End" (by Kane Roberts featuring Alice Cooper and Alissa White-Gluz)	Herself	Music video	
2021	A Paranormal Evening at the Olympia Paris	Herself	Concert film	
