= Drama of the Ages =

Studio album by Jacobs Dream
- Released: 2005
- Recorded: Anthem Studios
- Genres: Power metal, Christian metal
- Length: 70:55
- Label: Metal Blade Records
- Producer: Jacobs Dream

Jacobs Dream chronology
Theater of War (2001)	Drama of the Ages (2005)	Dominion of Darkness (2008)

Professional ratings
Review scores
Source	Rating
Allmusic	3.5/5 stars
Scream Magazine	4/6 stars

Drama of the Ages is the third album by metal band Jacobs Dream and was released in 2005. It is the first Jacobs Dream album to feature singer Chaz Bond on vocals. The album contains an untitled hidden song on the final track which is an instrumental version of Pachelbel's Canon in D.

== Track listing ==
1. "Drama of the Ages" – 4:45
2. "Keeper of the Crown" – 4:57
3. "Spinning Leaf" – 4:51
4. "Stand or Fall" – 5:09
5. "Tempest" – 5:13
6. "Third Way" – 4:44
7. "Forever Winter" – 6:11
8. "Drowning Man" – 4:59
9. "Deceiver of the Nations" - 6:32
10. "Cutting Words" - 5:53
11. "Victory" - 4:55
12. "At the Gates" - 6:47
13. "Untitled" (Pachelbel's Canon in D) - 5:50

== Credits ==
- Chaz Bond - vocals
- John Berry - guitars, synth, backing vocals
- Jon Noble - guitar, backing vocals
- James Evans - bass, backing vocals
- Gary Holtzman - drums
