= Sunless Days =

Studio album by Beseech
- Released: September 5, 2005
- Genre: Gothic metal
- Length: 43:23
- Label: Napalm Records

Beseech chronology
Drama (2003)	Sunless Days (2005)	My Darkness, Darkness (2016)

Sunless Days is Beseech's 5th album, released in 2005 by Napalm Records.

It was rated an eight out of ten by Metal Temple Magazine.

== Track listing ==
1. "Innerlane"
2. "The Outpost"
3. "A Bittersweet Tragedy"
4. "Everytime I Die"
5. "Devil's Plaything (Danzig cover)"
6. "Lost"
7. "Last Obsession"
8. "Emotional Decay"
9. "Restless Dreams"
10. "The Reversed Mind"

== Digipak bonus tracks ==
11. "Manmade Dreams (2005)"
12. "Lost (Emotional Version)"

== Personnel ==
- Erik Molarin - Vocals
- Lotta Höglin - Vocals
- Robert Vintervind - Guitar
- Manne Engström - Guitar
- Daniel Elofsson - Bass
- Jonas Strömberg - Drums
- Mikael Back - Keyboards
