= Chuck Garric =

American bassist

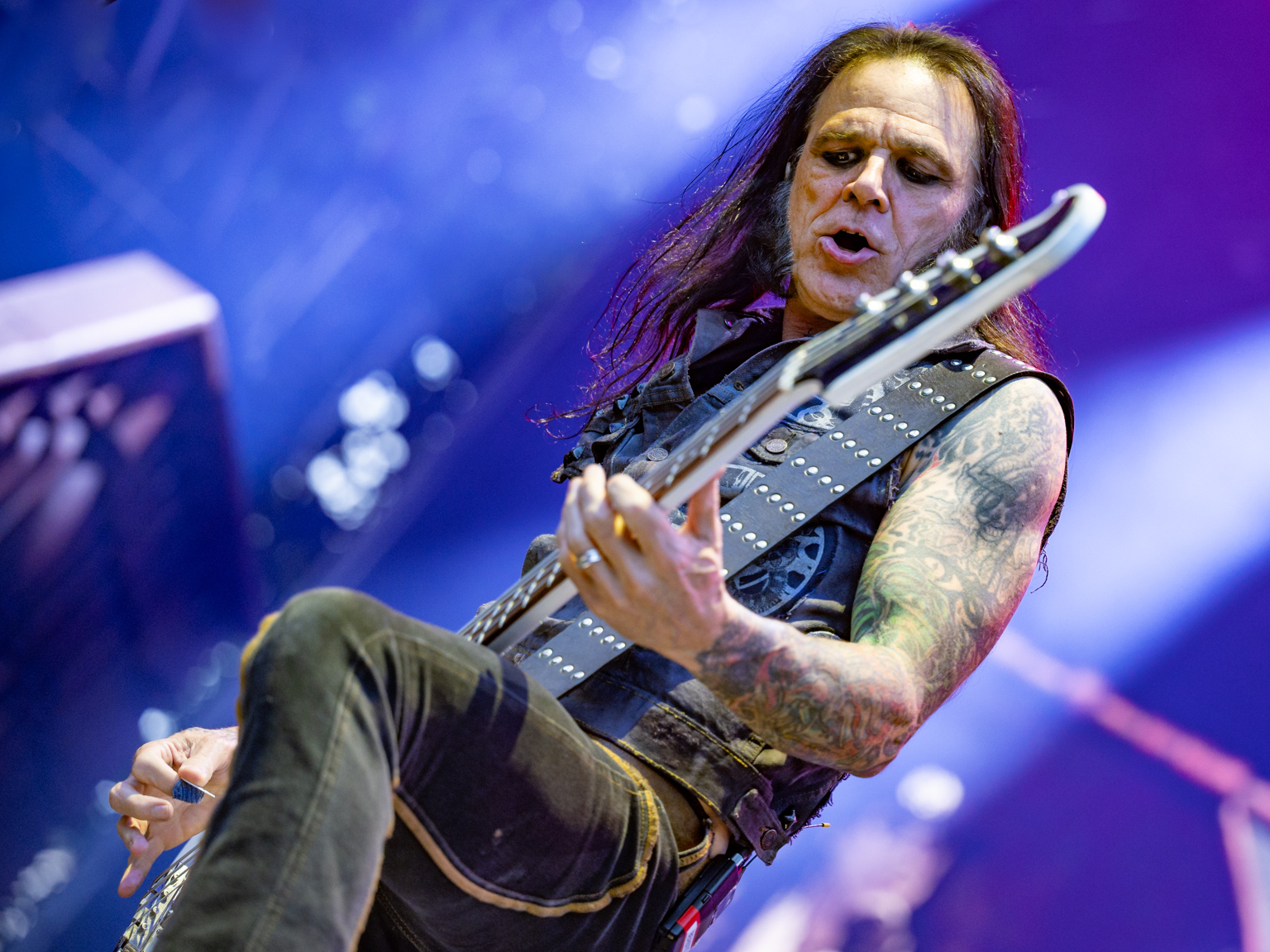
- Garric performing with Alice Cooper in 2024

Background information
- Occupation: Bassist
- Years active: Mid-1990s–present

Chuck Garric is an American rock bassist who has played with Turd, The Barons, The Druts, L.A. Guns, Dio, and Eric Singer Project (ESP). The current bassist for Alice Cooper, Garric has played bass for Billy Bob Thornton, Ted Nugent, Don Felder, and Journey at the Alice Cooper Christmas Pudding for the past three years.

Turd released two records: Turd Up the Volume and Turdville U.S.A. Garric and Jon Morris from Turd both played in Gene Loves Jezebel for a very short time.

With L.A. Guns, he was the touring bassist during part of the time Jizzy Pearl was the band's singer, and replaced touring bassist Stefan Adika, and was himself reportedly fired due to the return of the original lineup.

Garric toured with Dio in 1999–2000 in support of the Magica record. He also co-wrote the song "Death by Love", which appeared on the Dio record Master of the Moon.

Garric has been with Alice Cooper since 2003. He has played on the Eyes of Alice Cooper record and Dirty Diamonds record. He also played on Alice Cooper's 2008 release Along Came a Spider and co-wrote two of the songs on the recording.

Garric was the featured bass player for Rikki Rockets solo release Glitter 4 the Soul.

Garric is also in an original band named Beasto Blanco that released a self-titled CD in 2013.

Garric was the owner of VoiceTrax West recording studio in Studio City, California.
