= Damaged goods =

Damaged goods or Damaged Goods may refer to:

- Goods that have been damaged, where goods are items that satisfy human wants and provide utility

== Film and theatre ==
- Damaged Goods (play), a 1901 play by Eugène Brieux, published in French as Les Avariés
  - Damaged Goods (1914 film), an American silent film based on the play
  - Damaged Goods (1919 film), a British silent film based on the play
  - Damaged Goods (1937 film), an American drama film based on the play
- Damaged Goods, a 2008 animated film by Barnaby Barford
- "Damaged Goods", a segment of The Turning (2013 film)

== Literature ==
- Damaged Goods (Davies novel), a 1996 original Doctor Who novel
- Damaged Goods, a 2012 novel by Alexandra Allred
- "Damaged Goods", a short story in The Turning (short story collection)

== Music ==
- Damaged Goods (record label), a British independent record label
- Damaged Goods (album), a 1995 album by Nils Lofgren
- Damaged Goods, a 2011 album by Hellbound Glory
- Damaged Goods, a 2006 album by Lennon Murphy
- Damaged Goods, a 2000 album by The Great Crusades
- Damaged Goods, a 2012 album by The Mohawk Lodge
- Damaged Goods, a 2018 album by Sinead Burgess
- "Damaged Goods" (song), by Gang of Four, 1978
- "Damaged Goods", a song by La Dispute from the 2008 album Somewhere at the Bottom of the River Between Vega and Altair
- Damaged Good, a 2016 album by Bettie Serveert

== Other uses ==
- Damaged Goods, a dance company of Meg Stuart, from 1994
- "Damaged Goods", an episode of Pacific Blue season 4, 1998

== See also ==
- Good (disambiguation)
- Crippleware, computer software or hardware with disabled features
- Emotional conflict
- Damaged Lives, a 1933 Canadian/American film based on Brieux's play
