= Comiskey Park =

Chicago White Sox baseball park (1910–1990)

- The Baseball Palace of the World; Old Comiskey Park; White Sox Park
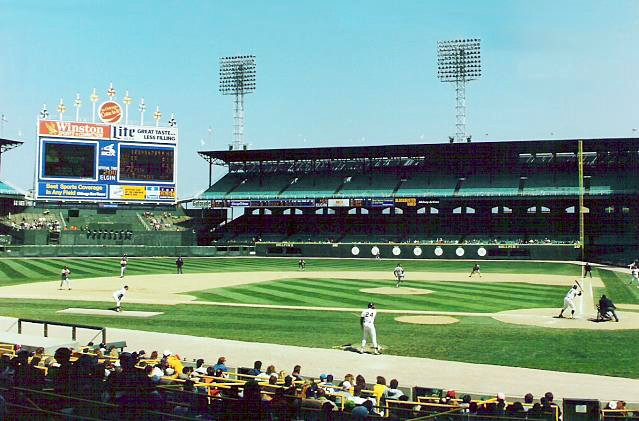
- Comiskey Park in 1990, its final season
- Interactive map of Comiskey Park
- Former names: White Sox Park (1910–1912, 1962–1975)
- Location: 324 West 35th Street; Chicago, Illinois
- Coordinates: 41°49′54″N 87°38′03″W
- Owner: Chicago White Sox
- Operator: Chicago White Sox
- Capacity: 28,000 (1910–1926); 52,000 (1927–1937); 50,000 (1938); 51,000 (1939); 50,000 (1940–1946); 47,400 (1947–1953); 46,550 (1954–1972); 44,492 (1973–1982); 43,695 (1983–1985); 44,087 (1986–1987); 43,931 (1988–1989); 43,951 (1990)
- Surface: Natural grass AstroTurf infield (1969–1975)
- Record attendance: 55,555 (largest); May 20, 1973; White Sox vs. Minnesota; 511 (smallest); May 6, 1971; White Sox vs. Boston
- Field size: (1910); Foul lines – 363 ft (111 m); Power alleys – 382 ft (116 m); Center field – 420 ft (128 m); Backstop – 98 ft (30 m) (1986); Foul lines – 347 ft (106 m); Power alleys – 382 ft (116 m); Center Field – 409 ft (125 m); Backstop – 86 ft (26 m)

Construction
- Groundbreaking: 1910
- Opened: July 1, 1910
- Closed: September 30, 1990
- Demolished: 1991
- Cost: US$750,000 ($25.9 million in 2025)
- Architects: Zachary Taylor Davis; Osborn Engineering
- General contractor: George W. Jackson

Tenants
- Chicago White Sox (MLB) (1910–1990); Chicago Cardinals (NFL) (1922–1925, 1929–1930, 1940–1958); Chicago Bulls (AFL) (1926); Chicago American Giants (NAL) (1941–1952); Card-Pitt (NFL) (1944); Chicago Mustangs (NASL) (1967–1968); Chicago Sting (NASL) (1980–1985)

Comiskey Park was a ballpark in Chicago, Illinois, located in the Armour Square neighborhood on the near-south side of the city. The stadium served as the home of the Chicago White Sox of the American League from 1910 through 1990. Built by White Sox owner Charles Comiskey and designed by Zachary Taylor Davis, Comiskey Park hosted four World Series and more than 6,000 Major League Baseball games. The field also hosted one of the most famous boxing matches in history: Joe Louis' defeat of champion James J. Braddock, launching his 11-year run as the heavyweight champion of the world.

The Chicago Cardinals of the National Football League also called Comiskey Park home when they were not playing at Normal Park, Soldier Field, or Wrigley Field. They won the 1947 NFL Championship Game over the Philadelphia Eagles at Comiskey Park. Much less popular than the Bears, the Cardinals had their last season at Comiskey in 1958, and they left for St. Louis in March 1960. The Chicago American Giants of the Negro American League called Comiskey Park home from 1941 to 1950. The park was also home to the Chicago Mustangs and Chicago Sting of the NASL, and hosted the final edition of the original Soccer Bowl.

The park was demolished in 1991, after a new Comiskey Park stadium (later renamed U.S. Cellular Field, then Rate Field) opened just to the south.

== Early years ==
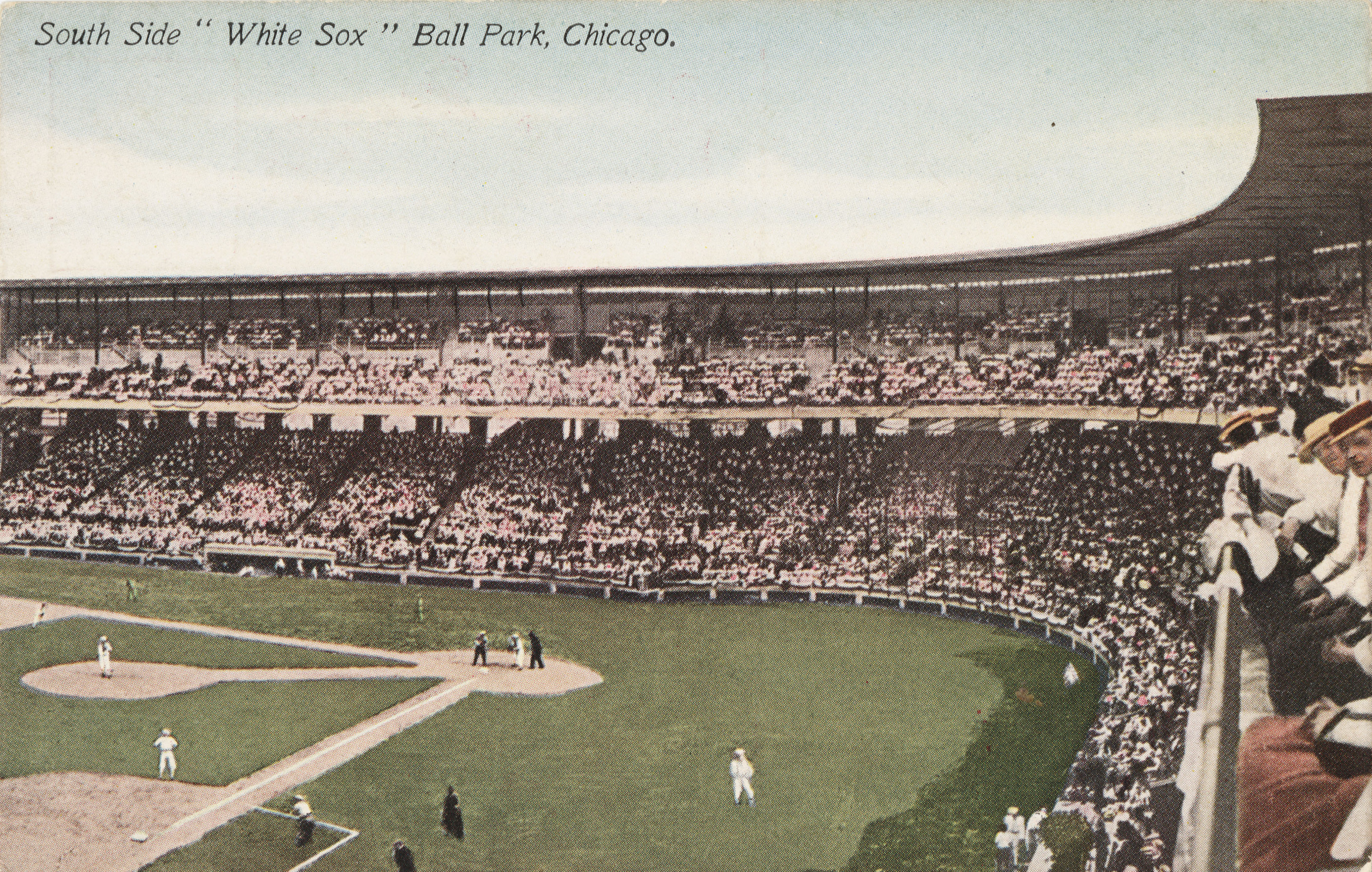
Comiskey Park in 1913. The "South Side" label refers to the White Sox themselves, not the stadium.

White Sox Park was built on a former city dump that Charles Comiskey bought in 1909 to replace the wooden South Side Park. Within three years, it was renamed Comiskey Park. The original name was restored in 1962, then it changed back to Comiskey Park in 1976.

On April 22, 1923, the park was subject to a bombing, suspected to be labor unions in response to it being painted by Landis Award, open shop, painters. During a time of unrest due to an employer movement to weaken labor unions.

Comiskey Park was very modern for its time. It was the third concrete-and-steel stadium in the major leagues to be built since 1909. As originally built, it seated almost 32,000, a record at the time. Briefly, it retained the nickname "The Baseball Palace of the World". Light towers were added in 1939.

The park's design was strongly influenced by Sox pitcher Ed Walsh and was known for its pitcher-friendly proportions 362 feet (110 m) to the foul poles; 420 ft (128 m) to center field). Later changes were made, but the park remained more or less favorable to defensive teams. For many years this reflected on the White Sox style of play: solid defense, and short, quick hits. The park was unusual in that no player hit 100 home runs there: Carlton Fisk set the record with 94.

The first game in Comiskey Park was a 2–0 loss to the St. Louis Browns on July 1, 1910. The first no-hitter at Comiskey Park was in 1911, hurled by Ed Walsh on August 27, a 5–0 win over Boston. The Sox won their first home night game, over St. Louis on August 14, 1939, 5–2.

The ballpark was significantly expanded during the 1926–1927 off-season. The single-deck pavilions and the outfield bleachers were replaced by a double-decked stand which surrounded almost the entire field except for a new, small bleacher section in straightaway centerfield.

== Special baseball events ==
=== World Series ===
Comiskey Park was the site of four World Series contests. In 1917, the Chicago White Sox won Games 1, 2 and 5 at Comiskey Park and went on to defeat the New York Giants four games to two. In 1918, Comiskey Park hosted the World Series between the Chicago Cubs and Boston Red Sox. The Cubs borrowed Comiskey Park for the series because of its larger seating capacity. The Red Sox defeated the Cubs four games to two. Games 1–3 were played at Comiskey Park. The Red Sox won games one and three. Attendance was under capacity in that war year. The best crowd was Game 3, with some 27,000 patrons.

In 1919, the White Sox lost the infamous "Black Sox" World Series to the Cincinnati Reds, five games to three in a nine-game series. Games three, four, five and eight were played at Comiskey Park. The White Sox won game three and lost games four, five and eight.

In 1959, the White Sox lost four games to two to the Los Angeles Dodgers. Games one, two and six were played at Comiskey Park. The White Sox won game one and lost games two and six. With their win in Game 6 at Comiskey Park, the Los Angeles Dodgers became the first West Coast team to win a World Series.

Comiskey saw its last post-season action in 1983, when the White Sox lost the American League Championship Series to the Baltimore Orioles 3–1. The White Sox lost both of their home games (Games 3 and 4). Baltimore went on to win the World Series.

=== All-Star Games ===
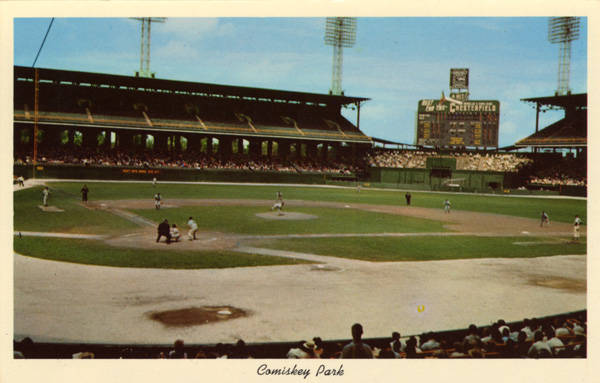
Comiskey Park in 1954

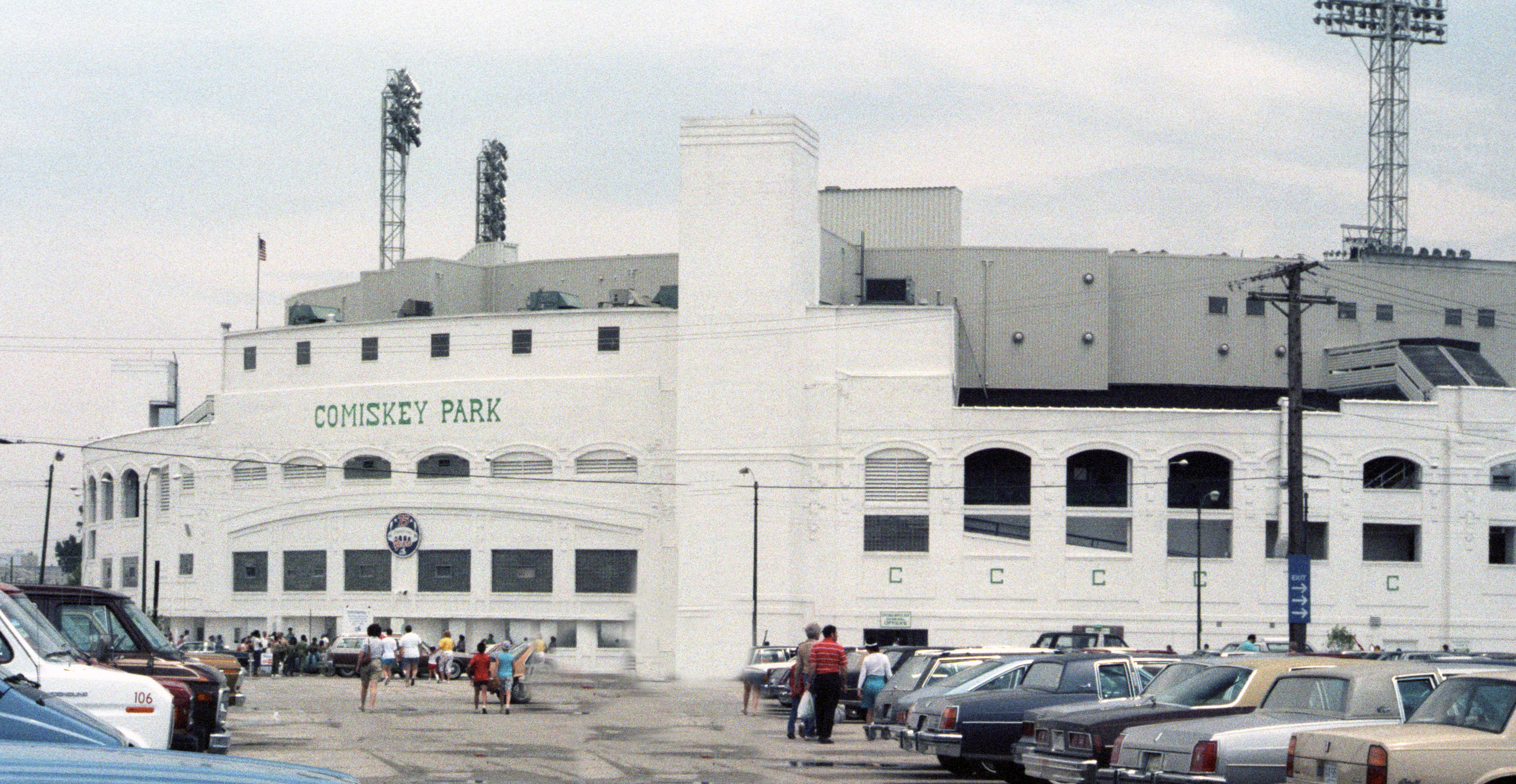
Comiskey Park in 1986

Comiskey Park was the site of three Major League Baseball All-Star Games, and each marked a turn in the direction of dominance by one league or the other:

- The first All-Star Game was held in 1933. It began as a promotion by Arch Ward, sports editor of the Chicago Tribune, in connection with the 1933 Century of Progress Exposition being held on Chicago's lakefront. The Americans defeated the Nationals, helped in part by a home run by Babe Ruth, who was nearing the end of his career, but could still swing a mighty bat. The game also inaugurated a stretch when the Americans dominated, winning 12 of the first 16 (skipping 1945 because of wartime travel restrictions).
- The park next hosted the July classic in 1950, a game best remembered for Ted Williams' collision with the outfield wall that broke his elbow and ended his playing season. Less remembered is that it began a turnaround for the Nationals, who won the game in extra innings and started to win frequently, a trend that continued for more than three decades, building up an astounding 30 wins against only 6 losses and 1 tie (from 1959 to 1962 two games were held each year).
- The 50th Anniversary All-Star Game in 1983 was held at Comiskey Park in commemoration of the first All-Star Game at that same venue. The American League's lopsided win, including the first-ever grand slam in an All-Star Game, by Fred Lynn, turned out to signal an end to the National League's dominance in the mid-summer classic. During the last eight years of the park's existence the Americans went 5–3. Hosting a winning All-Star Game was also a good omen for the Sox, as they won their division in 1983, the first baseball title of any kind in Chicago since the Sox won the 1959 pennant.
- Comiskey Park was the most frequent home to the Negro leagues East-West All-Star Game from 1933 to 1960. The Negro leagues' all-star game achieved higher attendance in some years than its Major League Baseball counterpart, thanks in part to Comiskey's high attendance capacity.

== Fans ==
From 1971 until its demolition in 1991, Comiskey was the oldest park still in use in Major League Baseball (it had already been the oldest in the American League since 1955). Many of its known characteristics, such as the pinwheels on the "exploding" scoreboard, were installed by Bill Veeck (owner of the White Sox from 1959 to 1961, and again from 1976 to 1981). Another Veeck innovation was the "picnic area", created by replacing portions of the left field walls (the side of the field not facing the setting sun) with screens and setting up picnic tables under the seating areas. This concept was later extended to right field. During Veeck's second ownership, he installed a shower behind the speaker horns in the center field bleachers, for fans to cool off on hot summer days.

From 1960 to 1990, Sox fans were also entertained by Andy the Clown, famous for his famous Jerry Colonna-like elongated cry, "Come ooooooooooon, go! White! Sox!"

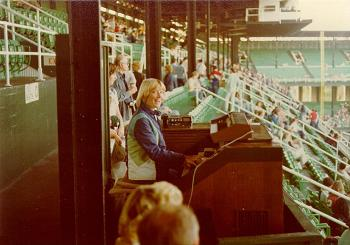
Longtime White Sox organist Nancy Faust

Starting in the 1970s, Sox fans were entertained by organist Nancy Faust who played along with crowd chants such as, "We will, we will, SOX YOU!". She also help popularize the now-famous farewell chant to departing pitchers and ejected managers, "Na-na-na-na, na-na-na-na, hey-hey, GOOD-BYE!"

Before he became an institution on the north side with the Cubs, Sox broadcaster Harry Caray was a south side icon. At some point he started "conducting" Take Me Out to the Ball Game during the seventh-inning stretch, egged on by Veeck, who (according to Harry himself) said that the fans would sing along when they realized that none of them sang any worse than Harry did; Caray would take this tradition with him to the Cubs at Wrigley Field, which has continued even with Caray's death in 1998. Harry would sometimes broadcast from the center field bleachers, where he could hobnob with fans and get a suntan (or a burn).

The largest crowd at Old Comiskey Park was in 1973, with a crowd of 55,555 (which was 11,063 over capacity) on May 20 for a doubleheader against the Minnesota Twins, which also had the promotion of "Bat Day". By contrast, just over two years earlier, the smallest attendance at the park was recorded, with 511 spectators attending a game against the Boston Red Sox on Thursday, May 6, 1971.

=== Disco Demolition Night ===
A major and oft-mentioned promotional event held at Old Comiskey was "Disco Demolition Night" in 1979, organized by longtime Chicago radio personality Steve Dahl and White Sox promotions manager Mike Veeck (Bill's son) on Thursday, July 12. Between games of a make-up doubleheader between the White Sox and the Detroit Tigers, Dahl and his crew destroyed a pile of disco records that fans had brought in exchange for a ticket with a discounted price of 98¢ in honor of Dahl's station at that time, WLUP-FM, the frequency of which was 97.9 MHz (98 FM). More than 50,000 fans were in attendance, along with another 20,000 who crashed the gates even though the game was sold out. The demolition tore a huge hole in center field and several thousand fans, many of them intoxicated, stormed the field, stole equipment, and destroyed the infield. The nightcap was postponed, but league officials ruled it a forfeit the next day, the fourth in American League history, all in the 1970s. Later, some blamed Dahl; some blamed Veeck. Howard Cosell even blamed then-White Sox announcer Harry Caray, saying Caray contributed to a "carnival" atmosphere. In reality, a handful of rowdies had taken advantage of a situation for which stadium security was woefully unprepared. "I never thought that I, a stupid disc jockey, could draw 70,000 people to a disco demolition," Dahl said in a Tribune interview. "Unfortunately, some of our followers got a little carried away." That was the last anti-disco rally for WLUP. But it brought Dahl national attention and established him as a radio superstar in Chicago.

== Transitions ==
When Bill Veeck re-acquired the team, he took out the center field fence, reverting to the original distance to the wall (posted as 440 in the 1940s, re-measured as 445 in the 1970s) ... a tough target, but reachable by sluggers like Oscar Gamble and Richie Zisk and other members of a team that was tagged "The South Side Hit Men". They were long removed from their days as "The Hitless Wonders". During that time the ballpark also featured a lounge where one could buy mixed drinks. This prompted some writers to dub Comiskey "Chicago's Largest Outdoor Saloon".

== Final years ==
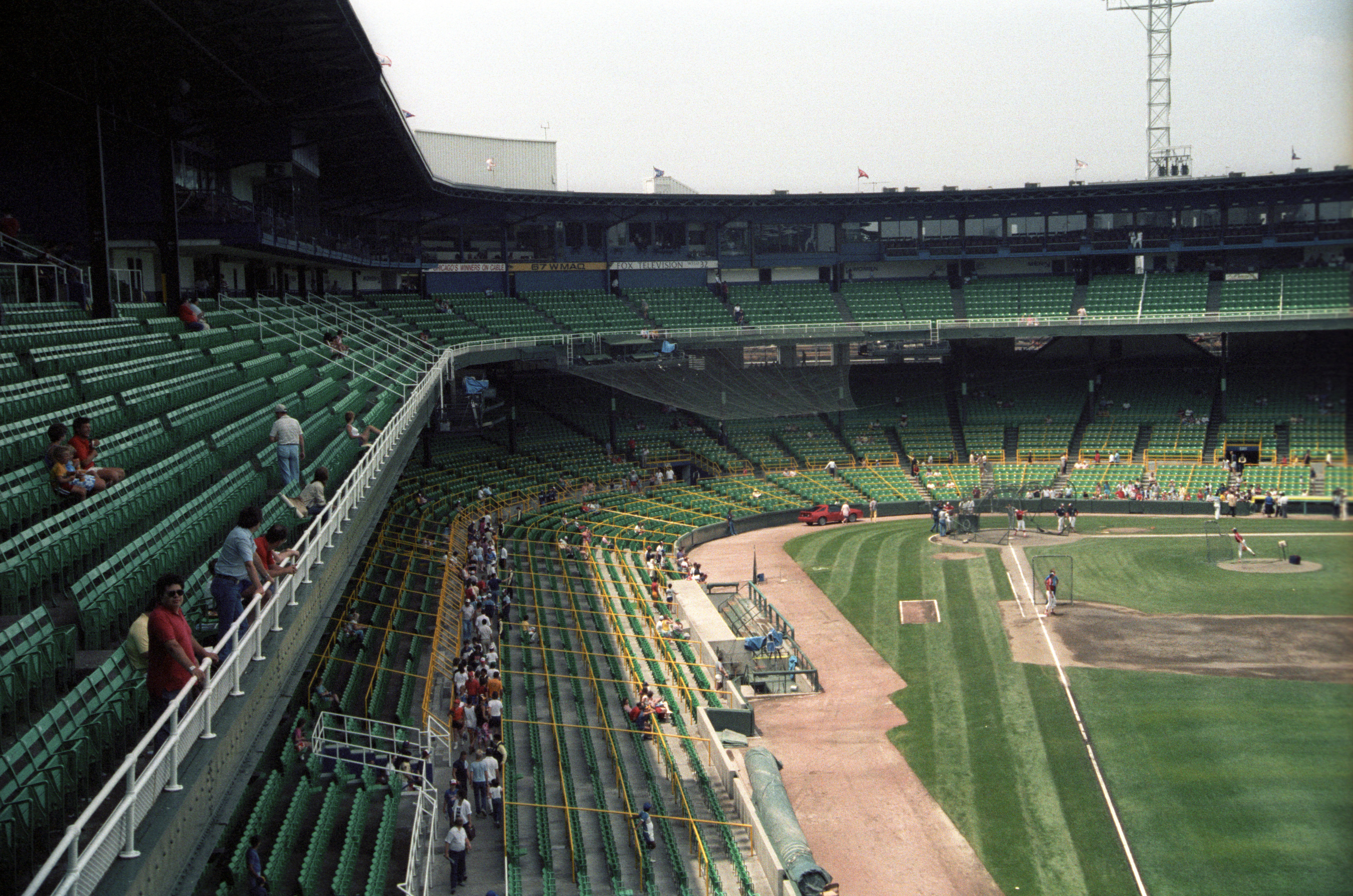
Batting practice in 1986

In 1969, AstroTurf was installed in the infield and the adjacent foul territory, with the outfield and adjoining foul territory remaining as natural grass. It was the first outdoor field in the major leagues to install artificial turf. After seven seasons, the artificial turf was removed prior to the 1976 season.

During its last eight years, Comiskey's annual attendance surpassed the two million mark three times, including the final season when the Sox contended for much of the year before losing the western division title to the Oakland Athletics.

White Sox owner Jerry Reinsdorf received more than $200 million in public financing for the new stadium after threatening to move the club to St. Petersburg, Florida (a similar threat was later used by the San Francisco Giants until they broke ground on what would be their current ballpark in late 1997). An interesting phenomenon occurred in the Illinois state legislature, in that the Speaker (Michael Madigan) stopped the clock on the evening of June 30, 1988, so that the legislature could report that the money had been granted on June 30, and not July 1. The stadium now called Tropicana Field was constructed by officials in St. Petersburg in an effort to lure a Major League Baseball club to Florida (which arrived in 1998 in the form of the expansion Devil Rays), but Miami beat the Tampa Bay area to the punch when it launched the expansion Florida Marlins in 1993. The deal was sealed in a last-minute legislative maneuver by then-governor James R. Thompson.

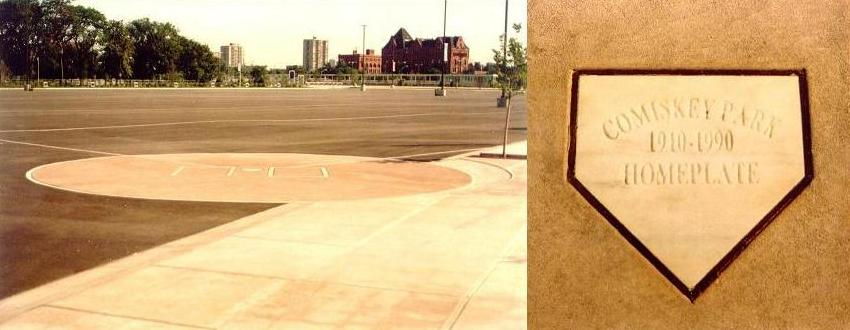
Site of Comiskey Park as it looked in 1992

On September 30, 1990, with 42,849 in paid attendance, the Chicago White Sox played the last game at Comiskey Park, defeating the Seattle Mariners 2–1. Mayor Richard M. Daley (a lifelong White Sox fan) threw out the opening pitch, legendary Sox player Minnie Miñoso delivered the lineup card to the umpires, and well-known ball-park organist Nancy Faust played for the crowd during the final game. Also, former White Sox Vice President Chuck Comiskey, grandson of the man for whom the park was named, was on hand. The final play occurred when White Sox closer Bobby Thigpen forced Mariners' second baseman Harold Reynolds to hit a grounder to second baseman Scott Fletcher, who in return threw it to first baseman Steve Lyons for the force-out. The crowd then joined the organist by singing a final rendition of their unofficial victory song "Na Na Hey Hey Kiss Him Goodbye".

Comiskey Park was demolished in 1991; starting from behind the right field corner, the process took all summer to complete. The last portion to come down was the center field bleachers and the "exploding" scoreboard. The site of the old park was turned into a parking lot to serve those attending games at the new Comiskey Park (later renamed U.S. Cellular Field, now Rate Field).

Comiskey Park depicted on a 1912 Sanborn map

At the time Comiskey was demolished, Chicago's two baseball stadiums were a combined 157 years old.

Bill Veeck once remarked that "There is no more beautiful sight in the world than a ballpark full of people!" On its best days, Comiskey was stuffed to the gills, with 55,000 people or more lining the aisles and even standing for 9 (or 18) innings on the sloping ramps that criss-crossed behind the scoreboard. The nearly-fully enclosed stands had a way of capturing and reverberating the noise without any artificial enhancement. Chicago sportswriter Alan Solomon remarked in 1988 that growing up in Chicago, "Wrigley Field yayed and Comiskey Park roared.

The location of Comiskey Park's home plate is marked with a marble plaque near the parking lot across the street from Rate Field; foul lines for the old park are painted on the lot's asphalt. Based on Google Maps measurements, the old home plate is 503 feet due north of the current home plate at Rate Field. Also, the spectator ramp across 35th Street is designed in such a way (partly curved, partly straight but angling east-northeast) that it echoes the outline of part of the old grandstand.

Shortly before the park's demolition, the ballpark was featured in the movie Only the Lonely. John Candy's character (on a first date) arranged to have a private picnic on the stadium grass under the lights with his date (Ally Sheedy). Candy made a reference of the stadium's impending demolition during the date.

When the Sox won the 2005 World Series, their victory parade began at U.S. Cellular Field, and then circled the block where old Comiskey had stood, before heading on a route through various south side neighborhoods and toward downtown Chicago.

== Nicholson home run ==
On May 6, 1964, White Sox outfielder Dave Nicholson hit a home run that either bounced atop the left-field roof or entirely cleared it. The home run was officially measured at 573 feet, and is one of baseball's all-time longest.

== No-hitters at Comiskey ==
A total of nine no-hitters were pitched at Comiskey Park; six by White Sox pitchers and three by pitchers of opposing teams.

Pitcher	Date	Winning team	Score	Losing team	Ref.
Ed Walsh	August 27, 1911	Chicago White Sox	5–0	Boston Red Sox	
Joe Benz	May 31, 1914	Chicago White Sox	6–1	Cleveland Naps	
Vern Kennedy	August 31, 1935	Chicago White Sox	5–0	Cleveland Indians	
Bill Dietrich	June 1, 1937	Chicago White Sox	8–0	St. Louis Browns	
Bob Feller	April 16, 1940	Cleveland Indians	1–0	Chicago White Sox	
Bob Keegan	August 20, 1957	Chicago White Sox	6–0	Washington Senators	
Bill Monbouquette	August 1, 1962	Boston Red Sox	1–0	Chicago White Sox	
Joe Horlen	September 10, 1967	Chicago White Sox	6–0	Detroit Tigers	
Jack Morris	April 7, 1984	Detroit Tigers	4–0	Chicago White Sox	

An unofficial no-hitter was pitched at Comiskey Park on July 1, 1990, when New York Yankees pitcher Andy Hawkins did not allow a hit for eight innings, but lost 4–0 to the White Sox. Games lost by the visiting team in 8 1/2 innings but without allowing any hits do not qualify as no-hitters, as the visiting team has only pitched eight innings.

== Notable concerts ==
Date	Artist	Opening act(s)	Tour / Concert name	Attendance	Revenue	Notes
August 20, 1965	The Beatles	King Curtis; Cannibal and the Headhunters; Brenda Holloway; Sounds Incorporated	1965 US tour	56,000	—	Two shows
July 10, 1976	Aerosmith	Jeff Beck; Stu Daye; Rick Derringer; Jan Hammer	Rocks Tour	—	—	
August 5, 1978	Aerosmith; Foreigner; AC/DC; Mahogany Rush; Walter Egan	—	Summer Jam	—	—	
August 19, 1978	The Eagles; Steve Miller Band; Pablo Cruise	—	Summer Jam	—	—	
August 5, 1979	Journey	Molly Hatchet; Eddie Money; Santana; Thin Lizzy	Evolution Tour	—	—	
August 18, 1979	Blondie	Beach Boys; Atlanta Rhythm Section; Sha Na Na	U.S. Tour '79	—	—	This show was part of Chicago Jam.
August 19, 1979	Rush	—	Permanent Waves Tour	—	—	This show was part of Chicago Jam 2 concert series.
July 23, 1983	The Police	Joan Jett & The Blackhearts; A Flock of Seagulls; The Fixx; Ministry	Synchronicity Tour	50,000	—	As soon as The Police hit the stage, they were covered in a swirl of red, yellow and blue smoke. The red, yellow and blue lighting scheme and video projections were used during the whole show.
July 24, 1983	Simon and Garfunkel	—	Summer Evening Tour	—	—	
October 12, 1984	The Jacksons	—	Victory Tour	120,000	—	Two shows were moved from Pittsburgh.
October 13, 1984	The Jacksons	—	Victory Tour	120,000	—	Two shows were moved from Pittsburgh.
October 14, 1984	The Jacksons	—	Victory Tour	120,000	—	Two shows were moved from Pittsburgh.

== Other events ==
=== Boxing ===
- On June 22, 1937, Comiskey Park was host to the James Braddock vs. Joe Louis heavyweight world title fight.
- On June 22, 1949, Ezzard Charles defeats Jersey Joe Walcott to win the vacant NBA heavyweight title.
- On September 25, 1962, Sonny Liston fought then world heavyweight champ Floyd Patterson.

=== Wrestling ===
- June 30, 1961, Buddy Rogers defeated Pat O'Connor to win the NWA World Heavyweight Championship. The attendance was 38,622.

=== Roller Derby ===
The all-time attendance record of 50,118 for any roller derby event was set on September 15, 1972 at an interleague match between the Los Angeles Thunderbirds of Roller Games (National Skating Derby) and the Midwest Pioneers of Roller Derby (International Roller Derby League). The banked track was placed around second base.

=== Soccer ===
- October 1, 1984, 8,352 attended the first game of Soccer Bowl '84.
- Comiskey Park was the host of the 1990 Marlboro Cup. Among the players participating were Enrique Díaz, Arnoldo Iguarán, Carlos Estrada, Daniel Pighín, Eric Wynalda, Juan Cayasso, Leszek Pisz, Luis Fajardo, Piotr Nowak, Roberto Siboldi, and Roman Kosecki.

Date	Team No. 1	Result	Team No. 2	Attendance	Round
May 4, 1990	Colombia	2–1	Poland		Semi-finals
May 4, 1990	(Mexico) Atlas	2–0	Costa Rica		Semi-finals
May 6, 1990	Poland	2–1	Costa Rica		Third place match
May 6, 1990	(Mexico) Atlas	0–0 (4–2 pen)	Colombia	8,783	Final

Events and tenants
Preceded by South Side Park	Home of the Chicago White Sox; 1910–1990	Succeeded by Comiskey Park II
Preceded by Normal Park; Normal Park; Wrigley Field	Home of the Chicago Cardinals; 1922–1925; 1929–1930; 1940–1959	Succeeded by Normal Park; Wrigley Field; Soldier Field
Preceded by First; Ebbets Field; Olympic Stadium	Host of the All-Star Game; 1933; 1950; 1983	Succeeded by Polo Grounds; Briggs Stadium; Candlestick Park
