= Blue with Lou =

Studio album by Nils Lofgren
- Released: April 26, 2019
- Recorded: 2017
- Studio: Studiocat Productions (Scottsdale, Arizona)
- Genre: Rock
- Length: 56:15
- Label: Cattle Track Road
- Producer: Nils Lofgren; Amy Lofgren

Nils Lofgren chronology
UK 2015 Face the Music Tour (2015)	Blue with Lou (2019)	Weathered (2020)

Blue with Lou is an album by Nils Lofgren, released on April 26, 2019, through Cattle Track Road Records. Lofgren co-wrote six of its tracks with Lou Reed in the 1970s, with Reed's death in 2013 being the catalyst for Lofgren to record the material at his home studio in 2017. The album received generally positive reviews from critics, who felt that the songs co-written by Reed were the strongest of the material.

== Critical reception ==
Professional ratings
Aggregate scores
Source	Rating
Metacritic	75/100
Review scores
Source	Rating
AllMusic	3.5/5 stars
American Songwriter	3.5/5 stars
PopMatters	8/10

Blue with Lou received a score of 75 out of 100 at review aggregator Metacritic based on seven critics' reviews, indicating "generally favorable" reception. Uncut remarked that "Lofgren's voice is crackly, but plays perfectly", and Classic Rock called it "a pleasant album and one that covers a lot of bases", while Mojo felt that "the Reed/Lofgren songs muscle their way to the top of the pile". Glide Magazine stated that "the 'less is more' premise remains in effect just often enough on Blue with Lou to certify the record, name associations aside, as a memorable entry in the lengthy discography of Nils Lofgren".

Stephen Thomas Erlewine of AllMusic wrote that "Lofgren achieves a lean, sinewy sound that gives the tight group plenty of room to roam" and while "Lofgren's originals may not carry the same swagger, [...] when they're surrounded by these Reed co-writes, they're given a slight lift: the whole affair simultaneously feels like an affectionate tribute to a departed friend and a resuscitation of Lofgren's gut-level rock & roll". PopMatters' staff opined that "Lofgren rises to the occasion, playing with a sense of abandon and danger that recalls his best work with Grin and blistering, if overlooked, live albums, including 1977's indispensable Night After Night". Hal Horowitz of American Songwriter noted that despite the passage of time since the material was written, "little has changed with [Lofgren's] youthful sounding voice, sizzling guitar playing, melodic songwriting or overall boyish enthusiasm. That makes this comeback of sorts particularly sweet, irrespective of Reed's beyond-the-grave involvement".

== Track listing ==
Blue with Lou track listing
No.	Title	Writer(s)	Length
1.	"Attitude City"	Nils Lofgren; Lou Reed	4:24
2.	"Give"	Lofgren; Reed	5:56
3.	"Talk Thru the Tears"	Lofgren; Reed	4:08
4.	"Pretty Soon"	Lofgren	3:49
5.	"Rock or Not"	Lofgren	3:31
6.	"City Lights"	Lofgren; Reed	4:15
7.	"Blue with Lou"	Lofgren	7:12
8.	"Don't Let Your Guard Down"	Lofgren; Reed	2:52
9.	"Too Blue to Play"	Lofgren	4:00
10.	"Cut Him Up"	Lofgren; Reed	6:08
11.	"Dear Heartbreaker"	Lofgren	5:02
12.	"Remember You"	Lofgren	4:58
Total length:			56:15

== Personnel ==
performer credits adapted from the liner notes

- Nils Lofgren – vocals, keyboards guitars, arrangements
- Kevin McCormack – bass, arrangements
- Andy Newmark – drums, arrangements

Additional musician

- Branford Marsalis – tenor saxophone (6)

Additional vocals

- Cindy Mizelle (1, 2, 5, 7, 8, 10–12)
- Josef Curtis (3, 6, 7, 9, 12)
- Toby Kidd (3, 6, 7, 9, 12)
- Kenny Miller (3, 6, 7, 9, 12)
- Jason Raetz (3, 6, 7, 9, 12)
- Gary Bruzzese (4, 5, 8)
- Greg Varlotta (4, 5, 8)
- John Willis (4, 5, 8)
- Amy Lofgren (5, 7)
- Elena Nikolov (5, 7)
- Lauren Wojcik (5, 7)
- Dylan Covington (7)
- Mark McDowell (7)
- Tyler Tse (7)

=== Production ===
- Nils Lofgren – executive producer, producer, sleeve notes
- Amy Lofgren – executive producer, producer
- Jamison Weddel – recording, mixing
- Bob Weber – studio assistant, music technician
- Ryan Billings – mastering
- Greg Lukens – mastering
- Studio L (Alexandria, Virginia) – mastering location
- Dick Bangham – package design
- Cristina Arrigoni – cover photography, black and white photography
- Dylan Covington – color photography
- Tom Goldfogle – management

== Charts ==
Chart performance for Blue with Lou
Chart (2019)	Peak position
Scottish Albums (OCC)	62
UK Independent Albums (OCC)	23
US Independent Albums (Billboard)	33
