= Back It Up =

Back It Up may refer to:

== Albums ==
- Back It Up!!, by Nils Lofgren, 1975
- Back It Up (Robin Trower album), 1983

== Songs ==
- "Back It Up" (Caro Emerald song), 2009
- "Back It Up" (Prince Royce song), 2015
- "Back It Up", by Colette Carr from Skitszo, 2013
- "Back It Up", by Exo from Reverxe, 2026
- "Back It Up", by Jewelry, 2011
- "Back It Up", by Seventeen from An Ode, 2019
- "Back It Up", by Swami, 2013
- "Back It Up", by Robin S., 1994

== See also ==
- Backing up or reversing, a vehicle maneuver
- Backup, in information technology
