= Grin (Grin album) =

Studio album by Grin
- Released: June 1971
- Recorded: 1969–1970
- Studio: Wally Heider Studios, San Francisco
- Genre: Rock
- Length: 41:42
- Label: Spindizzy; Epic (original LP & vinyl reissue), Acadia (SonyBMG) (2005 remastered CD reissue)
- Producer: David Briggs

Grin chronology
| Grin (1971) | 1+1 (1972) |

Professional ratings
Review scores
| Source | Rating |
|---|---|
| Christgau's Record Guide | B+ |
| Tom Hull – on the Web | B+ |

Grin is a 1971 album by the American rock band Grin, featuring songs by their guitarist Nils Lofgren. In the UK, it was released by CBS as part of a 1976 double album set along with its successor 1+1. In 2005, it was issued on CD in remastered form, with the addition of two more tracks from the original sessions. The album was dedicated to Roy Buchanan with "special thanks" to Neil Young and Crazy Horse.

== Track listing ==
All tracks composed by Nils Lofgren

1. "Like Rain" - 3:38
2. "See What a Love Can Do" - 5:02 (*) (Jerry Williams - scat vocals)
3. "Everybody's Missin' the Sun" - 2:44
4. "18 Faced Lover" - 3:26
5. "Outlaw" - 4:02 (*)
6. "We All Sung Together" - 3:44
7. "If I Were a Song" - 3:10
8. "Take You to the Movies Tonight" - 1:45
9. "Direction" - 4:14
10. "Pioneer Mary" - 3:45 (*)
11. "Open Wide" - 3:02
12. "I Had Too Much (Miss Dazi)" - 3:23

=== 2005 Sony CD bonus tracks ===
1. "Nobody" - 2:57
2. "Sing for Happiness" - 3:15 (**)

"Nobody" features the original lyrics prior to being re-written for Crazy Horse. Both "Nobody" and "Sing for Happiness" were previously released on The Very Best of Grin, Spindizzy/Epic Associated/Legacy 65697-SI.

== Cover versions ==
The live track labelled "Any Day Woman" recorded by Plainsong includes a version of "Take You to the Movies Tonight" after that Paul Siebel song.

== Personnel ==
Grin

- Nils Lofgren – vocals, guitars, keyboards
- Bob Berberich – drums, vocals
- Bob Gordon – bass, vocals

Additional musicians

- Danny Whitten, Neil Young and Ralph Molina – harmony vocals
- Jerry Williams – scat singing
- Ben Keith – steel guitar

Technical

- Bruce McCauley – cover artwork
