= Nils Lofgren (album) =

Studio album by Nils Lofgren
- Released: March 1975
- Recorded: 1974–1975
- Studio: Sound City, Los Angeles, CA
- Genre: Rock
- Length: 35:27
- Label: A&M; Rykodisc (1990 reissue); Hip-O Select (2007 reissue)
- Producer: David Briggs; Nils Lofgren

Nils Lofgren chronology
Nils Lofgren (1975)	Back It Up!! (1975)

Singles from Nils Lofgren
- 1. "I Don't Want to Know" Released: 1975 (UK only); 2. "Back It Up" Released: June 6, 1975

Professional ratings
Review scores
Source	Rating
AllMusic	4.5/5 stars
The Village Voice	B+

Nils Lofgren, also known as the "Fat Man Album", is a 1975 album by the American musician Nils Lofgren. It was his first solo album, following the breakup of his group, Grin.

The album was critically praised at the time of its release, most notably in a 1975 Rolling Stone review by Jon Landau. The 1983 Rolling Stone Record Guide said it was a "tour de force of unquenchable vitality and disarming subtlety." In 2007, nearly 32 years after the release of Nils Lofgren, the album was again praised by Rolling Stone in the "Fricke's Picks" column, where David Fricke said it was one of 1975's best albums. The album was on the Billboard 200 chart for nine weeks and peaked at number 141 on May 10, 1975.

In 2007, the album was re-mastered and rereleased by Hip-O Select.

The circus billboard that appears on the cover of this album also appears in an episode of The Monkees, "The Monkees at the Circus", season 1, episode 22.

== Track listing ==
All songs by Nils Lofgren except where noted.

1. "Be Good Tonight" – 0:50
2. "Back It Up" – 2:23
3. "One More Saturday Night" – 3:09
4. "If I Say It, It's So" – 3:00
5. "I Don't Want to Know" – 2:45
6. "Keith Don't Go (Ode to the Glimmer Twin)" – 4:23
7. "Can't Buy a Break" – 3:19
8. "Duty" – 2:57
9. "The Sun Hasn't Set on This Boy Yet" – 2:48
10. "Rock and Roll Crook" – 2:55
11. "Two by Two" – 3:07
12. "Goin' Back" (Gerry Goffin, Carole King) – 3:51

== Personnel ==
Musicians

- Nils Lofgren – lead vocals, backing vocals, acoustic piano, organ, acoustic guitars, electric guitars
- Wornell Jones – electric bass
- Aynsley Dunbar – drums
- Stu Gardner – backing vocals (2–4, 6)

Production

- Nils Lofgren – producer
- David Briggs – producer, engineer
- David DeVore – assistant engineer
- Gabby Garcia – assistant engineer
- Kendun Recorders (Burbank, California) – mastering location
- Roland Young – art direction
- Junie Osaki – design
- Ed Caraeff – photography
