= Gone Crazy (album) =

Studio album by Grin
- Released: October 1973
- Genre: Rock
- Length: 38:39
- Label: A&M
- Producer: David Briggs

Grin chronology
All Out (1973)	Gone Crazy (1973)

Professional ratings
Review scores
Source	Rating
Christgau's Record Guide	B−
The Rolling Stone Album Guide	3/5 stars

Gone Crazy is a 1973 album by Grin. It was the band's final album.

The original album was a gatefold. The outside front and back covers feature a colorful drawing, by Lanny Tupper, of animals, dishes, and musical instruments going crazy. A photo of Nils Lofgren doing a flip is also on the front cover. The inside cover has nineteen photos of the band, performing and hanging out with an old man, identified as Mr. Carter.

== Critical reception ==
The Rolling Stone Album Guide called the harder numbers "the toughest and most assured the band ever produced."

== Track listing ==
All tracks composed by Nils Lofgren

Side One:

1. "You're the Weight" - 5:11
2. "Boy and Girl" - 4:31
3. "What About Me" - 4:27
4. "One More Time" - 5:10

Side Two:

1. "True Thrill" - 3:08
2. "Beggar's Day (Eulogy to Danny Whitten)" - 4:18
3. "Nightmare" - 3:42
4. "Believe" - 3:55
5. "Ain't for Free" - 4:17

== Personnel ==
Grin

- Nils Lofgren - guitars, keyboards, lead vocals
- Bob Berberich - drums, lead vocals
- Bob Gordon - bass, backing vocals
- Tom Lofgren - guitars, backing vocals

== Etc. ==
These liner notes are written in script around the photograph and are hard to read, so some spelling may be wrong.

- For their invaluable assistance on and off the road, thanks to our friends Jimmy Foster, Tom Miller and John Lockbridge.
- Special thanks to Clydie M. King, Sherlie Matthews and Merry Clayton for behind vocals.
- For all artwork, cover & back, thanks to Lonnie Tupper (Lanny Tupper) for his talents & interest above and beyond the call of duty.
- Management - "Smart" Art Linson.
- Photography Connie Sprague (cover photo) & R. Ottinger.
- Engineered by David Briggs w/ Bob, Bill & Gabby
- Recorded at Bias.
- We are deeply grateful to Bobbye Hall for all her percussion work.
