= Silver Lining (Nils Lofgren album) =

Studio album by Nils Lofgren
- Released: 1991
- Studios: Ocean Way (Hollywood, California); Groove Masters (Santa Monica, California); Secret Sound (New York City, New York)
- Genre: Rock
- Length: 49:15
- Label: Rykodisc
- Producers: Kevin McCormick; Nils Lofgren

Nils Lofgren chronology
Code of the Road (1986)	Silver Lining (1991)	Crooked Line (1992)

Silver Lining is an album by the American musician Nils Lofgren, released in 1991.

The album peaked at No. 153 on the Billboard 200. "Valentine", featuring harmony vocals by Bruce Springsteen, was the album's first single.

== Production ==
The album was produced by Kevin McCormick and Lofgren. It was recorded at Ocean Way Studios, in Los Angeles. Lofgren chose to add elements of soul and blues to his rock sound. Ringo Starr played drums on "Walkin' Nerve". Billy Preston and Clarence Clemons also contributed to Silver Lining.

== Critical reception ==
Professional ratings
Review scores
Source	Rating
AllMusic	4/5 stars
Robert Christgau	(dud)
The Encyclopedia of Popular Music	3/5 stars
MusicHound Rock: The Essential Album Guide	3.5/5 stars
The Rolling Stone Album Guide	3/5 stars
Windsor Star	A

Entertainment Weekly wrote: "A few tracks are little more than well-worn white R&B riffs with throwaway lyrics. But after years of second-banana status and flop albums that would demoralize the best of us, Lofgren displays a feisty exuberance on Silver Lining that's close to inspirational." The Windsor Star thought that "each cut here is a carefully thought-out rock statement, marvellously melodic, and exciting."

The Ottawa Citizen determined that the album "has a strong blues influence interwoven with Lofgren's biting, melodic rock... Graceful passages give way to hard-edged guitar, often within the same song." The Chicago Tribune deemed it "another characteristically smooth yet energetic set of solid rock."

AllMusic wrote that, "although Lofgren is a rocker first and foremost, he is hardly oblivious to soul music and the blues."

== Track listing ==
All tracks are written by Nils Lofgren.

No.	Title	Length
1.	"Silver Lining"	4:45
2.	"Valentine"	6:14
3.	"Walkin' Nerve"	3:53
4.	"Live Each Day"	4:00
5.	"Sticks and Stones"	6:10
6.	"Trouble's Back"	5:24
7.	"Little Bit o' Time"	2:48
8.	"Bein' Angry"	5:52
9.	"Gun and Run"	4:18
10.	"Girl in Motion"	5:51
Total length:		49:15

== Personnel ==
- Nils Lofgren – vocals, guitars
- Billy Preston – organ (1, 8), keyboards (6)
- Scott Thurston – keyboards (2, 4, 5, 7)
- Kevin Russell – guitars (6)
- Kevin McCormick – bass (1, 3, 7, 9), keyboards (2), fretless bass (2, 4, 5, 8, 10), percussion (2), lap steel guitar (5), Clevinger bass (5), tambourine (7)
- Paul "Polo" Jones – bass (6)
- Andy Newmark – drums (1, 2, 4, 5, 7–10)
- Ringo Starr – drums (3), vocals (8)
- Gigi Gonaway – drums (6)
- Levon Helm – harmonica (1, 6, 9), vocals (1, 6, 9)
- Clarence Clemons – saxophone (6)
- Bruce Springsteen – vocals (2)

Production

- Nils Lofgren – producer
- Kevin McCormick – producer, mixing
- Shep Lonsdale – recording, mixing
- Chas Sanford – engineer (6)
- Elliot Solomon – engineer (6)
- Dan Bosworth – recording assistant
- Paul Dieter – additional recording
- Toby Mountain – digital mastering
- Larry Cragg – guitar production, all other photography
- Steven Jurgensmeyer – package design
- Alison Reynolds – cover photography

== Charts ==
Chart performance for Silver Lining
Chart (1991)	Peak position
Dutch Albums (Album Top 100)	62
UK Albums (Official Charts)	61
US Billboard 200	153
