= Cry Tough (Nils Lofgren album) =

Studio album by Nils Lofgren
- Released: 1976
- Recorded: 1976
- Studios: Record Plant (Sausalito, California); Record Plant (Los Angeles, California); Bias (Falls Church, Virginia)
- Genre: Rock
- Length: 37:14
- Label: A&M
- Producers: David Briggs; Al Kooper

Nils Lofgren chronology
Back It Up!! (1975)	Cry Tough (1976)	I Came to Dance (1977)

Singles from Cry Tough
- 1. "Cry Tough" Released: April 1976; 2. "It's Not a Crime" Released: September 1976

Professional ratings
Review scores
Source	Rating
AllMusic	3.5/5 stars
The Village Voice	B−

Cry Tough is a 1976 album from Nils Lofgren. The follow-up to his solo debut, Cry Tough is another offering of Lofgren-penned pop/rock. Notable for the title track and the songs "It's Not a Crime", "Mud In Your Eye" and "Can't Get Closer", "Cry Tough" also includes Al Kooper on keyboards.

The album charted on the US Billboard 200 for sixteen weeks and peaked at number 32 on June 5, 1976. On the UK albums chart, it peaked at number 8. No singles from the album charted in either country.

== Track listing ==
All songs written by Nils Lofgren, except where noted.

1. "Cry Tough" (Alton Ellis, E. Gordon, Winston Jarrett, Lofgren) – 5:07
2. "It's Not a Crime" (Lofgren, Tom Lofgren) – 4:14
3. "Incidentally It's Over" – 3:18
4. "For Your Love" (Graham Gouldman) – 5:21
5. "Share a Little" – 5:16
6. "Mud in Your Eye" – 2:42
7. "Can't Get Closer" – 3:45
8. "You Lit a Fire" – 3:18
9. "Jailbait" – 3:55

== Personnel ==
Musicians

- Nils Lofgren – vocals, guitars, backing vocals (2, 3, 5–7), acoustic piano (3, 6–8), synthesizers (5), organ (9), clavinet (9)
- Al Kooper – keyboards (1, 2), synthesizers (2), orchestral arrangements (2, 8), organ (4), acoustic piano (8), organ (9), clavinet (9)
- Tom Lofgren – guitars (1, 2, 4)
- Chuck Rainey – bass (1, 4, 8)
- Paul Stallworth – bass (2, 4, 9)
- Wornell Jones – bass (3, 5, 7)
- Scott Ball – upright bass (6)
- Jim Gordon – drums (1, 2, 4, 8, 9)
- Aynsley Dunbar – drums (3, 5, 7)
- Emil Richards – percussion (1, 2, 8)
- Holden Raphael – percussion (6)
- Dominic Frontiere – orchestral arrangements (2, 8)
- Ron Hicklin Singers – backing vocals (1, 2, 8, 9)
- P.P. Arnold – backing vocals (2)
- Claudia Lennear – backing vocals (2)
- Buddy Miles – backing vocals (2)
- Ralph Molina – backing vocals (3, 5)
- Billy Talbot – backing vocals (3, 5)

Production

- Al Kooper – producer (1, 2, 4, 8, 9)
- David Briggs – producer (3, 5–7)
- Bob Dawson – engineer
- David DeVore – engineer
- Bob Edwards – engineer
- Lee Kiefer – engineer
- Tim Mulligan – engineer
- Chip Brown – assistant engineer
- John Henning – assistant engineer
- Deni King – assistant engineer
- Chris Morris – assistant engineer
- Ed Caraeff – design, photography
- Tom Nikosey – letterforms

== Charts ==
Chart performance for Cry Tough
Chart (1976)	Peak position
Australian Albums (Kent Music Report)	96
Canada Top Albums/CDs (RPM)	57
Dutch Albums (Album Top 100)	12
Swedish Albums (Sverigetopplistan)	22
UK Albums (Official Charts)	8
US Billboard 200	32
