= Night Fades Away =

Studio album by Nils Lofgren
- Released: September 30, 1981
- Studio: Cherokee (Hollywood, California)
- Genre: Rock
- Length: 38:25
- Label: Backstreet; MCA
- Producer: Jeffrey Baxter

Nils Lofgren chronology
Nils (1979)	Night Fades Away (1981)	Best of Nils Lofgren (1981)

Night Fades Away is the fifth solo studio album by Nils Lofgren, released in September 1981 through Backstreet and MCA Records. It was produced by Jeffrey Baxter and reached the top 50 in Sweden and the UK, also charting in the top 100 in Australia and the US.

== Critical reception ==
Professional ratings
Review scores
Source	Rating
AllMusic	2/5 stars
Record Mirror	2/5 stars
The Rolling Stone Album Guide	2/5 stars

The Boston Globe wrote that "the high voice is familiar and warming, the themes are familiar and cogent, the guitar playing is familiar, fluid and tasteful, but the songwriting is not up to [Lofgren's] early, wondrous standard."

Joe Vigilone of AllMusic wrote that "the LP is more about exploring styles and experimenting than a fully realized musical statement" and "Nils' disheveled five o'clock shadow and torn, stained shirt on the front and back covers give a glimpse of the musical image", finding that "the best moments here are the covers" of Del Shannon's "I Go to Pieces" and the Beatles' "Any Time at All". Vigilone concluded that "the material and production keep Night Fades Away in the shadows, a dilemma for an artist as creative as Nils Lofgren. If only the music inside were as ragged as the cover photo of a star as enigmatic as he is handsome."

== Track listing ==
Side one
No.	Title	Writer(s)	Length
1.	"Night Fades Away"	Nils Lofgren	4:23
2.	"I Go to Pieces"	Del Shannon	2:52
3.	"Empty Heart"	Lofgren	4:37
4.	"Don't Touch Me"	Lofgren	3:51
5.	"Dirty Money"	Lofgren	3:56

Side two
No.	Title	Writer(s)	Length
6.	"Sailor Boy"	Lofgren	3:53
7.	"Anytime at All"	John Lennon, Paul McCartney	2:51
8.	"Ancient History"	Lofgren	4:49
9.	"Streets Again"	Lofgren, Jeff Baxter	3:59
10.	"In Motion"	Lofgren, Baxter	3:14
Total length:			38:25

== Personnel ==
- Nils Lofgren – vocals, synthesizers, accordion, guitars
- Nicky Hopkins – Fender Rhodes (1), acoustic piano (9), tack piano (9)
- Greg Mathieson – Fender Rhodes (2, 6, 7)
- Jeff Baxter – guitars, guitar synthesizer
- Trevor Veitch – acoustic guitar (2, 7)
- Elliott Randall – electric guitar (2, 6, 7)
- Neil Jason – bass (1, 3-5, 8-10)
- David Hungate – bass (2)
- Neil Stubenhaus – bass (6, 7)
- Ed Greene – drums (1, 2, 4, 8)
- Richie Hayward – drums (3, 5, 9, 10)
- Jeff Porcaro – drums (6, 7)
- Jerry Peterson – saxophone (4)
- Chuck Findley – trumpet (10)
- Larold Rebhun – special arrangement (5)
- Del Shannon – vocals (2)
- The Fabulous Robbs (Dee Robb) – backing vocals (5)
- The "Mighty Clouds of Los Scumbos" – backing vocals (5)
- Ellen Snortland – backing vocals (9)

Production

- Jeff Baxter – producer, overdub recording, mixing
- Dee Robb – recording
- Larold Rebhun – overdub recording, mixing
- Steve Fontana – assistant engineer
- Dave Mancini – assistant engineer
- Krohn McHenry – assistant engineer
- Stephen Marcussen – mastering at Precision Lacquer (Hollywood, California)
- Jean-Luc Dub – production assistant
- Shari Dub – production assistant
- Djb Barnao – art direction
- George Osaki – design
- Annie Leibovitz – photography

== Charts ==
Chart performance for Night Fades Away
Chart (1981)	Peak position
Australian Albums (Kent Music Report)	92
Swedish Albums (Sverigetopplistan)	22
UK Albums (OCC)	50
US Billboard 200	99
