= Muscle of Love =

Studio album by Alice Cooper
- Released: November 20, 1973
- Recorded: 1973
- Studios: Sunset Sound, Hollywood; Record Plant, New York and The Cooper Mansion, Greenwich, Connecticut
- Genres: Hard rock; glam rock; garage rock
- Length: 39:31
- Label: Warner Bros.
- Producers: Jack Richardson, Jack Douglas

Alice Cooper chronology
School Days: The Early Recordings (1973)	Muscle of Love (1973)	Greatest Hits (1974)

Singles from Muscle of Love
- 1. "Teenage Lament '74" Released: November 28, 1973; 2. "Muscle of Love" Released: January 25, 1974

Muscle of Love is the seventh studio album by American rock band Alice Cooper. The album was released in late 1973, with the band playing its last concert a few months later. It was the final studio album released by Alice Cooper as a band for 52 years, until the release of their reunion album The Revenge of Alice Cooper (2025).

== Background ==
Cooper stated in an interview at the time of recording that the album marked a return to a basic rock sound. "It's not complicated in any sense and there's not a lot of theatricality on it. It's very basic rock and roll throughout." Cooper further explained, "Billion Dollar Babies was a studio effort all the way. So was School's Out. It was just so clean that after a few times of hearing it myself, it had no mystery to it. I really wanted this one to have more guts to it. More balls."

Muscle of Love is the first Alice Cooper album without Bob Ezrin as producer since the pre-stardom Easy Action. The explanation given at the time was that Ezrin was recovering from illness. However, bassist Dennis Dunaway revealed in a 2011 interview that the band split with the producer during an acrimonious rehearsal in which guitarist Michael Bruce stood up to Ezrin and refused to change the arrangement of "Woman Machine". Jack Richardson and Jack Douglas stepped in to share co-production duties. Author Bob Greene described his participation in the album's recording sessions, and his experiences touring with the band, in his 1974 book Billion Dollar Baby.

Dunaway recalled the album sessions as being very difficult. "The problems on that album were that we could tell that everything was being pulled out from underneath us. As hard as we tried to get it back to where it once was, we had that sinking feeling going on. We wanted to rekindle what the band was about but there was just too much exhaustion by then."

== Lyrical content ==
In a contemporary interview with Circus magazine, Cooper said that a loose concept of "urban sex habits" developed during the album's recording. The title of "Big Apple Dreamin' (Hippo)' refers to the Hippopotamus club of New York City which the band used to frequent. "Never Been Sold Before" is the retort of a prostitute to the man she is supporting, and the title track is, according to Cooper, about "sexual awakenings". "It's about the kid who just learned how to masturbate, and what all those dirty books his father used to hide are all about." "Woman Machine" is a science fiction-themed song dating back to the band's early years and is, as Cooper explained, "basically a chauvinistic song. It's about a female robot, like Julie Newmar was on that TV program with Bob Cummings. If we had women robots, they could do anything, even sexual things, just by changing their tubes."

Not all of the songs have a sexual theme; "Crazy Little Child" tells the story of a youth criminal, and in "Teenage Lament '74", a teenager fails to find happiness even when doing everything to try to be "hip". "Man With the Golden Gun" was written with the intention of having it appear on the soundtrack of the then-upcoming James Bond film of the same name. Cooper recalled in a 2011 interview:

It was supposed to be the Bond theme, but it actually came in a day too late, and by the time they heard it, they'd already signed for Lulu's song. I went, "You're gonna take Lulu over this?" [Laughs.] 'Cause it was perfect for The Man With The Golden Gun. It had helicopters, it had machine guns—it had the Pointer Sisters, Ronnie Spector, and Liza Minnelli doing background vocals! We went to every single one of those John Barry albums to try and invent the perfect James Bond song, and even Christopher Lee, who played Scaramanga in the movie, said, "Oh, man, why did we take the Lulu song? This song is the one!" [Laughs.] So, yeah, we lost out on that one, but I still put it on the album. I said, "I don't care, I'm going to do a James Bond track no matter what."

== Personnel disputes ==
Though credited as lead guitarist on Muscle of Love, Glen Buxton was "not invited" to play on the album according to drummer Neal Smith, Cooper, and others. His inclusion in the liner notes was mainly due to management's concerns about the band's image with fans, and the fact that Buxton co-composed four of the album's songs. Smith stated the absence was due to "problems that Glen was having with the demons of rock and roll at that particular time ... really, Billion Dollar Babies and Muscle of Love, Glen didn't really play on the (latter) album. By hook or by crook, the albums had to be put out." The band sought out other guitar players to fill in, including Dick Wagner, Steve Hunter, and fellow Cortez High School alum Mick Mashbir.

There is an additional suggestion that a session drummer was used on part of the album. Band member Michael Bruce refers, in his autobiography, to producer Jack Douglas bringing in a drummer specifically to play on "Crazy Little Child". This report is given some added support by the claims of session drummer Allan Schwartzberg, who says he played on several tracks.

== Packaging ==
In place of the usual record jacket, the original LP was packaged in a shallow corrugated cardboard carton, with a "stain" intentionally printed along the bottom. On the inner sleeve, the band members appear dressed as sailors. In the "before" daytime shot, they are about to enter a nude wrestling emporium; in the "after" nighttime shot on the other side of the sleeve, they appear beaten and sprawled out on the street, having been thrown out of the club, the joke being that the live nude female wrestler was a gorilla with a blonde wig. The front of the album cover design agency Pacific Eye & Ear was temporarily redecorated to serve as the setting for the photo session.

The original release also included a paper "book cover" sheet that could be folded and used as a book jacket. A photo on the sheet depicts the band members in their sailor uniforms looking dejected while peeling potatoes.

== Reception and chart performance ==
Professional ratings
Review scores
Source	Rating
Allmusic	link
Christgau's Record Guide	C

Muscle of Love received an uneven reception from critics. Writing in Rolling Stone, Lenny Kaye gave the album a mixed review, describing its content as "hit-or-miss" and believing that the group had lost focus with regard to its musical direction. Phonographic Record published a negative review and suggested that the group had been unable to overcome the loss of Ezrin. Creem, however, gave the album a positive review, calling it "a magnificent effort".

Although Muscle of Love went to No. 10 on the Billboard 200 and earned a gold certification, it was considered something of a commercial disappointment in light of its predecessor Billion Dollar Babies having reached No. 1 and attaining platinum.

Muscle of Love's songs have been rarities at Alice Cooper's subsequent concerts: apart from the title track (performed erratically in 1989, 1997 and since 2004) plus four performances of "Teenage Lament '74" in 1996 and 2004, nothing from Muscle of Love has been performed since 1974. "Never Been Sold Before", "Crazy Little Child", "Man with the Golden Gun" and "Woman Machine" have never been performed live.

== Covers ==
The song "Muscle of Love" was covered by Fireball Ministry for their 2001 FMEP release. "Teenage Lament '74" was covered by Big Country on their 2001 covers album Under Cover, and by Tyla on the 1993 Various Artists tribute album Welcome to Our Nightmare. "Hard Hearted Alice" was covered by Chris Connelly on the Mutations: A Tribute to Alice Cooper compilation.

== Track listing ==
Side one
No.	Title	Writer(s)	Length
1.	"Big Apple Dreamin' (Hippo)"	Alice Cooper, Glen Buxton, Michael Bruce, Dennis Dunaway, Neal Smith	5:10
2.	"Never Been Sold Before"	Cooper, Buxton, Bruce, Dunaway, Smith	4:28
3.	"Hard Hearted Alice"	Cooper, Bruce	4:53
4.	"Crazy Little Child"	Cooper, Bruce	5:03

Side two
No.	Title	Writer(s)	Length
1.	"Working Up a Sweat"	Cooper, Bruce	3:32
2.	"Muscle of Love"	Cooper, Bruce	3:45
3.	"Man with the Golden Gun"	Cooper, Buxton, Bruce, Dunaway, Smith	4:12
4.	"Teenage Lament '74"	Cooper, Smith	3:54
5.	"Woman Machine"	Cooper, Buxton, Bruce, Dunaway, Smith	4:31

== Personnel ==
Alice Cooper band

- Alice Cooper – vocals
- Glen Buxton – lead guitar (credited, but does not appear)
- Michael Bruce – rhythm guitar, backing vocals
- Dennis Dunaway – bass guitar, backing vocals
- Neal Smith – drums, backing vocals

with:

- Mick Mashbir – guitar
- Dick Wagner – guitar
- Bob Dolin – keyboards, background vocals
- Stanley Behrens – harmonica

Additional musicians from the LP liner notes:

- Paul Prestopino – banjo
- Dave Libert with Dolly, Stu Daye, Dennis Ferrante, Joe Gannon, The Big Cheese, Liza Minnelli, Labelle, Ronnie Spector, The Pointer Sisters and Janice Buxton - background vocals
- unnamed strings and horns

== Charts ==
Chart (1973–1974)	Peak position
Australian Albums (Kent Music Report)	36
Canada Top Albums/CDs (RPM)	4
Finnish Albums (The Official Finnish Charts)	13
US Billboard 200	10
UK Albums (Official Charts)	34

== Certifications ==
Region	Certification	Certified units/sales
United States (RIAA)	Gold	500,000^{^}
^{^} Shipments figures based on certification alone.
