= I Came to Dance =

Studio album by Nils Lofgren
- Released: March 1977
- Studios: Bias (Springfield, Virginia); Minot Sound (White Plains, New York); Secret Sound (New York City, New York)
- Genre: Rock
- Length: 36:04
- Label: A&M
- Producers: Nils Lofgren; Andy Newmark

Nils Lofgren chronology
Cry Tough (1976)	I Came to Dance (1977)	Night After Night (1977)

Professional ratings
Review scores
Source	Rating
AllMusic	2/5 stars
Christgau's Record Guide	C
MusicHound Rock: The Essential Album Guide	1/5 stars
The Rolling Stone Album Guide	2/5 stars

I Came to Dance is the third solo studio album by the American musician Nils Lofgren, released in 1977. It was produced by Lofgren and Andy Newmark.

== Track listing ==
All tracks composed by Nils Lofgren; except where indicated

1. "I Came to Dance" – 4:30
2. "Rock Me at Home" – 4:30
3. "Home Is Where the Hurt Is" – 4:12
4. "Code of the Road" – 4:51
5. "Happy Ending Kids" – 3:01
6. "Goin' South" – 4:03
7. "To Be a Dreamer" – 3:45
8. "Jealous Gun" – 3:50
9. "Happy" (Mick Jagger, Keith Richards) – 3:22

== Personnel ==
- Nils Lofgren – vocals, lead guitars
- Rev. Patrick Henderson – acoustic piano
- Tom Lofgren – rhythm guitars
- Tom Miller – acoustic guitar (3, 7)
- Wornell Jones – bass
- Andy Newmark – drums
- Rubens Bassini – congas (1), percussion (1)
- Mike Mainieri – vibraphone (4–6)
- Hugh McCracken – harmonica (9)
- William Eaton – horn and string arrangements, backing vocals (1–3, 7), BGV arrangements (1–3, 7)
- Patti Austin – backing vocals (1–3, 7)
- Frank Floyd – backing vocals (1–3, 7)
- Lani Groves – backing vocals (1–3, 7)
- Ullanda McCullough – backing vocals (1–3, 7)
- Zachary Sanders – backing vocals (1–3, 7)
- Anthony Hinton – backing vocals (4–6, 8, 9)
- Theresa V. Reed – backing vocals (4–6, 8, 9)
- Diane Sumler – backing vocals (4–6, 8, 9)
- Luther Vandross – backing vocals (4–6, 8, 9), BGV arrangements (4–6, 8, 9)
- Christine Wiltshire – backing vocals (4–6, 8, 9)

Production

- Nils Lofgren – producer
- Andy Newmark – producer
- Randy Adler – engineer
- Bob Dawson – engineer
- Jack Malken – engineer
- Ted Jensen – mastering at Sterling Sound (New York, NY)
- Ed Caraeff – art direction, photography
- Junie Osaki – design

== Charts ==
Chart performance for I Came to Dance
Chart (1977)	Peak position
Canada Top Albums/CDs (RPM)	81
Swedish Albums (Sverigetopplistan)	14
UK Albums (Official Charts)	30
US Billboard 200	36
