= All Out (album) =

Studio album by Grin
- Released: February 1973
- Recorded: 1972
- Genre: Rock
- Length: 32:48
- Label: Spindizzy; Columbia; Epic
- Producer: David Briggs

Grin chronology
1+1 (1972)	All Out (1973)	Gone Crazy (1973)

Professional ratings
Review scores
Source	Rating
Christgau's Record Guide	A−
Tom Hull – on the Web	A−

All Out is a 1973 album by Grin.

Where the first two Grin albums had featured the band as trio augmented by overdubs, singalong choirs or even orchestras, the recent addition of Nils' brother Tom as second guitarist made the band a solid quartet. The only additional performer is blues-shouter Kathi McDonald, who contributes backing vocals on several songs [most notably "Heart on Fire" and "She Ain't Right"].

Nils' liner notes in The Very Best of Grin attribute the "classy" solo in "Sad Letter" to Tom. "She Ain't Right" is also notable as the only Grin tune not attributed to Nils alone, but co-written with bassist Bob Gordon.

All Out was re-released on CD in 2009 with the single version of "Love Or Else" added as bonus track.

== LP cover and CD version ==
The title of the album does not appear on the outside cover. The mouth on the front cover is a flap which, when raised, reveals an open mouth with the words "ALL OUT" inside. The back cover features a photo of Nils with a thought bubble drawn in containing the track listing. The inside sleeve has a color photo of the band standing in a field on one side, and the lyrics on the other side.

For the CD release, the booklet simply has the closed mouth on the front and the open mouth on the back. The thought-bubble-and-Nils image appears on the back insert, along with other credits. There is no inside artwork.

== Track listing ==
1. "Sad Letter" - 3:10
2. "Heavy Chevy" - 3:34
3. "Don't Be Long" - 2:17
4. "Love Again" - 4:05
5. "She Ain't Right" - 3:27
6. "Love or Else" - 3:40
7. "Ain't Love Nice" - 2:07
8. "Heart on Fire" - 5:00
9. "All Out" - 3:04
10. "Rusty Gun" - 2:24
11. "Love or Else" (single version) (2009 CD only)

== Personnel ==
Grin

- Nils Lofgren - guitars, keyboards, accordion on "Rusty Gun", lead vocals
- Bob Berberich - drums, lead vocals
- Bob Gordon - bass, backing vocals
- Tom Lofgren - guitars, backing vocals

Special thanks to:

- Kathi McDonald [misspelled as "Kathy McDonald"] - vocals

Technical

- Art Direction/Design - Anthony Hudson
- Air Brush - Charlie Wild
- Photography - Joel Bernstein
- Produced by David Briggs
- Distributed by CBS Records

== Releases ==
- LP All Out Spindizzy Records 1972
- CD All Out Sony Music Distribution 2001
- CD All Out [Bonus Track] American Beat Records 2009
