= Nils (album) =

Studio album by Nils Lofgren
- Released: June 1979
- Studio: Power Station and Madison Square Garden (New York City, New York); Filmways/Heider Recording Studios (Hollywood, California); Soundstage, Toronto (Toronto, Ontario, Canada); Utopia Studios (London, UK)
- Genre: Rock
- Length: 39:11
- Label: A&M
- Producer: Bob Ezrin

Nils Lofgren chronology
Night After Night (1977)	Nils (1979)	Night Fades Away (1981)

Professional ratings
Review scores
Source	Rating
AllMusic	2.5/5 stars
Christgau's Record Guide	C+
Music Week	4/4 stars
The Rolling Stone Album Guide	3/5 stars

Nils is the fourth solo studio album by Nils Lofgren, released in June 1979 by A&M Records.

== Background ==
With mainstream success continuing to elude Lofgren, A&M brought in Bob Ezrin in 1979, to oversee Nils. Ezrin was known for his successes with Alice Cooper, Pink Floyd, Lou Reed, and Kiss. Lofgren: "The label said they wanted to bring in co-writers, and I said that I didn't do that. Ezrin said, 'What about Lou Reed?' And I said, 'Well, yeah, okay. That would be cool.'" Lofgren watched a football game at Reed's Greenwich Village apartment and the two struck up a friendship. In the middle of the night Reed would call Lofgren and dictate lyrics over the phone. Their collaborations appeared across Nils and Reed's The Bells, also released in 1979. Ezrin also brought in contributions from Dick Wagner, who'd worked with Reed, Kiss, and Cooper ("Only Women Bleed" and "You And Me"). Wagner and Reed co-wrote "I'll Cry Tomorrow" a sequel of sorts to "I Never Cry" (1976) by Wagner and Cooper. With such hit makers at his side, Lofgren felt certain that Nils would be his breakthrough and that songs like "Shine Silently" would be hits.

== Reception ==
Before performing an extended version of "Shine Silently" on Dutch TV show 2 Meter Session Lofgren noted that it was a personal favorite and the single a moderate hit in Holland.

== Track listing ==
All tracks composed by Nils Lofgren, except where indicated.

1. "No Mercy" – 4:06
2. "I'll Cry Tomorrow" (Dick Wagner, Lou Reed) – 4:28
3. "Baltimore" (Randy Newman) – 6:43
4. "Shine Silently" (Lofgren, Dick Wagner) – 3:48
5. "Steal Away" – 4:08
6. "Kool Skool" – 3:17
7. "A Fool Like Me" (Lofgren, Lou Reed) – 3:11
8. "I Found Her" (Lofgren, Lou Reed) – 3:36
9. "You're So Easy" (Lofgren, Bob Ezrin, Dick Wagner) – 5:54

== Personnel ==
- Nils Lofgren – lead vocals, accordion, lead guitar, rhythm guitar
- Bob Ezrin – keyboards, percussion, vibraphone, vocals
- Doug Riley – organ (3)
- Tom Lofgren – guitars, vocals
- Stu Daye – guitars, vocals
- Bob Babbitt – basses
- Allan Schwartzberg – drums
- Jody Linscott – percussion, congas
- David Sanborn – saxophone (7)
- Allan Macmillan – orchestration (4)
- Debbie Fleming – additional backing vocals
- Colina Phillips – additional backing vocals

=== Production ===
- Bob Ezrin – producer
- Brian Christian – co-producer, engineer
- Jim Frank – assistant engineer
- David Goetz – assistant engineer
- Geoff Hendrickson – assistant engineer
- Ringo Hyrcyna – assistant engineer
- Damian Korner – assistant engineer
- Bob Ludwig – mastering at Masterdisk (New York, NY)
- Ann Martin – production coordination
- Inez Fridenberg – production assistant
- George Minnis – production assistant
- Ilona Pring – production assistant
- T. Lawless – production assistant
- Gary Nichamin – album design
- Len Irish – photography

Special effects on "No Mercy" recorded at Madison Square Garden

== Charts ==
Chart performance for Nils
Chart (1979)	Peak position
Australian Albums (Kent Music Report)	96
Dutch Albums (Album Top 100)	50
German Albums (Offizielle Top 100)	21
Swedish Albums (Sverigetopplistan)	35
US Billboard 200	54
