= Crooked Line =

Studio album by Nils Lofgren
- Released: 1992
- Studio: Big Mo and Omega (Kensington, Maryland); Redwood Digital (Redwood City, California)
- Genre: Rock
- Length: 55:05
- Label: Rykodisc
- Producer: Eric Ambel

Nils Lofgren chronology
Silver Lining (1991)	Crooked Line (1992)	Live on the Test (1993)

Crooked Line is an album by the American musician Nils Lofgren, released in 1992. It was his second album for Rykodisc. The cover art is by Ralph Steadman.

== Production ==
For the most part recorded live in the studio, the album was produced by Eric Ambel. Johnny "Bee" Badanjek played drums on Crooked Line. Neil Young contributed to three of the tracks. Jason & the Scorchers' Andy York played bass. "Just a Little" is a cover of the Beau Brummels song, which Lofgren had performed as part of Ringo Starr's All-Starr tour; the song was the album's first single. The lyrics to many songs engage with social issues.

== Critical reception ==
Professional ratings
Review scores
Source	Rating
AllMusic	3/5 stars
Boston Herald	B+
Calgary Herald	C+
The Encyclopedia of Popular Music	2/5 stars
MusicHound Rock: The Essential Album Guide	3.5/5 stars
The State	4.5/5 stars
Toronto Sun	3/5 stars

The Boston Globe deemed the album "a touchingly personal, commerce-be-damned, low-key masterpiece," writing that "many songs also have a loose, easy feel." The Calgary Herald labeled it "competent enough, if a tad predictable ... Lofgren's been the bridesmaid of rock since 1971, and that's not going to change." Stereo Review determined that Crooked Line is "another album full of guitar doodling and good intentions [that] never quite hitting the mark with the sort of sharp, power-pop material Lofgren turned out with such accomplished ease way back when."

The Austin American-Statesman noted that it boasted "some of his hardest rock and his best band to date." The Kitchener-Waterloo Record opined that "most of this collection is solid rock hopefulness." The Toronto Sun labeled "Drunken Driver" "as scary and disturbing a song as you're likely to hear all year." The State concluded that "the real strengths lie in the meaty material and the bare-bones production and chunky rhythm guitar work of Eric Ambel." The San Antonio Express-News listed the album as the 10th best of 1992.

== Track listing ==
All tracks are written by Nils Lofgren, except where noted.

Crooked Line track listing
No.	Title	Writer(s)	Length
1.	"A Child Could Tell"		4:20
2.	"Blue Skies"		3:58
3.	"Misery"		6:45
4.	"You"		3:30
5.	"Shot at You"		5:47
6.	"Crooked Line"		4:54
7.	"Walk on Me"		4:05
8.	"Someday"		5:30
9.	"New Kind of Freedom"		3:40
10.	"Just a Little"	Robert Durand, Ron Elliott	3:22
11.	"Drunken Driver"		6:27
12.	"I'll Fight for You"		2:47
Total length:			55:05

== Personnel ==
The band

- Nils Lofgren – lead vocals, keyboards, accordion, guitars, harmonica, vibraphone
- Andy York – keyboards, bass guitar, percussion, harmony vocals
- Eric Ambel – guitars, timpani, harmony vocals
- Johnny "Bee" Badanjek – drums (1, 2, 4, 5, 7–9, 11, 12)

Guest musicians

- Neil Young – harmonica, harmony vocals (4, 8), guitars (11)
- Frank Funaro – drums (3, 6, 10)
- Rob White – percussion (7)

Production

- Eric Ambel – producer, mixing
- Ron Freeland – recording, mixing, additional recording
- Billy Brady – mixing, additional recording
- Tim Mulligan – additional recording
- John Nowland – additional recording
- Bob Ludwig – mastering at Masterdisk (New York City, New York)
- Michael Matousek – production coordinator
- Steven Jurgensmeyer – package design
- Ralph Steadman – illustration
- Brad Chesivoir – photography
