= Stu Daye =

American musician

- Born: White Plains, New York, U.S.
- Genre: Rock/Blues/Pop
- Instruments: Vocals, Guitar, Bass, Mandolin, Banjo, Keyboards, Slide Guitar
- Years active: 1975–present
- Labels: Columbia, Epic, Word of Mouth, A&M, Warner/Reprise

Stu Daye is an American musician. Daye has provided vocals and played guitar on records by such artists as Alice Cooper, Nils Lofgren, Tim Curry, Aerosmith, Neal Smith's KillSmith, to name a few as well as having a successful solo career.

== Stu Daye Band ==
Free Parking (Columbia, PC-33936) was Daye's first offering on a major label. It came out on Columbia in April 1976 and was produced by Jack Douglas of Aerosmith and Patti Smith fame. It was engineered by Shelly Yakus and Rod O’Brien. The album featured Steve Gadd and Rick Marotta on drums, Tony Levin on bass and featured special appearances by Aerosmith vocalist Steve Tyler and Billy Squier and the Uptown Horns. The Stu Daye Band consisted of at different times Christian Osbourne (guitar), Billy Cross (guitar), Mike Neville (bass) and Steve Missal and Tommy Thomson on drums. During this period Daye toured with Aerosmith, Jeff Beck and Jan Hammer, Thin Lizzy, Mott the Hoople, Ted Nugent, Rick Derringer, Pavlov's Dog and Rush on their 2112 tour to showcase his material.

After leaving The Stu Daye Band, Cross went on to form the Delta Cross Band whose single, "Astro Kid", was written by Daye. His version of this track can be heard on Daye's 2009 album, All Roads Lead Here.

== The Mix ==
The Mix was formed in New York in 1978 after an introduction of Daye to Corky Laing (formerly of Mountain) by Bob Ezrin. It was a classic quartet with Daye on vocals/guitar, Corky Laing on drums, David Grahame on bass guitar and vocals and Chris Meredith on keyboards. Managed by Aerosmiths management Leber & Krebs, they were fast becoming renowned for their energetic live performances making them the darlings of the New York scene. In 1980, they released their first and only album, American Glue, on Leber & Krebs owned label "Word of Mouth" (Epic Records). The album was produced by Felix Pappalardi. At a gig supporting Judas Priest on July 4, 1980 the band played through a hail of fireworks from the Judas Priest fans only to be lauded for completing their set.

== Theatre ==
Since 1985, Daye has occasionally been involved in original and fringe theatre. His credits include Kaboodle Theatre ('Falstaff's Revenge', 'Rasputin - The Forbidden Story' - Composer/Performer/Actor), George Dillon ('The Gospel According To Matthew' - Composer/Musician), Josette Bushell-Mingo ('The House of Bernarda Alba' - Composer/Musician), The Adam Temple Show (Actor/Performer) and Adam Temple's Football Fandango (Actor/Performer)

== The Rt. Rev. Swifty LeZarre ==
Currently living in London Stu Daye also performs as his alter-ego the Rt. Rev. Swifty LeZarre, a humorous modern day Blues/Americana social critic.

== Discography ==
As Stu Daye

- Free Parking (1976)
- All Roads Lead Here (2009)

With Alice Cooper

- Muscle of Love (1973)
- DaDa (1983)

With Genya Ravan

- Urban Desire (1978)

With Nils Lofgren

- Nils (1979)
- Face the Music (2014)

With Tim Curry

- Read My Lips (1978)

With The Mix

- American Glue (1980)

With Neal Smith KillSmith

- Sexual Saviour (2008)
- Platinum God (2009)
- KillSmith Goes West (2023)

Compilations

- Back In The Night (Various Artists) (Columbia AE7-1102/1103, USA) 2 x 7" (with Dr. Feelgood, Al Di Meola, Sutherland Brothers & Quiver, Pavlov's Dog and Les Dudek)
