= Mountains (Nils Lofgren album) =

Studio album by Nils Lofgren
- Released: July 21, 2023
- Studio: Studiocat Productions (Scottsdale, Arizona); Phoenix College (Phoenix, Arizona)
- Genre: Rock
- Length: 38:26
- Label: Cattle Track Road
- Producer: Nils Lofgren; Amy Lofgren

Nils Lofgren chronology
| Weathered (2020) | Mountains (2023) |

Mountains is a studio album by Nils Lofgren, released on July 21, 2023, through Cattle Track Road Records. It features guest appearances from David Crosby, Ringo Starr, Neil Young, and Ron Carter, and received generally positive reviews from critics.

== Background ==
Lofgren stated that the album started out "as a form of therapy but it very quickly grew beyond that" and that it was "so freeing to work without any restrictions", calling it "some of the most inspired work" he has ever made. He wrote and recorded the album at his home in Scottsdale, Arizona, also enlisting his regular engineer Jamison Weddle.

== Critical reception ==
Professional ratings
Aggregate scores
| Source | Rating |
|---|---|
| Metacritic | 68/100 |
Review scores
| Source | Rating |
| American Songwriter | 3/5 stars |
| PopMatters | 7/10 |

Mountains received a score of 68 out of 100 on review aggregator Metacritic based on eight critics' reviews, indicating "generally favorable" reception. Jedd Beaudoin of PopMatters wrote that Lofgren "never fails to deliver albums filled with glorious guitar playing, heartfelt songs, and a soulful look at the human condition. That his latest, Mountains, features all should come as no surprise", concluding that "he delivers something we didn't know we needed but now somehow can't live without". American Songwriter's Hal Horowitz found that "the set suffers from an excess of ballads" as songs like "Angel Blues" are "delicate, pretty, and charming, but edge dangerously close to schlocky and don't play to Lofgren's tougher talents", but nevertheless felt that "there's enough solid material here displaying Lofgren's impressive vocal, instrumental, and songwriting qualities to punch another notch on his belt of good but not great albums".

Mojo stated that Lofgren "and his guests have history, but the second half of Mountains might have benefited from fewer backing singers - however good, they over-egg the songs", while Uncut opined that "had Lofgren trusted his considerable gifts to carry these earnest songs, Mountains would've been a more satisfying album".

== Track listing ==
All tracks are written by Nils Lofgren, except "Back In Your Arms" written by Bruce Springsteen.

Mountains track listing
| No. | Title | Length |
|---|---|---|
| 1. | "Ain't the Truth Enough" | 3:24 |
| 2. | "Only Ticket Out" | 5:15 |
| 3. | "Back in Your Arms" | 4:22 |
| 4. | "Won't Cry No More (For Charlie Watts)" | 4:05 |
| 5. | "Nothin's Easy (For Amy)" | 3:35 |
| 6. | "Dream Killer" | 3:35 |
| 7. | "Only Your Smile" | 3:45 |
| 8. | "I Remember Her Name" | 4:13 |
| 9. | "We Better Find It" | 2:59 |
| 10. | "Angel Blues" | 3:13 |
| Total length: | | 38:26 |

== Personnel ==
- Nils Lofgren – vocals, keyboards, guitars, lap steel guitar, pedal steel guitar, dulcimer, bass, drums, percussion, vibraphone, harps
- Kevin McCormick – bass (1–3, 6)
- Ron Carter – string bass (7)
- Ringo Starr – drums (1), vocals (9)
- Andy Newmark – drums (2, 6)
- Timm Biery – drums (3)
- Luis Conte – percussion (3)
- Christine Vivona – concert harp (10)
- Cindy Mizelle – vocals (1, 3, 4, 6, 7, 10)
- The Howard University Gospel Choir – choir (3)
- Reginald Golden – vocal arrangements (3)
- Neil Young – vocals (5)
- David Crosby – vocals (8)
- Phoenix Children's Chorus – children's choir (9)
- Troy Meeker – musical director (9)
- Andrea Squires – musical director (9)
- Tanya Rosenfeld – executive director (9)
- Nina Garguilo, Toby Kidd, Kenny Miller, Holly Sheppard, Stephanie Stickford, Michael Tallino and Danya Tiller– choir singers (10)

=== Production ===
- Nils Lofgren – producer
- Amy Lofgren – producer
- Reginald Golden – choir vocals producer (3)
- Jamison Weddle – recording, mixing
- Bruce Sugar – recording for Ringo Starr (1, 9)
- Niko Bolas – recording for Neil Young (5) at The Surf Shack (Hollywood, California)
- Dave Darlington – string bass recording (7) at Bass Hit Recording (New York City, New York)
- James Raymond – recording for David Crosby (8)
- Mike Levy – concert harp recording (10) at 11:11 Studios (Tucson, Arizona)
- Greg Lukins – mastering
- Connor Barto – mastering
- Studio L (Alexandria, Virginia) – mastering location
- Ed Mell – cover and package artwork
- Tony Nolan – design, layout
- Dick Bangham – assembly, production
- Linda Bangham – assembly, production
- Tom Goldfogle – management

== Charts ==
Chart performance for Mountains
| Chart (2023) | Peak position |
|---|---|
| German Albums (Offizielle Top 100) | 85 |
| Scottish Albums (OCC) | 67 |
| UK Album Downloads (OCC) | 65 |
