= Flip (album) =

Album by Nils Lofgren

Studio album by Nils Lofgren
- Released: 1985
- Studio: The Warehouse (Philadelphia, Pennsylvania); Rehearsed at Sound Step Studios (Philadelphia, Pennsylvania)
- Genre: Heartland rock
- Length: 42:42
- Label: Towerbell Records
- Producer: Lance Quinn; Nils Lofgren

Nils Lofgren chronology
Wonderland (1983)	Flip (1985)	Code of the Road (1986)

Professional ratings
Review scores
Source	Rating
AllMusic	3/5 stars

Flip is a 1985 solo album from Nils Lofgren. The sound is typical of the style of the mid-'80s, with a heavy emphasis on the snare drum sound, Lofgren's guitar, and plenty of synthesizer. The name of the album reflects his signature trampoline 'flips' performed on stage whilst playing guitar solos.

== Track listing ==
All tracks composed by Nils Lofgren.

1. "Flip Ya Flip" – 4:11
2. "Secrets in the Street" – 4:33
3. "From the Heart" – 3:31
4. "Delivery Night" – 3:54
5. "King of the Rock" – 5:24
6. "Sweet Midnight" – 6:49
7. "New Holes in Old Shoes" – 4:35
8. "Dreams Die Hard" – 3:34
9. "Big Tears Fall" – 6:08

Later re-releases include the bonus track "Beauty and the Beast" – 3:44.

== Personnel ==
Adapted from liner notes.

The Band

- Nils Lofgren – vocals, keyboards, guitars
- T Lavitz – Oberheim synthesizer, PPG Wave
- Tommy Mandel – Yamaha DX7, Prophet-5, Casio synthesizer
- Wornell Jones – bass
- Andy Newmark – drums

Additional musicians

- Paul Griffin – acoustic piano, Hammond organ
- Steve Lombardeli – saxophone
- Rick Valenti – harmonica, backing vocals
- Devereaux Merryweather – backing vocals
- Rudy Rubini – backing vocals
- Tico Torres – backing vocals
- Jeri Bocchino – backing vocals on "Beauty and the Beast"

=== Production ===
- Nils Lofgren – producer
- Lance Quinn – producer
- Bill Scheniman – recording, mixing
- Mal – additional engineer
- John Cianci – assistant engineer
- Big Al Greaves – assistant engineer
- Paul K – assistant engineer
- Ed Stasium – remix engineer at Right Track Recording (New York City, New York)
- Greg Calbi – mastering at Sterling Sound (New York City, New York)
- Christopher Austopchuk – art direction
- Steve Borowski – photography
- Sheva Fruitman – stylist
- Jody Morlock – make-up
- Larry Mazer – management

Additional technical credits for "Beauty and the Beast"

- Ronnie Freeland – mixing, additional recording
- Bill Mueller – mixing
- Flip album software by flippagemaker.com

== Charts ==
Chart performance for Flip
Chart (1985)	Peak position
Swedish Albums (Sverigetopplistan)	12
UK Albums (OCC)	36
US Billboard 200	150
