= 1+1 (Grin album) =

Studio album by Grin
- Released: January 1972
- Studio: Wally Heider, San Francisco
- Genre: Rock
- Length: 34:24
- Label: Spindizzy; Epic (reissue)
- Producer: David Briggs

Grin chronology
Grin (1971)	1+1 (1972)	All Out (1973)

Professional ratings
Review scores
Source	Rating
AllMusic	4/5 stars
Christgau's Record Guide	A
Tom Hull – on the Web	B+
The Village Voice	A−

1+1 is a 1972 album by Grin, featuring songs by their guitarist Nils Lofgren. As well as being an album in its own right, this was released by CBS in the UK as part of a 1976 double album set along with its predecessor Grin. The original LP was a gatefold. It had a photo of Nils on the front, with Bob & Bob on the back. The inside features triple exposure photos of the band members performing, giving the impression of motion. The sides are not labelled 1 and 2; instead, the first side is labelled "Rockin' Side" while the other is "Dreamy Side".

== Track listing ==
All tracks are written by Nils Lofgren.

No.	Title	Length
1.	"White Lies"	3:27
2.	"Please Don't Hide"	3:58
3.	"Slippery Fingers"	4:07
4.	"Moon Tears"	2:16
5.	"End Unkind"	4:02
6.	"Sometimes"	2:36
7.	"Lost a Number"	3:08
8.	"Hi, Hello Home"	2:28
9.	"Just a Poem"	2:40
10.	"Soft Fun"	5:39

== Personnel ==
Grin

- Nils Lofgren – guitars, keyboards, vocals
- Bob Berberich – drums, vocals
- Bob Gordon – bass, vocals

with:

- Graham Nash – vocals on "Hi, Hello Home"
- David Blumberg – orchestration on "Just a Poem" and "Soft Fun"

Technical

- Photography – Ed Caraeff
- Design – Wayne Kimbell
- Distributed by CBS Records
