= Old School (Nils Lofgren album) =

Studio album by Nils Lofgren
- Released: December 6, 2011
- Studio: Studiocat Productions (Scottsdale, Arizona); Chaton Studios (Phoenix, Arizona); Glovebox Studios (White Rock, British Columbia, Canada)
- Genre: Rock
- Length: 44:31
- Label: Vision
- Producer: Nils Lofgren; Brian Christian

Nils Lofgren chronology
The Loner – Nils Sings Neil (2008)	Old School (2011)	Face the Music (2014)

Old School is an album by Nils Lofgren, released on December 6, 2011, through Vision Records. The album received mixed reviews.

== Critical reception ==
Professional ratings
Review scores
Source	Rating
AllMusic	3.5/5 stars
Classic Rock	3/5 stars
PopMatters	3/10

Hal Horowitz, reviewing the album for AllMusic, stated that "to his credit, Lofgren doesn't modernize his style to endear himself for a younger audience, but has written 11 out of these dozen selections in the same melodic rock format that he's adhered to since his days in Grin". Classic Rock's Terry Staunton found "Lofgren is sprightly enough to play most of the instruments himself" and noted he "show[s] the whippersnapers how it's done". Allison Stewart of The Washington Post summarized the album as "alternately rueful and upbeat" with "midlife crisis anthems ('60 Is the New 18'), get-off-my-lawn rockers (the title track) and graceful, just short of gloomy ballads ('Miss You Ray')".

Brice Ezell of PopMatters wrote that the album is "likely to appeal to die-hard fans of Lofgren and maybe some fans of bluesy guitar solos, but to those unfamiliar with Lofgren's career the album will sound aged in both sonic and lyric". Rob Tannenbaum of Rolling Stone described it as a "weird, funny, crabby LP about seemingly everything that annoys [Lofgren]: Congress, yoga, lattes, sexting, any teen 'dressed like a whore.' Lofgren switches from acoustic ballads to Stones–ish rock, where his voice turns craggy and stubbly". Shawn Donohue of Glide Magazine stated, "Grumpy-Old-Pissed-Off-Man might have been a more apt title" for the album and concluded, "sure Nils may be decidedly Old School, but if you are looking for a new school way of hearing him in 2012, wait for the next E-Street tour as his sideman guitar work is still his best asset".

== Track listing ==
All tracks are written by Nils Lofgren, except where noted.

Old School track listing
No.	Title	Writer(s)	Length
1.	"Old School"		3:12
2.	"60 Is the New 18"		3:03
3.	"Miss You Ray"		2:39
4.	"Love Stumbles On"		3:52
5.	"Amy Joan Blues"		2:43
6.	"Irish Angel"	Bruce McCabe	5:12
7.	"Ain't Too Many of Us Left"		4:42
8.	"When You Were Mine"		4:33
9.	"Just Because You Love Me"		2:32
10.	"Dream Big"		4:30
11.	"Let Her Get Away"	Lofgren, Root Boy Slim	3:09
12.	"Why Me"		4:24
Total length:			44:31

== Personnel ==
- Nils Lofgren – vocals, keyboards, guitars, other instruments
- Mike Smith – pedal steel guitar (9), vocals (9)
- Mike King – bass (9), vocals (9)
- Gary Bruzzese – drums (1, 7), handclaps
- Todd Chuba – drums (9), vocals (9)
- John Ramirez – additional handclaps (9), vocals (9)
- Jamison Weddle – additional handclaps (9), vocals (9)
- Jerry Donato – saxophones (1, 10)
- Greg Varlotta – trombone (1, 10), trumpet (1, 10), tap percussion (2)
- Lou Gramm – vocals (1)
- Paul Rodgers – vocals (5)
- Sam Moore – vocals (7)

=== Production ===
- Nils Lofgren – producer (1–11)
- Bruce Christian – producer (12), recording (12), mixing (12)
- Jamison Weddle – recording (1–11), mixing (1–11), additional recording (1–11), transfer engineer (1–11)
- John Ramirez – additional recording (1–11), transfer engineer (1–11)
- Andy Knoll – vocal recording for Lou Gramm (1)
- Pat Glover – vocal recording for Paul Rodgers (5)
- Otto D'Agnolo – vocal recording for Sam Moore (7)
- Billy Wolf – mastering at Wolf Productions (Arlington, Virginia)
- Omar Ojeda – front and back cover photography, inside right and booklet cover photography, lyric page photo for Track 7
- Mark Hendrickson – inside left photo illustration, lyric page photo for Track 8
- Dylan Covington – metal sculptures on lyric pages for Tracks 1 & 8
- Dick Bangham – package design, cover photo illustration
- Linda Bangham – package design, cover photo illustration
- Jill Kimura – coordinator
- Verna Van Wert – coordinator
- Anson Smith – management

== Charts ==
Chart performance for Old School
Chart (2011)	Peak position
Swedish Albums (Sverigetopplistan)	60
