= Stopping the clock =

Parliamentary procedure

Stopping the clock is a controversial practice in American and Canadian parliamentary procedure in which a legislature literally or notionally stops the clock (or moves the hands backwards), usually for the purpose of meeting a constitutional or statutory deadline. Riddick's Rules of Procedure notes, "The official clock is stopped by agreement of the 'powers that be' without any motion or announcement one minute before the designated hour." Sometimes it is done to allow more time for lobbying or deal-making to obtain the necessary votes for one side to prevail on a measure. Some legislatures actually stop the clock, and others simply use it as a metaphor for continuing business after a time deadline has passed. Stopping the clock is also sometimes done for ceremonial purposes to ensure that both houses of a bicameral legislature adjourn simultaneously.

The glossary of the Alabama State Legislature notes that the plug to the electric clock in the Senate or House chamber is sometimes pulled to allow the staff to complete the massive paper work required before sine die adjournment. Sometimes a legislature will even take a recess while the clock is stopped and then resume its work. The New York Legislature used to literally stop the clock at midnight on April 1 in order to pass the budget by the constitutional deadline, but eventually ended the practice and began simply disregarding the requirement. In 2004, it finally moved the deadline back to May 1.

In a debate of the Legislative Assembly of Saskatchewan, it was noted that stopping the clock is done by tradition and with unanimous consent, when the Opposition agrees with the Government that valuable business can be done by extending the hours. In contrast, the speaker of the Illinois Legislature unilaterally stopped the clock at midnight on the last day of its session on June 30, 1988, to allow further debate before approving money to replace Comiskey Park, a decision that ultimately passed by one vote. Had this maneuver not been done, the White Sox presumably would have moved to Florida. Stadium consultant Marc Ganis noted, "As the clock struck down in St. Petersburg, they started popping champagne corks and didn't realize that the speaker of the house can literally stop the clock in Illinois. At the stroke of midnight, we got to 60 votes."
