= Barnaby Barford =

British artist (born 1977)

- Born: 1977 (age 48–49); Redhill, Surrey, England
- Education: Royal College of Art
- Website: www.barnabybarford.co.uk

Barnaby Barford (born 1977), currently lives and works in London is a British artist, best known for his sculptural work using industrially made ceramics in unexpected ways.

== Career ==
Barford graduated with a First Class BA Hons in 3D Design at Plymouth University in 2000. In 1999 he took part in the Erasmus Programme, travelling to The Higher Institute for Artistic Industries in Faenza, Italy. He went on to graduate from Royal College of Art in 2002 with an MA in Ceramics and Glass. He has been an associate lecturer at Central Saint Martins in London since 2004.

In 2015 Barford created The Tower of Babel for the Victoria and Albert Museum in London. Alun Graves, Senior Curator of Ceramics and Glass Collections at the Victoria and Albert Museum described the sculptural installation as "a groundbreaking project" for the museum. Standing six metres high, it was made up of 3000 individual bone china buildings, each depicting a real London shop photographed by the artist. Derelict shops and pound stores appeared at the bottom of the Tower, while London's exclusive boutiques and galleries featured at the summit. Explicitly blurring the boundaries of art and commerce, each shop was for sale through the Victoria and Albert Museum. With prices rising as the Tower ascends, it forced people to confront where they fit into the hierarchy of consumption. In the two years it took to make The Tower of Babel, Barford cycled over 1000 miles and visited every postcode in London. In the same year Barford was commissioned to create a permanent public artwork for the London Borough of Waltham Forest. The Elephant and The Tortoise is a 4 x 2 meter stainless steel sculpture which commemorates British Xylonite's Halex Factory that stood on the site in Highams Park between 1897 and 1971.

In 2013 a major exhibition charting Barford's practice to date was mounted at the Virginia Museum of Contemporary Art in the US. This exhibition then travelled to Dovecot Studios in Edinburgh, Scotland in 2014. Also in 2014 Barford was commissioned to create five permanent wall sculptures for the Louis Vuitton Townhouse inside London's Selfridges, each sculpture was made from "thousands of ceramic and porcelain flowers, leaves and butterflies".

In 2008 Barford made Damaged Goods, an animated film commissioned and funded by Channel 4 and Arts Council England. The film told a love story featuring porcelain figurines and was set on the shelves of a bric-a-brac shop. The figurines created by Barford for the film were displayed in the David Gill Gallery in February 2010. Where he is currently represented by: David Gill Galleries, St James’ London.

== Solo exhibitions ==
MORE MORE MORE, David Gill Gallery, London (2019)

Me Want Now, David Gill Gallery, London (2016)

The Tower of Babel, Victoria and Albert Museum, London (2015)

Barnaby Barford, Museum of Contemporary Art, Virginia, US (2013)

The Seven Deadly Sins, David Gill Gallery, London (2013)

Love Is... David Gill Gallery, London (2011)

The Battle of Trafalgar, OA Madrid, Spain (2010)

Damaged Goods, David Gill Gallery, London (2010)

The Good, The Bad, The Belle, Spring Projects, London (2009)

Private Lives, David Gill Gallery, London (2007)

A Day In The Life, David Gill Gallery, Design Miami (2006)

Beauty of the Beast, David Gill Gallery, London (2005)

Dear God, Paul Smith, Floral St, London (2004)

Ceramic Illusions, Glynn Vivian Art Gallery, Swansea (2002)

== Public collections ==
Crafts Council, London, UK

Victoria and Albert Museum, London, UK

Shipley Art Gallery, Tyne & Wear Museums, UK

Paintings in Hospitals Collection, UK

The Potteries Museum & Art Gallery, UK

The Mint Museum, Charlotte, North Carolina, US

Museum of Fine Art, Houston, Texas, US

National Museum, Sweden

National Library of the Netherlands

National Library of France

Public Library of Reims, France

Public Library of Limoges, France
