= Daniel Pighín =

Argentine footballer

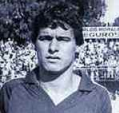

Personal information
- Full name: Daniel Guadalupe Pighín Rojas
- Date of birth: 4 September 1962 (age 64)
- Place of birth: Margarita, Santa Fe, Argentina
- Position: Midfielder

Senior career*
Years	Team	Apps	(Gls)
1983–1984	Colón		
1985–1989	Gimnasia y Esgrima (LP)	102	(5)
1990–1991	Atlas	19	(0)
1992	Rosario Central	6	(0)
1993–1994	Estudiantes (LP)	46	(0)
- * Club domestic league appearances and goals

Daniel Pighín (born 4 September 1962) is a retired Argentine football midfielder who played for several clubs in Argentina and Mexico, including Club Gimnasia y Esgrima La Plata, Estudiantes de La Plata and Club Atlas.

== Career ==
Born in Margarita, Santa Fe Province, Pighín played 14 seasons of top-flight club football.
