= Night After Night (Nils Lofgren album) =

Live album by Nils Lofgren
- Released: October 1977
- Genre: Heartland rock
- Label: A&M
- Producer: David Briggs

Nils Lofgren chronology
I Came to Dance (1977)	Night After Night (1977)	Nils (1979)

Professional ratings
Review scores
Source	Rating
AllMusic	2.5/5 stars

Night After Night is the second live album by Nils Lofgren, released in 1977. It was released as a double LP.

== Track listing ==
All tracks composed by Nils Lofgren; except where indicated

1. "Take You to the Movies Tonight"
2. "Back It Up"
3. "Keith Don't Go (Ode to the Glimmer Twin)"
4. "Like Rain"
5. "Cry Tough"
6. "It's Not a Crime"
7. "Goin' Back" (Carole King, Gerry Goffin)
8. "You're the Weight"
9. "Beggar's Day (Eulogy to Danny Whitten)"
10. "Moon Tears"
11. "Code of the Road"
12. "Rock & Roll Crook"
13. "Goin' South"
14. "Incidentally... It's Over"
15. "I Came to Dance"
- CD version of the album does not contain the song "Moon Tears". The songs "Back It Up" and "I Came to Dance" have been abridged.
- The 2014 Japan mini-LP CD (UICY 76085/6) includes the full track listing on 2 CDs faithful to the original.

== Personnel ==
- Nils Lofgren – lead vocals, guitars, piano (07)
- Tom Lofgren – guitar, organ, backing vocals
- Wornell "Sonic Prince" Jones – bass, timbales, backing vocals
- David Platshon – drums, percussion
- Rev. Patrick Henderson – piano, organ, backing vocals

Technical

- Produced by David Briggs and Nils Lofgren
- Recorded at Hammersmith Odeon, London; Apollo Theatre, Glasgow; The Roxy, Los Angeles (tracks 1–3 and 15)
- Bob Edwards, Tom Anderson, Tim Foster – recording engineer
- Mastered by Phil Brown

== Charts ==
Chart performance for Night After Night
Chart (1977)	Peak position
Canada Top Albums/CDs (RPM)	75
Swedish Albums (Sverigetopplistan)	23
UK Albums (Official Charts)	38
US Billboard 200	44
