= Damaged Goods (album) =

Studio album by Nils Lofgren
- Released: 1995
- Studio: Omega (Kensington, Maryland); Quad (New York City, New York)
- Genre: Rock
- Length: 53:21
- Label: Pure
- Producer: Roger Greenawalt

Nils Lofgren chronology
Every Breath (1994)	Damaged Goods (1995)	Acoustic Live (1997)

Damaged Goods is an album by the American musician Nils Lofgren, released in 1995. The title track was the first single. Lofgren supported the album with North American and European tours.

== Production ==
The album was produced by Roger Greenawalt, who also played bass. Andy Newmark played drums. Damaged Goods was Lofgren's first album in more than a decade that did not feature guest spots from his more famous musician friends. He wrote most of the songs on acoustic guitar and chose to sing in a lower octave. "Life" was cowritten by Lou Reed. Branford Marsalis played saxophone on a few tracks.

== Critical reception ==
Professional ratings
Review scores
Source	Rating
AllMusic	3/5 stars
Daily Press	3.5/5 stars
MusicHound Rock: The Essential Album Guide	3.5/5 stars

The Oregonian posited that "perhaps Nils Lofgren is the American Keith Richards—the soul of rock 'n' roll, North American division." The Washington Post noted that "Damaged Goods has an emotional intensity and racing narrative flow that sets it apart from his previous work," and praised the "typically imaginative guitar work, everything from scorched blues lines to neo-psychedelic sweeps." The Chicago Tribune said that "Lofgren roughs up some typically buoyant tunes with a gruff, bluesy delivery and odd production touches."

The Plain Dealer deemed Damaged Goods "an ambitious, richly textured and eclectic rock record." The Philadelphia Inquirer admired "Lofgren's raggedly tuneful rock and endearingly rickety vocals." The Daily Press concluded that "he's generally good for three or four really good tunes per record, and that's about it." The Record considered it one of the best rock albums of 1995.

AllMusic wrote that "Lofgren remains, in essence, a guitar hero, and on the album's 12 tracks, he seems to have spent more time working on the riffs and textures he could get out of his guitars than on anything else."

== Track listing ==
All tracks are written by Nils Lofgren, except where noted.

No.	Title	Writer(s)	Length
1.	"Damaged Goods"		3:45
2.	"Only Five Minutes"		5:29
3.	"Alone"		5:18
4.	"Trip to Mars"		5:18
5.	"Here for You"		3:36
6.	"Black Books"		3:34
7.	"Setting Sun"		3:46
8.	"Life"	Lofgren; Lou Reed	3:08
9.	"Heavy Hats"		4:05
10.	"In the Room"		4:32
11.	"Nothin's Fallin'"		5:09
12.	"Don't Be Late for Yesterday"		5:49

== Personnel ==
The band

- Nils Lofgren – vocals, keyboards, accordion, guitars, percussion
- Roger Greenawalt – bass guitar, percussion, samples
- Andy Newmark – drums, percussion

Additional musicians

- Marco Botelho – cello (1–4, 7–9, 11)
- Patricia Smith – viola (1–4, 7–9, 11)
- Teri Lazar – violin (1–4, 7–9, 11)
- Kim Miller – violin (1–4, 7–9, 11)
- Branford Marsalis – saxophone (2, 8)

Harmony vocals

- Luke Foster, Tim Gerhold, Sarah Gunther, Amanda Hamlin, Rudy Henkel, Jo Jo Kim, Kerri Lazar, Matt Lofgren, Molly Lofgren, Tess Lofgren, Allie Park, Emmie Patterson, Sally Patterson, Erica Taffs, Amanda Wallace and Meg Wood – harmony vocals (4)
- Paul Courtney, Janet Jones, Parris Lane and Alton McClain Scarborough – harmony vocals (6)
- Tom Lofgren – harmony vocals (12)

Production

- Roger Greenawalt – producer, recording, engineer, mixing
- Dave Goodermuth – engineer
- Scott Hollingsworth – engineer
- John Billingsley – assistant engineer
- Paul Mahajan – assistant engineer
- Corby Stutzman – assistant engineer
- Ted Jensen – mastering at Sterling Sound (New York, NY)
- Michael Matousek – production coordinator
- Brad Chesivior – photography
- Lisa Pampillonia – design
