= Back It Up!! =

Live album by Nils Lofgren
- Released: 1975
- Recorded: October 31, 1975
- Venues: Record Plant, Sausalito, CA
- Length: 44:12
- Labels: A&M; Hip-O Select (reissue)

Nils Lofgren chronology
Nils Lofgren (1975)	Back It Up!! (1975)	Cry Tough (1976)

Professional ratings
Review scores
Source	Rating
Allmusic	4.5/5 stars

Back It Up!! is a promotional "live" album from Nils Lofgren initially released 1975. The title of the original vinyl LP was Back It Up!! – Nils Lofgren Live – An Authorized Bootleg. Although the recording was officially released by A&M Records, the artwork was designed to give the appearance of a live bootleg recording, similar to Decca Records' original vinyl release of the Who's Live at Leeds in 1970, which was a legitimate live album designed to look like a bootleg. Back It Up!! was not officially available to the public until it was issued on CD in 2007, 32 years after its original release.

== Background ==
The songs were recorded at the Record Plant in Sausalito, California, on October 31, 1975, and primarily feature material from Lofgren's first solo album which had been released earlier in the year. At the time of the recording, Lofgren had recently signed with A&M and had just begun a solo career following the dissolution of his previous group, Grin. Despite its limited release, songs from Back It Up!! were featured on FM radio broadcasts during the 1970s and had been generally praised by the musical press as worthy of a proper release.

The CD re-release includes the same seven songs from the original vinyl release in 1975. An additional song, "Rock and Roll Crook", was also performed at the concert (following "Goin' Back"), but was not included on the 1975 vinyl release or the CD reissue. Currently, all of the songs from Back It Up!!, along with "Rock and Roll Crook", are available as a digital download from the Wolfgang's Vault website.

== Track listing ==
All songs by Nils Lofgren unless otherwise indicated

1. "Take You to the Movies Tonight / Back It Up" – 6:59
2. "Keith Don't Go (Ode to the Glimmer Twin)" – 6:26
3. "I Don't Want to Know" – 3:48
4. "The Sun Hasn't Set on This Boy Yet" – 3:41
5. "Goin' Back" (Gerry Goffin, Carole King) – 6:04
6. "Like Rain" – 6:21
7. "Beggar's Day / Soft Fun" – 10:53

== Personnel ==
=== Musicians ===
- Nils Lofgren – guitars, piano, vocals
- Tom Lofgren – guitar, backing vocals
- Scotty Ball – bass
- Michael Zak – drums
- Al Kooper – electric piano (special guest)

=== Technical ===
- Mark Omann – mastering engineer
- Michele Horie – art direction
- Greg Rose – design
- Richard Aaron – photography
- Bud Scoppa – liner notes
