= Nils Lofgren =

American rock musician (born 1951)

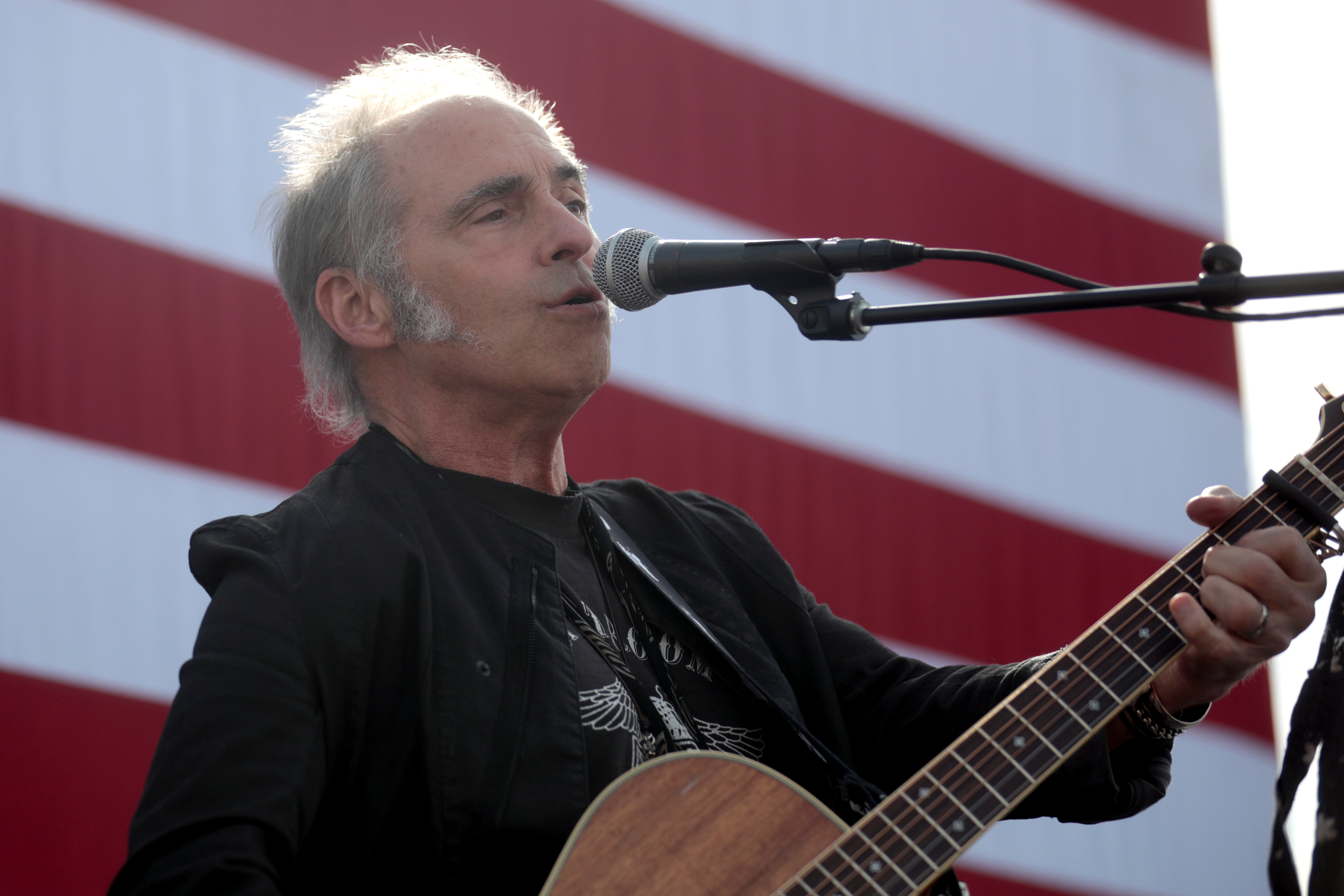
- Lofgren performing in 2019

Background information
- Born: Nils Hilmer Lofgren; June 21, 1951 (age 75); Chicago, Illinois, U.S.
- Genres: Roots rock; heartland rock; blues rock; hard rock
- Occupations: Musician; songwriter
- Instruments: Vocals; guitar; keyboards; accordion; pedal steel guitar; banjo
- Years active: 1965–present
- Labels: A&M; Columbia; MCA; Rykodisc; Capitol; Vision Music; Pure Records; Fantasy
- Member of: E Street Band
- Formerly of: Crazy Horse
- Website: nilslofgren.com
- Lofgren's voice Lofgren on his early music career. Recorded July 3, 2026

Nils Hilmer Lofgren (born June 21, 1951) is an American rock musician, recording artist, songwriter, and multi-instrumentalist. Along with his work as a solo artist, he has been a member of Bruce Springsteen's E Street Band since 1984, a member of Crazy Horse, and the founder and frontman of the band Grin. In 2014, Lofgren was inducted into the Rock and Roll Hall of Fame as a member of the E Street Band.

== Early life and education ==
Lofgren was born in Chicago, Illinois, to an Italian mother from Nicosia, Sicily and a Swedish father. When he was a young child, the family moved to the Washington, D.C., suburb of Bethesda, Maryland. Lofgren's first instrument was classical accordion, beginning at age five, which he studied seriously for ten years. After studying classical music and jazz, throughout his youth, Lofgren switched his emphasis to rock music, and focused on the piano and the guitar. Although left-handed, Lofgren plays the guitar right-handed.

Lofgren attended Walter Johnson High School in Bethesda, Maryland, but dropped out in 1968 at age 17 to pursue his music career. Lofgren gained some attention in the area for writing the commercial jingle "Nobody Bothers Me' for the karate Jhoon Rhee studio.He had been a competitive gymnast in high school, a skill that was used on stage later in his performing career and reflected in the name of his 1985 album, Flip.

== Career ==
=== Grin ===
In 1968, Lofgren formed the band Grin with bassist George Daly and drummer Bob Berberich. Daly and Berberich were former players in the DC band The Hangmen. The group played in venues throughout the Washington, D.C., area.

Lofgren met Neil Young while Young was performing at the Georgetown club the Cellar Door, and began a long association. Young invited Lofgren to come to California and the Grin trio (Lofgren, Daly and Berberich) drove to California and lived for some months at a home Young rented in Laurel Canyon, Los Angeles. Lofgren would eventually use his album credits from working with Young to land Grin a record deal in 1971.

Daly left the band early on to become a Columbia Records A&R executive and was replaced by bassist Bob Gordon, who remained through the release of four critically acclaimed albums from 1971 to 1974, with guitar as Lofgren's primary instrument. The single "White Lies" got heavy airplay on Washington, D.C.-area radio. Lofgren wrote the majority of the group's songs and often shared vocal duties with other members of the band (primarily drummer Bob Berberich). After the second album, he added brother Tom Lofgren as a rhythm guitarist. Grin were released by their record company due to disappointing sales.

=== Neil Young and Crazy Horse ===
Lofgren joined Neil Young at age 18 to play piano and guitar on the album After the Gold Rush. Lofgren maintained his musical relationship with Young, appearing as a part of the Santa Monica Flyers on Young's Tonight's the Night album and tour, and again on the Trans album and tour. He has also been a recurring member of Crazy Horse (1970–1971; 2018–present), appearing on their 1971 LP and contributing songs to their catalogue. In 2018, Lofgren re-joined Crazy Horse and along with the band performed on Young's 2019 album Colorado and 2021's Barn as well as on 2022's World Record.

In 2023, the current members of Crazy Horse, along with Young, released the album All Roads Lead Home under the name Molina, Talbot, Lofgren and Young.

=== Solo career ===
After Grin disbanded in 1974, Lofgren released his self-titled debut solo album which was a success with critics; a 1975 Rolling Stone review by Jon Landau labeled it one of the finest rock albums of the year, and NME ranked it fifth on its list of albums of the year. Subsequent albums did not always garner critical favor, although Cry Tough was voted number 10 in the 1976 NME Album round up; I Came to Dance in particular received a scathing review in the New Rolling Stone Record Guide. He achieved progressive rock radio hits in the mid-1970s with "Back It Up", "Keith Don't Go" and "I Came to Dance". His song "Bullets Fever", about the 1978 NBA champion Washington Bullets, would become a favorite in the Washington area. Throughout the 1970s, Lofgren released solo albums and toured extensively with a backing band that usually included brother Tom on rhythm guitar. Lofgren's concerts displayed his reputation for theatrics, such as playing guitar while doing flips on a trampoline.

In 1971, Lofgren appeared on stage on a PBS special for Roy Buchanan, with Bill Graham. In 1973, he appeared with Grin on NBC on The Midnight Special, performing three songs live. In 1978, he wrote and sang the "Nobody Bothers Me" theme for a D.C. Jhoon Rhee Tae Kwon Do advertisement, and also appeared in the critically panned Sgt. Pepper's Lonely Hearts Club Band movie. In 1985, Lofgren appeared on Late Night with David Letterman, to promote his solo release Flip. He is credited on two of Lou Gramm's (of Foreigner) solo albums: Ready or Not (1987), where Lofgren is credited as lead guitarist, and Long Hard Look (1989), where he is credited as one of the guitarists. In 1987, he contributed the television show theme arrangement for Hunter. In 1993, he contributed to The Simpsons, with two Christmas jingles with Bart. In 1995, he appeared on a PBS tribute to the Beatles along with Dr. John. From 1991 to 1995, he was the CableAce Awards musical director and composer.

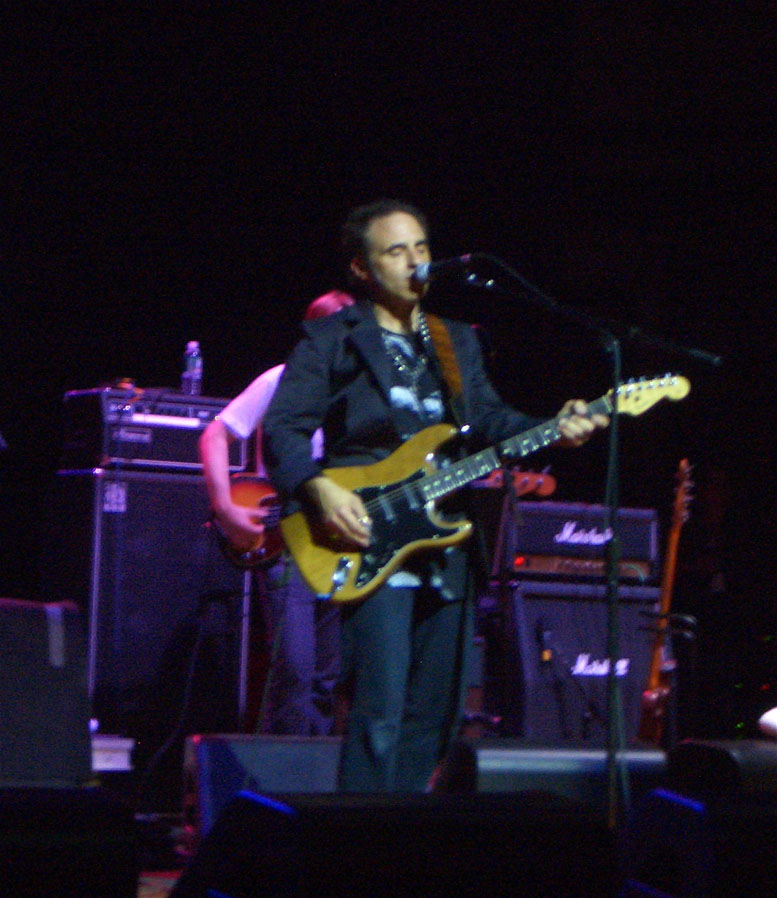
Nils Lofgren performing at the Beacon Theatre Benefit For Arthur Lee

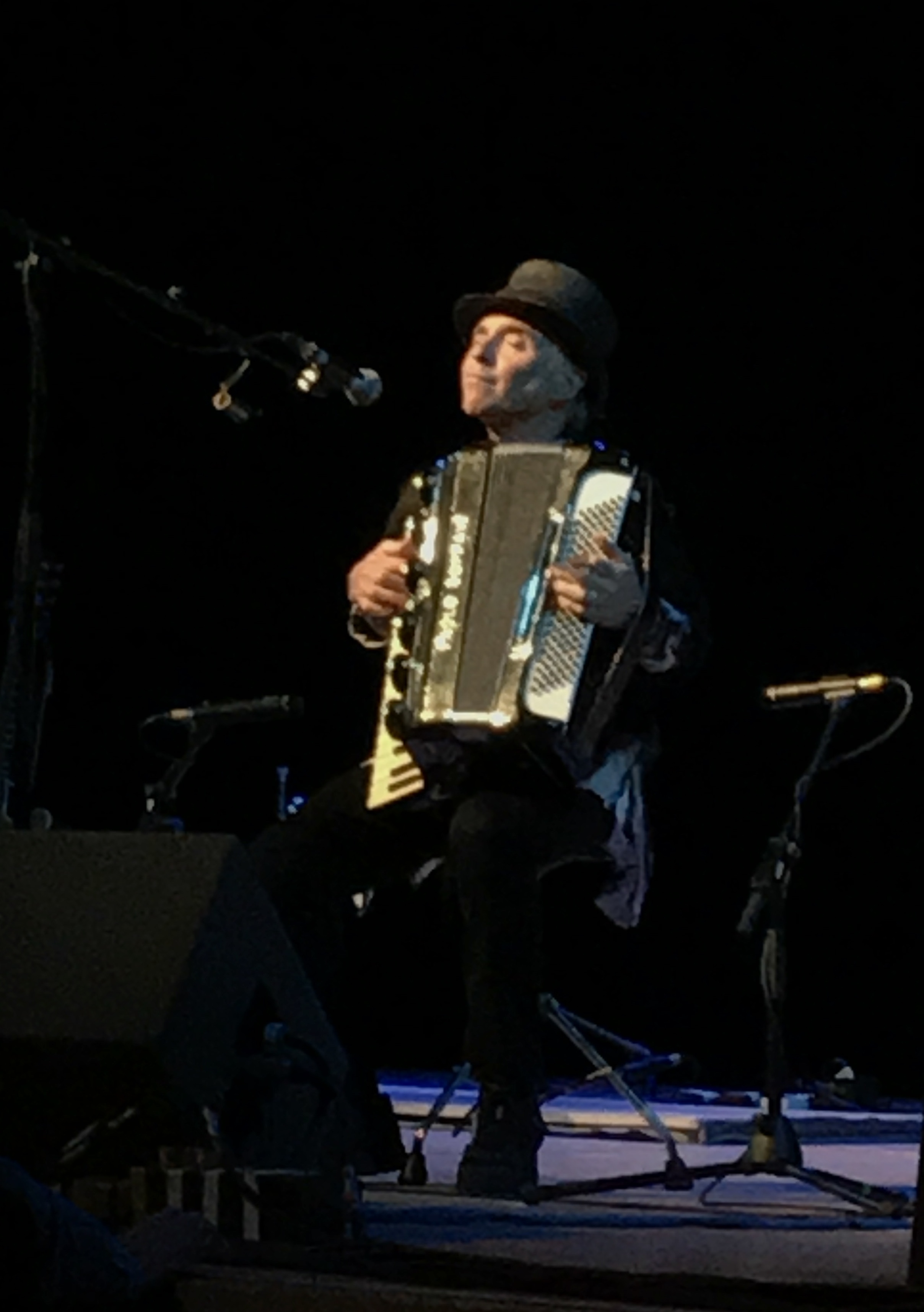
Nils Lofgren playing the accordion Birmingham Town Hall 16 May 2018

Lofgren continues to record and to tour as a solo act, and has worked with Patti Scialfa, and as a two-time member of Ringo Starr's All-Starr Band. Many of the people he worked with on those tours appeared on his 1991 album, Silver Lining. In the 2000s, he got his own "Nils Lofgren Day" in Montgomery County, Maryland (August 25). In 2006, Lofgren released Sacred Weapon, featuring guest appearances by David Crosby, Graham Nash, Willie Nelson and Martin Sexton. In 2006, he recorded a live DVD Nils Lofgren & Friends: Acoustic Live at the Birchmere in Alexandria, Virginia.

On June 23, 2006, Lofgren performed at a benefit concert for Arthur Lee at New York's Beacon Theatre, along with Robert Plant, Ian Hunter, Yo La Tengo and Garland Jeffreys. In 2007, he appeared playing guitar as part of Jerry Lee Lewis' backing band for Lewis' Last Man Standing Live concert DVD. He released The Loner – Nils Sings Neil, an album of acoustic covers of Neil Young songs, in 2008.

In September 2008, Lofgren had hip replacement surgery for both of his hips as a result of years of playing basketball, performing back flips on stage, and age.

In August 2014, a box set, Face the Music, was released on the Fantasy label. The career-spanning retrospective contains nine CDs and a DVD covering 45 years.

The creation of Lofgren's 2015 live album UK 2015 Face the Music Tour was inspired by his wife Amy commenting that his recent live shows were the best she had seen him perform, as well as fans wanting to have a recording of the show they had just seen.

In December 2018, PBS NewsHour aired a 10-minute career retrospective Nils Lofgren: 50 years of 'just being a guy in the band'.

Lofgren was a guest on a "Private Lives" one-hour radio special on East London Radio in the UK in October 2020. This series is shared across radio stations online and on FM/DAB, covering much of the UK.

On July 21, 2023, he published his last album, titled Mountains.

On February 6, 2026, Lofgren released the song, “No Kings, No Hate, No Fear”, as a free download on his website. The song was in response to President Donald Trump, ICE, and the killings of Renée Good and Alex Pretti. Springsteen himself a little over a week earlier also released a song titled "Streets of Minneapolis", which touched on the same topics as Lofgren's song. Lofgren compared the current times to the Vietnam War era saying: “I have such PTSD from those times. And this time … this is worse. And that’s one of the reasons I wanted to try writing an anthem that was primitive, that was honest, that didn’t have a lot of words, that was repetitive. Because we need that. I mean, I thought we evolved from the late ’60s with some of the great civil rights laws. And I just thought we were past that and evolving as a people. … we’re all watching in horror as people are getting killed in the street, and not just Renee Good and Alex Pretti. Other people are being killed, too. And our heart goes out to all of them. But it’s just unacceptable and horrific, and we gotta try to get out of it.”

=== Bruce Springsteen and the E Street Band ===
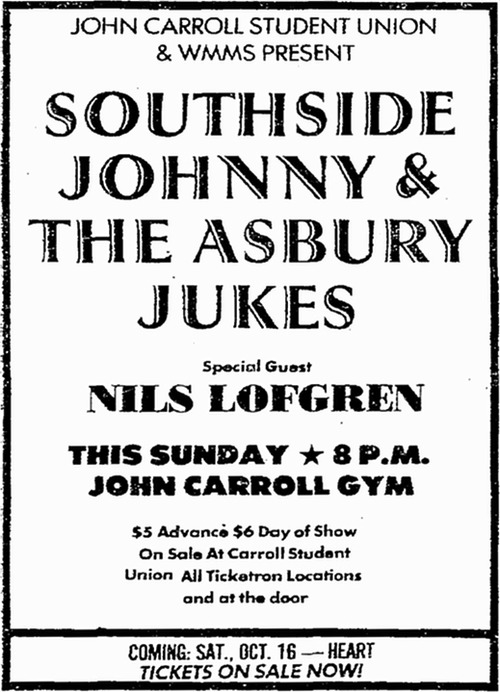
An ad for a Southside Johnny concert featuring Lofgren as guest

In 1984, he joined Bruce Springsteen's backing band, the E Street Band, as the replacement for Steven Van Zandt on guitar and vocals, in time for Springsteen's Born in the U.S.A. Tour. Lofgren appeared on his first Springsteen album with 1987's Tunnel of Love, playing the guitar solo on the title track, and took part in the Tunnel of Love Express and Human Rights Now! supporting tours in 1988. In 1989, Springsteen broke up the E Street Band and Lofgren returned to his solo work.

In 1995, the E Street Band, featuring both Lofgren and Van Zandt, recorded new songs for Springsteen's Greatest Hits album, though nothing else came from this reunion. In 1999, Springsteen was inducted into the Rock and Roll Hall of Fame as a solo act. The E Street Band would finally be inducted fifteen years later in 2014. Despite not being inducted in 1999 with Springsteen, the E Street Band (again with Lofgren and Van Zandt) performed with him for the first time since 1988 at the induction ceremony. This led to a successful reunion tour from 1999 to 2000 and a lineup featuring both Lofgren and Van Zandt as full-time members. The reunion tour resulted in 2002's album, The Rising, the first studio album featuring the E Street Band since 1984, and another tour in 2002 and 2003. Springsteen then worked on other projects and toured without the E Street Band's involvement until 2007's Magic album and tour of 2007/2008. This tour was followed by 2009's Working on a Dream album and tour. In 2012, Springsteen released Wrecking Ball, which featured some of the E Street Band members; Lofgren did not appear, though he did perform with the band on the album's supporting tour. 2014 saw the release of the album High Hopes along with another tour. In 2016, Springsteen celebrated the 35th anniversary of his album The River, with a tour in support of The Ties That Bind: The River Collection box set. In 2020, Springsteen released his album Letter to You, which featured the E Street Band; a supporting tour was delayed until 2023 due to the COVID-19 pandemic. Lofgren tested positive for COVID-19, forcing him to miss one show on the tour in February 2023. It was the first show Lofgren had missed since joining the band in 1984.

=== Other work ===
The late novelist Clive Cussler lived close to Lofgren's Arizona home, and collaborated on a song with him titled "What Ever Happened to Muscatel?"

On August 17, 2017, Lofgren was inducted into the Arizona Music & Entertainment Hall of Fame.

In May 2018, Lofgren replaced Frank Sampedro in Crazy Horse for their reunion concerts with Neil Young.

On January 29, 2022, Lofgren pulled his music from Spotify, after Neil Young and Joni Mitchell had done the same. This was in response to their belief that COVID-19 misinformation was spread by the streaming service's The Joe Rogan Experience.

== Musical equipment ==
Lofgren primarily uses a variety of Fender guitars and amplifiers.

=== Guitars ===
- Fender Stratocaster – Including two 1961 models which he often uses. (Reissues on tour).
- Fender Jazzmaster
- Gibson Les Paul – 1952 Goldtop.
- Gibson Flying V – Used during Grin's reunion tour in 2001.
- B.C. Rich Mockingbird
- Epiphone Les Paul – Used on tours with Ringo Starr.
- Martin D-18 – Given to Lofgren by Neil Young.
- Gretsch Black Penguin
- Gretsch Black Falcon
- Gibson Les Paul – 1952 goldtop, with Bigsby vibrato tailpiece
- Gibson L-10 acoustic
- Spector ARC6
- Takamine acoustic guitars
- Owens/Zeta resonator guitars
- Carter pedal steel guitars

=== Effects ===
- Barber Burn Unit overdrive
- Strymon Brigadier dBucket Delay
- TC Electronic ND-1 Nova Delay

=== Amplifiers ===
- Fuchs 4 Aces 112 combo

With The E Street Band.

=== Effects ===
- Vocoder
- Electro-Harmonix POG
- Barber Burn Unit overdrives
- Fulltone Full-Dive 2
- Line 6 DL4 delay
- DigiTech Whammy
- Digital Music GCX audio switcher
- Furman power conditioner
- Line 6 Pod Pro
- BOSS OC-3
- BOSS DD-3
- Korg DTR tuner
- Peterson AutoStrobe 490
- Voodoo Lab Ground Control

=== Amplifiers ===
- Fender Twin Reverbs – Used most recently.
- Fender blackface Super Reverbs – With four 10" speakers.
- Fender Hot Rod Deluxe
- Fender Vibro Kings – With three 10" speakers'
- Fender Vibro King Custom
- Fender Hot Rod DeVilles
- Fuchs ODS 50 -used at 2012 Grammys

== Discography ==
=== Grin discography ===
- 1971: Grin (Spindizzy/Epic)
- 1972: 1+1 (Spindizzy/Epic)
- 1973: All Out (Spindizzy/Epic)
- 1973: Gone Crazy (A&M)

=== Solo discography ===
Year	Album	Peak chart positions							
Year	Album	AUS	CAN	GER	NL	SWE	UK	US	US Ind
1975	Nils Lofgren (A&M)	—	—	—	—	—	—	141	—
1975	Back It Up!! (Live) (A&M)	—	—	—	—	—	—	—	—
1976	Cry Tough (A&M)	96	57	—	12	22	8	32	—
1977	I Came to Dance (A&M)	—	81	—	—	14	30	36	—
1977	Night After Night (Live) (A&M)	—	75	—	—	23	38	44	—
1979	Nils (A&M)	73	85	21	50	35	—	54	—
1981	Night Fades Away (Backstreet/MCA)	92	—	—	—	22	50	99	—
1981	Best of Nils Lofgren (A&M)	—	—	—	—	—	—	—	—
1982	A Rhythm Romance (A&M)	—	—	—	—	—	100	—	—
1983	Wonderland (Backstreet/MCA)	—	—	—	—	31	—	206	—
1985	Flip (CBS)	—	—	—	—	12	36	150	—
1986	Code of the Road (Live) (Towerbell/CBS)	—	—	—	—	—	86	—	—
1991	Silver Lining (Rykodisc)	122	—	—	62	—	61	153	—
1992	Crooked Line (Rykodisc)	—	—	—	—	—	—	—	—
1993	Live on the Test (Windsong) (UK-only release)	—	—	—	—	—	—	—	—
1994	Every Breath (Soundtrack) (Crisis)	—	—	—	—	—	—	—	—
1995	Damaged Goods (Pure)	—	—	—	—	—	—	—	—
1997	Acoustic Live (Vision)	—	—	—	—	—	—	—	—
2001	Breakaway Angel (Vision)	—	—	—	—	—	—	—	—
2002	Tuff Stuff: The Best of the All-Madden Team Band (Vision)	—	—	—	—	—	—	—	—
2003	Nils Lofgren Band Live (Vision)	—	—	—	—	—	—	—	—
2006	Sacred Weapon (Vision)	—	—	—	—	—	—	—	—
2008	The Loner – Nils Sings Neil (Vision)	—	—	—	—	—	—	—	—
2011	Old School (MvD)	—	—	—	—	60	—	—	—
2014	Face the Music (box set) (Fantasy)	—	—	—	—	—	—	—	—
2015	UK 2015 Face the Music Tour (Cattle Track Road)	—	—	—	—	—	—	—	—
2019	Blue with Lou (Cattle Track Road)	—	—	—	—	—	—	—	33
2020	Weathered (Live) (Cattle Track Road)	—	—	—	—	—	—	—	—
2023	Mountains (Cattle Track Road)	—	—	85	—	—	—	—	—
"—" denotes releases that did not chart or were not released

=== With Crazy Horse ===
- Crazy Horse (1971)
- All Roads Lead Home (2023) (released under the name Molina, Talbot, Lofgren and Young)

=== With Neil Young ===
- After the Gold Rush (1970)
- Tonight's the Night (1975)
- Trans (1982)
- In Berlin (1983)
- Unplugged (February 1993)
- Roxy: Tonight's the Night Live (2018) Recorded in (1973)
- Colorado (2019) (with Crazy Horse)
- Barn (2021) (with Crazy Horse)
- World Record (2022) (with Crazy Horse)
- Somewhere Under the Rainbow (2023) Recorded in 1973 (with the Santa Monica Flyers)

=== With Jerry Williams ===
- Jerry Williams (Spindizzy) (1972) – Lofgren/Grin played on three songs on the album; additionally, they played on the b-side of the single, "Crazy 'Bout You Baby"

=== With Lou Reed (as co-writer) ===
- The Bells (1979)

=== With Bruce Springsteen and the E Street Band ===
- Live/1975-85 (1986)
- Tunnel of Love (1987)
- Chimes of Freedom (1988)
- Greatest Hits (1995)
- Blood Brothers (1996)
- Tracks (1998)
- 18 Tracks (1999)
- Bruce Springsteen & The E Street Band: Live in New York City (2001)
- The Rising (2002)
- The Essential Bruce Springsteen (2003)
- Magic (2007)
- Magic Tour Highlights (2008)
- Bruce Springsteen & The E Street Band Greatest Hits (2009)
- Working on a Dream (2009)
- Wrecking Ball (2012)
- Collection: 1973–2012 (2013)
- High Hopes (2014)
- American Beauty (2014)
- Bruce Springsteen Archives (2014–present)
- Chapter and Verse (2016)
- The Live Series: Songs of the Road (2018)
- The Live Series: Songs of Friendship (2019)
- The Live Series: Songs of Hope (2019)
- Letter to You (2020)

=== With Lou Gramm ===
- Ready or Not (1987)
