= Ted Nugent discography =

Cataloguing of published recordings by Ted Nugent

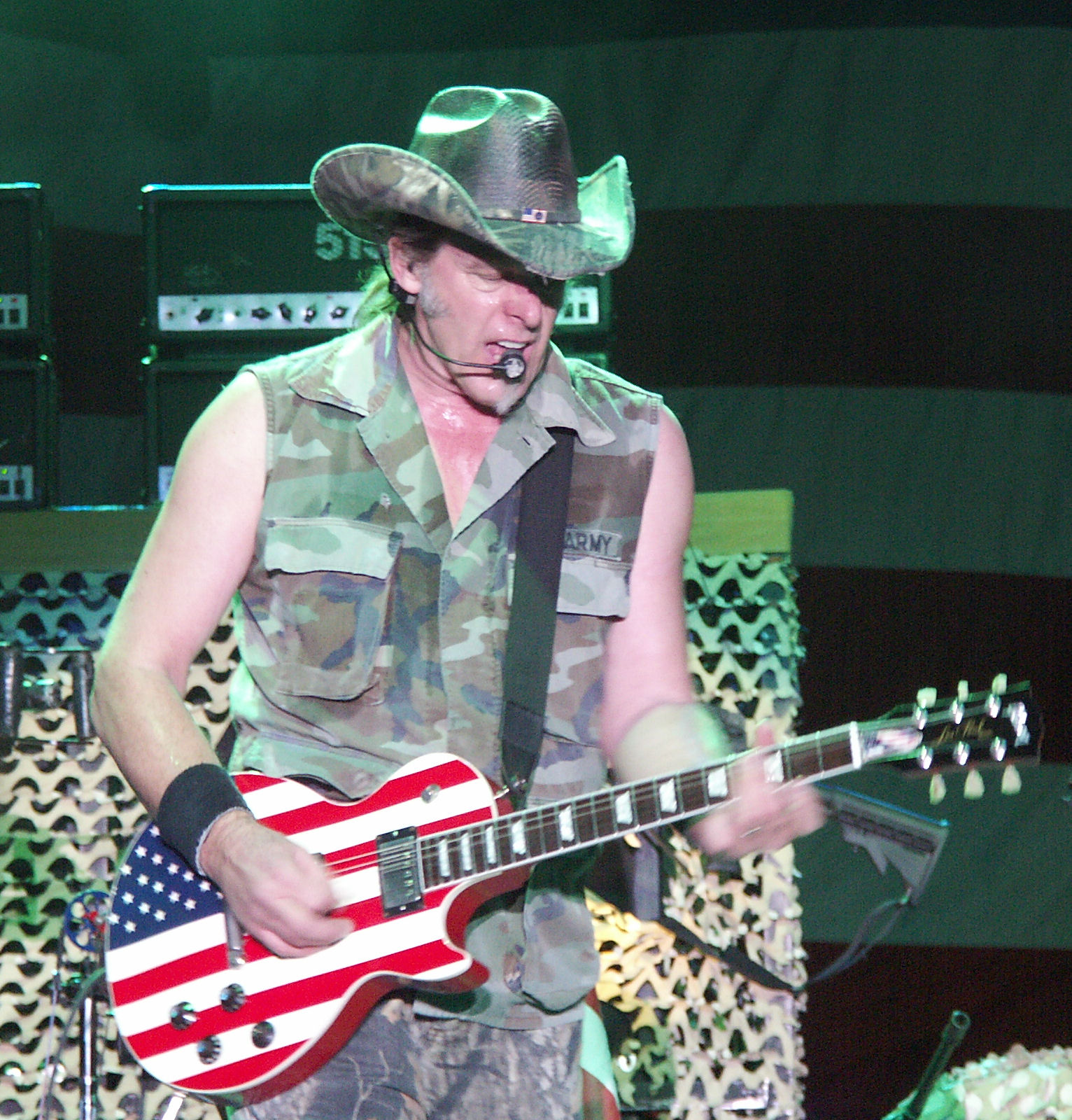
- Nugent performing in 2007
- Studio albums: 16
- Live albums: 8
- Compilation albums: 16
- Singles: 20

This article lists the solo discography of American guitarist Ted Nugent.

== Albums ==
=== Studio albums ===
Year	Album details	Peak chart positions						Certifications (sales threshold)
Year	Album details	US	US Indie	AUS	CAN	SWE	UK	Certifications (sales threshold)
1975	Ted Nugent: Release date: September 1975 (US) March 1976 (UK); Label: Epic Records	28	—	37	—	—	56	US: 2× Platinum; CAN: Gold
1976	Free-for-All: Release date: September 1976; Label: Epic Records	24	—	84	31	14	33	US: 2× Platinum; CAN: Gold
1977	Cat Scratch Fever: Release date: June 1977; Label: Epic Records	17	—	90	25	14	28	US: 3× Platinum; CAN: Platinum
1978	Weekend Warriors: Release date: November 1978; Label: Epic Records	24	—	44	22	—	—	US: Platinum; CAN: Platinum
1979	State of Shock: Release date: May 1979; Label: Epic Records	18	—	57	18	—	—	US: Gold; CAN: Gold
1980	Scream Dream: Release date: May 1980; Label: Epic Records	13	—	—	26	—	37	US: Gold; CAN: Gold
1982	Nugent: Release date: July 1982; Label: Atlantic Records	51	—	—	—	—	—	
1984	Penetrator: Release date: February 1984; Label: Atlantic Records	56	—	—	—	—	—	
1986	Little Miss Dangerous: Release date: March 1986; Label: Atlantic Records	76	—	—	89	—	—	
1988	If You Can't Lick 'Em... Lick 'Em: Release date: February 1988; Label: Atlantic Records	112	—	—	—	—	—	
1995	Spirit of the Wild: Release date: April 25, 1995; Label: Atlantic Records	86	—	—	—	—	—	
2002	Craveman: Release date: September 24, 2002; Label: Spitfire Records	—	20	—	—	—	—	
2007	Love Grenade: Release date: September 4, 2007; Label: Eagle Records	186	22	—	—	—	—	
2014	Shutup & Jam!: Release date: July 8, 2014; Label: Frontiers Records	102	—	—	—	—	—	
2018	The Music Made Me Do It: Release date: November 9, 2018; Label: Round Hill Music	— (Note: The Music Made Me Do It reached number 89 on Billboard's United States Top Current Albums chart, and never entered the magazine's actual US Top 200 album chart, which also counts catalog albums.)	24	—	—	—	—	
2022	Detroit Muscle: Release date: April 29, 2022; Label: Pavement Music	—	—	—	—	—	—	
"—" denotes releases that did not chart

=== Live albums ===
Year	Album details	Peak chart positions				Certifications (sales threshold)
Year	Album details	US	CAN	SWE	UK	Certifications (sales threshold)
1978	Double Live Gonzo!: Release date: February 1978; Label: Epic Records	13	11	24	47	US: 3× Platinum; CAN: Gold
1981	Intensities in 10 Cities: Release date: March 2, 1981; Label: Epic Records	51	17	—	75	
1997	Live at Hammersmith '79: Release date: March 11, 1997; Label: Sony Records	—	—	—	—	
2001	Full Bluntal Nugity: Release date: June 11, 2001; Label: Spitfire Records	—	—	—	—	
2005	Extended Versions: Release date: September 27, 2005; Label: Sony BMG	—	—	—	—	
2008	Sweden Rocks: Release date: 2008/05/13; Recorded: 2006; Label: Eagle Rock Records	—	—	—	—	
2009	Motor City Mayhem: Release date: 2009/06/30; Recorded: 2008/07/04; Label: Eagle Rock Records	—	—	—	—	
2013	Ultralive Ballisticrock: Release date: 2013/10/22; Recorded: 2011/08/14	_	_	_	_	
"—" denotes releases that did not chart

=== Compilation albums ===
Year	Album details	Peak positions	Certifications (sales threshold)
Year	Album details	US	Certifications (sales threshold)
1981	Great Gonzos! The Best of Ted Nugent: Release date: November 6, 1981; Label: Epic/Legacy Records	140	US: 2× Platinum
1986	Anthology: Release Date: 1986; Label: Castle Communications (France)		
1993	Out of Control: Release date: June 22, 1993; Label: Epic/Legacy Records	—	
1996	Motor City Madness: Release date: May 13, 1996; Label: Sony Music Special Products	—	
1996	Over The Top: Release date: August 6, 1996; Label: Sony Music Distribution	—	
1998	Super Hits: Release date: January 27, 1998; Label: Sony Music Distribution	—	
2002	The Ultimate Ted Nugent: Release date: March 26, 2002; Label: Epic/Legacy Records	—	
2001	Noble Savage: Release date: December 11, 2001; Label: Recall	—	
2002	Take Two: Release date: April 1, 2002; Label: Sony Music Distribution	—	
2003	20 Hits: Release date: May 6, 2003; Label: Platinum Disc	—	
2003	Take No Prisoners: Release date: June 24, 2003; Label: Sony Music Distribution	—	
2004	Hunt Music: Release date: June 1, 2004; Label: Broadhead Music	—	
2004	Decades of Destruction: Release date: September 14, 2004; Label: Bizarre Planet Entertainment	—	
2005	Extended Versions: Release date: September 27, 2005; Label: BMG Special Products / Sony BMG	—	
2009	Playlist: The Very Best of Ted Nugent: Release date: March 31, 2009; Label: Epic/Legacy Records	—	
2010	Happy Defiance Day Everyday: Release date: July 4, 2010; Label: Eagle Rock (US) / Eagle Records	—	
"—" denotes releases that did not chart

== Music videos ==
List of music videos
Title	Year
"Just What The Doctor Ordered"	1975
"Wang Dang Sweet Poontang"	1977
"Sweet Sally"	1977
"Scream Dream"	1980
"Wango Tango"	1980
"Land Of A Thousand Dances"	1981
"Heads Will Roll"	1981
"Tied Up In Love"	1984
"Little Miss Dangerous"	1986
"She Drives Me Crazy"	1988
"That's The Story Of Love	1988
"Crave"	2002
"Everything Matters"	2014
"Shutup & Jam"	2014
"The Music Made Me Do It"	2018

== Lyric videos ==
List of Lyrics videos
Title	Year
"Come And Take It"	2021
"American Camp Fire"	2022
"Born In The Motorcity"	2022

== Singles ==
This section includes only singles that were released in the U.S. and Canada.

Year	Single	Chart positions			Album
Year	Single	US	US Rock	CAN	Album
1975	"Where Have You Been All My Life"	—	—	—	Ted Nugent
1976	"Hey Baby"	72	—	—	Ted Nugent
1976	"Dog Eat Dog"	91	—	73	Free-for-All
1977	"Free-for-All"	—	—	—	Free-for-All
1977	"Cat Scratch Fever"	30	—	37	Cat Scratch Fever
1977	"Home Bound"	70	—	—	Cat Scratch Fever
1978	"Yank Me, Crank Me"	58	—	56	Double Live Gonzo
1978	"Need You Bad"	84	—	82	Weekend Warriors
1979	"I Want to Tell You"	—	—	—	State of Shock
1980	"Wango Tango"	86	—	—	Scream Dream
1981	"Land of a Thousand Dances"	—	47	—	Intensities in 10 Cities
1981	"Jailbait" [airplay]	—	56	—	Intensities in 10 Cities
1981	"The Flying Lip Lock" [airplay]	—	36	—	Intensities in 10 Cities
1982	"Bound and Gagged"	—	—	—	Nugent
1982	"No No No"	—	—	—	Nugent
1984	"Tied Up in Love"	—	41	—	Penetrator
1984	"(Where Do You) Draw the Line"	—	—	—	Penetrator
1986	"High Heels in Motion"	—	—	—	Little Miss Dangerous
1986	"Little Miss Dangerous"	—	22	—	Little Miss Dangerous
1988	"She Drives Me Crazy"	—	—	—	If You Can't Lick 'Em... Lick 'Em
