= The Ultimate Ted Nugent =

Greatest hits album by Ted Nugent
- Released: March 26, 2002; October 25, 2010 (as The Essential Ted Nugent)
- Recorded: 1975–1981
- Genre: Hard rock
- Length: 136:02
- Label: Epic/Legacy
- Producer: Bruce Dickinson

Ted Nugent chronology
Full Bluntal Nugity (live) (2001)	The Ultimate Ted Nugent (2002)	Hunt Music (2004)

Professional ratings
Review scores
Source	Rating
Allmusic	3/5 stars

The Ultimate Ted Nugent is a greatest hits album by Ted Nugent released in 2002. In 2010, the album was reissued under the title The Essential Ted Nugent, as a part of Sony Music's The Essential series.

== Track listing ==
=== Disc one ===
1. "Stranglehold" – 8:23 (from the album Ted Nugent, 1975)
2. "Stormtroopin'" – 3:09 (from the album Ted Nugent, 1975)
3. "Hey Baby" – 4:00 (from the album Ted Nugent, 1975)
4. "Just What the Doctor Ordered" – 3:45 (from the album Ted Nugent, 1975)
5. "Snakeskin Cowboys" – 4:34 (from the album Ted Nugent, 1975)
6. "Motor City Madhouse" – 4:33 (from the album Ted Nugent, 1975)
7. "Where Have You Been All My Life" – 4:05 (from the album Ted Nugent, 1975)
8. "Free-for-All" – 3:22 (from the album Free-for-All, 1976)
9. "Dog Eat Dog" – 4:03 (from the album Free-for-All, 1976)
10. "Writing on the Wall" – 7:11 (from the album Free-for-All, 1976)
11. "Turn It Up" – 3:38 (from the album Free-for-All, 1976)
12. "Street Rats" – 3:37 (from the album Free-for-All, 1976)
13. "Hammerdown" – 4:09 (from the album Free-for-All, 1976)
14. "Cat Scratch Fever" – 3:39 (from the album Cat Scratch Fever, 1977)
15. "Wang Dang Sweet Poontang" – 3:16 (from the album Cat Scratch Fever, 1977)
16. "Death by Misadventure" – 3:29 (from the album Cat Scratch Fever, 1977)
- Rob Grange appears on Tracks 1, 2, 3, 4, 5, 6, 7, 8, 10, 11, 12, 13, 14, 15 and 16

=== Disc two ===
1. "Out of Control" – 3:28 (from the album Cat Scratch Fever, 1977)
2. "Live It Up" – 4:00 (from the album Cat Scratch Fever, 1977)
3. "Home Bound" – 4:44 (from the album Cat Scratch Fever, 1977)
4. "Need You Bad" – 4:19 (from the album Weekend Warriors, 1978)
5. "Weekend Warriors" – 3:08 (from the album Weekend Warriors, 1978)
6. "Smokescreen" – 4:14 (from the album Weekend Warriors, 1978)
7. "Paralyzed" – 4:11 (from the album State of Shock, 1979)
8. "Take It or Leave It" – 4:08 (from the album State of Shock, 1979)
9. "State of Shock" – 3:23 (from the album State of Shock, 1979)
10. "Snake Charmer" – 3:20 (from the album State of Shock, 1979)
11. "Wango Tango" – 4:51 (from the album Scream Dream, 1980)
12. "Scream Dream" – 3:19 (from the album Scream Dream, 1980)
13. "Jailbait" (live) – 5:20 (from the album Intensities in 10 Cities, 1981)
14. "Yank Me, Crank Me" (live) – 4:35 (from the album Double Live Gonzo!, 1978)
15. "The Flying Lip Lock" (live) – 4:11 (from the album Intensities in 10 Cities, 1981)
16. "Baby, Please Don't Go" (live) – 5:58 (from the album Double Live Gonzo!, 1978)
- Rob Grange appears on Tracks 1, 2, 3, 14 and 16
