= Out of Control (Ted Nugent album) =

Compilation album by Ted Nugent
- Released: June 22, 1993
- Genre: Hard rock
- Length: 143:59
- Label: Epic / Legacy

Ted Nugent chronology
If You Can't Lick 'Em...Lick 'Em (1988)	Out of Control (1993)	Spirit of the Wild (1995)

Professional ratings
Review scores
Source	Rating
Allmusic	4.5/5 stars

Out of Control is a comprehensive double-disc set containing 34 songs from all stages of Ted Nugent's career, including tracks from his previous group The Amboy Dukes.

== Track listing ==
=== CD 1 ===
1. "Baby, Please Don't Go" - 5:38
2. "Journey to the Center of the Mind" - 3:34
3. "You Talk Sunshine, I Breathe Fire" - 2:43
4. "Gloria" (previously unreleased) - 6:07 (It was disputed by Nugent on 102.7 WWBR as not done by The Amboy Dukes)
5. "Call of the Wild" - 4:46
6. "Great White Buffalo" - 4:57
7. "Stranglehold" - 8:22
8. "Stormtroopin'" - 3:04
9. "Hey Baby" - 3:59
10. "Motor City Madhouse" - 4:33
11. "Free-for-All" - 3:20
12. "Dog Eat Dog" - 4:03
13. "Turn It Up" - 3:36
14. "Street Rats" (alternate version with Derek St. Holmes) - 4:14
15. "Magic Party" (previously unreleased) - 2:42
16. "Hammerdown" - 4:07
- Rob Grange appears on Tracks 1, 5, 6, 7, 8, 9, 10, 11, 14, 15 and 16

=== CD 2 ===
1. "Cat Scratch Fever" - 3:38
2. "Wang Dang Sweet Poontang" - 3:15
3. "Live It Up" - 3:59
4. "Home Bound" - 4:43
5. "Out of Control" - 3:27
6. "Carol" (live) - 4:02
7. "Just What the Doctor Ordered" (live) - 5:27
8. "Yank Me, Crank Me" (live) - 4:42
9. "Walking Tall" (live) - 3:53
10. "Need You Bad" - 4:17
11. "Weekend Warriors" - 3:05
12. "Paralyzed" - 4:01
13. "State of Shock" - 3:21
14. "Wango Tango" - 4:48
15. "Scream Dream" - 3:18
16. "Terminus Eldorado" - 4:14
17. "Jailbait" (live) - 5:16
18. "Little Miss Dangerous" - 4:48
- Rob Grange appears on Tracks 1, 2, 3, 4, 5, 7 and 8
- John Sauter appears on Tracks 2, 3, 4, 5, 6, 7, 8, 9, 10, and 11
