= Playlist: The Very Best of Ted Nugent =

Compilation album by Ted Nugent
- Released: March 2009
- Recorded: 1975–1980
- Genre: Hard rock
- Length: 62:51
- Label: Epic/Legacy

Ted Nugent chronology
Sweden Rocks (2008)	Playlist: The Very Best of Ted Nugent (2009)	Motor City Mayhem (2009)

Professional ratings
Review scores
Source	Rating
AllMusic	4/5 stars

Playlist: The Very Best of Ted Nugent is a 2009 compilation album by American hard rock musician Ted Nugent. It is one of the titles in the Playlist album series.

AllMusic reviewer James Christopher Monger praised the album, remarking that it included some of Nugent's "strip club classics".

== Track listing ==
All songs by Ted Nugent, except where indicated.

1. "Great White Buffalo" (Live) – 6:25
2. "Cat Scratch Fever" – 3:40
3. "Wango Tango" – 4:50
4. "Stranglehold" – 8:24
5. "Wang Dang Sweet Poontang" – 3:16
6. "Free-for-All" – 3:23
7. "Dog Eat Dog" – 4:05
8. "Scream Dream" – 3:20
9. "Weekend Warriors" – 3:09
10. "Baby, Please Don't Go" (Live) (Big Joe Williams) – 6:00
11. "Snakeskin Cowboys" – 4:35
12. "Live It Up" (Nugent, Derek St. Holmes) – 4:00
13. "Smokescreen" – 4:15
14. "Out of Control" – 3:29
- Rob Grange appears on tracks 1, 2, 3, 4, 5, 6, 10, 11, 12 and 14

== See also ==
- 2009 in music
- Great Gonzos!
- Playlist compilation albums
