= Sweden Rocks =

2006 live album by Ted Nugent

Live album by Ted Nugent
- Released: 13 May 2008
- Recorded: Sweden Rock Festival, Norje, Sweden, 10 June 2006
- Genre: Hard rock
- Length: 68:25
- Label: Eagle

Ted Nugent chronology
Love Grenade (2007)	Sweden Rocks (2008)	Motor City Mayhem (2009)

Sweden Rocks

Video by Ted Nugent
- Released: 10 June 2008
- Recorded: Sweden Rock Festival, Norje, Sweden, 10 June 2006
- Genre: Hard rock
- Length: 117 min.
- Label: Eagle Vision
- Producer: Sean McEneely, Mike Carden

Ted Nugent chronology
Full Bluntal Nugity (2003)	Sweden Rocks (2008)

Professional ratings
Review scores
Source	Rating
AllMusic	(DVD)

Sweden Rocks is a 2006 live album by the American hard rock guitarist Ted Nugent, recorded at the Sweden Rock Festival in 2006. It was also released at the same time as a live DVD. Bassist Barry Sparks would depart Nugent's band shortly after, at which time Greg Smith took over.

This performance was a rare occasion where Nugent used his white Gibson Byrdland, affectionately named the Great White Buffalo, for songs other than GWB.

== Track listing ==
All songs written by Ted Nugent, except where noted.

1. "Stormtroopin'" – 3:39
2. "Wango Tango" – 5:50
3. "Snakeskin Cowboys" – 6:14
4. "Free-for-All" – 3:55
5. "Wang Dang Sweet Poontang" – 8:15
6. "Rawdogs & Warhogs" – 3:53
7. "Soul Man" (Isaac Hayes, David Porter) – 1:22
8. "Hey Baby" (Derek St. Holmes) – 4:29
9. "Dog Eat Dog" – 4:30
10. "Still Raising Hell" – 3:20
11. "Cat Scratch Fever" – 4:37
12. "Stranglehold" – 9:55
13. "Great White Buffalo" – 8:26

== DVD track listing ==
1. "Stormtroopin'"
2. "Wango Tango"
3. "Snakeskin Cowboys"
4. "Free for All"
5. "Wang Dang Sweet Poontang"
6. "Klstrphnky"
7. "Raw Dogs & War Hogs"
8. "Soul Man"
9. "Hey Baby"
10. "Dog Eat Dog"
11. "Still Raising Hell"
12. "Motor City Madhouse"
13. "Cat Scratch Fever"
14. "Stranglehold"
15. "Great White Buffalo"

Bonus Material

Live 2007

1. "Journey to the Center of the Mind"
2. "Weekend Warriors"
3. "Love Grenade"
- Interview with Barry Sparks and Tommy Clufetos
- Bow Hunting with Ted
- Ted on the Gun Range

== Personnel ==
- Ted Nugent – guitars, vocals
- Barry Sparks – bass, backing vocals, lead vocals on "Hey Baby"
- Mick Brown – drums, backing vocals
