= Great Gonzos! The Best of Ted Nugent =

1981 compilation album by Ted Nugent

Greatest hits album by Ted Nugent
- Released: 6 November 1981
- Recorded: 1975–1980
- Genre: Hard rock
- Length: 49:05
- Label: Epic

Ted Nugent chronology
Intensities in 10 Cities (1981)	Great Gonzos! The Best of Ted Nugent (1981)	Nugent (1982)

Professional ratings
Review scores
Source	Rating
AllMusic	4.5/5 stars
Robert Christgau	(B+)

Great Gonzos! The Best of Ted Nugent is the first compilation album by American rock musician Ted Nugent, collecting his best-known tracks from his time with Epic Records. The album was originally released in 1981 with ten tracks and reissued in 1999 with three bonus tracks.

== Track listing ==
All songs written by Ted Nugent, except "Baby, Please Don't Go" by Big Joe Williams and "Give Me Just a Little" by Nugent, Neal Schon, Tommy Shaw and Jack Blades

1. "Cat Scratch Fever" – 3:39 (from the 1977 album Cat Scratch Fever)
2. "Just What the Doctor Ordered" – 3:42 (from the 1975 album Ted Nugent)
3. "Free-for-All" – 3:21 (from the 1976 album Free-for-All)
4. "Dog Eat Dog" – 4:03 (from the 1976 album Free-for-All)
5. "Motor City Madhouse" – 4:27 (from the 1975 album Ted Nugent)
6. "Paralyzed" – 4:11 (from the 1979 album State of Shock)
7. "Stranglehold" – 8:24 (from the 1975 album Ted Nugent)
8. "Baby, Please Don't Go" (live) – 5:58 (from the 1978 live album Double Live Gonzo!)
9. "Wango Tango" – 4:49 (from the 1980 album Scream Dream)
10. "Wang Dang Sweet Poontang (live) – 6:27 (from the 1978 live album Double Live Gonzo!)
- Rob Grange appears on Tracks 1, 2, 3, 5, 7, 8, 9 and 10

=== 1999 CD reissue bonus tracks ===
11. "Yank Me, Crank Me" (live) – 4:39 (from the 1978 live album Double Live Gonzo!)
12. "Home Bound" – 4:41 (from the 1977 album Cat Scratch Fever)
13. "Give Me Just a Little" – 3:48 (newly recorded in 1999 for the purposes of this reissue)
- Rob Grange appears on Tracks 11 and 12

== Charts ==
Chart (1981)	Peak position
US Billboard 200	140

== Certifications ==
Region	Certification	Certified units/sales
United States (RIAA)	2× Platinum	2,000,000^{^}
^{^} Shipments figures based on certification alone.
