= Live at Hammersmith '79 =

Live album by Ted Nugent
- Released: March 11, 1997
- Recorded: May 9, 1979
- Venue: Hammersmith Odeon, London, UK
- Genre: Hard rock
- Length: 73:31
- Label: Epic / Legacy
- Producer: Lew Futterman, Bob Irwin

Ted Nugent chronology
Spirit of the Wild (1995)	Live at Hammersmith '79 (1997)	Full Bluntal Nugity (2001)

Professional ratings
Review scores
Source	Rating
AllMusic	4/5 stars
Collector's Guide to Heavy Metal	7/10

Live at Hammersmith '79 is a live album by American rock musician Ted Nugent, consisting of a performance originally broadcast on the King Biscuit Flower Hour, recorded during the second set of a sold-out night at London's Hammersmith Odeon in 1979 and not released until 1997.

== Track listing ==
1. "Stormtroopin'" – 5:57
2. "Just What the Doctor Ordered" – 4:57
3. "Free-for-All" – 8:17
4. "Dog Eat Dog" – 5:52
5. "Cat Scratch Fever" – 4:08
6. "Need You Bad" – 5:17
7. "Paralyzed" – 5:03
8. "It Don't Matter" – 3:19
9. "Wang Dang Sweet Poontang" – 8:05
10. "Stranglehold/Smokescreen" – 10:29
11. "Motor City Madhouse" – 10:10
12. "Gonzo" – 3:57

== Personnel ==
Band members

- Ted Nugent – guitar, percussion, vocals
- Charlie Huhn – guitar, vocals
- Steve McRay – keyboards
- Dave Kiswiney – bass
- Cliff Davies – drums, background vocals
- Tom Werman – percussion

Production

- Bob Irwin – producer
- Lew Futterman – original recording producer
- Tim Geelan – mixing
- Vic Anesini – mastering
