= Full Bluntal Nugity =

Live album by Ted Nugent

Live album by Ted Nugent
- Released: June 5, 2001
- Recorded: December 31, 2000
- Venue: The palace of Auburn Hills, Auburn Hills, Michigan
- Genre: Hard rock
- Length: 67:54
- Label: Spitfire
- Producer: Ted Nugent, Drew Peters, Chris Peters

Ted Nugent chronology
Live at Hammersmith '79 (1997)	Full Bluntal Nugity (2001)	Craveman (2002)

Full Bluntal Nugity

Video by Ted Nugent
- Released: 25 March 2003
- Recorded: December 31, 2000
- Venue: Whiplash Bash, Detroit, Michigan
- Genre: Hard rock
- Length: 175 min.
- Label: Eagle Rock Entertainment

Professional ratings
Review scores
Source	Rating
AllMusic	(DVD)
Classic Rock	6/10 stars

Full Bluntal Nugity is a live album by the American hard rock guitarist Ted Nugent, recorded on New Year's Eve (12/31/2000) at Ted Nugent's annual Whiplash Bash in Detroit, MI. A live DVD with the same title was released in 2003 by Eagle Rock Entertainment.

== CD Track listing ==
1. "KLSTRPHK" (instrumental) – 3:59
2. "Paralyzed" – 4:27
3. "Snakeskin Cowboys" – 5:58
4. "Wang Dang Sweet Poontang" – 6:43
5. "Free-for-All" – 4:10
6. "Yank Me, Crank Me" – 2:43
7. "Hey Baby" – 4:12
8. "Fred Bear" (acoustic) – 8:11
9. "Cat Scratch Fever" – 5:26
10. "Stranglehold" – 9:47
11. "Great White Buffalo" – 5:20
12. "Motor City Madhouse" – 6:58

== DVD Track Listing ==
=== Main Program ===
1. "Intro"
2. "Great Nuge Buffalo"*
3. "Paralyzed"
4. "Stormtroopin'"
5. "Nuzenoizcheck"**
6. "Snakeskin Cowboyz"
7. "Nuge Gear Abuse"**
8. "Free For All"
9. "Hey Baby"
10. "Nugeradio"**
11. "Wang, Dang, Sweet Poontang"
12. "Nuge Manager-Doug Banker and Supansa Wedding"**
13. "Kiss My Ass"
14. "Full Uzinage"**
15. "Yank Me, Crank Me"
16. "Spirit W/ Garlic, Butter & Gutpiles"**
17. "Dog Eat Dog"
18. "Cat Scratch Fever"
19. "Derek St. Holmes La Jam"**
20. "Stranglehold"
21. "Motor City Madhouse"
22. "Buffalo Entrance II"*
23. "Fred Bear"
24. "Outro/Credits"
25. "tednugent.com"
- = Ted on stage before song
  - = Backstage footage

=== Bonus Features ===
1. Interactive Ted Nugent Commentary
2. "Journey To The Center Of The Mind" bonus 1967 performance
3. 5 vintage performances of "Free For All", "Wang, Dang, Sweet Poontang", "Cat Scratch Fever", "Motor City Madhouse", and "Fred Bear" from various tours from 1978, 1980, and 2000
4. "Crave" music video
5. Ted Nugent Discography
6. tednugent.com video links

== Personnel ==
Band members

- Ted Nugent – guitars, vocals, producer, mixing
- Marco Mendoza – bass, backing vocals, lead vocals on "Hey Baby"
- Tommy Aldridge – drums, backing vocals (on live album)
- Tommy Clufetos – drums, backing vocals (on DVD)

Production

- Chris Peters – producer
- Drew Peters – producer, mixing
- Joel Singer – engineer
- Ben Began – mixing
- Joe Lambert – mastering
- Peter Tsakiris – art direction, design
- Rob Alford – photography
- Sherrie Buzby – photography, tray card
- Michael Wheeler – photo imaging
