= The Music Made Me Do It =

Studio album by Ted Nugent
- Released: November 9, 2018
- Genre: Hard rock, blues rock
- Length: 37:26
- Label: Round Hill

Ted Nugent chronology
Shutup & Jam! (2014)	The Music Made Me Do It (2018)	Detroit Muscle (2022)

The Music Made Me Do It is the fifteenth studio album by American rock musician Ted Nugent. It was released on November 9, 2018, through Round Hill Records. It is the first album to feature drummer Jason Hartless.

Nugent remarked in an October 2018 interview that he thought fans "would like" the album's content. Describing the albums' musical style, he proclaimed the record to be "real rhythm and blues Rock & Roll".

== Track listing ==
All tracks written by Ted Nugent.

1. "The Music Made Me Do It"
2. "Where Ya Gonna Run to Get Away from Yourself"
3. "Cocked, Locked & Ready to Rock"
4. "BigFunDirtyGrooveNoize"
5. "I Love You Too Much Baby"
6. "BackStrap Fever" (Note: Written to the tune of "Cat Scratch Fever")
7. "I Just Wanna Go Huntin"
8. "Fred Bear (Acoustic)"
9. "Sunrize"
10. "Sunrize (Fender Bass VI Solo)"

== Personnel ==
- Ted Nugent – guitars, vocals, six-string bass on "Sunrize (Fender Bass VI Solo)"
- Greg Smith – bass
- Jason Hartless – drums
- 3 Coneys and a Slice – backing vocals

== Charts ==
Chart (2018)	Peak position
US Independent Albums (Billboard)	24
