= St. Paradise =

Studio album by St. Paradise
- Released: 1979
- Studios: Sea-West Studios, Seattle, Washington
- Genre: Hard rock
- Length: 36:00
- Label: Warner Bros.
- Producer: Mike Flicker

St. Paradise is the only studio album by American hard rock band St. Paradise, released in 1979 by Warner Bros. Records. Formed by former Ted Nugent band members Derek St. Holmes and Rob Grange with drummer Denny Carmassi of Montrose, the group recorded the album with producer Mike Flicker at Seattle's Sea-West Studios. Although the album attracted favorable reviews and the band toured in support of Van Halen, it achieved limited commercial success and remained the group's only release.

== Background ==
St. Paradise was formed in 1978 by vocalist and guitarist Derek St. Holmes and bassist Rob Grange following their departure from Ted Nugent's band. According to Grange, the pair had become dissatisfied with their role in the organization and sought a more collaborative musical environment. They recruited drummer Denny Carmassi, whom Grange and St. Holmes had come to know through touring with Nugent and Montrose.

Grange later stated that he and St. Holmes had written extensively while members of Nugent's band, developing material in hotel rooms, backstage areas, and during soundchecks. Much of this material had not been used by Nugent and later formed the basis of the St. Paradise album. Grange estimated that the pair had accumulated enough material for several albums by the time the new group was formed.

The band initially intended to perform under the name Paradise but adopted the name St. Paradise after discovering that another group was already using the original name. The revised name incorporated St. Holmes's surname. Before securing a recording contract, the trio rehearsed in Atlanta and recorded demonstration tapes at Bearsville Studios, which helped obtain a deal with Warner Bros. Records.

== Recording ==
After securing a contract with Warner Bros. Records, St. Paradise began work on its debut album with producer Mike Flicker. According to bassist Rob Grange, the band had initially hoped to work with producers such as Eddie Kramer, Jack Douglas, Roy Thomas Baker, Jeff Glixman, or David Krebs, but ultimately chose Flicker, who had achieved commercial success producing Heart. The album was recorded at Sea-West Studios in Seattle, Washington.

Much of the material had been written prior to the band's formation. Grange and vocalist Derek St. Holmes later recalled developing songs while members of Ted Nugent's touring band and continuing to refine the material during rehearsals in Atlanta. The group also recorded demonstration tapes at Bearsville Studios before entering Sea-West Studios to record the album. The album also featured a re-recording of "Live It Up", which had previously appeared on Ted Nugent's Cat Scratch Fever (1978) and was co-written by St. Holmes and Nugent.

In retrospective interviews, Grange expressed dissatisfaction with Flicker's production, arguing that the finished album lacked the heavier sound the band had envisioned. Drummer Denny Carmassi, however, described the recording sessions positively and recalled a relaxed atmosphere during the making of the album.

== Release and promotion ==
St. Paradise was released by Warner Bros. Records in 1979. To support the album, the band toured extensively in North America and Europe. For live performances, the trio was augmented by keyboardist John Cory, a musician known to the band from the Detroit music scene who had also contributed keyboards and backing vocals to the album.

St. Paradise served as an opening act for Van Halen during the latter band's 1979 headlining tour of Europe. The band also performed dates with Patti Smith in North America. Drummer Denny Carmassi later recalled that the group generally received positive audience responses and was able to build a following during its touring activities.

The band's touring schedule included appearances on major concert bills. On July 21, 1979, St. Paradise appeared at Oakland Coliseum alongside Ted Nugent, Aerosmith, AC/DC, Mahogany Rush and Rush in a concert that sold 57,561 tickets, according to Billboard.

== Aftermath ==
Despite extensive touring and favorable reactions from concert audiences, St. Paradise failed to achieve significant commercial success. In later interviews, members of the band offered differing explanations for the album's poor performance. Bassist Rob Grange attributed the outcome to management decisions, the band's choice to distance itself from its Ted Nugent association, and dissatisfaction with producer Mike Flicker's sound. Vocalist Derek St. Holmes suggested that changing musical trends, including the growing popularity of disco music, created a difficult environment for hard rock acts. Drummer Denny Carmassi maintained that the album was strong but speculated that the group may not yet have fully developed its musical direction.

For live performances, St. Paradise expanded beyond its power-trio lineup with the addition of keyboardist John Cory. According to Grange, the band had considered moving toward a more keyboard-oriented sound and away from comparisons with Nugent's music.

The group continued writing and recording material following the release of the album. Carmassi later recalled that St. Paradise recorded a second album at Bearsville Studios with an English producer, but Warner Bros. Records declined to release it. The recordings remain unreleased.

By 1980, St. Paradise had disbanded. St. Holmes later cited financial difficulties as a major factor, noting the expense of maintaining the band's lineup and operations. Grange subsequently reflected that the group might have benefited from a different management strategy and from incorporating songs associated with the members' tenure in Ted Nugent's band into its live performances.

== Track listing ==
Credits adapted from the album liner notes.

Side one
No.	Title	Writer(s)	Length
1.	"Straight to You"	Derek St. Holmes	3:50
2.	"Gamblin' Man"	Eric Kaz	2:57
3.	"Jackie"	Denny Carmassi, Rob Grange, St.Holmes	3:39
4.	"Miami Slide"	St. Holmes	3:32
5.	"Hades"	Grange	3:59

Side two
No.	Title	Writer(s)	Length
6.	"Live It Up"	St. Holmes, Ted Nugent	3:29
7.	"Jesse James"	Carmassi, Grange, St. Holmes	4:45
8.	"Tighten the Knot"	St. Holmes	5:06
9.	"Beside the Sea"	St. Holmes	5:23
Total length:			36:00

== Personnel ==
All credits adapted from the original release.

- Derek St. Holmes – Electric and acoustic guitars, lead vocals
- Rob Grange – Bass and backing vocals
- Denny Carmassi – Drums and backing vocals

=== Additional musicians ===
- John Cory – Keyboards and backing vocals
- Marty Conn – Keyboards

=== Production ===
- Mike Flicker – producer, engineer
- David Krebs – direction
- Rick Diamond – photography
- Mick Rock – cover design
- Ernst Thormahlen – cover design
