= Wang Dang Sweet Poontang =

1977 single by Ted Nugent

Song by Ted Nugent

from the album Cat Scratch Fever
- A-side: "Cat Scratch Fever"
- Released: June 1977
- Recorded: 1977
- Genre: Hard rock
- Length: 3:17
- Label: Epic
- Songwriter: Ted Nugent
- Producers: Lew Futterman, Cliff Davies

"Wang Dang Sweet Poontang" is a hard rock song written and performed by Ted Nugent. It was first released in 1977 on the Epic album Cat Scratch Fever and as the B-side of the Epic single, Cat Scratch Fever. The song was produced by Lew Futterman and Cliff Davies. An extended live version of the song was released in 1978 on the Double Live Gonzo! album. The song has also been covered by various artists, including a 2020 cover by heavy metal supergroup BPMD.

The song's title is a rhyming and unsubtle reference to the male and female genitalia. The lyrics pay tribute to "a teenage queen" named Nadine who is "lookin' so clean, especially down in between."

As Nugent became active in conservative politics in his later years, the song's sexually explicit content drew attention in news and satire publications.

== Versions ==
=== Studio version ===
The original studio version of the song, running three minutes and 17 seconds, was released in June 1977, as the second track on Nugent's third studio album, Cat Scratch Fever. The studio version was also released in July 1977 as the B-side of the single, Cat Scratch Fever.

=== Live versions ===
An extended live version of the song, recorded in July 1977 at Nashville Municipal Auditorium and running six minutes and 18 seconds, was released in January 1978 on Nugent's Double Live Gonzo! album. In the introduction to the song on Double Live Gonzo, Nugent described it as "a love song" that he wanted to dedicate to "all that Nashville pussy." The band Nashville Pussy took its name from Nugent's introduction of the song.

A second live version of the song, recorded live at Cape Cod in 1981 and running five minutes and 39 seconds, was released in 2017 on the album, Cape Cod 1981. A third live version of the song, running five minutes and 54 seconds, was released on the 2019 album, The Little Box of Ted Nugent: Rare Live Broadcast Recordings.

=== Re-releases ===
Since their original release, the studio and 1977 live versions of the song have been featured on multiple compilation albums, including:

- Great Gonzos! The Best of Ted Nugent (1981), 1977 live version, 10th track
- Out of Control (1993), studio version, second track on disc two
- The Ultimate Ted Nugent (2002), studio version, 15th track
- Playlist: The Very Best of Ted Nugent (2009), studio version, fifth track
- The Essential Ted Nugent (2010), studio version, disc one, 15th track
- The Box Set Series (2014), studio version, disc two ninth track

=== Covers ===
The song has also been covered by other artists including Ain't Dead Yet in 1992, Malfunkshun in 1995, American Dog in 2003, Alex Mitchell in 2006, Jake E. Lee in 2008, BPMD in 2020.

== Reception ==
Drummer Mike Portnoy has described the introduction to the 1977 live version as "one of the greatest live intros of all time. It was such a classic, and everyone got so off on hearing it."

In 2001, music critic Greg Kot of the Chicago Tribune included Wang Dang Sweet Poontang in his list of five guilty pleasures, calling it "despicable misogyny, but the rawwwk doesn't get much rawer."

The song has also been ranked as one of the most popular in Nugent's oeuvre. Ultimate Classic Rock ranks the extended live version as No. 4 in its list of Nugent's best songs. The website "Classic Rock History" ranks it No. 3 in its list of the "Top 10 Ted Nugent Songs".

In a 1980 interview with Nugent in Musician (Player and Listener), he asserted that his solo on the song in Detroit on September 3, 1979, was the second most important event of the 1970s. In 2007, Nugent unveiled a monument to his mother and spoke of her influence: "I didn't change the lyrics to 'Wang Dang Sweet PoonTang' or anything but I was constantly reminded of her presence to always take the high road and be a gentleman at all costs."

== In popular culture and politics ==
As Nugent became active in conservative politics, the song drew attention in the media. In 2007, Reason magazine published a piece asking, "I'm just wondering, has Mike Huckabee listened to 'Wang Dang Sweet Poontang' by Ted Nugent? Does he know what that song is referring to?"

After Nugent called President Obama a "subhuman mongrel", he promised to stop calling people names, but added: "However, I have a little escape clause here, because when I'm on stage singing 'Wang Dang Sweet Poontang,' would you give me permission to go overboard on occasion?"

In April 2017, Billboard and Spin both published a tweet from actor Chad Lowe displaying a photograph of Nugent standing next to President Donald Trump in the Oval Office with the caption: "Wang Dang Sweet Poontang!"

During the 2020 U.S. presidential campaign, the satirical website The Hard Times published an article reporting that the Joe Biden campaign had adopted "Wang Dang Sweet Poontang" as an unofficial anthem to "energize donors" at Zoom events. The article further asserted that Nugent had demanded that Biden cease using the song. The satire published by The Hard Times resulted in some confusion as various websites assumed the account to be factual, rather than satirical. For example, Spin tweeted Nugent's cease and desist demand as factual in nature. Further, Texas radio station KLBJ-FM reported it on Facebook as a "huge blow to the Biden campaign."
