= Wanted: Ted or Alive =

American reality television series

Wanted: Ted or Alive is a reality television series that can be seen on the Versus channel, which used to be OLN. Rock musician Ted Nugent invited five strangers to his ranch in Michigan, where he teaches them survival skills, and then they compete for cash prizes.
