= Sand Dollar Blues Room =

Coordinates: 36.12585°N 115.18516°W

The Sand Dollar Blues Room is a blues and gambling nightclub in Las Vegas, Nevada.

== History ==
The club originally opened in 1976 as an ocean-themed restaurant in a small office complex about a mile from the Strip. The venue evolved into a blues club, and received a "Five Star" rating from Las Vegas Today magazine, the Review Journals' "Best of Las Vegas", and two years in a row, 2006 and 2007, AOL Cityguide' "Best Live Music".

The club has been the subject of articles in Playboy magazine and featured in shows on the Discovery Channel, The Travel Channel and VH1. America Online chose the Sand Dollar as one of the "10 Best Bars in the country". It also has been listed in the AOL city guide's best of.

The venue has hosted the blues artists B.B. King, George Thorogood, and Jeff Healey. Rock guitarist Ted Nugent once performed an impromptu guitar duet with blues artist Joe Bonamassa in front of a VH1 film crew. Trip Hawkins, the founder of Electronic Arts hosted a bachelor party there. Pop artist Taylor Dayne was once asked to perform a song.

The Sand Dollar has been under new ownership since January 1, 2010.
