= State of Shock (Ted Nugent album) =

Studio album by Ted Nugent
- Released: May 1979
- Recorded: 1979
- Studios: Quadradial Studios, Miami, Florida and CBS Recording Studios, New York City
- Genre: Hard rock
- Length: 40:43
- Label: Epic
- Producers: Lew Futterman, Cliff Davies

Ted Nugent chronology
Weekend Warriors (1978)	State of Shock (1979)	Scream Dream (1980)

Singles from State of Shock
- 1. "I Want to Tell You" Released: June 1979

Professional ratings
Review scores
Source	Rating
AllMusic	1.5/5 stars
Classic Rock	3/5 stars
Collector's Guide to Heavy Metal	9/10
Music Week	4/4 stars
The Rolling Stone Album Guide	2.5/5 stars

State of Shock is the fifth solo studio album by American rock musician Ted Nugent. It was released in May 1979 by Epic Records.

State of Shock closed a decade in which Nugent took his hard-rocking wildman persona to the top of the charts. Although the album reached the U.S. Top 20 and quickly went gold, it is Nugent's first solo album not to attain a platinum certification.

The best known track remains the album opener "Paralyzed", which was performed live on a 1980 episode of the TV show Fridays, and turned up again a year later on Great Gonzos! The Best of Ted Nugent. Other highlights include "Saddle Sore" and "Alone", a rare power ballad for him, sung by Charlie Huhn. A live show from this era is captured on the 1997 archive release Live at Hammersmith '79.

== Track listing ==
All songs written and arranged by Ted Nugent, except "I Want to Tell You", written by the Beatles's George Harrison

Side one
No.	Title	Lead vocals	Length
1.	"Paralyzed"	Ted Nugent	4:09
2.	"Take It or Leave It"	Nugent	4:07
3.	"Alone"	Charlie Huhn	5:20
4.	"It Don't Matter"	Huhn	3:08
5.	"State of Shock"	Nugent	3:22

Side two
No.	Title	Lead vocals	Length
6.	"I Want to Tell You"	Huhn	4:52
7.	"Satisfied"	Huhn	5:49
8.	"Bite Down Hard"	Huhn	3:21
9.	"Snake Charmer"	Huhn	3:19
10.	"Saddle Sore"	Cliff Davies	3:16

== Personnel ==
Band members

- Ted Nugent – lead and rhythm guitars, lead vocals (on tracks 1, 2, 5), backing vocals, percussion
- Charlie Huhn – lead vocals (on tracks 3, 4, 6, 7, 8, 9), backing vocals
- Walt Monaghan – bass
- Cliff Davies – drums, lead vocals (on track 10), backing vocals, producer

Additional musicians

- Leah Kilburn – backing vocals (on track 3)

Production

- Lew Futterman – producer
- Tim Geelan – engineer
- David Gotlieb, Lou Schlossberg – assistant engineers
- David McCullough – mixing assistant
- Bob Heimall – art direction
- Gerard Huertia – lettering
- Ron Pownall – photography
- David Krebs, Steve Leber – directors

== Charts ==
Chart (1979)	Peak position
Australia Albums (Kent Music Report)	57
Canada Top Albums/CDs (RPM)	18
US Billboard 200	18

== Certifications ==
Region	Certification	Certified units/sales
Canada (Music Canada)	Gold	50,000^{^}
United States (RIAA)	Gold	500,000^{^}
^{^} Shipments figures based on certification alone.

== See also ==
- Ted Nugent discography
