= The Flying Lip Lock =

Song by Ted Nugent

from the album Intensities in 10 Cities
- Released: March 1981
- Recorded: 1981
- Genre: Hard rock Rock and roll Boogie rock
- Length: 4:07
- Label: Epic
- Songwriter: Ted Nugent

Ted Nugent singles chronology
"Land of a Thousand Dances" (1981)	"The Flying Lip Lock" (1981)	"Little Miss Dangerous" (1986)

"The Flying Lip Lock" is a song by Ted Nugent from his second live album Intensities in 10 Cities. It reached the US Mainstream Rock chart in March 1981 based on airplay.

== Chart positions ==
Chart (1981–1982)	Peak position
US Billboard Top Rock Tracks	36
