= Shutup & Jam! =

Studio album by Ted Nugent
- Released: July 8, 2014
- Recorded: 2014
- Genre: Hard rock
- Length: 46:58
- Label: Frontiers
- Producers: Michael Lutz, Ted Nugent

Ted Nugent chronology
Motor City Mayhem (2009)	Shutup & Jam! (2014)	The Music Made Me Do It (2018)

Shutup & Jam! is the fourteenth studio album by American rock musician Ted Nugent. It was released on July 7, 2014, in the United Kingdom and on July 8, 2014, in the United States. It features a guest appearance by Sammy Hagar on the song "She's Gone", and is Nugent's first studio album since 2007's Love Grenade. The album was released on CD, red 12-inch vinyl, and as digital download. This is the last album to feature drummer Mick Brown.

== Track listing ==
1. "Shutup & Jam!"
2. "Fear Itself"
3. "Everything Matters"
4. "She's Gone" (feat. Sammy Hagar)
5. "Never Stop Believing"
6. "I Still Believe"
7. "I Love My BBQ"
8. "Throttledown"
9. "Do-Rags and a .45"
10. "Screaming Eagles"
11. "Semper Fi"
12. "Trample the Weak Hurdle the Dead"
13. "Never Stop Believing (Blues)"

== Personnel ==
- Ted Nugent – lead guitar, six-string bass, vocals
- Derek St. Holmes – rhythm guitar, backing vocals, lead vocals on "Everything Matters"
- Greg Smith – bass
- Mick Brown – drums on "Screaming Eagles", "Johnny B. Good Forever"
- Johnny Bee Badanjek – drums on "She's Gone", "I Still Believe"
- Jonathan Kutz – drums on "Shutup & Jam!", "Fear Itself", "Throttledown", "Trample the Weak", "Semper Fi", "Do-Rags and a .45", "Everything Matters", "I Love My BBQ", "Never Stop Believing", "Never Stop Believing (Blues)"
- Sammy Hagar – vocals on "She's Gone"
- Andy Patalan – engineering, mixing, mastering, backing vocals
- Tim Patalan – engineering

Produced by Michael Lutz and Ted Nugent

== Charts ==
Chart (2014)	Peak position
Belgian Albums (Ultratop Wallonia)	142
US Billboard 200	102
US Top Hard Rock Albums (Billboard)	9
US Top Rock Albums (Billboard)	26
