= If You Can't Lick 'Em... Lick 'Em =

Studio album by Ted Nugent
- Released: February 1988
- Recorded: 1987
- Studio: Conway (Hollywood, California)
- Genre: Hard rock, glam metal
- Length: 40:12
- Label: Atlantic
- Producer: Tom Werman, Duane Baron, John Purdell, Ted Nugent

Ted Nugent chronology
Little Miss Dangerous (1986)	If You Can't Lick 'Em... Lick 'Em (1988)	Spirit of the Wild (1995)

Professional ratings
Review scores
Source	Rating
AllMusic	2/5 stars
Classic Rock	6/10 stars
Collector's Guide to Heavy Metal	6/10

If You Can't Lick 'Em... Lick 'Em is the tenth studio album by American hard rock guitarist Ted Nugent. The album was released in February 1988, by Atlantic Records and reached No. 112 in the Billboard 200 US chart. It also marks the first album to feature Nugent as the sole lead vocalist after only providing secondary lead vocals on previous albums.

Promotional music videos were released for "She Drives Me Crazy" and "That's the Story of Love".

== Track listing ==
All songs written and arranged by Ted Nugent, except "That's the Story of Love", written by Jon Bon Jovi, Richie Sambora and Ted Nugent.

Side one
No.	Title	Length
1.	"Can't Live with 'Em"	4:19
2.	"She Drives Me Crazy"	2:45
3.	"If You Can't Lick 'Em... Lick 'Em"	6:10
4.	"Skintight"	3:10
5.	"Funlover"	4:45

Side two
No.	Title	Length
6.	"Spread Your Wings"	5:59
7.	"The Harder They Come (The Harder I Get)"	3:39
8.	"Separate the Men from the Boys, Please"	3:55
9.	"Bite the Hand"	2:58
10.	"That's the Story of Love"	3:01

== Personnel ==
=== Musicians ===
- Ted Nugent – lead and backing vocals, lead guitar, bass, producer
- Dave Amato – rhythm guitar, backing vocals
- Jai Winding – Hammond B3 organ
- John Purdell – keyboards, producer on tracks 2, 3, 8–10
- Chuck Wright – bass
- Pat Torpey – drums, backing vocals
- Tom Werman – percussion, producer on tracks 1, 4–7, executive producer

=== Production ===
- Duane Baron – producer on tracks 2, 3, 8–10, engineer
- Richard McKernan – engineer
- Bryan Arnett, Gary Wagner – assistant engineers
- Bobby Warner – mastering
- Bob Defrin – art direction
- Peter Tsakiris – art direction, design
- Ross Marino – photography
- Roy Volkman – cover photo, photography
- Eric Conn – digital remastering

== Charts ==
Chart (1988)	Peak position
Finnish Albums (The Official Finnish Charts)	30
US Billboard 200	112
