= Derek St. Holmes =

American singer and guitarist (born 1953)

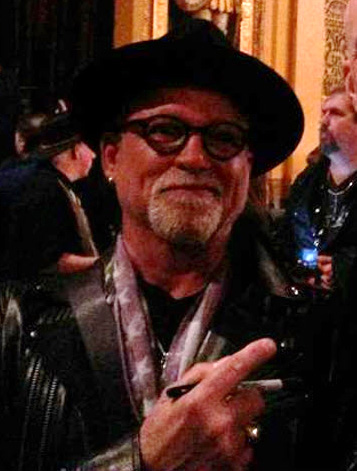
- St. Holmes at the 2016 Dick Wagner Memorial Concert in Detroit

Background information
- Born: February 24, 1953 (age 73); Riverview, Michigan, U.S.
- Genres: Rock, hard rock
- Occupations: Singer, musician, songwriter
- Instruments: Vocals, guitar
- Years active: 1974–present
- Member of: Whitford/St. Holmes
- Formerly of: Ted Nugent, St. Paradise, Michael Schenker Group

Derek St. Holmes (born February 24, 1953) is an American rock musician, best known as the lead singer and rhythm guitar player for Ted Nugent's early solo career. After splitting from Nugent in 1978, St. Holmes worked with various artists, most notably the Whitford/St. Holmes project with Brad Whitford, who had then recently parted ways with Aerosmith. He has also reunited with Nugent on several occasions.

== Early years ==
St. Holmes was born and raised in Riverview, Michigan, a suburb of Detroit. He received his first guitar for his eleventh birthday. He started his own neighborhood band, The Organized Confusion, and also played for high school dances.

== Career ==
=== 1970s ===
St. Holmes started the three-piece band Scott in 1972, for which he was lead guitarist, vocalist and songwriter. In 1974, Scott opened for an Amboy Dukes show at the Lincoln Park Theater. The Amboy Dukes and their guitar player Ted Nugent had already recorded several albums and were a staple of the Midwest rock scene at the time. When the Amboy Dukes broke up, Nugent's road manager (Phil Nicholson) contacted St. Holmes about auditioning as lead singer for Nugent's new solo project.

St. Holmes joined Ted Nugent, former Amboy Dukes bassist Rob Grange and drummer Cliff Davies to release Nugent's self-titled debut album in 1975. He is the lead vocalist on the three most popular recordings from the debut album: "Hey Baby" (also composed by St. Holmes), "Stranglehold" and "Just What the Doctor Ordered". St. Holmes briefly left Nugent in mid-1976, citing personal, financial and musical differences. He returned in time to contribute to several songs on Nugent's sophomore effort Free-for-All, including lead vocals on "Dog Eat Dog", but by that time several of the album's songs had already been recorded with Meat Loaf providing lead vocals. St. Holmes remained in Nugent's band for the 1977 album Cat Scratch Fever and its subsequent tour which produced the 1978 Double Live Gonzo! album. He and Nugent then parted ways, as their differences continued to grow.

In 1979, St. Holmes joined up with Ted Nugent's bass player Rob Grange and ex-Montrose drummer Denny Carmassi to form St. Paradise. They released one self-titled album for Warner Bros. in 1979 before moving on to other musical projects.

=== 1980s ===
In 1981, St. Holmes teamed up with Aerosmith guitarist Brad Whitford for the short-lived Whitford/St. Holmes band. As with St. Paradise, Whitford/St. Holmes released only one self-titled album before splitting.

After a four-album absence, St. Holmes reappeared in Ted Nugent's studio band for the 1982 album Nugent, singing lead on six of the album's ten tracks.

In 1983, St. Holmes contributed vocals to one song on the Michael Schenker Group release Built to Destroy, and also appeared on the live follow-up, Rock Will Never Die. However, frequent long trips to England and Europe had St. Holmes wanting to return home to the US, where he had a wife and newborn child, and he departed MSG amicably.

=== 1990s ===
In 1995, St. Holmes reunited with Ted Nugent for the latter's Spirit of the Wild album, on which St. Holmes co-wrote seven songs and sang lead on six.

After another departure from Nugent, St. Holmes co-founded the supergroup Big People in 1999, which also included guitarist Pat Travers, bassist/vocalist Benjamin Orr (The Cars), guitarist/vocalist Jeff Carlisi (.38 Special) and drummer Liberty DeVitto (Billy Joel). The band performed live, covering songs from each artist's past groups, but did not put out an album, as Orr died in 2000 and the group did not want to continue with a replacement.

=== Later career ===
In 2000, St. Holmes released his first solo album Then and Now, a collection of his own rock material. Bassist Chase Chitty (Pat Travers Band), drummer Steve Pace (Hydra, Krokus, Whitford/St. Holmes) and keyboardist Russ Still accompany St. Holmes with songs such as "Standing in the Rain", "Dr. Love" and "Surrounded", and the energy rocker "In Too Deep".

On July 4, 2008, St. Holmes made a guest appearance at Ted Nugent's 6,000th concert in Detroit. He jammed on "Hey Baby", "Cat Scratch Fever", and "Stranglehold" with Nugent. On August 24, 2008, he joined Nugent on stage at Capital One Bank Theatre at Westbury in Westbury, New York. He sang and played guitar with Nugent on "Hey Baby", "Just What the Doctor Ordered", "Dog Eat Dog", "Stormtroopin", "Cat Scratch Fever" and "Stranglehold".

St. Holmes re-recorded some famous Aerosmith songs for a special promotion and made them available in MP3 format on his website.

St. Holmes sang in the Paul Reed Smith Band, co-writing songs such as "One in the Same" and "Ice Cold Kisses". The self-titled CD was released in June 2010, with a second album, Time to Testify released in February 2017.

On December 27, 2008, St. Holmes was a special guest at a Get the Led Out concert at Ram's Head Live in Baltimore, Maryland. He played guitar for "Rock and Roll", then sang and played "Stranglehold" (Ted Nugent). St. Holmes is actually the voice heard in the track recording. He also performed "Stranglehold" with Get the Led Out at the Nokia in New York City in March 2009 and again in Baltimore in May 2010.

In 2010, St. Holmes participated in a tribute album titled Mister Bolin's Late Night Revival, a compilation of 17 previously unreleased tracks written by guitar legend Tommy Bolin prior to his death in 1976. The CD includes other artists such as HiFi Superstar, Doogie White, Eric Martin, Troy Luccketta, Jeff Pilson, Randy Jackson, Rachel Barton, Rex Carroll, Kimberley Dahme, and The 77's. A percentage of the proceeds from this project will benefit the Jackson Recovery Centers.

He toured again with Nugent from 2011 to 2014 and appeared on Nugent's 2014 album Shutup & Jam! Whitford/St. Holmes reunited for a 2015 tour and the follow-up CD Reunion was sold at these shows.

Also in 2014, St. Holmes announced that Gibson would release a signature guitar in his name later in the year. The guitar is a white Gibson SG custom with an ebony fingerboard and three humbucker pickups. The guitar is fitted with a vibrola.

St. Holmes performed at the 2015 Dick Wagner Memorial "Remember the Child" benefit concert in Detroit, and he co-headlined the same event in 2016 with Brad Whitford and The Frost.

In 2017, St. Holmes surprised fans by joining an REO Speedwagon performance for an impromptu rendition of "Stranglehold" during the annual NAHA (Native American Heritage Assoc) benefit Rock Legends Cruise.

St. Holmes is known for playing a variety of guitars throughout his career, including Fender Stratocasters, Gibson Les Pauls, PRS Guitars, and various Gibson hollow-bodies.

== Discography ==
=== Main albums with Ted Nugent ===
1975 Ted Nugent Ted Nugent (Epic Records)

1976 Ted Nugent Free-for-All (Epic Records)

1977 Ted Nugent Cat Scratch Fever (Epic Records)

1978 Ted Nugent Double Live Gonzo! (Epic Records)

1982 Ted Nugent Nugent (Atlantic Records)

1995 Ted Nugent Spirit of the Wild (Atlantic Records)

2014 Ted Nugent Shutup & Jam! (Frontiers Records)

=== Main albums – Others ===
1979 St. Paradise St. Paradise (Warner Bros. Records)

1981 Whitford/St. Holmes Whitford/St. Holmes (CBS Records)

1991 Vanilla Fudge The Best of Vanilla Fudge Live (Rhino Records)

2000 Derek St. Holmes Then & Now (Perris Records)

2009 Blood of the Sun Death Ride (Brainticket Records)

2011 The Paul Reed Smith Band (Cargo Records)

2015 Derek St. Holmes Band Derek St. Holmes Band (Bentnote Music)

2016 Whitford/St. Holmes Reunion

=== Contributions ===
1983 Michael Schenker Group Built to Destroy (Chrysalis Records) (contributed vocals on the US mix of Still Love That Little Devil)

1984 Michael Schenker Group Rock Will Never Die (Chrysalis Records) (Rhythm guitar, backing vocals, co-lead vocals on "I'm Gonna Make You Mine" and "Rock You to the Ground")

1989 Nightmare Beach Movie Soundtrack

1994 Dazed and Confused Movie Soundtrack (MCA Pictures)

1996 Steve Fister Shadow King (FTP Records) (contributed vocals on 3 songs)

1997 Private Parts Movie Soundtrack (Paramount/WB)

1999 That '70s Show/Rockin TV Sitcom Soundtrack (Volcano Records)

2001 Various Artists Welcome to the Aerosmithsonian: A Tribute to Aerosmith (Perris Records)

2010 Mister Bolin's Late Night Revival What If ... (Rainbow Foundation Music Inc.) (contributed vocals on 1 song)

=== Compilations ===
1981 Ted Nugent Great Gonzos (Epic Records)
