= Double Live Gonzo! =

Live album by Ted Nugent
- Released: February 1978
- Recorded: with Reelsound, Haji Sound ("Stormtroopin'") and Fedco Audio Remote Recorders ("Stranglehold")
- Genre: Hard rock
- Length: 84:57
- Label: Epic
- Producers: Lew Futterman, Tom Werman

Ted Nugent chronology
Cat Scratch Fever (1977)	Double Live Gonzo! (1978)	Weekend Warriors (1978)

Singles from Double Live Gonzo!
- 1. "Yank Me, Crank Me" Released: March 1978

Professional ratings
Review scores
Source	Rating
AllMusic	4.5/5 stars
Classic Rock	3/5 stars
Collector's Guide to Heavy Metal	8/10
Record Mirror	3/5 stars
Rolling Stone	(favorable)

Double Live Gonzo! is a live album by the American hard rock guitarist Ted Nugent, released as a double LP in 1978. In addition to live versions of songs from previous albums, this double album also contains original material played live, including: "Yank Me, Crank Me" and "Gonzo". The album has reached 3× Platinum status in the United States.

Assistant Producer Ric Browde stated in an interview on the Full in Bloom podcast that literally every instrument, every vocal, and all audience noise heard on the album was actually recorded in the studio. Nothing on the album was actually recorded live in concert, it is entirely a studio album.

== Recording ==
Nugent later said, "There are moments on that album I can not listen to. I can not listen to "Stranglehold". It's a piece of shit. The son of a bitch is too slow. It's out of fucking tune. "Great White Buffalo" is one of my all-time favorite songs. I can't even listen to the cocksucker on that record."

== Track listing ==
All tracks are written by Ted Nugent, except "Baby, Please Don't Go" written by Big Joe Williams.

Side one
No.	Title	Recorded at	Length
1.	"Just What the Doctor Ordered" (from Ted Nugent)	Nashville Municipal Auditorium, July 2, 1977	5:26
2.	"Yank Me, Crank Me"	Taylor County Coliseum, Abilene, Texas, November 5, 1977	4:28
3.	"Gonzo"	Freeman Coliseum, San Antonio, November 6, 1977	3:59
4.	"Baby Please Don't Go" (from The Amboy Dukes)	Freeman Coliseum, San Antonio, November 6, 1977	5:58

Side two
No.	Title	Recorded at	Length
5.	"Great White Buffalo" (from Tooth, Fang & Claw)	Municipal Auditorium, Dallas, July 29, 1976	6:23
6.	"Hibernation" (from Tooth, Fang & Claw)	San Antonio Convention Center, July 25, 1976	16:54

Side three
No.	Title	Recorded at	Length
1.	"Stormtroopin'" (from Ted Nugent)	Seattle Center Coliseum, August 31, 1977	8:46
2.	"Stranglehold" (from Ted Nugent)	Springfield Civic Center, June 10, 1977	11:14

Side four
No.	Title	Recorded at	Length
3.	"Wang Dang Sweet Poontang" (from Cat Scratch Fever)	Nashville Municipal Auditorium, July 2, 1977	6:18
4.	"Cat Scratch Fever" (from Cat Scratch Fever)	Nashville Municipal Auditorium, July 2, 1977	4:49
5.	"Motor City Madhouse" (from Ted Nugent)	Municipal Auditorium, Dallas, July 29, 1976	10:35

== Personnel ==
Band members

- Derek St. Holmes – rhythm guitar, lead and backing vocals
- Ted Nugent – lead guitar, backing and lead vocals, arrangements
- Rob Grange – bass
- Cliff Davies – drums, backing vocals

Production

- Lew Futterman, Tom Werman – producers
- Ric Browde – assistant to the producers
- Tim Geelan – engineer, mixing at CBS Studios, New York
- Don Puluse – engineer
- Chet Himes, Malcom Harper, Alex Kazanegas, Tom Arrison, Bob Dickson, Perry Cheatham – remote recorders personnel
- Gerard Huerta – lettering
- David Gahr – photography
- John Berg, Paula Scher – design
- Mark Wilder – digital remastering

== Charts ==
Chart (1978)	Peak position
Canada Top Albums/CDs (RPM)	11
Swedish Albums (Sverigetopplistan)	24
UK Albums (Official Charts)	47
US Billboard 200	13

== Certifications ==
Region	Certification	Certified units/sales
Canada (Music Canada)	Gold	50,000^{^}
United States (RIAA)	3× Platinum	3,000,000^{^}
^{^} Shipments figures based on certification alone.
