= Need You Bad =

Single by Ted Nugent

from the album Weekend Warriors
- Released: December 1978
- Recorded: 1978
- Genre: Hard rock
- Length: 4:19
- Label: Epic
- Songwriter(s): Ted Nugent
- Producer(s): Tom Werman; Lew Futterman

Ted Nugent singles chronology
"Yank Me, Crank Me" (1978)	"Need You Bad" (1978)	"Wango Tango" (1980)

"Need You Bad" is a song written and recorded by the American hard rock musician Ted Nugent from his fourth studio album Weekend Warriors. Charlie Huhn handles the lead vocals.

== Chart positions ==
Chart (1979)	Peak position
Canadian RPM Top Singles	82
U.S. Billboard Hot 100	84
