= Hey Baby (Ted Nugent song) =

Single by Ted Nugent

from the album Ted Nugent
- Released: March 1976 (US)
- Recorded: 1975
- Genre: Hard rock, blues rock
- Length: 4:00
- Label: Epic
- Songwriter: Derek St. Holmes
- Producers: Tom Werman; Lew Futterman

Ted Nugent singles chronology
"Hey Baby" (1976)	"Dog Eat Dog" (1976)

"Hey Baby" is a 1975 rock single from the album Ted Nugent, the first solo release by American guitarist Ted Nugent. The song features lead vocals by rhythm guitarist Derek St. Holmes, and was the only song on the album that St. Holmes wrote and arranged himself.

== Charts ==
Chart (1975–96)	Peak position
Australia (Kent Music Report)	94
US Billboard Hot 100	72

== See also ==
- 1975 in music
- Ted Nugent discography
