= Spirit of the Wild =

Studio album by Ted Nugent
- Released: April 25, 1995
- Studio: Tazmania Studios, Ann Arbor, Michigan
- Genre: Hard rock
- Length: 60:56
- Label: Atlantic
- Producer: Mike Lutz, Ted Nugent

Ted Nugent chronology
If You Can't Lick 'Em... Lick 'Em (1988)	Spirit of the Wild (1995)	Live at Hammersmith '79 (1997)

Professional ratings
Review scores
Source	Rating
AllMusic	4.5/5 stars
Classic Rock	5/10 stars
Collector's Guide to Heavy Metal	4/10

Spirit of the Wild is the eleventh studio album by American hard rock musician Ted Nugent. It was released in April 1995 by Atlantic Records. The album was produced by Mike Lutz from the rock band Brownsville Station and engineered by Lutz and Jim Vitti. It is Nugent's only album released in the 1990s.

Spirit of the Wild marked the return of Nugent's original sound of hard rock instead of the pop metal style of his '80s solo work, as well as the brief return of vocalist and guitarist Derek St. Holmes. "Spirit of the Wild" is the theme song for Nugent's hunting TV show Spirit of the Wild. The sixth track "Fred Bear" is a tribute to the bowman Fred Bear.

== Track listing ==
No.	Title	Writer(s)	Length
1.	"Thighraceous"	Derek St. Holmes, Ted Nugent	3:48
2.	"Wrong Side of Town"	Benny Rappa, Lutz, Nugent	5:15
3.	"I Shoot Back"	St. Holmes, Lutz, Nugent	3:50
4.	"Tooth, Fang & Claw"	Nugent	6:49
5.	"Lovejacker"	St. Holmes, Lutz, Nugent	4:32
6.	"Fred Bear"	Nugent	7:41
7.	"Primitive Man"	St. Holmes, Lutz, Nugent	5:56
8.	"Hot or Cold"	St. Holmes, Lutz, Nugent	4:31
9.	"Kiss My Ass"	Nugent	3:20
10.	"Heart & Soul"	St. Holmes, Lutz, Nugent	4:44
11.	"Spirit of the Wild"	St. Holmes, Nugent	4:22
12.	"Just Do It Like This"	Nugent	6:08

== Personnel ==
Band members

- Ted Nugent – guitar, lead vocals (except where noted), lyrics, attitude, backstraps and security, producer
- Derek St. Holmes – lead vocals (tracks 1, 2, 5, 7, 10, 11)
- Mike Lutz – bass, keyboards, vocals, producer, engineer, mixing
- Denny Carmassi – drums

Additional musicians

- Larry Fratangelo – percussion
- Benny Rappa – drums (track 2), background vocals (tracks 2, 10)
- Gunner Ross – drums (track 6)
- Doug Banker – piano (track 8), background vocals (tracks 9, 11), management

Production

- Jim Vitti – engineer, mixing
- Brian Delaney, Jeff Campo – assistant engineers
- George Marino – mastering
- Donald May – art direction
- Steve Galli – cover photographer from Cobo Arena, Detroit, Michigan, January 1, 1995

== Charts ==
Chart (1995)	Peak position
US Billboard 200	86
