= Rob Grange =

American bass guitarist

- Born: 1950 (age 75–76)
- Origin: Flint, Michigan, U.S.
- Genre: Hard rock
- Occupation: Musician
- Instrument: Bass guitar
- Years active: 1965–present
- Formerly of: The Amboy Dukes; Ted Nugent Band; St. Paradise; Duke X
- Website: robgrangebass.com

Rob Grange (born 1950) is an American bassist, best known for his work with psychedelic rock band The Amboy Dukes and with Ted Nugent, as well as his unique phase bass lines in the song "Stranglehold".

== Career ==
=== Sonny Hugg ===
Grange was a member of Sonny Hugg, a Michigan early progressive rock group that released one single in 1970 on Silo Records in Lansing, Michigan. It was a cover tune titled "Daybreak" and was written by Richard Zehringer, later known as Rick Derringer of The McCoys. Sonny Hugg was composed of Craig Marsden on lead vocals and guitar, Barry Best on keys and vocals, Rob Ross on drums, and Grange on bass.

=== The Amboy Dukes ===
In June 1971, Grange (vocals, bass) became a member of the rock band Ted Nugent and The Amboy Dukes with Nugent (guitar), John Angelos (lead vocals) and Joe Vitale (drums), the latter replaced in January 1972 by K.J. Knight (drums, vocals). In March 1972, Angelos left the band and was replaced by Danny Gore (lead vocals, rhythm guitar). In October 1972, Knight and Gore left the band, the former being replaced by Vic Mastrianni (vocals, drums).

In 1973, the band recorded an album titled Call of the Wild with the help of session men Andy Jezowski (vocals) and Gabriel "Gabe" Magno (organ Hammond B-3, piano, synthesizer, flute). Magno also went on the road with the band, but after a few gigs, they decided to drop having a live keyboard player and went back to a three piece lineup.

In 1974, the band released the album Tooth Fang & Claw. Soon after, Mastrianni left the band, replaced by Brian Staffeld (drums), and by late 1974, Derek St. Holmes (vocals, rhythm guitar) joined the band. At this point Nugent dropped The Amboy Dukes name and the band became The Ted Nugent Band.

=== Ted Nugent ===
Grange and the other members did not want to be considered a backing band and one of the conditions of St. Holmes joining them was it would be treated like a collective band. They toured as The Ted Nugent Band and, in 1975, they went into the studio to do their first album, which at the time was unnamed, for Epic Records.

At this point, David Krebs of Leber & Krebs Management, who also managed Aerosmith, convinced Nugent to drop the "band" and just call it "Ted Nugent". This was a total surprise to the "band" and it was the beginning of the end. The nucleus of Grange, Derek St. Holmes, and Cliff Davies for songwriting, as well as arranging, was forever broken. In 1978, three years later and with four platinum albums titled Ted Nugent, Free-for-All, Cat Scratch Fever and Double Live Gonzo!, Grange and St. Holmes moved on to form a new rock band, St. Paradise, because Nugent did not want a "band concept". In Martin Popoff's book Epic Ted Nugent, Nugent admits that the song "Stranglehold" was co-written by Grange, yet he never received a share for co-writer. Their last concert together as the original lineup was Cal Jam 2 on March 18, 1978.

== Discography ==
=== Main albums with Ted Nugent ===
1975 Ted Nugent Ted Nugent (Epic Records)*

1976 Ted Nugent Free-for-All (Epic Records)*

1977 Ted Nugent Cat Scratch Fever (Epic Records)*

1978 Ted Nugent Double Live Gonzo! (Epic Records)*

1993 Ted Nugent Out of Control (Epic Records)

Contains previously unreleased songs with vocals by Derek St. Holmes "Street Rats" (alternate version – original vocals by Meat Loaf) and "Magic Party"

Compilations 1981 Ted Nugent Great Gonzos (Epic Records)**

=== St. Paradise ===
Grange and St. Holmes moved forward with a new band called St. Paradise featuring Denny Carmassi of Montrose on drums and John Corey later of the 1994 reunion of The Eagles on keyboards. They released one eponymous album for Warner Bros. in 1979, before splitting up. The LP album BSK 3281 contained the following nine tracks:

Track	Title	Composed	Time
1	"Straight To You"	St. Holmes	3:52
2	"Gamblin' Man"	Eric Kaz	2:56
3	"Jackie"	Carmassi, Grange & St. Holmes	3:43
4	"Miami Slide"	St. Holmes	3:36
5	"Hades"	Grange	4:01
6	"Live It Up"	St. Holmes & Nugent	3:30
7	"Jesse James"	Carmassi, Grange & St. Holmes	4:52
8	"Tighten The Knot"	St. Holmes	5:06
9	"Beside The Sea"	St. Holmes	5:23

=== 2010 Dallas International Guitar Festival ===
Grange, St. Holmes and Nugent were reunited on stage after more than 30 years at the festival and played "Just What The Doctor Ordered" from their first album Ted Nugent and the classic Chuck Berry tune "Johnny B Goode" featuring blues guitar legend Bugs Henderson.

=== dukEX to GRANGE ===
"dukEX" is a new project with Rob Grange – Bass (Sonny Hugg, Amboy Dukes, Ted Nugent, St. Paradise), Danny Gore – Guitars/Keyboards (Ormandy, Amboy Dukes), and Matt Bowers – Drums (Kill Betty, PRS Band and Derek St Holmes). Martin Popoff described dukEX as "Duke X" is some cool, proggy vibes. Modern, super hi-fi recording...... this is really interesting instrumental writing." Martin Popoff

In the summer of 2020, Rob Grange and Danny Gore produced and released a new project called GRANGE, due to the name dukEX being used by so many other people on YouTube.

== Equipment ==
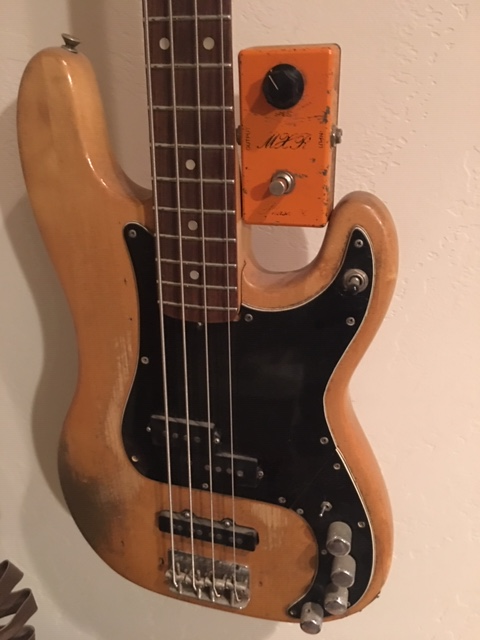
Stranglehold Bass

Grange plays early Fender basses, circa '56–'62. In 1973, he was the first documented bassist to modify his '62 Fender Precision bass by adding a Pre-CBS Fender Jazz pickup, a configuration later to be known as a "P/J" bass. This resulted in adding highs to the tone. He took this a step further and added a toggle switch and an "out of phase" switch. This bass became known as the "Stranglehold Bass". It wasn't until the 80s that Fender picked up on this popular trend and produced their first Fender P/J basses.

His favorite live bass was a vintage '56 Fender P-Bass. Grange also obtained a Sunn Amp from John Paul Jones of Led Zeppelin, which he used in his live concert rig. He used an 8-String Hagstrom Bass on "Snakeskin Cowboys". Grange wrote the main phase bass for Stranglehold and used an early MXR "Script" Phase 90 and an Ampeg B-18 in the studio. Grange also plays a Sadowsky Metro P/J, black finish with a maple neck.
