= Home Bound =

Single by Ted Nugent

from the album Cat Scratch Fever
- Released: January 1978
- Recorded: 1977
- Genre: Instrumental rock; hard rock; heavy metal
- Length: 4:43
- Songwriter(s): Ted Nugent

Ted Nugent singles chronology
"Cat Scratch Fever" (1977)	"Home Bound" (1978)	"Yank Me, Crank Me" (1978)

"Home Bound" is an instrumental by American rock musician Ted Nugent and his fifth single. It is the fifth track on his most popular album, Cat Scratch Fever. It was sampled by the Beastie Boys and Biz Markie as "The Biz vs the Nuge" on the album Check Your Head in 1992.

== Charts ==
Chart (1978)	Peak position
US Billboard Hot 100	70
