= Wango Tango (song) =

Single by Ted Nugent

from the album Scream Dream
- B-side: "Scream Dream"
- Released: July 1980
- Genre: Hard rock, heavy metal
- Length: 4:50
- Label: Epic Records
- Songwriter: Ted Nugent

"Wango Tango" is a song written and recorded by American hard rock musician Ted Nugent. The song peaked on the Billboard Hot 100 at #86. One of Nugent's best known songs, it has been a staple of his live performances for many years.

Allmusic reviewer Bret Adams has praised the song as "addictive" and "wickedly catchy", also marking it as an 'album pick' for being one of the best tracks of parent album Scream Dream. However, it was ranked seventh on Guitar World's list of the "100 Worst Riffs, Licks & Solos Of All Time".

== Chart positions ==
Chart (1980)	Peak position
U.S. Billboard Hot 100	86

== See also ==
- 1980 in music
- Ted Nugent discography
- "Wang Dang Sweet Poontang"
