= Cat Scratch Fever =

Studio album by Ted Nugent
- Released: May 13, 1977
- Recorded: January and March 1977
- Studios: Columbia Recording Studios, New York, and CBS Studios, London
- Genre: Hard rock
- Length: 38:16
- Label: Epic
- Producers: Lew Futterman, Tom Werman, Cliff Davies

Ted Nugent chronology
Free-for-All (1976)	Cat Scratch Fever (1977)	Double Live Gonzo! (1978)

Singles from Cat Scratch Fever
- 1. "Cat Scratch Fever" Released: July 1977; 2. "Home Bound" Released: January 1978

Cat Scratch Fever is the third studio album by American rock musician Ted Nugent. It was released on May 13, 1977, by Epic Records. Vocalist Derek St. Holmes, who had left the band during the recording of the album Free-for-All, had come back for touring in 1976 and was again the principal lead singer on this album. It is the last studio album to feature bassist Rob Grange.

A commercial success, the album has been certified multi-platinum by the RIAA. Nugent released his next album, Double Live Gonzo!, the following year.

== Reception ==
Professional ratings
Review scores
Source	Rating
AllMusic	4.5/5 stars
Classic Rock	5/5 stars
Christgau's Record Guide	B
Collector's Guide to Heavy Metal	8/10
Rolling Stone	(favorable)

Cat Scratch Fever received a mostly positive review from Greg Prato of AllMusic, who remarked that it "matched the focused ferocity of Nugent's excellent 1975 debut", proclaiming it a "first-rate set of brash hard rockers".

== Track listing ==
All songs written by Ted Nugent, except "Live It Up" (written by Nugent and Derek St. Holmes). All songs arranged by Nugent, Rob Grange, St. Holmes, and Cliff Davies.

Side one
No.	Title	Lead vocals	Length
1.	"Cat Scratch Fever"	Ted Nugent	3:41
2.	"Wang Dang Sweet Poontang"	Nugent	3:17
3.	"Death by Misadventure"	Derek St. Holmes	3:31
4.	"Live It Up"	St. Holmes	4:02
5.	"Home Bound" (instrumental)		4:43

Side two
No.	Title	Lead vocals	Length
6.	"Workin' Hard, Playin' Hard"	St. Holmes	5:44
7.	"Sweet Sally"	Nugent	2:34
8.	"A Thousand Knives"	St. Holmes	4:48
9.	"Fist Fightin' Son of a Gun"	St. Holmes	2:51
10.	"Out of Control"	St. Holmes	3:27

1999 CD reissue bonus tracks
No.	Title	Length
11.	"Cat Scratch Fever" (live)	4:52
12.	"Wang Dang Sweet Poontang" (live)	5:44

== Personnel ==
Band members

- Ted Nugent – lead guitar, backing vocals, lead vocals on tracks 1, 2, 7, percussion
- Derek St. Holmes – lead vocals, rhythm guitar, arrangements
- Rob Grange – bass, backing vocals, arrangements
- Cliff Davies – drums, backing vocals, arrangements

Additional musicians

- Alan Spenner, Boz Burrell, Rory Dodd – backing vocals
- Montego Joe – percussion
- Tom Werman – percussion, backing vocals

Production

- Cliff Davies – production
- Tom Werman – production
- Lew Futterman – production
- Tim Geelan, Wayne Tarnowski – engineering
- Jim Houghton, Robert Alford, Ron Pownall – photography
- Bruce Dickinson – 1999 reissue production
- Vic Anesini – remastering
- Howard Fritzson – 1999 reissue art direction
- Gary Graff – 1999 reissue liner notes

== Charts ==
Chart (1977)	Peak position
Australia Albums (Kent Music Report)	90
Canada Top Albums/CDs (RPM)	25
Swedish Albums (Sverigetopplistan)	14
UK Albums (Official Charts)	28
US Billboard 200	17

== Certifications ==
Region	Certification	Certified units/sales
Canada (Music Canada)	Platinum	100,000^{^}
United States (RIAA)	3× Platinum	3,000,000^{^}
^{^} Shipments figures based on certification alone.
