= Yank Me, Crank Me =

Single by Ted Nugent

from the album Double Live Gonzo!
- Released: March 1978
- Recorded: Taylor County Coliseum, Abilene, Texas, November 1977
- Genre: Hard rock, heavy metal
- Length: 4:29
- Label: Epic
- Songwriter(s): Ted Nugent
- Producer(s): Ric Browde

Ted Nugent singles chronology
"Home Bound" (1977)	"Yank Me, Crank Me" (1978)	"Need You Bad" (1978)

"Yank Me, Crank Me" is a song written and recorded by American rock musician Ted Nugent from his live album Double Live Gonzo!, the main riff sounds like Tush by ZZ Top

== Chart positions ==
Chart (1978)	Peak position
Canadian RPM Top Singles	56
U.S. Billboard Hot 100	58
