= Dog Eat Dog (Ted Nugent song) =

Single by Ted Nugent

from the album Free-for-All
- B-side: "I Love You So I Told You A Lie" (UK)
- Released: November 1976
- Studio: The Sound Pit, Atlanta, Georgia
- Genre: Hard rock
- Length: 4:04 (album); 3:21 (single)
- Label: Epic
- Songwriter: Ted Nugent
- Producers: Tom Werman, Lew Futterman, Cliff Davies

Ted Nugent singles chronology
"Hey Baby" (1976)	"Dog Eat Dog" (1976)	"Free-for-All" (1976)

"Dog Eat Dog" is a song written and recorded by American hard rock musician Ted Nugent for the album Free-for-All (1976). It was released as a single in November 1976 and peaked on the Billboard Hot 100 at No. 91.

== Cover versions ==
- The band American Dog performed a version of the song live for their album Unfinished Business at Route 33 Rhythm and Brews, Wapakoneta, Ohio.
- In 2001, the guitarist Jake E. Lee and vocalist Jizzy Pearl performed a cover of the song which has appeared on cover compilation albums.

== Charts ==
Chart (1976)	Peak position
US Billboard Hot 100	91

== Personnel ==
- Derek St. Holmes – main vocals, guitar
- Ted Nugent – guitar
- Rob Grange – bass
- Cliff Davies – drums, backing vocals
