= Cliff Davies (musician) =

British drummer (1948–2008)

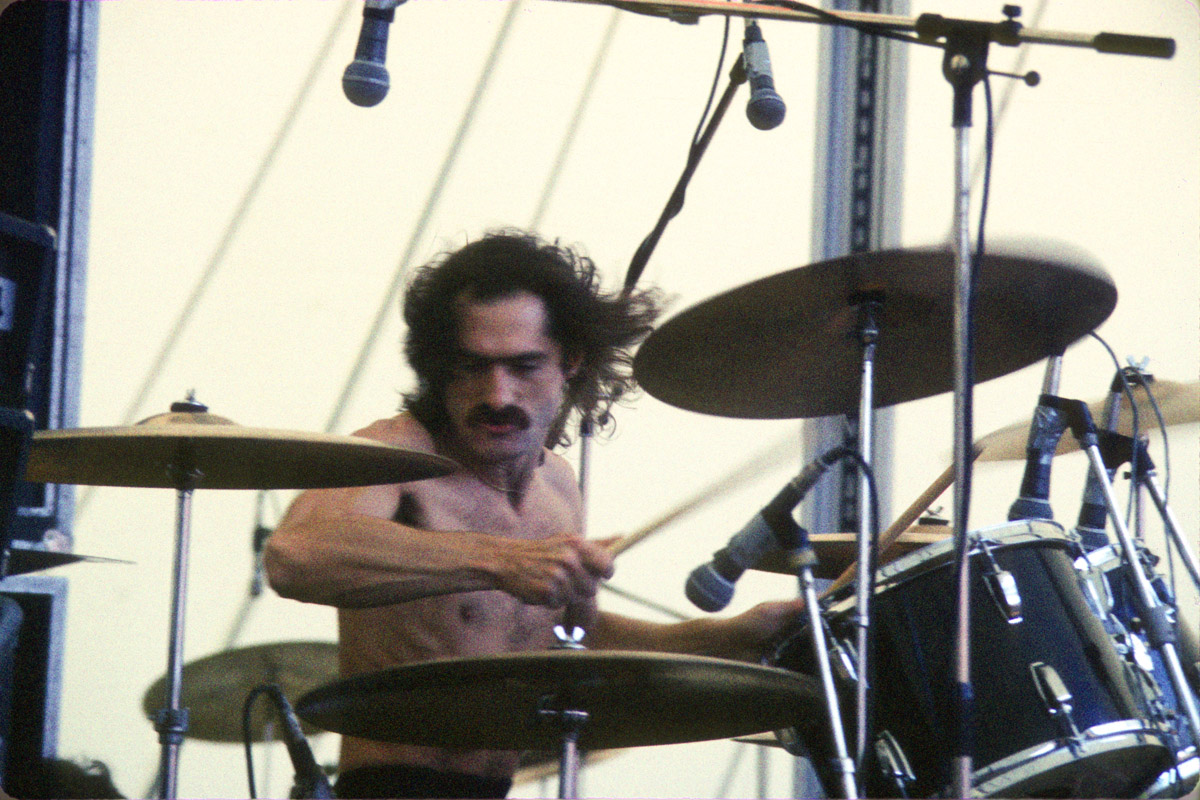
- Davies in 1978

Background information
- Born: 1948
- Origin: England
- Died: 2008 (aged 59–60) Atlanta, Georgia, US
- Genres: Rock, hard rock
- Occupations: Drummer, producer
- Formerly of: Roy Young Band, If, Ted Nugent

Cliff Davies (c. 1948 – 13 April 2008) was a British drummer.

== Career ==
=== If ===
After receiving tuition from pipe band drummer Jock Cree and playing local gigs in the Aldershot area, in the early 70s Davies went on to join the Roy Young Band and then the second incarnation of the jazz-rock band If from 1972 to 1975. He played on four albums by the band and contributed many of their songs.

=== Ted Nugent ===
Following If's break-up, Davies joined American hard rock guitarist Ted Nugent from 1975 to 1982 as drummer and co-producer of all Nugent's recordings over those years, in collaboration with Lew Futterman, who had also produced If.

In 1975, Nugent dropped The Amboy Dukes name and the band became The Ted Nugent Band. The other members did not want to be considered a backing band and one of the conditions of Derek St. Holmes joining them was it would be treated like a collective band. They toured as The Ted Nugent Band and, in 1975, after Davies joined the band on drums, they went into the studio to do their first album, which at the time was unnamed, for Epic Records. Davies was instrumental in organizing and producing the album (and provided lead vocals on the track "You Make Me Feel Right at Home"), which later went multi-platinum. He was never given full credit for producing this album. Ted Nugent mentioned that Cliff Davies was the singer of "Stormtroopin" on the Ted Nugent YouTube channel "My Son Rocco Is Documenting My Insane Life" 12/11/2025 Time Stamp 10 minutes 36 seconds.

At this point, David Krebs of Leber & Krebs Management convinced Nugent to drop "Band" from the title and just call it "Ted Nugent". By 1978, three years later and with four platinum albums titled Ted Nugent, Free-for-All, Cat Scratch Fever and Double Live Gonzo!, bassist Rob Grange moved on to form St. Paradise, because Nugent did not want a "band concept". Their last concert together as the original line-up was Cal Jam 2 on 18 March 1978.

In the 1980s, Davies worked for Next City Productions in New York City, also owned by Futterman, recording with Grand Funk Railroad among others. Since the late 1990s, he lived in Atlanta teaching piano and drums. He was also instrumental in founding the Rock and Roll Remembers Foundation with writer Michael Robert Krikorian.

== Death ==
Davies was found dead in his home in Atlanta on 13 April 2008; he died from a self-inflicted gunshot wound. Reed Beaver, the owner of Equametric Studio where Davies was employed as chief engineer, reported that Davies called him the night before his body was found and was "extremely distraught" over medical bills.

== Discography ==
=== With If ===
- Waterfall (1972)
- Double Diamond (1973) – also released in Germany as This is If
- Not Just Another Bunch of Pretty Faces (1974)
- Tea Break Over, Back on Your 'Eads (1975)

=== With Ted Nugent ===
- Ted Nugent
- Free-for-All
- Cat Scratch Fever
- Double Live Gonzo (live album)
- Weekend Warriors
- State of Shock
- Scream Dream
- Intensities in 10 Cities (live album)

=== Other recordings ===
- Whitehorn (1974) – Geoff Whitehorn
- In the Red (1983) – Fist
- Today is Tomorrow's Yesterday (2008) – The Unknown Heros of Rock
