= Stranglehold (Ted Nugent song) =

Song by Ted Nugent

from the album Ted Nugent
- Released: September 1975
- Recorded: 1975
- Genre: Hard rock; heavy metal
- Length: 8:26
- Label: Epic
- Songwriters: Ted Nugent; Rob Grange; Derek St. Holmes
- Producers: Tom Werman; Lew Futterman

Audio
- "Stranglehold on YouTube

"Stranglehold" is a song by American rock musician Ted Nugent. Originating as a jam session, it was later recorded as the first track from his self-titled debut 1975 album. It came to be regarded very highly as a classic and a signature song of Nugent's.

== Background ==
Nugent recalled "It goes all the way back to 1968, when I got on stage with Steve 'Muruga' Booker and John Sauter at a church after playing with the Amboy Dukes at the Grande Ballroom." During the jam session, he started recording on a cassette and started playing the main riff, which he called "basically a bastardized Bo Diddley lick, with a little bit more grunt and grind and groove and, dare I say, sexuality." He then started using the jam as an encore with The Amboy Dukes, developing it over time before recording it with Derek St. Holmes, Cliff Davies, and Rob Grange. The vocals are by Holmes, with the "Sometimes you wanna get higher" verse sung by Nugent. Nugent admits that the song was co-written by Grange, who received no share.

Epic Records initially rejected the song for being a jam session without a chorus, but capitulated when Nugent protested and pointed out that people enjoyed the jam live. The song was then recorded in one take.

Producer Tom Werman recalls "Stranglehold" being the first song he mixed. He created duets and echoes by recording what Nugent played and playing them back in time with him. This led to Nugent telling him on the phone, "I really like what you did with ‘Stranglehold.’ But don’t EVER do anything like that again without getting my permission first!"

== Reception ==
"Stranglehold" has been deemed a "classic", with Loudwire calling it "Nugent's signature song". Ultimate Classic Rock ranked it as the best Ted Nugent song and the 24th best classic rock song of all time, calling it Ted Nugent's "Stairway to Heaven" and "one of rock's most famous, stuttering and funky guitar riffs". Its solo was ranked as the 31st greatest guitar solo of all time by Guitar World.

It became an entrance theme to the NHL team Chicago Blackhawks. It was also the entrance theme used by Kevin Von Erich in his professional wrestling career. During his tenure with the San Diego Padres, relief pitcher Huston Street used the song as his entrance music. Current Pittsburgh Pirates player Ryan O'Hearn uses the song as his walk up song for every at bat. Relief pitcher Will Smith also used the song as his entrance music when he pitched for the Atlanta Braves.

Pearl Jam covered the song during a show at the CFG Bank Arena in September 2024, but altered the lyrics be anti-gun. Nugent, a gun advocate, responded by tweeting "Hey Eddie, join me on my RAV Spirit Campfire to discuss how your insane liberal policies have created an explosion in engineered violent recidivism while you fight to disarm helpless innocent citizens."

== See also ==
- Ted Nugent discography
