= Free-for-All (Ted Nugent album) =

Studio album by Ted Nugent
- Released: September 1976
- Studios: The Sound Pit, Atlanta, Georgia
- Genre: Hard rock
- Length: 38:28
- Label: Epic
- Producers: Tom Werman, Lew Futterman, Cliff Davies

Ted Nugent chronology
Ted Nugent (1975)	Free-for-All (1976)	Cat Scratch Fever (1977)

Singles from Free-for All
- 1. "Dog Eat Dog" Released: November 1976; 2. "Free-for-All" Released: 1977

Professional ratings
Review scores
Source	Rating
AllMusic	3.5/5 stars
Classic Rock	4/5 stars
Christgau's Record Guide	B−
Collector's Guide to Heavy Metal	9/10
Rolling Stone	(favorable)

Free-for-All is the second studio album by American rock musician Ted Nugent. It was released in September 1976 by Epic Records, and was his first album to go platinum.

== Background ==
As the recording of Free-for-All commenced, rhythm guitarist and lead vocalist Derek St. Holmes left the band, citing growing personal and creative conflicts with Nugent. Two solid years of living together on the road had taken its toll on the relationship. Additionally, St. Holmes was unhappy with Tom Werman's production, saying that the producer was watering down the band's sound.

A full year before Bat Out of Hell brought him international success, vocalist Meat Loaf was brought in by producer Werman to sing on the album. Meat Loaf was paid the sum of $1,000 for his contributions to the album, which included crafting his vocal arrangements and two days of recording sessions. He says that after he agreed to do the album he was sent a lyric sheet containing just the words with no arrangements. Having no idea what the songs were going to sound like, he then created the vocal arrangements for the songs during the two days of recording.

St. Holmes also sang lead vocal on several of the album's songs, including the single "Dog Eat Dog". He officially returned to the group after Free-for-All's release, and performed on the subsequent tour. Band management asked him to return at the request of Epic Records.

== Track listing ==
All songs written by Ted Nugent, except where noted; all songs arranged by Nugent, Rob Grange, Derek St. Holmes and Cliff Davies.

Side one
No.	Title	Lead vocals	Length
1.	"Free-for-All"	Ted Nugent	3:20
2.	"Dog Eat Dog"	Derek St. Holmes	4:04
3.	"Writing on the Wall"	Meat Loaf	7:08
4.	"Turn It Up"	Derek St. Holmes	3:36

Side two
No.	Title	Writer(s)	Lead vocals	Length
5.	"Street Rats"		Meat Loaf	3:36
6.	"Together"	Rob Grange, Cliff Davies	Meat Loaf	5:52
7.	"Light My Way"	Derek St. Holmes, Rob Grange	Derek St. Holmes	3:00
8.	"Hammerdown"		Meat Loaf	4:07
9.	"I Love You So I Told You a Lie"	Cliff Davies	Meat Loaf	3:47

1999 CD reissue bonus tracks
No.	Title	Lead vocals	Length
10.	"Free-for-All" (live)	Ted Nugent	5:13
11.	"Dog Eat Dog" (live)	Derek St. Holmes	6:21
12.	"Street Rats" (alternate version with Derek St. Holmes on vocals)	Derek St. Holmes	4:14

== Personnel ==
Band members

- Ted Nugent – lead and rhythm guitar, lead vocals (tracks 1 and 10), percussion, bass guitar (track 2)
- Meat Loaf – lead vocals and vocal arrangements (tracks 3, 5, 6, 8 and 9)
- Rob Grange – bass guitar, bass phase effects
- Cliff Davies – drums, percussion, backing vocals (track 2), producer

Additional musicians

- Derek St. Holmes (Note: Derek St. Holmes had left the band prior to this release, therefore his contributions would be considered additional personnel not band member.) – lead vocals (tracks 2, 4, 7, 11 and 12), rhythm guitar (tracks 2, 10 & 11)
- Steve McRay – keyboards, backing vocals
- Tom Werman – percussion, producer

Production

- Lew Futterman – producer
- Anthony Reale – engineer
- Josh Futterman – engineer's assistant
- Tim Geelan – mixing engineer
- Paula Scher – album design
- Jim Houghton – photography
- Bruce Dickinson – 1999 reissue producer
- Vic Anesini – remastering
- Stephan Moore – 1999 reissue project director
- Howard Fritzson – 1999 reissue art director
- Gary Graff – 1999 reissue liner notes

== Charts ==
Chart (1976–1977)	Peak position
Australia Albums (Kent Music Report)	84
Canada Top Albums/CDs (RPM)	31
Swedish Albums (Sverigetopplistan)	14
UK Albums (Official Charts)	33
US Billboard 200	24

== Certifications ==
Region	Certification	Certified units/sales
Canada (Music Canada)	Gold	50,000^{^}
United States (RIAA)	2× Platinum	2,000,000^{^}
^{^} Shipments figures based on certification alone.
