= Cat Scratch Fever (song) =

1977 single by Ted Nugent

Single by Ted Nugent

from the album Cat Scratch Fever
- B-side: "A Thousand Knives" (EU); "Wang Dang Sweet Poontang" (US)
- Released: July 1977
- Recorded: 1977
- Genre: Hard rock
- Length: 3:38 (album version); 3:04 (single version)
- Label: Epic
- Songwriter: Ted Nugent

Ted Nugent singles chronology
"Dog Eat Dog" (1976)	"Cat Scratch Fever" (1977)	"Home Bound" (1977)

"Cat Scratch Fever" is a song by American rock musician Ted Nugent from his album of the same name. The song is well known for its signature riff, which is a 3-tone minor-key melody harmonized in parallel fourths. In 2009, it was named the 32nd-best hard rock song of all time by VH1.

== Chart positions ==
Chart (1977)	Peak position
Canadian RPM Top Singles	37
U.S. Billboard Hot 100	30

== Pantera cover ==
"Cat Scratch Fever"

Promotional single by Pantera

from the album Detroit Rock City: Music from the Motion Picture
- Released: 1999
- Genre: Heavy metal; hard rock
- Length: 3:48
- Label: PolyGram
- Songwriter: Ted Nugent

Pantera singles chronology
"Where You Come From" (1997)	"Cat Scratch Fever" (1999)	"Revolution Is My Name" (2000)

The tune was covered by heavy metal band Pantera for Detroit Rock City's CD soundtrack. Their version peaked at 40 on the Mainstream Rock chart. Nugent criticized the version, claiming, "It was exceedingly white. No soul, no balls, no feel. Caucasian all the way."

=== Charts ===
Chart (1999)	Peak position
US Mainstream Rock (Billboard)	40
