= Ted Nugent =

American rock musician (born 1948)

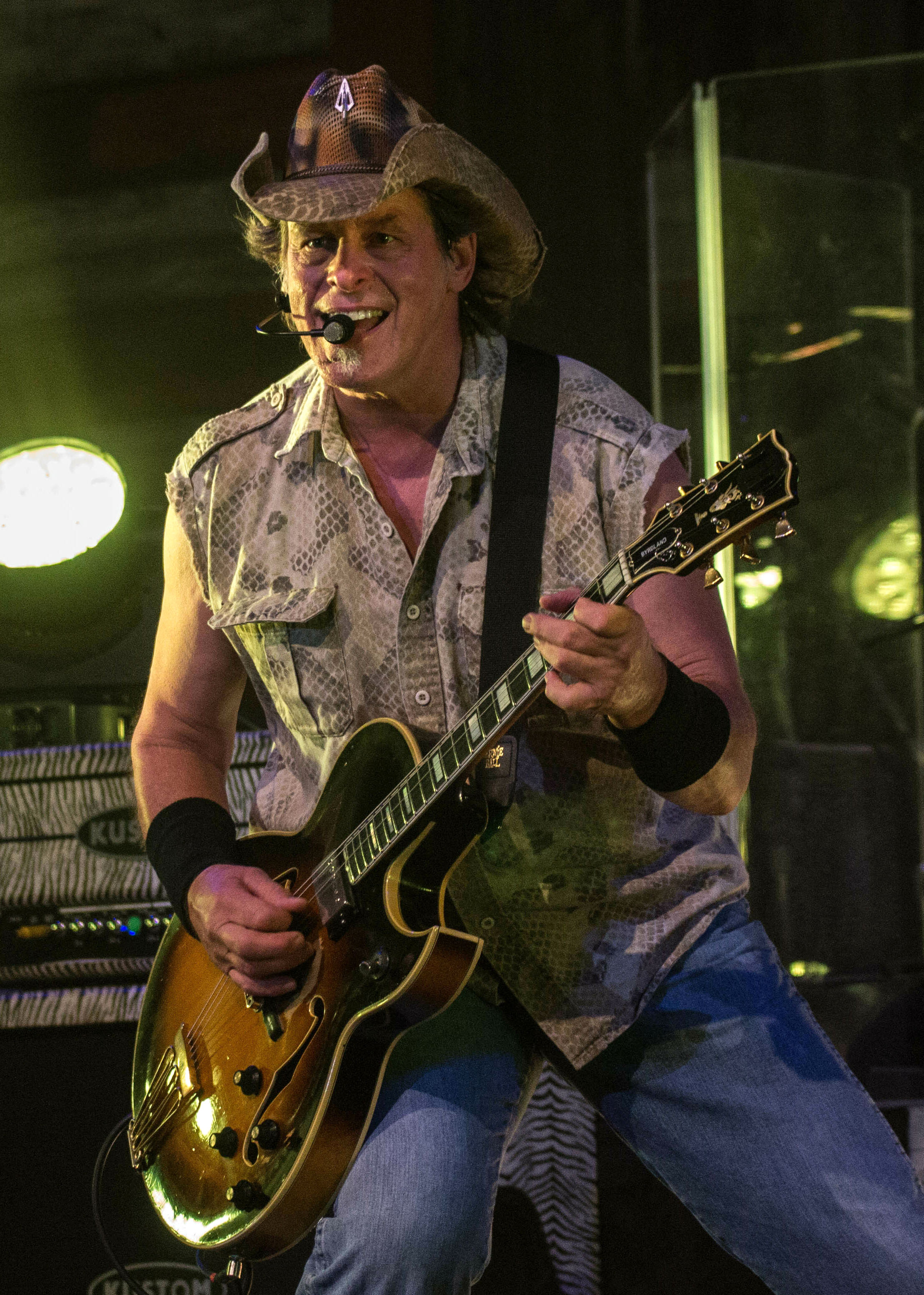
- Nugent performing at the Redneck Country Club in Stafford, Texas, July 2017

Background information
- Also known as: The Nuge; Motor City Madman; Uncle Ted
- Born: Theodore Anthony Nugent; December 13, 1948 (age 77); Detroit, Michigan, U.S.
- Genre: Hard rock
- Occupations: Musician; songwriter; political activist
- Instruments: Guitar; vocals
- Works: Discography
- Years active: 1963–present
- Formerly of: The Amboy Dukes; Damn Yankees; Damnocracy
- Website: tednugent.com
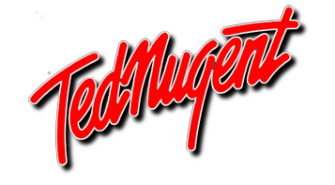

Theodore Anthony Nugent (/ˈnuːdʒɪnt/; born December 13, 1948) is an American guitarist, singer, and songwriter. He goes by several nicknames, including Uncle Ted, the Nuge, and Motor City Madman. Nugent initially gained fame as the lead guitarist and occasional vocalist of the Amboy Dukes, a band formed in 1963 that played psychedelic rock and hard rock. After dissolving the band, he embarked on a successful solo career. His first three solo albums, Ted Nugent (1975), Free-for-All (1976) and Cat Scratch Fever (1977), as well as the live album Double Live Gonzo! (1978), were certified multi-platinum in the United States. His latest album, Detroit Muscle, was released in 2022. In 2023, he embarked on a farewell tour known as the "Adios Mofo Tour"; however, he has since continued to perform.

Nugent is known for his use of the Gibson Byrdland, his bluesy and frenzied guitar playing, and his energetic live shows. Despite possessing a distinctive, wide-ranging singing voice, Nugent recorded and toured with other lead singers during much of his early solo career, including Derek St. Holmes, Charlie Huhn, Brian Howe and Meat Loaf, only taking on full lead vocal duties later on. His biggest hit was 1977's "Cat Scratch Fever", on which he sang the lead vocals. In the late 1980s and early 1990s, he was part of the supergroup Damn Yankees.

Since the 2000s, Nugent has drawn attention for his outspoken conservative political views and his vociferous advocacy of hunting and gun ownership rights. He was a board member of the National Rifle Association and is a strong supporter of the Republican Party. He has made a number of threatening statements against advocates of gun control; in one case, the Secret Service investigated him based on his comments about Barack Obama. Since 2015, Nugent has been one of Donald Trump's most outspoken supporters, and has performed at several of Trump's rallies and campaign events.

== Early life ==
Nugent was born in 1948 in Detroit, Michigan, the second of four children born to Marion Dorothy (née Johnson) and Warren Henry Nugent. His maternal grandparents were Swedish. He grew up in Redford, Michigan. In 1965, Warren was transferred to the Chicago, Illinois area, where Ted attended St. Viator High School in Arlington Heights.

=== Draft status ===
Nugent grew up in a military family; his father was a career army sergeant. Nugent himself never served in the military, although he came of age during the height of the Vietnam War. In 1977 and 1990 interviews with High Times magazine and the Detroit Free Press, Nugent claimed he deliberately failed his draft physical by eating nothing but junk food for days beforehand, and urinating and defecating in the same pair of pants for one week.

Nugent denied this story in a 2018 appearance on The Joe Rogan Experience, claiming that he invented the story for his and his band's amusement, because news sources at the time often published inaccurate information about them, and that he wanted to mess with the "dirtbag" and "hippie" writers of High Times (a marijuana-themed magazine), because he was "hardcore anti-drug". He further asserted to Rogan that in 1969 he passed his draft physical "with flying colors", and denied that he was given a 4-F draft classification.

Nugent's claims to Rogan are contradicted by his Selective Service record. According to these records, he was given student deferments while attending Oakland Community College, and upon leaving the school received a draft rating of I-A, before failing his draft physical on August 28, 1969. After that physical, he was rated 1-Y ("registrant qualified for service only in time of war or national emergency") until that classification was abolished in 1971. He was subsequently reclassified 4-F, indicating ineligibility for military service due to not meeting physical, mental, or moral standards.

== Musical career ==
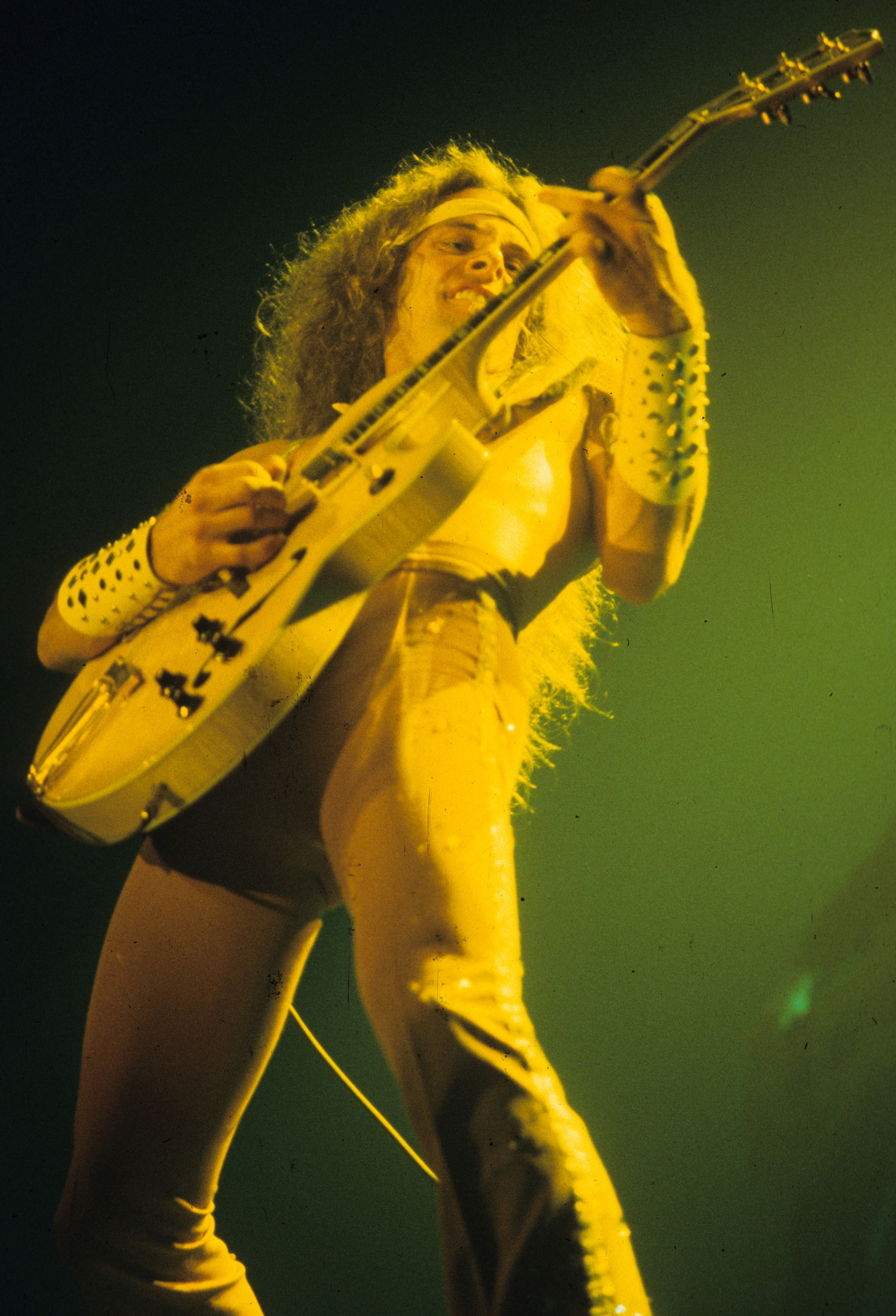
Nugent in concert with his signature Gibson Byrdland guitar

Nugent's influences include Chuck Berry, Bo Diddley, and Little Richard.

=== The Amboy Dukes ===
The first lineup of the Amboy Dukes played at The Cellar, a teen dance club outside of Chicago in Arlington Heights, Illinois, starting in late 1965, while Nugent was a student at St. Viator High School. The Cellar's "house band" at the time had been the Shadows of Knight, although the Amboy Dukes eventually became a staple until the club's closing.

The Amboy Dukes' second single was "Journey to the Center of the Mind", which featured lyrics written by the Dukes' second guitarist Steve Farmer from the album of the same title whose cover features a diverse array of drug paraphernalia. Nugent, an ardent anti-drug campaigner, has always claimed that he had no idea that this song was about drug use. Early albums The Amboy Dukes (1967), Journey to the Center of the Mind (1968) and Migration (1969)—all recorded on the Mainstream label—sold moderately well. On April 7, 1968, shortly after the assassination of Martin Luther King Jr., Nugent joined other musicians in a tribute to King by having a folk, rock and blues jam session. Joni Mitchell played first, followed by Buddy Guy, Janis Joplin, B. B. King, The Paul Butterfield Blues Band, Richie Havens and Jimi Hendrix. Other musicians who participated were B. B. King and Al Kooper.

After settling down on a ranch in Michigan in 1973, Nugent signed a record deal with Frank Zappa's DiscReet Records label and recorded Call of the Wild under the revised band name Ted Nugent and the Amboy Dukes. The following year, Tooth Fang & Claw (which contained the song "Great White Buffalo") established a fan base for Nugent and the other Amboy Dukes. Personnel changes at this time nearly wrecked the band. Nugent reunited with the other members of the Amboy Dukes at the 2009 Detroit Music Awards, which took place April 17, 2009. The psychedelic band received a distinguished achievement honor at the event. The Dukes also played together at the ceremony, marking their first public performance in more than 30 years.

=== Solo career ===
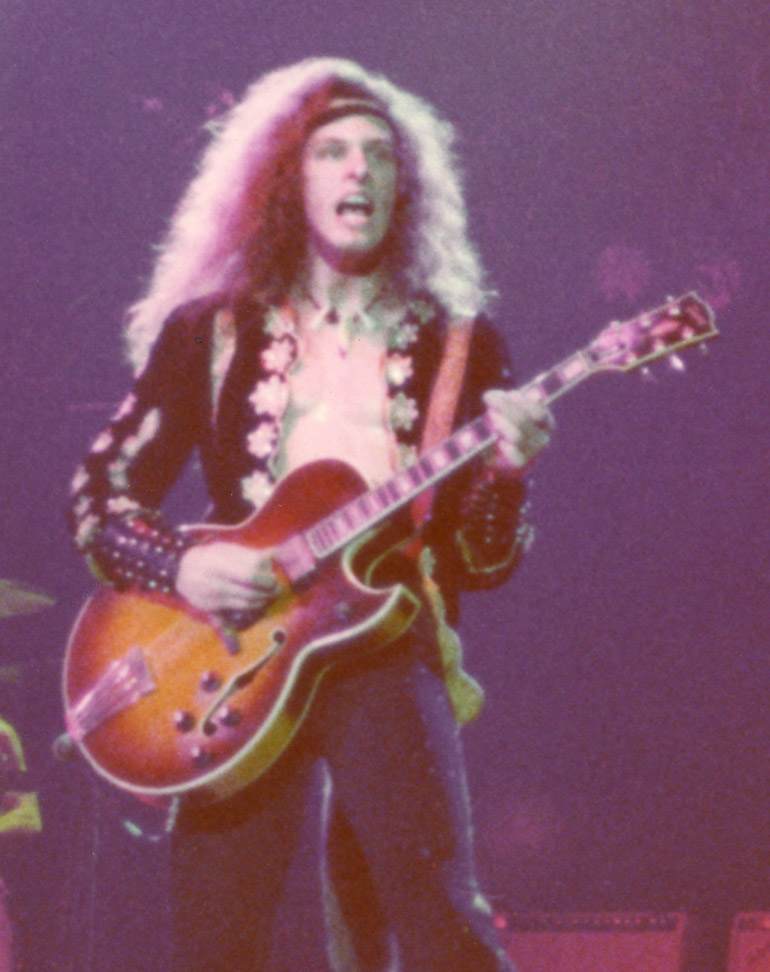
Nugent performing in 1979

Nugent dropped the Amboy Dukes band name for good in 1975 and signed to Epic Records. Retaining only bassist Rob Grange from the previous Amboy Dukes lineup, Nugent added Derek St. Holmes (guitar, vocals) and Clifford Davies (drums). This quartet remained the primary band members for Nugent's 1970s multi-platinum albums: Ted Nugent (1975), Free-for-All (1976) and Cat Scratch Fever (1977). These albums produced the popular radio anthems "Hey Baby", "Stranglehold", "Dog Eat Dog" and "Cat Scratch Fever". Despite most of the songwriting credits being listed as solely Nugent, St. Holmes claims that many were co-written by the whole band and that Nugent took sole credit as a way to avoid paying them royalties.

It was during these three years that Nugent emerged as a guitar hero to hard rock fans, many of whom were unaware of his lengthy apprenticeship with the Amboy Dukes. This band lineup toured extensively, also releasing the multi-platinum live album Double Live Gonzo! (1978), until its breakup in 1978 when St. Holmes and Grange departed. St. Holmes was replaced by Charlie Huhn and Grange by multiple bassists, with Nugent eventually settling on Dave Kiswiney for a three-album stretch in the 1980s. Davies left around 1982 after staying on to record Weekend Warriors (1978), State of Shock (1979) and Scream Dream (1980), all three of which charted in the US Top 25, plus the live album Intensities in 10 Cities (1981). The Intensities in 10 Cities album includes the controversial song "Jailbait".

On July 8, 1979, Ted was on the rock radio program King Biscuit Flower Hour. This was the original broadcast of Ted's performance of Live at Hammersmith '79 which had been recorded during the second set of a night at London's Hammersmith Odeon in 1979. An album of this program was released in 1997.

=== 1980s solo career and Damn Yankees ===
During the period of 1982–1988, Nugent released four more solo albums (to declining critical favor and commercial performance) and also began assuming a more prominent role as lead vocalist. In 1989, he joined the supergroup Damn Yankees, with Jack Blades (bass/vocals, of Night Ranger), Tommy Shaw (guitar/vocals, of Styx) and Michael Cartellone (drums). Damn Yankees (1990) was a hit album, going double platinum in the U.S., thanks to the hit power ballad "High Enough". The second and final Damn Yankees album, Don't Tread (1992), reached gold status in the U.S., but was not as well-received as the band's debut and the group dissolved soon after.

=== Return to solo career ===
Returning to a solo career, Nugent released Spirit of the Wild in 1995, his best-reviewed album in quite some time. The album contained the bowhunting anthem "Fred Bear", and also marked the return of Derek St. Holmes to Nugent's studio band. A series of archival releases also came out in the 1990s, keeping Nugent's name in the national consciousness. He also began hosting a radio show in Detroit on WWBR-FM ("102.7 The Bear, Detroit's Rock Animal") and took ownership in several hunting-related businesses. He created TV shows for several networks: Wanted: Ted or Alive on Versus, Ted Nugent Spirit of the Wild on PBS and The Outdoor Channel, and Surviving Nugent and Supergroup-Damnocracy on VH1. In 2006, Nugent was voted into the Michigan Rock and Roll Legends Hall of Fame.

Ted Nugent appears on David Crowder Band's 2007 release, Remedy, playing guitar on the song "We Won't Be Quiet". He announced his "Trample the Weak, Hurdle the Dead" tour on April 21, 2010.

Nugent toured with local Detroit musician Alex Winston during the summers of 2007 and 2008.

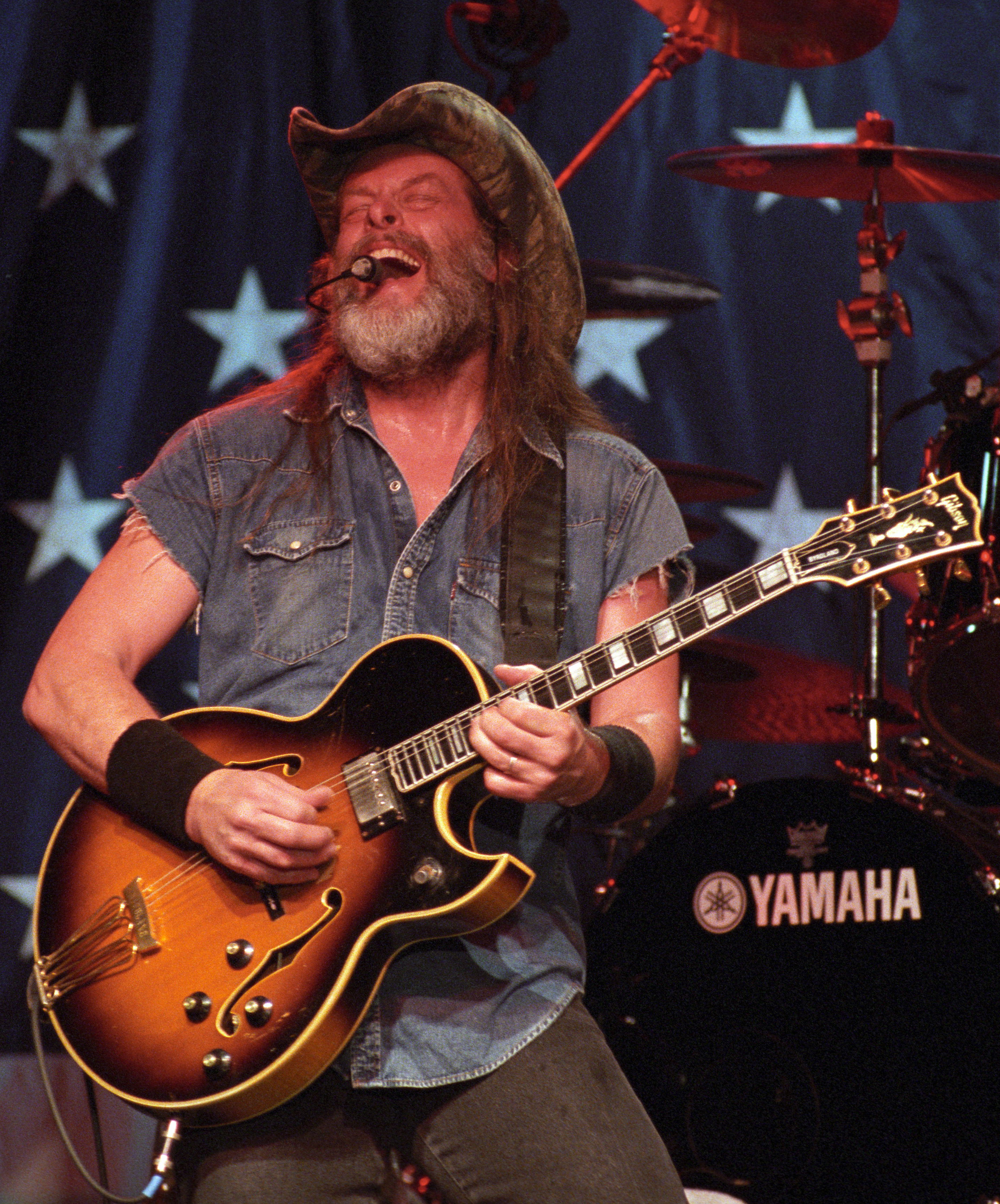
Nugent performing in 2005

On July 4, 2008, at the DTE Energy Music Theater in Clarkston, Michigan, Ted Nugent played his 6,000th concert. Derek St. Holmes (original singer for the Ted Nugent band), Johnny Bee Badanjek (drummer for Mitch Ryder and The Detroit Wheels) and Nugent's guitar teacher from 1958, Joe Podorsek, all jammed on stage with Nugent for various songs.

Nugent appeared as video game character in the 2008 game Guitar Hero World Tour. As part of the "solo guitar career" section, the player engages in a guitar duel with Nugent, after which his song "Stranglehold" is unlocked and Nugent becomes available as a playable character.

On March 14, 2011, Nugent released a new song, "I Still Believe", as a free download via his website to subscribers to his newsletter. Nugent says of the song: "America is a target-rich environment for an independent man addicted to logic, truth and The American Way. 'I Still Believe' throttles the animal spirit of rugged individualism in pure MotorCity ultra high-energy rhythm and blues and rock and roll." In April 2011 Nugent announced that former frontman Derek St. Holmes would be joining his band for Nugent's I Still Believe Tour.

On April 13, 2023, Nugent announced that his upcoming "Adios Mofo" tour would be his last, stating that "the logistics are just too complicated" in reference to being away from his dogs and grandchildren. However, he will continue to record music.

=== Influence ===
Nugent has been cited as a key influence in the straight edge movement, a punk rock-associated lifestyle that developed in the early 1980s and discourages drug and alcohol use. Henry Rollins, former vocalist for Black Flag and Rollins Band, said he and Ian MacKaye, former vocalist for Minor Threat and Fugazi (and coiner of the term "straight edge" from his song of the same title), were inspired by Nugent during their high school years in the 1970s. Rollins has been quoted as saying, "[We] would read about the Nuge and the thing that really rubbed off on us was the fact that he didn't drink or smoke or do drugs ... [Nugent's performance] was the craziest thing we'd ever seen onstage and here's this guy saying, 'I don't get high.' We thought that was so impressive."

He has also been cited as an influence to Guns N' Roses guitarist Slash, Stone Temple Pilots bassist Robert DeLeo, and Brother Cane guitarists Damon Johnson and Dave Anderson.

Several notable artists have covered Nugent's songs, including the Ramones version of "Journey to the Center of the Mind" on their album Acid Eaters, and Pantera and Motörhead versions of "Cat Scratch Fever". Nugent expressed a love for all three artists, but criticized their covers for a lack of soulfulness, calling them "just too caucasian". On September 12, 2024, Pearl Jam covered "Stranglehold" during a live show, but with lyrics changed to be anti-gun. In response to this, Nugent invited Pearl Jam singer Eddie Vedder to appear on his television show, Spirit Campfire, and discuss gun policies.

== Television and movie appearances ==
=== Reality TV ===
Nugent has starred in several reality shows, including his own outdoors television show on the Outdoor Channel, named after his popular song "Spirit of the Wild", since 2001. The song was the theme music to the TV series, in which Nugent took viewers on a variety of wild game hunts using his bow. In the series, he taught and advised hunters and "hands-on" conservationists around the world on the different aspects of hunting and politics. In one episode of Spirit of the Wild, Nugent hits a young deer with a bow. Two game wardens saw the episode, later charging Nugent with 11 misdemeanor violations of California hunting law. Nugent pleaded guilty to two violations.

In 2003, he was host of the VH1 reality television program Surviving Nugent, in which city dwellers moved in to Nugent's Michigan ranch. During filming, Nugent injured himself with a chainsaw, requiring 40 stitches and a leg brace.

In 2005, Nugent hosted a reality-type show, Wanted: Ted or Alive, on what was then called the OLN, or Outdoor Life Network, before it became the NBC Sports Network. In Wanted: Ted or Alive, contestants competed for money and opportunities to go hunting with "Uncle Ted". The contestants had to kill and clean their own food to survive.

In 2006, he appeared on VH1's reality show SuperGroup, with Anthrax guitarist Scott Ian, Biohazard bassist Evan Seinfeld, ex-Skid Row lead singer Sebastian Bach and John Bonham's son Jason Bonham, who had been the drummer for Bonham, UFO and Foreigner. The name of the supergroup was originally FIST but later was changed to Damnocracy. Bach had lobbied for the name Savage Animal. Captured on film by VH1 was a rare Nugent duet with guitarist Joe Bonamassa at the Sand Dollar Blues Room for a 45-minute blues jam. He starred in another reality show for CMT in August 2009. The show, titled Runnin' Wild ... From Ted Nugent, featured Nugent instructing competitors in the art of survival; the competitors had to use those skills in challenges in which Nugent himself hunted them down.

In 2008, Nugent was a guest on the episode Southwest Road Trip Special of Anthony Bourdain: No Reservations, where he spoke against obesity and public health care.

=== Acting ===
In 1986, he guest-starred in an episode of the hit television show Miami Vice entitled "Definitely Miami", playing a villain. His song "Angry Young Man" was featured in the episode. His song "Little Miss Dangerous" was also featured on a Miami Vice episode of the same name, although he did not appear in the episode.

In 2001, Nugent appeared as himself in a third-season episode of That '70s Show entitled "Backstage Pass".

Also in 2001, Nugent appeared as himself in the second episode of the short-lived university campus FOX comedy series Undeclared. In the episode "Full Bluntal Nugety", Nugent is a guest at the university, there to speak on his favorite topics, mainly hunting and gun control. FOX did not like the idea of Nugent and his political views appearing on this show, so the episode was re-shot and re-edited as "Oh, So You Have a Boyfriend?" which aired without any Ted Nugent content whatsoever. The complete "Full Bluntal Nugety (Director's Cut)" episode is available in its entirety in the Undeclared DVD box set, including some extra Ted Nugent scenes that had been deleted.

Nugent made a guest appearance on the television series Aqua Teen Hunger Force, in the episode "Gee Whiz", on Adult Swim.

In 2007, Nugent appeared in the music video for Nickelback's song "Rockstar". The same year, Nugent debated The Simpsons producer Sam Simon on The Howard Stern Show about the ethics of hunting animals. Coincidentally, Nugent would later lend his voice to an over-the-phone appearance in the season 19 episode of The Simpsons, "I Don't Wanna Know Why the Caged Bird Sings", where, in a humorous jab at his political stance, inmate Dwight picks up his call for voting no to the fictional Proposition 87, which bans crossbows in public schools. As part of his pre-recorded message, Nugent asks "If we outlaw crossbows in our public schools, who's going to protect our children from charging elk?".

Nugent made his feature film debut in 2008 in the Toby Keith film Beer for My Horses, playing the role of Skunk, a "long-haired, over-the-top rock 'n' roll deputy sheriff in Jackson County, Oklahoma, who loves bowhunting and guns".

In 2012, Nugent again appeared as himself on The Simpsons, on the episode "Politically Inept, with Homer Simpson", in which he is nominated as a presidential candidate for the Republican Party.

== Personal life ==
Nugent is a fan of the Detroit Red Wings in ice hockey, Detroit Pistons in basketball, Detroit Lions in football, and Detroit Tigers in baseball. In 2021, Nugent auctioned over 400 items from his personal collection. The auction included his 1958 and 1959 Gibson Les Paul guitars, a 1956 Fender Stratocaster, and several Gibson Byrdland guitars.

=== Family and relationships ===
Nugent has been married twice and has six children with four women. In the late 1960s, prior to his first marriage, Nugent fathered a boy and a girl, both of whom he gave up for adoption in their infancy. This did not become well known to the public until 2010. The siblings were adopted separately and had no contact with one another. The son learned the identity of his birth father in 2010, through the daughter's quest to make contact with him and their birth parents. According to a news report, over the years Nugent had discussed the existence of these children with his other children.

He was married to his first wife, Sandra Jezowski, from 1970 to 1979. They had two children, a son and a daughter. Jezowski died in a single-car crash in 1982.

His second wife is Shemane Deziel, whom he met while a guest on Detroit's WLLZ-FM, where she was a member of the news staff. They married on January 21, 1989. They have a son.

In 2005, Nugent agreed to pay $3,500 in monthly child support for a son fathered with a woman named Karen Gutowski while he was married to Deziel.

==== Relationships with underage girls ====
Nugent's 1981 song "Jailbait" describes statutory rape. In a Behind the Music episode, he admitted to having sex with underage girls on multiple occasions. In 2013, the musician Courtney Love said she had performed oral sex on Nugent at 14, and that there was a line of young girls waiting to engage in sexual acts.

In 1978, 29-year-old Nugent began a relationship with 17-year-old Hawaii native Pele Massa. On VH1's Behind the Music, Nugent said that Massa's parents approved of the relationship and preferred him to an alcoholic or a drug addict. It is alleged Nugent became or tried to become Massa's legal guardian with her parents' permission.

=== Health ===
Since the 1970s, Nugent has promoted anti-drug and anti-alcohol stances. He is a national spokesman for the Drug Abuse Resistance Education (DARE) program. In 2018, he admitted that he drinks "a little wine". Nugent has hearing loss. He said in a 2007 interview: "The ear's not too good, especially with background noise, but that's a small price to pay. Believe me, the journey was worth it."

== Politics ==
=== Political views ===
Nugent is a vocal supporter of the Republican Party and various associated conservative causes, particularly gun rights and hunter's rights. He is a supporter of President Donald Trump and has made a number of statements critical of former President Barack Obama, one of which was perceived as potentially threatening and led to Nugent being investigated by the Secret Service.

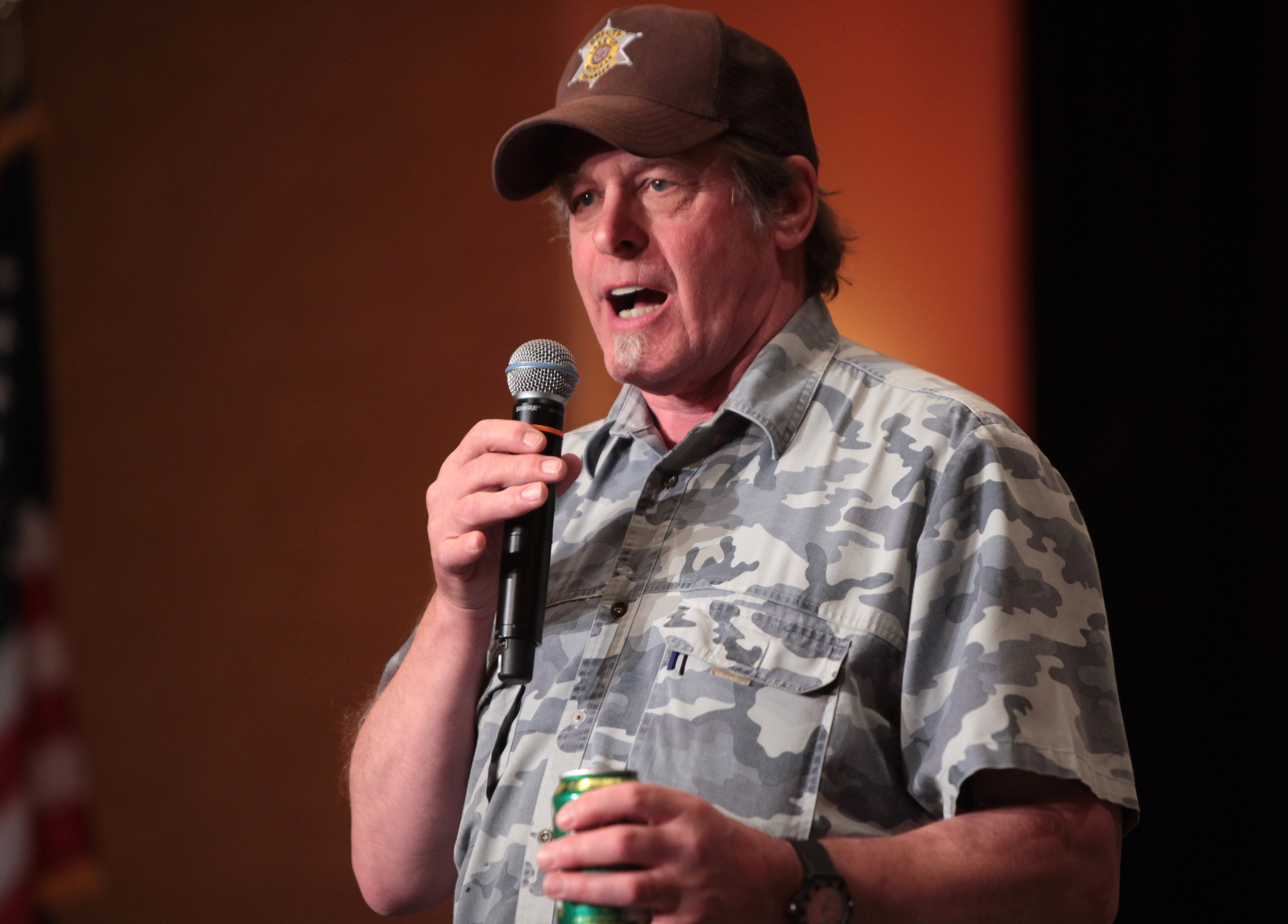
Nugent speaking at a campaign event for Sheriff Joe Arpaio in Scottsdale, Arizona

In addition to Nugent's support of Trump, he also endorsed Mitt Romney for president and Joe Arpaio for Sheriff of Maricopa County, in the 2012 U.S. elections. He also worked as the treasurer and co-chairman for Sid Miller's 2014 campaign for Texas Agriculture Commissioner.

Despite his support of Republicans, he has been critical of several Republican politicians, stating during the 2008 presidential election that John McCain was "catering to a growing segment of soulless Americans who care less what they can do for their country, but whine louder and louder about what their country must do for them." He also clashed in 2014 with Jay Dean, then the mayor of Longview, Texas and an incoming Republican member of the Texas House of Representatives after Dean moved to cancel Nugent's scheduled appearance at the Longview Independence Day concert. Dean said that he finds Nugent's music unsuitable for family-oriented audiences on July 4. Longview hence paid Nugent $16,000, half of the amount he had been promised, to drop him from the concert. Nugent in turn called Dean "racist" and "clueless, dishonest and one of the bad guys."

==== Animal rights ====
Nugent, an opponent of animal rights, said in a long interview, "I'm stymied to come up with anything funnier than people who think animals have rights. Just stick an arrow through their lungs." In a 1992 radio interview, Nugent referred to Heidi Prescott of the Fund for Animals as a "worthless whore" and a "shallow slut", asking "who needs to club a seal, when you can club Heidi?" He was ordered by a court to pay Prescott $75,000.

In 2000, Bhaskar Sinha was jailed briefly following an incident outside a department store in San Francisco in which he threatened and physically assaulted Nugent, who in turn took Sinha into custody until San Francisco Police arrived and arrested the protester. However, protesters claim that Nugent started the altercation by spitting in the face of one of the protesters when offered an anti-fur flyer. A San Francisco police officer, who stated that he was on the scene, said that he did not believe Nugent spat on anyone. Nugent has reportedly received death threats against him and his family from animal rights activists. On the Penn & Teller's Bullshit! episode about People for the Ethical Treatment of Animals (PETA), Nugent said, "We've got reports and files with law enforcement across America where the animal rights extremists are on record threatening to kill my children on the way to school because we eat pheasant."

Nugent defended Kid Rock, a fellow musician and hunter, when he killed a mountain lion in January 2015, calling the people who targeted Rock "braindead squawkers" and that Rock did good by keeping predator numbers low and helping the deer population, which is vital for hunting. In July 2015, Nugent referred to people outraged over the killing of Cecil the lion as "stupid".

Nugent owns a 340-acre hunting ranch near Jackson, Michigan, called Sunrize Acres. Anti-hunters claim this fenced facility offers "canned" hunts. Nugent has said, "I understand the criticism from those who say canned hunting violates the ethic of fair chase", though he still operates the facility and refers to it as "high fence hunting".

In April 2012, Nugent agreed to a plea deal to plead guilty to transporting an illegally killed American black bear in Alaska. His sentence included two years of probation, a prohibition on hunting and fishing in Alaska and on any U.S. Forest Service lands for one year and a fine of $10,000 and he was required to produce and broadcast at his own expense a 30–60 second Public Service Announcement (PSA) on the responsibilities of hunters. The judge in the case, Michael A. Thompson (Alaska), admitted in court that he had never heard of the law in which Nugent was charged. Nugent explained his side of the situation in an interview with Deer & Deer Hunting.

Nugent's views on animal rights have prompted criticism from fellow musicians such as Paul McCartney and John Feldmann. Feldmann wrote a song for his band Goldfinger, titled "Fuck Ted Nugent", on their album Open Your Eyes.

==== Civil rights ====
Nugent's views have been considered racist by some. In an interview in 1990, a few months after the release of Nelson Mandela during the negotiations to end apartheid in South Africa, Nugent stated, "apartheid isn't that cut-and-dry. All men are not created equal." He described black South Africans as "a different breed of man" who "still put bones in their noses, they still walk around naked, they wipe their butts with their hands".

In November 2008, coinciding with the election of Barack Obama as America's first black president, Nugent appeared on The Political Cesspool, a white nationalist radio show. In 2012, he stated, "I'm beginning to wonder if it would have been best had the South won the Civil War."

Nugent is also a staunch critic of Black Lives Matter, stating "Black Lives [Matter] don't give a shit about Black lives" and that they are a "terrorist organization".

During an interview with Piers Morgan in 2011, Nugent was asked if he would mind if one of his children came out as gay, saying "Not at all ... I'm repulsed at the concept of man-on-man sex, I think it's against nature. I think it's strange as hell, but if that's what you are, I love you. I'm not going to judge another's morals. I say live and let live. I have friends that are gay."

==== Environmentalism ====
Nugent has stated, "You have to have shit for brains to believe this global warming bullshit" and said people "have to be mentally ill to believe in electric vehicles".

At a 2009 West Virginia rally, sponsored in part by the coal extracting company Massey Energy, Nugent "defended mountaintop removal mining", according to reporters on the scene. "On behalf of the Nugent family, I say, start up the bulldozers and get me some more coal, Massey", Nugent was recorded as saying.

Nugent was a vocal opponent of a proposition to reintroduce gray wolves into Colorado passed in 2020. He urged Colorado citizens to vote against the proposition, which had widespread support from environmental groups.

==== Foreign policy ====
In 2004, while entertaining U.S. troops during the Iraq War, Nugent visited Saddam Hussein's former war room. He commented on Iraq, "Our failure has been not to Nagasaki them." In addition to Iraq, Nugent has criticized Islamic-run countries as a whole, calling Islam a "voodoo religion" that "believes in world domination".

While speaking at a rally for Donald Trump in 2023, Nugent shouted in regard to American support of Ukraine in the Russia-Ukraine War, "I want my money back, I didn't authorize any money to Ukraine, to some homosexual weirdo."

==== Gun rights ====
Nugent is an advocate of the right to bear arms, and served on the board of directors of the National Rifle Association (NRA). He has said "If it was up to me, if you uttered the word 'gun control,' we'd put you in jail." When interviewed by Texas Monthly editor Evan Smith in season 5 of TexasMonthlyTalks, he said, "I would rather that the [victim of a violent crime] in Massachusetts last month who was taking her daughter to soccer when they were carjacked by a recidivist maggot, who had been in the prison system all his life but was let out again because we feel sorry for him, maybe he had a bad childhood – instead of her being hijacked and murdered, I'd rather she just shot the bastard dead... But in Massachusetts, somebody decided she can't do that. So she's dead. I would rather she was alive and the carjacker was dead."

On July 9, 2010, Nugent was interviewed by Alex Jones and criticized the latest policies issued by the Obama administration and the U.S. Supreme Court concerning gun policy. He claimed that rejecting the idea of the right to self-defense being expressed in the Second Amendment to the United States Constitution, which Nugent called "gun control" policies, is most likely to destroy American society. Nugent also claimed similar policies were the cause of the downfall of every society in human history.

In 2016, Nugent posted an image on his Facebook page implying that Jews are behind the push for gun control. Nugent's rant sparked outrage and some called for his NRA resignation.

In March 2018, Nugent criticized the survivors of the Stoneman Douglas High School shooting who became gun control activists, calling them "mushy brained children" and stating that "the evidence is irrefutable: They have no soul."

In June 2018, Nugent said that "evil, dishonesty and scam artists have always been around and that right now they're liberal, they're Democrat, they're RINOs, they're Hollywood, they're fake news, they're media, they're academia and they're half of our government, at least ... There are rabid coyotes running around, you don't wait till you see one to go get your gun, keep your gun handy. And every time you see one, shoot one."

==== Healthcare ====
In 2008, Nugent was a guest on the episode Southwest Road Trip Special of Anthony Bourdain: No Reservations, where he spoke against obesity and public health care. Despite his stance against drugs, in 2015, Nugent declared his support for the legalization of marijuana for medical use.

Nugent refused to get the COVID-19 vaccine saying, "nobody knows what's in it", and had denied that the COVID-19 pandemic was real. On April 19, 2021, Nugent announced on Facebook that he had tested positive for COVID-19, which he referred to as the "Chinese shit". He said, "I thought I was dying ... I literally could hardly crawl out of bed the last few days." At a rally in Austin on April 29, 2023 (which focused on border security for Texas), a protester heckled at Nugent about the vaccine. Nugent responded by telling the person to "bring your needle up here, I'll shove it up your ass."

==== Obama administration ====
Nugent was particularly critical of former President Barack Obama and his Secretary of State Hillary Clinton, saying they "should be tried for treason & hung", among other comments directed towards them. On Facebook, he shared a video depiction of Clinton being shot by her 2016 Democratic presidential primary opponent, Bernie Sanders, commenting "I got your gun control right here bitch."

At a concert on August 22, 2007, while wielding what appeared to be assault-like rifles, Nugent said in reference of Obama, "suck on my machine gun". In the same gun-wielding rant, Nugent said of Dianne Feinstein, "ride one of these you worthless whore".

In 2012 he said of Obama, "He is an evil, dangerous man who hates America and hates freedom, and we need to fix this as soon as possible".

In January 2014, Nugent called Obama a "communist-educated, communist-nurtured subhuman mongrel". That February, Nugent endorsed Greg Abbott in the Republican primary election for Texas Governor. Abbott, however, distanced himself from Nugent due to the "subhuman mongrel" comment, saying, "This is not the kind of language I would use or endorse in any way." After being further chastised about it by Senator Rand Paul, Nugent apologized for the comment. However, when asked in April 2017 if he regretted his comments about Obama, he replied "No! I will never apologize for calling out evil people."

On April 17, 2012, while campaigning for Obama's opponent, Mitt Romney, at the 2012 NRA Convention, Nugent said, "If Barack Obama becomes the president in November, again, I will either be dead or in jail by this time next year." Nugent received a visit from the Secret Service for these remarks. Following these comments, commanders at Fort Knox opted not to allow him to perform at a previously scheduled event.

On February 12, 2013, Nugent attended the State of the Union address given by President Obama. He was the guest of U.S. Representative Steve Stockman of Texas's 36th congressional district.

==== Donald Trump ====
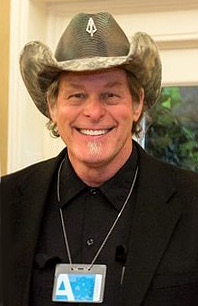
Nugent at the White House in April 2017

In February 2016, Ted Nugent praised Trump's 2016 Republican Presidential Primary opponent Ted Cruz, stating "My dream would be if Ted Cruz became president tonight. I really admire Ted Cruz, on many levels." Nugent later endorsed Donald Trump and during the last week of the U.S. presidential election campaign performed at a number of Trump rallies in Michigan, including Trump's final campaign rally in Grand Rapids.

On April 19, 2017, alongside Kid Rock and Sarah Palin, Nugent had a "long-planned" visit at the White House. According to Nugent, the visit lasted four hours and was like "a family reunion." Nugent described it as "a wonderful personal tour of every room" followed by photo sessions and dinner with Trump.

=== Potential runs for office ===
Referring to Michigan governor Jennifer Granholm (in office 2003–2011), during performances he would frequently interject "Jennifer Granholm, kiss my ass" into his songs and shoot an arrow at her likeness. In a 2007 interview, in discussing running for governor of Michigan, he stated that Granholm "is not doing an ugly job, but as the perfect woman, she is scrotumless".

Although Nugent has never run for government office, in the 2000s, he publicly speculated about doing so on several occasions. In May 2005, he announced he was "getting real close to deciding to run" for governor of Michigan in 2006; while in 2007, he talked about running for that office in 2010. During the latter period, he stated, "Michigan was once a great state. Michigan was a state that rewarded the entrepreneur and the most productive, work-ethic families of the state. Now the pimps and the whores and the welfare brats are basically the state's babies." Earlier, Nugent had been rumored to be under consideration by the Illinois Republican Party as its candidate in that state's 2004 Senate race, given his roots in Illinois.

In July 2008, Nugent declared "I was serious when I threatened to run for office in the past if I cannot find a candidate who respects the U.S. Constitution and our sacred Bill of Rights." When asked by Imagineer magazine in a 2010 interview about what he would do if elected to political office, he responded: "Slash the living hell out of the waste and corruption and the outrageous army of do-nothing bureaucrats. I would fire every government worker whose job I would deem to be redundant and wasteful. No able-bodied human being would ever get a handout again."

In a July 2013 interview with The Washington Post, Nugent expressed interest in possibly running for President of the United States as a Republican in the 2016 election. He never sought the office.

== Band members ==
Current members

- Ted Nugent – lead and rhythm guitar, lead and backing vocals, occasional bass (1975–present)
- Jason Hartless – drums, backing vocals (2016–present)
- Johnny Schoen – bass, backing vocals (2023–present)

Former members

- Rob Grange – bass, backing vocals (1975–1978, one off 2006)
- Derek St. Holmes – lead and backing vocals, rhythm guitar (1975–1976, 1976–1978, 1982, 1993–1995, 2011–2016, one off 2006)
- Cliff Davies – drums, backing and occasional lead vocals (1975–1982 one off 2006; died 2008)
- Meat Loaf – lead vocals (1976; died 2022)
- Charlie Huhn – lead vocals, rhythm guitar (1978–1982)
- Dave Kiswinery – bass, backing vocals (1979–1986, 1988)
- Carmine Appice – drums, backing vocals (1982–1983)
- Bobby Chouinard – drums (1983–1985; died 1997)
- Brian Howe – vocals (1984–1985; died 2020)
- Alan St. John – keyboards, backing vocals (1983–1985)
- Dave Amato – rhythm guitar, lead and backing vocals (1985–1988)
- Michael Mason – drums, backing vocals (1985–1987)
- Ricky Phillips – bass, backing vocals (1986–1987)
- Chuck Wright – bass (1987–1988)
- Pat Torpey – drums, backing vocals (1987–1988; died 2018)
- Mike Lutz – bass, keyboards, backing vocals (1993–1998, 2002)
- Denny Carmassi – drums (1993–1997)
- Marco Mendoza – bass, backing and occasional lead vocals (2000–2003)
- Tommy Aldridge – drums, backing vocals (1997–2001)
- Tommy Clufetos – drums, backing vocals (2002–2005, 2007)
- Barry Sparks – bass, backing and occasional lead vocals (2003–2007)
- Mick Brown – drums, backing vocals (2005–2014, 2015–2016)
- Jack Blades – bass, backing vocals (2007)
- Greg Smith – bass, backing and occasional lead vocals (2007–2022)
- Jonathan Kutz – drums (2014)
- Johnny Bee Badanjek – drums (2014)

== Discography ==
=== Solo ===
- Ted Nugent (1975)
- Free-for-All (1976)
- Cat Scratch Fever (1977)
- Double Live Gonzo! (Live) (1978)
- Weekend Warriors (1978)
- State of Shock (1979)
- Scream Dream (1980)
- Intensities in 10 Cities (Live) (1981)
- Great Gonzos! The Best of Ted Nugent (1981)
- Nugent (1982)
- Penetrator (1984)
- Little Miss Dangerous (1986)
- If You Can't Lick 'Em...Lick 'Em (1988)
- Spirit of the Wild (1995)
- Craveman (2002)
- Love Grenade (2007)
- Shutup & Jam! (2014)
- The Music Made Me Do It (2018)
- Detroit Muscle (2022)

=== The Amboy Dukes ===
- The Amboy Dukes (1967)
- Journey to the Center of the Mind (1968)
- Migration (1969)
- Marriage on the Rocks/Rock Bottom (1970)
- Survival of the Fittest Live (1971)
- Call of the Wild (1973)
- Tooth, Fang & Claw (1974)

=== Damn Yankees ===
- Damn Yankees (1990)
- Don't Tread (1992)

== Published books ==
- Nugent, Ted. Blood Trails: The Truth About Bowhunting Ted Nugent (1991) ISBN B0006ORP2G (146 pages)
- Nugent, Ted. God, Guns & Rock and Roll. Regnery Publishing, Inc. (August 21, 2000) ISBN 0-89526-173-1 (316 pages)
- Nugent, Ted. Blood Trails II: The Truth About Bowhunting. Woods N' Water Inc. (November 12, 2004) ISBN 0-9722804-7-2 (256 pages)
- Nugent, Ted and Nugent, Shemane. Kill It & Grill It: A Guide to Preparing and Cooking Wild Game and Fish. Regnery Publishing, Inc. (June 25, 2005) ISBN 0-89526-164-2 (250 pages)
- Nugent, Ted. Ted, White and Blue: The Nugent Manifesto. Regnery Publishing Inc. (November 12, 2008) ISBN 978-1-59698-555-1 (256 pages)
