= Here Comes the Judge =

Here Comes the Judge may refer to:

- Here Comes the Judge (Eddie Harris album), a 1964 jazz album by Eddie Harris
- Here Comes the Judge (Shorty Long album), a 1968 rhythm and blues album by Shorty Long
  - "Here Comes the Judge" (Shorty Long song), 1968
- "Here Comes the Judge" (Pigmeat Markham song), 1968
- Here Comes the Judge", a regular sketch on Rowan & Martin's Laugh-In
