= Shorty Long =

American R&B and soul singer-songwriter (1940–1969)

- Born: Frederick Earl Long; May 20, 1940; Birmingham, Alabama, U.S.
- Died: June 29, 1969 (aged 29) Detroit, Michigan, U.S.
- Genres: R&B, soul
- Instruments: Vocals, piano, organ, drums, harmonica, and trumpet
- Labels: Tri-Phi/Harvey, Soul/Motown

Frederick Earl "Shorty" Long (May 20, 1940 – June 29, 1969) was an American soul singer, songwriter, musician, and record producer for Motown's Soul Records imprint. He was inducted into the Alabama Jazz Hall of Fame in 1980.

== Career ==
Long was born in Birmingham, Alabama, and came to Motown in 1963 from the Tri-Phi/Harvey label, owned by Berry Gordy's sister, Gwen, and her husband, Harvey Fuqua. His first release, "Devil with the Blue Dress On" (1964), written with William "Mickey" Stevenson, was the first recording issued on Motown's Soul label, a subsidiary designed for more blues-based artists such as Long. While this song never charted nationally, the song was covered and made a hit in 1966 by Mitch Ryder and the Detroit Wheels. Long's 1966 single "Function at the Junction" was his first popular hit, reaching No. 42 on the US Billboard R&B chart. Other single releases included "It's a Crying Shame" (1964), "Chantilly Lace" (1967), and "Night Fo' Last" (1968).

Long's biggest hit was "Here Comes the Judge" which in July 1968 reached No. 4 on the R&B chart and No. 8 on the Billboard Hot 100. The song was inspired by a comic act on Rowan and Martin's Laugh-In about a judge by Pigmeat Markham, whose own "Here Comes the Judge" – a similar song with different lyrics – charted three weeks after Long's, also in July 1968, and reached No. 19 on Billboard. Long's 1969 singles included "I Had a Dream" and "A Whiter Shade of Pale". He released one album during his lifetime, Here Comes the Judge (1968).

Long played many instruments, including piano, organ, drums, harmonica, and trumpet. He acted as an MC for many of the Motortown Revue shows and tours, and co-wrote several of his tunes ("Devil with the Blue Dress On", "Function at the Junction", and "Here Comes the Judge"). Long was the only Motown artist besides Smokey Robinson who was allowed to produce his own recordings in the 1960s. Marvin Gaye, in David Ritz's biography Divided Soul: The Life & Times of Marvin Gaye, described Shorty Long as "this beautiful cat who had two hits, and then got ignored by Motown." Gaye claimed he "fought for guys like Shorty" while at Motown, since no one ever pushed for these artists. When Holland-Dozier-Holland came to Gaye with a tune, he stated, "Why are you going to produce me? Why don't you produce Shorty Long?"

== Death ==
On June 29, 1969, Long and a friend drowned when their boat crashed on the Detroit River in Michigan. Stevie Wonder played the harmonica at his burial, and placed it on his casket afterwards. Writer Roger Green's epitaph stated: "So there endeth the career of a man who sang what he wanted to sing – everything from the blues to romantic ballads, from wild and crazy numbers to a utopian vision of Heaven on Earth. Short in stature but big in talent, he entertained and amazed us, and finally he inspired us."

Motown released Long's final album, The Prime of Shorty Long, in November 1969, five months after his death.

== Discography ==
=== Albums ===
- 1968: Here Comes the Judge (LP, SM/SS-709)
- 1969: The Prime of Shorty Long (LP, SS-719)

=== Singles ===
- 1964: "Devil with the Blue Dress On"/"Wind It Up" (Soul 35001)
- 1964: "It's a Crying Shame"/"Out to Get You" (Soul 35005)
- 1966: "Function at the Junction"/"Call on Me" (Soul 35021)
- 1967: "Chantilly Lace"/"Your Love is Amazing" (Soul 350031)
- 1968: "Night Fo' Last" (Vocal) /"Night Fo' Last" (Instrumental) (Soul 35040)
- 1968: "Here Comes the Judge"/"Sing What You Wanna" (Soul 35044)
- 1969: "I Had a Dream"/"Ain't No Justice" (Soul 35054)
- 1969: "A Whiter Shade of Pale"/"When You Are Available" (Soul 35064)
