= Survival of the Fittest Live =

Live album by Ted Nugent and The Amboy Dukes
- Released: April 1971
- Recorded: July 31–August 1, 1970
- Venue: Eastown Theater in Detroit, Michigan
- Genre: Blues rock
- Length: 47:35
- Label: Polydor
- Producer: Ted Nugent and The Amboy Dukes

Ted Nugent and The Amboy Dukes chronology
Marriage on the Rocks/Rock Bottom (1970)	Survival of the Fittest Live (1971)	Call of the Wild (1973)

Survival of the Fittest Live is a live album by the Amboy Dukes. Released in 1971, it was the band's second album on Polydor Records, and the first where the band was credited as "Ted Nugent and the Amboy Dukes".

== Composition ==
The initial plan for the Survival of the Fittest album was to record one side of the album live and the other side in the studio, but this plan was later scrapped and the band instead recorded an entire live album. The album consists of five new songs written by Ted Nugent, and an extended live performance of "Prodigal Man", which previously appeared on the band's Migration album. In a review of the band's previous album, Marriage on the Rocks/Rock Bottom, AllMusic said that Survival of the Fittest sees the band embracing blues rock, which had only partially been explored on Marriage on the Rocks/Rock Bottom.

== Reception ==
Professional ratings
Review scores
Source	Rating
AllMusic	2/5 stars
Collector's Guide to Heavy Metal	6/10

AllMusic called the album "mildly interesting", lamenting that the hit "Journey to the Center of the Mind" was not included.

== Track listing ==
All tracks are written by Ted Nugent, unless noted.

Side A
No.	Title	Writer(s)	Length
1.	"Survival of the Fittest"	Ted Nugent; Rob Ruzga; Andy Solomon; K. J. Knight	6:17
2.	"Rattle My Snake"		3:00
3.	"Mr. Jones' Hanging Party"		4:55
4.	"Papa's Will"		9:00
Total length:			23:08

Side B
No.	Title	Length
5.	"Slidin' On"	3:03
6.	"Prodigal Man"	21:20
Total length:		24:24

== Personnel ==
- Ted Nugent – Guitar, vocals (lead on track 4)
- Andy Solomon – Keyboards, saxophone, vocals (lead on tracks 2, 5 and 6)
- Rob Ruzga – Bass
- K. J. Knight – Drums, vocals (lead on track 3)

Production

- Bryan Dombrowski – engineer, remixing at Electric Lady Studios, New York
- Joe Ford – assistant engineer
- Dave Palmer – remixing

== Charts ==
Chart (1971)	Peak position
US Billboard Top LPs	129
