= Detroit (band) =

American rock band

- Also known as: Detroit with Mitch Ryder
- Origin: United States
- Genres: Rock and roll, rhythm and blues, blue-eyed soul
- Years active: 1970–1974, 2005–?
- Labels: Paramount, Total Energy
- Spinoff of: The Detroit Wheels

Detroit (a.k.a. The Band Detroit, so as not to be confused with the city of Detroit) was a spinoff of rock group The Detroit Wheels.

== Background ==
This revised version of the Detroit Wheels was formed by Mitch Ryder as a successor to The Wheels in 1970. The only original Wheel in the group was the drummer Johnny "Bee" Badanjek; other members were guitarists Steve Hunter and Brett Tuggle, organist Harry Phillips and bassists W.R. Cooke and John Sauter.

A single album was released by Detroit, a 1971 self-titled LP issued on Paramount Records (US No. 176 in 1972). They had a hit with their version of the Lou Reed - penned song "Rock & Roll", which Reed liked enough to ask Steve Hunter to join his backing band. Ryder quit the group because of voice problems in 1972, and Detroit vocalist Rusty Day (formerly of the American Amboy Dukes and Cactus) took over his spot; without Ryder, the group floundered, and eventually broke up in 1974.

While not as commercially successful, Rusty Day's era of Detroit was a powerhouse to be reckoned with. He used to sing for Ted Nugent & The Amboy Dukes and was soon to form Cactus. Rusty, having been the original singer, picked prior to Mitch's return from Memphis and being asked to sing with them due to Rusty's having other commitments. Rusty's time at the helm waited. When he returned the band was Re-energized, and managed by John Sinclair, and Pete Andrews. The band toured all over spreading the gospel of Detroit Rock n Roll. Day, backed with soon to be legendary guitar hero, Steve Gaines (who would later form his own band, Crawdad, and would eventually join Lynyrd Skynyrd); took the band in a different, but in a still solid rocking direction This lineup also featured Bill Hodgson on guitar (formerly of Shadowfax, soon to reform the band), Ted "T-Mel" Smith (formerly of the Spinners), Nathaniel Peterson (later to become of Leon Mills's band Brat Axis), and Terry Emery (later to be a member of Crawdad and eventually .38 Special). Some recordings exist out there of this era.

== Career ==
Working with producer Bob Ezrin, Detroit recorded a version of the song "It Ain't Easy". Backed with "Long Neck Goose", it was released as a single in the United States on Paramount PAA-0094. It had a positive review in the 15 May 1971 issue of Record World with the reviewer asking the question is that Mitch Ryder singing on this strong debut? The reviewer said that the song was good and funky. It was also reviewed that week in the Choice Programming section of Cash Box. The reviewer noted the exciting instrumentation and vocal style which was called flashing. FM play and Top 40 sales potential were also noted.

It was reported in the 19 June issue of RPM Weekly that the group's production company Nimbus Nine was getting some heavy action internationally. One of the happening songs was the new single, "It Ain't Easy" by Mitch Ryder and Detroit.

It was also released in the UK on Paramount PARA 3022.

The group recorded the song "Rock 'N' Roll". It was backed with "Box of Old Roses" and released on Paramount 0133. For the week of 11 December 1971, the group's single "Rock 'n' Roll" was reviewed in the Cash Box Choice Programming section. The reviewer called the single potent stuff and said that it had Top 40 FM interest. Also, that week, their Detroit album debuted at no. 150 on the Cash Box Top Albums chart, 101 - 150 section.

The single, "Rock 'n' Roll" made its debut at no. 24 in the Cash Box Looking Ahead chart for the week of 18 December. By 25 December it was at no. 27. At the time, the songs were numbered from 1 - 30. For the week of 1 January 1972, the song was at no. 115 and the songs were listed from 101 - 120. The following week, with the songs listed from 101 - 126, "Rock 'n' Roll" was at no. 107. For the week of 15 January, the single reached no. 105 on the Looking Ahead chart. It then debuted at no. 97 on the Cash Box Top 100 for the week of 22 January. The single peaked at no. 95 for the week of 29 January.

The single also made it no. 107 on the Billboard chart.

== Later years ==
In 2005, Detroit re-emerged once again. original members W. Ron Cooke (Bass/Vocals) and Johnny 'Bee' Badanjek (Drums), got together to record a new album for Detroit Artist Workshop Group & Woodshed Productions. The duo brought in Steve Dansby (Guitar), a noted guitar sideman in the Motor City scene, having also played with Ron Cooke & Rusty Day in Day's 2nd incarnation of 'Cactus', as well as other side projects. As well as Micheal Katon, a noted Blues-Rock Pioneer, who had played with Dansby, Ron Cooke and Harry Philips in another band w Scott Morgan in the 1980s. This union began pounding out material in some of Detroit area's best Studios; Big Sky w Geoff Micheals, Rock City Studios w Pete Bankert (Destroy All Monsters), and Harmonie Park Studios w Brian & Mark Pastoria (Adrenalin/DC Drive).

In an effort to bridge the gap between the eras of Mitch Ryder & Rusty Day, as well as stay in tune with the later sounds of Detroit Rock & Roll; they enlisted the Vocals of Tom Ingham (Mugzy/Weapons/Plow/Romeo Rock & More). Tom's take on the Detroit sound filled out well with the rest of the band. The album, called Dead Man's Hand was released in 2006, and is still available. This independent release included special appearances by Scott Morgan, Johnny Spark, Johnny Arizona, J.B. Sweet and Chris Codish.

== Singles ==
USA Releases
Act	Release	Catalogue	Year	Notes
Detroit Featuring Mitch Ryder	"I Can't See Nobody" / "The Girl from the North Country"	Paramount PAA-0051	1970	
Detroit	"It Ain't Easy" / "Long Neck Goose"	Paramount PAA-0094	1971	
Detroit Featuring Mitch Ryder	"Rock 'n Roll" / "Box of Old Roses"	Paramount PAA-0133	1971	
Detroit Featuring Mitch Ryder	"Oo La La La Dee Da Doo" / "Gimme Shelter"	Paramount PAA-0158	1972	

== Albums ==
=== Detroit featuring Mitch Ryder (1971) ===
==== Chart performance ====
The album debuted on Billboard magazine's Top LP's chart in the issue dated January 29, 1972, peaking at No. 176 during a six-week run on the chart.

Track Listing

Side One

1. "Long Neck Goose" - (Bob Ezrin, Mitch Ryder)
2. "Is It You (Or Is It Me)" - (Johnny Badanjek, Mitch Ryder)
3. "It Ain't Easy" - (Ron Davies)
4. "Rock & Roll" - (Lou Reed)

Side Two

5. "Let It Rock" - (Chuck Berry)
6. "Drink" - (Jimmy Optner, Mark Manko)
7. "Box of Old Roses" - (W. R. Cooke)
8. "I Found a Love" - (Robert West, Willie Schofield, Wilson Pickett)

Personnel

- Mitch Ryder - lead vocals
- Steve Hunter - lead guitar
- Brett Tuggle - guitar
- Harry Phillips - keyboards
- W. R. Cooke - bass, backing vocals; lead vocals on "Box of Old Roses"
- Johnny "Bee" Badanjek - drums, backing vocals; co-lead vocals on "Is It You (Or Is It Me)"
- "Dirty Ed" Okalski - congas, tambourine

Additional Musicians

- Boot Hill - keyboards, harmonica
- John Sauter - bass
- Mark Manko - second guitar on "Long Neck Goose", "It Ain't Easy", "Let It Rock" and "I Found A Love"
