= Fresh cream =

Fresh Cream may refer to:

- Fresh Cream, the debut album by British blues-rock band Cream
- Crème fraîche, a dairy product of French origin
- Fresh cream, made from milk
