= Lober =

Lober may refer to:

- Lober (Mulde), a river of Saxony and Saxony-Anhalt, Germany, tributary of the Mulde

== People with the surname Lober ==
- Georg J. Lober (1891–1961), American sculptor
- John Lober (born 1968), mixed martial artist
- Rick Lober, keyboardist of the 1960s Detroit rock band The Amboy Dukes
