= The Rockets (Detroit band) =

American rock band based in Michigan

- Origin: Detroit, Michigan, United States
- Genres: Rock; blues rock
- Years active: 1972–1983; 2010–2011; 2013–2014; 2017
- Labels: Tortoise International/RCA; Capitol; RSO; Elektra; Guinness
- Spinoff of: The Detroit Wheels
- Past members: Johnny "Bee" Badanjek; Jim Edwards; Danny Taylor; Garret Bielaniec; Phil "Greasy" Carlisi; Mike Marshall; Jim McCarty; John Fraga; Marc Marcano; David Gilbert; Donnie Backus; Dennis Robbins; Dan Keylon; Bobby Haralson

The Rockets were an American rock band from Detroit, Michigan founded by guitarist Jimmy McCarty and drummer Johnny "Bee" Badanjek, both former members of the group the Detroit Wheels.

Along with slide and rhythm guitarist Dennis Robbins, bass guitarist John Fraga, and lead vocalist David Gilbert, The Rockets reached their pinnacle of success in 1979 with a Top 40 hit, a cover of the Fleetwood Mac song "Oh Well", produced by Allman Brothers producer Johnny Sandlin and an appearance on the TV series The Midnight Special.

== History ==
The Rockets were formed in 1972 by former Detroit Wheels members Johnny "Bee" Badanjek and Jim McCarty. Vocals and drums were handled by Badanjek, McCarty was on lead guitar, John Fraga was on bass guitar and Marc Marcano was on keyboards. Johnny Bee was the driving force and primary songwriter for the Rockets.

In the early days, the Rockets paid their dues playing gigs at venues such as the Rainbow Room in Detroit, the People's Ballroom in Ann Arbor, and the Rock 'N Roll Farm in Wayne, Michigan.

The band took on a new sound in 1976 when David Gilbert was brought in by new manager Gary Lazar, who also managed Detroit RCA Victor recording artist Dan Schafer, to take over vocals from Johnny Bee and Donnie Backus took over on keyboards. Gilbert appeared on all of the legitimate Rockets releases. John Badanjek sang lead on the Guinness bootleg release. Before joining the Rockets, Gilbert had fronted several bands and was one of several lead singers that passed through the ranks of Ted Nugent and the Amboy Dukes. In 1971, he toured with them for a year and a half before forming Shadow.

The Rockets made five studio albums (Note: A sixth unauthorized album, sourced from demo studio outtakes before the band had a recording contract, was released by Guinness Records in the same year as "Love Transfusion".) that produced several minor hits, including "Can't Sleep", which peaked at number 51 in 1979 and a rocking rendition of Fleetwood Mac's "Oh Well", which reached number 30 on the Billboard Hot 100 the week of September 1, 1979.

Although the band had its biggest following in Michigan, The Rockets received attention outside of the state, becoming known throughout the country. Their first album, Love Transfusion, was released in 1977. During this period, they also opened some shows for Kiss. The album failed to produce any hits.

The 1979 self-titled release featured the hits, "Oh Well" and "Turn Up the Radio". This record also featured David Hood on bass guitar from the famous Muscle Shoals Sound Studio in Alabama.

Their third album (with the addition of new bass guitarist Dan Keylon) was the 1980 release No Ballads. "Desire" was a popular tune from this album, peaking at number 70 on the Billboard Hot 100 the week of March 8, 1980. Next came the Back Talk album in 1981 (with another new bass guitarist, Bobby Haralson) and then Rocket Roll in 1982. "Rollin' by the Record Machine" from this release was the last hit for the band. Their final release, Live Rockets, was recorded on 4 nights – December 26 through 29, 1982, to a sold-out house each night at the Royal Oak Music Theatre near Detroit. This was the first time the band recorded with a saxophone player, and back-up vocalists, Shaun Murphy and Suzy Jennings, who continued to tour with them.

The Rockets performed their last two shows at Pine Knob near Detroit on August 28 and 29, 1983. The band members went their separate ways. Badanjek, McCarty and the rest went on to other projects. Gilbert played in several bands and learned the trade of Dryvit. He was 49 when he died of liver cancer in 2001. Dennis Robbins went on to become a solo artist signed to MCA Records in the mid-1980's, the lead singer for a band called Billy Hill in 1989, and a solo artist for Giant Records in the 1990s and a multi-platinum hit songwriter, co-writing numerous country songs such as "Two of a Kind (Working on a Full House)", "Get Me to the Church on Cumberland Road", "Do You Love Me (Just Say Yes)", "Too Much Month at the End of the Money", and more.

Bobby Neil Haralson died in the 1990s. John Fraga, bassist, born July 1, 1941, died September 27, 2010, at 69 and Donnie Backus died in the 2020s.

=== Reunion and assumed breakup ===
On April 16, 2010, The Rockets were honored at the Detroit Music Awards with the Distinguished Achievement Award. Two former members of the Rockets (Jim McCarty and Johnny "Bee" Badanjek) performed that night with their current band, The Hell Drivers. Shortly after that performance, and after receiving numerous requests from fans who attended The Hell Drivers local club shows for songs from The Rockets, the band decided that it was time revitalize the name, "Rockets".

On July 2, 2010, Rockets played their first official reunion show at the Stars and Stripes festival in Mt. Clemens, Michigan in front of 10,000 fans.

On August 21, 2010, Rockets played their second reunion show opening up for the J. Geils Band at the DTE Energy Music Theater. After opening for their old tour mates, comments made in several publications around town touted Rockets / J. Geils show as the "best of the summer".

On October 1, 2011, it was announced on Rockets' Facebook page that Jim McCarty had decided to quit the band (though no official reason was stated at the time as to why, it was revealed later on that he decided to rejoin the band Cactus full-time), thus ending the existence of the band and any possibility of Rockets recording and releasing any new material.

On April 14, 2013, the message "We're not done yet" was posted on their Facebook page. On May 29, 2013, it was announced on Facebook that Rockets (with only one original member, drummer Badanjek) were currently rehearsing heavily with new members for a bigger, badder, better sound and working up a whole bunch of new songs. Though no official line-up had been confirmed, it appeared as if the 2011 'break-up' had become a hiatus.

On November 23, 2013, the first studio release in 30 years, a four-song EP was made available on iTunes.

On June 28, 2014, Rockets played at the Trenton Street Fair in Trenton, MI.

In August 2014, Rockets played their last gig.

On September 17, 2015, it was stated on their official Facebook page in reply to the status of the band that there are no definitive plans to continue with the current line-up.

After a period of inactivity, it was announced that Rockets would be opening for Eddie Money on July 28, 2017. Throughout 2017, they continued to perform shows until the end of December.

== Discography ==
Studio albums

- Love Transfusion (1977)
- Rockets (1977; bootleg release)
- Rockets (Turn Up the Radio) (1979)
- No Ballads (Jan. 1980)
- Back Talk (1981)
- Rocket Roll (1982)

Live albums

- Live Rockets (1983)

EPs

- Greetings from Detroit (2013)
