= I Feel Free =

Single by British rock band Cream

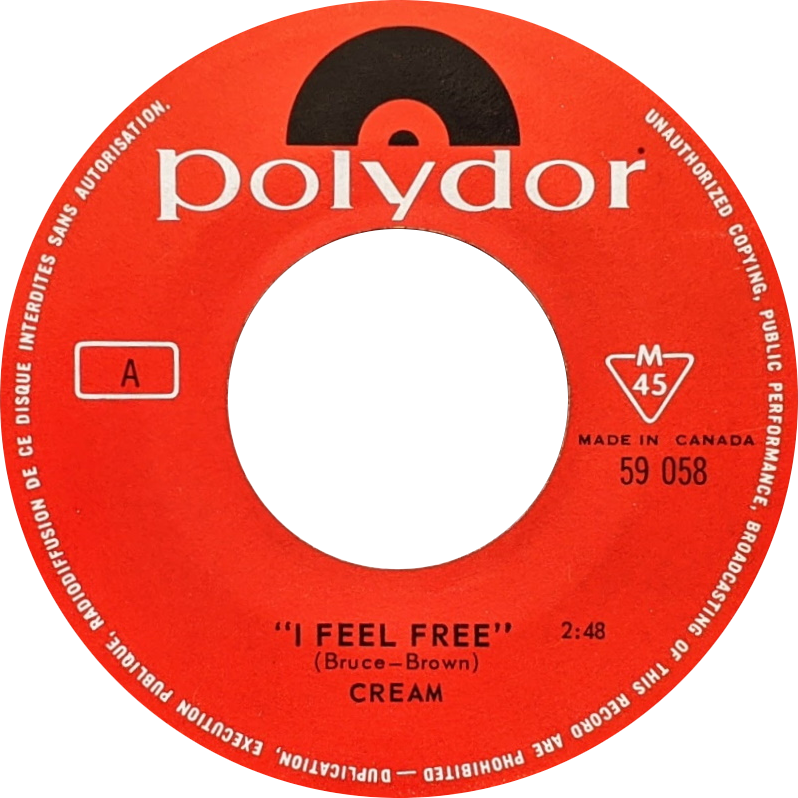
- Side A of Canadian single

Single by Cream
- B-side: "N.S.U."
- Released: December 1966
- Recorded: September 1966
- Studio: Ryemuse, London
- Genre: Blues rock, psychedelic pop
- Length: 2:48
- Label: Reaction (UK); Atco (US)
- Composer: Jack Bruce
- Lyricist: Pete Brown
- Producer: Robert Stigwood

Cream UK singles chronology
"Wrapping Paper" (1966)	"I Feel Free" (1966)	"Strange Brew" (1967)

Cream US singles chronology
"I Feel Free" (1967)	"Spoonful" (1967)

"I Feel Free" is a song first recorded by the British rock band Cream in December 1966. The lyrics were written by Pete Brown, with the music by Jack Bruce. The song showcases the band's musical diversity, effectively combining blues rock with psychedelic pop.

"I Feel Free" was released in the UK by Reaction Records as the group's second single and reached number 11 on the singles chart. In the US, Atco Records issued it as their debut single as well as the opening track on the group's first album, Fresh Cream (1966).

== Background ==
"I Feel Free" was recorded in September 1966 at Ryemuse Studios. The song was recorded on an Ampex reel-to-reel audio tape recorder by Robert Stigwood and John Timperley. Stigwood made the decision to omit the song on the British release of Fresh Cream, and instead released it as a single.

== Charts ==
"I Feel Free" first entered the UK Singles Chart on 17 December 1966 at number 50, hit its highest position on 28 January 1967 at number 11, and was last seen on 4 March 1967 at number 49; the song spent a total of 12 weeks on the charts. In the US the single reached number 116 on the Billboard Bubbling Under Hot 100 Singles chart in December 1967. In Finland it reached number 39.

== Personnel ==
- Ginger Baker – drums, percussion, backing vocals
- Jack Bruce – lead and backing vocals, bass guitar, piano
- Eric Clapton – guitar, backing vocals

== Cover versions ==
In 1967, The Amboy Dukes recorded their version of the song for their eponymous debut album.

In 1984, a version by Mark King of Level 42 was featured on his solo album Influences. This was released as a single and reached number 96 in the UK.

In 1986, a solo version by Jack Bruce was featured on a Renault 21 commercial and became his only solo UK hit, appearing for only one week at #95.

In 1987, American singer Belinda Carlisle recorded the song for her second studio album, Heaven on Earth (1987).

In 1993, a version by David Bowie appeared on the album Black Tie White Noise. Bowie cited a connection with his half-brother, who was the subject of a different song on the album, as his reason for including the cover on the album.
