= Made from Plate =

Made From Plate

Studio album by Onion
- Released: 1976
- Genre: Pop, country
- Label: Tiger Lily Records

Made From Plate is an album released by tax-scam label Tiger Lily Records as the debut album of a band called Onion. In reality, like Hotgun, released by Guinness Records the album was a composite, created from unpublished demo recordings made by several different unsigned performers. One of the rarer albums released by Tiger Lily Records, only two copies are known to exist.

== Album release ==
As the release of a tax scam label, the album came with minimal documentation beyond songwriting credits and claims that the songs had been published by a company owned by Charles Koppelman and Martin Bandier. However, this may be a false claim, in the same way that the documentation on Hotgun claimed that the original songs on that album had been published by R. Stevie Moore's father.

Record collector Scott Blackerby discovered the album in 2011 and diagnosed it as a composite created from unpublished demo tracks, based on the multiplicity of songwriters, the fact that some of the tracks sounded unfinished, and the differing musical styles involved. This was confirmed in 2013, when Dan Chapman, friend of one of the credited writers, Dennis Wilkerson contacted Blackerby. He revealed that at some point around 1970 he and Wilkerson after having some success with a high school rock band, had been contacted by a producer named John McCauley who offered to professionally produce their music. In the end the project did not result in a recording contract and the pair went their separate ways. Many years later Wilkerson had been contacted by a record collector in Europe who had obtained a copy of Made From Plate and was trying to track down the songwriters.

It is likely, as with the tracks that made up Hotgun, that the recording studios who supplied the tracks for Made From Plate sold them to Tiger Lily Records as a means of recouping the recording costs.

== Track listing ==
=== Side one ===
1. "Colorado" (Note: Songwriting credited to C. Waylon.)
2. "Black Cloud"
3. "Children Hold On" (Note: Songwriting credited to Jim Bucke.)
4. "My, My, My, My" (Note: Songwriting credited to Dennis Wilkerson. Actually a joint effort between Dan Chapman and Dennis Wilkerson.)

=== Side two ===
1. "Believe Me"
2. "When Something's Wrong"
3. "A Lovely Day" (Note: Songwriting credited to Steve Wilson)
4. "Thanks To All of You"

== See also ==
- Hotgun – An album released by Guinness Records as a band's debut album which was in reality a compilation album.
