= Ted Nugent (album) =

Studio album by Ted Nugent
- Released: September 1975
- Recorded: 1975
- Studio: The Sound Pit, Atlanta
- Genre: Hard rock
- Length: 38:52
- Label: Epic
- Producer: Tom Werman; Lew Futterman

Ted Nugent chronology
Tooth Fang & Claw (1974)	Ted Nugent (1975)	Free-for-All (1976)

Singles from Ted Nugent
- 1. "Where Have You Been All My Life" Released: November 1975; 2. "Hey Baby" / "Stormtroopin'" Released: March 1976

Ted Nugent is the debut studio album by American rock musician Ted Nugent. The album was released in September 1975 by Epic Records. It was Nugent's first release after the disbanding of his former group, The Amboy Dukes.

== Background ==
Tired of The Amboy Dukes' lack of effort and discipline, Nugent decided he had enough and left the group. He took a three-month vacation (his first ever) clearing his head in the Colorado wilderness, spending his time deer hunting and enjoying the outdoors. Renewed, Nugent returned to civilization in search of a new direction and a new band. Joining him in the Ted Nugent Band were former Amboy Duke Rob Grange on bass, along with Cliff Davies (ex-If) on drums and finally, from a local Michigan band called Scott which had opened for the Dukes previously, a singer/guitarist named Derek St. Holmes.

The new group hit the road and then the studio, forming the songs which would send their first album into the Billboard Top 30 and into the multi-platinum range. The first track, "Stranglehold", would set the stage for Nugent's career: an eight-minute plus guitar attack with vocals by St. Holmes and Nugent, a long solo played on Nugent's Gibson Byrdland guitar recorded in one take and a unique phase bass guitar effect by Grange. St. Holmes' sang tracks such as "Queen of the Forest", "Hey Baby", "Just What the Doctor Ordered" and "Snakeskin Cowboys", the latter featuring an 8-string Hagström bass played by Grange, which would prove to be staples of the band's concert tours for years to come. "Motor City Madhouse" is an ode to Ted's hometown of Detroit.

The album was produced by Tom Werman and former If manager Lew Futterman. Nugent said about the album, "If anyone wanted to know what rock 'n roll was all about, that's the only album they'd need".

"One had to recognize that there was a definite synergy between the band and Nugent", said producer Tom Werman.

== Reception ==
Professional ratings
Review scores
Source	Rating
AllMusic	4/5 stars
Classic Rock	5/5 stars
Collector's Guide to Heavy Metal	8/10

In 2005, Ted Nugent was ranked number 487 in Rock Hard magazine's book The 500 Greatest Rock & Metal Albums of All Time.

"Stranglehold" was ranked the 31st greatest guitar solo of all time by Guitar World.

== Track listing ==
All songs are credited as "written and arranged by Ted Nugent", except "Hey Baby", which is credited as "written and arranged by Derek St. Holmes". In Martin Popoff's book Epic Ted Nugent, Nugent admits that "Stranglehold" was co-written by Rob Grange, who never received a royalty share. Derek St. Holmes claims the album was co-written by the whole band, and that Nugent took sole credit as a way to not pay them royalties.

All lead vocals by Derek St. Holmes, except where indicated.

Side one
No.	Title	Lead vocals	Length
1.	"Stranglehold"	Derek St. Holmes and Ted Nugent (interlude only)	8:22
2.	"Stormtroopin'"		3:07
3.	"Hey Baby"		4:00
4.	"Just What the Doctor Ordered"		3:43

Side two
No.	Title	Lead vocals	Length
5.	"Snakeskin Cowboys"		4:38
6.	"Motor City Madhouse"	Ted Nugent	4:30
7.	"Where Have You Been All My Life"		4:04
8.	"You Make Me Feel Right at Home"	Cliff Davies	2:54
9.	"Queen of the Forest"		3:34

CD edition bonus tracks
No.	Title	Length
10.	"Stormtroopin' (Live)"	6:36
11.	"Just What The Doctor Ordered (Live)"	4:52
12.	"Motor City Madhouse (Live)"	8:38
13.	"Magic Party (Outtake)"	2:56

== Personnel ==
Band members

- Derek St. Holmes – lead vocals on all tracks except where noted, rhythm guitar, arrangements
- Ted Nugent – lead and rhythm guitar, backing vocals, percussion, arrangements, lead vocals on "Motor City Madhouse," spoken word on "Stranglehold"
- Rob Grange – bass, eight-string bass on "Snakeskin Cowboys", bass phase effect on "Stranglehold", arrangements
- Cliff Davies – drums, vibraphone, backing vocals, arrangements, lead vocals on "Stormtroopin" and "You Make Me Feel Right at Home"

Additional musicians

- Steve McRay – keyboard
- Brian Staffeld – percussion
- Tom Werman – percussion, producer

Production

- Lew Futterman – producer
- Anthony Reale – engineer, mixing
- Howard Fritzson – art direction
- Al Clayton – photography
- Gerard Huerta – lettering
- Bruce Dickinson – producer (1999 reissue)
- Vic Anesini – remastering
- Stephan Moore – 1999 reissue project director
- Gary Graff – 1999 reissue liner notes

== Charts ==
=== Weekly charts ===
Chart (1975–1976)	Peak position
Australia Albums (Kent Music Report)	37
UK Albums (OCC)	56
US Billboard 200	28

=== Year-end charts ===
Chart (1976)	Position
US Billboard 200	28

== Certifications ==
Region	Certification	Certified units/sales
Canada (Music Canada)	Gold	50,000^{^}
United States (RIAA)	2× Platinum	2,000,000^{^}
^{^} Shipments figures based on certification alone.
