= Call of the Wild (Ted Nugent and the Amboy Dukes album) =

Studio album by Ted Nugent and the Amboy Dukes
- Released: September 1973
- Recorded: June–July, 1973
- Studio: Sleepy Hollow Studios (Ithaca, New York)
- Genre: Hard rock; blues rock
- Length: 38:01
- Label: DiscReet
- Producer: Lew Futterman

Ted Nugent and the Amboy Dukes chronology
Survival of the Fittest Live (1971)	Call of the Wild (1973)	Tooth, Fang & Claw (1974)

Singles from Call of the Wild
- 1. "Sweet Revenge" Released: 1974

Call of the Wild is the fifth studio album by the Amboy Dukes, credited as Ted Nugent & the Amboy Dukes, released in 1973.

== Composition ==
The compositions of the Call of the Wild album may have been influenced by AM and FM radio hits of the period in which the album was recorded. To the listener, the album's title track, which opens the album, is "not as blistering as ["Cat Scratch Fever"], but more metallic than the psychedelia/blues of the original Amboy Dukes", calling the song "more Jeff Beck gone rock than the quasi-Ozzie persona Nugent gleefully would embrace" in his subsequent albums under his own name, comparing the composition to the music of Spirit and Jo Jo Gunne. "Sweet Revenge" may have lifted its melody from the Grass Roots' song "Things I Should Have Said". A website called the song "Pony Express" "a strange amalgam of '60s out-of-the-garage/heading-toward-stadiums riff rock", saying that it borrowed its melody from Deep Purple's "Highway Star", and said that "Ain't It the Truth" was a piano boogie, comparing it to "Jumpin' Jack Flash". The album's second side is sequenced to sound like a single continuous jam session. "Rot Gut" may sound like "Joe Perry emulating Jeff Beck". "Below the Belt" contains keyboard and flute instrumentation played by Gabe Magno.

== Reception ==
Professional ratings
Review scores
Source	Rating
AllMusic	3/5 stars
Collector's Guide to Heavy Metal	6/10

Metal Hammer included the album cover on their list of "50 most hilariously ugly rock and metal album covers ever".

== Track listing ==
All tracks are written by Ted Nugent, except where indicated.

Side A
No.	Title	Writer(s)	Length
1.	"Call of the Wild"		4:51
2.	"Sweet Revenge"		4:06
3.	"Pony Express"		5:21
4.	"Ain't It the Truth"	Rob Grange; Nugent	4:57
Total length:			19:05

Side B
No.	Title	Writer(s)	Length
5.	"Renegade"	Grange	3:25
6.	"Rot Gut"	Grange; Nugent; Gabriel Magno; Vic Mastrianni	2:45
7.	"Below the Belt"		7:03
8.	"Cannon Balls"		5:43
Total length:			18:59

== Personnel ==
- Andy Jezowski - vocals
- Ted Nugent - guitars, vocals, percussion, arrangements
- Gabriel Magno - keyboards, flute
- Rob Grange - bass, vocals, arrangements
- Vic Mastrianni - drums, vocals

Production

- Lew Futterman - producer
- John Childs - engineer
