= Hotgun =

Studio album by Hotgun
- Released: 1977
- Genres: Rock, pop
- Label: Guinness

Hotgun is an album purported to be the self-titled debut record of a band called Hotgun, released by tax-scam label Guinness Records. The album is actually a composite, combining demo recordings made by members of a Nashville area band called Ethos (R. Stevie Moore, Victor Lovera, Roger Ferguson and Billy Anderson), with cover versions of popular songs recorded by employees of Nashville recording studio, Audio Media, originally intended for compilation albums.

== Album release ==
As the release of a tax scam label, the album came with minimal documentation. While all of the cover versions were credited to the correct songwriters, the original songs were all credited to Victor Lovera, a friend and collaborator of R. Stevie Moore's and fellow member of the band Ethos when in actuality only the two solo acoustic songs ("Joe Pepitone" (Note: The full title of the song is "And Pray Not to Get Joe Pepitone".) and "My Father's Son") were written by Lovera himself, with the other original songs being collaborations between Lovera and Moore.

Bart Bealmear, with the aid of R. Stevie Moore and former Audio Media owner Paul Whitehead, was able to determine just how the three Ethos songs ("Show Business", "Nashville Bats" (Note: The full title of the song is "Home of the Nashville Bats".) and "Love Graph"), all recorded at the Audio Media studio in 1973, found their way onto the album. It appears that the studio held onto copies of the recordings, which were in a style that was different from that dominating Nashville at the time and sold them to Guinness Records along with several cover versions of top 40 hits recorded by Audio Media employees for discount compilation albums, to recoup the recording costs. The two Lovera solo acoustic songs were recorded around two years prior to the Ethos songs at Tree Publishing, another Nashville area recording studio and were most likely provided to Guinness Records under similar circumstances to the other songs on the album.

== Production notes ==
According to the liner notes, the album was released on Guinness Records and distributed by Dellwood Records. Its Guinness Catalogue Number is GNS 36014.

== Track listing ==
=== Side one ===
1. "Joe Pepitone" (Note: Songwriting credited to "Victor". Actually by Victor Lovera.)
2. "Show Business" (Note: Songwriting credited to "Victor". Actually a joint effort between R. Stevie Moore and Victor Lovera.)
3. "Whatever Gets You thru the Night" (Note: Songwriting credited to John Lennon.)
4. "Nashville Bats"
5. "My Father's Son"

=== Side two ===
1. "Love Graph"
2. "Silly Love Songs" (Note: Songwriting credited to Paul McCartney.)
3. "Afternoon Delight" (Note: Songwriting credited to William T. Danoff.)
4. "Fallin' in Love" (Note: Songwriting credited to Paul Richard Furay.)
5. "Straight Shootin' Woman" (Note: Songwriting credited to Gerald Michael Edmonton.)

== See also ==
- Made from Plate – an album released by Tiger Lily Records as a band's debut album which was in reality a compilation album.
