= Here Comes the Judge (Shorty Long song) =

Single by Shorty Long

from the album Here Comes the Judge
- B-side: "Sing What You Wanna"
- Released: 1968 (U.S.)
- Genre: Comedy, Soul, Funk
- Length: 2:33
- Label: Tamla Motown; Soul 35044
- Songwriters: Billie Jean Brown, Suzanne de Passe, Shorty Long
- Producer: Shorty Long

Shorty Long singles chronology
"Chantilly Lace" (1967)	"Here Comes the Judge" (1968)	"Ain't No Justice" (1969)

"Here Comes the Judge" is a 1968 song written by Shorty Long, Billie Jean Brown and Suzanne de Passe, and performed by Long. The song was Long's biggest hit, reaching No. 4 on the U.S. R&B chart and No. 8 on the Billboard Hot 100. It held the No. 10 spot on Cashbox for two weeks. The song stayed on the Hot 100 for 11 weeks and Cashbox for 9 weeks. The song also entered the UK chart in July 1968, and was a Top 30 hit, peaking at #30.

"Here Comes the Judge" was inspired by a comic act on Rowan & Martin's Laugh-In about a judge by Pigmeat Markham, whose own "Here Comes the Judge" - a completely different song - charted two weeks after Long's did in June 1968, and became a Top 20 hit.

== Charts ==
Chart (1968)	Peak position
New Zealand (Listener)	11
US Billboard Hot 100	8
US Cashbox	10
