= Influences =

Studio album by Mark King
- Released: July 1984
- Recorded: Chipping Norton (Oxfordshire)
- Genre: Progressive rock; jazz fusion; jazz funk; dance rock
- Label: Polydor
- Producer: Jerry Boys; Mark King

Mark King chronology
Influences (1984)	One Man (1998)

Influences is the debut solo studio album by English musician Mark King, singer and bassist with Level 42. It was released by Polydor Records in July 1984.=

The album features a cover of the song "I Feel Free" by Cream, which was released as a single. King played most of the instruments on the album. Guest musicians include Level 42 keyboardist Mike Lindup and Drummie Zeb from Aswad, the latter of whom played drums on "Clocks Go Forward".

The album charted at number 77 in the UK.

== Track listing ==
1. "The Essential" (Mark King) – 18:32
2. "Clocks Go Forward" (Mark King, R. Gould) – 5:20
3. "I Feel Free" (Jack Bruce, Pete Brown) – 4:37
4. "Pictures on the Wall" (Mark King, R. Gould) – 4:51
5. "There Is a Dog" (Mark King) – 6:26

== Personnel ==
- Mark King – vocals, basses, guitar, keyboards, percussion and drums
- Mike Lindup – Fender Rhodes, Yamaha DX7 and backing vocals
- Gary Barnacle – electric sax, saxophone and flute
- Steve Sidwell – trumpet
- Adrian Lee – Wave PPG synthesiser
- Drummie – drums on "Clocks Go Forward"
- Bruce Dukov – violins
- Francis Mitchell – cello
- Mike Vernon, Jeremy Green and Linda Richardson – the choir on "The Essential"
