= The Amboy Dukes (album) =

Studio album by The Amboy Dukes
- Released: November 1967
- Genre: Psychedelic rock, garage rock
- Length: 37:39
- Label: Mainstream
- Producer: Bob Shad

The Amboy Dukes chronology
The Amboy Dukes (1967)	Journey to the Center of the Mind (1968)

Singles from The Amboy Dukes
- 1. "Baby, Please Don't Go" Released: 1967

The Amboy Dukes is the debut studio album by American rock band The Amboy Dukes. It was released in November 1967 on Mainstream Records.

== Composition ==
The album is noted for containing an energetic recording of Joe Williams' blues standard "Baby, Please Don't Go", as well as covers of Pete Townshend's composition "It's Not True", and Cream's "I Feel Free". AllMusic said that the album fused "the psychedelia of the early Blues Magoos with Hendrix riffs and British pop" and described the song "Colors" as psychedelic hard rock. The publication compared "Down on Philips Escalator" to Syd Barrett-period Pink Floyd, and said that "The Lovely Lady" "almost sounds like the Velvet Underground meets the Small Faces by way of Peanut Butter Conspiracy."

== Chart performance ==
The album had modest success, it peaked at No. 183 on the Billboard Top LPs in early 1968, during a four-week stay on the chart.

== Reception ==
Professional ratings
Review scores
Source	Rating
AllMusic	4.5/5 stars
Collector's Guide to Heavy Metal	5/10

"Baby, Please Don't Go" was released as a single, with the song "Psalms of Aftermath" as the B-side. Ultimate Classic Rock said that the album received "little, if any, fanfare outside of [the band's] home base of Detroit". AllMusic wrote in a retrospective review that the album is "as essential to the Amboy Dukes' catalog as the non-hit material on Psychedelic Lollipop was to the Blues Magoos, the first album from the Amboy Dukes is a real find and fun listening experience. [...] This is a far cry from Cat Scratch Fever, and that's why fans of psychedelia and '60s music should cherish this early diamond."

== Track listing ==
Side A
No.	Title	Writer(s)	Length
1.	"Baby, Please Don't Go"	Big Joe Williams	5:35
2.	"I Feel Free"	Jack Bruce; Pete Brown	3:42
3.	"Young Love"	Ted Nugent; Steve Farmer	2:45
4.	"Psalms of Aftermath"	Nugent; Farmer	3:19
5.	"Colors"	Nugent; Farmer; Rick Lober; Bill White	3:20
Total length:			19:47

Side B
No.	Title	Writer(s)	Length
6.	"Let's Go Get Stoned"	Valerie Simpson; Nick Ashford; Jo Armstead	4:24
7.	"Down on Philips Escalator"	Nugent; Farmer	3:00
8.	"The Lovely Lady"	Farmer	2:58
9.	"Night Time"	Nugent; Farmer	3:11
10.	"It's Not True"	Pete Townshend	2:42
11.	"Gimme Love"	Nugent; Farmer	2:43
Total length:			20:05

== Personnel ==
The Amboy Dukes

- John (J.B.) Drake – vocals
- Ted Nugent – guitar
- Steve Farmer – guitar
- Rick Lober – piano, organ
- Dave Palmer – drums
- Bill White – bass

Technical

- Bob Shad – producer
- John Cue – engineer
- Maxine Epstein – album coordinator
- Jack Lonshein – cover design

== Charts ==
Chart (1968)	Peak position
US Billboard Top LPs	183
