= Tiger Lily Records =

American record label and alleged tax scam

- Parent company: Roulette Records
- Founded: Late 1960s
- Founder: Morris Levy
- Country of origin: USA
- Location: 40 West 57th Street, New York, NY 10019

The United States version of Tiger Lily Records was a record label that was run by Roulette Records founder Morris Levy. Purportedly it was a tax scam created by Levy and was never intended to make a profit. Tiger Lily's primary modus operandi was to acquire demo tapes from artists or studios and then release them without the artists consent and sometimes without even the artist's knowledge. Other albums released by Tiger Lily have been identified as bootlegs of albums released in the early 1970s by Artie Ripp's Family Productions and two cases of performers who were actually signed to Tiger Lily Records have been identified.

The most prominent artists known to have a record released by Tiger Lily were Richard Pryor, whose album L.A. Jail was released by Tiger Lily, and Rod Stewart, who had a live recording of him in performance at the 1973 Reading Festival released by Tiger Lily in 1976 under the title Reading Festival Featuring Rod Stewart. The album credited to Stewart was really a collection of various artists from the Reading Festival, with Rod Stewart and the Faces only appearing on one track. The most expensive and best known Tiger Lily Records release is the album "Stonewall" credited to a band of the same name. It has sold for as much as $14,100.

Along with Guinness Records, Tiger Lily was one of the major tax scam labels of the 1970s with around 70 albums being released. The types of albums released by Tiger Lily fell into several broad categories:

- Single band/artist albums based on unpublished material. (e.g., "Glenn Faria", "Stonewall")
- Compilation albums based on unpublished material disguised as the debut album of a single band. (e.g., "Made From Plate")
- Bootleg re-issues of albums previously published on obscure labels. (e.g., "Sleepy Hollow")
- Bootleg albums based on live recordings. (e.g., "L.A Jail", "Reading Festival Featuring Rod Stewart")
- Material recorded by bands/artists signed to Tiger Lily Records. (e.g., "Airborne", "Pressed For Time")

Record collector and music producer Stephan Colloredo-Mansfeld is said to own the largest collection of Tiger Lily releases in the world.

== List of Records ==
	Artist	Title	Year	Cover
1	Airborne	Airborne	1976	
2	Brother Bait	Brother Bait	1976	
3	Brubeck, Darius & Friends	Darius Brubeck & Friends	1976	
4	Cahoon Lindsay Band, James	Kinky Mersey	1976	
5	Calliope	Calliope	1976	
6	Carr, Frankie	Frankie Carr	1975	
7	Clarke, Linda	Yes, Indeed!	1976	
8	Claude & Sherry	Claude & Sherry	1976	
9	Corbitt & Daniels	Live I	1976	
10	Corbitt & Daniels	Live II	1976	
11	Drake Band, Steve	Nature Intended	1976	
12	Fields & Shipley	Fields & Shipley	1976	
13	Gordon, Jon	Jon Gordon	1976	
14	Gray, Dobie	Gray, Dobie	1979	
15	Heavy Cruiser	Heavy Cruiser	1976	
16	Holbrook Experience, John	Miserable You	1976	
17	Howard, James Newton	James Newton Howard	1974	
18	Jade, Roland	12 For The Road	1976	
19	James, Jay	Good Times & Bad Times	1976	
20	King, Clydie	Rushing To Meet You	1976	
21	Lewis, David	Just Mollie and Me..	1976	
22	Mead, David	I'm On Stage	1976	
23	Oliver Walrus	Me, Myself And I	1976Rose, Tim	
24	Pryor, Richard	L.A. Jail	1976	
25	Rose, Tim	Unfinished Song	1976	
26	Sherman, Steve	It Is What It Is...	1976	
27	Starr, Charlie	Charlie Starr	1976	
28	Stewart, Rod & Friends	Reading Festival	1976	
29	Titus, Libby	Titus, Libby	1977	
30	Woodstock Revival	Cruisin' In Time	1976	
31	Onion	Made from Plate	1976	
32	Sounds of the City Experience	Sounds of the City Experience	1976	
33	Too Smooth	Too Smooth	1976	
34	Turner, Velvert	Velvert Turner	1976	
35	Grasso, Richie	Season of Grace	1976	
