= Here Comes the Judge (Shorty Long album) =

Studio album by Shorty Long
- Released: 1968
- Genre: Rhythm and blues
- Length: 31:43
- Language: English
- Label: Soul

Shorty Long chronology
Here Comes the Judge (1968)	The Prime of Shorty Long (1969)

Here Comes the Judge is the 1968 debut studio album by American rhythm and blues singer Shorty Long, released on Motown subsidiaries Soul Records and Tamla Motown. After recording several singles for Motown, Long had an unexpected hit with the title track to this release and the label rushed out a full album, compiling several songs already released as singles as well as new recordings. That year, Long toured with a stable of Motown acts including The Contours, The Marvelettes, and The Spinners to promote the album, which was the only one released in Long's lifetime.

== Reception ==
After the mid-year success of "Here Comes the Judge", editors at Billboard recommended this release to retailers as a "new action LP". Editors at AllMusic Guide scored this album four out of five stars with critic Andrew Hamilton praising several tracks, but opining "as good as this is, it would have been better if they had included his two Tri-Phi sides and his two earlier soul/Motown recordings".

== Track listing ==
1. "Here Comes the Judge" (Billie Jean Brown, Shorty Long, and Suzanne de Passe) – 2:37
2. "Night fo' Last" (Instrumental) (Clarence Paul) – 2:34
3. "Function at the Junction" (Eddie Holland and Long) – 2:56
4. "Don't Mess with My Weekend" (Long and Sylvia Moy) – 2:27
5. "Ain't No Justice" (Brown, Long, de Passe, and Frank Wilson) – 2:58
6. "Devil with the Blue Dress" (Long and William "Mickey" Stevenson) – 2:59
7. "Night fo' Last" (Vocal) (Paul) – 2:34
8. "Stranded in the Jungle" (James Johnson and Ernestine Smith) – 2:57
9. "Here Comes Fat Albert" (Long, Moy, and Edwin Starr) – 2:48
10. "Sing What You Wanna" (Ron Dunbar and Long) – 2:21
11. "Another Hurt Like This" (Long) – 2:58
12. "People Sure Act Funny" (Titus Turner) – 2:06

== Personnel ==
- Shorty Long – vocals
- Sammy Davis Jr. - intro on "Here Comes the Judge"
- The Originals - background vocals
- The Andantes - background vocals
- The Elgins - background vocals (track 11)
- The Funk Brothers – instrumentation
- Reggie Goodwin – liner notes
- Randy Kling – mastering

== See also ==
- List of 1968 albums
