= The Prime of Shorty Long =

Studio album by Shorty Long
- Released: November 1969
- Genre: Rhythm and blues
- Length: 33:11
- Language: English
- Label: Soul
- Producer: Shorty Long

Shorty Long chronology
Here Comes the Judge (1968)	The Prime of Shorty Long (1969)

The Prime of Shorty Long is a 1969 studio album by American rhythm and blues singer Shorty Long, released on Motown subsidiaries Soul Records and Tamla Motown shortly after his death. The release was compiled of songs that Long had intended for his follow-up album and was credited to him as producer.

== Reception ==
Editors at AllMusic Guide scored this album 4.5 five stars with critic Andrew Hamilton alleging that "bad choices for single releases killed any chance this LP had" in spite of the quality of Long's singing. In his 2012 book on Procol Harum, Henry Scott-Irvine highlights Long's cover of "A Whiter Shade of Pale" as a stand-out soul rendition of the tune.

== Track listing ==
1. "I Had a Dream" (Shorty Long and Sylvia Moy) – 3:21
2. "A Whiter Shade of Pale" (Gary Brooker and Keith Reed) – 2:52
3. "Memories Are Made of This" (Richard Dehr, Terry Gilkyson, and Frank Miller) – 2:57
4. "I'm Walkin'" (Dave Bartholomew and Fats Domino) – 2:18
5. "I Cross My Heart" (Ivory Joe Hunter) – 3:20
6. "Lillie of the Valley" (Long and Moy) – 2:47
7. "Blue Monday" (Bartholomew and Domino) – 2:35
8. "Baby Come Home to Me" (Clarence Paul, Luvel Broadnax, and Roosevelt Smith) – 2:24
9. "I Wish You Were Here" (Long and William "Mickey" Stevenson) – 2:38
10. "When You Are Available" (Anna Gordy Gaye, Elgie Stover, Long, and Marvin Gaye) – 2:32
11. "Give Me Some Air" (Long) – 2:42
12. "Deacon Work" (Lawrence Brown, George Gordy, and Allen Story) – 2:45

== Personnel ==
- Shorty Long – vocals, production
- The Originals - background vocals
- The Andantes - background vocals
- The Elgins - background vocals (track 10)
- J. Dempknock – photography
- Ragni L. Griffin – liner notes
- Curtis McNair – design
- Paul Riser – arrangement on all tracks except "Baby Come Home to Me"
- Robert White – arrangement on "Baby Come Home to Me"

== See also ==
- List of 1969 albums
