= Rick Lober =

American rock keyboardist

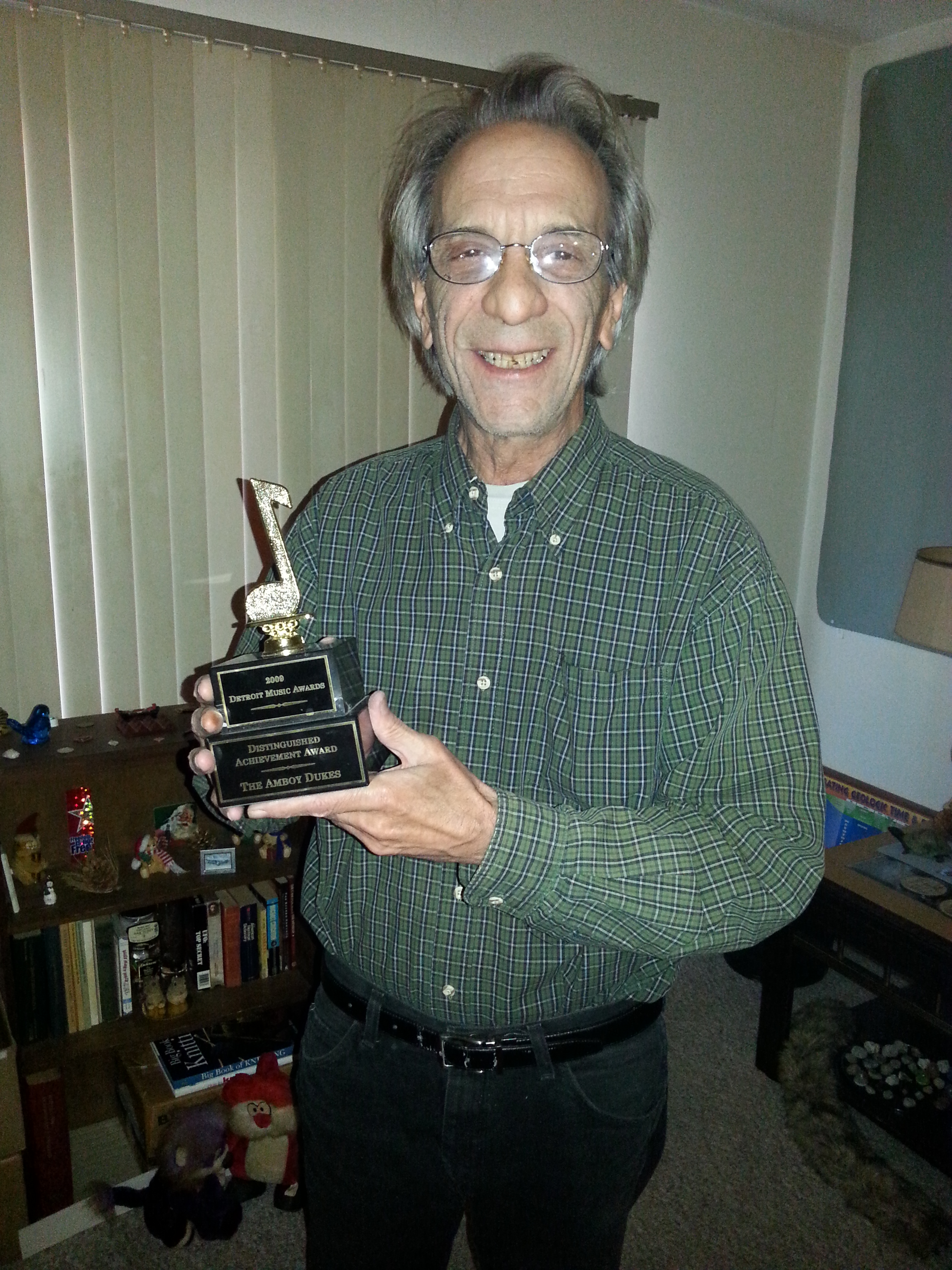
- Lober with the Detroit Music Award in 2013

Background information
- Born: 1941 (age 83–84)
- Origin: Detroit, Michigan, U.S
- Genres: Psychedelic rock; acid rock; hard rock
- Instrument: Keyboards
- Labels: Mainstream; Saint Thomas
- Formerly of: The Amboy Dukes

Rick Lober (born 1941) is an American musician who was the original keyboardist for the psychedelic rock band the Amboy Dukes in the 1960s. The group is known for its only hit "Journey to the Center of the Mind". His bandmates were Ted Nugent, Steve Farmer, John Drake, Dave Palmer and Bill White.

== Career ==
=== The Amboy Dukes ===
The Amboy Dukes were local favorites in the metro Detroit area long before Nugent established himself as the 'Motor City Madman'. Their first single that achieved national success outside of the Detroit area was "Baby, Please Don't Go" a cover of a Big Joe Williams song. It was often played live and on the local Detroit television show "Robin Seymour's Swingin Time". The song highlighted the early style of Nugent's guitar virtuosity and was also known for the wild and exciting keyboard antics of Lober. It featured one of the most stellar keyboard solos of the psychedelic rock era. Lober helped to create the group's first album The Amboy Dukes which charted.

=== Post-Dukes ===
Since his time with the Amboy Dukes, Lober has performed continuously throughout the Detroit area with local favorites such as Benny and the Jets. His songwriting and studio work resurfaced in 2000 on Farmer's Journey to the Darkside of the Mind, an album on Saint Thomas Records. Four of the album tracks are credited to Lober on this release. It was recorded at Victor Peraino's studio of Arthur Brown fame.

Lober has performed with Detroit guitarist Jeffrey "the Woodsman" Faust, through Saint Thomas Records.

At the 18th annual Detroit Music Awards on April 17, 2009, the original lineup of the Amboy Dukes performed on stage for the first time in thirty years. On stage at The Fillmore Detroit were Nugent on lead guitar, Farmer on guitar, Drake on vocals, Lober on keyboards, Andy Solomon on keyboards and White on bass. In recognition of the band's contribution to rock music history, they received a Distinguished Achievement award.
