= Marriage on the Rocks/Rock Bottom =

Studio album by The Amboy Dukes
- Released: March 1970
- Recorded: December 1969
- Studios: Mirasound Studios & The Hit Factory, New York
- Genres: Blues rock; hard rock; psychedelic rock
- Length: 45:26
- Label: Polydor
- Producers: Edwin H. Kramer; Amboy Dukes

The Amboy Dukes chronology
Migration (1969)	Marriage on the Rocks/Rock Bottom (1970)	Survival of the Fittest Live (1971)

Marriage on the Rocks/Rock Bottom is the fourth album by American rock band The Amboy Dukes, released in 1970, this was a more experimental album than their previous releases. It is the first of two albums released on the Polydor Records label.

== Production ==
During the recording of the Amboy Dukes' albums for Polydor Records, the band experienced creative differences in regards to their musical direction, and drummer Dave Palmer left the group to become a recording engineer. The album was recorded by a four-member lineup consisting of Ted Nugent, Dave Palmer, Andy Solomon, and Greg Arama.

== Reception ==
Professional ratings
Review scores
Source	Rating
AllMusic	3/5 stars
Collector's Guide to Heavy Metal	3/10

AllMusic wrote, "Amboy Dukes' Marriage on the Rocks/Rock Bottom is a very musical record, more experimental than their releases on Mainstream Records". The website compared the band's recordings on Polydor to the band Ten Years After and said that "Marriage/Part 1: Man/Part 2: Woman/Part 3: Music" sounded like the band Jethro Tull, calling it a progressive blues song. The album's songs are longer and more reliant on improvisation, with AllMusic noting that "Breast Fed Gator (Bait)" is one of the only songs that could have been released as a single, due to its shorter length compared to the rest of the album. AllMusic called "Children of the Woods" "workable British pop". AllMusic compared "The Inexhaustible Quest for Cosmic Cabbage", which quotes Béla Bartók's "String quartet no. 2", to the Beach Boys, Spirit and Ten Wheel Drive, and said that it sounded like the Amboy Dukes hoped "to be the Mothers of Invention".

== Track listing ==
All tracks composed by Ted Nugent, except where indicated.

Side A
No.	Title	Length
1.	"Marriage (Part 1: Man. Part 2: Woman. Part 3: Music)"	9:02
2.	"Breast-Fed 'Gator (Bait)"	2:52
3.	"Get Yer Guns"	4:23
4.	"Non-Conformist Wilderbeastman"	1:25
5.	"Today's Lesson (Ladies & Gentlemen)"	5:30
Total length:		24:04

Side B
No.	Title	Writer(s)	Length
6.	"Children of the Woods"		8:27
7.	"Brain Games of Yesteryear"		3:42
8.	"The Inexhaustible Quest for the Cosmic Cabbage" (Includes excerpts from Bartók's "String quartet no. 2")	Andy Solomon; Robert C. Solomon	10:05
Total length:			23:12

== Personnel ==
- Ted Nugent – guitar, lead vocals on track 4
- Andy Solomon – keyboards, lead vocals, saxophone
- Greg Arama – bass
- Dave Palmer – drums, assistant engineer

Production

- Edwin H. Kramer – producer, engineer

== Charts ==
Chart (1970)	Peak position
US Billboard Top LPs	191
