= Fresh Cream =

Studio album by Cream
- Released: 9 December 1966
- Recorded: August–November 1966
- Studios: Rayrik & Ryemuse (London)
- Genres: Blues rock; psychedelic rock
- Length: 37:48 (LP version), 40:39 (CD version)
- Label: Reaction
- Producer: Robert Stigwood

Cream chronology
Fresh Cream (1966)	Disraeli Gears (1967)

Singles from Fresh Cream
- 1. "Spoonful" Released: September 1967

Fresh Cream is the debut studio album by the British rock band Cream, consisting of bassist Jack Bruce, guitarist Eric Clapton and drummer Ginger Baker. A mix of blues covers and originals, the album was a pivotal release in the history of blues rock, inspiring many further bands in the genre, as well as being instrumental in the development of jam rock and, later, heavy metal music. In 2012, Rolling Stone ranked it at number 102 in their list of the 500 Greatest Albums of All Time.

== Songs and recording ==
Almost as soon as Cream were formed in July 1966, they entered Rayrik Studios at Chalk Farm, London, to begin work on their debut single and album with Robert Stigwood producing and John Timperley as engineer. Clapton later noted that the budget was minuscule, working with four-track machines and basically running each song a few times through until they got a satisfactory take, with minimal overdubbing afterward. The first sessions at Rayrik on 3 August produced the outtakes "The Coffee Song", "You Make Me Feel" and "Beauty Queen", followed later in the month by the group's debut single "Wrapping Paper", a music hall influenced piece designed to showcase the group's stylistic versatility, but which was received with puzzlement upon its October release by fans expecting a blues-oriented sound.

After the band moved to Ryemuse Studios (now known as Mayfair), the bulk of the album was recorded between September and November, neatly divided between old blues covers ("Spoonful", "Cat's Squirrel", "Rollin' And Tumblin'", "I'm So Glad", "Four Until Late") and original material penned by bassist Jack Bruce, with two contributions by Ginger Baker ("Sweet Wine" and his groundbreaking extended drum solo "Toad") and two by Bruce's first wife Janet Godfrey, who co-wrote "Sleepy Time Time" with Jack and "Sweet Wine" with Ginger. A session in September also produced the single "I Feel Free" (included on the US version of the album), the first product of the songwriting team of Jack Bruce and bohemian poet Pete Brown which proved a more typical representation of their sound than "Wrapping Paper"; released on the same day as the album, it climbed to No. 11 in the UK charts.

Bruce later said that the opening song "N.S.U." was written for the band's first rehearsal. "It was like an early punk song... the title meant "non-specific urethritis. It didn't mean an NSU Quickly – which was one of those little 1960s mopeds. I used to say it was about a member of the band who had this venereal disease. I can't tell you which one... except he played guitar." The mellow pop of "Dreaming" showcased Bruce's ghostly falsetto vocal style, which was also used on "I Feel Free" and would become more prominent on later releases. Clapton's lengthy, swirling solos on "Sweet Wine" and "Spoonful" pointed toward psychedelia and heavy metal, with Clapton employing much echo, fuzz and feedback, which had been directly inspired by his first meeting with Jimi Hendrix on 1 October. Overall, the group's fusion of blues with hard rock and improvisational jazz on this record proved seminal on the development of rock music from that point forward.

== Release ==
Fresh Cream was released in the UK on 9 December 1966, as the first LP on the Reaction Records label, owned by producer Robert Stigwood. It was released in both mono and stereo versions, at the same time as the release of the single "I Feel Free". Interest in the supergroup's first album was intense, and it peaked at No. 6 on the UK Albums Chart. Over two years later, around the time of the band's final album Goodbye in February 1969, the album saw another surge in the charts that placed it as high as No. 7. The album was released in a slightly different form in January 1967 by Atco Records in the US, also in mono and stereo versions, where it peaked at No. 39.

The mono versions went out of print not long after release, and for many years only the stereo recordings were available. The UK mono album was reissued on CD for the first time in Japan, by Universal Music, in late 2013 as part of a deluxe SHM-CD and SHM-SACD sets (both editions also contain the UK stereo counterpart).

In January 2017, the album was again reissued, by Polydor, in a 4-CD box-set containing mono and stereo versions of the original UK and US release along with singles and B-sides. In April 2017, Polydor followed up with a corresponding 6-LP box set.

== Reception and legacy ==
Professional ratings
Review scores
Source	Rating
AllMusic	4/5 stars
Robert Christgau	A−
Daily Express	(Positive)
The Great Rock Discography	6/10
MusicHound Rock	4/5 stars
The 1000 Best Pop-Rock Albums	4.5/5 stars
Uncut	5/5 stars
The Virgin Encyclopedia of Heavy Rock	4/5 stars

Upon release, critical reaction in the UK was largely positive. While Melody Maker opened its review opining "not quite as fresh as it could have been", they said "it's still a great record. Clapton, Baker and Bruce, working like trojans to construct exciting, free, wild music of life, love and soul", concluding sensational things to come from the group. Record Mirror noted "their style on this LP is a very mellow and relaxed sort of music, which oozes confidence ... sort of progressive British Rhythm and Blues". Disc & Music Echo claimed "it's good, although not as good, one feels, as it might have been, not enough Eric Clapton for one thing" before picking "Dreaming" as the best track.

One person not happy with the album was Clapton himself, who felt its sound was already outdated. In an interview not long after the album's release, he stated "it could have been better. We were working on it so long ago, and we have greatly improved since then. I'm also not completely happy with the production".

Retrospectively, Uncut describes the songs as "all about playing in a band and relaxing, the joy of being young, and they walk it like they talk it, being jumping-off points for wonderful spur-of-the moment improvisations". Writing for the BBC, Sid Smith notes that "blues, pop and rock magically starts to coalesce to create something brand new". Michael Galluci of Ultimate Classic Rock concluded the album "helped spur a bigger, louder and heavier way of playing rock 'n' roll...the amount of power the band manages to generate on this album is remarkable. It's safe to assume groups like Led Zeppelin and The Who would never have traveled in a similar direction without Cream leading the way." Similarly, Stephen Thomas Erlewine of AllMusic opined that the album was "instrumental in the birth of heavy metal and jam rock".

In 2012, the album was ranked number 102 on Rolling Stone's list of the 500 Greatest Albums of All Time (the highest-ranking album by Cream on the list), calling it "tight and concise, a blueprint for the band's onstage jams". In 2019, Classic Rock ranked it fourth in their list of the best British blues rock albums ever, writing that while the "feverishly anticipated" album struggled to live up to expectations, "it is still one of the most important albums in 60s blues rock, and its influence on what came afterwards is immense." They added that Cream and Fresh Cream were "the sparks that ignited the blues rock explosion, and without them who knows how many of rock's family jewels would not exist today." Colin Larkin opined in The Virgin Encyclopedia of Heavy Rock (1999) that Fresh Cream "confirmed the promise" of "I Feel Free", adding that Cream "were not what they seemed, another colourful pop group singing songs of tangerine bicycles. With a mixture of blues standards and exciting originals, the album became a record that every credible music fan should own." The Rough Guide to Rock (1999) contributor Brian Hinton called it "powerful and simple music, with half the songs drawn from Delta and Chicago blues."

== Track listing ==
All lead vocals by Jack Bruce, except where noted.

=== Original UK release ===
Side one
No.	Title	Writer(s)	Length
1.	"N.S.U."	Jack Bruce	2:43
2.	"Sleepy Time Time"	Bruce, Janet Godfrey	4:20
3.	"Dreaming"	Bruce	1:58
4.	"Sweet Wine"	Ginger Baker, Godfrey	3:17
5.	"Spoonful"	Willie Dixon	6:30
Total length:			18:48

Side two
No.	Title	Writer(s)	Lead vocals	Length
1.	"Cat's Squirrel"	Doctor Ross, arr. Bruce, Baker, Eric Clapton	Instrumental	3:04
2.	"Four Until Late"	Robert Johnson, arr. Clapton	Clapton	2:07
3.	"Rollin' and Tumblin'"	Hambone Willie Newbern		4:42
4.	"I'm So Glad"	Skip James		3:58
5.	"Toad"	Baker	Instrumental	5:09
Total length:				19:00

=== Original U.S. version ===
Side one
No.	Title	Writer(s)	Length
1.	"I Feel Free"	Bruce, Pete Brown	2:52
2.	"N.S.U."	Bruce	2:43
3.	"Sleepy Time Time"	Bruce, Janet Godfrey	4:20
4.	"Dreaming"	Bruce	1:58
5.	"Sweet Wine"	Baker, Godfrey	3:17
Total length:			15:10

Side two
No.	Title	Writer(s)	Lead vocals	Length
1.	"Cat's Squirrel"	Ross, arr. Bruce, Baker, Clapton	Instrumental	3:03
2.	"Four Until Late"	Johnson, arr. Clapton	Clapton	2:07
3.	"Rollin' and Tumblin'"	Newbern		4:42
4.	"I'm So Glad"	James		3:57
5.	"Toad"	Baker	Instrumental	5:09
Total length:				18:58

=== Later U.S. release ===
Original reissues in the U.S. on RSO/Polydor use the same track listing as the original UK edition given above in which "I Feel Free" is replaced with "Spoonful" on Side 1. Polydor's original CD release from the 1980s combines the UK and US track lists, but also includes "The Coffee Song" and "Wrapping Paper", which were removed from subsequent CD releases starting in the 1990s.

=== Scandinavian release ===
An edition released originally only in Scandinavia was a 12-track release. It had the same ten tracks as the UK version, plus added two tracks: "Wrapping Paper", written by Jack Bruce and Pete Brown, and "The Coffee Song", written by Tony Colton and Ray Smith. Both vinyl and cover were made in Germany and exported to the Swedish market only – the German original had the same 10 tracks as the UK release. The group didn't want "Coffee Song" to be issued at all, but a mono version was mixed and coupled with "Wrapping Paper" as a single. There were no plans at this stage to release it in stereo, so for the Swedish issue a crude stereo mix was used. This was made during the sessions in early August 1966 for instructive purpose – the whole track as basic mono is mixed far right and a solo guitar overdub far left. Never intended for release, this mix was soon lost, and for later stereo issues a new one was made.

The front cover and record no. (623 031) are the same as the German issue, but three different back covers exist. The first listed the correct 12 tracks, the second listed 10 tracks, and a third had the 12-track listing glued over the 10-track listing.

Side one
No.	Title	Writer(s)	Length
1.	"N.S.U."	Jack Bruce	2:43
2.	"Sleepy Time Time"	Bruce; Janet Godfrey	4:20
3.	"Dreaming"	Bruce	1:58
4.	"Sweet Wine"	Ginger Baker; Godfrey	3:17
5.	"Spoonful"	Willie Dixon	6:30
6.	"Wrapping Paper"	Bruce, Brown	2:24
Total length:			21:12

Side two
No.	Title	Writer(s)	Lead vocals	Length
1.	"Cat's Squirrel"	Doctor Ross, arr. Bruce, Baker, Clapton	Instrumental	3:03
2.	"Four Until Late"	Robert Johnson, arr. Clapton	Clapton	2:07
3.	"The Coffee Song"	Ray Smith, Tony Colton		2:45
4.	"Rollin' and Tumblin'"	Hambone Willie Newbern		4:42
5.	"I'm So Glad"	Skip James		3:57
6.	"Toad"	Baker	Instrumental	5:09
Total length:				21:43

This version of Fresh Cream was also released by Polydor (2384 067) in the UK in 1974 under the title Cream.

This version of Fresh Cream was released by RSO (2658 142) & Polydor (2658 142) in Germany during 1981 as a boxset under the title Cream.

== Personnel ==
Cream

- Ginger Baker – drums, percussion, vocals
- Jack Bruce – vocals, bass guitar, harmonica, piano
- Eric Clapton – guitar, vocals

Technical

- Robert Stigwood – producer
- John Timperley – engineer

== Charts ==
Chart (1966–1967)	Peak position
Australian Albums (Kent Music Report)	10
Finnish Albums (Soumen Virallinen)	4
French Albums (SNEP)	20
UK Albums (Official Charts)	6
US Billboard 200	39

Chart (2025)	Peak position
Greek Albums (IFPI)	62

== Certifications ==
Region	Certification	Certified units/sales
Australia (ARIA)	Gold	35,000^{^}
United Kingdom (BPI)	Gold	100,000^{^}
United States (RIAA)	Gold	500,000^{^}
^{^} Shipments figures based on certification alone.
