= Tooth, Fang & Claw =

Studio album by Ted Nugent and The Amboy Dukes
- Released: August 1974
- Recorded: June 1974
- Studio: The Sound Pit (Atlanta, Georgia)
- Genre: Hard rock
- Length: 40:10
- Label: DiscReet
- Producer: Lew Futterman; Ted Nugent; Jon Child

The Amboy Dukes chronology
| Call of the Wild (1973) | Tooth, Fang & Claw (1974) |

Ted Nugent chronology
| Call of the Wild (1973) | Tooth Fang & Claw (1974) | Ted Nugent (1975) |

Tooth, Fang & Claw is the sixth and final studio album by the Amboy Dukes, credited as "Ted Nugent's Amboy Dukes", as well as the band's second release on DiscReet Records. Following this album's release, Ted Nugent moved forward to national and worldwide success.

== Composition ==
Tooth, Fang & Claw demonstrates "Nugent's further emerging hard rock sound", as well as an intentional shifting away from the blues sound that the Amboy Dukes had displayed on their Polydor recordings and the psychedelia of the band's Mainstream albums; the band does not experiment with their sound on Tooth, Fang & Claw as they had on their previous albums.

== Reception ==
Professional ratings
Review scores
| Source | Rating |
|---|---|
| AllMusic | 2/5 stars |
| Collector's Guide to Heavy Metal | 6/10 |

In January 1975 the magazine Creem wrote of the album, "hotshot guitarist exhibits his pizzazz, bites some nails, eats glass, rumbles in the dirt, growls a lot, and makes a total idiot of himself. Get the Amboy Dukes collection on Mainstream and forget about this clown."

== Track listing ==
All tracks are written by Ted Nugent, and arranged with Rob Grange, except where indicated.

Side A
| No. | Title | Length |
|---|---|---|
| 1. | "Lady Luck" | 5:57 |
| 2. | "Living in the Woods" | 3:54 |
| 3. | "Hibernation" | 9:19 |
| Total length: | | 19:19 |

Side B
| No. | Title | Writer(s) | Length |
|---|---|---|---|
| 4. | "Free Flight" | | 4:03 |
| 5. | "Maybellene" | Chuck Berry; Russ Fratto; Alan Freed | 3:28 |
| 6. | "The Great White Buffalo" | | 4:57 |
| 7. | "Sasha" | | 3:06 |
| 8. | "No Holds Barred" | | 4:48 |
| Total length: | | | 20:51 |

== Personnel ==
- Ted Nugent – guitar, vocals, percussion, producer
- Rob Grange – bass, vocals, arrangements, composer
- Vic Mastrianni – drums, percussion

Additional musicians

- Andy Jezowski (and the Crusted Warblers) – backing vocals

Production

- Lew Futterman – producer
- Jon Childs – producer, engineer
