= Steve Farmer (musician) =

American guitarist, composer, and lyricist (1948–2020)

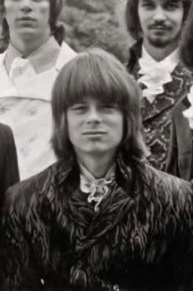
- Farmer in 1968.

Background information
- Born: Steven Orville Farmer; December 31, 1948; Detroit, Michigan, U.S.
- Died: April 7, 2020 (aged 71) Redford, Michigan, U.S.
- Genres: Psychedelic rock; acid rock; hard rock
- Occupations: Singer, songwriter, lyricist, musician, teacher
- Instruments: Guitar, vocals
- Years active: 1967–2020
- Labels: Mainstream; Saint Thomas
- Formerly of: The Amboy Dukes

Steven Orville Farmer (December 31, 1948 – April 7, 2020) was an American guitarist, composer, and lyricist, best known for his composition with Ted Nugent in 1968, "Journey to the Center of the Mind," performed by their group The Amboy Dukes. Farmer wrote the lyrics to the hit song, which peaked at #16 on the charts. He also co-wrote with Nugent, or self-composed, 22 compositions on the first three albums by The Amboy Dukes.

== Amboy Dukes ==
The Dukes' first offering was their self-titled album , The Amboy Dukes , which charted. It featured their first charting single, "Baby, Please Don't Go", an intense cover of a Big Joe Williams song. The second album was Journey to the Center of the Mind, a psychedelic rock opera that was their highest-charting album and produced their most commercially successful single. The third album was Migration. Although not a commercial success, it showed a refinement of both Farmer's songwriting skills and Nugent's songwriting and guitar skills. All three albums (released by Mainstream Records) featured Farmer touches in words and music that emphasized psychedelic imagery, so central to late sixties pop culture.

== 2000 album ==
In 2000, Farmer completed work on his new millennium "journey". The album is titled Journey to the Darkside of the Mind and was released by Saint Thomas Records. Fellow Amboy Dukes member Rick Lober contributed to the album. It was produced by Victor Peraino, who is known for his innovative work on the Mellotron with England's Arthur Brown.

Track	Title	Time
1	"Journey to the Darkside of the Mind"	3:05
2	"Shadows on the Wall"	4:10
3	"The Stone"	3:05
4	"Hiroshima"	6:50
5	"Detroit After Dark"	3:00
6	"Journey Sojourn Soul"	4:30
7	"Ivory Castles"	4:00
8	"Death Is Life"	2:00
9	"Saint Phillips Friend"	3:49
10	"Perfect Day"	6:40
11	"Sir Thomas Sonnet"	1:38
12	"Magically Hip – Hip Death Goddess"	5:00

== Dukes award and reunion ==
At the 18th annual Detroit Music Awards on April 17, 2009, the original lineup of The Amboy Dukes performed on stage for the first time in thirty years. On stage at The Fillmore Detroit were Nugent on lead guitar, Farmer on guitar, John Drake on vocals, Andy Solomon on keyboards, Lober on keyboards and Bill White on bass. In recognition of the band's contribution to rock music history, they received a Distinguished Achievement award.

== Death ==
Farmer died at his home in 2020, aged 71.
