= The Detroit Wheels =

Mitch Ryder's backup band

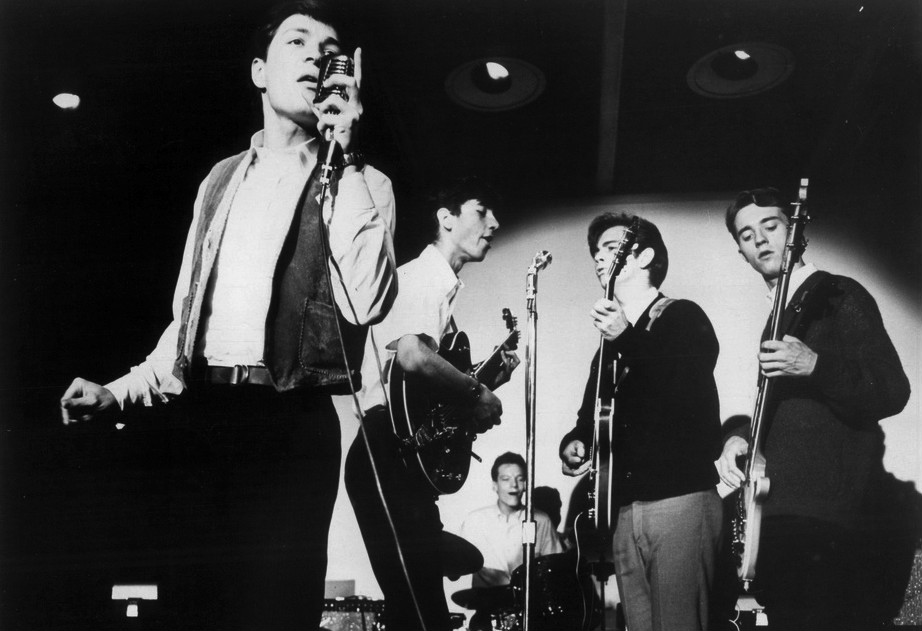
- Mitch Ryder and the Detroit Wheels in 1966.

Background information
- Also known as: Mitch Ryder and The Detroit Wheels; Billy Lee and the Rivieras
- Origin: Detroit, Michigan, U.S.
- Genres: Rock and roll; rhythm and blues; blue-eyed soul; garage rock
- Years active: 1964–1967
- Labels: NewVoice; Stateside; Connoisseur; Sundazed; Rhino
- Spinoffs: Detroit
- Past members: See members section.

The Detroit Wheels were an American rock band, formed in Detroit in 1964. They served as Mitch Ryder's backup band from 1964 to 1967.

The band had a number of top twenty hits in the mid-1960s before lead singer Ryder was enticed away by Bob Crewe with offers of a solo career, after which the group quickly dissolved. Two of its former members, Jim McCarty and Johnny "Bee" Badanjek, later reunited to establish the nucleus of a new band called The Rockets, after McCarty found some fame with the hard rock outfit Cactus. After Ryder's solo effort failed, he formed a "spin-off" called The Band Detroit, which had one album with a cult following.

== History ==
The band had its origins in Detroit in the early 1960s. At this time, a young white singer by the name of William Levise, Jr., who was singing at a black soul club called The Village, met a rock & roll group which included McCarty, bassist Earl Elliot, and Badanjek. Levise decided to join the group and took the stage name of Billy Lee, and the band became Billy Lee and the Rivieras. After attracting attention from producer Bob Crewe while working as a support act to The Dave Clark Five, the group moved to New York to start recording. However, since another band had already recorded as The Rivieras, the band decided to change its name again. With the help of a phone book, Levise took the new stage name of Mitch Ryder, and Mitch Ryder & The Detroit Wheels were born. The group's live performances are said to have had an "explosive quality" and their style has been described as "revved up...R&B".

Mitch Ryder & The Detroit Wheels had their first big hit in 1965 with "Jenny Take a Ride" (which was actually a medley of Chuck Willis' "C.C. Rider" & Little Richard's "Jenny, Jenny"), which reached No. 10 on the Billboard Hot 100, and No. 1 on the R&B chart – the first time a self-contained rock group had achieved the latter distinction. It sold over one million copies, and was awarded a gold disc by the RIAA. Crewe had originally planned to release the track as a B-side, but changed his mind after seeing the reactions of Brian Jones and Keith Richards, of The Rolling Stones, who were in the Stei-Philips studio in New York City as it was being recorded.

Ryder and the Detroit Wheels followed up with another top twenty hit, "Little Latin Lupe Lu," which peaked at No. 17. After a couple of misses, the group had its biggest hit with another medley, Shorty Long's "Devil with a Blue Dress On" and "Good Golly Miss Molly" (again by Little Richard), which reached No. 4. A session player named Barry Goldberg was hired in New York to play keyboards on this recording. (Goldberg went to perform with Mike Bloomfield, Steve Stills and many others during his long career.) Around this period they also recorded a number of albums, largely composed of reworked R&B classics, along with a smattering of original compositions.

In 1967, Ryder had another top ten hit with "Sock It to Me, Baby!" which was banned by some stations as too sexually suggestive. The band had its last hit with the brassy "Too Many Fish in the Sea"/"Three Little Fishes" single, which reached No. 24. Crewe then persuaded Ryder to quit the group and embark on a solo career.

After Ryder's departure, Badanjek fronted a short-lived band of the same name which recorded several tracks, most notably "Linda Sue Dixon", a song glorifying the illicit hallucinogenic drug LSD, which charted worldwide in 1968. They also recorded "Think (About the Good Things)/For the Love of a Stranger". The band's line-up during this time is uncertain.

Ryder's solo career, meantime, had been mishandled and failed to take off. In 1969 he, Badanjek and some other musicians along with Ryder on vocals covering a number of the songs established a new band called The Band Detroit, which recorded an eponymous named album. One single was released from the album, a cover of Lou Reed's "Rock & Roll" that Reed reportedly liked better than his original version, and Reed subsequently hired Detroit guitarist Steve Hunter for his own band. Detroit's follow-up tour to the album, however, met with little success, after which Ryder departed once again and the band broke up. The final lineup of the band featured harmonica player and powerhouse singer Rusty Day, who Ryder chose to replace him in 1972, and also featured pre-Lynyrd Skynyrd guitarist Steve "Crawdaddy" Gaines, guitarist Bill Hodgson of Shadowfax, drummer Ted "T-Mel" Smith of The Spinners, bassist Nathaniel Peterson of Twin Dragons, and keyboardist Terry Emery of the Moxie Band Atlanta. Steve Gaines died on Skynyrd's plane crash October 20, 1977. Also killed in the crash were Gaines's older sister Cassie, and Skynyrd founder and lead singer Ronnie VanZant. Rusty Day was murdered on June 3, 1982, at his home in Longwood, Florida. Nobody knows who killed Day, and the case remains open. Bill Hodgson died around 1983 shortly after having moved to New York. Hodgson died due to what was confirmed to be a drug overdose, most likely accidental. Ted "T-Mel" Smith died of natural causes in 2006. Terry Emery joined the Moxie Band Atlanta in 1997, which he's remained in ever since. Nathaniel Peterson has been in several bands after The Band Detroit broke up, in particularly one that Peterson founded called Twin Dragons. He later joined Savoy Brown and died in 2023

In 1972, Badanjek and former Wheels guitarist McCarty reunited to form the nucleus of a new group called The Rockets, which recorded a number of albums through the 1970s and 1980s. McCarty continues to perform today with his group, Mystery Train. John Badanjek remains active as well and still plays out with McCarty. McCarty also played with Rusty Day, Tim Bogert and Carmine Appice in the group Cactus.

== Discography ==
=== Mitch Ryder & The Detroit Wheels ===
Take a Ride... (1966)
1. Shake A Tail Feather
2. Come See About Me
3. Let Your Lovelight Shine
4. Just A Little Bit
5. I Hope
6. Jenny Take A Ride (#15 CAN)
7. Please, Please, Please
8. I'll Go Crazy
9. I Got You
10. Sticks And Stones
11. Bring It On Home To Me
12. Baby Jane (Mo-Mo Jane)
13. Joy

- Re-released on the Sundazed Music label, ASIN B000003GX4.

Breakout...!!! (1966)
1. Walking The Dog
2. I Had It Made
3. In The Midnight Hour
4. Ooh Poo Pah Doo (Jessie Hill)
5. I Like It Like That
6. Little Latin Lupe Lu (#11 CAN)
7. Devil With A Blue Dress On/Good Golly Miss Molly (#5 CAN)
8. Shakin' With Linda
9. Stubborn Kind Of Fellow
10. You Get Your Kicks
11. I Need Help
12. Any Day Now
13. Breakout

- Re-released on the Sundazed Music label, ASIN B000003GX5.

Sock It To Me! (1967)
1. Sock It To Me-Baby (#3 CAN)
2. I Can't Hide It
3. Takin' All I Can Get
4. Slow Fizz
5. Walk On By
6. I Never Had It Better
7. Shakedown Listen Listen
8. A Face In The Crowd
9. I'd Rather Go To Jail
10. Wild Child
11. Too Many Fish In The Sea/Three Little Fishes (#19 CAN)
12. You Are My Sunshine
13. Ruby Baby & Peaches On A Cherry Tree

- Re-released on the Sundazed Music label, ASIN B000003GX6.

All Mitch Ryder Hits! (1967; Collector's Edition with bonus tracks, 1993)
1. Devil With A Blue Dress/Good Golly Miss Molly
2. Jenny Take A Ride
3. Joy (#38 CAN)
4. Breakout
5. In The Midnight Hour
6. Sock It To Me - Baby!
7. Little Latin Lupe Lu
8. Takin' All I Can Get
9. Too Many Fish In The Sea/Three Little Fishes
10. I'd Rather Go To Jail
11. Shake A Tail Feather
12. (You've Got) Personality/Chantilly Lace (bonus track) (#45 CAN)
13. Baby I Need Your Loving/Theme For Mitch (bonus track)

- Re-released on the Sundazed Music label, ASIN B000003GXU.

=== The Detroit Wheels ===
- "Dancing In The Street"/"A Taste of Money" (single - Impact 1029, 6/67)
- "Linda Sue Dixon"/"Tally Ho" (single - Inferno 5002, 4/68)
- "Think (About the Good Things)"/"For the Love of a Stranger" (single - Inferno 5003, 9/68)

=== The Band Detroit ===
Detroit featuring Mitch Ryder (1971) Paramount/MCA label, ASIN B00004VPJG.

1. Long Neck Goose
2. Is It You (Or Is It Me)
3. Box of Old Roses
4. It Ain't Easy
5. Rock 'N' Roll
6. Let It Rock
7. Drink
8. Gimme Shelter^{*}
9. I Found A New Love
^{*}Bonus track on CD that was not on original album

== Members ==
The original members were:

- Mitch Ryder - lead vocals, percussion
- Jim McCarty - lead guitar
- John Deleone - drums, percussion
- Mark Manko - lead guitar
- Joe Kubert - rhythm guitar
- Earl Elliott - bass (replaced early on)
- Jim McCallister - bass (replaced Earl Elliot in 1966, pictured on album displayed on this page)
- Johnny "Bee" Badanjek - drums

In a later offshoot of the band called Detroit, there were:

- Rusty Day - lead and backing vocals, harmonica, percussion
- Steve Gaines - guitars, backing and lead vocals
- Bill Hodgson - guitars
- Steve Hunter - guitars
- Nathaniel Peterson - bass, backing vocals
- Terry Emery - keyboards, backing and lead vocals
- Ted "T-Mel" Smith - drums, backing and lead vocals, percussion
- Wilson Owens - drums, percussion
