= Migration (The Amboy Dukes album) =

Studio album by The Amboy Dukes
- Released: 1969
- Genre: Psychedelic rock; blues rock; hard rock
- Length: 36:11
- Label: Mainstream

The Amboy Dukes chronology
Journey to the Center of the Mind (1968)	Migration (1969)	Marriage on the Rocks/Rock Bottom (1970)

Migration is the third studio album by the American rock band the Amboy Dukes, released in 1969 by Mainstream Records.

== Composition ==
AllMusic has suggested that Migration reflects a stronger influence from Ted Nugent than the previous Amboy Dukes albums, citing the absence of drug-related themes in the lyrics due to Nugent's anti-drug stance, as well as the lack of a ‘spaced-out’ follow-up to "Journey to the Center of the Mind", the band's biggest hit. The band also took a more eclectic approach to composition on Migration. "I'm Not a Juvenile Delinquent' is a cover of a song by Frankie Lymon and the Teenagers."

== Reception ==
Professional ratings
Review scores
Source	Rating
AllMusic	4/5 stars
Collector's Guide to Heavy Metal	6/10

Migration received a mostly mediocre reception upon its release. In a retrospective review, AllMusic described the album as ‘more ambitious’ than Journey to the Center of the Mind and suggested that Migration ‘might be the better of the two discs, if not the best of the Amboy Dukes’ career.’

== Track listing ==
Side A
No.	Title	Writer(s)	Length
1.	"Migration"	Ted Nugent	6:21
2.	"Prodigal Man"	Nugent	9:09
3.	"For His Namesake"	Steve Farmer	4:39
Total length:			19:52

Side B
No.	Title	Writer(s)	Length
4.	"I'm Not a Juvenile Delinquent"	Morris Levy	2:03
5.	"Good Natured Emma"	Nugent	4:48
6.	"Inside the Outside"	Farmer	3:36
7.	"Shades of Green and Grey"	Farmer	3:19
8.	"Curb Your Elephant"	Andy Solomon	4:02
9.	"Loaded for Bear"	Nugent	3:17
Total length:			20:29

== Personnel ==
- Rusty Day – lead vocals, percussion
- Ted Nugent – lead vocals, lead guitar, percussion
- Steve Farmer – rhythm guitar, vocals, strings
- Andy Solomon – keyboards, vocals, horns, percussion, strings
- Greg Arama – bass, bass vocals, percussion
- Dave Palmer – drums, percussion
