= Journey to the Center of the Mind =

Studio album by The Amboy Dukes
- Released: April 1968
- Recorded: 1967, New York, NY
- Genre: Psychedelia; garage rock; hard rock
- Length: 39:15
- Label: Mainstream
- Producer: Bob Shad

The Amboy Dukes chronology
The Amboy Dukes (1967)	Journey to the Center of the Mind (1968)	Migration (1969)

Singles from Journey to the Center of the Mind
- 1. "Journey to the Center of the Mind" Released: June 1968

Journey to the Center of the Mind is the second studio album released by The Amboy Dukes. Released in April 1968 on Mainstream Records, the album is best remembered for its hit single title track, which charted at No.16 on the Billboard singles chart.

The album demonstrates a more pop-oriented approach than the band's debut album, as well as a psychedelic, garage rock, and hard rock sound. Retrospective commentary on the album has called it a classic album of 1968.

== Composition ==
According to Ultimate Classic Rock, the Journey to the Center of the Mind album "bridged psychedelia and hard rock". Singers Room described the album as "a blend of garage rock and psychedelic influences". The album also demonstrates more of a pop sensibility than the band's debut. Steve Farmer co-wrote the hit title track and entirely wrote most of the ambitious suite that makes up the album's second side. The album opens with two blues-influenced rock songs, "Mississippi Murderer" and "Surrender to Your Kings". Ultimate Classic Rock said that "Why Is a Carrot More Orange Than an Orange" delved "deeper into waters more familiar to the Strawberry Alarm Clock or even the Lemon Pipers" with "pseudo-intellectual gibberish lyrics and an almost bubblegum musical approach".

The album also showcases Ted Nugent's guitar skills, with Ultimate Classic Rock writing, "His lead on 'Flight of the Byrd' [is] down and dirty, while his playing on 'Scottish Tea' is highly melodic and inventive". AllMusic said that producer Bob Shad contributed to the album's distinctive sound by recording Nugent's guitar as if Journey to the Center of the Mind was "a mainstream jazz album".

== Reception ==
Professional ratings
Review scores
Source	Rating
AllMusic	3/5 stars
Collector's Guide to Heavy Metal	6/10

The "Journey to the Center of the Mind" single, released in June 1968, charted at No. 16 on the Billboard singles chart, while the album only charted at No. 74 on the albums chart. Being their most successful album, it also stayed on the chart longer than their other albums, staying on the chart for 23 weeks in total.

In retrospective reviews, AllMusic said that the album was "hard-hitting, well-done psychedelic music, recorded with taste". Singers Room ranked the album as the 83rd best album of 1968, describing it as "a classic album that is a must-listen for fans of psychedelic rock."

== Track listing ==
Side A
No.	Title	Writer(s)	Length
1.	"Mississippi Murderer"	Ted Nugent; Steve Farmer	5:12
2.	"Surrender to Your Kings"	Nugent	2:52
3.	"Flight of the Byrd"	Nugent	2:50
4.	"Scottish Tea"	Nugent	4:01
5.	"Dr. Slingshot"	Nugent; Farmer	3:09
Total length:			18:34

Side B
No.	Title	Writer(s)	Length
6.	"Journey to the Center of the Mind"	Nugent; Farmer	3:33
7.	"Ivory Castles"	Farmer	3:21
8.	"Why Is a Carrot More Orange Than an Orange"	Farmer	2:26
9.	"Missionary Mary"	Farmer	2:35
10.	"Death Is Life"	Farmer	2:08
11.	"Saint Philips Friend"	Farmer	3:33
12.	"I'll Prove I'm Right"	Farmer	1:38
13.	"Conclusion"	Nugent; Farmer	1:57
Total length:			21:43

== Personnel ==
The Amboy Dukes

- John (J.B.) Drake – vocals
- Ted Nugent – lead guitar, vocals
- Steve Farmer – rhythm guitar, vocals
- Greg Arama – bass
- Dave Palmer – drums
- Andy Solomon – organ, piano, vocals

Technical

- Bob Shad – producer
- Roy Cicala – engineer
- Maxine Epstein – album coordinator
- Jack Lonshein – cover design

== Charts ==
Chart (1968)	Peak position
US Billboard Top LPs	74
