= The Amboy Dukes (band) =

American rock band

- The Amboy Dukes. From left to right: Dave Palmer, Andy Solomon, Rusty Day, Ted Nugent, Steve Farmer (foreground), and Greg Arama.

Background information
- Origin: Chicago, Illinois, U.S.
- Genres: Psychedelic rock; acid rock; hard rock; proto-metal; proto-punk
- Years active: 1964–1975
- Labels: Mainstream; Polydor; DiscReet; Vogue Schallplatten
- Past members: Ted Nugent; Dave Palmer; Steve Farmer; John Drake; Rick Lober; Bill White; Greg Arama; Andy Solomon; Rusty Day; K.J. Knight; Rob Ruzga; Rob Grange; Andy Jezowski; Vic Mastrianni; Gabriel Magno; Butch Giese

The Amboy Dukes were an American rock band formed in 1964 in Chicago, Illinois, and later based in Detroit, Michigan. They are best known for their only hit single, "Journey to the Center of the Mind". The band's name comes from the title of a novel by Irving Shulman. In the UK, the group's records were released under the name of the American Amboy Dukes, because of the existence of a British group with the same name. The band went through a number of personnel changes during its active years, the only constant being lead guitarist and songwriter Ted Nugent. The band transitioned to being Nugent's backing band before he discontinued the name in 1975.

== Origins ==
Ted Nugent, the nucleus of the Amboy Dukes, was born and raised in Detroit and started performing in 1958 at age 10. He played in a group called the Royal High Boys from 1960 to 1962 and later in group named the Lourds, where he first met future Amboy Dukes lead vocalist John Drake. Nugent played with the Lourds until his family moved to Illinois, where he founded the Amboy Dukes in the Chicago area in 1964, playing at The Cellar, in the Chicago suburb of Arlington Heights, among other venues. They later relocated back to Nugent's hometown of Detroit. The members included the following:

- Ted Nugent (lead guitar)
- Bob Lehnert (vocalist) – who released a single "Better Than Today" with the band Acrobat in 1972
- Gary Hicks (guitar, vocals)
- Dick Treat (bass, vocals)
- Gail Uptadale (drums)

The original lineup did not release any recordings.

== Musical style ==
The Encyclopedia of Heavy Metal Music says that the Amboy Dukes were a psychedelic rock band that "pioneered a proto-metal and psychedelic combination". Later in life, the fiercely anti-drug Ted Nugent would claim that the Amboy Dukes did not celebrate drug use as other late-1960s and early 1970s bands did. Online music journalist Jason Ankeny would later write that second guitarist Steve Farmer "penned the drug-fixated lyrics, adding a psychedelic sensibility to an otherwise proto-metal sound". Other 21st century lookbacks at the band categorize their music acid rock as well as hard rock. They have also been called a proto-punk band.

Nugent's iconic guitar playing style with his signature Gibson Byrdland positioned high on his chest visually distinguished him from other players. He combined this with his natural virtuosity and frenzied playing style on lead, adding sonic distinction to his unusual visual approach. This gave him an edge as a performing artist. Nugent's appreciation for his guitar inspired him to compose the song "Flight of the Byrd", which was released as a single and as part of their most popular album, Journey to the Center of the Mind.

== Band line-ups ==
Band member line-ups credited on official studio albums:
(Others who may have appeared at live dates between albums are not listed, with the exception of the 1972 band)

=== 1967 ===
After a member shuffle for signing a deal with Mainstream Records of New York City, the personnel on their debut album, The Amboy Dukes, was:

- Ted Nugent – lead guitar, vocals
- John Drake – vocals; ex-The Lourds
- Steve Farmer – guitar, vocals; ex-The Gang
- Dave Palmer – drums; ex-The Galaxy Five, ex-The Citations
- Rick Lober – keyboards
- Bill White – bass, vocals

=== 1968 ===
Journey to the Center of the Mind replaced Lober on keyboards and White on bass:

- Ted Nugent – lead guitar, vocals
- John Drake – vocals
- Steve Farmer – guitar, vocals
- Dave Palmer – drums
- Andy Solomon – organ, piano, vocals; ex-The Apostles
- Greg Arama – bass; ex-The Gang

=== 1969 ===
Migration had Drake replaced on vocals:

- Ted Nugent – lead guitar, vocals
- Steve Farmer – guitar, vocals
- Dave Palmer – drums
- Andy Solomon – keyboards, sax, vocals
- Greg Arama – bass
- Rusty Day – vocals, harmonica; pre-Cactus

=== 1970 ===
Marriage on the Rocks/Rock Bottom dropped Farmer and Day:

- Ted Nugent – lead guitar, vocals
- Dave Palmer – drums
- Andy Solomon – keyboards, vocals
- Greg Arama – bass

=== 1971 ===
Survival of the Fittest Live dropped Palmer and Arama. As the sole original member, Nugent changed the bandname to Ted Nugent and the Amboy Dukes:

- Ted Nugent – lead guitar, vocals
- Andy Solomon – keyboards, vocals
- K.J. Knight – drums, vocals; ex-The Day & Night Dealers Blues Band
- Rob Ruzga – bass; ex-The Day & Night Dealers Blues Band

=== 1972 ===
In 1972, the band had no record contract. There were two lineups:

Early summer:

- Ted Nugent – lead guitar, vocals
- Dave Gilbert – lead vocals
- Bill White – bass
- Keith Johnstone – drums

Late summer:

- Ted Nugent – lead guitar, vocals
- John Angelos – lead vocals, harmonica
- Rob Grange – bass
- Joe Vitale – drums, piano, flute

This group recorded some demos at Criteria Studios in Florida, which were never released.

=== 1973 ===
Call of the Wild saw another line-up:

- Ted Nugent – lead guitar, percussion, vocals
- Rob Grange – bass, vocals, arrangements, composer
- Vic Mastrianni – drums, vocals
- Andy Jezowski – vocals
- Gabriel Magno – flute, keyboards

=== 1974 ===
Tooth Fang & Claw was the group's final lineup, dropping Magno:

- Ted Nugent – lead guitar, percussion, vocals
- Rob Grange – bass, vocals, arrangements, composer
- Vic Mastrianni – drums, percussion, vocals
- Andy Jezowski – vocals

Liner notes also credited "Rev. Atrocious Theodosius," a fictitious name, on guitar and vocals.

== Later happenings ==
Nugent went on to have a successful solo career in the 1970s and joined the Damn Yankees supergroup in the late 1980s. Since the 2000s, Nugent (although continuing his rock career) has been a prominent activist, both for hunting and for conservative politics.

Vocalist Rusty Day joined the band Detroit, replacing Mitch Ryder as lead vocalist. It disbanded in 1974. He then returned to his previous band, Cactus, in 1976, playing with them until 1979. He turned down offers to front AC/DC and Lynyrd Skynyrd after the deaths of those bands' respective lead singers. Day was shot dead in 1982.

Bassist Greg Arama died in a motorcycle accident on September 18, 1979.

Steve Farmer later taught in Redford Township, Michigan. He also performed with backing bands at various venues in and around the Detroit area. Farmer died on April 7, 2020, aged 71.

Rick Lober is a classically trained composer best known in the greater Detroit metro area for his frenetic style of keyboard playing. Since the early 1990s, he has been in and out of the studio, appearing as performer/songwriter on the Steve Farmer CD Journey to the Darkside of the Mind (Saint Thomas Records, STP0069) completed in 2000. He is currently working in the studio and performing live with local Detroit rock legend Jeffrey Faust and his band The Woodsman, which performs throughout Michigan and Canada.

In 2008, the Amboy Dukes were inducted into the Michigan Rock and Roll Legends Hall of Fame. The original Amboy Dukes (featuring Nugent, Drake, Farmer, Lober, Solomon and White) performed on April 17, 2009, at the Detroit Music Awards at The Fillmore Detroit. Their performance began with the song "Baby Please Don't Go", from their 1967 debut single. This was followed by "Journey to the Center of the Mind", and ending with Mitch Ryder's "Jenny Take A Ride" (featuring original Ryder drummer Johnny "Bee" Badanjek). In recognition of the band's contribution to rock music history, they received a Distinguished Achievement award. As the band left the stage, Nugent thanked all his fellow band members and told the crowd "And everyone knows that The Amboy Dukes are the ultimate garage band on planet earth".

Lead singer John Drake died on August 29, 2021, aged 74.

== Discography ==
=== Albums ===
| Date of official release | Title | Label | Peak chart positions |
| Date of official release | Title | Label | US Billboard Top LPs |
|---|---|---|---|
| 1967 | The Amboy Dukes | Mainstream S/6104 | 183 |
| 1968 | Journey to the Center of the Mind | Mainstream S/6112 | 74 |
| 1969 | Migration | Mainstream S/6118 | — |
| 1970 | Marriage on the Rocks/Rock Bottom | Polydor 24-4012 | 191 |
| 1971 | Survival of the Fittest Live | Polydor 24-4035 | 129 |
| 1973 | Call of the Wild | DiscReet DS 2181 | — |
| 1974 | Tooth Fang & Claw | DiscReet DS 2203 | — |

=== Singles ===
| Date of official release | Title | Label | Peak chart positions | |
| Date of official release | Title | Label | US | CAN |
|---|---|---|---|---|
| 1967 | "Baby, Please Don't Go" / "Psalms of Aftermath" | Mainstream 676 | 106 | — |
| 1968 | "Journey to the Center of the Mind" / "Mississippi Murderer" | Mainstream 684 | 16 | 19 |
| 1968 | "You Talk Sunshine, I Breathe Fire" / "Scottish Tea" | Mainstream 693 | 114 | — |
| 1969 | "Prodigal Man" / "Good Natured Emma" | Mainstream 700 | — | — |
| 1969 | "For His Namesake" / "Loaded For Bear" | Mainstream 704 | — | — |
| 1969 | "Flight of the Byrd" / "Ivory Castles" | Mainstream 711 | — | — |
| 1974 | "Sweet Revenge" / "Ain't It the Truth" | DiscReet 1199 | — | — |

=== Other releases ===
- The Best of the Original Amboy Dukes - released after The Amboy Dukes left Mainstream Records (Mainstream S/6125) in 1969, failed to chart.
- Journeys and Migrations - Mainstream compilation double LP with songs from the first 3 Amboy Dukes albums on Mainstream Records (Mainstream 801 - 2 Record Set) in 1973. (no doubles with the Dr. Slingshot compilation)
- Dr. Slingshot - Mainstream compilation with songs from the 1st and 3rd Amboy Dukes albums on Mainstream Records (Mainstream 414) in 1974. (no doubles with the Journeys and Migrations compilation)
- Ted Nugent & The Amboy Dukes, Mainstream compilation (Mainstream 421) from 1976. (First original cover has photo of Ted with snakes for his hair. Second 1982 (reissue) cover shows Ted playing a guitar on stage).
- Journey To The Darkside of The Mind, released in 2000, saw a rebirth of The Amboy Dukes by Steve Farmer and original keyboardist Rick Lober, sans Ted Nugent (Saint Thomas Records STP 0069) - didn't chart.
- Two early songs featuring Drake on lead vocals and composition by Farmer/Nugent have been released as bonus tracks on various compact disc releases. They are titled "J.B. Special" and "Sobbin' In My Mug of Beer" and show the high energy of the first group that recorded as The Amboy Dukes. There are two different versions of "J.B. Special"; a shorter version clocking around 2:21 is quicker tempo with additional lyrics and is titled "alternate version". A more polished and slower tempo version clocks in around 2:33. It was recorded as a follow-up single to their first album but not released at the time. "Sobbin' In My Mug of Beer" is a record-label audition predating the first album sessions.
