= Wrapping Paper =

1966 single by Cream

- Sweden picture sleeve

Single by Cream
- B-side: "Cat's Squirrel"
- Released: October 1966
- Recorded: August 1966
- Studio: Rayik, Chalk Farm
- Genre: Pop, music hall
- Length: 2:25
- Label: Reaction
- Composer(s): Jack Bruce
- Lyricist(s): Pete Brown
- Producer(s): Robert Stigwood

Cream UK singles chronology
"Wrapping Paper" (1966)	"I Feel Free" (1966)

"Wrapping Paper" is a song by the British rock group Cream. Bassist and singer Jack Bruce composed the music, with lyrics by Pete Brown. In 1966, Reaction Records released the song on their debut single, with "Cat's Squirrel" as the B-side. It reached number 34 on the UK Singles Chart in 1966. The song was later included on the compilation albums Superstarshine Vol. 6 / Cream (1972), The Very Best of Cream (1995) and Those Were the Days (1997).

== Background ==
In contrast with the hard blues rock of other early Cream songs such as "N.S.U." and the psychedelic pop-style of "I Feel Free", "Wrapping Paper" has a distinctive slow jazz-like style. The song reflects the band's iconoclastic persona, their desire to confuse their audience, their interest in the absurdist art movement of the time, and refusal to fit into musical categories.

The lyrics to "Wrapping Paper" talk about a man who lost his love and finds himself constantly looking at a picture of himself and his love and keeps wishing to go back "to the house on the shore." The song's lyrics share common similarities with the songs "Dreaming" and "The Coffee Song".

== Personnel ==
- Jack Bruce – lead vocals, bass guitar, piano, cello
- Eric Clapton – backing vocals, guitar
- Ginger Baker – drums, percussion

== Charts ==
Year	Single	Position
Year	Single	UK Top 40
October; 1966	"Wrapping Paper" / "Cat's Squirrel"	34
