= Here Comes the Judge (Pigmeat Markham song) =

Single by Pigmeat Markham

from the album Here Comes the Judge
- B-side: "The Trial"
- Released: 1968
- Genre: Comedy; proto-rap
- Length: 2:40
- Label: Chess
- Songwriters: Pigmeat Markham; Bob Astor; Dick Alen; Sarah Harvey
- Producer: Gene Barge

Pigmeat Markham singles chronology
| "My Wife? No, I Ain't Seen Her (Part 1 / Part 2)" (1961) | "Here Comes the Judge" (1968) | "The Hip Judge" (1968) |

Audio sample
- file; help

"Here Comes the Judge" is a song by American soul and comedy singer Pigmeat Markham, first released as a single in 1968 on the Chess label. The record entered the UK singles chart in July 1968, spending eight weeks on the chart and reaching number 19 as its highest position. The song originated with his signature comedy routine "heyeah (here) come da judge", which featured Markham as a courtroom judge dealing with various legal cases and made a mockery of formal courtroom etiquette. Due to its rhythmic use of boastful rhyming dialogue over a funky drum beat, it is considered a precursor to hip-hop.

The song contained background vocals from soul singer Minnie Riperton, who was credited as Andrea Davis when she was recording for Chess Records, the label that released "Here Comes the Judge". It also featured future Earth, Wind & Fire founder Maurice White, then a staff drummer at Chess Records, on drums providing the signature drum beat to the song.

== Personnel ==
- Pigmeat Markham – vocals
- Andrea Davis – backing vocals
- Cash McCall – guitar
- Gene Barge – saxophone
- Maurice White – drums

== Other songs, cover versions and samples ==
Songs with the same name have been recorded by several artists; most notably, Shorty Long, whose 1968 Tamla Motown song "Here Comes the Judge" also entered the UK chart in July 1968 but only reached number 30 as its highest position. Long's song is completely different from Markham's, however it was inspired by Markham's comic act involving a judge, which Markham performed on Rowan & Martin's Laugh-In. The Markham song was also covered, as a parody, by the British band the Barron Knights, as part of their 1968 single "An Olympic Record". Peter Tosh, the Vapors and the Magistrates have recorded songs called "Here Comes the Judge" but they are different songs.

Markham's original version was prominently sampled by Big Audio Dynamite II during the middle of their song "Rush".
