= Guinness Records (record label) =

American tax scam and music publisher

Guinness Records was the name of an American record label operational in 1977. It was, along with Tiger Lily Records one of the major tax scam labels, releasing around one hundred albums. (Note: To date only 64 albums released by Guinness have been identified, but gaps in the catalog indicate at least 20 more albums remain unaccounted for.)

== History ==
Guinness Records was established in 1977 by Marvin L. Popkin as a tax shelter based around the idea of investing in a master recording that would be greatly over valued so that the investors could claim a tax loss when the deliberately under-promoted album failed to sell.

Most recordings were sourced from recording studio vaults and published as albums without the knowledge or consent of the performers. Several defunct bands are known to have had releases as a result of this practice, but the most high-profile performers identified were Detroit area band The Rockets, Atlantic Starr, who had two unauthorized albums based on demo tapes released under their original name, Newban, independent musician R. Stevie Moore, who had a trio of demos released on an album attributed to a group called Hotgun, and The Vibrations, whose producer Robert John Gallo, provided the masters of the band's final album to Guinness Records, along with several other sets of masters, some unreleased, he had produced for other performers.

The types of albums released by Guinness fell into three broad categories:

- Single band/artist albums based on unpublished material. (e.g. "Rockets", "Snowball")
- Compilation albums based on unpublished material disguised as the debut album of a single band. (e.g. "Hotgun", "Living on Giving")
- Bootleg re-issues of albums previously published on obscure labels. (e.g. "Sum Pear", "Good Vibrations")

Throughout its short existence, the label was closely associated with another tax scam label Dellwood Records, believed to be linked to Prelude Records, which acted as Guinness Records distributor. (Note: All albums released by Guinness Records located to date have the words "Guinness Records nationally distributed by Dellwood Records..." printed on the record label, no albums released by Dellwood have this inscription.)
