= Johnny "Bee" Badanjek =

American drummer

- Born: John Badanjek; June 2, 1948 (age 78); Detroit, Michigan, U.S.
- Genres: Rock
- Occupations: Musician; singer; songwriter
- Instruments: Drums; vocals
- Years active: 1964–present
- Website: johnny-bee.com

Johnny "Bee" Badanjek is an American musician, singer, songwriter and painter, who has been a member of various rock bands, including The Romantics, The Detroit Wheels, Alice Cooper, and Ted Nugent.

== Music career ==
At 16, Badanjek (pronounced: buh-DAN-jek) was the drummer for the Detroit rock and roll band Billy Lee and The Rivieras who later changed their name to Mitch Ryder & The Detroit Wheels. The rock critic Dave Marsh later described him as an "unknown genius" for his drum break on their single "Devil with a Blue Dress On".

After the group disbanded in 1967, Badanjek toured and recorded with Edgar Winter, Alice Cooper, Dr. John, Bob Seger, Ronnie Montrose, Nils Lofgren and others.

In 1972, he co-founded The Rockets, in which he was the drummer and backing vocalist, as well as songwriter. Rockets' singles written by Badanjek included "Can't Sleep", "Turn Up the Radio" and "Takin' It Back".

In 1985, he was part of the Guitar Army Benefit Concert in Detroit with Mark Farner of Grand Funk Railroad and also toured the club and festival circuit with him that year.

In 1992, he toured Europe with Nils Lofgren and drummed on Lofgren's Rykodisc release, The Crooked Line. He later toured and recorded with The Romantics.

In 2021, he played drums on Alice Cooper's Billboard #1 Top Selling Album, Detroit Stories, and released his debut solo album.

== Solo work ==
With his group "Johnny Bee and the Murder Hornets", Badanjek released a 12-song debut solo album, Arc of the Sweeping Sky, with album artwork by Stanley Mouse.

== In media ==
A photo of Badanjek is featured on the cover of The Big Beat: Conversations With Rock's Greatest Drummers by Max Weinberg and Robert Santelli, released in 1984, featuring interviews with 15 of the most notable rock drummers of all time (and Weinberg's favorites) including Ringo Starr, Charlie Watts, Levon Helm, Dino Danelli and Badanjek.

== Art career ==
Badanjek is also a self-taught painter, having learned by studying other painters and their philosophies. His paintings are in collections at The Gallery of the Arts' Johnny Bee Badanjek Gallery. "Johnny Bee Badanjek". The Gallery of the Arts. September 2, 2017. Archived from the original on May 3, 2018.
