= Devil with a Blue Dress On =

1966 single by Mitch Ryder and The Detroit Wheels

"Devil with the Blue Dress"

Single by Shorty Long
- B-side: "Wind It Up"
- Released: 1964
- Genre: R&B
- Length: 2:49
- Label: Soul
- Songwriters: Frederick Long, William Stevenson

Shorty Long singles chronology
"Devil with the Blue Dress" (1964)	"It's a Crying Shame" (1965)

"Devil with a Blue Dress On/Good Golly Miss Molly"

Single by Mitch Ryder and The Detroit Wheels

from the album Breakout...!!!
- B-side: "I Had It Made"
- Released: September 1966
- Studio: Bell Sound (New York City)
- Genre: Rock and roll; R&B
- Length: 3:01 (with "Good Golly, Miss Molly")
- Label: New Voice
- Songwriters: Frederick Long, William Stevenson / John Marascalco, Robert Blackwell
- Producer: Bob Crewe

Mitch Ryder and The Detroit Wheels singles chronology
"Takin' All I Can Get" (1966)	"Devil with a Blue Dress On/Good Golly Miss Molly" (1966)	"Sock It to Me, Baby!" (1967)

"Devil with a Blue Dress On" (also known as "Devil with the Blue Dress") is a song written by Shorty Long and William "Mickey" Stevenson, first recorded by Long in 1964. A later version recorded by Mitch Ryder and The Detroit Wheels in 1966 peaked at No. 4 on the U.S. Billboard Hot 100.

== Song information ==
"Devil with the Blue Dress" was released as Shorty Long's debut single on Motown in 1964. It reached #26 on Billboard's R&B chart and got to #125 on the Hot 100 "Bubbling Under" chart. Despite the song's title, the song describes a femme fatale in a blue dress and not an actual devil.

Two years later, Mitch Ryder and The Detroit Wheels recorded the song at Bell Sound Studios in New York City as a medley with an original arrangement of Little Richard's "Good Golly, Miss Molly". Their version was notably more up-tempo than Long's more blues-influenced rendition. Reaching No. 4 on the Hot 100, their version of the track would end up becoming their most well-known and highest-charting hit in the United States. Rolling Stone ranked it No. 428 on their list of Top 500 Songs of All Time.

== Later versions ==
"Devil with a Blue Dress On" was also recorded by Pratt & McClain, who are best known for the theme from the television series Happy Days. Bruce Springsteen's version of the song was part of the No Nukes concert album in 1980, and he has performed it regularly in concert from the 1970s to the present as part of his "Detroit Medley". A Spanish language version of the song was recorded by Los Lobos and released on the Eating Raoul film soundtrack in 1982. The Duke University basketball pep band plays this song during Blue Devil home games and after Blue Devil victories at Cameron Indoor Stadium in Durham, North Carolina. The Grateful Dead played the song as part of their live act in 1987, always sung by Brent Mydland and paired with Good Golly, Miss Molly. A version of the song was recorded by Nicholas O'Har for the 1990 spoof of The Exorcist, Repossessed. In 2007, Bill Kirchen recorded a version on his Hammer of the Honky Tonk Gods CD.
