= Pigmeat Markham =

American entertainer (1904–1981)

- Born: Dewey Markham; April 18, 1904; Durham, North Carolina, U.S.
- Died: December 13, 1981 (aged 77); The Bronx, New York City, U.S.
- Occupations: Comedian; actor; singer; dancer
- Years active: 1917–1981
- Spouse: Bernice Markham (m. ?–1981)

Dewey "Pigmeat" Markham (April 18, 1904 – December 13, 1981) was an American entertainer. Though best known as a comedian, Markham was also a singer, dancer, and actor. His nickname came from a stage routine, in which he declared himself to be "Sweet Poppa Pigmeat". He was sometimes credited in films as Pigmeat "Alamo" Markham.

He is also known for his 1968 single "Here Comes the Judge", which is considered to be a pioneering hip-hop record.

== Early life and career ==
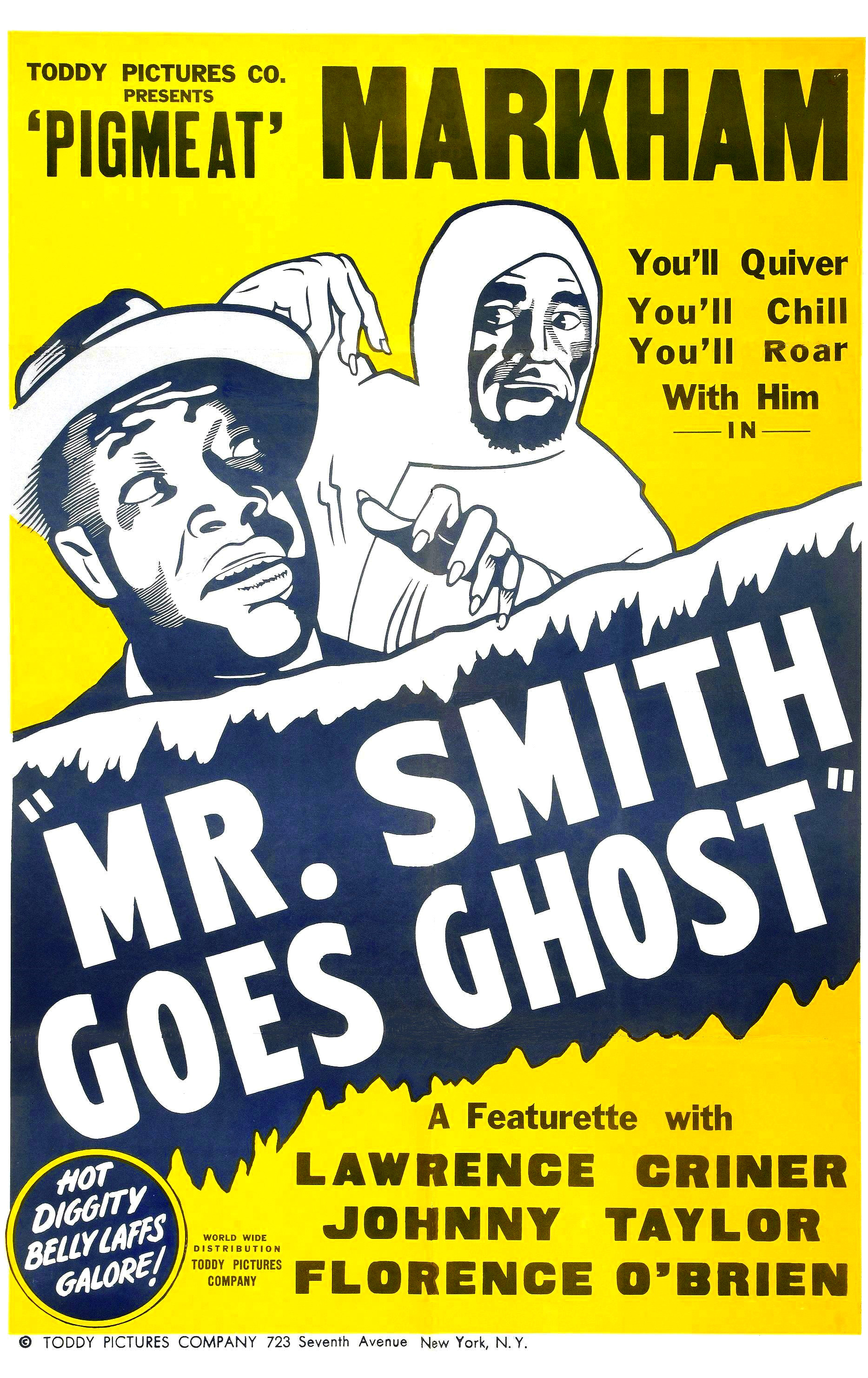
Poster for the 1940 short subject Mr. Smith Goes Ghost

Markham was born in Durham, North Carolina. His family was the most prominent on their street, which came to be called (and later officially named) Markham Street in the Hayti District. Markham began his career in traveling music and burlesque shows. For a time he was a member of Bessie Smith's Traveling Revue in the 1920s. Later, he claimed he originated the Truckin' dance which became nationally popular at the start of the 1930s. In the 1940s he started making film appearances. In 1946 he recorded "Open the Door, Richard".

Markham was a familiar act at New York's famed Apollo Theater where he wore blackface makeup and huge painted white lips, despite complaints the vaudeville tradition was degrading. The book Showtime at the Apollo suggests, "He probably played the Apollo more often than any other performer." Starting in the 1950s Pigmeat Markham began appearing on television, making multiple appearances on The Ed Sullivan Show.

His boisterous, indecorous "heyeah (here) come da judge" schtick, which made a mockery of formal courtroom etiquette, became his signature routine. Markham would sit at an elevated judge's bench (often in a black graduation cap-and-gown, to look more impressive), and deal with a series of comic miscreants. He would often deliver his "judgments", as well as express frustration with the accused, by leaning over the bench and smacking the accused with an inflated bladder-balloon. He had hit comedy recordings in the 1960s on Chess Records, and saw his routine's entry line become a catchphrase on the Rowan & Martin's Laugh-In NBC television show, as did his phrase "Look that up in your Funk & Wagnalls."

Markham's most famous routine was "discovered" by the general public only after Sammy Davis Jr. had performed it as a guest on the March 25, 1968 episode of Laugh-In. Due to the years of racial segregation in the American entertainment industry, he was not widely known by white audiences, and had almost exclusively performed on the "Chitlin' Circuit" of vaudeville, theatres, and night clubs and appeared in several race films, including William D. Alexander's 1949 revue film Burlesque in Harlem, which documented the Chitlin' Circuit.

The phenomenal ripple effect of Davis's version of "the judge" led to Markham's opportunity to perform his signature Judge character himself as a Laugh-In regular during the 1968–69 television season. Archie Campbell later adapted Markham's routine, performing as "Justus O'Peace," on the country version of Laugh-In, Hee Haw, which borrowed heavily from the minstrel show tradition.

"Here Comes the Judge"
"Here Comes the Judge" (1968) contains boastful rhyming dialogue over a funky drum beat, symbolizing a precursor to hip-hop.

Thanks to his Heyeah come da judge routine, which originally was accompanied by music with a funky beat, Pigmeat Markham is regarded as a forerunner of rap. His song "Here Comes the Judge" peaked at number 19 on the Billboard and other charts in 1968. He published an autobiography, Here Come the Judge!, in the wake of his Laugh-In success.

The song "Here Comes the Judge" was prominently sampled by Big Audio Dynamite II in the song "Rush".

== Death ==
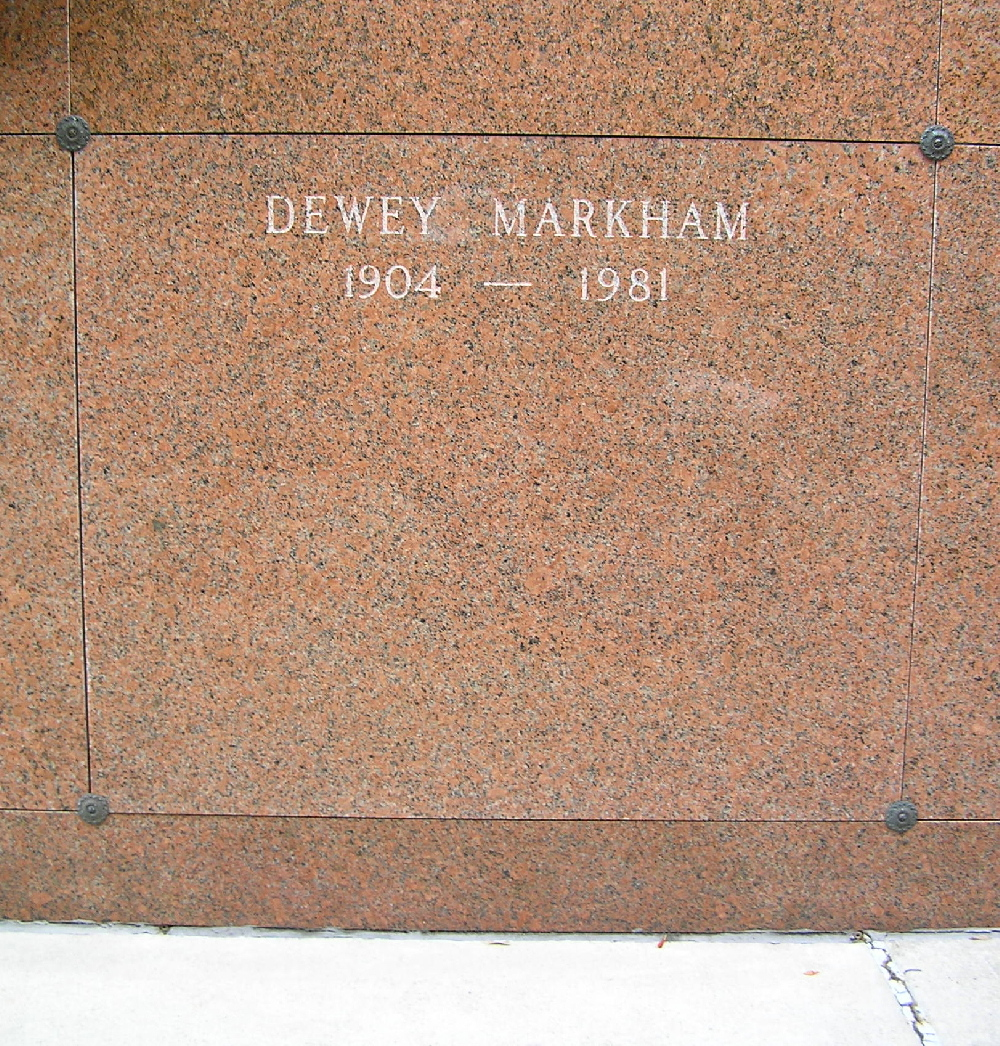
The crypt of Dewey Markham in Woodlawn Cemetery, The Bronx New York

Markham died of a stroke at Montefiore Medical Center in the Bronx on December 13, 1981, at the age of 77. He is buried in Woodlawn Cemetery in The Bronx, New York City.

== Discography ==
=== Albums ===
- At the Party (1961)
- The Trial (1961)
- Anything Goes with Pigmeat (1962)
- Open the Door Richard (1963)
- The World's Greatest Clown (1963)
- The Best of Moms and Pigmeat Volume One (1964) (with Moms Mabley)
- Mr. Funny Man (1965)
- This'll Kill Ya! (1965)
- One More Time... (1966) (with Moms Mabley)
- If You Can't Be Good, Be Careful! (1966)
- Mr. Vaudeville (1967)
- Save Your Soul, Baby! (1967)
- Here Come the Judge (1968)
- Tune Me In (1968)
- The Hustlers (1968)
- Backstage (1968)
- Pigmeat's Bag (1968)
- Would the Real Pigmeat Markham Please Sit Down (1973)
- The Crap-Shootin' Rev

=== Singles ===
Year	Single	Chart Positions			
Year	Single	US	US R&B	UK	AU
1945	"How Long, How Long Blues"	-	-	-	-
1945	"Blues Before Sunrise"	-	-	-	-
1946	"See See Rider"	-	-	-	-
1961	"My Wife? No, I Ain't Seen Her"	-	-	-	-
1968	"Here Comes the Judge"	19	4	19	71
1968	"Sock It to 'Em Judge"	103	-	-	-
1970	"Pig's Popcorn"	-	-	-	-
