= Mitch Ryder =

American rock singer (born 1945)

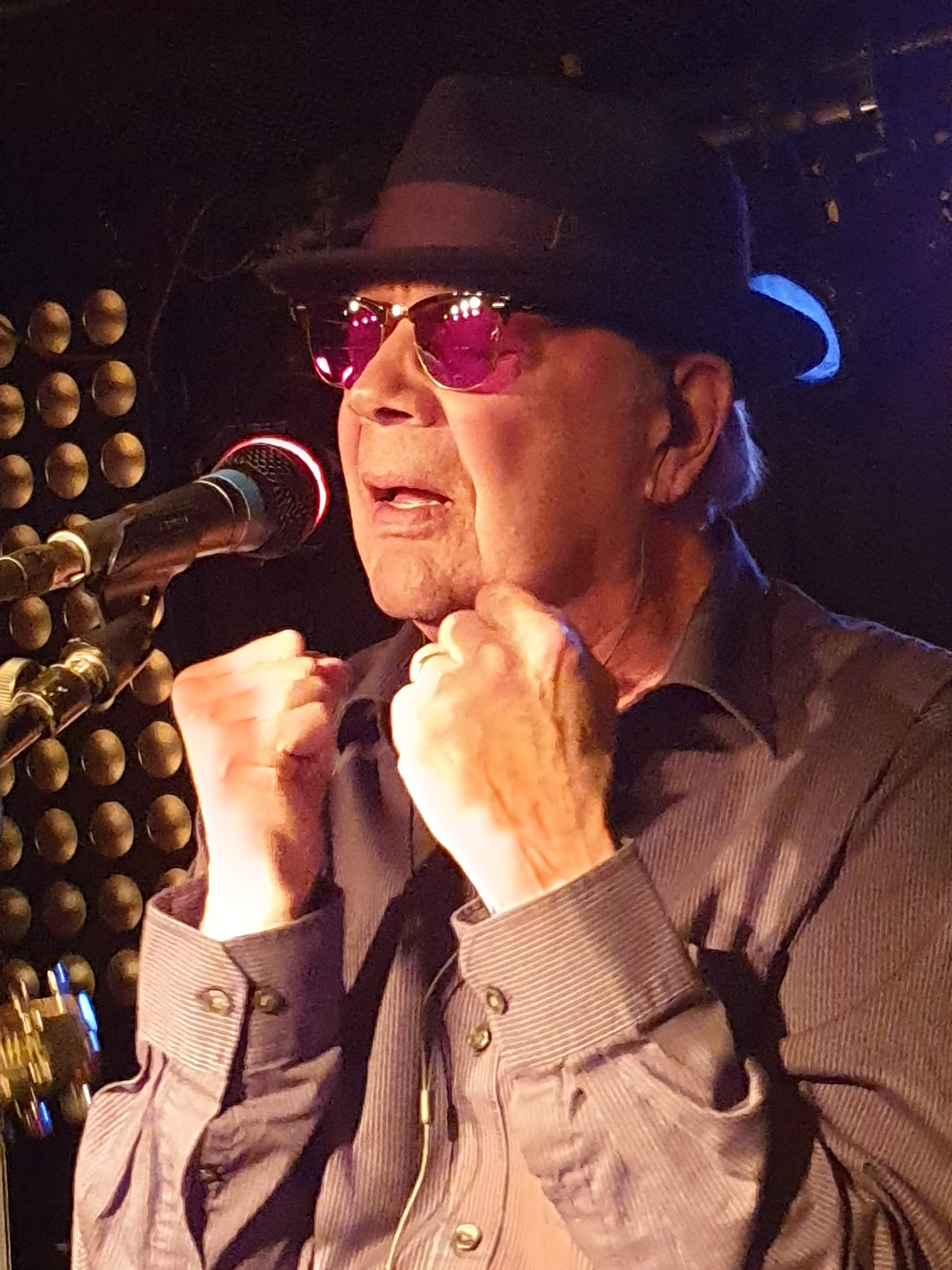
- Ryder performing in Germany in 2023

Background information
- Born: William Sherille Levise Jr. February 26, 1945 (age 81); Hamtramck, Michigan, U.S.
- Genres: Rock and roll; rhythm and blues; blue-eyed soul; frat rock; hard rock
- Occupations: Singer; songwriter
- Years active: 1962–present
- Website: mitchryder.net

William Sherille Levise Jr. (born February 26, 1945), known professionally as Mitch Ryder, is an American rock singer who has recorded more than 25 albums over more than four decades.

== Career ==
Ryder was born on February 26, 1945, in Hamtramck, Michigan. He spent his high school years in Warren, Michigan, a suburb north of Detroit. He formed his first band, Tempest, when he was in high school, and the group gained some notice playing at a Detroit soul music club called The Village. Ryder next appeared fronting a band named Billy Lee & The Rivieras, which had limited success until they met songwriter / record producer Bob Crewe. He selected his stage name when he saw "Mitch Ryder" in the Manhattan telephone directory and renamed the group Mitch Ryder & The Detroit Wheels. They recorded several hit records for his DynoVoice Records and New Voice labels in the mid to late 1960s, most notably 1966's "Devil with a Blue Dress On", their highest-charting single at number four, as well as "Jenny Take a Ride!" which reached number 10 in 1965, and "Sock It to Me, Baby!", a number six hit in 1967. The Detroit Wheels were John Badanjek on drums, Mark Manko on lead guitar, Joe Kubert (not to be confused with the comic book illustrator Joe Kubert) on rhythm guitar, Jim McCarty (not to be confused with the Yardbirds drummer of the same name) on lead guitar and Jim McAllister on bass.

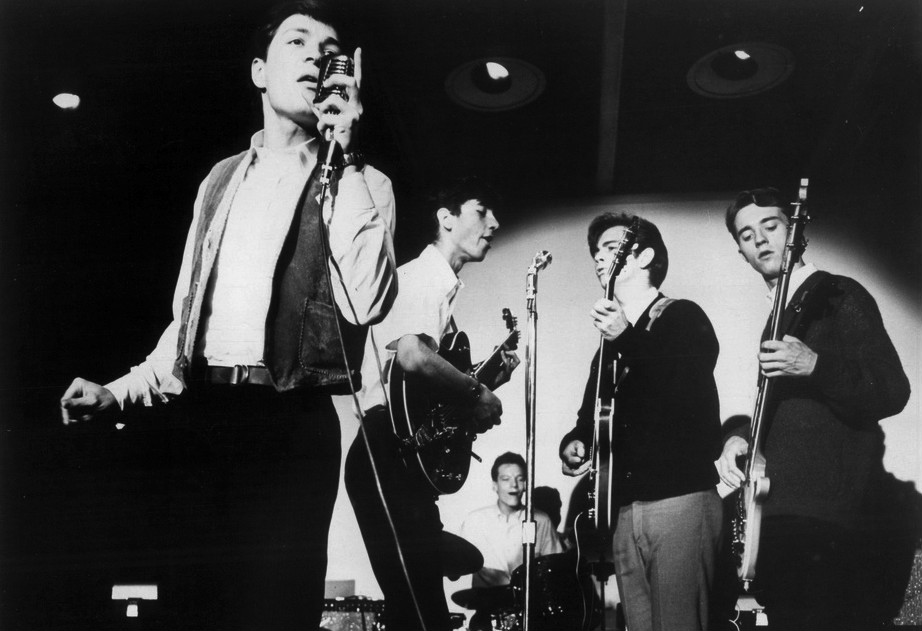
Mitch Ryder and the Detroit Wheels performing in 1966

In December 1966, producer Bob Crewe's vision for Mitch as a blue-eyed soul singer backed by a horn band (a la Wilson Pickett, Joe Tex, etc.) was put into motion. They assembled a 10 piece band of white R&B musicians: from Baltimore, Maryland; Jimmy Wilson (trumpet), Bob Shipley (sax), Jimmy Loomis (sax), Don Lehnhoff (trombone), Frank Invernizzi (organ); from Chicago, Illinois; John Siomos (drums), Bob Slawson (guitar), Carmine Riale (bass guitar); from Miami, Florida; Andy Dio (trumpet); from New York; Doug Rodrigues (lead guitar). The band rehearsed for a month in a dance studio above Cheetah, a night club at Broadway and 53rd, then hit the road as The Mitch Ryder Show in February 1967.

Ryder was the last person to perform with Otis Redding; they performed the song "Knock On Wood", on December 9, 1967, in Cleveland, Ohio, on a local TV show called Upbeat. Redding and four members of his touring band, The Bar-Kays, died in a plane crash near Madison, Wisconsin the following day, December 10, 1967.

Ryder's musical endeavors were less successful after the early 1970s. Ryder's participation with the Detroit Wheels ended just as the counterculture was becoming dominant in 1968. During 1968, trumpeters Mike Thuroff and John Stefan were hired to tour with his horn section and band. Thuroff and Stefan also recorded the trumpet parts of Ryder's song, "Ring My Bell". This song was not permitted to be played by radio in many states due to its sexual innuendos. Ryder had one hit single from that period, a cover version of "What Now, My Love". In the early 70's, he formed the band Detroit. The only other original Wheel in the group was the drummer John Badanjek; other members were guitarists Steve Hunter, Brett Tuggle, organist Harry Phillips, and bassist W.R. Cooke. A single album was released by this grouping, a 1971 self-titled LP issued on Paramount Records (US number 176 in 1972). They had a hit with their version of the Lou Reed-penned song "Rock & Roll", which Reed liked enough to ask Steve Hunter to join his backing band. Detroit was tagged by the critics as the "American Rolling Stones".

According to AllMusic (which calls Ryder "the unsung hero" of Michigan rock and roll), Ryder withdrew from music in 1973 after experiencing throat trouble, moving to Colorado with his wife and taking up writing and painting. In 1983, Ryder returned to a major label with the John Mellencamp-produced album Never Kick a Sleeping Dog. The album featured a cover version of the Prince song "When You Were Mine", which was Ryder's last score on the Billboard Hot 100.

Ryder continues to record and tour in the United States and Europe. In 2005, Mitch Ryder & The Detroit Wheels were inducted into the Michigan Rock and Roll Legends Hall of Fame. In 2009, Mitch Ryder was inducted as a solo artist. On February 14, 2012, Ryder released The Promise, his first US release in almost 30 years.

== Influence ==
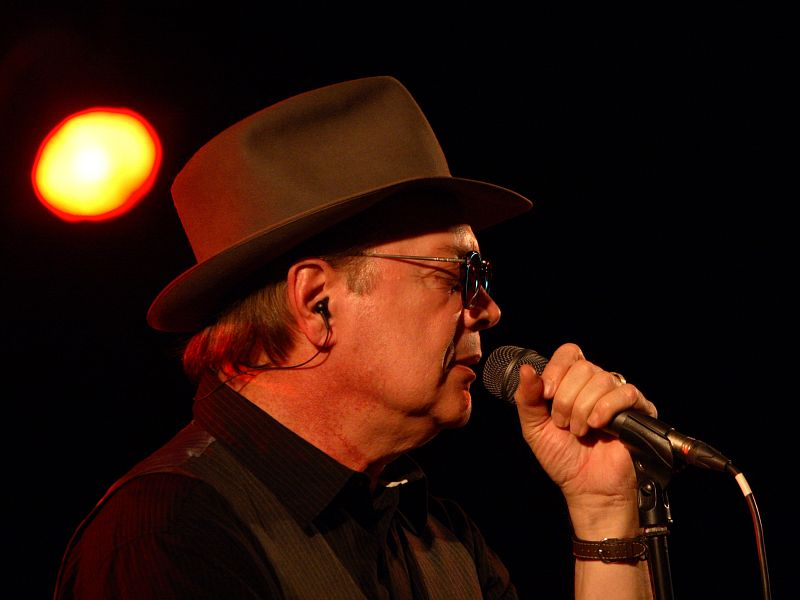
Ryder in 2008

Ryder has influenced the music of such blue collar rock music artists as Bob Seger, John Mellencamp, and also Bruce Springsteen, whose version of the song "Devil With a Blue Dress" was part of the No Nukes concert album in the early 1980s. He has also been cited as a primary musical influence by Ted Nugent.

In concert, Bruce Springsteen has often featured a performance informally known as "Detroit Medley" that includes the songs "Devil with a Blue Dress", "Jenny Take a Ride", "Good Golly Miss Molly" and "C.C. Rider". The medley from time to time blends in a variety of other songs, but this remains the core section, often featuring guitar solos from Springsteen and piano solos by Roy Bittan.

Winona Ryder, the stage name of Winona Laura Horowitz, was inspired by Mitch Ryder's music.

Ryder has been credited by guitarist Steve Hunter for giving Hunter his first real break in rock and roll and introducing Hunter to producer Bob Ezrin. In 2017 he was inducted into the Rhythm & Blues Hall of Fame.

Ritchie Blackmore acknowledged the influence of Mitch Ryder and the Detroit Wheels on the type of beat Deep Purple chose for their version of "Kentucky Woman", the song by Neil Diamond.

== Discography ==
=== Singles ===
- That's the Way It's Gonna Be / Fool For You (Carrie 1515, Sep 1962) as Billy Lee & The Rivieras
- Won't You Dance With Me / You Know (Hyland 3016, 1964) as Billy Lee & The Rivieras
- I Need Help / I Hope (New Voice 801, Aug 1965)
- Jenny Take a Ride! [Jenny, Jenny & C.C. Rider] / Baby Jane (Mo-Mo Jane) (New Voice 806, Nov 1965) #10 Billboard Hot 100
- Little Latin Lupe Lu / I Hope (New Voice 808, Feb 1966) #17 Billboard Hot 100
- Break Out / I Need Help (New Voice 811, May 1966) #62 Billboard Hot 100
- Takin' All I Can Get / You Get Your Kicks (New Voice 814, Jul 1966) #100 Billboard Hot 100
- Devil With a Blue Dress On & Good Golly, Miss Molly / I Had It Made (New Voice 817, Sep 1966) #4 Billboard Hot 100
- Sock It To Me – Baby! / I Never Had It Better (New Voice 820, Jan 1967) #6 Billboard Hot 100
- Too Many Fish In the Sea & Three Little Fishes / One Grain of Sand (New Voice 822, Apr 1967) #24 Billboard Hot 100
- Joy / I'd Rather Go To Jail (New Voice 824, Jun 1967) -
- What Now My Love / Blessing In Disguise (DynoVoice 901, Aug 1967)
- You Are My Sunshine / Wild Child (New Voice 826, Oct 1967) -
- Come See About Me / A Face In the Crowd (New Voice 828, Dec 1967)
- Personality & Chantilly Lace / I Make a Fool of Myself (DynoVoice 905, Jan 1968)
- Ruby Baby & Peaches On a Cherry Tree / You Get Your Kicks (New Voice 830, May 1968) -
- The Lights of Night / I Need Lovin' You (DynoVoice 916, May 1968)
- Ring Your Bell / Baby, I Need Your Loving & Theme For Mitch (DynoVoice 934, Dec 1968)
- Sugar Bee / I Believe (There Must Be Someone) (Dot 17290, Aug 1969)
- Direct Me / It's Been a Long, Long, Long Time (Dot 17325, Dec 1969)
- I Can't See Nobody / The Girl From the North Country (Paramount 0051, Sep 1970) as Detroit
- Rock 'n' Roll / Box of Old Roses (Paramount 0133, Dec 1971) as Detroit
- Oo La La La Dee Da Doo / Gimme Shelter (Paramount 0158, Apr 1972) as Detroit
- When You Were Mine / Stand (Riva/Polygram 213, May 1983) as Mitch Ryder #87 Billboard Hot 100
- Like a Rolling Stone / Can Do (Personal 19820, 1985) as Mitch Ryder

all releases on New Voice are credited to Mitch Ryder & The Detroit Wheels, except numbers 824/826/830; all releases on DynoVoice are credited to Mitch Ryder (solo)

=== Albums ===
Mitch Ryder & The Detroit Wheels

- 1966 Take A Ride... (New Voice)
- 1966 Breakout...!!! (New Voice)
- 1967 Sock It To Me! (New Voice)
- 1967 All Mitch Ryder Hits! (New Voice)
- 1967 All The Heavy Hits of Mitch Ryder (Crewe)
- 1968 Mitch Ryder Sings The Hits (New Voice)
- 1972 Greatest Hits (Virgo)

Detroit featuring Mitch Ryder

- 1971 Detroit (Paramount/MCA)

Mitch Ryder (solo)

- 1967 What Now My Love (DynoVoice)
- 1969 The Detroit – Memphis Experiment (with Booker T and the MGs) (Dot)
- 1979 How I Spent My Vacation (Line)
- 1980 Naked But Not Dead (Line)
- 1981 Live Talkies (Line)
- 1981 Got Change for a Million (Line)
- 1981 Look Ma, No Wheels (Quality)
- 1981 Greatest Hits (Quality)
- 1982 Smart Ass (Line)
- 1983 Never Kick a Sleeping Dog (Riva; Line) produced by John Mellencamp
- 1985 Legendary Full Moon Concert (Line)
- 1986 In the China Shop (Line)
- 1988 Red Blood, White Mink (Line)
- 1990 The Beautiful Toulang Sunset (Line)
- 1992 La Gash (Line)
- 1992 Live at the Logo Hamburg (Line)
- 1994 Rite of Passage (with Engerling) (Line)
- 1999 Monkey Island (Line)
- 2003 The Old Man Springs a Boner (with Engerling) (Buschfunk)
- 2004 A Dark Caucasian Blue (with Engerling) (Buschfunk)
- 2006 The Acquitted Idiot (with Engerling) (Buschfunk)
- 2008 You Deserve My Art (with Engerling) (Buschfunk)
- 2009 Air Harmonie (Live 2008) (with Engerling) (Buschfunk)
- 2009 Detroit Ain't Dead Yet (Freeworld)
- 2012 The Promise (Michigan Broadcasting Corporation) reissue of Detroit Ain't Dead Yet
- 2013 It's Killing Me (Live 2012) (with Engerling) (Buschfunk)
- 2017 Stick This in Your Ears (Buschfunk)
- 2018 Christmas (Take a Ride) (Goldenlane/Cleopatra)
- 2019 Detroit Breakout! (Goldenlane/Cleopatra)
- 2019 The Blind Squirrel Finds a Nut (Buschfunk)
- 2023 Georgia Drift (Buschfunk)
- 2024 The Roof Is on Fire [live] (Ruf Records) 2-CD
- 2025 With Love (Ruf Records)
