= Journey to the Center of the Mind (song) =

Single by the Amboy Dukes

from the album Journey to the Center of the Mind
- B-side: "Mississippi Murderer"
- Released: June 1968
- Recorded: 1967
- Genre: Psychedelic rock; garage rock; hard rock; acid rock
- Length: 3:11
- Label: Mainstream
- Songwriters: Ted Nugent; Steve Farmer
- Producer: Bob Shad

The Amboy Dukes singles chronology
"Baby, Please Don't Go" (1968)	"Journey to the Center of the Mind" (1968)	"You Talk Sunshine, I Breathe Fire" (1968)

"Journey to the Center of the Mind" is the title track for the second studio album by Detroit rock band the Amboy Dukes. The song was released as a single in June 1968 with the lead album track “Mississippi Murder“ as its B-side. The A-Side was the bands only top 40 hit, reaching No.16 on the US Billboard Hot 100, No. 20 on the US Cash Box Top 100 and No.19 in Canada.

== Original recording ==
"Journey to the Center of the Mind" featured a psychedelic rock, garage rock, hard rock and acid rock sound. It features lyrics written by the Dukes' second guitarist Steve Farmer, and melody written by Ted Nugent. The song was recorded with a higher budget than their past work. During the recording there was considerable tension amongst the band members, and a few of them quit after the album was released, in the summer of 1968. Nugent would often create an uneasy environment for the other band members when he didn’t receive enough attention.

== Other versions ==
The song was covered by Slade (as "Ambrose Slade") in 1969 on the album Beginnings, by the Ramones in 1994 on Acid Eaters and by Sun City Girls in 2001 on Libyan Dream. It was included in the compilation album Nuggets: Original Artyfacts from the First Psychedelic Era, 1965–1968, on the 1998 CD reissue as a bonus track.

Ted Nugent remade the song on his 2007 album Love Grenade.

The lyrics are generally thought to be referring to drug use.

== In popular culture ==
In 2001, the song was featured in "The Room", an episode of the first season of Six Feet Under.
