= Piggy D. =

American musician (born 1975)

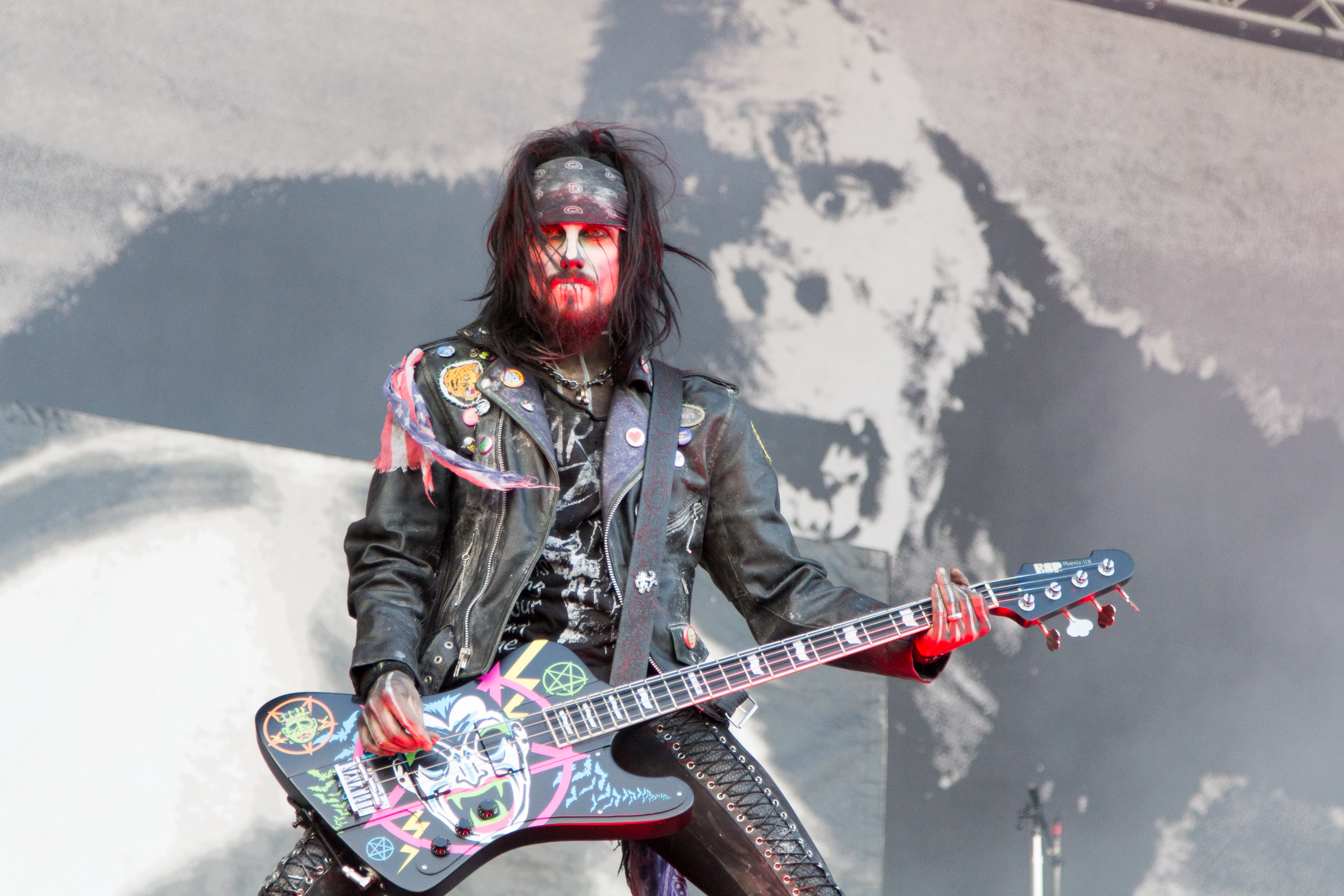
- Piggy D. performing with Rob Zombie 2014 at the Nova Rock Festival

Background information
- Born: Matthew Montgomery; November 16, 1975 (age 50); Houston, Texas, U.S.
- Genres: Heavy metal, hard rock, groove metal, Industrial metal, pop punk, horror punk
- Occupations: Musician, songwriter
- Instruments: Vocals, bass, guitar
- Years active: 1991–present
- Label: Black Victory
- Member of: Marilyn Manson
- Formerly of: Rob Zombie, Amen, Wednesday 13, Alice Cooper
- Spouse: Gabriela Montgomery m.2011-present

Matthew Montgomery (born November 16, 1975), also known as Piggy D., is an American musician. He is the guitarist for Marilyn Manson, and is the former bassist for Rob Zombie and former guitarist for Wednesday 13.

== Career history ==
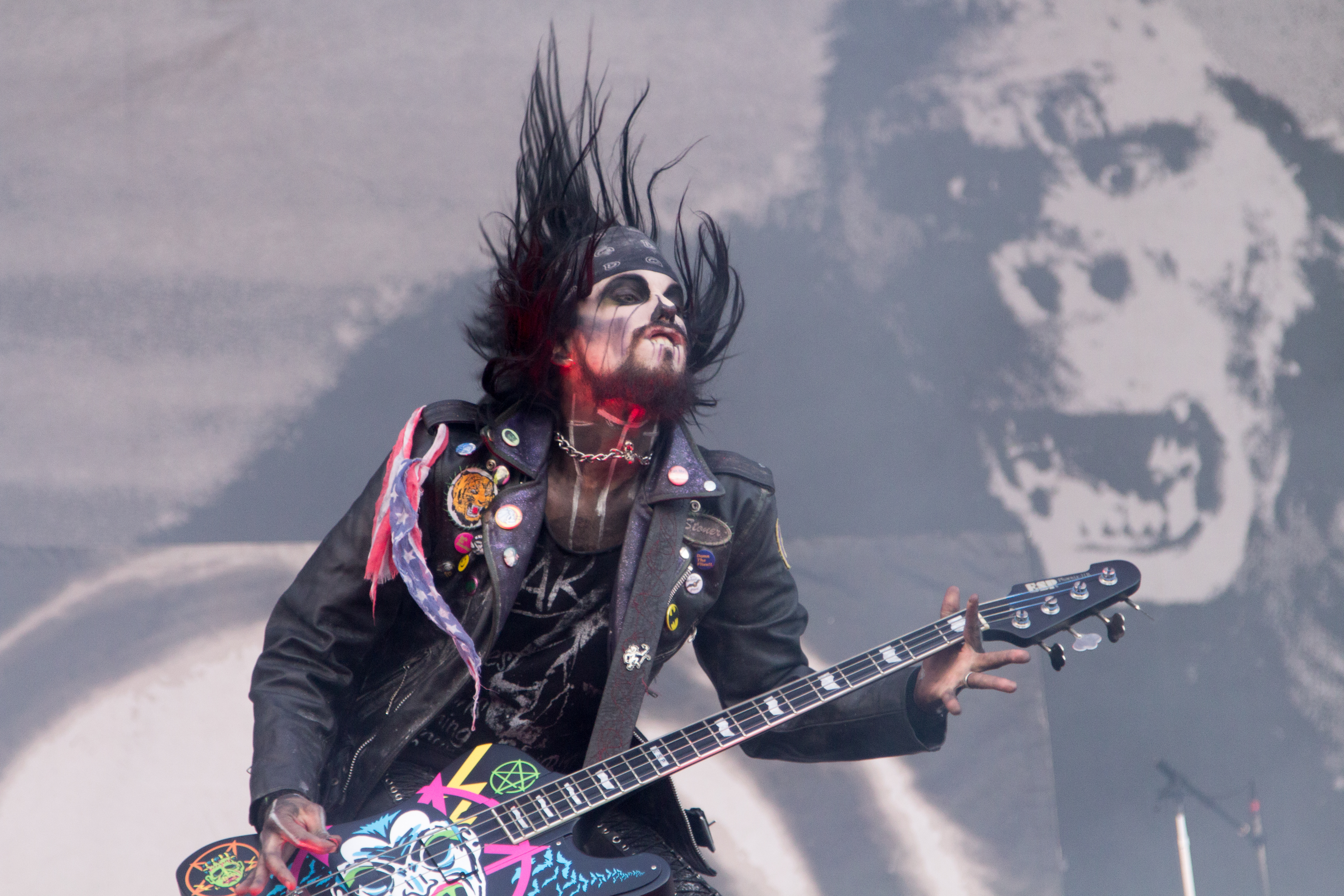
Piggy D. at Nova Rock 2014

In 2003, Piggy D. Joined American punk band Amen on rhythm guitar. Here, he is credited on 2004's Death Before Musick. His stint with Amen ended in 2004 when, coinciding with Amen's hiatus, he joined Wednesday 13 on guitar, contributing backing vocals to his first solo album Transylvania: 90210.

He first took over bass duties with Rob Zombie from Blasko, playing "American Witch" live on the Late Show with David Letterman right before picking up the second leg of the Educated Horses tour in mid 2006. Until 2024, he maintained a successful solo career while playing with Zombie.

Mr. Piggy co-directed a short 10-minute promo video entitled Along Came a Spider: the Movie for Alice Cooper's album which was released on the Cooper's official YouTube-page on October 2, 2008. The movie featured three songs from the album: "Vengeance is Mine," "(In Touch with Your) Feminine Side", and "Killed by Love." The video stars Alice Cooper, Slash, Roxxi Dott, Howie Pyro, and Dave Pino. Piggy D. also contributed all the graphic design for the album including the album cover and multiple teaser posters. Piggy D has also contributed album artwork for John 5's solo albums. His work features on Remixploitation (2009), Requiem (2008) and The Devil Knows My Name (2007). Piggy D also co-designed the art for the newest Lita Ford album Wicked Wonderland.

In 2009, Piggy co-wrote and produced the first ever Alice Cooper Halloween song, "Keepin' Halloween Alive." The single was released digitally on iTunes, and a limited edition CD. A glow in the dark 7" record has also been released.

February 2010 saw the release of the first studio album with Zombie that featured Piggy. The song "The Man Who Laughs" was co-written by Piggy.

In 2011, Piggy co-wrote with David Spreng, Bob Ezrin and Alice Cooper for the long waited sequel Welcome 2 My Nightmare. The track "Last Man On Earth" is featured on the album.

Piggy and vocalist Shannon Gallant began working together again after a 5-year hiatus, and began work a new recording project called The Haxans. The duo have released two singles "Cold Blood" and "Black Cat Bone."

In 2011, Piggy was invited to co-write and co-produce the debut album for The Doom Party. A release date has not been set.

In 2013, Piggy contributed to the song writing for the new Rob Zombie album Venomous Rat Regeneration Vendor with the song "Lucifer Rising". Piggy uses ESP basses.

In 2016, Piggy announced that he was collaborating with Ash Costello from New Years Day on a new project called The Haxans. The first single "Chains" was released on June 6, 2016.

In January 2024, Piggy D announced he was leaving Rob Zombie's band after 18 years. In August 2024, he started playing with Marilyn Manson.

== Discography ==
=== With Amen ===
- 2004: Death Before Musick

=== With Wednesday 13 ===
- 2005: Transylvania 90210: Songs of Death, Dying, and the Dead

=== With John 5 ===
- 2007: The Devil Knows My Name

=== With Rob Zombie ===
- 2007: Zombie Live
- 2008: Punisher: War Zone Soundtrack
- 2010: Hellbilly Deluxe 2: Noble Jackals, Penny Dreadfuls and the Systematic Dehumanization of Cool
- 2013: Venomous Rat Regeneration Vendor
- 2015: Spookshow International Live
- 2016: The Electric Warlock Acid Witch Satanic Orgy Celebration Dispenser
- 2021: The Lunar Injection Kool Aid Eclipse Conspiracy

=== With Alice Cooper ===
- 2009: "Keepin' Halloween Alive" - Single
- 2011: "Last Man On Earth" - album track Co-songwriter for "Welcome 2 My Nightmare"

=== Solo ===
- 2007: The Evacuation Plan
- 2010: "Can't Blame You" - Single
- 2011: "God Save The Queen Bee" - Single
- 2011: "Locust Dance" - Single
- 2011: "1975" - Single
- 2012: Repeat Offender - The Singles and Remix Collection

=== The Haxans ===
- 2012: "Cold Blood" - Single
- 2012: "Black Cat Bone" - Single
- 2016: "Chains" - Single
- 2016: Hax-o-ween Volume 1 - EP
- 2017: Three Hits from Hell - EP
- 2017: "Lights Out" - Single
- 2017: Party Monsters
- 2019: "Pet Sematary" - Single
- 2019: "Godzilla" - Single
- 2021: "Scary Monsters (and Super Creeps)" - Single
- 2022: "All the Roses" - Single
- 2023: The Dead and Restless
- 2023: "Cuz It's Halloween" - Single
- 2023: "Everyday is Halloween" - Single
- 2023: "Ways to Be Wicked" - Single
- 2023: "Witchy Woman" - Single

=== The Doom Party ===
- 2013 "The Last Party" - Single (co-writer/co-producer)

=== With Peter Criss ===
- Peter Criss (2025) (bass on "Cheaper to Keep Her")
