= Careful with That Axe =

Studio album by John 5
- Released: August 12, 2014
- Studio: The Doghouse Studio, Los Angeles
- Genre: Instrumental rock, country
- Length: 31:31
- Label: 60 Cycle Hum
- Producer: John 5, Rodger Carter

John 5 chronology
God Told Me To (2012)	Careful with That Axe (2014)	Season of the Witch (2017)

Singles from Careful with That Axe
- 1. "This Is My Rifle" Released: June 17, 2014

Careful with That Axe is the seventh solo album by American guitarist John 5. It was released on August 12, 2014, and debuted at number 50 on the Billboard Heatseekers Chart. The album's first and only single, "This Is My Rifle", was released two months prior on June 17, 2014.

== Background and recording ==
Work on the album took place in between his work as a touring guitarist for Rob Zombie. Recording took place in "The Doghouse Studios" in Los Angeles. With it being his seventh instrumental studio album, John 5 desired to mix his process up from the past. Historically, he had recorded all guitar and bass guitar parts himself, and hired a studio drummer to "Keep the beat and stay out of [his] way". For Careful with That Axe, he recruited a dedicated bassist, Matt Bissonette, to play all bass parts, and had a co-producer Rodger Carter play all drum tracks, with both players being more interactive in the process. Both were experienced studio musicians, with Bissonette having previously recorded with Elton John and David Lee Roth, and Carter having previously recorded with Lita Ford and Gene Simmons.

== Composition and themes ==
John 5 described the album as having "a real live band sound" that covers a broad spectrum of different music genre. The track "This Is My Rifle" is a tribute to Al Di Meola, while "El Cucuy" is a tribute to Spanish flamenco guitar music. "Jerry's Breakdown" and "Jiffy Jam" are both cover songs of Jerry Reed, a musician John 5 was familiar with due to his father listening to his albums as a child.

The album's title pays homage to Pink Floyd's 1968 psychedelic track "Careful with That Axe, Eugene", while also making a pun on the slang term "axe", meaning a guitar. Both the album's title and many of its individual song titles are references to axe murders. "This Is My Rifle" is a reference to Stanley Kubrick and Full Metal Jacket, "Flight of the Vulcan Valley" is a reference to Flight of the Bumble Bee. "El Cucuy" is Spanish for the "bogeyman", while "Portrait of Sidney Sloan", "Villisca", and "The Dream Slayer" all refer to specific real-life murders.

== Promotion and release ==
The album's first single, "This is My Rifle", was released on June 17, 2014, two months prior to the album's release. The album released on August 12, 2014, through record label 60 Cycle Hum. The album's cover art features photography from Ray Gutierrez of StrangeBeautifulArt, who previously done the image's for John 5's earlier album The Art of Malice. The album debuted at no. 50 on the Billboard Heatseekers Chart.

== Track listing ==
No.	Title	Length
1.	"We Need to Have a Talk with John"	1:20
2.	"This Is My Rifle"	4:00
3.	"Flight of the Vulcan Kelly"	2:18
4.	"Jerry's Breakdown"	2:36
5.	"Six Hundred and Sixty Six Pickers in Hell"	3:18
6.	"Portrait of Sydney Sloan"	3:33
7.	"Jiffy Jam"	2:58
8.	"Vilisca"	3:12
9.	"El Cucuy"	3:26
10.	"The Dream Slayer"	4:13
Total length:		31:31

== Personnel ==
- John 5 – guitars, production
- Matt Bissonette – bass
- Rodger Carter – drums, production
