= Behind the Player: John 5 =

Behind The Player: John 5

Video by John 5
- Released: November 1, 2008
- Length: 72:00
- Label: IMV
- Director: Leon Melas
- Producers: Ken Mayer & Sean E DeMott

Behind The Player: John 5 is an Interactive Music Video featuring Rob Zombie guitarist John 5. Released on November 1, 2008, by IMV, the DVD features John 5 giving in-depth guitar lessons for how to play "Let It All Bleed Out" and "The Lords of Salem" by Rob Zombie and an intimate behind-the scenes look at his life as a professional musician, including rare photos and video. The DVD also includes John 5 playing "The Lords of Salem" with Rob Zombie drummer Tommy Clufetos.
