= God Told Me To (disambiguation) =

God Told Me To is a 1976 film.

God Told Me To may also refer to:

- God Told Me To (album), an album by John 5
- "God Told Me To" (song), a single by Paul Kelly
