= Remixploitation =

Remix album by John 5
- Released: February 14, 2009
- Genre: Alternative metal; instrumental metal
- Label: 60 Cycle Hum

John 5 chronology
Requiem (2008)	Remixploitation (2009)	The Art of Malice (2010)

Remixploitation is the first remix album from guitarist John 5 (ex-Marilyn Manson/Rob Zombie) released on February 14, 2009.

== Track listing ==
No.	Title	Length
1.	"Dorsia"	4:02
2.	"Monsters and Gods"	4:10
3.	"Say Goodnight to Your Soul"	3:37
4.	"Sin"	3:27
5.	"Eat It Up"	4:06
6.	"Unbelievers"	3:55
7.	"Shoot the Dog"	3:03
8.	"2 Bullets"	3:19
9.	"Plastic"	3:37
10.	"How Do You Like It"	4:36

== Credits ==
- John 5 – guitars, bass, banjo
- Tommy Clufetos – drums
- Jeff Mc Donogh – remixed tracks 1, 4
- Bob Marlette – remixed tracks 2, 5, 7, 9
- Chris Baseford – remixed tracks 3, 6
- Sid Riggs – remixed tracks 8, 10
- Neil Zlozower – cover photo
- Piggy D – graphic design
- Gabrielle Geiselman – additional photos
- Mark Friedman – management
- VQPR Nancy Sayle – publicity
