= List of instrumental bands =

== # ==
- 2Cellos
- The 440 Alliance
- 65daysofstatic
- 808 State

== A ==
- Acoustic Alchemy
- Adebisi Shank
- Alamaailman Vasarat
- Alpha Male Tea Party
- And So I Watch You From Afar
- Andy James
- Angel Vivaldi
- Animals as Leaders
- Apocalyptica
- Apollo 100
- Arch Echo
- The Aristocrats
- Art of Noise
- The Atlantics
- Audiomachine
- Austin TV

== B ==
- The Bakerton Group
- Because of Ghosts
- Behold... The Arctopus
- The Bel-Airs
- Bell Orchestre
- Billy Mahonie
- The Black Mages
- Blotted Science
- Boards of Canada
- Bond
- Bongripper
- Bohren & der Club of Gore
- Booker T. & the MG's
- Bozzio Levin Stevens
- Break of Reality
- Buckethead
- Budos Band

== C ==
- CAB
- The Cancer Conspiracy
- Casiopea
- Caspian
- The Champs
- The Chantays
- Chon
- Chromelodeon
- Codes in the Clouds
- The Comet Is Coming
- Conquering Dystopia
- Cougar
- Crime in Choir

== D ==
- Davie Allan & the Arrows
- Delay Tactics
- Delvon Lamarr Organ Trio
- Depapepe
- Dirty Three
- Disen Gage
- Djam Karet
- Do Make Say Think
- Don Caballero
- Dub Trio
- Dysrhythmia

== E ==
- E.S. Posthumus
- Earth
- Earthless
- El Ten Eleven
- Electro Quarterstaff
- Errors
- Explosions in the Sky

== F ==
- The Fearless Flyers
- Finch
- The Fireballs
- Flying Lotus
- Fourplay
- Friends of Dean Martinez
- From Monument to Masses
- The Fucking Champs
- Füxa

== G ==
- Ghosts and Vodka
- Ghost-Note
- Gifts From Enola
- The Glitch Mob
- Goblin
- God is an Astronaut
- Godspeed You! Black Emperor
- Gone
- Gontiti
- Grails

== H ==
- Haiku Salut
- The Headhunters
- Hella

== I ==
- If These Trees Could Talk
- Immediate Music
- Intervals
- Intronaut
- Isotope 217

== J ==
- Jakob
- Peter Jay and the Jaywalkers
- John5
- Joy Wants Eternity
- The Jumping Jewels

== K ==
- Karma to Burn
- Khruangbin
- Kinski
- Kitaro
- Kostarev Group
- Kutumba

== L ==
- Labradford
- Laika & the Cosmonauts
- Lanterna
- Liquid Tension Experiment
- The Lively Ones
- Long Distance Calling
- Los Angeles League of Musicians
- Lymbyc Systym

== M ==
- Maserati
- Maybeshewill
- The Mercury Program
- The Mermen
- Metavari
- Midnight Syndicate
- Mindflayer
- Minibosses
- Mogwai
- Monkey3
- Mono
- Moonlit Sailor

== N ==
- Nox Arcana

== O ==
- The Octopus Project
- Odyssey
- Orbital
- The Outlaws
- OXES
- Ozric Tentacles

== P ==
- Panzerballett
- Pele
- Pelican
- Pell Mell
- Penguin Cafe
- Penguin Cafe Orchestra
- The Piano Guys
- Piglet
- Planet X
- Plini
- Pnuma Trio
- Polyphia
- Port Blue
- Powerglove
- Present
- Public Service Broadcasting

== R ==
- Rachel's
- Rain
- Ratatat
- Red Sparowes
- The Redneck Manifesto
- The Roots of Orchis
- Rovo
- Russian Circles

== S ==
- Saxon Shore
- Scale the Summit
- Secret Chiefs 3
- Serpent Throne
- The Shadows
- Shadowy Men on a Shadowy Planet
- Shalabi Effect
- Simon Phillips' Protocol
- The Six Parts Seven
- Snarky Puppy
- Skeletonbreath
- Sky
- Sleeping People
- Solaris
- Sons of Alpha Centauri
- Sound Tribe Sector 9
- The Spotnicks
- Spyro Gyra
- Stars of the Lid
- Steve Morse Band
- Stinking Lizaveta
- stOrk
- Los Straitjackets
- Strawberry Girls
- The String-A-Longs
- SubArachnoid Space
- The Surf Coasters
- The Surfaris

== T ==
- Talkdemonic
- Tangerine Dream
- Tarentel
- This Patch of Sky
- This Will Destroy You
- Three Trapped Tigers
- Toe
- Toiling Midgets
- Tommy & The Tom Toms
- Tom's Story
- The Tornados
- Tortoise
- Trans-Siberian Orchestra
- Tribal Tech
- Tristeza
- Two Steps From Hell

== U ==
- Univers Zero
- Unwed Sailor

== V ==
- Vangelis
- The Ventures
- Vision Eternel
- Vitamin String Quartet

== W ==
- We Be the Echo
- Weather Report
- Windsor Airlift
- Wizardzz

== X ==
- X-Ray Dog

== Y ==
- Yawning Man
- Yndi Halda
- Yowie

== Z ==
- Zombi
