= Let It All Bleed Out =

Promotional single by Rob Zombie

from the album Educated Horses
- Released: 2006
- Recorded: 2006 at Chop Shop Hollywood, CA
- Genre: Heavy metal, industrial metal
- Length: 4:09
- Label: Geffen
- Songwriters: Rob Zombie; Scott Humphrey
- Producers: Rob Zombie; Scott Humphrey

Rob Zombie singles chronology
"American Witch" (2006)	"Let It All Bleed Out" (2006)	"War Zone" (2008)

"Let It All Bleed Out" is the third and final promotional single from Rob Zombie's third solo album Educated Horses. The song is one of the heavier tracks on the album.

It was used by the game developers to be included in the soundtrack for the video game Scarface: The World is Yours. Portions of the song appeared in the "Best Movie" montage at 2006 MTV Movie Awards where it was used to highlight nominee Sin City.

When performed live by Zombie the song is accompanied by film footage of the Manson Family on the video screens.

== Personnel ==
=== Rob Zombie ===
- Rob Zombie - lead vocals
- John 5 - guitar, backing vocals
- Blasko - bass, backing vocals
- Tommy Clufetos - drums, backing vocals

=== Production ===
- Tom Baker - mastering
- Chris Baseford - engineering
- Scott Humphrey - production
- Will Thompson - assistant engineering
- Rob Zombie - production, lyricist, art direction

== Chart positions ==
Chart	Peak Position
Billboard Hot Mainstream Rock Tracks	29
