= Girl Scout Cookies (disambiguation) =

Girl Scout Cookies are cookies sold by Girl Scouts to raise funds to support Girl Scout councils and individual troops.

Girl Scout Cookies may also refer to:

- Girl Scout Cookies (cannabis strain)
- "Girl Scout Cookies", a song by Ted Nugent from Love Grenade
- "Girl Scout Cookies", a single by Blaze Foley

== See also ==
- Girl Guide Cookies, cookies sold to rise funds by Girl Guides of Canada
