= The Devil Knows My Name =

Studio album by John 5
- Released: April 3, 2007
- Genre: Instrumental rock; hard rock; heavy metal
- Length: 53:32
- Label: 60 Cycle Hum

John 5 chronology
Songs for Sanity (2005)	The Devil Knows My Name (2007)	Requiem (2008)

Singles from The Devil Knows My Name
- 1. "Welcome to the Jungle" Released: 2006

Professional ratings
Review scores
Source	Rating
Metal Hammer	3/10 stars

The Devil Knows My Name is the third solo studio album by American heavy metal guitarist John 5. It was released on April 3, 2007, by 60 Cycle Hum.

== Guest appearances ==
Several artists including Joe Satriani, Eric Johnson, Jim Root (Slipknot, ex-Stone Sour), Tommy Clufetos (ex-Alice Cooper, ex-Rob Zombie, Ozzy Osbourne), Piggy D (Rob Zombie), and Matt Bissonette (David Lee Roth) made guest appearances on the album. Zakk Wylde (Black Label Society, Ozzy Osbourne) was reported to have an appearance on the album, but it was canceled due to scheduling problems.

== Track listing ==
No.	Title	Length
1.	"First Victim"	1:04
2.	"The Werewolf of Westeria" (feat. Joe Satriani)	8:39
3.	"27 Needles"	6:55
4.	"Bella Kiss"	1:30
5.	"Black Widow of La Porte" (feat. Jim Root)	7:25
6.	"Welcome to the Jungle" (Guns N' Roses cover)	4:28
7.	"Harold Rollings Hymn"	0:53
8.	"Dead Art in Plainfield"	8:01
9.	"Young Thing" (Chet Atkins cover)	3:04
10.	"The Washing Away of Wrong" (feat. Eric Johnson)	8:43
11.	"July 31st (The Last Stand)"	4:10

- "The Werewolf of Westeria" was the nickname used for the serial killer and blood maniac Albert Fish.
- "Black Widow of La Porte" is a reference to female serial killer Belle Gunness of La Porte, Indiana.
- "Harold Rollings Hymn" is an edited version of a song Danny Rolling, a convicted serial killer, sang before he was executed.
- "Dead Art in Plainfield" references serial killer Ed Gein, who worked in the area of Plainfield, Wisconsin.
- "July 31st (The Last Stand)" is a reference to the last victim of David Berkowitz, who was killed on the 31 July.
- "27 Needles" is also a reference to Albert Fish. In an infamous x-ray, it was revealed that the serial killer had 27 needles shoved into his pelvis.

== Personnel ==
- John 5 – guitars, bass, banjo, production
- Piggy D – graphic design, photography
- Matt Bissonette – bass
- Sid Riggs – drums, production, engineering, mixing, programming
- Tommy Clufetos – drums
- Undercurrent Studios – Mastering
- Gabrielle Geiselman – photography
- VQPR/Nancy Sayle – marketing album
