= American Witch =

Promotional single by Rob Zombie

from the album Educated Horses
- Released: 2006
- Recorded: 2006 at Chop Shop Hollywood, CA
- Genre: Heavy metal, shock rock
- Length: 3:47
- Label: Geffen
- Songwriters: Rob Zombie; John 5 Scott Humphrey
- Producers: Rob Zombie; Scott Humphrey

Rob Zombie singles chronology
"Foxy Foxy" (2006)	"American Witch" (2006)	"Let It All Bleed Out" (2006)

"American Witch" is the second promotional single off Rob Zombie's third solo album Educated Horses. The song is about the "witch" massacre of the Salem Witchcraft trials in 1692.

The music video of the song features several live performances of the song filmed at Corpus Christi, Denver, Salt Lake City and Mesa. There is also an animated version created by David Hartman. Both of these videos can be found on the bonus DVD included with The Best of Rob Zombie.

It has been featured as part of the soundtrack to EA Sports Big's 2006 football game, NFL Street 3.

== Personnel ==
=== Rob Zombie ===
- Rob Zombie - lead vocals
- John 5 - guitar, backing vocals
- Blasko - bass, backing vocals
- Tommy Clufetos - drums, backing vocals

=== Production ===
- Tom Baker - mastering
- Chris Baseford - engineering
- Scott Humphrey - production
- Will Thompson - assistant engineering
- Rob Zombie - production, lyrics, art direction

== Chart positions ==
Singles - Billboard (North America)

Year	Single	Chart	Position
2006	"American Witch"	Mainstream Rock Tracks	12
2006	"American Witch"	Modern Rock Tracks	32
