= The Lords of Salem =

The Lords of Salem may refer to:

- "The Lords of Salem" (song), a 2006 song by Rob Zombie
- The Lords of Salem (film), a 2013 film, directed by Rob Zombie
