= Songs for Sanity =

Studio album by John 5
- Released: September 13, 2005
- Genre: Instrumental rock; progressive metal; blues rock
- Length: 42:59
- Label: Shrapnel
- Producer: Sid Riggs; Kevin Savigar

John 5 chronology
Vertigo (2004)	Songs for Sanity (2005)	The Devil Knows My Name (2007)

Songs for Sanity is the second solo studio album by American guitarist John 5. The album was released on September 13, 2005, through Shrapnel Records. It features guest appearances from Albert Lee and Steve Vai.

== Track listing ==
No.	Title	Length
1.	"Damaged"	3:04
2.	"Soul of a Robot"	3:34
3.	"Gein with Envy"	2:07
4.	"Sin"	4:08
5.	"Behind the Nut Love"	1:43
6.	"Blues Balls"	3:28
7.	"Fiddler's"	3:12
8.	"Gods and Monsters"	4:10
9.	"2 Die 4"	4:06
10.	"Death Valley"	3:57
11.	"Perineum"	5:07
12.	"Dénouement"	4:17

== Credits ==
- John 5 – guitar, banjo, bass guitar (except on "Fiddler's"), associate producer album
- Steve Vai – guitar on second half of each of the main two solos on "Perineum"
- Albert Lee – guitar on the first solo on "Death Valley"
- Larry Klein – bass guitar on "Fiddler's"
- Josh Jones – bass guitar on "Fiddler's"
- Rodger Carter – drums on tracks 3, 6, 8, 9, 10, and 12
- Aaron Rossi – drums on tracks 1, 2, 4, 7, and 11
- Sid Riggs – keyboards (except on tracks 6, 8, and 9), producer, engineer, programming, mixing album
- Kevin Savigar – keyboards on tracks 6, 8, and 9, producer, additional engineering
- Mike Varney – executive producer
- Shaun Evans – mixing assistant engineer
- Maryanne Bilham – photography
- Dave Stepens – graphic design, layout
- Tim Gennert – mastering album
