= Tommy Clufetos =

American drummer

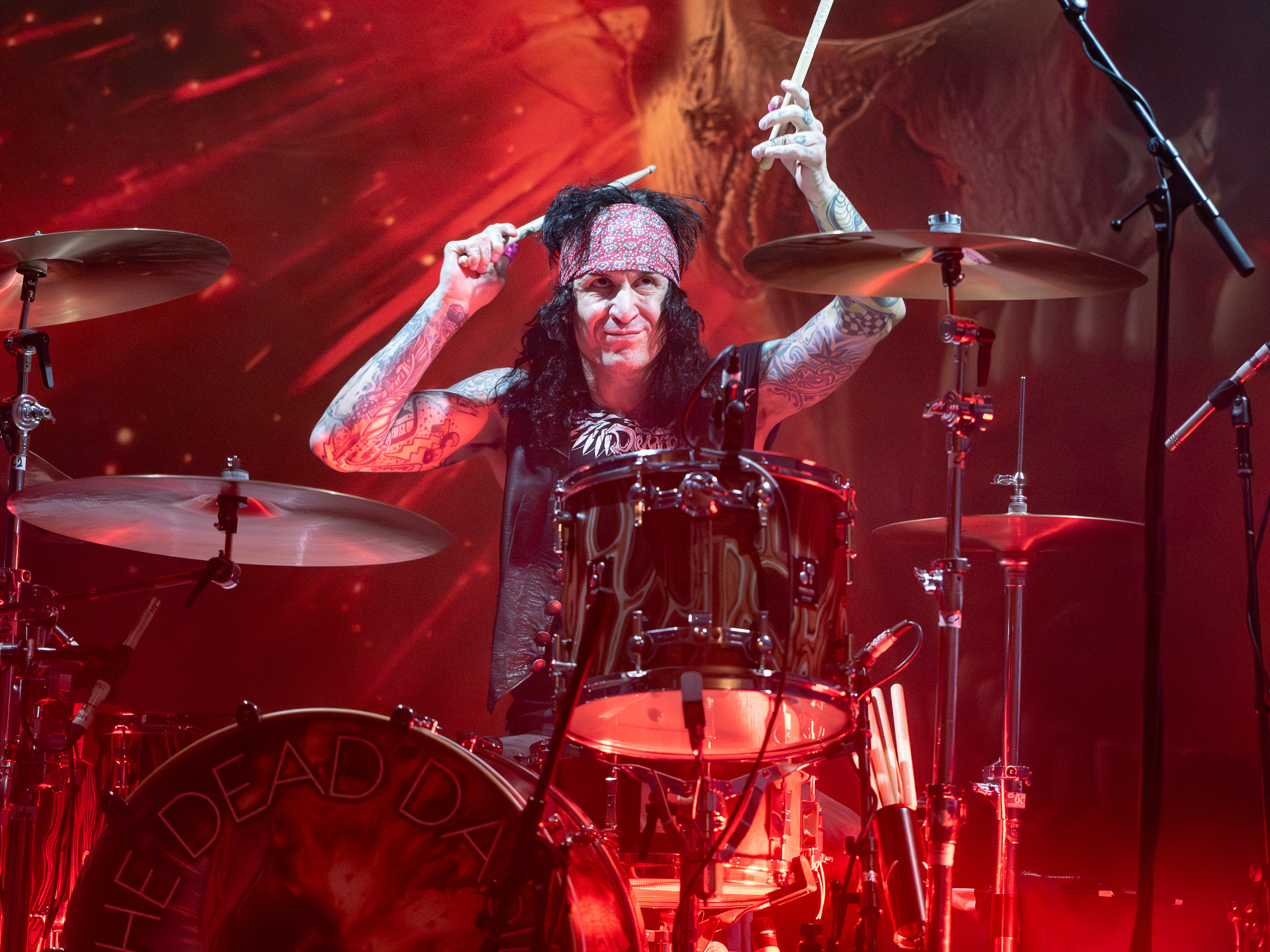
- Clufetos performing with The Dead Daisies in 2025

Background information
- Born: December 30, 1979 (age 46); Detroit, Michigan, U.S.
- Genres: Heavy metal, alternative metal, instrumental rock, hard rock
- Occupation: Drummer
- Label: Epic
- Member of: L.A. Rats, The Dead Daisies
- Formerly of: Ozzy Osbourne, Rob Zombie

Tommy Clufetos (born December 30, 1979) is an American session drummer most noted for his work with Black Sabbath during their Black Sabbath Reunion Tour, which highlighted their new album 13. He also toured with them on their final tour. Clufetos was also the drummer for vocalist Ozzy Osbourne as well as the supergroup L.A. Rats.

== Biography ==
Clufetos was born in Detroit, Michigan, to Greek American parents. He attended Rochester Adams High School in Rochester. He began playing drums around the age of six.

== Career ==
Clufetos started playing drums at age seven and went on to join Mitch Ryder and the Detroit Wheels (1999) before joining forces with Ted Nugent (2001–2003). He played on Craveman and Love Grenade. After Ted Nugent, Tommy went on to join Alice Cooper's Band for his 2004 tour. He also performed on Alice Cooper's 2004 release Dirty Diamonds. He went on to join Rob Zombie from 2005 to 2010, and played on Zombie's 2006 album Educated Horses, on Zombie's first live release, 2007's Zombie Live, and on 2010s Hellbilly Deluxe 2.

In March 2010 Clufetos quit Rob Zombie to join Ozzy Osbourne. "I have no problem with [Ozzy], nor with Tommy joining his band," said Zombie. "My beef was the way Tommy did it. If he'd come to me and said he wanted to leave, I'd have said that was fine and wished him all the best. He didn't."

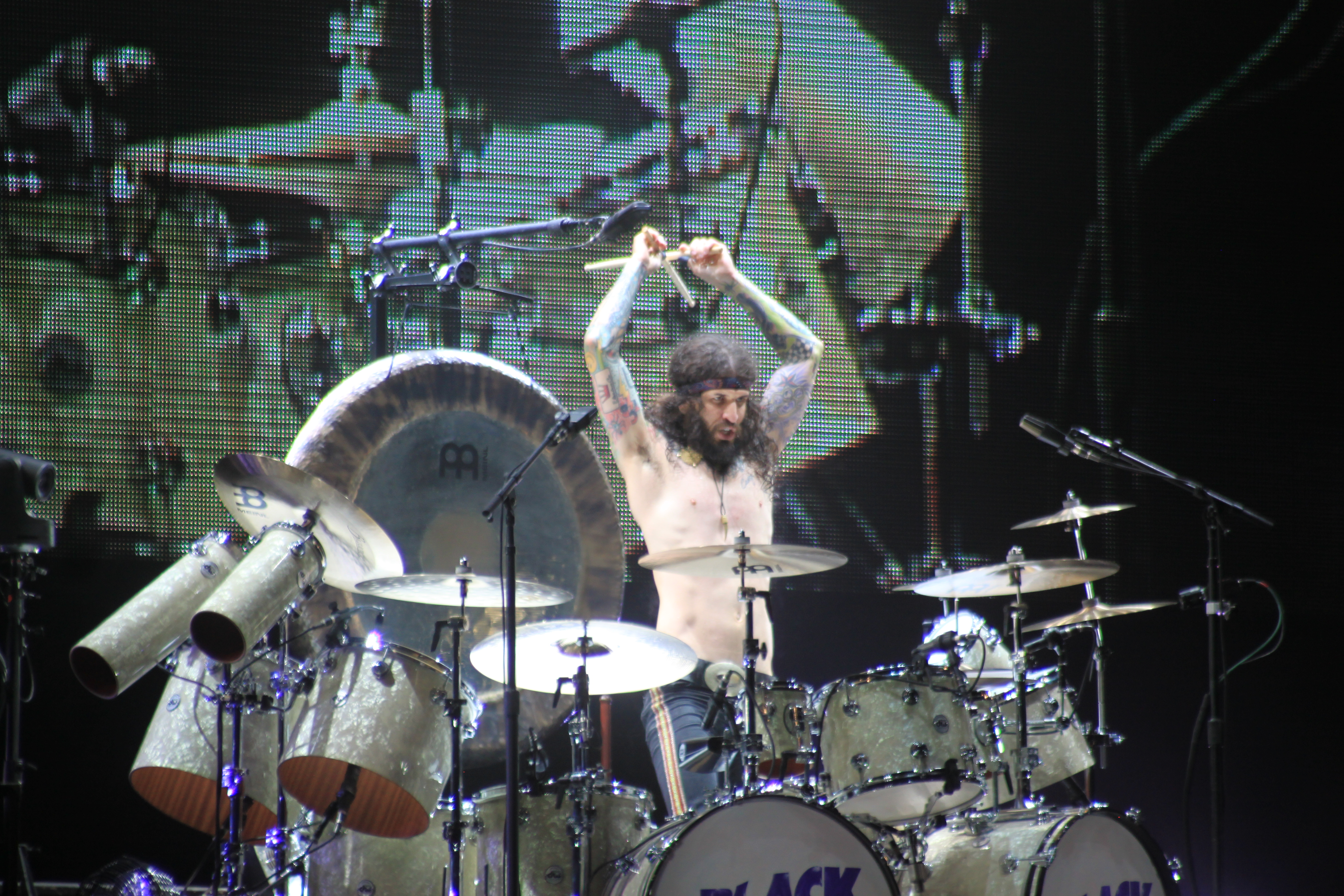
Clufetos performing at Hellfest 2016

In May 2012, Clufetos played with Black Sabbath, filling in for original drummer Bill Ward. However, he did not perform on their album 13, as Brad Wilk ended up behind the kit during the sessions. Osbourne said Clufetos was brought into the album's pre-production before producer Rick Rubin pressured the band to record with another drummer. The singer was dissatisfied with the decision, and only accepted to take part in a tour for the album if Clufetos was present. Clufetos returned to Sabbath in 2013 for their Worldwide Reunion Tour, with their first shows of 2013 in Australia & New Zealand. After Clufetos continued with Sabbath in 2014 with the first show at the Barclays Center in Brooklyn, New York City, and the final show at Hyde Park, London. In 2015 Clufetos played with Ozzy Osbourne including Ozzfest Japan and others. In late 2015, Clufetos began rehearsals with Sabbath for their farewell tour simply titled "The End", starting on January 20, 2016, in Omaha, Nebraska through to a final show on February 4, 2017, at Birmingham England's Genting arena. He is thus featured on Sabbath's DVD The End.

In May 2021, it was announced that Clufetos joined with previous bandmates Rob Zombie and John 5 as well as Nikki Sixx to form a supergroup called L.A. Rats. Their debut track, "I've Been Everywhere", is from the soundtrack to the Liam Neeson film The Ice Road.

On June 16, 2022 Mötley Crüe began a summer tour at Truist Park in Atlanta, Georgia. After the band finished their fifth song, drummer Tommy Lee announced to the crowd that he was playing with broken ribs and was not able to finish the set. Lee announced Clufetos as his replacement for the remainder of the show. Clufetos remained with the tour and partially filled in for Lee until Lee was able to fully return on June 28, 2022 at Bank of America Stadium in Charlotte, North Carolina.

On July 5, 2025, Clufetos reunited with Ozzy Osbourne joining his solo band to perform in what became Osbourne's final show named Back to the Beginning, at the Aston Villa Park in Birmingham, England.

== Equipment ==
Clufetos endorses Sonor drums, Meinl Percussion cymbals, Vic Firth Drumsticks & Remo Drumheads .

== Discography ==
=== Alice Cooper ===
- 2005: Dirty Diamonds

=== B'z ===
- 2017: Dinosaur

=== Ted Nugent ===
- 2002: Craveman
- 2007: Love Grenade

=== Lesley Roy ===
- 2008: Unbeautiful

=== Rob Zombie ===
- 2006: Educated Horses
- 2007: Zombie Live
- 2010: Hellbilly Deluxe 2

=== John 5 ===
- 2007: The Devil Knows My Name
- 2008: Requiem
- 2009: Remixploitation
- 2010: The Art of Malice

=== Whitey Kirst ===
- 2012: All Rise!

=== Black Sabbath ===
- 2013: Live... Gathered in Their Masses
- 2016: The End
- 2017: The End: Live in Birmingham

=== L.A. Rats ===
- 2021: The Ice Road Soundtrack

=== Tommy Clufetos ===
- 2021: Tommy's RockTrip: Beat Up By Rock 'N' Roll

=== DVDs ===
- 1999: Rock n' Roll Greats - In Concert - Mitch Ryder & the Detroit Wheels
- 2001: Full Bluntal Nugity - Ted Nugent
- 2006: "Ozzfest: 10th Anniversary" - Rob Zombie
- 2008: IMV Behind the Player (instructional DVD) - Tommy makes an appearance on John 5's guitar instructional DVD for IMV
- 2008: IMV Behind the Player (instructional DVD) with Tommy Clufetos.
- 2010: IMV Behind the Player (instructional DVD) Tommy makes an appearance on Ace Frehley's instructional DVD on the song "Shock Me"
- 2013: Live... Gathered in Their Masses - Black Sabbath
- 2017: The End: Live in Birmingham - Black Sabbath
