= Tobias Enhus =

Swedish music composer living in the US

- Occupation: Composer

Tobias Enhus is a Swedish music composer living in the US. His work has appeared in films, such as Black Hawk Down. He has also created music for television commercials, including the haunting score (featuring female operatic singing) heard in a 2006 commercial for Mercedes-Benz S-Class vehicles (shown during PBS sponsor-appreciation segments). More recently, Enhus composed the majority of the track to The Matrix: Path of Neo, collaborating with other artists, such as Juno Reactor, Mark Killian, Todd Haberman and Rob Bennett, as well as composing the score for the Spider-Man 3 video game based on the 2007 film of the same name. Enhus has also composed for Machine Head. He also provided a track for Mondo Sex Head, a 2012 remix album by Rob Zombie.
