= Requiem (John 5 album) =

Studio album by John 5
- Released: July 3, 2008
- Recorded: 2008
- Genre: Heavy metal; hard rock; instrumental rock
- Length: 42:57
- Label: 60 Cycle Hum
- Producer: Chris Baseford

John 5 chronology
The Devil Knows My Name (2007)	Requiem (2008)	Remixploitation (2009)

Requiem is the fourth studio album by John 5, released on July 3, 2008. It is essentially an instrumental metal album, but it also has some bluegrass elements. The album is notable for having the majority of its songs named after medieval torture devices.

The first single, "Sounds of Impalement", was released via John 5's official website.

== Reception ==
The album received generally positive reviews, the album received a 3/5 on Sputnik Music and a 10/10 on FPM102, the highest rating the site had ever given to a metal album.

== Track listing ==
No.	Title	Length
1.	"Sounds of Impalement"	4:17
2.	"Heretic's Fork"	3:51
3.	"Noisemaker's Fife"	5:23
4.	"Pity Belt"	1:36
5.	"Cleansing the Soul"	5:40
6.	"The Judas Cradle"	4:24
7.	"Pear of Anquish"	1:01
8.	"The Lead Sprinkler"	5:35
9.	"Scavenger's Daughter"	6:46
10.	"Requiem"	4:27

== Personnel ==
- John 5 – lead guitar, banjo, bass. Also co-producer album
- Tommy Clufetos – drums
- Chris Baseford – producer
