= L.A. Rats =

American heavy metal band (2021)

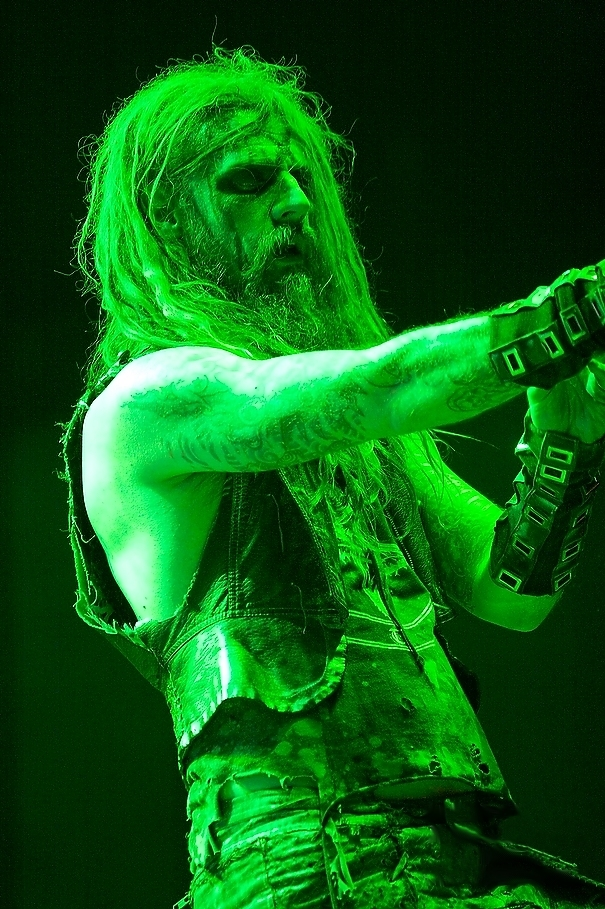
- Frontman Rob Zombie

Background information
- Genres: Heavy metal, avant garde metal, groove metal
- Years active: 2021
- Label: Big Machine
- Members: Rob Zombie; Nikki Sixx; John 5 Tommy Clufetos

L.A. Rats were an American heavy metal supergroup active in 2021.

== History ==
The band was formed in early 2021 at the invitation of record company executive Scott Borchetta, who had been placed in charge of the soundtrack for the then-upcoming action thriller Netflix film The Ice Road. The supergroup includes frontman Rob Zombie, current Mötley Crüe and former Rob Zombie and Marilyn Manson guitarist John 5, Mötley Crüe bassist Nikki Sixx, and Ted Nugent/Black Sabbath drummer Tommy Clufetos. The musicians had worked together before in various capacities. Clufetos has played drums on several of Zombie's and John 5's albums, while John 5 had collaborated with Sixx on the soundtrack to the film The Dirt.

Their first song "I've Been Everywhere", a heavy metal cover of a 1959 country song written by Geoff Mack, which has also been recorded by Hank Snow, Johnny Cash, and Asleep at the Wheel, was used in The Ice Road and appeared on the accompanying soundtrack album. The song reached the Billboard Mainstream Rock chart in July 2021, and an animated music video for the song was also released.

As of late 2021 it is unclear if the supergroup will record any additional music.

== Band members ==
- Rob Zombie – vocals
- Nikki Sixx – bass
- John 5 – guitar
- Tommy Clufetos – drums

== Singles ==
Title	Year	Peak chart positions	Album
Title	Year	US Main.	Album
"I've Been Everywhere"	2021	11	The Ice Road soundtrack
