= Craveman =

Studio album by Ted Nugent
- Released: September 24, 2002
- Recorded: April 2002
- Studio: 40 Oz Sound, Ann Arbor, Michigan
- Genre: Hard rock, heavy metal
- Length: 56:06
- Label: Spitfire
- Producer: Ted Nugent, Drew Peters, Chris Peters

Ted Nugent chronology
Full Bluntal Nugity (2001)	Craveman (2002)	Hunt Music (2004)

Professional ratings
Review scores
Source	Rating
AllMusic	4/5 stars

Craveman is the twelfth studio album by American rock musician Ted Nugent, released on September 24, 2002.

The album continues the trend, started in the mid-1990s, of Nugent returning to the rawer, harder-rocking sound that made him famous in the 1970s. This stands in sharp contrast to the synth-pop of his 1980s work, and the romantic AOR power-ballads of his early 1990s band Damn Yankees. This album also contains some material from an unreleased Damn Yankees album, Bravo.

== Reception ==
Critic Eduardo Rivadavia of AllMusic gave Craveman a positive 4 stars out of a possible 5, declaring it Nugent's "fiercest effort in decades, and certainly his heaviest ever."

== Track listing ==
All songs are written by Ted Nugent, except where noted,

1. "Klstrphnky" – 3:55
2. "Crave" (Blades, Nugent) – 6:19
3. "Rawdogs & Warhogs" – 3:37
4. "Damned If Ya Do" (Blades, Nugent, Shaw) – 4:21
5. "At Home There" (Brendan Lynch, Nugent, Greg Wells) – 3:49
6. "Cum n Gitya Sum-o-This" – 2:37
7. "Change My Sex" – 3:03
8. "I Won’t Go Away" (Damon Johnson, Nugent) – 5:32
9. "Pussywhipped" – 3:00
10. "Goin' Down Hard" (Mike Lutz, Nugent, Alto Reed) – 4:13
11. "Wang Dang Doodle" (Willie Dixon) – 2:58
12. "My Baby Likes My Butter on Her Gritz" (Marco Mendoza, Nugent) – 3:52
13. "Sexpot" – 3:11
14. "Earthtones" [instrumental] (Mendoza, Nugent) – 5:39

== Credits ==
=== Band members ===
- Ted Nugent – guitars, lead vocals, producer
- Marco Mendoza – bass guitar, percussion, backing vocals, lead vocals on "At Home There"
- Tommy Clufetos – drums, percussion, backing vocals

=== Production ===
- Chris Peters – producer
- Drew Peters – producer, engineer
- Ben Began – engineer, mixing
- Joe Lambert – mastering

== Charts ==
Chart (2002)	Peak position
US Independent Albums (Billboard)	20
