= Vertigo (John 5 album) =

Studio album by John 5
- Released: August 31, 2004
- Recorded: 2003–2004
- Genre: Instrumental rock; avant-garde metal
- Length: 42:23
- Label: Shrapnel
- Producer: Kevin Savigar; Billy Sherwood

John 5 chronology
Vertigo (2004)	Songs For Sanity (2005)

Professional ratings
Review scores
Source	Rating
AllMusic	3.5/5 stars
Kerrang!	1/5 stars

Vertigo is the debut solo album by American guitarist John 5, released on August 31, 2004. The album was also partly produced, engineered and mixed by Billy Sherwood, who also plays some lap steel and bass on the album. Other performers include Jay Schellen (drums), Kevin Savigar (co-writer, keys, programming, engineer, producer), "Bourbon" Bob Bartell (bass), Graham Ward (drums).

== Track listing ==
No.	Title	Length
1.	"Needles CA"	3:22
2.	"Feisty Cadavers"	4:12
3.	"Pulling Strings"	3:45
4.	"Sugar Foot Rag"	3:04
5.	"Dead Man's Dream"	3:29
6.	"Sweet Georgia Brown" (Ben Bernie cover)	2:43
7.	"Flatlines, Thin Lines"	3:35
8.	"Liberty"	2:23
9.	"Vertigo"	3:47
10.	"18969 Ventura Blvd"	2:37
11.	"Zugg Island Convict"	3:21
12.	"Salt Creek" (Albert Lee cover)	2:51
13.	"Goodnight"	3:14

== Personnel ==
- John 5 – guitars, bass guitar
- Bob Bartell – bass guitar
- Kevin Savigar – keyboards
- Jay Schellen – drums
- Graham Ward – drums
