= Venomous Rat Regeneration Vendor =

Studio album by Rob Zombie
- Released: April 23, 2013
- Recorded: June 2012
- Genre: Industrial metal; alternative metal; shock rock
- Length: 38:51
- Label: Zodiac Swan; T-Boy; Universal
- Producer: Bob Marlette

Rob Zombie chronology
Mondo Sex Head (2012)	Venomous Rat Regeneration Vendor (2013)	The Electric Warlock Acid Witch Satanic Orgy Celebration Dispenser (2016)

Venomous Rat Regeneration Vendor is the fifth solo studio album by American musician Rob Zombie. The album was released on April 23, 2013, four days after the release of Zombie's film The Lords of Salem. The tracklisting was confirmed on Zombie's Facebook page on February 22. This is the first Rob Zombie album to feature drummer Ginger Fish who, like John 5, was previously a member of the band Marilyn Manson. A music video for the album's first single "Dead City Radio and the New Gods of Supertown" was released April 8, 2013.

For Record Store Day 2013, Zombie released a promotional single for "Dead City Radio and the New Gods of Supertown" (with b-side "Teenage Nosferatu Pussy") on 10 inches colored vinyl printed on a reverse groove, with artwork by Alex Horley. This featured a slightly alternate edit of "Dead City Radio" clocking in at 3:54 instead of 3:28 which included an extended pre-chorus and outro not heard on the full album release. Best Buy stores offered a limited edition featuring a 3D sticker cover with a code for exclusive behind-the-scenes footage on the making of the album.

== Sales and reception ==
Professional ratings
Review scores
Source	Rating
AllMusic	2.5/5 stars
Brave Words & Bloody Knuckles	8.5/10
Metal Hammer	4/5 stars
Orlando Weekly	4/5 stars
Ultimate Guitar	7/10
The Sydney Morning Herald	3/5 stars

The album received generally positive reviews from critics. A mixed review came from AllMusic's Stephen Thomas Erlewine, stating "there seems to be a concept album tying [it] together but it'd require patience to piece together, patience that only fanboys could afford". He also questioned Zombie's decision to cover the Grand Funk Railroad's song "We're an American Band": "Why he decided to cover Grand Funk Railroad is anybody's guess – maybe somebody at the label thought it'd help get him on the radio, but at this point, nobody should be under any illusion that Rob Zombie could expand his audience". A more positive review came from Chuck Armstrong of Loudwire who called it "Arguably his best album since his debut masterpiece", before closing his review with it "will be an album that you listen to from beginning to end, and then you'll want to do it all over again".

Venomous Rat Regeneration Vendor sold 34,000 copies in the United States in its first week of release to land at No. 7 on the Billboard 200 albums chart.

== Track listing ==
All tracks are written by Rob Zombie and John 5, except where noted.

No.	Title	Writer(s)	Length
1.	"Teenage Nosferatu Pussy"		4:34
2.	"Dead City Radio and the New Gods of Supertown"	Zombie, 5, Bob Marlette	3:28
3.	"Revelation Revolution"		3:10
4.	"Theme for the Rat Vendor"		1:02
5.	"Ging Gang Gong De Do Gong De Laga Raga"		3:19
6.	"Rock and Roll (In a Black Hole)"	Zombie, 5, Marlette	4:14
7.	"Behold, the Pretty Filthy Creatures!"		2:55
8.	"White Trash Freaks"		3:12
9.	"We're an American Band" (Grand Funk Railroad cover)	Don Brewer	3:30
10.	"Lucifer Rising"	Zombie, 5, Piggy D.	3:19
11.	"The Girl Who Loved the Monsters"		3:57
12.	"Trade in Your Guns for a Coffin"		2:11
Total length:			38:51

== Personnel ==
- Rob Zombie – lead vocals
- John 5 – guitars, backing vocals
- Piggy D. – bass, backing vocals
- Ginger Fish – drums, percussion
- Bob Marlette – keyboards, production, programming, engineering
- Josh Freese – additional drums
- Kevin Churko – mixing, mastering
- Kane Churko – mastering, assisted mixing
- Zeuss – programming
- Chris Marlette – programming
- Ava Lucia Skurkis – voice actress (Rob Zombie's niece)

== Charts ==
Chart (2013)	Peak position
Australian Albums (ARIA)	36
Austrian Albums (Ö3 Austria)	38
Belgian Albums (Ultratop Flanders)	175
Belgian Albums (Ultratop Wallonia)	200
Canadian Albums (Billboard)	13
Finnish Albums (Suomen virallinen lista)	27
German Albums (Offizielle Top 100)	60
Scottish Albums (Official Charts)	35
Swedish Albums (Sverigetopplistan)	97
Swiss Albums (Schweizer Hitparade)	49
UK Albums (OCC)	33
UK Rock & Metal Albums (Official Charts)	2
US Billboard 200	7
US Top Hard Rock Albums (Billboard)	1
US Top Rock Albums (Billboard)	3
