= Behind the Player: Tommy Clufetos =

Behind The Player: Tommy Clufetos

Video by Tommy Clufetos
- Released: November 1, 2008
- Length: 72:00
- Label: IMV
- Director: Leon Melas
- Producer: Ken Mayer & Sean E DeMott

Behind The Player: Tommy Clufetos is an Interactive Music Video featuring Rob Zombie drummer Tommy Clufetos. Released on November 1, 2008 by IMV, the DVD features Tommy giving in-depth drum lessons for how to play "Lords of Salem"" and "American Witch" by Rob Zombie and an intimate behind-the scenes look at his life as a professional musician, including rare photos and video. The DVD also includes Tommy jamming the two tracks with Rob Zombie bassist Blasko, VideoTab that shows exactly how Tommy plays his parts in the two songs, as well as other bonus material.

IMV donates $.25 from the sale of each Behind the Player DVD to Little Kids Rock, an organization that gets instruments in the hands of underprivileged kids.

== Contents ==
Behind The Player

Tommy talks about his background, influences and gear, including rare photos and video

"Lords of Salem" by Rob Zombie

- Lesson: Tommy gives an in-depth drum lesson for how to play the song
- Jam: Tommy jams the track with Rob Zombie bassist Blasko

"American Witch" by Rob Zombie

- Lesson: Tommy gives an in-depth drum lesson for how to play the song
- Jam: Tommy jams the track with Rob Zombie bassist Blasko

Special features

- Bonus Video Clip
- Little Kids Rock promotional video

== Personnel ==
- Produced By: Ken Mayer & Sean E Demott
- Directed By: Leon Melas
- Executive Producer: Rick Donaleshen
- Director Of Photography: Ken Barrows
- Sound Engineer: John Lousteau
- Edited By: Jeff Morose
- Mixed By: Matt Chidgey & Cedrick Courtois
- Graphics By: Thayer Demay
- Camera Operators: Mike Chateneuf, Brian Silva, Doug Cragoe
- Technical Director: Tyler Bourns
- Gaffer: John Parker
- Assistant Director: Matt Pick
- Lighting And Grip: Mcnulty Nielson
- Artist Hospitality: Sasha Mayer
- Shot At: Studio 606
- Special Guests: John 5 & Blasko
- Cover Photo By: Chad Lee
- Video Courtesy Of: The Chop Shop, John 5, Piggy D, Rob Zombie, Ted Nugent, Christopher Cymbaluk
- Photos Courtesy Of: Neil Zlozower, Chad Lee, The Chop Shop, Will Thompson
