= The Lunar Injection Kool Aid Eclipse Conspiracy =

Studio album by Rob Zombie
- Released: March 12, 2021
- Recorded: 2020
- Studio: Goat Head Studios East
- Genre: Industrial metal; heavy metal
- Length: 41:50
- Label: Nuclear Blast
- Producer: Zeuss

Rob Zombie chronology
The Electric Warlock Acid Witch Satanic Orgy Celebration Dispenser (2016)	The Lunar Injection Kool Aid Eclipse Conspiracy (2021)	The Great Satan (2026)

Singles from The Lunar Injection Kool Aid Eclipse Conspiracy
- 1. "The Triumph of King Freak (A Crypt of Preservation and Superstition)" Released: October 20, 2020; 2. "The Eternal Struggles of the Howling Man" Released: January 29, 2021; 3. "Crow Killer Blues" Released: March 12, 2021

The Lunar Injection Kool Aid Eclipse Conspiracy is the seventh studio album by American heavy metal musician Rob Zombie. The album was released on March 12, 2021, by Nuclear Blast. It received positive reviews upon release. It was Rob Zombie's first album to reach No. 1 at the Billboard's Top Album Sales Chart in the US in the first week of its release. It was the last album to feature long time guitarist John 5 and bassist Piggy D., the former joining Mötley Crüe and the latter joining Marilyn Manson.

== Development ==
Whenever we start making a record, we don't work in a sense where we go into a rehearsal space and jam and come up with riffs — we don't function like that". "When I start, day one of recording, there's no music that exists — we just record as we create. And after all these years, you kind of are just trying to find new things to do. Because there's a certain formula you have, or you could have, that it would take about two seconds to write 'that' type of song. But you always wanna try to figure out new avenues that you can explore. And that's really what it is.
— Zombie describing the new album.

In 2018, Rob Zombie stated in an interview with "Whiplash", the KLOS radio show hosted by Full Metal Jackie, that the music on his upcoming album will be "much more complicated structurally". According to Rob, his goal on his next album has once again been to explore new territory without deviating too much from his tried-and-tested formula.

The original plan was to release the album in 2019. During an interview at January 2019, John 5 described the album on a Talk Toomey podcast as "hooky and musical, and badass. The best Zombie record to date—better than White Zombie anything… He went nuts on this one. I'm telling you, it's the best Zombie record you guys will hear. And we're going to have a big tour. We're going to do videos, and you know, I've been in the band with the guy forever and I just love him". Later in the same year with an interview with Revolver, John 5 said of the new music as "Heavy, very heavy. It's just a heavy Zombie record with great hooks. It's very, very musical, and a hard-hitting Zombie record. I think people are really gonna dig it. I'm a Zombie fan, and if I heard it, I'd be like, 'Oh my God, this is brutal.' I'm really excited about it!".

In the same year, Rob Zombie spoke about his much anticipated seventh album release to NME in 2019 saying that "The record's definitely finished and…I think it's the best record we've ever made. It's a very big, crazy and complex record that I'm really excited to finally be able to release. I just had to get everything with 3 From Hell completely finished before we got into that, but my plan now is to start shooting some big videos for the album around January so that we can release it early next year." Zombie's subsequent plan was to release the new album in February 2020.

Early October 2020, John 5 stated to Meltdown of Detroit's WRIF radio station about the status of Rob Zombie's long-awaited new studio album saying that "You will be seeing something soon," John 5 said. "That's all I say. Very, very, very soon. It's coming very soon… We're excited. I'm more excited than anyone, that's for sure." At the end of the same month, Rob Zombie announced the album's title as "The Lunar Injection Kool Aid Eclipse Conspiracy" and its track listing with a release date at March 12, 2021.

== Commercial performance ==
This is the first studio album of Rob Zombie that reached No. 1 at the Billboard's Top Album Sales Chart with 26,000 copies sold in the U.S. in the week ending March 18. It also was Zombie's fourth No. 1 on Billboard's Top Rock Albums and Hard Rock Albums charts eclipsing his prior No. 5 best set with 1998's Hellbilly Deluxe, 2006's Educated Horses and 2016's The Electric Warlock Acid Witch Satanic Orgy Celebration Dispenser.

== Reception ==
Professional ratings
Aggregate scores
Source	Rating
Metacritic	64/100
Review scores
Source	Rating
AllMusic	4.5/5 stars
Consequence	B+
Kerrang!	3/5 stars
Rolling Stone	1.5/5 stars
Sputnikmusic	2/5 stars

On Metacritic, the album has a rating of 64 out of 100 based on five reviews, indicating generally favourable reviews. Consequence reported that the "instrumentation and lyrics are equal parts memorable and evil. Let's face it, memorable and evil are two traits any fan would want from a Rob Zombie album" awarding the album a score of "B+". AllMusic gave the album 4.5 stars out of 5 writing that "Inscrutably titled and strange as ever, the veteran rock icon sticks close to his established aesthetic: a sexed-up, sci-fi, psychedelic gore-fest packed with ghoulish cult-horror schlock, breakneck riffs, and pummeling delivery." Kerrang! called the album "a familiar ride, but one that's hard to beat", awarding it a 3 out of 5 stars rating and criticising the album's length while praising the singles "The Triumph of King Freak (A Crypt of Preservation and Superstition)" and "The Eternal Struggles of the Howling Man" due to "their turbocharged drive". Rolling Stone said the album "offers the same disco-metal dreck [Zombie has been] been peddling for 30 years," giving it 1.5 out of 5 stars.

== Track listing ==
All tracks are written by Rob Zombie, Chris Harris, and John Lowery

No.	Title	Length
1.	"Expanding the Head of Zed"	0:54
2.	"The Triumph of King Freak (A Crypt of Preservation and Superstition)"	4:07
3.	"The Ballad of Sleazy Rider"	3:03
4.	"Hovering Over the Dull Earth"	0:23
5.	"Shadow of the Cemetery Man"	3:14
6.	"A Brief Static Hum and Then the Radio Blared"	0:43
7.	"18th-Century Cannibals, Excitable Morlocks and a One-Way Ticket on the Ghost Train"	3:27
8.	"The Eternal Struggles of the Howling Man"	4:16
9.	"The Much Talked of Metamorphosis"	2:06
10.	"The Satanic Rites of Blacula"	2:18
11.	"Shower of Stones"	0:27
12.	"Shake Your Ass-Smoke Your Grass"	3:10
13.	"Boom-Boom-Boom"	3:20
14.	"What You Gonna Do with That Gun Mamma?"	0:59
15.	"Get Loose"	3:27
16.	"The Serenity of Witches"	0:56
17.	"Crow Killer Blues"	5:00
Total length:		41:50

== Personnel ==
Credited musicians include:

Rob Zombie

- Rob Zombie – vocals
- John 5 – guitars
- Piggy D. – bass
- Ginger Fish – drums

Additional musicians

- DJ Kron Garr – turntables
- Josh Freese – drums
- Keys Mahoney – keyboards

Production

- Zeuss – producer, engineering, mixing, mastering

== Charts ==
=== Weekly charts ===
Weekly chart performance for The Lunar Injection Kool Aid Eclipse Conspiracy
Chart (2021)	Peak position
Australian Albums (ARIA)	10
Austrian Albums (Ö3 Austria)	23
Belgian Albums (Ultratop Flanders)	98
Belgian Albums (Ultratop Wallonia)	98
Canadian Albums (Billboard)	39
Finnish Albums (Suomen virallinen lista)	22
French Albums (SNEP)	123
German Albums (Offizielle Top 100)	4
Scottish Albums (OCC)	7
Spanish Albums (Promusicae)	85
Swedish Hard Rock Albums (Sverigetopplistan)	18
Swedish Vinyl Albums (Sverigetopplistan)	6
Swiss Albums (Schweizer Hitparade)	12
UK Albums (OCC)	24
US Billboard 200	9
US Independent Albums (Billboard)	1
US Top Hard Rock Albums (Billboard)	1
US Top Rock Albums (Billboard)	1

=== Year-end charts ===
Year-end chart performance for The Lunar Injection Kool Aid Eclipse Conspiracy
Chart (2021)	Position
US Top Rock Albums (Billboard)	92
