= This Patch of Sky =

- Origin: Oregon
- Genres: Post-rock
- Years active: 2010–2019
- Website: facebook.com/thispatchofskymusic

This Patch of Sky were an Oregon instrumental post rock band, formed in 2010 in Eugene. The band typically composed cinematic instrumental pieces that combine subtle-nuanced melodies and wall-of-sound guitars to create a symphonic landscape. The band was signed to German indie label Oxide-Tones in 2011 and released "The Immortal, The Invisible" and "Newly Risen, How Brightly You Shine". In 2013 Oxide-Tones became extinct, resulting in the band releasing full-length album "Heroes and Ghosts" independently. In August 2014, the band released a full-length self-titled album independently. In September 2017, the band signed with Graphic Nature Records, an imprint of Equal Vision Records and released a full-length "These Small Spaces". In September 2019, they disbanded.

On December 30, 2014, This Patch of Sky's studio album Heroes and Ghosts was chosen as AmpKicker's Top 20 albums of 2013.

In January 2014, This Patch of Sky was voted as "Most Improved Artist" in the annual Postrockstar 2013 Year End awards.

== Band members ==
Current

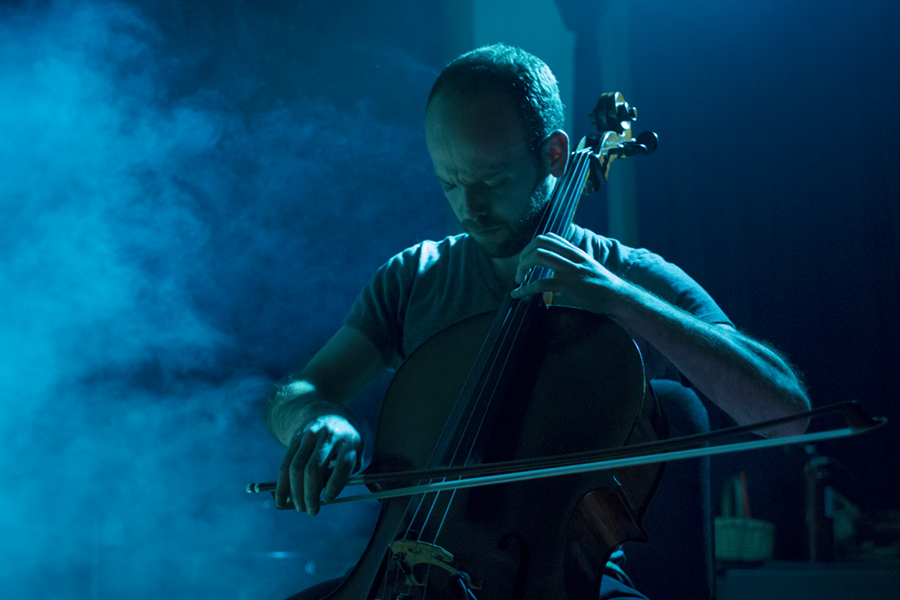
Alex Abrams, cello player for This Patch of Sky

Former

- Andrew Sandahl – guitar (2010–2012)
- Chris King - keyboards, synthesizer, rhodes (2012–2015)
- Austin Zentz - guitar (2012–2013)
- Nate Trowbridge – drums (2010–2016)
- Joel Erickson – bass, synth, rhodes (2010–2019)
- Kit Day – guitar (2010–2019)
- Joshua Carlton – guitar (2012–2019)
- Alex Abrams – cello (2014–2019)
- Neal Williams - bass (2019–2019)
- Katya Marcusky – drums (2016–2019)

== Discography ==
=== Studio albums ===
- Heroes and Ghosts (2013)
- S/T (2014)
- These Small Spaces (Sept 22nd 2017)

=== Soundtracks ===
- Brand: A Second Coming (2015)

=== EPs ===
- The Immortal, The Invisible (2011)
- Newly Risen, How Brightly You Shine (2012)

=== Compilations ===
- Heroes and Ghosts appears on the "Ode To An Unspoken Moment" Compilation(2013)

== In popular culture ==
- Their song "With Morning Comes Hope" is featured in Eric Koston: One Obsession.
- Their song "Newly Risen, How Brightly You Shine" is featured in the 2014 NCAA Men of March video.
- Their song "A Light In The Attic" is used for the trailer Cuando Toco - When Touched
- Their song "A Light In The Attic" is used for the 2012 KIA Cold Hawaii PWA World Cup video.
- Their song "A Light In The Attic" is used for the Ford Mustang 2013 Global Launch video.
- Their song "Newly Risen, How Brightly You Shine" is used for a Petco commercial featuring the Westminster Dog Show.
- Their song "A Light In The Attic" is used in the BFGoodrich "Fresh Tracks" Playground Earth All-Terrain Relay Adventure video.

== See also ==
- List of post-rock bands
- List of instrumental bands
