= The Art of Malice =

Studio album by John 5
- Released: May 11, 2010
- Genre: Instrumental rock; hard rock; heavy metal
- Label: 60 Cycle Hum
- Producer: John 5; Chris Baseford

John 5 chronology
| Remixploitation (2009) | The Art of Malice (2010) | God Told Me To (2012) |

Professional ratings
Review scores
| Source | Rating |
|---|---|
| Allmusic | 3/5 stars |

The Art of Malice is the fifth solo album by John 5. It was released on May 11, 2010.

== Album news ==
- On March 2, 2010, the album's first track, entitled "The Nightmare Unravels," was made available for streaming on John 5's official website and MySpace page. The cover for the album was also revealed. The artwork and photography was done by Ray Gutierrez of Strangebeautifulart.com.

== Track listing ==
| No. | Title | Length |
|---|---|---|
| 1. | "The Nightmare Unravels" | 4:54 |
| 2. | "The Art of Malice" | 1:46 |
| 3. | "Ill Will or Spite" | 4:03 |
| 4. | "J.W." | 3:10 |
| 5. | "Ya Dig?" (feat. Billy Sheehan) | 3:52 |
| 6. | "Can I Live Again" | 4:02 |
| 7. | "Portrayed as Unremorseful" | 3:29 |
| 8. | "Steel Guitar Rag" | 3:00 |
| 9. | "Wayne County Killer" | 3:42 |
| 10. | "Fractured Mirror" (Ace Frehley cover) | 5:09 |
| 11. | "The S-Lot" | 4:13 |
| 12. | "The Last Page Turned" | 3:35 |

== Credits ==
- John 5 – lead guitars, banjo, bass
- Tommy Clufetos – drums
- Greg 'Plushie' Hanna – additional bass ("J.W." and "Steel Guitar Rag".)
