= God Told Me To (album) =

Studio album by John 5
- Released: May 8, 2012
- Genre: Instrumental rock; hard rock
- Length: 40:42
- Label: 60 Cycle Hum/Rocket Science Ventures
- Producer: John 5, Bob Marlette & Chris Baseford

John 5 chronology
The Art of Malice (2010)	God Told Me To (2012)	Careful With That Axe (2014)

Singles from God Told Me To
- 1. "Beat It" Released: 2011

Professional ratings
Review scores
Source	Rating
AllMusic	3.5/5 stars

God Told Me To is the sixth solo album from guitarist John 5. Released on May 8, 2012

The album was initially announced in 2011. John 5 stated in a podcast to Kerrang magazine:

"I have an album called God Told Me To coming out and it's half heavy and it's half acoustic, which I've never done before. I'm doing a cover of Michael Jackson's 'Beat It', an instrumental version of it. And it's gonna be amazing. I'm really excited about this record 'cause of the acoustic stuff, 'cause I've never done that before"

== Album news ==
Promotion of the album started in summer 2011, when John 5 released the first of 4 singles from the album on digital release only. The first being a cover of the Michael Jackson track Beat It. The track was released on August 29, 2011, on what would have been Jackson's 53rd birthday.

There were three more single releases: Welcome to Violence (released on September 27), Noche Acosador (November 1st) and The Castle (December 20).

On September 16, 2011, it was announced the cover for the album would feature a painting of John 5 by Rob Zombie. It was also announced that a DVD would accompany the final album release.

On October 30, 2011, John 5 unveiled the video Welcome to Violence on his website. The video was a montage piece similar to John 5's 2004 video 'God is Closed' which was released to coincide with his first album Vertigo.

On February 23, 2012, John 5 announced that the release date for the album had changed from April 10, 2012, to May 8, 2012.

== Track listing ==
Track listing revealed on February 1, 2012, by the record label Rocket Science who deal with the distribution of John 5's albums. Rocket Science posted the press release on their Facebook page which included the ten tracks on the album.

No.	Title	Length
1.	"Welcome to Violence"	4:15
2.	"Beat It" (Michael Jackson cover)	4:14
3.	"Asland Bump"	3:19
4.	"Killafornia"	4:13
5.	"The Castle"	3:17
6.	"The Hill of the Seven Jackals"	4:04
7.	"Noche Acosador"	3:22
8.	"The Lust Killer"	5:01
9.	"The Lie You Live"	4:23
10.	"Creepy Crawler"	4:52

== Credits ==
- John 5 – All Guitars, Bass, Producer
- Bourbon Bob – Drums
- Chris Baseford – Mixing, Producer
- Bob Marlette – Mixing, Producer
- Rob Zombie – Artwork (Front & Back Painting)
- Bruce Somers @ Undercurrent Studios Los Angeles, CA – Mastering
