= Live to Win =

Studio album by Paul Stanley
- Released: October 24, 2006
- Studio: Henson Recording Studios, Los Angeles
- Genre: Hard rock
- Length: 33:25
- Label: New Door
- Producer: Paul Stanley

Paul Stanley chronology
Paul Stanley (1978)	Live to Win (2006)	One Live Kiss (2008)

Professional ratings
Review scores
Source	Rating
Allmusic	2.5/5 stars
About.com	3/5 stars

Live to Win is the second solo album by Kiss vocalist, guitarist and co-founder Paul Stanley, released on October 24, 2006. The album's title track was featured in the South Park episode "Make Love, Not Warcraft", twenty days prior to the album's release.

== Background ==
Stanley last released a solo album in 1978, Paul Stanley, which was officially released as a Kiss album. Comparing the two albums, Stanley said "It's not 1978 anymore... It's certainly the same mentality, and certainly I'm a better singer today. My perspective and where I'm at in my life at this point, and what I've experienced and seen, brings something else to the table that wasn't there then. But I still look back on that album as a really great snapshot of who I was and what I was doing then."

Stanley supported the album's release with a club tour in late 2006, with one of the shows released on CD and DVD as One Live Kiss.

== Track listing ==
No.	Title	Writer(s)	Length
1.	"Live to Win"	Paul Stanley; Desmond Child; Andreas Carlsson	3:08
2.	"Lift"	Stanley; Child; Marti Frederiksen	4:04
3.	"Wake Up Screaming"	Stanley; Child; Carlsson	3:00
4.	"Everytime I See You Around"	Stanley; Pete Masitti	3:28
5.	"Bulletproof"	Stanley; Carlsson	3:01
6.	"All About You"	Stanley; Child; Carlsson	3:16
7.	"Second to None"	Stanley; Carlsson	3:35
8.	"It's Not Me"	Stanley; Holly Knight; Charlie Midnight	3:19
9.	"Loving You Without You Now"	Stanley	3:16
10.	"Where Angels Dare"	Stanley; Child; John 5	3:22
Total length:			33:25

== Personnel ==
- Paul Stanley – lead and backing vocals, guitar, percussion, string arrangements (tracks 4, 7, 9)
- Corky James – guitar, bass (1, 3, 6, 8, 10)
- Tommy Denander – electric guitar (1, 3)
- Brad Fernquist – lead guitar (1, 3, 4, 6 to 9)
- John 5 – lead guitar (5, 10)
- Andreas Carlsson – guitar, backing vocals (5)
- Sean Hurley – bass (2, 5, 10)
- Bruce Kulick – bass (4, 7, 9)
- Victor Indrizzo – drums
- Greg Kurstin – piano (4, 7, 9)
- Zac Rae – piano (5)
- Harry Sommerdahl – keyboards (1 to 3, 5, 7, 10)
- Russ Irwin – additional keyboards and programming (4, 6, 8)
- C.C. White – backing vocals (5, 10)
- John Shanks – backing vocals (10)
- David Campbell – conductor, orchestratation, strings arrangements (4, 7, 9)
- Tom Jermann/t42design – art direction, design
- Alex Gibson – audio engineering
- Neil Zlozower – photography

== Charts ==
Chart performance for Live to Win
Chart (2006)	Peak position
Australian Albums (ARIA)	95
Austrian Albums (Ö3 Austria)	71
German Albums (Offizielle Top 100)	49
Norwegian Albums (VG-lista)	36
Swedish Albums (Sverigetopplistan)	30
US Billboard 200	53
US Top Rock Albums (Billboard)	14
