= The Electric Warlock Acid Witch Satanic Orgy Celebration Dispenser =

Studio album by Rob Zombie
- Released: April 29, 2016
- Genre: Industrial metal; shock rock
- Length: 31:23
- Label: Zodiac Swan; T-Boy; Universal
- Producer: Zeuss

Rob Zombie chronology
Venomous Rat Regeneration Vendor (2013)	The Electric Warlock Acid Witch Satanic Orgy Celebration Dispenser (2016)	The Lunar Injection Kool Aid Eclipse Conspiracy (2021)

Singles from The Electric Warlock Acid Witch Satanic Orgy Celebration Dispenser
- 1. "Well, Everybody's Fucking in a U.F.O." Released: January 27, 2016; 2. "The Hideous Exhibitions of a Dedicated Gore Whore" Released: March 17, 2016; 3. "In the Age of the Consecrated Vampire We All Get High" Released: April 13, 2016

Professional ratings
Aggregate scores
Source	Rating
Metacritic	69/100
Review scores
Source	Rating
AllMusic	3.5/5 stars
The A.V. Club	B
Consequence of Sound	C−
Metal Hammer	4/5 stars
New Noise Magazine	4/5 stars
Q	3/5 stars
The Sydney Morning Herald	3.5/5 stars
Ultimate Guitar	7/10

The Electric Warlock Acid Witch Satanic Orgy Celebration Dispenser is the sixth solo studio album by American heavy metal vocalist Rob Zombie. It was released on April 29, 2016.

== Singles ==
On January 27, 2016, "Well, Everybody's Fucking in a U.F.O." debuted on SiriusXM.

On March 17, 2016, "The Hideous Exhibitions of a Dedicated Gore Whore" was made available on iTunes if the album was preordered.

On April 14, 2016, the video for "In the Age of the Consecrated Vampire We All Get High" was released on YouTube.

== Commercial performance ==
The album debuted at number six on the Billboard 200 with 41,000 album-equivalent units; it sold 40,000 copies in its first week. It was the fifth-best-selling album of the week and spent three more in the Top 200 before falling off the chart. The Electric Warlock Acid Witch Satanic Orgy Celebration Dispenser became Zombie's sixth consecutive top ten album.

== Track listing ==
All lyrics are written by Rob Zombie; all music is composed by Rob Zombie and John 5.

No.	Title	Length
1.	"The Last of the Demons Defeated"	1:32
2.	"Satanic Cyanide! The Killer Rocks On!"	3:00
3.	"The Life and Times of a Teenage Rock God"	2:53
4.	"Well, Everybody's Fucking in a U.F.O."	2:43
5.	"A Hearse That Overturns with the Coffin Bursting Open"	1:30
6.	"The Hideous Exhibitions of a Dedicated Gore Whore"	2:46
7.	"Medication for the Melancholy"	2:26
8.	"In the Age of the Consecrated Vampire We All Get High"	2:15
9.	"Super-Doom-Hex-Gloom Part One"	1:29
10.	"In the Bone Pile"	2:33
11.	"Get Your Boots On! That's the End of Rock and Roll"	2:46
12.	"Wurdalak"	5:30
Total length:		31:23

== Personnel ==
- Rob Zombie – vocals
- John 5 – guitars
- Piggy D. – bass
- Ginger Fish – drums

Production

- Zeuss – production, engineering, mixing, keyboards, programming
- Tom Baker – mastering

== Charts ==
=== Weekly charts ===
Chart (2016)	Peak position
Australian Albums (ARIA)	8
Austrian Albums (Ö3 Austria)	40
Belgian Albums (Ultratop Flanders)	65
Belgian Albums (Ultratop Wallonia)	101
Canadian Albums (Billboard)	7
Finnish Albums (Suomen virallinen lista)	38
French Albums (SNEP)	118
German Albums (Offizielle Top 100)	40
Scottish Albums (OCC)	20
Swiss Albums (Schweizer Hitparade)	43
UK Albums (OCC)	25
UK Rock & Metal Albums (OCC)	3
US Billboard 200	6
US Top Hard Rock Albums (Billboard)	1
US Top Rock Albums (Billboard)	1

=== Year-end charts ===
Chart (2016)	Position
US Top Rock Albums (Billboard)	46
