= Ozzfest 2002 =

Live album by Various Artists
- Released: August 27, 2002
- Genre: Heavy metal, hard rock, rapcore, alternative metal, nu metal, doom metal, metalcore, speed metal, groove metal
- Length: 1:14:25
- Language: English
- Label: Sony
- Producer: Thom Panunzio

Various Artists chronology
Ozzfest 2001: The Second Millennium (2001)	Ozzfest 2002 (2002)	Ozzfest: 10th Anniversary (2005)

Professional ratings
Review scores
Source	Rating
Allmusic	3.5/5 stars

Ozzfest 2002 is a live recording of Ozzfest 2002. It was recorded during the concert in Boston, and has the Main Stage performances of Hard rock and other similar style bands as System of a Down, Rob Zombie and Adema. The Album also has performances of Second Stage bands such as Meshuggah and SOiL. The album includes guest appearances from Zakk Wylde and Kelly Osbourne.

== Track listing ==
1. Ozzy Osbourne - "War Pigs" - 8:03
2. System of a Down - "Needles" - 3:41
3. Rob Zombie - "More Human than Human" - 4:31
4. P.O.D. - "Outkast" - 5:13
5. Drowning Pool - "Creeping Death" - 5:32
6. Adema - "Freaking Out" - 3:39
7. Black Label Society - "Berserkers" - 5:54
8. Down - "Ghosts Along the Mississippi" - 5:21
9. Hatebreed - "A Call for Blood" - 3:14
10. SOiL with Zakk Wylde - "Halo" - 3:48
11. Flaw - "Payback" - 4:14
12. 3rd Strike - "All Lies" - 3:33
13. Pulse Ultra - "Big Brother" - 3:31
14. Ill Niño - "Liar" - 4:39
15. Meshuggah - "New Millennium Cyanide Christ" - 5:21
16. Andrew W.K. with Kelly Osbourne - "She Is Beautiful" - 4:03
