= Hunt Music =

Compilation album by Ted Nugent
- Released: 1 June 2004
- Genre: Rock
- Label: Broadhead Music
- Producer: Ted Nugent

Ted Nugent chronology
Craveman (2002)	Hunt Music (2004)	Love Grenade (2007)

Hunt Music is a compilation album by American rock musician Ted Nugent. The album did not see a large release but is still available on Internet sites. The second disc contains bonus tracks recorded by Ted Nugent. "I Just Wanna Go Hunting" had been unreleased at the time before being put into the 2018 album The Music Made Me Do It.

== Track listing ==
=== Disc 1 ===
1. "Spirit of the Wild"
2. "Fred Bear Jam - Live Nugent"
3. "Sunrize" (instrumental)
4. "Tooth Fang & Claw"
5. "Fred Bear - The American Hunter's Theme Song"
6. "Earthtones"
7. "I Just Wanna Go Hunting"
8. "Sunrize" (narrated)
9. "KLSTRBK"
10. "My Bow & Arrow"
11. "Great White Buffalo"
- Rob Grange appears on "Great White Buffalo" and "Tooth, Fang and Claw"

=== Disc 2 ===
1. "Physics of Spirituality Part One"
2. "Physics of Spirituality Part Two"
3. "Hibernation"
