= Jimmy Henley =

American banjo player

Background information
- Birth name: James V. Henley
- Born: September 12, 1960; Hobbs, New Mexico, US
- Died: March 22, 2020 (aged 59); Broken Arrow, Oklahoma, US
- Genres: Bluegrass
- Occupation: Musician
- Instrument: Banjo
- Years active: 1968–2020
- Formerly of: Jimmy Henley and A Touch of Grass

James V. "Jimmy" Henley (September 2, 1960 – March 22, 2020) was an American banjo player who played bluegrass music. He won several banjo contests as a young boy. As a young boy he met country music star Roy Clark at the New Mexico State Fair and Clark invited him to perform on National television.

== Early life ==
He was born and raised in Hobbs, New Mexico. When he was seven years old he won the Junior Division of the National Bluegrass Banjo Championship at Bill Grant’s Bluegrass Festival in Hugo, Oklahoma. At ten years old he won the World Bluegrass Banjo Championship in Memphis, Tennessee.

== Career ==
After his contest-winning success performing banjo as a child, multi-instrumentalist Roy Clark met Henley at the New Mexico State Fair. He then appeared on the television show Hee Haw and on many other nationally televised programs, including The Mike Douglas Show, the Merv Griffin Show, the Tonight Show. Later he toured with Roy Clark. In 2007 he was touring with his band "Jimmy Henley and A Touch of Grass".

On March 22, 2020 he died of throat cancer at his home in Broken Arrow, Oklahoma.

== Legacy ==
The guitarist John 5 has claimed Jimmy Henley as one of his inspirations. When John 5 was seven years old he watched Jimmy Henley play banjo on the family variety show Hee Haw. In an interview John 5 said, "It's crazy there's this exact moment when I realized I wanted to play . . . it changed my life."
