= Keepin' Halloween Alive =

Single by Alice Cooper
- B-side: "I Love The Dead (Live)"
- Released: September 29, 2009
- Genre: Shock rock, hard rock
- Length: 2:13
- Label: Bigger Picture Group 525 541
- Songwriters: Alice Cooper, Piggy D.
- Producers: Alice Cooper, Piggy D.

Alice Cooper singles chronology
| "Gimme" (2000) | "Keepin' Halloween Alive" (2009) | "I'll Bite Your Face Off" (2011) |

"Keepin' Halloween Alive" is a song by rock musician Alice Cooper, released in 2009.

The song was initially available exclusively on iTunes. The purchase of the single included a digital booklet and a sing-along, "Cooper-oke" version of the song featuring no vocals. A contest also took place with winners chosen by Alice himself based on video karaoke versions of the song sent in by fans. Only three winners were picked with prizes ranging from $1,000 to $250 and were submitted by October 31, 2009.

In October, 2010, a 7-inch vinyl single was released. This version was a limited edition of 2,300 copies, and had glow-in-the-dark vinyl. The B-side of the single was a live version of "I Love the Dead".

== Personnel ==
- Alice Cooper – lead vocals, backing vocals
- Dave Pino – lead guitar, bass, fender rhodes, theremin
- Piggy D. – rhythm guitar, backing vocals
- David Spreng – drums, percussion, harpsichord
