= Love Grenade =

Studio album by Ted Nugent
- Released: September 4, 2007
- Recorded: 2007
- Studio: DRS Studios, Waco, Texas
- Genre: Hard rock, heavy metal
- Length: 57:56
- Label: Eagle
- Producer: Ted Nugent

Ted Nugent chronology
Hunt Music (2003)	Love Grenade (2007)	Sweden Rocks (2008)

Pre-release cover

Love Grenade is the 13th solo studio album by American rock and roll musician Ted Nugent. It was released on September 4, 2007. It was recorded at DRS Studios in Waco, Texas. Sales figures, however, have been low, with the album only selling 3,000 copies in its first week, landing it at No. 186 on the Billboard 200.

The album features a new version of the song "Journey to the Center of the Mind", a hit for Nugent's 1960s group The Amboy Dukes.

The pre-release cover art drew some controversy, as it depicts a naked woman bound and bent over on a large platter, with a grenade in her mouth. Eagle Records pulled the planned cover, and instead released a milder design featuring a hand grenade with a pink ribbon affixed.

== Track listing ==
1. "Love Grenade" – 5:03
2. "Still Raising Hell" – 3:21
3. "Funk U" – 4:00
4. "Girl Scout Cookies" – 4:03
5. "Journey to the Center of the Mind" – 4:21
6. "Geronimo & Me" – 4:44
7. "EagleBrother" (instrumental) – 4:38
8. "Spirit of the Buffalo" – 7:29
9. "Aborigine" – 3:22
10. "Stand" – 2:43
11. "Broadside" – 3:36
12. "Bridge over Troubled Daughters" – 3:36
13. "Lay with Me" – 6:23
- All songs written and arranged by Ted Nugent, except "Journey to the Center of the Mind", written by Steve Farmer/Ted Nugent.

== Reception ==
Professional ratings
Review scores
Source	Rating
AllMusic	1/5 stars

Critical reception of the album was mixed to negative. Stephen Thomas Erlewine of AllMusic declared the album "sterile" and representing "the same old hard rock that Nugent has been cranking out for over three decades now, and it sure sounds like he's been doing it that long, as the riffs are recycled, the production is too clean, and the performances too professional."

== Personnel ==
Band members

- Ted Nugent – guitars, lead vocals, producer
- Barry Sparks – bass guitar (except "Love Grenade", "Spirit of the Buffalo" and "Lay with Me")
- Tommy Clufetos – drums

Additional musicians

- Jack Blades – bass guitar on "Love Grenade", "Spirit of the Buffalo" and "Lay with Me", background vocals, producer
- Eric Martin, Will Evankovich, April Grisman, Amber Morris, Tommy Shaw – background vocals

Production

- Chris Manning, Matt Cohen – engineers
- Steven Rosas, Kayla Rosas – pre-production recording engineers
- Juan J. Orteaga – mixing
- Dave Donnelly – mastering
- John Rios – disc artwork
- James & Maryln Brown – live photos
- Nick Zimba – Little Kid with big grenade photo
- Neil Zlozower – Platter girl photo
- Peter Tsakiris – package design & layout

== Charts ==
Chart (2007)	Peak position
US Billboard 200	186
US Independent Albums (Billboard)	22
