= John 5 (guitarist) =

American guitarist

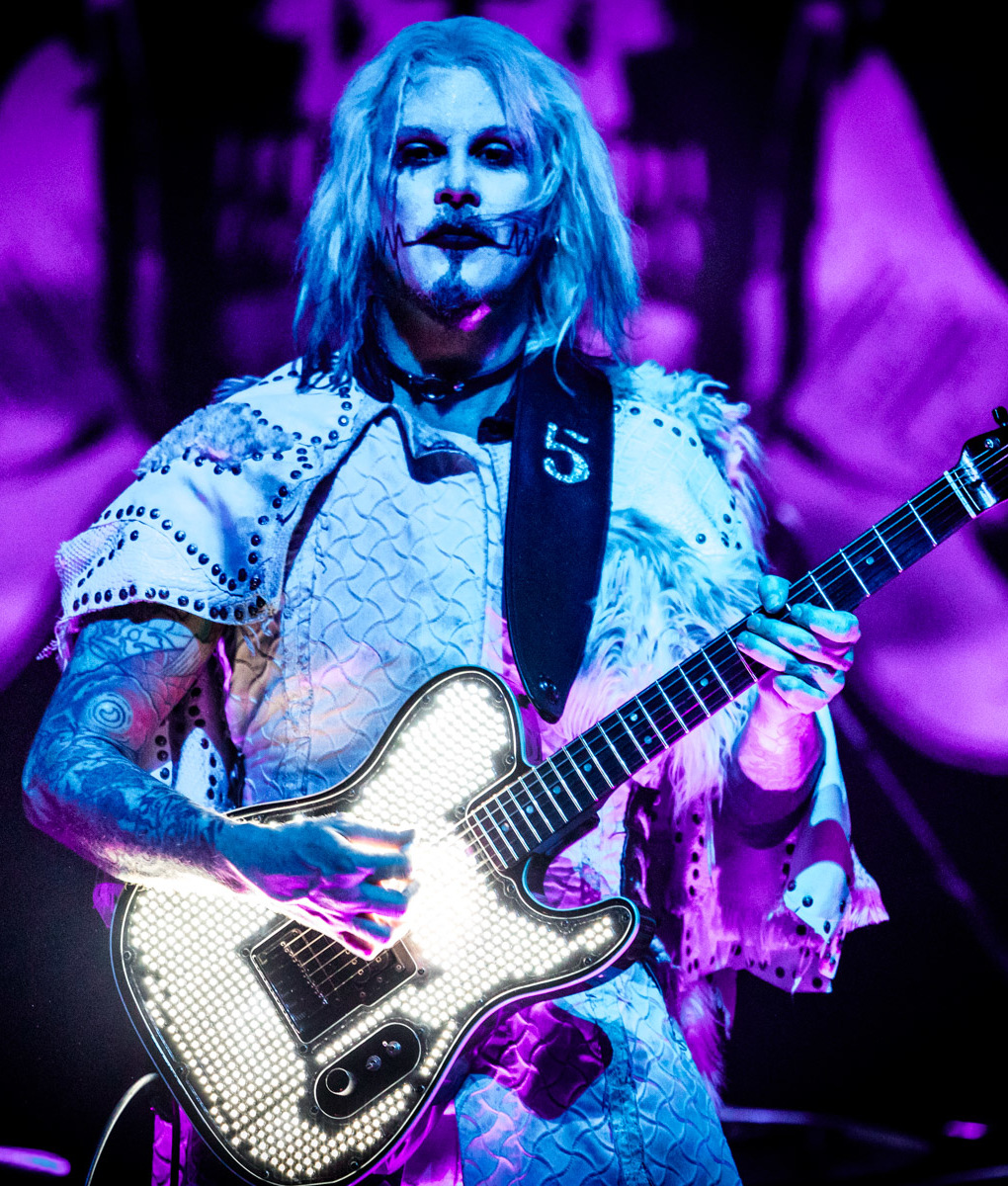
- John 5 performing in Vancouver in 2019

Background information
- Born: John William Lowery; July 31, 1970 (age 56); Grosse Pointe, Michigan, U.S.
- Genres: Heavy metal; alternative metal; nu metal; gothic rock; hard rock; pop rock; alternative rock; shock rock; avant-garde metal; groove metal; glam metal; industrial metal; industrial rock; bluegrass
- Occupations: Musician; songwriter
- Instrument: Guitar
- Years active: 1987–present
- Labels: Nothing; Interscope; Shrapnel; 60 Cycle Hum; Geffen
- Member of: Mötley Crüe; L.A. Rats
- Formerly of: Rob Zombie; David Lee Roth Band; 2wo; Marilyn Manson; Loser; Alligator Soup
- Website: john-5.com

John William Lowery (born July 31, 1970), known by the stage name John 5, is an American guitarist. He took the stage name in 1998 when he left David Lee Roth's solo band and joined Marilyn Manson. Lowery later became the guitarist for Rob Zombie, and in 2022, became the touring guitarist for Mötley Crüe, being promoted to a full member the following year.

As a solo artist, he has recored eleven largely instrumental albums: Vertigo (2004), Songs for Sanity (2005), The Devil Knows My Name (2007), Requiem (2008), The Art of Malice (2010), God Told Me To (2012), Careful With That Axe (2014), Season of the Witch (2017), Invasion (2019), Sinner (2021), and Ghost (2025). He also has a remix album, Remixploitation (2009), and live albums It's Alive (2018) and Live Invasion (2020). As a staff writer for Chrysalis Records, he has worked with artists such as Avril Lavigne, Rob Halford, k.d. lang, Garbage, Meat Loaf, Scorpions, Ozzy Osbourne, Slash, FeFe Dobson, and Steve Perry. He has written and recorded with Southern rock band Lynyrd Skynyrd.

His stage name was given to him by Manson, and refers to both the Bible chapter and him being the fifth member of Manson's band.

== Early life ==
Lowery is a native of Grosse Pointe, Michigan. He first started playing guitar at age seven after watching Buck Owens and Roy Clark's television show Hee Haw with his father. Specifically, Lowery recalls being inspired by seeing a young Jimmy Henley playing banjo.

His parents supported his playing as long as it did not interfere with his education. He took guitar lessons from Detroit guitarist Robert Gillespie, who taught him classic blues and rock 'n' roll. His parents accompanied him to the adult bars where he played.

His early musical influences came from the Monkees, Kiss, Eddie Van Halen, Randy Rhoads, Jimi Hendrix, Yngwie Malmsteen, and country music.

== Career ==
=== 1987–1995: Early career ===
Lowery started his career as a session guitarist, having moved to Los Angeles from Michigan at age 17. His first band in L.A. was Alligator Soup. This led to an important meeting with Rudy Sarzo from Whitesnake, who recruited Lowery for his band Sun King, giving him his first real exposure.

Lowery began working on numerous projects with producer Bob Marlette, including television show soundtracks and the film Speed 2: Cruise Control, as well as commercials and infomercials. Lowery was hired by Lita Ford to join her opening for Kiss. He started another long friendship with the various Kiss members, including a close friendship with Paul Stanley which resulted in his guesting on Stanley's Live to Win album.

Lowery then worked with Randy Castillo in the short-lived projects Bone Angels and Red Square Black, who issued the Square EP via Zoo/BMG. This stopped when Lowery was picked to play with k.d. lang on tour.

=== 1996–1998: 2wo ===
Lowery teamed up with former Judas Priest frontman Rob Halford, along with Sid Riggs (drums), James Woolley (keyboards), and Ray Riendeau (bass) to work on an industrial metal-inspired album, under the band name of 2wo (Two). The subsequent album (Voyeurs) was recorded at Trent Reznor's New Orleans studio, and was released on Reznor's Nothing Records label, under the parent company Interscope Records (Universal). The album was not a commercial hit, but did produce one video, made by director Chi Chi Larue, for the first single, "I am a Pig".

=== 1998–2003: David Lee Roth ===
Lowery played lead guitar on former Van Halen frontman David Lee Roth's 1998 release DLR Band.

Regarding how he came to meet Roth, in Guitarist Magazine, Lowery relates that, "when I was little, my dream was to play with David Lee Roth. One day I was sitting at my friend's house and... I wonder[ed] what... Roth is doing now. I'm gonna call up his manager and see if he needs any songs."

Lowery submitted six tracks that he had written to Roth's management. Roth scheduled a meeting and then scheduled a recording session that lasted two weeks and resulted in the fourteen track DLR Band album. "I remember before we started, he [David Lee Roth] said, 'If you can't do it in two takes, you can't do it.'"

In 2003, while still lead guitarist for Marilyn Manson, Lowery (then called John 5) was invited by David Lee Roth to write and record the single non-cover song for Roth's 2003 album Diamond Dave.

=== 1998–2004: Marilyn Manson ===
After the recording of Mechanical Animals, Marilyn Manson was again looking for a guitarist to replace Zim Zum who had left the band during the recording process. Lowery again went to try out for the band. Following a tour with Rob Halford in Europe, Lowery received a call from Manson's manager asking if he would like to meet Manson for lunch. At the meeting Manson asked Lowery to join the band. Lowery accepted and Manson gave him the name "John 5". As Lowery put it, "right then and there. It was obviously something he'd been thinking about." Lowery signed on for the Mechanical Animals tour. His first live performance for Marilyn Manson came on the MTV Video Music Awards.

Lowery has long expressed pride in being part of Marilyn Mason's band during some of its most formative projects. The band's first recorded project featuring Lowery on guitar was The Last Tour on Earth, which featured live tracks that were curated by Lowery with minimal post-production editing, as he explained in an interview in 2012: "That album, we were so good as a band. We were just really tight and really good. That album is 100 percent live. [...] There's not even overdubs on that thing."

Following the Mechanical Animals tour, Lowery said the band worked collaboratively to create the album Holy Wood, approaching the project as a live band rather than having bassist Twiggy Ramirez do the majority of the songwriting:

"We all collaborated as a band...which was great. It was me and Twiggy and Manson and Ginger and Pogo, everybody, we all collaborated as this group, which was awesome, so...I remember us getting together in the Houdini House, Rick Rubin's place, and we set up as a band in the in the living room and we played. Everybody was playing and we were working out ideas and I remember Ginger, the drummer, saying that's the first time we've ever done anything like that."

==== 2003 Rock Am Ring conflict on stage ====
During the opening bars of "The Beautiful People" at the 2003 Rock Am Ring festival, Manson was moving across the stage when he hit Lowery's guitar and chest with his boot. Lowery was outraged and threw his guitar while screaming at Manson, which led to much speculation. According to Lowery, the Grotesk Burlesk tour had been a high-pressure endeavor, and Lowery was under stress from multiple family tragedies. Lowery stated the incident was "unprofessional" and that he cannot watch the video footage.

==== Lowery and Manson split in 2004 ====
In 2004, Lowery and Manson parted company. Confusion was rife as certain press reported that he had been dumped unceremoniously from the band. A statement released by Lowery indicated that the split was "completely amicable." While working with Manson, Lowery stated that Manson may have harbored resentment toward him since he does not do drugs or drink alcohol, whereas Manson "is not like that." However, Lowery claims Manson never stated this explicitly to him.

Decades after his dismissal, Lowery clarified that he was fired by Manson. Lowery told Billy Corgan in a 2025 interview that one of his bandmates "was trying to get me out" by accusing him of making mistakes on stage, which Lowery disproved using recordings of the band's live performances. The conflict ultimately led to Lowery's dismissal. "I got fired. I didn't know why, because ... all I wanted to do was play perfect, be on time. And I was their biggest cheerleader, you know?"

Lowery says that Manson later called and apologized for the split, and that the former bandmates maintained a positive connection He was photographed in attendance of Mason's 56th birthday party in January, 2025.

=== 2005–2006: Loser ===
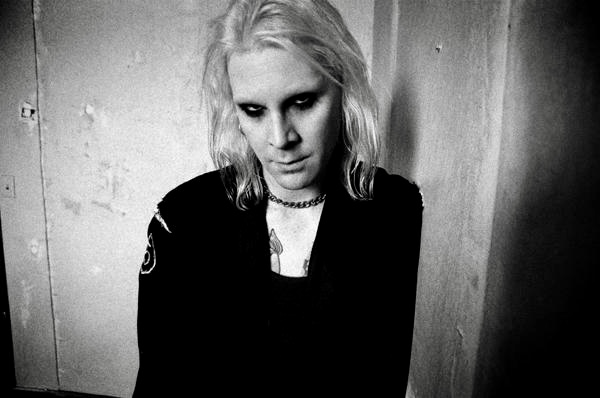
Lowery in 2006

In 2005, Lowery formed the band Loser. Recruiting vocalist Joe Grah, Charles Lee on bass, and Glendon Crain on drums, they began working on their debut album Just Like You. The band was also partly co-founded by friend and producer Bob Marlette. Vocalist Joe Grah already had a significant amount of success in his home state of Texas, with the band Jibe. Marlette recommended Grah to Lowery, and so Lowery hopped on a plane to Texas to see the band play. Grah flew back to L.A. and was hired on the spot.

The name Loser came about as an affirmation to Lowery's past: "I was from Grosse Pointe, Michigan, which is kind of an upper-class area, and I was always that rock kid," John explained. "I started playing guitar at age 7. I always had a rock shirt on, and I had that tattoo early on. I looked like a loser because everyone around me was wearing Polo and Brooks Brothers. But now if you go into a club wearing Polo, you're called a loser. So I think everyone can relate to that name, and the album title, Just Like You, sums it up."

The band had initial success not long after signing with Island Records, when the track "Disposable Sunshine" became part of the Fantastic Four soundtrack.

During this time, during the recording of the soundtrack, Crain briefly left the band and was replaced by drummer Elias Andra, a friend of Lee's. Andra had some success himself with the band Psycho Plague, his own creation, an industrial metal band, which toured as a headline act with Linkin Park as an opening act at the time. However, Andra soon left after promotional shots had been taken, and Crain returned. Andra went on to become the drummer for Julien-K.

At the same time, Lowery was also working for Rob Zombie and a working conflict occurred. As Zombie was also touring, Lowery tried to find a live replacement for him while Loser were touring on conflicting dates. However, even with promo material for the debut album out and a release date in the bag, Island Records did not like the idea of Loser without John and so dropped the band from the label.

"Being the founding member of Loser, my decision to leave was not an easy one", said Lowery in a press release. "I've been juggling two careers both with Loser and Rob Zombie for over one year now. I found it impossible to be in two places at once."

The album has been put on the backburner, and no word on a release date has ever been issued. The official Loser Myspace page has tracks available for download (working on April 11, 2012). The album was never officially released, but promotional copies were distributed to radio stations and music industry insiders, and have become collector's items among fans.

=== 2005–2022: Rob Zombie ===
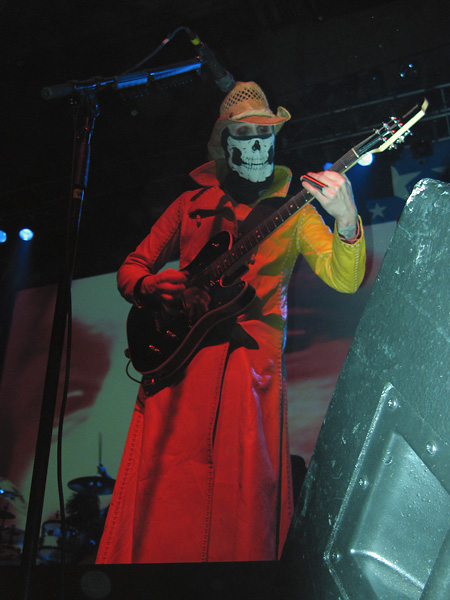
Lowery performing with Rob Zombie in 2006

While Lowery was working with Loser, he also began to work with cult rock artist and movie director Rob Zombie. Meeting at the Camp Freddy benefit gig, Lowery and Zombie hit it off immediately and Rob asked Lowery to play with him at Ozzfest 2005. "I'm totally ecstatic about having the opportunity to play with Rob on Ozzfest! He has been one of my favorite artists for the longest time. I had the opportunity to play with him a few weeks back and never thought that I would have the chance to share the stage with him playing the Zombie songs we all know and love!"

Lowery worked on Rob Zombie's 2006 album Educated Horses, co-writing eight out of eleven tracks with Zombie. When he left Loser, Lowery took up the role of Rob Zombie guitarist as a permanent gig. "Rob is the best I have worked with. He's great. We have a great time on stage together. It has been the single greatest experience I have had working with someone, hands down." John is also the guitarist on Rob's latest albums, Hellbilly Deluxe 2, released February 2, 2010, Venomous Rat Regeneration Vendor, released April 23, 2013, The Electric Warlock Acid Witch Satanic Orgy Celebration Dispenser, released April 29, 2016, and The Lunar Injection Kool Aid Eclipse Conspiracy, released March 12, 2021.

In early 2011, Lowery was joined by fellow ex-Marilyn Manson bandmate, Ginger Fish, as a member of Rob Zombie's band.

In October 2011, Zombie announced that Lowery would be scoring the soundtrack for his latest movie The Lords of Salem.

In May 2021, Lowery, along with Rob Zombie, Nikki Sixx, and Tommy Clufetos, formed the supergroup L.A. Rats. Their debut track, "I've Been Everywhere", appeared on the soundtrack to the Liam Neeson film The Ice Road.

=== 2022–present: Mötley Crüe ===
On October 26, 2022, it was announced that Mick Mars would be retiring as a touring guitarist from Mötley Crüe due to ongoing health issues. Rumors had been circulating that Lowery would take over as Mars' replacement, especially since Lowery did not show for a Rob Zombie concert at Aftershock in Sacramento, California. On October 27, Mötley Crüe confirmed that Lowery had taken his place.

=== 2004–present: Solo career ===
Starting in 2004 with Vertigo, Lowery has recorded eleven instrumental records. His works have featured many guest players. Songs for Sanity featured Albert Lee, and other records have had Steve Vai, Joe Satriani, and Jim Root. In 2009, Lowery released a remix album, Remixploitation. He has also released an instructional DVD entitled The Devil Knows My Name (2007). In July 2009, on his Twitter page, Lowery announced that he was six tracks into his next solo album. On October 2, 2009, he played with Slash at a tribute to the Mirage Hotel in Las Vegas.

In a Twitter update on January 6, 2010, Lowery said, about the progress of his upcoming fifth studio album: "Just did all the guitar, bass for my new solo CD, Tommy Clufetos played the drums and killed it!" and a following Twitter update January 8; "Did the photo shoot for the new record today!", January 18: "Just had Billy sheehan play on the the [sic] song (ya dig), this record is going to rule".

In June 2011, Lowery officially closed his MySpace page. John commented on his own website, "There are a number of reasons, mainly the decline of Myspace as a platform to reach you, the fans. ... So today, the steps were taken to close the account at the Myspace page."

Lowery released his seventh solo album, Careful with That Axe, in August 2014. He released his eighth solo album, Season of the Witch, on March 3, 2017. He released his first live album, It's Alive, in early 2018, and toured in the early and late months of 2018 in support of it. Lowery released his ninth solo album, Invasion, on July 31, 2019. He was on the road in early and late 2019 in support of the album. His tenth solo album, Sinner, was released on October 29, 2021. His eleventh solo album, Ghost, was released on October 10, 2025, following five singles.

== Personal life ==
Lowery has been married twice. He married his first wife, actress Aria Giovanni, in 2005, but they divorced in 2006. He then married hair stylist Rita Aghajani on June 7, 2009. Lowery has two children from his first marriage and a step-son from his marriage to Aghajani.

== Equipment ==
During 2005, Lowery used Marshall amplifiers and cabinets, Boss pedals, Fender Telecaster and J5 guitars, and Dean Markley strings.

=== The "Sinner" guitar ===
In July 2024, Lowery was featured on the cover of Guitar Player magazine holding a custom illuminated Fender Telecaster featuring artwork inspired by his 2021 album, Sinner.

== Discography and films ==
=== Solo ===
Albums

- 2004: Vertigo
- 2005: Songs for Sanity
- 2007: The Devil Knows My Name
- 2008: Requiem
- 2009: Remixploitation (Remix album)
- 2010: The Art of Malice
- 2012: God Told Me To (CD/DVD)
- 2014: Careful With That Axe
- 2017: Season of the Witch
- 2018: It's Alive (Live album)
- 2019: Invasion
- 2020: Live Invasion (Live album)
- 2021: Sinner
- 2025: Ghost

DVD

- 2004: God Is Closed Vol. 1 (2004, bonus disc for Japanese release of Vertigo)
- 2007: The Devil Knows My Name (instructional DVD)
- 2008: IMV Behind the Player (instructional DVD)
- 2008: IMV Behind the Player (instructional DVD with Tommy Clufetos, on which Lowery appears)

Singles

- "Welcome to the Jungle" (Guns N' Roses cover – 2006)
- "Laurie's Theme" (Halloween II: Original Motion Picture Soundtrack, 2009)
- "Beat It" (Michael Jackson cover – 2011)
- "Welcome to Violence" (September 27, 2011)
- "Noche Acosador" (November 1, 2011)
- "The Castle" (December 20, 2011)
- "This Is My Rifle" (June 10, 2014)
- "Black Grass Plague" (January 1, 2016)
- "Behind the Nut Love" (February 1, 2016)
- "Making Monsters" (March 1, 2016)
- "Now Fear This" (April 1, 2016)
- "Here's to the Crazy Ones" (May 1, 2016)
- "Enter Sandman" (Metallica cover - October 13, 2017)
- "Zoinks!" (January 1, 2019)
- "Crank It/ Living With Ghosts" (February 1, 2019)
- "I am John 5" (March 1, 2019)
- "Midnight Mass" (April 1, 2019)
- "I Want It All" (July 31, 2019)
- "Que Pasa" (September 17, 2021)
- "Land of the Misfit Toys" (November 2, 2021)
- "Strung Out" (February 7, 2023)
- "The Ghost" (December 27, 2023)
- "A Hollywood Story" (June 11, 2024)
- "Fiend" (May 16, 2025)

=== Loser ===
Albums

- Just Like You (2006) Unreleased

Singles

- "Disposable Sunshine" (Fantastic 4: The Album, 2005)
- "Nobody Knows" (2006)
- "The First Time" (2006)

=== Marilyn Manson ===
Albums

- Mechanical Animals (1998, credited as live guitarist)
- The Last Tour on Earth (1999, live album)
- Holy Wood (In the Shadow of the Valley of Death) (2000)
- The Golden Age of Grotesque (2003)
- Lest We Forget: The Best Of (2004, compilation album released after Lowery's departure; he is thanked in the album credits)

DVD & VHS

- God Is in the T.V. (1999)
- Guns, God and Government (2002)
- Doppelherz (2003, released as a The Golden Age of Grotesque bonus DVD)

=== Rob Zombie ===
Albums

- Educated Horses (2006)
- Zombie Live (2007)
- Hellbilly Deluxe 2 (2010)
- Venomous Rat Regeneration Vendor (2013)
- Spookshow International: Live (2015)
- The Electric Warlock Acid Witch Satanic Orgy Celebration Dispenser (2016)
- Astro-Creep: 2000 Live (2018)
- The Lunar Injection Kool Aid Eclipse Conspiracy (2021)

Singles

- "War Zone" (2008)

DVD

- Ozzy Osbourne's Ozzfest 10th Anniversary (2005)
- The Zombie Horror Picture Show (2014)

=== Motley Crue ===
Singles

- "Dogs of War" (2024)

EP

- "Cancelled" (2024)

=== Miscellaneous work ===
Red Square Black

- Square EP (1994)

2wo

- Voyeurs (1998)

David Lee Roth

- DLR Band (1998)
- Diamond Dave (2003, co-wrote "Thug Pop")

Paul Stanley

- Live to Win (2006, co-wrote "Where Angels Dare")

Alice Cooper

- Welcome 2 My Nightmare (2011, featured on "Disco Bloodbath Boogie Fever")

Sebastian Bach

- Kicking & Screaming (2011, co-wrote and played on "TunnelVision")
- Give 'Em Hell (2014, co-wrote and played on "Temptation")
- Child Within the Man (2024, co-wrote and played on "Freedom")

Adler

- Back from the Dead (2012, featured on "Good to be Bad")

Beware of Darkness

- Orthodox (2013, co-wrote "All Who Remain")

Ace Frehley

- Origins, Vol. 1 (2016, played on "Spanish Castle Magic" and "Parasite")
- Origins, Vol. 2 (2020, played on "I'm Down" and "Politician")

Steve Perry

- Traces (2018, co-wrote and played on "Sun Shines Gray")

Peter Criss

  - Peter Criss (2025, played guitar on "Creepy Crawlers", "Justice" and "Rubberneckin")

=== Films ===
- The Lords of Salem (2012, composer)
- Turn It Up! A Celebration of the Electric Guitar (2014, Amazon Prime documentary participant)
- 31 (film) (2016, composer)
- Hired Gun (2016, documentary participant)

=== Television ===
- Top Ten Revealed (AXS TV) (participant on various episodes)

== Credits ==
- John Wetton (of Asia) – Lowery's first paid professional session
- Robin Zander (Cheap Trick singer) – guitarist, recorded demos
- Wilson Phillips – guitarist, ghost player
- Salt-N-Pepa – live performances including the Jay Leno Show (April 14, 1995)
- Rick Springfield – guitarist, The Day After Yesterday, tracks 4 and 14
- Night Ranger – guitarist, ghost player
- Red Square Black – 1994 – Square EP, lead guitar
- Lita Ford – 1994–95 – guitarist, ghost player
- Ryan Downe – 1996 – guitar on track "Japan" on The Hypocrite, plus guitar effects
- froSTed – 1996 – guitarist
- Leah Andreone – "Veiled", guitar (1996), "I Feel the Earth Move", guitar (1997), "Alchemy", lap steel guitar/guitar (1998), co-wrote ten tracks
- k.d. lang – guitarist, World Tour 1996, 1997; onstage "Live in Sydney" recording
- Various Artists, Speed 2: Cruise Control – 1997 – guitar and bass for soundtrack
- 2wo – 1998 – Voyeurs album, guitar and bass
- David Lee Roth – 1998, 2003 – guitarist on DLR Band album, and co-wrote "Thug Pop" on Diamond Dave
- Marilyn Manson – 1998–2004 – guitarist, where he got the moniker "John 5". Manson has claimed the name derives from Lowery's first name plus the number 5, noting there was a time he considered naming himself and his bandmates with numbers. This continued the departure from the "pin-up + serial killer" naming scheme.
- Garbage – 2003 – additional guitar on "Never Be Free" b-side, possibly co-written by him as well
- Loser – 2005–2006 – guitarist and founder member of Loser. The band had a song ("Disposable Sunshine") on the Fantastic Four soundtrack and had recorded their debut album Just Like You, but due to conflicting schedules with Rob Zombie, Lowery left the band and Island Records.
- Rob Zombie – 2005–2022 – guitarist, Ozzfest 2005 and several albums
- Meat Loaf – 2006 – guitarist, song recorded and co-wrote with Nikki Sixx – Bat Out of Hell III: The Monster Is Loose
- Paul Stanley – 2006 – co-writer and guitarist on "Where Angels Dare" on Live to Win
- Saliva – 2007 – guitarist on "Black Sheep" on Blood Stained Love Story
- Static-X – 2007 – first guitar solo on "Cannibal"
- Scorpions – 2007 – co-writer and guitarist on "Hour 1" on Humanity: Hour I
- Filter – 2008 – guitarist on Anthems for the Damned, co-writer on two tracks
- Lynyrd Skynyrd – 2009 – guitarist
- Halestorm – 2009 – writer – co-wrote the track "What Were You Expecting".
- Chuck Mosley – 2009 – guitar on "The Enabler", a track from the album Will Rap Over Hard Rock for Food
- Escape the Fate – 2010 – composer – helped compose self-titled album
- Ricky Martin – 2011 – guitar and arranger on Martin's 2010 album Música + Alma + Sexo
- Hollywood Undead – 2011 – guitar on "Lights Out" on 2011 album American Tragedy (credited as John Lowery)
- Sixx:A.M. – 2011 – writing credits on "Lies of the Beautiful People" on 2011 album This Is Gonna Hurt
- Sebastian Bach – 2011 – guitarist and composer on former Skid Row front man Sebastian Bach's song "TunnelVision" from Kicking & Screaming
- Alice Cooper – 2011 – solo guitar on "Disco Bloodbath Boogie Fever" on Welcome 2 My Nightmare
- Lynyrd Skynyrd – 2012 – songwriting on Last of a Dyin' Breed
- Steven Adler – 2012 – guest guitarist on the single "Good to Be Bad" on Back from the Dead
- Rod Stewart – 2013 – co-wrote the track "It's Over" on Time
- Hollywood Undead – 2013 Notes from the Underground – guitars on tracks 1, 2, 4, 8
- Sebastian Bach – 2014 – guitarist and composer on former Skid Row front man Sebastian Bach's "Temptation" on Give 'Em Hell
- Tina Guo – 2015 – guitar on "Iron Man" on Cello Metal
- Ace Frehley – 2016 – rhythm guitarist on "Parasite" and "Spanish Castle Magic" on Origins, Vol. 1
- Steve Perry – 2018 – guitarist and co-writer on "Sun Shines Gray" on Traces
- Mötley Crüe – 2019 – co-writer on "The Dirt", "Crash and Burn", and "Ride with the Devil" on The Dirt Soundtrack
- Dolly Parton – 2023 – guitars on "Bygones" on Rockstar (with Rob Halford on vocals and Nikki Sixx on bass)
- Sebastian Bach – 2024 – guitars on "Freedom" on Child Within the Man
- Billy Morrison – 2024 – guitars on "The Ayes Have It" on The Morrison Project
- The Violent Hour – 2025 – guitar solo on "Sick Ones"
- Peter Criss – 2025 – guitars on "Creepy Crawlers", "Justice", and "Rubberneckin'" on Peter Criss
- Tommy Lee – 2026 – guitars on "Stupid World" on Tommyland Rides Again
- Nickelback – 2026 – guitars on "Rattle The Cage"
