= Ginger Fish =

American drummer

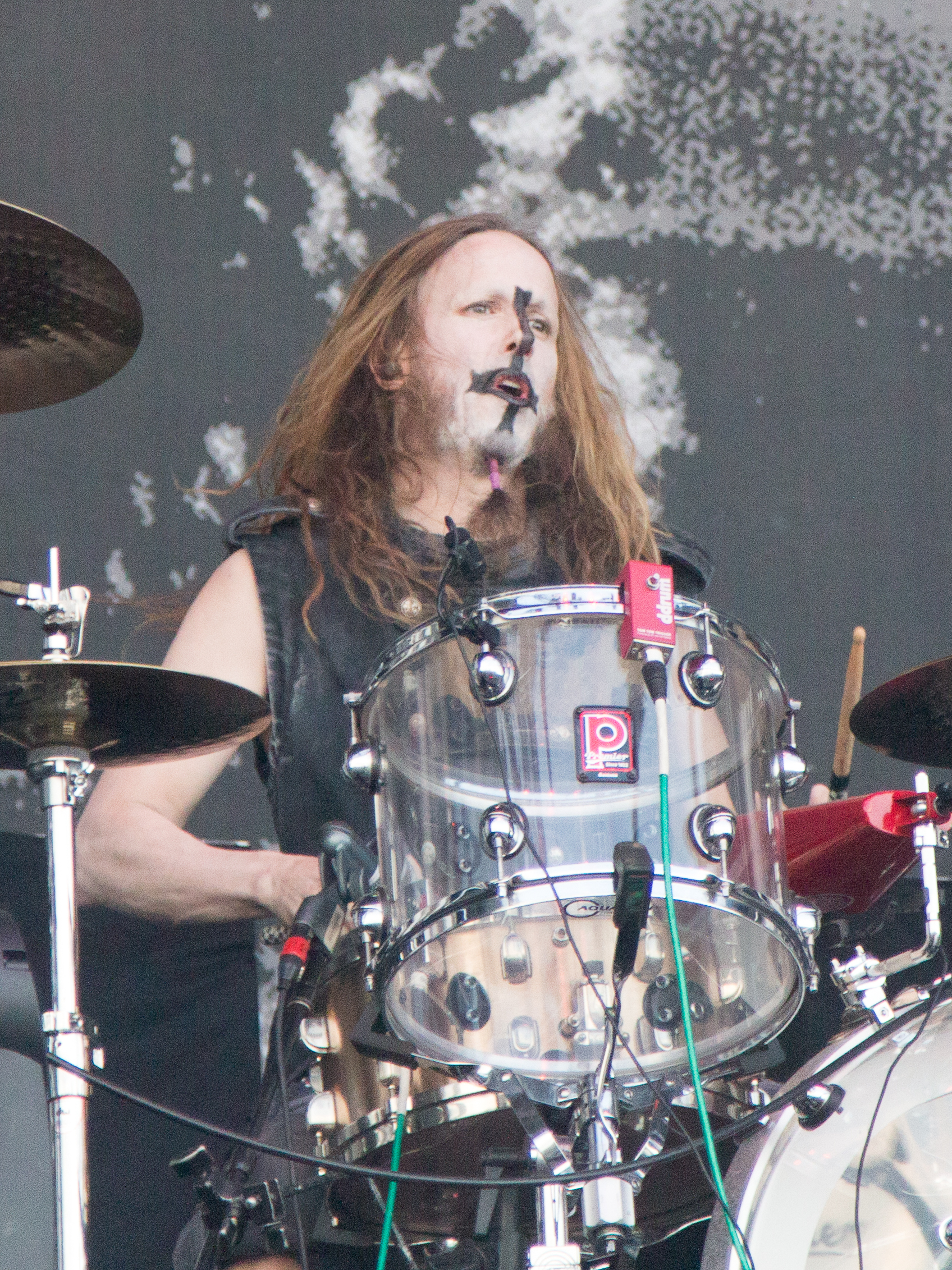
- Fish performing with Rob Zombie in 2014

Background information
- Born: Kenneth Robert Wilson
- Genres: Industrial metal; alternative metal
- Instrument: Drums
- Years active: 1995–present
- Formerly of: Marilyn Manson; Martyr Plot; Rob Zombie
- Website: www.gingerfish.net

Kenneth Robert Wilson, better known by his stage name Ginger Fish, is an American musician best known for playing drums for Marilyn Manson from 1995 to 2011 and has played with Rob Zombie since 2011 . Like Marilyn Manson, which combines the names of an famous beauty with a notorious criminal, his name combines those of Ginger Rogers and Albert Fish.

== Early life ==
Ginger Fish was born Kenneth Robert Wilson. He is a graduate of Chaparral High School in Paradise, Nevada.

== Career ==
Fish is most notable for being the longtime drummer for Marilyn Manson but has played drums for his own band Martyr Plot, and played piano with Powerman 5000 on their album Tonight the Stars Revolt!. In 2011, Fish joined Rob Zombie on drums for the February US Warm up tour dates while regular drummer Joey Jordison was in the UK with his own band the Murderdolls. As Rob Zombie said on his website: "Ginger is helping us out with some warm up gigs before we rejoin with Joey Jordison over in England for our next tour."

Since 2010, Fish has also been doing a number of VJ DJ sets at various clubs around the US.

On February 23, 2011, Fish announced his departure from Marilyn Manson. On April 22, 2011, Fish was announced as the permanent drummer for Rob Zombie He became a drummer for Rob Zombie after joining him on a series of warm up dates in that February, before later departing in 2026.

== Discography ==
Marilyn Manson

- Smells Like Children (1995)
- Antichrist Superstar (1996)
- Mechanical Animals (1998)
- The Last Tour on Earth (1999)
- Holy Wood (In the Shadow of the Valley of Death) (2000)
- The Golden Age of Grotesque (2003)
- The High End of Low (2009)

Rob Zombie

- Venomous Rat Regeneration Vendor (2013)
- Spookshow International: Live (2015)
- The Electric Warlock Acid Witch Satanic Orgy Celebration Dispenser (2016)
- Astro-Creep: 2000 Live (2018)
- The Lunar Injection Kool Aid Eclipse Conspiracy (2021)
- The Great Satan (2026)

== Filmography ==
- Marilyn Manson: Coma White (1999)
- Rob Zombie: Ging Gang Gong De Do Gong De Laga Raga (2015)
- Rob Zombie: The Zombie Horror Picture Show (2014)
