= The Roots of Orchis =

American progressive rock band

The Roots Of Orchis
- Origin: San Francisco, California, U.S.
- Genres: Progressive rock
- Years active: 1997–2010
- Label: Slowdance
- Past members: Justin Pinkerton; Dan Lydersen; Aaron Morgan; Jackie Musick; Chris LaBreche; Katie Logan; Mike Cancel; Kris Bennett
- Website: rootsoforchis.bandcamp.com

The Roots of Orchis was an American progressive rock band from San Francisco, California, on the Slowdance Records label. The band was active from 1997 to 2010.

== Summary ==
Formed by in 1997 by Kris Bennett, Dan Lydersen and Justin Pinkerton. Later adding Aaron Morgan and replacing Bennett with Jackie Musick, The Roots of Orchis released five full-length albums and an EP. Their songs have been included on numerous radio and television programs and they have toured the US extensively. They have shared the stage with such bands as Tortoise (band), Michael Rother & John Frusciante, The Album Leaf, Black Mountain (band), Modest Mouse, Bright Eyes (band) and many others. Chris Labreche was added to the line up for 'The Red House In Winter' and their self-titled EP but left before 'Some Things Plural.' Mike Cancel and Katie Logan briefly replaced Jackie Musick while he was abroad. The band is currently inactive.

== Discography ==
- 'Live at the 25 East E' (1998)(cassette only)
- '... When The Mosquito Stung The Crocodile' (1999)(CD) Slowdance Records
- 'The Red House In Winter (2000)(CD/LP) Slowdance Records
- 'Roots of Orchis' (2002)(CD) Slowdance Records
- 'Some Things Plural' (2002)(CD) Slowdance Records
- 'Crooked Ceilings' (2004)(CD) Slowdance Records (LP) Leap Year Device Records
- 'Empty Lands Ahead and Behind (2010) (Digital Download Only)

== Band members ==
- Dan Lydersen
- Aaron Morgan
- Jackie Musick
- Justin Pinkerton

=== Former members ===
- Kris Bennett
- Chris LaBreche
- Katie Logan
- Mike Cancel
- Rob Dennler
