= Ozzfest: 10th Anniversary =

- Directed by: Wyatt Smith; Tim Van Someren
- Starring: Ozzy Osbourne; Sharon Osbourne
- Music by: A Dozen Furies; Alter Bridge; Anthrax; Black Sabbath; Bowling For Soup; Gizmachi; The Haunted; HIM; It Dies Today; The Mad Capsule Markets; Rob Zombie; Shelter; Soilwork; Trivium; Velvet Revolver; Wicked Wisdom
- Release date: November 22, 2005
- Running time: 150 minutes
- Countries: Camden, New Jersey, United States; Donington Park, Wilson, Leicestershire, England, UK
- Language: English

Ozzfest: 10th Anniversary

Live album
- Released: 2005
- Label: Clear Channel

chronology
Ozzfest 2002 (2002)	Ozzfest: 10th Anniversary (2005)

Ozzfest: 10th Anniversary is a DVD/CD set covering Ozzfest 2005.

== Track listing ==
=== DVD track listing ===
1. Intro
2. "Caught in a Mosh" - Anthrax
3. In the Beginning
4. "A Gunshot to the Head of Trepidation" - Trivium
5. The Ozzfest Tour Machine
6. "Blind Eye Halo" - Soilwork
7. The Early Morning Gig?
8. "Bury Your Dead" - The Haunted
9. The Second Stage
10. "Voice of Sanity" - Gizmachi
11. Rob Zombie on the Second Stage
12. "More Human than Human" - Rob Zombie
13. The Ghosts of Ozzfest
14. Where the &#$@ did Heavy Metal Come In?
15. "You Can't Handle" - Wicked Wisdom
16. "From the Sun?" - Shelter
17. "A Threnody for Modern Romance" - It Dies Today
18. The Original Lunatic
19. "Soul on Fire" - HIM
20. Just to Play?
21. "Awake and Lifeless" - A Dozen Furies
22. A Shot in the Dark
23. "Dragula" - Rob Zombie
24. Look At Us Now
25. "Sucker Train Blues" - Velvet Revolver
26. The Psychometry of Black Sabbath
27. "War Pigs" - Black Sabbath
28. "Iron Man" - Black Sabbath
29. Ozzy Reflections
30. "Paranoid" - Black Sabbath

== CD track listing ==
1. "Caught in a Mosh" - Anthrax (5:22)
2. "A Gunshot to the Head of Trepidation" - Trivium (5:46)
3. "Blind Eye Halo" - Soilwork (2:29)
4. "Bury Your Dead" - The Haunted (3:08)
5. "The End Is Here" - Alter Bridge* (5:28)
6. "Pulse" - The Mad Capsule Markets* (3:29)
7. "More Human than Human" - Rob Zombie (4:09)
8. "1985" - Bowling For Soup* (3:07)
9. "Soul on Fire" - HIM (4:03)
10. "Dragula" - Rob Zombie (3:53)
11. "Sucker Train Blues" - Velvet Revolver (4:42)
12. "War Pigs" - Black Sabbath (7:57)
13. "Iron Man" - Black Sabbath (7:47)
14. "Paranoid" - Black Sabbath (4:38)
- * - Bonus track
