= Instrumental rock =

Type of rock music

- Stylistic origins: Rock; instrumental
- Cultural origins: Mid 1950s and early 1960s, United States

Subgenres
- Post-rock; surf

Other topics
- List of rock instrumentals; List of instrumental bands

Instrumental rock is rock music that emphasizes instrumental performance and features very little or no singing. Examples of instrumental music in rock can be found in practically every subgenre of the style. Instrumental rock was most popular from the mid-1950s to mid-1960s, with artists such as Bill Doggett Combo, The Fireballs, The Shadows, The Ventures, Johnny and the Hurricanes and The Spotnicks. Surf music had many instrumental songs. Many instrumental hits had roots from the R&B genre. The Allman Brothers Band feature several instrumentals. Jeff Beck also recorded two instrumental albums in the 1970s. Progressive rock and art rock performers of the late 1960s and early 1970s did many virtuosic instrumental performances.

During the 1980s and 1990s, the instrumental rock genre was dominated by several guitar soloists, including Joe Satriani, Yngwie Malmsteen and Steve Vai. The 2000s gave way to a new style of instrumental performer. For example, John Lowery (a.k.a. John 5), released a series of solo instrumental albums. The 2000s also saw the rise of instrumental music by bands that have been labeled post-rock.

== Early history ==
Instrumental rock was most popular during rock and roll's first decade (mid-1950s to mid-1960s), before the British Invasion.

One notable early instrumental was "Honky Tonk" by the Bill Doggett Combo, with its slinky beat and sinuous saxophone-organ lead. Jazz musicians who scored pop hits include Earl Bostic and Arnett Cobb. Several rhythm and blues sax players had hit instrumental songs, including Big Jay McNeeley, Red Prysock, and Lee Allen, whose "Walking with Mr. Lee" was quite popular. There were several notable blues instrumental songs during the 1950s; Little Walter's rollicking "Juke" was a #1 R&B hit.

Instrumental hit songs could emphasize electronic organ (the Tornados' "Telstar", Dave "Baby" Cortez's "The Happy Organ", Johnny & the Hurricanes' "Red River Rock"), or the saxophone (the Champs' "Tequila", Bill Black's Combo's "Don't Be Cruel", the Piltdown Men's "McDonald's Cave"), but the guitar was most prominent. Duane Eddy scored several hits (his best known probably being "Rebel-'Rouser"). Eddy was the first rock & roll artist to release an album in stereo.

The Fireballs, featuring the distinctive guitar work of George Tomsco, began their career in the late 1950s with instrumental hits such as "Torquay" and "Bulldog." The band pioneered the guitar/guitar/bass/drums configuration, paving the way for the Ventures, the Shadows, and the surf music scene. The Fireballs were one of a few instrumental bands that successfully transitioned into vocal music, having the biggest hit of 1963 in the US ("Sugar Shack"). B Bumble & the Stingers gained hit "Nut Rocker".

In 1958, Link Wray's "Rumble" proved to be a particularly influential instrumental rock single, with its pioneering combination of distortion, power chords and vibrato inspiring rock musicians including Pete Townshend, Jimmy Page and Iggy Pop. Its suggested resemblance to a street fight saw it banned by many radio stations, yet it went on to sell four million copies.

The Shadows, from the UK, had several hit singles from 1960 onwards, including "Kon-Tiki" and "Apache". The Shadows (alone and accompanying Cliff Richard) featured heavily in the UK charts until 1963 when Beatlemania arrived, combined with DJ indifference to non-vocal singles.

The Ventures' precise guitar work was a major influence on many later rock guitarists; they also helped shape surf music. The band reached chart success with songs such as "Walk-Don't Run" and "Hawaii Five-O". In the U.S. they greatly escalated the guitar instrumentals and use of the vibrato bar on the lead guitar.

Surf music was quite popular in the early 1960s, and was generally rather simple and melodic—one exception being Dick Dale, who gained fame for his quick playing, often influenced by the music of the Middle East, and frequently using exotic scales.

Around the time of the British Invasion, rock changed appreciably, and instrumental hits came mostly from the R&B world. Notable artists include Booker T. & the MG's and saxophonist Junior Walker.

Just before the British Invasion, Lonnie Mack's version of Chuck Berry's "Memphis" reached #5 on the Billboard Pop chart in June 1963. Employing both the blues scale and distortion, it ushered in the era of blues rock guitar of Eric Clapton, Jimi Hendrix and Stevie Ray Vaughan. The early incarnation of Fleetwood Mac with bandleader Peter Green achieved number one chart positions with the guitar-based instrumental "Albatross" in February 1969. Previously, only three other rock guitar instrumentals had cracked Billboard's top five: the Virtues' "Guitar Boogie Shuffle" in 1959, and Duane Eddy's "Because They're Young" and the Ventures' "Walk, Don't Run" in 1960.

In August 1964, Checker Records released the album Two Great Guitars, recorded by rock and roll pioneers Chuck Berry and Bo Diddley, which is one of rock music's first recorded guitar jam sessions.

== 1970s ==
During the 70s, some musicians released instrumental records such as Dennis Coffey's "Scorpio" (1971), Booker T & the MGs' "Melting Pot", Incredible Bongo Band's "Apache", Hot Butter's "Popcorn" (1972) and Rhythm Heritage's "Theme from S.W.A.T." (1976). The Allman Brothers Band is often not considered an instrumental rock band, but they play many instrumentals and include long instrumental passages in longer versions of their songs. One example is the 22-minute version of "Whipping Post" in At Fillmore East LP. Their instrumentals, "In Memory of Elizabeth Reed" and "Jessica" are popular, with "Jessica" being featured as theme for both the 1977 and 2002 formats of Top Gear.

Jeff Beck also recorded two entirely instrumental albums in the 1970s: Blow by Blow and Wired. Successful among mainstream audiences, both have strong jazz influences, the latter featuring a cover of Charles Mingus's jazz standard "Goodbye Pork Pie Hat".

Several progressive rock and art rock performers of the 1960s and 1970s featured virtuosic instrumental performances (and occasional instrumental songs), but many of their compositions also featured vocals. King Crimson gained a large cult following in the late 1960s and 1970s with their explosive instrumental output that merged rock, jazz, classical and heavy metal styles, though their albums also included songs with vocals, Genesis also had multiple instrumental parts in their long songs, and when Peter Gabriel left the band the drummer Phil Collins suggested continuing as an instrumental act, but the other members did not like the idea. Alan Parsons Project had instrumentals on every album, especially on early releases. Tubular Bells by Mike Oldfield, a progressive rock album released in 1973, was all instrumental (save for some brief spoken words) and is one of the best-selling instrumental albums ever, with 16 million copies sold.

Camel's 1975 album The Snow Goose, was entirely instrumental. Many of Pink Floyd's early compositions were largely instrumental pieces containing structured jams fusing psychedelic, progressive and space rock. Frank Zappa was known for intermixing instrumental rock tracks with his novelty songs on his albums.

The jazz rock of the 1970s often had considerable stylistic cross-over with rock with groups such as Colosseum, Soft Machine, Nucleus, Brand X, Chicago, Chase, Blood, Sweat & Tears and Affinity. Surf rock's "2nd Wave" began in the late 1970s with the release of Eddie & the Hot Rods' first single.

== 1980s ==
During the 1980s, the instrumental rock genre was dominated by several guitar soloists. Swedish virtuoso Yngwie Malmsteen made a name for himself in 1984 by playing in the popular band Alcatrazz, and then by releasing his debut solo album Rising Force later that year, reaching #60 on the Billboard Charts. Joe Satriani's 1987 album Surfing With The Alien was a surprise hit, containing the popular instrumental ballad "Always With Me, Always With You", and the blues boogie inflected "Satch Boogie" — both staples for guitarists learning their craft. Satriani released a follow-up album, Flying in a Blue Dream, two years later.

After Malmsteen left Alcatrazz, he was replaced by the extravagant Steve Vai, who had previously been playing with the Frank Zappa band. Continuing the tradition (and following a brief stint in David Lee Roth's band from 1986 to 1988), Vai went on to release a number of solo albums; one of the best-known of these was his 1990 release, Passion and Warfare.

Jason Becker released two albums with Cacophony. Cacophony were a primarily instrumental group featuring Becker and Marty Friedman (the latter of whom went on to play with the thrash metal band Megadeth). After the release of Cacophony's second album Go Off! in 1988, Becker released two solo albums before being diagnosed with ALS. He now uses a wheelchair and is completely unable to play.

Pepeu Gomes, a Brazilian electric guitar player, was considered in 1988 by American magazine Guitar World one of the ten best guitar players in the world. Although he has pure instrumental rock songs with no Brazilian flavour, he mixes the Brazilian rhythms and tunes from well known popular songs, or simply composes by himself using Samba, Choro, Maracatu etc.

== 1990s ==
In 1990, Steve Vai released Passion and Warfare. A fusion of rock, jazz, classical and Eastern tonalities, Passion and Warfare was a technical break-through in regards to what could be achieved in the field of guitar composition. This was followed up by the 1995 trio album Alien Love Secrets and Fire Garden, released a year after.

In 1995, Michael Angelo Batio of Nitro released his CD No Boundaries, which began his solo career. His albums predominantly feature instrumental rock, but have occasionally featured vocals by himself and other vocalists.

During the 1990s, instrumental music flourished among indie-rock groups and with the popularity of post rock groups like Tortoise, Mogwai and Cul de Sac.

Don Caballero gained notice for their instrumental math rock, as did neo-surf-rockers the Mermen and Man or Astro-man?.

Quentin Tarantino's film Pulp Fiction made heavy use of rock instrumentals on its soundtrack, spurring some interest in classic instrumentals, and revitalizing Dick Dale's career.

With the rise of grunge, guitar-orientated instrumental rock of the type popular in the 1980s became less popular, and there were few artists who continued to thrive in that style.

== 2000s ==
There have been many new releases of instrumental rock albums in the 2000s. The majority of the popular performers from the 1980s have made rejuvenated and generally well-received comebacks, with a revitalized sound apparent on their recent releases. Artists such as Steve Morse, Marty Friedman, Paul Gilbert, Ron Jarzombek and Joe Satriani have continued releasing instrumental rock music and touring with success. Les Fradkin has popularized the Beatles' music catalog as guitar-based instrumental rock on the Apple iTunes music download service.

The 2000s gave way for a new style of performer. John Lowery (a.k.a. John 5) released a solo instrumental album after leaving Marilyn Manson in 2003. Vertigo is composed of a fusion of metal, rockabilly, rock and roll, and bluegrass musical styles. The album was a success, and the album after that, Songs for Sanity, which features guest appearances by Steve Vai and Albert Lee, became one of the top selling records on the record label Shrapnel. He followed this in 2007 with The Devil Knows My Name, which features Joe Satriani, Jim Root, and Eric Johnson.

The 2000s saw a rise in the popularity of bands that have been labeled post-rock; many of these bands have created instrumental rock songs. Constellation Records has released some of the best-known examples of instrumental post-rock, such as Godspeed You! Black Emperor and Do Make Say Think. Other examples include Austin TV, Mogwai, The Cancer Conspiracy, the Mercury Program, The Fierce and the Dead, 65daysofstatic, God Is An Astronaut, Russian Circles and Explosions in the Sky.

Within the indie rock label, bands such as Ratatat and Delicate Steve are popular instrumental rock acts.

Guitarist Omar Rodriguez Lopez's solo albums typically are instrumental (Old Money) or mostly instrumental (Se Dice Bisonte, No Bufalo).

In the late 2000s a new style of heavy metal called djent emerged. Some of the leading bands in the scene such as Animals as Leaders and Arch Echo are instrumental acts, while many others started as instrumental acts before later acquiring vocalists.

Guitarist Matt Stevens made 4 albums of instrumental rock between 2008-2014, up to Lucid, released on Esoteric Recordings which featured Pat Mastelotto of King Crimson and Jem Godfrey of Frost*.

A number of Math Rock artists, such as Toe, mainly use instrumentals in their music without many vocals and are thus instrumental acts.

== See also ==
- List of instrumental bands
- List of rock instrumentals
- Rautalanka
- Pipeline Instrumental Review
