= Gareth Philips =

Television producter

- Occupation: Television producer
- Years active: 1996–present
- Notable work: Coronation Street, Britannia High, Hollyoaks, Fair City, Red Rock

Gareth Philips is a television producer.

== Career ==
=== Radio and television presenter ===
Philips began his career working on Radio Clatterbridge between 1995 and 1997. He moved on to work at other radio stations including MFM 97.1, before becoming a television presenter on the cable TV stations Liverpool Live and Channel One. From there he became a researcher for Granada Television in 1998, working on You've Been Framed, Stars in Their Eyes and Soap Fever.

=== Coronation Street ===
Between 2000 and 2002, Philips was a storyline writer for ITV soap opera Coronation Street. From 2002 until 2004, he worked as script editor, then in 2004 he was promoted to assistant producer, overseeing the entire script and story team until the end of 2006. Philips is regarded as being integral to the success of the show during one of its golden periods, in which it won three successive BAFTA awards for Best Continuing Drama. During that time he also produced the Coronation Street Christmas Pantomime in 2005.

=== Britannia High ===
Philips' next television credit was script editor for the drama series Cold Blood in 2007 and 2008. Also in 2008, he developed and produced the hit musical drama Britannia High. The series focused on the lives of a group of teenagers at a fictional London theatre school. It aired on ITV1 and TV3 Ireland, premiering on 26 October 2008. Philips hired Coronation Street writers Jonathan Harvey, Damon Rochefort and Julie Jones to help develop the characters and storylines, as well as writing partners Kirstie Falkous and John Regier.

Britannia High starred Sapphire Elia, Georgina Hagen, Mitch Hewer, Rana Roy, Matthew James Thomas and Marcquelle Ward, as well as Adam Garcia as the dance mentor, Lorraine Pilkington as the music mentor and Mark Benton as the school principal and acting mentor. The series featured cameo performances from Girls Aloud, Boyzone, Matt Willis and Gemma Bissix. Aston Merrygold, lead singer of hit boyband JLS, auditioned for the role before his success in the boyband - but only made it to the final 16. Pixie Lott also auditioned, but failed to be selected. The show featured an original soundtrack which was created by a team of pop producers and writers in the UK, led by Take That member Gary Barlow.

=== Hollyoaks ===
Philips was asked by show executives to join Hollyoaks in late 2010 to help troubleshoot a production crisis. Soon it was announced that Hollyoaks series producer Paul Marquess would leave his position to be replaced by Philips. Discussing his promotion, Philips stated: "I have really enjoyed working in the script team at Hollyoaks and it will be a huge honour to take the reins of Channel 4's flagship youth drama. I am very excited about taking the show even further this year with more compelling and brave stories." Philips achieved enormous success with the conclusions of the Riley/Mercedes/Carl triangle and the Silas serial killer storyline, which gained the show its highest ratings for three years on Channel 4, including three million views per month on catch up service 4OD, as well as providing E4 with some of its highest ever figures.

=== Fair City ===
In spring 2012, Philips was hired by Irish broadcaster RTÉ to work as a consultant on their flagship soap opera, Fair City. He brought a new ambition to the show to tell bigger and more powerful stories, like Paddy Bishop's reign of terror, Yvonne Doyle's date rape hell, the mental breakdown of Tommy Dillon, and Niamh Cassidy's explosive affair. He also introduced more dynamic and more younger characters which brought a new energy to the programme. The combination of stronger stories and characters resulted in huge audience increases year on year. Philips was also the mastermind behind Fair City's 25th anniversary episodes which were broadcast in September 2014 and were regarded as some of the show's most ambitious, accomplished and successful to date.

=== Red Rock ===
Philips' current position is executive producer of TV3 (Ireland)'s new continuing drama, Red Rock. The show launched in January 2015 as a co-production of Element Pictures and Company Pictures. It features a combination of self-contained and ongoing serial storylines, and revolves around a local Dublin Garda station. Filming began in Dublin on Monday, November 3, 2014.

Media offices
Preceded by Paul Marquess	Series producer of Hollyoaks; 2011	Succeeded by Emma Smithwick
