= Georgina Hagen =

British actress and singer

- Born: Georgina Kimberley Hagen; Hampshire, England
- Education: Sylvia Young Theatre School
- Occupations: Actress; singer
- Musical career
- Genres: Musical theatre

Georgina Kimberley Hagen is an English actress and singer. She is best known for her roles as Rebecca Chalmers in the CBBC series The Story of Tracy Beaker (2005) and as Lauren Waters in the ITV musical series Britannia High (2008). She has also performed in a number of West End musicals.

== Life and career ==
As a child, Hagen starred in a number of West end musicals, including Chitty Chitty Bang Bang at the London Palladium and as the voice of Control in the 2004–2013 UK tour of Starlight Express - The 3rd Dimension, on which her father, Peter Hagen, was musical director. Her mother is actress Susie Fenwick who has appeared in many West End productions. She was heard alongside actors such as Oliver Thornton and Tim Driesen. She studied at the Sylvia Young Theatre School in London.

Hagen starred in Britannia High as Lauren Waters alongside Mitch Hewer, Sapphire Elia, Matthew James Thomas, Rana Roy, Marcquelle Ward, Sophie Powles and Adam Garcia. She went through a year-long audition process which involved dance, drama and singing workshops.

Hagen has starred as Meat in the 2009/2010 UK tour of Queen musical We Will Rock You'', and played the lead role of Pearl in Starlight Express in Bochum, Germany until May 25, 2014. She featured in Tim Minchin's new Musical 'Groundhog Day', in which she originated the role of Nancy Taylor.

Hagen is the second cousin of Perry Fenwick, who plays Billy Mitchell in EastEnders.

== Filmography ==
Year	Title	Role	Notes
2001	Magic Grandad	Nikki	TV series (3 episodes)
2005	The Story of Tracy Beaker	Rebecca Chalmers	TV series (series 5)
2008	Britannia High	Lauren Waters	TV series (9 episodes)

== Theatre ==
Year	Title	Role	Notes
1998	Annie	Kate / Molly	Victoria Palace Theatre
2002	Chitty Chitty Bang Bang	Sewer Child	London Palladium
2004–2013	Starlight Express - The 3rd Dimension	Control (voice)	UK Tour
2009	We Will Rock You	Meat	UK Tour
2010	Starlight Express	Dinah the Dining Car	Bochum, Germany
2011	Starlight Express	Pearl the Observation Car	Bochum, Germany
2014	Evita	Mistress	Ljubljana Summer Festival
2015	Bat Boy: The Musical	Shelley Parker	Southwark Playhouse
2015	Like Me	Ashley	Waterloo East Theatre, London
2015	Judy - The Songbook of Judy Garland	Herself	UK Tour
2016	Groundhog Day	Nancy Taylor	The Old Vic
2018	Starlight Express	Pearl	Bochum, Germany
2020	The Sound of Music	Sister Margaretta	Tallinn, Estonia
2021	Heathers: The Musical	Ms Fleming / Veronica’s Mum	UK Tour
2022	But I'm a Cheerleader: The Musical	Mary Brown	Turbine Theatre, London
2023	Disney100: The Concert	Vocalist	UK and Europe arena tour
2024	Everybody's Talking About Jamie	Alternate Margaret / Understudy Ray / Miss Hedge	Also resident director, UK Tour
