= Blue box (disambiguation) =

Blue box is an early phreaking tool that simulates a telephone operator's dialing console.

Blue box may also refer to:

== Technology ==
- Link Trainer or Blue Box, a flight simulator
- Blue Box, a Mac OS 8 emulation layer from the Rhapsody OS which became the Mac OS X Classic Environment
- MXR Blue Box, an octave effect for electric guitars
- Nickname of Hessdalen AMS, as it uses a blue container

== Entertainment ==
- TARDIS, or "the blue box", a time machine and spacecraft in the British TV series Doctor Who
- Blue Box (novel), a Doctor Who novel by Kate Orman
- Blue Box (album), a 1996 album by Kate Ceberano
- Blue Box (manga), a manga series by Kouji Miura
- Bluebox Limited, a film production company
- Blue Box, a documentary by Michal Weits (2021) about land acquisition in Palestine by the JNF, before and after the creation of the State of Israel

== Other uses ==
- Blue Box, common name for the tree species Eucalyptus baueriana and Eucalyptus magnificata
- Blue box (WTO agreement), a subsidy category of the World Trade Organization
- Blue box recycling system, initially a waste management system used by Canadian municipalities
- A nickname for Kraft Dinner packaged stovetop macaroni and cheese
- A British police box
- A term for Handcuff covers
- A severe thunderstorm watch, in meteorology
- JNF collection boxes, Jewish National Fund blue charity collection boxes
- Blue Box, a gift given with each purchase made at Tiffany and Co.
