= University Heights =

University Heights may refer to:

== Places ==
=== United States ===
Towns or cities

- University Heights, Iowa
- University Heights, Ohio

Neighborhoods

- University Heights, Albany, New York
- University Heights, Austin, Texas
- University Heights, Bronx, New York
- University Heights, Buffalo, New York
- University Heights, Cincinnati, Ohio
- University Heights, Gainesville, Florida
- University Heights, Indianapolis, Indiana
- University Heights, Minot, North Dakota
- University Heights, Newark, New Jersey
- University Heights, San Bernardino, California
- University Heights, San Diego, California
- University Heights, Virginia, near Charlottesville, Virginia
- University Heights (Washington, D.C.)

Transportation

- The University Heights Bridge, connecting University Heights and Manhattan

College campuses once known as "University Heights"

- Busch Campus (Rutgers University) in New Jersey
- The defunct Bronx campus of New York University, now belonging to Bronx Community College

Places listed on the National Register of Historic Places

- University Heights apartments (Tucson, Arizona)
- University Heights Historic District (Madison, Wisconsin)
- University Heights School (Seattle), King County, Washington
- University Heights Subdivision Number One, St. Louis County, Missouri

=== Canada ===
Neighborhoods

- University Heights, Calgary, Alberta
- University Heights Development Area, Saskatoon, Saskatchewan
- University Heights Suburban Centre, Saskatoon, Saskatchewan
- University Heights, Toronto, Ontario

=== China ===
Neighborhoods

- University Heights, Hong Kong
- University Heights, Kotewall Road, Hong Kong

== Other uses ==
- University Heights (film)
