= Chloe Bridges =

American actress (born 1991)

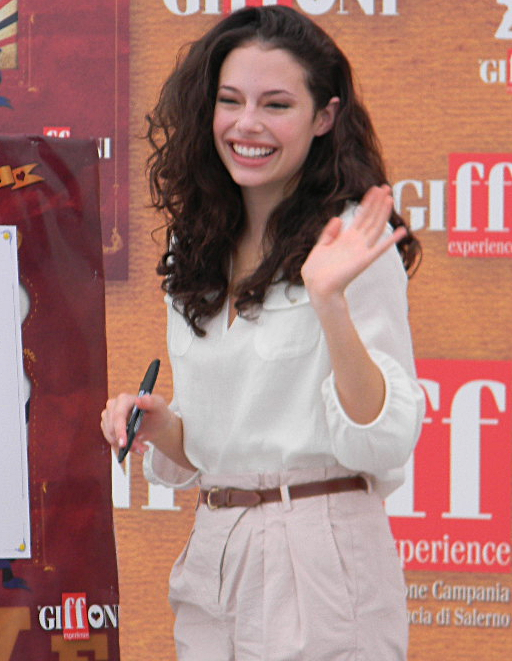
- Bridges in July 2010
- Born: Chloe Marisa Suazo; December 27, 1991 (age 34); Thibodaux, Louisiana, U.S.
- Education: Columbia University (BA)
- Occupation: Actress
- Years active: 2005–present
- Spouse: Adam DeVine (m. 2021)
- Children: 1

Chloe Marisa Suazo DeVine (born December 27, 1991), known professionally as Chloe Bridges, is an American actress. She is known for her roles as Zoey Moreno in the sitcom Freddie (2005–2006) and as Dana Turner in the Disney Channel original film Camp Rock 2: The Final Jam (2010). She has starred in the films Forget Me Not (2009), Family Weekend (2013), Mantervention (2014), The Final Girls (2015), and Nightlight (2015). She has also portrayed Donna LaDonna in The Carrie Diaries, Sydney in Pretty Little Liars, and Kibby in Daytime Divas. Born in Thibodaux, Louisiana, she was raised in nearby Houma.

== Career ==
From 2005 until 2006, Bridges portrayed the role of Zoey Moreno in the ABC sitcom Freddie, starring alongside Freddie Prinze Jr. For this role, she was credited under her birth name, Chloe Suazo. In 2006, she guest-starred as the character in an episode of George Lopez. She has appeared in commercials for Adelphia and AT&T.

Bridges appeared in the 2009 films Legally Blondes and Forget Me Not. She secured the role of Dana Turner in the sequel, Camp Rock 2: The Final Jam, which aired on Disney Channel in 2010. In March 2012, Bridges was cast as Donna LaDonna in The CW's Sex and the City prequel, titled The Carrie Diaries, which aired from 2013 to 2014 over two seasons.

In April 2014, she landed a recurring role in the fifth season of the ABC Family teen drama series Pretty Little Liars as Sydney Driscoll, the newest member of the swim team, who befriends Emily (Shay Mitchell). Bridges portrayed the supporting role of Paula in the horror comedy film The Final Girls (2015), and starred as Nia in the supernatural thriller film Nightlight (2015). The film, directed by Scott Beck and Bryan Woods, was released on March 27, 2015. In August 2016, Bridges was cast as Kibby, a former child star and recovering addict, in VH1's scripted drama series Daytime Divas, which premiered on June 5, 2017.

In 2018, Bridges starred as recurring role of Roxy Buckley in the American dark-comedy television web series, Insatiable.

== Personal life ==
She attended John Muir Middle School and Burbank High School when her family moved to Los Angeles.

Bridges graduated from Columbia University with a Bachelor of Arts degree in political science in 2020.

After meeting on the set of The Final Girls in 2014, Bridges began dating Adam DeVine in February 2015. In October 2019, the couple announced their engagement. The couple were married on October 9, 2021.

On October 2, 2023, the couple announced on Instagram that they were expecting their first child. Their son Beau Devine was born on February 16, 2024.

== Filmography ==
=== Film ===
Year	Title	Role	Notes
2007	The Longshots	Tammy Anderson	
2009	Legally Blondes	Ashley Meadows	Direct-to-video
2009	Forget Me Not	Layla	
2010	Camp Rock 2: The Final Jam	Dana Turner	
2013	Family Weekend	Kat	
2014	Mantervention	Katie	
2015	The Final Girls	Paula	
2015	Nightlight	Nia	
2016	Mike and Dave Need Wedding Dates	Apartment Chloe	
2018	Little Bitches	Brooke	
2018	Game Over, Man!	Diana	
2019	Airplane Mode	Jenna	
2020	Browse	Veronica	
TBA	Miles	Nicki	In post-production

=== Television ===
Year	Title	Role	Notes
2005–2006	Freddie	Zoey Moreno	Main role; 21 episodes Credited as Chloe Suazo
2006	George Lopez	Zoey Moreno	Episode: "George Gets Cross Over Freddie"; Credited as Chloe Suazo
2008	Out of Jimmy's Head	Undine	Episode: "Bad Fad"
2011	Worst. Prom. Ever.	Neve Spernak	Television film
2011	90210	Alexis	3 episodes
2011	Suburgatory	Misty	Episode: "Halloween"
2012	New Girl	Chloe	Episode: "Kids"
2013–2014	The Carrie Diaries	Donna LaDonna	Main role; 22 episodes
2013	Social Nightmare	Emily Hargroves	Television film
2014–2017	Pretty Little Liars	Sydney Driscoll	10 episodes
2015	Rizzoli & Isles	Tory Garrett	Episode: "Nice to Meet You, Dr. Isles"
2015–2016	Faking It	Zita Cruz	5 episodes
2016	The Grinder	Calista	Episode: "For the People"
2017	Daytime Divas	Kibby Ainsley	Main role; 10 episodes
2018–2019	Insatiable	Roxy	5 episodes
2019	Charmed	Tessa	2 episodes
2019	The Rookie	Stephanie Davis	Episode: "Clean Cut"
2020	Punk'd	Herself	Episode: "Wrecking Ball with Adam Devine"
2020	Schooled	Paloma	2 episodes
2021	Love, for Real	Hayley	Television film
2022	Maggie	Jessie	Main role
2022	The Righteous Gemstones	Meagan	2 episodes

=== Music videos ===
Year	Title	Artist(s)
2009	"Remember December"	Demi Lovato
2010	"It's On"	Cast of Camp Rock 2: The Final Jam
2017	"My Name Is Human"	Highly Suspect

=== Video games ===
Year	Title	Role	Notes
2006	Desperate Housewives: The Game	Danielle Van de Kamp	Voice
