= Mitch Hewer =

English actor (born 1989)

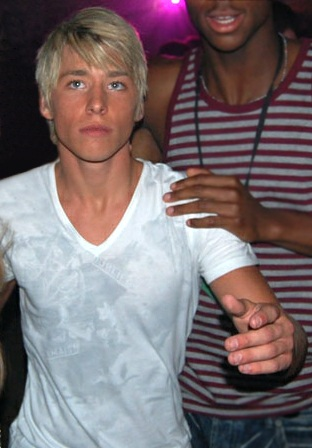
- Hewer in 2007
- Born: Mitchell Scott Hewer; 1 July 1989 (age 37); Bristol, England
- Education: South West Academy of Dramatic Arts
- Occupation: Actor
- Years active: 2006–present

Mitchell Scott Hewer (born 1 July 1989) is an English actor, best known for the role of Maxxie Oliver in the E4 teen drama Skins. He has also starred in Britannia High as the all-round talent Danny Miller.

== Career ==
In 2006, Hewer was cast as Maxxie Oliver in the teen drama, Skins. He appeared on the cover of the March and October 2007 issues of gay magazine Attitude, as part of a "Gays on TV" feature which included stars from Skins, Hollyoaks, Coronation Street and Shameless. He also appeared nude in the June 2008 issue of Cosmopolitan in aid of testicular cancer research.

Hewer starred in the music drama Britannia High, in the role of Danny Miller. He also appears on the Britannia High soundtrack. He also appeared on the popular ITV and ITV2 shows Xtra Factor, This Morning, Richard and Judy's New Position and on the BBC comedy show Never Mind the Buzzcocks alongside team captain Davina McCall and singer Alesha Dixon.

In December 2009, Hewer appeared in the musical Never Forget, based on the songs of boyband Take That. He played stripper Dirty Harry alongside Michelle Collins. The show took place at Fairfield Halls in Croydon, London.

In 2014, he appeared as Ben in Nightlight and as Steven Stevens in Behaving Badly, the film adaptation of Ric Browde's novel While I'm Dead Feed the Dog.

Hewer joined the cast of Casualty as Mickey Ellisson in 2017.

== Personal life ==
Born in Bristol, Hewer trained at South West Academy of Dramatic Arts. He appeared in the music video "The Club" by Lisa Morgan. He has a sister named Samantha and he has a daughter named Aria Isabella.

== Filmography ==
=== Television ===
Year	Title	Role	Notes
2007–2008	Skins	Maxxie Oliver	Lead role (17 episodes)
2008	Britannia High	Danny Miller	Lead role (9 episodes)
2017	Casualty	Mickey Ellisson	Recurring role (9 episodes)

=== Film ===
Year	Title	Role
2014	Behaving Badly	Steven Stevens
2015	Nightlight	Ben
2023	Everyone	Rob
