= Proud (Britannia High song) =

Single by Wayne Hector, Steve Mac and Andy Hill featuring The cast of Britannia High

from the album Britannia High Soundtrack
- Released: 2008
- Recorded: 2008
- Genre: Pop
- Length: 3:28
- Label: Sony Music
- Songwriters: Wayne Hector; Steve Mac; Andy Hill
- Producer: Steve Mac

"Proud" is a song by Wayne Hector, Steve Mac and Andy Hill originally written and recorded for the British television drama series Britannia High. The song was later covered by Scottish singer Susan Boyle for her debut album I Dreamed a Dream.

In the ITV drama series the song is performed in episode 1.03 by the character Jez Tyler played by Matthew James Thomas. The song features on the 2008 Britannia High soundtrack album.

== Writing and inspiration ==
The song was written specifically for the Britannia High television programme. The original inspiration was a teenager talking to a father that doesn't understand him. In an interview with HitQuarters Hector recounts how the writers composed the lyrics:

"We drew on the things that we felt about our own relationships with our dads when we were younger. I've got a good relationship with my dad now but, as is usual, when you're a teenager and the whole world is against you … I mean, not everybody has a tense relationship, but both of us did."

== Susan Boyle version ==
"Proud"

Song by Susan Boyle

from the album I Dreamed a Dream
- Recorded: July–September 2009 (London, England)
- Genre: Vocal pop
- Length: 3:20
- Label: Syco; Columbia Records
- Songwriters: Wayne Hector; Steve Mac
- Producer: Steve Mac

"Proud" was covered by Scottish singer Susan Boyle for her debut 2009 album I Dreamed a Dream.

Despite being originally written about teenage-parent conflict, the song arguably found greater resonance when Boyle reinterpreted the song to suit her own real life feelings.
