= Behaving Badly (film) =

2014 film by Tim Garrick

- Theatrical release poster
- Directed by: Tim Garrick
- Screenplay by: Tim Garrick; Scott Russell
- Based on: While I'm Dead Feed the Dog by Ric Browde
- Produced by: Andrew Lazar; Miri Yoon
- Starring: Nat Wolff; Selena Gomez; Mary-Louise Parker; Elisabeth Shue; Dylan McDermott; Jason Lee; Heather Graham; Jennifer R. Blake; Cary Elwes; Patrick Warburton
- Cinematography: Mathew Rudenberg
- Edited by: Matt Friedman
- Music by: David Newman
- Production companies: Mad Chance; Starboard Entertainment
- Distributed by: Vertical Entertainment
- Release date: August 1, 2014
- Running time: 96 minutes
- Country: United States
- Language: English
- Box office: $422,697

Behaving Badly is a 2014 American teen sex comedy film written and directed by Tim Garrick, based on the autobiographical novel While I'm Dead Feed the Dog by Ric Browde. It stars Nat Wolff and Selena Gomez alongside Mary-Louise Parker, Elisabeth Shue, Heather Graham, Jason Lee, Dylan McDermott and Cary Elwes. The movie was released on video-on-demand on July 1, 2014, before a theatrical release on August 1, 2014.

== Plot ==
Teenager Rick Stevens (Nat Wolff), has a crush on Nina Pennington (Selena Gomez). When Rick realizes that Nina broke up with her boyfriend Kevin Carpenter (Austin Stowell) he makes his move. He places a bet with Karlis Malinauskas (Nate Hartley), a mobster's son, that he will have sex with Nina before Arbor Day, leading to a serious chain of events from having sex with his best friend's mom (Elisabeth Shue), to having almost the whole town in jail, including Nina.

== Cast ==
- Nat Wolff as Rick Stevens
- Selena Gomez as Nina Pennington
- Mary-Louise Parker as Lucy Stevens/Saint Lola
- Elisabeth Shue as Pamela Bender
- Dylan McDermott as Jimmy Leach
- Lachlan Buchanan as Billy Bender
- Heather Graham as Annette Stratton-Osborne
- Ashley Rickards as Kristen Stevens
- Jason Lee as Father Krumins
- Austin Stowell as Kevin Carpenter
- Cary Elwes as Joseph Stevens
- Patrick Warburton as Principal Basil Poole
- Jennifer R. Blake as Janice
- Gary Busey as Chief Howard D. Lansing
- Jason Acuña as Brian Savage
- Rusty Joiner as Keith Bender
- Nate Hartley as Karlis Malinauskas
- Mitch Hewer as Steven Stevens
- Scott Evans as Ronnie Watt
- Gil McKinney as Officer Joe Tackett
- Mindy Robinson as Kristen's Friend
- Justin Bieber as Prisoner (cameo)

== Production ==
Principal photography took place at John Burroughs Middle School in Los Angeles, California in August 2012. The shoot took twenty days to complete. Originally titled Feed The Dog since it is based on the book While I'm Dead Feed the Dog, the film changed its name in August 2012 to Parental Guidance Suggested before being revised to Behaving Badly. The third title revision was largely due to the Billy Crystal/Bette Midler film Parental Guidance in the 2012 holiday season having already claimed the title, causing possible confusion. Browde, the author of the original autobiographical novel, has disavowed the film as going against the source material of his book.

== Release and reception ==
In April 2014, it was announced Vertical Entertainment had acquired U.S distribution rights to the film. The film was released in the United Kingdom straight to video on June 9, 2014. The film was released in the United States on July 1, 2014, through video on demand, before being released in a limited release on August 1, 2014.

The film received a 0% approval rating with an average rating of 3/10 on Rotten Tomatoes, based on 14 reviews. It holds a score of 18/100 on Metacritic based on 7 reviews, indicating "overwhelming dislike."
