= Concord Youth Theatre =

American community theatre organization in Concord, Massachusetts

Concord Youth Theatre (CYT) is a community theater organization based in Concord, Massachusetts.

Founded in 1976 by Kay DeFord, the non-profit theater company focuses on youth education and productions. In October 2019, actor Chris Evans helped CYT secure a permanent location for its theatre, rehearsal space, and classes.

== Notable alumni ==
Notable alumni of Concord Youth Theatre productions and classes include:

- Chris Evans, actor
- Scott Evans, actor
- Xander Singh, musician and member of Passion Pit
- Alexandra Socha, Broadway performer
