= Impulse (2010 film) =

- Directed by: Scott Beck; Bryan Woods
- Written by: Scott Beck; Bryan Woods
- Produced by: Christy Sullivan; Darren Brandl; Scott Beck; Bryan Woods
- Starring: Chris Masterson
- Cinematography: Andrew M. Davis
- Edited by: Russell Andrew
- Music by: Corey Wallace
- Production company: Bluebox Limited Films
- Distributed by: Shorts International
- Release dates: July 29, 2010 (LA Shorts Fest); October 27, 2011 (iTunes)
- Running time: 20 minutes
- Country: United States
- Language: English

Impulse is a 2010 American suspense thriller short film written, produced, and directed by Scott Beck and Bryan Woods. The film is about the last day on Earth as deadly events unfold around a man (Chris Masterson) racing to his final and most significant act. The film made its debut on the closing night of the 2010 LA Shorts Fest. Impulse was picked up for distribution by Shorts International.

== Production ==
The film was produced by Bluebox Limited Films and shot in Perry, Iowa in November 2009. Post-production was completed at Skywalker Sound and Company 3.
