= Nightlight (2015 film) =

- Theatrical release poster
- Directed by: Scott Beck; Bryan Woods
- Written by: Scott Beck; Bryan Woods
- Produced by: Norton Herrick; Michael London; Darren Brandl; Janice Williams
- Starring: Shelby Young; Chloe Bridges; Mitch Hewer; Taylor Murphy; Carter Jenkins
- Cinematography: Andrew M. Davis
- Edited by: Russell Andrew
- Production company: Herrick Entertainment
- Distributed by: Lionsgate
- Release date: March 27, 2015 (United States)
- Running time: 85 minutes
- Country: United States
- Language: English
- Box office: $77,567

Nightlight is a 2015 American found footage supernatural horror film written and directed by Scott Beck and Bryan Woods. The film stars Shelby Young, Chloe Bridges, Mitch Hewer, Taylor Murphy, and Carter Jenkins. It received generally negative reviews from critics.

== Plot ==
Five teens, Robin, Ben, Chris, Amelia, and Nia are out in the woods the day after Robin's friend, Ethan, committed suicide when Robin lied to avoid going to prom with him, causing him to kill himself in the woods, where it's rumored that those who died have never been found.

While playing the game nightlight, the teens start hearing strange noises and try to leave, but are stopped through unseen forces. Robin later learns through Nia's video camera and confession from Nia herself that the four of them invited her out to scare her during the game.

The teens are repeatedly separated and lost. Robin concludes that the soul of her deceased friend Ethan wants revenge for lying to him and believes she is the reason he killed himself.

One by one, Robin and the other teens are then picked off until Robin is the only left standing. She tries to reason with Ethan, as well as beg for his forgiveness. Robin is then locked inside the church and possessed. She kills Nia before walking to a cliff and jumping. As the camera pans out from Robin's body the other teens are seen as well. Ethan's flashlight can also finally be seen. There is a short scene with Ethan's suicide note though no real reason is given.

== Cast ==
- Shelby Young as Robin
- Chloe Bridges as Nia
- Carter Jenkins as Chris
- Mitch Hewer as Ben
- Taylor Murphy as Amelia
- Kyle Fain as Ethan

== Production ==
Production on the film began on May 15, 2012, in Utah.

== Release ==
In July 2014, it was announced that Lionsgate had acquired distribution rights to the film and planned a 2015 limited release and video on demand run for the film, and that Lionsgate was partnering with The Film Arcade on the theatrical release. The film was released in the United States in a limited release and through video on demand beginning on March 27, 2015.

== Reception ==
The film was met with negative reviews. On Rotten Tomatoes it holds a rating of 14% based on 7 reviews with an average rating of 3.6/10.

== Home media ==
The film was released on DVD courtesy of Lionsgate Home Entertainment on May 26, 2015 in the United States.
