= Daytime Divas =

2017 American satirical comedy-drama television series

- Genre: Comedy drama; Satire
- Based on: Satan's Sisters by Star Jones
- Developed by: Amy and Wendy Engelberg
- Starring: Vanessa Williams; Chloe Bridges; Camille Guaty; Fiona Gubelmann; McKinley Freeman
- Composer: Scott Starrett
- Country of origin: United States
- Original language: English
- No. of seasons: 1
- No. of episodes: 10

Production
- Executive producers: Star Jones; Josh Berman; Chris Alberghini; Mike Chessler; Amy Engelberg; Wendy Engelberg; Suzanne DePasse; Madison Jones; Susan Levison
- Production locations: Atlanta, Georgia
- Camera setup: Single-camera
- Running time: 40 minutes
- Production companies: Osprey Productions; De Passe Jones Entertainment; Sony Pictures Television

Original release
- Network: VH1
- Release: June 5 – July 31, 2017

Daytime Divas is an American satirical comedy-drama television series developed by Amy and Wendy Engelberg for VH1. It is based on the 2011 book Satan's Sisters by former co-host of The View Star Jones. The show stars Vanessa Williams, Chloe Bridges, Camille Guaty, Fiona Gubelmann, and McKinley Freeman. Principal photography began in August 2016 in Atlanta, Georgia. The series premiered on June 5, 2017. On November 1, 2017, VH1 cancelled the series after one season.

== Premise ==
Maxine is the creator and lead host of the popular daytime television talk show The Lunch Hour, which also includes co-hosts Mo, Kibby, Nina, and Heather. On-air, they are great friends, but behind the scenes, they live in a world of power struggles and super-egos. Meanwhile, Maxine's former assistant, Anna, returns as the hard investigative journalist working for a great magazine, who wants to expose the truth about Maxine.

== Cast and characters ==
=== Main ===
- Vanessa Williams as Maxine Robinson, the creator and lead host of the daytime television show The Lunch Hour. She is one of the greatest personalities on American television and mother of Shawn
- Chloe Bridges as Kibby Ainsley, a former child star and recovering addict who is one of the co-hosts
- Camille Guaty as Nina Sandoval, a Pulitzer Prize-winning investigative journalist and one of the co-hosts
- Fiona Gubelmann as Heather Flynn-Kellogg, an outspoken conservative and one of the co-hosts
- McKinley Freeman as Shawn Robinson, the producer of The Lunch Hour and Maxine's adopted son

=== Recurring ===
- Tichina Arnold (credited as a "special guest star") as Mo Evans, an eccentric comedienne and one of the show's co-hosts
- Niko Pepaj as Leon, an ambitious head production assistant
- Sarah Mack as Ramona Davies, a production assistant
- Tammy Blanchard as Sheree Ainsley, Kibby's scheming mother
- Ness Bautista as Andrew Weller, Nina's husband and a rising politician
- Rich McDonald as Brad Kellogg, Heather's husband and a race car driver
- Adam J. Harrington as Jason Abel, a network president
- Norm Lewis as William Tomas, the doorman at Maxine's co-op building, who knows some of her darkest secrets
- Kristen Johnston as Anna Crouse, Maxine's former assistant and current editor-in-chief of a great magazine, who wants to expose the truth about the behind the scenes of The Lunch Hour
- Cassady McClincy as Tandy Ainsley, Kibby's younger sister
- Scott Evans as Julian, a celebrity sober coach who helps Kibby keep her life on track

=== Guest ===
- Tamera Mowry-Housley as herself
- Kelly Osbourne as herself
- Tasha Smith as Portia Camden, a popular lifestyle guru and the ladies' counselor who is brought on to guest host
- Debby Ryan as Maddie Finn, Kibby's rival and former Lacey from Outer Spacey co-star, who wants to ruin Kibby's life
- La La Anthony as Isabel Carlisle, a crisis management expert hired by Maxine to help handle a situation in behind the scenes
- Joy Behar as herself
- Sunny Hostin as herself
- Jedediah Bila as herself
- Sara Haines as herself
- Eve as Cecile James, a bestselling author of books about alpha women who guest hosts, and who initially wants to become a permanent co-host
- Richard T. Jones as Ben Branson, a charismatic real estate mogul who is set up on a blind date with Maxine
- Patti LaBelle as Gloria Tomas, the mother of William, who also has secrets
- Janet Mock as herself, who appears as a guest host on the show
- Jillian Rose Reed as Kali Z, a millennial YouTuber brought on as a guest host
- Rob Estes as Vance Gordon, an actor and Kibby's former Lacey from Outer Spacey co-star
- Star Jones as herself
- Ashley Graham as herself, who appears as a guest host on the show
- Zeeko Zaki as Cab Driver

== Episodes ==
No.	Title	Directed by	Written by	Original release date	US viewers (millions)
1	"Pilot"	J. Miller Tobin	Teleplay by : Amy Engelberg & Wendy Engelberg	June 5, 2017	1.28
Kibby is introduced as the newest co-host on The Lunch Hour. Mo goes viral after joking about Maxine's vagina on air, angering Maxine. Nina is having trouble getting pregnant due to Andrew's infertility, while having an affair with Shawn. Heather and Brad clash over how to raise their transgender child. When a routine facelift sends Maxine into a coma, her co-hosts start vying for her coveted left chair. Leon blackmails Mo with a sex video of them after she breaks up with him. Following an encounter with her scheming mother, Kibby relapses and is nearly arrested. After three days in a coma, Maxine awakens to discover that her co-hosts—with the exception of Kibby—have been attempting to steal her chair.
2	"Coma Bump"	Michael Grossman	Chris Alberghini	June 12, 2017	1.02
Maxine makes a surprise comeback on The Lunch Hour. Kibby confronts her mother to be a better parent to Tandy. Shawn insists that Nina leaves Andrew so they can be together, and she reveals that she is pregnant. Mo threatens to expose the real reason behind Maxine's coma, but her plan backfires when Maxine confesses on the show that she was about to undergo cosmetic surgery before her body rejected the anesthesia.
3	"Blind Items"	Tamra Davis	Mike Chessler	June 19, 2017	1.11
Maxine worries when she learns that her former assistant Anna Crouse is writing a tell-all book about her. To make matters worse, Nina and Shawn's affair makes it onto "Page Six" as a blind item. Andrew tells Nina he knows she is already pregnant by another man, threatening to ruin her career if she does not stay with him until after his run for Congress. Maxine hires celebrity sober coach Julian to help Kibby keep her life on track. After finding footage of Mo and Leon having sex on Maxine's chair, Maxine fires Mo from the show.
4	"Shut It Down"	Michael Lange	Jon Kinnally & Tracy Poust	June 26, 2017	0.92
Heather is intimidated by the show's new guest co-host, lifestyle expert Portia Camden, before realizing she might be attracted to her. Kibby is tasked with making amends with her former Lacey from Outer Spacey co-star Maddie Finn on air, after previously assaulting her during filming. Since Anna refuses to stop writing her tell-all book, Maxine sabotages Anna's interview with Sia twice, getting Anna fired from her current job. Anna ultimately agrees to drop the book, on the condition that Maxine hires her as a co-host on The Lunch Hour. After learning that Andrew already knows that Shawn is the father of Nina's baby, Shawn punches Andrew at Heather's listening party and reveals to everyone that Nina is actually pregnant with his baby.
5	"Baby Daddy Drama"	Michael Grossman	Davah Avena	July 3, 2017	0.80
The news of Nina and Shawn's affair causes a media feeding frenzy, prompting Maxine to hire a crisis manager to do damage control. Anna, on her first day as a guest co-host, ridicules Nina's marital problems, angering Andrew and causing Nina to storm off the show. Julian encourages Kibby to take a college class, but she is eventually expelled for making a scene in class. Maxine convinces Nina to return to the show, offering to help her deal with Andrew. In return, Nina helps Maxine take down Anna by exposing her police report for stalking her former co-worker and attacking his wife. Maxine fires Anna, who vows to resume work on her tell-all book. Nina reveals to Shawn that she took the article that won her a Pulitzer from a missing reporter and published it under her name.
6	"We Are Family"	Bille Woodruff	Ryan O'Connell	July 10, 2017	1.13
Julian convinces Kibby to throw a party to celebrate one year of sobriety. Tension increases between Nina and Shawn after she revealed the truth about her Pulitzer. Heather discovers online that Brad is cheating on her with a younger model. Detective Stagliano questions William about Maxine's deceased husband, Ted. Things go awry at Kibby's sobriety party when she walks in on an intoxicated Heather trying to fellate Julian. Kibby admits to Maxine that she relapsed while Maxine was in a coma. When Kibby and Julian confess their feelings for each other, he feels it is inappropriate and decides to resign. Shawn breaks up with Nina after she implies he might tell other people about her secret.
7	"Truth's a Mutha"	Dwight Little	Thembi Banks & Rochee Jeffrey; Story by Bryce Dallas Howard	July 17, 2017	1.08
Heather befriends the new transgender guest co-host, Janet Mock, pestering her with transgender-related questions. A visit by William's overbearing mother threatens to expose his relationship with Maxine. Nina and Shawn argue over custody of their unborn child. Kibby panics when she learns that a former Lacey from Outer Spacey co-star, Vance Gordon, is booked to appear on the show. Detective Stagliano furthers his investigation into Ted's death. Heather reveals to her co-hosts that she has a transgender daughter, while Maxine decides to make her relationship with William public on the show. After Nina is held hostage in an elevator by a crazed fan, she and Shawn reconcile.
8	"And the Loser Is..."	J. Miller Tobin	Jon Kinnally & Tracy Poust	July 24, 2017	1.01
Mo appears as a guest on The Lunch Hour's rival show, Morning Talk, prompting rumors that she is in talks to become a permanent co-host on that show. Jason tries to convince Maxine to rehire Mo, following unsuccessful attempts to find a replacement for her. William struggles with the media scrutiny over his relationship with Maxine. Kibby has an uncomfortable run-in with Vance at the Daytime Television Awards, which causes her to relapse. Meanwhile, Heather rekindles her relationship with Brad. After The Lunch Hour surprisingly beats Morning Talk at the Daytime Television Awards, Maxine invites Mo back to the show, only to discover that Mo lied about the offer from Morning Talk. Shawn suspects that Maxine is hiding something about the night Ted died.
9	"Whose Show Is It Anyway?"	Lev L. Spiro	Mike Chessler & Chris Alberghini	July 31, 2017	1.00
Kibby descends further into drug abuse after learning that her mother landed Tandy an audition for Vance's new sitcom. When Mo auditions for a role on Vance's sitcom, Maxine sees this as an opportunity to keep her away from The Lunch Hour. Maxine and Shawn both receive subpoenas requesting their phone records. Heather reveals she carries a gun in her purse, shocking her co-hosts. Vance agrees not to hire Tandy after Kibby threatens to expose him. After Maxine gets rid of the subpoenas, Nina seeks Anna, who claims to have evidence that Maxine murdered Ted. Nina uses that information to confront Maxine, demanding that she tell Shawn the truth. Kibby behaves erratically during Vance's guest appearance on The Lunch Hour. To make matters worse, Tandy appears as a surprise guest to announce she will be playing Vance's daughter on his sitcom. Backstage, Kibby takes Heather's gun and aims it at Vance. Ramona manages to tackle Kibby to the ground, but the gun accidentally discharges.
10	"Lunch Is on Us"	Peter Lauer	Amy Engelberg & Wendy Engelberg	July 31, 2017	0.65
Kibby reveals to Maxine that Vance abused her and led her into drugs when she was younger. Although no one was critically injured after Heather's gun discharged, Jason forces Maxine to fire Kibby temporarily. Anna plays Nina a tape of Maxine and Ted arguing the night he died, but the low quality makes it difficult to identify Ted's killer. During a live stream, Kibby denounces Vance as a predator—with the help of another one of his victims, Maddie—and later rejoins The Lunch Hour. After Nina steals Anna's tape and has it restored, Nina discovers that Shawn killed Ted. Maxine explains to Nina that after Ted became violent, Shawn attacked him in a drunken rage, and she asked William to help her make it look like an accident. Shawn, however, has little recollection of the incident. Anna blackmails Maxine upon discovering the truth about Ted's death. In order to protect Shawn, Maxine claims on air that she killed Ted in self-defense and gets arrested. Nina reveals to Anna that she stole her Pulitzer; in exchange, Shawn must never know he was the one who killed Ted. Nevertheless, Shawn listens to the tape and learns the truth.

== Production ==
On February 18, 2016, VH1 announced a television adaptation of Star Jones' best-selling book Satan's Sisters for 2017. The series is based on real behind-the-scenes events of The View, which Jones appeared on between 1997 and 2006. Vanessa Williams was announced as lead role on March 1. The show's head writers are Amy and Wendy Engelberg; it is directed by J. Miller Tobin. Production began in August 2016, and the series was retitled Daytime Divas. Tichina Arnold, Chloe Bridges, Camille Guaty and Fiona Gubelmann were announced as the other co-lead roles on August 22.

== Reception ==
On the review aggregator Rotten Tomatoes, the series holds an approval rating of 60% based on 10 reviews, with an average rating of 6.45/10. The website's critics consensus reads, "These Divas try a little too hard achieve genuine camp, but fans of prima donnas will find a catty enough array here." On Metacritic, the show has a score of 53 out of 100 based on four reviews, indicating "mixed or average reviews".
