= Scream Dream =

- Cover photo by Lynn Goldsmith

Studio album by Ted Nugent
- Released: June 1980
- Recorded: January–April 1980
- Studios: CBS Recording Studios, New York City, Quadradial Studios, Miami, Florida and Square Studios, Ann Arbor, Michigan
- Genre: Hard rock
- Length: 35:21
- Label: Epic
- Producers: Cliff Davies, Ric Browde, David McCullough, Lew Futterman

Ted Nugent chronology
State of Shock (1979)	Scream Dream (1980)	Intensities in 10 Cities (1981)

Singles from Scream Dream
- 1. "Flesh and Blood" Released: May 1980 (UK); 2. "Wango Tango" Released: July 1980

Professional ratings
Review scores
Source	Rating
AllMusic	3/5 stars
CD Review	7/10 & 5/10
Classic Rock	4/5 stars
Collector's Guide to Heavy Metal	9/10
Record Mirror	5/5 stars
Rolling Stone	(favorable)

Scream Dream is the sixth studio album by American hard rock musician Ted Nugent. The album was released in June 1980 by Epic Records, and reached number 13 on the Billboard 200. It was his last studio album to feature drummer Cliff Davies.

The album-opening "Wango Tango" became an instant Nugent standard, including a humorous middle breakdown section in which he shows off with a carnival barker-esque rap. Other highlights include "Terminus El Dorado", the title track, and "Hard as Nails".

Tracks "Wango Tango" and "Scream Dream" were later included in the compilation album Playlist: The Very Best of Ted Nugent.

== Critical reception ==
Billboard's reviewer left positive response on an album. He wrote: "The aural mayhem created here could be made by no other person than Nugent. While he does nothing on this outing that he hasn't done before, he always does it with enough zest and relish to make his point come across. He continues in the well trod path of hook-laced heavy metal with blazing guitar licks and intentionally humorous lyrics."

== Track listing ==
All songs written and arranged by Ted Nugent.

Side one
No.	Title	Length
1.	"Wango Tango"	4:50
2.	"Scream Dream"	3:18
3.	"Hard as Nails"	3:39
4.	"I Gotta Move"	2:18
5.	"Violent Love"	2:54

Side two
No.	Title	Length
6.	"Flesh and Blood"	4:44
7.	"Spit It Out"	3:53
8.	"Come and Get It"	3:18
9.	"Terminus El Dorado"	4:13
10.	"Don't Cry (I'll Be Back Before You Know It Baby)"	2:21

== Personnel ==
Band members

- Ted Nugent – lead vocals, lead and rhythm guitar
- Charlie Huhn – lead vocals on tracks 4 and 10, backing vocals, rhythm guitar
- Dave Kiswiney – bass, backing vocals
- Cliff Davies – drums, lead vocals on track 8, producer

Additional musicians

- The Immaculate Wangettes – backing vocals on track 1

Production

- Ric Browde, David McCullough – associate producers
- Lew Futterman – executive producer
- Tim Geelan – engineer, mixing, mastering supervisor
- Al Hurschman, David Gotlieb, Lou Schlossberg – assistant engineers
- George Marino, Ray Janos – mastering

== Charts ==
Chart (1980)	Peak position
Canada Top Albums/CDs (RPM)	26
UK Albums (Official Charts)	37
US Billboard 200	13

== Certifications ==
Region	Certification	Certified units/sales
Canada (Music Canada)	Gold	50,000^{^}
United States (RIAA)	Gold	500,000^{^}
^{^} Shipments figures based on certification alone.

== See also ==
- 1980 in music
- Ted Nugent discography
