= Scott Evans (actor) =

American actor (born 1983)

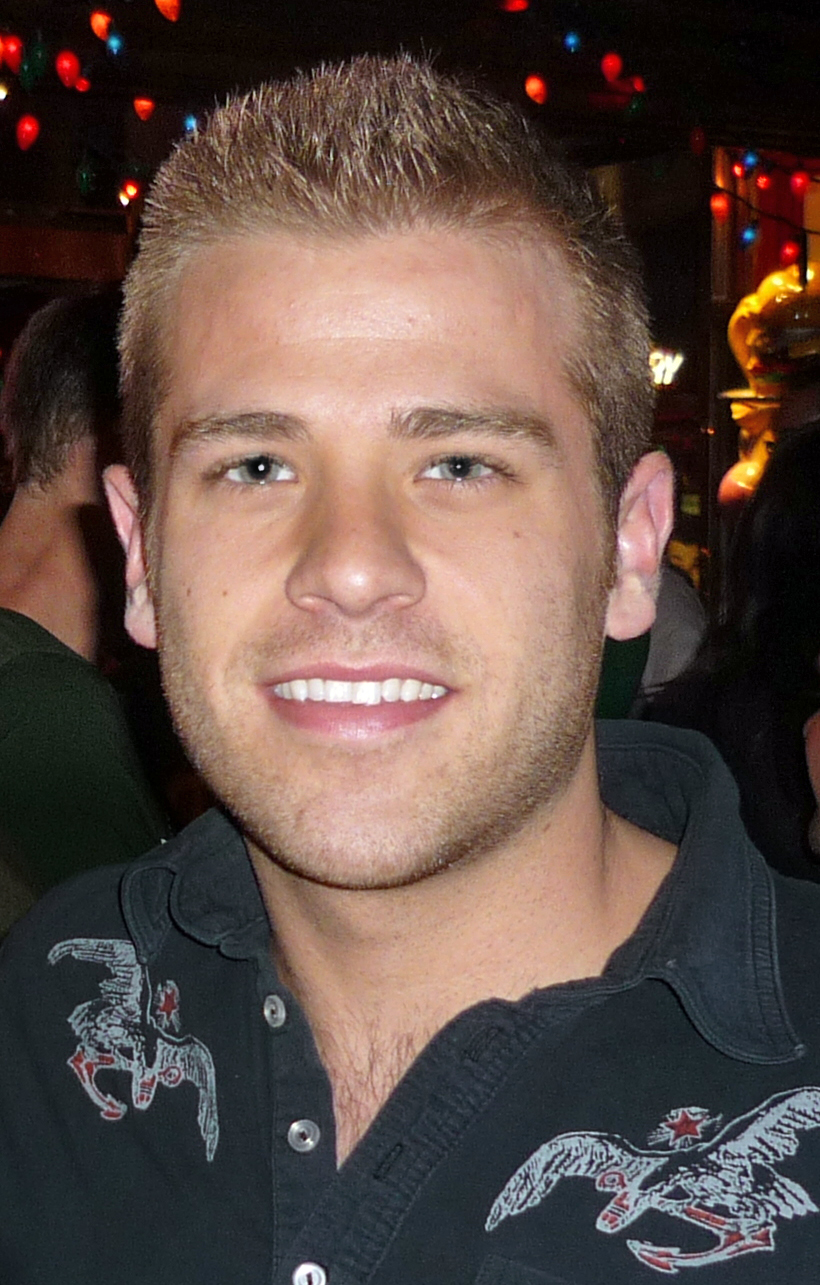
- Evans in 2010
- Born: Scott Andrew Evans; September 21, 1983 (age 43); Sudbury, Massachusetts, U.S.
- Education: New York University
- Occupation: Actor
- Years active: 2008–present
- Relatives: Chris Evans (brother); Mike Capuano (uncle)

Scott Andrew Evans (born September 21, 1983) is an American actor. He is known for playing the role of police officer Oliver Fish on the ABC daytime soap opera One Life to Live, the recurring role of Oliver on the series Grace and Frankie, and one of the Kens in Barbie. He is the younger brother of actor Chris Evans.

== Early life and personal life ==
Scott Andrew Evans was born September 21, 1983, and raised in Sudbury, Massachusetts. His parents are Bob Evans, a dentist, and Lisa (née Capuano) Evans, a dancer and later artistic director at the Concord Youth Theatre. He has two sisters, Carly and Shanna, and an older brother, actor Chris Evans. His father is of Welsh, English, Scottish, and German descent, while his mother is of half Irish and half Italian descent.

Evans began acting as a child in local theater productions in Massachusetts. He attended Lincoln-Sudbury High School.

Scott Evans studied theatre at New York University where he performed in "Mrs. Sharp" by Ryan Scott Oliver & Kirsten Guenther, directed by Ryan Mekenian, and featuring Alex Brightman and Ali Stroker. He is gay, having come out at age 19.

== Career ==
Evans began playing the recurring role of police officer Oliver Fish on One Life to Live on January 15, 2008. He subsequently appeared briefly on Guiding Light as Trey in 2008, and guest-starred as Woody Sage in the June 22, 2008 Law and Order: Criminal Intent episode "Betrayed" as well as the role of Ben in the October 21, 2008, Fringe episode "The Cure." Evans was also seen as Chad the Mail Clerk in the 2009 film Confessions of a Shopaholic.

Initially brought in to One Life to Live for five episodes, Evans returned for a total of 137 episodes. In July 2009, his character Oliver Fish became involved in a romantic relationship with Kyle Lewis, played by Brett Claywell. The storyline came to wider attention when Patricia Mauceri, an actress who had played the recurring role of Carlotta Vega on the One Life to Live since 1995, was replaced after reportedly voicing personal religious objections to her character's involvement in his storyline. The storyline on One Life to Live was dropped and both Evans and Claywell were let go in 2010. Evans also had a guest role on the AMC series Rubicon as an American involved in a serious terrorist attack with al-Qaeda.

In 2022, Evans played Darren Hayes' love interest in the music video for "Let's Try Being in Love". In 2023, he played a Western-themed Ken in Barbie.

In June 2024, Deadline announced that Evans had been cast in Mindy Kaling's forthcoming series Running Point.

== Filmography ==
=== Film ===
Key
†	Denotes works that have not yet been released

Year	Title	Role	Notes
2009	The Lovely Bones	Townsperson	
2009	Confessions of a Shopaholic	Chad	
2014	Behaving Badly	Ronnie Watt	
2014	Before We Go	Concierge	
2014	Playing It Cool	Blissful boy	
2015	Lily & Kat	Nick	
2015	Close Range	Deputy Logan	
2016	Badlands of Kain	Josh	
2016	Southbound	Danny	Short film
2018	Madhouse Mecca	Greg	
2020	Almost Love	Adam	
2023	Barbie	Stereotypical Ken	

=== Television ===
Year	Title	Role	Notes
2008–2010	One Life to Live	Oliver Fish	137 episodes
2008	Law & Order: Criminal Intent	Woody Sage (Scott Woodley)	Episode: "Betrayed"
2008	Guiding Light	Trey	2 episodes
2008	Fringe	Ben	Episode: "The Cure"
2010	Law & Order	Thomas Moran	Episode: "Steel-Eyed Death"
2010	Rubicon	Joe Purcell	Episode: "Wayward Sons"
2011	Law & Order: Criminal Intent	Shane Berlin	Episode: "Trophy Wine"
2012–13	White Collar	Dennis Flynn	2 episodes
2013	In the Dark	EMT Reid	Television film
2014	Looking	Cody Heller	Episode: "Looking for a Plus-One"
2014	Hit the Floor	Danny	Episode: "Unguarded"
2016	I Know Where Lizzie Is	Henry Spencer	Television film
2017	Daytime Divas	Julian	4 episodes
2018–2019	Grace and Frankie	Oliver	8 episodes
2019	Into the Dark	Joel	Episode: "Midnight Kiss"
2023	With Love	James	3 episodes
2025	Running Point	Charlie	Recurring role
2025	All's Fair	Eric Dunkin	Episode: "This Is Me Trying"
