= Bluebox Films =

Film production and distribution company

Bluebox Limited Films
- Industry: Film and television
- Founded: 2001
- Headquarters: Bettendorf, Iowa, USA; Los Angeles, California, USA
- Key people: Scott Beck, President; Bryan Woods, President
- Website: blueboxfilms.com

Bluebox Limited Films is a production company and film distributor founded by Scott Beck and Bryan Woods. The company's founders were among the top 50 in the Director's competition of Project Greenlight. The pair secured a deal with MTV Films after winning MTVU's Best Film on Campus competition with their feature University Heights.

== Films ==
- University Heights (2004)
- Her Summer (2004)
- The Bride Wore Blood (2006)
- Impulse (2010)

== Television ==
- Spread (2012) (Pilot)

== Music videos ==
- "Self Indulgent Feeling", Vanaprasta (2012)
