= Jennifer R. Blake =

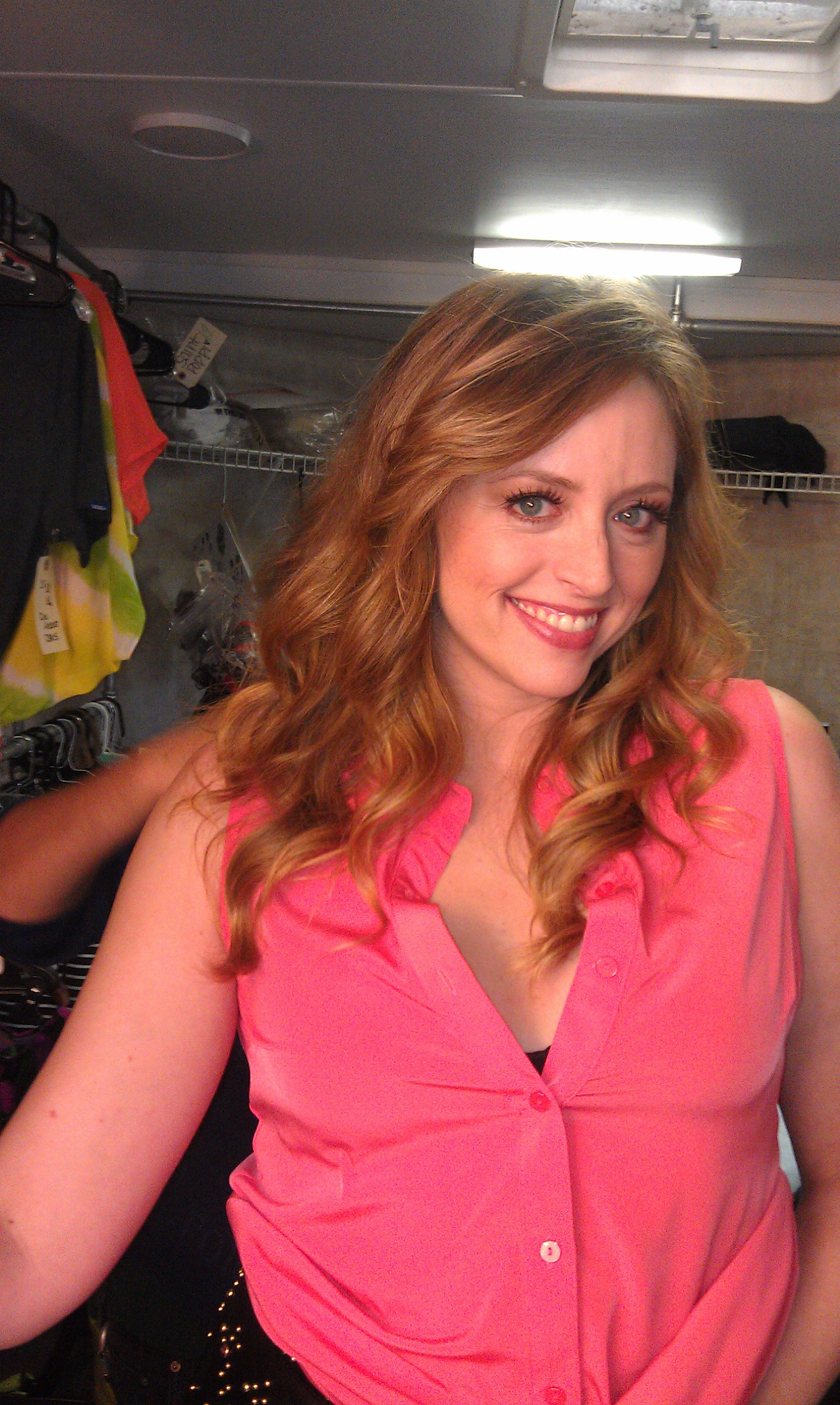

Background information
- Occupations: Actress, singer
- Instrument: Vocals
- Years active: 1999–present
- Website: www.mccreadythemusical.org

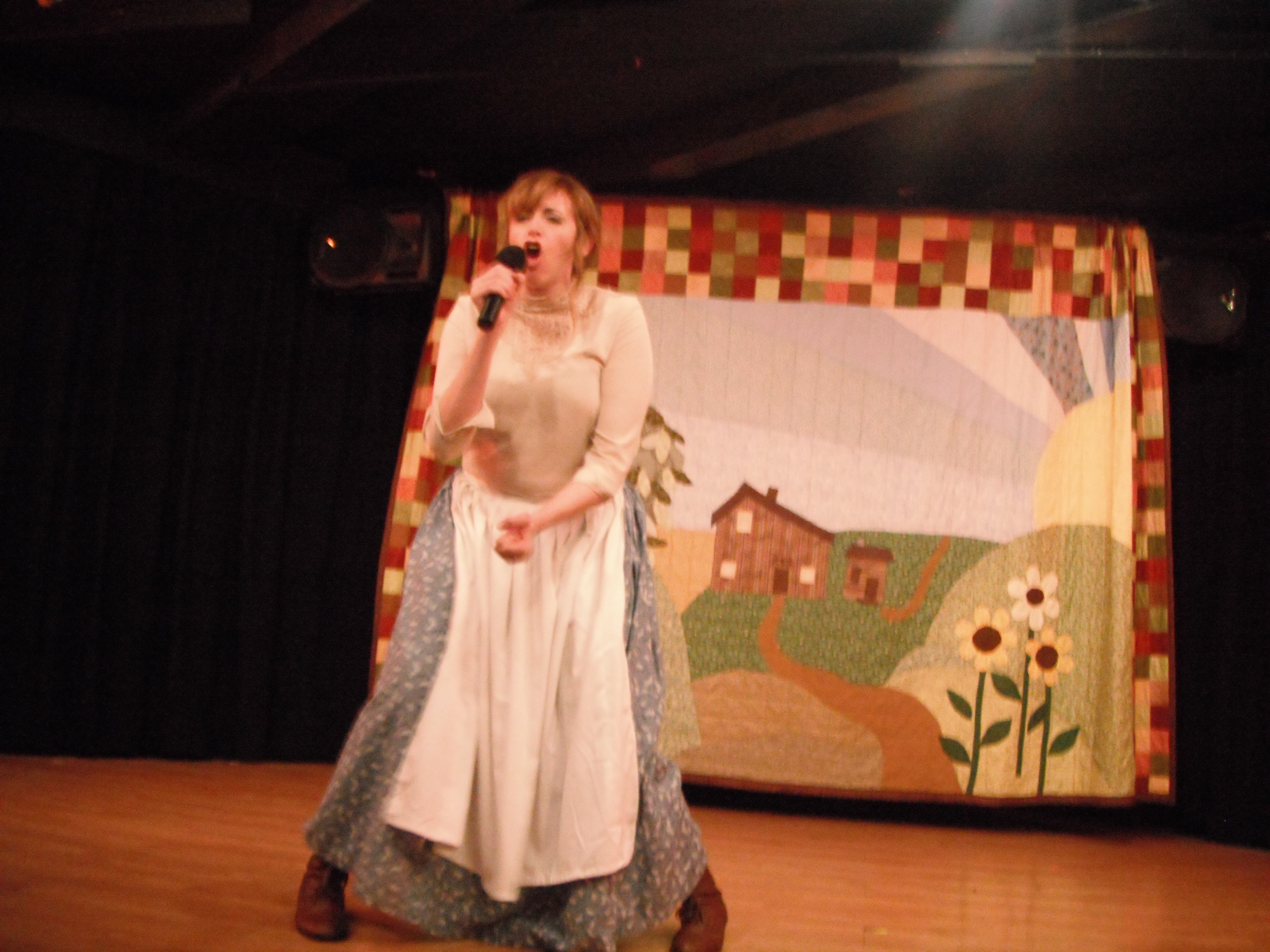
Jennifer Blake in the role of Caroline (Ma) in Prairie-Oke at the Cavern Club Theatre, Los Angeles

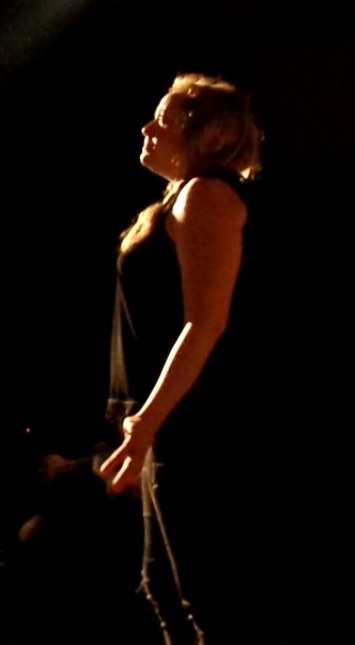
Jennifer Blake in the role of Mindy McCready, McCready the Musical

Jennifer R. Blake is an American actress and producer who has performed in television, film and musical theatre.

== Career ==
Jennifer Blake is a notable alumna of The Boston Conservatory, where she earned a BFA in Musical Theatre and has appeared in television, film and musical stage plays in Boston, New York and Los Angeles.

She produced and starred in the role of Mindy McCready in McCready The Musical at Spirit Studio in Silver Lake, Los Angeles, May–June, 2015, reimagined and iterated during the Hollywood Fringe Festival, Los Angeles, June, 2016, and reprised Off-Broadway at The Triad Theater, New York City, September, 2016. She was also co-creator and co-producer of the show in New York City.

She co-starred in Behaving Badly (2014). She guest-starred in the prime-time comedy series How to Live with Your Parents (for the Rest of Your Life) in the role of Nirvana on ABC. She also guest-starred in the NBC comedy Marlon (TV series) starring Marlon Wayans (2017).

One of her most notable roles in musical theatre has been as the character Susan in the 2010 Los Angeles premiere of [title of show], at the Celebration Theatre. She was called in for an audition and remarkably learned the role in three weeks. Her performance was awarded Outstanding Performance by a Lead Actress in a Musical by StagesceneLA.

Jennifer Blake was also critically esteemed for her lead role in Side By Side By Sondheim at The Attic Theatre, Los Angeles, and was awarded Outstanding Performance by an Ensemble Cast/Musical by StageSceneLA.

She was in the original cast of the Off-Broadway New York City production of The Donkey Show, in the roles of Disco Girl/Swing for Hellen/Vinnie/Mia/Oberon.

She earned critical acclaim for her 2013 role of Caroline (Ma) in Prairie-Oke! at the Cavern Club Theatre, Los Angeles. and for her 2012 lead role in Are You There God? It's Me, Karen Carpenter at the Hudson Mainstage (Los Angeles), reprised in 2013 at the Palm Canyon Theater (Palm Springs, CA).

She appeared in a musical based upon the life of Charles Bukowski, Bukowsical!, (Swing) at the Sacred Fools Theater Company, Los Angeles, a production which was taken to New York City and presented at the New York International Fringe Festival, and the show was awarded as Outstanding Musical. She participated in the original cast recording.

Other notable roles include Hair in the role of Jeannie at the Bay Street Theatre, New York; Jesus Christ Superstar in the role of Mary Magdalene at The Attic Theatre, Los Angeles; Chess in the Ensemble and in the role of Vanity Fair Reporter at The Lyric Theatre, Boston; and Ex(it) Wounds at IO Mainstage, Los Angeles.; The Crucible in the role of Betty Parris at the Alabama Shakespeare Festival; Grease in the role of Marty at the West Virginia Public Theatre; and The Will Rogers Follies in the role of Ziegfeld Girl at the Galveston Island Outdoor Musicals, Texas.

Her television appearances have included Late Show with David Letterman, broadcast on CBS, Sketch Artist; Sex and the City, Co-Star; Contest Searchlight, Co-Star; and in the series How to Live with Your Parents (for the Rest of Your Life) in the role of Nirvana on ABC. She also sang on Ryan Adams' album Love is Hell, B sides.

She was producer/actor in "The Bar", a comedy web series about the South.

In 2024, Jennifer booked the guest star role of Deena Milsap in the acclaimed HBO series The Righteous Gemstones. She shot this in Charleston, SC, with Danny McBride at the helm, and actor Michael Rooker starring as her husband, Cobb Milsap. Though her scenes made the director's cut, the studio decided to shorten the episodes for time.

== Filmography ==
Film
Year	Title	Role	Notes
2024	The Righteous Gemstones	Deena Milsap	HBO
2024	George and Mindy's First Marriage	Doreen	CBS
2015	"The Bar" web comedy series	T.K.	
2014	Behaving Badly	Janice	
2013	How to Live with Your Parents (for the Rest of Your Life)	Nirvana	TV series ABC
2012	Jayne Mansfield's Car	(ADR Loop Group)	
2010/I	Hello (short)(I)	Jennifer Randall	
2008	Simon (short)	Anna	
2006	My Mother's Hairdo (short)	Dancer at the Hairdo	
2004	The Stepford Wives	Stepford wife	
2001	Zoolander	Fashionista	

== Awards ==
Outstanding Performance by a Lead Actress in a Musical for the role of Susan in [title of show] from StagesceneLA's Best of LA Theatre Awards 2009–2010

Outstanding Performance by an Ensemble Cast/Musical for Side By Side By Sondheim from StagesceneLA's Best of LA Theatre Awards 2009–2010

Memorable Performance by an Ensemble Cast/Musical Spoof for Prairie-Oke from StagesceneLA's Best of LA Theatre Awards 2012–2013

== Community volunteer activities ==
Blake has given generously of her time to children in need through CoachArt, Los Angeles, a non-profit organization offering free lessons in the arts and athletics to patients with chronic illnesses and their siblings, ages 6 – 18. She also traveled to Delhi, India, as a volunteer on a build in the Bawana district for Habitat for Humanity International's Global Village Program.

She produced the California for Alabama Benefit at MBAR, which was for the victims of the 2011 tornadoes that killed hundreds and left thousands homeless or with significant damage. The event was to benefit the local charity California for Alabama: California residents by way of Alabama collecting and delivering donations to the areas of Alabama ravaged by the April 27, 2011 tornado outbreak.

Among her other volunteer interests are East L.A. Classic Theatre, the nation's only Latino based Theater Company that offers professionally performed Shakespeare adapted for youth in underserved communities of color and ENRICHLA Interdisciplinary Garden Program, an Environmental Non-profit focused on helping students build a good work ethic, promoting thoughtful and healthy eating habits, and adding edible school gardens to public schools.

She has also had a part in The Creative Coalition, the premier nonprofit, nonpartisan social and political advocacy organization of the entertainment industry. and The National Lab Network, a national initiative that connects K-12 teachers with science, technology, engineering and mathematics professionals to bring hands-on learning experiences to students in all 50 states
