= Britannia High =

- Genre: Musical drama
- Created by: Arlene Phillips; David Ian
- Starring: Mitch Hewer; Georgina Hagen; Sapphire Elia; Rana Roy; Matthew James Thomas; Marcquelle Ward; Adam Garcia; Mark Benton
- Country of origin: United Kingdom
- Original language: English
- No. of series: 1
- No. of episodes: 9

Production
- Producers: Brian Grant; Gareth Philips
- Running time: 60 minutes (inc. adverts)

Original release
- Network: ITV/CITV (UK), TV3 (ROI)
- Release: 26 October – 20 December 2008

Britannia High is a British musical drama television series co-produced by Granada Television and Globe Productions for the ITV network. The series focused on the lives of a group of teenagers and their mentors at a fictional London theatre school. It aired on ITV and TV3 Ireland, premiering on 26 October 2008.

The show starred Sapphire Elia, Georgina Hagen, Mitch Hewer, Rana Roy, Matthew James Thomas and Marcquelle Ward, as well as Adam Garcia as the dance mentor, Lorraine Pilkington as the music mentor and Mark Benton as the school principal and acting mentor. In addition to the main cast, the series featured cameo performances from Girls Aloud, Boyzone, Matt Willis and Gemma Bissix. Also, Aston Merrygold, lead singer of boy band JLS, auditioned for a role before his success in the group - but only made it to the final 16. Pixie Lott also auditioned, as did Ed Sheeran, Zizi Strallen and Danielle Peazer. The show featured an original soundtrack which was created by a team of pop producers and writers in the UK, led by Take That member Gary Barlow.

== Production ==
Britannia High was based on an idea by Strictly Come Dancing choreography judge Arlene Phillips and theatre impresario David Ian, who were both executive producers for the show. It was developed by producer Gareth Philips for ITV Productions in Manchester. Alongside Philips, the production team consisted of series producer and lead director Brian Grant, executive producers Kieran Roberts and Mark Wells, and Anita Land for Globe Productions. It was written by Jonathan Harvey, Damon Rochefort, Julie Jones, Kirstie Falkous, and John Regier.

In addition to Arlene Phillips managing the choreography, Gary Barlow was heavily involved in providing the score of Britannia High. Guy Chambers, Steve Mac, Andy Hill, Mark Owen, James Bourne and Eliot Kennedy also contributed to the musical component of the show.

Britannia High was commissioned by ITV from its in-house production division. After low ratings, ITV did not commission a second series.

== Episode list ==
Britannia High began broadcasting in a primetime Sunday night slot starting on 26 October 2008. The first episode was made available on ITV Player as a "sneak peek" on 17 October.

Episode No.	Episode Name	Central Character	Songs
1.01	Let's Dance!	Lauren	"Start of Something", "Watch This Space" and "Best of Me"
All the students at Britannia High worked hard to get in Britannia High, however, Lauren got in with an easy pass as she was found singing at a wedding and got offered a place at the school. Lauren finds it hard to fit in amongst the crowd as Claudine is always mean and catty with her, but the heartthrob of the school, Danny, has his eye on her. She also finds the dance routine particularly hard and is scared she will lose her place.
1.02	Behind the Mask	Danny	"Changing Man", "I'm the Man" and "Missing Person"
BB and Jez secretly sign Danny for student rep. He has to interview Girls Aloud members Nicola and Kimberley in front of the whole school. It is then revealed that Danny is dyslexic after running out of the hall as Nicola and Kimberly think he is not being serious.: Guest starring Nicola Roberts and Kimberley Walsh as themselves.
1.03	Who Are You?	Jez	"Wake Up", "I Am Who I Am" and "Proud"
When Jez bumps into some old friends at his birthday party, he's forced to confess a big secret! He is really rich and living in a building behind Harrods. When his father discovers he enrolled in Britannia High, he orders him to quit, otherwise he will no longer be in the family fold. It is revealed in this episode that Jez is gay. Lola gives him a magazine at his birthday party and says, "Three steps to getting your man, happy birthday!". Also Jez's father says, "Seems like having a gay son gives me more opportunities to put my foot in it".: Guest starring Danny Webb as Jack Tyler.
1.04	Fame	Lola	"Overnight Sensation", "Get Over Yourself", "Picking Up The Pieces"
When Lola bumps into Matt Willis on a night out and gets photographed with him, she sells her story to a reporter, Lizzie Porter, a journalist for The Sun, and starts to make up lies about Matt to keep herself in the press, however, her new-found celebrity status comes at a price as Principal Nugent gives her a choice: either she decides to leave Britannia High, and continue living the high life, or, she stays at Britannia High and gives up her new status. Lola decides to quit Britannia High, which shocks Lauren, Danny, Claudine and the rest of the gang, but when everything starts to fall apart, has Lola made the biggest mistake of her life?: Guest starring Gemma Bissix as Lizzie Porter, Richard Blackwood as Anton Davids. Keith Duffy, Stephen Gately, Ryan Thomas and Matt Willis, all as themselves.
1.05	Go Your Own Way	BB	"Confessions", "Fight Song", "The Things That We Don't Say"
BB's life is changed forever when his older brother, Julius, spots him in the dance studio. Desperate to prove his manhood, he joins Julius' gang and is forced to handle a gun when he states that the school has not made him soft. When he refuses to raid a shop, the lads drive off in BB's car. When BB goes back to Julius' flat, he has an argument with his brother and leaves the flat to sleep at school. The next morning, BB find out through the headteacher that his brother and a "mate" had a gun fight and Julius was shot. BB runs all the way to hospital and holds Julius' hand as he dies. BB gets angry around everyone and threatens to kill the murderer. However, Jez convinces him otherwise and the episode ends with the gang doing street dancing.
1.06	Miss Independent	Claudine	"You've Got Nothing On Me", "Wake The Dead" and "Growing Pains"
Claudine's head over heels in love with Danny, but he only has eyes for Lauren. Determined to ruin their relationship, Claudine steals the rose and card that Danny left on Lauren's bed to celebrate three months together, making Lauren think that he's forgotten. Claudine then leaves a present for Danny in his locker, and remarks to Lauren that Danny may have a "secret admirer", further angering Lauren. Meanwhile, Lola is convinced that she's seen a ghost and the gang plays a prank on her, organising a midnight ghost hunt in the school, with Ronnie dressed up as a ghost. During the ghost hunt, Danny and Lauren, now aware of Claudine's plan to split them up, confront her about it. Claudine runs off in tears, before calling Lola an idiot, and taunting BB about his dead brother, Julius. Danny and Lauren then feel guilty for provoking her, and run off to find her. Claudine tells Danny tearfully all about her past, and that her mother used to secretly abuse her when she was a kid. Realising that, underneath all of the make up, Claudine is really a sweet, troubled girl, Danny tries to cheer her up by singing 'Growing Pains' to her and dressing up in the old stage costumes, and eventually, she laughs, and joins in. When the song is over, Claudine confesses her love to Danny, but says that she understands that he doesn't love her back. After a little hesitation, Danny and Claudine kiss, unaware that a shocked Lauren is backstage, watching...
1.07	Don't Stand So Close To Me	Stefan	"Body To Body", "Obsession" and "What Good Is Love?"
The gang steals Lola's diary and learns of her relationship with Stefan. Stefan chooses Lola to represent the school in a dance contest and she has extra rehearsals alone with Stefan to prepare for it. When Stefan eventually admits he has feelings for her, Lola plans to drop out of Britannia High and join another performing arts school so they can be together. Stefan decides to return to Australia to prevent Lola from basing her life around their relationship. This episode features the classic line: Lola: "Does he like Pea & Ham...or Ham & Pea?". Meanwhile, Lauren struggles to come to terms with her heartbreak over Danny and tries to be friends with Claudine.
1.08	With A Little Help From My Friends	Ronnie	"So High", "Weight Of The World" "Do It All Over Again",
Canteen girl Ronnie is determined to try to earn a place in the end-of-year showcase, so much so she asks Jez for help. However, his kindness of not telling her she is a bad singer leads to humiliation. Ronnie decides to leave Britannia High, and Jez unsuccessfully runs after her in attempt to convince her otherwise. However, Ronnie changes her mind and returns to her canteen job, while taking an evening course in hair and make-up so she can continue pursuing her dream of working in theatre. Also, Lauren deals with the possibility that she may have multiple sclerosis, and Danny finds himself in a dilemma when he reveals he has feelings for both Lauren and Claudine.
1.09	Finale	Cast	"Start of Something", "Without You", "Changing Man", "Best of Me", "Watch This Space", "Things That We Don't Say", "Wake Up", "Proud", "Body to Body", "Growing Pains"
Tensions are high between the students at the end of year showcase. Lauren gets her test results back, and is revealed that she does not have multiple sclerosis. Jez's dad attends the showcase; he apologises to Jez and welcomes him back home. Stefan returns, admitting that he cannot stop thinking about Lola, and suggests that she goes to Australia with him, and she agrees. BB and Jez make plans to travel around the world, but Jez drops out after he and his father reconcile. Ronnie jumps on the chance to join BB on his world trip. Danny chooses Lauren over Claudine; after that, Danny confronts Claudine, but she already knew that Danny chose Lauren first, giving him a slap. In the end, the showcase was successful, making everyone forget about their feuds, admitting they wouldn't have had it differently. As the episode ends, the cast comes together to sing their last song, "Without You".: The live performances in this episode were recorded live, but were mimed by the cast, with the exception of the vocals from Matthew Thomas in "Proud" and Sapphire Elia in "Growing Pains". Also, Boyzone make a guest appearance with their new single "Better".

=== Release ===
Country	Network(s)	Series premiere
United Kingdom	ITV/CITV	26 October 2008
Australia	Seven Network; Nickelodeon	6 December 2008; 2009
Hong Kong	TVB J2	29 November 2009
Israel	yes stars Base; HOT family	22 January 2010
Cyprus	RIK 2	2010
France	W9	26 October 2009
Brazil	HBO Family Brazil	2009
Ecuador	Boomerang	2010
Mexico	Boomerang	2010
Peru	Boomerang	2010
Venezuela	Boomerang	2010
Dominican Republic	Boomerang	2010
Poland	TVP1	11 September 2010
Finland	SuomiTV	10 January 2011
India	Zee Café	April 2011
Spain	ETB 3	27 June 2011
Canada	OutTV (Canada)	April 2017

=== Weekly ratings ===
#	Episode	UK air date	Timeslot	Viewers (millions)	Audience share in timeslot
1	"Let's Dance"	26 October 2008	6:15 pm	3.55	14.5%
2	"Behind the Mask"	2 November 2008	7.15 pm	4.27	16.2%
3	"Who Are You?"	9 November 2008	7:00 pm	2.53	10.4%
4	"Fame"	16 November 2008	7:00 pm	2.51	10.2%
5	"Go Your Own Way"	23 November 2008	7:00 pm	2.54	10.6%
6	"Miss Independent"	30 November 2008	7:00 pm	2.01	8.3%
7	"Don't Stand So Close To Me"	7 December 2008	6:30pm	1.95	8.2%
8	"With A Little Help From My Friends"	14 December 2008	7:00pm	1.79	7.3%
9	"Finale"	20 December 2008	5:30pm	1.30	6.6%

Episode 2 was delayed by 15 minutes due to overrunning ITV Sport coverage of the Brazilian Grand Prix.

== Interactive elements ==
Britannia High featured a wide range of online content, including on itv.com, ITV Mobile, ITV Interactive and the social networking site, Bebo.

The Britannia High website was the virtual home of the performing arts school, and featured interactive elements such as blogs, photographs, e-newsletters and music from Universal Artists. Additionally, two characters, BB and Jez, hosted a podcast featuring songs from the series and also world songs. ITV's red button service, ITV Interactive, featured preview and catch-up videos, character profiles, photo galleries and dance tutorials.

== Soundtrack ==
The Britannia High Soundtrack was released on 24 November 2008. It included 18 songs from the show.

=== Track listing ===
1. Cast - "Start Of Something"
2. Danny - "Missing Person"
3. Lauren - "Best Of Me"
4. Lauren and Claudine - "Watch This Space"
5. Claudine and Danny - "Growing Pains"
6. Lauren and Jez - "What Good Is Love"
7. Lauren - "So High"
8. Jez - "Wake Up"
9. Lola and Stefan - "Body To Body"
10. BB - "The Things That We Don't Say"
11. Jez - "Proud"
12. BB and Jez - "Fight Song"
13. Claudine - "Do It All Over Again"
14. Lola, Lauren and Claudine - "Picking Up The Pieces"
15. BB - "Confessions"
16. Cast - "Without You"
17. Jez - "Weight Of The World"
18. Danny and Lauren - "Changing Man"

The CD also features a weblink which allows the owner to download a "Britannia High Megamix" (ft. "Start Of Something", "Wake Up", "Missing Person", "Best of Me" and "Watch This Space"), "Start of Something" video, and "Start of Something" (behind the scenes).

== Additional broadcast ==
=== CITV ===
The hour-long episodes of Britannia High were reconfigured into two-part 30-minute episodes, and broadcast on ITV's children's channel CITV from 20 April 2009. In accordance with CITV's target audience, words such as "bitch", "pudding" and "sex" have been edited out of dialogue and songs.

=== On Demand ===
All nine 45-minute episodes were made available to Virgin Media's customers through ITV Player, which was carried on Virgin's All Gregg All the Time service.
