= Intensities in 10 Cities =

Live album by Ted Nugent
- Released: March 2, 1981
- Recorded: August–September 1980
- Genre: Hard rock
- Length: 42:27
- Label: Epic
- Producers: Ric Browde, Cliff Davies, Lew Futterman

Ted Nugent chronology
Scream Dream (1980)	Intensities in 10 Cities (1981)	Nugent (1982)

Singles from Intensities in 10 Cities
- 1. "Land of a Thousand Dances" Released: February 1981

Intensities in 10 Cities is the second live album by the American guitarist Ted Nugent, released in 1981 and consisting of ten songs recorded during the last ten dates of Nugent's 1980 tour. Nugent played two or three new songs every night on the tour and told audiences he was recording them for possible inclusion in a new live album featuring all previously unreleased songs. None of the songs had appeared on any previous Ted Nugent album. Nugent explained at the time that about twenty previously unreleased songs were played at the beginning of the tour, and at the end the best ten were recorded live rather than in the studio later, because they were well-honed from months of performances and had the extra spark of a live setting. It was Ted Nugent's final album for Epic Records and the last album to feature drummer Cliff Davies.

== Reception ==
Professional ratings
Review scores
Source	Rating
AllMusic	3/5 stars
Collector's Guide to Heavy Metal	5/10
Record Mirror	1/5 stars

The album was ranked at number 9 on Guitar World's list of the "Top 10 Live Albums". Australian band TISM parodied the title on their 1991 video release Incontinent in Ten Continents.

The ten cities/venues were:

- Detroit – Cobo Arena
- Buffalo – Buffalo Memorial Auditorium
- Richfield – Richfield Coliseum
- Toronto – Maple Leaf Gardens
- Montreal – Montreal Forum
- Boston – Boston Garden
- New Haven – New Haven Coliseum
- Pittsburgh – Civic Arena
- Rochester – Rochester Community War Memorial
- Providence – Providence Civic Center

Two tracks from the album (as well as others from various Nugent live releases) appeared on his 2010 release Setlist, part of Legacy Recordings' series of live artist-specific compilations from its catalog. "The Flying Lip Lock" is listed as from the New Haven Coliseum, and "I Take No Prisoners" from the Providence Civic Center. This is the first time specific tracks have been identified as from specific venues.

=== Controversy ===
The song "Jailbait" sparked backlash as the lyrics discuss wanting to have sex with a 13-year-old, which would constitute statutory rape ("Well, I don't care if you're just thirteen, you look too good to be true"), and later sharing her when the police show up to arrest the perpetrator ("Wait a minute, officer, don't put those handcuffs on me / Put them on her and I'll share her with you"). These lyrics have retrospectively been pointed out to be hypocritical, given Nugent's frequent political campaigning with and for "family values" candidates.

=== Other info ===
The cover of "Land of a Thousand Dances" includes parts of the lyrics from the song "Shotgun" by Junior Walker & the All Stars.

== Track listing ==
All songs written and arranged by Ted Nugent, except "Land of a Thousand Dances", written by Chris Kenner.

Side one

1. "Put Up or Shut Up" – 3:21
2. "Spontaneous Combustion" – 3:53
3. "My Love Is Like a Tire Iron" – 5:48
4. "Jailbait" – 5:15
5. "I Am a Predator" – 3:16

Side two

6. "Heads Will Roll" – 4:07
7. "The Flying Lip Lock" – 4:07
8. "Land of a Thousand Dances" – 4:39
9. "The TNT Overture" – 4:31
10. "I Take No Prisoners" – 3:30

== Personnel ==
Band members

- Ted Nugent – lead vocals, lead guitar
- Charlie Huhn – lead and backing vocals, rhythm guitar
- Dave Kiswiney – bass, backing vocals
- Cliff Davies – drums, percussion, backing vocals, producer

Production

- Ric Browde – producer
- Lew Futterman – executive producer
- David McCullough – assistant producer, live sound engineer
- Al Hurschman, Dee Hurschman, Greg Klinginsmith, Tim Geelan, Mason Harlow – engineers
- Ray Janos – mastering

== Charts ==
Chart (1981)	Peak position
Canada Top Albums/CDs (RPM)	17
UK Albums (Official Charts)	75
US Billboard 200	51
