= Ric Browde =

American record producer and writer

- Born: June 25, 1954 (age 72)
- Occupations: Author; record producer; songwriter
- Website: ricbrowde.com

Ric Browde is an American author, record producer, and songwriter. In the 1970s, Browde was working as a roadie, writing music for films, and was involved in the production of albums by guitarist Ted Nugent, first as his assistant and later on as producer. Browde worked on seven Nugent albums, including platinum awarded Double Live Gonzo! (1978), Scream Dream (1980), and Intensities in 10 Cities (1981), before starting his own production company in 1982 and producing W.A.S.P., and Victory.

Browde was involved in the emergence of the Los Angeles glam music scene in the 1980s. He produced and arranged Poison's multi-platinum debut studio album, Look What the Cat Dragged In (1986). Browde followed by producing, arranging and co-writing Faster Pussycat's band co-writing and co-producing Joan Jett's return to commercial success with Up Your Alley in 1988. Browde later produced a series of commercially unsuccessful albums, including the Dogs D'Amour's Straight??!! (1990), Finnish guitarist Andy McCoy, LA Glamsters, Jetboy, English girl group No Shame, Los Angeles bands Flies on Fire and Kill for Thrills, and the Italian band Armed Venus.

Browde recorded thirty-six albums that sold over twenty-seven million records earning eight platinum and eleven gold records .

After his record sales dwindled, Browde wrote a satirical and somewhat autobiographical novel, While I'm Dead Feed the Dog in 2000. Translated into several languages, the book was also adapted into the 2012 film Behaving Badly, starring Nat Wolff and Selena Gomez. The film did not see release until 2014 and has been publicly disavowed by Browde who has lampooned the movie in his blog, "While I'm Dead...Feed the Dog...the Blog - the story behind the story behind the movie that has nothing to do with the story." He also took a job as a telephone psychic to write a book about the scam phone psychic business that defrauded millions of unwitting people across the United States of hundreds of million dollars. The book Tale from the Psychic Hot Line is still available on Kindle
