= Britannia High (soundtrack) =

Britannia High Soundtrack

Soundtrack album by Britannia High Cast
- Released: 24 November 2008
- Genre: Dance; Pop
- Length: 59:20
- Label: Polydor

Singles from Britannia High Soundtrack
- 1. "Proud" Released: 2008

Britannia High Soundtrack is the soundtrack album released from the ITV television show Britannia High The soundtrack features 18 songs from the series. The album is according to Play.com available in 2 different cover colours; the original Blue and the Limited Edition Pink. The album was released on 24 November 2008 by Polydor. The album failed to chart.

== Track listing ==
1. "Start of Something" (Gary Barlow / Eliot Kennedy / Andy Hill)- 2:50
2. "Missing Person" (Gary Barlow/Eliot Kennedy/Gary Baker (Gary Go)) – 2:43
3. "Best of Me" – (Eliot Kennedy/Gary Barlow/Gary Baker (Gary Go)/James Bourne – 3:10
4. "Watch This Space" – (Stephen Lipson/Nina Woodford/Phil Thornalley) – 3:34
5. "Growing Pains" – (Eliot Kennedy/Chris Braide/Nina Woodford) 3:25
6. "What Good Is Love?" -(Gary Barlow/Chris Braide/Stephen Lipson) – 2:50
7. "So High" – (Stephen Lipson/Nina Woodford) – 2:25
8. "Wake Up" – (Eliot Kennedy/Steve Robson/Andy Hill) – 2:48
9. "Body To Body" – (Karen Poole/Jem Godfrey/Martin Terefe) – 2:58
10. "The Things That We Don't Say" – (M Sutton/Chris Neil/Eg White)- 3:35
11. "Proud" – (Steve Mac/Wayne Hector/Andy Hill) – 3:28
12. "Fight Song" – (Steve Mac/Chris Braide/Mark Owen) – 3:30
13. "Do It All Over Again" – (Eliot Kennedy/Gary Barlow/Ina Wroldsen) – 4:00
14. "Picking Up The Pieces" – (M Sutton/Ina Wroldsen/Mark Owen) 3:26
15. "Confessions" – (Gary Barlow/Eliot Kennedy/Jem Godfrey/Bill Padley/S Osuji/H Thomson) – 3:27
16. "Without You" – (Gary Barlow/Lucie Silvas) – 3:49
17. "Weight of the World" – (Guy Chambers/Mark Owen/Ina Wroldsen) – 2:43
18. "Changing Man" – (M Prime/Bryn Christopher/Tim Woodcock) 3:55
- There is also a weblink on the CD which allows the owner to download a Britannia High Megamix (ft. Start of Something, Wake Up, Missing Person, Best of Me and Watch This Space), Start of Something video, Start of Something (behind the scenes) and a remix of Watch This Space. These bonuses are also available on iTunes to buy.

== Reception ==
The single "Watch This Space" from the soundtrack received a negative review in Digital Spy, which described it as being, along with the rest of the soundtrack, "somewhere between tolerable and terrible."
