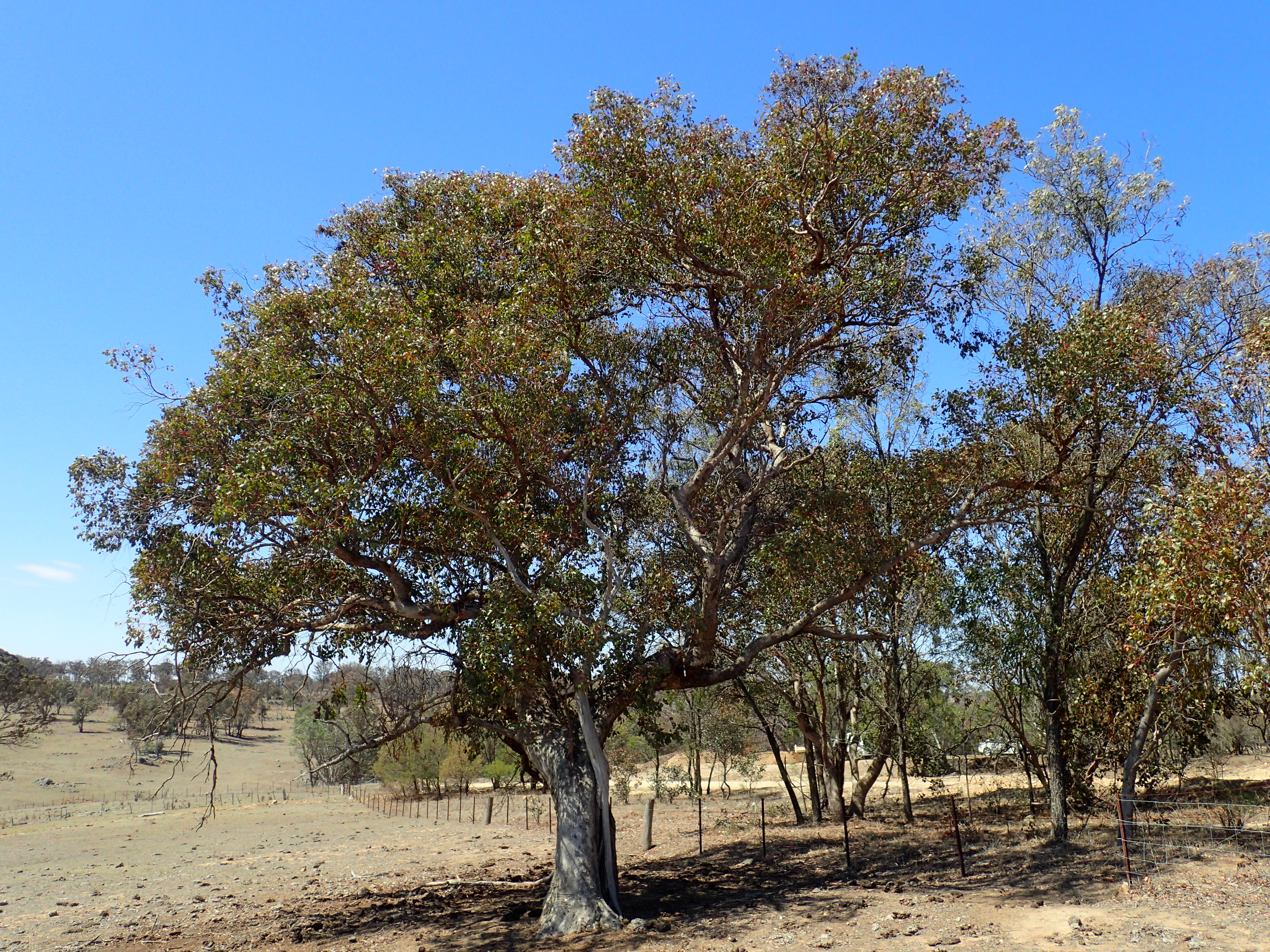
- Eucalyptus magnificata near Hillgrove

Conservation status
- Endangered (IUCN 3.1)

Scientific classification
- Kingdom: Plantae
- Clade: Tracheophytes
- Clade: Angiosperms
- Clade: Eudicots
- Clade: Rosids
- Order: Myrtales
- Family: Myrtaceae
- Genus: Eucalyptus
- Species: E. magnificata

Binomial name
- Eucalyptus magnificata L.A.S.Johnson & K.D.Hill

= Eucalyptus magnificata =

Blue box

Species of eucalyptus

Eucalyptus magnificata, commonly known as blue box or northern blue box, is a species of small tree or sometimes a mallee that is restricted to a small area of New South Wales. It has rough, fibrous or flaky bark on the trunk and larger branches, smooth bark above, broadly lance-shaped to egg-shaped leaves, flower buds in groups of seven, white or pale yellow flowers and conical fruit.

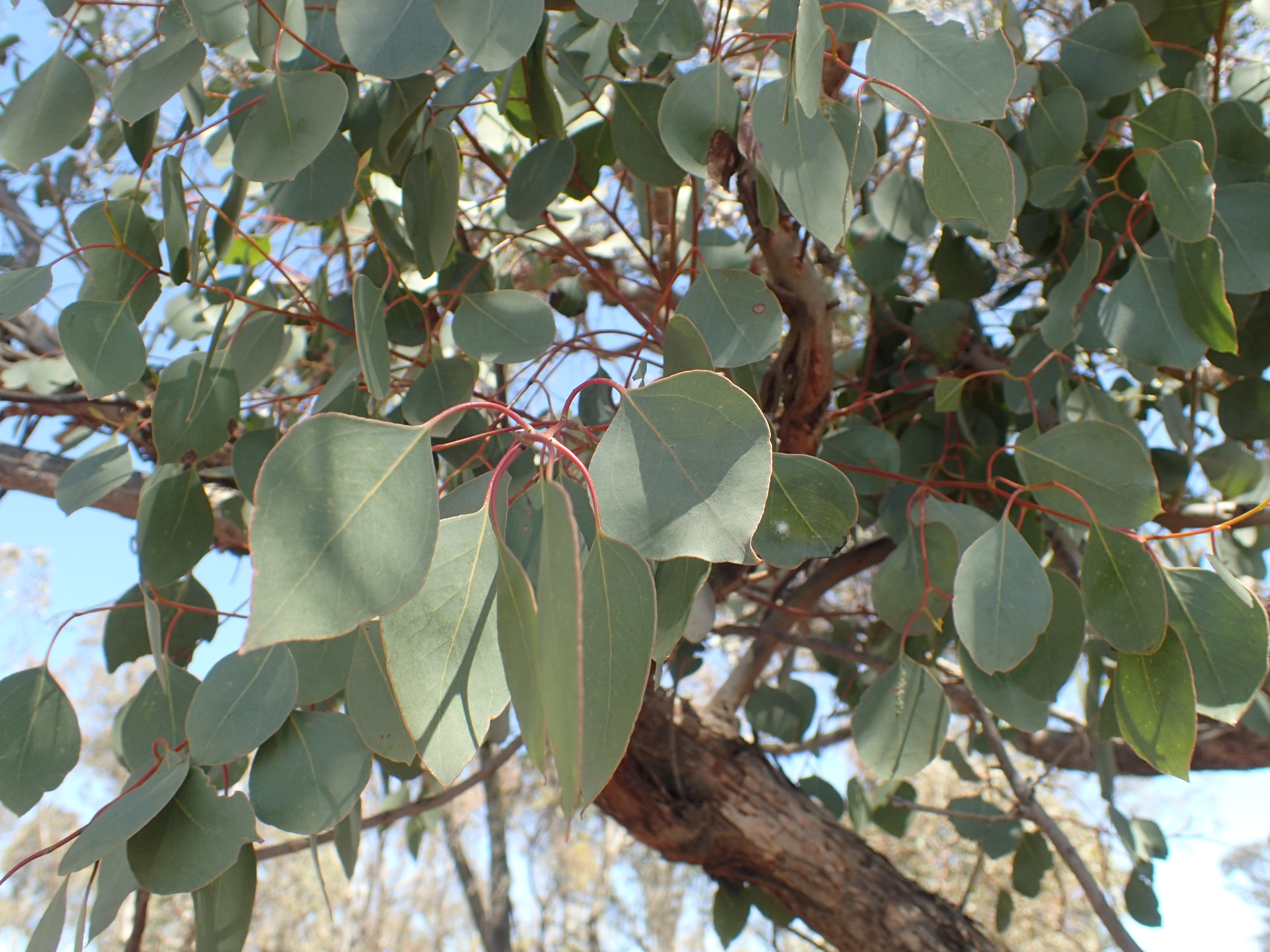
Adult leaves

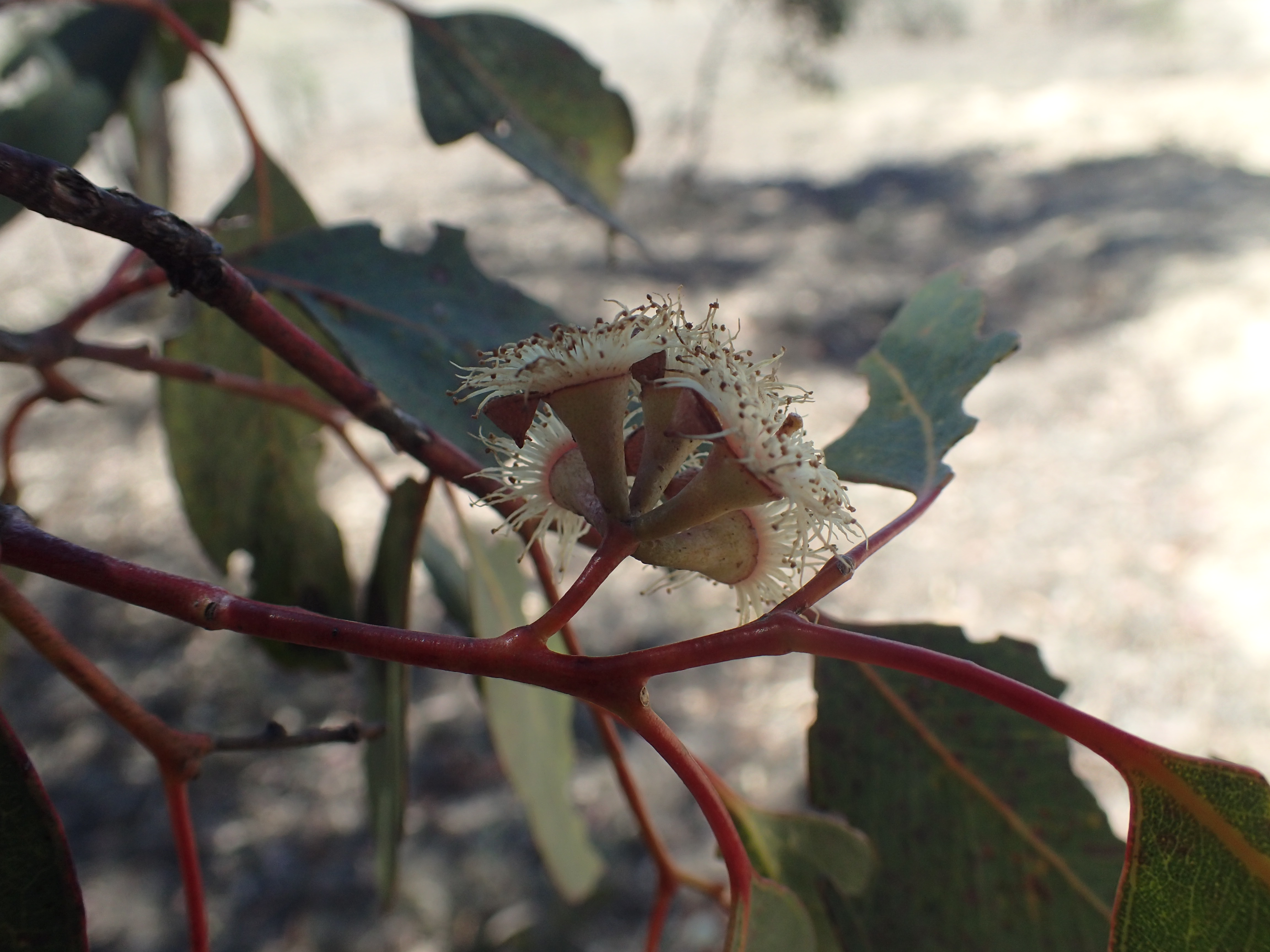
Flowers

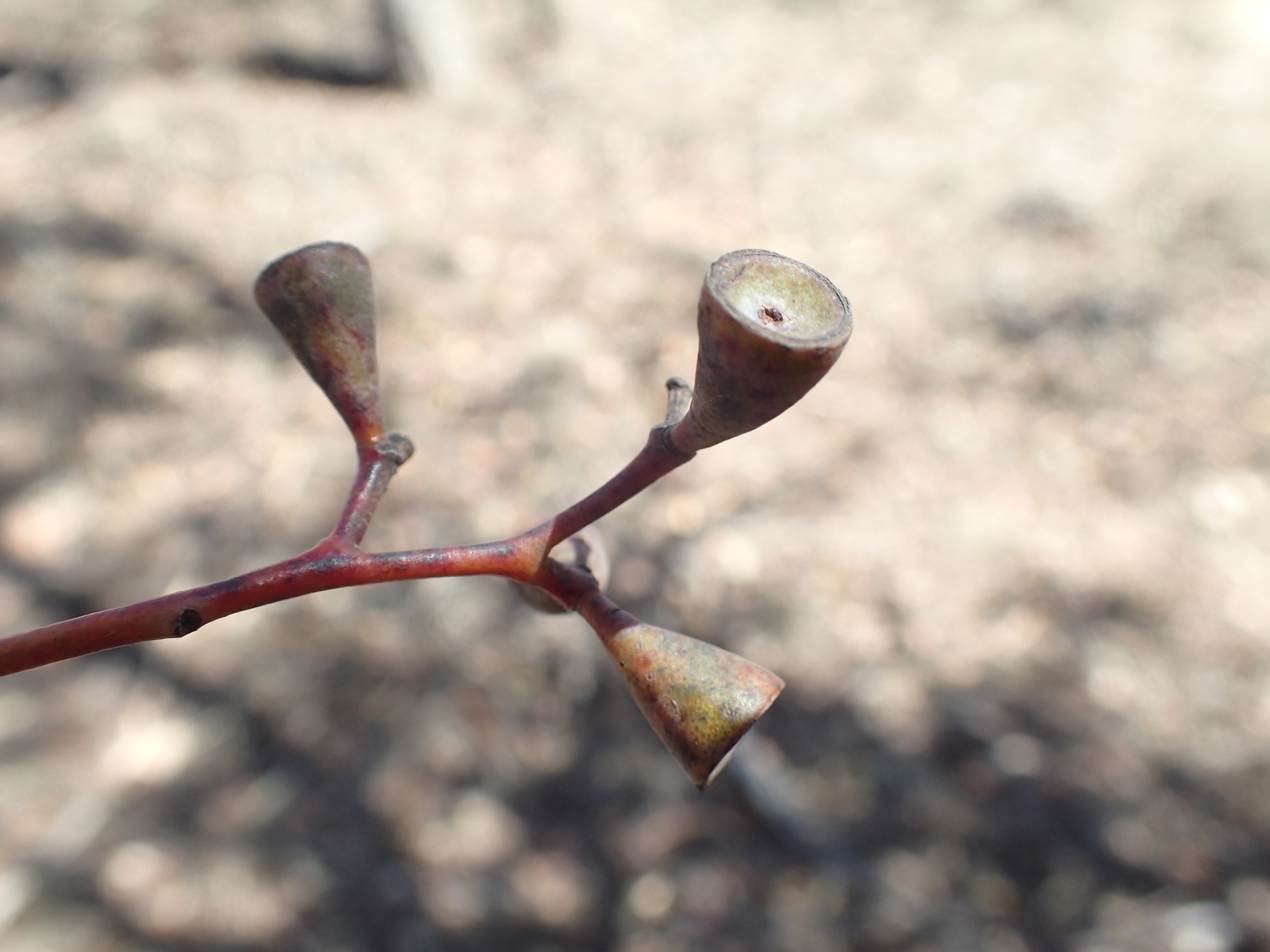
Fruit

== Description ==
Eucalyptus magnificata is a tree or a mallee that typically grows to a height of 8–15 m (26–49 ft) and forms a lignotuber. It has rough, fibrous or flaky bark on the trunk and larger branches, smooth greyish bark above. Young plants and coppice regrowth have egg-shaped to more or less round leaves that are 35–80 mm (1.4–3.1 in) long and 35–65 mm (1.4–2.6 in) wide. Adult leaves are broadly lance-shaped to egg-shaped, the same shade of green on both sides, 50–150 mm (2.0–5.9 in) long and 30–65 mm (1.2–2.6 in) wide, tapering to a petiole 10–30 mm (0.39–1.18 in) long. The flower buds are arranged in groups of seven, either in leaf axils or on the end of branchlets, sometimes on a branching peduncle. The peduncle is 7–13 mm (0.28–0.51 in) long and the individual buds are on pedicels 1–4 mm (0.039–0.157 in) long. Mature buds are oval, sometimes glaucous, about 5 mm (0.20 in) long and 3–5 mm (0.12–0.20 in) wide with a conical to beaked operculum. Flowering occurs in June and November and the flowers are white, pale yellow or lemon-coloured. The fruit is a woody, conical capsule 5–9 mm (0.20–0.35 in) long wide with the valves enclosed below a thin rim.

== Taxonomy and naming ==
Eucalyptus magnificata was first formally described in 1990 by Lawrie Johnson and Ken Hill from a specimen collected by Richard Cambage near Uralla in 1917. The specific epithet (magnificata) is a Latin word meaning "magnified", referring to the leaves, buds and fruit which are larger than in related eucalypts.

== Distribution and habitat ==
Blue box grows in grassy woodland on shallow soils near Armidale in New South Wales and Stanthorpe in south-eastern Queensland.

== Conservation status ==
This eucalypt is classified as "endangered" under the New South Wales Government Biodiversity Conservation Act 2016. The IUCN Red List assesses the species as Vulnerable.
