= University Heights (film) =

- Directed by: Scott Beck
- Written by: Scott Beck
- Produced by: Bryan Woods; Scott Beck
- Starring: Jim Siokos; Shane Simmons; Travis Shepherd; Sabien Minteer; Justin Marxen; Lindsey Husak; Casey Campbell; Brad Fandel
- Music by: Matthew Florianz; Vincent Gillioz; Burn Disco Burn
- Distributed by: Bluebox Limited Films
- Release date: June 26, 2004
- Running time: 96 minutes
- Country: United States
- Language: English

University Heights is a 2004 American drama film written and directed by Scott Beck (in his feature directorial debut). University Heights boasts a sweeping ensemble cast in the story of four lives on a college campus - a drug-dealing professor, a teacher struggling with his homosexuality, a drug-abusing student, and a bigot trying to escape his hateful tendencies. Chronicled with tales of love, loss, abuse, and frayed relationships, University Heights is ultimately a story of redemption. The film was shot entirely in Iowa and many scenes were filmed at the University of Iowa. Beck and partner Bryan Woods secured a deal with MTV Films after winning MTVU's Best Film on Campus competition with the film.

== Cast ==
- Jim Siokos as Tom
- Shane Simmons as Grant
- Travis Shepherd as Jake
- Sabien Minteer as Brent
- Justin Marxen as Tim
- Lindsey Husak as Katie
- Casey Campbell as Lou
- Brad Fandel as Frank
