= Scott Beck and Bryan Woods =

American filmmaking duo

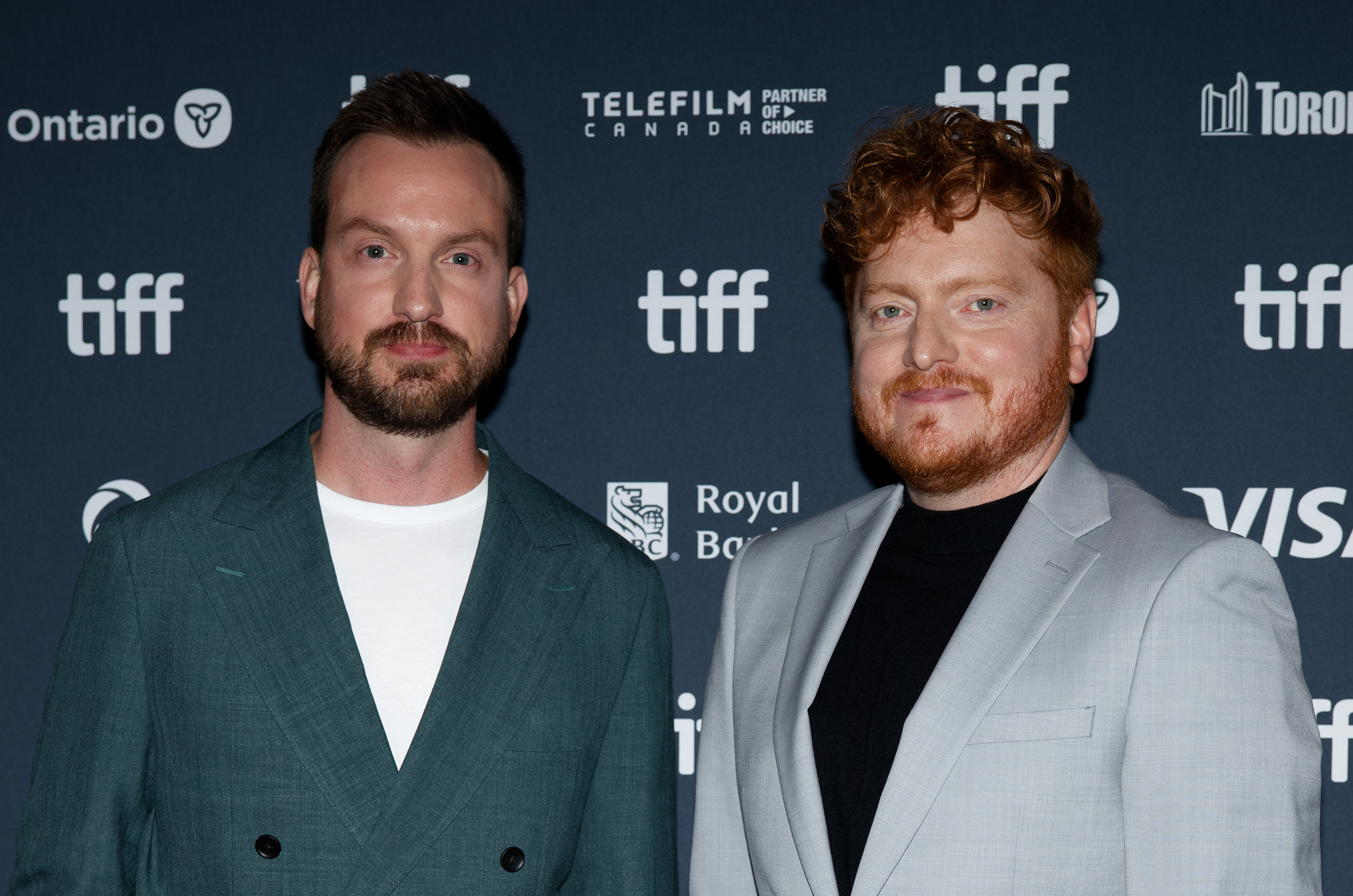
- Beck and Woods at the 2024 Toronto International Film Festival
- Born: Scott Beck; October 22, 1984 (age 41); Denver, Colorado, U.S. Bryan Woods; September 14, 1984 (age 42); Davenport, Iowa, U.S.
- Education: University of Iowa
- Occupations: Writers; directors; producers
- Years active: 2001–present

Scott Beck (born October 22, 1984) and Bryan Woods (born September 14, 1984) are American filmmakers. They created the story for and co-wrote the post-apocalyptic horror film A Quiet Place (2018), and wrote and directed the supernatural thriller Nightlight (2015), the slasher film Haunt (2019), the science fiction film 65 (2023), and the psychological horror film Heretic (2024).

== Lives and careers ==
Beck was born in Denver, Colorado and Woods was born in Davenport, Iowa. Both were raised in Bettendorf, Iowa. While attending the University of Iowa together, the two founded Bluebox Films and made the films Her Summer and University Heights. The pair secured a development deal with MTV Films after winning MTVU's Best Film on Campus competition with the film.

In 2015, Beck and Woods wrote and directed Nightlight, released by Lionsgate. In 2016, Beck and Woods sold their original screenplay for A Quiet Place to Paramount Pictures. The film stars Emily Blunt and John Krasinski, the latter of whom also directed and co-wrote the script. A Quiet Place was released in April 2018 to critical acclaim; it has a Rotten Tomatoes approval rating of 95%. It became a major box office hit, grossing over $330 million worldwide.

The duo also wrote and directed the thriller Haunt, produced by Eli Roth. In June 2018, Beck and Woods signed on to write and executive-produce a film adaptation of Stephen King's short story The Boogeyman for 20th Century Fox and 21 Laps Entertainment. Beck & Woods developed the television series Zeroes for Sony Pictures Television and Davis Entertainment. The series is based on the novel by the New York Times best-selling author Scott Westerfeld, Margo Lanagan, and Deborah Biancotti.

In May 2020, it was announced that Beck and Woods would write, direct, and produce 65 for Sony Pictures and producer Sam Raimi. The film stars Adam Driver.

In June 2023, it was reported that Hugh Grant would star in Beck and Woods' next film Heretic, which they wrote, directed, and produced for A24.

== Other business ventures ==
Beck and Woods are co-owners of The Last Picture House, an independent arthouse cinema in Davenport, Iowa.

== Filmography ==
=== Feature film ===
| Year | Title | Director | Writer | Producer | Notes |
|---|---|---|---|---|---|
| 2003 | Lost/Found | Beck | Beck | Yes | Beck is also credited as editor Woods is also credited as assistant director |
| 2004 | For Always | Woods | Woods | Yes | Woods is also credited as cinematographer, editor and appears as "David Dunne" |
| 2004 | Her Summer | Woods | Woods | Yes | Woods is also credited as cinematographer and editor |
| 2004 | University Heights | Beck | Beck | Yes | Beck is also credited as editor and appears as "Usher"; Woods is also credited as assistant director and appears as "Teen #1" |
| 2006 | The Bride Wore Blood | Yes | Yes | Yes | Both also credited as editors |
| 2015 | Nightlight | Yes | Yes | No | |
| 2018 | A Quiet Place | No | Yes | Executive | Nominated — Critics' Choice Movie Award for Best Original Screenplay; Nominated — WGA Award for Best Original Screenplay |
| 2019 | Haunt | Yes | Yes | No | |
| 2023 | 65 | Yes | Yes | Yes | |
| 2023 | The Boogeyman | No | Yes | Executive | |
| 2024 | Heretic | Yes | Yes | Yes | Nominated — Independent Spirit Award for Best Screenplay |

=== Short film ===
| Year | Title | Director | Writer | Producer | Editor | Notes |
|---|---|---|---|---|---|---|
| 2002 | Yearbook | Yes | Yes | Yes | Yes | Beck also appears as "Andrew" |
| 2002 | Remembering November | Beck | Beck | Yes | Beck | Woods is also credited as assistant director |
| 2004 | Amber | Yes | Yes | Yes | Yes | |
| 2004 | Shades | Yes | Yes | Yes | Yes | |
| 2007 | Imperium | No | No | No | Woods | Woods is also credited as sound editor |
| 2009 | Francis | No | No | No | No | Woods is only credited as cinematographer and appears as "Detective #2" |
| 2010 | Impulse | Yes | Yes | Yes | No | |

=== Television ===
| Year | Title | Director | Writer | Producer | Notes |
|---|---|---|---|---|---|
| 2012 | Spread | Yes | Yes | Yes | TV movie |
| 2020 | 50 States of Fright | Yes | Yes | Consulting | Episode "Almost There" (Part 1, 2 and 3) |
