= While I'm Dead Feed the Dog =

2000 novel by Ric Browde

- Author: Ric Browde
- Language: English
- Publisher: HarperCollins
- Publication date: 2000
- Publication place: U.S.
- Media type: Print (paperback)
- Pages: 256
- ISBN: 0-006-51374-3
- OCLC: 43672593

While I'm Dead Feed the Dog is a comedic novel written by American author Ric Browde, first published in 1994 and in 1997 by Coment Publishing as a CDZeene, with text and music, and in 2000 by HarperCollins.

== Summary ==
16-year-old Ric Thibault opens his mother's attempted suicide note that simply says: "While I'm dead...feed the dog." He can't stop laughing while the paramedics haul her away. While trying to get into the pants of the most beautiful girl in the world, his crush, Nina Pennington, Thibault ends up in the back of a limo on the road to rock 'n' roll fame opening up for David Bowie. But on the way there he stumbles upon a few things: a few dead Mafia hitmen, a nymphomaniac next door, dying Latin teachers, narcoleptic nuns, police, evil lawyers, buffoon reporters, televangelists and greedy relatives.

== Film adaptation ==
In July 2012, it was announced that the film adaptation of the book, Behaving Badly, would start filming in Los Angeles. The movie was released in the United States in August, 2014, with a screenplay written by director Tim Garrick, starring Selena Gomez as Nina Pennington and Nat Wolff as Ric Thibault.

Browde has publicly disavowed the film as going against the source material of his book.
