= Vanaprasta =

American indie rock quintet formed in 2009

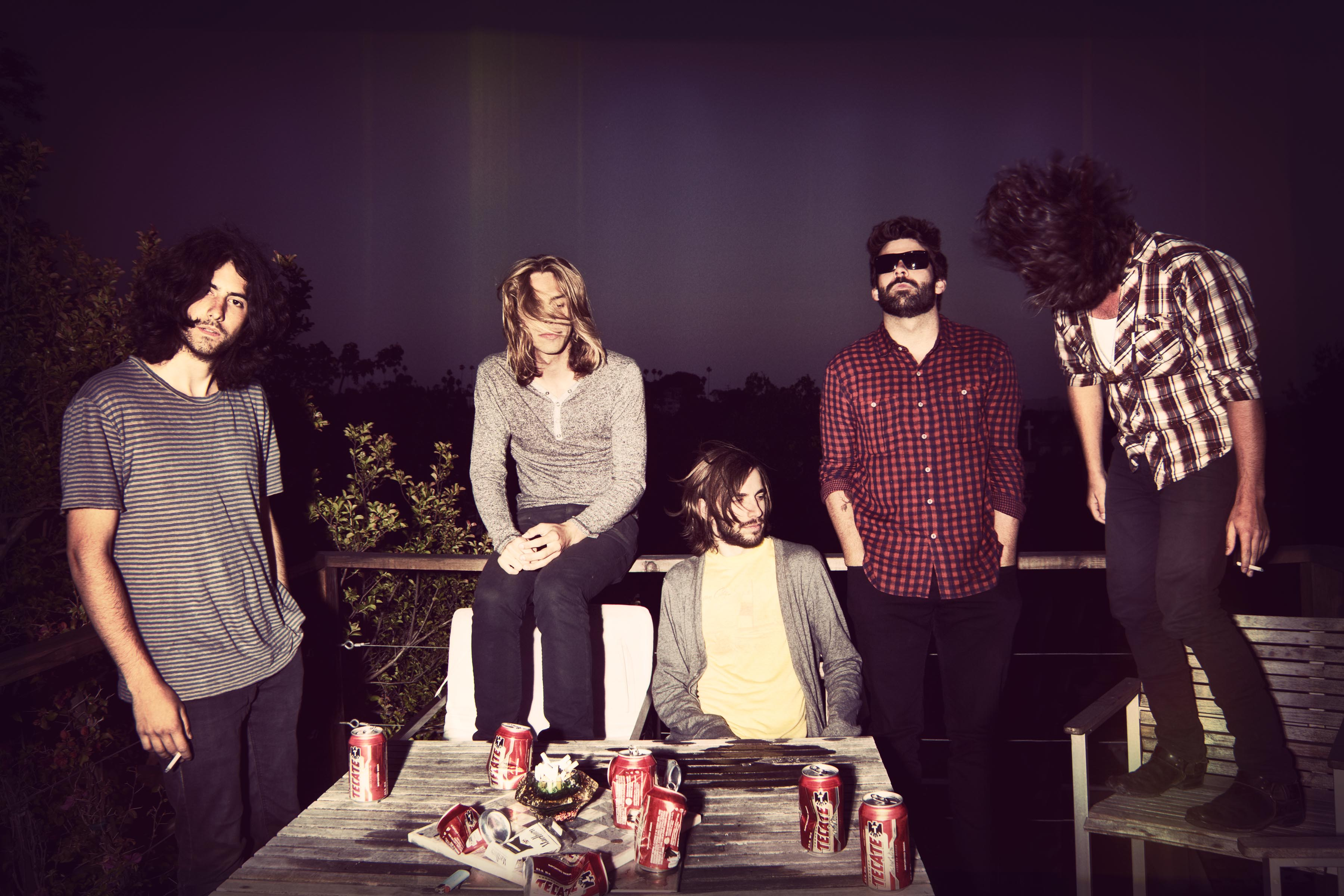

Background information
- Origin: Los Angeles, California, United States
- Genres: Indie rock
- Years active: 2009-present
- Labels: Unsigned
- Members: Steven Wilkin (vocals/keys); Collin Desha (guitar/vocals/keys); Taylor Brown (bass/vocals); Cameron Dmytryk (guitar); Ben Smiley (drums)
- Website: www.vanaprasta.com

Vanaprasta is an American indie rock quintet from Los Angeles, California, consisting of Steven Wilkin (vocals/keys), Collin Desha (guitar/vocals/keys), Taylor Brown (bass/vocals/keys), Cameron Dmytryk (guitar), and Ben Smiley (drums).

== History ==
Vanaprasta otherwise known as Biig Booty, was formed in 2009, and the quintet's debut EP Forming the Shapes was released a year later. Lead single "Color of Sin" was featured on the Download to Donate for Haiti compilation presented by Music For Relief and Causecast in February 2011. They contributed a cover of LCD Soundsystem's track "All My Friends" for Uncovering a Cure, a compilation album benefitting AIDS Project Los Angeles.

=== Healthy Geometry - Present ===
Following a strong run of shows at CMJ in October 2011, on 11.1.11 Vanaprasta released its debut full-length Healthy Geometry to critical acclaim. Produced by Dave Schiffman, the album was recorded live with minimal overdubs. They celebrated the release with a month-long sold-out residency at The Satellite (formerly Spaceland) in Silver Lake.

On November 6, 2012 Vanaprasta partnered with Spotify for a second time to release Spotify Sessions - a five track live EP released exclusively to Spotify's audience. The band is currently in the studio recording their second album, and played their final show of 2012 at The Satellite in Silver Lake on December 14

On July JULY 1, 2015 Vanaprasta changed names to Sun Drug according to LA weekly However, it's unclear when Vanaprasta changed their name officially because they premiered a song on June 4, 2015 on LA Buzz bands

== Television appearances ==
Vanaprasta made their national television debut on Fuel TV's "The Daily Habit" on November 9, 2011.

== Discography ==
- Forming the Shapes EP (2009)
- Healthy Geometry (2011)
- Effie House Sessions (2012)
- Spotify Sessions (2012)
