= Marcquelle Ward =

British actor, dancer and rapper (born 1983)

- Born: Baby Caton; Manchester, England
- Occupation(s): Actor, dancer, rapper
- Years active: 1994–present
- Website: http://www.marcquelleward.com/

Marcquelle Jermaine Ward (born 8 November 1983 as Baby Caton) is a British actor, dancer and rapper. He's known for the role of "BB" on the musical TV drama series Britannia High and for playing Rum Tum Tugger in the 2015 West End revival of Cats.

== Filmography ==
- 2014 Banana : Paul Lumb
- 2013 Pat and Cabbage : Rob
- 2012 The World According to Mya : Marcquelle
- 2011 McQueen : Liam
- 2011 Tati's Hotel: Bipper
- 2011 Tracy Beaker Returns: You Choose - Cyberbullying (interactive web series) : Boyfriend
- 2010 Doctors: Lucas Jones
- 2009 Coronation Street: Mitch
- 2008 The National Television Awards 2008: Himself
- 2008 Britannia High: "BB"
- 2007 DanceX: Himself
