= Sapphire Elia =

British actress

- Occupations: Actress, model, singer
- Years active: 1996–present

Sapphire Elia is an English actress, model and singer. On television, she is known for her roles in ITV musical drama Britannia High (2008) and soap opera Emmerdale (2010–2011).

== Early and personal life ==
Elia is from North London. She is of part Greek-Cypriot heritage.

Elia became engaged in summer 2021.

== Career ==
Elia modelled for brands such as Dolce & Gabbana, Selfridges and Debenhams from the age of three. She later went on to appear in a number of adverts. In 1996, Elia began attending the Sylvia Young Theatre School. She was cast in the role of a young Cosette in Trevor Nunn's theatre production of Les Misérables at the Palace Theatre.

In 1998, Elia became an entertainer on ITV's Fun Song Factory for one series. Two years later she became a presenter on Discovery Kids, which led to a two-hour reality show called Blast Off, where she attended the NASA Astronaut Training Camp for children. In 2002, Elia played Isabelle in the educational series, Energy for Pearson Education. The following year, she graduated from Sylvia Young.

In 2006, the actress was cast as Gemma Craig in the television drama series Dream Team. Elia played two Polly Delwar and Kerry in two separate stints in The Bill.

In 2008, Elia successfully auditioned for the musical drama series Britannia High. A year later, Elia played Snow White in a Christmas pantomime at the Richmond Theatre. In 2010, the actress played the role of Amber in the movie Black Forest for the Syfy channel. In September of that year, Elia joined the cast of Emmerdale as Mia Macey. In May 2011, Elia confirmed her departure from Emmerdale.

Sapphire appeared on second cover to Image 34 magazine in June 2012.

In July 2020 Sapphire and her partner Matthew set up a Consulting Agency called "alterniq inspired growth" with the Slogan, "We aim to help companies uncover talent within their workforce through a range of specialised programmes".

Elia returned to the stage in 2021 and 2022.

== Filmography ==
Film & Television Roles
Year	Title	Role	Notes
1998	Fun Song Factory	Herself/Entertainer	3 episodes
2000	Discovery Kids	Herself/Presenter	
2000	Blast Off	Herself	2-hour Reality Show
2002	Energy	Isabelle	Educational Program
2006	Dream Team	Gemma Craig	Television Drama Series
2010	The Bill	Polly Delwar / Kerry	2 separate stints, TV series.
2008	Britannia High	Claudine Cameron	9 episodes, series regular.
2010–2011	Emmerdale	Mia Macey	November 2010 – August 2011
2012	Black Forest	Amber	Television movie.
2013	Invasion of the Not Quite Dead	Alison	British feature movie in pre-production
2016	Undercover Hooligan	Karolina Turner	British feature film
2018	I Am Vengeance	Rose Campbell	

=== Theatre ===
Year	Location	Title	Role	Notes
2009/10	Richmond Theatre, Surrey	Snow White	Snow White	4 Dec 2009 - 10 Jan 2010
2010/11	The Hexagon Theatre, Reading	Sleeping Beauty	Princess Belle	
2011/12	Hazlitt Theatre, Maidstone	Aladdin	Princess Jasmine	
2012	National Tour	The Importance of Being Earnest	Cecily Cardew	Production by The Middle Ground Theatre Company Ltd
2012	Ipswich Regent Theatre, Ipswich	Snow White	Snow White	21 Dec 2012 - 30 December 2012
2016/17	Lighthouse, Poole	Aladdin	Princess Xiaoxue	
2017/18	Sevenoaks, Stag Theatre	Snow White	Snow White	
2018	Carriageworks Theatre, Leeds	Beauty and the Beast	Belle	Fri 23 Nov - Mon 31 Dec 2018
Spring 2019	National Tour	The Wizard of Oz	Dorothy	Shone Productions, National Theatre Tour, Total of 14 Dates on the tour
2019/20	Palace Theatre, Redditch	Cinderella	Cinderella	9 Dec 2019 - 5 Jan 2020
