= Matthew James Thomas =

British actor

- Born: Matthew James Elwyn Thomas; 3 March 1988 (age 38); Buckinghamshire, UK
- Education: Italia Conti Academy of Theatre Arts
- Occupation: Actor
- Years active: 1999–present

Matthew James Elwyn Thomas (born 3 March 1988), also occasionally credited as Matthew Thomas, is a British actor who has made appearances in television, film, and theater. He is known for his television roles including The Lost Prince, and the ITV drama-musical show, Britannia High. In the U.S., Thomas is best known for having played the title role in the 2013 Broadway revival of Pippin, which received a Tony Award for Best Revival of a Musical. He was also a late addition to the U.S. national tour of Pippin in 2014. He had his Broadway debut in 2010 playing Peter Parker in Spider-Man: Turn Off the Dark directed by Julie Taymor, with music by U2's Bono and The Edge.

In 2013, Thomas was nominated for an Outer Critics Circle Award for Outstanding Actor in a Musical for his performance in the title role in Pippin, and, in 2015, he was nominated for a Helen Hayes Award for Outstanding Lead Actor in a Musical for his performance as Fenwick in the Barry Levinson-produced musical, Diner. In 2016 he performed the role of Riff in West Side Story at the Hollywood Bowl with the LA Philharmonic orchestra, conducted by Gustavo Dudamel, alongside fellow Broadway actors Jeremy Jordan and Karen Olivo.

== Early life and education ==
Thomas trained at the Sylvia Young Theatre School in London and later at the Italia Conti Academy of Theatre Arts also in London. He grew up largely in Buckinghamshire, England. His first professional acting job came at the age of eight when he played Kipper in a production of Oliver! in the West End. As a child, he also appeared as Simon in Billy Elliot and in About a Boy, starring Hugh Grant. Additionally, Thomas made frequent appearances on numerous British television shows, including Wonderful You, The Bill, Bad Girls, and Stephen Poliakoff's The Lost Prince, among others.

== Career ==
For much of his early career, Thomas worked on the screen and stage in films, television shows, musicals, and plays. Prior to coming to Broadway, Thomas acted in numerous London-based and West End plays. He had a featured role as Clarence in Andrew Lloyd Webber's musical version of Whistle Down the Wind. Other UK roles include: Schlomo in Fame, directed by Karen Bruce, Wayne in an adaption of Ben Elton's Novel – Popcorn, directed by Lee Morgan at the Landor Fringe Theatre, Romeo and Juliet, and Dick Whittington, directed by award-winning director Gillian Lynne.

In 2008, Thomas was cast as Jeremy (Jez) Tyler in the ITV television drama musical, Britannia High, created by Arlene Phillips. Over 3,000 people auditioned for roles as one of the six lead characters on the show. The series ran for nine episodes in the latter half of 2008. Less than a year later, Thomas earned the title role in the musical adaptation of Oscar Wilde's The Picture of Dorian Gray. The musical ran from 2 July to 2 August 2009 at the Leicester Square Theatre. It was directed by Linnie Reedman and the music composed by Joe Evans.

In 2010, Thomas appeared in an episode of the ITV series, Midsomer Murders alongside John Nettles, Sylvestra Le Touzel, Lydia Wilson, and Richard Fleeshman. Also in 2010, Thomas ventured to New York City and Broadway where he earned a role as the alternate lead in Julie Taymor's Spider-Man: Turn Off the Dark. Thomas played Peter Parker/Spider-Man for two performances each week while Reeve Carney took on the role six times per week. The play was staged at the Lyric Theatre, which, at the time, was known as the Foxwoods Theatre. In November 2011, Thomas was injured backstage during a Wednesday matinee performance. The injury was not considered serious.

Thomas' final performance as Spider-Man was on 10 November 2012. He left the show to perform in the lead role in the American Repertory Theater's revival of Pippin, directed by Diane Paulus. In 2013, the show moved from Cambridge, Massachusetts to the Music Box Theatre on Broadway. It officially opened at the Music Box on 25 April 2013. During the show's Broadway run, Thomas starred in eight shows each week, alongside co-stars Patina Miller, Terrence Mann, and Andrea Martin. Pippin won the Tony Award for Best Revival of a Musical in 2013.

In 2013, Thomas released a three-track EP of original songs entitled, No Sound at All. The album was produced by Duncan Sheik. In early 2014, it was reported that Thomas was in contention for the lead role in the upcoming film, Star Wars: The Force Awakens. At the end of Pippin's Broadway run in 2014, Thomas joined his parents in Malta for their anniversary celebration. Almost immediately after arriving, he received a phone call asking him to reprise his role as Pippin for the U.S. national tour, which was opening in Denver in eight days. Kyle Selig, the actor originally hired to play Pippin for the tour, had been put on vocal rest. Thomas filled in and continued in the role for later dates on the tour, including those for Los Angeles and San Francisco.

In late 2014 and early 2015, Thomas starred as Fenwick in a musical adaptation of Barry Levinson's 1982 film, Diner. The play was produced by Levinson and Scott Landis, and the music was written by Sheryl Crow. The musical was developed at the Signature Theatre in Arlington, Virginia and was directed by Kathleen Marshall. The play was well-received and sold out its entire run at the Signature Theatre.

In March 2015, Thomas appeared as Henry Paine in a pilot episode for a planned HBO drama series, The Devil You Know, co-created by Orange Is the New Black creator Jenji Kohan, but the series was not picked up and the pilot went unaired. In 2017 he appeared in the main cast of another pilot episode, for a planned medical drama, Shelter, created by Law & order veteran Warren Leight, but the series was again not picked up. In 2024 he began starring as Harry Potter in Harry Potter and the Cursed Child on Broadway.

== Recognition and awards ==
Thomas played the title role in Pippin, which won the 2013 Tony Award for Best Revival of a Musical. The musical was nominated for a total of 10 awards and won 4. Thomas' performance in Pippin earned him a nomination for Outstanding Lead Actor in a Musical by the Outer Critics Circle Awards. In 2015, Thomas was nominated for the Helen Hayes Award for Outstanding Lead Actor in a Musical (HAYES Production) for his performance in Diner.

== List of credits ==
=== Television ===
Year	Title	Role	Network	Notes
1999	Wonderful You	Joe, Henry's nephew	ITV	Mini-series
1999	The Bill	Karl Drake	ITV	Series 15 episode 25 "Look Away Now"
2000	Bad Girls	Tom Fenner	ITV	Series 2 episode 3 "Visiting Time"
2000	Care	Brian	BBC	Drama
2002	Spooks	Demonstrator	BBC One	Series 1 episode 4 "Traitor's Gate"
2003	The Lost Prince	Prince John (older)	BBC One	Drama
2003	Trevor's World of Sport	Toby	BBC One	Mini-series
2004	Shane	Spotty kid	ITV	Series 1 episode 2
2005	Afterlife	Bardo's Lawyer	ITV	Series 1 episode 2 "Lower Than Bones"
2007	Desperados	Gary Black	CBBC	Series 1 episode 10
2007	Doctors	Mickey Carly	BBC One	Series 9 episode 39 "Victim Support"
2007	Genie in the House	Dave	Nickelodeon	Series 2 episode 22 "Mr Write"
2008	Britannia High	Jez Tyler	ITV	Main cast
2010	Casualty	Gary Yates	BBC One	Series 24 episode 24 "Love Is A Battlefield"
2010	Midsomer Murders	Orlando Guest	ITV	Series 13 episode 5 "Master Class"

=== Theatre credits ===
Year	Title	Role	Theatre	Director(s)	Ref.
2009	The Picture of Dorian Gray	Dorian Gray	Leicester Square Theatre	Linnie Reedman	
2010–12	Spider-Man: Turn Off the Dark	Peter Parker/Spider-Man (alternate)	Foxwoods Theatre	Julie Taymor	
2012	Pippin	Pippin	American Repertory Theater	Diane Paulus	
2013	Pippin	Pippin	Music Box Theatre	Diane Paulus	
2014	Pippin	Pippin	U.S. National Tour	Diane Paulus	
2015	Diner	Fenwick	Signature Theatre	Kathleen Marshall	
2016	Diner	Fenwick	Delaware Theatre Company	Kathleen Marshall	
2016	West Side Story	Riff	Hollywood Bowl	Gustavo Dudamel	
2017	Time and the Conways	Robin Conway	American Airlines Theatre	Rebecca Taichman	
2024–25	Harry Potter and the Cursed Child	Harry Potter	Lyric Theatre	John Tiffany	

=== Film ===
Year	Title	Role
2000	The Blind Date	Matthew Davey
2000	Billy Elliot	Simon
2002	About a Boy	Candy thrower

=== Discography ===
- Overrated Life (2005)
