= David Lee Roth discography =

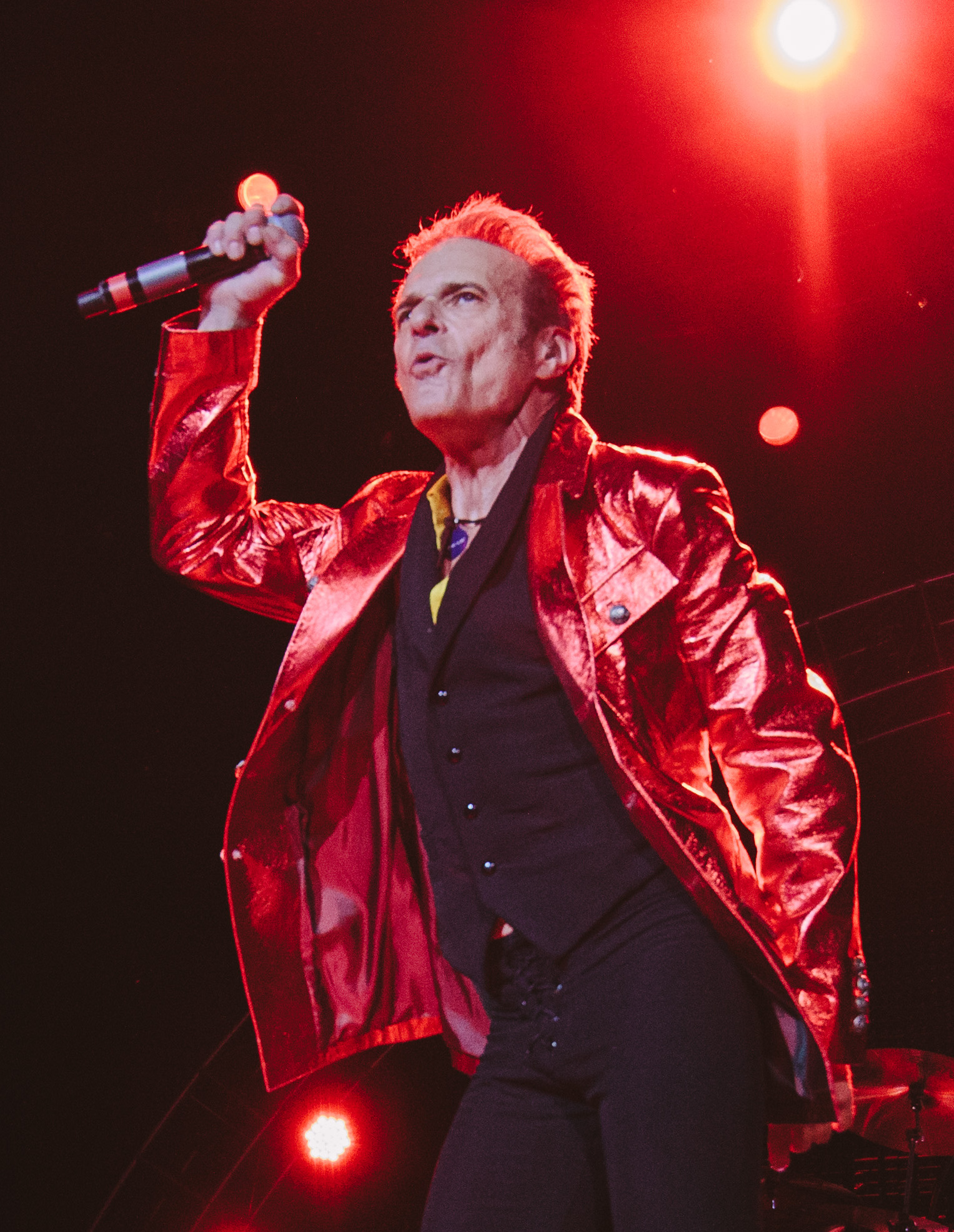
- Studio albums: 6
- Compilation albums: 2
- Singles: 22
- No. 1 singles: 1

David Lee Roth is an American rock singer best known as the lead singer of Van Halen. His solo discography consists of six studio albums, one extended play, one compilation album, and 20 singles. Of his eight albums, four have been certified Gold or higher by the Recording Industry Association of America. Eat 'Em and Smile, Skyscraper, and Crazy from the Heat are certified Platinum, and A Little Ain't Enough is certified Gold.

Roth has released 20 singles, with four of those reaching the Top 40 on the US Billboard Hot 100. His debut single, 1985's "California Girls", reached number 3 on Hot 100, and 1988's "Just Like Paradise" reached number 6 on the same chart. "Just Like Paradise" is also Roth's first (and only to date) number-one single on any Billboard chart. It reached number one on the Billboard Hot Mainstream Rock Tracks chart. Most of his singles have experienced international chart success, most notably in Canada and New Zealand, where Roth has several Top 20 hits in both countries.

Since the release of Diamond Dave (2003), Roth has put out many non-album singles since 2020, but released no further albums. In 2006, he re-joined Van Halen—the band that he helped propel to international superstardom—and then toured extensively. Roth's first full-length album with Van Halen since 1984, A Different Kind of Truth, was released in February 2012 to widespread commercial and critical success.

12 of Roth's albums have been certified Gold in the US by the RIAA and 11 have been certified Platinum in the US by the RIAA (Van Halen and solo combined).

== Albums ==
=== Studio albums ===
Title	Details	Peak chart positions													Sales	Certifications
Title	Details	US	US Indie	AUS	CAN	FIN	GE	NL	NO	NZ	JP	SWE	SWI	UK	Sales	Certifications
Eat 'Em and Smile	Released: July 7, 1986; Label: Warner Bros.; Formats: LP, cassette	4	—	26	13	5	51	57	17	50	9	12	29	28		RIAA: Platinum; BPI: Gold
Skyscraper	Released: January 26, 1988; Label: Warner Bros.; Formats: LP, cassette	6	—	15	6	1	28	39	9	12	7	13	13	11		RIAA: Platinum; BPI: Gold
A Little Ain't Enough	Released: January 15, 1991; Label: Warner Bros.; Formats: CD, cassette	18	—	26	21	1	12	30	9	—	17	11	5	4		RIAA: Gold; BPI: Silver; MC: Gold
Your Filthy Little Mouth	Released: March 8, 1994; Label: Warner Bros.; Formats: CD, cassette	78	—	91	—	12	62	—	—	—	26	23	25	28	US: 61,782	
DLR Band	Released: June 9, 1998; Label: Wawazat!!; Formats: CD, cassette	172	—	—	—	—	—	—	—	—	—	—	—	—	US: 51,612	
Diamond Dave	Released: July 8, 2003; Label: Magna Carta; Formats: CD	—	18	—	—	—	—	—	—	—	—	—	—	—		
"—" denotes a recording that did not chart or was not released in that territory.

=== Compilation albums ===
Title	Details	Peak chart positions	
Title	Details	US	FIN
The Best	Released: October 28, 1997; Label: Warner Bros.; Formats: CD, cassette	199	30
Greatest Hits/The Deluxe Edition	Released: November 19, 2013; Label: Friday Music; Formats: CD	—	—

== Extended plays ==
Title	Details	Peak chart positions						Certifications
Title	Details	US	CAN	FIN	NZ	JP	UK	Certifications
Crazy from the Heat	Released: January 28, 1985; Label: Warner Bros.; Formats: LP, cassette	15	14	21	21	18	91	RIAA: Platinum

== Singles ==
Title	Year	Peak chart positions								Album
Title	Year	US	US Rock	AUS	CAN	FIN	NL	NZ	UK	Album
"California Girls" (Note: "California Girls" also peaked at number 29 on the US Billboard Adult Contemporary chart.)	1985	3	3	6	8	—	44	7	68	Crazy from the Heat
"Easy Street" [airplay]	1985	—	14	—	—	—	—	—	—	Crazy from the Heat
"Just a Gigolo/I Ain't Got Nobody"	1985	12	25	13	7	—	—	6	—	Crazy from the Heat
"Yankee Rose"	1986	16	10	33	29	10	—	—	—	Eat 'Em and Smile
"Goin' Crazy!"	1986	66	12	—	—	—	—	—	—	Eat 'Em and Smile
"That's Life"	1986	85	—	—	—	—	—	—	—	Eat 'Em and Smile
"Tobacco Road" [US promo]	1986	—	10	—	—	—	—	—	—	Eat 'Em and Smile
"I'm Easy"	1986	—	—	—	—	—	—	—	—	Eat 'Em and Smile
"Just Like Paradise"	1987	6	1	14	8	6	77	13	27	Skyscraper
"Knucklebones" [US promo]	1988	—	45	—	—	—	—	—	—	Skyscraper
"Stand Up"	1988	64	5	—	—	—	—	—	72	Skyscraper
"Damn Good"	1988	—	2	—	—	—	—	—	—	Skyscraper
"A Lil' Ain't Enough"	1991	—	3	42	41	4	58	—	32	A Little Ain't Enough
"Sensible Shoes"	1991	—	6	153	48	—	—	—	81	A Little Ain't Enough
"Tell the Truth" [US promo]	1991	—	39	—	—	—	—	—	—	A Little Ain't Enough
"She's My Machine"	1994	—	12	—	—	10	—	—	64	Your Filthy Little Mouth
"Night Life"	1994	—	—	—	—	—	—	—	72	Your Filthy Little Mouth
"Don't Piss Me Off" [US promo]	1997	—	33	—	—	—	—	—	—	The Best
"Slam Dunk" [airplay]	1998	—	11	—	—	—	—	—	—	DLR Band
"Somewhere over the Rainbow Bar and Grill"	2020	—	—	—	—	—	—	—	—	Non-album singles
"Giddy - Up!"	2021	—	—	—	—	—	—	—	—	Non-album singles
"Lo-Rez Sunset"	2021	—	—	—	—	—	—	—	—	Non-album singles
"Pointing at the Moon"	2022	—	—	—	—	—	—	—	—	Non-album singles
"Nothing Could Have Stopped Us Back Then Anyway"	2022	—	—	—	—	—	—	—	—	Non-album singles
"Panama"	2022	—	—	—	—	—	—	—	—	Non-album singles
"Ain't Talkin' 'bout Love"	2022	—	—	—	—	—	—	—	—	Non-album singles
"Dance the Night Away"	2022	—	—	—	—	—	—	—	—	Non-album singles
"You Really Got Me"	2022	—	—	—	—	—	—	—	—	Non-album singles
"Everybody Wants Some!"	2022	—	—	—	—	—	—	—	—	Non-album singles
"Unchained"	2023	—	—	—	—	—	—	—	—	Non-album singles
"Ain't That Peculiar"	2023	—	—	—	—	—	—	—	—	Non-album singles

=== Video singles ===
Title	Year	Notes
"One Piece Thermo-Molded Country Plastic Chair"	2012	with Scotty Emerick
"The Oo-oka River Blues"	2014	with the Kabuki Orchestra
"Mustang Sally" (originally released as "Happy New Year")	2015	Wilson Pickett cover
"Ain't No Christmas"	2016	

== Other appearances ==
Studio appearances

- Strummin' with the Devil: The Southern Side of Van Halen – vocals on "Jump" and "Jamie's Cryin'" (2006)
- "Ashley" – charity recording, recorded 1999, released 2012

Guest appearance

- Live at Ultra Music Festival Miami 2019 (Highlights) – Appeared onstage with Armin van Buuren during the remix of "Jump" (2019)

== Video albums ==
Title	Details
David Lee Roth: Videos	Released: 1986; Label: Warner Bros.; Formats: VHS, LaserDisc
No Holds Bar-B-Q	Released: 2002; Label: Unknown; Formats: VHS

== with Van Halen ==
=== Studio albums ===
- Van Halen (1978)
- Van Halen II (1979)
- Women and Children First (1980)
- Fair Warning (1981)
- Diver Down (1982)
- 1984 (1984)
- A Different Kind of Truth (2012)
