= The Best (David Lee Roth album) =

Compilation album by David Lee Roth
- Released: October 28, 1997
- Recorded: 1985–1997
- Genre: Hard rock; glam metal
- Length: 78:14
- Label: Warner Bros.; Rhino
- Producer: Various

David Lee Roth chronology
Your Filthy Little Mouth (1994)	The Best (1997)	DLR Band (1998)

Professional ratings
Review scores
Source	Rating
AllMusic	4.5/5 stars
Entertainment Weekly	C−
The Rolling Stone Album Guide	3/5 stars

The Best is a compilation album by American rock vocalist David Lee Roth, compiling his solo work from 1985 to 1996. It also features one song recorded for the album, "Don't Piss Me Off". The album was released in 1997 by Warner Bros. and Rhino Entertainment.

== Track listing ==
No.	Title	Writer(s)	Original album	Length
1.	"Don't Piss Me Off"	Brett Tuggle; Monty Byrom; Steve Hunter; Freebo	New recording	4:28
2.	"Yankee Rose"	Steve Vai; David Lee Roth	Eat 'Em and Smile (1986)	3:53
3.	"A Lil' Ain't Enough"	Roth; Robbie Nevil	A Little Ain't Enough (1991)	4:45
4.	"Just Like Paradise"	Roth; Tuggle	Skyscraper (1988)	4:07
5.	"Big Train"	Roth; Terry Kilgore; Preston Sturges; Joey Hunting	Your Filthy Little Mouth (1994)	4:19
6.	"Big Trouble"	Roth; Vai	Eat 'Em and Smile	4:01
7.	"It's Showtime!"	Roth; Jason Becker	A Little Ain't Enough	3:50
8.	"Hot Dog and a Shake"	Roth; Vai	Skyscraper	3:23
9.	"Skyscraper"	Roth; Vai	Skyscraper	3:43
10.	"Shy Boy"	Billy Sheehan	Eat 'Em and Smile	3:26
11.	"She's My Machine"	Roth; Byrom; David Neuhauser	Your Filthy Little Mouth	3:57
12.	"Stand Up"	Roth; Tuggle	Skyscraper	4:44
13.	"Tobacco Road" (The Nashville Teens cover)	John D. Loudermilk	Eat 'Em and Smile	2:30
14.	"Easy Street" (Edgar Winter Group cover)	Dan Hartman	Crazy from the Heat (1985)	3:51
15.	"California Girls" (The Beach Boys cover)	Brian Wilson; Mike Love	Crazy from the Heat	2:54
16.	"Just a Gigolo / I Ain't Got Nobody" (Louis Prima cover)	Irving Caesar; Leonello Casucci; Roger A. Graham; Spencer Williams; Sam Butera (arrangement)	Crazy from the Heat	4:44
17.	"Sensible Shoes"	Dennis Morgan; Sturges; Roth	A Little Ain't Enough	5:10
18.	"Goin' Crazy!"	Roth; Vai	Eat 'Em and Smile	3:11
19.	"Ladies' Night in Buffalo?"	Roth; Vai	Eat 'Em and Smile	4:02
20.	"Land's Edge"	Roth; Kilgore	Your Filthy Little Mouth	3:14
Total length:				78:14
