= The David Lee Roth Band =

American rock band

- Origin: Pasadena, California, U.S.
- Genres: Pop, rock (Note: The backing band has used numerous genres over the years including: Glam metal, hard rock, synth-pop, pop rock, lounge, and more)
- Years active: 1985–2006, 2015–2022
- Labels: Warner Bros., Reprise Wawazat!! Records, Magna Carter, Friday Music
- Spinoff of: Van Halen, Max Webster
- Past members: David Lee Roth; Eddie Martinez; Sid McGinnis; Willie Weeks; John Robinson; Edgar Winter; Dean Parks; Sammy Figueroa; James Newton Howard; Brian Mann; Carl Wilson; Christopher Cross; Billy Sheehan; Steve Vai; Gregg Bissonette; Jesse Harms; Jason Becker; Steve Hunter; Matt Bissonette; Brett Tuggle; Todd Jensen; Joe Holmes; Terry Kilgore; Rocket Ritchotte; James Hunting; Ron Wikso; John Regan; Richard Hilton; Ray Luzier; John 5; Patrick Howard I; Bart Walsh; James LoMenzo; Brian Young; Toshi Hiketa; Jimmy DeGrasso; Al Estrada; Jake Faun; Danny Wagner; Francis Valentino
- Website: davidleeroth.com

The David Lee Roth Band was Van Halen frontman David Lee Roth's backing band, formed in Pasadena, California. Originally featuring a supergroup lineup of guitarist Steve Vai, bassist Billy Sheehan, and drummer Gregg Bissonette, the band released numerous popular songs and albums from the mid-1980s until the late 1990s. Other well-known musicians in the David Lee Roth Band have included guitarist Jason Becker, guitarist Steve Hunter, guitarist John Lowery, bassist Matt Bissonette, drummer Ray Luzier, and keyboardist Danny Wagner. The backing band's well-known songs include "Yankee Rose", "Goin' Crazy!", "Shy Boy", "Just Like Paradise", "Stand Up", "Damn Good", "A Little Ain't Enough", "She's My Machine", and "Slam Dunk!".

The backing band is not credited as an official band on any of Roth's solo releases outside of 1998's DLR Band.

== History ==
=== Crazy from the Heat ===
Crazy from the Heat is David Lee Roth's first set of music following his departure from Van Halen. This EP is different from prior and future releases in that it featured a lounge music sound. A medley of Just a Gigolo and I Ain't Got Nobody, arranged by Sam Butera and California Girls by The Beach Boys are the two most well known songs on the EP. Roth's cover of California Girls reached number 29 on the Adult Contemporary chart, his sole showing there.

The backing band for this EP included: Dean Parks, Eddie Martinez, Sid McGinnis, Willie Weeks, John Robinson, Sammy Figueroa, James Newton Howard, Edgar Winter, Brian Mann, Carl Wilson, and Christopher Cross

=== Eat 'Em and Smile ===
Eat 'Em and Smile is Roth's debut album following 1985's EP Crazy from the Heat. Released in 1986, the album was a notably straightforward heavy album and was a critical and commercial success, with Rolling Stone, among others, saying nothing on the album was as slick as any of the singles from Van Halen's 5150 album and much more "trashy fun". In a nod to his previous solo effort, there are two lounge songs included, "That's Life" and "I'm Easy." Roth also included a cover of "Tobacco Road". The album's first single, "Yankee Rose", was a staple of both MTV and radio, although "Goin' Crazy!" also saw limited radio play.

A version of "Kids in Action", originally by Kim Mitchell (of Max Webster), was also recorded for this album. However, due to time constraints, the song was not included on the release. Billy Sheehan was briefly a member of Max Webster; according to Kim Mitchell: "He was in the band for about three weeks. He was in a band called Talas out of Buffalo and they would come to Toronto and he'd freak us out, he's just an insane bass player. He loved our music and was a fan of Max Webster, we sort of became friends and when he'd come to town we'd hang out. I said 'Bill, do you want to join the band?' because Mike was leaving the group, and he agreed. So for about three weeks he was in the band and I'll tell you 'High Class in Borrowed Shoes" and 'Battle Scar' never sounded better but 'Diamonds, Diamonds', you couldn't have made it sound any worse. He just didn't know how to lay back and be a real soft, sensitive bass player. It was all about this thing that he had which was absolutely incredible, so it didn't work out. There were no hard feelings and he went on and did really well. I got a call from him one day and he goes 'Hey man I'm in the studio with David Lee Roth, Ted Templeman and Steve Vai and we're covering your tune 'Kids in Action' and we need the words to the second verse'. I was shaking on the phone; this was right after Roth left Van Halen. Then at the last minute it got bumped off the record for "Tobacco Road", they thought they needed a cover. See there's those darn covers again." There is no known studio version of Roth's cover available to the public.

This is the first of two Roth albums to feature the duo of Steve Vai and Billy Sheehan on guitar and bass. Throughout the album, the two would often sync complicated bass lines together with the lead guitar parts, as on tracks such as "Shyboy" and "Elephant Gun". The album brought Steve Vai into the public eye, since his departure from Alcatrazz, as a contender with Edward Van Halen, the previous guitarist who worked with Roth. This album features some of Steve Vai's most prominent guitar work.

=== Skyscraper ===
Roth's second studio album, Skyscraper, spawned the pop-rock song "Just Like Paradise", which reached #6 on the Billboard charts in 1988. Skyscraper was produced by Roth, who said "As you know, I'm a fully-licensed graduate of the Ted Templeman School of High Altitude Production, Engineering & Acrobatic Sound-Engineering." Billy Sheehan plays bass on every track of the album. "Hina", "Perfect timing" and the single, "Just Like Paradise", are more examples of the newly customed DLR sound: all of the outre': musicianship is still here, but the feeling is warmer, when it works, than anything he has so far achieved away from the steadying glow of that Eddie Van man behind him. The vocals on Skyscraper took about 45 hours of studio time. "Damn Good" is the only attempt at a ballad.

Roth himself quotes about the album: "Basically, we've gone for a sound that combines elements of old-style musical things mixed in with some of the new styles that we're interested in. I don't know what happened to the present-day styles, I guess we just skipped them. But all I can say is that it kicks butt! There's a lot of Blues on there, a lot of metal and a whole lot more stuff I cant put a name too... We went for a good live sound and built everything around that..." Roth also states: "It's supposed to be in technicolor. It's supposed to be in layers. You're supposed to have the Big Bang Theory working for you, which is gonna last the 50 or 60 times you listen to it on the 'Walkman'."

=== A Little Ain't Enough ===
A Little Ain't Enough, Roth's third studio album, was released in 1991. It was certified Gold on April 11, 1991. Produced by Bob Rock, the album featured the lead guitar work of Jason Becker, a then up-and-coming guitarist who was diagnosed with amyotrophic lateral sclerosis (ALS, a.k.a. Lou Gehrig's disease) a week after joining the band. He managed to finish recording the album, but was unable to tour in support of the album, as his condition left him with little strength in his hands.

Sales of the album were helped by the controversy surrounding the promotional music video released for the album's first single, "A Li'l Ain't Enough"; featuring barely dressed women and black-faced and oddly dressed little people, the video was banned from MTV shortly after its initial airing.

Although A Little Ain't Enough went out of print on the Warner Bros. label in 1996, it was later reissued (in remastered form) in 2007 on the Friday Music label.

=== Your Filthy Little Mouth ===
Roth released his fourth studio album, Your Filthy Little Mouth, in 1994. It was his last album released on the Warner Bros. label.

Although Your Filthy Little Mouth went out of print on the Warner Bros. label in 1996, it was later reissued (in remastered form) in 2007 on the Friday Music label.

Travis Tritt appears on the song "Cheatin' Heart Cafe".

One studio B-side exists for this release, the blues-oriented "Mississippi Power". It was released on the "She's My Machine" CD single. Additional live tracks were also issued on various singles in the European market, mixing performances of the album material mixed with classic Van Halen cover selections.

All the album artwork, which follows the concept of tattoo art, was created by David Lee Roth.

=== DLR Band ===
DLR Band is Roth's fifth studio album the sole album credited to the David Lee Roth Band as a whole. It was recorded and mixed in ten days, a technique Roth had not utilized since 1979's Van Halen II. John Lowery (a.k.a. John 5) and Mike Hartman played guitar on the record. Hartman actually performed double duty for the record, performing bass guitar under the "B'ourbon Bob" pseudonym.

DLR Band met with favorable reviews upon release, especially in comparison to his previous two solo efforts (1991's A Li'l Ain't Enough and 1994's Your Filthy Little Mouth). However, with little promotion and limited distribution from his own smaller label, the album failed to make a significant mark commercially. Further hurting the album's sales was Roth's inexplicable reluctance to embark on a support tour. In fact, Roth did not hit the road to promote the album until several months into 1999, often in sporadic increments. To add further confusion as to Roth's motives for the album's promotion, little to no material from DLR Band was performed in concert.

Both John Lowery and Mike Hartman failed to join Roth's band for the DLR Band support tour, leaving Roth to find yet another guitarist. The singer chose Bart Walsh, a Los Angeles, CA player who had previously performed as a part of the Van Halen tribute band, The Atomic Punks. The setlists on the DLR Band tour relied heavily on Van Halen material, with some older solo cuts and various covers sprinkled in.

Two tracks from DLR Band, "Indeedido" and "King of the Hill," would later appear on Mike Hartman's solo release, Black Glue, as "Southern Romp" and "Stomp," respectively. Penned by Hartman, both tracks would be remixed and made instrumental for Hartman's release.

=== Diamond Dave ===
Roth's sixth studio album, Diamond Dave, was recorded at Henson Studios in Hollywood, California and released in 2003. It consists mostly of covers of classic rock and blues songs. Two of the tracks—"Bad Habits" and a remake of the 1978 Van Halen song "Ice Cream Man"—had been recorded in 1996 but were not released at that time.

=== Current status ===
Roth rejoined his original band Van Halen on their critically acclaimed 2007 North American reunion tour. Following the tour's success, Dave re-entered the studio with Van Halen and recorded A Different Kind of Truth, the first album of entirely new material released with David Lee Roth as frontman and lead vocalist in 24 years. In 2020, Eddie Van Halen died, and his son Wolfgang Van Halen confirmed the end of Van Halen not long after. In October 2021, Roth announced his intention to retire following a Las Vegas residency from December 2021 to January 2022, however, the shows were canceled and a March 2020 show in Texas, with Kiss being his final show.

== Band members ==
=== Guitar ===
- Eddie Martinez and Sid McGinnis (1984–1985)
- Steve Vai (1985–1989)
- Jason Becker and Steve Hunter (1990–1991)
- Joe Holmes and Steve Hunter (1991–1992)
- Terry Kilgore and Rocket Ritchotte (1993–1994)
- Terry Kilgore (1994)
- Steve Hunter (1997)
- Mike Hartman and John Lowery ("John 5") (1998)
- Bart Walsh (1999, 2001) (died 2019)
- Brian Young (2002–2006)
- Toshi Hiketa (2003–2006)
- Al Estrada (2019–present)

=== Bass ===
- Willie Weeks (1984–1985)
- Billy Sheehan (1985–1988)
- Matt Bissonette (1988–1990)
- Todd Jensen (1990–1991, 1999–2000, 2004–2006)
- James Hunting (1993–1994)
- John Regan (1994)
- Steve Hunter (1997)
- B'urbon Bob (1998)
- James LoMenzo (2001–2004)
- Ryan Wheeler (2019–present)

=== Drums ===
- John Robinson (1984–1985)
- Gregg Bissonette (1985–1992)
- Ron Wikso (1993–1994)
- Ray Luzier (1997–2000, 2001–2005)
- Pat Torpey (1988 on song 'Skyscraper' used live)
- Jimmy DeGrasso (2006)
- Francis Valentino (2020–present)

=== Keyboards ===
- Edgar Winter (1984–1985)
- Jesse Harms (1986)
- Brett Tuggle (1988–1994, 1997)
- Richard Hilton (1994)
- Patrick Howard I (1998–1999)
- Danny Wagner (2019–2020) (Note: Danny Wagner is the keyboardist who performed with Warrant, not the drummer from Greta Van Fleet.)
