= Gregg Bissonette =

American drummer

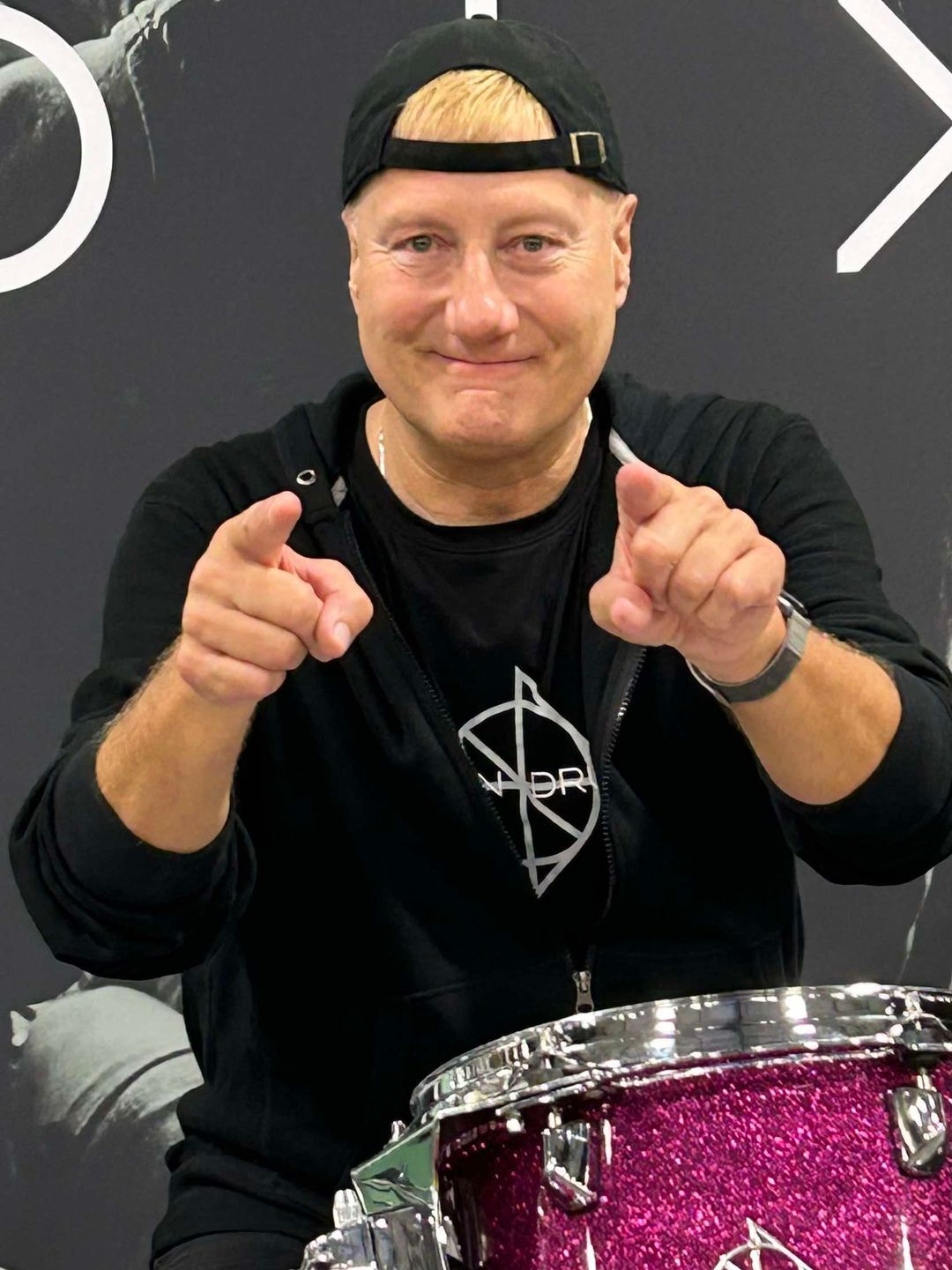
- Bissonette in 2024

Background information
- Born: 9 June 1959 (age 67); Detroit, Michigan, U.S.
- Genres: Jazz rock; hard rock; progressive metal; instrumental rock
- Occupation: Musician
- Instruments: Drums; vocals; trumpet
- Member of: Ringo Starr and his All Starr Band; Bass Extremes; Spinal Tap
- Formerly of: The David Lee Roth Band; Joe Satriani band; Electric Light Orchestra
- Website: greggbissonette.co

Gregg Bissonette (born June 9, 1959) is an American rock drummer and vocalist. He is the brother of bassist Matt Bissonette, with whom he frequently collaborates. Bissonette is known for playing and recording many different styles of music. That experience led to him winning the 2023 Modern Drummer readers poll for best "All Around" drummer and also winning their 2015 category of best "Studio" drummer. He has played on albums by dozens of recording artists, including David Lee Roth's first three solo albums and has toured as part of Ringo Starr & His All-Starr Band since 2008.

== Career ==
One of Bissonette's first recordings was on jazz trumpet legend Maynard Ferguson's Live from San Francisco in 1983. Brother Matt was also in the band and on the recording. He later appeared on Brandon Fields' The Other Side of the Story in 1985. It featured David Garfield on keyboards. A few years later Bissonette would start playing shows with Fields, Garfield and Steve Lukather on guitar and with John Peña on bass as Los Lobotomys. These shows took place at the Baked Potato, a jazz club and restaurant in Los Angeles, California, playing rock, Latin, and jazz.

Bissonette got his big break joining former Van Halen frontman David Lee Roth. The band included guitarist Steve Vai and future Mr. Big bassist Billy Sheehan. During 1985–1992 Gregg appeared on all three US Billboard 200 hit albums Eat 'Em and Smile (no.4) Skyscraper (no.6) and A Little Ain't Enough (no.18) and the subsequent world tours.

In 1990 and 1993, Bissonette released drum videos Private Lesson and Playing, Reading & Soloing with a Band, respectively. Private Lesson covers a variety of topics including double bass drumming, rudiments (with a backsticking technique from the snare drum solo Tornado by Mitch Markovich), playing with a metronome and brushes.

From 1994 to 2004, he played on the musical interludes for every episode for the TV show Friends.

In late 1995, Toto was beginning their Tambu tour when Simon Phillips developed back problems. Phillips asked Bissonette to fill in for him during the tour's first leg.

He played drums on one track on Santana's album Supernatural (1999). In 2007, he recorded on the album La La Land by Daniel Glen Timms.

In 2001 he was set to play on the Electric Light Orchestra's Zoom Tour Live with his brother Matt on Bass. The tour was cancelled after two televised performances: one at the CBS Television City on PBS and one on VH1 Storytellers.

Bissonette started playing double drums with Ringo Starr in 2003 in his band Ringo and The Roundheads. This band also included his brother Matt Bissonette on bass. Gregg has been a member of Ringo Starr and his All Starr Band since. (2008–present)

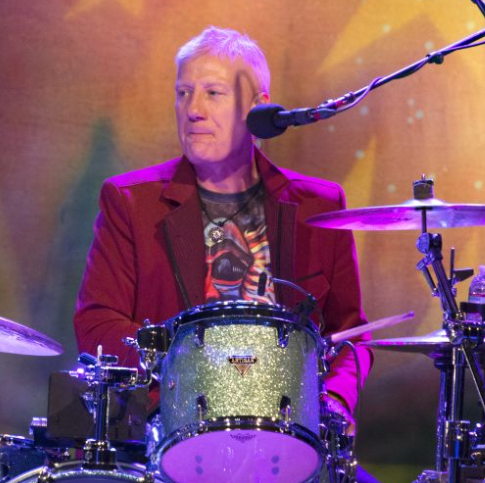
Bissonette in 2018

After appearing on a 2007 album by Spinal Tap's Harry Shearer, Bissonette became the drummer for the parody heavy metal band Spinal Tap for live dates and on their 2009 album Back from the Dead. Credited under his own name on the actual album, when Bissonette appeared with the group live (including at the 2009 Glastonbury Festival), he drummed under the name Scott "Skippy" Scuffleton. In keeping with the band's tradition of their (fictional) drummers dying from bizarre causes, Scuffleton was later said to have sneezed himself to death.

In 2013 Bissonette released his 3rd solo album where he plays drums and sings called Warning Will Robinson. This album also features his brother Matt on bass and backing vocals.

Bissonette played on Steve Lukather's 2021 album, I Found the Sun Again. With eight songs on the album, he played seven songs while Ringo Starr played one.

2021 was the release of The Reddcoats debut album. The album features Gregg and Matt Bissonette on drums and bass with Andy Timmons on guitar, Wally Minko on keyboards and Mike Medina on percussion.

Also in 2021 was the release of the debut album of The Red Locusts, again with Gregg on drums and his brother Matt on bass with Rick Springfield on guitar and vocals.

Bissonette can be heard on a number of rock instrumental and progressive rock albums, including The Extremist by Joe Satriani, Temporal by Shadrane, Deep Forest by Deep Forest, Bass Invader by Martin Motnik, Inner Galactic Fusion Experience by Richie Kotzen, Shadow King by Steve Fister, Revolution Road by Rocket Scientists, In the Eye of Time by Vox Tempus, Bug Alley and the soundtrack to the movie The Endless Summer II by Gary Hoey.

In 2012, Bissonette played drums on several tracks featured on Docker's Guild's album The Mystic Technocracy: Season 1: The Age of Ignorance, the progressive rock space opera masterminded by the French-American musician, teacher, and ethno-musicologist Douglas R. Docker.

In 2024 Gregg and his brother Matt's band The Reddcoats released its second album, Reddcoats 2, which also features Andy Timmons, Ron Pedley, Wally Minko and Mike Medina. The album is 1/2 instrumental and 1/2 with Matt Bissonette on vocals. The album is a mix of pop, funk, fusion and Beatles influenced tunes throughout.

In 2026 he began playing and gigging with Jaminai, a jazz/funk band formed by bass prodigy Ellen Alaverdyan and her father, guitar player Hovak Alaverdyan.

== Discography ==
Artist	Album	Year
Maynard Ferguson	Live from San Francisco	1983
Yarborough and Peoples	Heart Beats	1983
Brandon Fields	The Other Side of the Story	1985
David Lee Roth	Eat 'Em and Smile	1986
Keiko Matsui	A Drop of Water	1987
David Lee Roth	Skyscraper	1988
Pat Kelly	Views of the Future	1989
Frank Gambale	Thunder from Down Under	1990
David Lee Roth	A Little Ain't Enough	1991
Joe Satriani	The Extremist	1992
Steve Bailey	Dichotomy	1992
Tab Benoit	Nice and Warm	1999
L.A. Blues Authority	L.A. Blues Authority	1992
Stan Bush	Every Beat of My Heart	1992
Lanny Cordolla	Of Riffs and Symphonies	1992
Ann Lewis	Rockadelic	1993
Robin Zander	Robin Zander	1993
Joe Satriani	Time Machine	1993
Circus of Power	Magic & Madness	1993
Vasco Rossi	Gli Spari Sopra	1993
Brandon Fields	Brandon Fields	1994
Gary Hoey	The Endless Summer II soundtrack	1994
Milos Dodo Dolezal/Guy Mann-Dude	Milos Dodo Dolezal/Guy Mann-Dude	1994
Joe Satriani	Joe Satriani	1995
Richie Kotzen	Inner Galactic Fusion Experience	1995
Wayne Watson	Field of Souls	1995
Bryan Duncan	Christmas Is Jesus	1995
Jason Becker	Perspective	1995
Andy Summers	Synaesthesia	1995
Mustard Seeds	Mustard seeds	1996
Enrique Iglesias	Enrique Iglesias	1996
Larry Carlton	The Gift	1996
Steve Vai	Fire Garden	1996
Ron Kenoly	Welcome Home	1996
Gary Hoey	Bug Alley	1996
Steve Fister	Shadow King	1997
Steve Lukather	Luke	1997
Pat Boone	In a Metal Mood: No More Mr. Nice Guy	1997
Kalapana	Captain Santa Island Music	1997
Andy Summers	Last Dance of Mr. X	1997
Michael Thompson	The World According to M.T.	1998
Gregg Bissonette	Gregg Bissonette	1998
Paul Anka	A Body of Work	1998
Bette Midler	Bathhouse Betty	1998
Luis Villegas	Cafe Ole	1998
Matt Bissonette	Spot	1998
Bass Extremes	Cookbook	1998
Kombo	Big Blast	1999
Steve Vai	The Ultra Zone	1999
Santana	Super Natural	1999
Carl Verheyen	Slingshot	1999
Matt Bissonette	Spot 2	2000
Duran Duran	Pop Trash	2000
Don Henley	Inside Job	2000
David Benoit	Great Composers of Jazz	2000
Jann Arden	Blood Red Cherry	2000
Gregg Bissonette	Submarine	2000
Crush Velvet Cowboys	Crush Velvet Cowboys	2000
Gordon Goodwin	Swingin for the Fences	2001
Larry Carlton & Steve Lukather	No Substitutions: Live in Osaka	2001
Steve Mindick	So It Begins	2001
Lana Lane	Covers Collection	2002
Jughead	Jughead	2002
Rico Garcia	The Beginning	2002
Lana Lane	Winter Sessions	2003
Eric Norlander	Music Machine	2003
Engelbert Humperdinck	Definition of Love	2003
Under-Radio	Bad Heir Ways	2003
Steve Lukather	Santamental	2003
Dan Ramsey	Gentle Giants	2003
Robert Downey Jr.	The Futurist	2004
Chester E. Smith	Monster Groove Party	2004
Raizing Lazarus	Raising Lazarus	2004
Rocket Richotte	Salute	2004
Vox Tempus	In the Eye of Time	2004
Deep Forest	Deep Forest	2004
Matt Bissonette	Oh No! Bass Solo!	2004
Owen Kortz	Owen Kortz	2004
Ryan Cabrera	Take it all	2004
Richard Marx	My Own Best Enemy	2004
Matt Swindells	Matt Swindells	2004
Matt Swindells	Matt Swindells Here	2005
Ozzy Osbourne	Under Cover	2005
Ten by Tuesday	Tearing Down the Walls	2005
Dan Ramsey	Everybody's Songs But My Own	2005
Martin Motnik	Bass Invader	2005
Brian Setzer	Dig That Crazy Christmas	2005
Steve Vai	Real Illusions: Reflections	2005
Ray Charles	Genius and Friends	2005
Brian Ghiglia	Mystery	2006
Dave C. Norman	Stratosfear	2006
Santo Garofalo	Further Up and Further In	2006
Phil Soussan	Vibrate	2006
Eric Norlander	Hommage Symphoniqe	2006
Michele Pillar	I Hear Angels Calling	2006
Globus	Epicon	2006
Dave Rogers	Blow Your Mind	2006
Lou Rawls	Lou Rawls Christmas	2006
Various Artists	80's Metal Tribute to Van Halen	2006
Rocket Scientists	Revolution Road	2006
Harry Shearer	Songs Pointed and Pointless	2007
Katharine McPhee	Katharine McPhee	2007
Sasha & Shawna	Siren	2007
Mick Abrahams	Rattlesnake Shake Guitar: Music of Peter Green	2007
Code	The Enemy Within	2007
Cal Leonard and His Orchestra	Mr. Irrelevant	2007
Daniel Glen Timms	La La Land	2007
Keith Emerson Band: featuring Marc Bonilla	Keith Emerson Band	2008
Overland	Breakaway	2008
Chris Boardman	Midtown Moves	2008
Mustard Seeds	Mustard Seeds 3	2008
Marco Cardona	Instrumentality	2008
Shadrane	Temporal	2008
Dick Wagner	Full Meltdown	2009
Colin Hay	American Sunshine	2009
Spinal Tap	Back from the Dead	2009
Norm Stockton	Tea in the Typhoon	2009
Jason Sadites	Weve	2009
Randy Jacobs	The Return of Randy Dynamite	2010
Grand Illusion	Brand New world	2010
Ralf Jung	The Art of Pop	2010
The Doobie Brothers	World Gone Crazy	2010
Mark Nilan Jr.	Hands On	2010
Ringo Starr	Live at the Greek Theatre 2008	2010
Jet Velvet	Jet Velvet	2010
Dave C. Norman	Higher Ground	2011
Cindy Horstman and Friends	Fretless	2011
Abby Cubey & Margarita	Devil Dressed in Lace	2011
Barry Manilow	15 Minutes	2011
Globus	Break From This World	2011
Mari Hamada	Legenda	2012
Docker's Guild	The Mystic Techocracy: Season 1: The Age of Ignorance	2012
Gianni De Chellis	Bondage	2013
Gregg Bissonette	Warning Will Robinson	2013
Ringo Starr	Postcards From Paradise	2015
Mari Hamada	Mission	2016
Ringo Starr	Give More Love	2017
Mari Hamada	Gracia	2018
Norm Stockton	Grooves & Sushi	2019
Charly Zurcher	Eleven	2020
Steve Lukather	I Found The Sun Again	2021
The Red Locusts	The Red Locusts	2021
Globus	Cinematica	2022
Bass Extremes	S'Low Down	2022
Mari Hamada	Soar	2023
Marty Friedman	Drama	2024
Matt Bissonette	Common Road	2025
Mr Scary	Haunted	2025
Jason Raso	777	2025
The Locustz	Buzzkill	2026
Matt Bissonette	Straight To The Truth	2026

== Television soundtracks ==
- Mad About You
- King of the Hill
- Just Shoot Me!
- Friends
- Jeopardy!
- Wheel of Fortune

== Movie soundtracks ==
Gregg Bissonette's movie soundtrack credits include the following:

- The Devil Wears Prada
- Bourne Supremacy
- Sex and the City
- Superbad
- Encino Man
- Payback (1999)
- The Endless Summer II
- Waiting for Guffman
- For Your Consideration
- Best in Show
- Hope Floats
- The Craft
- A Mighty Wind
- 2 Days in the Valley
- The Bucket List
- Forgetting Sarah Marshall
- Finding Nemo
- American Pie
- American Pie 2
