= Brett Tuggle =

American musician (1951–2022)

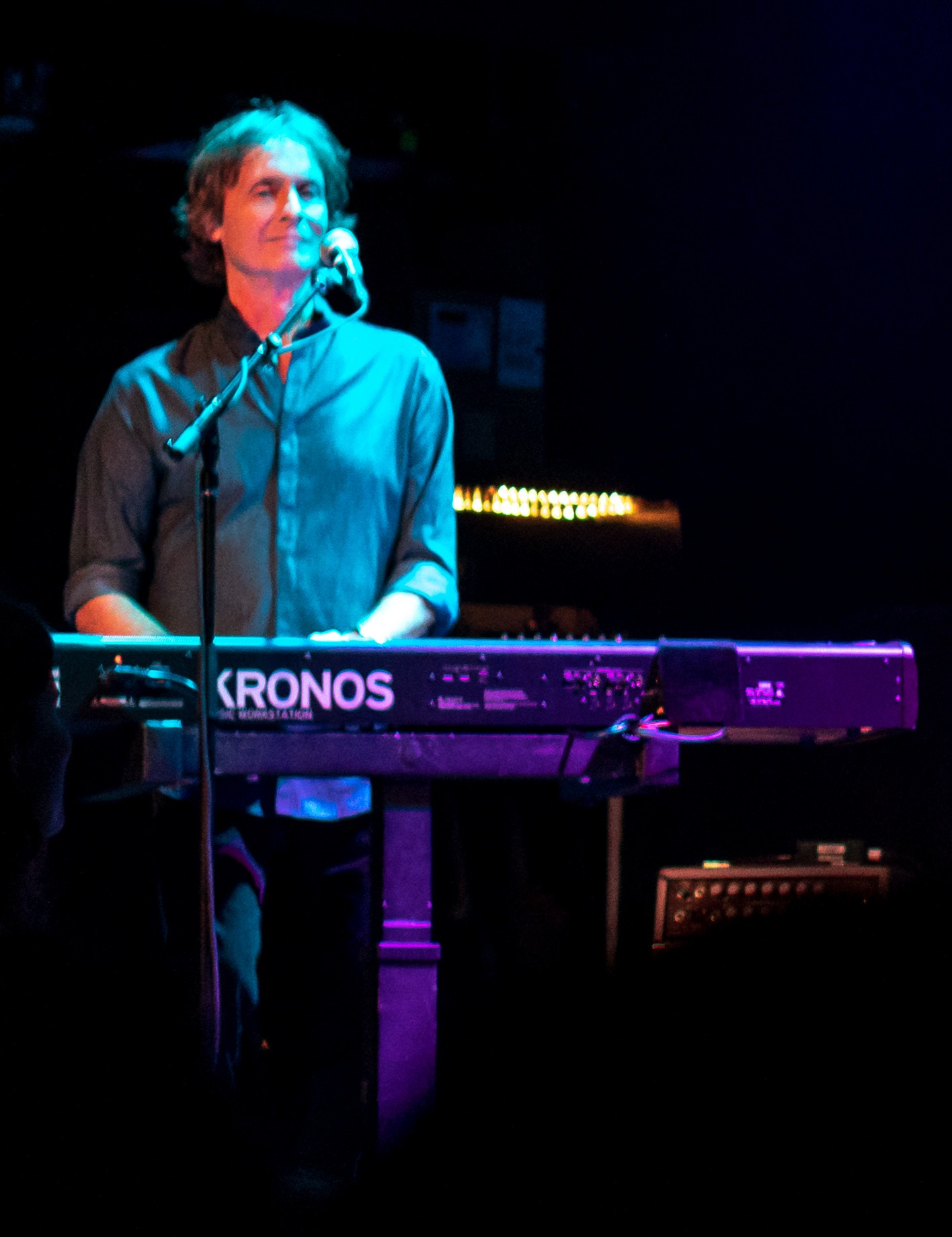
- Tuggle in 2018

Background information
- Born: September 23, 1951; Denver, Colorado, U.S.
- Died: June 19, 2022 (aged 70)
- Genres: Rock; glam metal
- Occupations: Musician; songwriter
- Instruments: Keyboards; guitar; vocals
- Years active: 1979–2022
- Formerly of: Fleetwood Mac

Brett Tuggle (September 23, 1951 – June 19, 2022) was an American musician who is best known for his keyboard playing with Fleetwood Mac and the David Lee Roth band.

== Career ==
=== Early years ===
As a child, he studied classical piano and learned guitar and organ in his birthplace of Denver, Colorado. As a teenager, he played in local Denver bands, including "The Dimensions," "U.S. Male" and "Phaedra." When he left home, he played in touring bands in Texas, where he learned a range of traditional music styles. He then returned to Colorado where he launched the band Head First. In 1979, record producer Keith Olsen invited Tuggle to go to Los Angeles to meet an artist who needed a keyboard player.

=== Performing ===
In Los Angeles, Tuggle made numerous professional contacts with bandleaders, which helped to start his touring career. He was the keyboardist for John Kay & Steppenwolf, before meeting Rick Springfield and joining his band in early 1982. He also played keyboards with David Lee Roth in Roth's post-Van Halen career 1986–1994 and briefly returned in 1997. In 1988, Tuggle co-wrote the top 10 hit single "Just Like Paradise" with Roth. In 1992, Tuggle was invited by Mick Fleetwood to be a member of the band The Zoo. Tuggle also toured with Steve Lukather from Toto. Tuggle played with Chris Isaak and Whitesnake.

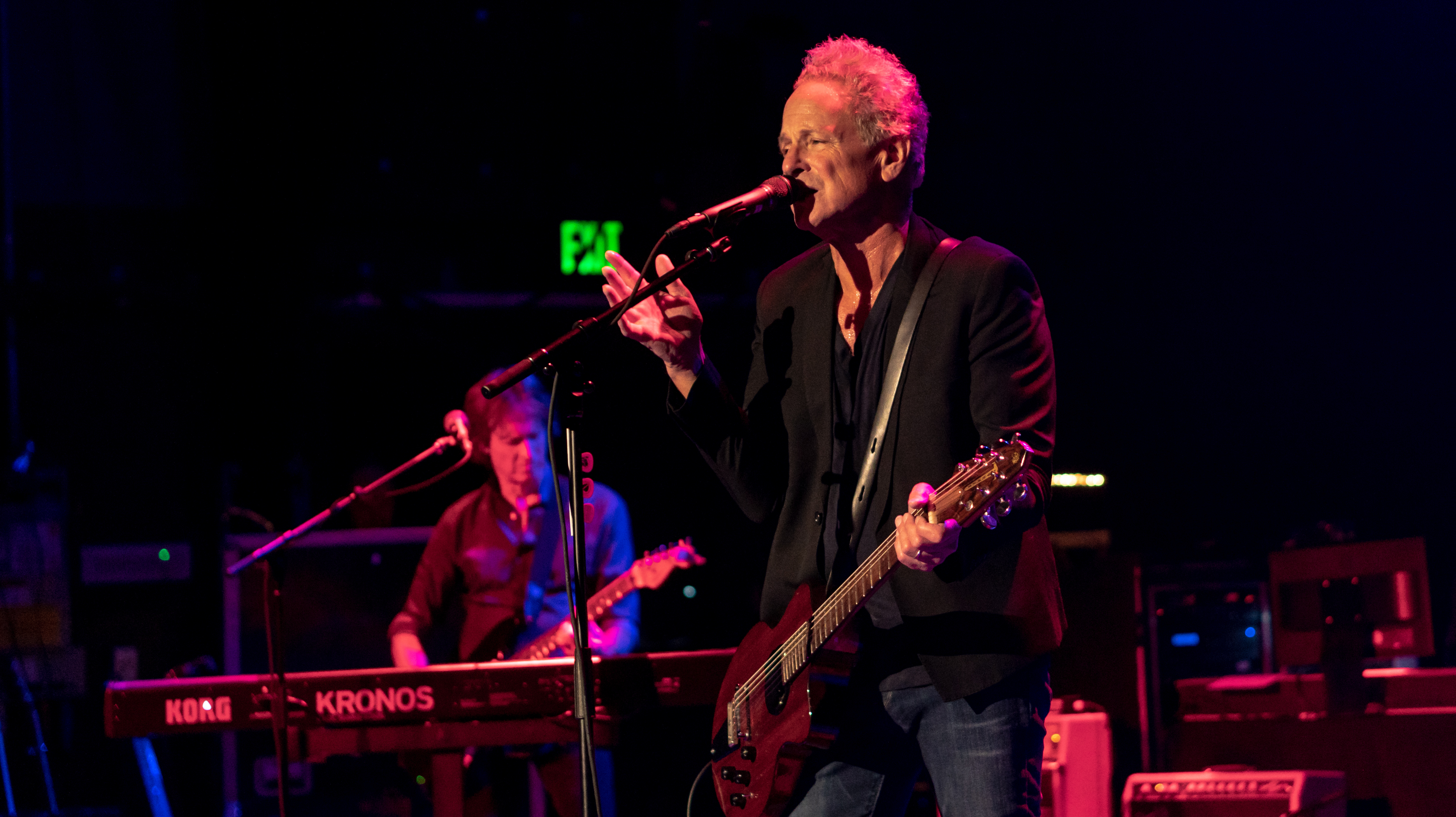
Tuggle (left) with Lindsey Buckingham in 2018

While Tuggle was known for his onstage keyboard playing for Fleetwood Mac, he was best known for his performing and songwriting as keyboard player for Roth on the 1986/1987 Eat 'Em and Smile tour, the 1988 Skyscraper tour, the 1991 A Little Ain't Enough tour where he also has several co-writes on that album, and up to the 1994 Your Filthy Little Mouth tour. He continued to perform on various occasions with Roth until some point in 1996/1997. Tuggle also played keyboards, guitars and sang backing vocals for Fleetwood Mac on their live recording The Dance in May 1997 and the ensuing tour through the fall of 1997.

Scouting magazine's review of Roth's album Skyscraper, praised Tuggle's co-writing work on what it called the "best tunes" on the album. The review calls Tuggle and Roth's co-written song "Just Like Paradise" "...sexy, sassy, and memorable" and states that Tuggle's keyboard playing "...give[s] the music an extra dimension and make[s] "Paradise" the bounciest cut Roth's been involved in since "Jump"." Rick Springfield's book Late, Late at Night states that with his touring band, "Tim on guitar, Mike Siefret on bass, Brett Tuggle on keyboards", Springfield formed a "special camaraderie" with Tuggle on the road due to their shared interest in "illicit sex" with women.

== Death ==
Brett Tuggle died on June 19, 2022, of complications related to cancer. He was 70 years old.
