= Backsticking =

Drum technique

Backsticking is a snare drum technique characterized by swinging the butt of the drumstick to play the drum. There are many different methods. The most common method is executed simply by turning the right wrist upward sharply at a 90-degree angle. Backsticking is typically only practiced among marching drum corps or drumlines, rather than concert or orchestral snare drummers. Notable users of backsticking include Jeff Queen, of the Broadway musical Blast!, and A.R. Carrington.
