= David Lee Roth =

American rock singer (born 1954)

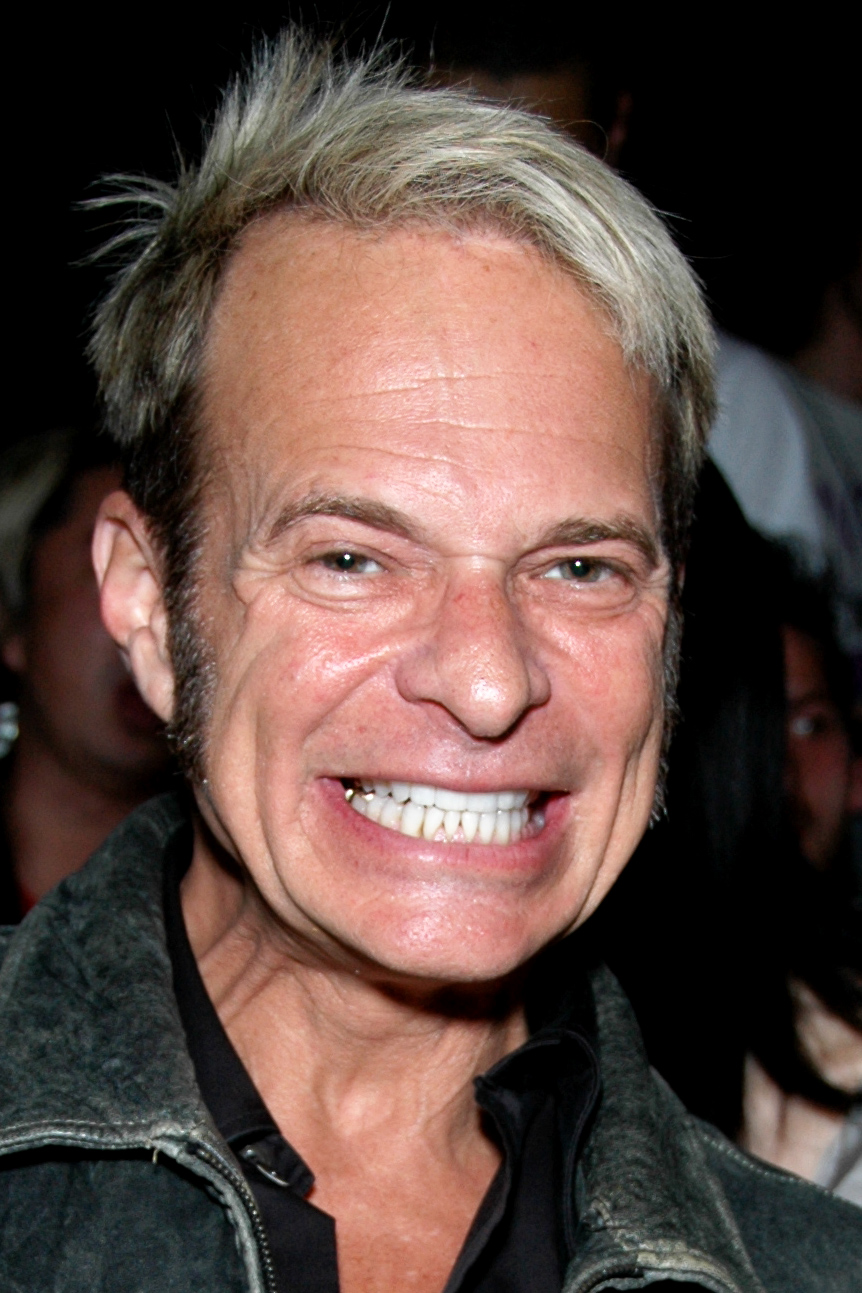
- Roth in 2008

Background information
- Also known as: Diamond Dave
- Born: October 10, 1954 (age 72); Bloomington, Indiana, U.S.
- Genres: Hard rock; heavy metal; glam metal; pop rock
- Occupations: Singer; songwriter
- Works: David Lee Roth discography
- Years active: 1972–present
- Labels: Warner Bros.; Interscope; Magna Carta; CMH
- Formerly of: Van Halen; The David Lee Roth Band
- Website: davidleeroth.com

David Lee Roth (born October 10, 1954) is an American rock singer. Known for his wild and energetic stage persona, he was the lead vocalist of the hard rock band Van Halen for three separate periods: from 1974 to 1985, in 1996, and from 2007 to when they disbanded in 2020. Nicknamed "Diamond Dave", he has had a successful solo career, releasing eight albums, four of which have been RIAA-certified Gold or Platinum. After more than two decades apart, Roth re-joined Van Halen in 2006 for a North American tour that became the highest-grossing in the band's history, and one of the highest-grossing of that year. In 2007, he was inducted into the Rock and Roll Hall of Fame as a member of Van Halen. Roth had solo hits with the songs "California Girls", "Yankee Rose", and "Just Like Paradise" in the late 1980s.

== Early life ==
Roth was born in Bloomington, Indiana to Nathan Hirsh Roth, an ophthalmologist, and Sibyl Roth, a teacher. He has two sisters, one of whom is Lisa Roth, creator of the Rockabye Baby! lullaby music. The family is of Jewish heritage. Roth's uncle Manny Roth was the owner of Cafe Wha? in New York City. All four of Roth's grandparents were immigrants from Russia and his great-grandfather was a Lithuanian cavalryman. From an early age, Roth had an interest in art, especially film and radio; he said his first music idol was Al Jolson.

Roth spent much of his youth in New Castle, Indiana. In a 2019 interview with Q95's "Stuck and Gunner" he explained: "My grandparents moved to New Castle in 1913. It's in the sense of humor, the 'get it done' and how we do get it done approach work ethic of Van Halen, frankly. It's a Midwest approach, not some flakey Hollywood horse manure." The Roths briefly lived in Swampscott, Massachusetts.

In his teens, the family relocated to Pasadena, California. David attended The Webb Schools in Claremont, California, and John Muir High School in Pasadena. Roth's parents arranged for him to receive treatment with a psychiatrist for three years because he was prone to daily bouts of hyperactivity, dubbed "monkey time". Roth attended a horse ranch for troubled teens to build a sense of responsibility. While attending Pasadena City College, he met the Van Halen brothers, Eddie and Alex. During this period, Roth worked as a hospital orderly.

== Career ==
=== First run with Van Halen: 1972–1985 ===
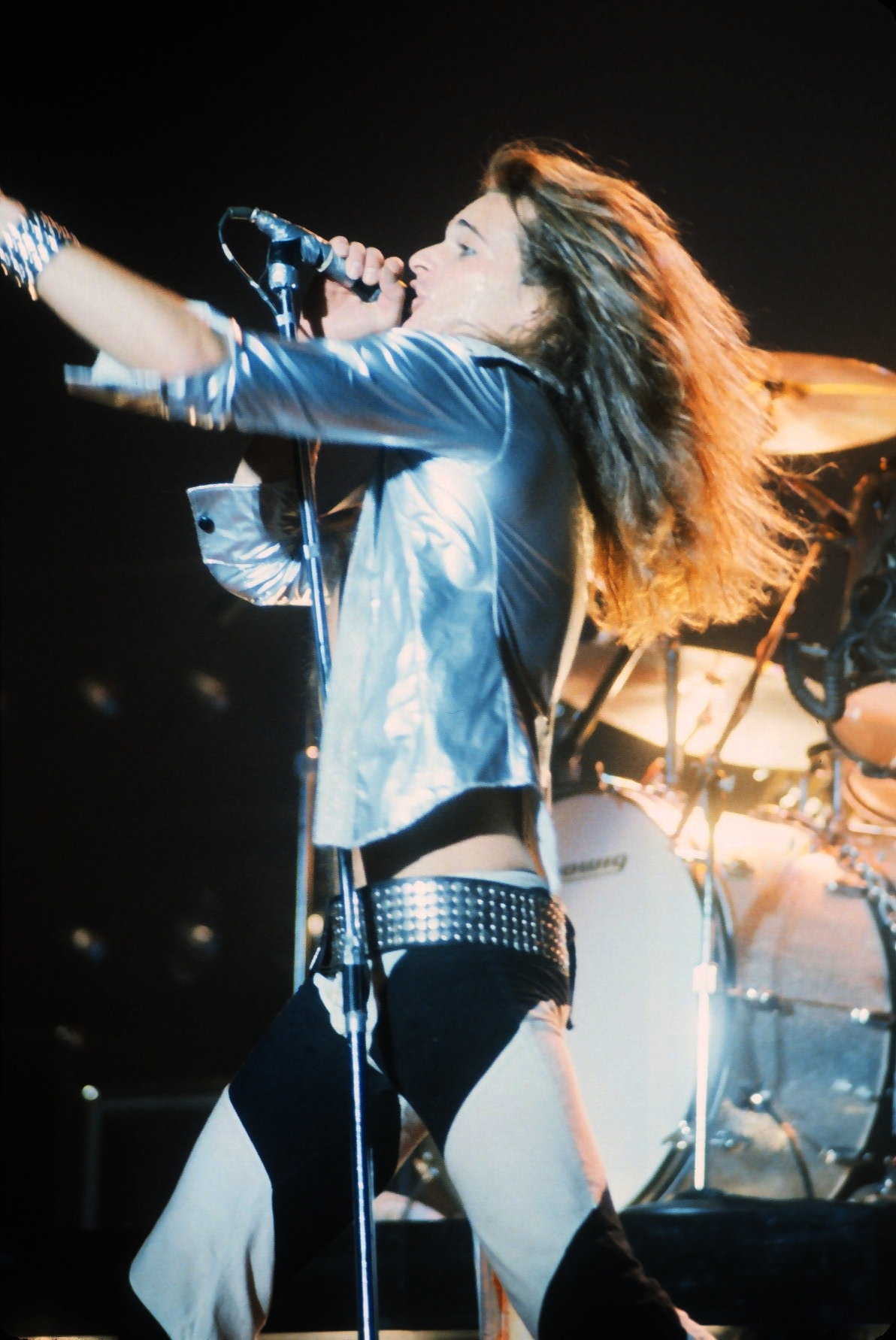
Roth performing in 1978

In his late teens, Roth was singing solo, as well as with an R&B-influenced rock band named the Red Ball Jets, with guitarist Gary "Hurricane" Taylor, drummer Dan Hernandez and brothers Miles and Mark Komora on bass and guitar respectively. Roth says the name was in reference to the red dye used in food at that time, including red candy balls, which would exacerbate his hyperactivity and lead to "monkey hour" at the family home. (Red Ball Jets was also the name of a brand of sneakers popular from 1951 to 1971.) Another Los Angeles band, Mammoth (featuring Alex Van Halen on drums and Eddie Van Halen singing and playing lead guitar), occasionally rented the Red Ball Jets' PA system for $10/night. After a couple of failed auditions, Roth joined Mammoth as lead singer. In 1974, Mammoth officially changed its name to Van Halen. According to Roth, this was his brainchild. He felt it was a moniker that offered long-term identity, aesthetic, and marketing advantages, like Santana.

Performing original and cover songs, Van Halen eventually gained success in the Pasadena, West Hollywood, and Los Angeles areas, becoming a regular feature on Sunset Strip clubs, such as Gazzarri's, Myron's, Whisky a Go Go, and the Starwood Club. In 1976, Gene Simmons took note of the band (in particular Eddie Van Halen, whom Simmons hoped to recruit for his own band, Kiss) and assisted them in producing a 10-track demo tape, featuring songs that would be included on their first two LPs and their 1984 album. The tape, however, did not attract much interest from major record labels. In early 1977, however, during their four-month stint at The Starwood, Warner Bros executive Mo Ostin and producer Ted Templeman signed them to an inauspicious two-album contract, one that heavily favored Warner Bros., offering but a .70 per unit royalty. Manager Noel Monk, then an equal partner in band revenue, renegotiated this rate for double in 1979.

Released in 1978, the debut album Van Halen was recorded at Sunset Sound Recorders and immediately earned the band significant national attention and radio airplay. They toured for three months at the bottom of the bill supporting rising superstars Journey and Montrose (whose lead singer was Sammy Hagar), then another nine months opening for heavy metal icons Black Sabbath. The album reached number 19 on the Billboard 200 and eventually sold more than 12 million copies by 2014, certified Diamond by the RIAA.

Van Halen recorded four more platinum-selling albums over the next five years, often within twelve to fourteen days and immediately returning to the road to tour. Roth is often credited with promoting Van Halen's image, described by David Fricke in Rolling Stone as "a nonstop booze-and-babes party train." Yet despite this 'wildman' image, Roth was key to the band's success not just as a high kicking, tight pantsed, Capezio-wearing singer and lyricist, but as the de facto chairman of the board in band decisions of business, marketing and publicity, according to Monk. Roth's sexy, macho but poetic, often jovial lyrics worked in perfect harmony with the hard rock guitar sounds composed by Eddie Van Halen; a sound-style that helped the band rise near the top of the Billboard chart in 1984, with their album 1984. Looking back at Roth's tenure, Fricke dubbed Van Halen as "the monster rock action squad that ruled the charts and the airwaves for seven years."

Despite the band's seven-year financial and artistic success, a creative rift developed between Roth and Eddie Van Halen early on. Roth was interested in popularity via original or even cover songs about partying, dancing, women and sex, along the lines of Aerosmith, AC/DC or even disco, while Eddie wanted darker, deeper tunes in minor keys, like those on their 4th LP Fair Warning. They had been artistic foils on the first three albums, but their fifth LP, Diver Down, saw a disgruntled Edward "sacrificing" his original synthesizer and guitar riffs to five cover songs, three of which became singles: "Dancing in the Street", "Where Have All the Good Times Gone" and "(Oh) Pretty Woman". In 1983, Eddie designed and constructed a recording studio in his home with the band's recording engineer, Donn Landee. This led to creative conflict, as it allowed the guitarist to be in control of the recording process. Furthermore, he began to experiment with keyboards and synthesizers, while Roth preferred guitar-heavy hard rock. Their sixth and final album together until 2012, 1984, was a critical and commercial success and continued the band's move toward mainstream pop music. It reached No. 2 on the charts.

In early 1985, while still a member of Van Halen, Roth released Crazy from the Heat, an eclectic solo EP of off-beat pop standards. It featured a cover of "California Girls" which, like the original Beach Boys version, peaked at number 3 on the Billboard Hot 100.

According to Van Halen manager Noel Monk, Roth formally parted ways with his Van Halen bandmates in August 1985 (although an urban legend persists that it was April 1, April Fool's Day), taking with him 60 Van Halen employees, including VH Head of Security, Ed Andersen. In his 1997 autobiography, Crazy from the Heat, a bitter Roth characterized Van Halen's music just before his 1985 departure as "morose".

=== Solo career and commercial success: 1985–1991 ===
In 1984, Roth wished to record a solo EP quickly and shoot a film. "We've created a whole retinue of characters," he noted of his vision with Angelus. "It's a genuine film. It's not 'Dave Singing' or 'Elvis'." Entitled Crazy from the Heat, the EP was released in January 1985, while the film was budgeted at $20 million by CBS Films; however, the project folded after the consolidation of CBS Studios.

In late 1985, now separated from Van Halen, Roth assembled a virtuoso supergroup, consisting of guitarist Steve Vai (previously of Frank Zappa's band), bassist Billy Sheehan (previously of Talas), and drummer Gregg Bissonette (previously of Maynard Ferguson's big band). With veteran Van Halen producer Ted Templeman producing, Roth released his debut solo LP, Eat 'Em and Smile in July 1986. The album saw Roth's return to hard rock music, but incorporated some of his eclectic musical tastes, including a jazz cover of Frank Sinatra's "That's Life" and the bluesy, 1960s hit "Tobacco Road". Eat 'Em and Smile met with widespread commercial and critical success, charting at No. 4 on the Billboard Top 200, selling over two million copies in the U.S. alone. Roth and his band toured arenas extensively in support of Eat 'Em and Smile before returning to the studio in 1987 to record a follow-up album.

In January 1988, Roth released Skyscraper, a more experimental LP featuring the hit single "Just Like Paradise". Co-produced by Roth and Steve Vai under the working title "Cliffhanger", Skyscraper peaked at No. 6 on the Billboard album chart and ultimately sold two million copies in the US. Soon after Skyscraper's release, Sheehan left Roth's band due to musical differences. He was replaced in time for the album's support tour with bassist Matt Bissonette (drummer Gregg Bissonette's brother). The international Skyscraper Tour arena was a major production featuring, at different points during each concert, Roth surfing above the audience on a surfboard suspended from an arena's rafters, and lowered into the center of each arena in a descending boxing ring. Both parts of the stage show were featured in the "Just Like Paradise" music video. The show featured the band in a calypso segment playing Caribbean steel drums and in an unplugged segment where the band performed acoustic covers of old rock and roll songs. Following the tour for Skyscraper, Vai left Roth's band to pursue a solo career and record and tour with Whitesnake.

Roth hired 19-year-old guitar virtuoso Jason Becker to replace Vai prior to recording his third solo LP, A Little Ain't Enough in 1991. A hard rock album produced by Bob Rock, A Little Ain't Enough achieved RIAA gold status shortly after its January 1991 release. Before starting a support tour for A Little Ain't Enough, Becker was diagnosed with Lou Gehrig's disease, rendering him unable to perform onstage. Guitarist Joe Holmes stood in for Becker during the tour. Later in 1991, Nirvana and grunge rock emerged, altering popular tastes and suddenly making Roth's brand of hard rock seem unfashionable. Roth's band fractured shortly following the tour's completion.

=== Commercial decline and reunions with Van Halen: 1992–2003 ===
In April 1993, Roth was arrested in New York City's Washington Square Park for buying what he described as "$10 worth of Jamaican bunk reefer" from an undercover police officer. The arrest made headlines and became a late-night television punch-line. When asked by Howard Stern whether the bust was a publicity stunt, Roth said, "Howard, in New York City this small of a bust is a $35 traffic citation. It literally says 'Buick, Chevy, Other'. Your dog poops on the sidewalk, it's $50. If I was looking for publicity, I would have pooped on the sidewalk."

In March 1994, Roth released Your Filthy Little Mouth, a musically eclectic album produced by Nile Rodgers. The album failed to achieve significant critical or commercial success, proving to be Roth's first solo effort not to achieve RIAA Gold or Platinum status shortly after its release. Roth played smaller venues in the U.S., and larger venues in Europe on a support tour.

In 1995, Roth returned with an adult lounge act, performing largely in Las Vegas casinos, with a brass band that included Nile Rodgers, Edgar Winter, and members of the Miami Sound Machine. There were several exotic dancers. In 1997, Roth wrote a memoir, Crazy from the Heat. The 359-page book was a selected collection of 1,200 pages of monologues, which were recorded and transcribed by a Princeton University graduate who followed Roth for almost a year. Henry Rollins is said to have worked on the memoir.

In June 1996, Roth briefly reunited with Van Halen, to great public fanfare. He recorded two new songs for Van Halen's Best Of – Volume I, "Can't Get This Stuff No More" and "Me Wise Magic". After an infamous appearance on September 5, 1996, at the MTV Video Music Awards during which Roth and Eddie Van Halen reportedly threatened each other, Roth was passed over for Van Halen's vocalist job in favor of Gary Cherone. In 2012, Cherone confirmed the longtime rumor that he had already been chosen long before the MTV incident, suggesting that Van Halen used Roth to create public interest in the hits collection. "Me Wise Magic", Van Halen's display of psychedelia-influenced rock with Roth on vocals, became a No. 1 Billboard Mainstream Rock hit in 1996.

In 1998, Roth released DLR Band, another album of original material. The album featured a popular song, "Slam Dunk", which, like a majority of the album, was co-written by rising guitarist and longtime Roth fan, John 5. In 1999, Roth contacted the Songs of Love Foundation asking if he would be able to sing a song for an ailing child. He went on to record a "Song of Love" for 9-year-old Ashley Abernathy who was battling leukemia, which was released publicly many years later.

In 2001, rumors circulated that Roth and the members of Van Halen had recorded several new songs together and were attempting another reunion. Roth and bassist Michael Anthony later confirmed that information, but nothing came of the music. The demos recorded at the sessions would be reworked in 2012's A Different Kind of Truth, but with Wolfgang Van Halen replacing Anthony. A rumored box set did not materialize. Instead, Warner Bros. issued remastered versions of all six early Van Halen studio albums.

In 2002, the "Song for Song: The Heavyweight Champions of Rock and Roll Tour" paired Roth with his 'nemesis' Sammy Hagar, and it proceeded to revive the career of Roth. Despite the monetary success and publicity generated by the tour, Roth's future with Van Halen seemed uncertain. "Yankee Rose" appeared in the 2002 videogame Grand Theft Auto: Vice City, playing on rock station V-Rock, while generally, Roth became more visible than he had been in years, such as appearing on commercials for MTV with Justin Timberlake. In 2003, Roth released an album called Diamond Dave, which included one original John 5 collaboration among numerous cover songs.

=== Other ventures: 2004–2006 ===
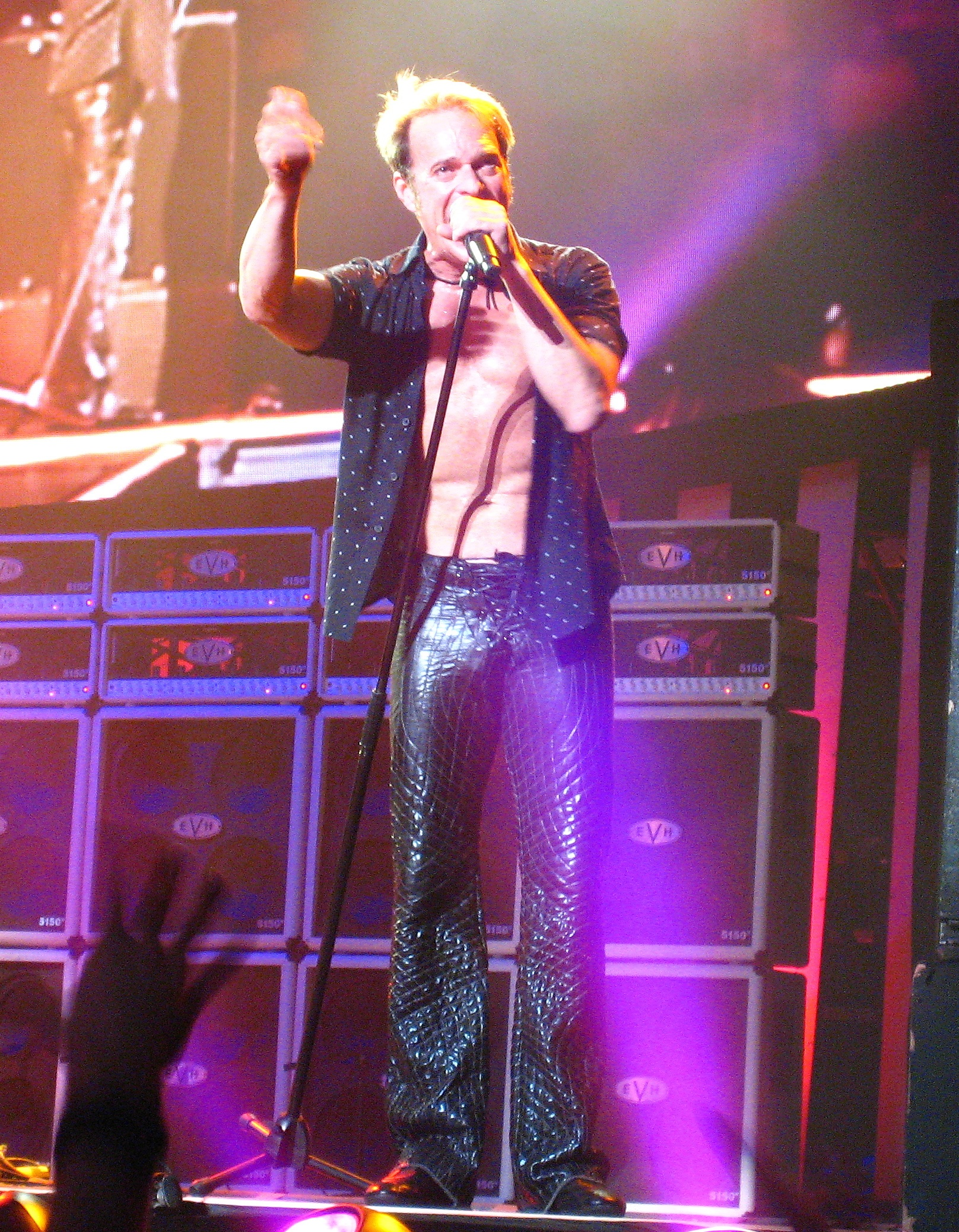
Roth in 2007

In 2004, Roth appeared on the TV series The Sopranos as a poker-playing guest of Tony Soprano. Regarding this, Roth was quoted on his website as saying, "Mom says I'm going to look like Lee Marvin in 10 years whether I'm in movies or not, so I might as well get after it!" On July 4, 2004, Roth performed with the Boston Pops Orchestra at Boston's annual Pops Goes the Fourth celebration. The performance was witnessed by over 100,000 people live in Boston, and by millions more on American television. In 2006, Roth covered two Van Halen songs for an album titled Strummin' with the Devil, a tribute to his old band in bluegrass style. The album topped out at 66 on the U.S. Billboard country charts.

Roth became a certified Emergency Medical Technician (EMT) in New York in 2004. He trained as an EMT and worked night shifts in the Bronx, Manhattan, and Brooklyn, completing over 200 ambulance rides. Roth was motivated by a family history in medicine (his father was a surgeon) and a desire to perform community service rather than pursue a new primary career. He also received additional training as a military EMT at Fort Sam Houston in Texas to learn patient transport for helicopters. Roth's EMT training was largely handled by Linda Reissman, who detailed this on an episode of The DLR Cast podcast.

In 2006, Roth was tapped to replace his friend Howard Stern on terrestrial radio, following Stern's departure from terrestrial to Sirius Satellite Radio. Roth's show lasted for four months and ended in a lawsuit. During the course of the show, Roth maintained a relationship with Howard 100 News reporter Steve Langford. Roth and Langford met frequently after shows, with Langford bringing tape back to Stern of Roth's complaints towards WXRK's management. Issues included Roth's firing, the missing podcast, and his show being cut off early. On Roth's final day, April 21, 2006, he performed the Rolling Stones song "You Can't Always Get What You Want" for Stern and discussed an impending lawsuit against CBS.

Later, on October 14, 2012, Roth began broadcasting a video webcast/podcast on his YouTube channel, Spotify and iTunes.

=== Return to Van Halen: 2007–2015 ===
On January 24, 2007, Billboard.com reported that Roth would rejoin Van Halen for a 40-date arena and amphitheater tour in mid-2007. This report, among many others, was confirmed with an official press release posted on the official Van Halen website on February 2, 2007.

On February 2, 2007, the official Van Halen website released information that Roth had rejoined the band along with current members Alex, Eddie, and Eddie's teenage son, Wolfgang Van Halen. On March 8 the official Van Halen website posted a letter from Eddie Van Halen stating that he did not feel he could perform his absolute best, and the tour with Roth would be postponed.

In March 2007, five members of Van Halen (the four original members and Sammy Hagar) were inducted into the Rock and Roll Hall of Fame. The Van Halen brothers did not attend due to Eddie's condition. Roth was to perform with the band Velvet Revolver; however, conflict with the band caused his part to be canceled. Roth subsequently did not attend the induction, leaving only Michael Anthony and Sammy Hagar to represent Van Halen. Both Anthony and Hagar thanked Roth publicly for his contribution to the band during the awards acceptance. The conflict was rumored to be based on song selection. Roth wanted to perform "Jump", the band's highest-charting song, but Velvet Revolver would only agree to play "Ain't Talkin' 'Bout Love" or "You Really Got Me". When it was finally agreed upon that Paul Shaffer would perform "Jump", Roth claimed there was no longer enough time to rehearse and opted not to attend the ceremony.

On August 13, 2007, six months after the initial reunion tour was postponed, it was confirmed by Van Halen with Roth at a press conference in Los Angeles that they would start the tour again in September 2007. At that conference, Eddie Van Halen stated that he and Roth were "like brothers" now. Calling Van Halen a "real band", both Van Halen and Roth spoke of the possibility of further worldwide touring and a new album in mind for the future.

On June 5, 2008, Van Halen announced that the 2007–2008 tour with Roth grossed more than $93 million, a record for the rock band. Van Halen played to nearly one million people during 74 arena shows throughout the United States and Canada, beginning September 27, 2007, in Charlotte, North Carolina, and wrapping June 3, 2008, in Quebec City, QC, for the 400th anniversary of the city.

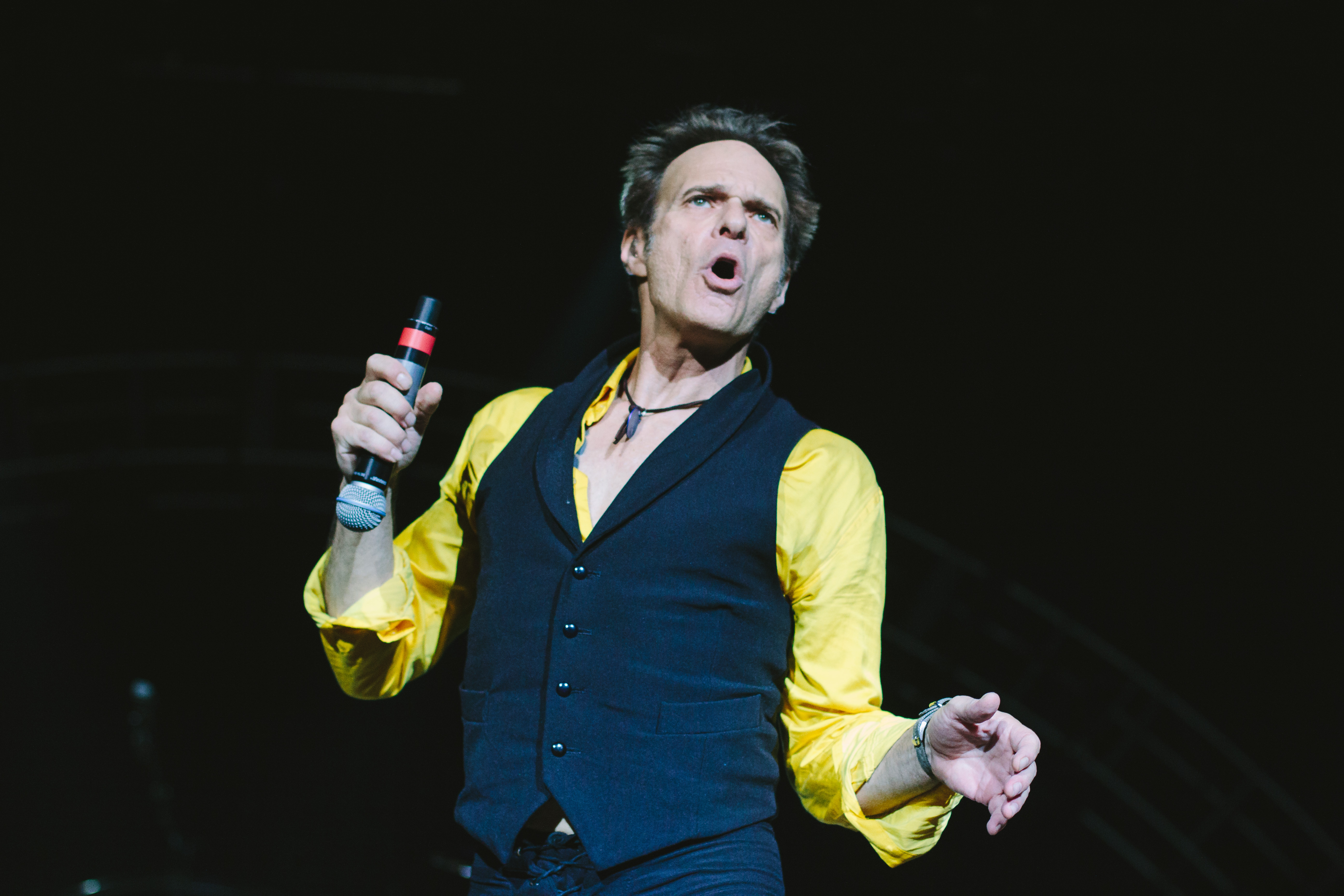
Roth performing with Van Halen in 2014

In December 2011, Van Halen announced a 2012 tour with Roth. The new Roth-fronted Van Halen album A Different Kind of Truth was released on February 7, 2012, and a tour commenced that month.

In March 2015, a new live album was released, Tokyo Dome Live in Concert, recorded in June 2013 during the A Different Kind of Truth Tour. That same month, the band made its first foray into American television by appearing on Jimmy Kimmel Live!, announcing a new tour in the process.

Van Halen disbanded after Eddie's death from cancer on October 6, 2020.

=== Current projects: 2016–present ===
In 2014, Roth had recorded sessions with John 5 on guitar. Roth claimed in October 2019 the album would soon be released. As of 2025, the record had yet been released, though several singles were released online.

In October 2020, Roth paid tribute to his late bandmate Eddie Van Halen by sharing his track "Somewhere Over the Rainbow Bar and Grill," from the 2014 sessions. It was the first of five singles from the sessions released between late 2020 and early 2022.

Roth went on an American tour with Kiss in early-2020, having been tapped as the opening act for the band in 43 cities. Nearly halfway into the scheduled dates, the tour was postponed due to the COVID-19 global pandemic.

In October 2021, Roth announced his intentions to retire from performing following a final residency set at the House of Blues Las Vegas at Mandalay Bay in Las Vegas; the residency was to take place December 2021 through January 2022, for a total of nine dates. The shows were eventually cancelled, with Roth's last performance up to that point being a March 2020 concert in Texas with Kiss.

Following his supposed retirement from performing, and the release of five singles of original material, Roth proceeded to release a series of covers of Van Halen songs throughout the second half of 2022.

Roth performed his first public concert in five years at the M3 Rock Festival in Columbia, Maryland, on May 3, 2025, playing a set of all Van Halen classics and deep cuts. He subsequently announced a US tour for the summer of 2025, The Roth Tour.

On April 10, 2026, Roth guested during Teddy Swims set at Coachella in April 2026, singing "Jump" together with Swims. On April 16, 2026, Roth kicked off his Don't Love Me, Rent Me world tour.

== Personal life ==
Roth has never married. He dated actress Apollonia Kotero in the 1980s. In 1984 he appeared in public with actress Sonia Braga including at the first MTV Video Music Awards. In a 2013 interview, he said he had four great loves in his life, but would not name them out of respect for their privacy. He said during the twenty years of Van Halen, he "slept with every pretty girl with two legs."

In 2018, Roth and tattoo artist Ami James created INK the Original, which was a line of skincare products designed to protect tattooed skin. Roth spent more than 300 hours getting tattooed in Japan between 2013 and 2014, and noticed the body art market was expanding. After investing more than $7 million in the company, and countless hours, the business closed in March 2022 for reasons not stated.

Roth maintains residences in Los Angeles, New York City and Tokyo. In 2004, he trained as a state-licensed emergency medical technician in New York. In 2012 he said, "I probably have over 200 9-1-1 calls on my ticket in the last six years alone. I live a very different life away from music." He is a martial artist, has been training in kenjutsu since he was twelve years old, and also practices kenpō and Brazilian jiu-jitsu. Since 2006, Roth is a licensed private pilot for rotorcraft-helicopter.

Roth is a visual artist working in painting and drawings with a theme of social commentary. Roth is a "relatively experienced" climber who climbed Half Dome in Yosemite National Park for the Skyscraper album cover and "Just Like Paradise" video. His Crazy From the Heat book tells that he also climbed the Himalayas, not quite reaching the summit of Mount Everest.

== Solo band members ==
- Guitar Steve Vai (1986–1989)
- Bass guitar Billy Sheehan (1986–1988)
- Percussion Gregg Bissonette (1986–1992)

=== Guitar ===
- Al Estrada - lead guitar (2019–present)
- Jake Faun - rhythm guitar (2020)
- Frankie Lindia - rhythm guitar (2020)
- Brian Young - lead guitar (2002–2006)
- Toshi Hiketa - rhythm guitar (2003–2006)
- Bart Walsh (1999–2001) (died 2019)
- Mike Hartman (1998) (died 2000)
- John 5 (1998, 2012, 2019)
- Steve Hunter (1990–1992, 1997)
- Terry Kilgore (1993–1994)
- Rocket Ritchotte (1993–1994)
- Joe Holmes (1991–1992)
- Desi Rexx (1991, a few shows in Europe only)
- Jason Becker (1990–1991)
- Steve Vai (1985–1989)

=== Bass guitar ===
- Ryan Wheeler (2020–2026)
- Todd Jensen (1990–1991, 1999–2000, 2004–2006)
- James LoMenzo (2001–2004)
- B'urbon Bob (1998)—pseudonym for John 5
- John Regan (1994)
- James Hunting (1993–1994)
- Matt Bissonette (1988–1990)
- Billy Sheehan (1985–1988)

=== Drums ===
- Francis Valentino (2020–present)
- Mike Musselman (2019–2020)
- Jimmy DeGrasso (2006)
- Ray Luzier (1997–2000, 2001–2005)
- Ron Wikso (1993–1994)
- Larry Aberman (1994)
- Joseph Hudson (1993–1994, 1995–1997)
- Gregg Bissonette (1985–1992)

=== Keyboard ===
- Danny Wagner (2020–2025) (Note: Danny Wagner is the keyboardist who performed with Warrant, not the drummer from Greta Van Fleet.)
- Marcus Margand II (2000–2001)
- Patrick Howard I (1998–1999)
- Billy Thompson (1996–1998)
- Richard Hilton (1994–1995)
- Brett Tuggle (1988–1994, 1997) (died 2022)
- Jesse Harms (1986)

== Discography ==
=== Studio albums ===
- Eat 'Em and Smile (1986)
- Skyscraper (1988)
- A Little Ain't Enough (1991)
- Your Filthy Little Mouth (1994)
- DLR Band (1998)
- Diamond Dave (2003)

=== Extended plays ===
- Crazy from the Heat (1985)

=== with Van Halen ===
- Van Halen (1978)
- Van Halen II (1979)
- Women and Children First (1980)
- Fair Warning (1981)
- Diver Down (1982)
- 1984 (1984)
- A Different Kind of Truth (2012)

== Books ==
- Roth, David Lee (1997). Crazy from the Heat. Hyperion. ISBN 0-7868-8947-0.
