= DLR Band =

Studio album by The David Lee Roth Band
- Released: June 9, 1998
- Studios: Ocean Studios (Burbank, California); Mama Jo's Studios and Royaltone Studios (North Hollywood, California)
- Genre: Hard rock
- Length: 51:19
- Label: Wawazat!!
- Producer: Bob Marlette

The David Lee Roth Band chronology
Your Filthy Little Mouth (1994)	DLR Band (1998)	Diamond Dave (2003)

Professional ratings
Review scores
Source	Rating
AllMusic	3/5 stars
The Daily Vault	B
The Rolling Stone Album Guide	1/5 stars

DLR Band is the fifth full-length studio album by David Lee Roth, the former vocalist of Van Halen, and the first and only credited to the DLR Band. It was released in 1998 and remains the only installment on Roth's own Wawazat!! label.

== Information ==
DLR Band was recorded and mixed in ten days, a technique Roth had not utilized since 1979's Van Halen II. John Lowery (aka John 5), Mike Hartman, and Terry Kilgore played guitar on the record. Lowery actually performed double duty for the record, performing bass guitar under the "B'ourbon Bob" pseudonym. Also on the album was a then virtually unknown drummer Ray Luzier, later a full member of Korn.

Two tracks from DLR Band, "King of the Hill" and "Indeedido", would later appear on Mike Hartman's solo release, Black Glue, as "Southern Romp" and "Stomp", respectively. Written by Hartman, both tracks would be remixed and made instrumental for Hartman's release.

The album's cover artwork features a picture of model Bettie Page taken by Bunny Yeager, who receives credit in the liner notes. This led to it being colloquially referred to as the Bettie Page album.

DLR Band debuted at #172 on the charts with 8,000 copies sold in the first week. Within a year the album had sold 65,000 copies.

== Track listing ==
No.	Title	Writer(s)	Length
1.	"Slam Dunk!"	David Lee Roth; John Lowery; Bob Marlette	2:37
2.	"Blacklight"	Roth; Lowery; Marlette	3:41
3.	"Counter-Blast"	Roth; Lowery; Marlette	3:14
4.	"Lose the Dress (Keep the Shoes)"	Roth; Terry Kilgore	3:13
5.	"Little Texas"	Roth; Lowery; Marlette	3:20
6.	"King of the Hill"	Roth; Mike Hartman	3:52
7.	"Going Places..."	Roth; Kilgore	5:19
8.	"Wa Wa Zat!!"	Roth; Lowery; Marlette	2:54
9.	"Relentless"	Roth; Lowery; Marlette	3:30
10.	"Indeedido"	Roth; Hartman	3:11
11.	"Right Tool for the Job"	Roth; Kilgore	3:24
12.	"Tight"	Roth; Kilgore	4:08
13.	"Weekend with the Babysitter"	Roth; Lowery; Marlette	3:36
14.	"Black Sand"	Roth; Kilgore	5:20
Total length:			51:19

== Personnel ==
- David Lee Roth – vocals, harmonica (2)
- John Lowery – guitars (1–3, 5, 8, 9, 13), bass (4, 7)
- Terry Kilgore – guitars (4, 7, 11, 12, 14), synthesizers (14)
- Mike Hartman – guitars (6, 10)
- Bob Marlette – bass (1–3, 5, 6, 8–10, 13)
- Tom Lilly – bass (11, 14)
- Ray Luzier – drums

=== Production ===
- Bob Marlette – producer
- Erwin Musper – engineer, mixing, mastering
- Erich Gobel – assistant engineer
- Jeff Thomas – assistant engineer
- Kieren McClelland – mastering
- Wawazat!! Masterlab (Tahiti) – mastering location
- David Lee Roth – cover art concept
- Kendall Johnson – art direction, design
- Michael Migliozzi – art direction, design
- Bunny Yeager – photography
- Steve Martin – personal assistant
- Eddie Anderson – representative management
- Lisa Luke – administrative management
