= Your Filthy Little Mouth =

Studio album by David Lee Roth
- Released: March 8, 1994
- Recorded: 1993
- Studio: The Hit Factory (New York City)
- Genre: Rock
- Length: 55:55
- Label: Reprise
- Producer: Nile Rodgers

David Lee Roth chronology
| A Little Ain't Enough (1991) | Your Filthy Little Mouth (1994) | DLR Band (1998) |

Professional ratings
Review scores
| Source | Rating |
|---|---|
| AllMusic | 2/5 stars |
| Chicago Tribune | 1.5/4 stars |
| Entertainment Weekly | B+ |
| Rolling Stone | 2/5 stars |

Your Filthy Little Mouth is the fourth full-length studio LP by David Lee Roth, then the former lead singer of the American rock band Van Halen. The album was released in 1994 by Reprise Records, was produced by Nile Rodgers and featured a more eclectic sound than Roth's typical albums.

== Overview ==
Released near Roth's critical and commercial nadir, Your Filthy Little Mouth did not conform to the expectations of rock music during 1994 and entirely ignored the prevailing trend for grunge rock, and also bucked public perception of Roth. The album features stripped-down arrangements that touched on diverse styles of music including jazz fusion, dance, country, reggae, R&B, big band, rock, and blues. However, the commercial specialization of TV and radio formats during the early 1990s left such diverse albums with few options for airplay.

The B-side to "She's My Machine", an atmospheric blues song titled "Mississippi Power", is available on the Japanese release.

== Reception ==
At the time of its release in 1994, Your Filthy Little Mouth received mixed reviews from music critics, and with particularly negative responses coming from heavy metal critics. While Roth's newly intricate lyrics were well-received, the wide range of genre exercises on Your Filthy Little Mouth earned Roth commensurate praise and derision. Deborah Frost of Entertainment Weekly graded the album a "B+", noting that "thanks to Nile Rodgers' skillful production, the result is Roth's most listenable, insightful, and hysterical effort in years." Randy Krbechek of MetroNews notes that "the album improves as it progresses; the horn-driven 'A Little Luck' and 'Cheatin' Heart Cafe', a duet with Travis Tritt, are substantial improvements, as is 'Sunburn,' with its snaky guitar intro".

Like Roth's earlier solo LP, Skyscraper (1988), Your Filthy Little Mouth met with a tepid response from listeners and critics who expected Roth to reproduce the hard rock sound of classic Van Halen; others criticized him for not distancing himself enough from the sound of classic-era Van Halen. In 2007, the album was remastered and re-released on the Friday music label.

"She's My Machine" became a rock radio hit in early 1994, reaching #12 on Billboard's Rock Charts.

== Track listing ==
All tracks are written by Terry Kilgore and David Lee Roth, except where noted.

| No. | Title | Writer(s) | Length |
|---|---|---|---|
| 1. | "She's My Machine" | Monty Byrom; David Neuhauser; Roth | 3:53 |
| 2. | "Everybody's Got the Monkey" | Frank Simes; Joey Hunting; Roth | 3:01 |
| 3. | "Big Train" | Kilgore; Roth; Hunting; Preston Sturges | 4:14 |
| 4. | "Experience" | | 5:54 |
| 5. | "A Little Luck" | Eddie Anderson; Steve Hunter; Roth | 4:40 |
| 6. | "Cheatin' Heart Cafe" | | 4:06 |
| 7. | "Hey, You Never Know" | | 2:46 |
| 8. | "No Big 'Ting" | | 4:51 |
| 9. | "You're Breathin' It" | Richard Hilton; Kilgore; Roth | 3:46 |
| 10. | "Your Filthy Little Mouth" | | 3:02 |
| 11. | "Land's Edge" | | 3:12 |
| 12. | "Night Life" (Willie Nelson cover) | Walt Breeland; Paul Buskirk; Willie Nelson | 3:35 |
| 13. | "Sunburn" | | 4:42 |
| 14. | "You're Breathin' It" (Urban NYC Mix) | Hilton; Kilgore; Roth | 4:13 |
| Total length: | | | 55:55 |

Japanese bonus track
| No. | Title | Writer(s) | Length |
|---|---|---|---|
| 15. | "Mississippi Power" | Sturges; Roth | 5:08 |
| Total length: | | | 61:08 |

== Personnel ==
Musicians

- David Lee Roth – lead vocals
- Richard Hilton – keyboards, programming
- Terry Kilgore – guitars
- Steve Hunter – rhythm guitar (5)
- John Regan – bass
- Tony Beard – drums
- Larry Aberman – drums
- Ray Brinker – drums
- Tawatha Agee – backing vocals
- Robin Clark – backing vocals
- Maryel Epps – backing vocals
- Brenda White-King – backing vocals
- Travis Tritt – co-lead vocals (6)
- Mitchielous – rap (8)

Production and Technical

- Nile Rodgers – producer
- Gary Tole – recording, mixing
- Jon Goldberger – additional engineer
- Andrew Grassi – assistant engineer
- George Marino – mastering at Sterling Sound (New York, NY)
- Anthony Aquilato – drum technician
- Artie Smith – drum technician, guitar technician
- Ralph Legnini – guitar technician
- Rudy Leiren – guitar technician
- Budd Tunick – production coordinator
- Michael Comiskey – art direction
- Jonathan Shlafer – art direction
- Joseph M. Volpicelli – art direction
- Margo Chase – logo design, logo typography
- Abel Rocha – illustration
- Greg Gorman – photography
- Paul Aresu – photography
- Eddie Anderson – personal manager
- Steve Barnett and Stewart Young at Hard To Handle Management – management

== Charts ==
Chart performance for Your Filthy Little Mouth
| Chart (1994) | Peak position |
|---|---|
| Australian Albums (ARIA) | 91 |
| Finnish Albums (Suomen virallinen lista) | 62 |
| German Albums (Offizielle Top 100) | 62 |
| Japanese Albums (Oricon) | 26 |
| Scottish Albums (Official Charts) | 43 |
| Swedish Albums (Sverigetopplistan) | 23 |
| Swiss Albums (Schweizer Hitparade) | 25 |
| UK Albums (Official Charts) | 28 |
| US Billboard 200 | 78 |
