= A Little Ain't Enough =

Studio album by David Lee Roth
- Released: January 15, 1991
- Recorded: 1990
- Studio: Little Mountain (Vancouver)
- Genres: Hard rock; glam metal
- Length: 53:10
- Label: Warner Bros.
- Producer: Bob Rock

David Lee Roth chronology
Skyscraper (1988)	A Little Ain't Enough (1991)	Your Filthy Little Mouth (1994)

Professional ratings
Review scores
Source	Rating
AllMusic	2/5 stars
Entertainment Weekly	B+
Los Angeles Times	2.5/5 stars
Rolling Stone	2/5 stars

A Little Ain't Enough is the third full-length studio album by David Lee Roth, released on January 15, 1991, through Warner Music Group. It was certified gold on April 11, 1991. Produced by Bob Rock, the album featured the lead guitar work of Jason Becker, a then up-and-coming guitarist who was diagnosed with amyotrophic lateral sclerosis (ALS, a.k.a. Lou Gehrig's disease) a week after joining the band. He managed to finish recording the album, but was unable to tour in support of the album, as his condition left him with little strength in his hands.

The album marked the beginning of Roth's commercial decline, given the drop-off in sales from his prior two albums. During the year of the album's release, the Seattle grunge movement was beginning to see a change in rock, and Roth's brand of glam metal was considered, by mainstream audiences, obsolete. Although the album went out of print on the Warner Bros. label in 1996, it was reissued (in remastered form) in 2007 through the Friday Music label.

== Release ==
A music video for the title track, "A Lil' Ain't Enough", received significant play on MTV.

The song "Hammerhead Shark" is a cover and partial rewrite of the song by the same title from the 1990 album Walking on a Wire by Lowen & Navarro.

== Tour ==
The tour supporting the record was successful in Europe, but the American leg, supported by Extreme and Cinderella, turned into a financial failure, with low attendance and a third of the shows cancelled due to poor ticket sales. Setlists were shortened and songs from the current album dropped as the US tour went on.

The touring band featured Ozzy Osbourne and Lizzy Borden guitarist Joe Holmes, bassist Todd Jensen from Hardline, longtime collaborators Gregg Bissonette and Brett Tuggle, and for the first few shows Desi Rexx from D'Molls as second guitarist.

== Track listing ==
No.	Title	Writer(s)	Length
1.	"A Lil' Ain't Enough"	Robbie Nevil; David Lee Roth	4:42
2.	"Shoot It"	Gregg Bissonette; Nevil; Roth; Brett Tuggle	4:13
3.	"Lady Luck"	Craig Goldy; Roth	4:40
4.	"Hammerhead Shark"	Eric Lowen; Roth; Preston Sturges	3:34
5.	"Tell the Truth"	Steve Hunter; Roth; Tuggle	5:18
6.	"Baby's on Fire"	Hunter; Roth; Tuggle	3:22
7.	"40 Below"	Hunter; Roth; Tuggle	4:54
8.	"Sensible Shoes"	Dennis Morgan; Roth; Sturges	5:09
9.	"Last Call"	Matt Bissonette; G. Bissonette; Rocket Ritchotte; Roth; Tuggle	3:22
10.	"The Dogtown Shuffle"	Hunter; Roth; Tuggle	4:58
11.	"It's Showtime!"	Jason Becker; Roth	3:46
12.	"Drop in the Bucket"	Becker; Roth	5:05
Total length:			53:03

== Personnel ==
- David Lee Roth – vocals, harmonica, concept
- Jason Becker – lead guitar
- Steve Hunter – slide guitar, rhythm guitar
- Brett Tuggle – keyboards, vocals
- John Webster – keyboards
- Matt Bissonette – bass, vocals
- Gregg Bissonette – drums, percussion
- Jim McGillveray – percussion
- Derry Byrne – brass
- Tom Keenlyside – brass
- Ian Putz – brass
- Marc LaFrance – backing vocals
- David Steele – backing vocals
- Bob Rock – producer, mixing
- Randy Staub – engineer
- Chris Taylor – engineer
- Brian Dobbs – engineer
- George Marino – mastering
- Pete Angelus – concept
- Jim Pezzullo – art direction, design

== Charts ==
Chart (1991)	Peak position
Australian Albums (ARIA)	26
Austrian Albums (Ö3 Austria)	22
Canada Top Albums/CDs (RPM)	21
Dutch Albums (Album Top 100)	30
Finnish Albums (Suomen virallinen lista)	1
German Albums (Offizielle Top 100)	12
Japanese Albums (Oricon)	17
Norwegian Albums (VG-lista)	9
Swedish Albums (Sverigetopplistan)	11
Swiss Albums (Schweizer Hitparade)	5
UK Albums (Official Charts)	4
US Billboard 200	18

== Certifications ==
Region	Certification	Certified units/sales
Canada (Music Canada)	Gold	50,000^{^}
United Kingdom (BPI)	Silver	60,000^{^}
United States (RIAA)	Gold	500,000^{^}
^{^} Shipments figures based on certification alone.
