= Skyscraper (album) =

Studio album by David Lee Roth
- Released: January 21, 1988
- Recorded: Spring – Autumn 1987
- Studios: Capitol (Hollywood); Stucco Blue (Los Angeles); Smoketree (Los Angeles)
- Genres: Hard rock; glam metal
- Length: 41:23
- Label: Warner Bros.
- Producers: David Lee Roth, Steve Vai

David Lee Roth chronology
Eat 'Em and Smile (1986)	Skyscraper (1988)	A Little Ain't Enough (1991)

Singles from Skyscraper
- 1. "Just Like Paradise" Released: December 1987; 2. "Stand Up" Released: April 1988; 3. "Damn Good" Released: July 1988

Skyscraper is the second full-length studio album by David Lee Roth, released during his solo career after his departure from Van Halen. It was released on January 21, 1988, on Warner Bros. Records, shortly after the commercially and critically successful Eat 'Em and Smile Tour of 1986–1987.

== Background ==
"Damn Good" is based on a song that Steve Vai composed when he was 14 years old. In the recording, in addition to a standard electric guitar, he used a six-string acoustic guitar and a twelve-string acoustic guitar from the Guild Guitar Company, as well as a Coral sitar. The album cover features a photograph of Roth climbing Half Dome in Yosemite Valley, taken by adventure photographer Galen Rowell.

After the recording was completed, Billy Sheehan left the band. In a 2013 interview with ultimateclassicrock.com, Sheehan reflected, "Skyscraper sounded a bit overproduced to me, and it is not my favorite album." Matt Bissonette, the brother of Gregg Bissonette, subsequently joined as the new bassist.

== Development ==
In a 2022 interview with Eonmusic, Vai said that the song "Damn Good" was developed from a piece called "Scandinavian Air Solo", originally slated to appear on his Passion and Warfare album.

== Reception ==
Professional ratings
Review scores
Source	Rating
AllMusic	3.5/5 stars
Christgau’s Consumer Guide	C+
Collector's Guide to Heavy Metal	8/10
The Daily Vault	C−
Kerrang!	3/5 stars
Los Angeles Times	3/4 stars
Rolling Stone	2/5 stars

Skyscraper received divided public and critical opinion. Although Roth's 1988 Skyscraper Tour was successful, many fans and critics were disappointed by Van Halen's post-Roth, keyboard-heavy sound and expressed similar dissatisfaction with Skyscraper.

Skyscraper hit No. 6 on the Billboard Top 200 U.S. album chart during February 1988, toward selling one million copies in the United States. "Just Like Paradise" is one of Roth's most popular singles, reaching No. 6 on the U.S. Billboard Hot 100 chart. The acoustic ballad "Damn Good" reached No. 2 on the U.S. Billboard Rock chart.

Cash Box called "Stand Up" an "engaging, catchy rock song, with a funky danceable groove" and "Damn Good" a "satisfying and artistic effort".

=== Tour ===
In Kerrang! magazine, Mick Wall reviewed a Worcester Centrum concert in 1987, saying, "There's nothing humourless and tense about a David Lee Roth show; it's just straight up, high times excitement! Nothing ever stops moving - the music, the band, the lights, him least of all ... Kid, you gotta be ready when this stuff comes at you, otherwise you'll miss something and get left behind!" Neil Jeffries reviewed the Monsters of Rock performance at Castle Donington in 1988, "This was the way to play Donington. Grab the audience by the lapels, get the band to play a killer set and then hit the crowd with the sucker punch - make 'em laugh."

In a retrospective review in 2012 of a Hirsch Memorial Coliseum concert in 1988, Fred Phillips said, "Sure, the singing wasn't perfect while he was doing all that stuff, but they never were. And nobody cared. With his flashy outfits and outlandish performance, he was a rock star in the fullest sense of the word for those couple of hours, and he had the crowd in the palm of his hand."

In 2024, former David Lee Roth bassist Billy Sheehan dispelled rumors of stage duct tape blocking instrumentalists away from Roth's space in the Eat 'Em and Smile tour, but: "It did exist on the Skyscraper tour. One of the reasons I wasn't there."

=== Charts ===
==== Weekly ====
Chart performance for Skyscraper
Chart (1988–1990)	Peak position
Australian Albums (Kent Music Report)	14
Canada Top Albums/CDs (RPM)	6
Dutch Albums (Album Top 100)	39
European Albums (IFPI)	31
Finnish Albums (Suomen virallinen lista)	1
German Albums (Offizielle Top 100)	28
Japanese Albums (Oricon)	7
New Zealand Albums (RMNZ)	12
Norwegian Albums (VG-lista)	9
Swedish Albums (Sverigetopplistan)	13
Swiss Albums (Schweizer Hitparade)	13
UK Albums (Official Charts)	11
US Billboard 200	6

=== Certifications ===
Region	Certification	Certified units/sales
United Kingdom (BPI)	Silver	60,000^{^}
United States (RIAA)	Platinum	1,000,000^{^}
^{^} Shipments figures based on certification alone.

== Track listing ==
=== U.S. release ===
All tracks are written by David Lee Roth and Steve Vai, except where noted.

Side one
No.	Title	Writer(s)	Length
1.	"Knucklebones"	Gregg Bissonette; Matt Bissonette; Roth	3:18
2.	"Just Like Paradise"	Roth; Brett Tuggle	4:03
3.	"The Bottom Line"		3:38
4.	"Skyscraper"		3:40
5.	"Damn Good"		5:49

Side two
No.	Title	Writer(s)	Length
1.	"Hot Dog and a Shake"		3:19
2.	"Stand Up"	Roth; Tuggle	4:39
3.	"Hina"		4:41
4.	"Perfect Timing"	Roth; Tuggle	3:41
5.	"Two Fools a Minute"		4:29
Total length:			41:23

=== European CD reissue ===
No.	Title	Writer(s)	Length
1.	"California Girls" (The Beach Boys cover)	Brian Wilson; Mike Love	2:51
2.	"Medley: Just a Gigolo / I Ain't Got Nobody" (Louis Prima cover)	Irving Caesar; Leonello Casucci; Roger A. Graham; Spencer Williams; Sam Butera (arrangement)	4:42
3.	"Knucklebones"	G. Bissonette; M. Bissonette; Roth	3:18
4.	"Just Like Paradise"	Roth; Tuggle	4:03
5.	"The Bottom Line"		3:38
6.	"Skyscraper"		3:40
7.	"Damn Good"		5:49
8.	"Hot Dog and a Shake"		3:19
9.	"Stand Up"	Roth; Tuggle	4:39
10.	"Hina"		4:41
11.	"Perfect Timing"	Roth; Tuggle	3:41
12.	"Two Fools a Minute"		4:29
Total length:			48:56

== Personnel ==
- David Lee Roth – vocals

The band

- Steve Vai – guitar, horn (alto)
- Billy Sheehan – bass guitar, backing vocals
- Gregg Bissonette – drums, percussion, backing vocals
- Brett Tuggle – keyboards, programming, backing vocals

Guest musicians

- Gary Falcone – backing vocals on tracks 1 and 9
- Joe Pizzulo – backing vocals on track 1
- Tommy Funderburk, Tom Kelly – backing vocals on track 2
- John Batdorf – backing vocals on track 9
- Magic Moreno – backing vocals on track 10
- Dr. Funk, PhD – bass synthesizer
- Todd Grace, Richie Raposa – programming, keyboard programming

Production

- David Lee Roth – producer, concept, cover design
- Steve Vai – co-producer, engineer
- Magic Moreno – engineer, mixing
- Gary Wagner – engineer
- Doug Parry – engineer
- Paul Levy – engineer
- Steve Holroyd – engineer
- Marnie Riley – engineer
- Stephen Shelton – engineer
- Bob Cats – mixing
- Bernie Grundman – mastering
- Pete Angelus – concept, cover design
- Galen Rowell – photography
- Vigon Seireeni – artwork
- Gina Vivona – artwork
- Eddie Anderson – personal assistant
