= Crazy from the Heat =

EP by David Lee Roth
- Released: January 28, 1985
- Recorded: 1984
- Studios: Power Station, New York City; Lion Share, Los Angeles; Amigo, North Hollywood
- Genre: Pop rock
- Length: 14:06
- Labels: Warner Bros. 25222
- Producer: Ted Templeman

David Lee Roth chronology
Crazy from the Heat (1985)	Eat 'Em and Smile (1986)

Crazy from the Heat is a 1985 EP by American rock musician David Lee Roth. His debut solo recording, it was released while Roth was still lead singer for Van Halen, though he parted ways with the band several weeks later and launched a solo career. The EP is certified platinum by the RIAA, having sold more than one million copies in the United States.

Professional ratings
Review scores
Source	Rating
AllMusic	4/5 stars
Robert Christgau	B
Rolling Stone	3/5 stars

== Background ==
Crazy from the Heat consists of cover versions of songs of a decidedly dissimilar style from Roth's previous work with Van Halen. The song "Easy Street" was originally recorded by The Edgar Winter Group, while "Coconut Grove" was originally recorded by The Lovin' Spoonful.

The medley of "Just a Gigolo" and "I Ain't Got Nobody" is based on Louis Prima's 1956 medley combining two pre-World War II songs. This version peaked at number 12 on the Billboard Hot 100, supported by a well-received music video. Roth's version of the well-known Beach Boys' hit "California Girls" peaked at number 3 on the Billboard Hot 100, the same position that the Beach Boys' original rendition reached 20 years prior.

According to the EP's liner notes, the cover picture of Roth was shot in the Seychelle Islands.

Roth used the title of the EP for his 1997 autobiography, Crazy from the Heat, and his future solo song "Goin' Crazy" uses the line "Goin Crazy... from the heat."

== Track listing ==
Side one
No.	Title	Writer(s)	Length
1.	"Easy Street" (Edgar Winter Group cover)	Dan Hartman	3:45
2.	"Medley: Just a Gigolo / I Ain't Got Nobody" (Louis Prima cover)	Irving Caesar; Leonello Casucci; Roger A. Graham; Spencer Williams; Sam Butera (arrangement)	4:39

Side two
No.	Title	Writer(s)	Length
1.	"California Girls" (The Beach Boys cover)	Brian Wilson; Mike Love	2:50
2.	"Coconut Grove" (The Lovin' Spoonful cover)	John Sebastian; Zal Yanovsky	2:52
Total length:			14:06

== Personnel ==
- David Lee Roth – vocals
- Dean Parks – guitar on "Coconut Grove"
- Eddie Martinez – guitars
- Sid McGinnis – guitars
- Willie Weeks – bass guitar
- John Robinson – drums
- Sammy Figueroa – percussion
- James Newton Howard – synthesizers on "Coconut Grove"
- Edgar Winter – keyboards, synthesizer, saxophone and backing vocals on tracks 1, 2 & 3
- Brian Mann – synthesizer
- Carl Wilson – backing vocals on "California Girls"
- Christopher Cross – backing vocals on "California Girls"

== Charts ==
Album

Chart (1985)	Peak position
Canada Top Albums/CDs (RPM)	14
New Zealand Albums (RMNZ)	21
UK Albums (Official Charts)	91
US Billboard 200	15

Singles

Year	Title	Chart	Position
1985	"California Girls"	US Adult Contemporary	29
1985	"California Girls"	US Billboard Hot 100	3
1985	"California Girls"	US Mainstream Rock Tracks	3
1985	"Easy Street"	US Mainstream Rock Tracks	14
1985	"Medley: Just a Gigolo/I Ain't Got Nobody"	US Mainstream Rock Tracks	25
1985	"Medley: Just a Gigolo/I Ain't Got Nobody"	US Billboard Hot 100	12

== Certifications ==
Region	Certification	Certified units/sales
United States (RIAA)	Platinum	1,000,000^{^}
^{^} Shipments figures based on certification alone.
