= Eat 'Em and Smile =

Studio album by David Lee Roth
- Released: July 7, 1986
- Studios: Power Station, New York City; Fantasy, Berkeley, California; Can-Am, Tarzana, California
- Genres: Hard rock; glam metal; disco metal
- Length: 31:04
- Label: Warner Bros.
- Producer: Ted Templeman

David Lee Roth chronology
Crazy from the Heat (1985)	Eat 'Em and Smile (1986)	Skyscraper (1988)

Singles from Eat 'Em and Smile
- 1. "Yankee Rose" Released: June 18, 1986; 2. "Goin' Crazy!" Released: September 3, 1986; 3. "That's Life" Released: November 1986; 4. "I'm Easy" Released: March 10, 1987 (Japan)

Eat 'Em and Smile is the debut studio album by former Van Halen singer David Lee Roth, released on July 7, 1986. It follows his successful debut EP Crazy from the Heat (1985). The album was certified platinum in the U.S., selling over a million copies.

== History ==
=== Background ===
After releasing Crazy from the Heat, an EP of lounge standards that became a surprise hit during early 1985, and subsequently parting ways with Van Halen while the band was at its commercial zenith, Roth assembled a new backing band: bassist Billy Sheehan (later of Mr. Big); drummer Gregg Bissonette (later of Ringo Starr's All-Starr Band); and virtuoso guitarist Steve Vai, who had played with Frank Zappa, PiL, and Alcatrazz.

Roth later said that the songs written for the album were originally intended to form the soundtrack to a film, Crazy from the Heat, which was never made.

The phrase "Eat 'Em and Smile" was part of a trademark registered in 1928 by the now-defunct Ward-Owsley Co candy company in Aberdeen, South Dakota.

=== Production ===
Two of the album's original songs became its biggest hits. "Yankee Rose", a tongue-in-cheek tribute to the Statue of Liberty, became an MTV and radio hit, rising into the Billboard Top 20. "Goin' Crazy!", the would-be theme to Roth's then-planned movie, also became an MTV staple, reaching #66 on Billboard's Hot 100 in October 1986.

Similar to his preceding EP, Roth included two lounge song covers on Eat 'Em and Smile: "That's Life", which became a minor hit at the end of 1986, with a video featuring clips of previous Roth and Van Halen videos being in heavy rotation on MTV, and "I'm Easy". A third cover is John D. Loudermilk's folk-blues song "Tobacco Road", and Billy Sheehan brought in "Shy Boy", a composition from his previous band Talas. The remainder of the songs were written by Roth and Vai.

A cover version of "Kids in Action", written by Kim Mitchell of the band Max Webster, was recorded for the album. Sheehan had briefly been a member of Max Webster. According to Mitchell:

It didn't work out. There were no hard feelings and he went on and did really well. I got a call from him one day and he goes, "Hey, man, I'm in the studio with David Lee Roth, Ted Templeman, and Steve Vai and we're covering your tune 'Kids in Action' and we need the words to the second verse." I was shaking on the phone. This was right after Roth left Van Halen. Then at the last minute it got bumped off the record for 'Tobacco Road.'

This is the first of two Roth albums to feature the duo of Steve Vai and Billy Sheehan on guitar and bass respectively. Throughout the album the two often synced complicated basslines and lead guitar parts, as on tracks such as "Shyboy" and "Elephant Gun". The album brought Steve Vai into the public eye as an accomplished replacement for Eddie Van Halen, the previous guitarist who worked with Roth. This album features some of Steve Vai's most renowned guitar work.

=== Sonrisa Salvaje ===
Sonrisa Salvaje (literally "Wild Smile") is the Spanish-language version of Eat 'Em and Smile. According to the Van Halen Encyclopedia, the idea to re-record the album in Spanish was the idea of bassist Billy Sheehan, who had read an article in a magazine which reported that over half the Mexican population was between the ages of 18 and 27, a prime record buying market. Roth re-cut all his vocals with the help of a Spanish tutor in the studio. He edited some of the risqué lyrics, so as not to offend the more conservative Spanish-speaking population. With the exception of the vocals, the basic music tracks are the same as the Eat 'Em and Smile version, with the only exception being "Big Trouble", which ends abruptly as opposed to fading out on the English version.

According to Sheehan, the album was not well received, with many people considering it "gringo Spanish". Any future Spanish-version ideas were dropped. Sonrisa Salvaje was originally released on vinyl and cassette, but deleted almost immediately; a CD version did not appear until 2007. All of the liner notes on the original release were written in Spanish, except for the copyright notice and the Dolby noise reduction information on the cassette version.

=== 30th anniversary attempt ===
In 2015, a live concert for the 30th anniversary was planned featuring Vai, Sheehan, Bissonette, and keyboardist Brett Tuggle. Initially Michael Starr was going to sing, but at the last minute Roth arrived at the venue. Due to safety measures and the overwhelmed capacity of the venue, fire marshals shut down the show.

== Reception ==
Professional ratings
Review scores
Source	Rating
AllMusic	4.5/5 stars
Christgau’s Consumer Guide	B+
Collector's Guide to Heavy Metal	7/10
Kerrang!	4.5/5 stars
Rolling Stone	favorable
The Rolling Stone Album Guide	2/5 stars
The Virgin Encyclopedia of Heavy Rock	2/5 stars

The album was a critical and commercial success. Many reviews compared Eat 'Em and Smile with Van Halen's synth-heavy 5150 (which featured Roth's replacement Sammy Hagar), often favorably. Rolling Stone wrote "No song on the album was as slick as any of the singles from Van Halen's 5150 album", and opined that Eat 'Em and Smile was much more "trashy fun".

Daniel Brogan of the Chicago Tribune called it a "manic spree" where Steve Vai's "stinging guitar work" is the most appealing component. Terry Atkinson of the Los Angeles Times wrote, "And the Ted Templeman-produced Eat 'Em, which stands up well alongside the best Van Halen albums, features the Roth you know: rock's answer to those pop-eyed libidinous wolves of the old Tex Avery cartoons." Eat 'Em and Smile was named "album of the year" by Kerrang! for 1986.

In 2002, Spin ranked Eat 'Em and Smile at number 32 in their list of the "40 Greatest Metal Albums of All Time", with contributor Chuck Klosterman calling it "actually the last great Van Halen album: disco-metal in the epicurean spirit of Diver Down, mathematically shredded by Steve Vai and blasted by Roth's elephant gun. Dave butchers 'That's Life' at the end, but it makes perfect, beautiful sense–if he's not the hair-metal Sinatra, who is?" In his 1991 list of the best heavy metal albums, Chuck Eddy placed it at number 185, hailing Roth as "thee consummate entertainer of our era" and commenting that the album "takes hard rock's inevitable future as showbiz glitz for granted". Though he felt the sound was sometimes too sloppy, Eddy praised how "[e]verything from the Statue of Liberty to Steve Vai's dynamite-detonation-as-parody-of-guitar-wank to group groupie-grope to how Dave's diction dives towards high notes is milked for laffs."

Colin Larkin opined in The Virgin Encyclopedia of Heavy Rock (1999) that Eat 'Em and Smile contains "an amazing selection of blistering rockers and offbeat, big production numbers", adding that it demonstrated that Roth remained a great showman. He also believes the album is "technically superb and infused with an irreverent sense of 'Yankee' humour." Eddy similarly noted that Roth appeared rejuvenated by the "South Bronx bravado that's his only eighties rival". In The Rough Guide to Rock (1999), Charles Bottomley wrote that the album's "extravagant techno-metal" was provided by Vai, adding that it "swaggered" into the UK Top 30 and U.S. Top 10. Eduardo Rivadavia of AllMusic believed Roth surrounded himself with "musicians of impeccable pedigree" to both move past the comedic edge of his debut EP and to "out-Van Halen Van Halen", praising the album for providing "a more than adequate substitute" for the more commercial sound of Van Halen under Sammy Hagar, and highlighting "Ladies Nite in Buffalo?" as arguably Roth's "most legitimate piece of art ever.

Bryan Rolli of Ultimate Classic Rock described "Ladies' Nite in Buffalo?" as "the best and boldest song to come from any Van Halen album since 1984".

=== Tour ===
In 1987, Kerrang! magazine reviewed the Cobo Hall concert, calling it "One of the best shows I've ever witnessed" and "Pure entertainment with a sense of surprise. No one is better at this than DLR. Believe it!"

In 2016, Ultimate Classic Rock's retrospective review said, "With help from touring keyboardist Brett Tuggle, the foursome tore through a set list that included an equal blend of Van Halen classics and songs from its new album each night, livening up Roth's traditional pre-'Ice Cream Man' storytelling introduction with a steel drum solo, and turning bass and guitar virtuosos Sheehan and Vai loose for an extended duel."

In 2024, Billy Sheehan denied a rumor that there was a "duct tape line" on the stage during this tour that band members besides Roth could not cross. However, that became true of the Skyscraper tour and is why he did not join it.

=== Charts ===
==== Weekly charts ====
Chart (1986)	Peak position
Australia Albums (Kent Music Report)	26
Canada Top Albums/CDs (RPM)	13
Dutch Albums (Album Top 100)	57
Finnish Albums (The Official Finnish Charts)	5
German Albums (Offizielle Top 100)	51
Japanese Albums (Oricon)	9
New Zealand Albums (RMNZ)	50
Norwegian Albums (VG-lista)	17
Swedish Albums (Sverigetopplistan)	12
Swiss Albums (Schweizer Hitparade)	29
UK Albums (Official Charts)	28
US Billboard 200	4

==== Year-end charts ====
Chart (1986)	Position
US Billboard 200	84

==== Certifications ====
Region	Certification	Certified units/sales
United Kingdom (BPI)	Gold	100,000^{^}
United States (RIAA)	Platinum	1,000,000^{^}
^{^} Shipments figures based on certification alone.

== Track listing ==
Instead of the typical A-side and B-side, the vinyl artwork showed the track listing on one side of the disc, as the A-side had a photograph of Roth in-costume.

All tracks are written by David Lee Roth and Steve Vai, except where noted.

Side one
No.	Title	Writer(s)	Sonrisa Salvaje title	Length
1.	"Yankee Rose"		"Yankee Rose"	3:55
2.	"Shyboy"	Billy Sheehan	"Tímido"	3:24
3.	"I'm Easy"	Billy Field; Tom Price	"Soy Fácil"	2:11
4.	"Ladies' Nite in Buffalo?"		"Noche de Ronda en la Ciudad"	4:08
5.	"Goin' Crazy!"		"¡Loco del calor!"	3:10

Side two
No.	Title	Writer(s)	Sonrisa Salvaje title	Length
6.	"Tobacco Road" (The Nashville Teens cover)	John D. Loudermilk	"La Calle del Tabaco"	2:29
7.	"Elephant Gun"		"Arma de Caza Mayor"	2:26
8.	"Big Trouble"		"En busca de pleito"	3:59
9.	"Bump and Grind"		"Cuánto Frenesí"	2:32
10.	"That's Life" (Frank Sinatra cover)	Dean Kay; Kelly Gordon	"Así es la Vida"	2:45
Total length:				31:04

== Personnel ==
- David Lee Roth – vocals, backing vocals
- Steve Vai – guitars, horn arrangement on 3
- Billy Sheehan – bass, backing vocals on 2, 3, 5, and 6
- Gregg Bissonette – drums, backing vocals on 3

=== Additional personnel ===
- Jeff Bova – keyboards on 1
- Jesse Harms – keyboards on 5
- Sammy Figueroa – percussion on 5
- The Waters Family – backing vocals on 10
- The Sidney Sharp Strings – strings on 10
- Jimmie Haskell – horn and string arrangement on 10
