= California Girls =

1965 song by the Beach Boys

- U.S. picture sleeve

Single by the Beach Boys

from the album Summer Days (And Summer Nights!!)
- B-side: "Let Him Run Wild"
- Released: July 12, 1965
- Recorded: April 6 – June 4, 1965
- Studio: Western and Columbia, Hollywood
- Genre: Pop rock; art pop
- Length: 2:46
- Label: Capitol
- Songwriters: Brian Wilson; Mike Love
- Producer: Brian Wilson

The Beach Boys singles chronology
"Help Me, Rhonda" (1965)	"California Girls" (1965)	"The Little Girl I Once Knew" (1965)

Audio sample
- file; help

"California Girls" is a song by the American rock band the Beach Boys from their 1965 album Summer Days (And Summer Nights!!). Written by Brian Wilson and Mike Love, the lyrics were partly inspired by the band's experiences touring Europe for the first time, detailing an appreciation for American women. It was released as a single, backed with "Let Him Run Wild", and reached number 3 on the Billboard Hot 100. It was also a top 10 hit in several other countries, becoming one of the band's most successful songs globally.

Wilson conceived "California Girls" during his first acid trip while thinking about women and Western film scores. The song is distinguished for its orchestral prelude, layered vocals, and chromaticism. Wilson later referred to it as "a hymn to youth", the Beach Boys' "anthem", and his favorite record by the group, although he remained dissatisfied with their vocal performance. It was the band's first recording with touring musician Bruce Johnston, who was not yet an official member of the group.

"California Girls" inspired the Beatles' parody "Back in the U.S.S.R." and many songs with similar or identical titles, including Big Star's "September Gurls", the Magnetic Fields' "California Girls", and Katy Perry's "California Gurls". In 1984, David Lee Roth recorded a cover version that also peaked at number 3. In 2010, the Beach Boys' recording was inducted into the Grammy Hall of Fame, and in 2011, Rolling Stone ranked it number 72 on its list of the greatest songs of all time. The Rock and Roll Hall of Fame included it as one of "500 Songs That Shaped Rock and Roll".

== Background ==
A lot of [our] songs are the results of emotional experiences, sadness and pain. Or joy, exultation, and so on. Like "California Girls"—a hymn to youth.

— Brian Wilson, 1966

Brian Wilson, according to some accounts, was inspired to write "California Girls" during his first time taking the psychedelic drug LSD, an occasion supervised by his friend Loren Schwartz. Wilson corroborated in the 2004 documentary Beautiful Dreamer that he had written the song while on his first acid trip, but in the 2021 documentary Long Promised Road, he stated that he wrote the song during the week after the trip, when he was sober.

In a 2007 interview, Wilson explained that he had gone to his piano and "was thinking about the music from cowboy movies. And I sat down and started playing it, bum-buhdeeda, bum-buhdeeda. I did that for about an hour. I got these chords going. Then I got this melody, it came pretty fast after that." He said that "California Girls" was intended to encapsulate the feel of the Drifters' version of "On Broadway". and on other occasions, said that the shuffle beat in the song was influenced by Bach's "Jesu, Joy of Man's Desiring".

The next day, as Wilson recalled, he and his bandmate Mike Love finished the remainder of the song. Love was not originally listed as the song's co-writer, but was awarded a credit after his successful 1990s lawsuit for songwriting credits. He said that he approached Wilson about the omission when the song was released, and that Wilson had told him that the mistake was the fault of Wilson's father Murry, the band's publisher. In a 1988 interview, Brian blamed himself. "I knew that my dad made a mistake by putting my name on there only." Session musician Carol Kaye, who played on the recording, credited all the music to Wilson, with the only exception being a bass fill she invented at the end of the bridge section.

Wilson and Love later disagreed over the extent of their lyrical contributions. Love said that he wrote "every syllable" of the song apart from "I wish they all could be California girls". In his recollection, he wrote the lyrics "in less than an hour" while he was in the hallway of the recording studio during the session for the backing track. (Note: In a 2018 interview, Bruce Johnston supported, "I watched Mike in the hallway ... sit with a yellow legal pad and write the lyrics ... He spent a couple hours while the track was being done.") Wilson disputed Love's assertion. "I wrote a lot of those lyrics too; it was line for line, back and forth between us. That's what happened." He said that he came up with the opening lines and subject matter, and that "Every other line was his or mine. ... Everybody loves girls, right? Everybody loves California and the sun. That’s what I wanted from the song. And to mention all the parts of the country, that’s fun, people will like that."

== Lyrics ==
Some people misunderstood and thought we were saying that California girls were best, but California is a microcosm of the US, which is the microcosm of the world, and we were trying to be inclusive.

— Mike Love, 2018

The lyrics describe an appreciation for the qualities of girls from different regions of the United States, and the wish that "they all could be" in the narrator's home state of California. Among the qualities that the narrator appreciates are "East Coast girls" for being "hip", "southern girls" for "the way they talk", the "northern girls" for "the way they kiss", and the "Midwest farmer's daughter" for making "you feel all right". After the first chorus, the West Coast is invoked for its "sunshine" and tanned girls, with an additional reference to a "French bikini on Hawaii Island". At the end of the lyric, the singer declares that, having had the experience of seeing "all kinds of girls" from "all around this great big world", the U.S. contains "the cutest" of them all.

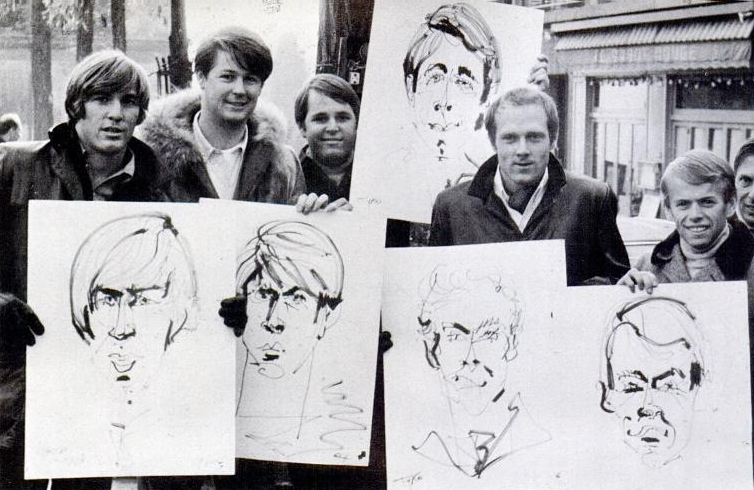
The Beach Boys in Europe, November 1964.

According to Love, the lyrics were inspired by the band's first time touring Europe and the UK in November 1964. He felt that he failed to impart the message that he had "originally intended" with the lyric. "I wanted the song to be a tribute to girls everywhere—not just in the United States, let alone California, but everywhere in the world." Biographer Mark Dillon wrote that Love's lyrics "show [that he keeps] concert-goers top of mind" and that the "Midwest farmer's daughter" line elicited the greatest applause when the group performed the song live.

== Composition ==
"California Girls" begins with an orchestral prelude and contains a similar chord sequence and call-and-response vocal lines as Wilson's previous song "Don't Hurt My Little Sister" from The Beach Boys Today!. According to writer Maury Dean, "Musically, 'California Girls' is an adventure in chromatics; any garage band trying to follow their bizarre ♭VII tidal wave of dipping and swooping chromatic major chords will have to buy the sheet music, or hire Sherlock Holmes to find the missing chords." Musicologist Walter Everett identifies the use of ♭VII — IV in the chorus to suggest a chromaticized major key with minor pentatonic inflections.

Music theorist Daniel Harrison compared the song to Wilson's later "God Only Knows", as both songs avoid a root-position tonic and suppress a cadential drive. The refrain alternates between the I and ii7 without ever meeting the expected V. Highlighting this, Harrison, citing an insight on the part of Everett, writes that the "wish that 'they all could be California girls' is, of course, impossible to realize; the inability of I-II to reach V, then, underscores this impossibility."

== Recording ==
On April 6, 1965, Wilson produced the backing track of "California Girls" (then given the working title "We Don't Know") with a host of session musicians at Western Studio in Hollywood. It required 44 takes before Wilson could deem a satisfactory performance, with the session concluding after midnight. Problems had arisen from the tempo and guitar part in the introduction, which fatigued Wilson, engineer Chuck Britz, and the dozen-plus session players.

The song did not appear to have lyrics or a title at this juncture, and Wilson can be heard calling the song "Oh Yeah" and "You're Grass and I'm a Power Mower". In his 2016 memoir, Wilson remembered: "When we got into the studio with Chuck, he said that he wanted Carl's twelve-string guitar in the intro to sound more direct. I didn’t know what that meant. 'Can he play it in the booth?' Chuck said. I had never thought about that before, but it seemed like a good idea. Carl was standing next to me in the booth and all the other musicians were out in the studio. I conducted it like an orchestra." According to biographer Peter Ames Carlin, Wilson's father Murry urged Brian to eliminate the orchestral prelude, as he felt that it made the song excessively complex.

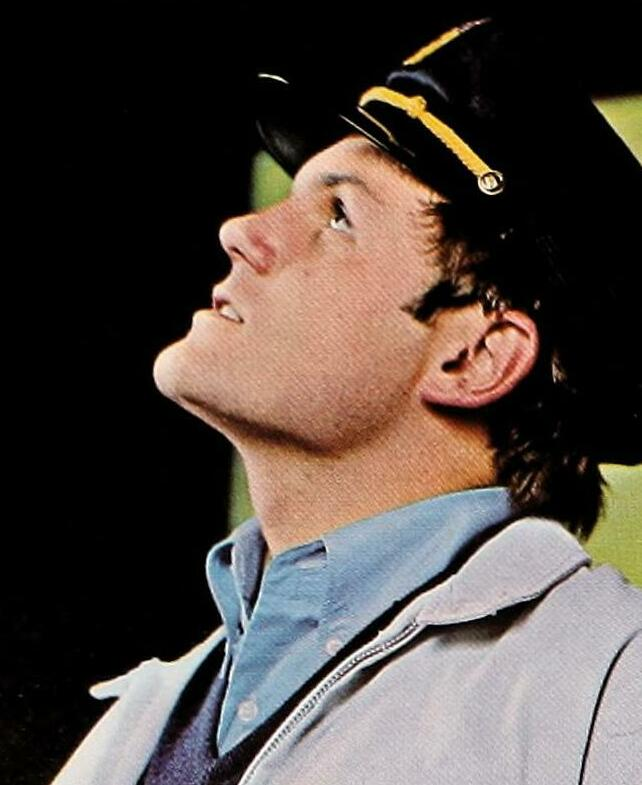
"California Girls" is the first Beach Boys recording with contributions from longtime member Bruce Johnston (pictured 1966)

"California Girls" was the first Beach Boys recording to feature vocals from Bruce Johnston, who had recently joined the group to substitute for Wilson on concert tours. Johnston remembered, "I came home from The Beach Boys' tour [on June 1] and they said, 'Why don't you come and sing on our next album?' The first song I sang on was 'California Girls'. At this point I still wasn't a proper member of the group."

Vocal overdubs followed on June 4 at Columbia studio. Wilson recorded the Beach Boys' vocals using Columbia's new 8-track recorder, allowing Love's and Brian's lead vocals to be double-tracked and the group's vocals spread over three more. According to historian Keith Badman, the song had still lacked "a proper title", as Wilson can be heard referring to it as "Yeah, I Dig the Girls" on the session tape.

== Release ==
On July 5, 1965, "California Girls" was released as the leading track on side two of the Beach Boys' album Summer Days (And Summer Nights!!). On July 12, it was issued as a single backed with "Let Him Run Wild". It debuted on the Billboard Top 40 chart at number 28, and at the end of August peaked at number 3, just below the Beatles' "Help!" and Bob Dylan's "Like a Rolling Stone". In the UK, the single was released in August. In September, it peaked at number 28 in the Netherlands. In October, it peaked at number 26 in the UK, 30 in Germany and 6 in Sweden.

Cash Box described the single as an "easy-going shuffle which touts the many positive aspects of the Golden Gate state distaffers." Record World described it as a "ballad with a beat extolling the Coast female" and called it an "extremely strong item."

The Beach Boys sang the song over a pre-recorded backing track during their appearances on the television programs The Andy Williams Show (on October 22) and Jack Benny Hour (on October 23). In the latter, the group were featured in a humorous sketch with host Jack Benny and comedian Bob Hope, who act as old surfers that are struggling to understand the sport's slang terms.

== Recognition and legacy ==
"California Girls" is among the Beach Boys' most commercially successful songs globally. It has been performed thousands of times in concert as the band's opening number. Carlin called the orchestral introduction "as spare and stirring as anything by Aaron Copland". Dillon referred to the passage as "one of pop music's great intros" and "Brian's proclamation to the rest of the music biz that he was a composer to take seriously". Los Angeles Times journalist Geoff Boucher, writing in his article about the song, said that the opening lyrics were "one of the most famous ... in pop music" and described the music as "equal parts symphony hall and amusement park, 2 1/2 minutes of nuanced musical complexity and beach-blanket simplicity." The song was also influential in the development of the power pop genre.

["California Girls" was] something I'm very proud of in a sense because it represents the Beach Boys really greatest record production we’ve ever made. It goes back to 1965 when I was sitting in my apartment, wondering how to write a song about girls, because I love girls. I mean, everybody loves girls.

— Brian Wilson, 1987

Wilson stated in an interview, "The intro to this song is the greatest piece of music I've ever written ... The song was a big record for us but I never really liked anything but the intro." In 1970, he said that he disliked the recorded vocal performance and added, "If I could, I'd re-record that one ... We rushed the beat on that one." In 2010, he told Dillon that it was the band's finest record and said, "You could call it our anthem."

In 2010, the Beach Boys' recording was inducted into the Grammy Hall of Fame for its "lasting qualitative or historical significance." In 2011, Rolling Stone magazine ranked it number 72 on its list of the "500 Greatest Songs of All Time", where it was described as "tougher than earlier Beach Boys hits, with tightly wound harmonies and an aggressive lead vocal."

=== Cultural references ===
The Beatles' "Back in the U.S.S.R." (1968) features a bridge section based on the song. Wilson said that the Beatles' song "blew my mind" when he first heard it, although he did not realize that it was a send-up of "California Girls" until the fact was pointed out to him. Strawberry Alarm Clock, who toured with the Beach Boys in 1966–67, segues into the intro and first line of "California Girls" at the end of their song "Small Package", on their album Good Morning Starshine (1969). (Note: The fadeout was keyboardist Mark Weitz's idea.) "California Girls" has also been adopted in numerous television commercials and jingles. It served as a tongue-in-cheek musical cue in the James Bond film A View to a Kill (1985). (Note: The rendition used in the film was a cover version by Gideon Park.)

"California Girls" inspired the titles of Big Star's "September Gurls" (1974) and identically named songs by Gretchen Wilson (from her 2006 album All Jacked Up) and the Magnetic Fields (from their 2008 album Distortion). The latter song describes a protagonist who wishes to murder upper-class girls from California with a battle axe, a theme that carried on from Sonic Youth's "Expressway to Yr. Skull" from Evol (1986). Katy Perry's "California Gurls" (2010) initiated a dispute with publisher Rondor Music regarding its use of the lyric "I wish they all could be California girls".

Magnetic Fields frontman Stephin Merritt commented on the various songs, "when I wrote [my] 'California Girls' ... the listener is supposed to know that there is already a song with that title. ... It would be good to write a response song to that [Katy Perry single]. An answer song, to be called 'California Grrrls,' g-r-r-r-l-s, about the Riot Grrrl alleged movement. One could go on and on with 'California Girls,' it’s a pretty large topic, with a lot to say."

=== David Lee Roth version ===
"California Girls"

Single by David Lee Roth

from the EP Crazy from the Heat
- Released: December 19, 1984
- Recorded: 1984
- Genre: Synth-pop
- Length: 2:50
- Label: Warner Bros.
- Songwriters: Brian Wilson; Mike Love
- Producer: Ted Templeman

David Lee Roth singles chronology
"California Girls" (1984)	"Just a Gigolo" (1985)

"California Girls" was covered by David Lee Roth on his 1985 EP Crazy from the Heat (with background vocals by Beach Boy Carl Wilson along with Christopher Cross). Like the original, it peaked at number 3 on the Billboard Hot 100. The Federico Fellini-esque music video, directed by Pete Angelus and Roth and inspired by Fellini's Amarcord, was released in January 1985. In the video, Roth stars as a tour guide, showing tourists the beach and swimsuit models. The scenes follow the lyrics with bikini-clad women from all regions of the US. Roth dances down a sidewalk bordered by models frozen like mannequins.

== Personnel ==
Per band archivist Craig Slowinski:

The Beach Boys

- Al Jardine – second tenor/baritone harmony and backing vocals
- Bruce Johnston – second tenor harmony and backing vocals
- Mike Love – lead and bass harmony vocals
- Brian Wilson – first tenor/falsetto harmony and backing vocals
- Carl Wilson – second tenor harmony and backing vocals, 12-string guitar
- Dennis Wilson – baritone harmony and backing vocals

Session musicians (also known as "the Wrecking Crew")

- Hal Blaine – drums
- Frank Capp – vibraphone
- Roy Caton – trumpet
- Jerry Cole – twelve-string guitar
- Al De Lory – Hammond B-3 organ
- Steve Douglas – tenor saxophone
- Jay Migliori – baritone saxophone
- Jack Nimitz – bass saxophone
- Carol Kaye – bass guitar
- Lyle Ritz – upright bass
- Howard Roberts – electric guitar
- Leon Russell – piano
- Billy Strange – tambourine

=== David Lee Roth version ===
Credits adapted from Apple Music.

- David Lee Roth - lead vocals
- Eddie Martinez - lead guitar
- Edgar Winter - synthesizer, backing vocals
- Brian Mann - synthesizer
- Sid McGinnis - guitar
- Willie Weeks - bass guitar
- John Robinson - drums
- Sammy Figueroa - percussion
- Carl Wilson - backing vocals
- Christopher Cross - backing vocals

== Charts ==
=== Weekly singles charts ===
Beach Boys version
Chart (1965–1966)	Peak position
Australia	58
Canada RPM Top Singles	2
Germany Hit Bilanz	30
Netherlands	28
New Zealand (Lever Hit Parade)	6
South Africa (Springbok Radio)	1
Sweden	6
UK Record Retailer	26
Japan Music Life	26
US Gilbert Youth Survey/Associated Press top 20	2
US Billboard Hot 100	3

David Lee Roth version
Chart (1985–1986)	Peak position
Australia (Kent Music Report)	6
Canada RPM Top Singles	8
Canada The Record Top Singles	7
Netherlands (Single Top 100)	44
New Zealand (Recorded Music NZ)	7
UK Singles (Official Charts Company)	68
US Billboard Hot 100	3
US Adult Contemporary (Billboard)	29

=== Year-end charts ===
Beach Boys version
Chart (1965)	Rank
US Billboard Hot 100	49
South Africa	16

David Lee Roth version
Chart (1985)	Rank
Australia (Kent Music Report)	79
Canada	63
US Top Pop Singles (Billboard)	88

== Certifications ==
Certifications for "California Girls"
Region	Certification	Certified units/sales
United Kingdom (BPI)	Silver	200,000^{‡}
United States (RIAA)	Platinum	1,000,000^{‡}
^{^} Shipments figures based on certification alone.^{‡} Sales+streaming figures based on certification alone.

== Bibliography ==
- Badman, Keith (2004). The Beach Boys: The Definitive Diary of America's Greatest Band, on Stage and in the Studio. Backbeat Books. ISBN 978-0-87930-818-6.
- Burlingame, Jon (2012). The Music of James Bond. Oxford University Press. ISBN 978-0-19-998676-7.
- Carlin, Peter Ames (2006). Catch a Wave: The Rise, Fall, and Redemption of the Beach Boys' Brian Wilson. Rodale. ISBN 978-1-59486-320-2.
- Dean, Maury (2003). Rock N Roll Gold Rush: A Singles Un-Cyclopedia. Algora Publishing. ISBN 978-0-87586-207-1.
- Dillon, Mark (2012). Fifty Sides of the Beach Boys: The Songs That Tell Their Story. ECW Press. ISBN 978-1-77090-198-8.
- Everett, Walter (2009). The Foundations of Rock: From "Blue Suede Shoes" to "Suite: Judy Blue Eyes". Oxford. ISBN 9780195310238.
- Gaines, Steven (1986). Heroes and Villains: The True Story of The Beach Boys (1. Da Capo Press ed.). New York: Da Capo Press. ISBN 0306806479.
- George-Warren, Holly (2014). A Man Called Destruction: The Life and Music of Alex Chilton, from Box Tops to Big Star to Backdoor Man. Viking. ISBN 978-0-670-02563-3.
- Granata, Charles L. (2003). Wouldn't it Be Nice: Brian Wilson and the Making of the Beach Boys' Pet Sounds. Chicago Review Press. ISBN 978-1-55652-507-0.
- Harrison, Daniel (1997). "After Sundown: The Beach Boys' Experimental Music" (PDF). In Covach, John; Boone, Graeme M. (eds.). Understanding Rock: Essays in Musical Analysis. Oxford University Press. pp. 33–57. ISBN 9780199880126. Archived from the original (PDF) on May 24, 2015.
- Love, Mike (2016). Good Vibrations: My Life as a Beach Boy. Penguin Publishing Group. ISBN 978-0-698-40886-9.
- McCulley, Jerry (1997) [1988]. "Trouble in Mind – A Revealing Interview with Brian Wilson". In Abbott, Kingsley (ed.). Back to the Beach: A Brian Wilson and the Beach Boys Reader (1st ed.). London: Helter Skelter. pp. 187–204. ISBN 978-1900924023.
- Pichaske, David R. (1981). The Poetry of Rock: the Golden Years. Ellis Press.
- White, Timothy (1996). The Nearest Faraway Place: Brian Wilson, the Beach Boys, and the Southern Californian Experience. Macmillan. ISBN 0333649370.
- Wilson, Brian; Greenman, Ben (2016). I Am Brian Wilson: A Memoir. Da Capo Press. ISBN 978-0-306-82307-7.
- Zollo, Paul (2016). More Songwriters on Songwriting. Hachette Books. ISBN 978-0-306-81799-1.
