= The Return of Captain Invincible =

- DVD cover
- Directed by: Philippe Mora
- Written by: Steven E. de Souza; Andrew Gaty
- Produced by: Andrew Gaty
- Starring: Alan Arkin; Christopher Lee; Kate Fitzpatrick; Bill Hunter
- Cinematography: Mike Molloy
- Edited by: John Scott
- Music by: Richard Hartley; William Motzing; Richard O'Brien
- Production company: Seven Keys
- Distributed by: Seven Keys
- Release date: 11 June 1983
- Running time: 101 minutes
- Country: Australia
- Language: English
- Budget: A$7 million
- Box office: AU$55,110 (Australia)

The Return of Captain Invincible is a 1983 Australian superhero musical comedy film directed by Philippe Mora, and starring Alan Arkin and Christopher Lee. It was a box office disappointment on release but has become a cult film since then.

== Plot ==
The plot involves the superhero called Captain Invincible (also known as the 'Legend in Leotards', 'Caped Contender' and 'Man of Magnet') who is active during Prohibition, The Depression, World War II, and the early 1950s.

Once a popular hero to all Americans, the super-strong costumed crimefighter is forced into retirement by McCarthy-style government persecution in 1953.

A congressional investigation accuses the patriotic Captain Invincible of being a communist, citing his red cape and 'premature anti-fascism'. He is charged with violating U.S. airspace by flying without a proper licence, impersonating a military officer and wearing underwear in public.

Angry at this bitter betrayal by the country he had fought to protect, he disappears from the public eye, moving to Australia and becoming a hopeless alcoholic.

Thirty years later, Captain Invincible's old nemesis, the sinister super-villain Mr. Midnight, re-emerges and steals a secret government super-weapon: the hypno-ray.

Tracking the former champion of justice down with the help of Sydney police detective Patty Patria, the US government asks Captain Invincible to return, and the story follows his attempts to return to super-heroing and redeem his reputation.

All he has to do is remember how to fly, regain control of his malfunctioning magnetic powers, and most importantly stay sober, his alcoholism now a kryptonite-style weakness his fiendish foe is all too willing to exploit.

== Cast ==
- Alan Arkin as Captain Invincible, US superhero who fought for the Allies during WWII, but fell on hard times.
- Christopher Lee as Mr Midnight, Captain Invincible's archenemy and the evil mastermind behind a massive real estate scam that is actually an international conspiracy to eradicate the ethnic minorities of New York.
- Kate Fitzpatrick as Patty Patria, Australian police detective who helps Captain Invincible get back to his former glory.
- Bill Hunter as Tupper / Coach
- Michael Pate as the US president, who as a child met Captain Invincible who left a life-long impression on him.
- Doug McGrath as Adolf Hitler
- Graham Kennedy as Australian Prime Minister
- Max Phipps as Admiral
- Alfred Sandor as New York Police Captain
- Ron Becks as Black Salesman
- Garth Meade as Polish Salesman
- David Argue as Italian Salesman
- Chelsea Brown as Tour Guide
- Henri Szeps as Chief Security Officer
- Tiriel Mora as Graffiti Artist
- Gus Mercurio as Noisy Garbageman
- Kate Smith as herself

== Production ==
The Return of Captain Invincible was directed by Philippe Mora, and produced by Seven Keys Production and Willara and distributed by Seven Keys in Australia. It was scheduled for release in the US by Jensen Farley Pictures, but the company went out of business days before the scheduled national opening; it was later offered on American VHS and laserdisc by Magnum Entertainment. A widescreen DVD later followed from Elite Entertainment Inc.

Lyricist Richard O'Brien and composer Richard Hartley, known for their prior collaboration on The Rocky Horror Show and its subsequent film adaptation, contributed three songs, including "Captain Invincible", "Evil Midnight" and "Name Your Poison".

After completion, producer Andrew Gaty, acting on the advice of his American distributor, recut. Mora objected and the matter wound up before the Minister of Home Affairs, Tom McVeigh, who declared that the film was not "Australian" and thus did not qualify for the 150% tax deduction available for investors. Gaty challenged this decision in court and won.

=== Music ===
The Return of Captain Invincible
No.	Title	Writer(s)	Performer	Length
1.	"Captain Invincible"	Richard O'Brien, Richard Hartley	Richard O'Brien	2:59
2.	"Name Your Poison"	Richard O'Brien, Richard Hartley	Christopher Lee	3:37
3.	"Mr Evil Midnight"	Richard O'Brien, Richard Hartley	Alan Arkin and Christopher Lee	3:44
4.	"Into the Blue"	Brad Love	Alan Arkin
5.	"We Need a Hero"	Brad Love	Michael Pate	1:49
6.	"Bullshit"	Brad Love	Michael Pate	0:31
7.	"The World I Knew"	Billy Field, Tom Price	Alan Arkin
8.	"Amazing How They're Alike"	Jan Bunker, Mike Scarpiollo	Alan Arkin	2:16
9.	"Heaven in Your Eyes"	Beth Lawrence, Norman Thalheimer	Beth Lawrence

== Reception ==
The Return of Captain Invincible grossed a mere $55,110 at the Australian box office against a budget of $7 million.

British fantasy novelist Terry Pratchett called the film "a series of bad moments pasted together with great songs and a budget of fourpence," but said that he had watched it a number of times. Colin Greenland reviewed The Return of Captain Invincible for Imagine magazine, and stated that "Featuring hilarious musical routines from the man who wrote The Rocky Horror Picture Show and tongue-in-cheek aerobatics by the effects team from Superman, this eccentric, extraordinary and utterly delightful Australian movie has been unforgivably denied to British audiences until now. All credit to Entertainment in Video for discovering it."

=== Accolades ===
Award	Category	Subject	Result
Australian Film Institute Awards	Best Production Design	David Copping	Nominated
Avoriaz International Fantastic Film Festival	Grand Prize	Philippe Mora	Nominated
Sitges Film Festival	Caixa de Catalunya for Best Special Effects	Bob McCarron	Won
