= Australian Idol season 2 =

Australian Idol
- Season 2
- Hosted by: Andrew G James Mathison
- Judges: Ian "Dicko" Dickson; Marcia Hines; Mark Holden
- Winner: Casey Donovan
- Runner-up: Anthony Callea
- Finals venue: Sydney Opera House

Release
- Original network: Network Ten
- Original release: 13 July – 21 November 2004

Season chronology
- ← Previous; Season 1 Next → Season 3

- Australian Idol (season 2)
- Contestants (with dates of elimination)
Casey Donovan	Winner
Anthony Callea	Runner-up
Courtney Murphy	8 November
Hayley Jensen	1 November
Chanel Cole	25 October
Marty Worrall	18 October
Ricki-Lee Coulter	11 October
Daniel Belle	4 October
Emelia Rusciano	27 September
Amali Ward	20 September
Dan O'Connor	13 September
Angie Narayan	7 September

The second season of Australian Idol debuted on 13 July 2004. Over 50,000 people throughout Australia auditioned. The finale was the most-watched television program in Australia in 2004, attracting 3.3 million viewers.

== Overview ==
As well as the five larger cities, the judges also visited Canberra, Hobart, Darwin and Tamworth this year. Of the twelve finalists, three were from Sydney, two were from Melbourne, and one each from Brisbane, the Gold Coast, Hobart, Perth, Canberra, Adelaide and Bega.

The winner was Casey Donovan. Runner-up Anthony Callea, Courtney Murphy (3rd), Hayley Jensen (4th) and Chanel Cole (5th). The final 2, as well as Ricki-Lee Coulter (7th), were the only contestants of the Top 12 to score hits, with Callea ending up the highest seller with his first release of "The Prayer" being named the second highest selling song of the last decade by ARIA in January 2009. Chanel Cole and Daniel Belle teamed up under the label Spook to release an album in October 2005, and a bootleg album for Chanel was also released in November 2005. Ngaiire Joseph (Top 30 contestant) and Marty Worrall released a single each in late 2005, and Hayley Jensen released an album in September 2007. To this date Anthony Callea is the only Idol contestant to make the top 3 without being in the bottom 2 or 3 throughout the course of the show. For this second series of Idol, the Grand Finale remains the highest rated Idol show in the first five series.

Telstra, a major sponsor of the series, made an embarrassing error when they issued a series of half-page advertisements in major newspapers congratulating Donovan on her victory, with a reference to her website. However, the address was incorrect, leading to a website about gay porn star Casey Donovan, rather than the singer's. The company issued a prompt apology upon realising their mistake.

After the season, judge Ian Dickson left the series, though he would return for Seasons 5 to 7. The 2004 season was also notable for an Asian contestant named "Flynn", who sang the Freestylers song "Push Up" after being found from a terrible audition, in the same vein as William Hung.

== Semi-finals ==
=== Group 1 ===
- Anthony Callea – "Angels" (Robbie Williams)
- Prinnie Stevens – "(You Make Me Feel Like) A Natural Woman" (Aretha Franklin)
- Courtney Murphy – "She Will Be Loved" (Maroon 5)
- Chanel Cole – "Glory Box" (Portishead)
- Laurence Sorbello – "Amazed" (Lonestar)
- Ngaiire Joseph – "No More Drama" (Mary J. Blige)
- Emily George – "Ain't No Sunshine" (Bill Withers)
- Meri Bosenavulagi – "Wind Beneath My Wings" (Bette Midler)
- Ben Eaton – "Freedom! '90" (George Michael)
- Hayley Jensen – "Angel" (Sarah McLachlan)

Advancing to the Top 12: Courtney Murphy, Chanel Cole and Hayley Jensen
Wild Card Contenders: Anthony Callea, Ngaiire Joseph and Emily George

=== Group 2 ===
- Yasmine Dia – "You're Free (To Do What You Want To Do)" (Yomanda)
- Gabriel Cabrera – "Careless Whisper" (George Michael)
- Chloe Skipp – "Turn Me On" (Norah Jones)
- Angie Narayan – "Chain of Fools" (Aretha Franklin)
- Barry Southgate – "Up Where We Belong" (Joe Cocker & Jennifer Warnes)
- Tara Del Borrello – "My Immortal" (Evanescence)
- Adrian Hood – "Burn" (Usher)
- Liza Schulberg – "You Put a Move on My Heart" (Tamia)
- Daniel Belle – "Rock DJ" (Robbie Williams)
- Amali Ward – "Some Kind of Wonderful" (Grand Funk Railroad)

Advancing to the Top 12: Angie Narayan, Daniel Belle and Amali Ward
Wild Card Contenders: Tara Del Borrello, Adrian Hood and Liza Schulberg

=== Group 3 ===
- Nicole Wheatley – "I Don't Want to Miss a Thing" (Aerosmith)
- Garth Ploog – "Something Beautiful" (Robbie Williams)
- Christie Green – "Anytime You Need a Friend" (Mariah Carey)
- Ricki-Lee Coulter – "Can't Get Enough of Your Love, Babe" (Barry White)
- Carlos Velazquez – "Yesterday" (The Beatles)
- Emelia Rusciano – "Good Luck" (Basement Jaxx)
- Casey Donovan – "Here's Where I Stand" (Tiffany Taylor)
- Marty Worrall – "Drops of Jupiter" (Train)
- Billie McCarthy – "Stormy Weather" (Billie Holiday)
- Dan O'Connor – "Amazing" (Josh Kelley)

Advancing to the Top 12: Ricki-Lee Coulter, Casey Donovan and Dan O'Connor
Wild Card Contenders: Garth Ploog, Carlos Velazquez, Emelia Rusciano, Marty Worrall

=== Wildcards ===
- Adrian Hood – "The Way You Make Me Feel" (Michael Jackson)
- Emily George – "Killing Me Softly" (The Fugees)
- Garth Ploog – "Harder to Breathe" (Maroon 5)
- Emelia Rusciano – "If I Ain't Got You" (Alicia Keys)
- Ngaiire Joseph – "Don't Let It End" (John Farnham)
- Carlos Velazquez – "Señorita" (Justin Timberlake)
- Tara Del Borrello – "I Turn to You" (Christina Aguilera)
- Anthony Callea – "The Reason" (Hoobastank)
- Liza Schulberg – "Do I Do" (Stevie Wonder)
- Marty Worrall – "Somewhere Only We Know" (Keane)

Advancing to the Top 12: Anthony Callea, Emelia Rusciano and Marty Worrall

== Weekly Song Themes ==
Date	Week	Theme
5 September	Top 12	Australian Made
12 September	Top 11	Pop
19 September	Top 10	The '60s
26 September	Top 9	Disco
3 October	Top 8	Contestant's Choice
10 October	Top 7	Beatles
17 October	Top 6	The '80s
24 October	Top 5	RnB-Soul
31 October	Top 4	Big Band
7 November	Top 3	The '70s

=== Top 12 – Australian Made ===
Order	Contestant	Song	Result
1	Chanel Cole	"Green Limousine" (The Badloves)	Safe
2	Daniel Belle	"You Were There" (Southern Sons)	Safe
3	Amali Ward	"Emotion" (Samantha Sang)	Bottom 3
4	Ricki-Lee Coulter	"Hopelessly Devoted to You" (Olivia Newton-John)	Safe
5	Marty Worrall	"When Something Is Wrong with My Baby" (Jimmy Barnes)	Safe
6	Casey Donovan	"Symphony of Life" (Tina Arena)	Safe
7	Angie Narayan	"A Touch of Paradise" (John Farnham)	Eliminated
8	Anthony Callea	"Heaven Knows" (Rick Price)	Safe
9	Emelia Rusciano	"Just The Thing" (Paul Mac)	Bottom 2
10	Dan O'Connor	"Better" (The Screaming Jets)	Safe
11	Hayley Jensen	"Weir" (Killing Heidi)	Safe
12	Courtney Murphy	"You Weren't In Love With Me" (Billy Field)	Safe

== The Top 12 Contestants ==
=== Casey Donovan ===
Casey Donovan finished in first place for the second series of Australian Idol. She blew the judges and her fans away with powerful renditions of songs such as "Symphony of Life" and "The Special Ones". She came close to elimination twice when she landed in the bottom two during the Top 6 and the Top 4, thus making her the only winner of Australian Idol to date that has enden up in the bottom group on more than one occasion. All other winners were in the bottom group only once, or not at all. She scored four of Mark Holden's touchdowns during the Top 30, the Top 8, the Top 5 and the Top 3. Casey and season 4 winner Damien Leith hold the record for the most touchdowns at four apiece. After Australian Idol Casey was signed to Sony BMG and she released a number one single and released a platinum selling album. She is no longer with Sony BMG but released an EP independently in 2007 and plans to release an independent album in the near future.

Audition: "A Million Tears" (Kasey Chambers)
Theatre Week (Round 1):
Theatre Week (Round 3): "Exodus" (Evanescence)
Top 30: "Here's Where I Stand" (Tiffany Taylor) TOUCHDOWN
Top 12: "Symphony of Life" (Tina Arena)
Top 11: "Don't Speak" (No Doubt)
Top 10: "Somebody to Love" (Jefferson Airplane)
Top 9: "Shake Your Groove Thing" (Peaches & Herb)
Top 8: "Special Ones" (George) TOUCHDOWN
Top 7: "Eleanor Rigby" (The Beatles)
Top 6: "The Flame" (Cheap Trick) Bottom 2
Top 5: "Beautiful" (India.Arie) TOUCHDOWN
Top 4: "Why Don't You Do Right?" (Peggy Lee), "Come Fly with Me" (Frank Sinatra) Bottom 2
Top 3: "You're So Vain" (Carly Simon), "Misty Blue" (Dorothy Moore) TOUCHDOWN
Top 2: "Take Me as I Am (Vanessa Amorosi), "Hello" (Evanescence), "Listen with Your Heart" (winner's single)

=== Anthony Callea ===
Anthony auditioned and was selected for the final 30 in the television series Australian Idol in 2004. Based on viewer votes, he did not make it through the first round of competition but was invited back as a "Judge's Choice Wildcard", where his performance earned him a place in the top 12.

Over the weeks of the competition his popularity with the Australian public grew. During his run on the show, he gave several performances that earned him high praise from the judges, including Simon & Garfunkel's "Bridge over Troubled Water", Foreigner's "I Want to Know What Love Is" and Andrea Bocelli and Céline Dion's duet "The Prayer." Judge Ian 'Dicko' Dickson said Callea's performance of the latter was the finest he had seen during his two years with the show and rendered him speechless. Mark Holden invented a new concept of the 'Grand Royale' Touchdown for his fine performance. This, to date, remains the only 'Grand Royale' Touchdown given out by Mark Holden.

Audition: "Wishes" (Human Nature)
Theatre Week (Round 1):
Theatre Week (Round 3):
Top 30: "Angels" (Robbie Williams)
Wildcards: "The Reason" (Hoobastank)
Top 12: "Heaven Knows" (Rick Price)
Top 11: "Ignition" (R. Kelly)
Top 10: "Gimme Some Lovin'" (Spencer Davis Group)
Top 9: "Car Wash" (Rose Royce)
Top 8: "The Prayer" (Andrea Bocelli and Céline Dion) TOUCHDOWN
Top 7: "I Saw Her Standing There" (The Beatles)
Top 6: "I Want to Know What Love Is" (Foreigner)
Top 5: "Back at One" (Brian McKnight)
Top 4: "Fever" (Peggy Lee), "(Get Your Kicks On) Route 66" (Nat King Cole)
Top 3: "Hold the Line" (Toto), "Bridge over Troubled Water" (Simon & Garfunkel) TOUCHDOWN
Top 2: "Listen with Your Heart" (winner's single), "Walking Away" (Craig David), "Glory of Love" (Peter Cetera)

=== Courtney Murphy ===
Courtney Murphy (born 20 November 1979 in Perth, Western Australia) was eliminated on 8 November 2004, making it to the top three.

Audition: "The Rescue Blues" (Ryan Adams)
Theatre Week (Round 1):
Theatre Week (Round 3):
Top 30: "She Will Be Loved" (Maroon 5)
Top 12: "You Weren't in Love with Me" (Billy Field)
Top 11: "No Matter What" (Badfinger)
Top 10: "Spinning Wheel" (Blood, Sweat & Tears)
Top 9: "Everyone's a Winner" (Hot Chocolate)
Top 8: "God Only Knows" (The Beach Boys)
Top 7: "Got to Get You into My Life" (The Beatles)
Top 6: "Oh Sherrie" (Steve Perry)
Top 5: "What a Fool Believes" (The Doobie Brothers) Bottom 2
Top 4: "For Once in My Life" (Frank Sinatra), "Don't Get Around Much Anymore" (Louis Armstrong & Duke Ellington) ~ TOUCHDOWN
Top 3: "Somebody to Love" (Queen) ~ TOUCHDOWN, "My Love" (Paul McCartney) Eliminated

Murphy played the parts of "Roger" a "T'Bird" in the Grease Arena Spectacular which toured Australia from May until June 2005. He has released a CD in the group "Murphy's Lore" with his brothers.

Murphy appeared as a guest on ABC's "Spicks and Specks" in 2005 and briefly revisited his performance of Billy Field's "You Weren't In Love With Me", causing co-host Myf Warhurst to become visibly emotional. Murphy's performance of the song is credited in Billy Field's 2005 released Best Of compilation as the impetus for a significant increase in interest in the back catalog of Billy Field.

Murphy performed the Australian National Anthem "Advance Australia Fair" before the test match held between Australia and India at the WACA Ground in Perth, Western Australia on 16 January 2008.

Recording and mixing of Murphy's debut album "Big" was completed in September 2009. Mastering by Sterling Sound, NYC to be completed October 2009. The full-length album is set for independent release in January 2010, and features production, performance and mixing contributions from LA-based power pop artist Bleu.

Courtney's brother, Chris Murphy, later competed in the fourth season of Australian Idol, where he was placed fourth.

=== Hayley Jensen ===
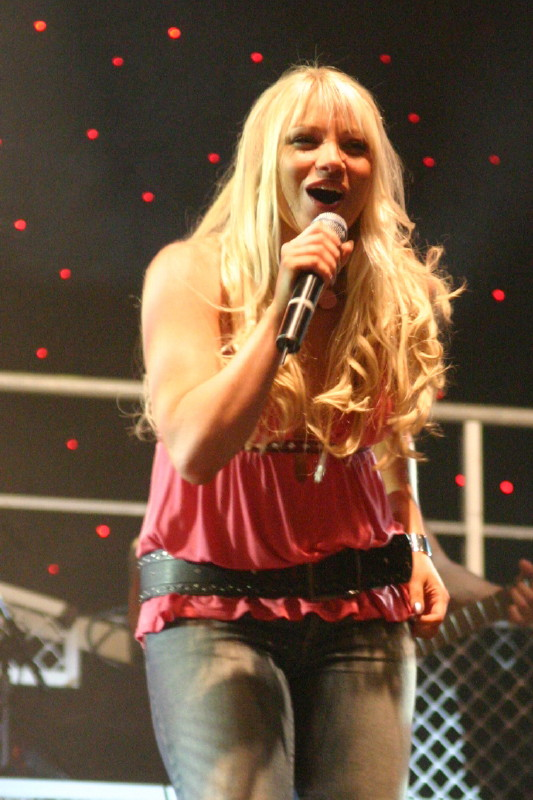
Hayley Jenesen

Hayley Jensen (born 7 January 1983, in Canberra, ACT), was eliminated on 1 November 2004, placed fourth. Like Marty Worrall, she was placed in the bottom 3 five times including elimination.

Audition:
Theatre Week (Round 1):
Theatre Week (Round 3):
Top 30: "Angel" (Sarah McLachlan)
Top 12: "Weir" (Killing Heidi)
Top 11: "Left Outside Alone" (Anastacia) Bottom 2
Top 10: "To Sir, With Love" (Lulu) Bottom 2
Top 9: "If I Can't Have You" (Yvonne Elliman)
Top 8: "Release" (George) Bottom 3
Top 7: "Yesterday" (The Beatles)
Top 6: "I Feel the Earth Move" (Martika) Bottom 3
Top 5: "Ain't No Mountain High Enough" (Marvin Gaye & Tammi Terrell)
Top 4: "It Had to Be You" (Frank Sinatra), "Nature Boy" (Nat King Cole) Eliminated

=== Chanel Cole ===
Chanel Cole (born 13 November 1977 in Hamilton, New Zealand) was eliminated on 25 October 2004, placed fifth.

Audition: "When I Get Low, I Get High" (Ella Fitzgerald)
Theatre Week (Round 1): "Alcoba Azul" (Lila Downs)
Theatre Week (Round 3): "Pretty Boy" (Roy Orbison)
Top 30: "Glory Box" (Portishead)
Top 12: "Green Limousine" (The Badloves)
Top 11: "History Repeating" (Propellerheads / Shirley Bassey)
Top 10: "Walk On By" (Dionne Warwick)
Top 9: "Never Can Say Goodbye" (The Jackson 5 / Gloria Gaynor)
Top 8: "Constant Craving" (k.d. lang) Bottom 2
Top 7: "Across the Universe" (The Beatles) Bottom 2
Top 6: "Stop!" (Sam Brown)
Top 5: "Hit 'em Up Style (Oops!)" (Blu Cantrell) Eliminated

=== Marty Worrall ===
Marty Worrall (born 8 February 1978, in Kerang, Victoria), was eliminated on 18 October 2004, placed sixth. He was placed in the bottom group 5 times, including elimination.

Audition: "I Believe in a Thing Called Love" (The Darkness)
Theatre Week (Round 1):
Theatre Week (Round 3):
Top 30: "Drops of Jupiter (Tell Me)" (Train)
Wildcards: "Somewhere Only We Know" (Keane)
Top 12: "When Something Is Wrong with My Baby" (Jimmy Barnes)
Top 11: "The Remedy (I Won't Worry)" (Jason Mraz) Bottom 3
Top 10: "(I Can't Get No) Satisfaction" (The Rolling Stones) Bottom 3
Top 9: "More Than A Woman" (Bee Gees) Bottom 2
Top 8: "Broken Wings" (Mr. Mister)
Top 7: "Oh! Darling" (The Beatles) Bottom 3
Top 6: "The Power Of Love" (Huey Lewis and the News) Eliminated

(Australia)

=== Ricki-Lee Coulter ===
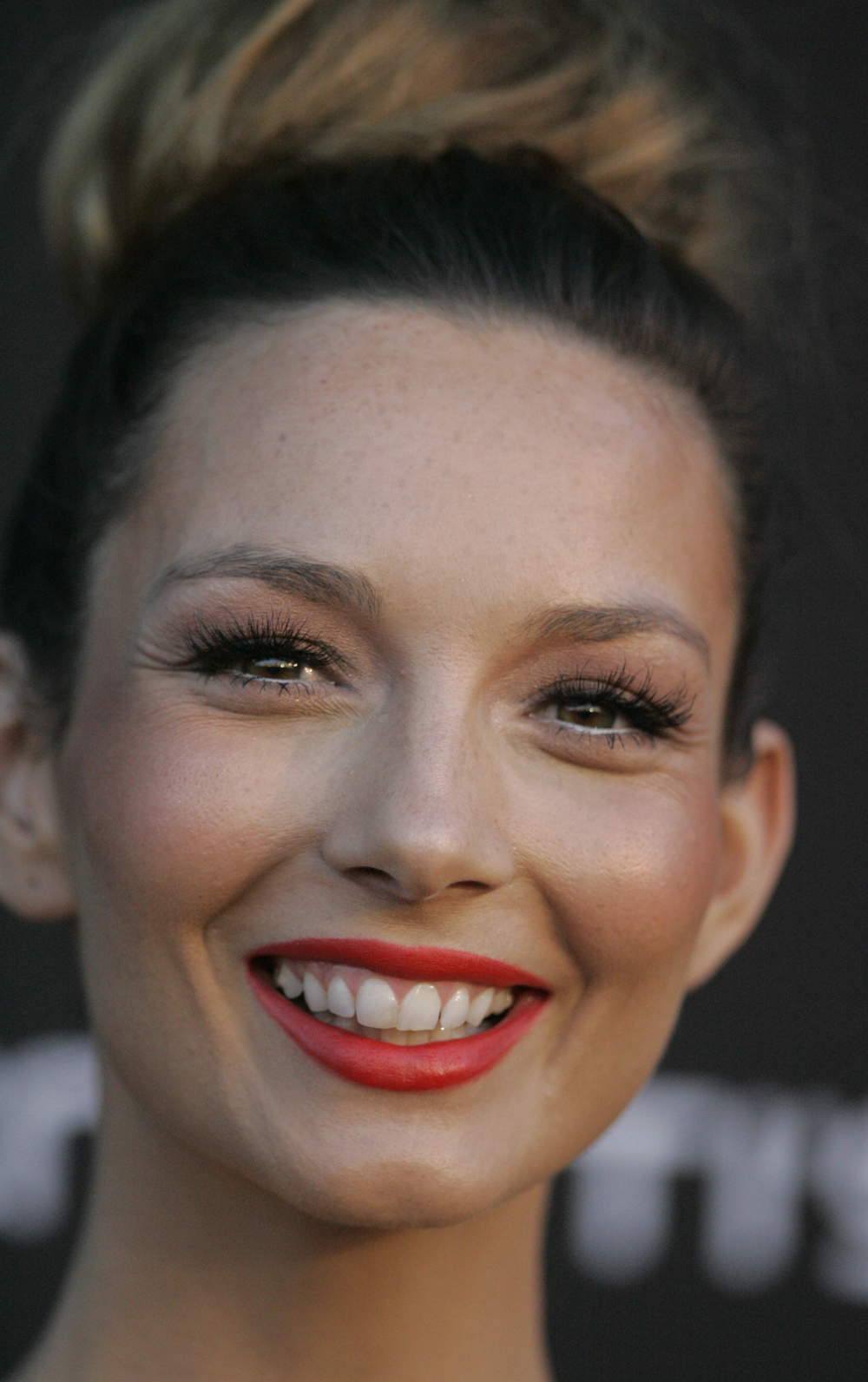
Ricki-Lee Coulter

Ricki-Lee Coulter (born 10 November 1985, in Auckland, New Zealand), was eliminated on 11 October 2004, placed seventh. She had been one of the favourites to win the series from the Top 12 until the Top 7 where she gave a poor performance and was eliminated. Like Daniel Belle, who was eliminated the week before her, Ricki-Lee had never appeared in the Bottom 3 or 2 until her elimination.

Audition: "Don't Let Go" (En Vogue)
Theatre Week (Round 1):
Theatre Week (Round 3):
Top 30: "Can't Get Enough of Your Love, Babe" (Barry White)
Top 12: "Hopelessly Devoted to You" (Olivia Newton-John)
Top 11: "Work It Out" (Beyoncé)
Top 10: "Proud Mary" (Tina Turner)
Top 9: "Don't Stop 'til You Get Enough" (Michael Jackson)
Top 8: "I Have Nothing" (Whitney Houston)
Top 7: "We Can Work It Out" (The Beatles) Eliminated

=== Daniel Belle ===
Daniel Belle (born 20 May 1983, in Sydney, New South Wales) was the fifth contestant to be voted out of the competition, on 4 October 2004.

Daniel was never in the bottom three until his elimination week.

Audition: "Thank You" (Boyz II Men)
Theatre Week (Round 1):
Theatre Week (Round 3):
Top 30: "Rock DJ" (Robbie Williams)
Top 12: "You Were There" (Southern Sons)
Top 11: "You Raise Me Up" (Josh Groban)
Top 10: "He Ain't Heavy, He's My Brother" (The Hollies / Neil Diamond)
Top 9: "Working My Way Back to You" (The Spinners)
Top 8: "Your Song" (Elton John) Eliminated

=== Em Rusciano ===
Emelia "Em" Rusciano (born 1980, in Melbourne, Victoria) was placed ninth, being eliminated on 27 September 2004. She gave an outstanding performance of Alicia Keys' "If I Ain't Got You" on the wild card show, resulting in her being the judges choice to join the Top 12.

Audition:
Theatre Week (Round 1):
Theatre Week (Round 3):
Top 30: "Good Luck" (Basement Jaxx)
Wildcards: "If I Ain't Got You" (Alicia Keys)
Top 12: "Just the Thing" (Peter Morris) Bottom 2
Top 11: "Family Portrait" (Pink)
Top 10: "Anyone Who Had a Heart" (Dionne Warwick)
Top 9: "Turn the Beat Around" (Vicki Sue Robinson) Eliminated

Em joined Mark Trevorrow (Bob Downe) for the Adelaide Cabaret festival in late 2004 for his highly acclaimed I-Bob show and received rave reviews for her performance. She then went on to work for SAFM filling in for the "Milly and Lehmo show" and doing a number of live performances around Adelaide. Emelia impressed Austereo bosses so much that she was offered a full-time breakfast hosting role in Western Australia. In 2006, she participated in the quiz show Australia's Brainiest Idol.

Em went on to host breakfast radio for the Austereo network in Perth for 4 1/2 years. Her first co-host was Michael "Wippa" Wipfli from 2006 to 2008 after Wippa left to host drive for Nova FM in Melbourne Sam Mac moved to Perth to co-host the show, Em was fired in 2009. While in Perth Em also guest starred in "Hair the tribal rock musical" alongside Idol alumni Cosima De Vito and Rob Mills.

Em Rusciano is married to Scott Barrow and has two daughters Marchella (b. 2001) and Odette (b. 2007), and one son, Elio (b. 2019). She lives in Melbourne.

Rusciano has appeared on All Star Family Feud, The Circle, The Project, Studio 10 and Hughesy, We Have a Problem.

In 2009, Rusciano left the 92.9 breakfast show in Perth after four years and returned to Melbourne. From August 2012 to May 2013, she co-hosted the radio show Mamamia Today with Dave Thornton on the Today Network.

In January 2016, Rusciano toured Australia with her stand-up comedy show, Em Rusciano Is Not a Diva.

In June 2016, Rusciano joined the Hit Network to host The Em Rusciano Show on Sunday nights.

Rusciano published her memoir Try Hard: Tales from the Life of a Needy Overachiever on 26 October 2016.

In January 2017, Rusciano was announced as one of two hosts for 2Day FM's new breakfast show.

In September 2018 Rusciano announced she was leaving the show, stating she decided to leave due to her pregnancy. Rusciano admitted her time at 2Day FM was a "mixed bag".

In April 2020 Em started a very popular podcast called Emsolation which she hosts with her best friend, screenwriter, Michael Lucas. The podcast won second place in the people's choice category of the 2021 Australian Podcast Awards.

In 2021, Rusciano appeared on season three of The Masked Singer Australia and finished runner-up as “Dolly”.

=== Amali Ward ===
Amali Ward (born 2 June 1988, in Sydney, New South Wales) was placed tenth in the competition, being eliminated on 20 September 2004. Auditioning in Hobart, Amali was one of only two people chosen from Hobart to progress to the Sydney theatre rounds. Born to an English father and a Sri Lankan mother, and the sole finalist from Tasmania, she was also one of the youngest participants, at 16 years old, attending The Friends' School in Hobart.

Audition: "If I Ain't Got You" (Alicia Keys)
Theatre Week (Round 1): "Some Kind of Wonderful" (Joss Stone)
Theatre Week (Round 3): "Signed, Sealed, Delivered" (Stevie Wonder)
Top 30: "Some Kind of Wonderful" (Joss Stone)
Top 12: "Emotion" (Samantha Sang) Bottom 3
Top 11: "Shackles (Praise You)" (Mary Mary)
Top 10: "I Say a Little Prayer" (Dionne Warwick) Eliminated

After the competition, Amali moved to Sydney and released her debut, self written and produced EP. The Daily Telegraph commented "taking her time has paid off" and Amali won a MusicOZ award that year. Since the release of her EP, Amali has toured Australia playing shows including the East Coast Blues & Roots Music Festival (Byron Bay Blues & Roots Festival), The Southern Roots Festival and 2009 Rosemount Fashion Week for designer Kirrily Johnston. She has supported local artists such as The Bamboos, Paris Wells and True Live and international acts such as Naturally 7, whom she opened for at the Enmore Theatre.

Amali has also done significant co-writing, both locally and internationally, with writers and producers such as Jack Splash (Alicia Keys, Cee-Lo, John Legend), Cristyle (Rihanna, Beyoncé, Mariah Carey) and Warryn Campbell (Kanye West, Mary Mary, Musiq Soulchild). Her song 'Ten Things To Prove' was featured in the Sony Pictures film Center Stage 2: Turn it Up.

Amali has also appeared in television commercials for US department store Mervyns, AAMI, Optus, Commonwealth Bank, Outback Steakhouse, Bonds (company), KFC, Mazda and was chosen as a brand ambassador for Rexona Girl, appearing in a nationwide print and television advertising campaign. In 2011/12, Amali hosted the television series Save Point on One HD, discussing video game releases and gaming news.

April 2012 saw Amali selected as the support act for Seal on his 2012 Australian 'Soul 2' Tour.

In the lead up to the release of her debut album, Amali released several live versions of the songs on her YouTube channel, including the songs 'Handbag', 'Upside Down' and 'Knock You Out', the latter winning the John Lennon Songwriting Contest Lennon Award, in the R&B category.

Amali announced that she recorded her debut album in Los Angeles with producer David Ryan Harris and members of John Mayer's live band, with mixing and mastering by Grammy winner S. Husky Höskulds. October 2012 saw the release of her debut single Leave Me Alone. In February 2013, she released second single Knock You Out. March 2013 saw Amali win the Australasian Performing Right Association (APRA) Stephen Schwartz Songwriting Award as part of APRA's Professional Development Awards.

On 5 May 2013, Amali released her debut album, Back In Time. The Sydney Morning Herald described Amali as a "soulful singer with a Motown heart on her sleeve." In June 2013, Amali supported David Ryan Harris on his Australian club tour dates and completed an Australian east coast tour to promote the album.

In September 2013 it was announced that Amali would guest star on 3 episodes of long running Australian soap opera Neighbours, appearing as herself in a storyline with character Paul Robinson, played by Stefan Dennis.

=== Dan O'Connor ===
Daniel "Dan" O'Connor (born 23 October 1978, in Sydney, New South Wales), was eliminated on 13 October 2004, placed eleventh.

Audition: "I Surrender All" (written by Judson W. Van DeVenter)
Theatre Week (Round 1):
Theatre Week (Round 3):
Top 30: "Amazing" (Josh Kelley)
Top 12: "Better" (The Screaming Jets)
Top 11: "Higher" (Creed) Eliminated

=== Angeline Narayan ===
Angeline (Angie) Narayan (aged 26, from Brisbane, Queensland) was placed twelfth in the contest. Auditioning for Australian Idol in the Gold Coast, she performed Disco Inferno by The Trammps which blew the judges away with her soulful, R&B voice. In the semi-finals, she performed Aretha Franklin's Chain of Fools and the judges said it was the best performance of that night and she was the first contestant from her group voted through to the top 12 the next night. At the first top 12 live show, she performed A Touch of Paradise by John Farnham, which left the judges a bit disappointed by her performance. Angie told them that she has been suffering from the flu. She was eliminated the next night. Angie, like Dan O'Conner, was not featured on the season 2 contestant's cast album. Why only the Top 10 were featured on the album is unknown.

Audition: "Disco Inferno" (The Trammps)
Theatre Week (Round 1):
Theatre Week (Round 3):
Top 30: "Chain of Fools" (Aretha Franklin)
Top 12: "A Touch of Paradise" (John Farnham) Eliminated

Since her elimination, Narayan has released several demo singles and written many new songs, and has produced an album named 'Undeniable' through an independent record label called 'Locus Records', in which she covered Aretha Franklins' "Chain Of Fools".

== Elimination chart ==
Females	Males	Top 30	Top 12	Wild Card	Winner

Did Not Perform	Safe	Safe First	Safe Last	Eliminated

Stage:		Semi-Finals			Wild Card	Finals										
Week:		9/8	16/8	23/8	30/8	6/9	13/9	20/9	27/9	4/10	11/10	18/10	25/10	1/11	8/11	21/11
Place	Contestant	Result														
1	Casey Donovan			Top 12					Bottom 3			Bottom 2		Bottom 2		Winner
2	Anthony Callea	Wild Card			Top 12											Runner-up
3	Courtney Murphy	Top 12											Bottom 2		Elim	
4	Hayley Jensen	Top 12					Bottom 2	Bottom 2		Bottom 3		Bottom 3		Elim		
5	Chanel Cole	Top 12								Bottom 2	Bottom 2		Elim			
6	Marty Worrall			Wild Card	Top 12		Bottom 3	Bottom 3	Bottom 2		Bottom 3	Elim				
7	Ricki-Lee Coulter			Top 12							Elim					
8	Daniel Belle		Top 12							Elim						
9	Emelia Rusciano			Wild Card	Top 12	Bottom 2			Elim							
10	Amali Ward		Top 12			Bottom 3		Elim								
11	Dan O'Connor			Top 12			Elim									
12	Angie Narayan		Top 12			Elim										
Wild Card	Tara Del Borrello		Wild Card		Elim											
Wild Card	Emily George	Wild Card			Elim											
Wild Card	Adrian Hood		Wild Card		Elim											
Wild Card	Ngaiire Joseph	Wild Card			Elim											
Wild Card	Garth Ploog			Wild Card	Elim											
Wild Card	Liza Schulberg		Wild Card		Elim											
Wild Card	Carlos Velazquez			Wild Card	Elim											
Semi-Final 3	Christie Green			Elim												
Semi-Final 3	Billie McCarthy			Elim												
Semi-Final 3	Nicole Wheatley			Elim												
Semi-Final 2	Gabriel Cabrera		Elim													
Semi-Final 2	Yasmine Dia		Elim													
Semi-Final 2	Chloe Skipp		Elim													
Semi-Final 2	Barry Southgate		Elim													
Semi-Final 1	Meri Bosenavulagi	Elim														
Semi-Final 1	Ben Eaton	Elim														
Semi-Final 1	Laurence Sorbello	Elim														
Semi-Final 1	Prinnie Stevens	Elim														

Preceded by Season 1 (2003)	Australian Idol; Season 2 (2004)	Succeeded by Season 3 (2005)
