= Let It Out =

Let It Out may refer to:

== Albums and DVDs ==
- Let It Out (Kraan album) or the title song, 1975
- Let It Out, an album by Ashlyne Huff, 2011
- Let It Out (Let It All Hang Out), an album by the Hombres, or the title song (see below), 1967
- Let It Out, a DVD by Hoobastank, 2004

== Songs ==
- "Let It Out" (Miho Fukuhara song), 2009
- "Let It Out" (Switchfoot song), 2014
- "Let It Out (Let It All Hang Out)", by the Hombres, 1967; covered by Jonathan King, 1970
- "Let It Out", by Frances from Things I've Never Said, 2017
- "Let It Out", by George Canyon from What I Do, 2008
- "Let It Out", by Godsmack from When Legends Rise, 2018
- "Let It Out", by Hoobstank from The Reason, 2003
- "Let It Out", by In Fear and Faith from Imperial, 2010

== Other uses ==
- "Let It Out" (Miranda), also known as "Excuse", a 2009 television episode
