= APRA Music Awards of 1985 =

Annual Australian music awards

- Date: 1985
- Website: apra-amcos.com.au

The Australasian Performing Right Association Awards of 1985 (generally known as APRA Awards) are a series of awards held in 1985. The APRA Music Awards were presented by Australasian Performing Right Association (APRA) and the Australasian Mechanical Copyright Owners Society (AMCOS).

== Awards ==
Only winners are noted

Award	Winner
Special Award	"Down Under" (Colin Hay, Ron Strykert) by Men at Work
Special Award	Corroboree (John Antill) by National Theatre Ballet
Special Award	"The Other Guy" (Graham Goble) by Little River Band
Special Award	"Our Love Is on the Faultline" (Reece Kirk) by Crystal Gayle
Most Performed Australasian Music for Film	Phar Lap (Bruce Rowland) by Bruce Rowland
Most Performed Australasian Country Work	"Give Me a Home Among the Gumtrees" (Robert Brown, Walter Johnson) by Captain Rock, Bullamakanka
Most Performed Australasian Popular Work	"Come Said the Boy" (Eric McCusker) by Mondo Rock
Most Performed Australasian Serious Work	Piano Concerto (Peter Sculthorpe)
Most Performed Australasian Jazz Work	"One Moment" (Judy Bailey) by Judy Bailey
Most Performed Overseas Work	"Islands in the Stream" (Barry Gibb, Maurice Gibb, Robin Gibb) by Kenny Rogers and Dolly Parton

== See also ==
- Music of Australia
