= APRA Music Awards of 1982 =

Annual Australian music awards

- Date: 1984
- Website: apra-amcos.com.au

The Australasian Performing Right Association Awards of 1982 (generally known as APRA Awards) are a series of awards held in 1982. The inaugural APRA Music Awards were presented by Australasian Performing Right Association (APRA) and the Australasian Mechanical Copyright Owners Society (AMCOS). There were no awards presented in 1983: while the next ceremony occurred in 1984.

== Awards ==
Only winners are noted

Award	Winner
Gold Award	"Reminiscing" (Graham Goble) by Little River Band
Gold Award	"Lost in Love" (Graham Russell) by Air Supply
Gold Award	"Cool Change" (Glenn Shorrock) by Little River Band
Gold Award	"Love Is in the Air" (Harry Vanda, George Young) by John Paul Young (no relation)
Gold Award	Highway to Hell" (Angus Young, Malcolm Young, Bon Scott) by AC/DC
Most Performed Australasian Country Work	"G'day Blue" (Ron Ellis) by Slim Dusty
Most Performed Australasian Popular Work	"You Weren't in Love with Me" (Billy Field) by Billy Field
Most Performed Australasian Serious Work	Corroboree (John Antill) by National Theatre Ballet
Most Performed Foreign Work	"Arthur's Theme (Best That You Can Do)" (Christopher Cross, Burt Bacharach, Carole Bayer Sager, Peter Allen) by Christopher Cross

== See also ==
- Music of Australia
