= Greatest Hits: The Deluxe Edition =

Greatest Hits/The Deluxe Edition

Compilation album by David Lee Roth
- Released: November 19, 2013
- Recorded: 1984–1994
- Genre: Hard rock
- Length: 58:36
- Label: Friday Music
- Producer: Various

David Lee Roth chronology
Diamond Dave (2003)	Greatest Hits/The Deluxe Edition (2013)

Professional ratings
Review scores
Source	Rating
AllMusic	4/5 stars

Greatest Hits/The Deluxe Edition is a greatest hits album by American rock singer David Lee Roth, compiling his solo work from 1985 to 1994.

== Track listings ==
=== CD ===
No.	Title	Writer(s)	Original release	Length
1.	"California Girls"	Brian Wilson	Crazy from the Heat	2:54
2.	"Just a Gigolo/I Ain't Got Nobody"	Leonello Casucci, Irving Caesar / Spencer Williams, Roger Graham	Crazy from the Heat	4:44
3.	"Easy Street"	Dan Hartman	Crazy from the Heat	3:51
4.	"Coconut Grove"	John Sebastian, Zal Yanovsky	Crazy from the Heat	2:53
5.	"Just Like Paradise"	David Lee Roth, Brett Tuggle	Skyscraper	4:07
6.	"A Little Luck"	David Lee Roth, Eddie Anderson, Steve Hunter,	Your Filthy Little Mouth	4:41
7.	"I'm Easy"	Billy Field, Tom Price	Eat 'Em and Smile	2:10
8.	"Tobacco Road"	John D. Loudermilk	Eat 'Em and Smile	2:30
9.	"Goin' Crazy!"	David Lee Roth, Steve Vai	Eat 'Em and Smile	3:11
10.	"Yankee Rose"	David Lee Roth, Vai	Eat 'Em and Smile	3:53
11.	"A Lil' Ain't Enough"	David Lee Roth, Robbie Nevil	A Little Ain't Enough	4:45
12.	"Sensible Shoes"	David Lee Roth, Dennis Morgan, Sturges,	A Little Ain't Enough	5:10
13.	"Hey, You Never Know"	David Lee Roth, Terry Kilgore	Your Filthy Little Mouth	2:46
14.	"Hot Dog and a Shake"	David Lee Roth, Vai	Skyscraper	3:20
15.	"Land's Edge"	David Lee Roth, Kilgore	Your Filthy Little Mouth	3:12
16.	"No Big 'Ting"	David Lee Roth, Kilgore	Your Filthy Little Mouth	4:53
Total length:				58:36

=== DVD ===
No.	Title	Director	Length
1.	"Just a Gigolo/I Ain't Got Nobody"	Pete Angelus, David Lee Roth	6:15
2.	"California Girls"	Angelus, Roth	4:30
3.	"Yankee Rose"	Angelus, Roth	5:21
4.	"Goin' Crazy!"	Angelus, Roth	5:56
5.	"Sensible Shoes"	Matt Mahurin	4:28
6.	"A Lil' Ain't Enough"		5;22
7.	"Night Life"	Roth	3:43
8.	"¡Loco del Calor!"	Angelus, Roth	3:43
9.	"Tell the Truth"	Matt Mahurin	4:28
10.	"Dave TV Interviews"	Angelus, Roth	6:42
Total length:			51:35
