= Almost Honest (album) =

Studio album by Josh Kelley
- Released: August 23, 2005 (US); December 7, 2005 (Japan)
- Genre: Pop rock
- Length: 54:32 (US)
- Label: Hollywood Records
- Producer: Matt Wallace; The Matrix; Joe Firstman; Jim Scott

Josh Kelley chronology
For the Ride Home (2003)	Almost Honest (2005)	Just Say the Word (2006)

Almost Honest
Review scores
Source	Rating
AllMusic	4/5 stars
Entertainment Weekly	B+
PopMatters	6/10 stars

Almost Honest is Josh Kelley's second album, his last album on Hollywood Records. The album peaked at No. 114 on the Billboard 200 albums chart and No. 1 on the Top Heatseekers chart. "Only You" was released as a single.

The title track appears on the Smallville: The Metropolis Mix soundtrack.

== Track listing ==
No.	Title	Writer(s)	Length
1.	"Walk Fast"	Josh Kelley, Darwin Johnson, Dave Yaden	3:20
2.	"Only You"	The Matrix, Kelley	3:11
3.	"Love Is Breaking My Heart"	Kelley, Mike Daly	3:38
4.	"Almost Honest"	Kelley, Joe Firstman	3:19
5.	"Didn't Hear That From Me"	Kelley, Gary Burr	3:28
6.	"20 Miles To Georgia"	Kelley, Firstman	5:17
7.	"Lover Come Up"	Kelley, Kevin Griffin	4:07
8.	"Shameless Heart"	Kelley, Jimmy Harry	5:39
9.	"Too Good To You"	Kelley, Scott Cutler, Anne Preven	4:25
10.	"I Don't Mind Singing"	Kelley, Firstman	3:15
11.	"Hard Times Happen"	Kelley, Yaden	4:28
12.	"Lydia" / "Heartache" (hidden track, starts at 6:02)	Kelley, Johnson, Yaden	12:49

Japan release bonus tracks
No.	Title	Length
13.	"Caroline"
14.	"You Are the Woman"	2:36

iTunes version bonus tracks
No.	Title	Writer(s)	Length
12.	"Lydia"	Kelley, Johnson, Yaden	4:01
13.	"Amazing"	Kelley	3:52
14.	"Heartache"		4:06

"You Are the Woman" is available in the US on the soundtrack to Herbie: Fully Loaded. The hidden track, "Heartache", also appears on the single for "Only You" and is sold separately from "Lydia" on the iTunes version.

== Personnel ==
- Josh Kelley – vocals (1–6, 8–12), acoustic guitar (2, 3, 5–10), percussion (3, 5–9, 11), backing vocals (5, 6, 9, 11), Nashville guitar (6), all vocals (7), electric guitar (7), nylon guitar (11), harmony vocals (12)
- Spencer Albee – clavinet (1), organ (1, 8), Wurlitzer electric piano (6), acoustic piano (8)
- Zac Rae – Wurlitzer electric piano (1, 5), Ace Tone organ (1), Chamberlin (6), organ (6, 11), keyboards (9), clavinet (11)
- Dave Yaden – acoustic piano (1, 5, 6, 11, 12), backing vocals (1, 11), keyboards (3), organ (4), banjo (6), Hammond B3 organ (7), Wurlitzer electric piano (8, 11), sampled keyboard strings (8)
- The Matrix – programming (2)
- Clarence Allen – Hammond B3 organ (3, 10)
- Joe Firstman – acoustic piano (4, 10), backing vocals (4, 10)
- Jacob Luttrell – Wurlitzer electric piano (10)
- Jason "Slim" Gambill – guitars (1), electric guitar (3–7, 9–11), acoustic guitar (4)
- Michael Ward – electric guitar (3, 7, 9)
- Ben Peeler – acoustic 12-string guitar (3), dulcimer (3), 12-string guitar (7), lap steel guitar (7, 9, 11)
- Robert Randolph – pedal steel guitar (6)
- Jimmy Harry – slide guitar (8)
- Darwin Johnson – bass (1, 3–12), backing vocals (1, 3–6, 9, 11)
- Michael Bland – drums (1, 8)
- Michael Miley – drums (3, 4, 7)
- Donald Barrett – drums (5, 6, 9, 11, 12)
- David Goodstein – drums (10)
- Matt Wallace – percussion (3)
- Karl Berger – string arrangements (4, 5)
- Charles Kelley – backing vocals (5, 6)
- Amelia Wallace – backing vocals (11)
- Michael Wallace – backing vocals (11)

=== Production ===
- Eric Clinger – executive producer, A&R
- Matt Wallace – producer (1, 3, 5–9, 11, 12)
- The Matrix – producers (2)
- Joe Firstman – producer (4, 10)
- Rick Parker – producer (4)
- Jim Scott – producer (10)
- Lincoln Wheeler – marketing director
- David Snow – creative director
- Tornado Design – package design
- Debbie Wilson – management

Technical credits

- Brian Gardner – mastering at Bernie Grundman Mastering (Hollywood, California)
- Mike Landolt – engineer (1, 3, 5–9, 11, 12), mixing (5, 8)
- Brian Reeves – mixing (1, 9, 11)
- The Matrix – engineers (2), mixing (2)
- Serban Ghenea – mixing (3, 7)
- Rick Parker – engineer (4)
- Jim Scott – mixing (4, 6, 10), engineer (10)
- Matt Wallace – mixing (8)
- Tony Phillips – mixing (12)
- Paul Figueroa – assistant engineer (1, 3, 5–9, 11, 12)
- Posie Muliadi – additional engineer (1, 3, 5–9, 11, 12)
- Josh Kelley – additional engineer (acoustic guitar and background vocals)

== Charts ==
Chart (2005)	Peak position
US Billboard 200	114
US Heatseekers Albums (Billboard)	1
