= Wambidgee =

Australian television series

- Genre: Children's television
- Created by: Bill Copland
- Written by: Denys Burrows
- Directed by: Bill Copland
- Composer: John Antill
- Country of origin: Australia
- Original language: English
- No. of episodes: 12

Production
- Producer: Bill Copland
- Running time: 7 minutes

Original release
- Network: ABC Television
- Release: 1962

Wambidgee is a 1962 Australian television series featuring Puppetoons. There were 12 episodes, each running 7 minutes.

The idea came from Bill Copland, who produced and directed. Denys Burrows wrote the scripts. Robert Knapp designed the puppetoons. John Antill composed the music.

== Premise ==
The adventures of a young Aboriginal boy living in the bush.
