= William Motzing =

- Born: William Edward Motzing Jr. August 19, 1937; Pittsburgh, Pennsylvania, U.S.
- Died: January 30, 2014 (aged 76) Manhasset, New York, U.S.
- Genres: Film score; contemporary classical music; jazz; popular music
- Occupations: Composer; conductor; arranger; trombonist
- Years active: 1960–2011

William Edward Motzing Jr. (August 19, 1937 – January 30, 2014) was an American composer, conductor, arranger and trombonist best known for the award-winning film and television scores and gold and platinum pop album arrangements he wrote in Australia. He was a jazz lecturer and the Director of Jazz Studies at the Sydney Conservatorium of Music over a period of 40 years.

== Early life and career ==
Born in Pittsburgh, PA, William Motzing attended the Eastman School of Music in Rochester, New York, alongside Ron Carter and Chuck Mangione who would also become notable musicians. He gained his bachelor's degree at Eastman in 1959, and in 1960 a master's degree from the Manhattan School of Music in New York City.

He played trombone in the Eastman School of Music's Rochester Philharmonic Orchestra. He married Bette Anne Loder on April 23, 1960 and became the youngest member of the famous Pittsburgh Symphony Orchestra in October of the same year. After two years he began performing with jazz groups including the Kai Winding Septet, Jon Eardley Quintet, Gerry Mulligan Big Band, Bill Russo Big Band, the Sal Salvador Big Band as well as the Radio City Music Hall orchestra from 1964 to 1971.

From 1968 to 1971, Motzing also toured the world as sound designer for contemporary jazz-rock band Blood, Sweat & Tears through his job with the Clair Brothers (Audio). After visiting Australia with the group in 1971, he relocated there on January 25, 1972, to take positions as lecturer in the jazz program directed by fellow American Howie Smith at the New South Wales State Conservatorium of Music (now Sydney Conservatorium of Music) and later at the Australian Film and Television School.

== Arranging and conducting ==
In the 1970s and 1980s Motzing arranged and conducted strings and horns on many of Australia's chart-topping hits. These include Peter Allen's "I Still Call Australia Home", which was added to the National Film and Sound Archive's Sounds of Australia registry in 2013; Billy Field's "Bad Habits", the title track of Bad Habits (Billy Field album), the largest selling album in Australia in 1981 and for which he received a gold award at the 12th Tokyo Music Festival; Sherbet's "Howzat", reaching the top 5 of the UK charts and also entering the US Billboard Hot 100 chart; INXS's "The Swing";Jon English's Australian top 20 singles "Turn the Page" and "Hollywood Seven"; and albums for Air Supply and Billy Thorpe. In 2008 he arranged and conducted "Don't Wait Until Tomorrow" for Leo Sayer.

== Screen composer ==
William Motzing had over 30 Australian film and TV soundtracks to his name, including Newsfront, (which opened the London Film Festival and was the first Australian film to screen at the New York Film Festival), Young Einstein (for which he won the Australian Film Institute (AFI) Award for best original music score and the APRA Music Award), The Return of Captain Invincible, starring Alan Arkin and Christopher Lee and The Quiet American (2002). He was nominated for five AFI awards.

== Classical ==
Motzing conducted major symphony orchestras including the Australian Chamber Orchestra, the Australian Opera, and the Australian Ballet and Sydney Symphony Orchestras at the Sydney Opera House Concert Hall. In Europe he conducted the BBC Radio Orchestra, the Irish Radio/Television Concert Orchestra, the Czech Philharmonic, the Budapest Opera orchestra and the Babelsberg Film Studio orchestra in Berlin.

Throughout his life he continued to study conducting with Ernest Matteo, Nicholas Flagello, Ionel Perlea and Olga von Geczy; composition with Ludmila Ulehla and John Mayer at the Birmingham Conservatoire and arranging with Rayburn Wright.

He was a lifelong proponent of the Schillinger System. His students included Jon Rose (violin, historian, composition) and Nigel Westlake (composer, performer, conductor).

== Health ==
William Motzing was misdiagnosed with Parkinson's Disease in 2008. In 2013, his neurologist re-diagnosed his condition as Shy–Drager syndrome (SDS). SDS is a rare, aggressive disease that halts all the major organs of the body, for which there is no known cure.

He continued to teach theory, arranging, modern jazz history, improvisation and ensembles at the Sydney Conservatorium of Music, as he had done since 1971. After retiring in 2011, he returned to New York to live with the family of his son, William John Motzing Jr., while he battled symptoms of SDS including paralysis throughout the body. He died peacefully from complications of the disease on January 30, 2014.

== Feature films ==
=== Composer ===
- Dead Easy (1970)
- Just Out of Reach (1979)
- Newsfront (1978)
- Cathy's Child (1979)
- Undercover (1983)
- The Return of Captain Invincible (1983)
- One Night Stand (1984)
- Stanley (1984)
- Silver City (1984)
- The Coca-Cola Kid (1985)
- Young Einstein (1988)
- Cappuccino (1989)
- Echoes of Paradise (1989)
- A Case of Honor (1991)
- The Quiet American (2002))

== Television ==
=== Composer ===
- Prisoner (1979)
- The Oracle (1979)
- Mother and Son (1984)
- The Girl from Moonooloo (1984)
- Time's Raging (1985)
- The Cowra Breakout (1985)
- Soldiers (1985)
- Vietnam (1987)
- True Believers (1988)
- The First Kangaroos (1988)
- Melba (1988)
- Police State (1989)
- Brides of Christ (1991)
- Stompin' at the Savoy (TV movie) (1992)
- Fronting Up
- Object of Obsession

=== Orchestrator ===
- The Untouchables (1993)
- The Young Indiana Jones Chronicles (1992)

=== Musical Director ===
- You're A Star (Network Ten, 1982)
- The Don Burrows Collection (ABC1, 1981)
- Parkinson (BBC1, 1979)
- Earthwatch (ABC1, 1979)
- The Garry McDonald Show (ABC1, 1977)

== Discography ==
=== Composer ===
- Young Einstein (A Serious Motion Picture Soundtrack) (1988)
- Music From The Best Of Australia's Films (1982)
- Music and songs from the film Newsfront (1978)

=== Arranger/Conductor ===
- Leo Sayer " Don't Wait Until Tomorrow" (2008)
- INXS, Shine Like It Does: The Anthology (1979-1997) (2001)
- Søren Hyldgaard, Moments Of A Dream "Highlights From The Film Music Of Søren Hyldgaard" (2001)
- Elia Cmiral, Battlefield Earth (Original Motion Picture Soundtrack) (2000)
- Everclear, Songs From An American Movie Vol. One: Learning How To Smile (2000)
- John Williams, Close Encounter: The Essential John Williams Film Music Collection (2000)
- Various, Hjælp! Jeg Er En Fisk (2000)
- James Horner, Heart Of The Ocean (The Film Music Of James Horner) (1998)
- The City of Prague Philharmonic, Best of Adventure (1994)
- The City of Prague Philharmonic, Highlander Best of Fantasy (1994)
- The Czech Symphony Orchestra, Best Of The West (1993)
- The Czech Symphony Orchestra, Best Of Science Fiction (1993)
- The LA Symphonic Orchestra, Giants of Cinema, The Best of John Williams (1993)
- The LA Symphonic Orchestra, Giants of Cinema, Ennio Morricone (1993)
- Vince Jones & Grace Knight – Come In Spinner (1990)
- INXS, Listen Like Thieves - The Swing (1985)
- Adelaide Symphony Orchestra, TV Themes, Volume two (1985)
- INXS, The Swing (1984)
- The Neon Philharmonic Orchestra, Music From Great Australian Films (1982)
- The Neon Philharmonic Orchestra, Switched On Classics (1982)
- Billy Field, "Bad Habits" (1981)
- Meco, Impressions Of An American Werewolf In London (1981)
- Meco, The Raiders March / Cairo Nights (1981)
- Peter Allen, I Still Call Australia Home (1980)
- Meco, Meco Plays Music from The Empire Strikes Back (10" EP – 1980)
- Meco, Christmas In The Stars: Star Wars Christmas Album (1980)
- Lynne Hamilton, On The Inside (1979)
- Smokie, The Other Side Of The Road (1979)
- Jon English, English History (1979)
- Kamahl, Let Me Be There (1977)
- Air Supply, "The Whole Thing's Started" (1977)
- Air Supply (1976)
- Jon English Hollywood Seven (1976)
- Sherbet, Howzat (1976)
- Judy Stone, Hasta Manana (1976)
- Billy Thorpe, Million Dollar Bill (1975)
- Kerrie Biddell, Only The Beginning (1975)

=== Producer ===
- Maureen Elkner, Lovetracks (1978)
- The Life Organisation, Pink Steamroller (1974)

=== Trombone ===
- John Sangster, Lord Of The Rings (1975)
