= APRA Awards (Australia) =

Australia music awards

APRA Music Awards
- Current: APRA Music Awards of 2025
- Country: Australia
- Presented by: Australasian Performing Right Association (APRA)
- First award: 1982
- Website: apraamcos.com.au/awards/

The APRA Music Awards in Australia celebrate excellence in contemporary music, honouring songwriters and publishers who have achieved artistic excellence and outstanding success in their fields.

Several award ceremonies are run in Australia by APRA AMCOS (Australasian Performing Right Association / Australasian Mechanical Copyright Owners Society). In addition to the APRA Music Awards, APRA AMCOS, in association with the Australian Music Centre, presents awards for classical music, jazz and improvised music, experimental music and sound art, known as the Art Music Awards. It also runs, in association with the Australian Guild of Screen Composers (AGSC), the Screen Music Awards, to acknowledge excellence in the field of screen composition.

== APRA Music Awards (Australia) ==
The APRA Music Awards were established in 1982 to honour songwriters and music composers for their efforts. The award categories are:

=== Gold Awards ===
From 1982 to 1990, the best songs were given the Gold Award, which was also called the Special Award. In the mid-1980s Platinum Awards were given to significant works from previous years.

Year	Songwriter(s)	Artist	Winning work	Award
1982	Graeham Goble	Little River Band	"Reminiscing"	Gold Award
1982	Graham Russell	Air Supply	"Lost in Love"	Gold Award
1982	Glenn Shorrock	Little River Band	"Cool Change"	Gold Award
1982	Angus Young, Malcolm Young, Bon Scott	AC/DC	"Highway To Hell"	Gold Award
1983	No awards	No awards	No awards	No awards
1984	Graham Russell	Air Supply	"The One That You Love"	Special Award
1984	Colin Hay	Men at Work	"Who Can It Be Now?"	Special Award
1984	Brian May	—N/a	Mad Max film score	Special Award
1985	Colin Hay, Ron Strykert	Men at Work	"Down Under"	Special Award
1985	John Antill	—N/a	"Corroboree"	Special Award
1985	Graeham Goble	Little River Band	"The Other Guy"	Special Award
1985	Reece Kirk	Crystal Gayle	"Our Love Is on the Faultline"	Special Award
1986	Eric Bogle	Eric Bogle	"And the Band Played Waltzing Matilda"	Gold Award
1987	Angus Young, Malcolm Young, Brian Johnson	AC/DC	"Back in Black"	Gold Award
1987	Mark Knopfler	Dire Straits	Brothers in Arms	Gold Award (album)
1988	Jack O'Hagan	—N/a	"Along the Road to Gundagai"	Platinum Award
1988	Gordon Parsons	Slim Dusty	"A Pub with no Beer"	Platinum Award
1988	Rolf Harris	Rolf Harris	"Tie Me Kangaroo Down, Sport"	Platinum Award
1988	Dorothy Dodd	—N/a	"Granada"	Platinum Award
1988	Marie Cowan, Banjo Paterson	—N/a	"Waltzing Matilda"	Platinum Award
1988	Andrew Farriss, Michael Hutchence	INXS	"What You Need"	Gold Award
1988	Peter Best	—N/a	Crocodile Dundee film score	Gold Award
1989	John Antill	—N/a	"Corroboree"	Platinum Award
1989	Harry Vanda & George Young	—N/a	In recognition of the outstanding popularity of their collective works throughout the world	Platinum Award
1989	Neil Finn	Crowded House	"Don't Dream It's Over"	Gold Award
1989	Andrew Farriss, Michael Hutchence	INXS	"Need You Tonight"	Gold Award
1989	Hal David	—N/a	In recognition of the outstanding popularity of his many works in Australia and New Zealand	Gold Award
1989–1990 (Note: held in 1991)	Peter Garrett, Rob Hirst, James Moginie	Midnight Oil	"Beds Are Burning"	Gold Award
1990	Andrew Farriss, Michael Hutchence	INXS	"Devil Inside"	Gold Award
1990	Andrew Farriss, Michael Hutchence	INXS	"New Sensation"	Gold Award

=== Song of the Year ===
Song of the Year is decided by the votes of APRA members. All eligible songs must be written by an APRA member and released in the preceding calendar year for consideration. The Song of the Year award is considered one of the most prestigious of the APRA Music Awards.

Year	Songwriter(s)	Artist	Song
1991	Bakamana Yunipingu, Stuart Kellaway, Gurrumul Yunipingu, Milkayggu Mununggurr, Cal Williams, Paul Kelly	Yothu Yindi	"Treaty"
1992	Rick Price, Heather Field	Rick Price	"Heaven Knows"
1993	Neil Finn and Tim Finn	Crowded House	"Four Seasons in One Day"
1994	Neil Finn	Crowded House	"Distant Sun"
1995	Neil Murray	Christine Anu	"My Island Home"
1996	Tina Arena, Robert Parde, Heather Field	Tina Arena	"Wasn't It Good"
1997	No awards	No awards	No awards
1998	Dean Manning	Leonardo's Bride	"Even When I'm Sleeping"
1999	James Roche	Bachelor Girl	"Buses and Trains"
2000	Jonathan Coghill, John Collins, Ian Haug, Darren Middleton, Bernard Fanning	Powderfinger	"Passenger"
2001	Bernard Fanning	Powderfinger	"My Happiness"
2002	Alex Lloyd	Alex Lloyd	"Amazing"
2003	Kasey Chambers	Kasey Chambers	"Not Pretty Enough"
2004	John Butler	John Butler Trio	"Zebra"
2005	Missy Higgins and Kevin Griffin	Missy Higgins	"Scar"
2006	Ben Lee and McGowan Southworth	Ben Lee	"Catch My Disease"
2007	Glenn Richards	Augie March	"One Crowded Hour"
2008	Daniel Johns and Julian Hamilton	Silverchair	"Straight Lines"
2009	Chris Cheney	The Living End	"White Noise"
2010	Dougy Mandagi and Lorenzo Sillitto	The Temper Trap	"Sweet Disposition"
2011	Angus Stone, Julia Stone	Angus & Julia Stone	"Big Jet Plane"
2012	Wally de Backer, Luiz Bonfa	Gotye feat Kimbra	"Somebody That I Used To Know"
2013	Kevin Parker	Tame Impala	"Feels Like We Only Go Backwards"
2014	James Keogh	Vance Joy	"Riptide"
2015	Sia Furler, Jesse Shatkin	Sia	"Chandelier"
2016	Kevin Parker	Tame Impala	"Let It Happen"
2017	D.D Dumbo a.k.a. Oliver Perry	D.D Dumbo	"Satan"
2018	Paul Kelly, Billy Miller	Paul Kelly	"Firewood and Candles"
2019	Amy Billings	Amy Shark	"I Said Hi"
2020	Toni Watson	Tones and I	"Dance Monkey"
2021	Joel Davison, Rob Hirst, Bunna Lawrie	Midnight Oil featuring Dan Sultan, Joel Davison, Kaleena Briggs, Bunna Lawrie	"Gadigal Land"
2022	The Kid Laroi, Justin Bieber, Isaac De Boni, Omer Fedi, Magnus Høiberg, Michael Mule, Charlie Puth, Subhaan Rahman, Blake Slatkin	The Kid Laroi & Justin Bieber	"Stay"
2023	Harley Streten, Sarah Aarons	Flume featuring May-a	"Say Nothing"

=== Songwriter of the Year ===
Songwriter of the Year is voted by APRA's Board of Writer and Publisher Directors rewarding the songwriter who has recorded the most impressive body of work in the previous year.

Year	Songwriter
1991	Phil Buckle
1992	Neil Finn and Tim Finn
1993	Greg Arnold
1994	Neil Finn
1995	Daniel Johns and Benjamin Gillies
1996	Nick Cave
1997	No awards
1998	Darren Hayes and Daniel Jones
1999	Paul Kelly
2000	Darren Hayes and Daniel Jones
2001	Ella Hooper and Jesse Hooper
2002	Kasey Chambers
2003	Daniel Johns
2004	Powderfinger
2005	Jet
2006	Bernard Fanning
2007	Andrew Stockdale, Myles Heskett and Chris Ross
2008	Daniel Johns
2009	Kim Moyes and Julian Hamilton
2010	Angus Young and Malcolm Young
2011	Angus Stone and Julia Stone
2012	Gotye
2013	Sia
2014	Sia
2015	Sia
2016	Courtney Barnett
2017	Harley Streten p.k.a. Flume
2018	Adam Briggs p.k.a. Briggs and Daniel Rankine p.k.a. Trials
2019	Sarah Aarons
2020	Barry Francis p.k.a. DJ Debris, Matthew Lambert p.k.a. Suffa, Daniel Smith p.k.a. MC Pressure (members of Hilltop Hoods)
2021	Kevin Parker
2024	The Teskey Brothers, Josh Teskey and Sam Teskey

=== Ted Albert Award for Outstanding Services to Australian Music ===
The Ted Albert Award for Outstanding Services to Australian Music is decided by APRA's Board of Writer and Publisher Directors for a lifetime contribution. The Award is named after Ted Albert whose company Albert Productions put out records by The Easybeats, AC/DC and John Paul Young.

Year	Winner
1991	Allan Hely
1992	John Sturman
1993	Peter Sculthorpe
1994	Ian Meldrum
1995	Harry Vanda and George Young
1996	Ron Tudor
1997	No awards
1998	Michael Gudinski
1999	Slim Dusty
2000	Triple J
2001	Charles Fischer
2002	Barry Chapman
2003	Angus Young, Malcolm Young and Bon Scott
2004	Don Burrows
2005	Michael Chugg
2006	Bill Armstrong
2007	Michael McMartin
2008	Roger Davies
2009	Revoked
2010	Jimmy Little
2011	Paul Kelly
2012	Mary Lopez
2013	The Seekers
2014	Lindy Morrison
2015	Fifa Riccobono
2016	Cold Chisel
2017	Archie Roach
2018	Midnight Oil
2019	Rob Potts
2020	No awards
2021	Helen Reddy, Joy McKean
2022	The Wiggles
2023	Colin Hay, Colleen Ironside
2024	Bart Willoughby

=== Breakthrough Songwriter Award ===
Breakthrough Songwriter Award is decided by APRA's Board of Writer and Publisher Directors for an emerging songwriter or groups of writers. The award category was first introduced by APRA in 2002.

Year	Winner
2002	Jennifer Waite and Grant Wallis (Aneiki)
2002	Sia
2003	Craig Nicholls (The Vines)
2004	Delta Goodrem
2005	Missy Higgins
2006	Myles Heskett, Christopher Ross and Andrew Stockdale (Wolfmother)
2007	Glenn Richards (Augie March)
2008	Sally Seltmann (New Buffalo)
2009	Geoffrey Gurrumul Yunupingu
2010	Nick Littlemore, Jonathan Sloan, Luke Steele (Empire of the Sun)
2011	Megan Washington
2012	Killian Gavin, Jonathon Hart, Timothy Hart, David Hosking, Jacob Tarasenko (Boy & Bear)
2013	Matthew Colwell (p.k.a. 360), Kaelyn Behr (p.k.a. Styalz)
2014	Louis Schoorl
2015	Michael Clifford, Luke Hemmings, Calum Hood, Ashton Irwin (5 Seconds of Summer)
2016	Alex Hope
2017	Troye Sivan a.k.a. Troye Sivan Mellet
2018	Sarah Aarons
2019	Dean Lewis
2020	Toni Watson p.k.a. Tones and I
2021	Charlton Howard p.k.a. The Kid Laroi
2022	Genesis Owusu
2023	Sampa Tembo p.k.a. Sampa The Great

=== Awards for Most Performed Works ===
There are a number of awards given for most performed work based on a statistical analysis of APRA's database. These awards include "Most Performed Australian Work of the Year", "Most Performed Australian Work Overseas", "Most Performed Foreign Work", "Most Performed Jazz Work", "Most Performed Country Work" and "Most Performed Dance Work".

== Art Music Awards (with AMC) ==
In 2001, APRA joined forces with the Australian Music Centre (AMC) to present awards for Australian classical music, known as Classical Music Awards. The AMC had been presenting annual awards for classical music since 1988, apart from a 1993–1995 hiatus due to funding cuts. The participation of APRA helped to secure the future of the awards, which are the only Australian awards for contemporary Australian classical music. This award has been won by well-known composers including Brenton Broadstock, Brett Dean, Ross Edwards, Georges Lentz, Liza Lim, Richard Mills, and Peter Sculthorpe. After another hiatus in 2010, the event returned as the Art Music Awards the following year, restructured and with two new categories.

The awards now cover classical, jazz and improvised music, experimental music and sound art, recognising achievement in composition, performance, education and presentation. As of 2020, the current award structure recognises eleven annual awards and Luminary Awards for sustained contribution (nationally and for each state and territory) in Australian art music. There is also a discretionary award, The Richard Gill Award for Distinguished Services to Australian Music.

=== Richard Gill Award for Distinguished Services to Australian Music ===
Originally named Distinguished Services to Australian Music Award, from 2019 it was renamed in honour of Australian conductor and educator Richard Gill (1941–2018). It is determined by APRA's Board of Writer and Publisher Directors and the Australian Music Centre Board for a lifetime contribution to the art music community.

Year	Winner
2002	Richard Meale
2003	Robert Hughes
2004	Miriam Hyde
2005	Anne Boyd
2006	Musica Viva Australia
2007	Belinda Webster
2008	Judy Bailey
2009	Michael Kieran Harvey
2010	No Awards
2011	John Hopkins; Patrick Thomas
2012	Peter Sculthorpe
2013	George Dreyfus
2014	Richard Gill
2015	Larry Sitsky
2016	Helen Gifford
2017	John Pochée
2018	Robyn Holmes
2019	The Necks
2020	Ros Bandt
2021	Penny Lomax; Maureen Cooney
2022	Nigel Butterley
2023	William Barton
2024	Lyn Williams
2025	Jon Rose; Hollis Taylor
2026	Liza Lim

== Screen Music Awards (with AGSC) ==
The annual Screen Music Awards were first presented in 2002 by APRA and AMCOS in conjunction with the Australian Guild of Screen Composers (AGSC). The ceremony, held in November, acknowledges excellence and innovation in the field of screen composition, and as of 2019 covers 13 categories.

- 2002 Awards

International Achievement Award – David Hirschfelder
Best Feature Film Score – Alan John for The Bank
Best Soundtrack Album – Paul Kelly, Mairead Hannan, Kev Carmody, John Romeril, Deirdre Hannan and Alice Garner for One Night the Moon

- 2003 Awards

International Achievement Award – Bruce Smeaton
Best Feature Film Score – Nigel Westlake for The Nugget
Best Soundtrack Album – Cezary Skubiszewski for After the Deluge

- 2004 Awards

International Achievement Award – Lisa Gerrard
Best Feature Film Score – Elizabeth Drake for Japanese Story
Best Soundtrack Album – Iva Davies, Christopher Gordon and Richard Tognetti for Master and Commander: The Far Side of the World

- 2005 Awards

International Achievement Award – Bruce Rowland
Best Feature Film Score – Ben Ely, Matthew Fitzgerald, Tom Schutzinger and Peter Kelly (Decoder Ring) for Somersault
Best Soundtrack Album – Roger Mason for The Extra

- 2006 Awards

International Achievement Award – Peter Best
Best Feature Film Score – Francois Tetaz for Wolf Creek
Best Soundtrack Album – David Bridie, Albert David and Kadu for RAN: Remote Area Nurse

- 2007 Awards

International Achievement Award – The Wiggles
Best Feature Film Score – Nigel Westlake for Miss Potter
Best Soundtrack Album – Nigel Westlake for Miss Potter

- 2008 Awards

International Achievement Award – Garry McDonald and Laurie Stone
Best Feature Film Score – David Hirschfelder for Children of the Silk Road
Best Soundtrack Album – Michael Yezerski for The Black Balloon
Best Music for a Short Film – Geoffrey Russell for Noir Drive

- 2009 Awards

International Achievement Award – Guy Gross
Best Feature Film Score – Lisa Gerrard for Balibo
Best Soundtrack Album – Cezary Skubiszewski for Death Defying Acts

- 2010 Awards

Best Feature Film Score – Christopher Gordon for Mao's Last Dancer
Best Soundtrack Album – Christopher Gordon for Mao's Last Dancer

- 2011 Awards

Best Feature Film Score – Jed Kurzel for Snowtown
Best Soundtrack Album – Rafael May for Road Train

- 2012 Awards

Best Feature Film Score – Lisa Gerrard for Burning Man
Best Soundtrack Album – Michael Lira / Jono Ma / Antony Partos / Irine Vela for The Slap

- 2023 Screen Music Award Winners

Best Feature Film Score – Benjamin Speed for The Portable Door
Best Soundtrack Album – Nigel Westlake for Blueback

- 2024 Screen Music Awards

== Other awards ==
=== Emily Burrows Award ===
The Emily Burrows Award was instituted in 2001 in memory of Emily Burrows, a former APRA AMCOS membership representative and compliance officer. It is awarded to a South Australian artist or band annually with a $5,000 prize, to further their development and career. Electric Fields won it in 2016, with previous winners including Hilltop Hoods and The Beards, Dead Roo, and Ollie English

In 2019 the prize was awarded at the South Australian Music Awards (SAM Awards) for the first time, with Dead Roo winning the Award. Seabass were presented with the award at the SAM Awards in 2020, and Tilly Tjala Thomas won it in 2021. Thomas sings in both Nukunu language and English, with her single "Ngana Nyunyi" sung in both. She won triple j Unearthed's NIMAs competition, giving her the opportunity to play at the National Indigenous Music Awards in 2021.

In 2023, Indigenous hip hop band from the APY lands, DEM MOB, won the award.

=== Top 30 Australian Songs (2001 only) ===
As part of its 75th anniversary celebrations in 2001, APRA created a list of the top 30 Australian songs. A panel of 100 music personalities were asked to list the ten best Australian songs, the data was compiled and the Top Ten in numerical order, was announced at the 2001 APRA Music Awards ceremony. At the ceremony You Am I performed the #1 listed song "Friday on My Mind" with Ross Wilson performing the #2 listed song "Eagle Rock". The next 20 songs in the Top 30 had been announced four weeks earlier.

== See also ==
- APRA Awards (New Zealand) – annual awards in New Zealand, including the Silver Scroll Award for songwriting
- APRA Music Awards of 1982, and every year following
