= Seven Keys =

Seven Keys can refer to:

- Seven Keys (game show), an American game show hosted by Jack Narz which ran during 1960–65
- Seven Keys (film distributor), a film distributor based in Australia and Great Britain
- Seven Keys (film), a 1962 film
