= Sonbol Taefi =

- Born: Southern Iran
- Origin: New Zealand
- Genres: Persian music, devotional music
- Occupations: Singer, composer, music producer
- Website: www.sonboltaefi.com

Sonbol Taefi is an Iranian-born New Zealand singer, composer and music producer whose work includes Persian-language music and musical settings of texts from the Baháʼí writings and Persian poetry. She has released albums in Persian and English and has performed internationally in New Zealand, Australia, Canada, the United States, South Africa, China, Macau, Samoa, England and Argentina.

== Early life and education ==
Taefi was born in southern Iran and began performing as a child. She appeared on children's television programmes in Bandar Abbas from the age of nine and subsequently performed with bands and orchestras. She participated regularly in arts festivals and won first prize in performance and singing for five consecutive years before completing high school. She later moved to London, where she studied for five years.

Taefi left Iran in 1977 to study in England, and moved to New Zealand in 1984, where she subsequently developed her career as a singer, composer and recording artist.

== Musical career ==
Taefi's recording career has included predominantly Persian-language albums, as well as recordings in English and other languages. Her music has drawn on Persian poetry and on texts from the Baháʼí writings. Her work combines contemporary musical approaches with classical influences. Her musical director, Stephen Small, has arranged several of her Persian-language recordings, adding Western musical influences to her songs.

Her album The Other Wing, recorded entirely in English, was released in New Zealand in 1996. The album focused on the advancement and equality of women and men. The recording is no longer commercially available.

Taefi was interviewed on the New Zealand television programme 5:30 Live in 1992, following a trip to South Africa, during which she sang one song. She has also given interviews on national television in Macau and on radio programmes in Los Angeles.

Over the course of her career, Taefi has given concerts in numerous cities and countries, including performances in Canada, the United States, Australia, South Africa and Argentina. In 2017 she performed in San Juan, Argentina. Independent coverage of that concert, published in the San Juan newspaper Diario de Cuyo, described Taefi as an Iranian singer who developed her career in New Zealand and reported that the concert — with pianist Stephen Small — was her only performance in South America during that visit.

== Music and the Baháʼí writings ==
A significant part of Taefi's work consists of setting passages from the Baháʼí writings and poetry associated with early Baháʼí figures to music. Her recordings have included texts by Baháʼu'lláh, ʻAbdu'l-Bahá, Táhirih, Varqá, Jonún and Nush.

Her 1999 album Verses of the Enamoured consisted primarily of Persian-language settings of poetry and passages associated with the Baháʼí tradition.

Her subsequent albums included Parvaz, Shiraz, Season of Light, In the Path of Love, Along the Tigris, the EP I Am Iran (من ایرانم, Man Iranam; 2013), Sea of Mystery and Ámis (2018).

=== Sea of Mystery ===
In 2013, Taefi recorded Sea of Mystery, a predominantly Persian-language album, with the Czech National Symphony Orchestra in Prague. The album was conducted and produced by composer Tom Price and subsequently released in 2014. It contains 13 tracks combining Persian texts and orchestral arrangements.

The album includes musical settings of texts associated with Baháʼí poets and writers, as well as prayers by ʻAbdu'l-Bahá and Baháʼu'lláh.

=== Ámis ===
Taefi's 2018 album Ámis is a nine-track tribute to Ebrahim Monsefi, a poet, singer and songwriter from Bandar Abbas whose cassette recordings had circulated informally in Iran. Unlike most of Taefi's catalogue, Ámis does not draw on the Baháʼí writings; it is recorded entirely in her native Bandari dialect, as a tribute to her hometown after decades spent away from it. Voice of America's Persian service reported on one of Taefi's Bandari-dialect singles in 2019, noting a positive reception among Iranian listeners, particularly in the southern provinces.

=== Coral & Pearls ===
Taefi's latest released album is Coral & Pearls, a multilingual devotional album released in 2020. The album contains nine songs based on writings of the Báb, Baháʼu'lláh and ʻAbdu'l-Bahá, recorded using acoustic instrumentation including piano, guitar, santour, percussion and strings. Most of Taefi's musical work is in Persian, although she also performs in English and other languages; Coral & Pearls includes Persian, English, Arabic and Spanish material.

The album features collaborations with musicians including Luke Slott, Elika Mahony and Nasime Wattiaux. The title track is based on a marriage prayer revealed by ʻAbdu'l-Bahá; Taefi first set it to music for her daughter's wedding before later arranging it for full ensemble and recording it with the Czech National Symphony.

=== Symphony of Light ===
Taefi is producing Symphony of Light, an international orchestral project featuring music based on the Baháʼí sacred writings.

The album was recorded in Sofia, Bulgaria, with the Sofia Session Orchestra. The project brings together compositions by musicians from different countries and includes collaborations with Elika Mahony, Luke Slott, Ali Yousefi, Grant Hindin Miller, Jasmine Howard and Eric Harper. Recording took place in 2025, with 19 songs composed by eight musicians.

The project continues Taefi's work of combining sacred texts with contemporary vocal music and orchestral arrangements.

== Languages ==
Although Persian is Taefi's native language, she has also performed or recorded in English, Samoan, Māori, and Spanish.

== Discography ==
Selected albums include:

- The Other Wing (1996)
- Verses of the Enamoured (1999)
- Season of Light (2000)
- Parvaz (2004)
- Shiraz (2006)
- Along the Tigris (2009)
- In the Path of Love (no longer commercially available)
- I Am Iran (من ایرانم, Man Iranam; EP, 2013)
- Sea of Mystery (2014; recorded 2013)
- Ámis (2018)
- Coral & Pearls (2020)

Taefi's catalogue also includes later singles and collaborative recordings, such as The Photograph (2012) and Sarnevesht (2020). Two further singles, Jane Jahan and Yek Rooz, set poems by Mahvash Sabet to music.
