= Georgia Clay (song) =

Single by Josh Kelley

from the album Georgia Clay
- Released: August 9, 2010
- Genre: Country
- Length: 3:04
- Label: MCA Nashville
- Songwriters: Josh Kelley; Charles Kelley; Clint Lagerberg
- Producer: Clint Lagerberg

Josh Kelley singles chronology
| "To Remember" (2009) | "Georgia Clay" (2010) | "Gone Like That" (2011) |

"Georgia Clay" is a song written by Josh Kelley, Charles Kelley and Clint Lagerberg. It was recorded by Josh Kelley and released in August 2010 as the first single and title track from his debut country album Georgia Clay.

== Critical reception ==
Matt Bjorke of Roughstock gave the song four stars of five, calling it an "immediate, universal earworm that fans will love to hear on the radio." Dan Milliken, reviewing the song for Country Universe, gave it a C−, describing it as "the most generic sort of high school nostalgia." Daryl Addison of Great American Country reviewed the song favorably, saying that "Kelley’s slight southern drawl is completely at home here."

== Chart performance ==
"Georgia Clay" debuted at number 50 on the U.S. Billboard Hot Country Songs chart for the week of September 4, 2010.

| Chart (2010–2011) | Peak position |
|---|---|
| Canada Country (Billboard) | 46 |
| US Hot Country Songs (Billboard) | 17 |
| US Billboard Hot 100 | 87 |

=== Year-end charts ===
| Chart (2011) | Position |
|---|---|
| US Country Songs (Billboard) | 78 |
