= Georgia Clay =

2011 album by Josh Kelley

Studio album by Josh Kelley
- Released: March 22, 2011
- Genre: Country
- Label: MCA Nashville
- Producer: Clint Lagerberg

Josh Kelley chronology
To Remember (2008)	Georgia Clay (2011)	New Lane Road (2016)

Singles from Georgia Clay
- 1. "Georgia Clay" Released: August 9, 2010; 2. "Gone Like That" Released: May 23, 2011

Professional ratings
Review scores
Source	Rating
Allmusic	2.5/5 stars
Country Weekly	3.5/5 stars
Engine 145	3.5/5 stars

Georgia Clay is the seventh studio album by American singer Josh Kelley. It is his first country music album, and it was released via MCA Nashville on March 22, 2011.

== Content ==
Georgia Clay is Kelley's first release to the country music format. Kelley co-wrote the title track with his brother, Charles Kelley of Lady Antebellum, and album producer Clint Lagerberg.

== Critical reception ==
Karlie Justus of Engine 145 rated the album three-and-a-half stars out of five, saying that it was "surprisingly satisfactory" but criticizing the production choices on some songs. It also received three-and-a-half stars from Country Weekly reviewer Jessica Phillips, who criticized the title track for being "too familiar to be gripping", but said of the rest of the album, "Overall, Josh's sound boasts enough twang to keep it country and enough soulful passion to keep things interesting." Giving it two-and-a-half stars, Andrew Leahey of Allmusic wrote that Kelley "doesn’t sound entirely convincing as a Nashville star." He also thought that Kelley's voice sounded "forced" and that the lyrics lacked hooks.

== Track listing ==
No.	Title	Writer(s)	Length
1.	"Georgia Clay"	Josh Kelley, Charles Kelley, Clint Lagerberg	3:04
2.	"A Real Good Try"	J. Kelley	3:38
3.	"Gone Like That"	J. Kelley, Lagerberg, Nicolle Galyon	3:58
4.	"Baby Blue Eyes"	J. Kelley, Lee Brice	3:39
5.	"Naleigh Moon"	J. Kelley, Lagerberg	3:43
6.	"Two Cups of Coffee"	J. Kelley	3:53
7.	"Rainin' Whiskey"	J. Kelley, Robert Hatch, Paul Jenkins	3:28
8.	"Great Idea"	J. Kelley, Lagerberg, Lee Thomas Miller	3:26
9.	"Learning You"	J. Kelley, Lagerberg, Craig Wiseman	4:17
10.	"Ain't Lettin' Go"	J. Kelley, C. Kelley, Patrick Davis	4:02
11.	"Don't You Go"	J. Kelley, Kyle Jacobs, Rachel Thibodeau	4:14
Total length:			41:22

== Personnel ==
- Tom Brislin- Wurlitzer
- Alan Chang- Fender Rhodes, Hammond B-3 organ, piano
- Chad Cromwell- drums
- Jerry Douglas- dobro
- Eric Kertes- bass guitar
- Rob Hatch- crowd noise
- Wes Hightower- background vocals
- Dan Hochhalter- fiddle, strings
- Darwin Johnson- bass guitar
- Charlie Judge- Hammond B-3 organ, keyboards, piano, tack piano, Wurlitzer
- Gene Jung- drums
- Josh Kelley- crowd noise, acoustic guitar, harmonica, shaker, tambourine, lead vocals, background vocals
- Clint Lagerberg- crowd noise, acoustic guitar, bass guitar, electric guitar, tenor guitar, handclapping, mandolin, programming, string arrangements, background vocals
- Chris McHugh- drums, percussion
- Ashley Monroe- background vocals
- Dottie Rager- crowd noise
- Shannan Tipton-Neese- crowd noise
- Glenn Worf- bass guitar

== Charts ==
Chart (2011)	Peak position
U.S. Billboard 200	92
U.S. Billboard Top Country Albums	16
