= APRA Music Awards of 1988 =

Annual Australian music awards

- Date: 1988
- Website: apra-amcos.com.au

The Australasian Performing Right Association Awards of 1988 (generally known as APRA Awards) are a series of awards held in 1988. The APRA Music Awards were presented by Australasian Performing Right Association (APRA) and the Australasian Mechanical Copyright Owners Society (AMCOS).

== Awards ==
Only winners are noted

| Award | Winner |
|---|---|
| Platinum Award | "Along the Road to Gundagai" (Jack O'Hagan) |
| Platinum Award | "A Pub with No Beer" (Gordon Parsons) |
| Platinum Award | "Tie Me Kangaroo Down, Sport" (Rolf Harris) |
| Platinum Award | "Granada" (English version lyrics, Dorothy Dodd) |
| Platinum Award | "Waltzing Matilda" (Marie Cowan, Andrew "Banjo" Paterson) |
| Gold Award | "What You Need" (Andrew Farriss, Michael Hutchence) by INXS |
| Gold Award | Music from the Film Crocodile Dundee (Peter Best) by Peter Best |
| Most Performed Australasian Music for Film | Footrot Flats (Dave Dobbyn) by Dave Dobbyn |
| Most Performed Australasian Country Work | "True Blue" (John Williamson) by John Williamson |
| Most Performed Australasian Popular Work | "Don't Dream It's Over" (Neil Finn) by Crowded House |
| Most Performed Australasian Serious Work | Overture with Fanfare (Richard Mills) |
| Most Performed Australasian Jazz Work | "Willow Tree" (John Sangster) by John Sangster |
| Most Performed Overseas Work | "Pressure Down" (Harry Bogdanovs) by John Farnham |

== See also ==
- Music of Australia
