= King Fox =

Australian pop band

King Fox was an Australian pop band formed ca. 1967 by a group of school-friends from Sydney's Eastern Suburbs.

King Fox came to prominence after entering a talent competition. King Fox's entry was an original song called "Unforgotten Dreams". The song generated a strong public reaction when played on air, and became a Top 5 hit in Sydney, charting for over four months.

== Line up ==
After early changes, the band settled into the lineup of:

- Paul Radcliffe - guitar, vocals, flute
- David King - guitar, vocals
- Billy Field - bass, vocals
- Peter Muller - organ, vocals
- Andy Evans - drums

== History ==
King Fox came to prominence in Sydney in mid-1969 after entering a talent competition run by Sydney radio station 2UW and independent producer Martin Erdman. The group's average age was 16 at the time. King Fox's entry was an original song called "Unforgotten Dreams", an atmospheric psych-pop original written by Radcliffe and King, featuring flute by Radcliffe. It was produced by Martin Erdman and recorded at his studio in just one hour.

The song generated a strong public reaction when played on air, and King Fox ended up being one of four groups out of more than 150 whose work was selected for release as a single on Erdman's Du Monde Records. "Unforgotten Dreams" became a Top 5 hit in Sydney, charting for over four months, a feat that was also remarkable because of the song's length, 4 min 56 sec, almost double the average length of a pop single at that time.

In January 1970, during the summer vacation, King Fox recorded an album at Erdman's World of Sound Studios in Ramsgate, the first recordings to be made on Erdman's newly purchased 4-track recording gear.

Most accounts of King Fox mention the affluence of the members' home suburbs. It has often been claimed that the band broke up in 1970 when the boys' instruments, payrolled by their parents, were confiscated because they were neglecting their studies. This however is not true—in a recent interview on the ABC-TV current affairs show Stateline, Radcliffe and King revealed that the parents of the group members demanded an end to the band after Sydney tabloid the Sunday Mirror published an intrusive article about the band which named the private schools that several of the boys attended and mocked their supposedly affluent family backgrounds.

== Post breakup ==
The group briefly reformed in 1972 and released one unsuccessful single on the Festival Records label, but broke up permanently soon after.

The tracks the band had recorded for their proposed LP were never mixed or released at the time, because the group broke up just days after the last track was recorded. Erdman long thought that the tapes had been lost after he moved his studio, but they were rediscovered a few years ago and in May 2007 Radcliffe and Erdman mixed the tracks and the 'lost' recordings, which were then compiled with the other existing King Fox tracks on the CD 70207: The (Un)Forgotten Album, which was released on the revived Du Monde imprint in May 2008.

Bassist Billy Field went on to establish the renowned Paradise Studios in Sydney in 1979, and he then launched a solo career as a piano playing singer-songwriter. He had two nationwide hits in 1981 with "Bad Habits" and "You Weren't In Love With Me" (a national #1), and his album Bad Habits was a best-seller.

== Discography ==
=== Singles ===
- "Unforgotten Dreams"/"Alone So Alone" (Du Monde SDM-307, 1969) - # 7 Sydney (The Book); # 8 Sydney (Ryan)
- "Timepiece"/"Will You Love Me Tomorrow" (Du Monde SDM-317, 1970)
- "I Think You're Fine"/"We're Gonna Think Of A Name" (Festival FK-4708, 1972)

=== EPs ===
- Unforgotten Dreams (c.1970)
