= Diamond Dave (album) =

Studio album by David Lee Roth
- Released: July 8, 2003
- Studio: Henson (Hollywood)
- Genres: Blues rock; hard rock
- Length: 45:41
- Label: Magna Carta
- Producers: David Lee Roth; Alex Gibson; Nathan Jenkins; Jeremy Zuckerman

David Lee Roth chronology
DLR Band (1998)	Diamond Dave (2003)	Greatest Hits: The Deluxe Edition (2013)

Professional ratings
Review scores
Source	Rating
AllMusic	3/5 stars
The Daily Vault	B
Entertainment Weekly	F
KNAC	3.5/5 stars
Rolling Stone	2/5 stars

Diamond Dave is the sixth studio album by David Lee Roth, former lead vocalist of Van Halen. It was released in 2003 on Magna Carta Records.

== Background ==
The album was recorded at Henson Recording Studios in Hollywood, California. It consists mostly of covers of older hard rock and blues songs, and has an overall laid back bluesy sound. Two of the tracks—a remake of the 1978 Van Halen song "Ice Cream Man" and a cover of "Bad Habits"—had been recorded in 1995, but were not released at that time. However, Roth financed a black-and-white music video for "Ice Cream Man", paying $100,000 of his own money to promote his '95 Las Vegas residency.

== Track listing ==
No.	Title	Writer(s)	Original artist(s)	Length
1.	"You Got the Blues, Not Me..."	Chris Youlden	Savoy Brown	3:17
2.	"Made Up My Mind"	Youlden	Savoy Brown	3:00
3.	"Stay While the Night is Young"	Youlden	Savoy Brown	3:43
4.	"Shoo Bop"	Steve Miller	Steve Miller Band	5:11
5.	"She's Looking Good"	Rodger Collins	Rodger Collins / Wilson Pickett	2:50
6.	"Soul Kitchen"	John Densmore; Robby Krieger; Ray Manzarek; Jim Morrison	The Doors	4:32
7.	"If 6 Was 9"	Jimi Hendrix	The Jimi Hendrix Experience	3:32
8.	"That Beatles Tune"	Lennon–McCartney	The Beatles	3:49
9.	"Medicine Man"	David Lee Roth		1:12
10.	"Let It All Hang Out"	William David Cunningham	The Hombres	2:25
11.	"Thug Pop"	Roth; John Lowery		3:35
12.	"Act One"	Roth		1:34
13.	"Ice Cream Man"	John Brim	John Brim / Van Halen	3:23
14.	"Bad Habits"	Billy Field; Thomas Shelton Price	Billy Field	3:44
Total length:				45:41

== Personnel ==
- David Lee Roth – vocals, harmonica (2, 9)
- Nathan Jenkins – programming, sound effects (10)
- Jeremy Zuckerman – programming, Hammond B3 organ (2, 4), rhythm guitars (2–4, 8, 11), Rhodes piano (5), organ (7), lead guitar (7, 10)
- Alex Gibson – accordion (3), percussion (3, 8), backing vocals (3), Mellotron (8), lead guitar (10)
- Zac Rae – keyboards (6)
- Greg Phillinganes – acoustic piano (13)
- Brett Tuggle – keyboards (14)
- Brian Young – guitars (1–6, 8, 11)
- Toshi Hiketa – rhythm guitars (5, 8)
- Nile Rodgers – guitars (13)
- Ron Richotte – guitars (14)
- James Lomenzo – bass (1–8, 11)
- Tracy Wormworth – bass (13)
- James Hunting – bass (14)
- Ray Luzier – drums (1–8, 11), backing vocals (3)
- Omar Hakim – drums (13)
- Gregg Bissonette – drums (14)
- Jaime Sickora – cowbell (1)
- Scott Page – alto saxophone (1), baritone saxophone (1), saxophone (5)
- Edgar Winter – saxophone (13, 14)
- Lee Thornburg – trombone (1), trumpet (1)
- The Crowell Sisters – backing vocals (13)

=== Production ===
- David Lee Roth – producer, art direction
- Alex Gibson – producer, recording, mixing
- Nathan Jenkins – additional producer, Pro Tools engineer, sound design
- Jeremy Zuckerman – additional producer, digital editing, sound design
- Brian Humphrey – second engineer
- Kevin Mills – second engineer
- Jaime Sickora – second engineer
- Brian Gardner – mastering at Bernie Grundman Mastering (Hollywood, California)
- Vic Lepejian – art direction
- Neil Zlozower – photography

== Charts ==
Chart (2003)	Peak position
US Independent Albums (Billboard)	18
