= You Weren't in Love with Me =

1981 single by Billy Field

Single by Billy Field

from the album Bad Habits
- B-side: "Celebrity Lane"
- Released: July 1981
- Studio: Paradise, Albert, Studios 301 (Sydney, Australia)
- Length: 3:33
- Label: WEA
- Songwriter: Billy Field
- Producers: Billy Field; Tom Price

Billy Field singles chronology
"Bad Habits" (1981)	"You Weren't in Love with Me" (1981)	"True Love" (1982)

"You Weren't in Love with Me" is a song by Australian singer-songwriter Billy Field. It was released in July 1981 as the second and final single from his debut studio album, Bad Habits. The song peaked at number one on the Australian Kent Music Report and entered the top 30 in New Zealand. At the APRA Music Awards of 1982, the song won Most Performed Australasian Popular Work.

In 1981, Mick Fleetwood covered the song for his debut solo album The Visitor. Fleetwood had heard a demo of the song with Richard Dashut in an Australian bar prior to the recording sessions for The Visitor had occurred. In an interview with Billboard, Fleetwood mentioned that Fields' version "tuned out to be a hug hit for the artist...but at the time it was just a demo. We asked the bar owner about it and he said that Fields brought it in just for him to play at his restaurant." Fleetwood's cover was released as a single in August 1981, with "Amelle (Come On Show Me Your Heart)" as its B-side.

== Track listings ==
Australian 7-inch single

A. "You Weren't in Love with Me" – 3:24
B. "Celebrity Lane" – 2:41

UK 7-inch single

A. "You Weren't in Love with Me" – 3:24
B. "Baby I'm Easy" – 2:16

== Charts ==
=== Weekly charts ===
Weekly chart performance for "You Weren't in Love With Me"
Chart (1981–1982)	Peak position
Australia (Kent Music Report)	1
New Zealand (Recorded Music NZ)	22
UK Singles (OCC)	67

=== Year-end charts ===
Year-end chart performance for "You Weren't in Love With Me"
Chart (1981)	Position
Australia (Kent Music Report)	14

== See also ==
- List of number-one singles in Australia during the 1980s
- List of top 25 singles for 1981 in Australia
