= For the Ride Home =

Studio album by Josh Kelley
- Released: June 3, 2003
- Genre: Pop rock
- Length: 50:04 (disc 1); 13:15 (disc 2)
- Label: Hollywood (US)
- Producer: John Alagía; Josh Kelley

Josh Kelley chronology
For the Ride Home (2003)	Almost Honest (2005)

Alternative cover
- For the Ride Home two-disc re-release

Professional ratings
Review scores
Source	Rating
AllMusic	4/5 stars

For the Ride Home is the debut album of singer Josh Kelley. It was re-released in 2004 with different artwork and a bonus disc. The album peaked at #159 on the Billboard 200 album chart and #5 on the Top Heatseekers Chart.

== Track listing ==
All tracks are written by Josh Kelley.

No.	Title	Length
1.	"Amazing"	3:45
2.	"Everybody Wants You"	3:56
3.	"Travelin'"	3:00
4.	"Old Time Memory"	4:17
5.	"Home to Me"	4:42
6.	"Angeles"	3:30
7.	"I Saw You"	2:56
8.	"Small Town Boy"	3:13
9.	"Faces"	4:14
10.	"Follow You"	3:22
11.	"Perfect 10"	3:29
12.	"Amen"	4:27
13.	"Pokerface"	4:14
Total length:		49:05

Disc Two (2004 re-release only)
No.	Title	Length
1.	"Dying Man"	3:56
2.	"Solid Ground"	2:55
3.	"Small Town Boy" (Acoustic Version)	3:14
4.	"Amazing" (Acoustic Version)	3:44
Total length:		13:49

== For the Short Ride Home ==
For the Short Ride Home is a digital-only release that includes the four songs from the second disc of the re-release. It was first made available on October 19, 2004.

== Singles ==
Title	Chart (2004)	Peak position
"Amazing"	US Billboard Hot 100	79
"Amazing"	US Adult Top 40	8
"Everybody Wants You"	US Adult Top 40	24

== Personnel ==
- Josh Kelley – vocals, acoustic guitars, handclaps (1, 3, 7), electric guitars (7), dobro (9), drum programming (11), Rhodes electric piano (13), Wurlitzer electric piano (13)
- Dave Yaden – Wurlitzer electric piano (1, 11), Hammond organ (1–3, 5, 6, 10, 11), acoustic piano (4, 8, 12), synthesizers (7), clavinet (11)
- John Alagía – Korg MS2000 (1, 6, 8, 13), electric guitars (1–3, 7, 8), shaker (1–3, 8), tambourine (1–3, 6, 8, 10), orchestrations (1–8, 10–13), backing vocals (2, 4, 12), keyboards (4), string arrangements (4), toy piano (6), accordion (8), jingle bells (11), synthesizers (12), samples (12), EBow (12), vibraphone (12)
- Michael Andrews – banjo, lap steel guitar (10), ukulele (10)
- Ben Peeler – lap steel guitar (5, 6, 8, 11), electric guitars (6, 11–13), banjo (6, 10), synthesizers (8), accordion (8)
- Mark Bryant – mandolin
- Tom Freund – bass (1–4, 6–8, 10–13)
- Matt Johnson – drums (1–4, 6–8, 10–13)

Bonus disc

- Josh Kelley – vocals, acoustic guitars, cabasa (2)
- Dave Yaden – acoustic piano (1, 2), Hammond organ (1, 2)
- Seth Stuart – acoustic piano (3)
- John Alagía – additional guitars (1, 2)
- Ben Peeler – lap steel guitar (1)
- Tom Freund – bass (1, 2, 4)
- Matt Johnson – drums (1, 2)

=== Production ===
- Eric Clinger – A&R
- John Alagía – producer (1–8, 10–13), mixing (1–8, 10–13)
- Josh Kelley – producer (9), engineer (9), mixing (9)
- Jeff Juliano – engineer (1–8, 10–13), mixing (1–8, 10–13)
- Eddie Miller – additional engineer (10)
- Peter Harding – assistant engineer, additional Pro Tools
- Stephen Marcussen – mastering at Marcussen Mastering (Hollywood, California)
- OK Management Company – management

Bonus disc

- John Alagía – producer (1, 2), mixing (1, 2)
- Mark Jackson – producer (3), engineer (3), mixing (3)
- Michael Baiardi – co-producer (3)
- Josh Kelley – producer (4), engineer (4), mixing (4)
- Jeff Juliano – engineer (1, 2), mixing (1, 2)

== Charts ==
Chart performance for For the Ride Home
Chart (2004)	Peak position
Australian Albums (ARIA)	79
US Billboard 200	159
