= APRA Music Awards of 1984 =

Annual Australian music awards

- Date: 1984
- Website: apra-amcos.com.au

The Australasian Performing Right Association Awards of 1984 (generally known as APRA Awards) are a series of awards held in 1984. The APRA Music Awards were presented by Australasian Performing Right Association (APRA) and the Australasian Mechanical Copyright Owners Society (AMCOS). There were no awards presented in 1983: while the inaugural ceremony occurred in 1982.

== Awards ==
Only winners are noted

Award	Winner
Special Award	"Who Can It Be Now?" (Colin Hay) by Men at Work
Special Award	"The One That You Love" (Graham Russell) by Air Supply
Special Award	"Theme from Mad Max" (Brian May) by Brian May
Most Performed Australasian Music for Film	The Man from Snowy River (Bruce Rowland) by Bruce Rowland
Most Performed Australasian Country Work	"I Was Only 19" (John Schumann) by Redgum
Most Performed Australasian Popular Work	"The Other Guy" (Graham Goble) by Little River Band
Most Performed Australasian Serious Work	Symphony No. 5 in A Minor (Carnival) (Alfred Hill)
Most Performed Foreign Work	"Hard to Say I'm Sorry" (Peter Cetera, David Foster) by Chicago

== See also ==
- Music of Australia
