= Bad Habits (Billy Field song) =

1981 single by Billy Field

Single by Billy Field

from the album Bad Habits
- B-side: "You'll Call It Love"
- Released: April 1981
- Studio: Paradise, Albert, Studios 301 (Sydney, Australia)
- Length: 3:26
- Label: WEA
- Songwriter(s): Billy Field; Tom Price
- Producer(s): Billy Field; Tom Price

Billy Field singles chronology
"Bad Habits" (1981)	"You Weren't in Love with Me" (1981)

"Bad Habits" is a song by Australian singer-songwriter Billy Field. It was released in April 1981 as his debut single and as the lead single from his first studio album of the same name. The song peaked at number four in Australia and number one in New Zealand.

== Track listing ==
7-inch single

A. "Bad Habits" – 3:26
B. "You'll Call It Love" – 4:25

== Charts ==
=== Weekly charts ===
Weekly chart performance for "Bad Habits"
Chart (1981)	Peak position
Australia (Kent Music Report)	4
New Zealand (Recorded Music NZ)	1

=== Year-end charts ===
Year-end chart performance for "Bad Habits"
Chart (1981)	Position
Australia (Kent Music Report)	36
New Zealand (Recorded Music NZ))	23
