= Only You (Josh Kelley song) =

Single by Josh Kelley

from the album Almost Honest
- Released: June 6, 2005
- Genre: Pop
- Length: 3:11
- Label: Hollywood
- Songwriters: Scott Spock, Graham Edwards, Lauren Christy, Josh Kelley
- Producer: Matt Wallace

Josh Kelley singles chronology
"Everybody Wants You" (2004)	"Only You" (2005)	"Almost Honest" (2005)

"Only You" is a song written and recorded by American pop singer Josh Kelley. It was released in June 2005 as the first single from his 2005 studio album, Almost Honest.

== Music video ==
The female love interest in the video is played by actress Katherine Heigl. The two later became a couple, having met on this video shoot, and were married on December 23, 2007. The music video was directed by Marcus Raboy.

== CD single ==
No.	Title	Writer(s)	Length
1.	"Only You" (album version)	The Matrix, Josh Kelley	3:11
2.	"Never Gonna Let You Down" (B-side)		3:48
3.	"Heartache" (B-side)		4:22
4.	"Only You" (music video)	The Matrix, Josh Kelley	3:11

== Charts ==
Chart performance for "Only You"
Chart (2005)	Peak position
Australia (ARIA)	99
US Adult Pop Airplay (Billboard)	9

== Release history ==
Release dates and formats for "Only You"
Region	Date	Format	Label(s)	Ref.
United States	August 9, 2005	Mainstream airplay	Hollywood	
