= Ebrahim Monsefi =

Iranian singer, musician and poet

Ebrahim Monsefi (in Persian: ابراهیم منصفی, 1945, Bandar Abbas – 1997) was an Iranian singer, musician and poet who died in obscurity.
