= Billy Field (singer) =

Australian singer-songwriter (born 1953)

- Born: William Bruce Field; 20 January 1953 (age 73); Wagga Wagga, New South Wales, Australia
- Origin: Sydney, New South Wales, Australia
- Genres: Jazz; pop; rock
- Occupations: Musician; record producer; studio owner
- Instruments: Vocals; bass guitar; piano; guitar
- Years active: 1967–present
- Labels: WEA/EMI; Agape/EMI; J & B; Aztec

William Bruce Field (born 20 January 1953) is an Australian singer-songwriter and multi-instrumentalist. He has run his own recording studio and has worked as a producer. His first solo album, Bad Habits (June 1981), reached No. 1 on the Kent Music Report. His top 20 hit singles are "Bad Habits" (April 1981, No. 4), "You Weren't in Love with Me" (July 1981, No. 1) and "True Love" (1982, No. 17).

== Early life ==
Billy Field was born in Wagga Wagga, New South Wales, Australia, on 20 January 1953. He grew up on Widgiewa Station, a large sheep and cattle property near the small Riverina town of Urana, and he worked there for various periods until his mid-20s. For secondary education, he attended Cranbrook School in Sydney.

== Career ==
Field replaced Chris Pokorny on bass guitar in a Sydney pop band, King Fox, formed in 1967. He also provided vocals and guitar with Dave King on lead vocals, guitar and harmonica, Paul Radcliffe on flute, vocals, guitar and Mellotron and Andy Evans on drums. They were later joined by Peter Muller on vocals, organ and piano. King Fox issued a four-track extended play, Unforgotten Dreams, on the Du Monde label in 1969 as well as a single, "I Think You're Fine", on Festival records in 1972. Following the demise of King Fox, Field played in various pub bands in Sydney during the 1970s.

=== 1980s: Solo career ===
Field's first solo album, Bad Habits, was released in June 1981 by WEA in Australia and Europe and CBS in the United States. It was arranged by Tom Price and co-produced by Field and Price. It peaked at No. 1 on the Kent Music Report, and No. 4 on the Official New Zealand Music Chart. The title track had appeared in April and it reached No. 4 on the Kent Music Report singles chart, and No. 1 on the Official New Zealand Music Chart. It is co-written by Field and Price and has been covered by other artists including David Lee Roth on his album Diamond Dave (July 2003), John Farnham/Anthony Warlow on Highlights from The Main Event (December 1998) and Jeff Duff.

His next single from the same album, "You Weren't in Love with Me", was released in July 1981 and appeared at No. 1 in Australia, No. 22 in New Zealand, and No. 67 on the UK Singles Chart (in June 1982). The track was written by Field and has also been performed by Beccy Cole and Marina Prior. At the APRA Music Awards of 1982 Field won Most Performed Australasian Popular Work for that track. As singles, both the title track to the album and "You Weren't in Love With Me" were awarded gold discs in Australia for sales of over 50,000 copies. According to the Australian musicologist, Ian McFarlane, "[Field] was one of the most popular acts on the Australian scene" in 1981, as a "husky voiced singer/piano player". The Australian Women's Weekly's Susan Moore observed, "[his] music is conducive to a bright mood. He dared to be a little different and got away with it. His breezy, swing style of music is punctuated with refined blasts of orchestration."

Field's second album, Try Biology, appeared in 1982 and provided his third Australian hit single, "True Love", which reached No. 17. The album was also produced by Price. Lisa Perry of The Canberra Times saw his performance at Queanbeyan in September that year and wrote, "He still has what it takes to entertain even the hardest of audiences. If you are in any way interested in some good jazz, interspersed with some driving rock and roll, you would have had to agree that [Field] is a unique talent." Her newspaper colleague, Karen Milliner, described how the single did not reflect his style, "[it] is a commercial number which obviously has succeeded, but it's the only one of its ilk on the album. Apart from two slow songs on side two, the rest of the tracks have that jazz and big-band sound which Field loves, lots of jazz piano, trumpets, trombones and sax... [his] gravel-edged throaty voice is ideally suited to jazz, and there's some great jazz piano and brass arrangements featured."

In November 1985, Field was a guest lead vocalist for Warren Daly's band (ex-Daly-Wilson Big Band). The Canberra Times' Michael Foster observed, "[Daly is] expected to put a tight and exciting band of accomplished musicians on the stage, and the combination with [Field] makes the prospect even more fascinating... if Field decides to demonstrate, even beyond his undoubted ability as a composer, lyricist and singer, his skills on bass, piano, drums, guitar or woodwinds." In 1989, he issued a third album, Say Yes, on the Agape label. It was produced by Field alone. The Canberra Times' Kathryn Whitfield wrote, "His voice is not one that you would describe as versatile, the music on this album does exhibit an interesting variety ranging from love ballads to the raunchy 'Blue Boogie'... This is a pleasant kind of easy-listening album, tailored for the AM radio market. It may put a smile on mum's face, but it will put the more nubile to sleep."

=== 2000s: renewed interest ===
Interest in Field's music was regenerated in November 2004 after a contestant, Courtney Murphy, performed "You Weren't in Love with Me" on the TV talent show Australian Idol. One of the judges, Ian "Dicko" Dickson, indicated that he liked it but had not heard it before. Murphy was also a guest on ABC TV's Spicks and Specks, a celebrity pop music quiz program, in 2005 and revisited his performance. This interest led to the release of a compilation album, The Best of Billy Field: You Weren't in Love with Me, (Aztec Music, 2005) on CD. Murphy's performance of the song is credited on the liner notes as the impetus for an increase in interest in the artist's back catalogue.

== Paradise Studios ==
In 1979, Field established his own recording studio in Judge Street, Woolloomooloo. Initially called 'Canteen Studios', it was later renamed 'Paradise Studios'. Paradise was used to record albums by Air Supply, Cold Chisel, INXS, Paul Kelly, Icehouse, Models, Absent Friends and the Angels.

Paradise Studios were also hired by record producer Martin Armiger to record the 1990 Australian Broadcasting Corporation double-platinum album Vince Jones & Grace Knight – Come in Spinner from the ABC miniseries Come in Spinner. The album won the ARIA Award for Best Adult Contemporary Album, peaked at No 4 on the ARIA Charts, and became the highest selling jazz album in Australian history with sales exceeding 230,000 copies. Bill Motzing and Derek Williams were arrangers and orchestral conductors for the album.

In November 2003, Paradise was re-established in Gosford.

== Discography ==
=== Studio albums ===
List of albums, with Australian chart positions
Title	Album details	Peak chart positions	
Title	Album details	AUS	NZ
Bad Habits	Released: June 1981; Label: WEA/EMI Music Australia (600092)	1	4
Try Biology	Released: November 1982; Label: WEA (600135)	21	-
Say Yes	Released: May 1989; Label: Agape Records/EMI (REV 792017, CDP 792017)	-	-
Western Light	Released: 1992; Label: Jade Records (JADCD 1033)	-	-

=== Compilation albums ===
Title	Details
Rock N Roll Memories	Released: 1989; Label: J & B Records (JB 389)
Best Of: You Weren't in Love With Me	Released: 2005; Label: Aztec Music (AVSCD002)

=== Singles ===
List of singles, with Australian chart positions
Year	Title	Peak chart positions			Certification	Album
Year	Title	AUS	NZ	UK	Certification	Album
1981	"Bad Habits"	4	1	-	AUS: Gold	Bad Habits
1981	"You Weren't in Love with Me"	1	22	67	AUS: Gold	Bad Habits
1982	"True Love"	17	-	-		Try Biology
1982	"Try Biology"	-	-	-		Try Biology
1984	"Undercover"	-	-	-		non album single
1988	"Say Yes"	-	-	-		Say Yes
1988	"Passing Thing"	-	-	-		Say Yes
1989	"Lucky Stars"	-	-	-		Say Yes

== Awards and nominations ==
=== APRA Awards ===
The APRA Awards are held in Australia and New Zealand by the Australasian Performing Right Association to recognise songwriting skills, sales and airplay performance by its members annually.

Year	Nominee / work	Award	Result
1982	"You Weren't in Love with Me"	Most Performed Australasian Popular Work	Won

=== Countdown Australian Music Awards ===
Countdown was an Australian pop music TV series on the national broadcaster ABC-TV from 1974 to 1987. It presented music awards from 1979–1987, initially in conjunction with magazine TV Week. The TV Week / Countdown Awards were a combination of popular-voted and peer-voted awards.

Year	Nominee / work	Award	Result
1981	Himself	Best Australian Songwriter	Nominated
1981	Himself	Most Popular Male Performer	Nominated
1981	Bad Habits	Best Debut Album	Nominated
