= Bad Habits (Billy Field album) =

Studio album by Billy Field
- Released: 1981
- Genre: Jazz, pop, rock
- Length: 31:14
- Producer: Billy Field, Tom Price

Billy Field chronology
Bad Habits (1981)	Try Biology (1982)

Singles from Bad Habits
- 1. "Bad Habits" Released: April 1981; 2. "You Weren't in Love with Me" Released: July 1981

Bad Habits is the debut album released by Australian artist Billy Field in 1981. It spent two weeks at the top of the Australian album charts in 1981.

David Lee Roth recorded a version of Field's "Baby I'm Easy" for his 1986 debut solo album Eat 'Em and Smile; later, he also recorded a version of the album's title track for his 2003 album "Diamond Dave".

== Track listing ==
=== Side one ===
1. "Bad Habits" – 3:26
2. "Good Golly Me" – 2:58
3. "You Weren't in Love with Me" – 3:24
4. "Baby I'm Easy" – 2:16
5. "Never Be Blue" – 2:41

=== Side two ===
1. "Since I Found Out" – 3:42
2. "You'll Call It Love" – 4:25
3. "Celebrity Lane" – 2:41
4. "Single Man" – 2:37
5. "If I Was a Millionaire" – 3:04

== Charts ==
=== Weekly charts ===
Chart (1981)	Peak position
Australian Albums (Kent Music Report)	1
New Zealand Albums (RMNZ)	4

=== Year-end charts ===
Chart (1981)	Position
New Zealand Albums (RMNZ)	40
