= The Hombres =

American garage rock band

- Origin: Memphis, Tennessee, United States
- Genres: Garage rock
- Years active: 1966–1969
- Labels: Verve Forecast
- Past members: Jerry Masters; Gary McEwen; B.B. Cunningham Jr.(deceased); John Hunter (deceased)

The Hombres were an American garage rock band from Memphis, Tennessee, known primarily for the 1967 single, "Let It Out (Let It All Hang Out)".

== Origins ==
Formed in 1966, The Hombres comprised Jerry Lee Masters (leader and bass player); Gary Wayne McEwen on guitar; B. B. Cunningham, Jr. (died October 14, 2012), on lead vocals and electronic organ; and John Will Hunter (died February 1976) on drums.

== Greatest hit ==
Written by Masters, Hunter, McEwen and Cunningham and released on Verve Forecast Records, "Let It Out (Let It All Hang Out)" hit number 12 in 1967, and was revived on the soundtrack of the 2005 Cameron Crowe film, Elizabethtown. On WLS, The Box Tops' "The Letter" (with Bill Cunningham) and The Hombres' "Let It Out" (with Bill Cunningham's brother B.B. Cunningham Jr.) were respectively number one and number two for two weeks in October 1967.

The song's spoken introduction – "A preachment, dear friends, you are about to receive on John Barleycorn, nicotine and the temptations of Eve" – dates to the 1947 novelty recording, "Cigareets, Whuskey and Wild, Wild Women", by Red Ingle and His Natural Seven.

== Musical legacy ==
A 1967 version of the song by disc jockey Barney Pip was included on the Pebbles, Volume 7 compilation (1994).

The original "Let It Out" was included in the 1972 compilation album, Nuggets: Original Artyfacts from the First Psychedelic Era.

The track has been used in a U.S. advertising campaign for Foster's Lager.

The song was covered by Jonathan King in 1969 and also appears on his 1989 compilation album, The Butterfly That Stamped.

A version of "Let It Out" was recorded by The Nails in the mid-1980s.

The song was sampled in "Wear Your Love Like Heaven" by Definition of Sound (1991), "The Humblest Start" by LP&JC (2010), and "Let It All Hang Out" by Matlock (2022).

The song appears on John Mellencamp's 1989 album, Big Daddy.

The song appears on David Lee Roth's 2003 album, Diamond Dave.

B.B. Cunningham rerecorded "Let It Out" (with new lyrics) for his 2003 solo album, Hangin In.

== Band members ==
Hunter committed suicide with a gun in February 1976.

B. B. Cunningham, Jr. was shot and killed on October 14, 2012, while employed as a security guard in Memphis, Tennessee.

== Discography ==
=== Album ===
- Let It Out (Let It All Hang Out) (1967) Verve Forecast – FTS-3036 [Recorded in February and August 1967]

Track listing

1. "Let It Out (Let It All Hang Out)" (B. B. Cunningham, Jr.) - 2:05
2. "Little 2 + 2" (Cunningham, Jerry Lee Masters, John Will Hunter, Gary Wayne McEwen) - 1:40
3. "So Sad" (Don Everly) - 3:47
4. "Gloria" (Van Morrison) - 5:43
5. "Am I High" (Cunningham, Masters, Hunter, McEwen) - 2:49
6. "Mau Mau Mau" (Cunningham, Masters, Hunter, McEwen) - 2:15
7. "This Little Girl" (Cunningham, Masters, Hunter, McEwen) - 1:58
8. "Sorry 'Bout That" (McEwen, Stanley Kessler) - 2:15
9. "Ya Ya" (Clarence Lewis, Lee Dorsey, Morgan Robinson) - 3:11
10. "Hey Little Girl" (Cunningham, Masters, Hunter, McEwen) - 1:46
11. "It's a Gas" (Cunningham, Masters, Hunter, McEwen) - 1:56

Technical staff

- Producer – Huey P. Meaux
- Engineer – G. D. Shelby, Stanley Kessler, Val Valentin

=== Singles ===
- 1967: "Let It All Hang Out" / "Go Girl, Go" – (Cunningham; Masters, Hunter, McEwen), Verve Forecast KF 5058 – No. 12 US, No. 16 AUS; No. 25 CAN
- 1967: "It's a Gas" / "Am I High" – Verve Forecast KF 5076
- 1968: "The Prodigal" / "Mau Mau Mau" – Verve Forecast KF 5083
- 1968: "Take My Overwhelming Love (and Cram It Up Your Heart)" / "Pumkin Man" – Verve Forecast KF 5093
- 1969: "If This Ain't Loving You Baby (It'll Have to Do Till I Get Some Sleep)" / "You Made Me What I Am" – Sun 1104
