= Let It Out (Let It All Hang Out) =

1967 song by The Hombres

Single by The Hombres

from the album Let It Out (Let It All Hang Out)
- B-side: "Go Girl, Go"
- Released: 1967
- Recorded: 1967
- Genre: Southern rock; garage rock
- Length: 2:06
- Label: Verve Forecast
- Songwriter: B. B. Cunningham
- Producer: Huey P. Meaux

The Hombres singles chronology
| "Hey, Little Girl" (1966) | "Let It Out (Let It All Hang Out)" (1967) | "It's a Gas" (1967) |

"Let It Out (Let It All Hang Out)" is a 1967 song by the Hombres and the title track of their album of the same name. It is, according to AllMusic journalist Stewart Mason, a "deadpan southern-fried parody" of Bob Dylan's "Subterranean Homesick Blues".

== Background ==
The song's spoken intro – "A preachment, dear friends, you are about to receive on John Barleycorn, nicotine and the temptations of Eve" – dates to the 1947 novelty recording "Cigareetes, Whuskey and Wild, Wild Women" by Red Ingle and His Natural Seven, and is followed by a raspberry.

== "Go Girl, Go" ==
The song's B-side, "Go Girl, Go", has the singer complaining about having to "stand in line" to see his girlfriend now that she is a "hip-swingin', fringe-slingin' Watusi go go girl". It is featured in the compilation album Essential Pebbles, Volume 1, where it is incorrectly titled "Go Go Girl" in the track listing, and attributed to "unknown artist".

== Cover versions ==
"Let It All Hang Out"

Single by Jonathan King
- B-side: "Colloquial Sex"
- Released: 1969
- Recorded: 1969
- Length: 2:10
- Label: Decca
- Songwriter: B. B. Cunningham
- Producer: Jonathan King

- In 1970, Jonathan King reached number 26 in the UK Singles Chart with his rendition.
- In 1984, the Nails included it on their debut album Mood Swing.
- In 1988, Scrawl released it (with amended lyrics) on their album He's Drunk.
- In 1989, John Cougar Mellencamp recorded it for his Big Daddy LP. A music video featured Sports Illustrated "swimsuit issue" cover model Ashley Richardson.
- In 2003, David Lee Roth included a cover version on his Diamond Dave album, as did Appleton, consisting of former members of All Saints Nicole and Natalie Appleton, who recorded a cover for the B-side of their single "Everything Eventually".

== Uses in popular culture ==
- One of the earliest uses of the song was when it was sampled in 1968 by Dickie Goodman for his single "Washington Uptight."
- It was sampled by the London-based dance-music act Definition of Sound on their top 20 hit "Wear Your Love Like Heaven", in 1991.
- It was featured on the 1998 box set Nuggets: Original Artyfacts from the First Psychedelic Era, 1965–1968.
- "Let It All Hang Out" was included on the soundtrack of the 2005 film Elizabethtown.
- Foster's Lager used it in a 2006 advertisement for Foster's Twist.
- "Let It All Hang Out" was included on the soundtrack of the 2023 TV series White House Plumbers.

== Chart performance ==
| Artist | Billboard Hot 100 | UK Singles Chart | Dutch Top 40 |
|---|---|---|---|
| The Hombres | 12 | - | - |
| Jonathan King | - | 26 | 28 |
