= Josh Kelley =

American musician (born 1980)

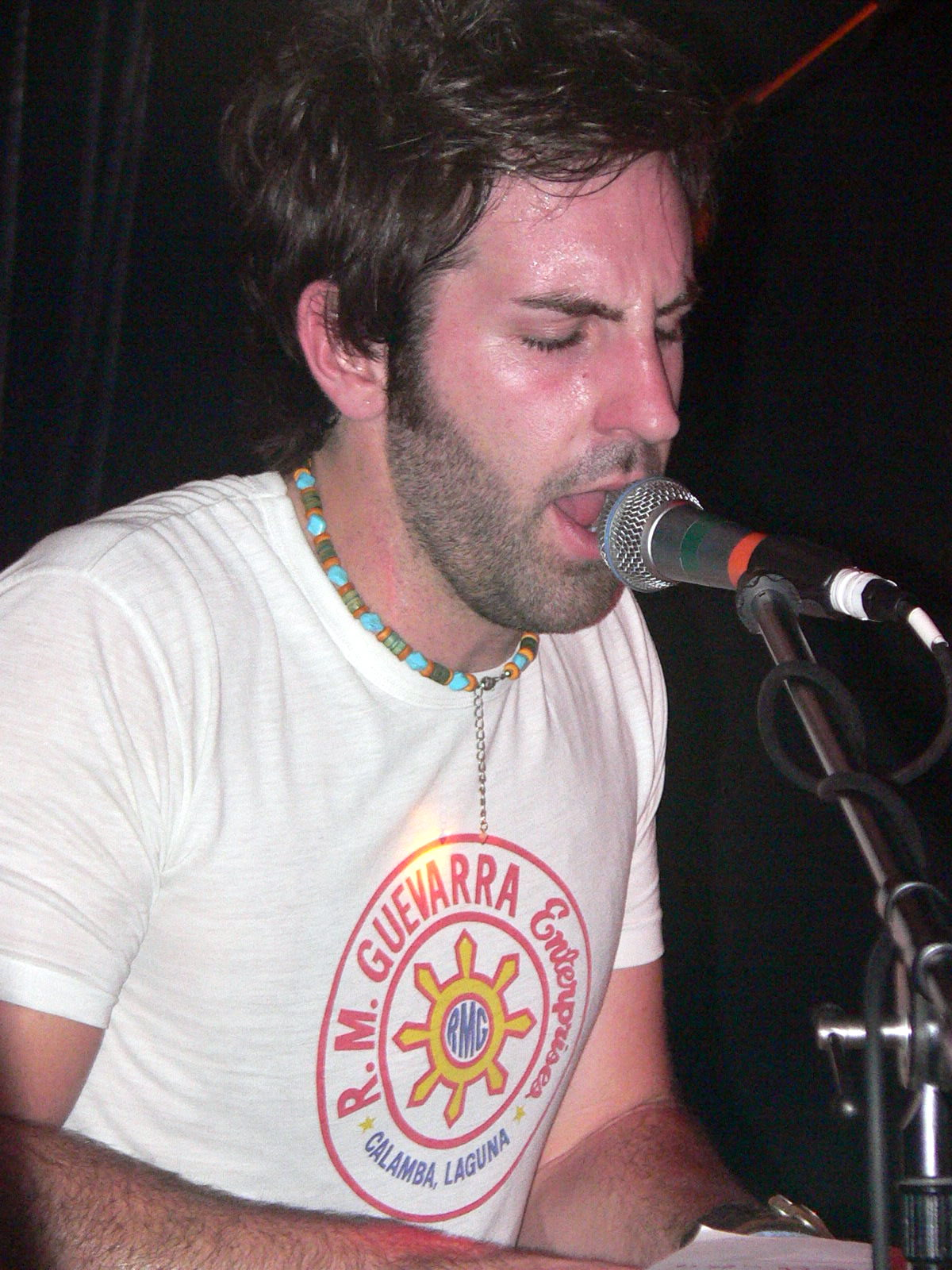
- Kelley performing in 2007

Background information
- Born: Joshua Bishop Kelley; January 30, 1980 (age 46); Augusta, Georgia, U.S.
- Origin: Evans, Georgia, U.S.
- Genres: Pop rock; blues rock; country
- Occupations: Singer-songwriter; musician
- Instruments: Vocals; guitar; keyboards; trombone
- Years active: 2001–present
- Labels: DNK; Hollywood; Threshold; MCA Nashville
- Spouse: Katherine Heigl (m. 2007)
- Website: JoshKelley.com

Joshua Bishop Kelley (born January 30, 1980) is an American musician and singer-songwriter. Kelley has recorded for Hollywood Records, Threshold Records and DNK Records as a pop rock artist. His songs "Amazing" and "Only You" reached the top ten on the Billboard Adult Top 40 chart.

In 2010, Kelley signed to MCA Nashville and began a country music career. His debut country single, "Georgia Clay", reached the top 20 on the Hot Country Songs charts.

== Early life ==
Kelley was born in Augusta, Georgia, to Dr. John W. Kelley, a cardiologist, and Gayle Kelley. Kelley began his musical career at the age of 11. His younger brother, Charles Kelley, is a musician and singer in the country trio Lady A.

== Music career ==
Kelley released his independent album, Changing Faces, in 2001 and signed with Hollywood Records in 2002. Working with John Alagia as his record producer, Kelley released the album, For the Ride Home, on June 3, 2003.

In November 2009, Kelley signed with MCA Nashville and began recording his first country album in 2010.

Kelley released the album New Lane Road in 2016.

=== Concert tours ===
Supporting

- Revolution Tour with Miranda Lambert (2011)
- Own the Night Tour with Lady A (2011)
- The Driver Tour with Charles Kelley (2016)

== Personal life ==
Kelley met actress Katherine Heigl in spring 2005 when she appeared in his music video "Only You". One year later, in June 2006, they became engaged.

During a taping of Live With Regis and Kelly, Heigl stated that she and Kelley chose to wait until marriage before living together, saying, "I think I just wanted to save something for the actual marriage... I wanted there to be something to make the actual marriage different than the dating or the courtship."

In 2009, the couple adopted a South Korean baby girl, naming her Nancy Leigh, after Heigl's mother and her adopted, Korean-born older sister, respectively. Nancy Leigh's nickname is Naleigh. Nancy Leigh was born with a congenital heart defect that was repaired with open heart surgery before she left South Korea. Kelley and Heigl adopted a second daughter, Adalaide Marie Hope, in April 2012.

In addition to their two daughters, Josh Kelley and Katherine Heigl have a son, Joshua Bishop Kelley Jr., born December 20, 2016.

Kelley, Heigl, and their children live in Oakley, Utah.

== Discography ==
=== Studio albums ===
Title	Album details	Peak chart positions					
Title	Album details	US	US Heat	US Indie	US Country	US Folk	AUS
For the Ride Home	Release date: June 3, 2003; Label: Hollywood	159	5	—	—	—	79
Almost Honest	Release date: August 23, 2005; Label: Hollywood	114	1	—	—	—	—
Just Say the Word	Release date: June 6, 2006; Label: Threshold	—	—	—	—	—	—
Special Company	Release date: February 5, 2008; Label: DNK	—	7	27	—	—	—
Backwoods	Release date: August 20, 2008; Label: DNK	—	19	—	—	—	—
To Remember	Release date: September 29, 2008; Label: DNK	—	11	—	—	—	—
Georgia Clay	Release date: March 22, 2011; Label: MCA Nashville	92	—	—	16	—	—
New Lane Road	Release date: April 22, 2016; Label: Sugar Hill	—	—	—	29	13	—
My Baby & The Band	Release date: November 2020	—	—	—	—	—	—
"—" denotes releases that did not chart

=== Extended plays ===
Title	EP details
Josh Kelley Live Session EP	Release date: August 2, 2005; Label: Hollywood
Georgia Clay	Release date: November 30, 2010; Label: MCA Nashville

=== Singles ===
Year	Title	Peak chart positions					Album
Year	Title	US	US AC	US Adult	US Country	AUS	Album
2003	"Amazing"	79	—	8	—	61	For the Ride Home
2004	"Everybody Wants You"	—	—	24	—	—	For the Ride Home
2005	"Only You"	—	—	9	—	99	Almost Honest
2005	"Almost Honest"	—	—	29	—	—	Almost Honest
2006	"Get with It"	—	—	—	—	—	—N/a
2006	"Pop Game"	—	—	—	—	—	Just Say the Word
2006	"Just Say the Word"	—	—	—	—	—	Just Say the Word
2008	"Unfair"	—	—	—	—	—	Special Company
2009	"To Remember"	—	27	—	—	—	To Remember
2010	"Georgia Clay"	87	—	—	17	—	Georgia Clay
2011	"Gone Like That"	—	—	—	53	—	Georgia Clay
2014	"Mandolin Rain"	—	—	—	—	—	—N/a
"—" denotes releases that did not chart

=== Guest singles ===
Year	Single	Artist	Album
2017	"Young Americans"	Colt Ford (with Charles Kelley)	Love Hope Faith

=== Other contributions ===
Year	Song	Album
2004	"To Make You Feel My Love"	A Cinderella Story (soundtrack)
2004	"Everybody Wants You"	The Prince & Me (soundtrack)
2004	"Share This Day"	Mickey's Twice Upon a Christmas (soundtrack)
2004	"Amazing"	Raising Helen (soundtrack)
2005	"You Are the Woman"	Herbie: Fully Loaded (soundtrack)
2005	"Crazy Little Thing Called Love"	Killer Queen: A Tribute to Queen
2006	"Lover Come Up"	My Super Ex-Girlfriend (soundtrack)
2006	"Sunset Lover"	John Tucker Must Die (soundtrack)
2006	"Feels Like Home"	Brother Bear 2 (soundtrack)
2006	"Welcome to This Day (Reprise)"	Brother Bear 2 (soundtrack)
2006	"You're a Part of Everything"	Candles on Bay Street (soundtrack)
2008	"Unfair"	27 Dresses (soundtrack)
2008	"You're a Part of Everything"	Picture This (soundtrack)
2009	"Under the Covers"	The Ugly Truth (soundtrack)
2012	"The Best of Me"	Act of Valor (soundtrack)

=== Music videos ===
Year	Video	Director
2004	"Everybody Wants You"	Elliott Lester
2005	"Only You"	Marcus Raboy
2010	"Georgia Clay"	Wes Edwards
2011	"Gone Like That"	Adam Boatman
2012	"Naleigh Moon"	Katherine Heigl
2016	"It's Your Move"	Katherine Heigl
2017	"Young Americans" (with Colt Ford & Charles Kelley)	Wayne Miller
