= Amazing (Josh Kelley song) =

Single by Josh Kelley

from the album For the Ride Home
- B-side: "Amen"; "Solid Ground"; "Amazing" (Acoustic Version)
- Released: March 3, 2003
- Genre: Pop
- Length: 3:50
- Label: Hollywood
- Songwriter(s): Josh Kelley
- Producer(s): John Alagía

Josh Kelley singles chronology
"Amazing" (2003)	"Everybody Wants You" (2004)

"Amazing" is the debut single by American singer-songwriter Josh Kelley, penned solely by him and taken from his debut studio album For the Ride Home (2003). It was produced by John Alagía and was serviced to radio stations on March 3, 2003, via Hollywood Records.

The track is Kelley's biggest success to date, peaking at number eight on the Adult Pop Airplay chart and number 79 on the Billboard Hot 100. It also became a minor success in Australia.

== Background ==
Josh Kelley was discovered, ironically enough, through Napster, where he'd upload his songs. Hollywood Records A&R rep Eric Clinger later met Kelley this way, as he was impressed by his music. With that, Clinger signed Kelley onto the Hollywood label in 2002.

== Composition ==
"Amazing" is performed in the key of A major with a tempo of 97 beats per minute.

== Reception ==
=== Critical reception ===
Mike Trias of Radio & Records described the track as a "catchy, upbeat" song in which "Kelley proclaims his affection for an amazing lady."

=== Commercial reception ===
"Amazing" debuted on the Billboard Adult Top 40 Tracks chart the week of April 19, 2003, at number 38, the highest debut of the week. It reached a peak position of number eight on September 6, 2003, becoming Kelley's first top ten hit on the chart and most successful to date. It lasted 34 weeks in total. It was the last time a male artist had their debut single reach the top ten on Adult Top 40 until Andy Grammer's "Keep Your Head Up" in 2011. In September 2003, the track received a Broadcast Data Systems Spin Award for 50,000 confirmed airplay spins. "Amazing" would receive another Spin Award in March 2004, this time for 100,000 confirmed airplay spins.

== Use in other media ==
"Amazing" was used in the 2004 film Raising Helen and in the television series Smallville.

== Track listings and formats ==
US CD single

1. "Amazing" – 3:50
2. "Amen" – 4:27

Australian CD single

1. "Amazing"
2. "Amen"
3. "Amazing" (Acoustic Version)
4. "Solid Ground"

== Charts ==
=== Weekly charts ===
Chart (2003)	Peak position
Australia (ARIA)	61
US Billboard Hot 100	79
US Adult Pop Airplay (Billboard)	8
US CHR/Pop (Radio & Records)	43
US Hot AC (Radio & Records)	8

=== Year-end charts ===
Chart (2003)	Position
US Adult Top 40 (Billboard)	17
US Hot AC (Radio & Records)	27
US Triple A (Radio & Records)	99

== Release history ==
Release dates and format(s) for "Amazing"
Region	Date	Format(s)	Label(s)	Ref.
United States	March 3, 2003	Hot adult contemporary; Triple-A radio	Hollywood	
United States	September 8, 2003	Contemporary hit radio	Hollywood	
