= Seven Keys (company) =

Seven Keys Group Pty. Ltd.
- Industry: Film distribution
- Founded: 1969; 57 years ago
- Founder: Andrew Gaty
- Defunct: 1988
- Parent: Perry Corporation
- Subsidiaries: Seven Keys Video

Seven Keys Group Pty. Ltd. was an Australian film distribution company founded in 1969 by Andrew Gaty. In 1975, it became the largest independent institution of its kind in that country, outgrossing every local unit of Hollywood's studios there.

Its library contained titles from ITC Entertainment, RSO and New Line Cinema among others.

In 1983, the company launched its own home video division, Seven Keys Video, to distribute several titles from its movie library to the niche Australian market.

In 1985, Gaty sold the company to the Perry Corporation. In December of that same year, the company saw the release of Nelvana's The Care Bears Movie (distributed in the United States by The Samuel Goldwyn Company). The company ends up being liquidated in 1988 after a string of failures in the Australian box office, as well as poor video sales.

The company also had a branch in the United Kingdom during the 1970s.

== Sources ==
- "Biography of Andrew Gaty". Diamond Dead. AG Productions. Archived from the original on 11 April 2004.
