= Corroboree (ballet) =

1940 Australian ballet

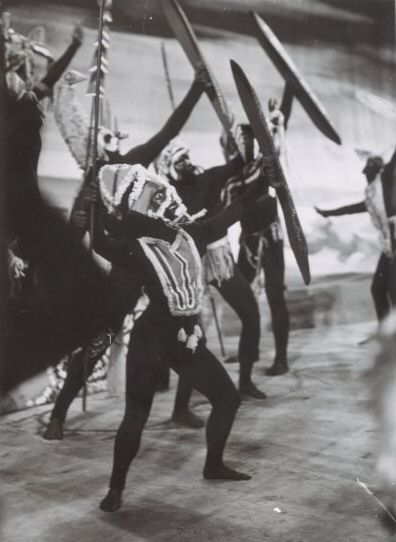
1950 ballet performance of John Antill's Corroboree.

Corroboree is a ballet written by Australian composer John Antill in the early 1940s. The first full version of the score was completed in 1944 and it was first performed as a concert suite in 1946. On 3 July 1950 it was performed as a ballet, at the Empire Theatre in Sydney, choreographed by Rex Reid, with dancers of the Melbourne-based National Theatre Ballet.

Wildly successful and seen as a national "coming-of-age", the ballet was performed again with new choreography by American-born dancer, choreographer and writer Beth Dean in 1954. Notably, Dean and her Australian husband, Victor Carell, had spent several months in remote outback Australia researching Aboriginal ceremonies, costumes and dance, upon which Dean's version was based. In this first production, Dean danced the role of the Initiate herself.

Many of the costumes and props for this version of the ballet are held by the National Museum of Australia. The music manuscript is held by the State Library of New South Wales.

== See also ==
- Corroboree
- Bullroarer
