= Tom Price (musician) =

American songwriter

- Born: Thomas Shelton Price; January 28, 1956 (age 70); New York City
- Occupations: Composer, conductor, producer, public speaker, author

Tom Price (born January 28, 1956) is an Australian and American songwriter, conductor, and musical director best known for his work in choral and orchestral music.

== Biography ==
As director of the international choir, The Voices of Bahá, he has directed public concerts in more than forty countries over the past twenty-five years, including performances in Carnegie Hall in New York, the Mozart Concert House in Vienna, the Tchaikovsky Concert Hall in Moscow and dozens of other fine auditoriums throughout the world. Price has conducted such orchestras as The Warsaw Philharmonic, The Czech National Symphony, The Budapest Symphony, the Slovak Radio Symphony Orchestra, The Maly Moscow Symphony, and others. For fourteen years, he was musical director of the Sydney Baháʼí Temple Choir in Australia, and from 1989 to 1996 was musical director at the Baháʼí House of Worship in Wilmette, Illinois.

In 1986 he collaborated with Indian composer Ravi Shankar in combining Indian and western musical elements for the opening and dedication of the Baháʼí House of Worship in New Delhi. He was the director of the 420-voice choir and 90-piece symphony orchestra for the second Baháʼí World Congress in New York in 1992. Price studied music composition at the University of Sydney in Australia, where he lived for 18 years, working as a composer, arranger and conductor of music for film, television and commercial recordings. He was responsible for several hit recordings in the pop and jazz fields in Australia, including producing and co-writing the double-platinum Bad Habits by singer Billy Field, which was the largest selling album in Australia in 1981. In 1983 he won the Gold Prize in songwriting at the 12th Tokyo Music Festival. Since moving to the United States in 1988, he has produced several fine choral, gospel and jazz recordings. He is currently writing a book on the Science of Spirituality, and heads the independent recording label Claire Vision Productions in Tennessee.

Price is a member of the Baháʼí Faith. His widely noted talks on subjects ranging from 'the harmony of science and religion' to 'the transformation of the world', have been presented to diverse audiences across Europe, the USA, New Zealand and Australia.

== Family ==
Price is the son of Hollywood screen actor John Shelton, the grandnephew of film director Edward Ludwig, the nephew of film producer Julian Ludwig, the cousin of film producer Tony Ludwig, the grandson of creationist and noted Seventh-day Adventist George McCready Price and the father of jazz and rock singer Rachael Price.

== Discography ==
- Bad Habits – Billy Field (1981) Producer & Songwriter ISBN 1-876766-26-3
- Try Biology – Billy Field (1983) Producer & Songwriter
- I'm Easy – Recorded by David Lee Roth (1986) Songwriter
- Songs of the Ancient Beauty (1991) Composer, Conductor & Producer
- We Have Come to Sing Praises (1993) Producer
- Music from the Second Baháʼí World Congress (1994) Composer & Conductor
- Songs of the Ancient Beauty Volume 2 (1995) Composer, Conductor & Producer
- Bad Habits – Recorded by David Lee Roth (1996) Songwriter
- Lift Up Your Voices and Sing Volume 1 (1997) Producer
- Lift Up Your Voices and Sing Volume 2 (1997) Producer
- Lift Up Your Voices and Sing Volume 3 (1997) Producer
- The Voices of Bahá in Concert (2000) Composer, Conductor & Producer
- The Voices of Bahá in Carnegie Hall (2002) Composer, Conductor & Producer
- Dedicated to You – Rachael Price (2003) Producer
- Dylana Jenson & the London Symphony Orchestra - Shostakovitch and Barber Violin Concertos – (2008) Producer
- Rachael Price & the Tennessee Terraplanes (2008) Producer
- The Good Hours - Rachael Price (2008) Producer
- Lucho Gatica - Historia de un Amor (2013) Project Director
- Sea of Mystery – Sonbol Taefi & the Czech National Symphony Orchestra (2013) Conductor & Producer
