= John Antill =

Australian composer

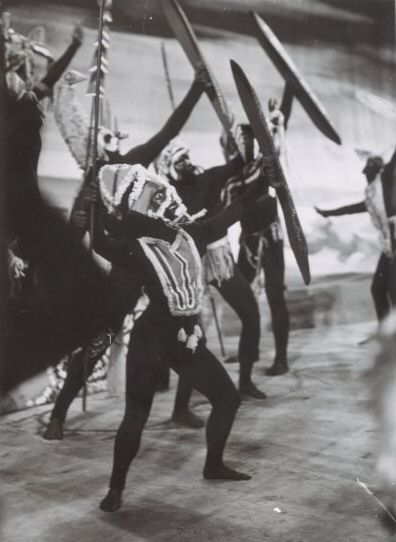
1950 ballet performance of Antill's best-known work, Corroboree

John Henry Antill, CMG, OBE (8 April 1904 – 29 December 1986) was an Australian composer best known for his ballet Corroboree.

== Biography ==
Antill was born in Sydney in 1904, and was educated and trained in music at Trinity Grammar School, Sydney and St Andrew's Cathedral School. Upon leaving school in 1920, he was apprenticed to the New South Wales Government Railways. He left the railways five years later to study full-time at the New South Wales Conservatorium of Music under Alfred Hill. After graduation, he played in both the NSW State Orchestra and the Sydney Symphony Orchestra, and, from 1932 to 1934, he toured with the J. C. Williamson Imperial Opera Company as a tenor and a rehearsal conductor.

In 1936, he became assistant Music Editor with the Australian Broadcasting Commission (ABC). He remained with the ABC until his retirement in 1968, having taken up the position of ABC Federal Music Editor in the meantime.

His most famous work, Corroboree, was first performed as a concert suite in 1946, conducted by Eugene Goossens. He based his composition on a real corroboree, which he witnessed in 1913 at La Perouse in Sydney. He had intended the work as a ballet, but it was not performed as such until 1950.

The 1950 ballet premiere, choreographed by Rex Reid, of this work was hailed as a "coming-of-age" milestone in Australian cultural life, although to modern eyes it appears a quaint and disconcerting period piece reflecting dated views of indigenous Australia. A new version of the ballet, performed in 1954, was choreographed by American-born dancer, choreographer and writer Beth Dean who, with her Australian husband Victor Carell, spent eight months in parts of central and northern Australia to capture a more authentic understanding. The National Museum of Australia holds a large collection of costumes, props and ephemera from the Dean production. Dean and Carell also wrote a biography of John Antill titled Gentle Genius, published in 1987.

In 1971, Antill was appointed an Officer (OBE) of the Order of the British Empire for services to Australian music. In the 1981 Birthday Honours, he was made a Companion of the Order of St Michael and St George (CMG). In 1985, the year before his death, he received an Honorary Doctorate in Creative Arts from the University of Wollongong.
