= The Japanese Singles 1978–1984 =

Box set by Van Halen
- Released: November 1, 2019
- Recorded: 1978–1984
- Studios: Sunset Sound Recorders, Hollywood; 5150 Studios, Studio City
- Genres: Hard rock; heavy metal; glam metal
- Length: 1:25:41
- Labels: Warner Bros.; Rhino
- Producer: Ted Templeman

Van Halen chronology
Tokyo Dome Live in Concert (2015)	The Japanese Singles 1978–1984 (2019)	The Collection 1978–1984 (2023)

Music video
- The Japanese Singles 1978–1984 official trailer on YouTube

The Japanese Singles 1978–1984 (日本盤シングルズ 1978-1984, Nihon-ban Shinguruzu 1978–1984) is a box set by American hard rock band Van Halen, released by Warner Records and Rhino Entertainment on November 1, 2019, and by Warner Music Japan on April 15, 2020. The box set contains reprints of the original 7" vinyl singles released in Japan from 1978 to 1984.

== Track listing ==
All tracks are written by Edward Van Halen, Alex Van Halen, David Lee Roth, and Michael Anthony, except where noted.

=== Disc 1: "You Really Got Me" (1978) ===
Side one
No.	Title	Writer(s)	Japanese title	Length
1.	"You Really Got Me" (The Kinks cover)	Ray Davies	ユー・リアリー・ガット・ミー
Total length:				2:36

Side two
No.	Title	Japanese title	Length
1.	"Atomic Punk"	アトミック・パンク
Total length:			3:00

=== Disc 2: "Ain't Talkin' 'bout Love" (1978) ===
Side one
No.	Title	Japanese title	Length
1.	"Ain't Talkin' 'bout Love"	叶わぬ賭け; Kanawanukake ("An Unfulfilled Bet")
Total length:			3:47

Side two
No.	Title	Japanese title	Length
1.	"Runnin' with the Devil"	悪魔のハイウェイ; Akuma no Haiuei ("The Devil's Highway")
Total length:			3:22

=== Disc 3: "On Fire" (1978) ===
Side one
No.	Title	Japanese title	Length
1.	"On Fire"	炎の叫び; Honō no Sakebi ("The Scream of Fire")
Total length:			3:01

Side two
No.	Title	Japanese title	Length
1.	"Jamie's Cryin'"	ジェイミーの涙; Jeimī no Namida ("Jamie's Tears")
Total length:			3:30

=== Disc 4: "Dance the Night Away" (1979) ===
Side one
No.	Title	Japanese title	Length
1.	"Dance the Night Away"	踊り明かそう; Odori Akasō
Total length:			3:07

Side two
No.	Title	Japanese title	Length
1.	"Spanish Fly"	スパニッシュ・フライ
Total length:			0:59

=== Disc 5: "Somebody Get Me a Doctor" (1979) ===
Side one
No.	Title	Japanese title	Length
1.	"Somebody Get Me a Doctor"	必殺のハード・ラヴ; Hissatsu no Hādo Ravu ("Deadly Hard Love")
Total length:			2:53

Side two
No.	Title	Japanese title	Length
1.	"Women in Love..."	ウィメン・イン・ラヴ…
Total length:			4:07

=== Disc 6: "And the Cradle Will Rock..." (1980) ===
Side one
No.	Title	Japanese title	Length
1.	"And the Cradle Will Rock..."	ロックン・ロール・ベイビー; Rokkun Rōru Beibī ("Rock and Roll Baby")
Total length:			3:31

Side two
No.	Title	Japanese title	Length
1.	"Could This Be Magic?"	戦慄の悪夢; Senritsu no Akumu ("A Terrifying Nightmare")
Total length:			3:08

=== Disc 7: "Unchained" (1981) ===
Side one
No.	Title	Japanese title	Length
1.	"Unchained"	アンチェインド
Total length:			3:27

Side two
No.	Title	Japanese title	Length
1.	"So This Is Love?"	これが愛だって; Kore ga Ai Datte
Total length:			3:05

=== Disc 8: "(Oh) Pretty Woman" (1982) ===
Side one
No.	Title	Writer(s)	Japanese title	Length
1.	"(Oh) Pretty Woman" (Roy Orbison cover)	Roy Orbison; Bill Dees	プリティ・ウーマン
Total length:				2:55

Side two
No.	Title	Writer(s)	Japanese title	Length
1.	"Happy Trails" (Roy Rogers and Dale Evans cover)	Dale Evans	ハッピー・トレイルズ
Total length:				1:03

=== Disc 9: "Dancing in the Street" (1982) ===
Side one
No.	Title	Writer(s)	Japanese title	Length
1.	"Dancing in the Street" (Martha and the Vandellas cover)	Marvin Gaye; William "Mickey" Stevenson; Ivy Jo Hunter	ダンシング・イン・ザ・ストリート
Total length:				3:42

Side two
No.	Title	Japanese title	Length
1.	"The Full Bug"	ザ・フル・バグ
Total length:			3:18

=== Disc 10: "Jump" (1984) ===
Side one
No.	Title	Japanese title	Length
1.	"Jump"	ジャンプ
Total length:			4:04

Side two
No.	Title	Japanese title	Length
1.	"House of Pain"	ハウス・オブ・ペイン
Total length:			3:18

=== Disc 11: "I'll Wait" (1984) ===
Side one
No.	Title	Writer(s)	Japanese title	Length
1.	"I'll Wait"	E. Van Halen; A. Van Halen; Roth; Anthony; Michael McDonald	ウェイト ("Wait")
Total length:				4:11

Side two
No.	Title	Japanese title	Length
1.	"Girl Gone Bad"	ガール・ゴーン・バッド
Total length:			4:33

=== Disc 12: "Panama" (1984) ===
Side one
No.	Title	Japanese title	Length
1.	"Panama"	パナマ
Total length:			3:31

Side two
No.	Title	Japanese title	Length
1.	"Drop Dead Legs"	ドロップ・デッド・レッグス
Total length:			4:13

=== Disc 13: "Hot for Teacher" (1984) ===
Side one
No.	Title	Japanese title	Length
1.	"Hot for Teacher"	ホット・フォー・ティーチャー
Total length:			3:58

Side two
No.	Title	Japanese title	Length
1.	"Little Dreamer"	リトル・ドリーマー
Total length:			3:22

== Personnel ==
- David Lee Roth – lead vocals
- Eddie Van Halen – guitar, keyboard, backing vocals
- Michael Anthony – bass, backing vocals
- Alex Van Halen – drums and percussion
