= Guitar Hero: Van Halen =

2009 video game

- Developer: Underground Development (Note: Ported to PlayStation 2 and Wii by Budcat Creations)
- Publisher: Activision
- Series: Guitar Hero
- Platforms: PlayStation 2, PlayStation 3, Wii, Xbox 360
- Release: NA: December 22, 2009; AU: February 17, 2010; EU: February 19, 2010
- Genre: Rhythm
- Modes: Single-player, multiplayer

Guitar Hero: Van Halen is a 2009 rhythm game developed by Underground Development and published by Activision. It is the tenth installment in the Guitar Hero series and the third to focus on the career and songs of one rock band, Van Halen, following Guitar Hero: Aerosmith (2008) and Guitar Hero: Metallica (2009). The game was released in retail for the PlayStation 2, PlayStation 3, Xbox 360, and Wii systems on December 22, 2009, in North America, and in February 2010 for PAL regions. However, as part of a promotion with Guitar Hero 5 (2009), the game was shipped to Guitar Hero 5 purchasers in North America prior to its retail release. The game features 28 songs from Van Halen along with 19 additional songs from selected artists that have been inspired by the group. The gameplay UI from Guitar Hero: Metallica was carried over.

The game has received mostly mixed reviews from critics, most of which consider the game's quality to be greatly inferior to its predecessor, Guitar Hero: Metallica, and other games of the series. The reviewers criticized the lack of former Van Halen members Michael Anthony, Gary Cherone, and Sammy Hagar; the limited tracks selected from Van Halen's discography; the selection of other tracks included in the game; and the general lack of features introduced in the previous band-centric games and Guitar Hero 5.

== Gameplay ==
Guitar Hero: Van Halen is similar to the preceding band-centric game, Guitar Hero: Metallica, featuring support for four players in a single band on lead and bass guitar, drums, and vocals. The game is based on the engine originating from Guitar Hero World Tour, and thus does not feature the additions that are present in Guitar Hero 5, such as drop-in/drop-out play.

Only the current members of the band—Eddie Van Halen, David Lee Roth, Alex Van Halen and Wolfgang Van Halen—are playable avatars in the game for the Van Halen songs; former band members Sammy Hagar, Gary Cherone and Michael Anthony are not included. The band appear as they did in 2009 but, by completing challenges in the game, players can unlock their older appearances from the "spandex era […] with the big hair and tight pants". Despite having not been born during this period of the band's history, Wolfgang Van Halen's avatar has a retro outfit copied from the dice-shirt-and-patchwork-jeans getup worn by his father in the video for "Panama".

A demo of the game was released to Xbox Live on December 9, 2009, featuring two Van Halen songs, "Eruption" and "Panama", along with Weezer's "Dope Nose" and Killswitch Engage's "The End of Heartache".

== Development ==
Members of Van Halen, including David Lee Roth (left) and Eddie Van Halen (right) performed motion capture in order to create their digital likeness for the game.

While the game was formally announced by Activision on May 7, 2009, several sources reported a month earlier that Van Halen was in development. USK, the German software ratings board, posted a content rating for a Van Halen-based game in the series. GameStop temporarily listed the game for pre-order during the month of April. A list of Xbox 360 Achievements was posted to the Internet in early May.

Throughout September 2009, people who purchased or preordered Guitar Hero 5 in the US were given a code which they could redeem to receive a free copy of Guitar Hero: Van Halen prior to its retail release. These copies began arriving to customers in early October for PlayStation 2, Xbox 360, and Wii players, while the PlayStation 3 version was delayed due to a printing error. The game came in a cardboard sleeve with cover art indicating that it was for promotional use.

== Soundtrack ==
Like the other band-centric Guitar Hero games, Guitar Hero: Van Halen includes 28 songs from the band Van Halen, including three guitar solos by Eddie Van Halen, in addition to 19 guest acts. All of the Van Halen songs featured in the game are taken from the David Lee Roth era of the band. The game does not include any songs from the Sammy Hagar and Gary Cherone eras; Activision's head of music licensing, Tim Riley, notes that the lack of such material was not due to any demands or requests made by David Lee Roth. Riley also stated that most of the guest acts were selected by Wolfgang Van Halen, at the suggestion of Roth. The following songs are included in the game:

| Year | Song title | Artist | Guitar Career Venue | Band Career Venue |
|---|---|---|---|---|
| 1978 | "Ain't Talkin' 'Bout Love" | Van Halen | 3. West Hollywood | 3. West Hollywood |
| 1980 | "And the Cradle Will Rock..."^{+} | Van Halen | 5. New York City | 3. West Hollywood |
| 1978 | "Atomic Punk" | Van Halen | 3. West Hollywood | 5. New York City |
| 1979 | "Beautiful Girls" | Van Halen | 7. Dallas | 9. New Netherlands |
| 2005 | "Best of You" | Foo Fighters | 4. Rome | 2. Los Angeles |
| 1982 | "Cathedral"^{a} | Van Halen | 10. The Early Years | 10. The Early Years |
| 2007 | "Come to Life"^{+} | Alter Bridge | 6. Berlin | 6. Berlin |
| 1979 | "Dance the Night Away" | Van Halen | 3. West Hollywood | 5. New York City |
| 2002 | "Dope Nose" | Weezer | 4. Rome | 6. Berlin |
| 1978 | "Double Vision"^{+} | Foreigner | 4. Rome | 6. Berlin |
| 2004 | "The End of Heartache"^{+} | Killswitch Engage | 8. London | 4. Rome |
| 1978 | "Eruption"^{a} | Van Halen | 10. The Early Years | 7. Dallas |
| 1980 | "Everybody Wants Some!!" | Van Halen | 5. New York City | 3. West Hollywood |
| 1978 | "Feel Your Love Tonight" | Van Halen | 7. Dallas | 7. Dallas |
| 2001 | "First Date" | Blink-182 | 2. Los Angeles | 4. Rome |
| 1982 | "Hang ‘Em High"^{+} | Van Halen | 9. New Netherlands | 9. New Netherlands |
| 1981 | "Hear About It Later"^{+} | Van Halen | 7. Dallas | 5. New York City |
| 1984 | "Hot for Teacher"^{+} | Van Halen | 10. The Early Years | 10. The Early Years |
| 1978 | "Ice Cream Man" | Van Halen | 7. Dallas | 7. Dallas |
| 1978 | "I'm the One"^{+} | Van Halen | 10. The Early Years | 10. The Early Years |
| 1989 | "I Want It All" | Queen | 6. Berlin | 6. Berlin |
| 1982 | "Intruder/(Oh) Pretty Woman" | Van Halen | 3. West Hollywood | 3. West Hollywood |
| 1978 | "Jamie's Cryin'" | Van Halen | 3. West Hollywood | 3. West Hollywood |
| 1984 | "Jump" | Van Halen | 5. New York City | 5. New York City |
| 1982 | "Little Guitars" | Van Halen | 9. New Netherlands | 7. Dallas |
| 1980 | "Loss of Control"^{+} | Van Halen | 9. New Netherlands | 9. New Netherlands |
| 2006 | "Master Exploder" | Tenacious D | 8. London | 6. Berlin |
| 1981 | "Mean Street" | Van Halen | 9. New Netherlands | 10. The Early Years |
| 2004 | "Pain" | Jimmy Eat World | 4. Rome | 4 Rome |
| 1990 | "Painkiller"^{+} | Judas Priest | 8. London | 8. London |
| 1984 | "Panama" | Van Halen | 1. Van Halen Intro | 1. Van Halen Intro |
| 1998 | "Pretty Fly (for a White Guy)" | The Offspring | 6. Berlin | 2. Los Angeles |
| 1995 | "Rock and Roll Is Dead" | Lenny Kravitz | 4. Rome | 4. Rome |
| 1980 | "Romeo Delight" | Van Halen | 10. The Early Years | 9. New Netherlands |
| 1978 | "Runnin' with the Devil" | Van Halen | 1. Van Halen Intro | 1. Van Halen Intro |
| 1978 | "Safe European Home" | The Clash | 2. Los Angeles | 2. Los Angeles |
| 1997 | "Semi-Charmed Life" | Third Eye Blind | 2. Los Angeles | 4. Rome |
| 2007 | "Sick, Sick, Sick" | Queens of the Stone Age | 8. London | 8. London |
| 1981 | "So This Is Love?" | Van Halen | 7. Dallas | 10. The Early Years |
| 1979 | "Somebody Get Me a Doctor" | Van Halen | 9. New Netherlands | 9. New Netherlands |
| 1972 | "Space Truckin'" | Deep Purple | 6. Berlin | 8. London |
| 1979 | "Spanish Fly"^{a} | Van Halen | 10. The Early Years | 10. The Early Years |
| 2003 | "Stacy's Mom" | Fountains of Wayne | 2. Los Angeles | 2. Los Angeles |
| 2007 | "The Takedown" | Yellowcard | 6. Berlin | 8. London |
| 1981 | "Unchained" | Van Halen | 5. New York City | 5. New York City |
| 1982 | "White Wedding (Part 1)" | Billy Idol | 2. Los Angeles | 2. Los Angeles |
| 1978 | "You Really Got Me" | Van Halen | 5. New York City | 7. Dallas |

^+ Song contains both a single and double bass drums chart.
^a Song is a guitar solo by Eddie Van Halen.

== Reception ==
Reception

Aggregate scores
| Aggregator | Score |
|---|---|
| GameRankings | 65.6% |
| Metacritic | 55/100 |

Review scores
| Publication | Score |
|---|---|
| Computer and Video Games | 4.0/10 |
| G4 | 3/5 |
| GamePro | 2.5/5 |
| IGN | 4.9/10 |

Early reviews of the promotional version of the game received by redeeming a code that came with Guitar Hero 5 were critical of the game. IGN's Erik Brudvig rated the game 4.9/10, citing problems with the lack of relevance of Van Halen relative to the culture of the 2000s, including having their avatars based on their current appearances rather than that of their 80s heyday, the lack of songs from Sammy Hagar's period in the band, and the lack of features since introduced with Guitar Hero 5. Brudvig ultimately stated that those who got the game free through the Guitar Hero 5 promotion "got what they paid for". Robert Workman of Game Daily was less critical of the title, but still noted that the game lacked features, including some mention of Hagar and Gary Cherone and songs from their period with the band, and felt that the title was below the quality of Guitar Hero: Metallica. Both Brudvig and Workman commented positively on the sound recordings and the note tracking of the Van Halen songs.

Guitar Hero: Van Halen reviews following its release were mixed. Ben Kuchera of Ars Technica considered the game's limited coverage of the band's history to be "a sadly revisionist and dishonest take", and felt that the non-Van Halen songs clashed with the band's own material. Kuchera further pointed to Activision's distribution strategy for the game, stating that he felt that giving the game away free with Guitar Hero 5 showed that Activision did not have confidence in the game. Philip Horton of The Telegraph was critical of the game's song selection, the band's modern appearance, and the lack of any additional extras compared with either the previous band-centric games or Guitar Hero 5, and described it as "the weakest offering in the series to date". Kate Carter of The Guardian commented that the game is "neither one thing or the other", as it neither succeeds at bringing anything new to the Guitar Hero series nor fully pays tribute to Van Halen. Computer and Video Games' review complained about the "shoddy character models" and described it as "the laziest Guitar Hero yet", and Nathan Meunier of GamePro said that while the Van Halen songs were good and challenging, the remaining tracks did not fit the theme of the game, and that "the lackluster presentation makes the game feel more like a glorified track pack than a true homage".

Guitar Hero: Van Halen sold fewer than 75,000 units across all platforms in North America from December 22 to 31, 2009, according to NPD Group. As of April 2010, the game has sold fewer than 250,000 copies worldwide, with only 95,000 units sold in North America. These numbers do not include copies of the game distributed in conjunction with Guitar Hero 5.
