= 1984 (Van Halen album) =

1984 studio album by Van Halen

Studio album by Van Halen
- Released: January 9, 1984
- Recorded: June–October 1983
- Studios: 5150 Studios in Studio City, California
- Genres: Hard rock; glam metal; heavy metal; synth rock; arena rock; pop rock
- Length: 33:22
- Label: Warner Bros.
- Producer: Ted Templeman

Van Halen chronology
Diver Down (1982)	1984 (1984)	5150 (1986)

Singles from 1984
- 1. "Jump" Released: December 1983; 2. "I'll Wait" Released: April 1984; 3. "Panama" Released: June 1984; 4. "Hot for Teacher" Released: October 1984

1984 (stylized in Roman numerals as MCMLXXXIV) is the sixth studio album by American rock band Van Halen, released on January 9, 1984, by Warner Bros. Records. It was the last Van Halen studio album to feature lead singer David Lee Roth until A Different Kind of Truth (2012), following his departure from the band in 1985 due to creative differences. 1984 and the band's self-titled debut album are their best-selling records, each having sold more than 10 million copies in the United States.

1984 was well received by music critics. Rolling Stone ranked the album number 81 on its list of the "100 Greatest Albums of the 1980s". It reached number two on the Billboard 200 and remained there for five weeks, kept from the top spot by Michael Jackson's Thriller, on which guitarist Eddie Van Halen made a guest performance. 1984 produced four singles, including "Jump", Van Halen's only number-one single on the Billboard Hot 100; the top-20 hits "Panama" and "I'll Wait"; and the MTV favorite "Hot for Teacher". The album was certified Diamond by the Recording Industry Association of America (RIAA) in 1999 for ten million shipped copies in the U.S.

== Background and recording ==
Following the tour in support of their fourth studio album, Fair Warning, the band initially wanted to take a break. They released a single, "(Oh) Pretty Woman"/"Happy Trails", intended as a stand-alone release. However, the band's label requested another album due to the A-side's success, and the band recorded their fifth studio album, Diver Down, in a matter of weeks. Following the recording, guitarist Eddie Van Halen was dissatisfied with the concessions he had made to frontman David Lee Roth and producer Ted Templeman, both of whom discouraged Eddie from making keyboards a prominent instrument in the band's music.

By 1983, Eddie was building his own studio, naming it 5150 after the California law code for involuntary psychiatric commitment, alongside longtime engineer Donn Landee. While boards and tape machines were being installed, Eddie began working on synthesizers to pass the time. "There were no presets," said Templeman. "He would just twist off until it sounded right." There, he composed the follow-up to Diver Down without perceived interference from Roth or Templeman. The result was a compromise between the band's creative factions: a mixture of keyboard-heavy songs and the guitar-driven hard rock for which they were known. 1984 took about three months to record, whereas most of their previous LPs were finished in less than two weeks at Sunset Sound Recorders.

Unreleased tracks or renamed working titles from the 1984 sessions included "Baritone Slide", "Lie to You", "Ripley" (which later became "Blood and Fire"), "Any Time, Any Place", and a cover of Wilson Pickett's "In the Midnight Hour". Because finished tracks like "I'll Wait", "Top Jimmy", "Drop Dead Legs", and "Girl Gone Bad" were not mentioned on early Warner Bros. memos, it is believed their titles were changed during production.

In Rolling Stone's retrospective review of the album, Templeman noted, "Eddie Van Halen discovered the synthesizer," citing it as the reason 1984 won the band a broader audience.

== Artwork ==
The album cover art was directed by Richard Seireeni and Pete Angelus, and painted by graphic artist Margo Nahas. Seireeni, then Creative Director at Warner Bros. Records, had collected a number of artist portfolios for the band to review, including the work of Nahas. She had initially been asked to create a cover featuring four chrome women dancing, but declined due to the creative difficulties involved. The band reviewed her work again and chose an existing painting of a putto smoking cigarettes. The model was Carter Helm, the child of one of Nahas' best friends, who was photographed holding a candy cigarette.

Upon the album's release in the UK, the front cover was censored with a sticker that obscured the cigarette and the pack. The back cover features individual photos of the four band members with 1984 in a green futuristic typeface.

== Composition ==
Musically, 1984 has been described as glam/pop metal, hard rock, heavy metal, synth rock, and pop rock. Michael Hann of The Quietus commented that the album sees Van Halen become "everything all at once – synthpop, hard rock, thundering metal, art rock", comparing the guitar lines on "Top Jimmy" to Talking Heads.

The album's first two singles, "Jump" and "I'll Wait", feature prominent synthesizers, as does the one-minute instrumental intro track, "1984". Eddie Van Halen used an Oberheim OB-Xa for most of the album, though "I'll Wait" featured the newer Oberheim OB-8 while his OB-Xa was being repaired. When the band struggled while writing "I'll Wait", producer Ted Templeman brought in Michael McDonald to help David Lee Roth work out the lyrics and melodies.

Eddie Van Halen stated he wrote the arrangement for "Jump" several years before the album was recorded. In a 1995 cover story in Rolling Stone', he said Roth had rejected the synth riff for at least two years before agreeing to write lyrics to it. In his memoir Crazy from the Heat, Roth admitted a preference for guitar work but said he now enjoys the song; he also noted that the lyrics were inspired by watching a man contemplate suicide by jumping off a skyscraper.

"Panama" features a heavy guitar riff and engine noise from Eddie revving his Lamborghini, recorded with microphones positioned near the tailpipes. Later, the video for "Hot for Teacher" received heavy rotation on MTV, helping sustain album sales. Other tracks included "Girl Gone Bad", which Eddie recorded in a hotel room closet to avoid waking his then-wife Valerie Bertinelli, the hard rock "Drop Dead Legs", and "Top Jimmy", a tribute to L.A. punk singer James Paul Koncek (1955-2001) of the band Top Jimmy & the Rhythm Pigs. The album concludes with "House of Pain", a heavy metal song dating back to the band's mid-1970s club sets.

== Release ==
1984 peaked at number 2 on the Billboard 200 (behind Michael Jackson's Thriller, which featured an Eddie Van Halen guitar solo on "Beat It"), and remained in that spot for 5 consecutive weeks. It contained the anthems "Jump", "Panama", "I'll Wait", and "Hot for Teacher". "Jump" reached number 1 on the Billboard Hot 100. 1984 is the second of two Van Halen albums to have achieved RIAA Diamond status, selling over ten million copies in the United States. Their debut Van Halen was the first. "Jump" went on to be certified Gold in April 1984, only months after the album's release.

The album's follow-up singles – the synth-driven "I'll Wait", and "Panama", each peaked at Billboard number 13 on the Pop charts, respectively, in March and June. "Hot for Teacher" was a moderate Billboard Hot 100 success, reaching number 56; the MTV video for "Hot for Teacher" became even more popular. The "Hot for Teacher" video, which was directed by Roth, stars preteen lookalikes of the four Van Halen band members; a stereotypical nerd named "Waldo"; David Lee Roth as Waldo's bus driver; and numerous teachers stripping.

To promote the album, the band ran a contest on MTV. The contest was called, "Lost Weekend" with Van Halen. Fans mailed over 1 million postcards to MTV in hopes of winning the contest. In the promo for MTV, David Lee Roth said, "You won't know where you are, you won't know what's going to happen, and when you come back, you're not gonna have any memory of it." Kurt Jeffries won the contest and was flown to Detroit to join the band. Jeffries was allowed to bring along his best friend. He was given a Lost Weekend T-shirt and a hat. He was also brought on stage and had a large sheet cake smashed in his face which was followed by about a dozen people pouring champagne on him.

== Songwriting credits ==
The UK single release for "I'll Wait" credited Michael McDonald as a co-writer, though he was not credited on the US version. The ASCAP entry for the song lists McDonald as a co-writer alongside Roth and the Van Halen members.

Following the 1996 release of Best Of – Volume I, Van Halen renegotiated their royalties with Warner Bros. Records. In 2004, Roth discovered that the other band members had negotiated a royalty rate five times higher than his for recordings made during his tenure as lead singer.

Songs from 1984 appearing on compilations released after the royalty dispute were credited only to Edward Van Halen, Alex Van Halen, and David Lee Roth. Michael Anthony's name was removed from the credits, a change also seen in the end credits of the 2007 film Superbad.

Anthony's longtime bass technician, Kevin Dugan, has stated that the opening title track was based on a Roland bass synthesizer passage created for Anthony's live solos. Dugan claims that he and Anthony wrote and programmed the piece together.

== Critical reception ==
Professional ratings
Review scores
Source	Rating
AllMusic	5/5 stars
Christgau's Record Guide: The '80s	B+
Encyclopedia of Popular Music	4/5 stars
Rolling Stone	4/5 stars
The Great Rock Discography	7/10
Spin	4/5 stars

Reviews for 1984 were generally favorable. Robert Christgau rated the album a B+, noting that "Side one is pure 'up', and not only that, it sticks to the ears." He added that the band's "pop move avoids fluff because they're heavy, and schlock because they're built for speed," while describing side two as "consolation for their loyal fans—a little sexism, a lot of pyrotechnics, and a standard HM bass attack." J.D. Considine, writing for Rolling Stone', rated the album four out of five stars, calling it "the album that brings all of Van Halen's talent into focus." He noted that while "Jump" was unexpected for the band, "once Alex Van Halen's drums kick in and singer David Lee Roth starts to unravel a typically convoluted story line, things start sounding a little more familiar."

In a 1984 review, Billboard stated the album was "funnier and more versatile than most of their metal brethren," praising the production as "typically strong." A retrospective review by AllMusic's Stephen Thomas Erlewine was extremely positive, noting that while the band had used synths since Women and Children First, this album placed a greater emphasis on songwriting. Martin C. Strong noted in The Great Rock Discography (2004) that the album "saw Van Halen successfully tackling obligatory '80s experimentation." Conversely, Julian Cope described the record as "curious," suggesting it expected listeners to accept "the wholesale metaphor change from Guitar Eddie to Synth Eddie."

At the end of the 1980s, Rolling Stone'—which had previously been critical of the band—ranked 1984 at number 81 on its list of the 100 Greatest Albums of the 1980s. The album was also included in 1001 Albums You Must Hear Before You Die. In 1991, Chuck Eddy praised the album as "pure avant-garde vaudeville," ranking it 12th on his list of the best heavy metal albums. Following the death of Eddie Van Halen in 2020, the album saw a resurgence on the charts.

== Track listing ==
All tracks are written by Edward Van Halen, Alex Van Halen, Michael Anthony, and David Lee Roth.

1984 track listing Side one
No.	Title	Length
1.	"1984" (instrumental)	1:07
2.	"Jump"	4:01
3.	"Panama"	3:31
4.	"Top Jimmy"	2:59
5.	"Drop Dead Legs"	4:14

Side two
No.	Title	Writer(s)	Length
6.	"Hot for Teacher"		4:42
7.	"I'll Wait"	Eddie Van Halen, Alex Van Halen, Michael Anthony, David Lee Roth, Michael McDonald	4:40
8.	"Girl Gone Bad"		4:35
9.	"House of Pain"		3:19
Total length:			33:22

== Personnel ==
=== Van Halen ===
- David Lee Roth – lead vocals
- Edward Van Halen – guitars, keyboards, backing vocals
- Michael Anthony – bass guitar, synth bass on "I'll Wait", backing vocals
- Alex Van Halen – drums, percussion, backing vocals

=== Production ===
- Pete Angelus – art direction
- Chris Bellman – mastering
- Ken Deane – engineering
- Gregg Geller – mastering
- Donn Landee – engineering
- Jo Motta – project coordination
- Margo Nahas – cover art
- Joan Parker – production coordination
- Richard Seireeni – art direction
- Ted Templeman – producer

== Charts ==
=== Weekly charts ===
Chart (1984–1985)	Peak position
Australian Albums (Kent Music Report)	11
Austrian Albums (Ö3 Austria)	12
Canada Top Albums/CDs (RPM)	1
Dutch Albums (Album Top 100)	8
Finnish Albums (The Official Finnish Charts)	3
French Albums (IFOP)	5
German Albums (Offizielle Top 100)	11
Japanese Albums (Oricon)	4
New Zealand Albums (RMNZ)	15
Norwegian Albums (VG-lista)	12
Swedish Albums (Sverigetopplistan)	4
Swiss Albums (Schweizer Hitparade)	7
UK Albums (Official Charts)	15
US Billboard 200	2

Chart (2016)	Position
Canadian Albums (Billboard)	71

Chart (2020)	Peak position
Hungarian Albums (MAHASZ)	38
US Top Rock Albums (Billboard)	7

=== Year-end charts ===
Chart (1984)	Position
Canada Top Albums/CDs (RPM)	9
French Albums (IFOP)	9
German Albums (Offizielle Top 100)	21
New Zealand Albums (RMNZ)	35
Swiss Albums (Schweizer Hitparade)	18
UK Albums (OCC)	94
US Billboard 200	6

Chart (1985)	Position
US Billboard 200	73

Chart (2020)	Position
US Top Rock Albums (Billboard)	96

== Certifications ==
Region	Certification	Certified units/sales
Canada (Music Canada)	5× Platinum	500,000^{^}
Finland (Musiikkituottajat)	Gold	25,305
France (SNEP)	Gold	100,000^{*}
Germany (BVMI)	Platinum	500,000^{^}
Italy (FIMI) (since 2009)	Gold	25,000^{‡}
Japan (RIAJ)	Gold	100,000^{^}
New Zealand (RMNZ)	Platinum	15,000^{^}
United Kingdom (BPI)	Gold	100,000^{^}
United States (RIAA)	Diamond	10,000,000^{^}
^{*} Sales figures based on certification alone.^{^} Shipments figures based on certification alone.^{‡} Sales+streaming figures based on certification alone.
