= Diver Down =

Studio album by Van Halen
- Released: April 19, 1982
- Studios: Amigo Studios (North Hollywood); Sunset Sound (Hollywood)
- Genres: Hard rock; heavy metal; power pop
- Length: 31:04
- Label: Warner Bros.
- Producer: Ted Templeman

Van Halen chronology
Fair Warning (1981)	Diver Down (1982)	1984 (1984)

Singles from Diver Down
- 1. "(Oh) Pretty Woman" Released: January 18, 1982; 2. "Dancing in the Street" Released: May 1982; 3. "Secrets" Released: August 23, 1982

Diver Down is the fifth studio album by American rock band Van Halen, released on April 19, 1982, by Warner Bros. Records. It spent 65 weeks on the album chart in the United States and had, by 1998, sold four million copies in the United States. Despite its commercial success, selling faster than its predecessor Fair Warning (1981), it was more lukewarmly received by contemporary music critics.

Released per the label's request that the group record an album to keep them in the public eye, Diver Down was recorded with producer Ted Templeman over the course of twelve days. As a result of its quick production, the album is heavy on cover versions as well as genre experiments and guitar interludes. Alongside full-length original songs, the material includes excursions into jazz, country blues, doo-wop, a cappella and neo-classical music, in addition to covers of mid-1960s songs – the biggest of these, reworkings of Roy Orbison's "(Oh) Pretty Woman" and Martha & the Vandellas' "Dancing in the Street", were hit singles.

== Background and recording ==
Five of the twelve songs on the album are covers, the most popular being the cover of "(Oh) Pretty Woman", a Roy Orbison song. Eddie Van Halen recalled how the album came about:

When we came off the Fair Warning tour last year [1981], we were going to take a break and spend a lot of time writing this and that. Dave [Lee Roth] came up with the idea of, 'Hey, why don't we start off the new year with just putting out a single?' He wanted to do 'Dancing in the Streets.' He gave me the original Martha Reeves & the Vandellas tape, and I listened to it and said, 'I can't get a handle on anything out of this song.' I couldn't figure out a riff, and you know the way I like to play: I always like to do a riff, as opposed to just hitting barre chords and strumming. So I said, 'Look, if you want to do a cover tune, why don't we do 'Pretty Woman'? It took one day. We went to Sunset Sound in L.A., recorded it, and it came out right after the first of the year. It started climbing the charts, so all of a sudden Warner Bros. is going, 'You got a hit single on your hands. We gotta have that record.' We said, 'Wait a minute, we just did that to keep us out there, so that people know we're still alive.' But they just kept pressuring, so we jumped right back in without any rest or time to recuperate from the tour, and started recording. We spent 12 days making the album…. It was a lot of fun.

Three of the original songs were around long before the album was made. "Hang 'Em High" can trace its roots back to 1976 as "Last Night", which had the same music but different lyrics. "The Full Bug" borrows heavily from a demo track called "The Bottom Line" (not the track of the same name released on Roth's 1988 album Skyscraper) that leaked in 2023. The instrumental "Cathedral" was also nothing new, it having been played in its final form throughout 1981 with earlier versions going back to 1980. Additionally, "Happy Trails" had been recorded for their 1977 demos.

"Where Have All the Good Times Gone" is a cover of a song by The Kinks. During the band's bar-playing days, vocalist David Lee Roth bought a budget label Kinks double album, and Van Halen learned all of the songs on one side to use as staples of their set. Eddie Van Halen created the effects in the guitar solo by running the edge of his pick up and down the strings and using an Echoplex.

"Cathedral" was so named because the band members thought it sounded like a Catholic church organ. The track is a well-known example of the 'cascade effect' on guitar, described by Jon Chappell of EQ Magazine as when the guitarist "plays eighth notes and the delay spits back notes of equal-amplitude on the second and fourth sixteenth notes, creating a steady stream of sixteenth notes. This doubles the rate at which notes come from the guitar". The piece was a stylistic departure for Van Halen, with a quiet prowess that has been compared to Focus.

The lyrics to "Secrets" were inspired by greeting cards which Roth bought in Albuquerque, New Mexico, on the preceding tour. Eddie Van Halen used a Gibson doubleneck 12-string for the song, played with a flatpick. The solo was done in one take.

The track "Intruder", which precedes "(Oh) Pretty Woman", was written by Roth specifically to cover the length of the promotional video for the "(Oh) Pretty Woman" single. Roth recalled that the video "was about three minutes too long. So, I said, we won't cut any of it; we'll write soundtrack music for the beginning. So we went into the studio and I played the synthesizer and I wrote it. It took about an hour to put that together." It is characterized by its shrieking, distorting guitars, displaying heavy dissonance, and is comparable to Neu!'s "Negativland" (1972). The "(Oh) Pretty Woman" music video was one of the first banned by MTV, although VH1 Classic (now MTV Classic) has continuously aired it. Roth explained the ban as the result of complaints that it made fun of "an almost theological figure", the Samurai warrior (played by bassist Michael Anthony), and also because two little people appeared to molest a woman (actually a Los Angeles area transgender performer). The video, directed by Roth and Pete Angelus, was, he said: "rather like a surrealistic art project ... where they paint the picture and come back three days later and try to figure out what they meant."

"Little Guitars" was inspired by the flamenco guitar playing of Carlos Montoya. Eddie Van Halen found he was unable to imitate Montoya's finger picking, so he used a pick as an assist. Roth, who thought the music Eddie Van Halen came up with sounded Mexican (Montoya was actually Spanish), wrote lyrics intended to evoke that nation. The guitar used on the recording (and subsequent tour) was a miniature Les Paul, built by Nashville luthier David Petschulat and sold to Eddie on the earlier Fair Warning Tour.

Covering "Big Bad Bill (Is Sweet William Now)" was Roth's idea, as was having Eddie and Alex Van Halen's father Jan play clarinet on the track. Deemed a "campy period piece," it has been compared to the Temperance Seven, and Freddie Mercury.

Of "The Full Bug", Roth said 'PRFCs' were "great shoes for when the cockroach moves into the corner and you can't get at it with your foot or the broom anymore. You just jam your toe into the corner and hit as hard as you can. And if you did it right you got the full bug. So this slang means — bammm! — you have to give it everything you've got. Make the maximum effort, do everything possible, get the full bug."

"Happy Trails" is a playful a cappella version of the Dale Evans song. Reviewers have compared it to Cream's "Mother's Lament" at the end of Disraeli Gears (1967), and The Muppet Show.

== Cover art ==
The album cover artwork displays the "diver down" flag used in many US (and Canadian) jurisdictions to indicate a Scuba diver is currently submerged in the area. David Lee Roth said it was meant to imply that "there was something going on that's not apparent to your eyes. You put up the red flag with the white slash. Well, a lot of people approach Van Halen as sort of the abyss. It means, it's not immediately apparent to your eyes what is going on underneath the surface." While impressed by Roth's creative marketing spin, manager Noel Monk also explained the sexual double-entendre "dive her down" in his 2017 band memoir Running with the Devil. The back cover of the album features a photo by Richard Aaron of Van Halen on stage at the Tangerine Bowl in Orlando, Florida, that was taken on October 24, 1981, as they concluded a set opening for The Rolling Stones. The sleeve has been noted for its 'modern', minimalist aesthetic, reminiscent of the sleeves of "Joy Division impersonators".

== Critical reception ==
Professional ratings
Review scores
Source	Rating
AllMusic	4/5 stars
Christgau's Record Guide: The '80s	B−
Encyclopedia of Popular Music	3/5 stars
The Great Rock Discography	6/10
Lincoln Journal Star	3.5/4 stars
Record Mirror	3/5 stars
Rolling Stone	2/5 stars
The Rolling Stone Album Guide	4/5 stars
Sounds	3/5 stars

In a review for The Los Angeles Times, Don Waller considered Diver Down to be "the best heavy-metal record to come along in several years." He enjoyed how several "mid-60s classics" were customized into vehicles for the band's "high-octane assault", further highlighting the three instrumentals for adding "spice", and how the original songs "rework unorthodox metal dictums with a twist". "Best of all", he added, is the band's "loony sense of humour", as shown by covering the vintage jazz-blues song "Big Bad Bill". Lincoln Journal Star critic Bart Becker named Van Halen the best heavy metal band partly for their tongue-in-cheek style, adding that besides some original songs, the group "forges heavy-metal" out of "unexpected elements" such as country blues, doo-wop, a cappella, clarinets, and the Roy Orbison and Marvin Gaye covers. Cynthia Rose of New Musical Express praised Templeman's production for holding the experiments – namely the acoustic intros, "planes" of synthesizer, clarinet parts, a cappella singing and "some throwaway humour" – in "expert balance", and wrote that while a quarter of the album is filler, Roth's voice suits the crass lyrics.

Steve Smith of The Times stated that Diver Down continues the band's "four-year tradition of recycling old songs ... without adding anything new, save some heavy-metal chording and David Roth's snarling vocals." However, he noted several pleasant surprises that, along with the "odd little instrumentals", evidence the band's imagination, further lauding Templeman's production and "brief moments of instrumental lucidity" from the Van Halen brothers. Parke Puterbaugh of Rolling Stone notes that if listeners disregard the five cover versions and three instrumentals, Diver Down "suddenly seems like a cogent case for consumer fraud. Van Halen, it appears, is running out of ideas: there's more excelsior here than in a shipment of glassware." He adds that aside from Eddie's "three guitar nocturnes", there are only four original compositions, only two of which are exciting.

Reviewing the album for The Rocket, John Keister believed the album "sounds like it was a lot of fun to make", but commented that it contains filler songs which grow off listeners after several listens, noting: "Many of the cuts on this album are intros that seem to serve little function except taking up space on the vinyl." He believed it should have been cut to a four-song EP. Robin Smith of Record Mirror wrote in his review: "Reworking three old standards and messing around on the flip side doesn't make a great album – and Van Halen should have produced an earthquake." Bill Carlton of Daily News commented that while the album is naturally heavy on energetic rock songs, Van Halen also proved capable of the "lovely neo-classical" piece "Cathedral". However, he panned the 1960s covers and considered the barbershop quartet rendition of "Happy Trails" to be undercut by its apparent insincerity. In Sounds, Sandy Robertson criticized the new material, calling the songs "a curious lucky bag", and felt that side two was "so mixed up", overall believing the album should have been a more coherent statement.

In a retrospective review, Stephen Thomas Erlewine of AllMusic called Diver Down "one of Van Halen's best records, one that's just pure joy to hear", saying it hearkens back to the exuberance and lightheartedness of their early albums while retaining the tightly knit and practiced playing honed over the length of their career. He also found it effectively showcased all four individual members, and said the cover songs were thoroughly revamped to make them distinctly Van Halen works. Dave Queen of Stylus Magazine noted that with its "additional fragments, sketches, and impenetrable arcana," Diver Down is "like an 'unofficial' Fall release or Smiley Smile." Colin Larkin, writing in The Encyclopedia of Popular Music (1997), names Diver Down the weakest Van Halen album, praising only the covers of 1960s standards as the standout tracks. The editors of The Rolling Stone Album Guide (2004) describe the album as a return to form for Van Halen, "entertaining with a smile and lots of squeals", adding that it contains "a ridiculous five covers, but they're some of the band's best". In his reference book Copendium (2012), Julian Cope dismissed Diver Down as "bar band filler of the most abject variety (how can I live without more covers of 'Pretty Woman', 'Dancing in the Street' and 'Where Have All the Good Times Gone'?)"

== Legacy ==
In 2022, Diver Down was ranked at number three in Guitar World's list of "The 25 greatest rock guitar albums of 1982". Country musician Kenny Chesney, who later socialized with Eddie Van Halen and Sammy Hagar, has commented that it was "the first album he ever bought". In rankings of the band's albums, Diver Down has been ranked seventh best by Matthew Wilkening of Ultimate Classic Rock and the staff of Consequence, and ninth best by Eduardo RivadavIa of Loudwire,

Wilkening says that while Diver Down is "easily the most criticized" of the Van Halen albums fronted by Roth, it has a consistent summery feel, "thanks partially to the series of amazing guitar interludes that turn up between tracks". Consequence write that Van Halen "went pop" for Diver Down, in contrast to the aggression of Fair Warning, and that as such it is sometimes dismissed by fans of the group's harder material. However, the website comment that it charms those who "embraced the (power) pop direction". They believe that some tracks are led by "some of the most emotive and pleasant guitar work Eddie Van Halen ever recorded", but believe the album's final songs "veer too heavily into David Lee Roth's showtunes vibe". Morgan Brown, in Van Halen: Every Album, Every Song (2023), considers it to be "a hugely enjoyable lucky dip of a record" that, despite feeling more like "a superior 'leftovers and rarities' collection than a coherent studio album", still contains only "terrific" material that together showcases the band's exquisite range. Eddie van Halen has since criticized the album for being rushed to meet Warner. Bros' demands and as a result containing too many covers.

== Track listing ==
All tracks are written by Edward Van Halen, Alex Van Halen, Michael Anthony, and David Lee Roth, except where noted.

Side one
No.	Title	Writer(s)	Length
1.	"Where Have All the Good Times Gone!" (The Kinks cover)	Ray Davies	3:02
2.	"Hang 'Em High"		3:28
3.	"Cathedral" (instrumental)		1:23
4.	"Secrets"		3:28
5.	"Intruder" (instrumental)		1:39
6.	"(Oh) Pretty Woman" (Roy Orbison cover)	William Dees; Roy Orbison	2:53

Side two
No.	Title	Writer(s)	Length
7.	"Dancing in the Street" (Martha and the Vandellas cover)	Marvin Gaye; Ivy Hunter; William Stevenson	3:43
8.	"Little Guitars (Intro)" (instrumental)		0:42
9.	"Little Guitars"		3:47
10.	"Big Bad Bill (Is Sweet William Now)" (Margaret Young cover)	Milton Ager; Jack Yellen	2:44
11.	"The Full Bug"		3:18
12.	"Happy Trails" (Roy Rogers and Dale Evans cover)	Dale Evans	1:03
Total length:			31:04

== Personnel ==
Van Halen

- David Lee Roth – lead vocals, synthesizer on "Intruder", acoustic guitar and harmonica on "The Full Bug"
- Edward Van Halen – electric and acoustic guitars, backing vocals, synthesizer on "Dancing in the Street"
- Michael Anthony – bass guitar, backing vocals
- Alex Van Halen – drums

Additional personnel

- Jan Van Halen – clarinet on "Big Bad Bill"

Production

- Richard Aaron – photography
- Pete Angelus – art direction
- Ken Deane – second engineer
- Donn Landee – engineer
- Jo Motta – production coordination
- Richard Seireeni – art direction
- Ted Templeman – producer
- Neil Zlozower – photography

== Charts ==
Chart (1982)	Peak position
Australian Albums (Kent Music Report)	79
Canada Top Albums/CDs (RPM)	5
Dutch Albums (Album Top 100)	28
Finnish Albums (The Official Finnish Charts)	20
French Albums (SNEP)	9
German Albums (Offizielle Top 100)	65
Japanese Albums (Oricon)	22
New Zealand Albums (RMNZ)	37
Norwegian Albums (VG-lista)	19
Swedish Albums (Sverigetopplistan)	28
UK Albums (Official Charts)	36
US Billboard 200	3

== Certifications ==
Region	Certification	Certified units/sales
Canada (Music Canada)	Platinum	100,000^{^}
United States (RIAA)	4× Platinum	4,000,000^{^}
^{^} Shipments figures based on certification alone.
