= Big Bad Bill (Is Sweet William Now) =

1924 song by Milton Ager and Jack Yellen

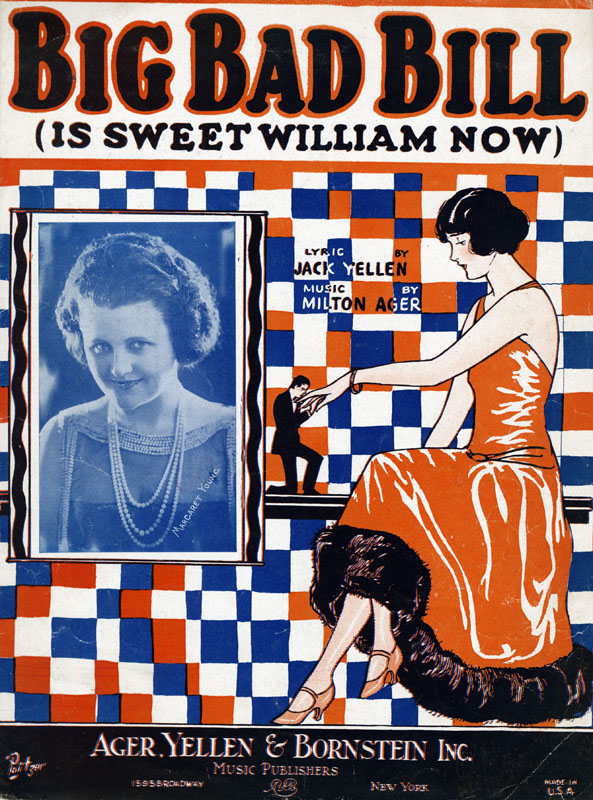
Sheet music cover featuring Margaret Young, 1924

"Big Bad Bill (Is Sweet William Now)" is a song with music by Milton Ager and lyrics by Jack Yellen, written in 1924. The song became a vocal hit for Margaret Young accompanied by Rube Bloom, and an instrumental hit for the Don Clark Orchestra.

The song has also been recorded by Ernest Hare (1924), Billy Murray (1924), Clementine Smith (1924), Emmett Miller (1929), Glen Gray and the Casa Loma Orchestra (1940), Peggy Lee (1962), Merle Haggard (1973), Ry Cooder (1978), Leon Redbone (1978), Van Halen (1982) and others and has been a popular song in barbershop quartet and chorus competitions.

The lyrics describe a man "in the town of Louisville..." who was once a fearsome and rough character known for getting into fights, who, after getting married, becomes a peaceable person who devotes his time to domestic activities such as washing dishes and mopping the floor. He was "Stronger than Samson I declare, Til the brown skinned woman, Bobbed his hair."

== Recordings ==
- Billy Murray (1924) Victor Talking Machine Company: 19503-A
- Emmett Miller (1929) accompanied by his Georgia Crackers. Okeh: 41305
- Sugar 'n' Spice (1962), by Peggy Lee
- I Love Dixie Blues (1973), by Merle Haggard
- Jazz (1978), by Ry Cooder (opening track)
- Champagne Charlie (1978), by Leon Redbone
- Diver Down (1982), by Van Halen
- Bursting With Pride, by the Pride of Baltimore Chorus

== In film ==
- William Kunstler: Disturbing the Universe (2009), sung by Sam Amidon and Shahzad Ismaily during the credits
- Boardwalk Empire, Season 2
