= Van Halen II =

Studio album by Van Halen
- Released: March 23, 1979
- Recorded: December 10–16, 1978
- Studios: Sunset Sound Recorders, Hollywood, California
- Genres: Hard rock; heavy metal
- Length: 31:36
- Label: Warner Bros.
- Producer: Ted Templeman

Van Halen chronology
Van Halen (1978)	Van Halen II (1979)	Women and Children First (1980)

Singles from Van Halen II
- 1. "Dance the Night Away" Released: April 1979; 2. "Beautiful Girls" Released: August 1979; 3. "Somebody Get Me a Doctor" Released: August 1979 (Japan)

Van Halen II is the second studio album by American rock band Van Halen. Released by Warner Bros Records on March 23, 1979, it peaked at number six on the U.S. Billboard Top LPs & Tape chart and yielded hit singles "Dance the Night Away" and "Beautiful Girls." As of 2004, it had sold almost six million copies in the United States alone. Critical reaction to the album has been positive, with The Rolling Stone Album Guide praising the "feel-good, party atmosphere" of the songs.

== Background and recording ==
Recording of the album started at Sunset Studio on December 10, 1978, one week after completing their first world tour, and was complete within a week. The band used a Putnam 610 console to record the album, similar to the console Eddie would later install in his home studio in 1983. Many of the songs on Van Halen II are known to have existed prior to the release of the first album, and are present on the demos recorded in 1976 by Gene Simmons, and in 1977 by Ted Templeman, including an early version of "Beautiful Girls" (then known as "Bring On the Girls") and "Somebody Get Me a Doctor."

== Artwork and packaging ==
The black-and-yellow guitar on the back of the album known as "Bumblebee" is buried with Pantera guitarist Dimebag Darrell, who was killed December 8, 2004. Eddie Van Halen placed it in his Kiss Kasket at his funeral because Darrell had said it was his favorite. Eddie himself stated in an interview conducted in December 1979 by Jas Obrecht and published in the April 1980 edition of Guitar Player Magazine, that the guitar itself was not actually used on the tracking of Van Halen II, as it had only been completed just in time for the photo shoots for the album.

David Lee Roth is shown in a cast in the inner liner notes, as he allegedly broke his heel on the third try of the spread-eagle jump used on the back cover photo.

In the liner notes, The Sheraton Inn of Madison, Wisconsin, is thanked. On Van Halen's first tour, they stayed at the hotel and destroyed the seventh floor, having fire extinguisher fights in the hallways and throwing televisions out windows. They blamed the incidents on their tour-mates at the time, Journey.

== Critical reception ==
Professional ratings
Review scores
Source	Rating
AllMusic	4/5 stars
Christgau's Record Guide	C+
Classic Rock	3.5/5 stars
The Encyclopedia of Popular Music	4/5 stars
The Great Rock Discography	7/10
The Rolling Stone Album Guide	4.5/5 stars

In a 1979 Rolling Stone review, Timothy White writes, "Scattered throughout Van Halen's second album are various Vanilla Fudge bumps and grinds, an Aerosmith-derived pseudobravado, a bit of Bad Company basement funk and even a few Humble Pie miniraveups," adding that the "LP retains a numbing live feel." The New York Times deemed the album "screaming macho rock howlings and power-driven electric guitar attacks."

In a retrospective review, Stephen Thomas Erlewine from AllMusic noted that the album is "virtually a carbon copy of their 1978 debut," though goes on to say it is "lighter and funnier" and "some of the grandest hard rock ever made." Erlewine praises Eddie's "phenomenal gift" and Roth's "knowing shuck and jive." In 1991, Chuck Eddy ranked Van Halen II at number 128 in his list of the best heavy metal albums, calling it a pub-friendly pop-metal album that anticipated 1980s music. Eddy described the "Latin lilt" of "Dance the Night Away" as merengue and praised the punk rock-esque tempos and attitudes of "Light Up the Sky" and "D.O.A.", comparing the latter to the Stooges, but dismissed most of the songs with female characters as "tripe".

== Commercial performance ==
It reached No. 6 on the Billboard Top LPs & Tape chart and No. 23 on the UK Albums Chart. Van Halen II was certified 5× Platinum in 2004. About 5.087 million records have been sold in the United States as of 2004. In 2000, Van Halen II was remastered and re-released.

== Track listing ==
All tracks are written by Edward Van Halen, Alex Van Halen, Michael Anthony and David Lee Roth except for "You're No Good", which is by Clint Ballard Jr..

Side one
No.	Title	Length
1.	"You're No Good" (Dee Dee Warwick cover)	3:16
2.	"Dance the Night Away"	3:06
3.	"Somebody Get Me a Doctor"	2:52
4.	"Bottoms Up!"	3:05
5.	"Outta Love Again"	2:51

Side two
No.	Title	Length
6.	"Light Up the Sky"	3:13
7.	"Spanish Fly" (Instrumental)	1:00
8.	"D.O.A."	4:09
9.	"Women in Love..."	4:08
10.	"Beautiful Girls"	3:56
Total length:		31:36

== Personnel ==
=== Van Halen ===
- David Lee Roth – lead vocals
- Edward Van Halen – guitar, backing vocals
- Michael Anthony – bass guitar, backing vocals
- Alex Van Halen – drums

=== Production ===
- Corey Bailey – engineering
- Dave Bhang – artwork and design, art direction
- Jim Fitzpatrick – engineer
- Gregg Geller – remastering
- Elliot Gilbert – photography
- Donn Landee – engineer
- Jo Motta – project coordinator
- Ted Templeman – production
- Neil Zlozower – photography

== Charts ==
=== Weekly charts ===
Chart (1979)	Peak position
Australian Albums (Kent Music Report)	68
Canada Top Albums/CDs (RPM)	15
Dutch Albums (Album Top 100)	11
German Albums (Offizielle Top 100)	24
Japanese Albums (Oricon)	30
Swedish Albums (Sverigetopplistan)	22
UK Albums (Official Charts)	23
US Billboard 200	6

Chart (2021)	Peak position
Hungarian Albums (MAHASZ)	36

=== Year-end charts ===
Chart (1979)	Position
Dutch Albums (Album Top 100)	47
US Billboard 200	38

== Certifications ==
Region	Certification	Certified units/sales
Canada (Music Canada)	2× Platinum	200,000^{^}
France (SNEP)	Gold	100,000^{*}
Japan (RIAJ)	Gold	100,000^{^}
Netherlands (NVPI)	2× Gold	100,000^{^}
United States (RIAA)	5× Platinum	5,000,000^{^}
^{*} Sales figures based on certification alone.^{^} Shipments figures based on certification alone.
