= I'll Wait =

1984 single by Van Halen

Single by Van Halen

from the album 1984
- B-side: "Girl Gone Bad" (US and Japan); "Drop Dead Legs" (UK)
- Released: April 1984 (US); July 27, 1984 (UK)
- Recorded: 1983
- Studio: 5150 Studios, Studio City
- Genre: Synth rock; hard rock
- Length: 4:10 (single version); 4:40 (album version)
- Label: Warner Bros.
- Songwriters: Edward Van Halen; Alex Van Halen; Michael Anthony; David Lee Roth; Michael McDonald
- Producer: Ted Templeman

Van Halen singles chronology
"Jump" (1983)	"I'll Wait" (1984)	"Panama" (1984)

Audio
- "I'll Wait" on YouTube

"I'll Wait" is a song by American rock band Van Halen, taken from their sixth studio album, 1984 (1984). It was written by band members Eddie Van Halen, Alex Van Halen, Michael Anthony and David Lee Roth, along with Michael McDonald, and produced by Ted Templeman.

It was the second single released from the record and reached number 13 on the Billboard Hot 100. Despite the song being a hit, no video was ever filmed for it.

== Writing and composition ==
The song was written as a collaboration between Van Halen and Doobie Brothers singer Michael McDonald, whom Templeman brought in when David Lee Roth had trouble completing the melody and lyrics to the song. The song is in the key of D minor, having a moderate common time tempo of 114 beats per minute.

Like "Jump", the song features keyboards almost entirely, including a synthesizer bass line, and also features heavy use of Alex Van Halen's Rototom drum kit.

The song's subject was inspired by a woman wearing men's underwear in a Calvin Klein print media advertisement. Roth pinned up the ad beside his Sony Trinitron television and addressed the lyrics to the model.

The single's original cover featured the band posing in the same location where the cover for the "Hot for Teacher" single had been shot.

David Lee Roth and producer Ted Templeman wanted to remove the song from the album, while Eddie Van Halen and engineer Donn Landee pushed for its inclusion.

== Reception ==
Cash Box said that "this mid-tempo solid rocker is sure to catch the ear of both heavy metal and pop fans" and that "lead guitarist Eddie Van Halen sculpts some masterful backing riffs, and also creates a thoughtful and tasty guitar solo."

Chuck Klosterman of Vulture.com ranked it the 43rd-best Van Halen song, noting its "mammoth drums, mammoth synth, not much verve or panache."

== Track listing ==
US 7" single

Side A
No.	Title	Length
1.	"I'll Wait" (radio edit)	4:10

Side B
No.	Title	Length
1.	"Girl Gone Bad"	4:33

UK 7" single/US 12" single

Side A
No.	Title	Length
1.	"I'll Wait" (radio edit)	4:10

Side B
No.	Title	Length
1.	"Drop Dead Legs"	4:13

== Personnel ==
- David Lee Roth – lead vocals
- Eddie Van Halen – guitar, keyboards
- Alex Van Halen – drums
- Michael Anthony – keyboard bass, backing vocals

== Charts ==
Chart (1984)	Peak position
Canada Top Singles (RPM)	21
Italy (FIMI)	48
UK Singles (Official Charts)	85
US Billboard Hot 100	13
US Mainstream Rock (Billboard)	2
