= Beautiful Girls (Van Halen song) =

- Solid center variant of the Canadian single

Single by Van Halen

from the album Van Halen II
- B-side: "D.O.A."
- Released: August 1979
- Recorded: December 1978 – January 1979
- Studio: Sunset Sound Recorders, Hollywood
- Genre: Hard rock
- Length: 3:57
- Label: Warner Bros.
- Songwriters: Michael Anthony; David Lee Roth; Alex Van Halen; Edward Van Halen
- Producer: Ted Templeman

Van Halen singles chronology
"Dance the Night Away" (1979)	"Beautiful Girls" (1979)	"Somebody Get Me a Doctor" (1979)

"Beautiful Girls" is the 10th and final song on Van Halen's second album, Van Halen II, from 1979. The song was a concert staple during the band's tour for the album. The song was originally titled "Bring On The Girls" when recorded for a 25-song Warner Brothers demo, but the title and lyrics were changed accordingly.

== Reception ==
Cash Box said that "David Lee Roth belts out the lead vocal with a sense of good humor rarely seen in heavy metal." Record World said that Van Halen's "trademark raunchy guitar is accompanied by carefree, youthful vocals." Author Chuck Klosterman ranked it the 20th-best Van Halen song, calling it the "supernatural definition of musical immediacy."

== Charts ==
Chart (1979)	Peak position
US Billboard Hot 100	84
