= Panama (song) =

1984 single by Van Halen

Single by Van Halen

from the album 1984
- B-side: "Drop Dead Legs" (US and Japan); "Girl Gone Bad" (UK)
- Released: May 4, 1984 (UK); June 18, 1984 (US)
- Recorded: 1983
- Studio: 5150 Studios, Studio City
- Genre: Hard rock; glam metal
- Length: 3:31
- Label: Warner Bros.
- Songwriters: Michael Anthony; David Lee Roth; Alex Van Halen; Edward Van Halen
- Producer: Ted Templeman

Van Halen singles chronology
| "I'll Wait" (1984) | "Panama" (1984) | "Hot for Teacher" (1984) |

Audio
- "Panama" on YouTube

Music video
- "Panama" on YouTube

Alternative cover art
- European release

"Panama" is a song by the American rock band Van Halen. It was the third US single released from their album 1984.

== Background ==
Despite its name, the song has nothing to do with the country. Instead, the song was reportedly written about a car. In an interview with Howard Stern, lead singer David Lee Roth explained the meaning behind the song. Although the song features some suggestive lyrics, it is about a car that Roth saw race in Las Vegas; its name was "Panama Express", hence the title of the song.

Panama was also the name of Roth's Opel Kadett.

Roth wrote the song after being accused by a reporter of "singing about only women, partying, and fast cars". He realized he had never written a song about fast cars and decided to write one.

In an interview with guitarist Eddie Van Halen, he said the song was musically inspired by AC/DC's straightforward three chord rock style.

During the bridge of the song where Roth says "I can barely see the road from the heat comin' off," Eddie Van Halen can be heard revving his 1972 Lamborghini Miura S in the background. The car was backed up to the studio and microphones were attached to the exhaust pipe to record the sound for the song.

The song is in the key of E♭ Major. However, the published score is in the key of E Major, having a moderate rock common time tempo of 144 beats per minute.

== Musical style ==
Musically, "Panama" has been described as hard rock, glam metal, and heavy metal.

== Music video ==
The music video for the song, directed by Pete Angelus, primarily features on-stage performances by the band. The bulk of the video was shot at The Spectrum in Philadelphia over two nights both during the show and at soundcheck. Portions of it were filmed at the tour dates prior during performances at the Providence Civic Center in Providence, Rhode Island.

The car shown in the music video is a heavily customized 1951 Mercury Eight convertible - notably not "Panama Express", the Opel or the Miura.

== Reception ==
Chuck Klosterman of Vulture ranked it the fourth best Van Halen song, calling it the "strongest pure riff in the catalogue."

== In popular culture ==
The song was prominently featured in "Coma Guy," a 2020 episode of the animated TV series Family Guy, in which Peter mistakes the album 1984 for a book-on-CD of George Orwell's novel Nineteen Eighty-Four and becomes addicted to the song. It is also featured in the film Superbad.

The song is also featured as in-game music for the video game Gran Turismo 4, with the song prominently featured in the game intro of the North American version.

During the United States Invasion of Panama, US soldiers played this song repeatedly as a form of psychological warfare in an attempt to force General Manuel Noriega out of hiding

The Toronto Maple Leafs began to use the song when scoring at home against Original Six teams in the 2023–24 season.

== Personnel ==
- David Lee Roth – lead vocals
- Eddie Van Halen – guitar, backing vocals
- Alex Van Halen – drums
- Michael Anthony – bass guitar, backing vocals

== Charts ==
| Chart (1984–85) | Peak position |
|---|---|
| Argentina (CAPIF) | 2 |
| Australia (Kent Music Report) | 74 |
| Canada Top Singles (RPM) | 15 |
| Ireland (IRMA) | 30 |
| UK Singles (Official Charts) | 61 |
| US Billboard Hot 100 | 13 |
| US Mainstream Rock (Billboard) | 2 |

| Chart (2020) | Peak position |
|---|---|
| US Hot Rock & Alternative Songs (Billboard) | 12 |

== Certifications ==
| Region | Certification | Certified units/sales |
|---|---|---|
| United Kingdom (BPI) | Silver | 200,000^{‡} |
^{‡} Sales+streaming figures based on certification alone.
