= Where Have All the Good Times Gone =

- 1973 UK reissue picture sleeve

Single by the Kinks

from the album The Kink Kontroversy
- A-side: "Till the End of the Day"
- Released: 19 November 1965
- Recorded: 3–4 November 1965
- Studio: Pye, London
- Length: 2:49
- Label: Pye (UK); Reprise (US)
- Songwriter: Ray Davies
- Producer: Shel Talmy

The Kinks UK singles chronology
"See My Friends" (1965)	"Till the End of the Day" / "Where Have All the Good Times Gone" (1965)	"Dedicated Follower of Fashion" (1966)

The Kinks US singles chronology
"A Well Respected Man" (1965)	"Till the End of the Day" / "Where Have All the Good Times Gone" (1965)	"Dedicated Follower of Fashion" (1966)

"Where Have All the Good Times Gone" is a song written by Ray Davies and performed by the Kinks. It was released as the B-side to "Till the End of the Day", and then on their album The Kink Kontroversy (1965 UK, 1966 US).

Cash Box described the single as a "raunchy, shufflin’ emotional tale of despair".

Ray Davies said, "We'd been rehearsing 'Where Have All the Good Times Gone' and our tour manager at the time, who was a lot older than us, said, 'That's a song a 40-year-old would write. I don't know where you get that from.' But I was taking inspiration from older people around me. I'd been watching them in the pubs, talking about taxes and job opportunities."

The song has since gained "classic" status and featured on numerous compilations. Pye Records released the track as a single in November 1973 (Pye 7N 45313 b/w "Lola"). This re-release failed to chart. Although the Kinks had performed the song live on the TV show Ready Steady Go! in 1965, it would not become a staple of their live shows until the 1970s.

The song was covered and released as a single in 1982 by Van Halen for their album Diver Down, reaching 17 on Billboard's Mainstream Rock chart. The song has also been covered by David Bowie on Pin Ups.

== Personnel ==
According to band researcher Doug Hinman:

The Kinks

- Ray Davies – lead vocal, acoustic guitar
- Dave Davies – lead and backing vocals, electric guitar
- Pete Quaife – bass
- Mick Avory – drums

Additional musician

- Nicky Hopkins – piano
