= Jump (Van Halen song) =

1983 single by Van Halen

Single by Van Halen

from the album 1984
- B-side: "House of Pain"
- Released: December 1983
- Recorded: 1983
- Studio: 5150, Los Angeles
- Genre: Synth rock; hard rock; pop rock
- Length: 4:02
- Label: Warner Bros.
- Songwriters: Michael Anthony; David Lee Roth; Alex Van Halen; Edward Van Halen
- Producer: Ted Templeman

Van Halen singles chronology
"Secrets" (1982)	"Jump" (1983)	"I'll Wait" (1984)

Audio sample
- file; help

Music video
- "Jump" on YouTube

"Jump" is a song by American rock band Van Halen. It was released in December 1983 as the lead single of their sixth studio album, 1984. It is Van Halen's most successful single, reaching number 1 on the US Billboard Hot 100. The song differs from earlier Van Halen songs in that it is driven by a keyboard riff. David Lee Roth dedicated the song to martial artist Benny "The Jet" Urquidez, of whom he was a student. In 2021, Rolling Stone ranked "Jump" at number 177 on its updated list of the "500 Greatest Songs of All Time".

"Jump" was one of the few Van Halen songs originally recorded by Roth that Sammy Hagar would perform live during his tenures with the band.

== Writing and composition ==
The synth line was written circa 1981 by Eddie Van Halen, but it was rejected by the other members of the band. In 1983, producer Ted Templeman asked Roth to listen to the unused song idea. Riding around in the back of his 1951 Mercury, with band roadie Larry Hostler driving, Roth listened repeatedly to the tune. To come up with a lyric for it, he remembered seeing a TV news report the night before about a suicidal jumper. Roth thought that one of the onlookers at such an event would inevitably yell "go ahead and jump". Roth bounced this suggestion off Hostler who agreed it was good; however, instead of describing a potential suicide, the lyrics were written as an invitation to action, life and love. Roth later told Musician magazine that Hostler was "probably the most responsible for how it came out." The song is set in the key of C major, with the guitar solo in the key of B♭ minor. "Jump" has a moderate common time tempo of 129 beats per minute.

Ted Templeman recalls that "Jump" was recorded at Eddie Van Halen's newly constructed home studio. "Engineer Donn Landee and Ed put the track down alone in the middle of the night. We recut it once in one take for sonic reasons. Dave wrote the lyrics that afternoon in the backseat of his Mercury convertible. We finished all vocals that afternoon and mixed it that evening."

The keyboard part was performed on an Oberheim OB-Xa. Live performances began with Eddie's synthesizer solo "1984". During the reunion tour with Roth, the two songs were used for the band's encore.

According to Daryl Hall of Hall & Oates, "[Eddie] Van Halen told me that he copied the synth part from 'Kiss on My List' and used it in 'Jump.' I don't have a problem with that at all."

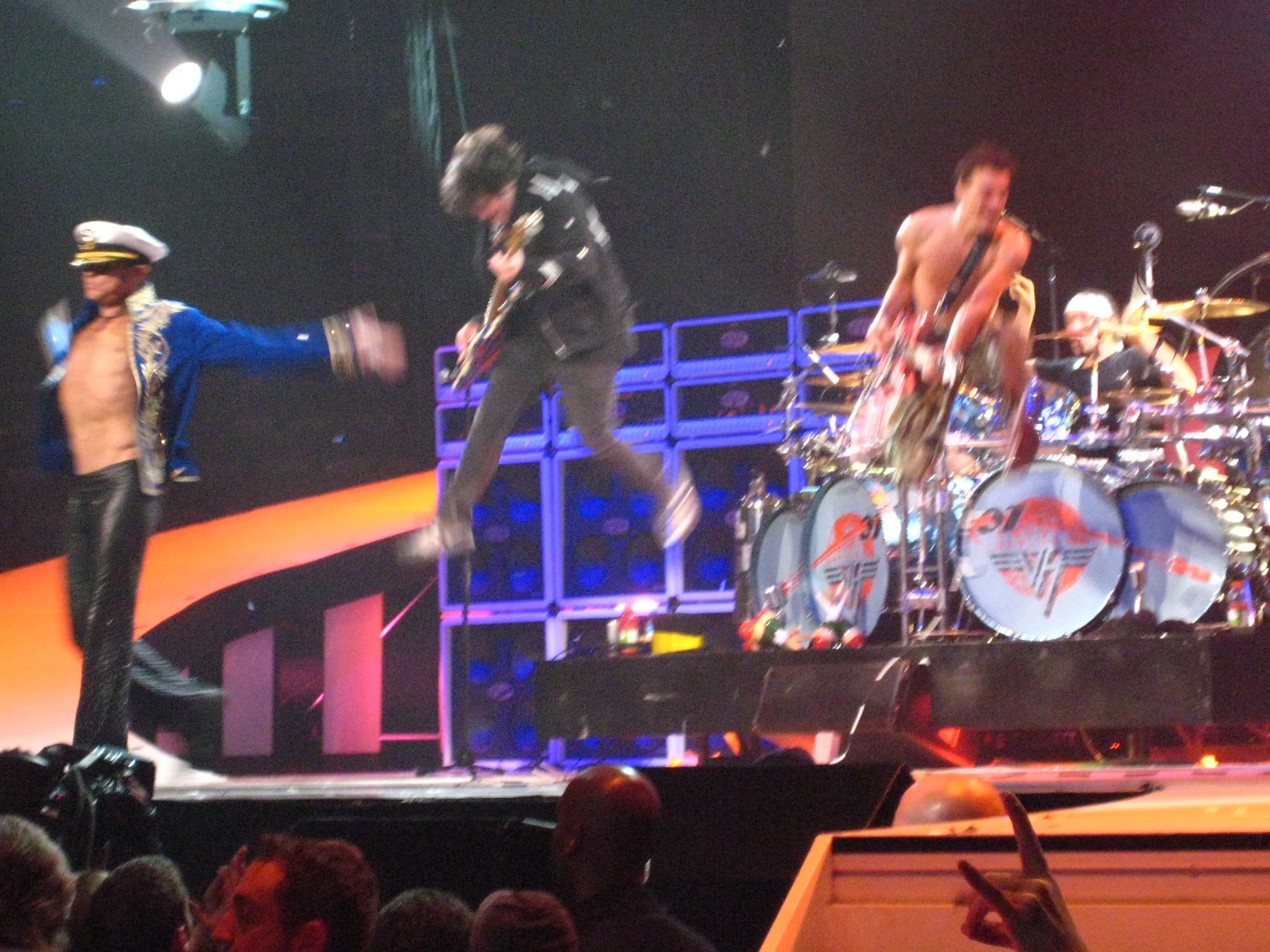
Van Halen performs "Jump", November 10, 2007.

Musically, the song was a departure from the band's original style, embracing more of a popular and radio-friendly sound. "Jump" has been described as a "synth-rocker", as a combination of hard rock and pop, as exemplifying pop rock of the 1980s, built on a classic rock foundation of repeated bass notes and having standard rock instrumentation, and as "a true rock masterpiece." The song has been also described as a pop/glam metal anthem.

== Music video ==
David Lee Roth seen jumping.

The music video for "Jump" was directed by Pete Angelus and David Lee Roth. It is a straightforward performance clip. It was nominated for three MTV Video Music Awards, and won "Best Stage Performance" for the video. The audio mix of the song in video version has an extra "Ah oh oh!" yell from Roth before the last chorus.

In the 2011 book MTV Ruled the World: The Early Years of Music Video by Greg Prato, Angelus discussed the video:

"Jump" really was just about personality, really. It was a very simple video. We shot it for nothing. David wanted to incorporate his karate-flipping — that he loved so much — into the whole thing. The initial concept was just to film them in a very simple live setting, and let the personalities show through. We did it very quickly. Seriously, I think that we probably spent more money on pizza delivery than we did on the video itself. But that was the intention — make it a very intimate, personal feeling, with a very big band.

== Sporting anthem ==
Since December 1986, before every home game at the Stade Vélodrome, Olympique de Marseille football players enter to Van Halen's song.

As part of the goal celebrations it is also played every time A.C. Milan scores a goal at their home ground San Siro.

The song is a staple at Detroit Pistons NBA games whenever a jump ball is called.

The original Winnipeg Jets of the National Hockey League played "Jump" on the arena PA system as the team came onto the ice. They used the song until the team's departure for Phoenix after the 1995–96 season. On the team's return in 2011, public outcry for use of the song initially was ignored, as the team's management company True North Sports and Entertainment wished to create a break with the past, considering the previous Jets a different organization from the new Jets (the former Atlanta Thrashers). However, in 2016 True North resumed the use of "Jump", this time as the team's goal song whenever the Jets score a goal at Bell MTS Place.

"Jump" was the theme song for the introduction of Chicago Cubs broadcasts on WGN-TV in 1984 and 1985, and was formerly what the team would run onto the field to before the top of the 1st inning.

== Reception ==
Upon its release, the UK publication Music Week felt that "Jump" catered to American sensibilities and characterized the song as "synthesizer pomp rock" with a "polite" vocal delivery from Roth. "Jump" was ranked number 15 on VH1's 100 Greatest Songs of the 1980s. The song was listed by The Rock and Roll Hall of Fame and Museum as one of the "500 Songs that Shaped Rock and Roll." Chuck Klosterman of Vulture.com ranked it the 16th-best Van Halen song, calling it "an articulation of unadulterated joy and the unprecedented power of six rudimentary keyboard chords arranged in the best possible sequence." Ahead of the 2012 Summer Olympics, the song was voted as the favourite sporting anthem, in a poll of members of PRS for Music.

== Appearances in film and television ==
The song was used in the soundtrack of the 2015 biopic Eddie the Eagle, being described by Blake Goble of Consequence of Sound as "the most on-the-nose use of Van Halen's 'Jump' ever committed to celluloid". "Jump" appears in the 2018 science fiction film Ready Player One. The song was used in the opening credits of the film and in the trailer for the film, and considered an "inspired choice" by Joe Reid of Decider.com.

The song was featured by McDonald's, in their United Kingdom 2023 Christmas television commercial, titled Fancy a McDonald's Christmas.

The song is heard in a scene of the 2005 film Herbie: Fully Loaded where the titular character competes in a demolition derby.

== Awards and nominations ==
"Jump" was nominated at the 27th Annual Grammy Awards (1984) in the "Best Rock Performance By a Duo or Group with Vocal" category, losing to Purple Rain by Prince & The Revolution.

== Armin van Buuren remix ==
Dutch DJ Armin van Buuren debuted his own private remix of "Jump" at the 2019 Miami Ultra Music Festival with David Lee Roth on stage. This remix was released through Big Beat Records on May 17, 2019.

== Personnel ==
- David Lee Roth – lead vocals
- Eddie Van Halen – guitar, synthesizer, backing vocals
- Alex Van Halen – drums
- Michael Anthony – bass, backing vocals

== Charts ==
=== Weekly charts ===
Chart (1984)	Peak position
Argentina (CAPIF)	8
Australia (Kent Music Report)	2
Austria (Ö3 Austria Top 40)	4
Belgium (Ultratop 50 Flanders)	28
Brazil (ABPD)	3
Canada Top Singles (RPM)	1
Canada Top Singles (The Record)	2
France (SNEP)	7
Ireland (IRMA)	2
Netherlands (Dutch Top 40)	29
Netherlands (Single Top 100)	34
New Zealand (Recorded Music NZ)	12
Paraguay (UPI)	2
Peru (UPI)	5
Sweden (Sverigetopplistan)	11
Switzerland (Schweizer Hitparade)	4
UK Singles (OCC)	7
Uruguay (UPI)	2
US Billboard Hot 100	1
US Billboard Dance Club Songs	17
US Billboard Mainstream Rock	1
Venezuela (UPI)	4
West Germany (GfK)	4

Chart (2020–2023)	Peak position
Japan Hot Overseas (Billboard Japan)	10
US Hot Rock & Alternative Songs (Billboard)	9

=== Year-end charts ===
Chart (1984)	Peak position
Australian (Kent Music Report)	28
Canadian RPM Top Singles	14
German Media Control Charts	44
South African Singles Chart	13
UK Singles (Gallup)	87
US Top Pop Singles (Billboard)	6
US Cash Box Top 100	5

== Certifications ==
Region	Certification	Certified units/sales
Denmark (IFPI Danmark)	Platinum	90,000^{‡}
Germany (BVMI)	Platinum	600,000^{‡}
Italy (FIMI)	Platinum	50,000^{‡}
Japan (RIAJ)	Gold	100,000^{*}
New Zealand (RMNZ)	3× Platinum	90,000^{‡}
Spain (Promusicae)	Platinum	60,000^{‡}
United Kingdom (BPI)	2× Platinum	1,200,000^{‡}
United States (RIAA)	Gold	1,000,000^{^}
^{*} Sales figures based on certification alone.^{^} Shipments figures based on certification alone.^{‡} Sales+streaming figures based on certification alone.

== Live version ==
"Jump (Live)"

Single by Van Halen

from the album Live: Right Here, Right Now
- B-side: "Love Walks In (Live)"
- Released: March 15, 1993 (UK)
- Genre: Hard rock
- Length: 4:27
- Label: Warner Bros.
- Songwriters: Eddie Van Halen; Alex Van Halen; Michael Anthony; David Lee Roth
- Producers: Van Halen, Andy Johns, Donn Landee

"Jump (Live)" was released as a single in 1993. The performance was recorded at the Selland Arena in Fresno, California, in May 1992, during the For Unlawful Carnal Knowledge Tour. "Jump" and the B-side, "Love Walks In", are the same versions that appear on the album Live: Right Here, Right Now. On the compact disc release of the single, "Mine All Mine" and "Eagles Fly" are previously unreleased live versions. All songs were produced by Van Halen and Andy Johns, except "Mine All Mine", which was produced by Van Halen and Donn Landee.

=== Charts ===
Chart (1993)	Peak position
Australia (Kent Music Report)	93
Ireland (IRMA)	13
Netherlands	12
Switzerland	36
UK Singles	26

=== Personnel (1993) ===
- Sammy Hagar – lead vocals
- Eddie Van Halen – guitar, backing vocals
- Alex Van Halen – drums
- Michael Anthony – bass, backing vocals
- Alan Fitzgerald – keyboards (offstage)

=== Track listings ===
==== 7" single ====
1. Jump (Live) – 4:27
2. Love Walks In (Live) – 5:14

==== CD single ====
1. Jump (Live) – 4:27
2. Love Walks In (Live) – 5:14
3. Mine All Mine (Live) – 5:24
4. Eagles Fly (Live) – 6:01

== Typography ==
The typeface used for the cover is Cristal, created by the French designer Rémy Peignot.

== See also ==
- List of Billboard Hot 100 number-one singles of 1984
- Clear Channel memorandum
