= Guitar Hero 5 =

2009 video game

- Developer: Neversoft (Note: Ported to PlayStation 2 by Budcat Creations and ported to Wii by Vicarious Visions)
- Publisher: Activision
- Series: Guitar Hero
- Platforms: PlayStation 2, PlayStation 3, Wii, Xbox 360
- Release: NA: September 1, 2009; EU: September 11, 2009; AU: September 16, 2009
- Genre: Rhythm
- Modes: Single-player, multiplayer

Guitar Hero 5 is a 2009 rhythm game developed by Neversoft and published by Activision. It is the fifth main installment and the ninth overall installment in the Guitar Hero series. The game was released internationally in September 2009 for the PlayStation 2, PlayStation 3, Wii and Xbox 360 consoles. Similar to the preceding title, Guitar Hero World Tour (2008), Guitar Hero 5 is geared towards playing in a four-person band experience, including lead and bass guitar, drums, and vocals. The game is available as a standalone title, allowing players to use existing compatible instrument controllers, and as a bundle that provides these controllers. Guitar Hero 5 adds several new features, such as drop-in/drop-out play, bands composed of any combination of available instruments, a Rockfest competitive mode consisting of several various scoring mechanisms, and both song-specific and general Challenges to unlock new avatars, clothing, and other extras in the game. Many of these changes were added to make the game a more social experience, allowing players across a range of skill levels to be able to play cooperatively and competitively against each other both locally and online. The PlayStation 2 version is based on Guitar Hero World Tour, using the same gameplay UI as Guitar Hero: Metallica (2009), Guitar Hero Smash Hits (2009), and Guitar Hero: Van Halen (2009), albeit with a different Rock Meter design.

Guitar Hero 5's track list contains 85 songs by 83 separate artists, and like previous Guitar Hero games, several musicians with works in the game have been modeled through motion capture for playable characters in the game, including Johnny Cash, Carlos Santana, Shirley Manson, Matt Bellamy, and Kurt Cobain. Players can also create their own character and instrument to play with. The game continues to support the user-created music studio introduced in World Tour through GHTunes, and additional downloadable content for the game was also made available. A majority of existing downloadable tracks from World Tour are forward-compatible with Guitar Hero 5, along with selected on-disc tracks from World Tour and Guitar Hero Smash Hits, and songs from the game could also be exported for a fee to play in its sequel, Guitar Hero: Warriors of Rock, and spin-off game Band Hero.

The game was well received by reviewers, who appreciated the improvements in the accessibility of the game, allowing players to immediately jump in and play without spending excessive time in the game's menus. The game also sold well, however, it sold about less than 50 percent of Guitar Hero: World Tour's sales, specifically selling 1.2 million copies across all platforms. Improvements to both the Career and competitive multiplayer modes were also highlights of the game. However, the game's track list was considered to be too broad, and controversy arose over the ability to use the avatar of Kurt Cobain to perform in any other song within the game.

== Gameplay ==
Gameplay in Guitar Hero 5 is similar to previous games in the series. Using a special game controller, players attempt to match scrolling notes as they appear on screen along a note track to mimic the playing of rock music and other songs. Hitting correct notes in time with the music increases the player's score and builds up the performance meter, while missing notes will cause the meter to drop. Should the meter fall below a certain threshold, the song will end prematurely with the player booed off the stage by a virtual audience. Correctly hitting ten consecutive notes will add to the player's score multiplier by one, up to a maximum of four times the original multiplier. Specially marked sections of the song, if completed correctly, help to build up Star Power, which can then be activated through an action with the controller to further double the current multiplier (up to 8x).

As with Guitar Hero World Tour, Guitar Hero 5 supports the playing of lead and bass guitar through guitar controllers, drums through a drum controller, and vocals through a microphone. Players can also play in groups of up to four local or remote players to form a band, co-operatively playing through a song. Whereas in World Tour, a band could only have one of each instrument, Guitar Hero 5 allows players to arrange for any combination of instruments, including all four players on the same instrument if they so choose. While playing in a band, Star Power is now tracked separately for each player, as opposed to collectively for the band as in World Tour. A new play mechanic called "Band Moments" will require all members of the band to play sections of a song successfully to gain rewards, both in a temporary scoring multiplier and visual effects on screen. The Band Revival meter will appear when a player fails out of the song, requiring the other band members to play well as a group together in order to bring the failed player back into the game. Failing to do so will end the song prematurely.

=== Game Modes ===
Guitar Hero 5 allows players to start in a Band Lobby from where they can then launch into any of the game's modes, add other local and remote players to a party, and switch between the game modes without having to leave the party or lobby, a significant change in response to the difficulties players found in World Tour. The game supports a Career mode (described below), a Quickplay mode, where players can create a set list of numerous songs and play through them. All songs on disc and through downloadable content are immediately available to play in this mode. The game also carries over the competitive modes from previous Guitar Hero games.

Two new multiplayer modes are in the game. The first is a "Party Play" mode, which is immediately launched once the game is started. During "Party Play", the game will automatically play randomly through the available songs. At any time, players can jump in with any instrument and start playing that song after selecting their difficulty and handedness; additional players can also jump in, drop out, or change their difficulty levels once someone is playing in this mode. The second feature is a "RockFest" mode, which can be played by four players locally or eight online, with several sub-modes that influence how the game is played and scored. In general, each song is divided into roughly 30-second long sections, and players earn points for their performance over that section based on the specific mode. These points are shown to all players to know how they are faring against the others. Players are able to create a playlist in Rockfest and assign a different mode to each song. The RockFest submodes include:

- "Momentum": Starting at Medium difficulty, players can increase their difficulty and score more points by hitting twenty consecutive notes, but will fall back in difficulty if they miss three notes in a row.
- "Streakers": Points are awarded for making "streaks" a series of consecutive notes, with the value further increasing for longer streaks.
- "Perfectionist": For each section of a song, players are ranked by the percentage of correct notes hit, with the top player getting the most points.
- "Do or Die": A player is forced to wait out until the next section if they miss three notes in the current section of the song.
- "Elimination": After each section of a song, the lowest scoring player is eliminated. However, if the scoring player decided to stay in, they may do so.
- "Pro Face-Off": A standard score attack mode, with the highest score winning points.

=== Career mode and Challenges ===
Guitar Hero 5 features a combined single- and multi-player (both off- and on-line) Career mode similar to Guitar Hero: Metallica. Songs in the game are distributed across 13 venues, with all but the first locked at the start. Each venue contains 5 or more specific songs and 1 or more special sponsored gigs, each with Challenges that can be completed along with playing through the song. To unlock the other venues, the players must collect a number of stars based on their performance playing individual songs, with each song offering up to 9 stars: up to 5 for the general scoring performance, an additional star for a perfect performance, and up to 3 for completing the song's Challenge. Players share the benefits of earning stars for their own respective profiles, thus, a player that may have difficulty completing one song on their own could join with a band that is able to complete it, benefiting from the gain in stars should they then play by themselves or with another group.

Guitar Hero 5 introduces both song-specific and open-gig Challenges that offer the player more rewards for completing certain feats while playing a song. This screenshot shows the Challenge for the song "Gamma Ray" by Beck.

Guitar Hero 5 introduces Career mode Challenges, that are either tied to specific songs, or allow players to select a song to meet the Challenge requirement in "open gigs". These were created by Neversoft to allow the developers to take advantage of unique features of many of songs and provide another layer of gameplay, according to Neversoft's Brian Bright. Each Challenge features three possible completion levels—Gold, Platinum, and Diamond, mimicking the music recording sales certification levels—with Diamond being the most difficult to complete. The song-specific challenges include both instrument-specific challenges, such as correctly vocalizing the repeated "Fame" lyric at the end of David Bowie's "Fame" as it moves down in pitch, and more general scoring or performance challenges on either specific instruments or for the whole band. Open gig Challenges are presented by sponsors within the game, and are based on performance aspects such as scoring a certain number of points using Star Power or using the guitar controller's whammy bar continuously for a length of time. These allow the player to select any song to complete, with some songs potentially being better suited for completing that challenge. The progress towards these Challenges is shown in-game by a record meter that appears when the challenge is active, and fills up similarly to the overall scoring meter as the player successfully completes towards the challenge. Higher completion levels, particularly Diamond, may only be possible by playing the Expert difficulty of a song, but players can take advantage of the mid-song difficulty adjustment feature to complete these if needed.

All players are awarded for completing a challenge if one of the members is able to do so, and will be reflected in the individual players' career progress. in addition, players can unlock new avatars, outfits, and other content by completing challenges. The rewards of the challenges are used to replace the previous in-game money reward in previous Guitar Hero games.

However, the PlayStation 2 version does not include this challenge feature. Rather than doing the challenges to unlock avatars/content, all one must do is complete the gig by successfully completing all songs. Not all gigs have content to unlock, rather just those to which a particular unlockable applies (for example the Johnny Cash gig allows Johnny Cash to be unlocked as a playable avatar).

=== Music studio ===
The Music Studio feature, which allows players to create their own songs and distribute them through the "GHTunes" music service, has been improved. The GHMix2.0 mode allows one to precisely create songs up to 10 min, and includes pre-defined sample tracks that can be modified on a note-by-note basis as desired. The new Jam mode lets the players select one of several standard pre-set rhythms and then play along with it on the instrument controllers in a free-form mode; however, players can then capture any segment of this music and move it to the Mix mode to compile a song. User songs are then uploaded and downloaded through the GHTunes mode of the Music Studio. While songs that violate copyright will still be removed from the service, Neversoft will be less aggressive about this and will rely more on user feedback on such issues. The PS2 version does not support this feature.

=== Characters and customization ===
After three years of negotiations, Kurt Cobain is a playable character in Guitar Hero 5.

Avatars of famous musicians are part of the game, performing for songs by that artist and available as unlockable characters. Notably, Kurt Cobain of Nirvana is a playable avatar; Activision had sought to gain permission to use Cobain's image for the game for three years, including obtaining the necessary agreements with Courtney Love, who controls Cobain's estate, and Dave Grohl and Universal Publishing, who control Nirvana's catalog. Cobain's avatar was designed with input from Love, who provided photos and videos for the design team to use, and emphasized how she would like Cobain to appear, starting from his appearance in "Smells Like Teen Spirit" and modifying it from there. The avatar includes the T-shirt design based on Daniel Johnston's "Frog" that Cobain had popularized. Johnny Cash is also a playable character, with tribute artist Terry Lee Goffee helping to provide motion capture for his character. Carlos Santana, Shirley Manson (of Garbage), and Matt Bellamy (of Muse) are also playable avatars, all of whom performed motion capture for their own avatars. There are also unlockable fictional characters like Skeleton, Golden God, Shadow, Frankenrocker, and Gerald Contest Winner. Though Activision approached Jon Bon Jovi to appear in the game, Bon Jovi turned down the offer. While the standard character creator is available for all versions of the game, the Xbox 360 version allows players to import their Xbox Live Avatar into the game, while the Freestyle mode on the Wii version of the game allows use of the players' Miis in the game. Nine of the characters from previous installments return in this game. They all have a costume that they start with and 3 more can be unlocked by completing challenges. Doing this will unlock also new pieces of clothing for the costume to use for user generated rockers. Also, while Gibson no longer sponsors the game, other guitar manufacturers, like Ibanez, ESP, Paul Reed Smith and Schecter, lent the likenesses of their instruments, allowing for new combinations on assembling custom guitars and basses. For the first time, also, sponsored clothing pieces can be used in customization (these being shoes from Vans, Dr. Martens and Converse) There is no money in the game leaving everything available to use, including unlockables. Instruments can also be unlocked to use. Also some clothing now can be changed in style. There are four styles for each; the one shown, two others that were separate items in previous games (with exceptions), and one new one (with exceptions). Pregenerated characters outfits can only be changed and users can only decide which outfit they wear. However they can still edit their instruments. Virtual avatars of the real life rockers can also not be changed in any way, including instruments.

=== Console-specific variations ===
The Wii version of the game, developed by Vicarious Visions, is "full feature parity" with the Xbox 360 and PlayStation 3 versions, including support for up to eight players online, each possibly on their own console. Guitar Hero 5 is the first Wii game to support high capacity SD cards, allowing up to about 800 songs to be stored on a 32 GB card. While existing Wii Guitar Hero games allow players to purchase downloadable content one song at a time, Guitar Hero 5 includes the ability to download complete albums and song packs. Players are also able to manage the content of their Wii memory cards through the game's interface. The game does not require players to enter game-specific Friends Codes, but instead uses the global Wii address book to locate friends. The "Mii Freestyle" mode, introduced in World Tour, is also present, and with changes to address some of the issues with less-skilled players trying to play well together. A "Guitar Hero Nintendo Ecosystem" is introduced in Guitar Hero 5, letting the Wii version communicate with the Nintendo DS, including a stage manager/video editor DS controller feature in conjunction with the Mii Freestyle mode, and a new game mode called "Roadie Battle". In Roadie Battle, four players play as two teams; each team has one player performing on an instrument through the Wii, while the other player uses a DS to connect to the Wii and act as the roadie. During play, the roadie players attempt to sabotage the other team by completing mini-games on the DS that affect the other team's music performance in a manner similar to Guitar Hero III's Battle Mode. These can only be cleared by the other DS player performing another mini-game.

The PlayStation 2 version of the game, developed by Budcat Creations, features less functionality in comparison to other versions, as it uses the same engine from Guitar Hero: World Tour, with the same HUD style as Guitar Hero: Metallica. Besides lacking online play or downloadable content, the game does not include drop-in/drop-out play, multiplayer "RockFest", nor song challenges. A multitap cannot be used to expand the number of controller ports, limiting the game to two guitars, one drum set and one microphone, although the game does support both USB and controller-port guitars.

== Development ==
Four player gameplay where all four are playing the same instrument on three different difficulties

The fifth main entry to the Guitar Hero series was announced in December 2008, with confirmation of its release by the end of 2009 coming in May 2009, along with the announcement of other new Guitar Hero titles. Some industry analysts questioned whether the proliferation of Guitar Hero games would soon glut the market. Guitar Hero spokesman Eric Hollreiser said consumer research showed continued strong demand for the various versions.

The Party Play mode was inspired by recognizing that past Guitar Hero games made it difficult to jump into without maneuvering through a number of menus and selection screens. The mode was designed to be used at social gatherings, and was adopted to use whatever instrument controllers that players already had available, thus allowing for various other combinations beyond the standard four-person band. This aspect of the game was then brought to the other band modes to allow the game to remain flexible.

A new guitar controller was developed for Guitar Hero 5, sold with bundles with the game though the option for standalone versions has not yet been determined. Like other Guitar Hero controllers, the guitar-shaped unit features five colored fret buttons on the neck of the guitar, a strum bar to mimic the act of strumming, a whammy bar to alter the pitch of a note, and additional buttons specific to the game console for maneuvering through the game's menus. The unit is mostly a redesign of the World Tour model with a new red finish and includes the touchpad that is farther up the neck of the controller, allowing the player to play notes via tapping or to slide along its surface for specially marked sections on the note track. The Guitar Hero 5 unit features a more accurate and responsive touchpad due to it being tracked digitally and with added tactile responses, a more accurate strum bar, and a controller finish that makes it easier to handle with sweaty hands. The game remains compatible with previous Guitar Hero game controllers as well as those from Rock Band and selected other rhythm games.

=== Promotion ===
As part of the game's early promotion, a scavenger hunt contest was announced in the last week of May 2009. Players would need to search for articles on specific game-related sites to find information on the bands that are to be in Guitar Hero 5, and then enter those bands at the game's official website for a chance to win a series of concert tickets in their area. Through this promotion, a large number of artists in the final track list were revealed.

A viral video in late July 2009 announced the last handful of songs for the game features four naked women walking down a public street, with black censor bars used to cover their bodies but also used to announce the song names. The video attracted the anger of Bill O'Reilly, calling the video "shameless" and the models as "pinheads".

For the month of September 2009, players in the US that purchase Guitar Hero 5 would be able to redeem a code with the game to receive a free copy of Guitar Hero: Van Halen prior to its retail release with the packaging's offer sticker (printable if lost), a copy of the receipt and a barcode received upon registration. Also in the UK, when pre-ordering Guitar Hero 5 on various websites you would receive a free copy of Guitar Hero World Tour when requested.

A television commercial was filmed at the Playboy Mansion and was featured in the 29 November 2009 episode of The Girls Next Door.

== Soundtrack ==
Guitar Hero 5 features 85 songs by 83 different artists. Tracks from 30 artists represent their "music-rhythm video game debut". Brian Bright, project director for the game, has called the track list "fresh", with 25% of the songs released in the last 18 months, and more than 50% from the current decade. Unlike previous versions of the Guitar Hero series, where players must work through a career mode to unlock all the songs in the game, all songs in Guitar Hero 5 are unlocked and available to play in any mode from the start,

Bright noted that previously, while "Under Pressure" by Queen and David Bowie was always a song they wanted in Guitar Hero, they could not find the masters for it. However, for Guitar Hero 5, the masters have since "magically appeared" and are part of the game's track list. For Nirvana's "Lithium", the master recordings did not have the appropriate tracks to build the note track from, and they opted to use the live version of the song from the 1992 Reading Festival, notably famous for Cobain appearing on a wheelchair at first amid rumors of his failing health, but shown to be a ruse as Cobain took the stage and celebrated the recent birth of his daughter Frances Bean. The song "You and Me" by Attack! Attack! was a result of the band winning a competition to be included in the game.

In addition to on-disc songs, Guitar Hero 5 is the first game in the series to reuse content from previous games. All but 6 (the Jimi Hendrix songs) of the 158 World Tour downloadable content songs can be imported into Guitar Hero 5 at no cost. Additionally, 35 songs from World Tour, 21 songs from Guitar Hero Smash Hits, and 61 songs from Band Hero can be imported into the game after paying a small transferring fee; more songs from these games may be made available to Guitar Hero 5 at a later date (including World Tour tracks.) The importing process for World Tour and Smash Hits content requires downloading of the content, as these tracks have been recreated with support for Guitar Hero 5's new gameplay features such as Band Moments. All such imported songs are also playable in Band Hero. Sixty-nine of the Guitar Hero 5 tracks can be imported into Band Hero. In addition, 39 of the tracks from Guitar Hero: Metallica are importable into Guitar Hero 5 and Band Hero. Since the September 2010 release of the sequel Guitar Hero: Warriors of Rock, no additional songs have been made available for DLC and it is unlikely any additional songs will ever be offered for Guitar Hero 5.

== Reception ==
Reception

Aggregate scores
| Aggregator | Score |
|---|---|
| GameRankings | 86.75% |
| Metacritic | (PS2) 71/100 (PS3) 86/100 (X360) 85/100 (WII) 89/100 |

Review scores
| Publication | Score |
|---|---|
| 1Up.com | A |
| Destructoid | (PS3/X360) 8/10 |
| Eurogamer | 9/10 |
| Game Informer | 8.5/10 |
| GameRevolution | (PS3) 6/10 |
| GameSpot | (X360) 8.5/10 |
| GameSpy | 4.5/5 |
| GamesRadar+ | (PS3/X360) 4.5/5 |
| GameZone | (PS3) 8/10 (WII) 8.7/10 |
| Giant Bomb | (PS3/X360) 4/5 |
| IGN | (PS2) 4.5/10 (PS3/X360) 8.9/10 (WII) 9.3/10 |
| Nintendo World Report | (WII) 9/10 |
| The Guardian | (PS3/X360/WII) 3/5 |
| VideoGamer.com | (PS3/X360/WII) 9/10 |

Guitar Hero 5 was well received upon release. Seth Schiesel of The New York Times called Guitar Hero 5 "the most enjoyable Guitar Hero game in several years" and "generally well-tuned, often exhilarating rock 'n' roll experience". Keza MacDonald of Eurogamer commented that there is "just nothing wrong" with Guitar Hero 5, given the various stumbling blocks the developers had made from previous iterations of the game, and the way the developers have continued to find new additions to the game. Reviewers greatly appreciated the new features in the game to make it easier to jump in and play music, from the simplification of the menu system to the availability of every song in all the game modes from the start. Erik Brudvig of IGN considers the menu change to be "one of the best things that Neversoft has done", although the menus are a minor part of the game, it removes much of the frustration with the World Tour and other previous Guitar Hero games' menu systems. Arthur Gies of GameSpy noted that by simplification of the interface, "Neversoft stripped Guitar Hero down to what works and built up from there". Reviewers appreciated the immediate launch of the game's Party Mode once the player put the disk in the system and the ability to jump right into that song through the new menus, and considered this to help make the game enjoyable for social gatherings. Chris Watters of GameSpot considered this mode to be "accessible, welcoming, and delightfully low key". The changes in Career mode, in which the players need not stick to the same instrument or difficulty throughout, was well appreciated. Brudvig appreciated how this allows the player to complete the Career mode without getting stuck on a song, having to go back to replay the Career mode on other instruments, and that with the addition of song Challenges, provides enough incentive to return to the songs to improve one's performance. The new multiplayer modes in Rockfest, which replaced more "arcadey" competitive modes, were considered a welcome replacement, as it allowed players of various skill levels to compete fairly against each other, making the game more friendly to the multiplayer experience. However, Matt Helgeson of Game Informer noted that despite the various RockFest modes, it "all comes down to hitting the notes correctly".

The track list, while well received for the most part, was found to be one of the weaker features. While Helgeson and others noted that the track list was "extremely diverse and for the most part well selected", this diversity was found to work against the game as well. Justin Haywald of 1UP.com noted that with the diverse track list, there would be a good chance players would find songs they liked, but at the same time, would also find songs they loathed. Brudvig noted that while "the goal was to include a bit of everything", the diversity of the track list ensures "that nobody will like everything on the disc". Gies noted that while the guitar difficulty progression in the Career mode was strong and better than in previous games, it leaves the vocals and drummer progression "all over the place", while Schiesel considered the vocals parts "somewhat rough" in comparison to The Beatles: Rock Band. Haywald noted that the singing portions of the game were still weak, with poor indicators to help the player's performance, and with the possibility of multiple vocalists performing at the same time, would make it hard for a player to keep track of his pitch. While reviews appreciated Activision's efforts to allow the importing of songs from previous games, the small number of tracks that were available at launch felt at odds with the impression that Activision had made of the process prior to the game's release. The improvements made in GHTunes were seen as "leaps and bounds" above the original offering in World Tour, though was still considered to be too unwieldy for average players.

There was some criticism of the Guitar Hero 5 cover art. Wired said "It's really boring" and "you can at least try to crank up some artistic creativity" but also stated "it's simple and easy to read." Jumped the Shark said "I'm not even sure that can be considered artwork. It looks like maybe they were supposed to put something on the case and then decided this was good enough."

On its week of release in the United Kingdom, Guitar Hero 5 was the most purchased title across all game systems, beating The Beatles: Rock Band which was also released during that same week in the country. United States sales of Guitar Hero 5 for the Xbox 360 reached 210,800 units on its first month of release, making it the 9th best selling title for the month, and 499,000 units total across all platforms were sold, comparable to World Tour's first month sales of 534,000 units. The total revenue for United States sales in September 2009 was $33 million, driving primarily by sales of the standalone copy of the game. The game sold just under 1 million copies worldwide by the end of 2009.

During the 13th Annual Interactive Achievement Awards, the Academy of Interactive Arts & Sciences nominated Guitar Hero 5 for "Family Game of the Year".

=== Kurt Cobain controversy ===
The inclusion of Kurt Cobain as a playable character in the game has been considered a "strange concept" by some reviewers, reflecting on the possible influence of commercialization pressures that played into Cobain's suicide. Shortly after the game's release, it was discovered that once players unlocked the Kurt Cobain Character Pack (as well as that for any other of the included famous musicians), they could use that character for any other song on disc, leading to what some have considered to be awkward virtual performances of Cobain singing songs from completely different genres; user-created videos of these performances that had attracted the attention to this issue have since been removed from video-sharing sites like YouTube by Activision. Previous games in the series that feature known musicians also allow for the use of their characters, once unlocked, in other songs, except for the case of Jimi Hendrix in Guitar Hero World Tour, the only posthumous artist to appear in the series prior to Guitar Hero 5. Some have seen this as a scar on Cobain's legacy; Jeff Gerstmann of Giant Bomb commented that "it's the near-mythic legacy he left behind and the way the Nirvana catalog has been protected from commercial interests over the years that makes this stuff so harsh" on his observation of such performances. Tim Walker of The Independent contrasted Cobain's "posthumous humiliation" to the appearance of virtual characters based on living artists that have appeared in rhythm music games, noting that deceased artists do not have the same fair consideration as live artists that can opt to license their images for such rhythm games. Seth Schiesel of The New York Times countered these arguments, noting that as long as no legal contracts were broken, Cobain and the other artists in the game "are too big and too important to be damaged in a cultural sense by mere inclusion in a video game".

On her Twitter account, Courtney Love expressed her anger at Cobain's representation in the game and threatened legal action alongside other companies that represent Cobain's intellectual property. Love further stated that she received no monetary arrangements for Cobain's appearance, in response to comments that believe Love had "sold out" to Activision and from a statement by Activision CEO Dan Rosensweig claiming that the Cobain estate has "cashed the cheque". Both Dave Grohl and Krist Novoselic have made statements disapproving the inclusion of Cobain as an unlockable character in the game and have requested that he be locked to only Nirvana songs, and Jon Bon Jovi, who had denied Activision's offer to include him in the game, supports their concerns about having his image be used to sing other artists' songs. In response to these statements, Activision claims it had secured all the proper publication rights for Cobain's image for the game. However, according to attorneys for Love, the contract was not meant to allow Activision to "denigrate his image". Joystiq noted that the crux of the legal issues revolve around the "right of personality", which is defined at the state level within the United States; these rights are presently held by Love due to her ownership of Cobain's estate, but may have been overridden in the contract with Activision. Band Hero suffered a similar issue, as the group No Doubt, avatars in that game, filed a lawsuit against Activision due to having their avatars be usable to play or sing any song in the game. Love stated to the magazine NME that she will be joining No Doubt in their lawsuit against Activision.
