= Crazy from the Heat (book) =

1997 autobiography by David Lee Roth

- Author: David Lee Roth
- Language: English
- Subject: Autobiography
- Genre: Non-fiction
- Publication date: 1997

Crazy from the Heat is the autobiography of former Van Halen lead vocalist and successful American solo artist David Lee Roth. The book, published in 1997, shares its name with Roth's debut release as a solo artist, 1985's Crazy from the Heat EP. The cover of the book shows Roth at the scene in the Seychelle Islands where the artwork for the EP was taken and striking a different pose, this time with a woman in his arms. A Princeton University graduate student recorded around 100 hours of Roth's monologues and transcribed them onto 1200 pages, from which the 359-page book was edited.

The book, written while Roth was a solo artist, tells of Roth's experiences not only as a member of Van Halen and a solo musician but also about his childhood (he was born in Bloomington, Indiana), rock climbing hobby and between recording/touring experiences. Roth also discusses how his Jewish background impacted his performances, and shows a photo of his fourth grade class, which according to the caption included Stephen Hawking, Oliver Stone, two members of Journey, and Al Gore (presumably this is an inside joke as Hawking, Stone and Gore are significantly older than Roth. Journey members Neal Schon and Steve Smith are however the same age as Roth). Towards the end of the book, Roth shares his view of the failed 1996 Van Halen reunion which yielded two new tracks on the album Best Of – Volume I and an appearance at that year's MTV Video Music Awards.

The book also features some of Roth's poetry which had never been officially published before. The book sold poorly and, despite reports to the contrary, never made it to The New York Times bestseller list.

Henry Rollins "worked closely" with Roth on the project and advised him on a spoken word album or tour, which has not yet materialized.

== In popular culture ==
- The book is mentioned in the Season 4 NewsRadio episode 'Chock' as being a favorite read of Bill McNeal, portrayed by Phil Hartman.
- The book appears in the How I Met Your Mother season 8 episode "The Over-Correction", where Barney Stinson is shown to possess a signed copy.
- The book is suggested for inclusion in the time capsule in the Parks and Recreation season 3 episode 'Time Capsule'.
