= Somebody Get Me a Doctor =

- Japanese single cover

Single by Van Halen

from the album Van Halen II
- B-side: "Women in Love..."
- Released: August 1979 (Japan)
- Recorded: December 1978 – January 1979
- Studio: Sunset Sound Recorders, Hollywood
- Genre: Hard rock
- Length: 2:52
- Label: Warner Bros.
- Songwriters: Michael Anthony; David Lee Roth; Alex Van Halen; Edward Van Halen
- Producer: Ted Templeman

Van Halen singles chronology
"Beautiful Girls" (1979)	"Somebody Get Me a Doctor" (1979)	"And the Cradle Will Rock..." (1980)

"Somebody Get Me a Doctor" is a 1979 song by Van Halen. It is the third song on their second album, Van Halen II.

The main riff for the song had already been composed by 1974, as evidenced by a home recording. "Somebody Get Me a Doctor" was one of the first Van Halen songs to be written, alongside "Runnin' with the Devil", and it was included on a 1976 demo arranged by Gene Simmons of Kiss. It was one of the early favorites of their stage show. However, it was not selected to be included on their first album by producer Ted Templeman. According to Eddie Van Halen, the song is about "being high and feeling good and ODing and stuff like that."

The song was only released as a single in Japan under the title "Hissatsu no Hard Love" (必殺のハード・ラヴ, Hissatsu no Hādo Ravu; lit. "Deadly Hard Love"). Author Chuck Klosterman ranked it the 23rd-best Van Halen song, calling it "something close to an adrenalized Tony Iommi riff with a Randy Rhoads solo jammed up the gullet." Rolling Stone included it on its list of the 20 Insanely Great Van Halen Songs Only Hardcore Fans Know, calling it "the loud and loose climax of Van Halen II" and praising David Lee Roth's vocals, saying he "has rarely squealed, squawked and screamed as exuberantly, as he does here while celebrating his own near demise." Rolling Stone Australia listed "Somebody Get Me a Doctor" as among Eddie Van Halen's top 20 guitar solos.
