= Dance the Night Away (Van Halen song) =

Single by Van Halen

from the album Van Halen II
- B-side: "Outta Love Again" "Spanish Fly" (Japan)
- Released: April 1979 (US)
- Recorded: December 1978
- Studio: Sunset Sound Recorders, Hollywood
- Genre: Hard rock; pop metal
- Length: 3:07
- Label: Warner Bros.
- Songwriters: Michael Anthony; David Lee Roth; Alex Van Halen; Edward Van Halen
- Producer: Ted Templeman

Van Halen singles chronology
"Ain't Talkin' 'bout Love" (1978)	"Dance the Night Away" (1979)	"Beautiful Girls" (1979)

Music video
- "Dance the Night Away" on YouTube

"Dance the Night Away" is a song by American hard rock band Van Halen, and written by its group members. It is the second song from their 1979 album Van Halen II. While the rest of the songs from this album had existed in various forms since their days doing demos and playing clubs, this song was possibly the only song written during the recording sessions for the album.

== Background ==
The band members conceived the song during the recording sessions while they were standing in a circle humming to each other. It was inspired by Fleetwood Mac's "Go Your Own Way". Eddie Van Halen purposefully left a guitar solo out of the final version of the song, replacing it instead with a riff of tap harmonics. David Lee Roth originally wanted to call the song "Dance, Lolita, Dance", but Eddie Van Halen convinced him that "Dance the Night Away" was more suitable and the chorus was changed to reflect that.

Roth claimed, during a 2006 performance in San Diego, California, that he wrote this song in tribute to an intoxicated woman who was having sex in the back of a truck and ran with her pants on backwards while escaping police officers into the bar where the fledgling band was playing. This was also mentioned at a 2006 performance in Detroit, Michigan.

== Reception ==
Billboard described "Dance the Night Away" as "a melodically driving rocker spiked by blaring guitar riffs, keyboards, bass and a powerful lead vocal. Cash Box said it was "more melodic" with fewer "guitar pyrotechnics" than previous Van Halen songs.

Record World praised the "slick guitar-percussion intro and break" and Ted Templeman's wall of sound production."

Chuck Klosterman of Vulture ranked it the third-best Van Halen song, praising Michael Anthony's background vocals and writing that "this song just makes people feel good."

== Charts ==
=== Weekly charts ===
Chart (1979)	Peak position
Canada (RPM)	28
US Billboard Hot 100	15

=== Year-end charts ===
Chart (1979)	Peak position
US Billboard Hot 100	95
