= Hot for Teacher =

1984 single by Van Halen

Single by Van Halen

from the album 1984
- B-side: "Little Dreamer"
- Released: October 1984 (U.S.); June 3, 1985 (UK)
- Recorded: 1983
- Studio: 5150 Studios, Studio City
- Genre: Glam metal; heavy metal; hard rock
- Length: 3:58 (single version); 4:44 (album version)
- Label: Warner Bros.
- Songwriters: Michael Anthony; David Lee Roth; Alex Van Halen; Edward Van Halen
- Producer: Ted Templeman

Van Halen singles chronology
"Panama" (1984)	"Hot for Teacher" (1984)	"Why Can't This Be Love" (1986)

Music video
- "Hot for Teacher" on YouTube

"Hot for Teacher" is a song by the American rock band Van Halen, taken from their sixth studio album, 1984. The song was written by band members Eddie Van Halen, Alex Van Halen, Michael Anthony and David Lee Roth, and produced by Ted Templeman. It was released as the fourth and final single from the album in October 1984, and was the final single released during the band's 1974–1985 era.

The song features Alex Van Halen's double bass drum performance and its music video features the band as both adults and young students. Unusual for a single, it begins with a 30-second drum solo, followed by another 30 seconds of instrumental introduction. The ending of this song comes from a studio demo from the band's club days, entitled "Voodoo Queen".

== Musical style ==
The song has been described as a mixture of glam metal, heavy metal, and hard rock. The song's drum solo introduction composed and performed by Alex Van Halen starts with a speedy double kick drum half-time shuffle reminiscent of drummer Billy Cobham's tune "Quadrant 4" from 1973's Spectrum album, then borrows from the manic boogie rock–style of drummer Simon Phillips on the Jeff Beck song "Space Boogie" (1980) with added tom drums.

=== The drum solo intro ===
The song starts with a roughly 30-second drum solo intro that then leads into the double kick shuffle groove; producer Ted Templeman originally attributed the intro to a "Lamborghini exhaust", while others suggested it was using a drum sequencer. In a breakdown video, Drumeo concluded that the intro is built on an electronically triggered Simmons drum kit: for the first 6 bars, Alex Van Halen plays various rudiments such as hertas and paradiddles on a Simmons pad, eventually adding electronically triggered double bass and rototoms.

== Music video ==
The music video (directed by Pete Angelus and David Lee Roth, and produced by Jerry Kramer and Glenn Goodwin, choreographed by Vincent Paterson with concept/treatment by Anthony Nasch) was filmed at John Marshall High School, with Phil Hartman performing the voice of Waldo, the video's protagonist. Waldo, an awkward boy with large glasses and a bow tie, is put on the school bus by his over-protective mother. He is terrified by the unruly kids on the bus; the driver played by Roth, tells him "si'down, Waldo!" as the opening drums begin. Along with Waldo, the "kid versions" of Van Halen face the trials and tribulations of grade school. Two models appear as teachers in the video, Donna Rupert (1981 Miss Canada pageant runner up), who plays the chemistry teacher, and Norwegian actress Lillian Müller, who plays the Phys Ed teacher. The Phys teacher tears off her dress to reveal a bikini while the chemistry teacher walks in the classroom wearing a bikini, to the cheers of the students. As the kids leave at the end of the school day, the bus driver (again played by Roth) picks them up in a yellow 1932 Ford Phaeton hot rod "school bus," the back of which is emblazoned with "Hot For Teacher." At the end of the video, the kids are shown to have grown up to become a gynecologist (Alex Van Halen), a sumo wrestler (Michael Anthony), a psychiatric hospital patient (Eddie Van Halen), and a game show host (Roth). Waldo's whereabouts and career are unknown but the video hints at him becoming a pimp, the total opposite of his child self. The entire video is intercut with scenes with the band members dressed in orange suits and dancing to the song under a disco ball.

An initial controversy arose when the video showed all the band members performing a quick crotch-grab during the "...so bad..." part of the chorus; at first, the 1980s NBC late-night show Friday Night Videos added black-box censor bars to the crotch-grabs but eventually relented and removed the black-box from their video.

One potentially controversial scene managed to go unnoticed for many years, until Angelus unveiled it in the 2011 book MTV Ruled the World: The Early Years of Music Video by Greg Prato: "One thing I remember about that video that a lot people don’t know or maybe didn’t see. When Dave turns into the television show host, we had an idea. I thought, 'You know ... there hasn’t been a really substantial urine stain on MTV. Ever, when you really think about it. So let’s pour a lot of water on David’s crotch. Let’s make it look like he really just pissed himself. And then let’s see if anyone sees it when we hand the video into the record company and MTV.' And nobody did! I know this sounds absolutely pathetic to say, but we probably pulled off the first and most substantial urine stain in the history of television. So we’ve got that going for us."

== Reception ==
Cash Box said that the song "shows [Van Halen] at their absolute zenith," saying that "multi-watt voltage surges through this speeding hard rock anthem, with Eddie Van Halen again proving why he is the best."

In 2009 it was named the 36th best hard rock song of all time by VH1. Chuck Klosterman of Vulture ranked it the sixth-best Van Halen song, calling it "the encapsulation of almost everything Van Halen is known for, all within the space of five minutes: Athletic drumming, an extended guitar introduction that transitions into a thick principal riff, vocals that are spoken more than sung, two interlocked solos, and lyrics that are technically demeaning but somehow come across as non-toxic and guileless."

== Personnel ==
- David Lee Roth – lead vocals
- Eddie Van Halen – guitar, backing vocals
- Alex Van Halen – drums, percussion
- Michael Anthony – bass guitar, backing vocals

== Charts ==
Chart (1984)	Peak position
Australia (Kent Music Report)	89
Canada Top Singles (RPM)	83
US Billboard Hot 100	56
US Mainstream Rock Airplay (Billboard)	24

Chart (2020)	Peak position
US Hot Rock & Alternative Songs (Billboard)	23

== Certifications ==
Certifications for Hot for Teacher
Region	Certification	Certified units/sales
New Zealand (RMNZ)	Gold	15,000^{‡}
^{‡} Sales+streaming figures based on certification alone.
