= Pete Angelus =

American music artist manager

Pete Angelus is an artist manager who has worked in the music business since 1975. During his career, he has worked with Van Halen, Jimmy Page of Led Zeppelin, Slash, Hall & Oates and has managed The Black Crowes since the release of their 1989 multi-platinum debut album, Shake Your Money Maker.

== Early years ==
Angelus came to Hollywood and applied for a job at The Whisky a GoGo as a lighting designer but the position was filled at the time. The secretary DeeDee Keel was impressed by his enthusiasm and offered him a job as a door man until the opportunity for lighting became available. Not long after Van Halen was so impressed with his work they asked him to go tour with them. He became known in the management when he designed and directed a light show for Van Halen in 1980, for their first world tour as a headline act, requiring 7 tractor-trailers for the lights. In addition to light and stage design, Angelus forayed into art direction for the band, influencing Van Halen's logo and early album covers, as well as designing much of the band's merchandise from 1979 to their breakup with Roth in 1985. Angelus became such a creative influence the members of the band, Eddie Van Halen, Alex Van Halen, David Lee Roth, and Michael Anthony referred to him as "the fifth member of Van Halen." Many of David Lee Roth's quips came from the tongue of Angelus (Note the opening of California Girls: "Thank Heaven for Little Girls, Maurice Chevalier, 1958" "And some of the other sizes, too Pete and Dave, 1985"). Roth, with whom Angelus had a falling out after managing his solo career for six years, did not acknowledge Angelus' work and partnership in his memoir.

As MTV became popular, his interest turned to video production, and he went on to direct some of the most well-known and most-played music videos of all time. Five times, the videos he directed were nominated for MTV "Video of the Year" status. Angelus was interviewed at length about the making of the classic Van Halen and David Lee Roth videos in the 2011 book, MTV Ruled the World: The Early Years of Music Video, by Greg Prato.

== Music videos ==
Angelus is credited with writing and directing the following videos:

Jump / Van Halen (1984)

- VH1 Top 100 Videos Of All Time
- MTV's Greatest Music Videos Ever Made

Hot for Teacher / Van Halen (1984)

- VH1 Video Hall of Fame 2002
- VH1 Top 20 Funniest Videos Ever Made
- VH1 Top 100 Videos Of All Time
- Playboy’s Top 15 Sexiest Videos of All Time

Just a Gigolo / David Lee Roth (1985)

- MTV Greatest Music Videos Ever Made
- VH1 Top 20 Funniest Videos Ever Made

California Girls / David Lee Roth (1985)

- VH1 Top 100 Videos Of All Time
- MTV Top 5 "Babe" Videos of All Time

Angelus also directed the following videos for The Black Crowes:

- Jealous Again
- Twice as Hard
- Hard to Handle (co-directed by Tom Trbovich)
- She Talks to Angels
- Thorn in My Pride
- Remedy

Angelus also made cameos in David Lee Roth's "Just a Gigolo," "Yankee Rose," and "Goin' Crazy!" videos.

== As a manager ==
He worked with such well-known label presidents as David Geffen, Tommy Mottola, Don Ienner, Rick Rubin, Mo Ostin and Clive Davis.

He was instrumental in creating the “Jimmy Page/ The Black Crowes: Live From The Greek” record and the “Tour of Brotherly Love” with The Black Crowes and Oasis.

Billboard Magazine referred to him as a “visionary.” A feature in The Album Network commented, “Angelus is a magician when it comes to artist development and the media…his creativity and success warrant the status he has earned as a legendary manager.”

INTERVIEW 1

BOOK MENTIONS 1
