= Margaret Young =

American singer (1891–1969)

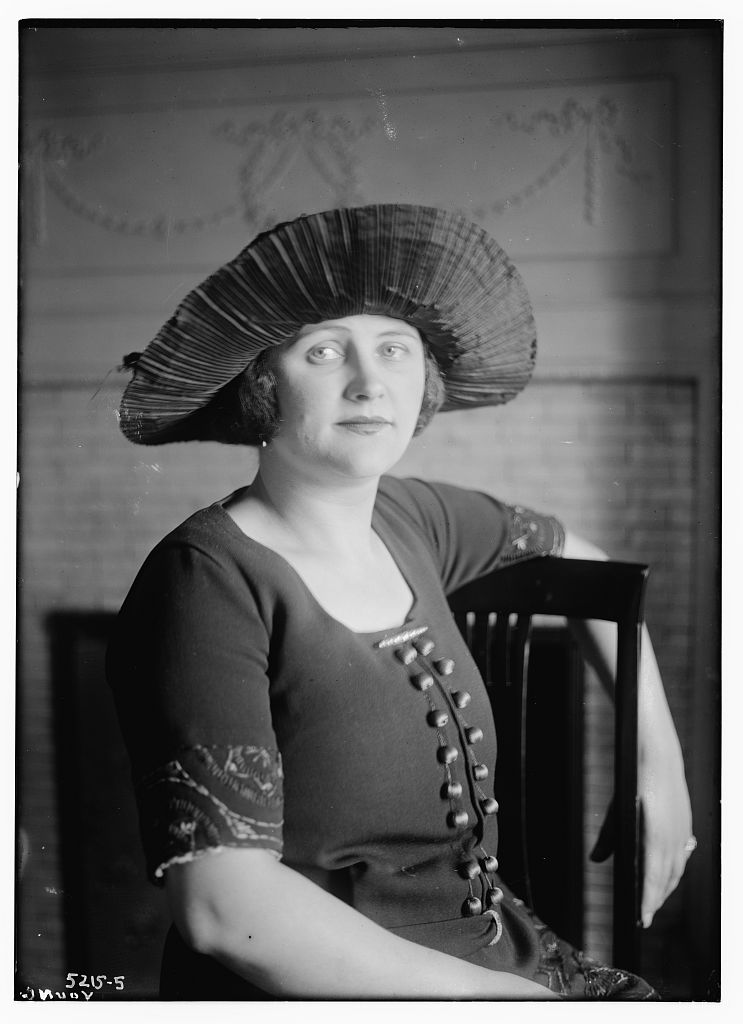
- Young in 1922

Background information
- Born: Margaret Youngblood; February 23, 1891; Detroit, Michigan, U.S.
- Died: May 3, 1969 (aged 78) Inglewood, California, U.S.
- Genres: Vaudeville, comedy
- Occupation: Singer
- Instrument: Vocals
- Years active: 1920–1930; 1949–1969
- Labels: Victor, Capitol, Brunswick

Margaret Youngblood (February 23, 1891 – May 3, 1969) better known by her stage name Margaret Young, was an American singer and comedian who was popular in the 1920s. Young is best known for her songs "Hard Hearted Hannah", "Lovin' Sam The Sheik Of Alabam'", "Way Down Yonder In New Orleans", and "Oh By Jingo!".

== Biography ==
She was born in Detroit, Michigan, on February 23, 1891. She had four sisters; three older and one younger.

Young began her professional career in Detroit, Michigan. She sang at theaters, dinner clubs, and on Vaudeville. Young first recorded commercially for the Victor Talking Machine Company in 1920. She recorded a series of records for Brunswick from 1922 through 1925 which sold well. She continued as a popular entertainer until the end of the decade.

Young came out of retirement to record for Capitol Records in 1949.

Her sister was married to composer Richard A. Whiting, some of whose songs she introduced, and her niece Margaret Whiting also would become a popular singer throughout the 1940s and 1950s.

Young died in Inglewood, California, aged 78 after a brief illness. She was buried next to her late sister, Eleanore (widow of composer Richard Whiting and mother of singer Margaret Whiting) and is interred at the Holy Cross Cemetery in Los Angeles.
