= Alex Van Halen =

American drummer (born 1953)

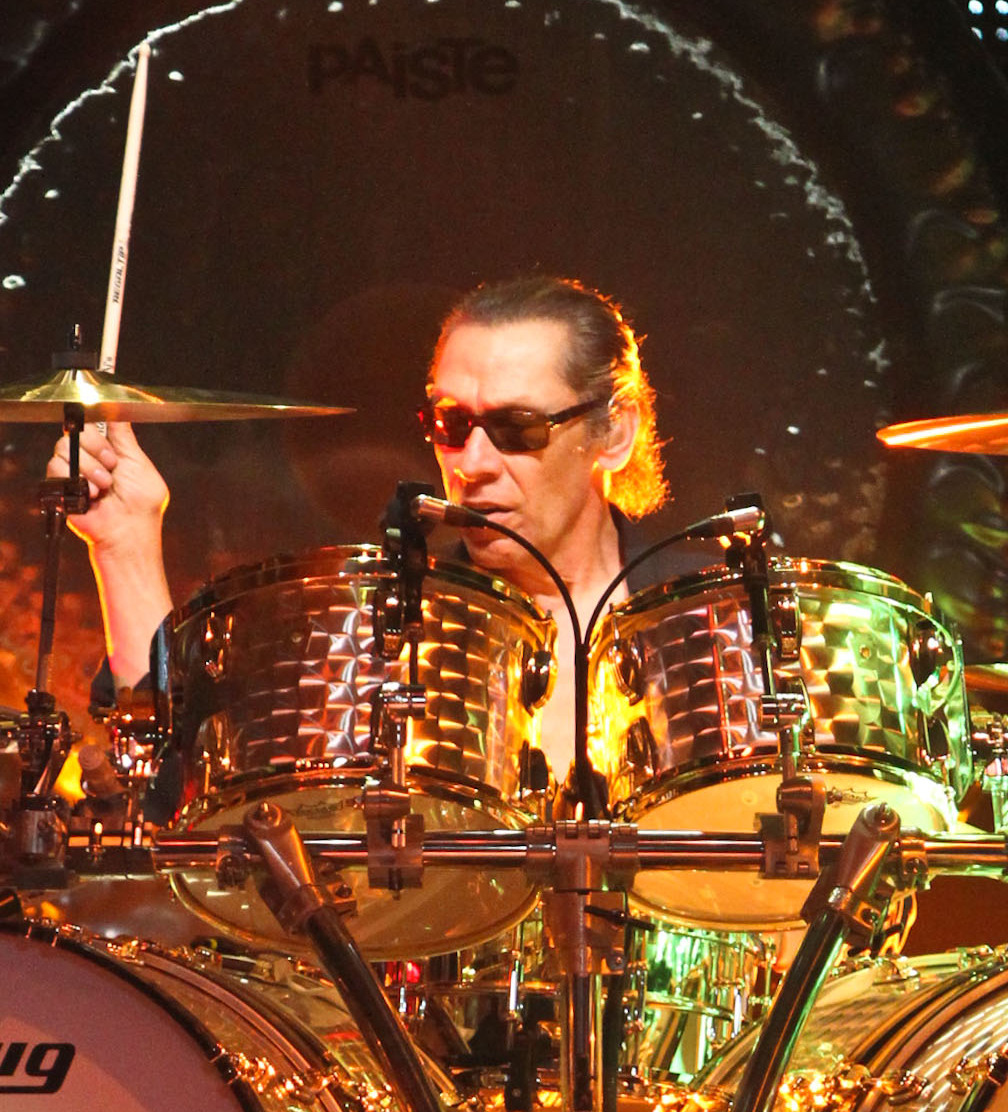
- Van Halen performing in 2012

Background information
- Born: Alexander Arthur van Halen; May 8, 1953 (age 73); Amsterdam, Netherlands
- Origin: Pasadena, California, U.S.
- Genres: Hard rock; heavy metal; glam metal
- Occupation: Musician
- Instrument: Drums
- Years active: 1962–2020, 2024–present
- Formerly of: Van Halen
- Spouses: Valeri Kendall (m. 1983, divorced); Kelly Carter (m. 1984; div. 1996); Stine Schyberg (m. 2000)
- Website: van-halen.com
- Relatives: Eddie Van Halen (brother); Wolfgang Van Halen (nephew)

Alexander Arthur Van Halen (/væn ˈheɪlən/ van HAY-len, Dutch: [aːlɛkˈsɑndər vɑn ˈɦaːlə(n)]; born May 8, 1953) is an American musician who was the drummer of the rock band Van Halen, which he formed with his younger brother Eddie Van Halen, who was the band's guitarist. Van Halen released 12 studio albums, and the brothers were the only two constant members during the band's existence. Noted for his technical prowess, speed, and power, Alex Van Halen is widely regarded as one of the greatest drummers of all time. In 2026 he was knighted in the Order of the Netherlands Lion for his contribution to music.

== Early life ==
Alex Van Halen was born in Amsterdam. The family name in Dutch is van Halen (with lower-case 'v') and is pronounced in Dutch as [vɑn ˈɦaːlə(n)]. His Dutch father, Jan van Halen (1920–1986), was an accomplished jazz saxophonist and clarinetist. His mother, Eugenia van Beers (1914–2005), was an Indo (Eurasian) from Rangkasbitung, Dutch East Indies (now Indonesia). Alex spent his early years in Nijmegen in the east of the Netherlands. The family moved to Pasadena, California, in 1962. The Dutch prefix "van" was capitalized by Alex's parents during the family's immigration to the US. Alex and his brother Eddie became naturalized U.S. citizens.

Both brothers were trained as classical pianists during childhood. Although Alex is known as a professional drummer, he began his musical aspirations as a guitarist, with his brother Eddie taking up drums. While Eddie was delivering newspapers to pay for his drum kit, Alex would practice playing on them. After spending some time playing Eddie's drum kit, Alex became more skilled than Eddie was as a drummer. After Eddie heard Alex's mastery of The Surfaris drum solo in the song "Wipe Out", he decided to learn to play the electric guitar. Alex was influenced by Budgie drummer Ray Phillips.

Alex, Eddie and three other boys formed a band called "The Broken Combs" while attending Hamilton Elementary School in Pasadena. Alex played saxophone in the band. When Eddie was in the fourth grade, they performed at lunchtime at the school.

In 1971, Alex graduated from Pasadena High School. He then took classes in music theory, scoring, composition and arranging at Pasadena City College for a short time. While at Pasadena City College, Alex met Michael Anthony and David Lee Roth.

== Career ==
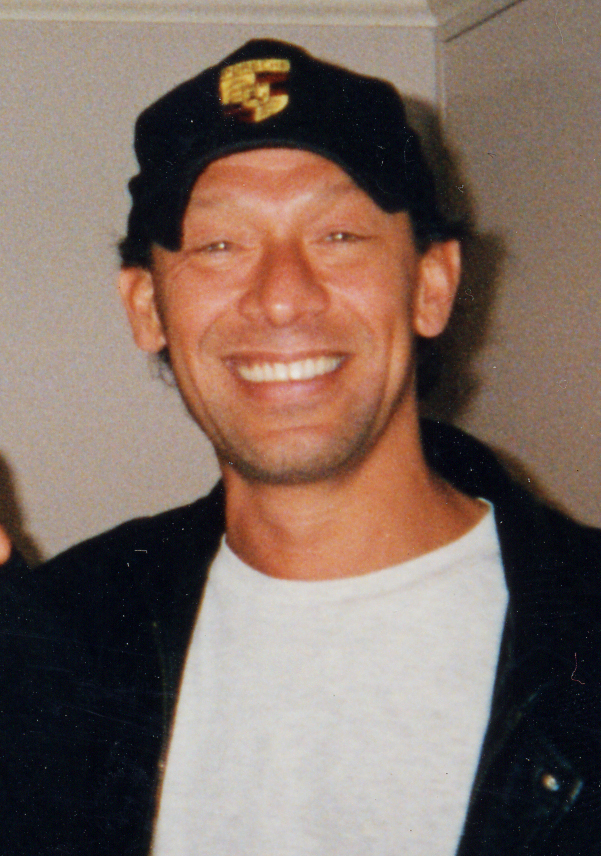
Alex Van Halen, c. 1997

Alex and Eddie Van Halen had several early bands before the formation of Van Halen. In addition to The Broken Combs, there were The Space Brothers, The Trojan Rubber Company, and Mammoth.

In 1972, the brothers formed Mammoth with Mark Stone on bass and Eddie on lead vocals. The band rented David Lee Roth's PA system for their shows. Soon after, Eddie became tired of singing lead and asked Roth to join the band as the lead singer. In 1974, since the name Mammoth was already taken by another band, the name was changed to Van Halen, and Stone was replaced by Michael Anthony. Roth has claimed that it was his idea to rename the band Van Halen, and that he actually named it after Alex. Alex handled managerial duties for the band during its early years. The band's 1978 self-titled debut album was released to much fanfare, influencing many musicians in hard rock. Van Halen later released 11 more studio albums. Van Halen disbanded a month after Eddie's death on October 6, 2020.

Although the term "brown sound" is generally associated with Eddie's guitar, it was actually coined by Alex to refer to the sound of his snare drum.

Alex played keyboards alongside his brother Eddie on the instrumental "Respect the Wind". The song, co-written by the two, was released on the Twister soundtrack and earned the Van Halen brothers a Grammy Award nomination for Best Rock Instrumental Performance.

In June 2024, Alex auctioned off all of the drum gear he had in storage.

Alex released a book called Brothers on October 22, 2024 and commenced a three-date promotional tour.

Alex is widely regarded as one of the greatest drummers of all time.

In September 2026, Alex was knighted in the Order of the Netherlands Lion at a ceremony in Nijmegen, the city where he spent his early years. The honor was presented by the mayor of Nijmegen on behalf of the King; the order is awarded to "those with merits of a very exceptional nature for society". Speaking at the ceremony, he said he was "very grateful" and that such institutions add "a dignity and a gravity to what we do". He also signed Nijmegen's Boek van de Stad (Book of the City), a register of notable visitors that includes Bruce Springsteen and King Willem-Alexander.

== Influences ==
Alex's main influences include Billy Cobham, Ginger Baker, Keith Moon and John Bonham. He has cited jazz drummer Buddy Rich's work as having had an early and lifelong impact.

== Personal life ==
Alex married Valeri Kendall in June 1983 after a two-year engagement. The marriage ended in divorce two months later. In 1984, he married Kelly Carter. Their son, Aric Van Halen, was born in 1989. The couple divorced in August 1996. Carter was sued by the band Van Halen in 2013 over her commercial use of the 'Van Halen' surname. The case was settled in 2015. Aric Van Halen was a member of the cross country and track and field teams of the University of Colorado, earning all-American honours in both sports; he competed in the Olympic trials for the steeplechase in 2016.

Alex married Stine Schyberg in 2000. He has said that Schyberg helped him to overcome drug addiction during the 1990s. Schyberg is the mother of Alex's son, Malcolm Van Halen.

Alex is the paternal uncle of musician Wolfgang Van Halen.

Due to years of playing loud music, Alex has significant hearing loss in both ears. "In 1995 Alex Van Halen complained to his stage engineer Jerry Harvey about it. He could no longer hear the band onstage and was putting his hearing in jeopardy. Harvey built a simple in-ear monitor using two speakers that were originally designed for a pacemaker. He tuned one for bass, the other for treble."

== Discography ==
Other projects

- "Respect the Wind" for Twister (1996) with Eddie Van Halen

=== Other Appearances ===
- Tone Lōc - Wild Thing (1988)(Drums sampled from Van Halen's 1978 song Jamie's Cryin')

== Books ==
- Van Halen, Alex (October 22, 2024). Brothers. New York: Harper. ISBN 9780063265707. OCLC 1420338108.
