= That Old Black Magic (album) =

Studio album by Keely Smith
- Released: 1965
- Recorded: 1965
- Genre: Traditional pop, jazz
- Label: Reprise R6175
- Producer: Jimmy Bowen

Keely Smith chronology
Keely Smith Sings the John Lennon—Paul McCartney Songbook (1964)	That Old Black Magic (1965)	I'm in Love Again (1985)

Professional ratings
Review scores
Source	Rating
Record Mirror	4/5 stars

That Old Black Magic is a 1965 album by Keely Smith, with arrangements by Ernie Freeman.

== Reception ==
The initial Billboard magazine review from 4 September 1965 commented that "The famous deadpan one re-creates her hits of the past and brings new excitement and color to the wildest performance of her career".

== Track listing ==
1. "I've Got the World on a String" (Harold Arlen, Ted Koehler) – 2:23
2. Medley: "When You're Smiling"/"The Sheik of Araby" (Larry Shay, Mark Fisher, Joe Goodwin/Harry B. Smith, Francis Wheeler, Ted Snyder) – 1:42
3. "I Gotta Right to Sing the Blues" (Arlen, Koehler) – 3:25
4. "The Birth of the Blues" (Ray Henderson, Buddy G. DeSylva, Lew Brown) – 2:47
5. "Oh, Baby" (K. Smith, P. Smith) – 2:22
6. "That Old Black Magic" (Arlen, Johnny Mercer) – 2:43
7. Medley: "Just a Gigolo"/"I Ain't Got Nobody" (Irving Caesar, Leonello Casucci, Julius Brammer/Spencer Williams, Roger A. Graham) – 3:32
8. "Autumn Leaves" (Joseph Kosma, Mercer) – 3:00
9. "Buona Sera" (Peter De Rose, Carl Sigman) – 2:51
10. "Pennies from Heaven" (Arthur Johnston, Johnny Burke) – 2:21

== Personnel ==
- Keely Smith – vocals
- Ernie Freeman – arranger
- Jimmy Bowen – producer
