= The Wildest! =

Studio album by Louis Prima
- Released: October 1956; August 13, 2002 (reissue)
- Recorded: April 19 and April 20, 1956; September 13, 1956 (bonus tracks)
- Studio: Sahara Casino (Las Vegas); Capitol (Hollywood)
- Genre: Swing; jump blues
- Length: 32:00
- Label: Capitol
- Producer: Voyle Gilmore (1956); Michael Cuscuna (2002)

Louis Prima chronology
Breaking It Up! (1953)	The Wildest! (1956)	The Call of the Wildest (1957)

The Wildest! is an album by Louis Prima, first released in 1956. It features singer Keely Smith with saxophonist Sam Butera and the Witnesses. It is considered an innovative mixture of early rock and roll, jump blues and jazz as well as eccentric humor.

== Background ==
Louis Prima was a well-known 1930s and 1940s trumpeter and singer who had a moderate series of hit singles at that time. He initially gained popularity in his home city of New Orleans and later in New York. By 1954, Prima had joined a Louisiana band led by Sam Butera. With Prima's stage partner and wife Keely Smith, he, Butera and the Witnesses secured a gig at the Sahara Hotel and Casino in Las Vegas. They soon became the most popular act in that city.

On April 19, 1956 the band gathered at the casino lounge to record tracks for the album. Capitol Records attempted to retain Prima's "in person" performance and spirit to capture what he referred to as "three o'clock in the morning at the Sahara" with the group. One of the songs recorded, "Jump, Jive, an' Wail" would become a hit through Brian Setzer's cover version in 1998.

The Wildest! was reissued on August 13, 2002, by producer Michael Cuscuna. The album contains four additional tracks recorded on September 13, 1956 as well as new liner notes by the producer.

== Reception ==
Allmusic expressed that "The Wildest! is the gem of Louis Prima's catalogue. None of his other efforts transcend its raunchy mix of demented gibberish, blaring sax, and explosive swing, which rocked as hard as anything released at the time." The album is considered a collection of Prima's signature recordings.

The Wildest! is noted in the book 1001 Albums You Must Hear Before You Die. In it, critic Will Fulford-Jones states, "this is simply irrepressible music that more than matches its cover shot. Prima is joyous, rumbustious, and irresistible."

== Track listing ==
Side 1
No.	Title	Writing	Length
1.	"Medley: Just a Gigolo / I Ain't Got Nobody (and Nobody Cares for Me)"	Leonello Casucci, Julius Brammer, Irving Caesar / Spencer Williams, Roger A. Graham	4:42
2.	"(Nothing's Too Good) For My Baby"	Mack H. Kay, Fred Patrick, Ted Eddy (né Ted Eddy Simonetti; 1902–1985)	2:36
3.	"The Lip"	Ted Klages, Vic Knight	2:15
4.	"Body and Soul (instrumental)"	Frank Eyton, Johnny Green, Edward Heyman, Robert Sour	3:22
5.	"Oh Marie"	Eduardo Di Capua, arr. Louis Prima	2:25

Side 2
No.	Title	Writing	Length
6.	"Medley: Basin Street Blues / When It's Sleepy Time Down South"	Spencer Williams / Leon Rene, Otis Rene, Clarence Muse	4:12
7.	"Jump, Jive, an' Wail"	Prima	3:28
8.	"Buona Sera"	Peter DeRose, Carl Sigman	2:58
9.	"Night Train (instrumental)"	Jimmy Forrest	2:46
10.	"(I'll Be Glad When You're Dead) You Rascal You"	Sam Theard	3:13

2002 reissue bonus tracks
No.	Title	Writing	Length
11.	"Five Months, Two Weeks, Two Days [F3566a]"	Debbie Moore, Don Donaldson	2:08
12.	"Banana Split for My Baby [F3566b]"	Prima, Stan Irwin	2:29
13.	"Whistle Stop [F3615a]"	Jimmy Breadlove	2:15
14.	"Be Mine (Little Baby) [F3615b]"	Sam Butera, Prima	2:35

== Personnel ==
- Louis Prima - vocals, trumpet
- Keely Smith - vocals
- Sam Butera - tenor saxophone
- James Blount, Jr. - trombone
- Willie McCumber - piano
- Jack Marshall - guitar
- Amato Rodrigues - bass guitar
- Bobby Morris - drums
