= Que reste-t-il de nos amours? =

Single by Lucienne Boyer
- B-side: "Colombe"
- Released: 1944
- Recorded: 1942
- Genre: Jazz, chanson
- Length: 3:17
- Label: Columbia
- Songwriters: Charles Trenet; Léo Chauliac

French publication's cover containing the musical score and lyrics edited in 1942.

"Que reste-t-il de nos amours?" (French pronunciation: [kə ʁɛstə t‿il də noz‿amuʁ], transl. What Remains of Our Loves?) is a French popular song, with music by Léo Chauliac and Charles Trenet, and lyrics by Trenet. A version of the song with English lyrics entitled "I Wish You Love" is recognizable by the opening line "I wish you bluebirds, in the spring".

== History ==
The first release of the song was by French crooner Roland Gerbeau in February 1943 (78 rpm, Polydor Records: 524.830). Charles Trenet recorded his own version in July 1943 (78 rpm Columbia Records: DF 3116). French singer Lucienne Boyer's version was released in March 1944 (78 rpm, Columbia Records: BF 68).

== English adaptation "I Wish You Love" ==
The song is best known to anglophone audiences as "I Wish You Love", with new lyrics by American composer and lyricist, Albert Askew Beach (1924–1997). "I Wish You Love" was introduced in 1957 by Keely Smith as the title cut of her solo debut album, I Wish You Love, and was one of Smith's signature songs. Smith's debut album otherwise consisted of standards. She later recalled:

[when] we sat down to select the songs, [record producer] Voyle Gilmore...played a bunch of standards and he said, "I want to play you a really pretty French song [...] it won't mean nothing and you won't do it in the album but I just thought I'd play it for you" and he played "I Wish You Love". So, at the end of him playing all these songs [...] I said: "Babe, I'll sing any 11 songs y'all want me to but I want to sing 'I Wish You Love'."

== Other recordings ==
It has since become a standard, with many other recordings:

- Gloria Lynne's 1963 recording for the Everest label reached No. 28 on the Billboard Hot 100 in 1964 and the top ten on the Easy Listening chart, and #3 on Cashbox Magazine's R&B chart (Billboard did not publish standard R&B listings during 1964).
- A Spanish version entitled "Te deseo amor" was recorded by La Rondalla de Saltillo; it reached number #1 in Mexico in 1969.
- Dalida recorded the song in 1972.
- Rony Verbiest recorded the song in 2001.
- An Italian version entitled "Che cosa resta" was recorded by Franco Battiato in 1999.
- An Arabic version entitled "Shou Byeb'a" was recorded by Carla Chamoun in 2020.

=== Other notable recordings ===
- Ronnie Aldrich
- The Artistics
- Isabelle Aubret
- Baguette Quartet
- Chet Baker
- The Bachelors
- Long John Baldry
- Gigliola Cinquetti
- Michael Ball
- Shirley Bassey
- Gianni Basso
- Joe Bataan
- Alla Bayanova (in Romanian as "Ce-a Mai Rămas?")
- Vicki Benet
- Paloma Berganza
- Maria Bethânia
- Bruno Bertone
- Ray Brown
- Michael Bublé
- Ray Bryant
- Maria Amapola Cabase
- Ana Caram (in Portuguese as "Nossos Amores")
- Joyce Carr
- Liane Carroll
- Johnny Case
- Jeanne Castle
- Ray Charles
- Rosemary Clooney
- Nat King Cole
- Natalie Cole
- Harry Connick Jr.
- Chris Connor
- Russell Conway
- Sam Cooke
- Van Craven
- Bing Crosby recorded the song in 1956 for use on his radio show and it was subsequently included in the box set The Bing Crosby CBS Radio Recordings (1954-56) issued by Mosaic Records (catalog MD7-245) in 2009.
- Bette Davis
- Joey DeFrancesco
- Tony DeSare
- Blossom Dearie
- Marlene Dietrich
- Joe Diorio
- Sacha Distel
- Bill Doggett
- Arielle Dombasle
- The Drifters
- Harry "Sweets" Edison
- Diego Figueiredo & Cyrille Aimée
- Ella Fitzgerald
- The Five Jades
- Buddy Fo
- Sergio Franchi
- Vincent Franco
- Alison Fraser
- Friends of Dean Martinez
- Laura Fygi
- Judy Garland
- John Gary
- Stan Getz and Kenny Barron
- João Gilberto
- Benny Goodman
- Eydie Gorme
- Robert Goulet
- Graciela
- Buddy Greco
- Benny Green
- Grant Green
- Françoise Hardy & Alain Bashung (duet)
- Niki Haris
- Billy Hawks
- Bill Henderson
- Ian Hendrickson-Smith
- Ron Hevener
- Earl Hines
- Engelbert Humperdinck
- Willie Hutch
- Walter Hyatt
- Chrissie Hynde
- Jermaine Jackson
- Joni James
- Jack Jones
- Patricia Kaas
- Stacey Kent
- Rebecca Kilgore
- Kathy Kirby
- Eartha Kitt (1966)
- Laufey (recorded both for her EP Typical of Me and her live album A Night at the Symphony with the Iceland Symphony Orchestra)
- Jerry Lee Lewis
- Julie London
- Dean Martin
- Nancy Martinez
- Johnny Mathis
- Chris Montez
- Mark Murphy
- Lisa Ono
- Trijntje Oosterhuis
- Rosa Passos and Henri Salvador
- Esther Phillips
- Princess in 1988
- Jonathan Richman
- Giant Sand
- George Shearing
- Frank Sinatra - It Might as Well Be Swing (1964)
- The Singers Unlimited
- The Skatalites
- Keely Smith
- Dusty Springfield (September 12, 1967, Live at the BBC)
- Rod Stewart and Chris Botti
- Barbra Streisand
- David T. Walker
- Dionne Warwick
- Kristy White
- Barney Wilen
- Andy Williams released a version on his 1960 album, Under Paris Skies.
- Cris Williamson
- Nancy Wilson
- Victor Wood
- Rachael Yamagata
- Pia Zadora
- Vero Perez
- Brazilian singer Salomé de Bahia in 2002
- VARITDA in Mood (2020)

== Use in film ==
The song was heard in several films:

- It was used extensively in the François Truffaut film Stolen Kisses (1968), its French title, Baisers volés, having been taken from the song's lyrics.
- The song was also used in the films "Eye Of The Beholder" (1999), "Iris" (2001), "Something's Gotta Give" (2003), and "Ces amours-là" (2010).
- A performance of the song is featured in the film "Une jeune fille qui va bien" (2021).
