= List of works by James G. Ellis =

James G. Ellis was an American composer. This article is a list of his notable works.

== Works ==
=== Selected popular works ===
James G. Ellis, Ogden, Utah

- "Where the Rippling Ogden Flows", words & music by Ellis (©1909)

Ellis & Armitage, Chicago

- "Motorcycle Michael With Me", words & music by Ellis (©1912; L.E. Ellis)
- "When I Carved Your Name With Mine", words by Anne Campbell, music by Ellis (©1913)

Ellis & Co., Grand Opera House Building, Chicago

- "Motorcycle Michael With Me", words & music by Ellis (©1912; L.E. Ellis); OCLC 498605744 (view)
- "When I Carved Your Name With Mine", words by Anne Campbell, music by Ellis (©1913); OCLC 498605800
- "You're All This World To Me", words by Ellis, music by Joseph W. Ryback (né Joseph William Rybak; born 1881) (©1913; Ellis & Fisher, Chicago); OCLC 499125929
- "My Great Grand Daddy Fought in 1812", words & music by E.G. James (pseudonym of James G. Ellis) (©1914; ©1942 Los Angeles)
- "The Tale the Tear Drop Told", words & music by Ellis (©1914; ©1942 Los Angeles) †
- "That Ragtime Symphony", words & music by E.G. James (pseudonym of James G. Ellis) (©1914; ©1942, Los Angeles); OCLC 499058886
- "Take Me Back to Paradise", words by Anne Campbell & Leonard A. Meyer, music by Ellis (©1914; ©1941 Los Angeles); OCLC 498605774 †
- "Just Because You've Been So Good To Me" ("That's Why I Love You"), words & music by Ellis (©1913); OCLC 498635203

Henderson & Co., New Haven, Indiana

- "Firelight Fancies", words by Kathryn Marie Henderson, music by Ellis (©1914); OCLC 9164078 (view)
- "The Bride and the Rose Bud", words by Kathryn Marie Henderson, music by Ellis (©1915); OCLC 9144235 (view)

Ellis Music, Chicago

- "I Am Dreaming Of My Irish Rose", words by Ellis, music by Jozef W. Rybak (né Joseph William Rybak; born 1881), arr. by Burrel Van Buren (©1914; ©1942 Los Angeles); OCLC 499125910 (view) †
- "In The Mellow, Mellow Moonlight", words & music by Ellis (©1915); OCLC 498605711

Tell Taylor, Chicago

- "When the Bonnie, Bonnie Heather Is Blooming: I'll Return Annie Laurie to You", words & music by Ellis (©1915); OCLC 498572474 (view)

Frank K. Root & Co., a Chicago publisher (né Frank Kimball Root; 1856–1932)

- "When the Bonnie, Bonnie Heather Is Blooming: I'll Return Annie Laurie to You", words & music by Ellis (©1915); OCLC 44790397
- "Last Night in a Dream", words & music by James G Ellis (©1917); OCLC 498605733

Craig-Ellis & Co., Roger A. Graham, manager (Note: Publishing addresses of Craig-Ellis & Co. was 145 North Clark Street, Chicago.)

- "Tears-A Reverie", A Paraphrase of James G. Ellis' Beautiful Ballad "The Tale The Tear' Drop Told", words & music by May Olivette Hill (1888–1978) (©1915)
- "The Tale the Tear Drop Told", words & music by Ellis (©1914; ©1942 Los Angeles); OCLC 60630956 †

H.S. Talbot & Co. (Hiram S. Talbot; born 1871), Chicago. Music Printers & Eng's. (Note: H.S. Talbot & Co. was founded in 1890. Its locations were: 184 Dearborn (1910); 105 S Dearborn Street (1912); 2931 Flournoy and 38 W. Randolph (1914); 36 West Randolph Street (1916)) (Note: Talbot notes: 1919: Irving Gingrich (pseudonym of Peter Philip Bilhorn; 1865–1936), a composer of over 2000 gospel hymns, was office manager of H.S. Talbot & Co.)

- "Funny Charlie Chaplin", words & music by Ellis (©1915); OCLC 726919378, 726921725

Acme Music Publishers, 12 East 35th Street, Chicago

- "Funny Charlie Chaplin", words & music by Ellis (©1915); OCLC 671370458, 726921725, 726919378

Monarch Music Publishers, Chicago

- "My Little Geisha", words by Ellis, music by Adelene Ingram (©1916; ©1944 Los Angeles); OCLC 499058040 (audio)

Phenix Music Publishers, 145 N. Clark Street, Chicago

- "We'll Put Another Star in the Star Spangled Banner", words by Arthur J. Lamb, music by Ellis (©1916); OCLC 226392223 (view)

John G. Winter

- "Waltz Me in the Good Old Fashioned Way", words by John G. Winter, music by Ellis (©1915)

Miscellaneous

- "Love's Joys and Sorrows", words by Barbara Moser, music by Ellis (©1915 Barbara Moser, Berne, Indiana)

The lyrics reflect Moser's dreams that a Chicago Police Detective, Captain Patrick D. O'Brien (1858–1935), will find her friend, Angelina E. Heller, who was lost in the SS Eastland Disaster.

- "Our Yesterdays", words by Tilla C. Cole, music by Ellis (©1915 Tilla C. Cole, Bazine, Kansas)
- Fortune, a musical play, text and music by Ellis (©1933, Los Angeles)

Morris H. Abell (1876–1931)

- "The Blue Star Turned to Silver, Then To Gold", words by Morris H. Abell, music by Ellis (©1918, ©1946 J. G. Ellis, Los Angeles); OCLC 498605700

Thomas W. Hatch, Chicago

- "An Ocean Romance", words by Winnifred O'Hara, music by Ellis (©1919)

† Billboard hit

=== Selected sacred works ===
James G. Ellis (Jas. G. Ellis)

- "The Way To Paradise", words by Arthur J. Lamb, music by Ellis (©1917)
- "Thine Is the Kingdom", poem by Joel B. Dow, music by Ellis (©1920); OCLC 499123993
- "God's Perfect Child", words & music by Ellis (©1921, Chicago); OCLC 497496219
- "Love, Thrill My Heart", words & music by Ellis (©1921); OCLC 498204944

Thomas W. Hatch, Chicago

- "Leave It With Him", music by Ellis (©1917); OCLC 78216824

Words are an excerpt from the poem, "Yes, Leave It With Him", which is part of a longer poem titled "He Careth For You", by Rev. Edmund Bridges Miner (1829–1916), first published in the late 1870s in The Interior, a bygone periodical of Western Presbyterian Pub. Co.

- "Nearer" poem by Ellis, music by Margaret Birnbach (©1917); OCLC 498234856
- "Beside a Summer Sea", words by Winnifred O'Hara, music by Ellis (©1919, ©1946 Los Angeles); OCLC 498605683
- "I Shall Not Want" ("23rd Psalm"), music by Ellis (©1919); OCLC 48126257
- "God Is Love", words by DeWitt McMurray (1866–1940), music by Ellis (©1920); OCLC 459789017
- "Childlike", words by William P. McKenzie (1866–1942), music by Ellis (©1920)
- "Rejoice, My Son, Rejoice", words from psalms, music by Ellis (1920); OCLC 498724188
- "Fear Not", words by Mrs. E. Perkins, music by Ellis (©1920); OCLC 497040875
- "I Shall Not Want" ("23rd Psalm"), music by Ellis (©1920); OCLC 497763655
- "In Quiet Resting Places", music by Ellis (©1921)

Golden Shore Pub. Co., Los Angeles

- "Transfiguration," music by Ellis (©1927; copyright assigned in 1939 to Boston Music Company) (audio)

Words for the first 1/3rd of the song is Matthew's account of Jesus' transfiguration on the mountain
Words for the remaining 2/3rds is an excerpt from Thomas Moore's Lalla Rookh

Boston Music Co. (G. Schirmer, Boston)
Henry Clough-Leighter, editor-in-chief since 1908 (1874–1956)

- "Leave It With Him", ibid (©1936; ©1945, Los Angeles); OCLC 45199122, 57586750
- "Leave It With Him", ibid, arranged by Chester Wallis (duet for high & low voice with piano or organ) (1936) (Note: Vol. 32, Nos. 1–12, For the Year 1937 (1938))

Copyright December 28, 1936; Class E (musical composition), published, 59505, Boston Music Co.

- "As a Man Thinketh in His Heart" ("So Is He"), music by Ellis (©1935); OCLC 65375021
- "I Shall Not Want" ("23rd Psalm"), music by Ellis (©1935); OCLC 424621404
- "Rejoice, My Son, Rejoice", words from psalms, music by Ellis (1935); OCLC 63762221

=== Other published works ===
- Even So To Them — The Law and the Prophets: In Twenty-Eight Chapters; Fiction That Should Be True, research by Mediratas (pseudonym of James Garfield Ellis), Wetzel Publishing Co., Los Angeles (©1943); OCLC 27353073

"Fictional restatement of the Way of Christ in its primitive purity, an interesting story couched in divine philosophy"

- Which Way, Pilgrim? research by Mediratas (pseudonym of James Garfield Ellis), Long Beach, California: Golden Rulers (publisher) (1950)
- The key to Christian Science and the Bible, research by Mediratas (pseudonym of James Garfield Ellis), annotations on writings from the first edition of Science and Health by Mary Baker Eddy (1875) and on related quotations from Bible

By Ellis, Bell, California: Golden Rulers (publisher) (1951); OCLC 82373624, 50080708

Golden Rulers, publisher, was owned by James Garfield Ellis (Note: Vol. 6, Part 1A, no. 1, January – June 1952, pg. 382)
Wetzel Publishing, Los Angeles, was a self publishing firm widely known for publishing Gadsby, a 50,000 word story written in 1939 without a single letter "e"

=== Selected discography ===
- "Leave It With Him" (sacred music), words by Rev. Edmund Bridges Miner (1829–1916), music by Ellis (©1917); OCLC 84484799

Victor 45322; Matrix B-26470/6, sung by Elsie Baker, recorded May 18, 1922, Camden, New Jersey
Library of Congress archive

- "Leave It With Him", ibid.; OCLC 45238869

Columbia Graphophone Co. 91515, Ambrose Jay Wyrick (1891–1960), tenor
Personal Record, made for MackEllis Co.
Selling Agent: Thomas W. Hatch, 208 N. Wabash Ave. Chicago

- "Leave It With Him" (sacred music), ibid.; OCLC 272566500, 83968675

Edison Diamond Disc 56488-R
Georgia Brevillier (née French; 1883–1950), contralto, with orchestra
Recorded October 13, 1921

- "Love, Thrill My Heart" (sacred music); OCLC 79650441

Crown (label)
Francois Anatole, with piano, viola, and flute

- Mary Dean Sings "Transfiguration"; OCLC 863184475

Mary Dean, vocalist; William Aubert Luce, organist
Malibu, California: Sceptre Records

- Edison 5579, Edison 50403-R, & Edison Blue Amberol Records 3287 (©1917); OCLC 58750296, 74350639, 80390534; (audio on YouTube)

Side R (cylinder): Matrix 5579-B-1-4[1-2] "When The Bonnie, Bonnie Heather is Blooming — I'll Return Annie Laurie To You", sung by Glen Ellison (1876–1947)
Recorded in New York City, March 21, 1917

=== Selected works ===
- Guide to Music Publishing (private ed.), Chicago (Note: Vol. 3, Nos. 1–26, Part 1, June 1906, pg. 211)
