= What Is This Thing Called Love? =

1929 popular song by Cole Porter

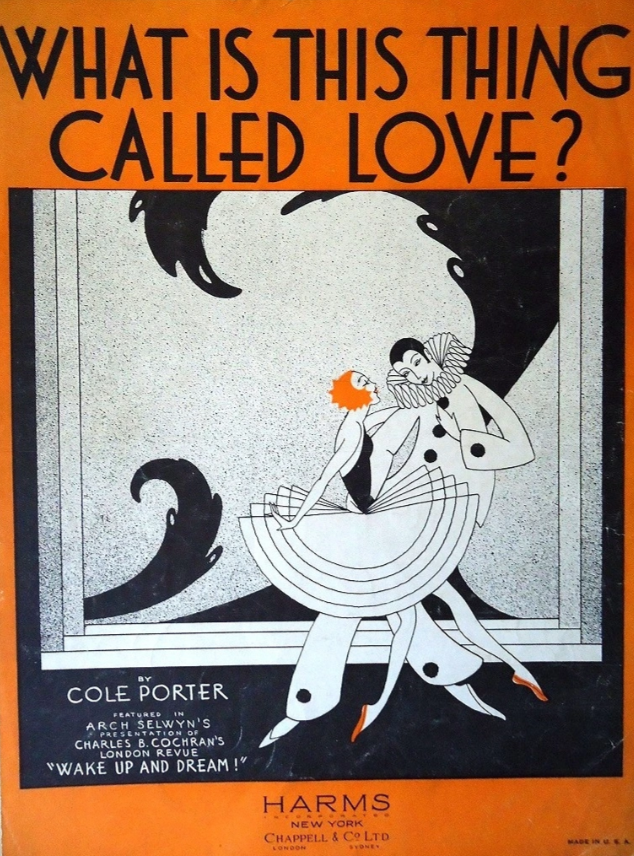
- Sheet music cover, 1929

Song
- Published: 1929 by Harms
- Songwriter: Cole Porter

"What Is This Thing Called Love?" is a 1929 popular song written by Cole Porter, for the musical Wake Up and Dream. It was originally published by Harms and first performed by Elsie Carlisle in March 1929. The song has become a popular jazz standard and one of Porter's most often played compositions.

== Background ==
Wake Up and Dream ran for 263 shows in London. The show was also noticed in New York, and the critics praised Tilly Losch's performance of the song. The show was produced on Broadway in December 1929; in the American rendition, "What Is This Thing Called Love" was sung by Frances Shelley.

== Early recordings ==
Jazz musicians soon included the song in their repertoire. The recordings of Ben Bernie and Fred Rich (vocal by The Rollickers) made it to the charts in 1930, and the song was also recorded by stride pianist James P. Johnson, clarinetist Artie Shaw and guitarist Les Paul. The piece is usually performed at a fast tempo; the 1956 recording of Clifford Brown and Max Roach with Sonny Rollins is one of the best-known uptempo instrumental versions. Saxophonist Sidney Bechet made a slow rendition in 1941 with Charlie Shavers.

== Other recordings ==
- Dave Brubeck (1950)
- Cannonball Adderley – At the Lighthouse (1960)
- Bing Crosby (1955) for use on his radio show and it was included in the box set The Bing Crosby CBS Radio Recordings (1954–56) issued by Mosaic in 2009.
- Tommy Dorsey – Sy Oliver's arrangement with vocalist Connie Haines and trumpeter Ziggy Elman
- Ella Fitzgerald (1956)
- Vince Guaraldi Trio – The Navy Swings (1965)
- Billie Holiday with Bob Haggart and His Orchestra (Joe Guy on trumpet, Bill Stegmeyer on alto saxophone, Armand Camgros and Hank Ross on tenor saxophones, Stan Webb on baritone saxophone, Sammy Benskin on piano, Tiny Grimes on guitar, Bob Haggart on bass and conductor, Specs Powell on drums, and a strings sextet) in New York City on August 14, 1945 for Decca
- Libby Holman – (Brunswick, 1930) (rare rendition of the composition with the introductory verse)
- Bobby McFerrin and Herbie Hancock – The Other Side of 'Round Midnight (1986)
- Les Paul – This reached No. 11 in the Billboard chart in 1948.
- Leo Reisman – 1930
- Artie Shaw(1938)
- Frank Sinatra – In the Wee Small Hours (1955)
- Keely Smith – Swingin' Pretty (1959)
- Jacky Terrasson and Stefon Harris – Kindred (2001)
- Hampton Hawes with Red Mitchell & Chuck Thompson (1955)
- Melody Gardot – Sunset in the Blue (2020)
- Barbra Streisand – Barbra Streisand in Concert (1994)
- Dave Grusin – Piano, Strings And Moonlight (1962)

== Influence ==
- The chord progression of the song forms the basis of several jazz compositions (contrafact), such as "Hot House" by Tadd Dameron and Subconscious Lee by Lee Konitz.

== See also ==
- List of 1920s jazz standards
