= Swingin' Pretty =

Studio album by Keely Smith
- Released: May 28, 1959
- Genre: Jazz
- Label: Capitol
- Producer: Voyle Gilmore

Keely Smith chronology
Politely! (1958)	Swingin' Pretty (1959)	Be My Love (1959)

Swingin' Pretty is a 1959 studio album by the American jazz singer Keely Smith, arranged by Nelson Riddle.

A review of the 2000 reissue of Swingin' Pretty by Heather Phares on Allmusic.com said that the album captured Smith "at the height of her powers".

== Track listing ==
1. "It's Magic" (Sammy Cahn, Jule Styne)
2. "It's Been a Long, Long Time" (Cahn, Styne)
3. "Stormy Weather" (Harold Arlen, Ted Koehler)
4. "Indian Love Call" (Rudolf Friml, Otto Harbach, Oscar Hammerstein II)
5. "The Nearness of You" (Hoagy Carmichael, Ned Washington)
6. "What Is This Thing Called Love?" (Cole Porter)
7. "The Man I Love" (George Gershwin, Ira Gershwin)
8. "You're Driving Me Crazy" (Walter Donaldson)
9. "Stardust" (Carmichael, Mitchell Parish)
10. "There Will Never Be Another You" (Mack Gordon, Harry Warren)
11. "Someone to Watch over Me" (G. Gershwin, I. Gershwin)
12. "(What Can I Say) After I Say I'm Sorry?" (Donaldson, Abe Lyman)
