= Mr. Wonderful (1955 song) =

Popular song

"Mr. Wonderful" is a popular song, written in 1955 written by Jerry Bock, George David Weiss, and Larry Holofcener, as the title song of a Broadway musical starring Sammy Davis Jr. The song was introduced in the musical by Olga James.

The most popular contemporary recordings of the song were done by Peggy Lee, Sarah Vaughan and Teddi King. All of these reached the Billboard charts in 1956.

== Other recordings ==
- Keely Smith - I Wish You Love (1957)
- Ann-Margret also recorded the song for her 1963 album Bachelors' Paradise
