= Just a Gigolo (song) =

1929 Austrian song

"Schöner Gigolo, armer Gigolo"

Song
- Language: German
- Published: 1929 by Wiener Bohème-Verlag
- Genre: Tango
- Composer: Leonello Casucci (in 1928)
- Lyricists: Julius Brammer (1924 in German); Irving Caesar (1929 in English)

"Just a Gigolo" is a popular song, adapted by Irving Caesar into English in 1929 from the Austrian tango "Schöner Gigolo, armer Gigolo", composed in 1928 in Vienna by Leonello Casucci with lyrics written in 1924 by Julius Brammer. The song describes a man who makes a living by offering to dance with various women who only value him for his good looks, leaving him alone and pondering what people will think of him when he grows old.

== History ==
The song was first published by Wiener Boheme Verlag in 1929 and performed by several orchestras in Germany that year, including Dajos Béla's orchestra with the singer Kurt Mühlhardt. Daniele Serra sang a version entitled "Gigolo" in Italy, followed by Sirio Di Piramo and his orchestra in 1930, while other countries provided their own versions.

The original version is a poetic vision of the social collapse experienced in Austria after World War I, represented by the figure of a former hussar who remembers how he once paraded in his grand uniform while he is forced to support himself as a lonely, nameless hired dancer. The music features a simple melodic sequence, but nonetheless has a clever harmonic construction that highlights the mixed emotions in the lyrics, adding a nostalgic, bittersweet effect.

The success of the song prompted publishers Chappell & Co. to buy the rights and order an English version from Irving Caesar, a very popular lyricist of the time. Caesar eliminated the specific Austrian references and, in the often-omitted verse (but included in the 1931 recording by Bing Crosby), set the action in a Paris cafe, where a local character tells his sad story. Thus, the lyrics retained their sentimental side but lost their historic context. Popular versions in 1931 were by Ted Lewis, Ben Bernie, Bing Crosby and Leo Reisman.

"Just a Gigolo" appeared in a 1931 film, a 1932 Betty Boop cartoon and a 1993 TV series, all titled after the song. The song was recorded by many musicians of the time, including Louis Armstrong and (in German) Richard Tauber.

The film Schöner Gigolo, armer Gigolo, directed by David Hemmings in 1979, was titled after the first verse of the original lyrics, but the Just a Gigolo title was used for US distribution. In this film, the song was performed by Marlene Dietrich, in her last film appearance.

== "Just a Gigolo"/"I Ain't Got Nobody" medley ==
=== Origin ===
"Just a Gigolo" is best known in a form recorded by Louis Prima in 1956, where it was paired in a medley with another old standard, "I Ain't Got Nobody" (words by Roger A. Graham and music by Spencer Williams, 1915). This pairing links the life of a gigolo ("people know the part I'm playing, paid for every dance..."), to the outcome of the singer ending up alone ("I ain't got nobody"). The popularity of Prima's combination, and of the Village People's 1978 and David Lee Roth's 1985 cover versions of the medley, has led to the mistaken perception by some that the songs are two parts of a single original composition.

The coupling of the two songs had its genesis in an earlier Louis Prima recording from 1945 (V Disc 554, side A), which was then adapted by Sam Butera for Prima's 1950s Las Vegas stage show, during which Prima would revisit his old hits in a new, jive-and-jumping style. The success of that act gained Prima a recording deal with Capitol Records, which aimed to capture on record the atmosphere of his shows. The first album, titled The Wildest! and released in November 1956, opened with "Just a Gigolo"/"I Ain't Got Nobody", which then became Prima's signature number and helped relaunch his career.

=== Louis Prima's recording ===
"Just a Gigolo/I Ain't Got Nobody"

Song by Louis Prima

from the album The Wildest!
- Released: 25 June 1956
- Recorded: 23 April 1956
- Genre: Swing
- Length: 4:42
- Label: Capitol
- Songwriters: Leonello Casucci, Irving Caesar, Spencer Williams, Roger Graham
- Producer: Voyle Gilmore

The recording session took place on 23 April 1956, at Capitol Studios in Los Angeles, and was produced by Voyle Gilmore. Prima was backed by his Las Vegas group, Sam Butera & the Witnesses, in its original line-up: Sam Butera (tenor sax), James "Red" Blount (trombone), William "Willie" McCumber (piano), Jack Marshall (guitar), Amado Rodriques (bass) and Robert "Bobby" Morris (drums). Keely Smith, who was Prima's wife and an important part of his act, joined the Witnesses for the characteristic backing vocals. Prima sang the lead but didn't play the trumpet on this track.

==== Charts ====
Weekly chart performance
Chart (2026)	Peak position
Russia Streaming (TopHit)	99

"Just a Gigolo/I Ain't Got Nobody"

Single by David Lee Roth

from the EP Crazy from the Heat
- Released: March 1985
- Recorded: 1985
- Genre: Rock
- Length: 4:17
- Label: Warner Bros.
- Songwriters: Leonello Casucci, Irving Caesar, Spencer Williams, Roger Graham
- Producer: Ted Templeman

David Lee Roth singles chronology
"California Girls" (1985)	"Just a Gigolo/I Ain't Got Nobody" (1985)	"Yankee Rose" (1986)

Music video
- "Just a Gigolo/I Ain't Got Nobody on YouTube

== List of versions ==
The following artists have released or performed versions of the song:

- Leo Reisman and His Orchestra First recording on 5 January (Victor 22606) (1931)
- Bing Crosby with The Gus Arnheim Orchestra (recorded 2 March 1931) – includes Paris verse.
- Louis Armstrong Recorded 9 March (1931)
- Ben Bernie and His Orchestra (Brunswick 6023) (1931)
- Damia (1931) as "C'est mon Gigolo" (French version adapted from L. Casucci by A. Mauprey, J. Lenoir)
- Ted Lewis and His Band (Columbia 2378 D) (1931)
- Art Tatum
- Django Reinhardt and Stéphane Grappelli in Rome (1949)
- Harry James (1952)
- Jaye P. Morgan (1953) – a minor hit, reaching No. 22 in the Billboard charts.
- Thelonious Monk (1954, 1958, 1962)
- Louis Prima (1956)
- Sarah Vaughan – included in the album At Mister Kelly's (1957)
- Eino Virtanen, a Finnish version called "Kaunis Gigolo" (1958)
- Carmen McRae – included in her album Song Time (1960).
- Gus Backus
- Jean Shepherd (1965) opened the 29 July 1965, episode of his show with the song
- Erroll Garner (1965)
- Connie Francis – for the album Connie & Clyde – Hit Songs of the 30s (1968)
- Oscar Peterson (1970)
- Peter Allen (1974)
- Chris DeMarco as Michel Delon (1976)
- Prima's version was covered by Alex Harvey in 1979 on his The Mafia Stole My Guitar album.
- Village People (1978) recorded a cover of Prima's version.
- Marlene Dietrich title song of film Just a Gigolo (1978), included in the 1979 soundtrack. It was the last record by Dietrich.
- Barbie and the Kens (1980)
- Javier Gurruchaga's Orquesta Mondragón during the film Besame Tonta (1982)
- David Lee Roth (1985) (reached No. 12 on the Billboard Hot 100), based on Prima's version, from the EP Crazy from the Heat. The music video for his recording parodies a number of well-known pop-music performers Michael Jackson, Cyndi Lauper, Mötley Crüe, Billy Idol, Willie Nelson, Culture Club, cameos appearances and cultural trends of the first half of the 1980s.
- Bob (Rivers) & Zip (1985), with alternate lyrics "Just a Big Ego"
- Tony Martin (1985)
- Swedish dansband Ingmar Nordströms recorded a Swedish-language version of the song, called "Gösta Gigolo", on the 1985 album Saxparty 12. The title is pronounced the same as in English, but refers to a man named Gösta and is hanging around the dance floor in the hotel of a small town. The Swedish lyrics were written by Östen Warnebring.
- Tiny Tim (1987) on the record "Tiptoe Through the Tulips"
- Tapani Kansa, a Finnish version called "Vastustamaton" on his album Anna mulle aikaa (1990)
- Marty Grosz (1992, 2005)
- Leningrad Cowboys (1993)
- Tony Slattery (1993) as the closing song for the TV show "Just a Gigolo" in which he also stars.
- Amanda Lear utilizes the song in her live repertoire and a 1998 recording can be found on the compilation Made of Blood and Honey (reportedly a #1 hit in Hungary, Romania, Latvia, Liechtenstein, Andorra).
- Dick Hyman Group and Howard Alden (1999) in Woody Allen's Sweet and Lowdown
- Lou Bega (2001)
- In 2003 Israeli singer and TV star, Gidi Gov, released a Hebrew version of Prima's medley, called "Gigolo" on his album Moondance (Hebrew: ריקוד ירח).
- Sergio Pángaro & Baccarat (Spanish version, 2003)
- Tyler Lewis (2006)
- In 2007 Paolo Belli released "Io Sono Un Gigolò", an Italian version of the song.
- Paul Motian recorded the song on his 2009 album On Broadway Volume 5.
- Lucio Dalla and Francesco De Gregori, with new Italian text, on their 2010 live album Work in Progress.
- Mina (Italian singer) recorded and released the song on her 2012 album 12 (American Song Book).
- The Jive Aces on the 2012 album King of the Swingers: A Salute to Louis Prima.
- Frank D'Angelo recorded and released the song on his 2015 album I Want to Live Forever: Official Soundtrack from the Feature Film Sicilian Vampire.
- Gregory Golub – Israeli composer and jazz pianist recorded and released a single "Just a Gigolo" (Remembering Louis Prima) (2020)
- Michael Ball and Alfie Boe recorded a version for their album Together in vegas 2022.
- The University of Illinois Marching Illini are also well known for performing the song as part of their post-game show.
