= Someone to Watch Over Me (song) =

1926 song by George and Ira Gershwin, Howard Dietz

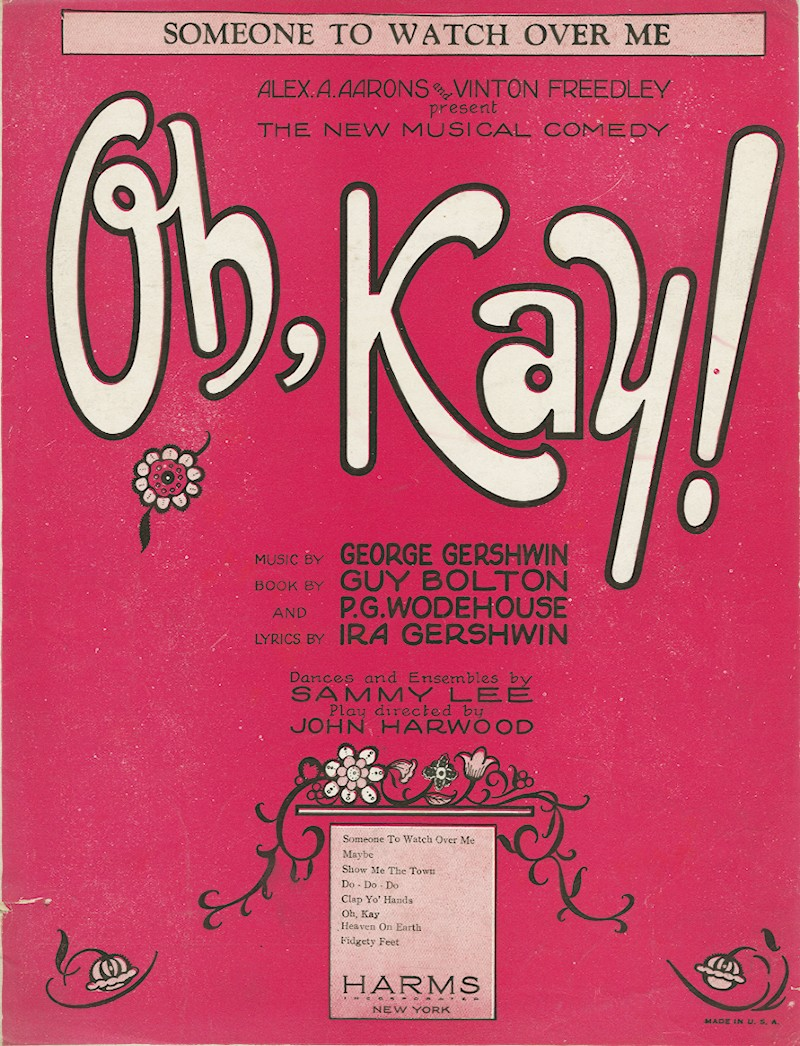
- 1926 "Someone to Watch Over Me" sheet music

Single by Gertrude Lawrence
- B-side: "Do, Do, Do"
- Published: November 3, 1926 Harms, Inc. Warner Bros, Inc.
- Released: February 1927
- Recorded: October 29, 1926
- Studio: Trinity Church Studio, Camden, New Jersey
- Venue: Oh Kay! Broadway musical
- Genre: Popular Music, vocal jazz
- Length: 3.25
- Label: Victor 20331
- Composer: George Gershwin
- Lyricists: Ira Gershwin, Howard Dietz

"Someone to Watch Over Me" is a 1926 song composed by George Gershwin with lyrics by Ira Gershwin, assisted by Howard Dietz who wrote the title. It was written for the musical Oh, Kay! (1926), with the part originally sung on Broadway by English actress Gertrude Lawrence while holding a rag doll in a sentimental solo scene. The musical ran for more than 200 performances in New York and then saw equivalent acclaim in London in 1927, all with the song as its centerpiece. Lawrence released the song as a medium-tempo single which rose to number 2 on the charts in 1927. In June 2026, CBS News included the song in its list of the 250 essential American songs of the past 250 years.

== Origin ==
Initially, "Someone to Watch Over Me" was written by George Gershwin for the musical Oh, Kay! as a "fast and jazzy" up-tempo rhythm tune – marked scherzando (playful) in the sheet music – but in the 1930s and 1940s it was recorded by singers in a slower ballad form, which became the standard. The definitive slow torch song version was first released by Lee Wiley in 1939, followed by Margaret Whiting in 1944.

Howard Dietz, who was involved in composing other songs in Oh Kay! while Ira Gershwin was hospitalized for six weeks for a ruptured appendix, claimed that he helped write the lyrics to "Someone to Watch Over Me". He was not named in the song credits, and he was paid very little for his contribution. Dietz said in his 1974 memoir that the song's title was his idea, a fact first revealed by Ira in his 1959 book Lyrics on Several Occasions.

Lawrence's performances of the song in 1926 and 1927 were presented in a solo scene at the beginning of Act II, with Lawrence wearing a maid's uniform and singing to a rag doll that she held in her hand. The rag doll was described in male gender terms by George Gershwin in 1934, saying: "I don't know where he is now... He certainly did his part well." Gershwin said he found the doll in a toy shop in Philadelphia, where the play was in development, and he gave it to Lawrence to use as a prop in the scene, to increase the sense of her character's vulnerability. This late addition surprised the play's director.

== Recordings and features ==
The song was recorded by Frank Sinatra in 1946 for his debut album The Voice of Frank Sinatra, in 1954 for the film Young At Heart, and again during the Nice 'n' Easy sessions in 1960. Sinatra's popular recordings helped cement the standard slow style. "Someone to Watch Over Me" was notably covered by Ella Fitzgerald (1950 and 1959), Chet Baker (1955), Sarah Vaughan (1957), Dakota Staton (1960), Barbra Streisand (1965), Julie Andrews (1968), Ray Charles (1969), Willie Nelson (1978), Sinéad O'Connor (1992), Rickie Lee Jones (2000), Elton John (2002) and Amy Winehouse (2008). Nelson Riddle arranged two lush orchestral versions, one backing Keely Smith in 1959 on Swingin' Pretty, and the other for Linda Ronstadt in 1983 on What's New – the latter album winning a Grammy Award. The song was also used prominently in the film Mr. Holland's Opus (1995), with vocals by Jean Louisa Kelly in the film and Julia Fordham on the film's soundtrack.

More than 1,800 recordings of the song have been released, almost all of them in the slow ballad style.

== See also ==
- List of 1920s jazz standards
- The play Someone Who'll Watch Over Me by poet Frank McGuinness.
