= You Go to My Head =

1938 standard by J. Fred Coots and Haven Gillespie

Song
- Published: 1938 by Remick Music
- Composer: J. Fred Coots
- Lyricist: Haven Gillespie

"You Go to My Head" is a 1938 popular song composed by J. Fred Coots with lyrics by Haven Gillespie. Many versions of the song have been recorded, and it has since become a pop and jazz standard.

== Melody and lyrics ==
Alec Wilder terms Coots' melody a "minor masterpiece". According to Ted Gioia,

"You Go to my Head" is an intricately constructed affair with plenty of harmonic movement. The song starts in a major key, but from the second bar onward, Mr. Coots seems intent on creating a feverish dream quality tending more to the minor mode. The release builds on the drama, and the final restatement holds some surprises as well. The piece would be noteworthy even if it lacked such an exquisite coda, but those last eight bars convey a sense of resigned closure to the song that fittingly matches the resolution of the lyrics.

Gillespie's lyrics begin: "You go to my head and you linger like a haunting refrain", matching Coot's melody throughout "with smoothly expanding phrases … [that] artfully weaves an elaborate skein of imagery."

== Recordings, use in film, and performances ==
Bryan Ferry's 1975 UK-charting cover of the song on Island Records

Larry Clinton recorded the song with his orchestra and with vocals by Bea Wain on February 24, 1938, and the song became a hit, eventually reaching #3 on the pop charts. It inspired an answer song, "You Went To My Head" (by Joseph Meyer, Bob Emmerich, and Buddy Bernier) that was recorded by Fats Waller on March 11, 1938, and again by Duke Ellington (featuring a vocal by Ivie Anderson) on April 17, 1938. The song was later recorded in 1938 by Teddy Wilson with a vocal by Nan Wynn, by Billie Holiday, and by Glen Gray's Casa Loma Orchestra. The Wilson, Holiday, and Gray versions all placed in the top 20 of the music charts in 1938. The song is played in Laura (1944 film) and The Big Sleep (1946 film). The Louis Armstrong and Oscar Peterson version of the song is played in the movie Corrina, Corrina (film).

In 1953, Frank Sinatra sang the song before a live television audience of 60 million persons (broadcast live over the NBC and CBS networks) as part of The Ford 50th Anniversary Show. He subsequently recorded it for his 1960 album Nice 'n' Easy.

On 23 April 1961, Judy Garland performed the song at the Judy at Carnegie Hall concert. Bryan Ferry recorded the song as a single with a video in 1975 reaching No. 33 in the UK charts.

== Other versions ==
- Dave Brubeck and Paul Desmond – Jazz at Storyville (1952)
- Betty Carter – It's Not About the Melody (1992)
- Billie Holiday – 1938
- Marlene Dietrich with Victor Young and His Orchestra - 1939
- Coleman Hawkins with Milt Jackson – 1946
- Doris Day – on her album You're My Thrill (1949)
- Ella Fitzgerald - Hello, Love (1959)
- Keely Smith - I Wish You Love (1957)
- Cassandra Wilson – Coming Forth by Day (2015)
- Joe Pass and Ella Fitzgerald
- Bob Dylan – Triplicate (2017)
- Count Basie/Sarah Vaughan (1961)

== See also ==
- List of 1930s jazz standards
- Picardy Third
