= Barbie and the Kens =

Barbie and the Kens were a 1980s new wave music project of Bobby Orlando, with one minor college radio hit, "Just a Gigolo", which peaked on the Billboard Club Play charts at No. 45 in 1981. Other hits include "Pay My Bills". Because of a lawsuit threat from Mattel (they threatened to sue because of their name "Barbie and the Kens" when they didn't have permission to legally have the name), they changed the band name into "Malibu", in which they continued to churn out new songs such as "Goin' Cruisin' ". The song appears on 1980s compilations and is still in rotation on retro internet stations such as Club 80s with DJ Bueller.
