= The Intimate Keely Smith =

Studio album by Keely Smith
- Released: 1964
- Recorded: 1964
- Genre: Traditional pop, jazz
- Length: 40:35
- Label: Reprise RS-6132
- Producer: Jimmy Bowen

Keely Smith chronology
Little Girl Blue/Little Girl New (1963)	The Intimate Keely Smith (1964)	Keely Smith Sings the John Lennon—Paul McCartney Songbook (1965)

The Intimate Keely Smith is a 1964 album by Keely Smith.

== Reception ==
The initial Billboard magazine review from January 30, 1965 awarded the album their 'Pop Spotlight' pick for that week and commented that "Keely is warm all over...Backed by a combo, she keeps the mood intimate and thoroughly mellow from start to finish".

In a 2016 review of a reissue of the album, Marc Myers wrote for All About Jazz that "the quality of the work is, frankly, astonishing. Smith's song choices are off-beat and perfectly tailored for her voice, and her delivery is confessional and pure saloon. What's more, we hear Smith's voice completely exposed, with little to mask her intonation or articulation. Both are heart-melting". Myers praised Smith's accompanists writing that "The group frames her sensitivity, and Smith's voice is so breathy and cozy, she seems snuggled on someone's shoulder while singing" and concluded that "This is a flawless album and a perfect way to get to know a Las Vegas singer who should have been as widely known as any of the great jazz vocalists".

== Track listing ==
1. "Somebody Loves Me" (George Gershwin, Ballard MacDonald, Buddy DeSylva) – 4:07
2. "As Long as He Needs Me" (Lionel Bart) – 2:26
3. "Blame It on My Youth" (Oscar Levant, Edward Heyman) – 2:55
4. "He Needs Me" (Arthur Hamilton) – 2:40
5. "Sinner or Saint" (Irving Gordon) – 3:41
6. "It Had to Be You" (Isham Jones, Gus Kahn) – 3:25
7. "Time After Time" (Sammy Cahn, Jule Styne) – 3:52
8. "Nancy (with the Laughing Face)"/"You Are My Sunshine" (Phil Silvers, Jimmy Van Heusen)/(Jimmie Davis, Charles Mitchell) – 3:55
9. "God Bless the Child" (Billie Holiday, Arthur Herzog, Jr.) – 2:48
10. "You'll Never Know" (Harry Warren, Mack Gordon) – 2:11
11. "The Whippoorwill" (Mitchum, Raye) – 2:55

== Personnel ==
- Keely Smith – vocals
- Jeff Lewis, Ernie Freeman – piano
- Dennis Budimir – guitar
- Red Mitchell – double bass
- Irving Cottler – drums
