= Breaking It Up! =

Studio album by Louis Prima
- Released: 1958
- Recorded: October 18, 1951; March 18, 1952; July 7, 1952; February 18, 1953; New York City
- Genre: Big band, swing
- Length: 36:23
- Label: Columbia
- Producer: Mitch Miller

Louis Prima chronology
Breaking It Up! (1958)	The Wildest! (1956)

Professional ratings
Review scores
Source	Rating
AllMusic	3/5 stars

Breaking It Up! is an album by Louis Prima, first released in 1958. It features an accompaniment by Keely Smith.

== Background ==
The end of the big-band era saw Louis Prima switch record labels several times. He eventually formed his own label, Robin Hood Records, to release his own material. His hit Oh Babe! on his own label rekindled interest in him from major labels, and he signed in 1951 to Columbia Records. Placed under the auspices of Mitch Miller, the head of artists and repertoire at Columbia, Prima's loose style clashed with Miller's production-conscious manner. The resulting recordings were Prima's combination of Italian shuffle, R&B, and comic novelties, and Miller's staid arrangements. A few of the tracks featured Keely Smith on vocals. Prima left Columbia over a dispute over who would record "Come On-a My House", and returned to recording for his own Robin Hood Records until such time as Capitol revived his recording popularity.

== Critical response ==
Cub Koda's AllMusic review calls this release as inferior to much of Prima's other material, but indicates the material is "interesting" with merely "one dud". Ed Kaz of the Asbury Park Press opined that the package "swings from end to end" and specifically notes Smith's frenetic vocals, which contrasts with her sedate image cultivated later. Kaz also highlights the cover art, considering the art alone to be worthy.

== Releases ==
During his tenure at Columbia Prima released 7 singles, or 14 sides, issued soon after recording. Columbia packaged eleven of these together in LP format (CL 1206), along with the previously unissued recording "Chop Suey, Chow Mein", in 1958 after Prima's Capitol albums became big sellers. The album was first released in digital compact disc format in 1998, with an additional track added.

== LP track listing ==
=== Side 1 ===
1. "Barnacle Bill the Sailor" (Luther, Robinson, Robison) - 2:25
2. "Luigi" (Antonio, Araco, DiLeo) - 2:44
3. "Chop Suey, Chow Mein" (White) - 2:39
4. "Paul Revere" (Darnell, Shanon, Stillman) - 2:32
5. "Eleanor" (Gigi Gryce, Paone) - 2:04
6. "The Bigger the Figure" (Barer, Wilder) - 2:40

=== Side 2 ===
1. "Shepherd Boy" (Bagdasarian, Carlyle) - 2:33
2. "One Mint Julep" (Rudy Toombs) - 2:45
3. "Basta" (Barer, Gomez, Wilder) - 2:28
4. "Chili Sauce" (Kinberg) - 1:54
5. "It's Good as New (I Painted It Blue)" (Bernier, Charlap) - 2:14
6. "Oh, Marie" (DeCapua, DiCapua, Louis Prima) - 2:19

== CD track listing ==
1. "Eleanor" (Gigi Gryce, Paone) - 2:04
2. "Shake Hands with Santa Claus" (DeLugg, Hilliard) - 2:27
3. "Oooh-Dahdily-Dah" (Louis Prima, Keely Smith) - 2:21
4. "Basta" (Barer, Gomez, Wilder) - 2:28
5. "The Bigger the Figure" (Barer, Wilder) - 2:40
6. "Boney Bones" (DeMare, Eddy, Louis Prima) - 2:44
7. "One Mint Julep" (Rudy Toombs) - 2:45
8. "Chili Sauce" (Kinberg) - 1:54
9. "Oh, Marie" (DeCapua, DiCapua, Louis Prima) - 2:19
10. "Luigi" (Antonio, Araco, DiLeo) - 2:44
11. "Paul Revere" (Darnell, Shanon, Stillman) - 2:32
12. "It's Good as New (I Painted It Blue)" (Bernier, Charlap) - 2:14
13. "Barnacle Bill the Sailor" (Luther, Robinson, Robison) - 2:25
14. "Shepherd Boy" (Bagdasarian, Carlyle) - 2:33
15. "Chop Suey, Chow Mein" (White) - 2:39

=== CD reissue personnel ===
- Billy Vera - Liner Notes, Reissue Producer
- Lawrence Cohn - Reissue Producer
- David Mitson - Mastering, Restoration, Archival Restoration
- Tim Morse - Design
- Patti Matheny - A&R
- Tom Burleigh - Product Manager
- Darren Salmieri - A&R
- Will Friedwald - Photography, Sessionography
