= Keely Smith Sings the John Lennon—Paul McCartney Songbook =

Studio album by Keely Smith
- Released: 1964
- Recorded: 1964
- Genre: Pop music
- Label: Reprise R-6142
- Producer: Jimmy Bowen

Keely Smith chronology
The Intimate Keely Smith (1964)	Keely Smith Sings the John Lennon—Paul McCartney Songbook (1964)	That Old Black Magic (1965)

Keely Smith Sings the John Lennon—Paul McCartney Songbook is an album by the American singer Keely Smith of music written by the songwriting partnership of John Lennon and Paul McCartney. The album was successful in the United Kingdom.

== Reception ==
The initial Billboard magazine review from November 14, 1964 commented that Smith's "distinct handling of the especially arranged tunes makes her come through with flying colors...Lennon and McCartney will love her for this".

In 1966, Lennon claimed that Smith "added nothing" to his and McCartney's "compositions but a couple of trumpets".

== Track listing ==
All tracks written by John Lennon and Paul McCartney.

1. "If I Fell" – 3:05
2. "This Girl" – 2:25
3. "Please Please Me" – 2:48
4. "And I Love Him" – 2:51
5. "A World Without Love" – 3:17
6. "She Loves You" – 3:14
7. "A Hard Day's Night" – 3:09
8. "Do You Want to Know a Secret?" – 2:46
9. "Can't Buy Me Love" – 2:17
10. "All My Loving" – 3:05
11. "I Want to Hold Your Hand" – 3:03
12. "P.S. I Love You" – 2:41

== Personnel ==
- Keely Smith – vocals
- Benny Carter – arranger
- Ernie Freeman – arranger and conductor
- Jimmy Bowen – production
- Ed Thrasher – art direction
