= Little Girl Blue/Little Girl New =

Studio album by Keely Smith
- Released: 1963
- Recorded: 1963
- Genre: Traditional pop, jazz
- Length: 40:35
- Label: Reprise R 6086

Keely Smith chronology
Cherokeely Swings (1962)	Little Girl Blue/Little Girl New (1963)	The Intimate Keely Smith (1963)

Professional ratings
Review scores
Source	Rating
New Record Mirror	3/5 stars

Little Girl Blue/Little Girl New is a 1963 album by Keely Smith, with arrangements by Nelson Riddle. The album was Smith's first for Reprise Records, which was founded by Smith's friend and mentor, Frank Sinatra.

== Reception ==
The initial Billboard magazine review from June 29, 1963 awarded the album their 'Pop Special Merit Pick' for that week and commented that "She generates lots of excitement whether it's an up-tempo ditty like "A Lot of Livin' to Do" or a more relaxed "Gone with the Wind"...Nelson Riddle contributes highly effective support".

The album was reviewed by Matt Collar for Allmusic who wrote that "tour de force of an album that presented Smith as the solo star she deserved to be" and described Smith as "an urbanely sophisticated hipster and a clarion diva in the mold of such similarly inclined contemporaries as June Christy, Anita O'Day, and Kay Starr". Collar praised her "...yearning take on "Here's That Rainy Day" and her languorously sensual reading of "I'll Never Be the Same Again"" and concluded that "Ultimately, listening to Smith and her pointed yet dusky, golden-toned voice pouring out of Riddle's shimmering, sky-blue arrangements, one can easily see why Sinatra jumped at the chance to work with her".

== Track listing ==
1. "Little Girl Blue" (Lorenz Hart, Richard Rodgers) – 3:56
2. "Here's That Rainy Day" (Johnny Burke, Jimmy Van Heusen) – 3:20
3. "Gone with the Wind" (Herbert Magidson, Allie Wrubel) – 3:13
4. "Willow Weep for Me" (Ann Ronell) – 3:51
5. "I'll Never Be the Same" (Gus Kahn, Matty Malneck) – 3:09
6. "Guess I'll Hang My Tears Out to Dry" (Sammy Cahn, Jule Styne) – 2:57
7. "I'm Gonna Live Till I Die" (Al Hoffman, Walter Kent) – 2:16
8. "It's Good to Be Alive" (Bob Merrill) – 2:38
9. "A Lot of Livin' to Do" (Lee Adams, Charles Strouse) – 2:15
10. "Once in a Lifetime" (Leslie Bricusse, Anthony Newley) – 2:44
11. "New Sun in the Sky" (Howard Dietz, Arthur Schwartz) – 1:43
12. "Blue Skies" (Irving Berlin) – 2:27
13. "Going Through the Motions" (Bob Brass, Al Kooper, Al Levine, Irwin Levine) – 3:00
14. "When You Cry" (Ray Allen, Wandra Merrell) – 3:06

== Personnel ==
- Keely Smith – vocals
- Nelson Riddle – arranger, conductor
