= Lloyd Garrett =

American songwriter (1886–1966)

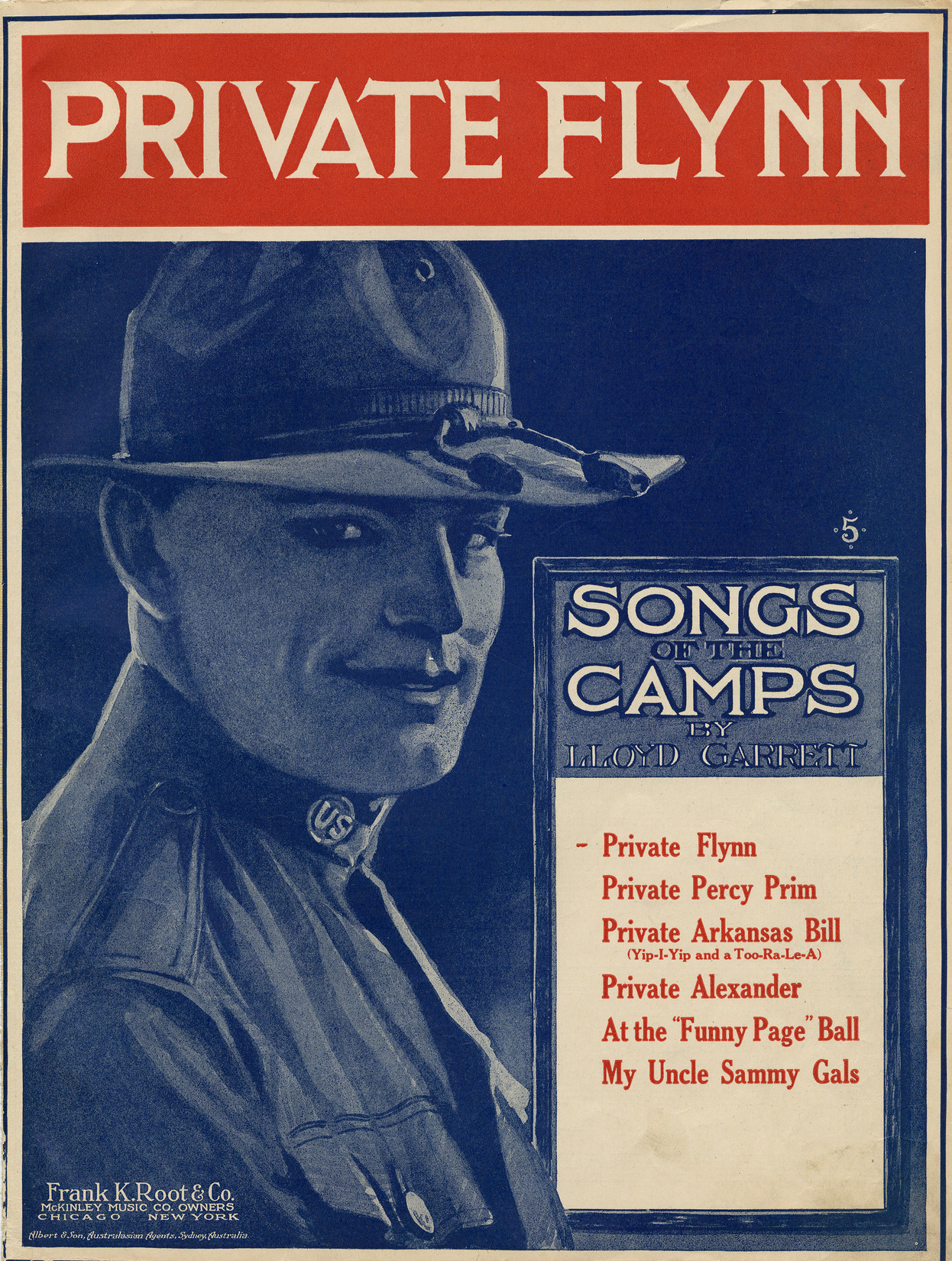
- Cover to "Private Flynn," by Lloyd Garrett (1918)
- Born: July 2, 1886
- Died: April 15, 1966 (aged 79)
- Occupations: Entertainer and songwriter

Lloyd Fry Garrett (July 2, 1886 – April 15, 1966) was an American singer, a tenor in vaudeville and musical comedy, as well as a composer and lyricist.

== Biography ==
Lloyd Garrett was born in Moulton, Iowa, into a well-educated, middle-class family; his father was a lawyer, and Lloyd was encouraged to follow his profession. However, after three years at Drake University he joined his brother Hoyt W. Garrett, a pianist, in pursuing a career in entertainment. He was initially a saxophonist, first with the Colonial Saxophone Quartette and after 1907 in a duo with his brother; but he quickly became better known as a singer, leading The Melody Makers, a quartet managed by the Redpath agency, often on the Chautauqua circuit. He was a high tenor and evidently possessed a fine falsetto; in 1915–16 he was featured as a "boy soprano" with Ralph Dunbar’s Bell-Ringers.

By 1918 he had established himself as a solo singer in revues. He was especially active in Chicago until 1920, and it was probably there that he met Gertrude Lehman, an actress, who became his first wife on December 12, 1922. In 1920 he was featured in the second edition of George White's Scandals, singing songs by George Gershwin, among others, and he reappeared in the later shows at least until 1926. At the same time he maintained a career in vaudeville and musical comedy, appearing in London in 1923 and in a Marx Brothers show in 1925.

In 1925 he opened in a production of The Student Prince that toured intermittently for several years; his co-star was Ruth Williams, and sometime in the next two years Garrett must have divorced his first wife, since he married Williams on September 20, 1927, in a widely reported ceremony, with both garbed in their Student Prince costumes. The couple settled in Stamford, Connecticut, and Garrett thereafter limited himself to brief tours and club appearances in New York. His last vaudeville tour was in 1935, with only scattered radio appearances thereafter. He eventually took a sales position with the Stamford firm of Pitney Bowes, and the Garretts became prominent in the social life of Stamford. In retirement he moved to Del Mar, California, where he died.

== Compositions ==
Garrett’s career as a lyricist and composer was mostly confined to the years 1917–23, and it was concentrated in Chicago, where nearly all of his music was published. (He used variations of his name somewhat indiscriminately: Lloyd F. Garrett, Lloyd Garrett, and occasionally the pseudonym Lloyd Fry.) He is most often noted as the author of the words to "Dallas Blues" in the form it became known; he also wrote both words and music for a remarkable set of six World War I songs published by Frank K. Root as part of Songs of the Camps: "Private Flynn," "Private Percy Prim," "Private Arkansas Bill," "Private Alexander," "At the Funny Page Ball," and "My Uncle Sammy Gals." These evidence skill and wit, making accomplished use of the emerging language of jazz and playing musically upon ethnic stereotypes. Other songs, like "My Mother" and "Roses of Memory" were designed for his own somewhat elevated style of ballad singing. In 1940 he penned an unpublished campaign song, "Let Dewey Do It," his last composition.
