= I Wish You Love (Keely Smith album) =

Studio album by Keely Smith
- Released: 1957 (Capitol T-914, mono) & 1959 (Capitol ST-914, stereo)
- Studio: Capitol Studio A (Hollywood)
- Genres: Jazz; Traditional pop
- Label: Capitol
- Producer: Voyle Gilmore

Keely Smith chronology
I Wish You Love (1957)	Politely! (1958)

Professional ratings
Review scores
Source	Rating
AllMusic	4.5/5 stars

I Wish You Love is the debut solo album by Keely Smith. It was released in 1957 by Capitol Records as T-914 (mono) and ST-914 (stereo). The arranger and conductor was Nelson Riddle.

== Track listing ==
The track sequence on album cover differs from the LP label: Below list is from the label.

1. "I Wish You Love" (Léo Chauliac, Charles Trenet, Albert A. Beach)
2. "You Go To My Head" (J. Fred Coots, Haven Gillespie)
3. "When Your Lover Has Gone" (Einar Aaron Swan)
4. "I Understand" (Mabel Wayne, Kim Gannon)
5. "Fools Rush In" (Rube Bloom, Johnny Mercer)
6. "Don't Take Your Love From Me" (Henry Nemo)
7. "Imagination" (Jimmy Van Heusen, Johnny Burke)
8. "If We Never Meet Again" (Louis Armstrong, Horace Gerlach)
9. "As You Desire Me" (Allie Wrubel)
10. "Mr. Wonderful" (Jerry Bock, George David Weiss, Larry Holofcener)
11. "When Day Is Done" (Buddy DeSylva, Robert Katscher)
  Bonus Tracks on the CD (2003):
12. "All the Things You Are" (Jerome Kern, Oscar Hammerstein II)
13. "Just As Much" (Louis Prima, Keely Smith)
14. "Shy" (Kal Mann, Bernie Lowe) (flip side of "I Wish You Love" single)
15. "I Would Do Most Anything" (Mack David)
16. "Rock-A-Doodle-Doo" (Charles Singleton, Rose Marie McCoy)
17. "I Wish You Love" (Chauliac, Trenet, Beach)(1956 single version)

First pressings of this album on vinyl had turquoise labels in mono only. Second pressings had the Capitol dome logo on the left side in both mono (Capitol T-914) and stereo (Capitol ST-914). Original Capitol stereo issues (which was actually a re-recording to accommodate the "new" demand for stereo pressings) had the vocals out-of-phase, so playing them in mono caused the vocals to disappear.
