= Yankee Rose (song) =

Single by David Lee Roth

from the album Eat 'Em and Smile
- B-side: "Shyboy"
- Released: June 18, 1986
- Recorded: 1986
- Genre: Hard rock; glam metal
- Length: 3:55
- Label: Warner Bros.
- Songwriters: David Lee Roth; Steve Vai
- Producer: Ted Templeman

David Lee Roth singles chronology
"Easy Street" (1985)	"Yankee Rose" (1986)	"Goin' Crazy" (1986)

Music video
- "Yankee Rose" on YouTube

"Yankee Rose" is a song by American rock singer David Lee Roth. It is Roth's first single from his debut solo studio album Eat 'Em and Smile (1986). Like the rest of the album, the music features the prominent electric guitar of the song co-writer, Steve Vai.

The lyrics contain allusions to the American national anthem and Irving Berlin's "God Bless America", as well as July 4, independence, flag unfurling, rocket flare, fire crackers, apple pie, and her torch light, was recorded as a tribute to the Statue of Liberty as the statue was completing a major renovation for the 100th anniversary of its dedication in 1886:

"coast to coast, sea to shining sea, hey sister, you're the perfect host"

"...nothing like her in the whole world".

The song was Roth's third top 20 hit, the first two being covers of "California Girls" (peak number three) and "Just a Gigolo/I Ain't Got Nobody" (peak number 12). "Yankee Rose" peaked at number 16 on the Billboard Hot 100 chart.

It also appears as a radio tune on the 2002 video game Grand Theft Auto: Vice City on the rock station "V-Rock". A cover of the song is the title song for the video game Rumble Roses and Rumble Roses XX performed by Teresa James.

== Music video ==
Despite the song's topic, there were no visual references to the Statue of Liberty in the music video; rather it was a band performance with much sexual innuendo, bumping and grinding, as well as Roth rump shaking and even simulating coital insertion and thrusting with his microphone.

It featured a comical prolog of a gold medallion-wearing Indian convenience store clerk and various eccentric customers and their ensuing melodrama, as Bollywood-type music plays in the background from his radio. A mismatched newlywed couple arguing about a hotel room; a woman in a lei covered-bikini, buying a dozen boxes of breath mints, who passionately rebukes the clerk's advances; an obese woman screaming about over-the-counter laxatives, to which the clerk replies, "Not in my store you don't!"; a sleazy playboy in a suit (flanked by blondes in bikinis), played by Roth's co-creator Pete Angelus; and finally, David Lee Roth himself, shirtless, in the same blue and red tribal face paint seen on his album cover, head feathers and a loin cloth holding a spear, demanding "Give me a bottle of anything...and a glazed doughnut...to go," and cuts to the start of the song.

== Charts ==
Chart (1986)	Peak position
Australia (Kent Music Report)	33
Canada Top Singles (RPM)	29
US Billboard Hot 100	16
US Mainstream Rock (Billboard)	10
