= Root-Badger House =

Historic house in Illinois, United States

- U.S. National Register of Historic Places
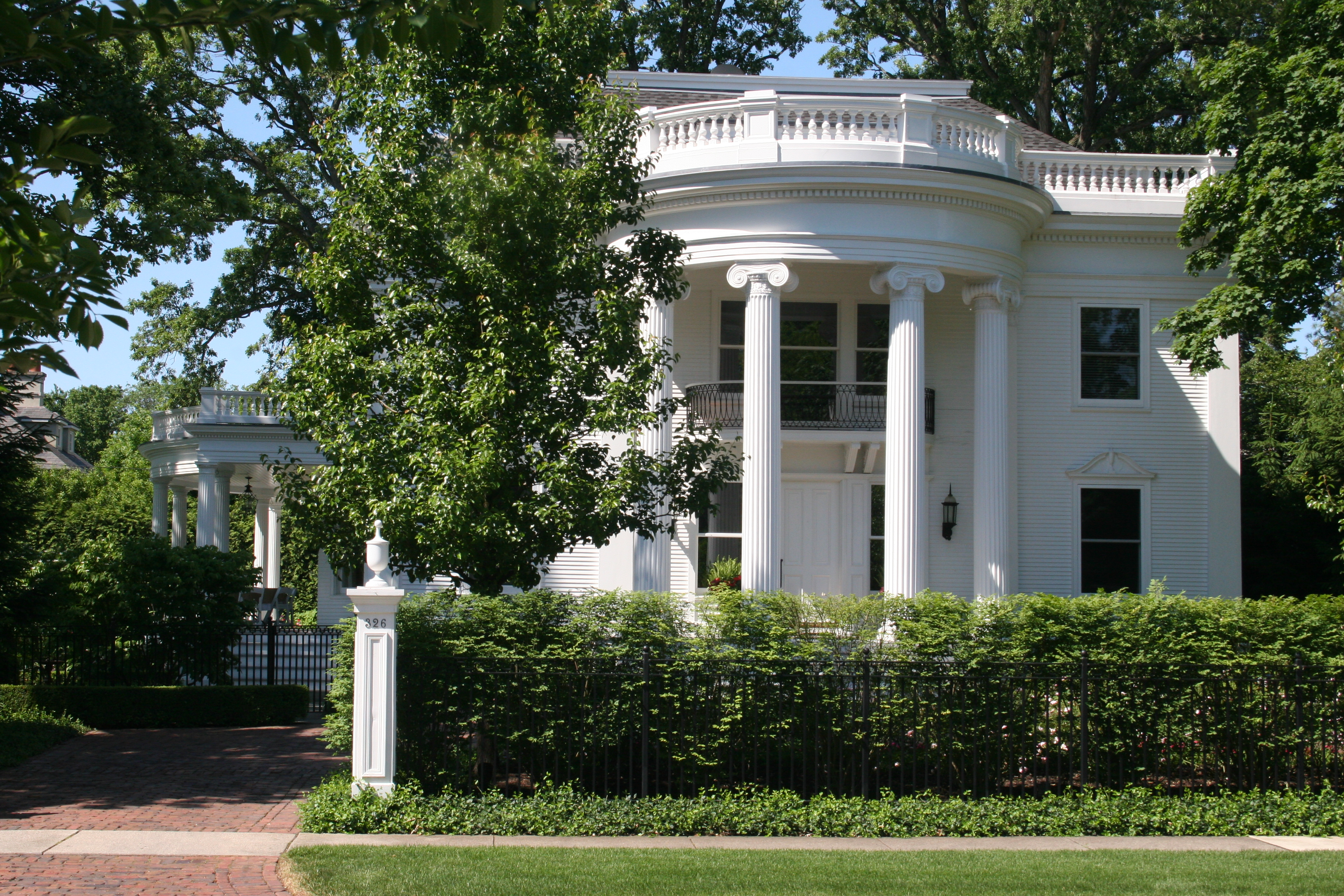

- Location within Chicago metropolitan area Location within Illinois Location within the United States
- Location: 326 Essex Rd., Kenilworth, Illinois
- Coordinates: 42°05′18″N 87°42′46″W
- Area: less than one acre
- Built: 1896
- Architect: Daniel H. Burnham
- Architectural style: Neoclassical
- NRHP reference No.: 92000550
- Added to NRHP: May 19, 1992

The Root-Badger House is a historic house at 326 Essex Road in Kenilworth, Illinois. The house was built in 1896 for music publisher Frank K. Root. Architect Daniel Burnham, who was the lead architect for the 1893 World's Columbian Exposition, designed the Neoclassical house. Burnham's work on the Columbian Exposition popularized Neoclassical architecture throughout the country, and his later works such as the Root-Badger House continued in this tradition. The house's design includes a two-story rounded portico supported by four Ionic columns, a balcony above the front door, an entablature with a dentillated cornice, and a balustrade encircling the roof.

The house was added to the National Register of Historic Places on May 19, 1992.
