= Frank K. Root =

Music publisher in Chicago

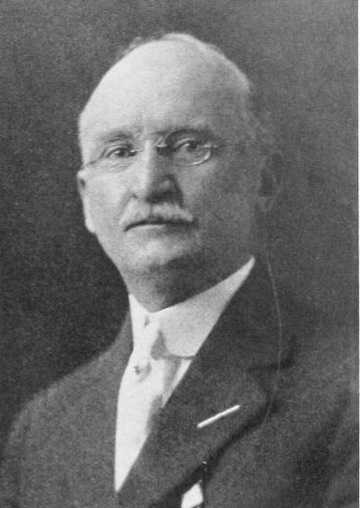
- Born: Frank Kimball Root; June 23, 1856; Jersey City, New Jersey
- Died: February 10, 1932 (aged 75); Kansas City, Missouri
- Resting place: Rosehill Cemetery
- Occupation: Music publisher
- Political party: Republican

Frank Kimball Root (1856–1932) was a music publisher in Chicago and the proprietor of Frank K. Root & Co. His father, Ebenezer Towner Root, co-founded Root & Cady. Among the many notable songs published by the firm is "I Ain't Got Nobody".

== Biography ==
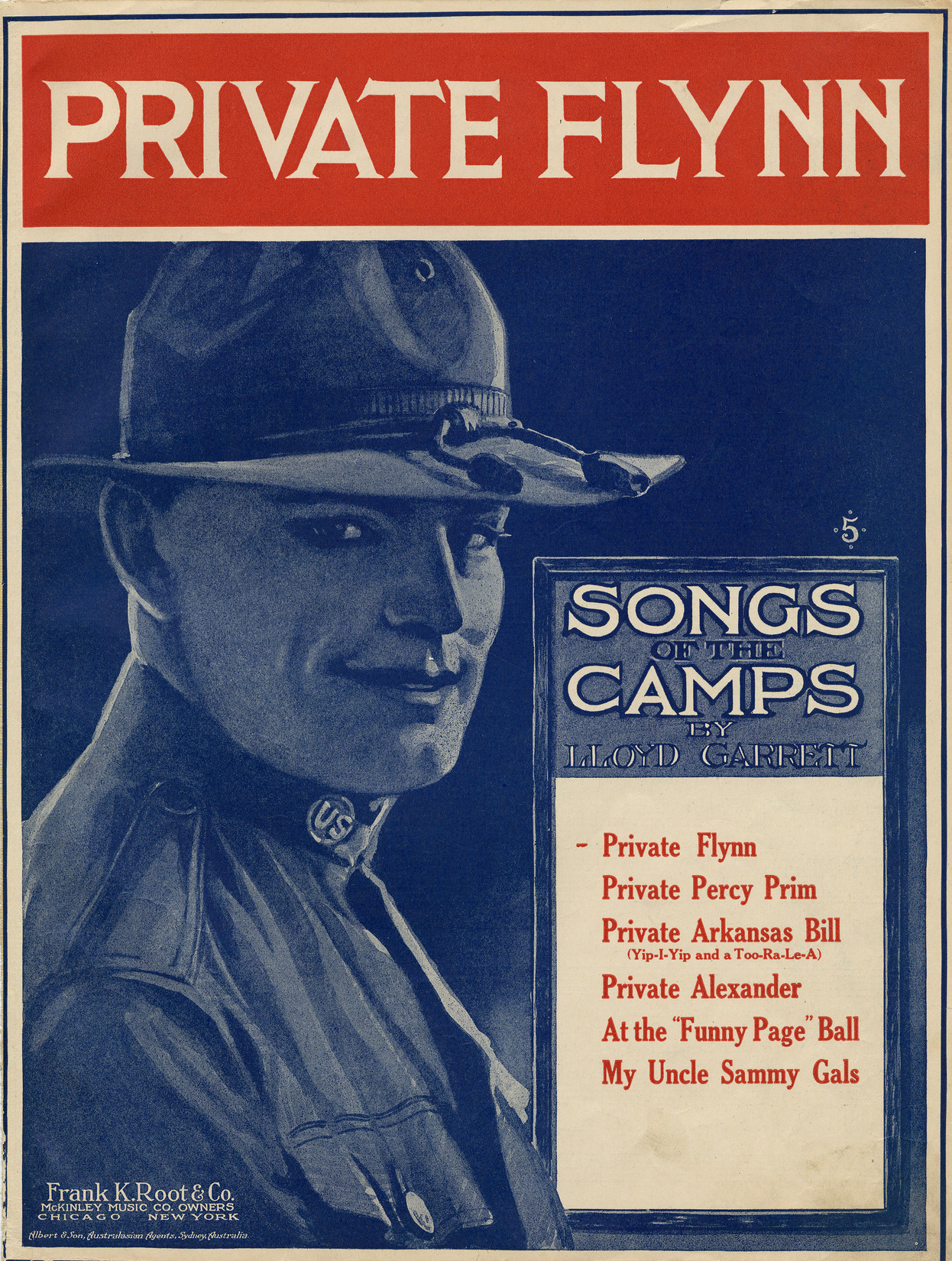
Private Flynn by Lloyd Garrett cover

Frank Kimball Root was born in Jersey City, New Jersey on June 23, 1856. He moved to Chicago with his family at a young age and was educated in public schools in Hyde Park.

He married Harriet Elizabeth Irwin on October 30, 1890, and they had three children.

In politics, he was a Republican.

Frank K. Root's firm had close ties to the McKinley Music Company.

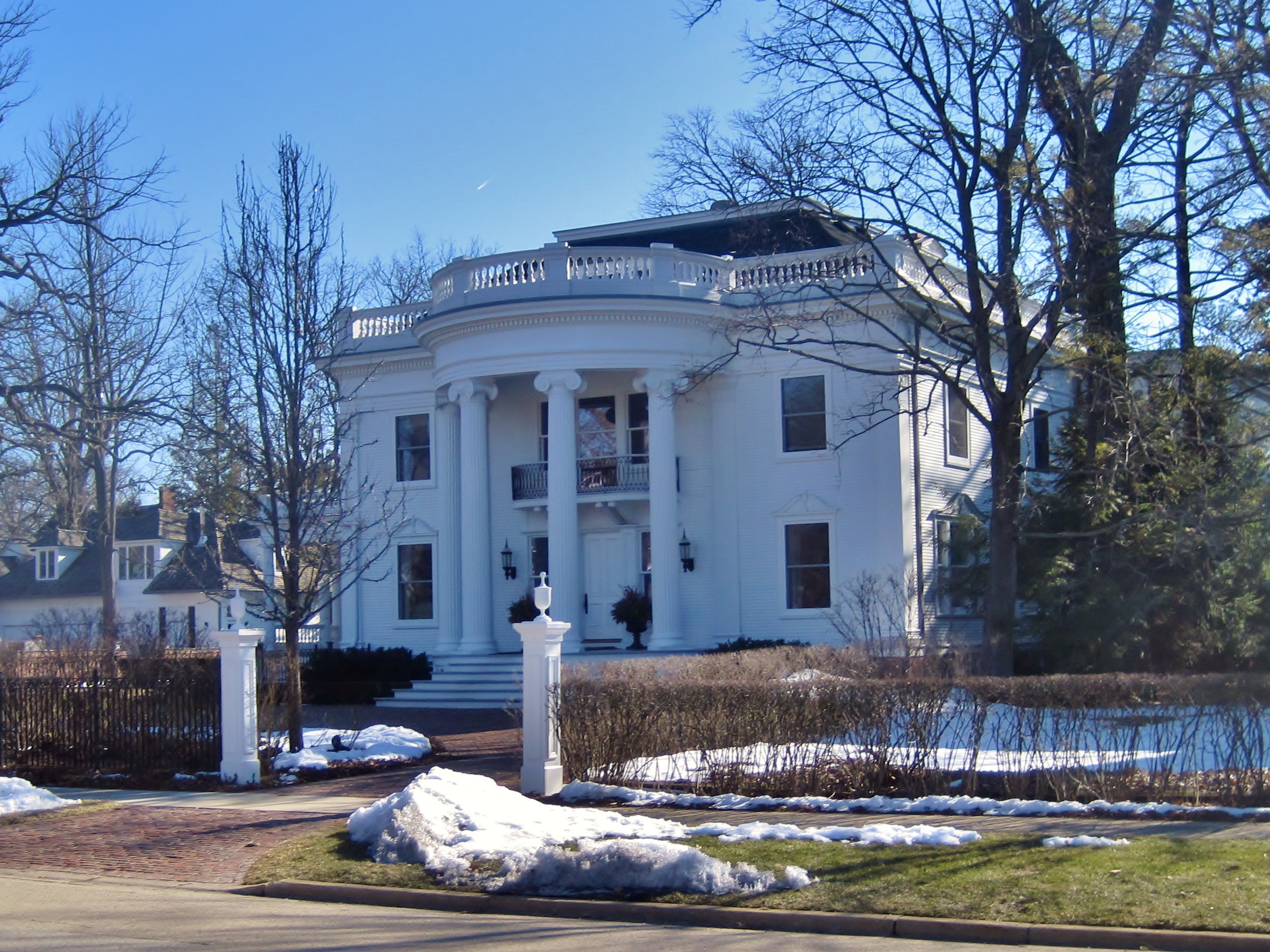
Root's home designed by Daniel Burnham

His home, the Root-Badger House at 326 Essex Rd. in Kenilworth, Illinois outside Chicago (also known as the Centennial House), was designed by Daniel Burnham and built by Paul Starrett. It is listed on the National Register of Historic Places (National Register of Historic Places listings in Cook County, Illinois).

Frank K. Root died in Kansas City, Missouri on February 10, 1932, and was buried at Rosehill Cemetery in Chicago.

== Background ==
His father cofounded Root & Cady. It was hit by the Great Chicago Fire of 1871 and bankrupted. It was reorganized several years later as The Root & Sons Music Company.

Songwriter George F. Root was his uncle.

== See also ==
- William Lewis & Son Co.
- Leo Feist, publisher in New York City
