= Politely! =

Studio album by Keely Smith
- Released: 1958
- Recorded: 1958
- Genre: Traditional pop, jazz
- Length: 34:41
- Label: Capitol T1073
- Producer: Voyle Gilmore

Keely Smith chronology
I Wish You Love (1957)	Politely! (1958)	Be My Love (1959)

Politely! is a 1958 album by Keely Smith, with arrangements by Billy May.

== Reception ==
The initial Billboard magazine review from October 20, 1958 commented that "Miss Smith really has a way with a song. Her ballads are lush and lovely and she swings on the up-tempo tunes. ...Attractive cover drawing of the chick will attract".

The album was reviewed by Dave Nathan for Allmusic who wrote that "The program balances up-tempo numbers and ballads with matching May orchestrations. The slower numbers are enhanced by strings, while the faster numbers feature Mays's trademark fluttering flutes juxtaposed with blaring brass". Nathan praised Smith's "...earnestness with which she delivered each song, regardless of tempo. This left the impression that she sincerely believed in each word of the lyrics".

== Track listing ==
1. "Sweet and Lovely" (Gus Arnheim, Jules LeMare, Harry Tobias) – 3:44
2. "Cocktails for Two" (Sam Coslow, Arthur Johnston) – 2:53
3. "The Song Is You" (Oscar Hammerstein II, Jerome Kern) – 3:11
4. "I'll Get By (As Long as I Have You)" (Fred E. Ahlert, Roy Turk) – 2:10
5. "Lullaby of the Leaves" (Bernice Petkere, Joe Young) – 2:17
6. "On the Sunny Side of the Street" (Dorothy Fields, Jimmy McHugh) – 3:00
7. "I Can't Get Started" (Vernon Duke, Ira Gershwin) – 3:25
8. "I'll Never Smile Again" (Ruth Lowe) – 3:06
9. "S'posin'" (Paul Denniker, Andy Razaf) – 2:38
10. "East of the Sun (And West of the Moon)" (Brooks Bowman) – 3:25
11. "All the Way" (Sammy Cahn, Jimmy Van Heusen) – 3:04
12. "I Never Knew I Could Love Anybody (Like I'm Loving You)" (Raymond B. Egan, Roy Marsh, Thomas Pitts) – 1:48

== Personnel ==
- Keely Smith – vocals
- Billy May – arranger
- Jim Jonson – cover illustration
- Voyle Gilmore – producer
