= I Ain't Got Nobody =

1915 song

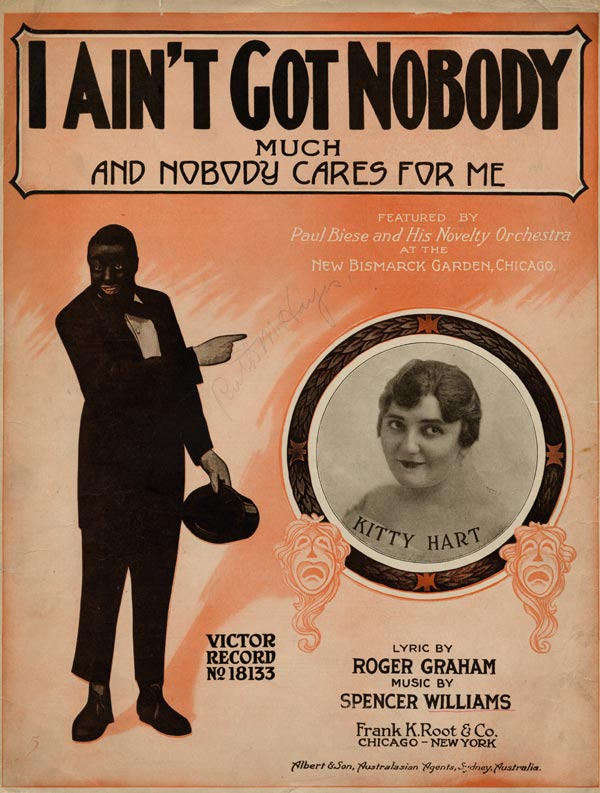
- Sheet music cover

Song
- Published: 1915
- Genre: Jazz
- Composer: Spencer Williams
- Lyricist: Roger A. Graham

Audio
- Recording of I Ain't Got Nobody, performed by Marion Harris (1921): file; help

"I Ain't Got Nobody" (sometimes referred to as "I'm So Sad and Lonely" or "I Ain't Got Nobody Much") is a popular song and copyrighted in 1915. It was first recorded by Marion Harris, and became a perennial standard, recorded many times over the following generations, in styles ranging from pop to jazz to country music.

== Composition ==
"I Ain't Got Nobody" is a ii-V-I composed in F major, that features a chromatic walkdown to the ii chord from the tonic in the A section, and then a typical resolution to the V (Dominant) chord. The B section is bluesy.

== Attribution ==
The song performed by The Jazzmania Quintette in a 1928 Vitaphone Varieties short

There are competing claims to the copyright, and thus who composed it is not clearly known.

Two copyrights from 1911 are attributed to Clarence Brandon and Billy Smythe, both St. Louis musicians. If true, this would be the first version of the words and music to "I Ain't Got Nobody". They claimed they published it that same year.

Chicago and Saint Louis ragtime pianist and blues composer Charles Warfield (1878–1955) claimed to have originally written the song and a copyright dated April 1914 attributes Warfield as the composer, David Young as the lyricist, and Marie Lucas as the arranger. This song is titled "I Ain't Got Nobody and Nobody Cares for Me".

A copyright entry from 1916 under a shorter title attributes the composition to Davy Peyton and Spencer Williams, and the lyrics to publisher Roger Graham. Also in 1916, Frank K. Root & Co., a Chicago publisher, acquired the Craig & Co. copyright, and later that year also acquired the Warfield-Young copyright.

== "Just a Gigolo/I Ain't Got Nobody" medley ==
"I Ain't Got Nobody" is best known in a form first recorded by Louis Prima in 1956, where it was paired in a medley with another old standard, "Just a Gigolo". Prima started pairing the songs in 1945 and the idea was revisited in the popular arrangement in a new, jive-and-jumping style, created by Sam Butera for Prima's 1950s Las Vegas stage show. The success of that act gained Prima a recording deal with Capitol Records, which aimed to capture on record the atmosphere of his shows. The first album, titled The Wildest! and released in November 1956, opened with "Just a Gigolo/I Ain't Got Nobody", which then became Prima's signature number and helped relaunch his career.

== See also ==
- List of pre-1920 jazz standards
