= James G. Ellis (composer) =

American musician and silent film theater pioneer

James Garfield Ellis (February 12, 1880 Dayton, Ohio – April 1, 1966 Los Angeles) was an American violinist, silent film theater pioneer, composer, lyricist, and music publisher.

== Early life ==
Ellis was the only male of eight children born to Jay Bartlett Ellis (born 1852), and Antonette Roberts (née Hall; 1856–1896), who were married in Elkhart, Indiana, May 28, 1875. Between 9 and 16 years of age, James G. Ellis lost six of his siblings—Pauline (died 1892), Jennie (1876–1889), Maud (1878–1896), Clara (1885–1888), Mary Winnifred (1887–1888), Mabel (1889–1991)—and also lost his mother, all to complications from diphtheria.

His father became a homeopathic physician in 1891. His only surviving sister, Helen became a nurse.

He lived during his childhood at 1212 Wayne Street, Dayton, Ohio. Ellis served in U.S. Army in the Spanish–American War (1898).

== Personal life ==
James G. Ellis was married three times. He first married Edna Lenore Roberts (1884–1987) in Merced County, California, November 27, 1902. They had two daughters. Edna and James lived in Los Banos, California in 1903.

Sometime between January 7, 1920, and 1930, James G. Ellis married Anna G. Long (born 1876).

When Ellis died in 1966, he was survived by this third wife, Phyllis Ellis, who was a music teacher. At the time of his death he lived in Los Angeles.

== Career ==
=== Silent film theaters ===
Ellis started out as a silent film theater entrepreneur in Utah Ellis had managed and controlled 3 movie theaters from 1909 to 1910, then sold them to individuals, including W.W. Hodkinson, who four years later was the founding president of Paramount Pictures.

Ellis and his father, who had been working at the Joie Theater in Ogden, purchased the Globe Theater in Ogden on October 1, 1909. (Note: The Globe Theatre in Brigham, Utah opened sometime before July 1908 and had been owned by Norman Mineur Stark (1880–1963) and Edgar Ingemar Stark (1872–1954) — brothers.) Ellis, as the new manager of the Globe, installed a stage in late November 1909 for the inclusion of vaudeville acts for movie audiences. Ellis then moved his family from Ogden to Brigham, Utah, leaving the management of the Joie Theater to his father.

In July 1909, Ellis, with at least one other partner, acquired Dreamland Theatre, located 2410 Washington Avenue, (Note: Charles Driscoll, and his brother George, new managers of the Dreamland Theatre in Ogden, redecorated it early March 1908. On November 1, 1908, the Dreamland changed tenants and reopened under the management of Fred Tout (né Frederick Moore Tout; 1867–1953), a popular Utah vocalist, and Fred Anderson, both as lessors.) and renamed it the Joie Theater. Ellis, who had been profitable in the venture, sold his interest on December 28, 1909, to Harry Ambrose Sims (1864–1921), William Wadsworth Hodkinson (1881–1971), Albert Scowcroft (1871–1918), and Charles Alexander Ziemer (1864–1929). (Note: The purchasers had owned the only other movie theater in Ogden — one of the first movie theaters in the country — which they opened in 1907. It was called the Electric Theatre, located on a hilltop, on 25th Street, just east of the Reed Hotel. On April 23, 1909, the purchasers founded "The Progressive Motion and Picture Company" in Ogden — Scowcroft, president, Ziemer, vice-president, Hodkinson, secretary, Sims, treasurer. Those officers and Susie Sims (née Susan Mary Skinner; 1862–1917), Harry Sims' wife, formed the board. By October 1910, the same executives — Scowcroft, Sims, Ziemer, Hodkinson (and others) — were executives of the Alhambra Theater Company, an Ogden concern, that controlled 18 movie theaters in Utah, Idaho, and Nevada. Under their firms, they were vertically integrated in the movie business — theater ownership and operations, film production, film distribution, and strategic alliances. Hodkinson went on to become an incorporator and founding president of Paramount Pictures in 1914. Paramount was the first film distributor to operate nation-wide. Hodkinson became widely known as "the man who invented Hollywood".) (Note: In December 1910, the Joie was sold to Thomas C. Foley who, on January 1, 1911, converted it to a wholesale and retail liquor facility.) Ellis and his wife then moved to Salt Lake City.

On March 22, 1910, Ellis filed articles of incorporation in Salt Lake County for the Ellis Theater Company, taking over the Joy theater in Brigham, the Orpheum in Park City and the Luna in Springville. The officers were James G. Ellis, president; Max M. Florence (1865–1932), vice president; John Alphonso Rugar (1883–1970), secretary, treasurer; and Soren X. Christensen (1866–1942) and Louis B. Marcus (1880–1936) as additional directors.

On May 5, 1910, Max M. Florence (1865–1932) and Joseph Falsette (born 1880) purchased outright the Ellis Theater Company and changed the name to Florence Theater Company. (Note: On May 28, 1910, filed another name change, from Ellis Theater Company to the Embree Theater Company, the name reflecting his business partner, Otis E. Embree (1882–1926). The former new named entity became engaged in ownership and operation of theaters and the latter, distribution.)

=== Composer, lyricist, and music publisher ===
Ellis, as a popular songwriter in Chicago from 1910 to 1920, had some minor hits that include "The Tale the Tear Drop Told" and "I Am Dreaming Of My Irish Rose". As a music publisher during that same period, Ellis published his own compositions, as well as those of others, including works by Roger A. Graham and Harry L. Alford. Ellis had been a principal partner in five Chicago firms from 1913 to about 1920: (i) The Ellis & Armitage Music Publishing Company, (ii) Ellis & Co., (iiii) Craig-Ellis & Co., (iv) Acme Music Publishers, and (v) Phenix Music Publishers.

As a songwriter of sacred music, beginning around 1917, he became an exponent of Christian Science and, around 1920, became a Christian Science practitioner. Some of his sacred works endure today, particularly within Church of Christ (Science) congregations, including "Transfiguration", "Leave It With Him", "Rejoice, My Son, Rejoice", and "Love, Thrill My Heart". Sometime between 1920 and 1930, Ellis moved to California.

Ellis published the works of Roger A. Graham and Harry L. Alford.
