= Clarence E. Brandon Sr. =

Musician and composer

Clarence E. Brandon Sr. (1887–1962) was a writer, composer, and performer of ragtime music in the early twentieth century. He wrote or composed more than 50 songs from 1911 to 1947, including ragtime, jazz, and marches. While there are no known copies of music before 1911, his son, Clarence E. Brandon Jr., claimed his music-writing career began as far back as 1903. He published under many publishing companies, many his own, including Syndicate Music Company, Weile Publishing Company Inc., Buck and Lowney, Brandon and Josse Publishing Company, Orpheum Music Company, Brandon Music Company, S.S. Kresge, and Stark Music Company.

In 1911, Brandon wrote the first "I Ain't Got Nobody" which shares some similarities to the well-known 1915 song of the same title by Spencer Williams. Brandon claimed the Williams song was written in response to Brandon's refusal to sell the publishing rights to his "I Ain't Got Nobody," and as a result his version was shelved (sold only under the counter).

Later in life, Brandon toured the country with his wife, Margaret Celestine Josse Brandon, and children, Marluel and Clarence Jr., performing Vaudeville and motion picture prologues.

His hit songs include "Ten Penny Rag," "Domino Rag," "I Ain't Got Nobody," and "The Educator Rag."
