= List of number-one hits of 1969 (Mexico) =

This is a list of songs that reached number one in Mexico in 1969, according to Billboard magazine with data provided by Radio Mil.

== Chart history ==
Issue date	Song	Artist(s)	Ref.
March 15	"Those Were The Days"	Mary Hopkin / Los Rockin' Devils (Note: Their version of the song was titled "Esos fueron los días".)	
March 22	"Those Were The Days"	Mary Hopkin / Los Rockin' Devils	
March 29	"Crimson and Clover"	Tommy James and the Shondells	
April 5	"Crimson and Clover"	Tommy James and the Shondells	
April 12	"Volverás por mí"	Chelo y su Conjunto	
April 19	"Volverás por mí"	Chelo y su Conjunto	
May 3	"Volverás por mí"	Chelo y su Conjunto	
May 10	"Volverás por mí"	Chelo y su Conjunto	
May 17	"Te deseo amor"	La Rondalla de Saltillo	
May 24	"Te deseo amor"	La Rondalla de Saltillo	
May 31	"Te deseo amor"	La Rondalla de Saltillo	
June 14	"Te deseo amor"	La Rondalla de Saltillo	
June 21	"Te deseo amor"	La Rondalla de Saltillo	
June 28	"Te deseo amor"	La Rondalla de Saltillo	
July 5	"Te deseo amor"	La Rondalla de Saltillo	
July 12	"Get Back"	The Beatles	
July 19	"Get Back"	The Beatles	
July 26	"Get Back"	The Beatles	
August 2	"Get Back"	The Beatles	
August 9	"Get Back"	The Beatles	
August 16	"The Ballad of John and Yoko"	The Beatles	
August 23	"The Ballad of John and Yoko"	The Beatles	
August 30	"Get Back"	The Beatles	
September 6	"Get Back"	The Beatles	
September 13	"Get Back"	The Beatles	
September 20	"Quero me casar contigo"	Roberto Carlos	
September 27	"Quero me casar contigo"	Roberto Carlos	
October 4	"Quero me casar contigo"	Roberto Carlos	
October 11	"Te vi llorando"	Marco Antonio Vázquez	
October 18	"Te vi llorando"	Marco Antonio Vázquez	
October 25	"Te vi llorando"	Marco Antonio Vázquez	
November 1	"Te vi llorando"	Marco Antonio Vázquez	
November 8	"Sugar, Sugar"	The Archies	
November 15	"Sugar, Sugar"	The Archies	
November 22	"Sugar, Sugar"	The Archies	
December 6	"Sugar, Sugar"	The Archies	
December 13	"Sugar, Sugar"	The Archies	
December 20	"Sugar, Sugar"	The Archies	
December 27	"Sugar, Sugar"	The Archies	

=== By country of origin ===
Number-one artists:

Country of origin	Number of artists	Artists
Mexico	4	Los Rockin' Devils
Mexico	4	Chelo y su Conjunto
Mexico	4	La Rondalla de Saltillo
Mexico	4	Marco Antonio Vázquez
United Kingdom	2	Mary Hopkin
United Kingdom	2	The Beatles
United States	2	Tommy James and the Shondells
United States	2	The Archies
Brazil	1	Roberto Carlos

Number-one compositions (it denotes the country of origin of the song's composer[s]; in case the song is a cover of another one, the name of the original composition is provided in parentheses):

Country of origin	Number of compositions	Compositions
Mexico	2	"Volverás por mi"
Mexico	2	"Te vi llorando"
United States	2	"Crimson and Clover"
United States	2	"Sugar, Sugar"
United Kingdom	2	"Get Back"
United Kingdom	2	"The Ballad of John and Yoko"
Brazil	1	"Quero me casar contigo"
France	1	"Te deseo amor" ("Que reste-t-il de nos amours?")
Russia	1	"Those Were the Days" ("Дорогой длинною")

== See also ==
- 1969 in music

== Sources ==
- Print editions of the Billboard magazine from March 15 to December 27, 1969.
