= Roger A. Graham =

American lyricist and music publisher

- Born: June 12, 1885; Providence, Rhode Island, US
- Died: October 25, 1938 (aged 53); Chicago, Illinois, US
- Occupations: Lyricist; composer; singer; music publisher
- Years active: 1906–1920

Roger A. Graham (12 June 1885 – 25 October 1938) was an American lyricist, composer, singer, and music publisher who flourished from 1906 to 1920 — a period that included World War I, the golden age of Tin Pan Alley (from about 1915 to 1920), the dawn of the Jazz Age (circa 1914), and the silent film era. Graham was a proponent of vaudeville and burlesque songs. But as a lyricist and publisher, Graham is most remembered for having been an exponent of blues songs.

From about 1914 to 1919, Graham's success and popularity as lyricist and publisher led to close friendships with stars of the stage and silent screen — George M. Cohan, Sophie Tucker, Al Jolson, Eddie Cantor, and many others.

But after failing to have a hit as a writer or publisher for three or four years, and a year after the start of Prohibition, Graham quit writing music and publishing in 1921 and took a job as a department manager at Mandell Brothers, a large department store.

In 1938, nine years after the Wall Street Crash and in the throes of the Great Depression, Graham died alone and penniless in the Cook County Hospital charity ward, reportedly unknown to those attending him and without any kin or friend mourning at his side. Graham's remains would have been interred in a pauper's grave were it not for an alert attendant at the Cook County Morgue, who, after recognizing his name on a list, contacted a sister, Elizabeth (Mrs. Lawrence Joseph Mulhearn; 1887–1982) of Bronxville, New York, and his ex-wife of eight years, May Olivette Hill (1888–1978) of Los Angeles.

According to Hill, his lyrics from "I Ain't Got Nobody", and other melancholy songs that made him popular, seemed to foreshadow his decline and ensuing loneliness.

== Federal court case ==
Graham's firm, Roger Graham Music Publisher, published the "Livery Stable Blues". It was recorded in 1917 by the Original Dixieland Jass Band on the Victor label and is widely acknowledged as the first commercially recorded jazz. It was the first recording to sell a million records and its success established jazz as a popular genre. During production, Victor executives re-titled the B-side of Victor 18255 as "Barnyard Blues" in an effort to avoid offending target audiences with a seemingly vulgar title. Due to a labeling error, however, the record itself retained the band's original title.

In June 1917, Roger Graham published "Livery Stable Blues", attributing the composition to Alcide Nunez (clarinetist) and Ray Lopez (cornetist; né Raymond Edward Lopez; 1889–1970), who were New Orleans jazz community colleagues. Months later, Leo Feist published virtually the same music under the title "Barnyard Blues", attributing the composition to Nick LaRocca, the director of the ODJB and cornetist on the ODJB recording.

Publishing it landed Graham in federal court with a charge of pirating the theme — Max Hart (né, phonetic: Numkovsky; 1874–1950), manager for ODJB, et al. v. Roger Graham (1917). Graham won acquittal after Judge George A. Carpenter asked Nunez to define the blues, whereupon he made his famous reply: "Judge, blues is blues — a little off key but harmony against the rules". The judge ruled that the blues could not be copyrighted, resulting in neither party having a copyright. The judge also expressed doubt that musicians unable to read or write music could be said to have composed anything.

== Career highlights ==
Rhode Island

Graham was a graduate of dental college.

A 1900 US Census lists Roger Graham as an office boy in Providence, living with his family at 320 Dyer Street. A 1907 City Directory lists Roger A. Graham as a song writer residing in Wickford, Rhode Island, on Champlain Street, near Phillips Street.

First marriage

On June 1, 1906, Graham married Bessie H. (née Spink; 1883–1969) in Brooklyn, who was born and raised in Rhode Island. Records indicate that she had been divorced twice before remarrying (in 1916) her third and final husband, Frederick Charles Gilbert (1891–1944), a pharmacists from Rhode Island. The 1910 US Census lists Roger and Bessie as being married. Roger and Bessie apparently divorced sometime between 1910 and 1914, because Roger became engaged to May Hill in 1914.

Move from Providence to Chicago in 1910

According to the 1910 US Census, taken April 26 and 29, 1910, Roger and Bessie were married and living in Providence. But also, according to his obituary in the Chicago Tribune, Roger Graham moved to Chicago in 1910.

Theodore Morse Music Company, Chicago

Early in 1913, Graham had been the professional manager in the Chicago office of Theodore Morse Music Company. Later that year, he was general manager of Morse's western branch in San Francisco. In December of 1913, he became manager of its New York office. May Olivette Hill (1888–1978), a Chicago-based pianist, singer, and composer, was Graham's assistant at Morse.

Ellis & Co., Chicago

Around July 1914, Graham became road manager for Ellis & Co. Graham became engaged to May Hill around September 1914.

In 1915, Graham was a partner and the general manager of Craig, Ellis & Co., later known as Craig & Co. The name change was the result of James G. Ellis severing his relationship with the firm. Graham was mentioned as manager of Craig & Company as late as April 5, 1919. Craig & Co. was mentioned as being for sale in 1916.

When Graham founded his own publishing house in Chicago around 1917, he was first located in the Randolph Building at 145 North Clark Street, at Randolph Street.

Marriage to May Olivette Hill

Graham married Hill on September 28, 1918, in Chicago. She had been the professional manager in the Chicago office of Ellis & Co., Craig, Ellis & Co., and Craig & Co. Throughout their relationship, from before their engagement in 1914, they were song writing partners, she writing the melodies, he writing the lyrics. Beginning around 1910, Hill, who had grown up in New Berlin, Ohio, had been a silent film pianist and organist. Her foray into Chicago publishing houses began as a song plugger. Hill also had been a pioneer of radio, working as a composer for a WGN radio show hosted by Quin Ryan at the Drake Hotel.

Retirement from music

Graham retired from music publishing in March of 1921 and became a department manager at the Mandel Brothers store.

Divorce

Hill filed for divorce on March 24, 1925, in Chicago. Among other things, she was unhappy over Roger Graham's intolerance towards her invalid parents — Isaac B. Hill (1858–1927) and Anna Elizabeth (née Druckenbrod; 1865–1953) — when they were at the home of May and Roger.

Roger Graham, 143 Dearborn Street

According to his obituary in the Chicago Tribune, Roger Graham Publishing Company was in the Tribune Building at 143 Dearborn Street until 1922. Beginning around 1919, many publishers had moved to the State-Lake Building — built in 1919. Graham, after 1922, conducted his business from home. When he died, he was living at 1429 East 66th Place, Chicago. In 1922 the Tribune Building was torn down.

Theory over the etymology of the word, "Jazz"

Graham, disputing many other claims over the origination of jazz, opined that Jasbo Brown, a pioneer of jazz in New Orleans, did it first in Chicago, around 1914.

== Addresses ==
- 1916, 1918: 145 N. Clark, Chicago
- 1918: 143 N. Dearborn, Chicago
- 1919: SEC Randolph and Dearborn Streets, Chicago
- 1920: 143 N. Dearborn, Chicago
- 1928, 1930: State-Lake Building, 190 N. State Street, Chicago

== Death ==
At the height of his career, around 1918, his friends were stars of the stage and silent screen — George M. Cohan, Sophie Tucker, Al Jolson, Eddie Cantor, and many others. Two decades later, he died, only aged 53, but alone, almost forgotten, in a charity ward at the Cook County Hospital in Chicago. When his body had been taken to the Cook County Morgue, an attendant recognized the name on his files and the county notified his sister in New York and his ex-wife of 10 years and song writing collaborator, May Hill, whom he divorced in 1936. "It's strange that everyone should have forgotten Roger", Hill remarked. "The songs he wrote seem to fit the loneliness of his death". He was buried in Palos Hills Memorial Park (aka Mount Vernon Memorial) in Cook County.

== Extant music ==
Graham wrote lyrics to nearly 200 songs. His biggest hit, "I Ain't Got Nobody", is a blues that became a perennial standard. As of 2013, in jazz recordings alone, it has been recorded 311 times according to The Jazz Discography tune database; and it has been used in 23 films according to IMDb.

Craig & Co. of Chicago, of which Graham was manager and partner, copyrighted it in 1916, and attributed the music to Spencer Williams and Dave Peyton and the lyrics to Graham.

A 1915 manuscript copyright credits the music to Williams and Peyton, no mention of Graham.

Attribution, however, was clouded by two earlier works. David Young copyrighted it in 1914, attributing the music to Charles Warfield (1878–1955) and the lyrics to himself.

Clarence E. Brandon Sr. claimed that the more well-known Williams-Graham-Peyton song was written in response to his refusal to sell the publishing rights to his 1911 "I Ain't Got Nobody", which, according to him, was shelved and sold only under the counter. Brandon's version was apparently not widely disputed.

The two disputed versions were cleared in 1916 when Graham and Williams sold their rights to Frank K. Root & Co., a Chicago publisher (né Frank Kimball Root; 1856–1932), and later that year, Warfield and Young sold their rights to Root. Root henceforth published the work both ways; but the prevailing attribution has gone to Graham and Williams.

R.A. Graham, Wickford, Rhode Island

- "Please", lyrics & music by Graham (1906)

Roger A. Graham, Providence, Rhode Island

- "Down At Vanity Fair", lyrics by Frederick James Pearsall (1893–1975), music by Graham (1908)

M. Witmark & Sons, New York

- "You're Just The One For Me", lyrics by Graham, music by Bernard Edgar Fay (1883–1941) (1907); OCLC 498799258
- "Dreary Moon", lyrics by Frederick James Pearsall (1983–1975), music by Graham (1909); OCLC 853604545, 497748690

Pearsall & Graham, Providence, Rhode Island

- "Narraganset Pier", lyrics by Frederick J. Pearsall, music by Graham (1908)
- "No One Else Will Do", lyrics by Frederick J. Pearsall, music by Graham (1909); OCLC 755713761

Ellis & Co.

- "It's The Busy Little Bee That Gets The Honey", lyrics by Graham, music by Frederick J. Pearsall (1914); OCLC 499153352

Craig, Ellis & Company, Chicago

- "Everybody's Dippy Now", lyrics by Graham, music by May Olivette Hill (1888–1978) (1915)
- "I Believe in You", lyrics by Graham, music by May Olivette Hill (1915)
- "Peggy from Panama", lyrics by Graham, music by May Olivette Hill (1914); OCLC 780755685

Craig & Company, Chicago

- "Dublin Mary Brown", lyrics by Marvin Lee & Graham, music by May Olivette Hill (1916); OCLC 499068405
- "I Ain't Got Nobody Much and Nobody Cares For Me", lyrics by Graham, music by Spencer Williams & Davey Peyton (1916); OCLC 270680176
- "I've Lost All Confidence in You", lyrics by Graham, music by James White (1915); OCLC 498154513
- "You'll Want Me Back Some Day", lyrics by Graham, music by May Olivette Hill (1915); OCLC 498725526

Roger Graham, Chicago

- "A Little Love, A Little Kiss, Would Go a Long, Long Way", lyrics by Graham, music by May Olivette Hill (1915); OCLC 498725155
- "I Believe In You", lyrics by Graham, music by May Olivette Hill (1915)
- "You'll Want Me Back Some Day" (1915), lyrics by Graham, music by May Olivette Hill (1915)
- "I Ain't Got Nobody Much and Nobody Cares For Me", lyrics by Graham, music by Spencer Williams & Dave Peyton (1916) †
- "He's My Lovin' Jelly-Roll", lyrics by Graham, music by Spencer Williams (1917)
- "Flower Garden Blues", lyrics by Graham, music by James White (1919); OCLC 64589486 †
- "That Ragtime Symphony Band", lyrics Graham, music by May Hill & Spencer Williams (1917)
- "San Diego", lyrics by Graham & Walter Hirsch (1891–1967), music by May Hill (1917)
- "Has Anybody Seen My Corinne?", lyrics by Graham, music by Louis "Lukie" Johnson (1918); OCLC 732332294
- "Goodbye My Chocolate Soldier Boy", lyrics by Graham, music by James White (1918); OCLC 61744887
- "I Know Somebody Who's Crazy About You", lyrics by Graham, music by James White (1919); OCLC 224046998
- "Jazz Band Blues", lyrics by Graham & Walter Hirsch (1891–1967), music by James White (1919); OCLC 51029016
- "What a Real Canadian Can Do", lyrics by Graham, music by Billy Johnson (1916); OCLC 499060491
- "What a Real American Can Do", lyrics by Graham, music by May Olivette Hill & Billy Johnson (1917)
- "In Those Dear Old Dixie days", lyrics by Graham & Walter Hirsch (1891–1967), music by James White (1920); OCLC 71259987

Frank K. Root & Co, Chicago, New York City

- "Everybody Loves a Big Brass Band", lyrics by Graham, music by May Olivette Hill (1917)
- "I Ain't Got Nobody Much", Roger Graham, music by Spencer Williams (1916); OCLC 51198520 †
- "If You've Never Been in Dreamland You've Never Been in Love", lyrics by Graham & Marvin Lee, music by May Olivette Hill (1917)
- "You Are the Image of Mother (That's Why I Love You)", lyrics by Graham & Marvin Lee, music by May Olivette Hill (1916)

McKinley Music Co., Chicago

- "I'm a Real Kind Mama: Lookin' For a Lovin' Man", lyrics by Graham, music by Maceo Pinkard (1917); OCLC 60579851

May Hill, Hollywood, California

- "That Jazbo Dixieland Band", lyrics by Graham, music by May Olivette Hill & Spencer Williams (1971)
- "When a Boy Loves a Girl and a Girl Loves a Boy", lyrics by Graham, music by May Olivette Hill & James White (1971)

Joe Slater, Sydney, Australia (between 1911 and 1920)

- "Flower Garden Blues", lyrics by Graham, music by James White (1919); OCLC 221465190 †
- "Down On Bull Frogs' Isle", lyrics by Graham, music by James White (1920); NLA 11280327; OCLC 497266366, 221724923

Copyright renewals
May Hill, Evanston, Illinois

- "If You Loved Me", English & French lyrics by Graham, music by Frederick J. Pearsall (1983–1975) (1945)
- "I'm Satisfied To Be Just What I Am", lyrics by Graham, music by Frederick J. Pearsall (1983–1975) (1945)

† Multiple publishers
‡ James White (aka "Professor" James "Slap Rags" White), also a ragtime pianist

== Selected discography ==
"I Ain't Got Nobody"

- Marion Harris with orchestra, (B-side), Victor Records 18133 Matrix B-18192 (1927); OCLC 319947535; (audio on YouTube)
- Coon-Sanders Orchestra, Victor Records (1927); OCLC 319947535 (audio on YouTube)

Recorded in Chicago, June 25, 1927
Carleton Coon (vocals, drums, director), Joe Sanders (vocals, piano, director); Bob Pope, Joe Richolson (trumpets), Rex Downing (trombone), Harold Thiell, John Thiell (clarinet, alto sax), Floyd Estep (clarinet tenor sax), Russ Stout (banjo), Elmer Krebs (brass bass)

== Filmography ==
According to IMDb, "I Ain't Got Nobody" has 23 film credits. "Shim-Me-Sha-Wabble", a 1917 hit composed by Spencer Williams and published by Graham endures today as the impetus for the shimmy, a dance move. Graham sold the copyright for "Shim-Me-Sha-Wabble" to the New York publishing firm of Joseph W. Stern. "Shim-Me-Sha-Wabble" was also used in the film Cinderella Man and was the name of a TV episode for Fox.
