= Keely Smith =

American jazz and popular music singer (1928–2017)

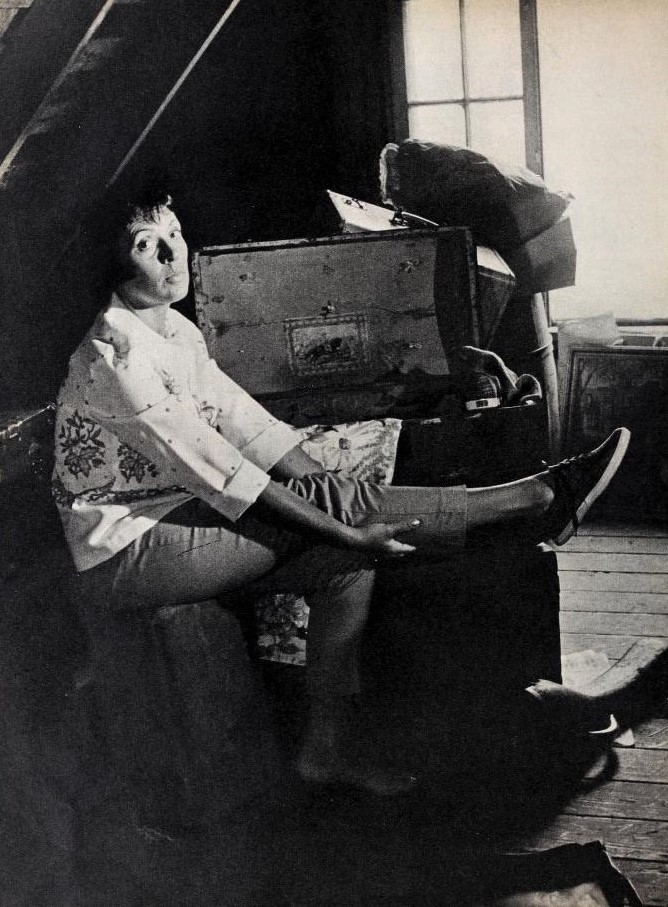
- Smith in 1960

Background information
- Born: Dorothy Jacqueline Keely; March 9, 1928; Norfolk, Virginia, U.S.
- Died: December 16, 2017 (aged 89) Palm Springs, California, U.S.
- Genres: Jazz; pop
- Occupation: Singer
- Years active: 1939–2011
- Labels: Capitol, Dot, Reprise
- Spouses: Matteo Gambardella Jr. (m. 1947; div. 1950) Louis Prima (m. 1953; div. 1961); Two children Jimmy Bowen (m. 1965; div. 1969) Bobby Milano (m. 1975; died 2006)

Dorothy Jacqueline Keely (March 9, 1928 (Note: The reference work The Encyclopedia of Native Music: More Than a Century of Recordings from Wax Cylinder to the Internet gives Smith's date of birth as March 9, 1932.) – December 16, 2017), professionally known as Keely Smith, was an American jazz and popular music singer, who performed and recorded extensively in the 1950s with her then-husband Louis Prima, and throughout the 1960s as a solo artist.

Smith married Prima in 1953. The couple were stars throughout the entertainment business, including stage, television, motion pictures, hit records, and cabaret acts. They won a Grammy in 1959, the award's inaugural year, for their smash hit, "That Old Black Magic", which remained on the charts for 18 weeks.

== Early years ==
Smith was born in Norfolk, Virginia; her ancestry was Irish and Cherokee. Jesse Smith, her stepfather, was a carpenter, and her mother took in laundry to earn money to buy gowns for Smith to wear when she performed. She attended Maury High School.

== Career ==
When Smith was 11 years old, she sang regularly as a cast member of The Joe Brown Radio Gang program on a Norfolk station. At age 14, Smith sang with a naval air station band led by Saxie Dowell. At 15, she got her first paying job with the Earl Bennett band. She saw Louis Prima perform in New York City in 1949. (Note: The Encyclopedia of Native Music: More Than a Century of Recordings from Wax Cylinder to the Internet says, "In 1948, entertainer Louis Prima appeared in her hometown of Norfolk, Virginia, and hired Smith at an audition.") They recorded together in 1949 and married on July 13, 1953.

Their songs included Johnny Mercer's and Harold Arlen's "That Old Black Magic", which was a Top 20 hit in the US in 1958. At the 1st Annual Grammy Awards in 1959, Smith and Prima won the first Grammy for Best Performance by a Vocal Group or Chorus for "That Old Black Magic". Her deadpan act was popular with fans. The duo followed up with the minor successes "I've Got You Under My Skin" and "Bei Mir Bist Du Schoen", a cover of the 1937 Andrews Sisters hit.

Smith and Prima's act was a mainstay of the Las Vegas lounge scene for much of the 1950s. Smith was caricatured as "Squealy Smith" in Bob Clampett's 1960 Beany and Cecil episode "So What and the Seven Whatnots", a Snow White spoof in a Vegas setting, though her actual voice was not used.

Smith appeared with Prima in the movie Hey Boy! Hey Girl!, singing "Fever", and also appeared in and sang on the soundtrack of the previous year's film Thunder Road. Her song in Thunder Road was "Whippoorwill". She also appeared in the film Senior Prom.

Her first big solo hit was "I Wish You Love" in 1957, and it brought her a Grammy award nomination for Best Vocal Performance, Female. Her debut album by that same title achieved gold status. In 1961, Smith divorced Prima. She then signed with Reprise Records, where her musical director was Nelson Riddle.

In 1965, she had Top 20 hits in the United Kingdom with an album of Beatles compositions, Keely Smith Sings The John Lennon—Paul McCartney Songbook, and a single, "You're Breaking My Heart", which reached No. 14 in April.

Smith worked with Frank Sinatra on his "Concepts" album, singing the classic duets, "How Are Ya' Fixed for Love?" and, "Nothing in Common." The Album released in 1992 as a compilation and was remastered in 1998.

She returned to singing in 1985, recording the album I'm in Love Again with Bud Shank, Bill Perkins and Bob Cooper. Her albums, Swing, Swing, Swing (2000), Keely Sings Sinatra (2001) for which she received a Grammy nomination, and Keely Swings Basie-Style With Strings (2002) won critical and popular acclaim. In 2008, she performed a duet with Kid Rock during the 50th Grammy Awards on "That Old Black Magic".

Smith earned positive reviews for her performances at Feinstein's nightclub in Manhattan in 2005. Said Variety: "Smith's bold, dark voice took firm hold on a handful of great standard tunes, and she swung hard", and The New Yorker called her "both legendary and underrated ... She can still sing the stuffing out of a ballad as well as swing any tune into the stratosphere."

According to a news release from her publicist issued upon her death, Smith was "very resolute in being in control of the trajectory of her career".

"Nobody will ever interfere with what I do on stage", Smith once told Theatermania. "Someone might have an opinion of something but, if I disagree with it, I'll go with my own thinking. I'm just a plain person. I sing like I talk — and, when I'm on stage, I talk just like I'm talking to you."

Smith's final performance was on February 13, 2011, at the Cerritos Performing Arts Center in Southern California.

== Personal life ==
Smith first married Matteo Gambardella Jr. on September 6, 1947 in Pasquotank County, North Carolina, before divorcing him in December 1950. Smith married Louis Prima July 13, 1953. in Virginia Beach. They had two children, Toni Elizabeth and Luanne Francis. Smith had affairs with Sam Giancana and Frank Sinatra prior to her divorce from Prima in 1961. She also had a relationship with Clint Eastwood. She married Jimmy Bowen in 1965. The couple divorced in 1969. In 1975, Smith married singer Bobby Milano (real name Charles Caci) in Palm Springs. Sinatra gave the bride away. Milano died in 2006.

On December 16, 2017, Smith died of apparent heart failure in Palm Springs, California, at the age of 89. She is buried at Forest Lawn Memorial Park, Hollywood Hills.

== Legacy ==
In 1998, a Golden Palm Star on the Palm Springs Walk of Stars was dedicated to her. She also has a star at 7080 Hollywood Boulevard in the Recording section of the Hollywood Walk of Fame. It was dedicated on September 22, 1998.

== Discography ==
=== Solo albums ===
- 1957 I Wish You Love (Capitol)
- 1958 Politely! (Capitol)
- 1959 Swingin' Pretty (Capitol)
- 1959 Be My Love (Dot)
- 1960 Swing, You Lovers (Dot)
- 1960 A Keely Christmas (Dot)
- 1961 Twist with Keely Smith (Dot)
- 1961 Dearly Beloved (Dot)
- 1962 Because You're Mine (Dot)
- 1962 What Kind of Fool Am I? (Dot)
- 1962 Cherokeely Swings (Dot)
- 1963 Little Girl Blue/Little Girl New (Reprise)
- 1964 The Intimate Keely Smith (Reprise)
- 1964 Keely Smith Sings the John Lennon—Paul McCartney Songbook (Reprise)
- 1965 That Old Black Magic (Reprise)
- 1985 I'm in Love Again (Fantasy)
- 2000 Swing, Swing, Swing (Concord)
- 2001 Keely Sings Sinatra (Concord)
- 2002 Keely Swings Basie-Style With Strings (Concord)
- 2005 Vegas '58 – Today (Recorded Live At Feinstein's At The Regency) (Concord)

With Louis Prima

- 1958 Breaking It Up! (Columbia)
- 1959 Louis and Keely! (Dot)
- 1959 Louis Prima & Keely Smith on Broadway (Coronet)
- 1960 Louis Prima Digs Keely Smith (Coronet)
- 1960 Together (Dot)
- 1961 Return of the Wildest! (Dot)

With Louis Prima, Sam Butera & The Witnesses

- 1957 The Call of the Wildest (Capitol)
- 1957 The Wildest Show at Tahoe (Capitol)
- 1958 Las Vegas Prima Style (Capitol)
- 1959 Hey Boy! Hey Girl! (Capitol)
- 1960 On Stage (Dot)
