= Alice Cooper discography =

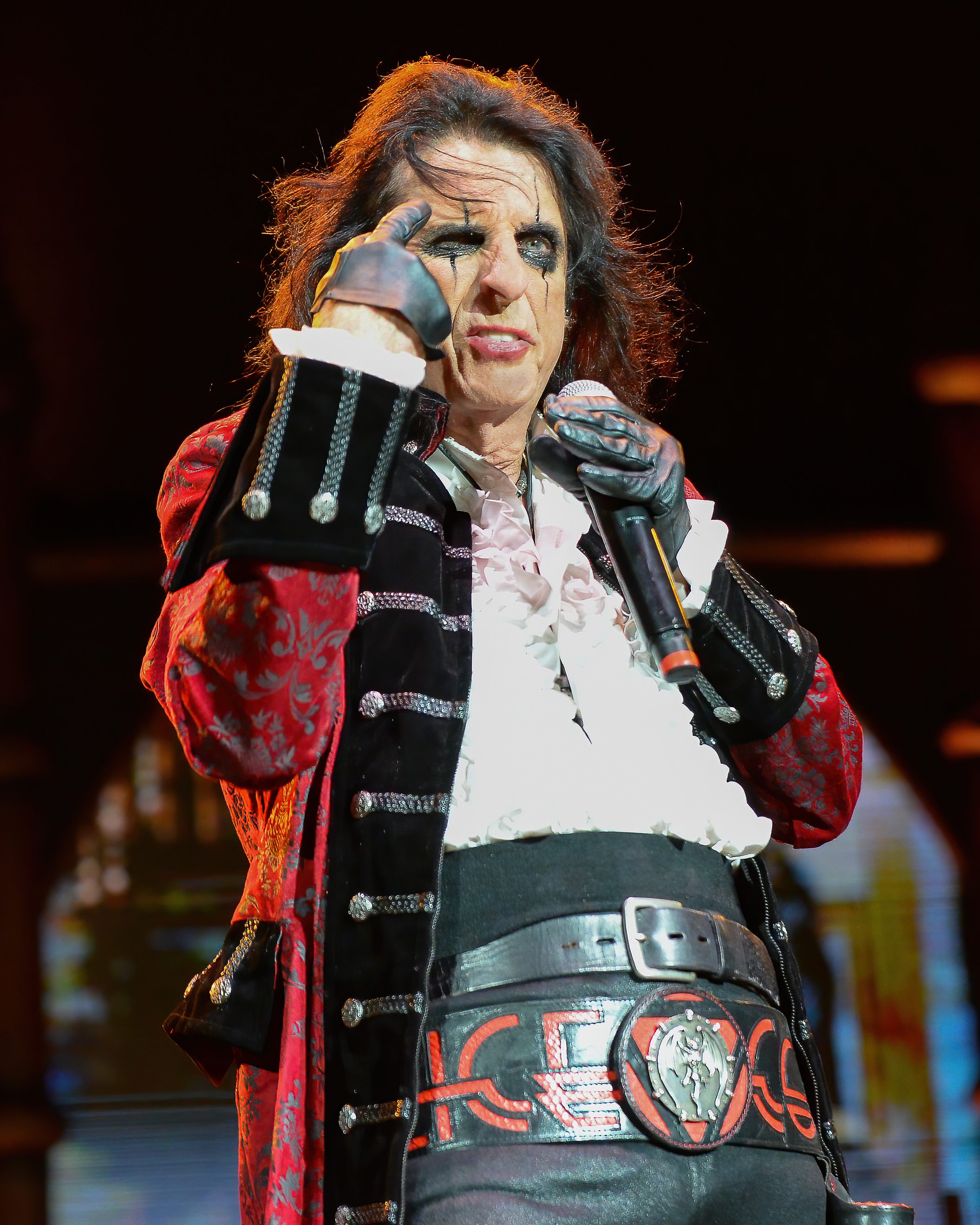
- Studio albums: 30
- Extended plays: 3
- Live albums: 12
- Compilation albums: 21
- Tribute albums: 2
- Singles: 69
- Video albums: 15
- Music videos: 33

This is the discography of American rock singer and songwriter Alice Cooper and the original band. It includes 30 studio albums (plus two studio albums with Hollywood Vampires), 69 singles, 3 extended plays, 12 live albums, 21 compilation albums, 15 video releases, 33 music videos and an audiobook (promo-only releases have been excluded here). Six of his studio albums have achieved platinum in the United States and three more have achieved gold. He has sold over 50 million records.

Cooper has released music under the record labels Straight, Warner Bros., Atlantic, MCA, Epic, Spitfire, Eagle, New West, and Bigger Picture.

== Albums ==
=== Studio albums ===
==== Band ====
Year	Album details	Peak chart positions										Certifications (sales thresholds)
Year	Album details	US	AUS	AUT	CAN	FIN	GER	NL	NOR	SWE	UK	Certifications (sales thresholds)
1969	Pretties for You: Released: June 25, 1969; Label: Straight	193	—	—	—	—	—	—	—	—	—	
1970	Easy Action: Released: March 27, 1970; Label: Straight, Enigma Retro	—	—	—	—	—	—	—	—	—	—	
1971	Love It to Death: Released: March 9, 1971; Label: Straight, Warner Bros.	35	—	—	39	—	—	—	—	—	28	RIAA: Platinum
1971	Killer: Released: November 9, 1971; Label: Warner Bros.	21	—	—	11	22	—	—	—	—	27	RIAA: Platinum
1972	School's Out: Released: June 13, 1972; Label: Warner Bros.	2	5	8	1	3	3	—	8	8	4	RIAA: Platinum; BPI: Silver
1973	Billion Dollar Babies: Released: February 27, 1973; Label: Warner Bros.	1	4	4	2	1	9	1	6	2	1	RIAA: Platinum; ARIA: Gold; MC: Gold
1973	Muscle of Love: Released: November 20, 1973; Label: Warner Bros.	10	36	—	4	13	—	—	—	4	34	RIAA: Gold
2025	The Revenge of Alice Cooper: Released: July 25, 2025; Label: earMusic	72	12	3	—	14	2	30	—	3	9	
"—" denotes albums that were released but did not chart, albums not released in a particular territory, or chart information is not available.

==== Solo career ====
Year	Album details	Peak chart positions														Certifications (sales thresholds)
Year	Album details	US	UK	AUS	AUT	NL	CAN	FIN	FRA	ITA	NZ	NOR	SWE	SWI	GER	Certifications (sales thresholds)
1975	Welcome to My Nightmare: Released: February 28, 1975; Label: Atlantic	5	19	5	—	—	2	23	—	—	24	—	—	—	—	RIAA: Platinum; ARIA: 2× Platinum; BPI: Silver; MC: 2× Platinum
1976	Alice Cooper Goes to Hell: Released: June 25, 1976; Label: Warner Bros.	27	23	4	—	—	23	—	—	—	—	—	47	—	—	RIAA: Gold; MC: Platinum
1977	Lace and Whiskey: Released: April 29, 1977; Label: Warner Bros.	42	33	3	—	—	27	—	—	—	32	—	43	—	—	ARIA: Platinum
1978	From the Inside: Released: November 17, 1978; Label: Warner Bros.	60	68	12	—	14	60	—	—	—	14	—	—	—	—	
1980	Flush the Fashion: Released: April 28, 1980; Label: Warner Bros.	44	56	32	—	—	19	—	—	—	40	32	34	—	—	MC: Gold
1981	Special Forces: Released: September 1, 1981; Label: Warner Bros.	125	96	76	—	—	—	—	—	—	—	—	—	—	—	
1982	Zipper Catches Skin: Released: August 25, 1982; Label: Warner Bros.	—	—	—	—	—	94	—	—	—	—	—	—	—	—	
1983	DaDa: Released: September 28, 1983; Label: Warner Bros.	—	93	—	—	—	—	—	—	—	—	—	—	—	—	
1986	Constrictor: Released: September 22, 1986; Label: MCA	59	41	94	—	—	—	21	—	—	—	—	17	—	—	MC: Gold
1987	Raise Your Fist and Yell: Released: September 5, 1987; Label: MCA	73	48	—	—	—	66	36	—	—	—	—	15	—	—	MC: Gold
1989	Trash: Released: July 25, 1989; Label: Epic	20	2	5	4	53	19	1	—	—	6	4	6	10	16	RIAA: Platinum; ARIA: Platinum; BVMI: Gold; IFPI AUT: Gold; IFPI FIN: Platinum; SWI: Gold; MC: Platinum
1991	Hey Stoopid: Released: July 2, 1991; Label: Epic	47	4	15	5	54	23	3	—	—	22	6	9	7	7	RIAA: Gold; BPI: Silver; MC: Platinum
1994	The Last Temptation: Released: July 12, 1994; Label: Epic	68	6	15	24	73	70	7	—	—	—	20	19	13	18	
2000	Brutal Planet: Released: June 6, 2000; Label: Spitfire	193	38	—	49	—	—	—	—	—	—	—	31	66	23	
2001	Dragontown: Released: September 18, 2001; Label: Spitfire	197	87	182	75	—	—	—	142	—	—	—	41	98	54	
2003	The Eyes of Alice Cooper: Released: September 23, 2003; Label: Eagle	184	112	—	72	—	—	40	—	—	—	—	59	—	78	
2005	Dirty Diamonds: Released: July 4, 2005 (Europe/UK) - August 2, 2005 (US); Label: Eagle Rock/Spitfire (UK), New West Records/RED/Sony BMG (US), Riot Distributors/Aztec Music (Australia)	169	89	—	66	88	—	—	159	—	—	—	40	—	71	
2008	Along Came a Spider: Released: July 29, 2008; Label: Steamhammer/SPV	53	31	147	37	76	19	31	101	—	—	33	25	37	26	
2011	Welcome 2 My Nightmare: Released: September 13, 2011; Label: UMe	22	—	16	25	—	25	17	73	60	23	23	19	49	26	
2017	Paranormal: Released: July 28, 2017; Label: earMUSIC	32	6	4	8	24	17	9	57	47	33	15	6	3	4	
2021	Detroit Stories: Released: February 26, 2021; Label: earMUSIC	47	4	3	3	51	56	6	37	39	—	22	7	3	1	
2023	Road: Released: August 25, 2023; Label: earMUSIC	160	8	19	3	49	—	17	—	—	—	39	24	6	2	
"—" denotes albums that were released but did not chart, albums not released in a particular territory, or chart information is not available.

=== Live albums ===
Year	Album details	Peak chart positions		Certifications (sales thresholds)
Year	Album details	US	AUS	Certifications (sales thresholds)
1977	The Alice Cooper Show: Recorded: 1977; Released: December 1977; Label: Warner Bros.	131	29	
1982	Toronto Rock 'n' Roll Revival 1969, Volume IV: Recorded: 1969; Released: 1982; Label: Accord	—	—	
1992	Live at the Whiskey a Go-Go, 1969: Recorded: 1968; Released: 1992; Label: Straight	—	—	
1997	A Fistful of Alice (re-released with the title Live at Cabo Wabo '96 in 2005): Recorded: 1996; Released: July 29, 1997; Label: Angel	—	71	
2000	Brutally Live: Recorded: 2000; Released: December 5, 2000; Label: Eagle Vision	—	—	MC: Gold
2006	Live at Montreux 2005: Recorded: 2005; Released: May 2006; Label: Eagle Vision	—	—	
2007	Extended Versions Live: Recorded: 1989; Released: 2007; Label: Sony	—	—	
2010	Theatre of Death: Live at Hammersmith 2009: Recorded: 2009; Released: September 2010; Label: Bigger Picture	—	—	
2012	No More Mr. Nice Guy: Live: Recorded: October 29, 2011, at London's Alexandra Place; Released: April 10, 2012; Label: Four Worlds	—	—	
2014	Raise the Dead: Live from Wacken: Recorded: August 3, 2013; Released: October 22, 2014; Label: UDR Music	—	—	
2018	A Paranormal Evening at the Olympia Paris: Recorded: December 7, 2017; Released: August 31, 2018; Label: earMUSIC	—	49	
2018	Live from the Astroturf: Recorded: October 6, 2015; Released: November 23, 2018; Label: Good	—	—	
"—" denotes albums that were released but did not chart, albums not released in a particular territory, or chart information is not available.

=== Compilations ===
Year	Album details	Peak chart positions				Certifications (sales thresholds)
Year	Album details	US	AUS	GER	UK	Certifications (sales thresholds)
1973	School Days: The Early Recordings: Released: 1973; Label: Warner Bros.	—	—	46	13	
1974	Alice Cooper's Greatest Hits: Released: 9 August 1974; Label: Warner Bros.	8	71	—	—	RIAA: Platinum; MC: 3× Platinum
1985	To Hell and Back: Alice Cooper's Greatest Hits: Released: 1985; Label: Warner Bros.	—	54	—	—	
1989	Prince of Darkness: Released: 1989; Label: MCA	—	—	—	—	
1989	The Beast of Alice Cooper: Released: 1989; Label: Wea International	—	60	—	—	ARIA: Gold; BPI: Silver
1995	Classicks: Released: September 5, 1995; Label: Epic	—	133	71	—	
1997	A Nice Nightmare: Released: 1997; Label: Angel	—	—	—	—	
1998	Freedom for Frankenstein: Hits & Pieces 1984-1991: Released: May 19, 1998; Label: Raven	—	—	—	—	
1999	Super Hits: Released: May 4, 1999; Label: Epic	—	—	—	15	
1999	The Life and Crimes of Alice Cooper (4-CD Box Set): Released: April 20, 1999; Label: Rhino	—	—	—	—	
2001	Mascara and Monsters: The Best of Alice Cooper: Released: 2001; Label: Rhino	—	—	—	—	
2001	The Definitive Alice Cooper: Released: 2001; Label: Rhino	—	60	—	33	ARIA: Gold; BPI: Gold
2002	The Essentials: Alice Cooper: Released: 2002; Label: Warner Bros.	—	—	—	—	
2002	Hell Is: Released: 2002; Label: Sony UK	—	—	—	—	
2003	He's Back: Released: 2003	—	—	—	—	
2003	Poison: Released: March 2003; Label: Eagle	—	—	—	—	
2004	School's Out and Other Hits: Released: September 14, 2004; Label: Rhino	—	—	—	—	
2005	Collections: Released: 2005; Label: Sony-BMG	—	—	—	—	
2007	Pick Up the Bones: Released: 2007; Label: Snapper	—	—	—	—	
2007	The Best of Alice Cooper: Released: 2007; Label: Sony-BMG	—	—	—	—	
2009	Poison: The Best of Alice Cooper: Released: 2009; Label: Steamhammer	—	—	—	—	
2011	Old School: 1964–1974 (4-CD, 1-DVD, & 2-Vinyl Box Set): Released: June 7, 2011; Label: Bigger Picture	—	—	—	—	
"—" denotes albums that were released but did not chart, albums not released in a particular territory, or chart information is not available.

== Extended plays (EP) ==
- Four Tracks from Alice Cooper's 'Welcome to My Nightmare, Department of Youth, Black Widow, Only Women Bleed' (12" EP, Part of the '+Four 99p' series, Anchor ANE-12001, 1977)
- Alice Does Alice (August 3, 2010)
- Breadcrumbs (September 13, 2019)

== Singles ==
The Spiders: "Why Don't You Love Me / Hitch Hike" (Mascot M-112) 1965

The Spiders: "Don't Blow Your Mind / No Price Tag" (Santa Cruz 10.003) 1966

Nazz: "Wonder Who's Loving Her Now? / Lay Down And Die, Goodbye" (Very Record S-001) 1967

=== With the Alice Cooper Group ===
Year	Title	Peak chart positions										B-side	Album
Year	Title	US	UK	CAN	AUS	AUT	NOR	SWE	NL	IRE	GER	B-side	Album
1969	"Reflected"	—	—	—	—	—	—	—	—	—	—	"Living"	Pretties for You
1970	"Shoe Salesman"	—	—	—	—	—	—	—	—	—	—	"Return of the Spiders"	Easy Action
1970	"I'm Eighteen"	21	—	7	—	—	—	—	—	—	—	"Body (Is It My Body?)"	Love It to Death
1971	"Caught in a Dream"	94	—	—	—	—	—	—	—	—	—	"Hallowed Be My Name"	Love It to Death
1971	"Under My Wheels"	59	66	—	—	—	—	—	—	—	—	"Desperado"	Killer
1972	"Be My Lover"	49	—	—	—	—	—	—	—	—	—	"Yeah, Yeah, Yeah"	Killer
1972	"School's Out"	7	1	3	39	12	6	—	9	2	5	"Gutter Cat"	School's Out
1972	"Elected"	26	4	—	83	3	—	—	5	8	3	"Luney Tune"	Billion Dollar Babies
1973	"Hello Hooray"	35	6	—	95	16	—	—	6	14	13	"Generation Landslide"	Billion Dollar Babies
1973	"No More Mr. Nice Guy"	25	10	—	—	14	—	—	6	18	10	"Raped and Freezin'"	Billion Dollar Babies
1973	"Billion Dollar Babies"	57	—	—	—	—	—	—	—	—	30	"Mary Ann"	Billion Dollar Babies
1973	"Halo of Flies"	—	—	—	—	—	—	—	5	—	—	"Under My Wheels"	Killer
1973	"Teenage Lament '74"	48	12	—	89	—	—	—	—	16	43	"Hard Hearted Alice"	Muscle of Love
1974	"Muscle of Love"	107*	—	—	—	—	—	—	—	—	—	"Crazy Little Child"	Muscle of Love
1974	"I'm Eighteen" (remix)	—	—	—	—	—	—	—	—	—	—	"Muscle of Love"	Alice Cooper's Greatest Hits
2016	Live from the Astroturf	—	—	—	—	—	—	—	—	—	—	A-Side: Eighteen (live); B-Side: Body (live)	non-album
2025	"Black Mamba"	—	—	—	—	—	—	—	—	—	—		The Revenge of Alice Cooper
2025	"Wild Ones"	—	—	—	—	—	—	—	—	—	—		The Revenge of Alice Cooper
2025	"Up All Night"	—	—	—	—	—	—	—	—	—	—		The Revenge of Alice Cooper
"—" denotes releases that were released but did not chart, albums not released in a particular territory, or chart information is not available. US charts are Billboard unless otherwise noted. * Record World Singles Chart.

=== Solo career ===
Year	Title	Peak chart positions										B-side	Certifications	Album
Year	Title	US	UK	CAN	AUS	NOR	SWE	NZ	NL	IRE	GER	B-side	Certifications	Album
1975	"Only Women Bleed"	12	—	1	50	—	—	21	—	—	—	"Cold Ethyl"		Welcome to My Nightmare
1975	"Department of Youth"	67	—	—	7	—	—	—	—	—	—	"Some Folks"		Welcome to My Nightmare
1975	"Welcome to My Nightmare"	45	—	—	—	—	—	—	—	—	—	"Cold Ethyl"		Welcome to My Nightmare
1976	"I Never Cry"	12	—	5	23	—	—	—	—	—	—	"Go to Hell"	RIAA: Gold	Alice Cooper Goes to Hell
1977	"You and Me"	9	—	3	2	—	—	21	—	—	—	"It's Hot Tonight"		Lace and Whiskey
1977	"(No More) Love at Your Convenience"	—	44	—	54	—	—	—	—	—	—	"I Never Wrote Those Songs"		Lace and Whiskey
1977	"School's Out" (live)	—	—	—	—	—	—	—	—	—	—	"School's Out"		The Alice Cooper Show
1978	"How You Gonna See Me Now"	12	61	12	9	—	—	19	9	—	—	"No Tricks"		From the Inside
1979	"From the Inside"	—	—	—	—	—	—	—	—	—	—	"Nurse Rozetta"		From the Inside
1980	"Clones (We're All)"	40	—	25	36	—	—	—	—	—	58	"Model Citizen"		Flush the Fashion
1980	"Talk Talk"	—	—	—	—	—	—	—	—	—	—	"Dance Yourself to Death"		Flush the Fashion
1981	"You Want It, You Got It"	111*	—	—	74	—	—	—	—	—	—	"Who Do You Think We Are"		Special Forces
1982	"Seven and Seven Is"	—	62	—	—	—	—	—	—	—	—	"Generation Landslide '81" (live)		Special Forces
1982	"For Britain Only"	—	66	—	—	—	—	—	—	—	—			non-album
1982	"I Like Girls"	—	—	—	—	—	—	—	—	—	—	"Zorro's Ascent"		Zipper Catches Skin
1982	"I Am the Future"	—	—	—	—	—	—	—	—	—	—	"Tag, You're It"		Zipper Catches Skin
1983	"I Love America"	—	—	—	—	—	—	—	—	—	—			DaDa
1986	"He's Back (The Man Behind the Mask)"	—	61	—	—	—	4	—	—	—	—			Constrictor
1987	"Teenage Frankenstein"	—	80	—	—	—	—	—	—	—	—			Constrictor
1987	"Freedom"	—	50	—	—	—	—	—	—	—	—	"Time to Kill"		Raise Your Fist and Yell
1989	"Poison"	7	2	39	3	3	10	2	8	3	25	"Trash"	RIAA: Gold; BPI: Platinum	Trash
1989	"Bed of Nails"	—	38	—	13	—	18	27	—	24	—	"I'm Your Gun"		Trash
1989	"House of Fire"	56	65	—	80	—	—	—	—	—	—	"Poison" (live)		Trash
1990	"Only My Heart Talkin'"	89	—	—	47	—	—	—	—	—	—	"Only Women Bleed" (live)		Trash
1991	"Hey Stoopid"	78	21	—	32	5	19	17	22	—	—	"It Rained All Night"		Hey Stoopid
1991	"Love's a Loaded Gun"	—	38	—	125	—	—	—	—	—	—	"Fire"		Hey Stoopid
1992	"Feed My Frankenstein"	—	27	—	169	—	—	—	—	—	—	"Burning Our Bed"		Hey Stoopid
1994	"Lost in America"	—	22	—	65	—	—	46	—	—	—	"Hey Stoopid" (live)		The Last Temptation
1994	"It's Me"	—	34	—	77	—	—	—	—	—	—	"Bad Place Alone"		The Last Temptation
1997	"School's Out" (live)	—	—	—	—	—	—	—	—	—	—	"Elected"		A Fistful of Alice
2000	"Brutal Planet" (Promo only)	—	—	—	—	—	—	—	—	—	—			Brutal Planet
2000	"Gimme"	—	85	—	—	—	—	—	—	—	—	"Brutal Planet"		Brutal Planet
2000	"Blow Me a Kiss"	—	—	—	—	—	—	—	—	—	—			Brutal Planet
2000	"It's the Little Things" (Promo only)	—	—	—	—	—	—	—	—	—	—			Brutal Planet
2009	"Keepin' Halloween Alive"	—	—	—	—	—	—	—	—	—	—	LP: "I Love the Dead" (live) CD, DI: "Keepin' Halloween Alive (Cooperoke Mix)"		non-album
2011	"I'll Bite Your Face Off"	—	—	—	—	—	—	—	—	—	—	"I'll Bite Your Face Off" (live)		Welcome 2 My Nightmare
2011	"Caffeine"	—	—	—	—	—	—	—	—	—	—			Welcome 2 My Nightmare
2017	"Paranoiac Personality"	—	—	—	—	—	—	—	—	—	—	"I'm Eighteen" (live)		Paranormal
2017	"Paranormal"	—	—	—	—	—	—	—	—	—	—			Paranormal
2018	"The Sound of A"	—	—	—	—	—	—	—	—	—	—	"The Black Widow" (live), "Public Animal #9" (live), "Is It My Body" (live), "Cold Ethyl" (live)		Paranormal
2020	"Hanging on by a Thread (Don't Give Up)"	—	—	—	—	—	—	—	—	—	—			Detroit Stories
2020	"Rock & Roll"	—	—	—	—	—	—	—	—	—	—			Detroit Stories
2020	"Our Love Will Change the World"	—	—	—	—	—	—	—	—	—	—			Detroit Stories
2021	"Social Debris"	—	—	—	—	—	—	—	—	—	—			Detroit Stories
2023	"I'm Alice"	—	—	—	—	—	—	—	—	—	—			Road
2023	"White Line Frankenstein" (featuring Tom Morello)	—	—	—	—	—	—	—	—	—	—			Road
2023	"Welcome to the Show"	—	—	—	—	—	—	—	—	—	—			Road
2023	"Dead Don't Dance"	—	—	—	—	—	—	—	—	—	—			Road
"—" denotes releases that were released but did not chart, albums not released in a particular territory, or chart information is not available. US Charts are Billboard unless otherwise noted. * Record World Singles Chart.

== DVD audio ==
- Billion Dollar Babies (Rhino, 2001)
- Welcome to My Nightmare (Rhino, 2001)

== Soundtracks ==
Year	Film
1971	Medicine Ball Caravan
1978	Sgt. Pepper's Lonely Hearts Club Band
1979	Rock 'n' Roll High School
1980	Roadie
1982	Class of 1984
1984	Monster Dog
1986	Friday the 13th Part VI: Jason Lives
1988	The Decline Of Western Civilization Part II (The Metal Years)
1988	Iron Eagle II
1992	Wayne's World
1993	Dazed and Confused
2007	Halloween
2012	Dark Shadows

== Other contributions ==
- "The Garden" by Guns N' Roses
- "Merry Arizona II: Desert Stars Shine at Christmas" (on "Is There a Santa?")
- "Intro" to "The Great Milenko" by Insane Clown Posse (1997 Island 524-442-2)
- "Flash Fearless Vs. the Zorg Women, Pts. 5 & 6" ("I'm Flash" and "Space Pirates")
- "Live at Wacken 2013" – includes live version of "Hey Stoopid" and "Billion Dollar Babies"
- "Savages" by Theory of a Deadman
- "The Toymaster" on The Scarecrow by Avantasia
- "Troubled Love" by Pushking
- "Hey Bulldog" on Butchering The Beatles
- "Eleanor Rigby" and "Smile Away" on The Art of McCartney
- "Shockdance" on Shocker Soundtrack - 1989 (as The Dudes of Wrath)
- "Two For The Road" and "Holy Man's War" (1989) by Icon
- "Be Chrool to Your Scuel" by Twisted Sister (1985)
- "Celebration Suite: Start Me Up, A Hard Day's Night, See Me, Feel Me/Listening to You", on CD British Rock Symphony
- "Baby Can't Drive" on Slash's self-titled solo album (2010)
- "Hallow's Grave" By Blue Coupe (2013)
- "Beginning of the End" on The New Normal by Kane Roberts (2019)
- "Heart Parade" by Splash'N Boots (2020)
- "Nobody Likes Us" (2012) (Reissue live album published by Easy Action independent label)
- "Kick Out the Jams" by Suzi Quatro (2026)

== Audiobook (CD) ==
- Alice Cooper: Golf Monster (Abridged) (Random House Audio, May 1, 2007)

4CD audio version of Cooper's autobiography, narrated by Cooper.

== Videography ==
=== Concert features and live footage ===
Year	Album details	Certifications
1974	Good to See You Again, Alice Cooper: Released: 1974; Label: Shout! Factory / Eagle Vision; Format:	
1975	Welcome to My Nightmare: Released: 1976; Label: Atlantic / Anchor; Format:	
1975	Alice Cooper: The Nightmare: Released: 1983; Label: Warner Home Video; Format:	
1977	Alice Cooper and Friends: Released: 1978; Label: Media Video; Format:	
1979	The Strange Case of Alice Cooper: Released: September 1979, May 2012; Label: Magnetic Video Corp. (1979), Shout! Factory (2012); Format: Betamax/VHS (1979), DVD (2012)	
1986	The Nightmare Returns: Released: 1987; Label: Geffen; Format:	
1989	Alice Cooper Trashes The World: Released: 1990; Label: CBS Music Video; Format:	US - Gold; CAN - Gold
1989	Video Trash: Released: 1989; Label: CBS Music Video; Format:	US - Gold
1991	Prime Cuts: The Alice Cooper Story: Released: 1991; Label: Sanctuary; Format:	
1999	British Rock Symphony: Released: 2000; Label: Format:	
2000	Brutally Live: Released: December 5, 2000; Label: Eagle Vision; Format:	AUS: Gold; CAN: Gold
2005	Live at Montreux 2005: Released: May 2006; Label: Eagle Vision; Format:	AUS: Gold
2009	Theatre of Death: Live at Hammersmith 2009: Released: September 2010; Label: Bigger Picture; Format:	AUS:: Gold
2014	Raise the Dead: Live from Wacken: Recorded: August 3, 2013; Released: October 22, 2014; Label: UDR Music; Format: Evidence:	

=== Others ===
Year	Album details	Certifications
1982	Alice Cooper a Paris: Released: Commercially unreleased; Production Company: Unknown	

=== Music videos ===
Year	Title	Album
1972	"School's Out"	School's Out
1972	"Elected"	Billion Dollar Babies
1973	"Hello Hooray"	Billion Dollar Babies
1973	"Teenage Lament '74"	Muscle of Love
1977	"You and Me"	Lace and Whiskey
1977	"(No More) Love at Your Convenience"	Lace and Whiskey
1978	"How You Gonna See Me Now"	From the Inside
1980	"Clones (We're All)"	Flush the Fashion
1980	"Pain"	Flush the Fashion
1981	"Seven and Seven Is"	Special Forces
1986	"He's Back (The Man Behind the Mask)"	Constrictor
1986	"Teenage Frankenstein"	Constrictor
1987	"Freedom"	Raise Your Fist and Yell
1988	"I Got a Line on You"	non-album
1989	"Poison" (2 versions)	Trash
1989	"Bed of Nails"	Trash
1989	"House of Fire"	Trash
1990	"Only My Heart Talkin'"	Trash
1991	"Hey Stoopid"	Hey Stoopid
1991	"Love's a Loaded Gun"	Hey Stoopid
1992	"Feed My Frankenstein"	Hey Stoopid
1994	"Lost in America"	The Last Temptation
1994	"It's Me"	The Last Temptation
2000	"Gimme"	Brutal Planet
2001	"It's the Little Things"	Brutal Planet
2008	"Along Came a Spider: The Movie" (with Slash) ● "Vengeance Is Mine" ● "(In Touch with) Your Feminine Side" ● "Killed by Love"	Along Came a Spider
2011	"I'll Bite Your Face Off"	Welcome 2 My Nightmare
2017	"The Sound of A"	Paranormal
2020	"Don't Give Up"	Detroit Stories
2021	"Social Debris"	Detroit Stories
2023	"Dead Don't Dance"	Road
2025	"Black Mamba"	The Revenge of Alice Cooper
2025	"Wild Ones"	The Revenge of Alice Cooper

== Tribute albums ==
Year	Film
1993	Welcome to Our Nightmare: A Tribute to Alice Cooper
1999	Humanary Stew: A Tribute to Alice Cooper
