= The Life and Crimes of Alice Cooper =

Box set by Alice Cooper
- Released: April 20, 1999
- Recorded: 1965–1997
- Genres: Hard rock; shock rock; glam rock; garage rock; psychedelic rock; new wave; heavy metal; glam metal
- Length: 4:54:19
- Label: Rhino

Alice Cooper chronology
A Fistful of Alice (1997)	The Life and Crimes of Alice Cooper (1999)	Brutal Planet (2000)

Professional ratings
Review scores
Source	Rating
AllMusic	4/5 stars
The Rolling Stone Album Guide	4/5 stars

The Life and Crimes of Alice Cooper is a 4-CD box set by American singer Alice Cooper, released on April 20, 1999, by Rhino Records. It includes select tracks from every studio album released until then, plus many B-sides, unreleased songs, and other rarities. It also includes Alice Cooper's authorized biography, Alcohol and Razor Blades, Poison and Needles: The Glorious Wretched Excess of Alice Cooper, All-American, written by Creem magazine editor Jeffrey Morgan.

== Track listing ==
Disc One
No.	Title	Original album	Length
1.	"Don't Blow Your Mind"	The Spiders (1966)	2:36
2.	"Hitch Hike"	The Spiders (1965)	2:01
3.	"Why Don't You Love Me"	The Spiders (1965)	1:57
4.	"Lay Down And Die, Goodbye" (Original Version)	The Nazz (1967)	2:07
5.	"Nobody Likes Me" (demo version, 1968)		3:23
6.	"Levity Ball" (studio version, 1968)		4:45
7.	"Reflected"	Pretties for You	3:14
8.	"Mr. and Misdemeanor"	Easy Action	3:00
9.	"Refrigerator Heaven"	Easy Action	1:54
10.	"Caught in a Dream" (single version)	Love It to Death	2:55
11.	"I'm Eighteen"	Love It to Death	2:58
12.	"Is It My Body?"	Love It to Death	2:39
13.	"Ballad of Dwight Fry"	Love It to Death	6:34
14.	"Under My Wheels"	Killer	2:47
15.	"Be My Lover"	Killer	3:21
16.	"Desperado"	Killer	3:29
17.	"Dead Babies"	Killer	5:42
18.	"Killer"	Killer	7:05
19.	"Call It Evil" (demo, 1971)		3:28
20.	"Gutter Cat vs. the Jets"	School's Out	4:39
21.	"School's Out" (single version, 1972)	School's Out	3:31

Disc Two
No.	Title	Original album	Length
1.	"Hello Hooray"	Billion Dollar Babies	4:15
2.	"Elected" (single version)	Billion Dollar Babies	3:43
3.	"Billion Dollar Babies"	Billion Dollar Babies	3:39
4.	"No More Mr. Nice Guy"	Billion Dollar Babies	3:07
5.	"I Love the Dead"	Billion Dollar Babies	5:07
6.	"Slick Black Limousine" (Flexi-disc from New Musical Express, 1973)		4:27
7.	"Respect for the Sleepers" (demo, 1973)		3:48
8.	"Muscle of Love"	Muscle of Love	3:45
9.	"Teenage Lament '74"	Muscle of Love	3:52
10.	"Working Up a Sweat"	Muscle of Love	3:31
11.	"Man with the Golden Gun"	Muscle of Love	3:13
12.	"I'm Flash"	Flash Fearless Vs. the Zorg Women, Pts. 5 & 6	2:47
13.	"Space Pirates"	Flash Fearless Vs. the Zorg Women, Pts. 5 & 6	3:30
14.	"Welcome to My Nightmare" (single version)	Welcome to My Nightmare	2:45
15.	"Only Women Bleed" (single version)	Welcome to My Nightmare	3:17
16.	"Cold Ethyl"	Welcome to My Nightmare	2:54
17.	"Department of Youth"	Welcome to My Nightmare	3:17
18.	"Escape"	Welcome to My Nightmare	3:14
19.	"I Never Cry"	Alice Cooper Goes to Hell	3:43
20.	"Go to Hell"	Alice Cooper Goes to Hell	5:11

Disc Three
No.	Title	Original album	Length
1.	"It's Hot Tonight"	Lace and Whiskey	3:21
2.	"You and Me" (single version)	Lace and Whiskey	3:25
3.	"I Miss You"	Billion Dollar Babies - Battle Axe	3:31
4.	"No Time for Tears"	Sextette film outtake	2:59
5.	"Because" (with The Bee Gees)	Sgt. Pepper's Lonely Hearts Club Band soundtrack	2:45
6.	"From the Inside" (single version)	From the Inside	3:30
7.	"How You Gonna See Me Now"	From the Inside	3:53
8.	"Serious"	From the Inside	2:41
9.	"No Tricks" (duet with Betty Wright)	“How You Gonna See Me Now” B-side	4:15
10.	"Road Rats" (originally released on Lace and Whiskey)	Roadie soundtrack	2:43
11.	"Clones (We're All)" (single version)	Flush the Fashion	2:51
12.	"Pain"	Flush the Fashion	4:10
13.	"Who Do You Think We Are" (single version)	Special Forces	3:05
14.	"Look at You Over There, Ripping the Sawdust from My Teddybear" (demo, 1981)		3:18
15.	"For Britain Only" (UK-only single, 1982)		3:02
16.	"I Am the Future" (single version)	Zipper Catches Skin	3:45
17.	"Tag, You're It"	Zipper Catches Skin	2:52
18.	"Former Lee Warmer"	DaDa	4:07
19.	"I Love America"	DaDa	3:47
20.	"Identity Crisis"	Monster Dog soundtrack	2:50
21.	"See Me in the Mirror"	Monster Dog soundtrack	3:12
22.	"Hard Rock Summer"	Friday the 13th Part VI: Jason Lives soundtrack	2:30

Disc Four
No.	Title	Original Album	Length
1.	"He's Back (The Man Behind the Mask)" (demo)		3:20
2.	"He's Back (The Man Behind the Mask)" (Movie Mix)	Friday the 13th Part VI: Jason Lives soundtrack	3:44
3.	"Teenage Frankenstein"	Constrictor	3:32
4.	"Freedom"	Raise Your Fist and Yell	4:04
5.	"Prince of Darkness"	Raise Your Fist and Yell	5:09
6.	"Under My Wheels"	The Decline of Western Civilization II soundtrack	3:10
7.	"I Got a Line on You"	Iron Eagle II soundtrack	2:59
8.	"Poison"	Trash	4:27
9.	"Trash"	Trash	3:58
10.	"Only My Heart Talkin'"	Trash	4:44
11.	"Hey Stoopid" (single version)	Hey Stoopid	4:15
12.	"Feed My Frankenstein"	Hey Stoopid	4:42
13.	"Fire"	“Love's a Loaded Gun” B-side	3:00
14.	"Lost in America"	The Last Temptation	3:54
15.	"It's Me"	The Last Temptation	4:40
16.	"Hands of Death" (Spookshow 2000 Mix with Rob Zombie)	Songs in the Key of X soundtrack	3:53
17.	"Is Anyone Home?"	A Fistful of Alice	4:10
18.	"Stolen Prayer"	The Last Temptation	5:35
