= He's Back (The Man Behind the Mask) =

- Single cover

Single by Alice Cooper

from the album Constrictor
- B-side: "Billion Dollar Babies (Live)
- Released: August 29, 1986
- Recorded: 1986
- Genre: Rock; hard rock; pop metal
- Length: 3:37
- Label: MCA Records
- Songwriters: Alice Cooper, Kane Roberts, Tom Kelly
- Producer: Alice Cooper

Alice Cooper singles chronology
"I Love America" (1983)	"He's Back (The Man Behind the Mask)" (1986)	"Teenage Frankenstein" (1987)

"He's Back (The Man Behind the Mask)" is a song by American rock musician Alice Cooper. It was released as the lead single from his 1986 album Constrictor and was used as the theme song for the motion picture Friday the 13th Part VI: Jason Lives.

The song features the famous "ki-ki-ki ma-ma-ma" (in its popular misheard version, "ch-ch-ch, ha-ha-ha") sound effect, a trademark of the Friday the 13th series. The song has also been described as celebrating the return of series antagonist Jason Voorhees, after being killed off in the fourth film Friday the 13th: The Final Chapter (1984) and appearing only in flashbacks and hallucinations in the fifth installment Friday the 13th: A New Beginning (1985).

"He's Back (The Man Behind the Mask)" was a minor chart success, popular among fans of Cooper's later work and enthusiasts of slasher films. It has been said to "perfectly encapsulate the Friday the 13th films and the era in which they came to prominence."

The 7" single featured a "live" version of "Billion Dollar Babies" as its B-side. The 12" single featured "Billion Dollar Babies (Recorded Live)" as well as a haunting "live" version of "I'm Eighteen". Both versions were in fact originally recorded in the studio for the Alice Cooper a Paris TV special in 1981 during the Special Forces era, which were remixed in 1986 with crowd noise to resemble "live" recordings.

== Other versions ==
A demo version of the song, with a slightly rockier and much more upbeat feel, as well as the final release version, were featured in the four-disc retrospective boxed set The Life and Crimes of Alice Cooper, which chronicles Cooper's career. The song was also available on a compilation album of songs from his two late-1980s MCA albums, Constrictor and Raise Your Fist and Yell, entitled Prince of Darkness.

The unused demo version instead became the song Trick Bag, also on the Constrictor album.

== Music video ==
The song is well known for its music video, which combines clips from Jason Lives with original footage featuring Cooper performing the song and Jason Voorhees played, as he is in the film, by C. J. Graham menacing teenagers at a midnight showing of Jason Lives. It was directed by Jeffrey Abelson from a concept by Keith Williams. Some of the film footage features the Paintball scene where Jason was played by Dan Bradley, which was filmed before he was replaced by Graham. This video was not present on any home media release until 2020 when Shout Factory's line Scream Factory released it as a bonus feature on their Friday the 13th deluxe box set.

== Track listing ==
7" single
No.	Title	Length
1.	"He's Back (The Man Behind the Mask)"	3:23
2.	"Billion Dollar Babes" (Live)	3:23

12" single
No.	Title	Length
1.	"He's Back (The Man Behind the Mask)"	3:23
2.	"Billion Dollar Babies" (Live)	3:23
3.	"I'm Eighteen" (Live)	4:32

== Charts ==
Chart (1986)	Peak position
Sweden (Sverigetopplistan)	4
UK Singles (OCC)	61

== Cover versions ==
The song has been covered by some other artists. Finnish metal band Children of Bodom recorded a version in 2002, but was never released, and "He's Back" has been performed live by another Finnish metal band, Lordi. In addition, the song was covered by One Man Army and the Undead Quartet, which was released on the Swedish death metal group's 2007 album Error in Evolution. Synthpop artist Digital Love released a version for Halloween 2022.
