= Teenage Frankenstein =

Song by Alice Cooper

Single by Alice Cooper

from the album Constrictor
- B-side: "School's Out" (Live)
- Released: March 1987
- Recorded: 1986
- Genre: Pop metal
- Length: 3:36
- Label: MCA Records
- Songwriter(s): Alice Cooper, Kane Roberts
- Producer(s): Alice Cooper

Alice Cooper singles chronology
"He's Back (The Man Behind the Mask)" (1986)	"Teenage Frankenstein" (1987)	"Freedom" (1987)

"Teenage Frankenstein" is the second single by American musician Alice Cooper from his 1986 album Constrictor. Though the single failed to chart in the United States, it helped to make Constrictor Cooper's highest-charting album since 1980's Flush the Fashion. It peaked at number 80 on the UK singles Chart in 1987.

Along with two other Alice Cooper songs, "He's Back (The Man Behind the Mask)" and "Hard Rock Summer" (which was not featured on "Constrictor"), "Teenage Frankenstein" was written to be featured as part of the soundtrack to the horror film Friday the 13th Part VI: Jason Lives.

The 7" single featured a "live" version of "School's Out" as its B-side. The 12" single featured "School's Out (Recorded Live)" as well as a "live" version of "Only Women Bleed". Both versions were in fact originally recorded in the studio for the Alice Cooper a Paris TV special in 1982 during the Special Forces era, which were remixed in January 1987 with crowd noise to resemble "live" recordings.

The song was written by Alice Cooper and Kane Roberts.

== Music video ==
A music video of Cooper performing the song live in concert was used to promote the single. This is footage of a compilation of material from The Nightmare Returns concert video.

== Track listing ==
7" vinyl
No.	Title	Length
1.	"Teenage Frankenstein"	3:37
2.	"School's Out" (Live Paris June 1981)	3:00

12" vinyl
No.	Title	Length
1.	"Teenage Frankenstein"	3:37
2.	"School's Out" (Live)	3:01
3.	"Only Women Bleed" (Live)	2:58

== Album appearances ==
- Constrictor - 1986
- Prince of Darkness - 1989
- The Life and Crimes of Alice Cooper - 1999
