= The Nightmare Returns =

Video by Alice Cooper
- Released: 1987 VHS Betamax; Aug 1, 2006 DVD
- Recorded: 1986
- Genre: Hard rock, Heavy metal, Shock rock
- Label: Geffen Records

Alice Cooper chronology
The Strange Case of Alice Cooper (1979)	The Nightmare Returns (1987)	Video Trash (1989)

The Nightmare Returns is a live concert video of Alice Cooper. The concert was filmed live in Detroit, Michigan, USA on Halloween 1986 at the start of his "The Nightmare Returns" World Tour, in support of his album Constrictor. This video was originally released in 1987 on VHS and Betamax, and was released on DVD in 2006. The music video for "Teenage Frankenstein" consists of footage from this concert.

== Track listing ==
1. "Welcome to My Nightmare"
2. "Billion Dollar Babies"
3. "No More Mr. Nice Guy"
4. "Be My Lover"
5. "18 (Little Flower of Ulysses)"
6. "The World Needs Guts"
7. "Give It Up"
8. "Cold Ethyl"
9. "Only Women Bleed"
10. "Go to Hell"
11. "The Ballad of Dwight Fry"
12. "Teenage Frankenstein"
13. "Sick Things"
14. "I Love The Dead"
15. "School's Out"
16. "Elected"
17. "Under My Wheels"

== Bonus music videos ==
1. "Teenage Frankenstein"
2. "Freedom"

== Personnel ==
- Alice Cooper - vocals
- Kane Roberts - lead guitar
- Devlin 7 - rhythm guitar
- Kip Winger - bass (credited as "Kip Winger III")
- Ken Mary - drums
- Paul Horowitz - keyboards

== Reception ==
Professional ratings
Review scores
Source	Rating
Allmusic	3/5 stars
