= C. J. Graham =

American actor (born 1956/57)

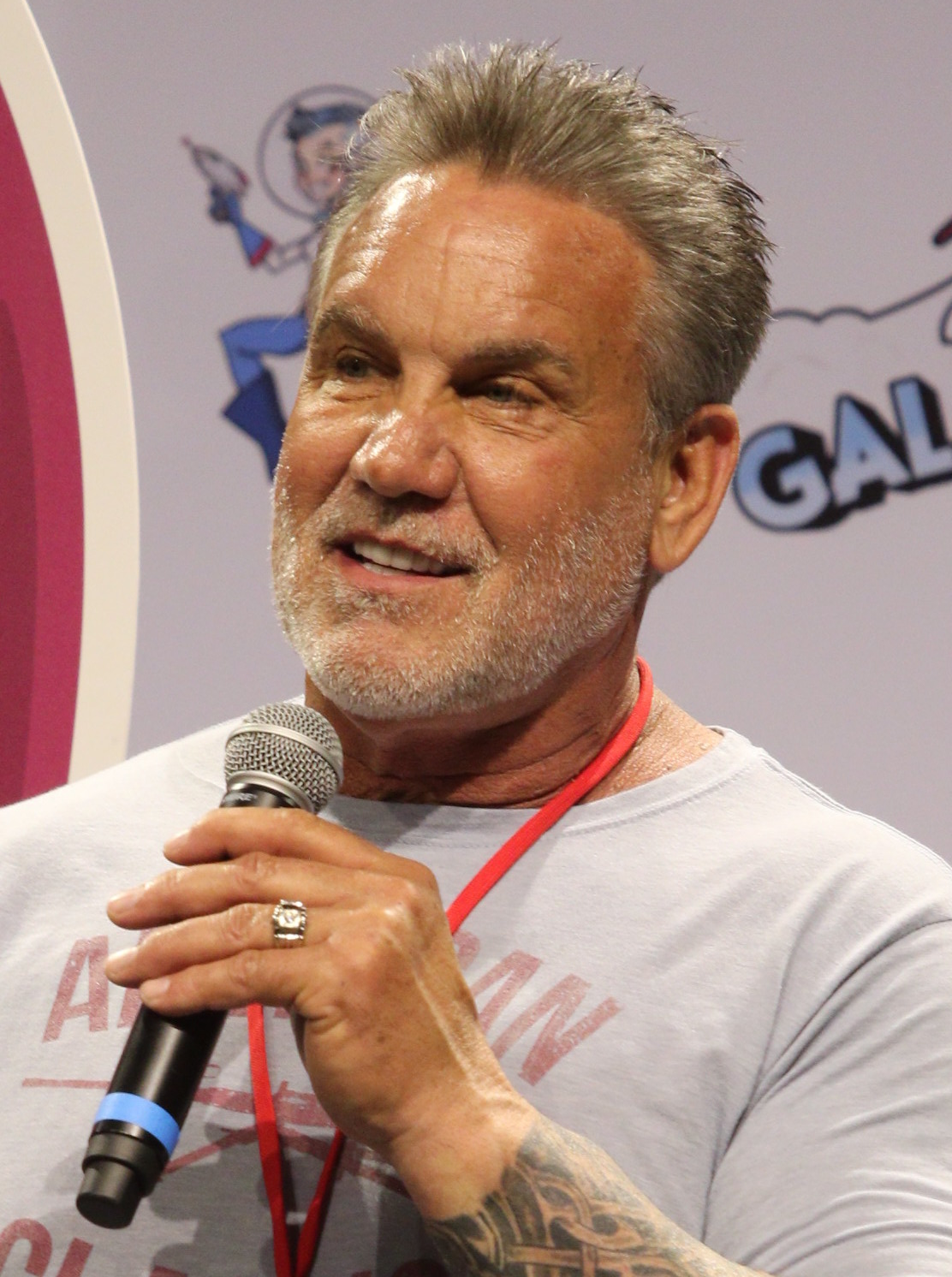
- Graham at GalaxyCon Richmond in 2019
- Born: 1956 or 1957 (age 69–70); Seattle, Washington, U.S.
- Years active: 1986–present
- Known for: Playing Jason Voorhees

C. J. Graham is an American actor best known for playing Jason Voorhees in the sixth installment of the Friday the 13th film series, Friday the 13th Part VI: Jason Lives (1986).

== Early life and career ==
Graham was born in Seattle, Washington. He served in the U.S. Army from 1974 to 1978, near the end of the Vietnam War.

A 6'3" former nightclub owner, Graham was spotted as a potential Jason Voorhees for Friday the 13th Part VI: Jason Lives when playing Jason in a night club act. Impressing those casting for the film, who were already in search of a new Jason as then actor Dan Bradley was considered not imposing or threatening enough, C. J. Graham landed the role. He went on to play Jason in all movie scenes and stunts besides the Paintball scene which had already been filmed with Bradley and the opening graveyard scene which was played by Christopher Swift. Graham reprised this role in the video for Alice Cooper's "He's Back (The Man Behind the Mask)", which was written for and featured in the film blending footage straight from the movie as well as original footage.

As of 2017, Graham only played one other role – he appeared in the horror film Highway to Hell as the main antagonist, a heavily made-up, silent monster called the Hell Cop. As of 2010, Graham is the VP of casino operations at Thunder Valley Casino in Lincoln, California. This is similar to Heather Langenkamp (of A Nightmare on Elm Street fame) and Richard Brooker (of Friday the 13th Part III fame), who are both full-time business owners and part-time actors. He has been known to speak highly of his time as Jason, even claiming that he would reprise the role in another film if asked.

Graham was formerly the COO of the Agua Caliente Casinos in the greater Palm Springs area, California.

According to an online interview with Kane Hodder, the actor who played Jason directly after Graham, reported that Graham had the chance to reprise the role of Jason in the long-awaited 2003 film Freddy vs. Jason. With the producers of the film looking to replace Hodder despite being cast in the four most recent movies, citing supposed reasons ranging from his height compared to Robert Englund, the actor who portrayed Freddy Krueger, to simply wanting to try something different, Graham's name was brought up in suggestion. Despite Graham's agent wanting him to audition for the role, Graham, being both a good friend of Hodder and feeling like the New Line producers were treating him unfairly with the re-casting decision, wanted no part in it. Ultimately, the role went to Canadian stuntman Ken Kirzinger.

Graham commonly visits horror conventions and often participants in fan events and signing autographs.

== Filmography ==
- Friday the 13th Part VI: Jason Lives (1986) as Jason Voorhees (All scenes except the "Paintball Scene")
- He's Back (The Man Behind the Mask) (1986) as Jason Voorhees (Archive footage from "Jason Lives" and some new footage)
- Highway to Hell (1992) as Sergeant Bedlam, Hellcop
- His Name Was Jason: 30 Years of Friday the 13th (2009) (Documentary film) as Himself
- Crystal Lake Memories: The Complete History of Friday the 13th (2013) (Documentary film) as Himself
- 13 Fanboy (2021) as Himself
