= A Fistful of Alice =

Live album by Alice Cooper
- Released: July 29, 1997
- Recorded: June 2, 1996
- Venue: Cabo Wabo Cantina, Cabo San Lucas, Mexico
- Genre: Hard rock; glam rock
- Length: 58:16
- Label: Angel
- Producer: Alice Cooper

Alice Cooper chronology
Classicks (1995)	A Fistful of Alice (1997)	The Life and Crimes of Alice Cooper (1999)

Professional ratings
Review scores
Source	Rating
AllMusic	link

A Fistful of Alice is a live album by American hard rock singer Alice Cooper. It was released on July 29, 1997, and was recorded the previous year at Sammy Hagar's Cabo Wabo club in Cabo San Lucas, Mexico. Slash plays guitar for part of the album (returning the favor after Cooper guested on "The Garden" from the 1991 Guns N' Roses album Use Your Illusion I) and Cooper says before the song "Desperado" that it was written about Jim Morrison, who died in 1971, the same year Cooper wrote the song. Also featured in the album are Rob Zombie on vocals and Sammy Hagar on guitar. The only song from the show that has not been commercially released is the title track from 1991's Hey Stoopid. The last song, "Is Anyone Home?", is a studio recording recorded specifically for the album.

Live At Cabo Wabo '96 is a 2005 re-packaged release of A Fistful of Alice, using the UK track listing (see below).

== Track listing ==
=== US Track Listing ===
No.	Title	Writer(s)	Length
1.	"School's Out" (featuring Sammy Hagar)	Alice Cooper, Michael Bruce, Glen Buxton, Dennis Dunaway, Neal Smith	4:21
2.	"I'm Eighteen"	Alice Cooper, Michael Bruce, Glen Buxton, Dennis Dunaway, Neal Smith	3:47
3.	"Desperado"	Alice Cooper, Michael Bruce	4:10
4.	"Lost in America" (featuring Slash)	Alice Cooper, Dan Wexler, Bud Saylor	4:14
5.	"Teenage Lament '74"	Alice Cooper, Neal Smith	3:28
6.	"I Never Cry"	Alice Cooper, Dick Wagner	3:53
7.	"Poison"	Alice Cooper, Desmond Child, John McCurry	4:50
8.	"Billion Dollar Babies"	Alice Cooper, Michael Bruce, Neal Smith, Reggie Vinson	3:21
9.	"Welcome to My Nightmare"	Alice Cooper, Dick Wagner	4:59
10.	"Only Women Bleed" (featuring Slash)	Alice Cooper, Dick Wagner	6:54
11.	"Feed My Frankenstein" (featuring Rob Zombie)	Alice Cooper, Zodiac Mindwarp, Nick Coler, Ian Richardson	4:29
12.	"Elected" (featuring Rob Zombie and Slash)	Alice Cooper, Michael Bruce, Glen Buxton, Dennis Dunaway, Neal Smith	5:00
13.	"Is Anyone Home?"	Alice Cooper, Dan Wexler	4:21

=== UK Track Listing ===
No.	Title	Length
1.	"School's Out" (featuring Sammy Hagar)	4:21
2.	"Under My Wheels" (Michael Bruce, Dennis Dunaway, Bob Ezrin)	3:29
3.	"I'm Eighteen"	3:47
4.	"Desperado"	4:10
5.	"Lost in America" (featuring Slash)	4:14
6.	"Teenage Lament '74"	3:28
7.	"I Never Cry"	3:53
8.	"Poison"	4:50
9.	"No More Mr. Nice Guy" (Alice Cooper, Michael Bruce)	3:01
10.	"Welcome to My Nightmare"	4:59
11.	"Only Women Bleed" (featuring Slash)	6:48
12.	"Feed My Frankenstein" (featuring Rob Zombie)	4:29
13.	"Elected" (featuring Rob Zombie and Slash)	5:00
14.	"Is Anyone Home?"	4:21

=== Japanese Track Listing ===
No.	Title	Length
1.	"School's Out" (featuring Sammy Hagar)	4:21
2.	"Under My Wheels"	3:29
3.	"I'm Eighteen"	3:47
4.	"Desperado"	4:10
5.	"Lost in America" (featuring Slash)	4:14
6.	"Teenage Lament '74"	3:28
7.	"I Never Cry"	3:53
8.	"Poison"	4:50
9.	"Bed of Nails" (Alice Cooper, Desmond Child, Diane Warren)	3:48
10.	"Clones" (David Carron)	3:00
11.	"No More Mr. Nice Guy"	3:01
12.	"Billion Dollar Babies"	3:21
13.	"Welcome to My Nightmare"	4:59
14.	"Only Women Bleed" (featuring Slash)	6:48
15.	"Feed My Frankenstein" (featuring Rob Zombie)	4:29
16.	"Elected" (featuring Rob Zombie & Slash)	5:00
17.	"Is Anyone Home?"	4:21

=== Australian Track Listing ===
No.	Title	Length
1.	"School's Out" (featuring Sammy Hagar)	4:21
2.	"Under My Wheels"	3:29
3.	"I'm Eighteen"	3:47
4.	"Desperado"	4:10
5.	"Lost in America" (featuring Slash)	4:14
6.	"Teenage Lament '74"	3:28
7.	"I Never Cry"	3:53
8.	"Poison"	4:50
9.	"No More Mr. Nice Guy"	3:01
10.	"Bed of Nails" (imported UK versions contain Welcome to My Nightmare here)	3:48
11.	"Only Women Bleed" (featuring Slash)	6:48
12.	"Feed My Frankenstein" (featuring Rob Zombie)	4:29
13.	"Elected" (featuring Rob Zombie and Slash)	5:00
14.	"Is Anyone Home?"	4:21

== Personnel ==
- Alice Cooper – lead vocals
- Reb Beach – guitar
- Ryan Roxie – guitar
- Todd Jensen – bass guitar
- Paul Taylor – keyboards, guitar
- Jimmy DeGrasso – drums

Additional personnel

- Sammy Hagar – guitar
- Slash – lead guitar
- Rob Zombie – lead vocals
