= Jennifer Cooke =

American actress

- Born: September 19, 1964 (age 61)
- Occupation: Actress
- Years active: 1978–1986
- Spouse: Mo Siegel (1989–present)
- Children: 2

Jennifer Catherine Cooke (born September 19, 1964) is a former American actress. She is best known for her roles as Elizabeth Maxwell on the NBC science fiction television series V (1984–85) and as Megan Garris in the slasher film Friday the 13th Part VI: Jason Lives (1986).

== Early life and career ==
Cooke is the eldest of two children born to Robert and Kathleen Cooke of East Setauket, New York, where she attended Gelinas Junior High School and Ward Melville High School, graduating in 1982.

Cooke is perhaps best known for her role as the "Star Child", Elizabeth Maxwell, who is half Human/half Visitor in the 1984 television series V. She also starred in the soap opera Guiding Light as Morgan Richards Nelson from 1981 to 1983. Cooke played Debbie Nesbit on the NBC miniseries A Year in the Life. Her most well-known film role is in the 1986 horror film Friday the 13th Part VI: Jason Lives as Megan Garris. Cooke also made a guest appearance on TV is on the HBO series The Hitchhiker.

After appearing in Friday the 13th Part VI, Cooke retired from acting. She has been married to Celestial Seasonings co-founder Mo Siegel since 1989 and gave birth to 2 children. She briefly returned to the public eye in 2013 when she was interviewed for Crystal Lake Memories, a retrospective documentary about the Friday the 13th film series, in which she recalled her role in Part VI.

== Filmography ==
Film and television
Year	Title	Role	Notes
1978	Tom and Joann	Amy Hammil	TV pilot
1978	Daddy, I Don't Like It Like This	Helen	TV movie
1979	ABC Afterschool Specials	Rosemary	Episode: "A Movie Star's Daughter"
1981–1983	Guiding Light	Morgan Richards Nelson	
1984	Summer	Melinda Danson	TV special
1984	Gimme an 'F'	Pam Bethlehem	
1984–1985	V	Elizabeth Maxwell	19 episodes
1985	The Hitchhiker	Eleanor Shepard	Episode: "Man's Best Friend"
1986	Friday the 13th Part VI: Jason Lives	Megan Garris	
1986	A Year in the Life	Debbie Nesbit	2 episodes
2013	Crystal Lake Memories: The Complete History of Friday the 13th	Herself	Documentary film
