= The Strange Case of Alice Cooper =

The Strange Case Of Alice Cooper

Video by Alice Cooper
- Released: 1979
- Recorded: April 9, 1979
- Genre: Musical; hard rock; heavy metal; shock rock
- Length: 73:01
- Label: Magnetic Video; Jaybar Industries; Historic Films Archives; Shout! Factory
- Director: Sterling Johnson
- Producer: Jackie Barnett

Alice Cooper chronology
Alice Cooper and Friends (1977)	The Strange Case Of Alice Cooper (1979)	The Nightmare Returns (1987)

The Strange Case of Alice Cooper is a live concert video released in September 1979, of Alice Cooper performing with his backing band The Ultra Latex Band. The concert was filmed on April 9, 1979 during Cooper's 'Madhouse Rock' Tour in San Diego, California, at the San Diego Sports Arena, in support of the album From the Inside.

Two songs that were performed during the filming, "All Strapped Up" and "Dead Babies", were omitted from the film for unknown reasons. A DVD version, with audio commentary by Alice Cooper, was released May 22, 2012 via Shout! Factory as a US-only release. Shout! Factory has also made the movie available digitally on their network for streaming and download.

== Track listing ==
1. Opening commentary and concert introduction (by Alice Cooper and Vincent Price) – 1:13
2. "From The Inside" (Alice Cooper, Dick Wagner, David Foster) – 5:48
3. "Serious" (Cooper, Bernie Taupin, Foster, Steve Lukather) – 2:50
4. "Nurse Rozetta" (Cooper, Lukather, Foster) – 1:53
5. "The Quiet Room" (Cooper, Taupin, Wagner) – 3:07
6. "I Never Cry" (Cooper, Wagner) – 1:51
7. "Devil's Food" (Cooper, Bob Ezrin, Kelly Jay) – 1:01
8. "Welcome To My Nightmare" (Cooper, Wagner) – 2:11
9. "Billion Dollar Babies" (Cooper, Michael Bruce, Reggie Vinson) – 1:49
10. "Only Women Bleed" (Cooper, Wager) – 2:24
11. "No More Mr. Nice Guy" (Cooper, Bruce) – 1:49
12. "I'm Eighteen" (Cooper, Bruce, Glen Buxton, Dennis Dunaway, Neal Smith) – 3:57
13. "The Black Widow" (Cooper, Wagner, Ezrin) – 5:34
14. "Wish I Were Born in Beverly Hills" (Cooper, Taupin, Wagner) – 3:50
15. "Ballad Of Dwight Fry" (Bruce, Cooper) – 5:26
16. "Go to Hell" (Cooper, Ezrin, Wagner) – 3:30
17. "How You Gonna See Me Now" (Cooper, Taupin, Wagner) – 4:21
18. "Inmates (We're All Crazy)" (Cooper, Taupin, Wagner) – 3:22
19. "School's Out" (Cooper, Bruce, Dunaway, Smith, Buxton) – 1:51
20. Introducing the Musicians, with solos – 11:44
21. "School's Out" (conclusion) – 2:07
22. Closing commentary and Credits (by Alice Cooper) – 1:23

== Credits ==
=== Musicians ===
- Alice Cooper – lead vocals

Ultra Latex Band

- Penti Glan (as Whitey Glan) – drums
- Steve Hunter – guitar
- Prakash John (as Johnny Stilletto) – bass
- Davey Johnstone – guitar
- Freddie Mandel – keyboards, piano, organ

=== Other stage performers ===
- Clifford Allen – dancer
- Rosa Aragon – dancer
- Sheryl Cooper – dancer
- Wendy Haas – background singer
- Eugene Montoya (as Martin Luther Queen) – dancer
- Joe Pizzulo – background singer
- Vincent Price – narrator (taped voice)
- Uchi Sugiyami – dancer

=== Filming ===
- Produced by Jackie Barnett
- Stage Production Conceived by Alice Cooper, Joe Gannon, Shep Gordon, Rob Iscove
- Recording Facilities by The Record Plant
- Executive Producers – Shep Gordon, Allan Strahl, Denny Vosburgh
- Director of Photography – Sterling Johnson
- Film Editor – Susan Trieste Collins
- Assistant Film Editor – Branda S. Miller
- Recording Engineer – Peter M. Carlson
- Cameramen – Don Burgess, Sterling Johnson, Harvey Weber, John Woodrudd, Carl Vidnic
- Assistant Cameramen – Shelly Johnson, Steve Lomas, Rod Paul, Mike Ritt, Randy Rowen, Patrick Taulere
- Lighting Consultant – Charles Lofthouse
- Multiple Screen Design – Steve Lomas
- Makeup Department – Denny Vosburgh

=== Re-release ===
- Executive Producer – Bob Emmer
- Editing Supervisor – Jo Morrow, Alice Cooper
- Audio Commentary – Alice Cooper
- Audio Commentary Editing – Alice Cooper, Jo Morrow
