= Friday the 13th Part VI: Jason Lives =

1986 film by Tom McLoughlin

- Theatrical release poster
- Directed by: Tom McLoughlin
- Written by: Tom McLoughlin
- Based on: Characters by Victor Miller
- Produced by: Don Behrns
- Starring: Thom Mathews; Jennifer Cooke; David Kagen; Renée Jones; Kerry Noonan; Darcy DeMoss; Tom Fridley
- Cinematography: Jon Kranhouse
- Edited by: Bruce Green
- Music by: Harry Manfredini
- Production companies: Terror, Inc.
- Distributed by: Paramount Pictures
- Release date: August 1, 1986
- Running time: 87 minutes
- Country: United States
- Language: English
- Budget: $3 million
- Box office: $19.5 million

Friday the 13th Part VI: Jason Lives (stylized onscreen as Jason Lives: Friday the 13th Part VI) is a 1986 American slasher film written and directed by Tom McLoughlin, and starring Thom Mathews, Jennifer Cooke, David Kagen, and C.J. Graham. It is a sequel to Friday the 13th: A New Beginning (1985) and the sixth installment in the Friday the 13th franchise. It was the final film to feature Tommy Jarvis (Mathews) as the protagonist and marked Tony Goldwyn's film debut. Continuing from the events of the previous film, the plot follows Tommy after he accidentally resurrects mass murderer Jason Voorhees (Graham) while attempting to destroy his body to ensure that he will not return. While Jason returns to Crystal Lake for another killing spree, Tommy must overcome his fear of the masked killer that has haunted him for years and find a way to stop him once and for all.

The original storyline had Tommy become the series' new antagonist, but after the poor reception of A New Beginning, the producers instead brought Jason Voorhees back. In resurrecting Jason, McLoughlin made him an explicitly supernatural force for the first time in the series. This version of Jason, an undead and more powerful superhuman, would become the standard depiction for the rest of the series. The film also introduced metahumor, Gothic fiction, and action film elements, including shootouts and car chases, into the series.

Jason Lives was the first and only film in the series to receive generally positive reviews from critics. In the years since its release, its self-referential humor and numerous instances of breaking the fourth wall have been praised for prefiguring Kevin Williamson's Scream film series. Jason Lives is considered a fan favorite of the series, in addition to receiving positive notice from horror film historians. It grossed $19.5 million at the U.S. box office on a budget of $3 million. The film was followed by Friday the 13th Part VII: The New Blood in 1988.

== Plot ==
One year after attempting to kill Pam Roberts, (Note: As depicted in Friday the 13th: A New Beginning (1985)) Tommy Jarvis is released from the local Hospital for the Criminally Insane. He still suffers from flashbacks of the mass murderer Jason Voorhees, whom he killed six years ago. (Note: As depicted in Friday the 13th: The Final Chapter (1984)) Tommy returns to Crystal Lake, renamed Forest Green, to confront his fears, along with his friend Allen Hawes. The pair visit Jason's grave during a thunderstorm, intending to cremate the killer's body and finally end Tommy's nightmares. After digging up Jason's corpse, Tommy experiences another flashback of his last encounter with Jason. As he impales Jason's body with a metal fence post, two lightning bolts strike the post; this restores Jason as a revenant with superhuman strength.

After killing Hawes by punching his heart out, Jason dons his hockey mask (which Tommy has brought). Tommy flees to the sheriff's office, where he attempts to warn the police of Jason's return. Instead, Tommy is arrested and jailed by Sheriff Mike Garris, who is aware of Tommy's institutionalization. Sheriff Garris presumes that Tommy is hallucinating Jason's return. On the road, camp counselors Darren and Lizbeth get lost looking for Camp Forest Green. They are ambushed and killed by Jason.

The next day, Garris' daughter Megan arrives at his station, along with her friends Sissy, Cort, and Lizbeth's sister Paula. The four teenagers report Darren and Lizbeth missing. Tommy warns them about Jason, who is now considered an urban legend. Despite her prompt attraction to him, Megan is unsure whether to believe Tommy. In the woods, Jason happens upon a corporate paintball game; he crushes the player Burt's face into a tree, decapitates three other players, and dismembers Roy, the final player. He also commandeers a machete from the players.

As children arrive at Camp Forest Green, the teen counselors do their best to run the camp. They keep wondering what has happened to Darren and Lizbeth. Meanwhile, Garris opts to transfer Tommy out of his jurisdiction to prevent anyone else from hearing his rants about Jason's return. On the way out of town, Tommy makes a run for Jason's grave, which Martin, the caretaker, has covered up to deny responsibility for the grave being robbed. Hawes' body is buried in Jason's place. A handcuffed Tommy is escorted out of town by Garris, who threatens him if he ever returns.

That night, Jason butchers Martin, along with a nearby couple who happen to witness the murder. Meanwhile, Cort meets with a girl named Nikki. Jason stalks Cort and Nikki in their RV and lures them outside but the teen couple drives away. Jason pulls Nikki into the RV's bathroom and kills her. Jason then kills Cort which flips the RV, before Jason walks out. When Garris' men find Darren and Lizbeth's bodies, Garris promptly implicates Tommy in the double murder. Garris is convinced that Tommy's "delusions" regarding Jason have driven him berserk.

Tommy contacts Megan for help luring Jason back to Crystal Lake, and she agrees. Meanwhile, Jason makes his way to the camp. He kills both Sissy and Paula but refrains from harming the children. Elsewhere, Garris pulls Tommy and Megan over and brings them back to the station. When he receives a call about the murders of Nikki and Cort, Megan points out that Tommy has been with her for the past few hours and could not have been responsible. Garris, however, remains unconvinced; he locks Tommy up and tells Megan he will decide what to do with her later.

Garris and two of his deputies Thornton and Pappas head out for the camp to arrest Tommy's (nonexistent) "accomplice". Jason attacks all three lawmen, forcing Garris to accept that Tommy is right all along. Megan breaks Tommy out of jail, and they rush to the camp. Garris is killed by Jason while trying to protect Megan.

Jason is about to kill Megan when Tommy calls to him from a boat out on the lake; remembering his killer, Jason goes after Tommy instead. Tommy chains a boulder around Jason's neck, trapping him underwater, but Jason demolishes the boat and drags him beneath the lake's surface. When Megan dives in to rescue Tommy, Jason grabs her leg; she pushes Jason off using the boat's outboard motor, sending him to the bottom of Crystal Lake. Megan swims Tommy back to shore and revives him via CPR. Tommy says that Jason is finally home. The final shot shows Jason underwater, still alive, but powerless to free himself.

== Cast ==
- Thom Mathews as Tommy Jarvis
- Jennifer Cooke as Megan Garris
- David Kagen as Sheriff Mike Garris
- Renee Jones as Sissy Baker
- Kerry Noonan as Paula Mott
- Darcy DeMoss as Nikki Parsley
- Tom Fridley as Cort Andrews
- Alan Blumenfeld as Larry
- Matthew Faison as Stan
- Ann Ryerson as Katie
- Tony Goldwyn as Darren Robinson
- Nancy McLoughlin as Lizbeth Mott
- Ron Palillo as Allen Hawes
- C. J. Graham as Jason Voorhees
- Vincent Guastaferro as Deputy Rick Cologne
- Michael Swan as Officer Pappas
- Courtney Vickery as Nancy
- Whitney Rydbeck as Roy
- Bob Larkin as Martin
- Wallace Merck as Burt
- Tommy Nowell as Tyen
- Justin Nowell as Billy
- Temi Epstein as Little Girl
- Michael Nomad as Officer Thornton
- Roger Rose as Steven Halavex
- Cynthia Kania as Annette Edwards

While C.J. Graham is credited as Jason Voorhees, Dan Bradley appears uncredited as Jason in the paintball scene.

== Production ==
=== Pre-production and writing ===
Although the previous film in the series, Friday the 13th: A New Beginning, had been a financial success, it had disappointed the Friday the 13th series' fans and received some of the worst reviews of any film in the series. In order to prevent further alienating the fans (and thus potentially endangering the series), the producers decided to take the series in a new direction, moving it away from what producer Frank Mancuso Jr. called the "coarse" nature of A New Beginning.

To this end, Mancuso hired Tom McLoughlin, who had directed the successful horror film One Dark Night but was also known around Hollywood for shopping around various comedy scripts he had written, a dichotomy that appealed to Mancuso. McLoughlin was given free rein on how he would present the story, with the only condition being that he bring back Jason Voorhees and make him the film's villain.

McLoughlin decided to take the film in the direction of an old Universal Monsters movie, specifically the 1931 version of Frankenstein, which portrayed Frankenstein's Monster (Boris Karloff) as a lumbering killer brought to life by electricity. McLoughlin also drew from vampire lore in order to give Jason a weakness, namely being returned to his "home soil"; to achieve this, McLoughlin disregarded the idea presented in Part 2 that Jason had survived his drowning, instead presenting the idea that Jason has always been some sort of supernatural force. He also decided to retcon the ending of the fifth film, where Tommy Jarvis (John Shepherd) was a serial killer. In fact, Pam Roberts (Melanie Kinnaman)'s truck from the fifth film can be seen indicating she is alive. In the "Tommy Tapes" for Friday the 13th: The Game (2017) written by Adam Green, it's explained that the ending of the fifth film was Tommy's dream.

McLoughlin further decided to expand the series' thematic scope, incorporating action film elements and postmodern metahumor; when Jason is first encountered in the woods near Crystal Lake, the character Lizbeth Mott (Nancy McLoughlin) comments that she and Darren Robinson (Tony Goldwyn) should flee because she knows about proper conduct to survive a horror film. McLoughlin would further satirize the series itself, as Martin the gravedigger (Bob Larkin) comments on Jason's exhumation, "Why'd they have to go and dig up Jason?" before breaking the fourth wall and addressing the camera with the observation, "Some folks sure got a strange idea of entertainment." In addition to Frankenstein, McLoughlin also cited as inspiration his love of Gothic horror, particularly the works of Edgar Allan Poe, and his Catholic upbringing; Jason Lives features the series' only explicit references to God, and during the climax Nancy Perry (Courtney Vickery), a praying girl, is spared by Jason (C. J. Graham). A similar scene, in which Nancy prays for Tommy (Thom Mathews) while Megan Garris (Jennifer Cooke) performs CPR, then mouths "Thank you" while looking skyward was deleted from the final cut of the movie, apparently against McLoughlin's wishes; he recalled in the 2009 DVD's director's commentary, "Somehow it didn't stay in... probably too much sentiment".

=== Casting ===
The decision to retcon the events of Part V resulted in many members of that film's cast—whose characters had survived—having their contracts to return for a sequel terminated. At one point in time when Jason Lives was being considered as a direct sequel to A New Beginning rather than to Friday the 13th: The Final Chapter, the surviving characters Pam and Reggie Winter (Shavar Ross) from A New Beginning were to have died in the film's opening moments.

Although Mancuso retained control over the film's casting, he deferred to McLoughlin's judgment; the only caveat was that the final girl had to be a "very attractive blonde". To fulfill this requirement, McLoughlin chose Jennifer Cooke, based on her performance in the television series V. The role of Allen Hawes, Tommy's would-be sidekick who dies within the first five minutes of the movie, was given to another television veteran, Ron Palillo, famous for the role of Arnold Horshack on Welcome Back, Kotter.

John Shepherd was asked to reprise his role as Tommy Jarvis from the previous film. Shepherd, an evangelical Christian who had reservations about returning to the series based on the atmosphere surrounding A New Beginning, was attracted to Jason Lives based on the scene in which the praying Nancy is spared by Jason. He ultimately decided to film Caught and shortly thereafter retired from acting to go to seminary. Thom Mathews, who would take over the mantel of Tommy Jarvis, was chosen for his work in the horror comedy Return of the Living Dead, although McLoughlin himself was unaware of Matthews' horror credentials until after shooting began. Other cast members were actors who McLoughlin had directed before (such as David Kagen, who was also an acting teacher for female lead Jennifer Cooke) and McLoughlin's own family—Jason's first female victim in the film, Lizbeth, was played by McLoughlin's wife, Nancy. In keeping with the series' tradition, the role of Jason was given to a stuntman, Dan Bradley. Bradley, however, was replaced shortly thereafter by C. J. Graham. Bradley's involvement during the paintball scene is kept.

=== Filming ===
Principal photography began on March 10, 1986, in Covington, Georgia, and surrounding areas, including Hard Labor Creek State Park in Rutledge, Georgia. The production was scheduled for eight weeks, five of which involved night shoots. According to production notes preserved by the American Film Institute, McLoughlin and cinematographer Jon Kranhouse sought a more stylized visual approach, employing sweeping camera movements, strong backlighting and vivid colors.

The fictional Camp Forest Green was filmed at Camp Daniel Morgan, situated within Hard Labor Creek State Park. The location is identified as one of the film's production sites by the official tourism website for Madison and Morgan County, Georgia.

Some of the climactic moments in the lake were actually filmed in the swimming pool of McLoughlin's father. McLoughlin ruined the pool's filter in the process (it was jammed by gore churned into the water when Jason is hit with the boat propeller).

=== Post-production ===
McLoughlin's attempt to deliver a "different" kind of Friday the 13th film were met with skepticism from the producers. In contrast to the series' other entries, which had to be edited for violence in order to avoid an "X" rating, the film's producers requested that McLoughlin add more gore, violence, and murders to the film. The original cut of the film contained 13 killings as an in-joke; in order to appease the studio, McLoughlin had to add an additional three killings, bringing the total up to 16. These were the killings of Martin the gravedigger, and the recently engaged couple Steven Halavex (Roger Rose) and Annette Edwards (Cynthia Kania) on a nighttime picnic. McLoughlin later said he felt the shot in which the picnicking man Steven realizes that he's been spotted by Jason to be the film's scariest moment. Unlike the other films in the Friday the 13th series, Jason Lives contains no nudity. In a 2017 retrospective for GQ, Scott Meslow highlighted the film's reduced emphasis on sex and graphic violence as part of its more humorous approach to the franchise. In a 2020 interview, McLoughlin described the absence of nudity as partly accidental and recalled allowing Darcy DeMoss to remain clothed if she felt uncomfortable filming her scene.

Additionally, McLoughlin was made to extend Sissy Baker (Renée Jones)'s death, adding the shots of Jason dragging her to the ground and twisting her head off; as originally filmed, Sissy was simply pulled out of the cabin window, and wasn't seen again until Megan finds her head in the squad car.

McLoughlin also found himself in contention with the producers over how the film should end. In the original script, the movie was supposed to have concluded in the graveyard, with Martin the gravedigger meeting Jason's father, Elias—a heretofore unseen character in the series—with the implication that Elias knows Jason has been resurrected and has come looking for him. The studio balked at the scene, as they did not want the responsibility of having to introduce Elias' backstory in the next installment. Elias would appear in his first debut appearance in the television series Crystal Lake in 2026. Additionally, the added murder of Martin made the scene a continuity error. This ending would have tied up a continuity error from A New Beginning, when it is mentioned that Jason was cremated. A deleted scene from Jason Lives had Tommy asking Sheriff Mike Garris (Kagen) why Jason wasn't cremated, as had been planned, at which point Garris informs him that someone paid the city to bury Jason; Elias' handing Martin a wad of money would have indicated that he was the man who paid for Jason's burial. The scene was later storyboarded for inclusion on the film's "Deluxe Edition" DVD release, with Bob Larkin reprising his role as Martin to provide voiceover. Elias, like Jason, was scripted to be completely silent.

McLoughlin ultimately shot three endings, two of which were not included on the film's DVD release. In one ending, Jason's mask floats to the surface of Crystal Lake, having become detached during his struggle with Megan. In another, Deputy Rick Cologne (Vincent Guastaferro) tries to reach the jail cell keys after having been locked in by Tommy and Megan; the door to the police station opens and the film abruptly ends, indicating that Jason managed to get free. The producers disliked both of these endings, as each one left Jason's survival ambiguous, and wanted it explicitly shown onscreen that he was still capable of returning for a sequel. As a result, McLoughlin shot the film's used ending, showing a closeup of Jason's open, twitching eye.

== Music ==
Friday the 13th Part VI: Jason Lives

Soundtrack album by Harry Manfredini
- Released: January 13, 2012 (La-La Land)
- Recorded: 1986
- Genre: Film score
- Length: 1:00:12
- Label: La-La Land

The film's music was composed by Harry Manfredini, who composed the scores to all of the series' previous installments. In addition to the original score, the soundtrack also featured:

- "He's Back (The Man Behind the Mask)" by Alice Cooper, from his album Constrictor
- "I'm No Animal" by Felony, from their album Vigilante
- "Teenage Frankenstein" by Alice Cooper, from his album Constrictor
- "Hard Rock Summer" by Alice Cooper, from the box set The Life and Crimes of Alice Cooper

"He's Back (The Man Behind the Mask)" was accompanied by a music video combining footage from Jason Lives with newly filmed sequences featuring Alice Cooper. In a contemporary report published in Fangoria in 1987, journalist Marc Shapiro described visiting the music video's set in Southern California, where Cooper performed alongside actors portraying teenagers and a masked killer.

On January 13, 2012, La-La Land Records released a limited edition 6-CD boxset containing Manfredini's scores from the first six Friday the 13th films. Unlike Parts 1–5, which used the films sound stems as a source for the music, Manfredini had the original master tapes in his possession and it was this source that was used to remaster the audio. It sold out in less than 24 hours, with this disc being reissued on September 13, 2019, using the same 2012 master. On June 27, 2025, La-La Land Records released an expanded edition titled "The Ultimate Cut", remastered from the original source tapes and featuring cues not heard or used in the final film.

== Reception ==
=== Box office ===
Friday the 13th Part VI: Jason Lives opened on August 1, 1986, in 1,610 theaters and grossed $6.7 million in its opening weekend, ranking number two at the US box office. Ultimately, it would go on to gross a total of $19.4 million, ranking at number 46 on the list of the year's top earners, though still a financial success, its 5,248,533 admissions were the lowest number of tickets sold of any Friday the 13th film up to that point.

=== Critical response ===
On the review aggregator website Rotten Tomatoes, Friday the 13th Part VI: Jason Lives holds an approval rating of 38% based on 89 reviews. The site's critics consensus reads: "Jason Lives thanks to an injection of self-aware humor and directorial flair from Tom McLoughlin, only to be struck down by the usual pattern of predictable Friday the 13th carnage." On Metacritic, it has a weighted average score of 30 out of 100, based on 10 critics, indicating "generally unfavorable" reviews. Audiences polled by CinemaScore gave the film an average grade of "B" on an A+ to F scale.

Variety described the film as predictable but "reasonably slick". Caryn James of The New York Times called it "a gory waste of time", citing numerous logic problems and stating that McLoughlin's injecting humor into the series, while successful, was not enough to liven up the predictability of the story. Gene Siskel of the Chicago Tribune similarly judged that while the film's self-referential humor was good enough to make it the best film in the series, it was not enough to take away from the story being essentially the same as in the previous five installments. He gave it 1 1/2 stars.

In a 2012 retrospective review, Ken Hanke of Mountain Xpress wrote that it "may not be exactly a good movie in the strict sense, but it's easily the best in the series", noting that he had seen all ten installments which had been released at the time. David Nusair said the film has "probably the most effective pre-credits sequence in the entire franchise ... just the sort of appreciatively ludicrous interlude that's generally been sorely missing from this pervasively dull series". However, he felt the bulk of the film, while an improvement over the previous two installments, suffered from tedious pacing and a lack of gore. He gave it two out of four stars, the same rating he gave to six out of the series' ten installments.

== Novelization ==
A novelization of the film, written by Simon Hawke, was published by Signet in August 1986. The novelization incorporates material not included in the completed film, including an appearance by Jason's father. Writer-director Tom McLoughlin had originally planned an ending in which Mr. Voorhees visited the cemetery containing the graves of his wife and son, but the sequence was never filmed.
