= School's Out (album) =

Studio album by Alice Cooper
- Released: June 13, 1972
- Recorded: 1972
- Studios: Record Plant, New York City
- Genres: Hard rock; glam rock; garage rock
- Length: 36:56
- Label: Warner Bros.
- Producer: Bob Ezrin

Alice Cooper chronology
Killer (1971)	School's Out (1972)	Billion Dollar Babies (1973)

Singles from School's Out
- 1. "School's Out" Released: April 26, 1972

School's Out is the fifth studio album by American rock band Alice Cooper, released in June 1972. Following the success of Killer, the album reached No. 2 on the US Billboard 200 chart and No. 1 on the Canadian RPM 100 Top Albums chart, holding the top position for four weeks. The single "School's Out" reached No. 7 on the Billboard Hot 100, No. 3 on the Canadian RPM Top Singles Chart and went to No. 1 in the UK Singles Chart.

== Packaging ==
The original album cover (designed by Craig Braun) had the sleeve opening in the manner of a wooden school desk, similar to Thinks: School Stinks, by Hotlegs, released two years earlier. The band members' names appear in the form of graffiti carved into the desk. The vinyl record inside was wrapped in a pair of panties, though this was later discontinued as the paper panties were found to be flammable. Less noticeable is the die cut back cover that opens up to hold the cover upright, similar to the back of some picture frames. The desk photographed for the album cover is on display in the Hard Rock Cafe in Las Vegas.

Also carved into the desk is the logo of Warner Bros. Records, the group's record company. This was removed on all pressings after 2019 when the company rebranded as Warner Records and their license to the "Warner Bros." name and shield logo with WarnerMedia expired.

== Reception ==
Professional ratings
Review scores
Source	Rating
AllMusic	4.5/5 stars
Christgau's Record Guide	B−
Rolling Stone	(mixed)

Ian Chapman has put forward a theory that it was a concept album about youth lost when leaving school.

AllMusic reviewer Tim Sendra states that "half the joy derived from listening to School's Out is to marvel at how daringly the band took all the goodwill they had engendered to this point and blew up their just-barely-established template in fascinating, almost reckless ways.

== Live performances ==
Although the title track remains the most-performed song in Alice Cooper's live shows, in accordance with the conceptual nature of School's Out, the album has overall a smaller representation in his live setlist than Love It to Death, Killer, Billion Dollar Babies, or Welcome to My Nightmare, accounting for only 6.8 percent of the songs Cooper has played live. "Gutter Cat Vs. The Jets" and "Public Animal #9" were the only other School's Out songs played on the supporting School's Out For Summer '72 tour, but neither became a permanent part of setlist and "Gutter Cat" was last performed in 2004 on the Eyes of Alice Cooper tour. Short instrumental "Street Fight" was never performed until the 1980 Flush the Fashion tour, and was last played on the School's Out for Summer '97 tour, while "My Stars" was a regular part of setlists on the 1973–1974 Billion Dollar Babies Tour but never played again until 2019 when it became a regular on the Ol' Black Eyes Is Back Tour. "Blue Turk", "Alma Mater" and "Grand Finale" have never been performed live, and "Luney Tune" only once, during the Psychodrama Tour at Grand Canyon University on May 9, 2009 with Cooper tribute band Halo of Flies.

== Track listing ==
Side one
No.	Title	Writer(s)	Length
1.	"School's Out"	Alice Cooper, Michael Bruce, Glen Buxton, Dennis Dunaway, Neal Smith	3:30
2.	"Luney Tune"	Dunaway, Cooper	3:44
3.	"Gutter Cat vs. the Jets"	Buxton, Dunaway, Leonard Bernstein, Stephen Sondheim	4:40
4.	"Street Fight" (Instrumental)	Cooper, Buxton, Bruce, Dunaway, Smith	0:55
5.	"Blue Turk"	Bruce, Cooper	5:34

Side two
No.	Title	Writer(s)	Length
1.	"My Stars"	Cooper, Bob Ezrin	5:49
2.	"Public Animal #9"	Bruce, Cooper	3:55
3.	"Alma Mater"	Smith	4:27
4.	"Grande Finale" (Instrumental)	Mack David, Elmer Bernstein, Bob Ezrin, Cooper, Smith, Dunaway, Buxton, Bruce	4:26

== Personnel ==
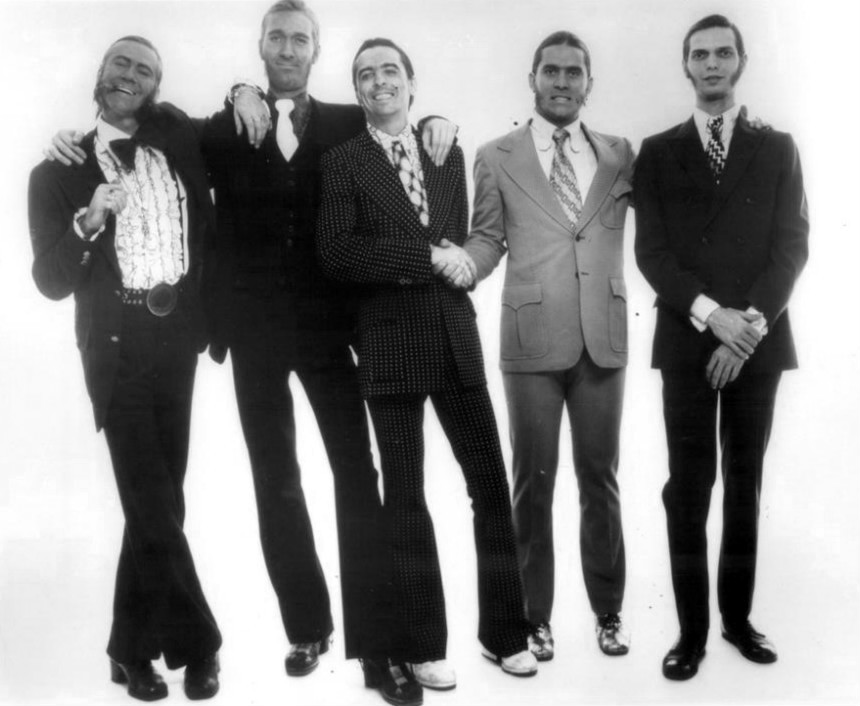
Alice Cooper in 1973. Left to right: Glen Buxton, Neal Smith, Alice Cooper, Michael Bruce, Dennis Dunaway.

Alice Cooper band

- Alice Cooper – vocals
- Glen Buxton – lead guitar
- Michael Bruce – rhythm guitar, keyboards, backing vocals
- Dennis Dunaway – bass guitar, backing vocals
- Neal Smith – drums, backing vocals

Additional musicians

- Bob Ezrin – keyboards
- Dick Wagner – guitar
- Wayne Andre – trombone on "Blue Turk"

== Charts ==
=== Weekly charts ===
1972–1973 weekly chart performance for School's Out
Chart (1972–1973)	Peak position
Australian Albums (Kent Music Report)	5
Austrian Albums (Ö3 Austria)	8
Canada Top Albums/CDs (RPM)	1
Finnish Albums (Suomen virallinen lista)	3
German Albums (Offizielle Top 100)	3
Norwegian Albums (VG-lista)	8
UK Albums (Official Charts)	4
US Billboard 200	2

2023 weekly chart performance for School's Out
Chart (2023)	Peak position
Hungarian Albums (MAHASZ)	35
Swiss Albums (Schweizer Hitparade)	83

=== Year-end charts ===
1972 year-end chart performance for School's Out
Chart (1972)	Position
German Albums (Offizielle Top 100)	44

1973 year-end chart performance for School's Out
Chart (1973)	Position
German Albums (Offizielle Top 100)	30

== Certifications ==
Region	Certification	Certified units/sales
Australia (ARIA)	Gold	20,000^{^}
United States (RIAA)	Platinum	1,000,000^{^}
^{^} Shipments figures based on certification alone.
