= Zipper Catches Skin =

Studio album by Alice Cooper
- Released: August 25, 1982
- Recorded: Mid-1982
- Studio: Cherokee (Los Angeles)
- Genres: Hard rock; pop rock; new wave
- Length: 32:25
- Label: Warner Bros.
- Producers: Alice Cooper and Erik Scott; "I Am the Future" – Steve Tyrell

Alice Cooper chronology
Special Forces (1981)	Zipper Catches Skin (1982)	Toronto Rock 'n' Roll Revival 1969, Volume IV (1982)

Singles from Zipper Catches Skin
- 1. "I Like Girls" Released: August 1982; 2. "I Am the Future" Released: October 1982

Zipper Catches Skin is the seventh solo and overall fourteenth studio album by American rock singer Alice Cooper, released on August 25, 1982, by Warner Bros. Records.

== Background and recording ==
The album was co-produced by bassist Erik Scott alongside Cooper, who blended new wave and pop rock music into his hard rock style in an attempt to keep up with changing musical trends. Scott stated the album "was meant to be lean, stripped down, and low on frills. Punkish and bratty." At the time, Cooper described Zipper Catches Skin as "totally kill. Real hardcore. The stuff that I do has always been a lot like that. In fact, I invented a couple of songs that were remakes of other songs, just for the purpose of attacking clichés. There are no clichés on this album, and I did that for a specific reason. Rock and roll right now is jammed with clichés." Cooper described the photograph of him on the album's back cover as "very Haggar slacks. I look good. I look like a GQ ad, only I'm zipping up my pants and you can see definite pain on my face."

Long-time Cooper guitarist Dick Wagner, who left halfway through the recording sessions, described Zipper Catches Skin as "the off to the races speedy album" and a "drug induced nightmare". Wagner later revealed in a segment of the Deleted Scenes on the biographical documentary film Super Duper Alice Cooper (2014) that Cooper was smoking crack cocaine at the time and had a curtain set up behind the recording mic with a stool on it where he kept his crack pipe; he and other members of the band would sneak behind the curtain to take hits in between recording takes.

Zipper Catches Skin is the second of three studio albums which Cooper refers to as his "blackout" albums, the others being the preceding album, Special Forces (1981), and the following album, DaDa (1983), as he has no recollection of recording them, due to the substance abuse, although he did manage to film a television advertisement intended to promote Zipper Catches Skin at the time. Cooper stated "I wrote them, recorded them and toured them and I don't remember much of any of that", though he actually toured only Special Forces, the tour for which ended in February 1982. There was no tour to promote Zipper Catches Skin, and none of its songs have ever been played live. Despite this, Cooper has said he is proud of the music, and is surprised how good it is despite his state at the time. Also expressing his desire for the albums to be re-recorded to some degree...."I would actually like to go back and re-record those three albums because I never really gave them their due. I love the songs – I just don't remember writing them. My subconscious was writing some pretty good tracks! There's 'Zorro's Ascent' and 'No Baloney Homosapiens' for example where now I'm going, "Wow, that's clever!" (laughs).

== Release and critical reception ==
Professional ratings
Review scores
Source	Rating
AllMusic	2.5/5 stars
Sounds	3/5 stars

Despite "I Am the Future" being featured in the crime thriller film Class of 1984 (1982) as its theme song, and the Waitresses' lead vocalist Patty Donahue appearing on the single "I Like Girls", Zipper Catches Skin failed to chart in most countries, including in the U.S. where it became Cooper's first studio album to not dent the Billboard Top 200 since Easy Action (1970).

In a 30th anniversary retrospective, Ultimate Classic Rock described it "an off-kilter hybrid of the Knack and the Cars."

In a retrospective review for AllMusic, critic Donald A. Guarisco wrote that ".. while it's not a success on the level of Billion Dollar Babies or Welcome to My Nightmare, it is surprisingly listenable. Cooper is also assisted by an enthusiastic and energetic performance by the band, who transform tunes like "I Better Be Good" and "Remarkably Insincere" into effective fusions of hard rock riffing and new wave staccato rhythms. While the experimental spirit that drives these songs is refreshing, none of the songs ever jells in a way that would create a cohesive album and none of the songs is strong enough to join the ranks of classics. That said, Zipper Catches Skin contains enough solid tracks to make it a worthwhile listen for hardcore Alice Cooper fans."

== Track listing ==
Side one
No.	Title	Writer(s)	Length
1.	"Zorro's Ascent"	Alice Cooper; John Nitzinger; Billy Steele; Erik Scott	3:56
2.	"Make That Money (Scrooge's Song)"	Cooper; Dick Wagner	3:30
3.	"I Am the Future" (From the Motion Picture Class of 1984)	Gary Osborne; Lalo Schifrin	3:29
4.	"No Baloney Homosapiens (For Steve & E.T.)"	Cooper; Wagner	5:06

Side two
No.	Title	Writer(s)	Length
5.	"Adaptable (Anything for You)"	Cooper; Steele; Scott	2:56
6.	"I Like Girls"	Cooper; Nitzinger; Scott	2:25
7.	"Remarkably Insincere"	Cooper; Nitzinger; Scott	2:07
8.	"Tag, You're It"	Cooper; Nitzinger; Scott	2:54
9.	"I Better Be Good"	Cooper; Wagner; Scott	2:48
10.	"I'm Alive (That Was the Day My Dead Pet Returned to Save My Life)"	Cooper; Wagner; Scott	3:13
Total length:			32:25

== Personnel ==
Credits are adapted from the Zipper Catches Skin liner notes.

Musicians

- Alice Cooper – vocals, synthesizer
- Dick Wagner – guitar
- Mike Pinera – guitar
- Erik Scott – bass
- Jan Uvena – drums, percussion
- John Nitzinger – guitar
- Billy Steele – guitar
- Duane Hitchings – synthesizer
- Craig Krampf – percussion
- Frannie Golde – backing vocals
- Joanne Harris – backing vocals
- Flo & Eddie – backing vocals
- Patty Donahue – guest vocals and "sarcasm" on "I Like Girls"

== Charts ==
Chart (1982)	Peak position
Canada Top Albums/CDs (RPM)	94
