= Alice Cooper a Paris =

- Title Screen
- Directed by: Agnès Delarive
- Written by: Agnès Delarive
- Starring: Alice Cooper; Sheryl Cooper; Duane Hitchings; John Nitzinger; Mike Pinera; Erik Scott; Jan Uvena
- Cinematography: Thierry Malaterre
- Music by: Alice Cooper
- Release date: January 14, 1982 (France)
- Running time: 46 minutes
- Languages: English, French

Alice Cooper a Paris (more commonly known as Alice in Paris) is a French television special starring American rock singer Alice Cooper.

A series of music videos of songs from his then-current studio album Special Forces (1981) with a few songs from Flush the Fashion (1980) and some older hits mixed in, several songs were re-recorded for the special ("Only Women Bleed", "I'm Eighteen", "Billion Dollar Babies", "School's Out") and have shown up as B-sides of singles with crowd noises mixed in to give the illusion that they were live recordings. The songs are performed in English, but one brief split-screen sketch features French dialogue as radio disc jockey Vincent Furnier (Cooper's real name) interviews Alice.

There has never been an official release and, while not officially broadcast outside France except for Denmark (Danmarks Radio TV), copies have been circulating amongst Alice Cooper fans for decades. Some copies are missing opening credits, leading fans to refer to it under a variety of titles, including Alice in Paris, The Paris Special and 16 Tracks.

== Track listing ==
1. "You and Me" (partial)
2. "Generation Landslide '81"
3. "Under My Wheels"
4. "Clones (We're All)"
5. "Pain"
6. "Seven and Seven Is"
7. "Prettiest Cop on the Block"
8. "Model Citizen"
9. "Cold Ethyl"
10. "Only Women Bleed"
11. "Go to Hell"
12. "Who Do You Think We Are?"
13. "Vicious Rumours"
14. "I'm Eighteen"
15. "Billion Dollar Babies"
16. "School's Out"
17. "Who Do You Think We Are? (reprise)"
