= Elected (song) =

Single by Alice Cooper

- Single cover

Single by Alice Cooper

from the album Billion Dollar Babies
- B-side: "Luney Tune"
- Released: September 6, 1972
- Recorded: August 1972
- Genre: Hard rock
- Length: 4:05 (album version); 3:40 (single version)
- Label: Warner Bros.
- Songwriters: Alice Cooper; Glen Buxton; Michael Bruce; Dennis Dunaway; Neal Smith
- Producer: Bob Ezrin

Alice Cooper singles chronology
"School's Out" (1972)	"Elected" (1972)	"Hello Hooray" (1973)

Official video
- "Elected" on YouTube

"Elected" is a song by American rock band Alice Cooper, released in 1972 as the first single off their sixth studio album, Billion Dollar Babies (1973). It reached number 26 during election week on charts in the United States, number 4 in the United Kingdom and number 3 in Austria. The promotional music video was directed by Hart Perry.

== Composition ==
"Elected" is a hard rock song with glam rock influences. Its political theme was inspired by the 1972 United States presidential election. Cooper called the song "total political satire", and added "we hated politics, but the idea of Alice, the scourge of the entire world, being president was just too good."

Both the riff and part of the melody were recycled from "Reflected" which appeared on their 1969 album Pretties for You.

== Legacy ==
Joey Ramone acknowledged the similarity between "Elected" and his band's song "I Wanna Be Sedated" according to Alice Cooper.

The song was a favorite of John Lennon, who called it "a great record" but added Paul McCartney would've done it better, which Cooper agreed with.

== Charts ==
Chart (1972)	Peak position
United States	26
United Kingdom	4
Austria	3
Netherlands	5
Ireland	8
West Germany	3

== Track listing ==
No.	Title	Length
1.	"Elected"	3:40
2.	"Luney Tune"	3:36

== Album appearances ==
- Billion Dollar Babies - 1973
- Alice Cooper's Greatest Hits - 1974
- The Beast of Alice Cooper - 1989
- The Life and Crimes of Alice Cooper - 1999
- Mascara and Monsters: The Best of Alice Cooper - 2001
- The Definitive Alice Cooper - 2001
- The Essentials: Alice Cooper - 2002
- School's Out and Other Hits - 2004

== Personnel ==
- Alice Cooper – vocals
- Glen Buxton – lead guitar
- Michael Bruce – rhythm guitar
- Dennis Dunaway – bass
- Neal Smith – drums

== Covers ==
"(I Want To Be) Elected"

Single by Mr. Bean and Smear Campaign ft. Bruce Dickinson
- B-side: "(I Want To Be) Elected"
- Released: April 1992
- Recorded: 1992
- Genre: Hard rock; comedy rock
- Length: 4:28
- Label: London Records (for Comic Relief)
- Songwriters: A. Cooper, D. Dunaway, G. Buxton, M. Bruce, N. Smith
- Producer: Chris Tsangarides

- In 1992, a cover version titled "(I Want To Be) Elected" by Rowan Atkinson (as Mr. Bean) and Smear Campaign was released in support of the British charity Comic Relief and featured a performance by Bruce Dickinson and members of the hard rock band Taste (later known as Skin). The record was released in the run up to the United Kingdom General Election of 1992 and reached No. 9 on the UK Singles Chart and No. 27 on the UK Airplay Chart. The music video, in which Mr. Bean's doorstep canvassing and electoral stunts are intercut with the live video of Dickinson and the band, was directed by Paul Weiland.
- British hard rock band Def Leppard recorded a live version in 1987, which was used as a B-side for their songs "Heaven Is" and "Stand Up (Kick Love Into Motion)" from their 1992 album Adrenalize.
- Following the death of Paddy Ashdown on December 22, 2018, the music video was broadcast by ITV on December 24, 2018, and featured a title card paying tribute to Ashdown.
