= Flash Fearless Vs. the Zorg Women, Pts. 5 & 6 =

Flash Fearless vs. the Zorg Women, Pts. 5 & 6

Studio album by various artists
- Released: 1975
- Recorded: October 1 – December 31, 1974
- Genres: Rock; hard rock; heavy metal; progressive rock; soft rock
- Length: 38:20
- Label: Chrysalis

Professional ratings
Review scores
Source	Rating
AllMusic	3.0/5 stars

Flash Fearless Vs. the Zorg Women, Pts. 5 & 6 is a comic book hero idea put to music with Alice Cooper, Elkie Brooks, Black Oak Arkansas' Jim Dandy, the Who's John Entwistle and Keith Moon, Justin Hayward, Carmine Appice, Eddie Jobson, Nicky Hopkins, Kenney Jones, Thunderthighs, Bill Bruford, James Dewar and many others.

== Track listing ==
1. Trapped – 4:10 (vocal by Elkie Brooks)
2. I'm Flash – 3:09 (vocal by Alice Cooper)
3. Country Cooking – 5:03 (vocal by Jim "Dandy" Mangrum)
4. What's Happening – 6:51 (vocal by James Dewar)
5. Space Pirates – 3:13 (vocal by Alice Cooper, speech by Keith Moon)
6. Sacrifice – 3:55 (vocal by Elkie Brooks)
7. Let's Go to the Chop – 2:41 (vocal by John Entwistle)
8. Supersnatch Fearless Flash – 3:24 (vocal by Frankie Miller)
9. Georgia Sycopator Fearless Flash – 3:02 (instrumental)
10. Blast Off – 4:33 (vocal by Jim "Dandy" Mangrum)
11. Trapped – 1:24 (instrumental by Eddie Jobson)

== Charts ==
Various artists original studio cast.

Chart (1975)	Peak	Ref.
US Billboard FM Action	9	
US Record World	181	
US Billboard Bubbling Under the Top LP's	209	
