= Prince of Darkness (Alice Cooper album) =

Compilation album by Alice Cooper
- Released: November 15, 1989
- Genre: Rock, hard rock, heavy metal
- Length: 38:21

Alice Cooper chronology
Trash (1989)	Prince of Darkness (1989)	Hey Stoopid (1991)

Professional ratings
Review scores
Source	Rating
AllMusic	2/5 stars
The Rolling Stone Album Guide	1/5 stars

Prince of Darkness is a compilation album by Alice Cooper released in 1989. There is no new material released on the album; however the live version of "Billion Dollar Babies" (Live) was only released as the B-Side to the MCA single of "He's Back (The Man Behind the Mask)" thus making this CD its only official digital release.

== Track listing ==
1. "Prince of Darkness"
2. "Roses on White Lace"
3. "Teenage Frankenstein"
4. "He's Back (The Man Behind the Mask)"
5. "Billion Dollar Babies" (Live)
6. "Lock Me Up"
7. "Simple Disobedience"
8. "Thrill My Gorilla"
9. "Life and Death of the Party"
10. "Freedom"
