= Freedom (Alice Cooper song) =

- Single cover

Single by Alice Cooper

from the album Raise Your Fist and Yell
- B-side: "Time to Kill"
- Released: November 1987 (US); March 1988 (UK)
- Recorded: 1987
- Genre: Heavy metal
- Length: 4:09
- Label: MCA Records
- Songwriter(s): Alice Cooper, Kane Roberts
- Producer(s): Alice Cooper

Alice Cooper singles chronology
"Teenage Frankenstein" (1987)	"Freedom" (1987)	"Poison" (1989)

Music video
- "Freedom" on YouTube

"Freedom" is a song by American rock musician Alice Cooper, released in 1987 as the only single from his tenth solo album, Raise Your Fist and Yell. It was written by Alice Cooper and Kane Roberts.

Freedom is a protest song, aimed at the Parents Music Resource Center, co-founded by Tipper Gore in 1985, who published a "Filthy Fifteen" list of morally objectionable songs and stuck Parental Advisory stickers on albums with explicit lyrics.

== Overview ==
"Freedom" is aimed at the Parents Music Resource Center, co-founded by Tipper Gore in 1985, who published a "Filthy Fifteen" list of morally objectionable songs and stuck Parental Advisory stickers on albums with explicit lyrics.

Cooper told Metal Hammer in 1988:

"I wrote the song 'Freedom' instead of a letter of complaint to let the PMRC and everyone they stand for know what I think about them. This group mustn't be taken too seriously. Really, they are just four old ladies in Washington who try and get as much publicity as possible for their husbands, who are all influential politicians. Since the main man behind the PMRC, Albert Gore, has admitted himself that he used to smoke pot and listen to loud rock music when he was a kid, the movement won't last long anyway."

== Music video ==
The music video, made to promote the single, features a large metal tower being lowered on a concert stage. Alice Cooper appears and sings as his band plays around him.

== Track listing ==
U.S. vinyl
No.	Title	Length
1.	"Freedom"	4:09
2.	"Time to Kill"	3:43

U.S. cassette
No.	Title	Length
1.	"Freedom"	4:08
2.	"Time to Kill"	3:43
3.	"Freedom"	4:08
4.	"Time to Kill"	3:43

European vinyl
No.	Title	Length
1.	"Freedom"	4:09
2.	"School's Out" (Live)	3:11
3.	"Time to Kill"	3:43

Promotional vinyl
No.	Title	Length
1.	"Freedom"	4:08

== Personnel ==
- Alice Cooper – vocals
- Kane Roberts – guitar
- Kip Winger III – bass
- Paul Horowitz – keyboards
- Ken K. Mary – drums

== Chart positions ==
Year	Chart	Position
1988	UK Singles Chart	50

== Reception ==
The song did not chart in the US when released in late 1987; however, it reached #50 on the UK charts in early 1988. The single's B-side in both countries is the album track "Time to Kill". This was Cooper's last single released by MCA Inc. until 1992 when Geffen Records (bought by MCA in 1990) released the Guns N' Roses song "The Garden" from Use Your Illusion I as a single, Cooper being a guest on that track.
