= DaDa =

Studio album by Alice Cooper
- Released: September 28, 1983 (US); November 4, 1983 (UK)
- Recorded: Mid-1983
- Studios: Phase One (Toronto); ESP (Buttonville)
- Genres: New wave; art rock
- Length: 42:15
- Label: Warner Bros.
- Producer: Bob Ezrin

Alice Cooper chronology
Toronto Rock 'n' Roll Revival 1969, Volume IV (1982)	DaDa (1983)	Constrictor (1986)

Singles from DaDa
- 1. "I Love America" Released: November 18, 1983 (UK)

DaDa is the eighth solo and overall fifteenth studio album by American rock singer Alice Cooper, released on September 28, 1983, by Warner Bros. Records. DaDa would be Cooper's final studio album until his sober re-emergence in 1986 with the hard rock album Constrictor.

== Background and recording ==
DaDa was produced by long-time collaborator Bob Ezrin, at the time his first production with Cooper in six years since his third solo studio album Lace and Whiskey (1977), during that interim Ezrin had produced Pink Floyd's studio album The Wall (1979), with people comparing the sound of certain tracks on DaDa to Pink Floyd. The guitar solo on "Pass the Gun Around" was compared to David Gilmour's playing style.

The album was recorded during mid-1983 at Phase One Studios in Toronto and ESP Studios in Buttonville, Canada, and made use of local musicians with contributions from Juno Award-winning vocalist and keyboardist Graham Shaw, bassist Prakash John and vocalist Lisa Dal Bello, who would soon be known by her stage name Dalbello. A mostly synthesizer-focused album, it made extensive use of the then-new digital sampling synthesizer, the Fairlight CMI.

Guitarist and co-songwriter Dick Wagner revealed in 2014 that Cooper had relapsed to drinking heavily during the recording of DaDa, and had suggested that the album was a contract fulfillment requirement for which Warner Bros. was not pleased and consequently made no effort to promote, though Warner Bros. has never confirmed or denied this. This and other details, like the real-life cocktail waitresses that inspired "Scarlet and Sheba" are in his autobiography Not Only Women Bleed (2011).

DaDa is the final of three albums in which Cooper refers to as his "blackout" albums, the others being preceding studio albums Special Forces (1981) and Zipper Catches Skin (1982), due to substance abuse. Cooper stated "I wrote them, recorded them and toured them and I don't remember much of any of that", though he toured only Special Forces, the tour for which ended in February 1982.

In 1996, Cooper said that DaDa was the scariest album he ever made, and that he never had any idea what it was about. There was no tour to promote DaDa, and none of its songs have ever been played live.

== Artwork and packaging ==
The front cover for DaDa was based on a painting by Spanish surrealist artist Salvador Dalí titled Slave Market with the Disappearing Bust of Voltaire (1940). The back cover features a photograph of a young Cooper holding a dog with a separate photograph of an old man next to it.

It was designed by Ernie Cefalu's agency Pacific Eye & Ear, who had designed previous albums by both Alice Cooper the band, and Alice Cooper solo.

== Release and legacy ==
DaDa failed to chart on the US Billboard 200, marking a continued commercial downturn for Alice Cooper in his home country. However, the album achieved modest success in the UK, where it peaked at No. 93. According to a Warner Bros. press release issued at the time, "Dyslexia" was intended to serve as the album's lead single. Despite this designation, no single was ultimately released from DaDa in the US. Instead, "I Love America" was issued as a single exclusively in the UK shortly after the album's release there, though it failed to chart.

Interestingly, also in 1983, Warner Home Video re-released Alice Cooper: The Nightmare, the 1975 television special, on VHS and Betamax formats. Despite the limited promotion for DaDa, the release of The Nightmare attracted significant attention and earned a Grammy nomination for Best Long Form Music Video at the 26th Annual Grammy Awards in 1984.

Although DaDa was Cooper's final studio album for Warner Bros., followed by a three-year gap between albums, it did not signal a full retreat from music. Cooper stayed active — getting sober in 1983, presenting at the 1984 Grammy Awards, filming Monster Dog, collaborating on songwriting with Joe Perry of Aerosmith, Andy McCoy of Hanoi Rocks, and Kane Roberts who later became the lead guitarist for Cooper, also recording with Twisted Sister in 1985. During this time, he also focused on his health and family — navigating divorce proceedings in late 1983 before reconciling with his wife and relocating to Chicago, Illinois in 1984, where their son Dashiell was born the following year, and developing a deep, lasting passion for golf. Occasional public appearances continued, including attending the 1984 MTV Video Music Awards and the 1985 premiere of the adventure comedy film Pee-wee's Big Adventure, directed by Tim Burton in his feature-film directorial debut.

== Influence ==
DaDa is cited as the main inspiration behind the birth of the Italian gothic and shock rock band the Mugshots, the first ever European band produced by Dick Wagner, who is also featured on Love, Lust and Revenge. That extended play (EP) contains the first cover version ever recorded of "Pass the Gun Around", a live favourite for the Mugshots.

== Critical reception ==
Professional ratings
Review scores
Source	Rating
AllMusic	3.5/5 stars

In a retrospective review for AllMusic, critic Gary Hill wrote that "As Alice Cooper albums go, this one is really far above average." Adding that "This album is a rather varied release, showcasing several sides of Cooper's musical tastes, but it is all very entertaining. If you missed it when it first came around, do yourself a favor and give it a try now."

== Track listing ==
Side one
No.	Title	Writer(s)	Length
1.	"DaDa"	Bob Ezrin	4:45
2.	"Enough's Enough"	Alice Cooper; Dick Wagner; Graham Shaw; Ezrin	4:19
3.	"Former Lee Warmer"	Cooper; Wagner; Ezrin	4:07
4.	"No Man's Land"	Cooper; Wagner; Ezrin	3:51
5.	"Dyslexia"	Cooper; Wagner; Shaw; Ezrin	4:25

Side two
No.	Title	Writer(s)	Length
6.	"Scarlet and Sheba"	Cooper; Wagner; Ezrin	5:18
7.	"I Love America"	Cooper; Wagner; Shaw; Ezrin	3:50
8.	"Fresh Blood"	Cooper; Wagner; Ezrin	5:54
9.	"Pass the Gun Around"	Cooper; Wagner	5:46
Total length:			42:15

== Personnel ==
Credits are adapted from the DaDa liner notes.

Musicians

- Alice Cooper – vocals
- Dick Wagner – guitar; bass guitar; backing vocals
- Graham Shaw – Oberheim OB-X; Roland Jupiter; backing vocals
- Bob Ezrin – Fairlight CMI programming; keyboards; drums; percussion
- Richard Kolinka – drums ("Scarlet and Sheba", "Former Lee Warmer", "Pass the Gun Around")
- John Anderson – drums ("Fresh Blood")
- Prakash John – bass guitar ("Fresh Blood")
- Karen Hendricks – backing vocals
- Lisa DalBello – backing vocals
- Sarah Ezrin – vocals ("DaDa")

== Production ==
- Shep Gordon: Executive Producer
- Produced by Bob Ezrin; associate producers: Dick Wagner and Robert (Ringo) Hrycyna
- Recording and mix by Bob Ezrin
- Track 1 copyright Under-Cut Co. Inc. Tracks 2 and 5 copyright Ezra Music Inc./Mystery Man Music/Rightsong Inc. /G. Shaw Music Publishing Ltd./Under-Cut Co. Inc. Tracks 3, 4, 6 and 8 copyright Ezra Music Inc./Mystery Man Music/Rightsong Inc./Under-Cut Co. Inc. Track 7 copyright Ezra Music Inc./G. Shaw Music Publishing Ltd. Track 9 copyright Ezra Music Inc./Mystery Man Music/Rightsong Inc.

== Charts ==
Chart (1983)	Peak position
UK Albums (Official Charts)	93
