= Special Forces (Alice Cooper album) =

Studio album by Alice Cooper
- Released: September 1, 1981
- Studio: American Recording Co. (Studio City, California)
- Genre: Hard rock; punk rock; new wave
- Length: 34:51
- Label: Warner Bros.
- Producer: Richard Podolor

Alice Cooper chronology
Flush the Fashion (1980)	Special Forces (1981)	Zipper Catches Skin (1982)

Singles from Special Forces
- 1. "You Want It, You Got It" Released: July 1981; 2. "Seven and Seven Is" Released: October 1981

Special Forces is the sixth solo and overall thirteenth studio album by American rock singer Alice Cooper, released on September 1, 1981 by Warner Bros. Records. It was produced by Richard Podolor, best known for his work with Three Dog Night, at his American Recording Co. studio in the Studio City neighborhood of Los Angeles, California.

Special Forces is the first of three studio albums which Cooper refers to as his "blackout" albums, followed by Zipper Catches Skin (1982), and DaDa (1983), as he has no recollection of recording them, due to substance abuse. Cooper stated "I wrote them, recorded them and toured them and I don't remember much of any of that", though in fact, he toured to promote only Special Forces.

The Special Forces tour started on June 20, 1981 in Concord, California, well before the album was eventually released. On October 9, Alice Cooper was interviewed on The Tomorrow Show with Tom Snyder, looking very gaunt in full military-drag make-up, after which he gave live performances of "Who Do You Think We Are" and his cover version of Love's "Seven and Seven Is", both from the album. Cooper toured Special Forces through the United States, Canada, France, Spain and the United Kingdom, but other than the aforementioned songs he played no further Special Forces songs live, except for snippets of "Vicious Rumours" at a few shows in the U.S. and Scotland. With the exception of "Who Do You Think We Are", which was a regular part of setlists during the Eyes of Alice Cooper tour in 2004, none of the songs from Special Forces has been performed live since 1982.

French television special Alice Cooper a Paris was recorded in December 1981 and aired on January 14, before the start of the Special Forces European tour – Cooper's first tour of Europe since 1975. The tour was a major success.

The Special Forces tour, ending in February 1982, would be Cooper's last for over four years, as he succumbed to the abuse of freebase cocaine and a subsequent relapse of alcoholism, until his return to the road in October 1986 with The Nightmare Returns tour.

== Critical reception ==
Professional ratings
Review scores
Source	Rating
AllMusic	3/5 stars
The Rolling Stone Album Guide	1/5 stars

In a review for AllMusic, critic Greg Prato wrote: "1981's 'Special Forces' was Cooper's most stripped-down and straightforward since his classic early-'70s work. But without the original Cooper band to back him up and help out with the songwriting, it's an intriguing yet sometimes uneven set." Cooper was heavily into the guns and ammo publication Soldier of Fortune at the time; hence the album title and lyrical subject matter. The opening track, 'Who Do You Think We Are,' is one of Cooper's punchiest rockers, and one of his most overlooked, while 'Seven & Seven Is,' 'You Look Good in Rags,' and 'Vicious Rumours' are also rocking highlights. A faithful rereading of the Billion Dollar Babies nugget 'Generation Landslide' is included as well, titled 'Generation Landslide '81 (Live),' even though it was, in fact, entirely created in the studio (with added audience cheers). While Special Forces didn't return Cooper to his earlier status as a chart-topping superstar, it is certainly one of the strongest and most interesting releases of his post-1975 period."

== Track listing ==
Side one
No.	Title	Writer(s)	Length
1.	"Who Do You Think We Are"	Alice Cooper; Duane Hitchings	4:21
2.	"Seven and Seven Is"	Arthur Lee	2:41
3.	"Prettiest Cop on the Block"	Cooper; Davey Johnstone; Fred Mandel	3:13
4.	"Don't Talk Old to Me"	Cooper; Johnstone; Mandel	2:54
5.	"Generation Landslide '81" (live)	Cooper; Glen Buxton; Michael Bruce; Dennis Dunaway; Neal Smith	3:50

Side two
No.	Title	Writer(s)	Length
6.	"Skeletons in the Closet"	Cooper; Hitchings	3:42
7.	"You Want It, You Got It"	Cooper; Erik Scott; Craig Krampf; Billy Steele; Eric Kaz	3:15
8.	"You Look Good in Rags"	Cooper; Hitchings	3:35
9.	"You're a Movie"	Cooper; Hitchings	3:37
10.	"Vicious Rumours"	Cooper; Hitchings; Scott; Mike Pinera	3:43
Total length:			34:51

- "Look at You Over There, Ripping the Sawdust from My Teddybear", was listed on the album packaging, but was removed by Cooper from the album itself before the release, as he felt it didn't fit with the overall theme. It was later released in demo form on the 4-CD box set The Life and Crimes of Alice Cooper (1999). There is a completed studio version of the song which remains unreleased.
- "Seven and Seven Is" is a cover version of Love's 1966 original, written by Arthur Lee.

== Personnel ==
Credits are adapted from the Special Forces liner notes.

Musicians

- Alice Cooper – vocals
- Duane Hitchings – keyboards
- Danny Johnson – guitar
- Craig Krampf – drums
- Mike Pinera – guitar
- Erik Scott – bass guitar

== Charts ==
Chart (1981)	Peak position
Australian Albums (Kent Music Report)	76
UK Albums (OCC)	96
US Billboard 200	125
