= Hello Hooray =

1968 song recorded by Judy Collins

"Hello Hooray" is a song written by Canadian singer-songwriter Rolf Kempf, and first recorded by Judy Collins on her seventh studio album Who Knows Where the Time Goes (1968).

== Alice Cooper version ==
"Hello Hurray"

Single by Alice Cooper

from the album Billion Dollar Babies
- B-side: "Generation Landslide"
- Released: January 3, 1973
- Genre: Hard rock; glam rock
- Length: 4:15 (Album Version); 3:01 (Single Version, stereo and mono pressings)
- Label: Warner Bros.
- Songwriter: Rolf Kempf
- Producer: Bob Ezrin

Alice Cooper singles chronology
"Elected" (1972)	"Hello Hurray" (1973)	"No More Mr. Nice Guy" (1973)

The song was covered by American rock band Alice Cooper on their sixth album Billion Dollar Babies. It was released as a single, reaching #35 on the Billboard Hot 100, #6 on the UK singles chart, #6 in the Netherlands on the MegaCharts, #13 on Germany's Media Control Chart, #14 on the Ireland chart, #16 on the Austria chart, and #95 on Australia's ARIA chart. Some pressings of the single were alternatively spelled “Hello Hurray," likely due to a typographical error during production. This spelling mistake also appeared on some promotional materials and some reissues.

=== Composition ===
Kempf began writing “Hello, Hooray”, a folk song, while sitting near a swimming pool. A few days later, he gave it to Judy Collins. The lyrics pay tribute to the joy a singer feels when performing for an audience. Alice Cooper adds a "hard rock bombast" to the song, but otherwise plays it straight.

=== Reception ===
Record World said of it that "Alice departs from its usual high energy with this slower tune written by Rolf Kempf."

=== Track listing ===
No.	Title	Writer(s)	Length
1.	"Hello Hurray"	Rolf Kempf	3:01
2.	"Generation Landslide"	Alice Cooper, Michael Bruce, Dennis Dunaway, Neal Smith, Glen Buxton	3:58

=== Personnel ===
- Alice Cooper – vocals
- Glen Buxton – lead guitar
- Michael Bruce – rhythm guitar
- Dennis Dunaway – bass
- Neal Smith – drums

== Other versions ==
- Meg Christian released a version of the song on her 1974 album, I Know You Know.
- Pig released a version on his 1992 album, A Stroll in the Pork.
- Frankenstein Drag Queens from Planet 13 released a version on their 2006 box set, Little Box of Horrors.
