= Raise Your Fist and Yell =

Studio album by Alice Cooper
- Released: September 5, 1987
- Recorded: 1987
- Genres: Heavy metal; hard rock; glam metal
- Length: 36:53
- Label: MCA
- Producer: Michael Wagener

Alice Cooper chronology
Constrictor (1986)	Raise Your Fist and Yell (1987)	Trash (1989)

Singles from Raise Your Fist and Yell
- 1. "Freedom" Released: November 1987

Professional ratings
Review scores
Source	Rating
AllMusic	2.5/5 stars
NME	5/10

Raise Your Fist and Yell is the tenth solo and overall seventeenth studio album by American rock singer Alice Cooper, released on September 5, 1987, by MCA Records. It features the track "Prince of Darkness", which is featured very briefly in the John Carpenter film of the same name, in which Cooper has a cameo appearance as a murderous vagrant. The song can be heard on the Walkman of one of his victims. A music video was made for the song "Freedom", which also became the album's sole single. Raise Your Fist and Yell is the only Alice Cooper album to feature Ken K. Mary on drums and the second and last to feature Kip Winger on bass.

The album continues the slasher film trend created by Cooper's previous album Constrictor. The track "Lock Me Up" features a guest appearance from Robert Englund, who portrayed Freddy Krueger in the A Nightmare on Elm Street series.

The album cover for Raise Your Fist and Yell was painted by artist Jim Warren.

== Tour ==
The infamous tour for the album, dubbed "Live in the Flesh", was notorious in Europe in 1988 for its graphic violence and theatricality. The show included many of Cooper's old favourites, such as the gallows (for the first time since 1972), but offered new theatrics such as impaling a person with a microphone stand. (This was also seen in John Carpenter's Prince of Darkness, used by Cooper in a cameo role as a vagrant who kills one of the characters with the front forks of a bicycle.) Most of the tour's more violent acts were heavily inspired by the horror movies of the time, by including graphic onstage deaths and large amounts of stage blood. Cooper has been said to be a big fan of these movies.

The show was seen to be so violent that the German government forced Cooper to remove some of the more graphic parts of the show. A (blind) Member of Parliament in the UK, David Blunkett, appealed to have the show banned altogether from the country, but his attempt was unsuccessful.

=== Live performances ===
Five songs from Raise Your Fist and Yell were played by Cooper during the album's supporting tour: "Freedom", "Prince of Darkness", "Chop Chop Chop", "Gail" and "Roses on White Lace". "Roses on White Lace" was revived as a regular part of setlists for the 2019 "Ol' Black Eyes Is Back" tour, and "Freedom" was part of the finale for several shows in late 2022 and early 2023 when Kane Roberts returned to the band for a while. "Lock Me Up" has been used to open shows since 2023. Other than those, nothing from "Raise Your Fist and Yell" album has returned to the setlist.

== Track listing ==
All tracks are written by Alice Cooper and Kane Roberts except where noted.

Side one
No.	Title	Length
1.	"Freedom"	4:09
2.	"Lock Me Up"	3:24
3.	"Give the Radio Back"	3:34
4.	"Step on You"	3:39
5.	"Not That Kind of Love"	3:15

Side two
No.	Title	Writer(s)	Length
6.	"Prince of Darkness"		5:10
7.	"Time to Kill"		3:39
8.	"Chop, Chop, Chop"		3:06
9.	"Gail"	Cooper, Roberts, Winger	2:30
10.	"Roses on White Lace"		4:27

== Personnel ==
- Alice Cooper – vocals
- Kane Roberts – guitar, backing vocals
- Kip Winger – bass, backing vocals, keyboards on "Gail"
- Paul Taylor – keyboards
- Ken K. Mary – drums

Additional personnel

- Robert Englund – Freddy Krueger on "Lock Me Up"

== Charts ==
Chart (1986)	Peak position
Canada Top Albums/CDs (RPM)	66
Finnish Albums (Suomen virallinen lista)	36
Swedish Albums (Sverigetopplistan)	15
UK Albums (Official Charts)	48
US Billboard 200	73

== Certifications ==
Region	Certification	Certified units/sales
Canada (Music Canada)	Gold	50,000^{^}
^{^} Shipments figures based on certification alone.
