= Billion Dollar Babies =

Studio album by Alice Cooper
- Released: February 27, 1973
- Recorded: August 1972 – January 1973
- Studios: Galesi Estate (Greenwich, Connecticut); Record Plant (New York City); Morgan (London)
- Genres: Hard rock; glam rock; shock rock
- Length: 40:51
- Label: Warner Bros.
- Producer: Bob Ezrin

Alice Cooper chronology
School's Out (1972)	Billion Dollar Babies (1973)	School Days: The Early Recordings (1973)

Singles from Billion Dollar Babies
- 1. "Elected" Released: September 6, 1972; 2. "Hello Hooray" Released: January 3, 1973; 3. "No More Mr. Nice Guy" Released: March 16, 1973; 4. "Billion Dollar Babies" Released: July 11, 1973

Billion Dollar Babies is the sixth studio album by American rock band Alice Cooper, released on February 27, 1973. The album became the best selling Alice Cooper record at the time of its release, hitting number one on the album charts in the United States and the United Kingdom, and was certified platinum by the Recording Industry Association of America.

The album has been retrospectively praised by such critics as Robert Christgau, Greg Prato of AllMusic, and Jason Thompson of PopMatters, but The Rolling Stone Album Guide (2004) gave the album only two and a half stars.

Songs were recorded in both the state of Connecticut and London, England. Lyrics cover topics and themes such as necrophilia, dental fear, horror, and sexual harassment.

== Recording and production ==
Drummer Neal Smith has said that the album can be traced back to the song "Caught in a Dream" from the album Love It to Death (1971). The first recording sessions for the album took place in Greenwich, Connecticut, in a mansion called the Galesi Estate. To achieve certain vocal sounds and echoes, microphones were run through rooms of various sizes and through a greenhouse. Other sessions were held at Morgan Studios in London, where singer Donovan contributed to the album by singing on its title track. The album was produced by Bob Ezrin with Gerry Lyon as assistant in New York, Connecticut and London.

Guitarists Glen Buxton and Michael Bruce both used Gibson SGs for the album. Three additional guitarists (including longtime band friend Mick Mashbir and New York-based session musicians Dick Wagner and Steve Hunter) were retained to cover for Buxton, who suffered from alcohol abuse-related pancreatitis throughout the sessions.

A quadraphonic mix of the album was released on both 8-track and reel-to-reel format, as well as vinyl. This features radically different mixes of all of the songs, including different vocal tracks ("Raped and Freezin'"), unfaded endings ("Generation Landslide"), and editing ("I Love the Dead"). Alice's lead vocals are more upfront in the quad mix than the stereo mix. Rumors that this mix of the album can be found on the DVD-Audio release are untrue. The DVD-Audio release contains a newer 5.1 channel mix of the album, based on the original 2-channel tracks as opposed to the quad mix. In June 2023 Rhino released a Blu-ray with the quadraphonic and stereo mixes.

== Lyrical themes and subjects ==
The album's title comes from the fact that the five members of Alice Cooper were surprised about their success. Cooper related: "How could we, this band that two years ago was living in the Chambers Brothers' basement in Watts, be the Number One band in the world, with people throwing money at us?" The title was also later used as the name of the group Neal Smith, Dennis Dunaway, and Michael Bruce formed after Alice Cooper group had split up. Cooper said, "The whole idea behind the Billion Dollar Babies album was exploiting the idea that people do have sick perversions."

Alice Cooper, who wrote the majority of the album's lyrics, cited Chuck Berry as a key influence on his writing. "Hello Hooray", the album's opening track, was written by Canadian singer/songwriter Rolf Kempf and was previously recorded by Judy Collins. The band wanted their version of the song to sound like "Alice Cooper meets Cabaret". The album's third track, "Elected", is a rewrite of the song "Reflected" from Pretties for You (1969). "Raped and Freezin'" has been called a "hilarious and gorgeously catchy" take on the idea of sexual harassment by PopMatters's Jason Thompson. "Unfinished Sweet" is about visiting a dentist with sound effects recorded by Gerry Lyon. The title track was co-written by Reggie Vinson (credited on original pressings of the album as "R. Reggie", i.e., "Rockin' Reggie Vinson"), who had played guitar on and performed vocals for School's Out (1972). Donovan described the song as a "horror story song". The album's closing track, "I Love the Dead", is a tongue-in-cheek song about necrophilia.

== Touring ==
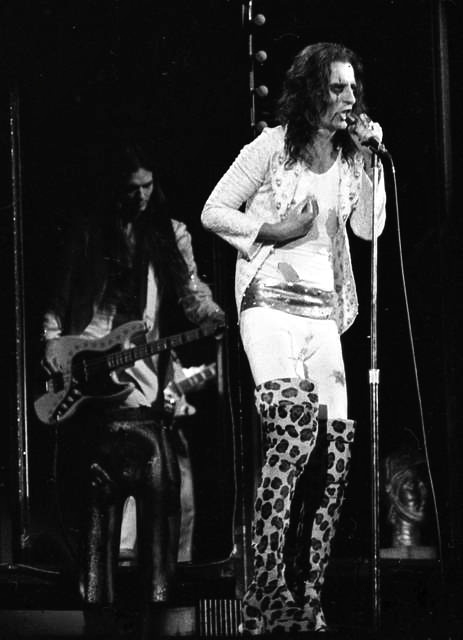
Alice Cooper and Dennis Dunaway performing live during the Billion Dollar Babies tour

After the album was released, the band embarked on a tour which broke the United States box office records previously held by the Rolling Stones and included a scheduled 64 concerts in 59 cities in 90 days. The gross revenue of the tour was anticipated to be close to $20 million, but only about $4 million was achieved.

Cooper hired magician James Randi to design effects for the show, and Randi traveled with the tour to supervise and coordinate the effects. Randi even played a role in the stage show as "The Executioner".

The live performances featured Cooper wearing a costume with fake blood stains at the crotch, tearing apart baby dolls, attacking mannequins, and being decapitated by a guillotine. Cooper has said that the mutilation of the dolls symbolized child neglect. Between 40 and 50 people were employed and 26,000 pounds of equipment were used. In preparation for the tour, two semi-trailer trucks carried a wide variety of props including a dentist's drill, four whips, a surgical table, six hatchets, 33,000 program books, 300 baby dolls, 22,000 sparklers, 58 mannequins, 280 spare light bulbs, 1,000 patches, 6,000 mirror parts, 14 bubble machines, 28 gallons of bubble juice, and 250,000 packages of bubble bath.

== Critical reception and influence ==
Professional ratings
Review scores
Source	Rating
AllMusic	5/5 stars
Christgau's Record Guide	B
Creem	B+
The Rolling Stone Album Guide	2.5/5 stars

Billion Dollar Babies was commercially more successful than Alice Cooper's previous albums; it went to No. 1 in both the United Kingdom and United States. The album's singles "Elected", "Hello Hooray", "Billion Dollar Babies", and "No More Mr. Nice Guy", all became hits on the Billboard Hot 100. In March 1973 the album was certified gold by the Recording Industry Association of America and in 1986, it went platinum.

In a contemporary review for Creem magazine, Robert Christgau said that Billion Dollar Babies is Cooper's "most consistent album", even though it lacks a song as strong as "School's Out". In a retrospective review, AllMusic's Greg Prato awarded the album four and a half out of five stars and called it "one of Cooper's very best; it remains one of rock's all-time, quintessential classics". Jason Thompson of PopMatters praised the album, saying it was "arguably the original Alice Cooper Group's best album". However, the 2004 The Rolling Stone Album Guide was less positive about the album, giving it two and a half stars and criticizing songs like "I Love the Dead" for being "predictable". Daniel Bukszpan, the author of The Encyclopedia of Heavy Metal, called it a "classic" and "arguably the original band's finest offering". In 2005, Billion Dollar Babies was ranked number 283 in Rock Hard magazine's book of The 500 Greatest Rock & Metal Albums of All Time. The album was also included in the book 1001 Albums You Must Hear Before You Die. Treble named it in its list "10 Essential Glam Rock Albums".

Chris Cornell of Soundgarden stated that it was one of his favorite records. In an interview with Spin magazine in 1989, he commented that: "When I was in junior high, every Friday the teachers would let the kids play their favorite records. I brought in Billion Dollar Babies [Alice Cooper, 1973] and they wouldn't let me play it. They never vetoed anyone's choice before. It was then I knew that rock'n'roll could scare the fuck out of certain people." The Norwegian band Turbonegro made a song called "Zillion Dollar Sadist" as a tribute to Billion Dollar Babies. David Byrne of Talking Heads has said that the album inspired him to write the song, "Psycho Killer". The Swiss extreme metal group Samael did a cover of the song "I Love the Dead" on their Rebellion EP. Italian heavy metal band Death SS covered the song "I Love the Dead" on their debut album, ...in Death of Steve Sylvester (1988).

Billion Dollar Babies is the second most-represented album in Alice Cooper's live sets, behind only Welcome to My Nightmare (1975). The only song from the album that has never been played live in any form is the short "Mary Ann", although "Generation Landslide" was not played until the tour eight years later following Special Forces (1981), on which it had been re-recorded.

== Track listing ==
=== LP ===
Side one
No.	Title	Writer(s)	Length
1.	"Hello Hooray"	Rolf Kempf	4:15
2.	"Raped and Freezin'"	Alice Cooper; Michael Bruce	3:19
3.	"Elected"	Cooper; Bruce; Glen Buxton; Dennis Dunaway; Neal Smith	4:05
4.	"Billion Dollar Babies"	Cooper; Bruce; Reggie Vinson	3:43
5.	"Unfinished Sweet"	Cooper; Bruce; Smith	6:18

Side two
No.	Title	Writer(s)	Length
6.	"No More Mr. Nice Guy"	Bruce; Cooper	3:06
7.	"Generation Landslide"	Cooper; Bruce; Dunaway; Smith; Buxton	4:31
8.	"Sick Things"	Bruce; Cooper; Bob Ezrin	4:18
9.	"Mary Ann"	Bruce; Cooper	2:21
10.	"I Love the Dead"	Ezrin; Cooper	5:09
Total length:			40:51

=== Deluxe Edition CD bonus tracks ===
The 2001 CD reissue includes these additional tracks on a second disc:

No.	Title	Music	Length
1.	"Hello Hooray" (Live)	Kempf	3:04
2.	"Billion Dollar Babies" (Live)	Bruce; Cooper; Vinson	3:47
3.	"Elected" (Live)	Bruce; Buxton; Cooper; Dunaway; Smith	2:28
4.	"I'm Eighteen" (Live)	Bruce; Buxton; Cooper; Dunaway; Smith	4:50
5.	"Raped and Freezin'" (Live)	Bruce; Cooper	3:14
6.	"No More Mr. Nice Guy" (Live)	Bruce; Cooper	3:07
7.	"My Stars" (Live)	Cooper; Ezrin	7:32
8.	"Unfinished Sweet" (Live)	Bruce; Cooper; Smith	6:01
9.	"Sick Things" (Live)	Bruce; Cooper; Ezrin	3:16
10.	"Dead Babies" (Live)	Bruce; Buxton; Cooper; Dunaway; Smith	2:58
11.	"I Love the Dead" (Live)	Cooper; Ezrin	4:48
12.	"Coal Black Model T" (outtake of "Slick Black Limousine")	Cooper; Dunaway	4:28
13.	"Son of Billion Dollar Babies" (outtake of "Generation Landslide")	Bruce; Buxton; Cooper; Dunaway; Smith	3:45
14.	"Slick Black Limousine"	Cooper; Dunaway	4:26

== Personnel ==
=== Credits ===
Alice Cooper group

- Alice Cooper – lead vocals, harmonica
- Glen Buxton – lead guitar
- Michael Bruce – rhythm guitar, keyboards, backing vocals
- Dennis Dunaway – bass, backing vocals
- Neal Smith – drums, backing vocals

with:

- Donovan – vocals on "Billion Dollar Babies"
- Steve "The Deacon" Hunter – guitar solos on "Generation Landslide", "Billion Dollar Babies", "Sick Things", "Raped and Freezing" and "Unfinished Sweet"; pedal steel guitar on "Hello Hooray"
- Mick Mashbir – guitars
- Dick Wagner – guitars
- Bob Dolin – keyboards
- Bob Ezrin – keyboards
- Allan Macmillan – piano on Mary Ann
- David Libert – backing vocals

Technical

- Bob Ezrin – production
- Jack Douglas – engineering
- Robin Black – engineering
- Frank Hubach – engineering
- Ed Sprigg – engineering
- Logan Jervis – engineering
- Shelly Yakus – engineering
- Peter Flanagan – engineering
- Brian Kehew – editing, remixing
- George Marino – mastering engineering
- Pacific Eye & Ear – design
- E.A.R. – design, concept
- Greg Allen – art direction, design
- Hugh Brown – art direction
- David P. Bailey – photography, cover photo
- Neal Preston – photography
- Lynn Goldsmith – photography
- Jo Motta – project coordinator
- Steve Woolard – project coordinator
- Randy Perry – project assistant
- Vanessa Atkins – editorial supervision
- Norma Edwards – editorial research
- Shawn Amos – editorial coordinator
- Brian Smith – liner notes

== Charts ==
=== Weekly charts ===
Chart (1973–1974)	Peak position
Australian Albums (Kent Music Report)	4
Austrian Albums (Ö3 Austria)	4
Canada Top Albums/CDs (RPM)	2
Dutch Albums (Album Top 100)	1
Finnish Albums (The Official Finnish Charts)	1
German Albums (Offizielle Top 100)	9
Norwegian Albums (VG-lista)	6
US Billboard 200	1
UK Albums (Official Charts)	1

Chart (2024)	Peak position
Belgian Albums (Ultratop Wallonia)	174
Hungarian Physical Albums (MAHASZ)	12
Scottish Albums (Official Charts)	13

=== Year-end charts ===
Chart (1973)	Position
German Albums (Offizielle Top 100)	26

== Certifications ==
Region	Certification	Certified units/sales
Australia (ARIA)	Gold	35,000^{^}
Canada (Music Canada)	Gold	50,000^{^}
United States (RIAA)	Platinum	1,000,000^{^}
^{^} Shipments figures based on certification alone.
