= Constrictor (album) =

1986 studio album by Alice Cooper

Studio album by Alice Cooper
- Released: September 22, 1986
- Recorded: 1985–1986
- Genres: Hard rock; glam metal
- Length: 37:07
- Label: MCA
- Producers: Beau Hill; Michael Wagener

Alice Cooper chronology
DaDa (1983)	Constrictor (1986)	Raise Your Fist and Yell (1987)

Singles from Constrictor
- 1. "He's Back (The Man Behind the Mask)" Released: August 1986; 2. "Give It Up" Released: 1986; 3. "Teenage Frankenstein" Released: March 1987

Professional ratings
Review scores
Source	Rating
AllMusic	3/5 stars
(The New) Rolling Stone Album Guide	1/5 stars

Constrictor is the ninth solo and overall sixteenth studio album by American rock singer Alice Cooper, released on September 22, 1986. It was his first album since DaDa in 1983. The album reached No. 59 on the Billboard 200.

== Production ==
Constrictor was Cooper's first studio album to feature Kane Roberts on guitar, Kip Winger on bass, and the only one to feature David Rosenberg on drums. Winger has since pointed out that his name was erroneously spelled in the album credits as Wringer.

The album was partly recorded in Los Angeles, a city Cooper had left in the wake of his Hollywood-abetted alcoholism. "It's fun to plug into LA now rather than being there," he remarked. "Everybody says, 'Oh, you look really healthy.' That's not necessarily a compliment when you're trying to be Alice Cooper."

"He's Back (The Man Behind the Mask)" was written for Friday the 13th Part VI: Jason Lives (1986) and reached No. 4 in Sweden in 1987. Also featured in the film were Constrictor's "Teenage Frankenstein" and "Hard Rock Summer", the latter of which did not end up on the album. The demo of "He's Back (The Man Behind the Mask)" is different from final album version. A reworked version of the "He's Back" demo landed on the album as "Trick Bag" instead. The version of "He's Back" featured in Friday the 13th Part VI: Jason Lives was remixed from the album version.

== Live performances ==
Cooper's "The Nightmare Returns" tour followed the release of the album. Three songs from the album, "Teenage Frankenstein", "Give It Up" and "The World Needs Guts" were regularly performed on the tour. However, as with all Cooper live songs since his third solo studio album Lace and Whiskey (1977), these songs failed to remain in the setlist during subsequent tours. "Teenage Frankenstein" was also played on the tour supporting the follow-up studio album Raise Your Fist and Yell and occasionally during the 2001 "Descent into Dragontown" tour and during the 2019 "Ol' Black Eyes Is Back" tour, whilst "He's Back (The Man Behind the Mask)" was played occasionally in the late 1980s and the early 2000s before becoming a frequent part of the setlist on the "Raise the Dead" tour. The song was resurrected alongside Teenage Frankenstein during the "Ol' Black Eyes Is Back" tour; the song was not played during the American leg and a portion of the European leg.

== Track listing ==
All tracks are written by Alice Cooper and Kane Roberts, except where noted.

Side one
No.	Title	Length
1.	"Teenage Frankenstein"	3:40
2.	"Give It Up"	4:13
3.	"Thrill My Gorilla"	2:56
4.	"Life and Death of the Party"	3:45
5.	"Simple Disobedience"	3:30

Side two
No.	Title	Writer(s)	Length
6.	"The World Needs Guts"		3:59
7.	"Trick Bag"	Cooper; Roberts; Tom Kelly	4:18
8.	"Crawlin'"	Cooper; Roberts; Michael Wagener	3:22
9.	"The Great American Success Story"	Cooper; Roberts; Beau Hill	3:38
10.	"He's Back (The Man Behind the Mask)"	Cooper; Roberts; Kelly	3:49
Total length:			37:07

== Personnel ==
Musicians

- Alice Cooper – lead vocals
- Kane Roberts – guitars, bass, keyboards, drums, backing vocals
- Kip Winger – bass, backing vocals
- David Rosenberg – drums
- Donnie Kisselbach – bass
- Paul Delph – keyboards, backing vocals on "He's Back"
- Tom Kelly – backing vocals on "He's Back"
- Beau Hill – backing vocals

Technical

- Beau Hill – production
- Michael Wagener – production, mixing
- Stephen Benben – engineering
- Ira McLaughlin – assistant engineering
- Garth Richardson – assistant mixing
- Mike Reese – mastering
- Anita Bourne – production coordination

== Charts ==
Chart (1986)	Peak position
Australian Albums (Kent Music Report)	94
Finnish Albums (Suomen virallinen lista)	21
Swedish Albums (Sverigetopplistan)	17
UK Albums (Official Charts)	41
US Billboard 200	59

== Certifications ==
Certifications for Constrictor
Region	Certification	Certified units/sales
Canada (Music Canada)	Gold	50,000^{^}
^{^} Shipments figures based on certification alone.
