= Flush the Fashion =

Studio album by Alice Cooper
- Released: April 28, 1980
- Recorded: February-March 1980
- Studio: Cherokee (Hollywood)
- Genres: Rock; hard rock; new wave
- Length: 28:34
- Label: Warner Bros.
- Producer: Roy Thomas Baker

Alice Cooper chronology
From the Inside (1978)	Flush the Fashion (1980)	Special Forces (1981)

Singles from Flush the Fashion
- 1. "Clones (We're All)" Released: April 1980; 2. "Talk Talk" Released: September 1980

Flush the Fashion is the fifth solo and overall twelfth studio album by American singer Alice Cooper, released on April 28, 1980, by Warner Bros. Records. It was recorded at Cherokee Studios in Los Angeles with producer Roy Thomas Baker, known for his work with Queen and the Cars. Musically, the album was a drastic change of style for Cooper, leaning towards a new wave influence. The lead single, "Clones (We're All)", reached number 40 on the US Billboard Hot 100, helping Flush the Fashion peak at number 44 on the Billboard 200 album chart, making it Cooper's highest-charting release since 1977's Lace and Whiskey. Clocking in at just 28 minutes, Flush the Fashion has the shortest running time of any of Cooper's albums.

== Background ==
The album's ten tracks touch on themes such as the loss of identity, taking on other roles, and the usual Alice Cooper-esque dementia. This is evident even in the lyrics of Flush the Fashion's cover songs (for example the "Clones" single). Cooper also performs several "story" songs, presenting a series of intriguing vignettes in lieu of more traditional subject matter. By the time of Flush the Fashion, after a much-publicized stint in a sanitarium in 1977 for alcoholism and subsequent sobriety, Cooper had secretly developed a heavy addiction to cocaine, although, unlike his subsequent three studio albums, Cooper has some recollection – if not perfect – of making Flush the Fashion.

The cover art is believed to have been created by Cooper himself as a response to learning the budget allocated for the album’s artwork. Upon discovering that approximately $5,000 was to be spent, Cooper reportedly went into the studio bathroom, inscribed the album’s title into the wall of a cubicle with a knife, and instructed Warner Brothers to photograph the inscription for use as the album cover.

Cooper did tour the album through the United States and Mexico City during 1980, playing "Clones (We're All)", "Pain", "Model Citizen", "Grim Facts", "Talk Talk", "Dance Yourself to Death" and "Nuclear Infected" on a regular basis. The first four songs remained part of the setlist for the Special Forces tour a year later. Since 1982, songs from Flush the Fashion, as with all of Cooper's albums from between 1976 and 1983, have rarely been performed live. The only cases have been:

- "Clones (We're All)", of which there were a few irregular performances between 1996 and 2003 and was a regular part of Cooper's setlist during the 2011–2012 'No More Mr. Nice Guy' tour
- "Pain", which was regular on Cooper's 2017 'Spend the Night with Alice Cooper' tour, and
- "Grim Facts", which was part of "A Paranormal Evening with Alice Cooper" tour in 2018.

According to Alice Cooper on his radio show on October 5, 2020, all the song titles on this album were taken from Headlines (hence Track #10) from the National Enquirer.

== Critical reception ==
Professional ratings
Review scores
Source	Rating
AllMusic	2.5/5 stars
The Rolling Stone Album Guide	1/5 stars

The Rolling Stone Album Guide wrote that Cooper "bottomed out ... [with] a half-hearted new-wave makeover."

Classic Rock wrote that "Flush the Fashion is very much of its time, but its one of Coop’s most fun albums, a rollicking collection of herky-jerky skinny-tie robot rock."

== Track listing ==
All tracks are written by Alice Cooper, Davey Johnstone and Fred Mandel except where noted.

Side one
No.	Title	Writer(s)	Length
1.	"Talk Talk"	Sean Bonniwell	2:09
2.	"Clones (We're All)"	David Carron	3:03
3.	"Pain"		4:06
4.	"Leather Boots"	Geoff Westen	1:36
5.	"Aspirin Damage"		2:57

Side two
No.	Title	Writer(s)	Length
1.	"Nuclear Infected"		2:14
2.	"Grim Facts"		3:24
3.	"Model Citizen"		2:39
4.	"Dance Yourself to Death"	Cooper; Frank Crandall	3:08
5.	"Headlines"		3:18
Total length:			28:34

== Personnel ==
Credits are adapted from the Flush the Fashion liner notes.

Musicians

- Alice Cooper – vocals
- Davey Johnstone – lead guitar
- Fred Mandel – keyboards; rhythm guitar; backing vocals
- Dennis Conway – drums
- John Cooker Lopresti – bass guitar
- Flo & Eddie – backing vocals
- Joe Pizzulo – backing vocals
- Keith Allison – backing vocals
- Ricky "Rat" Tierney – backing vocals

Production and artwork

- Roy Thomas Baker – producer
- Ian Taylor – engineer
- John Weaver – assistant engineer
- Eddy Herch – design
- Jonathan Exley – back cover and sleeve photography
- Fred Valentine – front cover photography
- Alice Cooper – art direction
- Peter Whorf – art direction

== Charts ==
Chart (1980)	Peak position
Australian Albums (Kent Music Report)	32
Canada Top Albums/CDs (RPM)	19
New Zealand Albums (RMNZ)	40
Norwegian Albums (VG-lista)	32
Swedish Albums (Sverigetopplistan)	34
UK Albums (Official Charts)	56
US Billboard 200	44
