= Billion Dollar Babies (song) =

- 7" single

Single by Alice Cooper featuring Donovan

from the album Billion Dollar Babies
- B-side: "Mary Ann"
- Released: July 11, 1973
- Recorded: 1972
- Genre: Hard rock; glam rock; shock rock
- Length: 3:43
- Label: Warner Bros.
- Songwriters: Alice Cooper, Michael Bruce, Reggie Vinson
- Producer: Bob Ezrin

Alice Cooper featuring Donovan singles chronology
"No More Mr. Nice Guy" (1973)	"Billion Dollar Babies" (1973)	"Halo of Flies" (1973)

"Billion Dollar Babies" is a song by American rock band Alice Cooper, released in 1973 as the fourth single off their sixth album Billion Dollar Babies. The track is a duet between Alice Cooper and Scottish musician Donovan, who provides the falsetto and high harmony vocals.

BMI lists the composers of "Billion Dollar Babies" as Alice Cooper, Michael Bruce and Reggie Vinson (a session guitarist who worked with the band previously). Some sources list the composers as Cooper, Bruce, drummer Neal Smith, and "R. Reggie", the latter being an allusion to Vinson's nickname "Rockin' Reggie Vinson".

== Reception ==
Record World said that "produced by the incomparable Bob Ezrin, [the single] should see billions of Cooper babies flocking to the stores and gobbling it up."

== Track listing ==
No.	Title	Writer(s)	Length
1.	"Billion Dollar Babies"	Alice Cooper, Michael Bruce, Reggie Vinson	3:43
2.	"Mary Ann"	Alice Cooper, Michael Bruce	2:21

== Charts ==
Chart (1973)	Peak position
German Singles Chart	30
US Hot 100	57

== Personnel ==
- Alice Cooper – vocals
- Steve Hunter – lead guitar
- Dick Wagner – lead guitar
- Michael Bruce – rhythm guitar
- Dennis Dunaway – bass
- Neal Smith – drums
- Donovan – vocals
