= The Definitive Alice Cooper =

Compilation album by Alice Cooper
- Released: March 27, 2001
- Genre: Hard rock, heavy metal
- Length: 78:02
- Label: Rhino
- Producer: Alice Cooper

Alice Cooper chronology
| Mascara and Monsters: The Best of Alice Cooper (2001) | The Definitive Alice Cooper (2001) | Dragontown (2001) |

Professional ratings
Review scores
| Source | Rating |
|---|---|
| AllMusic | 4/5 stars |

The Definitive Alice Cooper is a compilation album by Alice Cooper, released in 2001 on Rhino Records. It is the international counterpart of Mascara & Monsters: The Best of Alice Cooper, with a slightly different track listing and a different cover, though both compilations feature the same back cover, tray insert and disc image. The album was released worldwide except in the United States.

== Track listing ==
The Definitive Alice Cooper track listing
| No. | Title | Length |
|---|---|---|
| 1. | "I'm Eighteen" | 2:57 |
| 2. | "Desperado" | 3:28 |
| 3. | "Under My Wheels" | 2:47 |
| 4. | "Halo of Flies" | 8:23 |
| 5. | "School's Out" | 3:31 |
| 6. | "Elected" | 3:43 |
| 7. | "Hello Hooray" | 3:03 |
| 8. | "Generation Landslide" | 4:31 |
| 9. | "No More Mr. Nice Guy" | 3:07 |
| 10. | "Billion Dollar Babies" | 3:04 |
| 11. | "Teenage Lament '74" | 3:19 |
| 12. | "Muscle of Love" | 3:19 |
| 13. | "Only Women Bleed" | 3:30 |
| 14. | "Department of Youth" | 3:16 |
| 15. | "Welcome to My Nightmare" | 2:47 |
| 16. | "I Never Cry" | 3:43 |
| 17. | "You and Me" | 3:26 |
| 18. | "How You Gonna See Me Now" | 3:53 |
| 19. | "From the Inside" | 3:31 |
| 20. | "Poison" | 4:26 |
| 21. | "Hey Stoopid" | 4:14 |

== Charts ==
Chart performance for The Definitive Alice Cooper
| Chart (2001) | Peak position |
|---|---|
| Australian Albums (ARIA) | 60 |
| Swedish Albums (Sverigetopplistan) | 58 |
| UK Albums (OCC) | 33 |

== Certifications ==
Certifications for The Definitive Alice Cooper
| Region | Certification | Certified units/sales |
|---|---|---|
| Australia (ARIA) | Gold | 35,000^{^} |
| United Kingdom (BPI) | Gold | 100,000^{^} |
^{^} Shipments figures based on certification alone.
