= The Alice Cooper Show =

Live album by Alice Cooper
- Released: December 1977
- Recorded: August 19–20, 1977
- Venue: The Aladdin Hotel, Las Vegas
- Genre: Glam rock, hard rock
- Length: 39:38
- Label: Warner Bros.
- Producer: Brian Christian: Bob Ezrin

Alice Cooper chronology
Lace and Whiskey (1977)	The Alice Cooper Show (1977)	From the Inside (1978)

Singles from The Alice Cooper Show
- 1. "School's Out" Released: June 1978

Professional ratings
Review scores
Source	Rating
AllMusic	2/5 stars
Music Week	3/4 stars
The Rolling Stone Album Guide	2/5 stars

The Alice Cooper Show is a live album by Alice Cooper, released by Warner Bros. in December 1977.

It was recorded live in Las Vegas at the Aladdin Hotel on August 19 and 20, 1977, during Cooper's "King of the Silver Screen" United States tour.

The Alice Cooper Show was rereleased in 1987 on CD, digitally in 2005, and on 180-gram vinyl in 2013.

== Track listing ==
Side one
No.	Title	Writer(s)	Length
1.	"Under My Wheels" (from Killer, 1971)	Michael Bruce, Dennis Dunaway, Bob Ezrin	2:35
2.	"I'm Eighteen" (from Love It to Death, 1971)	Alice Cooper, Glen Buxton, Bruce, Dunaway, Neal Smith	5:00
3.	"Only Women Bleed" (from Welcome to My Nightmare, 1975)	Cooper, Wagner	5:57
4.	"Sick Things" (from Billion Dollar Babies, 1973)	Cooper, Bruce, Wagner	0:59
5.	"Is It My Body" (from Love It to Death, 1971)	Cooper, Buxton, Dunaway, Bruce, Smith	2:36
6.	"I Never Cry" (from Alice Cooper Goes to Hell, 1976)	Cooper, Wagner	2:46

Side two
No.	Title	Writer(s)	Length
7.	"Billion Dollar Babies" (from Billion Dollar Babies, 1973)	Cooper, Bruce, Smith	3:18
8.	"Devil's Food"/"The Black Widow" (from Welcome to My Nightmare, 1975)	Cooper, Dick Wagner, Bob Ezrin, Vincent Price, Kelly Jay	5:52
9.	"You and Me" (from Lace and Whiskey, 1977)	Cooper, Wagner	2:25
10.	"I Love the Dead"/"Go to Hell"/"Wish You Were Here" (from Billion Dollar Babies/Alice Cooper Goes to Hell, 1973, 1976)	Cooper, Wagner, Ezrin	6:38
11.	"School's Out" (from School's Out, 1972)	Cooper, Buxton, Bruce, Dunaway, Smith	2:39

== Personnel ==
Musicians

- Alice Cooper – vocals
- Steve Hunter – guitar
- Dick Wagner – guitar, vocals
- Prakash John – bass, vocals
- Fred Mandel – keyboards
- Whitey Glan – drums

Production

- Pete Carlson – engineer
- Brian Christian – producer
- Bob Ezrin – producer
- Shep Gordon – executive producer
- Lee Herschberg – remastering
- Dick Wagner – director

== Charts ==
Chart (1977)	Peak position
Australian (Kent Music Report)	29
US Billboard 200	131
