= Alice Cooper: The Nightmare =

1975 television special

Video by Alice Cooper
- Released: 1975 TV Special; 1983 VHS & Betamax; 2017 DVD
- Genres: Fantasy; Hard rock; Heavy metal; Shock rock
- Length: 66:00
- Label: Warner Home Video

Alice Cooper chronology
Good to See You Again, Alice Cooper (1974)	Alice Cooper: The Nightmare (1975)	Welcome to My Nightmare (1976)

Alice Cooper: The Nightmare is a conceptual television special showcasing the music of the Welcome to My Nightmare album by American singer Alice Cooper. It originally broadcast in North America on April 25, 1975, by ABC.

In the TV special, Alice Cooper stars as "Steven" who is trapped in a nightmare he can't wake up from and tries to escape. Vincent Price also appears throughout the special, starring as the "Spirit of the Nightmare". The special features the Welcome to My Nightmare album in its entirety, with the addition of the song "Ballad of Dwight Fry" from the album Love It to Death by the original Alice Cooper band.

== Concept ==
In 2020, while being interviewed on the Bob Lefsetz podcast, Ezrin recalled that Alice Cooper's manager Shep Gordon had a clause that allowed the Alice Cooper band members to make a soundtrack album for another label. As a result, the Welcome to My Nightmare album on which that the television special was based needed to have a storyline to become a soundtrack. Ezrin and Cooper came up with a story concept for the album, with Cooper telling the story of the nightmares of the character Steven.

During the Bob Lefsetz podcast, Ezrin recounts that he and Alice Cooper initially created the storyline whereby; a rock star name Steven and his mistress are on a private jet, flying over the rocky mountains. The jet goes down and crashes, and both Steven and his mistress disappear. However, 28 days later, Steven emerges alone unharmed. During those 28 days, Steven became a vampire and he now lives out his days as a rock star by day and killer at night.

== Release and reception ==
When it was originally broadcast on television in 1975, the lyrics to "Only Women Bleed" were slightly changed. A portion of this version is featured on the Alice Cooper: Prime Cuts video, which was initially released in 1991.

Following its initial broadcast, the special won an Emmy for Outstanding Achievement in Video Tape Editing for a Special.

In 1983 the TV special was released on VHS and Betamax home video in the US and was nominated for a Grammy Award for Best Video Album in 1984, losing to Duran Duran for their self-titled video.

The TV special was released on a DVD titled Welcome to My Nightmare: Special Edition on September 8, 2017, which also serves as a re-release of the 1976 concert film Welcome to My Nightmare.

== Track listing ==
1. "Welcome to My Nightmare"
2. "Devil's Food"
3. "Some Folks"
4. "Only Women Bleed"
5. "Cold Ethyl"
6. "The Black Widow"
7. "Years Ago"
8. "Department of Youth"
9. "Years Ago (Reprise)
10. "Steven"
11. "The Awakening"
12. "Ballad of Dwight Fry"
13. "Escape"
14. "The Awakening (Reprise)"
15. "Credits"
