= Welcome to My Nightmare (disambiguation) =

Welcome to My Nightmare is a 1975 album by Alice Cooper.

Welcome to My Nightmare may also refer to:

- "Welcome to My Nightmare" (song), the title song from the album
- Welcome to My Nightmare Tour, a 1975-1977 world tour in support of the album
- Welcome to My Nightmare (film), a 1976 concert film based on the album
- Welcome 2 My Nightmare, a 2011 sequel album by Alice Cooper
