= Welcome to My Nightmare (film) =

- Directed by: David Winters
- Written by: Alan Rudolph
- Produced by: Bob Ezrin; David Winters
- Starring: Alice Cooper
- Cinematography: Joe Gannon; Larry Pizer
- Edited by: Stuart Baird; Gene Ellis; Jim Roddan; Anthony Sloman
- Production companies: DaBill Productions; Tommy J. Productions
- Distributed by: Key Pictures
- Release date: November 28, 1975
- Running time: 84 min.
- Country: United States
- Language: English
- Budget: $600,000

Welcome to My Nightmare is a 1975 concert film of Alice Cooper's show of the same title. It was produced, directed and choreographed by David Winters. The film accompanied the album, the stage show (also produced, directed and choreographed by Winters) by the same name and the TV special Alice Cooper: The Nightmare, the first ever rock music video album, starring Cooper and Vincent Price in person. Though it failed at the box office, it later became a midnight movie favorite and a cult classic.

== Background ==
In 1975, Alice Cooper released his first solo album, Welcome to My Nightmare, and a huge theatrical stage show was created and put together by Winters to 'tour the album'. While in the past the Alice Cooper stage show was semi-improvisatory, with confrontational elements of violence and satire (see Good to See You Again, Alice Cooper), the new production was purely horror-themed and professionally choreographed and performed to the split second by David Winters. With the edginess removed (gone were the bloody guillotine, the spit and the skewered baby dolls, although "Only Women Bleed" presented a drunken, physically abusive side to the character), the Welcome to My Nightmare show was part a carefully planned move toward a more mainstream-friendly 'Alice'.

Welcome to My Nightmare was a phantasmagorical exposition of music and theatre themed around a nightmare experienced by a young boy named Steven. Costing US $600,000 to produce, the show was a grand visual spectacle with an elaborate stage set, pre-filmed projections, four dancers, and elaborate costumes. Set in a graveyard/bedroom, a well-drilled band ran through the new album and a selection of older hits, while Alice encountered giant spiders, dancing skeletons, faceless silver demons and a 9-foot 'cyclops'.

Concert footage was taken from a series of London shows at the Wembley Arena on September 11–12, 1975. The film is out of sequence with the live show, and the final "Department of Youth" segment has some post-production inserts.

Before "Some Folks", a short medley was performed as the dancers danced in their skeleton costumes. The medley consisted of "Halo of Flies" (from Cooper's Killer album), "The Black Widow", and "Didn't We Meet" (which would be released on Cooper's next album, Alice Cooper Goes to Hell).

== Release ==
The film was a box office failure in its original 1975 release. However, like Phantom of the Paradise, The Rocky Horror Picture Show and others, Welcome to My Nightmare found a low-volume but dependable audience on the midnight movie circuit.

The film was first issued commercially on VHS in 1981, with numerous reissues since. A DVD issue was released in 2002, with the US version featuring commentary by Cooper.

== Reception ==
In his review published in the Los Angeles Times, Kevin Thomas praised it saying that it "is a slick, Vegas-type show, fairly cleverly assembled to string together a large slice of Cooper's ghoulish-accented shlock rock".

Glenn Garvin of Delta Democrat-Times gave it three out five star and found it un-even. He said "at different times it revolted me, fascinated me, bored me and charmed me."

Aaron Conn of Pop Culture Beast also found it flawed but said it "still manages to be a fun concert movie."

Janet Maslin in her review in The Boston Phoenix explained found it too grainy, and lacked of focus. While she liked the opening credits, showing's Cooper evolution through personal portrait, that moving forward it was simply a string of dance numbers that ended abruptly.

Marieval Yebra of Cryptic Rock liked it and said "as far as Rock Operas and dramatic shows go, this is one of the best by far. Props and theatrics galore, Alice Cooper’s Welcome To My Nightmare will keep you captivated from beginning to end".

Essi Berelian of Louder Sound liked it and said "a cult favourite, capturing a show perfectly tuned to insidiously slipping Cold Ethyl, Steven and Devil’s Food further into the mainstream."

== Track listing ==
1. Opening credits - The Awakening
2. Welcome To My Nightmare
3. Years Ago
4. No More Mr. Nice Guy
5. Years Ago (reprise)
6. I'm Eighteen
7. Some Folks
8. Cold Ethyl
9. Only Women Bleed
10. Years Ago (reprise)
11. Billion Dollar Babies
12. Devil's Food
13. The Black Widow
14. Steven
15. Welcome to My Nightmare (reprise)
16. Escape
17. School's Out
18. Department of Youth
19. End credits - Only Women Bleed (alternate version)

== Personnel ==
- Alice Cooper - Vocals
- Dick Wagner - Guitar, Vocals
- Steve Hunter - Guitar
- Josef Chirowski - Synthesizer, Keyboards, Clavinet, Fender Rhodes, Vocals
- Prakash John - Bass, Vocals
- Pentti "Whitey" Glan - Drums

== See also ==
- List of American films of 1975
