= Alice Cooper and Friends =

Video by Alice Cooper
- Released: 1977 TV Special; 1978 VHS
- Genres: Hard rock; Heavy metal; shock rock
- Length: 52:00
- Label: Media Video

Alice Cooper chronology
Welcome to My Nightmare (1976)	Alice Cooper and Friends (1977)	The Strange Case of Alice Cooper (1979)

Alice Cooper and Friends was a live music television special starring American singer Alice Cooper. Broadcast in the United States in September 1977, it was released on VHS in 1978. This rare video has a running time of 52 minutes, of which 25 minutes feature Cooper. It also features live footage of the Tubes, Nazareth and Sha Na Na.

Alice Cooper and Friends was filmed in concert on 19 June 1977 at the Anaheim Stadium in California. This was the first night of Cooper's "King of the Silver Screen" tour, in support of his album Lace and Whiskey. The special captured a very drunken and lethargic performance by Cooper, which he himself has dismissed as his worst performance. The video does include the infamous Chickens with Machine Guns sequence during the song "Lace and Whiskey". This special was the only commercially released video footage from that tour.

The video of the special has been discontinued since its original release, and has not been issued on DVD. Used copies regularly appear for sale online.

== Alice Cooper songs performed ==
- "School's Out"
- "Is It My Body?" (excerpt)
- "Under My Wheels" (excerpt)
- "Billion Dollar Babies" (excerpt)
- "You and Me"
- "Only Women Bleed" (excerpt)
- "Lace and Whiskey"
- "I Love the Dead"
