= Welcome 2 My Nightmare =

Studio album by Alice Cooper
- Released: September 13, 2011
- Genre: Hard rock
- Length: 52:44
- Label: UMe
- Producer: Bob Ezrin

Alice Cooper chronology
Along Came a Spider (2008)	Welcome 2 My Nightmare (2011)	Paranormal (2017)

Singles from Welcome 2 My Nightmare
- 1. "I'll Bite Your Face Off" Released: August 22, 2011; 2. "Caffeine" Released: 2011

Welcome 2 My Nightmare (also known as Welcome to My Nightmare 2) is the nineteenth solo and the twenty-sixth studio album by American rock musician Alice Cooper, released on September 13, 2011, by UME. It is a sequel to his 1975 album Welcome to My Nightmare. Peaking at No. 22 in the Billboard 200, it is Cooper's highest-charting album in the US since 1989's Trash.

The idea for the album came about soon after the thirtieth anniversary of the original Welcome to My Nightmare album, when Cooper spoke with producer Bob Ezrin, who proposed the idea of a sequel. Cooper liked the idea, and decided to recruit previous members of the Alice Cooper band. The concept of the album was described by Cooper as "another nightmare, and this one is even worse than the last one." He said that he had originally intended to make a sequel to his previous album, Along Came a Spider, but decided to make the Nightmare sequel after Ezrin explained that he "wasn't really into it."

Cooper announced the album's completion in February 2011 on his radio show, Nights with Alice Cooper. It was first scheduled to be released late in 2011 on Bob Ezrin's Bigger Picture label as part of a deal involving marketing, touring and production work by Bigger Picture for Cooper in the future. The album was then announced as being delayed until some time in 2012 due to Cooper's touring commitments, however it was finally released on September 13, 2011.

== Songs ==
Cooper began writing songs for the album during summer 2010, and by July 2010 there were a total of three songs completed. By October 2010, Cooper and Ezrin had written thirteen songs for the album, three of which had been recorded with Dennis Dunaway, Neal Smith and Michael Bruce, all members of the original incarnation of the Alice Cooper band. Regarding the sound of the album, Cooper said that parts of the album were intended to resemble the sound of Welcome to My Nightmare and music from the 1970s, and that "[i]f we can keep that going, it will really be something. It captures an era."

In addition to Cooper, Dunaway, Smith and Bruce and producer Ezrin, various outside artists co-wrote some songs on the album, including guitarist Tommy Henriksen, Buckcherry member Keith Nelson, songwriter Desmond Child, Dick Wagner (who had previously worked with Cooper), Chuck Garric (a member of Cooper's band for the 2011 tour), film composer Jeremy Rubolino, and Ke$ha, who also performed on the song "What Baby Wants."

=== "I Am Made of You" ===
Cooper compared this song to "Hello Hooray" from his 1973 album Billion Dollar Babies, calling it a "masterpiece" and an "epic song." The song went through many changes and was worked on "more than any other song on the album." The guitars are played by Swedish studio guitarist Tommy Denander, American guitarist Tommy Henriksen, and the solo by original Welcome to my Nightmare guitar player Steve Hunter, which is one of Cooper's favorites among any of his previous albums. The song's intro contains the piano part from the original Nightmare song, "Steven".

=== "Caffeine" ===
"Caffeine" was originally written as more of a rock-based song, but turned into more of a quirky and comical song that still kept the same energy that was originally intended. The song is about Steven using amphetamines and caffeine to stay awake. Cooper has said that a Big Bopper-like voice helped influence the chorus. The song was released as the album's second single.

=== "The Nightmare Returns" ===
The lyrics of the song show a similarity to the Nightmare on Elm Street series, and involves the main character Steven, frightened of going to sleep due to nightmares. The music attempts to portray a child creating lullabies at his piano.

=== "A Runaway Train" ===
"A Runaway Train" was based on the Dennis Dunaway Project's "Subway" from their 2006 album Bones From the Yard. Cooper decided to rework the song so it had no chorus; the track consists of only verse. The song also took inspiration from the classic song "Train Kept A-Rollin'". The way Alice Cooper sings it is very similar to how he sings in "Dance Yourself to Death", from the album Flush the Fashion. Country music star Vince Gill plays lead guitar on this song. This is one of three songs that the original Alice Cooper band performed on.

=== "Last Man on Earth" ===
"Last Man on Earth" details what happens to Alice after the train wreck at the end of the song "A Runaway Train." It is reminiscent of a Tom Waits song, is similar to "Some Folks" from Welcome to My Nightmare, and has been described as unexpected and "out there." The melody is from the popular Yiddish song "Bei Mir Bistu Shein."

=== "The Congregation" ===
Cooper says that the song was heavily inspired by The Beatles. "The Congregation" details Steven's tour through Hell. Rob Zombie guest stars on this song as "The Guide", who is possibly "The Curator" from the original Nightmare (originally portrayed by Vincent Price).

=== "I'll Bite Your Face Off" ===
The song's classic rock tone was Cooper's nod to the early Rolling Stones. In this song, Steven is introduced to the devil, his female guide in Hell (the same from "What Baby Wants"). "I'll Bite Your Face Off" was the album's first single and was released with a music video which features various live performances. One of these includes Cooper's show at the 100 Club in London with Johnny Depp on guitar. The single was another song on the album played by the original Alice Cooper band.

=== "When Hell Comes Home" ===
This song deals with a more matured nightmare that Steven would deal with 35 years later. He watches himself as a young boy being raised by an alcoholic father and an abused mother. The boy eventually snaps, and plans on murdering his father by putting one "right between his eyes." "When Hell Comes Home" is dark and macabre, and it sets itself apart from the previous songs, which are less serious and more comical. At the end of the solo, a man (supposedly the abusive father) is heard faintly yelling out "Steven", the name of the main character from the original Nightmare, hinting the fact he is the main character in this album as well. The song was played with the original band, who gave it a '70s feel that Cooper wanted.

=== "What Baby Wants" ===
While Cooper was thinking of a character to play the devil on Welcome 2 My Nightmare, he came across Kesha at the Grammys and said that she had the qualities of a "rock singer." In typical Alice Cooper fashion (harkening back to Billion Dollar Babies when Donovan sang with Cooper on the title track), he decided to bring Kesha in to work on the album because it would be unexpected. Cooper said about Kesha, "I think a lot of my audience is going to go KESHA!?, but she probably wrote the most disgusting lyrics in the song – we had to rein her in." According to Cooper, many of her lyrics had to be toned down for the album. Kesha plays the part of the devil, continuing from "I'll Bite Your Face Off", telling Alice that it's time to pay the ultimate price: his soul.

=== "I Gotta Get Outta Here" ===
"I Gotta Get Outta Here" ends the album with Alice finally accepting that he's going through a nightmare, and is ready to wake up. However, a choir of voices responds with "What part of dead don't you get?" Alice starts to protest, but with the repeated question, he begins to wonder what his reality is: Is he actually dead, left to forever live his nightmare, or is this taunt just another part of the dream? The conclusion of the song leaves the ending open to the listener.

Vince Gill again plays lead guitar on this track.

=== "The Underture" ===
Cooper compares the instrumental final track to a Broadway overture, filled with pieces of songs from the show. In this case, "The Underture" feature themes and music from the two Nightmares. In order, these are "Welcome to My Nightmare," "The Awakening," "Disco Bloodbath Boogie Fever," "Only Women Bleed," "Something to Remember Me By," "Devil's Food," "The Black Widow," "Ghouls Gone Wild," "I Am Made of You," "Years Ago," and concludes with "Steven."

=== "Under the Bed" ===
Continues with the overall theme of the nightmare by describing "they" who live "Under The Bed" and torment the narrator at night. The song contains a snippet of the guitar riff from "Welcome to My Nightmare" around the 3-minute mark and a brief guitar riff at various points that is reminiscent of "The Black Widow" from the original album. The song was made available only on the fan pack and Best Buy release. Small parts of the song seem to mirror the rhythm of the chorus to "Black Widow".

=== "A Bad Situation" ===
"A Bad Situation" was based on the idea of Alice's worst nightmare: Sitting in a cubicle in a nine-to-five job. Originally titled "My Favorite Mutation." The song was an iTunes bonus track.

=== "Flatline" ===
"Flatline" is a track released only on the vinyl edition of the album. The dark ambient song starts out with the sound of a heart rate monitor that beeps every couple of seconds (making the heart rate approximately 22 beats per minute). 46 seconds into the song, the monitor flatlines and remains this way almost until the end of the song. During this time, ambient sounds play in the background of the beep. Twelve seconds from the track's end, a deep, dark voice (similar to the one heard at the end of "What Baby Wants") can be heard saying Steven's name. This song implies that Steven has died, answering the question posed in "I Gotta Get Outta Here".

== Reception ==
Professional ratings
Aggregate scores
Source	Rating
Metacritic	68/100
Review scores
Source	Rating
About.com	4.5/5 stars
AllMusic	4/5 stars
Blabbermouth.net	8.5/10 stars
Daily Express	3/5 stars
The Guardian	4/5 stars
PopMatters	5/10 stars
Rolling Stone	2.5/5 stars
Ultimate Classic Rock	4/5 stars

The album received generally positive reviews from music critics, based on an aggregate score of 68/100 from Metacritic. Brave Words & Bloody Knuckles reviewer Mitch Lafon issued a review of the album on August 11. Noting that sequel albums are a "risky proposition", Welcome 2 My Nightmare was deemed "an equally comparable chef d’oeuvre." Lafon also praised the diverse sound on the album, explaining that it varies "from trashing disco to garage punk, pop balladry to a rocking number, very much in the spirit of the Rolling Stones."

William Clark of Guitar International wrote, "Every song off of this new record are absolutely noteworthy, and are bound to be stuck in your head for hours. And although voices in your head are a very serious and legitimate medical condition, I think we can make an exception with Alice Cooper". Allmusic also gave the album a four out of five star review.

== Commercial performance ==
Welcome 2 My Nightmare was expected to sell between 20,000 and 22,000 copies in the US during its first week on sale, though it actually ended up selling about 18,000. Album debuted at No. 22 on US Billboard chart which marked the highest debut for an album by Cooper in more than 20 years. The album also debuted on US Hard Rock Albums chart at No. 6 and Rock Albums chart at No. 11. In other countries, the album charted at No. 7 on the UK Top 40 Rock Albums, No. 16 in Australia, No. 17 in Finland, No. 19 in Sweden, No. 23 in Norway, No. 23 in New Zealand, No. 25 in Austria, No. 26 in Germany, No. 28 in Canada, also No. 2 on the Canadian Hard Rock Album Chart, No. 49 in Switzerland, No. 60 in Italy, No. 73 in France and No. 74 in Spain. The album did not chart in the United Kingdom as it was released as a bookazine in association with Classic Rock magazine, with this deluxe fan-pack including the album and 132-page magazine, alongside a giant poster, face paints, a metal badge and a face mask.

== Track listing ==
Standard Edition
No.	Title	Writer(s)	Length
1.	"I Am Made of You"	Alice Cooper, Bob Ezrin, Desmond Child	5:32
2.	"Caffeine"	Cooper, Ezrin, Tommy Henriksen, Keith Nelson	3:23
3.	"The Nightmare Returns"	Cooper, Ezrin	1:14
4.	"A Runaway Train" (feat. Vince Gill)	Cooper, Ezrin, Dennis Dunaway	3:51
5.	"Last Man on Earth"	Cooper, Ezrin, Piggy D, David Spreng	3:47
6.	"The Congregation" (feat. Rob Zombie)	Cooper, Ezrin, Henriksen	3:59
7.	"I'll Bite Your Face Off"	Cooper, Ezrin, Henriksen, Neal Smith	4:25
8.	"Disco Bloodbath Boogie Fever" (feat. John 5)	Cooper, Ezrin, Henriksen	3:35
9.	"Ghouls Gone Wild"	Cooper, Ezrin, Henriksen	2:33
10.	"Something to Remember Me By"	Cooper, Dick Wagner	3:16
11.	"When Hell Comes Home"	Cooper, Ezrin, Michael Bruce	4:29
12.	"What Baby Wants" (feat. Kesha)	Cooper, Ezrin, Henriksen, Kesha	3:43
13.	"I Gotta Get Outta Here" (feat. Vince Gill)	Cooper, Ezrin, Patterson Hood	4:20
14.	"The Underture" (Instrumental)	Cooper, Ezrin, Henriksen, Child, Wagner, Jeremy Rubolino, Kelly Jay Fordham	4:37

=== Bonus tracks ===
Fan Pack
No.	Title	Writer(s)	Length
15.	"Under the Bed"	Cooper, Ezrin, Henriksen	4:00
16.	"Poison" (Live at Download Festival)	Cooper, Child, John McCurry	5:01

Deluxe, Deluxe Digipak
No.	Title	Writer(s)	Length
15.	"We Gotta Get Out of This Place"	Mann, Weil	3:09
16.	"No More Mr. Nice Guy" (Live at Download Festival)	Cooper, Bruce	3:14
17.	"The Black Widow" (Live at Download Festival)	Cooper, Ezrin, Dick Wagner	5:24

Deluxe Edition (Canada) / Best Buy Exclusive Edition / Japan Edition
No.	Title	Writer(s)	Length
15.	"Under the Bed"	Cooper, Ezrin, Henriksen	4:00
16.	"Poison" (Live at Download Festival)	Cooper, Child, McCurry	5:01
17.	"No More Mr. Nice Guy" (Live at Download Festival)	Cooper, Bruce	3:14
18.	"The Black Widow" (Live at Download Festival)	Cooper, Ezrin, Wagner	5:24

Vinyl Edition
No.	Title	Writer(s)	Length
15.	"Flatline"	Cooper, Henriksen	3:27

iTunes Edition
No.	Title	Writer(s)	Length
15.	"A Bad Situation"	Cooper, Garric, Jim Bachi, Ezrin	3:43
16.	"We Gotta Get Out of This Place"	Barry Mann, Cynthia Weil	3:09
17.	"Dialogue – How They Came to Be"	Cooper (interview)	25:42

== Personnel ==
- Alice Cooper – vocals, harmonica
- Tommy Henriksen – lead guitar
- Bob Ezrin – producer

=== Additional musicians ===
- Pat Buchanan – guitars
- Jimmie Lee Sloas – bass
- Scott Williamson – drums
- Vicki Hampton – backing vocals
- Wendy Moten – backing vocals
- Hank Williams – mastering
- Desmond Child – co-songwriter
- Jeremy Rubolino – co-songwriter
- Michael Bruce – guitars, keyboards, backing vocals on "A Runaway Train", "I'll Bite Your Face Off" and "When Hell Comes Home"
- Dennis Dunaway – bass, backing vocals on "A Runaway Train", "I'll Bite Your Face Off" and "When Hell Comes Home"
- Neal Smith – drums, percussion, backing vocals on "A Runaway Train", "I'll Bite Your Face Off" and "When Hell Comes Home"
- Steve Hunter – guitars on "I Am Made Of You", "Something To Remember Me By", "When Hell Comes Home", "What Baby Wants" and "The Underture"
- Dick Wagner – co-songwriter / lead guitar on "The Underture"
- Tommy Denander – guitars on "I Am Made of You"
- Vince Gill – lead guitar on "A Runaway Train" and "Gotta Get Outta Here"
- Kesha – guest vocals on "What Baby Wants"
- Rob Zombie – backing vocals and spoken-word monologue on "The Congregation"
- John 5 – guitar on "Disco Bloodbath Boogie Fever"
- Keith Nelson – guitars, backing vocals on "Caffeine"
- Piggy D – co-songwriter and bass on "Last Man On Earth"
- David Spreng – co-songwriter and drums on "Last Man On Earth"
- Kip Winger – backing vocals on "Ghouls Gone Wild" & "The Congregation"
- Patterson Hood – guitar on "Gotta Get Outta Here"
- Damon Johnson – guitar on "We Gotta Get Out of This Place"
- Keri Kelli – guitar on "We Gotta Get Out of This Place"
- Chuck Garric – bass on "We Gotta Get Out of This Place"
- Jimmy DeGrasso – drums on "We Gotta Get Out of This Place" & "I Gotta Get Outta Here"

== Charts ==
Charts for Welcome 2 My Nightmare
Chart (2011)	Peak position
Australian Albums (ARIA)	16
Austrian Albums (Ö3 Austria)	25
Belgian Albums (Ultratop Flanders)	80
Belgian Albums (Ultratop Wallonia)	42
Belgian Heatseekers (Ultratop Flanders)	15
Canadian Albums (Billboard)	25
Finnish Albums (Suomen virallinen lista)	17
French Albums (SNEP)	72
German Albums (Offizielle Top 100)	26
Italian Albums (FIMI)	60
New Zealand Albums (RMNZ)	23
Norwegian Albums (VG-lista)	23
Russian Albums (2M)	17
Spanish Albums (Promusicae)	74
Swedish Albums (Sverigetopplistan)	19
Swiss Albums (Schweizer Hitparade)	49
UK Rock & Metal Albums (Official Charts)	7
US Billboard 200	22
US Top Album Sales (Billboard)	22
US Top Current Album Sales (Billboard)	21
US Top Hard Rock Albums (Billboard)	6
US Top Rock Albums (Billboard)	11

== Certifications ==
Sales certifications for Welcome 2 My Nightmare
Region	Certification	Certified units/sales
United States	—	18,000
