= Humanary Stew: A Tribute to Alice Cooper =

Humanary Stew: A Tribute To Alice Cooper

Compilation album by various artists
- Released: January 26, 1999
- Recorded: 1998
- Studios: The Office, Van Nuys, California
- Genres: Heavy metal, hard rock
- Label: Deadline Music
- Producer: Bob Kulick

Humanary Stew: A Tribute To Alice Cooper is a tribute album to Alice Cooper. Released in 1999 on Deadline Music, the album features covers of Alice Cooper songs, each performed by a supergroup of heavy metal and hard rock musicians. It was produced by Bob Kulick who also played guitar on all tracks.

== Production ==
Roger Daltrey agreed to participate as Cooper had performed at Daltrey's 50th birthday concert in 1994. Daltrey said that "No More Mr. Nice Guy" was "easy and natural to sing" and noted its similarity to "Substitute", which Cooper said was a revelation and gained new appreciation for the song.

== Track listing ==
Humanary Stew: A Tribute To Alice Cooper track listing
No.	Title	Writer(s)	Performers	Length
1.	"Under My Wheels"	Michael Bruce, Dennis Dunaway, Bob Ezrin	Vocals: Joe Elliott; Guitar: Kulick, Phil Collen; Bass: Chuck Wright; Saxophone: Clarence Clemons; Drums: Pat Torpey	3:20
2.	"School's Out"	Cooper, Bruce	Vocals: Dave Mustaine; Guitar: Kulick, Marty Friedman; Bass: Bob Daisley; Keyboards: Paul Taylor; Drums: Eric Singer	3:53
3.	"No More Mr. Nice Guy"	Cooper, Bruce	Vocals: Roger Daltrey; Guitar: Kulick, Slash; Bass: Mike Inez; Drums: Carmine Appice	3:38
4.	"Welcome to My Nightmare"	Cooper, Dick Wagner, Ezrin	Vocals: Ronnie James Dio; Guitar: Kulick, Steve Lukather; Bass: Phil Soussan; Keyboards: Taylor; Drums: Randy Castillo	5:10
5.	"Cold Ethyl"	Cooper, Ezrin	Vocals: Vince Neil; Guitar: Kulick, Mick Mars; Bass: Billy Sheehan; Drums: Simon Phillips	4:01
6.	"The Black Widow"	Cooper, Wagner, Ezrin	Vocals: Bruce Dickinson; Guitar: Kulick, Adrian Smith; Bass: Tony Franklin; Drums: Tommy Aldridge	4:45
7.	"Go To Hell"	Cooper, Wagner, Ezrin	Vocals: Dee Snider; Guitar: Kulick, Zakk Wylde; Bass: Rudy Sarzo; Keyboards: Taylor; Drums: Frankie Banali	4:34
8.	"Billion Dollar Babies"	Cooper, Bruce, Reggie Vinson	Vocals: Phil Lewis; Guitar: Kulick, George Lynch; Bass: Stuart Hamm; Keyboards: Derek Sherinian; Drums: Vinnie Colaiuta	3:55
9.	"Only Women Bleed"	Cooper, Wagner	Vocals: Glenn Hughes; Guitar: Kulick, Paul Gilbert; Bass: Mike Porcaro; Keyboards: Taylor; Drums: Steve Ferrone	5:41
10.	"Eighteen"	Cooper, Bruce, Glen Buxton, Dunaway, Neal Smith	Vocals: Don Dokken; Guitar: Kulick, John Norum; Bass: Tim Bogert; Drums: Gregg Bissonette	5:09
11.	"Elected"	Cooper, Bruce, Buxton, Dunaway, Smith	Vocals: Duff McKagan, Steve Jones; Guitar: Kulick, Jones; Bass: McKagan; Drums: Matt Sorum	4:04

== Additional personnel ==
Backing vocals: Cristy Bacuerle (track 2), David Glen Eisley (tracks 2, 3, 6, 9, 10), Stella Stevens (track 2), Tom Fletcher (track 2)

== Reception ==
Bill Gibb, writing for Cleveland Scene, noted "restraint exhibited by histrionics professor Ronnie James Dio," comparing it to the "over-the-top cover of what was a ballad" by Glenn Hughes.

Reviewing the album for AllMusic, critic Steve Huey described it as "a new twist on the well-worn tribute album concept," praising the use of track-specific supergroups and noting that the unusual artist pairings helped maintain listener interest. However, he also observed that the results were uneven, a common criticism of tribute albums featuring many different performers.

Scott Robinson described the cover of "Under My Wheels" as "well-executed, intense, but not overwhelming, but lacks the delicious anxiety of Cooper's original."

== Reissue ==
The album was reissued by Magick Records in 2005 as Welcome to the Nightmare: An All Star Salute to Alice Cooper with three additional tracks, and again by Cleopatra Records in 2019 as Welcome To The Nightmare: A Tribute To Alice Cooper. Credits as above except where noted.

Welcome To The Nightmare: A Tribute To Alice Cooper track listing
No.	Title	Writer(s)	Performers	Length
1.	"School's Out"			3:53
2.	"No More Mr. Nice Guy"			3:38
3.	"Welcome to My Nightmare"			5:10
4.	"Cold Ethyl"			4:01
5.	"The Black Widow"			4:45
6.	"Under My Wheels"			3:20
7.	"Go To Hell"			4:34
8.	"Billion Dollar Babies"			3:55
9.	"Only Women Bleed"			5:41
10.	"Eighteen"			5:09
11.	"Elected"			4:04
12.	"Dead Babies"	Cooper, Smith, Buxton, Bruce, Dunaway	Iced Earth	5:42
13.	"Bed Of Nails"	Cooper, Child, Warren	Children Of Bodom	3:58
14.	"Roses On White Lace"	Cooper, Roberts	Icarus Witch, Michael Romeo	4:24

It was also released on a limited edition LP record with 10 tracks, omitting Billion Dollar Babies, Dead Babies, Bed Of Nails and Roses On White Lace.
