= From the Inside (Alice Cooper album) =

Studio album by Alice Cooper
- Released: November 17, 1978
- Studios: Sound City, Van Nuys; Davlen, North Hollywood; Cherokee, Hollywood; Hollywood Sound Recorders, Hollywood; Kendun, Los Angeles; Studio 55, Los Angeles
- Genres: Pop rock; gothic rock
- Length: 39:08
- Label: Warner Bros.
- Producer: David Foster

Alice Cooper chronology
The Alice Cooper Show (1977)	From the Inside (1978)	Flush the Fashion (1980)

Singles from From the Inside
- 1. "How You Gonna See Me Now" Released: October 1978; 2. "From the Inside" Released: January 1979

From the Inside is the fourth solo and overall eleventh studio album by American rock singer Alice Cooper, released on November 17, 1978. It is a concept album about Cooper's stay in a New York asylum due to his alcoholism. All of the characters in the songs were based on actual people Cooper met in the asylum. Among other collaborators, the album features three longtime Elton John associates: lyricist Bernie Taupin, guitarist Davey Johnstone and bassist Dee Murray.

The lead single from the album was the power ballad "How You Gonna See Me Now", which peaked at No. 12 in the US Hot 100 chart. A music video was also created for it. The 'Madhouse Rocks Tour' in support of From the Inside lasted from February to April 1979 and saw all songs from the album as regular parts of the setlist except "Millie and Billie", "For Veronica’s Sake" and "Jackknife Johnny". Since 1979, however, songs from From the Inside have rarely been performed live, with the only cases being "Serious" on the 2003 'Bare Bones' tour and his 2018 One Night with Alice Cooper tour, "Wish I Were Born in Beverly Hills" on the 2005–2006 Dirty Diamonds Tour, "Nurse Rozetta" on the 'Descent into Dragontown' and 'Theatre of Death' tours, and "From the Inside" between 1997 and 1999 and on the late 2000s 'Theatre of Death' tour.

The album was adapted into a comic book, Marvel Premiere No. 50.

== Artwork and packaging ==
The album cover is a centre parting gatefold with Alice Cooper's face on the front. It opens up into a triple page image of a lunatic asylum. In the top left corner is a door with a sign above that reads "the quiet room"; this is a hidden flap that opens to reveal Cooper, sitting in a padded cell with a straitjacket by his feet. On the inside of the flap there is a message that reads "Inmates! In memory of Moonie", a nod to Cooper's old drinking buddy Keith Moon, who was the drummer for rock band the Who. The picture of Cooper in the cell is printed on the inner sleeve along with the song lyrics. On the rear of the album is a picture of the back of an asylum building with the track listing on the double doors, which open to show all the inmates stampeding down the corridor, waving papers in the air stating their release. Both the images hidden by flaps were printed on the inner sleeve.

== Critical reception ==
Professional ratings
Review scores
Source	Rating
AllMusic	3/5 stars
The Rolling Stone Album Guide	1/5 stars

Tom Carson of Rolling Stone, while stating that "the songs are full of good ideas", held that the songwriters and performers approached the concept too seriously, and that the album should have been done in a parody vein. He also criticized that the session band are too talented and precise, arguing that audiences had become enamored of Alice Cooper as a musician who does not strive for competence, and they would not accept such a fundamental change to his sound. The Globe and Mail wrote that, while the album "displays a hackneyed approach to the subject of madness, the lyrics are consistently interesting... The music, on the other hand, is a repetitive blend of heavy-metal cliches and simple melodics."

In a retrospective review for AllMusic, Alex Henderson found the album lacks the immediate appeal of Cooper's most popular albums, and at points "is too self-indulgent and intellectual for its own good, but at its best as on 'How You Gonna See Me Now', From the Inside is as riveting as it is inspiring." In 2009, Cooper stated "It was musically one of the best albums I ever did".

== Track listing ==
All lyrics are written by Alice Cooper and Bernie Taupin; all music is composed by Cooper and Dick Wagner, except where noted.

Side one
No.	Title	Writer(s)	Length
1.	"From the Inside"	Alice Cooper; Bernie Taupin; Dick Wagner; David Foster	3:55
2.	"Wish I Were Born in Beverly Hills"		3:38
3.	"The Quiet Room"		3:52
4.	"Nurse Rozetta"	Cooper; Taupin; Steve Lukather; Foster	4:15
5.	"Millie and Billie" (performed by Cooper and Marcy Levy)	Cooper; Taupin; Bruce Roberts	4:15

Side two
No.	Title	Writer(s)	Length
6.	"Serious"	Cooper; Taupin; Foster; Lukather	2:44
7.	"How You Gonna See Me Now"		3:57
8.	"For Veronica's Sake"		3:37
9.	"Jackknife Johnny"		3:45
10.	"Inmates (We’re All Crazy)"		5:03
Total length:			39:08

This was one of three Alice Cooper albums to be reissued in 1990 by Metal Blade Records on CD and cassette. The other two were Muscle of Love and Lace and Whiskey.

== Personnel ==
Credits are adapted from the From the Inside liner notes.

=== Musicians ===
- Alice Cooper – vocals

=== Additional musicians ===
- Dick Wagner – lead guitar
- David Foster – keyboards
- Davey Johnstone – lead guitar, backing vocals
- David Hungate – bass (tracks 2, 4, 7)
- Dee Murray – bass (track 1)
- Dennis Conway – drums
- Fred Mandel – keyboards
- John Pierce – bass
- Jim Keltner – percussion
- Jay Graydon – guitar
- Lee Sklar – bass
- Michael Ricciardella – drums
- Marcy Levy – co-lead vocals (track 5)
- Steve Lukather – guitar (tracks 4, 6, 7)
- Robbie King – keyboards
- Rick Shlosser – drums
- Rick Nielsen – guitar
- Bill Champlin, Kiki Dee, Flo & Eddie, Tom Kelly, Bobby Kimball, Sheryl Cooper, The Totally Committed Choir – backing vocals

=== Additional personnel ===
- David Foster – producer
- Humberto Gatica, Keith Olsen, David De Vore, Tom Knox, Howard Steele – engineers
- Jay Graydon, Steve Porcaro – synthesizer programing
- Frank DeCaro – strings conductor
- Alan Dockery – photography
- Lauren Kinde – front sleeve photo
- Pacific Eye and Ear – album concept and design

== Charts ==
Chart (1978–1979)	Peak position
Australian Albums (Kent Music Report)	12
Canada Top Albums/CDs (RPM)	60
Dutch Albums (Album Top 100)	14
New Zealand Albums (RMNZ)	14
UK Albums (Official Charts)	68
US Billboard 200	60
