= The Language of Thieves and Vagabonds =

Studio album by The Throbs
- Released: 1991
- Studio: Amigo Studios, Hollywood, California
- Genre: Hard rock
- Length: 50:16
- Label: Geffen
- Producer: Bob Ezrin and Dick Wagner

The Throbs chronology
The Language of Thieves and Vagabonds (1991)	Second (2014)

Professional ratings
Review scores
Source	Rating
AllMusic	3/5 stars
Rock Hard	8.0/10

The Language of Thieves and Vagabonds is an album by the band the Throbs. It was released by Geffen Records in 1991 and re-released in 2007. The 2007 Rock Candy reissue includes 2 bonus tracks: "Rainbow" and "The Queen of Borrowed Lights"

== Track listing ==
All tracks by The Throbs, except "Honeychild" by Roger Ericson & Bob Ezrin

Side one

1. "Underground" – 5:04
2. "Come Down Sister" – 4:02
3. "It's Not the End of the World" – 3:22
4. "Dreamin'" – 4:53
5. "Honeychild" – 4:47
6. "Rip It Up" – 3:12

Side two

1. "Ocean of Love" – 5:06
2. "Only Way Out" – 5:52
3. "Sweet Addiction" – 4:14
4. "Ecstasy" – 4:42
5. "Strange Behaviour" – 5:02

=== 2007 Rock Candy reissue bonus tracks ===
1. "Rainbow" – 4:34
2. "The Queen of Borrowed Lights" – 5:59

== Personnel ==
The Throbs

- Ronnie Sweetheart – lead vocals
- Roger Ericson – guitar
- Danny Nordahl – bass
- Ronnie Magri – drums

Additional musicians

- Little Richard – piano on "Ecstasy"
- Freddy Mandell – keyboards on "It's Not the End of the World" and "Rip It Up"
- Bob Ezrin – keyboards, percussion, producer, mixing

Production

- Dick Wagner – producer
- Garth Richardson – engineer, mixing
- Jon Primeau – additional recordings
- Stephen Marcussen – masterinmg at Precision Lacquer, Hollywood, California
- John Kalodner – A & R
