= Welcome to My Nightmare =

- Cover art by Drew Struzan

Studio album by Alice Cooper
- Released: February 28, 1975
- Recorded: 1974–1975
- Studios: Soundstage (Toronto); Record Plant East, Electric Lady and A&R Studios (New York City)
- Genres: Shock rock; glam rock
- Length: 43:19
- Labels: Atlantic (US/Canada); Anchor
- Producer: Bob Ezrin

Alice Cooper chronology
Greatest Hits (1974)	Welcome to My Nightmare (1975)	Alice Cooper Goes to Hell (1976)

Singles from Welcome to My Nightmare
- 1. "Department of Youth" Released: February 1975 (UK); 2. "Only Women Bleed" Released: March 1975 (US); 3. "Welcome to My Nightmare" Released: October 1975

Welcome to My Nightmare is the debut solo studio album by American rock musician Alice Cooper, released on February 28, 1975, by Atlantic Records. A concept album, its songs played in sequence form a journey through the nightmares of a child named Steven. The album inspired the Alice Cooper: The Nightmare TV special, a worldwide concert tour, and his Welcome to My Nightmare concert film (1976). The tour was one of the most over-the-top excursions of that era. Most of Lou Reed's band joined Cooper for this record. Internationally, Welcome to My Nightmare was released by the ABC subsidiary Anchor Records. It is Cooper's only album under Atlantic Records and Anchor Records.

The cover artwork was created by Drew Struzan for Pacific Eye & Ear. Rolling Stone would later rank it ninetieth on the list of the "Top 100 Album Covers of All Time". Famed horror film star Vincent Price provided a monologue in the song "Devil's Food", which was used as a segue into the next song, "The Black Widow". The song "Escape" was a rewrite of a song by the Hollywood Stars from their shelved album Shine Like a Radio – The Great Lost 1974 Album, which was finally released in 2013. The ballad "Only Women Bleed", released as a single, is a song originally composed by guitarist Dick Wagner for his late-1960s band the Frost, with a new title provided by Cooper and revised lyrics written by Wagner and Cooper. The remastered CD version adds three alternate version bonus tracks.

A sequel concept album, Welcome 2 My Nightmare, was released in 2011.

== Background ==
The Alice Cooper band broke up by spring of 1974, with Cooper beginning work on his first solo project. Cooper intended the music to be more theatrical than the previous glam rock focused records. Alice Cooper's manager, Shep Gordon, had a clause in his contract that allowed the members of Alice Cooper to do a soundtrack album for a label other than Warner Brothers. As a result, Shep Gordon and Alice Cooper went to Atlantic Records, a sister label to Warner Brothers, to begin work on the album. Cooper hired Bob Ezrin, who had produced four previous Cooper records, to collaborate with him.

Ezrin, Steve Hunter, and Dick Wagner had all performed on the Alice Cooper band’s 1973 studio album Billion Dollar Babies, produced by Ezrin. Subsequently, Ezrin produced and performed on Lou Reed’s 1973 concept album Berlin, including Hunter, Wagner, and Tony Levin. Reed’s band on his following live album Rock 'n' Roll Animal (1974) was composed of Hunter, Wagner, Prakash John, and Pentti Glan. Ezrin and Cooper hired all four members of Reed’s live band, plus Levin, to work on Cooper’s new album. Wagner and Ezrin would co-write the majority of the tracks with Cooper.

== Concept ==
In 2020, while being interviewed on the Bob Lefsetz podcast, Ezrin recalled that Alice Cooper's manager Shep Gordon had a clause that allowed the Alice Cooper band members to make a soundtrack album for another label. As a result, the album needed to have a storyline to become a soundtrack, that would subsequently be adapted into a film or television show. Ezrin and Cooper came up with a story concept for the album, with Cooper telling the story of the nightmares of the character Steven.

During the Bob Lefsetz podcast, Ezrin recounts that he and Alice Cooper initially created the storyline, in which a rock star named Steven and his mistress are on a private jet flying over the Rocky Mountains. The jet crashes, and both Steven and his mistress disappear. However, 28 days later, Steven emerges alone and unharmed. During those 28 days, Steven became a vampire and he now lives out his days as a rock star by day and killer at night.

The album was ultimately adapted into a television show called Alice Cooper: The Nightmare.

== Critical reception ==
Professional ratings
Review scores
Source	Rating
AllMusic	4.5/5 stars
Christgau's Record Guide	B−
Rolling Stone	(mixed)
Classic Rock	4.5/5 stars

Dave Marsh of Rolling Stone called the album "a TV soundtrack that sounds like one", finding it gimmicky and lamenting the absence of the original Alice Cooper band's sound. Robert Christgau gave the album a B− grade, stating that it "actually ain't so bad – no worse than all the others" and Cooper's "nose for what the kids want to hear is as discriminating as it is impervious to moral suasion".

A review by AllMusic's Greg Prato considered the album Cooper's best solo work, despite the absence of the original band, writing: "While some tracks stray from his expected hard rock direction, there's plenty of fist-pumping rock to go around." In a 2018 review, Classic Rock said: "as far as landmarks go, Welcome To My Nightmare remains one of the best things Alice Cooper has ever done, the cunning combination of shock-rock and Broadway pizzazz spawning a classic with plenty of theatrical potential."

== Track listing ==
Side one
No.	Title	Writer(s)	Length
1.	"Welcome to My Nightmare"	Alice Cooper, Dick Wagner	5:19
2.	"Devil's Food"	Cooper, Bob Ezrin, Kelley Jay	3:38
3.	"The Black Widow"	Cooper, Wagner, Ezrin	3:37
4.	"Some Folks"	Cooper, Alan Gordon, Ezrin	4:19
5.	"Only Women Bleed"	Cooper, Wagner	5:49

Side two
No.	Title	Writer(s)	Length
1.	"Department of Youth"	Cooper, Wagner, Ezrin	3:18
2.	"Cold Ethyl"	Cooper, Ezrin	2:51
3.	"Years Ago"	Cooper, Wagner	2:51
4.	"Steven"	Cooper, Ezrin	5:52
5.	"The Awakening"	Cooper, Wagner, Ezrin	2:25
6.	"Escape"	Cooper, Kim Fowley, Mark Anthony - from the band "Hollywood Stars" (not Chameleon)	3:20

2002 CD reissue bonus tracks
No.	Title	Writer(s)	Length
12.	"Devil's Food" (alternate version)	Cooper, Ezrin, Jay	5:13
13.	"Cold Ethyl" (alternate version)	Cooper, Ezrin	2:56
14.	"The Awakening" (alternate version)	Cooper, Wagner, Ezrin	4:20

== Personnel ==
Musicians

- Alice Cooper – lead vocals
- Dick Wagner – electric and acoustic guitar, vocals
- Steve "Deacon" Hunter – electric and acoustic guitar
- Prakash John – bass
- Pentti "Whitey" Glan – drums

Additional personnel

- Bob Ezrin – synthesizer, keyboards, vocals, producer
- Jozef Chirowski – keyboards, clavinet, vocals, Fender Rhodes
- Tony Levin – bass on "Welcome to My Nightmare" and "Escape"
- Johnny "Bee" Badanjek – drums on "Welcome to My Nightmare" and "Escape"
- Vincent Price – The Curator
- Trish McKinnon – "Mom"
- David Ezrin, Gerry Lyons, Michael Sherman, the Summerhill Children's Choir – vocals
- Bob Ezrin, Allan Macmillan – arrangements

Technical

- Jeffrey Morgan – liner notes (reissue)
- Michael Sherman – production assistant
- Phil Ramone – engineer on "Only Women Bleed", recording at A&R Studios
- Corky Stasiak, Dave Palmer, Ed Sprigg, Rod O'Brien – recording at Record Plant East and Electric Lady Studios
- Dave Palmer, Jim Frank – recording at Soundstage
- Drew Struzan – artwork

== Charts ==
=== Weekly charts ===
Chart (1975)	Peak position
Australian Albums (Kent Music Report)	5
Canada Top Albums/CDs (RPM)	2
Finnish Albums (Suomen virallinen lista)	23
New Zealand Albums (RMNZ)	24
UK Albums (Official Charts)	19
US Billboard 200	5

Chart (2021)	Peak position
Hungarian Albums (MAHASZ)	33
Scottish Albums (Official Charts)	48

=== Year-end charts ===
Chart (1975)	Peak position
Australian Albums (Kent Music Report)	21
Canada Top Albums/CDs (RPM)	13
US Billboard 200	23

== Certifications ==
Certifications for Welcome to My Nightmare
Region	Certification	Certified units/sales
Australia (ARIA)	2× Platinum	140,000^{^}
Canada (Music Canada)	2× Platinum	200,000^{^}
United Kingdom (BPI)	Silver	60,000^{^}
United States (RIAA)	Platinum	1,000,000^{^}
^{^} Shipments figures based on certification alone.

== Stage adaptation ==
Cooper talked with Rolling Stone over the theatrical adaptation of his album, although there has been little traction on this since 2010.

== Cover versions ==
The 1999 tribute album Humanary Stew: A Tribute to Alice Cooper includes covers of "Cold Ethyl" by Vince Neil, Mick Mars, Mike Inez, Billy Sheehan and Simon Phillips and "The Black Widow" by Bruce Dickinson, Adrian Smith, Tony Franklin, Tommy Aldridge and David Glen Eisley. The album also includes covers of the title track and "Only Women Bleed". All four tracks also feature the album's producer, Bob Ezrin.
