= Good to See You Again, Alice Cooper =

1974 feature film starring Alice Cooper

Video by Alice Cooper
- Released: 1974 Cinema; 2005 DVD
- Genre: Hard rock, heavy metal, shock rock
- Length: 100min
- Label: Shout! Factory; Eagle Vision

Alice Cooper chronology
Good to See You Again, Alice Cooper (1974)	Welcome To My Nightmare (1976)

Good to See You Again, Alice Cooper is a 1974 feature film starring Alice Cooper. The movie primarily features live concert footage of the Alice Cooper band on their record-breaking Billion Dollar Babies tour, filmed in Texas (mostly at the Sam Houston Coliseum) in April 1973, with some footage from other tour stops, including the Memorial Coliseum, Portland, Oregon, intercut with 'comedy' scenes of a German film director chasing the "Cooper gang" for revenge after they abandoned his would-be masterpiece movie.

Two versions of the film exist. The alternate version was issued for its original theatrical release across the US in 1974. Poorly edited and virtually unscripted, the 'storyline' segments of the original version were replaced with black & white excerpts of scenes from old Hollywood movies. Despite this the film still failed at the box office. This version of the film remains commercially unreleased, although bootleg copies have been circulating amongst fans and at Record Fairs readily since the early-1980s. The original version of the film was eventually restored and released in 2005 on DVD, which includes Cooper providing insightful audio commentary. On September 14, 2010 Shout! Factory released the film (original version) on Blu-ray for the first time.

The film was shown only in Broome County, New York on its opening day, the one place in the USA that banned Alice Cooper from playing at their arena the year before.

The film provides a glimpse of a far less family-friendly Alice Cooper than that portrayed in the Welcome to My Nightmare concert film (shot two years later on the lead singer's first solo tour). The concert segments were performed by the original five-piece band (plus two live session musicians) at their artistic and commercial peak, and there is ample evidence of the behavior and implications which made the early Alice Cooper character such a controversial figure. The heavy sarcasm, pointed social satire (mannequin stage-props equipped with pubic hair, skewered baby dolls, a bloody 'execution' sequence, and in the show's finale, when an American flag is unfurled and a Richard M. Nixon impersonator is 'beaten up' by the entire band), confrontational improvisation (frontman Cooper taunting audience members), and the infamous boa constrictor were all present.

== Track listing ==
1. "The Lady Is a Tramp" (Studio segment)
2. "Hello Hooray"
3. "Billion Dollar Babies"
4. "Elected"
5. "I'm Eighteen"
6. "Raped and Freezin'"
7. "No More Mr. Nice Guy"
8. "My Stars"
9. "Unfinished Sweet"
10. "Sick Things"
11. "Dead Babies"
12. "I Love the Dead"
13. "School's Out"
14. "Under My Wheels"

== Personnel ==
- Alice Cooper - Vocalist
- Michael Bruce - Guitarist
- Glen Buxton - Guitarist
- Dennis Dunaway - Bassist
- Neal Smith - Drummer
- Mick Mashbir - Guitarist
- Bob Dolin - Keyboardist
- Amazing Randi - Dentist, Executioner
- Cindy Smith - Dancing Tooth
- Fred Smoot - Director, Lone Person, Leroy
- Jefferson Kewley - Baron Krelve
- Pat McAllister - Group's Manager, Wrangler, Box Office Man

== DVD Features ==
The special features of the DVD are:

- Audio commentary by Alice Cooper
- "Play concert only" viewing option
- Original theatrical trailer and radio spots
- Deleted scenes and outtakes
- Poster gallery with original promotional material
- Band biographies
- Hidden Easter Eggs
