= The Throbs =

American rock band

- Origin: New York City, U.S.
- Genres: Hard rock, sleaze rock, glam metal
- Years active: 1985–1991
- Labels: Geffen/DGC, Rock Candy
- Members: Ronnie Sweetheart; Danny Nordahl; Chad Stewart; Sam Koltun
- Past members: Pete Pagan; Anthony Smedile; Jeff West; Ginger; Ronnie Magri; Roger Ericson

The Throbs were a hard rock band originally formed in Toronto in 1985 and recreated in New York City in mid-1988. The original lineup included singer Ronnie Sweetheart and guitarist Jeff Campbell, who went on to join the Forgotten Rebels. In 1986 the Toronto lineup contributed the song I’ll Do What I Want to Music From The Armpit Of Canada, a compilation album of bands from the area of Hamilton, Canada. The New York lineup included singer Ronnie Sweetheart, bassist Danny Nordahl, drummer Ronnie Magri and guitarist Roger Ericson. They recorded one album titled The Language of Thieves and Vagabonds produced by Bob Ezrin and Dick Wagner in 1991 for Geffen Records. Little Richard made a special appearance on piano on the track "Ecstasy". The band was dropped by their label six months after the release of the album and failed to continue. After the departures of Sweetheart and Magri, Ericson & Nordahl formed The Vibes. The album was reissued by Rock Candy in 2007 with additional liner notes and two previously unreleased demo tracks. A second album by The Throbs was made available online in 2014, appropriately titled Second.

== Later activities ==
- Ronnie Sweetheart was a member/guitarist of VO5 with former Skid Row singer Sebastian Bach.
- Roger Ericson was a member of Smashed Gladys and can be heard on their 1988 Elektra release Social Intercourse and before that was a member of the cult band Angels in Vain.
- Danny Nordahl is now in Faster Pussycat, and was in The Newlydeads with three of his current Faster Pussycat bandmates, and in Motochrist, N-Y loose and Tracii Guns's version of L.A. Guns. He also was one of the passing members of Angels in Vain.
- Ronnie Magri was in the band Sweet Pain (Combat Records 1985) with former L.A. Guns and Faster Pussycat bassist Kelly Nickels. After moving to New Orleans in 1995, Magri has been involved in the neo-burlesque scene and worked with Dita Von Teese.

== Members ==
- Ronnie Sweetheart – vocals
- Danny Nordahl – bass, vocals
- Chad Stewart – drums
- Sam Koltun – guitar

Former

- Ronnie Magri – drums
- Roger Ericson – guitar
- Pete Trainor – guitar
- Ginger – guitar
- Anthony Smedile – drums
- Jeff West – drums
- Jonny Tingle – vocals

== Discography ==
Albums

- The Language of Thieves and Vagabonds (1991)
- Second (2014)

Singles

- "Come Down Sister" (1991)
