= Welcome to My Nightmare (song) =

Single by Alice Cooper

from the album Welcome to My Nightmare
- B-side: "Cold Ethyl" (US) "Black Widow" (UK)
- Released: October 1975
- Genre: Hard rock; disco
- Length: 5:19 (album version) 2:48 (single version)
- Label: Atlantic Records 3298
- Songwriters: Alice Cooper, Dick Wagner, Bob Ezrin
- Producer: Bob Ezrin

Alice Cooper singles chronology
"Department of Youth" (1975)	"Welcome to My Nightmare" (1975)	"I Never Cry" (1976)

"Welcome to My Nightmare" is a song by American rock musician Alice Cooper, released in 1975 as the third single from his debut solo album Welcome to My Nightmare. It peaked at 45 on the Billboard Hot 100. The song itself mixes elements of disco, jazz, hard rock, and keeps a "heavy-yet-funky beat". Cooper later performed the song on The Muppet Show.

Acoustic guitar is played by Dick Wagner, bass by Tony Levin, clavinet by Jozef Chirowski, drums by Johnny "Bee" Badanjek, and electric guitar by Steve Hunter.

== Reception ==
"Welcome to My Nightmare" was placed tenth on a list AOL Radio made of the "10 Best Halloween Songs".

Record World said on the single release that "Alice sounds downright ghoulish on this re-mixed and edited LP track."

== Cover versions ==
Ronnie James Dio, Steve Lukather, Bob Kulick, Phil Soussan, Randy Castillo and Paul Taylor covered the song on the 1999 tribute album Humanary Stew: A Tribute to Alice Cooper.
