= Lace and Whiskey =

Studio album by Alice Cooper
- Released: April 29, 1977
- Studios: Soundstage (Toronto); Cherokee (Hollywood; Record Plant (New York); RCA (Los Angeles); Producer's Workshop (Los Angeles)
- Genres: Hard rock; pop rock; gothic rock
- Length: 41:17
- Label: Warner Bros.
- Producer: Bob Ezrin

Alice Cooper chronology
Alice Cooper Goes to Hell (1976)	Lace and Whiskey (1977)	The Alice Cooper Show (1977)

Singles from Lace and Whiskey
- 1. "You and Me" Released: April 1977 (US); 2. "(No More) Love at Your Convenience" Released: May 1977 (UK)

Lace and Whiskey is the third solo and tenth overall studio album by American rock singer Alice Cooper, released on April 29, 1977, by Warner Bros. Records.

== Background ==
After years of portraying a sinister persona, Alice Cooper shifted direction with Lace and Whiskey, adopting the character of Maurice Escargot, a heavy-drinking comic private investigator inspired by Inspector Clouseau. Cooper appears as Escargot on the album's back cover. While still rooted in rock, the record drew stylistic influence from his love for 1940s and 1950s films and music. The album peaked at No. 42 on the US Billboard 200 and No. 33 on the UK Albums Chart.

The album's lead single, "You and Me", was an easy listening ballad which provided Cooper with his last US top-ten single for twelve years. "(No More) Love at Your Convenience", a disco-inspired pop song, was released as the second single — it did not chart in most countries. Music videos were created for both songs, at a time well before the advent of MTV. The song "King of the Silver Screen" features a quote of the main motif of the "Battle Hymn of the Republic".

Cooper's King of the Silver Screen tour in support of this album featured a stage set designed as a giant TV, with its slit screen allowing Cooper and his dancers to jump into and out of it along to filmed choreographed sequences during songs, and had comedic mock commercials screened in between some songs. The tour only ran in the US and Canada, throughout the summers of 1977 and 1978, and for 1978 would be renamed the School's Out for Summer tour. Filmed highlights from the opening night of the 1977 tour, capturing a very inebriated Cooper, were featured in the Alice Cooper and Friends TV special. The tour's Las Vegas concerts were recorded, resulting in the live album The Alice Cooper Show (1977). With the exception of "It's Hot Tonight", which was a regular part of setlists on the following Madhouse Rocks, the 2001 Brutal Planet and the 2008–2009 Psychodrama tours, and "Road Rats" which was a regular during the 1980 Flush the Fashion tour, nothing from Lace and Whiskey has been performed since the close of the School's Out for Summer '78 tour. "Damned If You Do", "Ubangi Stomp", "(No More) Love at Your Convenience", "I Never Wrote Those Songs", and "My God" have never been played live by Cooper.

It was after the completion of the 1977 tour, that Cooper checked into a New York-based sanitarium for his first treatment for alcoholism.

During the initial stage of this album's era, when it was clear that Cooper was not going to return from his new success, original Alice Cooper group members Dennis Dunaway, Neal Smith, and Michael Bruce formed a new band with Mike Marconi and Bob Dolin called "The Billion Dollar Babies". Michael Bruce sang their lead vocals.

Lace and Whiskey was digitally remastered and re-released on CD by Metal Blade Records in 1990.

The opening song "It's Hot Tonight" would be sampled by the rap rock group Beastie Boys for the song "What Comes Around" on their second studio album Paul's Boutique (1989).

== Critical reception ==
Professional ratings
Review scores
Source	Rating
AllMusic	2/5 stars
Christgau's Record Guide	C+
Rolling Stone	(unfavorable)

The Indianapolis News wrote that "Cooper is going across the board with ballads, love songs, heavy rockers, country rock and comedy."

Classic Rock described the album as "A cry for help more than anything else" and "it also found Alice drifting ever further away from his glory days as the king of shock rock."

== Track listing ==
All tracks are written by Alice Cooper, Dick Wagner and Bob Ezrin, except where noted.

Side one
No.	Title	Writer(s)	Length
1.	"It’s Hot Tonight"		3:21
2.	"Lace and Whiskey"		3:14
3.	"Road Rats"		4:51
4.	"Damned If You Do"		3:14
5.	"You and Me"	Cooper; Wagner	5:07

Side two
No.	Title	Writer(s)	Length
1.	"King of the Silver Screen"		5:35
2.	"Ubangi Stomp"	Charles Underwood	2:12
3.	"(No More) Love at Your Convenience"		3:49
4.	"I Never Wrote Those Songs"		4:34
5.	"My God"		5:40
Total length:			41:17

== Personnel ==
Credits are adapted from the Lace and Whiskey liner notes.

- Alice Cooper — vocals
- Dick Wagner — guitar, vocals
- Steve Hunter — guitar
- Bob Babbitt — bass guitar
- Allan Schwartzberg — drums

Additional personnel

- Prakash John — bass guitar on "Road Rats"
- Tony Levin — bass guitar on "Lace and Whisky", "Damned If You Do" and "Ubangi Stomp"
- Jim Gordon — drums on "Road Rats", "Damned If You Do" and "My God"
- Jimmy Maelen — percussion
- Al Kooper — piano on "Damned If You Do"
- Allan Macmillan — piano on "I Never Wrote Those Songs"
- Josef Chirowski — keyboards
- Bob Ezrin — keyboards, vocals
- Ernie Watts — tenor saxophone, clarinet
- Julia Tillman, Lorna Willard, Venetta Fields — vocals on "(No More) Love at Your Convenience"
- The California Boys' Choir — choir
- Douglas Neslund — choir master

== Charts ==
Chart (1977)	Peak position
Australian Albums (Kent Music Report)	3
Canada Top Albums/CDs (RPM)	27
New Zealand Albums (RMNZ)	32
Swedish Albums (Sverigetopplistan)	43
UK Albums (Official Charts)	33
US Billboard 200	42

== Certifications ==
Region	Certification	Certified units/sales
Australia (ARIA)	Platinum	50,000^{^}
^{^} Shipments figures based on certification alone.
