= I Never Cry =

- Single cover

Single by Alice Cooper

from the album Alice Cooper Goes to Hell
- B-side: "Go to Hell"
- Released: June 7, 1976 (US)
- Genre: Soft rock
- Length: 3:44
- Label: Warner Bros.
- Songwriters: Alice Cooper; Dick Wagner
- Producer: Bob Ezrin

Alice Cooper singles chronology
"Welcome to My Nightmare" (1975)	"I Never Cry" (1976)	"You and Me" (1977)

"I Never Cry" is a song by American rock singer Alice Cooper. It was originally released on his second solo studio album Alice Cooper Goes to Hell (1976). The song was written by Cooper and Dick Wagner.

== Background ==
On an episode of his radio show broadcast on November 23, 2009, Cooper stated that "I Never Cry" was his biggest selling single; it was one of only two gold records Cooper earned in the US, the other being for his 1989 comeback hit "Poison". "I Never Cry" was written about Cooper's experiences with alcoholism, which one year later sent the performer into rehab. He called the song "an alcoholic confession".

As with most of Cooper's softer ballads, it fared poorly in recurrent rotation; it was too soft for the classic rock format, while classic hits stations have largely ignored it.

"I Never Cry" was performed live by Cooper, though not consistently, during all tours up to his break in touring due to his addiction to crack cocaine and eventual relapse into alcoholism following 1981's Special Forces tour. When Cooper returned to touring after Constrictor (1986), "I Never Cry" was never again performed until the 2002 'Descent into Dragontown' tour, following which the song became was a regular part of setlists on the 2005–06 'Dirty Diamonds' and 2009–10 'Theatre of Death' tours.

== Chart performance ==
The song peaked at No. 12 on the US Billboard Hot 100 and at No. 9 on Cashbox in January 1977. In Canada, it spent two weeks at No. 5.

=== Weekly charts ===
Chart (1976–1977)	Peak position
Australia	23
Canada RPM Top Singles	5
Canada RPM Adult Contemporary	18
US Billboard Hot 100	12
US Billboard Adult Contemporary	24
US Cashbox Top 100	9

=== Year-end charts ===
Chart (1976)	Rank
Canada RPM Top Singles	80

Chart (1977)	Rank
Canada RPM Top Singles	126
US (Joel Whitburn's Pop Annual)	99

=== Certifications ===
Region	Certification	Certified units/sales
United States (RIAA)	Gold	1,000,000^{^}
^{^} Shipments figures based on certification alone.

== Cover versions ==
- "I Never Cry" was covered by Spanish rock band Hombres G on their debut studio album as "No llorare".
- It was also covered by Poison on the 2007 studio album, Poison'd!

== In popular culture ==
- OPM R&B artist Jay R performed the song in season 1 of the Philippine singing competition Your Face Sounds Familiar with a full impersonation of Alice Cooper. Cooper acknowledged the performance in a tweet.
- Child actor Awra Briguela performed the song in kids season 1 of the Philippine singing competition Your Face Sounds Familiar Kids with a full impersonation of Alice Cooper. Cooper acknowledged the performance in a tweet.
- Actor Christian Bables performed the song in season 3 of the Philippine singing competition Your Face Sounds Familiar with a full impersonation of Alice Cooper. Cooper acknowledged the performance in a tweet.
- The song was used in the final scene and closing credits of the 2011 Bobcat Goldthwait action black comedy film, God Bless America.
- The song was covered by Filipina-Australian actress Iya Villania on her sole studio album, Finally! (2008)
