= Alice Cooper Goes to Hell =

Studio album by Alice Cooper
- Released: June, 1976
- Studios: Soundstage, Toronto; Record Plant East, New York and RCA Recording Studios, Los Angeles
- Genres: Hard rock; pop rock; AOR
- Length: 43:15
- Label: Warner Bros.
- Producer: Bob Ezrin

Alice Cooper chronology
Welcome to My Nightmare (1975)	Alice Cooper Goes to Hell (1976)	Lace and Whiskey (1977)

Professional ratings
Review scores
Source	Rating
AllMusic	4/5 stars
The Encyclopedia of Popular Music	2/5 stars
MusicHound Rock: The Essential Album Guide	2.5/5 stars
The Rolling Stone Album Guide	1/5 stars

Alice Cooper Goes to Hell (often shortened to Goes to Hell) is the second solo and overall ninth studio album by American rock musician Alice Cooper, released in 1976. A continuation of Welcome to My Nightmare as it continues the story of Steven, the concept album was written by Cooper with guitar player Dick Wagner and producer Bob Ezrin.

With the success of "Only Women Bleed" from his first solo effort, Alice continued with the rock ballads on this album. "I Never Cry" was written about his drinking problem, which would in one year send the performer into rehab and affect all his subsequent music up to and including 1983's DaDa. Cooper called the song "an alcoholic confession."

== Critical reception ==
Rolling Stone wrote that "the soppy old standard, 'I'm Always Chasing Rainbows', probably expresses [Cooper's] musical sympathies much better than this record’s dynamic, if derivative, rock & roll."

Classic Rock wrote that "Goes To Hell is the nadir of 70s AOR rock, a bloated mess of over-theatrical radio-goo, cheesy ballads and disco.

=== Live performances ===
The "Alice Cooper Goes to Hell" tour of 1976 was completely cancelled prior to commencement due to Cooper suffering from anemia at the time. However, a number of songs from the album ended up in Cooper's live show. "Go to Hell" proved the last song until the 1989 hit song "Poison" to become a consistent part of Cooper's live setlists, being performed on most tours to the present. "I Never Cry" was also regularly performed in the late 1970s and during the 2000s, while "Guilty" was performed regularly on the Flush the Fashion and Special Forces tours and occasionally during the 2000s, and "Wish You Were Here" was frequently played on the tours for the following two albums. In September 2025, Cooper would perform "Going Home" for the first time ever, doing so however as a partial performance with band vocals only.

== Track listing ==
All tracks are written by Alice Cooper, Dick Wagner and Bob Ezrin, except where noted.

Side one
No.	Title	Writer(s)	Length
1.	"Go to Hell"		5:15
2.	"You Gotta Dance"		2:45
3.	"I'm the Coolest"		3:57
4.	"Didn't We Meet"		4:16
5.	"I Never Cry"	Cooper, Wagner	3:44

Side two
No.	Title	Writer(s)	Length
6.	"Give the Kid a Break"		4:14
7.	"Guilty"		3:22
8.	"Wake Me Gently"		5:03
9.	"Wish You Were Here"		4:36
10.	"I'm Always Chasing Rainbows"	Harry Carroll, Joseph McCarthy	2:08
11.	"Going Home"		3:47

== Personnel ==
- Alice Cooper – vocals
- Dick Wagner – acoustic and electric guitar, vocals
- Steve Hunter – guitar
- John Tropea – guitar
- Bob Ezrin – piano, Fender Rhodes, synthesizer, vocals
- Tony Levin – bass
- Allan Schwartzberg – drums
- Jimmy Maelen – percussion

=== Additional personnel ===
- Bob Babbitt – bass on "Go to Hell"
- Jim Gordon – drums on "I'm the Coolest", "I'm Always Chasing Rainbows" and "Going Home"
- Dick Berg – French horn on "I Never Cry"
- Bill Misener, Colina Phillips, Denny Vosburgh, Laurel Ward, Michael Sherman, Sharon Lee Williams, Shawne Jackson, Shep Gordon, Joe Gannon – vocals
- Allan Macmillan, Bob Ezrin, Dick Wagner, John Tropea, The Hollywood Vampires – arrangements

=== Technical ===
- Brian Christian, Corky Stasiak, Jim Frank, John Jansen, Ringo Hrycyna – recording
- Brian Hagiwara, Rod Dyer – design
- Bret Lopez – photography

== Charts ==
=== Weekly charts ===
Chart (1976)	Peak position
Australian Albums (Kent Music Report)	4
Canada Top Albums/CDs (RPM)	23
Swedish Albums (Sverigetopplistan)	47
UK Albums (Official Charts)	23
US Billboard 200	27

=== Year-end charts ===
Chart (1976)	Peak position
Australian Albums (Kent Music Report)	13
Canada Top Albums/CDs (RPM)	97

== Certifications ==
Region	Certification	Certified units/sales
Canada (Music Canada)	Platinum	100,000^{^}
United States (RIAA)	Gold	500,000^{^}
^{^} Shipments figures based on certification alone.

== Cover versions ==
"Go to Hell" was covered by Dee Snider, Zakk Wylde, Bob Kulick, Rudy Sarzo, Frankie Banali and Paul Taylor on the 1999 tribute album Humanary Stew: A Tribute to Alice Cooper. Also, was included on the 2009 videogame Grand Theft Auto IV: The Lost and Damned on the fictitious station Liberty Rock Radio.
