= Steve Hunter =

American musician (born 1948)

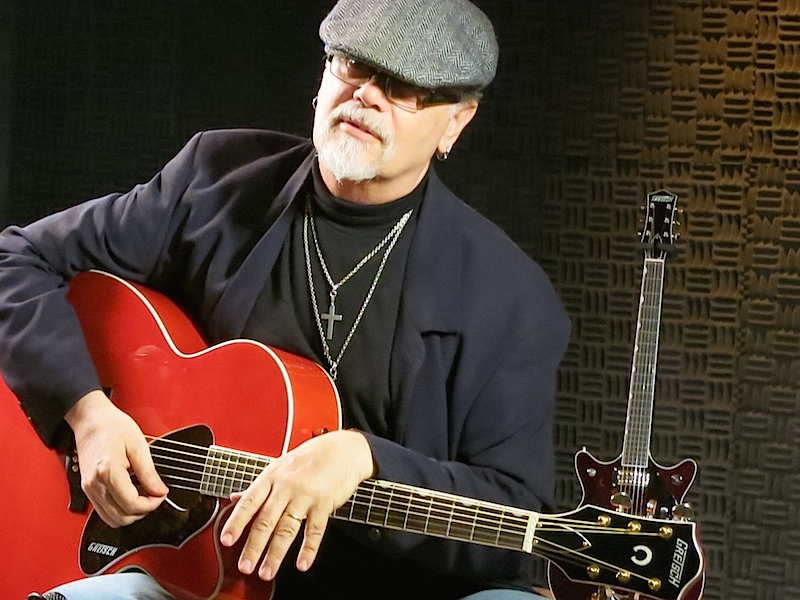
- Hunter in March 2013

Background information
- Also known as: The Deacon
- Born: Stephen John Hunter; June 14, 1948 (age 78); Decatur, Illinois
- Genres: Blues, pop, rock
- Occupation: Musician
- Instrument: Guitar
- Years active: 1971–present
- Labels: Atco, I.R.S.
- Website: Official website

Stephen John Hunter (born June 14, 1948) is an American guitarist, primarily a session player. He has worked with Lou Reed and Alice Cooper, acquiring the moniker "The Deacon". Hunter first played with Mitch Ryder's Detroit, beginning a long association with record producer Bob Ezrin who has said Steve Hunter has contributed so much to rock music in general that he truly deserves the designation of "Guitar Hero". Steve Hunter has played some of the greatest riffs in rock history – the first solo in Aerosmith's "Train Kept A Rollin'" and the acoustic intro on Peter Gabriel's "Solsbury Hill", and he wrote the intro interlude on Lou Reed's live version of "Sweet Jane" on Reed's first gold record (the Rock 'N' Roll Animal live set).

== Early life ==
Steve Hunter was born and raised in Decatur, Illinois. He was first introduced to music when, as a young child, he would listen to country and western music on a Zenith console radio and his father would play the guitar. He watched the Lawrence Welk show on TV at his grandparents' home where he saw Neil LeVang and Buddy Merrill. His grandparents had a Harmonium; his father would pump the organ while Steve sat on his lap and worked out melodies on the keyboard. When he was eight years old, he began taking guitar lessons on a Lap steel guitar. He saw and heard Jerry Byrd play lap steel and learned what could be done on the instrument. Inspired by the music of Chet Atkins, The Ventures and Duane Eddy, Steve eventually switched to standard guitar.

Hunter continued playing guitar throughout high school as a member of a group called the Weejuns, which took their name from G.H. Bass & Co.'s perennially-popular penny loafers. He subsequently joined the Light Brigade, a rock and soul group that played in the Decatur area.

In 1967, during the Vietnam War, Hunter was drafted into the U.S. Army. There he trained as an x-ray technician, ultimately serving at an air evacuation hospital in Okinawa, Japan where Vietnam combat casualties were being treated. He considered becoming a doctor but he enjoyed music so much he knew he would follow a career in music.

Upon completion of his service in the Army, he returned to Decatur where he built a reputation as an outstanding guitar player.

One day he got a telephone call from his Decatur friend, John "Polar Bear" Sauter, that changed his life.

== Career ==
Hunter has had a 50-year career as a session musician, band member and as a solo performer.

=== Work with Mitch Ryder ===
John Sauter called Hunter to tell him that he was playing with Mitch Ryder in Detroit and that Ryder was auditioning for guitar players. He suggested that Hunter come to Detroit and try out. Hunter packed up his guitar and made the eight-hour drive to Detroit. Hunter made the cut and became part of Mitch Ryder's new band Detroit. There Hunter met and formed a long-time professional association with producer Bob Ezrin. Detroit released one self-titled album on Paramount Records. They had a hit with a cover of Lou Reed's "Rock & Roll". Reed was so impressed with Hunter's arrangement and performance on that song that he recruited Hunter to join his band.

=== Work with Alice Cooper ===
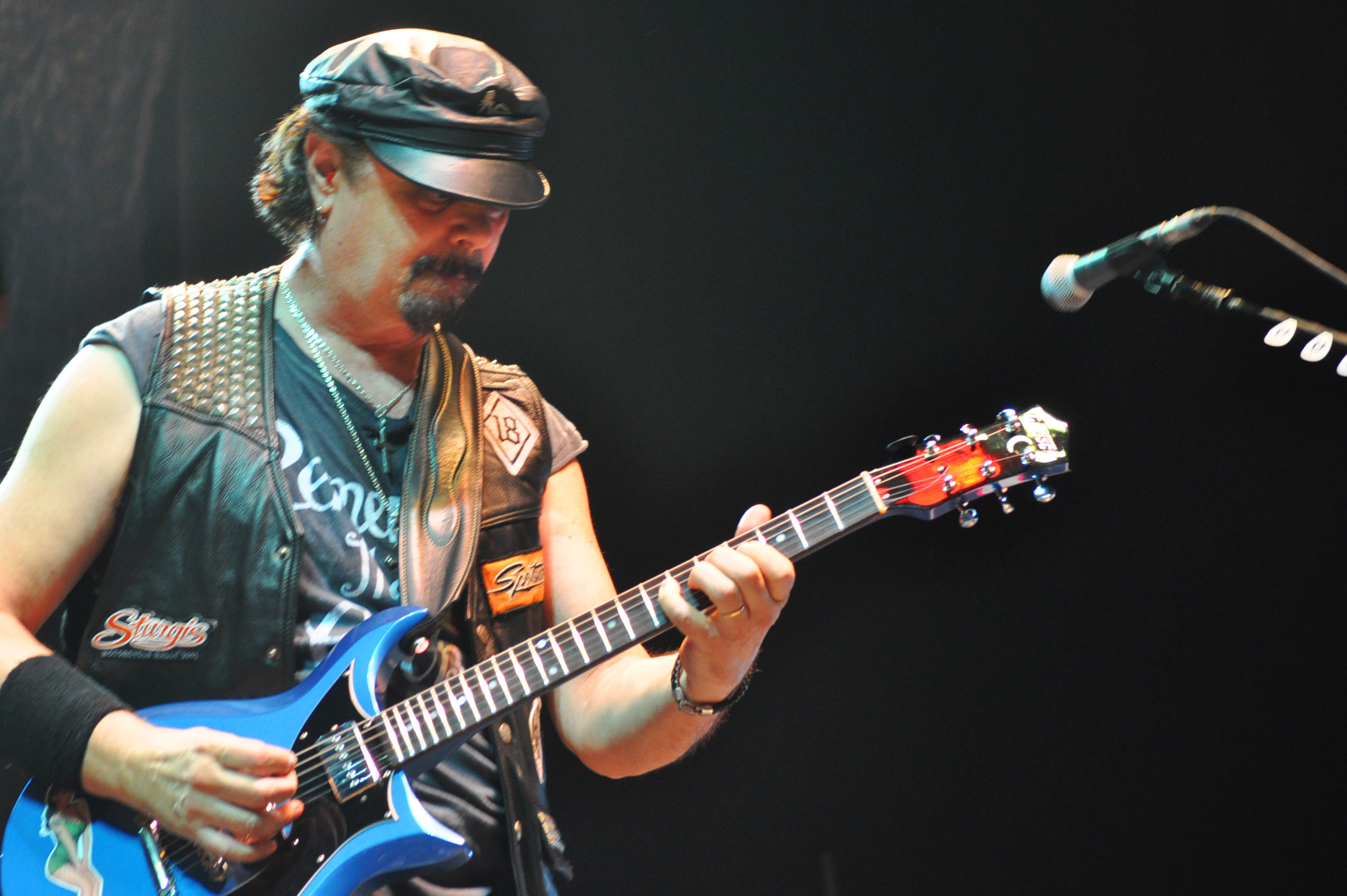
Steve Hunter with Alice Cooper in Rennes, France in 2011

In the 1970s, he appeared on five Alice Cooper albums, all of which were produced by Ezrin. His first recording with Cooper was in 1973 as a session musician on the second-to-last and most successful album recorded by the Alice Cooper Group, Billion Dollar Babies. When Alice Cooper became a solo artist, Hunter followed and appeared on the 1975 groundbreaking album and live show Welcome to My Nightmare alongside guitarist Dick Wagner as seen in the film Welcome to My Nightmare. Released on home video in 1976, it features the celebrated guitar face-off between Hunter and Wagner that formed part of Cooper's 1975 live show. In 2010, Hunter also worked on the basic tracks and solos for Cooper's album Welcome 2 My Nightmare, touring with Cooper throughout 2011 on the No More Mr. Nice Guy Tour. Steve notched up his ninth Alice Cooper release with Paranormal, released in 2017.

=== Work with Lou Reed ===
His first collaboration with Lou Reed was for the Berlin album. He also played with Dick Wagner in the band captured on Reed's live albums, Rock 'n' Roll Animal and Lou Reed Live, including the "Intro" to "Sweet Jane", which was composed by Hunter, who plays the solo up to Lou walking on stage. In 2006, Reed and Hunter presented a new live version of Berlin, released in 2008 as a DVD and CD Berlin: Live at St. Ann's Warehouse.

=== Work with Aerosmith ===
In 1974, he played the (uncredited) opening-half solo on Aerosmith's "Train Kept a Rollin" from Get Your Wings. In a February 2015 interview in Detroit Rock N Roll Magazine Hunter tells how it came about that he recorded that solo: "Aerosmith was in Studio C of The Record Plant and I was doing work with Bob Ezrin in Studio A. I had a long wait between dubs and was waiting in the lobby. Jack Douglas popped his head out of Studio C and asked 'Hey, do you feel like playing?' I said sure, so I grabbed my guitar and went in. I had two run thru's, then Jack said 'great, that's it!' That turned out to be the opening solos on 'Train Kept A Rollin’'."

=== Work with Jack Bruce, Peter Gabriel and other artists ===
In 1974, shortly after his work with the band on the live Reed albums, Hunter played guitar on former Cream bassist Jack Bruce's solo album Out of the Storm.

He played on Peter Gabriel's self-titled first solo album (1977) that included the classic single "Solsbury Hill" which was likewise produced by Ezrin. He also played on tour with Gabriel for the North American leg and a few shows in the UK during March / April 1977, sharing guitar duties with Robert Fripp.

Other artists Hunter has worked with include David Lee Roth (in the mid-1990s), Julian Lennon, Dr. John, Tracy Chapman and more recently Glen Campbell and 2Cellos. It was while recording Roth's A Little Ain't Enough that Hunter met Jason Becker. Hunter and Becker have remained the best of friends since. He wrote "Camelia", which is featured on the soundtrack of the film The Rose, starring Bette Midler, and performed as part of the backing band. Additionally, he appears in the film Blame it on the Night, a movie co-written by Mick Jagger, featured as one of the guitarists in the band.

=== Solo work ===
Hunter's first solo album, 1977's critically acclaimed Swept Away, was produced by Bob Ezrin.

Hunter opted to leave Alice Cooper's touring band in 2012 to concentrate on solo projects.

His fifth solo album The Manhattan Blues Project was released on April 30, 2013, and features contributions from Joe Satriani, Tony Levin, Johnny Depp, Joe Perry, Marty Friedman, Michael Lee Firkins, Phil Aaberg, 2Cellos and Tommy Henriksen, with background vocals provided by Karen Ann Hunter.

In September 2014, a DVD and soundtrack CD entitled Tone Poems Live was released, featuring Hunter, bassist Tony Levin, pianist Phil Aaberg and drummer Alvino Bennett. In 2017 Steve released a new solo album called Before The Lights Go Out the title making reference to his failing eyesight. A mix of rock and blues, he had his friends Erik Scott, Andy Stoller and Joe Satriani guesting. His wife Karen Hunter performs the only vocal (on the final track) of the album, a cover of "Happy Trails".

A new opportunity arose in 2019 when Steve was invited to score and play on an Audio Book by film director Hamlet Sarkissian, called Lovers In The Fog. A soundtrack of this became available late Summer of 2019.

== Awards ==
- In 2009, Hunter received an Emmy Award for his contribution to the Detroit Free Press Christ Child House multimedia project.
- In June 2015, Hunter was inducted into the Michigan Rock and Roll Legends Hall of Fame.

== Personal life ==
Hunter lives in Altea, Spain, with his wife, Cornish singer/songwriter, Karen Ann Hunter. He suffers from pigmentary glaucoma, which has rendered him legally blind.

== Tours ==
- Mitch Ryder's Detroit 1971
- Chambers Brothers 1972
- Lou Reed, 1973 Rock and Roll Animal
- Alice Cooper, 1975 Welcome to my Nightmare Tour
- Peter Gabriel, 1977 1st Solo World Tour
- Alice Cooper, 1977 King Of The Silver Screen (Lace And Whisky)
- Alice Cooper, 1979 Madhouse Rock Tour (From The Inside)
- MeatLoaf, 1982 MeatLoaf European Tour
- Night of the Guitars, 1988-1989 European Tour
- Little Bob (France) 1989
- Tracy Chapman, Lillith Fair 1997, Telling Stories Tour 2000 Tour
- Tracy Chapman, 1998 Amnesty International
- Mitch Ryder, 2005 German Tour
- Lou Reed, 2007/2008 Berlin Live Tour
- Alice Cooper, 2011 No More Mr. Nice Guy Tour

== Solo discography ==
- 1977 - Swept Away (Atco Records)
- 1989 - The Deacon (I.R.S. Records/No Speak)
- 2008 - Hymns for Guitar (Deacon Records)
- 2008 - Short Stories
- 2013 - The Manhattan Blues Project (Deacon Records)
- 2014 - Tone Poems Live (Singular Recordings/Gokuhi)
- 2017 - Before the Lights Go Out (Deacon Records)
- 2024 - The Deacon Speaks

== Other contributions ==
- 1971 - Detroit (Mitch Ryder)
- 1973 - Berlin (Lou Reed)
- 1973 - Billion Dollar Babies (Alice Cooper)
- 1974 - Alice Cooper's Greatest Hits (Alice Cooper)
- 1974 - Rock 'n' Roll Animal (Lou Reed)
- 1974 - Out of the Storm (Jack Bruce)
- 1974 - Get Your Wings (Aerosmith)
- 1975 - Lou Reed Live (Lou Reed)
- 1975 - Ain't It Good to Have It All (Jim & Ginger)
- 1975 - Hollywood Be Thy Name (Dr. John)
- 1975 - Welcome to My Nightmare (Alice Cooper)
- 1976 - Alice Cooper Goes to Hell (Alice Cooper)
- 1976 - Glass Heart (Allan Rich)
- 1977 - Peter Gabriel (Peter Gabriel)
- 1977 - Lace and Whiskey (Alice Cooper)
- 1977 - The Alice Cooper Show (Alice Cooper)
- 1977 - The Band Milwaukee Made Famous (Bad Boy)
- 1978 - Night Flight (Yvonne Elliman)
- 1980 - The Rose (Bette Midler)
- 1980 - Don't Look Back (Natalie Cole)
- 1980 - Breakwater Cat (Thelma Houston)
- 1989 - H Factor (with Pete Haycock and Derek Holt)
- 1989 - Night of the Guitar Live!
- 1990 - Alive or Nothing (Little Bob)
- 1991 - A Little Ain't Enough (David Lee Roth)
- 1991 - Help Yourself (Julian Lennon)
- 1992 - The Best of Flo & Eddie (Flo & Eddie)
- 1993 - Fit For A King (Tribute to Albert King)
- 1993 - Hats Off To Stevie Ray (L.A. Blues Authority, Vol. III) ("Lenny")
- 1993 - Dodgin' The Dirt (Leslie West)
- 1994 - Your Filthy Little Mouth (David Lee Roth)
- 1996 - Perspective (Jason Becker)
- 2000 - Telling Stories (Tracy Chapman)
- 2002 - Let It Rain (Tracy Chapman)
- 2007 - À croire que c'était pour la vie (Henry Padovani)
- 2008 - Berlin: Live at St. Ann's Warehouse (Lou Reed)
- 2008 - Collection (Jason Becker)
- 2009 - Lollapalooza Live (Lou Reed)
- 2010 - Empty Spaces (Karen Ann Hunter) (Producer)
- 2011 - Welcome 2 My Nightmare (Alice Cooper)
- 2011 - Ghost on the Canvas (Glen Campbell)
- 2012 - No More Mr Nice Guy: Live (Alice Cooper)
- 2013 - In2ition (2Cellos) (Melody on the bonus track "Every Breath You Take")
- 2015 - Tommy! Tommy!! Tommy!!! (Tommy Henriksen)
- 2017 - Paranormal (Alice Cooper) ("Holy Water", "Genuine American Girl", "You and All Of Your Friends")
- 2018 - Triumphant Hearts (Jason Becker) ("Valley of Fire")
- 2019 - Lovers In The Fog (Hamlet Sarkissian Audio Book)
- 2021 - Detroit Stories (Alice Cooper)
