= How You Gonna See Me Now =

- Side A of the US single

Single by Alice Cooper

from the album From the Inside
- B-side: "No Tricks"
- Released: October 9, 1978
- Genre: Soft rock
- Length: 3:45
- Label: Warner Bros. Records 8695
- Songwriters: Alice Cooper, Bernie Taupin, Dick Wagner
- Producer: David Foster

Alice Cooper singles chronology
"School's Out (Live)" (1977)	"How You Gonna See Me Now" (1978)	"From the Inside" (1979)

"How You Gonna See Me Now" is a song written by Alice Cooper, Bernie Taupin, and Dick Wagner, performed by Cooper and produced by David Foster. It was released on Cooper’s album, From the Inside.

The song reached number nine in Australia and the Netherlands. In the U.S., it reached number 12 on the Billboard Hot 100.

The song was a regular part of Cooper’s setlist on the ‘Madhouse Rocks Tour’ supporting From the Inside, but despite its success as a single, “How You Gonna See Me Now” has never been performed live since 1979.

== Chart performance ==
=== Weekly charts ===
Chart (1978–1979)	Peak position
Australia (Kent Music Report)	9
Canadian RPM	16
Netherlands (Single Top 100)	9
New Zealand (RIANZ)	19
UK Singles (OCC)	61
U.S. Billboard Hot 100	12
U.S. Billboard Adult Contemporary	22
U.S. Cashbox Top 100	16

=== Year-end charts ===
Chart (1979)	Rank
Australia (Kent Music Report)	97
Canada	161
U.S. (Joel Whitburn's Pop Annual)	85
US Top Pop Singles (Billboard)	87
