= Bob Lefsetz =

American music critic and blogger

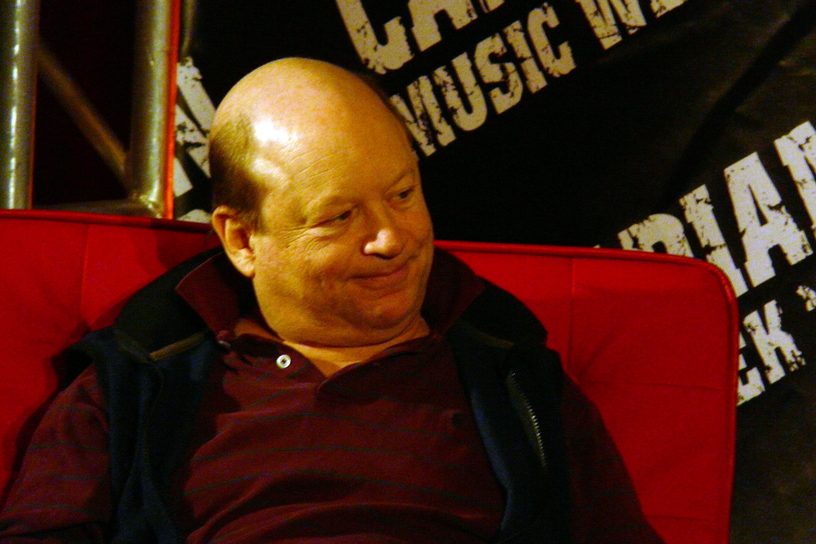
- Bob Lefsetz at Canadian Music Week in Toronto, 2009
- Born: Robert Scott Lefsetz; April 22, 1953 (age 73); Fairfield, Connecticut, U.S.
- Education: Middlebury College; Southwestern Law School (JD)
- Occupations: Music industry analyst and critic

Robert Scott Lefsetz (born April 22, 1953) is an American analyst and critic. He is author of the email newsletter and blog The Lefsetz Letter.

== Background ==
Lefsetz grew up in Fairfield, Connecticut. He is a graduate of Middlebury College, where he majored in art history. He moved to Los Angeles in the 1970s. After earning a J.D. degree from Southwestern Law School, he worked as an entertainment business attorney and briefly as head of Sanctuary Music's American division. He has worked as a consultant to major record labels.

== The Lefsetz Letter ==
The newsletter has tens of thousands of subscribers. From April 2013 through December 2015, Lefsetz wrote a weekly column for Variety's weekly print edition and its website.

== Controversy ==
In 2007, Lefsetz and Kid Rock engaged in an email feud but have since reconciled.

In 2009, Lefsetz and Kiss bassist Gene Simmons exchanged insults via e-mail and in person at the Canadian Music Week conference; they had a debate at the Royal York Hotel in Toronto.

In 2010, American singer-songwriter Taylor Swift released a song titled "Mean" which is rumored to be about Lefsetz and his critical review about her performance at the 52nd Grammy Awards with rock and roll legend Stevie Nicks.
