= Department of Youth (song) =

Single by Alice Cooper

from the album Welcome to My Nightmare
- B-side: "Cold Ethyl" (UK) "Some Folks" (US)
- Released: February 1975 (UK): August 1975 (US)
- Genre: Hard rock
- Length: 2:50
- Label: Atlantic Records 3280
- Songwriter(s): Alice Cooper, Dick Wagner, Bob Ezrin
- Producer(s): Bob Ezrin

Alice Cooper singles chronology
"Only Women Bleed" (1975)	"Department of Youth" (1975)	"Welcome to My Nightmare" (1975)

"Department of Youth" is a song by rock musician Alice Cooper featured on his Welcome to My Nightmare album. The song peaked at No. 67 on The Billboard Hot 100.

== Reception ==
Creem said the song, "is a second cousin to "School's Out" with a chorus of child-things sounding like Cooper's dead babies resurrected to sing back-up vocals." NME agreed it was, "School's Out" all over again, complete with demented kiddie choir and watered-down Clockwork Orange braggadoccio."

Melody Maker wrote, "This is typical, a heavy metal Marc Bolan. It's gritty and gruesome, but underneath the yells and screaming arrangement, it's really just a simple, catchy pop song. Don't analyse it, just bop as Alice screeches his way up the chart."

Record World said that "the supreme spokesman for angry young men everywhere is even more vital and exciting here."

== Charts ==
=== Weekly charts ===
Chart (1975)	Peak position
Australia (Kent Music Report)	7
U.S. (Billboard 100)	67

=== Year-end charts ===
Chart (1975)	Peak position
Australia (Kent Music Report)	35

== Notable covers ==
Pretty Boy Floyd covered the song on their album, Porn Stars.
