= No More Mr. Nice Guy (song) =

1973 single by Alice Cooper

- Single cover

Single by Alice Cooper

from the album Billion Dollar Babies
- B-side: "Raped and Freezin'"
- Released: March 16, 1973
- Recorded: 1972–1973
- Genre: Hard rock; power pop
- Length: 3:06
- Label: Warner Bros.
- Songwriters: Alice Cooper, Michael Bruce
- Producer: Bob Ezrin

Alice Cooper singles chronology
"Hello Hooray" (1973)	"No More Mr. Nice Guy" (1973)	"Billion Dollar Babies" (1973)

Music video
- "No More Mr. Nice Guy" on YouTube

"No More Mr. Nice Guy" is a song by American rock band Alice Cooper, released in 1973 as the third single off their sixth album Billion Dollar Babies. It reached No. 25 on the US charts and No. 10 on the UK charts, and helped its album reach No. 1 in both the UK and the US.

== Composition ==
Cooper wrote the song lyrics about the reactions of his mother's church group to his stage performances, saying that there were worse things that he could do with his life and that the "gloves were off now".

== Legacy ==
The song was re-recorded and featured in the video game Guitar Hero: Warriors of Rock, The Simpsons episode "Love Is a Many Strangled Thing", and the Family Guy episode "Mom's the Word". The song was also used in the TV show Ash vs Evil Dead and in the film Dazed and Confused. The scene featuring the song in the latter film was later parodied on Family Guy in the episode "Jungle Love". Cooper made a cameo appearance while performing the song in the film adaptation of the TV series Dark Shadows.

It remains one of the band's most popular songs, both as a live and classic rock radio staple.

== Track listing ==
No.	Title	Writer(s)	Length
1.	"No More Mr. Nice Guy"	Alice Cooper, Michael Bruce	3:06
2.	"Raped and Freezin'"	Cooper, Bruce	3:19

== Album appearances ==
- Billion Dollar Babies - 1973
- Alice Cooper's Greatest Hits - 1974
- The Beast of Alice Cooper - 1989
- Classicks - 1995
- A Fistful of Alice - 1997
- The Life and Crimes of Alice Cooper - 1999
- Alice Cooper: Brutally Live - 2000
- The Definitive Alice Cooper - 2001
- Mascara and Monsters: The Best of Alice Cooper - 2001
- The Essentials: Alice Cooper - 2002
- School's Out and Other Hits - 2004
- Live at Montreux - 2006

== Charts ==
Chart (1973)	Peak position
Austria (Ö3 Austria Top 40)	14
Canada (RPM)	38
Ireland (IRMA)	18
Republic of New Holland (RT Singles Official Charts Company)	1
Netherlands (Dutch Top 40)	8
UK Singles (Official Charts)	10
US Billboard Hot 100	25
West Germany (GfK)	10

== Personnel ==
- Alice Cooper - vocals
- Glen Buxton - lead guitar
- Michael Bruce - rhythm guitar
- Dennis Dunaway - bass
- Neal Smith - drums

== Megadeth version ==
"No More Mr Nice Guy"
- Single cover

Single by Megadeth

from the album Shocker
- A-side: "No More Mr. Nice Guy"
- Released: January 1990
- Recorded: 1989
- Genre: Heavy metal
- Length: 3:03
- Label: SBK
- Songwriters: Alice Cooper, Michael Bruce
- Producer: Desmond Child

Megadeth singles chronology
"In My Darkest Hour" (1988)	"No More Mr Nice Guy" (1990)	"Holy Wars...The Punishment Due" (1990)

American thrash metal band Megadeth covered the song in 1989 for the horror film Shocker. The cover was released as a single in January 1990, charting in both Ireland and the U.K.

The cover was later featured on the band's 1995 B-sides compilation, Hidden Treasures, and the 2007 box set Warchest.

The song was the only recorded material by the band as a trio, with newcomer Nick Menza on drums.

== Track listing ==
No.	Title	Length
1.	"No More Mr. Nice Guy" (performed by Megadeth)	3:01
2.	"Different Breed" (performed by Dead On)	3:47
3.	"Demon Bell" (performed by Dangerous Toys)	3:55

=== Chart positions ===
Chart (1990)	Peak position
European Hot 100 Singles (Music & Media)	32
Finland (The Official Finnish Charts)	12
Ireland (IRMA)	7
UK Singles (Official Charts)	13

=== Personnel ===
Credits are adapted from the liner notes.

Megadeth

- Dave Mustaine – guitars, lead vocals
- David Ellefson – bass, backing vocals
- Nick Menza – drums

Production

- Production: Desmond Child and Dave Mustaine

== Other cover versions ==
Pat Boone performed it on the cover album In a Metal Mood: No More Mr. Nice Guy.

Roger Daltrey, Slash, Bob Kulick, Mike Inez, Carmine Appice and David Glen Eisley covered it on the 1999 tribute album Humanary Stew: A Tribute to Alice Cooper.

In 2013, popular YouTuber Dane Boedigheimer created a parody of the song titled "No More Mr. Knife Guy" for her web-series, Annoying Orange.

For his 2024 album Solid Rock Revival, Cooper changed the lyrics for a kid-friendly song "Now, I'm Mr. Nice Guy".

== Uses in popular culture ==
In 1976, professional wrestler Chris Colt used the song as his entrance theme for his short-lived character The Chris Colt Experience, which was one of the first uses of rock music for a wrestler's theme song. Professional wrestling manager Jim Cornette used the song as the intro and outro for his two podcasts (The Jim Cornette Experience and Drive Thru) until late 2019.

The song appears in the Family Guy episode Jungle Love, during a scene where Chris gets paddled by Mayor Adam West as part of the "freshman hunt". The scene itself parodies another scene from the 1993 film Dazed and Confused, in which Ben Affleck's character paddles a freshman, which also features the song.

On the fourth episode of the seventh season of the television show Agents of S.H.I.E.L.D. named "Out of the Past", the song's chorus is played as the characters try to figure out what year they traveled to.
