= You and Me (Alice Cooper song) =

1977 single by Alice Cooper

Single by Alice Cooper

from the album Lace and Whiskey
- B-side: "It's Hot Tonight"
- Released: April 1977 (US): July 22, 1977 (UK)
- Genre: Soft rock
- Length: 5:09 (album version); 3:25 (single edit)
- Label: Warner Bros. Records
- Songwriters: Alice Cooper, Dick Wagner
- Producer: Bob Ezrin

Alice Cooper singles chronology
"I Never Cry" (1976)	"You and Me" (1977)	"(No More) Love at Your Convenience" (1977)

"You and Me" is a song by American singer Alice Cooper, released in 1977 as the lead single from his album Lace and Whiskey. The song is a soft rock ballad, reaching number nine on the US Billboard Hot 100 and number eight on the Cash Box Top 100 in the summer of 1977. The song reached number three in Canada and number two in Australia, where it is ranked as the 13th biggest hit of 1977.

The song turned out to be Cooper's last US top-ten hit until "Poison" 12 years later.

Cooper regularly performed "You and Me" live on his 1977 and 1978 concert tours. He also performed the song on The Muppet Show in 1978, as a duet with a female monster who turned out to be Miss Piggy.

== Chart performance ==
=== Weekly charts ===
Chart (1977)	Peak position
Australia (Kent Music Report)	2
Canadian RPM Top Singles	3
Canadian RPM Adult Contemporary	12
France (IFOP)	45
New Zealand (RIANZ)	21
U.S. Billboard Hot 100	9
U.S. Billboard Adult Contemporary	23
U.S. Cashbox Top 100	8

=== Year-end charts ===
Chart (1977)	Rank
Australia	13
Canada	47
U.S. Billboard Hot 100	48
U.S. Cash Box	25
