= The Frost =

American psychedelic rock band

- Origin: Detroit, Michigan, United States
- Genres: Psychedelic rock; rock
- Years active: 1968-1970
- Label: Vanguard
- Past members: Dick Wagner; Gordy Garris; Bob Rigg; Don Hartman

The Frost was an American psychedelic rock band from Alpena, Michigan in the late 1960s, led by singer-guitarist Dick Wagner, who went on to play with Ursa Major, Lou Reed, Alice Cooper, Peter Gabriel in the 1970s. The rest of the band consisted of Gordy Garris (bass guitar), Bob Rigg (drums), and Don Hartman (guitar).

== History ==
The band formed from the remains of The Bossmen. Dick Wagner had just been rejected from the band Blood, Sweat, and Tears so he fully devoted his time to The Frost. The band's first large-scale performance came at Meadowbrook Theatre in front of a crowd of 10,000. MC5 and The Stooges were also performing but the Frost was noted as being a standout among the rest.

Record companies heavily pursued the band for a record deal as they noticed their growing popularity. The Frost recorded three albums for Vanguard Records: Frost Music, Rock and Roll Music, and Through the Eyes of Love.

The Frost were one of the top Detroit area bands of the era; however, substandard album cover artwork and poor distribution and promotion by Vanguard hampered the band, causing them to miss the national success that other bands like Ann Arbor's Bob Seger, Detroit's Ted Nugent and Flint's Grand Funk Railroad were to achieve.

There have been several Frost reunion concerts over the years, especially while Wagner still lived and performed in Michigan. The reunions have included Wagner, Hartman and Rigg.

The Frost was voted into the Michigan Rock and Roll Legends Hall of Fame in 2008.

== Lineup ==
Dick Wagner: Guitar, vocals
Don Hartman: Guitar, vocals
Gordy Garris: Bass guitar
Bob Rigg: Drums

== Discography ==
=== Singles ===
- "A Rainy Day" / "Bad Girl" 1967 (Date 1577) - as Dick Wagner and The Frosts
- "Sunshine" / "Little Girl" 1968 (Date 1596) - as Dick Wagner and The Frosts
- "Mystery Man" / "Stand in the Shadows" 1969 (Vanguard 35089)
- "Sweet Lady Love" / "Linda" 1969 (Vanguard 35099)
- "Rock and Roll Music" / "Donny's Blues" 1969 (Vanguard 35101)
- "Help Me Baby / Black Train" 1970 (Vanguard [France] 119020)
- "Black as Night" / "A Long Way from Home" 1970 (Vanguard 35115)

=== Albums ===
- Frost Music 1969 (Vanguard VSD-6520)
- Rock and Roll Music 1969 (Vanguard VSD-6541)
- Through the Eyes of Love 1970 (Vanguard VSD-6556)
- Live at the Grande Ballroom 1969 2001 (Vanguard [Italy] VSD-6553)

=== Compilation albums ===
- Early Frost 1978 (Vanguard VSD-79392)
