= Dick Wagner =

American guitarist (1942–2014)

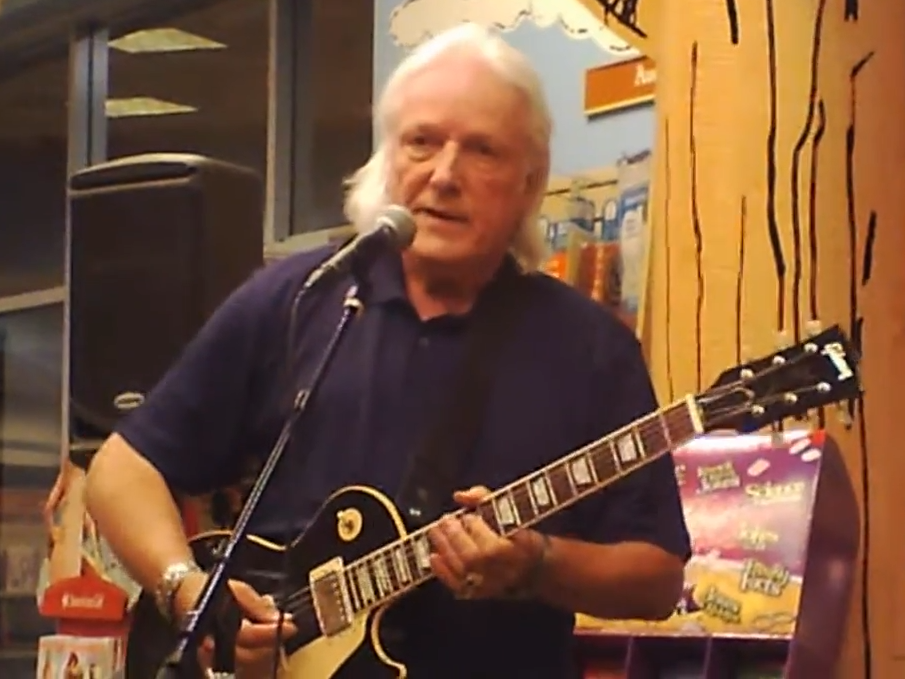
- Wagner in 2012

Background information
- Born: Richard Allen Wagner; December 14, 1942; Oelwein, Iowa, U.S.
- Died: July 30, 2014 (aged 71) Phoenix, Arizona, U.S.
- Genres: Hard rock; acid rock; heavy metal; shock rock
- Occupations: Musician; songwriter; record producer; author
- Instruments: Guitar; vocals
- Years active: 1964–2014
- Formerly of: The Frost; Ursa Major; The Bossmen
- Website: wagnermusic.com notonlywomenbleed.com

Richard Allen Wagner (December 14, 1942 – July 30, 2014) was an American rock guitarist, songwriter and author best known for his work with Alice Cooper, Lou Reed, and Kiss. He also fronted his own Michigan-based bands, the Frost and the Bossmen.

== Performing career ==
Born in Oelwein, Iowa, Wagner grew up in the Owosso, Michigan, area and graduated from Waterford Township high school in 1961. His first band, called the Bossmen, was a favorite in the Detroit area and scored radio play with the Wagner-penned composition "Baby Boy", "You're the Girl for Me" and others. Wagner formed his next band, the Frost, with Donny Hartman, Bobby Rigg and Gordy Garris, in the late 1960s and built up a substantial following in the Michigan area. The band featured the dual lead guitars of Wagner and Hartman. The band released three studio albums during their tenure together on Vanguard Records: 1969's Frost Music and Rock and Roll Music, plus 1970's Through the Eyes of Love. Wagner was the principal songwriter, arranger and lead vocalist of the Frost. Their live appearances brought out large crowds of young fans throughout the region.

In 1972, Wagner moved to New York and formed the short-lived group "Ursa Major". The original line-up included Billy Joel on keyboards and Rick Mangone on drums. As Billy Joel had to leave the band for personal reasons, Wagner replaced him with former Amboy Dukes bassist Greg Arama. They released one seminal, acclaimed self-titled studio album as a power trio. The band toured nationally with Jeff Beck and then with Alice Cooper.

In 1973, Wagner was recruited by producer Bob Ezrin for Lou Reed's band along with Steve Hunter. Wagner and Hunter were featured guitarists on Reed's dark and controversial third solo studio album, Berlin (1973). Soon after, Wagner and Hunter were joined by Prakash John, Pentti "Whitey" Glan and Ray Colcord for Reed's Rock 'n' Roll Animal Tour. As band leader and arranger, Wagner took the early Reed songs that had been recorded by the Velvet Underground and rearranged them for the concert stage. The new arrangements left behind the laid back feeling that had been established by the prior Reed band and won Reed his first gold album. The band toured internationally with Reed, culminating in the album Rock 'n' Roll Animal (1974), recorded live at the New York Academy of Music in December 1973. Readers of Guitar World ranked the Hunter/Wagner solos on the 1973 live version of "Sweet Jane" 81st among the 100 Greatest Guitar Solos of all time.

It was during Wagner's days with the Frost that he first met Alice Cooper. Producer Bob Ezrin brought both Wagner and Steve Hunter into the studio to play guitar on the early Alice Cooper albums. Wagner had already been featured on the band's fifth studio album School's Out (1972), notably for playing the memorable guitar solo on the track "My Stars". Wagner continued to play lead guitar (sometimes uncredited) on every Alice Cooper band album that followed, through the break-up of the original group.

When the members of the original Alice Cooper group parted ways in 1974, Wagner officially teamed up with Alice Cooper and became his principal co-writer, lead guitarist and band director. Together they wrote their first concept album, Welcome to My Nightmare. Produced by Bob Ezrin, the album was released in 1975. The Nightmare Tour became the largest and longest touring rock show of the time. The live show also featured the dueling lead guitars of Wagner and Hunter in a guitar battle captured in the film of the same name. The film became a TV special and was later released on home video in 1976. The world tour covered more than 120 cities over an eighteen-month period. Wagner continued to co-write songs and play lead guitar on additional Cooper albums, including: Goes to Hell (1976), The Alice Cooper Show (1977), Lace and Whiskey (1977), From the Inside (1978; written by the team of Alice Cooper, Dick Wagner and Bernie Taupin), Zipper Catches Skin (1982), DaDa (1983) and Hey Stoopid (1991) among others.

At the suggestion of producer Bob Ezrin, Wagner contributed guitar tracks to the highly successful fourth studio album by Kiss, Destroyer (1976) – the first Kiss album to prominently feature outside musicians. Though uncredited, Wagner replaced Ace Frehley as lead guitarist for the tracks "Flaming Youth" (only guitar licks) and "Sweet Pain" (guitar solo), while also playing the acoustic guitar found on the ballad "Beth". As one of Ezrin's hired guns throughout much of the 1970s and 1980s, Wagner continued to lend his playing (and in some cases, songwriting) talents to albums including Peter Gabriel's self-titled solo debut (1977), Air Supply, Aerosmith's Get Your Wings (1974; Wagner played the guitar solos on "Same Old Song and Dance" and "Train Kept A-Rollin'", the latter with Steve Hunter), Hall & Oates' Along the Red Ledge (1978), Kiss's Revenge (1992), and Burton Cummings' Dream of a Child (1978). Wagner produced and co-wrote songs for Mark Farner's solo debut and a pair of albums for the star of The Rocky Horror Picture Show, Tim Curry, and more.

In 1978, Wagner released a solo studio album called Richard Wagner, produced by Bob Ezrin, and released on Atlantic Records. The album title confused both record stores and disc jockeys, who relegated the record to the classical music bin, assuming it was a classical music record composed by the 19th-century classical composer with the same name.

== Songwriting credits ==
One of the best-known songs written by Wagner is "Only Women Bleed". Written during Wagner's days with the Frost and titled "Movin' On", Wagner was unhappy with his lyrics and did not release it. After starting his collaboration with Alice Cooper, Wagner played the song for him. Alice had a title for a song he had been wanting to write. While keeping the main riff and vocal melodies, Cooper and Wagner penned new lyrics and recorded it for Cooper's debut solo studio album Welcome to My Nightmare. The song delivered a message against domestic violence. Since its initial release in 1975 "Only Women Bleed" has been covered by more than 30 artists, including Tina Turner, Etta James, Guns N' Roses, Lita Ford, Carmen McRae and Tori Amos.

Following "Only Women Bleed", Wagner co-wrote a series of hit power ballads with Alice Cooper, including "I Never Cry", "You and Me" and "How You Gonna See Me Now" (the latter written by Cooper, Wagner and Bernie Taupin). Other songs co-written by Wagner brought him public recognition as a songwriting talent. First "Shine Silently" with Nils Lofgren, who performed it originally on his fifth solo studio album Nils (1979), then as part of Ringo Starr & His All-Starr Band's 1990 eponymous first live album. "Just as I Am", written by Wagner with Rob Hegel, was a Top 20 hit for Air Supply. At the behest of producer Bob Ezrin, Wagner flew to Toronto and recorded guitar on seven tracks of the Air Supply studio album that included this song. Another power ballad, "I Might As Well Be on Mars", again with Alice Cooper, was featured on Cooper's twelfth solo studio album Hey Stoopid (1991). With Ezrin as Producer, Wagner in 1989 collaborated with Tim Curry on several tracks for Curry's first solo album FEARLESS, which also featured the music of Michael Kamen. Notable was Wagner's solo writing credit for Curry's song S.O.S. and the tracks demonstrate songwriting craft that extended beyond Wagner's rock resume, often as heartfelt if not as impactful as "Only Women Bleed" or "Remember the Child."

"Remember the Child" is one of the songs Wagner was most proud of, written to address the issue of child abuse. Written from the point of view of a child, the lyrics and song melody deliver a powerful and poignant message to adults that a child will forever remember the love or abuse of their childhood. New York Times best selling author John Bradshaw selected "Remember the Child" as the theme song for his award-winning PBS television special, "Homecoming: Reclaiming and Healing Your Inner Child". Bradshaw invited Wagner to join him on his nationwide tour to perform the song as a cathartic and healing piece of music to the thousands who attended Bradshaw's lectures and seminars. Embraced by psychiatrists and psychologists in their practices, the song has been used as a tool to evoke emotion from patients who are unable to express feelings. In 1996, Wagner was invited by Leo Najar, conductor of the Saginaw Bay Symphony Orchestra to perform a two and a half hour concert of his songs with the symphony. Wagner entitled the concert, The Remember the Child Concert, raising funds for child abuse agencies in central Michigan through his Remember the Child Foundation.

== Later life and career ==
Wagner moved to Phoenix, Arizona, in 2005 where he was writing a new studio album with Alan Gordon (Happy Together, Celebrate). In 2007 he wrote songs for the artist Wednesday for her debut studio album Torch Rock, released on his independent record label Desert Dreams Records. Because of the efforts of his career strategist and publicist Al Gomes, Wednesday's studio album, produced by Wagner, was placed on the official ballot by The Recording Academy for the 52nd Annual Grammy Awards for Record of the Year and Best Female Pop Vocal Performance. Three years later, Gomes assisted in getting Wagner and songwriting partner Alice Cooper's song "Something to Remember Me By" (from 2011's Welcome 2 My Nightmare) placed on the 55th Annual Grammy Awards ballot for Best Rock Performance and Best Rock Song.

A film about the work of Dick Wagner and Steve Hunter, titled Rock and Roll Animals, was in production in 2007 by Noble Savage Productions. In filmed interviews, Alice Cooper talks about hiring Dick Wagner, writing with him and hiring the greatest guitar players to be in his band. Fred Mandel, keyboardist with the Alice Cooper Band was also interviewed. The film was never completed, but the clips are on YouTube.

In 2006, Wagner cooperated with the Italian rock singer Chris Catena in recording a cover version of "Theme for an Imaginary Western", the famous rock song by Jack Bruce and Pete Brown, which will be released in the third studio album of the Italian singer around 2015.

In 2007, Wagner suffered a massive heart attack and stroke. After arriving DOA at a Scottsdale hospital, he spent two weeks in a coma, awakening with a paralyzed left arm. While recovering from his heart attack, Wagner continued to write songs and began writing his memoirs, which ultimately became his book, Not Only Women Bleed (2011).

As he slowly recovered from his heart attack and stroke, Wagner manifested unusual symptoms, including difficulty walking and concentrating, loss of balance, and symptoms of dementia, threatening his music career and his life. In 2011, Wagner was diagnosed with normal pressure hydrocephalus (NPH), a type of dementia which affects, among other things, fine motor skills and gait. In late 2011, after successful surgery at Barrow Neurological Hospital in Phoenix, Arizona, Wagner was able to make a significant recovery, regaining almost all of the dexterity which had been lost over the course of the disorder's progression.

Wagner's former band the Frost was voted into the Michigan Rock and Roll Legends online Hall of Fame in 2008. The group's recording of "Mystery Man", a Wagner composition, was voted a Legendary Michigan Song in 2009. He continued to recover from his near-fatal heart attack and recorded with long-time collaborator Steve Hunter on an unnamed single for Wednesday.

Wagner released a new solo studio album in October 2009, titled Full Meltdown on Desert Dreams Records. It features 15 lost and newly discovered songs recorded by Wagner between 1979 and 1995. He also produced the band Warsaw Pact and the independent artist Brandon Bullard with releases from both in early 2010. Wagner scored with Alice Cooper and the British funk rock band the Velvet Hearts the soundtrack to the Indie horror film Silas Gore, A Film Trilogy (2010). Similar to his original work on the debut Alice Cooper solo studio album Welcome to My Nightmare, Wagner also contributed lead guitar to the final track, "The Underture", from the album Welcome 2 My Nightmare (2011). It represents instrumental versions of several songs from each album.

In 2010, Gibson honored the guitar tandem of Dick Wagner and Steve Hunter with two places in the Top 50 Guitar Solos of All Time - #25 for "Intro to Sweet Jane" (Lou Reed), and as #41 "Train Kept A Rollin' (Aerosmith). In 2012, Gibson published Riff This Way: Aerosmith's Top 10 Riff-Heavy Tracks, placing Dick Wagner with two winning guitar solos: The #1 Best Aerosmith Guitar Solo for his lead guitar on "Same Old Song and Dance", and also #4, honoring his performance as lead guitarist with Steve Hunter on "Train Kept A Rollin'". Wagner won a number of BMI Songwriter awards and other international music awards and his work has been featured on albums earning more than 35 gold and platinum records.

In 2011, Wagner's memoirs, Not Only Women Bleed, Vignettes from the Heart of a Rock Musician, were released to tremendous acclaim, spending more than two weeks at No. 1 on Amazon's Hot New Releases in Biographies & Memoirs of Entertainers. His book has won five international book awards.

In 2012, Wagner was voted into the Michigan Rock and Roll Legends Hall of Fame.

The same year, Wagner joined forces with the Mugshots - the only European band ever produced by the musician - and spent two weeks in Italy to produce their acclaimed release "Love, Lust and Revenge" (GCM Music/Alka Records/Black Widow Records), on which he is featured as lead guitarist as well. Susan Michelson is featured as associated producer, British ladies Never the Bride provided backing vocals, American actress Suzi Lorraine is featured on the cover. The record was then mixed in Phoenix by Otto D'Agnolo at Chaton Studios, and mastered by Wagner's longtime friend and collaborator, Gil Markle. The Mugshots - "a majestic Euro-American combination of classic rock and dark stories" in the musician's words - are known to be the only band to have recorded a cover version of "Pass the Gun Around", written by Wagner back in 1983 for Alice Cooper's eighth solo studio album DaDa.

In 2013 and 2014, after suffering more than six years of extreme health adversities: two heart attacks, a stroke, a paralyzed left arm, a diagnosis of hydrocephalus (NPH) two brain surgeries, a pacemaker and more, Wagner's guitar playing facilities had returned, and he fully resumed performing, touring with the Dick Wagner Band, writing songs and producing music. His book tour for Not Only Women Bleed took him to more than 40 states. With personal appearances in documentary films and writing film scores, Wagner had three songs featured in the multi-award-winning documentary "Louder than Love" (including the opening song and the closing credits song). Leading up to his death, Wagner's projects included producing and writing for Danish rock star, Maryann Cotton, in a concept album and TV project reminiscent of Wagner's shock rock history, a featuring in the forthcoming third solo album of the Italian rocker Chris Catena, entitled Return of the Freak.

On July 30, 2014, Wagner died of respiratory failure at the age of 71.

== Charitable contributions ==
In November 2013, Wagner released his song and video tribute, "If I Had the Time (I Could Change the World)", on various digital download sites to raise money for St. Jude Children's Research Hospital. Wagner gathered more than 50 musicians to record at Sunset Sound Recorders in Los Angeles, including Mark Farner on lead vocals; Danny Seraphine on drums; Leland Sklar; Fred Mandel on piano; Elliot Easton; Jennifer Batten; Merrilee Rush; and Trini Lopez and Laurie Beebe Lewis on lead vocals.

In November 2011 Wagner, along with Detroit musicians Ray Goodman, Dennis Burr, Prakash John, Jim McCarty, Johnny Bee Badanjek, Jimmie Bones, Ty Stone, Robert Wagner, Muruga and Pat Lewis, recorded Motor City Music at Harmonie Park Studios in Detroit in support of Franciscan friar Brother Al Mascia's "Bicycle Ministry." Mascia pedals a bicycle cart around the streets of downtown Detroit, delivering hot drinks, food and warm clothing to the homeless. The donated proceeds enable Brother Al to purchase additional supplies.

Wagner was also the First Artist Ambassador for Guitars for Vets.

Recovering from hydrocephalus, Wagner became a National Spokesperson for Hydrocephalus.org.

To support awareness of violence against women and children, Wagner and his production company, Desert Dreams Productions, created a video featuring Desert Dreams artist, Wednesday, performing her gospel-inflected version of "Only Women Bleed," at Alice Cooper's Christmas Pudding Show in Phoenix, Arizona. Footage from her performance, featuring Wagner on guitar, was interspersed with researched data on abuse among a variety of age groups and cultures, along with empowering photos of women from around the world.

Following Wagner's death in 2014, his son Robert and Remember the Child Fund chairperson Susan Michelson have carried on his legacy of supporting children's charities, organizing the Dick Wagner "Remember the Child" Memorial Concert in Detroit. The annual concert event, which benefits Children's Miracle Network Hospitals and St. Jude Children's Research Hospital, ran for three years (2015 through 2017), and was revived in 2026.

== Discography ==
The Bossmen

- Personally Yours: The Complete Anthology of the Bossmen (Compilation)

The Frost

- Frost Music 1969 (Vanguard VSD-6520)
- Rock and Roll Music 1969 (Vanguard VSD-6541)
- Through the Eyes of Love 1970 (Vanguard VSD-6556)
- Live at the Grande Ballroom 1969 2001 (Vanguard VSD-6553)

- Early Frost 1969 (Compilation) (Vanguard VSD 79392)

Ursa Major

- Ursa Major (1972)

Alice Cooper (band)

- School's Out (1972)
- Billion Dollar Babies (1973)
- Muscle of Love (1973)

Alice Cooper (solo)

- Welcome to My Nightmare (1975)
- Alice Cooper Goes to Hell (1976)
- Lace and Whiskey (1977)
- The Alice Cooper Show (1977)
- From the Inside (1978)
- Zipper Catches Skin (1982)
- DaDa (1983)
- Hey Stoopid (1991) (co-songwriting on one track only)
- Welcome 2 My Nightmare (2011)

Lou Reed

- Berlin (1973)
- Rock 'n' Roll Animal (1974)
- Lou Reed Live (1975)

Kiss

- Destroyer (1976)
- Revenge (1992)

Aerosmith

- Get Your Wings (1974)
- Toys in the Attic (1975)

The Throbs

- The Language of Thieves and Vagabonds (as co-producer) (1991)

Solo

- Dick Wagner (originally released as Richard Wagner) (1978)
- Rock History (1999)
- Home at Last Vol. 1 and Vol. 2 (2008)
- Remember the Child (2008)
- Full Meltdown (compilation of unreleased recordings) (2009)
- Captured (2014)

Meat Loaf

- Midnight at the Lost and Found (1983) (songwriting credit for 'Fallen Angel')

Chris Catena's Rock City Tribe

- Truth in Unity (2020) (lead guitar in the song "Theme from an Imaginary Western" recorded in 2006)
