= Only Women Bleed =

1975 song by Alice Cooper

Single by Alice Cooper

from the album Welcome to My Nightmare
- B-side: "Cold Ethyl" (US) "Devil's Food" (Europe)
- Released: March 1975 (US); June 1975 (Europe)
- Genre: Soft rock
- Length: 5:50 (album version); 3:31 (single version)
- Label: Atlantic
- Songwriters: Alice Cooper; Dick Wagner
- Producer: Bob Ezrin

Alice Cooper singles chronology
"Muscle of Love" (1974)	"Only Women Bleed" (1975)	"Department of Youth" (1975)

Official audio
- "Only Women Bleed" on YouTube

"Only Women Bleed" is a song by American rock singer Alice Cooper, released on his debut solo studio album Welcome to My Nightmare (1975). It was written by Cooper and Dick Wagner and was the second single from the album to be released.

== Background ==
It is a ballad about a woman in an abusive marriage. The song is often mistakenly presumed to be about menstruation, and that has limited its play on radio and in other public forums. As a single by Cooper, it was released as just "Only Women".

Prior to the release of Welcome to My Nightmare in the US, a shortened version of the song was released as a single and was alternatively titled "Only Women" by Atlantic Records due to protests by feminist groups. The album version of the song features more orchestral movements than the single, and also runs longer than the 45 at 5:49.

According to co-writer Dick Wagner, the song's musical riff and vocal melody were developed several years earlier during his tenure with the late-1960s Michigan-based band the Frost, but Wagner had never liked his lyrics and the song was never recorded. He played the riff for Cooper, and the two developed new lyrics for the eventual Welcome to My Nightmare recording.

== Critical reception ==
Billboard staff responded warmly to this single. The lyric of it was described as "stunning". Record World called it "a ballad with a surprisingly international flavor" and said that "Alice's new sound should prove a soft touch for reaching his widest audience yet!" Beverley Legge of British weekly magazine Disc in his review of 5 July 1975 supposed that the listeners could be shocked by "subdued" sound of Cooper. As per him "the song is a fairly harmless lament about downtrodden maidens" and "quite unlike anything he's done before". Legge considered "change of style has worked" and named song "definitely one of the outstanding tracks" on the album. The B-side song of European release, "Devil's Food", was also taken from the album. Its sound was more similar to the well-known style of Alice Cooper band, "packed with snarling vocals, angry guitar licks and plenty of phasing, making it a total contrast from the other track."

== Chart performance ==
It is one of Cooper's biggest hits, reaching number 1 on the Canadian RPM national singles chart and number 12 on the US Billboard Hot 100 singles chart in 1975. It is from his solo studio album Welcome to My Nightmare. It was the first of several ballad releases by Cooper that reached the top 20 of the Hot 100 singles chart.

=== Weekly charts ===
Chart (1975)	Peak position
Australia (Kent Music Report)	50
Canadian RPM Top Singles	1
New Zealand (RIANZ)	21
US Billboard Hot 100	12
US Cash Box Top 100	10

=== Year-end charts ===
Chart (1975)	Rank
Canada	21
US Billboard Hot 100	63

== Julie Covington version ==
Julie Covington's cover version of the song reached #12 on the UK Singles Chart when it was released as a single in 1977. It was later included on the 2000 re-release of her eponymous 1978 studio album.

== Other cover versions ==
Other cover versions include Guns N' Roses, Lita Ford, Glenn Hughes, and Ike & Tina Turner. A cover by the band Favorite Angel would peak at number 69 on the Hot 100 in September 1990.

Finnish musician Heikki "Hector" Harma made the Finnish translation Nainen yksin on ("Woman Is Alone") of the song in 1978. The Finnish lyrics follow the originals rather well.
