= Bob Ezrin =

Canadian music producer

Bob Ezrin OC
- Born: Robert Alan Ezrin; March 25, 1949 (age 77); Toronto, Ontario, Canada
- Education: University of Toronto Schools
- Genres: Pop rock; progressive rock; hard rock; heavy metal
- Occupations: Record producer; musician
- Instruments: Piano; keyboards; bass guitar; vocals
- Years active: 1970–present

Robert Alan Ezrin (born March 25, 1949) is a Canadian record producer and keyboardist, best known for his work with Lou Reed, Alice Cooper, Aerosmith, Kiss, Pink Floyd, Deep Purple, Peter Gabriel, Andrea Bocelli and Phish. As of 2010, his career in music had spanned six decades and his production work continued into the 21st century with acts such as Deftones and Thirty Seconds to Mars. He is the winner of three Juno Awards. In 2011, he was awarded the Special Achievement Award at the 2011 SOCAN Awards held in Toronto. On 29 December 2022, Ezrin was named an Officer of the Order of Canada, the second-highest civilian honour in Canada.

== Early life ==
Ezrin was born in Toronto, Ontario, on March 25, 1949 to Jewish parents. He resided in the Forest Hill area of Toronto, and graduated from the University of Toronto Schools in 1967.

== Music and production career ==
As of 2014, Ezrin continued to work as a record producer, arranger and songwriter, in addition to being involved with a variety of other projects in digital media, live production, film, television, and theatrical production.

He has worked on recordings with numerous major artists, including Pink Floyd, Phish, Alice Cooper, Kiss, Balloonatic, Deep Purple, Lou Reed, the Kings, Hanoi Rocks, Taylor Swift, Peter Gabriel, Bonham, K'naan, 2Cellos, Kristin Chenoweth, Rod Stewart, Nine Inch Nails, the Jayhawks, Thirty Seconds to Mars, the Darkness, Jane's Addiction, Dr. John, Nils Lofgren, Berlin, Kansas, Julian Lennon, Joe Bonamassa and Deftones, among many others. Ezrin also recorded the very first demos for Toronto band Max Webster.

Ezrin has been described by Alice Cooper as "our George Martin". Following his first production work on an album with Love It to Death in 1971, Ezrin embarked on a long-term collaboration that, by 1973, would see the release of the number one album Billion Dollar Babies, a year after the success of School's Out; Cooper subsequently became established as one of the biggest acts in the world. After the disbanding of Cooper's group, Ezrin continued his collaboration with Cooper, as the latter embarked upon a solo career. In 1975, Cooper released the Ezrin-produced album, Welcome to My Nightmare. Ezrin worked with Cooper not just as a producer, but also as a co-writer, arranger, and musician.

Ezrin produced the best-selling Kiss album Destroyer in 1976. As explained by Peter Criss during an interview in the documentary KISS: Krazy Killer (1994), Ezrin co-wrote, arranged and performed the piano accompaniment to the song "Beth". He proceeded to produce two other albums with the band — Music from "The Elder" (1981) and Revenge (1992) — and remains close to the band's members.

Ezrin has worked with Pink Floyd on a number of occasions, co-producing the albums The Wall (1979), A Momentary Lapse of Reason (1987), and The Division Bell (1994). He has also co-written the songs "The Trial", "Signs of Life", "Learning to Fly", and "Take It Back".

He also produced the 1988 Kansas album In the Spirit of Things, and received a writing credit for the song "Ghosts" and three other songs.

In May 2009, he co-produced The Clearwater Concert at Madison Square Garden in New York City, celebrating the 90th birthday of musician and social activist Pete Seeger. More than 50 guest artists, including Bruce Springsteen, Dave Matthews, John Mellencamp, Ben Harper, Joan Baez, Tom Morello of Rage Against the Machine, Ani DiFranco, Emmylou Harris, and Kris Kristofferson, performed at the event. Ezrin also co-produced the PBS broadcast of the event.

Since 2010, Ezrin has co-produced Peter Gabriel's album Scratch My Back; co-produced The House Rules, by Christian Kane; and produced singles for K'naan, the Canadian Tenors, and young pop sensation Fefe Dobson for her album Joy. Ezrin reunited with Cooper, working on Cooper's Welcome 2 My Nightmare, on the corresponding live show, and numerous other related projects. He also mixed several projects, including Taylor Swift's Speak Now World Tour – Live CD and DVD (2011), and an album by the Darkness (2012).

In 2012, Ezrin remixed Kiss's 1976 album Destroyer, which by then had gone Double Platinum. He produced albums for 2Cellos and rock legends Deep Purple. He worked with the band Phish on their 2014 release, Fuego. They reunited for the band's next album, Big Boat, released in 2016. Ezrin worked with Andrea Bocelli on Sì, Bocelli's first No. 1 album, both in the UK and USA.

Ezrin produced a live and television extravaganza to reopen the Louisiana Superdome in New Orleans, US, featuring Green Day and U2. He also worked on an album and live opera with Orchestra di Piazza Vittorio in Rome, Italy.

== Other ventures ==
=== Entrepreneurship ===
In 1993, Ezrin co-founded a computer software company called 7th Level, which developed and published educational and entertainment CD-ROMs, including a series of Monty Python games.

In 1999, he co-founded Enigma Digital, an internet radio provider, that was eventually sold to Clear Channel; Ezrin was later appointed vice-chairman of Clear Channel Interactive. Ezrin was also chairman of Live Nation Artists Recordings in 2007 and the first half of 2008.

He is also co-founder and vice chairman of Wow Unlimited Media.

In 2009, Ezrin, along with Garth Richardson and Kevin Williams, co-founded the Nimbus School of Recording Arts in Vancouver. Ezrin stated that his goal was to provide new engineers and producers with the hands-on teaching experience that he believed was no longer available from traditional recording studios.

=== Philanthropy ===
Ezrin is a board member of the Mr. Holland's Opus Foundation, a national initiative that supports music in US schools by donating musical instruments to under-funded music programs. He is also an Advisory Committee member of MusiCounts, the musical education initiative of the Canadian Academy of Recording Arts and Sciences, that provides instruments to Canadian school music programs.

He is co-founder, with U2's the Edge, of Music Rising, an initiative to preserve the musical culture of the Gulf coast region following the damage caused by the hurricanes and flooding of 2005.

On February 18, 2010, Ezrin helped with the mobilization of the Young Artists for Haiti group. Fifty Canadian artists recorded a rendition of hip-hop star K'naan's "Wavin' Flag" for the victims of the Haiti quake. The song was reworked by Ezrin to include specific lyrics for Haiti, with proceeds disseminated to Free the Children, War Child Canada, and World Vision Canada. The production raised over US$2 million. K'naan explained in regard to the initiation of the project: "I got a call from Randy [Lennox, president] at Universal [Music Canada] and Bob Ezrin. They had this idea that they wanted to do something lasting, that actually educates young people in Canada about Haiti and not let the fatigue of the subject wash over everybody and everybody just forget Haiti."

Ezrin is a chairman emeritus of the Los Angeles Mentoring Partnership, and a past trustee and governor of the National Academy of Recording Arts and Sciences (NARAS).

He is a member of the Board of the Canadian Journalism Foundation, which promotes, celebrates and facilitates excellence in journalism.

As of 2022, Ezrin was engaged as a Canadian climate activist.

=== Film and television ===
In 1982, Ezrin briefly appeared as the host of Enterprise, a City-TV panel show that replaced Dr. Morton Shulman's The Shulman File; he has also been a frequent interviewee for documentary films and television. He has created new theatrical, television, and live events with RadicalMedia, based in New York, including Jay-Z's feature film, Fade to Black (2004). In 2012, Ezrin appeared in Artifact, a documentary film about the modern music business focused on the legal battle between Thirty Seconds to Mars and record label EMI.

He is a co-producer of Melanie Doane's children's music television series Ukulele U.

== Honour and recognition ==
Ezrin was inducted into the Canadian Music Hall of Fame in April 2004 and the Canadian Music Industry Hall of Fame in March 2006.

In 2011, Ezrin and Young Artist for Haiti won the Juno Award in Canada for "Single of the Year". Also in 2011, he was awarded an "Outstanding Contribution" at the Classic Rock Magazine Awards. In 2013, he was honoured with a star on Canada's Walk of Fame in Toronto.

Ezrin was also honoured in 2013 by The Royal Conservatory of Music, being named an honorary fellow of The Royal Conservatory.

In late 2022, he was named an Officer of the Order of Canada, "For his ongoing contributions to music and entertainment production, and for his sustained advocacy of musical education, journalism and environmental justice."

In February 2025, Ezrin was named as a recipient of the Governor General's Performing Arts Award.

== Personal life ==
Ezrin is married to Janet Ezrin.

He moved to Los Angeles, California in 1985 and became a naturalized citizen of the United States in the 1990s. In 2025, having moved back to Toronto from Nashville, Tennessee, he started the process to renounce his U.S. citizenship. In the context of tensions between Canada and the US, Ezrin told The Globe and Mail that he believed his Canadian honours represented not only recognition for prior work but also a responsibility to stand up for Canada going forward.

== Partial discography ==
- 2Cellos: In2ition (2013) – producer and mixer
- Thirty Seconds to Mars: 30 Seconds to Mars (2002) – producer
- Aerosmith: Get Your Wings (1974) – executive producer
- Alice Cooper
  - Love It to Death (1971) – producer, co-writer, and mixer
  - Killer (1971) – producer, co-writer, and mixer
  - School's Out (1972) – producer, co-writer, and mixer
  - Billion Dollar Babies (1973) – producer, co-writer, and mixer
  - Welcome to My Nightmare (1975) – producer, co-writer, and mixer
  - Alice Cooper Goes to Hell (1976) – producer, keyboardist, co-writer, and mixer
  - Lace and Whiskey (1977) – producer, co-writer, and mixer
  - The Alice Cooper Show (1977) – producer, co-writer, and mixer
  - DaDa (1983) – producer, co-writer, and mixer
  - Brutal Planet (2000) – executive producer
  - Dragontown (2001) – executive producer
  - Old School box set (2011) – project producer
  - Welcome 2 My Nightmare (2011) – producer, co-writer, and mixer
  - Paranormal (2017) – producer, composer, and mixer
  - Detroit Stories (2021) – producer, composer, and mixer
  - Road (2023) – producer, composer, and mixer
  - The Revenge of Alice Cooper (2025) – producer, composer, mixer and backing vocals
- Army of Anyone: Army of Anyone (2006) – producer and mixer
- The Babys: The Babys (1977) – co-producer with Brian Christian and mixer
- Balloonatic: My Underworld, Five Cent Beer (2003) – producer and mixer
- Berlin: "Count Three and Pray" (1986) – producer and mixer
- Robin Black: Instant Classic (2005) – co-producer with Gggarth and mixer
- Andrea Bocelli
  - Sì (2018) – producer and writer
- Bonham: The Disregard of Timekeeping (1989) – producer and mixer
- The Canadian Tenors
  - "Hallelujah" (2010), from the album The Perfect Gift – producer and mixer
  - "Forever Young" (2012), from the album Lead with Your Heart – producer and mixer
  - "World Stand Still" (2012), from the album Lead with Your Heart – vocal producer and mixer
- Catherine Wheel: Adam and Eve (1997) – co-producer with Gggarth
- Christian Kane: The House Rules (2010) – co-producer with Jimmie Lee Sloas and mixer
- Tim Curry: Read My Lips (1978) – producer and mixer
- The Darkness: Hot Cakes (2012) – mixer and co-producer on one song ("Every Inch of You")
- Deep Purple
  - Now What?! (2013) – producer, mixer and composer
  - Infinite (2017) – producer, mixer and composer
  - Whoosh! (2020) – producer, mixing, percussion, backing vocals and composer
  - Turning to Crime (2021) – producer, backing vocals, co-lead vocals
  - =1 (2024) – producer, mixing, backing vocals and composer
  - Splat! (2026) – producer
- Deftones: Saturday Night Wrist (2006) – producer
- Dr. John: Hollywood Be Thy Name (1975) – producer and mixer
- Escape from Earth: Three Seconds East (2004) – producer and mixer
- Fefe Dobson: Joy (2010) – producer and mixer
- Flo & Eddie: Flo & Eddie (1973) – producer and mixer
- Peter Gabriel
  - Peter Gabriel (I) (1977) – producer and mixer
  - "That'll Do" (1998) (title track from the film Babe: Pig in the City) – producer
  - "My Head Sounds Like That" (2002) (from the album Up) – brass arrangements
  - Scratch My Back (2010) – co-producer with Peter Gabriel
- David Gilmour: About Face (1984) – co-producer with David Gilmour
- Hanggai
  - Horse of Color (2016) – co-producer and mixer
  - Homeland (2017) – producer
- Hanoi Rocks: Two Steps from the Move (1984) – producer and mixer
- Héroes del Silencio: Avalancha (1995) – producer
- Hollywood Vampires: Hollywood Vampires (2015) – producer and mixer
- Steve Hunter: Swept Away (1978) – producer and mixer
- Hurricane: Over the Edge (1988) – co-producer with Mike Clink
- Jane's Addiction: Strays (2003) – co-producer with Brian Virtue
- The Jayhawks
  - Smile (2000) – producer
  - Sanctuary Park (2026) – producer, mixer, ukulele on Leap of Faith
- K'naan: Alone – single (2013) – co-writer, mixer, and co-producer with will.i.am (The Black Eyed Peas))
- Kansas: In the Spirit of Things (1988) – producer and mixer
- The Kings
  - The Kings Are Here (1980) – producer and mixer
  - Amazon Beach (1981) – producer and mixer
- Kiss
  - Destroyer (1976) – producer and mixer
  - Music from "The Elder" (1981) – producer and mixer
  - Revenge (1992) – producer
  - Destroyer: Resurrected (2012) – producer and mixer
- Kristin Chenoweth: Some Lessons Learned (2011) – producer, mixer, and co-writer
- Kula Shaker: Peasants, Pigs & Astronauts (1999) – producer
- Julian Lennon: Help Yourself (1991) – producer
- Lucius: Good Grief (2016) – co-producer with Shawn Everett and Lucius
- Murray McLauchlan: Storm Warning (1981) – producer and mixer
- Nils Lofgren: Nils (1979) – producer and mixer
- Nine Inch Nails: The Fragile (1999) – album sequencing ("I'd never examined what I was actually saying with these 20-something songs," Trent Reznor observed. "Then I realised it could be looked at as two acts. I see Ezrin as he's leaving my studio and I say, 'Bob, you did it, man!' and he says, 'Yeah, I know – I got a flight to catch.' We hugged each other and that was it."
- Geoffrey Oryema: Beat the Border (1993) – co-producer with Richard Blair and David Bottrill
- Orchestra di Piazza Vittorio: album (2007) – producer and mixer
- Phish:
  - Fuego (2014) – producer, mixer
  - Big Boat (2016) – producer, mixer
- Pink Floyd
  - The Wall (1979) – co-producer with David Gilmour and Roger Waters
  - A Momentary Lapse of Reason (1987) co-producer with David Gilmour
  - The Division Bell (1994) – co-producer with David Gilmour
  - The Endless River (2014) – bass guitar
- Trevor Rabin: Can't Look Away (1989) – producer
- Lou Reed: Berlin (1973) – producer and mixer
- Johnny Reid
  - A Christmas Gift To You (2013) – producer and mixer
  - A Christmas Gift To You Platinum Edition (2014) – producer and mixer
  - Revival (2017) – co-producer, composer and mixer
  - What Love Is All About (2015) – producer and mixer
- Rod Stewart: Every Beat of My Heart (1986) – producer
- Soundtrack
  - Babe: Pig in the City – Music from and Inspired by the Motion Picture (1998)
  - Heavy Metal 2000 (1999)
- Taylor Swift: Speak Now World Tour Live (2011) – mixer for both the CD and DVD
- Téléphone: Dure Limite (1982) – producer and mixer
- The Tenors: "Who Wants to Live Forever" from Under One Sky (2015) – producer, arranger and mixer
- The Tenors feat. Johnny Reid: "God Rest Ye Merry Gentlemen" (2017) – producer and mixer
- The Throbs: The Language of Thieves and Vagabonds (1991) – co-producer with Dick Wagner and Brian Christian
- U2: U2 at the BBC (2017) – producer
- U2 and Green Day: live recording of "The Saints Are Coming" (2006)
- Ursa Major: [Ursa Major] (1972) – producer and mixer
- Villebillies: "Greatest Moment" single (2006) – producer and mixer
- Vow Wow: Mountain Top (1990) – co-producer with Brian Christian, mixer, and co-writer
- Dick Wagner: Richard Wagner (1978) – producer and mixer
- Young Artists for Haiti: "Wavin' Flag" single (2010) – producer

== See also ==
- Album era
- Music of Canada
- Canadian Music Hall of Fame
