= Calico Cooper discography =

Discography of Calico Cooper

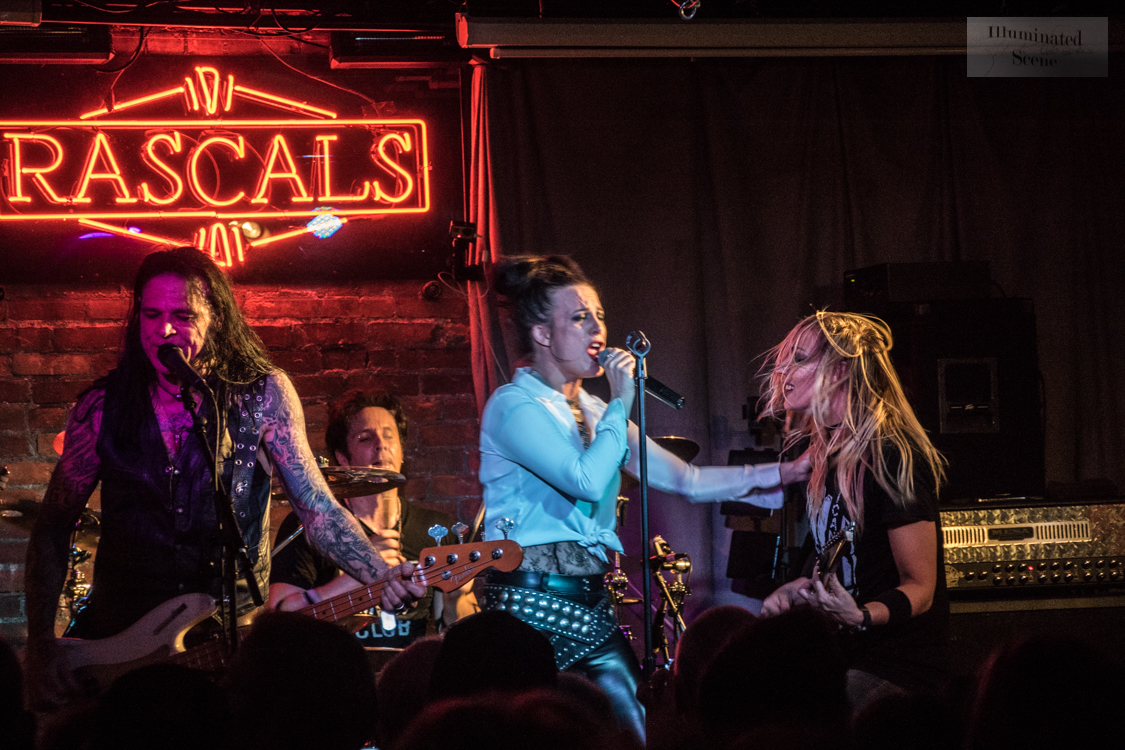
- Calico Cooper (center) singing with the Alice Cooper solo band in 2017
- Singles: 2
- Album contributions: 5
- Other songs: 5

The discography of Calico Cooper, a singer and stage performer for Alice Cooper and Beasto Blanco, consists of contributions to seven albums by Alice Cooper, including two video albums, and six contributions to singles and other songs as a featured artist. Her credits are listed below. Video albums and music videos featuring Cooper are listed in her filmography.

== Discography ==
=== Studio album contributions ===
Recording	Artist(s)	Year	Credit
Hey Stoopid	Alice Cooper	1992	Vocals
Dragontown	Alice Cooper	2001	Backing vocals
The Eyes of Alice Cooper	Alice Cooper	2003	Backing vocals, theremin
Along Came a Spider	Alice Cooper	2008	Spoken word, backing vocals
Detroit Stories	Alice Cooper	2021	Backing vocals

=== Singles as a featured artist ===
Recording	Year	Album
"Films" (Gary Numan cover) (Wednesday 13 featuring Calico Cooper)	2019	Non-album single
"Medusa (Unplugged)" (Seraina Telli featuring Calico Cooper)	2024	Black 'N' White Sessions
"No 1" (Die Antwoord cover) (Verona on Venus featuring Calico Cooper)	2025	Non-album single

=== Other songs ===
Song	Year	Artist(s)	Album
"The Last House on the Left"	2019	The 69 Eyes, Wednesday 13, Calico Cooper, and Dani Filth	West End
"Love Me Like a Reptile" (Motörhead tribute)	2022	Howling Giant, Calico Cooper, Chuck Garric, and Kyle Juett	Löve Me Förever: A Tribute to Motörhead
"Freewheelin'"	2024	Rock for Children, Alice Cooper; Calico Cooper, Slash	Solid Rock Revival
"Girls Come Together"	2024	Rock for Children, Calico Cooper, Alicia Chase	Solid Rock Revival
