= Calico Cooper filmography =

Filmography of Calico Cooper

- Film: 21
- Television film: 2
- Television series: 2
- Documentary: 2
- Music videos: 12
- Others: 2

Calico Cooper is a stage performer, actor, and singer. At age 16, she began performing in her father Alice Cooper's stage shows. Her career began at age 18 when Alice hired her to perform multiple roles in and provide choreography and design costumes for his Brutal Planet tour. Met with positive receptions, she stayed a regular in Alice's shows until 2011. She joined the band Beasto Blanco in 2012 as a stage performer and vocalist. In the 2000s, when not on tour with Alice Cooper, Calico acted in several independent films, mostly horror, including The Curse of El Charro, JunkfoodHorrorfest (2007), where she portrayed a "junkie serial killer", and Rolling (2007), where she portrayed a character using MDMA at a rave. A role in a deleted scene in the 2007 Halloween remake earned her Screen Actors Guild card. She played a lead role in The Visitor, which was in pre-production in 2008. Cooper portrayed Heather in Dakota Skye (2008), a barmaid in the horror film Suck (2009), and co-starred as the "Woman" character in Thirty Proof Coil (2010). Her first starring role in a film was in the 2010 horror film Thirty Proof Coil. She claims that she landed many horror movie roles due to her shows with Alice.

In 2011, she stepped down from regularly touring with Alice to better pursue her acting career. At the advice of local actors she enrolled in master classes taught by Ivana Chubbuck. After taking the course, at Chubbuck's recommendation, she auditioned, successfully, for the improv comedy groups The Groundlings and Upright Citizens Brigade Theatre. She also studied with the Stella Adler Studio of Acting, Margie Haber, and Gordon Hunt. In 2011, she landed a starring role in the TV series Bloomers (2011–2025) as the recurring character Lila Black and made an uncredited cameo in Hall Pass (2011). She portrayed Marcy in 13/13/13 (2013) and co-starred in Welcome to Hell (2018), which incorporated the short Family Time originally from 2013, portraying Susan, a murderous pedophile mother. She portrayed herself in The Curse of Denton Rose in 2020. Additional television roles include the murderer Jane Miller in a 2015 episode of Hawaii Five-0, and the character Tabitha in the 2016 episode "Danger & Thunder" in the children's comedy series Henry Danger. In 2016 she made an appearance on The Mindy Project. Cooper's directing and production work includes directing commercials and music videos and producing the crime-comedy film Love of Mass Destruction, which she co-starred in, the short film The Taxi Man, and the single-episode TV series The Normal Ones, a show she also wrote and co-starred in. In the 2024 short film Fire Fucking Fire, which debuted at Tribeca Festival in June, Cooper co-starred as the rock star love interest Meg opposite Ally (Rachel Paulson).

== Filmography ==
=== Film ===
Key
Denotes films produced by Calico Cooper

Year	Title	Role	Notes	Ref.
2005	The Curse of El Charro	The Mistress of Salvation		
2007	Puppy	Gum		
2007	JunkfoodHorrorfest	The Junkie		
2007	Rolling	Jess		
2007	Halloween	—N/a	Deleted scene	
2007	NRJ 12: Scream Awards	Herself, as Nurse Rozetta	Awards show	
2008	America’s Top Zombie	Herself	TV movie	
2008	Dakota Skye	Heather		
2009	Suck	Barmaid		
2010	Down to the Crossroads or How to Make a Movie 'Suck'	Herself	Documentary	
2010	Thirty Proof Coil	Woman		
2011	Denton Rose's Shorts	Herself	Direct-to-video	
2011	Hall Pass	Burger Babe	Uncredited	
2012	Lost Angeles	Sid		
2012	Honor Among Thieves	Tomi Chicago		
2013	13/13/13	Marcy		
2013	Family Time	Susan	Short film	
2014	Pretty Perfect	Candice		
2015	Love of Mass Destruction	Betty		
2016	The Crooked Man	Nancy Shanley	TV movie	
2017	The Choosing	Renee	Short film	
2018	Welcome to Hell	Susan	Incorporates the 2013 short Family Time	
2020	The Taxi Man	Jen	Short film	
2020	The Curse of Denton Rose	Herself	Documentary	
2024	Fire Fucking Fire	Meg	Short film. Cooper was an executive producer	

=== Television ===
Key
	Denotes television shows produced by Calico Cooper
•	Denotes television shows written by Calico Cooper

Year	Title	Role	Notes	Ref.
2003	E! True Hollywood Story	Herself	Season 8, episode 10 "Rock Star Daughters"	
2011	Bloomers	Lila Black	10 episodes, 2011–2025	
2013	Abstract Underwraps	Ms. Myers	Season 1, episode 2 "Abstract Underwraps"	
2014	Average Joe	Janet	Season 2, episode 4 "Day Trip to Milf Town"	
2014	My 2 Black Girlfriends	Friend on phone #1; Ronnie Bob	season 1, episode 7 "I Need a New Gay"; episode 8 "Oops! I Did it Again..."	
2015	Hawaii Five-0	Jane Miller	Season 5, episode 21 "Ua helele'i ka hoku (Fallen Star)"	
2016	Henry Danger	Tabitha	Season 2, episode 17 "Danger & Thunder"	
2018	The Normal Ones •	Kayla McQueen	Only one episode released: Pilot "Hashtag: Don't Call it a Comeback".	
2019	The Jimmy Star Show with Ron Russell	Herself	Season 14, episode 10 "Calico Cooper/Maria Olsen"	
2020	Infectious	Barbra	Television short	
2022	The Afterparty	2nd A.D.	Season 1, episode 7 "Danner"	
2023	The Source with Joshua Werner	Herself	Season 1, episode 3 "Beasto Blanco - Chuck Garric/Calico Cooper"	
2024	Interior Chinatown	Junior Partner	Season 1, episode 10 "Willis. Willis Wu"	

=== Video albums ===
Recording	Artist(s)	Year
Alice Cooper: Brutally Live	Alice Cooper	2000
Live at Montreux	Alice Cooper	2006

=== Music videos ===
Key
	Denotes music videos directed by Calico Cooper
•	Denotes music videos produced by Calico Cooper
†	Denotes music videos written by Calico Cooper

Year	Title	Performing artist	Role	Notes	Ref.
2012	"We Live Our Lives in Black"	Coyote	Herself	Directed by Chad Michael Ward	
2013	"Live Fast Die Loud"	Beasto Blanco	Herself, as Machine Girl	Directed by C. Conklyn; Assistant direction by Dorota Dabek	
2016	"Feed My Frankenstein"	Beasto Blanco	Herself, as Machine Girl	Directed by Jamie Brown; Photography direction by Sebastien Paquet	
2016	"Grind"	Beasto Blanco	Herself, as Machine Girl	Directed by Jamie Brown; Photography direction by Sebastien Paquet	
2016	"Death Rattle"	Beasto Blanco	Herself, as Machine Girl	Directed by Tod Junker	
2019	"Cold Cold Coffin"	Dennis Dunaway	Bride	Directed by Brian Cichocki	
2019	"The Seeker" • †	Beasto Blanco	Herself, as Machine Girl	Written, directed, and produced by Calico Cooper	
2019	"Solitary Rave" •	Beasto Blanco	Herself, as Machine Girl	Directed and produced by Calico Cooper	
2024	"Run for Your Life" †	Beasto Blanco	Herself, as Machine Girl	Directed and co-written by Calico Cooper	
2024	"Lowlands" †	Beasto Blanco	Herself, as Machine Girl	Co-written by Calico Cooper	
2024	"Diamond in the Dirt" †	Beasto Blanco	Herself, as Machine Girl	Co-written by Calico Cooper	
2024	"Unreal" (featuring Chris Harms) †	Beasto Blanco	Herself, as Machine Girl	Co-written by Calico Cooper	
