= List of Alice Cooper solo band members =

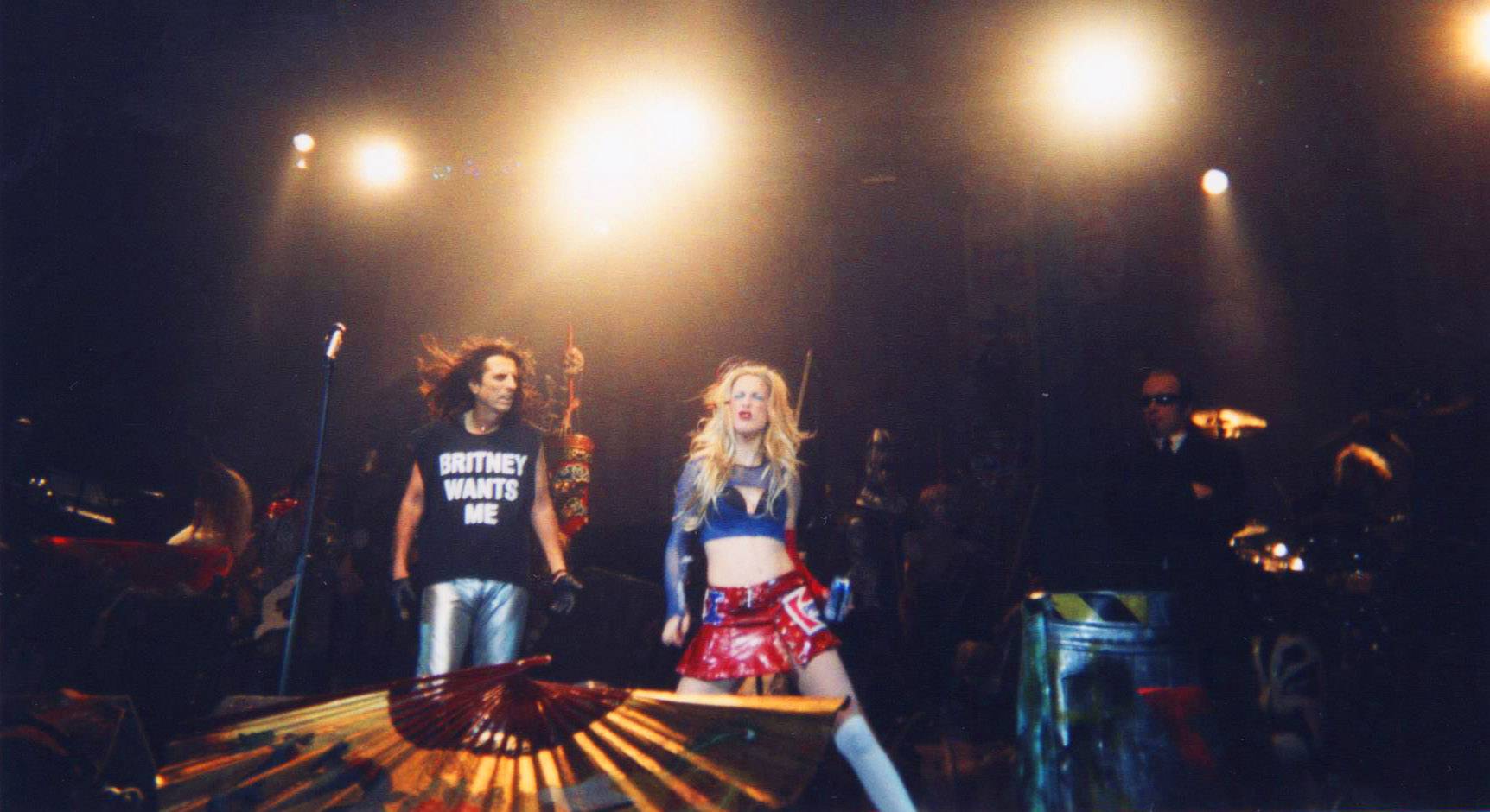
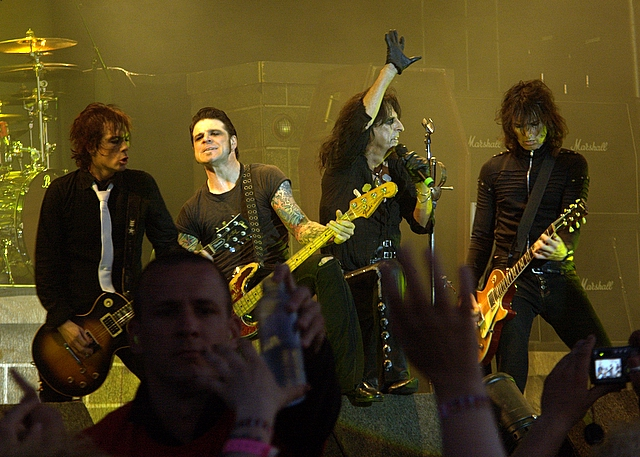
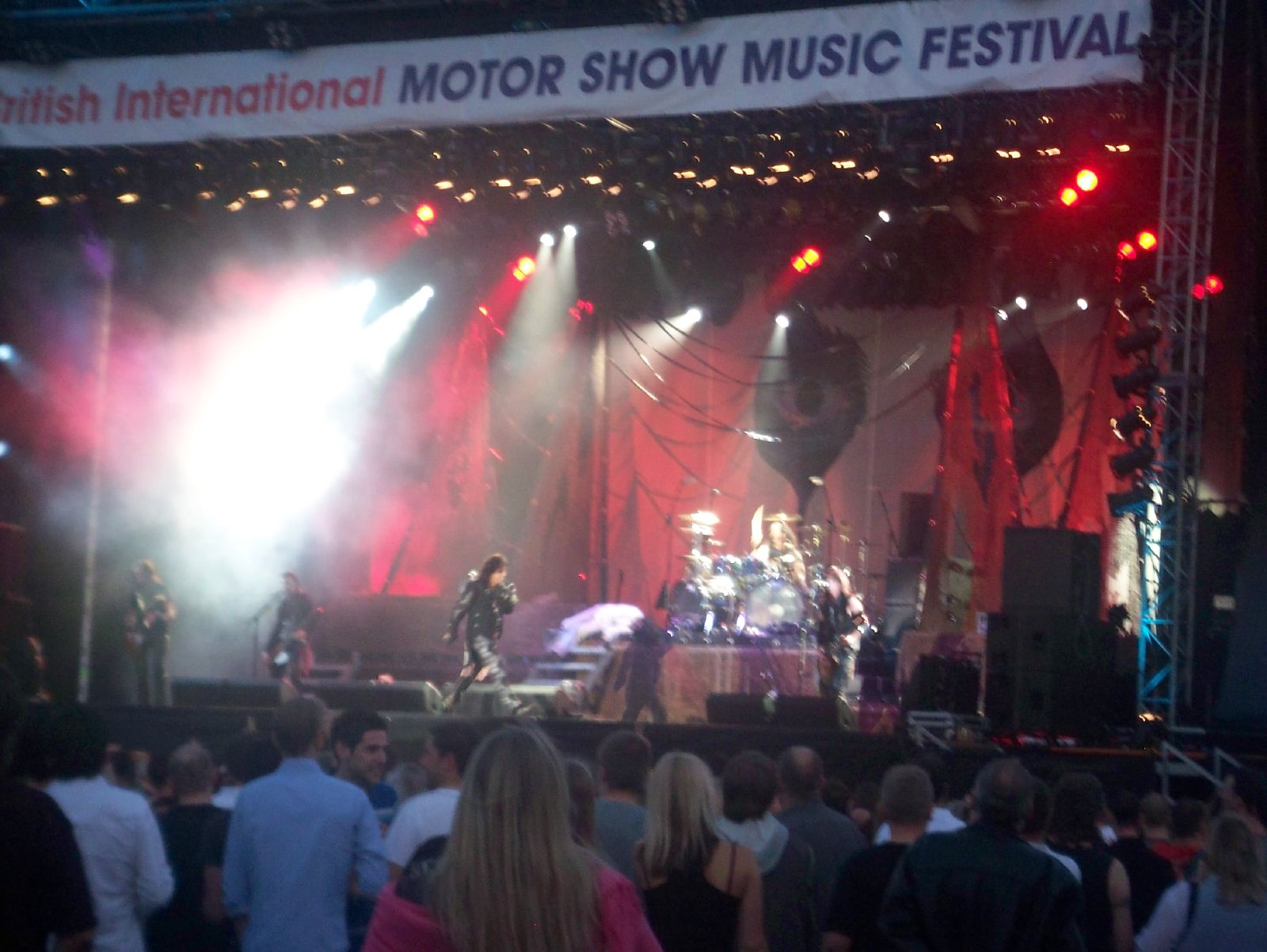
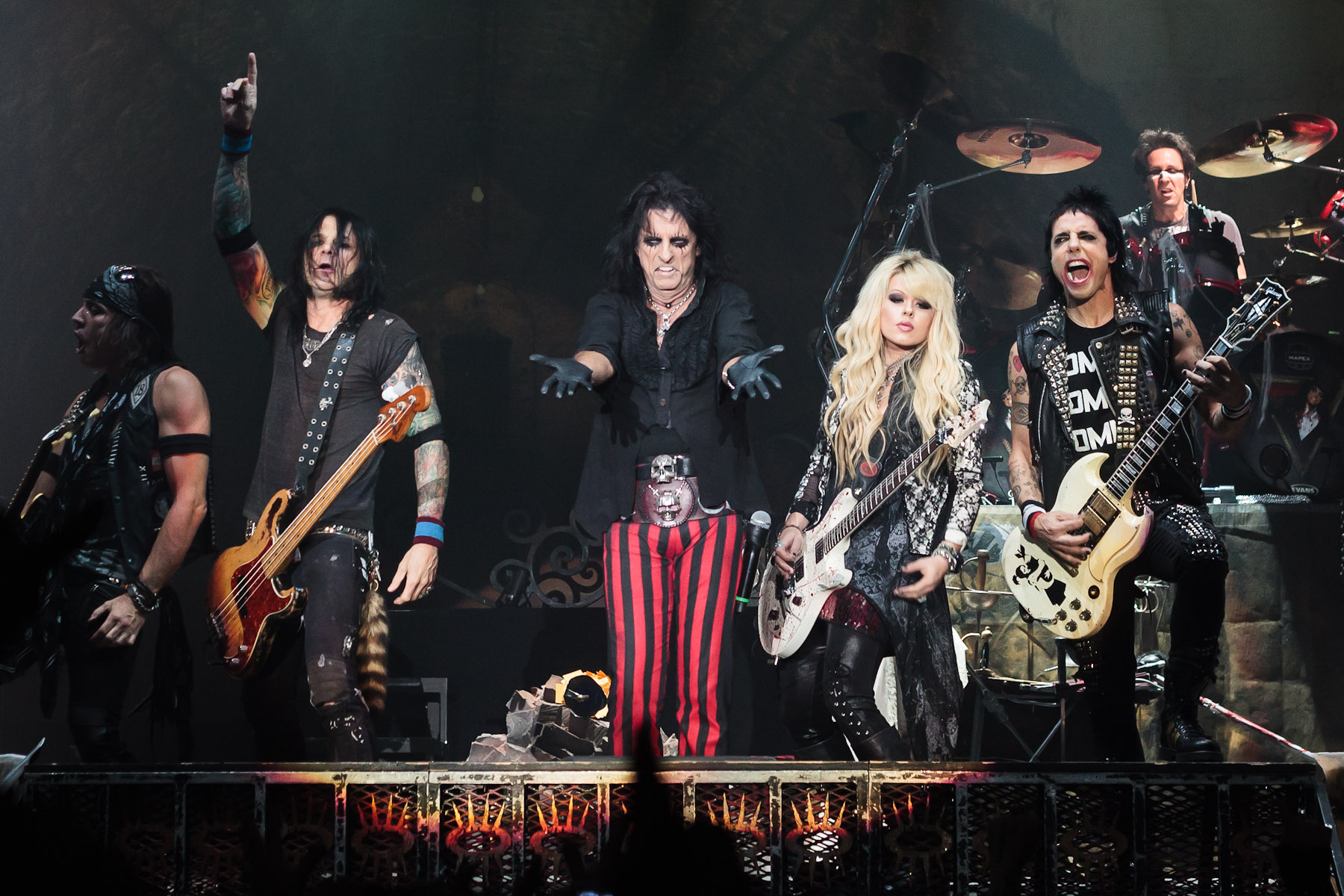
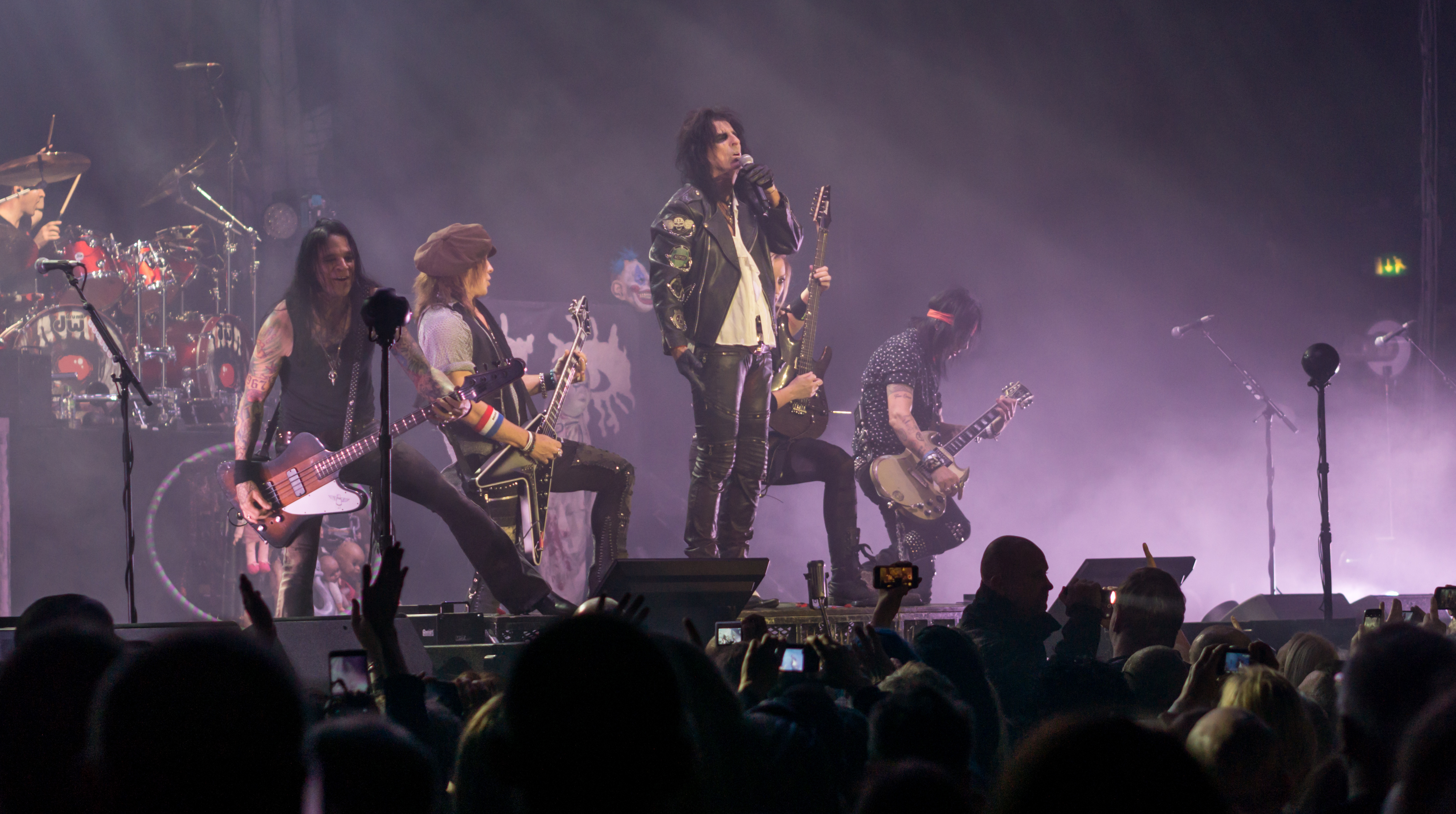
Five line-ups of Alice Cooper performing in 2002, 2006, 2008, 2012 and 2017

Alice Cooper is an American shock rock singer who started his career under his birth name, Vincent Furnier in the band Alice Cooper. Following the band’s breakup in 1974, Furnier legally took the name and started recording and touring with new musicians. His debut album, Welcome to My Nightmare, included guitarists Dick Wagner and Steve Hunter, bassist Prakash John, drummer Pentti "Whitey" Glan and keyboardists Bob Ezrin and Jozef Chirowski. These musicians, except Ezrin, contributed to his debut solo tour of the same name. His current tour band includes guitarist Ryan Roxie (who first joined in 1996), bassist Chuck Garric (since 2002), drummer Glen Sobel (since 2011) and guitarists Tommy Henriksen (since 2011) and Nita Strauss (who first joined in 2014).

== History ==
Cooper first started performing as a solo artist in 1975, when his debut solo album was released, and he embarked on his first solo tour. This tour included guitarists Dick Wagner and Steve Hunter, bassist Prakash John, drummer Pentti "Whitey" Glan and keyboardist Jozef Chirowski. The 'Welcome To My Nightmare Tour' started in March and ended in December. His second album, Alice Cooper Goes to Hell, was released in June 1976, it included guitarists Wagner, Hunter and John Tropea, keyboardist Ezrin, bassist Tony Levin, drummer Allan Schwartzberg and percussion Jimmy Maelen, he did not tour in support of this album. After legal troubles, the tour eventually got to Australia in March 1977 with the same band, except Chirowski and Hunter, the later of whom was replaced by Bob Kulick.

His next album, Lace and Whiskey, was released in April 1977, it included guitarists Wagner and Hunter, bassists Bob Babbitt, Prakash John and Tony Levin, percussionists Allan Schwartzberg, Jim Gordon and Jimmy Maelen, and keyboardists Al Kooper, Allan Macmillan, Josef Chirowski and Bob Ezrin. the supporting, 'King Of The Silver Screen', tour included guitarists Hunter, Wagner, bassist John, drummer Glan and keyboardist Fred Mandel. This tour produced the live album, The Alice Cooper Show.

In December 1978, From the Inside, which included, guitarists Dick Wagner, Davey Johnstone, Jay Graydon, and Rick Nielsen, bassists David Hungate, Dee Murray, and John Pierce, drummers Dennis Conway, Michael Ricciardella, and Rick Shlosser, and keyboardists David Foster, Fred Mandel, and Robbie King. Mandel, Glan, Prakash John, Johnstone and Hunter contributed to the supporting Madhouse Rock tour in 1979.

Flush the Fashion, was released in April 1980, it included Johnstone (lead guitar), Mandel (keyboards, guitar), Dennis Conway (drums) and bassist John Cooker Lopresti. The supporting tour ran from June to November 1980. Special Forces, included an entirely new band consisting of Duane Hitchings (keyboards), Danny Johnson and Mike Pinera (guitar), Craig Krampf (drums) and bassist Erik Scott. Pinera was replaced by John Raymond Nitzinger Jr for the supporting tour, which ran from June 1981 to February 1982.

Cooper did not tour again until 1986, in the meantime he released Zipper Catches Skin (1982), DaDa (1983) and Constrictor (1986). All three albums feature various members of Coopers previous tour bands. The Nightmare Returns tour featured lead guitarist Kane Roberts, rhythm guitarist Devlin 7, bassist Kip Winger, drummer Ken Mary and keyboardist Paul Horowitz (later known as Paul Taylor), this tour was recorded and released on a video of the same name. The same musicians, bar Devlin 7, played on Raise Your Fist and Yell (1987) and the supporting Live in the Flesh tour.

Trash (1989) featured guitarist John McCurry, bassist Hugh McDonald, drummer Bobby Chouinard and keyboardist Alan St. John. The supporting Trashes the World tour included a completely different band consisting of guitarists Al Pitrelli and Pete Friesen, keyboardist Derek Sherinian, bassist Tommy Caradonna and drummer Jonathan Mover. In July 1991, Hey Stoopid, was released, it included guitarist Stef Burns, bassist Hugh McDonald and drummer Mickey Curry, as well as other guests and session musicians. The supporting tour included guitarists Burns and Vinnie Moore, bassist Greg Smith, keyboardist Derek Sherinian, and drummer Eric Singer.

Cooper was inactive until 1994 when he released The Last Temptation, which featured his former tour band with David Uosikkinen replacing Singer as drummer. For his School's Out summer tour in 1996 and 1997, his band included guitarists Reb Beach and Ryan Roxie, former keyboardist Paul Taylor, bassist Todd Jensen and drummer Jimmy DeGrasso. The same band contributed to the Rock 'N' Roll Carnival tour from 1997 to 1999, though part way through Taylor was replaced by the returning Sherinian and then by Lindsay Vannoy. Roxie and Beach were replaced by the returning Pete Friesen and Stef Burns by the end of the tour.

In June 2000, Brutal Planet was released, which featured guitarists Ryan Roxie, Phil X and China, drummer Eric Singer and producer Bob Marlette on keyboards, bass and rhythm guitar. The supporting tour featured Roxie, Freisen, Smith, Singer and keyboardist Teddy 'Zig Zag' Andreadis for the first two legs, for the last legs Freisen was replaced by Eric Dover.

2001s Dragontown featured Roxie and Smith, as well as session musicians Tim Pierce and Wayne Swinny (guitars), Bob Marlette (guitar, bass, keyboards), Sid Riggs (keyboards, programming), drummer Kenny Aronoff, and backing vocalists Teddy Andreadis, Eric Dover, Calico Cooper and Gionvanna Morana. The supporting tour included Roxie, Dover (guitar), Andreadis (keys), Chuck Garric (bass), and Eric Singer (drums). The same musicians, except Andreadis, contributed to The Eyes of Alice Cooper (2003), they all contributed to the Bare Bones tour in 2003. As well as the 'Eyes' tour, where Singer was replaced by Tommy Clufetos. For the second leg Dover was replaced by Damon Johnson and Andreadis rejoined.

The final members of the Eyes tour, again except Andreadis, played on Dirty Diamonds (2005). As well as the supporting tour with Singer returning as drummer, though he was again replaced by Clufetos for dates in September due to his Singer's commitment to Kiss. Brent Fitz would later join as drummer in November 2006. For the Psycho-Drama tour 2007-2009, Keri Kelli joined the band as sole guitarist, with Singer and Garric staying in the band.

For 2008s Along Came a Spider, the band featured Garric and Singer, alongside guitarists/keyboardists Danny Saber and Greg Hampton. The Theatre of Death tour featured Garric and returning members Damon Johnson (guitar) and Jimmy DeGrasso (drums). Welcome 2 My Nightmare was released in 2011, featuring new guitarist Tommy Henriksen and many session musicians, including former members Dick Wagner, Steve Hunter and Kip Winger. The supporting No More Mr Nice Guy tour featured Garric, Johnson, Henriksen, Hunter and new drummer Glen Sobel. Part way through the tour Johnson was replaced by Orianthi.

Mover briefly returned in 2012 to temporarily replace Sobel who was having neck problems. For the Raise the Dead tour Hunter was replaced by the returning Ryan Roxie. Orianthi departed in 2014, she was replaced by Nita Strauss. The same tour band continued until July 2022 when Strauss left. Kane Roberts returned to take her place, although Strauss returned the following March, replacing Roberts. This lineup (excluding Cooper and occasionally Strauss) are often referred to as the Goon Squad who occasionally do shows in much smaller venues either before or after Alice Cooper’s shows. They play a wide variety of covers and have been joined by special guests such as Calico Cooper, Alice Cooper, Gilby Clarke, Gary Hoey and members of bands such as Psychedelic Furs, Wolfmother and Wheatus.

In November 2024 it was announced that former guitarist Orianthi would be returning to fill in for Strauss in January and February 2025. However in January the guitarist had to step down due to a torn hamstring and was replaced by Gilby Clarke (ex-Guns N' Roses) for those dates.

== Members ==
=== Current members ===
Image	Name	Years active	Instruments	Release contributions
	Alice Cooper (Vincent Furnier)	1974–present	vocals; harmonica; live guitar (1998-1999 only)	all releases
	Ryan Roxie (Ryan Rosowicz)	1996–1998; 2000–2006; 2012–present	guitar; backing vocals	A Fistful of Alice (1997); Brutal Planet (2000); Brutally Live (2000); Dragontown (2001); Dirty Diamonds (2005); Live at Cabo Wabo '96 (2005); Live at Montreux (2006); Raise the Dead: Live from Wacken (2014); Live From The Astroturf (2016); Road (2023)
	Chuck Garric	2002–present	bass; backing vocals	The Eyes Of Alice Cooper (2003); Dirty Diamonds (2005); Live At Montreux (2006); Along Came A Spider (2008); Theatre of Death: Live at Hammersmith 2009 (2010); Welcome 2 My Nightmare (2011); No More Mr. Nice Guy: Live (2012); Raise The Dead - Live From Wacken (2014); Road (2023)
	Tommy Henriksen	2011–present	guitar; backing vocals; studio keyboards and percussion	Welcome 2 My Nightmare (2011); No More Mr. Nice Guy: Live (2012); Raise the Dead - Live From Wacken (2014); Paranormal (2017); Detroit Stories (2021); Road (2023)
	Glen Sobel	2011–present	drums	No More Mr. Nice Guy: Live (2012); Raise the Dead: Live at Wacken (2013); A Paranormal Evening With Alice Cooper - At The Paris Olympia (2018); Road (2023)
	Nita Strauss	2014–2022; 2023–present	guitar; backing vocals	Paranormal (2017); A Paranormal Evening With Alice Cooper at the Olympia Paris (2018); Road (2023)
	Anna Cara	2026–present (substitute)	guitar; backing vocals	none to date

=== Former musicians ===
Image	Name	Years active	Instruments	Release contributions
	Dick Wagner	1974–1979; 1982–1983 (died 2014)	guitar; backing vocals; studio bass and keyboards	all releases from Welcome to My Nightmare (1975) to DaDa (1983), except Flush the Fashion (1980); Welcome 2 My Nightmare (2011)
	Prakash John	1974–1979	bass; backing vocals	Welcome to My Nightmare (1975); The Alice Cooper Show (1977); Lace and Whiskey (1977); DaDa (1983)
	Pentti "Whitey" Glan	1974–1979 (died 2017)	drums	Welcome to My Nightmare (1975); The Alice Cooper Show (1977)
	Steve Hunter	1974–1977; 1977; 2011–2012	guitar	all releases from Welcome to My Nightmare (1975) to The Alice Cooper Show (1977); Welcome 2 My Nightmare (2011); No More Mr. Nice Guy: Live (2012); Paranormal (2017); Detroit Stories (2021)
	Jozef Chirowski	1974–1977	keyboards; backing vocals	Welcome To My Nightmare (1975); Lace And Whiskey (1977)
	Bob Ezrin	1974–1976; 1983; 2017; 2021 (all session)	keyboards; backing vocals	Welcome to My Nightmare (1975); Alice Cooper Goes to Hell (1976); Lace and Whiskey (1977); DaDa (1983); Paranormal (2017); Detroit Stories (2021); Road (2023)
	Allan Schwartzberg	1976–1977 (session)	drums	Alice Cooper Goes to Hell (1976); Lace and Whiskey (1977)
	Jimmy Maelen	1976 (session) (died 1988)	percussion	Alice Cooper Goes to Hell (1976)
	John Tropea	1976 (session)	guitar	Alice Cooper Goes to Hell (1976)
	Tony Levin	1976 (session)	bass	Alice Cooper Goes to Hell (1976)
	Bob Babbitt	1977 (session) (died 2012)	bass	Lace and Whiskey (1977)
	Bob Kulick	1977 (touring substitute) (died 2020)	guitar	none
	Fred Mandel	1977–1980	keyboards; guitar; backing vocals	The Alice Cooper Show (1977); From the Inside (1978); Flush the Fashion (1980)
	Davey Johnstone	1978–1980	guitar; backing vocals	From the Inside (1978); Flush the Fashion (1980)
	Dennis Conway	1978–1980	drums	From the Inside (1978); Flush the Fashion (1980)
	Steve Lukather	1978; 1989 (both session)	guitar	From the Inside (1978); Trash (1989)
	Jay Graydon	1978 (session)	guitar	From the Inside (1978)
	Rick Nielsen	1978 (session)	guitar	From the Inside (1978)
	David Foster	1978 (session)	keyboards	From the Inside (1978)
	Robbie King	1978 (session) (died 2003)	keyboards	From the Inside (1978)
	Michael Ricciardella	1978 (session)	drums	From the Inside (1978)
	Rick Shlosser	1978 (session)	drums	From the Inside (1978)
	Jim Keltner	1978 (session)	percussion	From the Inside (1978)
	David Hungate	1978 (session)	bass	From the Inside (1978)
	Dee Murray	1978 (session) (died 1992)	bass	From the Inside (1978)
	John Pierce	1978 (session)	bass	From the Inside (1978)
	Lee Sklar	1978 (session)	bass	From the Inside (1978)
	John Cooker Lopresti	1979–1980	bass	Flush The Fashion (1980)
	Mark Volman (Flo)	1979–1980 (session) (died 2025)	backing vocals	Flush The Fashion (1980)
	Howard Kaylan (Eddie)	1979–1980 (session)	backing vocals	Flush The Fashion (1980)
	Joe Pizzulo	1979–1980 (session)	backing vocals	Flush The Fashion (1980)
	Keith Allison	1979–1980 (session)	backing vocals	Flush The Fashion (1980)
	Ricky "Rat" Tierney	1979–1980 (session)	backing vocals	Flush The Fashion (1980)
	Erik Scott	1981–1982 (died 2019)	bass	Special Forces (1981); Zipper Catches Skin (1982)
	Duane Hitchings	1981–1982	keyboards; synthesizer	Special Forces (1981); Zipper Catches Skin (1982)
	Craig Krampf	1981–1982 (died 2026)	drums; percussion	Special Forces (1981); Zipper Catches Skin (1982)
	Danny Johnson	1981–1982	guitar	Special Forces (1981)
	Mike Pinera	1981 (session) (died 2024)	guitar	Special Forces (1981)
	John Raymond Nitzinger Jr	1981–1982	guitar	Zipper Catches Skin (1982)
	Billy Steele	1982 (session)	guitar	Zipper Catches Skin (1982)
	Jan Uvena	1982 (session)	drums; percussion	Zipper Catches Skin (1982)
	Richard Kolinka	1983 (sessions)	drums	DaDa (1983)
	Graham Shaw	1983 (sessions)	Oberheim OB-X; Roland Jupiter; backing vocals	DaDa (1983)
	John Anderson	1983 (sessions)	drums	DaDa (1983)
	Karen Hendricks	1983 (sessions)	backing vocals	DaDa (1983)
	Lisa DalBello	1983 (sessions)	backing vocals	DaDa (1983)
	Kane Roberts (Robert William Athas)	1985–1988; 2022–2023	guitar; backing vocals; keyboards	Constrictor (1986); Raise Your Fist and Yell (1987); Trash (1989); Road (2023)
	Kip Winger (Charles Frederick Winger)	1985–1988	bass; backing vocals; keyboards	Constrictor (1986); Raise Your Fist and Yell (1987); Trash (1989); Welcome 2 My Nightmare (2011)
	David Rosenberg	1985–1986 (session)	drums	Constrictor (1986)
	Donnie Kisselbach	1985–1986 (session)	bass	Constrictor (1986)
	Paul Delph	1985–1986 (session) (died 1996)	keyboards; backing vocals	Constrictor (1986)
	Tom Kelly	1985–1986 (session)	backing vocals	Constrictor (1986)
	Beau Hill	1985–1986 (session)	backing vocals	Constrictor (1986)
	Paul Taylor (also known as Paul Horowitz)	1986–1988; 1996–1998	keyboards; guitar; backing vocals	Raise Your Fist and Yell (1987); The Nightmare Returns (1987); A Fistful of Alice (1997)
	Ken Mary	1986–1988	drums	The Nightmare Returns (1987); Raise Your Fist and Yell (1987)
	Devlin 7	1986–1987 (touring)	guitar	The Nightmare Returns (1987)
	Hugh McDonald	1988–1990 (session)	bass	Trash (1989); Hey Stoopid (1991)
	John McCurry	1988–1989 (session)	guitar	Trash (1989)
	Bobby Chouinard	1988–1989 (session)	drums	Trash (1989)
	Alan St. John	1988–1989 (session)	keyboards	Trash (1989)
	Derek Sherinian	1989–1991; 1998	keyboards; backing vocals	Trashes The World (1990); The Last Temptation (1994)
	Pete Friesen	1989–1990; 1998–2000 (both touring)	guitar; backing vocals	Trashes The World (1990)
	Al Pitrelli	1989–1990 (touring)	guitar; backing vocals	Trashes The World (1990)
	Tommy Caradonna	1989–1990 (touring)	bass; backing vocals	Trashes The World (1990)
	Jonathan Mover	1989–1990 (touring); 2012 (substitute)	drums; backing vocals	Trashes The World (1990)
	Stef Burns	1990–1994; 1998–1999	guitar; backing vocals	Hey Stoopid (1991); The Last Temptation (1994)
	Mickey Curry	1990–1991 (session)	drums	Hey Stoopid (1991)
	Lance Bulen	1990–1991 (session)	backing vocals	Hey Stoopid (1991)
	Vinnie Moore	1991	guitar	Hey Stoopid (1991)
	Greg Smith	1991–1994; 2000–2001	bass; backing vocals	The Last Temptation (1994); Brutally Live (2000)
	Eric Singer (Eric Mensinger)	1991; 2000–2003; 2005–2006	drums; backing vocals	Brutal Planet (2000); Brutally Live (2000); The Eyes of Alice Cooper (2003); Live at Montreux (2006); Along Came a Spider (2008)
	David Uosikkinen	1993–1994 (session)	drums	The Last Temptation (1994)
	Jimmy DeGrasso	1996–1999; 2009–2010	drums	A Fistful of Alice (1997); Theatre of Death: Live at Hammersmith 2009 (2010); Welcome 2 My Nightmare (2011)
	Todd Jensen	1996–1999 (touring)	bass; backing vocals	A Fistful of Alice (1997)
	Reb Beach	1996–1998 (touring)	guitar; backing vocals	A Fistful of Alice (1997)
	Lindsay Vannoy	1998–1999 (touring)	keyboards	none
	Bob Marlette	2000; 2001 (both session)	rhythm guitar; bass; keyboards; programming	Brutal Planet (2000); Dragontown (2001)
	Sid Riggs	2000; 2001 (both session)	keyboards; programming	Brutal Planet (2000); Dragontown (2001)
	Phil X (Theofilos Xenidis)	2000 (session)	guitar	Brutal Planet (2000)
	China	2000 (session)	guitar	Brutal Planet (2000)
	Teddy 'Zig Zag' Andreadis	2000; 2001–2002; 2004	keyboards; backing vocals	Brutally Live (2000); Dragontown (2001); The Eyes Of Alice Cooper (2003); Dirty Diamonds (2005)
	Eric Dover	2001–2003	guitar; backing vocals	Dragontown (2001); The Eyes of Alice Cooper (2003)
	Calico Cooper	2001–2003	backing vocals	Dragontown (2001); The Eyes of Alice Cooper (2003)
	Gionvanna Morana	2001 (session)	backing vocals	Dragontown (2001)
	Tim Pierce	2001 (session)	guitar	Dragontown (2001)
	Wayne Swinny	2001 (session)	guitar	Dragontown (2001)
	Kenny Aronoff	2001 (session)	drums	Dragontown (2001)
	Tommy Clufetos	2003; 2005 (substitute)	drums	Dirty Diamonds (2005)
	Damon Johnson	2004–2005; 2009–2010	guitar; keyboards; backing vocals; studio bass (2005 only)	Dirty Diamonds (2005); Live at Montreux (2006); Theatre of Death: Live at Hammersmith 2009 (2010)
	Keri Kelli (Kenneth Fear Jr.)	2006–2009	guitar; backing vocals	Along Came a Spider (2008); Theatre of Death: Live at Hammersmith 2009 (2010); Welcome 2 My Nightmare (2011)
	Brent Fitz	2006 (substitute)	drums; backing vocals	none
	Danny Saber	2007–2008 (session)	guitar; bass; keyboards; backing vocals	Along Came a Spider (2008)
	Greg Hampton	2007–2008 (session)	guitar; bass; keyboards; backing vocals	Along Came a Spider (2008)
	Pat Buchanan	2011 (session)	guitar	Welcome 2 My Nightmare (2011)
	Vicki Hampton	2011 (session)	backing vocals	Welcome 2 My Nightmare (2011)
	Wendy Moten	2011 (session)	backing vocals	Welcome 2 My Nightmare (2011)
	Scott Williamson	2011 (session)	drums	Welcome 2 My Nightmare (2011)
	Jimmie Lee Sloas	2011 (session)	bass	Welcome 2 My Nightmare (2011)
	Orianthi (Orianthi Panagaris)	2011–2014 (touring)	guitar; backing vocals	No More Mr. Nice Guy: Live (2012); Raise the Dead: Live from Wacken (2014)
	Gilby Clarke	2025 (substitute)	guitar; backing vocals	none

== Line-ups ==
Period	Members	Releases
Spring 1974 – December 1975 (sessions and tour)	Alice Cooper – vocals; Dick Wagner – guitar, backing vocals; Steve Hunter – guitar; Prakash John – bass, backing vocals; Jozef Chirowski – keyboards, backing vocals; Bob Ezrin – keyboards, backing vocals (session only); Whitey Glan – drums	Welcome to My Nightmare (1975)
1976 (sessions)	Alice Cooper – vocals; Dick Wagner – guitar, backing vocals; Steve Hunter – guitar; John Tropea - guitar; Bob Ezrin – piano, Fender Rhodes, synthesizer, vocals; Tony Levin – bass; Allan Schwartzberg – drums; Jimmy Maelen - percussion	Alice Cooper Goes to Hell (1976)
1977 (sessions)	Alice Cooper — vocals; Dick Wagner — guitar, backing vocals; Steve Hunter — guitar; Allan Schwartzberg — drums; Bob Babbitt — bass; Jozef Chirowski – keyboards; Bob Ezrin – keyboards, backing vocals	Lace and Whiskey (1977)
March – April 1977 (tour)	Alice Cooper – vocals; Dick Wagner – guitar, backing vocals; Prakash John – bass, backing vocals; Whitey Glan – drums; Bob Kulick – guitar	none
June – August 1977 (tour)	Alice Cooper – vocals; Steve Hunter - guitar; Dick Wagner - guitar, backing vocals; Prakash John - bass, backing vocals; Whitey Glan - drums; Fred Mandel - keyboards	The Alice Cooper Show (1977)
1978 (sessions)	Alice Cooper; Dick Wagner – lead guitar; Davey Johnstone – lead guitar, backing vocals; Jay Graydon, Steve Lukather, Rick Nielsen – guitar; David Hungate, Dee Murray, John Pierce, Lee Sklar – bass; David Foster, Fred Mandel, Robbie King – keyboards; Dennis Conway, Michael Ricciardella, Rick Shlosser – drums; Jim Keltner – percussion	From the Inside (1978)
1978 – April 1979 (tour)	Alice Cooper – vocals; Steve Hunter – guitar; Prakash John – bass, backing vocals; Whitey Glan – drums; Fred Mandel – keyboards; Davey Johnstone – guitar, backing vocals	none
1979 – November 1980 (sessions and tour)	Alice Cooper – vocals; Davey Johnstone – lead guitar, backing vocals; Fred Mandel – keyboards, guitar, backing vocals; Dennis Conway – drums; John Cooker Lopresti – bass guitar; Flo & Eddie – backing vocals; Joe Pizzulo – backing vocals; Keith Allison – backing vocals; Ricky "Rat" Tierney – backing vocals	Flush the Fashion (1980)
1981 (sessions)	Alice Cooper – vocals; Duane Hitchings – keyboards; Danny Johnson – guitar; Mike Pinera – guitar; Craig Krampf – drums; Erik Scott – bass guitar	Special Forces (1981)
June 1981 – February 1982 (tour)	Alice Cooper – vocals; Duane Hitchings – keyboards; Danny Johnson – guitar; Craig Krampf – drums; Erik Scott – bass guitar; John Raymond Nitzinger Jr – guitar	none
Mid 1982 (sessions)	Alice Cooper – vocals, synthesizer; Dick Wagner – guitar; Mike Pinera – guitar; Erik Scott – bass; Jan Uvena – drums, percussion; John Nitzinger – guitar; Billy Steele – guitar; Duane Hitchings – synthesizer; Craig Krampf – percussion	Zipper Catches Skin (1982)
1983 (sessions)	Alice Cooper – vocals; Dick Wagner – guitar; bass; backing vocals; Prakash John – bass; Richard Kolinka – drums; Graham Shaw – Oberheim OB-X; Roland Jupiter; backing vocals; Bob Ezrin – Fairlight CMI programming; keyboards; drums; percussion; John Anderson – drums; Karen Hendricks – backing vocals; Lisa DalBello – backing vocals	DaDa (1983)
1985 – 1986 (sessions)	Alice Cooper – vocals; Kane Roberts – guitars, bass, keyboards, drums, backing vocals; Kip Winger – bass, backing vocals; David Rosenberg – drums; Donnie Kisselbach – bass; Paul Delph – keyboards, backing vocals; Tom Kelly – backing vocals; Beau Hill – backing vocals	Constrictor (1986)
October 1986 – August 1987 (tour and sessions)	Alice Cooper - vocals; Kane Roberts - lead guitar, backing vocals; Devlin 7 - rhythm guitar (touring only); Kip Winger - bass, backing vocals, keyboards; Ken Mary - drums; Paul Horowitz Taylor - keyboards, backing vocals	The Nightmare Returns (1987/2006); Raise Your Fist and Yell (1987)
October 1987 – May 1988 (tour)	Alice Cooper - vocals; Kane Roberts - guitar, backing vocals; Kip Winger - bass, backing vocals; Ken Mary - drums; Paul Horowitz Taylor - keyboards, guitar, backing vocals	none
1988 – 1989 (sessions)	Alice Cooper – vocals; John McCurry – guitar; Hugh McDonald – bass; Bobby Chouinard – drums; Alan St. John – keyboards	Trash (1989)
October 1989 – October 1990 (tour)	Alice Cooper – vocals; Al Pitrelli – guitar, backing vocals; Pete Friesen – guitar, backing vocals; Derek Sherinian – keyboards; Tommy Caradonna – bass; Jonathan Mover – drums; Devon Meade – backing vocals	Trashes the World (1990/2004)
1990–1991 (sessions)	Alice Cooper – vocals, harmonica; Stef Burns – guitars; Hugh McDonald – bass; Lance Bulen – backing vocals; Mickey Curry – drums	Hey Stoopid (1991)
July – November 1991 (tour)	Alice Cooper – vocals; Vinnie Moore - guitars; Stef Burns – guitars, backing vocals; Derek Sherinian – keyboards; Greg Smith – bass; Eric Singer – drums	none
1993 – 1994 (sessions)	Alice Cooper – vocals; Stef Burns – guitars, backing vocals; Greg Smith – bass, backing vocals; Derek Sherinian – keyboards, backing vocals; David Uosikkinen – drums	The Last Temptation (1994)
November 1995 – December 1997 (tour)	Alice Cooper – vocals; Reb Beach – guitar, backing vocals; Ryan Roxie – guitar, backing vocals; Paul Taylor – keyboards, backing vocals; Todd Jensen – bass, backing vocals; Jimmy DeGrasso – drums	A Fistful of Alice (1997)
May – June 1998 (tour)	Alice Cooper – vocals, harmonica, guitar; Reb Beach – guitar, backing vocals; Paul Taylor – keyboards, guitar, backing vocals; Todd Jensen – bass, backing vocals; Jimmy DeGrasso – drums; Pete Friesen – guitar, backing vocals	none
June – December 1998 (tour)	Alice Cooper – vocals, harmonica, guitar; Reb Beach – guitar, backing vocals; Todd Jensen – bass, backing vocals; Pete Friesen – guitar, backing vocals; Derek Sherinian – keyboards; Eric Singer – drums	none
December 1998 (tour)	Alice Cooper – vocals, harmonica, guitar; Todd Jensen – bass, backing vocals; Pete Friesen – guitar, backing vocals; Eric Singer – drums; Stef Burns – guitar, backing vocals; Lindsay Vannoy – keyboards	none
September – December 1999 (tour)	Alice Cooper – vocals, harmonica, guitar; Eric Singer – drums; Lindsay Vannoy – keyboards; Pete Friesen – guitar, backing vocals; Ryan Roxie – guitar, backing vocals; Greg Smith – bass, backing vocals	none
Early 2000 (sessions)	Alice Cooper – vocals; Eric Singer – drums; Ryan Roxie – guitars; Phil X – guitars; China - guitars; Bob Marlette – rhythm guitar, bass, keyboards	Brutal Planet (2000)
February – November 2000 (tour)	Alice Cooper – vocals; Eric Singer – drums; Pete Friesen – guitar, backing vocals; Ryan Roxie – guitar, backing vocals; Greg Smith – bass, backing vocals; Teddy "Zig Zag" Abdreadis – keyboards, backing vocals	none
April – May 2001 (tour)	Alice Cooper – vocals; Eric Singer – drums; Ryan Roxie – guitar, backing vocals; Greg Smith – bass, backing vocals; Teddy "Zig Zag" Abdreadis – keyboards, backing vocals; Eric Dover – guitar, backing vocals	none
2001 (sessions)	Alice Cooper – vocals; Ryan Roxie – guitar; Greg Smith – bass; with: Tim Pierce – guitar; Wayne Swinny – guitar; Bob Marlette – rhythm guitar, bass, keyboards, programming; Sid Riggs – keyboards, programming; Teddy Andreadis – backing vocals; Eric Dover – backing vocals; Calico Cooper – backing vocals; Gionvanna Morana – backing vocals; Kenny Aronoff – drums	Dragontown (2001)
September 2001 – December 2002 (tour)	Alice Cooper – vocals; Ryan Roxie – guitar, backing vocals; Eric Dover – guitar, backing vocals; Teddy Andreadis – keyboards, backing vocals; Chuck Garric – bass, backing vocals; Eric Singer – drums	none
January – August 2003 (sessions and tour)	Alice Cooper - vocals; Eric Dover - guitar, backing vocals; Ryan Roxie - guitar, vocals; Chuck Garric - bass, backing vocals; Eric Singer - drums	The Eyes of Alice Cooper (2003)
September – November 2003 (tour)	Alice Cooper - vocals; Eric Dover - guitar, backing vocals; Ryan Roxie - guitar, vocals; Chuck Garric - bass, backing vocals; Tommy Clufetos – drums	none
June – October 2004 (tour)	Alice Cooper - vocals; Ryan Roxie - guitar, backing vocals; Chuck Garric - bass, backing vocals; Tommy Clufetos – drums; Damon Johnson – guitar, backing vocals; Teddy Andreadis – keyboards, backing vocals	none
2004 – 2005 (sessions)	Alice Cooper – vocals, harmonica; Ryan Roxie – guitar, backing vocals; Damon Johnson – guitar, backing vocals, bass; Chuck Garric – bass, backing vocals; Tommy Clufetos – drums	Dirty Diamonds (2005)
June 2005 – February 2006 (tour)	Alice Cooper – vocals, harmonica; Ryan Roxie – guitar, backing vocals; Damon Johnson – guitar, keyboards, backing vocals; Chuck Garric – bass, backing vocals; Eric Singer – drums, backing vocals	Live at Montreux (2006)
May – November 2006 (tour)	Alice Cooper – vocals, harmonica; Damon Johnson – guitar, backing vocals; Chuck Garric – bass, backing vocals; Eric Singer – drums, backing vocals; Keri Kelli – guitar, backing vocals	none
November – December 2006 (tour)	Alice Cooper – vocals, harmonica; Damon Johnson – guitar, backing vocals; Chuck Garric – bass, backing vocals; Keri Kelli – guitar, backing vocals; Brent Fitz – drums, backing vocals	none
June 2007 – July 2009 (tour)	Alice Cooper – vocals, harmonica; Chuck Garric – bass, backing vocals; Eric Singer – drums, backing vocals; Keri Kelli – guitar, backing vocals	none
2007 – 2008 (sessions)	Alice Cooper – vocals; Danny Saber – guitar, bass, keyboards, backing vocals; Greg Hampton – guitars, keyboards, backing vocals; Chuck Garric – bass, backing vocals; Eric Singer – drums	Along Came a Spider (2008)
July 2009 – November 2010 (tour)	Alice Cooper – vocals, harmonica; Chuck Garric – bass, backing vocals; Damon Johnson – guitar, backing vocals; Jimmy DeGrasso – drums	none
2011 (sessions)	Alice Cooper – vocals, harmonica; Tommy Henriksen - lead guitar; with many session musicians	Welcome 2 My Nightmare (2011)
March – August 2011	Alice Cooper – vocals, harmonica; Tommy Henriksen – guitar, backing vocals; Chuck Garric – bass, backing vocals; Steve Hunter – guitar, backing vocals; Damon Johnson – guitar, backing vocals; Glen Sobel – drums	none
September 2011 – August 2012	Alice Cooper – vocals, harmonica; Tommy Henriksen – guitar, backing vocals; Chuck Garric – bass, backing vocals; Steve Hunter – guitar, backing vocals; Glen Sobel – drums; Orianthi – guitar, backing vocals	No More Mr. Nice Guy: Live (2012)
October 2012 – June 2014	Alice Cooper – vocals, harmonica; Tommy Henriksen – guitar, backing vocals; Chuck Garric – bass, backing vocals; Glen Sobel – drums; Orianthi – guitar, backing vocals; Ryan Roxie – guitar, backing vocals	Raise The Dead: Live from Wacken (2014)
June 2014 – July 2022	Alice Cooper – vocals, harmonica; Tommy Henriksen – guitar, backing vocals; Chuck Garric – bass, backing vocals; Glen Sobel – drums; Ryan Roxie – guitar, backing vocals; Nita Strauss – guitar, backing vocals	Paranormal (2017) live tracks; Henriksen only on studio tracks; Detroit Stories (2021) Henriksen only
July 2022 – March 2023	Alice Cooper – vocals, harmonica; Tommy Henriksen – guitar, backing vocals; Chuck Garric – bass, backing vocals; Glen Sobel – drums; Ryan Roxie – guitar, backing vocals; Kane Roberts – guitar, backing vocals	Road (2023) one track
March 2023 – late 2024	Alice Cooper – vocals, harmonica; Tommy Henriksen – guitar, backing vocals; Chuck Garric – bass, backing vocals; Glen Sobel – drums; Ryan Roxie – guitar, backing vocals; Nita Strauss – guitar, backing vocals	Road (2023) remaining tracks
February – March 2025	Alice Cooper – vocals, harmonica; Tommy Henriksen – guitar, backing vocals; Chuck Garric – bass, backing vocals; Glen Sobel – drums; Ryan Roxie – guitar, backing vocals; Gilby Clarke – guitar, backing vocals	none
March 2025 – present	Alice Cooper – vocals, harmonica; Tommy Henriksen – guitar, backing vocals; Chuck Garric – bass, backing vocals; Glen Sobel – drums; Ryan Roxie – guitar, backing vocals; Nita Strauss – guitar, backing vocals	none to date
