= Gimme (Alice Cooper song) =

2000 single by Alice Cooper

- Single Cover

Single by Alice Cooper

from the album Brutal Planet
- B-side: "Brutal Planet"
- Released: August 2000
- Recorded: 2000
- Length: 4:46 (album version) 3:51 (radio edit)
- Label: Spitfire Records
- Songwriters: Alice Cooper, Bob Marlette
- Producer: Bob Marlette

Alice Cooper singles chronology
"School's Out (Live)" (1997)	"Gimme" (2000)	"Keepin' Halloween Alive" (2009)

"Gimme" is a single by rock singer Alice Cooper, released in 2000.

The song appeared on Cooper's album Brutal Planet, and was its first and only single. Its highest chart position was 85 in the UK. The song was written by Cooper and Bob Marlette.

The song is about a deal with the Devil, sung from the point of view of Satan. This is a recurring theme for Cooper, and a motif he uses in songs like "I'm The Coolest" from 1976's Alice Cooper Goes to Hell and "I Just Wanna Be God" on Dragontown, the follow-up album to Brutal Planet. The lyrics also make a reference to "Nothing's Free" from The Last Temptation, another song with the same theme.

== Music video ==
A music video was produced to promote the single.

== Album appearances ==
- Brutal Planet
- Alice Cooper: Brutally Live
- Dragontown bonus disc
- Frezno Smooth Original Soundtrack
- Live at Montreux 2005

== Personnel ==
- Alice Cooper – vocals
- Ryan Roxie – guitar
- Phil X. – guitar
- China – guitar
- Eric Singer – drums
- Bob Marlette – rhythm guitar, bass, keyboards

== Charts ==
Chart (2000)	Peak position
UK Singles Chart	85
