= Jim Bolger (disambiguation) =

Jim Bolger (1935–2025) was the Prime Minister of New Zealand from 1990 to 1997.

James or Jim Bolger may also refer to:

- Jim Bolger (baseball) (1932–2020), American Major League Baseball player
- Jim Bolger (racehorse trainer) (born 1941), Irish horse trainer
- James Bolger, character in 11/11/11

== See also ==
- James Bulger (disambiguation)
