= Bram Stoker's Dracula's Guest =

- Film poster
- Directed by: Michael Feifer
- Written by: Michael Feifer
- Based on: "Dracula's Guest" by Bram Stoker
- Starring: Amy Lyndon; Wes Ramsey; Andrew Bryniarski
- Cinematography: Charles Haine
- Edited by: Leaf Baimbridge
- Music by: Andres Boulton
- Production companies: North American Entertainment, Barnholtz Entertainment
- Release date: August 2008
- Running time: 82 minutes
- Country: United States
- Language: English

Bram Stoker's Dracula's Guest (also known as just Dracula's Guest) is a 2008 film that was written and directed by Michael Feifer. It was released direct to video in August 2008 and is loosely based on Bram Stoker's short story "Dracula's Guest".

== Plot ==
The story opens showing a young man finding a young woman he knows behind bars, having been imprisoned and raped. He swears to get her out and the scene cuts to six months earlier. The young man is Bram Stoker and he has a relationship with Admiral Murray's daughter, Elizabeth in Victorian England. He works in a real estate company and has just given his career a boost by finding a home for the firm's new client, Count Dracula. The Admiral is not impressed with Bram and insists he and Elizabeth observe a year's separation to test their love before he'll give his blessing to their marriage. Bram accepts and leaves to begin his year but Elizabeth is rebellious and runs off, presumably to find Bram in Scotland. She gets waylaid by the Count at the train station where he abducts her to his home in Transylvania. Bram's friend Malcolm rushes to find Bram and tell him about the abduction but is caught and killed by Dracula at Stoker's apartment. He had told his business to Mrs. Withen the landlady, before he died so Bram was able to get the information he needed and rushed off to her rescue. He is accosted twice on the road to the Slovak region, once in France and the second time in Germany on Walpurgisnacht. Meanwhile, the Admiral is also on his way to rescue his daughter. We come again to the scene where Bram finds Elizabeth imprisoned in her underground chamber and he then begins a death-defying climb up the side of the mountain to where he can enter the castle. He challenges the Count to a fight in which he is clearly outmatched and when the Count abandons him the Admiral catches up to Bram in the mausoleum. He sends the young man on to find his daughter, while he searches for Dracula. The two older men meet up in front of the dungeon grating shortly after Bram finds Elizabeth and fight. The Admiral wins in spite of taunting by the Count and the scene fades out.

== Cast ==
- Amy Lyndon as Mrs. Witham
- Wes Ramsey as Bram Stoker
- Andrew Bryniarski as Count Dracula
- Kelsey McCann as Elizabeth Murray
- Dan Speaker as Admiral Murray
- Ryan Christiansen as Malcolm
- Caia Coley as Mrs. Murray
- Thomas Garner as Mr. Quartermane
- Robert Smith as Johann
- Maya Waterman as Shanty Woman
- Stan Bly as Pierre
- Robert William Madrigal as Dracula's Carriage Driver
- Nino Simon as Herr Delbruch
- Andy Parks as Conductor
- Daniel Bonjour as German Captain

== Reception ==
Critical reception has been predominantly negative. Dread Central and DVD Talk both rated the movie negatively, and Dread Central remarked that although Feifer "tries really hard on his minuscule budget to recreate the look, talk, and manner of a Victorian era vampire movie - not an ounce of it feels authentic, like an old PBS production by way of The Asylum". DVD Verdict panned the movie overall, stating that while they won't call it "the worst movie ever" it was "certainly a contender".
