= Amy Lyndon =

American actress and acting coach (born 1965)

- Born: October 15, 1965 (age 60); New Rochelle, New York, U.S.
- Occupations: Actress, acting coach

Amy Lyndon (born October 15, 1965) is an American actress and acting coach.

== Early life and education ==
Amy Lyndon was born in New Rochelle, New York. She studied with Stella Adler at the Stella Adler Conservatory and with Sanford Meisner at the Neighborhood Playhouse in New York City. She is an acting teacher and author of The Lyndon Technique: The 15 Guideline Map To Booking.

== Career ==
Lyndon’s work in film includes The UnMiracle with Stephen Baldwin and the Lionsgate feature films, Bram Stoker's Dracula's Guest and Chicago Massacre: Richard Speck. Lyndon also starred in the film Cursed Part 3 with Chris Pratt, written and directed by Rae Dawn Chong.

She has appeared in several television shows such as Days Of Our Lives, The Bold and the Beautiful and The Young and The Restless. Lyndon also appeared as a recurring guest lead on the American horror anthology television series, Freddy's Nightmares and directed the film Odessa starring Yolanda King.
