= Andrew Bryniarski =

American actor and bodybuilder

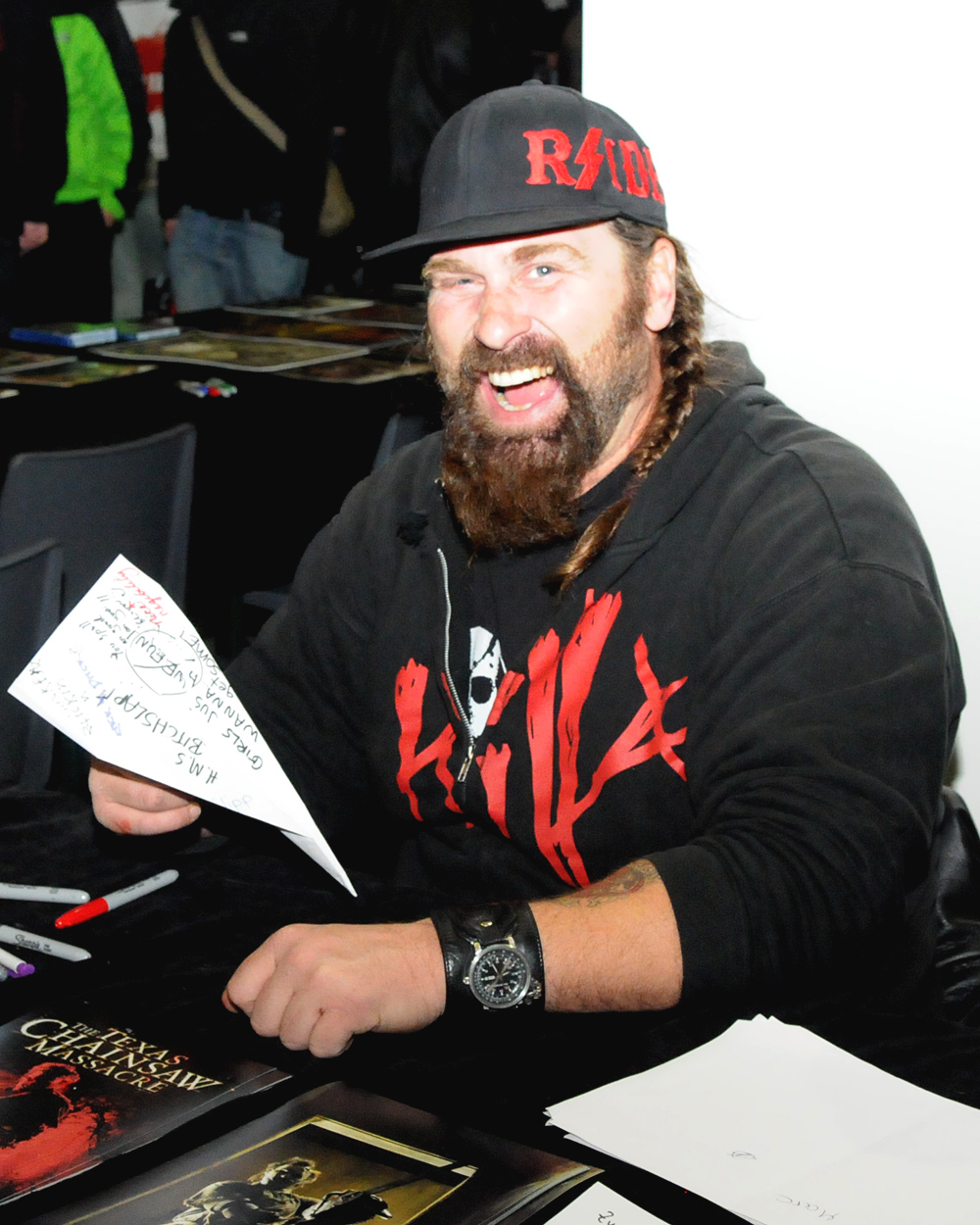
- Bryniarski in 2013
- Born: February 13, 1969 (age 57); Philadelphia, Pennsylvania, U.S.
- Occupations: Actor, bodybuilder
- Years active: 1990–present
- Height: 6 ft 5 in (196 cm)

Andrew Bryniarski (born February 13, 1969) is an American actor and former bodybuilder, best known for portraying Leatherface in the remake of The Texas Chain Saw Massacre and The Texas Chainsaw Massacre: The Beginning, Zangief in Street Fighter, and Steve Lattimer in The Program.

== Early life ==
Bryniarski was born in Philadelphia, on February 13, 1969.

== Career ==
Bryniarski was visiting a friend in Los Angeles, when he was discovered by a talent agent. The agent got him a part in Hudson Hawk. From then on, he was cast in several films that required his type, a muscular 6-foot-5-inch (196 cm) man.

== Filmography ==
Year	Title	Role	Notes
1990	Dragonfight	Bar Fight Spectator	
1991	Necessary Roughness	Wyatt Beaudry	
1991	Hudson Hawk	"Butterfinger"	
1992	Batman Returns	Charles "Chip" Shreck	
1993	The Program	Steve Lattimer	
1994	Cyborg 3: The Recycler	Jocko	TV movie
1994	Street Fighter	Zangief	
1995	Higher Learning	Knocko	
1995	Lois & Clark: The New Adventures of Superman	X	Episode: "Virtually Destroyed"
1999	Any Given Sunday	Patrick "Madman" Kelly	
2001	Pearl Harbor	Joe, The Boxer	
2002	Black Mask 2: City of Masks	Daniel "Iguana" Martinez	
2002	Scooby-Doo	Cavern Henchman	
2002	Rollerball	Halloran	
2002	Firefly	Crow	Episode: "The Train Job"
2002	The Lobo Paramilitary Christmas Special	Lobo	
2003	44 Minutes: The North Hollywood Shoot-Out	Larry Eugene Phillips, Jr.	
2003	The Texas Chainsaw Massacre	Thomas Brown Hewitt / "Leatherface"	
2004	The Curse of El Charro	"El Charro"	
2005	Seven Mummies	"Blade"	
2006	Bachelor Party Vegas	Security Beast	
2006	The Texas Chainsaw Massacre: The Beginning	Thomas Brown Hewitt / "Leatherface"	
2007	Chasing 3000	Gang Member	
2008	Stiletto	Nazi Biker	
2008	Bram Stoker's Dracula's Guest	Count Dracula	
2010	Burn Notice	Ed "Big Ed"	Episode: "Friends and Enemies"
2015	Some Kind of Hate	Lincoln's Father	
2015	Sky	Jesse	
2016	2017	Crow	
2018	American Dresser	Earl	
2021	Deadsville Rock n Roll Mysteries	Doogie Deviant (voice)	Episode: "Meet the Deviants!"
2023	Ice Nine Kills: Welcome to Horrorwood	Chainsaw-Wielding Stranger	short
2024	Ice Nine Kills Presents: Welcome to Horrorwood	Chainsaw-Wielding Silence	
