= James Bulger =

James Bulger may refer to:

- Whitey Bulger (1929–2018), organized crime boss and FBI informant
- James Bulger (1990–1993), English murder victim
