= Live at Montreux (Alice Cooper album) =

Live at Montreux 2005

Live album + DVD + HD DVD by Alice Cooper
- Released: May 2006
- Recorded: Montreux, Switzerland, 2005
- Genre: Rock, hard rock, heavy metal
- Length: 97:14(DVD) / 66:03(CD)
- Language: English
- Label: Eagle Vision
- Director: Romain Guelat, Thierry Amsallem
- Producer: Claude Nobs, Terry Shand, Geoff Kempin

CD chronology
Dirty Diamonds (2005)	Live at Montreux 2005 (2006)	Along Came a Spider (2008)

Alice Cooper DVD chronology
Alice Cooper: Brutally Live (2000)	Live at Montreux 2005 (2006)

Alice Cooper: Live at Montreux 2005 is a live video and album release by Alice Cooper. It was released worldwide in May 2006 as a combined DVD and CD package. In 2014 it was issued as a limited double vinyl release for Record Store Day under the title 'Live In Switzerland 2005'.

The concert was filmed and recorded on July 12, at the 2005 Montreux Jazz Festival in Montreux, Switzerland, at the Stravinski Auditorium, as part of Cooper's "Dirty Diamonds" World Tour.

== Track listing ==
=== DVD/Blu-ray ===
1. Opening credits – 0:16
2. "Department of Youth" – 2:40
3. "No More Mr. Nice Guy" – 3:04
4. "Dirty Diamonds" – 3:45
5. "Billion Dollar Babies" – 3:34
6. "Be My Lover" – 3:18
7. "Lost in America" – 4:31
8. "I Never Cry" – 2:50
9. "Woman of Mass Distraction" – 3:53
10. "I'm Eighteen" – 4:14
11. "Between High School and Old School" – 2:51
12. "What Do You Want from Me?" – 3:19
13. "Is It My Body?" – 3:00
14. "Go to Hell" – 2:56
15. "The Black Widow" (instrumental) – 2:54
16. "Drum Solo" (Instrumental) – 3:10
17. "Gimme" – 2:59
18. "Feed My Frankenstein" – 3:22
19. "Welcome to My Nightmare" – 2:57
20. "The Awakening" – 4:14
21. "Steven" – 1:47
22. "Only Women Bleed" – 3:46
23. "Ballad of Dwight Fry"–4:03
24. "Killer" – 2:24
25. "I Love the Dead" – 2:23
26. "School's Out" – 4:59
27. "Poison" – 4:52
28. "Wish I Were Born in Beverly Hills" – 3:09
29. "Under My Wheels" – 4:40
30. Closing credits – 1:24

=== CD ===
1. "Department of Youth" – 2:40
2. "No More Mr. Nice Guy" – 3:04
3. "Dirty Diamonds" – 3:43
4. "Billion Dollar Babies" – 3:25
5. "Be My Lover" – 3:17
6. "Lost in America" – 4:21
7. "I Never Cry" – 2:45
8. "Woman of Mass Distraction" – 3:46
9. "I'm Eighteen" – 4:11
10. "Between High School and Old School" – 2:53
11. "What Do You Want from Me?" – 3:16
12. "Is It My Body?" – 2:51
13. "Gimme" – 2:57
14. "Feed My Frankenstein" – 3:38
15. "Welcome to My Nightmare" – 2:35
16. "School's Out" – 4:36
17. "Poison" – 4:42
18. "Wish I Were Born in Beverly Hills" – 3:11
19. "Under My Wheels" – 4:12

== Personnel ==
- Thierry Amsallem – director
- Venus Barr – dancer, "Vampire", "Dominatrix"
- Paul Bassett – "Henchmen", stage technician
- Andrée Buchler – coordination, post producer
- Gilbert Cara – sound engineer
- Alice Cooper – lead vocals
- Calico Cooper – dancer, "The Nurse", "Whipdancer", backing vocals
- Calvin Cooper – dancer
- Chuck Garric – bass, backing vocals
- Eric Glardon – post producer, video
- Angella Grossi – dancer, "Seductress"
- Michael Heatley – liner notes
- Claire Higgins – production coordination
- Rosie Holley – associate producer, producer
- Damon Johnson – guitar, keyboards, backing vocals
- Geoff Kempin – executive producer
- Chris Leahy – "Henchmen", stage technician
- Randy Meullier – sound engineer
- Claude Nobs – executive producer
- Pat Nowak – "The Controller", "Executioner", "Henchmen", backing vocals, props
- David Richards – mixing
- Jean Ristori – post producer
- Ryan Roxie – guitar, backing vocals
- Melissa Roy – associate producer, producer
- Terry Shand – executive producer
- Eric Singer – drums, backing vocals
- André Vouilloz – production coordination
- Abbi Welch – production coordination
- Paul Bostic - monitor engineer

== Certifications ==
Region	Certification	Certified units/sales
Australia (ARIA)	Gold	7,500^{^}
^{^} Shipments figures based on certification alone.
