= Along Came a Spider (album) =

Along Came A Spider

Studio album by Alice Cooper
- Released: July 29, 2008
- Recorded: 2007–2008
- Studios: Wonderland Studios, Hampton Hacienda Lab, Undercity Recordings
- Genres: Hard rock; heavy metal
- Length: 44:17
- Label: Steamhammer
- Producers: Greg Hampton, Danny Saber, Alice Cooper

Alice Cooper chronology
Live at Montreux 2005 (2006)	Along Came A Spider (2008)	Welcome 2 My Nightmare (2011)

Professional ratings
Review scores
Source	Rating
AllMusic	3/5 stars
Jukebox:Metal	3/5 stars
Rolling Stone	3/5 stars

Along Came a Spider is the eighteenth solo and the twenty-fifth studio album overall by American rock musician Alice Cooper, released on July 29, 2008 by Steamhammer/SPV. A hard rock/heavy metal concept album, it chronicles the activities of a psychopathic serial killer known as 'Spider' and the eventual undoing of his plans. A commercial success, it ended up becoming Cooper's highest-charting studio effort in the United States since Hey Stoopid (1991).

== Background and release ==
The story-line for the concept album was first revealed on Cooper's radio show Nights with Alice Cooper. The theme of the album revolves around a "cool, calm and collected" serial killer known as 'Spider'. The police are baffled by the bodies of Spider's victims, which are cocooned in a silk web, and are each missing a leg. Spider's task is to collect eight legs to complete the construction of his own spider. However, things get complicated when he falls in love with his eighth victim. At the end of the album an internal voice is heard telling 'Spider' that 'We've been locked away here for twenty eight years Steven, we couldn't have done all those horrible things' thus revealing Spider as the character Steven from Welcome to My Nightmare.

Along Came a Spider was due for a 2007 release but problems with producer scheduling and tour commitments caused it to be pushed to mid-2008. Several demos and songs were prepared and short-listed during 2007 with further sessions for recording and writing taking place in February 2008. 75% of the album had been completed as of April 18, 2008. Cooper also planned to create a second part to the album, entitled 'The Night Shift,' but decided to make Welcome 2 My Nightmare instead.

== Critical reception ==
The release has earned mixed to positive reviews from various publications. For example, music critic David Jeffries of AllMusic stated that, even though Cooper had produced better concept albums before, in Along Came a Spider the artist "fills his lyrics with clever and gruesome wordplay". A review from Blabbermouth.net praised the release as "yet another example of an album made by an elder rock icon that manages to sound fresh and relevant".

== Track listing ==
No.	Title	Writer(s)	Length
1.	"Prologue / I Know Where You Live"	Alice Cooper, Danny Saber, Greg Hampton	4:21
2.	"Vengeance Is Mine" (feat. Slash)	Cooper, Saber, Hampton	4:26
3.	"Wake the Dead" (feat. Ozzy Osbourne)	Cooper, Saber, Ozzy Osbourne	3:53
4.	"Catch Me If You Can"	Cooper, Saber, Hampton	3:15
5.	"(In Touch With) Your Feminine Side"	Cooper, Chuck Garric, Keri Kelli, Damon Johnson	3:16
6.	"Wrapped in Silk"	Cooper, Saber, Hampton	4:17
7.	"Killed by Love"	Cooper, Garric, Kelli, James Bacchi	3:34
8.	"I'm Hungry"	Cooper, Saber, Hampton	3:58
9.	"The One That Got Away"	Cooper, Kelli, Jani Lane	3:21
10.	"Salvation"	Cooper, Saber, Hampton, Bernard Fowler	4:36
11.	"I Am the Spider / Epilogue"	Cooper, Saber, Hampton	5:21

2010 Re-release / iTunes bonus tracks
No.	Title	Writer(s)	Length
12.	"Shadow of Yourself"	Cooper, Saber, Hampton	3:29
13.	"I'll Still Be There"	Cooper, Saber, Hampton	3:50
14.	"Salvation" (Unplugged with string section)	Cooper, Saber, Hampton, Fowler	4:46

- As with a large portion of Cooper's back-catalogue being remastered and re-released through various distribution channels, Along Came A Spider has also received the same treatment. Re-released on CD in 2010, and distributed by Bigger Picture, it includes the three iTunes-only bonus tracks originally released alongside the album in 2008:

== Music video ==
Unlike Dragontown, The Eyes of Alice Cooper, and Dirty Diamonds, a music video was created to promote Along Came a Spider. Released on October 2, 2008, and directed by Rob Zombie bassist, Piggy D and Gabrielle Geiselman, the 10-minute-long music video stars Alice Cooper, Slash, Hazmat, Roxxi Dott, Howie Pyro, Dave Pino, Eric Singer and Peter Derek. It features a medley of three songs from the album: "Vengeance Is Mine", "(In Touch With Your) Feminine Side", and "Killed By Love".

== Personnel ==
- Alice Cooper – lead and backing vocals
- Danny Saber – lead guitar, bass, keyboards, backing vocals
- Greg Hampton – lead guitars, keyboards, backing vocals
- Chuck Garric – bass, backing vocals
- Eric Singer – drums

=== Guest musicians ===
- Keri Kelli – guitars (5, 7 and 9)
- Jason Hook – guitars (5)
- Slash – lead guitar (2)
- David Piribauer – drums (8 and 10)
- Ozzy Osbourne – backing vocals (3)
- Whitey Kirst – guitar (8)
- Bernard Fowler –Vocals/Vocal Arrangements (2 thru 10)

== Charts ==
Chart (2008)	Peak position
Australian Albums (ARIA)	147
Austrian Albums (Ö3 Austria)	37
Canadian Albums (Billboard)	19
Dutch Albums (Album Top 100)	76
Finnish Albums (Suomen virallinen lista)	31
French Albums (SNEP)	101
German Albums (Offizielle Top 100)	26
Hungarian Albums (MAHASZ)	32
Norwegian Albums (VG-lista)	33
Scottish Albums (Official Charts)	34
Swedish Albums (Sverigetopplistan)	25
Swiss Albums (Schweizer Hitparade)	37
UK Albums (Official Charts)	31
UK Rock & Metal Albums (Official Charts)	3
US Billboard 200	53
US Independent Albums (Billboard)	6
US Top Hard Rock Albums (Billboard)	6
US Top Rock Albums (Billboard)	22

== See also ==
- Alice Cooper discography
- Fictional portrayals of psychopaths
