= Suck (film) =

- Theatrical poster
- Directed by: Rob Stefaniuk
- Written by: Rob Stefaniuk
- Produced by: Robin Crumley; Brad Peyton; Jeff Rogers; Victoria Hirst
- Starring: Rob Stefaniuk; Jessica Paré; Malcolm McDowell; Iggy Pop; Alice Cooper
- Cinematography: D. Gregor Hagey
- Edited by: Michele Conroy
- Distributed by: Capri Films
- Release date: September 11, 2009 (Toronto)
- Country: Canada
- Language: English
- Budget: CAD$3.5 million

Suck is a 2009 vampire black comedy horror film starring, written and directed by Rob Stefaniuk. Stefaniuk stars alongside Canadian actress Jessica Paré, Nicole de Boer (Stefaniuk's castmate from the TV series Catwalk), Malcolm McDowell and rock artists Alice Cooper, Iggy Pop, Henry Rollins and Alex Lifeson of Rush. Production took place in and around Toronto in late 2008.

== Plot ==
The film follows a struggling rock band called the Winners as they tour across Canada and the United States. After band member Jennifer is turned into a vampire, the band quickly gains a following of groupies attracted to her newfound beauty. As their infamy grows, the vampire hunter Eddie Van Helsing learns that Jennifer is a vampire and vows to hunt her down.

While on tour, the band members are each turned into vampires, one by one. Although the band continues to grow in popularity, band member Joey loses interest in the vampire lifestyle after accidentally killing their producer, Victor, and eventually convinces Jennifer that they should become human again. After a brief altercation, Eddie agrees to help the band upon hearing of their plans to become human. They track down Queenie, the vampire who turned Jennifer, intending to kill him. During the fight, Queenie kills Sam and nearly kills Eddie, before he is stabbed in the heart by Joey. The band members become human again as a result of his death, and they happily return home.

Six months later, Joey and Jennifer are shown to have grown bored with their human lives in suburbia. They are approached by a bartender who had previously served at their gigs; he reveals himself to be an entity more powerful even than Queenie (the implication being that the bartender is Satan himself) and he offers them the opportunity to be even more powerful and more famous than they were as vampires. It is implied that Joey and Jennifer accept the offer, despite the chaos caused during their time as vampires.

== Cast ==
- Rob Stefaniuk as Joey Winner
- Jessica Paré as Jennifer
- Paul Anthony as Tyler
- Mike Lobel as Sam
- Chris Ratz as Hugo
- Alice Cooper as Bartender
- Malcolm McDowell as Eddie Van Helsing
- Dimitri Coats as Queenie
- Iggy Pop as Victor
- Dave Foley as Jeff
- Moby as Beef Bellows
- Henry Rollins as Rockin' Roger
- Alex Lifeson as Border Guard
- Danny Smith as Jerry
- Nicole de Boer as Susan
- Carole Pope as Club Bouncer
- Calico Cooper as Barmaid
- Barbara Mamabolo as Danielle

== Production ==
=== Filming ===
Filming commenced November 23, 2008 in the Toronto area. It was filmed on location, and many of the clubs throughout the film are underground clubs and bars in Toronto such as The Big Bop (accounting for three of the clubs, each floor representing a different city on the tour). Members of Toronto's goth scene were requested to perform as background extras for some of the club scenes.

The US Customs scenes were shot at Toronto's defunct International Marine Passenger Terminal.

Filming lasted 20 days, on a budget of about $3.5 million (CAD).

In the scene where Danielle sings "Night After Night", Eddie Van Helsing has flashbacks to his younger self. Footage from the 1973 film "O Lucky Man!", which starred Malcolm McDowell, was edited into the scene.

== Release ==
Rights to the film were acquired by Alliance Films. It premiered on September 11, 2009 at the Toronto International Film Festival and was part of the South by Southwest Film Festival (SXSW) 2010 in Austin, Texas. E1 Entertainment holds the rights for the Home video (Blu-ray and DVD), VOD, digital and TV sales.

== Reception ==
The film has a user rating of 6 due to mixed critic reviews on IMDb.

== Soundtrack listing ==
As this is a film about a band many songs are performed on screen. Those songs that are included in a more typical film score manner were often originally performed by the rock icons appearing in the film.

=== Original Songs ===
- I'm Coming To Get You - The Winners
- Going Nowhere - The Winners
- The Fool - The Winners
- So Close It Hurts - The Winners
- Suck - The Winners
- Take It - The Winners
- This Is Your Brain on Drugs - The Winners
- Moonlight Sonata - John Kastner
- Night After Night - Barbara Mamabolo
- Still Bleeding - Secretaries of Steak

=== Additional Songs ===
- I Am The Spider - Alice Cooper
- Here Comes The Night - David Bowie
- Oh! Sweet Nothin' - Velvet Underground
- Success - Iggy Pop
- Sympathy For the Devil - Styrofoam Bible
- T.V.Eye - The Stooges
- You Raised A Vampire - The Moog
- Crossroads - Robert Johnson
- Bright City - Groovy Religion
- 420 Ganja Song - Kidd Rasta & The Peacemakers
- Flesh and Bone - Burning Brides
- Goes Further - Burning Brides
- Old Emotions - Spoons
- Let You Down - Tin Star Orphans
- May Go Round - Spiral Beach
- Same Old Place - Blue Peter
- If One of Us Goes Further - Burning Brides

== See also ==
- Slapstick film
- Vampire film
