= Calico Cooper =

American singer, actress, and dancer (born 1981)

- Born: May 19, 1981 (age 45); Los Angeles, California, U.S.
- Education: Stella Adler Studio of Acting; The Groundlings; Upright Citizens Brigade Theatre
- Occupations: Singer; dancer; stage performer; choreographer; actress; comedian; model
- Years active: 1997–present
- Spouse: Jed Williams (m. 2015)
- Parents: Alice Cooper (father); Sheryl Cooper (mother)
- Musical career
- Genres: Rock; heavy metal
- Instrument: Vocals
- Member of: Beasto Blanco; Alice Cooper
- Website: officialcalicocooper.com

Calico Cooper (born May 19, 1981) is an American singer, dancer, stage performer, actress, comedian, and choreographer. She is the first-born daughter of shock rock singer Alice Cooper and dancer Sheryl Cooper. She began performing with her father occasionally since 1997 and was hired by him at age 18 for his Brutally Live tour. For the next decade, she toured with, and directed portions of, Alice Cooper's live shows, specializing in violent black comedy routines. In 2011 she left touring to concentrate on her acting career. Since 2012 she has been a vocalist and stage performer for the heavy metal band Beasto Blanco. Her film credits include minor roles in The Curse of El Charro (2005), Rolling (2007), a deleted scene in Halloween (2007), Dakota Skye (2008), Suck (2009), and an uncredited scene in Hall Pass (2011), and co-starring roles in Thirty Proof Coil (2010), 13/13/13 (2013), Welcome to Hell (2018), and the short film Fire Fucking Fire (2024). Her television credits include the character Lila Black in Bloomers (2011–2025) and guest starring as Jane Miller in a 2016 episode of Hawaii Five-0.

== Early life ==
Calico Cooper was born on May 19, 1981, to Alice and Sheryl Cooper, who resided at Benedict Canyon, Los Angeles. A year after her birth, the Coopers moved to Paradise Valley, Arizona. They also lived for some time in Chicago before relocating once again to Paradise Valley in 1985. In the early 1980s, Alice's continued substance abuse was putting a severe strain on his relationship with Sheryl, a strain which was exacerbated by the birth of Calico. Sheryl initiated divorce proceedings in November 1983. Alice finally committed to sobriety that year, and Sheryl reconciled with him months later in 1984. Sheryl, a professional dancer, enrolled Calico in dance at age 3. The Coopers felt it was important for their children to attend public school, and Calico's schooling included Hopi Elementary and Arcadia High School. While attending Arcadia High, she belonged to a dance company and professionally performed and competed at the national level in classical ballet, jazz, acrobatics, and tap. She also started instructing dance. In her teens, Cooper attracted tabloid attention with her awkward attempts at glamorous fashion. She remembers being mocked by the British press at the age of 14.

== With Alice Cooper ==
At the age of 16, Calico started performing roles in her father's touring stage shows. Her first role was occasional, specifically as one of the evil clowns who opened Alice's shows at the time. After graduating high school, she moved to Los Angeles to pursue an acting career. However, she then found work performing in her father's stage shows. At age 18, she was hired by Alice to perform multiple roles in and provide choreography and design costumes for his Brutal Planet tour. The most known character she portrayed in the tour was the dominatrix "bullwhip girl", for which she was instructed by Sheryl, who had previously portrayed the character. She also inherited the sadistic nurse character who often presided over Alice's beheading. With the latter character, Calico at first continued Sheryl's role—an "ingenue" or "1940s actress" that the audience would want to protect—but after a few years transformed the nurse into a character, "Nurse Rozetta", that the audience would hate and whose defeat would make Alice almost a hero. Cooper said "I really caught my confidence. All of a sudden, instead of the nurse just being sexy or provocative, I was like, "What if I made you hate her more than you hate Alice? I bet I could do that.'" A routine she performed in 2000, dressed as the nurse, involved Alice grabbing her by the neck and slamming her into the hatch of an overturned vehicle. During one show that year, at the Aerial Theater in Houston, Texas, Calico received a minor ankle laceration.

Her tour with Brutal Planet at first intimidated her as she, like her mother before, was the only woman not only among the band but among the merchandise staff, catering, and drivers, and she was cautious of overstepping. However, as she began making suggestions, her ideas were received enthusiastically by both those working the show and audiences. After this success, she stayed a regular in Alice's shows until 2011. When Chuck Garric joined Alice Cooper's live band as a bassist in 2002, he and Calico immediately bonded creatively and enthusiastically shared and discussed performance ideas with each other. Garric and other members of the band would occasionally play at bar shows when not on tour and sometimes would invite Calico to sing, presaging her joining his band Beasto Blanco in 2012.

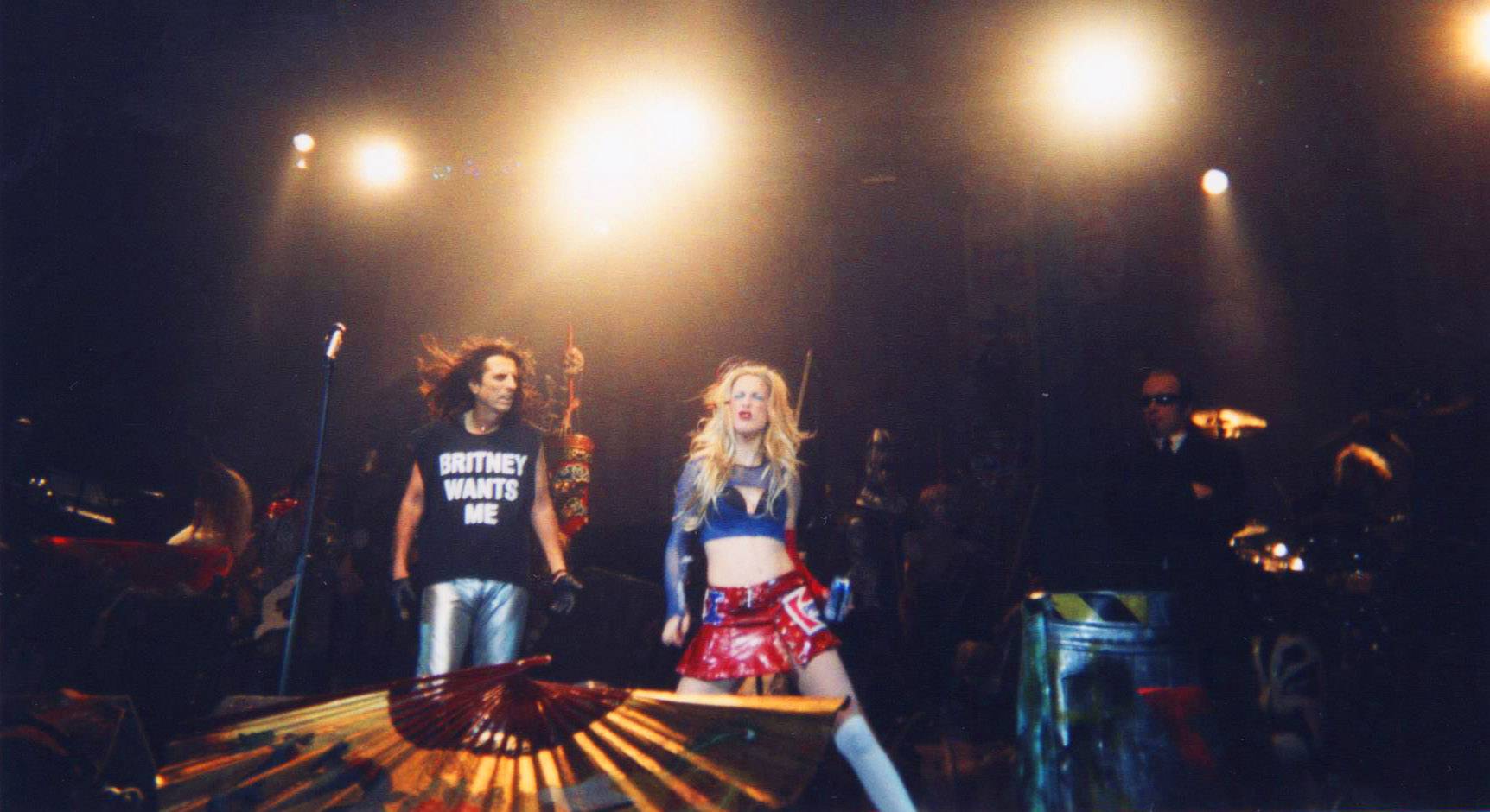
Calico Cooper (right) as part of Alice Cooper's (left) stage show in 2002.

During Alice's 2001–2003 Brutally Live and Dragontown tours, Calico portrayed Britney Spears in a satirical macabre comedic bit which ended in her fighting Alice, being dragged off stage by him, and Alice re-appearing with a mock-up of Calico-as-Spears' severed head impaled on a pole. During the bit, Alice would wear a shirt reading "Britney Wants Me" on the front and "Dead" on the back. On the Dirty Diamonds tour in 2005, Calico replaced the Britney character with a mock Paris Hilton who has her throat ripped out by a chihuahua, sending fake blood spurting into the audience. Another routine as Hilton involved her attempting to stab Alice only for him to deflect the blow, grab her by the hair, and drag her offstage. The Hilton character would come on during Alice's performance of "I Wish I Were Born in Beverley Hills". Calico in 2010 said that she felt that Spears and Hilton, whom she knows personally, understood the humor, and that one concert where she performed the Hilton bit, Hilton was in the audience. Other characters she portrayed on that tour included a vampire, a henchman, and the nurse character, the last of whom would hold up an imitation of Alice's severed head after his character was guillotined. She said in 2010 that sometimes there was backlash as to the propriety of what Alice would act out with his daughter. Her response was that she was now 27, was not getting hurt, and not playing a love interest. "People misunderstand, but there's always been blood, guts, incest. When Shakespeare did it, it was like, 'he's a genius!' but when Alice Cooper does it, it's like, 'That's gross!'" Alice in 2009 stated that, while on tour, Calico would not be able to fully clean off her bruising makeup between concerts, and when she and Alice would go to the mall together they would get concerned looks from strangers.

Cooper credits her stage shows with her father with establishing her in niche in stingingly provocative comedy. Her character would fall stairs and take pies to the face. She said in 2011 that since childhood she always tried to make people laugh, and "For all the years that I toured with my dad, the harder I could fall on my face, or the bigger reaction I could get, it didn't matter what language you spoke it was funny." The members of the show also liked to pull pranks, such as duct taping the guitarist of the opening act and throwing him out of the venue, hiding Calico's skirt so she had to come on stage in her underwear, or one time, the final show of Alice Cooper touring with Scorpions, when Alice and her conspired to have the male members of his band dress in lingerie and replace the dancing girls on the Scorpions' set.

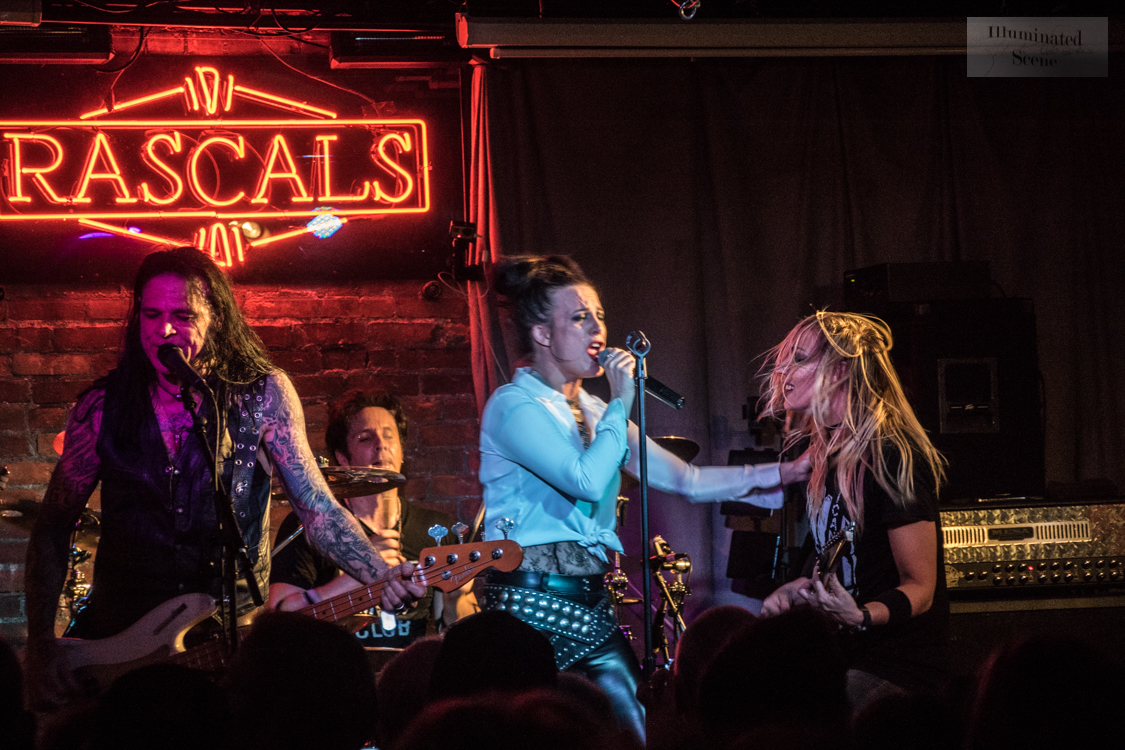
Cooper (center) performing as part of the Alice Cooper band (without Alice) on March 8, 2018, at Rascals Live, in Moline, Illinois.

In 2011, she stepped down from regularly touring with Alice to pursue her acting career. She has made concert appearances since. In the 2014 concert of Alice and Sheryl Cooper's annual charity concert Alice Cooper's Christmas Pudding, Calico and Sheryl both portrayed a ghoulish nurse character, at one point each of them gnawing on opposite ends of a baby doll. In 2017, Calico performed as the nurse character, getting roughed up during "Only Women Bleed" but coming back to torment Alice while he was straitjacketed singing "The Ballad of Dwight Fry".

== Acting and comedy career ==
In the mid-2000s, when not on tour with Alice Cooper, Calico acted in several independent films, mostly horror, including The Curse of El Charro, JunkfoodHorrorfest (2007), where she portrayed a "junkie serial killer", and Rolling (2007), where she portrayed a character using MDMA at a rave. A role in a deleted scene in the 2007 Halloween remake earned her Screen Actors Guild card. She played a lead role in The Visitor, which was in pre-production in 2008. Cooper portrayed Heather in Dakota Skye (2008), a barmaid in the horror film Suck (2009), and co-starred as the "Woman" character in Thirty Proof Coil (2010). Her first starring role in a film was in the 2010 horror film Thirty Proof Coil. She claims that she landed many horror movie roles due to her shows with Alice. When she left the Alice Cooper tours in 2011, at the advice of local actors she enrolled in master classes taught by Ivana Chubbuck. After taking the course, at Chubbuck's recommendation, she auditioned, successfully, for the improv comedy groups The Groundlings and Upright Citizens Brigade Theatre. She also studied with the Stella Adler Studio of Acting, Margie Haber, and Gordon Hunt. In 2011, she landed a starring role in the TV series Bloomers (2011–2018) as the recurring character Lila Black and made an uncredited cameo in Hall Pass (2011). She portrayed Marcy in 13/13/13 (2013) and co-starred in Welcome to Hell (2018), which incorporated the short Family Time originally from 2013, portraying Susan, a murderous pedophilic mother. She portrayed herself in The Curse of Denton Rose in 2020. Additional television roles include the murderer Jane Miller in a 2015 episode of Hawaii Five-0, and the character Tabitha in the 2016 episode "Danger & Thunder" in the children's comedy series Henry Danger. In 2016 she made an appearance on The Mindy Project. Cooper's directing and production work includes directing commercials and music videos and producing the crime-comedy film Love of Mass Destruction, which she co-starred in, the short film The Taxi Man, and the single-episode TV series The Normal Ones, a show she also wrote and co-starred in. In the 2024 short film Fire Fucking Fire, which debuted at Tribeca Festival in June, Cooper co-starred as the rock star love interest Meg opposite Ally (Rachel Paulson).

== With Beasto Blanco ==
In 2012, bassist Chuck Garric formed a band with Chris "Brother" Latham, Beasto Blanco, and Garric invited Cooper to perform backing vocals on some songs on their first album, Live Fast Die Loud (2013). She was reluctant at first as she had promised herself never to be in a band because she did not think she was a good singer. Garric told her "you're a really good actress so just act like you're a singer", and after going into the studio she discovered that she could sing to her satisfaction. Originally the plan had been for her to be a back-up singer, but during the recording process Garric increasingly featured her singing. When Beasto Blanco decided to go on a bar tour of Europe, Cooper decided to properly join the group. While she had previously told herself she would never be in a band, she realized "I want to be in this band. This is it." During their European tour, they developed a signature sound and visual style, melding heavy metal with a gruesome stage show, Cooper dressing in fishnet, chains, and leather, and often brandishing some form of weapon, including a Louisville slugger with nails through it and a CO_{2} gun. Calico said that when she focused her career on film and television work, she missed performing live, and joining Beasto Blanco allowed her spontaneity and opportunities to push boundaries. She considers her body an instrument: "I couldn't take up an instrument if I wanted to during Beasto because I'm so busy with my body." According to Cooper, on every tour she creates new costume pieces and does make-up for her character. The character, "Machine Girl", keeps evolving, as Cooper says she is "never done testing her boundaries." According to Cooper, "some tours she's meaner, some sexier, some downright ridiculous." Inspiration for "Machine Girl" includes the art of H. R. Giger and Frank Frazetta, with "maybe a little Magic: The Gathering sprinkled in". She recounts that one time a kid came up to her after a show and said she looked like Sindel from Mortal Kombat. "I told him he had a good eye, but if he told anyone my secret, I'd finish him. He got the joke, Thank God." In 2017, Cooper said her costumes are provided by Hazmat Design, and Cooper will look at "Vikings and baroque era gowns and ninja folklore" when collaborating with Hazmat to create the pieces. A reviewer of a concert by the band in 2022 compared the aesthetic of the group to Mad Max: Fury Road with the stagecraft of Alice Cooper.

Over the course of subsequent releases, Cooper's vocals contribution progressively increased. She shared lead vocals on a cover of her father's single "Feed My Frankenstein" on the band's second, self-titled recording, and Garric splits vocal duty evenly with Cooper on their latest recording, We Are (2019). In a 2020 interview, when asked how it is for her to be the only female in a rock band, she said everyone is treated the same, and she often forgets that she is the only girl.

Except for one time, we were playing a club and in a creepy quiet moment some guy yelled 'SHOW YOUR TITS!' My band just stood scary still for a moment. And started to take off their instruments. I just thought 'Oh no.... This is gonna turn into a brawl.' They were ready to throw down. But before they could the whole crowd turned on the guy and dragged him outside. I hope he healed well.

She said in a 2018 interview that when she first started developing her character (which in boots stands about 7 feet tall), she assumed that men would respond well to her, but she also then had women coming up to her afterwards to say how her performances are empowering for them. In 2023 the band signed with COP International.

== Influences ==
Cooper grew up hearing a variety of music. She states that her parents played a lot of classic artists such as Laura Nyro and Burt Bacharach, contemporary acts such as Zodiac Mindwarp and Guns N' Roses, as well as Elvis Presley and The Beatles. She said her mother is also very into classical and soundtracks. She also has mentioned enjoying her father's music and emo punk such as Alkaline Trio, Descendants, and The Marked Men. In 2020, she mentioned listening to genres outside of rock – classical, electronic, heavy blues – to incorporate into her music with Beasto Blanco. A review of Live Fast Die Loud, the first album of Beasto Blanco, compared the musical style of the group to Alice Cooper and White Zombie. Cooper describes her brand of comedy as physical slapstick. She states that growing up she watched Monty Python and Peter Sellers and she wanted to grow up to be the female Jim Carrey. She cites her top fashion influences as Alexander McQueen, Naeem Khan, and Zuhair Murad.

== Additional activities and personal life ==
In 2004, Cooper stated that dating was difficult for her because of the fame of her father. Cooper married the actor Jed Williams in 2015, in Maui, Hawaii. She volunteers at The Rock, one of the teen centers of Alice Cooper's Solid Rock, a non-profit founded by Alice and Sheryl Cooper and Chuck Savale. She helped set up a black box theatre for the center. She also has done modeling work.
