= The Curse of El Charro =

- Directed by: Rich Ragsdale
- Written by: Ryan R. Johnson
- Produced by: Kevin Ragsdale; Ryan R.Johnson; Andrew Bryniarski
- Starring: Danny Trejo; Drew Mia; Andrew Bryniarski; Kathryn Taylor; Heidi Androl; Kellydawn Malloy
- Cinematography: Jacques Haitkin
- Edited by: Michael Amundsen
- Music by: Rich Ragsdale
- Distributed by: Paramount Home Video; American World Pictures; GoDigital Media Group; Millenium Storm
- Release date: 2005
- Running time: 90 minutes
- Country: United States
- Language: English
- Budget: $200,000

The Curse of El Charro is a 2005 horror film starring Danny Trejo. The Curse of El Charro was released on DVD by Paramount Home Video in 2006.

== Plot ==
The film opens in 19th century Mexico, where El Charro (Andrew Bryniarski) acts as a wealthy, but diabolical land baron who falls madly in love with a sweet, innocent ancestor of the protagonist Maria. She scorns him, which prompts El Charro to kill everyone she cares about. However, Maria's ancestor still refuses El Charro, who decides to put a curse on Maria's family line. Many years after, we are brought to the present day 21st century, where we are introduced to Maria (Drew Mia) and her friend Chris (Heidi Androl), who are roommates in college. It is a Friday or so, and Maria, who we learn is suffering from repeating nightmares of her sister's suicide, is coerced to go with Chris, and her friends, Tanya (Kathryn Taylor) and Rosemary (KellyDawn Malloy) to Chris' uncle's Arizona cottage for the weekend. However upon reaching Arizona, the group is persistently attacked by El Charro in the form of revenant spirit with a machete. Eventually, El Charro kills every one of the girls except for Maria, who races toward a shrine of the archangel Michael (James Intveld). Using his heavenly abilities, Michael kills El Charro, and the curse is thus destroyed as well.

== Cast ==
- Andrew Bryniarski as "El Charro"
- Danny Trejo as voice of El Charro
- Drew Mia as Maria
- Kathryn Taylor as Tanya
- Heidi Androl as Christina
- KellyDawn Malloy as Rosemary
- Scott Greenall as Himself
- James Intveld as Archangel Michael
- Gary Bullock as The Purgatory Bartender
