= Alice Cooper: Brutally Live =

2000 Alice Cooper concert DVD

Brutally Live

Video by Alice Cooper
- Released: 5 December 2000
- Recorded: 19 July 2000
- Genre: Hard rock, heavy metal, shock rock
- Length: 105:00
- Label: Eagle Records
- Director: David Barnard
- Producer: Richard Leyland

Alice Cooper chronology
British Rock Symphony (2000)	Brutally Live (2000)	Live at Montreux 2005 (2006)

Brutally Live is a DVD of American rock singer Alice Cooper's concert on 19 July 2000 at the Labatt's Hammersmith Apollo in London, England, released later in the same year. It was re-released in 2003 on DVD accompanied with an audio CD of an edited version of the DVD's soundtrack.

== Track listing ==
1. "The Controler (Intro)" – 1:39
2. "Brutal Planet" (Alice Cooper, Bob Marlette) – 4:52
3. "Gimme" (Cooper, Marlette) – 4:52
4. "Go to Hell" (Cooper, Dick Wagner, Bob Ezrin) – 3:42
5. "Blow Me a Kiss" (Cooper, Marlette, Ezrin) – 3:06
6. "I'm Eighteen" (Cooper, Michael Bruce, Glen Buxton, Dennis Dunaway. Neal Smith) – 4:28
7. "Pick Up the Bones" (Cooper, Marlette) – 4:54
8. "Feed My Frankenstein" (Cooper, Nick Coler, Ian Richardson, Zodiac Mindwarp) – 4:18
9. "Wicked Young Man" (Cooper, Marlette) – 3:32
10. "Dead Babies" (Cooper, Bruce, Buxton, Dunaway, Smith) – 3:28
11. "Ballad of Dwight Fry" (Cooper, Bruce) – 4:39
12. "I Love the Dead" (Cooper, Ezrin) – 2:30
13. "Devil's Food" (Cooper, Ezrin, Jay) – :47
14. "The Black Widow" (Cooper, Wagner, Ezrin) – 3:52
15. "No More Mr. Nice Guy" (Cooper, Bruce) – 4:23
16. "It's Hot Tonight" (Cooper, Wagner, Ezrin) – 2:46
17. "Caught in a Dream" (Bruce) – 2:28
18. "It's the Little Things" (Cooper, Marlette) – 5:15
19. "Poison" (Cooper, Desmond Child, John McCurry) – 4:53
20. "Take It Like a Woman" (Cooper, Marlette) – 2:37
21. "Only Women Bleed" (Cooper, Wagner) – 4:17
22. "You Drive Me Nervous" (Cooper, Bruce, Ezrin) – 2:23
23. "Under My Wheels" (Bruce, Dunaway, Ezrin) – 4:41
24. "School's Out" (Cooper, Bruce, Buxton, Dunaway, Smith) – 4:41
25. "Billion Dollar Babies" (Cooper, Bruce, Smith) – 2:26
26. "My Generation" (Pete Townshend) – 1:28
27. "Elected" (Cooper, Bruce, Buxton, Dunaway, Ezrin) – 4:49

== Bonus video ==
- "Gimme"

== CD track listing ==
1. Brutal Planet 6:30
2. Gimme 4:51
3. Go to Hell 3:41
4. Blow Me a Kiss 3:06
5. I'm Eighteen 4:20
6. Feed My Frankenstein 4:26
7. Wicked Young Man 3:30
8. No More Mr. Nice Guy 4:18
9. It's Hot Tonight 2:51
10. Caught in a Dream 2:26
11. It's the Little Things 5:16
12. Poison 4:53
13. Take It Like a Woman 2:37
14. Only Women Bleed 4:15
15. You Drive Me Nervous 2:23
16. Under My Wheels 4:45
17. School's Out 4:36
18. Billion Dollar Babies 2:24
19. My Generation 1:29
20. Elected 4:49

== Personnel ==
- Alice Cooper – lead vocals
- Ryan Roxie – guitar, backing vocals
- Pete Friesen – guitar, backing vocals
- Greg Smith (as Frosty) – bass, backing vocals
- Eric Singer – drums, vocal background
- Teddy Andreadis (as ZigZag) – keyboards, background vocals
- Calico Cooper – "The Nurse", "Whipdancer", backing vocals
- Pat Nowak – "The Controller", "Executioner", backing vocals
- Venus Barr – "Inspiration"
- Angella Grossi – "Temptation"
- Calvin Cooper – dancer
- Dave Barnard – director
- Robert Jess Roth – concert director
- Geoff Kempin – executive producer
- Terry Shand – executive producer
- Richard Leyland – producer
- Melissa Roy – associate producer
- Bob Marlette – digital editing
- Frank Daranjo – liner notes
- Curtis Evans – packaging

== Certifications ==
Region	Certification	Certified units/sales
Australia (ARIA)	Gold	7,500^{^}
Canada (Music Canada)	Gold	5,000^{^}
^{^} Shipments figures based on certification alone.
