= Brutal Planet =

Studio album by Alice Cooper
- Released: June 6, 2000
- Recorded: 2000
- Studios: Blue Room, A&M (Hollywood)
- Genres: Industrial metal; hard rock
- Length: 47:58
- Label: Spitfire
- Producer: Bob Marlette

Alice Cooper chronology
The Life and Crimes of Alice Cooper (1999)	Brutal Planet (2000)	Mascara and Monsters: The Best of Alice Cooper (2001)

Singles from Brutal Planet
- 1. "Brutal Planet (promo only)" Released: 2000; 2. "Gimme" Released: August 2000; 3. "Blow Me a Kiss" Released: 2000; 4. "It's the Little Things (promo only)" Released: 2000

Professional ratings
Review scores
Source	Rating
AllMusic	3/5 stars
HM Magazine	
Metal Heads Forever Magazine	76/100
The Rolling Stone Album Guide	3/5 stars

Brutal Planet is the fourteenth solo and twenty-first studio album overall by American rock musician Alice Cooper, released in 2000. Musically, it sees Cooper tackling a much darker and heavier approach than on previous albums, with many songs approaching a somewhat modern-sounding, industrial/metal sound.

== Themes ==
Lyrically, Brutal Planet deals with themes of dark "social fiction", including domestic violence ("Take It Like a Woman"), prejudice ("Blow Me a Kiss"), psychopathic behavior ("It's the Little Things"), war ("Pick Up the Bones"), depression, suicide ("Sanctuary"), Neo-Nazism and school shootings ("Wicked Young Man"). The album was followed by a sequel, titled Dragontown (2001).

== Reception ==
Doug Van Pelt, editor of the alternative Christian music-oriented HM Magazine, found that the lyrics communicated biblical morals "in a very powerful way". Van Pelt stated further that the final argument is provided in the title track, which condemns the systems of judgment that the world uses. Moreover, "Blow Me a Kiss" urges the listener to think deeper about spiritual matters.

== Track listing ==
All tracks are written by Alice Cooper and Bob Marlette except where noted.

No.	Title	Writer(s)	Length
1.	"Brutal Planet"		4:40
2.	"Wicked Young Man"		3:50
3.	"Sanctuary"		4:00
4.	"Blow Me a Kiss"	Cooper, Marlette, Bob Ezrin	3:18
5.	"Eat Some More"		4:36
6.	"Pick Up the Bones"		5:14
7.	"Pessi-Mystic"	Cooper, Marlette, Brian Nelson	4:56
8.	"Gimme"		4:46
9.	"It's the Little Things"		4:11
10.	"Take It Like a Woman"		4:12
11.	"Cold Machines"		4:14

Japanese edition
No.	Title	Length
12.	"Can't Sleep, Clowns Will Eat Me"	4:09

2001 tour edition bonus tracks
No.	Title	Writer(s)	Length
12.	"It's the Little Things" (live)		5:19
13.	"Wicked Young Man" (live)		3:32
14.	"Poison" (live)	Cooper, Desmond Child, John McCurry	4:52
15.	"My Generation" (live)	Pete Townshend	1:32
16.	"Total Rock Rockumentary"		35:48

== Personnel ==
- Alice Cooper – vocals
- Ryan Roxie – guitars
- Phil X – guitars
- China – guitars
- Eric Singer – drums
- Bob Marlette – rhythm guitar, bass, keyboards

Additional musicians

- Sid Riggs – additional programming, sound design
- Eva King – strings arrangement
- Natalie Delaney – backing vocals (track 1)

Production

- Produced by Bob Marlette
- Executive producer – Bob Ezrin
- Engineered, mixed and arranged by Bob Marlette
- Additional engineering – Dave Reed, German Villacorta
- Assistant engineers – German Villacorta, Jaime Sickora
- Mastered by Dave Collins
- Recorded at the Blue Room, Woodland Hills, CA and the A&M Studios, Los Angeles, CA
- Mixed, Mastered at the A&M Studios, Los Angeles, CA

== Charts ==
Chart (2000)	Peak position
Austrian Albums (Ö3 Austria)	49
German Albums (Offizielle Top 100)	23
Scottish Albums (Official Charts)	32
Swedish Albums (Sverigetopplistan)	31
Swiss Albums (Schweizer Hitparade)	66
UK Albums (Official Charts)	38
UK Rock & Metal Albums (Official Charts)	5
US Billboard 200	193
US Independent Albums (Billboard)	11
