= Dragontown =

Studio album by Alice Cooper
- Released: September 18, 2001
- Recorded: 2001
- Genre: Industrial metal; hard rock
- Length: 50:48; 69:11 (Special Edition)
- Label: Spitfire
- Producer: Alice Cooper, Bob Marlette

Alice Cooper chronology
The Definitive Alice Cooper (2001)	Dragontown (2001)	The Essentials: Alice Cooper (2002)

Special Edition

Dragontown is the fifteenth solo and twenty-second studio album overall by American rock musician Alice Cooper. It was released in 2001 on Spitfire Records. Like Brutal Planet, the album displays a heavier metal style than many of his previous releases. It peaked on Billboard's "Top Independent Albums" Chart at #12, and the Billboard 200 at #197, his lowest album chart performance since 1983’s DaDa, which did not chart at all.

This is the first Alice Cooper studio album to contain no singles. Although Cooper toured the album with his Descent into Dragontown tour in 2001 and 2002, only four Dragontown songs – "Sex, Death and Money", "Fantasy Man", "Every Woman Has a Name", and "Triggerman" – were performed at all during this supporting tour, with only "Sex, Death and Money" and "Fantasy Man" remaining in the setlist to the end. With the exception of five performances of "Disgraceland" in July 2003 during the Bare Bones Tour, nothing from Dragontown has ever been performed live subsequent to the end of the album's supporting tour.

Professional ratings
Review scores
Source	Rating
Allmusic	Link
Rolling Stone	(favorable) link
HM Magazine	

== Story and themes ==
Doug Van Pelt, editor of the Christian music oriented HM Magazine, likened Cooper to C.S. Lewis, stating that he "grabs the devil's microphone and attempts to spill his guts and reveal his wicked schemes." Van Pelt further states that "It's Much Too Late" exposes "unrestrained truth" in stating that "The road to hell is littered with nice guys and good intentions..." and likens "Sex, Death and Money" to Proverbs 5 and isn't really about 'Sex, Death, and Money, but talks against it, as the Bible states.

"Somewhere in the Jungle" addresses the issue of genocide and tribal warfare in Africa.

The track Disgraceland sees Cooper deliver verses while impersonating Elvis Presley. The song relates to Presley's final years and subsequent death and of the track, Cooper has said: "I'm sort of doing a commentary on the absurdity of it, the fact that the greatest rock 'n' roll hero of all time died on a toilet."

== Track listing ==
All tracks are written by Alice Cooper and Bob Marlette, except where noted.

No.	Title	Length
1.	"Triggerman"	4:00
2.	"Deeper"	4:36
3.	"Dragontown"	5:06
4.	"Sex, Death and Money"	3:39
5.	"Fantasy Man"	4:05
6.	"Somewhere in the Jungle"	5:22
7.	"Disgraceland"	3:34
8.	"Sister Sara"	4:35
9.	"Every Woman Has a Name"	3:45
10.	"I Just Wanna Be God"	3:53
11.	"It's Much Too Late"	4:40
12.	"The Sentinel"	3:53

A special edition was released on September 24, 2002, limited to 7,500 units. It includes the original album and a bonus disc with four additional tracks.

No.	Title	Writer(s)	Length
1.	"Can't Sleep, Clowns Will Eat Me"		4:09
2.	"Go to Hell" (live)	Cooper, Dick Wagner, Bob Ezrin	3:48
3.	"Ballad of Dwight Fry" (live)	Cooper, Michael Bruce	4:27
4.	"Brutal Planet" (remix)		5:27

== Personnel ==
- Alice Cooper - Vocals
- Ryan Roxie - Guitar
- Greg Smith - Bass

=== Session musicians ===
- Tim Pierce - Guitar
- Wayne Swinny - Guitar
- Bob Marlette - Rhythm Guitar, Bass, Keyboards and programming, String arrangement
- Sid Riggs - Keyboards and programming
- Teddy Andreadis - Backing vocals
- Eric Dover - Backing vocals
- Calico Cooper - Backing vocals
- Gionvanna Morana - Backing vocals
- Kenny Aronoff - Drums

== Charts ==
Chart (2001)	Peak position
Australian Albums (ARIA)	182
Austrian Albums (Ö3 Austria)	75
French Albums (SNEP)	142
German Albums (Offizielle Top 100)	54
Scottish Albums (OCC)	98
Swedish Albums (Sverigetopplistan)	41
Swiss Albums (Schweizer Hitparade)	98
UK Albums (OCC)	87
UK Rock & Metal Albums (OCC)	6
US Billboard 200	197
US Independent Albums (Billboard)	12
