= Classicks =

Compilation album by Alice Cooper
- Released: September 5, 1995
- Genre: Glam metal, hard rock
- Length: 61:46
- Label: Epic
- Producer: Various

Alice Cooper chronology
The Last Temptation (1994)	Classicks (1995)	A Fistful of Alice (1997)

Professional ratings
Review scores
Source	Rating
Allmusic	2.5/5 stars
The Rolling Stone Album Guide	2/5 stars

Classicks is a compilation album by Alice Cooper, released by Epic Records in September, 1995. This release was to mark the end of Cooper's record contract with Epic Records, which had spanned three studio albums. Alice suggested its title.

As of 2005, Classicks is available as a CD / DVD set comprising Classicks and "Trashes The World", respectively. This set is also notable for the inclusion of Fire, only available as a B-side.

== Track listing ==
1. "Poison" (Desmond Child, Alice Cooper, John McCurry) – 4:30
2. "Hey Stoopid" (Cooper, Vic Pepe, Bob Pfeifer, Jack Ponti) – 4:33
3. "Feed My Frankenstein" (Nick Coler, Cooper, Ian Richardson) – 4:44
4. "Love's a Loaded Gun" (Cooper, Pepe, Ponti) – 4:11
5. "Stolen Prayer" (Cooper, Chris Cornell) – 5:35
6. "House of Fire" (Child, Cooper, Joan Jett) – 3:46
7. "Lost in America" (Cooper, Dan Wexler) – 3:52
8. "It's Me" (Jack Blades, Cooper, Tommy Shaw) – 4:37
9. "Under My Wheels" (Live) (Michael Bruce, Dennis Dunaway, Bob Ezrin) – 3:41
10. "Billion Dollar Babies" (Live) (Bruce, Cooper, Neal Smith) – 3:36
11. "I'm Eighteen" (Live) (Bruce, Glen Buxton, Cooper, Dunaway, Smith) – 4:34
12. "No More Mr. Nice Guy" (Live) (Bruce, Cooper) – 3:11
13. "Only Women Bleed" (Live) (Cooper, Wagner) – 4:06
14. "School's Out" (Live) (Bruce, Buxton, Cooper, Dunaway, Smith) – 3:46
15. "Fire" (Jimi Hendrix) – 3:02
- Tracks 1, 6 from Trash
- Tracks 2–4 from Hey Stoopid
- Tracks 5, 7–8 from The Last Temptation
- Tracks 9–14 were previously released on the "Trashes the World" video.
- Track 15 was a 1991 B-side from "Love's a Loaded Gun", previously unreleased in the U.S.

== Charts ==
Weekly chart performance for Classicks
Chart (1995)	Peak position
Australian Albums (ARIA)	133
