= Hell Is =

Compilation album by Alice Cooper
- Released: 2002/2003
- Genre: Hard rock, heavy metal
- Length: 74:33
- Label: Sony UK

Alice Cooper chronology
The Essentials: Alice Cooper (2002)	Hell Is (2002)	The Eyes of Alice Cooper (2003)

Professional ratings
Review scores
Source	Rating
Allmusic	3/5 stars

Hell Is is a compilation album by Alice Cooper. It was released in 2003 and featured many of his best-known songs of the late 1980s and early 1990s.

== Track listing ==
1. "Poison" - 4:30
2. "House of Fire" - 3:45
3. "Hell Is Living Without You" - 4:11
4. "Bed of Nails" - 4:19
5. "Only My Heart Talkin'" - 4:45
6. "Hey Stoopid" - 4:32
7. "Love's a Loaded Gun" - 4:11
8. "Feed My Frankenstein" - 4:44
9. "Hurricane Years" - 3:58
10. "Lost in America" - 3:52
11. "Stolen Prayer" - 5:34
12. "It's Me" - 4:37
13. "Cleansed by Fire" - 6:12
14. "Fire" (Jimi Hendrix) - 3:01
15. "Go to Hell" [Live] - 5:30
16. "School's Out" [Live] - 3:53
