= Appetite for Destruction Tour =

1987–88 concert tour by Guns N' Roses

- Tour by Guns N' Roses
- A poster advertising Guns N' Roses as the opening band for Aerosmith
- Location: Asia; Europe; North America; Oceania
- Associated album: Appetite for Destruction
- Start date: August 14, 1987
- End date: December 19, 1988
- Legs: 7
- No. of shows: 176

Guns N' Roses concert chronology
- Appetite for Destruction Tour (1987–1988); Use Your Illusion Tour (1991–1993)

The Appetite for Destruction Tour was a tour by the American hard rock band Guns N' Roses in 1987 and 1988 to promote their debut album Appetite for Destruction, which was released in July 1987. During the 16-month tour, the band opened for bands The Cult, Mötley Crüe, Alice Cooper, Iron Maiden, Aerosmith, and headlined shows across four continents.

It is the only tour in which the classic lineup of Axl Rose, Slash, Izzy Stradlin, Duff McKagan, and Steven Adler performed together, aside from opening four shows in at Los Angeles Memorial Coliseum for The Rolling Stones in October 1989.

"We started out as a hardcore band and we toured our fucking asses off," Slash recalled. "Next thing you know, we've turned into pop stars."

== Background ==
On August 20, 1988, Guns N' Roses performed at the Monsters of Rock festival at Donington Park in Castle Donington, England. At the start of their set, the capacity crowd of over 100,000 began jumping and surging forward. Despite Axl Rose's requests that the crowd move away from the stage, two fans were trampled to death. Media largely blamed the band for the tragedy, and reported that they continued playing despite the dangerous conditions. However, the venue's head of security noted that GN'R had not been aware of the extent of fan injuries, had immediately halted their set when requested to do so, and had attempted to calm the crowd.

The band's show at Texas Stadium on September 17, 1988, is remembered by the band as one of their worst performances. "The band completely fell apart in front of this massive audience," recalled Slash. "It was desperate on stage, trying to keep everything together. I have nightmares about it."

== Opening acts ==
- Faster Pussycat
- The Quireboys
- Ezo
- Funhouse
- Junkyard
- L.A. Guns
- T.S.O.L.
- U.D.O.
- Zodiac Mindwarp and the Love Reaction
- Kings of the Sun
- The Angels (Angel City)
- Knightshade

== Tour dates ==
List of 1987 concerts
Date	City	Country	Venue
June 19, 1987	London	England	Marquee Club
June 22, 1987	London	England	Marquee Club
June 28, 1987	London	England	Marquee Club
August 14, 1987	Halifax	Canada	Halifax Metro Centre
August 15, 1987	Moncton	Canada	Moncton Coliseum
August 17, 1987	Montreal	Canada	Verdun Auditorium
August 18, 1987	Waterloo	Canada	Super Skate 7
August 19, 1987	Toronto	Canada	CNE Stadium
August 21, 1987	Detroit	United States	State Theatre
August 25, 1987	Winnipeg	Canada	Winnipeg Arena
August 26, 1987	Edmonton	Canada	Edmonton Convention Centre
August 27, 1987	Calgary	Canada	Max Bell Centre
August 29, 1987	Vancouver	Canada	Pacific Coliseum
August 30, 1987	Seattle	United States	Paramount Theatre
September 2, 1987	San Francisco	United States	The Warfield
September 3, 1987	Santa Cruz	United States	Santa Cruz Civic Auditorium
September 4, 1987	San Diego	United States	SDSU Open Air Theater
September 5, 1987	Long Beach	United States	Long Beach Arena
September 6, 1987	Tucson	United States	Tucson Garden
September 7, 1987	Phoenix	United States	The Mason Jar
September 8, 1987	El Paso	United States	El Paso County Coliseum
September 11, 1987	San Antonio	United States	The Sunken Gardens
September 12, 1987	Austin	United States	Palmer Auditorium
September 13, 1987	Dallas	United States	Bronco Bowl Auditorium
September 16, 1987	Houston	United States	Houston Music Hall
September 17, 1987	New Orleans	United States	Saenger Theatre
September 29, 1987	Hamburg	West Germany	Markthalle
September 30, 1987	Düsseldorf	West Germany	Gate 3
October 2, 1987	Amsterdam	Netherlands	Paradiso
October 4, 1987	Newcastle	England	Newcastle City Hall
October 5, 1987	Nottingham	England	Nottingham Rock City
October 6, 1987	Manchester	England	Manchester Apollo Theatre
October 7, 1987	Bristol	England	Colston Hall
October 8, 1987	London	England	Hammersmith Odeon
October 16, 1987	Bay Shore	United States	The Sundance
October 17, 1987	Allentown	United States	Airport Road Music Hall
October 18, 1987	Baltimore	United States	Hammerjack's
October 20, 1987	Philadelphia	United States	Trocadero Theatre
October 21, 1987	Albany	United States	Palace Theatre
October 23, 1987	New York City	United States	The Ritz
October 25, 1987	Poughkeepsie	United States	The Chance
October 26, 1987	Providence	United States	The Living Room
October 27, 1987	Boston	United States	Paradise Rock Club
October 29, 1987	New York City	United States	L'Amour
October 30, 1987	New York City	United States	CBGB's
October 31, 1987	Syracuse	United States	The Lost Horizon
November 1, 1987	Washington, D.C.	United States	The Bayou
November 3, 1987	Mobile	United States	Mobile Municipal Auditorium
November 4, 1987	Albany	United States	Albany Civic Center
November 6, 1987	Lafayette	United States	Cajundome
November 7, 1987	New Orleans	United States	Lakefront Arena
November 8, 1987	Jackson	United States	Mississippi Coliseum
November 10, 1987	Huntsville	United States	Von Braun Civic Center
November 11, 1987	Charlotte	United States	Charlotte Coliseum
November 13, 1987	Savannah	United States	Savannah Civic Center
November 14, 1987	Columbia	United States	Carolina Coliseum
November 15, 1987	Greensboro	United States	Greensboro Coliseum
November 17, 1987	Knoxville	United States	Knoxville Civic Coliseum
November 18, 1987	Birmingham	United States	Jefferson Civic Center
November 20, 1987	Atlanta	United States	Omni Coliseum
November 21, 1987	Chattanooga	United States	UTC Arena
November 22, 1987	Atlanta	United States	Omni Coliseum
November 24, 1987	Lakeland	United States	Lakeland Civic Center
November 25, 1987	Lakeland	United States	Lakeland Civic Center
November 27, 1987	Jacksonville	United States	Jacksonville Coliseum
November 28, 1987	Fort Myers	United States	Lee County Civic Center
November 29, 1987	Pembroke Pines	United States	Hollywood Sportatorium
December 3, 1987	McAllen	United States	La Villa Real Convention Center
December 4, 1987	Dallas	United States	Fair Park Coliseum
December 5, 1987	Houston	United States	Sam Houston Coliseum
December 7, 1987	San Antonio	United States	Cameo Theater
December 8, 1987	Midland	United States	Chaparral Center
December 11, 1987	Cape Girardeau	United States	Show Me Center
December 12, 1987	Louisville	United States	Louisville Gardens
December 17, 1987	Saint Paul	United States	Roy Wilkins Auditorium
December 18, 1987	Chicago	United States	UIC Pavilion
December 19, 1987	Madison	United States	Dane County Veterans Memorial Coliseum
December 26, 1987	Pasadena	United States	Perkins Palace
December 27, 1987	Pasadena	United States	Perkins Palace
December 28, 1987	Pasadena	United States	Perkins Palace
December 30, 1987	Pasadena	United States	Perkins Palace
December 31, 1987	Los Angeles	United States	The Glamour

List of 1988 concerts
Date	City	Country	Venue
January 5, 1988	Santa Monica	United States	Santa Monica Civic Auditorium
January 14, 1988	Los Angeles	United States	Coconut Teaszer
January 21, 1988	Los Angeles	United States	The Cathouse
January 31, 1988	New York City	United States	The Limelight
February 2, 1988	New York City	United States	The Ritz
February 4, 1988	Sacramento	United States	Crest Theatre
February 5, 1988	San Francisco	United States	The Warfield
February 6, 1988	Fresno	United States	Warnors Theatre
February 8, 1988	San Diego	United States	Montezuma Hall
February 9, 1988	Anaheim	United States	The Celebrity Theater
February 10, 1988	Anaheim	United States	The Celebrity Theater
February 12, 1988	Phoenix	United States	Celebrity Theatre
April 26, 1988	Burlington	United States	Burlington Memorial Auditorium
April 27, 1988	Oshkosh	United States	Oshkosh Conference Hall
April 29, 1988	Rockford	United States	Coronado Theatre
April 30, 1988	Danville	United States	Danville Civic Center
May 1, 1988	Toledo	United States	Toledo Sports Arena
May 3, 1988	Grand Rapids	United States	DeVos Performance Hall
May 5, 1988	Cleveland	United States	Cleveland Music Hall
May 6, 1988	Saginaw	United States	Wendler Arena
May 7, 1988	Detroit	United States	State Theatre
May 9, 1988	New York City	United States	Felt Forum
May 10, 1988	Upper Darby Township	United States	Tower Theater
May 11, 1988	Boston	United States	Orpheum Theatre
May 13, 1988	Moncton	Canada	Moncton Coliseum
May 14, 1988	Halifax	Canada	Halifax Metro Centre
May 16, 1988	Quebec City	Canada	Quebec Coliseum
May 17, 1988	Montreal	Canada	Montreal Forum
May 18, 1988	Ottawa	Canada	Ottawa Civic Arena
May 20, 1988	Toronto	Canada	CNE Stadium
May 23, 1988	Winnipeg	Canada	Winnipeg Arena
May 25, 1988	Edmonton	Canada	Northlands Coliseum
May 27, 1988	Calgary	Canada	The Saddledome
May 30, 1988	Vancouver	Canada	Pacific Coliseum
May 31, 1988	Spokane	United States	Spokane Coliseum
June 1, 1988	Seattle	United States	Seattle Coliseum
June 3, 1988	Salt Lake City	United States	Salt Palace
June 5, 1988	Mountain View	United States	Shoreline Amphitheatre
June 6, 1988	Sacramento	United States	Cal Expo Amphitheatre
July 9, 1988	Phoenix	United States	Celebrity Theatre
July 10, 1988	Phoenix	United States	Celebrity Theatre
July 17, 1988	Hoffman Estates	United States	Poplar Creek Music Theater
July 19, 1988	Richfield	United States	Richfield Coliseum
July 20, 1988	Wheeling	United States	Wheeling Civic Center
July 22, 1988	Cape Girardeau	United States	Show Me Center
July 24, 1988	Dallas	United States	Starplex Amphitheater
July 26, 1988	Bonner Springs	United States	Sandstone Amphitheater
July 27, 1988	Ames	United States	Hilton Coliseum
July 29, 1988	East Troy	United States	Alpine Valley Music Theatre
July 30, 1988	Mears	United States	Val-Du-Lakes Amphitheater
August 1, 1988	Cincinnati	United States	Riverbend Music Center
August 2, 1988	Indianapolis	United States	Market Square Arena
August 4, 1988	Philadelphia	United States	The Spectrum
August 5, 1988	Philadelphia	United States	The Spectrum
August 6, 1988	Saratoga Springs	United States	Saratoga Performing Arts Center
August 7, 1988	Middletown	United States	Orange County Fairgrounds Stadium (Westwood 1/Pepsi Concert Series 1988 (#5))
August 9, 1988	Weedsport	United States	Weedsport Speedway
August 11, 1988	Clarkston	United States	Pine Knob Music Theatre
August 12, 1988	Clarkston	United States	Pine Knob Music Theatre
August 13, 1988	Clarkston	United States	Pine Knob Music Theatre
August 16, 1988	East Rutherford	United States	Giants Stadium
August 17, 1988	Columbia	United States	Merriweather Post Pavilion
August 20, 1988	Castle Donington	England	Donington Park
August 24, 1988	Mansfield	United States	Great Woods Amphitheater
August 25, 1988	Mansfield	United States	Great Woods Amphitheater
August 26, 1988	Mansfield	United States	Great Woods Amphitheater
August 28, 1988	Thornville	United States	Buckeye Lake Music Center
August 30, 1988	Wilkes-Barre	United States	Pocono Downs
August 31, 1988	Pittsburgh	United States	Civic Arena
September 2, 1988	Nashville	United States	Starwood Amphitheatre
September 3, 1988	St. Louis	United States	St. Louis Arena
September 8, 1988	Concord	United States	Concord Pavilion
September 9, 1988	Sacramento	United States	Cal Expo Amphitheater
September 10, 1988	Mountain View	United States	Shoreline Amphitheater
September 12, 1988	Chandler	United States	Compton Terrace
September 14, 1988	Costa Mesa	United States	Pacific Amphitheatre
September 15, 1988	Costa Mesa	United States	Pacific Amphitheatre
September 17, 1988	Irving	United States	Texas Stadium (Survival of the Fittest 1988)
December 4, 1988	Tokyo	Japan	NHK Hall
December 5, 1988	Osaka	Japan	Osaka Festival Hall
December 7, 1988	Tokyo	Japan	Nakano Sun Plaza Hall
December 9, 1988	Tokyo	Japan	NHK Hall
December 10, 1988	Tokyo	Japan	Budokan
December 14, 1988	Melbourne	Australia	Melbourne Sports and Entertainment Centre
December 15, 1988	Melbourne	Australia	Melbourne Sports and Entertainment Centre
December 17, 1988	Sydney	Australia	Sydney Entertainment Centre
December 19, 1988	Auckland	New Zealand	Mount Smart Stadium

== Personnel ==
Classic "Appetite for Destruction" line-up

- Axl Rose – lead vocals
- Slash – lead guitar, talkbox, slide guitar, backing vocals
- Izzy Stradlin – rhythm guitar, backing vocals
- Duff McKagan – bass, backing vocals
- Steven Adler – drums, backing vocals

Substitute musicians

- Fred Coury – drums (December 17, 1987 – January 5, 1988)
- Kid "Haggis" Chaos – bass, backing vocals (May 27, 1988)
