= Trashes the World =

Video by Alice Cooper
- Released: 1990 VHS; 2004 DVD
- Recorded: December 13th/14th, 1989 at The NEC, Birmingham, United Kingdom
- Genre: Hard rock; heavy metal; glam metal; shock rock
- Length: 94 minutes
- Label: Sony / BMG
- Director: Nigel Dick
- Producer: Lisa Hollingshead

Alice Cooper chronology
Video Trash (1989)	Trashes the World (1990)	Prime Cuts: The Alice Cooper Story (1991)

Alice Cooper Trashes the World is a live concert video by American rock musician Alice Cooper. The concert was filmed in Birmingham, England, December 1989, during Cooper's tour in support of his commercially successful album Trash.

== Track listing ==
1. "Trash"
2. "Billion Dollar Babies"
3. "I'm Eighteen"
4. "I'm Your Gun"
5. "Desperado"
6. "House of Fire"
7. "No More Mr. Nice Guy"
8. "This Maniac's in Love with You"
9. "Steven"
10. "Welcome to My Nightmare"
11. "Ballad of Dwight Fry"
12. "Gutter Cats Vs The Jets"
13. "Only Women Bleed"
14. "I Love the Dead"
15. "Poison"
16. "Muscle of Love"
17. "Spark in the Dark"
18. "Bed of Nails"
19. "School's Out"
20. "Under My Wheels"
21. End credits - "Only My Heart Talkin'"

== The band ==
- Alice Cooper – vocals
- Al Pitrelli – guitar
- Pete Friesen – guitar
- Derek Sherinian – keyboards
- Tommy Caradonna – bass
- Jonathan Mover – drums
- Devon Meade – backing vocals
