= The Last Temptation (comic) =

- Date: 1994–1995
- No. of issues: 3
- Publisher: Marvel Comics (Marvel Music)

Creative team
- Writers: Neil Gaiman (in collaboration with Alice Cooper)
- Artists: Michael Zulli

Original publication
- Issues: 3
- Date of publication: 1994–1995
- Language: English

The Last Temptation is an American horror comic book written by Neil Gaiman and illustrated by Michael Zulli, created in collaboration with musician Alice Cooper. Originally published in three issues in 1994–1995 by Marvel Comics under its Marvel Music imprint, it accompanied Cooper's 1994 concept album The Last Temptation.

The comic concerns a teenager who encounters a supernatural showman offering him an escape from the prospect of adulthood. Drawing on Cooper's stage persona, the story explores adolescent anxieties, theatrical illusion and temptation.

The comic has been the subject of both critical reviews and scholarly analysis. Reviewers have generally responded favorably to Zulli's artwork but have differed in their assessments of Gaiman's story.

== Publication history ==
The collaboration between Cooper and Gaiman was initiated by Bob Pfeifer, an executive at Epic Records. Gaiman participated in several songwriting sessions and helped develop the album's storyline. Epic planned to use the comic series to promote the album, with subsequent issues extending the record's publicity campaign.

Comics scholar Julia Round described the development of the project as a collaborative exchange between Gaiman, Cooper and Zulli. Cooper recalled preparing possible song titles and developing musical ideas during their discussions about the story.

Cooper had initially considered other media for the project. In an August 1994 interview with The Washington Post, he explained that difficulties in developing a virtual reality game, together with his dissatisfaction with the presentation of rock music on television, had led him to suggest a comic book instead.

The comic inaugurated Marvel Music, a short-lived publishing imprint established by editor Mort Todd. The original issues were printed in color. The first issue was included free of charge with a special edition of Cooper's album, and Marvel subsequently gathered all three issues into a single volume in 1995.

In a 1994 interview with Billboard, Cooper identified Ray Bradbury's novel Something Wicked This Way Comes as an influence on the project. He intended Steven and the Showman to represent contrasting aspects of his artistic persona. Gaiman, meanwhile, distinguished Cooper's private identity from the fictional figure he portrayed on stage, regarding the latter as comparable to established horror characters such as Dracula and Freddy Krueger. Gaiman also acknowledged the influence of Cooper's stage performances and Bradbury's depictions of sinister carnivals.

Dark Horse Comics issued a new collected edition in 2000. Its cream-colored pages and sepia illustrations gave the work a different visual character from that of the original Marvel publication. Round considered this presentation particularly effective in conveying an atmosphere of menace.

A Polish translation by Paulina Braiter was published by Egmont Polska in March 2006.

In October 2014, Dynamite Entertainment published a hardcover edition commemorating the comic's twentieth anniversary. It restored the color artwork and included preparatory drawings, Gaiman's original outline and scripts, and correspondence between Gaiman and Cooper. The edition also contained a foreword by Gaiman and a new afterword by Zulli.

== Plot ==
In a small American town, a boy named Steven struggles with his fears about adolescence and adulthood. Shortly before Halloween, his friends challenge him to visit a peculiar theater. Known as the Theatre of the Real, it is operated by an enigmatic figure called the Showman, who bears a resemblance to Alice Cooper. During his visit, Steven encounters supernatural performers and becomes attracted to Mercy, a girl working at the theater. The Showman wants Steven to join the establishment permanently, promising him a life free from everything that frightens him. In exchange, Steven would forfeit the possibility of becoming anything other than what he already is.

After leaving the theater, Steven finds that he cannot escape its proprietor, who manifests himself through people Steven knows. Investigating the theater's history, the boy learns of a fire that destroyed the Spaulding Memorial Theatre in 1884 and discovers a connection between the building and a series of disappearances of children at five-year intervals. Steven returns to challenge the Showman and destroys the theater by setting it ablaze. However, the Showman subsequently appears in Steven's reflection, suggesting that the confrontation may not have ended.

== Themes and narrative techniques ==
=== Adolescence and temptation ===
The moral difficulties associated with entering adulthood are a central concern of the story. In an interview published by MusicRadar in 2022, Cooper compared the premise of the project to the biblical account of the temptation of Christ. He explained that he wanted to encourage adolescents to question the things society presented to them as desirable. In discussing his work with Gaiman on the comic, Cooper emphasized the contrast between the enticing appearance of the Showman's attractions and the corruption concealed beneath them. He viewed Steven's ultimate refusal of the Showman's offer as the decisive act of the story.

=== Representation of Alice Cooper ===
Although Cooper is not identified by name within the fictional narrative, the Showman shares several features of his stage appearance, including his top hat and distinctive eye makeup. Round argued that these recognizable attributes serve purposes beyond identifying the character with the musician. For example, when the Showman manifests himself through other inhabitants of the town, their faces acquire Cooper's characteristic makeup, providing a visual indication of his presence.

Round also discussed the comic in relation to the French theatrical tradition of the Grand Guignol and its intertextual references to Cooper's career. These include allusions to the album Hey Stoopid and the Showman's transformation into a snake, an animal associated with Cooper's stage act. Round regarded such references as integral to the comic's storytelling and its representation of Cooper as a performer.

The character of Steven originated in Cooper's musical work. He appeared on Welcome to My Nightmare (1975), in the song "Wind-Up Toy" from Hey Stoopid (1991), and again on Along Came a Spider (2008). Round observed that the narratives associated with these appearances do not readily fit into a single chronology. She suggested that the comic could retrospectively provide an explanation for Steven's condition in the earlier albums, with his encounter with the Showman preceding the experiences described in those recordings. Round presented this as one possible interpretation rather than an established continuity.

=== Artwork and narration ===
Zulli worked on Duo-shade paper, a material with chemically activated patterns that enabled him to introduce tonal effects into his drawings. Round considered the suggestive quality of the resulting illustrations appropriate to the story's supernatural subject matter.

Discussing the visual storytelling, Round contrasted the opening sequence, in which the boys walk along a street depicted from a consistent viewpoint, with the beginning of the third issue, where abrupt changes of perspective interrupt the continuity of the action. She interpreted this contrast as a means of unsettling the reader as the Showman undermines the stability of Steven's world. Zulli identified Wes Craven's A Nightmare on Elm Street as one of his artistic influences.

Round also examined the relationship between the comic's verbal and visual narratives. Readers sometimes witness events through Steven's eyes, seeing supernatural phenomena that remain invisible to the other characters. The apparent objectivity of the illustrations is consequently called into question, weakening the distinction between Steven's perceptions and the external world.

Gaiman's prose introduction to the collected edition also became a subject of Round's analysis. It places the reader in a wax museum, where a statue representing Gaiman recounts the circumstances surrounding the comic's creation. Round interpreted this fictional framing of an autobiographical account as a form of metafiction, comparing it with Gaiman's treatment of historical and literary material in The Sandman.

== Reception ==
In August 1994, Joe Brown of The Washington Post responded favorably to the combination of the album and the comic, describing reading the latter while listening to the former as a complementary experience. Brown also praised Zulli's artwork and found the story engaging.

Reviewing the Dark Horse edition in 2001, Publishers Weekly interpreted the theater as a warning against choosing an easy existence at the expense of personal growth. The reviewer also commended Zulli's ability to invest commonplace settings with menace through his artwork and its sepia palette.

Another review in Publishers Weekly, published in 2005, considered the work relatively minor within Gaiman's output but found merit in its combination of ideas familiar from A Nightmare on Elm Street and Bradbury's Something Wicked This Way Comes. The reviewer likened the Showman to a combination of Tomás de Torquemada and Willy Wonka. Zulli received particular credit for his depiction of Steven as a believable adolescent and for his rendering of Cooper's likeness.

Reviewing the Polish edition for the online magazine Esensja in April 2006, Tomasz Markiet regarded the comic as competently written entertainment that offered few departures from established horror conventions. He was particularly disappointed by the predictability of the conclusion. Markiet was more enthusiastic about Zulli's visual treatment of the story, singling out his combination of line drawing with screentone patterns. Despite his reservations, Markiet recommended the work to horror readers.

Wojciech Orliński, writing in the Polish newspaper Gazeta Wyborcza in March 2006, regarded the comic's message as relevant beyond the circumstances of its original publication. He interpreted Steven's experiences in terms of the ethical decisions confronting a young person as they enter adulthood, particularly the choice between material rewards obtained dishonestly and a more demanding but principled existence. Orliński praised the story's recognition of the courage required to make such choices and noted that its title was ironic, since the need to resist temptation does not end with any single decision.

Assessing the twentieth-anniversary edition for Starburst, Ed Fortune found Gaiman's treatment of the supernatural premise unremarkable. He was considerably more impressed by Zulli's contribution, particularly the artist's ability to establish a melancholy, dreamlike setting. Fortune considered the additional material in the collected edition interesting but ultimately regarded the publication as more suitable for completists than for general readers.

In 2010, Julia Round published a comparative analysis of The Last Temptation and From the Inside (1979), an earlier Marvel comic featuring Alice Cooper and based on his album of the same name, in the Journal of Graphic Novels and Comics. Round argued that the earlier comic had largely assimilated Cooper into the existing conventions of superhero comics, whereas Gaiman and Zulli had made Cooper's theatrical identity a defining feature of their work. She concluded that the later comic demonstrated the medium's potential for representing celebrity personas whose identities depended on performance and the audience's participation.

== Sources ==
- Round, Julia (2010). "Reconstructing Alice Cooper: 'From the Inside' to The Last Temptation". Journal of Graphic Novels and Comics. 1 (2): 151–169. doi:10.1080/21504857.2010.528640.
