= It's Me =

It's Me may refer to:

- "It's Me" (Alice Cooper song), 1994
- It's Me (album), a 2003 album by Abbey Lincoln
- It's Me (EP), a 2016 EP by South Korean singer Hyolyn
- "It's Me (Pick Me)", a 2017 song by contestants of Produce 101 season 2
- "It's Me" (Illit song), 2026
- "It's Me", a song by Sara Groves from the 2009 album Fireflies and Songs
- It's I/It's me grammar
