= Hoodlum Thunder =

Studio album by Zodiac Mindwarp and the Love Reaction
- Released: January 20, 1991
- Genres: Hard rock; Sleaze rock
- Length: 40:44
- Label: Musidisc SA
- Producers: Ian Richardson and Nick Coler

Zodiac Mindwarp and the Love Reaction chronology
| Tattooed Beat Messiah (1988) | Hoodlum Thunder (1991) | My Life Story (1993) |

Singles from Hoodlum Thunder
- 1. "Elvis Died for You" / "TV Brain" Released: 1991; 2. "Meanstreak" / "Trash Madonna" Released: 1992; 3. "Feed My Frankenstein" Released: 1992 (promo)

Professional ratings
Review scores
| Source | Rating |
|---|---|
| Rock Hard | 8.5/10 |

Hoodlum Thunder is a 1991 album and the second full-length studio album released by Zodiac Mindwarp and the Love Reaction. It was recorded at Lille Yard Studios in London, England. The album was supported by singles for "Elvis Died For You" and "Meanstreak". "Feed My Frankenstein" was also recorded by Zodiac's influence, Alice Cooper, and released on his 1991 Hey Stoopid album. It was featured in the 1992 movie Wayne's World.

The band had been dumped by Phonogram, owing them nearly a million pounds, though not before recording a couple of demos. The first included "Elvis Died for You," "TV Brain" and the unreleased "Desolation Boulevard" (all co-written with Coler & Richardson). A five-song demo included the tracks "Private Hell" (two versions), "Trash Madonna," "Tomorrow Belongs to the Love Reaction," and "Airline Highway." Signing with Musidisc saw the band take a left-turn into musical oblivion. Zodiac recalled, "To be honest, they were the only ones who would have the album! They're like the South America of the record industry... We got turned down by literally every record label in the world".

== Track listing ==
=== Side one ===
1. "Elvis Died for You" (3:47) – (Coler, Manning, Richardson)
2. "Tomorrow Belongs to the Love Reaction" (4:06) – (Bird, Manning)
3. "Feed My Frankenstein" (4:07) – (Coler, Manning, Richardson)
4. "Trash Madonna" (3:47) – (Manning)
5. "Airline Highway" (3:52) – (Manning)

=== Side two ===
1. "Chainsaw" (4:14) – (Bird, Manning)
2. "President of the United States of Love" (3:23) – (Bird, Manning)
3. "Dr. Jekyl & Me" (3:59) – (Coler, Manning, Richardson)
4. "Hoodlum Thunder" (4:09) – (Bird, Manning)
5. "Meanstreak" (5:20) – (Manning)

== B-sides ==
1. "TV Brain" (3:34) – (Coler, Manning, Richardson)
2. "Elvis Died for You" (Mike Stone Mix) (5:43) – (Coler, Manning, Richardson)
3. "Don't Do Anything Illegal" (4:35) – (Bird, Landrum, Levy, Manning, Matt)
4. "Meanstreak" (Radio Version) (3:49) – (Manning)
5. "Force of Nature" (6:22) – (Bird, Levy)

== Personnel ==
- Slam Thunderhide (Stephen Landrum) – drums
- Cobalt Stargazer (Geoff Bird) – guitars
- Suzy X – bass
- Zodiac Mindwarp (Mark Manning) – vocals

== Notes ==
- https://www.loudersound.com/features/flash-metal-suicide-zodiac-mindwarp-and-the-love-reaction-hoodlum-thunder
- https://www.ultimate-guitar.com/articles/features/friday_top_25_best_songs_with_guitar_duels-49087
