= Arena rock =

Genre of rock music designed for large audiences

- Other names: Stadium rock; corporate rock; pomp rock
- Stylistic origins: Hard rock; pop rock; heavy metal
- Cultural origins: 1960s to mid-1970s

Other topics
- Progressive rock; glam rock; power pop; glam metal; pop metal

Arena rock (also known as stadium rock, pomp rock or corporate rock) (Note: At least some authors differentiate the terms slightly, Malcolm Dome of Classic Rock, for example, calling pomp rock "the child disowned by prog and orphaned by AOR".) is a style of rock music that became mainstream in the 1970s. It typically involves radio-friendly rock music that was designed to be played for large audiences.

As hard rock and pop rock became increasingly popular, groups began creating material inherently designed for performance to crowds and major concerts. Arena rock also developed from their use of more commercially oriented sounds that were intended for radio play. The highly produced music, including both upbeat, dramatic songs and slower power ballads, features strong emphasis on melody and frequently employs anthemic choruses. Other major characteristics include prominent guitar effects and the use of keyboard instruments. Typical themes of arena rock lyrics include love, heartbreak, angst, and sentimentality.

Many of the above labels are used pejoratively, and discussions over music criticism often delve into the question of whether musicians' focus on rock spectacle and mass appeal results in compromised artistic merit, particularly in terms of the difference between the interests of the "middlebrow" populace versus other listeners. Interest in arena rock is stereotypically associated with working-class to middle-class men living in either Canada or the United States (including so-called "yuppies"), which has been cited as the basis for condescending prejudice over social status in some criticisms. However, the style of music has been highly successful worldwide, particularly in terms of touring.

== Characteristics ==
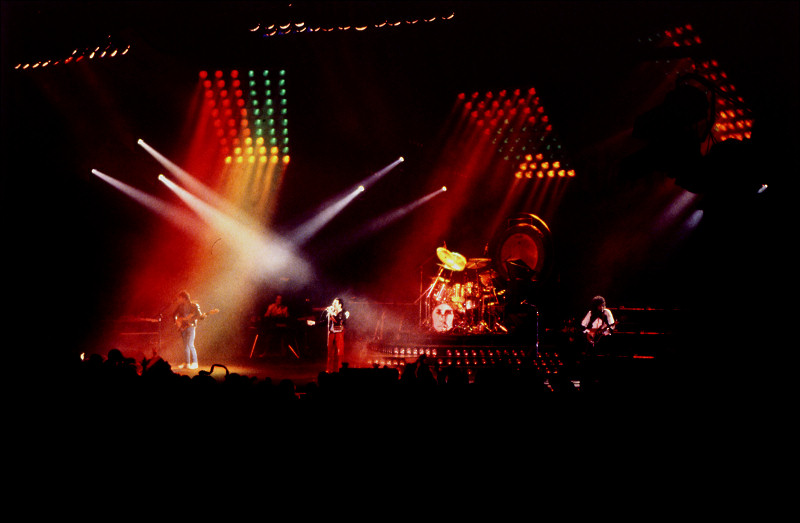
This Queen concert in Drammen, Norway, in April 1982 shows the scale and lighting of an arena rock concert, emphasis being on the performed spectacle.

Historian Gary A. Donaldson has summed up arena rock as "big hair, big voices, and really big guitars". In contrast to other types of music with a more raw, time-worn approach, arena rock musicians emphasize dramatic production. With bands deliberately designing their material for large audiences, the songs focus on melody, often featuring strident choruses. Guitar effects and the use of keyboard instruments are significant elements of the genre. Fireworks displays, use of smoke, and methods of sophisticated lighting, became part of the visual aesthetics of what is known as arena rock.

== Development and popularity ==
=== 1960s–1970s ===
Despite the differences in terms of genre, Beatlemania and the gigantic, screaming crowds that greeted the Beatles as they performed in the U.S. proved influential on arena rock, particularly with artists' complex views of the connection between themselves as musicians and the primal needs of their mass audiences. The rise of the rock style largely signified the end of the hippie-type of idealistic 1960s culture, particularly after the disillusionment that followed the infamous Altamont Free Concert of 1969, and represented a newer form of musical expression that was still confident and strident while also being more commercial. With hundreds of people injured and one dying, said concert has been described as "the spiritual death of the decade".

In the period from the end of the 1960s to the middle of the 1970s, advances in technology allowed for the increased power of amplification and sound systems without losing sound quality, thus giving hard rock bands the opportunity to use larger and larger venues. Attributing the birth of arena rock to the Rolling Stones' 1969 US tour, The Guardian ranked the tour number 19 on their list of the 50 key events in rock music history. Prior to the tour, the loudest sound at big-capacity shows was often the crowd, so the Stones ensured they had lighting and sound systems that would allow them to be seen and heard in the biggest arenas, with The Guardian stating their "combination of front-of-house excellence and behind the scenes savvy took the business of touring to an entirely new level."

Grand Funk Railroad, which advertised itself as a "people's band" on the release of their 1969 debut album given their nationwide touring, played to about 125,000 in Georgia and 180,000 in Texas within a short period of time. Although hard rock influenced heavy metal music and the arena rock style, they shared an emphasis on loudness and heavy sound that had dominated the rock mainstream from the late 1970s to the early 1980s.

Singer Steve Perry of Journey became one of the faces of arena rock in the late 1970s and early 1980s.

Bands such as Styx, Foreigner, Journey, REO Speedwagon, Boston, Toto, Kansas, and Night Ranger were popular arena rock acts of the late 1970s and early 1980s.

Arena rock's popularity, being described as "a dominant force" musically from the 1970s onward, resulted in a number of musical reactions. The British pub rock movement arose in large part due to its emphasis on small-scale events, aimed at promoting a friendly, intimate connection between performers and audiences. The explosion of punk rock and punk subcultures in general in the 1970s directly challenged the perceived excesses of mainstream rock at the time.

The music of the 1970s often reflected changing philosophical interests compared to previous decades, with personal growth, private revelation, and self-improvement gaining more emphasis compared to past interests in collectivist social activism. The period coming to be known dismissively as the "Me Decade", rock releases frequently celebrated a hedonistic, self-indulgent abandonment. Multiple artists also pursued an arena rock sound based on individual inspiration and achievement, particularly in anthemic songs about independence. In terms of the changing trends into the 1980s and onward, the style essentially replaced disco in terms of mass pop culture appeal.

=== 1980s–1990s ===
The Rock and Roll Hall of Fame states that the following decade, particularly the late 1980s, is "considered a golden era of hard rock in terms of commercial airplay".

During the 1980s, arena rock evolved in a way that was performance-driven yet far more aggressive and confrontational. Mainstream rock became dominated by these hair metal (also known as "glam metal" and "pop metal") bands, with a large emphasis still being put on both on music and visuals. Flashy clothing with elements such as heavy makeup and dramatic hairstyles became common. Prominent examples of this genre include Def Leppard, Mötley Crüe and Poison. Their popularity crashed after the success of alternative rock and grunge bands who began to break through into popular consciousness with an even more abrasive sound, particularly artists influenced by the success of Nirvana in the early 1990s.

The website AllMusic has opined that "old-fashioned hard rock became a scarce commodity in the post-alternative rock era; after grunge, many guitar bands not only adopted a self-consciously serious attitude, but also resisted the urge to write fist-pumping, arena-ready choruses." Multiple artists have continued to play on to cult followings. Bands Bon Jovi and Van Halen in particular achieved significant commercial success into the 1990s. (Note: One example of a direct continuity of sound between groups is how, in 1988, the band Aerosmith gave the outfit Guns N' Roses (GnR) a touring opportunity for the latter's first major set of performances, with GnR guitarist Slash adapting and expanding their mutual, arena-friendly style. The Rock and Roll Hall of Fame has remarked that the nine-minute-long GnR single "November Rain" and its related music video "solidified the band as a group of musicians capable of lavish arena-rock level productions both on and off the stage". The band notably performed the song at the 1992 MTV Video Music Awards alongside Elton John, a musician who rose to prominence in the arena rock movement back in the 1970s.) Later in the '90s and 2000s, post-grunge acts such as Creed and Nickelback released their own successful arena rock anthems.

== Critical perspectives ==
Ethnomusicologist Chris McDonald of Cape Breton University has argued that the label of a musical artist as "arena rock" and "old wave", done by music critics dismissively, originates from a background of classism influenced by modernism. Thus, mass popularity is put forth as an argument against perceived artistic merit, through the eyes of critics focused on high culture while disdaining market forces, particularly given the white, working class to middle class makeup of the fans. Focusing on the Canadian trio Rush, McDonald stated that the panning of the group as "dazzling yet empty" due to the musicians' focus on rock spectacle is a consequence of critics' psychological distance from the "middlebrow" populace that listens to them.

The use of commercial sponsorship for the large-scale tours and concerts of the 1970s, a practice that continues, has caused the music to pick up the pejorative label of being "corporate rock". Writer Chris Smith argued that the style dehumanized listeners, setting them up as passive recipients rather than allowing them to truly engage with musicians, and additionally put different bands in a position akin to homogenized products. It has also been regarded as capitalist propaganda. The distance between taste-makers' judgment of certain groups as "uncool" and their mass audience appeal had existed since the style's origins after the ending of the 1960s, and a wide variety of other dismissive terms have been used such as "dad rock". (Note: The term "dad rock" was invented by the Pitchfork music critic Rob Mitchum in his unhappy review of the album Sky Blue Sky by Wilco (2007). He later became opposed to the term.)

Deliberately playing against criticism and claiming to represent the people against the elite has been used in musical marketing. The association of arena rock with the so-called "yuppies" and their conspicuous consumption additionally has tied the style with a group often maligned in the media, subject to mocking caricatures and other kinds of ridicule. However, as pointed out by historian Gary A. Donaldson, the music eclipsed the waning genre of disco and related bands successfully toured across the world.

== See also ==
- 1970s in music
- List of rock genres
