= Wind-up toy (disambiguation) =

A wind-up toy is a toy powered by a clockwork motor.

It can also refer to:

- Wind-up doll joke, a type of joke that imagines a celebrity as a wind-up toy
- Wind Up Toys (album), a 2007 album by Capdown
- Wind-Up Toy (song), a 1991 song by Alice Cooper
