= The Four Horsemen (band) =

American rock band

- Origin: Hollywood, California, U.S.
- Genres: Hard rock, blues rock
- Years active: 1989–1996
- Labels: Caroline/ILL, Def American, Magnetic Air
- Past members: Haggis; Dave Lizmi; Frank C. Starr; Ben Pape; Ken "Dimwit" Montgomery; Ron Young; Pharaoh Barrett; Mike Lavoie; Chuck Biscuits; Randy Cooke; Mike Valentine; Tim Beattie; Victor Murgatroyd
- Website: www.thefourhorsemen.com

The Four Horsemen were an American hard rock band who enjoyed brief popularity in the late 1980s and early 1990s. Their style was blues-influenced hard rock, but their fame was both fleeting and marred by tragedy.

== History ==
The Four Horsemen were formed in the late 1980s by the Welsh-born guitarist Stephen Harris (a.k.a. Kid Chaos a.k.a. "Haggis"), who had been a member of Zodiac Mindwarp and a touring bassist for The Cult. Haggis formed the band in Hollywood, California, when he decided to leave The Cult, switching from bass to rhythm guitar. He had previously worked with Rick Rubin, the producer of the Electric album for the Cult, who introduced Haggis to the vocalist Frank Starr. Rubin also suggested the drummer Ken "Dimwit" Montgomery to Haggis. Dimwit was the brother of Charles Montgomery, aka Chuck Biscuits, then drummer with Danzig who were also working with Rubin.

Their first release was a self-titled four track EP in 1989, which was influenced by the sound of AC/DC and early Status Quo.

Their debut album, Nobody Said it Was Easy, produced by Rubin, was released in 1991, following a two-year delay when Starr was arrested on drug charges and spent six months in jail. The album generated the title track as a single, followed by the hit "Rockin' Is Ma' Business". However, Starr was arrested again and this time spent a year in jail on a drugs charge. This, combined with poor album sales as the grunge scene started to take over from traditional rock, caused the record label to drop them in 1992.

In 1994, the band, minus Haggis and Pape who had quit having had enough of Starr's behaviour, reconciled their differences and started to put together a third release which was to become Gettin' Pretty Good... at Barely Gettin' By. But the first of two tragedies struck on September 27, 1994, when their original drummer, Ken Montgomery, died of a drug overdose. The band continued with production of the album, dedicating it to Montgomery and with Chuck Biscuits taking over on drums for the album's completion.

In November 1995, Starr was hit by a drunk driver, while driving his motorcycle down Sunset Strip. Starr suffered a severe head injury which left him in a coma. Dave Lizmi carried on with the band as the sole remaining original member, releasing Gettin' Pretty Good... at Barely Gettin' By in 1996 on the Magnetic Air label, and embarking on a tour with vocalist Ron Young, formerly of Little Caesar, replacing Starr. Though it was initially hoped that Starr would recover, he eventually died on June 18, 1999. Following Starr's death, the band broke up.

In 2005, Haggis and Lizmi assembled as much archive footage of the band as they could gather, and released a two disc retrospective, Left for Dead. Disc one was a DVD featuring all videos from the Nobody Said it Was Easy CD, plus rare interviews, live performances, and behind the scenes footage. Disc two was a live album.

The song, "Back In Business Again", from their Gettin' Pretty Good... at Barely Gettin' By album, was featured in the G.I. Joe: Retaliation soundtrack.

== Line-up ==
Original members (1989):

- Frank C. Starr (vocals) (deceased)
- Dave Lizmi (lead/rhythm guitar)
- Haggis (rhythm guitar)
- Ben Pape (bass guitar)
- Ken "Dimwit" Montgomery (drums) (deceased)

Other players:

- Ron Young (vocals)
- Tim Beattie (vocals)
- Mike Valentine (lead guitar)
- Pharaoh Barrett (bass guitar)
- Chuck Biscuits (drums)
- Randy Cooke (drums)
- Mike Lavoie (guitar)
- Rick McGee (guitar)
- Derek Young (bass guitar)
- Victor Murgatroyd (bass guitar, 1987-1988)

== Discography ==
=== Studio albums ===
- Nobody Said it Was Easy (1991) – Def American
- Gettin' Pretty Good... at Barely Gettin' By (1996) – Magnetic Air
- Daylight Again (2009)

=== EP releases ===
- The Four Horsemen (EP) (1989) – Caroline/Ill Labels
- Welfare Boogie (EP) (2009) – Ill Labels - Remaster of the 1989 debut EP with 5 demos added on

=== Live album ===
- Death Before Suckass: The Four Horsemen Live at Saratoga Winners (2012)

=== Compilation album ===
- Left For Dead (CD+DVD Box set) (2005) – self-released

=== Singles ===
Year	Song	U.S. Mainstream Rock
1991	"Nobody Said it Was Easy"	16
1991	"Rockin Is Ma Business"	38
1992	"Tired Wings"	27
