= High Priest of Love =

EP by Zodiac Mindwarp and the Love Reaction
- Released: July 25, 1986
- Length: 17:14
- Labels: Food (UK), Vertigo (Canada)
- Producer: David Balfe

Zodiac Mindwarp and the Love Reaction chronology
High Priest of Love (1986)	Tattooed Beat Messiah (1988)

High Priest of Love is a 1986 EP and second studio release by Zodiac Mindwarp and the Love Reaction. This EP was released soon after Zodiac had signed with Phonogram Records. A video for the title track, directed by Andy Lee, was issued during the summer compiling live footage of the band. The band secured an opening slot for Motörhead to support the release. The title track was included on the Return of the Living Dead Part II movie soundtrack in 1988, and was also covered in 1990 by British neo-Nazi band No Remorse on their album Blood Against Gold.

== Critical reception ==
Professional ratings
Review scores
Source	Rating
Sounds	4/5 stars

Donald McRae of New Musical Express named band as "competent crud" and an album as "ridiculously mannered, mildly funny and ultimately useless piece of rock product". Sounds reacted in an opposite way. Jack Barron was impressed by Mindwarp's "wicked wit". He described music as "six-legged riff monster so cliched it makes your aesthetic ears blush, yet so crude it crushes your ribs with equal doses of cartoon humour and occasional flashes of raw power". Reviewer summarized: "And with the scathing tongue of a Lydon, the speed-scorched larynx of a Lemmy and the deep throat of a Beefheart, all Zodiac wants to do is put his love gun in your mouth and blow your head off. Your finger is on his trigger". As a result, in the end of the year Sounds writers included EP into their list of the most important, influential and significant albums of 1986 with recognition that "Zodiac, the delinquent genius whose poetic prose and codpiece colossus thrilled the girlies and chilled the guys; Slam, the garbage man who thinks he's the new messiah on drums; Cobalt, a guitarist who quit Wham! when they introduced minor chords, dismissing them as poofs; and Kid, a teenage Dennis the Menace with spunk stains up his AC/DC T-shirt". "1986 was their year and no one else's".

== Track listing ==
All tracks are written by Mark Manning.

Side A
No.	Title	Length
1.	"High Priest of Love"	3:16
2.	"Hymn of the Speed Kings"	2:15
3.	"High Heel Heaven"	2:56

Side B
No.	Title	Length
1.	"Dangerous"	3:05
2.	"Kick Start Me for Love"	2:36
3.	"Wild Child (Second Attempt)"	3:06
Total length:		17:14

== Credits ==
Zodiac Mindwarp and The Love Reaction

- Zodiac Mindwarp – Vocals
- Cobalt Stargazer – Guitars
- Kid Chaos – Bass
- Slam Thunderhide – Drums

Production

- David Balfe – producer
