= No Remorse (band) =

English band

- Origin: London, England
- Genres: White power rock; oi!
- Years active: 1985–1996 (Burnley); 1996-unknown (Browning)
- Labels: Rebelles Européens; Rock-O-Rama Records; Nordland Records; Resistance Records
- Past members: Nigel Brown; Paul Burnley

No Remorse are an English white power rock band formed in London in 1985. They were one of the most prominent neo-Nazi skinheads bands of the Rock Against Communism scene. The band was led by Paul Burnley between 1986 and 1996, and by William Browning and Daniel "Jacko" Jack from 1996 onwards, following a factional dispute within British white nationalist politics.

== History ==
The first iteration of No Remorse formed in 1985, and comprised Mark Vince (guitar), Stewart Baile (drums), Paul (bass), and Jason (vocals); this line-up disbanded without having made any performances.

The band reformed in November 1986, after Vince met Paul Burnley (real name Paul Bellany) at a Skrewdriver concert in Surrey in October 1986. The son of Scottish painter John Bellany, Burnley had previously fronted the Oi! band Public Enemy before being fired due to political differences, and was also editor of white power skinhead fanzine The Truth at Last. With Burnley as vocalist, Vince and Baile reprised their roles as guitarist and drummer respectively, and the new line-up was completed by a Northern Irish bassist called Archie.

In 1987, No Remorse were closely involved in the founding of Ian Stuart Donaldson's neo-Nazi music organisation Blood & Honour. Paul Burnley was interviewed in the first issue of Blood & Honour magazine and in that interview called Adolf Hitler "the greatest man in history". Blood and Honour also advertised No Remorse merchandise, including a t-shirt that read "One day the world will know Adolf Hitler was right".

The band's debut album, This Time The World, was released on French RAC label Rebelles Européens in 1988, its title a reference to American neo-Nazi George Lincoln Rockwell's autobiography. The lyrics featured on the album are significantly more extreme and unabashed in their racism and calls to violence than precedents in the Rock Against Communism genre. The final track, for example, celebrates white nationalist terrorist Robert Mathews, while "Six Million Lies", another song from the album, denies the Holocaust, and "Bloodsucker" proclaims that "one day the world will realise Adolf Hitler was right". The album's cover, designed by Nicky Crane, prominently features a Celtic cross and SS insignia, while the rear of the sleeve is a picture of white children Nazi saluting over a flag featuring the Celtic cross.

The band switched label from Rebelles Européens to Rock-O-Rama Records in 1988, and released two albums through Rock-O-Rama subsidiary RAC Records in 1989—See You in Valhalla and The New Stormtroopers. RAC Records also released the band's fourth album, Blood Against Gold, in 1990, which included a cover of Zodiac Mindwarp and the Love Reaction's "High Priest of Love". During this period, Rob Emes was the band's drummer and Gary Smith had assumed bass duties. In 1990, No Remorse also played their first North American shows, performing at Canadian Aryan Fest in Metcalfe, Ottawa and at Tom Metzger's third annual Aryan Fest in rural Oklahoma. In 1991, Will Browning joined the band as second guitarist, and in 1992, Australian musician Nigel Brown (formerly of RAC band White Lightning) joined the band as their bassist.

In 1992 they accompanied the Swedish RAC band Dirlewanger at a festival in Brandenburg, Germany. In September they travelled to California, USA with Dirlewanger, where they performed together and recorded the album Desert Storm. The band recorded Farewell Ian Stuart in April 1994, and they signed for to Movement Records and Nordland Records. They recorded the album Under The Gods for Nordland Records, and Movement Records released Skinhead Army. Later that year, they performed at A Tribute to Ian Stuart in Racine, Wisconsin, USA accompanied by Bound for Glory, Centurion, RaHoWa and Berserkr. Following the concert, Joe Rowan, singer of Nordic Thunder, was murdered at a gas station.

In 1995, Nordland Records released Under The Gods, and Resistance Records released The Best of No Remorse. Movement Records encountered economic troubles and sold the rights to European Skinhead Army to Nordland. The Winning Hand (the renamed version of European Skinhead Army) was released in 1996.

In 1996, Will Browning, who had previously played guitar in No Remorse, wrested control of the band from Paul Burnley. This followed a tussle for control of Blood and Honour between Burnley, who edited the organisation's magazine, and Combat 18 members led by Browning and Charlie Sargent. Browning selected Daniel Jack ("Jacko") as the band's new vocalist, while ex-bassist Gary Smith rejoined the band; Chingford Attack drummer Jean-Charles Tanzi completed the new line-up.

This new iteration of No Remorse recorded Barbecue in Rostock in 1996, the album's title a reference to the 1992 Rostock-Lichtenhagen race riots where neo-Nazi rioters set fire to a hostel housing refugees. Barbecue in Rostock was more virulently racist and violent than Burnley's No Remorse and other earlier RAC bands, with ten out of the eleven songs on the album unabashedly encouraging violence against minority groups. Browning's label ISD Records, who had released the album, were forced to shift their address to Denmark to avoid prosecution in the UK, and in 1998, a British man was sentenced to six months' imprisonment for having manufactured Barbecue in Rostock CDs.

In 2006, Browning and Jon Denny-Mallen were charged with trying to incite racial hatred for allegedly attempting to import CD copies of the band's 2006 album Deutschland into Jersey from Poland. In November 2009 Denny-Mallen was acquitted by a jury at Southwark Crown Court, while the jury failed to reach a verdict in the case against Browning.

Browning's No Remorse continued to release albums into the 2000s, and have performed as recently as 2018.

== Discography ==
=== Burnley era ===
- This Time the World (1988)
- The New Stormtroopers (1989)
- See You in Valhalla (1989)
- Blood Against Gold (1990)
- The Best of No Remorse (1995) - contains re-recordings of tracks from the first four albums
- Under the Gods (1995)
- The Winning Hand (1995)

=== Post-Burnley era ===
- Barbecue in Rostock (1996)
- Oi! Monkey (2005)
- Start Up the Panzers (2005)
- Deutschland (2005)
- 18 Was Right (2012)
