= Kane Roberts (album) =

Studio album by Kane Roberts
- Released: 1987
- Genres: Hard rock, Glam metal
- Length: 39:42
- Label: MCA
- Producer: Michael Wagener

Kane Roberts chronology
Kane Roberts (1987)	Saints and Sinners (1991)

Singles from Kane Roberts
- 1. "Rock Doll" Released: 1987

Kane Roberts is the debut studio album by American rock musician Kane Roberts, released in 1987.

== Background ==
The album was recorded at Amigo Studios in Los Angeles, California.

== Music ==
The album's style is described as pop metal.

== Artwork ==
Simon Young of Metal Hammer wrote: "With a well-proportioned torso, Alice Cooper's former guitarist is seen here navigating a city in chaos, armed with a flame-throwing, machine gun-shaped guitar. This lad is getting home in time for his dinner, no question about that."

== Critical reception and legacy ==
Whitney Z. Gomes of AllMusic gave the album two and a half stars out of five, and wrote: "The Kane Roberts debut mostly demonstrates why poodle pop-metal must forever fight for props. Look, a listener can grow to like anything, but this is flat, corporate hair without the hits, so be careful how much you shell out for Kane Roberts." In 2023, Metal Hammer named the album as one of "the 50 most hilariously ugly rock and metal album covers ever."
