= Saints and Sinners (Kane Roberts album) =

Studio album by Kane Roberts
- Released: March 5, 1991
- Genres: Hard rock, glam metal
- Length: 45:19
- Label: Geffen
- Producer: Sir Arthur Payson

Kane Roberts chronology
Kane Roberts (1987)	Saints and Sinners (1991)	Under a Wild Sky (1999)

Singles from Saints and Sinners
- 1. "Twisted" Released: 1991; 2. "Does Anybody Really Fall in Love Anymore?" Released: 1991; 3. "Wild Nights" Released: 1992

Professional ratings
Review scores
Source	Rating
Allmusic	4.5/5 stars
Entertainment Weekly	B
Rock Hard	6/10

Saints and Sinners is the second studio album by Kane Roberts. It was produced by Sir Arthur Payson. Songwriter Desmond Child also has co-writing credits on all tracks.

"Twisted" was the album's first single. The accompanying video featured model and actress Tania Coleridge. The second single, "Does Anybody Really Fall in Love Anymore?", became a hit on radio and MTV, peaking at No. 38 on Billboard's Hot 100 chart. It was written by Child, Jon Bon Jovi, Richie Sambora, and Diane Warren, and was previously recorded by Cher for her 1989 album Heart of Stone.

== Track listing ==
Side One
No.	Title	Writer(s)	Length
1.	"Wild Nights"	Arthur Funaro, Steve Steele, Desmond Child, Kane Roberts	4:15
2.	"Twisted"	Diane Warren, Child, Roberts	4:04
3.	"Does Anybody Really Fall in Love Anymore?" (Cher cover)	Jon Bon Jovi, Richie Sambora, Warren, Child	4:28
4.	"Dance Little Sister"	Jack Ponti, Vic Pepe, Child, Roberts	3:35
5.	"Rebel Heart"	Funaro, Steele, Child, Roberts	5:49

Side Two
No.	Title	Writer(s)	Length
6.	"You Always Want It"	Steele, Child, Roberts	4:34
7.	"Fighter"	Child, Roberts	4:54
8.	"I'm Not Lookin' for an Angel"	John McCurry, Child, Roberts	5:29
9.	"Too Far Gone"	Funaro, Steele, Child, Roberts	4:01
10.	"It's Only Over for You"	Funaro, Child, Roberts	4:02

2012 Reissue Bonus Tracks
No.	Title	Writer(s)	Length
11.	"House Burning Down"	Roberts	3:09
12.	"Waiting for You"	Roberts	3:41
13.	"Dirty Blonde"	Roberts	3:01
14.	"White Trash"	Roberts	4:04

== Personnel ==
- Kane Roberts – vocals, lead and rhythm guitar
- John McCurry – guitar
- Chuck Kentis – keyboards
- Steve Steele – bass
- Myron Grombacher – drums
