= Wind-Up Toy (song) =

Song by Alice Cooper

from the album Hey Stoopid
- Language: English
- Released: 2 July 1991
- Recorded: Bearsville Studios, New York, USA
- Length: 5:27
- Label: Epic
- Songwriter(s): Alice Cooper, Vic Pepe, Jack Ponti, Bob Pfeifer
- Producer(s): Peter Collins

"Wind-Up Toy" is the twelfth and final track on Alice Cooper's nineteenth studio album Hey Stoopid (1991). Though the song was never released as a single (it does feature as the B-side to the "Hey Stoopid" single), the song is very popular among Cooper's fans, often favourite above all others by some. Guitar player Joe Satriani makes a guest appearance on the track.

== Relation to Steven ==
The track is the first confirmed appearance of fictional character/alter ego Steven in more than 15 years. In the song, we learn that he is imprisoned in a lunatic hospital and that his only friends are the insects, rats and his toys on the floor. This tells us that he still has the mind of a small child. Obviously it upset Steven to become an adult. The song possibly suggests something happened that forced him to be like an adult, before he was ready for it. It might be that his parents rejected him;

Daddy won't discuss me
What a state I must be
Mommy couldn't stand living with a wind-up toy

Steven feels that he never had the chance to be a young boy and that he grew up too fast. Because of this, he acts like a child and probably thinks that he still is one:

Preacher crucifies me
Warden wants to fry me
I was never young
Never just a little boy

It is also hinted that Steven still is haunted by the nightmare from Alice Cooper's 1975 album Welcome to My Nightmare, and possibly also the Curator from the album:

I'm lost in a nightmare

After the song ends, a little girl's voice can faintly be heard calling "Steven!"

== Personnel ==
- Alice Cooper – Vocals
- Mickey Curry – Drums
- Stef Burns – Guitar
- Hugh McDonald – Bass
- Joe Satriani – Guitar
