= Tattooed Beat Messiah =

Studio album by Zodiac Mindwarp & The Love Reaction
- Released: February 16, 1988
- Recorded: 1987
- Genres: Hard rock; Glam metal; Sleaze rock
- Length: 41:15
- Label: Vertigo
- Producers: Bill Drummond and David Balfe

Zodiac Mindwarp & The Love Reaction chronology
| High Priest of Love (EP) (1986) | Tattooed Beat Messiah (1988) | Hoodlum Thunder (1991) |

Singles from Tattooed Beat Messiah
- 1. "Prime Mover" / "Laughing In The Face Of Death" Released: 1987; 2. "Backseat Education" / "Whore Of Babylon" Released: 1987; 3. "Planet Girl" / "Dog Face Driver" Released: 1988

Professional ratings
Review scores
| Source | Rating |
|---|---|
| AllMusic | 3/5 stars |

Tattooed Beat Messiah is the 1988 debut full-length studio release by Zodiac Mindwarp and the Love Reaction. Engineered by Femi Jiya and Mark Freegard, and mixed by Nigel Green. The album reached #132 on the US Billboard 200 and #20 on the UK album charts in March 1988 supported by music videos for the "Prime Mover" (single, April 1987), "Backseat Education" (single, October 1987, UK #49), and "Planet Girl" (single, March 1988, UK #63). Tracks included on the album that had been released in 1987 were remixed for inclusion on the album. "Prime Mover" would be the band's most successful single reaching #18 on the UK singles charts in May 1987, well in advance of the eventual album release. The single also charted in New Zealand hitting #12.

The album was reissued in January 1998 as "The Best of Zodiac Mindwarp" including the "Born To Be Wild" track. Rock Candy Records issued a 24-bit remastered version of the album in August 2007 including the 9 tracks that had originally been used as singles B-sides.

== Contemporary reviews ==
In the May 1988 issue of Circus magazine, music critic Paul Gallotta enthusiastically reviewed the debut material, describing it as one of the most exciting, though not entirely original, British exports in recent years. The reviewer drew extensive stylistic comparisons, characterising the sonic approach as a hybrid of Motörhead, Slade, and Steppenwolf. Gallotta advised audiences to bypass the heavily hyped conceptual branding and focus instead on the core compositions, highlighting "Prime Mover," "Let's Break the Law," and the title track. The publication noted that the combination of gritty vocal deliveries, monumental hooks, and intense performances might prove too extreme for mainstream American listeners. Ultimately, the review concluded that the record established a crucial foundation for forward-thinking fans, predicting a major commercial breakthrough by the time of their next release.

== Track listing ==
All tracks composed by Mark Manning; except where indicated

=== Side one ===
1. "Wolf Child Speech" (0:30)
2. "Prime Mover" (3:13)
3. "Skull Spark Joker" (2:27)
4. "Backseat Education" (3:04)
5. "Hey Baby" (0:05)
6. "Bad Girl City" (3:00)
7. "Untamed Stare" (2:41)
8. "Tattooed Beat Messiah" (3:36)

=== Side two ===
1. "Born to Be Wild" (3:20) – (Mars Bonfire)
2. "Upside Down" (0:09)
3. "Let's Break the Law" (3:35)
4. "Spasm Gang" (2:44)
5. "Holy Gasoline" (4:14)
6. "Planet Girl" (2:37)
7. "Kids Stuff" (4:55)
8. "Messianic Reprise" (1:05)

== 2007 Rock Candy reissue bonus tracks ==
1. "Laughing in the Face of Death" (2:52) – Manning
2. "Hangover from Hell" (3:41) – Manning
3. "Mess With the Killer" (2:32) – Manning
4. "Whore of Babylon" (3:32) – Manning
5. "Lager Woman from Hell" (3:18) – Manning, Munro
6. "Messin' With My Best Friend's Girl" (3:25) – Manning
7. "Dog Face Driver" (2:03) – Manning
8. "Born to Be Wild" (3:20) – Bonfire
9. "Go Go Baby Dream Show" (3:18) – Manning

In some markets "Born To Be Wild" had originally only been available as a bonus track on the "Planet Girl" single. For the 2007 reissue it was integrated as one of the bonus tracks rather than appearing in the original track order. The B-sides were produced by Zodiac Mindwarp. Lead vocals on "Lager Woman from Hell" by Evil Bastard.

== Other B-sides ==
1. "Prime Mover" (Automatic Cannibal Mix) (4:42) – Manning – US "Prime Mover" 12" single (Vertigo/Mercury PRO 553-1).
2. "Planet Girl" (The Invader Mix) (4:27) - Manning – UK "Planet Girl" 12" single (Mercury/Phonogram ZOD-312).
3. "The Zodiac-Scream" (0:07) – Manning – German one-sided promo single (Mercury 888 675-7).

== Musicians ==
- Zodiac Mindwarp – vocals
- Cobalt Stargazer (Geoff Bird) – guitars
- Flash Bastard – guitars
- Trash D. Garbage – bass
- Slam Thunderhide (Stephen Landrum) – drums
