= The Last Temptation (Alice Cooper album) =

Studio album by Alice Cooper
- Released: July 12, 1994
- Genres: Hard rock; heavy metal
- Length: 50:48
- Label: Epic
- Producers: Don Fleming, Duane Baron, John Purdell, Andy Wallace

Alice Cooper chronology
Hey Stoopid (1991)	The Last Temptation (1994)	Classicks (1995)

Singles from The Last Temptation
- 1. "Lost in America" Released: May 1994; 2. "It's Me" Released: July 1994

Professional ratings
Review scores
Source	Rating
Allmusic	4/5 stars
Entertainment Weekly	B
Q	3/5 stars
Rolling Stone	3/5 stars

The Last Temptation is the thirteenth solo and twentieth studio album overall by American rock singer Alice Cooper, released on July 12, 1994, by Epic Records. It centers on a boy named Steven (also the protagonist of Cooper's earlier work, Welcome to My Nightmare), and a mysterious showman. The showman, with apparent supernatural abilities, attempts with the use of twisted versions of morality plays to persuade Steven to join his traveling show, "The Theater of the Real - The Grand-est Guignol!", where he would "never grow up".

The album once again features collaborations with some high-profile guests: Chris Cornell of Soundgarden co-wrote and sings on two songs, Dan Wexler of Phoenix metallers Icon co-wrote four songs including the single "Lost in America" where he also plays guitar, and Derek Sherinian of Dream Theater plays keyboards.

== Comic ==
The full storyline of the album was depicted in a three-part comic book (also called The Last Temptation) written by Neil Gaiman and drawn by Michael Zulli, the first part of which accompanied the recording. In the comic, the Showman (depicted as Cooper himself) attempts to entice the boy Steven to join his supernatural show. Pages from the comic are seen in the Lost in America music video.

It was originally published by Marvel Comics and later reprinted by Dark Horse Comics, collected as trade paperback.

== Video ==
Music videos were made for "Lost in America" and "It's Me". Both music videos are available for download from Sony/BMG.

== Reception ==
Barry Weber of allmusic.com wrote, "By the time The Last Temptation was released in 1994, the hair band fad that had fueled Cooper's return was dead, and Cooper was obviously aware of its downfall – the album sounds almost nothing like its two predecessors (1989's Trash and 1991's Hey Stoopid). Far surpassing anything Cooper recorded in almost 20 years, The Last Temptation is unquestionably some of his best work."

=== Live performances ===
Although Epic did not finance a tour and Cooper consequently did not tour The Last Temptation, four of the album's songs – "It's Me", "Lost in America", "Cleansed by Fire" and "Sideshow" – were incorporated into Cooper's setlist from the time of his first appearance on the Monsters of Rock circuit in September 1995. Although "It's Me" was dropped after four performances, the other three songs remained a regular part of setlists until the end of the Life and Crimes of Alice Cooper tour in 1999, and were joined by "Nothing's Free" on the "School's Out for Summer '97" tour. However, with the exception of "Lost in America", which has remained a frequent part of setlists excluding the first three quarters of the 2012 to 2015 "Raise the Dead" tour, nothing from The Last Temptation has been performed live from 2000 onwards.

== Track listing ==
No.	Title	Writer(s)	Length
1.	"Sideshow"	Alice Cooper, Brian Smith, Michael Brooks, Jon Norwood, Dan Wexler, Bud Saylor	6:39
2.	"Nothing's Free"	Cooper, Wexler, Saylor, Bob Pfeifer	5:01
3.	"Lost in America"	Cooper, Wexler, Pfeifer	3:54
4.	"Bad Place Alone"	Cooper, Wexler, Pfeifer	5:04
5.	"You're My Temptation"	Cooper, Jack Blades, Tommy Shaw	5:09
6.	"Stolen Prayer"	Chris Cornell, Cooper	5:37
7.	"Unholy War"	Cornell	4:10
8.	"Lullaby"	Cooper, Jim Vallance	4:28
9.	"It's Me"	Cooper, Blades, Shaw	4:39
10.	"Cleansed by Fire"	Cooper, Mark Hudson, Steve Dudas, Pfeifer	6:12

== Personnel ==
- Alice Cooper – lead vocals
- Stef Burns – guitars, backing vocals
- Greg Smith – bass, backing vocals
- Derek Sherinian – keyboards, backing vocals
- David Uosikkinen – drums

Additional personnel

- Chris Cornell – additional vocals on "Stolen Prayer" and "Unholy War"
- Dan Wexler – additional guitar on "Lost In America"
- John Purdell – additional keyboards on "You're My Temptation", "Lullaby" and "It's Me"
- Lou Merlino – backing vocals
- Mark Hudson – backing vocals
- Craig Copeland – backing vocals
- Brett Hudson – backing vocals

== Charts ==
Chart (1994)	Peak position
Australian Albums (ARIA)	15
Austrian Albums (Ö3 Austria)	24
Canada Top Albums/CDs (RPM)	70
Dutch Albums (Album Top 100)	73
Finnish Albums (Suomen virallinen lista)	7
German Albums (Offizielle Top 100)	18
Hungarian Albums (MAHASZ)	32
Norwegian Albums (VG-lista)	20
Scottish Albums (Official Charts)	37
Swedish Albums (Sverigetopplistan)	19
Swiss Albums (Schweizer Hitparade)	13
UK Albums (Official Charts)	6
US Billboard 200	68
