= Kane Roberts =

American rock musician (born 1962)

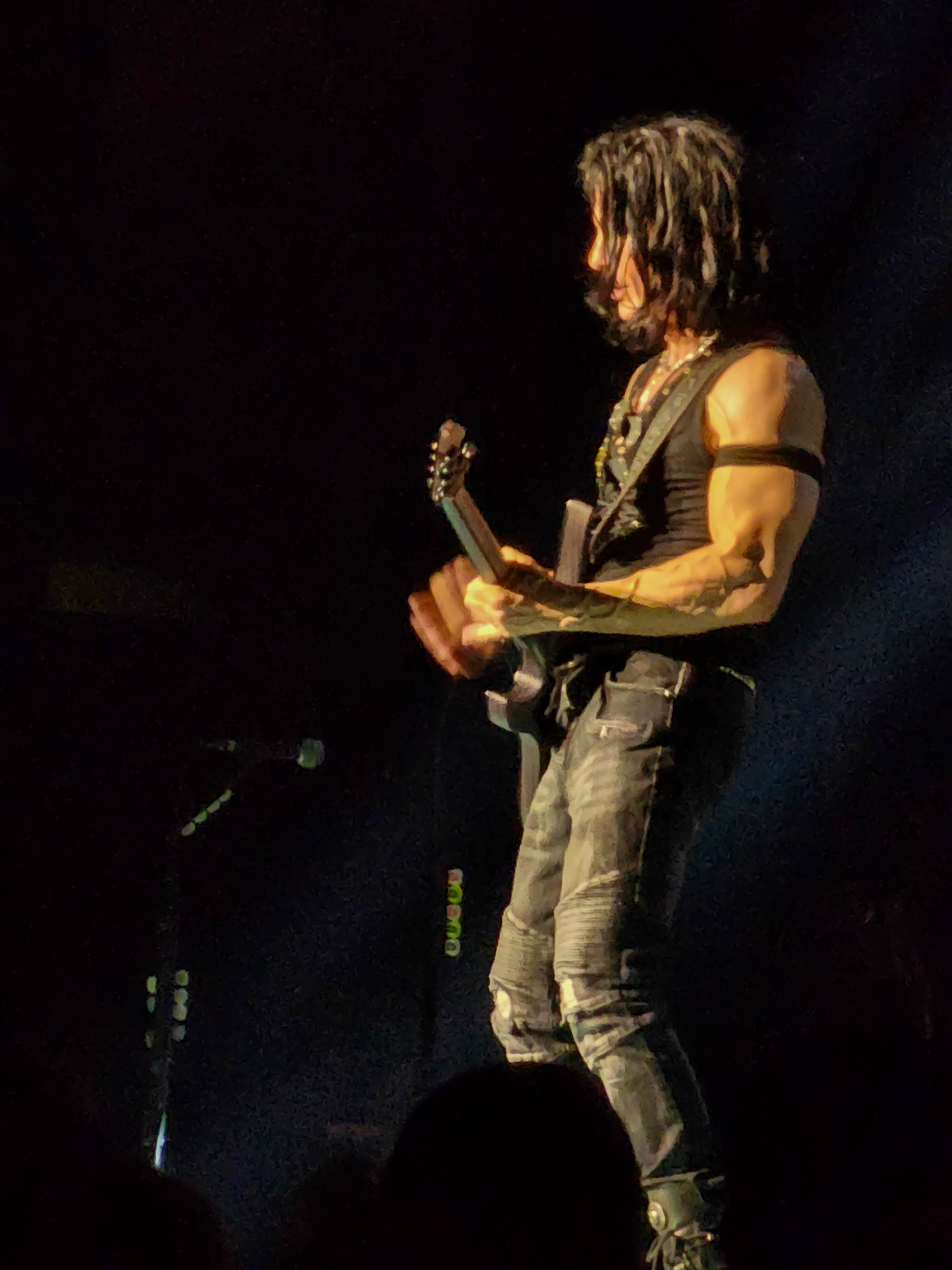
- Roberts in 2022

Background information
- Born: Robert William Athas; January 16, 1962 (age 64)
- Genres: Hard rock; glam metal; heavy metal
- Occupations: Musician; songwriter
- Instruments: Guitar; vocals
- Years active: 1985–present
- Formerly of: Alice Cooper; Phoenix Down

Kane Roberts (born Robert William Athas; January 16, 1962) is an American rock guitarist and singer best known as a former lead guitarist for Alice Cooper. Additionally, he has performed as a solo act, and his cover of the Bon Jovi song "Does Anybody Really Fall in Love Anymore?" cracked the Top 40 on the Billboard Hot 100. Roberts is notable for his Rambo-like appearance and physique and his usage of an electric guitar shaped like a machine gun.

== Career ==
Roberts was the guitarist who played on Alice Cooper's Constrictor and Raise Your Fist and Yell and their respective tours. He is the man responsible for Alice's metal years in the late 1980s, as he co-wrote nearly every track from those albums. Just by being on stage, he was a part of the show with his huge physique and rocket shooting guitars.

After Raise Your Fist and Yell, Roberts released his first solo album, Kane Roberts, which featured Cooper's lyrics on "Full Pull." He then guested on Cooper's 1989 Trash album, playing guitar on "Bed of Nails," which he co-wrote. Two years later, he released a second solo album, Saints and Sinners, which contained the Bon Jovi-penned "Does Anybody Really Fall in Love Anymore?", previously recorded by Cher as well.

While he is primarily a guitar player, Roberts is also a skilled vocalist, capable of extreme high range, as is evident on his solo projects. He has contributed backing vocals on several albums, including Steve Vai's Sex & Religion, Desmond Child's Discipline, and the song "Shocker" by the Dudes of Wrath, which served as the title track from the 1989 film of the same name.

His additional musical contributions include playing on the Bob Ezrin-produced Count Three & Pray album by Berlin, and the 1986 Rod Stewart album Every Beat of My Heart. He also co-wrote "Take It Off" with Paul Stanley and Bob Ezrin, which appeared on Kiss' Revenge album.

Roberts took a long hiatus from music after his second solo album, but returned in 1999 with a band called Phoenix Down, named for a life potion in the video game franchise Final Fantasy. Phoenix Down recorded one album, entitled Under A Wild Sky. Fans of both say that much of the record is inspired by the seventh game in the series, one of Roberts' favorite games.

After several years away from the music industry, working in graphic arts and as a video game programmer, Roberts began work on a new album, Touched, in 2006.

On October 23, 2011, Roberts performed with Talon at Firefest VIII, marking his first live performance in over 20 years. In 2012, Roberts released Unsung Radio, a collection of previously unreleased tracks. In 2016, Roberts featured on a track for the Northern Ireland-based hard rock outfit, Maverick. The track and video (also featuring Roberts) for "Asylum" also included Jakob Samuel from Sweden's The Poodles.

On January 25, 2019, Roberts released a new solo album, The New Normal, on Frontiers Records.

In July 2022, Alice Cooper announced that Roberts would rejoin his touring band for the late 2022 tour following the departure of Nita Strauss. This marks Roberts' first official stint in Cooper's band in over 30 years. On March 3, 2023, Alice Cooper announced that Nita Strauss would return for the 2023 tour.

== Discography ==
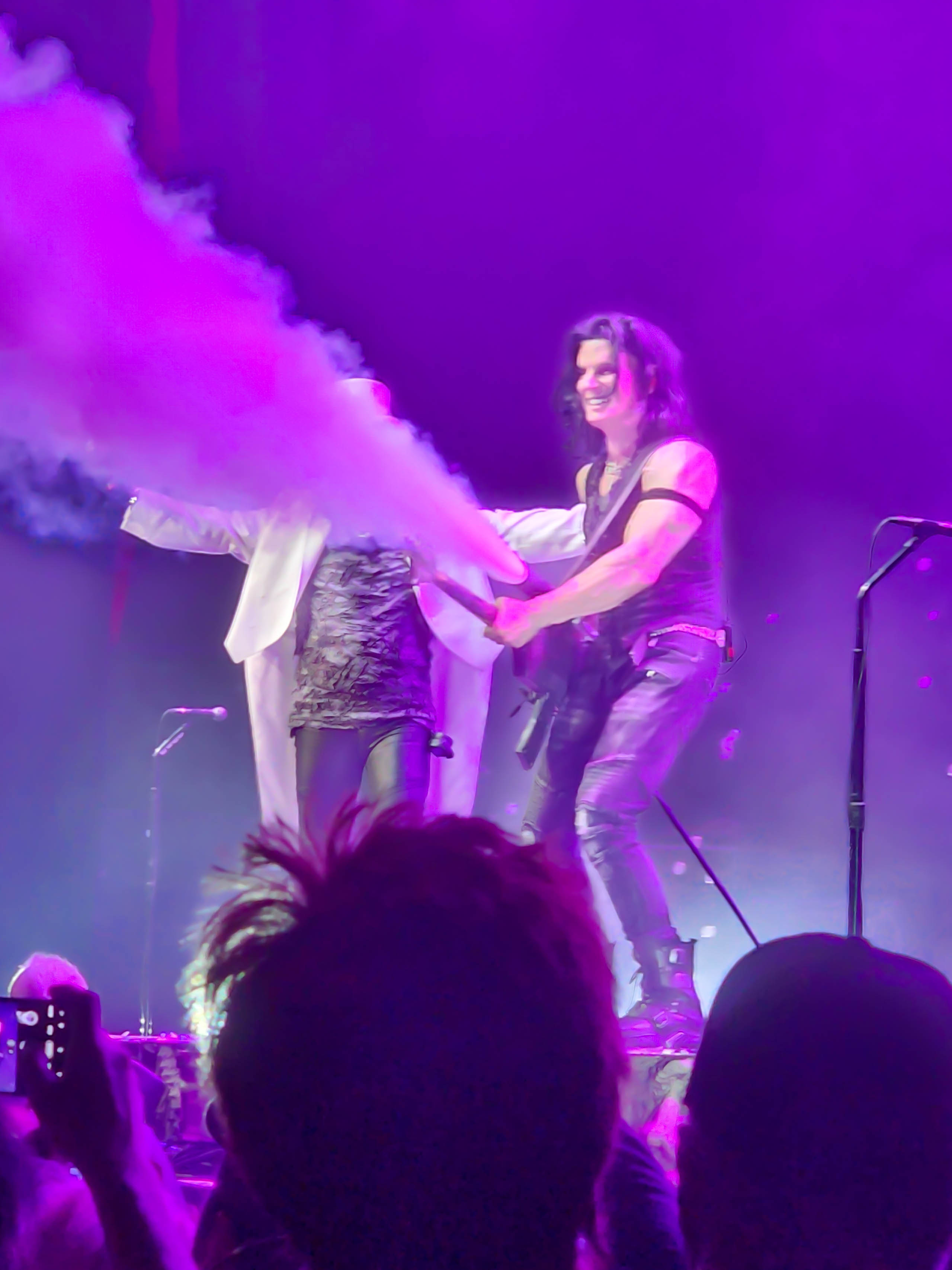
Roberts with Alice Cooper in 2022

=== Studio albums ===
- Kane Roberts (1987)
- Saints and Sinners (1991)
- Unsung Radio (2012)
- The New Normal (2019)

=== With Alice Cooper ===
- Constrictor (1986)
- Raise Your Fist and Yell (1987)
- Bed of Nails (1989)
- The track Dead Don't Dance on the album "Road" (2023)

=== With Phoenix Down ===
- Under a Wild Sky (1999)

=== Guest appearances ===
Title	Release	Contribution	Other artist(s)	Album
"Will I Ever Understand You"	1986	guitar	Berlin	Count Three & Pray
"Like Flames"	1986	guitar	Berlin	Count Three & Pray
"Bed of Nails"	1989	guitar	Alice Cooper	Trash
(several songs)	1991	backing vocals	SouthGang	Tainted Angel
"Love on a Rooftop"	1991	backing vocals	Desmond Child	Discipline
(several songs)	1993	backing vocals	Steve Vai	Sex & Religion
	2000	CD artwork and design	Alice Cooper	Brutal Planet
"Dead Don't Dance"	2023	guitar	Alice Cooper	Road

== See also ==
- The Lords of Tantrazz, a video game designed by Roberts
