= Discipline (Desmond Child album) =

Studio album by Desmond Child
- Released: June 18, 1991
- Recorded: 1990–1991
- Studios: The Village Recorder (Los Angeles, California); A&M Studios (Hollywood, California); Ground Control Studiis (Burbank, California); Can-Am Recorders (Tarzana, California); Fantasy Studios (Berkeley, California)
- Genre: Pop rock
- Length: 52:38
- Label: Elektra
- Producers: Desmond Child; Sir Arthur Payson

Professional ratings
Review scores
| Source | Rating |
|---|---|
| AllMusic | 4/5 stars |

Discipline is the only solo album recorded by American songwriter and producer Desmond Child. It was released on Elektra in 1991 and features his longer take on "Love on a Rooftop", a song he wrote for Ronnie Spector's album Unfinished Business in 1987, later included in Cher's studio album Heart of Stone. Child's version reached number 40 on the US Billboard Hot 100. Bon Jovi guitarist Richie Sambora appears on the album; he co-wrote two tracks ("Discipline" and "According to the Gospel of Love"). Also notable is an appearance by Bon Jovi's drummer, Tico Torres. Songwriter Burt Bacharach co-wrote the song "Obsession", which peaked at number 19 on the Billboard Adult Contemporary chart.

== Track listing ==
1. "The Price of Lovin' You" (Child) – 3:51
2. "Discipline" (Child, Richie Sambora) – 5:07
3. "I Don't Wanna Be Your Friend" (Diane Warren) – 4:59
4. "Love on a Rooftop" (Child, Warren) – 5:19
5. "You're the Story of My Life" (Child, Warren) – 4:59
6. "According to the Gospel of Love" (Child, Sambora) – 6:10
7. "Do Me Right" (Child) – 4:20
8. "Obsession" (featuring Maria Vidal) (Child, Burt Bacharach) – 5:47
9. "The Gift of Life" (Child) – 7:10
10. "A Ray of Hope" (Don Paul Yowell) – 4:56

== Personnel ==
=== Musicians ===
- Desmond Child – lead vocals, backing vocals, vocals (8)
- C.J. Vanston – keyboards (1, 3–5, 7–10), synthesizers (2), arrangements
- Michael Cava – acoustic piano (10)
- John McCurry – guitars (1, 3–5, 7)
- Butch Walker – guitars (1), guitar solo (1)
- Steve Lukather – guitars (2, 4, 5, 7), guitar solo (3)
- Richie Sambora – guitars (2, 6), guitar solo (2)
- Vivian Campbell – guitars (7), guitar solo (7)
- Michael Landau – guitars (9)
- Tony Levin – bass (2, 6)
- Abraham Laboriel – bass (9)
- Vinnie Colaiuta – drums (1, 3–5, 7–9)
- Tico Torres – drums (2, 6)
- Michael Fisher – percussion (1, 3, 5–7)
- Dan Higgins – horns (2, 6)
- Larry Williams – horns (2, 6)
- Gary Grant – horns (2, 6)
- Jerry Hey – horns (2, 6), horn arrangements (2, 6)
- Chris Mostert – saxophone (4)
- Brandon Fields – saxophone (5, 8)
- Michael Anthony – backing vocals
- Mark Free – backing vocals
- Jesse Harte – backing vocals
- Kathy Hazzard – backing vocals
- Mitch Malloy – backing vocals
- Louis Merlino – backing vocals
- Jean McClain – backing vocals, vocals (2, 9)
- Machun Notarlie – backing vocals
- Joan Jett – backing vocals (3)
- Kane Roberts – backing vocals (4)
- Diana Grasselli – backing vocals (4)
- Myriam Valle – backing vocals (4)
- Maria Vidal – backing vocals (4), vocals (8)

=== Production ===
- Desmond Child – producer
- Sir Arthur Payson – producer, recording
- Martin Brumbach – assistant engineer
- Robert Hart – assistant engineer
- Efren Herrera – assistant engineer
- John Jackson – assistant engineer
- Rick Ornstein – assistant engineer
- Matt Packuko – assistant engineer
- Frank Salazar – assistant engineer
- Brian Scheuble – assistant engineer
- Tom Size – assistant engineer
- Brian Malouf – mixing
- Pat MacDougall – mix assistant
- Bob Ludwig – mastering at Masterdisk (Nashville, Tennessee)
- Michael Anthony – production manager
- David Bither – creative director
- Michelle Piza – creative director
- Norman Moore – art direction, design
- Michel Comte – photography
- Chris Cuffaro – photography
