= The Lords of Tantrazz =

1996 video game

- Developer: dpi
- Publisher: Atlantean Interactive
- Release: 1996
- Genre: Adventure

The Lords of Tantrazz is a 1996 adventure video game published by Atlantean Interactive Games.

== Plot ==
The player is an agent named Veronika Callahan who is tasked with fighting against an unimaginable evil named "The Hunger".

== Gameplay ==
The game is played in first-person 360° view. The cutscenes take place in the form of comic strips.

== Development ==
The game includes the voice of former Alice Cooper guitarist Kane Roberts and well as Alice Cooper himself. Post-retirement from the music industry, Roberts began production on three computer games, one of which was The Lords of Tantrazz. In April 1996, a press release wrote that the title was set for the 3rd quarter of that year. When the game was released, Alice and Kane did promotional appearances for the game, though no word on Kane's other two projects was ever offered to the public.

== Reception ==
Reception

Review scores
Publication	Score
Next Generation	1/5
Gamezilla	39/100

A reviewer for Next Generation remarked that "The game is so static it comes across more like a CD-romic than an actual game, especially since you can count the number of puzzles on the fingers of one hand." He found the non-interactive elements of the game to be insultingly poor as well, particularly that the story has no ending, only a teaser for a sequel. Gamezilla recommended the game only to fans of Alice Cooper, though cautioned that Cooper doesn't really have an impact until the very end. CDMag described it as a B level game. Techtite thought the game had the core design of Myst, but with all the enjoyment stripped away. Four Fat Chicks felt that the game was an ego trip comparable to that of Queensryche's Promised Land.
