= The Essentials (Alice Cooper album) =

The Essentials: Alice Cooper

Greatest hits album by Alice Cooper
- Released: June 4, 2002
- Genre: Hard rock, heavy metal
- Length: 40:21
- Label: Rhino
- Producer: Alice Cooper

Alice Cooper chronology
Dragontown (2001)	The Essentials: Alice Cooper (2002)	Hell Is (2002)

Professional ratings
Review scores
Source	Rating
Allmusic	4/5 stars
The Rolling Stone Album Guide	2/5 stars

The Essentials: Alice Cooper is a compilation album featuring Alice Cooper, released in 2002 by Rhino Records as part of their The Essentials series.

== Track listing ==
No.	Title	Length
1.	"I'm Eighteen"	2:58
2.	"Under My Wheels"	2:47
3.	"Be My Lover"	3:21
4.	"School's Out"	3:29
5.	"Elected"	3:43
6.	"No More Mr. Nice Guy"	3:07
7.	"Billion Dollar Babies"	3:39
8.	"Only Women Bleed"	3:30
9.	"Welcome to My Nightmare"	2:47
10.	"I Never Cry"	3:43
11.	"You and Me"	3:25
12.	"How You Gonna See Me Now"	3:52
