= Feed My Frankenstein =

1992 single by Alice Cooper

- Single cover

Single by Alice Cooper

from the album Hey Stoopid
- B-side: "Burning Our Bed"
- Released: May 25, 1992
- Recorded: 1991
- Studio: Bearsville (Bearsville, New York)
- Genre: Glam metal
- Length: 4:44
- Label: Epic
- Songwriters: Mark Manning; Ian Richardson; Nick Coler; Alice Cooper
- Producer: Peter Collins

Alice Cooper singles chronology
"Love's a Loaded Gun" (1991)	"Feed My Frankenstein" (1992)	"Lost in America" (1994)

"Feed My Frankenstein" is a song originally written and originally released by British hard rock band Zodiac Mindwarp and the Love Reaction for their 1991 album Hoodlum Thunder. American singer Alice Cooper covered it on his 12th solo studio album, Hey Stoopid the same year, and released it as a single in May 1992. Its highest chart position as a single was number 27 on the UK Singles Chart. Cooper gained a co-writer credit for his version due to different lyrics from the original.

The song was featured in the 1992 film Wayne's World, in which Cooper performs the song at a concert, and was featured on the film's soundtrack.

Guest appearances on the track include Joe Satriani, Steve Vai, Nikki Sixx, and Elvira (Cassandra Peterson).

== Personnel ==
- Alice Cooper – vocals
- Mickey Curry – drums
- Robert Bailey – keyboards
- Joe Satriani – guitar
- Steve Vai – guitar
- Nikki Sixx – bass

== Charts ==
Weekly chart performance for "Feed My Frankenstein"
Chart (1992)	Peak position
Australia (ARIA)	169
UK Singles (OCC)	27
