= Hey Stoopid =

Studio album by Alice Cooper
- Released: July 2, 1991
- Recorded: January–February 1991
- Studios: Bearsville (New York), The Complex (Los Angeles)
- Genre: Pop metal
- Length: 56:05
- Label: Epic
- Producer: Peter Collins

Alice Cooper chronology
Prince of Darkness (1989)	Hey Stoopid (1991)	The Last Temptation (1994)

Singles from Hey Stoopid
- 1. "Hey Stoopid" Released: June 10, 1991; 2. "Love's a Loaded Gun" Released: September 23, 1991; 3. "Feed My Frankenstein" Released: May 25, 1992

Professional ratings
Review scores
Source	Rating
AllMusic	3/5 stars
The Rolling Stone Album Guide	2/5 stars

Hey Stoopid is the twelfth solo and nineteenth studio album overall by American rock singer Alice Cooper, released on July 2, 1991, by Epic Records. After his smash 1989 hit album Trash, Cooper attempted to continue his success with his follow-up album, which features guest performances from Lance Bulen, Slash, Ozzy Osbourne, Vinnie Moore, Joe Satriani, Steve Vai, Nikki Sixx and Mick Mars (both of Mötley Crüe). Hey Stoopid was Cooper's last album to feature bassist Hugh McDonald before he joined Bon Jovi in 1994.

According to Cooper assistant Brian Renfield, an alternate cover was originally considered, described by Renfield as being "hardcore with hypo needles, pills..." Notably, the track "Feed My Frankenstein" features famed guitar duo Steve Vai and Joe Satriani playing together, accompanied by Nikki Sixx on bass.

== Track listing ==
No.	Title	Writer(s)	Guest musicians	Length
1.	"Hey Stoopid"	Alice Cooper, Vic Pepe, Jack Ponti, Bob Pfeifer	Slash, Ozzy Osbourne, Joe Satriani	4:33
2.	"Love's a Loaded Gun"	Cooper, Pepe, Ponti		4:11
3.	"Snakebite"	Cooper, Pepe, Ponti, Pfeifer, Lance Bulen, Kelly Keeling		4:33
4.	"Burning Our Bed"	Cooper, Al Pitrelli, Pfeifer, Steve West	Joe Satriani	4:34
5.	"Dangerous Tonight"	Cooper, Desmond Child		4:41
6.	"Might as Well Be on Mars"	Cooper, Dick Wagner, Child		7:10
7.	"Feed My Frankenstein"	Cooper, Zodiac Mindwarp, Ian Richardson, Nick Coler	Joe Satriani, Steve Vai, Nikki Sixx, Elvira, Mistress of the Dark	4:44
8.	"Hurricane Years"	Cooper, Pepe, Ponti, Pfeifer	Vinnie Moore	3:58
9.	"Little by Little"	Cooper, Pepe, Ponti, Pfeifer	Joe Satriani	4:35
10.	"Die for You"	Cooper, Mick Mars, Nikki Sixx, Jim Vallance	Mick Mars	4:16
11.	"Dirty Dreams"	Cooper, Pfeifer, Vallance	Vinnie Moore	3:29
12.	"Wind-Up Toy"	Cooper, Pepe, Ponti, Pfeifer	Joe Satriani	5:27

Japanese release bonus track

No.	Title	Writer(s)	Length
13.	"It Rained All Night"	Cooper, Child	3:54

2013 remastered release bonus tracks

No.	Title	Writer(s)	Length
13.	"Hey Stoopid (Beba Edit)"	Cooper, Pepe, Ponti, Pfeifer	3:58
14.	"Fire"	Jimi Hendrix	3:04
15.	"It Rained All Night"	Cooper, Child	3:54

== Stoopid News ==
In 1991, alongside the release of the album, a promotional CD entitled Stoopid News (Epic ESK 4161) was released featuring 15 sound bites read by Alice Cooper, as follows:

1. "Rock N' Roll Bat Belts Hits"
2. "Voodoo Snake Cures Headaches?"
3. "She-Male Werewolf Captured Alive"
4. "Buying Goats to Watch 'Em Faint"
5. "Poop Lady Raking It In"
6. "Bar Serves Human Blood Cocktails"
7. "Russian Men Won't Act in Porn"
8. "Wild Man Raised by Cows"
9. "Outer Space Blobs Eating Our Planes"
10. "Man Paid $3000 for Being Stinky"
11. "Father Shoot at Son over Monopoly"
12. "Single Man Collects Dirty Diapers"
13. "Woman Beats Self Senseless with Own Hand"
14. "Man Tries To Sell Senseless with Own Hand"
15. "Hubbies Ghost Made Me Pregnant"

== Personnel ==
- Alice Cooper – lead vocals, harmonica
- Stef Burns – guitars
- Hugh McDonald – bass
- Lance Bulen – backing vocals
- Mickey Curry – drums, percussion

Additional personnel

- Slash – guitars (track 1)
- Joe Satriani – guitars (tracks 1, 4, 7, 9, 12), backing vocals (track 1)
- Steve Vai – guitars (track 7)
- Vinnie Moore – guitars (tracks 8, 11)
- Mick Mars – guitars (track 10)
- Nikki Sixx – bass (track 7)
- John Webster – keyboards (tracks 1–4, 7, 9, 10, 12), Hammond B3 Organ (track 5)
- Robert Bailey – keyboards (tracks 2, 5–8, 10, 12)
- Jai Winding – keyboards (track 6)
- Chris Boardman – string arrangement (track 6)
- Steve Croes – synclavier (tracks 1, 10)
- Ozzy Osbourne – backing vocals (track 1)
- Zachary Nevel – backing vocals (track 1)

== Charts ==
=== Weekly charts ===
Chart (1991)	Peak position
Australian Albums (ARIA)	15
Austrian Albums (Ö3 Austria)	5
Canada Top Albums/CDs (RPM)	23
Dutch Albums (Album Top 100)	54
Finnish Albums (Suomen virallinen lista)	3
German Albums (Offizielle Top 100)	7
Hungarian Albums (MAHASZ)	27
New Zealand Albums (RMNZ)	22
Norwegian Albums (VG-lista)	6
Swedish Albums (Sverigetopplistan)	9
Swiss Albums (Schweizer Hitparade)	7
UK Albums (Official Charts)	4
US Billboard 200	47

=== Year-end charts ===
Chart (1991)	Position
European Albums (Music & Media)	53
German Albums (Offizielle Top 100)	65
Swiss Albums (Schweizer Hitparade)	35

== Certifications ==
Region	Certification	Certified units/sales
Canada (Music Canada)	Platinum	100,000^{^}
Sweden (GLF)	Gold	50,000^{^}
United Kingdom (BPI)	Silver	60,000^{^}
^{^} Shipments figures based on certification alone.
