= Lost in America (Alice Cooper song) =

- Single cover

Single by Alice Cooper

from the album The Last Temptation
- B-side: "Hey Stoopid (Live)"
- Released: May 1994
- Recorded: 1994
- Genre: Hard rock, heavy metal
- Length: 3:54
- Label: Epic Records
- Songwriters: Alice Cooper, Dan Wexler, Bud Saylor
- Producer: Alice Cooper

Alice Cooper singles chronology
"Feed My Frankenstein" (1992)	"Lost in America" (1994)	"It's Me" (1994)

"Lost in America" is a single by musician Alice Cooper, who co-wrote the song with Bud Saylor and Icon guitarist Dan Wexler, taken from his 1994 album The Last Temptation. It was the most popular single from the album. “Lost in America” has been a live staple since its release, and is the solitary song from The Last Temptation that Cooper has performed live from 2000 onwards. The single featured a B-side, a live version of "Hey Stoopid".

== Music video ==
A music video was made for the song, but it received almost no airplay at all. The music video features a young boy (supposedly Steven) reading the Marvel Comics adaptation of the album, written by Neil Gaiman. The comic book comes to life as Alice Cooper and his band playing the song with several video clips referencing the song's lyrics.

== Personnel ==
- Alice Cooper - vocals
- Stef Burns - guitar, background vocals
- Greg Smith - bass, background vocals
- Derek Sherinian - keyboards, background vocals
- Ricky Parent - drums
- Dan Wexler - additional guitar

== Chart positions ==
Chart (1994)	Position
Australian Singles Chart	65
New Zealand Singles Chart	46
UK Singles Chart	22
