= Val-Du-Lakes Amphitheater =

Coordinates: 43.6708°N 86.4612°W

Val-Du-Lakes Amphitheater was an outdoor music venue located in the town of Mears, Michigan. Built in the 1980s, Val-Du hosted many summertime concerts for mainstream music acts consistently until the late 1990s.
