= Only My Heart Talkin' =

1990 single by Alice Cooper

- Single Cover

Single by Alice Cooper featuring Steven Tyler

from the album Trash
- B-side: "Only Women Bleed (Live)"
- Released: April 1990
- Recorded: 1989
- Genre: Glam metal
- Length: 4:47
- Label: Epic Records
- Songwriters: Alice Cooper, Bruce Roberts, Andy Goldmark, Apriadi-Velix
- Producer: Desmond Child

Alice Cooper singles chronology
"House of Fire" (1989)	"Only My Heart Talkin'" (1990)	"Hey Stoopid" (1991)

"Only My Heart Talkin'" is a power ballad by singer Alice Cooper taken from his 1989 album Trash. It is one of four singles taken from the album (the other three being "Poison", "House of Fire" and "Bed of Nails").

The song was written by Alice Cooper, Bruce Roberts and Andy Goldmark. It features Steven Tyler on guest vocals, although Tyler does not appear in the song's music video.

The song only peaked at #89 on the US charts, but the song had bigger success in Australia, achieving #47 at its peak, though it was the second least successful single from the album, behind House Of Fire, which peaked at no. 80.

== Charts ==
Chart (1990)	Peak position
Australia (ARIA)	47
US Billboard Hot 100	89
US Album Rock Tracks (Billboard)	19
US Cash Box Top 100	85
