= Trash (Alice Cooper album) =

Studio album by Alice Cooper
- Released: July 25, 1989
- Recorded: May–June 1989
- Studios: Bearsville, Woodstock; Power Station, New York City; Right Track, New York City; Sigma Sound, Philadelphia; Mediasound, New York City; Grog Kill; Village Recorder, Los Angeles; The Complex; Record Plant, New York City; Blue Jay; Sanctuary Sound
- Genre: Glam metal
- Length: 40:11
- Label: Epic
- Producer: Desmond Child

Alice Cooper chronology
Raise Your Fist and Yell (1987)	Trash (1989)	Prince of Darkness (1989)

Singles from Trash
- 1. "Poison" Released: July 17, 1989; 2. "Bed of Nails" Released: September 25, 1989; 3. "House of Fire" Released: November 1989; 4. "Trash" Released: 1989; 5. "I'm Your Gun" Released: 1989; 6. "Only My Heart Talkin'" Released: April 1990

Professional ratings
Review scores
Source	Rating
AllMusic	4/5 stars
The Rolling Stone Album Guide	2/5 stars

Trash is the eleventh solo and overall eighteenth studio album by American rock musician Alice Cooper. It was released on July 25, 1989, by Epic Records. The album features the single "Poison", Cooper's first top ten hit since his single "You and Me" in 1977 and marked a great success in Cooper's musical career, reaching the Top 20 of various album charts and selling more than 4.5 million copies. Trash features John McCurry (who has previously worked with Julian Lennon) on guitar, Hugh McDonald of Bon Jovi on bass as well as Bobby Chouinard and Alan St. Jon, both from Billy Squier's solo band on drums and keyboards, respectively. The album was the "biggest hit among his hair metal albums", peaking at number two in the UK and number 20 in the US.

== Overview ==
After his return to the music industry with the successful "The Nightmare Returns" tour, Cooper had sought assistance from Desmond Child to create a comeback album. Trash became one of Cooper's biggest albums, accompanied by music videos for "Poison", "Bed of Nails", "House of Fire", and "Only My Heart Talkin'". A successful year-long worldwide concert tour in support of the album was documented in the home video release Alice Cooper Trashes The World.

The album features many guest performances including Jon Bon Jovi; Stiv Bators; singer/guitarist Kane Roberts (who left Cooper's band in 1988); as well as four of the five members of Aerosmith, Cooper's 1970s contemporaries who were also making a successful comeback at the time (only Brad Whitford did not participate). Songwriting contributions were also made by Joan Jett, Diane Warren, Jon Bon Jovi, Richie Sambora, and John McCurry.

== Critical reception ==
The album has received mostly positive reviews. AllMusic reviewer Alex Henderson gave the album four stars out of five describing it as a "highly slick and commercial yet edgy pop-metal effort that temporarily restored him to the charts in a big way". Rolling Stone placed the album at 36 on their list of the "50 Greatest Hair Metal Albums of All Time". Kerrang! put the album in sixth place in on their ranking of every Alice Cooper album. MetalSucks included the album at No. 7 on their list of "The Ten Best Must-Have Glam Metal Albums".

== Track listing ==
No.	Title	Writer(s)	Length
1.	"Poison"	Alice Cooper · Desmond Child · John McCurry	4:29
2.	"Spark in the Dark"	Cooper · Child	3:52
3.	"House of Fire"	Cooper · Child · Joan Jett	3:47
4.	"Why Trust You"	Cooper · Child	3:12
5.	"Only My Heart Talkin'"	Cooper · Bruce Roberts · Andy Goldmark	4:47
6.	"Bed of Nails"	Cooper · Child · Kane Roberts · Diane Warren	4:20
7.	"This Maniac's in Love with You"	Cooper · Child · Bob Held · Tom Teeley	3:48
8.	"Trash"	Cooper · Child · Mark Frazier · Jamie Sever	4:01
9.	"Hell Is Living Without You"	Cooper · Child · Jon Bon Jovi · Richie Sambora	4:11
10.	"I'm Your Gun"	Cooper · Child · McCurry	3:47
Total length:			40:11

Additional tracks on the 2014 Japanese LTD Blu-spec CD II Remastered Re-issue
No.	Title	Writer(s)	Length
11.	"Only My Heart Talkin'" (Radio Edit)	Cooper · Roberts · Goldmark	3:57
12.	"I Got a Line on You"	Randy California	3:00

Additional tracks on the Japanese release
No.	Title	Writer(s)	Length
11.	"Cold Ethyl" (live)	Cooper · Bob Ezrin
12.	"Ballad of Dwight Fry" (live)	Michael Bruce · Cooper

== Personnel ==
Main musicians

- Alice Cooper – lead vocals
- John McCurry – guitar
- Hugh McDonald – bass, backing vocals
- Bobby Chouinard – drums
- Alan St. John – keyboards, backing vocals

Additional personnel

- Steven Tyler – vocals (track 5)
- Jon Bon Jovi – vocals (track 8)
- Kip Winger – vocals (track 10)
- Joe Perry – guitar (track 3)
- Richie Sambora – guitar (track 9)
- Steve Lukather – guitar (track 9)
- Kane Roberts – guitar (track 6)
- Guy Mann-Dude – guitar (tracks 2, 4, 7)
- Tom Hamilton – bass (track 8)
- Joey Kramer – drums (track 8)
- Stiv Bators – backing vocals
- Mark Frazier – guitar (track 8)
- Jack Johnson – guitar (track 8)
- Paul Chiten – keyboards
- Steve Deutsch – synth programming
- Gregg Mangiafico – keyboards & special effects

== Production ==
- Produced by Desmond Child
- Recorded by Sir Arthur Payson, Obie O'Brien and Nick DiDia (both at Sanctuary Studios), George Cowan (at Bearsville), Mark Tanzer (at Blue Jay), Lolly Grodner (at Mediasound), Ben Fowler (at Power Station), John Herman (at Right Track), Brian Peterofsky (at Sigma Sound).
- Assistant Engineers: Duane Seykora (at The Complex) and Robert Hart (Village Recorders).
- Mixed by Steve Thompson and Michael Barbiero.
- Mastered by George Marino.

== Charts ==
=== Weekly charts ===
Weekly chart performance for Trash by Alice Cooper
Chart (1989–1990)	Peak position
Australian Albums (ARIA)	5
Austrian Albums (Ö3 Austria)	4
Canada Top Albums/CDs (RPM)	19
Dutch Albums (Album Top 100)	53
Finnish Albums (Suomen virallinen lista)	1
German Albums (Offizielle Top 100)	16
Hungarian Albums (MAHASZ)	13
New Zealand Albums (RMNZ)	6
Norwegian Albums (VG-lista)	4
Swedish Albums (Sverigetopplistan)	6
Swiss Albums (Schweizer Hitparade)	10
UK Albums (Official Charts)	2
US Billboard 200	20

=== Year-end charts ===
1989 year-end chart performance for Trash by Alice Cooper
Chart (1989)	Position
Australian Albums (ARIA)	48
European Albums (Music & Media)	67
German Albums (Offizielle Top 100)	90

1990 year-end chart performance for Trash by Alice Cooper
Chart (1990)	Position
Canadian Albums (RPM)	90
European Albums (Music & Media)	99
German Albums (Offizielle Top 100)	51
US Billboard 200	68

== Certifications ==
Certifications for Trash by Alice Cooper
Region	Certification	Certified units/sales
Australia (ARIA)	Platinum	70,000^{^}
Austria (IFPI Austria)	Gold	25,000^{*}
Canada (Music Canada)	Platinum	100,000^{^}
Finland (Musiikkituottajat)	Gold	50,912
Germany (BVMI)	Gold	250,000^{^}
New Zealand (RMNZ)	Platinum	15,000^{^}
Sweden (GLF)	Gold	50,000^{^}
Switzerland (IFPI Switzerland)	Gold	25,000^{^}
United States (RIAA)	Platinum	1,000,000^{^}
^{*} Sales figures based on certification alone.^{^} Shipments figures based on certification alone.
