= Kid Chaos =

- Also known as: Kid Haggis, Haggis
- Born: Stephen Harris; 1966 (age 59–60); Swansea, Wales
- Genres: Hard rock
- Instruments: Bass; guitar
- Years active: 1979–present

Kid Chaos, also known as Haggis (born Stephen Harris) is a British rock bassist and guitarist who played in incarnations of hard rock bands Zodiac Mindwarp and the Love Reaction, The Cult and The Four Horsemen as well as guesting with Appetite for Destruction era Guns N' Roses.

== History ==
Harris was born in 1966, in Swansea, Wales. He joined his first group, The Autonomes, at age 13. At 16, he failed most of his O-levels and left school. Harris enrolled in the Youth Enterprise Scheme, setting up a record label called Fierce Recordings with a friend.

Various record label dealings brought him to the attention of the just-forming Zodiac Mindwarp and the Love Reaction and he joined the band as their bass guitarist in October 1985, appearing on their mini album High Priest of Love. After this release he left the Love Reaction and joined The Cult as their bassist for their tour supporting the Electric album. Cult bassist Jamie Stewart had switched to rhythm guitar for the duration of the tour. Kid Chaos was credited in the tour booklet as "special guest" and was billed as "The Kid". In addition to playing live with The Cult on their tour, he can also be seen in the video for the "Wild Flower" single.

After the Electric tour finished, Kid Chaos moved to New York City and then Hollywood, quickly putting together a new band, The Four Horsemen, who were a more blues and boogie-inspired group than the hard rock/metal of ZMATLR and The Cult. Now known as Haggis, he switched to guitar and wrote most of the material. The Four Horsemen released a four track self-titled EP in 1989 before releasing the first full-length album Nobody Said It Was Easy in 1991 on Rick Rubin's Def American label. Business issues and internal fighting led to Harris walking away from the band.

Now residing in New York City, he released a solo album after a long absence under his real name of Stephen Harris. The album, Songs from the Mission of Hope, was released in 2003. The music was more singer-songwriter than his previous output, with Harris playing most of the instruments. The lyrics were personal, making the album a sort of autobiography.

In his thirties, Harris decided to go back to school, and after initially struggling with his studies he learned he has a lifelong learning difficulty. By 2006 he was able to overcome this enough to enroll in Columbia University as a pre-med student.

Harris graduated from Columbia University, summa cum laude and Phi Beta Kappa, in 2008, after which he attended the Mount Sinai School of Medicine in New York.

In 2013, his first band, The Autonomes, reformed briefly while he was visiting Swansea for a one-off gig, and recorded an album. He also helped form Punkhouse Records, a record label dedicated to releasing material from Swansea punk bands in the late 1970s and early 1980s, on which the Autonomes album was released.
