= Love's a Loaded Gun =

Single by Alice Cooper

from the album Hey Stoopid
- B-side: "Fire"
- Released: September 23, 1991
- Recorded: 1991
- Studio: Bearsville Studios, Bearsville, New York
- Genre: Glam metal
- Length: 4:11
- Label: Epic Records
- Songwriters: Alice Cooper, Vic Pepe, Jack Ponti
- Producer: Peter Collins

Alice Cooper singles chronology
"Hey Stoopid" (1991)	"Love's a Loaded Gun" (1991)	"Feed My Frankenstein" (1992)

"Love's a Loaded Gun" is a song by American rock singer Alice Cooper, taken from the 1991 album Hey Stoopid. The single managed to peak at No. 38 on the UK Singles Chart and No. 31 on the US Billboard Mainstream Rock Tracks chart. It was one of three singles released from the album (the other two being "Hey Stoopid" and "Feed My Frankenstein") that launched "Hey Stoopid" into the top 40.

The single featured a B-Side, a cover of Jimi Hendrix's "Fire".

== Personnel ==
- Alice Cooper – vocals, harmonica
- Mickey Curry – drums
- Stef Burns – guitar
- Hugh McDonald – bass
- John Webster – keyboards
- Robert Bailey – keyboards

== Charts ==
Chart (1991)	Peak position
Australia (ARIA)	125
UK Singles (OCC)	38
UK Airplay (Music Week)	52
US Mainstream Rock Tracks (Billboard)	31
