= Bed of Nails (song) =

1989 single by Alice Cooper

Single by Alice Cooper

from the album Trash
- B-side: "I'm Your Gun"
- Released: September 25, 1989
- Genre: Hard rock; glam metal; heavy metal
- Length: 4:20
- Label: Epic Records
- Songwriters: Alice Cooper, Desmond Child, Diane Warren
- Producer: Desmond Child

Alice Cooper singles chronology
"Poison" (1989)	"Bed of Nails" (1989)	"House of Fire" (1989)

"Bed of Nails" is a 1989 single by American rock singer Alice Cooper featuring singer and guitarist Kane Roberts, taken from his eleventh solo studio album, Trash. It is the second highest-charting single from the album (the first being "Poison"), achieving No. 38 in the UK, although the single was not released in the US. The other three singles taken from Trash are "Poison", "House of Fire" and "Only My Heart Talkin'". "Bed of Nails" was written by Cooper, Desmond Child, Roberts and Diane Warren.

== Charts ==
Chart (1989)	Peak position
Australian Singles Chart	13
UK Singles Chart	38
