= House of Fire =

1989 single by Alice Cooper

- Single Cover

Single by Alice Cooper featuring Joe Perry

from the album Trash
- B-side: "Poison (Live)"
- Released: November 1989
- Genre: Glam metal
- Length: 3:47
- Label: Epic
- Songwriters: Alice Cooper; Desmond Child; Joan Jett
- Producer: Desmond Child

Alice Cooper singles chronology
"Bed of Nails" (1989)	"House of Fire" (1989)	"Only My Heart Talkin'" (1990)

"House of Fire" is a 1989 single by American rock singer Alice Cooper from his 1989 album Trash. It was co-written by rock guitarist and vocalist Joan Jett alongside songwriter Desmond Child, the latter of which who had previously composed for performers such as Billy Squier, Bonnie Tyler, and Ronnie Spector.

The single initially came out in late 1989 within the United Kingdom, where it peaked at #65. "House of Fire" was released in the U.S. in early 1990 and reached #56 on the Billboard Hot 100 as well as #39 on the Mainstream Rock Tracks chart.

A demo version of "House of Fire" was recorded by Bon Jovi. It surfaced in 2014 as part of the band's alternate Deluxe Edition version of New Jersey.

== Charts ==
Chart (1989–1990)	Peak position
Australia (ARIA)	80
UK Singles (OCC)	65
US Billboard Hot 100	56
US Album Rock Tracks (Billboard)	39
US Cash Box Top 100	50
