= It's Me (Alice Cooper song) =

1994 single by Alice Cooper

Single by Alice Cooper

from the album The Last Temptation
- B-side: "Bad Place Alone"
- Released: July 11, 1994
- Length: 4:39
- Label: Epic
- Songwriters: Alice Cooper, Jack Blades, Tommy Shaw
- Producer: Alice Cooper

Alice Cooper singles chronology
"Lost in America" (1994)	"It's Me" (1994)	"School's Out (Live)" (1997)

"It's Me" is a song by American rock singer Alice Cooper from his 1994 concept album The Last Temptation. The song was written by Alice Cooper, Jack Blades and Tommy Shaw. The song reached number 34 in the United Kingdom and was the last time one of Cooper's singles charted there until 2000's "Gimme". "It's Me" was performed live on the first four Cooper shows on the Monsters of Rock circuit between September 2 and 9 of 1995, but was dropped and has never been performed live since.

== Music video ==
A music video was made for the song but received virtually no airplay.

== Personnel ==
- Alice Cooper – vocals
- Stef Burns – guitar, background vocals
- Greg Smith – bass, background vocals
- Derek Sherinian – keyboards, background vocals
- David Uosikkinen – drums
- John Purdell – additional keyboards

== Charts ==
Chart (1994)	Peak position
Australia (ARIA)	77
Iceland (Íslenski Listinn Topp 40)	25
UK Singles (OCC)	34
