= Hey Stoopid (song) =

1991 single by Alice Cooper

- Single cover

Single by Alice Cooper

from the album Hey Stoopid
- B-side: "It Rained All Night"
- Released: June 10, 1991
- Genre: Glam metal
- Length: 4:34
- Label: Epic
- Songwriters: Alice Cooper, Vic Pepe, Jack Ponti, Bob Pfeifer
- Producer: Peter Collins

Alice Cooper singles chronology
"Only My Heart Talkin'" (1990)	"Hey Stoopid" (1991)	"Love's a Loaded Gun" (1991)

"Hey Stoopid" is a song by American rock singer Alice Cooper and the title track from his 12th solo studio album, Hey Stoopid (1991). The song reached number 78 on the United States Billboard Hot 100, number 21 on the UK Singles Chart, number seven in Finland, and number five in Norway. Slash, Ozzy Osbourne, and Joe Satriani make guest appearances on the song.

== Personnel ==
- Alice Cooper – vocals, harmonica
- Mickey Curry – drums, percussion
- Hugh McDonald – bass
- Stef Burns – guitar
- Joe Satriani – guitar, backing vocals
- Slash – guitar
- Steve Croes – synclavier
- Ozzy Osbourne – backing vocals
- Zachary Nevel – backing vocals

== Charts ==
Chart (1991)	Peak position
Australia (ARIA)	32
Belgium (Ultratop 50 Flanders)	36
Canada Top Singles (RPM)	48
Europe (Eurochart Hot 100)	29
Finland (Suomen virallinen lista)	7
Luxembourg (Radio Luxembourg)	14
Netherlands (Dutch Top 40)	13
Netherlands (Single Top 100)	22
New Zealand (Recorded Music NZ)	17
Norway (VG-lista)	5
Sweden (Sverigetopplistan)	19
UK Singles (Official Charts)	21
UK Airplay (Music Week)	31
US Billboard Hot 100	78
US Mainstream Rock Airplay (Billboard)	13
US Cash Box Top 100	81

== Release history ==
Region	Date	Format(s)	Label(s)	Ref.
United Kingdom	June 10, 1991	7-inch vinyl; 12-inch vinyl	Epic	
Australia	July 8, 1991	CD; cassette	Epic	
Japan	July 25, 1991	Mini-CD	Epic	
