= Zodiac Mindwarp and the Love Reaction =

British hard rock group

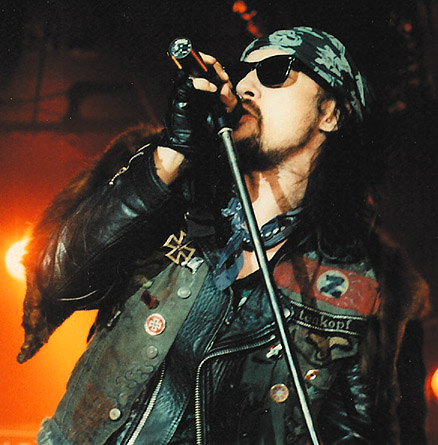
- Zodiac Mindwarp on stage at L'Amour in Brooklyn, New York City, c. 1989

Background information
- Genre: Hard rock
- Years active: 1985–2022 (hiatus)
- Members: Zodiac Mindwarp; Cobalt Stargazer; Jack Shitt; Bruno 'The Cat' Agua
- Past members: Jimmy Cauty; Kid Chaos; Boom Boom Kaboomski; Jake Le Mesurier; Slam Thunderhide; Evil Bastard; Trash D Garbage; Flash Bastard; Suzi X Tex Diablo; Robbie Vom; Kev Reverb; The Apocalypse

Zodiac Mindwarp and the Love Reaction were a British hard rock group. Formed in 1985, they played a sleazy style of commercial hard rock featuring big riffs and choruses, fashionable in the band's heyday of the mid-to-late 1980s and early 1990s.

== Overview ==
The band was the brainchild of Mark Manning, a former graphic artist and art editor of the now-defunct Flexipop! magazine. The magazine folded in 1982, but the hedonistic lifestyle of the rock and pop stars who frequented the magazine's offices fuelled his desire to experience the debauchery of life as a decadent rock star. He joined another music publication called Metal Fury as a graphic designer, but assumed the alter ego 'Zodiac Mindwarp' at night. 'Zodiac Mindwarp' was the namesake of a series of underground comics written and illustrated by Spain Rodriguez. Zodiac soon left Metal Fury and formed the Love Reaction in 1985 with Jimmy Cauty (who later formed the Orb, the Justified Ancients of Mu Mu and the KLF) on guitar; Kid Chaos (Stephen Harris) on bass; and Boom Boom Kaboomski on drums.

The band were signed to the Food label of Phonogram Records, who soon issued their first recording, "Wild Child", with just Zodiac playing guitar and on vocals, Kid Chaos on bass and Jake Le Mesurier on drums. A demo version of "High Priest of Love" was included on the Melody Maker Vinyl Conflict 2 free EP in September 1986. By the end of the year the line-up had changed again to accommodate the still-present figure of Cobalt Stargazer (Geoff Bird) and new drummer Slam Thunderhide (Stephen Landrum). That line-up contributed the studio track "Drug Shoes" to the FOOD Imminent 2 compilation.

At various times, the band have also featured Evil Bastard (Robert Munro, who co-penned and sang on two B-sides: "Hangover from Hell" and "Lager Woman from Hell"), Heavy Metal Bear (Alex Bradly), Trash D Garbage (Paul Bailey), Flash Bastard (Jan Cyrka), Suzi X (Richard Levy), Tex Diablo (Christopher Renshaw), and Robbie Vom (Rob Morris).

Zodiac Mindwarp progressed rapidly from their first gig at Dingwalls in November 1985 to playing in front of a packed Reading Festival in 1986, but this was followed by the departure of Kid Chaos, who joined the Cult. Zodiac regrouped by assigning Trash D Garbage on bass and Flash Bastard (Jan Cyrka) on rhythm guitar. The expanded five-member outfit went on to record their debut album in 1988, Tattooed Beat Messiah. Other band members playing bass included: Suzi X, Tex Diablo and Kev Reverb; previous drummers included Robbie Vom and The Apocalypse.

The act produced a UK Singles Chart Top 20 hit with their breakthrough record, "Prime Mover".

Half of the band's 1989 follow-on tour for the album was cancelled after Manning was run over outside The Leadmill venue in Sheffield.

Manning established himself as an author, penning A Bible of Dreams (1994) and Bad Wisdom (1996; both with Bill Drummond); plus Crucify Me Again (2000), Get Your Cock Out (2000), Fucked by Rock (2001), Collateral Damage, and The Wild Highway (2005; again with Drummond). Manning is also a regular contributor to The Idler magazine.

The band's name was taken from the Bruce Springsteen song "Dancing in the Dark", from the lyrics:
"I'm sick of sitting around here trying to write this book
I need a love reaction
Come on now, baby, give me just one look."

== Discography ==
=== Singles and EPs ===
	Year	Title	UK Indie Chart Position	UK Singles Chart Position
May	1986	"Wild Child" EP	9	–
August	1986	"High Priest of Love" EP	1	–
May	1987	"Prime Mover"		18
November	1987	"Back Seat Education"		–
April	1988	"Planet Girl"		63
	1993	"My Life Story" EP		–

=== Albums ===
- High Priest of Love (1986)
- Tattooed Beat Messiah (1988) – UK No. 20 (re-released in 1997 as The Best of Zodiac Mindwarp and the Love Reaction)
- Hoodlum Thunder (1991)
- Live at Reading (1993)
- One More Knife (1994)
- I Am Rock (2002) – (re-released in 2005 with four demo bonus tracks)
- Weapons of Mass Destruction (live album) (2004)
- Rock Savage (2005)
- Pandora's Grisly Handbag (1986 live album and DVD) (2006)
- We Are Volsung (2010)
- Carnival Of Souls (2026) recorded as Zodiac Youth with Youth Martin
